= List of awards and nominations received by Peter Gabriel =

The following list includes some of the most significant awards and nominations received by pop musician Peter Gabriel as a solo artist.

== Grammy Awards ==
Year Awarded	Nominee/work	Category	Result	Ref.
1983	"Shock the Monkey"	Best Rock Vocal Performance, Male	Nominated	
1985	Against All Odds Soundtrack	Best Album of Original Score Written for a Motion Picture or a Television Special	Nominated	
1987	So	Album of the Year (shared with Daniel Lanois)	Nominated	
1987	"Sledgehammer"	Record of the Year (shared with Daniel Lanois)	Nominated	
1987	"Sledgehammer"	Song of the Year	Nominated	
1987	"Sledgehammer"	Best Rock Vocal Performance, Male	Nominated	
1990	Passion	Best Album of Original Score Written for a Motion Picture or a Television Special	Nominated	
1990	Passion	Best New Age Performance	Won	
1992	P.O.V.	Best Music Video, Long Form	Nominated	
1993	Us	Best Pop Vocal Performance, Male	Nominated	
1993	"Digging in the Dirt"	Best Rock Song	Nominated	
1993	"Digging in the Dirt"	Best Rock Vocal Performance, Male	Nominated	
1993	"Digging in the Dirt"	Best Music Video, Short Form	Won	
1994	"Steam"	Best Rock Vocal Performance, Male	Nominated	
1994	"Steam"	Best Music Video, Short Form	Won	
1995	"Red Rain (live)"	Best Rock Vocal Performance, Male	Nominated	
1996	Secret World Live	Best Music Video, Long Form	Won	
2003	"The Barry Williams Show"	Best Rock Vocal Performance, Male	Nominated	
2009	"Down to Earth" (from WALL-E)	Best Song Written Specifically for a Motion Picture or Television (shared with Thomas Newman)	Won	
2009	"Define Dancing" (performed by Thomas Newman)	Best Instrumental Arrangement (shared with Thomas Newman)	Won	
2017	"The Veil" (from Snowden)	Best Song Written Specifically for a Motion Picture or Television	Nominated	
2025	"i/o"	Best Engineered Album, Non-Classical	Won	
2025	"i/o" (In-Side Mix)	Best Immersive Audio Album	Won	

== American Music Awards ==
Year Awarded	Nominee/work	Category	Result	Ref.
1987	Himself	Favorite Pop/Rock Male Artist	Nominated	
1987	Himself	Favorite Male Pop/Rock Video Artist	Nominated	
1988	"Sledgehammer"	Favorite Pop/Rock Video	Nominated	

== BT Digital Music Awards ==
Year	Nominee / work	Award	Result	Ref.
2006	Himself	Pioneer Award	Won	

== BMI London Awards ==
Year	Nominee / work	Award	Result	Ref.
2001	"In Your Eyes"	2 Million Award	Won	
2006	"In Your Eyes"	3 Million Award	Won	
2007	Himself	Icon Award	Won	
2012	"Sledgehammer"	3 Million Award	Won	
2020	"Sledgehammer"	4 Million Award	Won	
2020	"In Your Eyes"	6 Million Award	Won	

== Billboard Music Awards ==
Year	Nominee / work	Award	Result	Ref.
1986	Himself	Top Artist	Nominated	
1986	Himself	Top Billboard 200 Artist	Nominated	
1986	Himself	Top Billboard 200 Artist - Male	Nominated	
1986	Himself	Top Hot 100 Artist	Nominated	
1986	Himself	Top Hot 100 Artist - Male	Nominated	
1986	So	Top Billboard 200 Album	Nominated	
1986	So	Top Compact Disk	Nominated	
1986	"Sledgehammer"	Top Hot 100 Song	Nominated	
1986	"Sledgehammer"	Top Dance Club Play Single	Nominated	
1986	"Sledgehammer"	Top Dance Sales Single	Nominated	
1986	"Sledgehammer"	Top Rock Song	Nominated	
1986	"In Your Eyes"	Top Rock Song	Nominated	
1987	Himself	Top Artist	Nominated	
1987	Himself	Top Billboard 200 Artist - Male	Nominated	
1987	Himself	Top Hot 100 Artist - Male	Nominated	
1987	Himself	Top Hot 100 Artist	Nominated	
1987	So	Top Billboard 200 Album	Nominated	
1987	So	Top Compact Disk	Nominated	
1987	"Big Time"	Top Hot 100 Song	Nominated	

== Brit Awards ==
Year Awarded	Nominee/work	Category	Result	Ref.
1987	So	British Album	Nominated	
1987	"Sledgehammer"	British Single	Nominated	
1987	"Sledgehammer"	British Video	Won	
1987	Himself	British Male Artist	Won	
1990	Himself	British Producer	Nominated	
1993	Himself	British Producer	Won	
1993	"Digging in the Dirt"	British Video	Nominated	
1994	"Steam"	British Video	Nominated	

== CASBY Awards ==
Year	Nominee / work	Award	Result	Ref.
1986	So	International Album of the Year	Won	

== Classic Rock Roll of Honour Awards ==
Year	Nominee / work	Award	Result	Ref.
2012	So (25th Anniversary Immersion Box Set)	Best Box Set	Nominated	
2016	Growing Up Live + Still Growing Up Live & Unwrapped	Best Archival Live Album or Video	Nominated	
2016	Rock Paper Scissors Tour	Tour of the Year	Nominated	

== Danish Music Awards ==
Year	Nominee / work	Award	Result	Ref.
1993	So	Best International Album	Nominated	

== Denmark GAFFA Awards ==
Year	Nominee/work	Category	Result	Ref.
1992	Himself	Best Foreign Solo Act	Nominated	
1992	Us	Best Foreign Album	Nominated	
1992	"Digging in the Dirt"	Music Video of the Year	Won	

== IM&MC Music Video Awards ==
Year	Nominee / work	Award	Result	Ref.
1986	"Sledgehammer"	Best Effects	Won	

== Ivor Novello Awards ==
Year Awarded	Nominee/work	Category	Result	Ref.
1987	"Don't Give Up"	Best Song Musically and Lyrically	Won	
1987	"Sledgehammer"	Best Contemporary Song	Nominated	
2003	Long Walk Home: Music from the Rabbit-Proof Fence	Best Original Film Score	Nominated	
2007	Himself	Lifetime Achievement Award	Won	
2022	Himself	Academy Fellowship	Won	

== MTV Video Music Awards ==
Year Awarded	Nominee/work	Category	Result	Ref.
1987	Himself	Michael Jackson Video Vanguard Award	Won	
1987	"Sledgehammer"	Video of the Year	Won	
1987	"Sledgehammer"	Best Male Video	Won	
1987	"Sledgehammer"	Best Concept Video	Won	
1987	"Sledgehammer"	Most Experimental Video	Won	
1987	"Sledgehammer"	Best Overall Performance in a Video	Won	
1987	"Sledgehammer"	Best Direction in a Video (for Stephen R. Johnson)	Won	
1987	"Sledgehammer"	Best Special Effects in a Video (for Peter Lord)	Won	
1987	"Sledgehammer"	Best Art Direction in a Video (for Stephen Quay & Timothy Quay)	Won	
1987	"Sledgehammer"	Best Editing in a Video (for Colin Green)	Won	
1987	"Sledgehammer"	Viewer's Choice	Nominated	
1987	"Big Time"	Best Concept Video	Nominated	
1987	"Big Time"	Best Special Effects in a Video (for Peter Wallach)	Nominated	
1988	"Biko" (from Cry Freedom)	Best Video from a Film	Nominated	
1991	P.O.V.	Best Long Form Video	Nominated	
1993	"Digging in the Dirt"	Video of the Year	Nominated	
1993	"Digging in the Dirt"	Viewer's Choice	Nominated	
1993	"Digging in the Dirt"	International Viewer's Choice (Europe)	Nominated	
1993	"Steam"	Best Male Video	Nominated	
1993	"Steam"	Best Editing in a Video (for Douglas Jines)	Won	
1993	"Steam"	Best Special Effects in a Video (for Real World Productions & Colossal Pictures)	Won	
1994	"Kiss That Frog"	Best Editing in a Video (for Craig Wood)	Nominated	
1994	"Kiss That Frog"	Best Special Effects in a Video (for Brett Leonard & Angel Studios)	Won	

== Academy Awards ==
Year Awarded	Nominee/work	Category	Result	Ref.
2009	"Down to Earth" (from WALL-E)	Best Original Song (shared with Thomas Newman)	Nominated	

== Golden Globe Awards ==
Year Awarded	Nominee/work	Category	Result	Ref.
1989	The Last Temptation of Christ	Best Original Score	Nominated	
2003	Rabbit-Proof Fence	Best Original Score	Nominated	
2009	"Down to Earth" (from WALL-E)	Best Original Song (shared with Thomas Newman)	Nominated	

== Q Awards ==
Year Awarded	Nominee/work	Category	Result	Ref.
1992	Himself	Best Producer (shared with Daniel Lanois & The Orb)	Won	
2006	Himself	Q Lifetime Achievement Award	Won	

== Pollstar Concert Industry Awards ==
Year	Nominee / work	Award	Result
1987	Himself	Comeback of the Year	Nominated
1988	Tour	Most Creative Stage Production	Nominated
1994	Secret World Tour	Most Creative Stage Production	Won
1994	Secret World Tour	Major Tour of the Year	Nominated
1995	Secret World Tour	Most Creative Stage Production	Nominated

== Top of the Pops Awards ==
Year	Nominee / work	Award	Result	Ref.
2003	Himself	Singer of the Year	Nominated	

== British Academy of Songwriters, Composers, and Authors ==
Year Awarded	Nominee/work	Category	Result	Ref.
2015	Himself	Gold Badge Award	Won	

== Žebřík Music Awards ==
Year	Nominee / work	Award	Result	Ref.
2005	Himself	Best International Male	Nominated	
