= Secret World Live (film) =

Video by Peter Gabriel
- Released: 30 August 1994
- Recorded: 16–17 November 1993
- Venues: Palasport Nuovo, Modena, Italy
- Genre: Rock
- Length: 132 mins.
- Labels: Geffen (US & Canada), Virgin

Peter Gabriel chronology
Peter Gabriel Revisited (1992)	Secret World Live (1994)	Growing Up: Live (2003)

Secret World Live is a film assembled from two Peter Gabriel concerts in 1993, as part of his Secret World Tour to support his sixth solo album, Us. The show is performed across two stages: a square and a circular stage, bridged by a conveyor belt. It was released on VHS, LaserDisc and DVD. An album of the same title with a similar track listing was also released.

The film received the 1996 Grammy Award for Best Long Form Music Video, honouring video director Francois Girard and video producer Robert Warr.

On 11 March 2003 Secret World Live was digitally remastered in stereo, 5.1 surround sound and DTS on DVD. This version also featured bonus content such as the track "Quiet Steam", interviews, and a photo gallery. It was remastered again on DVD and Blu-ray on 2 July 2012 in the UK and 24 July 2012 in North America. The new release also contains the song "Red Rain", which was not present on the original releases.

== Track listing ==
1. "Come Talk to Me" – 6:39
2. "Steam" – 7:53
3. "Across the River" – 5:57
4. "Slow Marimbas" – 1:45
5. "Shaking the Tree" – 7:12
6. "Blood of Eden" – 7:02
7. "San Jacinto" – 7:34
8. "Kiss That Frog" – 6:21
9. "Washing of the Water" – 3:55
10. "Solsbury Hill" – 4:27
11. "Digging in the Dirt" – 6:55
12. "Sledgehammer" – 6:05
13. "Secret World" – 10:16
14. "Don't Give Up" – 7:34
15. "In Your Eyes" – 12:48

Bonus tracks

1. "Red Rain"
2. "Quiet Steam"
3. "The Rhythm of the Heat"

== Personnel ==
- Peter Gabriel — lead vocals, keyboards, harmonica ("Kiss That Frog"), rainstick ("Slow Marimbas")
- Tony Levin – bass, Chapman stick, synthesizer, backing vocals
- David Rhodes – guitar, backing vocals
- Manu Katche – drums, backing vocals
- Jean-Claude Naimro – keyboards, backing vocals
- L. Shankar – violin, backing vocals
- Levon Minassian – doudouk
- Paula Cole – backing vocals, duet vocals
- Job "Ayub Ogada" Seda – backing vocals
- Papa Wemba – guest vocals ("In Your Eyes")
- Reddy Mela Amissi – backing vocals
- Styno Mubi Matadi – backing vocals

== Charts ==
=== Weekly charts ===
Chart performance for Secret World Live
Chart (1994–2014)	Peak position
Australian Music DVD (ARIA)	40
Austrian Music DVD (Ö3 Austria)	5
Dutch Music DVD (MegaCharts)	7
French Music DVD (SNEP)	3
Italian Music DVD (FIMI)	2
New Zealand Music DVD (RMNZ)	1
Portuguese Music DVD (AFP)	9
Swedish Music DVD (Sverigetopplistan)	6
Swiss Music DVD (Schweizer Hitparade)	8
UK Music Videos (OCC)	3

== Certifications ==
Certifications for Secret World Live
Region	Certification	Certified units/sales
Argentina (CAPIF)	Platinum	8,000^{^}
Australia (ARIA)	Gold	7,500^{^}
Canada (Music Canada) DVD	3× Platinum	30,000^{^}
Canada (Music Canada) VHS	Gold	5,000^{^}
France (SNEP)	Gold	10,000^{*}
Germany (BVMI)	3× Gold	75,000^{^}
New Zealand (RMNZ)	2× Platinum	10,000^{^}
Poland (ZPAV)	Gold	5,000^{*}
United Kingdom (BPI)	Gold	25,000^{^}
United States (RIAA)	Platinum	100,000^{^}
^{*} Sales figures based on certification alone.^{^} Shipments figures based on certification alone.
