= Secret World Tour =

1993–94 concert tour by Peter Gabriel

- Tour by Peter Gabriel
- Peter Gabriel in duet with Paula Cole
- Associated album: Us
- Start date: 13 April 1993
- End date: 14 August 1994
- Legs: 5 (3 Secret World, 2 WOMAD)
- No. of shows: 162

Peter Gabriel concert chronology
- This Way Up Tour (1986–87); Secret World Tour (1993–94); Growing Up Tour (2002–03)

The Secret World Tour was a concert tour mounted by the English singer-songwriter Peter Gabriel to promote his 1992 album Us. The stage show was designed by the French-Canadian director Robert Lepage, expressing the themes of tension and union between male and female forces, as represented by two stages linked by moving walkway. Three tour legs with elaborate staging were interspersed with two legs of much simpler WOMAD festival dates. Many of the same songs were performed by Gabriel, and he felt that all of his large-scale performances during these two years were part of the same tour. Secret World was Gabriel's first major solo outing since his tour of 1986–87 to support the album So. Afterward, he waited for almost a decade before embarking on the next tour, Growing Up, in 2002.

Musically, Gabriel used his most recent songs as well as a few earlier compositions for the set list of Secret World, taking songs primarily from Us, but also from So and other works. A handful of songs called for female vocals, especially "Blood of Eden" with its theme of sexual union. For these roles, Gabriel began the tour with British musician Joy Askew as second keyboardist and vocal duet partner, then he brought Irish singer-songwriter Sinéad O'Connor onto the tour as guest vocalist, covering Askew's keyboard parts with Jean-Claude Naimro of Kassav'. O'Connor left suddenly in October, and American singer-songwriter Paula Cole was quickly recruited to fill her position, earning high praise for her performance. The core of Gabriel's touring band was composed of long-time collaborators: bassist Tony Levin, guitarist David Rhodes, drummer Manu Katché and violinist L. Shankar. This was the first time that Gabriel used in-ear monitors on tour.

A few days after Cole joined the tour, the show was filmed and recorded in Modena, Italy, to produce the concert video Secret World Live. The video was honoured at the 38th Annual Grammy Awards, winning in the category Best Music Video, Long Form. An associated live album was released with the same name—Secret World Live—it rose to number 10 on the United Kingdom charts, was certified 2× Platinum in Italy, and was certified Gold in the United States.

== Staging ==
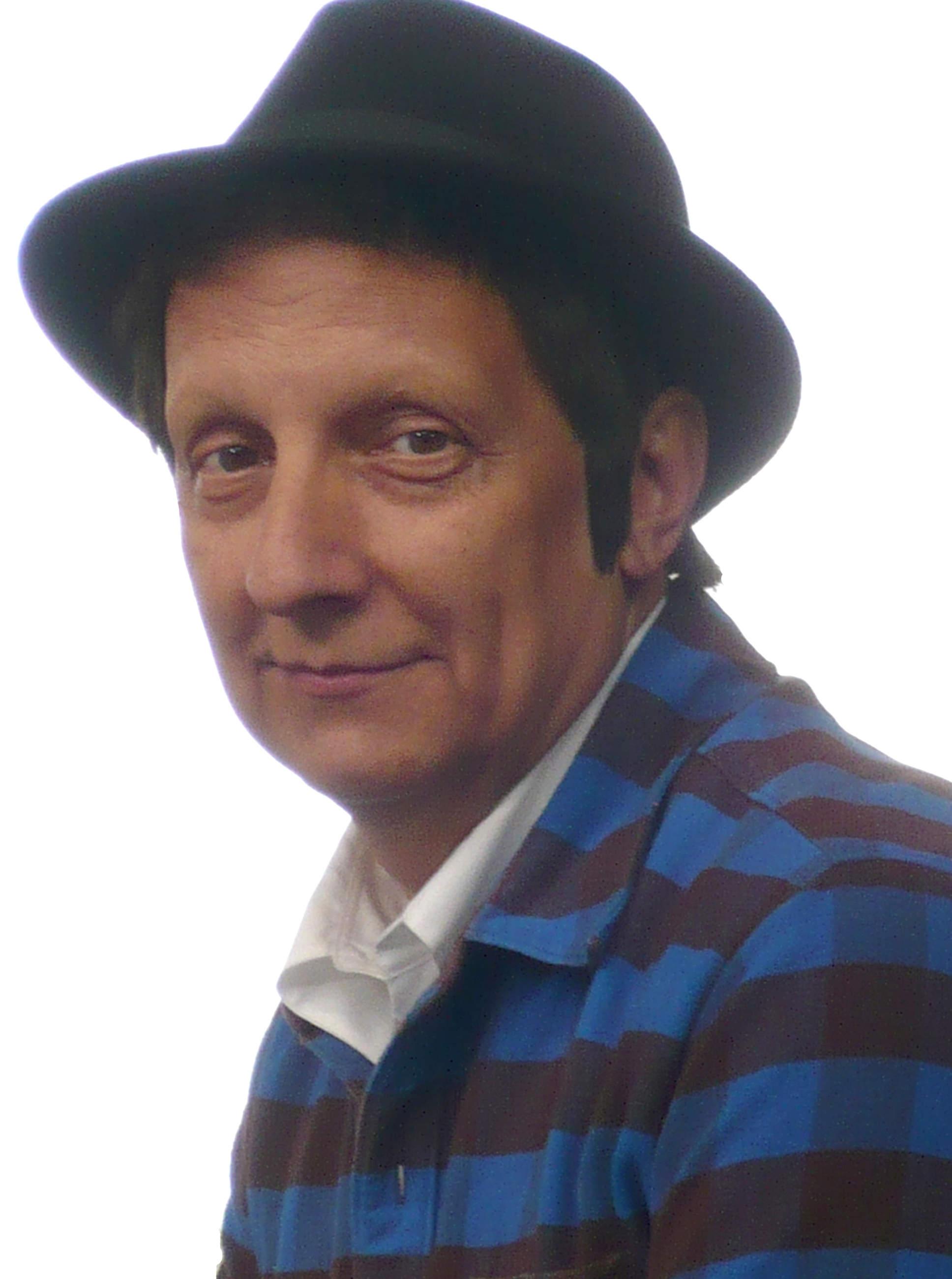
Robert Lepage worked with Gabriel on the staging design

Gabriel's sixth studio album Us was released at the end of September 1992, and was very quickly certified Gold in the UK. Responding to this success, Gabriel planned a concert tour. In November, he spoke to Quebec-based stage director Robert Lepage about putting together a show based on extensive use of video projection screens, and multiple stages linked by railway track. However, U2 was already incorporating massive video elements on their Zoo TV Tour, and Gabriel did not want to copy their style. The railway idea proved impractical, so Gabriel and Lepage met with German design firm Atelier Markgraph for a brainstorming session, to formulate a tour concept. Early the next year, British director Dave "T" Taraskevics joined Gabriel and Lepage in meetings with scenic designers and the team from Atelier Markgraph. A dual-stage design emerged, with a square stage representing masculine energy paired with a circular stage representing feminine energy. A bridge or catwalk would run between the two stages, complete with a conveyor belt to form a moving walkway. The square stage would be in the usual position at one end of the concert venue, while the circular stage would extend into the main seating area. The runway between them was to be about 80 feet (24 m) long. A living tree at the centre of the circular stage represented womanhood, while a red British telephone kiosk at the square stage represented manhood. The UK firm Brilliant Stages was hired to construct the stage equipment. Only one complete stage set-up was created; the production crew would not be able to "leap-frog" ahead with a second system to ease the gruelling back-to-back installation/tear-down schedule.

Complex tour production included two performance stages linked by moving walkway, with a large, rotating video screen over the square stage, and a translucent dome over the circular stage

A video projection screen was rigged over the square stage; it could be lowered to the stage, or revolved in place by motors. A translucent white dome and associated lighting rig was flown over the circular stage with the ability to lower the dome on command, completely covering the stage. Trapdoors in the two stages, equipped with lifts, allowed performers to rise up from below, or descend out of view. The moving walkway brought performers and props smoothly from one stage to the other. Two complete sets of band gear were used, allowing musicians to shift quickly between the two stages. Extensive radio-frequency wireless technology provided freedom of movement for Gabriel and most of his band, except for drum sets, guitar amps and keyboard rigs which were connected by cabling. Stage crew were very busy throughout the show, moving props and set pieces underneath the two stages, operating the trapdoors and lifts, and striking or re-setting band gear. Two control booths flanked the stage, one for the lighting desk and show director Dave T, the other for multiple sound mixing consoles.

Brilliant Stages, a division of the Samuelson Group, built the pair of stages linked by moving walkway. Gabriel appreciated the results. He said that "having two places to go, the feeling of playing two stages, was quite different from the usual show where everybody's pointing the same way and the energy is going in the same direction." Lepage insisted the band learn to dance together, even skipping together.

Britannia Row Productions provided the sound system, composed of 70 Turbosound Flashlight mid-high loudspeakers, 78 Flashlight low frequency enclosures, 34 near-field speakers made by Funktion One, and Turbosound TMS3 delay speakers as required. Gabriel's front of house mixer Peter Walsh said that the main speaker system was essentially running six loudspeaker zones in monaural (mono) sound rather than stereo, with occasional musical elements given a directional emphasis. The square stage held the main arrays of speakers, with mid-high boxes flown overhead, and low frequency boxes stacked on the floor, while a smaller but similar layout surrounded most of the circular stage. Walsh mixed the majority of microphones on a Yamaha PM4000, assisted by the audio crew leader Huw Richards mixing drum microphones on a Yamaha PM3000. A third mixer made by Sonosax was used to blend in pre-recorded tracks. The outboard gear included Lexicon PCM70 reverbs, TC Electronic graphic equalizers, and BSS Varicurves—all of these digital devices were controlled by an Apple PowerBook sending MIDI scene changes.

The band's stage monitor system relied largely on radio-frequency wireless in-ear monitors (IEM), along with a few traditional foldback loudspeakers for effects, and to serve as a back-up in case the IEMs stopped working. Gabriel was hesitant to change his monitor style and accept IEMs, but upon testing them he was thoroughly convinced. Independent engineer Bryan Olson of New York–based Firehouse Productions provided some of the equipment and mixed the band's monitors.

On 10 April 1993, just three days before the first concert date, the touring line-up performed "Steam" and "In Your Eyes" in New York City on Saturday Night Live. Gabriel stood in the front with Tony Levin on bass, David Rhodes on guitar, and L. Shankar on violin. Behind them was Joy Askew on keyboards and Manu Katché on drums.

The complex production suffered from too few technical rehearsals before opening to the public; Sound on Sound magazine wrote that "the first couple of weeks of 'The Secret World Tour' formed a not-so-secret rehearsal session." Robert Lepage and Peter Gabriel would collaborate again on two of his tours, the Growing Up Tour (2002–2005) and the i/o Tour (2023).

== Synopsis ==
The concert opened with darkness and the sound of the pre-recorded instrumental "Zaar" from Gabriel's 1989 album Passion. For some concerts, this was followed by solo duduk played by the guest musician Levon Minassian interpreting the composition "The Feeling Begins", also from Passion. Most concerts omitted the duduk solo, and "Zaar" was instead followed by a red British telephone box rising up from the square stage with Peter Gabriel illuminated inside, singing "Come Talk to Me" into a telephone handset. Gabriel was joined by either Sinéad O'Connor or Paula Cole rising up from the circular stage into the light to sing backing vocals. Gabriel emerged from the telephone box, straining toward his female counterpart with the handset cord taut with tension, pulling further and further from the box as Gabriel moves by way of the conveyor belt toward the circular stage.

"Quiet Steam" served as a prelude to the masculine and energetic "Steam", performed by the ensemble. Industrial mechanisms were shown on screen, and jets of visible white vapour shot up from the stage. Next was "Games Without Frontiers", a song from Gabriel's 1980 self-titled album.

The WOMAD song "Across the River" followed, with Gabriel in some concerts asking the audience to sing notes which were then sampled to create a synthesized choir for the song. Gabriel held a rain stick and pantomimed the role of oarsman while the band members "floated" from the square to the circular stage.

The instrumental "Slow Marimbas" was Gabriel's composition from the 1984 film Birdy. An extended performance of the feminine-themed "Shaking the Tree" was used by Gabriel as an opportunity to introduce the three longest-serving band members individually on the circular stage. A red lighting wash covered the male–female duet "Blood of Eden", leading into "San Jacinto" from Gabriel's self-titled 1982 album. Gabriel piloted a shipwreck raft from the circular stage to the square stage where he pantomimed behind the screen, lit from behind to show a giant silhouette.

Gabriel's song "Lovetown", from the 1993 film Philadelphia, preceded the feminine-themed "Digging in the Dirt", for which Gabriel wore a miniature video camera to provide distorted views of his face to the video projection screen, intercut later with distortions of the other musicians' faces. Gabriel revealed a large white sculptured face looking up from the circular stage. The song "Washing of the Water" was followed by Gabriel's first solo hit, "Solsbury Hill", featuring the musicians skipping around the stage as children, accompanied by projected visuals of Gabriel's youth. Gabriel sang and played harmonica for "Kiss That Frog", and the video screen showed him and other musicians looking down through a clear basin of water, captured by a video camera under the stage aimed upward through the water.

The hit song "Sledgehammer" was followed by "Secret World", the tour's theme song and the show finale. Images of revolving furniture transitioned to revolving heads of the band members. A stream of luggage moved down the conveyor belt to the square stage, reminiscent of an airport baggage handling system, to indicate that the musicians were leaving. Gabriel opened the last and largest piece of luggage over the trap door, and each musician stepped into the luggage and disappeared. Gabriel closed this large suitcase and appeared to struggle with it toward the center stage where a blue-lit dome descended from above to cover and conceal him.

== Reception ==
The tour received mixed reviews for its theatricality and for the music. Jon Pareles caught the show in April 1993, and wrote in The New York Times that Gabriel's dance moves looked forced rather than natural, that the intimacy he sought in his reflective songs was prevented by the cheerful dance routines of the preceding songs. By contrast, Susan Richardson of Rolling Stone found that the focus on male–female tension was successful: "The result is tantamount to a religious rite, merging grandeur with the intimacy of feeling, the public with the secret." For the Chicago Reader, Kevin McKeough wrote that Gabriel's elaborate staging "frequently overwhelmed" Gabriel's "often-brilliant performance". McKeough praised "the continuity of ideas and images" projected on the video screen, but he criticized the technical failures he witnessed, including several microphone malfunctions, the unforgivingly boomy room acoustics of the Rosemont Horizon Arena, and the uneven mix marred by occasional voices or instruments delivered piercingly loud.

Retrospective reviews based on the concert recording Secret World Live are universally positive. In a Guardian article published in 2003, James Griffiths wrote that Gabriel's Secret World Tour staging and musicianship combined well: "The total effect was surprisingly focused and intimate, with Gabriel's confessional singing style providing an emotional anchor for the ever-shifting visuals." PopMatters wrote in 2012 that the Secret World Tour was an "unforgettable stage show" exploring Jungian themes. PopMatters opined that Gabriel used visual elements with more skill than "his contemporaries—including U2". Singer Paula Cole was named as "one of the real stars" of the show, proving that she was equal to the task of covering Kate Bush, and superior to Sinéad O'Connor.

== Personnel ==
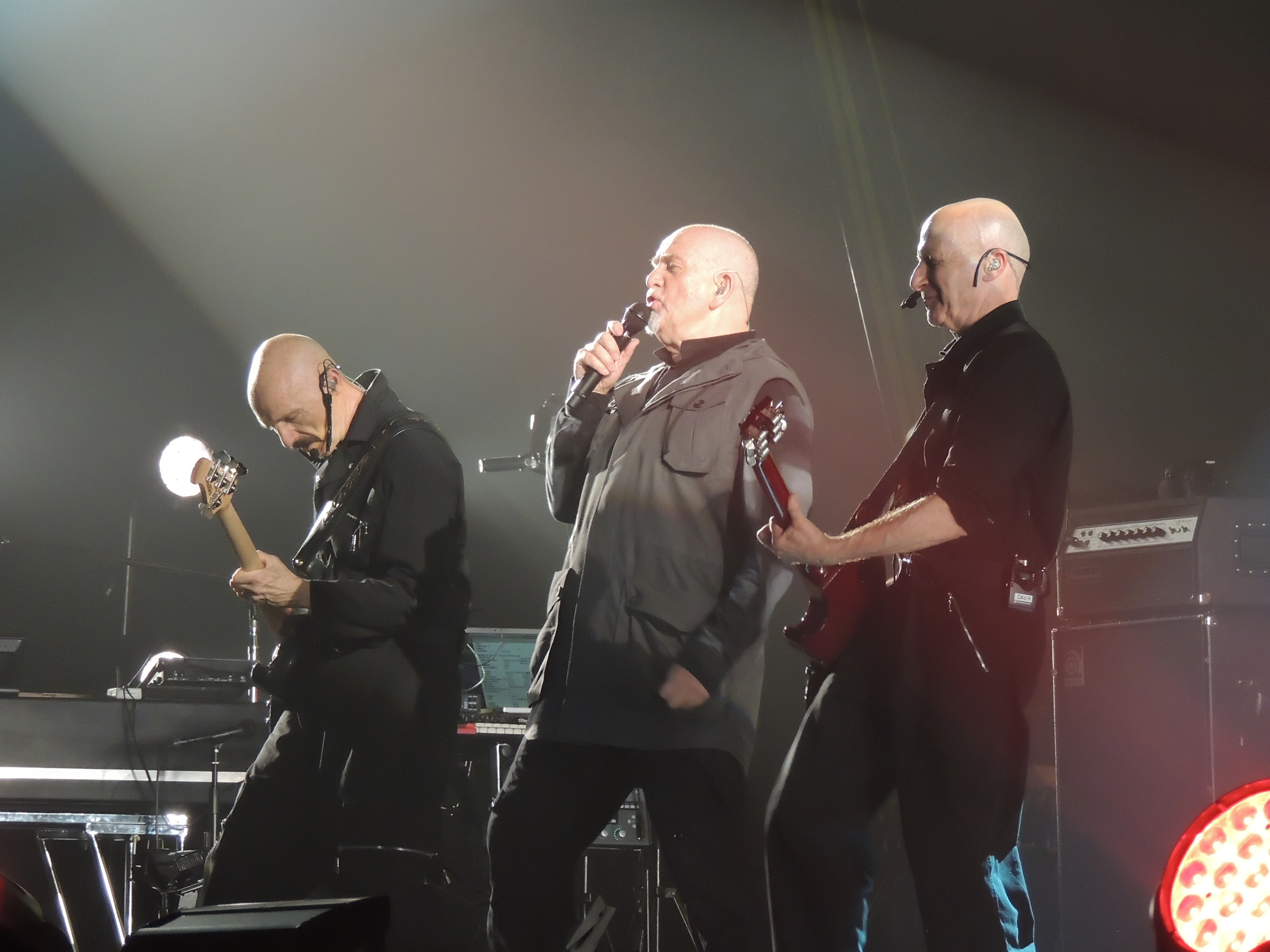
Tony Levin and David Rhodes flank Gabriel in a 2014 performance

- Peter Gabriel – lead vocals, keyboards, harmonica, rain stick, tambourine
- Tony Levin – bass, Chapman stick, synthesizer, backing vocals
- David Rhodes – guitar, backing vocals
- Manu Katché – drums, backing vocals
- L. Shankar – violin, backing vocals
- Levon Minassian – doudouk
- Joy Askew – keyboards, backing vocals, duet vocals (April–August 1993)
- Sinéad O'Connor – backing vocals, duet vocals (May–October 1993)
- Jean-Claude Naimro – keyboards, backing vocals (July 1993 onward)
- Paula Cole – backing vocals, duet vocals (November 1993 onward)

=== Duet vocalists ===
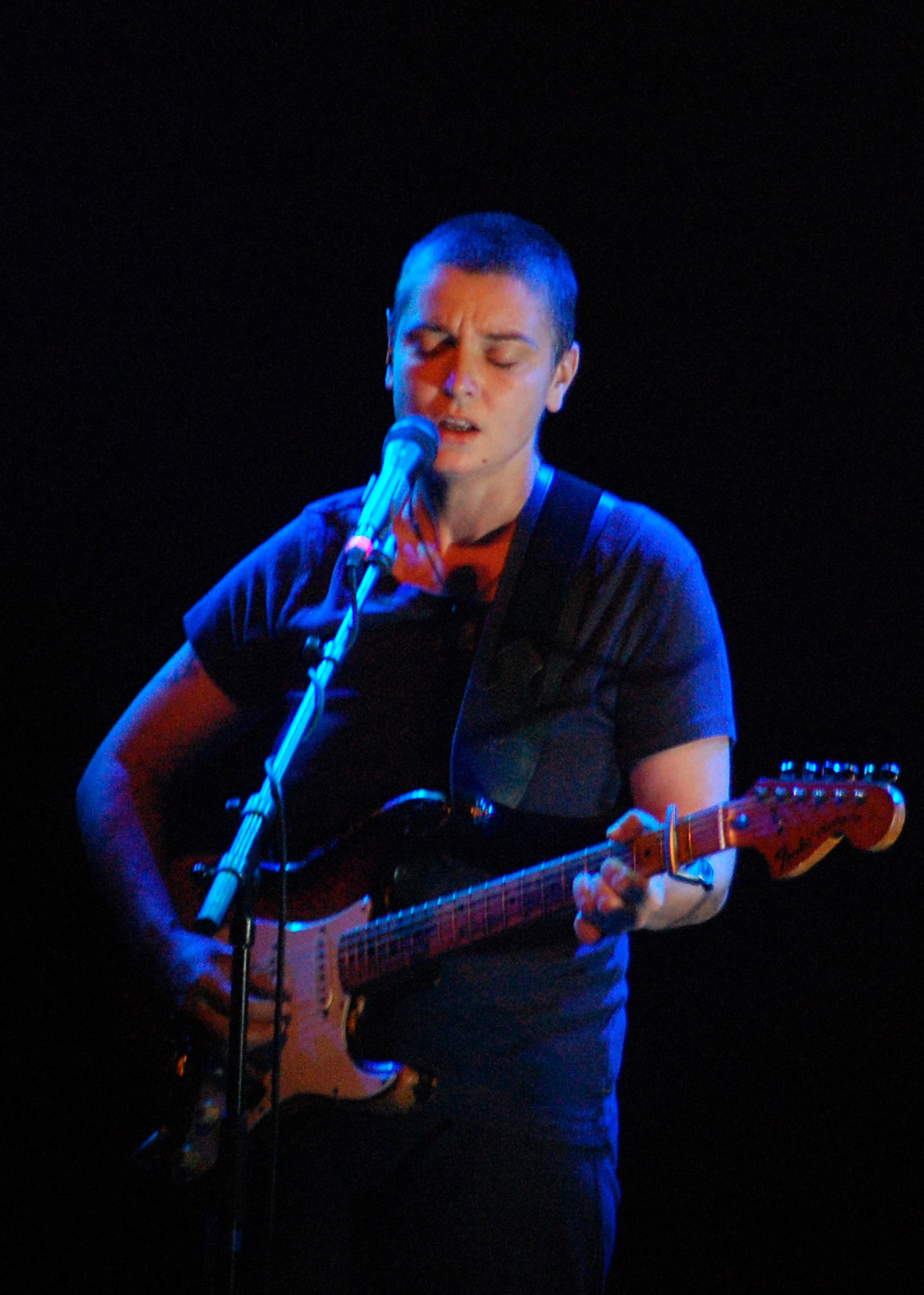
Sinéad O'Connor toured for a few months in mid-1993

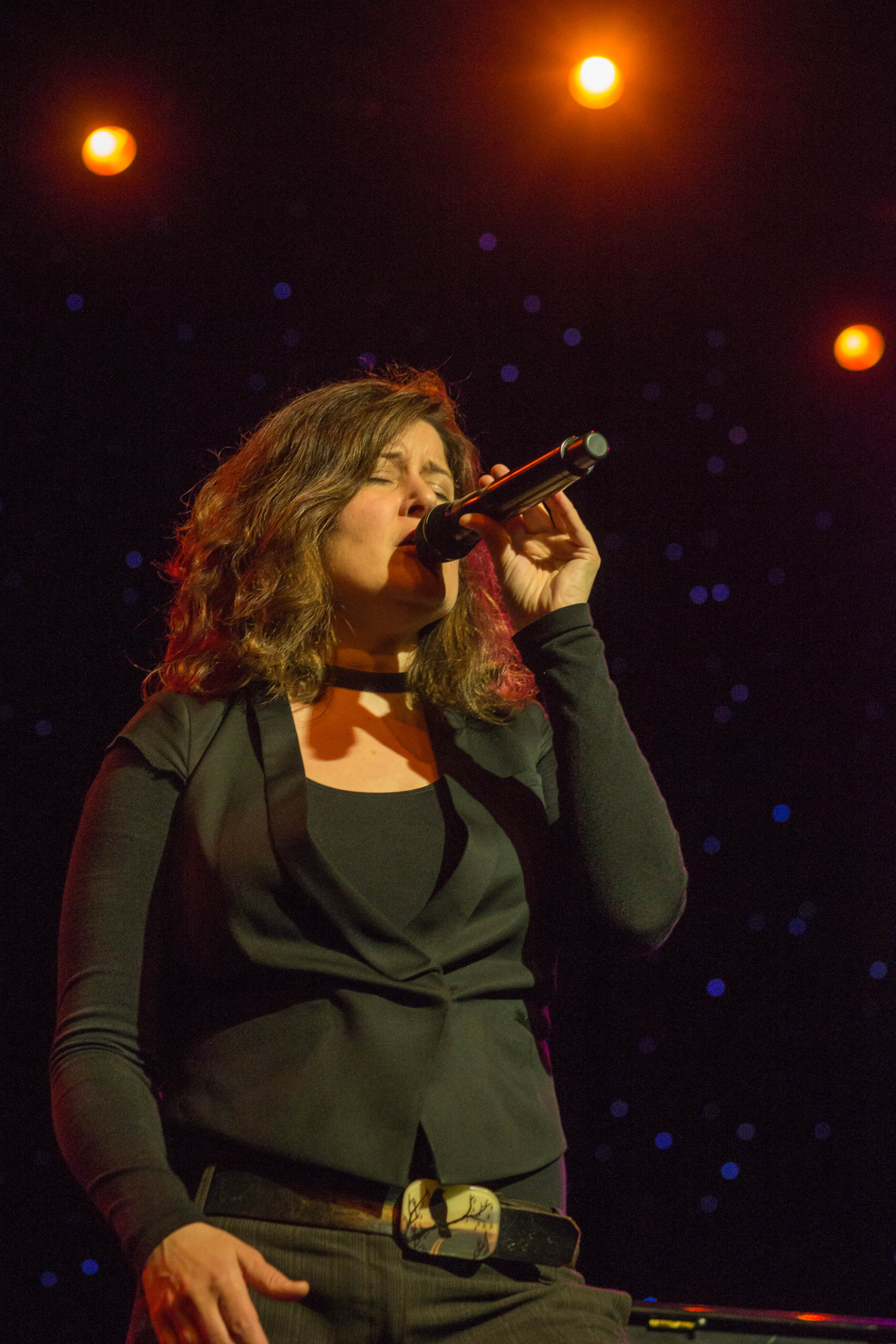
Paula Cole joined the tour in November 1993

Gabriel began the tour with North England–born Joy Askew playing keyboards and singing. She was the first woman in Gabriel's band. Askew had toured extensively with Joe Jackson and was living in New York City. Askew sang with Gabriel in the duets "Blood of Eden" and "Come Talk to Me". The New York Times praised her for conveying "ethereal tenderness" with her voice.

A few months into the tour, Irish singer-songwriter Sinéad O'Connor joined Gabriel in singing the duets. She had previously recorded "Blood of Eden" and "Come Talk to Me" at Gabriel's Real World Studios for the album Us. Unlike Askew, O'Connor did not support the production with additional keyboard parts, so Jean-Claude Naimro of Kassav' was hired in July for that role. Askew stayed through early August to train Naimro as her replacement.

O'Connor and Gabriel were linked romantically in the press, especially on 2 September 1993 when Gabriel appeared with O'Connor at his side at the 1993 MTV Video Music Awards. She continued to perform with Gabriel at WOMAD festivals until October when she left precipitously. She worked on her next album, Universal Mother, a process which she described as "therapy". The album's first single was "Thank You for Hearing Me", released in 1994; later she said that it was about breaking up with Gabriel.

To provide the tour with a female vocalist, Gabriel asked his colleagues for recommendations. Real World Studios engineer Kevin Killen suggested singer-songwriter Paula Cole in San Francisco, California. Gabriel telephoned Cole who flew immediately to Mannheim, Germany, to rehearse briefly before singing with Gabriel in front of a crowd of 16,000. With Cole on board, Gabriel added the 1986 Kate Bush collaboration "Don't Give Up" as an encore duet near the end of the concert. Cole was only a few days into the tour when the performance was filmed for Secret World Live, a concert video which earned a Grammy Award. The tour was Cole's first international exposure, and it boosted her solo career.

=== Guest musicians ===
Guest musicians appeared at certain concerts. Sinéad O'Connor appeared sporadically as a guest artist before she formally joined the tour. During the WOMAD festival in Chile, local stars Inti-Illimani shared the stage with Gabriel's band to play the song "Wallflower" from Gabriel's self-titled 1982 album. Jazz drummer Billy Cobham filled in for Manu Katché in May 1994 for a few dates when Katché was out sick. French-Armenian musician Levon Minassian played alone on the duduk at some concerts, following the pre-recorded "Zaar" intro with "The Feeling Begins"—both tunes from Gabriel's 1989 album Passion. In June 1994 in New York City, multi-instrumentalist Lenny Kravitz was added on guitar.

=== Opening acts ===
- Ayub Ogada – first leg
- Papa Wemba and his band Molokai, with guest Lucky Dube – WOMAD festival and second leg

== Tour crew ==
The show crew was headed by the British director Dave Taraskevics, known as "Dave T"; he continued to work with Gabriel on future shows. Britannia Row Productions, founded by Pink Floyd's concert team, provided sound equipment and crew. Gabriel personally asked Real World Studios sound engineer Peter Walsh to mix the concert series, based on Walsh's successful editing and mixing of Gabriel's Plays Live album. Walsh was reluctant to leave the studio, but he warmed to touring and stayed with Secret World to the end, totalling 162 concerts in a year-and-a-half. Walsh also mixed the double album Secret World Live as well as the film of the same name. Walsh found his thorough knowledge of the show to be an enormous asset later in the studio, mixing the 96 channels of multi-track recordings to create the live album and concert video.

In early August 1993, one of the crew tour buses collided at speed with a heavy dustbin lorry on a highway in Leesburg, Florida, seriously injuring the 18-year-old American bus driver, and sending assistant stage manager John Gray to the hospital for surgery to treat a deep cut on his leg. The concert series was not affected.

Members of the production crew produced a humorous secret newsletter titled Us and Them, containing tales of tour hi-jinks and "unpublishable" anecdotes. Gabriel discovered the newsletter, but allowed it to continue. Many of the crew were involved in practical jokes played on each other and on Gabriel: among these were plastic "trick" dog faeces the crew placed on a stage lift that brought Gabriel up from the floor to the stage, and a seven-foot-high (2.1 m) model of the Statue of Liberty that was purloined from the props department of a Paris concert hall, and placed on the conveyor belt during the finale that night.

- Robert Lepage – designer
- Dave Taraskevics – director
- Dave Perry – tour manager
- Dave Russell – production manager
- Alia Dann – assistant production manager
- John Gray, David Gray, Paul Mauradian, Bob Mardon – assistant stage managers
- Bob Weber, David Perry, Lynn Whitehead – props
- Brilliant Stages – stage builders
  - Robbie Earls – head carpenter
  - Barrie Knight – carpenter, later security manager
  - Vince Foster, Archie Hoey, Andrew Pearson – carpenters
- Peter Walsh – touring sound mixer, front of house
- Adrian Dessent – guitar tech
- Ian Gault – drum tech
- James Monkman – keyboard tech
- Doriana Sanchez – choreographer
- Britannia Row Productions – sound system supplier
  - Huw Richards – sound crew lead
  - Chris Hey, Steve Spencer, Sarne Thorogood, Ian Callender and Paul "Paddy" Addison – sound technicians
  - Julian Tether – radio-frequency coordination, wireless microphones and in-ear monitors
  - Mick Staplehurst – radios
  - Rick Pope – monitor technician
- Bryan Olson – monitor mixer
- Neg Earth Lights – lighting and rigging
  - Patrick Woodroffe – lighting designer
  - Jonathan Sellers – lighting crew lead
  - Dennis Gardener – lighting operator
  - Bill Surtees – moving light operator
  - Dave Waldon, John Shelley, Donny Ludico, Ed Duda – lighting crew
- Stage Kinetic – dome and screen rigging
  - Gary Currier, Klaus Hoffman – riggers
- Melville Presentation – video production
  - Ian Henderson – video engineer
  - Des Fallon – visual mix
  - Bob Simmons – camera
  - James Polk – animator, technical director
- Marie-Anne Capdeville – stylist
- Michi Nakao – make-up
- Annie Parsons – assistant to Peter Gabriel
- Parachute – wardrobe
  - Nicola Pelly, Harry Parnass – wardrobe designers
  - Patsy Rochford Smith – wardrobe
  - Alessandra Accoroni – wardrobe assistant
- Phoenix Buses – crew buses
- Stagestruck Trucks – transportation

== Set list ==
Gabriel often made small changes to the tour set list throughout the tour. A typical set list is as follows: "Zaar" (introduction, pre-recorded on tape)

1. "Come Talk to Me" (duet)
2. "Quiet Steam" (prelude to "Steam")
3. "Steam"
4. "Games Without Frontiers"
5. "Across the River"
6. "Slow Marimbas" (instrumental, from the 1984 film Birdy)
7. "Shaking the Tree"
8. "Blood of Eden" (duet)
9. "San Jacinto"
10. "Lovetown" (from the 1993 film Philadelphia)
11. "Kiss That Frog"
12. "Washing of the Water"
13. "Solsbury Hill"
14. "Digging in the Dirt"
15. "Sledgehammer"
16. "Secret World" (finale)
17. "In Your Eyes" (encore)
18. "Biko" (encore)

Other songs that may have been performed at various dates include the duet "Don't Give Up", "Only Us", "Love to Be Loved", "Mercy Street", "Family Snapshot", "Wallflower", "Red Rain" and "Shock the Monkey". A few times Gabriel performed a stripped-down solo version of "Here Comes the Flood" as a third encore, at least once in the German language as Jetzt kommt die Flut.

== Tour dates ==
- First leg: April–August 1993 in Europe and North America
- WOMAD festival: August–October 1993 in Europe and all the Americas
- Second leg: November 1993 in Europe
- Third leg: February–March 1994 in Asia and Oceania
- WOMAD festival: May–August 1994 in Europe, North Africa, Asia and the US

Gabriel and his band previewed and practised the tour set list at concerts in Australia, Canada and the US in the months leading up to the Secret World Tour. These "warm-up" performances did not include the elaborate staging design. The first official Secret World Tour date with extensive staging was performed on 13 April 1993 in Sweden at the Stockholm Globe Arena.

Gabriel considered the preview concerts, the Secret World concerts, and the WOMAD festivals to be part of the same 17-month tour which ended 14 August 1994 at the Woodstock '94 festival in New York with Gabriel as headliner at the main stage.
