= Blood of Eden =

Single by Peter Gabriel

from the album Us
- B-side: "Mercy Street"
- Released: 15 March 1993
- Studio: Real World (Box, England)
- Length: 4:57 (radio edit); 6:35 (album version)
- Label: Real World; Virgin
- Songwriter: Peter Gabriel
- Producers: Daniel Lanois; Peter Gabriel

Peter Gabriel singles chronology
"Steam" (1992)	"Blood of Eden" (1993)	"Kiss That Frog" (1993)

Music video
- "Peter Gabriel - Blood Of Eden" on YouTube

"Blood of Eden" is the third single from English rock musician Peter Gabriel's sixth album, Us (1992), featuring backing vocals by Irish singer-songwriter Sinéad O'Connor. It was written by Gabriel and produced by him with Daniel Lanois. The single was released in March 1993 by Real World and Virgin, and narrowly failed to enter the UK top 40, peaking at number 43.

The single has two B-side tracks: A remix of "Mercy Street" (originally from Gabriel's previous studio album So, released in 1986) by William Orbit and an earlier version of the a-side. This version had originally appeared in the Wim Wenders film Until the End of the World (1991) but was not included on the official soundtrack.

== Background ==
Gabriel expressed his desire to have "two emotional, needy voices" on "Blood of Eden" and selected Sinead O'Connor to provide the female counterpart. O'Connor also served a similar role on "Come Talk to Me", a song that opened Gabriel's Us album. O'Connor's voice enters during the chorus and is accompanied by Gabriel in his regular vocal register and Daniel Lanois covering the higher-pitched harmonies. An earlier mix of "Blood of Eden", titled "Kiss the Bliss", was recorded in May 1991 and predated the addition of O'Connor's vocals.

Gabriel recalled that he encountered difficulties in achieving a suitable backing track and that Lanois, who assisted with the song's production, was dubious about the song's merits. The two believed that "the rhythmic content verged on sounding trite", so they attempted four or five grooves before settling on a less is more approach to the instrumentation. One version of the song from 10 December 1991 was referred to by Gabriel as the "Tears Mix" and had a reggae feel, but this approach was deemed unsuitable. The final mix of the song was centered around percussion and synthesisers, with Levon Minassian also contributing musical passages on a duduk.

Lyrically, the song pulls from the economic woes found on "Don't Give Up", with lines lamenting about not having insurance. Biblical themes are also interlaced in the song, including references to crucifixes and the Garden of Eden. Gabriel said that he took some lyrical inspiration from Martin Scorsese, who "at one point had a dagger in the shape of a crucifix". When commenting on the matter in a 1992 interview, Gabriel expressed his belief that Scorsese's imagery was both "powerful" and "quite theatrical". He felt that these lyrics bordered on being too melodramatic but nonetheless opted to keep them. Gabriel said that he "wanted to use a biblical image in 'Blood of Eden' because it was the time when man and woman were in one body, and in a sense maybe in a relationship."

== Critical reception ==
Reviewing the song for The Independent, Andy Gill praised the vocals of O'Connor as "particularly effective", saying that she demonstrated "all the qualities of emotional depth mysteriously absent from her own album of torch-song covers." Music Week characterised the song as a "haunting soundscape" and "a vaguely Celtic offering, rendered more so by Sinead O'Connor's vocal support."

Dave Morrison of Select magazine described Gabriel's vocals as "break[ing] out passionately on 'Blood of Eden' over a finely wrought instrumental web". Writing for Entertainment Weekly, David Browne called "Blood of Eden" a "very pretty and understated edge-of-breakup song" that was "one of the album's highlights".

== Artwork and music video ==
Zadok Ben-David was commissioned to design a piece of artwork for the song within the liner notes of Us. He chose to depict a series of individuals inside of a "cosmic egg", which he described as a "mythological symbol of nothingness and wholeness, the very beginning of the universal creation." His original idea was to depict "a man and woman inside a man" to align with the theme of the song, but he thought that this interpretation was too literal and ultimately decided against it. The single artwork was illustrated by Malcolm Garrett, who incorporated aspects of Ben-David's work within the design.

Ben-David created the sculptures in the song's music video, which was directed by Nichola Bruce and Mike Coulson. Robert Lepage had some input on the creative direction of the music video, who encouraged Bruce and Coulson to focus on how to "create atmospheres in a very simple but powerful way". To that end, several models of animals and humans were interspersed with footage of real people, and a tree made out of logs was also included. A limited budget was allocated for the filming of "Blood of Eden", so much of the footage was filmed around Real World Studios using local personnel that included Alan Snow, who handled the animation, Annie Symons, who provided the costumes, and Lynne Whiteread, who was responsible for the art direction.

== Live performances ==
"Blood of Eden" was first performed live on the 1993–1994 Secret World Tour. The female vocal part of the song was performed first by British musician Joy Askew, then by Sinéad O'Connor for a few months, and finally by American singer-songwriter Paula Cole. Cole's duet with Gabriel was released on the Secret World Live album, as well as on the Secret World Live concert film.

In 2011, Gabriel re-released the song with orchestral background as a bonus track on the album New Blood. A recording from Gabriel's New Blood concert tour was also included on Gabriel's Live Blood album in 2012, which was recorded over the course of two nights at the Hammersmith Apollo in London.

== Track listing ==
All songs were written by Peter Gabriel.

- CD single
1. "Blood of Eden" (album version) – 6:33
2. "Mercy Street" (William Orbit mix) – 8:00
3. "Blood of Eden" (Special mix for Wim Wenders' Until the End of the World) – 6:15

== Personnel ==
- Peter Gabriel – lead vocals, keyboards, keyboard bass
- Tony Levin – bass guitars
- David Rhodes – 12-string guitars
- David Bottrill – programming
- Daniel Lanois – hi-hat, backing vocals
- Richard Blair – additional programming
- Levon Minassian – duduk
- Sinéad O'Connor – backing vocals
- Shankar – violin
- Gus Isidore – bridge guitars
- Richard Chappell – bridge section mix

== Charts ==
Chart (1993)	Peak position
Australia (ARIA)	112
Canada Top Singles (RPM)	73
Europe (European Hit Radio)	30
UK Singles (Official Charts)	43

== Cover version ==
Regina Spektor recorded a cover of "Blood of Eden" for the 2013 And I'll Scratch Yours compilation album, which featured renditions of Gabriel compositions from artists he had covered on his 2010 Scratch My Back album. Spektor had originally considered "Family Snapshot", but after listening to Gabriel's cover of "Après Moi", she decided to go with a song that was both "mysterious" and "mystical" and felt that "Blood of Eden" fulfilled those points of criteria. She attempted a "world music-type sound", but felt that the arrangement did not work without the same musicians who played on the original recording. She then reworked the production until "it started to feel like a song".
