= Secret World Live =

Live album by Peter Gabriel
- Released: 30 August 1994
- Recorded: 16–17 November 1993
- Venues: Palasport Nuovo, Modena, Italy
- Genres: Art rock; worldbeat
- Length: 99:45
- Labels: Geffen (US and Canada); Real World/Virgin
- Producers: Peter Gabriel; Peter Walsh

Peter Gabriel chronology
Peter Gabriel Revisited (1992)	Secret World Live (1994)	OVO (2000)

Singles from Secret World Live
- 1. "Red Rain" Released: 22 August 1994

Professional ratings
Review scores
Source	Rating
AllMusic	1.5/5 stars
Entertainment Weekly	C+
Music Week	3/5 stars
Rolling Stone	4/5 stars

Secret World Live is the second live album and tenth album overall by the English rock musician Peter Gabriel, released on 30 August 1994 in the UK. The album documents the concert experience of the Secret World Tour. A concert film released on DVD, also called Secret World Live, was released simultaneously whose track listing omits "Red Rain" and adds "San Jacinto" after "Blood of Eden".

== Recording ==
The album was recorded over the two nights of 16 and 17 November 1993 at the Palasport Nuovo in Modena, Italy. A companion release, SW Live EP, recorded over the same two nights, included the live tracks "Red Rain", "Digging in the Dirt" and "Come Talk to Me" from this release, as well as "San Jacinto" and a recording of "Mercy Street" from Live in Athens 1987, though the specific track listing varies by release by country.

== Cover artwork ==
The artwork for the album cover was directed by Michael Colson and co-ordinated by Martha Ladly (formerly of Martha and the Muffins) who was working for Gabriel at the time, with cover images by Fab 4 and Danny Jenkins. It received a nomination for the 1994 Grammy Award for Best Record Sleeve Packaging Design. Danny Jenkins said of his photograph: "I have always been interested in making images and had amassed an extensive collection of 80s office detritus for my digital montages [...] The core photograph of the album was shot in my studio back yard with my Pentax K1000 camera [...] The receiver was randomly picked from a pile of phones and the hand actually belongs to my long-suffering studio assistant Becky Jemmett. It was pure luck and chance that the phone and hand were a convincing enough match for Peter's on-stage version."

== Track listing ==
All tracks are written by Peter Gabriel, except "Across the River", written by Stewart Copeland, Gabriel, David Rhodes, and L. Shankar, and "Shaking the Tree", written by Gabriel and Youssou N'Dour.

Disc one
No.	Title	Length
1.	"Come Talk to Me"	6:13
2.	"Steam"	7:45
3.	"Across the River"	6:00
4.	"Slow Marimbas"	1:41
5.	"Shaking the Tree"	9:18
6.	"Red Rain"	6:15
7.	"Blood of Eden"	6:58
8.	"Kiss That Frog"	5:58
9.	"Washing of the Water"	4:07
10.	"Solsbury Hill"	4:42

Disc two
No.	Title	Length
1.	"Digging in the Dirt"	7:36
2.	"Sledgehammer"	4:58
3.	"Secret World"	9:10
4.	"Don't Give Up"	7:35
5.	"In Your Eyes"	11:32
Total length:		99:45

== Personnel ==
- Peter Gabriel – lead vocals, harmonica, keyboards, rainstick
- Paula Cole – additional vocals; co-lead vocals on "Shaking The Tree", "Blood Of Eden" and "Don't Give Up".
- L. Shankar – violins, additional vocals
- David Rhodes – guitar, backing vocals
- Jean-Claude Naimro – keyboards, backing vocals
- Tony Levin – bass, Chapman Stick, backing vocals
- Manu Katché – drums
- Levon Minassian – doudouk

Guest artists

- Papa Wemba and his band Molokai
  - Papa Wemba – vocals
  - Patrick Marie Magdelaine – guitar
  - Dominique Berose – keyboards
  - Herve Rakotofiringa – keyboards
  - Noel Ekwabi – bass
  - Joseph Kuo – drums
  - Xavier Jouvelet – percussion
  - "Reddy" Mela Amissi – backing vocals
  - "Styno Mubi Matadi" – backing vocals
  - Ayub Ogada – backing vocals

== Charts ==
=== Weekly charts ===
Weekly chart performance for Secret World Live
Chart (1994)	Peak position
Australian Albums (ARIA)	34
Austrian Albums (Ö3 Austria)	8
Canada Top Albums/CDs (RPM)	24
Dutch Albums (Album Top 100)	16
European Albums (Music & Media)	7
French Albums (SNEP)	4
German Albums (Offizielle Top 100)	8
Italian Albums (Musica e Dischi)	11
Scottish Albums (Official Charts)	13
Swedish Albums (Sverigetopplistan)	24
Swiss Albums (Schweizer Hitparade)	10
UK Albums (Official Charts)	10
US Billboard 200	23

Chart (2020)	Peak position
Belgian Albums (Ultratop Wallonia)	80

=== Year-end charts ===
Year-end chart performance for Secret World Live
Chart (1994)	Position
German Albums (Offizielle Top 100)	70

== Certifications and sales ==
Certifications and sales for Secret World Live
Region	Certification	Certified units/sales
Australia (ARIA)	Gold	35,000^{^}
Canada (Music Canada)	Gold	50,000^{^}
France (SNEP)	Gold	100,000^{*}
Germany (BVMI)	Gold	250,000^{^}
Italy (FIMI)	2× Platinum	200,000^{*}
Japan	—	105,000
New Zealand (RMNZ)	Gold	7,500^{^}
United Kingdom (BPI)	Silver	60,000^{^}
United States (RIAA)	Gold	500,000^{^}
^{*} Sales figures based on certification alone.^{^} Shipments figures based on certification alone.
