= And I'll Scratch Yours =

Studio album by various artists
- Released: 24 September 2013
- Recorded: 2009–2013
- Genre: Art rock
- Length: 54:43
- Label: Real World
- Producer: Peter Gabriel

Peter Gabriel chronology
Live Blood (2012)	And I'll Scratch Yours (2013)	Back to Front: Live in London (2014)

Professional ratings
Aggregate scores
Source	Rating
Metacritic	63/100
Review scores
Source	Rating
AllMusic	3/5 stars
Pitchfork	4.9/10

And I'll Scratch Yours (originally announced as I'll Scratch Yours) is a compilation album developed by the English rock musician Peter Gabriel. Initially slated for release in 2010, the album was released on 24 September 2013. The original concept was that And I'll Scratch Yours would serve as a companion piece to Gabriel's 2010 covers album Scratch My Back. The idea was to give the artists whose songs Gabriel covered on Scratch My Back a medium to reciprocate – And I'll Scratch Yours would feature those artists covering Gabriel's songs. Three artists, David Bowie, Neil Young and Radiohead, declined to record covers of Gabriel's material, so Brian Eno, Joseph Arthur and Feist contributed covers to the album instead.

== Album history ==
And I'll Scratch Yours was originally announced and scheduled for release in 2010, but several artists failed to deliver material as promised, or declined to participate in the project altogether. The album was subsequently postponed, though six tracks from it were released on iTunes between January and June 2010, and two of those tracks have also appeared on vinyl, as B-sides. In October 2011, Gabriel stated that he had "given up" waiting for the remaining artists to contribute to the project, and was looking to have other artists record cover material so that he could release And I'll Scratch Yours sometime "next year" (i.e., 2012). Eventually, Feist and Joseph Arthur were recruited to cover for some of the missing artists, and the album was announced for release on 23 September 2013.

=== Tracks released in 2010 ===
Twelve artists were covered by Gabriel on the Scratch My Back album — thirteen, if one includes the cover of the Kinks' "Waterloo Sunset" (written by Ray Davies) on the limited edition bonus disc. Only six artists originally submitted reciprocal covers of Gabriel material in connection with I'll Scratch Yours. Gabriel originally intended to release Scratch My Back and I'll Scratch Yours simultaneously, but as completion of the latter dragged out, it was instead decided to release a series of double A-sided singles with one song from each album every new full moon during 2010 on iTunes. In order of release, the I'll Scratch Yours tracks were:

- "Not One of Us" – Stephin Merritt (30 January 2010)
- "Biko" – Paul Simon (28 February)
- "Come Talk to Me" – Bon Iver (30 March)
- "Solsbury Hill" – Lou Reed (28 April)
- "Mercy Street" – Elbow (27 May)
- "I Don't Remember" – David Byrne (26 June)

On 17 April 2010 "The Book of Love" (by Gabriel) backed with "Not One of Us" (by Merritt) as well as "Flume" (by Gabriel) backed with "Come Talk to Me" (by Bon Iver) were released on 7" vinyl to independent record stores.

=== Later developments ===
Of the seven remaining artists covered on Scratch My Back, Radiohead, David Bowie, Neil Young, and Ray Davies declined to participate in the I'll Scratch Yours project. It was reported on a January 2010 Peter Gabriel podcast that Radiohead would cover "Wallflower" from Gabriel's fourth self-titled album. Gabriel subsequently reported in an interview in The Guardian that they had withdrawn from the project after hearing his version of their song "Street Spirit (Fade Out)".

Regina Spektor, Randy Newman and Arcade Fire did ultimately submit material to the project, albeit later than expected. Brian Eno, who co-wrote "Heroes" with Bowie, covered "Mother of Violence". In an October 2011 interview published in Rolling Stone, Gabriel said, "I've sort of given up waiting for the others ... So now I think that I might try to find three or four other people to cover my stuff so that I can make an album out of that, and then get that out next year in some form.".

== Track listing ==
All songs written by Peter Gabriel except "Mother of Violence", written by Peter Gabriel and Jill Gabriel.

No.	Title	Performer	Length
1.	"I Don't Remember"	David Byrne	3:38
2.	"Come Talk to Me"	Bon Iver	6:20
3.	"Blood of Eden"	Regina Spektor	4:39
4.	"Not One of Us"	Stephin Merritt	3:49
5.	"Shock the Monkey"	Joseph Arthur	5:49
6.	"Big Time"	Randy Newman	3:29
7.	"Games Without Frontiers"	Arcade Fire	3:22
8.	"Mercy Street"	Elbow	5:28
9.	"Mother of Violence"	Brian Eno	3:00
10.	"Don't Give Up"	Feist feat. Timber Timbre	5:28
11.	"Solsbury Hill"	Lou Reed	5:24
12.	"Biko"	Paul Simon	4:19
Total length:			54:50

== Personnel ==
- Tony Cousins – mastering
- Marc Bessant – design, cover
- Steve Gschmeissner – cover, back cover
- David Hiscock – Peter Gabriel bloodspot
- Anna Gabriel – artists photography (except Lou Reed, Stephin Merritt, Arcade Fire, Feist and Regina Spektor)
- Lou Reed – photography (Lou Reed)
- Alex Hammond – photography (Stephin Merritt)
- Korey Richey – photography (Arcade Fire)
- Ben Feist – photography (Feist)
- Jack Dishel – photography (Regina Spektor)
- Nige Tassell – sleeve notes

=== "I Don't Remember" ===
- David Byrne – vocals, instruments
- Patrick Dillett – mixing

=== "Come Talk to Me" ===
- Sean Carey – drums
- Rick Lockwood – voice
- Kimberly Lockwood – voice
- Justin Vernon – all other instruments

=== "Blood of Eden" ===
- Joe Mendelson – production, arrangement, instruments, mixing
- Jack Dishel – production, arrangement, instruments, vocals
- Regina Spektor – production, arrangement, instruments, vocals

=== "Not One of Us" ===
- Stephin Merritt – production, recording, mixing
- Charles Newman – production, recording, mixing

=== "Shock the Monkey" ===
- Joseph Arthur – moog guitar, bass

=== "Big Time" ===
- Bruno Coon – production, mixing

=== "Games Without Frontiers" ===
- Arcade Fire – production
- Mark Lawson – recording
- Korey Richey – recording
- Tom Elmhirst – mixing

=== "Mercy Street" ===
- Elbow – production
- Craig Potter – mixing

=== "Don't Give Up" ===
- Mocky – organ, synthesizer, production
- Leslie Feist – vocals, guitar, synthesizer, pedals, production
- Taylor Kirk – vocals, guitar
- Paul Taylor – percussion
- Mika Posen – violin
- Morri$ – production
- Renaud Letang – mixing
- Robbie Lackritz – recording, engineering

=== "Solsbury Hill" ===
- Lou Reed – production, mixing
- Eric Kramer – engineering
- Mike Rathke – additional guitar
- Sarth Calhoun – additional programming

=== "Biko" ===
- Mark Stewart – cello

== Charts ==
Chart performance for Scratch My Back / And I'll Scratch Yours
Chart (2013–2014)	Peak position
Austrian Albums (Ö3 Austria)	24
Belgian Albums (Ultratop Flanders)	53
Belgian Albums (Ultratop Wallonia)	22
Dutch Albums (Album Top 100)	64
French Albums (SNEP)	127
German Albums (Offizielle Top 100)	19
Italian Albums (FIMI)	41
Swiss Albums (Schweizer Hitparade)	39
UK Compilation Albums (OCC)	26
US Billboard 200	193
US Independent Albums (Billboard)	29
