= Kiss That Frog =

1993 single by Peter Gabriel

Single by Peter Gabriel

from the album Us
- Released: 13 September 1993
- Length: 5:20 (album version); 4:15 (radio edit)
- Label: Real World; Virgin
- Songwriter: Peter Gabriel
- Producers: Daniel Lanois; Peter Gabriel

Peter Gabriel singles chronology
"Blood of Eden" (1993)	"Kiss That Frog" (1993)	"Lovetown" (1994)

Music video
- "Kiss That Frog" on YouTube

"Kiss That Frog" is a song by the English rock musician Peter Gabriel's sixth album, Us (1992). It was written by Gabriel and produced by him with Daniel Lanois. The song first charted in North America in February 1993, where it entered the RPM Canadian singles chart at No. 66, later going on to peak at No. 36 the following month. The song missed the US Billboard Hot 100 and instead reached number 18 on both the Billboard Modern Rock Tracks and Album Rock Tracks charts. In the United Kingdom, the song was released as a single in September 1993 by Real World and narrowly failed to enter the top 40, peaking at number 46.

The song was issued as a 7-inch single, CD single, and a limited edition CD maxi single, with all editions featuring the "Mindblender Mix", which was produced by both Gabriel and William Orbit. Both the CD and CD maxi single also included "Across the River", a song previously used as the b-side for Gabriel's 1982 "I Have the Touch" single.

The single art for "Kiss That Frog" was created by Jim Atkinson and Jim Cahill. Bili Bidjocka designed a separate piece of artwork for "Kiss That Frog" in the liner notes for Us; this piece of artwork depicts a frog in an aquarium and a blowup doll contained within a box.

== Background ==
Gabriel developed the lyrics "Kiss That Frog" after reading Bruno Bettelheim's The Uses of Enchantment, a book that employed the use of Freudian psychology to analyze fairy tales. Further inspiration was taken from The Frog Prince, a fairy tale written by The Brothers Grimm. Gabriel transformed the fairy tale into a sexual metaphor that depicted the princess as an innocent woman and the frog as a lusting male. The lyrics are sung from the frog's perspective and include euphemisms about being all puffed up, getting wet, and how the frog's tongue can kill.

The song's rhythm track dates back to 1984 when Gabriel was working on his Birdy soundtrack album. The Adzido Pan African Dance Ensemble supplied one of the percussion loops, Richard Blair was credited with programming, and Manny Elias, formerly of Tears for Fears, played Senegalese shakers. Some of these sounds comprise the song's intro, which also features soft keyboard chords that lead into an electric guitar riff played by David Rhodes. Maryln McFarlane sang backing vocals during certain portions of the song, including the fade-out. In his book Experiencing Peter Gabriel: A Listener's Companion, Durrell Bowman described the song as lacking a conventional chorus and said that the title-tag functioned as a "mini-chorus".

"Kiss That Frog" appeared on Gabriel's Secret World Tour and the accompanying Secret World Live concert film. During live performances from this tour, Gabriel and his bandmates were filmed through a pool of water contained within a trapdoor. In 2016, the song was revived for Gabriel's Rock, Paper, Scissors Tour, with Sting handling lead vocals.

== Critical reception ==
Author Graeme Scarfe highlighted Gabriel's vocal delivery on "Kiss That Frog", drawing comparisons to Otis Redding, who was an early influence on Gabriel. Scarfe stated that Gabriel's vocals "have never been richer", describing them as amongst the "throatiest" and "croakiest" of his career. Robert Christgau noted the sexual undertones of "Kiss That Frog" and identified it as the only fast song on Us other than "Steam". Greg Kot also identified "Kiss That Frog" as one of the few uptempo tracks on Us, adding that the song provided "much needed humor" to the album. In his review for Rolling Stone, Kot also thought the song was "instantly engaging and subversive", further commenting on the "queasy twist" that Gabriel gave to the fairy tale of The Frog Prince. Record Collector labeled "Kiss That Frog" as a "pleasing reconnect with his [Gabriel's] bizarro side."

== Music video ==
"Kiss That Frog" received a music video that was directed by Brett Leonard and produced by Carl Wyant through Palomar Pictures. The computer graphics were created by animators at Angel Studios and the live footage was filmed in high definition with a Sony CCD500 camera on a blue screen. A.E. Bunker was responsible for the video's hand-drawn illustrations. The opening of the music video was largely filmed from the perspective of an animated frog that navigates through various environments in pursuit of a brunette princess, who eventually falls down the innards of the frog and a series of psychedelic tunnels. Upon receiving a kiss from the princess, the frog transforms into a prince played by Gabriel.

The music video for "Kiss That Frog" was not immediately distributed to MTV and was instead initially played in a mobile 18-seat mini-theater installed at various theme parks across the country to coincide with Gabriel's Secret World Tour, with the first airing of the music video occurring at Raging Waters in San Dimas, California. Gabriel and Leonard collaborated with Iwerks Entertainment to develop the mini-theater's motion technology, including seat movements that synchronised with the images on the 9-by-16-foot screen. The audio for the music video was pulled from the "Mindblender Mix" created by William Orbit.

During the 1994 MTV Video Music Awards, the music video won an award for Best Visual Effects, beating out songs from Tool, Björk, and Aerosmith. It was also nominated for an MTV award for Best Editing, but lost to "Everybody Hurts" by R.E.M..

=== Accolades ===
Year	Nominee / work	Award	Result
1994	MTV Award	Best Special Effects in a Video	Won
1994	MTV Award	Best Editing in a Video	Nominated

== Track listing ==
- 7 inch single
1. "Kiss That Frog" (album edit) – 4:15
2. "Kiss That Frog" (Mindblender Mix [edit]) – 3:56
- CD single
1. "Kiss That Frog" (album edit) – 4:15
2. "Digging in the Dirt" (Rich E Mix) – 7:20
3. "Kiss That Frog" (Mindblender Mix) – 6:45
- CD digipak single
1. "Kiss That Frog" (album edit) – 4:15
2. "Across the River" – 7:10
3. "Kiss That Frog" (Mindblender Mix [edit]) – 3:56
4. "Shaking the Tree" (Botrill remix) – 5:59

== Personnel ==
Credits from the Us liner notes.

- Peter Gabriel – vocals, programming, keyboards, synth bass, percussion, harmonica
- David Rhodes – guitar, backing vocals
- Manny Elias – Senegalese shakers
- Richard Blair – programming
- David Bottrill – additional programming
- Adzido Pan African Dance Ensemble – additional percussion loop
- Marilyn McFarlane – vocals

== Charts ==
Chart (1993)	Peak position
Canada Top Singles (RPM)	36
UK Singles (Official Charts)	46
UK Airplay (Music Week)	30
US Alternative Airplay (Billboard)	18
US Mainstream Rock (Billboard)	18

== Release history ==
Region	Date	Format(s)	Label(s)	Ref.
United Kingdom	13 September 1993	7-inch vinyl; CD1; cassette	Real World; Virgin	
United Kingdom	20 September 1993	CD2	Real World; Virgin	
Australia	15 November 1993	CD; cassette	Real World; Virgin	
