= Secret World (song) =

Promotional single by Peter Gabriel

from the album Us
- Released: 1992
- Length: 7:03
- Label: Real World
- Songwriter: Peter Gabriel
- Producers: Peter Gabriel; Daniel Lanois

"Secret World" is the final song on Peter Gabriel's 1992 Us album. It was released as a promotional single and reached the Billboard Album Rock Tracks chart and the Canadian Top Singles Chart. Gabriel used the title for his 1993–94 Secret World Tour, where the song served as the final song of his main set. The song appeared on his Secret World Live album and Secret World concert film; it also served as the subtitle for Gabriel's multimedia CD ROM game Xplora1: Peter Gabriel's Secret World.

== Background ==
Gabriel wrote "Secret World" following the dissolution of his marriage with Jill Gabriel and his breakup with Rosanna Arquette. He said that the song was "about the private world that two people occupy and the private worlds that they occupy as individuals within that space." An early piano-oriented demo of "Secret World" was recorded on 2 February 1991; the lyrics had yet to be finalised by this point.

Instrumentally, the song begins with what music critic Durrell Bowman described as "gentle, rhythmically keyboards and guitars" that transition into a more percussion oriented composition. The song's bridge documents the collapse of Gabriel's romantic relationships through the lyrical metaphor of a crumbling house and features bass runs from Tony Levin. To achieve the percussive bass tones on "Secret World", Levin struck the strings with funk fingers, a set of specialized drumsticks attached to the digits that he developed while touring Gabriel's So album in the 1980s.

At the suggestion of Malcolm Burn, Gabriel added a bridge to "Secret World" later in development. Burn recalled that it was "like pulling teeth to get Peter to try the idea because it meant more lyrics needed to be written." While Gabriel was crafting the bridge, Burn overdubbed some synth cello parts, which were mixed in with a real cello played by Caroline Lavelle. Various musical components were saved onto different formats, including 24-inch tape and digital recording software, including some sequenced parts that ran on SMPTE.

Gabriel invited Rebecca Horn to create the artwork for "Secret World", which was later included in the liner notes for US and exhibited at the London Contemporary Art Fair in 1993. Horn was drawn to the lyrics about railway stations and railways tracks as she had memories associated running away from boarding school as a child to her parents who lived in Milan and Paris, saying "from that period, I have these strange memories of train stations and I always used to dream I could go anywhere in the world." After her first listen to the song, Horn purchased a suitcase from a flea market in Berlin and attached various objects to its interior, including a violin bow, a set of binoculars, and a device resembling a butterfly.

Radio and Records reported that "Secret World" was the third most added song to album-oriented rock stations on its 18 June 1993 publication and that the song debuted at number 42 on its listing. The song accumulated 17 adds the following week, making it the tenth most added song to AOR radio stations. For the 23 July 1993 edition of Radio & Records, the song peaked at number 26 on the AOR chart. Around the same time, it also charted on Billboard's Album Rock Tracks, reaching a peak of number 34.

== Critical reception ==
Upon its release, "Secret World" received mixed reviews from music critics. David Browne of Entertainment Weekly felt that the song was a "climatic, yet drab seven minute ballad" riddled with cliches. Greg Kot from Rolling Stone thought that "Secret World" was one of the songs on Us that resembled "music for Third World airports, little more than exercises in ambient atmosphere." Karla Peterson of the Oxnard Press-Courier said that the "quiet closing chords of the conciliatory Secret World" contributed to the personal and introspective nature of Us.

In a retrospective review, Stephen Thomas Erlewine of AllMusic labeled the song as "quietly anthemic". Ultimate Classic Rock believed that song was more effective in a live setting, singling out particular praise for the version included on Secret World Live. In his book Without Frontiers: The Life and Music of Peter Gabriel, Daryl Easlea said that "Secret World" was "possibly the greatest thing he has ever written and certainly on par with his most notable successes."

== Live performances ==
From 1993 to 2016, "Secret World" was a consistent fixture in Gabriel’s live performances. The song made its debut during his Secret World Tour, where the song's duration was extended beyond the seven minute runtime found on Us. For this tour, the song served as the set-closer. During these performances, images of furniture and faces were projected onto a revolving screen above the main stage, which was equipped with a conveyor belt transporting a set of luggage. At the conclusion of the song, Gabriel opened the largest suitcase positioned above a trapdoor, allowing each musician to step inside and disappear. Gabriel would then grab the suitcase and haul it across the stage's runway.

Gabriel included the song on the setlist of his Growing Up Tour, his first concert tour in ten years. In a concert review for his performance at the Target Center in Minneapolis, Jon Bream of the Star Tribune noted Gabriel's choreography during the song, where he skipped and twirled around the stage with a tambourine and bounced behind his keyboard while a giant balloon descended from above. A live recording from a performance at the Forum di Milano was included on Growing Up: Live. Gabriel also performed the song in 2007 during his Warm Up Tour in Europe, which included a stop in Wiltshire for the 25th anniversary of WOMAD.

In the middle of Gabriel’s orchestral New Blood Tour, "Secret World" was added to the setlist. John Metcalfe, who served as the orchestra conductor and arranger during that tour, recalled that he encountered difficulties in creating a suitable orchestral arrangement for the song in-between tour dates. For his Back to Front Tour, the song returned to its non-orchestral arrangement and featured more conventional instrumentation provided by members of Gabriel's 1986–1987 touring band.

Gabriel performed "Secret World" during his Rock Paper Scissors Tour with Sting in 2016 and last played it in July of that year when the tour concluded in Canada. It did not appear on Gabriel's I/O The Tour in 2023.

== Personnel ==
- Peter Gabriel – lead and backing vocals, keyboards, synth bass, programming, Mexican flute
- David Rhodes – guitar, backing vocals
- Daniel Lanois – guitar, Dobro
- Tony Levin – bass guitar
- Caroline Lavelle – cello
- Malcolm Burn – synth cello
- Manu Katché – electric drums, percussion
- David Bottrill – programming
- Doudou N'Diaye Rose – programming

== Chart performance ==
Chart (1993)	Peak position
Canada Top Singles (RPM)	90
US Mainstream Rock (Billboard)	34
