= Us (Peter Gabriel album) =

Studio album by Peter Gabriel
- Released: 27 September 1992
- Recorded: October 1989 – June 1992
- Studios: Real World, Box, UK; Kingsway, New Orleans, Louisiana; Studio 2000, Dakar
- Genres: Art rock; pop; worldbeat; progressive rock
- Length: 57:48
- Labels: Real World; Geffen
- Producers: Daniel Lanois; Peter Gabriel

Peter Gabriel chronology
Shaking the Tree: Sixteen Golden Greats (1990)	Us (1992)	Peter Gabriel Revisited (1992)

Peter Gabriel studio album chronology
So (1986)	Us (1992)	Up (2002)

Singles from Us
- 1. "Digging in the Dirt" Released: 7 September 1992; 2. "Steam" Released: 4 January 1993; 3. "Blood of Eden" Released: 15 March 1993; 4. "Kiss That Frog" Released: 13 September 1993 (UK); 5. "Come Talk to Me" Released: September 1993 (US)

Us is the sixth studio album by English musician Peter Gabriel, released on 27 September 1992 by Real World Records and Geffen Records. Following the release of his soundtrack album Passion in 1989, Gabriel started work on new material for a new album, his first since So, which became his biggest selling release. Gabriel focused on personal themes on Us, including his divorce in the late 1980s, his subsequent relationship with actress Rosanna Arquette, and the growing distance between him and his first daughter.

Us was promoted with an early form of interactive multimedia software for Macintosh computers entitled Xplora1: Peter Gabriel's Secret World, which featured several music videos from the album. The album was a worldwide chart success, reaching No. 2 in the UK and the US and the top-ten in twelve other countries. Four singles were released: "Digging in the Dirt", "Steam", "Blood of Eden", and "Kiss That Frog", with "Steam" reaching No. 10 in the UK. Gabriel supported the album with his Secret World Tour in 1993 and 1994 which was documented on the Secret World Live album and same-titled concert film, both released in 1994. Us was remastered with the rest of his back catalogue in 2002.

== Background ==
In an interview with New Musical Express published in June 1989, Gabriel mentioned that he intended for his next release after Passion to be either a concept album or two separate releases, with one oriented around "melody and atmosphere" and another with an emphasis on "rhythm and dance". In October 1989, Gabriel started work on songs which would end up on the Us album. During that time, he was concurrently preparing new versions of songs for the 1990 compilation album Shaking the Tree: Sixteen Golden Greats and supervising the editing of 1987 concert footage shot in Greece, which was released in 1990 as the live video album POV.

Through 1991 and into June 1992, he focused on composing and recording the Us album, mainly at his own Real World Studios in Wiltshire, England, with specialised recording sessions held at Kingsway Studios in New Orleans, and Studio 2000 in Dakar. Daniel Lanois co-produced the album with Gabriel, with support from David Bottrill in programming and engineering. The final album ended up being almost 58 minutes long, substantially longer than all his earlier releases which adhered to the 46-minute limit of the analog 12-inch vinyl LP. As a change from So, Lanois agreed to work on a more on-and-off basis with Gabriel as producer; the former did short stints of at least two weeks at a time, balancing commitments with U2's Achtung Baby and solo album For the Beauty of Wynona. That way, Lanois felt there was more renewed excitement and energy in the studio, which showed in the songs more than in a long drawn-out stay. While less involved in the more detailed production work (including mixing), Gabriel noted that Lanois had greater influence in the musical areas of the album, pushing him more musically, lyrically and as a performer in the studio.

Typically, Gabriel started off songs in the studio with a rhythm pattern – usually a loop, a programmed drum pattern or both combined. To the drum pattern, he would improvise chords on piano and keyboards and ad-lib some vocals, with the performance captured onto DAT for reference. Gabriel would also listen back to the captured performances, to which he would play along on his keyboard rig and inspire further ideas. Like on So, Lanois and David Rhodes occasionally played guitar alongside Gabriel during these early stages. Gradually, Gabriel arrived at a rough structure of the given song, and from there start involving other musicians.

Gabriel held two sets of full-band sessions with his studio line-up, including Lanois, Rhodes, bassist Tony Levin and drummer Manu Katché. For the first sessions in October 1990, Katché had an African percussion kit setup with Gabriel's old bass drum from his time in Genesis, whereas he used a standard drum kit for the second set of sessions the following year. The musicians were given freedom to develop their own parts within the song structure. Subsequently, Gabriel continued to refine the songs in the studio, tweaking the song structure, melodies and lyrics until satisfied. Typically, Botrill would assemble a song structure on tape via transferring elements from several multitrack tapes; this process was repeated when Gabriel came up with newer ideas that required them to restructure the composition. Over the course of the two-and-a-half-year recording sessions for Us, each song usually went through three to four iterations before Gabriel finalised their structure.

Gabriel had met Sinéad O'Connor in October 1990 at the Amnesty International human rights benefit concert held in Santiago, Chile. Gabriel invited O'Connor to Real World Studios to record vocals for "Come Talk to Me" and "Blood of Eden".

== Songs ==
The album opens with "Come Talk to Me", a song that Gabriel had written about a rift in communication between him and one of his daughters. Musically, the song was developed around a groove played by Doudou N'Diaye Rose during a 1980 recording session in Senegal. The song incorporates the use of bagpipes, a duduk, and a Russian choir. "Love to Be Loved" emerged from the lines "Liked to be liked / Need to be needed / Want to be wanted and loved to be loved", which Gabriel had written down a few years prior to the release of Us. According to David Bottrill, who served as one of the audio engineers for the album, Gabriel sang his lead vocal parts "about 40 times", with the final product being a composite of multiple takes.

"Blood of Eden" uses biblical imagery to describe the failure of a romantic relationship. Lanois was initially dissatisfied with the song, which ultimately went through multiple different iterations before they settled on a simpler groove than earlier versions of the track, which Gabriel said "verged on sounding trite". "Steam" was derived from a lyrical idea from Gabriel's third self-titled solo album that he had initially abandoned and re-worked into the song "And Through the Wire". He wrote "Steam" about a relationship with a woman who "knows everything about everything" other than herself, and a man who is only knowledgeable about her.

"Only Us" begins and ends with vocals from Ayub Ogada, a Kenyan singer based in London who Gabriel described as having "this very sweet, soft and quite rhythmic way of singing". Further instrumental textures were provided by L. Shankar on violin and Kudsi Erguner on a ney flute. The guitars on "Only Us" were played by Rhodes and Bill Dillon, the latter of whom recorded his parts in New Orleans using Electro-Harmonix delay pedals. "Washing of the Water" features a horn arrangement that was recorded at Lanois' studio in New Orleans. Gabriel described "Washing of the Water" as a love song with a "spiritual reference". He remembered that he anguished over the song's groove and nearly decided to abandon the drums that Manu Katché had recorded. Gabriel thought that the drums carried the quality of "a guy in a hotel, [playing] in a bar band" with a cabaret feel. He ultimately decided that the drums properly suited the song, believing that they had a "nice poignant, slap-dash quality".

"Digging in the Dirt" originated from a groove originally found on "Zaar", a song from Gabriel's Passion album. When writing the lyrics for "Digging in the Dirt", Gabriel took inspiration from literary works about individuals who had committed murders and the experiences of incarcerated people on death row. Reflecting on this research, Gabriel concluded that the subject matter resulted in him assessing his own emotions, which prompted him to write the song. He commented that "there are two threads interwoven in the song – the killer, and my own personal history". "Fourteen Black Paintings" was first demonstrated to John Paul Jones when considering material for inclusion at the Artfutura festival. After Jones worked on the song, Gabriel decided to complete it for Us. The title was inspired by a visit that Gabriel made to the Rothko Chapel in Texas, which contained fourteen black paintings created by Mark Rothko.

"Kiss That Frog" was built around a groove that had been developed for Gabriel's 1985 Birdy soundtrack album. He then paired the instrumental track with some lyrics that had been inspired by the book The Uses of Enchantment, a book by Bruno Bettelheim, that analyses various fairy tales from different psychological points of view. The Frog Prince was one of the fairy tales that Bettelheim discussed in The Uses of Enchantment, which prompted Gabriel to reason that the frog in the story had served as a metaphor for "the fear and horror aspects of first sexual encounters", saying that the story "served as a very good analogy for an introduction to sexuality." The album concludes with "Secret World", which Gabriel described as encompassing "both the private world that two people occupy and the private worlds they occupy as individuals within that space." "Secret World" also shares the same sampled Senegalese groove used on "Come Talk to Me", with Gabriel saying that the two were "both journey tracks" and "personal reflections".

== Release ==
When assembling the liner notes, Gabriel decided to commission different artists to create accompanying visuals for each song on the album. To promote Us, Virgin Records launched a marketing campaign using these commissioned pieces of artwork. The artwork was also showcased at the Art 93 London Contemporary Art Fair. Virgin Records also promoted the album in the UK with a £250,000 campaign consisting of television advertisements, press advertising, window and in-store displays, and what Music Week described as a "nationwide teaser and answer campaign" through various posters.

In the United States, Geffen Records handled the distribution of Us. They anticipated that the initial shipment of Us would comprise 250,000 compact discs and 150,000 cassettes. Similar to Gabriel's previous release, Shaking the Tree: Sixteen Golden Greats, Gabriel decided to forgo longbox packaging in favour of jewel cases. Certain retailers, including Kemp Mill Music, who had limited the stocking of Shaking the Tree: Sixteen Golden Greats due to their belief that the jewel box packaging was not retail-friendly, opted to carry Us at their stores unabated. Billboard reported that both Kemp Mill Music and Russell Solomon of Tower Records had agreed to treat Us as a "normal release" no differently than albums packaged in longboxes. Geffen Records provided retailers a seven percent discount on initial purchases of Us rather than the five percent rate usually offered. Geffen Records also launched an advertising campaign for Us, where Gabriel promoted the album through the press, radio, retail outlets, and an appearance on the MTV Video Music Awards.

Us entered the US Billboard 200 at No. 2, with first-week sales of 125,000 units. It became Gabriel's highest debut on that chart to date, beating out his 1986 album So, which entered the listing at No. 35. Certain retailers across the country, including Strawberries Inc. and Harmony House, reported that Us was the top selling album in their stores; Us was among the top five best-selling albums at Camelot Music during its opening week. In the United Kingdom, Us was held off the top spot by Automatic for the People by R.E.M..

== Reception ==
Professional ratings
Review scores
Source	Rating
AllMusic	3/5 stars
Chicago Sun-Times	3/4 stars
Chicago Tribune	3/4 stars
Entertainment Weekly	C+
Los Angeles Times	3.5/4 stars
NME	5/10
Q	5/5 stars
Record Collector	4/5 stars
Rolling Stone	3/5 stars
The Village Voice	B−

Us received generally positive reviews from critics. Billboard thought that Gabriel was positioned to "repeat the success of his So with his release of Us. Writing for the Chicago Tribune, Greg Kot stated the album's "opaque melodies and exotic rhythms reward the patient listener, but not without a struggle." The Los Angeles Times awarded the album three-and-a-half stars out of four and praised Gabriel's ability to integrate elements of world music into an art rock style.

Music Week listed the album as their pick of the week, calling it a "stunning album of great cohesion" that represented "an important milestone" for Gabriel. Music & Media felt that Us aligned with the "globally determined" outlook of Gabriel and his Real World label. Writing for Select magazine, Dave Morrison wrote that world music influences were "seamlessly integrated into the textures of Us" and that it "finds Gabriel pushing further into his imaginative soundworld." In a combined review of So, Us, and Up, Record Collector gave the album four stars out of five and called it an "underrated, rewarding listen".

== Track listing ==
All tracks are written by Peter Gabriel.

Us track listing
No.	Title	Length
1.	"Come Talk to Me" (with Sinéad O'Connor)	7:06
2.	"Love to Be Loved"	5:18
3.	"Blood of Eden" (with Sinéad O'Connor)	6:38
4.	"Steam"	6:03
5.	"Only Us"	6:30
6.	"Washing of the Water"	3:52
7.	"Digging in the Dirt"	5:18
8.	"Fourteen Black Paintings"	4:38
9.	"Kiss That Frog"	5:20
10.	"Secret World"	7:03

== Personnel ==
=== Musicians ===
- Peter Gabriel – vocals (all tracks), keyboards (all tracks), triangle (track 1), programming (tracks 1, 2, 7–10), synth bass (tracks 1, 3, 7, 9, 10), percussion (tracks 2, 4, 9), valiha (track 2), horn arrangement (track 4), harmonica (track 9), Mexican flute (track 10)
- Tony Levin – bass guitar (tracks 1–7 and 10)
- David Rhodes – guitar (tracks 1, 2, 4, 5, 7–10), twelve-string guitar (track 3), solo guitar (track 4)
- Manu Katché – drums (tracks 1, 6, 7), electronic drums (tracks 2, 4, 5, 10), percussion (track 10)
- The Babacar Faye Drummers – sabar drums (tracks 1 and 4)
- Doudou N'Diaye Rose – programming (tracks 1 and 10)
- David Bottrill – programming (tracks 1–4, 7, 10), additional programming (tracks 5 and 9), studio engineer
- Chris Ormston – bagpipes (track 1)
- Daniel Lanois – shaker (track 1), guitar (tracks 1, 10), additional vocals (track 1), hi-hat (track 3), vocals (track 3), horn arrangements (track 4), Dobro (tracks 8, 10)
- Richard Blair – additional verse keyboards (track 1), programming (tracks 4, 5, 7, 9), additional programming (track 3)
- Levon Minassian – duduk (tracks 1, 3, 8)
- Sinéad O'Connor – vocals (tracks 1, 3)
- Dmitri Pokrovsky Ensemble – vocals (track 1)
- Hossam Ramzy – tabla (track 2), surdo (track 7)
- Daryl Johnson – hand drum (track 2)
- William Orbit – programming (track 2), additional programming (track 5)
- Bill Dillon – guitar (tracks 2, 5)
- Mark Rivera – alto saxophone (tracks 4, 6)
- Brian Eno – additional keyboards (track 2)
- L. Shankar – violin (tracks 2, 3, 5, 8)
- Caroline Lavelle – cello (tracks 2, 6, 10), string arrangement (track 2)
- Wil Malone – string arrangement (track 2, 6)
- Jonny Dollar – string arrangement (track 2, 6)
- Richard Evans – additional engineering (track 2), mix engineer (track 8), mandolin (track 8)
- Gus Isidore – bridge guitar (track 3)
- Richard Chappell – bridge section mix (track 3)
- Leo Nocentelli – guitar (tracks 4, 7)
- Tim Green – tenor saxophone (tracks 4, 6)
- Reggie Houston – baritone saxophone (tracks 4, 6)
- Renard Poché – trombone (tracks 4, 6)
- Wayne Jackson – trumpet (track 4), cornet (track 6)
- Kudsi Erguner – ney flute (track 5), shaker (track 4)
- Ayub Ogada – vocals (track 5, 7)
- Malcolm Burn – horn arrangement (track 6), additional synth cello (track 10), additional production ideas (track 10)
- Mark Howard – horns recording (track 6)
- Babacar Faye – djembe (tracks 7, 8)
- Assane Thiam – tama (track 7), talking drum (track 8)
- Peter Hammill – vocals (track 7)
- Richard Macphail – vocals (track 7)
- John Paul Jones – surdo (track 8), bass (track 8), keyboards (track 8)
- Adzido Pan African Dance Ensemble – additional percussion loop (track 9)
- Manny Elias – Senegalese shakers (track 9)
- Marilyn McFarlane – vocals (track 9)

=== Technical support ===
- Mike Large
- Sue Coulson
- Brian Gray

== Charts ==
=== Weekly charts ===
Weekly chart performance for Us
Chart (1992–1993)	Peak position
Australian Albums (ARIA)	3
Austrian Albums (Ö3 Austria)	10
Belgian Albums (BEA)	2
Canada Top Albums/CDs (RPM)	4
Danish Albums (Hitlisten)	7
Dutch Albums (Album Top 100)	8
European Albums (IFPI)	1
Finnish Albums (Suomen virallinen lista)	1
French Albums (SNEP)	2
German Albums (Offizielle Top 100)	1
Greek Albums (IFPI)	2
Italian Albums (AFI)	6
Japanese Albums (Oricon)	9
New Zealand Albums (RMNZ)	6
Norwegian Albums (VG-lista)	7
Portuguese Albums (AFP)	2
Spanish Albums (AFYVE)	7
Swedish Albums (Sverigetopplistan)	2
Swiss Albums (Schweizer Hitparade)	2
UK Albums (Official Charts)	2
US Billboard 200	2

=== Year-end charts ===
1992 year-end chart performance for Us
Chart (1992)	Position
Austrian Albums (Ö3 Austria)	71
Canada Top Albums/CDs (RPM)	30
European Albums (IFPI)	31
German Albums (Offizielle Top 100)	54
Italian Albums (AFI)	42
Japanese Albums (Oricon)	67
Norwegian Albums (VG-lista)	71
Spanish Albums (AFYVE)	59
Swiss Albums (Swiss Hitparade)	47
UK Albums (OCC)	79

1993 year-end chart performance for Us
Chart (1993)	Position
Austrian Albums (Ö3 Austria)	166
Canada Top Albums/CDs (RPM)	70
German Albums (Offizielle Top 100)	70
Japanese Albums (Oricon)	92
Spanish Albums (AFYVE)	87
Swiss Albums (Swiss Hitparade)	94
UK Albums (OCC)	61
US Billboard 200	81

== Certifications and sales ==
Certifications and sales for Us
Region	Certification	Certified units/sales
Argentina (CAPIF)	Gold	30,000^{^}
Australia (ARIA)	3× Platinum	210,000^{^}
Brazil	—	200,000
Canada (Music Canada)	2× Platinum	200,000^{^}
France (SNEP)	2× Gold	200,000^{*}
Germany (BVMI)	Platinum	500,000^{^}
Italy (FIMI)	3× Platinum	300,000^{*}
New Zealand (RMNZ)	Gold	7,500^{^}
Spain (Promusicae)	Gold	50,000^{^}
Sweden (GLF)	Gold	50,000^{^}
United Kingdom (BPI)	Platinum	300,000^{^}
United States (RIAA)	Platinum	1,600,000
^{*} Sales figures based on certification alone.^{^} Shipments figures based on certification alone.
