= In Your Eyes (Peter Gabriel song) =

1986 single by Peter Gabriel

- 1986 12-inch maxi-single picture sleeve

Single by Peter Gabriel

from the album So
- Released: August 1986 (US)
- Recorded: 1985
- Length: 5:23 (album version); 6:12 (remixed 7" version); 4:53 (7" Special mix; 1989 re-release); 7:10 (12" Special mix)
- Label: Geffen
- Songwriter: Peter Gabriel
- Producers: Peter Gabriel; Bill Laswell; Daniel Lanois

Peter Gabriel singles chronology
"Don't Give Up" (1986)	"In Your Eyes" (1986)	"Big Time" (1987)

Music video
- "In Your Eyes" on YouTube

"In Your Eyes" is a song by the English rock musician Peter Gabriel from his fifth solo studio album So (1986). It features Youssou N'Dour singing a part at the end of the song translated into his native Wolof. Gabriel's lyrics were inspired by an African tradition of ambiguity in song between romantic love and love of God.

"In Your Eyes" was not released as a single in the UK but was the second single from So in the US, achieving strong radio airplay and regular MTV rotation. It reached number 1 on the US Billboard Mainstream Rock Tracks on 13 September 1986 and peaked at number 26 on the Billboard Hot 100 in November. Gabriel released two extended versions of the song as a 12" vinyl single in the US. The first ran 6:15 and was the single version. The second, "Special" mix, ran 7:14 and was the B-side. In Australia, "In Your Eyes" peaked at number 97 in November 1986.

The song was featured in the 1989 film Say Anything... starring John Cusack and Ione Skye. It closed Gabriel's setlists during the Secret World Tour and is the final track on the 1994 Secret World Live album, where it is over 11 minutes long and includes the extra lyrics from the Special Mix and solos by the other singers and players. It was included on the US version of his 2003 compilation Hit, but not the European or Japanese versions.

In 2005, the song gave Gabriel his first gold single, certified in the US by the RIAA.

== Background ==
"In Your Eyes" was restructured on several occasions over the course of the recording sessions and required six reels of tape to piece together. The song originally had a verse that Gabriel described as "groove-based", but he deemed this part as unsuitable and discarded it. He instead replaced this verse with some parts from a different song titled "Sagrada", which Gabriel had also developed for the So album. "Sagrada" was inspired by a trip to a cathedral in Barcelona, Spain. Gabriel based the lyrics on the Sagrada Família in Barcelona and the construction of the Winchester Mystery House in San Jose, California. He performed "Sagrada" live on a few occasions but left the composition unfinished. Gabriel scrapped "Sagrada" from the So album early in development, and the vocal melody and chord changes were later transferred over to "In Your Eyes".

Gabriel characterised "In Your Eyes" as a love song that carried two different meanings: the devotion to a divine being and romantic relationship. He explained the lyrical content to Armando Gallo in a 1986 interview, saying that "there is a tradition in Africa that intrigued me; that of writing love songs so they can be heard as love God or the love between men and women. None seems to do that in Western lyrics so I thought I would try mixing images. The eyes are clearly a focus point for the soul." Daniel Lanois, who served as a producer for the So album, said that Gabriel "had this idea that by looking into someone's eyes, you would see, quite specifically in the lyric, the doorway to a thousand churches...you can stand in a church and it might have a gilded ceiling and statues, but you might speak to God by looking at someone's eyes who loves you, or you love them."

When determining the track order for So, Gabriel wanted "In Your Eyes" to be the final track, but its prominent bassline meant it had to be placed earlier on the vinyl edition where the phonograph stylus had more room to vibrate. This restriction was no longer an issue for later CD releases, allowing the track to be placed as originally intended. Gabriel refused to play "In Your Eyes" for any record company executives until he made the song more experimental.

== Recording ==
The song incorporates vocals from Senegalese singer Youssou N'Dour. Gabriel invited N'Dour to his Ashcombe House home for lunch and played him a demo of "In Your Eyes" with the intention of having N'Dour record some vocals in English. N'Dour translated certain lines of the song into his native Wolof language and improvised his parts. Jenny Cathcart, a BBC researcher who acted as N'Dour's interpreter, recalled that "everybody was incredibly uplifted that afternoon. Youssou didn't even know he was going to do this; it was as if it was meant to be". Jerry Marotta, one of the two drummers who played on "In Your Eyes", recalled that N'Dour was several hours late for the recording session and recorded his vocal take in thirty minutes.

Despite not being credited with the instrument in the album's liner notes, Daniel Lanois said in a 2023 interview with Rick Beato that he played an acoustic twelve-string guitar on the song's chorus. Lanois was not impressed with the quality of the guitar and believed that it was "not a very nice instrument". He further stated that the guitar part provided "a support role that a drum might play" and that "the support was such that it was high frequency, harmonic, high-speed component underneath a relatively low slow phrasing from the vocal." In a 2026 interview, David Rhodes said that he played the song's twelve-string guitar parts on an old Shergold, saying that "it was a dog to play, but it had a nice sound." In the liner notes for So, all of the guitar parts were credited to Rhodes.

The song's instrumentation was originally recorded to a rhythm box. Manu Katché was brought into the recording studio to play drums on "In Your Eyes", which was one of the first songs he worked on with Gabriel along with "Don't Give Up". Both Katché and Marotta played drums on the song, with Katché also overdubbing a talking drum and additional percussion. Some of the drums were reinforced by a surdo sample, which was aligned with some of the kick drum hits. In a 1987 interview with Modern Drummer, Katché said that he played the surdo on "In Your Eyes"; the instrument was muffled with a cloth to prevent it from excessively resonating. Lanois characterized the drums as having "an old carnival beat" that "keeps the zip in the step going and keeps you interested in the lyrics". Katché recalled that he struggled to find a proper approach to the song for the drums, so Gabriel demonstrated what he wanted by performing a dance near his drum kit.

He was awkward, because he couldn't really dance. But if Peter, who didn't know me very well—because it was only the third or fourth day in the studio—tried to help me like that, then there was a message there. With that dance, that was [what] he wanted me to feel.

The arpeggiated guitar part during the chorus was a composite of two different tracks that were layered over chordal accompaniment from a piano and synthesiser. Rhodes, who played the song's electric guitars, noted his preference for having "a lack of definition" between the synthesizers and guitars.

== Release ==
"In Your Eyes" first received airplay on album oriented rock (AOR) radio stations in the United States, with Radio & Records reporting it as the fifth most added song to AOR stations for the week of 23 May 1986. The following week, it debuted in the top 60 AOR Tracks chart along with Gabriel's song "Red Rain".

For the publication dated 29 August 1986, "In Your Eyes" was included on the playlists of 150 reporting AOR stations, making it the number one song in that format. That same week, the song also received 41 adds on contemporary hit radio stations, with a total of 43 percent of radio stations in that format playing the song.

In early September, "In Your Eyes" reached the number one position on Billboard's Album Rock chart. Around the same time, "In Your Eyes" began to receive further airplay on contemporary hit radio stations, debuting at number 40 of the Radio & Records airplay chart with 62 percent of those respective stations playing the song. In the middle of October, the song reached number 19 on the Radio & Records Contemporary Hit Radio Airplay chart and number 26 on the Billboard Hot 100.

== Critical reception ==
Cash Box called it a "sweet and tuneful ballad" and praised Gabriel's "plaintive voice and sensational spacious production work." Billboard called it a "dreamily textured mood piece." Rolling Stone thought that "In Your Eyes" was "perhaps the closest thing to a conventional love ballad Gabriel has ever recorded."

Writing for AllMusic, Stewart Mason called "In Your Eyes" the "finest pure love song Gabriel had ever written and one of his best songs." MusicHound has described the song as being flavoured by worldbeat influences.

== Say Anything... ==
The song was used twice in the 1989 film Say Anything..., as well as its trailer. A famous scene from the film occurs when broken-hearted Lloyd Dobler (John Cusack) serenades his ex-girlfriend, Diane Court (Ione Skye), outside her bedroom window by holding a boombox up above his head and playing the song for her. Repopularized by its usage in the film, the song reentered the Billboard Hot 100, reaching number 41. This release was shorter, with a length of 4:53.

Crowe says that Rosanna Arquette, who is believed to be the inspiration for the song, encouraged Peter Gabriel to consider allowing the film to use the song. Gabriel asked to see Crowe's film and Crowe asked the production company to send Gabriel a rough cut. Gabriel rejected the use of his song, telling Crowe that he was uneasy about the overdose of the main character at the end; the studio had erroneously sent Gabriel the film Wired instead. He later approved the use of "In Your Eyes" upon seeing Say Anything.... The edited film version was included on the Rated PG album, a 2019 compilation containing some of Gabriel's songs that were used in film soundtracks.

In a September 2012 interview with Rolling Stone, discussing the 25th anniversary of So, Gabriel commented on the cultural impact of the scene, "It definitely gave [the song] a second life, because now it's so often parodied in comedy shows and it is one of the modern day Romeo and Juliet balcony clichés. I've talked to John Cusack about that. We're sort of trapped together in a minuscule moment of contemporary culture." In October 2012, as Gabriel played the first few bars of the song during a performance at the Hollywood Bowl, Cusack walked onto the stage, handed him a boombox and took a bow, before quickly walking off again. Say Anything... director Cameron Crowe was also present at the concert and later tweeted "Peter Gabriel and John Cusack on stage together at the Hollywood Bowl tonight. Won't forget that... ever."

== Personnel ==
- Manu Katché – drums, talking drum, percussion
- Jerry Marotta – additional drums
- Larry Klein – bass guitar
- Tony Levin – bass guitar
- Daniel Lanois – acoustic 12-string guitar
- David Rhodes – electric guitar, backing vocals
- Peter Gabriel – lead and backing vocals, Fairlight CMI, piano, synthesizer
- Richard Tee – piano
- Youssou N'Dour – guest vocals
- Michael Been – backing vocals
- Jim Kerr – backing vocals
- Ronnie Bright – bass vocals
- Kevin Killen – mixing

== Charts ==
=== Weekly charts ===
Chart (1986–1987)	Peak position
Australia (Kent Music Report)	97
Canada Top Singles (RPM)	29
New Zealand (Recorded Music NZ)	50
US Billboard Hot 100	26
US Mainstream Rock (Billboard)	1

== Certifications ==
Certifications
Region	Certification	Certified units/sales
New Zealand (RMNZ)	Gold	15,000^{‡}
United States (RIAA)	Gold	500,000^{^}
^{^} Shipments figures based on certification alone.^{‡} Sales+streaming figures based on certification alone.

== Performances ==
On theThis Way Up Tour tour (1986–1987), Gabriel performed "In Your Eyes" as a vocal duet with Youssou N'Dour, mainly during his North American concerts. Starting with this tour, Gabriel wanted to extend the ending, so David Sancious added a piano solo that transitioned into the final chorus. Gabriel included the song as an encore for his 1993–1994 Secret World Tour, with these renditions featuring vocal contributions from Papa Wemba. Gabriel had performed the song on Saturday Night Live a few days prior to the conclusion of his Secret World Tour.

For live renditions of "In Your Eyes", Manu Katché prepared the programmed drums with a Roland Octapad and an Akai MPC. He also triggered some sampled sounds using contact microphones placed on his tom-toms. During Gabriel's tour promoting his Live Blood album, Gabriel performed the song with the Uzbek singer-songwriter Sevara Nazarkhan.

On 10 April 2014, Gabriel performed the song with an extended vocal duet with N'Dour as Gabriel was being inducted into the Rock and Roll Hall of Fame at the Barclays Center in Brooklyn, New York.
