= Come Talk to Me =

1992 single by Peter Gabriel

Single by Peter Gabriel

from the album Us
- B-side: "A Different Drum"
- Released: 1993 (US)
- Length: 7:03 (album version); 4:40 (Clearmountain Mix Edit)
- Label: Real World
- Songwriter: Peter Gabriel
- Producers: Daniel Lanois; Peter Gabriel

"Come Talk to Me" is the opening song from English rock musician Peter Gabriel's sixth album, Us (1992). It was written by Gabriel and recorded as a duet with Irish singer Sinéad O'Connor. The song was released as a single in the US and also received a music video directed by Matt Mahurin. The music video also included the involvement of Michael Coulson, who served as the creative director from Real World, and British visual artist Nichola Bruce.

== Background ==
Gabriel wrote "Come Talk to Me" about the breakdown in communication between him and one of his daughters, who believed that her father had become distant following his divorce with Jill Gabriel. He noted that his daughter struggled to express her grievances pertaining to their strained relationship and characterized the song as "a cry from the heart."

Footage of Gabriel and producer Daniel Lanois conducting a run-through of "Come Talk to Me" was featured during a UK Channel 4 documentary that aired in 1993. In a 1992 interview, Lanois said that Gabriel suggested that the two of them along with David Rhodes "take the backbone rhythm and play and sing on top of it as a three piece band". Lanois characterised "Come Talk to Me" as a "simple song with quite a huge production" and a "little message to one person that can be interpreted as a universal message."

The song begins with distorted guitar chords, which later gives way to African-style drums, bagpipes, and synthesisers. The African drums were taken from a Senegalese groove recorded by master drummer Doudou N'Diaye Rose in 1980. Rose and Gabriel chopped up the drum groove and augmented it with other percussive beats, including a shaker played by Daniel Lanois. Gabriel experimented extensively with finding suitable sonic textures and gravitated towards the bagpipes due to their "gutsy and primal" quality. Other additions to the song included a duduk solo played by Levon Minassian and vocals from the Russian folk group Dmitri Pokrovsky Ensemble.

The additional vocals during the chorus were sung by Sinéad O'Connor, who Gabriel admired and had a brief romantic relationship with. O'Connor and Gabriel first met at a 1990 Amnesty International concert in Chile, where they performed "Don't Give Up" together. On his website, Gabriel said that it was "a powerful thing" to have O'Connor appear on "Come Talk to Me", adding that he was pleased with her performance.

In an interview with The Washington Post, Gabriel stated that "Come Talk to Me" carried more significance to him than "Kiss That Frog", a song from Us that he dismissed as a "throwaway". "But it's important for me to have both sides present – different moods, different feelings." He also said that "Come Talk to Me", along with "Secret World" were both "journey tracks" and "personal reflections". "Come Talk to Me" received airplay on contemporary hit radio stations in 1993, with 25 percent of reporting stations within that format playing the song for the week dated 27 August 1993 according to Radio & Records.

== Artwork ==
The cover art was created by Scottish sculptor David Mach, who created an image of Gabriel's screaming face. Using the collage medium, Mach created a 1320mm x 1310mm x 120mm image of Gabriel with his mouth open and used postcards for the green background. Mach contorted and processed Gabriel's face into a "nightmarish, suppressed scream" and decided that the image would be a good fit for the song, rationalising that Gabriel "was a very good screamer". He also said that the warped image of Gabriel was a representation of "the distortion of language", explaining that similar to a game of Chinese whispers, the original intent of a verbally communicated message can be misinterpreted by the person on the receiving end.

== Critical reception ==
Richard Harrington of The Washington Post commented that the song "explores barriers to communication and the need to 'unlock the misery'", adding that "despite its somber tone, it's a typically elastic Gabriel concoction built on fuzzy guitars, African drum loops, a Russian folk chorale, bagpipes, doudouks [sic] and a Sinead O'Connor harmony." Daryll Easlea, a Peter Gabriel biographer, noted the duration of the song's fade-out, saying that it created the impression of a conversation "continuing in a permanent loop." David Browne of Entertainment Weekly described the lyrics as "vague enough to apply to romantic liaisons", while also acknowledging that Gabriel's original intention of writing the song for one of his daughters was also applicable.

Greg Kot of Rolling Stone thought that some of the "artsy" lyrics detracted from the "otherwise beautiful 'Come Talk to Me'". The Orlando Sentinel praised "Come Talk to Me" as "an enticing song, stunningly arranged" with "bagpipes, driving polyrhythms, vocal harmonies by Sinead O'Connor, the Dimitri Pokrovsky Ensemble and various exotic instruments [that] combine to make this plea for communication almost as moving as Gabriel's earlier masterpieces, Biko and San Jacinto". Similar to Kot's commentary, the publication was also critical of some of the song's "pretentious lines".

== Live performances ==
"Come Talk to Me" was the concert opener on his 1993–94 Secret World Tour. Gabriel began the performance by singing in an illuminated telephone booth that emerged from a trapdoor. Depending on the leg of the tour, either Joy Askew, O'Connor, or Paula Cole would sing additional vocals on "Come Talk to Me". They performed on a circular stage that led to a square stage, which were connected by a narrow runway with a conveyor belt. After the first few verses, Gabriel would emerge from the telephone booth and walk onto the conveyor belt while holding a handset connected to a long wire, which tugged him around as he attempted to advance further away from the telephone booth and toward the circular stage. A micro-camera was also attached to Gabriel's head, which projected images of his face on a video screen.

At the 2001 WOMAD musical festival, Gabriel performed "Come Talk to Me" as a duet with his daughter Melanie. Melanie later reprised this role for the 2004 Still Growing Up tour, where the song appeared as an encore. An acoustic rendition of the song was later performed on the 2012–2014 Back to Front Tour and also appeared on the Back to Front: Live in London album recorded at The O2 Arena in London.

== Personnel ==
Credits from the Us liner notes.

- Peter Gabriel – vocals, programming, keyboards, synth bass, triangle
- David Rhodes – guitar, backing vocals
- Tony Levin – bass guitar
- Richard Blair – additional verse keyboards
- Manu Katché – drums
- The Babacar Faye Drummers – sabar drums
- Daniel Lanois – shaker, guitar, additional vocals
- Chris Ormston – bagpipes
- Levon Minassian – duduk
- Doudou N'Diaye Rose – programming
- David Bottrill – programming
- Sinéad O'Connor – vocals
- Dmitri Pokrovsky Ensemble – vocals
