= Red Rain (song) =

1987 single by Peter Gabriel

Single by Peter Gabriel

from the album So
- Released: 29 June 1987
- Recorded: 1985
- Genre: Rock
- Length: 5:39 (album version); 4:02 (US promo edit)
- Label: Geffen
- Songwriter: Peter Gabriel
- Producers: Peter Gabriel; Daniel Lanois

Peter Gabriel singles chronology
"Big Time" (1987)	"Red Rain" (1987)	"Biko Live/No More Apartheid" (1987)

Music video
- "Red Rain" on YouTube

"Red Rain" is the first track on English rock musician Peter Gabriel's fifth solo studio album So (1986). The song was released as a promotional single in 1986 and received a commercial release the following year, during which it charted in various countries throughout Europe.

Since its release, "Red Rain" has appeared on some of Gabriel's compilation albums, including Shaking the Tree: Sixteen Golden Greats. Gabriel has also performed the song on several of his live tours, beginning with the This Way Up Tour.

"Red Rain" was included on a Greenpeace benefit album released by Geffen Records titled Rainbow Warriors, which contained over 25 tracks from artists including INXS, Sting, and Grateful Dead.

== Background ==
"Red Rain" is a combination of several inspirations. The lyrics directly reference a recurring dream Gabriel was having where he swam in his backyard pool drinking cold red wine. Another version of the dream had bottles in the shape of people falling from a cliff. In it, a stream of red liquid would seep out of the people-shaped bottles as they smashed with impact onto the ground, and was usually followed by a torrential downpour of the same red liquid.

Earlier in his solo career, Gabriel had an idea for a movie he referred to as Mozo. In it, villagers were punished for their sins with a blood-red rain. "Red Rain" was to be the theme song. This idea was eventually scrapped, although there was a mention of Mozo in the song "On the Air" in Peter Gabriel (1978). "Down the Dolce Vita", "Here Comes the Flood", and "Exposure" reference the Mozo story, as well.

Strongly percussive in nature, the song features two notable American drummers: Stewart Copeland from the Police played the hi-hat for the rain-like background sound and was requested by Gabriel due to his mastery of the instrument. The rest of the drumming was provided by Gabriel's regular drummer Jerry Marotta, who recorded eight different drum takes for producer Daniel Lanois to choose from. According to Copeland, he recorded his parts at Gabriel's Ashcombe House studio along to a series of riffs that lacked any lyrics or solidified chord progressions. He had conducted the sessions with Tony Levin on bass along with some other session musicians, after which Gabriel took some of Copeland's parts and incorporated them into So. He mentioned that he did not hear any of his parts within the context of So until the album was released.

He had Tony Levin in there on bass and a couple of other musicians, and we were just kind of screwing around...All I heard was just us doing riffs and grooves, which he cut up and later added lyrics to and wrote songs around... Which tracks did I play on that album? I'm not even sure! Am I even in there? Peter says so. Ok, I'll take the credit. I've got a platinum album from it, so I guess it was my hi-hat.

— Stewart Copeland

== Release ==
In the United States, "Red Rain" was initially only released as a promotional single. By June 1986, the song had been added to 60 percent of album oriented rock radio stations in the United States according to Radio & Records. The song reached number three on Billboard magazine's Mainstream Rock chart, where it stayed for three weeks between July and August.

A year later, in June 1987, the song was released as a commercial single in parts of Europe, Australia and the United States. Virgin Records handled the distribution of the single in the UK, where all variants were appended with a track titled "Ga Ga", an alternate instrumental recording of a Gabriel track titled "I Go Swimming". The twelve-inch single also included "Walk Through the Fire". The song peaked at 46 in the UK singles chart after entering the chart in July of that year.

A live version taken from Gabriel's Secret World Live album also charted in the UK and North America in 1994. An orchestral rendition of the song was also included on Gabriel's 2011 album New Blood.

== Critical reception ==
Gabriel's biographer Daryl Easlea wrote that the song was "a brooding opening to the album" which reflected "two very current Eighties obsessions: AIDS and nuclear fallout". Jon Parles of The New York Times identified "Red Rain" as one of the bleakest songs on the album. In his review of So, Tim Holmes of Rolling Stone thought that the song's descending melody acted as a soothing metaphor for an apocalyptic image." Stephen Thomas Erlewine has described it as "a stately anthem popular on album rock radio". Wyndham Wallace of The Quietus characterised the song as a "stirring opener" that "echo[ed] the sound of a downpour" with "intense" instrumental accompaniment.

== Live performances ==
"Red Rain" made its live debut during the This Way Up Tour, a 1986–1987 concert tour promoting Gabriel's So album. During these performances, the stage lights were calibrated to create the illusion of rain. Discussing Manu Katché's drumming on these renditions, Connie Fisher of Modern Drummer characterised his playing as "profoundly passionate - a majestic march that builds with symphonic intensity", adding that he "swoop[ed]" between the components of his drum kit "like a jungle bird." For the keyboards, Gabriel played a piano part with a chorus and delay while David Sancious played string pads and what he described as a "special little synthy sound". One of the recordings from this tour was included on the Live in Athens 1987 disc, which was originally found on Gabriel's 2012 deluxe edition of So. Gabriel also included the song in the setlist of his Secret World Tour, Growing Up Tour, and Back to Front Tour.

== Track listing ==
1. "Red Rain"
2. "In Your Eyes" (special mix) [only on 12"]
3. "Ga-Ga"

"Ga-Ga" is an instrumental version of the song "I Go Swimming", first included on Gabriel's 1983 Plays Live album.

=== US 12" single (20749-0) ===
1. "Red Rain" – 5:35
2. "Ga-Ga" (instrumental) – 4:31
3. "Walk Through the Fire" – 3:31

== Personnel ==
- Jerry Marotta – drums
- Chris Hughes – Linn programming
- Stewart Copeland – hi-hat
- Tony Levin – bass guitar
- David Rhodes – guitar, backing vocals
- Daniel Lanois – guitar
- Peter Gabriel – vocals, piano, CMI, Prophet-5
- Kevin Killen – mixer

== Charts ==
=== Studio version ===
Chart performance for "Red Rain" studio version
Chart (1986–1987)	Peak position
Ireland (IRMA)	27
Luxembourg (Radio Luxembourg)	28
UK Singles (Official Charts)	46
US Mainstream Rock Airplay (Billboard)	3

=== Live version ===
Chart performance for "Red Rain" live version
Chart (1994)	Peak position
Canada Top Singles (RPM)	63
UK Singles (Official Charts)	39
US Mainstream Rock Airplay (Billboard)	33

== Bibliography ==
- Easlea, Daryl (2013). Without Frontiers: The Life and Music of Peter Gabriel. London: Omnibus Press. ISBN 978-1-78038-315-6.
- Scott, George (2012). Classic Albums: So. Classic Albums. United Kingdom: Eagle Rock Entertainment and Peter Gabriel Records Ltd.
- Scarfe, Graeme (2021). Peter Gabriel: Every Album, Every Song. United Kingdom: SonicBond. ISBN 978-1-78952-138-2.
