= Steam (Peter Gabriel song) =

1992 single by Peter Gabriel

Single by Peter Gabriel

from the album Us
- Released: December 1992
- Genre: Funk rock
- Length: 6:03 (album version); 5:19 (video edit); 4:45 (radio edit)
- Label: Real World; Virgin
- Songwriter: Peter Gabriel
- Producers: Daniel Lanois; Peter Gabriel

Peter Gabriel singles chronology
"Digging in the Dirt" (1992)	"Steam" (1992)	"Blood of Eden" (1993)

Music video
- "Steam" on YouTube

"Steam" is a song by the English rock musician Peter Gabriel, released as the second single from his sixth album, Us (1992). The single was issued in the United States in December 1992 and in the United Kingdom the following month. It charted in several countries, including the UK, where it reached number 10, and in Canada, where it reached number one. In the United States, it became Gabriel's final top-40 hit on the Billboard Hot 100, peaking at number 32. Gabriel performed "Steam" on his 1993–1994 Secret World Tour; a live recording from this tour was included on his Secret World Live album. The song's accompanying music video was directed by Stephen R. Johnson.

== Background ==
Gabriel has said that "Steam" is about a relationship in which the woman is sophisticated, bright, cultured, and knows everything about anything, whereas the man knows nothing about anything; however, he does know about the woman, and she does not know much about herself. He mentioned that the song had an "obvious sexual reference" and was derived from an abandoned idea from his third solo album with Steve Lilywhite, which was later transformed into the album track "And Through the Wire".

On "Steam", Tony Levin played the bass part with set of drum sticks called funk fingers, which he attached to his digits to achieve a more percussive tone. Levin first used the technique on Gabriel's song "Big Time". The chorus of "Steam" features sixth chords played on the guitar by Leo Nocentelli.

In a 1992 interview, Gabriel mentioned that he advocated against the idea of releasing "Steam" as the first single from Us. He called it the only song on the album that was "backward looking" and worried that it would be dismissed as a retread of "Sledgehammer". Similarly, critic Roger Catlin of The Hartford Courant comments that "Steam" is "not indicative of the contemplative mood of the rest of the album", just as "Sledgehammer" was not indicative of So. An alternative version of this song called "Quiet Steam" was a B-side on the "Digging in the Dirt" single. It is a lo-fi take on the version that appeared on Us without any brass instruments. Gabriel said that the removal of these instruments "straight away makes it a song without any 'Sledgehammer' references". On Secret World Live, "Steam" is preceded by the "Quiet Steam" version. Both "Quiet Steam" and "Steam" were part of the set list for Gabriel's 1993–1994 Secret World Tour.

== Release ==
"Steam" initially received airplay on US album oriented rock radio stations in late 1992. Radio & Records reported that it was among the most added songs in that format in its 6 November 1992 edition of the publication. In December, "Steam" was released as a retail single, with the CD edition including remixes from David Bottrill and the Bomb Squad. During the week ending 19 December 1992, "Steam" debuted on the US Billboard Hot 100 at number 80. The following month, it peaked at number 32 on that listing. "Steam" also reached number 1 on the Billboard Modern Rock Tracks chart and number 2 on the Album Rock Tracks chart.

Music Week mentioned in its 26 December 1992 edition of the publication that "Steam" would be released by Virgin Records in the United Kingdom on 4 January 1993. According to the publication, advertising was slated to take place in retail stores including Woolworths, Our Price, and HMV, with the latter also including the song in single ads in Melody Maker and NME. "Steam" debuted at number 17 on the UK Singles Chart and peaked at number 10 the following week. In Canada, the single topped the RPM 100 Hit Tracks chart on the week of 27 February 1993, replacing Whitney Houston's "I Will Always Love You" after an eight-week run. "Steam" also charted within the Top 10 in Iceland, Ireland, New Zealand and Portugal.

== Critical reception ==
Reviewing the song for Cash Box, Randy Clark said that "Steam" resembled Gabriel's previous singles "Big Time" and "Sledgehammer". Mike Joyce from The Washington Post named it "such sure-fire Top 40 ammo" and "a likable (if shamelessly obvious) sequel" to Gabriel's 1986 hit "Sledgehammer". Alec Foege from Spin felt the song, "with its pressure-cooked chorus (Give me steam / And how you feel can make you real) and greasy organ riff, practically parodies Prince's 'Cream'."

Writing for Music Week, Alan Jones called "Steam" "more upbeat [and] less adventurous" than Gabriel's previous single, "Digging in the Dirt". In his weekly UK chart commentary, James Masterton stated, that the correspondingly ingenious video for "Steam" "will propel this into the Top 10." Dave Morrison of Select magazine felt that "Steam" came the closest to achieving "raw excitement" on Us with its "horn-propelled" arrangement.

== Music video ==
The music video for "Steam" was directed by Stephen R. Johnson, who also directed the videos for Gabriel's earlier hits "Sledgehammer" and "Big Time". Johnson said he wanted to cram the video with as many "things" as possible. The music video features digital imagery and numerous instances of sexual symbolism. Gabriel suggested the idea of appearing with a fake muscular physique in the music video, saying that "it was a lot quicker to put on a body like that than actually building up in a gym. I didn't quite have the discipline for that." Douglas Jines, who edited the music video for "Steam", won the MTV Video Music Award for Best Editing at the 1993 MTV Video Music Awards. At the same awards ceremony, the song also won the MTV Video Music Award for Best Visual Effects. The music video was later shown on the 1994 video Computer Animation Festival Vol. 2.0.

== Awards and nominations ==
Year	Nominee / work	Award	Result
1993	MTV Video Music Award	Best Male Video	Nominated
1993	MTV Video Music Award	Best Visual Effects	Won
1993	MTV Video Music Award	Best Editing	Won
1994	Grammy Award	Best Solo Rock Vocal Performance	Nominated
1994	Grammy Award	Best Music Video	Won

== Track listing ==
All songs written by Peter Gabriel.

US CD Maxi (Geffen-GEFDM-21820)

1. "Steam" (LP version) – 6:01
2. "Games Without Frontiers" (Massive / DB mix) – 5:18
3. "Steam" (Oh, Oh, Let Off Steam mix 12") – 6:40
4. "Steam" (Oh, Oh, Let Off Steam mix dub) – 5:42

== Personnel ==
- Peter Gabriel – vocals, keyboards, percussion, horn arrangement
- David Rhodes – guitar
- Leo Nocentelli – guitar
- Tony Levin – bass guitar
- Manu Katché – electronic drums
- The Babacar Faye Drummers – Sabar drums
- David Bottrill – programming
- Richard Blair – programming
- Tim Green – tenor saxophone
- Reggie Houston – baritone saxophone
- Wayne Jackson – trumpet
- Renard Poche – trombone
- Daniel Lanois – horn arrangement

== Charts ==
=== Weekly charts ===
Chart (1993)	Peak position
Australia (ARIA)	29
Belgium (Ultratop 50 Flanders)	25
Canada Top Singles (RPM)	1
Canada Adult Contemporary (RPM)	31
Europe (Eurochart Hot 100)	23
Europe (European Hit Radio)	4
Germany (GfK)	48
Iceland (Íslenski Listinn Topp 40)	5
Ireland (IRMA)	7
Netherlands (Dutch Top 40)	16
Netherlands (Single Top 100)	27
New Zealand (Recorded Music NZ)	7
Portugal (AFP)	8
Sweden (Sverigetopplistan)	28
UK Singles (Official Charts)	10
UK Airplay (Music Week)	1
US Billboard Hot 100	32
US Alternative Airplay (Billboard)	1
US Mainstream Rock Airplay (Billboard)	2
US Pop Airplay (Billboard)	13
US Contemporary Hit Radio (Radio and Records)	9

=== Year-end charts ===
Chart (1993)	Position
Canada Top Singles (RPM)	21
Europe (European Hit Radio)	33
Iceland (Íslenski Listinn Topp 40)	40
UK Airplay (Music Week)	35
US Album Rock Tracks (Billboard)	25
US Modern Rock Tracks (Billboard)	23

== Release history ==
Region	Date	Format(s)	Label(s)	Ref.
United States	December 1992	Commercial	Geffen	
United Kingdom	4 January 1993	7-inch vinyl; CD; cassette	Real World; Virgin	
Australia	18 January 1993	CD1; cassette	Real World; Virgin	
Japan	27 January 1993	CD	Real World; Virgin	
Australia	30 January 1993	CD2	Real World; Virgin	

== See also ==
- Number-one Billboard modern rock hits of 1992
- List of RPM number-one singles of 1993
