= Digging in the Dirt =

1992 single by Peter Gabriel

Single by Peter Gabriel

from the album Us
- B-side: "Quiet Steam"
- Released: 7 September 1992
- Genre: Art rock
- Length: 5:16 (album version); 4:23 (edit)
- Label: Real World; Virgin
- Songwriter: Peter Gabriel
- Producers: Daniel Lanois; Peter Gabriel

Peter Gabriel singles chronology
"Solsbury Hill" (1990)	"Digging in the Dirt" (1992)	"Steam" (1993)

Music video
- "Digging in the Dirt" on YouTube

"Digging in the Dirt" is a song by British musician Peter Gabriel. It was released on 7 September 1992 by Real World and Virgin Records as the first single taken from his sixth studio album, Us (1992). The song, written and co-produced by Gabriel, was a minor hit on the US Billboard Hot 100, peaking at number 52, but it topped both the Billboard Modern Rock Tracks and Album Rock Tracks charts. The song was moderately successful on the UK Singles Chart, where it peaked at number 24, and it reached the top 10 in Canada, Portugal, and Sweden. The accompanying music video was directed by John Downer.

== Background ==
"Digging in the Dirt" began with some percussion tracks played by Hossam Ramzy that originated from "Zaar", a song on Gabriel's Passion album. Ramzy's surdo and duf tracks were then combined with a rhythm pattern from an Akai MPC60 and a synth bass played on a Roland D-50. Gabriel then ad-libbed some vocal parts, first coming up with the "shut your mouth" lyric, which was one of the song's working titles. At other points of its development, the song was also temporarily known as "Plod".

Gabriel stated that the lyrics to "Digging in the Dirt" were about examining his "darker side" and passive-aggressive behaviors. He took inspiration from Why We Kill: Understanding Violence Across Cultures and Disciplines, a book that analyzed characteristics shared amongst murderers. Some of the lyrics also reference the psychotherapy that Gabriel was receiving at the time.

== Recording ==
Initially, Gabriel recorded a demo version of the song outlining its rough structure: it featured Gabriel on keyboards and a drum groove from the MPC-60, with David Rhodes and producer Daniel Lanois playing guitars alongside him. After developing this initial version, Gabriel traveled down to Lanois' Kingsway Studio in New Orleans for one week, where Epiphone guitar parts by Leo Nocentelli and a horn section were recorded, although the horns did not make the final mix.

Eventually, Gabriel held a set of sessions with his studio band at Work Room of Real World Studios, where they played their parts live to the pre-existing demo recording. The line-up consisted of Rhodes and Lanois on guitars, Tony Levin playing a Music Man bass guitar and Manu Katché on drums. Rather than a standard drum kit, Gabriel assembled a special African percussion kit for Katché to play, including a drum from Burundi that sonically resembled a snare drum with added snare wires. A muted small jazz kick drum from Gabriel's time with Genesis was also used as part of the kit.

However, most of these initial band parts were deemed unsuitable and were discarded. Thus, a second round of band sessions took place in the Big Room at Real World Studios. This time, Katché eschewed his percussion kit in favor of a Yamaha drum set with small splash cymbals replacing the usual hi-hat. Bottrill and his assistant Richard Blair looped sections of Katché's drumming and tightened up his parts for more precision. These parts were augmented with additional rhythms from an Akai S1000, sequenced Burundi drum hits, and break beats. Levin redid his parts on a Status bass after a solid rhythm was laid down.

Richard Macphail, who was a childhood friend of Gabriel, contributed backing vocals on the song. Gabriel had granted Macphail and his wife the opportunity to record three songs at Real World Studios and later invited Macphail to sing on "Digging in the Dirt". The backing vocalists, which also included Ayub Ogada and Peter Hammill alongside Gabriel and Macphail, recorded their parts using a Neumann U 47; the four of them dubbed themselves "the Everlys" due to the vocal harmonies they achieved through multitracking.

== Release ==
"Digging in the Dirt" was released as the lead single from Us. Several b-sides were issued with the single, including "Quiet Steam", a stripped back and mellower version of the album's next single, "Steam". The CD Maxi single included two additional tracks, including an abridged recording of "Digging in the Dirt" with most of its vocals stripped with the exception of the "this time you've gone too far" lyric. The other track on this release was an instrumental composition titled "Bashi-Bazouk", which was also included as a Japanese bonus track on Us.

In August 1992, Geffen Records announced that "Digging in the Dirt" would be the first single from Us in the United States. Within one week of being serviced to US AOR radio stations, 78% of all stations in that format had included the song in their playlists according to Radio & Records. By the week of 18 September 1992, "Digging in the Dirt" was among the most added songs to contemporary hit radio. The song debuted on the Billboard Hot 100 at number 85 on the week dated 3 October 1992. The release of "Digging in the Dirt" coincided with the launch of the music video, which received heavy rotation on both MTV and VH1. One week later, the song reached number one on the Billboard Alternative Airplay chart. In its 17 October 1992 edition of the Hot 100, Billboard noted that the song had failed to make a major impact on the chart, where it stalled at number 78 for the second consecutive week. The song eventually peaked at number 52 on the Billboard Hot 100 during its eighth week on the chart and dropped out of the Hot 100 altogether after eleven weeks.

"Digging in the Dirt" performed better in the UK, where it peaked at number 24, but still underperformed in comparison to "Sledgehammer", the lead single from So six years prior. During the week ending 12 September 1992, "Digging in the Dirt" was the most added song to European Hit Radio stations, with the most significant airplay occurring in the United Kingdom, Sweden, Denmark, and Germany. The following week, "Digging in the Dirt" remained the most added song to European radio stations, with particular gains in Scandinavia and the Iberian Peninsula, where it entered those regions' top ten airplay listings.

== Critical reception ==
Upon release, "Digging in the Dirt" received mostly positive reviews from music critics. Writing for Music Week, Alan Jones labelled "Digging in the Dirt" as their pick of the week in their 19 September 1992 edition of the publication. He called it a "strong and intense dirge" and thought that it was a "fine way to end a six-year silence." Greg Kot of the Chicago Tribune labeling the song as "excellent". He further wrote in his review for Rolling Stone that the song was "instantly engaging and subversive." The Oxnard Press-Courier noted the autobiographical nature of "Digging in the Dirt" and characterised it as an "ominous" track.

Billboard magazine characterised the song as a "lyrically jolting gem" with a "forboding [sic], hip-hop-derived groove." Cashbox thought that the song had "the same type of cerebral puns and rhymes" as his song "Big Time". They said that "Digging in the Dirt" sounded "more like a retro-therapeutic visit to a shrink" and believed that the contributions of Daniel Lanois resulted in the song sounding "eclectic". Jim Sullivan of The Boston Globe believed that "Digging in the Dirt" was one of the only few radio-friendly songs on Us. Entertainment Weekly was favorable toward the chorus of "Digging in the Dirt" and predicted that the special effects found in the music video would have more of a lasting legacy than the song itself.

Retrospective reviews of "Digging in the Dirt have also been positive. Stephen Thomas Erlewine of AllMusic highlighted "Digging in the Dirt" as an accessible track with an "insistent pulse". Paste ranked the song number 15 on its list of the 20 greatest Peter Gabriel songs, noting the contrast between the "low and groovy verses", the angry chorus, and the post-chorus that "coos with fragility."

== Live performances ==
The Secret World Live version of the song features a chaotic blend of high-pitched distorted guitar (by guitarist David Rhodes) as well as occasional jarring synth bass stabs and an expansive performance on the drums. Gabriel wore a special helmet with a video camera attached, showing in great detail his facial expressions, while moving in time with the music. This is used to create what Q magazine described as an "unappetising" image of Gabriel, most prominent during the "freak-out" sequence in which the camera is pointed down Gabriel's throat, nostrils, and earlobes. The song was later performed on Gabriel's 2002 Growing Up Tour and appeared on its accompanying live concert film.

Gabriel revisited the song for his New Blood album, which featured orchestral rearrangements of Gabriel's music catalog. Due to difficulties in tackling the song's rhythmic elements without bass and drums, the song was nearly dropped from the album, but Gabriel avoided this by working extensively with the woodwind players to achieve a satisfactory groove. Gabriel also performed the song on his 2014 Back to Front Tour and his I/O Tour in 2023, with a live version from the former tour also appearing on his Back to Front: Live in London album.

== Music video ==
The music video for the single was directed by John Downer and utilised stop motion animation, a technique used in the videos for Gabriel's earlier hits "Sledgehammer" and "Big Time". The work was painstaking, especially for Gabriel himself who was required to lie still for hours at a time over the course of several days.

According to Gabriel, "the meadow of flowers from the final scenes of the "Digging in the Dirt" video were filmed at the edge of the carpark at Real World Studios." The video is largely an exploration of the issues in his personal life at the time, the end of his relationship with Rosanna Arquette, his desire to reconnect with his daughter and the self-healing he was looking for in therapy.

Gabriel returned to stop motion and claymation that were previously used on some of Gabriel's So era singles in the mid 1980s, forgoing the computer graphics used in "Steam". In the video, Gabriel is displayed in a variety of disturbing imagery, including being buried alive, consumed by an overgrowth of foliage (thanks to the stop-motion process) and flying into a rage while trying to swat a wasp. Gabriel stated that he wanted the video to encapsulate the feeling of anger, but was uncomfortable depicting violence toward women, so the rage was instead directed at the wasp. Francesca Gonshaw depicted the woman in the video.

Initially, the word "DIG" forms in the grass while dark imagery plays. Gabriel morphs into a skeleton while trying to excavate himself. Ultimately, the mushrooms sprout to form the word "HELP," followed by "HEAL" in blooming flowers after Gabriel has emerged from underground, now clad in white. In 1993, the video won the Grammy Award for Best Short Form Music Video.

== Awards and nominations ==
Year	Nominee / work	Award	Result
1992	Grammy Award	Best Male Rock Vocal Performance	Nominated
1992	Grammy Award	Best Rock Song	Nominated
1992	Grammy Award	Best Music Video	Won
1993	MTV Video Music Awards	Video of the Year	Nominated
1993	MTV Video Music Awards	Viewer's Choice Award	Nominated
1993	MTV Video Music Awards	International Viewer's Choice Award for MTV Europe	Nominated

== Track listings ==
All songs were written by Peter Gabriel.

- US-CD Maxi (Geffen-GEFDM-21816)
1. "Digging in the Dirt" (LP Version)-5:16
2. "Digging in the Dirt" (Instrumental) – 5:10
3. "Quiet Steam" – 6:25
4. "Bashi-Bazouk" – 4:47
- US-7' (Geffen-GEFS7-19136)
1. "Digging in the Dirt" (LP Version)-5:16
2. "Quiet Steam" – 6:23
- US-CD Promo (Geffen-PRO-CD-4446)
1. "Digging in the Dirt" -4:23 (Edit)
2. "Digging in the Dirt" -5:16 (LP Version)

== Personnel ==
- Peter Gabriel – lead vocals, programming, synth bass, keyboards
- Tony Levin – bass guitar
- David Rhodes – electric guitar
- Manu Katché – drums
- David Bottrill – additional programming

Additional musicians

- Richard Blair – additional programming
- Leo Nocentelli – additional guitar
- Hossam Ramzy – surdo
- Babacar Faye – djembe
- Assane Thiam – tama
- Ayub Ogada – backing vocals
- Peter Hammill – backing vocals
- Richard Macphail – backing vocals

== Charts ==
=== Weekly charts ===
Chart (1992)	Peak position
Australia (ARIA)	23
Austria (Ö3 Austria Top 40)	29
Belgium (Ultratop 50 Flanders)	26
Canada Top Singles (RPM)	6
Europe (Eurochart Hot 100)	24
Europe (European Hit Radio)	3
France (SNEP)	34
Germany (GfK)	23
Netherlands (Dutch Top 40)	30
Netherlands (Single Top 100)	39
New Zealand (Recorded Music NZ)	25
Portugal (AFP)	8
Sweden (Sverigetopplistan)	9
Switzerland (Schweizer Hitparade)	12
UK Singles (Official Charts)	24
UK Airplay (Music Week)	12
US Billboard Hot 100	52
US Alternative Airplay (Billboard)	1
US Mainstream Rock (Billboard)	1
US Pop Airplay (Billboard)	37
US Cash Box Top 100	46

=== Year-end charts ===
Chart (1992)	Position
Canada Top Singles (RPM)	51
Europe (European Hit Radio)	21
Sweden (Topplistan)	66
US Album Rock Tracks (Billboard)	27
US Modern Rock Tracks (Billboard)	9

== Release history ==
Region	Date	Format(s)	Label(s)	Ref.
Australia	7 September 1992	CD; cassette	Real World; Virgin	
United Kingdom	7 September 1992	7-inch vinyl; CD; cassette	Real World; Virgin	
United Kingdom	14 September 1992	CD box set	Real World; Virgin	
Japan	16 September 1992	Mini-CD	Real World; Virgin	
Japan	30 September 1992	Maxi-CD	Real World; Virgin	
Australia	5 October 1992	CD digipak	Real World; Virgin	
Australia	30 November 1992	12-inch vinyl	Real World; Virgin	

== See also ==
- List of number-one mainstream rock hits (United States)
- Number one modern rock hits of 1992
