= Levon Minassian =

French-Armenian duduk player

Lévon Minassian is a French-Armenian duduk player. He was born in Marseille in the district of Saint-Jerome. He played for the soundtrack of Mayrig. He has collaborated with Charles Aznavour, Helene Segara, Peter Gabriel, Tony Levin, Armand Amar and Sting.

== Discography ==
=== Solo ===
- 1998 : The Doudouk Beyond Borders Lévon Minassian and Friends
- 2006 : Songs From a World Apart Lévon Minassian & Armand Amar
- 2016 : Sources Lévon Minassian

=== Collaboration ===
- 1992 : Us Peter Gabriel : Plays on Come Talk to Me, Blood of Eden and Fourteen Black Paintings.
- 1994 : Secret World Live - Peter Gabriel
- 1995 : World Diary - Tony Levin : Plays on Mingled Roots & La Tristesse Amoureuse De La Nuit.
- 2003 : Sacred Love - Sting
- 2008 : Big Blue Ball - Various Artists, Starring Peter Gabriel, Natacha Atlas, Sinéad O'Connor, Billy Cobham, Manu Katché, etc. - Plays on Forest.

=== Movie scores ===
- 1985 : Les mémoires tatouées - A film by Georges Garvarentz
- 1991 : Mayrig - A film by Henri Verneuil
- 1992 : 588 rue Paradis - Henri Verneuil
- 2002 : Amen - Costas Gavras
- 2002 : L'Odyssée de l'espèce - Yvan Cassar

== Sources ==
- Biography : http://www.levonminassian.com/biographie
- Levon Sources : http://www.levonminassian.com/
- Henri Verneuil : https://www.imdb.com/name/nm0894577/
- La grande vie Film : http://www.allocine.fr/film/fichefilm-36119/casting/
- Amen Costa Gavras : http://www.levonminassian.com/projets/amen/

== Awards ==
- 2003 Chevalier de l'Ordre des Arts et des Lettres. Or in English, Order of Arts and Letters.
