= David Rhodes (guitarist) =

Musical artist (b. 1956)

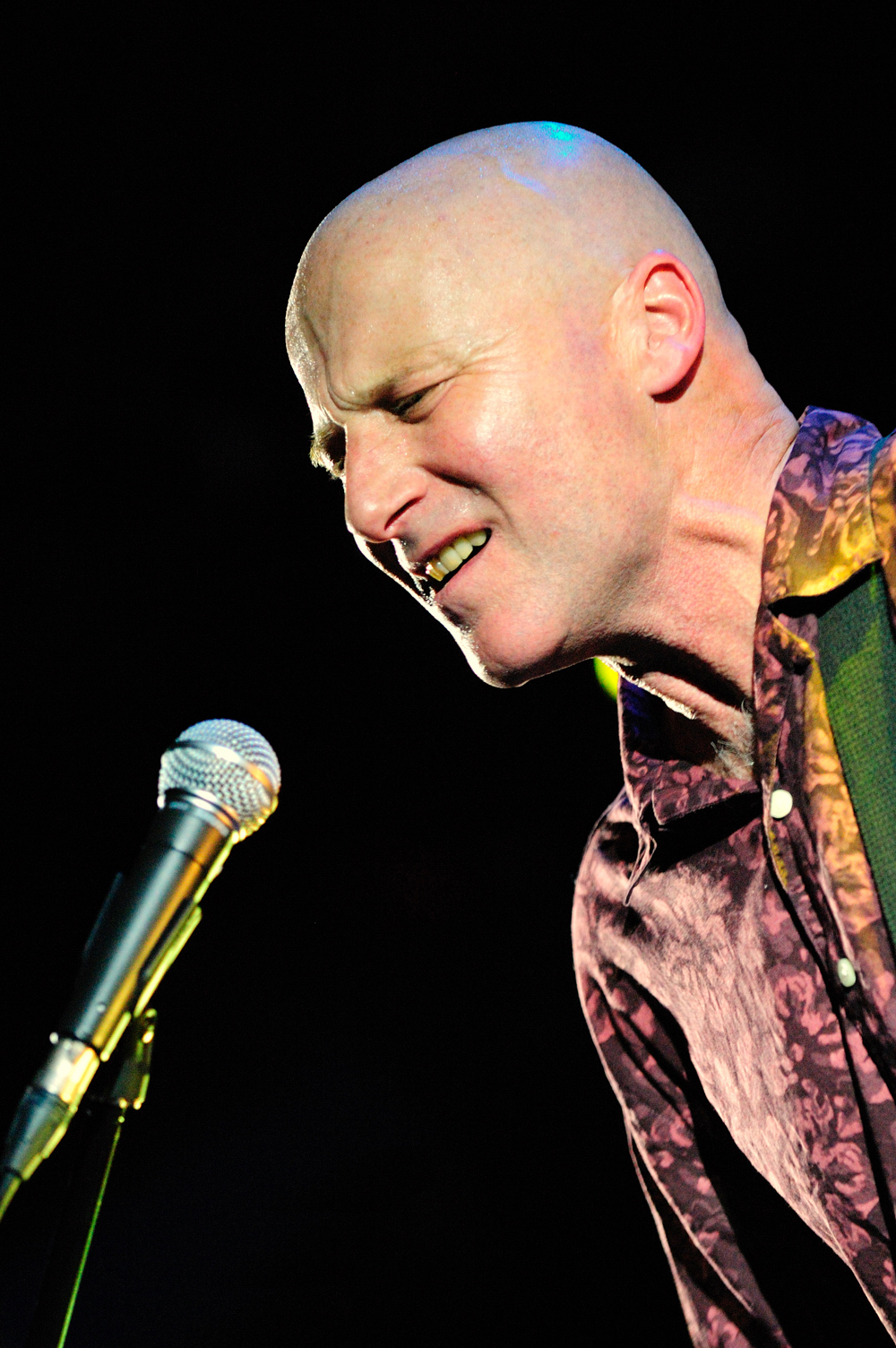
- David Rhodes in 2010

Background information
- Born: 2 May 1956 (age 70); London, England
- Genres: Rock; progressive rock
- Occupations: Musician; songwriter; producer; composer
- Instruments: Guitar; vocals; percussion
- Years active: 1979–present
- Label: Realworld
- Formerly of: Akiko Yano; Blancmange; Geoffrey Oryema; Franco Battiato; Japan; Joan Armatrading; Kate Bush; New Order; Paul McCartney; Paul Okenfold; Peter Gabriel; Random Hold; Roy Orbison; T Bone Burnett; Talk Talk; The Pretenders; Scott Walker; Tim Finn; Toni Childs; Tori Amos; Vitamin Z; Youssou N'Dour; Yungchen Llamo
- Website: david-rhodes.uk

David John Sydney Rhodes (born 2 May 1956) is an English guitarist, singer, songwriter and long-time collaborator of Peter Gabriel. He was the guitarist and vocalist for the British rock band Random Hold from 1976 to 1980, and has been the principal studio and touring guitarist for Gabriel since 1980. Rhodes has released two solo albums.

== Biography ==
David Rhodes was born on 2 May 1956 in London. He studied Art at Central Saint Martins and then went on to complete a degree in Sculpture at Goldsmiths, University of London, where he developed an interest in music. Shortly after graduation, he began recording and was a founding member of the rock band Random Hold, in which he performed vocals and lead guitar. He was soon asked to play with Peter Gabriel. His first appearance was on 1980's Peter Gabriel (also referred to as Melt), Gabriel's third studio album. Rhodes has been the principal studio and touring guitarist for Gabriel since then.

In 2009, he released his first studio album, Bittersweet. The progressive rock album was the product of a long and complex writing process involving numerous layered instrumental tracks and effects, and non-standard guitar tunings. Rhodes developed the songs over the course of several years before recording them. Though he used a wide range of equipment in the recording studio, Rhodes indicated he uses a simpler setup in live settings: a Gibson Robot Guitar to easily switch among guitar tunings and a Native Instruments computer application to produce effects and background tracks. He embarked on occasional short tours with bassist Charlie Jones and drummer Ged Lynch in support of Bittersweet in the following years.

When Rhodes decided to return to the recording studio in 2013, he, Jones, and Lynch envisioned recreating the dynamic they had established on the road for a new album. The trio rehearsed at the recording studio and then laid the instrumental tracks in five days. After vocal tracks and other production were completed, Rhodes was released via PledgeMusic. Rhodes returned to road, performing in support of the new album with Lynch and Welch bassist Gaz Williams.

Rhodes composed scores for the films Lucky and Zorba by Enzo D'Alò and L'uomo perfetto by Luca Lucini as well as for the 2001 video game Atlantis III: The New World.

== Collaborations ==
With Peter Gabriel

- Peter Gabriel (Mercury Records, 1980)
- Peter Gabriel (Geffen Records, 1982)
- So (Geffen, 1986)
- Us (Real World Records, 1992)
- Secret World Live (Geffen, 1994)
- Up (Geffen, 2002)
- I/O (Real World, 2023)

With Japan

- The Art of Parties (version) (Virgin Records, 1982), plus live performance 1981/82

With Blancmange

- Happy Families (London Records, 1982) (guitar on 6 tracks)

With Talk Talk

- The Colour of Spring (EMI, 1986) (guitar on 3 tracks)
- London 1986 (Pond Life, 1999)

With Joan Armatrading

- Secret Secrets (A&M Records, 1985)

With Toni Childs

- Union (A&M, 1988)
- House of Hope (A&M, 1991)
- The Woman's Boat (Geffen, 1994)

With Paul McCartney

- Flowers in the Dirt (Parlophone Records, 1989)

With Tim Finn

- Tim Finn (Capitol Records, 1989)

With Roy Orbison

- Mystery Girl (Virgin, 1989)

With Julia Fordham

- Swept (Virgin, 1991)

With Tori Amos

- Little Earthquakes (Atlantic Records, 1992)

With Franco Battiato

- L'imboscata (Mercury Records, 1996)
- Ferro battuto (Polygram, 2001)

With Kate Bush

- Before the Dawn (Fish People, 2016, recorded 2014)

With Claudio Baglioni

- Oltre (CBS, 1990)
