= Yuz Museum Shanghai =

- Established: 2014
- Location: 35 Fenggu Road, Xuhui District, Shanghai
- Type: Art Museum
- Public transit access: Exit 7, Yunjin Road, line 11
- Website: www.yuzmshanghai.org

The Yuz Museum Shanghai (Chinese: 余德耀美术馆) is a museum in the West Bund in Xuhui District, Shanghai, China, operated by the non-profit Yuz Foundation. Designed by Japanese architect Sou Fujimoto, it is located in the renovated hangar of the former Shanghai Longhua Airport, occupying premises with a total area of more than 9,000 square meters, including a main gallery of over 3,000 square meters. The museum opened on 17 May 2014.

== History ==
The Yuz Museum was founded by Budi Tek, a Chinese-Indonesian entrepreneur, philanthropist, and art collector. Tek's Chinese name is Yu Deyao, which gives the museum its name. He began his collection with Chinese contemporary oil paintings, especially works created from the early 1980s to the late 1990s, and the museum's collection has since grown into a significant collection of Chinese contemporary art.

The current chair of the museum's academic committee is Wu Hung, also the founder and director of the Center for the Art of East Asia at the University of Chicago, the consulting curator at the Smart Museum of Art, and an elected member of the American Academy of Arts and Sciences.

In 2018, Yuz Museum and the Los Angeles County Museum of Art (LACMA) announced the joint launch of a foundation to preserve Budi Tek's collection of Chinese contemporary art, and ensure that the collection will remain intact and permanently available for exhibitions and academic research.

== Past exhibitions ==
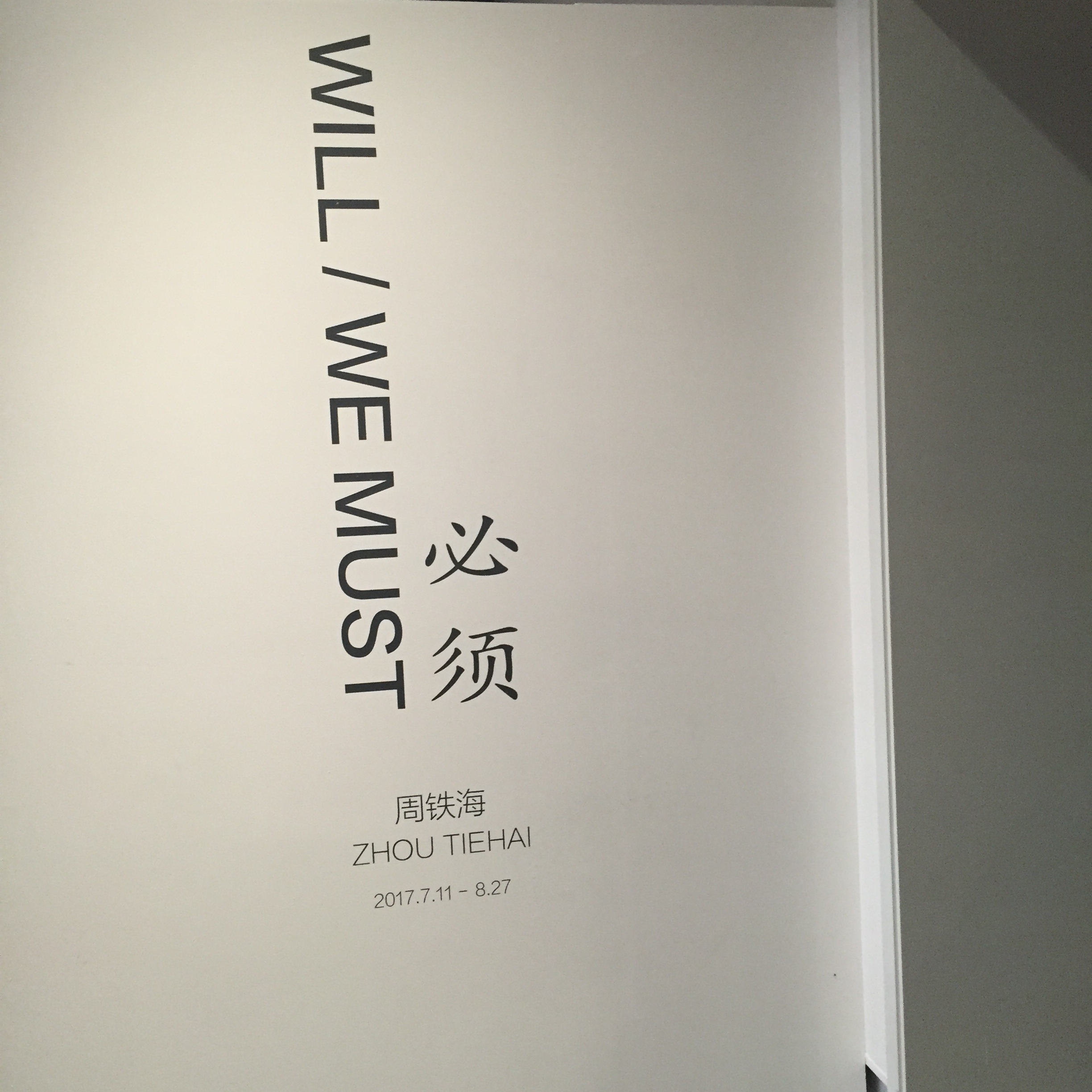

- Ni Youyu: ∞ (2019.8.17 – 2019.10.20 )
- Nine Journeys Through Time (2019.7.3 – 2019.10.7 )
- Duet: A Tan Ping Retrospective 双重奏：谭平回顾展 (2019.6.15 – 2019.9.22 )
- Su-Mei Tse: Nested 谢素梅：安棲 (2018.12.18 – 2019.3.24)
- The Real Deal is Talking with Dad 陈可：和爸爸聊天才是正经事 (2018.12.22 – 2019.3.24)
- Maurizio Cattelan – THE ARTIST IS PRESENT(2018.10.11 – 2018.12.16)
- Tschabalala Self: Bodega Run (2018.09.22 – 2018.12.09)
- Charlie Chaplin. A vision (2018.06.08 – 2018.10.07)
- Melike Kara: A Taste of Parsley (2018.07.07 – 2018.09.09)
- Random International: Everything & Nothing (2018.04.20 – 2018.09.02)
- Donna Huanca: Cell Echo (2018.03.24 – 2018.06.03)
- Ye Yongqing: 1982-1992 无中生有的年代 (2018.04.12 – 2018.05.20)
- Joshua Nathanson: High Flow (2018.02.03 – 2018.04.04)
- Alicja Kwade: ReReason (2017.12.17 – 2018.04.01)
- Shanghai Galaxy II (2017.11.10 – 2018.02.11)
- The Dance of Icarus (2017.11.12 – 2018.01.21)
- Qin Yifeng's works 秦一峰展 (2017.09.02 – 2017.12.03)
- Math Bass: Serpentine Door (2017.06.24 – 2017.10.08)
- Will / We Must 周铁海：必须 (2017.07.11 – 2017.08.27)
- Kaws: WHERE THE END STARTS (2017.03.28 – 2017.08.13)
- Zhou Li: Shadow of the Wind 周力：白影 (2017.02.25 – 2017.06.04)
- Jennifer West: “Is Film Over?” (2017.03.18 – 2017.05.28)
- Mira Dancy: “FUTURE WOMAN // remake me” (2016.11.8 – 2017.03.12)
- Sun Xun: Prediction Laboratory 孙逊：谶语实验室 (2016.11.19 – 2017.03.05)
- Andy Warhol, SHADOWS (2016.09.04 – 2017.01.15)
- OVERPOP (2016.09.04 – 2017.01.15)
- Alberto Giacometti’s Retrospective (2016.3.22 — 2016.7.31)
- Koo Jeong A: Enigma of Beginnings (2016.3.26 — 2016.5.29)
- Liu Shiyuan: As Simple As Clay 刘诗园：像泥巴一样简单 (2015.11.14 — 2016.1.31)
- Rain Room by Random International (2015.9.1 — 2016.1.3)
- Twin Tracks: Yang Fudong Solo Exhibition “南辕北辙 ”——杨福东作品展 (2015.9.1 — 2015.11.23)
- Secundino Hernández/Entre Primavera y Verano (2015.9.1 — 2015.10.11)
- Huang Yuxing: Liquidus 黄宇兴：熔流 (2015.9.1 — 2015.10.11)
- Myth/History II: Shanghai Galaxy
- Myth / History (2014.5.18 — 2014.11.18)
