= Firoz Mahmud =

Bangladeshi painter

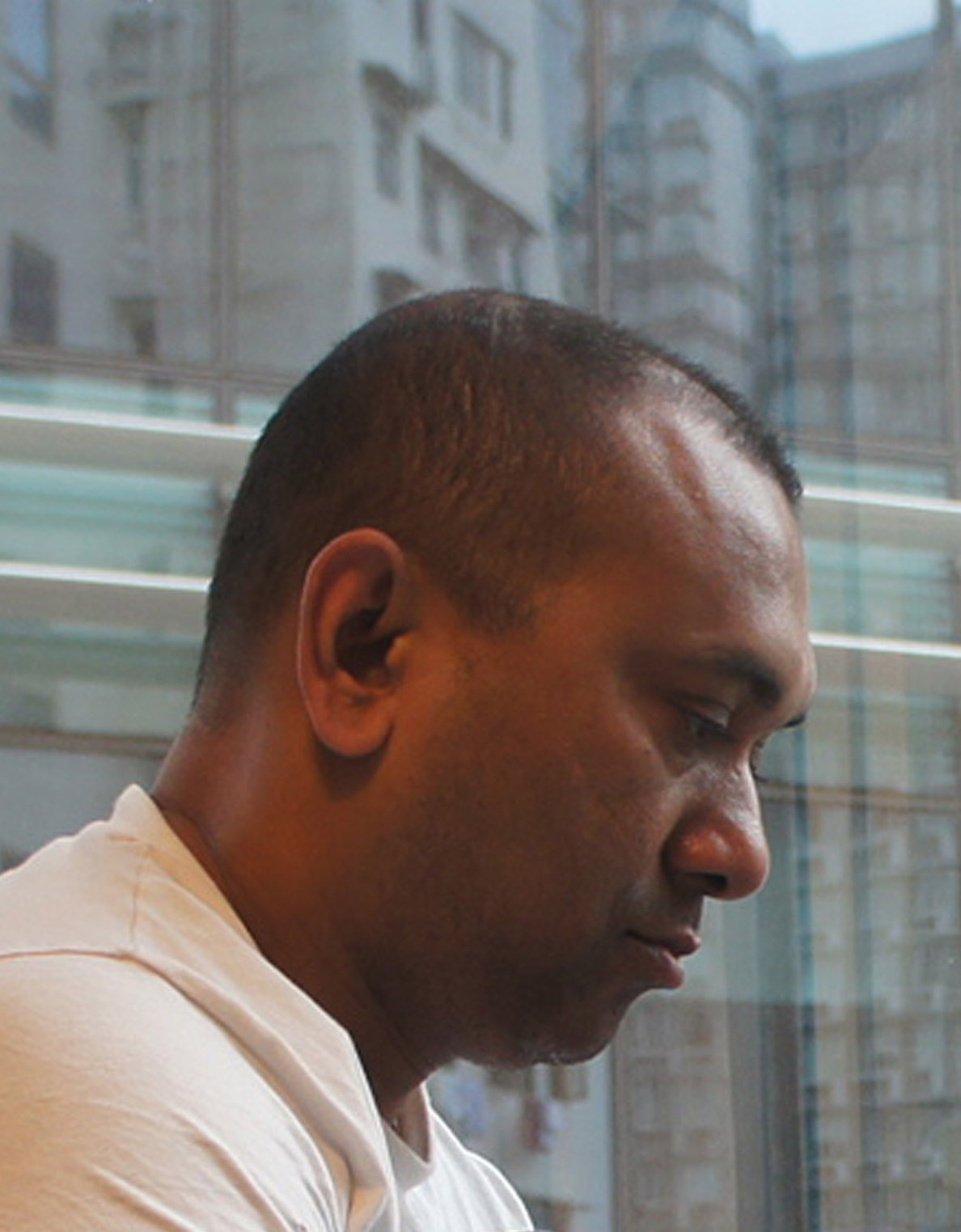
- Firoz Mahmud
- Born: September 5, 1974 (age 51); Khulna, Bangladesh
- Education: University of Dhaka; Tama Art University; Tokyo University of the Arts; Rijksakademie
- Occupation: Visual artist
- Known for: Contemporary Art
- Movement: NinKi: Urgency of Proximate Drawing, Layapa Stencil Painting, Social Dream project
- Website: firoz-mahmud.com

Firoz Mahmud (Bengali: ফিরোজ মাহমুদ) (born September 5, 1974 in Khulna, Bangladesh) is a Bangladeshi visual artist based in Japan. Mahmud was the first Bangladeshi fellow artist in research at Rijksakademie Van Beeldende Kunsten in Amsterdam. His work has been exhibited at the following biennales: Sharjah Biennale, the first Bangkok Art Biennale, at the Dhaka Art Summit, Setouchi Triennale (BDP), the first Aichi Triennial, the Congo Biennale, the first Lahore Biennale, the Cairo Biennale, the Echigo-Tsumari Triennial, and the Asian Biennale.

Mahmud was awarded a guarantee from the Asian Cultural Council (ACC) in New York. Guggenheim Museum's UBS Global Art Initiative and Asia Society invited him to the symposium "Continuous Horizons: Contemporary Art for Asia", No Country: Contemporary Art for South and Southeast Asia Programs. In 2019, Mahmud was nominated for the French COAL prize, which was hosted at Centre Pompidou in Paris.

== Artworks ==
Mahmud exhibited at the Echigo-Tsumari Art Triennial 2006 in Nigata Japan, where he exhibited numerous wooden aeroplanes in the city of Tokamachi. He was one of the finalist artists at The Sovereign Asian Art Prize in 2007 in Hong Kong. He was invited to exhibit at the 9th Sharjah Art Biennial in 2009 where he exhibited a large sculptural installation, 'Halcyon Tarp' with Royal Bengal Tigers. In 2010 he created a 26 feet long fighter aircraft sculptural installation 'Sucker'wfp21' to exhibit at the 1st Aichi Art Triennial at Aichi Arts Center, Aichi Prefectural Museum of Art in 2010. Mahmud was invited to an exhibition 'Step Across This Line', contemporary art from Bangladesh, India and Pakistan in Asia House London co-organized by Grosvenor Gallery and curated by Deeksha Nath.

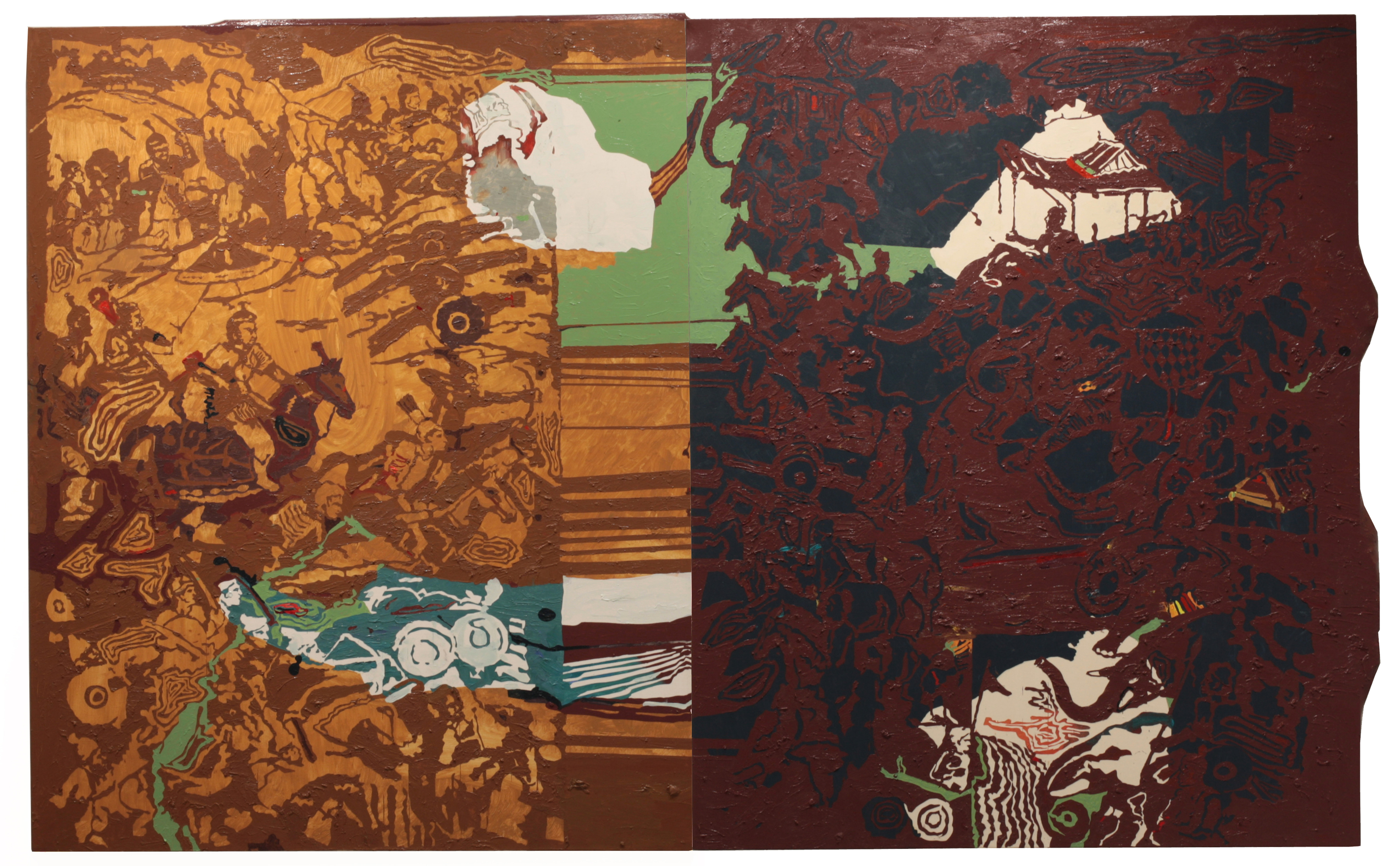
Layapa Stencil Painting 'The Start of the End of the Reign of the Subcontinent: during the time of my forefathers'

=== Painting ===
He exhibited a stencil painting in his solo exhibition 'Lamentation in Two Lies' at the Ota Fine Arts in Tokyo in 2011. He exhibited a solo exhibition 'NinKi: Legacies, Run over the Yamuna' simultaneously with Nandan Ghiya at Exhibit 320 in New Delhi in 2015.

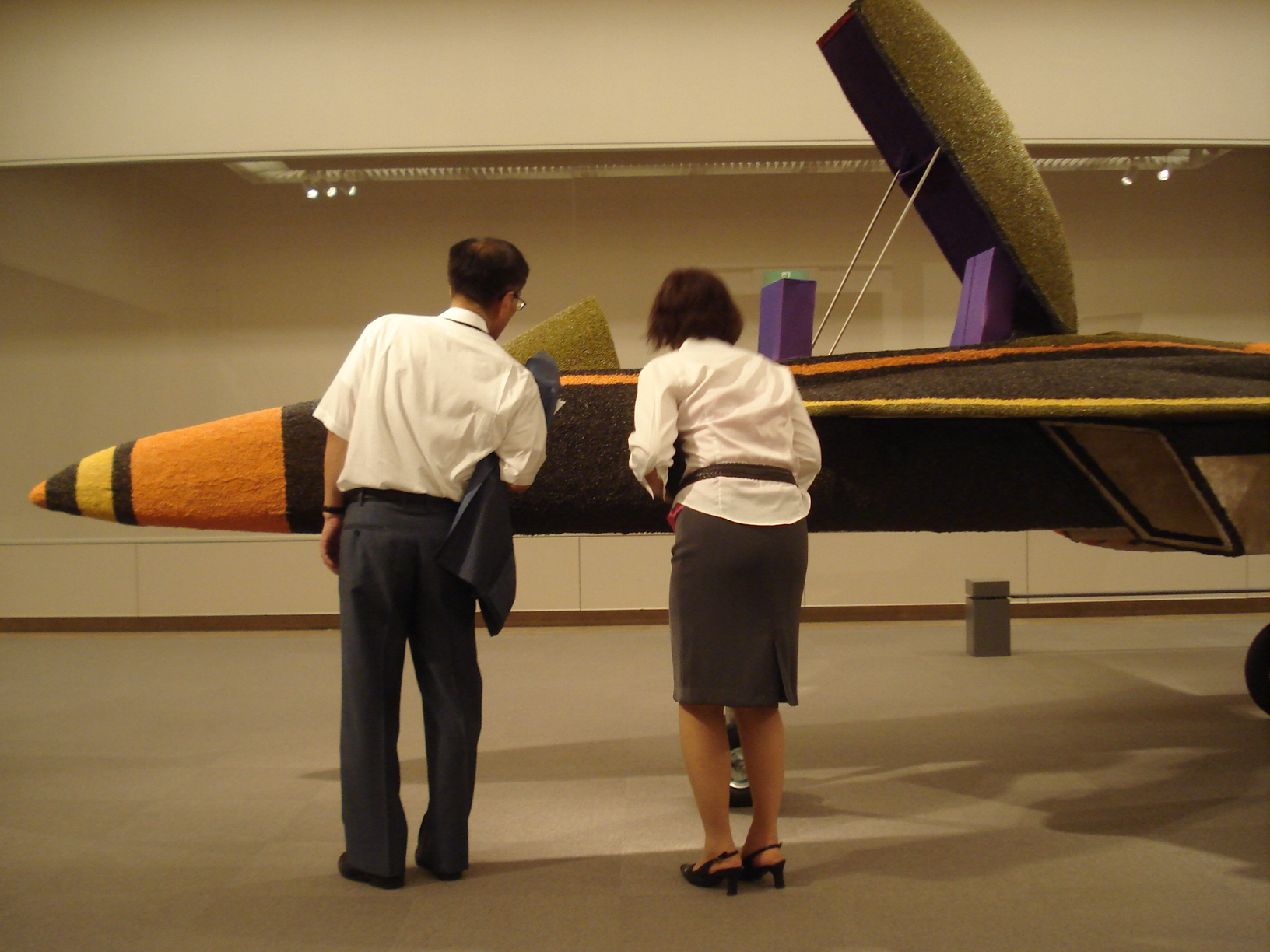
'Sucker'wfp21' aircraft sculptural at Aichi Arts Center, Aichi Prefectural Museum of Art in Nagoya, Japan

=== Drawing ===
Mahmud produced detailed drawings documenting human figures and animals. In the early 1990s, he had an art studio in a dilapidated building in a groceries market around Dhaka New Market area where he made numerous drawings of workers, labourers, vendors and slum-dwellers around the market. He mainly drew with pencil, pen and pastel on journals and sketchbooks which were also studies for paintings. Some of these can be identified as preparatory drawings for particular works, such as 'Evening twilight at Methor Potti (Poronto Bikel, 1997)', which he painted at Hajaribugh sweepers colony in Dhaka, 'Cooking for worker'(1997) and'Bookbinders'(1994).

=== Soaked Dream ===
Soaked Dream is an art project created by Mahmud in 2013. It features drawings, sculptures, videos, and photos portraying the symbolic dream of colonial people, cross-border refugee families, immigrants, diasporas, exodus, deprived people and ethnic minorities who look for prosperity when arriving in their new location. Mahmud arranges families of those communities, makes sculptures of metaphoric eyeglasses with the help of those families and creates photographs. The output of this project was a video of the Chimera project.

== Exhibition ==
=== Solo exhibition ===
Mahmud's solo exhibitions include Ota Fine Arts in Singapore 'Drawing Reverberation', and Abinta Gallery of Fine Arts Dhaka 'Reverberation'.

=== Group exhibition and art biennials/triennials ===
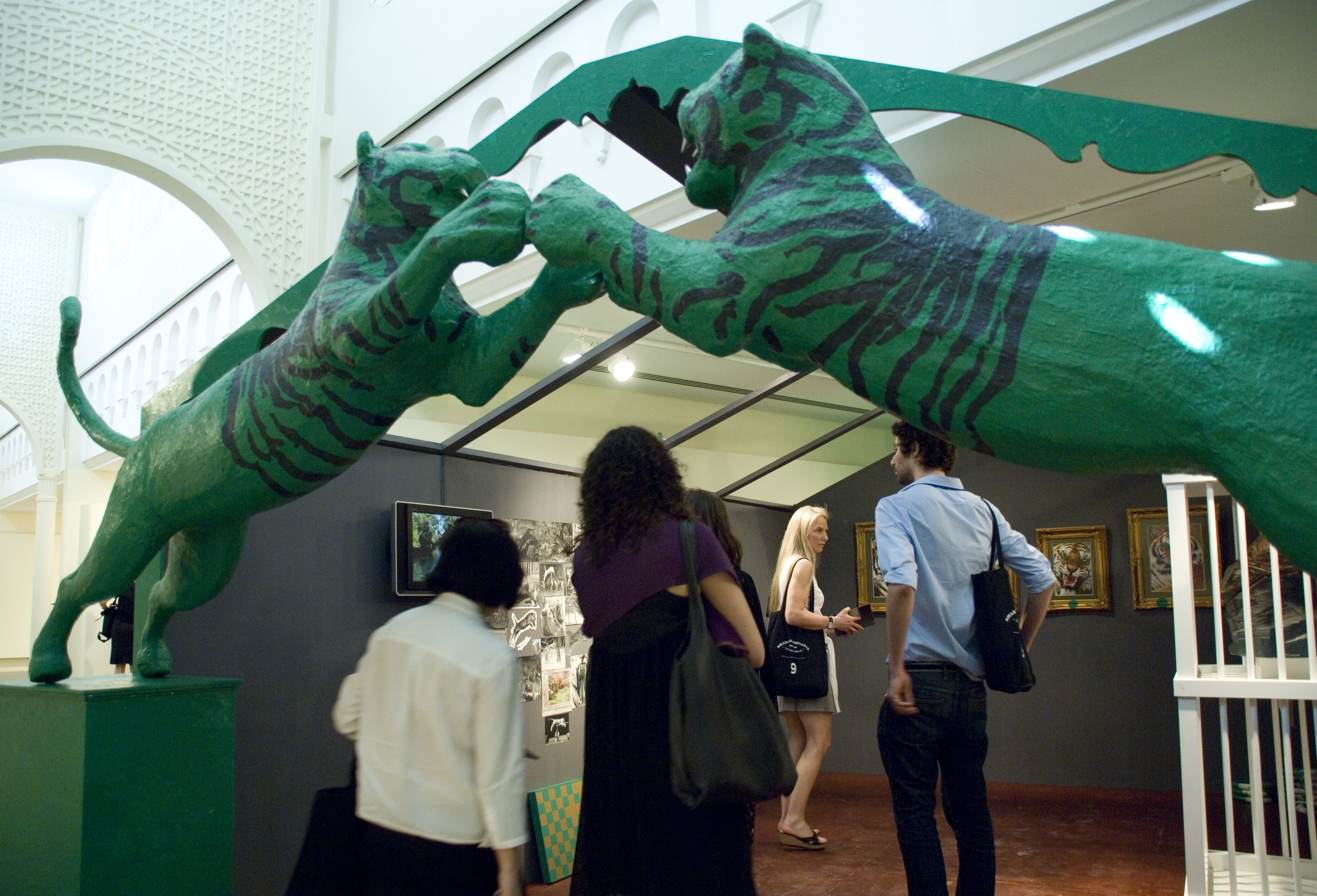
"Halcyon Tarp", installation by Firoz Mahmud at Sharjah Biennial in 2009

Mahmud exhibited large scale art projects or art series at several art biennale and triennial exhibitions, including 1st Bangkok Art Biennale, 1st Lahore Biennial, Dhaka Art Summit, Sharjah Biennale, Cairo Biennale, Asian Biennale, Setouchi Triennale art festival, 1st Aichi Triennial, and Echigo-Tsumari Art Triennial.

Mahmud has exhibited at the Hunter East Harlem Gallery, New York, Artens Xouth Art Festival in Athens, Greece, Emery Community Arts Center [UMF] in Maine, Kresge Gallery of Lyon College in AR, COAL PRIZE Art project screening at the Pompidou Center in Paris, IFEMA Feria de Madrid in Spain, Asia Art Initiative in Philadelphia, Sharjah Art Foundation in Sharjah, UAE, Berkshire Art Museum in Massachusetts, Children's Museum in Manhattan, New York, and the Office of Contemporary Art (OCA) Oslo, Norway.

=== Photo based artwork ===
In 2017, the Soaked Dream photograph series was exhibited at Against Competition/Towards Mutual Aid in New York by ABC No RIO at Flux Factory. His recent projects on refugee families and displaced people were exhibited at Bangkok Art Biennale in 2018 and Sharjah Art Foundation in UAE.

== Exhibitions ==
Mahmud has exhibited works from this art project in Asia, Europe, the Americas, and Africa. Locations and exhibitions include:

- MAXXI (National Museum of 21st Century Arts), Rome, Italy
- Children's Museum of Manhattan, Manhattan, New York, United States
- Lahore Biennial, Lahore, Pakistan
- Sharjah Art Foundation, Sharjah, UAE
- IFEMA Feria de Madrid, Madrid, Spain
- Dhaka Art Summit, Dhaka, Bangladesh, 2014
- Office for Contemporary Art, Oslo, Norway, 2016
- ABC No Rio in Exile, ABC No Rio, Flux Factory, Queens, New York, United States, 2017
- 1st Bangkok Art Biennale, Bangkok, Thailand, 2018
- 2019 United Nations Climate Change Conference (COP25)
- Pompidou Center (short-listed for the Coal Art Prize), Paris, France, 2019
- Emery Community Arts Center, University of Maine at Farmington, Farmington, Maine, 2020

== Media ==
Art Asia Pacific magazine published an article 'Garden of Historical Delights' on Mahmud's solo exhibition held at Ota Fine Arts in Singapore. Hong Kong based art design and lifestyle magazine COBO published an article on Mahmud's exhibition titled 'Firoz Mahmud: Delineating Colonialism of Bengal Presidency', written by Selima Quader Chowdhury which was published in January 2019. In 2013, Asia Society in Hong Kong invited him to a symposium 'Continuous Horizons: Contemporary Art for Asia, No Country: Contemporary Art for South and Southeast Asia Programs' co-organized by the Solomon R. Guggenheim Museum.

Mahmud was featured in Japan Times and DNP magazine written by Lucy Birmingham. He exhibited his solo exhibition "Loss of the Toss is Blessing of Their Disguise," on NinKi:Urgency of Proximate Drawing at Dhaka Art Center in 2013. The Daily Star featured his ongoing (primarily anonymous) NinKi: Urgency of Proximate Drawing photograph when he had a solo exhibition at Dhaka Art Center.
