= Olujimi =

Olújìmí
- Gender: Male
- Language: Yoruba

Origin
- Origin: Nigerian
- Meaning: The Lord entrusts me.
- Region of origin: South West, Nigeria

Olújìmí is a Nigerian given name and a surname. It is a male name and of Yoruba origin, which means "The Lord entrusts me". Olújìmí is a diminutive form of Yoruba names like "Lújìnmí, Jìmi and Jìnmí" same meaning but in shorter forms with Yoruba phonetic reduction. Other full forms of the name include "Fọlá-jìnmi/Fọlá-jìmi" means (Entrust me with Wealth), "Fadé-jìnmi/Fadé-jìmi" (Entrust me with Royalty) etc.

== Given name ==
- Jimi Agbaje (Olujimi Kolawole Agbaje; born 1957), Nigerian pharmacist and politician

== Surname ==
- Abiodun Olujimi (born 1958), Nigerian politician
- Kambui Olujimi (born 1976), American visual artist
- Ladipo Akinkugbe (Oladipo Olujimi Akinkugbe; 1933–2020), Nigerian professor
