= NinKi: Urgency of Proximate Drawing Photograph =

Art project

NinKi: Urgency of Proximate Drawing Photograph (NinKi:UoPDP)
- Products: Proximate Drawing Photos
- Location: Tokyo, Japan
- Owner: Firoz Mahmud
- Founder: Firoz Mahmud
- Established: 2008
- Funding: 2008
- Website: http://urgency-of-proximate-drawing-ninki.blogspot.com/

The NinKi: Urgency of Proximate Drawing Photograph (NinKi:UoPDP) was initiated by Bangladeshi visual artist Firoz Mahmud ( ফিরোজ মাহমুদ, フィロズ・マハムド ). This is a drawing photograph project to rhetorically rescue popular icons with geometric structure drawings or make photo image of the people tactically static. His pigeonhole or kind of compartmental examples of doodling were engaged on found images in various printed media and also were found in his sketchbook, books, notebooks and often in his borrowed books. The word 'Ninki' (人気) is a Japanese word which means be Popular or popularity. The Ninki: UoPDP art Project of drawing on photographs consist of numerous archetypal images of popular celebrities in vague appearance. Their career, character, fame, obscurity, activities and character are insurgent and idiosyncratic. Artist Firoz has started on any image and then specifically on Bengal tiger and more significantly on Japanese Sumo Wrestler as artist based in Japan and fascinated by sports, media and interested on humorous aspect of entertainment industries.

== About ==
The `Urgency of Proximate Drawing Photograph` (NinKi:UoPDP) is Firoz Mahmud`s one of art projects, started as anonymously. Gradually with the requests of curators and many of his friends, he started to exhibit in public spaces and major art venues. It was initially created for changing the meaning of visual images from the original photo images which Firoz took, collected or found to experiment that how general people react seeing each one's popular icons.

== History ==
From the inception when Firoz Mahmud exposed these drawing photographs, he focused anonymously without using his name at billboards, undergrounds, signage board or in other exhibition venues in Japan. He created this on-going art project in Tokyo since 2008 as his leisure time drawing doodle on newspapers, magazines, and found images. NinKi: Urgency of Proximate Drawing was first exhibited at the 9th Sharjah Art Biennial in 2009 in Sharjah, UAE. Gradually he exhibited in Museums, galleries and art spaces.Gradually with the requests of curators and many of his friends, he started to exhibit in public spaces and major art venues. One of his first projects of 'Urgency of Proximate Drawing' was exhibited as 'Rescued Stardom' project at the Hiroshima City Museum of Contemporary Art in Hiroshima Japan where he received a prize.

== Topic of the project and style ==
Firoz focuses on celebrities in excited, playful, sporty and happy moments. He draws lines where they are about to fall or feel hard to gesture in the photographs. Their idolized appearances are highlighted by protective line drawings that display an awareness of the per-formative ethos of iconic expression. The lines underneath the falling position imply that the stardom can't fall down from the gestures and positions that they are held in.

== Reviews, Comments and Quotes ==
The project The NinKi: Urgency of Proximate Drawing Photograph has been featured in many newspapers and magazines. Many critics, artists and art specialists commented on Firoz's NinKi art project, for example: `Through a very unique point of view, Firoz focuses on a moment of people’s lives. Although his method is very simple, it reconstructs the space in a very strong way. His works give viewers a lot of excitement. ``- Ozawa Tsuyoshi, Artist based in Japan New York City & Dhaka based writer & artist Naeem Mohaiemen wrote on his reviews in Depart art Magazine that, - "Firoz's announced plan is to rescue icons from detritus, but something sinister is at play in these brutalist lines. The crazy cat's cradle across a former pugilist's face, a flesh-eating phantasm in its pre-animation wireframe, is channeling Tyson's unmoored, chaotic, fractured id.

" Firoz has artfully and humorously explored social and emotive issues through his "NINKi :UoPDP" Urgency of Proximate Drawings. I am surprised how he magically rescued the perturbed stars during their danger situation in the photographs. The drawing structures are drawn with geometric patterns that appear like protective hex symbols. All celebrities can eventually remain invincible in their popularity, protected by an uncanny force." - Lucy Birmingham is an American critic and journalist based in Tokyo, but her articles appeared in Japan Times, Time.com, Wall Street Journal, ARTFORUM Magazine, Artinfo.com, Artforum.com, ARTnews.

== Exhibition ==
- Exhibit 320, Part of `NinKi, Legacies Run over the Yamuna` New Delhi, India, 2015
- Dhaka Art center, Dhaka, 2013, `Loss of the Toss is Blessing of Their Disguise` September, 2013.
- "STEP ACROSS THIS LINE", Contemporary Art from Bangladesh, India and Pakistan at Asia House, London 10–22 October 2011
- New York City Subways and Billboards project, New York City, May~ September, 2011
- International studio and Curatorial Program [ISCP], May 2011
- New York City, Underground and public spaces, 2011, `I buy, you frame-10% taxand 100% discount-Firoz Mahmud`s NinKI: UoPD (Urgency of Proximate Drawing is on SALE)`
- Hiroshima, Hiroshima Museum of Contemporary Art, 2009, `Rescued Stardom` (Art Project Ideas with prize)
- Bandung, Indonesia, 2010, Asbestos Art Space & City public space,`Whatever They are Scolded Your Star is Safe`
- Tokyo, Undergrounds NinKi:UoPD project,`Loss of the Toss is Blessing of Their Disguise`, 2010
- Tokyo, Japan, B.A.D. Museum of Contemporary Art Yuga Gallery, Tokyo University of the Arts, 2010, `Yatta ! Anzen ! `
- UAE, Sharjah Biennale 2009, Sharjah,`RRR (Ralley Round Rajah) at Halcyon Tarp Project
- Niigata, Echigo-Tsumari Art Triennale (Conquering Snow Dynamo Art Project/ CAP-Crystal Art Project) Japan, 2009
- Tokyo, The University of the Arts, 2008

== Awards ==
- NinKi: Urgency of Proximate Drawing project was awarded a prize from the Hiroshima City Museum of Contemporary Art, Hiroshima for Art Project Ideas in 2009.
- Osaka Center for Contemporary Art in Osaka awarded him as one of four shortlisted for Jiro Ishihara Memorial Art Prize.
- Book was published on NinKi: Urgency of Proximate Drawing in 2011.
