= David Spriggs =

David Spriggs may refer to:

- David Spriggs (footballer)
- David Spriggs (artist)
