= The Court (song) =

Single by Peter Gabriel

from the album I/O
- Released: 5 February 2023 (dark-side mix); 20 February 2023 (bright-side and in-side mixes)
- Studio: Real World (Wiltshire); The Beehive (London); British Grove (London)
- Length: 4:20
- Label: Real World; EMI (UK/Japan); Republic (United States/Canada)
- Songwriter: Peter Gabriel
- Producer: Peter Gabriel

Peter Gabriel singles chronology
"Panopticom" (2023)	"The Court" (2023)	"Playing for Time" (2023)

"The Court" is a song by English musician Peter Gabriel. A version of the song mixed by Tchad Blake, titled the "Dark-Side Mix", was released on 5 February 2023. It was the second single released from I/O and reached number 59 on the UK Singles Downloads Chart. Much like "Panopticom", the single's release date was chosen to coincide with a full moon. Versions of the song entitled the "Bright-Side Mix" (done by Mark "Spike" Stent) and the "In-Side Mix" (completed by Hans-Martin Buff) were later released.

== Background ==
The song's "free-form, impressionistic lyric that connected to justice" concerns the balance between the necessity of the legal system and the abuse of power that happens within it. He said that the song was a commentary of the justice system and how its functionality is enhanced in countries with minimal corruption. "The Court" was partially inspired by the work of NAMATI, a charity "dedicated to putting the power of law in the hands of people."

"The Court" began with a Cuban loop, after which Gabriel added some improvised double-tracked vocals and some keyboard ideas, including some piano accents for the verses. He constructed the verses around a single chord and originally included drums and percussion on the chorus, although these were later removed. Gabriel expressed his belief that the song "started coming together when I muted everything on the choruses."

Over 150 tracks were required to complete the song; for certain instruments on the dark-side mix, Blake panned the delay to the right channel and applied reverb to the left channel. He also used a Space Echo plug-in to spread some of the audio across both channels. The signal chain for the vocals on the dark-side mix included Pensado and MEQ-5 equalizer plug-ins, the latter of which was recommended to Blake by Gabriel. John Metcalfe and Gabriel developed the song's orchestral arrangements, which were recorded at British Grove Studios using many members from the New Blood Orchestra.

== Artwork ==
The single's cover art features the photograph "Lifting the Curse" by Tim Shaw, who created the artwork as a response to a "curse" placed by artists Gilbert & George on the Royal Academy of Arts after the institution refused to showcase their work. Gabriel commented that "This particular image has an unusual story attached, but I just responded to the photograph of this very strange figure that was being ritualistically burnt. The story behind it, I only discovered afterwards." The artwork also references the 2022 Russian invasion of Ukraine. "Lifting the Curse" was sold at the Médecins Sans Frontières (MSF) Artist Fundraiser Auction in 2024 to raise money for relief efforts in Gaza and the West Bank.

== Music video ==
For the song's music video, Gabriel worked with Stability AI to launch the Diffuse Together competition allowing people to submit AI visuals that would accompany the audio of "The Court". The winner of this competition was Junie Lau, a director and production designer whose work has been featured in British Vogue. Lau utilized several AI tools, including Stable Diffusion, DreamStudio, Kaiber, Deforum, ChatGPT, Midjourney, and Dalle-2 to create the music video.

== Critical reception ==
Writing for The Guardian, Alexis Petridis described "The Court" as a song that "explores the effect of the internet on public discourse." Helen Brown of The Independent said that the song was "driven by speaker-rattling tin can percussion" and said that the "tumbling piano towards the song's end has a lovely Tori Amos vibe." She felt that the song's bridge was "a little am-dram", but said that it was "fun to hear Gabriel’s accusatory whisper again".

== Personnel ==
- Peter Gabriel – lead vocals, backing vocals, piano, synthesizer, rhythm programming, orchestral arrangement
- Manu Katché – drums
- Tony Levin – bass guitar
- David Rhodes – guitar, backing vocals
- Brian Eno – synthesizer, percussion
- Katie May – percussion
- Melanie Gabriel – backing vocals
- Richard Chapell – rhythm programming

Orchestra

- Orchestral arrangement and conducting: John Metcalfe
- Orchestra leader: Everton Nelson
- Violins: Natalia Bonner, Martin Burgess, Louisa Fuller, Richard George, Clare Hayes, Marianne Haynes, Ian Humphries, Charles Mutter, Everton Nelson, Odile Ollagnon, Cathy Thompson, Debbie Widdup
- Violas: Fiona Bonds, Peter Lale, Rachel Roberts, Bruce White
- Cellos: Chris Allen, Ian Burdge, Caroline Dale, William Shofield, Tony Woolard, Chris Worsey
- Double bass: Chris Laurence, Lucy Shaw, Stacey Watton
- Flute: Eliza Marshall
- Trumpet: Andrew Crowley
- Bass trombone: Richard Henry
- Tenor trombone: Tracy Holloway, Andy Wood
- Euphonium: Andy Wood
- Tuba: David Powell

== Charts ==
Chart performance for "The Court"
Chart (2023)	Peak position
UK Singles Downloads (Official Charts)	59
