= Kalba Ice Factory =

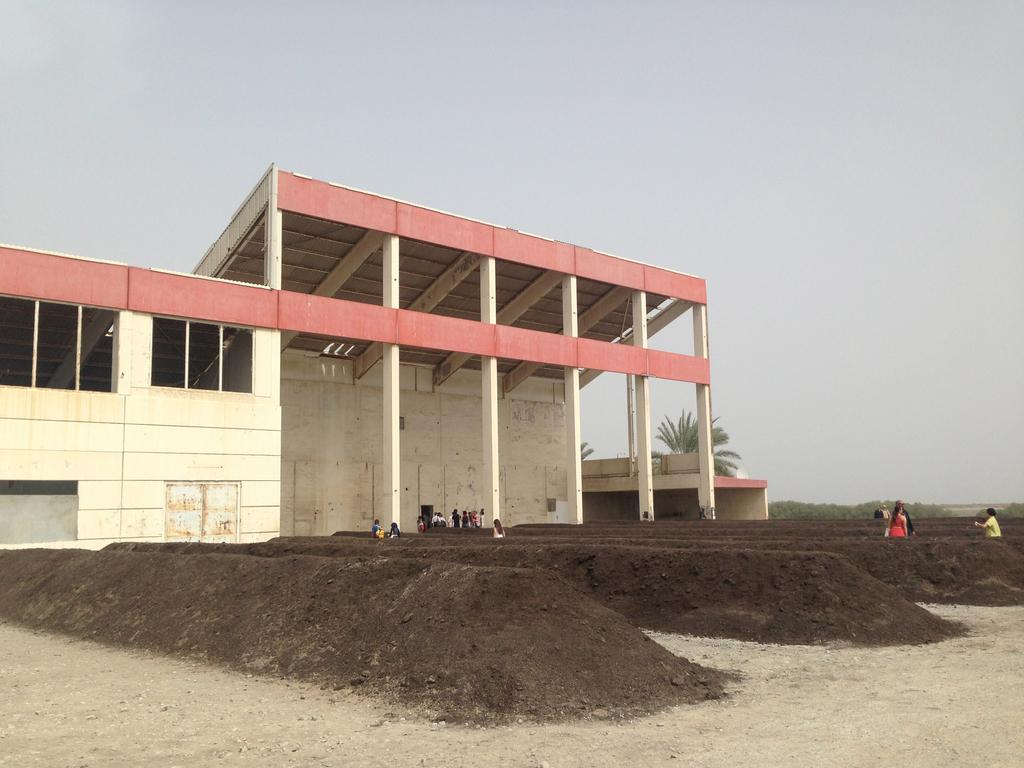
Kalba Ice Factory prior to its 2020-2023 renovation.

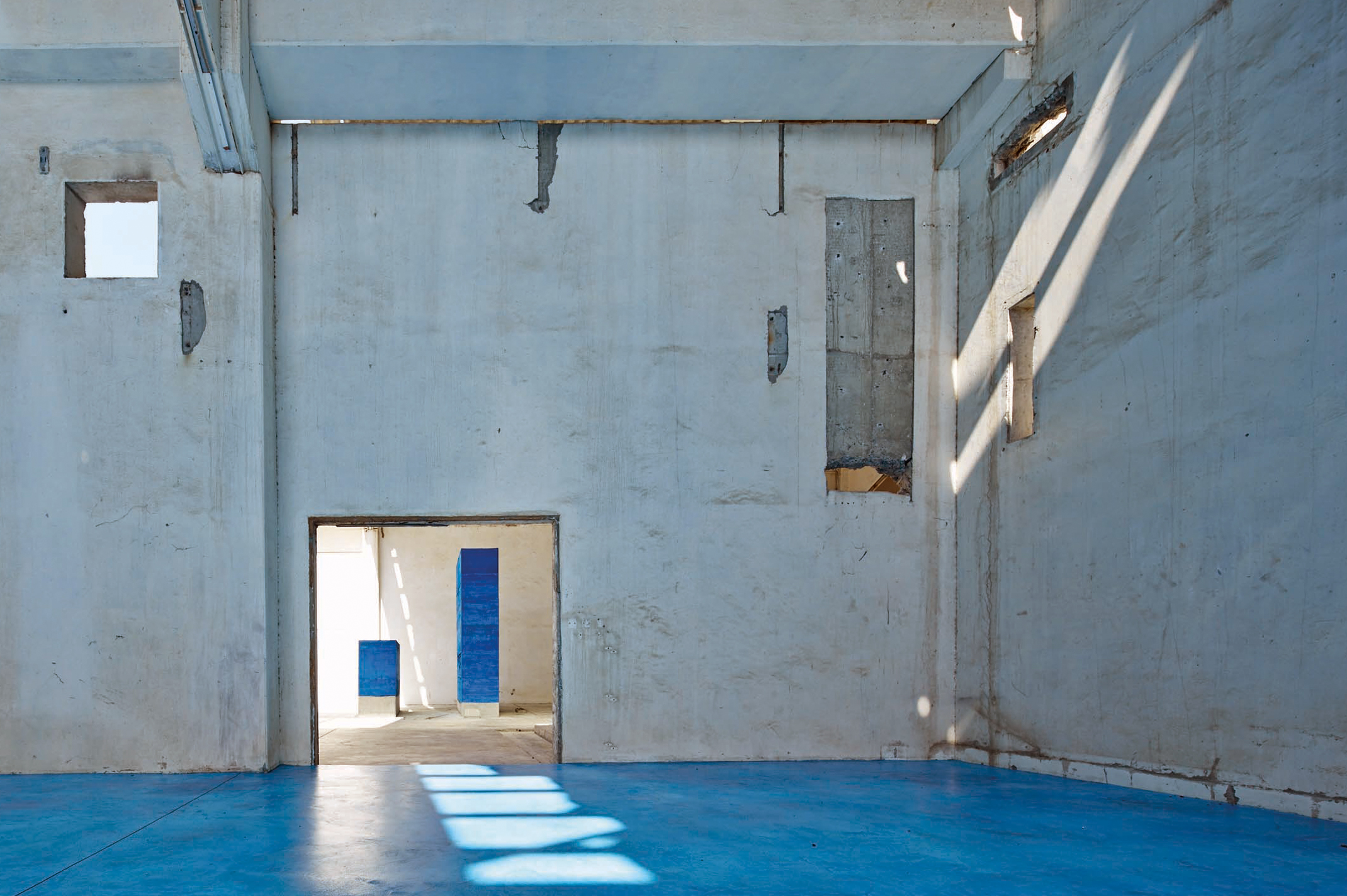
Interior of Kalba Ice Factory prior to renovation.

Kalba Ice Factory is a gallery and art space in Kalba, Sharjah, a city on the East Coast of the United Arab Emirates. The 20,000 square-metre building was constructed by renovating a derelict feed mill and ice factory. It was opened to the public on 8 February 2023, the opening timed to house Sharjah Biennial 15.

== Origin ==
Kalba Ice Factory was originally constructed in the 1970s as a fish feed mill and then used as an ice production and storage facility by local fishermen, allowing fish caught on Kalba's extensive coastline to be transported to Dubai for sale. It fell into dereliction until the shell of the building was bought by Sharjah Art Foundation in 2015.

The development of the ice factory includes a series of six apartments, social spaces and a 200 square-metre workshop as well as a branch of the Foundation's Fen Café. Inaugurated by the ruler of Sharjah, Dr Sultan Al Qasimi, it has since been called 'a testament to the power of adaptive reuse and preservation.'

== Biennial ==
The Ice Factory was used as an informal venue for two previous Sharjah Biennial events, an exhibition by Argentinian sculptor Adrian Villar Rojas titled Planetarium during Biennial 12 in 2015, and a 2019 performance by South African film maker Mohau Modisakeng, Land of Zanj, during Sharjah Biennial 14. Sharjah Art Foundation commissioned Peruvian architects 51-1 Arquitectos in 2017 to refurbish the derelict buildings as a permanent art space and construction started in 2020.

== Location ==
Kalba Ice Factory is situated by Khor Kalba (Kalba Creek) and overlooks the Al Qurm Nature Reserve, a mangrove and wildlife sanctuary that is an important area of biodiversity and home to endangered species including the Arabian-Collared Kingfisher, the Blandford's lizard and endangered hawksbill and green turtles which nest on the nearby beach.

The Kalba Ice Factory project is one of a number of 1970s and '80s buildings under restoration by Sharjah Art Foundation and the Sharjah Architecture Triennial, including the Flying Saucer; the Jubail Vegetable Market; the 1970s Khor Fakkan Cinema, being redeveloped as a music school, and a pyramid-roofed kindergarten, being made into a community centre.
