= Panopticom =

Single by Peter Gabriel

from the album I/O
- Released: 6 January 2023 (bright-side mix); 21 January 2023 (dark-side); 28 January 2023 (in-side mix)
- Studio: Real World (Wiltshire); The Beehive (London)
- Genre: Progressive pop; art rock
- Length: 5:13
- Label: Real World; EMI (UK/Japan); Republic (United States/Canada)
- Songwriter: Peter Gabriel
- Producer: Peter Gabriel

Peter Gabriel singles chronology
"Here It Is" (2022)	"Panopticom" (2023)	"The Court" (2023)

"Panopticom" is a song by English musician Peter Gabriel, released in January 2023 as the first single in promotion of his tenth studio album I/O, his first album of original material since 2002's Up. Three versions of the song have been released: the "Bright Side Mix" (mixed by Mark "Spike" Stent) on 6 January 2023, the "Dark Side Mix" (mixed by Tchad Blake) on 21 January, and an "In-Side Mix" (mixed by Hans-Martin Buff) on 28 January. The cover (for both versions) features David Spriggs' Red Gravity as the cover art. The single was released on the first full moon of the year.

Additional tracks from the album were also released on full moons and received "bright side", "dark side", and "in-side" mixes by Stent, Blake, and Buff respectively. Gabriel also performed the song during his I/O The Tour in 2023.

== Background ==
On the origin of "Panopticom", Gabriel said that the song was centered around the idea of an "infinitely expandable accessible data globe: the Panopticom", where the intention was to "connect a like-minded group of people who might be able to bring this to life, to allow the world to see itself better and understand more of what's really going on." Additionally, Gabriel cited research group Forensic Architecture, investigative journalism group Bellingcat, and the non-profit human rights organization WITNESS (co-founded by Gabriel) as inspirations.

The song's title references the panopticon, a prison structure designed by Jeremy Bentham that enabled prison guards to observe the actions of all of prisoners without being detected. Gabriel's concept of the panopticom was to invert this model by enabling "ordinary people" to observe the actions of authority figures. The "com" in the panopticom refers to the ability for people to "communicate both to the globe and what's going on in the globe. It's turning surveillance on its head."

The idea for the Panopticom, an ever-expanding data globe that will allow ordinary people to make permanent records of their own experiences and observe those in power, is about using existing surveillance systems to benefit everybody.

Musically, the song began with the sound of a bouzouki, over which some improvised vocals were overdubbed. Following the addition of a rhythmic pattern, Gabriel worked with Oli Jacobs to develop the track further. A band session was arranged in September 2021, which featured David Rhodes on guitar, Tony Levin on bass, Manu Katché on drums, Jacobs on programming, and Gabriel on synths and vocals. Gabriel then asked Brian Eno assist him on the album, who contributed some electronic elements to "Panopticom", credited as "bells and haunting synths".

Near the end of the recording process, Ríoghnach Connolly sang some backing vocals, although Gabriel said that her parts were "not very audible" in the mix. The song's Bright-Side Mix features more prominent acoustic guitars than the Dark-Side mix, created by Mark "Spike" Stent and Tchad Blake respectively.

== In-Side mix ==
Hans-Martin Buff handled the In-Side mix for "Panopticom" using Dolby Atmos. "Panopticom" was the first mix that Buff worked on for Gabriel's I/O album; he worked on the album's first three tracks in sequential order. On the In-Side mix of "Panopticom", Buff wanted to add new instruments to capitalize on the capabilities offered by Dolby Atmos. Buff believed that the two guitars found on the stereo mixes of "Panopticom" were insufficient for the In-Side mix, so with Gabriel's approval, Buff brought Stuart McCaullum into the recording studio to overdub additional guitars. McCaullum and Connolly had previously played together in The Breath, a band signed to Real World Records. Buff viewed his role as ensuring that Gabriel's musical intentions were fully realised with the In-Side mixes and cited his mix of "Panopticom" as an example of this being achieved.

The easiest example of this I can think of is in the first song that was released, "Panopticom." It starts with these spacey moving bursts, which work nicely in Atmos because you have the expanded environment and the ability to create spaces. Then, it all of a sudden comes into focus with this pre-chorus of his vocal and some acoustic guitars.

— Hans-Martin Buff

On 28 January 2023, the In-Side mix of "Panopticom" was released on Apple Music and Amazon Music. These platforms required a link to a stereo version, but since the In-Side mix was not recorded in stereo, the Dark-Side mix was linked to the song instead.

== Artwork ==
The cover artwork features Red Gravity by David Spriggs, who created the piece in 2021 with acrylic paint on layered plexiglass with dimensions of 84 × 61 × 20 cm. The artwork consists of a red vortex with a black hole in the center. Gabriel commented that the artwork reflected "Panopticom's" lyrical themes of surveillance, which prompted him to reach out to Spriggs for permission to use Red Gravity for the cover art. Red Gravity was also used as a backdrop for live performances of "Panopticom" during Gabriel's i/o tour.

== Music videos ==
Several official music videos were released for "Panopticom", all of which were made with artificial intelligence. In April 2023, Gabriel and Stability AI launched the #DiffuseTogether competition for people to create music videos with artificial intelligence to accompany the music of one of Gabriel's songs from his I/O album. One of the joint-winners from the competition was Lamson, an engineer from Vietnam who used Stable Diffusion for their music video, which used the audio from the Dark-Side Mix of "Panopticom". A different music video using the same mix was created by Stephen Grzanowski under the alias Vnderworld with the Stable Diffusion with the Deforum plug-in over the course of one week. Their music video placed second in the #DiffuseTogether competition. Another music video was created by Dominic DeJoseph using the audio from the song's Bright-Side Mix.

== Critical reception ==
Steve Erickson of Slant Magazine characterised "Panopticom" as a song that "confronts our surveillance culture, its title referring to the ability to observe a world where facts are difficult to determine." He also indicated his preference for the Bright-Side mix over the Dark-Side mix, calling the former a "more potent version of the song." In his review of i/o, Chris Roberts highlighted the song's themes of surveillance and Gabriel's "hushed but crystal-clear diction. Writing for Uncut, John Lewis compared the song's production to some of Gabriel's earlier work, including on "Intruder" and "No Self Control". Helen Brown of The Independent highlighted the song's "rolling bass lines" that she said that recalled Gabriel's 1992 song "Digging in the Dirt". Writing for The Guardian, Alexis Petridis described it as "a kind of jingle, albeit a luxuriously-appointed one" for Gabriel's idea of a "universally accessible data globe".

== Personnel ==
- Peter Gabriel – lead and backing vocals, synthesizers, rhythm programming, production
- Tony Levin – bass guitar
- David Rhodes – electric guitar, backing vocals
- Manu Katché – drums
- Brian Eno – haunting synths, bells
- Katie May – acoustic guitar
- Richard Chappell – rhythm programming
- Oli Jacobs – rhythm programming, synthesizers
- Ríoghnach Connolly – backing vocals

== Charts ==
Chart performance for "Panopticom"
Chart (2023)	Peak position
Canadian Digital Song Sales (Billboard)	45
UK Singles Downloads (Official Charts)	19
US Rock Digital Songs (Billboard)	12
