= Nil Yalter =

Turkish artist (born 1938)

- Born: January 15, 1938 (age 88); Cairo, Egypt
- Education: Rutgers University Institute for Women and Art
- Known for: contemporary feminist artist
- Movement: French counterculture and revolutionary movements

Nil Yalter (born 1938) is a Turkish contemporary feminist artist. She attended Robert College in Istanbul, Turkey. Her work is included in many collections and museums, which includes drawings, photographs, videos, and performance art. She is the first Turkish female video artist.

== Early life ==
Nil Yalter was born in 1938 in Cairo, Egypt, where she lived until the age of four. She is Turkish and later in her life became also a French national. She received her education from Robert College in Istanbul, Turkey. She started painting at an early age and took dance and ballet classes. In 1956, she traveled to India on foot while practicing pantomime. She had her first exhibition of paintings inspired by this travel at the French Cultural Institute in Mumbai (Bombay) in 1957. Between 1963 and 1964 she worked as stage and costume designer for theatre companies in Istanbul. In 1963, she participated at the 3rd Paris Biennale with abstract compositions under the curatorship of Nurullah Berk. She moved to Paris in 1965, after she became politically involved with sociological topics, specifically focusing migration and women. Her poster exhibition, that has been hung around the world, was subject to criticism. The poster writes ″Şu Gurbetlik Zor Zanaat Zor″ in Turkish which has been translated as ″Exile is hard work″, aims to raise awareness of the situation of people in exile. However, "gurbetlik" does not mean "exile", but rather someone living in a different country than their own.

== Early career ==
Yalter moved to Paris in 1965 and took part in the French counterculture and revolutionary movements which prompted her to move away from abstract constructivist painting to start working with the medium of video and to use her own body. In the 1970s, she led the beginning of the French feminist art movement. In 1973, Yalter created an installation inspired by the temporary dwelling structures of Turkic nomads titled Topak Ev, a nomad's tent as a study of private, public and feminine spaces at A.R.C. Musée d'Art Moderne de la Ville de Paris. Topak Ev marked the beginning of Yalter's use of sociological and ethnographic methods in her work. While the installation was based on research conducted around Niğde on nomadic tents, the exhibition also included panels gathering drawings, collages, photographs and handwritten descriptions on the structure and dimensions of nomadic tents, materials used in their making and decorative elements. In 1974, she benefited from an artist residency at Cité internationale des arts, in Paris. That same year, she created a video titled The Headless Woman (The Belly Dance), a piece that stands out in French contemporary art history as one of the early feminist-art classics. The video frames the artist's belly as she writes a text on around her navel. The text is an excerpt from René Nelli's Erotique et Civilisations (1972) and states that "a woman's sexuality is both convex and concave", emphasizing the vaginal and clitoral orgasmic potentials of women. Yalter then "activates" the text by belly dancing, the gyrations of her belly animate the letters. The work is emblematic of some of the formal gestures and critical strategies Yalter developed in the coming years: creating a reversal of the male gaze by objectifying her own body through the camera, Yalter refers to women's sexual liberation from patriarchal control, while at the same time commenting on the Orientalist eroticization of Middle Eastern women in Western art.

Throughout the 1970s and 1980s, Yalter created a series of works combining her interest in gender issues and feminism with a focus on marginalized communities such as migrant workers in Europe and former prisoners. Temporary Dwellings, first exhibited in Grenoble, France, in 1977 investigates the living conditions and experiences of migrant workers as told by women. A video installation created in collaboration with Judy Blum and Nicole Croizet in 1974, La Roquette, Prison de Femmes reconstructs the living conditions in the Roquette women's prison in Paris with a video and series of photographs and drawings based on former inmate Mimi's memories related to daily rites and objects describing the experience of a panoptical space.

Yalter was a member of several collectives of female artists in Paris in the 1970s, such as Femmes en Lutte and Femmes/Art which gathered around socially engaged practices and the women's struggle for visibility in the arts. From 1980 to 1995, Yalter acted as an associate at Sorbonne University.

== Later career ==
In the 1990s, with the advent of digital technologies, Nil Yalter developed her video practice by using 3D animation techniques and electronic sound editing. Multiplying the image and its surface by way of geometrical shapes, this use of digital techniques operates interruptions within the image and opens up a space for intertextuality in her video works. Most emblematic of this process is Pixelismus (1996) which took the form of an interactive CD-ROM. The work is an investigation of the relationship between Byzantine mosaics and pixels, inspired by the writings of Malevitch on modernism.

In 2007 Nil Yalter participated in the traveling survey exhibition WACK! Art and the Feminist Revolution organized by Cornelia Butler with La Roquette, Prison de Femmes. The exhibition brought wider international exposure to Yalter's work, and she has enjoyed a large number of solo exhibitions since then. In 2016, she had two retrospectives, "Off The Record" at Arter, Istanbul and "Nil Yalter", Frac Lorraine, Metz, and a monographic exhibition at La Verriere - Fondation Hermes, Brussels, followed by "D'apres Stimmung" in 2017 at Ludwig Museum, Cologne. In 2018, she was the recipient of "Outstanding Merit Award" AWARE 2018.

Her most recent works produced between 2015 and 2018 were exhibited at her solo exhibition Kara Kum at Galerist, Istanbul in March–April 2018.

In November 2023, she was awarded the Golden Lion for lifetime achievement by the Venice Biennale for her oeuvre. Her work will be celebrated at the 60th edition of the biennale, during the opening ceremony on April 20, 2024.

== Collections ==
Nil Yalter's works are held in the permanent collections of Tate Modern, İstanbul Modern, Centre Georges Pompidou, Fonds national d'art contemporain, Ludwig Museum, Long Beach Museum, Aksanat, Koç Contemporary, Reydan Weiss Collection, Deutsche Telekom Art Collection, Foto Colectania Foundation, Coleccion Olorvisual and Sammlung Verbund.

== Exhibitions ==
Nil Yalter has participated at important international exhibitions such as the 15th Sharjah Biennial (2023), 12th Berlin Biennale (2022), 10th Gwangju Biennale (2014), the 13th Istanbul Biennale (2013), 10th Paris Biennale (1977) and traveling survey exhibitions such as WACK! Art and the Feminist Revolution (Los Angeles Museum of Contemporary Art; PS1 MoMa New York; Contemporary Art Center Vancouver 2007-2008), elles@centrepompidou (Centre Pompidou Paris; Centro Cultural Banco de Brazil, Rio de Janeiro; Seattle Art Museum 2013) and Desire for Freedom (Deutsches Historisches Museum, Berlin; Palazzo Reale, Milano; Eesti Kunstimuuseum – Kumu Kunstimuuseum, Tallinn; Muzeum Sztuki Wspólczesnej MOCAK, Krakau 2013).

In recent years her work has been shown at: Museum of Modern Art, New York (2022), Museum Ludwig, Cologne (2019), WIELS, Brussels (2017), Clark House Initiative / Kadist Art Foundation, Mumbai (2014); Museum of Modern Art Rio de Janeiro (2014); SALT Istanbul (2013); Museum Boijmans Van Beuningen Rotterdam (2012); Centro Cultural Belem Lisbon (2010); Akademie der Kunst Berlin (2009).

In 2019, Fabienne Dumont co-curated a retrospective at the MAC VAL and edited two books: Nil Yalter - Where the memories of migrants, feminists and workers meet mythology (Vitry-sur-Seine, MAC VAL, 2019) and Nil Yalter - Interview with Fabienne Dumont (Paris, Manuella Editions, 2019).
