= Random International =

Random International is a London-based art collective and collaborative studio, founded in 2005. The group shot to prominence with its interactive Rain Room art installation. Its work includes sculpture, performance and large-scale architectural installations. Two of its exhibition pieces have now become permanent installations, the first of which was the critically acclaimed and popular Rain Room, now permanently housed in Sharjah, United Arab Emirates (UAE).

The group was founded in 2005 by German artists Hannes Koch and Florian Ortkrass. Ortkrass graduated from the Royal College of Art in London in 2005, while Koch graduated in 2004. Its experimentation with digital technologies has led to collaborations with Harvard roboticists on creating 'point studies' that reduce representation of the human form in motion into 15 light points, as well as with architects to create large scale public displays that include covering a German train station with LED lights.

== Rain Room ==
Rain Room, now installed in Sharjah, United Arab Emirates, was the first installation of a Random International project in a purpose-built, permanent structure. The work was previously shown at the Barbican, London (2012); MoMA, New York (2013); Yuz Museum, Shanghai (2015) and LACMA, Los Angeles (2015–2017). Rain Room allows visitors to the installation to walk through a downpour without getting wet. Motion sensors detect visitors' movements as they navigate through the darkened space, becoming "performers in this intersection of art, technology and nature". The work has been a celebrated Instagram theme: the photo and video sharing platform has been cited as a major source of Random International's popular recognition.

In 2015, billionaire Budi Tek, Yuz Museum's founder, announced he would build a 150 square metre Rain Room in Bali. The plan was shelved due to Tek's ill-health.

A number of Chinese companies have copied the Rain Room concept and, in 2016, the Chinese Jiajiale Dream Park opened its $15 million Rain Room clone called the Magic Rain Zone. One company offers as many as 12 clones of the installation. Koch estimated that as many as 8-10 companies had produced Rain Room clones.

== Instant Structure for Schacht XII ==
The group's first outdoor installation was Tower: Instant Structure for Schacht XII, created for Urbane Künste Ruhr for the Ruhrtriennale 2013. The work cycled 30,000 litres of water per minute from the former coal mines of Zollverin, a World Heritage site, to create an instantaneous towering structure of water. The mines pump millions of water out each year to maintain the surrounding area's structural integrity.

== Self & Other ==
The first permanent installation in the UK for Random International, Self & Other, is located on the South Bank arts and cultural area of the Albert Embankment. It was launched in July 2018.

== Swarm Studies ==
A series of works based on LED walls that mimic the flocking behavior of birds, fish, and insects, Random International's Swarm Studies have been created ranging from a small version, Swarm Study / XI, at the Park Hyatt New York's restaurant Bevy, to the huge Swarm Study / IX, which spans the entire façade of the train station in Chemnitz, Germany—the group's largest installation at the time. The first of these studies, 2010's Swarm Light is in the collection of the Maxine & Stuart Frankel Foundation For Art in Michigan. Commissioned by London's V&A, Swarm Study / III consists of four cubic forms suspended from the ceiling, each made of a grid of illuminated brass rods. A camera tracks visitors, making the lights of the installation flicker, brighten, and dim in response to their movements.

== Everything & Nothing ==
The group's first solo exhibition in Asia, Everything & Nothing, was on display at Shanghai's Yuz Museum from 20 April – 2 September 2018. The exhibition takes its title from the video installation, Everything & Nothing (2016), which attempts to question humankind's place in a technological dynamic by showing a steamroller crushing everything in its path. Everything & Nothing is the collective's first work to be created from video alone, a loop of over 6 hours. The piece was originally commissioned for the Wonder Materials exhibition at the Manchester Museum of Science and Industry, where it was displayed in 2016.

Everything & Nothing "documents the simultaneous decay and progress of the industrialised world in an age of relentless transformation." The collective's newest work at the time of the exhibition was also displayed, Turnstiles (2018), an analogue piece which consists of a maze of barriers. Self & Other, another exhibit, consists of a reflective wall of mirrors, light and glass which reflect the visitor taking a selfie. The exhibition also saw Rain Room return to the museum in a revised and larger format, 1,600 square feet (larger, in fact, than the Sharjah installation). Time Out Shanghai reviewed the exhibition saying, "Everything & Nothing is a meditative video installation about how fucked we are in this age of un-tempered technological advancement. 'Turnstiles' tracks the same story, but instead with a matrix of spinny turnstiles that you can navigate while doing your best to avoid serious injury to the groin area."

== Previous works ==
The group has previously held solo exhibitions at Lunds Konsthall, Sweden (2014), Carpenters Workshop Gallery, Paris (2012), and Pace Gallery, New York (2016). Its work is held in the collections of MoMA, Sharjah Art Foundation, Yuz Museum, LACMA and London's V&A, where its Swarm Study / III is on long-term display.

In 2017, its work Zoological debuted at London's Roundhouse as part of Wayne McGregor's +/- Human. The group's work has also formed part of the Lichtsicht Biennale (2015), Ruhrtriennale (2013), and Moscow Biennale of Contemporary Art (2011).
