= Sharjah Biennial =

Art exhibit in Sharjah, United Arab Emirates

Sharjah Biennial بينالي الشارقة
- Genre: contemporary art biennial
- Frequency: Biennial, every two years
- Locations: Sharjah, United Arab Emirates
- Inaugurated: 1993
- Founder: Sharjah Department of Culture and Information
- Most recent: 6 February - 15 June 2025
- Organiser: Sharjah Art Foundation
- Website: www.sharjahart.org

The Sharjah Biennial is a large-scale contemporary art exhibition that takes place once every two years in the city of Sharjah, United Arab Emirates. The first Sharjah Biennial took place in 1993, and was organized by the Sharjah Department of Culture and Information until it is reorientation in 2003 by Hoor bint Sultan Al Qasimi.

== History ==
=== 2005 – Sharjah Biennial 7 ===
The 7th edition, titled Belonging, was curated by Jack Persekian, Ken Lum and Tirdad Zolghadr. and took place between 6th April to 6th June 2005. The exhibition centred on the issues of 'belonging, identity and cultural location'.

=== 2007 – Sharjah Biennial 8 ===
Still Life: Art, Ecology, and the Politics of Change was curated by Mohammed Kazem, Jonathan Watkins, and Eva Scharrer. The exhibition was hosted between 4th April to 4th June 2007 at Sharjah Art Museum, Expo Centre Sharjah, Heritage Area, American University of Sharjah & several outdoor locations in Sharjah.

=== 2009 - Sharjah Biennial 9 ===
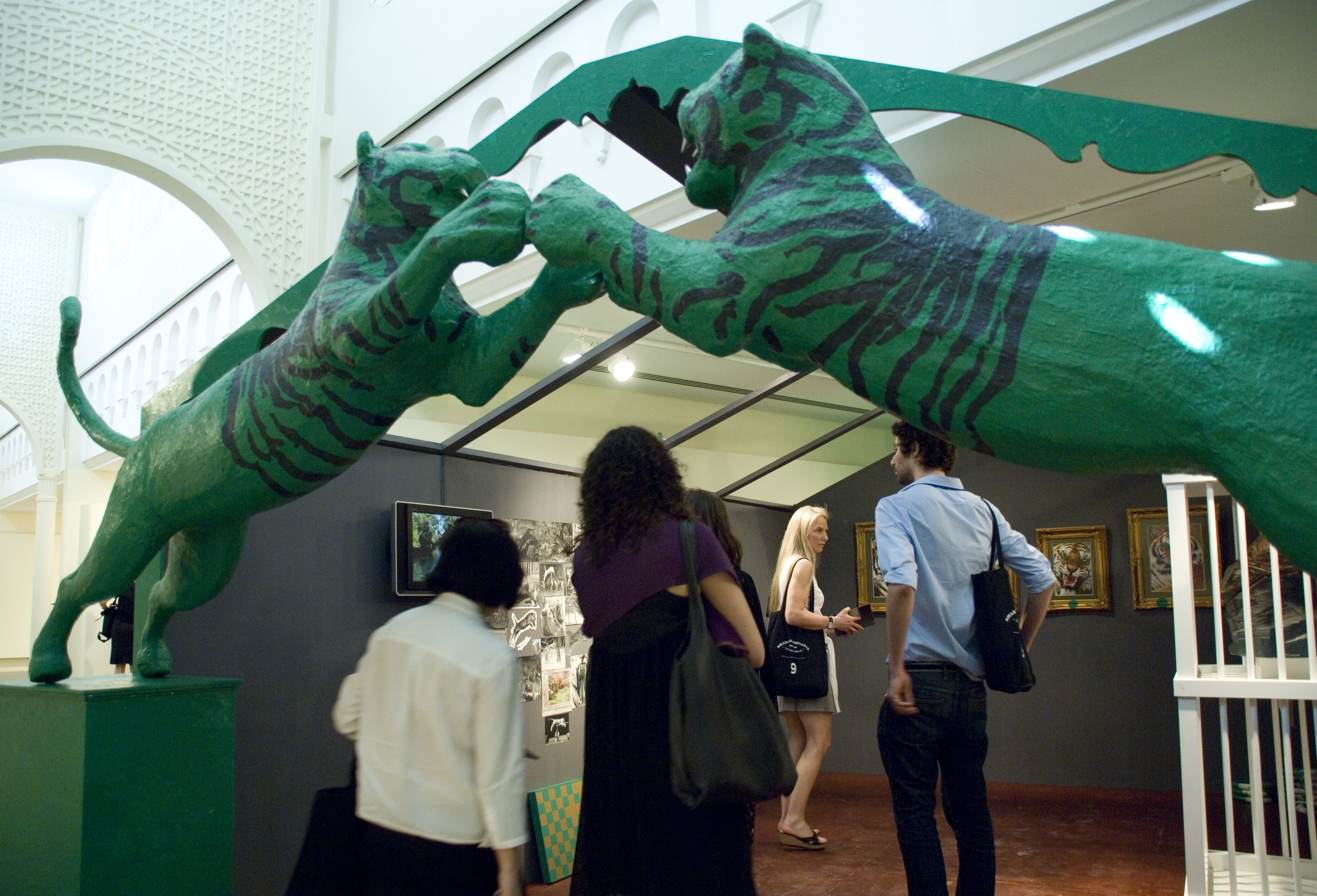
"Halcyon Tarp", installation by Firoz Mahmud at Sharjah Biennial in 2009

The 9th Sharjah Biennial's exhibition programme Provisions For The Future was curated by Isabel Carlos, and the performance and film programme Past Of The Coming Days was curated by Tarek Abou El Fetouh. The exhibition was hosted between 19th March to 16th May 2009.

Participating artists at SB9 included Hamra Abbas, Diana Al-Hadid, Firoz Mahmud, Halil Altindere, Juan Araújo, Tarek Atoui, Lili Dujourie, Hala Elkoussy, Ayse Erkmen, Amir H. Fallah, Lara Favaretto, Lamya Gargash, Mariam Ghani, Simryn Gill, Sheela Gowda, Laurent Grasso, NS Harsha, Joana Hadjithomas & Khalil Joreige, Doug Henders, Lamia Joreige, Nadia Kaabi-Linke, Hayv Kahraman, Nadia Kaabi Linke, Maider López, Liliana Porter, Karin Sander, Liu Wei, Lawrence Weiner, Yonamine, Nika Oblak & Primõz Novak, Basma Al-Sharif, Nida Sinnokrot, David Spriggs, and Lawrence Weiner among others.

=== 2011 – Sharjah Biennial 10 ===
Plot for a Biennial, the 10th edition of the biennial, was curated by Suzanne Cotter and Rasha Salti, alongside Haig Aivazian, and was hosted from 16th March to 16th May 2011. SB10 covered the so-called Arab Spring, the movement aspiring for political change that had been ongoing in various Arabic countries for several months around that period. The biennial was hosted across several venues in the heart of Sharjah, including landmarks of Emirati architecture and Sharjah’s historic Cricket Stadium. The exhibition included 119 artists and participants from 36 countries across the globe.

=== 2013 – Sharjah Biennial 11 ===
The 11th edition of the biennial, Re:emerge: Towards a New Cultural Cartography, was hosted between 13th March to 13th May 2013 and was curated by Yuko Hasegawa, chief curator of the Museum of Contemporary Art in Tokyo.

Participating artists included: Australian artists Khaled Sabsabi and Matthew Barney; Ravi Agarwal, Nevin Aladag, Francis Alÿs, Jananne Al-Ani, Alfredo & Isabel Aquilizan, and Elizabeth Peyton, Luz Maria Bedoya, David Claerbout, Olafur Eliasson, Monir Shahroudy Farmanfarmaian, Shilpa Gupta, Yu-ichi Inoue, Lamia Joreige, Jesper Just, Amar Kanwar, Kan Xuan, Pablo Lobato, Basir Mahmood, Cinthia Marcelle, Taus Makhacheva, Angelica Mesiti, Otobong Nkanga, Gabriel Orozco, Ryuichi Sakamoto, Shiro Takatani, Pascale Marthine Tayou, and Fumito Urabe.

=== 2015 – Sharjah Biennial 12 ===
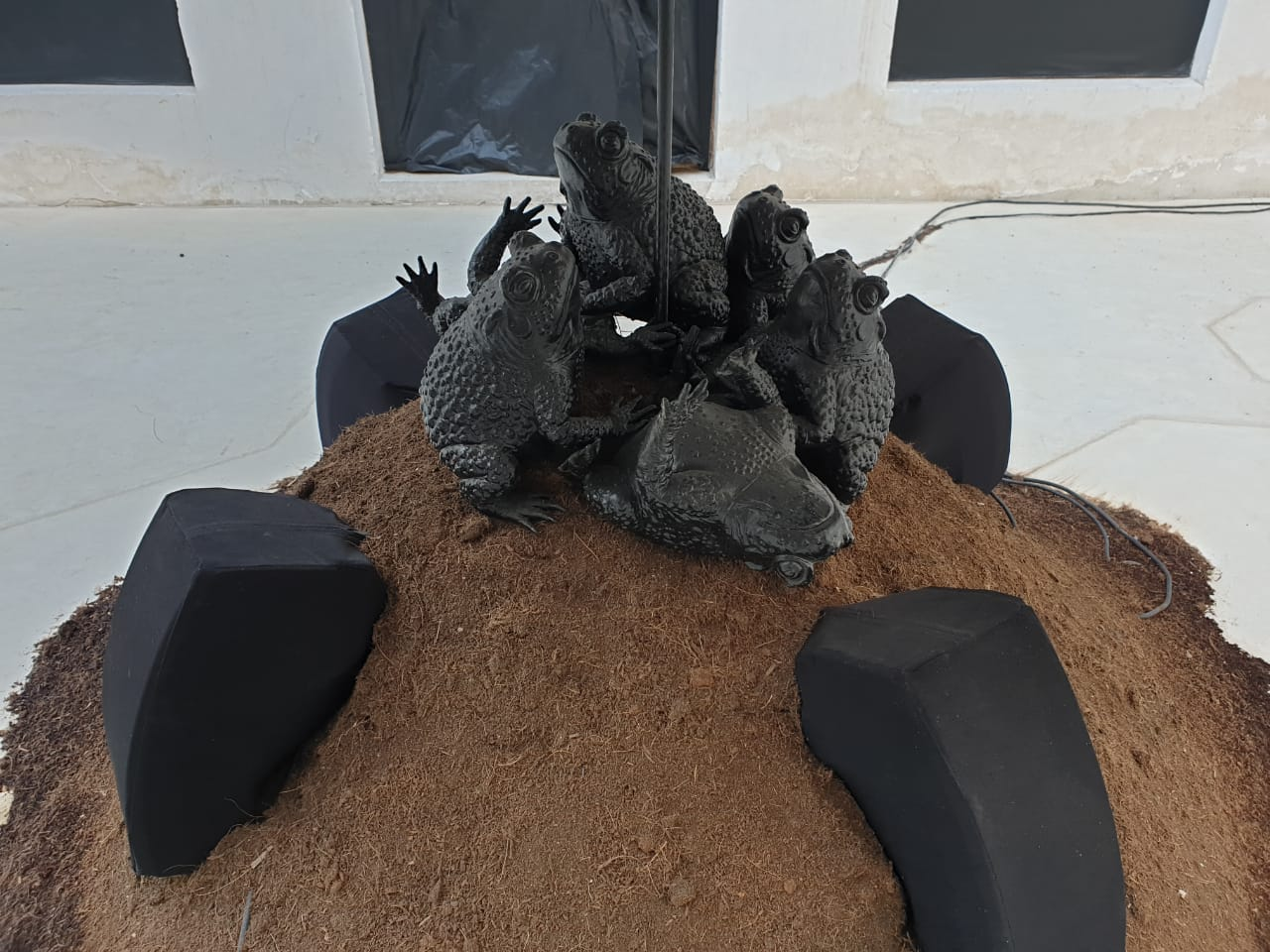
"Making New Time", part of installation by Heather Phillipson at Sharjah Biennial in 2019

The past, the present, the possible, curated by Eungie Joo, took place at public spaces around the Sharjah Art Museum, the Sharjah Art Foundation offices and Al Mureijah heritage area. The 12th Biennial was held between 5th March — 5th June 2015.

=== 2017 – Sharjah Biennial 13 ===
The 13th Biennial, titled Tamawuj, was curated by Christine Tohmé and opened on 10 March 2017 with exhibitions in Sharjah and Beirut, alongside projects in Dakar, Ramallah, and Istanbul from October 2017 through January 2018.

=== 2019 – Sharjah Biennial 14 ===
The 14th Biennial, Leaving the Echo Chamber, was curated by Zoe Butt, Omar Kholeif and Claire Tancons. The exhibition opened at Sharjah Art Foundation premises on 7th March 2019, and ran until 10th June 2019.

=== 2023 – Sharjah Biennial 15 ===
The 15th Biennial, Thinking Historically in the Present was initially conceived by Okwui Enwezor prior to his death in 2019, and curated by Sheikha Hoor Al Qasimi, Director of Sharjah Art Foundation. The exhibition opened at Sharjah Art Foundation premises, including the Kalba Ice Factory, inaugurated to house Biennial 15 exhibits, on 7 February 2023.

The 15th Sharjah Biennial featured the following artists:

- Basel Abbas and Ruanne Abou-Rahme
- Maitha Abdalla
- Fathi Afifi
- Hoda Afshar
- John Akomfrah
- Hangama Amiri
- Brook Andrew
- Malala Andrialavidrazana
- Rushdi Anwar
- Kader Attia
- Au Sow Yee
- Dana Awartani
- Omar Badsha
- Natalie Ball
- Sammy Baloji
- Mirna Bamieh
- Pablo Bartholomew
- Richard Bartholomew
- Shiraz Bayjoo
- Bahar Behbahani
- Asma Belhamar
- Rebecca Belmore
- Black Grace
- Diedrick Brackens
- Maria Magdalena Campos-Pons
- Cao Fei
- Carolina Caycedo
- Ali Cherri
- Wook-kyung Choi
- Iftikhar Dadi and Elizabeth Dadi
- Solmaz Daryani
- Annalee Davis
- Destiny Deacon
- Manthia Diawara
- Imane Djamil
- Anju Dodiya
- Kimathi Donkor
- Heri Dono
- Rehab Eldalil
- Ali Eyal
- Marianne Fahmy
- Brenda Fajardo
- Raheleh Filsoofi
- Nina Fischer & Maroan el Sani
- Coco Fusco
- Flavia Gandolfo
- Theaster Gates
- Gabriela Golder
- Gabrielle Goliath
- Yulia Grigoryants
- Joana Hadjithomas & Khalil Joreige
- Hassan Hajjaj
- David Hammons
- Archana Hande
- Fathi Hassan
- Mona Hatoum
- Rachid Hedli
- Lubaina Himid
- Laura Huertas Millán
- Saodat Ismailova
- Isaac Julien
- Saddam Jumaily
- Patricia Kaersenhout
- Robyn Kahukuiwa
- Reena Saini Kallat
- Hanni Kamaly
- Amar Kanwar
- Adam Khalil and Bayley Sweitzer with Oba
- Bouchra Khalili
- Naiza Khan
- Tania El Khoury
- Kiluanji Kia Henda
- Ayoung Kim
- Emily Kame Kngwarreye
- Hiroji Kubota
- Nusra Latif Qureshi
- Lee Kai Chung
- Faustin Linyekula
- Ibrahim Mahama
- Nabil El Makhloufi
- Jawad Al Malhi
- Waheeda Malullah
- Maharani Mancanagara
- mandla
- Lavanya Mani
- Kerry James Marshall
- Moza Almatrooshi
- Queenie McKenzie
- Steve McQueen
- Marisol Mendez
- Almagul Menlibayeva
- Helina Metaferia
- Kimowan Metchewais
- Meleanna Meyer
- Joiri Minaya
- Tahila Mintz
- Roméo Mivekannin
- Tracey Moffat
- Aline Motta
- Marwah AlMugait
- Wangechi Mutu
- Eubena Nampitjin
- Dala Nasser
- New Red Order
- Pipo Nguyen-Duy
- Mame-Diarra Niang
- Shelley Niro
- Thenjiwe Niki Nkosi
- Elia Nurvista
- Okwui Okpokwasili
- Kambui Olujimi
- Zohra Opoku
- Erkan Özgen
- Pak Khawateen Painting Club
- Pushpakanthan Pakkiyarajah
- Hyesoo Park
- Philippe Parreno
- Angela Ponce
- Prajakta Potnis
- Anita Pouchard Serra
- Jasbir Puar & Dima Srouji
- Monira Al Qadiri
- Farah Al Qasimi
- Michael Rakowitz
- Umar Rashid
- Wendy Red Star
- Veronica Ryan
- Doris Salcedo
- Abdulrahim Salem
- Sangeeta Sandrasegar
- Varunika Saraf
- Khadija Saye
- Berni Searle
- Mithu Sen
- Nelly Sethna
- Aziza Shadenova
- Smita Sharma
- Nilima Sheikh
- Yinka Shonibare
- Felix Shumba
- Semsar Siahaan
- Mary Sibande
- Kahurangiariki Smith
- Mounira Al Solh
- Inuuteq Storch
- Vivan Sundaram
- Pamela Phatsimo Sunstrum
- Obaid Suroor
- Hank Willis Thomas
- Akeim Toussaint Buck
- Hajra Waheed
- Barbara Walker
- Wang Jianwei
- Nari Ward
- Carrie Mae Weems
- Nil Yalter

=== 2025 – Sharjah Biennial 16 ===
The 16th Biennial, to carry, curated by Alia Swastika, Amal Khalaf, Megan Tamati-Quennell, Natasha Ginwala, and Zeynep Öz, featured 200 artists in 17 venues and more than 650 works. It was inaugurated on 6 February 2025, and ran until 15 June 2025.

=== 2027 – Sharjah Biennial 17 ===
In June 2025 the Sharjah Art Foundation appointed Angela Harutyunyan and Paula Nascimento as curators of the 17th edition. Titled What Remains, Sits Restive, it is scheduled to run from 21 January to 13 June 2027 and brings together more than 100 artists across 11 venues in Sharjah city, Al Dhaid, Kalba and Khor Fakkan. Harutyunyan's section addresses the continuing influence of socialist modernity and anti-colonial struggles, while Nascimento's examines infrastructure, place, and memory.

== See also ==
- Sharjah Art Foundation
- March Meeting
