= Alia Swastika =

Alia Swastika is a Jakarta based curator and writer.

== Early life and education ==
Swastika was born in Yogyakarta, 1980. She graduated from the Gadjah Mada University's Communication Department in Yogyakarta.

== Career ==
In 2000, Swastika joined KUNCI Cultural Studies Center to promote and to emerge cultural studies discourses in Indonesia. Within 2000 - 2004, Alia was actively published her essays in academic journals and presented her research in seminars and workshop. From 2002 - 2004, Swastika was Associate Editor for SURAT and Artistic Manager at Cemeti Art House, one of Indonesia’s most reputable art spaces. Since 2008 she has curated exhibitions for Ark Galerie, Jakarta. In 2005, with a grant from Asia-Europe Foundation (ASEF), she joined staff exchange programme in UfaFabrik, Berlin, Germany. In 2006, she received a grant from Asian Cultural Council to conduct a research and internship at The Asia Society, New York. Swastika received additional study grants from the Art Hub (Shanghai, 2007) and the National Art Gallery (Singapore, 2010).

Recent shows include: “The Past The Forgotten Time” (Amsterdam, Jakarta, Semarang, Shanghai, Singapore, 2007–2008); “Manifesto: The New Aesthetic of Seven Indonesian Artists” (Institute of Contemporary Arts, Singapore, 2010); and solo exhibitions for Eko Nugroho, Tintin Wulia, Wimo Ambala Bayang, and Jompet Kuswidananto.

Swastika co-curated the 2011 Biennale Jogja XI with Suman Gopinath (India). The Biennale Jogja XI / Equator # 1, was the first in a series of five international biennales to take place in Yogyakarta, Indonesia, aimed at exploring Indonesia’s cultural engagement with the participating countries. Shadow Lines, the first edition, included forty artists from Indonesia and India collaborating in the exhibition, which opened on the 26th of November 2011. Shadow Lines suggests imaginary lines that draw people together and pull them apart; it also refers to geo-political borders and the creation of modern states in South Asia. With its overarching theme of ‘religiosity, spirituality and belief’ it attempted to present ways in which artists from the two countries address and interpret their contemporary conditions, informed by their personal experiences, as also by the political structures of the countries they live in. The Biennale Jogja XI, aimed to open up new perspectives and develop confrontations that engage convention and the establishment by examining similar situations all over the world.

Swastika curated Art Dubai’s 2012 Indonesian focused Marker Program.

Swastika was a Co-Artistic Director of ROUNDTABLE: The 9th Gwangju Biennale (Korea, 2012). Swastika's curatorial approach for this project continued an exploration of the transformative realities of mobility, namely on the impact of the simultaneous loosening / tightening of borders and geo-political notions and the increasing flows of goods, people and information as a result of globalization.

She was one of five curators selected to curate the 16th Sharjah Biennial, titled to carry.

== Other activities ==
In 2024, Swastika was part of the international jury of the 60th Venice Biennale, chaired by Julia Bryan-Wilson.
