= Budi Tek =

Chinese-Indonesian entrepreneur (1957–2022)

Budiardjo 'Budi' Tek (27 October 1957 – 18 March 2022) was a Chinese-Indonesian entrepreneur, philanthropist and art collector, and the founder of the Yuz Foundation. Following a successful business career, Tek started collecting art works in 2004, amassing a collection of over 1,500 pieces, including a number of difficult to display 'mega art' works, he announced he would turn the collection into a non-profit public institution in 2017 following a 2015 diagnosis of pancreatic cancer. In 2018 he announced that he would partner with the Los Angeles County Museum of Art (LACMA) to form a foundation that would house most of his collection of Chinese contemporary art.

== Early life and business ==
Tek was born in Jakarta and grew up in Singapore. He became a successful entrepreneur and was president/director of Indonesia-based PT Sierad Produce Tbk, with interests in poultry production through to restaurant management. He took the company to IPO in 1996, but was later forced to restructure operations in response to Indonesia's debt crisis.

== Yuz collection ==
In 2004, Tek began collecting artworks, amassing a collection of over 1,500 pieces, the Yuz Collection. Invited by London's Tate to sit on its Asia Pacific Acquisitions Committee to raise awareness of Asia Pacific arts, Tek expanded the scope of his interests beyond Asian art to include Western art, acquiring works by artists such as Maurizio Cattelan, Fred Sandback, Anselm Kiefer, and Adel Abdessemed to his collection.

He is known for having collected large and difficult to display 'mega art' works, including a tigerskin made of 600,000 cigarettes, a high pressure fire hose which whips around in a purpose-built room, and Random International's Rain Room, a computer-controlled indoor rain shower which remains dry around visitors walking through the deluge.

In 2015 he announced plans to house the Yuz Collection in Bali, including a super-sized 150-metre square version of Rain Room, but the plan was shelved due to his ill health.

== Yuz Foundation ==
Tek founded the Yuz Foundation in 2007. It is the umbrella organization of the Yuz Collection and the Yuz Museum. The Yuz Museum was established in Jakarta and was followed up in May 2014 by a second venue in Shanghai,

The latter space is a non-profit museum of contemporary art, located in the core area of Shanghai West Bund. The museum was launched with the aim of establishing itself as a new landmark for exhibiting contemporary Chinese art and to be a preeminent contemporary art museum in the world. Since its opening, it has staged exhibitions by Yang Fudong, Huang Yuxing, Liu Shiyuan, Random International, Andy Warhol, and Alberto Giacometti.

Designed by Japanese architect Sou Fujimoto and built on the old site of the aircraft hangar of the former Long Hua Airport, the museum boasts a total area of 9,000 square meters, among which the hangar-converted great hall alone covers over 3,000 square meters, complementing the numerous large-scale art installations, while the other galleries offer more than 1,000 square meters for paintings, sculptures and photography of contemporary art.

In 2011, Tek was voted eighth on Art&Auction's list of the top 10 most influential figures in the art world. He was also listed by Business Insider as one of the 12 most influential art collectors in the world in 2011. In August 2013 he was conferred the French Legion of Honour.

== Joint foundation with LACMA ==
In 2018, two years into his partnership with LACMA, Tek compared it to a marriage. The move will see most of the Yuz Collection donated to a new, jointly owned foundation. Wu Hung is the consulting artistic director of the programme. The move will significantly expand LACMA's holding of contemporary Chinese art and followed attempts by Tek to convince the Chinese government to establish a special status for the Yuz Museum, which would have created a China-based NGO.

Announcing the foundation, speaking remotely to an audience in Hong Kong, Tek spoke of his desire to establish his legacy: "For the last two years, not only, I used to say that was always on my mind—the second thing on my mind—is always how my legacy will be preserved for the benefit of the world [and] the glory of my God, because I am a Christian. So, this is the second thing that I need to do in my life, actually."
