= Gabriela Golder =

Argentine artist and curator

- Born: Buenos Aires, Argentina
- Known for: Video art Installation art
- Website: gabrielagolder.com

Gabriela Golder is an Argentine artist and curator. She works primarily in experimental video art and audiovisual installation art. She also writes electronic literature.

== Life, education, and career ==
Golder was born in Buenos Aires. She attended the Universidad del Cine, Buenos Aires, Argentina from 1991 to 1995. In 1997, she conducted Post-graduate studies at the University of Santiago de Compostela, Spain. She earned her DESS (Diplôme d’Etudes Supérieures Spécialisés) in Hypermedia, Université Paris VIII, Paris, France in 2000. She has had many international artist residencies, including Banf Center for the Arts in Alberta, Canada, Wexner Center for the Arts in Columbus, Ohio; and UQAM in Montral Canada (2007).

== Works and awards ==
Her electronic literature piece, Postales, was featured in the Electronic Literature Organization Symposium for the Arts (2002). This work is a journey where "Sequences are derogating, asking for answers, facing or not each other. A quest or an escape, or simply to be a Labyrinth, where images goes back to the target, in the central node of its performance and it's hopeless thoughts: the nude, the nude flesh of life."

Her works have appeared in multiple exhibits, including in National Museum of Fine Arts of Chile; Sesc_Videobrasil Contemporary Art Biennial, São Paulo; Bienalsur, Buenos Aires; Jakarta Biennial; Whitechapel Gallery, London; Dazibao, Montreal; La Maison Rouge, Paris; Dissonance, Getty Center, Los Angeles; DEAF, Rotterdam; Sharjah Biennial, United Arab Emirates; Museum Morsbroich, Leverkusen, Germany; Monitoring, Kassel; Center for Contemporary Art Ujazdowski Castle, Warsaw; X Havana Biennial. Her work is in the collection of the ZKM Center for Art and Media Karlsruhe.

Golder has received many awards, including First Prize at the National Salon of Visual Arts (2003), First Prize Videobrasil (2003), the Media Art Award from the Zentrum für Kunst und Medietechnologie (ZKM)(2003),Grand Prize Videoformes Festival, France, (2003), First Prize at the National Salon of Visual Arts (2004), the "Sigwart Blum" from the Association of Art Critics of Argentina (2007), Ars Electronica, 80+1 Project (for ARRORRÓ project), (2009); Luis Espinal-Mostra CineTrabalho Award, Brazil, (2011); BA Specific Site, (2014); Germany, Estado da Arte, at the 21st Bienal de Arte Contemporânea Sesc_Videobrasil, (2019); Itaú Visual Arts Award (2020);Presidency of the Nation Award for the best work of the 109th National Salon of Visual Arts, 2021; KONEX Award:Art and Technology (2022); 2nd ARTHAUS Award (2022); andTokyo Video Award, Japan, (2002).

Gabriela Golder has been a consistent participant in BIENALSUR (International Biennial of Contemporary Art of the South), taking part in the editions of 2017, 2019, 2021, and 2023. In 2017, she participated in the exhibitions The Gaze That Separates from the Arms, What Remains, and Everyday Gestures. In 2019, she took part in Landscapes Among Landscapes, Immediately After and Shortly Before, Recovering Histories, Recovering Desires, Art and Territory, and Duchamp Intervention / BA. In 2021, she participated in the exhibition Echoes. A World Between the Analog and the Virtual, held in Riyadh, Saudi Arabia. During the 2023 edition, her work was part of several exhibitions, including How to Escape Planet Earth, Festival of Art, Science and Technology – FACTO 10, Strangers in the Palace. Chapter 2, SIGNS IN THE LANDSCAPE. Chapter 1, SIGNS IN THE LANDSCAPE. Chapter 2, Experimental Identity, and Interstitial Interferences, held at the Centre Pompidou Málaga, Spain.
