= March Meeting =

March Meeting is an annual gathering of international art practitioners and art institutions in Middle East and North Africa. Organized by Sharjah Art Foundation and was launched in 2008 in the city of Sharjah, United Arab Emirates, to encourage regional art professionals to connect, partner and share ideas in the sphere of contemporary art.

== Editions ==
- 2008: Twenty-four delegates attended the first meeting held in Sharjah, in collaboration between the Sharjah Biennial, the Young Arab Theatre Fund, Start and Art Dubai
- 2009: Held between March 16-20, in collaboration between Sharjah Biennial, Tate Modern and 25 International curators from across the region and the UK to participate in a long week intensive workshop for young curators
- 2010: Held in collaboration with ArteEast, The programme featured a series of public talks by different speakers, including Abdelfattah Kilito and Okwui Enwezor. the event also featured for the first time, Dardashat, an informal project discussions highlighting nearly sixty new projects from around the world.
- 2011: The fourth annual March Meeting featured 42 institutions representative, artists and art professionals in the Middle East, North Africa and South Asia. took place in Sharjah from March 13 to March 15, 2011.
- 2012: Held between 17–19 of march with more than 80 speakers participated including: Yuko Hasegawa, Eungie Joo, Hans Ulrich Obrist, Susanne Pfeffer, Beatrix Ruf many others.
- 2013: Took place from March 14 to 17, during the opening week of Sharjah Biennial 11. list of speakers included Sarat Maharaj, Paulo Herkenhoff, Hu Fang and others.
- 2014: Curated by Eungie Joo, the forthcoming 2015 Sharjah Biennial 12, included Kristine Khouri, Rasha Salti, Eric Baudelaire, Ayreen Anastas, Rene Gabr, Christine Tohme, Tarek Abu El Fetouh, Sarah Rifky and others.
- 2015: Held between 11th and 16th May as part of an extended conversation that began with March Meeting 2014.

== See also ==
- Sharjah Art Foundation
- Sharjah Biennial
