= Mira Dancy =

American painter

Mira Dancy (born 1979) is an American painter. Dancy is known for her paintings on plexiglass of nudes, often executed in bright fluorescent colors. Since her January 2015 show at Night Gallery in Los Angeles, her work has been in demand from Hong Kong and Paris to MoMA PS1's "Greater New York" show, and her name has appeared on any number of annual top-ten lists of artists to watch. Her work is held in the permanent collection of the Whitney Museum of American Art. In addition her work "No Man's Land" at the Rubell Family Collection (traveled) and "Unrealism" an exhibition organized by Jeffery Deitch and Larry Gagosian, Yuz Museum, Shanghai (2016); and Galerie Hussenot, Paris (2015). Her work is included in the collections of LACMA, Los Angeles; Columbus Museum of Art; and the YUZ Foundation, Shanghai.
