= The Flying Saucer, Sharjah =

Building in Sharjah, United Arab Emirates

Coordinates: 25.3531°N 55.4122°E

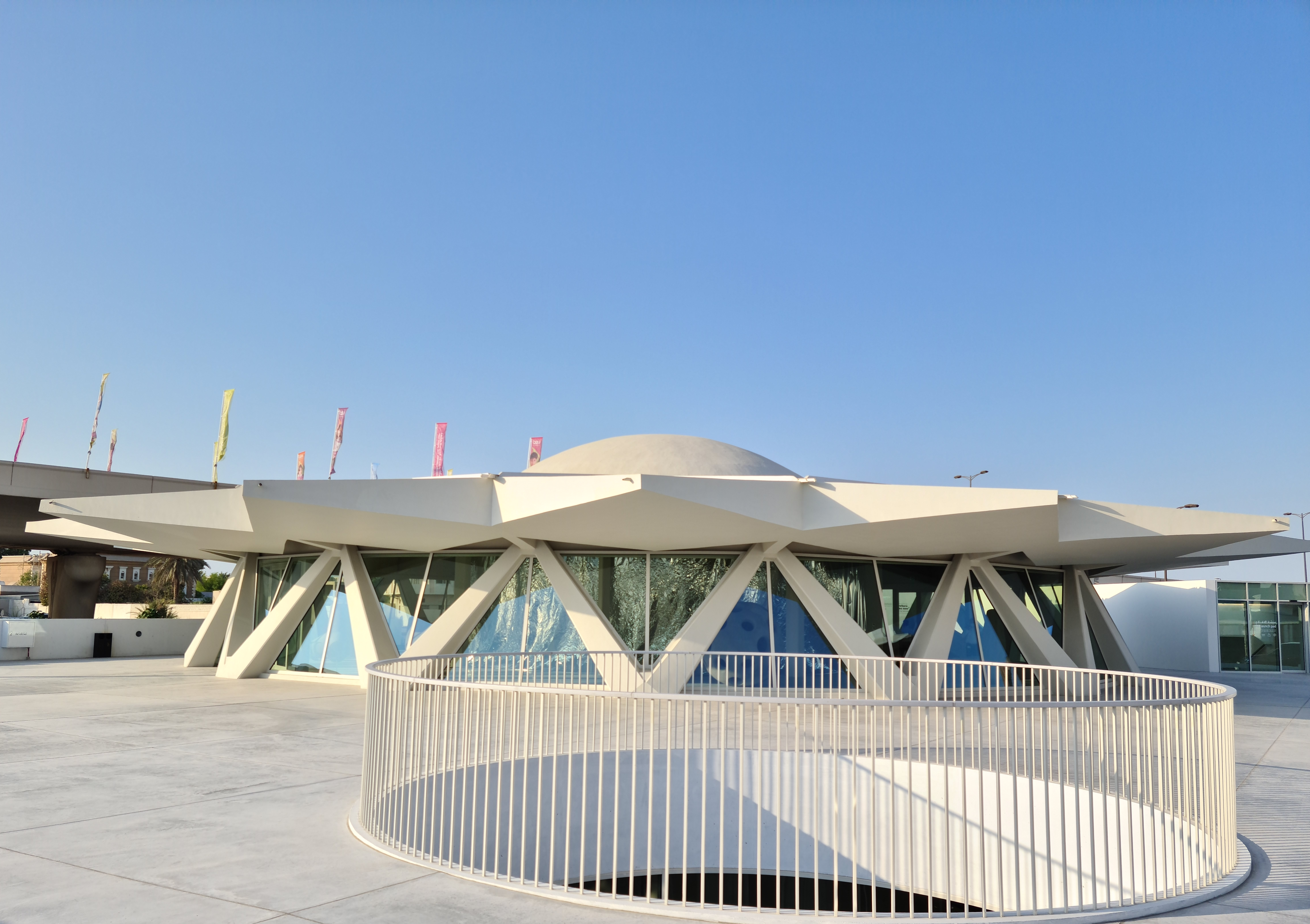
The Flying Saucer, Sharjah

The Flying Saucer in Sharjah, United Arab Emirates, is a 1978 building constructed in Brutalist style and originally opened as a café, restaurant, newsstand, gift shop and pharmacy. It was subsequently a Lal's supermarket from 1988 to 1997. It has been restored by Sharjah Art Foundation and is now open as a community art space.

== Building ==
The building sits on the intersection of the Sharjah suburbs of Dasman, Ghubaibah, Yarmouk and Ramla and gave its name to the eponymous Flying Saucer Roundabout until this was razed to make way for the current road network.

The Flying Saucer was constructed between 1974 and 1978 at what was, until 1972, the gateway to the British Air Force and Trucial Oman Scouts camp in Dasman. Its distinctive shape led to the naming of the roundabout by local residents. The Flying Saucer consists of a star-shaped canopy around a seven-metre-high dome over a circular arrangement of eight columns and V-shaped pillars. The building's facade is panoramic.

It became a Co-Op supermarket for a time (1997–2008) before being used as an Al Tazaj fast food restaurant and was subsequently acquired by the Sharjah Art Foundation for use as a community centre, display space and arts centre. The original café at The Flying Saucer was opened by entrepreneur Gerard Raymond, whose Gerard's Cafés became a popular local brand with branches in Sharjah, Dubai and Ajman.

In June 2022, the building was selected as one of 20 shortlisted projects from 16 countries for the 15th cycle of the Aga Khan Award for Architecture.

== Arts centre ==
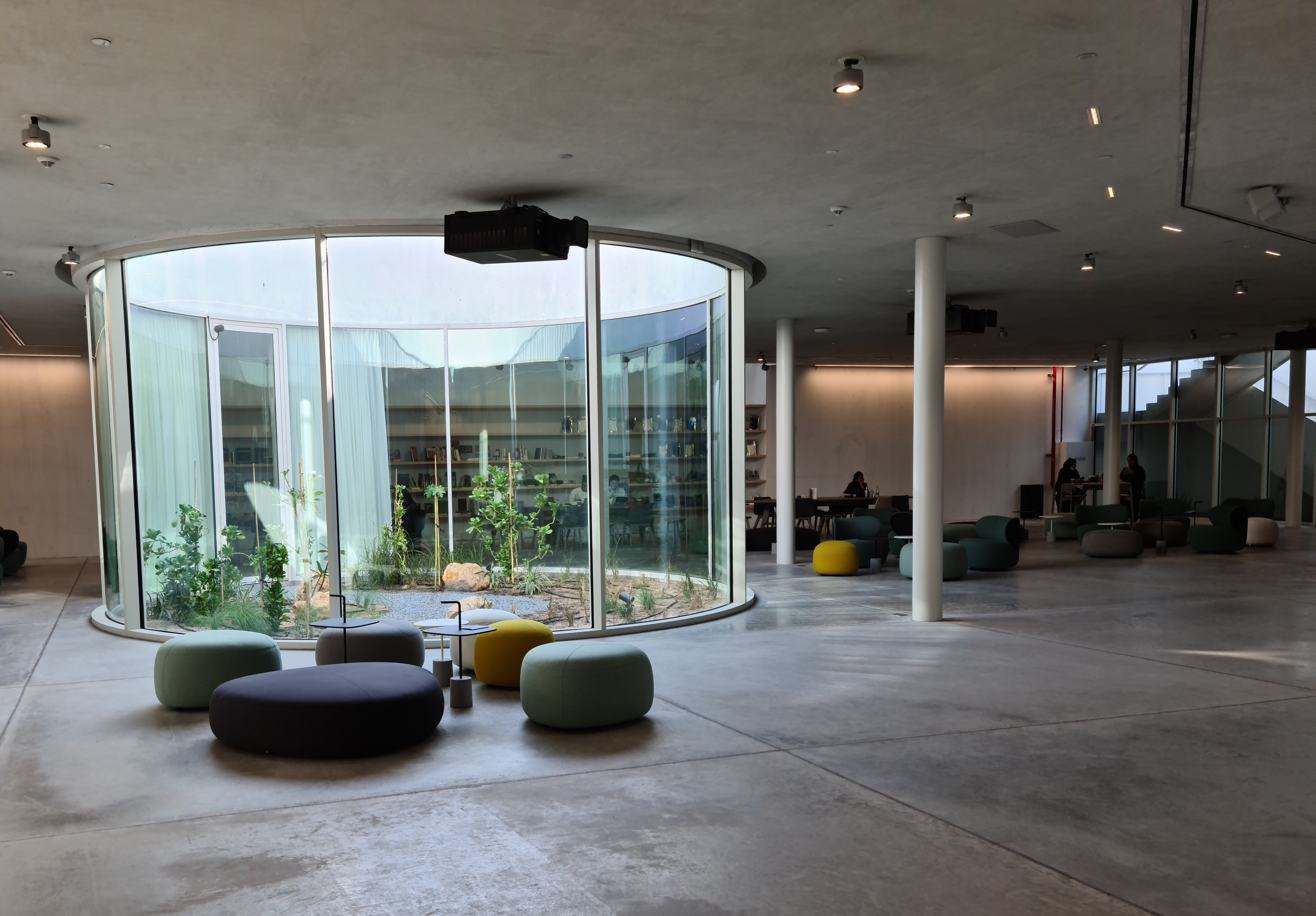
The Launch Pad Workspace at the Flying Saucer comprises a Fen Cafe, library and shop as well as a number of projectors for screenings, a meeting room and an event space.

Sharjah Art Foundation acquired The Flying Saucer in 2012 and embarked on a program of renovations under Mona El Mousfy of SpaceContinuum Design Studio. Fittings, partitions and false ceilings installed by tenants over the years were removed, originally to house the 2015 exhibition '1980–Today: Exhibitions in the United Arab Emirates', part of the 56th Venice Biennale. The ground-up renovation of the space began in 2018 and has included the construction of the Launch Pad underground space and community art area, built underneath the original Flying Saucer building and lit by a courtyard and three skylights. The Launch Pad includes a public art library and film screening space, as well as workspaces and social areas. The main Flying Saucer building is now being used as an art space, with an ongoing programme of film screenings, workshops, poetry readings and other events.

The Flying Saucer is one of a number of 1970s and '80s buildings under restoration by Sharjah Art Foundation and the Sharjah Architecture Triennial, including the Kalba Ice Factory, Al Jubail Vegetable Market, the 1970s Khor Fakkan Cinema (which is being redeveloped as a music school), and a pyramid-roofed kindergarten (which is being made into a community centre).
