= David Spriggs (artist) =

British Canadian artist

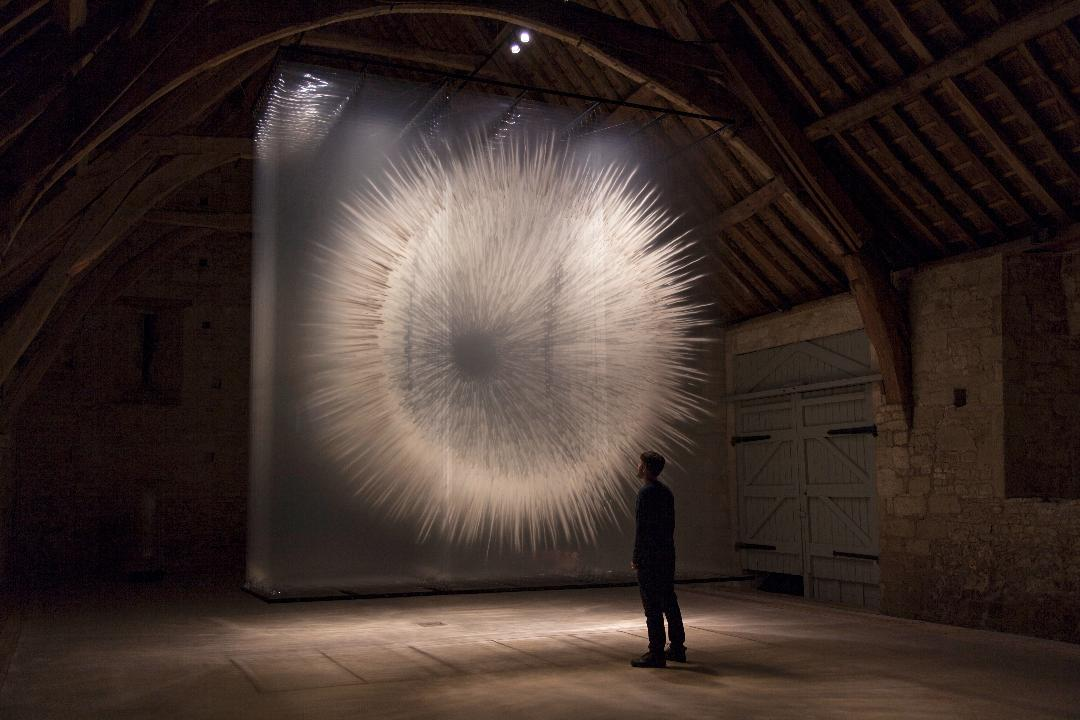
- Born: August 24, 1978 (age 47); United Kingdom
- Known for: Installation

David Spriggs (born August 24, 1978) is a Canadian-British installation artist known for his large-scale 3D ephemeral installations that layer transparent images, a technique he first began to use in 1999, to create the illusion of a three-dimensional landscape.

== Early life and career ==
David Spriggs was born in 1978 in Manchester, England, and immigrated to Canada in 1992.

Spriggs received a BFA in painting and sculpture from the Emily Carr Institute of Art & Design, Vancouver (2000), and an MFA in sculpture from Concordia University, Montreal (2007).

He has exhibited internationally at galleries and museums such as the Southern Alberta Art Gallery, Lethbridge, Alberta (2008). His work has been presented in solo exhibitions at the UQAM Gallery, University of Quebec, Montreal (2010), Messum's Wiltshire in the UK, the Prague Bienniale 5 in the Czech Republic, the Louis Vuitton Gallery in Macau, and at Arsenal Contemporary Montreal.

Group presentations have included the Sharjah Biennial (2009) and Arts Council Montreal (2009). His work is in the permanent collections of the Montreal Museum of Fine Arts and the National Museum of Quebec. In 1998 he was the recipient of the Calgary Immigrants of Distinction Arts Award.

In January 2023, his artwork "Red Gravity" was used as the cover for the Peter Gabriel song "Panopticom", the debut single from his forthcoming album "i/o", and it is used during live performances of the song on screens.

Spriggs is currently based in Vancouver, British Columbia.

== Art ==
David Spriggs' installations are predominantly presented as large-scale immersive pieces, including the work Axis of Power commissioned and produced by the 9th Sharjah Biennial, or his work Gold, a stratum of chromatic strips in an installation formed from 168 precisely layered spray paintings to form a 36-foot-wide installation. For the work Gold, he spray-painted each layer by hand in order to create a composition of images reminiscent of the pediment that adorns the New York Stock Exchange.

While there are some parallels that might be drawn with works pertaining to the Optic Art movement, most critics highlight that Spriggs' installations are not optic works. The illusory nature of the layered installations is just a means to realize a deeper concept: how we compose the apparent forms in our head. For the solo exhibition of Spriggs at the Neutral Ground Art Center in Saskatchewan, Canada, exhibition curator John G. Hampton wrote that "Spriggs' works are related to a process that relies upon the way we interpret vision, and exploits our Gestaltian susceptibility to illusion conflating disparate parts into an actualized whole. His installation strategy undermines the veracity of its own illusion by allowing the viewer access to the sides of his installation, where the individual sheets are identifiable and the depth created by the layering is pulled apart. Spriggs’ virtual environments, like specters or holograms, create an illusion of physical presence without physicality. Instead, its physicality exists in the realm of the visual and in our mental processing of visual phenomena."

== Solo exhibitions ==
- Messums Wiltshire, Tisbury, United Kingdom, David Spriggs: Material Light, 2017
- Wood Street Art Gallery. Pittsburgh, Pennsylvania, United States, David Spriggs: Gold. Permutations of Light, 2016
- Musée des beaux-arts de Sherbrooke, Sherbrooke, Quebec, Canada, David Spriggs: PRISM, 2016
- Arsenal Montreal, Montreal, Quebec, Canada, David Spriggs: PRISM, 2015
- Galerie de l'UQAM, Montreal, Quebec, Canada, David Spriggs: Stratachrome

== Bibliography ==
- Relationscapes: Movement, Art, Philosophy, by Erin Manning, 2012 ISBN 9780262134903
- David Spriggs, Stratachrome, by Marie-Eve Beaupré, 2010 ISBN 978-2-920325-33-3
