= Sharjah Art Foundation =

Contemporary art and cultural foundation in Sharjah, UAE

مؤسسة الشارقة للفنون
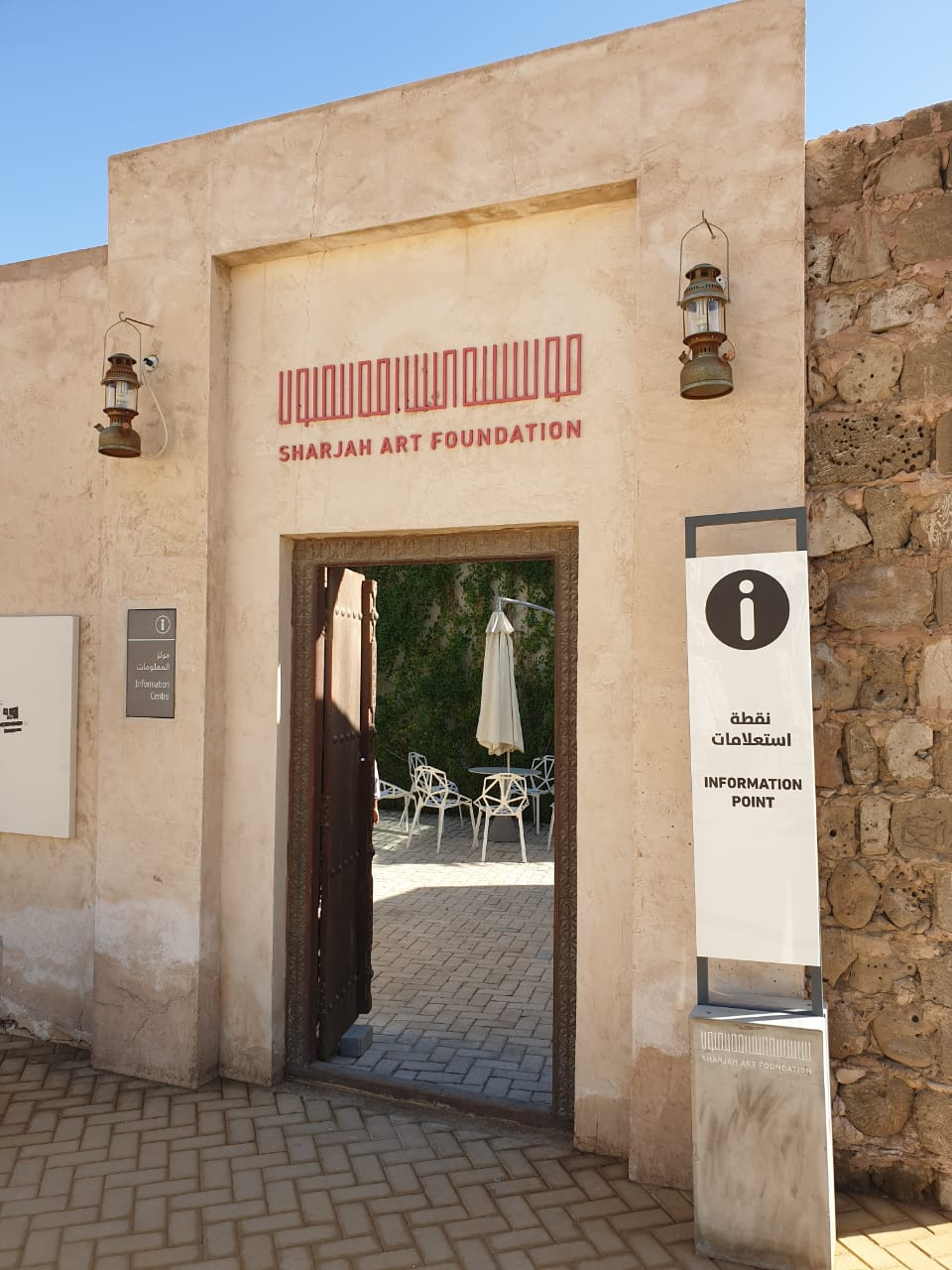
- Formation: 2009
- Founder: Hoor bint Sultan Al Qasimi
- Purpose: Art and cultural programming
- Headquarters: Sharjah, United Arab Emirates
- Parent organization: Department of Culture and Information, Government of Sharjah.
- Website: http://www.sharjahart.org/

The Sharjah Art Foundation (Arabic: مؤسسة الشارقة للفنون) is a contemporary art and cultural foundation based in Sharjah, the United Arab Emirates, founded in 2009 by Hoor Al Qasimi, daughter of Sultan bin Muhammad Al-Qasimi, a member of the Supreme Council of the United Arab Emirates and current ruler of Sharjah, to support artists and artistic practice in the Sharjah communities, the UAE, and the region via different platforms that include Sharjah Biennial, the annual March Meeting, art residencies, production grants, commissions, art exhibitions, artistic research and publications. Its programme includes exhibitions of work by Arab and international artists, performances, music, film screenings, artist talks and educational activities for audiences ranging from children to adults. The foundation states that it aims to promote public learning and participation in art practice.

== Sharjah Biennial ==
Sharjah Biennial is an international art exhibition that takes place in Sharjah, United Arab Emirates, once every two years. The first International Sharjah Biennial took place in 1993 under the organization of Sharjah Department of Culture and Information and later transferred to Sharjah Art Foundation, for management and organization since its creation in 2009. A Biennial Prize is awarded at the end of each exhibition by a jury of renowned art world figures.

== March Meeting ==
March Meeting is an annual gathering of international art practitioners and art institutions in the region. It is organized by Sharjah Art Foundation and was launched in 2008, to encourage regional art professionals to connect, partner and share ideas in the sphere of contemporary art.

== Buildings ==
As well as constructing Rain Room, a permanent home for the experiential artwork by art collective Random International, Sharjah Art Foundation has reconstructed and made significant additions to The Flying Saucer, Sharjah as well as to the Al Jubail Vegetable Market, the 1970s era Khor Fakkan Cinema, which is being redeveloped as a music school and a pyramid-roofed kindergarten which is being made into a community centre. In February 2023 it opened Kalba Ice Factory, a restoration by the Lima practice 51-1 Arquitectos of a disused 1970s fish-feed mill and ice store in Kalba on Sharjah's east coast, completed in time for the 2023 Sharjah Biennial.

== Exhibition ==
List of notable exhibitions organized by Sharjah Art Foundation:

Year	Title	Curator	Artists
2009	Disorientation II: The Rise and Fall of Arab Cities	Jack Persekian	
2010	A Retrospective: Tarek Al Ghoussein	Jack Persekian	Tarek Al Ghoussein
2011	Drift	Hoor Al Qasimi	Bouchra Khalili, Doug Henderson, Rika Noguchi.
2011	This Situation		Tino Sehgal
2012	What should I do to live in your life?		Lee Kit, João Vasco Paiva
2012	Museum of Optography, The Purple Chamber		Derek Ogbourne
2012	In Spite of it All	Hoor Al Qasimi	Rashid Masharawi, Marcel Odenbach, Melik Ohanian, Raeda Saadeh, Sharif Waked.
2012	Just Knocked Out: in collaboration with MoMa	Peter Eleey	Lara Favaretto
2013	Chaos into Clarity: Re-Possessing a Funktioning Utopia	Shannon Ayers Holden	Xenobia Bailey, Hassan Hajjaj, Zak Ove.
2013	I Look To You And I See Nothing	Olivier Varenne and Nicole Durling	Ryoji Ikeda, Anish Kapoor, Terence Koh, Teresa Margolles, Michelangelo Pistoletto, Lawrence Weiner, Gino de Dominicis, Shezad Dawood and Sophie Calle.
2014	/seconds.	Peter Lewis	Abdullah Al Saadi, Shezad Dawood, Leo Fitzmaurice, Margaret Harrison, Taraneh Hemami, Mohammed Kazem, Peter Kennard, Hassan Sharif, Sergei Sviatchenko, Jalal Toufic.
2018	Rain Room		Hannes Koch, Florian Ortkrass

== See also ==
- Emirati Artists
