= Kambui Olujimi =

American visual artist (born 1976)

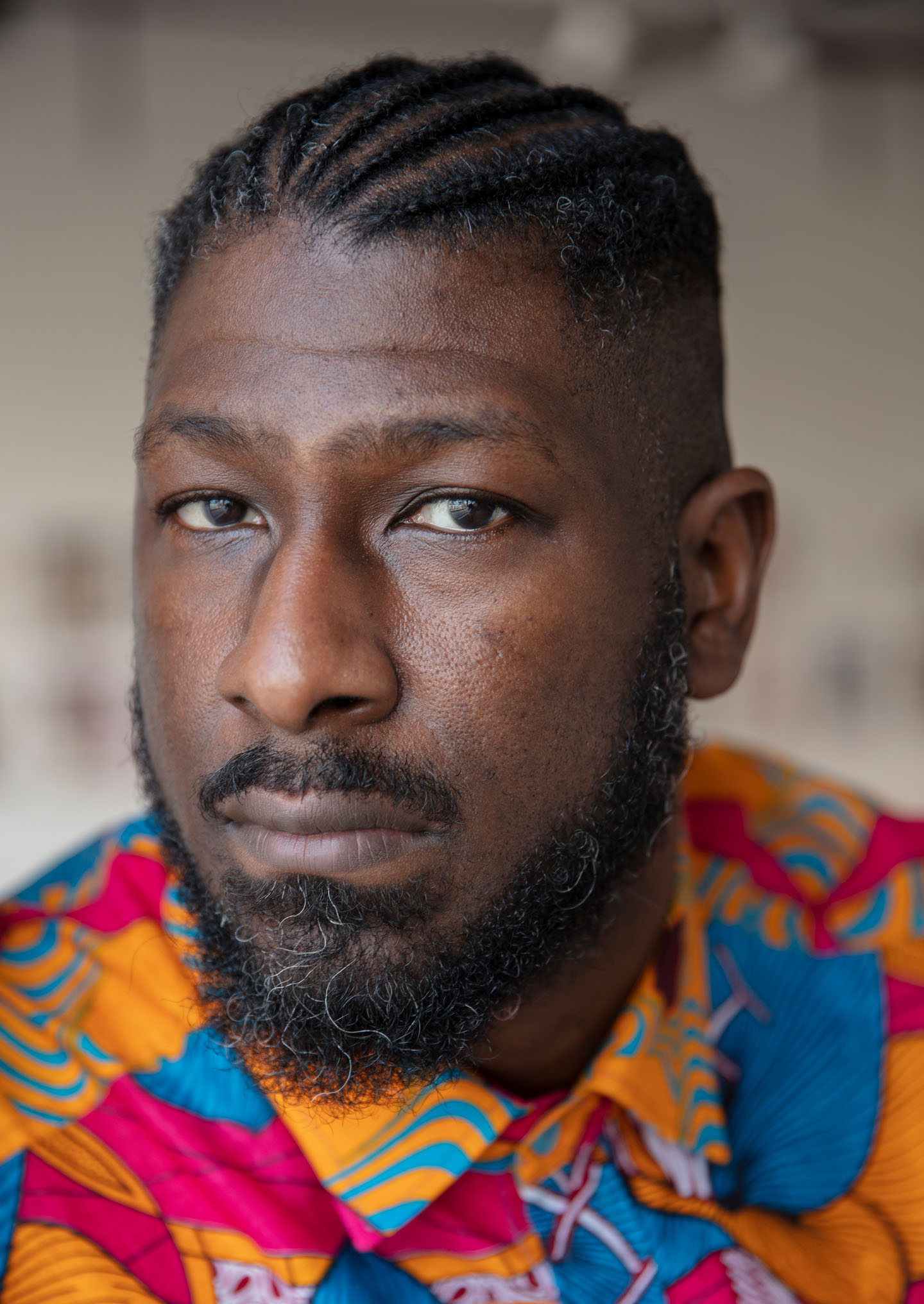
- Born: 1976 (age 49–50); Brooklyn, New York U.S.
- Occupation: Visual artist
- Website: KambuiOlujimi.com

Kambui Olujimi (born 1976) is a New York-based visual artist working across disciplines using installation, photography, performance, tapestry, works on paper, video, large sculptures and painting. His artwork reflects on public discourse, mythology, historical narrative, social practices, exchange, mediated cultures, resilience and autonomy.

== Early life and education ==
Olujimi was born and grew up in the Bedford-Stuyvesant neighborhood of Brooklyn in New York City.

In 1996, he attended Bard College. In 2002, he received a BFA from Parsons School of Design. He attended the Skowhegan School of Painting and Sculpture in Maine in 2006. In 2013, Olujimi received an MFA from Columbia University School of the Arts.

== Career ==
Reviews of his work have appeared in publications including Art in America, The New York Times, The New Yorker, Modern Painters, Artforum, Hyperallergic, and The Brooklyn Rail. Throughout his career he has received numerous grants and fellowships including from A Blade of Grass, the Jerome Foundation, and the Fine Arts Work Center in Provincetown. He has also collaborated with artists Hank Willis Thomas, Christopher Myers, and Coco Fusco.

Olujimi's visual work is in the permanent collections of the Brooklyn Museum of Art, the Whitney Museum of American Art, the Speed Art Museum, the Nasher Museum of Art at Duke University, and the Cleveland Museum of Art.

He has taught in the Visual Art programs at Columbia University and Cooper Union.

Olujimi was one of the subjects of the short feature Through a Lens Darkly, concerning the struggle for African American photographers to receive recognition.

On April 2, 2026, it was announced that the Barclays Center in Brooklyn, New York, would unveil in May 2027 Olujimi’s We Always Have Room for One More featuring “a group of larger-than-life bronze figures playing the Brooklyn street game Skelly” on the plaza at the main entrance.

== Personal life ==
Some of Olujimi's work is inspired by Bedford-Stuyvesant community leader and activist Catherine Arline, a woman he considered a surrogate mother and referred to as his guardian angel. Olujimi described his series of portraits of Arline as both a "mourning practice" and an experiment in "memory work."

Olujimi currently lives and works in Queens, New York.

== Honors ==
=== Awards ===
- 2021: Awarded Joan Mitchell Fellowship by the Joan Mitchell Foundation
- 2020: Awarded Colene Brown Art Prize by BRIC Arts Media

=== Artist-in-residency ===
- 2023: Denniston Hill (Glen Wild, NY)
- 2022: Yaddo (Saratoga Springs, NY)
- 2022: Archie Bray Foundation (Helena, MT)
- 2019: Black Rock Senegal (Dakar, Senegal)
- 2018: MacDowell (Peterborough, NH)
- 2017: Robert Rauschenberg Residency (Captiva, FL)
- 2016: Queenspace Residency (Long Island City, NY)
- 2015: The Fountainhead Residency (Miami, FL)
- 2015: The Lower Manhattan Cultural Council (New York, NY), Process Space Residency
- 2015: Meet Factory (Prague, Czech Republic)
- 2015: Civitella Ranieri (Umbertide, Italy)
- 2014: Franconia Sculpture Park (Franconia, MN)
- 2013: Tropical Lab 7 (Singapore)
- 2011: The Center for Book Arts (New York, NY)
- 2010: Acadia Summer Arts Program (Mt. Desert, ME)
- 2009: Bemis Center for Contemporary Arts (Omaha, NE)
- 2009: Santa Fe Art Institute (Santa Fe, NM)
- 2007-2009: Fine Arts Work Center at Provincetown (Provincetown, MA), 2nd Year Fellow
- 2007-2009: Apexart: Outbound Residency to Kellerberin, Australia (Kellerberin, Australia)
- 2006: Skowhegan School of Painting and Sculpture (Skowhegan, ME)
- 2005: BCAT / Rotunda Gallery Multimedia Artist Residency (New York, NY)

== Exhibitions ==
Olujimi's work has been exhibited in a number of institutions nationally, including: the Whitney Museum of American Art, Los Angeles County Museum of Art, The Andy Warhol Museum, Studio Museum in Harlem (New York, NY), CUE Arts Foundation (New York, NY), MIT List Visual Arts Center (Cambridge, MA), Apexart (New York, NY), Art in General (Brooklyn, NY), The Sundance Film Festival (Park City, UT), Smithsonian Institution, (Washington D.C.), Madison Museum of Contemporary Art (Madison, WI), Museum of Contemporary Art Los Angeles (Los Angeles, CA), Museum of Modern Art (New York, NY), Yerba Buena Center for the Arts (San Francisco, CA), Contemporary Arts Museum Houston (Houston, TX), The Blanton Museum of Art (Austin, TX), The Newark Museum (Newark, NJ), the Brooklyn Museum (Brooklyn, NY), and Project for Empty Space, Newark, NJ.

Internationally, Olujimi's work has been exhibited in the Sharjah Biennial 15 (Sharjah, UAE), the Dakar Biennale Dak'Art 14 (Dakar, Senegal), Zeitz MOCAA (Cape Town, South Africa), Museo Nacional Centro de Arte Reina Sofia (Madrid, Spain), Kiasma (Helsinki, Finland), Para Site (Hong Kong, China), The Jim Thompson Art Center (Bangkok, Thailand).

He has given artist lectures in many institutions nationally and internationally, including Carleton University, Ottawa, University of Buffalo, the Modern Art Museum of Fort Worth, Rhode Island School of Design.

== Works and publications ==
- Olujimi, Kambui (March 1998). "No Regrets No Redemption". The American Poetry Review. 27 (2): 42–43. ISSN 0360-3709. JSTOR 27782650. OCLC 5542854838.
- Olujimi, Kambui (2003). Off the Record. Brooklyn, NY: The Skylight Gallery at Restoration Plaza. OCLC 758496035.
- Olujimi, Kambui (2007). The Lost River's Dreamers Index by Dr. Keller. Hartford, CT: Real Art Ways. OCLC 427270355.
- Olujimi, Kambui; Hickey, Andria; Myers, Christopher (2010). Wayward North. New York: Art in General. ISBN 978-1-934-89028-8. OCLC 829395760.
- Olujimi, Kambui. Zulu Time; essays by Sampada Aranke, Gregory Volk, and Leah Kolb. Madison, WI: Madison Museum of Contemporary Art. 2017. Exhibition Catalogue.
- Olujimi, Kambui. Walk With Me; essays by Jasmine Wahi and Christopher Myers. Newark, NJ: Project for Empty Space. 2020. Exhibition Monograph.
- Olujimi, Kambui. North Star; text by Hanif Abdurraqib. Interview by Koyo Kouoh. Gregory R. Miller and Co. 2025. ISBN 978-1-941366-83-7.

== Sources ==
- Harris, Thomas A, and Kambui Olujimi. Through a Lens Darkly: Philosophy of the Artist, 2014. Internet resource.
