= Hangama Amiri =

Afghan-Canadian artist

Hangama Amiri is an Afghan-Canadian feminist artist, who works in painting and video. Amiri's work has been exhibited in Canada in cities including Halifax, Vancouver, Toronto and Lunenburg. Internationally, her work has appeared in New York, London, Hong Kong, Italy, France, Morocco and Venice.

== Early life and education ==
Hangama Amiri was born in Kabul, Afghanistan. She and her family became refugees when she was six, leaving because of the Taliban in 1996. Over the next few years, they lived in Pakistan, Iran, and Tajikistan.

As a high school student in Tajikistan, Amiri submitted an early painting, “Twin Buddhas”, to a competition held by the UN Refugee Agency (UNHCR), winning a first prize. The painting dealt with the reconstruction of the Buddhas of Bamyan, which were destroyed by the Taliban in March 2001. The prize enabled Amiri to attend Olimov College of Art in Dushanbe, Tajikistan. She received a Bachelor in Fine Arts from Olimov College in 2005.

Her family settled in Nova Scotia, Canada in 2005. Amiri attended Nova Scotia College of Art and Design in Halifax, Nova Scotia, Canada. In 2012, she graduated from NSCAD with a second Bachelor in Fine Arts degree. A visit to Afghanistan in 2010 inspired her series of paintings "The Wind-Up Dolls of Kabul". Work from this series was shown during the 2013 Passion for Freedom Festival in a gallery in London, England.

In 2013, Amiri held a residency in Lunenburg, Nova Scotia. In 2015, Amiri was selected to receive a Fulbright Canada grant to attend Yale University in New Haven, Connecticut. In 2017, Amiri was an Artist-in-Residence at the Lunenburg School of the Arts in Nova Scotia. In 2019, Amiri was an Artist-in-Residence at Long Road Projects in Jacksonville, Florida.

As of fall 2018, she entered the master's program at the Yale School of Art as a Fulbright Fellow.

== Works ==
Much of Amiri's work is figurative and focuses on cross-cultural dialogue, women's rights, and feminism. Many of her pieces deal with the treatment of women in Afghanistan, in particular the infringements of their human rights. Her series “Memory Diary”, small paintings on wood, explores childhood memories of Afghanistan.

More recently, she has completed two landscape projects. The first group of works, At the Edge of the Shore was exhibited in 2013 in Lunenburg, Nova Scotia, a UNESCO World Heritage Site. In 2017, Amiri completed a second residency there, again focusing on landscapes.
