= Rain Room =

Interactive artwork by Hannes Koch and Florian Ortkrass (2012)

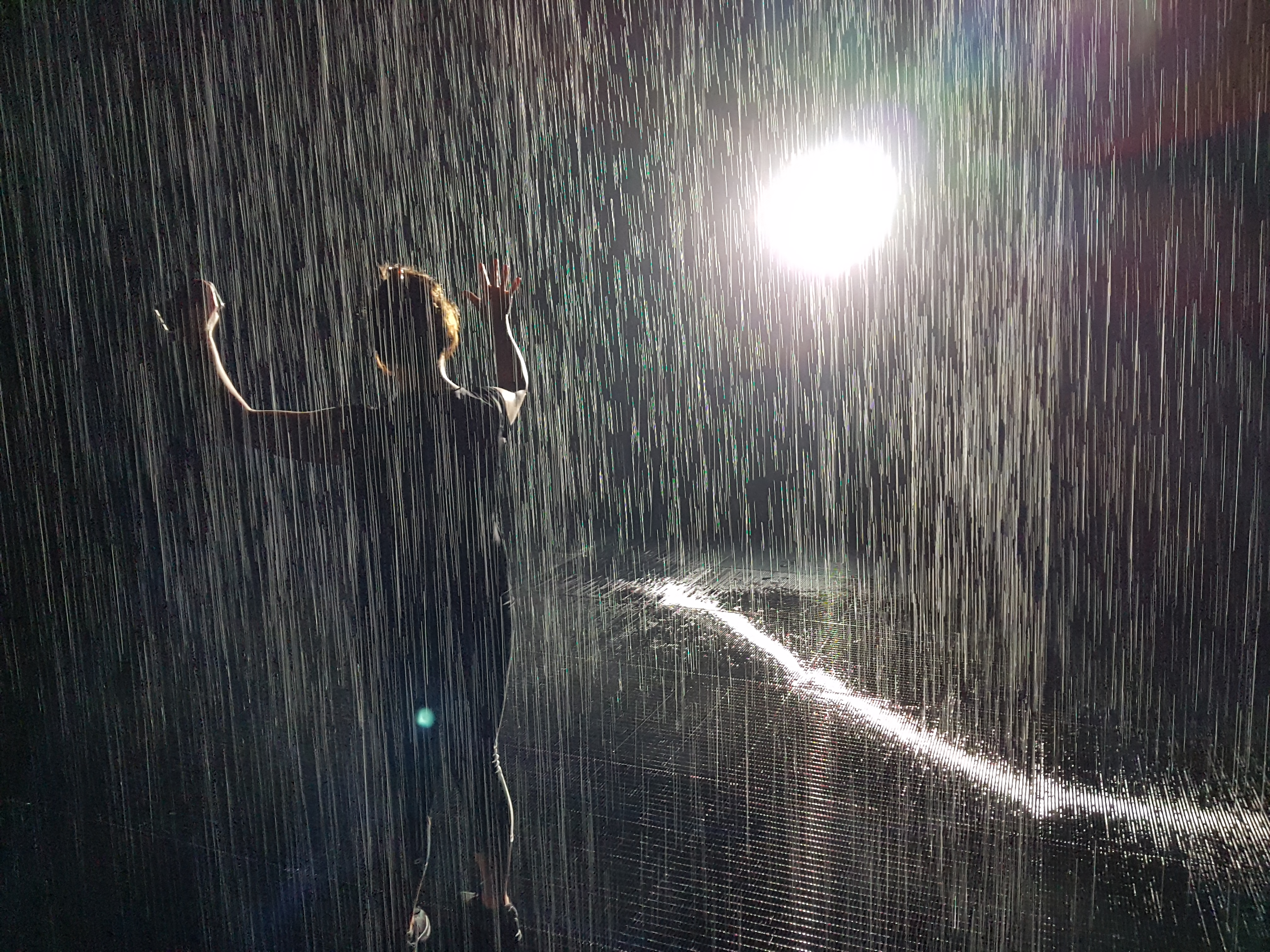
- Rain Room Sharjah, a permanent exhibition of the experiential art installation by Random International
- Artist: Hannes Koch and Florian Ortkrass
- Year: 2012
- Location: Sharjah
- Website: www.sharjahart.org/en/whats-on/details/rain-room

Rain Room is a 2012 experiential artwork by Hannes Koch and Florian Ortkrass of Random International, which found its first permanent installation in Sharjah, United Arab Emirates in 2018. The piece had previously shown in a number of international art venues, including New York's Museum of Modern Art (MoMA) and London's Barbican.

== Description ==
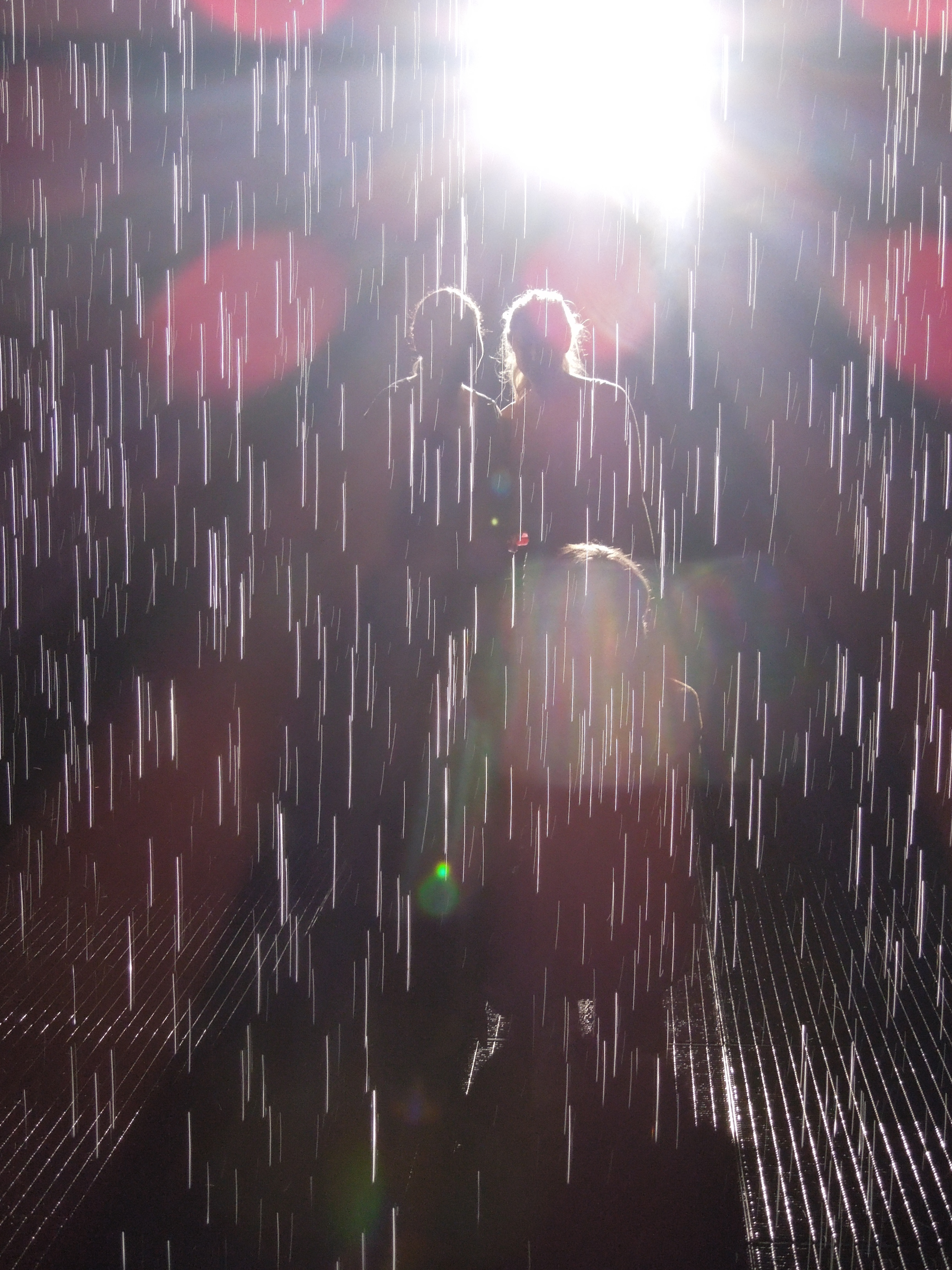
Rain Room at MoMA (2013)

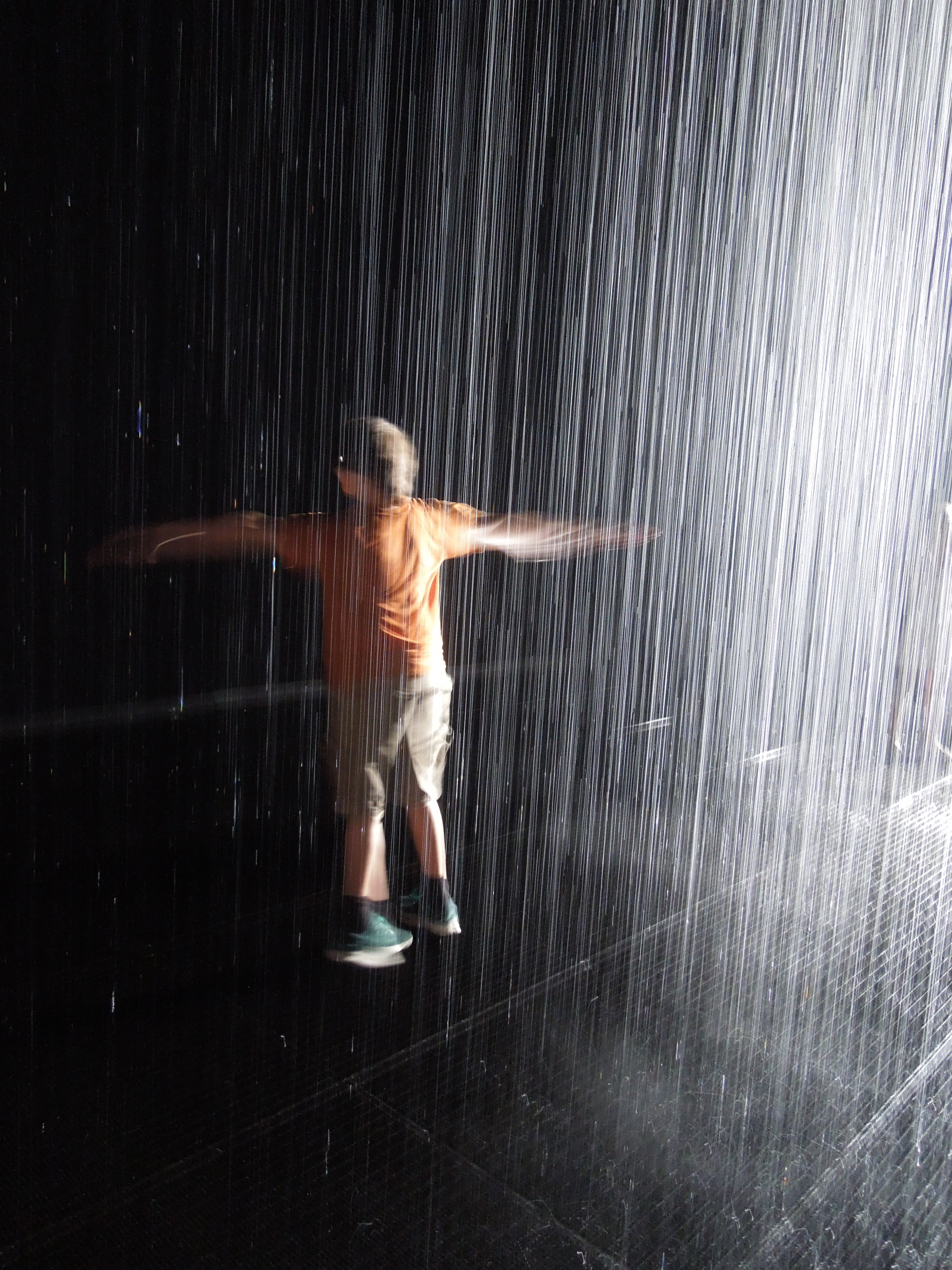
Rain Room downpour at MoMA (2013)

Rain Room allows visitors to the installation to walk through a downpour without getting wet. Motion sensors detect visitors' movements as they navigate through the darkened space, becoming "performers in this intersection of art, technology and nature".

This site-specific sound and light installation uses 2,500 litres of self-cleaning recycled water, controlled through a system of 3D tracking cameras placed around the ceiling. The cameras detect a visitor's movement and signal groups of the water nozzles in the ceiling, stopping the flow of water in a roughly six-foot radius around the person.

Founded in 2005, Random International is a London-based collaborative studio for experimental and digital practice within contemporary art. Their work, which includes sculpture, performance and large-scale architectural installations, reflects the relationship between man and machine and centres on audience interaction.

Sharjah’s Rain Room is the work's Middle Eastern debut and the first installation of the project in a purpose-built, permanent structure. The work was previously shown at the Barbican, London (2012); MoMA, New York (2013); Yuz Museum, Shanghai (2015); LACMA, Los Angeles (2015–2017) and MoCA Busan, Busan (2019).

== Sharjah ==
Sharjah Art Foundation constructed a purpose-built visitor centre located in the city's residential area of Al Majarrah to house the permanent installation of Rain Room, with up to six visitors at a time taking fifteen minutes to explore the experience. Tickets are sold online for scheduled visits and cost Dhs25 for adults.

Opened in May 2018 by Ruler of Sharjah Dr Sheikh Sultan Bin Mohammad Al Qasimi together with Shaikha Hoor Bint Sultan Al Qasimi, president of Sharjah Art Foundation, Rain Room is part of the Sharjah Art Foundation Collection and the first of a series of artist-designed permanent spaces planned for Sharjah.

At the Sharjah inauguration, Koch and Ortkrass commented, "That Rain Room has found a permanent home at Sharjah Art Foundation is a humbling thought. The organisation [Sharjah Art Foundation] is unparalleled in its approach to art, exhibition-making and relationships with a wider public audience."

== Previous installations ==
Kate Bush (curator), Head of Art Galleries, Barbican Centre, said: "The Curve has previously played host to guitar-playing finches, a World War II bunker and a digital bowling alley. Random International have created a new work every bit as audacious and compelling – Rain Room surpasses all our expectations."

"At the cutting edge of digital technology, Rain Room is a carefully choreographed downpour – a monumental installation that encourages people to become performers on an unexpected stage, whilst creating an intimate atmosphere of contemplation. The work also invites us to explore what role science, technology and human ingenuity might play in stabilising our environment by rehearsing the possibilities of human adaptation."

Timeout described Rain Room at the Barbican as "one of the most popular art installations of the past few years. It was incredible, featuring endlessly dripping water that magically avoided you as you walked through it."

Despite being dubbed "Wildly successful" at the Barbican, Business Insider reviewed the Rain Room at MoMA as "Not worth the wait", their reviewer having spent over three hours queuing for a ten minute 'experience'. However, Gizmodo called it a "blockbuster" and "the kind of installation that museums dream of".

== See also ==
- Interactive art
