= I/O The Tour =

2023 concert tour by Peter Gabriel

- Tour by Peter Gabriel
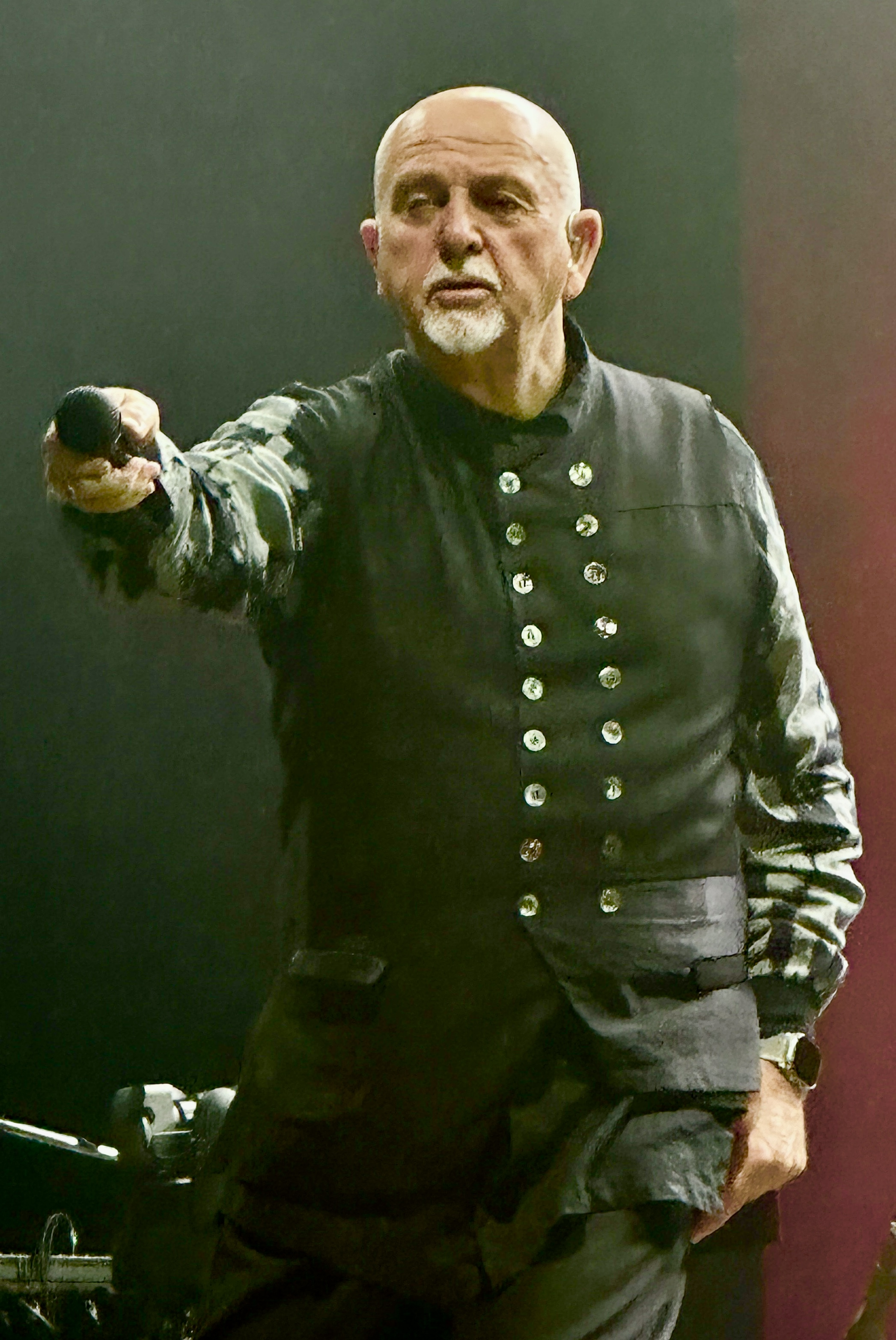
- Gabriel in Denver Colorado, 2023.
- Location: Europe; North America
- Associated album: I/O
- Start date: 18 May 2023
- End date: 21 October 2023
- Legs: 2
- No. of shows: 47

Peter Gabriel concert chronology
- Rock Paper Scissors Tour (2016); i/o The Tour (2023)

I/O The Tour was a concert tour by the English musician Peter Gabriel. The tour started on 18 May 2023 in Kraków, Poland, and ended on 21 October in Houston, United States. It was Gabriel's first tour since his joint-performance with Sting on the Rock Paper Scissors Tour in 2016 and his first solo tour since the Back to Front Tour in 2014. Six weeks after the end of the tour, Gabriel released his album I/O.

The set list contained material from Gabriel's then unreleased i/o album, including "Panopticom", "The Court", "Playing for Time", "i/o", and "Four Kinds of Horses", which had been released as singles prior to the start of the tour. These songs, along with "Road to Joy", "Olive Tree", "This Is Home", "And Still", and "Live and Let Live" premiered at the Tauron Arena in Poland. Another song, "So Much", debuted on May 30 in Copenhagen at the Royal Arena. "Love Can Heal", which was first played during the Rock Paper Scissors Tour, later appeared on i/o along with the ten aforementioned songs. At certain performances, "What Lies Ahead" was also performed, having debuted during Gabriel's Back to Front Tour in 2014, although the song ultimately did not appear on i/o. The remaining songs in the set list comprised material from Gabriel's previous albums, including five tracks from So.

== Staging ==
Robert Lepage, who previously worked with Gabriel as the stage director for the Secret World Tour in 1993–1994 and the Growing Up Tour in 2003–2004, assisted with the creative direction of i/o The Tour. When determining appropriate set pieces, Lepage and Gabriel sought to incorporate a visual representation of the moon into the performance to reflect the latter's decision to release one song from the i/o album every full moon. They expanded on this imagery by creating other planets and celestial objects to augment the stage design.

When assembling his touring band, Gabriel enlisted the help of Tony Levin, David Rhodes, Manu Katché, and Richard Evans, all of whom had previously performed live with Gabriel. Brian Eno introduced Gabriel was introduced to Don-E, who joined the touring band after playing synth bass on the studio recording of "Road to Joy". Josh Shpak became a member of the touring band after one of Gabriel's engineers, Oli Jacobs, was visiting a flatmate and overheard Shpak playing the trumpet. Gabriel also recruited Ayanna Witter-Johnson and Marina Moore to contribute strings and vocals.

With the exception of Gabriel, who used a wireless DPA 4288 headset microphone, the touring members were equipped with Shure 98H/C headset microphones during the acoustic portion of the set. For the remainder of the show, the band switched over to Audix OM6 vocal mics. Britannia Row Productions supplied the concert sound system for both legs of the tour. Rhodes used a Gibson Robot Guitar, a Gibson Goldtop, a James Trussart Tele, a Steinberger 12, and a semi-acoustic Gibson as his primary guitars. He also played a Blade Guitar on "Red Rain". Members of the production team including the sound engineers, lighting technicians and camera crew donned orange flight suits and the band members wore trench coats.

== Synopsis ==
The tour was split into two sets with no opening act. Gabriel began each performance by lighting a campfire situated at the front of the stage. Starting with Tony Levin, members of Gabriel's touring band joined him in a semicircle around the campfire behind a projection of the moon to play either "Washing of the Water" or "Here Comes the Flood" depending on the performance. On "Washing of the Water", the rest of the band would join in for the song's final chorus, with David Rhodes playing a Guild acoustic baritone guitar. The band would remain in the semicircle configuration for the next song, "Growing Up", after which the band dispersed throughout the stage to play the remainder of the first set, with Manu Katché moving from a Roland HandSonic to a set of Yamaha Drums with Zildjian cymbals.

The stage was augmented by LED screens displaying artwork that Gabriel selected to represent each song. Gabriel then performed three songs from i/o, including "Panopticom", "Four Kinds of Horses", and "i/o" and prefaced them with explanations of their origins. These songs were followed by "Digging in the Dirt", which showcased trumpet playing from Josh Shpak. After a series of additional songs from Gabriel's i/o album, the first set concluded with "Sledgehammer", where Gabriel pretended to strike his head with clenched fists imitating sledgehammers and danced in tandem with Levin and Rhodes.

"Darkness" served as the opener of the second set, where Gabriel performed behind a transparent scrim, sometimes with only his silhouette visible. Gabriel continued to position himself behind the scrim for "Love Can Heal", where a painting by Antony Micallef was also displayed. "Road to Joy" followed, which featured artwork by Ai Weiwei. Three songs from So were also played during the latter portion of the set starting with "Don't Give Up", with Ayanna Witter-Johnson covering Kate Bush's vocals. "Solsbury Hill" served as the set closer and was one of the few songs from Gabriel's first four albums included in the setlist. With the exception of certain performances at the end of the North American leg, where "The Tower That Ate People" was played as the first encore, "In Your Eyes" fulfilled that role instead. At certain points of the song, LED screens behind the stage displayed projections of the band's zoomed-in eyeballs. The final encore for every show was "Biko". During the song's outro, the band exited the stage one by one until only Katché remained.

== Set list ==
This set list is representative of the performance on 25 June 2023. It does not represent all concerts for the duration of the tour.

During tour stops in Germany and Switzerland, Gabriel replaced "Washing of the Water" with "Jetzt Kommt Die Flut", a German rendition of "Here Comes the Flood". He also occasionally performed the song in English during the North American leg of the tour. Gabriel played "What Lies Ahead" during the first three tour stops, but the song was dropped from the setlist until his performance in Denver on 16 October 2023; he continued to perform it for the remainder of the tour with the exception of his Dallas show on 19 October 2023. "So Much" was played five times during the tour, with the first occurring on May 30 in Copenhagen. The song did not reappear in the set until his performance on 16 October 2023 in Denver, after which he played it for all remaining shows of the tour. Gabriel played "The Tower That Ate People" on September 25 during his Columbus performance, where it appeared as the penultimate song of the first set. The song resurfaced again on October 14 and was repositioned as the first encore.

=== Set 1 ===
1. "Washing of the Water" (occasionally replaced with "Here Comes the Flood")
2. "Growing Up"
3. "Panopticom"
4. "Four Kinds of Horses"
5. "i/o"
6. "Digging in the Dirt"
7. "Playing for Time"
8. "Olive Tree"
9. "This Is Home"
10. "Sledgehammer"

=== Set 2 ===
1. "Darkness"
2. "Love Can Heal"
3. "Road to Joy"
4. "Don't Give Up" (with Ayanna Witter-Johnson)
5. "The Court"
6. "Red Rain"
7. "And Still" (replaced with "So Much" and "What Lies Ahead" at the end of North American leg)
8. "Big Time"
9. "Live and Let Live"
10. "Solsbury Hill"

Encore:

1. "The Tower That Ate People" (appeared as the first encore at the end of the North American leg)
2. "In Your Eyes"
3. "Biko"

== Musicians ==
- Peter Gabriel – vocals, keyboards, tambourine
- Tony Levin – bass guitar, upright bass, Chapman stick, synthesizer, vocals
- David Rhodes – guitar, vocals
- Richard Evans – guitar, flutes, tin whistle in D, vocals
- Don-E – keyboards, vocals
- Manu Katché – drums
- Marina Moore – violin, viola, vocals
- Ayanna Witter-Johnson – cello, keyboards, vocals
- Josh Shpak – trumpet, French horn, EWI, keyboards, vocals

== Tour dates ==
List of 2023 concerts
Date	City	Country	Venue
18 May 2023	Kraków	Poland	Tauron Arena
20 May 2023	Verona	Italy	Verona Arena
21 May 2023	Milan	Italy	Mediolanum Forum
23 May 2023	Paris	France	Accor Arena
24 May 2023	Lille	France	Decathlon Arena – Stade Pierre-Mauroy
26 May 2023	Berlin	Germany	Waldbühne
28 May 2023	Munich	Germany	Königsplatz
30 May 2023	Copenhagen	Denmark	Royal Arena
31 May 2023	Stockholm	Sweden	Avicii Arena
2 June 2023	Bergen	Norway	Koengen
5 June 2023	Amsterdam	Netherlands	Ziggo Dome
6 June 2023	Antwerp	Belgium	Sportpaleis
8 June 2023	Zurich	Switzerland	Hallenstadion
10 June 2023	Cologne	Germany	Lanxess Arena
12 June 2023	Hamburg	Germany	Barclays Arena
13 June 2023	Frankfurt	Germany	Festhalle Frankfurt
15 June 2023	Bordeaux	France	Arkéa Arena
17 June 2023	Birmingham	England	Utilita Arena
19 June 2023	London	England	The O2 Arena
22 June 2023	Glasgow	Scotland	OVO Hydro
23 June 2023	Manchester	England	AO Arena
25 June 2023	Dublin	Ireland	3Arena
8 September 2023	Quebec City	Canada	Videotron Centre
9 September 2023	Ottawa	Canada	Canadian Tire Centre
11 September 2023	Toronto	Canada	Scotiabank Arena
13 September 2023	Montreal	Canada	Bell Centre
14 September 2023	Boston	United States	TD Garden
16 September 2023	Philadelphia	United States	Wells Fargo Center
18 September 2023	New York City	United States	Madison Square Garden
20 September 2023	Washington, D.C.	United States	Capital One Arena
22 September 2023	Buffalo	United States	KeyBank Center
23 September 2023	Pittsburgh	United States	PPG Paints Arena
25 September 2023	Columbus	United States	Nationwide Arena
27 September 2023	Cleveland	United States	Rocket Mortgage FieldHouse
29 September 2023	Detroit	United States	Little Caesars Arena
30 September 2023	Chicago	United States	United Center
2 October 2023	Milwaukee	United States	Fiserv Forum
3 October 2023	Saint Paul	United States	Xcel Energy Center
7 October 2023	Vancouver	Canada	Rogers Arena
8 October 2023	Seattle	United States	Climate Pledge Arena
11 October 2023	San Francisco	United States	Chase Center
13 October 2023	Los Angeles	United States	Kia Forum
14 October 2023	Palm Springs	United States	Acrisure Arena
16 October 2023	Denver	United States	Ball Arena
18 October 2023	Austin	United States	Moody Center
19 October 2023	Dallas	United States	American Airlines Center
21 October 2023	Houston	United States	Toyota Center

=== Canceled show ===
Date	City	Country	Venue	Reason for cancellation
20 June 2023	Nottingham	England	Motorpoint Arena	Logistical problems
