= Live and Let Live (Peter Gabriel song) =

Single by Peter Gabriel

from the album I/O
- Released: 27 November 2023
- Genre: Progressive pop
- Length: 6:46 (bright-side mix); 7:11 (dark-side and in-side mixes)
- Label: Real World; EMI (UK/Japan); Republic (US/Canada)
- Songwriter: Peter Gabriel
- Producer: Peter Gabriel

Peter Gabriel singles chronology
"And Still" (2023)	"Live and Let Live" (2023)	"Been Undone" (2026)

"Live and Let Live" is a song by English musician Peter Gabriel, first released on 27 November 2023 as the final single released in promotion of his tenth studio album I/O, four days before the record's release. It is the final track on the record; the dark-side and in-side mixes of the track are also extended by an additional 25 seconds. The artwork for the single was designed by Nick Cave with his piece "Soundsuit". During Gabriel's 2023 I/O The Tour, "Live and Let Live" was included in the setlist. Performances of the song featured extensive multicoloured illumination.

== Background ==
According to Gabriel, "Live and Let Live" is about forgiveness, tolerance, and optimism. The track was described by Gabriel as "a joyous, rousingly-positive, closing note for the album". Elaborating on this, Gabriel stated:

"If we look at what's happening in the Middle East now or in Ukraine, all sorts of places around the world where there's still violence and brutality, to walk around with a bunch of flowers, preaching forgiveness seems trite and pathetic, maybe. But in the long run, I think people have to find a way. 'Peace only happens when you respect the rights of others' is a quote from the Peace University in Costa Rica and I think that's a really important message for me and for my life. You either belong to that hurt or you free yourself and forgiveness is clearly a super effective way of freeing yourself."

The track pertains to love and forgiveness, with Gabriel saying that he wrote the track with Nelson Mandela and Desmond Tutu in mind. Both of these individuals were members of The Elders, a group that was initiated by Gabriel and Richard Branson.

== Recording ==
"Live and Let Live" was the last track that Gabriel finished for i/o. Gabriel started the song with some guitars and keyboards played over a hi-hat pattern. He then augmented this instrumentation with the melody for the "this is what we do" section, where a few different lyrical ideas were attempted. Later that day, Gabriel wrote the ending section, which he described as featuring a "simple motif". Gabriel tried three different verse ideas until he developed one that he was satisfied with. During the COVID-19 lockdowns, Gabriel saw a video of Paolo Fresu covering his song "What Lies Ahead", so Gabriel invited him into the recording studio to try out some ideas. Fresu's trumpet playing on "Live and Let Live" marked his only appearance on the album.

Gabriel thought that "the groove didn't settle" on "Live and Let Live", so he accessed some drum tracks that Steve Gadd had recorded a few year prior. One of Gabriel's engineers had looped the drum tracks, and Gabriel found that one of the loops worked well for "Live and Let Live", so Gadd gave him permission to use it. Gadd's drums, which he played with brushes, were placed at the beginning of the song, whereas the ending drums were played by Manu Katché. Some orchestral overdubs and vocals from the Soweto Gospel Choir augment the ending of the song, with Victor Makhathini providing Zulu vocal improvisations and Phumla Nkhumeleni contributing some ululations and chants. The Soweto Gospel Choir had also appeared on Gabriel's "Road to Joy" and "i/o" from the i/o album.

== Critical reception ==
"Live and Let Live" generally received mixed reviews from music reviewers, with most of the criticism being levied against the lyrics. Sam Sodomsky of Pitchfork called it an "emphatic protest song" but questioned the inclusion of the adage "an eye for an eye makes the whole world blind". Writing for Slant Magazine, Steve Erikson admired the earnestness of "Live and Let Live" but felt that the song was full of platitudes. John Lewis of Uncut similarly thought that the song was "sincere and well-meaning" but questioned how realistic disarmament was in the context of the Russo-Ukrainian War and also criticised the vagueness surrounding the lyric "it takes courage to learn to forgive." In their review for I/O, Mark Beaumont of Classic Rock magazine felt that "Live and Let Live" demonstrated Gabriel's proclivity for promoting world-healing and exercising forgiveness. Writing for The i Paper, Ed Power thought that the song's message of "love and understanding [was] so condescendingly on the nose, the listener’s nostrils may recoil."

== Personnel ==
- Peter Gabriel – lead vocals, backing vocals, piano, synths, programming, tambourine
- David Rhodes – guitars
- Tony Levin – bass
- Manu Katché – drums
- Melanie Gabriel – backing vocals
- Brian Eno – additional synths, morph kit
- Oli Jacobs – programming
- Katie May – clay pot
- Richard Chappell – programming
- Paolo Fresu – trumpet
- Steve Gadd – brush loop

Orchestra

- Orchestral arrangement: John Metcalfe and Peter Gabriel
- Violins: Everton Nelson, Ian Humphries, Louisa Fuller, Charles Mutter, Cathy Thompson, Natalia Bonner, Richard George, Marianne Haynes, Martin Burgess, Clare Hayes, Debbie Widdup, and Odile Ollagnon
- Violas: Bruce White, Fiona Bonds, Peter Lale, and Rachel Roberts
- Cellos: Ian Burdge (including solo cello), Chris Worsey, Caroline Dale, William Schofield, Tony Woollard, and Chris Allan
- Double bass: Chris Laurence, Stacy Watton, and Lucy Shaw
- Flute: Eliza Marshall
- French horn: David Pyatt, Richard Bissill
- Tenor trombone: Andy Wood, Tracy Holloway
- Bass trombone: Richard Henry
- Tuba: David Powell
- Orchestra conductor: John Metcalfe
- Orchestra leader: Everton Nelson
- Sheet music supervisor: Dave Foster
- Orchestra contractor: Lucy Whalley and Susie Gillis

Choir

- The Soweto Gospel Choir
- Soprano: Linda Sambo, Nobuhle Dhlamini, Phello Jiyane, Victoria Sithole
- Alto: Maserame Ndindwa, Phumla Nkhumeleni, Zanele Ngwenya, Duduzile Ngomane
- Tenor: George Kaudi, Vusimuzi Shabalala, Xolani Ntombela, Victor Makhathini
- Bass: Thabang Mkhwanazi, Goodwill Modawu, Warren Mahlangu, Fanizile Nzuza
- Soloists: Phello Jiyane (Soprano), Duduzile Ngomane (Alto), Vusimuzi Shabalala (Tenor), Fanizile Nzuza (Bass), Victor Makhathini (Male voice Zulu improvisations), Phumla Nkhumeleni (Female ululating and chanting)
- Musical director / vocal arranger: Bongani (Honey) Ncube

== Charts ==
Chart performance for "Live and Let Live"
Chart (2023)	Peak position
German Downloads (Offizielle Download Top 100)	52
UK Singles Downloads (OCC)	74
