= Road to Joy =

Road to Joy may refer to:

- Road to Joy (Bright Eyes song)
- Road to Joy (Peter Gabriel song)
