= Olive Tree (song) =

Single by Peter Gabriel

from the album I/O
- Released: 1 August 2023 (bright-side mix); 16 August 2023 (dark-side and in-side mixes)
- Studio: Real World (Wiltshire); The Beehive (London); British Grove (London)
- Genre: Alternative rock
- Length: 5:59
- Label: Real World; EMI (UK/Japan); Republic (US/Canada)
- Songwriter: Peter Gabriel
- Producer: Peter Gabriel

Peter Gabriel singles chronology
"So Much" (2023)	"Olive Tree" (2023)	"Love Can Heal" (2023)

"Olive Tree" is a song by English musician Peter Gabriel, released in August 2023 as the eighth single in promotion of his tenth studio album I/O. Since August had a blue moon in 2023, this was the first of two tracks that was released in August, the other being "Love Can Heal". Three different mixes were released starting with the Bright-Side Mix on 1 August 2023, mixed by Spike Stent. The Dark-Side and In-Side mixes followed later that month, which were mixed by Tchad Blake and Hans-Martin Buff respectively. Gabriel said of the song, "I wanted it to have some speed to it but I also wanted some mystery, too. I think it is a celebration in a way and there's a real sense of being alive."

== Background ==
Similar to the title track, "i/o", "Olive Tree" is about being "plugged into nature and other minds". Gabriel said that the song's message is about being "connected". He said that people "only want to see and listen to the things that seem important and relevant to us and shut out the noise of everything else." The narrative of the song is about being attuned to others' thoughts, which is expressed in Gabriel's hope that "we're no longer these islands that have our own private thoughts." "Olive Tree" is "also part of a separate brain-related project" that Gabriel was working on at the time. He took further inspiration from the brain research conducted by Jack Gallant at University of California, Berkeley, and Mary Lou Jepsen at Openwater.

The cover artwork was created by Barthélémy Toguo and titled Chroniques avec la Nature, which depicts a fish and humanoid figure. Unlike most of the other artwork for i/o, this cover art is an original piece, created specifically for this track. Gabriel had first met Toguo in 2015 at WOMAD, where he was serving as an artist-in-residence. Toguo's Chroniques avec la Nature was also showcased onstage for Gabriel's live performances promoting the album.

In 2025, a music video created by Oranguerillatan was released to coincide with the launch of Gabriel's 50:50 platform, which was meant to facilitate engagement with visual artists by showcasing their work. Gabriel had hosted a competition around the release of i/o enlisting other artists to create a music video for one of his songs using artificial intelligence, with Oranguerillatan being one of the winners of that competition.

== Recording ==
The basic tracks for "Olive Tree" were recorded at Gabriel's Real World Studios around 2018, with additional overdubs taking place at The Beehive and the British Grove Studios in London. Gabriel began the song with some chord ideas built around an MPC groove, which yielded the song's pre-chorus. He said that the MPC added some "muscle" to the track, which augmented a shaker and various percussion instruments recorded by Ged Lynch, who overdubbed his parts early on in the recording process. Gabriel and Oli Jacobs, who engineered the track along with Katie May, continued work on the demo, which included the pre-chorus and a different chorus that was later discarded.

In 2021, a band session was arranged with David Rhodes, Tony Levin, and Manu Katché. The recording from this session was nearly two minutes longer than the final versions that appeared on the album. Gabriel explained that his modus operandi was to facilitate creativity by recording long takes to provide musicians an opportunity to open up their playing. Josh Shpak recorded his trumpet parts at his home studio in the summer of 2022. After a meeting with Gabriel and Jacobs over FaceTime, Shpak arranged a few horn parts and recorded around 15 tracks to create the impression of a "huge horn section".

== Critical reception ==
"Olive Tree" has received mostly positive reviews, with some critics taking note of the brass arrangement found on the song's chorus. In his review for The Guardian, Alexis Petridis highlighted the song's "hint of 80s brashness" in the horn orchestration. Steve Erikson of Slant Magazine felt that the song "recycle[d] similar sounds from 'Sledgehammer' and 'Big Time'", particularly with the horns. Helen Brown of The Independent characterised the song as a "bombastic banger" that "peaks with a fanfare of brass parping out the glory of it all." Writing for The i Paper, Ed Power described "Olive Tree" as "joyously jaunty" and likened it to "You Can Call Me Al" by Paul Simon. The track was described by Louder as "uptempo" and "jaunty".

== Personnel ==
- Peter Gabriel – lead vocals, backing vocals, piano, synths, rhythm programming
- David Rhodes – electric, acoustic, and twelve-string guitars, backing vocals
- Tony Levin – bass
- Manu Katché – drums
- Ged Lynch – percussion
- Richard Evans – mandolin
- Evan Smith – saxophone
- Josh Shpak – trumpet
- John Metcalfe – orchestral conductor
- Richard Chappell – rhythm programming
- Oli Jacobs – engineering
- Katie May – engineering

Orchestra

- Orchestral arrangement: John Metcalfe
- Violins: Everton Nelson, Ian Humphries, Louisa Fuller, Charles Mutter, Cathy Thompson, Natalia Bonner, Richard George, Marianne Haynes, Martin Burgess, Clare Hayes, Debbie Widdup, and Odile Ollagnon
- Violas: Bruce White, Fiona Bonds, Peter Lale, and Rachel Roberts
- Cellos: Ian Burdge, Chris Worsey, Caroline Dale, William Schofield, Tony Woollard, and Chris Allan
- Double bass: Chris Laurence, Stacy Watton, and Lucy Shaw
- Orchestra conductor: John Metcalfe
- Orchestra leader: Everton Nelson
- Sheet music supervisor: Dave Foster
- Orchestra contractor: Lucy Whalley and Susie Gillis

== Charts ==
Chart performance for "Olive Tree"
Chart (2023)	Peak position
UK Singles Downloads (Official Charts)	78
