= And Still =

And Still may refer to:

- And Still (Reba McEntire song), 1995
- And Still (Peter Gabriel song), 2023
