= So Much =

So Much may refer to:

- "So Much" (Raghav song), 2010, featuring Kardinal Offishall
- So Much (Peter Gabriel song)
- "So Much", a song by The Sundays on their album Static & Silence
- "So Much", a 1994 book by British author Trish Cooke
- The English translation of the album Tanto by Spanish singer-songwriter Pablo Alborán
