= Nick Cave (artist) =

American visual artist, sculptor, dancer, and performance artist (born 1959)

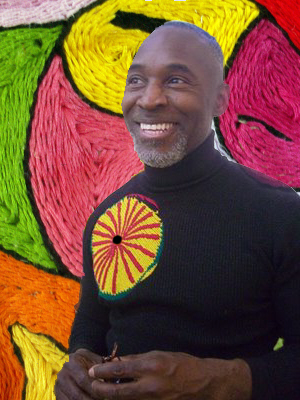
- Born: February 4, 1959 (age 67); Fulton, Missouri, US
- Education: Kansas City Art Institute (BFA); Alvin Ailey American Dance Theater; Cranbrook Academy of Art (MFA); University of North Texas
- Known for: Performance art, sculpture
- Notable work: Soundsuit series
- Website: nickcaveart.com/Main/Intro.html

Nick Cave (born February 4, 1959) is an American sculptor, painter, dancer, performance artist, and professor. He is best known for his Soundsuit series: wearable assemblage fabric sculptures that are bright, whimsical, and other-worldly, often made with found objects. He also trained as a dancer with Alvin Ailey and often incorporates dance and performance into his works. His later sculptures have focused on color theory and included mixed media and large-scale installations. He lives in Chicago, Illinois, and directs the graduate fashion program at the School of the Art Institute of Chicago. He continues to work on Soundsuits as well as works completed as a sculptor, dancer, and performance artist.

His first career retrospective museum exhibition was at the Museum of Contemporary Art, Chicago, May 14, 2022 – October 2, 2022, and at the Solomon R. Guggenheim Museum in New York, November 18, 2022 – April 10, 2023. He received an honorary Doctor of Fine Arts degree from the Rhode Island School of Design in June 2022.

== Early life and education ==
Nick Cave was raised in Fulton, Missouri, alongside six brothers by a single mother who encouraged Cave's interest in fashion. His grandparents owned a farm in Chariton, Missouri, where Cave would sometimes help care for crops and chickens. He attributes much of his interests in found objects and assemblage to his childhood circumstances. After primary school Cave moved from Fulton to the larger college town of Columbia, Missouri. There he attended West Junior High School and graduated from Hickman High School in 1977. He credits a mentor art teacher at Hickman with suggesting he enroll in the Kansas City Art Institute, where he would study fiber arts and later earn a Bachelor of Fine Arts in 1982. In 1979, Cave met Alvin Ailey and spent that summer and several summers thereafter in New York, where he studied with the Alvin Ailey American Dance Theatre. After graduating from the Kansas City Art Institute in 1982, he designed displays for the department store, Macy's, and worked professionally as a fashion designer while maintaining his interest in art and dance.

In 1988, Cave earned his M.F.A. degree from Cranbrook Academy of Art in Bloomfield Hills, Michigan. He also did some graduate coursework at the University of North Texas. After graduating from Cranbrook, he went on to teach in a fiber arts program at the Art Institute of Chicago in 1989. Since then, Cave has run a clothing company in Chicago where he designs, manufactures, and markets his own line of men's & women's clothing.

== Creative thought and process ==
Cave's low socio-economic status growing up forced him to repair hand-me-downs from older siblings. He learned to sew, which led to his first Soundsuit. Up until then, his work had nothing to do with the figure or performance art. He explained that he made a sudden shift that would redefine the work he was making.

Influences of African art traditions, armor, ceremonial dress, couture fashion, and designed textiles, as well as stereotypically feminine objects, are present in his work to express a multitude of concepts. Much of his work is in the round, but occasionally he enjoys the dimension created when working with bas-relief, referring to them as paintings. His work deals with strategies to negotiate the real-life stakes of vulnerability and consequence by transforming the experience and environment. With his performance art, he aims to create situations where diverse communities come together to share the experience, making sure to distinguish his pieces as art rather than costumes. Cave describes himself not as an artist but as a messenger as his work frequently deals with spectacle and responsibility. One such work of his that follows this principle is Augment. This piece consists of five assemblages made with more than 1,000 inflatable lawn decorations that are sewn together. The sculptures were on display in the Cyclorama at the Boston Center for the Arts in Boston's South End from August 8, 2019, to September 13, 2019. On September 14, the piece was taken to the streets in the form of a parade with the mission to spread joy through the South End and Upham's Corner neighborhoods in Boston. More than 75 Boston-area artists and performers and 500 members of the public participated in this parade to bridge the gap between the two neighborhoods. At its final location at 555 Columbia Avenue in Upham's corner, the piece spills out through the windows of a custom-designed building wrapped in collages made by members of the Upham's Corner community.

Cave creates most of his pieces in a workshop with several assistants, fabricators, and suppliers, his head assistant being Jen Grygiel. Cave most often commissions fabrication from a shop in Skokie, Illinois, called "Iron and Wire" owned by David Greene.

== Work ==
=== Soundsuits ===
Soundsuit (2009), Smithsonian American Art Museum

Soundsuit (2010), Renwick Gallery

Soundsuits are sculptural costumes enveloping the wearer's body in materials including but not limited to dyed human hair, sisal, plastic buttons, beads, wire, sequins, and feathers. Soundsuits camouflage the body, masking and creating a second skin that conceals race, gender, and class, forcing the viewer to look without judgment. In using everyday objects, Cave can create an atmosphere of familiarity while rearranging the objects into interpretive representations of both social and material culture. As race, identity, and gender are generally accepted to form the axis of his work, Cave's soundsuits can telegraph many concepts simultaneously. Their meaning can therefore change based on their environment, movement, fixed state, and/or the inclusion of group choreography. The finished pieces bear some resemblance to African ceremonial costumes and masks. The suits also reference carnival costumes, Dogon costumes, Rococo, and ball culture.

Cave's first soundsuit was created in 1992, as a reaction to the beating of Rodney King. Cave collected a large number of sticks and twigs from the ground and fashioned them into a suit that, to his surprise, made sounds when worn. His suits are most often presented for public viewing as static sculptures, but they are also observed through live performance, video, and photography. Bringing his interactive creations to life, "Cave regularly performs in the sculptures himself, dancing either before the public or for the camera, activating their full potential as costume, musical instrument, and living icon." He has produced more than 500 soundsuits, since the creation of his first in 1992. He is very much inspired by dance and choreography, which works well with soundsuits because they allow the expression of both arts in one piece. He talks about how he wants his work to be seen without the artist in mind. With the Soundsuits series, the viewer doesn't know the identity, gender, or race of the wearer.

In 2021, Cave was commissioned by the Metropolitan Transportation Authority in New York to create a permanent installation inspired by his soundsuits spanning the Times Square-42nd Street and 42nd Street-Bryant Park subway stations. The work, Each One, Every One, Equal All (2021), consists of a series of mosaic tile murals of imagined and real soundsuits and mobiles created by Cave, along with video installations of the soundsuits in motion. Writing about the installation in The New York Times before its completion in 2022, critic John Vincler described the figures in the work as "joyous" and said the piece "feels like a necessary correction, right at home amid the noise and teem" of the subway.

One of these Soundsuits was chosen by Peter Gabriel to represent his song "Live and Let Live", the final single on his eighth album i/o, released in 2023.

=== HEARD•NY – Soundsuit performance ===
In 2013, Cave worked with the dancers of the Alvin Ailey Dance Company, in which he was formerly a dancer, and created HEARD•NY. This performance took place in one of the city's most bustling thoroughfares, Grand Central Terminal's Vanderbilt Hall. HEARD•NY was not a purely visual spectacle, but a layered commentary on ceremony (particularly, costumed West African ritual), identity, and the place of dreams in civic life.

A herd of 30 colorful life-size horses broke into choreographed movement—or “crossings”— twice a day for just a week and was accompanied by live music. Each suit, made of brightly colored synthetic raffia, was operated by two dancers from the Alvin Ailey Dance Company. The project was presented by Creative Time and MTA Arts for Transit as part of a series of events celebrating the centennial of Grand Central. Cave's soundsuits were created to be seen in motion.

Choreographed performances such as these show the audience what the soundsuits look and sound like in their true form. Soundsuit sculpture is part of the Colección SOLO museum and is shown as part of its permanent exhibition and was part of different temporary exhibitions, such as Certeza (2023), at its museum in Madrid.

=== Mixed media ===
Cave's works outside of his soundsuits are predominantly mixed-media sculptures and large-scale installations that use found objects and brightly colored fabrics. He creates sculptural art that discusses current racial tensions, especially gun violence and its impact on Black men. One such piece is TM 13, a sculpture that responds to the life and 2012 death of Trayvon Martin. After George Zimmerman was acquitted of Martin's murder on July 13, 2013 (hence the title "TM 13"), Cave created a powerful sculpture centering on a hoodie, denim pants, a Black mannequin, and sneakers. The sculpture is conspicuously covered in a net, "creat[ing] a kind of Soundsuit for the ghost of Trayvon Martin. A way for a dead black teenager to make an outcry and an uproar, to protest against his undeserved demise".

Cave's mixed-media sculptures often include black doll or mannequin parts (heads, hands, etc.) placed at the center or top of a piece, creating an altar-like semblance. By focusing his pieces in this manner, viewers of his art can "examine the history of trauma and racism, ... the objectification of the black male". His 2014 exhibition Rescue "inspects the idea of servitude and the accompanying stigma within the Black community". Most of these works are not audible, like his 2016–2017 exhibition Until at MASS MoCa, as Cave wants the exhibition participants "to be included – and implicated – in the work" as opposed to focusing on sound and movement. The act of viewing his works with participants seeing one another at the same time is a metaconcept Cave promotes.

== Teaching career ==
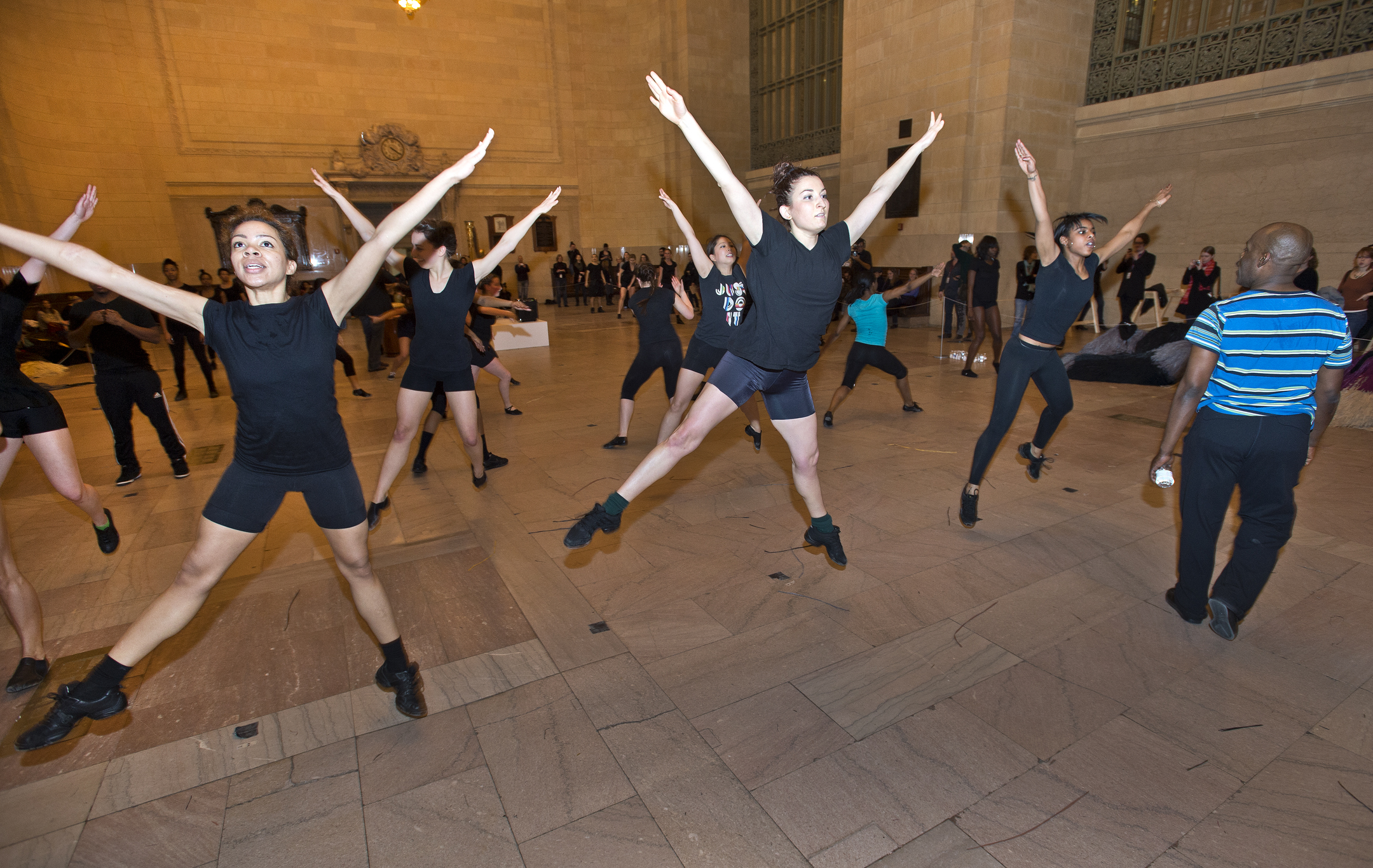
Cave preparing young artists for HEARD-NY performance

Cave has taught extensively at universities across the United States. He began working at the School of the Art Institute of Chicago in 1989 as a professor in the Department of Fiber and Material Studies and was later appointed to the Department of Fashion. As of 2018, he served as the graduate director of the fashion program and chair of the department. He has served as a visiting instructor and artist at a number of other institutions, among them Beloit College, Fabric Workshop & Museum, McColl Center for Art + Innovation, Pilchuck Glass School, University of Arizona, and University of Wisconsin-Madison.

== Exhibitions ==
Cave has participated in numerous solo exhibitions and shows at galleries and museums in the United States and internationally. His solo shows include New Work (1997), Grand Arts, Kansas City, Missouri; Nick Cave: A Quarter Til Ten (2006-2007), Mattress Factory, Pittsburgh; Nick Cave: Meet Me at the Center of the Earth (2009-2012), originating at the Yerba Buena Center for the Arts, San Francisco; Until (2016-2021), originating at the Massachusetts Museum of Contemporary Art, North Adams; and Nick Cave: Truth Be Told (2020-2021), originating at Jack Shainman Gallery, New York. His first museum retrospective, Nick Cave: Forothermore, opened in 2022 at the Museum of Contemporary Art, Chicago, and later travelled to the Solomon R. Guggenheim Museum in New York.

He has also participated in a number of group exhibitions, including the 51st Venice Biennale (2005) and the NGV Triennial (2017-2018). His work also appeared in City in a Garden: Queer Art and Activism in Chicago at the Museum of Contemporary Art (2025-2026) and On Loss and Absence: Textiles of Mourning and Survival at the Art Institute of Chicago (2025-2026).

From February 13, 2026 – January 3, 2027, the Smithsonian American Art Museum exhibited Nick Cave: Mammoth wherein Cave “showcase[s] the ordinary and often forgotten bits and pieces of the world we live in, Cave’s work shines light on what we value and how we make meaning together.” It is reported to be the Smithsonian's largest ever single-artist commission.

== Reception ==
Cave's work has been met with positive reception. Namesake Nick Cave, an Australian rock musician of the band Nick Cave and The Bad Seeds, has spoken positively of the former's work, stating that he has "admired the work of the American artist [...] for many years", and drawing attention to its merits as "an attempt to transmute suffering into a kind of knowing and shielding joy".

== Personal life ==
Cave's husband is fellow designer Bob Faust.

== Notable works in public collections ==
- Metal Ring (c.1995), Philadelphia Museum of Art
- Soundsuit (2005), High Museum of Art, Atlanta
- Soundsuit (2008), Auckland Art Gallery, New Zealand
- Soundsuit (2008), Brooklyn Museum, New York
- Soundsuit (2008), Museum of Fine Arts, Boston
- Soundsuit (2009), Birmingham Museum of Art, Alabama
- Soundsuit (2009), Hirshhorn Museum and Sculpture Garden, Smithsonian Institution, Washington, D.C.
- Soundsuit (2009), San Francisco Museum of Modern Art
- Soundsuit (2009), Smithsonian American Art Museum, Smithsonian Institution, Washington, D.C.
- Soundsuit (2010), Crystal Bridges Museum of American Art, Bentonville, Arkansas
- Soundsuit (2010), Detroit Institute of Arts
- Soundsuit (2010), Minneapolis Institute of Art
- Soundsuit (2010), Smithsonian American Art Museum, Smithsonian Institution, Washington, D.C.
- Soundsuit (2011), Museum of Fine Arts, Houston
- Soundsuit (2011), Museum of Modern Art, New York
- Soundsuit (2011), Weatherspoon Art Museum
- Speak Louder (2011), Museum of Contemporary Art, Chicago
- Speak Louder (2011), Trapholt, Kolding, Denmark
- Property (2014), Nelson-Atkins Museum of Art, Kansas City, Missouri
- Amalgam (brown) (2015), Museum of Modern Art, New York
- Soundsuit (2015), National Gallery of Canada, Ottawa
- Soundsuit (2015), National Gallery of Victoria, Melbourne, Australia
- Each One, Every One, Equal All (2021), Times Square-42nd Street and 42nd Street-Bryant Park stations, Metropolitan Transportation Authority, New York
- Soundsuit 8:46 (2021), Honolulu Museum of Art
- Amalgam (Origin) (2024), Frederik Meijer Gardens & Sculpture Park, Grand Rapids, Michigan
