= Tom Kerstens =

Dutch classical guitarist

Tom Kerstens is a Dutch classical guitarist active in the UK.

Kerstens studied in the Netherlands, Spain and England. He has an advanced degree from the Guildhall School of Music and Drama in London, and a degree in musicology and philosophy from the University of Utrecht.

His UK performing debut came in 1987 at the Greenwich Festival. Since then, he has played at most of the other British festivals, and has toured Europe. His recordings include Fandango!, played on three different types of guitar (baroque, romantic and modern); Serenade, a CD of Romantic guitar music; and three (so far) volumes entitled New Music for Guitar (2004, 2005, 2018). He has also recorded Deirdre Gribbin's guitar piece, The Sanctity of Trees, for a collection of her music.

Kerstens has been Artistic Director and CEO of the International Guitar Foundation since 1995. In this role, he has commissioned over 80 new works for the guitar, including pieces by Philip Cashian, Graham Fitkin, Alastair King, Bruce MacCombie, Edward McGuire, John Metcalfe, Howard Skempton, Joby Talbot, Kevin Volans and Errollyn Wallen.

Kerstens' most recent album, 'Utopia' (2020), is his first with his new G Plus ensemble and was recorded at Peter Gabriel's Real World Studios in Wiltshire, England before being released online exclusively to Bowers & Wilkins Music Club members as a lossless download (high quality digital format).
