= Barthélémy Toguo =

Cameroonian painter

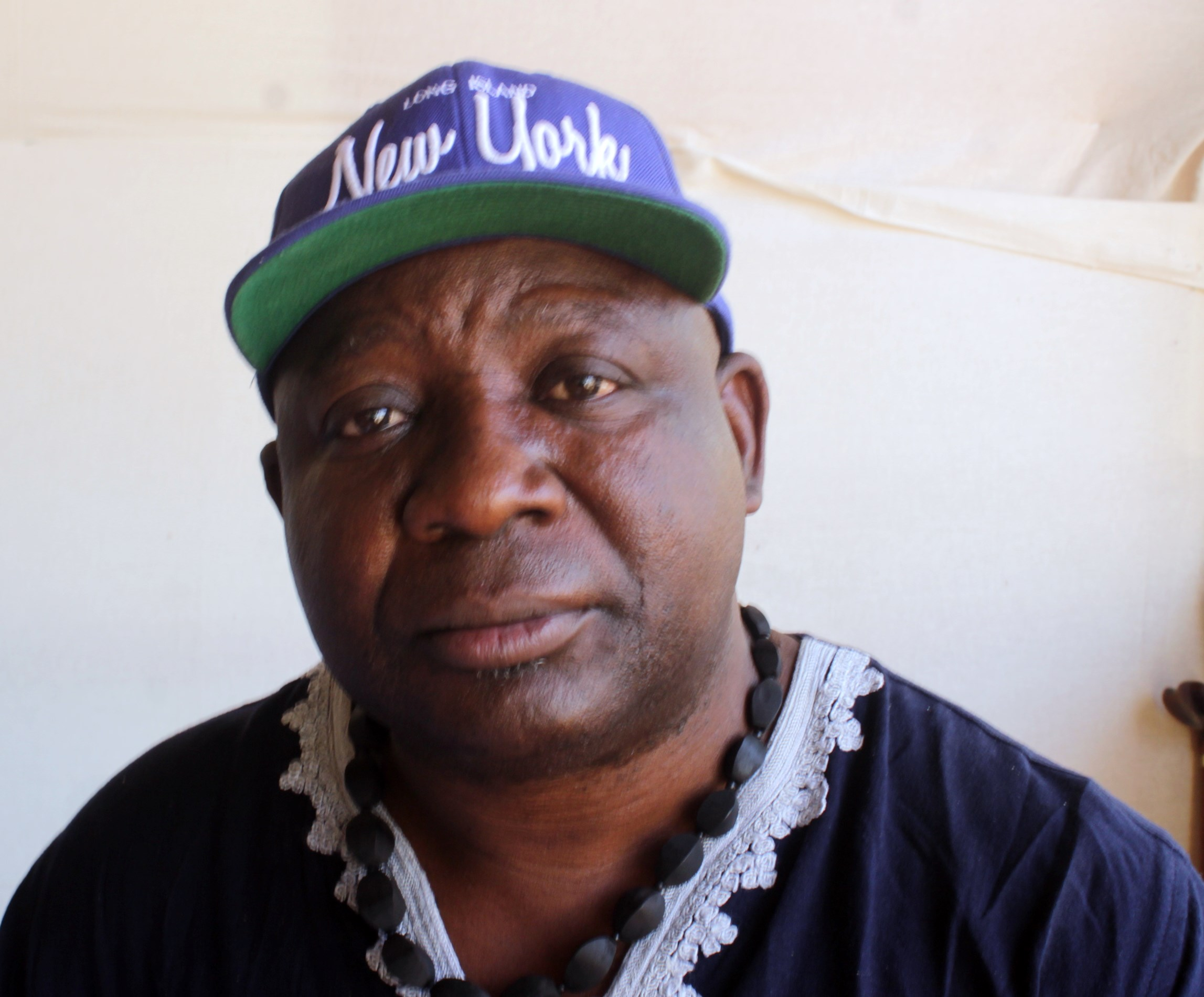
Barthélémy Toguo

Barthélémy Toguo (born 1967) is a Cameroonian painter, visual and performing artist. He currently splits his time living and working in both Paris, France and Bandjoun, Cameroon. He works in a variety of media aside from visual and performing arts including photographs, prints, sculptures, videos, and installations.

== Biography ==
Toguo studied at the National school of Fine Arts in Abidjan, Ivory Coast, at the École supérieure d'Art de Grenoble, France and at the Kunstakademie Düsseldorf, Germany. Some of his paintings are found in The Contemporary African Art Collection (CAAC) of Jean Pigozzi. Starting in 2005 and continuing until completion in 2007, he constructed a cultural project called the Bandjoun Station. It is an art center located in his native Cameroon that includes an exhibition space, a library, an artist residency, and an organic farm. It was made to foster contemporary art and culture within the local community. The station is composed of two distinct buildings divided into different centers that are used for multiple individual purposes. The main building is designed with five armed concrete pillars and topped with a ten meter high gable; this sloped roof respects the traditional architecture or the area. The station is in a location that welcomes all sorts of traditions. People are invited to appropriate this space, to organize festivals for or related to their culture such as burials, births, and even weddings. It is all done in hopes to create social cohesion within the community.

In 2011, Toguo was made a Knight of the Order of Arts and Literature in France for his ongoing engagement and creativity, helping to develop the arts and culture in France and throughout the world, and building bridges between nations with his art. Later in 2016, Toguo was shortlisted for the Prix Marcel Duchamp, France's most high-profile art award. He was awarded a 2018 Inga Maren Otto Fellowship by The Watermill Center in Long Island, New York. During his residency over the summer in 2018, he created some of the works for his exhibition The Beauty of Our Voice, presented at the Parrish Art Museum in Water Mill, New York, from August 5, 2018 to October 14, 2018. His first solo exhibition at an American museum, The Beauty of Our Voice expanded his gaze to the U.S. with new watercolor paintings, installations, photography, performance, and a community art project.

In October 2021, UNESCO Director-General Audrey Azoulay appointed Barthélémy Toguo, UNESCO Artist for Peace.

In Winter 2023 Toguo was promoted to Officer of the Order of Arts and Literature.

== Artwork ==
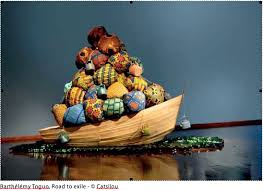
The Road to Exile is the centerpiece to The Beauty of Our Voice series. The installation addresses the migrant and refugee crisis, the desire of young Africans to escape and specifically the desire of young Africans to escape in hopes for a better life.

Toguo is a multiple disciplinary artist whose work addresses migration, colonialism, race, exile and displacement. He started off reproducing classic European sculpture until 1992 where he took up woodcarving. At Grenoble he discovered photography and video and experiments with German realism. Later at Dusseldorf, he becomes interested in performance art and in 1996 Toguo performs his Transit series. In the late 1990s he began his exploration with watercolor. These watercolors were inspired by his travels and experiences and then evolved even more when he discovered his fascination with passports and their stamps. The passport had the ability to document an individual's travels across borders. This small book contains a variety of stamps that became a visual mark of the policing of humans. This concept of belonging stems from his dual citizenship in both Cameroon and France. His work has also been informed by the social movements including Black Lives Matter seen in his Black Lives Always Matter series and the refugee crisis seen in The Beauty of Our Voice work.

Aside from the stamps found within passports Barthelemy Toguo is also inspired by post cards. This can be seen within his work in the Head Above Water series. He traveled around the world collecting these cards in order to give the people a voice. He questioned people about their life conditions, current events, wars, and about their hopes and dreams. Toguo would go to these locations including schools, streets, and marketplaces and would gather the answers to his questions. Later, he would go to a local post office and create a postcard and address it to himself. He would not actually mail them but would rather keep them and carry them around with him on his trips.

In August 2023, his artwork Chroniques avec la Nature was used as the cover artwork for the Peter Gabriel song "Olive Tree", from his forthcoming album i/o.

== Exhibitions ==
Toguo’s work is in the collections of the Museum of Modern Art, and the Studio Museum in Harlem, New York; the Pérez Art Museum Miami, Florida; Centre Georges Pompidou, Paris; Musée d’art contemporain, Lyon; Fondation Louis Vuitton; and Kunstsammlungen der Stadt, Düsseldorf, among others. Solo exhibitions of his work have been presented at institutions including Uppsala Art Museum, Sweden; Musée d’art moderne et contemporain de Saint-Etienne, France; La Verrière by Hermès, Brussels; Fundaçao Gulbenkian, Lisbon; and Palais de Tokyo, Paris.

Barthelemy Toguo has declined participation in exhibitions because of political views. Such as the time in 2007 when he declined the invitation to join the Venice Biennale. He states, “What guides me is a constantly evolving aesthetic but also a sense of ethics which makes a difference and structures my entire approach. With my private initiative, Bandjoun Station in Cameroon, and the artistic project that accompanies it, I wanted to take on my responsibilities as a man and an artist by offering another model and reference. Under no circumstances whatever should my name be associated with that of Sindika Dokolo or the collection that he has put together over the years." He continues to say that he respects all the other artists that are participating in the project though he will not be joining them.

=== Solo ===
- 2020 Bilongue, Cape Town, South Africa
- 2019 Urban Requiem, Lelong Gallery, New York
- 2018 The Beauty of Our Voice, presented at the Parrish Art Museum, Water Mill, New York, from August 5, 2018 to October 14, 2018. His first solo exhibition at an American museum.
- 2018 Heimatlos, Nosbaum Reding, Luxembourg
- 2017 Fragile Body, Hadrian From Montferrand Gallery, Beijing, China
- 2017 Strange fruit, Lelong & Co Gallery, Paris
- 2016 Strange Fruit, Johannesburg, South Africa
- 2015 2015 Africa, Galerie Samuel Lallous, Montreal
- 2014 The Cost of Living, Musée d’Art et d’Histoire, Narbonne, France
- 2014 A dream place for the orphans, l’Aspirateur Lieu d’art contemporain, Narbonne France.
- 2014 Celebrations, Cape Town, South Africa
- 2013 Hidden Faces, Lelong Gallery, Paris
- 2012 A World Child Looking at the Landscape, Nosbaum & Reding, Luxembourg
- 2011 Criminal Tribunal, Mario Mauroner Contemporary Art, Vienna
- 2004/2005 The Sick Opera, Palais de Tokyo, Paris, France
- 2004 La guerre des sexes n’aura pas lieu, Ecole régionale des Beaux-Arts, Valence, France
- 2003 Pure and Clean, Institute of Visual Arts, Milwaukee, USA
- 1994 European center, Saint-Martin d’Heres, Grenoble, France

=== Group ===
- 2019 Perilous Bodies, Ford Foundation Center for Social Justice, New York, USA
- 2018 Exile, International Museum of the Red Cross and Red Crescent, Geneva, Switzerland
- 2014 Jaume Plensa - Kiki Smith - Bartélémy Toguo, Lelong Gallery, Paris
- 2005 African Art Now : Masterpieces from the Jean Pigozzi Collection, Museum of Fine Arts Houston, USA
- 2005 Hayward Gallery, London, England
- 2005 Centre Georges Pompidou, Paris, France
- 2004 Africa Remix, Art contemporain d’un continent, Museum Kunst Palast, Düsseldorf, Germany
- 2004 Je m’installe aux abattoirs, La collection d’art contemporain d’agnès b., Les Abattoirs, Toulouse, France
- 2003 The American Effect, Global Perspectives on the United States, 1990-2003, Whitney Museum of American Art, New York, USA
