= Soweto Gospel Choir =

South african gospel group (founded 2002)

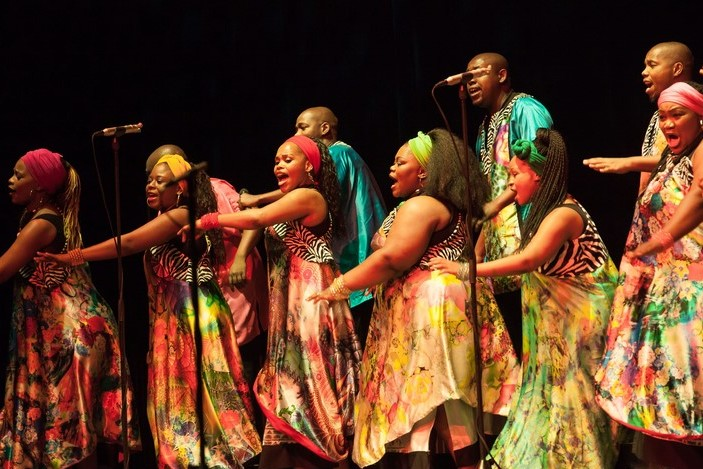
- The choir in Graz, Austria (2014)

Background information
- Origin: Soweto, South Africa
- Genres: Gospel
- Years active: 2002–present
- Label: Shanachie
- Website: sowetogospelchoir.com

The Soweto Gospel Choir is a South African gospel group formed in Soweto in 2002. The choir blends traditional African gospel with spirituals and contemporary influences, often sung in several South African languages.

== History ==
The Soweto Gospel Choir was formed in Soweto, South Africa, by David Mulovhedzi and Beverly Bryer, and producers Andrew Kay, David Vigo and Cliff Hocking in 2002. The more than 30-member ensemble blends elements of African gospel, Negro spirituals, reggae and American popular music. The group performed at the first of the 46664 concerts for Nelson Mandela and has since toured internationally several times.

Their albums Blessed, African Spirit and Freedom won the Grammy Award for Best Traditional World Music Album in 2006, 2007 and 2019, respectively.

On 7 July 2007 they performed at the South African leg of Live Earth. Also in 2007, they joined Robert Plant in contributing to Goin' Home: A Tribute to Fats Domino (Vanguard Records), performing their version of Domino's "Valley of Tears".

The group was featured on the Peter Gabriel/Thomas Newman song "Down to Earth", written for Pixar's 2008 feature film WALL-E. The song was nominated for the Golden Globe Award for Best Original Song at the 66th Golden Globe Awards and the Academy Award for Best Original Song at the 81st Academy Awards.

The group performed at the 2010 FIFA World Cup final draw on 4 December 2009 in Cape Town, South Africa.

In 2010, composer Christopher Tin's song "Baba Yetu", which featured the group, won the Grammy Award for Best Instrumental Arrangement Accompanying Vocalist(s). The song had originally been produced for Firaxis Games's 2005 videogame Civilization IV, but Tin enlisted the Soweto Gospel Choir to re-record the song for inclusion on his debut album, Calling All Dawns, leading to the song's nomination and award. This marked the first time a video game composition had won or been nominated for the category.

The group collaborates with American publishing company MusicSpoke to publish transcriptions of a number of its pieces, including "Balm of Gilead", "Hloholonofatsa", "Ke Na Le Modisa", "Khumbaya", "Shosholoza", "Somlandela" and "Swing Down Sweet Chariot". They appear on Peter Gabriel's tenth studio album, I/O—on its title track, "Road to Joy" and "Live and Let Live".

== Discography ==
- Voices from Heaven (Shanachie Records, 2005)
- Blessed (Shanachie, 2006)
- African Spirit (Shanachie, 2007)
- Grace (Shanachie, 2010)
- Freedom (Shanachie, 2018)
- Hope (Shanachie, 2022)
- History of House (with Latroit and Groove Terminator (Gallo Records, House of Latroit, Music is Fun, 2024)

=== Contributions with Christopher Tin ===
- Calling All Dawns (2009)
- The Drop That Contained the Sea (2014)

=== Other contributions ===
- Goin' Home: A Tribute to Fats Domino (Vanguard Records, 2007)
- "Pray for Me" – off the album Naked (2015) by Nigeria's Darey Art Alade

== Awards and nominations ==
=== ARIA Music Awards ===
The ARIA Music Awards is an annual ceremony presented by Australian Recording Industry Association (ARIA), which recognise excellence, innovation, and achievement across all genres of the music of Australia. They commenced in 1987.

Year	Nominee / work	Award	Result	Ref.
2024	History of House	Best World Music Album	Nominated	
