= This Is Home (Peter Gabriel song) =

Single by Peter Gabriel

from the album I/O
- Released: 29 September 2023 (dark-side mix); 14 October (bright-side and in-side mixes)
- Studio: Real World (Wiltshire); British Grove (London); The Beehive (London); Alfvénsalen (Uppsala)
- Length: 5:04
- Label: Real World; EMI (UK/Japan); Republic (US/Canada)
- Songwriter: Peter Gabriel
- Producer: Peter Gabriel

Peter Gabriel singles chronology
"Love Can Heal" (2023)	"This Is Home" (2023)	"And Still" (2023)

"This Is Home" is a song by English musician Peter Gabriel and was the tenth single from his tenth studio album I/O. Tchad Blake was tasked with creating the song's "Dark-Side Mix", which was released on 29 September 2023. Two different mixes, the bright-side and in-side mixes, were released that same year in October.

== Background ==
According to Gabriel, "This Is Home" is a "love song" that "began with inspiration from some of the great Tamla Motown rhythm sections". Gabriel aimed to emulate the instrumentation of this music by adding handclaps and a tambourine and enveloping it in modern production.

To coincide with the release of "This Is Home", Gabriel released a statement on the track's development, revealing that the song originally featured the involvement of Skrillex, who had contacted Gabriel about collaborating on some music. Skrillex travelled to Gabriel's recording studio to develop various musical ideas, with most of his attention being placed on "This Is Home". While Skrillex had recommended a set of lyrics about "staying up all night in a night club", Gabriel instead decided to orient "This Is Home" around family and domestic life. In a press release, Gabriel explained that he experimented with high vocals to get a more emotional voice in contrast with the conversational voice effect at the beginning of the song, with the intention of putting both intimate and emotive vocals side by side.

The cover was designed by artist David Moreno with his work "Conexión de catedral II". At first, Moreno's piece "La Vie en Rose" was heavily considered, and used in some early promotional material before being switched with Conexión very late before the single's release; As such, Rose is the artwork still used in the i/o Tour Programme, and not Conexión. Gabriel said about the choice of the artwork, "I was looking for contemporary art that represented the house or home in some ways and we saw a few things but his really stuck out."

== Recording ==
"This Is Home" features contributions from Orphei Drängar, a Swedish choir with 90 members. One of the members of the choir, Anton Grönberg, had met Gabriel at the Polar Music Prize awards in 2009. Grönberg's uncle, Tomas Grönberg, had conceived an idea of adding a concert to an International Network of Museums for Peace conference in Uppsala with the goal of recruiting Gabriel as a guest performer. The board of Orphei Dränger told Anton to "gently probe with Gabriel", who then emailed Grönberg three months later about collaborating on a song.

On 10 October 2022, Orphei Dränger recorded their parts for "This Is Home" in their rehearsal room in Alfvénsalen, Uppsala. The members of Orphei Dränger had rehearsed their parts the week prior; with the exception of their director Cecilia Rydinger, they were not shown the recording of "This Is Home" that Gabriel prepared. "All [Rydinger] said was that 'it sounds really nice' and small hints that 'it will sound really good." Rydinger was equipped with a "big headset", which allowed her receive feedback from Gabriel, who was listening to the session remotely. A "grey doll's head" was installed in the room to establish a visual representation of Gabriel. A microphone was also placed in the doll's ears so that Gabriel could hear their parts and provide suggestions.

The doll's head and Cecilia's reaction from the conductor's chair made a sort of alien-like connection with Peter. A one-way direction where we sang the best we could, waited and look[ed] at Cecilia. She got some feedback, said something to the producers, and we did it again with a slight adjustment. And we did this over and over.

— Anton Grönberg

== Critical reception ==
In their review for Variety, Chris Willman characterised "This Is Home" as "a polyrhythmic march" with romantic undertones. John Lewis wrote in Uncut that "This Is Home" transitioned Gabriel's i/o album from "political to personal" territory with its "machine-led funk groove that underpins a warm meditation on hearth and home." Writing for The Guardian, Alexis Petridis said that the "sinuous rhythm" found on "This Is Home" reflected Gabriel's interest in music outside of the western hemisphere. James McNair of Mojo felt that the song carried attributes that signified Gabriel's work, including the "percussive world groove [and] soulful, declamatory vocal." Chris Roberts dismissed "This Is Home" as a filler track in his review for Record Collector.

== Personnel ==
- Peter Gabriel – lead vocals, synthesizers, rhythm programming
- David Rhodes – electric guitar
- Tony Levin – bass
- Manu Katché – drums
- Brian Eno – dreamy piano
- Katie May – snare roll
- Oli Jacobs – OP-1 synthesizer, tambourine, snare sample, additional guitar
- Ríoghnach Connolly – backing vocals

Choir

Orphei Drängar

- First tenors: Per Bergeå Af Geijerstam, Lukas Gavelin, Stefan Grudén, Lionel Guy, Samuel Göranzon, Björn Hagland, Peter Hagland, Henrik Hallingbäck, Magnus Hjerpe, Oskar Johansson, Lars Plahn, Carl Risinger, Alexander Rosenström, Pär Sandberg, Magnus Sjögren, Magnus Store, Stefan Strålsjö, Henrik Sundqvist, Staffan Sundström, Jon Svedin, Olle Terenius, Maki Yamada
- Second tenors: Johan Berglund, Kristian Cardell, Jens Carlander, Jun Young Chung, Joakim Ekedahl, Olle Englund, Nils Frykman, Anton Grönberg, Johan Hedlund, Daniel Hjerpe, Fredrik Kjellröier, Kristofer Klerfalk, Nils Klöfver, Mattias Lundblad, Per-Henning Olsson, Peter Stockhaus, Peter Stureson, Anders Sundin, Erik Sylvén, Clas Tegerstrand, Magnus Törnerud, Sebastian Ullmark, Oskar Wetterqvist, Erik Östblom
- First basses: Jonas Andersson, Filip Backström, Nils Bergel, Rickard Carlsson, Daniel Dahlborg, Oloph Demker, Nils Edlund, Erik Hartman, Lars Johansson Brissman, Elis Jörpeland, Jan Magnusson, Johan Morén, Tobias Neil, David Nogerius, Stein Norheim, Jacob Risberg, Stefan Simon, Henrik Stolare, Tor Thomsson, Håkan Tribell, Gunnar Wall, Fredrik Wetterqvist, Kristofer Zetterqvist, Samuel Åhman
- Second basses: Gustav Alberius, Lars Annernäs, Emil Bengtsson, Anders Bergendahl, Peter Bladh, Max Block, Ludwig Engblom Strucke, Stefan Ernlund, Fredrik Hoffmann, Boris Klanger, Adam Liifw, Andreas Lundquist, Marcus Lundwall, Joakim Lücke, Johan Muskala, Björn Niklasson, Mattias Nilsson, Elias Norrby, Ola Olén, Carl Sandberg, Magnus Schultzberg, Anand Sharma, Isak Sköld, David Stålhane, Stefan Wesslegård, Gustav Åström
- Choir conductor: Cecilia Rydinger
- Choir arrangement: Peter Gabriel with Dom Shaw and Cecilia Rydinger

Orchestra

- Orchestral arrangement: John Metcalfe and Peter Gabriel
- Violins: Everton Nelson, Ian Humphries, Louisa Fuller, Charles Mutter, Cathy Thompson, Natalia Bonner, Richard George, Marianne Haynes, Martin Burgess, Clare Hayes, Debbie Widdup, Odile Ollagnon
- Violas: Bruce White, Fiona Bonds, Peter Lale, Rachel Roberts
- Cellos: Ian Burdge, Chris Worsey, Caroline Dale, William Schofield, Tony Woollard, Chris Allan
- Double bass: Chris Laurence, Stacy Watton, Lucy Shaw
- Orchestra conductor: John Metcalfe
- Orchestra leader: Everton Nelson
- Sheet music supervisor: Dave Foster
- Orchestra contractor: Lucy Whalley and Susie Gillis

== Charts ==
Chart performance for "This Is Home"
Chart (2023)	Peak position
German Downloads (Offizielle Download Top 100)	33
UK Singles Downloads (OCC)	60
