= Megan Rooney =

Canadian multidisciplinary artist

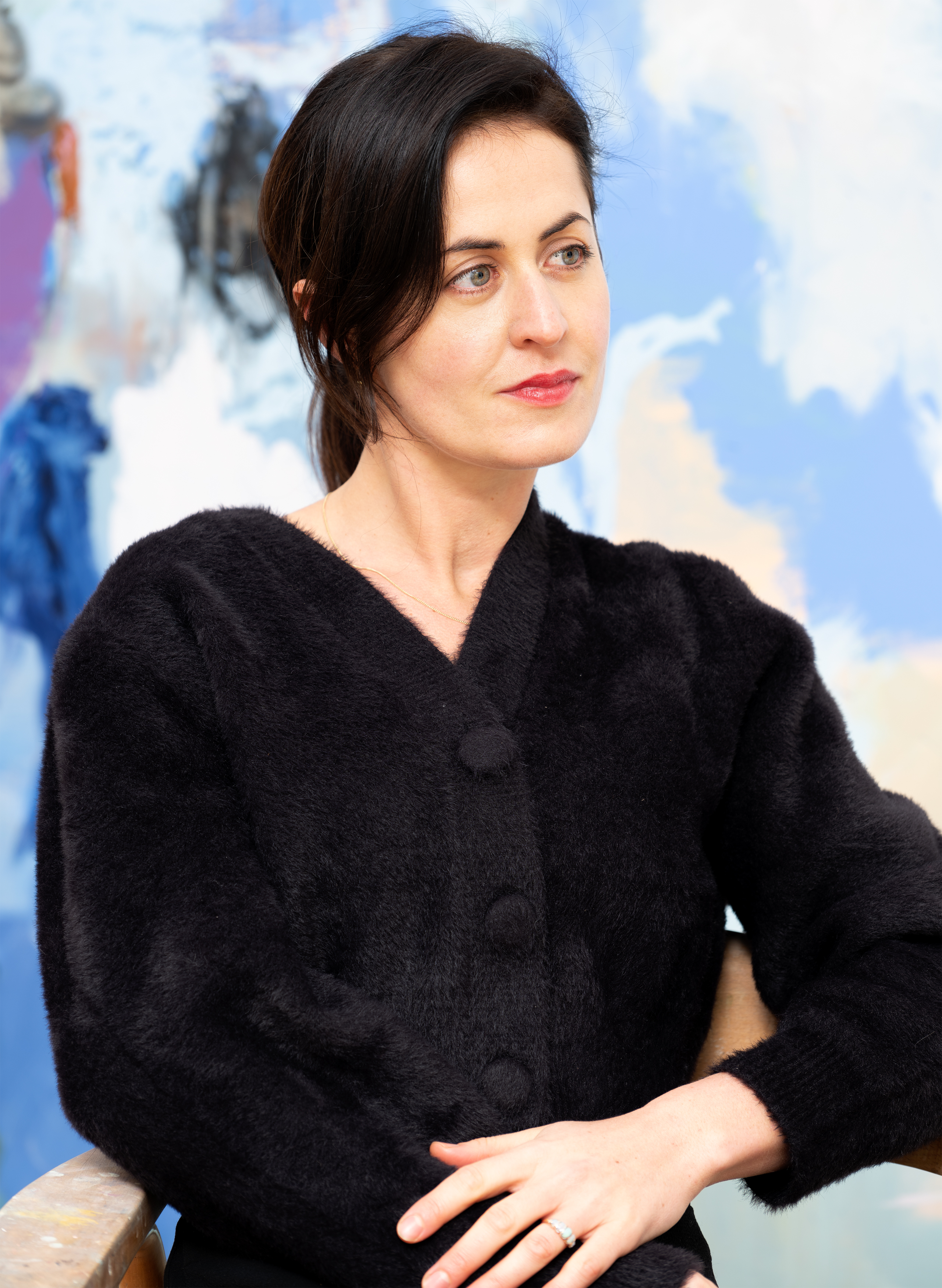
- Born: 1985 (age 40–41)
- Education: Goldsmiths, University of London; University of Toronto
- Website: https://www.megan-rooney.com/

Megan Rooney (born 1985) is a South African-born, London-based artist who creates paintings, sculptures, installations, performances and poetry. Rooney is known for integrating contrasting disciplines, such as painting, sculpture performance, into a single work. She received her MFA from Goldsmiths, University of London in 2011 and, prior to that, completed her BA at the University of Toronto in Canada. Her work has been shown in solo museum exhibitions at the Salzburger Kunstverein, Salzburg (2020–21); Museum of Contemporary Art, Toronto (2020); and Kunsthalle Düsseldorf (2019).

Her performances include SUN DOWN MOON UP, as part of the Park Nights programme at Serpentine Galleries, London in 2018; and EVERYWHERE BEEN THERE, created in collaboration with choreographer Temitope Ajose-Cutting and musician Paolo Thorsen-Nagel, at the Kunsthalle Düsseldorf in 2019 and the Museum of Contemporary Art, Toronto in 2020.

Peter Gabriel chose her painting And Still (Time) to represent his song "And Still", the eleventh single on his eighth album i/o, released in 2023.

== Selected exhibitions ==
In 2019 she exhibited: Where water comes together with other water, in the group exhibition 15th Biennale de Lyon Art Contemporain, Lyon, France.

=== Solo exhibitions ===
- 2024: ECHOES & HOURS, Kettle's Yard, Cambridge, UK
- 2021: BONES ROOTS FRUITS, Thaddaeus Ropac, London, UK
- 2020: HUSH SKY MURMUR HOLE, Museum of Contemporary Art, Toronto, Canada
- 2019: Fire On The Mountain, Kunsthalle Düsseldorf, Germany
- 2017: MOMMA! MOMMA!, Tramway, Glasgow, UK
- 2017: Sun Up Moon Down, Freymond-Guth Fine Arts, Basel, Switzerland*2016: Animals on the bed, Seventeen, London, UK
- 2016: Piggy Piggy, Croy Nielsen, Berlin, Germany
- 2015: Okie Dog on Santa Monica, Almanac Inn, Turin, Italy
