= I/O (album) =

Studio album by Peter Gabriel
- Released: 1 December 2023
- Recorded: April 1995 – December 2022
- Venue: Rexall Place (Edmonton)
- Studios: Real World (Wiltshire); British Grove (London); The Beehive (London); Copper House (London); High Seas (Johannesburg); Alfvénsalen (Uppsala); Fonoprint (Bologna)
- Genres: Art rock; art pop
- Length: 68:09 (bright-side mix); 68:34 (dark-side mix); 68:34 (in-side mix); 205:17 (total)
- Labels: Real World; EMI; Republic
- Producers: Peter Gabriel; Brian Eno; Richard Russell

Peter Gabriel chronology
Flotsam and Jetsam (2019)	I/O (2023)	In the Big Room (2025)

Singles from I/O
- 1. "Panopticom" Released: 6 January 2023; 2. "The Court" Released: 5 February 2023; 3. "Playing for Time" Released: 7 March 2023; 4. "I/O" Released: 6 April 2023; 5. "Four Kinds of Horses" Released: 5 May 2023; 6. "Road to Joy" Released: 4 June 2023; 7. "So Much" Released: 3 July 2023; 8. "Olive Tree" Released: 1 August 2023; 9. "Love Can Heal" Released: 31 August 2023; 10. "This Is Home" Released: 29 September 2023; 11. "And Still" Released: 28 October 2023; 12. "Live and Let Live" Released: 27 November 2023

I/O (stylised as i/o) is the tenth studio album (Note: Eighth album of original material, excluding soundtracks or other commissioned work) by the English singer-songwriter and musician Peter Gabriel, released on 1 December 2023 through Real World Records. It is Gabriel's first album of new original material since Up (2002), marking the longest gap between studio albums in his career. I/O features 12 tracks, each with two different mixes labeled the "Bright-Side Mix" and "Dark-Side Mix". It is also Gabriel's second longest studio album of original material (after O\I), with the mixes clocking in at over 68 minutes each and the total project lasting over two hours. An additional "In-Side Mix" of the album (in surround sound/Dolby Atmos) appears on versions which include the Blu-ray audio disc, which brings the total of the entire project lasting over three hours.

I/O had been in the works for nearly three decades (27 years and eight months), with its initial production dating back to April 1995, at around the same time Gabriel began recording Up. He began planning the follow-up to Up as early as 2000 and had originally intended to release it in 2004, but the album was repeatedly delayed, reworked and re-recorded at seven recording studios (and at Rexall Place during soundchecks while on tour with Sting in 2016) before its completion in December 2022. This was due to Gabriel focusing on other projects such as his two orchestral albums Scratch My Back (2010) and New Blood (2011), which contained covers of songs by other artists and rearrangements of his older material, respectively.

Beginning in January 2023, Gabriel released a new single every full moon, with its alternative mix released on the following new moon, culminating in the album's release at the end of the year; this replicates the 2010 double-sided single releases in promotion of And I'll Scratch Yours (2013). He has stated that he will release more songs in this format following the album's release. I/O received positive reviews from music critics, with praise being particularly directed towards Gabriel's vocals and songwriting. The album was also Gabriel's first to top the UK Albums Chart since So in 1986. I/O won two 2025 Grammy Awards in the categories of Best Engineered Album (Non-Classical) and Best Immersive Audio Album. A follow-up to I/O, titled O\I, was announced in 2025 and will be released at the end of 2026, following I/O's release cycle.

== Background ==
For Up, Gabriel reportedly had over 130 songs in various stages, of which ten were selected for the album. He said that a follow-up album from this material, tentatively titled I/O (also an early name for Up), was intended to be completed by 2004. However, the Growing Up and Still Growing Up tours over the next three years pushed the release further back than anticipated. In 2005, Gabriel reportedly had a pool of 150 songs, which he had been working on with engineer Richard Chappell and percussionist Ged Lynch. Gabriel said he was "trying to write principally about birth and death, with the sex in the middle." In the interview, he discussed the idea of touring before recording and releasing the album. Gabriel soon shifted focus towards 2010's Scratch My Back and 2011's New Blood.

In a 2013 interview with Rolling Stone, Gabriel mentioned that he had twenty songs in the works, saying "It probably hasn't moved nearly as much as I would have liked to in the intervening time. The songs are still there, but some of them I would redo now and there's some new stuff as well." During the Back to Front Tour, Gabriel performed a song entitled "Daddy Long Legs" that would eventually become the third single from I/O, "Playing for Time". Throughout 2014 and 2015, Gabriel posted consistently on social media about working on the new album alongside Chappell and Lynch. Gabriel stated in a 2014 interview that he was working on more upbeat material because "it's very easy for me to fall into some moody stuff." He also revealed that he was working on songs called "Here Comes Love" and "In and Out"; the latter eventually became the album's title track, "I/O". He debuted the song "What Lies Ahead" during a live show in Italy. On the 2016 Rock Paper Scissors tour with Sting, he performed the song "Love Can Heal", and additionally rehearsed new songs "Rock Paper Scissors" and "Radio Everyone".

After a break from music for a few years in order to care for his then-ill wife, Gabriel returned to work on the album in 2019. Gabriel said he was working on about 50 ideas, with the intention of finishing the songs by the end of the year. In 2020, Gabriel mentioned a song about aging called "So Much". In July, he said that he had been "slowed down quite a lot by lockdown" but that he had "enough songs that I like to make a record I'm proud of".

== Recording ==
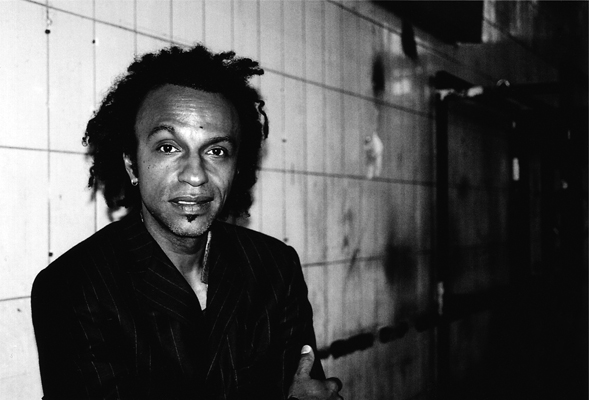
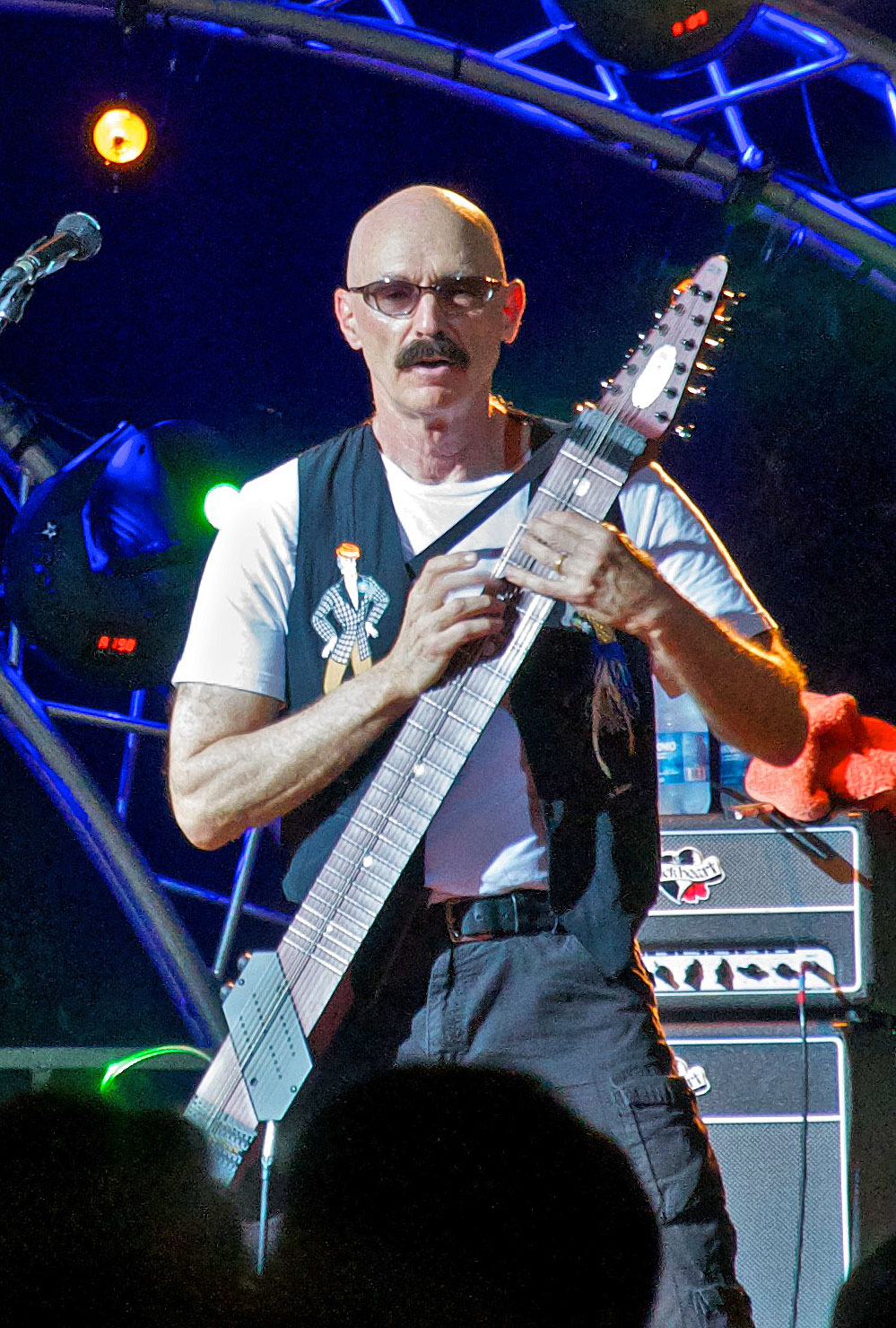
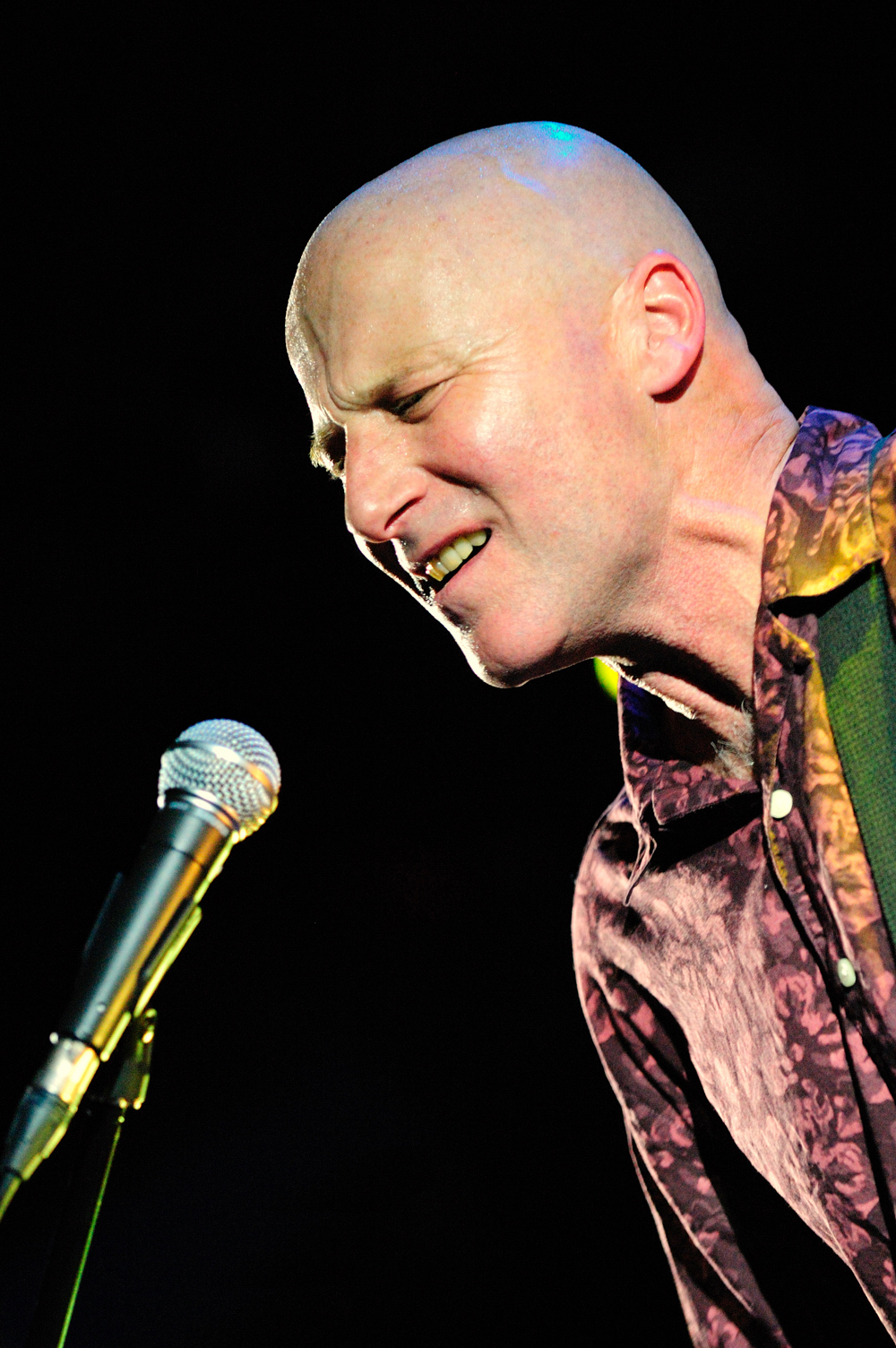
L to R: Longtime Gabriel collaborators Manu Katché, Tony Levin, and David Rhodes served as session musicians on the album.

From September to October 2021, Gabriel recorded the first band material for I/O in Real World Studios, alongside drummer Manu Katché, bassist Tony Levin and guitarist David Rhodes. They reportedly recorded 23 songs. Prior to this, Gabriel had prepared a series of demos, which were "fully formed" according to Rhodes. "As a band, we played along with the pretty-much existing songs. He had the lyrics, which is very rare: he used to not have the lyrics at all, early in the process."

Throughout the following year, Gabriel posted to social media a series of photos from these full band recording sessions, which were engineered by Oli Jacobs and Katie May. Brian Eno also played a large part, contributing production, synthesizers and rhythm programming, electronics and sound design throughout the album. Other notable musicians include Gabriel's daughter Melanie, who has contributed backing vocals since Up, Real World Studios' former head engineer, Oli Jacobs, and engineer Richard Chappell, who has worked at Real World since 1987. In June 2022, Katché said that the album was nearly complete. Gabriel has said that the album, "to his ears," sounds "very different" track by track. Final band sessions for I/O took place in July 2022 to tighten up or re-cut parts for a few songs, according to Levin.

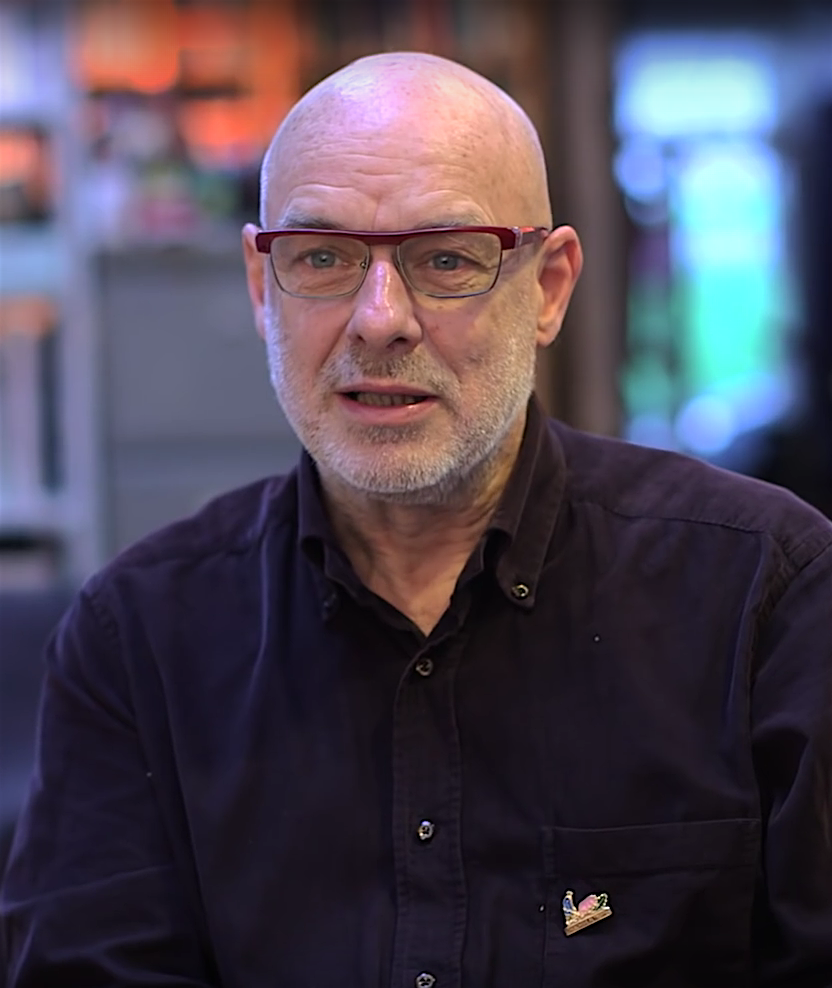
Ambient musician Brian Eno contributed heavily to the album after previously covering the Peter Gabriel song "Mother of Violence" on And I'll Scratch Yours

Both Mark 'Spike' Stent and Tchad Blake contributed a mix of each song from I/O. Gabriel said, "Rather than choosing only one of their mixes to release, I have decided that people should be able to hear all the great work that they are both doing." Stent's mixes are released as the 'Bright-Side Mix', while Blake's mixes are the 'Dark-Side Mix'. All the songs have each also received a third alternative mix in Dolby Atmos, called an 'In-Side Mix', by Hans-Martin Buff. Each 'In-Side Mix' song was released alongside every alternative mix on the new moons.

== Promotion and release ==
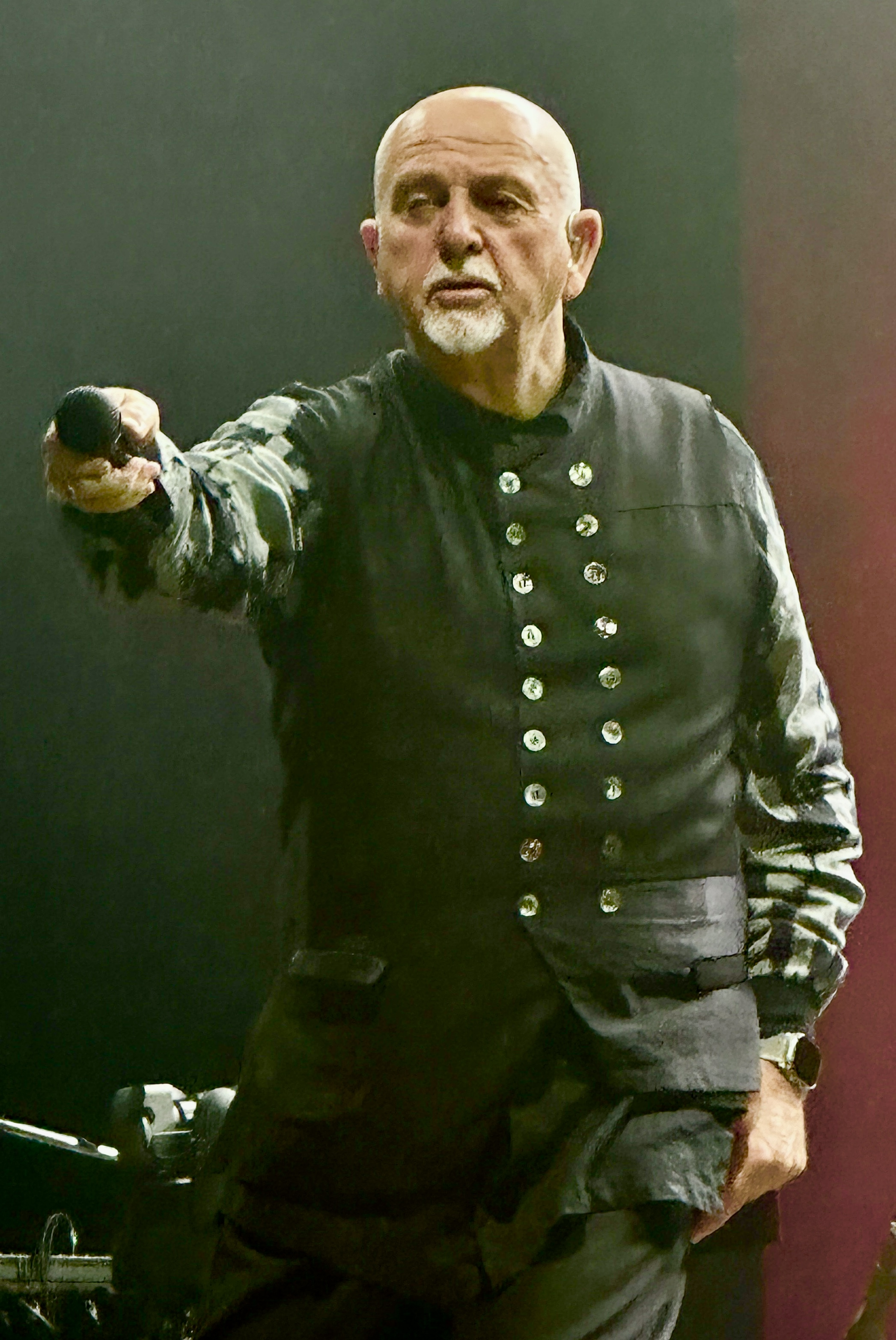
Gabriel in Denver during I/O The Tour, 2023

In November 2022, Gabriel formally announced that after almost 20 years of anticipation, he was ready to release the album I/O, and tour with the new music. Not only does I/O stand for "input/output", but it is also the name of a moon of Jupiter. I/O The Tour covered locations in Europe and North America throughout 2023.

Gabriel announced on 9 January 2023 that he would be releasing singles from the album on each full moon, and the alternative mix (either 'Bright-Side' or 'Dark-Side') along with the In-Side mix every new moon. He has since stated that he might continue in this release format if he has enough stamina to keep up. Gabriel has stated that a little over twenty songs were in consideration for inclusion on the final album.

Every piece is accompanied by a bespoke piece of art (as chosen by Peter Gabriel), similarly to the way Us did in 1992, and Up did in 2002. The artists he has collaborated with are Ai Weiwei, Nick Cave, Barthélémy Toguo, Olafur Eliasson, Annette Messager, Antony Micallef, Henry Hudson, Megan Rooney, Cornelia Parker, Tim Shaw, David Spriggs and David Moreno.

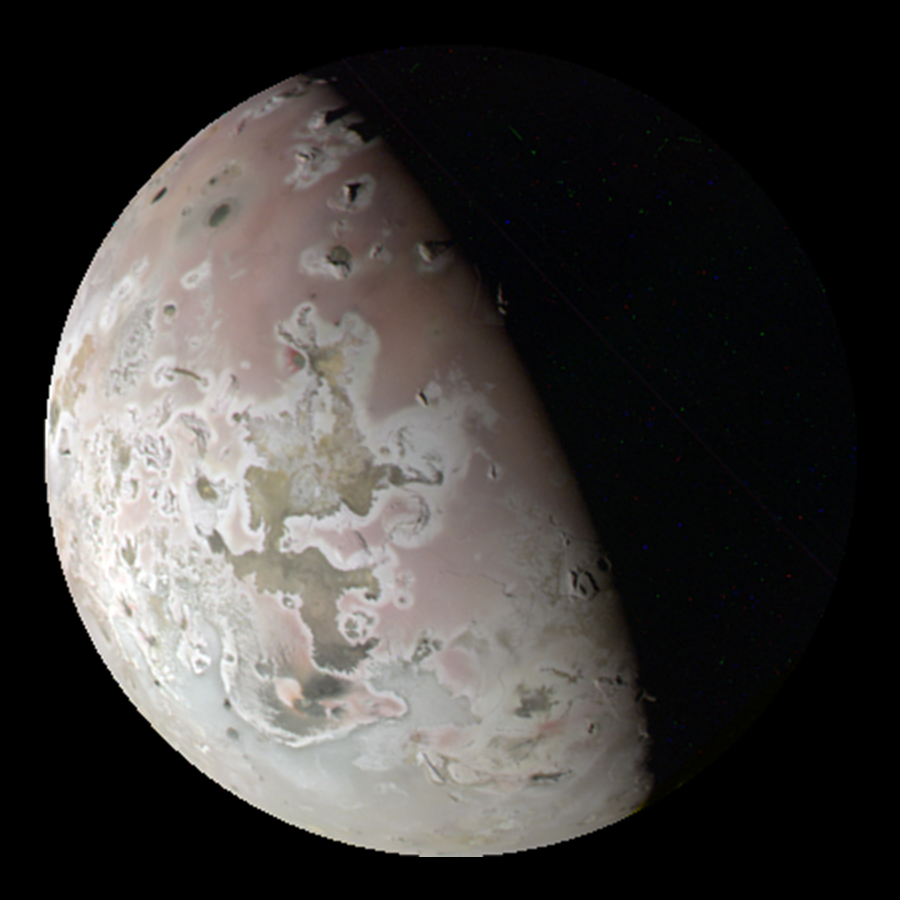
Gabriel took inspiration from astronomy in revealing each of the album's songs in 2023. This also extends to the album title, which stands for "input/output" and references Io, a moon of Jupiter.

The first single to be released from the album was "Panopticom", on the Wolf Moon, 6 January 2023. This was followed by "The Court" on the Snow Moon, "Playing for Time" on the Worm Moon, "I/O" on the Pink Moon, "Four Kinds of Horses" on the Flower Moon, "Road to Joy" on the Strawberry Moon, "So Much" on the Buck Moon, "Olive Tree" on the Sturgeon Moon, and "Love Can Heal" on the Blue Moon. "This Is Home" was released on September 29, the Harvest Moon. "And Still" was released on October 28, the Hunter's Moon, "Live and Let Live" was released on November 27, the Beaver Moon. For this final single, the method of releasing the alternative mixes with a delay was not employed, since the album release date was just four days after the Beaver Moon; instead, Gabriel released all three mixes on the same day.

On I/O The Tour, Gabriel has performed every song from the album, as well as "What Lies Ahead", a song that was considered for the album but was ultimately dropped, although Gabriel said that he intended for the song to appear on his next album.

On 28 July 2023, a listening session of I/O took place at WOMAD, revealing the track listing of the vinyl version. All digital formats stick to the single release pattern.

On 14 October 2023, Gabriel revealed the album's cover art, shot by photographer Nadav Kander, and announced a physical release of the album slated for December 2023. Four days later, it was announced that the album would be released on 1 December. The physical editions of the album include both the Bright-Side and Dark-Side mixes in varying forms: a two-CD edition with one mix on each disc, a two-CD plus Blu-ray edition that adds the In-Side mix, and two separate vinyl editions, each one featuring a different mix across two LPs. A deluxe edition is due for release in March 2024, featuring the contents of the CD, vinyl, and Blu-ray editions, while also including a large format book with extended liner notes and large format art prints and a poster. All physical releases of the album sport an Obi strip showing Peter Gabriel's signature.

== Reception ==
Professional ratings
Aggregate scores
Source	Rating
AnyDecentMusic?	7.9/10
Metacritic	87/100
Review scores
Source	Rating
AllMusic	4.5/5 stars
The Daily Telegraph	5/5 stars
The Guardian	4/5 stars
The Independent	5/5 stars
Mojo	4/5 stars
The Observer	5/5 stars
Pitchfork	7.4/10
Record Collector	4/5 stars
Slant Magazine	3/5 stars
Uncut	8/10

I/O has a score of 87 out of 100 on review aggregator Metacritic based on 16 critics' reviews, indicating "universal acclaim". Alexis Petridis of The Guardian named it his album of the week, writing that it "ebbs and flows beautifully" and describing it as "all clearly carefully considered, but it still sounds remarkably fresh as it touches, lightly, on a variety of Gabriel's longstanding preoccupations". Sam Sodomsky of Pitchfork wrote that "beyond the fact that it actually exists, one of the big surprises of I/O is how uncomplicated it is" as it "reconnects with Gabriel's pop instincts" in that "he is singing big choruses, writing in simple verse about human nature, and trying to uplift". James McNair of Mojo complimented Gabriel's voice, remarking that "none of its sumptuous richness has eroded" and called the album "something substantive, something deeply considered" and "heard in a single sitting, I/O is something else again".

Helen Brown of The Independent commented that "the tracks on I/O grow both on and in a listener like seeds germinating" and concluded that "once you've processed the tracks on the 'Bright-Side mix' you can wait for a night-time drive to experience them on the slightly murkier lower-fi 'Dark-Side mix'. It's great to have Gabriel back." Reviewing the album for Record Collector, Chris Roberts found that the songs "sound like Peter Gabriel songs have sounded since the 90s. Considered, cerebral structures are made accessible and enjoyable by a foundation of art-funk, with his rich, sandy voice providing emotion aplenty". Steve Erickson of Slant Magazine stated that "while the 'Bright Side' mixes bring out the album's more dynamic range, the lyrics lack the edge of Gabriel's early music" and "the more subdued 'Dark Side' mixes only highlight those flaws. I/O is heartfelt and meticulously crafted, but its impact is muted by its splintered presentation."

In a review for the I, Ed Power wrote that in practice, "the light side is slightly jauntier. The dark one has more bass, and Gabriel sounds glummer, as if he's been watching too much I'm a Celebrity", concluding that "if ambitious and well-intentioned, Gabriel's moonage daydream ultimately underwhelms". Neil McCormick of The Daily Telegraph called it "the most beguiling album of 2023" which "ranks with Gabriel's very best work", adding that it was "a sprawling yet gentle epic of the interconnectedness of everything". He wrote that "rather than being overworked to ruin, I/O feels distilled to its philosophical essence" whilst "being gilded with layer after layer of beautiful detail."

=== Pre-release ===
I/O received notoriety for its repeated delays, with Rolling Stone calling it the "Chinese Democracy of Peter Gabriel albums", and Stereogum calling it "the Smile (or perhaps the Chinese Democracy) of art-rock."

== Track listing ==
All tracks are written by Peter Gabriel.

I/O digital and CD version track listing (Bright-Side Mix)
No.	Title	Length
1.	"Panopticom"	5:13
2.	"The Court"	4:20
3.	"Playing for Time"	6:17
4.	"I/O"	3:52
5.	"Four Kinds of Horses"	6:47
6.	"Road to Joy"	5:21
7.	"So Much"	4:50
8.	"Olive Tree"	5:59
9.	"Love Can Heal"	5:59
10.	"This Is Home"	5:04
11.	"And Still"	7:41
12.	"Live and Let Live"	6:46
Total length:		68:09

Notes

- The Dark-Side and In-Side mixes of "Live and Let Live" are 25 seconds longer than the Bright-Side Mix.
- The double LP vinyl records split the listing into four sides, each three tracks long. The positions of many tracks are swapped in relation to the CD:
  - Side A: 1, 3, 2
  - Side B: 5, 4, 9
  - Side C: 6, 7, 8
  - Side D: 10, 11, 12

== Personnel ==
=== Principal musicians ===
- Peter Gabriel – lead vocals, backing vocals, treated vocals (on "And Still") keyboards, synths, piano (on "The Court", "So Much", "Olive Tree", "Love Can Heal", "And Still" and "Live and Let Live"), programming (on "Panopticom", "The Court", "I/O", "Road to Joy", "Olive Tree", "This Is Home", "And Still" and "Live and Let Live"), percussion (on "Four Kinds of Horses", "Love Can Heal", and "Live and Let Live"), manipulated charango (on "Road to Joy"), glass harp (on "And Still")
- David Rhodes – guitars (except on "Playing for Time"), acoustic guitar (on "Olive Tree"), acoustic 12 string guitar (on "So Much" and "Olive Tree"), backing vocals
- Tony Levin – basses
- Manu Katché – drums (except on "Four Kinds of Horses", "So Much", "Love Can Heal" and "And Still")
- Ged Lynch – percussion (on "Olive Tree", "Love Can Heal", and "And Still")
- Tom Cawley – piano (on "Playing for Time")
- Evan Smith – saxophone (on "Olive Tree")
- Josh Shpak – trumpet (on "Road to Joy" and "Olive Tree")
- Melanie Gabriel – backing vocals (on "The Court", "Four Kinds of Horses", "So Much", "Love Can Heal" and "Live and Let Live)
- Ríoghnach Connolly – backing vocals (on "Panopticom", "Love Can Heal" and "This Is Home")
- Jennie Abrahamson – backing vocals (on "Love Can Heal")
- Linnea Olsson – cello (on "Love Can Heal"), backing vocals (on "Love Can Heal")
- Angie Pollock – synths (on "Love Can Heal")
- Brian Eno – synths (on "Panopticom", "The Court", "This Is Home" and "Live and Let Live"), bells (on "Panopticom"), percussion (on "The Court"), rhythm programming and progressing (on "Four Kinds of Horses" and "Road to Joy"), electric worms and additional synths (on "Four Kinds of Horses"), manipulated guitar and ukulele (on "Road to Joy"), rhythm programming (on "Live and Let Live")
- Oli Jacobs – synths (on "Panopticom", "Playing for Time", "I/O" and "This Is Home"), programming (on "Panopticom", "The Court", "I/O", "This Is Home" and "Live and Let Live"), piano (on "Four Kinds of Horses"), tambourine (on "This is Home")
- Don-E – bass synth (on "Road to Joy")
- Katie May – acoustic guitar (on "Panopticom" and "I/O"), percussion (on "The Court", "This Is Home" and "Live and Let Live"), Rickenbacker guitar (on "I/O"), synths (on "I/O"), rhythm programming (on "Four Kinds of Horses"), guitar effects (on "Love Can Heal")
- Richard Evans – D whistle (on "I/O"), mandolin (on "Olive Tree")
- Richard Chappell – programming (on "Panopticom", "The Court", "I/O", "Olive Tree", "And Still" and "Live and Let Live")
- Richard Russell – filtered percussion (on "Four Kinds of Horses")
- Hans-Martin Buff – additional percussion and synths (on "Road to Joy")
- Ron Aslan – additional synths (on "Road to Joy")
- Oli Middleton – percussion (on "This Is Home")
- Paolo Fresu – trumpet (on "Live and Let Live")
- Steve Gadd – brush loop (on "Live and Let Live")

=== Orchestral and choral musicians ===
The New Blood Orchestra: (all tracks except Panopticom, I/O and Love Can Heal):
- Violins: Everton Nelson, Ian Humphries, Louisa Fuller, Charles Mutter, Cathy Thompson, Natalia Bonner, Richard George, Marianne Haynes, Martin Burgess, Clare Hayes, Debbie Widdup, Odile Ollagnon
- Violas: Bruce White, Fiona Bonds, Peter Lale, Rachel Roberts
- Cellos: Ian Burdge (including solo cello on "And Still"), Chris Worsey, Caroline Dale, William Schofield, Tony Woollard, Chris Allan
- Double basses: Chris Laurence, Stacey Watton, Lucy Shaw
- Trumpet: Andrew Crowley
- Tenor trombone/Euphonium: Andy Wood
- Tenor trombone: Tracy Holloway
- Bass trombone: Richard Henry
- Tuba: David Powell
- French horn: David Pyatt, Richard Bissill
- Flute: Eliza Marshall
- Orchestra conductor: John Metcalfe
- Orchestra leader: Everton Nelson
- Orchestral arrangements: John Metcalfe, Peter Gabriel (on "The Court", "So Much", "Olive Tree", "And Still" and "Live and Let Live") and Ed Shearmur (on "Playing for Time")
- The Soweto Gospel Choir: (on "I/O", "Road to Joy" and "Live and Let Live")
  - Soprano: Linda Sambo, Nobuhle Dhlamini, Phello Jiyane, Victoria Sithole
  - Alto: Maserame Ndindwa, Phumla Nkhumeleni, Zanele Ngwenya, Duduzile Ngomane
  - Tenor: George Kaudi, Vusimuzi Shabalala, Xolani Ntombela, Victor Makhathini
  - Bass: Thabang Mkhwanazi, Goodwill Modawu, Warren Mahlangu, Fanizile Nzuza
  - Soloists: Phello Jiyane (Soprano), Duduzile Ngomane (Alto), Vusimuzi Shabalala (Tenor), Fanizile Nzuza (Bass), Victor Makhathini (Male voice Zulu improvisations), Phumla Nkhumeleni (Female ululating and chanting) (on "Live and Let Live")
  - Musical director / vocal arranger: Bongani (Honey) Ncube
- Orphei Drängar: (on "This Is Home")
  - Conductor: Cecilia Rydinger
  - Choir arrangement: Peter Gabriel with Dom Shaw and Cecilia Rydinger

=== Technical personnel ===
- Peter Gabriel – production, design concept
- Richard Russell – additional production on "Four Kinds of Horses"
- Brian Eno – additional production on "Road to Joy"
- Richard Chappell – pre-production engineering
- Oli Jacobs – engineering at Real World
- Katie May – engineering at Real World
- Lewis Jones – engineering at British Grove
- Jacques Du Plessis – engineering at High Seas
- John Foyle – engineering at Copper House
- Erland von Heijne – engineering at Alfvénsalen
- Antonello D'Urso – engineering at Fonoprint
- Faye Dolle – assistant engineering at Real World
- Dom Shaw – assistant engineering at Real World
- Tom Coath – assistant engineering at British Grove
- Luie Stylianou – assistant engineering at British Grove
- Tchad Blake – mixing (Dark-Side)
- Mark "Spike" Stent – mixing (Bright-Side)
- Hans-Martin Buff – Dolby Atmos mixing (In-Side)
- Matt Colton – mastering
- Nadav Kander – photography

== Charts ==
=== Weekly charts ===
Weekly chart performance for I/O
Chart (2023–2024)	Peak position
Australian Albums (ARIA)	20
Austrian Albums (Ö3 Austria)	3
Belgian Albums (Ultratop Flanders)	4
Belgian Albums (Ultratop Wallonia)	2
Canadian Albums (Billboard)	80
Croatian International Albums (HDU)	6
Czech Albums (ČNS IFPI)	89
Danish Albums (Hitlisten)	25
Dutch Albums (Album Top 100)	5
Finnish Albums (Suomen virallinen lista)	29
French Albums (SNEP)	7
German Albums (Offizielle Top 100)	2
Greek Albums (IFPI)	50
Hungarian Physical Albums (MAHASZ)	11
Irish Albums (Official Charts)	28
Italian Albums (FIMI)	4
Japanese Albums (Oricon)	47
Japanese Hot Albums (Billboard Japan)	52
New Zealand Albums (RMNZ)	23
Polish Albums (ZPAV)	7
Portuguese Albums (AFP)	18
Scottish Albums (Official Charts)	2
Spanish Albums (Promusicae)	19
Swedish Albums (Sverigetopplistan)	45
Swiss Albums (Schweizer Hitparade)	2
UK Albums (Official Charts)	1
US Billboard 200	99
US Independent Albums (Billboard)	15
US Top Alternative Albums (Billboard)	7
US Top Rock Albums (Billboard)	13

=== Year-end charts ===
2023 year-end chart performance for I/O
Chart (2023)	Position
Belgian Albums (Ultratop Wallonia)	160

2024 year-end chart performance of I/O
Chart (2024)	Position
German Albums (Offizielle Top 100)	69
