= And Still (Peter Gabriel song) =

Single by Peter Gabriel

from the album I/O
- Released: 28 October 2023 (dark-side mix); 13 November 2023 (bright-side and in-side mixes)
- Studio: Real World (Wiltshire); British Grove (London); The Beehive (London)
- Length: 7:44
- Label: Real World; EMI (UK/Japan); Republic (US/Canada)
- Songwriter: Peter Gabriel
- Producer: Peter Gabriel

Peter Gabriel singles chronology
"This Is Home" (2023)	"And Still" (2023)	"Live and Let Live" (2023)

"And Still" is a song by English musician Peter Gabriel as the eleventh single in promotion of his tenth studio album I/O. Similar to other songs on the album, "And Still" received multiple mixes, starting with Dark-Side mix, which released on 28 October 2023 and produced by Tchad Blake. This was followed by the Bright-Side and In-Side mixes on 13 November 2023. It is the longest track on the album, clocking in at nearly eight minutes. Gabriel performed the song in 2023 on his I/O The Tour.

== Background ==
According to Gabriel, "And Still" was written for his parents. Elaborating on this in a press release, Gabriel stated:

"I wrote a song for my dad a number of years back, which I was actually able to play him, which was 'Father, Son'. When my mum died, I wanted to do something for her, but it's taken a while before I felt comfortable and distant enough to be able to write something. I was trying also to write a little bit in the style of the music that my parents responded to, so I think there is some music from the 40s probably that had an influence on the song. In the middle I wanted to write my mum a beautiful melody. She loved classical music, so we have a beautiful cello playing there. It took a while to get that right, it can't be too emotional or too underplayed, but I think we got there in the end."

Gabriel developed the melody and chord progression for "And Still" on the piano. He then invited a few individuals to his recording studio to work on the song, including Ged Lynch, who provided some percussion. His conga playing was included on a demo of "And Still", which carried the title "No Strings Attached". This demo featured a simpler arrangement with sampled strings and tentative vocal ideas that were later discarded. Brian Eno later visited Gabriel's recording studio and suggested that Gabriel process his vocals with a transformer program. Gabriel commented that the program resulted in his voice sounding "ghost-like" and having an "otherworldly presence". Upon reviewing the track, Gabriel felt that the tempo was too slow, so he opted to re-record the piano track on a Bösendorfer in a room that was formerly a Masonic Temple.

The artwork for the single release was made by artist Megan Rooney, specifically the piece "And Still (Time)". According to Gabriel, they had initially decided on a piece she had already painted, but then told Gabriel she wanted to paint something new. However, after working on the new piece, she felt that it wasn't good enough and decided to go back to using an existing piece.

== Critical reception ==
Writing for The Guardian, Alexis Petridis compared the instrumentation of "And Still" to the early work of Genesis, particularly in regards to the piano, flute and cello. He further stated that the song reflected the lyrical theme of aging that pervades i/o and felt that Gabriel was "haunted by the passing of a previous generation on 'And Still'". Helen Brown of The Independent praised "And Still" as "a spine-tingling journey" that offered a glimpse into Gabriel's upbringing.

== Personnel ==
- Peter Gabriel – lead vocals, backing vocals, treated vocals, piano, synths, programming, glass harp
- David Rhodes – guitars, backing vocals
- Tony Levin – bass
- Ged Lynch – congas
- Richard Chappell – programming

Orchestra

- Orchestral arrangement: John Metcalfe and Peter Gabriel
- Violins: Everton Nelson, Ian Humphries, Louisa Fuller, Charles Mutter, Cathy Thompson, Natalia Bonner, Richard George, Marianne Haynes, Martin Burgess, Clare Hayes, Debbie Widdup, and Odile Ollagnon
- Violas: Bruce White, Fiona Bonds, Peter Lale, and Rachel Roberts
- Cellos: Ian Burdge (including solo cello), Chris Worsey, Caroline Dale, William Schofield, Tony Woollard, and Chris Allan
- Double bass: Chris Laurence, Stacy Watton, and Lucy Shaw
- Flute: Eliza Marshall
- French horn: David Pyatt, Richard Bissill
- Tenor trombone: Andy Wood, Tracy Holloway
- Bass trombone: Richard Henry
- Tuba: David Powell
- Orchestra conductor: John Metcalfe
- Orchestra leader: Everton Nelson
- Sheet music supervisor: Dave Foster
- Orchestra contractor: Lucy Whalley and Susie Gillis

== Charts ==
Chart performance for "And Still"
Chart (2023)	Peak position
German Downloads (Offizielle Download Top 100)	84
