= Road to Joy (Peter Gabriel song) =

Single by Peter Gabriel

from the album I/O
- Released: 4 June 2023 (bright-side mix); 18 June 2023 (dark-side and in-side mixes)
- Studio: Real World (Wiltshire); British Grove (London); The Beehive (London); High Seas (Johannesburg)
- Length: 5:21
- Label: Real World; EMI (UK/Japan); Republic (US/Canada)
- Songwriter: Peter Gabriel
- Producers: Peter Gabriel; Brian Eno

Peter Gabriel singles chronology
"Four Kinds of Horses" (2023)	"Road to Joy" (2023)	"So Much" (2023)

"Road to Joy" is a song by English musician Peter Gabriel, released in June 2023 as the sixth single in promotion of his tenth studio album I/O. The track was produced by Gabriel and English musician Brian Eno, and features Tony Levin on bass, Manu Katché on drums, John Metcalfe on string arrangements, and the Soweto Gospel Choir. Gabriel performed the song in 2023 on his I/O The Tour.

== Background ==
"Road to Joy" was one of the last tracks to emerge for the album, it had originally been conceived around 2000's OVO called "Pukka", albeit sounding different to the final rendition of the track. The original version was centered around a piano loop, a resonant bass part, drums, and synth stabs. The energy of "Road to Joy" prompted Gabriel to revisit the song, so he worked with Brian Eno on some musical ideas at Real World Studios. Gabriel felt that the existing track had a promising groove and was particularly interested in experimenting with Eno on various rhythms. Eno and Gabriel also recorded a ukulele and charango respectively, the latter of which is an instrument from the Andes with ten strings.

Gabriel said that "the excitement and energy in the song was something that I was getting off on. I felt we didn't have enough of that for this record." Lyrically, Gabriel said that the song was about the restoration of senses. Gabriel centered the lyrics around the topic of near-death experiences and how the brain responds to these circumstances, which also related to a brain-related project that he was working on at the time. "It deals with near-death experience and locked-in syndrome situations where people are unable to communicate or to move. It's an amazingly frustrating condition."

In August 2023, "Road to Joy" debuted at number 37 on the Billboard Adult Alternative Airplay chart, making it Gabriel's first entry on the chart since 2008 when he was featured on "Burn You Up, Burn You Down" – that song was credited to Big Blue Ball, a collaborative project that later culminated in the release of the Big Blue Ball album in 2008. As a solo artist, Gabriel had not appeared on the Adult Alternative Airplay chart since "More than This", which peaked at number 20 in 2002. By November, "Road to Joy" had reached its peak of number four on that chart.

== Artwork ==
The single features the artwork "Middle Finger in Pink" by Ai Weiwei. Gabriel had traveled to Cambridge to meet with Weiwei, who was unfamiliar with Gabriel's work. After a follow-up visit in London, Weiwei agreed to collaborate with Gabriel. Weiwei then sent three designs for Gabriel to choose from, all of which centered around "a middle finger raised against authority".

"I'm a big fan of Ai Weiwei, both as an artist, as a designer and as a human rights campaigner. He's an incredibly brave man and regularly risks the wrath of the Chinese government. But his work is exceptional, often political and quite extraordinary."

== Critical reception ==
In his review of I/O, Sam Sodomsky of Pitchfork characterised "Road to Joy" as a "funky" song that "offers insight into a raging existential battle." Helen Brown of The Independent called the song "a bombastic banger" with a beat that resembles Gabriel's "Big Time". Record Collector thought that the song brought "optimism" and a "gleeful vocal" and found that the final line of the song, "then we jump into the lake", echoed the lyrics of Kate Bush.

== Personnel ==
- Peter Gabriel – lead vocals, backing vocals, keyboards, synths, manipulated charango
- David Rhodes – guitars, backing vocals
- Don-E – bass synth
- Tony Levin – basses
- Manu Katché – drums
- Josh Shpak – trumpet
- Brian Eno – rhythm programming and progressing, manipulated guitar and ukulele
- Hans-Martin Buff – additional percussion and synths
- Ron Aslan – additional synths

Orchestra

- Orchestral arrangement: John Metcalfe
- Violins: Everton Nelson, Ian Humphries, Louisa Fuller, Charles Mutter, Cathy Thompson, Natalia Bonner, Richard George, Marianne Haynes, Martin Burgess, Clare Hayes, Debbie Widdup, Odile Ollagnon
- Violas: Bruce White, Fiona Bonds, Peter Lale, Rachel Roberts
- Cellos: Ian Burdge, Chris Worsey, Caroline Dale, William Schofield, Tony Woollard, Chris Allan
- Double bass: Chris Laurence, Stacy Watton, Lucy Shaw
- Orchestra conductor: John Metcalfe
- Orchestra leader: Everton Nelson
- Sheet music supervisor: Dave Foster
- Orchestra contractor: Lucy Whalley and Susie Gillis

Choir

Soweto Gospel Choir

- Soprano: Linda Sambo, Nobuhle Dhlamini, Phello Jiyane, Victoria Sithole
- Alto Maserame Ndindwa, Phumla Nkhumeleni, Zanele Ngwenya, Duduzile Ngomane
- Tenor: George Kaudi, Vusimuzi Shabalala, Xolani Ntombela, Victor Makhathini
- Bass: Thabang Mkhwanazi, Goodwill Modawu, Warren Mahlangu, Fanizile Nzuza
- Musical director / vocal arranger: Bongani "Honey" Ncube

== Charts ==
Chart performance for "Road to Joy"
Chart (2023)	Peak position
UK Singles Downloads (OCC)	55
US Adult Alternative Airplay (Billboard)	4
US Rock & Alternative Airplay (Billboard)	45
