= So Much (Peter Gabriel song) =

Single by Peter Gabriel

from the album I/O
- Released: 3 July 2023 (dark-side mix); 17 July 2023 (bright-side and in-side mixes); 19 July 2023 (guitar version)
- Studio: Real World (Wiltshire); The Beehive (London); British Grove (London)
- Length: 4:50
- Label: Real World; EMI (UK/Japan); Republic (US/Canada)
- Songwriter: Peter Gabriel
- Producer: Peter Gabriel

Peter Gabriel singles chronology
"Road to Joy" (2023)	"So Much" (2023)	"Olive Tree" (2023)

"So Much" is a song by English musician Peter Gabriel, released in July 2023 as the seventh single in promotion of his tenth studio album I/O. Similar to other singles from the album, "So Much" was released to coincide with a full moon, starting with the Dark-Side Mix produced by Tchad Blake. Later in the month, two additional mixes created by Mark 'Spike' Stent and Hans-Martin Buff were released.

== Background ==
Gabriel started writing "So Much" between 2015 and 2016 with the intention of writing something with a simple chorus that "still had a bit of character to it". He first revealed the song's title in 2020 when he responded to an article by Phillip Collins in The Times. In his response, Gabriel described "So Much" as a "getting old song". Gabriel said that the song was about mortality and aging. He selected the title of "So Much" due to his "addiction to new ideas and all sorts of projects."

I get excited by things and want to jump around and do different things. I love being in a mess of so much! And yet it also means there's just so much time, or whatever it is, available. Balancing them both is what the song is about.

Gabriel claimed in his Full Moon Update that the song was a bit polarizing, that "it will split an audience" "about 50/50" with those who love it and those who don't care for it. According to Gabriel, Tchad Blake called it "the best thing that he has ever done."

In addition to Blake's Dark-Side mix, a Bright-Side mix and In-Side mix, created by Mark 'Spike' Stent and Hans-Martin Buff respectively, were released on 17 July 2023. The Bright-Side mix included more prominent cello, bass, and guitar during the intro. Another mix of the song, dubbed the "Guitar Version), was oriented around electric guitar arpeggios played by David Rhodes and also featured extra reverb and keyboards. Gabriel explained that he attempted to take the song in a different direction due to his belief that i/o "had enough piano". He later decided that the piano version felt more personal, so he reverted back to that arrangement.

== Artwork ==
Henry Hudson created the cover artwork, titled Somewhere Over Mercia. The artwork features a yellow horizontal line imposed over an indigo sky. Gabriel gravitated towards Hudson's work with expressionist artwork surrounding horizons and said that Hudson wanted to undercut the horizon with a yellow streak so that it would seep into the rest of the painting. He believed that the cover artwork possessed "good symbolism" with how it conveyed an "infinite horizon" with a boundary.

== Personnel ==
- Peter Gabriel – vocals, backing vocals, piano, synths
- Tony Levin – bass
- David Rhodes – guitars
- Melanie Gabriel – backing vocals
- John Metcalfe – orchestral conductor
- Oli Jacobs – engineering
- Katie May – engineering

Orchestra

- Orchestral arrangement: John Metcalfe and Peter Gabriel
- Violin: Everton Nelson, Ian Humphries, Louisa Fuller, Charles Mutter, Cathy Thompson, Natalia Bonner, Richard George, Marianne Haynes, Martin Burgess, Clare Hayes, Debbie Widdup, and Odile Ollagnon
- Viola: Bruce White, Fiona Bonds, Peter Lale, and Rachel Roberts
- Cello: Ian Burdge, Chris Worsey, Caroline Dale, William Schofield, Tony Woollard, and Chris Allan
- Double bass: Chris Laurence, Stacy Watton, and Lucy Shaw
- French horn: David Pyatt and Richard Bissill
- Trumpet: Andrew Crowley
- Euphonium: Andy Wood
- Tenor trombone: Tracey Holloway
- Bass trombone: Richard Henry
- Tuba: David Powell
- Orchestra conductor: John Metcalfe
- Orchestra leader: Everton Nelson
- Sheet music supervisor: Dave Foster
- Orchestra contractor: Lucy Whalley and Susie Gillis

== Charts ==
Chart performance for "So Much"
Chart (2023)	Peak position
German Downloads (Offizielle Download Top 100)	85
UK Singles Downloads (Official Charts)	69
