= Love Can Heal =

Single by Peter Gabriel

from the album I/O
- Released: 31 August 2023 (bright-side mix); 15 September (dark-side and in-side mixes)
- Studio: Real World (Wiltshire); The Beehive (London)
- Venue: Rexall Place (Edmonton)
- Length: 5:59
- Label: Real World; EMI (UK/Japan); Republic (US/Canada)
- Songwriter: Peter Gabriel
- Producer: Peter Gabriel

Peter Gabriel singles chronology
"Olive Tree" (2023)	"Love Can Heal" (2023)	"This Is Home" (2023)

"Love Can Heal" is a song by English musician Peter Gabriel, released as the ninth single in promotion of his tenth studio album I/O. Due to August having a blue moon, this was the second of two tracks to be released in August alongside "Olive Tree". Three versions of "Love Can Heal" were created, starting with the Bright-Side mix, which was produced by Spike Stent. On 15 September 2023, the Dark-Side mix (produced by Tchad Blake) and the In-Side mix (produced by Hans-Martin Buff) were also released. Gabriel described Buff's mix as an "immersive" experience that provided the listener "a place just to drift off into."

== Background ==
"Love Can Heal" was debuted live in 2016 during the Rock, Paper, Scissors tour in North America. Gabriel wrote the song as a tribute to British politician Jo Cox, who was murdered that year. Prior to her assassination, Gabriel had encountered Cox at a leadership conference. In a press release, Gabriel explained that he included the track on i/o because he believed it fit with the theme of "being connected to everything".

According to Gabriel, the track is a "dreamy, experiential piece with some abstract imagery" and "a carpet of sound, a tapestry where things are woven together, but not necessarily supposed to stick out, but just form part of a whole". Gabriel aimed to create a "sensual, gentle environment to suggest a loving place out of these textured sounds" and developed a series of chords around a repetitive motif. Around two months after the demo was first created, Gabriel overdubbed some wine glasses, which he had affinity for ever since he experimented with the Fairlight CMI in the 1980s.

Aspects of the song, including the backing vocals from Jennie Abrahamson and Linnea Olsson, were taken from a live performance in Edmonton on 24 July 2016. Olsson's cello was also taken from the same performance, which first appears during the intro and mimics the melody found on the chorus. The song largely adheres to a chord progression of E-flat major, G minor, F major, although the song modulates to C major during the bridge and features an occasional E flat major seventh.

== Artwork and music video ==
The cover was designed by artist Antony Micallef with his work "a small painting of what I think love looks". Micallef also worked with Aardman Animations to create the song's music video. About the track and artwork, Micallef said:

"With 'Love Can Heal' I could see my images coming up when I was hearing it. [...] I love artists who take risks and Peter's always chopped and changed and I like to do that too with my work and you know it doesn't just rest on this one thing."

== Personnel ==
- Peter Gabriel – lead vocals, backing vocals, synths, piano, hairy drum
- David Rhodes – guitars, backing vocals
- Tony Levin – bass
- Ged Lynch – percussion
- Melanie Gabriel – backing vocals
- Ríoghnach Connolly – backing vocals
- Jennie Abrahamson – backing vocals
- Linnea Olsson – solo cello, backing vocals
- Angie Pollock – synths
- Katie May – guitar effects

== Charts ==
Chart performance for "Love Can Heal"
Chart (2023)	Peak position
German Downloads (Offizielle Download Top 100)	75
