= Antony Micallef =

British contemporary artist and painter

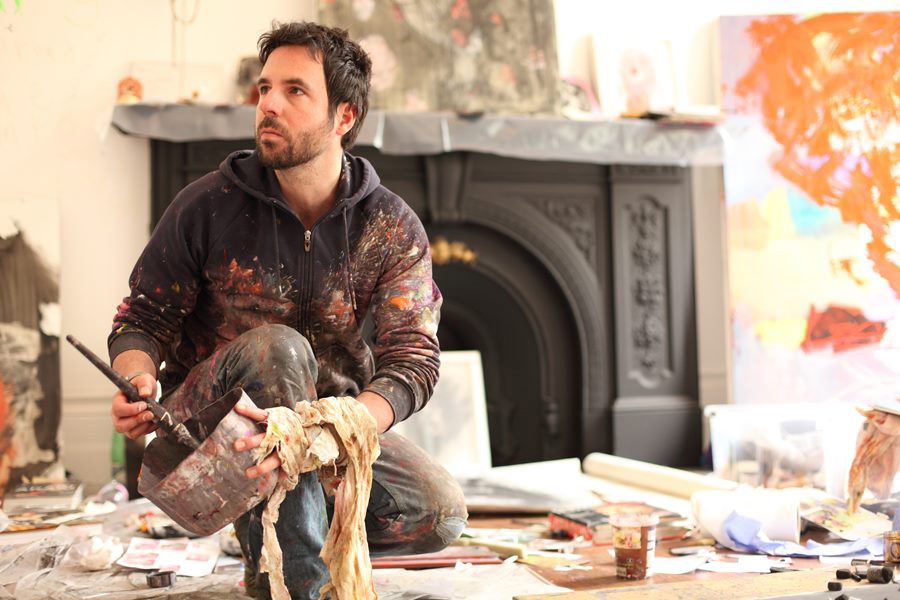
- Born: 1975 (age 50–51); Swindon, England
- Known for: Artist

Antony Micallef is a British contemporary artist and painter working in London.

He appeared on the British art scene after being a prize winner of the BP Portrait Award competition. Since then, his mix of political imagery fused with contemporary expressionism has won him worldwide acclaim.

Recent exhibitions include group shows at the Royal Academy and the Tate Britain.

His paintings examine the contemporary relationship with consumerism and branding among other themes. His work concerns itself with what he sees as the "frivolities" of pop culture in a process that has been dubbed "critical pop".

== Art ==
A graduate in Fine Arts from the University of Plymouth, Micallef's practice has been summarized as 'critical pop', exposing the darker side of our consumerist society and the human condition.

His use of neutral colors and depictions of the human form delve beyond pop culture and bring to the surface many of the things that operate underneath the cultural construct.

Aspects of Micallef's work examines our dichotomous relationship with consumerism, questioning how we can despise multi-national brands yet still allow ourselves to be seduced by them. He frequently uses the union of two opposites to make an intriguing chemistry.

His painting style has been compared to Francis Bacon and is seen as an amalgamation of influences from the old masters such as Caravaggio and Velázquez to more modern contemporary photographers and graphic artists.

His depiction of the human body and mark making echo his teachings from John Virtue, a former student of Frank Auerbach. The rawness of expressionistic painterly marks work in stark contrast to the more graphic elements which surface throughout his work. In Raw Intent, a 2016 series of self-portraits, Micallef moved his focus away from social critique and more toward depicting emotion, saying, "This body of work I’m making now is really about being human."

From 18 June 2007 Sotheby's catalogue:

Having won second prize in the BP/Amoco Portrait of the Year awards in 2000, Anthony Micallef moved away from strict portraiture preferring to combine his exquisite draughtsmanship with a dark and passionate exploration of colour and contemporary expressionism as a means of dissecting what he sees as the frivolities of pop culture. He says, "The trouble with pop imagery is that it doesn’t really go deeper than the surface, you have to drag it down and challenge it to make it interesting. When you put two contrasting images together it causes friction and that is the bit I’m interested in." In the present work, the dark, Bacon-esque smears to the face conjure unlooked for associations when combined with the delicately alluring roses, the juxtaposition revealing at once the saccharine seduction of colourful pop imagery and consumerism alongside its dark and troubling underbelly. This complexity and brutal beauty explain why Anthony Micallef has become one of the most promising young artists working in Britain today.

In 2012, to accompany the AKA Peace Exhibition at the Institute of Contemporary Arts (ICA), Art Below showcased selected works from the AKA Peace series on the London Underground including Micallef's. "AKA Peace," originally conceived by photographer Bran Symondson and now curated by artist Jake Chapman, was an exhibition of new works made for The Peace One Day Project 2012, bringing together a group of Contemporary Artists, all of whom agreed to transform a decommissioned AK-47 assault rifle, refashioning it into works of art.

=== Penguin Books cover ===
In 2017, Micallef had his work selected for the cover of Penguin Books' edition of The Outsider by Albert Camus.

Peter Gabriel

In 2023, one of Micallef's paintings, "a small painting of what I think love looks like", was selected by Peter Gabriel to be the cover art for the song "Love Can Heal", the ninth single off his album i/o. On tour, during the performance of the song, strong visual imagery of this painting was used on screens.

=== Social media ===
Micallef embraces social media and its ability to showcase his artwork to the masses, but he is also highly critical of the highly curated version of life portrayed on most social platforms.

== Controversy ==
London Underground had commissioned Micallef for a piece of artwork to depict one of the stations of the cross however in the last minute became subject to censorship for the use of the tagline 'kill your idol' found in the artwork.

"To my dismay I found out at the last minute the London Underground have decided to pull the piece from the show apparently because of the title ‘Kill your idol’ in the middle of the panel in the painting."

Micallef's most recent controversial piece is the political satire of Donald Trump using cigarette packets as his canvas, rendering the at that time Republican nominee on the front of a cigarette packet bearing the now familiar "Smoking kills" tagline.

Micallef intends to highlight the threat that Trump poses to society. As he explains, "I thought a warning sign of the imminent danger of a narcissistic sociopath fitted aptly into the concept." having been displayed as part of the group show the controversial 'Why I Want To Fuck Donald Trump' exhibition at New York's Joshua Liner Gallery in 2016.

Micallef's Trump pieces were used for both the protest marches In L.A and In Washington D.C for the Women's March after the inauguration of the 45th President.

The image had also been used for a Placebo concert in Mexico in 2017, again in protest at the new president. Also, a fake news story image of the 43rd President George Bush painting the image had gone viral and used in the publication of The Big Issue.

== Critical reception ==
Paul Moorhouse the head of collection displays (Victorian to contemporary) and senior curator 20th-century collections at the national portrait gallery essay 'The Brutality of Appearance: Antony Micallef’s Self-Portraits', explores the physicality, the fleshliness and violence of Micallef's work,

"While maintaining an illusionistic intimation of space and background, his portraits present a figure as if it has been subjected to an intense trauma" all the while contextulising him within the canon of art history and the painted portrait.

In 2011 a piece by Andrew Perry for Telegraph said "Antony Micallef’s riotous paintings are a gleeful attack on consumerism." Also calling Antony "one of Britain’s most electrifying young painters".

In a piece by editor Dylan Jones of GQ magazine in 2015 Antony is hailed to "change the face of modern portraiture". the piece describes Antony and his work as raw and painterly giving particular praise to the honesty of his portraits and the connection between him and the painter Frank Auerbach stating,

"Surely if there is a man to whom Auerbach should pass his torch then it is Micallef".

== Artist statement ==
Art can have many functions but essentially it’s a language where if used in the right way can get us to view or hear things and sense them with pure emotion instead of thoughts.

When I begin painting a face it feels like I'm facing for marks randomly, trying to catch an expression of a character, an identity.

My work is like watching a Disney movie which slowly turns into violent pornography.

== Solo exhibitions ==
- 2016, Pearl Lam, Raw Intent, Pedder Building Space, Hong Kong, China
- 2015, Lazarides, Self, Rathbourne, London, UK
- 2012, Lazarides, A Little Piece of Me, The Outsiders London, UK
- 2011, Lazarides, Happy Deep Inside My Heart, Rathbourne, London, UK
- 2009, Lazarides, Becoming Animal, Rathbourne, London, UK
- 2007, Lazarides, Impure Idols, Los Angeles, USA
- 2006, Lazarides, It's A Wonderful World, London, UK
- 2006, Eyestorm, Antony Micallef, Milian, Italy
- 2005, National Academy of Fine Arts, Sofia, Bulgaria

== Selected group exhibitions ==
- 2017, Art Busan, Korea
- 2017, Nottingham Castle Museum, Reportrait, Nottingham, UK
- 2017, Pearl Lam, Art Brussels, Belgium
- 2017, Pearl Lam, Art Basel, Hong Kong, China
- 2017, Pearl Lam, Art stage, Singapore, Malaysia
- 2016, Pearl Lam, Shanghai Contemporary Art Fair, Shanghai, China
- 2016, Joshua Liner Gallery, Why I Want to Fuck Donald Trump, New York, USA
- 2016, Pearl Lam, Art stage, Jakarta, Indonesia
- 2016, Royal College of Art, Secret Postcard Exhibition, (charity supporting younger artists) UK
- 2016, Pearl Lam, Art Basel, Hong Kong, China
- 2016, Pearl Lam, Art stage Singapore, Malaysia
- 2015, Pearl Lam, Art Seoul, South Korea
- 2015, Pearl Lam, Expo Chicago, USA
- 2015, Pearl Lam, Sydney Contemporary, Australia
- 2015, Pearl Lam, West Bund Art Centre, Shanghai, China
- 2015, Pearl Lam, Harpers Bazaar Indonesia Art Fair, Jakarta, Indonesia
- 2014, Royal Academy, Royal Academy Summer Show, London, UK
- 2014, Kill your Idol, St Marylebone Parish Church, London, UK
- 2014, Dallas Contemporary, MTV RE:DEFINE, Goss Micheal Foundation, Dallas, USA
- 2014, Lazarides, Art14 London, London, UK
- 2013, Copelouzos Familay Art Museum, Athens, Greece
- 2013, National Museum of Warsaw, Nowa Sztuka, Poland
- 2013, Saatchi Gallery, Artwars, London, UK
- 2012, Lazarides, Pop-up, The Old Vic Tunnels, Bedlam, London, UK
- 2012, The Institute of Contemporary Arts, Peace One Day, London, UK
- 2011, Bertrand & Gruner, Cabinet de Curiosities, Geneva, Switzerland
- 2011, Lazarides Pop-up, Old Vic Tunnels, Minotaur, London, UK
- 2010, Lazarides, Hells Half Acre Show, Old Vic Tunnels, London, UK
- 2010, Lazarides, Eurotrash, Los Angeles, USA
- 2009, Tunnel 228, London, UK
  Antony Micallef participates in Tunnel 228, a show featuring over 20 artists and the theatre company Punchdrunk. A Metropolis-inspired exhibition with a mixture of art and live performance by actors. Located in the tunnels off Leake Street underneath Waterloo station and directed by Kevin Spacey.
- 2009, UN and Roddick Foundation, Journey, Washington Place, New York, USA
- 2009, Lazarides, Grow Up, London, UK
- 2008 -2009, Tate Britain, London, UK
  Antony Micallef along with Paula Rego and Mark Hearld were invited to take part in the 50th anniversary celebration of the famous Curwen Studios. To commemorate the occasion they exhibited a special limited edition lithograph print in the Tate Britain (Goodison Room).
- 2008, The Royal Academy GSK Contemporary, London, UK
  Antony Micallef was invited by the RA to take part in a group show showcasing new contemporary artists. Displaying 4 bronze nickel-plated 13 ft sculptures in the forecourt (Burlington Gardens). Parasite. Also displaying three meter square paintings inside the academy.
- 2008, Lazarides Pop-up, The Outsiders New York, New York, USA
- 2008, The Outsiders, Outsiders, London, UK
- 2007, Santa's Ghetto Bethlehem, Manger Square, Palestine
  Micallef participated in Santa's Ghetto in Bethlehem, a group show with over 30 international artists that raised almost $1 million to provide funding for local students attending Dar a-Kalima College, the only dedicated arts university in the Middle East. From this exhibition Micallef produced a body of work documenting his time spent behind the wall.
- 2006, Arcuate Arte Contemporaneo, Another Fucking Collective, Mexico
- 2006, National Portrait Gallery, Mystery Portrait Exhibition, London, UK
- 2005, ManHan Gallery, 44 Boards: Human Rights Coalition, Ohio, USA
- 2005, Alphabet Gallery, How I learned to Stop Working and Love the Bomb, London, UK
- 2005, Millenaris Park, Budapest, Hungary
  Micallef represented the UK in an international exhibition looking at urban counterculture. Micallef was invited by the directors of Millenaris Park, a government-funded arts organization to paint on a Trabant car, the icon of the communist era.
- 2006, 'Eyestorm', Milan, Italy
  Antony Micallef presents a sell-out solo exhibition in the heart of Milan, Italy. The exhibition showcases a series of specially commissioned limited edition lithograph prints. As well as being exhibited in Milan the prints were also on show at the British Embassy in Florence alongside Damien Hirst, Peter Blake, and Richard Davidson.
- 2004, A.D Gallery, California, USA
- 2000, The National Portrait Gallery, London, UK
  Antony Micallef wins second prize in the BP Portrait Award competition the first time he enters. This is seen as the catalyst for his future career.

== Scholarly articles ==
- Paul Moorehouse, The Brutality of Appearance: Antony Micallef’s Self-Portraits'.
