= I/O (song) =

Single by Peter Gabriel

from the album I/O
- Released: 6 April 2023 (bright-side mix); 20 April 2023 (dark-side and in-side mixes)
- Studio: Real World (Wiltshire); The Beehive (London); High Seas (Johannesburg)
- Genre: Art rock
- Length: 3:52
- Label: Real World; EMI (UK/Japan); Republic (United States/Canada)
- Songwriter: Peter Gabriel
- Producer: Peter Gabriel

Peter Gabriel singles chronology
"Playing for Time" (2023)	"I/O" (2023)	"Four Kinds of Horses" (2023)

"I/O" (typeset as "i/o") is the fourth single and title track of English musician Peter Gabriel's tenth studio album I/O, his first album of original material since 2002's Up, and his first featuring a title track. Three versions of the song have been released: the "Bright-Side Mix" (mixed by Mark "Spike" Stent), the "Dark-Side Mix" (mixed by Tchad Blake), and the "In-Side Mix" (mixed by Hans-Martin Buff). The Bright-Side mix of "I/O" was released on the Pink Moon, the full moon in April, which occurred on the 6th. The Dark-Side and In-Side mixes followed on the 20th of April.

== Background ==
Recorded at Gabriel's Real World Studios in Wiltshire and the Beehive in London, "i/o" features regulars Tony Levin on bass, David Rhodes on electric guitar, and Manu Katché on drums. Additionally, the track is the first of three on the album to feature the Soweto Gospel Choir from South Africa, whose parts were recorded at High Seas Studios. The Soweto Gospel Choir had previously collaborated with Gabriel in 2008 on "Down to Earth" for the WALL-E soundtrack.

Gabriel explained that I/O stands for input/output, which served as a starting point for writing a song about the world's interconnectedness, adding that "if we can see ourselves as better connected, still messed up individuals, but as part of a whole, then maybe there's something to learn." The main piano riff and the ending were amongst the first things developed for the song, which went through a few different iterations that included various unused sections, including a jazzy interlude and an electronic outro.

== Artwork ==
The cover art for this track features artwork from Olafur Eliasson, who met Gabriel around the launch of Eliasson's Little Sun project. Gabriel felt that Eliasson's work would be "perfect" for "i/o", and the two ultimately agreed upon Colour experiment no. 114, which Eliasson created in 2022. In his April full moon message, Gabriel said that he gravitated toward Eliasson's work with light and nature and would have been "greatly disappointed" if Eliasson declined to participate.

== Critical reception ==
Writing for Mojo James McNair highlighted the song's "pantheistic worldview" and themes surrounding consecutiveness and mutual dependency. In his review of the album, Alexis Petridis of The Guardian noted the title tracks's "epic, stadium-ready grandeur." Sam Sodomsky of Pitchfork was critical of the lyrics in the chorus and wondered why Gabriel was unable to generate better lyrics than "stuff coming out/stuff going in".

== Personnel ==
- Peter Gabriel – lead vocals and backing vocals, piano, synthesizers, rhythm programming, production
- Tony Levin – bass guitar
- David Rhodes – electric guitar
- Manu Katché – drums
- Katie May – percussions, Rickenbacker guitar, acoustic guitar and additional synths
- Oli Jacobs – rhythm programming and additional synths
- Richard Evans – D whistle

Choir

Soweto Gospel Choir

- Soprano: Linda Sambo, Nobuhle Dhlamini, Phello Jiyane, Victoria Sithole
- Alto: Maserame Ndindwa, Phumla Nkhumeleni, Zanele Ngwenya, Duduzile Ngomane
- Tenor: George Kaudi, Vusimuzi Shabalala, Xolani Ntombela, Victor Makhathini
- Bass: Thabang Mkhwanazi, Goodwill Modawu, Warren Mahlangu, Fanizile Nzuza
- Musical director / vocal arranger: Bongani (Honey) Ncube

== Charts ==
Chart performance for "I/O"
Chart (2023)	Peak position
UK Singles Downloads (Official Charts)	70
