= John Metcalfe (composer) =

New Zealand composer and violinist

John Metcalfe (born 6 August 1964) is a British-based composer, arranger and violist, member of the Duke Quartet and a former member of the band The Durutti Column.

== Biography ==
Metcalfe was born in New Zealand and moved to the United Kingdom as a child. Metcalfe studied viola at the Royal Northern College of Music and later at the Hochschule in Berlin. During this period he joined Vini Reilly in The Durutti Column.

Metcalfe's unique style is a result of his extensive experience in classical, pop and electronica. As violist with the Duke Quartet he released many CDs and toured worldwide. Metcalfe's string arrangements played by the Dukes feature on many albums by pop artists including Morrissey, Simple Minds, The Pretenders, Coldplay and Blur.

Metcalfe was instrumental in the formation of the record label Factory Classical, an offshoot of Tony Wilson's Factory Records. He released an album of his own, The Inner Line, to positive reviews. In 2004, another album, Scorching Bay, was released, followed by A Darker Sunset in 2008. The Appearance of Colour was released in April 2013 as part of Bowers and Wilkins Society of Sound subscription series.

Commissions include a set of pieces for the guitarist Tom Kerstens and an album of electronic/acoustic music for 'cellist Matthew Barley. His music has also been used by various contemporary dance companies.

He also collaborated with Peter Gabriel, writing arrangements for his "song-swap" album, Scratch My Back, and for the tour following it. For New Blood (2011), which he co-produced with Gabriel, he arranged and orchestrated versions of Gabriel's songs. He and Gabriel continued collaborating on Gabriel's album i/o, released on 1 December 2023.

In 2015, Metcalfe released a solo album titled Kites and Echos on Bowers & Wilkins Society of Sound and The Appearance of Colour on Real World Records.

== Discography ==
=== Solo albums ===
- The Inner Line (2004)
- Scorching Bay (2004)
- A Darker Sunset (2008)
- The Appearance of Colour (2013)
- Kites and Echoes / The Appearance of Colour (2015)
- Absence (2018)
- Tree (2023)
