= Back to Front: Live in London =

Live album and film by Peter Gabriel
- Released: 23 June 2014
- Recorded: 21 and 22 October 2013
- Venue: The O2 Arena (London)
- Genre: Rock
- Length: 125:20
- Labels: Real World; Eagle Rock

Peter Gabriel chronology
And I'll Scratch Yours (2013)	Back to Front: Live in London (2014)	Growing Up Live (2019)

Professional ratings
Review scores
Source	Rating
The Guardian	2/5 stars

Back to Front: Live in London is a live album and film by the English rock musician Peter Gabriel, recorded at The O2 Arena in London on 21 and 22 October 2013 during his Back to Front Tour. The release includes the regular recording of the concerts as well as a special "theatrical" version with interviews, directed by Hamish Hamilton.

Back to Front: Live in London was released in the following formats:

- DVD
- Blu-ray
- DVD Deluxe Book Edition (2 DVD + 2 CD)
- Blu-ray Deluxe Book Edition (2 Blu-ray + 2 CD)

It was later released on 4K Ultra HD Blu-ray in 2024.

== Track listing ==
DVD and Blu-ray
No.	Title	Length
1.	"Daddy Long Legs"
2.	"Come Talk to Me"
3.	"Shock the Monkey"
4.	"Family Snapshot"
5.	"Digging in the Dirt"
6.	"Secret World"
7.	"The Family and the Fishing Net"
8.	"No Self Control"
9.	"Solsbury Hill"
10.	"Show Yourself"
11.	"Red Rain"
12.	"Sledgehammer"
13.	"Don't Give Up"
14.	"That Voice Again"
15.	"Mercy Street"
16.	"Big Time"
17.	"We Do What We're Told (Milgram's 37)"
18.	"This Is The Picture (Excellent Birds)"
19.	"In Your Eyes"
20.	"The Tower That Ate People"
21.	"Biko"

== Personnel ==
- Peter Gabriel – lead vocals, piano
- David Rhodes – guitar, vocals
- Jennie Abrahamson – vocals, acoustic guitar
- Tony Levin – bass, keyboards, vocals
- David Sancious – keyboards, acoustic guitar, accordion
- Linnea Olsson – vocals, cello
- Manu Katché – drums, percussion
- Daby Touré – guest vocals on "In Your Eyes"

== Charts ==
=== Weekly charts ===
Chart performance for Back to Front
Chart (2014–19)	Peak position
Australian Music DVD (ARIA)	21
Austrian Music DVD (Ö3 Austria)	1
Dutch Music DVD (MegaCharts)	1
Finnish Music DVD (Suomen virallinen lista)	1
French Music DVD (SNEP)	2
German Albums (Offizielle Top 100)	7
Italian Music DVD (FIMI)	1
Swedish Music DVD (Sverigetopplistan)	1
Swiss Music DVD (Schweizer Hitparade)	1
UK Music Videos (OCC)	1
US Music Videos (Billboard)	1

=== Year-end charts ===
Chart performance for Back to Front
Chart (2014)	Position
US Music Videos (Billboard)	34
