= Mercy Street =

Song by Peter Gabriel

Song by Peter Gabriel

from the album So
- Released: October 1986
- Genre: Art pop; worldbeat
- Length: 6:22
- Label: Geffen
- Songwriter: Peter Gabriel
- Producers: Daniel Lanois; Peter Gabriel

So track listing
- 9 tracks Side one: 1. "Red Rain"; 2. "Sledgehammer"; 3. "Don't Give Up"; 4. "That Voice Again"; Side two: 5. "In Your Eyes"; 6. "Mercy Street"; 7. "Big Time"; 8. "We Do What We're Told (Milgram's 37)"; 9. "This Is the Picture (Excellent Birds)"

"Mercy Street" is a song written by the English rock musician Peter Gabriel from his fifth studio album So (1986). Development on the song began a few years prior to the recording sessions for So and began with some percussion tracks recorded by Djalma Corrêa in Brazil. Lyrically, the song is based on the literary works of Anne Sexton. A music video was created for "Mercy Street", which was directed by Matt Mahurin and shot in black-and-white.

== Background and composition ==
The song was inspired by the personal and confessional works of the American poet Anne Sexton, who wrote a play titled Mercy Street and a poem titled "45 Mercy Street". Gabriel had acquired a collection of Sexton's work titled To Bedlam and Part Way Back at a bookshop in New York City.

Gabriel had qualified for the Gold Pan Am Travel Anywhere Card due to the miles he accumulated on tour while flying on Pan Am, which enabled him to travel for free to any Pam Am Destination of his choosing. Gabriel selected Rio de Janeiro, Brazil, as one of his destinations to explore different rhythms and meet with different percussionists. While in Rio in the summer of 1984, he met with Djalma Corrêa, who recorded a series of percussion tracks around the forró rhythm. "Forró" was also the song's working title.

Gabriel used the forró on an early incarnation of the song, titled "Don't Break This Rhythm". He experimented with a triangle track that Corrêa had recorded, but he was not fully satisfied with the song. He then reworked the verses, changed the song to include an English folk melody and strapped on lyrics based on Sexton's work. Gabriel determined that there were enough differences to warrant the release of "Don't Break This Rhythm" and "Mercy Street" as two separate songs; "Don't Break This Rhythm" became the B-side to "Sledgehammer" and "Mercy Street" appeared on So.

== Recording ==
After Gabriel had the melody and lyrics in place to the Brazilian percussion, he invited Richard Tee to overdub a piano part. However, Gabriel later removed these additions as he believed that they made the arrangement "too complex". Tee was still credited in the liner notes despite his playing not appearing on the final record. Gabriel later worked out some ideas on the Fairlight CMI at his home studio and opted to play the parts manually rather than the instrument's Page R sequencer feature in order to achieve a human feel.

Tony Levin played bass on the majority of So, but Larry Klein recorded the bass part on "Mercy Street" instead. Gabriel explained that he was "obsessive with getting the right feel and performance" and said that Levin was unable to provide a bass part that "fit the picture" for "Mercy Street". Klein had been recording at The Wool Hall in Beckington when he was contacted by Gabriel to work on "Mercy Street" in early 1986. Upon listening to "Mercy Street", he identified that the lyrics had been inspired by Sexton's poetry, having read her work when he was a teenager.

"Mercy Street" was the first song that Gabriel and Lanois asked Klein to play on. He recorded two bass parts, one on a fretted bass and another on a fretless bass; he oriented his playing on the fretless bass around the tenth scale degree.

During one of the recording sessions for "Mercy Street", the whole song was accidentally played back ten percent slower, giving the Brazilian percussion a grainy quality. For the verses, Gabriel double tracked his vocals by recording one of his parts an octave below the main vocal. Gabriel initially struggled to record the lower vocal part, so audio engineer Kevin Killen suggested that Gabriel stay overnight at the recording studio and attempt a new vocal take the following morning around 7:00 a.m. before his voice perked up. This proved to be successful, and Gabriel attained a satisfactory vocal take within an hour.

== Critical reception ==
Both contemporary and retrospective reviewers noted Gabriel's use of Sexton's poetry in the lyrics to "Mercy Street". Jon Pareles of The New York Times highlighted some of the instrumentation, including the triangle and the flute-like textures. Writing for Rolling Stone, Tim Holmes thought that "Mercy Street" was a "wistful and melanchol[ic]" dedication to Sexton. Cashbox highlighted the "brilliant soteriology of 'Mercy Street'" in their review of So and labelled it as one of the highlights on the album. Richard Cook of Sounds said that the song's "skeletal keys" were "plain and beautiful" and were "haunted by Gabriel's voices".

Eric Harvey of Pitchfork noted the song's "misty synths" and Correa's "ululating percussion" and thought that the song offered an interpretation of Sexton's poetry that "expands her narrative universe, ending with the poet peacefully sailing on the ocean with her father." PopMatters commended Gabriel's use of Sexton's material to create "something haunting and beautiful from an idea so dark and lonely." NME listed the song as one of the "10 Most Depressing Songs Ever", describing it as a "beautifully produced number" featuring Gabriel's "usual sensitivity". They concluded that "it isn't until you're a few listens in that you understand how devastating the whole thing is."

== Music video ==
Matt Mahurin directed a black-and-white music video for "Mercy Street" that was shot in Nicaragua on a relatively low budget. Upon his arrival to Nicaragua, Gabriel gave Mahurin complete control over the creative direction of the song's music video after Mahurin informed him of some conceptual ideas that he had in mind. Gabriel said that the music video for "Mercy Street" was the only one in his discography that lacked any collaboration or creative input from him. Mahurin shot scenes of a man rowing in the middle of lake and a woman carrying out Catholic rituals. In a 2007 interview with Record Collector, Gabriel identified the music video for "Mercy Street" as "very beautiful" and cited it as one of his favorites along with "Sledgehammer", "Big Time", and "Zaar".

== Personnel ==
- Djalma Correa – surdo, congas, triangle
- Larry Klein – bass guitar
- Richard Tee – piano
- Mark Rivera – processed saxophone
- Peter Gabriel – vocals, CMI, Prophet, piano, CS-80

== Release details and cover versions ==
"Mercy Street" was released (remixed by William Orbit) on Gabriel's 1992 CD-single "Blood of Eden" and a live version from the 1993 Secret World Tour was released on Gabriel's live album's Secret World Live's companion EP, SW Live EP (1994). It was also reinterpreted by Gabriel on his 2011 orchestral album New Blood.

- Black Uhuru's 1993 Mystical Truth album presented a slightly faster tempo cover of Mercy Street.
- Pianist Herbie Hancock included an interpretation of "Mercy Street" on The New Standard, a 1996 collection of pop songs treated as though they were jazz standards.
- Fever Ray released this song as a single August 2010.
- Elbow have also released a version of the song on the 2013 album And I'll Scratch Yours. The studio album features Peter Gabriel songs from artists he covered on the companion album Scratch My Back.
