= Back to Front Tour =

2012–14 concert tour by Peter Gabriel

The Back to Front Tour
- Tour by Peter Gabriel
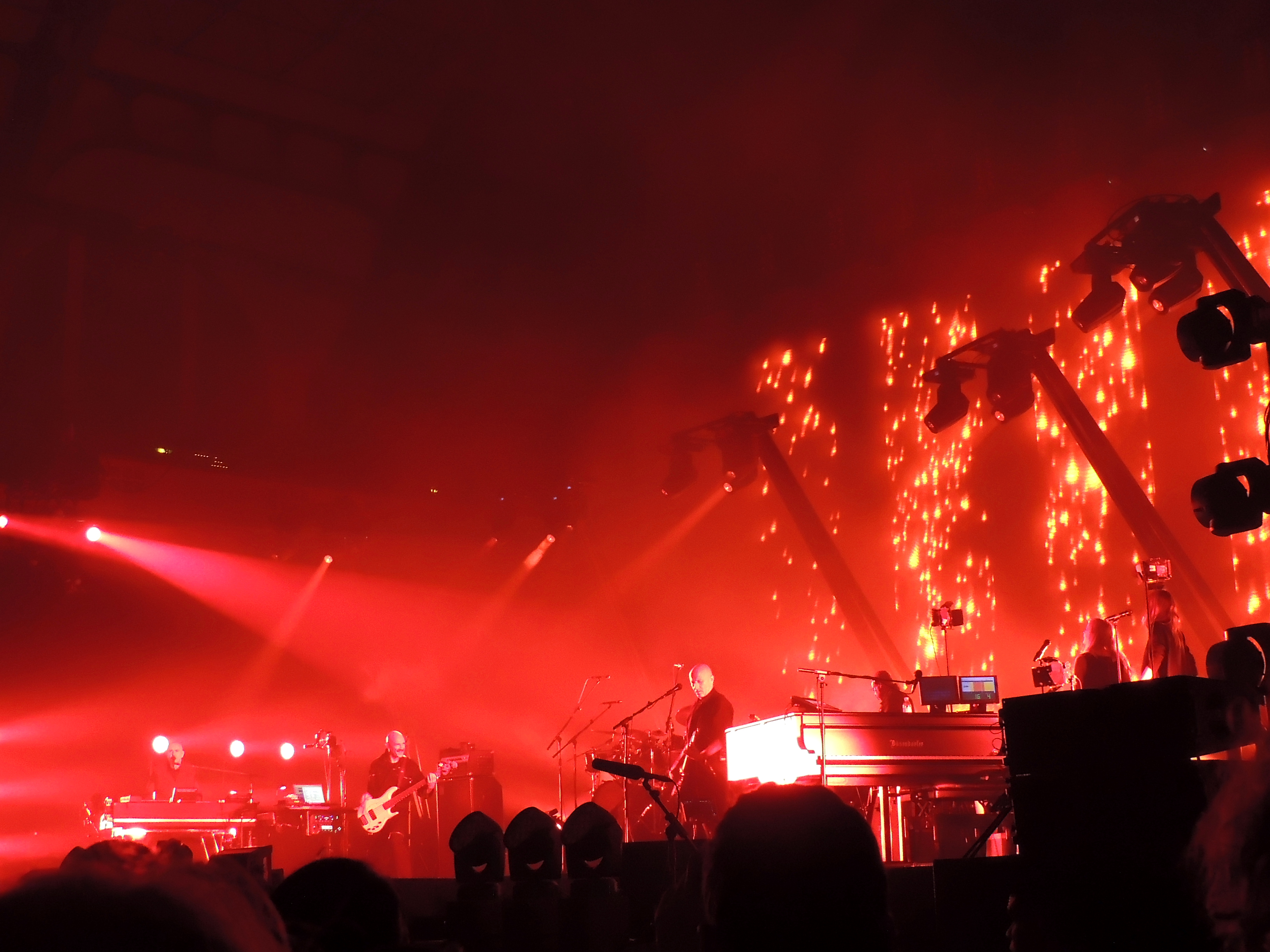
- Start date: 9 September 2012
- End date: 10 December 2014
- Legs: 2
- No. of shows: 16 in North America; 51 in Europe; 67 in total

Peter Gabriel concert chronology
- New Blood Tour (2010–12); Back to Front Tour (2012–14); Rock Paper Scissors Tour (2016)

Back to Front was a concert tour by Peter Gabriel, a retrospective performance based on every song from his 1986 multi-platinum album So played in sequence. The backing band included musicians that Gabriel toured with in 1986–87 in support of the album's initial release.

Each night of the tour was recorded and released both separately and as part of a box set entitled Back to Front: Encore Series. The releases were limited editions and available exclusively from Gabriel's official website.

On 23 June 2014, Real World Records and Eagle Rock Entertainment released the live album and film Back to Front: Live in London, recorded at the O2 concerts.

== Background ==
In 2012, Gabriel released a 25th anniversary box set of So. To coincide with this release, Gabriel decided to assemble his band from the album's accompanying tour, with David Rhodes on guitar, Tony Levin on bass, Manu Katché on drums, and David Sancious on keyboards. Youssou N'Dour, who had opened for Gabriel for his 1986-1987 tour, was unavailable to participate on the Back to Front tour as he was serving as Minister of Culture and Tourism in Senegal at the time. Gabriel was initially reluctant to play So in its entirety, but reconsidered after he witnessed Brian Wilson perform Pet Sounds from start to finish.

During the tour, Gabriel also played some new original songs, including "O But" and "What Lies Ahead". Gabriel explained that he wanted to divide the tour into three different sections. The first part of the show was an acoustic set that began with an unfinished song with the houselights on. "O But" opened the set, which was later retitled "Daddy Long Legs". The song featured Levin on upright bass and piano playing from Gabriel, who sang his vocals in gibberish. "O But" and "Daddy Long Legs" were later reworked into "Playing for Time", which appeared on Gabriel's I/O album in 2023.

The second portion of the set, which Gabriel called "the main course", included more electronic and experimental songs and the final portion of the set (labelled by Gabriel as the "dessert") was the entirety of So with the running order that he originally intended. Gabriel explained that he placed "In Your Eyes" as the final song of the main set because he originally intended for it to be the last track on So. He was unable to do so for the 1986 release of So because the vinyl format was unable to accommodate the song's lower frequencies in the bassline.

John Cusack appeared at the 6 October 2012 concert in Los Angeles, recreating a scene from Say Anything... (1989).

== Production ==
Ben Findlay served as the front of house audio engineer for The Back of Front Tour, having previously worked with Gabriel at Real World Studios. The sound system used on the tour was a 96-input Avid Profile D-Show console, with the device's native EQ features being used on the drums. Findlay grouped these drum channels together, which he saved as a snapshot to correspond with each song. A Bricasti M1 was the primary outboard gear reverb effect used on the vocals and a Quantec Yardstick was relied on for long reverb decays. With the exception of Sancious, who used floor monitors developed by Firehouse Productions, all of the members used Sennheiser 2000 IEM systems. During later legs of the tour, including the European leg, a Solid State Logic live console was used instead, which was the company's first console made for live performances. The device possessed 64-bit internal processing and 96 kHz sample rate, which Findley felt was sufficient in preventing the issue of oversampling.

Some of the sounds used on the tour were accessed from floppy discs. Gabriel encountered some difficulties in locating DAT players and some of the old floppy discs were not longer functioning. For the illumination, Gabriel referred back to an idea he had 25 years earlier about manually operating lights on a boom intended for a camera. He reused this idea for the Back to Front Tour with a couple of overhead lights, but discarded the proscenium arch that had been present on his 1986-1987 tour.

== Reception ==
Dave McKenna of The Washington Post described the 14 October 2012 concert in Fairfax as "great". He highlighted the "goofy line routines" performed by Gabriel, Tony Levin, and David Rhodes on "Sledgehammer" and "Big Time" and said that Gabriel "choked up" when introducing "Biko".

== Personnel ==
=== Musicians ===
- Peter Gabriel – vocals, piano, keyboard, tambourine
- David Rhodes – guitar and backing vocals
- Tony Levin – bass guitar, upright bass, synthesizer, backing vocals
- David Sancious – keyboards, accordion, acoustic guitar
- Manu Katché – drums, shaker
- Jennie Abrahamson – backing vocals, tambourine, 12 string acoustic guitar
- Linnea Olsson – backing vocals, synthesizer, cello

=== Tour crew ===
- Tour manager: Dave Taraskevics
- Lighting designer: Rob Sinclair
- Front of house audio engineer: Ben Findlay

== Set list ==
Acoustic (with house lights left on):

1. "Daddy Long Legs" (new unfinished song, also known as "O But", released as Playing For Time on i/o in 2023 with a full band and orchestral arrangement. Replaced by new unfinished song "What Lies Ahead" in late 2014, released on o\i in 2026 with orchestra and male voice choir)
2. "Come Talk to Me"
3. "Shock the Monkey"
4. "Family Snapshot"

Electric:

1. "Digging in the Dirt"
2. "Secret World"
3. "The Family and the Fishing Net" or "Darkness" (December 2014)
4. "No Self Control"
5. "Games Without Frontiers" (in Herning and Amsterdam only)
6. "Solsbury Hill" (played after "Washing of the Water" for first show in Quebec City)
7. "Washing of the Water" or "Humdrum" (2012 tour), "Why Don't You Show Yourself" (2013 and 2014 tours)

So:

1. "Red Rain"
2. "Sledgehammer"
3. "Don't Give Up"
4. "That Voice Again"
5. "Mercy Street"
6. "Big Time"
7. "We Do What We're Told (Milgram's 37)"
8. "This Is the Picture (Excellent Birds)"
9. "In Your Eyes"

Encore:

1. "Here Comes the Flood" (played 11 times in mid 2014)
2. "The Tower That Ate People"
3. "Biko"

== Tour dates ==
List of 2012 concerts
Date	City	Country	Venue	Attendance	Revenue
16 September 2012	Quebec City	Canada	Colisée Pepsi	8,652 / 10,006	$914,352
18 September 2012	Montreal	Canada	Bell Centre	11,902 / 11,902	$1,277,415
19 September 2012	Toronto	Canada	Air Canada Centre	11,267 / 12,159	$1,098,899
21 September 2012	Philadelphia	United States	Wells Fargo Center	11,773 / 12,809	$1,111,651
23 September 2012	Wantagh	United States	Jones Beach Theater	10,602 / 13,995	$991,035
24 September 2012	Boston	United States	TD Garden	5,671 / 9,215	$519,413
26 September 2012	Auburn Hills	United States	The Palace of Auburn Hills	—	—
27 September 2012	Chicago	United States	United Center	9,886 / 10,863	$967,504
30 September 2012	Morrison	United States	Red Rocks Amphitheatre	8,631 / 8,631	$787,067
2 October 2012	San Jose	United States	HP Pavilion at San Jose	6,964 / 7,500	$710,388
5 October 2012	Las Vegas	United States	PH Live Showroom	—	—
6 October 2012	Los Angeles	United States	Hollywood Bowl	15,482 / 17,416	$1,527,290
8 October 2012	San Diego	United States	Valley View Casino Center	—	—
9 October 2012	Santa Barbara	United States	Santa Barbara Bowl	3,972 / 4,549	$432,182
13 October 2012	Uncasville	United States	Mohegan Sun Arena	4,150 / 4,497	$379,490
14 October 2012	Fairfax	United States	Patriot Center	5,812 / 5,812	$546,621

List of 2013 concerts
Date	City	Country	Venue	Attendance	Revenue
28 September 2013	Herning	Denmark	Jyske Bank Arena	6,500	—
30 September 2013	Amsterdam	Netherlands	Ziggo Dome	—	—
1 October 2013	Brussels	Belgium	Forest National	8,000	—
3 October 2013	Vienna	Austria	Wiener Stadthalle	10,000	—
5 October 2013	Belgrade	Serbia	Kombank Arena	—	—
7 October 2013	Milan	Italy	Mediolanum Forum	11,000	—
8 October 2013	Geneva	Switzerland	Geneva Arena	8,000	—
10 October 2013	Prague	Czech Republic	O_{2} Arena	12,000	—
11 October 2013	Leipzig	Germany	Arena Leipzig	10,000	—
13 October 2013	Stuttgart	Germany	Schleyerhalle	12,000	—
15 October 2013	Paris	France	Palais Omnisports de Bercy	16,000	—
16 October 2013	Düsseldorf	Germany	ISS Dome	10,000	—
18 October 2013	Hamburg	Germany	O_{2} World Hamburg	12,035 / 12,730	$876,611
19 October 2013	Berlin	Germany	O_{2} World Berlin	13,468 / 13,468	$1,060,450
21 October 2013	London	England	The O_{2} Arena	22,584 / 27,739	$1,762,780
22 October 2013	London	England	The O_{2} Arena	22,584 / 27,739	$1,762,780
24 October 2013	Glasgow	Scotland	SSE Hydro	—	—
25 October 2013	Manchester	England	Phones 4u Arena	14,057 / 15,105	$913,023

List of 2014 concerts
Date	City	Country	Venue	Attendance	Revenue
29 April 2014	Frankfurt	Germany	Festhalle Frankfurt	11,000	—
30 April 2014	Munich	Germany	Olympiahalle	11,000	—
2 May 2014	Cologne	Germany	Lanxess Arena	15,000	—
3 May 2014	Hanover	Germany	TUI Arena	12,500	—
5 May 2014	Bratislava	Slovakia	Slovnaft Arena	—	—
6 May 2014	Budapest	Hungary	Budapest Sports Arena	—	—
8 May 2014	Bucharest	Romania	Romexpo Pavilionul Central	—	—
12 May 2014	Łódź	Poland	Atlas Arena	13,000	—
13 May 2014	Ostrava	Czech Republic	ČEZ Aréna	—	—
16 May 2014	Vilnius	Lithuania	Siemens Arena	—	—
17 May 2014	Riga	Latvia	Arena Riga	—	—
20 May 2014	Helsinki	Finland	Hartwall Arena	—	—
22 May 2014	Stockholm	Sweden	Ericsson Globe	10,950	—
23 May 2014	Oslo	Norway	Oslo Spektrum	7,000	—
25 May 2014	Berlin	Germany	Waldbühne	20,000	—
12 November 2014	Brussels	Belgium	Palais 12	9,000	—
13 November 2014	Strasbourg	France	Zénith de Strasbourg	8,000	—
15 November 2014	Nantes	France	Zénith de Nantes Métropole	8,000	—
16 November 2014	Toulouse	France	Zénith de Toulouse	8,000	—
18 November 2014	Zürich	Switzerland	Hallenstadion	7,212 / 13,000	$597,346
20 November 2014	Turin	Italy	Pala Alpitour	—	—
21 November 2014	Bologna	Italy	Unipol Arena	—	—
23 November 2014	Graz	Austria	Stadthalle Graz	4,000	—
24 November 2014	Salzburg	Austria	Salzburgarena	—	—
28 November 2014	Birmingham	England	LG Arena	—	—
30 November 2014	Sheffield	England	Motorpoint Arena Sheffield	—	—
1 December 2014	Cardiff	Wales	Motorpoint Arena Cardiff	—	—
3 December 2014	London	England	SSE Wembley Arena	—	—
4 December 2014	Newcastle	England	Metro Radio Arena		
7 December 2014	Liverpool	England	Echo Arena Liverpool	—	—
8 December 2014	Aberdeen	Scotland	AECC Arena	4,600	—
10 December 2014	Dublin	Ireland	3Arena	—	—

Cancellations and rescheduled shows

5 October 2013	Zagreb, Croatia	Arena Zagreb	Venue changed to Kombank Arena, Belgrade, Serbia
10 May 2014	Kyiv, Ukraine	Palace of Sports	Canceled
26 November 2014	Lyon, France	Halle Tony Garnier	Canceled
