= Jennie Abrahamson =

Swedish singer and songwriter

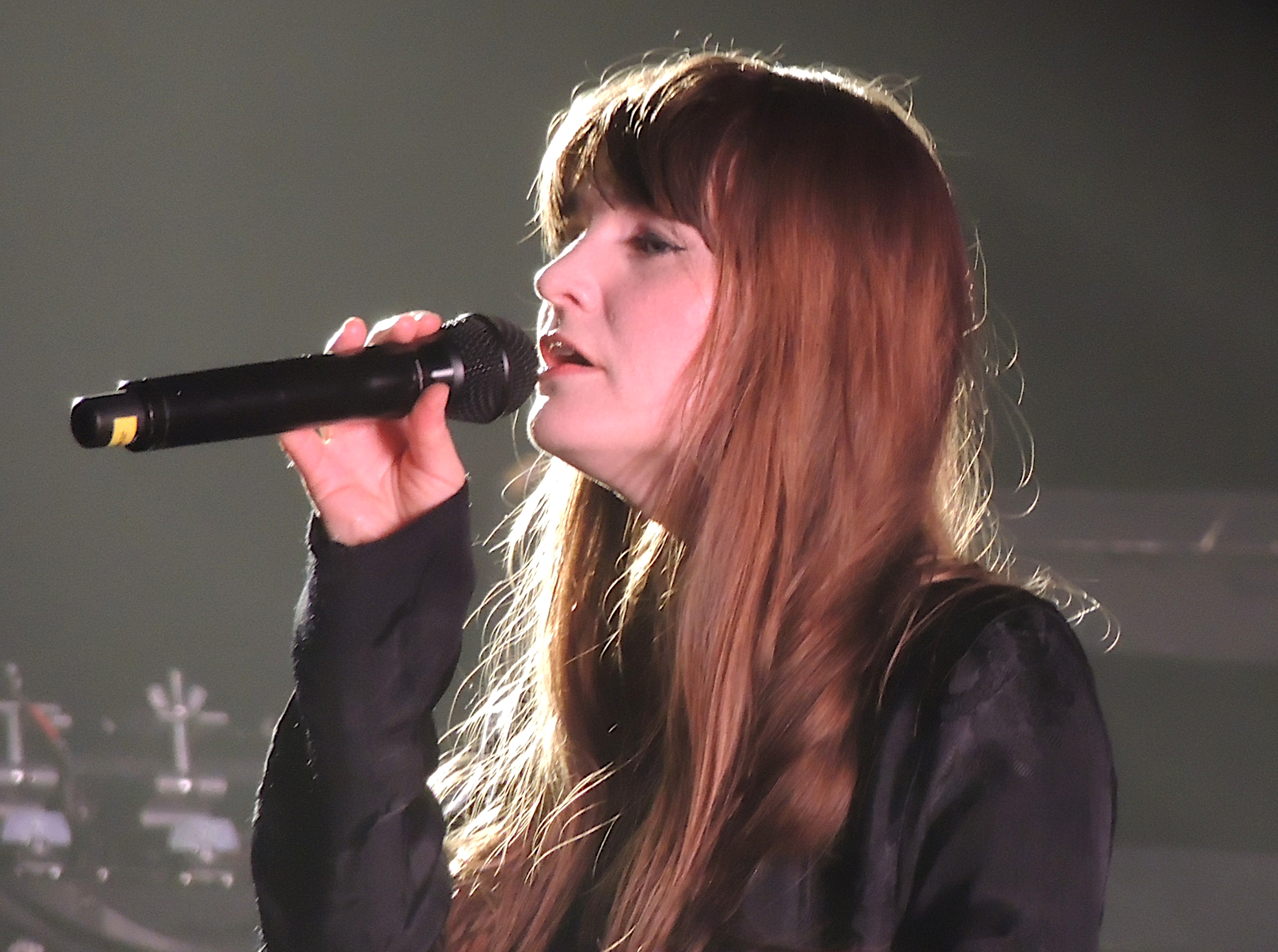

Background information
- Born: 28 May 1978 (age 47); Sävar (Sweden)
- Occupations: Musician, songwriter, singer
- Instruments: Vocals, percussion, guitars, piano, keyboards, tambourine
- Labels: How Sweet The Sound, Avant Garden Records
- Website: jennieabrahamson.com

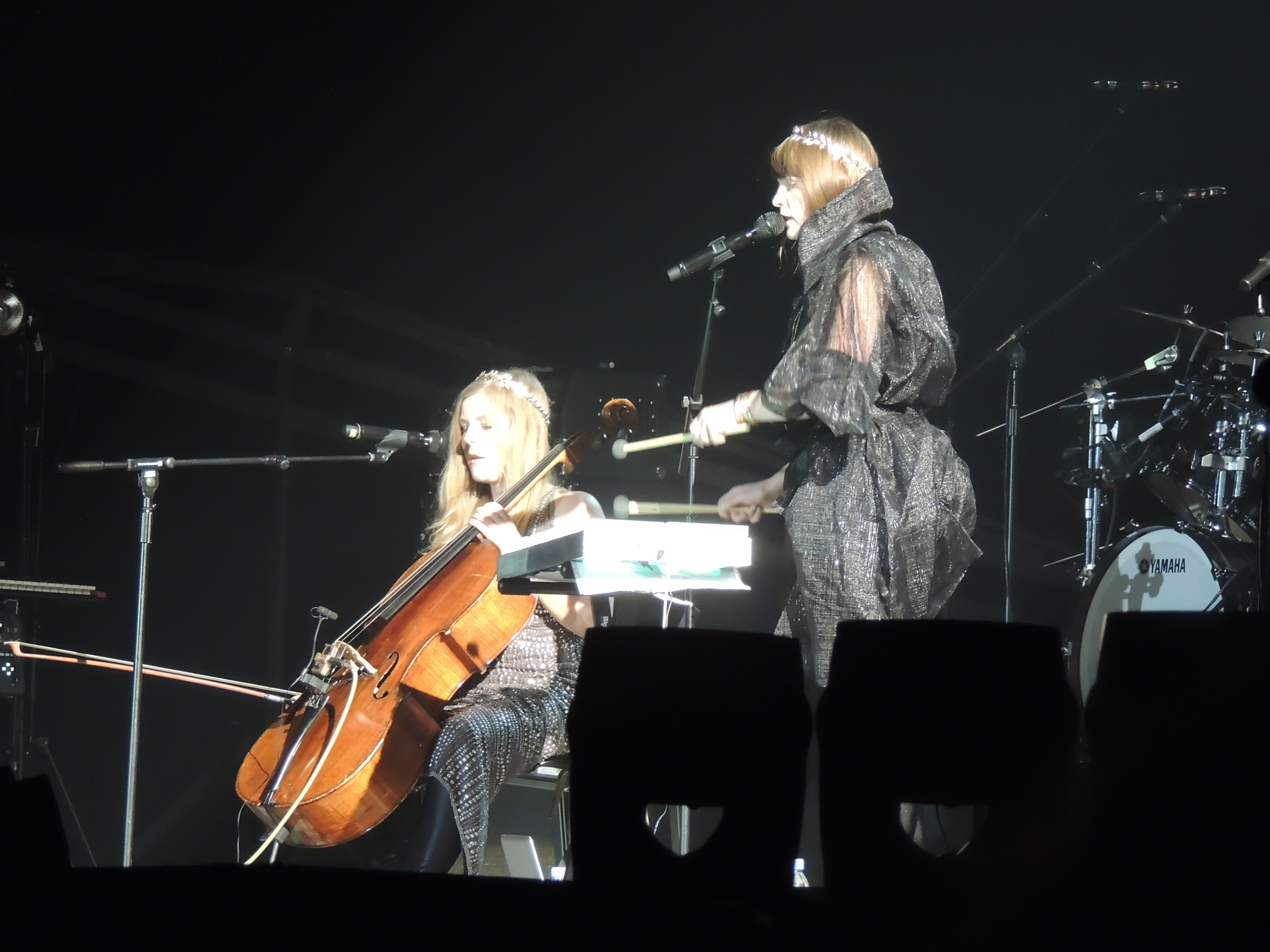
Jennie Abrahamson with Linnea Olsson (left) as support act at Peter Gabriel's Back to Front Tour 2014 at Festhalle in Frankfurt, Germany

Jennie Helena Abrahamson (born 28 May 1978, in Sävar) is a Swedish pop singer-songwriter. Born near the northern Swedish city of Umeå, she now lives in Stockholm's Södermalm district.

== Career ==
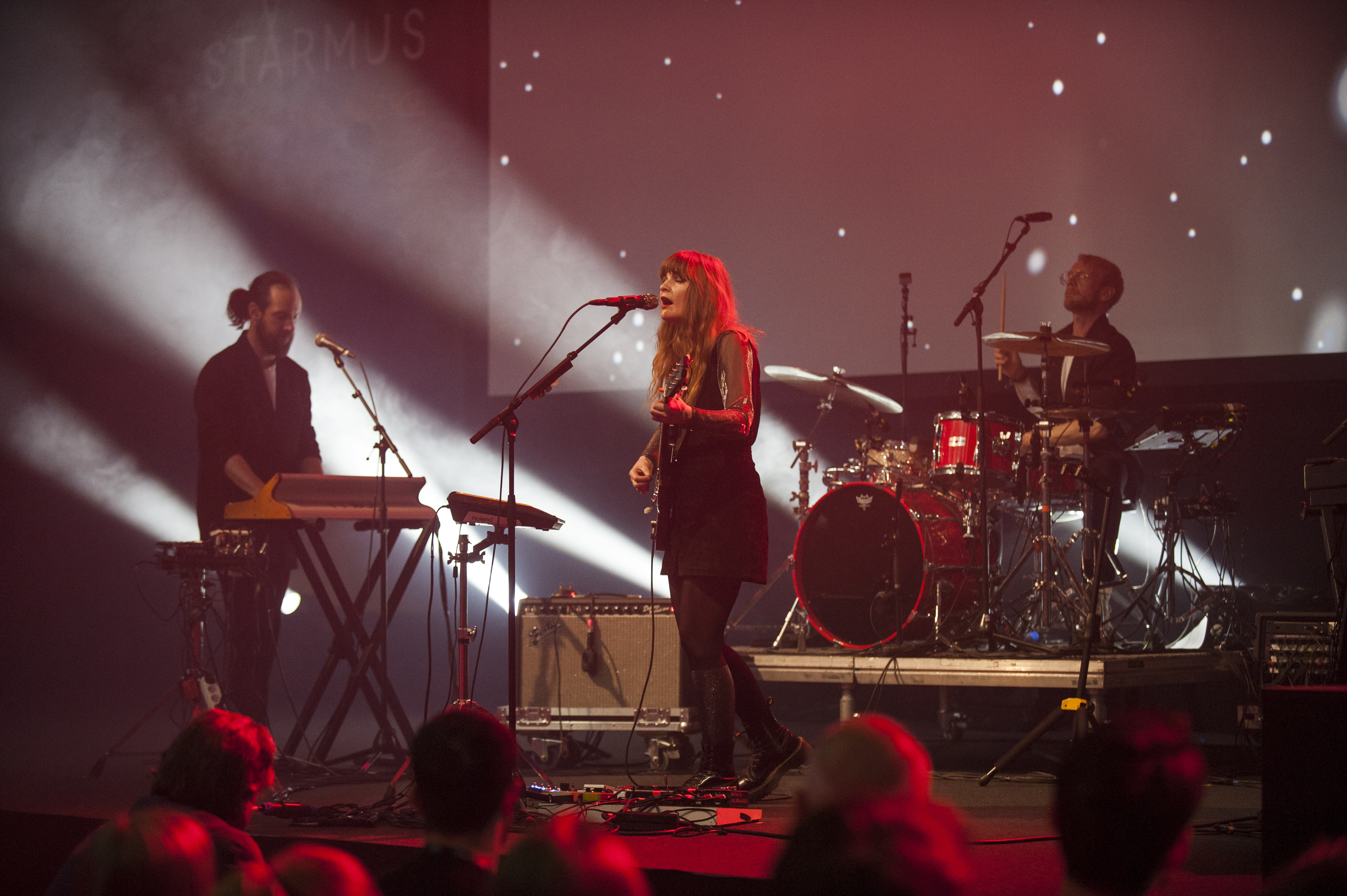
Jennie Abrahamson with Band in Trondheim, Norway 2017

After initially playing in various bands and collaborating with changing other artists, she launched a solo career in Sweden in 2006. Supported by her friends Friska Viljor and Ane Brun, Abrahamson founded her own record label in 2007.

She also runs a recording studio in Stockholm with her longtime partner Johannes Berglund.

She is often critical of the adversities of the music business. She originally studied psychology and was considering returning to this field when she received the request to go on tour with Peter Gabriel.

She toured with Peter Gabriel on his Back to Front-So tour in 2013 and 2014 together with Linnea Olsson. Both replaced the ill Ane Brun and her band as support act. Linnea Olsson also replaced Ane Brun as a background singer, together with Jennie Abrahamson, at the concerts in North America and Europe.

I was 9 when the SO album came out, and reading my written pages between the ages of 9–14, my favourite artist was: Peter Gabriel. My favourite song: Don’t give up, Red rain, That voice again. What I dreamt of becoming: a singer, musician and artist. Had I known!!!!! I guess you all can see where I’m going with this. The conclusion being: life is truly surprising sometimes.

— Jennie Abrahamson, jennieabrahamson.com, 2014

During this tour, she also took over Kate Bush's vocal parts on the songs "No Self Control" and "Don't Give Up". She appears on "Love Can Heal" on Gabriel's tenth album i/o.

== Discography ==
Since 2006 Abrahamson has recorded six solo albums, from which some single releases were successful in Sweden, Germany and France.

=== Albums ===
- Lights (2007)
- While the Sun's Still Up and the Sky Is Bright (2009)
- The Sound of Your Beating Heart (2011)
- Gemini Gemini (2014)
- Reverseries (2017)
- Kärlek & Makt (2023)

=== Singles ===
- Late Night Show (aus While the Sun's Still Up and the Sky Is Bright) (2009)
- Hard to Come By (aus The Sound of Your Beating Heart) (2011)
- Wolf Hour (aus The Sound of Your Beating Heart) (2011)
- The War (2014)
- Wolf (2015)
- Bloodlines (2016)
- Safe Tonight (2017)
- Anyone Who (2017)
- My Favorite Things (2018)
- Kropp och Liv
- Du kommer aldrig (2022)
- Om du vill gå (2023)
