= Stephen R. Johnson =

American film director (1952–2015)

- Johnson holding his MTV "Moonman" awards (1987).
- Born: July 12, 1952; Paola, Kansas, U.S.
- Died: January 26, 2015 (aged 62); Fort Scott, Kansas, U.S.
- Occupations: Director; painter; writer

Stephen Russell Johnson (July 12, 1952 – January 26, 2015) was an American music video director, television director, animator, painter, and writer.

== Early life and education ==
Johnson was born on July 12, 1952, in Paola, Kansas, the son of Russell and Lena Wheeler Johnson. He attended high school in Pleasanton, Kansas. He then attended college at the University of Kansas and the University of Southern California. At USC Film School, he made an award-winning movie using stop-motion techniques – as did many of his music videos.

== Career ==
Johnson got his start directing a music video for the song "Girls Like You" by Combonation, which features a young Robin Wright, before moving on to directing videos for popular artists. Johnson directed three music videos for Peter Gabriel: "Big Time", "Steam", and "Sledgehammer". "Sledgehammer" has the distinction of winning nine MTV Video Music Awards, which remains unsurpassed.

In addition, Johnson directed the videos for "Road to Nowhere" by Talking Heads, and "The Bug" and "Walk of Life" by Dire Straits.

In addition to directing music videos, Johnson was known for directing all thirteen episodes of the first season of Pee-wee's Playhouse, for which he was nominated for a Daytime Emmy Award for Outstanding Directing in Children's Programming. He also spearheaded the creation of the short film Universal Declaration of Human Rights for Amnesty International, based on the thirty articles of the Universal Declaration of Human Rights created by the United Nations. The film is composed of animated interpretations of the articles from forty-two different animators.

== Death ==
Johnson died at the age of 62 on January 26, 2015, in Fort Scott, Kansas, from cardiac complications.
