= Big Time (Peter Gabriel song) =

1986 Peter Gabriel song

Single by Peter Gabriel

from the album So
- B-side: "We Do What We're Told (Milgram's 37)" (US); "Curtains" (UK)
- Released: November 1986 (US); 16 March 1987 (UK)
- Genre: Funk rock; dance-rock
- Length: 4:26
- Label: Virgin; Geffen
- Songwriter: Peter Gabriel
- Producers: Daniel Lanois; Peter Gabriel

Peter Gabriel singles chronology
"In Your Eyes" (1986)	"Big Time" (1986)	"Red Rain" (1987)

Music video
- "Big Time" on YouTube

"Big Time" is a song by the English rock musician Peter Gabriel from his fifth studio album So (1986). It was his second top-ten single on the US Billboard Hot 100, peaking at no. 8. Elsewhere, the song also reached the top 20 in Belgium, Canada, Luxembourg, New Zealand and the UK.

== Recording ==
"Big Time" underwent many permutations before being finalized; Jerry Marotta remembers an early version of the song, which he described as more intense and so far out from the released version that it "would not have been a hit".

The song's bass guitar part is unique in that backing bassist Tony Levin and drummer Marotta teamed up to record it. Levin handled the fingerings while Marotta hit the strings with his drumsticks, resulting in a percussive sound; it was inspired by a technique developed by Gene Krupa in the 1940s or early 1950s. Inspired by this sound, Levin later invented funk fingers, small drumstick ends that could be attached to the fingertips in order to reproduce it during live performances.

The drum parts were a considerable challenge to record – Gabriel requested that Marotta, Manu Katché and Stewart Copeland each play a take over a guide drum pattern from a LinnDrum. Marotta recorded a drum part with a harder rock feel, but Gabriel instead opted for Copeland's "lighter, poppier approach". Gabriel liked Copeland's drum take but felt that it did not quite lock in rhythmically with the Linn. He said, "I love Stewart's playing. He's not the world's best timekeeper, as he would be first to admit, but he can drive a track like very few others; it's always ahead of the beat, sits right up and forward, and his kit always sounds very alive."

To get around the timing problems for the drums, Kevin Killen sampled sections of Copeland's playing that lined up best with the drum machine. Gabriel additionally wanted to incorporate Copeland's drum fills, which were also meticulously sampled and adjusted to align with the rest of the song.

== Release ==
"Big Time" was released in the UK by Virgin Records on 16 March 1987, with the song "Curtains" serving as the primary B-side. The CD single also featured "No Self Control" and "Across the River", the latter of which was included on a 1982 WOMAD album. Music Week had reported that they nearly placed "Big Time" on both the UK album charts and the singles charts since the CD single exceeded the 25 minute cap and also carried a retail price similar to an album. The publication's research manager ultimately decided against placing "Big Time" on the UK albums chart over their belief that a simultaneous appearance on the singles and albums chart would be "odd".

== Critical reception ==
Cash Box said that the song "features Gabriel in a characteristic lyrical goldmine delivering a passionate, believable vocal". Billboard called it a "dynamic, big-room funk-rocker" that recreates the old Memphis sound. Music Week called the song "another corker with a fab video to accompany its riveting beat." The Los Angeles Times was more critical and labeled the song as the album's "biggest failure", arguing that it was "a satire on ego and ambition that says nothing we haven't heard from lesser observers many times before".

== Music video ==
The visual style was very similar to the "Sledgehammer" video, using stop motion claymation by David Daniels and strata-cut animation. The larger video was supervised by director Stephen R. Johnson and produced by Prudence Fenton. It was shot at Peter Wallach Studios. Artist Wayne White served as the art director for the music video. The music video won three categories at the 1987 Billboard Video Music Awards, specifically the awards for Best Direction, Best Art Direction, and Best Editing.

== Live performances ==
"Big Time" made its live debut on Gabriel's 1986–87 This Way Up Tour. When rehearsing "Big Time" for this tour, Katché lobbied against the use of a drum machine pattern to accompany his drumming, but the decision was made to include the drum programming so that the live renditions would bear a closer resemblance to the studio recording. Gabriel also performed the song live on his 2012–2014 Back to Front Tour and 2023 I/O The Tour.

== Track listing ==
7" US (Geffen 28503)

1. "Big Time" (4:24)
2. "We Do What We're Told (Milgram's 37)" (3:20)

7" US (Geffen 28503-DJ)

1. "Big Time" (Fade) (3:12)
2. "Big Time" (4:24)

12" US (Geffen 20600)

1. "Big Time" (Dance Mix)) (6:10)
2. "In Your Eyes" (Special Mix) (7:14)
3. "We Do What We're Told (Milgram's 37)" (3:18)

7" UK (PGS-3)

1. "Big Time" (7" edit)
2. "Curtains"

12" UK (PGS3-12)

1. "Big Time" (extended version)
2. "Big Time" (7" edit)
3. "Curtains"

Cassette single UK (PGT-312)

1. "Big Time" (extended version)
2. "Curtains"
3. "No Self Control" (live version)
4. "Across the River"

CD-single UK (GAIL 312)
No.	Title	Length
1.	"Big Time" (extended version)	6:14
2.	"Curtains"	3:28
3.	"No Self Control"	3:54
4.	"Across the River"	7:12
5.	"Big Time" (seven-inch version)	4:26
Total length:		25:14

== Personnel ==
Credits adapted from the album So:

- Peter Gabriel – vocals, CMI, Prophet, Linn
- Stewart Copeland – drums
- Simon Clark – Hammond, CMI, bass
- Tony Levin, Jerry Marotta – drumstick bass
- David Rhodes – guitar
- Daniel Lanois – surf guitar
- Jimmy Bralower – Linn kick
- Wayne Jackson – trumpet, cornet
- Mark Rivera – alto, tenor and baritone saxophone
- Don Mikkelsen – trombone
- P. P. Arnold, Coral Gordon, Dee Lewis – backing vocals

== Chart performance ==
=== Weekly charts ===
Chart (1986–1987)	Peak position
Australia (Kent Music Report)	37
Belgium (Ultratop 50 Flanders)	19
Canada Top Singles (RPM)	15
Europe (European Hot 100 Singles)	17
Germany (GfK)	38
Ireland (IRMA)	11
Luxembourg (Radio Luxembourg)	9
Netherlands (Dutch Top 40)	24
Netherlands (Single Top 100)	25
New Zealand (Recorded Music NZ)	19
UK Singles (Official Charts)	13
US Billboard Hot 100	8
US Mainstream Rock (Billboard)	3
US Cash Box	8

=== Year-end charts ===
Chart (1987)	Position
Canada Top Singles (RPM)	91
US Billboard Hot 100	75

== In popular culture ==
"Big Time" was used in 2006 by WWE as the main theme for WrestleMania 22. It is featured in the intro of the documentary film Inside Job (2010).

The B-side, "Curtains", was not released in digital format until 2004, when the "Broad mix" of the song was featured in the videogame Myst IV: Revelation, to which Gabriel also lent his voice as an actor.

The song was featured in the 2014 animated comedy film Postman Pat: The Movie.

The song was featured in an episode of the American coming-of-age sitcom Young Sheldon.
