= Linnea Olsson =

Swedish singer-songwriter and multi-instrumentalist (born 1983)

- Olsson in 2014

Background information
- Born: Linnea Matilda Olsson; 1983 (age 42–43); Sweden
- Genres: Indie folk; art rock; world music; worldbeat; pop; neo-classical; progressive rock
- Occupations: Musician; songwriter
- Instruments: Vocals; cello; guitar; bass; keyboards; drums; percussion
- Label: Sony Music
- Formerly of: Isildurs Bane
- Website: www.linneaolsson.net at the Wayback Machine (archived 2018-10-04)

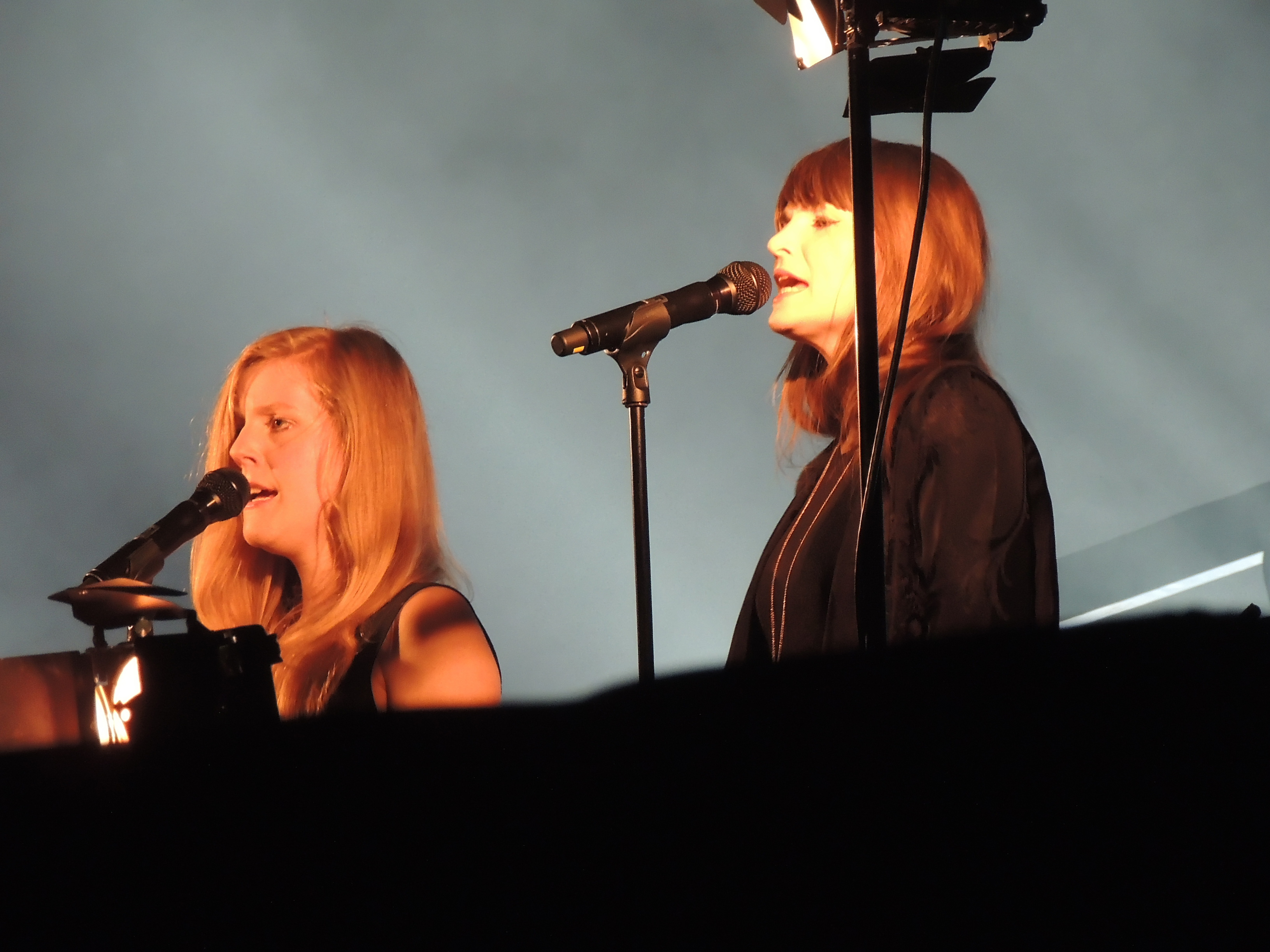
Linnea Olsson (left) with Jennie Abrahamson during the Back to Front Tour of Peter Gabriel 2014 at Festhalle Frankfurt

Linnea Matilda Olsson (born 1983) is a Swedish singer-songwriter and multi-instrumentalist, best known and acclaimed as a cellist. A former member of the band Isildurs Bane, she released her first album, Ah!, in 2012, followed by a second album Breaking and Shaking in 2014.

Together with Jennie Abrahamson, she was an opening act Jennie + Linnea and background singer and tour cellist on Peter Gabriel's Back to Front-So tour from 2012 to the end of 2014. Both thus replaced the originally scheduled Ane Brun with her band as support act, which would have also included Linnea Olsson, and Linnea Olsson replaced Ane Brun as background singer.

She was the singer for the 2019 rhythm-action video game Sayonara Wild Hearts, with music composed by Daniel Olsén and Jonathan Eng.

== Discography ==
=== Albums ===
- 2012: Ah! (Götterfunk Produktion)
- 2014: Breaking and Shaking (Götterfunk Produktions, Sony)
- 2017: For Show (Götterfunk Produktions)
- 2019: Sayonara Wild Hearts (Simogo AB)
- 2024: Lorelei and the Laser Eyes (Simogo AB)
