= That Voice Again =

Promotional single by Peter Gabriel

from the album So
- Released: 1986
- Genre: Pop; rock
- Length: 4:52
- Label: Charisma; Geffen
- Songwriters: Peter Gabriel; David Rhodes
- Producers: Peter Gabriel; Daniel Lanois

"That Voice Again" is a song by English rock musician Peter Gabriel from his 1986 album So. He wrote the song with a fictional character named Mozo in mind, who Gabriel created with the intention of including several songs across his albums with the character in mind. Along with "Red Rain", "That Voice Again" is the final Gabriel song that is related to the character of Mozo. Geffen Records released "That Voice Again" as a promotional single in the United States, where it reached No. 14 on the Billboard Album Rock Tracks chart.

== Background ==
In 1983, Gabriel was approached by Martin Scorsese to develop the soundtrack for The Last Temptation of Christ, although the release date of the film was ultimately pushed back to 1988. Under the working title "The First Stone", Gabriel originally incorporated biblical themes from the Old Testament into the lyrics, specifically referencing the line "let him first cast a stone" from John 8:7. He later altered the lyrics to be less religious and more introspective to reflect his attempts at being less judgemental. These lyrics pertained to judgment on a personal and global scale, but Gabriel remained dissatisfied with some of the words.

After attempting three different sets of lyrics, Gabriel solicited the assistance of guitarist David Rhodes, who helped him "loosen a few syllables here and there." He ultimately settled on lyrics that examined "the parental voice in our heads that either helps or defeats us".

"That Voice Again" is about judgmental attitudes being a barrier between people. The voice is the voice of judgment. A haunting internal voice that instead of accepting experience is always analyzing, moralizing and evaluating it.

Along with "Red Rain", "That Voice Again" is Gabriel's final song to be associated with his aborted story surrounding the fictional character of Mozo, a "mercurial stranger" loosely based on Moses and the alchemical treatise Aurora consurgens. Gabriel dispersed several songs related to Mozo on his albums up through So in 1986, with "Here Comes the Flood" and "Down the Dolce Vita" first referencing the character on Gabriel's 1977 debut solo album. He intended for his Mozo songs to comprise a complete story when assembled together. Within the context of the Mozo story, "That Voice Again" represented the attribute of judgment. In 1987, Gabriel considered developing a one-hour video revolving around Mozo, but he ultimately never brought this idea to fruition.

== Recording ==
Gabriel gravitated toward the 12-string guitar during the recording sessions; the instrument had not appeared on any of his compositions since the 1974 release of The Lamb Lies Down on Broadway, which was his final album with Genesis. After his departure from Genesis, Gabriel opted against the use of the 12-string guitar on his solo material, but he later decided that "ten years was long enough".

Gabriel took some musical inspiration from The Byrds when creating some of the song's instrumentation. The song's 12-string guitar was played by Daniel Lanois and Rhodes covered the electric guitar parts. Similar to "Red Rain", the first song on So, "That Voice Again" begins with an instrumental interlude followed by the chorus, which features multitracked vocals overdubbed by Gabriel.

For each chorus, Manu Katché played a drum fill that he described as having a Count Basie feel reminiscent of what would be found in big band music. Katché reckoned in a 1987 interview with Modern Drummer that he likely would not have contributed the drum flourish without Gabriel and Lanois present in the recording studio and that they encouraged him to innovate with his parts. Gabriel highlighted the musicianship on "That Voice Again" in a 1986 interview with Billboard, saying "There's some great moments on that between Manu and Tony Levin. I've grown quite attached to that sound".

The final syllable of the lyric "only love can make love" was sustained by Gabriel for over ten seconds. Following another chorus, the song concludes with a percussion pattern and a "sudden chord", as described by music critic Durrell Bowman.

== Release and reception ==
The song was serviced to AOR stations and debuted at number 55 on the Radio & Records AOR national airplay listing for the week dated 12 September 1986. For the week of 10 October 1986, the song received 27 adds to AOR stations reporting to Radio & Records, making it the fifth most added song in that format. The following week, 64 percent of AOR radio stations reporting to Radio & Records were playing the song. For the week dated 15 November 1986, "That Voice Again" peaked at number 14 on the Billboard Album Rock chart.

A solo piano rendition of "That Voice Again", taken from Gabriel's 2004 performance at the Newport Beach Film Festival, appeared on the documentary film, Growing Up on Tour: A Family Portrait. For the 2012 So box set, a "DNA" version of "That Voice Again" was included, which comprised a series of early takes segmented together to demonstrate the studio progression of the track. This recording included some alternate wordless vocal melodies from Gabriel and some unused vocals from Yousou N'Dour. Gabriel performed "That Voice Again" on his 2012–2014 Back to Front Tour, with a recording from the tour also appearing on Back to Front: Live in London in 2014.

Louder identified "That Voice Again" as a "beautiful, Byrds-like pop song that often gets overlooked amid the album's plentiful highlights." The Quietus called the song "far from subdued" and highlighted the drumming of Manu Katché. Pitchfork said that apart from "Sledgehammer", "That Voice Again" had the strongest chorus on So and the "most biting lyric". Ultimate Classic Rock thought that Gabriel demonstrated an "exquisite vocal delicacy on the yearning, piano-dazzled 'That Voice Again' — a love song torn apart by self-doubt." Uncut was more critical of the production choices, saying that some of the song's keyboard sounds detracted from the listening experience.

Gabriel has expressed varying opinions of "That Voice Again". During a 1992 interview with the Gavin Report, Gabriel cited "That Voice Again" as one of the songs on So that he was not "completely satisfied with". In the liner notes for the 2012 reissue of So, Gabriel identified "That Voice Again" as one of his favorite songs on the album.

== Personnel ==
- Peter Gabriel – lead and backing vocals, Fairlight CMI, Prophet-5, piano, percussion
- David Rhodes – guitar, backing vocals
- Daniel Lanois – guitar
- Tony Levin – bass guitar
- Manu Katché – drums, percussion
- L. Shankar – violin

== Chart performance ==
Chart (1986)	Peak position
US Mainstream Rock (Billboard)	14
