= Playing for Time (song) =

Single by Peter Gabriel

from the album I/O
- Released: 7 March 2023 (dark-side mix); 21 March 2023 (bright-side and in-side mixes)
- Studio: Real World (Wiltshire); The Beehive (London); British Grove (London)
- Genre: Art pop; art rock
- Length: 6:17
- Label: Real World; EMI; Republic
- Songwriter: Peter Gabriel
- Producer: Peter Gabriel

Peter Gabriel singles chronology
"The Court" (2023)	"Playing for Time" (2023)	"I/O" (2023)

"Playing for Time" is a song by English musician Peter Gabriel, released in March 2023 as the third single in promotion of his tenth studio album I/O. This is his first album of original material since 2002's Up. Two versions of the song have been released: the "Bright Side Mix" (mixed by Mark "Spike" Stent) and the "Dark Side Mix" (mixed by Tchad Blake). The cover art for this track features Annette Messager's Mes voeux (avec nos cheveux). Recorded at Gabriel's Real World Studios in Wiltshire and the Beehive and British Grove Studios in London, "Playing for Time" features regulars Tony Levin on bass and Manu Katché on drums. The single was released on March 7 and the full moon, called the Worm Moon.

== Development ==
In its unfinished form, "Playing for Time" was performed on Back to Front Tour from 2012 to 2014, opening almost all shows. Gabriel first performed the song on 7 September 2012 in Quebec during rehearsals for the Back to Front Tour. At that time, these performances lacked proper lyrics and only included piano and upright bass instrumentation. The song was initially known as "O But", but it later morphed into "Daddy Long Legs".

Gabriel wanted the unfinished song to demonstrate the creative process of working through material in a rehearsal room; he would then juxtapose this track with the comparatively more polished material included later in the setlist. During introductions of the song, Gabriel would elaborate on this rationale by telling the audience that "the journey and the search can be as interesting as the destination or the arrival." In 2014, a recording of the song from one of Gabriel's October 2013 performances at The O2 Arena was included on Gabriel's Back to Front: Live in London album.

Gabriel later performed "Playing for Time" during his 2023 I/O The Tour, where it was included in the first set after "Digging in the Dirt". On 19 June 2023, studio pianist Tom Cawley appeared as a guest musician on "Playing for Time" for Gabriel's performance at The O2 Arena.

== Composition and recording ==
Gabriel began development on "Playing for Time" in 2007. He decided to experiment with chromatic scales on the piano after concluding that he had rarely used this compositional technique in the past. Once he settled on the song's opening chords, Gabriel then decided to augment the composition with a melody that he described as having a "retro" feel. The 2007 demo that he prepared possessed a slower tempo than the final versions that appeared on i/o.

The song later went through further iterations, including a version recorded in September 2021 with Manu Katché on drums, Tom Cawley on piano, David Rhodes on guitar, Levin on bass, and Gabriel contributing vocals and synth chimes. However, Gabriel felt that the third version of the song he worked on, which featured a largely acoustic arrangement, aligned more closely with his initial intentions. When asked about the song's meaning, Gabriel stated that:

"It is more of a personal song about how you assemble memories and whether we are prisoners of time or whether that is something that can actually free us. I do think it's good to push yourself towards more bold or interesting experiences because then you will have richer memories to feed you when you get to my age. You also get taught by every meaningful experience that you go through."

Cawley, who played piano on Gabriel's New Blood Tour, appears on the final recording along with many musicians from the New Blood Orchestra. The orchestral arrangements were done by Edward Shearmur, who previously handled the orchestration for Gabriel's cover of "That'll Do" from the Babe: Pig in the City soundtrack. Gabriel has also stated that the non-profit organization Long Now Foundation was an influence on the "Playing for Time".

== Critical reception ==
In his review of I/O, Alexis Petridis of The Guardian said that "Playing for Time" was a "highlight" on the album. He said that the ballad "slowly moves to a dramatic climax" and compared the song's lyrical content of climbing hills to Gabriel's debut single with the added subtext of being "lost in memories and the thought of time’s passing." Writing for Pitchfork, Sam Sodomsky thought that the song's arrangement was "beautiful and precise and a little heavy-handed after the drums come in, but it's easy to forgive once you lock into the earnest beauty of the words." James McNair of Mojo characterised "Playing for Time" as "an extremely eloquent, piano-led meditation on life's autumn creeping to winter."

== Personnel ==
- Peter Gabriel – lead and backing vocals, synthesizers
- Tony Levin – bass
- Manu Katché – drums
- Oli Jacobs – synthesizer
- Tom Cawley – piano
- Richard Chappell – rhythm programming
- Katie May – engineering

Orchestra

- Orchestral arrangement: Edward Shearmur
- Violins: Everton Nelson, Ian Humphries, Louisa Fuller, Charles Mutter, Cathy Thompson, Natalia Bonner, Richard George, Marianne Haynes, Martin Burgess, Clare Hayes, Debbie Widdup, and Odile Ollagnon
- Violas: Bruce White, Fiona Bonds, Peter Lale, and Rachel Roberts
- Cellos: Ian Burdge, Chris Worsey, Caroline Dale, William Schofield, Tony Woollard, and Chris Allan
- French horn: David Pyatt, Richard Bissill
- Tenor trombone/Euphonium: Andy Wood
- Tenor trombone: Tracy Holloway
- Bass trombone: Richard Henry
- Tuba: David Powell
- Orchestra conductor: John Metcalfe
- Orchestra leader: Everton Nelson
- Sheet music supervisor: Dave Foster
- Orchestra contractor: Lucy Whalley and Susie Gillis

== Charts ==
Chart performance for "Playing for Time"
Chart (2023)	Peak position
German Downloads (Offizielle Download Top 100)	87
UK Singles Downloads (Official Charts)	83
