= We Do What We're Told (Milgram's 37) =

Song by Peter Gabriel

from the album So
- Released: 1986
- Genre: Progressive rock
- Length: 3:22
- Label: Charisma
- Songwriter: Peter Gabriel
- Producers: Peter Gabriel; Daniel Lanois

"We Do What We're Told (Milgram's 37)" is a song written and recorded by English musician Peter Gabriel. Although Gabriel started performing the song in 1980, it did not appear on a studio album until its inclusion on So six years later.

The song was inspired by the Milgram experiments, which were conducted by the Yale University psychologist Stanley Milgram in 1961. Milgram sought to measure obedience and conformity by determining if a participant would demonstrate a willingness to deliver lethal shocks to an individual at the request of an authority figure. In the 18th variation of the experiment, 37 of the 40 participants provided a subsidiary act in administering what they assumed were 450 volts of electricity to another individual, who unbeknownst to the participant, was played by an actor receiving fake electric shocks. Gabriel dedicated "We Do What We're Told (Milgram's 37)" to those who refused to obey the authority figure's instructions.

== Context ==
Setup of the Milgram Experiment

The Milgram experiments, which were falsely presented to the participants as a memory test, were instead intended to observe the willingness of individuals to perform actions that challenged their moral values and personal conscience. Participants took on the role of the "teacher" in the experiment and asked a series of memory questions to the student, who was situated in a separate room. The teacher was instructed by the "experimenter" to administer an electric shock and increase the voltage each time the student failed to correctly answer the question. The electric voltages ranged from 15 volts to 450 volts; the latter was labeled with a notice reading "Danger: Severe Shock". Unbeknownst to the participants, the learner was played by an actor who received no electric shocks for their incorrect answers.

During the simulations, the experimenter, who was also played by an actor, would counter any objections from the teacher by insisting on the necessity of continuing the experiment. The purpose of this was to determine the willingness of individuals to inflict pain when instructed to do so by an authority figure. Milgram's colleagues believed that only a small percentage of participants would administer the maximum punishment of a 450 volt shock, but the completion rate was higher than they anticipated.

In an interview, Gabriel said the song's subtitle of "Milgram's 37" referred to the first variation of the experiment and claimed that 37 percent of the volunteers refused to obey instructions in this variation. However, the disobedience rate for the first experiment was actually 35 percent. In Milgram's 18th variation of the experiment, the participants did not directly shock the learner and instead assisted a confederate in carrying out this responsibility by reciting the word-pair test to the student. Experiment 18 yielded the highest obedience rate of Milgram's simulations, with 37 of the 40 participants continuing to the very end.

== Background and composition ==
Gabriel took lyrical inspiration from Milgram's book, Obedience to Authority: An Experimental View, which documented the social psychologist's methods and observations from his experiments on obedience in the 1960s. Gabriel wrote the song with the intention of understanding why people do "horrible and barbaric things to each other during situations like wartime." While recounting his impressions of the book to The Bristol Recorder, Gabriel noted how certain participants attempted to rationalise their decisions to inflict pain on other individuals.

At what point will the subject refuse to obey the experimenter?

— Stanley Milgram

A lot of people would absolve their consciences by saying 'this is ridiculous, I'm hurting this person and will not do it'. And there were a whole lot of planned responses from the "authority", one of which was 'It is necessary that this experiment continues'. People would often seem to feel that once they had made a verbal protest it was ok, they'd done their bit, and could now continue. And some of the people were actually getting off on it, actually laughing while they pressed these buttons.

"We Do What We're Told (Milgram's 37)" was originally written and recorded for Gabriel's third self-titled album, but it was ultimately not included. At the time, the song had the working title of "Milgram's 37", although this name was later relegated to the subtitle. In a 1980 interview with Melody Maker, Gabriel said that the song would either be released as a single, appear on a twelve-inch single, or be included on his next album. However, the song was not included on Gabriel's fourth self-titled album despite being considered.

When the So sessions began in 1985, "We Do What We're Told (Milgram's 37)" was the first song that Gabriel worked on. David Rhodes recorded two guitar tracks on a Fender Jazzmaster and used the instrument's wang bar to play half notes and straight quarter notes descending from A to F♯. The original recording included some noises that were omitted from the version found on So, including the sound of a baby crying. Rhodes called this version of the song "very worrying" and described the final mix as comparatively "more optimistic".

Gabriel felt that "We Do What We're Told (Milgram's 37)" was the only song on So that chiefly relied on texture and atmosphere over melodicism. The pulsating effects were created with a Prophet-5 synthesiser and a Fairlight CMI, the latter of which was also used to process Gabriel's vocals.

== Critical reception ==
Tim Holmes of Rolling Stone focused on the thematic elements of the lyrics, saying that they signalled a "note of humble resignation" and represented "a brief sigh at the realization that we are programmed by forces outside our control." Jon Pareles of The New York Times likened the sound of the drums to "a heartbeat heard from the womb."

In its review of the 25th anniversary of So, Uncut labeled "We Do What We're Told (Milgram's 37)" as an "oft-overlooked...Eno-esque miniature that ends just as it starts getting interesting.” While David Buckley of Mojo was lukewarm on So, he singled out praise for "We Do What We're Told (Milgram's 37)", saying that it was the only song on the album that demonstrated Gabriel's "daring past." Daryl Easlea, a Peter Gabriel biographer, characterised the song as the "last link" to Gabriel's material from the early 1980s and compared it to "Lead a Normal Life" from Gabriel's 1980 eponymous release. In his book Every Album, Every Song, Graeme Scarfe described Gabriel's vocal delivery as "catatonic" and said that the lyrics were akin to a mantra.

Peter Hammill was critical of the song, believing that it was ineffective in conveying the message of the source material.

For somebody who knows nothing about Milgram, it just presents another Kafka-esque vision...You want people who know nothing about [the Milgram experiments] to become interested; you want people who do not know something about it to have their perceptions changed in some way, or at least present them with an alternative view. The only reason I bring this up is I do think he gets elements of that into other quests. "Biko", obviously, is an epic stand precisely because it flips from the mundane to the absolute global, and that is what "Milgram's 37" doesn't.

== Live performances ==
The song's first live performance occurred six years before the release of So. Gabriel wanted to incorporate the taped screams and filmed footage from Milgram's experiments during his 1980 performances, but Milgram denied this request. Gabriel recalled that his first phone call with Milgram was "cordial" and learned that some of the social psychologist's students were fans of his music. However, after consulting with his colleagues, Milgram informed Gabriel in a second phone call that "academic research and entertainment aren't happy bedfellows".

In a concert review of Gabriel's 1980 show in Birmingham, John Orme of Melody Maker described the song as a "mechanically striding piece of Pavlovian investigation". On this tour, performances of "We Do What We're Told (Milgram's 37") lacked the final stanza found on So and only contained the lyrics "we do what we're told, told to do". Gabriel occasionally encouraged the audience to sing along to the chorus and noted that "some people got the irony but not everyone."

Gabriel performed "We Do What We're Told" on his Back to Front Tour, which included every song from Gabriel's So album played in sequence using his touring band from 1986–1987. A live recording from one of Gabriel's performances at The O2 Arena also appeared on Back to Front: Live in London, which was released in 2014.

== Personnel ==
- Peter Gabriel – vocals, Fairlight CMI, Prophet-5, piano
- David Rhodes – guitar
- Jerry Marotta – drums
- L. Shankar – violin
