= Don't Give Up (Peter Gabriel and Kate Bush song) =

1986 single by Peter Gabriel and Kate Bush

Single by Peter Gabriel and Kate Bush

from the album So
- B-side: "In Your Eyes" (Special mix), "This Is the Picture" (UK); "Curtains" (US)
- Released: 20 October 1986
- Length: 6:32 (album version); 6:07 (12-inch single edit); 5:40 (7-inch single edit)
- Label: Geffen
- Songwriter: Peter Gabriel
- Producers: Daniel Lanois; Peter Gabriel

Peter Gabriel singles chronology
"Sledgehammer" (1986)	"Don't Give Up" (1986)	"In Your Eyes" (1986)

Kate Bush singles chronology
"The Big Sky" (1986)	"Don't Give Up" (1986)	"Experiment IV" (1986)

Music video
- "Don't Give Up" on YouTube

"Don't Give Up" is a song written by the English rock musician Peter Gabriel and recorded as a duet with English singer Kate Bush for Gabriel's fifth solo studio album, So (1986). An edited version was released by Geffen Records as the second single from the album in the UK on 20 October 1986 and as the fourth single in the US in March 1987. It was produced by Gabriel with Daniel Lanois and spent 11 weeks on the UK singles chart in 1986, peaking at number nine. Two different music videos were created for the song, one directed by Godley & Creme and the other by Jim Blashfield. In 1987 the song won an Ivor Novello Award for Best Song Musically and Lyrically.

== Background ==
The song was inspired by the Depression-era photographs of Dorothea Lange, showing poverty-stricken Americans in Dust Bowl conditions. Gabriel saw Lange's images in a book entitled In This Proud Land (1973) and felt that a song on this topic was appropriate. He also cited unemployment in the United Kingdom under the premiership of Margaret Thatcher as further inspiration.

Gabriel composed lyrics about a man whose unemployment causes stress in his domestic relationship. He had watched a TV program about the consequences of unemployment on family life, and said that it "played into my own problems at that time. I think a combination of that and domestic difficulties." The verses, sung by Gabriel, describe the man's feelings of isolation, loneliness and despair; the choruses, sung by Bush, offer words of hope and encouragement. The title was something that Gabriel's former wife, Jill, would say when he was experiencing emotional difficulties. "When he gets into very deep depressions, I am always saying don't give up. I think the song is very much about us."

== Recording ==
Initial ideas for the song date back to 1981 during the recording of his fourth self-titled solo album, which took place at Ashcombe House, Somerset. Gabriel built the song around a tom-tom pattern with a three-against-four polyrhythm that he programmed onto a drum machine. He tuned the programmed tom-toms to different pitches with the intention of having Tony Levin emulate the part on the bass guitar. Halfway through recording, Levin placed a nappy behind his strings to dampen the sound and achieve a softer tone. Levin had packed the nappies in his gig bag for his two-month-old daughter because he mistakenly thought that the products were not sold in the UK.

For the drums, Gabriel told Manu Katché to only use a bass drum, hi-hat, and a cymbal. Katché suggested a 4/4 feel rather than interpreting the song in triple metre, which Gabriel agreed with. Richard Tee contributed piano in the song's bridge to infuse a gospel feel into the section. Gabriel attempted a few variations of the ending section, but eventually settled on an arrangement that he was satisfied with.

Gabriel developed the "don't give up" lyric and the verses early on, although he did not finalize the chorus until a few months after the melody was solidified. He did not conceive the song as a duet and originally sang all of the choruses himself, but later said that "the story would work better with a man–woman relationship." The initial demos of "Don't Give Up" were around seven minutes in duration, although Gabriel later decided to edit the song down.

I always over-record, because again it's a classic situation in the studio. The band suddenly starts rehearsing at the end of the song and this sort of magic groove starts coming—and then the tape runs out. So I always make sure we've got five minutes spare, so if something does happen, if the band takes off, then you can get it. And then perhaps you'll come back and try to pull some of that energy into the earlier sections.

— Peter Gabriel

Gabriel wrote the song from a reference point of American roots music and approached country singer Dolly Parton to sing it with him. However, Parton turned it down, so his friend Kate Bush took her place. Gabriel said that Bush was originally nervous about participating, but delivered an "excellent" vocal take on her second attempt. David Stallbaumer, who served as an assistant engineer for the sessions, thought that Bush's contributions improved the song "almost instantaneously".

== Music videos ==
Two music videos were created for the song. The first, by Godley & Creme, is a single take of Gabriel and Bush, as they sing, in an embrace, while the sun behind them enters a total eclipse and re-emerges. Of the shoot, Gabriel remarked, "There are worse ways of earning a living." According to Gabriel, Godley & Creme suggested the idea of Bush and Gabriel holding each other for the entire video. Before the filming of the music video, Gabriel contacted his wife Jill to secure her support for the concept.

I didn't fight their idea, but I thought that five minutes of groping Kate in front of the world was perhaps not the best thing for a dodgy marriage. At the time I felt I needed... a blessing. Anyway, Jill was great about it. She said something like, "Of course, darling, you go right ahead," and then the video hurt her every time she saw it.

The video was featured in the final broadcast of the channel Europa TV in November 1986. A second video, directed by Jim Blashfield and produced by Melissa Marsland in 1988, features the singers' faces superimposed over film of a town and its people in disrepair.

== Critical reception ==
In his review for Music Week, Jerry Smith wrote that "Don't Give Up" was "arguably the best track on Gabriel's latest album, So, with earthy vocal strikingly counterpointed by Kate Bush's wonderful voice". Rolling Stone contrasted Gabriel's "mournful" vocal delivery with Bush's "voice of life" that "penetrates the gloom". Billboard said that Gabriel and Bush created a "mood of hopeful melancholy" with their "somberly thoughtful" and "otherworldly" vocals. Jon Young of Musician magazine characterised "Don't Give Up" as "a heart-rending ballad that counterpoints his simple, moving performance with an absurdly mannered display by guest Kate Bush", adding that the song demonstrated Gabriel's "conflicting impulses".

== Legacy ==
In a 2014 interview, Elton John attributed his sobriety to the song, in particular the lyric from Bush, "Rest your head. You worry too much. It's going to be all right. When times get rough you can fall back on us. Don't give up." He states, "she [Bush] played a big part in my rebirth. That record helped me so much."

Similarly, actor Matthew Perry (who struggled with substance and alcohol addiction) was enamored with the song; it was played at his funeral in November 2023 and was referenced in signed copies of his autobiography Friends, Lovers, and the Big Terrible Thing, which was released a year before his death. Of the song, Perry said in an interview, "It was so cool and I love that. I've been writing it when I sign the book. I always put 'Don't give up' because you shouldn't give up." Gabriel said in a 1989 interview that multiple people had approached him to say that "Don't Give Up" "came at a very good time in their life" and recalled an instance where "a well-known American comedian" told him that the song saved his life.

== Live performances ==
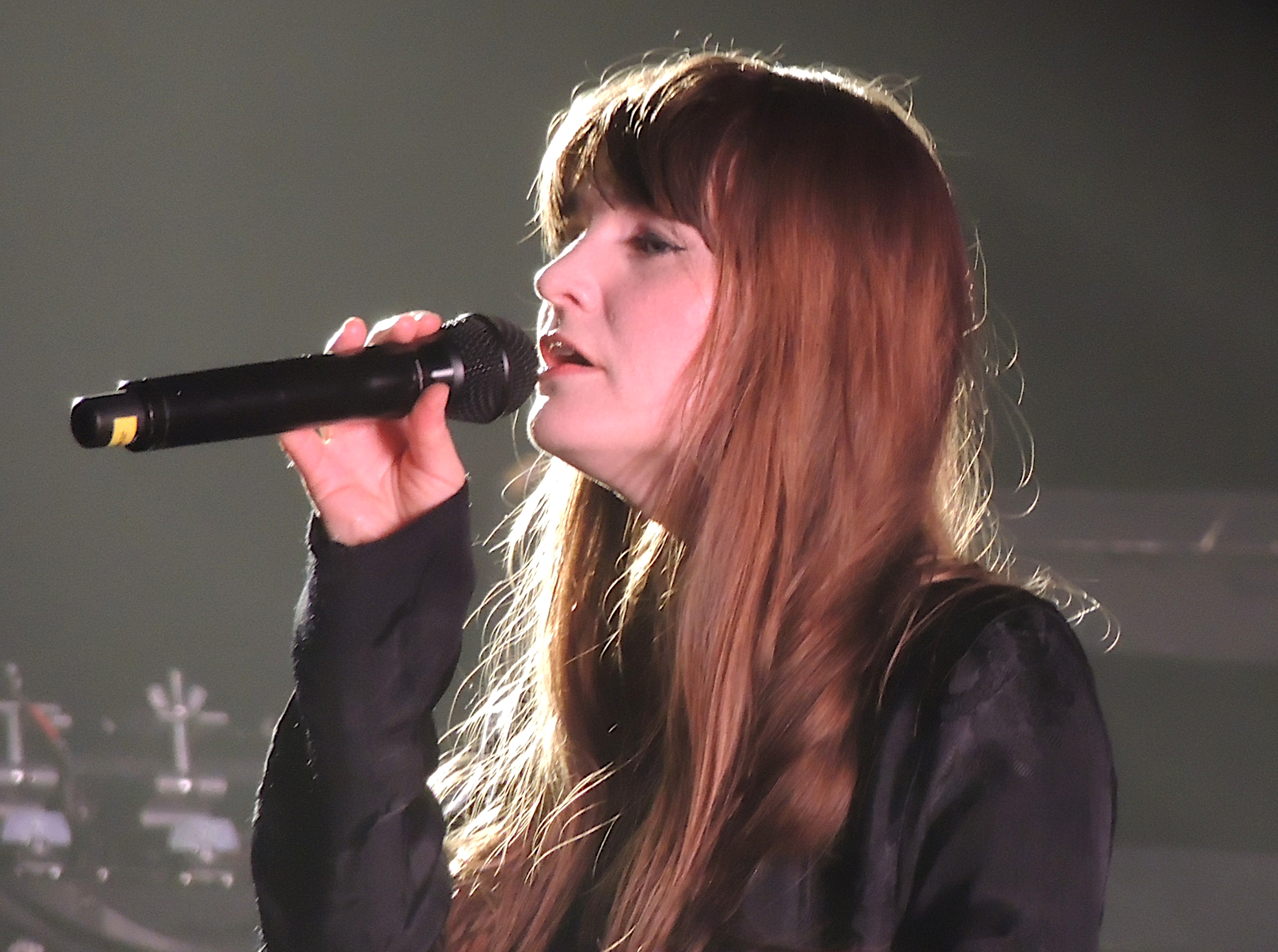
Jennie Abrahamson performing Don't Give Up at Peter Gabriel's Back to Front Tour 2014 at Festhalle in Frankfurt, Germany

The song was included in Gabriel's concert film Live in Athens 1987 where he sang both parts. During the An Embrace Of Hope concert 1990 in Chile, he performed the song with Sinéad O'Connor. On the Secret World Tour, Paula Cole sang the song as a duet with Gabriel. Both the CD and DVD editions of Secret World Live included a live rendition of the song. Manu Katché prepared the programmed drums with a Roland Octapad and an Akai MPC for live renditions of from the Secret World Live Tour. He also triggered some sampled sounds using contact microphones placed on his tom-toms.

An all-orchestral recording featuring Ane Brun was released on Gabriel's ninth studio album New Blood (2011). During Back to Front Tour from 2012 to 2014, Gabriel performed the Song live with singer Jennie Abrahamson. During i/o The Tour in 2023, Gabriel performed the song live with cellist/pianist/singer Ayanna Witter-Johnson.

== Track listing ==
All tracks are written by Peter Gabriel.

12-inch (UK)
No.	Title	Length
1.	"Don't Give Up"	6:30
2.	"In Your Eyes" (Special mix)	7:15
3.	"This Is the Picture (Excellent Birds)"	4:16

12-inch (US)
No.	Title	Length
1.	"Don't Give Up" (LP version)	6:30
2.	"Don't Give Up" (edit)	5:26
3.	"Curtains"	3:35

Limited edition 7-inch poster sleeve
No.	Title	Length
1.	"Don't Give Up"	5:40
2.	"In Your Eyes" (Special mix)	7:15

== Personnel ==
- Manu Katché – drums, percussion
- Tony Levin – bass guitar
- David Rhodes – guitars
- Richard Tee – piano
- Peter Gabriel – vocals, CMI, Prophet, Linn, piano
- Simon Clark – chorus CS-80
- Kate Bush – guest vocals
- Kevin Killen - engineer and mixer

== Charts ==
=== Weekly charts ===
Chart (1986–1987)	Peak position
Australia (Kent Music Report)	5
Belgium (Top 30)	7
Belgium (Ultratop 50 Flanders)	9
Canada Top Singles (RPM)	40
Europe (European Hot 100 Singles)	10
Ireland (IRMA)	4
Luxembourg (Radio Luxembourg)	4
Netherlands (Dutch Top 40)	4
Netherlands (Single Top 100)	5
New Zealand (Recorded Music NZ)	16
Spain (AFYVE)	13
UK Singles (Official Charts)	9
US Billboard Hot 100	72
West Germany (GfK)	27

Chart (2022)	Peak position
UK Downloads (OCC)	48
UK Sales (OCC)	49

=== Year-end charts ===
Chart (1987)	Position
Australia (Kent Music Report)	55
Belgium (Ultratop 50 Flanders)	84
Netherlands (Dutch Top 40)	70

== Certifications ==
Certifications for Don't Give Up
Region	Certification	Certified units/sales
New Zealand (RMNZ)	Gold	15,000^{‡}
^{‡} Sales+streaming figures based on certification alone.

== Other versions ==
=== Willie Nelson and Sinéad O'Connor version ===
"Don't Give Up"
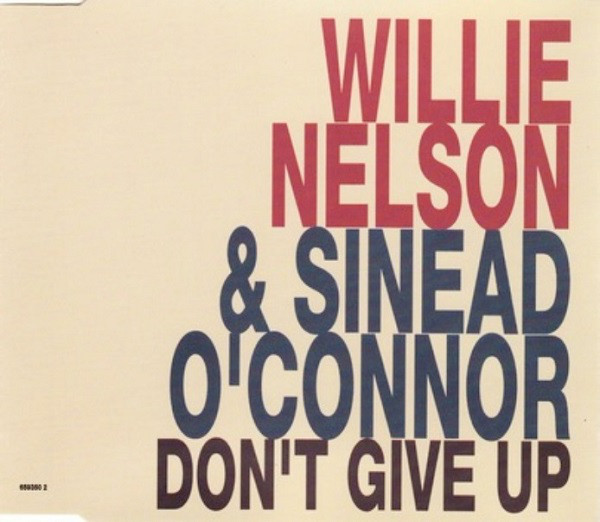

Single by Willie Nelson and Sinéad O'Connor
- Released: 1992
- Genre: Country
- Length: 4:50
- Songwriter: Peter Gabriel
- Producer: Don Was

Sinéad O'Connor singles chronology
"Success Has Made a Failure of Our Home" (1992)	"Don't Give Up" (1992)	"You Made Me the Thief of Your Heart" (1994)

Music video
- "Don't Give Up" on YouTube

The song was covered as a duet between American musician Willie Nelson and Irish singer Sinéad O'Connor in 1993. The single is included on Nelson's Across the Borderline studio album, produced by Don Was. O'Connor sang Kate Bush's parts in the song. In an interview with Los Angeles Times, Nelson talked about the duet and how it was made. He said:

There was another lady, Dolly Parton, who was supposed to do that part, but she ended up being unavailable. At the rehearsal for the [Bob] Dylan tribute show in New York, Don [Was] suggested Sinead. I'd heard about the controversy with the Pope, but I'd never heard her sing. Don said, 'She's excellent. It turned out that she and Peter Gabriel were friends and she already knew the song. At the concert, she was booed for the controversy. I asked her, 'Are you sure you still feel like coming in to sing tomorrow?' She said, 'Yes, I'll be there.' She came in the next day and sang her off.

A music video was also produced to accompany the song, featuring both singers. It has a sepia tone. It was reported that funds raised by sales of the single were in excess of $300,000.

==== Critical reception ====
Martin Monkman from AllMusic named the duet the "most stunning song" on Nelson's album, and "a brilliant piece of casting." He added, "Nelson and O'Connor's rendition is quietly triumphant and every bit as powerful as Gabriel and Bush's original." John Davis from Austin American-Statesman wrote, "The teaming of his crisp, autumnal baritone with the ethereal, spun-steel counterpoint of O'Connor's voice on Gabriel's paean of hope, 'Don't Give Up', is little short of haunting. It is arguably the album's most arresting interlude, as well as Nelson's most accomplished pass ever at a modern pop song. And it nearly did not happen at all." Bill DeYoung from Gainesville Sun described the duet as "heartfelt". Paul Freeman from Los Angeles Times called it "a striking duet". Pan-European magazine Music & Media remarked that Nelson's version "makes a rodeo queen out of his duet partner". Roger Morton from NME felt the pair's version "is quite dignified enough to stand up on its own. It's an understated rendering which, a few country twangs aside, leaves the interaction between Nelson's grizzled tones and Sinead's frail quavers to do the work." An editor from Pittsburgh Post-Gazette wrote that Nelson and O'Connor "make an odd but effective couple". David Zimmerman from USA Today named it a "wonderful stop" on the album, noting its "hope-and-despair seesaw".

==== Track listing ====
1. "Don't Give Up"
2. "Don't Give Up" (instrumental)

==== Charts ====
Chart (1993)	Peak position
Australia (ARIA)	121

=== Alicia Keys and Bono version ===
"Don't Give Up (Africa)"
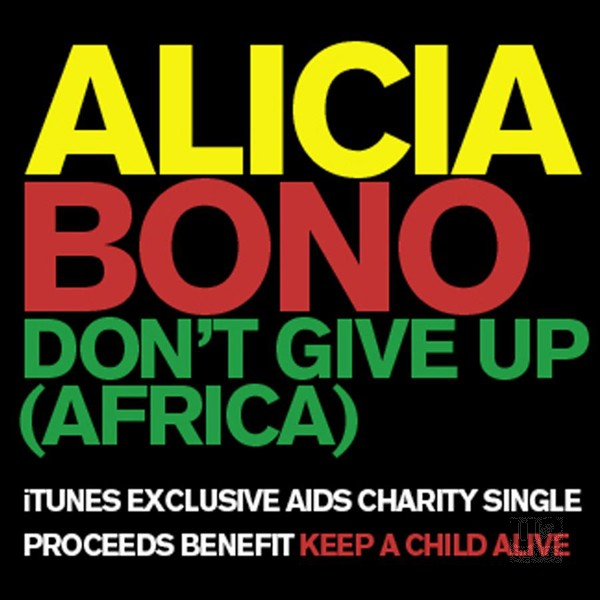

Single by Alicia Keys and Bono
- Released: 6 December 2005
- Studio: Oven Studios (Long Island, NY)
- Genre: R&B
- Length: 4:27
- Songwriter: Peter Gabriel
- Producers: Alicia Keys; Steve Lillywhite

Alicia Keys singles chronology
"Unbreakable" (2005)	"Don't Give Up (Africa)" (2005)	"Ghetto Story" (2006)

"Don't Give Up" was recorded by American recording artist Alicia Keys and Irish musician Bono. Retitled "Don't Give Up (Africa)", the song was produced by Keys and Steve Lillywhite. On 6 December 2005, the song was released as a single exclusively on iTunes and a ringtone version was released by Cingular Wireless. The proceeds of the release went to the charity Keep a Child Alive, for which Keys is a spokesperson. Keys commented that "I love this song. And I love Bono. I really respect what he has done for Africa and how he has used his fame to do good in the world. I hope I can do half as much in my life". Keys and Bono performed the song live at Keys' charity event the Black Ball, which raises money for the organization Keep A Child Alive. They performed the song also on The Oprah Winfrey Show in October 2006.

The recording of the song took place at the Oven Studios on Long Island. Keys spoke of the recording session at the studio with Bono and Steve Lillywhite:

We were playing them the backing tracks and I don't know if I started singing, or he did, but something started happening and we tracked it right here on the spot, that's it, we're done. There was a crowd in here, everybody came in from the other room because they could tell there was something going on in here.

==== Track listing ====
Digital download
No.	Title	Length
1.	"Don't Give Up (Africa)"	4:27

==== Charts ====
Chart (2005)	Peak position
US Billboard Pop 100	79

=== Jann Klose and Annie Haslam version ===
Jann Klose and Renaissance vocalist and painter Annie Haslam released their version, produced by Rave Tesar in June 2017. The recording features Jann Klose on acoustic guitar and lead vocals, Annie Haslam on lead vocals, John Arbo on upright bass, Rob Mitzner on cajon and Rave Tesar on keys. Proceeds from the sale of the recording benefit Desmond Tutu's TutuDesk foundation.

=== Shannon Noll and Natalie Bassingthwaighte version ===
"Don't Give Up"

Single by Shannon Noll and Natalie Bassingthwaighte

from the album Home: Songs of Hope & Journey
- Released: 9 December 2006
- Length: 4:39
- Label: Sony BMG
- Songwriter: Peter Gabriel
- Producer: Michael Mugisha

Shannon Noll singles chronology
"Lonely" (2006)	"Don't Give Up" (2006)	"Loud" (2007)

Natalie Bassingthwaighte singles chronology
"Don't Give Up" (2006)	"Alive" (2008)

A cover version was recorded by Australian artist Shannon Noll and former Rogue Traders frontwoman Natalie Bassingthwaighte. It was produced by Michael Mugisha, who also produced hits for Jessica Mauboy and Big Brovaz. It was released as a charity single for the depression organisation Beyond Blue. It was the most-added song to Australian radio during its first week. It made its debut at number seven on the Australian Singles Chart, and, during its second week, climbed to number two with a platinum certification. The music video features Noll and Bassingthwaighte in the studio recording the single.

==== Charts ====
Weekly charts

Chart (2006–2007)	Peak position
Australia (ARIA)	2

Year-end charts

Chart (2006)	Position
Australia (ARIA)	51

Chart (2007)	Position
Australia (ARIA)	54

==== Certifications ====
Region	Certification	Certified units/sales
Australia (ARIA)	Platinum	70,000^{^}
^{^} Shipments figures based on certification alone.

== Bibliography ==
- Scott, George (2012). Classic Albums: So. Classic Albums. United Kingdom: Eagle Rock Entertainment and Peter Gabriel Records Lh.
