= No Self Control (Peter Gabriel song) =

Single by Peter Gabriel

from the album Peter Gabriel (Melt)
- B-side: "Lead a Normal Life"
- Released: 25 April 1980
- Recorded: 1979
- Genre: Art rock; electro-soul
- Length: 3:55
- Label: Charisma
- Songwriter: Peter Gabriel
- Producer: Steve Lillywhite

Peter Gabriel singles chronology
"Games Without Frontiers" (1980)	"No Self Control" (1980)	"Biko" (1980)

"No Self Control" is a song written and performed by the English rock musician Peter Gabriel. When writing the song, Gabriel took inspiration from minimalist music composers, particularly the work of Steve Reich. During the recording and mixing process, Hugh Padgham and Steve Lillywhite worked with Gabriel to pare back the instrumentation, resulting in a sparser feel.

In April 1980, "No Self Control" was released in the United Kingdom as the second single from Gabriel's third self-titled studio album, where it peaked at number 33. The first 30,000 copies of the single were distributed in picture sleeves. Gabriel has since performed the song live on several concert tours.

== Background ==
The song was inspired by Steve Reich's composition Music for 18 Musicians (1976). "Steve Reich had done this wonderful record called Music for Eighteen Musicians, which involved marimbas and I think, of all the systems composers, his work had a lot of textures and colours and grooves to them that I really responded to. So I tried to involve elements of that in the work." Gabriel programmed some patterns on a PAiA drum machine to develop some rhythmic ideas.

Early versions of the song included full instrumentation, which was later scaled back during the mixing stage of the recording process. Hugh Padgham, who served as the engineer for the recording sessions, later compared this modus operandi to how he mixed "King of Pain" by the Police, where the content on the multitrack tape bore little resemblance to the final product. Steve Lillywhite, who produced the song, assembled the song in a piecemeal process with Padgham, 20–30 seconds at a time. Padgham was situated at the back of the control room and spliced each segment of "No Self Control" together without listening back to his edits; Lillywhite explained that he trusted Padgham's judgement and refrained from listening to the full song until their work was complete.

I remember we spent the whole night doing the mix. For the big playback at the end, we brought people in from outside because we knew we had something great. That was the song everyone loved, loved, loved at the time.

— Steve Lillywhite

The vocal effects in the intro were created with a transistor radio sold at RadioShack. The device, which consisted of a small speaker, a nine-volt battery, a volume control and an input jack, was dubbed "the $9.95" by Gabriel's band as Larry Fast had purchased the transistor radio for that price. Fast connected "the $9.95" to an output of another device and processed Gabriel's vocals through a Moog filter. After Gabriel expressed his approval of the sound, Fast suggested that they connect "the $9.95" to the mixing board, but this was deemed unsatisfactory. Lillywhite explained that the analog distortion from the device's speaker was superior to its sound when connected to the mixing board, which he said sounded "average and boring." As such, Gabriel instead held the speaker up to his mouth and made wah-wah noises, which were captured with a microphone and later processed. Lillywhite described the vocal effect as "a poor man's Peter Frampton."

Morris Pert supplied the song's marimba work, which underpins the composition. Wordless backing vocals from Gabriel and Kate Bush were introduced to the song following the introduction of Pert's marimba ostinato. The marimba playing, which author Durrell Bowman described as "rhythmically insistent" and "minimalist", drops out at the song's more rock–oriented bridge, which includes instrumentation of electric guitar, bass, and drums, the latter of which was provided by Phil Collins. David Rhodes played his guitar parts on a Fender Jazzmaster through a Eurotech Black Box Fuzz Module.

== Live performances ==
Prior to being recorded for Gabriel's 1980 studio album, the song was performed live under the working title "I Don't Know How to Stop". Later live performances, such as on Plays Live (1983), were slower and more subdued than the studio recording. Gabriel and his China 1984 touring band performed "No Self Control" on BBC One's Top of the Pops in May 1980. Gabriel later played the song on his 1986–1987 This Way Up tour. During these performances, Gabriel would roll away from two lighting arms that descended upon him.

On his 2012–2014 Back to Front Tour, Gabriel played the entirety of his fifth studio album So (1986) with members of his This Way Up touring band. He augmented the setlist with additional songs in his discography, including "No Self Control". Similar to his This Way Up tour, a series of lighting arms hovered and swung over Gabriel during one part of the song, although he remained standing for this portion. For the Rock Paper Scissors Tour, which was a series of joint performances with Gabriel and Sting in 2016, "No Self Control" was placed as the third song of the set. Whereas the first two songs of the set were played without each other's company, Sting joined Gabriel onstage for "No Self Control" and sang one of the verses.

== Critical reception ==
Writing for Sounds, Hugh Fielder noted Gabriel's "uninhibited" vocal delivery on "No Self Control" and expressed surprise that the song had reached the top 50 in the UK. Nick Kent of NME praised the song as a "masterpiece of conceit and implementation" and wrote that it was "a startling piece of music, as close to an aural Taxi Driver as one can get." He placed further attention on the song's arrangement that "follows Gabriel's feverish maneuvers stroke for stroke" with its reliance on both synthesisers and "primitive" mallet percussion that build into a "hysterical mass chorus of the song's title."

In his retrospective review of Peter Gabriel's third eponymous release, Chris Roberts of The Quietus described the song as a "beautifully structured and subtly aggressive" song with a "compelling construct of synths and riffs." Graeme Thompson of Uncut magazine called "No Self Control" one of the album's "terrific songs" that was "greatly enhanced by a vaulting spirit of adventure."

== Track listing ==
=== 7" UK single (1980) ===
1. "No Self Control" – 3:47
2. "Lead a Normal Life" – 4:10

== Personnel ==
- Peter Gabriel – lead vocals; piano
- Kate Bush – backing vocals
- David Rhodes – guitar
- Robert Fripp – guitar
- John Giblin – bass guitar
- Dick Morrissey – saxophone
- Larry Fast – synthesizers; processing
- Phil Collins – drums
- Morris Pert – percussion

== Charts ==
Chart (1980)	Peak position
Luxembourg (Radio Luxembourg)	16
UK Official Singles Chart	33
