= So (album) =

- Original UK vinyl cover

Studio album by Peter Gabriel
- Released: 19 May 1986
- Recorded: February 1985 – February 1986
- Studios: Ashcombe House (Swainswick); Power Station (New York City); Polygram (Rio de Janeiro)
- Genres: Art pop; art rock; progressive pop; worldbeat
- Length: 41:56 (vinyl); 46:21 (CD)
- Labels: Charisma; Virgin; Geffen
- Producers: Peter Gabriel; Daniel Lanois

Peter Gabriel chronology
Birdy (1985)	So (1986)	Passion (1989)

Peter Gabriel studio album chronology
Peter Gabriel (1982)	So (1986)	Us (1992)

Singles from So
- 1. "Sledgehammer" Released: April 1986 (Note: All of these release dates pertain to their release in the United Kingdom, except "In Your Eyes", which was released in the US in August 1986.); 2. "In Your Eyes" Released: August 1986 (US); 3. "Don't Give Up" Released: October 1986; 4. "Big Time" Released: March 1987; 5. "Red Rain" Released: June 1987

So is the fifth studio album by the English singer-songwriter Peter Gabriel, released on 19 May 1986 by Charisma Records, Virgin Records and Geffen Records. After working on the soundtrack to the film Birdy (1984), producer Daniel Lanois was invited to remain at Gabriel's Somerset home during 1985 to work on his next solo project. Initial sessions for So consisted of Gabriel, Lanois and guitarist David Rhodes, although these grew to include a number of percussionists.

Although Gabriel continued to use the pioneering Fairlight CMI digital sampling synthesizer, songs from these sessions were less experimental than his previous material. Nevertheless, Gabriel drew on various musical influences, fusing pop, soul, and art rock with elements of traditional world music, particularly African and Brazilian styles. It is Gabriel's first non-eponymous album, So representing an "anti-title" that resulted from label pressure to "properly" market his music. Gabriel toured So on the This Way Up tour (1986–1987), with some songs performed at human rights and charity concerts during this period.

Often considered his best and most accessible album, So was an immediate commercial success and transformed Gabriel from a cult artist into a mainstream star, becoming his best-selling solo release. It has been certified fivefold platinum by the Recording Industry Association of America and triple platinum by the British Phonographic Industry. The album's lead single, "Sledgehammer", was promoted with an innovative animated music video and achieved particular success, reaching number one on the Billboard Hot 100 and subsequently winning a record of nine MTV Video Music Awards. It was followed by four further singles, "Don't Give Up" (a duet with Kate Bush), "Big Time", "In Your Eyes", and "Red Rain".

The album received positive reviews from most critics, who praised its songwriting, melodies and fusion of genres, although some retrospective reviews have criticised its overt commercialism and 1980s production sounds. So was nominated for the Grammy Award for Album of the Year in 1987 but lost to Paul Simon's Graceland. It has appeared in lists of the best albums of the 1980s, and Rolling Stone included the album in their 2003 and 2020 editions of the 500 Greatest Albums of All Time. In 2000 it was voted number 82 in Colin Larkin's All Time Top 1000 Albums. So was remastered in 2002, partially re-recorded for Gabriel's 2011 orchestral project New Blood and issued as a box set in 2012.

== Recording ==
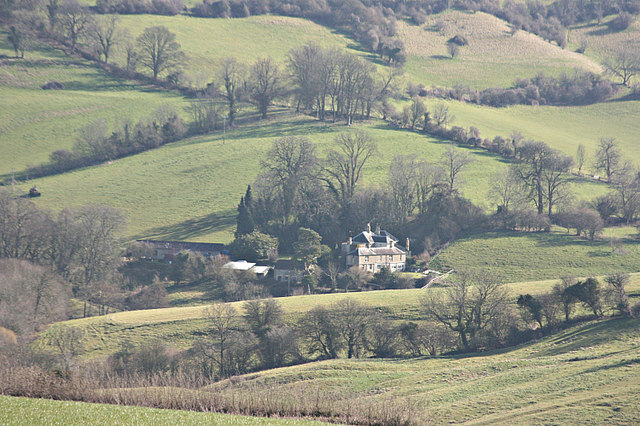
Songs for the album were written and prepared in 1985 at Gabriel's home Ashcombe House, an estate to the north-east of Bath

Since 1978, Gabriel had composed his music at Ashcombe House, including his album Security (1982) and the Birdy soundtrack (1984). He had an inexpensive studio in the adjacent barn consisting of two rooms, one where Gabriel would produce his vocals and work on lyrics, and another where the music would be assembled. Preparing for So, Gabriel considered Bill Laswell and Chic's Nile Rodgers as potential producers. He eventually asked his Birdy collaborator Daniel Lanois to stay at Ashcombe and work with him further.

Work on the album began in earnest in February 1985, with "We Do What We're Told (Milgram's 37)" as the first song; the first six months would be spent on writing and developing song sketches. The songs were usually recorded in the studio with Gabriel, Lanois and guitarist David Rhodes playing together to a drum machine, based on an idea or chord structure Gabriel had. Lanois recalled they had "a nice starting point [as] in that kind of scenario, it's not a good idea to have a lot of people around because you get nervous that you're wasting other people's time". Consequently, there was a relaxed atmosphere surrounding these sessions and the trio would jokingly refer to themselves as the "Three Stooges". This also involved the wearing of construction site hard hats as they had a "turning up for work humour".

Once they had the songs' foundations, bass and drums were overdubbed - primarily with Tony Levin, and Manu Katché, respectively. According to Lanois, he usually liked "to capture as much of the live playing as possible in any session, but these [sessions] were really the reverse... It was like overdubbing the rhythm section on top of a demo. That was the spirit of the record." (Note: As Katché confirmed, "Sledgehammer" was recorded as a full band with Levin, Rhodes and Gabriel, with other songs having drums added late in the process.) During the recording, Gabriel would occasionally invite Levin, Rhodes and Katché back to re-do their parts as the songs continued to take shape and evolve.

The studio's basic equipment consisted of an SSL console and two analog Studer A80 24-track machines - one stock and one modified with custom audio cards. (Note: Killen notes that by September 1985, all of the material was on a Mitsubishi 32-track digital audio tape due to synchronisation issues between the two Studers.) To record vocals, a Neumann U47 tube microphone and a Decca compressor were used without equalization. All of So's songs were made in a similar format. Gabriel would record demo parts on a modified "B machine" - using mainly a Yamaha piano and Prophet-5 over a Linn 9000 drum beat - and play this to the band. During takes, the band would listen to the B machine through headphones and record their parts onto the "A machine"; parts of Gabriel's demo would also be transferred to the A machine at this stage. Subsequent takes of the song were then put onto the B machine in order for the band to hear what they had played with the demo, as well as the song's new and old takes.

Other equipment included the "groundbreaking" Fairlight CMI synthesizer, which Gabriel said in an interview for Billboard meant "more human imagination is involved". He added, "the creative decision-making process has become more important than technique. You have a wider range of tools, a wider range of decisions". Although remaining continually inspired to produce new music, he often struggled to write lyrics and would procrastinate. His proclivity to being dissatisfied with them required Killen to isolate certain vocal performances as the master track, in order to keep other tracks available so new lyrics could be edited in. Lanois took adverse measures to encourage his writing, such as destroying his much-used telephone in the nearby woods and, on one occasion, nailed the studio door shut to lock him inside.

Towards the end of recording, Gabriel became "obsessed" with the track listing and created an audio cassette of all the song's beginnings and ends to hear how the sounds blended together. He wanted to have "In Your Eyes" as the final track, but its prominent bassline meant it had to be placed earlier on the vinyl edition as there is more room for the stylus to vibrate. With later CD releases, this restriction was removed and the track was placed at the end of the album. So was completed in February 1986 and cost £200,000 to make. It was overdubbed at Power Station Studios in New York (as well as all horn section parts having been recorded there), despite Gabriel considering sending it via a computer-telephone set up, reasoning, "that's a lot of information to send via phone. Isn't it amazing though? You can send a song idea around the world to musicians then beam parts back by satellite". It was mastered by Ian Cooper in mid-February 1986 at London's Townhouse Studios.

== Composition ==
So has been described as Gabriel's most commercially accessible and least experimental album, one that features pop songs and incorporates art pop and progressive pop throughout. Like his previous albums, its basis is in art rock, although on So, Gabriel develops an increased focus on melody and combines this with elements of soul and African music. "With a song like (the previous album's) 'The Rhythm of the Heat' or 'The Family and the Fishing Net', if I were to strum that along on a guitar or piano, the song might not work very well ... whereas more of the things on this album do work just as lyric, melody and chords in a more traditional sense." Gabriel began with around 30 compositional ideas and 20 recorded tracks, which he later winnowed down to twelve songs that were "within finishing distance".

The songs are highly influenced by traditional world music, particularly African and Brazilian music, with Gabriel incorporating rhythms and drum beats from these regions. In a 2011 interview for Uncut, Gabriel said, "I'd had my fill of instrumental experimenting for a while, and I wanted to write proper pop songs, albeit on my own terms." Jon Pareles of The New York Times notes that Gabriel "doesn't just add on African drums or Indian violin to ordinary songs; they are part of the foundation." Chris Roberts of Classic Rock also notes that the album "[takes] the Fairlight synth and [adds] a palatable dash of world music to art pop." Daniel Lanois' production was noted as textured, replete with ambient details and "immaculate warmth giving each note room to breathe, its textures lavish (in the preferred style of the time) without being sterile".

=== Side one ===
"Sledgehammer"
Opening with the shakuhachi bamboo flute, Gabriel uses a prominent horn section inspired by the music of American soul singer Otis Redding. Wayne Jackson, who toured with Redding in the 1960s, plays the horn on the track.

Gabriel wanted the album to "crash open at the front". Despite disliking "metal" percussion instruments, he was persuaded by Lanois to allow the Police's Stewart Copeland to play cymbals and hi-hat on its opener, "Red Rain". Gabriel sings – in his upper register, with a throaty, gravelly texture – of a destructive world with social problems such as torture and kidnapping. Its concept originated from a dream in which he envisaged the parting of a vast, red sea and human-like glass bottles filling up with blood. It was also intended to continue the story of Mozo, a recurring character on Gabriel's first and second albums.

"Sledgehammer" was the final track to be conceived. Most of Gabriel's band had packed away their equipment and were ready to leave the studio, but he asked them to reassemble to quickly run through a song he had an idea for. "Sledgehammer" was partially inspired by the music of Otis Redding, and Gabriel sought out Wayne Jackson, whom Gabriel had seen on tour with Redding in the 1960s, to record horns for the track. Opened by a shakuhachi bamboo flute, its beat is dominated by brass instruments, particularly Jackson's horn, and features lyrics abundant with sexual euphemisms. (Note: When So was overdubbed at Power Station Studio, New York, the German electronic band Kraftwerk were finishing Electric Café (1986) and "Sledgehammer" was played to them. David Buckley, a Kraftwerk biographer, wrote, "they were knocked back by how fantastic it sounded. They felt their record was puny sonically by comparison, even though it's a completely different genre of music".) Manu Katché's drums were recorded in one take as he believed any subsequent version would be inferior to his original interpretation of the music.

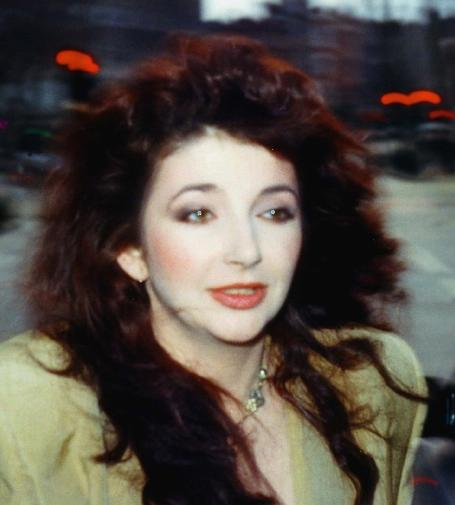
"Don't Give Up" is a duet with Kate Bush.

So's most political statement, "Don't Give Up", was fuelled by Gabriel's discontent with rising unemployment during Margaret Thatcher's premiership, and by Dorothea Lange's photograph "Migrant Mother". The track began as a Linn drum machine pattern of slow, low-pitched tom-tom drums that Gabriel made, and Lanois believed could serve as the centrepiece of a song. Tony Levin added bass to create a more harmonious sound, and during the second half of the track, put a nappy behind his bass strings to dampen the sound. Gabriel ensured the song, which follows a narrative of an unemployed man and his lover, was written as a conversational piece. He initially sought Dolly Parton to portray the woman; although Parton declined, his friend Kate Bush agreed to feature. Bush serves as the song's respondent, she assumes a comforting role and with delicate vocals, sings lines such as "Rest your head/ you worry too much".

The album's first side culminates with "That Voice Again", in which Gabriel explores the concept of conscience, examining the "parental voice in our heads that either helps or defeats us". Co-written with David Rhodes, who plays guitar over Katché and Levin's input, the song was written after Gabriel's initial discussions with Martin Scorsese about scoring The Last Temptation of Christ (1988). (Note: Gabriel eventually agreed to score the film and released Passion (1989) to acclaim, winning a Grammy Award for Best New Age Album at the 1990 ceremony. Passion is sometimes titled Passion: Music for The Last Temptation of Christ. Gabriel has said this is due to "legal barriers".)

=== Side two ===
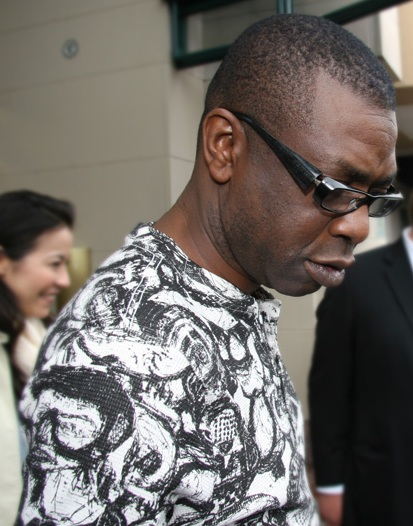
"In Your Eyes" features Wolof vocals by Youssou N'Dour.

"In Your Eyes" was inspired by the Sagrada Família and its architect Antoni Gaudí, Gabriel sings over a drumbeat of only feeling complete in the eyes of his lover. The track features vocal contributions from the Senegalese musician Youssou N'Dour, who sang the song in his native Wolof.

Gabriel became interested in the late American poet Anne Sexton after reading the anthology To Bedlam and Part Way Back. He dedicated So's sixth track to her, calling it "Mercy Street" after "45 Mercy Street", a poem released in another posthumous collection. "Mercy Street" is set to one of several Forró-inspired percussion compositions that Gabriel recorded in Rio de Janeiro. When these compositions were unearthed in the studio, they were accidentally played back ten per cent slower than the original recording, giving them a grainy quality that Gabriel and Lanois thought highlighted the cymbal and guitars. It features two harmonious Gabriel vocals; one a shadow vocal an octave below the main vocal. Intended to give a sensual, haunting effect, this was hard to capture except when Gabriel first woke up.

The dance song "Big Time" has funk influences and is built on a "percussive bass sound". Its lyrics satirise the yuppie culture of the 1980s, materialism and consumerism and are the result of Gabriel's self-examination, after he considered whether he may have desired fame after all.

"We Do What We're Told (Milgram's 37)" was originally recorded for the 1980 album Peter Gabriel (or Melt). The song relates to the experiment on obedience carried out by the American social psychologist Stanley Milgram, intended as a reference to the obedience citizens show to dictators during times of war. Marotta's drums on the song – said to resemble "a heartbeat heard from the womb" – were coupled with Shankar's violin and "two overdubbed guitar tracks by Rhodes".

While "We Do What We're Told" was the final song on initial LP versions of the album, the cassette and CD releases close with "This Is the Picture (Excellent Birds)". "Excellent Birds" was composed with American musician Laurie Anderson. They recorded the song and they filmed music video over a period of three days — which was relatively quick by Gabriel's standards — for inclusion on the 1984 global satellite television broadcast Good Morning, Mr. Orwell. This was interpolated into a recording called "This Is the Picture", on which Nile Rodgers plays rhythm guitar. According to Anderson, she and Gabriel "could never agree on what a bassline was. (I think I probably don’t hear so well down there.) I wanted to learn from him, but it turned into a standoff and so we each put out our own version of the song." However, Gabriel remembered it slightly differently: both of them quite liked the song such that they agreed to release it on their own albums. Anderson's version, with Gabriel on additional vocals, appeared on her 1984 album Mister Heartbreak, which is closer to the version premiered on Good Morning, Mr. Orwell. Gabriel's own version was based on the groove, while Anderson's version was "more fragmented".

== Release ==
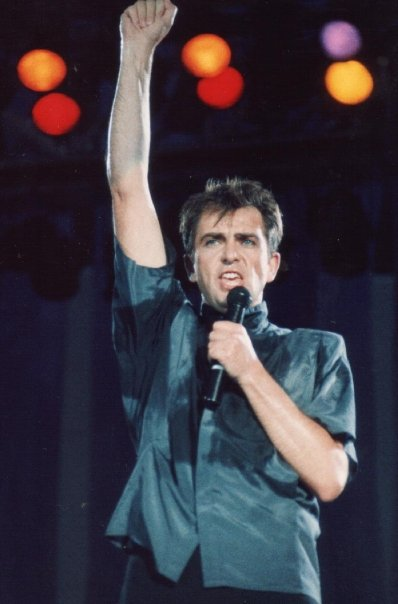
Gabriel performing at A Conspiracy of Hope in New Jersey, 1986

So is Gabriel's first non-eponymous album. Gabriel has noted his dislike for titling albums, mainly because it distracts from the sleeve design. In an interview for Rolling Stone, he explained that his American label Geffen Records refused to release Peter Gabriel IV until it was retitled Security. He elaborated that for So "[he] decided to go for the anti-title ... It can be more a piece of graphic, if you like, as opposed to something with meaning and intention. And that's what I've done ever since". When the album was profiled in the Classic Albums documentary series, Gabriel quipped that its short title meant it could be enlarged and useful when marketing it. Before the album was eventually named So, it was meant to be entitled Good. The album's cover is a portrait of Gabriel photographed by Trevor Key, who was then most famous for capturing the bell artwork for Mike Oldfield's Tubular Bells (1973). The sleeve was designed by Peter Saville and Brett Wickens; Saville was best known for designing several sleeves for Factory Records artists and was paid £20,000 for his work on So. According to Saville, the cover was based on the one he designed for New Order's album Low-Life the previous year, utilizing a similar method of taking Polaroid photos to produce a "groovy" portrait of the artist; Saville described the results as "contemporary, young but grown up, mature." Gabriel recalled: "The only compromise I made was to go with Peter Saville's idea for a retro-style portrait. I was told my usual obscure LP sleeves alienated women." Saville, meanwhile, stated that the cover was influenced by the impassioned tone and unusually accessible nature of the music, following a nighttime drive where he witnessed a car crash, then reluctantly started playing a test cassette of the album and was moved to tears by Gabriel's performance. The cover was partly influenced by photographer David Bailey's work.

So was released on 19 May 1986. It topped the charts of seven countries worldwide, including the United Kingdom, where it became Gabriel's second number one album. In the United States, So became one of Geffen Records' most commercially successful releases, peaking at number two and remaining on the chart for ninety-three weeks. In April 1986, "Sledgehammer" was released as the album's lead single and became Gabriel's first and only number one on the Billboard Hot 100, displacing his former band Genesis' first and only US number one "Invisible Touch". The track reached number four in the United Kingdom, where it ties with "Games Without Frontiers" as his highest-charting single, and peaked at number one in Canada. The success of "Sledgehammer" can be seen, in part, due to its hugely popular and innovative stop motion music video, designed by Aardman Animations. Gabriel would go on to say in an interview for Rolling Stone that he believed the video exposed So's songs to a wider audience, bolstering the album's success. Two high-charting singles followed, "Don't Give Up", which rose to number nine on the UK Singles Chart and a less successful seventy-nine in America, while "Big Time" peaked at number thirteen in the UK and number eight in America. "In Your Eyes" saw moderate success in America, where it reached twenty-six on the Hot 100, while "Red Rain" peaked at forty-six in the United Kingdom.

Bono contacted Gabriel to perform at A Conspiracy of Hope, a series of Live Aid-inspired concerts that intended to spread awareness of human rights issues in light of Amnesty International's twenty-fifth anniversary. Gabriel accepted and in June 1986, he performed alongside Sting, the Police, Lou Reed, and Joan Baez, with a set that opened with "Red Rain" and featured "Sledgehammer". Gabriel described it as "the best tour [he'd] ever been on". In the same month, Gabriel performed at London's Clapham Common, along with Boy George and Elvis Costello, for Artists Against Apartheid. Gabriel eventually embarked on the ninety-three date This Way Up tour to support So, beginning in Rochester, New York on 7 November 1986. One of the dates was a special two-night residency (20–21 December) at Tokyo's Meiji Jingu Stadium to fund a global computer system for the University for Peace, a United Nations project. The tour suspended in early 1987 until June when it reached Europe, before going on to America and finishing at the Lycabettus Amphitheatre in Athens in October. Gabriel partially performed So at The Prince's Trust Concert and at Human Rights Now! Tour in 1988.

== Critical reception ==
Professional ratings
Review scores
Source	Rating
AllMusic	4.5/5 stars
Entertainment Weekly	B
The Guardian	4/5 stars
Mojo	4/5 stars
Pitchfork	9.1/10
Q	4/5 stars
Record Collector	5/5 stars
The Rolling Stone Album Guide	5/5 stars
Uncut	8/10
The Village Voice	B−

=== Contemporary reviews ===
So received mostly favourable reviews from music critics. Music Week commented that So had "all the usual hallmarks of rhythm and vocals" associated with Gabriel. They also expressed their belief that the album was less adventurous than Gabriel's "groundbreaking groundbreaking third PG LP". Billboard said that the album "presents Gabriel with a warmth and directness almost certain to broaden his audience beyond the platinum mark". Cashbox believed that the album served as a continuation of Gabriel's work "at the leading edge of pop, transcending trend." Music & Media labeled it as "Gabriel's most accessible and streamlined album ever", adding that it was "one of the best albums released this year, both commercially and artistically."

Jon Pareles of The New York Times wrote "only a handful of Western rock musicians have managed to use exotic rhythms and instruments with so much ingenuity and conviction". Pareles also praised his vocals, describing them as "grainy but not bluesy, ageless and joyless, the voice of some ancient mariner recounting disasters". Tim Holmes of Rolling Stone described the album as "a record of considerable emotional complexity and musical sophistication" and felt that the mainstream pop music scene would be encouraged to innovate by the album.

Terry Atkinson of Los Angeles Times viewed the album as offering "an amazing variety of tones, moods and topics, and a consistently powerful level of expression". Although disliking "Big Time", Atkinson concluded So was "a great album, possibly Gabriel's best". Steve Hochman, also of Los Angeles Times, praised Gabriel's reinvention too, describing it as "real progress" compared to the contemporaneous work of other progressive rock acts such as Genesis, GTR and Marillion.

Chicago Tribune's Lynn Van Matre praised the album's "wave of funky rhythms" and called for more appreciation of Gabriel's talent, but noted a lack of "quirkiness" and said there were no tracks as impactful as his 1980 single "Biko". Robert Christgau was lukewarm in The Village Voice, writing that "Gabriel's so smart he knows rhythm is what makes music go, which relieves him of humdrum melodic responsibilities but doesn't get him up on the one—smart guys do go for texture in a pinch."

=== Retrospective reviews ===
So has continued to perform well in most retrospective reviews. Stephen Thomas Erlewine of AllMusic commended So as the "catchiest, happiest record he ever cut". Erlewine particularly praised Gabriel's fusion of art rock with African music and soul. Jude Rogers of the BBC wrote, "once you look past the bombast of 'Sledgehammer', ... you notice how easily its artful ideas slipped inside the 80s mainstream". The Quietus' Wyndham Wallace praised So's sincerity and called it "a heartfelt journey through intense emotional territory, assembled and arranged with intricacy and commitment, laboured over with such care that it sounds effortless".

Ryan Bray, writer for Consequence of Sound, concluded So was an "all-too-rare record that manages to have it both ways, earning its richly deserved critical and commercial respect without giving so much as an artistic inch". He added that "it still stands on its own two feet as one of the consensus best records of the 80s". Mark Blake of Q described the album as "carbon-dated to 1986 thanks to those blaring saxes and Fairlight CMI digital sampling synths". He added that "Gabriel crafted an album of user-friendly pop that was still reassuringly odd." Terry Staunton of Classic Rock wrote "Red Rain was familiarly pensive and politically charged, but the radio waves completely surrendered to the record's muscular dance rock and slower tempo eloquence." Staunton concluded that Gabriel had displayed "a masterful confidence, delivering a satisfyingly unified whole".

In a less positive retrospective review, Mojo's David Buckley contrasted the album with Gabriel's earlier, more experimental work, stating "on 1986's So, he switched tack to write pop, and write big. The results are mixed. 'Sledgehammer', echoing both Stevie Wonder's 'Superstition' and David Bowie's 'Fame', retains its punch. Elsewhere, Gabriel sounds airbrushed on 'Mercy Street', 'Red Rain' and 'In Your Eyes', with only 'We Do What We're Told' a reminder of a daring past." In a mostly positive 8/10 review for Uncut, John Lewis also directed criticism at the album. He praised its state-of-the-art production in parts, highlighting "Big Time" and "Sledgehammer" as standout tracks, but stated elsewhere it interfered in places, such as the Fairlight CMI synthesizer on "That Voice Again" and whistling ambient accompaniment on "Mercy Street".

== Legacy ==
Though the "Sledgehammer" video's ubiquity has bludgeoned the song, its parent album is a marvel ... awash in delicate percussion, tasteful keyboards, and bubbling bass, "Red Rain" and "Mercy Street" are stunning. Of the epics, the Kate Bush duet "Don't Give Up" is heartwrenching, while "In Your Eyes" achieved iconic status after its appearance in the John Cusack movie Say Anything. Excellent albums followed, but the breathtaking So is the best introduction to a dazzling discography.

— 1001 Albums You Must Hear Before You Die

At the 29th Annual Grammy Awards, So was nominated for Album of the Year, losing to Paul Simon's Graceland (1986), while "Sledgehammer" received nominations for Record of the Year, Song of the Year and Best Male Rock Vocal Performance. At the sixth Brit Awards, hosted by Jonathan King at the Grosvenor House Hotel, London, Gabriel won Best British Male Artist and "Sledgehammer" won Best British Music Video. Gabriel was most successful at the 1987 MTV Video Music Awards where he was honoured with the Video Vanguard Award and "Sledgehammer" won an additional nine awards including Video of the Year, a record that has not been challenged. Its video is the most played music video in the history of MTV.

So is often regarded as Gabriel's best album, as well as one of the best albums of the 1980s. It enabled Gabriel to transform from a cult artist, acclaimed for his cerebral, experimental solo work, into a mainstream, internationally known star. Rolling Stone placed So at 187 (2003 edition) and 297 (2020 edition) on its 500 Greatest Albums of All Time and at 14 on its 100 Best Albums of the 1980s, noting that "despite its mass appeal, however, So also presented compelling challenges." Stereogum placed it at number one on its list of Gabriel's best albums, writing, "Peter Gabriel's fifth studio album is a mesmerizing dichotomy: simultaneously hooky and experimental; timeless, yet completely crystallizing its moment in history ... It's a masterpiece.

So has been profiled in the Classic Albums series and featured in 1001 Albums You Must Hear Before You Die. Slant Magazine listed the album at 41 on its list of the 100 Best Albums of the 1980s, describing it as "Gabriel's most accessible yet ambitious work. A chronicle of political, emotional, and artistic exploration, the album [attempts] to balance standard pop orthodoxy with his still-rumbling desire for sonic experimentation". Jim Allen wrote for Ultimate Classic Rock, "What makes So important is the way he seamlessly blended peerless pop savvy with an iconoclast’s adventurous artistic instincts. His slightly twisted pop songs packed enough emotional impact, sonic surprises and catchy melodies to make for one of the era’s most consistently rewarding records." Conversely, in 2002 The Guardian's lead critic Alexis Petridis stated that Gabriel had "suffered a musical mid-life crisis", lampooning it as "an album packed with ultra-commercial priapic cod-funk" and calling it "a ruthless bid for mainstream success, yet he emerged without a stain on his avant-garde credentials".

So is Gabriel's best-selling album, having been certified fivefold platinum by the Recording Industry Association of America (RIAA) and triple platinum by the British Phonographic Industry (BPI). In 2002, So was re-issued and remastered. In 2011, several of tracks from So were featured on Gabriel's ninth studio release New Blood, a project of orchestral re-recordings from Gabriel's discography. In 2012, for the album's twenty-fifth anniversary, a limited-edition box set was released. It includes the remastered So album, the Live at Athens (1987) album and a So DNA album which examines its production, as well as new liner notes, photographs, vinyl collectibles and the So: Classic Albums documentary. In the same year, Gabriel embarked on the Back to Front Tour, where Gabriel plays every song on the So album with several of the session musicians from its recording.

Michael Glabicki of the American band Rusted Root acknowledges this album as a key influence on his own career exploring worldbeat music, saying, "I just kind of got locked into that sound. Peter Gabriel's So kind of gave everyone the go-ahead that this could work in a popular fashion. For people like me who were exploring those sounds, the wonder of if it's going to work or not just went away at that point." English musician Steven Wilson said, "People think the 80s were a shallow, superficial era", but he cited So as an album that was "really smart". Ozzy Osbourne revealed that So is one of his favorite albums, which he listened to repeatedly while also frequently singing its songs after release, and when he met Gabriel and complimented So, upon hearing production took three months he replied "Fuck, if I tried to make that album like that, it would take me thirty years."

== Track listing ==
All songs written by Peter Gabriel, except "That Voice Again" written with David Rhodes and "This Is the Picture (Excellent Birds)" written with Laurie Anderson.

Side one
No.	Title	Length
1.	"Red Rain"	5:39
2.	"Sledgehammer"	5:12
3.	"Don't Give Up"	6:33
4.	"That Voice Again"	4:53

Side two
No.	Title	Length
5.	"In Your Eyes"	5:27
6.	"Mercy Street"	6:22
7.	"Big Time"	4:28
8.	"We Do What We're Told (Milgram's 37)"	3:22
9.	"This Is the Picture (Excellent Birds)"	4:25

Notes:

- "This Is the Picture (Excellent Birds)" did not appear on vinyl pressings until 2002.
- "In Your Eyes" appears as side 2, track 5 (track 9 on CD) on all pressings from 2002 and later.

== Personnel ==
Credits adapted from So's liner notes. The track numbers correspond to the original release.

- Peter Gabriel – lead and backing vocals, CMI (all tracks), Prophet synthesizer (all except tracks 5 & 9), piano (all except tracks 7 & 9), Linn 9000 (tracks 3 & 7), synthesizer (tracks 5 & 7), percussion (track 4), Yamaha CS-80 (track 6), LinnDrum (track 9), Synclavier (track 9)
- Tony Levin – bass guitar (tracks 1–5), drumstick bass (fretting only) (track 7)
- David Rhodes – guitar (all except tracks 6 & 9), backing vocals (tracks 1 & 5)
- Jerry Marotta – drums (tracks 1 & 8), additional drums (track 5), bass guitar (drumming only) (track 7)
- Manu Katché – drums (tracks 2–5), percussion (tracks 3–5), talking drum (tracks 5 & 9)
- Chris Hughes – electronic drums, programming (track 1)
- Stewart Copeland – hi-hat (track 1), drums (track 7)
- Daniel Lanois – guitar (tracks 1, 2 & 4), tambourine (track 2), surf guitar (track 7), twelve-string guitar (track 9)
- Wayne Jackson – trumpet (tracks 2 & 7), cornet (track 7)
- Mark Rivera – tenor saxophone (tracks 2 & 7), processed saxophone (track 6), alto saxophone, baritone saxophone (track 7)
- Don Mikkelsen – trombone (tracks 2 & 7)
- P. P. Arnold – backing vocals (tracks 2 & 7)
- Coral Gordon – backing vocals (tracks 2 & 7)
- Dee Lewis – backing vocals (tracks 2 & 7)
- Richard Tee – piano (tracks 3, 5 & 6)
- Simon Clark – keyboards, backing vocals (track 3), Hammond organ, programming, bass guitar (track 7)
- Kate Bush – vocals (track 3)
- L. Shankar – violin (tracks 4 & 8)
- Larry Klein – bass guitar (tracks 5 & 6)
- Youssou N'Dour – backing vocals (track 5)
- Michael Been – backing vocals (track 5)
- Jim Kerr – backing vocals (track 5)
- Ronnie Bright – bass vocals (track 5)
- Djalma Corrêa – surdo, congas, triangle (track 6)
- Jimmy Bralower – programming kick (track 7)
- Bill Laswell – bass guitar (track 9)
- Nile Rodgers – guitar (track 9)
- Laurie Anderson – synthesizer and vocals (track 9)
- Kevin Killen – recording and mixing engineer
- David Bascombe – Original track recording
- Greg Fulginiti – mastering

== Charts ==
=== Weekly charts ===
Weekly chart performance for So
Chart (1986–1987)	Peak position
Australian Albums (Kent Music Report)	5
Austrian Albums (Ö3 Austria)	1
Canada Top Albums/CDs (RPM)	1
Dutch Albums (Album Top 100)	1
Finnish Albums (IFPI)	1
French Albums (SNEP)	12
German Albums (Offizielle Top 100)	2
Italian Albums (Musica e Dischi)	1
Japanese Albums (Oricon)	9
New Zealand Albums (RMNZ)	1
Norwegian Albums (VG-lista)	1
Spanish Albums (AFYVE)	1
Swedish Albums (Sverigetopplistan)	2
Swiss Albums (Schweizer Hitparade)	2
UK Albums (Official Charts)	1
US Billboard 200	2
US Top Catalog Albums (Billboard)	14

Chart (1992)	Peak position
US Top Catalog Albums (Billboard)	14

Chart (2012)	Peak position
Belgian Albums (Ultratop Flanders)	42
Belgian Albums (Ultratop Wallonia)	26
French Albums (SNEP)	61
Greek Albums (IFPI)	2
Italian Albums (FIMI)	18
Scottish Albums (Official Charts)	40
UK Physical Albums (OCC)	35

Chart (2016)	Peak position
US Vinyl Albums (Billboard)	18

Chart (2025)	Peak position
Greek Albums (IFPI)	1

=== Monthly charts ===
Monthly chart performance for So
Chart (1989)	Peak position
Soviet Albums (Moskovskij Komsomolets)	1

=== Year-end charts ===
Year-end chart performance for So
Chart (1986)	Position
Australian Albums (Kent Music Report)	31
Austrian Albums (Ö3 Austria)	9
Canada Top Albums/CDs (RPM)	7
Dutch Albums (Album Top 100)	13
French Albums (SNEP)	8
New Zealand Albums (RMNZ)	15
Swiss Albums (Schweizer Hitparade)	9
UK Albums (OCC)	19
US Billboard 200	35

Chart (1987)	Position
Australian Albums (Kent Music Report)	28
Canada Top Albums/CDs (RPM)	63
Dutch Albums (Album Top 100)	28
New Zealand Albums (RMNZ)	11
UK Albums (OCC)	38
US Billboard 200	21

== Certifications ==
Certifications for So
Region	Certification	Certified units/sales
Argentina (CAPIF)	Gold	30,000^{^}
Australia (ARIA)	3× Platinum	210,000^{^}
Belgium (BRMA)	Gold	25,000^{*}
France (SNEP)	Gold	100,000^{*}
Germany (BVMI)	Platinum	500,000^{^}
Hong Kong (IFPI Hong Kong)	Gold	10,000^{*}
Japan	—	132,000
Netherlands (NVPI)	Platinum	100,000^{^}
New Zealand (RMNZ)	5× Platinum	75,000^{^}
Spain (Promusicae)	Gold	50,000^{^}
Switzerland (IFPI Switzerland)	Platinum	50,000^{^}
United Kingdom (BPI)	3× Platinum	900,000^{^}
United States (RIAA)	5× Platinum	5,000,000^{^}
^{*} Sales figures based on certification alone.^{^} Shipments figures based on certification alone.
