= Sledgehammer (Peter Gabriel song) =

1986 single by Peter Gabriel

Single by Peter Gabriel

from the album So
- B-side: "Don't Break This Rhythm"; "I Have the Touch" (mix); "Biko" (ext.)
- Released: 14 April 1986
- Studio: Ashcombe House (Bath, England)
- Genre: Dance-rock; funk rock; soul; new wave
- Length: 5:12 (album version); 4:58 (7-inch single edit); 4:55 (video version)
- Label: Charisma (UK); Geffen (US)
- Songwriter: Peter Gabriel
- Producers: Peter Gabriel; Daniel Lanois

Peter Gabriel singles chronology
"Walk Through the Fire" (1984)	"Sledgehammer" (1986)	"Don't Give Up" (1986)

Music video
- "Sledgehammer" on YouTube

"Sledgehammer" is a song by the English rock musician Peter Gabriel. It was released in April 1986 as the lead single from his fifth studio album, So (1986). It was produced by Gabriel and Daniel Lanois. It reached No. 1 in Canada on 21 July 1986, and remained there for four weeks; No. 1 on the Billboard Hot 100 chart in the United States on 26 July 1986; and No. 4 on the UK Singles Chart, thanks in part to its music video, which was directed by Stephen R. Johnson. It was his biggest hit in North America and ties with "Games Without Frontiers" as his biggest hit in the United Kingdom.

The song's video won a record nine MTV Video Music Awards at the 1987 MTV Video Music Awards and Best British Video at the 1987 Brit Awards. The song also saw Gabriel nominated for three Grammy Awards for Best Male Rock Vocal Performance, Record of the Year and Song of the Year. In a 2005 poll conducted by Channel 4, the music video was ranked second on their list of the 100 Greatest Pop Videos.

== Background ==
"Sledgehammer" was initially written during the Birdy sessions in 1984. A version was recorded featuring bassist Leland Sklar and drummer Chester Thompson, but Gabriel was not satisfied with it. Thus, in Spring 1985, he revisited the song and recorded another version with his full backing band, including David Rhodes, Tony Levin and drummer Manu Katché. Gabriel presented the song just as they were packing up their equipment after initial sessions, citing his original intention to include the song on his next album after So. Manu Katché was preparing to board a taxi and return home to Paris when Gabriel coaxed him into recording "Sledgehammer". The song was recorded live in two or three takes with the full band playing and Gabriel on keyboards and vocals. Tony Levin opted to record his part on a fretless bass with a pick and through an octave pedal.

Gabriel noted that he was influenced by soul music when writing "Sledgehammer" and also considered recording a soul-oriented album with a mixture of covers and original compositions.

As a teenager, soul music was one of the things that made me want to be a musician. It was really passionate and exciting... Wayne Jackson, who plays on that track, was also with Otis Redding and was touring with him when I saw them in London. So that was a thrill for me, just to get a whole lot of fan stories. But I think the song was more influenced by many of those Stax and Atlantic tracks rather than Otis particularly."

— Peter Gabriel, July 1986

Gabriel contacted Jackson to assemble a horn section that included Jackson on trumpet, Mark Rivera on saxophone, and Don Mikkelsen on trombone. Gabriel explained that he wanted a real horn section on "Sledgehammer" to capture some of the intricacies of brass playing that could not be achieved with a synthesiser. He cited the slow brass swells in the second verse as an example of the expressiveness that he desired. The song also features a synthesised shakuhachi flute generated by an E-mu Systems synthesizer and resampled and layered with other sounds from the Fairlight CMI. Gabriel said that the "cheap organ sound" came from an expensive Prophet-5 synth, which he regarded as "an old warhorse" sound tool. The backing vocals were sung by P. P. Arnold, Coral "Chyna Whyne" Gordon, and Dee Lewis, who also did the backing for "Big Time". Overdubs for the horn section and backing vocals took place in September 1985 at Power Station Studios in New York City.

== Release ==
Gabriel pushed for "Sledgehammer" to be the first single from So because he considered it to be different from the rest of the album. When discussing the decision to release "Sledgehammer" as the album's first single, Gabriel said that "I think it was a surprise for people who have a fixed image of what I am and what I do."

All editions of the single included the track "Don't Break This Rhythm", whereas the twelve-inch single was appended with an "'85 Remix" of 1982's "I Have the Touch" as its B-side. US versions of the single also contained an extended dance remix of "Sledgehammer". The original album version of "Sledgehammer" had some print-through found during the intro, which was removed for the 2002 remaster of So released by Real World Records.

In the United States, "Sledgehammer" had received airplay on 77% of all contemporary hit radio stations by 30 May 1986 according to Radio & Records. By the week ending 19 July 1986, "Sledgehammer" had ascended to No. 2 on the Billboard Hot 100, just below "Invisible Touch", which was recorded by Gabriel's former band Genesis. Paul Grein of Billboard reported that this marked the first time that the top two positions on the Hot 100 were occupied by a band and a former member of the same group. "Sledgehammer" ascended to No. 1 the following week based on "outstanding" gains in sales and further improvements in airplay, becoming Gabriel's only No. 1 hit on the US Billboard Hot 100 and replacing "Invisible Touch" in the process. Genesis lead singer Phil Collins later jested about the occurrence in a 2014 interview, stating, "I read recently that Peter Gabriel knocked us off the No. 1 spot with 'Sledgehammer'. We weren't aware of that at the time. If we had been, we'd probably have sent him a telegram saying: 'Congratulations – bastard.'"

"Sledgehammer" also achieved success on other Billboard charts in 1986, spanning the Album Rock Tracks (two weeks at the summit in May and June) and Hot Dance Club Play (one week atop this chart in July). In the UK, the single peaked at number four, tying it with 1980's "Games Without Frontiers" as his highest-charting song in that country.

== Critical reception ==
"Sledgehammer" has been described as dance-rock, funk rock, soul, and new wave, Ryan Reed of Paste called the song a danceable "blue-eyed soul-strut". Billboard said that the song possessed a "straightforward r&b sound, almost as direct as its Stax/Volt ancestors." Cashbox called it a "riveting, hard-hitting track" that evoked the work of Steve Winwood. They also called the song a continuation of Gabriel's "innovative work" that manifested in "imaginative [and] creative results". Music & Media said that the song showcased Gabriel "in his most soulful mood ever."

Trouser Press gave it as an example of Gabriel's "characteristically sophisticated music" which in this case "touches on funk". Stewart Mason of AllMusic thought that "Sledgehammer"'s "earthier foundation keeps the song from getting distracted from the pounding, swaggering groove at its core", adding that "it's not his masterpiece, but it's probably his best pop song. Later attempts at rewriting it, like 1992's dismal 'Steam', didn't work half as well."

== Music video ==
The "Sledgehammer" music video was commissioned by Tessa Watts at Virgin Records, directed by Stephen R. Johnson and produced by Adam Whittaker. Aardman Animations and the Brothers Quay provided claymation, pixilation, and stop motion animation that gave life to images in the song. Johnson and Gabriel wanted the music video to be satisfying on repeat viewings and set out to accomplish this by incorporating multiple ideas that were both "inventive and funny". They spent a couple of weeks generating ideas and later invited Brothers Quay and Aardman Animations to develop the music video.

Gabriel said that the music video was shot frame by frame. For one scene, Gabriel lay under a sheet of glass for 16 hours with raw fish. "It took a lot of hard work," Gabriel recalled. "I was thinking at the time, 'If anyone wants to try and copy this video, good luck to them.'" For each frame of a ten-second sequence, clouds were painted across Gabriel's face to create the illusion of moving clouds.

Two dead, headless, featherless chickens were animated using stop motion and shown dancing along to the synthesised shakuhachi solo. This section was animated by Nick Park, of Aardman Animations, who was refining his work in plasticine animation at the time and later created Wallace & Gromit. The video ended with a large group of extras jerkily rotating around Gabriel, among them his daughters Anna-Marie and Melanie, the animators themselves and director Stephen Johnson's girlfriend. A total of 100 hours were spent shooting the music video, with each second of video consisting of 25 unique poses from Gabriel.

A major hit on music television, "Sledgehammer" won nine MTV Video Music Awards in 1987, the most awards a single video has won. It ranked at number four on MTV's 100 Greatest Music Videos Ever Made (1999). "Sledgehammer" has also been declared MTV's number one animated video of all time. The video was voted number seven on TMF's Ultimate 50 Videos You Must See, which first aired 24 June 2006. It ranked at number 2 on VH1's "Top 20 Videos of the '80s" and number one on "Amazing Moment in Music" on the Australian TV show 20 to 1 in 2007. It won Best British Video at the 1987 Brit Awards and was nominated for the Best Music Video category for the first annual Soul Train Music Awards in that same year.

According to Time magazine, "Sledgehammer"'s music video is the all-time most played music video on MTV. Gabriel recalled that the video was broadcast in the Soviet Union, India, and China, which had otherwise refrained from playing his other material.

The music video was remastered into 4K resolution, and was released in 2018 through Apple Music.

=== Accolades ===
Year	Nominee / work	Award	Result
1987	Brit Awards	British Single of the Year	Nominated
1987	Brit Awards	British Video of the Year	Won
1987	Grammy Award	Record of the Year	Nominated
1987	Grammy Award	Song of the Year	Nominated
1987	Grammy Award	Best Male Rock Vocal Performance	Nominated
1987	MTV Video Music Award	Video of the Year	Won
1987	MTV Video Music Award	Best Male Video	Won
1987	MTV Video Music Award	Best Concept Video	Won
1987	MTV Video Music Award	Most Experimental Video	Won
1987	MTV Video Music Award	Best Overall Performance	Won
1987	MTV Video Music Award	Best Direction	Won
1987	MTV Video Music Award	Best Visual Effects	Won
1987	MTV Video Music Award	Best Art Direction	Won
1987	MTV Video Music Award	Best Editing	Won
1987	MTV Video Music Award	Viewer's Choice Award	Nominated
1987	Soul Train Music Awards	Best Video of the Year	Nominated

== Live performances ==
Gabriel first performed "Sledgehammer" on his 1986-1987 This Way Up Tour. Akai samplers were used to pull the horn parts from the studio recording that were played by the Memphis Horns. The sounds were placed onto floppy discs and loaded into a keyboard played by David Sancious, who would then assign the parts to different notes of the instrument. He mentioned that he used "four different horn parts and different slides and punctuations", which were then spread across the keyboard. Sancious also used a keyboard to trigger the sound of shakuhachi flute and organ on this tour. He later included the song on his Secret World Tour.

== Personnel ==
Credits adapted from the liner notes of So.

- Peter Gabriel – vocals, E-mu Emulator II, Fairlight CMI, piano, Prophet-5
- Manu Katché – drums
- Tony Levin – bass
- David Rhodes – guitar
- Daniel Lanois – guitar, tambourine
- Wayne Jackson – trumpet
- Mark Rivera – saxophone
- Don Mikkelsen – trombone
- P. P. Arnold, Coral Gordon, Dee Lewis – backing vocals

== Charts ==
=== Weekly charts ===
Chart (1986)	Peak position
Australia (Kent Music Report)	3
Austria (Ö3 Austria Top 40)	2
Belgium (Ultratop 50 Flanders)	9
Canada Retail Singles (The Record)	1
Canada Top Singles (RPM)	1
Europe Airplay (IFPI)	2
Europe Top Singles (IFPI)	2
Finland (Suomen virallinen lista)	4
Ireland (IRMA)	3
Italy (Musica e dischi)	5
Luxembourg (Radio Luxembourg)	1
Netherlands (Dutch Top 40)	10
Netherlands (Single Top 100)	6
New Zealand (Recorded Music NZ)	3
Norway (VG-lista)	3
South Africa (Springbok Radio)	3
Sweden (Sverigetopplistan)	9
Switzerland (Schweizer Hitparade)	4
UK Singles (Official Charts)	4
US Album Rock Tracks (Billboard)	1
US Billboard Hot 100	1
US 12-inch Singles Sales (Billboard)	3
US Dance/Disco Club Play (Billboard)	1
US Hot Black Singles (Billboard)	61
US Cash Box Top 100	1
West Germany (GfK)	7

=== Year-end charts ===
Chart (1986)	Position
Australia (Kent Music Report)	34
Austria (Ö3 Austria Top 40)	10
Belgium (Ultratop 50 Flanders)	59
Canada Top Singles (RPM)	7
Netherlands (Dutch Top 40)	42
Netherlands (Single Top 100)	56
Switzerland (Schweizer Hitparade)	7
US Billboard Hot 100	23
US Cash Box Top 100	14
West Germany (Media Control)	20

== Certifications ==
Region	Certification	Certified units/sales
New Zealand (RMNZ)	Platinum	30,000^{‡}
United Kingdom (BPI)	Platinum	600,000^{‡}
^{‡} Sales+streaming figures based on certification alone.

== Covers and parodies ==
In 1986, "Weird Al" Yankovic parodied this song as the first song from his polka medley "Polka Party!" from the 1986 studio album of the same name.

== See also ==
- List of Billboard Hot 100 number ones of 1986
- List of Billboard Mainstream Rock number-one songs of the 1980s
- List of Cash Box Top 100 number-one singles of 1986
- List of number-one singles of 1986 (Canada)
- List of number-one dance singles of 1986 (U.S.)

== Bibliography ==
- Scott, George (2012). Classic Albums: So. Classic Albums. United Kingdom: Eagle Rock Entertainment and Peter Gabriel Records Ltd.
- Bowman, Durrell (2 September 2016). Experiencing Peter Gabriel: A Listener's Companion. Lanham, Maryland: Rowman & Littlefield. ISBN 9781442252004.
- Dean, Maury (2003). Rock n' Roll Gold Rush. Algora. ISBN 0-87586-207-1.
- Easlea, Daryl (2014). Without Frontiers: The Life and Music of Peter Gabriel. London, UK: Omnibus Press. ISBN 978-1-4683-0964-5.
- Pennanen, Timo (2006). Sisältää hitin - levyt ja esittäjät Suomen musiikkilistoilla vuodesta 1972 (in Finnish) (1st ed.). Helsinki: Tammi. ISBN 978-951-1-21053-5.
- Scarfe, Graeme (2021). Peter Gabriel: Every Album, Every Song. United Kingdom: SonicBond. ISBN 978-1-78952-138-2.
