= Peter Gabriel discography =

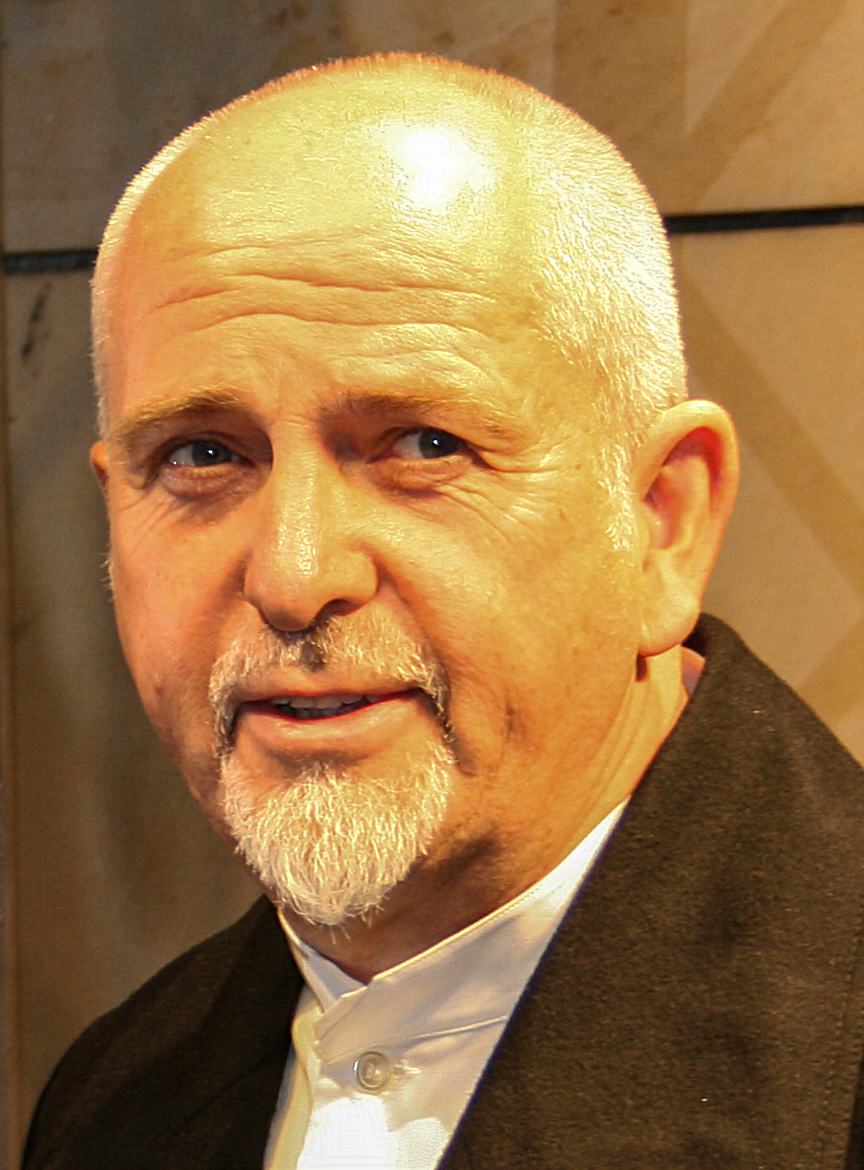
- Peter Gabriel in 2008
- Studio albums: 10
- Soundtrack albums: 4
- Live albums: 7
- Compilation albums: 5
- Singles: 46
- Video albums: 13
- Music videos: 30
- Other albums: 4

This is the solo discography of Peter Gabriel, an English singer-songwriter, musician and humanitarian activist who rose to fame as the lead vocalist and flautist of the progressive rock band Genesis. After leaving Genesis, Gabriel went on to pursue a successful solo career. His fifth studio album, So (1986), is his most commercially successful, selling five million copies in America, and the album's biggest hit, "Sledgehammer", won a record nine MTV Awards at the 1987 MTV Video Music Awards. The song is the most played music video in the history of the station.

Gabriel has been a champion of world music for much of his career. He co-founded the WOMAD festival in 1982. He has continued to focus on producing and promoting world music through his Real World Records label. He has also pioneered digital distribution methods for music, co-founding OD2, one of the first online music download services. Gabriel has been involved in numerous humanitarian efforts. In 1980, he released the anti-apartheid single "Biko". He has participated in several human rights benefit concerts, including Amnesty International's Human Rights Now! tour in 1988, and co-founded the Witness human rights organisation in 1992. In collaboration with entrepreneur Richard Branson, Gabriel developed The Elders, which was launched by Nelson Mandela in 2007.

Gabriel has won numerous music awards throughout his career, including three Brit Awards—winning Best British Male in 1987, six Grammy Awards, thirteen MTV Video Music Awards, the first Pioneer Award at the BT Digital Music Awards, and in 2007, he was honoured as a BMI Icon at the 57th annual BMI London Awards for his "influence on generations of music makers". In recognition of his many years of human rights activism, he received the Man of Peace award from the Nobel Peace Prize Laureates in 2006, and in 2008, TIME magazine named Gabriel one of the 100 most influential people in the world. Gabriel was also awarded the Ivor Novello Award for Lifetime Achievement in 2007, and the Polar Music Prize in 2009.

AllMusic has described Gabriel as "one of rock's most ambitious, innovative musicians, as well as one of its most political." He was inducted into the Rock and Roll Hall of Fame as a member of Genesis in 2010, followed by his induction as a solo artist in 2014.

== Albums ==
=== Studio albums ===
Title	Album details	Peak chart positions											Sales	Certifications
Title	Album details	UK	AUS	CAN	FRA	GER	ITA	NLD	NOR	NZ	SWE	US	Sales	Certifications
Peter Gabriel (aka Peter Gabriel 1: Car)	Released: 25 February 1977; Label: Charisma; Formats: LP, MC	7	25	30	—	24	9	9	5	38	8	38		BPI: Gold; BVMI: Gold; SNEP: Gold; RIAA: Gold
Peter Gabriel (aka Peter Gabriel 2: Scratch)	Released: 2 June 1978; Label: Charisma; Formats: LP, MC	10	50	46	—	49	—	48	—	24	—	45		MC: Platinum
Peter Gabriel (aka Peter Gabriel 3: Melt)	Released: 30 May 1980; Label: Charisma; Formats: LP, MC	1	29	7	—	9	24	—	—	—	—	22		BPI: Gold; MC: 2× Platinum; SNEP: Gold
Peter Gabriel (aka Peter Gabriel 4: Security)	Released: 10 September 1982; Label: Charisma; Formats: LP, MC	6	66	2	—	84	10	14	15	18	—	28		BPI: Gold; MC: Platinum; RIAA: Gold
So	Released: 19 May 1986; Label: Charisma; Formats: CD, LP, MC	1	5	1	61	2	1	1	1	1	2	2		BPI: 3× Platinum; ARIA: 3× Platinum; BVMI: Platinum; NVPI: Platinum; RIAA: 5× Platinum; RMNZ: 5× Platinum; SNEP: Gold
Us	Released: 28 September 1992; Label: Real World; Formats: CD, LP, MC	2	3	4	—	1	3	8	7	6	2	2	US: 1,600,000	ARIA: Platinum; BPI: Platinum; BVMI: Platinum; FIMI: 3× Platinum; GLF: Gold; MC: 2× Platinum; RIAA: Platinum; RMNZ: Gold; SNEP: Gold
Up	Released: 23 September 2002; Label: Real World; Formats: CD, LP	11	37	2	4	4	1	18	11	35	6	9	US: 338,000	BPI: Silver; BVMI: Gold; MC: Gold
Scratch My Back	Released: 12 February 2010; Label: Real World; Formats: CD, LP, digital download	12	59	2	4	2	3	10	11	15	5	26		FIMI: Gold
New Blood	Released: 9 October 2011; Label: Real World; Formats: CD, LP, digital download	22	64	9	12	6	6	12	13	—	19	30		BPI: Silver
I/O	Released: 1 December 2023; Label: Real World; Formats: CD, LP, digital download	1	20	80	7	2	4	5	—	23	45	99		
O\I	Expected release: late 2026; Label: Real World; Formats: CD, LP, digital download	To be released												

=== Soundtrack albums ===
Title	Album details	Peak chart positions							Certifications
Title	Album details	UK	AUS	GER	ITA	NLD	SWE	US	Certifications
Birdy (Music from Birdy)	Released: 18 March 1985; Label: Charisma; Formats: LP, MC	51	—	—	—	—	30	162	
Passion (Music from The Last Temptation of Christ)	Released: 5 June 1989; Label: Real World; Formats: CD, LP, MC	29	—	30	24	59	34	60	RIAA: Gold
OVO (Music from the Millennium Dome Show)	Released: 12 June 2000; Label: Real World; Formats: CD, MC	24	90	14	4	66	54	—	
Long Walk Home: Music from the Rabbit-Proof Fence (Music from Rabbit-Proof Fence)	Released: 15 April 2002; Label: Real World; Formats: CD, MC	—	—	78	34	—	—	—	

=== Live albums ===
Title	Album details	Peak chart positions									Certifications
Title	Album details	UK	AUS	FRA	GER	ITA	NLD	NZ	SWE	US	Certifications
Plays Live	Released: 6 June 1983; Label: Charisma; Formats: CD, LP, MC	8	55	—	40	—	21	25	31	44	
Secret World Live	Released: 30 August 1994; Label: Real World; Formats: CD, MC	10	34	—	8	11	16	—	24	23	BPI: Silver; BVMI: Gold; MC: Gold; RIAA: Gold; SNEP: Gold
Live Blood	Released: 23 April 2012; Label: Real World; Formats: CD, digital download	195	—	185	65	88	—	—	—	—	
Back to Front: Live in London	Released: 23 June 2014; Label: Real World; Formats: CD, digital download	—	—	—	7	—	—	—	—	—	
Growing Up: Live	Released: 8 February 2019; Label: Real World; Formats: LP, digital download	—	—	—	31	—	—	—	—	—	
In The Big Room	Released: 27 June 2025; Label: Real World; Formats: CD, LP, digital download	—	—	—	12	—	98	—	—	—	
Live at WOMAD 1982	Released: 8 August 2025; Label: Real World; Formats: Digital download	—	—	—	45	—	—	—	—	—	

Encore Series 2003, Encore Series 2004, Encore Series 2007, Encore Series 2009, Encore Series 2012, Encore Series 2013, Encore Series 2014 and Encore Series 2014-winter

=== Compilation albums ===
Title	Album details	Peak chart positions									Certifications
Title	Album details	UK	AUS	GER	ITA	NLD	NZ	SWE	SWI	US	Certifications
Shaking the Tree: Sixteen Golden Greats	Released: 19 November 1990; Label: Real World; Formats: CD, LP, MC	11	41	12	—	14	18	10	27	48	BPI: 2× Platinum; BVMI: Platinum; IFPI SWI: Gold; NVPI: Gold; RIAA: 2× Platinum; RMNZ: Gold
Revisited	Released: 10 November 1992; Label: Atlantic; Formats: CD, MC; Not released in the UK	—	—	—	—	—	—	—	—	—	
Hit	Released: 3 November 2003; Label: Real World; Formats: CD	29	—	25	17	—	34	—	16	100	BPI: Gold
Rated PG	Released: 13 April 2019; Label: Real World; Formats: CD, LP	—	—	97	—	—	—	—	37	—	
Flotsam and Jetsam	Released: 13 September 2019; Label: Real World; Formats: Digital download	—	—	—	—	—	—	—	—	—	

=== Other albums ===
Title	Album details	Peak chart positions			Notes
Title	Album details	FRA	GER	US	Notes
Ein deutsches Album	Released: July 1980; Label: Charisma; Formats: LP, MC	—	65	—	German language version of Peter Gabriel 3
Deutsches Album	Released: September 1982; Label: Charisma; Formats: LP, MC	—	—	—	German language version of Peter Gabriel 4
Big Blue Ball	Released: 24 June 2008; Label: Real World; Formats: CD	12	—	130	Album by Big Blue Ball (Peter Gabriel and various artists)
Full Stretch	Released: January 2012; Label: La Fabrica Revista Matador; Formats: CD	—	—	—	Free with Spanish Matador magazine. Four ambient tracks based on New Blood recordings.

== Singles ==
Title	Year	Peak chart positions										Certifications	Album
Title	Year	UK	AUS	CAN	GER	ITA	IRE	NLD	SWI	NZ	US	Certifications	Album
"Solsbury Hill"	1977	13	45	92	16	24	—	13	—	—	68	BPI: Platinum; RMNZ: 2× Platinum	Peter Gabriel 1
"Modern Love"	1977	—	—	—	—	—	—	—	—	—	—		Peter Gabriel 1
"D.I.Y."	1978	—	—	—	—	—	—	—	—	—	—		Peter Gabriel 2
"Games Without Frontiers"	1980	4	44	7	36	—	3	—	—	—	48	BPI: Silver	Peter Gabriel 3
"No Self-Control"	1980	33	—	—	—	—	—	—	—	—	—		Peter Gabriel 3
"Spiel ohne Grenzen"	1980	—	—	—	—	—	—	—	—	—	—		Ein deutsches Album
"Biko"	1980	38	—	—	—	—	—	—	—	—	—		Peter Gabriel 3
"I Don't Remember"	1980	—	—	—	—	—	—	—	—	—	107		Peter Gabriel 3
"Shock the Monkey"^{[a]}	1982	58	25	10	—	2	—	—	—	—	29		Peter Gabriel 4
"I Have the Touch"	1982	—	—	—	—	—	—	—	—	—	—		Peter Gabriel 4
"I Don't Remember" (live)	1983	62	—	—	—	—	—	—	—	—	—		Plays Live
"Solsbury Hill" (live)	1983	—	—	—	—	—	—	—	—	—	84		Plays Live
"Walk Through the Fire"	1984	69	—	—	—	—	—	—	—	—	—		Against All Odds
"Sledgehammer"^{[b]}	1986	4	3	1	7	5	3	6	4	3	1	BPI: Platinum; RMNZ: Platinum	So
"In Your Eyes"	1986	—	97	29	—	—	—	—	—	50	26	RIAA: Gold; RMNZ: Gold	So
"Don't Give Up" (with Kate Bush)	1986	9	5	40	27	—	4	5	—	16	72	RMNZ: Gold	So
"Big Time"	1986	13	37	15	38	—	11	25	—	19	8		So
"Red Rain"	1987	46	—	—	—	—	27	—	—	—	—		So
"Biko" (live)	1987	49	—	—	—	—	—	—	—	41	—		Non-album single
"In Your Eyes" (reissue)	1989	—	—	—	—	—	—	—	—	—	41		Say Anything...
"Shakin' the Tree" (with Youssou N'Dour)^{[c]}	1989	61	—	—	—	—	—	—	—	—	—		The Lion
"Solsbury Hill" / "Shaking the Tree" (with Youssou N'Dour)	1990	57	121	—	—	—	—	26	—	—	—		Shaking the Tree
"Digging in the Dirt"^{[d]}	1992	24	23	6	23	—	—	39	12	25	52		Us
"Steam"^{[e]}	1993	10	29	1	48	—	7	27	—	7	32		Us
"Blood of Eden" (with Sinéad O'Connor)	1993	43	112	73	—	—	—	—	—	—	—		Us
"Kiss That Frog"^{[f]}	1993	46	—	36	—	—	—	—	—	—	—		Us
"Come Talk to Me" (with Sinéad O'Connor)	1993	—	—	—	—	—	—	—	—	—	—		Us
"Lovetown"^{[g]}	1994	49	—	—	95	—	—	—	—	17	—		Philadelphia
SW Live EP: "Red Rain" (live)	1994	39	—	63	—	—	—	—	—	—	—		Secret World Live
"While the Earth Sleeps" (with Deep Forest)	1996	—	—	—	—	25	—	—	—	—	—		Strange Days
"When You're Falling" (Afro Celt Sound System featuring Peter Gabriel)^{[h]}	2001	—	—	—	—	—	—	86	—	—	—		Volume 3: Further in Time
"The Barry Williams Show"^{[i]}	2002	—	—	—	66	10	—	—	81	—	—		Up
"More Than This"	2002	47	—	—	—	39	—	—	—	—	—		Up
"Growing Up"	2003	—	—	—	—	35	—	—	—	—	—		Up
"Burn You Up, Burn You Down"	2003	78	—	—	—	49	—	—	—	—	—		Hit
"Darkness" (remixes)	2004	—	—	—	—	—	—	—	—	—	—		Up
"Salala"^{[j]} (Angélique Kidjo featuring Peter Gabriel)	2007	—	—	—	—	—	—	—	—	—	—		Djin Djin
"Whole Thing" (with Francis Bebey, Alex Faku, Tim Finn, Karl Wallinger, Andy White)	2007	—	—	—	—	—	—	—	—	—	—		Big Blue Ball
"Burn You Up, Burn You Down" (with Billy Cobham, The Holmes Brothers, Wendy Melvoin, Arona N'diaye, Jah Wobble)	2008	—	—	—	—	—	—	—	—	—	—		Big Blue Ball
"Down to Earth" (with The Soweto Gospel Choir)	2008	—	—	73	—	—	—	—	—	—	—		WALL-E
"The Book of Love"	2010	—	—	—	93	—	—	—	—	—	—		Scratch My Back
"Courage"	2013	—	—	—	—	—	—	—	—	—	—		So 25th Anniversary Box Set
"I'm Amazing"	2016	—	—	—	—	—	—	—	—	—	—		Non-album singles
"The Veil"	2016	—	—	—	—	—	—	—	—	—	—		Non-album singles
"Panopticom"	2023	—	—	—	—	—	—	—	—	—	—		I/O
"The Court"	2023	—	—	—	—	—	—	—	—	—	—		I/O
"Playing for Time"	2023	—	—	—	—	—	—	—	—	—	—		I/O
"I/O"	2023	—	—	—	—	—	—	—	—	—	—		I/O
"Four Kinds of Horses"	2023	—	—	—	—	—	—	—	—	—	—		I/O
"Road to Joy"^{[k]}	2023	—	—	—	—	—	—	—	—	—	—		I/O
"So Much"	2023	—	—	—	—	—	—	—	—	—	—		I/O
"Olive Tree"	2023	—	—	—	—	—	—	—	—	—	—		I/O
"Love Can Heal"	2023	—	—	—	—	—	—	—	—	—	—		I/O
"This Is Home"	2023	—	—	—	—	—	—	—	—	—	—		I/O
"And Still"	2023	—	—	—	—	—	—	—	—	—	—		I/O
"Live and Let Live"	2023	—	—	—	—	—	—	—	—	—	—		I/O
"Been Undone"	2026	—	—	—	—	—	—	—	—	—	—		O\I
"Put the Bucket Down""	2026	—	—	—	—	—	—	—	—	—	—		O\I
"What Lies Ahead"	2026	—	—	—	—	—	—	—	—	—	—		O\I
"—" denotes a recording that did not chart or was not released in that territory. "x" denotes the chart did not exist at the time.

Notes

a. "Shock the Monkey" also reached No. 64 on the Billboard R&B Singles chart and No. 26 on the Dance Music/Club Play chart.
b. "Sledgehammer" also reached No. 61 on the Billboard Hot R&B/Hip-Hop Singles & Tracks chart and No. 1 on the Dance Music/Club Play chart.
c. "Shakin' the Tree" also reached No. 9 on the Billboard Modern Rock Tracks chart.
d. "Digging in the Dirt" also reached No. 1 on the Billboard Modern Rock Tracks chart.
e. "Steam" also reached No. 1 on the Billboard Modern Rock Tracks chart.
f. "Kiss That Frog" also reached No. 18 on the Billboard Modern Rock Tracks chart.
g. "Lovetown" also reached No. 22 on the Billboard Modern Rock Tracks chart.
h. "When You're Falling" also reached No. 27 on the Billboard Adult Top 40 chart.
i. "The Barry Williams Show" was deemed ineligible for the UK Singles Chart, as its length broke chart regulations for single releases, therefore it was instead listed as an EP and featured on the Budget Albums Chart where it reached No. 4.
j. "Salala" reached No. 21 on the Adult Alternative Airplay chart.
k. "Road to Joy" reached No. 4 on the Adult Alternative Airplay chart.

== Other charting tracks ==
Year	Song	CAN	US Main	Album
1982	"Kiss of Life"	—	34	Peter Gabriel 4
1983	"I Go Swimming"	—	38	Plays Live
1986	"That Voice Again"	—	14	So
1993	"Secret World"	90	34	Us

== Non-album tracks ==
=== Studio ===
Year	Song(s)	Album	Notes
1976	"Strawberry Fields Forever"	All This and World War II	The Beatles cover; compiled on Flotsam and Jetsam
1982	"Across the River"	Music and Rhythm	original song; compiled on Flotsam and Jetsam
1984	"Walk Through the Fire"	Against All Odds	original song; compiled on Rated PG; single version compiled on Flotsam and Jetsam
1984	"Out Out"	Gremlins	original song
1985	"No More Apartheid"	Sun City	original song with L. Shankar
1994	"Lovetown"	Philadelphia	original song; compiled on Hit
1994	"Taboo"	Natural Born Killers	original song with Nusrat Fateh Ali Khan; compiled on Rated PG
1994	"Summertime"	The Glory of Gershwin	George & Ira Gershwin cover; compiled on Flotsam and Jetsam
1995	"Party Man"	Virtuosity	original song with The Worldbeaters; new version on Rated PG
1995	"While the Earth Sleeps"	Strange Days	original song with Deep Forest
1995	"Suzanne"	Tower of Song	Leonard Cohen cover; compiled on Flotsam and Jetsam
1997	"In the Sun"	Diana, Princess of Wales: Tribute	Joseph Arthur song, originally recorded by Gabriel; compiled on Flotsam and Jetsam
1998	"That'll Do"	Babe: Pig in the City	original song with Paddy Maloney and The Black Dyke Mills Band, written by Randy Newman; compiled on Rated PG
2002	"Animal Nation"	The Wild Thornberrys Movie	original song; compiled on Flotsam and Jetsam
2008	"Down to Earth"	WALL-E	original song with Thomas Newman, compiled on Rated PG
2022	"Here It Is"	Here It Is: A Tribute to Leonard Cohen	

=== Appears on ===
- 1970 "Katmandu" <flute> on the album Mona Bone Jakon by Cat Stevens
- 1979 "Exposure" and "Here Comes the Flood" on the album Exposure by Robert Fripp
- 1981 "Animals Have More Fun" with Jimmy Pursey
- 1981 "Screaming Jets" on the album Walking into Mirrors by Johnny Warman
- 1984 "Gravity's Angel", "Language D'Amour" and "Excellent Birds" on the album Mister Heartbreak by Laurie Anderson
- 1985 "Take Me Home" <backing vocals> on the album No Jacket Required by Phil Collins
- 1986 "Everywhere I Go" <backing vocals> on the album Reconciled by The Call
- 1987 "Fallen Angel" and "Broken Arrow" on the album Robbie Robertson by Robbie Robertson; "Do What You Do" and "I Got Your Message" on the album Do What You Do by The Epidemics; "Winds of Change (Mandela to Mandela)" on the album Female Trouble by Nona Hendryx
- 1988 "My Secret Place" from the album Chalk Mark in a Rain Storm by Joni Mitchell
- 1989 "Shakin' the Tree" by Youssou N'Dour on the album The Lion
- 1990 "Soul Searcher" <keyboards> by L. Shankar; "Land of Anaka" <backing vocals> by Geoffrey Oryema on the album Exile
- 1991 "Fisherman's Song", "Lullaby", "Octopuse's Song", "Song of the Seashell" and "Witch's Song" on the album Die Nixe - The Mermaid; "Silence" and "Warm Doorway" <backing vocals> on the album It's About Time by Manu Katché
- 1994 "I Met a Man" on the album The Woman's Boat by Toni Childs; "Quelquer Coisa A Haver Com O Paraíso on the album Angelus by Milton Nascimento; "Biko" <backing vocals> on the album Wakafrika by Manu Dibango
- 1996 "I'm Still Looking for a Home" on the album Tender City by Joy Askew; "Hush, Hush, Hush" on the album This Fire by Paula Cole; "Mercedes" <backing vocals> by Joseph Arthur
- 1998 storyteller on the album Snowflake by Paul Gallico; "Blind" on the album Soularium by Sister Soleil
- 1999 "Kufilaw" with Maryam Mursal on the album 11 out of 10; "Carpet Crawlers '99" by Genesis
- 2000 "This Dream" <backing vocals> by Youssou N'Dour on the album Joko from Village to Town and/or "Joko: The Link"
- 2004 "Washing of the Water" with Jools Holland & his Rhythm & Blues Orchestra on the album Friends 3
- 2006 "Here Comes The Flood" (quiet version) and "Preface" on the album Exposure by Robert Fripp – reissue with extra tracks
- 2016 "A.I." on the album Oh My My by OneRepublic
- 2022 "Unconditional II (Race and Religion)" on the album WE by Arcade Fire

=== Amnesty International ¡Released! The Human Rights Concerts compilations ===
A series of live compilation albums released in 2013.

- 1986: A Conspiracy of Hope: Recorded at Giants Stadium, New Jersey, USA, on 15 June 1986, includes: "Red Rain", "Shock the Monkey" and "Family Snapshot".
- 1988: Human Rights Now!: Recorded live at River Plate Stadium, Buenos Aires, Argentina, 15 October 1988, includes: Peter Gabriel "Sledgehammer", "Biko"; Peter Gabriel with Youssou N'Dour "In Your Eyes"; Bruce Springsteen, Sting, Peter Gabriel, Youssou N'Dour, Tracy Chapman (with The E-Street Band) "Chimes of Freedom", "Get Up, Stand Up".
- 1990: An Embrace of Hope…: Recorded live at National Stadium Stadium, Santiago, Chile on 13 October 1990, includes "Biko".
- 1998: The Struggle Continues…: Recorded live at Palais Omnisports de Paris-Bercy, Paris, France on 10 December 1998, includes: Bruce Springsteen, Peter Gabriel, Youssou N'Dour, Tracy Chapman "Get Up, Stand Up"; Peter Gabriel, Youssou N'Dour "Signal to Noise", "In Your Eyes", "Shaking the Tree"; Youssou N'Dour, Peter Gabriel, Tracy Chapman, Jocelyne Beroard "7 Seconds"

=== Other songs ===
- 1981 "Not One of Us (Live)", "Humdrum (Live)" and "Ain't That Peculiar (Live)" on The Bristol Recorder 2
- 1984 "I Go Swimming" (Live) (Hard to Hold soundtrack)
- 1987 "Biko (Live)" by Habib Faye, Lou Reed, Papa Oumar N'Gom, Peter Gabriel, Rick Bell, & Youssou N'Dour (The Secret Policeman's Third Ball)
- 1990 "Drone" on the album One World One Voice
- 1993 "Be Still" with Sinéad O'Connor, Feargal Sharkey, and others as Peace Together, on the album Peace Together
- 1994 "Biko (Live)" (Woodstock '94)
- 1996 "I Have the Touch ('96 Remix)" (Remixed by Robbie Robertson and P. Gabriel, music from the motion picture Phenomenon); 1996 "Seven Zero" (Real World CD-Extra #2)
- 1997 "Shaking the Tree '97 (Jungle Version) (Jungle 2 Jungle soundtrack)
- 1998 "I Grieve" (City of Angels soundtrack, re-edit later released on Up); 1998 "Brimstone" (Real World Notes E-CD #7) (50 second intro to TV series Brimstone)
- 2000 "The Tower That Ate People (Remix)" (Red Planet soundtrack); 2000 "100 Days to Go" (Real World Notes E-CD #9) (consists of The Tower That Ate People/Revenge/The Rhythm of the Heat)
- 2002 "Shaking the Tree (02 Remix)" (The Wild Thornberrys Movie soundtrack); 2002 "Signal to Noise" (Gangs of New York soundtrack) (instrumental version)
- 2004 "The Book of Love," song by Stephin Merrit (Shall We Dance? soundtrack, re-recorded for Scratch My Back; compiled on Rated PG)
- 2007 "Different Stories, Different Lives" (with The Footnote and Angie Pollock Sea Monsters: A Prehistoric Adventure soundtrack, unreleased)

== Production ==
Title	Album details	Peak chart positions		
Title	Album details	FRA	GER	US
Passion – Sources	Released: 1989; Label: Real World	—	—	—
Plus from Us	Released: 16 May 1993; Label: Real World	—	—	—
And I'll Scratch Yours	Released: 23 September 2013; Label: Real World	127	19	183

== Videos ==
=== Video albums ===
- 1987 CV (compilation of videos, VHS) (RIAA: Gold)
- 1990 POV (live concert from the So tour 1987, VHS)
- 1993 All About Us (videos for Us album, VHS)
- 1994 Secret World Live (live concert from the Secret World Tour 1993/94, VHS) (RIAA: Platinum)
- 2002 Secret World Live (reissue, first time on DVD)
- 2003 Growing Up: Live (live concert from the Growing Up Tour 2002/03, DVD) (RIAA: Platinum)
- 2004 Growing Up on Tour: A Family Portrait (Peter Gabriel's daughter, Anna-Marie Gabriel, directs a film about her father's Growing Up and Still Growing Up tours, DVD)
- 2004 Play (compilation of videos, including bonus videos and remastered sound. The music has been remixed on several tracks and the original mix is available as an alternate audio track, DVD)
- 2005 Still Growing Up: Live & Unwrapped (live concert from the Still Growing Up Tour 2004, DVD)
- 2011 New Blood: Live in London (live concert from the New Blood tour 2011, DVD)
- 2013 Classic Albums: So (documentary on the making of the So album, DVD)
- 2013 Live in Athens 1987 (reissue of POV, first time on DVD)
- 2014 Back to Front: Live in London (live concert from the Back to Front tour 2013, DVD)

=== Music videos ===
Year	Title	Director
1977	"Modern Love"	Peter Medak
1980	"Games Without Frontiers"	David Mallet
1982	"Shock the Monkey"	Brian Grant
1983	"I Don't Remember"	Marcello Anciano
1984	"This Is the Picture (Excellent Birds)"	Dean Winkler
1986	"Sledgehammer"	Stephen R. Johnson
1986	"Mercy Street"	Matt Mahurin
1986	"Don't Give Up" (version 1)	Lol Creme, Kevin Godley
1986	"Don't Give Up" (version 2)	Jim Blashfield
1986	"In Your Eyes"	Graham Dean, Peter Gabriel
1986	"Red Rain"	Matt Mahurin
1987	"Big Time"	Stephen R. Johnson
1987	"Biko"	Lol Creme
1987	"Fallen Angel" (Robbie Robertson featuring Peter Gabriel)	David Hogan
1988	"Zaar"	Stefan Roloff
1988	"My Secret Place" (Joni Mitchell featuring Peter Gabriel)	Anton Corbijn
1990	"Solsbury Hill"	Jerry Chater, Graham Dean, Peter Gabriel
1990	"Shaking the Tree"	Isaac Julien
1992	"Steam"	Stephen R. Johnson
1992	"Digging in the Dirt"	John Downer
1993	"Blood of Eden"	Nicola Bruce, Michael Coulson
1993	"Kiss That Frog"	Brett Leonard
1993	"Come Talk to Me"	Matt Mahurin
1993	"Lovetown"	Michael Coulson
2000	"The Nest That Sailed the Sky"	York Tillyer
2001	"While You're Falling" (Afro Celt Sound System featuring Peter Gabriel)	Andy Berg
2002	"Growing Up"	François Vogel
2003	"The Barry Williams Show"	Sean Penn
2003	"The Drop"	Glenn Marshall
2003	"Washing of the Water"	York Tillyer
2004	"Father, Son"	Anna Gabriel
2023	"Love Can Heal"	—N/a
