= Birds Like Us =

- Film poster
- Bosnian: Ptice kao mi
- Turkish: Kuşlar Bizim Gibi
- Directed by: Faruk Šabanović; Amela Ćuhara
- Written by: Olivia Hetreed; Faruk Šabanović
- Based on: The Conference of the Birds by Attar of Nishapur
- Produced by: Adnan Ćuhara
- Cinematography: Faruk Šabanović
- Music by: Timothy Bruzon; Peter Gabriel
- Production companies: Prime Time; Turkish Radio & Television; Autonomous; Fork Films
- Distributed by: Lionsgate; Grindstone Entertainment Group (United States); Kaleidoscope Film Distribution (United Kingdom)
- Release dates: May 5, 2017 (Stuttgart); August 16, 2017 (Sarajevo); November 30, 2017 (Doha); October 16, 2018 (Turkey); January 25, 2022 (United States)
- Running time: 84 minutes
- Countries: Bosnia and Herzegovina; Turkey; United Kingdom; United States; Qatar
- Language: English
- Budget: € 7.5 million
- Box office: € 2 million

Birds Like Us (Bosnian: Ptice kao mi; Turkish: Kuşlar Bizim Gibi) is a 2017 animated fantasy adventure film directed by Faruk Šabanović and Amela Ćuhara. The film is an animated free adaptation of the Attar of Nishapur poem, "The Conference of the Birds". It features the Peter Gabriel song "Everybird", which was composed for the film and also appears on the album "Rated PG".

== Cast ==
- Alicia Vikander: Huppu
- Jeremy Irons: Kondor / Mi
- Jim Broadbent: Horozovich
- Sheridan Smith: Gavra
- Kevin Bishop: Hassan
- Christopher Villiers: Craven
- Michele Austin: Jula
- Khalid Abdalla: Bat
- Ella Smith: Tifa

== Critical reception ==
Writing for Screen Daily, critic Wendy Ide reported that the film "eschews the source material's delicate layering of symbolic allusion in favour of a baffling assault of visual non-sequiturs," and that "thanks to the esoteric plotting and disorientating animation, clarity is missing in action." A review on Dove.org described the film as not "look[ing] like your garden-variety animated film" and that "It's occasionally funny [and] eventually hopeful."
