= I Don't Remember (Peter Gabriel song) =

1980 single by Peter Gabriel

Single by Peter Gabriel

from the album Peter Gabriel (Melt)
- B-side: "Shosholoza" (US); "Intruder" (Canada)
- Released: November 1980
- Recorded: 1979
- Genre: Art rock; funk rock
- Length: 4:42 (album version); 3:23 (US single version); 3:39 (Canada single version)
- Label: Charisma (UK); Geffen (North America); Mercury (original US LP pressing)
- Songwriter: Peter Gabriel
- Producer: Steve Lillywhite

Peter Gabriel singles chronology
"Biko" (1980)	"I Don't Remember" (1980)	"Shock the Monkey" (1982)

"I Don't Remember (Live)"

Single by Peter Gabriel

from the album Plays Live
- Released: June 1983
- Recorded: December 1982
- Length: 4:55
- Label: Charisma
- Songwriter: Peter Gabriel
- Producers: Peter Gabriel; Peter Walsh

Peter Gabriel singles chronology
"Wallflower" (1982)	"I Don't Remember (Live)" (1983)	"Walk Through the Fire" (1984)

"I Don't Remember" is a song written and recorded by the English rock musician Peter Gabriel, released as the fourth and final single from his third eponymous studio album in 1980. Although originally only released as an A-side single in the United States and Canada, a live version released with the album Plays Live (1983) reached No. 62 on the UK singles chart and remained in the Top 75 in Britain for 4 weeks. The song was included in Gabriel's compilation album Shaking the Tree (1990) and two different versions were included on Flotsam and Jetsam (2019).

== Background and recording ==
=== Original version ===
Early iterations of "I Don't Remember" were performed by Gabriel on the tour to promote his second eponymous studio album (a.k.a. "Scratch"). In the spring of 1979, the song was also performed with Kate Bush at a memorial concert in Dorset for Bill Duffield, Bush's former lighting engineer who died from injuries sustained from a fall during her first tour. Gabriel built the demo of "I Don't Remember" around a programmable PAiA rhythm box. The basic tracks for the first studio recording of the song were laid down by Gabriel and his backing band at Trident Studios, London during a day off on the "Scratch" tour in 1978, co-produced by Stephen W. Tayler. This song was recorded in August during the same session as "Not One of Us", "Games Without Frontiers", and "Family Snapshot". A week later, work on "I Don't Remember" continued at Atlantic Studios in New York on tour, where overdubs were done including Robert Fripp's guitar, followed by vocals and mixing at Paragon Studios in Chicago.

The early studio version of "I Don't Remember" was originally planned to be released as the A-side of the first single from the album in Europe and Japan, however a Charisma Records executive thought the guitar solos were not radio-friendly. This version was later relegated to the B-side of the single "Games Without Frontiers" from Peter Gabriel (3: Melt) in those territories. Another take of the song was recorded in September 1978 with the lineup minus Fripp, although this version went unused.

=== Album version ===
"I Don't Remember" was re-recorded for Gabriel's third self-titled album, released in 1980. On the album, this version segues out of an instrumental composition titled "Start" and begins with three snare drum hits that lead into a rock groove with rhythmic emphasis on the backbeat. The intro consists of nonsensical wordless voices, a vocal approach that Gabriel later dubbed "Gabrielese". These voices drop out before the first verse, where Gabriel alternates between his midrange and higher register. According to author Durrell Bowman, the lyrics relate to a "resigned amnesiac individual".

On 16 October 1979, Dave Gregory of XTC overdubbed some rhythm guitar on "I Don't Remember". Gregory had previously encouraged Steve Lillywhite to accept Gabriel's request to produce his third eponymous album and offered to record some guitar if Lillywhite agreed to Gabriel's offer. Lillywhite subsequently contacted Gregory to work with Gabriel in the studio to record a "wiry rhythm guitar sound." After arriving ninety minutes late to the studio, Gregory worked with Gabriel to find suitable chords and tunings. Gabriel suggested some parts on his piano, which Gregory recreated by playing the open strings of his 1963 Fender Stratocaster guitar, which was sent through a Roland JC-120 amplifier with a chorus effect and stereo panning. During this point of the recording process, the song consisted of Jerry Marotta's drums, Tony Levin's Chapman stick, and some electronic effects from Larry Fast. Gregory added some power chords to the chorus of the rhythm track with a 1963 Gibson ES-335 in standard tuning, which was connected to a Fender Tremolux amp.

The song made pioneering use of the Fairlight CMI, using samples of glass milk bottles being smashed and bricks being banged. These sounds appear during the fade-out of the recording and were overdubbed after the completion of the basic tracks. "I Don't Remember" was one of the first songs to utilise the Fairlight and Gabriel later established the company Syco Systems with Stephen Paine to import and distribute these devices in the UK.

=== Live version ===
A slightly sped-up live recording from Plays Live was released as a single on 4 July 1983. This version was co-produced by Gabriel and Peter Walsh at Shabbey Road Studios in Caerphilly. In addition to the increased tempo, the single version also featured quieter crowd noises and an extended outro compared to the recording found on Plays Live. Its accompanying music video was directed by Marcello Anciano and produced by Eric Fellner. The music video features footage of Gabriel navigating through a room with naked individuals. During one of the scenes, Gabriel dusts off a childhood photo from the 1950s, which is later smashed at the end of the music video.

== Track listing ==
=== 12" US/Canada single (1980) ===
1. "I Don't Remember" – 5:56
2. "Shosholoza" – 5:19
3. "Biko (remixed version)" – 8:58
4. "Jetzt Kommt die Flut (Here Comes the Flood)" – 4:57

=== 7" US single (1980) ===
1. "I Don't Remember" – 3:23
2. "Shosholoza" – 5:22

=== 7" Canada single (1980) ===
1. "I Don't Remember" – 3:39
2. "Eindringling (Intruder)" – 5:00

=== Live version ===
==== 7" UK single (1983) ====
1. "I Don't Remember" – 4:58
2. "Solsbury Hill" – 4:43
3. "Kiss of Life" – 5:12

==== 12" UK single (1983) ====
1. "I Don't Remember" – 4:58
2. "Solsbury Hill" – 4:43
3. "Kiss of Life" – 5:12
4. "Games Without Frontiers" – 3:27
5. "Family Snapshot" – 4:57

== Personnel ==
- Peter Gabriel — vocals, piano, synthesizer
- Larry Fast — processing
- David Rhodes – guitar, backing vocals
- Robert Fripp – electric guitar
- Dave Gregory — electric guitar
- Tony Levin – Chapman Stick
- Jerry Marotta — drums

== Charts ==
Chart (1980)	Peak position
US Billboard Bubbling Under The Hot 100	107

Chart (1983)	Peak position
UK Singles (Official Charts Company)	62

== Cover versions ==
- English singer Kate Bush sang the song with Peter Gabriel on 12 May 1979, at a memorial concert at the Hammersmith Odeon for Bill Duffield, a lighting director who died during Bush's 'Tour of Life' tour.
- Scottish-American singer and musician David Byrne recorded a cover for Gabriel's 2013 compilation album And I'll Scratch Yours, mixed by Peter Dillett and released on iTunes on 26 June 2010. Byrne opted to give the arrangement a "clubby treatment" upon listening to the original version's tempo and groove, further adding that he "thought the falsetto vocal and club groove would make the alienation and amnesia subject pleasant — almost desirable. I thought my version might imply a willing sublime surrender to memory loss."
