= WALL-E (disambiguation) =

WALL-E is a 2008 American animated film.

WALL-E may also refer to:

- WALL-E (character), the title character of the film
- WALL-E (soundtrack), the soundtrack to the film
- WALL-E (video game), a video game based on the film
