= MSN Music =

Part of MSN's web services, 2001 – 2008

- MSN Music logo, circa 2008
- Website type: Music website
- Available in: English
- Owner: Microsoft
- Website: music.msn.com (archived)
- Launched: April 4, 2001; 25 years ago
- Current status: Inactive

MSN Music was a part of MSN's web services. It delivered music news, music videos, spotlights on new music, artist information, and live performances of artists, as well as Internet radio streams. The website also served as a digital music store from 2004 to 2008. The website launched in April 2001 at music.msn.com. Prior to launching MSN Music, Microsoft acquired MongoMusic on September 13, 2000, and merged its technology.

After the shut down of the MSN Music Store, MSN's music section nonetheless remained online after 2008, hosting content such as music blogs and photo galleries, and it continued to be referred to as "MSN Music" until it was folded into MSN's Entertainment section as part of MSN's 2014 website redesign.

== Music Store ==
Microsoft created an MSN Music download store to compete with Apple's iTunes Music Store, launching it on 1 September 2004, though its sales in comparison were negligible. The store used Microsoft's Windows Media Player application and proprietary Windows Media Format files (protected .wma files). It started out with 500,000 songs.

As of November 14, 2006, MSN Music ceased music sales and redirected visitors to the websites of Microsoft's newly-launched Zune or to Real Rhapsody. The MSN Music store used Microsoft PlaysForSure for digital rights management and was not compatible with Microsoft's own Zune music player.

When announcing the closing of MSN Music in the United States, Microsoft promised users that license servers would be maintained for five years but in April 2008, Microsoft announced that the DRM servers for MSN Music would be deactivated at the end of 2008. After that, it would no longer be possible to reauthorize purchased songs when changing computers or operating systems. They suggested that customers back-up their music by burning it to CD. They later relented, and committed to keeping the DRM servers online through the end of 2011.

After MSN Music downloads ceased in the U.S., DRM-protected downloads were still available in the UK via the MSN UK portal and/or through Windows Media Player for some time, although that service was powered by Nokia (formerly OD2).
