= Rated PG (album) =

Compilation album by Peter Gabriel
- Released: 13 April 2019
- Genre: Rock; pop; worldbeat
- Length: 49:49
- Label: Real World; Virgin EMI; Republic
- Producer: Bob Ezrin; Peter Gabriel; Thomas Newman; George Acogny; David Bottrill; Nile Rodgers; Daniel Lanois

Peter Gabriel chronology
Growing Up Live (2019)	Rated PG (2019)	Flotsam and Jetsam (2019)

Rated PG is a compilation album of songs for film soundtracks by English rock musician Peter Gabriel. The track selection spans over 30 years of music created for the individual films, with "Walk Through the Fire" from 1984 being the earliest and "Everybird" from 2017 being the most recent.

== Content ==
The album includes many unreleased tracks, some of which are alternate versions of previously released songs. The previously unreleased songs in any form outside of their respective films are "Everybird", "Speak (Bol)", and "Nocturnal".

== Release ==
Originally only released on limited-edition vinyl on Record Store Day (13 April 2019) through Real World, it eventually became available on digital streaming services later that month to accommodate demand. A digital single, "This is Party Man", was released before the album. It is a new version of the song and features new lyrics from Peter Gabriel. A video for "Everybird" was released on 12 July 2019 featuring footage from the animated film for which it was originally created. In May 2020 it was announced that the album would be made available for general release on vinyl and CD on 12 June 2020.

== Critical reception ==
Professional ratings
Aggregate scores
Source	Rating
Metacritic	76/100
Review scores
Source	Rating
AllMusic	3/5 stars
Amarok Magazine	3.8/5 stars
Associated Press	Favourable
Louder	3.5/5 stars

Cyrille Delanlssays of Amarok Magazine wrote, "without being essential, Rated PG is an uneven but exciting album in the journey it offers."

== Track listing ==
All tracks are written by Peter Gabriel, except where noted.

No.	Title	Film	Length
1.	"That'll Do" (Written by Randy Newman)	Babe: Pig in the City	3:56
2.	"Down to Earth" (Lyrics by Peter Gabriel, music by Peter Gabriel and Thomas Newman)	WALL-E	5:58
3.	"This is Party Man" (Written by Peter Gabriel, George Acogny and Tori Amos)	Virtuosity	6:36
4.	"The Book of Love" (Written by Stephin Merritt)	Shall We Dance?	3:38
5.	"Taboo" (Written by Peter Gabriel and Nusrat Fateh Ali Khan)	Natural Born Killers	5:47
6.	"Everybird"	Birds Like Us	4:24
7.	"Walk Through the Fire"	Against All Odds	4:03
8.	"Speak (Bol)"	The Reluctant Fundamentalist	6:33
9.	"Nocturnal"	Les Morsures de l'Aube	3:47
10.	"In Your Eyes"	Say Anything...	5:07

== Omissions ==
Peter Gabriel songs from film soundtracks that are not included on this compilation, Hit or Flotsam and Jetsam:

- "Out/Out" from Gremlins (1984)
- "While The Earth Sleeps" (Deep Forest & Peter Gabriel) from Strange Days (1995)
- "Shaking the Tree (02 remix)" (Peter Gabriel & Youssou N'Dour with Shaggy) from The Wild Thornberrys Movie (2002).
- "Why Don't You Show Yourself" from Words With Gods (2014)

It furthermore does not include any material from Gabriel's scores for Birdy, The Last Temptation of Christ, and Rabbit-Proof Fence, each of which had previously been released as albums. See Peter Gabriel discography for full list of songs from film soundtracks.

== Personnel ==
- Peter Gabriel – vocals, production (2–10), arrangement (4)
- Paddy Moloney – vocals (1)
- Black Dyke Mills Band – brass (1)
- Soweto Gospel Choir – vocals (2)
- The Worldbeaters (3)
- Atif Aslam – vocals (8), Urdu vocal arrangement (8)

=== Technical personnel ===
- Bob Ezrin – production (1, 4)
- Thomas Newman – L.A. Sessions production (2)
- Richard Chappell – recording (2), engineering (3, 4, 8, 9), mixing (6)
- Mat Arnold – recording assistance (2)
- Tchad Blake – mixing (2)
- George Acogny – production (3)
- Rod Beale – engineering (3)
- Nick Ingman – orchestration (4)
- Peter Sené – engineering assistance (4)
- David Bottrill – production (5)
- Nile Rodgers – production (7)
- Glenn Tommey – engineering (7)
- Richard Evans – engineering (9), mixing (9)
- Daniel Lanois – production (10), engineering (10)
- Kevin Killen – engineering (10)

== Charts ==
Chart performance for Rated PG
Chart (2019–2020)	Peak position
Belgian Albums (Ultratop Wallonia)	103
German Albums (Offizielle Top 100)	97
Scottish Albums (OCC)	23
Swiss Albums (Schweizer Hitparade)	37
