= Against All Odds (soundtrack) =

1984 soundtrack album by various artists

Soundtrack album by Various artists
- Released: March 1984
- Genre: Rock
- Labels: Virgin (UK & Éire); Atlantic (Rest of the free world)

Singles from Against All Odds
- 1. "Against All Odds (Take a Look at Me Now)" Released: February 1984; 2. "Walk Through the Fire" Released: May 1984; 3. "My Male Curiosity" Released: June 1984

Professional ratings
Review scores
Source	Rating
AllMusic	3/5 stars

Against All Odds: Music from the Original Motion Picture Soundtrack is the soundtrack for the 1984 film Against All Odds.

The album includes the original score by Michel Colombier and Larry Carlton, as well as several tracks by artists popular at the time of the film's release. Best known of the tracks is "Against All Odds (Take a Look at Me Now)", a Phil Collins single which topped the Billboard Hot 100 song chart and became Collins's first American number one song. It gave him a Grammy Award for Best Pop Vocal Performance, Male and another nomination for Song of the Year. The song received an Academy Award nomination for Best Original Song as well as a Golden Globe Award nomination for Best Original Song.

Other prior and current members of Genesis, guitarist Mike Rutherford and former lead vocalist Peter Gabriel, also contribute tracks. The album received a Grammy Award nomination for Best Album of Original Score Written for a Motion Picture or a Television Special in 1985.

== Track listing ==
Side one
No.	Title	Writer(s)	Producer(s)	Length
1.	"Against All Odds (Take a Look at Me Now)" (performed by Phil Collins)	Phil Collins	Arif Mardin	3:23
2.	"Violet and Blue" (performed by Stevie Nicks)	Stevie Nicks	Jimmy Iovine	5:03
3.	"Walk Through the Fire" (performed by Peter Gabriel)	Peter Gabriel	Peter Gabriel	3:59
4.	"Balcony" (performed by Big Country)	Stuart Adamson	Chris Thomas	3:56
5.	"Making a Big Mistake" (performed by Mike Rutherford)	Mike Rutherford	Mike Rutherford	3:45
6.	"My Male Curiosity" (performed by Kid Creole & The Coconuts)	August Darnell	August Darnell	4:39

Side two
No.	Title	Writer(s)	Producer(s)	Length
7.	"The Search (Main Title Theme)" (performed by Larry Carlton & Michel Colombier)	Michel Colombier	Larry Carlton, Michel Colombier	3:33
8.	"El Solitario" (performed by Michel Colombier & Larry Carlton)	Michel Colombier	Michel Colombier	2:34
9.	"Rock and Roll Jaguar" (performed by Larry Carlton & Michel Colombier)	Michel Colombier	Larry Carlton, Michel Colombier	2:17
10.	"For Love Alone" (performed by Larry Carlton)	Larry Carlton	Larry Carlton	3:00
11.	"The Race" (performed by Larry Carlton)	Larry Carlton	Larry Carlton	2:36
12.	"Murder of a Friend" (performed by Larry Carlton & Michel Colombier)	Michel Colombier	Michel Colombier	6:11

== Charts ==
=== Weekly charts ===
Chart (1984)	Peak position
Australia (Kent Music Report)	33
Austrian Albums (Ö3 Austria)	20
Canada Top Albums/CDs (RPM)	8
Dutch Albums (Album Top 100)	40
German Albums (Offizielle Top 100)	24
New Zealand Albums (RMNZ)	39
Swedish Albums (Sverigetopplistan)	42
Swiss Albums (Schweizer Hitparade)	13
UK Albums (Official Charts)	29
US Billboard 200	12

=== Year-end charts ===
Chart (1984)	Position
Canada Top Albums/CDs (RPM)	43
