= Flotsam and Jetsam (Peter Gabriel album) =

Compilation album by Peter Gabriel
- Released: 13 September 2019
- Recorded: 1976–2016
- Length: 356:59
- Labels: Real World; Virgin EMI; Republic

Peter Gabriel chronology
Rated PG (2019)	Flotsam and Jetsam (2019)	I/O (2023)

Flotsam and Jetsam is a compilation album of B-sides, remixes and rarities by English rock musician Peter Gabriel. It was released on 13 September 2019 in digital stores and on streaming services only.

== Track listing ==
Disc 1: 1976–1985
No.	Title	Source	Length
1.	"Strawberry Fields Forever"	All This and World War II soundtrack (1976)	2:33
2.	"Slowburn" (Extended Version)	original version on Peter Gabriel (1977)	5:16
3.	"Perspective" (Single Version)	"D.I.Y." single (1978)	5:07
4.	"D.I.Y." (Re-recorded Single Version)	"D.I.Y." single (1978)	2:53
5.	"Teddy Bear"	"D.I.Y." single (1978)	2:17
6.	"Mother of Violence" (Single Mix)	"D.I.Y." single (1978)	3:15
7.	"Solsbury Hill" (Live at The Bottom Line)	Fanclub flexi disc (1978)	5:11
8.	"I Don't Remember" (Alternate Version)	"Games Without Frontiers" single (1980)	3:26
9.	"Biko" (Remixed Version)	"I Don't Remember" single (1980)	9:00
10.	"Shosholoza"	"Biko" single (1980)	5:19
11.	"Jetzt kommt die Flut"	"Biko" single (1980)	4:58
12.	"Soft Dog"	"Shock the Monkey" single (1982)	4:14
13.	"Shock the Monkey" (Instrumental)	"Shock the Monkey" single (1982)	5:51
14.	"Across the River"	"I Have the Touch" single (1982)	7:02
15.	"Kiss of Life" (Live)	"Solsbury Hill (live)" Dutch single (1983)	5:12
16.	"I Don't Remember" (Live Single Version)	"I Don't Remember" single (1983)	4:55
Total length:			1:16:29

Disc 2: 1986–1993
No.	Title	Source	Length
1.	"I Have the Touch" (1985 Remix)	"Sledgehammer" single (1986)	5:11
2.	"Sledgehammer" (Dance Mix)	"Sledgehammer" single (1986)	7:28
3.	"Sledgehammer" (Extended)	"Sledgehammer" single (1986)	5:38
4.	"Don’t Break This Rhythm" (Full Version)	Previously unreleased. Edited version released on "Sledgehammer" single (1986)	6:09
5.	"In Your Eyes" (Single Mix)	"In Your Eyes" US single (1986)	6:20
6.	"In Your Eyes" (Special remix)	"Don’t Give Up" single (1986)	7:18
7.	"Big Time" (Extended Version)	"Big Time" single (1987)	6:14
8.	"Curtains"	"Big Time" single (1987)	3:29
9.	"GA GA" (I Go Swimming Instrumental)	"Red Rain" single (1987)	4:33
10.	"Walk Through the Fire" (Single Mix)	"Red Rain" single (1987)	3:34
11.	"Biko" (Live)	"Biko" single (1987)	6:31
12.	"Digging in the Dirt" (Raw Stylus Mix)	"Digging in the Dirt" single (1992)	7:23
13.	"Digging in the Dirt" (Instrumental)	"Digging in the Dirt" single (1992)	5:12
14.	"Quiet Steam"	"Digging in the Dirt" single (1992)	6:27
15.	"Bashi-Bazouk"	"Digging in the Dirt" single (1992)	4:48
16.	"Games Without Frontiers" (Massive/DB Mix)	"Steam" single (1993)	5:20
17.	"Steam" (Oh, Oh, Let Off Steam Mix)	"Steam" single (1993)	6:43
18.	"Steam" (Oh, Oh, Let Off Steam Mix Dub)	"Steam" single (1993)	5:47
19.	"Mercy Street" (William Orbit Mix)	"Blood of Eden" single (1993)	7:56
20.	"Blood of Eden" (Special Mix for Wim Wenders’ Until the End of the World)	"Blood of Eden" single (1993)	6:43
21.	"Digging in the Dirt" (Rich E Mix)	"Kiss That Frog" single (1993)	7:28
22.	"Kiss That Frog" (Mindblender Mix)	"Kiss That Frog" single (1993)	6:46
23.	"Shaking the Tree" (Bottrill Remix)	"Kiss That Frog" single (1993)	5:54
Total length:			2:18:52

Disc 3: 1994–2016
No.	Title	Source	Length
1.	"Summertime"	The Glory of Gershwin (1994)	3:49
2.	"Suzanne"	Tower of Song: The Songs of Leonard Cohen (1995)	5:13
3.	"I Have the Touch" (Robbie Robertson Mix)	Phenomenon soundtrack (1996)	5:30
4.	"In the Sun"	Diana, Princess of Wales: Tribute (1997)	6:44
5.	"Shaking the Tree 97" (Jungle Version)	Jungle 2 Jungle soundtrack (1997)	5:38
6.	"I Grieve" (City of Angels Version)	City of Angels soundtrack (1998)	8:12
7.	"The Tower That Ate People" (Red Planet Remix)	Red Planet soundtrack (2000)	6:28
8.	"Animal Nation"	The Wild Thornberrys Movie soundtrack (2002)	7:22
9.	"Signal to Noise" (Gangs of New York Version)	Gangs of New York soundtrack (2002)	7:39
10.	"More Than This" (The Polyphonic Spree Mix)	"More Than This" single (2002)	5:08
11.	"More Than This" (Elbow Mix)	"More Than This" single (2002)	5:05
12.	"My Head Sounds Like That" (Röyksopp Remix)	"More Than This" & "The Barry Williams Show" singles (2002)	8:24
13.	"Sky Blue" (Martyn Bennett Remix)	"More Than This" single (2002)	5:19
14.	"Growing Up" (Trent Reznor Remix)	"Growing Up" single (2003)	6:31
15.	"Growing Up" (Stabilizer Remix)	"Growing Up" single (2003)	4:51
16.	"Growing Up" (Tricky Instrumental Mix)	"Growing Up" single (2003)	1:32
17.	"Darkness" (Engelspost Remix)	"Burn You Up, Burn You Down" single (2003)	14:09
18.	"Curtains" (Broad Mix)	Uscita (2004)	5:59
19.	"Father, Son" (Daniel Lanois & Richard Chappell Mix)	Uscita (2004)	4:39
20.	"Courage"	Previously unreleased full version. Original unfinished version first released on the So 25th Anniversary Boxset. Overdubbed for digital single release (2013)	4:36
21.	"Courage" (The Hexidecimal Mix)	"Courage" digital single (2013)	5:26
22.	"I'm Amazing"	Digital single (2016)	7:33
23.	"The Veil"	Snowden soundtrack (2016)	5:51
Total length:			2:21:38 (5:56:59)

== Omissions ==
Notable non-album tracks missing from this compilation include:

- "Out Out" (from Gremlins, 1984)
- "No More Apartheid" (Artists United Against Apartheid, from Sun City, 1985)
- "Lovetown" (from Philadelphia, 1993, although it appears on Hit)
- "While the Earth Sleeps" (Deep Forest with Peter Gabriel, from Strange Days, 1995)
- "Seven Zero" (from Real World CD-Extra #2, 1996)
- "Why Don't You Show Yourself" from Words With Gods (2014)
