= I Have the Touch =

1982 song performed by Peter Gabriel

Single by Peter Gabriel

from the album Peter Gabriel (Security)
- B-side: "Across the River"
- Released: 10 December 1982
- Recorded: 1981–1982
- Genre: Synth-pop; new wave; funk
- Length: 4:30 (album version); 3:45 (1982 single edit); 3:48 ('85 Remix); 5:08 (extended '85 Remix); 4:19 (1996 Robbie Robertson mix)
- Label: Charisma (UK); Geffen (US)
- Songwriter: Peter Gabriel
- Producers: David Lord; Peter Gabriel

Peter Gabriel singles chronology
"Shock the Monkey" (1982)	"I Have the Touch" (1982)	"Wallflower" (1982)

Official audio
- "I Have the Touch" on YouTube

"I Have the Touch" is a song by the English rock musician Peter Gabriel from his fourth eponymous studio album released in 1982. The song's working title during the recording sessions was "Hands". This song was featured in the American drama film The Chocolate War (1988). The 1996 remix was used in the film Phenomenon of the same year.

In 1996, the Bermudian singer-songwriter Heather Nova recorded a cover version of the song for the teen supernatural horror film The Craft. It was also featured in the 2025 film Marty Supreme, starring Timothée Chalamet.

== Background ==
Musically, "I Have the Touch" is built around a drum machine pattern and various synthesisers, including a Prophet-5 played by Larry Fast. In addition to the Linn LM-1 programming provided by Gabriel, Jerry Marotta also recorded some acoustic drums for the song, which were treated with gated reverb. To achieve some of the guitar tones on "I Have the Touch", David Rhodes tapped some B chords on the twelfth fret of his guitar.

The lyrics of "I Have the Touch" deal with the desire for human contact, which Gabriel thematically explored after reading about the importance of touch, citing an example of how various degrees of physical contact can influence newborn brain development. He cited the literary work of Michael Argyle on body language and brain stimulation as inspiration for "I Have the Touch", further referencing an experiment conducted in capital cities observing different forms of body contact.

During the penultimate lines of each verse, the vocals reach the highest note, after which the tension releases at the title line: 'I have the touch'. At the end of the song, Gabriel lists off several activities that he believes are insufficient to human contact, including arm folding, scratching, and finger tapping. A German re-recording, titled "Kon Takt!", was included on the Deutsches Album. This version features an added refrain with shouted gibberish.

== Release ==
Record Business announced the release of "I Have the Touch" in its 29 November 1982 edition of the publication. The single was released by Charisma Records in the United Kingdom with a picture sleeve. The single edit of "I Have the Touch" was a remix of the version found on Gabriel's fourth solo album. The B-side of the single, "Across the River", came from a session between Gabriel, Rhodes, Stewart Copeland, L. Shankar. "Across the River" had been recorded for the WOMAD benefit album, Music and Rhythm, which had been released earlier that year. Gabriel created the chord progression of "Across the River" the night prior to the recording session and mixed the song the following day. The cover art for the single is a still frame from the "Shock the Monkey" music video.

In the UK, "I Have the Touch" peaked at No. 105 on the Bubbling Under portion of the Record Business charts and No. 53 on the publication's Top 100 Airplay ranking. The song received airplay on US album-oriented rock stations and reached No. 46 on the Billboard Top Rock Tracks chart in December 1982.

== Versions ==
In 1983, Gabriel and Peter Walsh remixed the track, which was first released as a B-side to the 12" single of "Walk Through the Fire", a non-album track from the motion picture Against All Odds (1984). In 1986, an edited remix of this version was later released on the 12-inch single of "Sledgehammer" credited as the "'85 Remix".,

In 1996, Gabriel remixed "I Have the Touch" with Robbie Robertson for the movie Phenomenon. This version was included on the 2003 compilation album Hit.

== Personnel ==
- Peter Gabriel – lead and backing vocals, Fairlight CMI, Prophet-5, Linn LM-1 programming
- Larry Fast – Prophet-5, Moog synthesizer
- David Rhodes – electric guitar
- Tony Levin – Chapman Stick
- Jerry Marotta – drums
- John Ellis – backing vocals

== Chart performance ==
Chart (1982)	Peak position
US Mainstream Rock (Billboard)	46
