= Walk Through the Fire (song) =

Single by Peter Gabriel

from the album Against All Odds
- Released: May 1984
- Length: 3:59 (soundtrack version); 3:30 (single mix)
- Label: Virgin/Charisma; Atlantic
- Songwriter: Peter Gabriel
- Producers: Peter Gabriel; Nile Rodgers (single remix only)

Peter Gabriel singles chronology
"Solsbury Hill (live)" (1983)	"Walk Through the Fire" (1984)	"Sledgehammer" (1986)

"Walk Through the Fire" is a song written and performed by English rock musician Peter Gabriel for the 1984 film Against All Odds. That same year, the song received a remix produced by Nile Rodgers that was later issued as a single. The song charted in the UK, where it peaked at No. 69.

A few years after its initial release, "Walk Through the Fire" was also included as a B-side on Gabriel's "Red Rain" single in the United States. The single mix was included on Gabriel's 2019 digital compilation album Flotsam and Jetsam album, whereas the original version found on the Against All Odds soundtrack appeared on his Rated PG (album) album, which consisted of ten Gabriel compositions that appeared on film soundtracks.

== Background ==
Taylor Hackford was tasked with finding suitable musicians to contribute material for the film Against All Odds and first contacted Tony Smith, who was Phil Collins' manager to participate. Through Smith, Hackford was later connected with Peter Gabriel, who agreed to submit an unreleased song to the soundtrack. "Walk Through the Fire" had been written during the recording sessions for Gabriel's third solo album, where it was considered for inclusion. Gabriel reworked and completed "Walk Through the Fire" for the Against All Odds soundtrack, where it was also included during a scene with Jeff Bridges in a bar.

"Walk Through the Fire" was serviced to album oriented rock radio stations in the United States during the week of 9 March 1984, where it received 22 adds to stations in that format, including WQBK-FM and WLVQ. A few months later, the song received a remix from Nile Rodgers, which was serviced to radio stations during the week of 4 May 1984. Gabriel's record label had suggested the idea of remixing the song for radio, so Gabriel asked Rodgers to assist with the song's single edit. The two had previously met at a Japanese restaurant where they discussed the production on Gabriel's third studio album. Rodgers commented that he initiated a meeting with Gabriel after he heard his song "Intruder", where he was entranced with the drum sounds on the track, adding "in my whole career I've never sought out an artist, or indeed tracked anyone down. He is the only one."

Virgin/Charisma Records released "Walk Through the Fire" as a physical single in the United Kingdom on 21 May 1984, with Larry Carlton's song "The Race" as the B-side. The twelve-inch single also included a remix of Gabriel's "I Have the Touch". By early June, the song had been added to 14 playlists across the United Kingdom, including BBC Radio 1. It debuted at No. 72 on the UK singles chart for the week dated 2 June 1984. During its third and final week on the UK singles chart, "Walk Through the Fire" peaked at No. 69.

Reflecting on the single, Gabriel said that "it could have been a good song. The ingredients were there but it's not quite right." Rodgers discussed the single's commercial performance, saying "at the time, I thought it was going to be a smash, but it wasn't." He called "Walk Through the Fire" "one of my favorite things ever; I just love that song." Rodgers also collaborated with Gabriel on "Out, Out" for the Gremlins soundtrack and "This is the Picture (Excellent Birds)", a song that Gabriel co-wrote with Laurie Anderson.

== Critical reception ==
Cashbox called "Walk Through the Fire" an "aural masterpiece" with "an apocalyptic lyric surrounded by chaotic jungle percussion." They also said that Gabriel's vocals had captured "the fearful tone of the song", highlighted its "insistent drumming", and predicted that the song would perform on multiple radio formats. Billboard said that the song's "tribal percussion propels Gabriel's eerie vocals." Jerry Smith of Music Week characterised the song as a "complex track mixing vocals and melodic synths", which in his opinion provided it with a "modern but ethnic feel." He also predicted that the song's association with Against All Odds would result in the single receiving "a lot" of radio exposure.

Nick DeRiso of Ultimate Classic Rock felt that the song provided a brief glimpse into the more polished approach to come on 1986's So. Writing for Rolling Stone, Ryan Reed referred to the song as an "obscure gem" from Gabriel's discography that paired "imagistic lyrics with clanking percussion and synth-horn emulations."

== Chart performance ==
Chart (1984)	Peak position
UK Singles (Official Charts)	69
