= Four Kinds of Horses =

Single by Peter Gabriel

from the album I/O
- Released: 5 May 2023 (bright-side mix); 19 May 2023 (dark-side and in-side mixes)
- Studio: Real World (Wiltshire); The Beehive (London); British Grove (London); Copper House (London)
- Length: 6:47
- Label: Real World; EMI (UK/Japan); Republic (US/Canada)
- Songwriter: Peter Gabriel
- Producers: Peter Gabriel; Richard Russell

Peter Gabriel singles chronology
"I/O" (2023)	"Four Kinds of Horses" (2023)	"Road to Joy" (2023)

"Four Kinds of Horses" is a song by English musician Peter Gabriel, released in May 2023 as the fifth single in promotion of his tenth studio album I/O. The track has been described by Rolling Stone as atmospheric, swirling, and sparkling. The cover artwork was done by Cornelia Parker. Gabriel also performed the song in 2023 for his I/O concert tour

== Background ==
The song was originally conceived in 2015 when the founder of XL Recordings, Richard Russell, asked Peter Gabriel to make a song for his project "Everything Is Recorded". Russell had invited Gabriel to his recording studio to work on some ideas for the project. While in the studio, Gabriel came up with some chords, melodies and words on top of a groove he was working on with Russell, which would later become "Four Kinds of Horses".

Gabriel said that the song "didn't altogether work" at this stage, in part because he was dissatisfied with the chorus, so he temporarily shelved the song. He had also felt that Russell's rhythm track was unsuitable with the direction that he wanted to take the song in. Gabriel later reworked the song with Katie May and placed particular attention on the song's groove and chorus. He tried between three and four different ideas before settling on some parts that he was pleased with, ultimately settling on track built upon "triplets, echoes and smaller sounds that suit[ed] this dreamy mood".

The Buddhist Parable of Four Kinds of Horses, which explain how a student can approach religious and spiritual practice, served as one of the influences for the song. "Four Kinds of Horses" also has themes of the "overlap of religion and peace on the one hand and violence and terrorism on the other." Gabriel took further inspiration from a plotline in the film Paradise Now by Hany Abu-Assad where two characters receive training to commit a terrorist act, which also explored the mindsets of these individuals during their preparations.

The track also features Brian Eno, who previously worked with Gabriel on 1992's Us. Gabriel believed that Eno's synthesisers sounded like electric worms and felt that they "would make a great three dimensional wall paper of sound", so Gabriel asked Eno to create eleven additional similar-sounding parts. John Metcalfe contributed string arrangements and Gabriel's daughter Melanie sang backing vocals.

== Critical reception ==
In his review for i/o, Alexis Petridis identified "Four Kind of Horses" as a song that demonstrated Gabriel's lyrical approach to topics surrounding religious fundamentalism and right-wing populism, saying that he tackled these topics "from the vantage point of someone who's been around a long time." Chris Roberts of Record Collector highlighted the "gorgeous lull" found in the middle of the song and its "bass and string stabs." Writing for The Observer, Damien Morris labelled "Four Kinds of Horses" as the best song on i/o. John Lewis of Uncut characterised the song as "a celebration of spiritual wisdom, set to twinkly, horror-movie tubular bells and a gothic beat."

== Personnel ==
- Peter Gabriel – vocals, backing vocals, piano, synths, rhythm programming, percussion
- David Rhodes – guitars, backing vocals
- Tony Levin – basses
- Melanie Gabriel – backing vocals
- Brian Eno – rhythm progressing, synthesizers, electric worms
- Katie May – rhythm programming
- Richard Russell – filtered percussion

Orchestra

- Orchestral arrangement: John Metcalfe
- Violins: Everton Nelson, Ian Humphries, Louisa Fuller, Charles Mutter, Cathy Thompson, Natalia Bonner, *Richard George, Marianne Haynes, Martin Burgess, Clare Hayes, Debbie Widdup, and Odile Ollagnon
- Violas: Bruce White, Fiona Bonds, Peter Lale, and Rachel Roberts
- Cellos: Ian Burdge, Chris Worsey, Caroline Dale, William Schofield, Tony Woollard, and Chris Allan
- Double bass: Chris Laurence, Stacy Watton, and Lucy Shaw
- French horn: David Pyatt
- Tenor trombone: Andy Wood and Tracy Holloway
- Bass trombone: Richard Henry
- Tuba: David Powell
- Orchestra conductor: John Metcalfe
- Orchestra leader: Everton Nelson
- Sheet music supervisor: Dave Foster
- Orchestra contractor: Lucy Whalley and Susie Gillis

== Charts ==
Chart performance for "Four Kinds of Horses"
Chart (2023)	Peak position
UK Singles Downloads (Official Charts)	65
