= Down to Earth (Peter Gabriel song) =

Single by Peter Gabriel featuring The Soweto Gospel Choir

from the album WALL-E: An Original Walt Disney Records Soundtrack
- Released: June 10, 2008
- Recorded: 2008
- Genre: Pop rock; art pop; gospel; progressive soul; electronic rock; worldbeat; film score
- Length: 5:58
- Label: Walt Disney; Real World
- Songwriters: Peter Gabriel (music and lyrics); Thomas Newman (music)

Peter Gabriel singles chronology
"Burn You Up, Burn You Down (Big Blue Ball Version)" (2008)	"Down to Earth" (2008)	"The Book of Love" / "Not One of Us" (2010)

"Down to Earth" is a song co-written and performed by English rock musician Peter Gabriel for the 2008 animated Disney-Pixar film WALL-E. It was released on June 10, 2008, by Walt Disney Records and Real World Records. Composed by Gabriel and Thomas Newman, with additional vocals from the Soweto Gospel Choir, the song is the 37th track on the soundtrack album to WALL-E, in which it is featured over the end credits.

== Background ==
Andrew Stanton, who served as the director of WALL-E, was a fan of Gabriel's work and approached him to contribute a song for the soundtrack. Gabriel collaborated with Thomas Newman, who supplied the melody of the song, while Gabriel worked on the song's lyrics and instrumentation. Two instrumental compositions on the soundtrack, "Eve" and "Define Dancing", were also co-written by Gabriel.

"As a kid I loved animation, so I'm a huge Pixar fan," Gabriel explained to Mark Blake. "I have seen WALL-E many times as I have young children. It was also great to work with the scorer Thomas Newman... He wrote the best TV theme tune ever: for Six Feet Under."

"Down to Earth" consists of gentle piano-driven verses with more upbeat choruses, both of which are adorned with various electronic textures. The Soweto Gospel Choir appears on the song's bridge and outro. The song was engineered by Richard Chappell and mixed by Tchad Blake.

The song saw release as a promotional single for the Pixar animated feature film WALL-E. In 2019, the song was included on Gabriel's Rated PG album, which consisted of ten songs written by Gabriel that were used in film scores.

== Awards ==
"Down to Earth" was nominated for the Best Original Song Award at the Golden Globes as well as the Best Original Song award at the 81st Academy Awards. It won the Grammy Award for Best Song Written for Motion Picture, Television or Other Visual Media in 2009. Another song from the film co-written by Gabriel titled "Define Dancing" won the Grammy Award for Best Instrumental Arrangement that same year.

Gabriel originally planned to perform "Down to Earth" at the 81st Academy Awards, although he decided against it after learning that he would only be allotted one minute to play the song. He had assumed that the three nominated songs "would be performed in full", but production opted to truncate the length of these performances in an attempt to increase viewership. As such, Gabriel withdrew from the ceremony and John Legend performed the song instead.

=== Accolades ===
Year	Nominee / work	Award	Result
2009	Academy Award	Best Original Song (shared with Thomas Newman)	Nominated
2009	Golden Globes	Best Original Song (shared with Thomas Newman)	Nominated
2009	Grammy Award	Best Song Written Specifically for a Motion Picture or Television (shared with Thomas Newman)	Won

== Chart performance ==
Chart (2008)	Peak
Canadian Singles Chart	73
UK Singles Chart	118
