= OD2 =

First online music download service

On Demand Distribution
- Type: Private
- Industry: Digital music store
- Founded: November 1999; 27 years ago in Bristol, United Kingdom
- Founders: Peter Gabriel; Real World; Mike Large; Charles Grimsdale; Dave Shephard; David Munns
- Defunct: 29 April 2009
- Fate: Acquired in June 2004
- Successors: Loudeye; Nokia
- Headquarters: Bristol, United Kingdom
- Area served: Europe
- Key people: Charles Grimsdale (CEO)
- Brands: O-D2; OD2

On Demand Distribution (OD2) was one of the first online music download services, which existed from 1999 until 2009.

== History ==
On Demand Distribution, short O-D2 or OD2, was founded by English musician Peter Gabriel, Real World, Real World CEO Mike Large and industry executives Charles Grimsdale, Dave Shephard and David Munns in November 1999. The company based their infrastructure on the Windows Media framework.

OD2 launched their service on 24 May 2000 in London, offering downloads from initial independent record companies Mushroom, Mute, V2, Real World, and dance music licensing agency Dynamik-Music the following day.

After OD2 forged partnerships with record labels BMG, EMI, Warner and the Association of Independent Music (AIM), Universal Music licensed its catalogue to OD2 in 2002. That same year, Ministry of Sound used OD2's digital-delivery platform to launch their own subscription service that offered users access to over 50,000 songs that OD2 had licensed from the aforementioned labels.

OD2 was bought by US digital music distributor company Loudeye in June 2004 for $40 million. Loudeye sold its other music distribution business in 2006, making OD2 its principal business. In October 2006 Loudeye was acquired by Finnish company Nokia for $60 million. The service was renamed Nokia Music Store.

Rival digital music distributors included MusicNet, which was used by EMI, AOL/Time Warner, BMG and HMV – the latter of which defected from OD2 in 2005.

On 1 April 2009, OD2 informed all existing customers by e-mail and on the site that it was to close on 29 April 2009 and recommended all customers download Nokia Music.

Prior to its closure in 2009, its technology had been used by over 100 music download sites including MSN Music UK, MyCokeMusic, Planet Internet (KPN), Wanadoo and CD WOW!.

== See also ==
- Online music store
