= WALL-E (soundtrack) =

WALL-E (Original Motion Picture Soundtrack)

Soundtrack album by Thomas Newman
- Released: June 24, 2008
- Recorded: 2007–2008
- Studios: Sony Scoring Stage in Culver City; Newman Scoring Stage in Los Angeles; The Village Studios in Los Angeles; Paramount Scoring Stage M in Los Angeles
- Genres: Film score, soundtrack
- Length: 62:07
- Label: Walt Disney Records
- Producers: Thomas Newman; Bill Bernstein

Thomas Newman chronology
Towelhead (2007)	WALL-E (2008)	Revolutionary Road (2009)

Singles from WALL-E
- 1. "Down to Earth" Released: June 18, 2008

Professional ratings
Review scores
Source	Rating
AllMusic	4/5 stars
Filmtracks	3/5 stars
Movie Music UK	3/5 stars
Movie Wave	4/5 stars
ScoreNotes	7.5/10 stars
SoundtrackNet	3/5 stars

WALL-E (Original Motion Picture Soundtrack) is the soundtrack album to the 2008 Disney-Pixar film of the same name composed and conducted by Thomas Newman. WALL-E is the second Pixar film to be scored by Thomas Newman after Finding Nemo (2003). It was also the second Pixar film not to be scored by Randy Newman or Michael Giacchino. Released by Walt Disney Records on June 24, 2008, it was mainly composed by Thomas Newman, and orchestration is credited to Carl Johnson, JAC Redford, Thomas Pasatieri, and Gary K. Thomas. Newman previously scored Finding Nemo and most of all other Pixar films have been scored by either Newman's cousin Randy, Michael Giacchino, or Patrick Doyle.

The soundtrack features excerpts from "Put on Your Sunday Clothes" and "It Only Takes a Moment" (both sung by Michael Crawford) from the soundtrack to the live-action film Hello, Dolly! as well as an original song, "Down to Earth" by Peter Gabriel. Also featured in the film but not in the soundtrack are the classical pieces "Also Sprach Zarathustra" and "The Blue Danube", both of which are famous for their appearances in 2001: A Space Odyssey (which was one of the big influences of the movie). Neither Etta James's cover of the song "At Last" nor "Aquarela do Brasil", both of which were used in the theatrical trailers, appeared on the final cut of the film or on the soundtrack.

== Track listing ==
All music/tracks are composed and performed by Thomas Newman, except where noted.

WALL-E (Original Motion Picture Soundtrack) track listing
No.	Title	Lyrics	Music	Artist(s)	Length
1.	"Put on Your Sunday Clothes"	Jerry Herman	Herman	Michael Crawford, Danny Lockin	1:17
2.	"2815 A.D."				3:28
3.	"WALL-E"				1:59
4.	"The Spaceship"				1:41
5.	"EVE"				1:02
6.	"Thrust"				0:41
7.	"Bubble Wrap"				0:50
8.	"La Vie en rose"	Édith Piaf, Louiguy, Mack David	Piaf, Louiguy, David	Louis Armstrong And His Orchestra	3:24
9.	"Eye Surgery"				0:40
10.	"Worry Wait"				1:19
11.	"First Date"				1:19
12.	"EVE Retrieve"				2:19
13.	"The Axiom"				2:24
14.	"BNL"	Bill Bernstein			0:20
15.	"Foreign Contaminant"				2:06
16.	"Repair Ward"				2:20
17.	"72 Degrees and Sunny"				3:12
18.	"Typing Bot"				0:47
19.	"Septuacentennial"				0:14
20.	"Gopher"				0:40
21.	"WALL-E's Pod Adventure"				1:13
22.	"Define Dancing"		Newman, Gabriel		2:23
23.	"No Splashing No Diving"				0:47
24.	"All That Love's About"				0:37
25.	"M-O"				0:46
26.	"Directive A-113"				2:05
27.	"Mutiny!"				1:29
28.	"Fixing WALL-E"				2:07
29.	"Rogue Robots"				2:02
30.	"March of the Gels"				0:54
31.	"Tilt"				2:00
32.	"The Holo-Detector"				1:07
33.	"Hyperjump"				1:04
34.	"Desperate EVE"				0:56
35.	"Static"				1:43
36.	"It Only Takes a Moment"	Herman	Herman	Crawford, Marianne McAndrew	1:07
37.	"Down to Earth" (featuring Soweto Gospel Choir)	Newman, Gabriel	Newman, Gabriel	Gabriel, Soweto Gospel Choir	5:58
38.	"Horizon 12.2"				1:27
Total length:					62:07

== Personnel ==
- Original score composed and conducted by Thomas Newman
- Produced by Thomas Newman and Bill Bernstein
- Recorded and mixed by Tommy Vicari at The Village and Paramount Pictures Scoring Stage M
- Orchestra recorded by Armin Steiner at Sony Pictures Scoring Stage and Newman Scoring Stage-Twentieth Century Fox Studios
- Assistant engineers: Greg Hayes, Chris Owens, Shin Miyazawa, Adam Michalak, and Tim Lauber
- Orchestrations by Thomas Pasatieri, J. A. C. Redford
- Additional orchestrations by Gary K. Thomas and Carl Johnson
- Music editor: Bill Bernstein
- Digital audio: Larry Mah
- Music contractor: Leslie Morris
- Vocal contractor: Bobbi Page
- Music preparation: Julian Bratolyubov
- Assistant music editor: Mike Zainer
- Audio coordination: George Doering
- Digital coordination: Ernest Lee
- Sound effects and voice designer: Ben Burtt
- Album mastered by Bernie Grundman at Bernie Grundman Mastering
- Executive music producer: Chris Montan
- Music supervisor: Tom MacDougall
- Music production manager: Andrew Page
- Music business affairs: Donna Cole-Brulé
- Music production coordinator: Ashley Chafin
- Music production assistants: Jill Iverson and Siobhan Sullivan
- Post-production supervisor: Paul Cichocki

== Awards and nominations ==
The soundtrack won two Grammy Awards: Best Song Written for Motion Picture, Television or Other Visual Media for "Down to Earth" and Best Instrumental Arrangement for "Define Dancing". It was also nominated for Best Score Soundtrack Album for Motion Picture, Television or Other Visual Media. In addition, the soundtrack was nominated for two Academy Awards: Best Original Score and Best Original Song for "Down to Earth".
