= Hit (album) =

Greatest hits album by Peter Gabriel
- Released: 3 November 2003
- Recorded: 1977–2003
- Genres: Art rock; pop; worldbeat
- Length: 150:10 (UK); 150:20 (US)
- Label: Real World/Virgin
- Producers: Peter Gabriel; Bob Ezrin; Stephen Hague; Daniel Lanois; Steve Lillywhite; David Lord; Steve Osborne; Karl Wallinger

Peter Gabriel chronology
Up (2002)	Hit (2003)	Big Blue Ball (2008)

Singles from Hit
- 1. "Burn You Up, Burn You Down" Released: 23 December 2003

Professional ratings
Review scores
Source	Rating
AllMusic	4/5 stars
The Rolling Stone Album Guide	3.5/5 stars

Hit, also known as Peter Gabriel: The Definitive Two CD Collection, is a 2003 compilation album of songs by the English rock musician Peter Gabriel. It reached No. 29 on the UK Albums Chart and No. 100 in the US. Disc one is labelled Hit and disc two Miss, reflecting the first disc which comprises Gabriel's best known chart singles and the second featuring his more obscure material.

The two-disc set is different in the UK and US because of the second disc. The second disc in the US spans fourteen songs by Gabriel, whilst the UK second disc features fifteen songs. Only some of these appeared on the US version. The UK version collects at least one track from every studio album by Gabriel, including soundtracks, except for Birdy, which is the only album not represented by a track.

Hit is Gabriel's first compilation album since 1990's Shaking the Tree: Sixteen Golden Greats. With the exception of North America, the album was released internationally on 3 November 2003 to coincide with the release of Gabriel's Growing Up: Live concert film. North America received both the album and the DVD the following day. Joint promotional campaigns were planned for Hit and Growing Up: Live, particularly in magazines and the press.

The album appeared on the Real World Records label, with Geffen Records assisting with distribution in North America and EMI Records handling this responsibility elsewhere. This was the final album slated for Gabriel's contract with Geffen, with EMI's lasting for one more album. On disc 2 of the German-edition of Hit, EMI Germany was responsible for the inclusion of material from Gabriel's two German-language albums, Ein deutsches Album (1980) and Deutsches Album (1982). Gabriel expressed hope that Hit would revitalize sales for his 2002 album Up, even though he believed that "everyone else seems to have given up on it."

== Track listing ==
All songs written by Peter Gabriel, except "Burn You Up, Burn You Down", by Gabriel, Neil Sparkes and Karl Wallinger.

=== Disc one: Hit ===
Standard edition
No.	Title	Original album	Length
1.	"Solsbury Hill"	Peter Gabriel 1 (Car), 1977	4:23
2.	"Shock the Monkey" (single edit)	Peter Gabriel 4 (Security), 1982	3:59
3.	"Sledgehammer" (single edit)	So, 1986	4:59
4.	"Don't Give Up" (edited version)	So	5:55
5.	"Games Without Frontiers" (single edit) (*)	Peter Gabriel 3 (Melt), 1980	3:57
6.	"Big Time"	So	4:28
7.	"Burn You Up, Burn You Down"	Previously unreleased single version, 2003, album version released later on Big Blue Ball, 2008	5:26
8.	"Growing Up" (Tom Lord-Alge mix)	Originally from Up, 2002	4:48
9.	"Digging in the Dirt"	Us, 1992	5:15
10.	"Blood of Eden" (radio edit)	Us	5:06
11.	"More Than This" (radio edit)	Up	4:33
12.	"Biko" (edited version)	Peter Gabriel 3 (Melt)	6:58
13.	"Steam" (**)	Us	6:02
14.	"Red Rain"	So	5:39
15.	"Here Comes the Flood" (1990 version)	Shaking the Tree: Sixteen Golden Greats, 1990; originally from Peter Gabriel 1 (Car)	4:32
Total length:			76:00

*This is the single release with a more radio-friendly repeat of the line "Whistling tunes we're kissing baboons in the jungle" from the first chorus.
**While labelled as the radio edit in the liner notes, "Steam" is actually the same length as its album version.

=== Disc two: Miss ===
UK edition
No.	Title	Original album	Length
1.	"San Jacinto"	Peter Gabriel 4 (Security)	6:31
2.	"No Self Control"	Peter Gabriel 3 (Melt)	3:55
3.	"Cloudless"	Long Walk Home: Music from the Rabbit-Proof Fence, 2002	4:48
4.	"The Rhythm of the Heat"	Peter Gabriel 4 (Security), 1982	5:18
5.	"I Have the Touch" (Robbie Robertson mix) (*)	Phenomenon soundtrack, 1996; originally from Peter Gabriel 4 (Security)	4:19
6.	"I Grieve"	Up	7:24
7.	"D.I.Y"	Peter Gabriel 2 (Scratch), 1978	2:38
8.	"A Different Drum"	Passion: Music for The Last Temptation of Christ, 1989	4:47
9.	"The Drop"	Up	3:02
10.	"The Tower That Ate People" (Steve Osborne mix) (*)	Soundtrack from Red Planet, 2000	4:06
11.	"Lovetown"	Soundtrack from Philadelphia, 1993	5:23
12.	"Father, Son"	OVO, 2000	4:58
13.	"Signal to Noise"	Up	7:35
14.	"Downside Up" (live)	previously unreleased, originally from OVO	5:32
15.	"Washing of the Water"	Us	3:54
Total length:			74:10 (2:30:10)

*These versions have been shortened as compared with the versions on the original soundtracks, the full length versions appear on Flotsam and Jetsam.

US edition
No.	Title	Original album	Length
1.	"San Jacinto"	Peter Gabriel 4 (Security)	6:31
2.	"I Don't Remember"	Peter Gabriel 3 (Melt)	4:32
3.	"The Rhythm of the Heat"	Peter Gabriel 4 (Security)	5:19
4.	"Love to Be Loved"	Us	5:17
5.	"I Grieve"	Up	7:25
6.	"Family Snapshot"	Peter Gabriel 3 (Melt)	4:29
7.	"In Your Eyes"	So	5:29
8.	"The Drop"	Up	3:04
9.	"The Tower That Ate People" (Steve Osborne mix)	Soundtrack from Red Planet, 2000	4:04
10.	"Lovetown"	Soundtrack from Philadelphia, 1993	5:21
11.	"Father, Son"	OVO	4:55
12.	"Signal to Noise"	Up	7:33
13.	"Downside Up" (live)	previously unreleased, originally from OVO	5:33
14.	"Cloudless"	Long Walk Home: Music from the Rabbit-Proof Fence	4:48
Total length:			74:20 (2:30:20)

German edition
No.	Title	Original title/album	Length
1.	"San Jacinto"	"San Jacinto" (Security)	6:31
2.	"Du bist nicht wie wir"	German version of "Not One Of Us" (Melt) from Peter Gabriel - Ein deutsches Album (1980)	3:54
3.	"Wolkenlos"	"Cloudless" (Long Walk Home)	4:47
4.	"Der Rhythmus der Hitze"	"The Rhythm of the Heat" (Security)	5:19
5.	"Kon Takt!"	German version of "I Have The Touch" (Security) from Peter Gabriel - deutsches Album (1982)	4:19
6.	"Ich bin traurig"	"I Grieve" (Up)	7:24
7.	"Handauflegen"	German version of "Lay Your Hands On Me" (Security) from Peter Gabriel - deutsches Album (1982)	6:07
8.	"Absturz"	"The Drop" (Up)	3:03
9.	"Der Turm, der Menschen fraß" (Steve Osborne mix)	"The Tower That Ate People" (Red Planet)	4:06
10.	"Stadt der Liebe"	"Lovetown" (Philadelphia)	5:23
11.	"Vater, Sohn"	"Father, Son" (OVO)	4:57
12.	"Signal an den Lärm"	"Signal to Noise" (Up)	7:34
13.	"Unterseite oben" (live)	"Downside Up" (previously unreleased, originally from OVO)	5:33
14.	"Schnappschuß (Ein Familienfoto)"	German version of "Family Snapshot" (Melt) from Peter Gabriel - Ein deutsches Album (1980)	4:30
Total length:			73:27 (2:29:27)

*Tracks 2, 5, 7, and 14 are taken from the German language album editions Peter Gabriel - Ein deutsches Album (1980) and Peter Gabriel - deutsches Album (1982). All other songs are sung in English. The German titles of these tracks are only for the album sleeves. The German edition of disc 1 is identical to the standard edition except that the song titles are translated into German on the album sleeves.

== Charts ==
Chart performance for Hit
Chart (2003)	Peak position
Belgian Albums (Ultratop Flanders)	34
Belgian Albums (Ultratop Wallonia)	27
German Albums (Offizielle Top 100)	25
Italian Albums (FIMI)	17
New Zealand Albums (RMNZ)	34
Swiss Albums (Schweizer Hitparade)	16
UK Albums (Official Charts)	29
US Billboard 200	100

2022 chart performance for Hit
Chart (2022)	Peak position
Polish Albums (ZPAV)	40

== Certifications ==
Certifications for Hit
Region	Certification	Certified units/sales
United Kingdom (BPI)	Gold	100,000^{^}
^{^} Shipments figures based on certification alone.
