= Live Blood =

Live album by Peter Gabriel
- Released: 23 April 2012
- Recorded: 23–24 March 2011
- Venue: Hammersmith Apollo (London)
- Genres: Baroque pop, post-rock
- Length: 141:14
- Label: Real World/Virgin
- Producer: Peter Gabriel

Peter Gabriel chronology
New Blood (2011)	Live Blood (2012)	And I'll Scratch Yours (2013)

Live Blood is a live album by the English rock musician Peter Gabriel. Recorded at the HMV Hammersmith Apollo, London on 23 and 24 March 2011, the concert featured Gabriel singing with the New Blood Orchestra and vocalists Ane Brun, Melanie Gabriel, Sevara Nazarkhan and Tom Cawley.

The setlist included songs from his previous orchestral covers album Scratch My Back and new orchestral arrangements of his solo songs, most of which went on to appear on the studio album New Blood. A single CD version of Live Blood formed part of the New Blood Deluxe Edition DVD released in 2011. The concerts were filmed in 3D.

The orchestral versions were arranged by John Metcalfe with Peter Gabriel except "Signal to Noise" which was arranged by Peter Gabriel and Will Gregory and "The Book of Love", which was arranged by Nick Ingman. The songs were conducted by Ben Foster, who is best known for his work on the BBC science fiction series Doctor Who, except "In Your Eyes" which was conducted by John Metcalfe.

== Reception ==
Professional ratings
Aggregate scores
Source	Rating
Metacritic	(60/100)
Review scores
Source	Rating
AllMusic	3/5 stars
Classic Rock	9/10
The Independent	3/5 stars
PopMatters	6/10
Consequence of Sound	2.5/5 stars

In The Independent, Andy Gill gave the album three stars out of five and said, "the overall effect can be gruelling. At best, the new arrangements open up dark alleyways of meaning, but save for 'The Book of Love', where Gabriel's sincerity washes away the irony to leave the song more straightforwardly affectionate, the new meanings are rarely optimistic."

== Track listing ==
All tracks are written by Peter Gabriel, except where noted.

Disc one
No.	Title	Writer(s)	Length
1.	"Intruder"		6:05
2.	"Wallflower"		7:25
3.	"The Boy in the Bubble"	Paul Simon	4:33
4.	"Apres Moi"	Regina Spektor	5:26
5.	"The Drop"		2:48
6.	"Washing of the Water" (featuring Melanie Gabriel)		4:21
7.	"The Book of Love"	Stephin Merritt	3:55
8.	"Darkness"		6:33
9.	"The Power of the Heart"	Lou Reed	6:40
10.	"Biko"		6:52
11.	"San Jacinto"		7:47

Disc two
No.	Title	Length
1.	"Digging in the Dirt"	6:08
2.	"Signal to Noise"	8:48
3.	"Downside Up" (featuring Melanie Gabriel)	6:27
4.	"Mercy Street"	6:48
5.	"The Rhythm of the Heat"	6:55
6.	"Blood of Eden"	6:37
7.	"Red Rain"	7:05
8.	"Solsbury Hill"	6:21
9.	"In Your Eyes" (featuring Sevara Nazarkhan)	8:29
10.	"Don't Give Up" (featuring Ane Brun)	8:30
11.	"The Nest That Sailed the Sky"	6:42

== Charts ==
=== Weekly charts ===
Chart performance for New Blood – Live in London
Chart (2011–2013)	Peak position
Australian Music DVD (ARIA)	29
Austrian Music DVD (Ö3 Austria)	3
Belgian Music DVD (Ultratop Flanders)	10
Belgian Music DVD (Ultratop Wallonia)	2
Chilean Music DVD (IFPI)	8
Dutch Music DVD (MegaCharts)	5
French Music DVD (SNEP)	1
German Albums (Offizielle Top 100)	11
Italian Music DVD (FIMI)	2
Norwegian Music DVD (VG-lista)	7
Swedish Music DVD (Sverigetopplistan)	4
Swiss Music DVD (Schweizer Hitparade)	2
UK Music Videos (Official Charts)	5
US Music Videos (Billboard)	4
