= Hits =

Hits or H.I.T.S. may refer to:

== Arts, entertainment, and media ==
=== Music ===
- H.I.T.S., 1991 album by New Kids on the Block
- ...Hits (Phil Collins album), 1998
- Hits (compilation series), 1984–2006; 2014, a British compilation album series
- Hits (Dru Hill album), 2005
- Hits (Mike + The Mechanics album), 1996
- Hits (Kylie Minogue album), 2011, an EMI compilation album released only in Japan, Hong Kong, and the Philippines
- Hits (Joni Mitchell album), 1996
- Hits (New Found Glory album), 2008
- Hits (Pulp album), 2002
- Hits (Seal album), 2009
- Hits (Mauro Scocco album), 1997
- Hits (Spice 1 album), 1998
- Hits (Billy Talent album), 2014
- Hits (The Beach Boys EP), 1966
- Hits (Tony! Toni! Toné! album), 1997
- Hits: Greatest and Others, a 1973 album by Joan Baez
- Hits 1979–1989, a 1989 album by Rosanne Cash
- Hits+, a 2000 album by Kylie Minogue
- Hits! (Kim Kay album), 2000
- Hits! (Boz Scaggs album), 1980
- Hits! The Very Best of Erasure, a 2003 album by Erasure

=== Television channels ===
- TV4 Hits, a Scandinavian premium television channel

=== Other uses in arts, entertainment and media ===
- Hits (film), a 2014 film by David Cross
- Hits (magazine), American music industry publication

== Initialisms ==
=== Technology ===
- Headend in the Sky, satellite communications facility
- High-impulse thermobaric weapons (HITs), a type of explosive that relies on oxygen from the surrounding air
- Highway in the sky, or The Advanced General Aviation Transport Experiments (AGATE) project, a consortium whose goal was to create a Small Aviation Transportation System (SATS)
- Highway In The Sky, synthetic vision system for pilots
- HITS algorithm, Hypertext Induced Topic Selection for Web-page rating

=== Institutions ===
- Heidelberg Institute for Theoretical Studies, a private non-profit research institute in Heidelberg, Germany
- Hindustan Institute of Technology and Science, in Chennai, Tamil Nadu, India

=== Medicine ===
- Heparin-induced thrombocytopenia syndrome, an immune mediated cause of low platelet count due to heparin

=== Other ===
- Homicide Investigation Tracking System, murder and rape case database
- Hidden In The Sand, a fan site dedicated to the indie rock band Tally Hall

== See also ==
- Hit (disambiguation)
- The Hits (disambiguation)
