= In the Big Room =

In The Big Room

Live album by Peter Gabriel
- Released: 27 June 2025
- Recorded: 23 November 2003
- Venue: Real World Studios (Wiltshire)
- Length: 90:48
- Label: Real World
- Producer: Peter Gabriel

Peter Gabriel chronology
I/O (2023)	In The Big Room (2025)	Live at WOMAD 1982 (2025)

In The Big Room is a live album by the English rock musician Peter Gabriel. The album consists of material taken from a performance at Gabriel's Real World Studios on 23 November 2003 with the touring lineup from Gabriel's Growing Up Tour. The album was released digitally on 27 June 2025 and received a physical release on 13 March 2026.

== Background ==
The recordings were culled from a 23 November 2003 live performance that Gabriel held in the Big Room of his Real World Studios. Gabriel performed with members of his backing band from his 2002-2003 Growing Up Tour, with the setlist primarily including material from that tour and the 2004 Still Growing Up Tour. The performance was held for members of Gabriel's Full Moon Club, which Gabriel had established around the release of Up to provide fans with announcements and music clips.

In The Big Room was initially made available digitally in June 2025. In January 2026, it was announced that the album would be released on a double 180g black vinyl and a 2CD package, with the CD coming in mini-LP vinyl replica sleeves on 13 March 2026. Both editions of the album were packaged in gatefold jackets.

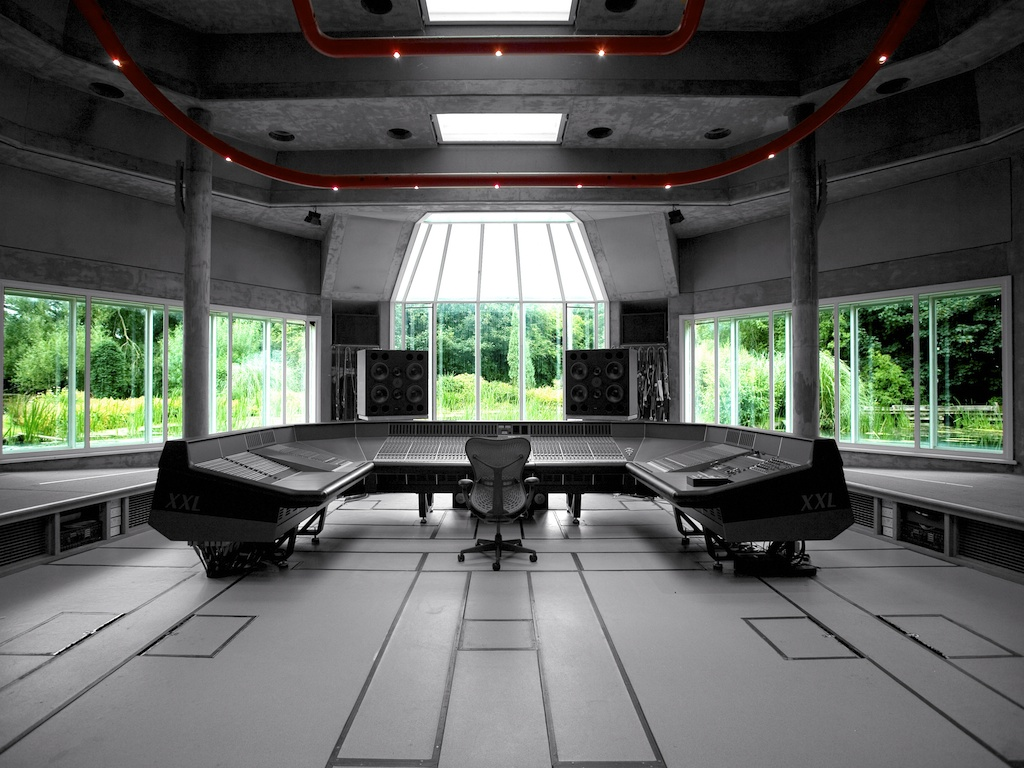
"The Big Room" in Real World Studios

When discussing the performance, Gabriel said that the band was not " as polished and rehearsed as we might have been while on tour, but it made for a more awake and edgy performance, as we were fully concentrating on what we were doing. There was no elaborate visual show; the whole focus was about making it sound good." He also expressed his belief that he had not taken advantage of the Big Room as a performance space, which prompted him to offer certain members of his Full Moon Club an opportunity to see him perform at the location.

The Big Room, which is situated in a glass extension of the main facility, spans 195 square meters and hosts a custom Solid State Logic 9000K mixing console with 72 inputs. Peter Large, who had been responsible for installing a Solid State Logic mixing console in Gabriel's previous recording studio, said that the Big Room was "designed to be a great space to perform in, as opposed to a pristine monitoring environment." Various materials including RPG sound diffusing and glass panels were installed on the rear wall of the room to alter the acoustics.

== Track listing ==
All tracks are written by Peter Gabriel, except where noted.

No.	Title	Writer(s)	Length
1.	"Burn You Up, Burn You Down"	Gabriel, Karl Wallinger, Neil Sparkes	4:23
2.	"More Than This"		6:12
3.	"Games Without Frontiers"		5:01
4.	"Downside Up"		5:30
5.	"Mercy Street"		6:02
6.	"Darkness"		6:45
7.	"Digging in the Dirt"		6:31
8.	"The Tower That Ate People"		5:01
9.	"San Jacinto"		8:24
10.	"Shock the Monkey"		5:26
11.	"Signal to Noise"		8:04
12.	"Secret World"		8:26
13.	"Father, Son"		4:26
14.	"In Your Eyes"		10:00

== Personnel ==
- Peter Gabriel – vocals, keyboards
- Melanie Gabriel – vocals
- Tony Levin – bass, vocals
- David Rhodes – guitar, vocals
- Richard Evans – guitar, mandolin, whistle, vocals
- Rachel Z – keyboards, vocals
- Ged Lynch – drums

== Charts ==
Weekly chart performance for In The Big Room
Chart (2026)	Peak position
Austrian Albums (Ö3 Austria)	22
Belgian Albums (Ultratop Flanders)	82
Belgian Albums (Ultratop Wallonia)	44
Croatian International Albums (HDU)	3
Dutch Albums (Album Top 100)	98
French Physical Albums (SNEP)	57
French Rock & Metal Albums (SNEP)	10
German Albums (Offizielle Top 100)	12
Scottish Albums (OCC)	10
Swiss Albums (Schweizer Hitparade)	28
