= Live at WOMAD 1982 =

Live album by Peter Gabriel
- Released: 8 August 2025
- Recorded: 16 July 1982
- Venue: Bath & West Showground (Shepton Mallet, Somerset)
- Length: 55:52
- Label: Real World
- Producer: Peter Gabriel

Peter Gabriel chronology
In The Big Room (2025)	Live at WOMAD 1982 (2025)	O\I (2026)

Live at WOMAD 1982 is a live album by the English rock musician Peter Gabriel comprising material from his 16 July 1982 performance for the first WOMAD festival, which took place at the Bath & West Showground in Somerset. The album received a digital release on 8 August 2025.

== Background ==
Gabriel conceived the idea of WOMAD in 1980 with the intention of exposing large audiences to music from artists around the world. The Dingaka soundtrack and the work of Dollar Brand had fostered Gabriel's interest in world music. Gabriel sourced some audio tapes of musicians from Africa, Bali, and Aboriginal Australians and was directed to Thomas Brooman by David Lord. After conducting an interview with Brooman's publication, The Bristol Recorder, Gabriel hosted Brooman and other members of the Bristol Recorder personnel at Ashcombe House to discuss plans for organising a concert that aligned with their interests in non-western music, including Pakistani music and Gamelan.

Gabriel, Brooman, and Bob Hooton, who was also involved with The Bristol Recorder, formed a committee to scout out potential talent and fundraisers for the event, with Brooman being appointed as the festival director. Brooman attended the Rennes Rhythm festival in April 1981 with the intention of recruiting the Sabri Brothers and the Royal Drummers of Burundi for their planned event. Upon Brooman's return from the festival, the planned date of the first WOMAD event was pushed back one year from summer 1981 to July 1982. Brooman reflected that the event's postponement demonstrated their lack of understanding in organising a music festival, saying that "looking back it was pretty naive, because this decision to delay it by a year did not imply we knew what we were doing". After contemplating a six-day event, WOMAD was ultimately scheduled for the weekend of 16–18 July 1982 at the Royal Bath & West Showground.

WOMAD was promoted in New Musical Express as "a festival of new and traditional arts around the world" in its 12 June 1982 publication. According to the 2002 edition of Real World Notes, the purpose of WOMAD was to "focus wider UK public attention on the traditional and contemporary arts of non-western cultures".

At the request of showground authorities, some of the rock acts such as Gabriel and Echo and the Bunnymen were instructed to perform at the indoor Showering Pavilion venue, which had a crowd capacity of 4,000 people. Gabriel's erstwhile manager Gail Colson had some reservations about the festival and wished that Gabriel had consulted with Harold Pendleton for logistical support as he had experience with organising the National Jazz and Blues Festival.

The Evening Standard reported that the expenses associated with the organization of WOMAD totaled £200,000 and that some of the costs would be recuperated through the benefit album, which would include contributions from Echo and the Bunnymen, The Beat, Simple Minds, and XTC. New Musical Express said that a festival benefit album, titled Music and Rhythm, would be released on 9 July 1982, which would be paired with a single featuring "Himalaya" by L. Shankar and a track by Echo and the Bunnymen called "Branches", the latter of which was made specifically for the benefit album according to Record Mirror.

=== Performance ===
Gabriel ultimately performed twice at the Showering Pavilion, with the first set occurring on Friday, which was promoted as a "special festival set of non-album material" with David Rhodes and Peter Hammill on guitar, John Giblin on bass, Larry Fast on keyboards, and Jerry Marotta on drums. Members of the drum ensemble Ekomé performed on certain songs in the setlist including "The Rhythm of the Heat" and "Biko". On the final day of the festival, Gabriel also performed a second set consisting of four songs, including the debut of "Across the River" with Hamill, Rhodes, Fast, Shankar, and Stewart Copeland.

With the exception of "Wallflower", every song from Gabriel's forthcoming 1982 self-titled album was previewed during the first set. According to Gabriel, he and his band spent four days rehearsing the setlist, adding that he "wouldn't normally dare try to present an all-new show with that amount of preparation." Fast was tasked with recreating some of the synth sounds from the solo album in a live setting and ultimately settled on bringing a Fairlight CMI onstage to program these sounds, which he then stored on disk drives. Several of these programmed sounds were later used for Gabriel's Plays Live set. Gabriel's backing band donned black tracksuits for the Showering Pavilion performance and footage from Gabriel's performance of "The Rhythm of the Heat" was used on a South Bank Show documentary.

I remember this gig well. We played a mix of old and brand-new material. I would normally be very nervous about playing some of this stuff for the first time, however my mind was very preoccupied with the running of our very first WOMAD festival and the potential financial disaster that it was heading towards.

— Peter Gabriel

== Track listing ==
All tracks are written by Peter Gabriel.

No.	Title	Length
1.	"San Jacinto"	6:40
2.	"The Family and the Fishing Net"	6:49
3.	"I Have the Touch"	5:21
4.	"Lay Your Hands on Me"	6:20
5.	"Shock the Monkey"	6:02
6.	"I Go Swimming"	5:43
7.	"The Rhythm of the Heat"	7:11
8.	"Kiss of Life"	4:29
9.	"Biko"	7:11

== Personnel ==
- Peter Gabriel – vocals, keyboards
- David Rhodes – guitar
- Peter Hammill – guitar, vocals
- John Giblin – bass
- Larry Fast – synthesizers
- Jerry Marotta – drums
- Ekome – percussion

== Charts ==
Chart performance for Live at WOMAD 1982
Chart (2026)	Peak position
Austrian Albums (Ö3 Austria)	58
Belgian Albums (Ultratop Wallonia)	65
French Physical Albums (SNEP)	51
French Rock & Metal Albums (SNEP)	17
German Albums (Offizielle Top 100)	45
Norwegian Physical Albums (IFPI Norge)	3
Polish Albums (ZPAV)	21
Scottish Albums (OCC)	26
Swiss Albums (Schweizer Hitparade)	49
