= Still Growing Up: Live & Unwrapped =

2005 Peter Gabriel concert film

Video by Peter Gabriel
- Released: 22 November 2005
- Recorded: 2004
- Genre: Rock
- Length: 206 mins
- Label: Geffen (US & Canada); Virgin Video
- Director: Hamish Hamilton
- Producer: Ian Stewart

Peter Gabriel chronology
Play (2004)	Still Growing Up: Live & Unwrapped (2005)

Still Growing Up: Live & Unwrapped is a DVD film by Hamish Hamilton and Peter Gabriel. It features several live performances from Gabriel's 2004 Still Growing Up tour. The film aims to show Gabriel in a more intimate setting, discarding many of the stage antics featured in Growing Up: Live. Bonus features include exclusive interview footage of Gabriel and his live band, live rehearsals of "Darkness", "No Way Out" and "Growing Up", as well as live performances of "Father, Son" and "Downside Up" on Later... with Jools Holland.

== Setlist ==
=== Still Growing Up Live ===
1. "The Feeling Begins" – 5:00
2. "Red Rain" – 6:14
3. "Secret World" – 9:20
4. "White Ashes" – 4:44
5. "Games Without Frontiers" – 6:06
6. "Burn You Up, Burn You Down" – 6:30
7. "The Tower That Ate People" – 5:11
8. "San Jacinto" – 8:27
9. "Digging in the Dirt" – 7:40
10. "Solsbury Hill" – 4:45
11. "Sledgehammer" – 5:12
12. "Come Talk to Me" – 9:40
13. "Biko" – 8:59

=== Extras (Bonus Tracks) ===
1. "In Your Eyes" (From The 2004 'Still Growing Up Live' Tour) – 11:48
2. "No Self Control" (From The 1988 'This Way Up' World Tour Film 'P.O.V.') – 6:02
3. Credits – 1:52

== Personnel ==
- Peter Gabriel – vocals, keyboards
- Richard Evans – guitar
- Melanie Gabriel – vocals
- Tony Levin – bass guitar, backing vocals
- Ged Lynch – drums
- David Rhodes – guitar, backing vocals
- Rachel Z – keyboards

== Charts ==
Chart performance for Still Growing Up: Live & Unwrapped
Chart (2005)	Peak position
Dutch Music DVD (MegaCharts)	12
German Albums (Offizielle Top 100)	74
Swedish Music DVD (Sverigetopplistan)	19
