= Signal to Noise (song) =

Song by Peter Gabriel

from the album Up
- Released: 2002
- Recorded: 1996–2002
- Studio: Real World Studios (Box, UK); AIR (London)
- Length: 7:36
- Label: Geffen (US and Canada); Virgin; Real World
- Songwriter: Peter Gabriel
- Producer: Peter Gabriel

"Signal to Noise" is a song written and recorded by English musician Peter Gabriel, included as the ninth track on his 2002 solo album, Up. The song features vocals from the Pakistani singer Nusrat Fateh Ali Khan, whose contributions were taken from a 1996 live performance of "Signal to Noise". Since its inclusion on Up, "Signal to Noise" has appeared on several of Peter Gabriel's live and compilation albums.

== Background ==
=== Early live performances ===
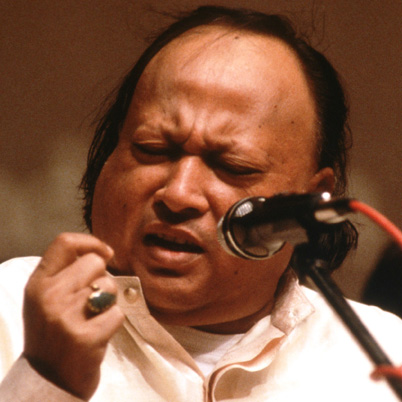
"Signal to Noise" features vocal contributions from Nusrat Fateh Ali Khan.

"Signal to Noise" debuted at the VH-1 Honors concert at the Universal Amphitheatre on 28 April 1996 for the group Witness. Gabriel performed the song with Nusrat Fateh Ali Khan, a Pakistani singer whom Gabriel met at the 1985 WOMAD festival. Khan later secured a record deal with Gabriel's Real World Records label and also collaborated together on the Passion soundtrack album. "Signal to Noise" was rehearsed roughly two times before its live debut, which was filmed for a television audience.

During the rehearsals, Gabriel recalled that Khan would come up with "very different improvisations" that were "stunning". Further discussing the collaboration, Gabriel said that "I think we both tried to make space for each other to do what we could. Me more on the arrangement side and him in terms of the verse, but it is a performance that I'll remember always". Gabriel had also performed the song as a duet with Youssou N'Dour on 10 December 1998 for an Amnesty International event celebrating the 50th anniversary of the Universal Declaration of Human Rights.

=== Recording ===
Gabriel said that initial versions of "Signal to Noise" were "starker" and lacked any strings. After Khan's death, Gabriel decided to finish the song and "make it a sort of centrepiece" for Up. Khan died in August 1997, so parts of his vocals from the 1996 VH-1 Honors were used on the studio recording.

Later on in development, reversed string samples and a live orchestra were added to the recording. The string samples were fed throughout the recording studio and recaptured with a Sony R3 Oxford mixing console, which was then processed through the console's EQ functions to make the strings sound more dynamic. Gabriel also worked with Will Gregory for about a week on the song's string arrangements, which were recorded by the London Session Orchestra at Air Lyndhurst. Recounting his involvement with Gregory, Gabriel said it was "the dirtiest I've got my hands in the string arrangements and that it was very satisfying in terms of trying to generate all sorts of melodic and harmonic things that were quiet clashing in places".

According to the 2002 electronic press kit issued by Virgin Records and Real World Records, the signal that is referenced in the song is a metaphor for "personal morality and compassion." The song also received accompanying artwork created by Michal Rovner in the liner notes titled Falling in the Field, which depicts a series of blurry figures on a field.

== Later live performances and other appearances ==
In 2002, an alternate version of "Signal to Noise" appeared on the movie soundtrack for the Martin Scorsese film Gangs of New York. With the exception of some vocals from Khan, this recording is instrumental, with more prominent distorted guitar than the version found on Up. The Gangs of New York mix later appeared on the 2019 digital-exclusive Flotsam and Jetsam, a collection containing B-sides, remixes and rarities from Gabriel.

When determining the setlist for the 2002-2003 Growing Up Tour, Gabriel considered "Signal to Noise" as a possible contender for inclusion. Given that Khan had died several years before the tour commenced, Gabriel contemplated the idea of "put[ting] something of him on video". "Signal to Noise" was ultimately included as the final song of the main set, during which Khan's vocals and pre-recorded strings were layered on top of the band's playing. During these performances, a rising power-generator effect was projected onto the center of the stage. Near the conclusion of the song, members of Gabriel's touring band would exit the stage via trap doors until only Ged Lynch remained on drums, whose kit was surrounded by what Chris Rubin of Rolling Stone described as "a cylinder of fabric". A live recording taken from a May 2003 performance at the Fila Forum in Milan was included on the 2019 Growing Up Live concert film. Gabriel had also performed the song in November 2003 at Real World Studios for members of his Full Moon Club, which later appeared on the In the Big Room album.

In 2004, the studio version of "Signal to Noise" appeared on Gabriel's compilation album Hit. Gabriel performed the song on his 2007 Warm Up Tour, which spanned 22 shows in Europe with a setlist consisting of rarely performed material that was suggested by fans online. An orchestral rendition of "Signal to Noise" was made available exclusively via download to accompany the release of Gabriel's New Blood album in 2011. The following year, a live orchestral rendition of "Signal to Noise" was included on the 2012 Live Blood album.

== Critical reception ==
Andy Hermann of PopMatters characterised "Signal to Noise" as a "melodramatic" song that was "punctuated by the disturbingly manic chants of the late Pakistani singer Nusrat Fateh Ali Khan". Writing for The Guardian, Alexis Petridis said that it was "difficult to remain unmoved" by Khan's vocals on "Signal to Noise". Chris Ott of Pitchfork felt that "Signal to Noise" was "heavily indebted to Bjork's Jóga and said that it would "entertain only the least critical in Gabriel's audience". Writing for Salon, Jonathan Kiefer described "Signal to Noise" as the closest thing on Up that resembles a mission statement.

== Personnel ==
- Peter Gabriel – lead vocals, bass keys, Oxford backwards samples, Mellotron, MPC groove, SansAmp, string arrangements
- Nusrat Fateh Ali Khan – additional vocals
- David Rhodes – guitars, backing vocals
- Steve Gadd – drums, percussion
- Ged Lynch – percussion
- The Dhol Foundation – dhol drums
- Richard Chappell – programming
- The London Session Orchestra – strings
- Will Gregory – string arrangements
- Nick Ingham – orchestration
