= Heet =

Heet or HEET may refer to

- HEET, High Entrance/Exit Turnstile
- Iso-HEET, a brand of isopropanol antifreeze produced by Gold Eagle
- Hīt, a city in Iraq

== See also ==
- Hit (disambiguation)
