= Hit =

Hit means to strike someone or something.

Hit or HIT may also refer to:

== Arts, entertainment and media ==
=== Fictional entities ===
- Hit, a fictional character from Dragon Ball Super
- Homicide International Trust or HIT, a fictional organization in MacGyver
- Homicide Intervention Team or HIT, a fictional investigative organization in the HIT Indian film series (see below)

=== Film and television ===
- HIT (TV series), a Spanish high school-drama themed-awarded series
- H.I.T (TV series), a South Korean drama miniseries
- HIT Entertainment, a British-American production company
- Hit!, a 1973 crime film
- TV HIT, a Bosnian television channel
- HIT (film series), Indian crime thriller film series
  - HIT: The First Case, 2020 Indian Telugu-language crime thriller film by Sailesh Kolanu
    - HIT: The Second Case, 2022 sequel film by Kolanu
  - HIT: The First Case (2022 film), 2022 remake of the 2020 Telugu film in Hindi

=== Music ===
- Hit song, a recorded song that becomes popular or commercially successful
- Hit (album), by Peter Gabriel
- "Hit" (The Sugarcubes song), a single by The Sugarcubes from their 1992 album Stick Around for Joy
- "Hit", a song by Guided by Voices from the 1995 album Alien Lanes
- "Hit", a song by The Wannadies from the 1997 album Bagsy Me
- "HIT", a song by Seventeen from An Ode, 2019
- Hit Records (Croatia), a Croatian record label
- Hit Records, a defunct American record company
- "The Hit", a song by Daughters from Daughters
- Orchestra hit, a synthesized staccato note in popular music

=== Radio ===
- Hit FM (disambiguation)
- Hit Network, an Australian radio network

== Brands and enterprises ==
- Hit (drink), a Venezuelan carbonated soft drink
- Hit (mosquito repellent), an Indonesian mosquito repellent
- Hitachi, Ltd., a Japanese multinational conglomerate
- Hongkong International Terminals Ltd.
- Heavy Industries Taxila, a military complex in Pakistan

== Computing ==
- Hit (internet), a single request for a file from a web server
- An intersection of the cursor and graphic object during hit-testing in computer graphics
- Human Intelligence Task, an Amazon Mechanical Turk task

== Education ==
- Hanze Institute of Technology, in the Netherlands
- Harare Institute of Technology, in Zimbabwe
- Harbin Institute of Technology, in China
- Heritage Institute of Technology, Kolkata, in India
- Holon Institute of Technology, in Israel

== Language ==
- Hit (pronoun), Old English, third-person singular neuter accusative, "it" in modern English
- Hit, slang for contract killing
- Hittite language

== Places ==
=== Iran ===
- Hit, Qasr-e Qand, a village in Iran

=== Iraq ===
  - Hit Rural District, Iraq
- Hit, Iraq, a town
  - Hit District, a district centered on the town

=== Norway ===
- Hitra Municipality, IIGA country code

=== Syria ===
- Hit, Daraa Governorate, a village
- Hit, Suwayda Governorate, a village with noted Roman/Byzantine ruins

== Science and medicine ==
- Health information technology
- Heparin-induced thrombocytopenia
- Herd immunity threshold; see herd immunity § Mechanism
- Hibernation induction trigger

== Sports ==
- Hit (baseball) or base hit
- High intensity training
- The Hit (Chuck Bednarik), a November 20, 1960, tackle by Chuck Bednarik of the Philadelphia Eagles on Frank Gifford of the New York Giants

== See also ==
- Hits (disambiguation)
- The Hit (disambiguation)
