= Lovetown (song) =

Single by Peter Gabriel

from the album Philadelphia
- Released: 30 May 1994
- Length: 5:29
- Label: Epic Records
- Songwriter: Peter Gabriel
- Producers: Peter Gabriel; Daniel Lanois

Peter Gabriel singles chronology
"Kiss That Frog" (1993)	"Lovetown" (1994)	"While the Earth Sleeps" (1996)

"Lovetown" is a song written and performed by English rock musician Peter Gabriel. Originally released on the soundtrack to the 1993 film Philadelphia, "Lovetown" was later released as a single and reached the top 50 in the UK. It later appeared on the second disc of Gabriel's 2003 compilation album Hit. A music video, directed by Michael Coulson and produced by Jacqueline White, was also made for "Lovetown". Yayoi Kusama, who made the single artwork for the song, provided creative input for the music video.

== Background ==
"Lovetown" was recorded during the sessions for Gabriel's Us album, released in 1992. The song derived some musical elements from an earlier track titled "Who Do You Serve". When assembling the track list for Us, Gabriel contacted eleven artists to contribute artwork to accompany each song on the album. Yayoi Kusama was assigned to "Lovetown" and created a piece of artwork with contorted silver coils in different formations placed in four boxes. Kusama named the piece "The Return to Eternity" and said that the sculpture reflected the philosophy of Friedrich Nietzsche and his ontological views. She had originally wanted the sculpture to comprise 300 distinct units, but instead pared this down to four.

"Lovetown" was ultimately dropped from the track list of Us as it was deemed too downbeat, although Kusama's creation was still displayed at the Art 93 event. The art gallery featured eleven commissioned works from artists selected by Gabriel, who planned to make the exhibit a visual-audio experience where a radio frequency would switch to the corresponding track as visitors entered each exhibit. This idea was not fully realised for the London Contemporary Art Fair, but he planned to implement the concept for European stops scheduled later in 1993. Her artwork was accompanied with a video explanation, which was filmed by Michael Coulson and later used for a different exhibit in Yokohama.

Musically, the song is an R&B ballad with instrumentation of drums, horns, organ, tremolo guitars, and a bass guitar that Ryan Reed of Rolling Stone described as "elastic". Throughout the song, Gabriel switches between a tenor voice and a falsetto. The lyrics use a figurative city surrounded by walls as a metaphor for love. Further lyrical references are made to wounds inflicted by teeth and "knots so tightly tied/we could not uncoil". The lyric "We seek the teeth that match the wounds" was taken by a line written by Kenneth Tynan.

== Live performances and release ==
Gabriel performed "Lovetown" during certain shows of his Secret World Tour, although it did not appear on the Secret World Live album. During the Secret World Tour, Gabriel sang "Lovetown" on a bed surrounded by set pieces evoking a hotel room that were created by Robert Lepage, which including a television. Commenting on the song's inclusion on the Secret World Tour, Lepage said that it was "a wonderful moment of theatre, it's just that the song wasn't upbeat enough to survive this huge enterprise, so after the Stockholm and Oslo shows it was out of there."

"Lovetown" was ultimately included on the soundtrack to Philadelphia, a 1993 film starring Tom Hanks that centered around AIDS. In January 1994, song was serviced to various radio formats in the United States and debuted at No. 58 on the AOR Tracks chart compiled by Radio & Records later that month. For the week dated 12 February 1994, "Lovetown" peaked at No. 22 on the Billboard Modern Rock Tracks chart based on airplay from 30 modern rock radio stations monitored by Broadcast Data Systems. On 30 May 1994, "Lovetown" was issued as a single in the UK, where it peaked at No. 49. In 2003, the song was also included on the Miss disc of Gabriel's Hit album.

== Music video ==
Kusama later worked with Gabriel on the music video for "Lovetown", which incorporated visuals of trailer parks, yuppies, and scenes from a nightclub. Various scenes were also adorned with polka-dotted mushrooms on a lawn, rainbows blazoned across the sky, and sculptures resembling weeds. During certain scenes of the music video, Gabriel is seen walking across a lawn in an overcoat while carrying a suitcase. The music video for "Lovetown" later appeared on Gabriel's 2004 Play: The Videos, which received a Dolby Stereo mix and 5.1 surround sound mixes offered in Dolby Digital and DTS formats.

== Critical reception ==
In a review of the Philadelphia soundtrack, Steve Morse of The Boston Globe dismissed "Lovetown" as a "throwaway" in Gabriel's discography. Writing for The New York Times, Stephen Holden thought that the song was a "high point" on the soundtrack but "scarcely noticeable in the film". He believed that the song was "as anguished as Mr. Springsteen's ballad ("Streets of Philadelphia), although not nearly as direct." J. D. Considine highlighted the quiet introduction to "Lovetown" in his review for The Baltimore Sun and said that the intro allowed for the song's "slow burn [to be] that much more effective."

In a retrospective review, Nick DeRiso of Ultimate Classic Rock characterised "Lovetown" as a song that foreshadowed the material that would later appear on Gabriel's 2002 Up album, particularly "Sky Blue". DeRiso also felt that the song's lyrics, which likened a relationship to an enclosed town, matched the source material in Philadelphia. Ryan Reed of Rolling Stone noted similarities between "Sky Blue" and "Lovetown" and said that the latter "beckoned for a wider audience".

== Track listing ==
- 7 inch single
1. "Lovetown"
2. "Love to Be Loved"
- CD single
1. "Lovetown"
2. "Love To Be Loved"
3. "A Different Drum"

== Personnel ==
- Peter Gabriel – vocals, keyboards, percussion, programming
- Tony Levin – bass guitar
- David Rhodes – guitar
- Leo Nocentelli – guitar
- Manu Katché – drums
- David Bottrill – additional programming
- Reggie Houston – horns
- Tim Green – horns
- Renard Poche – horns

== Chart performance ==
Weekly chart performance for "Lovetown"
Chart (1994)	Peak position
Germany (GfK)	95
New Zealand (Recorded Music NZ)	17
UK Singles (OCC)	49
US Alternative Airplay (Billboard)	22
