= The Hits (disambiguation) =

The Hits is a former UK music television channel.

The Hits may also refer to:

== Radio stations ==
- The Hits (radio station), a New Zealand radio station
- The Hits, a former radio station in the UK; see Timeline of Hits Radio

== Albums ==
- The Hits 1969–1984, 1984 album by Sherbet
- The Hits (Ace of Base album), 2004
- The Hits (Alexia album), 2000
- The Hits (Amii Stewart album), 1985
- The Hits (April Wine album), 1987
- The Hits (Billy Joel album), 2010
- The Hits (Dr. Bombay album), 2007
- The Hits (Faith Hill album), 2007
- The Hits (Garth Brooks album), 1994
- The Hits (Hal Ketchum album) 1996
- The Hits (Jagged Edge album), 2006
- The Hits (Kelis album), 2008
- The Hits (Lemar album), 2010
- The Hits (MC Breed album), 2007
- The Hits (MC Hammer album), 2000
- The Hits (REO Speedwagon album), 1988
- The Hits (Will Young album), 2009
- The Hits, song of Ladysmith Black Mambazo, 2006
- The Hits, song of Perfect Stranger, 2001
- The Hits/The B-Sides, a 1993 album by Prince
- The Hits Chapter 1 (Sammy Kershaw album) and The Hits Chapter 2, 1995 and 2001 albums by Sammy Kershaw
- The Hits: Chapter One, a 2001 album by The Backstreet Boys

== Other uses ==
- The Hits, an alternative name of UK band The Snivelling Shits

== See also ==
- The Hits Collection (disambiguation)
- Hits (compilation series), a compilation album series by Sony BMG and Warner Music
- The Hits & Beyond, a 2006 album by Dannii Minogue
- Greatest hits, a type of album
- Hits Radio, a British music radio network
