= Hits Collection =

Hit(s) Collection may refer to:

- Hits Collection, compilation album by Atahualpa Yupanqui
- Hits Collection, compilation album by Dusty Springfield
- Hits Collection, compilation album by Culture Club
- Hit Collection, compilation album by Boney M.

== See also ==
- The Hits Collection (disambiguation)
