= Washing of the Water =

Song by Peter Gabriel

from the album Us
- Released: 1992
- Recorded: 1990–1992
- Studio: Real World, Box, UK; Kingsway, New Orleans, Louisiana
- Length: 3:52
- Label: Real World Records
- Songwriter: Peter Gabriel
- Producers: Daniel Lanois; Peter Gabriel

"Washing of the Water" is a song written and recorded by the English musician Peter Gabriel, included on his 1992 solo album, Us. Similar to all other songs on Us, "Washing of the Water" was accompanied by a piece of artwork in the album liner notes. Gabriel has since performed on several occasions, including multiple concert tours and during his 2014 Rock and Roll Hall of Fame induction performance.

Jools Holland recorded a cover of "Washing of the Water" with Gabriel for the Jools Holland & His Rhythm & Blues Orchestra album Friends 3. This version received a music video that was included on Gabriel's Play video album. This music video was edited and assembled by York Tillyer, who also provided some of the video material along with Artbeats Film Library and Gabriel, who supplied some footage from his home videos.

== Background ==
Commenting on the song, Gabriel said that "Washing of the Water" reflected "a desire for the water to wash over me in the sense of cleansing and purification" and was "sort of a spiritual yearning". He also called it "a love song about being in a painful place" and said that the washing of the water served as a metaphor for healing.

Musically, "Washing of the Water" incorporates elements of spiritual music, gospel music, and soft rock. Gabriel described the intro as "quite sensitive", which begins with a slow drum pattern played by Manu Katché. At times, Gabriel was dissatisfied with the drum groove, believing that it resembled "a guy in an old hotel, in a bar band" with a cabaret feel. He ultimately decided that these reference points were suitable for the song, saying that "it has a really nice poignant, quite slap-dash quality that I think is very emotional."

Gabriel sings the first verse of "Washing of the Water" in his normal register before transitioning into a falsetto and his upper register for the verse directly preceding the bridge, which features a horn arrangement from Malcolm Burn with session musicians that include Wayne Jackson and Reggie Houston. Burn had been contacted by Daniel Lanois while they were both in New Orleans. According to Burn, he was not given "any real direction" and was instead "asked for something good". Lanois, who co-produced "Washing of the Water" along with the rest of Us with Gabriel, commented on the song in a 2016 interview.

Washing On The Water was like a hymn or a lullaby. Peter has a beautiful falsetto. When a man goes into a falsetto in such an empty landscape, emotion comes through. It was a song that meant a lot to Peter and we managed to capture it. May it live on.

== Critical reception ==
Andy Gill of The Independent highlighted "Washing of the Water" as one of the "outstanding tracks" on Us, saying that "the carefully-etched backdrop lends the song an ancient heart akin to that suggested by The Band at their best." Writing for Record Collector, Jamie Atkins likened the song to "Dennis Wilson on a fishing trip with Randy Newman. Writing for Prog magazine, Daryl Easlea called "Washing of the Water" "quietly soul-baring".

== Artwork ==
Gabriel commissioned several artists to create pieces of artwork to accompany each song on Us. The artwork for "Washing of the Water" was taken by Andy Goldsworthy in the Scottish Highlands on a moorland river. Goldsworthy had previously visited the location in the autumn for salmon watching; he picked some rocks that had been weathered by the river and were only visible and accessible when the water level was low. He took a photograph of the location using an cibachrome technique, with the image containing a partially enclosed formation of sticks that had been stretched by Goldsworthy abutted by mossy rocks.

Commenting on the artwork, Goldsworthy said that the piece "has the quality of a fish and of going upstream" and that "when I talk about the river I am talking about life and the deepness that goes well beyond the water. As the river rises… it will rise out of the work." Goldsworthy's piece was later showcased along with all of the other artwork for Us at exhibitions held at the Art 93 London Contemporary Art Fair and Yokohama.

== Live performances ==
Gabriel first performed "Washing of the Water" on his 1993–1994 Secret World Tour. During these performances, Gabriel sang on a moving walkway that transported him between two stages. One of these renditions was included on the Secret World video album which won the Grammy Award for Best Music Film in 1996. Gabriel also occasionally played "Washing of the Water" on his 2007 Warm Up Tour, which consisted of rarely performed material in Gabriel's discography, some of which were suggested by fans on his website.

On his 2010–2012 New Blood tour beginning, Gabriel performed an orchestral rendition of "Washing of the Water". Timothy Finn of The Kansas City Star wrote that this version retained its "redemptive and meditative vibe" from the original recording found on Us and that "with a 50-plus-piece orchestra behind it instead of a rock band, it feels more hymnal, more spiritual." "Washing of the Water" was included on the DVD/Blue-ray edition of Gabriel's New Blood album. He also performed the song during the 2012 leg of his Back to Front Tour.

In 2014, Gabriel played "Washing of the Water" live during his Rock and Roll Hall of Fame induction performance as a duet with Chris Martin, who provided the preceding induction speech. During the speech, Martin recounted how "Washing of the Water" had been his favourite song from Us ever since he purchased it on cassette in the early 1990s. This recording was included on the 2018 Blu-ray Rock & Roll Hall of Fame in Concert.

"Washing of the Water" served as the opening song of Gabriel's I/O The Tour for most shows, during which Gabriel and his backing band would situate themselves in a semicircle formation around the campfire behind a projection of the moon. The song began with just Gabriel and Levin playing, after which the rest of the band entered the stage, with David Rhodes using a Guild acoustic baritone guitar and Manu Katché playing a Roland HandSonic.

== Personnel ==
- Peter Gabriel – vocals, keyboards
- Tony Levin – bass
- Manu Katché – drums
- Caroline Lavelle – cello
- Mark Rivera – alto saxophone
- Tim Green – tenor saxophone
- Reggie Houston – baritone saxophone
- Renard Poché – trombone
- Wayne Jackson – cornet
