= The Hit =

The Hit may refer to:

== Books ==
- The Hit, a 1957 novel by Julian Mayfield
- The Hit, a 2009 novel by Patrick Quinlan
- The Hit (novel), a 2013 novel by David Baldacci
- The Hit, a 2013 novel by Melvin Burgess

== Film and television ==
- The Hit (2001 film), a 2001 feature film starring Joanna Pacula
- The Hit (1984 film), a 1984 feature film directed by Stephen Frears
- The Hit (1981 film), a 1981 Czechoslovak comedy film directed by Zdeněk Podskalský
- Schlager (film), English title The Hit, an Israeli comic musical film of 1979
- The Hit (Irish TV series), an Irish reality TV series
- The Hit (South Korean TV series), a Korean music mash up TV series

== Other uses ==
- The Hit (Chuck Bednarik), a November 20, 1960 tackle by Chuck Bednarik of thePhiladelphia Eagles on Frank Gifford of the New York Giants
- "The Hit", a song on the album by Bang Camaro II by Bang Camaro

== See also ==
- Hit (disambiguation)
- The Hit Factory (disambiguation)
