= Games Without Frontiers =

Games Without Frontiers could refer to:

- Jeux sans frontières, a European television game show
- "Games Without Frontiers" (song), a 1980 song by Peter Gabriel
- "Games Without Frontiers", a 1980 episode of the British television anthology series BBC2 Playhouse
