= Wallflower (Peter Gabriel song) =

Single by Peter Gabriel

from the album Peter Gabriel (Security)
- B-side: "Kiss of Life"
- Released: 1982
- Recorded: 1981–1982
- Studio: Ashcombe House, Bath, England
- Length: 6:30 (album version); 5:21 (single edit)
- Label: Geffen
- Songwriter: Peter Gabriel
- Producers: David Lord; Peter Gabriel

Peter Gabriel singles chronology
| "I Have the Touch" (1982) | "Wallflower" (1982) | "I Don't Remember (Live)" (1983) |

"Wallflower" is a song by the English rock musician Peter Gabriel from his fourth eponymous studio album released in 1982. The song was released as a single in the Netherlands but did not chart. Some of the instrumentation from "Wallflower" was incorporated into "Under Lock and Key" and "At Night", which appeared on Gabriel's 1985 Birdy soundtrack album. He also performed the song with an orchestral arrangement for his 2011 New Blood album. Lyrically, "Wallflower" touches upon human rights issues, specifically the treatment of political prisoners.

== Background ==
Gabriel recorded a demo of "Wallflower" during the recording sessions of his 1980 eponymous release. The demo contained melodic aspects that were eventually used on his 1982 eponymous release, although the lyrics took some additional time to develop. Melodic aspects were found on an unused Gabriel track titled "Marguerita", which also featured the drum patterns found on "No Self Control" from his 1980 self-titled album.

After originally considering a romantic set of lyrics to accompany the instrumentation of "Wallflower", Gabriel instead took some inspiration from the human rights work of Amnesty International. In an interview with Alan Freeman, Gabriel explained that he decided to orient the lyrics around prisoners of conscience after viewing an Amnesty International television program related to the topic. Gabriel drew from reports about the plights of political prisoners in Europe and Latin America, particularly the multiple arrests of Polish Solidarity leader Lech Wałęsa during martial law and Amnesty International's efforts to free dissidents interred in mental hospitals. The song later became popular amongst Amnesty International workers; Gabriel occasionally prefaced live performances of the song by mentioning the work of Amnesty International.

"Wallflower" was the only song from Gabriel's 1982 eponymous album that was not previewed at the first World of Music, Arts and Dance (WOMAD) festival, which he had co-founded in 1980. He dedicated the song to International Bridges to Justice in 2011 to promote the organization's advocacy for legal protections, including the right to a lawyer.

=== Radiohead's refusal to cover the song ===
In February 2010, Gabriel released Scratch My Back, an album comprising orchestral covers of 12 different musical artists. The concept of this project was to participate in a song exchange; the artists who Gabriel covered on Scratch My Back would record one of his own compositions for the companion album And I'll Scratch Yours. Thom Yorke of Radiohead had contacted Gabriel in advance of Scratch My Back's release to express interest in recording a rendition of "Wallflower" in return for Gabriel covering Radiohead's song "Street Spirit (Fade Out)". In a podcast posted on his website, Gabriel said that he was "very excited" to hear their rendition of "Wallflower".

However, around the time Scratch My Back was released, Gabriel told The Sun that he had not been in contact with Yorke for several months and was unsure if Radiohead would cover "Wallflower" for And I'll Scratch Yours. Gabriel had sent the band a code to access the cover of "Street Spirit" in advance of Scratch My Back's release; the code also provided Gabriel with information on the number of times the band streamed the song, which indicated that they listened to it once. Despite Yorke claiming that he never listened to Gabriel's cover of "Street Spirit", Gabriel said that the band was reportedly displeased with some of the creative liberties he took with the song, which he believed contributed to Radiohead's decision not to cover "Wallflower". When I'll Scratch Yours was released in 2013, "Wallflower" was not included in the track listing.

== Critical reception ==
Adam Sweeting of Melody Maker described "Wallflower" as an "ode to political prisoners, prisoners of conscience, [and] anyone behind bars." While Sweeting said that the song was "not badly done", he questioned the grandiosity of the composition and believed that it would better serve as a diary entry rather than a commercial release for the public. In his book Without Frontiers: The Life and Music of Peter Gabriel, Daryl Easlea said that "Wallflower" was "one of Gabriel's most beautiful and overlooked ballads". Tim Bowness of Louder Sound described the song as a "hymnal highlight" with a "claustrophobic and poignant prisoner of conscience narrative."

== Personnel ==
- Peter Gabriel – lead and backing vocals, Fairlight CMI, Prophet-5, piano
- David Rhodes – electric guitar
- Tony Levin – bass guitar
- Larry Fast – Prophet-5
- David Lord – Fairlight CMI, piano
- Jerry Marotta – drums
