= Big Blue Ball =

2008 compilation album by multiple artists

Studio album by Big Blue Ball (Peter Gabriel and various artists)
- Released: June 24, 2008
- Recorded: 1991–2007
- Studios: Real World, Box, UK
- Genre: World
- Length: 59:01
- Labels: Real World; Rykodisc
- Producers: Peter Gabriel; Karl Wallinger; Stephen Hague

Peter Gabriel chronology
Hit (2003)	Big Blue Ball (2008)	Scratch My Back (2010)

Alternative cover

Professional ratings
Review scores
Source	Rating
AllMusic	3/5 stars
Rolling Stone	3/5 stars

Big Blue Ball is an album by multiple artists which "grew from 3 recording weeks" at Peter Gabriel's Real World Studios in the summers of 1991, 1992, and 1995. It is Peter Gabriel's fourteenth album project overall.

== Background ==
In production for more than 18 years, "Big Blue Ball" is a project featuring several artists from all around the world working together. Gabriel said that although the initial recording was finished by 1995, "the tapes were left in a mess and it's taken this long to sort out." Producer Stephen Hague was finally called in to sort out the project.

Guests on the album include Wendy Melvoin of Wendy & Lisa, Sinéad O'Connor, Karl Wallinger (of World Party), Natacha Atlas, and Papa Wemba. Gabriel takes the lead vocals on several tracks on the album. A mix of western, African, and Asian musicians are also included.

Big Blue Ball was launched in the United States in June, 24th, 2008. The European premiere took place 13 days previously on June, 11th, 2008 in the city of Aachen, Germany in collaboration with the Ludwig Forum Museum of Modern Art and the city's cultural director Richard Takvorian. "After all these years, it's a fine wine ready to be drunk," says Peter Gabriel, "It was the most fun music making I've ever had." It was released thanks to a venture-capital trust initiative. Bosses at London-based firm Ingenious raised more than $4 million (£2 million) to help promote the release in the US. The venture capitalists, Gabriel, and his Real World Limited partners, created a new joint venture company, High Level Recordings Limited, to oversee the release of the album. The new album deal covers the North America territory, where Gabriel is currently out of contract. The worldwide distribution of the album will be dealt by Proper Music Distribution.

The first track released from the project was "Whole Thing", included on the soundtrack album for the TV series Long Way Down. A version of "Burn You Up, Burn You Down" was also included on Gabriel's 2003 compilation album Hit, with a radio edit released as a single.

There are two CD editions of the album with different covers; the music is the same on both.

A limited edition of 1000 copies of the album was released on blue vinyl, from Rykodisc.

The digital download versions of the album contain different bonus content depending on the country. UK download stores include the track "Whole Thing (Adrian Sherwood & Jazzwad Remix)". US download stores include the track "Habibe (Stefan Goodchild Remix)" and a digital booklet. Both versions include the "Story of the Big Blue Ball, Pt. 1" video.

== Track listing ==
No.	Title	Writer(s)	Length
1.	"Whole Thing" (original mix) (featuring Francis Bebey, Alex Faku, Tim Finn, Peter Gabriel, Karl Wallinger, Andy White)	Alexis Faku, Tim Finn, Peter Gabriel, Geoffrey Oryema, Karl Wallinger & Andy White	5:27
2.	"Habibe" (featuring Natacha Atlas, Hossam Ramzy, Neil Sparkes, The Hossam Ramzy Egyptian Ensemble [Adel Eskander, Wael Abu Bakr, Momtaz Talaat])	Natacha Atlas, Hossam Ramzy, Vernon Reid, Neil Sparkes	7:12
3.	"Shadow" (featuring Juan Manuel Cañizares, Papa Wemba)	Juan Manuel Cañizares, Peter Gabriel, Karl Wallinger, Shungu Wembadio	4:28
4.	"Altus Silva" (featuring Joseph Arthur, Ronan Browne, Deep Forest, James McNally, Iarla Ó Lionáird, Vernon Reid; Altus Silva is Latin for "Deep Forest", whose members provided the keyboards for the piece)	Joseph Arthur, Ronan Browne, James McNally, Eric Mouquet, Iarla Ó Lionáird & Michel Sanchez	6:07
5.	"Exit Through You" (featuring Joseph Arthur, Peter Gabriel, Karl Wallinger)	Joseph Arthur & Peter Gabriel	5:52
6.	"Everything Comes from You" (featuring Richard Evans, Joji Hirota, Sevara Nazarkhan, Sinéad O'Connor, Guo Yue)	Joji Hirota & Sinéad O'Connor	4:42
7.	"Burn You Up, Burn You Down" (featuring Billy Cobham, Peter Gabriel, The Holmes Brothers, Wendy Melvoin, Arona N'Diaye, Jah Wobble)	Peter Gabriel, Neil Sparkes & Karl Wallinger	4:30
8.	"Forest" (featuring Levon Minassian, Arona N'Diaye, Vernon Reid, Hukwe Zawose)	Levon Minassian, Arona N'Diaye, Chuck Norman & Hukwe Zawose	6:16
9.	"Rivers" (featuring Vernon Reid, Márta Sebestyén, Karl Wallinger)	Márta Sebestyén	5:45
10.	"Jijy" (featuring Arona N'Diaye, Rossy, Jah Wobble)	Peter Gabriel, Rossy, Karl Wallinger & Jah Wobble	4:00
11.	"Big Blue Ball" (featuring Peter Gabriel, Manu Katché, Karl Wallinger)	Karl Wallinger	4:52

Bonus tracks
No.	Title	Length
12.	"Habibe" (Stefan Goodchild remix) (US digital download bonus track)
13.	"Whole Thing" (Adrian Sherwood & Jazzwad remix) (UK digital download bonus track)
14.	"Story of the Big Blue Ball, Pt. 1" (digital download bonus video)

== Personnel ==
Produced by Peter Gabriel, Steven Hague and Karl Wallinger. Original recordings produced by Peter Gabriel and Karl Wallinger except "Altus silva" by Eric Mouquet and Michel Sanchez. Mixed by Tchad Blake except "Habibe" by Stephen Hague and "Everything Comes from You" by Richard Chappell.

1. "Whole Thing" (original mix)

- Lead vocal, keyboards: Peter Gabriel
- Guitars: Karl Wallinger, Paul Allen
- Nord brass, backing vocals: Alex Faku
- Flutes: Francis Bebey
- Backing vocals: Tim Finn, Andy White
- Programming: Chuck Norman
- Toms: Tchad Blake

Published by Gallo Music Publishers/Mushroom Music Pty/Real World Music Ltd/WOMAD Music Ltd/Universal Music Publishing/Reverb Music Ltd

2. "Habibe"

- Vocals: Natacha Atlas
- Drums and percussion: Hossam Ramzy, Neil Sparkes
- Strings: The Hossam Ramzy Egyptian Ensemble (Wael Abu Bakr, Adel Eskander, Momtaz Talaat)
- Saz: Tim Whelan
- Keyboards: Stephen Hague
- Programming: Chuck Norman

Published by Annie Reed Music/Hossam Ramzy PRS, MCPS & PAMRA/copyright control/Real World Music Ltd

3. "Shadow"

- Vocals: Papa Wemba
- Backing vocals: Reddy Amisi
- Guitar: Juan Manuel Cañizares
- Percussion: The Papa Wemba Band, Alan Gyorffy
- Bongos: Laurent Coatalen
- Frame drums: Tchad Blake

Published by JMC Music Productions S.L./Real World Music Ltd/Universal Music Publishing/Real World Works Ltd

4. "Altus silva"

- Vocals: Joseph Arthur, Iarla Ó Lionáird
- Bass: Noel Ekwabi
- Conga: The Papa Wemba Band
- Piano, keyboards: Eric Mouquet and Michel Sanchez
- Guitar synth: Vernon Reid
- Whistle, low whistle: James McNally
- Uilleann pipes: Ronan Browne
- Programming: Chuck Norman
- Keyboards, harmonium and flute like body bells: Tchad Blake

Published by Real World Music Ltd/ WOMAD Music Ltd/Editions La Paya (Catalogue YEAA Music)/Michel Sanchez Music (MSM)

5. "Exit Through You"

- Vocals: Joseph Arthur, Peter Gabriel
- Guitar: Joseph Arthur, Karl Wallinger
- Bass: Peter Gabriel
- Keyboards: Peter Gabriel
- Backing Vocals: Justin Adams, Karl Wallinger
- Programming: Chuck Norman
- Shaker, tambourine, bass: Tchad Blake

Published by Real World Music Ltd

6. "Everything Comes from You"

- Vocals: Sinead O'Connor
- Backing vocals: Sevara Nazarkhan
- Drums, percussion, Chinese drum: Joji Hirota
- Drums: Ged Lynch
- Flutes: Guo Yue
- Keyboards: Rupert Hine
- Piano: Angie Pollock
- Guitar, mandolin and recorder: Richard Evans

Published by WOMAD Music Ltd/EMI Music Publishing

7. "Burn You Up, Burn You Down"

- Vocals, keyboards: Peter Gabriel
- Backing vocals: The Holmes Brothers: Wendell, Sherman & Popsi; Jules Shear; Karl Wallinger
- Guitar: Justin Adams, David Rhodes
- Bass: Jah Wobble, Wendy Melvoin
- Djembe, sabar: Arona N'Diaye
- Drums: Billy Cobham
- Programming: Chuck Norman
- Guitar synth, organ, skin shake, hi hat, frame drum: Tchad Blake

Published by Real World Music/Universal Publishing Ltd

8. "Forest"

- Vocals: Hukwe Zawose
- Guitar: Vernon Reid
- Percussion: Arona N'Diaye
- Doudouk: Levon Minassian
- Programming: Chuck Norman and Stephen Hague

Published by Explorians/Copyright Control/WOMAD Music Ltd

9. "Rivers"

- Lead vocal, flute: Marta Sebestyen
- Bass: Karl Wallinger
- Drones, river pad, general programming: Chuck Norman
- Guitar synth: Vernon Reid
- Accordion: Stephen Hague
- Drones: Peter Gabriel

Published by Kismet Bt.

10. "Jijy"

- Vocals: Rossy
- Programming: Chuck Norman and Stephen Hague
- Percussion: Arona N'Diaye
- Drums and vibes: Alan Gyorffy
- Bass: Jah Wobble

Published by Real World Music Ltd/Heaven Music PRS MCPS/Universal Music Publishing/Copyright Control

11. "Big Blue Ball"

- Vocals, acoustic guitar, bass, keyboards: Karl Wallinger
- Piano, organ, keyboards, solo keyboards: Peter Gabriel
- Drums: Manu Katché
- Accordion: Stephen Hague
- Programming: Chuck Norman
- Kick drum, bells: Tchad Blake

Published by Universal Music Publishing
