= Hit FM =

Hit FM or Hits FM may refer to any of the following radio stations:

== Hit FM ==
- CRI Hit FM, a defunct radio station in China
- HIT FM Denmark
- 99.5 Hit FM, now DWRT-FM, in the Philippines
- Hit FM (Russia)
- Hit FM (Taiwan)
- Hit FM (Ukraine)

== Hits FM ==
- Hits FM (Madrid), in Spain
- Hits FM (Nepal)
