= The Hits Collection =

The Hits Collection may refer to:

- The Hits Collection (video), a 1993 video album by Prince
- The Hits Collection (Kim Wilde album), a 2006 compilation album by Kim Wilde
- The Hits Collection, a 2000 compilation album by Cameo
- The Hits Collection, Volume One, a 2010 compilation album by Jay-Z

== See also ==
- Hits Collection (disambiguation)
