= Birdy (Peter Gabriel album) =

Soundtrack album by Peter Gabriel
- Released: 18 March 1985
- Recorded: October–December 1984
- Studios: Ashcombe House (Swainswick, Somerset)
- Genres: Ambient; rock; sound collage
- Length: 35:42
- Labels: Geffen (US & Canada); Charisma
- Producers: Peter Gabriel and Daniel Lanois

Peter Gabriel chronology
Plays Live (1983)	Birdy (1985)	So (1986)

Birdy is the first soundtrack and sixth album overall by the English rock musician Peter Gabriel for the movie of the same name, released in 1985. The album marked Gabriel's first work with producer Daniel Lanois. It was remastered with most of Gabriel's catalogue in 2002.

== Background ==
In addition to composing new pieces for the soundtrack, Gabriel also used instrumental themes and sections from earlier works to form the basis of some tracks. Of the album's twelve tracks, two adapt music from Gabriel's third album and three adapt music from Gabriel's fourth album. There are, however, no songs with lyrics on the album. Gabriel recorded the album over the course of six weeks.

In an interview with Spin in 1986, Gabriel said, “Birdy was about the struggle of the spirit... It was about the interplay between the traumatized Birdy, the wounded victim, and his best friend, who’s ostensibly the tough one. But in the end, it’s Birdy who’s strong and his friend who’s cracking. When I saw the rough cut of the film, I knew I had to do it. It haunted me.” He said in a 1989 interview published in Musician magazine that Birdy sold around 100,000 copies.

Recalling his experience of working with Gabriel, Birdy director Alan Parker told Prog magazine in 2010, "We got on so well, he’s such a sweet man. It was such a refreshing change from working with megalomaniacs like Roger Waters. Peter’s record company were very difficult to begin with, and so I phoned them to ask if they’d mind if Peter took a little time to do this, and they said as long as it didn’t take more than a couple of months because Peter was already a year late or something. He had strong views and I would never be able to persuade him to do something he didn’t feel comfortable with, but we didn’t have any confrontation as such."

== Reception ==
Professional ratings
Review scores
Source	Rating
AllMusic	4/5 stars
Encyclopedia of Popular Music	2/5 stars
The Great Rock Discography	6/10
The Rolling Stone Album Guide	3.5/5 stars

Released 18 March 1985, Birdy reached number 51 on the UK Albums Chart and number 162 on the US Billboard 200. The commercial performance exemplified Gabriel's strong cult following, according to biographer Daryl Easlea (2018), adding that the chart peaks are "still pretty impressive for what is essentially an album of sound collages." In their review, Rolling Stone noted the album's prioritisation of "mood over melodic content".

In a retrospective review, Tom Demalon of AllMusic felt the album was a "successful companion piece" to Parker's film, providing a "moody and evocative" backdrop. He noted many of the tracks incorporate threads from Peter Gabriel's fourth album (1982) and warned that the album would disappoint listeners expecting Gabriel's more pop-leaning material, but said "its meditative nature makes it fine, reflective listening for the more adventurous." Steven Grant and Ira Robbins, writing for Trouser Press, also drew attention to the mix of new material and adaptations of earlier recordings, and felt that "[a]lthough it's uncommon to hear sustained instrumental work from someone so known for vocal music, the score is audibly identifiable, and provides a fascinating glimpse into his adaptational thinking." They described it as "[a] strongly affecting work, a major challenge met admirably with style and character."

Colin Larkin described it as a "haunting soundtrack" in The Encyclopedia of Popular Music, whilst in The Great Rock Discography, Martin C. Strong wrote how Gabriel transformed earlier material into "atmospheric mood pieces" with "impressive effect". Birdy was reissued on vinyl in 2017; reviewing the release for Uncut, John Lewis described Birdy as "interesting but fragmentary" but highlighted "Birdy's Flight" for being a heavy, drum-laden instrumental based on "Not One of Us". He also noted the album's significance, saying: "Many of the techniques explored on Birdy – particularly the experiments with ambient sound on 'Dressing the Wound' and 'Sketchpad with Trumpet and Voice' – would lay the groundwork for So, and both projects certainly shared many of the same personnel."

== Track listing ==
All songs written by Peter Gabriel.

Side One
No.	Title	Length
1.	"At Night"	2:38
2.	"Floating Dogs"	2:55
3.	"Quiet and Alone"	2:30
4.	"Close Up" (from "Family Snapshot")	0:55
5.	"Slow Water"	2:51
6.	"Dressing the Wound"	4:06

Side Two
No.	Title	Length
7.	"Birdy's Flight" (from "Not One of Us")	2:58
8.	"Slow Marimbas"	3:21
9.	"The Heat" (from "The Rhythm of the Heat")	4:41
10.	"Sketch Pad with Trumpet and Voice"	3:05
11.	"Under Lock and Key" (from "Wallflower")	2:28
12.	"Powerhouse at the Foot of the Mountain" (from "San Jacinto")	2:19

== Personnel ==
- Peter Gabriel – keyboards, production
- Jon Hassell – trumpet
- Ekome Dance Company – drums
- Larry Fast – keyboards
- Tony Levin – bass guitar, double bass, backing vocals
- Jerry Marotta – drums, percussion
- David Rhodes – guitar, backing vocals
- Manny Elias – drums
- Morris Pert – drums, percussion
- John Giblin – double bass, bass guitar

=== Technical personnel ===
- David Stallbaumer – additional engineering

== Charts ==
Chart (1985)	Peak position
Canada Top Albums/CDs (RPM)	91
Swedish Albums (Sverigetopplistan)	30
UK Albums (Official Charts)	51
US Billboard 200	162

== In popular culture ==
The piece "Birdy's Flight" was later used by Hong Kong film director John Woo as part of the score to his A Better Tomorrow films. Other parts of the score were used in Tsui Hark's 1986 movie Peking Opera Blues. The track "The Heat" was used in 1994 Movie Natural Born Killers and in the theatrical trailer of the 1993 movie Tombstone.
