= New Blood (Peter Gabriel album) =

Studio album of re-recordings by Peter Gabriel
- Released: 10 October 2011
- Recorded: 2010
- Studios: Real World (Wiltshire); Ladbroke Temple (Notting Hill); AIR Lyndhurst (London); Studio IndieKing (Stockholm)
- Length: 77:41
- Label: Real World/Virgin
- Producers: Peter Gabriel; John Metcalfe

Peter Gabriel chronology
Scratch My Back (2010)	New Blood (2011)	Live Blood (2012)

Deluxe edition cover

New Blood is the ninth studio album (and sixteenth album overall) by the English rock musician Peter Gabriel, released on 10 October 2011. The album consists of orchestral re-recordings of various tracks from Gabriel's career.

== Background ==
The album continues the project Gabriel began with his previous album, Scratch My Back, which comprised orchestral covers of other artists' songs. The idea came about after rearranging Gabriel's songs for orchestra for the second half of shows on the Scratch My Back tour of 2010. For this album Gabriel continued to work with arranger John Metcalfe. He originally planned to rerecord the songs with home-made instruments, but did not find the range and tone of expression available in existing instruments.

"I really didn't want to make this new album all about the hits," Gabriel explained to Mark Blake. "So there's no 'Sledgehammer'... I was unsure at first about 'Red Rain' and about doing 'Don't Give Up' without Kate, but then it felt like it would fit. In the end it worked."

The album features a new song, "A Quiet Moment", which originated in his desire to separate "Solsbury Hill" – remade due to huge demand – from the rest of the album. Originally three minutes of silence were to separate "Solsbury Hill", but it was thought this would confuse people, and Gabriel decided that "A Quiet Moment" would work better.

== Reception ==
Professional ratings
Aggregate scores
Source	Rating
Metacritic	70/100
Review scores
Source	Rating
AllMusic	3.5/5 stars
American Songwriter	2/5 stars
Consequence of Sound	4/5 stars
The Guardian	3/5 stars
The Independent	3/5 stars
MusicOMH	3.5/5 stars
Paste	9/10
PopMatters	6/10 stars
Uncut	3/5 stars
USA Today	3/4 stars

In The Independent, Andy Gill gave the album three stars out of five and commented, "The prevailing tones are of awed wonder – the aspirant nobility of Downside Up, the dancing woodwind of San Jacinto and In Your Eyes – or expectant tension, most notably in the emotional storm-surges of Red Rain and The Rhythm of the Heat."

Writing for the Evening Standard, Pete Clark awarded the album four stars out of five and stated, "In typical Gabriel fashion obvious choices have been avoided: no Sledgehammer or Biko here. Instead, he and arranger/composer John Metcalfe have opted for songs that might best benefit from the grown-up treatment. Mostly, it is a great success."

In The Word, David Hepworth stated the album was more successful than Scratch My Back, writing "John Metcalfe's stern string arrangements frame the drama of songs like San Jacinto, In Your Eyes and Red Rain, though there is a tendency for any rhythmic strings to sound like Bernard Hermann soundtracks to Hitchcock movies. Good for an open-topped car ride across the Yorkshire Dales while you're playing hide and seek with the sun."

== Track listing ==
All tracks are written by Peter Gabriel

New Blood track listing
No.	Title	Originally from	Length
1.	"The Rhythm of the Heat"	Peter Gabriel 4 (Security), 1982	5:41
2.	"Downside Up" (featuring Melanie Gabriel)	OVO, 2000	3:52
3.	"San Jacinto"	Peter Gabriel 4 (Security)	6:58
4.	"Intruder"	Peter Gabriel 3, 1980	5:07
5.	"Wallflower"	Peter Gabriel 4 (Security)	6:25
6.	"In Your Eyes"	So, 1986	7:13
7.	"Mercy Street"	So	5:59
8.	"Red Rain"	So	5:16
9.	"Darkness"	Up, 2002	6:10
10.	"Don't Give Up" (featuring Ane Brun)	So	6:40
11.	"Digging in the Dirt"	Us, 1992	4:57
12.	"The Nest That Sailed the Sky"	OVO	3:54
13.	"A Quiet Moment"	Previously unreleased	4:48
14.	"Solsbury Hill" (bonus track)	Peter Gabriel 1, 1977	4:35

=== Bonus tracks ===
Special Edition disc 2
No.	Title	Originally from	Length
1.	"The Rhythm of the Heat" (instrumental)	Peter Gabriel 4 (Security)	5:41
2.	"Downside Up" (instrumental)	OVO	3:52
3.	"San Jacinto" (instrumental)	Peter Gabriel 4 (Security)	7:12
4.	"Intruder" (instrumental)	Peter Gabriel 3	5:06
5.	"Wallflower" (instrumental)	Peter Gabriel 4 (Security)	6:24
6.	"In Your Eyes" (instrumental)	So	7:13
7.	"Mercy Street" (instrumental)	So, 1986	6:00
8.	"Red Rain" (instrumental)	So	5:16
9.	"Darkness" (instrumental)	Up	6:10
10.	"Don't Give Up" (instrumental)	So	6:40
11.	"Digging in the Dirt" (instrumental)	Us	4:58
12.	"The Nest That Sailed the Sky" (instrumental)	OVO	3:54
13.	"Blood of Eden" (bonus track)	Us	6:05

Digital download bonus track
No.	Title	Originally from	Length
1.	"Signal to Noise"	Up	7:46

Digital download bonus track
No.	Title	Originally from	Length
1.	"Father, Son"	OVO	4:10

Deluxe Edition discs 1/2 (New Blood: Live in London)
No.	Title	Originally from	Length
1.	"Intruder"	Peter Gabriel 3	5:59
2.	"Wallflower"	Peter Gabriel 4 (Security)	7:29
3.	"The Boy in the Bubble" (written by Paul Simon & Forere Motloheloa)	Scratch My Back, 2010	4:35
4.	"Après Moi" (written by Regina Spektor)	Scratch My Back	5:16
5.	"The Drop"	Up	2:58
6.	"Washing of the Water"	Us	4:20
7.	"The Book of Love" (written by Stephin Merritt)	Scratch My Back	3:54
8.	"Darkness"	Up	6:34
9.	"The Power of the Heart" (written by Lou Reed)	Scratch My Back	6:36
10.	"Biko"	Peter Gabriel 3	6:54
11.	"San Jacinto"	Peter Gabriel 4 (Security)	7:44
12.	"Digging in the Dirt"	Us	6:01
13.	"Signal to Noise"	Up	8:46
14.	"Downside Up"	OVO	6:29
15.	"Mercy Street"	So	6:47
16.	"The Rhythm of the Heat"	Peter Gabriel 4 (Security)	6:54
17.	"Blood of Eden"	Us	6:31
18.	"Red Rain"	So	7:11
19.	"Solsbury Hill"	Peter Gabriel 1	6:15
20.	"In Your Eyes"	So	8:27
21.	"Don't Give Up"	So	8:32
22.	"The Nest That Sailed the Sky"	OVO	6:48

Deluxe Edition disc 4 (Live Blood – Live Recording)
No.	Title	Originally from	Length
1.	"The Rhythm of the Heat"	Peter Gabriel 4 (Security)	6:47
2.	"Mercy Street"	So	6:11
3.	"Digging in the Dirt"	Us	5:09
4.	"Signal to Noise"	Up	9:39
5.	"Intruder"	Peter Gabriel 3	4:47
6.	"Biko"	Peter Gabriel 3	7:31
7.	"San Jacinto"	Peter Gabriel 4 (Security)	7:43
8.	"Solsbury Hill"	Peter Gabriel 1	6:34
9.	"In Your Eyes" (featuring Sevara Nazarkhan)	So	7:24
10.	"Don't Give Up" (featuring Ane Brun)	So	7:18

== Personnel ==
- Peter Gabriel – production, arrangement
- John Metcalfe – production, arrangement, mixing, orchestration
- Richard Chappell – mixing, engineering
- Scott Barnett – additional engineering
- Mark Claydon – additional engineering
- Steve Orchard – Air Lyndhurst sessions recording
- Olga Fitzroy – Air Lyndhurst sessions recording assistant, Pro Tools editor
- Fiona Cruickshank – Pro Tools editor assistant
- Melanie Gabriel – vocals ("Downside Up")
- Ane Brun – vocals ("Don't Give Up")
- Tom Cawley – vocals
- New Blood Orchestra – orchestra performance
- Tony Cousins – mastering
- Marc Bessant – design
- Steve Gschmeissner – cover photograph

== Charts ==
=== Weekly charts ===
Chart (2011)	Peak position
Australian Albums (ARIA)	64
Austrian Albums (Ö3 Austria)	19
Belgian Albums (Ultratop Flanders)	11
Belgian Albums (Ultratop Wallonia)	2
Canadian Albums (Billboard)	9
Danish Albums (Hitlisten)	31
Dutch Albums (Album Top 100)	12
Finnish Albums (Suomen virallinen lista)	39
French Albums (SNEP)	12
German Albums (Offizielle Top 100)	6
Irish Albums (IRMA)	42
Italian Albums (FIMI)	6
Norwegian Albums (VG-lista)	13
Polish Albums Chart	14
Portuguese Albums (AFP)	41
Scottish Albums (Official Charts)	21
Spanish Albums (Promusicae)	26
Swedish Albums (Sverigetopplistan)	19
Swiss Albums (Schweizer Hitparade)	11
UK Albums (Official Charts)	22
US Billboard 200	30
US Top Alternative Albums (Billboard)	6
US Top Rock Albums (Billboard)	9

=== Year-end charts ===
Chart (2011)	Position
Belgian Albums (Ultratop Wallonia)	75
