= Homicide Investigation Tracking System =

Homicide Investigation Tracking System (HITS) is a violent crime database program of the Washington State Office of the Attorney General. The system tracks homicides and rapes in and/or relating to the states of Washington and Oregon and also receives data from at least three other states and Canada. The database provides information on over 14,000 murders and over 10,000 sexual assaults to local law enforcement agencies as well as advice and assistance in ongoing investigations. Notable cases that have been assisted by HITS include Gary Ridgway (also known as the Green River Killer), John Allen Muhammad and Lee Boyd Malvo (the Beltway snipers), and serial killer Robert Lee Yates.
