= Hits FM (Madrid) =

Hits FM is a popular radio station based in Madrid, Spain. It is now available 24 hours daily on 93.7 MHz. It also broadcasts on the Internet. It plays mainly English and Spanish hits. The past programs from Hits FM can now also be found on its official website as podcast.
