= Hits: Greatest and Others =

Greatest hits album by Joan Baez
- Released: 1973
- Label: Vanguard

Hits: Greatest and Others was a 1973 compilation Vanguard put together at the end of Joan Baez' association with their label. In addition to her hit cover of The Band's "The Night They Drove Old Dixie Down", songs by the Beatles and Kris Kristofferson were also included. Unlike previous compilations, this one skipped over most of Baez' earlier traditional material almost entirely, in favor of her more recent singer-songwriter material and covers.

== Track listing ==
1. "The Night They Drove Old Dixie Down" (Robbie Robertson)
2. "Dangling Conversation" (Paul Simon)
3. "Help Me Make It Through the Night" (Kris Kristofferson)
4. "Blessed Are..." (Joan Baez)
5. "Eleanor Rigby" (John Lennon/Paul McCartney)
6. "Let It Be" (John Lennon/Paul McCartney)
7. "There but for Fortune" (Phil Ochs)
8. "The Brand New Tennessee Waltz" (Jesse Winchester)
9. "I Pity the Poor Immigrant" (Bob Dylan)
10. "Love Is Just a Four-Letter Word" (Bob Dylan)
11. "Heaven Help Us All" (Ronald Miller)

"Heaven Help Us All" is a 1970 soul single composed by Ron Miller and first performed by Motown singer Stevie Wonder.
