= Father, Son =

Song by Peter Gabriel

from the album OVO
- Released: 2000
- Studio: Real World (Wiltshire)
- Length: 4:55
- Label: Real World
- Songwriter: Peter Gabriel
- Producers: Peter Gabriel; Simon Emmerson; Brian Transeau

Music video
- "Father, Son" on YouTube

"Father, Son" is a song written and recorded by English musician Peter Gabriel. It is the seventh track on Gabriel's soundtrack album OVO, which was released in 2000 as the commissioned work to the Millennium Dome Show. Whereas several songs on OVO were sung by different vocalists, "Father, Son" is one of the few songs on the album where Gabriel handled lead vocals. Gabriel wrote the song as a tribute to his father and later played it at his funeral per his request. He later wrote a song in memoriam of his mother, "And Still", which appeared on his 2023 I/O album.

A music video was created for "Father, Son", which was directed by Peter's eldest daughter, Anna Gabriel. Since the song's release, Gabriel performed "Father, Son" on several of his concert tours. It has also appeared on some of Gabriel's live and compilation albums.

== Background ==
"Father, Son" was conceived a few years before Gabriel was asked to write a score for the Millennium Dome Show. He thought that the themes of "Father, Son", which related to inter-generational relationships, aligned with his vision for the soundtrack and decided to record the song for OVO. Gabriel wrote "Father, Son" as a tribute to his father Ralph, who was in his eighties at the time of the song's composition. Ralph Gabriel was formerly a technician and inventor who secured around seven different patents, including one for the Dial-a-Program in 1971, which was the first fiber-optic cable-TV system. Gabriel recalled in a 1986 interview with Spin that "the patent only lasted for fifteen years, and the potential of cable TV was hardly recognized at the time. A lot of brilliant study was not made use of or capitalized on—extremely frustrating for my father." Gabriel wrote the song after arranging a holiday to get closer with his father.

My dad is getting old now, and I felt I hadn't really bonded with him as much as I had wanted. Since he's been into yoga for 40 years, I thought we could get a yoga teacher and go off to a hotel for a week together. It took a lot of courage internally for me to organise that, but he was very up for it. And we had a big breakthrough at one point so I thought, 'I'll put this into a song'. It seemed to touch people. I think when you've provided an emotional tool for yourself in a song, you're more likely to provide it for other people too.

— Peter Gabriel

Before the song was released, Richard Evans, who worked with Gabriel on OVO, said that the song made "every bloke we've played it to cry." Upon hearing "Father, Son", Ralph Gabriel requested that Peter play the song at his funeral. After Ralph died in 2012 at the age of 100, Gabriel performed the song at his service in St Lawrence Church on November 16. Peter's former bandmate in Genesis, Tony Banks, was in attendance at the funeral and said that Gabriel's performance was "very moving." Within the story of OVO, which is divided into three parts, "Father, Son" is the final song in Act 1, a portion of the plot representing the agricultural era. Musically, "Father, Son" is largely built around Gabriel's piano and vocals, with additional instrumentation of brass and synthesisers. The Black Dyke Band was invited to overdub brass to the existing piano and vocals tracks that Gabriel recorded.

== Music video ==
A music video for "Father Son" was directed by Gabriel's eldest daughter Anna. Anna had previously filmed the Growing Up on Tour - A Family Portrait, which contained behind-the-scenes footage from Gabriel's Growing Up Tour. After she completed the filming of the documentary, Anna showed her father the music video that she prepared for "Father, Son". The video includes Gabriel singing and playing at the piano, which is accompanied by grainy black-and-white footage of Gabriel walking with his father and practicing yoga with him. Gabriel's son Isaac also appears in the music video alongside Peter and Ralph. Gabriel called the music video a "low budget affair" and said that his daughter Anna "captured quite a lot of the emotion of the song."

The music video for "Father, Son" was posted on Gabriel's website following the death of his father in 2012. It also appeared on his Play DVD compilation, which contained 23 of Gabriel's music videos mixed in Dolby Digital 5.1 surround sound.

== Live performances and other versions ==
Gabriel debuted "Father, Son" on his Growing Up Tour in 2002-03, where it served either as the first or final song of the set depending on the performance. The staging for "Father, Son" lacked the same theatrics found elsewhere in the setlist and featured accompaniment from Tony Levin on bass. It was also retained in the setlist for his Still Growing Up Tour in 2004. A live recording taken from the May 2003 performance at the Forum di Milano in Italy was included on the Growing Up: Live concert film and DVD.

"Father, Son" was included on Gabriel's 2004 Hit compilation album, which contained a mixture of singles and deeper cuts from Gabriel's discography. This version was remixed by Daniel Lanois and Richard Chappell, which was initially included on the CD compilation Entrata/Uscita. In 2019, the remixed version appeared on the digital-exclusive Flotsam and Jetsam compilation. Gabriel recorded an orchestral version of "Father, Son", which was made available as a digital download bonus track for his New Blood album.

The song appears in the 2006 animated comedy Barnyard, and later appeared on its corresponding soundtrack.

== Personnel ==
- Peter Gabriel – vocals, piano, synthesizer, brass arrangements
- Tony Levin – bass
- Black Dyke Band – brass
- Will Gregory – brass arrangements
- Elizabeth Purnell – brass orchestration
- James Watson – conducting
- Richard Evans – mixing
