= Love to Be Loved =

Song by Peter Gabriel

from the album Us
- Released: 1992
- Length: 5:18
- Label: Real World
- Songwriter: Peter Gabriel
- Producers: Peter Gabriel; Daniel Lanois

"Love to Be Loved" is a song written and recorded by English musician Peter Gabriel. It is the second track on Gabriel's studio album Us, which was released in 1992. Gabriel based the song's subject matter on his motivation to feel wanted and loved. The song was rehearsed for Gabriel's 1993–94 Secret World Tour and was ultimately performed live on a few occasions.

== Background and composition ==
The origins of "Love to Be Loved" date back a few years prior to the release of Us, when Gabriel wrote the lines "Liked to be liked / Need to be needed / Want to be wanted and loved to be loved". From there, Gabriel assembled the song around those lyrical ideas. The song centers around Gabriel's exploration of his emotions and his wish to being desired. Gabriel had undergone therapy in the years leading up to Us and felt that he had "a tendency to deaden the emotion", prompting him to address these issues in group therapy sessions.

When discussing the song's lyrical themes, Gabriel assessed that "a lot of examination is put on the giving side of love, and less on the neediness" and expressed his preference of emphasising one's personal needs before providing that same comfort to others. He further added that the song's title could be interpreted as an appreciation for love or the concept of providing love to receive love.

== Recording ==
The music of "Love to Be Loved" contains elements of soft rock, blues and R&B with instrumentation consisting of an active bassline, subdued guitars, soft keyboards, and various percussion instruments including a tabla played by Hossam Ramzy, who had previously worked with Gabriel on his 1989 soundtrack album, Passion. Gabriel played an instrument from Madagascar called the valiha, which he described as "a big chunk of bamboo that has bicycle brake wires going up the side of it". During the song's bridge, most of the instrumentation drops out with the exception of keyboards and an instrument resembling a bass drum. This later transitions into a more layered arrangement with additional percussion, strings and keyboards, during which Gabriel transitions into a higher vocal register. The song then concludes with a sustained chord and a metallic percussion effect.

During the recording sessions for Us, Gabriel and Daniel Lanois met with Bill Dillon at one of Lanois' recording studios in New Orleans to work on some guitar ideas. Dillon collaborated with them on roughly six songs over the course of one week, of which "Love to Be Loved" was among the two tracks from those sessions that ultimately appeared on Us. He remembered playing a Guild Starfire VI guitar with an MXR compressor/limiter, a volume pedal, and a Boss delay effects unit, although he is credited with a Stratocaster in the liner notes for Us. Dillon recalled that he recorded a guitar take where he gently brushed the guitar strings with a more rhythmic focus, which Gabriel and Lanois approved of. He remembered that his nervousness contributed to what he considered to be an unobtrusive guitar part. Particular attention was placed on Gabriel's lead vocals. According to Dave Bottrill, who served as a recording engineer, the lead vocals were a composite of roughly 40 different takes, which were then pieced together for the final product.

== Artwork ==
Gabriel invited Finbar Kelly to create the artwork for "Love to Be Loved", which was later included in the liner notes for Us and exhibited at the London Contemporary Art Fair in 1993. Kelly designed a mixed media work with a set of found objects, including a walking stick, which functioned as talisman within the context of the piece. He commented that the cloth represented the "private feelings of sexuality" and also invoked the imagery of a shroud and flag. Over the course of one week, Kelly spent time selecting, rearranging and manipulating the configuration of items so that they would align with his conception of the song's lyrics and music. The final product comprises a tapestry, a bucket with a bowl of eggs, and the walking stick.

== Personnel ==
- Peter Gabriel – vocals, keyboards, programming, percussion, valiha
- David Rhodes – guitar
- Bill Dillon – Stratocaster
- Tony Levin – bass
- Brian Eno – additional keyboards
- Manu Katché – electronic drums
- Daryl Johnson – hand drum
- Hossam Ramzy – tabla
- L. Shankar – violin
- Caroline Lavelle – cello, string arrangement
- Wil Malone – string arrangement
- Jonny Dollar – string arrangement
- David Bottrill – programming
