= San Jacinto (song) =

Song by Peter Gabriel

from the album Peter Gabriel
- Released: 1982
- Genre: Progressive rock
- Length: 6:21
- Label: Charisma; Geffen
- Songwriter: Peter Gabriel
- Producers: David Lord and Peter Gabriel

"San Jacinto" is a song written and performed by the English rock musician Peter Gabriel. Released in 1982, it is the second track off his fourth self-titled album. Prior to the release of this album, an alternate version of "San Jacinto" had appeared on the Music and Rhythm album, which was assembled to promote the first World of Music, Arts and Dance (WOMAD) festival that year. Excerpts of the song’s coda were repurposed for "Powerhouse at the Foot of the Mountain" on Gabriel's 1985 Birdy soundtrack album. He also re-recorded "San Jacinto" with an orchestra on his New Blood album in 2011.

A portion of "San Jacinto" appeared in Starship, a 1984 science fiction film directed by Roger Christian. In 1990, an extended version of the song was included on Gabriel's Shaking the Tree: Sixteen Golden Greats compilation album.

== Background ==
Gabriel wrote "San Jacinto" after an encounter with an Apache man looking for a ride back to his flat. The Apache man was employed at the same hotel Gabriel and his band were staying at and recently learned that his flat had burned down. Upon hearing this, Gabriel agreed to transport the Apache man to his destination. During their ride, the Apache man revealed that he was more concerned about the condition of his cat than his apartment, which impressed Gabriel. The Apache person later described how he was initiated into his tribe, which Gabriel later recounted.

He was taken into the mountains with this sort of shaman character, a medicine man, and he was carrying a rattlesnake in his bag, and the medicine man took it out and held it to the boy's arm and the snake bit him. And if he came down again from the mountain after fourteen days he was a brave, and if he didn’t he was dead. Apparently nearly all of them got through it, and he was describing the way they hallucinate really strongly during that period.

Further inspiration was taken from a trip Gabriel took while driving through Arizona and Palm Springs. During the drive, Gabriel noticed that some of the Native American land was supplanted by discos and restaurants. "There wasn't a whole lot of respect for the real culture there, just the commercial aspect of it." The song's title refers to the San Jacinto Mountains, a mountain range located in California that overlooks Native American reservations, including some situated in Palm Springs. As Gabriel was climbing the mountain, he noticed that some of the trees were adorned with ribbons, which he reckoned were associated with a Native American initiation process. This observation served as the impetus for the creation of "San Jacinto".

The lyrics pertain to a young individual undertaking a rite of passage led by a medicine man, who takes the youth into the mountains and exposes him to a snake bite. References to American commercialism and its encroachment on Native American land are mentioned, including discos and steakhouses, which the youth leaves behind as he traverses further up the mountain. The fictional locations of Geronimo Disco and Sit 'N' Bull Steakhouse invoked in the song reference Apache military leader Geronimo and Lakota leader Sitting Bull, demonstrating the cultural appropriation of Native American culture.

== Recording ==
Larry Fast, who played synthesizers on the song, commented that Gabriel constructed "San Jacinto" using sampled sounds on the Fairlight CMI. Gabriel loaded a sample of a marimba into the Fairlight, which he used to play an ostinato in (5/8) time; this was layered on top of wind-like synthesizer part in (7/16) time. These patterns overlap throughout the song, which is set in common time. In total, the track features nine different marimba sequences played on the Fairlight. Each note of the sequence was selected and played by Gabriel onto a Studer 24 track machine and later converted into a sequence on Page R of the Fairlight.

Gabriel took some inspiration from Steve Reich's "Music for 18 Musicians", a composition that also influenced the creation of "No Self Control" from Gabriel's previous album. For the song's synth orchestration, Fast layered a Moog synthesiser with a Prophet-5 through various outboard effects. During the final section of "San Jacinto", all of the instruments drop out with the exception of sampled voices and a blown drainpipe recorded at a scrapyard, which Gabriel triggered through the Fairlight.

== Critical reception ==
Along with "The Rhythm of the Heat", Louder characterised "San Jacinto" as one of Gabriel's most ambitious compositions. Adam Sweeting of Melody Maker said that the song's "wild fastness" was rewarding. Author Durrell Bowman called "San Jacinto" a "key album track" and highlighted the song's lyrics, saying that they "contrast the artificial world in part of California - of celebrity mansions, golf courses, and swimming pools" with impoverished Native American reservations. Paste and Rolling Stone ranked the song number ten and nine respectively on their lists of the greatest Peter Gabriel songs. Tony Banks, a former bandmate of Gabriel’s through Genesis, labeled "San Jacinto" as one of his favorite Peter Gabriel songs.

== Live performances ==
Prior to the song's official release, "San Jacinto" was previewed at the first World of Music, Arts and Dance (WOMAD) festival in 1982, which was co-founded by Gabriel two years prior. In 1983, a live performance from Gabriel's Playtime 1988 tour was included on Gabriel's Plays Live album. Gabriel performed the song in a 30 minute set for A Conspiracy of Hope, a series of benefit concerts for Amnesty International in 1986. A year later, Gabriel included the song in his setlist for his This Way Up tour; a recording taken from an October 1987 performance at the Lycabettus theater in Athens was included on his Live in Athens album in 2020. The song was also included on Gabriel's Secret World Tour and his Secret World Live concert film. It was also released on his SW Live EP (1994) in some regions.

In 2005, Gabriel included a live performance of the song on his Still Growing Up: Live and Unwrapped DVD film, which comprised material from the second leg of his tour promoting the release of Up in 2002. David Rhodes, who first joined Gabriel's touring band in 1986, commented that for certain live performances, he took one of the sequenced keyboard sounds found on the original recording and played the repeating figure on his guitar; Rhodes said that he "derive[d] great pleasure from playing a little repetitive part".

Gabriel performed the song live with an orchestra to promote his New Blood album in 2011. During these performances, which was documented on the Live Blood album/DVD, Gabriel shined a beam of light into the audience at the conclusion of the song. "San Jacinto" was rehearsed for the i/o tour in 2023, but the song was ultimately cut from the setlist.

== Personnel ==
Credits from the album’s liner notes.

- Peter Gabriel – vocals, Fairlight CMI, Linn LM-1 programming, additional drums
- David Rhodes – guitar
- John Ellis – guitar
- Tony Levin – Chapman stick
- Larry Fast – Moog brass, Prophet-5
- Jerry Marotta – drums
- Jill Gabriel – backing vocals
