= Play (Peter Gabriel video) =

Peter Gabriel: Play The Videos

Video by Peter Gabriel
- Released: 16 November 2004
- Recorded: 1977–1994, 2000, 2002
- Genre: Pop rock, art rock, progressive rock, college rock
- Length: 141 mins
- Label: Rhino Entertainment Company
- Director: Various

Peter Gabriel chronology
| Growing Up Live (2003) | Peter Gabriel: Play The Videos (2004) | Growing Up On Tour A Family Portrait (2004) |

Play: The Videos is a compilation DVD of music videos by Peter Gabriel, released in 2004. The DVD contains remastered audio tracks of songs in DTS 5.1 (DTS 96 kHz/24-bit) and Dolby Digital 5.1 Surround Sound. The new surround sound mixes were created by Daniel Lanois and Richard Chappell. Gabriel said that he was surprised that Lanois contributed to the project, saying that it was the equivalent of "revisiting old ground and someone else's work".

== Track listing ==
1. "Father, Son"
2. "Sledgehammer"
3. "Blood of Eden"
4. "Games Without Frontiers"
5. "I Don't Remember"
6. "Big Time"
7. "Lovetown"
8. "Red Rain"
9. "In Your Eyes"
10. "Don't Give Up"
11. "The Barry Williams Show"
12. "Washing of the Water"
13. "Biko"
14. "Kiss That Frog"
15. "Mercy Street"
16. "Growing Up"
17. "Shaking the Tree"
18. "Shock the Monkey"
19. "Steam"
20. "The Drop"
21. "Zaar"
22. "Solsbury Hill"
23. "Digging in the Dirt"

== Certifications ==
| Region | Certification | Certified units/sales |
|---|---|---|
| Australia (ARIA) | Gold | 7,500^{^} |
^{^} Shipments figures based on certification alone.
