= Scratch My Back =

Studio album of cover songs by Peter Gabriel
- Released: 12 February 2010
- Recorded: 2009
- Studios: AIR Lyndhurst, London, UK; Real World, Box, UK
- Genre: Art pop
- Length: 53:26
- Label: Real World/Virgin
- Producers: Peter Gabriel; Bob Ezrin

Peter Gabriel chronology
Big Blue Ball (2008)	Scratch My Back (2010)	New Blood (2011)

Singles from Scratch My Back
- 1. "The Book of Love" / "Not One of Us" Released: 30 January 2010; 2. "The Boy in the Bubble" / "Biko" Released: 28 February 2010; 3. "Flume" / "Come Talk to Me" Released: 30 March 2010; 4. "The Power of the Heart" / "Solsbury Hill" Released: 28 April 2010; 5. "Mirrorball" / "Mercy Street" Released: 27 May 2010; 6. "Listening Wind" / "I Don't Remember" Released: 26 June 2010

Scratch My Back is the eighth studio album (and fifteenth album overall) by English musician Peter Gabriel, his first in eight years. It was released in February 2010. The album, recorded at AIR Lyndhurst and Real World Studios during 2009, consists of cover versions of twelve songs by various artists, using only orchestral instruments and voice. It is produced by Gabriel with Bob Ezrin.

The album generally received favourable reviews by music journalists and performed well on the album charts around the world, peaking at No. 1 in Belgium, No. 2 in Germany and Canada, and No. 3 in the Czech Republic, Italy and Switzerland. It also reached the top 5 in France and Sweden. In Gabriel's native United Kingdom it peaked at No. 12 on the UK Albums Chart on 21 February 2010, the week following its release. In the United States it peaked at No. 26 on the Billboard 200, No. 2 on the Independent Albums chart and No. 3 on the Rock Albums chart on 12 March 2010.

Scratch My Back was initially released on compact disc and as music download; a vinyl album edition was subsequently released in late March 2010.

== Background ==
The idea behind the Scratch My Back project is a song exchange where each artist would cover one of Gabriel's songs in return for his covering one of theirs; the other artists' renditions of Gabriel's songs were to appear on an album titled I'll Scratch Yours. Initially planned to be released simultaneously with Scratch My Back in 2010, several artists were late in delivering their songs or ultimately declined to participate, necessitating changes to the companion album's concept. With several new artists aboard, the slightly retitled And I'll Scratch Yours was released in September 2013.

According to Gabriel, although he and arranger John Metcalfe had talked about Arvo Pärt and Steve Reich as inspiration, it was the work that Metcalfe did on "Heroes" that "gave us the confidence to be bold in the way in which we were going to approach the record." "Heroes" became the opening track because "without any of the drive of guitar and drums...it builds an enormous tension that bursts open."

If you’re going to reinterpret something, then really do something. Nail your colours to the mast and say, 'This is different, and it isn’t everybody's cup of tea.

— Peter Gabriel, on Scratch My Back.

Stephin Merritt, who wrote "The Book of Love", commented on Gabriel's cover of his song:

At first I thought, "How hilarious, he's got a completely different take on the song." But after a few listens I find it quite sweet. My version of the song focuses on the humour, and his focuses on the pathos. Of course, if I could sing like him I wouldn't have to be a humourist.

== Cover art ==
The cover artwork is a micrograph of two red blood cells folding over each other. It was shot by Steve Gschmeissner and was included in the cover by Marc Bessant. Not coincidentally, the name of Gabriel's supporting tour for the album is "The New Blood Tour". The album's graphic design concept is credited to Marc Bessant and Peter Gabriel.

== Singles ==
Gabriel originally intended to release Scratch My Back and I'll Scratch Yours simultaneously. However, as completion of the latter dragged out, it was instead decided to release a series of double A-sided singles with one song from each album every new full moon during 2010 on iTunes. The first, "The Book of Love" – Gabriel's cover of a Magnetic Fields song, together with "Not One of Us" – Stephin Merritt's (The Magnetic Fields' frontman) cover of a Peter Gabriel song, was released on 30 January 2010. Gabriel's version of "The Boy in the Bubble" coupled with Paul Simon's version of "Biko" was the second, released on 28 February 2010. The third in the series, Gabriel's take on "Flume" paired with Bon Iver's seven-minute long version of "Come Talk to Me" was released on 30 March 2010. Gabriel's cover of "The Boy in the Bubble" debuted at No. 11 on the US Billboard Hot Single Sales chart, his first entry on the chart in over 17 years.

On 17 April 2010 "The Book of Love" / "Not One of Us" as well as "Flume" / "Come Talk to Me" were also released on 7" vinyl to independent record stores.

== Reception ==
Professional ratings
Aggregate scores
Source	Rating
Metacritic	67/100
Review scores
Source	Rating
AllMusic	3.5/5 stars
Entertainment Weekly	B
The Guardian	4/5 stars
The Observer	3/5 stars
Pitchfork	4.5/10
Robert Christgau	(choice cut)
Rolling Stone	2.5/5 stars
Slant Magazine	2.5/5 stars
The Times	2/5 stars
Uncut	4/5 stars

Scratch My Back received generally positive reviews from most music critics. At Metacritic, which assigns a normalised rating out of 100 to reviews from mainstream critics, it received an average score of 67 based on 21 reviews.

Scratch My Back was album of the month in the March 2010 issue of Mojo. Reviewer Mat Snow writes: "He [Gabriel] and his top-of-the-range collaborators (...) have created an album of great insight into the untapped potential of familiar songs, a profound re-imagining made manifest in an orchestral soundworld as rich and thrilling as ever recorded at Air (...)". He gave special mention to the reinterpretations of David Bowie's "Heroes" ("the song’s underlying despair rises to the top"), Paul Simon's "The Boy in the Bubble" ("the song it might have been had not the writer been so determined in 1986 to bring the joys of South African township jive to the Western pop charts") and Talking Heads' "Listening Wind" ("Gabriel shines a soft light into the song's inner desolation"). On the downside Snow describes the version of Lou Reed's "The Power of the Heart" as "a misstep" and Randy Newman's "I Think It's Going to Rain Today" as "superfluous". He concludes the review on a positive note by saying: "An album to make you happy feeling sad, Scratch My Back gets better with each play; it might just turn out to be the best surprise birthday present of the year."

In Metro, Arwa Haider awarded the album 3 stars out of 5 and commented: "Its most impressive quality is sensitivity; these are elegant orchestral arrangements … It’s sporadically successful; Gabriel saps the life from Paul Simon’s The Boy in the Bubble and somehow over-eggs Arcade Fire's My Body Is a Cage" and concluded "this is exceptionally classy karaoke."

In The New York Times, Jon Pareles wrote: "Covers albums don’t get any more idiosyncratic or high concept than Scratch My Back."

Pitchfork reviewer Mark Richardson was less enthusiastic: "Every song on Scratch My Back, regardless of its original tone or meaning, is flattened out and turned into this one melodramatic and depressing thing (...)"; although the album "sounds earnest [and] professional", it consists of "ponderous, dull, and ultimately pointless versions of songs that sound much better elsewhere."

== Track listing ==
Scratch My Back track listing
No.	Title	Writer(s)	Original artist	Length
1.	"Heroes"	David Bowie, Brian Eno	David Bowie	4:10
2.	"The Boy in the Bubble"	Paul Simon, Forere Motloheloa	Paul Simon	4:28
3.	"Mirrorball"	Guy Garvey, Craig Potter, Mark Potter, Pete Turner, Richard Jupp	Elbow	4:48
4.	"Flume"	Justin Vernon	Bon Iver	3:01
5.	"Listening Wind"	David Byrne, Brian Eno, Chris Frantz, Jerry Harrison, Tina Weymouth	Talking Heads	4:23
6.	"The Power of the Heart"	Lou Reed	Lou Reed	5:52
7.	"My Body Is a Cage"	Win Butler, Régine Chassagne, Richard Reed Parry, Tim Kingsbury, Will Butler, Jeremy Gara, Sarah Neufeld	Arcade Fire	6:13
8.	"The Book of Love"	Stephin Merritt	The Magnetic Fields	3:53
9.	"I Think It's Going to Rain Today"	Randy Newman	Randy Newman	2:34
10.	"Après Moi"	Regina Spektor	Regina Spektor	5:13
11.	"Philadelphia"	Neil Young	Neil Young	3:46
12.	"Street Spirit (Fade Out)"	Thom Yorke, Ed O'Brien, Colin Greenwood, Jonny Greenwood, Phil Selway	Radiohead	5:06

Special edition bonus disc
No.	Title	Writer(s)	Original artist	Length
1.	"The Book of Love" (Remix)	Merritt	The Magnetic Fields	3:40
2.	"My Body Is a Cage" (Oxford London Temple version)	Butler, Chassagne, Parry, Kingsbury, Butler, Gara, Neufeld	Arcade Fire	6:03
3.	"Waterloo Sunset" (Oxford London Temple version)	Ray Davies	The Kinks	3:49
4.	""Heroes"" (Wildebeest mix)	Bowie, Eno	David Bowie	4:06

== Personnel ==
- Peter Gabriel – production, arrangement ("The Book of Love"), design concept
- Bob Ezrin – production
- John Metcalfe – arrangement (except "The Book of Love" and "I Think It's Going to Rain Today"), mixing (except "I Think It's Going to Rain Today"), orchestration (except "The Book of Love"), additional "Oxford" recording
- Nick Ingman – arrangement ("The Book of Love"), orchestration ("The Book of Love")
- Will Gregory – arrangement ("The Book of Love")
- Randy Newman – arrangement ("I Think It's Going to Rain Today")
- Richard Chappell – mixing, engineering (except "The Book of Love"), Air Studios sessions recording
- Tchad Blake – mixing ("My Body is a Cage", "Après moi")
- Pete Sené – assistant engineering (except "The Book of Love")
- Mark Claydon – assistant mixing (except "The Book of Love")
- Kurina Támas – recording ("The Book of Love")
- Kölcsényi Attila – recording ("The Book of Love")
- Steve Orchard – Air Studios sessions recording
- Olga Fitzroy – Air Studios sessions recording assistant, Pro Tools editor
- Laurence Greed – Pro Tools editor assistant
- Melanie Gabriel – vocals ("The Book of Love")
- London Scratch Orchestra – orchestra performance
- The Choir of Christ Church Cathedral, Oxford – choir ("My Body is a Cage")
- Hungarian Orchestra – orchestra performance ("The Book of Love")
- Tony Cousins – mastering
- Marc Bessant – graphic design, design concept
- Nadav Kander – photography
- David Hiscock – photography

== Charts ==
=== Weekly charts ===
Weekly chart performance for Scratch My Back
Chart (2010)	Peak position
Australian Albums (ARIA)	59
Austrian Albums (Ö3 Austria)	11
Belgian Albums (Ultratop Flanders)	13
Belgian Albums (Ultratop Wallonia)	1
Canadian Albums (Billboard)	2
Czech Albums (ČNS IFPI)	3
Danish Albums (Hitlisten)	15
Dutch Albums (Album Top 100)	10
Finnish Albums (Suomen virallinen lista)	41
French Albums (SNEP)	4
German Albums (Offizielle Top 100)	2
Hungarian Albums (MAHASZ)	28
Irish Albums (IRMA)	22
Italian Albums (FIMI)	3
Mexican Albums (AMPROFON)	68
New Zealand Albums (RMNZ)	15
Norwegian Albums (VG-lista)	11
Polish Albums (ZPAV)	2
Portuguese Albums (AFP)	13
Scottish Albums (Official Charts)	16
Spanish Albums (Promusicae)	11
Swedish Albums (Sverigetopplistan)	5
Swiss Albums (Schweizer Hitparade)	3
UK Albums (Official Charts)	12
US Billboard 200	26
US Independent Albums (Billboard)	2
US Top Rock Albums (Billboard)	3

=== Year-end charts ===
Year-end chart performance for Scratch My Back
Chart (2010)	Position
Belgian Albums (Ultratop Wallonia)	33
French Albums (SNEP)	121

== Certifications ==
Certifications for Scratch My Back
Region	Certification	Certified units/sales
Italy (FIMI)	Gold	30,000^{*}
Poland (ZPAV)	Gold	10,000^{*}
^{*} Sales figures based on certification alone.

== Release history ==
Release history and formats for Scratch My Back
Region	Date	Record label
Australia	12 February 2010	Real World Records/Virgin Records
Germany	12 February 2010	Real World Records/Virgin Records
United Kingdom	15 February 2010	Real World Records/Virgin Records
Mainland Europe	15 February 2010	Real World Records/Virgin Records
Canada	16 February 2010	Universal Music
United States	2 March 2010	Real World Records
Brazil	15 March 2010	EMI
