= Games Without Frontiers (song) =

Single by Peter Gabriel

from the album Peter Gabriel (Melt)
- B-side: "Start/I Don't Remember" (UK), "Lead a Normal Life" (US)
- Released: 25 January 1980
- Recorded: 1979
- Genre: Art rock; synthpop; experimental pop; progressive rock; new wave
- Length: 4:05 (album version); 3:47 (single edit version)
- Label: Charisma
- Songwriter: Peter Gabriel
- Producer: Steve Lillywhite

Peter Gabriel singles chronology
"D.I.Y." (1978)	"Games Without Frontiers" (1980)	"No Self Control" (1980)

Music video
- "Games Without Frontiers" on YouTube

"Games Without Frontiers" is a song written and recorded by the English rock musician Peter Gabriel. It was released on his 1980 self-titled third studio album, and features a vocal contribution by Kate Bush. The song's lyrics are interpreted as a commentary on war and international diplomacy being like children's games. The music video includes film clips of Olympic Games events and scenes from the educational film Duck and Cover (1951), which used a cartoon turtle to instruct US schoolchildren on what to do in case of nuclear attack. This forlorn imagery tends to reinforce the song's anti-war theme. Two music video versions were initially created for the song, followed by a third one made in 2004.

The single became Gabriel's first top-10 hit in the United Kingdom, peaking at No. 4, and — tied with 1986's "Sledgehammer" — his highest-charting song in the United Kingdom. It peaked at No. 7 in Canada, but only at No. 48 in the United States. The B-side of the single consisted of two tracks combined into one: "Start" and "I Don't Remember". A remix of "Games Without Frontiers" by Massive Attack and Dave Bottrill was included on Gabriel's 1993 single "Steam"; this version later appeared on the Flotsam and Jetsam album in 2019.

== Background ==
Gabriel said that "Games Without Frontiers" "seemed to have several layers to it." The song's title refers to Jeux sans frontières, a long-running TV show broadcast in several European countries. Teams representing a town or city in one of the participating countries would compete in games of skill, often while dressed in bizarre costumes. While some games were simple races, others allowed one team to obstruct another. The British version was titled It's a Knockout—words that Gabriel mentions in the lyrics.

Larry Fast, who played synthesisers on the song, explained that many of the competing countries, which had also fought in World War 2, viewed these competitions as a source of national pride. Gabriel identified that the television show possessed themes of "nationalism, territorialism, competitiveness that underlies all that assembly of jolly people." He found the title "Games Without Frontiers" in a TV guide.

That's a device I use quite often, taking titles or phrases from ordinary situations and trying to put them up against a slightly different background that will give them a new slant. It's an area I'm more interested in than a totally fabricated artificial world.

Gabriel and Fast had read a book by Michael Herr titled Dispatches, which recounted Herr's experiences and observations from the Vietnam War, including one story of an American urinating on a dead Vietnamese soldier. This scene, which Fast believed was a reflection of the actions that American soldiers found permissible and excusable, inspired the line "pissing on goons in the jungle". Gabriel said that the names in the song were "meaningless, but they do have certain associations with them". The lyrics "Adolf builds a bonfire/Enrico plays with it" echo lines from Evelyn Waugh's V-J Day diary ("Randolph built a bonfire and Auberon fell into it").

== Recording ==
Musically, "Games Without Frontiers" opens with a mixture of acoustic and electronic percussion accompanied by a countoff. The electronic percussion was triggered by a PAiA Programmable Drum Set; "Games Without Frontiers" was the first time Gabriel used a drum machine on one of his solo albums. During the intro, a synth bass and an angular slide guitar part enter with Kate Bush's vocals, creating a "dark sonic environment" as described by AllMusic reviewer Steve Huey.

The pre-choruses feature whistling and a Moog synthesiser; Fast commented that this section was inspired by hocketing techniques found on Switched-On Bach, a Wendy Carlos album consisting of classical music played on a Moog synthesizer. He explained that the hocketing technique involved the granulation of a complex melodic line into smaller components, which would then be separately re-recorded for a richer textural soundscape. Fast had met Carlos at the Audio Engineering Society Convention, where Fast considered the application of this recording technique on one of Gabriel's compositions. Fast established a number of turnaround points in the synthesisers and recorded multiple overdubs on the Moog; he believed that this recording process was more akin to his approach to making electronic music rather than rock records. Fast thought that his "small interwoven Moog parts [built] up a synth sound that covered a lot of sonic territory".

Following the final chorus, the song segues into a percussion breakdown punctuated by synth and guitar effects. Jerry Marotta remembered that the musicians used nine minutes of recording tape to record various sound effects, including broken glass and thrown drums. The tape was then sped up and inserted at the end of the song, resulting in what Marotta described as a "quick, percussive and punchy" sound. The song was pared down from a longer jam that lasted around 20 minutes according to Fast.

=== Overdubbing of Kate Bush's vocals ===
Originally, a different female vocalist attempted the "jeux sans frontières" lyric, but her parts were not used. Gabriel subsequently invited Kate Bush to record the part at his studio instead. Bush arrived at the recording studio with one of her brothers, who served as her "family bodyguard". Producer Steve Lillywhite remembered that Gabriel and Bush had a mutual level of respect and admiration for each other. "I think everybody fancied her really, particularly Peter. I ended up doing some stuff with her on The Dreaming. Anyone involved in the sound of Peter's album she wanted as well. She was as much star-struck by him as he was with her." Fast also said that the recording engineers had a "huge race getting out to the control room to see who would get there first to adjust her microphones or fix her headphones."

During the recording session with Bush, Lillywhite provided guidance on how to sing the "jeux sans frontières" lyric. After a few passes, Robert Fripp, who was in the control room, insisted that she had already provided a satisfactory take. Fripp felt that Bush "nailed" her take within a short period of time and asked Lillywhite why he wanted her to attempt the part again. Lillywhite found Fripp's comment to be a "real play by him because he's been the producer. I just completely ignored him, pressed the button and said, 'Can you try that again please?' As a producer, it was a pivotal moment in me keeping to my guns and getting what I wanted." Fripp had encountered a passage in Lillywhite's biography that mentioned this event as a "turning point" in his career as a producer. In a 2022 interview, Fripp reaffirmed his stance that it was "paramount to protect the artist" from recording beyond the completion of a "magical" take. Bush finalised her part in about 30 minutes and Lillywhite described the recording session as "great fun".

== Release ==
Gabriel's first two solo studio albums were distributed in the US by Atlantic Records, but they rejected his third studio album (which contained this track), telling Gabriel he was committing "commercial suicide". Atlantic dropped him but tried to buy the album back when "Games Without Frontiers" took off in the UK and started getting airplay in the US. At that point Gabriel wanted nothing to do with Atlantic, and let Mercury Records distribute the album in America.

Gabriel opted not to publicly reveal that the backing vocals on "Games Without Frontiers" were from Kate Bush until the single was successful. When Bush was previewing her solo album Never for Ever, some executives from EMI had commented on "Games Without Frontiers" and had failed to identify Bush as source of the counterpoint vocals. Jon Kelly, who co-produced the album with Bush, said that the two struggled to maintain their composure after one of the executives said that they couldn't "understand what the hell she's singing."

"Games Without Frontiers" was issued as a single on 25 January 1980 with "Start" and "I Don't Remember" as its B-sides. Gabriel's erstwhile manager Gail Colson had advocated for "Games Without Frontiers" to be released as the album's first single and prevailed against the opinion of Steve Lillywhite, who opposed the decision. The single reached No. 4 in the United Kingdom, where it spent a total of 11 weeks in the top 75 and became his first top ten in that country. It also reached No. 3 in Ireland, No. 7 in Canada, and No. 48 in the United States. The song performed particularly well in Chicago, where it spent two weeks at No. 5 on the survey of superstation WLS-FM-AM and ranked at No. 87 for the year.

== Artwork ==
The photo in the single artwork was taken by Hipgnosis and designed by Storm Thorgerson, who utilised a technique developed by Les Krims where images from a Polaroid SX-70 camera are squashed to create various visual effects. Gabriel recalled that they treated the images with burnt matches and coins to achieve the illusion of a melted face. Thorgerson discussed how this process was conducted:

If one pushes around the developing picture sandwiched between two bits of plastic with a blunt instrument like the end of a pencil, the image is then smeared as it develops. Since this procedure is dead easy we did it loads of times along with Peter Gabriel in disfiguring himself by manipulating Polaroids as they developed. Peter impressed us greatly with his ability to appear in an unflattering way, preferring the theatrical or artistic to the cosmetic.

== Radio version, music videos ==
The album version includes the line "Whistling tunes we piss on the goons in the jungle" after the second verse and before the second chorus. This was replaced for the single with a more radio-friendly repeat of the line "Whistling tunes we're kissing baboons in the jungle" from the first chorus. This version was also included in the initial copies of the Shaking the Tree (1990) compilation.

The original music video was directed by David Mallet in black-and-white and features shots of children sitting around a dining table. Footage from Olympic sporting events were featured along with a series of facial expressions from Gabriel, which were projected on television screens that change in time with the music. Gabriel observed that the original music video attracted some controversy:

The idea of the song was countries behaving like playground kids. It's against nationalism, but they had seen me moving around the tables and thought that I was leering at them like a dirty old man. At the end, there was a whole series of children's toys, and they thought that the jack-in-the-box was an obvious reference to masturbation. So it says a lot more about the minds of the people who ran Top of the Pops than it did about my video.

In 2004, the music video was updated to include excerpts from the films Active Site, Spiral and Grid by Israeli artist Michal Rovner. Additional footage was supplied by York Tillyer, Dan Blore, and Marc Bessant. Visuals from Duck and Cover, a 1951 educational film teaching children how to survive a nuclear attack, are also featured at the end of the music video. This version was featured on the release of Gabriel's Play, a DVD compilation consisting of 23 music videos. When asked in a 2007 interview if there were any music videos of his that he disliked, Gabriel cited "Games Without Frontiers", saying "My performance makes me cringe. I just look awkward and embarrassed, and I'm hamming it up."

== Critical reception ==
Record World thought that the song's "creative percussion/keyboard / vocal mix and unique tempo shifts" made the song "as attractive as it is interesting." Cashbox called the song a "mesmerizingly elliptical pop hymn" with its "eastern electro/acoustic percussives that swirl about Gabriel's spoken/sung vocals". Jim DeRogatis of the Chicago Sun-Times characterised the song as a "catchy single with edgy lyrics." Writing for Record Mirror, Chris Westwood described the song as a "lilting paean to war games" that was "a bubbly, if unremarkable, single which at least hints at the kind of authority he's presently capable of."

Mark Beaumont of Louder Sound identified "Games Without Frontiers" as an "ultra-catchy" song pertaining to global tensions. AllMusic praised the song as "one of the finest moments preceding Gabriel's commercial breakthrough in the mid-'80s". Paste ranked the song number six on its list of the top 20 greatest Peter Gabriel songs, giving particular attention to Gabriel's and Bush's vocals, saying that the former "pronounces every lyric like a teacher taking attendance" and the latter sounds "phantasmagorical" as she "deliver[s] her haunted message until it finally sinks in".

== Live performances ==
During his 1986–1987 tour, Gabriel directed the song's critique of militarism at the Contra War in Nicaragua. Gabriel's 1991 performance of the song from the Netherlands was beamed via satellite to Wembley Arena in England as part of "The Simple Truth" concert for Kurdish refugees. He also performed the song during his 1993–1994 Secret World Tour. On Gabriel's Still Growing Up Tour in 2003, Gabriel sang the song while riding on a segway.

== Musicians ==
- Peter Gabriel – vocals; synthesizer; synth bass; whistles
- David Rhodes – guitar
- Jerry Marotta – drums; percussion
- Larry Fast – synthesizer; synth bass
- Kate Bush – backing vocals
- Steve Lillywhite – whistles
- Hugh Padgham – whistles

== Chart performance ==
=== Weekly charts ===
Chart (1980)	Peak position
Australia (Kent Music Report)	44
Canada RPM	7
Ireland (IRMA)	3
Luxembourg (Radio Luxembourg)	2
UK Singles (OCC)	4
US Billboard Hot 100	48
US Cashbox Top 100	60

=== Year-end charts ===
Chart (1980)	Rank
Canada	57
UK	60

== See also ==
- List of anti-war songs
