= The Rhythm of the Heat =

Song by Peter Gabriel

from the album Peter Gabriel
- Released: 1982
- Length: 5:15
- Label: Charisma; Geffen
- Songwriter: Peter Gabriel
- Producers: David Lord and Peter Gabriel

"The Rhythm of the Heat" is a song written and performed by the English rock musician Peter Gabriel. Released in 1982, it is the opening track off his fourth self-titled album.

In 1985, "The Rhythm of the Heat" was used during the opening scene of "Evan," the twenty-second episode of season one of Miami Vice. (The climactic scene of the episode made prominent use of another Peter Gabriel song, "Biko.") It also appeared in the Oliver Stone film Natural Born Killers in 1994.

A live recording of "Rhythm of the Heat" was included on certain editions of Gabriel's 1983 Plays Live album. An instrumental reworking of the song, titled "The Heat", was later included on Gabriel's 1985 Birdy soundtrack album and was used prominently in the trailer for the 1993 film Tombstone. Gabriel also did an orchestral re-recording of "The Rhythm of the Heat" on his New Blood album in 2011.

== Composition ==
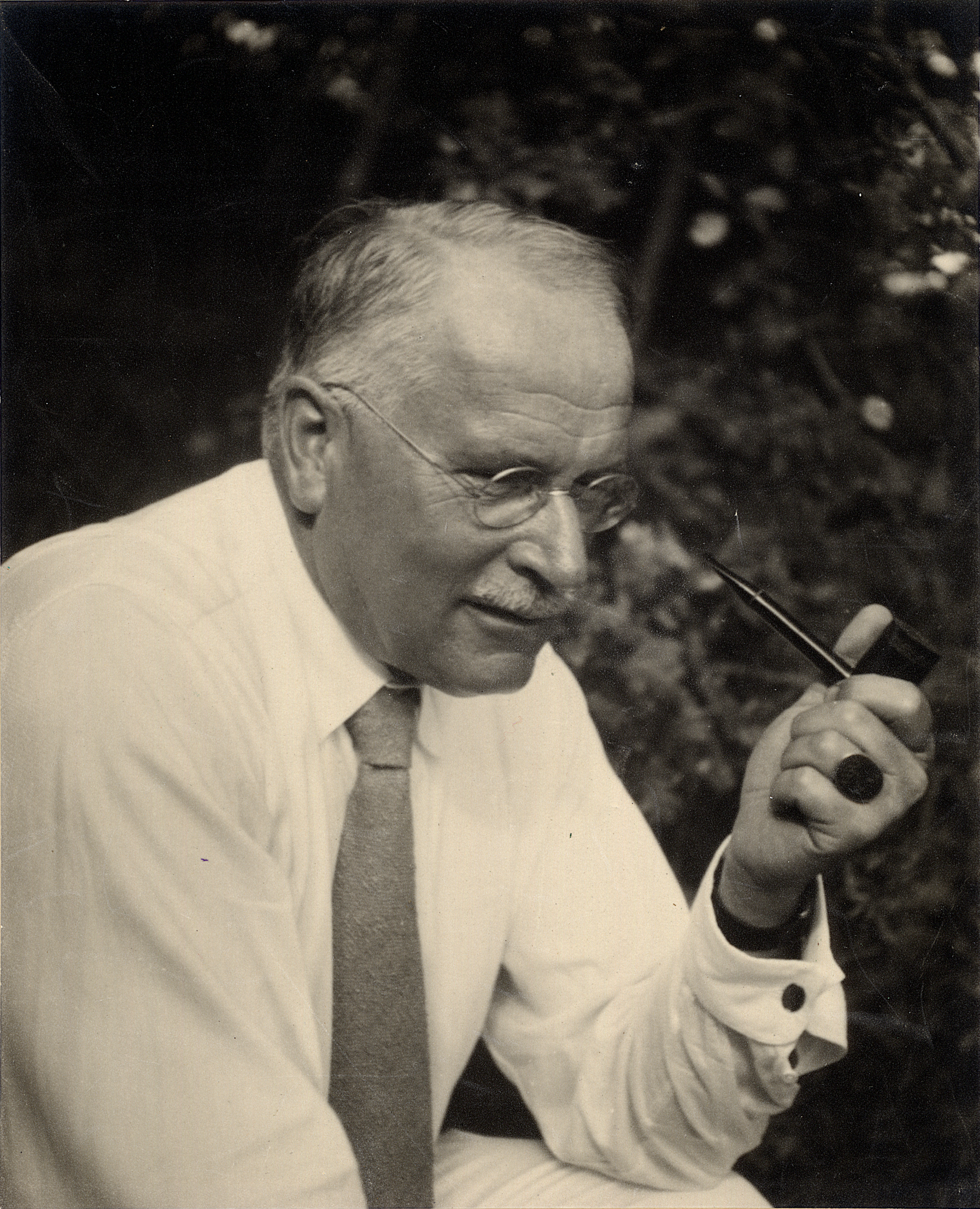
Carl Jung in 1935

The working title for "The Rhythm of the Heat" was "Jung in Africa", referring to Swiss psychologist Carl Jung's experiences visiting Africa. Gabriel was a reader of Jung's work and learned that the psychologist had observed a group of African drummers and dancers in Kenya. During Jung's time with them, he became overwhelmed by their performance and worried that the music and dancing would subsume him. Gabriel sought to evoke these emotions in "The Rhythm of the Heat".

I love the idea of this guy who shaped a lot of the way we think in the West, who lives in his head and in his dreams suddenly getting sucked into this thing that he can't avoid where he has to let go of control completely and feels that he has become possessed in a way, not by a devil but by this thing which is bigger than him and I think there is a bit of that sense of the European exploring African music.

Gabriel mentioned in a 1989 interview with Keyboard magazine that the instrumental basis of "Rhythm of the Heat" was spurred by his interest in learning how to loop snippets of sound.

== Recording ==
"The Rhythm of the Heat" was one of the first songs Gabriel developed for his fourth studio album. In its earliest stage, the song consisted of raw vocals and a basic backing track. Similar to other songs on the album, Gabriel built "The Rhythm of the Heat" around a series of rhythms rather than a chord progression, making use of drum machines and a rhythm box to accomplish this. Most of the music for "The Rhythm of the Heat" was finished early on, whereas other musical ideas on the album were developed in the studio with producer David Lord.

Gabriel built the song around a looped sample from the Fairlight CMI called "Petswan", which came from a sound played on a swanee whistle. This sample, which was pitch-shifted and delayed to resemble blown bottles, was then used to establish the pulse of the song. Another sample from the Fairlight, the "Pizztwang", was created by tuning down dulcimers and other stringed instruments that were plucked and hammered. The Pizztwang sound enters following a brief wordless vocal passage from Gabriel. Saxophone samples, drones, and sounds from a Moog synthesizer were also added to the song. In addition to a standard drum kit, Jerry Marotta also played a heartbeat pattern on a surdo, which is faded-in during the second verse. Gabriel had asked Marotta to generate some musical ideas, and the two decided that a surdo would be superior to a conventional bass drum.

Gabriel sought to evoke a Ghanaian war dance during the ending of "The Rhythm of the Heat" and supplemented the section with loud bass accents. The Ghanaian drums during the song's ending were played by the Ekome Dance Company, an Afro-Caribbean performance group based in Bristol. Lord had previously worked with the ensemble at Crescent Studios and requested that they play on the recording. The Ekome Dance Company recorded their parts live during a lengthy recording session. Fast recalled that they encountered some difficulties in providing every member of the ensemble with headphones. Their parts were multiplied to create the impression of a larger percussion ensemble.

== Live performances ==
Prior to the song's official release, "The Rhythm of the Heat" was previewed at the first World of Music, Arts and Dance (WOMAD) festival in 1982, which was co-founded by Gabriel two years prior. Members of the Ekome Dance Company also joined Gabriel onstage for this performance. The song served as the set opener for Gabriel's Security Tour, where members of his band walked through the audience playing marching drums before reaching the stage. During this performance, Gabriel sang on a raised platform where his movements were "outlined by dramatic backlighting" according to concert reviewer Bill Provick. Gabriel also performed the song in 2007 during his Warm Up Tour in Europe, which included a stop in Wiltshire for the 25th anniversary of WOMAD.

In 2010, when Gabriel was touring his Scratch My Back cover album, "The Rhythm of the Heat" was added to the setlist for the purpose of supplementing the setlist with original material. For these performances, Gabriel decided to forgo drums in favor orchestral instrumentation conducted and arranged by John Metcalfe. He asked Metcalfe to repurpose the African rhythms found on the studio recording so that they could be played on orchestral instruments. This arrangement later appeared on Gabriel's New Blood album. Gabriel identified the ending section of "The Rhythm of the Heat" as his favourite moment on the album. "We retained some of the energy, drive and interwoven patterns of the rhythm, but transformed them into these other sounds." Gabriel continued to play the song in orchestral form through 2012, including as part of a seven-song set at the Hop Farm Festival. "Rhythm of the Heat" served as the set opener for Gabriel's 2016 joint-tour with Sting on the Rock Paper Scissors Tour.

== Critical reception ==
Louder characterised "The Rhythm of the Heat" as one of Gabriel's most ambitious compositions. Adam Sweeting of Melody Maker said that the song's ending "builds up intensity and massive atmosphere", further adding that it would serve as a fitting soundtrack for a Peter Weir film. Peter Gabriel biographer Spencer Bright thought that the song was "Gabriel's most powerful expression of rhythmic power and explores his perennial obsession with spiritual transformation, in this case Jung's experiences in Africa". Paste ranked the song number 12 on its list of the top 20 greatest Peter Gabriel songs.

== Personnel ==
Credits from the album's liner notes.

- Peter Gabriel – vocals, Linn programming, Fairlight CMI, Prophet-5, surdo
- Tony Levin – bass guitar
- Larry Fast – Moog synthesizer, Prophet-5
- Jerry Marotta – drum kit, surdo
- Ekome Dance Company – Ghanaian drums
- David Rhodes – backing vocals
- John Ellis – backing vocals
