= Peter Gabriel (1982 album) =

Fourth solo album by Peter Gabriel

Studio album by Peter Gabriel
- Released: 10 September 1982
- Recorded: Spring 1981 – Summer 1982
- Studios: Ashcombe House (Swainswick, Somerset, England)
- Genres: Art rock; art pop; worldbeat; post-punk; progressive rock
- Length: 45:27
- Labels: Charisma (UK); Geffen (US, Canada)
- Producers: David Lord; Peter Gabriel

Peter Gabriel chronology
Peter Gabriel (1980)	Peter Gabriel (1982)	Plays Live (1983)

Peter Gabriel studio album chronology
Peter Gabriel (1980)	Peter Gabriel (1982)	So (1986)

Singles from Peter Gabriel
- 1. "Shock the Monkey" Released: September 1982; 2. "I Have the Touch" Released: December 1982; 3. "Wallflower" Released: 1982 (NL)

Peter Gabriel is the fourth studio album by the English rock musician Peter Gabriel. In the United States and Canada, the album was released by Geffen Records with the title Security. Some music streaming services refer to it as Peter Gabriel 4: Security. A German-language version, entitled Deutsches Album (German Album), was also released. The album saw Gabriel expanding on the post-punk and world music influences from his 1980 eponymous studio album, and earned him his first US top 40 single with "Shock the Monkey".

Instead of working with Hipgnosis on the cover art as he did for his previous three studio albums, Gabriel turned to sculptor Malcolm Poynter. The image is of Gabriel's face, based on an experimental videotape recorded by Poynter and heavily distorted through the use of flexible mirrors, Fresnel lenses, and lighting techniques.

The album was remastered with most of Gabriel's catalogue in 2002.

== Recording ==
The album was recorded at Ashcombe House in Swainswick, Somerset, half a mile from where Gabriel was living at the time. Work on the album began in the spring of 1981, with Gabriel handling the writing and pre-production. He also used a Fairlight CMI to sample sounds from various sources, including a scrapyard. Like the previous studio album, he took a rhythm-first approach to songwriting by improvising on piano and keyboards to a drum machine, this time a Linn LM-1. Co-producer David Lord would later join to help structure and arrange Gabriel's ideas into proper songs, and together they created 8-track demos with the Linn as a reference for his backing band.

That summer, he recorded the basic tracks for the album with his band, including Jerry Marotta, Tony Levin, David Rhodes, and John Ellis. These sessions yielded seven hours' worth of material to be overdubbed and edited down over subsequent months. The first two weeks of sessions involved use of the Mobile One, a London-based recording truck which offered 46-track recording facilities before a control room was ready.

After the basic tracks were recorded, Larry Fast joined for three months, working with Gabriel on 'electronic production' aspects including synthesizer overdubs, programming and audio treatments. By spring of 1982, Gabriel was focusing on writing lyrics and recording finished vocals, which he did in the control room at Ashcombe via a Shure SM57 dynamic microphone. As per Lord, they did up to 20 takes for each song, rated each word on a scale of one to ten, and compiled the best parts together – this whole process took hours to accomplish. The album was mixed down at Lord's Crescent Studios onto a Sony PCM-1610 digital 2-track, being an early use of digital recording.

== Songs ==
The songs of this album cover a wide variety of subject matter. "The Rhythm of the Heat" is based on Swiss psychiatrist, psychotherapist, and psychologist Carl Jung's experience watching a group of drummers and dancers in Kenya, during which he became overwhelmed and worried that the music and dancing would subsume him. "San Jacinto" reflects on the fear and pain experienced by an Indigenous American man who sees his culture overwhelmed by modern white society, based on a story told to Gabriel by an Apache man. "Shock the Monkey", a meditation on jealousy, uses imagery of a primate to describe personal anxieties. "Lay Your Hands on Me" deals with a theme of healing, through trust, which is further explored on later studio albums. "The Family and the Fishing Net" compares a modern-day wedding to a voodoo sacrifice. "Wallflower" is about the treatment of political prisoners during the 1980s.

Larry Fast, who played synthesizers on the album, mentioned during a presentation on Moog synthesizers that the working title for "The Rhythm of the Heat" was "Jung in Africa", the working title for "Shock the Monkey" was "Black Bush", and the working title for "Lay Your Hands on Me" was "93" – this was the number of the Linn LM-1 pattern used on the track. Additionally, in The South Bank Show documentary on the album, the working title for "I Have the Touch" was shown to be "Hands".

Gabriel discussed several of the songs in an interview with DJ Alan Freeman:

- "The Family and the Fishing Net": "It's basically a wedding song, but it's more an approach from the undercurrents of the wedding ritual. There are quite a lot of situations that we accept as perfectly normal and regular, traditional, that have this element of ritual that makes deep impressions on the psyche. And this is a somewhat impressionistic account of a wedding. I'd also been reading quite a lot of Dylan Thomas at the time, so there is that influence in the lyric writing."
- "Lay Your Hands on Me": "It is part [hymn] and part the sort of faith healing aspect, which I think occurs in that and in 'Kiss of Life' too… I'm convinced that we have abilities within ourselves that are not really acknowledged yet. There's also the fairly dry, urban images in the verses, and then there's the sense of cleansing through this laying-on of hands. There's the screaming for the hands to be laid on in the choruses."
- "Wallflower": "'Wallflower' began almost as a love song. In fact, that's probably the oldest of the songs. I started doing a version of it on the third album, which was never finished. And then I rerecorded it for this one. The Amnesty programme that they were running on the television made quite a big dent on me as a prisoner of conscience situation. And I thought that the emotion that's in the song could be usefully directed with that sort of lyric. So, after a certain amount of soul-searching, I decided to go for it on this album. And it feels real to me, so I'm quite pleased with it."

Gabriel reworked several songs from the album ("The Rhythm of the Heat," "San Jacinto," and "Wallflower") as instrumental cues for the score of the 1984 film Birdy and its accompanying soundtrack album.

== Title ==
As with his previous three studio albums, the album is titled Peter Gabriel. In the United States and Canada, Geffen Records issued the album under the title Security to differentiate it from his previous releases. The title was changed with Gabriel's reluctant agreement. The new title was displayed in a sticker on top of the LP sleeve's shrink wrap and on the disc labels. The album was officially known as Peter Gabriel in other territories.

== Critical reception ==
Professional ratings
Review scores
Source	Rating
AllMusic	4/5 stars
Chicago Sun-Times	3.5/4 stars
The Encyclopedia of Popular Music	5/5 stars
Entertainment Weekly	A−
Q	4/5 stars
The Rolling Stone Album Guide	4/5 stars
Uncut	8/10
The Village Voice	C+

In The Boston Phoenix, Howard Hampton wrote that "though I have serious reservations about the album, it is just varied, provocative, and experimental enough to have radio programmers and fans murmuring 'artistic breakthrough.' It even has commercial potential (up to a point – Asia it isn't)." Cashbox wrote that the album possessed "challenging aural soundscapes capable of propelling listeners to different levels of consciousness" and that it was a "superlative late-night, headphone experience for lovers of spacy yet introspective melodies." Billboard thought that the album "again confirms [Gabriel's] stature as a virtual rock visionary", adding that its tracks were "as uncompromised as ever" with their "experiments in electronics and Third World rhythms".

In a retrospective review, Stephen Thomas Erlewine of AllMusic thought that the album "continued where the third Gabriel album left off, sharing some of the same dense production and sense of cohesion, yet lightening the atmosphere and expanding the sonic palette." Erlewine partially attributed the album's "brighter feel" to Gabriel's embrace of African and Latin rhythms, which he thought were effective in complementing the synthesizers. He asserted that certain songs required greater attention from the listener, including "The Family and the Fishing Net," "Lay Your Hands on Me," and "Wallflower", but felt that some of them failed to deliver a rewarding experience.

== Track listing ==
All tracks are written by Peter Gabriel.

Side one
No.	Title	Length
1.	"The Rhythm of the Heat"	5:15
2.	"San Jacinto"	6:21
3.	"I Have the Touch"	4:30
4.	"The Family and the Fishing Net"	7:08

Side two
No.	Title	Length
5.	"Shock the Monkey"	5:28
6.	"Lay Your Hands on Me"	6:03
7.	"Wallflower"	6:30
8.	"Kiss of Life"	4:17
Total length:		45:27

== Deutsches Album ==
Deutsches Album

Studio album by Peter Gabriel
- Released: November 1982
- Recorded: 1981–1982
- Length: 45:27
- Label: Charisma
- Producers: David Lord; Peter Gabriel

Peter Gabriel chronology
Peter Gabriel (1980)	Deutsches Album (1982)	Plays Live (1983)

Professional ratings
Review scores
Source	Rating
AllMusic	4/5 stars

Deutsches Album (1982) is Gabriel's German-language adaptation of his fourth studio album. It was released simultaneously with the English-language edition in Germany.

Like Gabriel's previous German-language album, Ein deutsches album (1980), Deutsches Album differs from its English-language release in several ways. The album has a different running order: "San Jacinto" is swapped with "The Family and the Fishing Net" (here, "Das Fischernetz"). Some of the songs are substantially remixed and are, for instance, 15–30 seconds longer or shorter than their international versions. Track eight gains a final coda not found on the English version, while track seven has an earlier instrumental fade. The background vocals are redone in German. In the third track, a shouted nonsense refrain has been added. All songs were written by Peter Gabriel with "Texte" (lyrics) by Peter Gabriel and Horst Königstein.

=== Track listing ===
All tracks are written by Peter Gabriel.

Side one
No.	Title	Length
1.	"Der Rhythmus der Hitze"	5:36
2.	"Das Fischernetz"	6:45
3.	"Kon Takt!"	4:31
4.	"San Jacinto"	6:13

Side two
No.	Title	Length
5.	"Schock den Affen"	5:43
6.	"Handauflegen"	6:02
7.	"Nicht die Erde hat dich verschluckt"	5:59
8.	"Mundzumundbeatmung"	4:54
Total length:		45:27

== Personnel ==
=== Musicians ===
- Peter Gabriel – lead vocals, Fairlight CMI (1–8), Prophet-5 (1, 3, 5–7), Linn LM-1 programming (1–6), piano (7), surdo (1, 8), additional drums (2)
- Larry Fast – Moog synthesizer (1–4, 8), Prophet-5 (1, 3, 5, 7), electronic percussion (8), Fairlight CMI
- Stephen Paine – Fairlight CMI (4)
- David Lord – Polymoog and Prophet synthesizers (6), Fairlight CMI (6, 7), piano (7, 8)
- David Rhodes – guitar (2–8), backing vocals (1, 3, 4, 6, 8)
- John Ellis – guitar (2, 4), backing vocals (1, 3, 8)
- Tony Levin – bass (1, 7–8), Chapman Stick (2–5), fretless bass (6)
- Jerry Marotta – drums, surdo (1), percussion (6)
- Roberto Laneri – treated saxophone (4)
- Morris Pert – traditional Ethiopian pipes (4), timbales (6), percussion (8)
- Jill Gabriel – backing vocals (2)
- Peter Hammill – backing vocals (4, 5, 6)
- Ekome Dance Company – Ghanaian drums (1)

=== Technical ===
- Produced by David Lord and Peter Gabriel
- Engineered by David Lord
- Assistant engineer – Neil Perry
- Additional engineers (Mobile One) – Andy Rose and Tim Wybrow
- Mastered by Bob Ludwig (US releases) and Ian Cooper (UK releases)
- Remix – Julian Mendelsohn (5)
- Remix assistant – Danny Heaps (5)
- Digital editing – Mike King (Advision Studios)
- Equipment – Albert Lawrence, Mal Craggs, Alan Terry, and Ian Tucker
- Artwork – Malcolm Poynter
- Typeseting – Ron Hart
- Management – Gail Colson and Norma Bishop (Gailforce)

== Charts ==
Chart (1982)	Peak position
Australian Albums (Kent Music Report)	66
Canada Top Albums/CDs (RPM)	2
Dutch Albums (Album Top 100)	14
Finnish Albums (The Official Finnish Charts)	13
French Albums (SNEP)	5
New Zealand Albums (RMNZ)	18
Norwegian Albums (VG-lista)	15
UK Albums (Official Charts)	6
US Billboard 200	28

== Certifications ==
Region	Certification	Certified units/sales
Canada (Music Canada)	Platinum	100,000^{^}
United Kingdom (BPI)	Gold	100,000^{^}
United States (RIAA)	Gold	500,000^{^}
^{^} Shipments figures based on certification alone.
