= JamMan =

JamMan may refer to:

- Lexicon JamMan, a looper device for electric musical instruments
- DigiTech JamMan, a looper device unrelated to the Lexicon JamMan
