= The Tower That Ate People =

Song by Peter Gabriel

from the album OVO
- Released: 2000
- Length: 4:49
- Label: Real World Records
- Songwriter: Peter Gabriel
- Producers: Peter Gabriel; Simon Emmerson; Brian Transeau

"The Tower That Ate People" is a song written and recorded by English musician Peter Gabriel. It is the seventh track on Gabriel's soundtrack album OVO, which was released in 2000 as the commissioned work to the Millennium Dome Show. Whereas several songs on OVO were sung by different vocalists, "The Tower That Ate People" is one of the few songs on the album where Gabriel is the lead singer.

"The Tower That Ate People" has been remixed by Steve Osbourne and was performed on several tours. Pitchfork described "The Tower That Ate People" as "Gabriel's funkiest track since "Sledgehammer", with growling verse vocals, phased guitars, overdriven organ, and a gorgeously haunting bridge melody." Ryan Reed of Rolling Stone called the song a "buzzing industrial-rock epic" that "remains one of Gabriel's most exhilarating post-So arrangements."

== Background ==
The basis of "The Tower That Ate People" was a groove developed by Gabriel. Its working title was "100 Days to Go", which first appeared on multi-media CDs that accompanied the Real World Notes series, a publication distributed by Real World Records from the late 1990s to the early 2000s. The three-note riff found in the song originated from a flute, which was later processed with distortion to resemble an electric guitar. The song includes elements from industrial music, including loud dynamics and an extensive use of looping; the song's bridge is softer and more subdued.

The song's lyrics relate to the intertwining of technology and civilisation; these themes are attached to the plot of OVO, which centers on a quarrel between fictional specimens known as the skypeople and earthpeople. "The Tower That Ate People" appears in Act 2, which is described in the liner notes as the industrialised period of the plot. Gabriel adopted the character of Ion in the story, who Gabriel described as an "industrial megalomaniac". Ion's primary goal in OVO is to build an industrial empire for the purpose of enslaving people. To achieve the voice of Ion, Gabriel delivered his lines in a distorted and bluesy voice that he likened to the work of Dr. John.

With the exception of the bridge and the "we're building up and up" lyric, which Gabriel sings four times on the OVO recording, most of the remaining vocals were processed with fuzz and distortion. Some aspects of "The Tower That Ate People" conceptually mirror the Tower of Babel, a structure found in Christian theology that is destroyed by Yahweh to punish mankind for their attempts at constructing a building that could reach the sky.

According to the pan-European publication Music & Media, "The Tower That Ate People" was the 13th most aired song in Poland during the week of 24 June 2000.

== Remixes and live performances ==
The song was remixed by Steve Osbourne for the Red Planet soundtrack in 2000 and was also included on a 12-inch promotional disc. An edit of the remix appeared on Gabriel's Hit compilation album in 2003. The Red Planet Remix was also included on Gabriel's Flotsam and Jetsam digital compilation album in 2019. A different remix from Hague appeared on a promotional disc distributed to individuals who had attended listening events for Gabriel's Up album in 2002, which later became a subscriber-exclusive track on Gabriel's Bandcamp account in 2025.

Gabriel performed "The Tower That Ate People" on his tours promoting his 2002 Up album, starting in 2003 and extending into his 2004 Still Growing Up Tour. Performances of the song were illuminated with eight Martin Atomic 3000s, which also provided strobe effects. A live performance of "The Tower That Ate People" appeared on Gabriel's Still Growing Up: Live & Unwrapped, a DVD film released in 2005. Gabriel also played the song in 2009 for some performances in South America.

On Gabriel's 2012–2014 Back to Front Tour, "The Tower That Ate People" was performed as one of the encores along with "Biko". Stuart Arnold, who reviewed Gabriel's 2014 in Glastonbury for The Northern Echo, highlighted the lighting effects for the song and praised its "spectacular staging". A live recording of "The Tower That Ate People" was included on Gabriel's 2014 Back to Front: Live in London live album/DVD, which was recorded from two shows at The O2 Arena in October 2013. Gabriel also occasionally played the song on the North American leg of his 2023 I/O The Tour, where it sometimes appeared as one of the encores.

=== Back to Front Tour ===
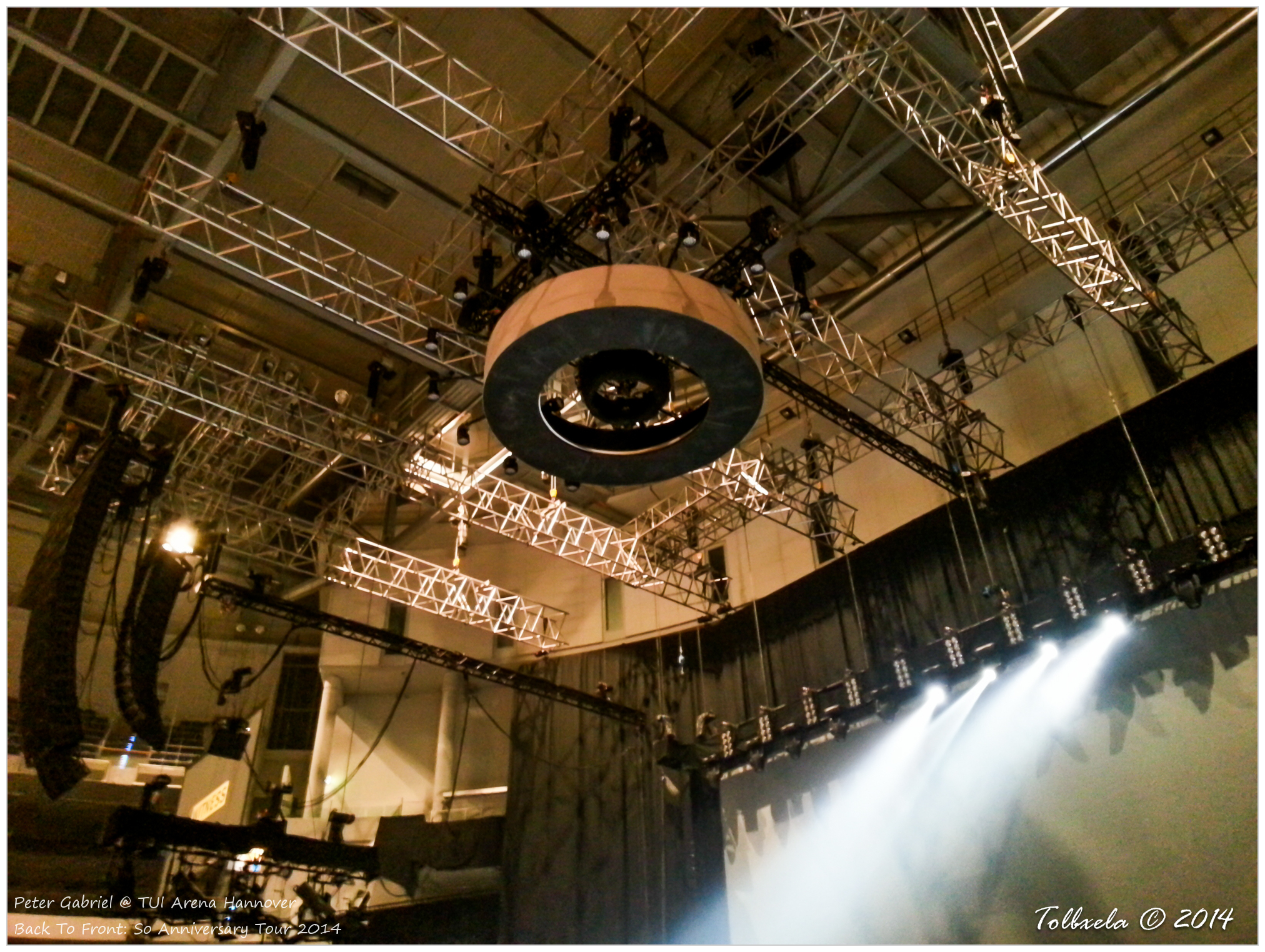
The "tower" on the ceiling.

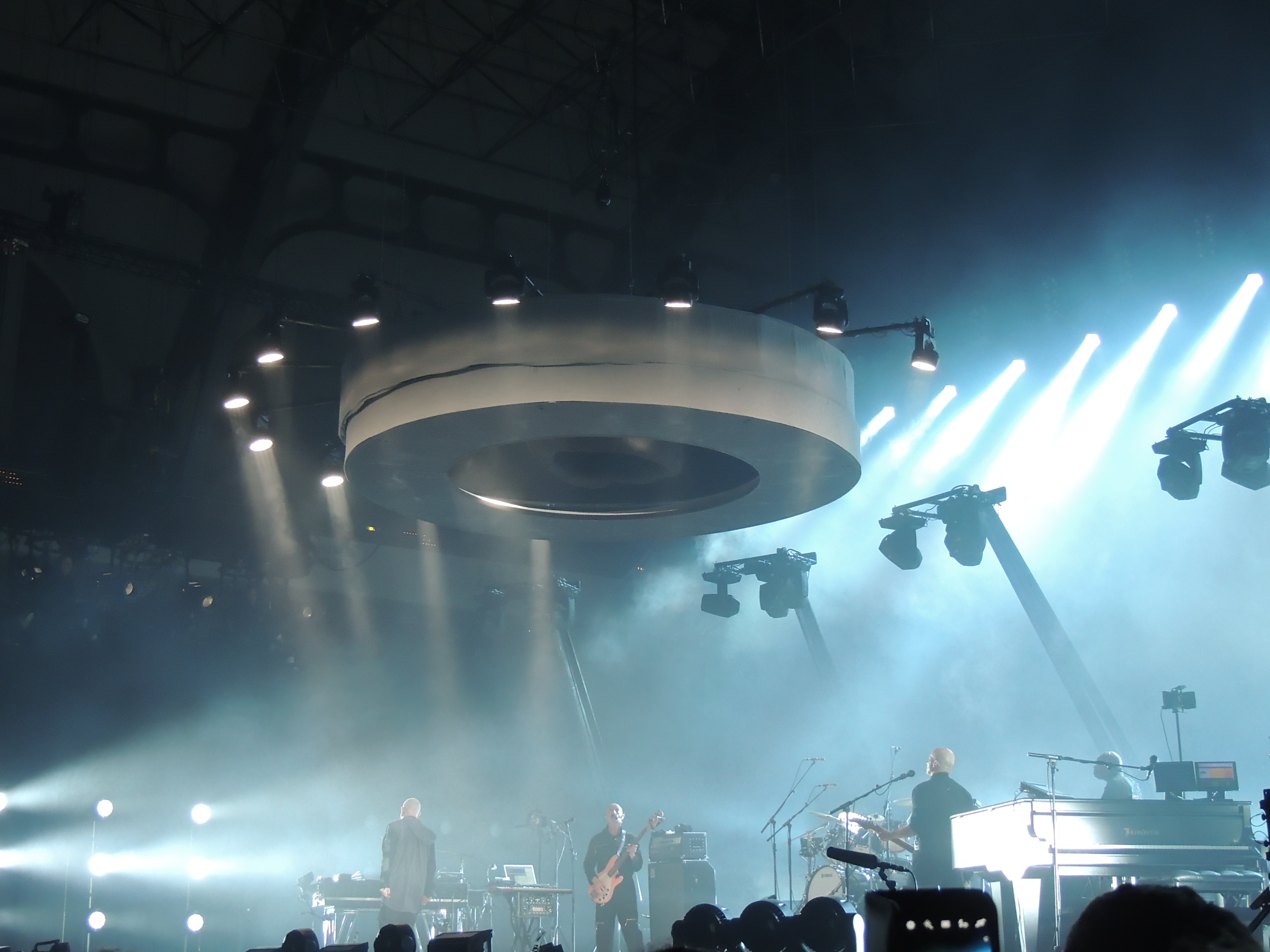
The "tower" descends ...

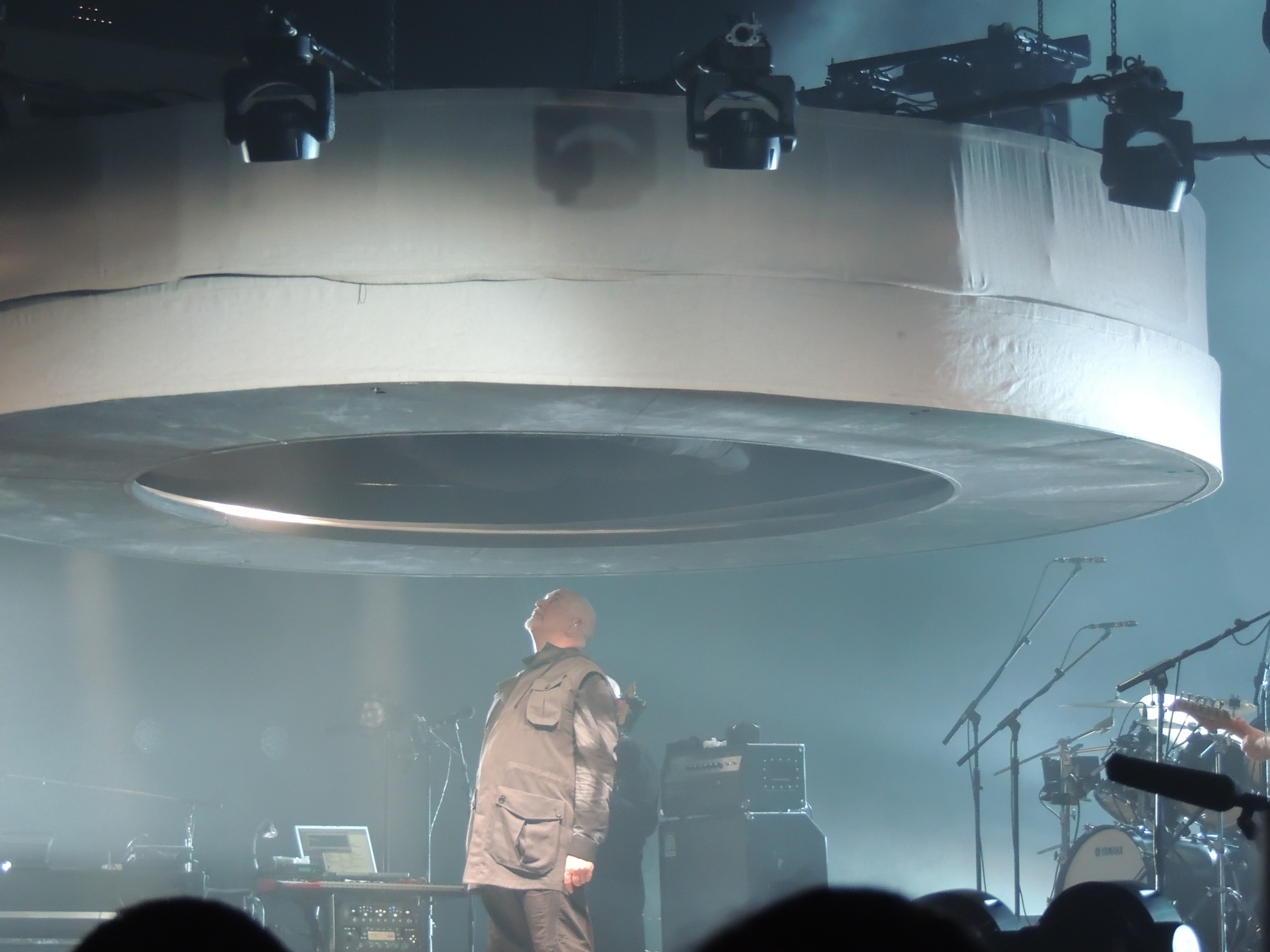
... and swallows Peter ...

== Personnel ==
- Peter Gabriel – vocals, keyboards, treatments, synth bass
- David Rhodes – guitar
- Tony Levin – bass
- Manu Katché – drums
- Richard Chappell – drum programming, loops, end toms
- Brian Transeau – programming, fills, chorus guitar
