= OVO (album) =

Soundtrack album by Peter Gabriel
- Released: 12 June 2000
- Recorded: Late 1998 – October 1999
- Length: 62:00
- Label: Real World
- Producer: Peter Gabriel; Simon Emmerson; Brian Transeau

Peter Gabriel chronology
Secret World Live (1994)	OVO (2000)	Long Walk Home: Music from the Rabbit-Proof Fence (2002)

Alternative cover
- Limited edition CD cover (initially sold exclusively at the Millennium Dome Show)

Professional ratings
Review scores
Source	Rating
AllMusic	2.5/5 stars
Pitchfork	6.8/10
Sputnikmusic	4/5 stars

OVO (also released as OVO: The Millennium Show) is a soundtrack album by English singer-songwriter and musician Peter Gabriel and his eleventh album overall. It was released on 12 June 2000 by Real World Records as the commissioned work to the Millennium Dome Show, a multimedia performance show that ran 999 times at the Millennium Dome in Greenwich, London between 1 January and 31 December 2000. Unlike most albums in his discography, Gabriel delegated some of the lead vocals to other singers, including Elizabeth Fraser, Richie Havens, and Paul Buchanan.

== Background ==
Gabriel was already working on the songs for his 2002 album Up, which was slated for release in 2001 at the time, when he started work on OVO: "'Ovo' was going to be a six-month diversion. In the end it took two years." Initially, work was being done simultaneously on both Up and OVO for a few months, separately by engineers Richard Chappell and Richard Evans (respectively). However, in November 1998, both engineers decided to focus on completing the OVO soundtrack, so work on Up was temporarily put on hold.

Mark Fisher, creative director of the Millennium Dome, had asked Gabriel to write the music for the Millennium Dome Show. Gabriel agreed to work on the project as collaborator: "I told Mark if he wanted a full collaborator to create something with a story and visual ideas, then I would love to do it. The appeal was that it was a huge project which offered the ability to dream up some crazy things, and there was a budget there to pay for it." The bad public image and the problems revolving around the Millennium Dome were taken by Gabriel as a challenge: "I knew what I was walking into and that it was a quite unpopular project. But the fact that it was going to be controversial was actually what attracted me."

Douglas Hodge would join Fisher and Gabriel as a writer in 1998, before being assigned as director in the same year, on the condition that the Walt Disney World Resort near Orlando, Florida would sponsor the show, and later ship the whole stage and set over to the Resort for a future attraction.

== Writing ==
Comparing the album with 2002's Up, Gabriel saw a number of differences: "It's referential to folk music, and there are futuristic elements that I wouldn't normally work with. 'Ovo' has an external focus, whereas the other album I've been working on is more internally focused." "Different versions of Britain" piqued Gabriel's interest, including a traditional Britain with folk references and "a more contemporary Britain, which would be more multi-cultural. It would include Asian, African, [and] Australian elements that have all helped to make a fuller picture of what Britain is now."

Gabriel worked with multiple vocalists on Ovo, including Elizabeth Fraser, who took on the character of Sofia in the album's story. He felt that her voice would be suitable for the project based on her work with Cocteau Twins and Massive Attack. Fraser familiarized herself with the story by watching a 20-minute generated film some unfinished tracks that Gabriel had prepared. Gabriel selected Paul Buchanan to sing the parts of Skyboy. Buchanan had a "vague idea" of what the album's story was based on various storylines, titles, and characters that were placed throughout the walls of Gabriel's recording studio, where the two worked the vocal delivery for certain songs.

On "The Tower That Ate People", Gabriel took on the role of Ion, an "industrial megalomaniac" found in the second act of the story. Musically the song was built around an electronic groove and a distorted flute riff. Gabriel deliberately chose rap as genre in the opening track "The Story of OVO" where singer Neneh Cherry and rapper Rasco narrate the story line: "I wanted to make it appeal to kids, and rap seems to be their No. 1 music these days." Iarla Ó Lionáird recorded the gaelic vocals on "Low Light", which also featured a ney flute and bassline played on a Nord keyboard. Richard Evans and Simon Emmerson contributed some of the folk music ideas that were incorporated into "Weaver's Reel". The closing track, "Make Tomorrow", was initially demoed during the sessions for So under the name "This Is the Road" before being substantially redeveloped for OVO. The original demo was later released in 2005 for members of Gabriel's fan club.

== Release ==
The album was released in two different versions. The double CD edition with the title "OVO The Millennium Show" contains a different cover and booklet, a comic book and bonus track "The Tree That Went Up". It was initially sold exclusively at the Millennium Dome Show. The track listing for this version is shifted in comparison to the other version. The track "The Story of OVO" has been moved to the additional CD. Every CD of every edition includes a multimedia part with the time lapse video "The Nest That Sailed the Sky". While the single CD version's booklet contains an introduction by Peter Gabriel and lyrics, the double CD version's booklet contains a short summary of the story, statements of artists involved and images from the Millennium Dome Show. The single CD release of OVO removed Alison Goldfrapp's name from the credits.

Prior to the official release the album was made available to the public through a web promotion campaign called "Web Wheel" with three tracks not available on the album. The tracks were individually distributed to different interlinked sites timed to expire at the official release date.

Upon its release, OVO was the highest charting album released by Virgin Records in Italy, having also replaced Iron Maiden as the highest ranking UK artist on the album chart in that country.

== Live performance ==
Gabriel performed "Father, Son", "The Tower That Ate People", "White Ashes", and "Downside Up" over the course of the Growing Up and Still Growing Up tours. Melanie Gabriel provided backing vocals for "Downside Up". These performances are available on the live albums Growing Up Live and Still Growing Up: Live & Unwrapped. "Downside-Up" and "The Nest That Sailed The Sky" were also performed as part of The New Blood Tour in 2010 and 2011, the former as a duet between Peter and Melanie Gabriel and the latter as the closing, orchestra-only track of the show. "Father, Son" was also performed. These performances are available on the New Blood Live in London DVD. "The Tower That Ate People" also appears on the Back to Front: Live in London DVD released in 2014.

== The Story of OVO ==
The Story of OVO was released in the CD-booklet-shaped comic book which was part of the CD edition with the title "OVO The Millennium Show".

=== Act I: The man who loved the earth ===
Long ago on the island of Albion lived Theo, a man who loved the earth. He was engaged in agriculture and could enjoy successful harvests. Nature provided him and his people with everything they needed to live. His wife Beth was strong and intuitive. She was able to concentrate strongly on the activity of weaving. Their son Ion was busy with ideas to improve the world. His sister Sofia was a dreamer and lived in her own world. One evening, she saw a forest in a pond from the sky's reflection. That's how she first discovered the existence of Skypeople and fell in love with Skyboy. Theo was annoyed by this and followed her into the woods. He drove Skyboy and his companions away. Theo was worried about his daughter and the mysterious strangers. He tried to find another man for his daughter but she rejected all of them because she had the same stubbornness as Theo in her veins. Theo understood that she would do exactly what she herself wanted. During a festival, a storm destroyed the family's barn. Theo tried to save what he could, but died from a falling beam in the burning barn.

=== Act II: The tower that ate people ===
Theo's death left a great emptiness in his village. His son Ion discovered at a campfire how iron could be extracted from ore with the help of burning coal. He began to develop machines made of iron, which would decisively change the lives of the villagers in agriculture and all other areas to an industrial society. He built a large tower of iron on the island with a city inside. Ion assured everyone that no one would be exposed to the dangers of nature there anymore. The tower kept growing with the help of materials from all parts of the world. Beth was nevertheless worried, she felt that nature was now only a prisoner inside the tower. The Skypeople had only the choice to live outside the tower in poverty or inside the tower in slavery. The Skypeople were getting weaker and weaker and could do nothing about how the once fertile land was turning into a dry desert. Sofia met up with Skyboy again in what was left of the forests. Ion developed more and more fears and blamed the Skypeople for everything that changed for the worse. He saw Skyboy as his enemy from now on and imprisoned him in the tower, blaming him for Theo's death. Even Beth could not stop him. Sofia allowed the Skypeople to attack the tower, as she hoped to free Skyboy. The tower was captured by the Skypeople and Skyboy was freed. Ion understood what he had created, threw himself from the top of the tower and died. His mother Beth mourned for her son. The tower was blown up by the Skypeople and collapsed.

=== Act III: The nest that sailed the sky ===
Sofia discovered that her mother Beth had been killed by the rubble of the tower and mourned her loss. She had now lost her entire family and Skyboy was gone. At Ion and Beth's funeral, she remembered her happy childhood surrounded by her family. She planted an acorn from her old house that she found in her pocket. Suddenly she met Skyboy again, who took her above the clouds. Sofia became pregnant. On the day of her wedding, a tree grew from her mother's grave. The oak tree quickly grew bigger and bigger. Then the great rain began and the dry land was filled with life again. But the rain didn't stop, the Skypeople couldn't fly because their wings got wet. The water kept rising. Skyboy and Sofia called everyone to the big oak tree to save themselves. Sofia became the leader of all, the child inside her was getting heavier and heavier. The tree remained the only thing still peeking out. The child of Skyboy and Sofia was born. His eyes and brows formed the word OVO, and so gave his name. The water did not recede for several months. Sofia discovered that if she looked up into the sky, she could fall in it. The whole top of the world was spinning upside down. She told the others about a dream of how a nest with her son could sail into the sky. They made a nest out of twigs and put food in it and OVO in its center. The nest with OVO went up to the sky. Sofia was very sad, but at the same time she saw in the faces of the others more hope than ever before. The nest disappeared into the sky. The last thing they could see was a blue ball floating away.

=== Personnel ===
- Douglas Hodge – director
- Peter Gabriel, Bob Baker – story and text development
- Douglas Hodge, Peter Gabriel, Mark Fisher – original show concept
- Richard Chappell – engineer
- Richard Evans – engineer
- Charlotte Cory – additional text
- Christian Perret – illustration concept and design
- Georges Crisci – illustrations
- Zadok Ben-David – frontispiece
- Marc Bessant – book design
- Martha Ladly – design co-ordination
- Michael Bond – book text

== Track listing ==
All tracks are written by Peter Gabriel, except for “The Weaver's Reel”, co-written with Richard Evans.

No.	Title	Length
1.	"The Story of OVO"	5:21
2.	"Low Light"	6:37
3.	"The Time of the Turning"	5:06
4.	"The Man Who Loved the Earth/The Hand That Sold Shadows"	4:15
5.	"The Time of the Turning (Reprise)/The Weaver's Reel"	5:37
6.	"Father, Son"	4:55
7.	"The Tower That Ate People"	4:49
8.	"Revenge"	1:31
9.	"White Ashes"	2:34
10.	"Downside-Up"	6:04
11.	"The Nest That Sailed the Sky"	5:05
12.	"Make Tomorrow"	10:01

OVO: The Millennium Show CD 1
No.	Title	Length
1.	"Low Light"	6:39
2.	"The Time of the Turning"	5:08
3.	"The Man Who Loved the Earth/The Hand That Sold Shadows"	4:12
4.	"The Time of the Turning (Reprise)/The Weaver's Reel"	5:39
5.	"Father, Son"	4:55
6.	"The Tower That Ate People"	4:45
7.	"Revenge"	1:28
8.	"White Ashes"	2:40
9.	"Downside-Up"	6:02
10.	"The Nest That Sailed the Sky"	4:53
11.	"The Tree That Went Up"	2:17
12.	"Make Tomorrow"	10:18

OVO: The Millennium Show CD 2
No.	Title	Length
1.	"The Story of OVO"	5:21

== Personnel ==
The numbers in brackets refer to the single CD edition.

- Peter Gabriel – production, vocals (1, 4, 6, 7, 9, 12), keyboard (1, 3, 5, 7, 9, 10, "The Tree That Went Up"), percussion (1, 4), drone treatments (2), tanpura (2), piano (2, 6, 12), synthesizer (2, 6, 11, 12), string arrangements (2, 3, 10–12, "The Tree That Went Up"), piano loops (3), hammer dulcimer treatments (3), crotales (3, 4), African percussion (3, 5), claps (4), strings (5), synth bass (5, 10), brass arrangements (5, 6), treatments (7), keyboard bass (7, 12), keyboard treatments (8), bass (9), backing vocals (10), programming (10, 12), surdu (10, "The Tree That Went Up"), Peruvian drum (10), synth guitar (10), calliope (12)
- Simon Emmerson – production (5b), drum programming (5), bells (5), finger cymbals (5)
- Brian Transeau – production (12), programming (7), fills (7), chorus guitar (7), string arrangements (12), drum programming (12), nord programming (12), bass (12)
- Richard Chappell – engineering, programming, mixing (1, 4a, 7–9), treatments (1, 4, 7, 9), drum programming (1, 3, 4, 7–9, "The Tree That Went Up"), loops (7), end toms (7)
- Richard Evans – engineering, programming, mixing (1–3, 4b–6, 10–12, "The Tree That Went Up"), synthesizer (1), nord bass (2), treatments (3, 11), guitar loops (3), mandola (3, 5, 12), flute (3, 5), hammer dulcimer (3), crotales (4), claps (4), bass (5), drum programming (5, "The Tree That Went Up"), shaker (5), 12 string electric guitar (10, 12), 12 string acoustic guitar (10), electric guitar (12), percussion (12)
- Edel Griffith – additional engineering
- Alan Coleman – additional engineering
- Neneh Cherry – rap (1)
- Rasco – rap (1)
- Ganga Giri – didgeridoo (1, 4)
- The Dhol Foundation – dhol drums (1, 4, 5, 8, 10, "The Tree That Went Up")
- Johnny Kalsi – master drums (1, 4, 8, 10, "The Tree That Went Up"), dhol drum (5), tabla (5)
- Jim Barr – bass (1, 4), upright bass (12), 12 string acoustic guitar (12)
- Hossam Ramzy – finger cymbals (1, 4), dufs (1), tabla (4), crotales (4)
- James McNally – bodhran (1, 4, 5), whistle (4, 5), piano accordion
- Iarla Ó Lionáird – vocals (2)
- Shankar – additional vocals (2), double violin (2, 11)
- Kudsi Erguner – ney flute (2)
- Jocelyn Pook – string arrangements (2, 3, 10, 11), strings (5)
- Electra Strings – strings (2, 3, 10–12, "The Tree That Went Up"), string arrangements (5)
- Richie Havens – vocals (3, 12)
- Ged Lynch – shakers (3), drums (12)
- David Bottrill – mixing (3, 7, 10, 12), end rhythm section recording (10)
- Omi Hall – vocals (4, 9)
- David Rhodes – guitar (4, 7, 10, 12, "The Tree That Went Up")
- Nigel Eaton – hurdy gurdy (4, 5)
- Stuart Gordon – fiddle (5), viola (5)
- Jim Couza – hammer dulcimer (5)
- The Black Dyke Band – brass (5, 6, 10, 11)
- James Watson – conducting (5, 6, 10, 11)
- Will Gregory – brass arrangements (5, 6, 10)
- Elizabeth Purnell – brass orchestration (5, 6, 10, 11), brass arrangements (10, 11)
- Tony Levin – bass (6, 7, 10), midsection bass (12)
- Manu Katché – drums (7, 10)
- Adzido – drums (8, "The Tree That Went Up")
- George Dzikunu – master drummer (8, "The Tree That Went Up")
- Sussan Deyhim – screams (9)
- Steve Gadd – drums (9)
- Elizabeth Fraser – vocals (10, 12)
- Alison Goldfrapp – vocals (3, 5)
- Paul Buchanan – vocals (10, 12)
- Babacar Faye – sabar (10)
- Assane Thiam – talking drum (10)
- Carol Steel – congas (10), shaker (10)
- Tchad Blake – mixing (10, 12)
- Daniel Lanois – end rhythm section recording (10), flutey section recording (12)
- Jacquie Turner – end rhythm section recording assistant (10), additional percussion session (12), mixing assistant (12)
- Markus Dravs – additional percussion session (12)
- David Bascombe – flutey section recording (12)
- Tony Cousins – mastering
- York Tillyer – E-CD, E-CD video, front and back cover photographs (double CD edition), additional photography (double CD edition)
- Ben Wakeford – E-CD
- Lee Parry – E-CD
- Nils-Udo – images (single CD edition)
- Marc Bessant – graphic design, additional photography (single CD edition)
- Anna-Karin Sundin – additional photography (single CD edition)
- Dennis Kunkel – microscopy images (single CD edition)
- Gideon Mendel – additional photography (double CD edition)
- Peter Nicholls – dome exterior photographs (double CD edition)
- Athena Connal – graphic design (double CD edition)
- Tristan Manco – graphic design (double CD edition)
- Martha Ladly – design coordination

== Charts ==
Chart (2000)	Peak position
Australian Albums (ARIA)	90
Belgian Albums (Ultratop Wallonia)	20
Dutch Albums (Album Top 100)	66
European Albums (Music & Media)	12
French Albums (SNEP)	28
German Albums (Offizielle Top 100)	14
Italian Albums (FIMI)	4
Scottish Albums (OCC)	28
Swedish Albums (Sverigetopplistan)	54
Swiss Albums (Schweizer Hitparade)	27
UK Albums (OCC)	24
