= Long Walk Home: Music from the Rabbit-Proof Fence =

Soundtrack album by Peter Gabriel
- Released: 15 April 2002
- Recorded: Late 2000–2001
- Studios: Real World, Box, UK; AIR (London); The Lavanderia (Los Angeles); Hype (Singapore)
- Genre: Worldbeat
- Length: 58:57
- Label: Real World
- Producer: Peter Gabriel

Peter Gabriel chronology
OVO (2000)	Long Walk Home: Music from the Rabbit-Proof Fence (2002)	Up (2002)

Singles from Long Walk Home: Music from the Rabbit-Proof Fence
- 1. "Cloudless" Released: 2002

Long Walk Home: Music from the Rabbit-Proof Fence, released in June 2002, is the fourth soundtrack album and twelfth album overall by the English rock musician Peter Gabriel. Devised as the soundtrack to the Australian film Rabbit-Proof Fence, it was the first release of new music by Peter Gabriel since OVO, a commissioned work for the Millennium Dome Show in 2000. The soundtrack contains elements from and references to songs which Peter would release on his album Up. The track "A Sense of Home" samples the drum loops used on "No Way Out". "Running to the Rain", "Crossing the Salt Pan", and "The Return" are reworked arrangements of "Signal to Noise", track nine of Up. "Ngankarrparni" and "Cloudless" are reworked arrangements of track three, "Sky Blue".

The track "Running to the Rain" was used in the pre-release trailer for Mel Gibson's "The Passion of the Christ", then, simply called "The Passion".

== Critical reception ==
Professional ratings
Aggregate scores
Source	Rating
Metacritic	(74/100)
Review scores
Source	Rating
AllMusic	4/5 stars
BBC	Favourable
Billboard	Favourable
Entertainment Weekly	A−
The Rolling Stone Album Guide	4/5 stars

Billboard included Long Walk Home in its reviews Spotlights section, deeming it "to deserve special attention on the basis of musical merit and/or Billboard chart potential". Billboard reviewer Bradley Bambarger recommended the album to fans of Gabriel's album Passion—the soundtrack for the film The Last Temptation of Christ—writing, "the intrepid artist's soundtrack to the Australian film Rabbit-Proof Fence should prove nearly as compelling". He described the album as "atmospheric, often ominously so" and as having "a cumulative emotive power" due to its "interwoven motifs".

== Track listing ==
All music is composed by Peter Gabriel, except where noted.

No.	Title	Length
1.	"Jigalong"	4:03
2.	"Stealing the Children"	3:19
3.	"Unlocking the Door"	1:57
4.	"The Tracker"	2:47
5.	"Running to the Rain"	3:18
6.	"On the Map"	0:58
7.	"A Sense of Home"	1:59
8.	"Go Away Mr Evans"	5:14
9.	"Moodoo's Secret" (Music by Richard Evans, Gabriel and David Rhodes)	3:02
10.	"Gracie's Recapture"	4:40
11.	"Crossing the Salt Pan"	5:07
12.	"The Return (Parts 1, 2 and 3)"	10:25
13.	"Ngankarrparni (Sky Blue – Reprise)"	6:01
14.	"The Rabbit-Proof Fence" (Music by Evans, Gabriel and Rhodes)	1:08
15.	"Cloudless"	4:49

== Personnel ==
=== Musicians ===
- Peter Gabriel – keyboard (1–5, 7–13, 15), Surdu (1), clap sticks (2), piano (8, 13, 15), vocals (10, 13, 15), drum programming (13), production
- Richard Evans – hammered dulcimer (1, 11), 12 string guitar (1), clap sticks (1–3, 5, 10), bowed crotales (2), bass (5, 9, 11–13, 15), piano (6), guitar (7), shaker (8), whistle (10, 12), keyboard (13), acoustic guitar (15), arrangements, mixing, production (1–14), recording
- David Rhodes – surdu (1–4, 7–12), percussion (1), keyboard bass (1), clap sticks (2, 3, 5, 10), vocals (2, 9, 10), digeridoo (2, 7), guitar (5, 7, 9, 11), hit (7), shaker (8, 11, 12), gong (12), electric guitar (13, 15), backing vocals (13, 15), berimbau (14), acoustic guitar (15), arrangements, mixing (1–14), production (1–14)
- Ged Lynch – drums (1, 5, 8–10, 13, 15), percussion (1, 2, 5, 7, 8, 11, 13, 15), toms (2)
- Electra String – strings (1, 7, 12)
- Jangangpa Group – voices (1, 7, 11)
- Myarn Lawford – voices (1, 7, 11, 14), wailing (2, 14), vocals (9, 11, 13, 15)
- Elsie Thomas – voices (1, 7, 11)
- Jewess James – voices (1, 7, 11)
- Rosie Goodji – voices (1, 7, 11)
- The Dhol Foundation – dhol drums (2, 5, 10)
- Adzido – percussion (2, 9, 10)
- Johnny Kalsi – galloping percussion (2)
- Ningali Lawford – wailing (2, 14), vocals (13, 15)
- Shankar – double violin (3, 5–7, 10, 12, 14)
- London Session Orchestra – strings (3, 5, 11, 12)
- Gavin Wright – violin (3, 5, 10–13, 15)
- Jackie Shave – violin (3, 5, 10–13, 15)
- Ganga Giri – didgeridoo (4–8, 10–12, 15)
- James McNally – bodhran (5)
- Hossam Ramzy – finger cymbals (5)
- B'Net Houariyat – vocals (5)
- Alex Swift – programming (8, 13, 15)
- Tomasz Kukurba – violin (8)
- Jerzy Bawoł – accordion (8)
- Mahut – percussion (8)
- Doudou N'Diaye Rose – African loops (8)
- Chuck Norman – programming (9, 10, 13, 15), keyboard (10, 13, 15)
- Babacar Faye – djembes (9)
- Assane Thiam – talking drum (9)
- Nusrat Fateh Ali Khan – vocals (11)
- The Blind Boys of Alabama – vocals (13, 15)
- Peter Green – electric guitar (13, 15)
- Richard Chappell – drum programming (13, 15), tambourine loops (15), additional recording
- Manu Katché – drums (13, 15)
- David Sancious – Hammond organ (13, 15)
- Sheryl Carter – wailing (14)
- Quantec – drones (14)
- Dmitri Pokrovsky – kalyuka, sampled (14)
- Stephen Hague – drums (15), bass programming (15), mixing (15), production (15)

=== Technical personnel ===
- Edel Griffith – assistant engineering, additional recording, additional engineering
- Marco Migliari – assistant engineering
- Dan Roe – assistant engineering
- Paul Grady – assistant engineering
- Steve Orchard – additional recording, additional engineering
- Michael Brook – additional recording, additional engineering
- Derek Zuzarte – additional recording, additional engineering
- Kevin Quah – assistant additional recording, assistant additional engineering
- Yang – assistant additional recording, assistant additional engineering
- Tchad Blake – London Session Orchestra treatments
- Tony Cousins – mastering
- Andrew Skeoch – birds and dingoes recording (1, 4, 7, 9, 10–12)
- Sarah Koschak – birds and dingoes recording (1, 4, 7, 9, 10–12)
- Marc Bessant – graphic design
- Susie Millns – design coordination
- Dorothy Napangardi – front cover painting
- Jimmy Pike – back cover of booklet painting, inside inlay and CD face painting
- Matthew Nettheim – photography
- Penny Tweedie – photography
- Merv Bishop – photography

== Charts ==
Chart (2002)	Peak position
German Albums (Offizielle Top 100)	78
Italian Albums (FIMI)	34
