= Growing Up (Peter Gabriel song) =

2002 single by Peter Gabriel

Single by Peter Gabriel

from the album Up
- Released: 2003
- Length: 7:33
- Label: Geffen; Real World
- Songwriter: Peter Gabriel
- Producers: Peter Gabriel; Steve Osborne

Peter Gabriel singles chronology
"More Than This" (2002)	"Growing Up" (2003)	"Burn You Up, Burn You Down" (2003)

"Growing Up" is a song by English rock musician Peter Gabriel from his 2002 album, Up. The song was released as the third single from Up and reached the top 40 in Italy. It was also included on the Growing Up Live concert film in 2003.

== Background ==
Lyrically, "Growing Up" centers around the brevity of human life. Gabriel developed the song by pulling from various developments in his personal life, including the death of his brother in-law and the aging of his parents. He said that "there's this sense very often that people seem to retain their 17-year-old selves through out life in some way, they may peg it at a different age but I don't think people feel old internally or very rarely."

"Growing Up" opens with a series of keyboards, processed drums, and a descending melodic line played on a cello. The cello was the only sound on Up that originated from a sample library, specifically from an Akai S3200, a device Gabriel first used on Passion in 1989. Following the first verse, the rhythm changes to become more dance-oriented. Further elements, including a bright organ and various electronic flourishes are also featured throughout the composition. Tchad Blake achieved some of the tape scratching sounds found on the song by spinning some sampled drum fills around on a tape machine. Some of the vocals were processed with a Lexicon JamMan, which was responsible for creating some of the "elephant-like sounds" as described by engineer Richard Chappell.

The single art was created by M. Richard Kirstel and features an image of a wet wooden doll titled Waterbaby. A music video was also created to accompany the song, which was directed by Francois Voge. Portions of the music video depict digital recreations of urban sprawl through a fish-eye lens and individuals partaking in daily activities within bubble-shaped objects. When played live on his Growing Up tour, Gabriel performed the song while rolling around in a zorb: a transparent sphere similar to a large hamster ball. The song was also played on Gabriel's 2023 I/O tour, during which he played the song in a stripped-down campfire setting with drummer Manu Katché playing a Roland HandSonic.

== Track listing ==
7-inch single (2003)

1. "Growing Up" (Tom Lord-Alge radio edit) – 3:08
2. "Growing Up" (album version) – 7:33
3. "Growing Up" (Trent Reznor mix) – 6:31

CD (2003)

1. "Growing Up" (video) – 4:45
2. "Growing Up" (album version) – 7:33
3. "Growing Up" (Stabilizer remix) – 4:51
4. "Cloudless" (Radio Edit) – 1:32

== Personnel ==
Credits from the Up liner notes.

- Peter Gabriel – vocals, bass keys, sample keys, organ, MPC groove, JamMan
- David Rhodes – guitar, backing vocals
- Ged Lynch – drums, percussion
- Manu Katché – drums
- Tchad Blake – tape scratches
- Richard Chappell – programming
- Alex Swift – additional programming
- Pete Davis – additional programming
- AD Chivers – backing vocals

== Chart performance ==
Chart (2003)	Peak position
Italy (FIMI)	35
