= Darkness (Peter Gabriel song) =

Single by Peter Gabriel

from the album Up
- Released: 2004
- Genre: Progressive rock; art rock
- Length: 6:51 (album version); 14:10 (single remix)
- Label: SOG
- Songwriter: Peter Gabriel
- Producer: Peter Gabriel

Peter Gabriel singles chronology
"Burn You Up, Burn You Down" (2003)	"Darkness" (2004)	"Down to Earth" (2008)

"Darkness" is a song by English rock musician Peter Gabriel. It first appeared as the first song from his 2002 album, Up. Gabriel has since performed the song on several of his concert tours. A live version was included on the Growing Up Live concert film in 2003.

In 2004, a remixed version of the song labeled as the "Engelspost Remix" was released as a single in Switzerland. It was previously used as the B-side to "Burn You Up, Burn You Down". An instrumental version of "Darkness", titled "Darker Star", was included on the second season of Canadian sci-fi show Starhunter. In 2011, Gabriel re-recorded the song with an orchestra on his New Blood album.

== Background ==
The working title for "Darkness" was "House in the Woods"; it was also one of the first songs Gabriel finished for Up. When sequencing the running order for Up, Gabriel wanted an "uncomfortable track" to open the album and ultimately selected "Darkness" to fulfill that role.

The song opens with a 30-second synthesised intro utilising percussive textures with melodic blips, a kick drum, and cymbals. In an interview with Sound on Sound, engineer Richard Chappell explained that these sounds were derived from a spliced groove triggered through a keyboard; several of the percussion loops were created by Mahut Dominique.

The intro is bookmarked by Gabriel muttering the word "consequence", which is accompanied by what Peter Gabriel biographer Daryl Easlea described as a "sonic assault" that resembles the intro to King Crimson's "21st Century Schizoid Man" and a "death metal record". Chappell explained that the "aggressive loud noise" was achieved by distorting a conga drum with a Lexicon JamMan effect box. Other sounds, including an electric guitar played by David Rhodes and a scream were also layered underneath to augment the effect. David Stopps, an old friend of Gabriel, remarked that the song was "really uncompromising" and said that Gabriel "pushed the envelope" by making it the album's opening track.

It's almost unbearable to listen to. You can't listen to that, you have to turn it right down before you start or otherwise you might jump out of your skin when that comes in-it's not easy listening, but that's typical Peter.

Chappell said in his interview with Sound on Sound that a few people in Gabriel's inner circle objected to the placement of "Darkness" as the opening track on the album; he also claimed that some listeners accidentally broke their hi-fi loudspeakers from listening to the song. He maintained that the song "had so much muscle and it seemed like a fun idea to have the quiet intro and then the loud assault."

Verse 1 is sung in Gabriel's lower vocal register and addresses the various fears that make him feel minuscule, beginning with his unease about swimming in the sea. For the second verse, the song transitions into a louder section with studio effects that make "Gabriel's higher ranged voice seem almost satanic" according to author Durrell Bowman. Gabriel's distorted vocals were processed with a Sansamp and Line-6 audio plug-in, which were applied during the recording process rather than the production phase. Gentler musical passages follow both of these verses, where Gabriel sings in his normal register without any vocal treatments. The quieter instrumentation continues into the bridge, where the lyrics address the confrontation of the narrator's fears. This section, along with the twice-repeated endings to the verses, fulfill the role of a refrain. The song fades out with the same instrumentation as the intro, which is accompanied by processed vocal murmurs and incantations.

== Artwork ==
Each song on Up was accompanied by visuals from photographers in the album's liner notes. The photograph for "Darkness" was taken by Arno Rafael Minkkinen and features an arched torso with the remainder of the body submerged in a body of water.

== Critical reception ==
Writing for PopMatters, Andy Hermann highlighted the song's intro, saying that it "attacks the listener with techno-industrial shrieks and an almost Zeppelin-like, stomping backbeat." He also identified "Darkness" as one of the songs on Up that sounded like it took ten years to create. Entertainment Weekly singled out "Darkness" as a song where Gabriel "confront[s] his psychic scars with cathartic insight." Peter Menocal of Kludge wrote that the song was "an enigmatic crawler that taunts the listener into the seductive depths of this screaming Atlantis...The song lashes out and recalls near Trent Reznor-like quality in its composition. Gabriel whispers spoken word only to fall into his trademark ballad. He becomes lost under a layer of instrumentation that is a treat to dissect."

In Spin magazine, Brad Sanders wrote that the song "screeches and groans like a mirror-universe Nine Inch Nails." Author Graeme Scarfe thought that listeners who expected a retread of So or Us would likely find the song unsettling, further calling it the least accessible song on Up. Alexis Petridis of The Guardian was critical of certain lyrics, specifically the line about "being mothered with my balls shut in the pen".

== Track listing ==
12 inch single

1. "Darkness" (Engelspost remix) – 14:10
2. "Darkness" (Greed Meet Engelspost remix) – 10:53
3. "Darkness" (Engelspost radio edit) – 4:11

== Personnel ==
Credits from the Up liner notes

- Peter Gabriel – vocals, Bösendorfer, keyboards, MPC groove, mutator, Lexicon JamMan
- Tony Levin – bass guitar
- David Rhodes – guitars
- Manu Katché – drums
- Dave Power – drums
- Ged Lynch – percussion
- Dominque Mahut – percussion
- Richard Chappell – programming, percussion
- Alex Swift – additional programming
- The London Session Orchestra – strings
- Nick Ingman – orchestration
