= Sky Blue (song) =

Song by Peter Gabriel

from the album Up
- Released: 2002
- Length: 6:37
- Label: Charisma
- Songwriter: Peter Gabriel
- Producers: Peter Gabriel; Stephen Hague; Steve Osbourne

"Sky Blue" is a song written and recorded by English musician Peter Gabriel. In September 2002, it appeared on Gabriel's seventh studio album, Up. Fragments of the song were also used on Gabriel's soundtrack album Long Walk Home: Music from the Rabbit-Proof Fence, which preceded the release of Up by a few months.

== Background ==
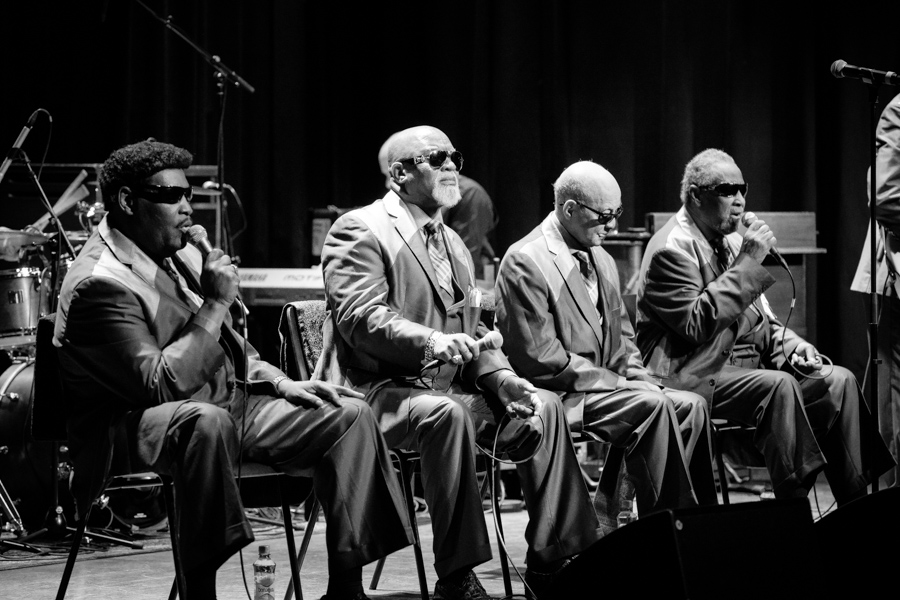
The Blind Boys of Alabama sang backing vocals on "Sky Blue"

The origins of "Sky Blue" date back to the 1980s, around 15 years before the song's eventual release on Up in 2002. Gabriel first developed the main riff, which he earmarked for future use. He recorded a version of the song for the Us album in 1992, but it went unused. Gabriel returned to the song for Up, making it the oldest song on the album. In comparison to the demo recorded for Us, which Gabriel described as having a band oriented arrangement, the version found on Up features sparser instrumentation. Five months prior to the release of Up, segments from the chorus of "Sky Blue" were included on "Ngankarrparni" and "Cloudless" from Gabriel's Long Walk Home: Music from the Rabbit-Proof Fence, which served as the soundtrack for the Australian film Rabbit-Proof Fence.

Gabriel was influenced by soul music when creating "Sky Blue", so he asked The Blind Boys of Alabama to overdub some vocals, which were ultimately included in the final two minutes of the song. Five members from The Blind Boys of Alabama participated in the recording session. Gabriel had been contemplating the addition of some male voices at the end of "Sky Blue" and felt that he "couldn't think of anyone better to do it." He remarked that vocal group had "extraordinary voices" and were "extraordinary people too, but the voices are lived in and they have a different type of quality to them than young voices. I think that it's one of my favourite emotional bits on the record."

The instrumentation for "Sky Blue" includes electronic loops, shaker-oriented percussion, gentle bass tones, and bright resonant guitars. In addition to Gabriel's touring band, the song also features Daniel Lanois, who produced Gabriel's studio albums from 1984-1992, on guitar and percussion. Gabriel also collaborated with Peter Green, a British guitarist who he admired growing up. The two of them conducted two recording sessions, one of which was at Real World Studios and another at Green's home studio. Gabriel asked Green to play a guitar solo that resembled the music he grew up with, but Green instead decided to provide a supporting role that focused more on texture. Other than the Hammond organ played by David Sancious, Gabriel covered most of the keyboards on "Sky Blue", including one instrument identified in the liner notes as firefly keys. Richard Chappell, who served as one of the engineers for Up, said that the firefly keys referred to a patch from a GigaSampler, which is a PC-based sampler.

== Critical reception ==
Writing for PopMatters, Andy Kerman expressed his opinion that the long gestation time of "Sky Blue" reflected the ten-year development time of Up. He also praised the vocals from The Blind Boys of Alabama and compared them to "the same pop-gospel terrain occupied by 'Don't Give Up'" off Gabriel's 1986's So album. Peter Menocal of Kludge noted how Gabriel's "raspy" vocal delivery guided the instrumentation. Writing for CMJ magazine, Chris Nicksong highlighted the song's "trembling optimism." In his book Without Frontiers: The Life and Music of Peter Gabriel, Daryl Easlea called "Sky Blue" the "pure standout" on Up and also believed that it should have been released as the album's first single instead of "The Barry Williams Show".

== Live performances ==
The Blind Boys of Alabama served as the opening act for Gabriel's Growing Up concert tour from 2003-2004. During the tour, Gabriel's manager asked the band to perform onstage alongside Gabriel for an encore. One of the members, Clarence Fountain, objected to this on the grounds that it would require the band to wait several hours before they were required to perform. Charles Driebe, who served as the manager for The Blind Boys of Alabama, informed Gabriel's manager that the band was "more interested in hotel rooms than an encore" but were still open to perform a song earlier in the set. Gabriel accepted this accommodation and agreed that the band would join him onstage every night to perform "Sky Blue".

Gabriel started performing "Sky Blue" on the Growing Up tour with the Blind Boys of Alabama beginning on 12 November 2002 and continued to do so for the remainder of the tour. He had previously played the song during his tour stop in Mexico City without the band. "Sky Blue" appeared as the fifth song of the set and was played after "Secret World". During these performances, Fountain, Jimmy Carter, Joey Williams, and George Scott sat in a compass formation on a platform situated in the middle of the stage. The stage and an egg-shaped fixture suspended from the ceiling were illuminated with azure colors and projections of clouds. Gabriel positioned himself behind the keyboards for the song's first two verses before venturing out to the outer portions of the stage that rotated against his movements. During the final chorus of these performances, Gabriel and his daughter Melanie would exit the stage as the Blind Boys of Alabama's platform rose from below the stage. For the vocal harmonies, Fountain hit the lowest notes and Carter covered the upper registers. Andy Gill of The Independent called "Sky Blue" a highlight of the set and praised The Blind Boys of Alabama for their "uplifting gospel moans".

== Personnel ==
Credits from the Up liner notes.

- Peter Gabriel – vocals, Bosendorfer, firefly keys, bass pulse, MPC groove
- David Rhodes – guitar, backing vocals
- Daniel Lanois – guitar, percussion
- Peter Green – guitar
- Tony Levin – bass guitar
- David Sancious – Hammond organ
- Manu Katché – drums
- Ged Lynch – percussion
- Richard Chappell – programming
- Alex Swift – additional programming
- Melanie Gabriel – backing vocals
- The Blind Boys of Alabama – guest vocals
