= The Bollywood Brass Band =

The Bollywood Brass Band is a brass band playing Bollywood and traditional Indian music, based in London, England.

The band was formed in 1992 to perform with the Shyam Brass Band from Jabalpur, India, at the International Festival of Street Music in London. They have continued to perform and record in a wide variety of musical styles, including Hindi film hits, Bhangra, qawwali, Punjabi folk songs, and wedding songs, tinged with influences from jazz, other world musics, and modern dance music. They perform at weddings, world-music and street-music festivals, and cultural festivals.

The Bollywood Brass Band is made up of eleven musicians, playing saxophones, trumpets, trombones, sousaphone, and snare and bass drums and also features Johnny Kalsi and members of the Dhol Foundation on dhol drums.

In 1995 the band created a parallel performing group: SamBhangra! plays both Indian and Brazilian music and consists of the horns and drums section of the Bollywood Brass band together with a samba bateria (a nine-piece percussion section), the Dhol Foundation (five Indian dhol drummers), the Four by Four Dancers (four Bhangra–Punjabi folk-style dancers), and four Brazilian samba dancers.

== Discography ==
- 1999: The Bollywood Brass Band (Emergency Exit Arts)
- 2002: Rahmania (Emergency Exit Arts)
- 2005: Movie Masala (Emergency Exit Arts)
- 2016: Carnatic Connection, feat. violinist Jyotsna Srikanth
- 2018: Carnatic Suite, A Day in Bangalore (EP), feat. violinist Jyotsna Srikanth
