= The Bollywood Brass Band (album) =

Studio album by The Bollywood Brass Band
- Released: 1999
- Recorded: 1999
- Genre: Indian music
- Length: 42:09
- Label: Emergency Exit Arts
- Producer: Joe Cohen

The Bollywood Brass Band chronology
Movie Masala (2005)	The Bollywood Brass Band (1999)	Rahmania (2002)

The Bollywood Brass Band is the first album by The Bollywood Brass Band.

Of the seven pieces (of which two are also provided as remixes), five are from Indian films ("Kehna Hi Kya" and "(Ek Ho Gaye) Hum Aur Tum" from the Tamil film Bombay, "Hawa Hawa" from Pop, "Pardesi Pardesi" from the Bollywood film Raja Hindustani, and "Mehndip Laga Ke Rakhna" from the Bollywood film Dilwale Dulhania Le Jayenge), one ("Gur Nalon Ishk Mitha") is a traditional Punjabi melody, and one ("Loay Loay Aaja Mahi") is by Muzammal Safri.

== Track listing ==
1. "Loay Loay Aaja Mahi" (Safri)
2. "Gur Nalon Ishk Mitha" (trad. Punjab–Sagoo)
3. "Kehna Hi Kya" (Rahman–Mehboob; arr. Moore)
4. "(Ek Ho Gaye) Hum Aur Tum" (Rahman–Mehboob)
5. "Hawa Hawa" (Ashraf)
6. "Pardesi Pardesi" (Shrava–Samir)
7. "Mehndi Laga Ke Rakhna" (Jatin-Lalit–Bakhshi)
8. "Gur Nalon Ishk Mitha" [remix]
9. "Kehne Hi Kya" [remix]

=== Arrangements ===
- 1–3 & 6: Sarha Moore
- 4 & 7: Kay Charlton
- 5: Shyam Brass Band & Gregg Moore
- 8: Sambhangra remix by Joe Cohen & Larry Whelan
- 9: Snake Eyes remix by Sanjeve

(Recorded at the Dairy, Brixton.)

== Personnel ==
- Sarha Moore — soprano saxophone, alto saxophone, percussion
- Joe Cohen — soprano saxophone, tenor saxophone, percussion
- Kay Charlton — trumpet
- Will Embliss — trumpet
- Ros Davies — trombone
- Dave Jago — trombone
- Johnny Kalsi — dhol
- Philippe d'Amonville — drums, percussion
- Nick Cattermole — bass drum, tabla, percussion
- Alice Kinloch — sousaphone
- Mark Allan — baritone saxophone
