= Up (Peter Gabriel album) =

Studio album by Peter Gabriel
- Released: 23 September 2002
- Recorded: April 1995 – October 1998 (principal recording); Early 2000 – April 2002 (additional recording)
- Studios: Real World (Box, UK) (principal recording); The Meduse (Senegal); Real World Mobile (France); AIR (London); Hype Studios (Singapore) (additional recording)
- Genres: Art rock; progressive rock; electronic; ambient
- Length: 66:40
- Labels: Geffen (US and Canada); Virgin; Real World
- Producers: Peter Gabriel; Stephen Hague; Steve Osbourne

Peter Gabriel chronology
Long Walk Home: Music from the Rabbit-Proof Fence (2002)	Up (2002)	Hit (2003)

Peter Gabriel studio album chronology
Us (1992)	Up (2002)	I/O (2023)

Singles from Up
- 1. "The Barry Williams Show" Released: 16 September 2002; 2. "More Than This" Released: 30 December 2002; 3. "Growing Up" Released: 30 June 2003; 4. "Darkness" Released: 2 August 2004 (Switzerland only)

Up is the seventh studio and thirteenth album overall by the English rock musician Peter Gabriel, released on 23 September 2002 through Geffen and Real World Records. The album rose to number 9 in the US, number 11 in the UK, and captured the number 1 position in Italy. The album debuted with sales of 76,000 units in the US and was the highest-charting album on the Billboard 200 from a British artist that week.

Most critics reviewed Up positively. This would be Gabriel's last studio album of new original material until the release of I/O (2023), although he did release several studio projects in the interim (including a covers album, Scratch My Back, in 2010, followed a year later by an album of orchestral re-recordings, New Blood).

Gabriel supported the album with a world tour in 2003 called Growing Up, his first in ten years since the Secret World Tour. Gabriel's Growing Up tour included backing vocals by his daughter Melanie. Select dates were filmed and released as Growing Up Live.

== Background ==
Gabriel started work on the album in the spring of 1995. He and engineer Richard Chappell travelled between different locations during the initial writing stages of the album using a portable setup (recording at Real World Studios in between): the first two months were spent in a rented chalet in Méribel, then three months in Senegal starting in October 1995, followed by another trip to Méribel in Spring 1996 and a brief recording stint on a friend's recording-studio-equipped boat along the Amazon in Summer 1997. From then on, the rest of the album work was based at Real World Studios, where further writing, recording, overdubbing, editing and mixing took place over the next four to five years. Gabriel commented that he opted to record at these locations because he believed that they would be conducive to creativity. He recalled that he found it difficult to record in Senegal due to the heat, which was further exacerbated by the lack of air conditioning there. During his time in France, Gabriel would write and record in the morning and evening and ski during the afternoon.

At one point, work was being done simultaneously on both Up and the OVO soundtrack for a few months, separately by engineers Chappell and Richard Evans (respectively). However, in November 1998, both engineers decided to focus on completing the OVO soundtrack, so work on Up was temporarily put on hold. Tony Levin participated in some of the recording sessions beginning in 1996 and said in a 2000 interview with Virtual Guitar Magazine that Gabriel had yet to finalise the lyrics.

By late 2000, work on the album was finally gathering renewed pace, with a string section recorded at AIR Lyndhurst Hall Studios in London. At this time, Gabriel said that he had roughly 100 ideas to choose from. Gabriel also considered the idea of distributing a set of finished songs to different locations across the world situated near rivers to complete their own mixes, with names of the spinoff albums including Up the Mississippi, Up the Amazon, and Up the Ganges.

Discussing the recording sessions, Manu Katché said that the band would often record roughly six or seven takes in succession, amounting to over 15 minutes of material. Gabriel would store everything that had been recorded onto his computer and assemble each song with his favorite parts from those sessions. Tchad Blake was invited to Real World Studios in early 2001 to begin the final mixing stage. He would work on the mixes in the Big Room in Real World Studios, while Gabriel and Chappell continued recording in the Writing Room. Between them, they would figure out which of the newly recorded parts would be used in the mix or not.

Its name was Up from the start, though at one point the name I/O was considered (which Gabriel started work on during the making of Up and OVO as well, though it would not be released until 2023): "I think 'I/o' is a good title because I noticed a lot of the songs were about birth and death and a little bit of in and out activity in between." In 1998, Gabriel learned that R.E.M. also intended to release an album bearing the same title, but decided to keep it after consulting with the band and much consideration: "I have been living in an 'Up' world for four years now and have no wish to come down." In the months preceding the album's release, video clips of Gabriel talking about the songs as well as short demos of each song were released at the coming of every full moon on Gabriel's official website.

== Songs ==
The album's lyrics deal mostly with birth and especially death. The opening track, "Darkness" was one of the first songs completed for the album and is about overcoming fears. "Growing Up" is a summation of life put to a pulsating beat. "Sky Blue", according to Gabriel, was the oldest song from the album, dating back to the Us recording sessions. The song also featured contributions from Peter Green and The Blind Boys of Alabama. "No Way Out" was built around a composite of programmed and live drums, with some of the processing being provided by a SuperCollider, resulting in a "granulated" effect according to Gabriel.

"I Grieve" was conceived after Gabriel looked over his catalogue of music as if it were a catalogue of emotional tools. He found one major missing tool to be one to cope with death and therefore "I Grieve" was born. Gabriel performed the song live on the television show Larry King Weekend on the first anniversary of September 11 attacks in the US, during which Gabriel said that his two daughters were living in New York City and he could not contact them for some time, and that "I Grieve" was for people who did not hear anything from their relatives then. It was not, however, written specifically for 9/11, having appeared in an earlier version on the City of Angels soundtrack in 1998.

The first single from Up, "The Barry Williams Show" is a down-beat song dealing with reality talk shows such as Jerry Springer (in fact, The Brady Bunch star Barry Williams appeared as an audience member in the Sean Penn-directed music video for the song with Requiem for a Dream actor Christopher McDonald playing the titular talk show host). "My Head Sounds Like That" was built around the sounds of a malfunctioning DeltaLab Echo Unit. The song's lyrics reference a heightened awareness of sound and smell when in different emotional states.

"More Than This" was one of the album's final additions. Gabriel achieved some of the melodic motifs through a Fender Telecaster, which he sampled with a keyboard. The song "Signal to Noise" features guest vocalist Nusrat Fateh Ali Khan, whose vocal performance was salvaged from the VH1 performance on 28 April 1996 following his death in 1997. Originally he performed the song in a "much starker" form, before Gabriel transformed it into a strings-oriented piece as the cornerstone of the album. Finally, "The Drop" consists of only Gabriel and a Bösendorfer grand piano.

== Formats and release ==
The album cover features five water drops in a diagonal line, over a blurred background of Gabriel's face. Each drop contains a refracted image of Gabriel. Similar to Us, the album cover does not include any text. Up used specially commissioned photographs representing each song in the liner notes.

The album was made available in stereo on CD and vinyl, while surround sound versions are encoded in Super Audio CD, and DTS DVD-A. Additionally, the album was released for download in 5.1 surround sound encoded in Windows Media Audio 9, marking the first time an album was sold online in a multichannel digital format. The vinyl records were printed by Classic Records in 180g and 200g variants, with the mastering process being completed by Bernie Grundman.

Some promotional CDs were distributed to the media prior to the release of Up. "Burn You Up, Burn You Down" was included on these copies and planned for inclusion on Up before Gabriel withdrew it from the track listing over his belief that it did not "come from the same family as the rest of the songs on the album."

To promote Up, "The Barry Williams Show" was serviced to radio stations in August as the album's lead single. Gabriel held a performance at Virgin Germany's 20th anniversary on 31 August 2002. The following month, market promo visits were conducted in that country along with France, Italy, and Spain. He also performed a live session at Real World Studios on 13 September 2002, which was filmed for a 12 October broadcast on BBC Radio 2. Over 50 individuals, including members of European television crews and record label executives were among the people present at Real World Studios for the performance, where Gabriel and his backing band played several tracks from the album, including "Darkness", "Growing Up", "More Than This", and "The Barry Williams Show". Gabriel commented that the performance was "a brave idea" and that the set could have benefited from additional preparation and rehearsals. The album was released on 23 September 2002 by Geffen Records in North America and Real World/Virgin Records in Europe.

Gabriel reflected on the album in an 2007 interview with Uncut, where he called it a "darker album" that bore some similarities with his third and fourth solo albums, adding that "it didn't do very well, but I felt it had some of my best work."

== Critical reception ==
Professional ratings
Aggregate scores
Source	Rating
Metacritic	74/100
Review scores
Source	Rating
AllMusic	3/5 stars
Entertainment.ie	4/5 stars
Entertainment Weekly	A−
The Guardian	3/5 stars
Kludge	7/10
Pitchfork	7.2/10
Rolling Stone	2/5 stars

According to the review aggregator Metacritic, Up received "generally favorable reviews" based on a weighted average score of 74 out of 100 from 16 critic scores.

Stephen Thomas Erlewine of AllMusic said that Up was not immediately accessible, but "grows stronger, revealing more with each listen." Pitchfork praised the first half of the album, but was more critical of the last five songs on the album, singling out "My Head Sounds Like That" for being "shapeless" and dismissing both "More Than This" and "Signal to Noise" as uncreative compositions that "will entertain only the least critical in Gabriel's audience." Greg Kot wrote in Rolling Stone that the record's inspired moments were "muted by dirges". He concluded the review by calling Gabriel "out of touch".

While Entertainment Weekly criticized "The Barry Williams Show" for being a "muddled stab at social criticism", they were more complimentary of some of the album's other material such as "Darkness" and "No Way Out". They further stated that "those who value the emotional nakedness of his best work will find much to treasure on Up." Entertainment.ie described the production as both "claustrophobic and womblike - which is entirely appropriate for an album that's heavily preoccupied with solemn ruminations on childhood and, less frequently, death." They found some of the compositions to be "lengthy, disparate collages bordering on the unbearably pretentious", but were more complimentary of Gabriel's vocals.

== Track listing ==
All tracks are written by Peter Gabriel, except where noted.

No.	Title	Length
1.	"Darkness"	6:51
2.	"Growing Up"	7:33
3.	"Sky Blue"	6:37
4.	"No Way Out"	7:53
5.	"I Grieve"	7:25
6.	"The Barry Williams Show"	7:16
7.	"My Head Sounds Like That"	6:29
8.	"More Than This"	6:02
9.	"Signal to Noise" (featuring Nusrat Fateh Ali Khan)	7:36
10.	"The Drop"	2:59
Total length:		66:40

Early promotional CD tracklist
No.	Title	Writer(s)	Length
1.	"Darkness"		6:50
2.	"Growing Up"		7:48
3.	"Sky Blue"		6:37
4.	"No Way Out" (titled as "Don't Leave")		7:41
5.	"I Grieve"		7:24
6.	"Burn You Up, Burn You Down"	Gabriel, Karl Wallinger, Neil Sparkes	5:03
7.	"The Drop"		2:58
8.	"The Barry Williams Show"		7:13
9.	"My Head Sounds Like That"		6:26
10.	"More than This"		5:57
11.	"Signal to Noise" (featuring Nusrat Fateh Ali Khan)		7:35
Total length:			71:32

== Personnel ==
=== Musicians ===
- Peter Gabriel – vocals (all tracks), piano (1, 3–4, 7–8, 10), keyboards (1, 3, 5), JamMan (1–2), MPC groove (1–4, 6, 8–9), electronics (1, 3, 6, 8–9), organ (2, 6, 8), bass keys (2, 5–6, 9), sampled keyboards (2, 4), bass guitar (4), harmonium (4), Telecaster (4, 6), crotales (4), tom–tom (4), samples (5, 9), harmonica (6), reversed strings (6), string samples (6), Mellotron (6–7, 9), sampled guitar (8)
- Tony Levin – bass (1, 3–8)
- David Rhodes – guitars (1–4, 7, 9), guitar (6, 8), electric guitar (5), backing vocals (2–3, 6, 8–9)
- Manu Katché – drums (1–3, 5–7)
- Dave Power – drums (1)
- Ged Lynch – percussion (1–9), drums (2, 6, 8)
- Dominque Mahut – percussion (1, 7)
- Richard Chappell – programming (1–2), percussion (1) treated loop (6), loop manipulation (7)
- Alex Swift – additional programming (1–3)
- The London Session Orchestra – strings (1, 9)
- Will Gregory – string arrangements (1, 9)
- Isobel Griffiths – string contractor (1, 9)
- Nick Ingman – orchestrations (1, 9)
- Tchad Blake – tape scratches (2), groove treatment effects (6)
- Adrian Chivers – backing vocals (2)
- Pete Davis – additional programming (2)
- Blind Boys of Alabama – additional vocals (3), backing vocals (8)
- Melanie Gabriel – backing vocals (3, 8)
- Peter Green – guitar (3)
- Daniel Lanois – guitar (3), percussion (3)
- David Sancious – Hammond organ (3)
- Richard Evans – recorder (4), acoustic guitar (5)
- Mitchell Froom – backwards piano (4)
- Steve Gadd – drums (4, 9), percussion (9)
- Dominic Greensmith – drums (4, 8)
- Chris Hughes – drum programming (4)
- Hossam Ramzy – tabla (4), percussion (7)
- Danny Thompson – double bass (4)
- Stephen Hague – percussion (5)
- Chuck Norman – Spectre programming (5), bridge strings (5)
- L. Shankar – improvised double violin (5)
- Will White – percussion (5)
- Tony Berg – backwards guitar (6)
- Sally Larkin – backing vocals (6)
- Christian Le Chevretel – trumpet (6)
- Black Dyke Band – brass (7)
- Bob Ezrin – co–brass arrangement (7)
- Ed Shearmur – co–brass arrangement (7)
- Assane Thiam – percussion (7)
- Jon Brion – mandolin (8), Chamberlin (8)
- Nusrat Fateh Ali Khan – vocals (9)
- Dhol Foundation – dhol drums (9)

=== Technical personnel ===
- Peter Gabriel – production, design concept
- Steve Osbourne – additional production (2)
- Stephen Hague – co–production (5)
- Richard Chappell – recording, engineering
- Richard Evans – additional engineering
- Alan Coleman – assistant engineering
- Edel Griffith – assistant engineering
- Meabh Flynn – assistant engineering
- Dan Roe – assistant engineering
- Chris Treble – assistant engineering
- Ben Findlay – on–band recording session engineering
- Steve Orchard – orchestra engineering (1, 9)
- Derek Zuzarte – additional engineering (Blind Boys of Alabama vocals)
- Kevin Quah – additional engineering (Blind Boys of Alabama vocals)
- Yang – additional engineering (Blind Boys of Alabama vocals)
- Steve McLaughlin – additional engineering (Black Dyke Band)
- Tchad Blake – mixing (1–4, 6–9)
- Claire Lewis – mix assistant
- Marco Miglari – additional mix assistant
- Paul Grady – additional mix assistant
- Richard Evans – mixing (5)
- Stephen Hague – mixing (5)
- Kurt Hentschläger – granular synthesis
- Ulf Langheinrich – granular synthesis
- Marc Bessant – design concept
- Susie Millns – design coordinator
- Adam Fuss – photography
- Arno Rafael Minkkien – photography
- M. Richard Kirstel – photography
- Mari Mahr – photography
- Michal Rovner – photography
- Paul Thorel – photography
- Shomei Tomatsu – photography
- Susan Derges – photography
- Susan Derges – sleeve photography
- Dilly Gent – photo coordination

== Charts ==
=== Weekly charts ===
Weekly chart performance for Up
Chart (2002)	Peak position
Australian Albums (ARIA)	37
Austrian Albums (Ö3 Austria)	9
Belgian Albums (Ultratop Flanders)	21
Belgian Albums (Ultratop Wallonia)	4
Canadian Albums (Billboard)	2
Danish Albums (Hitlisten)	16
Dutch Albums (Album Top 100)	18
Finnish Albums (Suomen virallinen lista)	11
French Albums (SNEP)	4
German Albums (Offizielle Top 100)	4
Italian Albums (FIMI)	1
New Zealand Albums (RMNZ)	35
Norwegian Albums (VG-lista)	11
Polish Albums (ZPAV)	4
Scottish Albums (Official Charts)	13
Spanish Albums (AFYVE)	19
Swedish Albums (Sverigetopplistan)	6
Swiss Albums (Schweizer Hitparade)	4
UK Albums (Official Charts)	11
US Billboard 200	9
US Top Internet Albums	9

=== Year-end charts ===
Year-end chart performance for Up
Chart (2002)	Position
Canadian Albums (Nielsen SoundScan)	101
Canadian Alternative Albums (Nielsen SoundScan)	31

== Certifications ==
Certifications for Up
Region	Certification	Certified units/sales
Canada (Music Canada)	Gold	50,000^{^}
Germany (BVMI)	Gold	150,000^{^}
Japan	—	60,000
Switzerland (IFPI Switzerland)	Gold	20,000^{^}
United Kingdom (BPI)	Silver	60,000^{^}
United States	—	338,000
^{^} Shipments figures based on certification alone.
