= Jim Couza =

American string musician (1945-2009)

Jim Couza (April 27, 1945 – August 2, 2009) was an American hammered dulcimer player.

He was born in New Bedford, Massachusetts, United States,

Couza was one of the early musicians at Tryworks Coffeehouse in New Bedford, Massachusetts. In those days he played a well used, but good sounding Gibson guitar, and a banjo, and sang mostly British Isles music with a distinctive voice. He was living in Acushnet, Massachusetts in the early 1970s, which was when he started to play the hammer dulcimer.

He became a resident in England in 1982. In addition to the hammered dulcimer, Couza also played Appalachian dulcimer and guitar. He made several recordings, both solo and with the D'Uberville Ramblers. He also worked with Björk on the album Post, and with Peter Gabriel on his album, OVO. (Couza was featured on a track called "The Time Of The Turning (reprise) / Weavers Reel"). He also worked with Celtic singer-songwriter Jim Fox, performing at many venues and festivals around the UK. Couza suffered a number of health problems in his later years, resulting in amputation of both his legs.

Jim Couza died in August 2009 in England, at the age of 64.

== Discography ==
- Angels Hoverin' Round, Folktrax FTX-909 (1972)
- Brightest And Best, Greenwich Village GVR211 (1982)
- Music For The Hammered Dulcimer (a.k.a. The Enchanted Valley) (with Eileen Monger), Saydisc CD-SDL335 (1983)
- Friends & Neighbors, Greenwich Village GVR221 (1983)
- Appalachian Beach Party (with the D'Uberville Ramblers), Dragon Records, DRGNCD922 (1992)
- Out Of The Shadowlands, Folksound Records, FSCD14 (1993)
- Welcome To The Fair, Folksound Records, FSCD16 (1998)
- Jubilee, Folksound Records, FSCD06 (2002)
- Jim Jam, FSCM23, (1993) Cassette Tape with Jim Fox
