= Big Drum Small World =

Studio album by Dhol Foundation
- Released: 2001
- Recorded: 2001
- Studio: Wired Sound, Reading
- Genre: Bhangra
- Length: 63:59
- Label: Shakti Records
- Producer: Johnny Kalsi

Dhol Foundation chronology
Big Drum Small World (2001)	Drum-Believable (2005)

Professional ratings
Review scores
Source	Rating
Allmusic	4/5 stars

Big Drum Small World is the first studio album from Johnny Kalsi and his students from the Dhol Foundation institute in London. It was released in 2001 by Shakti Records and produced by Johnny Kalsi.

== Track listing ==
- All songs written by Johnny Kalsi, except where noted.
1. "Eik Din" 3:48
2. "Eik Din II" 2:59
3. "Iridian" (Kalsi, James McNally) 6:29
4. "Healing with Turmeric" (Kalsi, Sumeet Chopra) 6:08
5. "Shin the Mechanic" (Kalsi, Chopra) 5:39
6. "Poseidon" (Kalsi, Chopra) 5:12
7. "Seven Heaven" 7:13
8. "TDF meets DCS" (Kalsi, Chopra) 4:29
9. "Tere Bina" (featuring Natacha Atlas) 4:18
10. "Big Drum Small World" 5:49
11. "Colours of Punjab" 6:00
12. "Drummer's Reel" 5:46
