= Seamlessly loopable =

Seamlessly loopable is a term generally used for recordings or images that can be combined an infinite number of times without a noticeable joining seam. When used in music, animation, and video it generally refers to media that can be laid on a timeline, multiple times, back-to-back with no visible jump or jump cut as it cycles between the clips. In music this is referred to as looping and is commonly used by DJs and music producers when creating tracks.

When used in still images this is called tessellation and refers to an image that when laid left to right or top to bottom will join with itself with little or no visible seam.
