= Burn You Up, Burn You Down =

Single by Peter Gabriel

from the album Hit
- Released: 24 November 2003
- Genre: Rock
- Length: 4:14 (album version): 3:47 (single edit)
- Label: Reprise Records
- Songwriters: Peter Gabriel; Neil Sparkes; Karl Wallinger
- Producers: Peter Gabriel: Stephen Hague; Karl Wallinger

Peter Gabriel singles chronology
"Growing Up" (2003)	"Burn You Up, Burn You Down" (2003)	"Whole Thing" (2007)

Peter Gabriel singles chronology
"Whole Thing" (2007)	"Burn You Up, Burn You Down (Big Blue Ball Version)" (2008)	"Down to Earth" (2008)

"Burn You Up, Burn You Down" is a song co-written and performed by English rock musician Peter Gabriel. The initial recording sessions were conducted at Gabriel's Real World Studios in 1991, although the song would remain unreleased for another decade. Gabriel originally intended for the song to appear on his 2002 Up, but he ultimately pulled it from the track list shortly before the album's release. It was instead included on Gabriel's Hit compilation album the following year and released as a single, where it charted in both Italy and the UK. An alternate mix of "Burn You Up, Burn You Down" was also included on Big Blue Ball in 2008.

== Background ==
=== Composition and recording ===
The origins of "Burn You Up, Burn You Down" date back to the summer of 1991 during the first of three Real World Recording Weeks. Karl Wallinger of World Party and Neil Sparkes from Transglobal Underground co-wrote the song with Gabriel. The recording sessions took place in the workroom of Real World Studios, with Billy Cobham playing drums. Gabriel commissioned the help of multiple musicians around the world for this project, including western, Asian, and African artists. However, the tapes from these sessions took several years to organize, which delayed the song's release.

Richard Chappell, who engineered the recording sessions, recalled that the studio environment was loose, with "lots of red wine going around." He characterised the song as a "long groovy track" and said that the musicians finished the session around midnight, after which they listened to their efforts in the workroom of Real World Studios. Members of The Holmes Brothers were enlisted to record backing vocals; Gabriel commented that one of the members of the group, Popsy Dixon, had "a hauntingly beautiful voice, and he'd come up with these high notes that hit me hard every time he reached them." The song consists of two different back vocal parts: the first alternates with Gabriel on the verses and the other functions as the song's chorus. Snippets of the song appeared on Xplora1: Peter Gabriel's Secret World, a musical computer game released in December 1993.

=== Planned inclusion on Up ===
"Burn You Up, Burn You Down" was in contention to appear on Gabriel's Up album in September 2002. Earlier in July, the song was included on a promotional CD for Up distributed to the media, where it appeared as the sixth track. That same month, Gabriel spoke about the song in an interview with Nigel Williamson and called it "the odd man out on the album". Gabriel ultimately removed the song from the track list during the album's final review sessions. On his decision to pull the song from Up, Gabriel explained that it did not fit in with the rest of the album, but said that he wished to save it for a future release. The omission of "Burn You Up, Burn You Down" disappointed Gabriel's European label, who believed that the song was "radio friendly".

I've decided that it would not be on the album. I listened to it and I thought it wasn't sounding like the rest; it was like it did not come from the same family. When I record an album it's like going for a journey that will take you from on place to another. I like the song and it will certainly be on another record. It will not be replaced.

— Peter Gabriel

=== Later appearances ===
In November 2003, "Burn You Up, Burn You Down" was featured on the soundtrack for Uru: Ages Beyond Myst, which was developed by Cyan Worlds and published by Ubisoft. Gabriel said that the game "succeeded well in creating a feeling of other worlds in which mystery and imagination were the compelling elements", which he thought also reflected his approach in creating "worlds of sound".

That same month, it was the only new song to appear on Gabriel's Hit and also served as the album's lead single. The single version was edited by Ben Findlay and mixed by Stephen Hague and Richard Evans. The song's B-side was a 14 minute remix of "Darkness". Gregory Halvorsen Schreck took the photo for the single art, which features a person with a bag over their head. Marc Bessant, who designed the single sleeve, said that the photograph was "fun but sinister". He noted Gabriel's proclivity for distorting his face on his studio albums and commented that Schreck's photograph forwent a "recognisable face altogether."

Gabriel performed "Burn You Up, Burn You Down" on his Still Growing Up Tour in 2004 and included a live recording of the song on his Still Growing Up: Live & Unwrapped DVD film the following year. An alternate mix of "Burn You Up, Burn You Down" was later included on Big Blue Ball, an album consisting of songs that emerged from the Real World Recording Weeks during the 1990s. This version was serviced to Adult Album Alternative radio stations and received the biggest increase in plays from radio stations in that format for the week dated 30 May 2008 according to Radio & Records. The following week, the song debuted at number 28 on that publication's listing of the top 30 Triple A songs based on airplay measured by Nielsen BDS.

For the week dated 18 July 2008, "Burn You Up, Burn You Down" was ranked as the 18th most played song on 33 Adult Album Alternative radio stations monitored by Nielsen BDS and garnered 1.277 million million gross impressions. Based on data from 52 reporting Adult Album Alternative stations that week, "Burn You Up, Burn You Down" was the third most played song on that format with a total of 472 plays. That same month, the song peaked at number 18 on the Billboard Adult Alternative Airplay chart. A recording from a November 2003 live performance at Gabriel's Real World Studios was included on the digital-exclusive In the Big Room album in 2025.

== Track listing ==
1. "Burn You Up, Burn You Down" (Radio Edit) – 3:47
2. "Darkness" (Engelspost Remix) – 14:10

== Personnel ==
- Peter Gabriel – lead vocals, keyboards
- Justin Adams – guitar
- David Rhodes – guitar
- Jah Wobble – bass
- Wendy Melvoin – bass
- Billy Cobham – drums
- Arona N'diaye – djembe, sabar
- Tchad Blake – guitar synth, organ, skin shake, hi-hat, frame drum
- Chuck Norman – programming
- The Holmes Brothers – backing vocals
- Karl Wallinger – backing vocals
- Jules Shear – backing vocals

== Charts ==
=== 2003 version ===
Chart (2003–04)	Peak position
Italy (FIMI)	49
UK Singles (Official Charts)	78

=== 2008 version ===
Chart (2008)	Peak position
US Adult Alternative Airplay (Billboard)	18
