= More than This (Peter Gabriel song) =

2002 single by Peter Gabriel

"More Than This"

Single by Peter Gabriel

from the album Up
- Released: December 2002
- Length: 6:02 (album version); 4:30 (single edit)
- Label: Geffen; Real World
- Songwriter: Peter Gabriel
- Producer: Peter Gabriel

Peter Gabriel singles chronology
"The Barry Williams Show" (2002)	"More Than This" (2002)	"Growing Up" (2003)

"More Than This" is a song by English rock musician Peter Gabriel from his 2002 album, Up. The song was released as the second single from Up and became the only song from the album to chart in the UK, reaching number 47. It was also included on the Growing Up Live concert film in 2003. Live performances of the song featured projections of a balloon suspended above the stage.

== Background ==
Work on "More Than This" began late in the development process for Up. Daniel Lanois, who previously worked as a co-producer on some of Gabriel's previous albums, left a Fender Telecaster guitar behind at Real World Studios, so Gabriel decided to sample the instrument on a keyboard. Gabriel quipped that he "can't play guitar to save my life, but I can make noises on it." He drew further inspiration from a groove on a cassette that he encountered while traveling the Italian Alps.

The song begins with manipulated guitar sounds from Gabriel's keyboard, after which the first verse starts. These guitar samples also return in the song's second verse. Lyrically, the verses describe a long walk to an unfamiliar place and a vision of people struggling at sea. After the second chorus, which describes the narrator feeling 'alone and so connected', a quieter bridge emerges that borrows some of the lyrical motifs from the preceding section. Several electronic devices were used on the song, including a Mutator, which engineer Richard Chappell described as a filter box. Chappell explained that the terms "Mutator" and "Wonky Nord" were listed in the song's liner notes because of Gabriel's preference to credit instruments in a particular way that convey their utility.

== Release ==
Philippe Ascoli, who served as the managing director for Virgin UK when Up was released, said in an interview published in October 2002 that "More Than This" would be the second single released from the album after "The Barry Williams Show". He commented that "More Than This" would be primarily promoted on BBC Radio 2 "and other adult stations". Music Week reviewed the single in its 21 December 2002 edition of the magazine, which covered music scheduled for release between 30 December 2002 and 6 January 2003. The publication said that it was "arguably the standout track" from Up and served as "a return to the sleepy, organic textures of old, punctuated by a crystal-clear voice".

The single artwork was a photo taken by NASA. Marc Bessant, who designed the single art, received a book from Gabriel titled Full Moon, which featured over 30,000 negative images from the Apollo 11 moon landing. From those images, Bessant selected a picture of a footprint on the moon's surface. In the liner notes of Up, Susan Derge's photo Hermetica was included instead, which depicts nine objects resembling buttons in a circular formation.

"More Than This" was serviced to US adult album alternative radio stations for the week of 11 November 2002. By the end of the month, it was the most added song in that format according to Radio & Records. It debuted on the Radio & Records Triple A listing at No. 27, having received a total of 157 plays from 27 adult album alternative radio stations during the week of 11 December 2002, for a total of 1,562,700 audience gross impressions. For the week dated 28 December 2002, the song debuted and peaked at No. 20 on the Billboard 'Adult Alternative Airplay chart.

== Track listing ==
CD – PGSCD14

1. More Than This – Radio Edit – 4:30
2. More Than This – (The Polyphonic Spree Mix) – 5:08
3. More Than This – (Elbow Mix) – 5:05

12 inch single – PGST14

1. More Than This – (The Polyphonic Spree Mix) – 5:08
2. More Than This – (Elbow Mix) – 5:05
3. My Head Sounds Like That (Röyksopp Remix) – 8:24

== Personnel ==
Credits from the Up liner notes.

- Peter Gabriel – vocals, organ, piano, wonky Nord, sampled guitar, MPC groove, mutator
- Tony Levin – bass guitar
- David Rhodes – guitar, backing vocals
- Jon Brion – mandolin, Chamberlin
- Ged Lynch – drums, percussion
- Dominic Greensmith – drums
- Melanie Gabriel – backing vocals
- Blind Boys of Alabama – backing vocals

== Charts ==
Chart performance for "More Than This"
Chart (2002)	Peak position
Italy (FIMI)	39
UK Singles (Official Charts)	47
US Adult Alternative Airplay (Billboard)	20
