= Growing Up: Live =

2003 Peter Gabriel concert film

Video by Peter Gabriel
- Released: 3 November 2003
- Recorded: 8 and 9 May 2003
- Venues: Fila Forum (Milan, Italy)
- Genre: Rock
- Length: 133:54
- Labels: Geffen (US and Canada); Virgin Video
- Director: Hamish Hamilton
- Producer: Ian Stewart

Peter Gabriel chronology
Secret World Live (1993)	Growing Up: Live (2003)	Growing Up: A Family Portrait (2005)

Growing Up: Live

Live album by Peter Gabriel
- Released: 8 February 2019
- Recorded: 8 and 9 May 2003
- Venues: Fila Forum (Milan, Italy)
- Genre: Rock
- Length: 127:43
- Labels: EMI (UK); Republic (US and Canada); Real World

Peter Gabriel chronology
Back to Front: Live in London (2014)	Growing Up: Live (2019)	Rated PG (2019)

Growing Up: Live is a concert film by Hamish Hamilton and Peter Gabriel released on 3 November 2003. It features a live performance from Gabriel's 2003 "Growing Up" tour. The concert is notable for its dynamic set design by Robert Lepage. Also of note is the inclusion of Melanie Gabriel, his daughter, for backing vocals during these concerts. Bonus features include Tony Levin's photo album selections and an interview with Peter Gabriel about the story of Growing Up.

== Background ==
Gabriel spent part of 2002–2003 on tour in support of his album Up. The tour, called the "Growing Up" tour, visited 32 cities across North America and Europe. The concert video and live album were taken from the performances over two nights in May 2003 at Milan's Fila Forum, which was filmed by Hamish Hamilton with 26 cameras.

Gabriel described the idea behind the staging of the concert: "Last time [for the Secret World tour] we had two stages, a male stage and a female stage, and they were representing different things, urban, rural and this time we have moved the axis vertically, and it’s a sky stage and an earth stage. The album title had been UP, so there was a certain logic to this vertical translation onto the stage." Performing guests for the show included The Blind Boys of Alabama, Dr Hukwe Zawose, Charles Zawose, Sevara Nazarkhan and the voice of Nusrat Fateh Ali Khan.

To ensure that Growing Up: Live was released on its intended release date of 3 November 2003, Gabriel was promised by Warner Music Vision that they would only cover its production costs if Gabriel met their deadline. Warner Music Vision said that this release schedule was strictly imposed to ensure that they could coordinate with EMI Records to simultaneously release both Growing Up: Live and Gabriel's Hit compilation album. Promotional efforts were planned to advertise both Growing Up and Hit in both magazines and the press, although the director of marketing for EMI said that they encountered challenges with incorporating the DVD into television advertisements that centered around the artwork over their belief that the messaging became "too cluttered".

In 2019, the film was released as a live album on vinyl and music streaming platforms.

== Track listing ==
All tracks are written by Peter Gabriel.

No.	Title	Length
1.	"Here Comes the Flood"	8:37
2.	"Darkness"	8:39
3.	"Red Rain"	6:14
4.	"Secret World"	9:06
5.	"Sky Blue"	7:47
6.	"Downside Up"	7:36
7.	"The Barry Williams Show"	9:19
8.	"More Than This"	6:09
9.	"Mercy Street"	7:39
10.	"Digging in the Dirt"	7:36
11.	"Growing Up"	6:14
12.	"Animal Nation"	8:12
13.	"Solsbury Hill"	4:45
14.	"Sledgehammer"	4:59
15.	"Signal to Noise"	9:39
16.	"In Your Eyes"	11:34
17.	"Father, Son"	6:15
Total length:		2:13:54

== Personnel ==
- Peter Gabriel – lead vocals, keyboards
- Richard Evans – guitars, mandolin, whistles, backing vocals
- Melanie Gabriel – lead and backing vocals
- Tony Levin – bass, electric upright bass, backing vocals
- Ged Lynch – drums, percussions
- David Rhodes – guitars, backing vocals
- Rachel Z – keyboards, backing vocals

Guest musicians

- The Blind Boys of Alabama – additional backup vocals for "Sky Blue"
- Sevara Nazarkhan – additional backup vocals for "In Your Eyes"
- Toir Kuziyev – dutar (long necked oud) on "In Your Eyes"

== Charts ==
Chart performance for Growing Up: Live
Chart (2003–05)	Peak position
Dutch Music DVD (MegaCharts)	12
New Zealand Music DVD (RMNZ)	1
Portuguese Music DVD (AFP)	1
UK Music Videos (OCC)	10

== Certifications ==
Certifications for Growing Up: Live
Region	Certification	Certified units/sales
Argentina (CAPIF)	Platinum	8,000^{^}
France (SNEP)	Platinum	20,000^{*}
Germany (BVMI)	Platinum	50,000^{^}
New Zealand (RMNZ)	Platinum	5,000^{^}
Portugal (AFP)	Platinum	8,000^{^}
United Kingdom (BPI)	Gold	25,000^{*}
United States (RIAA)	Platinum	100,000^{^}
^{*} Sales figures based on certification alone.^{^} Shipments figures based on certification alone.
