= The Barry Williams Show =

2002 single by Peter Gabriel

Single by Peter Gabriel

from the album Up
- Released: 9 September 2002
- Length: 7:18 (album version); 4:44 (single edit)
- Label: Real World; Geffen; Virgin
- Songwriter: Peter Gabriel
- Producer: Peter Gabriel

Peter Gabriel singles chronology
"When You're Falling" (2001)	"The Barry Williams Show" (2002)	"More Than This" (2002)

"The Barry Williams Show" is a song by English rock musician Peter Gabriel from his 2002 album, Up. The song was released as the album's lead single and charted in various European countries. It was generally received unfavorably by music reviewers, with much of the criticism being levelled against both the music and the lyrics, which they found to be outdated and unpleasant. In 2003, the song received a Grammy nomination for Best Male Rock Vocal Performance, but it lost to Bruce Springsteen's "The Rising".

== Background ==
Gabriel wrote "The Barry Williams Show" as a commentary on TV culture to explore "the difference between the media persona and the real persona...how dysfunctional behaviour can be turned into profitable entertainment." He characterised the song as a "fable about reality TV", which he compared to junk food, saying that "you have an appetite for it, but it doesn't make you feel very good at the end of it."

When deciding on the name for the talk show host, Gabriel wanted something that sounded as if "it lived in TV land". He went through several different options before settling on the name Barry Williams. However, he was unaware that several notable individuals also possessed the same name, including a rugby player and an actor, the latter of whom starred in The Brady Bunch. Upon learning of the song's existence, the Barry Williams from The Brady Bunch questioned why he was invoked in the song, so Gabriel explained to Williams that the song's lyrical content did not relate to him. Gabriel was instead looking for a name that worked well musically; he was familiar with the Brady Bunch, but had failed to make the connection between the show and the actor. Williams later commented that "I guess it's just an English name. Or maybe I'm becoming so well known that I'm invading the subconscious of different people."

The drums on "The Barry Williams Show" were a composite of several tracks played by Manu Katché, which engineer Richard Chappell looped and treated through a sampler. Ged Lynch also provided additional drums and percussion to augment the parts that Katché recorded. Some electronic processing was applied to the vocals during the verses and outro; these effects are absent during the pre-chorus. Christian Le Cehretal contributed a trumpet solo during the instrumental interludes.

The lyrics detail the talk show host's desire for "dysfunctional excess" to maintain high viewership ratings. References to other television shows were also added to the song, including the "come on down" catchphrase from The Price is Right.

== Release ==
Prior to its release as a single, Gabriel reviewed the lyrics to determine if radio stations would find the song too controversial; Gabriel believed that none of the lyrics would have been out of place in a Sunday newspaper. Virgin Records ultimately created a special radio edit of the song. Certain radio stations in English-speaking countries declined to play the song, in part because of the lyrical content, which included references to sex. On the song's difficulties in attaining airplay, Gabriel expressed his belief that the lyrics were not "that bad compared with what I hear elsewhere. I don't think you can say the song is banned...but you could say that it is somewhat restricted."

In the United States, "The Barry Williams Show" was serviced to Triple A radio stations beginning the week of 12 August 2002 and was listed as the second most added song in that format by Radio & Records. The following week, the song debuted at number 19 on that publication's Triple A Top 30 chart, which documents airplay from 28 reporting Triple A radio stations. It received the biggest increase in adds and plays in this format, ultimately experiencing 212 plays from 19 Triple A radio stations. For the week dated 13 September 2002, "The Barry Williams Show" peaked at number nine on that listing, receiving a total of 344 plays from 22 reporting stations and 2,411,900 gross impressions. "The Barry Williams" also peaked at number nine on the Billboard Adult Alternative Airplay chart for the week dated 31 August 2002.

"The Barry Williams Show" was issued as a single in the UK on 9 September 2002. When Virgin Records attached a fourth track to the single, "The Barry Williams Show" became ineligible for the UK singles chart and instead qualified for the budget albums chart, where it peaked at number four on the week dated 21 September 2002.

== Artwork ==
The cover art uses an image taken by Paul Thorel titled Regardez Madame! L'Escargot Vola!. It was designed by Marc Bessant, who worked with Dilly Gent to find visual material that matched Gabriel's lyrics. Bessant had been unaware of Thorel's work, but he thought that ''Regardez Madame! L'Escargot Vola! effectively addressed the themes embedded in the song. The image features a distorted image of a woman's face, with only her right eye in focus. Thorel captured the image using digital photography and imposed scan lines on the woman's face. He said that the artwork represented the breakdown of "transmission and reception" and conceptually reflected the idea of "human beings voluntarily lost/immersed" in reality television.

== Music video ==
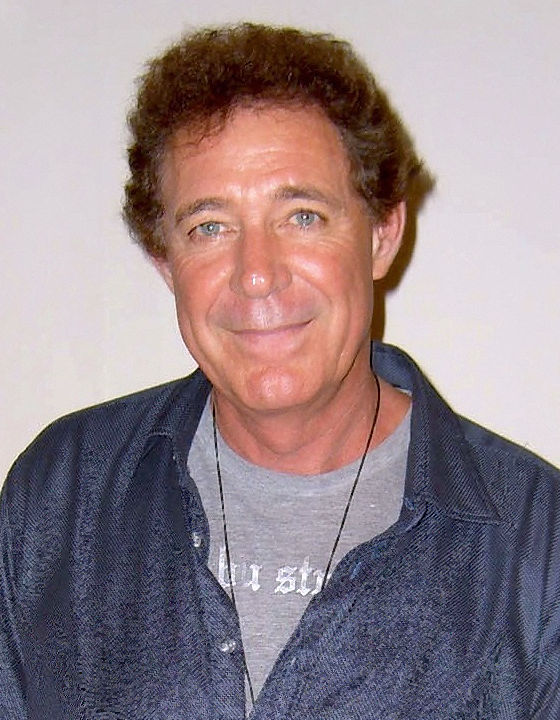
Barry Williams, who starred in The Brady Bunch, made a cameo appearance in the song's music video

The music video for "The Barry Williams Show" was directed by Sean Penn and stars Christopher McDonald as the fictional television host. Barry Williams from The Brady Bunch makes a cameo in the video as one of the audience members. Penn had secured permission from Gabriel for Williams to appear in the music video. Williams received the phone call from Penn while promoting a karaoke tour for Malibu Rum.

Gabriel had interacted with Penn on a few occasions and was impressed with some of the films he had directed, particularly The Crossing Guard. When determining a suitable director that aligned with the "dark and edgy" subject matter of "The Barry Williams Show", Gabriel selected Penn, who was also a fan of Gabriel's music. Penn recalled that he was "really flattered" when Gabriel asked him to create a music video for "The Barry Williams Show". He took creative inspiration from the song and various magical realist novels that he had read, particularly the work of Gabriel García Márquez. Gabriel had relatively little creative input on the direction of the music video and instead delegated most of the decision making to Penn. One of the scenes features blood gushing from the stage set.

On 6 September 2002, the music video premiered on AOL; it was launched on Netscape the following day. The video was aired on VH1 and was the 28th most played video played on the network for the week ending 6 October 2002. In the UK, the music video was barred from being aired before 9 p.m; broadcasters in other countries only aired the video at night due to its "sex-and-violence angle". Gabriel found this ban to be "surprising, given what else is shown to kids." In a 2007 interview with Record Collector, Gabriel expressed mixed feelings about the finished product: He was complimentary of the music video's creative concepts and storyboarding but felt that the music video lacked the emotion he desired.

== Live performances ==
Gabriel performed "The Barry Williams Show" on his 2002–2003 Growing Up Tour. During these performances, Gabriel took on the role of the song's talk show host and would preface the song by telling the audience, "Some people say, you are what you eat. I say – you are what you watch – and you watch The Barry Williams Show". Gabriel was equipped with a camera on this song, which he directed at members of his touring band and the audience. These images, which were also captured by a stagehand, were then projected onto a white fabric positioned in the center of the stage.

Gabriel's camera was attached to a dolly, which was connected to a scaffolding that descended to the ground from a large egg-shaped fixture. A fabric was displayed from the lighting rig, which pierced through the second stage. The scaffolding supported a platform, which Gabriel performed on as he moved the camera around the stage's perimeter. Members of the stage crew acted as the television floor staff during these performances. A nine minute version of the song, taken from a May 2003 live performance at the Fila Forum in Milan, was included on both the video and audio versions of Growing Up: Live.

== Critical reception ==
"The Barry Williams Show" was panned by reviewers. Stephen Thomas Erlewine of AllMusic felt that "The Barry Williams Show" was out of place on Up and characterized the song as "ham-fisted" and "wrong-headed". Scott Schinder of Entertainment Weekly thought that the song was a "muddled stab at social criticism". Chris Nickson of CMJ magazine dismissed "The Barry Williams Show' as a throwaway single. Writing for PopMatters, Andy Kerman identified "The Barry Williams Show" as the only "embarrassment" on Up and believed that it reflected poor judgment to release the song as the album's lead single. He further commented that the song portrays a "yesterday's-news portrait of an unscrupulous daytime talk show host, with quaintly old-fashioned synth horns and a big goofy chorus that tries to be rousing but only succeeds in being vapid." Chris Ott of Pitchfork said that the song "is both more egregious and revolting than his last album's uncomfortably obvious single, 'Kiss That Frog'."

Alexis Petridis of The Guardian believed that the song's lyrics and music sounded outdated, saying that it was "hardly cutting-edge satire" to ridicule Jerry Springer. He also dismissed the song's "Nine Inch Nails-influenced squalls" as unoriginal. Peter Menocal of Kludge lambasted the song as "nothing short of a joke with its failed attempt to fuse funk and satire. It's a travel back to a time in music we should never try to get stuck in or revive in any sense of the word." Andy Greene of Rolling Stone called "The Barry Williams Show" the worst song on Up "and quite possibly the worst song he's ever released going all the way back to the earliest days of Genesis in 1967."

Some publications were more positive on "The Barry Williams Show". In his album review of Up, David Lynch of The Austin Chronicle said that the song both "poppy" and "accessible". Writing for Salon, Jonathan Kiefer thought that Gabriel portrayed the titular talkshow host as an "endearingly contemptible tabloid TV sleaze-monger" and found the song to be "bitterly funny and certainly on target." Writing for Record Journal, Allan Sculley thought that the "Barry Williams Show" was a "chunky tune with its share of ear-grabbing moments". Larry Flick of Billboard described the song as an "acerbic take on the current spate of reality TV programs and their eroding effect on humanity."

== Track listing ==
7-inch single (2002)

1. "The Barry Williams Show" (Unadulterated Radio Edit) – 4:44
2. "Cloudless" (Radio Edit) – 4:08

CD (2002)

1. "The Barry Williams Show" (Unadulterated Radio Edit) – 4:44
2. "The Barry Williams Show" (Album Version) – 7:18
3. "My Head Sounds Like That" (Remix By Röyksopp) – 8:22
4. "Cloudless" (Radio Edit) – 4:08

== Personnel ==
Credits from the Up liner notes.

- Peter Gabriel – vocals, organ, Mellotron, bass keys, sampled strings, MPC groove, electronics, Telecaster, harmonica
- Tony Levin – bass guitar
- David Rhodes – guitar, backing vocals
- Tony Berg – backwards guitar
- Manu Katché – drums
- Ged Lynch – drums, percussion
- Richard Chappell – treated loop, programming
- Tchad Blake – groove treatment effects
- Christian Le Chevretel – trumpet
- Sally Larkin – backing vocals

== Charts ==
=== Weekly charts ===
Chart performance for "The Barry Williams Show"
Chart (2002)	Peak position
Europe (Eurochart Hot 100)	91
France (SNEP)	74
Germany (GfK)	66
Hungary (Single Top 40)	19
Italy (FIMI)	10
Switzerland (Schweizer Hitparade)	81
US Adult Alternative Airplay (Billboard)	9

=== Year-end charts ===
Chart (2002)	Position
US Triple A (Radio & Records)	70

== Awards and nominations ==
Year	Nominee / work	Award	Result
2003	Grammy Award	Best Male Rock Vocal Performance	Nominated
