= Johnny Kalsi =

British Indian musician

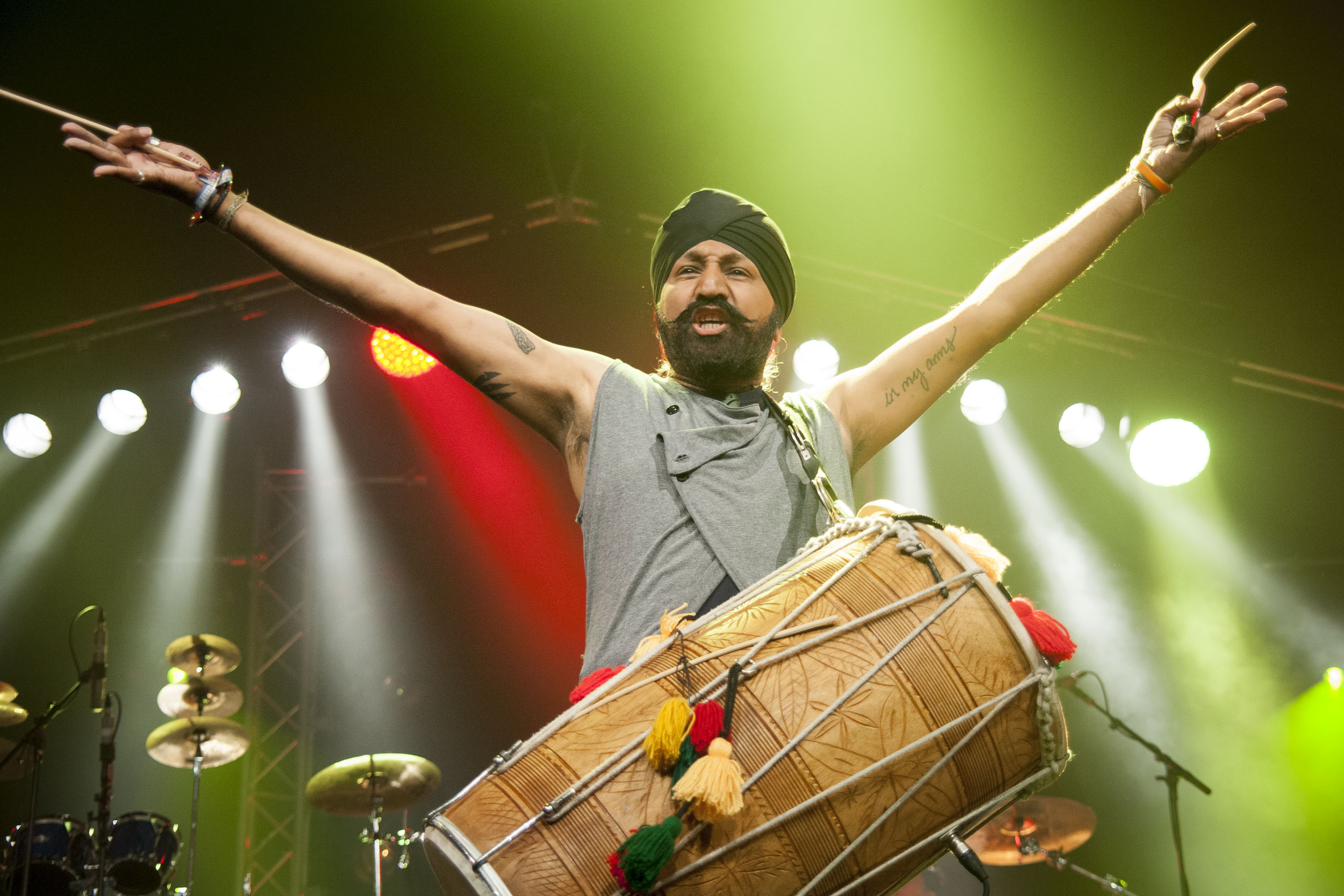

Background information
- Born: 1967 (age 58–59); Leeds, England
- Origin: India
- Genres: World music
- Occupations: Musician, songwriter, Producer
- Instruments: Vocals, Tabla, Dhol, percussion
- Years active: 1986 - present
- Labels: Shakti Records, Real World
- Website: www.dholfoundation.com

Johnny Kalsi is a British Indian dhol drum performer residing in London. He rose to prominence as a former member of Transglobal Underground and the founder of the Dhol Foundation. He also is a member of the Afro Celt Sound System and The Imagined Village.

== Biography ==
=== Early life ===
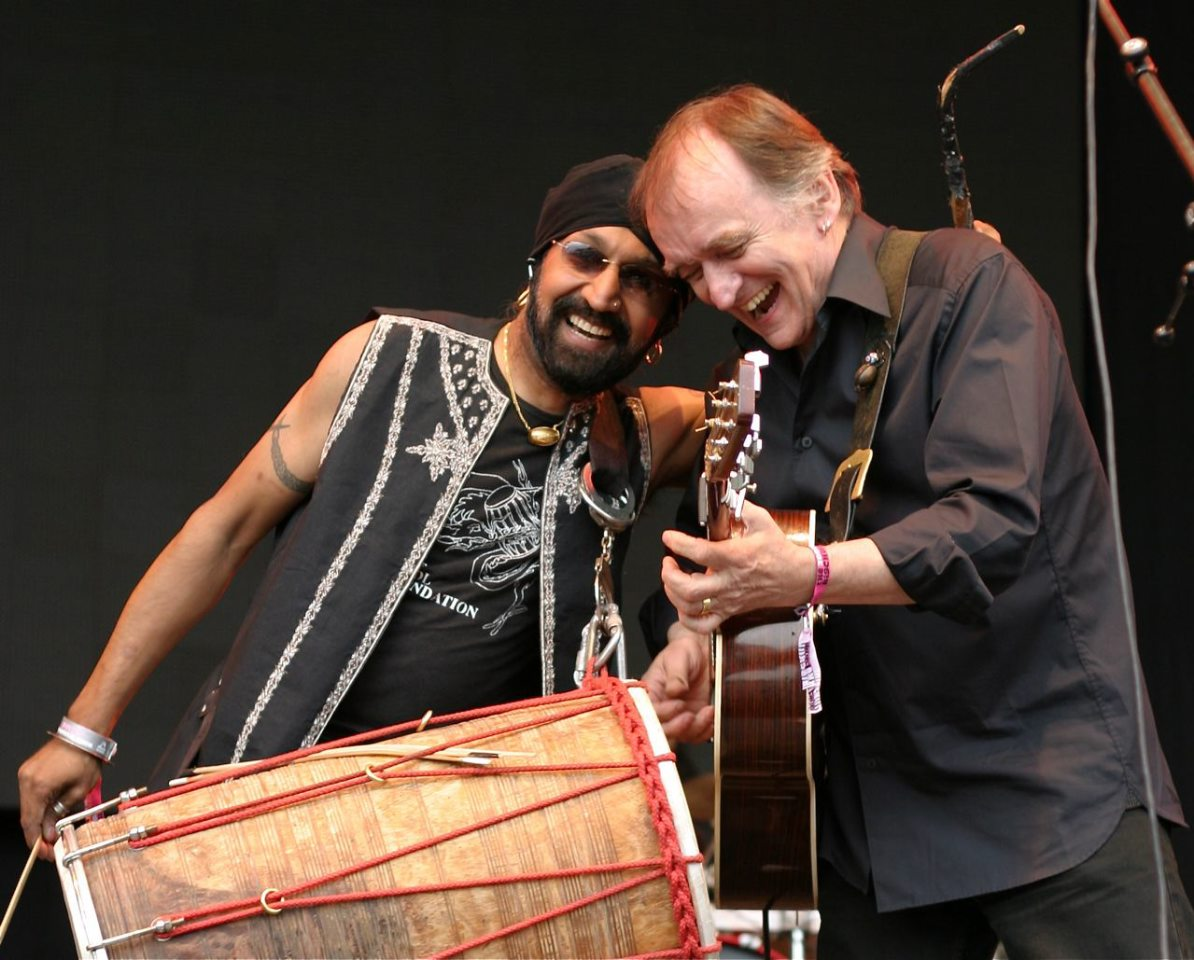
Kalsi and Martin Carthy performing with The Imagined Village at the Big Chill Festival

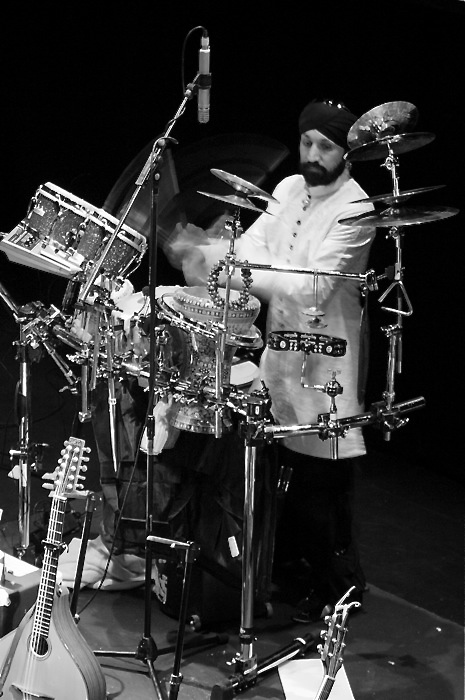
Kalsi performing with The Imagined Village in 2008

Kalsi was born in Leeds, Yorkshire in 1967. His parents had emigrated to the United Kingdom from Kenya. His grandfather had earlier moved to Mombasa from Punjab. As a youth, he was interested in music, though his parents had other aspirations for him, hoping he would become a doctor or lawyer. Kalsi was self-taught as a drummer when he joined a school jazz trio and they performed at school concerts and assembly hall meetings. He was also the drummer in the orchestra as well as in a rock band in school. His exposure to a variety of genres embraced both traditional Indian music and Western influences, and he began making Eastern drum rhythms using Western instruments; along the way he redesigned the traditional dhol drum to his own specifications.

=== Early career ===
In 1986, after leaving school and while in college, Kalsi joined a band called Mela Group for a few years and on the side he was also a session player for Wanjara Group & DJ Harvey. In 1989, he joined bhangra band Alaap, and assumed the role of lead percussionist and dhol player for the band. In 1995, Kalsi joined an emerging world music organisation founded by Peter Gabriel, based at Real World Studios in Box, Wiltshire, England.

He performed at a number of World of Music, Arts and Dance (WOMAD) festivals around the world. While performing at ceremonial weddings, Kalsi was encouraged to teach his techniques to others. He became the first dhol player to perform live with DJs, which appealed to younger audiences.

Kalsi's first dhol classes in Britain took place in 1989. No one had previously taught dhol as an ensemble instrument. Kalsi self funded his first tutorial classes in Slough, England in 1990. During 1991 he assembled lead drummers to perform in local charity events.

Kalsi took on the role of a sideman in addition to session work, and performed with the Afro Celt Sound System on their second album, Release, which also featured Sinéad O'Connor. During the time he was with Transglobal underground Kalsi and The Dhol Foundation provided support in a European tour with rock musicians Page & Plant.

Kalsi worked as a session musician for Fundamental and Transglobal Underground during the early 1990s, and later joined the Afro Celt Sound System. During 1997, Kalsi was touring with Fundamental performing at WOMAD festivals all over the world.

=== Later career ===
In 1999 Kalsi's drumming troupe, The Dhol Foundation recorded their first album. The album was recorded live at performances around the world, absorbing the differing musical influences of bands they toured with, and contributed to their sound. Big Drum Small World, featuring a large photo of Kalsi on the album cover, was released on Shakti Records in 2001. The album received positive mention from critics. Kalsi drew upon his experience as a session player and his understanding of ethnic and western instruments to work as producer for the album.

Peter Gabriel's label, Real World Records, recorded Kalsi's first album in 2002. Martin Scorsese's movie, Gangs of New York featured one of his songs, as did The Incredible Hulk. As a member of the Dhol Foundation and in a solo capacity, he also worked on Gabriel's albums Up and OVO, and his soundtrack for the album Rabbit Proof Fence.

Towards the end of 2002 Kalsi worked with the teenage pop singer Avril Lavigne, when she recorded a cover of Bob Dylan's "Knockin' on Heaven's Door". It was sung by Lavigne at a War Child Charity Concert covered by MTV. Kalsi was selected to give the track an ethnic Indian feel and add some light percussion. In early 2013 Johnny Kalsi took The Dhol Foundation to perform for Stand up To Cancer. Johnny is a member of the Sikh Welfare Awareness Team (SWAT) and each week he donates some of his time to feeding and clothing over 300 homeless people each week and also people living below the poverty line in central London.

In July 2013, Kalsi was commissioned to curate a piece of music for HRH HM Queens' Coronation Gala Concert Festival, an event for Royal Crest Holders. That September, Johnny Kalsi & The Dhol Foundation performed for the Formula 1 Music festival in Singapore, performing on the same stage as Sir Tom Jones.

Kalsi received an Honorary Fellowship Degree from Leeds College of Music in 2015.

Just ahead of the release of the 5th album, Basant, in 2016, Johnny Kalsi took The Dhol Foundation to USA for their debut tour.

In 2018, Kalsi was requested to open for a special concert for HRH HM Queens' 92nd Birthday. This was also a collaboration track with Sir Tom Jones, who sang "It's Not Unusual" to Dhol drums. In June that year, Kaldi performed with Angelique Kidjo on stage in London.

In 2019, Johnny Kalsi & The Dhol Foundation performed the opening for the Royal Commonwealth Service at Westminster Abbey in front of HRH HM Queen & the Royal Family.

In 2021, Kalsi once again led six of The Dhol Foundation elite to lead in the Commonwealth flag together with ACM Gospel Choir at Westminster Abbey in London for Commonwealth Observance Day.

== Discography (selected) ==
- Big Drum Small World (2001)
- Drum-Believable (2004)
- Drums 'n' Roses (2007)
- DrumStruck (2011)
- Basant (2017)
