= Loop (music) =

Repeating section of sound material in electroacoustic music

"Home Base Groove"
Loop example (recurring after 22 seconds) by Kevin MacLeod

In music, a loop is a repeating section of sound material. Short sections, such as one or two bars of music can be repeated to create ostinato patterns. Longer sections can also be repeated: for example, a player might loop what they play on an entire verse of a song in order to then play along with it, accompanying themselves.

Loops can be created using a wide range of music technologies including turntables, digital samplers, looper pedals, synthesizers, sequencers, drum machines, tape machines, and delay units, and they can be programmed using computer music software. The feature to loop a section of an audio track or video footage is also referred to by electronics vendors as A–B repeat.

Royalty-free loops can be purchased and downloaded for music creation from companies like The Loop Loft, Native Instruments, Splice and Output.

Loops are supplied in either MIDI or Audio file formats such as WAV, REX2, AIFF and MP3. Musicians play loops by triggering the start of the musical sequence by using a MIDI controller such as an Ableton Push or a Native Instruments MASCHINE.

== Definitions ==
- "Loops are short sections of tracks (probably between one and four bars in length), which you believe might work being repeated." A loop is not "any sample, but ... specifically a small section of sound that's repeated continuously." Contrast with a one-shot sample.
- "A loop is a sample of a performance that has been edited to repeat seamlessly when the audio file is played end to end."
- "A drum loop is technically a short recording of multiple drum materials which has been edited to loop seamlessly ( to loop smoothly and continuously), a drum loop repeats until an exact duration is satisfied, for example, to break a single loop to another, you might want to use a drum fill which could also be a seamless loop."

== Origins ==
While repetition is used in the music of all cultures, the first musicians to use loops in the sense meant by this article were musique concrete and electroacoustic music pioneers of the 1940s, such as Pierre Schaeffer, Halim El-Dabh, Pierre Henry, Edgard Varèse and Karlheinz Stockhausen. These composers used tape loops on reel-to-reel machines, manipulating pre-recorded sounds to make new works. In turn, El-Dabh's music influenced Frank Zappa's use of tape loops in the mid-1960s.

Terry Riley is a seminal composer and performer of the loop- and ostinato-based music who began using tape loops in 1960. For his 1963 piece Music for The Gift he devised a hardware looper that he named the Time Lag Accumulator, consisting of two tape recorders linked together, which he used to loop and manipulate trumpet player Chet Baker and his band. His 1964 composition In C, an early example of what would later be called minimalism, consists of 53 repeated melodic phrases (loops) performed live by an ensemble. "Poppy Nogood and the Phantom Band", the B-side of his influential 1969 album A Rainbow in Curved Air uses tape loops of his electric organ and soprano saxophone to create electronic music that contains surprises as well as hypnotic repetition.

Another effective use of tape loops was Jamaican dub music in the 1960s. Dub producer King Tubby used tape loops in his productions while improvising with homemade delay units. Another dub producer, Sylvan Morris, developed a slapback echo effect by using both mechanical and handmade tape loops. These techniques were later adopted by hip-hopians in the 1970s. Grandmaster Flash's turntablism is an early example in hip-hop.

The first commercial drum loop was created for the song "Stayin' Alive" for the movie Saturday Night Fever by Albhy Galuten and Karl Richardson. It was created by recording two measures of drums from the song “Night Fever” and recording them onto a two-track analog tape which was then fed between the capstan and the pinch roller. Because the loop was about 30 feet long, it was fed out to a 7” plastic reel for ballast which was hung over the arm of a microphone stand before the loop of tape returned to the take-up reel. This same loop was later used by the Bee Gees for the song "More than a Woman" also from the Saturday Night Fever soundtrack. That same loop was also use – though slowed down quite a bit, for the Streisand recording of “Woman in Love” produced by Albhy Galuten, Karl Richardson and Barry Gibb. When Jeff Porcaro of the band TOTO came to work with Galuten and Gibb on a Bee Gees record, he was shown the technique of creating drum loops with analog tape. Porcaro subsequently went back to California where he used the method he had learned to create the drum loop that was used by Toto as the foundation of the song Africa.

The use of pre-recorded, digitally-sampled loops in popular music dates back to Japanese electronic music band Yellow Magic Orchestra, who released one of the first albums to feature mostly samples and loops, 1981's Technodelic. Their approach to sampling was a precursor to the contemporary approach of constructing music by cutting fragments of sounds and looping them using computer technology. The album was produced using Toshiba-EMI's LMD-649 digital PCM sampler, which engineer Kenji Murata custom-built for YMO.

== Digital looping ==
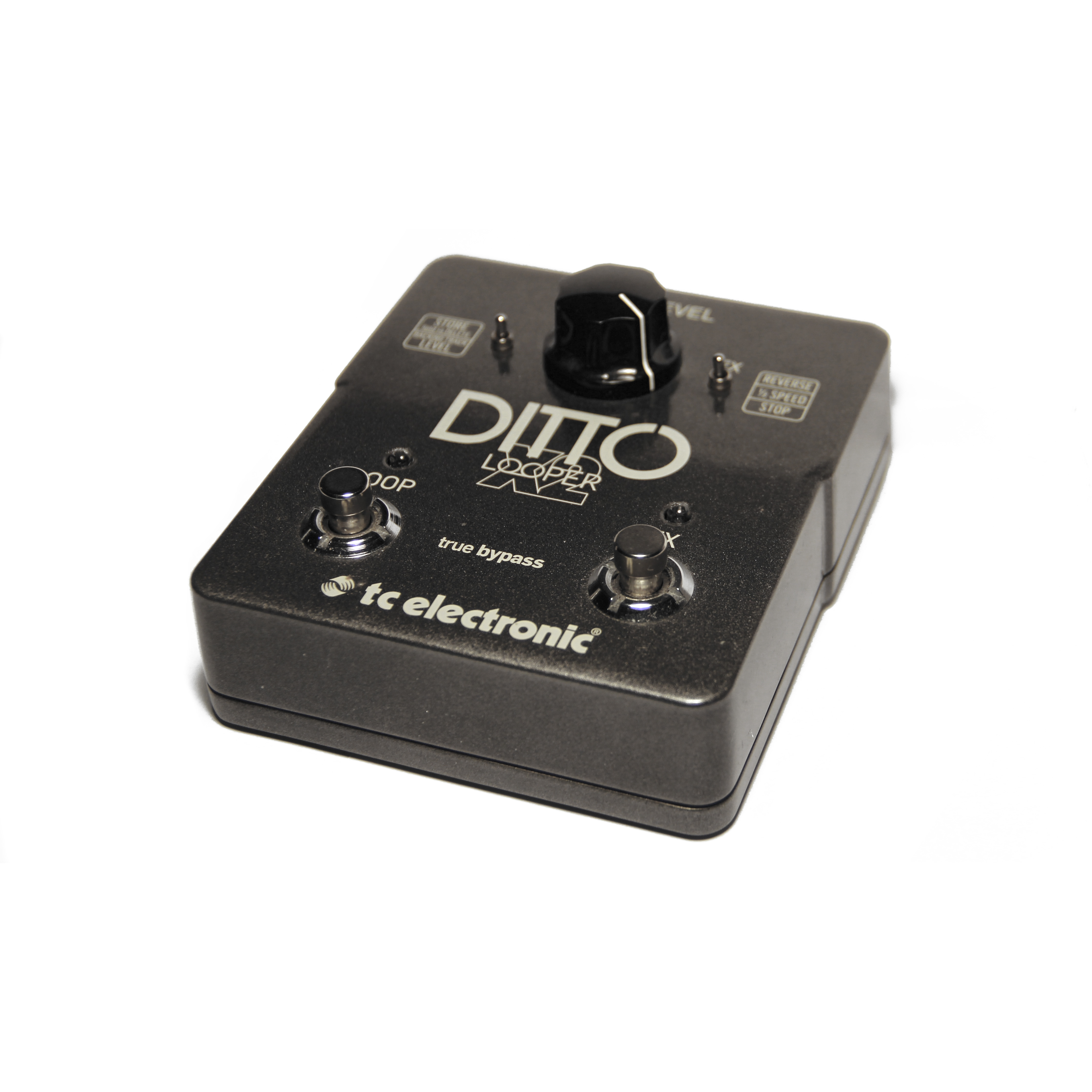
Ditto looper pedal

Since the 2010s, many musicians use digital hardware and software devices to create and modify loops, often in conjunction with various electronic musical effects. A loop can be created and triggered by a looper pedal, an effect pedal device that records the signal from a guitar or other audio source and then plays the recorded passage over and over again. A loop can be used by a one man band so that a single performer can have more musical accompaniment.

In the early 1990s, dedicated digital devices were invented specifically for use in live looping, i.e. loops that are recorded and created in front of a live audience. By late 1992, some units of Mathias Grob's LOOP Delay were sold (precursor to the Echoplex Digital Pro from Oberheim Electronics.

In February 1994, researchers at the IBM Research Center in Haifa, Israel, developed software to showcase technologies that could slow down or speed up sound segments looped in real-time without distorting the pitch while adding echo, reverb, feedback, frequency filters, and reverse audio effects. It was demonstrated in April 1994, with a dedicated song and tune played along with virtual instruments, at the Technion Israel Institute of Technology in Haifa, along with the software-controlled MWave modem and soundcard for the IBM Thinkpad laptop (later to become Lenovo). It was mainly used to slow down or speed up voice messages. Not realizing the potential for musicians, the technology was sold as an API to Sun Microsystems and incorporated in the Java language as part of the Telephony and Multimedia interfaces (JTAPI and JMMI).

Many hardware loopers exist, some in rack unit form, but primarily as effect pedals. The discontinued Lexicon JamMan, Gibson Echoplex Digital Pro, Electrix Repeater, and Looperlative LP1 are 19" rack units. The Boomerang "Rang III" Phrase Sampler, DigiTech JamMan, Boss RC-300 and the Electro-Harmonix 2880 are examples of popular pedals.

Modern looper-artists today also rely on specialised dedicated looping software: Everyday Looper, Loopy, Loopr Live Loop Composer are popular ones on iOS. They offer more creative options while providing ability to connect using the devices' cellular, bluetooth or wifi capabilities. They also offer connectivity to a very large range of audio and midi hardware that proprietary pedals don't usually offer.

The musical loop is one of the most important features of video game music. It is also the guiding principle behind devices like the several Chinese Buddhist music boxes that loop chanting of mantras, which in turn were the inspiration of the Buddha machine, an ambient-music generating device. The Jan Linton album "Buddha Machine Music" used these loops along with others created by manually scrolling through C.D.s on a CDJ player.

=== Loop-based music software ===
Digital audio workstation software can be used to create music using loops, commonly found in electronic dance music such as house and techno. Through audio time stretching and pitch scaling, multiple loops are aligned to create a track. Notable software includes Acid Pro with its "Acidized" loops feature and FL Studio.

== See also ==
- Phase music
- Gapless playback
