= DigiTech JamMan =

The DigiTech JamMan is a discontinued looper pedal formerly manufactured by DigiTech. It is unrelated to the earlier Lexicon JamMan unit. It can record up to 99 loops, perform real-time recording, and can hold up to 6½ hours of audio. It takes input from guitars and microphones. It has two foot switches, one for recording/overdub and one for stopping the loop. It also has preset rhythm tracks.
