= Millennium Dome Show =

2000 multimedia show in London, England

The Millennium Dome Show was a multimedia theatrical performance created to commemorate the year 2000 in the Millennium Dome in London, England.

Peter Gabriel composed the music, which was later made available as his eleventh studio album OVO. The show was performed in the middle of the Dome, opened on 1 January 2000 and was performed 999 times before its closing on 31 December of that year.

== The Story of OVO ==
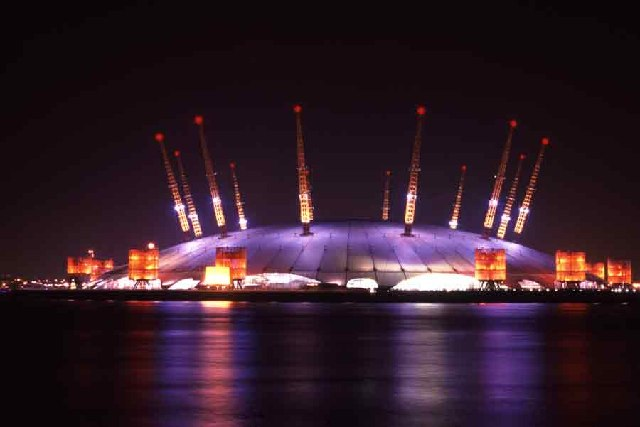
The Millennium Dome at night in September 2000

The Story of OVO was released in the CD-shaped comic book which was part of the CD edition of the studio album OVO with the title "OVO The Millennium Show".

The Romeo and Juliet-like story in the show, serving as an allegory for humanity's unity between nature and technology, revolved around a feud between the "earth-people" and the "sky-people". A young boy from the sky and a young girl from the earth fell in love, but the feud between their people made it difficult for them to meet. Eventually the earth-people suffered a crushing defeat, which ultimately led them to reconcile and unite with the sky-people. At the end of the show, the lovers flew together into a better future, symbolizing the beginning of the new millennium.

== Other performances ==
Tamsier Joof choreographed the segment titled: Our Town Story for East London (London Borough of Hackney) with Ujamaa Arts, supported by McDonald's.
