= Kludge (magazine) =

Online music magazine

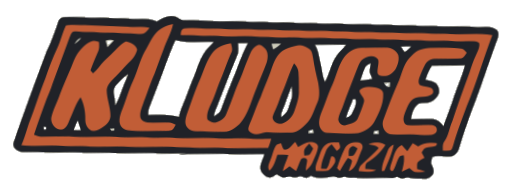
- Website type: Music webzine
- Available in: English
- Owner: Arturo Perez
- Creator: Arturo Perez
- Website: kludgemagazine.com/
- Launched: 2000
- Current status: Offline

Kludge was a Los Angeles-based online music magazine devoted to long-form music journalism, album reviews, music news and interviews. It included a media section and a discussion forum. Founded in 2000 by editor-in-chief Arturo Perez, the magazine developed a reputation for its extensive coverage of underground and independent music.

Kludge had a combined staff of over twenty writers, editors, graphic designers, and photographers. It included writers from various backgrounds, ranging from academics and professional journalists to first time writers. After its establishment, the site rapidly expanded to include live reviews, interviews, streams of albums, and year-end features. Kludge had frequently partnered with Virgin Megastores for presenting new works and promoting new artists.

While the site's readership numbers never reached the levels of Pitchfork Media's, it did receive many notices in the press for the quality of its writing. It has been quoted by publications such as the Oakland Tribune, Music Connection, and PureVolume, and has been used as a source by Artistdirect as well as a number of record labels, including Epitaph Records.

Kludge ceased publication in May 2006, but the website remained online until December 2009.
