= The Dhol Foundation =

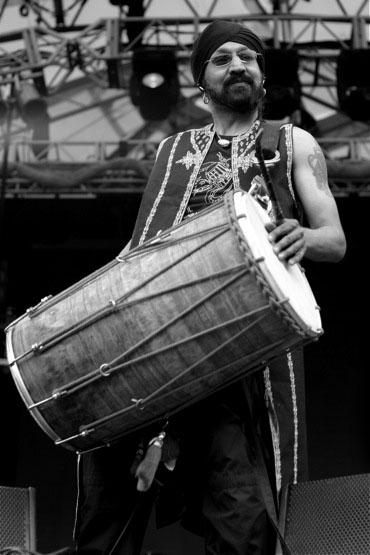
- TDF founder Johnny Kalsi

Background information
- Origin: London, Birmingham, England
- Genres: Bhangra, Ambient Music
- Years active: 1989–present
- Labels: Shakti Records

The Dhol Foundation is both a dhol drum institute in London, and a musical group. The dhol school was founded in 1989 by former Alaap member Johnny Kalsi when several musicians asked him to be their teacher, and a first album was released by Kalsi and his students in 2001.

Dhol drums are a traditional percussion instrument from the Punjab province in the north of India, from which Kalsi originates. In London he experimented with dance beats and electronic music, which he mixes with the traditional bhangra style in his albums.

Their music has been featured in Hollywood films such as Gangs of New York and The Incredible Hulk, and have worked with Peter Gabriel on the soundtrack to the film Rabbit-Proof Fence. They opened the Commonwealth Games in Melbourne in 2006.

TDF have performed at WOMAD many times. Although officially released in 2005, 200 pre-release 'festival edition' copies of the album Drum-Believable were available to those who attended Womad Reading in 2004. These are now a rarity.

== Discography ==
- 2001: Big Drum Small World
- 2005: Drum-Believable
- 2007: Drums 'n' Roses
- 2010: Drum Struck
- 2017: Basant

== See also ==
- The Bollywood Brass Band
- Afro Celt Sound System
- Asian Dub Foundation
- Transglobal Underground
- Peter Gabriel
