= Lexicon JamMan =

Audio looping device

The JamMan is an audio looping device manufactured by Lexicon in the mid-1990s. The idea for the JamMan began with modifications Gary Hall had devised for the Lexicon PCM-42 that allowed him to play into a long, looping delay whose clock could be synchronized to an external source. (Hall, who worked for Lexicon in two different periods, was the primary architect of the PCM41 and PCM42, as well as the non-reverberation effects that first appeared in the 224X and became better known in the PCM70.) Bob Sellon extended the concept considerably, starting with elaborate PCM42 modifications and eventually working with several others at Lexicon to arrive at the JamMan.

The product allowed musicians to record musical phrases at the touch of a button which were then played back, looping indefinitely. The musician would typically use the looping audio as a backing track providing a virtual backing band. The device also allowed MIDI drum machines and sequencers to be synchronized to them providing additional accompaniment. By pressing a button on the floor pedal, the device begins recording a rhythm (8 seconds of memory comes standard, but an upgraded 32-second memory chip is a common upgrade). When the musician is finished playing the part to be looped, simply press the tap button on the floor again and the machine does two things immediately: replays the part from the beginning looping it indefinitely while sending a MIDI clock signal to a drum machine which kicks in right on time and is synchronized to the rhythm part.

The JamMan is a 1U rack mounted unit that is controlled using 1 or 2 footswitches or via MIDI.

== Users ==
- Daft Punk
- Peter Gabriel
- Brian Eno
- Junior Vasquez
- Joseph Arthur
- Chet Atkins
- David Torn
- Alessandro Batazzi
- Radio Chongqing
- Blixa Bargeld
- Boyd Rice
- Nick Robinson
- Keller Williams
- Phil Keaggy
- Tristan 'Z' Zand
- Jacob Moon
- Kelly Burnette
- Matthieu Chedid
- Michael Brecker
- Keith Marquis
- Nick McCabe

== See also ==
- DigiTech JamMan
