= Revisited (Peter Gabriel album) =

Compilation album by Peter Gabriel
- Released: 10 November 1992
- Recorded: 1976–1978
- Genre: Progressive rock
- Length: 62:03
- Label: Atlantic (US and Canada)
- Producer: Bob Ezrin; Robert Fripp

Peter Gabriel chronology
Us (1992)	Revisited (1992)	Secret World Live (1994)

Professional ratings
Review scores
Source	Rating
AllMusic	3/5 stars

Peter Gabriel Revisited is a compilation album by Peter Gabriel which includes selections from his first two albums, as Atlantic had retained the US distribution rights to Gabriel's first and second albums. It compiles 7 of 9 tracks from the first album, and 8 of 11 from the second. AllMusic, noting that the compilation ill-served both committed and casual Gabriel fans, labelled this album "good but useless".

== Track listing ==
All tracks are written by Peter Gabriel, except where noted.

No.	Title	Writer(s)	Length
1.	"On the Air"		5:28
2.	"Modern Love"		3:38
3.	"Indigo"		3:32
4.	"Solsbury Hill"		4:30
5.	"Perspective"		3:28
6.	"Waiting for the Big One"		7:14
7.	"Animal Magic"		3:29
8.	"Humdrum"		3:26
9.	"D.I.Y."		2:38
10.	"Mother of Violence"	Gabriel, Jill Gabriel	3:21
11.	"Slowburn"		4:36
12.	"Exposure"	Gabriel, Robert Fripp	4:17
13.	"Moribund the Burgermeister"		4:17
14.	"Flotsam and Jetsam"		2:22
15.	"Here Comes the Flood"		5:54
Total length:			62:03

== Personnel ==
- Peter Gabriel – synthesizer, flute, piano, keyboards, recorder, vocals, background vocals
- Bayete – keyboards
- Roy Bittan – keyboards
- Josef Chirowski – synthesizer, percussion, keyboards
- Larry Fast – synthesizer
- Robert Fripp – banjo, electric guitar, producer, classical guitar, frippertronics
- Dick Wagner – guitar, background vocals
- Steve Hunter – guitar, pedal steel, rhythm guitar
- Sid McGinnis – acoustic guitar, mandolin, electric guitar, steel guitar, background vocals
- Tony Levin – bass, tuba, arranger, background vocals, chapman stick, recorder arrangement
- George Marge – recorder
- Jerry Marotta – drums, background vocals
- Allan Schwartzberg – drums
- Tim Capello – saxophone

=== Credits ===
- Val Azzoli – executive producer
- Tom Bouman – art direction, design
- Bob Ezrin – producer
- Stephen Innocenzi – remastering
- Ron Jaramillo – design
- Bob Kaus – compilation
- Michael Mazzarella – research coordination
