= On the Air (song) =

Song by Peter Gabriel

from the album Peter Gabriel
- Released: 1978
- Length: 5:30
- Label: Charisma
- Songwriter: Peter Gabriel
- Producer: Robert Fripp

"On the Air" is a song written and recorded by English musician Peter Gabriel. The song first premiered on Gabriel's first solo tour in 1977 and was later included as the opening track on his 1978 solo album Peter Gabriel. For certain performances on the album's accompanying tour, the song served as the set opener, although it occasionally followed a solo rendition of "Me and My Teddy Bear", thus repositioning it to the second song of the set.

== Background ==
Gabriel wrote "On the Air" about a fictional character named Mozo, a derelict alienated by the world around him. In the song, Mozo attempts to attain fame through the medium of shortwave radio by concocting an alter-ego that closely aligns with his aspirations.

There is a story here concerning this character Mozo who is mentioned. At this point, he's an outsider and he lives in a hollow in a dump on the outside of an anonymous town and he lives out his fantasies on the radio. Through shortwave he becomes whoever he wants, but on the street, he's totally ignored.

Gabriel attributed part of Mozo's creation to a childhood memory of a dilapidated caravan in Horsell Common, which he used to think was occupied by a witch. In July 1978, Gabriel considered the idea of expanding the story of Mozo with Radúz Činčera and later worked with Stuart Kranz in 1979 to develop ideas for the story. By 1987, Gabriel expressed interest in transforming the Mozo story into a movie, but none of these projects ever came to fruition. Gabriel instead scattered songs related to Mozo across his studio albums beginning with his 1977 debut album and ending with So in 1986, with "Red Rain" and "That Voice Again" being the final songs to center around the character up until 2026, when "One by One" was released. He intended for these songs to exist as part of an overarching story surrounding Mozo, with "On the Air" representing the fantasy world that Mozo occupies. Another song on Gabriel's 1978 eponymous album, "Exposure", was also included within the Mozo story, although "On the Air" was the first time the character was explicitly mentioned in the lyrics.

== Recording ==
"On the Air" was first recorded in 1976 for Gabriel's debut album. Larry Fast had developed a synth pattern during these sessions with an Oberheim digital sequencer, which was used to drive some Moog patches. At certain points of the song, Fast fed the sequence through a Mu-Tron BiPhase deep stereo phaser. Fast had been working on a similar sequence for his band Synergy and felt that the sequence would work well with "On the Air". Rather than the 4/4 time signature found on the 1978 recording, the original version was set in 6/8 time. Fast later expressed his preference for the original recording despite it being left unfinished.

In a 1980 interview with Smash Hits, Gabriel expressed his opinion that "On the Air" was one of the few songs on the album that received sufficient attention in the recording studio, particularly in regards to the synthesizer arrangement.

== Live performances ==
Gabriel debuted "On the Air" during his first tour in the United States prior to the release of his second eponymous album as the second song of the set. It then appeared during the European leg of the tour and was placed later in the setlist after "Down the Dolce Vita". The synthesiser parts for these performances were played by Bayete.

During Gabriel's tour promoting his 1978 eponymous release, he and his band members navigated through the aisles donning fluorescent orange construction vests and searchlights that they shined into the crowd while Larry Fast's "Disruption in World Communication" instrumental composition played through the loudspeakers. Upon reaching the stage, the band turned their backs to their audience before playing the first chords of "On the Air." Fast, who played synthesisers on this tour, developed some of the sequencing at home on his Apple computer and transferred the data onto cassettes and ROMS. He constructed a case for his single-board machine, which he used to access the coded information specifically developed for the song.

"On the Air" did not appear on the abridged version of Gabriel's 1983 Plays Live album, although it was one of the four additional songs included on the 2-disc version of the live album. Peter Walsh, who was tasked with editing and compiling the material for the Plays Live album, said that the synthesisers were reworked for "On the Air" so that the sequenced parts could be placed in stereophonic sound. The original live recording was recorded in monaural sound, so Fast submitted a cassette containing the updated audio and timestamps via mail. Walsh then synchronised Fast's parts with the original track and fed the audio through a PA system in a barn to simulate a live sound.

== Critical reception ==
Along with "D.I.Y.", Stephen Thomas Erlewine described "On the Air" as "stunning slices of modern rock circa 1978, bubbling with synths, insistent rhythms, and polished processed guitars, all enclosed in a streamlined production that nevertheless sounds as large as a stadium." The Chicago Sun-Times also identified these songs as the only two highlights on the album. Dave Marsh of Rolling Stone was complimentary of "On the Air", labeling it as a "good rock number". Ultimate Classic Rock placed particular attention on Fripp's production choices, specifically the delay applied to Gabriel's vocals. The Rolling Stone Album Guide thought that the song's "Who-style pomp" demonstrated Gabriel's reluctance at the time to shed his progressive rock inclinations.

== Personnel ==
- Peter Gabriel – lead and backing vocals
- Robert Fripp – electric guitar
- Sid McGinnis – electric guitar
- Tony Levin – bass guitar, backing vocals
- Roy Bittan – keyboards
- Larry Fast – synthesizers, treatments
- Jerry Marotta – drums, backing vocals
