= Moribund the Burgermeister =

Song by Peter Gabriel

from the album Peter Gabriel
- A-side: "Solsbury Hill"
- Released: 1977
- Recorded: 1976
- Genre: Progressive rock
- Length: 4:20
- Label: Atco; Charisma
- Songwriter: Peter Gabriel
- Producer: Bob Ezrin

"Moribund the Burgermeister" is a song written and recorded by English musician Peter Gabriel. It is the opening song on his debut album, titled Peter Gabriel and was also issued as the B-side to "Solsbury Hill", the first single released from the album. Gabriel also performed the song on several of his early concert tours as a solo artist beginning in 1977. The song's lyrics relate to a nervous disorder that plagues a medieval village.

== Composition ==
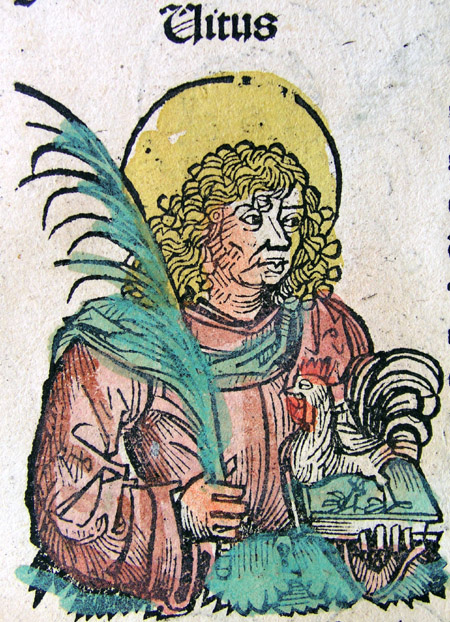
Saint Vitus, the namesake of a medieval dancing mania known Vitus' Dance

Gabriel wrote "Moribund the Burgermeister" about St. Vitus' Dance, a disease that afflicted its victims with forcible and uncontrollable jerking movements or dancing. He had read about St. Vitus' Dance in a book discussing medieval diseases. The namesake for St. Vitus' Dance, Saint Vitus, was a medieval patron saint of actors, dancers, and epilepsy. Saint Vitus' followers would perform manic dances during his feast day to cure individuals of the disease. Modern medicine generally identifies St. Vitus' Dance either as a kind of dancing mania (itself having various possible causes), or as the autoimmune illness Sydenham's chorea.

During the song, Gabriel employs multiple voices to adopt the roles of various characters, one of which is the titular "Moribund the Burgermeister". A burgermeister refers to a European town official that has similar responsibilities to a mayor and the word moribund carries a definition relating to declining health. The Burgermeister is represented in the song as a clueless authority figure who blames the source of the Vitus' Dance on external forces he is unable to understand; he eventually suggests in verse three that the mania is "the work of the devil". He offers up various suggestions on how to remedy the problem, including the use of potions, stricter policing of the city, and "waxen dolls", which prove to be futile. Gabriel delivered the lines of the Burgermeister in a throaty voice, including the "I will find out" lyric that caps off the second and third chorus. Some of Gabriel's vocals were processed with a harmoniser, with the vocal effects being featured prominently on the second chorus.

The song's working title was "I Will Find Out" during the recording sessions of Gabriel's first solo album. Gabriel's lead vocals were amongst the final things added to the song. For the tracking session, Gabriel sang a guide vocal using a technique he dubbed "Gabrielese", where he substituted actual words with syllables as placeholders. The verses of the song consist of descending synthesiser chords and electronically manipulated percussion. Larry Fast played his parts on a Polymoog, Minimoog, and a Moog modular system. He recorded the synth response line to the "I will find out" lyric as an overdub.

The song's percussion was played by Jimmy Maelen on a talking drum. Fast captured the sound of the talking drum with a contact microphone and fed the signal through an envelope triggered through his modular synthesiser rack. Fast mixed the dry signal of the talking drum with the processed drum sound, which was treated with electronic oscillators, Moog filters, and delay to create what he described as a "percussive sound bed." He said that the Moog filters were responsible for the "fluid swirly drum sound".

Lyrically, the first verse details the mayhem unfurling in the market square, where the townsfolk are "twistin' and turnin' in a thousand ways". The song then transitions into the chorus, which features fuller instrumentation of drums, bass, electric guitars, and synthesisers. Each of the choruses are straddled with a different set of lyrics that follow the same melodic motif.

== Critical reception ==
Prior to the song's release on Gabriel's 1977 self-titled album, Allan Jones of Melody Maker praised Gabriel's "bitter humour and clever writing" on "Moribund the Burgermeister". He also described the song as a "disconcerting little affair, which projects a series of Bosch-like images of suffering and horror with an electroshock vocal arrangement." Writing for New Musical Express, Patrick Humphries singled out "Moribund the Burgermeister" as the best song on the album. He placed attention on Gabriel's "extraordinary" vocal delivery and the synthesised percussion, which he called "beautiful", and also found that the song struck "a happy balance between grandeur and orthodoxy."

In his review for Rolling Stone Stephen Demorest noted the song's "playful synthesizer doodles, trollish vocals and orchestral outbursts." Writing for the Winnipeg Free Press, Andy Mellen said that "Moribund the Burgermeister" was "the closest he comes to his former band". He described it as "one of [Gabriel's] patented story-songs filled with unique characterisations and offbeat lyrics." Janet Macoska wrote in the Trouser Press that the song showcased "Gabriel's eclectic sense of theatrics" and said that his vocals sounded "straight out of The Twilight Zone."

Retrospective reviewers have discussed "Moribund the Burgermeister" in the context of Gabriel's work with Genesis. Daryl Easlea, a Peter Gabriel biographer, described "Moribund the Burgermeister" as the "most Genesis-esque" song on his first album. He compared sections of the song to "The Grand Parade of Lifeless Packaging" from The Lamb Lies Down on Broadway. Steve Hackett, who was a member of Genesis with Gabriel, said that "Moribund the Burgermeister" reminded him of their song "Get 'Em Out by Friday". Stephen Thomas Erlewine of AllMusic believed that "Moribund the Burgermeister" possessed a "bizarre" arrangement and unique production choices that marked a shift from the instrumental passages found on some of Gabriel's work with Genesis. Writing for Classic Rock, Mark Beaumont characterised the song as "an operatic vision of a medieval plague" that appealed to "prog heel-draggers". Jim DeRogatis of the Chicago Sun-Times identified the song as a bridge between his work with Genesis and the more "stripped-down but still dramatic approach" found on the rest of his first solo album.

== Live performances ==
Gabriel performed "Moribund the Burgermeister" as the third song of the set on his first solo tour. During these performances, Barbara Charone of Sounds magazine observed that Gabriel sang into a wireless microphone as he "strut[ted]" across the stage. Gabriel played the role of Moribund the Burgermeister by hunching his back and pulling the hood of his sweatshirt over his head at certain points of the song and performing a "slow-motion march". For the European leg of the tour, "Moribund the Burgermeister" was retained in the setlist, with Allan Jones of Melody Maker noting the song's use of "subtle electronic effects".

"Moribund the Burgermeister" was played again on Gabriel's Scratch Tour, which was in promotion of his 1978 self-titled album. Gabriel sang portions of the song for these performances "slithering belly-down" in front of Jerry Marotta's drum kit, with his movements being accentuated by a grid of flickering lights. He also played the song on his 1980 tour, which showcased songs from his third self-titled album. "Moribund the Burgermeister" was grouped together with "Mother of Violence" and "Humdrum" in the setlist, both of which were originally released on his first two solo albums. Gabriel later revived the song for his 2007 Warm Up Tour, where he allowed fans registered to his Full Moon Club to contribute suggestions to the setlist.

== Personnel ==
- Peter Gabriel – lead vocals, keyboards
- Robert Fripp – electric guitar
- Steve Hunter – electric guitar
- Tony Levin – bass guitar
- Jozef Chirowski – keyboards
- Larry Fast – synthesizers, programming
- Allan Schwartzberg – drums
- Jimmy Maelen – talking drum
