= Humdrum (song) =

Song by Peter Gabriel

from the album Peter Gabriel
- Released: 1977
- Recorded: 1976
- Studio: The Soundstage, Toronto, Canada
- Genre: Art rock; progressive rock
- Length: 3:25
- Label: Charisma
- Songwriter: Peter Gabriel
- Producer: Bob Ezrin

"Humdrum" is a song written and recorded by English musician Peter Gabriel, included as the fifth track on his debut solo album, Peter Gabriel. Recorded as a multi-movement song, "Humdrum" was performed live on several of Gabriel's first few tours as a solo artist, with a recording from one performance appearing on his 1983 live album, Plays Live.

== Background ==
In an interview with Tony Smith of New Musical Express, Gabriel discussed his approach to writing lyrics, specifically for "Humdrum", saying "I just write down images that interest me. I've got an idea of what I'm trying to say, but there's one part in 'Humdrum' which I wasn't clear about. The words sounded nice when written down."

"Humdrum" is a multi-movement composition that begins with lyrics about a person at JFK Airport with chordal accompaniment from an electric piano. It then segues into a rumba instrumental interlude with percussion; this instrumentation continues into the next verse before transitioning into a coda with layered keyboards. The song's synth orchestration at the end of the song was overdubbed by Larry Fast after the other session musicians had departed from the recording studio, with some additional parts added during the tracking session when the rest of the band was present at Soundstage Studios in Toronto, where the majority of the song was recorded. Fast recorded his parts on a Moog modular synthesizer. The song also features a pump organ, which was recorded in the bathroom adjacent to the studio control room; cables were fed from the control room to the bathroom to record the instrument.

Commenting Gabriel's vocal delivery on "Humdrum", Bob Ezrin, who served as the producer of Gabriel's debut solo album, said that Gabriel "opened his mouth and it was like the voice of God. I burst into tears. It was among the most beautiful things I'd ever heard."

== Critical reception ==
Stephen Demorest of Rolling Stone noted the stylistic changes in "Humdrum", saying that it open[s] as a hypnotic ballad as hushed as a falling raindrop, then snap[s] into a Caribbean tempo." He also labelled Gabriel's lyrics on the song as "deft". Beat Instrumental called "Humdrum" the best song on the album along with "Solsbury Hill". In his review for Melody Maker, Allan Jones said that the song was representative of the mood found on side two of Gabriel's debut solo album. He also noted the song's "sudden shifts" that transition from "acoustic introspection to vivid Latin rhythms."

Writing for New Musical Express, Steve Clarke thought that the refrain found on the first part of the song was evocative of Bruce Springsteen's work. Andy Mellen of the Winnipeg Free Press compared some of the song's instrumentation to some of the material found on the album Foxtrot by Genesis. Anthony Phillips, who co-founded Genesis with Gabriel, highlighted the song in a column found in Melody Maker, where he praised the song as "absolutely amazing". Stephen Thomas Erlewine cited the song's lyric "you've got me cooking/I'm a hardboiled egg" as an example of Gabriel "stumbling occasionally" on his debut album. Writing for Rolling Stone, Ryan Reed characterised the song as a "giddy hodgepodge" of styles with "off-kilter" vocal phrasings.

== Live performances ==
Gabriel debuted "Humdrum" on his first tour as a solo artist in 1977. Reviewing Gabriel's March performance in New York, Barbara Charone wrote that the band's rendition of "Humdrum" "hasn't yet been perfected onstage but still creates tension." For Gabriel's live performance at the Hammersmith Odeon, Allan Jones of Melody Maker thought that the song was "enhanced by the sympathetic and pertinently atmospheric synthesiser statements of Larry Fast." Gabriel also performed the song on his tour promoting his 1978 self-titled album and his 1980 self-titled album.

"Humdrum" was one of the songs that Gabriel included on a vinyl that accompanied the second issue of The Bristol Recorder, a publication/record album that was issued three times from 1979 to 1981. The recording included on the 1981 edition of The Bristol Recorder was from a July 1980 performance at the Diplomat Hotel in New York City. A live recording of "Humdrum" taken from Gabriel's 1982 tour was included on his 1983 Plays Live album. The song resurfaced in 2007 for Gabriel's Warm Up Tour, which took place in Europe from June to August. For this tour, Gabriel assembled a setlist based on suggestions from fans who had posted song requests on his website.

== Personnel ==
- Peter Gabriel – lead vocals, keyboards
- Robert Fripp – guitar
- Steve Hunter – guitar
- Tony Levin – bass guitar
- Jozef Chirowski – keyboards
- Larry Fast – synthesizers
- Allan Schwartzberg – drums
- Jimmy Maelen – percussion
