= Indigo (Peter Gabriel song) =

Song by Peter Gabriel

from the album Peter Gabriel
- Released: 1978
- Recorded: November 1977 – February 1978
- Studio: Trident Studios, London
- Length: 3:30
- Label: Charisma
- Songwriter: Peter Gabriel
- Producer: Peter Gabriel

"Indigo" is a song written and recorded by English musician Peter Gabriel. Gabriel originally performed "Indigo" live on his first solo tour in 1977 without any lyrics before finishing and recording the song for his second solo album, Peter Gabriel, where it was included as the sixth track.

== Background ==
Discussing the song with Steve Clarke of New Musical Express, Gabriel commented that he planned on making "Indigo" about a "straight domestic situation of a father dying in a house". He felt that the song was "not particularly happy, but it's not pitying", adding that "it's like the feeling of taking a breath and stepping outside, whether it's like in 2001 where they step out of the spaceship or just out of your front door or – in this case – out of breath."

Gabriel was influenced by the song "Ol' Man River", saying that he recognized a "warmth in that song", which then fed into the writing of "Indigo". Gabriel had also played a recording of "Ol' Man River" at the end of his concerts while members of the audience were leaving the venue.

Musically, the song opens with Gabriel's vocals and an acoustic piano, with the second verse introducing recorder parts from George Marge. The keyboard playing on the song was shared between Roy Bittan and Todd Cochran, the latter of whom recorded their parts on an acoustic piano and an ARP 2600. Tony Levin, who played double bass on the song, also helped with the recorder arrangements.

== Live performances ==
Gabriel debuted "Indigo" on his 1977 tour, where he would introduce it as "A Song Without Words". Early renditions of the song featured Gabriel singing syllables through a harmoniser, a type of vocal processing unit. Reviewing one of his March 1977 performances in New York City, Barbara Charone said that the vocal effect resembled "an air balloon from the theatre of the absurd". Steve Clarke of New Musical Express reviewed the same show, saying that the song had a "lovely melody" and that "the adoring audience loved it."

By September 1977, Gabriel was performing the song with full lyrics. During this leg of the tour, Levin would preface "Indigo" by calling it the best song Gabriel ever wrote. Gabriel also performed the song on his 2007 Warm Up Tour, where the setlist consisted of rarely performed songs that were suggested by fan request through his website.

== Personnel ==
- Peter Gabriel – vocals
- Sid McGinnis – pedal steel guitar
- Tony Levin – double bass, recorder arrangements
- Todd Cochran – keyboards
- Roy Bittan – keyboards
- Jerry Marotta – drums
- George Marge – recorder
