= D.I.Y. (song) =

- Original 1978 UK vinyl single

Single by Peter Gabriel

from the album Peter Gabriel (Scratch)
- B-side: "Perspective"
- Released: 12 May 1978
- Studio: Relight Studios, Hilvarenbeek, The Netherlands; The Hit Factory, New York
- Genre: Progressive rock
- Length: 2:37
- Label: Charisma Records <re/>Atlantic Records
- Songwriter: Peter Gabriel
- Producer: Robert Fripp

Peter Gabriel singles chronology
"Modern Love" (1977)	"D.I.Y." (1978)	"Games Without Frontiers" (1980)

"D.I.Y." is a song written and recorded by English musician Peter Gabriel. It was included on his 1978 self-titled solo album and was released as a single in May with "Perspective" as a B-side, although it failed to chart.

A re-recorded version of "D.I.Y." was issued by Charisma Records in September 1978 with both "Mother of Violence" and "Me And My Teddy Bear" as the B-side; this single fared no better than the original. The re-recording of "D.I.Y.", which featured horns and an additional chorus, was later included on the 2019 compilation album Flotsam and Jetsam. The D.I.Y. acronym stands for do it yourself, which at the time echoed a flourishing ethos of self-sufficiency in the UK. Peter Christopherson created the single artwork.

== Background ==
Gabriel wrote "D.I.Y." as a response to some of the emerging bands at the time who he believed were embracing new-wave music, including the Sex Pistols. Rather than faithfully emulate the stylistic choices of these artists, Gabriel instead opted to capture the spirit of this music through an acoustic arrangement. Gabriel explained that he aimed for an acoustic arrangement due to his belief that there were few new wave artists who integrated acoustic instruments into their music.

While certain musical arrangements on Gabriel's 1978 eponymous release were developed by his backing band, Gabriel had already created the primary riff for "D.I.Y." prior to the song's formal presentation to the rest of the band. Gabriel said that the main melody derived from a hymn titled "Come, My Way". He had previously performed "D.I.Y." live as an instrumental in 1977. The chorus consists of the repetition of the song title, with an additional processed voice spelling out the acronym "do it yourself".

"D.I.Y." possesses a mid-tempo arrangement with accompaniment of drums, a chapman stick (serving the role of a bass), acoustic guitar, mandolin, and piano, the latter of which plays a series of ascending chromatic scales at various points throughout the song. The song is played in the key of D major and modulates through various time signatures, including 4/4, 5/4, and 7/4 time. According to Gabriel, Larry Fast made a suggestion to trigger portions of an eight-note melodic sequence each time the bass passed over a specific musical note. Gabriel characterised the effect as "sort of random, but it seems to have an order to it. It gives it a sort of live, machine-like quality." Fast said that his contributions to the song were otherwise minimal and amounted to the reinforcement of an acoustic guitar part with a Prophet-5 patch with detuned pulse waves. He processed the acoustic guitar with the Prophet-5 so that it would blend in with the other instruments. Todd Cochran played a Yamaha CP-70 electric piano and an ARP 2600 synthesiser on the recording.

Steve Taylor of Smash Hits reported that Gabriel and Robert Fripp engaged in "serious arguments" over the direction of "D.I.Y." Gabriel expressed some disappointment with the song's vocals, believing that they were not as light as he had hoped. He attributed this to the creative choices of Fripp, who aimed for rawer production and encouraged Gabriel to utilise some vocal takes that were tracked early on in the recording process. Gabriel's dissatisfaction with the original recording prompted him to rework the song for a different single mix.

In a 1979 interview with International Musician and Recording World, Gabriel denied that the song was about his departure from Genesis but was instead about self-determination. He said that the lyrics partially pertained to the idea that people who lack autonomy are bereft of fulfillment and satisfaction. Gabriel also stated that the song was about encouraging others to take initiative to actualize more optimal outcomes. "One has responsibility for a lot more than most people are prepared to accept. I believe in small groups of people having a lot more control over themselves than they do in the present." He also told Melody Maker that the song was a rebuke of nihilism.

== Release ==
"D.I.Y" was first released on 12 May 1978 under Charisma Records with "Perspective" as its B-side. The first 30,000 copies of the single were distributed in a special record sleeve.No music video for the song was ever filmed for "D.I.Y", although button badges were created to promote the single. Writing for NME, Nick Kent commented that "D.I.Y. seem[ed] destined to sink without a trace only three weeks after its release" in the UK, although Gabriel said that he "still believe[d] in D.I.Y. commercially" despite this. He also told the Liverpool Daily Post that he was surprised about the single's lack of success, saying that he and the record company originally thought that "D.I.Y." was an "obvious single, but not many people agreed."

In the 26 August 1978 edition of Billboard, the publication listed "D.I.Y." as one of the songs that Atlantic Records planned on releasing as a twelve-inch single in the United States "designed specifically for AOR radio use". A re-recorded version of "D.I.Y." was ultimately released as a single in September 1978, with the United Kingdom receiving the reissue through Charisma Records. This version featured the addition of an extra chorus and horns. Gabriel retained the original rhythm tracks but redid the vocals and added a saxophone part that he had originally envisioned. He said that the main riff was originally intended for brass instruments, but the idea only came to fruition for the song's re-recording. An extended remix was also issued as a twelve-inch single.

Two different songs were appended to the single as B-sides for the reissue. The first song was an edit of "Mother of Violence, which lacked the insect noises found on the album version; the second B-side was a lullaby titled "Teddy Bear". Gabriel had previously performed "Teddy Bear" live in various languages, including English, French and German. "Teddy Bear" was considered for the track listing of Gabriel's 1978 self-titled release, but it was later replaced with "Indigo". Similar to the original release of "D.I.Y.", the re-recording also failed to chart.

== Critical reception ==
The Chicago Sun-Times thought that "D.I.Y." was one of the few highlights on Gabriel's 1978 eponymous release. Rolling Stone was also complimentary of the song, labeling it as a "good rock number". The Rolling Stone Album Guide described the song as "a paean to self-produced punk" that was "especially prescient in the post-Napster world." Robert Christgau of The Village Voice earmarked "D.I.Y." as a "hard-rock landmark in a hard-rock year." NME noted the song's "potent" snare drum and "exquisite chord sequence complimenting the rhythm."

Cashbox wrote that the song had "a clever, esoteric feel and nice arrangement of horns, libido voices" with a "solid beat, piano and acoustic guitar scale runs and a hypnotic chorus." Record World was complimentary of the single remix, calling it "excellent" and said that the song "rocks with a message." Paste and The Guardian included the song on their lists of the greatest Peter Gabriel songs, with the latter deeming it a "crisp new-wave stomper".

In his book Without Frontiers: The Life and Music of Peter Gabriel, author Daryl Easlea favorably compared D.I.Y. to Gabriel's lead single from his debut album, "Solsbury Hill", adding that it was "another plea for independence" that evoked "the do it yourself ethos of the new wave movement". However, author Graeme Scarfe was more critical, saying that the song "lacks the charm of 'Solsbury Hill'". In a concert review for Gabriel's 1978 tour, the Derby Telegraph identified punk influences in "D.I.Y." and felt that the song was a musical departure from "Solsbury Hill".

== Live performances ==
Gabriel performed "D.I.Y." on his 1978 Scratch tour to promote his second solo album. During a joint performance with Tom Robinson at the Hammersmith Odeon on Christmas Eve, Gabriel included the song in the setlist. This event, dubbed The Charity Party, saw Gabriel and Robinson perform without their regular backing band for charity. 50 percent of the proceeds from the performance went toward the One-Parent Families organisation as selected by Gabriel and the other half went towards the Gay Rights Association, championed by Robinson. Gabriel preceded this benefit concert with four solo performances at the Hammersmith from 20-23 December. In 1979, Gabriel performed the song at the Reading Festival. He continued to perform the song through 1983, with one recording from a performance in the Midwestern United States appearing on Gabriel's Plays Live album.

== Track listing ==
Original 7" single

1. "D.I.Y." – 2:37
2. "Perspective" – 5:07

7" Reissue

1. "D.I.Y." (re-recorded single version) – 2:53
2. "Mother of Violence" (single mix) – 3:15
3. "Teddy Bear" – 2:17

== Personnel ==
- Peter Gabriel – vocals, piano
- Sid McGinnis – acoustic guitar, mandolin
- Todd Cochran – keyboards
- Larry Fast – treatments
- Tony Levin – Chapman stick
- Jerry Marotta – drums
