= Plays Live =

Live album by Peter Gabriel
- Released: 6 June 1983
- Recorded: 3, 4, 6, and 7 December 1982 (United States); Spring 1983 (Bath, England)
- Venues: Braden Auditorium (Normal); Memorial Hall (Kansas City); Chick Evans Field House (DeKalb); SIU Arena (Carbondale)
- Studio: Shabbey Road Studios (Bath)
- Genre: Art rock
- Length: 89:53 (original version); 66:50 (highlights version)
- Labels: Geffen (US & Canada), Charisma
- Producers: Peter Gabriel, Peter Walsh

Peter Gabriel chronology
Peter Gabriel (1982)	Plays Live (1983)	Birdy (1985)

Singles from Plays Live
- 1. "I Don't Remember" Released: June 1983 (UK); 2. "Solsbury Hill/I Go Swimming" Released: July 1983

Professional ratings
Review scores
Source	Rating
Allmusic	3.5/5 stars
Rolling Stone	3/5 stars

Plays Live is the first live and fifth album overall by the English rock musician Peter Gabriel. It was originally issued as a double album and long-play cassette in 1983, with sixteen songs. It was re-released in 1985, as a single CD called Plays Live (Highlights) with only twelve songs, some of which are edited so the album fits on a single disc. It was rereleased in its entirety as a double CD set in 1987. In 2002, a remaster of the Highlights version was issued. In 2019, the complete double-LP version was released on streaming platforms for the first time.

In 2021 the original 2CD version was released in remastered form. The sound recordings copyright (p) date featured on the back of the package suggests this had actually been remastered at the same time as the rest of Gabriel's back catalogue in 2002.

Armando Gallo took the cover photograph. "I was always listening to the music when I photographed a concert," he said. "Somehow my index finger pressed the clicker in time with the lights and the percussion - the heart of the music. I always felt grateful that I could shoot Peter's entire shows. Once I asked Peter if he didn't mind me being in the pit photographing his every move. 'No, I love to see a friendly face,' he answered. Making me feel good about it."

== Recordings ==
The songs for "Plays Live" were recorded at the following venues:

- Braden Auditorium at Illinois State University, Normal, Illinois, 3 December 1982
- Memorial Hall, Kansas City, Kansas, 4 December 1982
- Chick Evans Field House at Northern Illinois University, DeKalb, Illinois, 6 December 1982
- SIU Arena at Southern Illinois University, Carbondale, Illinois, 7 December 1982

Liner notes by "the producers" admit, "Although this album was compiled from four concerts in the mid-West of the United States, some additional recording took place not a thousand miles away from the home of the artist. The generic term for this process is 'cheating'. Care has been taken to keep the essence of the gigs intact, including 'human imperfection'."

== Singles and promotion ==
A remixed and sped-up version of "I Don't Remember" was issued as a 7" and 12" single in the United Kingdom. The single was accompanied by a live version of "Kiss of Life" from the 1982 tour. This live recording of "Kiss of Life" never appeared on any version of Plays Live, although it was included in Gabriel's 2019 compilation Flotsam and Jetsam.

In the US and Canada, "Solsbury Hill" was released as a single from Plays Live with "I Go Swimming" on the B-side, which was a previously unreleased song. "I Go Swimming" received airplay on album oriented rock radio stations in the United States and charted on the Billboard Top Tracks chart in 1983. The song was initially recorded for Gabriel's third album, although it did not appear on the final track listing. Gabriel had previously performed the song on his 1980 tour.

== Track listing ==
All tracks are written by Peter Gabriel.

Side one
No.	Title	Length
1.	"The Rhythm of the Heat"	6:26
2.	"I Have the Touch"	5:18
3.	"Not One of Us"	5:29
4.	"Family Snapshot"	4:44

Side two
No.	Title	Length
5.	"D.I.Y."	4:20
6.	"The Family and the Fishing Net"	7:22
7.	"Intruder"	5:03
8.	"I Go Swimming"	4:44

Side three
No.	Title	Length
9.	"San Jacinto"	8:27
10.	"Solsbury Hill"	4:42
11.	"No Self Control"	5:03
12.	"I Don't Remember"	4:19

Side four
No.	Title	Length
13.	"Shock the Monkey"	7:10
14.	"Humdrum"	4:23
15.	"On the Air"	5:22
16.	"Biko"	7:01
Total length:		89:53

Plays Live (Highlights)
No.	Title	Length
1.	"I Have the Touch"	4:47
2.	"Family Snapshot"	4:44
3.	"D.I.Y."	4:05
4.	"The Family and the Fishing Net"	7:38
5.	"I Go Swimming"	4:54
6.	"San Jacinto"	8:19
7.	"Solsbury Hill"	4:41
8.	"No Self Control"	5:04
9.	"I Don't Remember"	4:12
10.	"Shock the Monkey"	7:10
11.	"Humdrum"	4:21
12.	"Biko"	6:52
Total length:		66:50

== Personnel ==
=== Musicians ===
- Peter Gabriel – lead vocals, synthesizers, electric piano
- Jerry Marotta – drums, percussion, backing vocals
- Tony Levin – bass, Chapman stick, backing vocals
- David Rhodes – guitars, backing vocals
- Larry Fast – synthesizers, DK Synergy, electric piano

=== Technical ===
- Produced by Peter Gabriel and Peter Walsh
- Engineered and mixed by Peter Walsh
- Live recording engineered by Neil Kernon
- Digitally mastered by Greg Fulginiti at The Townhouse (London) and Artisan Sound Recorders (Los Angeles)
- Front cover photography – Armando Gallo
- Back cover photography – Margaret Maxwell
- Inner sleeve photography – Armando Gallo, Margaret Maxwell, and Tony Levin
- Management – Gail Colson and Norma Bishop (Gailforce)

== Charts ==
Chart (1983)	Peak position
Australian Albums (Kent Music Report)	55
Canada Top Albums/CDs (RPM)	18
Dutch Albums (Album Top 100)	21
German Albums (Offizielle Top 100)	40
New Zealand Albums (RMNZ)	25
Swedish Albums (Sverigetopplistan)	31
UK Albums (Official Charts)	8
US Billboard 200	44

Chart (2021)	Peak position
Scottish Albums (Official Charts)	23
