= Go Publishing =

American music magazine publisher

Go Publishing Company, Inc.
- Headquarters: 35 West 56th Street New York, N.Y. 10019

Go Publishing was an American music magazine publisher founded by Robin Leach. Titles included GO Magazine, R'n'B World, and Stereo Review. It was mainly active during the late 1960s.

== History ==
Robin Leach had immigrated to the US from England in the 1960s and worked for publications such as New York Daily News and People, before launching Go Magazine (sometimes stylised GO Magazine or Go! Magazine) in May 1966. The new magazine, an oversized tabloid, was published by his company Go Publishing and ran for two years. When The Yardbirds first toured America, the first magazine to publish a story about the band was Go.

Go Magazine was published weekly in New York and distributed by radio stations to record stores, where it was given away for free. It began in New York with a partnership with WMCA, and by April 1967 was distributing 390,000 copies in thirteen cities. It was 12-16 pages with charts supplied by the local radio stations while all other content remained the same nationally. The magazine shifted focus from pop music to underground acts, and ended in October 1969, before relaunching in 1970 for four issues before closing again. The annual Go publication was also published by Pyramid Books featuring writing from Go Magazine.

In 1968, Go Publishing began a new music magazine titled R'n'B World. It followed the same system as Go, and was connected with radio stations who provided local charts. R'n'B World was published bi-weekly. In late 1969, the magazine was retitled Afro-Star, and folded by 1971.

In March 1969, Leach announced that Go Publishing had acquired Student Marketing Institute as a way to expand Market-GO Inc., their youth marketing promotional arm. They also planned to open POP Shops, a chain of youth-oriented stores in April 1969. They launched the first Pop Shop in May 1969 in Brooklyn, and had plans for 70 more to open by Christmas. They were described as "A mini department store with psychedelic, atmosphere, stocked with records, fashions, etc., and catering to teen-agers and young adults." Go was also an affiliate of Disc O Mat National Inc., a record vending machine business.

Staff included Loraine Alterman (editor Go Magazine and R'n'B World), Dan Langdon (feature writer Go Magazine and R'n'B World), and Richard Robinson (writer Go Magazine).

== Publications ==
- Go Magazine, volume 1 issues 1-196 (1966-69), volume 2 issues 1-4 (1970)
- Go Annual (1968-69)
- R'n'B World (1968-69), retitled Afro-Star (1969-1971)
- Stereo Review
- The Inside Story Of The Yellow Submarine Souvenir Special (1968)
- The Official Yellow Submarine Magazine (1968)
- Zoo News (1972), from issue 5 retitled Zoo World (1972-75)

== Archives ==
New York Public Library hold a collection of clippings relating to Go Publishing. Select issues have been digitised by Adam Matthew Digital.
