= I Go Swimming =

Promotional single by Peter Gabriel

from the album Plays Live
- A-side: "Solsbury Hill"
- Released: 1983
- Recorded: 1982
- Length: 4:44
- Label: Charisma; Geffen
- Songwriter: Peter Gabriel
- Producers: Peter Gabriel, Peter Walsh

"I Go Swimming" is a song by the English rock musician Peter Gabriel. He had initially recorded the song for his 1980 album, Peter Gabriel, but it was not included on the final release. That same year, Gabriel performed the song on the album's accompanying tour. A live recording was then included on his 1983 live album Plays Live. This recording was released as a promotional single and reached No. 38 on the Billboard Album Rock Tracks chart.

== Background ==
=== Early recordings and live performances ===
"I Go Swimming" was among the roughly 15 songs considered for Gabriel's third self-titled solo album, which was released in 1980. Gabriel discussed "I Go Swimming" in a 1980 interview with Melody Maker, where he called the song's lyrics "superficial and somewhat lighthearted". He mentioned that "I Go Swimming" would have been included on his third solo album if he had finished the lyrics. He revisited the song in July 1981 at Crescent Studios, with David Lord serving as the co-producer and engineer for this mix.

Gabriel performed the song live on his 1980 tour, which was billed as the Tour of China Tour 1984. Reviewing Gabriel's March 1980 performance in Edinburgh, Hugh Fielder of Sounds said that Gabriel had "clearly yet to write the lyrics as he sang little more than the title as he swam around the stage. In an interview with Melody Maker published in July 1980, Gabriel said that he had still yet to finalise the lyrics. During some renditions of "I Go Swimming" from this tour, Gabriel would also fall face down into the audience. He explained that this technique, which he dubbed The Dive, was developed after he had read a literary resource on psychological group activities titled The New Games Book. He said that it was "one thing trusting people alongside you to not let you fall on the floor and at worst bruise yourself, and quite another to trust an audience many feet below to cushion you from real harm."

Gabriel performed the song at the first WOMAD festival, which took place in July 1982 at the Bath & West Showground in Shepton Mallet. It later appeared on the Live at WOMAD 1982 album, which was released on digital platforms in 2025 and received a physical release the following year.

=== Release ===
In 1983, "I Go Swimming" was the only previously unreleased song to be included on Gabriel's Plays Live double album, which included material taken from his 1982 performances in Illinois and Kansas. When introducing "I Go Swimming", Gabriel said that the song was for "those whose minds are as healthy as their bodies." Later that year, "I Go Swimming" debuted and peaked at No. 38 on the Billboard Album Rock Tracks. "I Go Swimming" was also included on the 1984 soundtrack album Hard to Hold. A re-recorded instrumental rendition of "I Go Swimming", titled "GA-GA", was featured as a B-side to Gabriel's 1987 "Red Rain" single. "GA-GA", which was produced by Steve Lillywhite and engineered by Hugh Padgham, features a saxophone as the song's lead instrument. This recording was later included on the Flotsam and Jetsam digital-exclusive album.

Martin Scorsese, who commissioned Gabriel to develop the soundtrack for The Last Temptation of Christ commented that "I Go Swimming" was one of the tracks that attracted him to Gabriel's work, saying that "the lyrics start quite ordinarily before taking off to reach a spiritual level." The lyrics relate to the benefits of swimming and the instrumentation is built around a bass groove with funk elements played by Tony Levin.

== Personnel ==
- Peter Gabriel – vocals, keyboards
- David Rhodes – guitar, backing vocals
- Tony Levin – Chapman stick
- Larry Fast – synthesizers
- Jerry Marotta – drums, percussion

== Chart performance ==
Chart (1983)	Peak position
US Mainstream Rock (Billboard)	38
