= Zoo World =

Defunct American rock music magazine

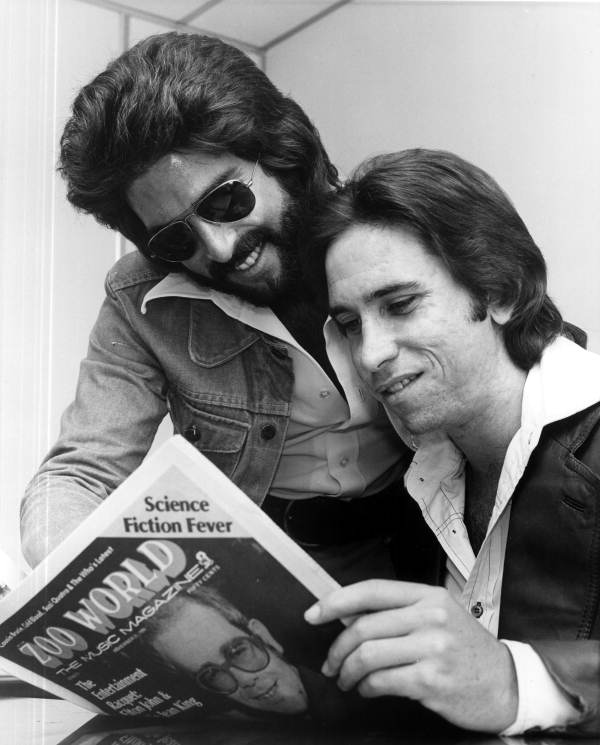
- Zoo World ad sales manager Arnie Wohl (left) and publisher Les Feldman reading Zoo World in Fort Lauderdale
- Categories: Music magazine
- Frequency: Bi-weekly
- Publisher: Les Feldman
- First issue: January 1972
- Final issue: January 1975
- Country: United States
- Based in: Fort Lauderdale, FL
- Language: English

Zoo World was an American bi-weekly rock music magazine that operated between 1972 and 1975. Available throughout the United States, it was published in Fort Lauderdale, Florida and intended as a rival to Rolling Stone. In early issues of the magazine, the cover carried a subtitle reading: "The Music Megapaper".

== History ==
Launched by Go Publishing on 27 January 1972 and originally titled Zoo News, it was renamed Zoo World for its fifth issue, and retained that name for the rest of its publication. From the second issue the publisher is listed as Les Feldman.

The publication was funded by Florida businessman Jack P. Hunt. Its offices were in a building he owned at the corner of Oakland Park Boulevard and Bayview Drive. The magazine grew to include offices in New York, Los Angeles and Chicago, with a combined staff of 60 under publisher Les Feldman. A contemporary report in the Lauderdale Ledger described Zoo World as a "bi-weekly tabloid featuring record reviews, feature articles on rock celebrities and gossipy news stories on the music world".

Among its contributors were journalists and authors Jim Esposito, Arthur Levy, Michael Gross, Jon Tiven, Nick Tosches, Wayne Robins, John Swenson, Steven Rosen, Gene Sculatti, Ira Robbins, David Rensin and Barbara Charone. In an online discussion at the music critics' website rockcritics.com, in February 2013, author and journalist Richard Riegel recalled that Zoo World resembled Rolling Stone in format, and he likened the title's "editorial personality" to that of Crawdaddy! following the departure of that magazine's founding editor, Paul Williams.

By the time of its demise in January 1975, Zoo World enjoyed a circulation of 300,000. Although Feldman and his colleagues were confident that the magazine remained a viable title, Hunt's withdrawal of his patronage forced its closure, the decision for which was announced to employees in December 1974. Dated January 2, 1975, the cover of the magazine's 75th and final issue carried a picture of soul singer Barry White.
