= Peter Gabriel (1977 album) =

Debut solo album by Peter Gabriel

Studio album by Peter Gabriel
- Released: 25 February 1977
- Recorded: 1976
- Studios: The Soundstage, Toronto; Morgan, London; Olympic, London
- Genres: Art rock; pop; progressive rock
- Length: 41:42
- Label: Charisma
- Producer: Bob Ezrin

Peter Gabriel chronology
Peter Gabriel (1977)	Peter Gabriel (1978)

Singles from Peter Gabriel
- 1. "Solsbury Hill" Released: 25 March 1977; 2. "Modern Love" Released: 17 June 1977

Peter Gabriel is the debut studio album by the English singer-songwriter Peter Gabriel, released in February 1977 by Charisma Records. After his departure from the progressive rock band Genesis was made public in 1975, Gabriel took a break to concentrate on his family life. In 1976, he began writing material for a solo album and met producer Bob Ezrin, who agreed to produce it. Gabriel hired several additional musicians, including guitarist Robert Fripp and bassist Tony Levin.

The album was later known as Peter Gabriel I or Car, referring to the album's artwork produced by Hipgnosis. Some music streaming services, including Gabriel's own Bandcamp page, refer to it as Peter Gabriel 1: Car.

Peter Gabriel reached No. 7 on the UK Albums Chart and No. 38 on the US Billboard 200. It is certified gold in both countries for selling 100,000 and 500,000 copies, respectively. "Solsbury Hill" was the first single, and reached No. 13 in the UK. Gabriel supported the album with a tour of Europe and the US during 1977, featuring a seven-piece band including Fripp and Levin. The album was remastered in 2002 and 2011.

== Background and recording ==
In August 1975, Gabriel's departure from the progressive rock band Genesis was made public. Early in their tour supporting the album The Lamb Lies Down on Broadway (1974), he had announced to the group his decision to leave, citing estrangement from the other members, the strains on his marriage, and his wish to spend more time with his family. He also wanted to avoid giving the impression of quitting Genesis "to run off and do my solo album", and took a break. Genesis drummer Phil Collins, who later replaced Gabriel as lead vocalist, said the band had known about Gabriel's departure for some time. When they learned that Gabriel was to make a solo album, they sent a telegram wishing him luck.

Gabriel relocated to New York City, where he rented a flat from Garson Kanin. During this time, Gabriel would write songs on a piano in Canadian producer Bob Ezrin's apartment on 52nd Street. Ezrin's favourite ideas were then recorded on a cassette, after which Gabriel would refine these ideas further in England. By mid-1976, Gabriel had recorded a collection of demos for his album. One of these songs, "Excuse Me", had been written in 1975 with poet Martin Hall; the two men's creative partnership predated Gabriel's departure from Genesis. He considered several producers, including Todd Rundgren and Jack Nitzsche. Someone suggested Bob Ezrin, known for working with Alice Cooper, Lou Reed and Kiss. Gabriel played his demo of "Here Comes the Flood" to Ezrin, who enjoyed the track so much he went to bed that night singing the song. He said: "We understood each other. We talked. There was an excellent rapport immediately – a human rapport – and that was what I was looking for above all." The pair agreed to share production duties; Ezrin led the "American rhythm sections" and "very rock passages", while Gabriel led the "more European things" and "quiet parts".

Peter Gabriel was recorded at The Soundstage in Toronto in the autumn of 1976, with additional sessions at Morgan and Olympic Studios in London. Gabriel was uncertain of what parts he could and could not perform, so he agreed to Ezrin's choice of musicians, including bassist Tony Levin. Some of the musicians, including synthesizer player Larry Fast and guitarist Robert Fripp, were selected by Gabriel to tackle his soundscape-oriented ideas. Roy Bittan of the E Street Band was originally contacted to contribute keyboards, but management prevented him from participating, so Gabriel selected Jozef Chirowski as his keyboardist instead. Ezrin was responsible for recruiting the remaining musicians, including drummer Allan Schwartzberg, percussionist Jimmy Maelen, and guitarist Steve Hunter. Many of the session musicians had previously worked together on some Lou Reed and Alice Cooper records.

Gabriel described the Toronto sessions as "fast, exciting and hot". After two days of hearing Levin play, Gabriel invited him to play on the tour. During the sessions in Toronto, Fast recalled that Ezrin wore a whistle around his neck and would blow the whistle at the session musicians when he was displeased with their playing. After the sessions concluded in Toronto, a dinner was arranged at the Napoleon Restaurant where Ezrin bestowed gifts upon the session musicians, which included a tuba for Levin and a gold antique watch for Fripp.

Although mainly happy with the music, Gabriel felt that the album, particularly "Here Comes the Flood", was overproduced. He would later record and perform versions of that song exclusively with keyboards and voice, including a recording on Fripp's album Exposure and his appearance on Kate Bush's television special in December 1979, during which Gabriel and Bush also sang "Another Day" by Roy Harper. A third version appeared on the 1990 compilation album Shaking the Tree: Sixteen Golden Greats. Gabriel often performs the song live, accompanied by only himself on keyboard, either in German (called "Jetzt Kommt Die Flut") or English, depending on the audience. The song debuted during an appearance on Thames Television's Good Afternoon in the summer of 1976.

== Artwork ==
The front cover depicts Gabriel sitting in the rear seat of a 1974 Lancia 2000 owned by Storm Thorgerson, co-founder of Hipgnosis and the cover's designer. For the shoot, which took place in Wandsworth, London, the car was sprayed with water from a hose. The black-and-white image was then hand-coloured, and reflections modified (using a scalpel) by artist Richard Manning. Because Gabriel's first four albums were not titled or numbered, the album later became informally known as Car. An alternative proposal was to feature a photograph of Gabriel wearing contact lenses intended to give his eyes the appearance of metallic ball bearings; this was included on the inner sleeve.

== Release ==
The planned release date for Peter Gabriel was 7 February 1977; Music Week later announced that it would be released by Atlantic Records during the week of 5 February 1977 in North America and 18 February 1977 by Charisma Records throughout the rest of the world. Peter Gabriel was ultimately released later that month on Charisma Records in Europe and Atco Records in North America. Billboard listed the album as a "national breakout" in the 26 February 1977 edition of the publication. (Note: Billboard's national breakout designation is based on regional and national adds to radio stations, airplay, and requests.) Peter Gabriel reached No. 7 in the UK and No. 38 in the US. "Solsbury Hill", the first single, became a Top 20 hit in the UK and reached No. 68 on the Billboard Hot 100. The second single, "Modern Love", did not chart.

After Peter Gabriel's release, Gabriel assembled a touring band, consisting of Fripp (occasionally using the pseudonym "Dusty Rhodes", and sometimes performing from offstage) and Hunter on guitar, Levin on bass, Fast on synthesisers, Schwartzberg on drums, Phil Aaberg on keyboards and Jimmy Maelen on percussion. The first leg of his debut solo tour, entitled "Expect the Unexpected", started on 5 March 1977 in the United States and continued until April. The UK portion of the tour concluded on 30 April. In July, NME announced that Gabriel would playing 15 concerts in Europe during the months of September and October. This leg of the tour consisted of a different band that included Sid McGinnis on guitar, Levin on bass, Jerry Marotta on drums and Bayeté (Todd Cochran) on keyboards.

Peter Gabriel was remastered in 2002 by Real World Records on the CD, SACD, and LP format, with Classic Records assisting with the pressing of the vinyl release. For the vinyl reissue, Classic Records was supplied with analog copies from Metropolis Group tape machines devoid of any compression and EQ, along with high-resolution audio files as reference points to guide the mastering process, which was completed by Bernie Grundman.

== Reception ==
Professional ratings
Review scores
Source	Rating
AllMusic	4.5/5 stars
Chicago Sun-Times	3/4 stars
Classic Rock	9/10
Entertainment Weekly	A
Q	3/5 stars
Record Mirror	4/5 stars
The Rolling Stone Album Guide	3/5 stars
Sounds	5/5 stars
Uncut	7/10
The Village Voice	B+

In Beat Instrumental, Peter Douglas called the album a "mixed effort, but a brave one". He felt that the music was diverse and varied and found Ezrin's production to have lived up to his expectations "in all respects" with the exception of the vocals, which he believed were "consistently indistinct." Nick Kent, writing in NME in 1978, said that Peter Gabriel was "a fine record with at least one 24-carat irresistible classic in 'Solsbury Hill' and a strong supporting cast of material that, all in all, in a year besmeared with great albums was, in retrospect, sorely underrated". The album received the prize of the French Académie Charles Cros.

Rolling Stone critic Stephen Demorest described Peter Gabriel as "a grab bag collection of songs that bear little resemblance to one another" and called it "an impressively rich debut album". Robert Christgau of The Village Voice found it "a lot smarter" than Gabriel's past work in Genesis, and despite noting that "every time I delve beneath its challenging textures to decipher a line or two I come up a little short", felt that it was "worth considering".

Billboard felt that Gabriel's vocals were "well suited" for the varied instrumentation and stylistic choices. Record World found each track stylistically diverse, highlighting the barbershop quartet influences on "Excuse Me" and the twelve-bar blues of "Waiting for the Big One". Cashbox called the album an "eclectic musical masterpiece" that was "well worth the wait".

Reviewing the 2002 remastered version released by Real World Records in partnership with the audiophile company Classic Records, Hi-Fi+ magazine found this reissue to be superior to the original vinyl version, saying that "where the original LP was a little murky and slightly fluffy in the bass, this new version sparkles with life, and the bottom end has taken on new levels of impact."

== Track listing ==
All tracks are written by Peter Gabriel, with additional writers noted.

Side one
No.	Title	Writer(s)	Length
1.	"Moribund the Burgermeister"		4:20
2.	"Solsbury Hill"		4:21
3.	"Modern Love"		3:38
4.	"Excuse Me"	Martin Hall	3:20
5.	"Humdrum"		3:25

Side two
No.	Title	Length
6.	"Slowburn"	4:36
7.	"Waiting for the Big One"	7:15
8.	"Down the Dolce Vita"	5:05
9.	"Here Comes the Flood"	5:38
Total length:		41:42

== Personnel ==
=== Musicians ===
- Peter Gabriel – lead vocals, keyboards, flute, recorder
- Robert Fripp – electric guitar, classical guitar, banjo (4)
- Steve Hunter – acoustic guitar (2), lead guitar (6, 7), electric and acoustic rhythm guitar, pedal steel
- Dick Wagner – backing vocals, electric guitar (9)
- Tony Levin – bass, tuba, leader of Barbershop Quartet (4)
- Jozef Chirowski – keyboards, additional vocals (4)
- Larry Fast – synthesizer, programming
- Allan Schwartzberg – drums, directories
- Jim Maelen – percussion, synthibam, bones, additional vocals (4)
- London Symphony Orchestra – strings (8, 9)
- Michael Gibbs – orchestral arrangement

=== Technical ===
- Produced by Bob Ezrin
- Engineered by Brian Christian
- Additional engineers – Robert Hrycyna, Jim Frank, Dave Harris, Rod O'Brien, Robert Stasiak, and Keith Grant
- Mastered by George Graves and Craig Richardson at J.A.M.F. (Toronto, Canada)
- Cover – Hipgnosis
- Organization – Tony Smith, Brian Murray-Smith, and Alex Sim at Hit & Run

== Charts ==
=== Weekly charts ===
Chart (1977)	Peak position
Australian Albums (Kent Music Report)	25
Austrian Albums (Ö3 Austria)	10
Canada Top Albums/CDs (RPM)	30
Dutch Albums (Album Top 100)	9
French Albums (SNEP)	5
German Albums (Offizielle Top 100)	9
New Zealand Albums (RMNZ)	38
Norwegian Albums (VG-lista)	5
Swedish Albums (Sverigetopplistan)	8
UK Albums (Official Charts)	7
US Billboard 200	38

=== Year-end charts ===
Chart (1977)	Position
UK Albums (OCC)	42

== Certifications ==
Region	Certification	Certified units/sales
Australia (ARIA)	Gold	20,000^{^}
France (SNEP)	Gold	100,000^{*}
Germany (BVMI)	Gold	250,000^{^}
United Kingdom (BPI)	Gold	100,000^{^}
United States (RIAA)	Gold	500,000^{^}
^{*} Sales figures based on certification alone.^{^} Shipments figures based on certification alone.
