= Peter Gabriel (1978 album) =

Second solo album by Peter Gabriel

Studio album by Peter Gabriel
- Released: 2 June 1978
- Recorded: November 1977 – February 1978
- Studios: Relight Studios, Hilvarenbeek, The Netherlands; The Hit Factory, New York; Trident Studios, London
- Genres: Rock; art rock; progressive rock
- Length: 41:29
- Label: Charisma
- Producer: Robert Fripp

Peter Gabriel chronology
Peter Gabriel (1977)	Peter Gabriel (1978)	Peter Gabriel (1980)

Singles from Peter Gabriel
- 1. "D.I.Y." Released: 12 May 1978

Peter Gabriel is the second studio album by the English singer-songwriter Peter Gabriel, released on 2 June 1978 by Charisma Records. Gabriel started recording the album in November 1977, the same month that he had completed touring in support of his debut solo release. He employed former King Crimson guitarist Robert Fripp, who was part of Gabriel's early touring band, to produce the album. Fripp used his Frippertronics effects on the co-written song "Exposure".

The album's cover artwork by Hipgnosis led to it becoming known as Scratch to differentiate it from Gabriel's other eponymously titled albums.

The album reached No. 10 on the UK Albums Chart and No. 45 on the US Billboard Pop Albums chart. Unlike Gabriel's previous release, his second album did not produce any charting singles, with "D.I.Y." failing to chart during both its original release in May 1978 and re-release in September later that year.

== Background ==
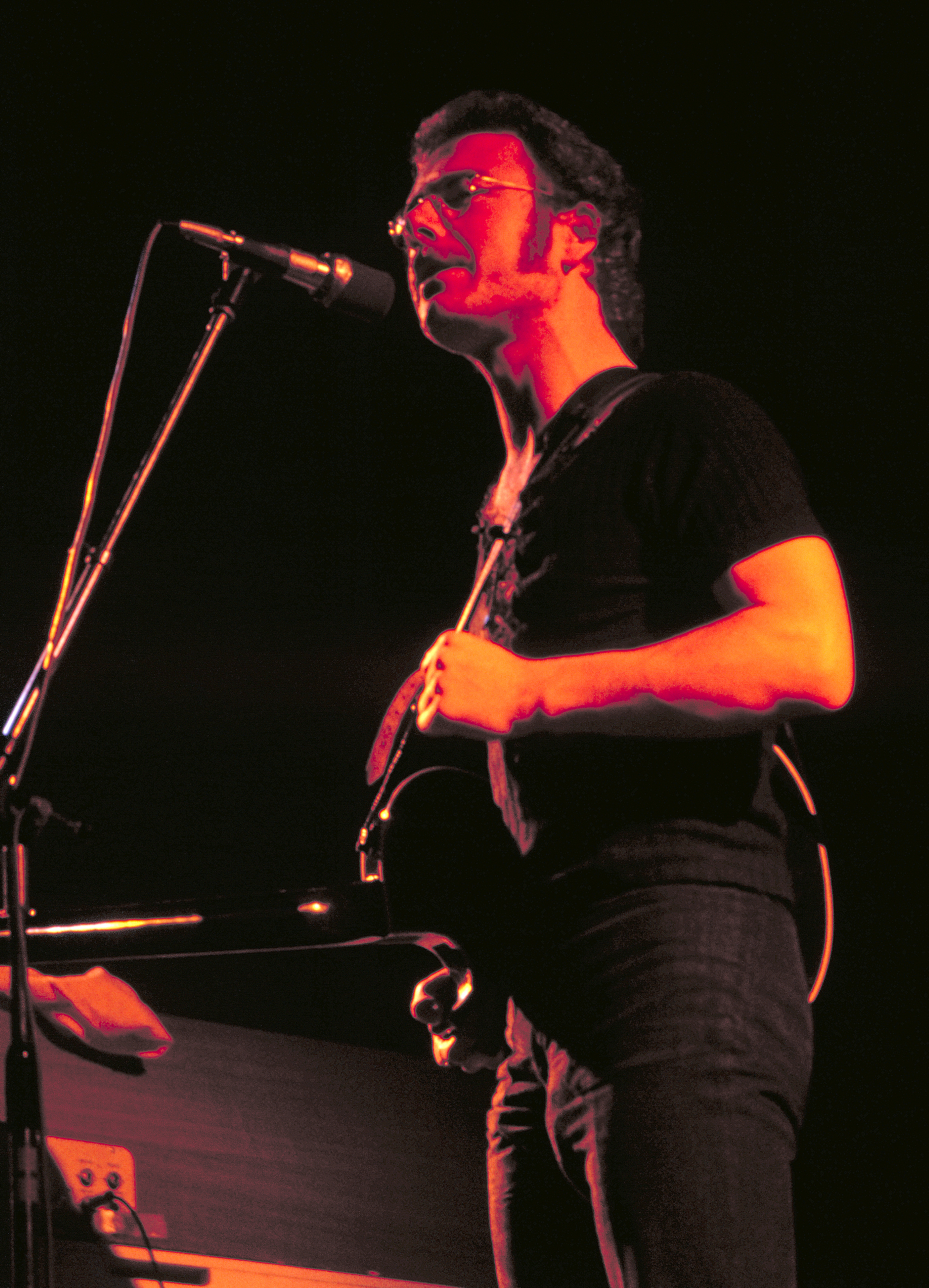
Robert Fripp produced the album

Gabriel briefly considered working again with the producer of his first album, Bob Ezrin, but ultimately decided against it. Gabriel instead selected Robert Fripp and established a goal of making his second solo effort a pop album. Compared to Ezrin, who was more insistent on dictating the arrangements, Fripp favoured a more spontaneous work process that allowed Gabriel to contribute his own musical ideas. Gabriel credited Fripp with creating a studio environment that was conducive to creativity.

Robert's approach to the process of recording was very good. He likes situations to happen rather than make them happen. On the first album I wasn't confident of my own ability in arrangement, whereas on the last one I was a lot more confident and had definite ideas.

At the suggestion of Fripp, Gabriel worked on demos of the songs over the course of three days. This allowed the two to familiarize themselves with the song structures and provided the recording engineer an opportunity to achieve workable sounds with the instruments. Roughly half of the songs were recorded in Holland, with the remaining work being conducted in New York City. Gabriel remarked that the sessions in Holland were done relatively efficiently, whereas the New York City sessions were more protracted.

=== Recording ===
Several members of Gabriel's touring band participated in the recording of his second solo album. Gabriel told Dale Kawashima of Cashbox that the rapport he developed with these musicians during his solo tours contributed to a more comfortable recording environment, saying that "they were no longer just session men to me, but friends." He commented that the album's musical arrangements "flowed very naturally" and that it was a "much easier LP to record" compared to his first solo release. Gabriel described the band's approach to the material as "very hard-edged" and believed that synthesisers were integrated into the arrangements more than his first solo album, albeit in a way that was "used less like a string section."

When they were not working in the recording studio, Gabriel and his band would bond over games of Scrabble and Risk, which they played at a shared house without central heating. These games would sometimes go until 3–4 a.m., which Gabriel said "was not very good when we were going back into the studio at 9 or 10am. That alone may not account for some of the problems with that record, but it didn't help the process!"

== Composition ==
Some of the material on Gabriel's second solo album had been performed live one year prior to its eventual release. "On the Air" dated back to 1976, when it was first recorded for inclusion on Gabriel's first solo album. This version was arranged in 6/8 time and built around a set of lyrics developed by Gabriel around the fictional character of Mozo, an individual enamored with shortwave radio. The 1976 studio version was left unfinished and unreleased, although Gabriel did include the song in the setlist of his first solo tour in 1977. The song was then reworked with a 4/4 time signature and a different tempo.

"Indigo" was centered around the concept of a dying father in his house who is coming to terms with his own death. Gabriel performed this song on his 1977 tour, with early renditions lacking any lyrics; he would instead perform by singing gibberish into harmonizer device that heavily processed his voice. Gabriel had also performed early versions of "D.I.Y and "Animal Magic" on this 1977 tour before finishing them for his 1978 album.

"Mother of Violence" was co-written by Gabriel and his wife Jill and began as a Christmas carol for children at their village church near Bath, Somerset. Gabriel said that "A Wonderful Day in a One-Way World" was inspired by supermarkets with one-way mirrors, which was intended to represent situations where participants are unaware that they are being observed "like a white rat in a laboratory". He felt that a supermarket would serve as a suitable setting for the song based on his belief that it would demonstrate how consumers are unwittingly influenced by the marketing product manufacturers based on packaging and marketing. The song's storyline follows a person who is encouraged to purchase "eternal youth" from an old man, who later introduces themselves as Einstein. When the song's protagonist declines, a voice coming from a one-way mirror orders for the supermarket doors to be shut as punishment for his refusal to purchase the product.

The ten coaches referenced in the song "White Shadow" were intended by Gabriel to carry similarities to the Ten Lost Tribes. The White Shadow in the song takes on the form of a hybrid between a nature spirit and Death on a white horse. Gabriel wrote "Flotsam and Jetsam" around the idea of water as an inseparable aspect of floating and sinking objects. On "Flotsam and Jetsam", Gabriel said "the medium which gives them movement has been removed", resulting in the objects washing up on a beach. Gabriel likened this to the sensation of lying down in a bathtub as the water drains out. At one point in the album's development, Gabriel planned on appending the song with the subtitle of "Twentieth Century Love Story".

"Home Sweet Home" was inspired by a story Gabriel read in a newspaper about a financially distressed mother who jumped out of the window of her home with her child. Gabriel used this narrative to write lyrics about a husband who benefits from their death by securing a significant amount of money through life insurance. He added another component to the song where the husband attains more wealth by gambling with the insurance money.

== Production ==
Fripp used his Frippertronics technique on the track "Exposure", which he and Gabriel co-wrote. He later recorded a version of the song as the title track of his 1979 solo album Exposure. Fripp also pitch shifted Gabriel's vocals with an Eventide Harmonizer, which created a "slightly off key" vocal effect according to Stephen W Tayler, who served as an audio engineer for the album.

Gabriel and Fripp desired an album with raw production. They preferred to prioritise minimal run-throughs and would discard an idea if they were unable to attain satisfactory results after roughly three attempts. Gabriel explained that he wanted the album to be "more simple, more direct", with some imperfections left in, particularly with the vocals. He also said that there were a few songs on the album with "rough edges and some mistakes", which he decided to keep to make the album sound "more alive". He described his second album as sounding more spontaneous than his debut release because of these factors.

Stephen Short was originally tasked with mixing the album at Trident Studios after previously serving as a tape op at the facility. Tayler recalled that Short was a relatively recent hire at Trident Studios and observed that he encountered difficulties in managing disagreements between Fripp and Gabriel over the album's production. The remainder of the album was mixed by Tayler, who described the album as "very dry sounding". He partially attributed this to Fripp's preference to minimise the use of reverb. "He had a concept called 'secret reverb,' which meant if you could hear it, then it was too loud."

Fripp had produced to other albums around the same time in New York, including his solo album Exposure and Sacred Songs by Daryl Hall. In Fripp's mind, these recordings along with Gabriel's second solo album combined to make a trilogy. According to Gabriel, Fripp felt that he was not given enough creative liberties when producing Gabriel's 1978 album, whereas he felt more fulfilled working with Hall.

== Artwork and liner notes ==
The cover depicts an image of Gabriel with several vertical grooves gouged into it that end at his fingertips. He stands with hands raised, palms facing himself, and fingers bent to simulate the appearance of tearing the image. The effect was achieved by gluing strips of torn paper onto a photo of Gabriel in the appropriate pose, taken by photographer Peter Christopherson, then using Tipp-Ex correction fluid to touch up the spots where they met his fingers. Gabriel mentioned that the inner illustrations found in the liner notes were meant to convey the sense of an individual who unaware that they are being observed by using iconography that represents a scientific/psychological analysis.

During the assembly of the album package, Fripp wanted to include the phrase Produced by Robert Fripp for Peter Gabriel in the liner notes to reflect his belief that he abdicated too much creative control to Gabriel. Gabriel said that Fripp suggested this credit "because some of the style of the sound was not altogether what he wanted. He didn't want people to think that was exactly how he would have interpreted the music".

== Release ==
Gabriel commented on the decision to release his second solo album under the name Peter Gabriel, saying that he wanted the album to be associated more with its artwork rather than its name; he also felt that it was "farcical to produce these profound titles." Gabriel explained that he wanted each of his solo albums to resemble a different issue of a magazine, where record buyers would recognize the album by the picture on the front rather than the title. At one point, Gabriel also considered titling his second solo album Exposure.

In the United Kingdom, Charisma Records launched a promotional campaign for the album that included five 15-second slots on radio stations every day from 31 May to 10 June on certain radio stations including Piccadilly Radio, Radio Clyde, and Radio Forth. Full-page advertisements were placed in Melody Maker, New Musical Express, and Sounds for three weeks. Charisma also set up window displays in around 300 retail stores across the United Kingdom as part of their promotional efforts.

In the United States, Gabriel promoted the album through radio interviews with Lew Irwin of Earth News Radio and also conducted interviews with Star Trak and Record Report. Parts of Gabriel's interview with the Westwood One radio show Star Trak were published in the 22 July 1978 edition of Cashbox. His second self-titled album was released in the United States by Atlantic Records, which had not handled the distribution of his first album.

In a 1980 interview with Smash Hits, Gabriel stated that he failed to attain the results he desired on his second solo release in part because of his creative differences with Fripp. Gabriel believed that Fripp lacked an understanding on how to effectively record synthesisers and said that the two "spent too much time on theoretical arguments." He also expressed his opinion that "On the Air" and "White Shadow" were the only songs on the album that received sufficient attention in the recording studio. Larry Fast, who played synthesisers on the album, thought that Fripp's production choices did not adversely impact his contributions and felt that it was a "liberating" experience working with some of the drier arrangements.

In an interview published in July 2003, Gabriel said that his second album was recorded faster than all of his other records. Gabriel commented that his second album was the only one that he "really felt was lacking", adding that he "never really liked the sound of it". When preparing the 2002 remaster of his catalog, Gabriel insisted on making more adjustments to his second album than any other record in his discography.

== Critical reception ==
Professional ratings
Review scores
Source	Rating
AllMusic	4/5 stars
Chicago Sun-Times	3/4 stars
Classic Rock	7/10
Encyclopedia of Popular Music	4/5 stars
Entertainment Weekly	B+
Q	4/5 stars
Rolling Stone	3.5/5 stars
The Rolling Stone Album Guide	3/5 stars
Uncut	7/10
The Village Voice	B−

Writing for New Musical Express, Nick Kent said that the album's "brazenly left-field veneer left me cold at first, and it's only now that its strengths are starting to come across ... once past the disarming non-focus veneer, there's a quietly remarkable talent at work – quiet in the manner of the slow fuse burn of 'Mother of Violence' with Roy Bittan's piano work outstripping anything he's turned out for either Bruce Springsteen or David Bowie. Closer to the root of the album, there's a purity, a strength to the songs individual enough to mark Gabriel out as a man whose creative zenith is close at hand."

In a different review published by New Musical Express, Steve Clarke expressed his opinion that Fripp was a better fit as a producer than Bob Ezrin, who had produced Gabriel's debut album. He felt that Fripp's production resulted in sound that was "bigger, more alive–and often raunchy." Clarke highlighted the instrumentation on several tracks, including the "exemplary boogie-flavored piano work" on "Animal Magic", the tenor saxophone playing from Tim Cappello on "Perspective", and Fripp's guitar solo on "White Shadow".

Music Week said that the album had "settled into slightly self-indulgent rock, but far removed from the art-rock outfits". They also thought that the album lacked songs that were a clear follow-up to "Solsbury Hill", Gabriel's first single from his debut album. Beat Instrumental thought that the album was "wide-ranging both in style and content" with songs "imbued with the maturity and self-assurance of a major talent." Lawrence Kanusher of International Musician and Recording World called the album "mediocre", expressing his belief that most the lyrics were lacking in substance, dismissing the instrumentation as lacking in inspiration, and expressing his opinion that Gabriel's voice failed to handle the ballads effectively.

Record World felt that Gabriel's second album was "more esoteric" than his debut and that "On the Air", "D.I.Y.", and "Perspective" best demonstrated Gabriel's ability to "mix and mesh styles with ease". Billboard labelled the album as "another eclectic art rock effort" from Gabriel and felt that the music was "closer to the edge than what is coming out of Genesis". Cashbox thought that the material on the album was more "unified" than the songs included on Gabriel's first solo release.

== Track listing ==
All tracks are written by Peter Gabriel, with additional writers noted.

Side one
No.	Title	Writer(s)	Length
1.	"On the Air"		5:30
2.	"D.I.Y."		2:37
3.	"Mother of Violence"	Jill Gabriel	3:10
4.	"A Wonderful Day in a One-Way World"		3:33
5.	"White Shadow"		5:14

Side two
No.	Title	Writer(s)	Length
6.	"Indigo"		3:30
7.	"Animal Magic"		3:26
8.	"Exposure"	Robert Fripp	4:12
9.	"Flotsam and Jetsam"		2:17
10.	"Perspective"		3:23
11.	"Home Sweet Home"		4:37

- On original LP pressings of the album, the audio of "White Shadow" (the last song on side one) continued into a locked groove.
- Some editions of the cassette release had a different running order. "A Wonderful Day in a One-Way World" was track 11, "Home Sweet Home" was track 5, and "White Shadow" was track 4.
- The original B-side of the single "D.I.Y." is a longer version of "Perspective" edited for the album and all subsequent releases.

== Personnel ==
=== Musicians ===
- Peter Gabriel – lead vocals, backing vocals (1, 4, 7, 10, 11), piano (2), synthesizer (5, 7), organ (11)
- Robert Fripp – electric guitar (1, 3, 5, 10), acoustic guitar (5), Frippertronics (8)
- Sidney McGinnis – electric guitar (1, 4, 8–11), acoustic guitar (2, 3), mandolin (2), steel guitar (3–6, 9, 11), backing vocals (7)
- Tony Levin – bass (1, 5, 7, 8, 10, 11), Chapman stick (2, 4, 9), string bass (6), recorder arrangements (6, 9), backing vocals (1, 4, 7, 10, 11)
- Roy Bittan – keyboards (1, 3, 5, 6, 10, 11)
- Larry Fast – synthesizer and treatments (1, 2, 5, 7, 10)
- Bayeté – keyboards (2, 4, 6, 7)
- Jerry Marotta – drums (1, 2, 4–11), backing vocals (1, 4, 10, 11)
- Tim Cappello – saxophone (10, 11)
- George Marge – recorder (6, 8, 9)
- John Tims – insects (3)

The electric guitar on track 7 is uncredited.

=== Technical ===
- Produced by Robert Fripp
- Engineered by Steve Short, Ed Sprigg, Michael Getlin, and Steve Tayler
- Assistant engineer (at The Hit Factory) – Michael Ruffo
- Production coordinator – Richard Macphail
- Equipment – Albert Lawrence and David Price
- Cover design and photography – Hipgnosis
- Liner design – Hipgnosis and Colin Elgie
- Management – Tony Smith

== Charts ==
Chart (1978)	Peak position
Australian Albums (Kent Music Report)	50
Canada Top Albums/CDs (RPM)	46
Dutch Albums (Album Top 100)	48
French Albums (SNEP)	2
German Albums (Offizielle Top 100)	49
New Zealand Albums (RMNZ)	24
UK Albums (Official Charts)	10
US Billboard 200	45
