= Modern Love (Peter Gabriel song) =

Single by Peter Gabriel

from the album Peter Gabriel (Car)
- B-side: "Slowburn"
- Released: 17 June 1977
- Recorded: 1976
- Genre: Rock; power pop
- Length: 3:38
- Label: Atco; Charisma
- Songwriter: Peter Gabriel
- Producer: Bob Ezrin

Peter Gabriel singles chronology
"Solsbury Hill" (1977)	"Modern Love" (1977)	"D.I.Y." (1978)

"Modern Love" is a song written and performed by the English rock musician Peter Gabriel. It was released in 1977 as the second single released from his 1977 self-titled album and failed to chart. The song was also performed live on the album's accompanying tour.

== Background ==
During the vocal recording sessions for "Modern Love", producer Bob Ezrin thought that Gabriel's delivery of the line oh the pain, modern love can be a strain sounded "too polite", so he offered the singer three more attempts to sing the line. Once this proved unsuccessful, Ezrin asked engineer Brian Chistian to hoist Gabriel up a ladder and duct-taped his armpits to one of the pillars in the studio. "We rolled the tape and he was up there arms flailing and screaming 'Ahh, the pain, Modern Love' and we got it."

Describing "Modern Love", Gabriel said that it had a "humorous lyric about a romantic in a world of machines." The song's lyrics include sexual innuendos and references to Roman mythology and classical art, including Leonardo da Vinci's Mona Lisa and Sandro Botticelli's The Birth of Venus.

The music video was directed by Peter Medak, who Gabriel selected after watching The Ruling Class. Parts of the music video were filmed at a shopping centre in Shepherd's Bush on moving escalators, which Gabriel thought were "of the future at the time."

== Release ==
In June 1977, "Modern Love" was lifted as the second single from Gabriel's debut solo album with "Slowburn" as the B-side. Radio & Records listed the song at number 19 on its English Airplay chart in the 8 July 1977 edition of the publication. The single did not appear on any all-genre chart that encompassed both sales and airplay. Gabriel had originally wanted to release "Modern Love" as the lead single instead of "Solsbury Hill". When asked by Melody Maker why the single failed to match the commercial performance of "Solsbury Hill", the previous single, Gabriel posited that most people who would have otherwise purchased "Modern Love" already had the song on his first solo album. He said that the BBC was unwilling to promote the single despite a willingness for some radio stations to play it. The artwork on the disc featured Gabriel nude in a Vitruvian Man pose with the spindle hole obscuring his crotch.

The idea was when you put the record on the turntable the little thing in the center gave me generous endowments. I was quite pleased with the idea at the time but it didn't go down very well. I think it joined the long list of misses from my single releases, of which there have been many."

== Critical reception ==
Alan Jones of Melody Maker described "Modern Love" as a "rousing and highly enjoyable" power pop song. He also stated that "Modern Love" was the only song on the album that evoked the previous production work of Bob Ezrin, an observation that Gabriel agreed with. NME complimented the guitars and keyboards on "Modern Love", and quipped that the riff was "strong enough to land Concorde on." Record Mirror called "Modern Love" a "great chunky white rock funker". In its review of Gabriel's debut album, AllMusic characterised Modern Love as a "surging rocker".

== Track listing ==
7" single

1. "Modern Love." – 3:06
2. "Slowburn" – 4:20

== Personnel ==
- Peter Gabriel – lead vocals
- Robert Fripp – electric guitar
- Steve Hunter – electric guitar
- Tony Levin – bass guitar
- Jozef Chirowski – keyboards
- Larry Fast – synthesizers
- Allan Schwartzberg – drums
- Jimmy Maelen – percussion
