= Solsbury Hill =

Iron Age hillfort in Somerset, England

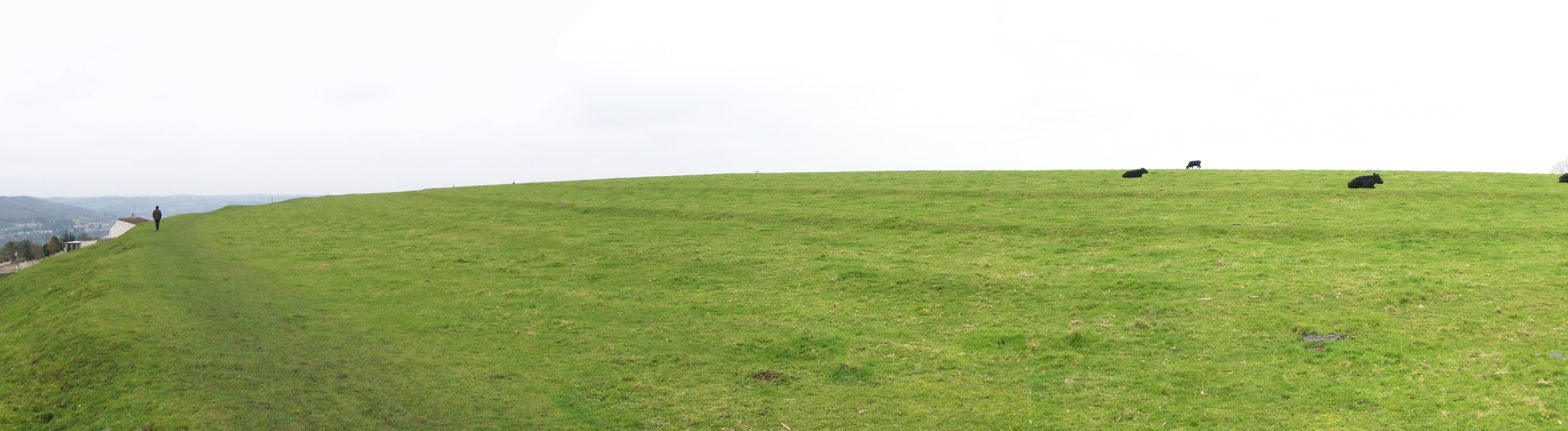
- Panoramic view on top of the hill

- Location within Somerset
- 51°24′36″N 2°20′03″W
- Location: Batheaston in Somerset, England

History
- Built: Iron Age

Site notes
- Governing body: National Trust

Scheduled monument
- Official name: Slight univallate hillfort 190m north west of Westleigh
- Designated: 8 October 1956
- Reference no.: 1002481

Little Solsbury Hill (or simply Solsbury Hill) is a small flat-topped hill and the site of an Iron Age hillfort, above the village of Batheaston in Somerset, England. The hill rises to 191 metres (627 ft) above the River Avon, which is just over 2 kilometres (1 mi) to the south, and gives views of the city of Bath and the surrounding area. It is within the Cotswolds Area of Outstanding Natural Beauty.

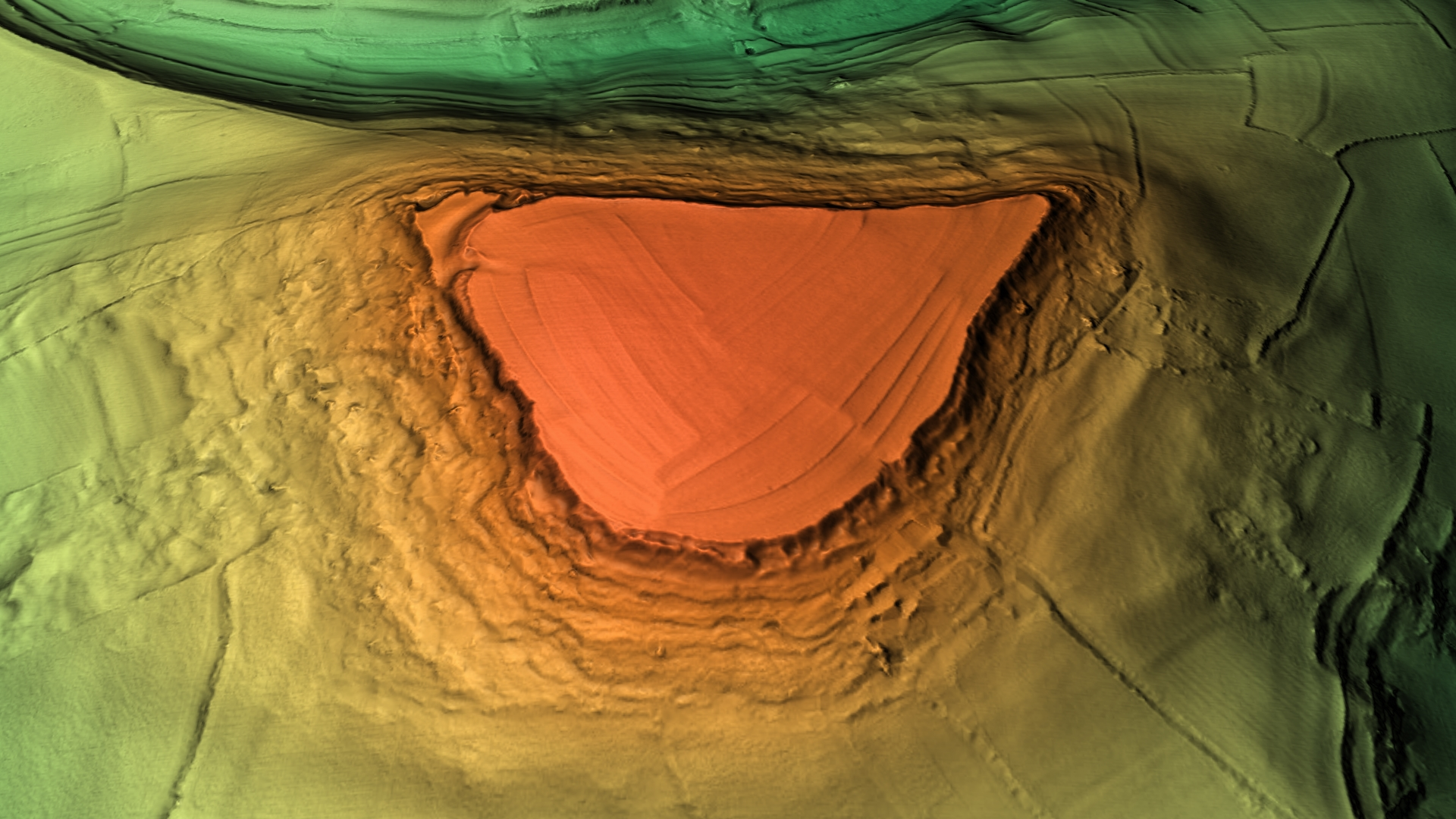
3D view of the digital terrain model

The hill is one of several possible locations of the Battle of Badon and shows the remains of a medieval field system. Part of the hill was quarried in the 19th century. In 1930, it was acquired by the National Trust. The hill was the inspiration of the Peter Gabriel song "Solsbury Hill", recorded in 1977. A small turf labyrinth was cut into the turf by protesters during the widening of the A46 in 1994.

== Etymology ==
It is sometimes misspelled as Salisbury, or Solisbury, perhaps because of confusion with Salisbury Plain (a plateau in southern England), or the city of Salisbury. Salisbury and Solsbury can be difficult to distinguish in speech; Salisbury is often pronounced "Saulsbury", and sometimes the "a" in "Salisbury" is pronounced as an "o", and the "i" is elided, making the pronunciations of the two words practically identical. The name 'Solsbury' may be derived from the Celtic god Sulis, a deity worshipped at the thermal spring in nearby Bath. A geological map by Horace B Woodward in the back of the 1888 Handbook of Bath labels the hill as 'Stilisbury Hill'.

== Geology ==
The hill is formed in layers from a variety of sedimentary rocks of Jurassic age. In common with the Cotswold plateau to the north, the summit is formed from rocks ascribed to the Chalfield Oolite Formation. The oolite, together with the Fuller's Earth Formation which underlies it, forms a part of the Great Oolite Group of rocks of Bathonian age. Beneath these are, successively, Bajocian age limestones of the Inferior Oolite Group and sandstones of the Bridport Sand Formation. The last-named unit forms a part of the Lias Group of rocks of Toarcian age. Beneath all of these is the relatively thick Charmouth Mudstone Formation sequence rising from the edge of the valley floor alluvium. All faces of the hill are subject to large areas of landslip.

The 191 metres (627 ft) high hill is just over 2 kilometres (1 mi) north of the River Avon.

== Hillfort ==
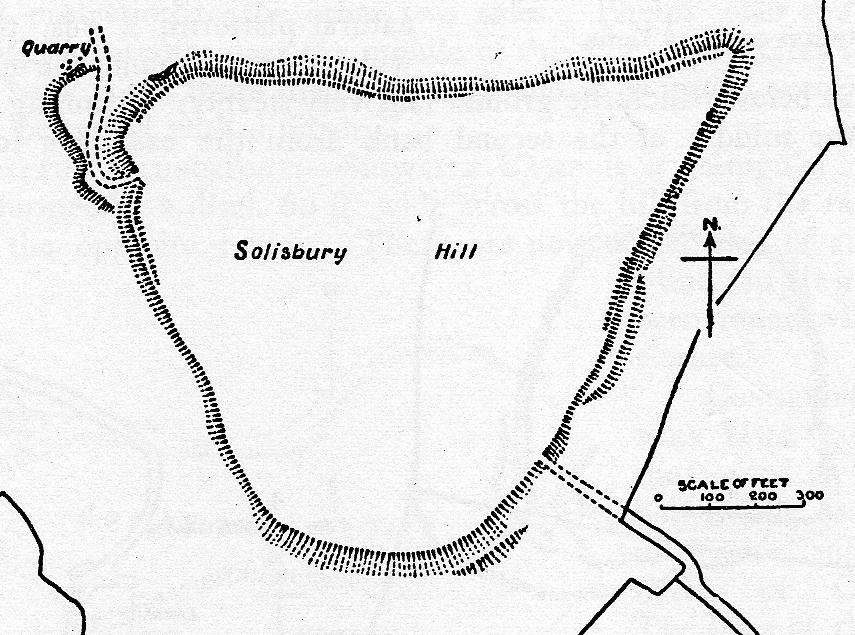
Earthworks at Solsbury Hill

Solsbury Hill was an Iron Age hillfort occupied between 300 BC and 100 BC, comprising a triangular area enclosed by a single univallate rampart, faced inside and out with well-built dry stone walls and infilled with rubble. The rampart was 6 metres (20 ft) wide and the outer face was at least 4 metres (13 ft) high. The top of the hill was cleared down to the bedrock, then substantial huts were built with wattle and daub on a timber frame. After a period of occupation, some of the huts were burnt down, the rampart was overthrown, and the site was abandoned, never to be reoccupied. This event is probably part of the Belgic invasion of Britain in the early part of the 1st century BC.

The hillfort is protected as a scheduled monument.

== Later history ==
The hill is near the Fosse Way Roman Road as it descends Bannerdown hill into Batheaston on its way to Bath. Solsbury Hill is a possible location of the Battle of Badon, fought between the Britons (under the legendary King Arthur) and the Saxons c. 496, mentioned by the chroniclers Gildas and Nennius. The hilltop also shows the remains of a medieval or post medieval field system.

The hill also has two disused quarries, one listed on the northwest side on a 1911 map, and another one listed between 1885 and 1900 as an old quarry on the west side. It was acquired by the National Trust in 1930. People protesting against the building of an A46 bypass road cut a small turf maze into the hill, during the construction of the bypass in the mid-1990s. In one day of protests, 11 people, including George Monbiot, were hospitalised as a result of beatings by the security guards.

== Wildlife ==
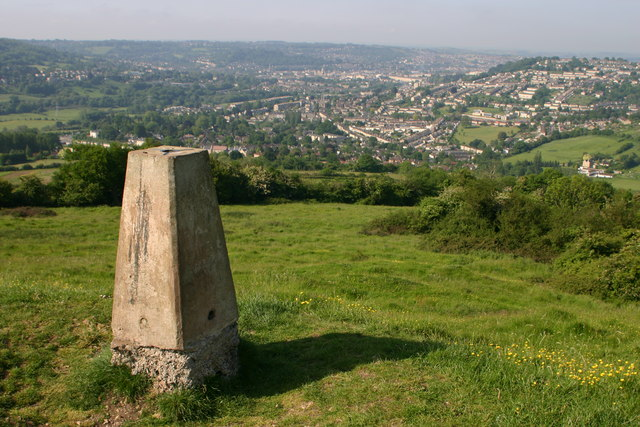
The triangulation pillar on the top of the hill, with the city of Bath in the distance.

The plants and animals that live on Little Solsbury reflect the habitat provided by grassland overlying the limestone rock beneath. Specialist plants and animals, some of which are rare species, have adapted to the calcareous grassland. Most of the landscape is largely unaffected by agriculture as shown by the yellow meadow ant.

Examples of plant species found include bird's foot trefoil, vetches, greater knapweed, harebells, yarrow (Achillea millefolium), and scabious. It is one of a series of flower-rich habitats that Avon Wildlife Trust are trying to link together. The plants attract a range of insects including: the six-spotted burnet moth, hummingbird hawk-moth and a number of butterflies including chalkhill blues. An invertebrate survey by Mike Williams of Bath Natural History Society conducted in 2024 recorded 471 invertebrate species, including three beetle species new to North Somerset. A small population of common buzzard (Buteo buteo) nest in the area. Roe deer (Capreolus capreolus), badger and red fox are seen. Skylarks also nest on the hill.

== In popular culture ==
Solsbury Hill (more accurately 'Little Solsbury') is the inspiration for an eponymous song, released in 1977 by rock musician Peter Gabriel as his first solo single. A recording of the natural sounds on the hill forms the track "A Quiet Moment" on Gabriel's 2011 album New Blood, which precedes the orchestral version of his song.

The Warlord Chronicles, a historical fiction trilogy of books, places the site of Mount Badon at Solsbury Hill.

== See also ==
- List of hillforts and ancient settlements in Somerset
