= Mother of Violence =

Song by Peter Gabriel

from the album Peter Gabriel
- A-side: "D.I.Y"
- Released: 1978
- Length: 3:10
- Label: Charisma
- Songwriters: Peter Gabriel, Jill Gabriel
- Producer: Robert Fripp

"Mother of Violence" is a song recorded by English musician Peter Gabriel, co-written with his then wife Jill Gabriel. The song appeared on his 1978 solo album Peter Gabriel and was also issued as a B-side to the re-release of "D.I.Y", the only single lifted from the album.

== Background ==
Gabriel decided to open "Mother of Violence" with the sound of insects after listening to a wildlife programme on BBC Radio 4. The programme covered a tape recording competition, which among other things, showcased the sounds of clicking insects. Gabriel found these noises appealing and decided to incorporate them into "Mother of Violence". As the song progresses, the cricket chirps are replaced by a buzzing noise, which was achieved through guitar feedback. The insect noises were removed from the single mix of "Mother of Violence", which was one of the B-sides to the September 1978 re-release of "D.I.Y". This mix was later included on Gabriel's 2019 Flotsam and Jetsam compilation album.

Gabriel envisioned a "rural-sounding arrangement" for "Mother of Violence", which he wanted to juxtapose with urban imagery. The song is largely built around piano accompaniment from Roy Bittan and acoustic/pedal steel guitar playing from Sid McGinnis.

The song carries a co-writing credit from Jill Gabriel, who was Peter's wife at the time. The two were members of a local drama group when they created the song, which was intended for a children's Christmas carol at their village church. Jill was responsible for the melody of the Christmas carol, which Peter decided to use on "Mother of Violence". Peter crafted some of the lyrics on a day when he was eating "junk food" and feeling "down" while watching television. Gabriel later acknowledged that he was "very conscious of the P&L (Paul McCartney and Linda McCartney) vibe" with the musical partnership between himself and Jill on the song.

Gabriel remarked in an interview with Steve Clarke of NME that he thought of himself "as an optimist with pessimistic tendencies" and said that he wrote the song on a day where those tendencies had surfaced. He believed that the lyrics reflected the potential for a "negative state of mind" to be exacerbated when exposed to fear propagated on news outlets. For the TV dinner lyric, Gabriel envisioned himself "in periods of depression when moccasin shoes sounded better than bedroom slippers. It's got the image of the American Indian and what's left of him."

== Critical reception ==
In his review of Gabriel's 1978 self-titled album, Steve Clarke of NME described "Mother of Violence" as a "gentle song with acoustic guitar and piano" that capitalised on the more "mellifluous side of [Gabriel's] voice". He also thought that the song's instrumentation concealed its darker and more foreboding lyrics. Also in NME, Nick Kent wrote that Roy Bittan's piano playing on "Mother of Violence" "outstripp[ed] anything he's turned out for either Bruce Springsteen or David Bowie." Uncut also highlighted the piano playing of Bittan, saying that it contributed to the "distinctive texture" on the "airy 'Mother of Violence'". Mick Brown of The Guardian felt that Robert Fripp's production work was effective at demonstrating the subtleties found in the musical arrangement, which Brown described as "chillingly beautiful".

== Live performances ==
Gabriel later performed "Mother of Violence" during his 1978–1979 Scratch tour. For his 14 December show, Lloyd Sachs of Rolling Stone said that Gabriel sang a "rather moving" performance of the song at the foot of the crowd, but believed that he "quickly wasted that mood at the song's conclusion with a series of infantile la la las and a spastic look on his face." On 26 August 1979, he performed the song as a duet with Phil Collins in Reading, Berkshire for the Reeding Festival. Geraldine Brennan of the Bracknell and Ascot Times called this rendition "one of the highlights of the set and even of the weekend."

Bill Provick of the Ottawa Citizen characterised "Mother of Violence" as a "traditional, melodic song" that focused on lyricism and said that Gabriel's live performance of the song in Ottawa was a "pleasing panorama of moods." Writing for The Guardian, Robin Denselow identified "Mother of Violence" as a song in Gabriel's live set that possessed "bleak lyrics". He said that these lyrics "contrasted so strangely with [Gabriel's] boyish, amiable approach". Reviewing his 1978 performance at the Hammersmith Apollo, Tim Lott singled out "Mother of Violence" as a "soft and direct ballad that impressed, simply because Gabriel's voice fits that approach."

In 1980, Gabriel performed the song on his tour promoting his third solo album, where Lynne Hanna of New Musical Express called the rendition "superb", saying that the "childish ululations at the end" were "exquisitely chilling". "Mother of Violence" was later played on Gabriel's 2007 Warm Up Tour, with his daughter Melanie handling lead vocals.

== Brian Eno cover ==
In 2010, Gabriel released an album of orchestral covers titled Scratch My Back, which included a cover of David Bowie's "Heroes". The original concept of this project was to engage in a song exchange where the artists covered on Scratch My Back would return the favour by recording their rendition of a Gabriel composition, which would be released the companion album And I'll Scratch Yours. Bowie ultimately did not contribute to this project, so Brian Eno, who co-wrote "Heroes", tackled this responsibility instead. Eno's planned to cover Gabriel's "In Your Eyes", but then settled on "Mother of Violence" after he ruled out "Don't Break This Rhythm", the B-side to "Sledgehammer". For his rendition, Eno primarily handled the vocal delivery with a spoken word approach.

== Personnel ==
- Peter Gabriel – vocals
- Sid McGinnis – acoustic guitar, pedal steel guitar
- Robert Fripp – electric guitar
- Roy Bittan – keyboards
- John Tims – insects
