= Solsbury Hill (song) =

1977 single by Peter Gabriel

- Original 1977 UK vinyl single

Single by Peter Gabriel

from the album Peter Gabriel (Car)
- B-side: "Moribund the Burgermeister"
- Released: 25 March 1977
- Recorded: 1976
- Studio: The Soundstage, Toronto, Canada
- Genre: Progressive pop; pop rock; folk-pop
- Length: 4:21 (album version); 3:24 (single edit version)
- Label: Atco; Charisma
- Songwriter: Peter Gabriel
- Producer: Bob Ezrin

Peter Gabriel singles chronology
"Solsbury Hill" (1977)	"Modern Love" (1977)

Music video
- Peter Gabriel – "Solsbury Hill" on YouTube

"Solsbury Hill" is the debut solo single by the English rock musician Peter Gabriel and the first single from his 1977 self-titled album. He wrote the song about a spiritual experience atop Solsbury Hill in Somerset, England, after his departure from the progressive rock band Genesis, of which he had been the lead vocalist since its inception. The single was a Top 20 hit in the UK, peaking at number 13. It reached number 68 on the Billboard Hot 100 chart in 1977.

Gabriel has said of the song's meaning: "It's about being prepared to lose what you have for what you might get ... It's about letting go."

== Composition ==
"Solsbury Hill" is mostly written in 7/4 time, an unusual time signature that has been described as "giving the song a constant sense of struggle". The meter settles into 4/4 time only for the last two measures of each chorus. It is performed in the key of B major with a tempo of 102 beats per minute, with Gabriel's vocals ranging from F♯_{3} to G♯_{4}.

The song originally had seven different sections, but producer Bob Ezrin helped Gabriel pare it down to a shorter length. Gabriel began the song with the main riff on the piano and later developed the rhythmic pattern part on the lower registers of the keyboard. He then worked on some additional chords, including the part that appeared at the end of each chorus. The lyrics were written late in the songwriting process; he had attempted a few different sets of words that he later discarded, including the line "stress, you got me in a mess".

In a 1977 interview with Barbara Charone, Gabriel said that "Solsbury Hill" was almost omitted from the album. Ezrin attributed this to his dislike of the original final line of the chorus, which was "make your life a taxi not a tomb." He said that the song "was not going on the record until we found the proper last line." Several alternative lyrics were attempted, including "does anyone here know Officer Muldoon?"; the two also considered backmasking "fool, you've got the record on backwards." During the final day of mixing, Gabriel changed the line to "grab your things I've come to take you home", which Ezrin accepted. Gabriel ultimately expressed satisfaction with the song, placing particular attention on its time signature: "that 7/4 rhythm works well because it feels like a normal rhythm but isn't quite right...If it's a hit, it'll be interesting to see how people dance to it."

== Recording ==
Recorded at The Soundstage in Toronto, "Solsbury Hill" was the final song recorded for the album. By the time the guitars were recorded, Robert Fripp had returned to London and was unavailable to participate; all of the guitars on the song were played by Steve Hunter. Fripp later wrote that he had "nothing to add to the track after Steve's superb & fitting contribution, although I would love to be on it."

While earlier versions of the song featured more prominent electric guitar, Ezrin instructed Hunter to perform the main riff on an acoustic twelve-string guitar, an instrument "he hadn't played in a long time". However, Hunter stated that he instead borrowed a Martin six-string acoustic guitar. He Travis picked the part with a capo on the guitar's second fret after coordinating with Ezrin and Gabriel on a suitable part to play. Ezrin wanted the acoustic guitar to be triple-tracked, so Hunter overdubbed three takes of the part.

Ezrin removed drummer Allan Schwartzberg's cymbals and placed a shaker in one of his hands and a drum stick in another, which he used to strike a telephone directory. For additional rhythmic textures, Larry Fast designed a drum sound on a synthesiser (which he dubbed the "synthibam"), which was played by percussionist Jimmy Maelen. After the other session musicians departed, Fast overdubbed some additional synthesiser parts. He gravitated toward a sound resembling a French horn, which he deemed to be suitable accompaniment for the acoustic guitars. A four-note riff played by Gabriel on flute and Fast on synthesiser prefaces each line of the lyrics.

== Critical reception ==
NME described "Solsbury Hill" as the "most overtly personal song on the album", adding that "its simple and infectious melody" evinced that Gabriel's departure from Genesis "was like having the proverbial weight lifted from his shoulders." Writing for Melody Maker, Caroline Coon also gave the song a positive review, writing that "its beautifully syncopated rhythm is utterly addictive." She singled out praise for Ezrin's production and the song's "perfectly developed riff." Beat Instrumental labelled "Solsbury Hill" as the best song on the album, along with "Humdrum".

Billboard wrote that the song "has a contagious beat that improves and picks up with intensity." Cash Box believed that the song's "lighthearted feeling should go a long way in expanding [Gabriel's] audience beyond the boundaries of so-called 'Progressive Rock.'" Record World said that "the folk flavored song has an interesting electronic undercurrent" and felt that the single version was "intelligently edited". Rolling Stone critic Stephen Demorest called "Solsbury Hill" "a superior, lilting soft-pop tune that conveys the album's most autobiographical message."

In 2021, "Solsbury Hill" was listed at No. 472 on that year's edition of Rolling Stone's 500 Greatest Songs of All Time.

== Use in soundtracks ==
The song has been used in a number of films and television shows, including the 2001 film Vanilla Sky and the 2004 film In Good Company. It has also been used in the trailer of Finding Dory (2016), and at the end of the series finale of Halt and Catch Fire. It was also used for the conclusion of an episode of Fox's 9-1-1. It has appeared in television advertisements for Cingular Wireless, Toyota, and Nespresso. Its prevalence in romantic comedy film trailers has been called "ubiquitous", leading to its inclusion in a satirical re-cut trailer for The Shining (1980).

== Track listing ==
=== Studio recording ===
"Solsbury Hill"
- 7-inch vinyl edition

Single by Peter Gabriel

from the album Peter Gabriel (Car) and Shaking the Tree
- B-side: "Shaking the Tree" (new vocal remix); "Games Without Frontiers"
- Released: 3 December 1990
- Length: 4:21
- Label: Geffen; Virgin
- Songwriter: Peter Gabriel

Peter Gabriel singles chronology
"Shakin' the Tree" (1989)	"Solsbury Hill" (1990)	"Digging in the Dirt" (1992)

7" UK single (1977)

1. "Solsbury Hill" – 3:24
2. "Moribund the Burgermeister" – 4:17

7" "Old Gold" single (1982)

1. "Solsbury Hill" – 3:26
2. "Games Without Frontiers" – 3:50

UK maxi-single (1983, 1988)

1. "Solsbury Hill" – 3:24
2. "Moribund the Burgermeister" – 4:17
3. "Solsbury Hill" (full-length live version) – 5:45

European single (1990 re-issue)

1. "Solsbury Hill" – 4:24 / 4:22
2. "Shaking the Tree" – 5:06
3. "Games Without Frontiers" (live) – 6:06

=== Live version ===
"Solsbury Hill" (Live)

Single by Peter Gabriel

from the album Plays Live
- B-side: "Kiss of Life" (live)
- Released: August 1983 (US)
- Length: 4:41
- Label: Geffen; Charisma
- Songwriter: Peter Gabriel

Peter Gabriel singles chronology
"I Have the Touch" (1982)	"Solsbury Hill" (Live) (1983)	"Walk Through the Fire" (1984)

7" US single (1983)

1. "Solsbury Hill" (live) – 3:58
2. "I Go Swimming" (live) – 4:29

7" Netherlands single (1983)

1. "Solsbury Hill" (live) – 4:41
2. "Kiss of Life" (live) – 5:01

7" US single (1983)

1. "Solsbury Hill" (live) – 3:58
2. "Shock the Monkey" – 3:58

== Personnel ==
- Peter Gabriel – vocals, flute
- Steve Hunter – acoustic guitar, electric guitar
- Tony Levin – bass guitar
- Larry Fast – synthesiser
- Allan Schwartzberg – drums, shaker, telephone book
- Jimmy Maelen – "synthibam" (synthesised percussion)
- London Symphony Orchestra

== Charts ==
Chart (1977)	Peak position
Australia (Kent Music Report)	45
Belgium (Wallonia)	17
Canada Top Singles (RPM)	92
Germany (Official German Charts)	16
Netherlands (Dutch Top 40)	11
UK Singles (Official Charts Company)	13
US Billboard Hot 100	68

== Certifications ==
Region	Certification	Certified units/sales
New Zealand (RMNZ)	2× Platinum	60,000^{‡}
United Kingdom (BPI)	Platinum	600,000^{‡}
^{‡} Sales+streaming figures based on certification alone.

== Erasure version ==
"Solsbury Hill"

Single by Erasure

from the album Other People's Songs
- B-side: "Tell It to Me"; "Searching"; "Ave Maria"
- Released: 6 January 2003
- Length: 3:57
- Label: Mute
- Songwriter: Peter Gabriel
- Producers: Gareth Jones; Erasure

Erasure singles chronology
"Moon & the Sky" (2001)	"Solsbury Hill" (2003)	"Make Me Smile (Come Up and See Me)" (2003)

Music video
- Erasure – "Solsbury Hill" on YouTube

"Solsbury Hill" was covered by English synth-pop duo Erasure in 2003 for their cover album Other People's Songs and released as a single in the United Kingdom on 6 January 2003. The single reached No. 10 on the UK Singles Chart, No. 7 in Denmark, No. 29 in Germany, No. 39 in Sweden, and No. 41 in Ireland. The track was chosen for the album by Erasure member Vince Clarke.

Clarke and lead vocalist Andy Bell turned the song into a mid-tempo electronic dance tune, displaying the signature Erasure sound. The band changed the structure of the song from the original 7/4 time signature to 4/4—except for the chorus, which slips back into 7/4 time for one line. This also results in the vocals in the verses effectively being shifted forward in comparison to Gabriel's (which start on beat 5 of each bar) to start on beat 1 of bars 1 and 3.

Clarke directed a music video for the cover which was released on Erasure's DVD compilation Hits! the Videos.

=== Track listings ===
CD Single No. 1 (CDMUTE275)

1. "Solsbury Hill"
2. "Tell It to Me"
3. "Searching"

CD Single No. 2 (LCDMUTE275)

1. "Solsbury Hill" (37B mix)
2. "Solsbury Hill" (Manhattan Clique extended remix)
3. "Ave Maria"

DVD Single (DVDMUTE275)

1. "Solsbury Hill" (radio mix)
2. "Video Killed the Radio Star"
3. "Dr Jeckyll and Mistress Hyde" (short film)

US CD Maxi Single (9200–2)

1. "Solsbury Hill" (radio mix)
2. "Solsbury Hill"
3. "Tell It to Me"
4. "Searching"
5. "Video Killed the Radio Star" (37B mix)
6. "Solsbury Hill" (37B mix)
7. "Solsbury Hill" (Manhattan Clique extended remix)
8. "Ave Maria"
9. "Dr. Jeckyll and Mistress Hyde" (short film)

=== Charts ===
==== Weekly charts ====
Chart (2003)	Peak position
Denmark (Tracklisten)	7
Germany (GfK)	29
Ireland (IRMA)	41
Scottish Singles Sales (Official Charts)	13
Sweden (Sverigetopplistan)	39
UK Singles (Official Charts)	10
UK Independent (Official Charts)	2
US Dance Singles Sales (Billboard)	2

==== Year-end charts ====
Chart (2003)	Position
US Dance Singles Sales (Billboard)	21

== Other cover versions ==
In 2013, an instrumental version of "Solsbury Hill" was included on Steve Hunter's studio album The Manhattan Blues Project, featuring bassist Tony Levin (who had also played on the original recording).

In 1991, Canadian progressive rock band Saga released a cover of "Solsbury Hill" on their greatest hits compilation The Works.

In 2020, Serbian and Yugoslav rock band Jakarta included a Serbian language cover, entitled "Selo Banja" ("Village Banja"), on their album Letim (I'm Flying).

In 2025, Australian singer-songwriter Sia released a cover of "Solsbury Hill" for Humane World for Animals.
