= Barbara Charone =

American journalist and music critic

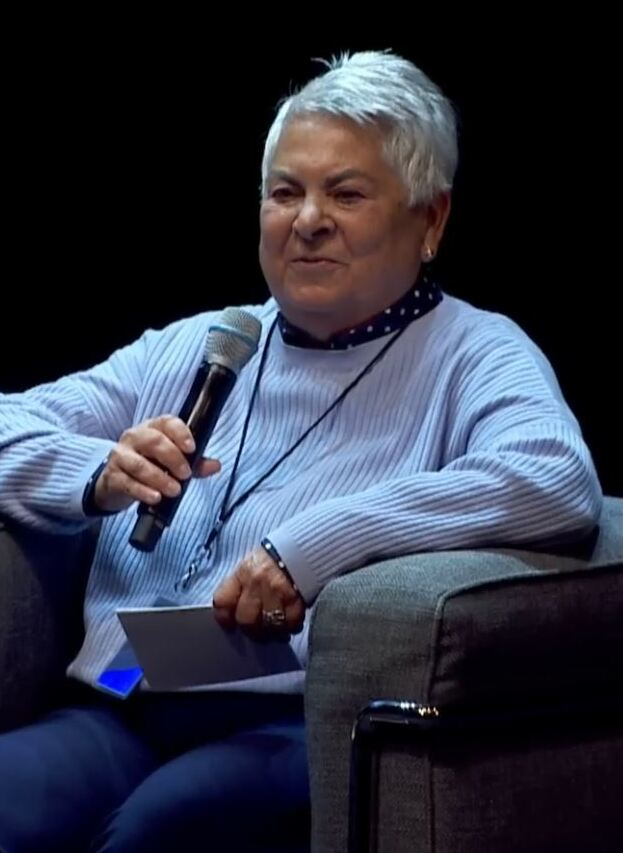
- Charone in 2022
- Born: 1952 (age 73–74)

Barbara Charone is a UK-based American public relations officer for musical artists, a board member of Chelsea F.C., and a former journalist and music critic. She wrote regularly for the Chicago Sun-Times, the NME and Rolling Stone while still a university student in the early 1970s. After relocating to England in 1974, she worked as a staff writer for Sounds magazine, where she subsequently rose to the position of deputy editor. During the 1970s she also contributed feature articles and reviews to publications such as Crawdaddy!, Creem and Circus.

Charone commenced her career in public relations at WEA in 1981. She left in 2000, having become the company's press director, to co-found the agency MBC PR. Her clients at MBC have included Madonna, Depeche Mode, Primal Scream, Robert Plant, Pearl Jam, Rod Stewart and Christina Aguilera. Charone is also the author of an authorized biography of Keith Richards, published in 1979.

== Early life and education ==
Barbara Charone was born in March 1952, and grew up in Chicago, Illinois. She wrote a pop music column for her high school newspaper before going on to study English at Northwestern University. In 1971, at the end of her first year of university, she visited England with her parents, an occasion that initiated a lifelong attachment to the UK. She recalls seeing the Who perform on the BBC television show Top of the Pops and thinking, "What a great country."

During her second year at Northwestern, Charone wrote music articles for the Chicago Sun-Times. She then lived in England for a year on a student exchange program, during which she studied creative writing with the film critic from Time Out and began contributing to the New Musical Express. While completing her Bachelor of Arts degree at Northwestern, in 1974, she also became a freelance writer for Rolling Stone. She recalls that her first major piece for the magazine was a cover article on Rod Stewart. That year, her reviews also appeared in the NME and Zoo World.

== Career ==
=== Music journalism ===
Speaking in 2009, Charone cited her writing for the Chicago Sun-Times while a teenager as the most important break for her career as a music journalist, since it led to Rolling Stone also accepting her as a freelancer. Charone moved permanently to the UK in the autumn of 1974. She worked as a staff writer for Sounds magazine, in addition to making freelance contributions to Rolling Stone, Crawdaddy!, Creem, Hit Parader and ZigZag through to late 1975. During her three-and-a-half years with Sounds she was promoted to features editor, and finally to deputy editor of the magazine. The music website The Quietus describes her report for Sounds on the Rolling Stones' 1976 UK tour as a "classic feature".

A longtime fan of the Rolling Stones, Charone befriended Keith Richards and the latter's common law wife, Anita Pallenberg, following their arrest in Toronto in February 1977, when Richards was charged with intent to traffic heroin. She spent the next two years working on an authorized biography of the Stones' guitarist and songwriter, during which she was afforded rare access to the couple's private life at Richards' Redlands estate. Titled Keith Richards, the book was published in 1979 by Futura.

Between 1977 and 1979, Charone's freelance articles and reviews appeared in Creem and Circus. Following the publication of the Richards biography, she says she was reluctant to resume her job as a music critic but continued working as a freelance journalist until 1981.

=== Publicity and public relations ===
Charone began a career in publicity and public relations when she joined WEA, or Warner Music, in 1981. She initially wrote biographical and news items on the many artists signed to the label; later, she became head of the company's press department, a position she held for thirteen years, until 2000. In addition to representing acts she had known from her time as a music journalist, including Rod Stewart and Eric Clapton, Charone was an early champion of Madonna before the latter achieved international fame. Charone has also cited Seal's elevation to stardom as a satisfying result in her PR career.

In November 2000, Charone co-founded the public relations company MBC PR with Moira Bellas, her former boss at Warner Music. A year later, as joint directors of MBC, she and Bellas were recognized as Nordoff-Robbins Music Therapy/Brit Trust "Women of the Year". The agency's clients have included musical artists such as Madonna, R.E.M., Robert Plant, Christina Aguilera, Anastacia, Cher, Primal Scream, Depeche Mode, Simply Red, Pearl Jam, Stereophonics, Rufus Wainwright, Rod Stewart, Elvis Costello, Lenny Kravitz and Keith Richards, together with comedians David Walliams, Graham Norton and Russell Brand.

Charone won the Music Week Press Award in 2006 and 2009. In June 2008, The Guardian included her on its list of "The 20 most powerful celebrity makers". The newspaper dubbed Charone "Britain's most powerful music PR", citing the recent campaigns in which she had helped revitalize the careers of Madonna and Neil Diamond and establish those of Duffy and Mark Ronson. On July 22, 2022, Charone was appointed to the Chelsea F.C. board of directors.
