= Todd Cochran =

American pianist (born 1951)

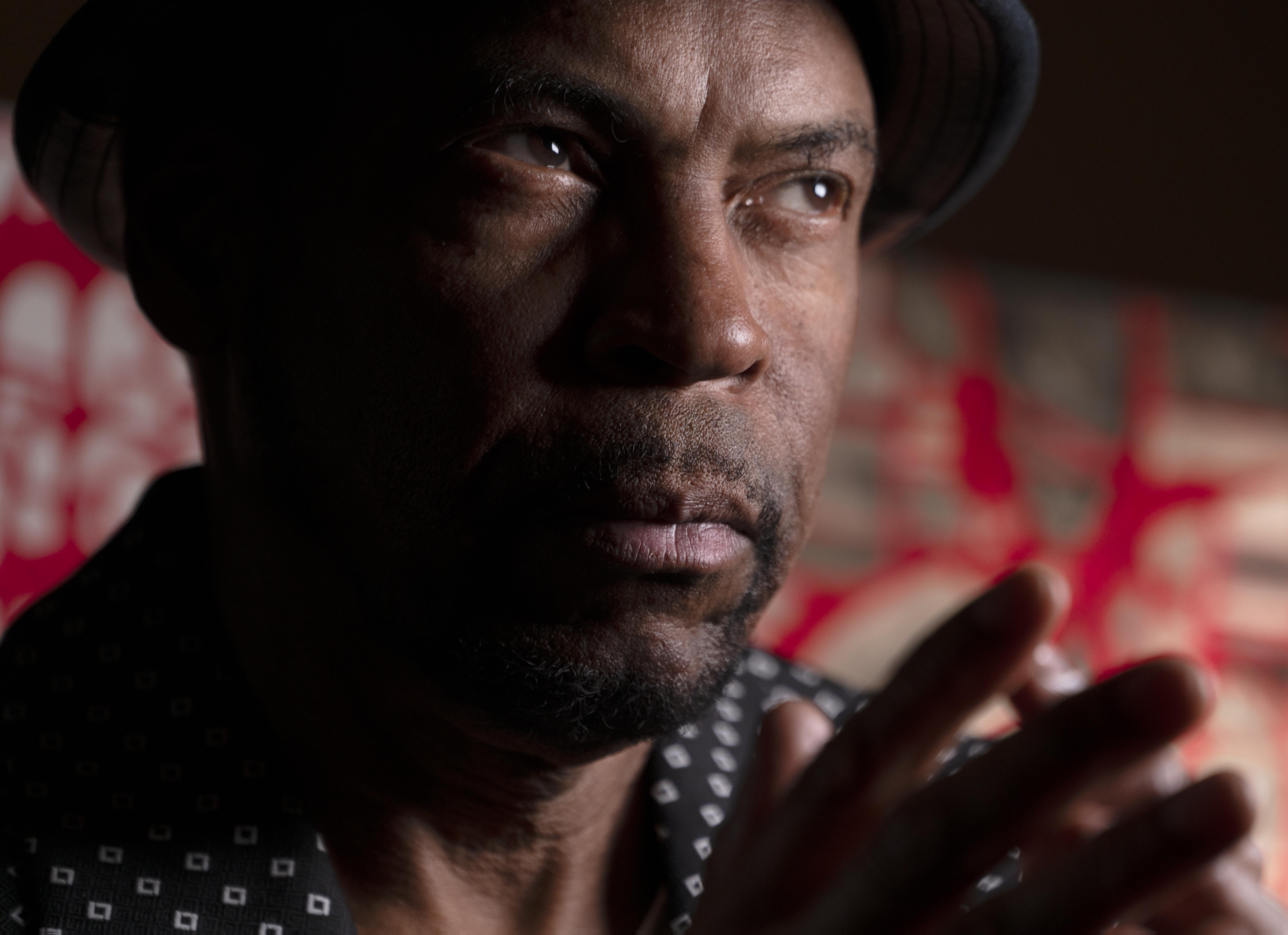

Background information
- Born: 3 September 1951 (age 75); San Francisco, California, U.S.
- Genres: Jazz; contemporary classical; jazz fusion; art rock; progressive pop; avant-garde
- Occupations: Musician; bandleader; composer; producer
- Instruments: Piano; keyboards
- Years active: 1969 - present
- Labels: Fantasy-Prestige; Island; BMG; Atlantic; Sony; CBS; Omnivore; Sunnyside
- Website: www.toddcochran.com

Todd Cochran (born September 3, 1951) is an American pianist, composer, keyboardist, essayist, and conceptual artist. Early in his career he was also professionally known as Bayeté. Cochran started his career as a teenager with saxophonist John Handy. Two years later he joined vibraphonist Bobby Hutcherson’s Quartet, and made his jazz recording debut composing and performing on a benchmark album for Hutcherson, "Head On" (on Blue Note Records) that featured a nineteen-piece ensemble. The recording was critically hailed as cross-pollinating the evolving contemporary modal jazz, avant-garde sound of the 1970s. Cochran’s first solo project "Worlds Around the Sun" became a #1 jazz album and marked his entree into the jazz discussion. From the mid-1970s forward Todd has experimented with and incorporated synthesizers, electronic and mixed-media concepts in his creative projects while collaborating with a wide range of artists in the genres of jazz, art rock, pop, R&B, and twenty-first-century classical.

Cochran's best-known jazz compositions include "At The Source" (Bobby Hutcherson), "Free Angela" (Bayeté Todd Cochran, Santana), "Eternal Worlds" Julian Priester, "My Pearl", "Geni-Geni" (Automatic Man), "Monte Carlo Nights" Grover Washington Jr., "Spanish Rose", "Back To Lovin' Again" (Freddie Hubbard), and "Secret Places" (Todd Cochran).

He released two albums on Prestige Records in 1972 and 1973. He was keyboardist and lead singer of Automatic Man from 1976 - 1978. He was also a member of Fuse One, a coalition of jazz musicians who released two albums on CTI Records in 1980 and 1981.

== Youth ==
Pianist and composer Todd Cochran was born in San Francisco As a child, there never was a time when music or conversations about art or culture were not occurring in the household. Gaining a natural sense of the importance of the arts came with this childhood exposure. Along with the early passion Todd exhibited for the piano he benefitted from his family's devoted love of attending live music and art performances that extended across the spectrum: chamber music, jazz, dance, plays, and religious concerts. With his father he enjoyed going to sports. However, listening to recordings, watching documentary films, and reading were at the heart of his youth and teenage years.

His later education meant that his fundamental orientation to the piano and performing arts was classical music and theory. At around age 14 he was exposed to jazz. He was transfixed by the music and the notion of playing it captivated his imagination. By his mid-teens, Todd had become consumed by music. While continuing to study classical music and theory, learning to play jazz and the communal experience of making creative music and improvisation captivated him.

== Early years ==
Cochran's musical development was impacted by the cultural, political, and community atmosphere of the civil rights movement. Shifting attitudes made for a mélange of possibilities and directions to pursue. At 17, during the highpoint of psychedelic San Francisco, Cochran's joining saxophonist John Handy's band solidified his commitment to jazz.

Soon thereafter he began his mentor relationship and friendship with New Zealand jazz pianist Mike Nock – known for his work with wind multi-instrumentalist, and composer Yusef Lateef. It was after filling in at the keyboards of Nock's band The Fourth Way in a performance at Bill Graham’s Fillmore West (San Francisco) that he began to attract the attention of the jazz community. A musical connection with vibraphonist Bobby Hutcherson ensued. Several years of playing in Hutcherson’s quartet led to Cochran's entrée into the world of recording, with Cochran composing, arranging, and playing on Hutcherson’s album Head On. Cochran was also a member of Hutcherson’s co-led quintet with trumpeter Woody Shaw.

Cochran's work with Bobby Hutcherson led to meeting Duke Pearson (pianist, arranger, producer) who encouraged his interest in recording. From there he composed four pieces and played keyboards on the album Iapetus with saxophonist Hadley Caliman. Later came the live album Intensity with saxophonist John Klemmer.

=== aka Bayeté Todd Cochran ===
An evolving sense of what Cochran wanted to do musically precipitated a more conscious and focused creative impulse and changing his name to “Bayeté.” (Pronounced: by-yet-tāy)

=== Worlds Around The Sun ===
Cochran’s first solo album Worlds Around the Sun featured his composition "Free Angela" – written as an homage to Angela Davis, which was later recorded by Santana. It has been widely sampled by hip-hop artists. Cochran’s "Free Angela" along with Rolling Stone’s “Sweet Black Angel” and John Lennon and Yoko Ono’s “Angela” is discussed in the book “Listen Whitey” by author, culture historian, and music reissue producer Pat Thomas. Worlds Around The Sun was reissued on the Omnivore label (2014). Cochran also composed the score for a documentary film about Angela Davis, Ain’t It Slick by Independent filmmaker/director Francisco Newman. A second, more experimental, and transitional solo album for Prestige, Seeking Other Beauty followed.

Also elaborating on the zeitgeist of the period was the composition "Eternal Worlds" that Cochran (aka Bayeté) wrote and was the pianist for trombonist Julian Priester’s album Love, Love (ECM).

== Automatic Man and Art Rock ==
Cochran’s early career in the Bay Area jazz scene was influenced by a trend of blending genres and crossing traditional boundaries. This environment led him to explore avant-garde and freeform music, marked by spontaneous improvisations. His compositions evolved into simpler structures that incorporated electric keyboards and synthetic sounds, creating pieces that explored atmospheric and conceptual themes.

Collaboration became a key part of Cochran’s approach, adapting to diverse roles across projects. His partnership with Michael Shrieve of Santana led to the formation of Automatic Man, along with guitarist, Pat Thrall and bassist Doni Harvey. Automatic Man was a band known for its fusion of rock and jazz elements, which developed a lasting underground following. This project, recorded in London, introduced Cochran to the progressive rock scene, where he worked with artists including Jim Capaldi (Traffic), Bill Bruford (Yes), Phil Collins’ fusion band, Brand X, and The Real Thing.

Back in Los Angeles, Cochran recorded Automatic Man’s second album, Visitors, with new members Jerome Rimson and Glenn Symmonds. He later returned to England to join Peter Gabriel’s band; touring, and additionally recording on the Robert Fripp. Cochran’s tenure in London concluded with a role in “PM,” a group formed with Carl Palmer of Emerson, Lake and Palmer.

== Filmography ==
YEARS	TITLE	DIRECTOR	STUDIO	NOTES
2014	Rock N' Roll Stories	Tom Waldman	PBS	artist spotlight (TV Series)
2011	Water For Elephants	Francis Lawrence	Fox 2000 Pictures	actor in 'Speakeasy Jazz Band'
2008	The Lena Baker Story	Ralph Wilcox	American World Pictures	
2008	Love and Other 4 Letter Words	Steven Ayromlooi	Independent	
2007	Toussaint L’Ouverture – The Heartbeat of Freedom	Doug McHenry	Elephant Walk	featuring Danny Glover and Wyclef Jean
2006	Woman Thou Art Loosed	Michael Shultz	Magnolia Pictures	adaptation of TD Jakes bestseller
2004	Fatherhood	Jamie Mitchell	Nickelodeon	
2002	Keep The Faith, Baby (Adam Clayton Powell story)	Doug McHenry	Showtime	Jazz Score Adam Clayton Powell's wife: pianist Hazel Scott
2001	Return To Castle Wolfenstein	Drew Markham	Gray Matter/Activision	million selling video game
2000	The Hurricane*	Norman Jewison	Universal	Jazz Score Denzil Washington Academy Award Nomination
2007	Trumpet Awards 2007	Will Harper	TV One	
2007	Touch The Sky	National Football League Theme	Fox Sports	
2007	Macbeth	Steve Marvel	The Lillian Theatre	Live theatre stage production
1999	The Best Man*	Malcolm Lee	Universal	
1999	The Marciano Story*	Charles Winkler	Showtime	
1998	40 Year History Of The Monterey Jazz Festival	Will Harper	Malpaso Pictures	Producer: Clint Eastwood
1997	Sprung*	Rusty Cundieff	TriMark	
1996	Waynehead	Grant Moran	Warner Bros.	TV Series
1995	Arts Illustrated	Various	PBS	Theme song
1991	Five Heartbeats*	Robert Townsend	20th Century Fox	
1989	Cat Chaser*	Abel Ferrara	Vestron Pictures	Jazz Score by Chick Corea, additional music Todd Cochran
1973	The Spook Who Sat Behind The Door* (1)	Ivan Dixon	United Artists	Jazz Score by Herbie Hancock, keyboards Todd Cochran
1973	Ain't Nobody Slick (Angela Davis Documentary)	Francisco Newman	Independent	Angela Davis

*Additional Music/Arranging/Performing

(1) "The Spook Who Sat Behind The Door" in 2012 named to the National Film Registry as a work of enduring importance to American culture. Sept. 18, 2020 New York Film Festival

== Discography (selected) ==
=== As solo artist ===
- 1972: Worlds Around the Sun (Prestige) 2014: Reissue (Omnivore)
- 1973: Seeking Other Beauty (Prestige)
- 1991: TODD (Vital)
- 1997: Secret Places (Sony BMG)
- 1998: Melrose Place Soundtrack, She Is Gentle Rain (Sony BMG)
- 1999: A Voice In The Forest, Colour Naturelle (Natural Color) (Sony BMG)

=== As collaborator ===
- 1971: Intensity - John Klemmer
- 1972: Head On - Bobby Hutcherson
- 1972: Iapetus - Hadley Caliman
- 1974: Love, Love - Julian Priester
- 1975: Rebirth Cycle - James Mtume
- 1976: Automatic Man - Automatic Man
- 1976: You to Me Are Everything - The Real Thing
- 1977: Visitors - Automatic Man
- 1977: Spellbound - Alphonso Johnson
- 1978: Peter Gabriel - Peter Gabriel
- 1979: Slug Line - John Hiatt
- 1979: I Wanna Play for You - Stanley Clarke
- 1979: Betcha - Stanley Turrentine
- 1979: Touching You, Touching Me - Airto Moreira
- 1980: 1:PM - PM
- 1980: Aretha - Aretha Franklin
- 1980: Fuse One - Fuse One
- 1981: America's Greatest Hero - Joey Scarbury
- 1982: H.A.T.E. Don't Live Here Anymore - Staple Singers
- 1982: Hollywood - Maynard Ferguson
- 1983: Home Again - Stanley Turrentine
- 1984: Sunrise - Paulinho Da Costa
- 1985: Put Sunshine in It – Arthur Blythe
- 1986: Headed For The Future - Neil Diamond
- 1987: Strawberry Moon - Grover Washington Jr.
- 1988: Out of Control - Dynasty
- 1989: Through The Moving Window - Juan Martin
- 1989: Times Are Changing - Freddie Hubbard
- 1991: Animal Logic II - Animal Logic
- 1993: Now and Then - Ernestine Anderson
- 1995: What´s Inside - Joan Armatrading
- 2000: The Friends - Fishbone
- 2004: Trios: East River Drive/Schooldays/Live at the Greek - Stanley Clarke
- 2005: Blue Note Plays Sting - Freddie Hubbard
- 2005: Robbery - Teena Marie
- 2005: Very Best of George Howard - George Howard
- 2007: Moodo Records Presents Guitarra de Pasion, Vol. 3 - Juan Carlos Quintero
- 2008: Believe It or Not: The Billy Griffin Collection - Billy Griffin

== Additional References ==
Peter Gabriel by Armando Gallo p. 21, © Omnibus Press 1986

The Universal Tone - Bringing My Story to Light by Carlos Santana with Ashley Kahn and Hal Miller p. 356 Little, Brown and Company © 2014

Listen Whitey - The Sights and Sounds of Black Power 1965 - 1975 by Pat Thomas p. 102 Fantagraphics Books © 2012

Meeting Vibraphone Jazz 'Head On' by Kevin Whitehead Fresh Air NPR September 9, 2008

Todd Cochran on the Oberheim Four Voice by Bob Moog, Keyboard Magazine, p. 117 December 1989

Between Sound and Space: ECM Records and Beyond Julian Priester: Love Love by Tyran Grillo July 2012

100 Greatest Jazz Albums, Bobby Hutcherson - Head On Blue Note Re-release (with added tracks): May 13, 2008

But Not Forgotten – Music by African-American composers for Clarinet & Piano, Marcus Eley (clarinet) "Soul-Bird" composed by Todd Cochran CD Review: MusicWeb-International (UK)

Apples, Oranges, and Arthur Blythe from In The Moment by Francis Davis p. 188 Oxford University Press, 1986

A Perfect Sense of Ensemble Cue Newspaper National Arts Festival Marcus Eley, Soul-Bird Grahamtown South Africa, Monday, July 6, 2009

Omnivore Spotlights Worlds Around The Sun Re-issue The Second Disc theseconddisc.com January 15, 2014

Bayeté Todd Cochran Worlds Around The Sun Review by Brian Greene It's Psychedelic Baby! Magazine, January 29, 2014

Bayeté Todd Cochran Worlds Around The Sun Review by Steve Maxwell Von Braund, The Boomerang Wire www.thewire.co.uk March 2014

Creative Music and other forms of Avant Garde- Jazz Weekly March 17, 2014

Jazz Greats Jaco Pastorius And Bayeté Revisit Their Best Albums JP'S Music Blog Record-Journal April 1, 2014

JazzWax by Marc Myers Marc Myerswrites daily on jazz legends and legendary jazz recordings Bayeté—Worlds Around the Sun (Omnivore) April 11, 2014

JFS #177 The Bayete Todd Cochran Interview | Jake Feinberg Show June 8, 2014

Cash Box by David Bowling Worlds Around The Sun by Bayeté Todd Cochran Sunday May 25, 2014

Black Power Jazz Revisited London Evening Standard U.K. by Alastair McKay Uncut Magazine Worlds Around The Sun by Bayeté Todd Cochran July 2014

The Spy Movie That Upset the American Dream (The Spook Who Sat Behind The Door) by J. Hoberman The New York Times September 18, 2020

The Spook Who Sat Behind The Door - 2012 National Film Registry

Clarinet Works by Black Composers The Clarinet International Clarinet Association, December 2020
