= Sid McGinnis =

American musician and guitarist (born 1949)

- Born: Sid McGinnis; October 6, 1949 (age 76)
- Origin: Pittsburgh, Pennsylvania, United States
- Genres: Rock, pop rock
- Occupations: Musician, guitarist
- Instrument: Guitar
- Years active: 1975–present

Sidney Foster McGinnis (born October 6, 1949) is an American musician and guitarist, best known for his work on the CBS television show Late Show with David Letterman, as part of the CBS Orchestra.

He made his first appearance in the Late Night with David Letterman band in 1984 as a guest guitarist, and continued as a permanent guitarist with Letterman's television shows until Letterman's retirement.

McGinnis has also toured and/or recorded with numerous artists, including Warren Zevon, Ashford and Simpson, Barry Manilow, Peter Gabriel, Carly Simon, Dire Straits, Robert Fripp's Exposure album, The Sisters Of Mercy, Cool It Reba, Laurie Anderson, David Lee Roth, Bob Dylan, David Bowie, Leonard Cohen Various Positions, Paul Simon, Simon & Garfunkel.

== Discography ==
- 1975 : Barry Manilow by Barry Manilow
- 1978 : Peter Gabriel II by Peter Gabriel
- 1979 : Exposure by Robert Fripp
- 1979 : Entre Nous by Diane Tell
- 1979 : Bottom Line by John Mayall
- 1980 : Making Movies by Dire Straits
- 1980 : Sacred Songs by Daryl Hall
- 1980 : Red Cab To Manhattan by Stephen Bishop
- 1980 : Rock 'N' Rye by Mike Cross
- 1980 : Come Upstairs by Carly Simon
- 1980 : Suzanne Fellini by Suzanne Fellini
- 1981 : Street Angel by Ron Dante
- 1985 : Lost In The Stars The Music Of Kurt Weill by Various Artists
- 1985 : Crazy From The Heat by David Lee Roth
- 1987 : Never Let Me Down by David Bowie
- 1989 : Coast To Coast by Paul Shaffer
- 1992 : Revisited by Peter Gabriel
- 2002 : Anthology by Carly Simon
- 2003 : Then And Now by Peter Gabriel
- 2007 : The Essential Paul Simon by Paul Simon
