= Musa Ngum =

Gambian musical artist (1953- 2015)

- Also known as: Moussa Ngom; Musa Afia Ngum; Akasa
- Born: 1953
- Origin: Fatoto, The Gambia
- Died: 11 October 2015, Dakar, Senegal
- Genres: Mbalax; Njuup
- Occupations: Singer; Composer
- Years active: Late 1960s–2015

Musa Ngum (or Musa Afia Ngum, also spelled as "Moussa Ngom"; born 1953 in Fatoto, Kantora District in the Upper River Division, The Gambia; died 11 October 2015 at the Dantec Hospital (Fr.: Hôpital Aristide Le Dantec), Dakar, Senegal) was a singer and songwriter who was very popular in Senegal and Gambia. He was one of the pioneers of mbalax music, and "helped to define the mbalax style of popular music in the Senegambia" and "had a strong influence on Youssou N'Dour and other mbalax pioneers". He was "something of a cult icon back in the Senegambia region, and a pioneer of the mbalax fusion style". The mbalax, which originated from the Serer religious and ultra–conservative njuup music tradition sang during Ndut rites by circumcised boys (also referred to as "Kassak" songs) was the foundation of Ngum's music career. He mastered many of the njuup classics and built a name for himself while at the same time developing his voice.

One of the reasons Youssou N'Dour considered him to be a major inspiration was because of his lyrics in "noble" Wolof as opposed to "street" Wolof.

== Early life ==
Ngum was born in the village of Fatoto, Gambia, in 1953 to Pa Antouman Ngum and Ya Ramou Nyang (full name Ramatoulaye Nyang) of Banjul. Through his mother Ramatoulaye Nyang, Musa Ngum is cousin to the Gambian statesman and historian Alieu Ebrima Cham Joof. His surname Ngum also spelled as Ngom is a typical Serer surname within the Senegambia region. In a special interview with Raaki TV, Ngum stated that he is of Serer origin, and went on to state that "Wolof is not a tribe, but a language".

== Career ==
As a youth, Ngum started his music training in ndut classical teachings, singing ultra-traditional njuup songs also known as kassack songs. He mastered many of the njuup classics and built a name for himself while at the same time developing his vocal range.

He was the lead singer of Guelewar, as well as one of the lead singers of Super Diamono during the 1980s. He was also a solo artist, sometimes under his own name, and sometimes under the name "Moussa Ngom et l'Ensemble Lyrique Traditionnel du Senegal".

As a Pan-Africanist, Musa Ngum also actively worked to strengthen relations between Senegal and Gambia.

== Personal life ==
Ngum married Sohna Jobe in the 1970s and together they have nine children, two girls and seven boys. One of Ngum's children is the award-winning singer and songwriter Yusupha Ngum. His older cousin is the veteran musician and "legend" —Lie Ngum (commonly known by his artistic name Abdel Kabirr), who was one of the original members of the Gelewar Band, and owner of the Taranga Beach Resort in the Gambia.

== Death ==
On October 10, 2015, Ngum played a live concert in Dakar at club Just For You. The show was organized to mark his 40th anniversary in the entertainment industry. He performed alongside his son Yusupha Ngum and old friend and colleague Omar Pene. Few hours after the show, he fell sick and was rushed to the Dantec Hospital in Dakar. In the early hours of Sunday, October 11, 2015, Ngum was reported dead. Ngum was buried in Touba on "Monday, October 12, 2015, the presence of thousands of mourners from both The Gambia and Senegal including his family, friends, fans, musicians and religious personalities and government officials." Youssou N'Dour and Omar Pene were among those who attended.

== Legacy ==
Ngum's style of music is rooted in the ultra-traditional Senegalese music traditions that recalls the great empires, kingdoms, kings, queens and heroes of precolonial Senegal. His lyrics are filled with goodwill messages and wisdom designed to educate his listeners of their history and culture, and the virtues of a good citizen. His Pan-African believes are evident in his songs. He was one of the most famous Baifall (fr) of his generation. He was a revolutionary Baifall and an ambassador to the Baifall sect.

For decades, Ngum championed for a more united Senegambia (Senegal and Gambia)–under one president. He believed that, a united Senegambia would make a United States of Africa possible, because Senegalese and Gambians are the same people, speak the same languages, and share the same history and culture. Geographically, the Gambia is inside Senegal, surrounded by Senegal on all three sides. Historically, the people lived in kingdoms and empires, and the creation and separation of the two states was only a result of European colonization. For decades, Ngum created his own style of fashion where he wore unmatching shoes. He used to call one of the pair "Senegal" and the other "Gambia". For many years, that became his trademark and symbolized his belief in the unification of the two States under one president and for a possible United Africa. On one of his last interviews with the Senegalese television network TFM–recorded some hours before his death, the topic of his unmatching shoes were brought up again by the TV anchor. Ngum told the interviewer that he would not stop wearing none-matching shoes until and unless there is one Senegambia led by one president. He said that his dream was to see Senegal and Gambia united under one president.

In the Senegambia region, Ngum is regarded as a musical hero.

== Partial Discography ==
=== With Guelewar ===
- 1979 Sama Yaye Demna N'Darr
- 1980 Tasito
- 1981 Warteef Jigeen
- 1982 Dieuf Dieul Khadin Rassoul
- 198? Xaley Ndakarou Vol. 2
- 2011 Halleli N'Dakarou
- 2012 Touki Ba Banjul: Acid Trip from Banjul to Dakar

=== With Super Diamono ===
- 1985 Volume: Confederation
- 1985 Volume: Pastêf
- 1986 Borom Daarou
- 1987 People

=== Solo ===
- 1990 Banjul (under the name "Moussa Ngom et l'Ensemble Lyrique Traditionnel du Senegal")
- 1995 Circulation Lampe Fall (under the name "Moussa Ngom et l'Ensemble Lyrique Traditionnel du Senegal")
- 1995 (Goudi Ndakarou) En live au Sahel, Vol. 1 (live album)
- 1996 Gal Gui
- 1998 Alahou
- 1999 Artist
- 2003 (Goudi Ndakarou) En live au Sahel, Vol. 2 (live album)
- 2006 Bajen Yandeh (Ngom)

== Awards ==
- National Order of the Lion (Senegal)

== See also ==
- Guelowar
- Music of the Gambia
- Music of Senegal
- Music of Africa
