= Habib Faye =

Senegalese musician (1965–2018)

- Born: November 22, 1965; Senegal
- Died: April 25, 2018 (aged 52) Paris, France
- Genres: Mbalax, Afrobeat, Jazz, Funk, Afro-jazz
- Occupations: Bassist, keyboardist, guitar soloist, arranger, composer, producer, musical director
- Instruments: Bass, keyboards, guitar, percussion
- Years active: 1984–2018
- Formerly of: Super Étoile de Dakar, Harmattan, Habib Faye Quartet

Habib Faye (November 22, 1965 – April 25, 2018) was a bassist, keyboardist, guitar soloist, arranger, composer, and Grammy Award-nominated producer from Senegal. He was mostly known as the musical director for Youssou N'dour's Super Étoile de Dakar. He was one of the most talented African bassists of the last quarter-century.

He played bass and produced music for Super Etoile since 1984. He was believed to have picked up the bass when he was 13 years old, but started his musical exploration at the age of nine, thanks to his older brother, Vieux Mac Faye, who is an accomplished guitarist himself. His other brothers are musicians as well. Lamine Faye is one of Senegal's most popular and respected guitar players, and for a long time was a member of Super Diamono, before he left to form his own band, Lemzo Diamono, in 1991. Adama Faye, who died in 2005, is regarded as one of the pioneers of keyboard playing in Senegal. He was one of the founding members of Super Diamono and also played keys for Super Etoile back in the 1980s. The Faye brothers are, in many ways, very similar to the Wooten Brothers, although they never formed a band.

Super Etoile is one of Africa's best live bands, and they have been traveling all over the world for nearly three decades. In fact, in November 2007, music critic Robert Christgau said on NPR's All Songs Considered that he believed Youssou N'Dour's band is the world's best live band. Habib Faye cites the Amnesty International's "Human Rights Now" world tour in 1988 as maybe his most rewarding time as a musician. He says that it allowed him to grow as a bassist as he got to share the stage with music icons, such as Peter Gabriel, Sting, Tracy Chapman, and Bruce Springsteen. It is also in the middle of that tour that the album The Lion, in which Peter Gabriel participated, was recorded. Gabriel would invite Habib to join him on other records of his own later on.

In 1996, Mickey Hart hired him to play bass parts on his Mystery Box album. Habib Faye's resume also includes playing alongside a wide range of artists like Manu Katche, Mokhtar Samba, Joe Zawinul, Paco Sery, Gilberto Gil, Chet Atkins, Mark Knopfler, Branford Marsalis, Poogie Bell, David Sancious, Lionel Loueke, Tania St Val, Jacob Devarieux, David Sanborn, Brazil's Carlinhos Brown, just to name a few. He had produced albums for Senegal's top-selling artists such as Viviane Ndour and Kiné Lam.

In Senegal, Faye was regarded as a true genius as he had taken the bass to a completely new level in this West African nation. He was one of bass players in Senegal that brought the bass to the forefront and made it an instrument to be reckoned with. The song "Bekoor", from Youssou N’Dour's 1984 album Badou, is a reference for many Senegalese bassists. He has produced virtually every Youssou N’Dour album since 1984, including the acclaimed 1994 The Guide. In addition to having years of gigging under his belt, producing and touring with Super Étoile, he has been involved in many musical projects in Senegal, working with local artists. The latest is Abdou Guité Seck, Wock's former vocalist, who is now pursuing a solo career. His latest album is slated for release later this year.

Habib's force is his versatility. He grew up in an environment where music had no boundaries. His parents grew up dancing Salsa and rock ‘n’ roll. He also grew up seeing his older brothers experimenting with jazz and blues sonorities. He can virtually play any style, from the rootsiest Mbalax (Senegal's predominant musical style) to the grooviest Funk, not to mention Afrobeat and jazz.

Harmattan, the first band he founded, was one of the headlining acts at the 1998 edition of Saint-Louis International Jazz Festival, Senegal, one of the most prominent jazz festivals in Africa. In recent years, Habib had focusing on the new Afro-jazz band he occasionally put together, Habib Faye Quartet, often changing the line-up.

As far as his music philosophy was concerned, he explained that he was not trying to compete with jazz musicians or do pure jazz, but he tried to bring two different worlds together, i.e. the richness of the African sound and the world of jazz. He took the blend of African music and jazz to a new level adding traditional African instruments such as Kora, Sabar, Tama, and lesser-known ones. African music being very percussion-oriented, Habib developed a technique where he can often be heard playing percussion parts on his bass. That has the effect of making his sound far more rhythmic and distinctive. His brand of Mbalax that can be heard in most Youssou N’Dour albums, especially those released on the Senegalese market, puts percussive bass playing to the fore. With that he gave more power to the afore-mentioned African traditional instruments. His experiments culminated into the release of a live album, only available in Senegal, Special tribute to Jaco Pastorius, Live at "Central Park" Dakar. You can hear him on the album revisit some of Jaco's best known lines during his Weather Report years, adding an African twist to it.

Habib Faye's musicianship didn't stop at the bass; he was also an experienced keyboard player. He can be heard playing keyboard bass on countless Super Étoile tunes. He was one of the finest keyboard bassists out there. He pioneered marimba keyboard playing in Senegalese music, and it is the most popular style in Senegal right now. Paradoxically, he thought that producers were stuck with it and seemed not to want to look further. The lack of creativity on the part of some Senegalese musical directors worried him particularly. His work on guitar was no less important. All of that was evidenced in Youssou N’Dour's Live at Union Chapel DVD released in 2003.

In 2006, Faye flew to New York to work with Angélique Kidjo on her latest album, Djin Djin , released on May 1, 2007. Kidjo's website credits him as the "Senegalese bass giant". Djin Djin, which won a Grammy Award in 2008, features a myriad of stars, including Alicia Keys, Peter Gabriel, Carlos Santana, Josh Groban, and Branford Marsalis. Faye had toured with Kidjo and they recently played the North Sea Jazz Festival in the Netherlands.

In March 2008, Faye continued his jazz experiments when he brought Lionel Loueke, Herbie Hancock’s guitar player, and Mokhtar Samba, one of Africa’s premier drummers, to Dakar for a series of Afro-jazz concerts. The act was dubbed the "trio magique".

Habib endorsed De Gier basses in July 2008. The Dutch guitar maker credits him on its website as "an amazing bass player".

Habib Faye had been working on his debut album that was initially slated for release in 2009, but was still in the works.

On Wednesday April 25, 2018, he died aged 52, in Paris, where he was being treated for a lung infection. His death sent shockwaves throughout his native country of Senegal and the musical world. This forced Youssou Ndour to cancel his concert in Kigali to fly back home with the rest of the Super Etoile in order to pay tribute to their fallen brother.
