= Ngom =

Ngom can be:

- A village in Nigeria
- It is also spelt Ngum is a West African surname of the Serer people found in Senegal and the Gambia.

Notable people with the surname Ngom include:

- Dawda Ngum, Gambian footballer
- Ousmane Ngom
- Khady Yacine Ngom
- Musa Ngum, Gambian singer and songwriter
- Yusupha Ngum, Gambian singer and songwriter
- Hassane Ngom, Professional boxer
