= Rémi Jegaan Dioh =

- Born: Rémi Jegaan Dioh; Fadiouth, Senegal
- Genres: Njuup, West African World music, Folk music, Christian music in Serer-Siin language.
- Occupations: Singer, composer, guitarist and author
- Years active: Active since 1985 ( Big break).
- Website: remijegaan.com

Rémi Jegaan Dioh (also Rémi Diégane Dioh) is a Senegalese singer, author, composer and guitarist. He is of Serer heritage and had worked with prominent artists like Yandé Codou Sène and toured in Europe particularly in France, the UK and Spain as well as the US with Fadiouth's choirs and the Martyrs of Uganda. He has also performed solo on the invitation of The Gambia's president Yahya Jammeh. His mother was a singer and his father was one of the most established dancers in Senegal. Most of his music is sung in Serer. He was a teacher before venturing to the music business.

In 1985, with his song "Imbokatwa Xani", a call for unity, he won first prize in the music contest of the Bureau Sénégalais du Droit d'Auteur (BSDA).

By 2 July 2009, he had composed over 364 songs in Serer, Wolof and French based on the Serer Njuup music tradition (the progenitor of Mbalax). He is among the first to introduce guitar on conservative Serer folk music and at one point to the dismay of the well established Serer Diva Yandé Codou Sène who is stricter on Serer conservative tradition.

In 1984, he wrote profane, a religious cassette (2002), a religious CD and tape in (2006) and a secular CD in (March 2007).

== Some tracks include ==
- Rok Ndudaab
- Te Yundox & Ma Gneuw Ba Fekala
- Jokti Mbap Naa
- Manga Siga
- Bukar O Kor Niid
- Maam Kura
- Belew Kadii
- HM!TOK'F A Refa
- Remy Diegane chante Senghor
