= Géédy Dayaan =

Studio album by Super Jamano de Dakar
- Released: 1979
- Venue: Jandeer Night Club, Dakar, Senegal
- Genre: Rock; reggae
- Label: Disques Griot

Géédy Dayaan or Geedy Dayaan is an album by Senegalese (later Senegambian) band Super Diamono in 1979, under their new name at the time, Super Jamano de Dakar. It was released on Disques Griot. The album was recorded at the Jandeer, a night club in Dakar.

Omar Pene, the lead vocalist of the band, and one of its original members, was given little room to showcase his vocals by the band's management. Critics such as Mazzoleni describe the album as "a rather tasteless mixture of rock, reggae, synthetic strings and 'African percussion' influences"

== Track listing ==
Side	Song
A1	Yamatée Née Law
A2	Indu Waad
A3	Cuur Ngonée Ngalang
B1	Muugn
B2	Manduléén
B3	Gee Dy Dayaan

== Artists and credits ==
- Alto saxophone – Ndiaga Samb, Tonia Lô
- Backing vocals – Amadou Baye Diagne, Bassirou Diagne
- Bass – Baïla Diagne
- Drums – El Hadj Ousmane Diagne
- Guitar – Bob Sène
- Organ, synthesizer, piano – Papa Basse
- Percussion – Aziz Seck
- Trombone – Moustapha Fall
- Trumpet – Cheikh Sadibou Niasse
- Lead vocals – Omar Pène
