= Iso (album) =

Studio album by Ismaël Lô
- Released: 26 July 1994
- Recorded: at Studio Harry Son, Paris, France
- Genre: Mbalax
- Length: 56:52
- Label: Mango
- Producers: Ibrahima Sylla, Saidou Khalidou

Ismaël Lô chronology
Ismael Lo (1990)	Iso (1994)	Jammu Africa (1996)

Iso is an album by Ismaël Lô, released in 1994. The album contains soft guitar melodies, and traditional Senegalese mbalax. It peaked in the top 10 on Billboard's World Albums chart.

== Production ==
The album was produced by Ibrahima Sylla and Saidou Khalidou. It was recorded in Paris.

== Critical reception ==
Professional ratings
Review scores
Source	Rating
AllMusic	3/5 stars

Rolling Stone wrote that "Lo's trademark is a blend of spare guitars and ululating Islamic singing that trades lines with a moody, airy harmonica." The Gazette determined that "the production is sweet and one or two tracks are catchy, but most of the emotion seems fabricated." The Guardian noted: "Socially-aware songs and a lonesome harmonica have won him a 'Bob Dylan of Senegal' tag, but the title does scant honour to the beauty of his voice."

AllMusic wrote that "the music moves ... from pure Afrobeat, on to piano-accompanied vocal work, vaguely in the vocal jazz/pop singer style."

== Track listing ==
1. "Dibi Dibi Rek"
2. "Nafantav"
3. "Kasi Rap"
4. "Rero"
5. "Maseven"
6. "EM-ZET"
7. "VVO"
8. "Baol Baol"
9. "Naboou"
10. "Nassarane"
11. "Deep Soweto"
12. "Chakka Dolla"
13. "Khar"
14. "Siya Shezi"

== Notes and personnel information ==
- Personnel: Ismael Lo (vocals, acoustic guitar, harmonica); Babacar Dieng, Awa Maiga, Isabella Gonzales, Myriam Betty (vocals); Ass Malick Diouf, Yves Njock, Roe (guitar); Patrick Papino, Alain Hato (saxophone); Giansserand (trumpet); Bolognesi (trombone); Pierre Michel Sivadier (piano); Ousmane Wade, Manu Lima (keyboards); Jean Bardy (contrebass); Samba Laobe Ndiaye, Tony Bonfils (bass); Youssou Camara, Brice Wassi (drums); El Hadj Faye (sabar); Samy Ateba (percussion); Ousmane Toure (background vocals).
- Engineers: Philippe Brun, Alex Firla.
- Principally recorded at Studio Harry Son, Paris, France.
- All songs written or co-written by Lo.
