= Coumba Gawlo =

Senegalese musician

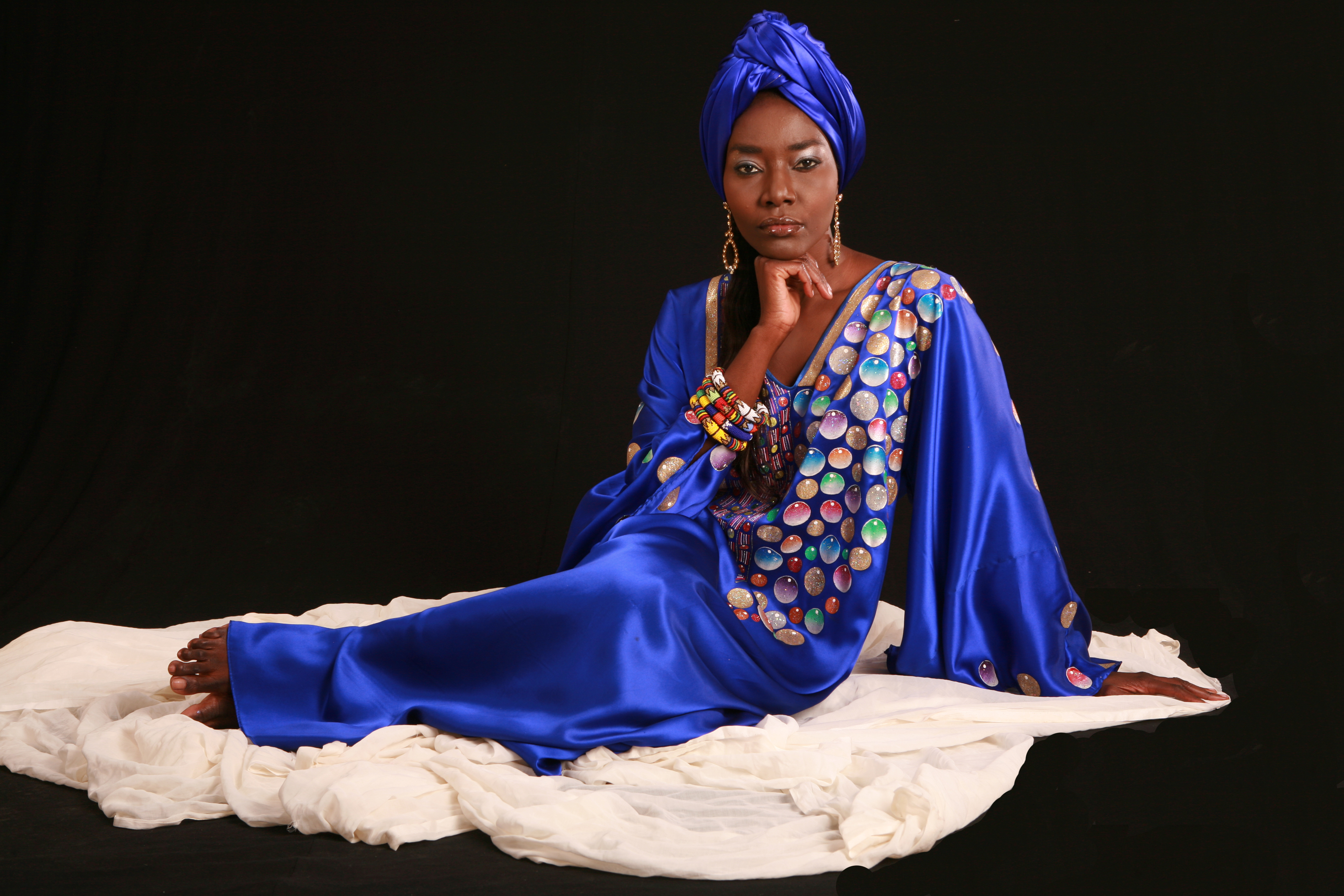

Background information
- Born: 29 January 1972 (age 54)
- Origin: Dakar, Senegal
- Genres: Mbalax, folk, pop, acoustic
- Occupations: Singer, songwriter, composer, dancer
- Years active: 1986–present
- Label: Sabar
- Website: www.coumbagawlo.com

Coumba Gawlo Seck is a Senegalese singer-songwriter and composer. She is the second best selling Senegalese singer in Senegal after Youssou N'Dour. Her greatest success was a version of "Pata Pata", a platinum single which was number one for two weeks in Belgium and sold 50,000 copies one day in France in 1998.
