= Nder =

Nder may refer to:

- Alioune Mbaye Nder (born 1969), Senegalese singer
- N'Der, also spelled Nder, town in northern Senegal
