= Lemzo Diamono =

Senegalese musical group

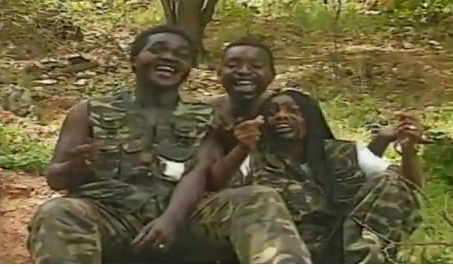

Background information
- Origin: Sénégal
- Genres: Marimbalax, Mbalax,
- Years active: 1990 - 1998
- Label: Stern's
- Past members: Lamine Faye Alioune Mbaye Nder Salam Diallo Mada Ba Fallou Dieng Amath Samb Amy Mbengue Alié Diagne Moustapha Faye Pape Diouf Moussa Traoré Sanou Diouf Moustapha Fall Ma Anta Faye Abdoulaye Diallo Khadim Ndiaye Thierno Kouyaté Mamadou Lamine Maïga

Lemzo Diamono was a Senegalese musical group, well known in the 1990s. The group was mainly active from 1990 to 1998.

== Group members ==
Past members

- Lamine Faye
- Alioune Mbaye Nder
- Salam Diallo
- Mada Ba
- Fallou Dieng
- Amath Samb
- Amy Mbengue
- Alié Diagne
- Moustapha Faye
- Pape Diouf
- Moussa Traoré
- Sanou Diouf
- Moustapha Fall
- Ma Anta Faye
- Abdoulaye Diallo
- Khadim Ndiaye
- Thierno Kouyaté
- Mamadou Lamine Maïga
- Cheikh Ba

== Discography ==
Here is a list of Lemzo Diamono's albums

=== Studio albums ===
- 1992: Vol.1: Jom (cassette; Talla Diagne)
- 1992: Vol.2: Setsima (cassette; Saprom)
- 1993: Vol.3: Xarnu Bi (cassette; Adama Sene)
- 1994: Masla-Bi(1ere Partie) (cassette; Talla Diagne)
- 1994: Akara (cassette; Talla Diagne)
- 1995: Hors Serie: Simb (cassette; Talla Diagne)
- 1996: Vol.5 (cassette; Talla Diagne)
- 1997: Marimbalax (CD; Stern's, STCD 1076)
- 1998: Co Co Rico (Cassette; no label)

=== Live albums ===
- 1997:En Live Diapason vol 1 (cassette; KSF)
- 1997:En Live Diapason vol 2 (cassette; KSF)
