= Pape Diouf (artist) =

Senegalese music artist

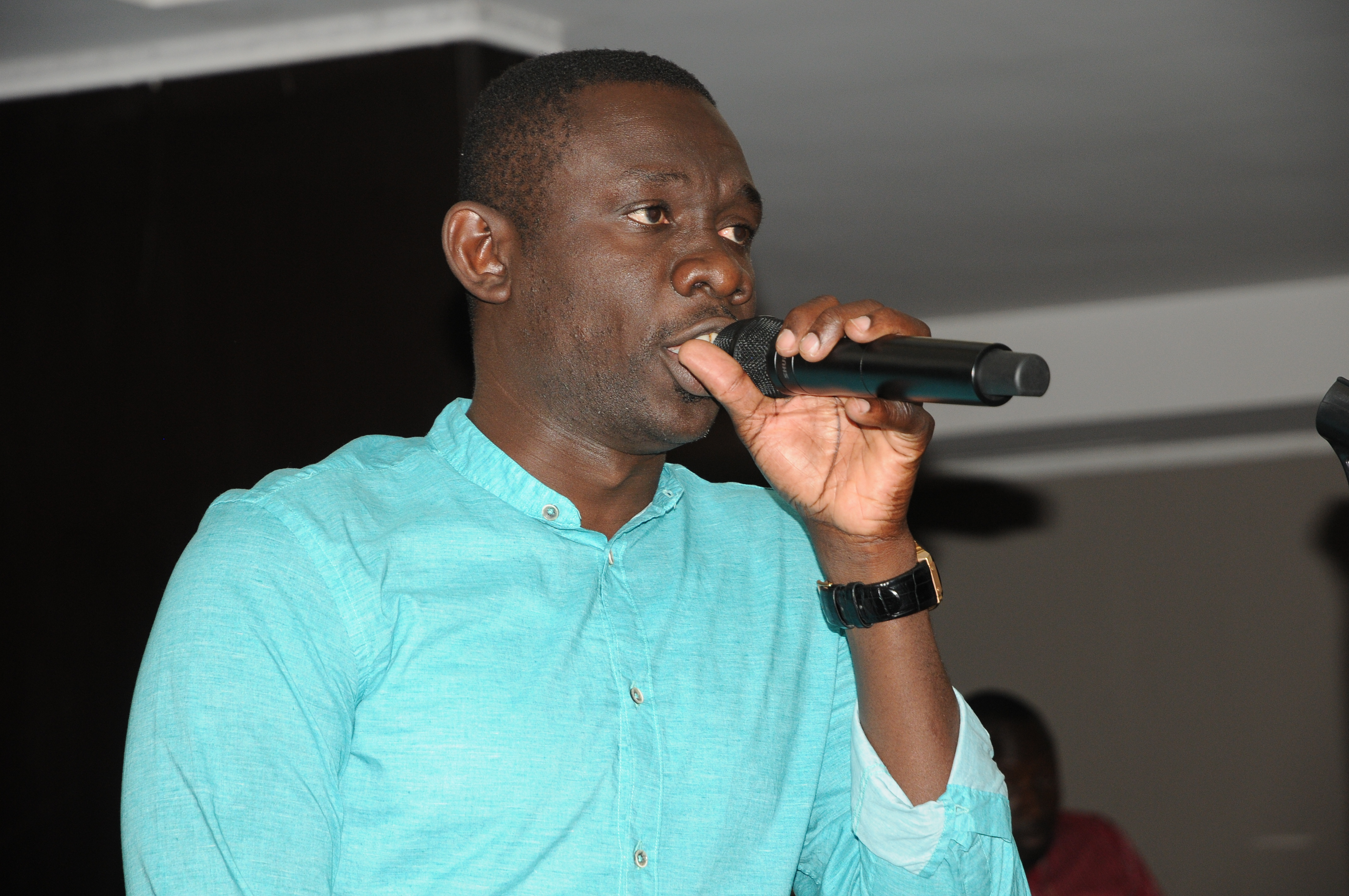
Artist Musician

Pape Cheikh Diouf (born 1973) known by his stage name Pape Diouf, is a musical artist from Dakar, Senegal.

== Career ==
Initially, he was groomed by his uncle to become a plumber but he found his calling in music. At the age of 22, he joined the Lemzo Diamono musical group and became widely recognized with few major singles. He went solo after 1998 and formed La Génération Consciente group after a couple of years. Over the years, he has extensively contributed towards the revival of Dakar's classic Mbalax music. He toured USA and Canada, among other countries, in 2016.

== Discography ==
Year	Albums	Singles
2004	Partir!	
2008	Jotna	
2012	Casse Casse	Diofior
2014	Ràkkaaju	
2018	Enjoy	
2020	Far West Africa	
2022	Ecoutez !	

== Awards ==
Year	Award	Conferring Body
2009	Best Male Artist	Senegal Music Awards
2009	Best Male Mbalax Vocal Performance	Senegal Music Awards
