= Super Diamono =

- Also known as: Super Jamano de Dakar; Super Diamono de Dakar; Omar Pene & Super Diamono; Omar Pene & Super Diamono de Dakar
- Origin: Dakar, Senegal
- Genres: Mbalax; rock; blues; reggae
- Years active: 1975–
- Labels: Disques Griot; Real World
- Past members: Bob Sene (El Hadj "Bob" Sene); Omar Pene; Babacar Dieng; Thio Mbaye; Oumar Sow; Doudou Konaré; Musa Ngum; Mada Ba; Pape Dembel Diop; Ismael Lô; Iba Ndiaye; Lappa Diagne (El Hadj Ousmana "Lappa" Diagne); Mamadou Lamine Maïga;; Cheikh Diange; Abdou M' Backe; Amadou Baye; Aziz Seck; Baïla Diagne; Cheikh Sadibou Niasse; Ibou Konate; Jean Alain Hedgar; Lamine Faye; Moustapha Fall; Ndiaga Samb; Papa Basse; Tonia Lô.

Super Diamono was a ten-member band from Dakar, Senegal. It was formed in 1974 or 1975. Omar Pene was a founding-member, and the group was alternately led by the singers Mamadou Lamine Maïga and Musa Ngum. It started with traditional West African music, but quickly turned to an Afro-Cuban and pop-influenced sound. From 1977 they called their music "Mbalax-blues". In 1979, Ismaël Lô, a co-founder of the group, rejoined the band as a guitar player, but soon left again for his solo career. According to Billboard Magazine, it was Senegal's "first truly local pop style." Many of the former members who later became solo artists made their break-through from this band.

== Background ==
In 1972, Baïlo Diagne, Senegalese music manager and later manager of Super Diamono was looking for a singer for his group Kadd Orchestra (or Cadd Orchestra)—which consisted of family members such as Cheikh Diange among others. By 1975, Diange's group was complete, and included members of Kadd Orchestra along with other Senegalese groups and musicians such as Omar Pene and Ismael Lô. That new group, which was principally an amalgamation of various bands—came to be known as "Super Diamono" (meaning "generation" in Wolof). Bob Sene (El Hadj "Bob" Sene), a bassist, is credited as the creator of Super Diamono, which in turn showcased the charismatic singers Omar Pene and Ismael Lô, then Mamadou Maïga and Moussa Ngom.

Diange's new group mostly consisted of musicians from Tropical Jazz and the Kadd Orchestra consisting mainly of Diagne's own family members. It was so family oriented that the group came to be referred to as the "Diange Ochestra" in its early years. In 1979 under a new name Super Diamono de Dakar, the group released their first album with Disques Griot (Griot Records) titled Géédy Dayaan. Critics such as Mazzoleni describe the album as "a rather tasteless mixture of rock, reggae, synthetic strings and “African percussion” influences"

In the 1970s and 80s, the band was the biggest band in Senegal–touring throughout West Africa.

After years of working together, members left the group to create their own solo careers or set-up break-off groups such as Lemzo Diamono. Officially, the band broke up in 1991 but reassembled later by Pene. Since its founding, the band and Pene in particular have addressed issues of great interest to the youth, such as unemployment, corruption and inequality.

== Former band members ==
The band has had various members over the years. Those who left were replaced by new members. The list below are some of the former members (not necessarily serving in the same year(s)).

- Bob Sene (El Hadj "Bob" Sene), bassist and creator of Super Diamono
- Musa Ngum, the Gambian musician with a strong background in the njuup (or kassack) style of music—who was ethnically Serer like many of the band members—left the Gambia in 1981 and moved to Senegal. In Senegal, he was courted for years by the group to join the band. He finally joined the group in 1985; at that time, Super Diamono was the biggest band in Senegal. In the group, he was known for his great presence on stage and strong vocals.
- Mada Ba was a group member for 8 years (on vocals).
- Pape Dembel Diop, a former member of the group (on bass) resigned after 22 years. On the 40th anniversary of the group to which he did not partake in, he was asked by Leral Newspapar about the circumstances surrounding his resignation and whether he was on good terms with group leader Omar Pene. Diop refused to make any comment that would tarnish the image of the group, only saying that ethics does not allow him to say anything that could be detrimental to the Super Diamono group. He went on to say that having served the group for 22 years, he saw both good and bad, but has no desire to dwell on that separation. On the subject of his relationship with Omar Pene, Diop said: “We had differences, but we did not fight. I know him better than anyone. He knows me, but I know him too. I call him my big brother. At my age, I don't hold a grudge against anyone. Only God knows the future that he has in store for me [...]"
- Omar Pene, original member and co-founder
- Ismael Lô, one of the co-founders. He kept joining and leaving to pursue his solo career. Worked with Omar Pene for 9 years. In 1979, he rejoined the group after Bailo Diange (Super Diamono's manager) offered him the position of guitarist and asked him to officially incorporate his training. He accepted and soon after the group went on an eight-month tour of Casamance, the southern region of Senegal.
- Babacar Dieng (vocals)
- Thio Mbaye (percussion and vocals)
- Oumar Sow (guitar)
- Doudou Konaré (guitar)
- Iba Ndiaye (musical keyboard)
- Lappa Diagne (El Hadj Ousmana "Lappa" Diagne), (drums)
- Mamadou Lamine Maïga, also known as Mamadou Maïga or just Maïga, is a highly skilled vocalist. Known for his high pitched-falsetto range. He used to alternate with Musa Ngum, another strong vocalist.
- Cheikh Diange
- Abdou M' Backe
- Amadou Baye
- Aziz Seck
- Baïla Diagne
- Cheikh Sadibou Niasse
- Ibou Konate
- Jean Alain Hedgar
- Lamine Faye
- Moustapha Fall
- Ndiaga Samb
- Papa Basse
- Tonia Lô

== Select discography ==
- 1976: Géédy Dayaan
- 1981: Ndaxami
- 1982: Gaïndé
- 1985: Mam
- 1987: People
- 1988: Cheikh anta Diop
- 1989: Adama N'diaye
- 1991: Nila
- 1992: Étudiant
- 1993: Fari
- 1993: Fan's
- 1993: Saï-Saï
- 1994: Nioun Niar
- 1995: 20 Ans Déjà
- 1997: Tiki Tiki
- 1998: Afsud
- 2001: 25 Ans
- 2003: Lampe
- 2007:Moom Tamit

== Literature ==
- Bauerle. Mirella; Broughton, Simon; Ellingham, Mark; Muddyman, David; Burton, Kim; Trillo, Richard; Woltering, Monika; and Mauerle, Mirella: Rough Guide. Weltmusik. Metzler (2000) ISBN 3476015327 (German)
