= Alioune Mbaye Nder =

Senegalese singer (born 1969)

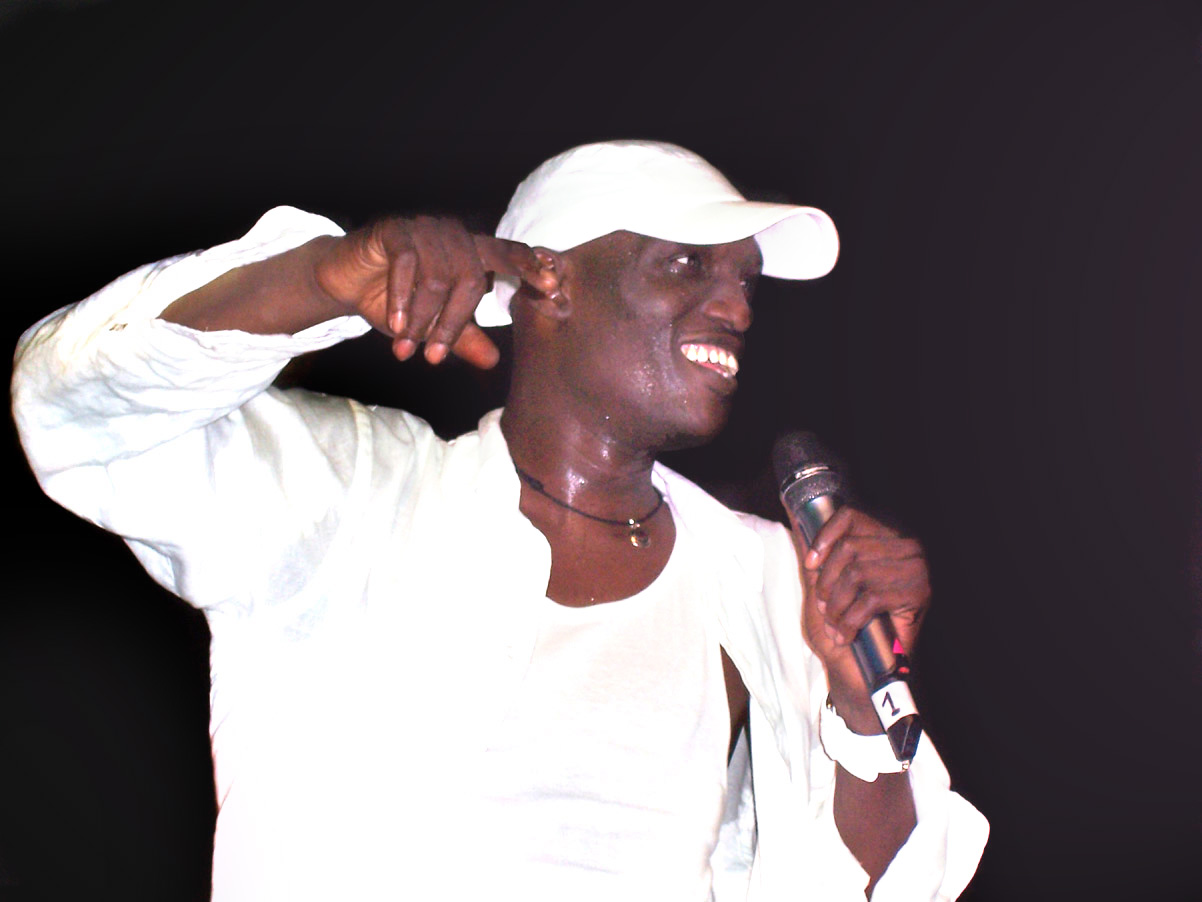

Background information
- Also known as: Nder; The Prince of Mbalax
- Born: Alioune Palla Mbaye; April 28, 1969 (age 57)
- Origin: Tivaouane, Senegal
- Genres: mbalakh and international
- Occupations: Singer, songwriter, musician
- Years active: 1990s–present

Alioune Palla Mbaye, known as "Nder" (born April 28, 1969, Tivaouane, Senegal), is a Senegalese singer. Nder takes his name from the n'der, the drum favoured by his griot father.

== Background ==
A dancer and percussionist in his youth, Nder began his singing career in 1991 with the group Lemzo Diamono, a break-off group from the hugely popular Super Diamono. Lemzo Diamono also included well-known Senegalese guitarist Lamine Faye. In 1993, Nder became Lemzo Diamono's lead vocalist and the band earned a large following over the next few years. In 1995, Nder left Lemzo Diamano to form his own band, the Setsima Group.

Nder, whose music until very recently was mostly available only on cassette, is regarded in Senegal as a modern-day griot and a super star of the new (Boul Falé) generation after Youssou N'Dour and Baaba Maal. He is known in Senegal as The Prince of Mbalax, and by some fans, The King of Mbalax.

Mbalax is a genre of African popular music developed in Senegal and Gambia. Evolving from the traditional rhythms of the Wolof people, and absorbing a Cuban influence, and later western pop, funk, and reggae influences. It incorporates traditional percussion instruments and singing (in Wolof, French, and sometimes English), with modern electric instruments such as electric guitar, electric bass, synthesizer, drum set, and also typically brass section. It was made popular by Senegalese pop star Youssou N'Dour.

Two of Nder's heroes are Bob Marley and Michael Jackson.

== Le Setsima Group ==
Nder created le Setsima Group from young players whom he could mould and grow alongside, and it has remained a tight formation, with just a few personnel changes since then. Dakar's Le Temoin wrote: "The arrangements essentially done by the young musicians of le Setsima Group can easily compete with those traditionally realized by 'studio sharks.' What great art!"

=== Band members ===
- Alioune Mbaye Nder - lead vocal
- Aïcha Koné, Mbene Seck - backing vocals
- Talla Seck, Lamine Touré - percussion
- Malick Diaw - Lead guitar
- Saliou Ba - Bass guitar
- Ibou Tall, Elou Fall - keyboards
- Bassirou Mbaye - drums
- Mor Sarr - saxophone
- Ibou Konaté - trumpet

== Discography ==
Nder & le Setsima Group

- Confiance(2007) – Afrique Productions Musiques (APM)
- Courage (2005) – KSF Productions
- Muchano (2003) – KSF Productions
- Lu Tax? (2002)
- Takussaan à Dakar (Live), (2002) – Africa Fête AFD006
- Live anniversaire vol. 2 (Live), (2001)
- Live anniversaire vol. 1 (Live), (2001)
- Super Thiof (2000)
- Pansement (2000) – Africa Fête AFD003/Setsima
- Nder & le Setsima Group (1999) – World Connection WC 43010
- Aladji (1998)
- Lënëën (1997)
- Aduna (1995)

With Lemzo Diamono

- Marimbalax (Compilation), (1996) – Stern's

– (Note) The majority of Nder's music is still only available on local cassette, and only within Senegal. CD versions of Pansement and Nder & le Setsima Group are more widely available in Europe however.
