= Yusupha Ngum and the Affia Band =

Australian world music band

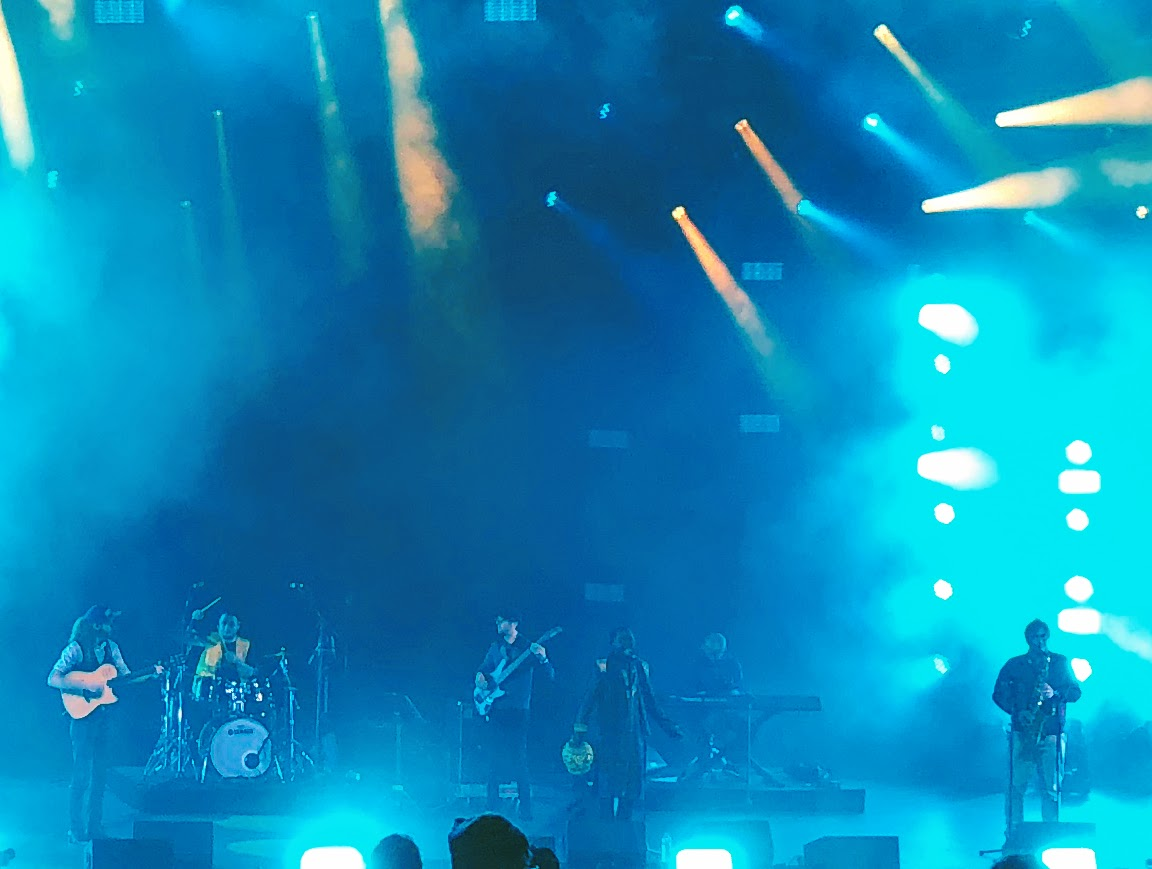
- Yusupha Ngum and the Affia Band performing in 2021

Background information
- Origin: Melbourne, Australia
- Genres: world music; jazz fusion; folk music; ska
- Years active: 2016–present
- Members: Yusupha Ngum; Paul Cornelius; Nick Delaney; Byron Goodwin; Hong Yang
- Past members: Felix Billington Kleinman; Luke Koszański; Matt Steele; Rodolfo Hechavarria Despaigne; Hiroki Finn Hoshino; Daniel Mougerman; Stephen John Khlentzos; Solomon Sisay; Adam Halliwell

Yusupha Ngum and the Affia Band is a band based in Melbourne, Australia, which was founded in 2016 by Gambian singer-songwriter, Yusupha Ngum.

Their song Gaïndé, which was written to celebrate the Senegal team's qualification in the 2018 FIFA World Cup, received significant public and media attention in Senegal and Gambia as well as in the Australian media.

The band has also been noted for their popular festival performances.

According to ABC Radio, the message of the band is "about peace and harmony."

== Career ==
The Affia Band was formed in 2016 as a five-person band, with the initial line-up of Yusupha Ngum on lead vocals, Hiroki Finn Hoshino on double bass and bass guitar, Felix Billington Kleinman on drums, Stephen John Khlentzos on keyboards, and Adam Halliwell (also of Mildlife) on electric guitar. Adam Halliwell left later that year, and was replaced by Solomon Sisay on saxophone. Sometimes guest musician Chris Maunders would join the band on stage on harmonica during live performances.

In 2017, Solomon Sisay left and Paul Cornelius joined as the band's saxophonist. Also in 2017, Rodolfo "Panga" Hechavarria Despaigne joined as a sixth band member on congas. Stephen John Khlentzos later left the band to move overseas, and Daniel Mougerman joined the band on keyboards.

2017 was also the year that the band started to gain significant public attention. After their performance at the Healesville Music Festival, a newspaper reporter asked Festival chair Bob Willis to name some bands with "stand out performances". Yusupha Ngum and the Affia Band was one of the three bands Willis named as ones "that really pulled the crowds".

In 2018, the band recorded their original song Gaïndé to celebrate the Senegal team's qualification in the 2018 FIFA World Cup. The title of the song means "The Lion" in the West African Wolof language. In addition to the regular band members, guest musicians Luke Koszański joined them on electric guitar, and Boubacar Gaye performed on djembe to record the single and music video. The single was mixed by Niko Schäuble of Pughouse Studios, and the music video was filmed and directed by Jeff Valledor of Jeffrowz Video Production. The single and music video were executive produced by Melbourne music venue entrepreneur Ousmane Ngom. The song received significant public and media attention in Gambia and Senegal, and was also covered in the Australian media.

Later in 2018, Daniel Mougerman left and joined funk band The Bamboos, and Matt Steele subsequently joined the Affia Band on keyboards.

In 2019 at the Castlemaine Jazz Festival, the band line-up consisted of Yusupha Ngum, Hiroki Finn Hoshino, Paul Cornelius, Matt Steele, Felix Billington Kleinman, and Rodolfo "Panga" Hechavarria Despaigne. Angus Radley filled in for Hiroki Finn Hoshino for one of the festival performances, on bass guitar. Later in 2020, Hiroki Finn Hoshino moved to Japan, and Nick Delaney joined the band as their bass guitarist.

The Midland Express newspaper highlighted the band in their reporting on the upcoming 2019 Castlemaine Jazz Festival. A magazine article after the festival reported Yusupha's comments on how "he is passionate about the unifying and cultural storytelling power of music", and how he "paid a moving tribute to African youth and the problems they are facing, dedicating his song to their plight".

In January 2021, Beat Magazine included Yusupha Ngum & the Affia Band's upcoming performance at the "Live at the Bowl" series of events at the Sidney Myer Music Bowl as one of "six unmissable gigs" in February. This performance was cancelled due to a Covid-related lockdown, mandated by the Victorian state government. However, the performance was then rescheduled, again at the iconic Sidney Myer Music Bowl, for March 29, 2021.

In a February 2021 interview in Beat Magazine, Mary Sitarenos said of Yusupha Ngum that, "He’s one of a kind," and "I would say he would be one of the greatest West African singers Australia has."

In their live performances, guest musician Luke Koszański has sometimes joined the band on stage on electric guitar, and Huich Goh sometimes on violin. In 2021, Rodolfo "Panga" Hechavarria Despaigne left the band for personal reasons, and Luke Koszański joined the band's permanent lineup.

In 2022, Byron Goodwin joined the band on drums, and Hong Yang on keyboards.

On 2 July 2022, Yusupha Ngum and the Affia Band was one of the featured bands on Weekend Evenings with Christine Anu on ABC Radio.

== Personnel ==
=== Current members ===
- Yusupha Ngum – vocals
- Paul Cornelius – saxophone
- Nick Delaney – bass guitar
- Byron Goodwin - drum kit
- Hong Yang - keyboards

=== Former members ===
- Felix Billington Kleinman – drum kit
- Luke Koszański – electric guitar
- Matt Steele – keyboards
- Rodolfo "Panga" Hechavarria Despaigne – congas
- Hiroki Finn Hoshino – bass guitar, double bass
- Daniel Mougerman – keyboards
- Stephen John Khlentzos – keyboards
- Solomon Sisay – saxophone
- Adam Halliwell – electric guitar
