= Omar Pene =

Senegalese musician (born 1955)

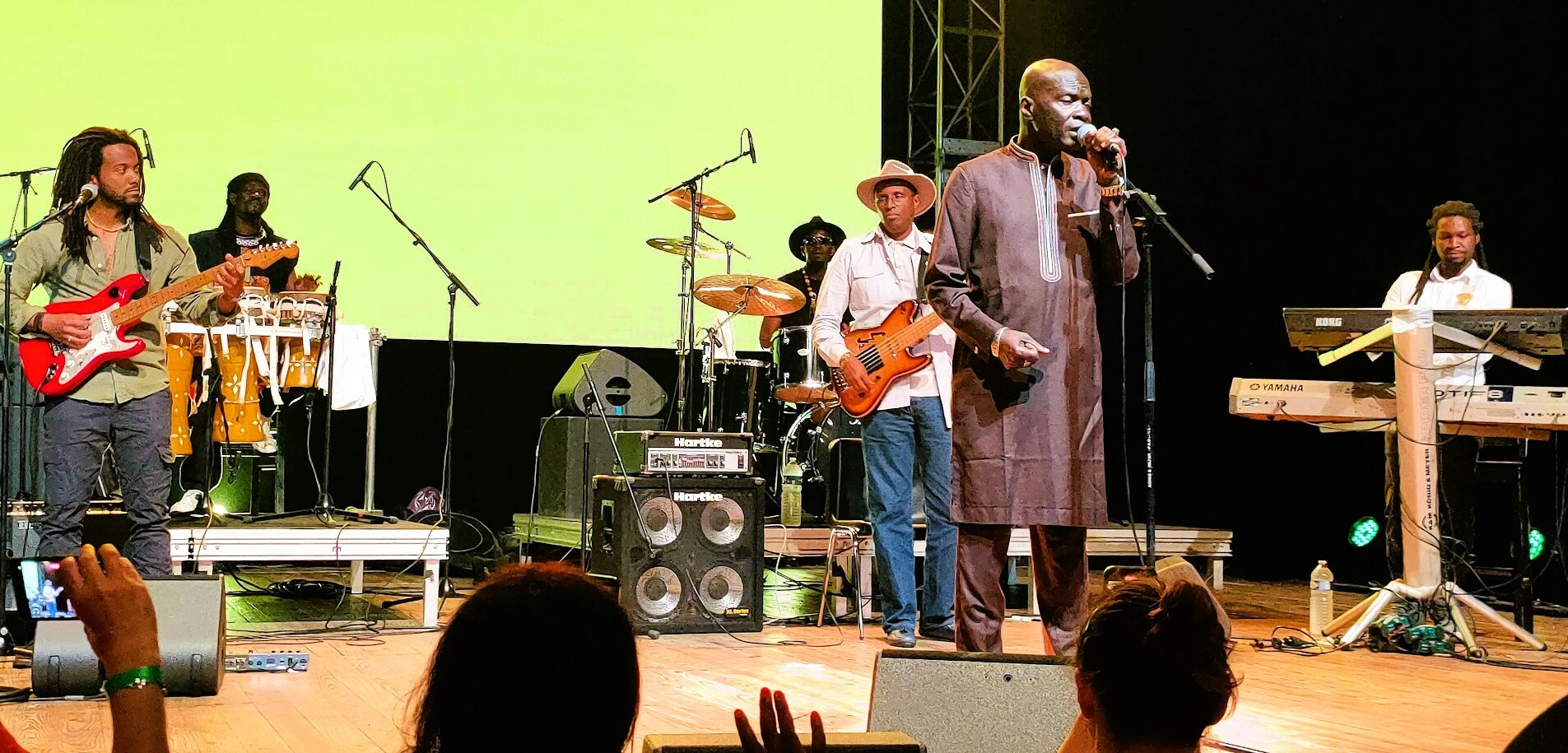
Image of Omar Pene

Omar Pene (born 28 December 1955) is a Senegalese vocalist and composer, who is the lead singer of Super Diamono, and is now a solo artist.

== Career ==
Omar Pene was born in the working-class neighborhood of Derkle in Dakar into a wolof family. Having been singing his whole life and playing in other bands, he formed Super Diamono in 1975–76, with previous bandmates Cheikh Diagne, Bassirou Diagne, and Bazlo Diagne, along with members of Tropical Jazz De Dakar, including singer Ismael Lo. Other members of the band included Bob Sene, Aziz Seck, Lapa Diagne, Abdou Mbacke and Adama Faye, a jazz keyboardist who gave the group a harder electric sound. Under their new name Super Diamono de Dakar, the band released their first album Géédy Dayaan in 1979 under Griot Records (Disques Griot).

In Dakar, during the 1980s, Super Diamono were one of the few bands who could compete with Youssou Ndour in Dakar, and the two singers had a lively artistic competition, both with devoted fanbases. Fans of Pene and Super Diamono used to congregate particularly at the Balafon Club, near the Autonomous Port of Dakar. Super Diamono's music was energetic reggae and jazz influenced dance music rooted in Senegalese mbalax rhythms, which are frenetic and syncopated. Their songs cover socially conscious topics such as unemployment and education, and they were described by Rough Guide: World Music as "the people's band of Dakar's proletarian suburbs".

In the mid-1980s, Ismael Lo left to follow a solo career and was replaced by Mamadou Lamine Maïga. By 1991, most of the group's original members had left for other projects, and Pene continued the band with session musicians, touring Europe and North America four years later. To date, he has released more than thirty albums and cassettes.

In August 2021, he released his first solo album Climat.
