= Ismaël Lô =

Senegalese musician and actor (born 1956)

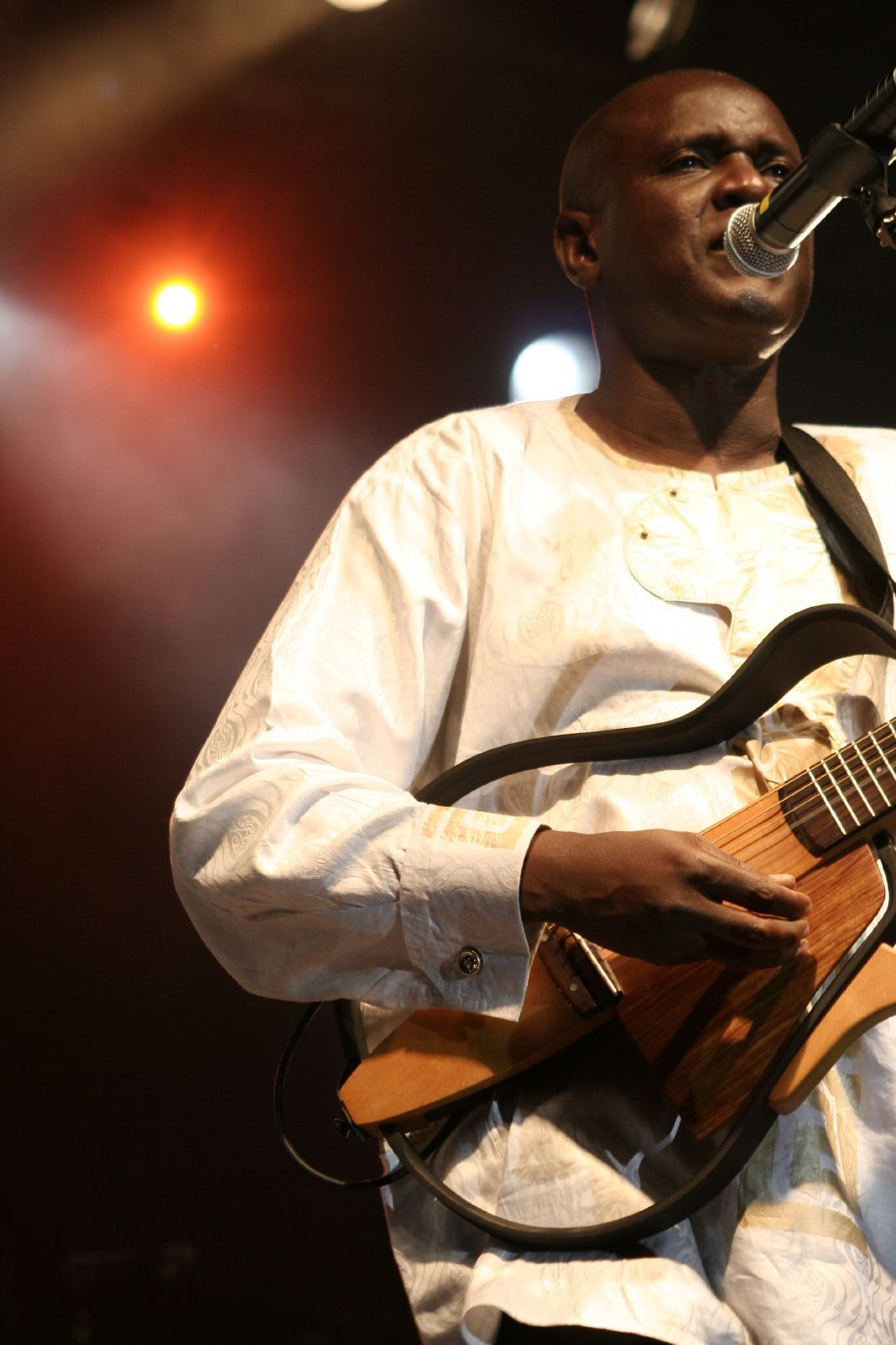
- Lô at Mumes Festival, 2007

Background information
- Born: 30 August 1956 (age 70); Dogondoutchi, Niger
- Origin: Senegal
- Genres: Worldbeat; Mbalax; Afro-pop; World music
- Occupations: Singer, songwriter, musician
- Instruments: Guitar, harmonica, vocals
- Years active: 1970s–present
- Labels: Barclay Records; Mango; Syllart Records
- Website: http://www.ismael-lo.com

Ismaël Lô (also Ismaël Lo; born 1956) is a Senegalese musician and actor.

== Life ==
Lô was born in Dogondoutchi, Niger on 30 August 1956, to a Senegalese father from wolof ethnic group and a Nigerien mother. Shortly after Lo's birth the family returned to Senegal where they settled in the town of Rufisque, near the capital Dakar. He plays guitar and harmonica, and has been called "the Bob Dylan of Africa".

In the 1970s, Lo studied at the School of Art in Dakar. He later joined the popular group Super Diamono, but left in 1984 to start a solo career. Over the next four years, Lo recorded five popular solo albums.

In 1988, he composes the soundtrack for Ousmane Sembene's Camp de Thiaroye and plays in it. He would also star in Moussa Sene Absa's film Tableau Ferraille (Iron Landscape), in 1996, and compose more soundtracks.

In 1990, Lo signed a recording deal with Barclay and recorded in France his seventh solo album, Ismael Lo. Thanks to the success of the single "Tajabone" the album became a hit in the European charts. The album launched Lo's international career.

Iso was recorded and released in 1994, and also became a success. The album contains soft guitar melodies and traditional Senegalese mbalax. The following year Lo toured in Africa. The compilation album Jammu Africa was released in 1996. The song "Without Blame" is a duet with Marianne Faithfull.

Lo's song "Tajabone" was featured in Pedro Almodóvar's 1999 film All About My Mother.

In 2002, he was made a Knight of the Legion of Honor.

His 2006 album Sénégal was recorded in Dakar, Paris and London. Lo says of it, "Giving this album the title Sénégal was my way of paying tribute to my own country, in recognition of all its gifts to me".

The film Shake Hands with the Devil (2007), about the Rwandan genocide, starts with Lo's song "Jammu Africa".

== Discography ==
=== Albums ===
- Gor Sayina (1981)

- [A] Yaye Boye Balalma / Gor Saay Na / Ale Lo/ Woudje Yaye – [B] Tiedo / N'daxami / Sey / Adou Calpe

- Xalat (1984)

- [A] Xalat / Tali Be (Talibe) / Lote Lo – [B] Xamul Dara / Mariama / Fa Diallo

- Xiif (1986)

- [A] Alal / Bode Gor / Xiif (Ethiopie Sahel) – [B] Tiedo / Diouma / Marie Lo

- Natt (1986)

- [A] Ataya / Natt / Djola Kele – [B] Samag La / Mougneul / Tadieu Bone

- Diawar (1988)

- [A] Jele Bi/ Sophia / Taar Dousey – [B] Diawar / Jalia / Adou Calpe

- Wadiour (1990)

- [A] Wadiour / Diabar / Souleymane – [B] Mbarawath / Nene / Tariha

- Ismael Lo (1990)

- Tajabone / Raciste / Ale Lo / Jiggeny Ndakaru / Fa Diallo / Souleymane / M'barawath / Nene

- Iso (1994)

- Dibi Dibi Rek / Nafantav / La Femme sans haine / Rero / Senegambie / Baol Baol / Naboou / Nassarane / Wassalia / Setsinala / Khar / Samayaye

- Jammu Africa (compilation, 1996)

- Jammu Africa / Nafantav / Sofia / Tajabone / Raciste / Nabou / Without Blame / Dibi Dibi Rek / Lotte Lo / Souleymane / Samba Et Leuk / Takou Deneu / Khar

- Dabah (2001)

- Aiwa / L'amour a tous les droits / Biguisse / Amoul Solo / Dabah / Boulfale / Faut qu'on s'aime / Africa Democratie / Diour Sani / Badara / Ma dame / N'Dally / Xalas / Mam

- Sénégal (2 October 2006)
1. "Baykat"
2. "Incha Allah"
3. "Tass Yakar"
4. "Jola"
5. "Taar Dusey"
6. "Manko"
7. "Yaye Boye"
8. "Plus je fais ci, plus je fais ça"
9. "Mbindane"
10. "Wakhal"
11. "Ouvriers"
12. "Jiguen"
13. "Ma fille"
14. "Tajabone"

== Singles ==
- Rero (1994)

== Guest singles ==
- Africa Nossa (2006) (with Cesária Évora)

=== Music videos ===
Year	Video
1994	"Rero"
1996	"Jammu Africa"
2006	"Africa Nossa" (with Cesária Évora)
