= Titi (singer) =

Senegalese singer

- Citizenship: Senegal
- Occupation: Singer

Titi, also known by her real name Ndeye Fatou Tine, is a singer from Senegal. Her name of Titi comes from a nickname given to her as a child by her uncle. She started her career as a dancer but was inspired by Youssou N'Dour and moved on to becoming a singer. As a dancer she performed with Papa Ndiaye Thiou and also appeared in music videos of Senegalese stars such as El Hadji Faye and Pape Djiby Ba.

She started singing with Fatamba Kuyetah (a Guinean living in Senegal), and moved on to working with many other artists.

She spent 3 years living in Guinea where she met Youssou N'Dour who persuaded her to return to Dakar and work with him.

Her popularity extends beyond Senegal and she is very popular in the Gambia.
