= Senegambia =

Geographical region in West Africa

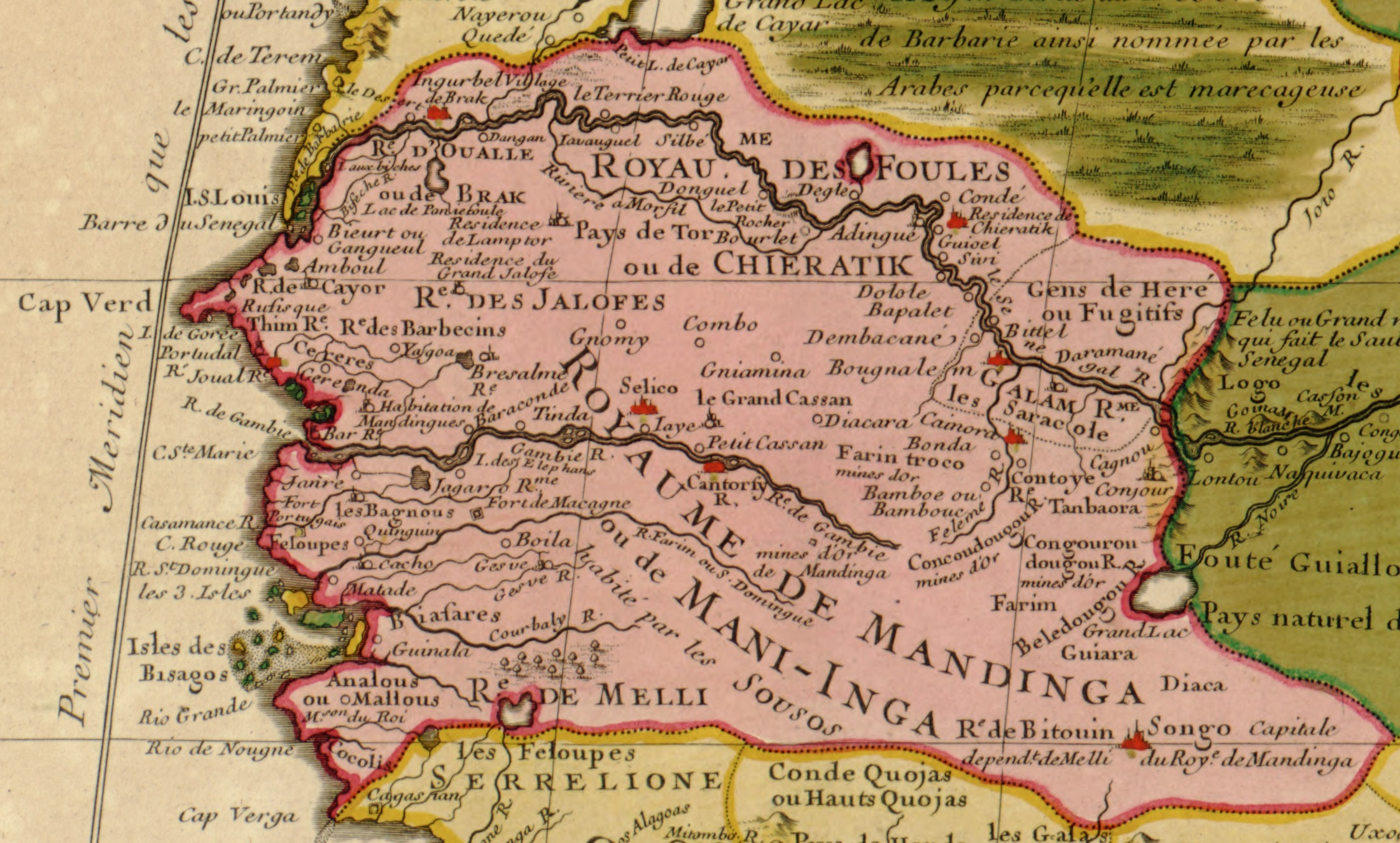
Delisle's 1707 map of Senegambia.

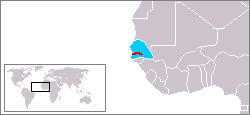
Senegal The Gambia

The Senegambia (other names: Senegambia region or Senegambian zone, Senegàmbi in Wolof and Pulaar, Senegambi in Serer), in the narrow sense, is a historical name for a geographical region in West Africa roughly lying between the Senegal River and the Gambia River. However, there are also sources which state that Senegambia is understood in a broader sense as the western part of the Sudan region.

Geographically, the region lies within the tropical zone between the Sahel and the forests of Guinea, with Senegal and Gambian Rivers underpinning the region's geographical unity. The region encompasses the modern states of Senegal, The Gambia, and Guinea-Bissau, as well as portions of Mauritania, Mali, and Guinea. It should not be confused with the recent Senegambia Confederation, which was a loose confederation between The Gambia and Senegal from 1982 to 1989, set up just after The Gambia's 1981 coup d'état where the Senegalese government intervened to reinstate the democratically elected Gambian government.

Spanning beyond the borders of the Senegambia Confederation, the Senegambia region was described by the Senegalese historian and scholar Professor Boubacar Barry of UCAD as historically "the main gateway to Sudan, the cradle of the great empires of Ghana, Mali and Songhai" and "the centre of gravity for West Africa."

== History ==
=== Ancient history ===
According to Professor Abdoulaye Camara of IFAN and the Senghor University in Alexandria, Egypt, early humans appeared in Senegal around 350,000 years ago. Benga and Thiam posit that, it is in the Falémé valley in the southeast of the country where we find the oldest traces of human life.

In Senegambian Neolithic history, the period when humans became hunters, fishermen and producers (farmers and artisans) is well represented and studied. This is when more elaborate objects and ceramics emerged, testifying to various human activities. The Diakité excavation in Thiès shows evidence of human mobility over a distance of about 600 km, during the Senegambian Neolithic age.

Located in south of Mbour (in the Thiès Region), an ancient culture referred to as the Tiemassassien culture, Tiemassassien industry, Tiémassas or just Tiemassassien was discovered during a Senegalese excavation half a century ago. Descamps proposed that this culture pertains to the Neolithic Era about 10,000 years ago. Dagan however proposed the Upper Paleolithic Era. This culture was named after Thiès, the region it is in.

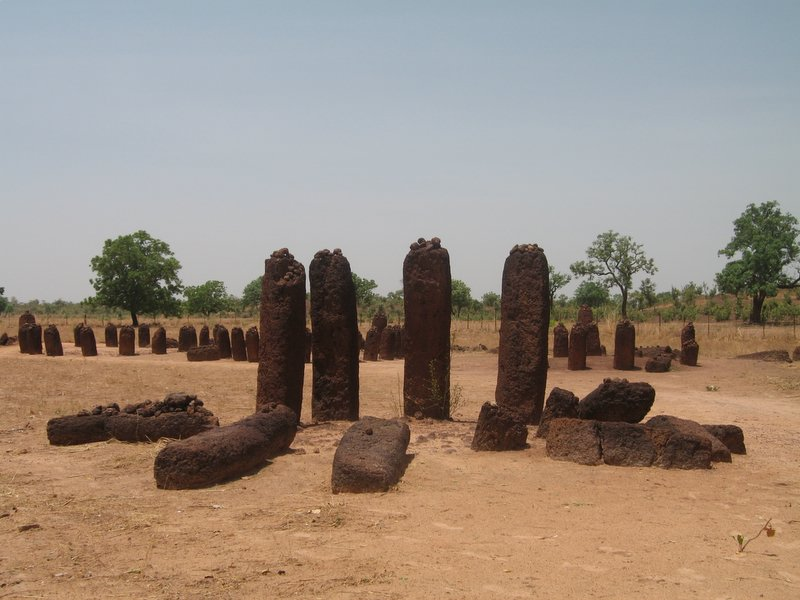
Senegambian stone circles (Wassu)

The Senegambian stone circles are also located in this zone. Numerous tumuli, burial mounds, some of which have been excavated, revealed materials that date between the 3rd century BC and the 16th century AD. According to UNESCO : "Together the stone circles of laterite pillars and their associated burial mounds present a vast sacred landscape created over more than 1,500 years. It reflects a prosperous, highly organized and lasting society."

=== Medieval period ===
During the medieval period of Europe which corresponds roughly to the Golden Age of West Africa, several great empires and kingdoms sprang out from the Senegambia region, including but not limited to the great Ghana Empire, the Mali Empire, the Songhai Empire, the Jolof Empire, the Kaabu Empire, the Kingdoms of Sine, Saloum, Baol, Waalo and Takrur. During this period, several great dynasties rose and fell, and some, such as the Guelowar Dynasty of Sine and Saloum, survived for more than 600 years despite European colonialism, which fell as recently as 1969, nine years after Senegal gained its independence from France. It was also out of this region that the ancient lamanic class sprang. The ancient lamanes were the landowning class and kings. According to Barry, the "lamanic system is the oldest form of land ownership in precolonial Senegambia."

=== Early modern and modern ===
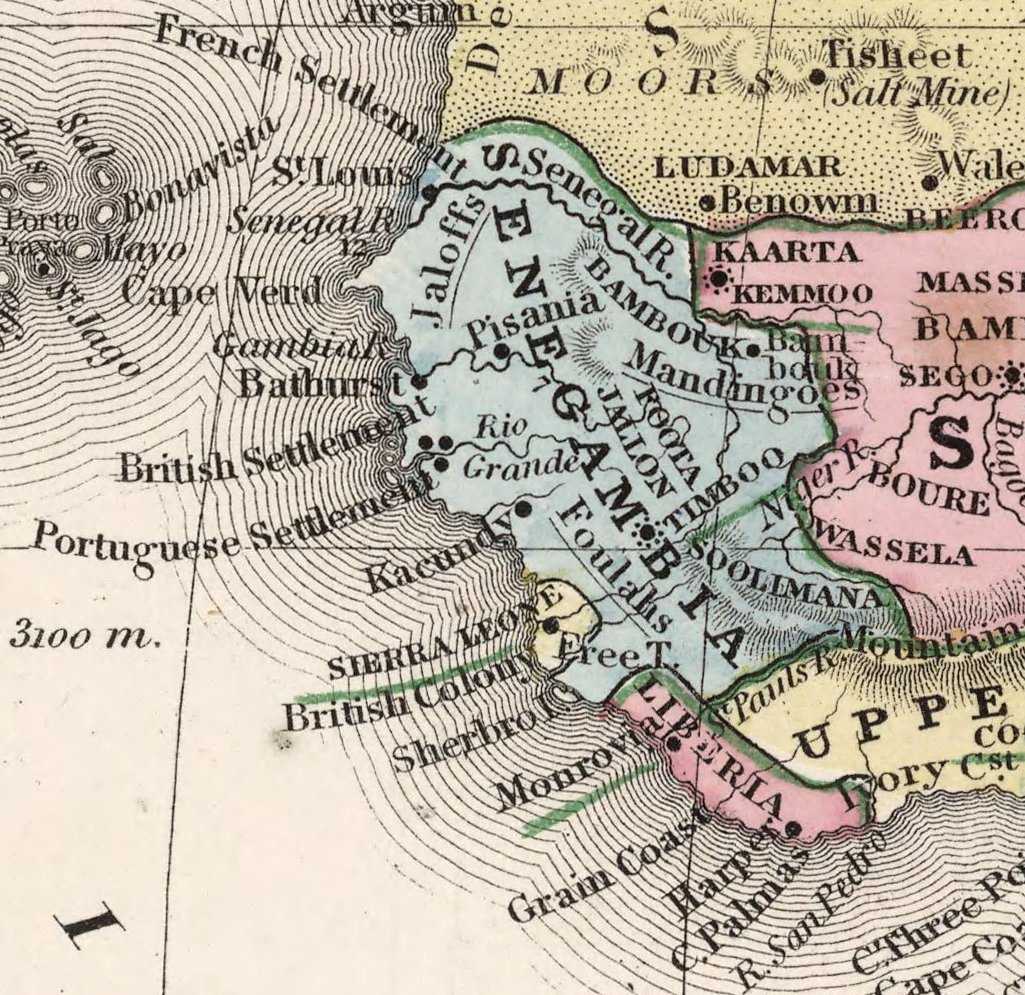
Senegambia depicted on map before 1884 Berlin Conference to divide Africa.

From the 15th century, the region became a focus of Franco-British-Portuguese rivalry. The Portuguese were the first to arrive in the region in the 1450s. Until the 16th century, they held a monopoly on trade.

In 1677, the French took the island of Gorée, and in 1681 they took control of Albreda on the Gambia River. This started a rivalry with the English, and in 1692 they briefly confiscated Gorée and Saint-Louis. In 1758, during the Seven Years' War, Gorée was captured by the British, who held it until 1763. In 1765, the British formed the Senegambia Province. In 1778, during the American War of Independence, the French went on the offensive, and razed James Island in the River Gambia. In 1783, the Treaty of Versailles recognised British claims to The Gambia and French claims to Saint-Louis and Gorée, dissolving the Senegambia Province.

The French pursued a policy of expansion and saw The Gambia as an obstacle. In the late 19th century, they proposed ceding Dabou, Grand Bassam, and Assinie in return for The Gambia. The negotiations broke down but were repeatedly brought up again. After the failed 1981 coup d'état in The Gambia, a Senegambia Confederation was proposed and accepted. This lasted until 1989.

=== Slave trade ===
Senegambia was a prominent region in West Africa during the transatlantic slave trade. Even before Columbus discovered the New World in October 1492, an increase in the number of slaves from the region arriving in the Iberian Peninsula was noted in the 15th century.

An estimated 490,000 slaves were taken from Senegambia and put on ships destined for the Americas between 1650 and 1900.

The region was influential in the abolition of the slave trade.

== Culture ==
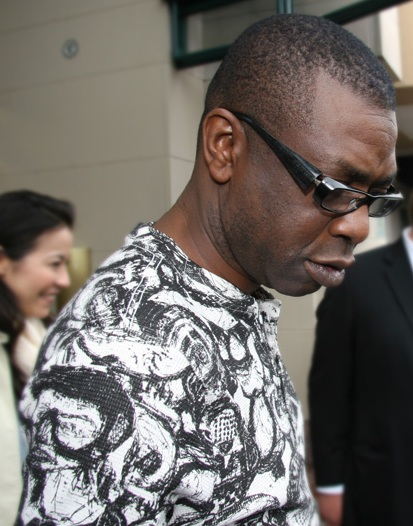
Youssou N'Dour at the 2008 Toronto International Film Festival.

The Senegambia region has a rich culture including joking relationships (Sanankuya) between patrilineal clans and ethnic groups. This joking relationship ensures peaceful coexistence where one ethnic group can criticize or even insult another without the recipient taking offence. This bond of cousinage is called maasir or kalir in Serer, kal by the Wolof, kallengooraxu in Soninke, sanaawyaa in western Mandinka, and agelor in Joola (Fogny).

The griot caste are found extensively in the Senegambia region. They preserve genealogy, history and culture of the people. There is also a mutual exchange of cuisines among the inhabitants of this region. Thieboudienne, originating in Saint-Louis, Senegal, has spread to neighbouring areas of West Africa over the years, where it is now better known as jollof rice. Tigadèguèna, a peanut stew, originated in Mali; another called maafe, or domoda in Gambia, originated in Senegal.

From the old and sacred music genre of njuup to the modern mbalax beats (derived from the Serer njuup tradition), the region has a rich and old music and dance tradition. Senegalese singer Youssou N'Dour was Africa's most famous singer (according to Rolling Stone magazine in 2014), and held the title as Africa's most powerful and biggest music export for several decades (before Akon, who is also from this region). The African Renaissance Monument built in 2010 in Dakar, standing at 49 m (161 feet), is the tallest statue in Africa.

Traditional Senegalese wrestling called njom in Serer, laamb in Wolof and siɲɛta in Bambara is a favourite pastime and national sport in some parts of the region especially in Senegal.

== Media ==
Senegambian media are varied and include several radio stations, television channels, newspapers and Internet. Some of these radio stations and TV channels such as Radiodiffusion Télévision Sénégalaise, Radio Gambia and GRTS are publicly owned, but most of the media especially radio stations and newspapers are privately owned.

On 4 October 1973, Radio Senegal (Office de Radiodiffusion Télévision du Sénégal (ORTS) as it was known at the time), which had been in talks with Radio Gambia about producing a joint radio programme based on Senegambian history and broadcast in the local Senegambian languages came to an agreement, and the first ever recording of the programme Chossani Senegambia (the history of Senegambia) was made. The show was prerecorded and both Senegal and Gambia broadcast at the same time every Tuesday. That was the first show of its kind within the Senegambia region, where two media houses from different states broadcast the same show at the same time every week. The Gambian historian, and statesman Alieu Ebrima Cham Joof who was former Director of Programmes and Head of Local Languages at Radio Gambia was one of the pioneers of that joint programme. In his book, Senegambia - The land of our heritage (1995), p 12, Cham Joof writes:

The programme Chossanie Senegambia... has a higher audience in the Gambia and Senegal than any other programme broadcast by ORTS and Radio Gambia. It is the only programme that goes into the people's own culture and tells them about the history of their ancestors.

== Ethnic groups ==
The Senegambian zone is home to various Senegambian ethnic groups including Wolof, Peul (or Fula), Tukulor (or Toucouleur), Manding, Sereer (or Serer), Soninke, Susu (or Sousou), Joola, Nalu, Baga, Beafada, Bainuk, and Bassari.

== See also ==
- French West Africa
- Senegambia and Niger
- Senegambia (Dutch West India Company)
- The Gambia–Senegal relations
