= Fatoto =

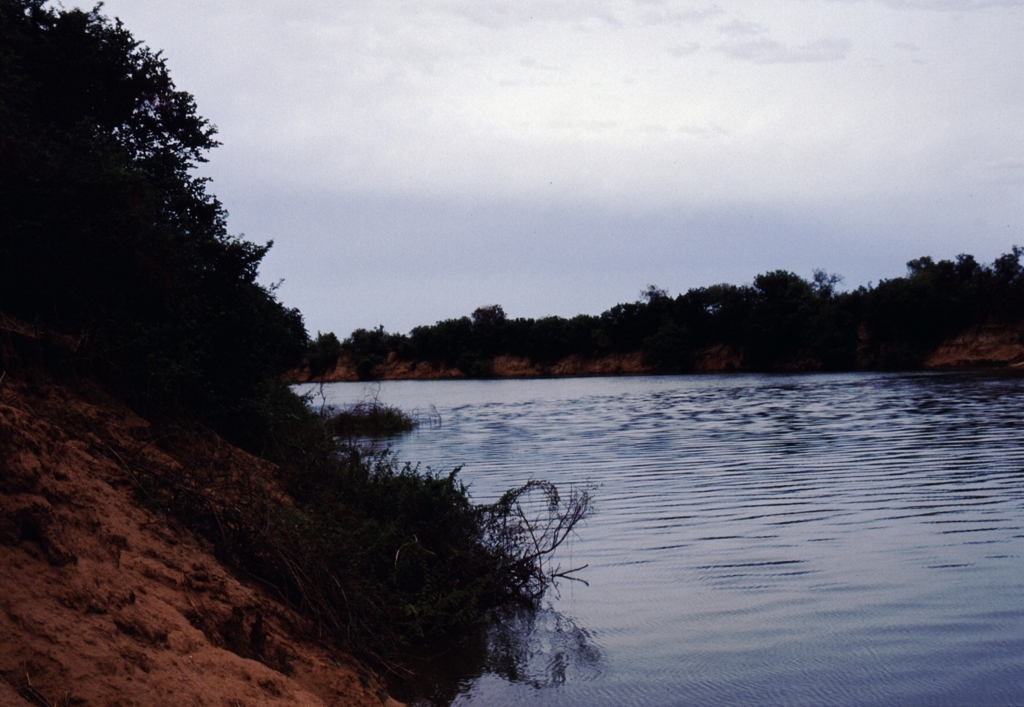
- On the Gambia River

- Location in the Gambia
- Coordinates: 13°24′N 13°53′W
- Country: The Gambia
- Division: Upper River Division
- District: Kantora

Population (2009)
  - Total: 1,685 (est.)

Fatoto is a small town in eastern Gambia on the Gambia River. It is located in Kantora District in the Upper River Division. As of 2009, it had an estimated population of 1,685.

Fatoto was a major market town in the Upper River Region by at least 1921, attracting business from neighboring Senegal.

A bridge over the Gambia River, funded by the Chinese government, opened in October 2021.

== Climate ==
Climate data for Fatoto (1991–2020)
Month	Jan	Feb	Mar	Apr	May	Jun	Jul	Aug	Sep	Oct	Nov	Dec	Year
Mean daily maximum °C (°F)	35.1 (95.2)	37.6 (99.7)	40.0 (104.0)	41.6 (106.9)	41.0 (105.8)	37.8 (100.0)	33.7 (92.7)	32.4 (90.3)	32.8 (91.0)	34.8 (94.6)	36.6 (97.9)	35.2 (95.4)	36.5 (97.7)
Daily mean °C (°F)	24.8 (76.6)	26.9 (80.4)	29.6 (85.3)	31.7 (89.1)	32.3 (90.1)	30.8 (87.4)	28.3 (82.9)	27.5 (81.5)	27.7 (81.9)	28.6 (83.5)	27.7 (81.9)	25.1 (77.2)	28.4 (83.1)
Mean daily minimum °C (°F)	15.0 (59.0)	16.7 (62.1)	19.8 (67.6)	22.6 (72.7)	24.2 (75.6)	24.1 (75.4)	23.2 (73.8)	22.9 (73.2)	22.7 (72.9)	22.7 (72.9)	19.0 (66.2)	15.1 (59.2)	20.7 (69.3)
Average precipitation mm (inches)	0.1 (0.00)	0.3 (0.01)	0.0 (0.0)	0.1 (0.00)	9.7 (0.38)	80.1 (3.15)	178.4 (7.02)	247.2 (9.73)	205.5 (8.09)	56.7 (2.23)	0.3 (0.01)	0.3 (0.01)	778.7 (30.66)
Average precipitation days (≥ 1.0 mm)	0.1	0.0	0.0	0.0	1.0	6.1	11.0	15.4	13.4	4.1	0.0	0.2	51.3
Source: NOAA

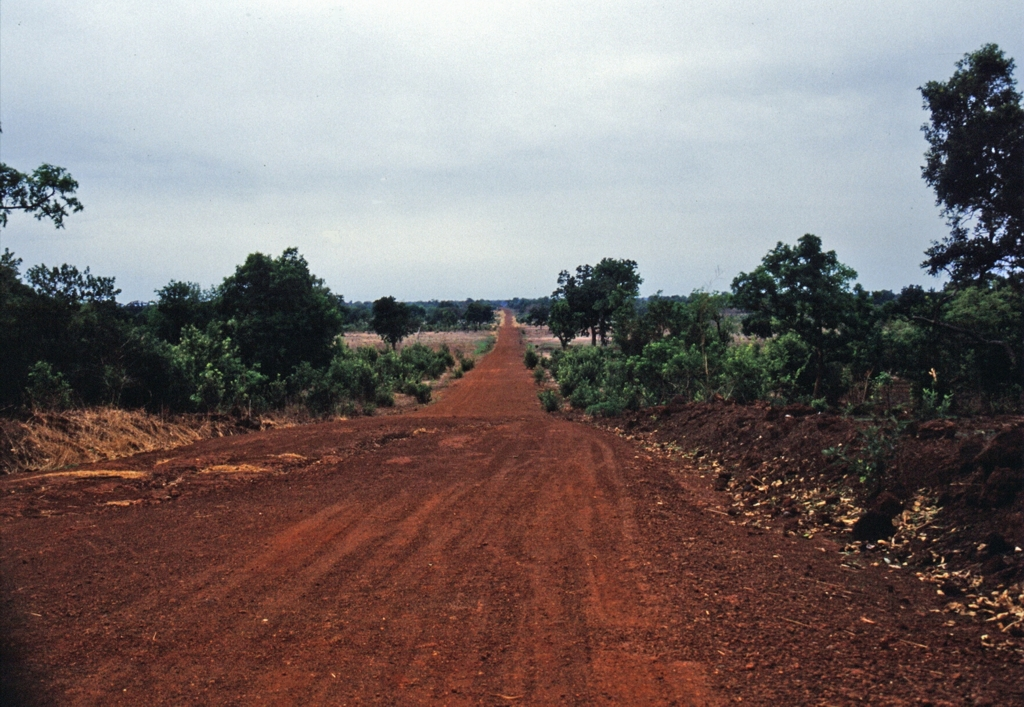
The road on the north bank across from Fatoto in 2000, before the road was paved and the bridge built.
