= Senegambia Confederation =

Union of Senegal and The Gambia (1982–89)

Coordinates: 14°40′N 17°2′W

Senegambia Confederation Confédération de Sénégambie
- 1982–1989
- Flag

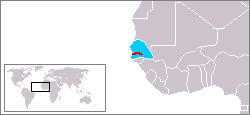
- Location of Senegambia in Western Africa. Senegal The Gambia
- Status: Confederation
- Capital: Dakar (Senegal); Banjul (The Gambia)
- Common languages: French; English; Wolof; Serer; Mandinka; Fulani; Jola
- President
  - 1982–1989: Abdou Diouf
- Vice President
  - 1982–1989: Dawda Jawara
- Historical era: Cold War
  - Agreement signed: 12 December 1981
  - Established: 1 February 1982
  - Disestablished: 30 September 1989

Area
  - Total: 207,401 km^{2} (80,078 sq mi)

Population
  - 1985: 7,227,000
- Currency: CFA franc (Senegal); Gambian dalasi (The Gambia)
Preceded by	Succeeded by
Senegal; The Gambia	Senegal; The Gambia

Senegambia, officially the Senegambia Confederation or Confederation of Senegambia, was a loose confederation in the late 20th century between the West African countries of Senegal and its neighbour The Gambia, which is almost completely surrounded by Senegal. The confederation was founded on 1 February 1982 following an agreement between the two countries signed on 12 December 1981. It was intended to promote cooperation between the two countries, but was dissolved by Senegal on 30 September 1989 after The Gambia refused to move closer toward union.

== Background ==
=== Early history ===
As a political unit, Senegambia was created by duelling French and English colonial forces in the region. Competition between the French and English started in the late 16th century when merchants from both nations started to establish trading centres in the region. Although there was some overlap in their areas of influence, French trade centred on the Senegal River and the Cap-Vert region and English trade on the Gambia River. As European trading activities in the region intensified, Senegambia quickly became a major African center of the Atlantic triangular trade, with merchants from Europe bringing manufactured goods to trade for gold, ivory and slaves.

During various periods of conflict between the British and the French in the 18th century, the trading posts of both nations in Senegambia quickly became military targets. During the Seven Years' War, American merchant Thomas Cumming convinced Southern Secretary William Pitt to dispatch a British expeditionary force to capture French trading posts in Senegal; after the expedition was successful, the region under British occupation was transformed into the crown colony of Senegambia. The unified region collapsed in 1779. With the British occupied by the American War of Independence in North America, the French recaptured Saint Louis and destroyed the largest British trading post in the Gambia region. The unified region ended officially in 1783 in the aftermath of the British defeat by and independence of the United States.

The Treaty of Versailles (signed along with the Treaty of Paris that officially ended the American War of Independence) created a balance between France and Britain: Saint Louis, l'île de Gorée and the Senegal River region were restored to France, and the Gambia was left to the British. In the 1860s and 1870s, both nations began to consider a land-trading proposal to unify the region, with the French trading another West African holding for the Gambia, but the exchange was never completed. Although the areas were ruled by separate, competing powers, they did not determine an official border between the French and British Senegambian colonies until 1889. At the time, France agreed to accept the current border between the two countries and remove its border trading posts.

This decision resulted in the future Senegal (which gained its independence from France in 1960) and the Gambia (which gained independence from Britain in 1965) sharing a large problem: how to successfully maintain two separate countries in a region with shared yet diverse cultural values, and one nation virtually surrounded by another.

=== Prelude of the confederation ===
For each country, the "lock and key" border situation has posed unique problems for international relations, especially in trade and control of regions surrounding The Gambia–Senegal border. Since the end of colonization, the Senegalese government had maintained trade barriers that provided preferential treatment for French goods imported into the country, while the Gambia had virtually no trade barriers. The opposing trade policies fueled a large black market around The Gambia–Senegal border, which brought cheaper manufactured goods into Senegal. The black market also attracted an export drain into the Gambia. The Senegalese government began to institute a delayed payment system with its groundnut (peanut) farms. When farmers sold their harvest to the Senegalese government, they would get a voucher, known as a chit, which they could turn into cash after a three-month waiting period. Not wanting to wait for the Senegalese marketing system to pay them, more farmers began to smuggle their goods to Banjul, where the Gambian government paid in cash. An even greater issue for both countries was the ease with which violence could spread through the region. With shared ethnic communities on both sides of the border, a successful coup in one country could lead to a group of sympathizers in the other, bringing danger to the democratic regimes of both countries.

This fear was realized during the 1981 coup attempt to oust President Dawda Jawara of the Gambia. Though the coup attempt was not well organized and quickly fell apart, it resulted in a prolonged period of instability and violence in the Gambia, as the rebels released many criminals from prisons and armed them in hopes that they would support the uprising. Per an existing defense agreement, Jawara requested Senegal to help him in defeating the coup. The Senegalese government responded vigorously, sending hundreds or even thousands of soldiers and put down the insurrection. This strong reaction was probably motivated by Senegal's own security concerns; its pro-Western stance caused tensions with other African states, and it was feared that neighbouring countries might use the Gambia, secessionists in the Casamance region (the region of Senegal south of the Gambian border), or other dissident groups to destabilize the Senegalese government. Specific threats came from Moussa Traoré's Mali, Ahmed Sékou Touré's Guinea, João Bernardo Vieira's Guinea-Bissau, and Muammar al-Gaddafi's Libya. While the Senegalese government speculated about some dangers, in the late 1980s it had border skirmishes with Mauritania.

After the coup attempt in the Gambia, its government realized that its security forces were not adequate to stop or prevent political upheaval. Security of the region was becoming more and more difficult to maintain. The Gambia had previously lacked a proper army, instead solely relying on a police force, and subsequently began to set up its own military. Despite this, the Gambian government still felt the need to improve its position, and thus began to support a union with Senegal. This prospect also found renewed interest in Senegal. Léopold Sédar Senghor, first President of Senegal, was one of "les trois pères" ("the three fathers") of Negritude—a literary and ideologically socialist movement of pan-Africanism, encouraging Africans throughout the Diaspora to embrace their shared culture. Senghor's belief in Negritude informed the possibility of unification between Senegal and the Gambia, and fostered the belief that unification would happen as an organic process. In fact, Senegal and the Gambia had already commissioned a United Nations report to study the possible plans and benefits of unification between the two countries in the 1960s.

== Period of the Confederation ==
=== Union and early issues ===
In December 1981, Senegal and the Gambia signed an agreement to form a confederation which officially came into existence on 1 February 1982. The two countries agreed to unite their militaries, security forces, economies and monetary systems. Politically, Senegal and the Gambia maintained separate cabinets, though shared power in a confederate government, with a Senegalese serving as president and a Gambian serving as vice-president. In the short term, the Senegambia Confederation was a pragmatic union based on a mutual security interest. As noted, the Senegalese government feared national instability caused by uprisings in either the Gambia or the Casamance region. The attempted coup resulted in both countries' leaders promoting the unification ideas which had been developing in the region.

However, there were early issues in regards to the Senegambia Confederation. The new union proved to be "largely ceremonial" in many regards, and neither member state was satisfied with its conditions. Hughes and Lewis, in their Senegambia analysis, list many problems with unions which often lead to failure, which this union shared. Throughout the integration process, support came primarily from the two governments and their social elites; neither the Senegalese nor the Gambian people at large were particularly interested in integration. In addition, the Gambian government (and the Gambian people) began to fear losing their own power and identity through Senegalese engulfment.

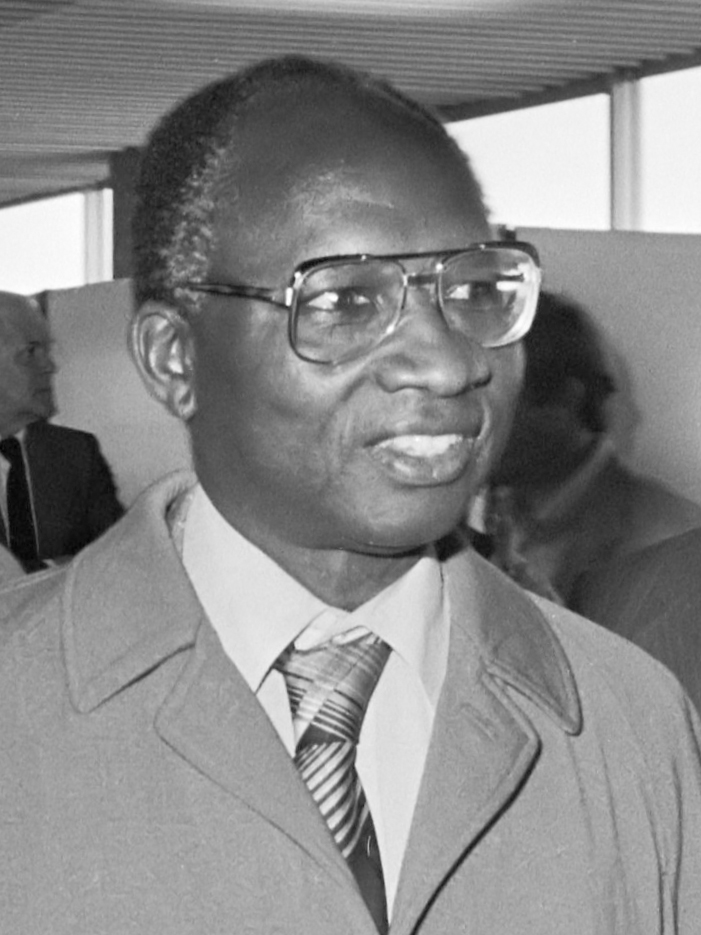
The Confederation's Gambian Vice-president, Dawda Jawara, had little interest in creating the Gambia Armed Forces, but his reliance on the Armed Forces of Senegal upset many Gambians.

One early problem was the integration of the security forces, as the Gambia still had no military. Gambian President Jawara, though initially supportive of the confederation, was much less enthusiastic about creating a Gambian army. The Senegalese government probably had to pressure him into organizing his own military, as it did not want to assume sole responsibility for the security of the Gambia. The Gambia finally created a military, in form of the Gambia National Army and Gambian National Gendarmerie, in 1983. In turn, parts of these new units became part of the Confederal Army which consisted of two-thirds Senegalese and one-third Gambian soldiers. As the Gambian government was reluctant to heavily invest in its military to match Senegal's security spending, the Confederal Army remained Senegalese-dominated and Gambians junior partners. Key positions in the Gambia such as the airport, harbor, and even the protection of Jawara himself thus remained the responsibility of Senegalese soldiers. Ironically, this caused opposition parties to claim that the confederation was threatening the Gambia's national sovereignty and economy.

=== Growing conflicts over economic issues and collapse ===
The greatest tensions grew in regards to economic issues. According to Arnold Hughes, the Gambians had two primary concerns: one was a reluctance to fully integrate economically, and the other worried that the Senegalese would opt for a unitary Senegambian state rather than a confederation. In general, the economic policies of the two states did not match well; whereas Senegal had traditionally favored a centralized, almost mercantilistic economy, the Gambia relied on free trade and low tariffs. In January 1984, Senegal proposed a customs and monetary union; it hoped that the confederation could be transformed into an economically united state, as they wanted to shut down the Gambian reexport trade and build a trans-Gambian highway and bridge to connect the rest of Senegal with its southern provinces. The Gambia opposed the customs union, and initially the monetary union as well. It saw the trans-Gambian highway and bridge project as a threat to its sovereignty and feared the loss of revenue generated by Gambian trade with Senegal's southern provinces as well as ferry services of the Gambia River. Ultimately, Senegal and the Gambia continued to compete economically instead of cooperating for the duration of the confederation.

The mounting tensions gradually undermined the confederation. Discussions about implementing a customs and monetary union continued to stall to the frustration of Senegal's government. In early 1986, an economic crisis and foreign exchange shortages seemed to push the Gambians to finally consider adopting the West African CFA franc, used by Senegal. The latter offered that its membership in the West African Monetary Union could be transferred to the Senegambia Confederation, so that both Senegal and the Gambia were automatically members. The Gambians rejected this, instead demanding that their country join the West African Monetary Union as an independent member. As a result of these differences, the monetary and customs union were never achieved. Around 1987, President Abdou Diouf greatly upset the Gambians when he declared in a speech that the Gambia had been an "accident of history".

Eventually, disputes erupted over the rotation of the confederal presidency. In August 1989, Senegal unilaterally pulled out its troops from the Gambia when it was threatened by Mauritania. The Gambia felt its interests were not being protected, and initiated legal measures to dissolve the union. The end came on 23 August 1989, when President Diouf decided it was best that the confederation be placed aside after the talks about a customs union remain fruitless. The eight-year Senegambia Confederation was one of the longest-lived African unions of the period.

=== Legacy ===
In the Gambia, the end of the confederation had little impact on the national economy, but considerably changed the local political and security situation. With the removal of the Senegalese troops, the Gambian government had to rely for the first time solely on its own military which was already internally divided and suffered from considerable unrest over favoritism and other issues. These problems resulted in repeated mutinies of Gambian soldiers and ultimately led to a coup d'état during which Yahya Jammeh overthrew Jawara.

In Senegal, the confederation's end resulted in worsening the living conditions of the Casamance region's population, as the latter had economically benefited from the union. This caused tensions which helped militant separatists, most importantly the Movement of Democratic Forces of Casamance (MDFC), to grow in strength and thus partially contributed to the outbreak of the armed Casamance conflict. After Jammeh took power in 1994, the Gambia began to provide substantial support to the MDFC insurgency.

The collapse of the confederation meant that the area's black market and large-scale smuggling continued; by 1990, estimates show that 20% of the Gambian groundnut market was from smuggled Senegalese crops. Smuggling became one of the major sources of income for the MDFC rebels. In 2020, Gambia was among the five largest global exporters of rosewood, despite declaring its own stocks close to extinction in the 2010s, thanks to timber illegally harvested in and smuggled from Casamance.

== Politics ==
=== Government ===
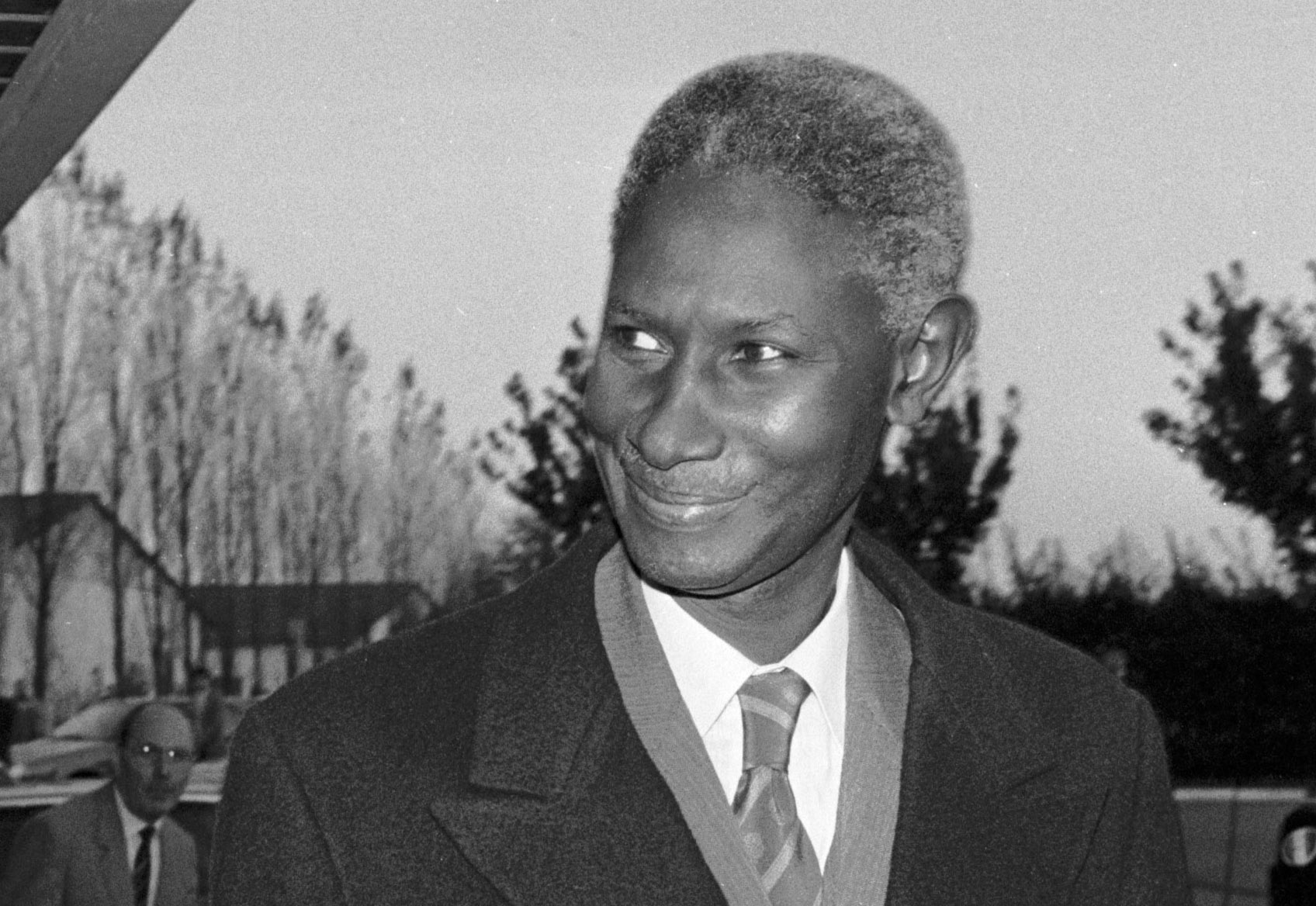
Abdou Diouf, President of the Senegambia Confederation, in 1988

Though Senegal and the Gambia maintained their own national governments, a confederate cabinet was also formed. Per the 1981 agreement, a Senegalese would always serve as the President and a Gambian as the vice-president of Senegambia. Both countries agreed to coordinate their defense and foreign policies. A confederal parliament and permanent secretariat were also organized; the former began meeting for one month annually from 1984. The Senegambia Permanent Secretariat was responsible for implementing the various agreements of the two countries.

In 1985, the Senegambian government consisted of the following individuals:

1. President Abdou Diouf (Senegalese)
2. Vice President Dawda Jawara (Gambian)
3. Minister of Defense Médoune Fall (Senegalese)
4. Minister of Economic Affairs Momodou S.K. Manneh (Gambian)
5. Minister of Finance Sheriff Saikula Sisay (Gambian)
6. Minister of Foreign Affairs Ibrahima Fall (Senegalese)
7. Minister of Information Djibo Leyti Kâ (Senegalese)
8. Minister of Security Ibrahima Wone (Senegalese)
9. Minister of Transportation Robert Sagna (Senegalese)
10. Deputy Minister of Foreign Affairs Lamin Kiti Jabang (Gambian)
11. Deputy Minister of Security Alieu Badji (Gambian)

=== Military ===
Senegambia Confederation relied on three militaries: The Confederal Army, the Senegalese military, and the Gambian military. While the latter two remained national forces, the Confederal Army was organized from 1983/84 as integrated force of the confederation. It was composed of two-thirds Senegalese and one-third Gambian soldiers, and supposed to deploy anywhere within the confederation. In the Gambia, the Confederal Army quickly assumed a position of prestige. As living costs were much higher in Senegal than the Gambia, the pay grade in the Senegalese military was higher than in the Gambian military. The Confederal Army's pay grade was adjusted to fit the Senegalese standards, meaning that Gambian troops in the Confederal Army were paid better than in the national Gambian military. The Confederal Army also had higher training standards than the Gambian military. As a result, positions in the Confederal Army were highly coveted among Gambians; selection officers exploited this to their own favor, leading to favoritism and corruption. Regardless of these issues, the Gambia never matched the resources or manpower invested by Senegal into the Confederal Army; the latter thus always remained dominated by Senegalese.

== See also ==
- The Gambia–Senegal relations
