= The Gambia–Senegal relations =

- Gambia: Senegal

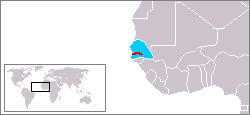

The Gambia–Senegal relations are foreign relations between the two neighbouring West African nations which are part of ECOWAS. A former British colony, the Gambia reached their independence in 1965, while Senegal gained their independence from France in 1960. Between 1982 and 1989 two countries tried to create Senegambia Confederation intended to promote cooperation and integration between the two closely related countries. Two countries share long common cultural heritage, languages and identities with differentiation streaming primarily from divergent British and French colonial experience. The Gambia forms a narrow semi-enclave strip surrounded by Senegal on all sides except for the western part, which is bordered by the Atlantic Ocean.

== History ==
First discussions on relations between the two countries took place in 1961, while The Gambia had not yet formally gained independence. In 1964, ahead of Gambian independence, the two countries commissioned the Van Mook study to explore options for uniting The Gambia and Senegal. The report proposed three possible models of reunification, but both states ultimately chose to remain independent. Instead, they formalized cooperation through a Treaty of Association, establishing the Senegalo-Gambian Permanent Secretariat and an Inter-Ministerial Committee. A year later, a joint defense and security agreement created a Joint Committee on Defence. In his address to the United Nations in 1965, Dawda Jawara emphasized the importance of maintaining close relations with Senegal for his country.

The Senegambia Confederation was a loose confederation that existed from 1982 to 1989 and consisted of the West African countries of Senegal and The Gambia, whose only neighboring country is Senegal. The confederation was established on 1 February 1982 (the treaty creating it was signed on 12 December 1981) with the aim of promoting greater cooperation between the two countries. The treaty was annulled by Senegal on 30 September 1989 after The Gambia refused to move toward a more integrated form of union. Almost every Gambian and Senegalese has relatives across the border. They speak the same languages and share a common cultural heritage. The countries became separated because they were part of different colonial empires, Britain and France.

The Gambia and Senegal are members of the Economic Community of West African States (ECOWAS). In 1990, the countries joined the ECOWAS program for the creation of unified armed forces, known as the Economic Community of West African States Monitoring Group (ECOMOG).

In April 2016, the countries signed a memorandum of understanding intended to improve bilateral relations. In April 2018, President of Senegal Macky Sall paid an official visit to Banjul, where he held talks with Gambian President Adama Barrow. The two sides agreed to open a new chapter in relations between the countries and to "build bridges instead of walls". In January 2019, a bridge over the Gambia River connecting the two countries was officially opened.

== See also ==
- Anglo-French Convention of 1889
- Casamance
- Foreign relations of the Gambia
- Foreign relations of Senegal
