= Viviane Ndour =

Senegalese pop singer

Viviane Chidid
- Viviane Chidid wearing a golden dress

Background information
- Born: Mbour, Senegal
- Genre: Mbalax
- Occupations: Recording artist, singer
- Labels: Jerry Wonda, Wonda Music, Jerry 'Wonder' Duplessis

Viviane (born Viviane Chidid) is a Senegalese pop singer who is the former backing vocalist and former sister-in-law of Youssou N'Dour. Viviane is known as the queen or reine of Senegalese music. Her music combines traditional Senegalese mbalax music with elements of U.S. rap, R&B and Country music. She released her first album in 1999 and formed a group called Le Jolof Band in 2001. Most of her songs are in either Wolof or English though a few are in French, the official language of Senegal. On March 31, 2012 the label Wonda Music of producer Jerry 'Wonder' Duplessis signed her to his recording label. Since then, Viviane has been working with Jerry Wonda and her album was released in 2015.

== Personal life ==
Chidid was born in Mbour, Senegal on 29 September 1973 to a Senegalese father and a Mauritanian mother. Her grandmother from her mother's side is from Mali. She was born Christian, but now she converted to Islam. Viviane got converted by Serigne Saliou Mbacke the son of Ahmadou Bamba in the early 90s. A few years later when she married her ex husband Bouba Ndour, the brother of Youssou Ndour, they had two children together Zeyna and Philippe.

== Albums and videos ==
As of 2009, Viviane currently had two albums actively selling on the market, in grocery stores and even in the shop in Senegal's airport. Those two albums were Bataclan Cafe (the most recent) and Man Diarra, which arrived in 2005.

Bataclan Cafe contains work recorded live in concert and her hit "Beggue Na Lenn" (meaning "love you all" in English) which she has a video for; receiving regular spins on Senegalese television in 2007. The hit single off the 2005 Man Diara album was "Kagna La Giss". In the song she sings vibrantly about missing her loved one, and dreaming and wishing of his return. Like many Wolof songs, and as tradition in music of the region, the song builds and builds to a climax and the final verse captures her giving shout-outs to various people. In 2010 she gained her first taste of international notoriety by doing a commercial for the Ritz cracker company where she can be heard singing her song "Ta Ta Viviane!"

Viviane signed to Wonda Music on March 31, 2012. She has been working with Grammy award-winning producer Jerry Wonda at Platinum Sound Recording Studios in New York City.

=== Other popular songs and videos ===
Other hit videos of her are tracks such as "Welcome to Africa" with Mokobe, and "Cheri Boy" in which we find Viviane blending hip-hop, R&B, Reggae, and traditional Senegalese sound in one track. The beat of the song has a soft, smooth reggae feel, the chorus is sung R&B style, and the verses are 16 bar raps like American style hip-hop.

=== Relationship to American music ===
A story that briefly details Ndour's relationship with American music is relayed by Likembe on his blog:

"It's said that the first time Viviane heard Aaliyah's "Are You That Somebody" she thought it was Americans copying Senegalese music."

== Live shows ==
While some of her songs may borrow American styles, Viviane still stays true to her roots as a Senegalese artist. In her live shows, the songs do not follow the usual 3- to 5-minute formats of American songs. She usually has a live band, and the drum work is provided in traditional fashion as a dancer will make movements responding naturally to whatever changes in rhythm the drummer may decide to make. Unscripted, whenever Ndour decides, she will again return to the song, but much of it is separated with interaction/ad libs with the audience.

== Accolades ==
=== Awards ===
- 2002 Kora Awards- Nominated
- 2011 AFROTAINMENT MUSEKE AFRICA MUSIC AWARDS- Winner
- 2012 Cameroon Entertainment Awards- Winner
- 2012 Nigerian Entertainment Awards- Winner
- 2012 Kora Awards- Nominated
- 2013 PORO AWARDS 2013 Abidjan World Music Festival- Winner
- 2016 WatsUp TV Africa Music Video Awards - Winner (Best African Female Video)

=== Nominations ===
- 2014 African Muzik Magazine Awards (Best Female West Africa) - (Nominated)
- 2012 Car Battery Awards (BEST) - Won

== Albums ==
- Entre Nous/Between us/Ci sunu biir: 1999
- Nature: 2000
- Le Show: 2001
- Tere Nelaw: 2002
- Fii ak Fee: 2003
- Viviane et Freres: 2004
- Man Diarra: 2005
- Bataclan Cafe: 2007
- Wuyayooy: 2010
- Retaan: 2014
- Wuyuma: 2016
- Benen Level: 2020
