= Yusupha Ngum =

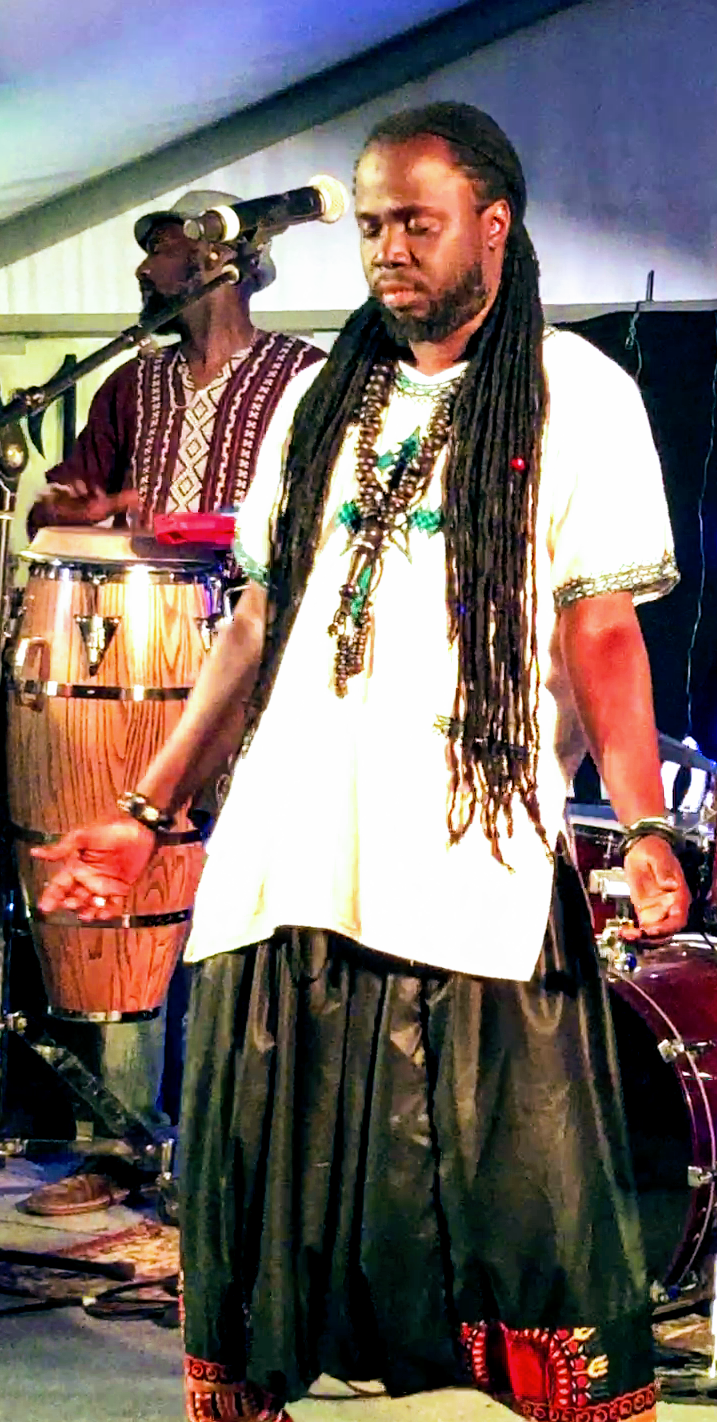
- Occupation(s): Singer, songwriter
- Notable work: Ndigal; Yaay Borom; Golden Jubilee
- Musical career
- Genres: Mbalax; jazz fusion; folk; world; rap

Yusupha Ngum is a singer and songwriter from Gambia, also known by the stage name "Joloffman". He has performed in a variety of styles, including mbalax, folk music, rap, jazz fusion, and Afro fusion music. Yusupha is currently based in Australia.

== Life ==
Yusupha's father was Musa Ngum (also often spelled "Moussa Ngom"). Musa Ngum was a griot, and a highly successful singer in Gambia and Senegal. Yusupha followed in the griot tradition of his father.

When he was growing up, Yusupha went to a Franco-Arab school in Senegal.

== Career ==
Yusupha started his music career by co-founding the rap band Galaxy Crew in 1998. With Galaxy Crew, Yusupha released three albums, Bamba (2000), Peace and Blessings (2001) and Toloff-Toloff (2004).

Yusupha started his solo career in 2005, where he shifted to creating mbalax music. As a solo artist, Yusupha released his first album in 2006, titled Ndigal.

In 2007, Yusupha went on a two-month tour of Sweden.

In 2009, Yusupha released his second solo album, titled Yaay Borom, which reached no. 3 on the Gambian album charts.

In 2015, Yusupha released his third solo album, Golden Jubilee, to celebrate the 50th year of Gambia's independence.

In 2013, Yusupha along with two partners formed the Australia-based trio Jaaleekaay. In 2016, Jaaleekaay released their self-titled album. In its review of the 2016 National Folk Festival, Scenestr described Jaaleekaay as "the band of the festival".

Yusupha is currently based in Melbourne, Australia, and is the lead singer of Yusupha Ngum and the Affia Band and was the original lead singer of the band Ausecuma Beats.

In 2018, Yusupha Ngum & the Affia Band recorded a song, "Gainde", to celebrate the Senegal team's qualification in the 2018 FIFA World Cup. The song was widely reported in the Gambian and Senegalese media.

In July 2018, Yusupha appeared as part of an ensemble shot on the cover of Beat Magazine, representing the band Ausecuma Beats.

After a performance at the Healesville Music Festival, the chair of the festival nominated the set by Yusupha Ngum & the Affia Band as one of the "stand out" performances, and named the band as one of three he listed as "among some of the big names that really pulled the crowds".

In 2019, Yusupha Ngum & the Affia Band included jazz fusion music in their repertoire at the Castlemaine Jazz Festival.

In 2019, Ausecuma Beats released their self-titled EP, and released their self-titled album in 2020, with Yusupha on lead vocals on every track except for one vocal track and one instrumental track. Yusupha Ngum left Ausecuma Beats in 2020.

== Accomplishments and awards ==
In 2009, Yusupha won the award for the "Most Radio Played Artist Male" category at the Gamspirit Music Awards.

In 2015, Yusupha was nominated for both the "Best Mbalax Artist" and "Best Traditional Artist" categories of the Purely Gambian Entertainment awards.

== Partial discography ==
=== Solo ===
Albums:

- 2006 Ndigal
- 2009 Yaay Borom (#3 Gambia album chart)
- 2015 Golden Jubilee

=== With Galaxy Crew ===
Albums:

- 2000 Bamba
- 2001 Peace and Blessings
- 2004 Toloff-Toloff

=== With Jaaleekaay ===
Albums:

- 2016 Jaaleekaay

=== With Yusupha Ngum & the Affia Band ===
Singles:

- 2018 Gaïndé

=== With Ausecuma Beats ===
Albums:

- 2019 Ausecuma Beats (EP)
- 2020 Ausecuma Beats (album)

Singles:

- 2019 Aida (#2 Amrap Metro Chart)
- 2020 Yelena
- 2020 Cherie

=== With Vellúa ===
Singles:

- 2019 Ibra Fall

== Partial videography ==
=== Solo ===
- Fans
- 2016 Fatou Remix
- 2017 Don Sa Bopp (with Jaliba Kuyateh and Tuti Sanyang)
- 2021 Maam Bamba Jerejeff (a capella)

=== With Galaxy Crew ===
- Mariama
- Fatou

=== With Yusupha Ngum & the Affia Band ===
- 2016 Taysito
- 2016 Citizens of this World
- 2018 Gaïndé
