= Sabar =

Traditional drum from Senegal

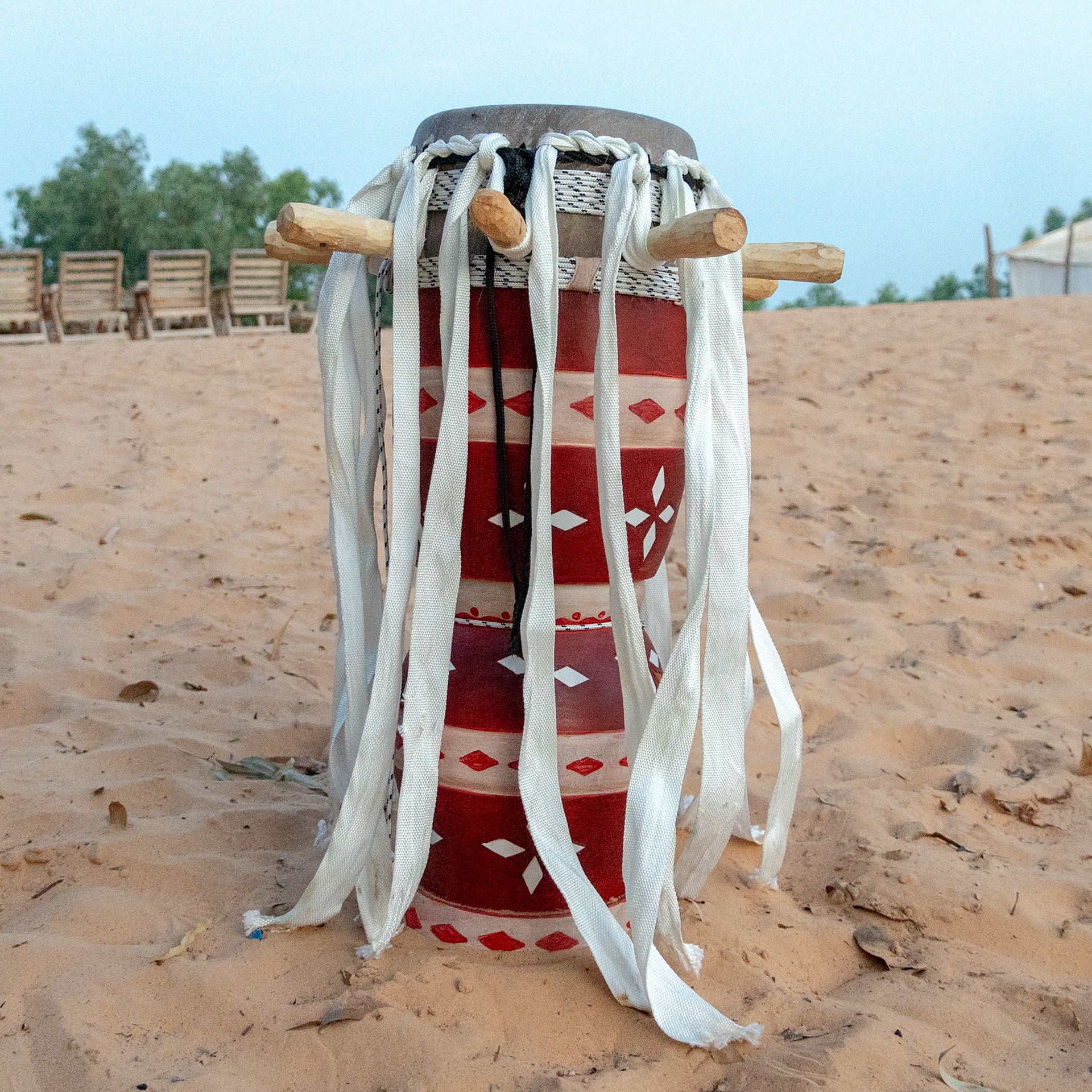
M'beng m'beng sabar skinned in the traditional method using pegs and "mes" or webbing

The sabar is a traditional drum from Senegal that is also played in Mauritania and The Gambia. It is associated with Wolof and Serer people.

The drum is generally played with one hand and one stick or "galan". There are many different kinds of sabar, each with a different sound and a different role in the ensemble. Some common forms of sabar are n'der, thiol, goron, m'beng m'beng, toungoné, and xiin.

The sabar is made from the wood of the dimb tree from the Senegambia region. The drums are carved by the laobé, or carvers, and generally skinned by the griot. The skinning process involves using goat skin and securing it with seven pegs, cord, and "mes" or webbing.

The "galan" is made of tamarind wood.

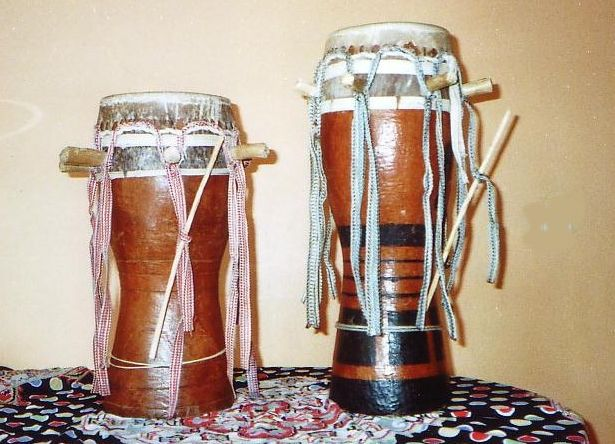
Two sabar drums from Senegal

Among its most renowned exponents was the Senegalese musician Doudou N'Diaye Rose.

Sabar is also recognized as a type of dance and the style of music played while using this drum. It is commonly performed at weddings and festivals, and other events. Men will play the drum (Saba) and the women will dance.

== Gallery ==
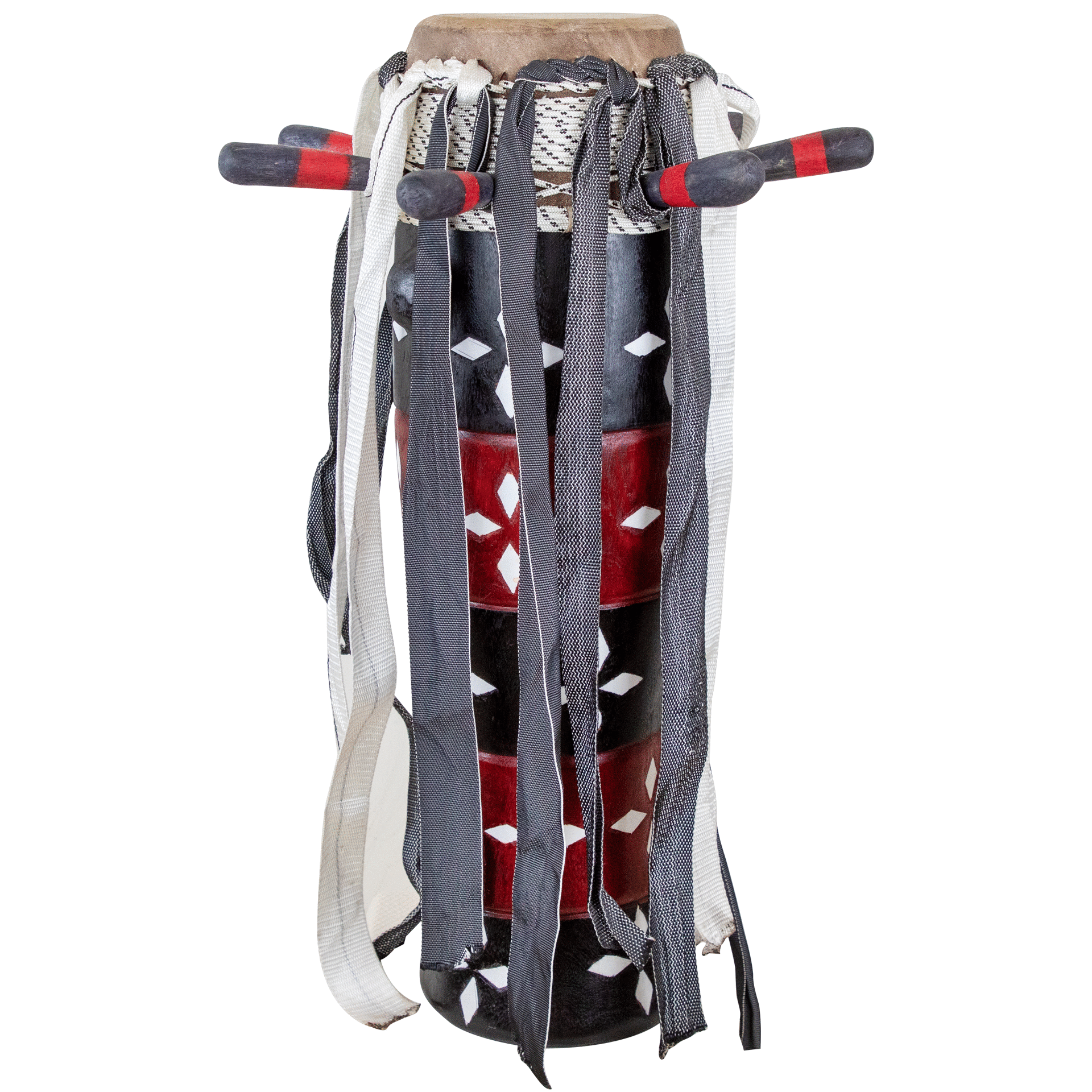
Goron sabar

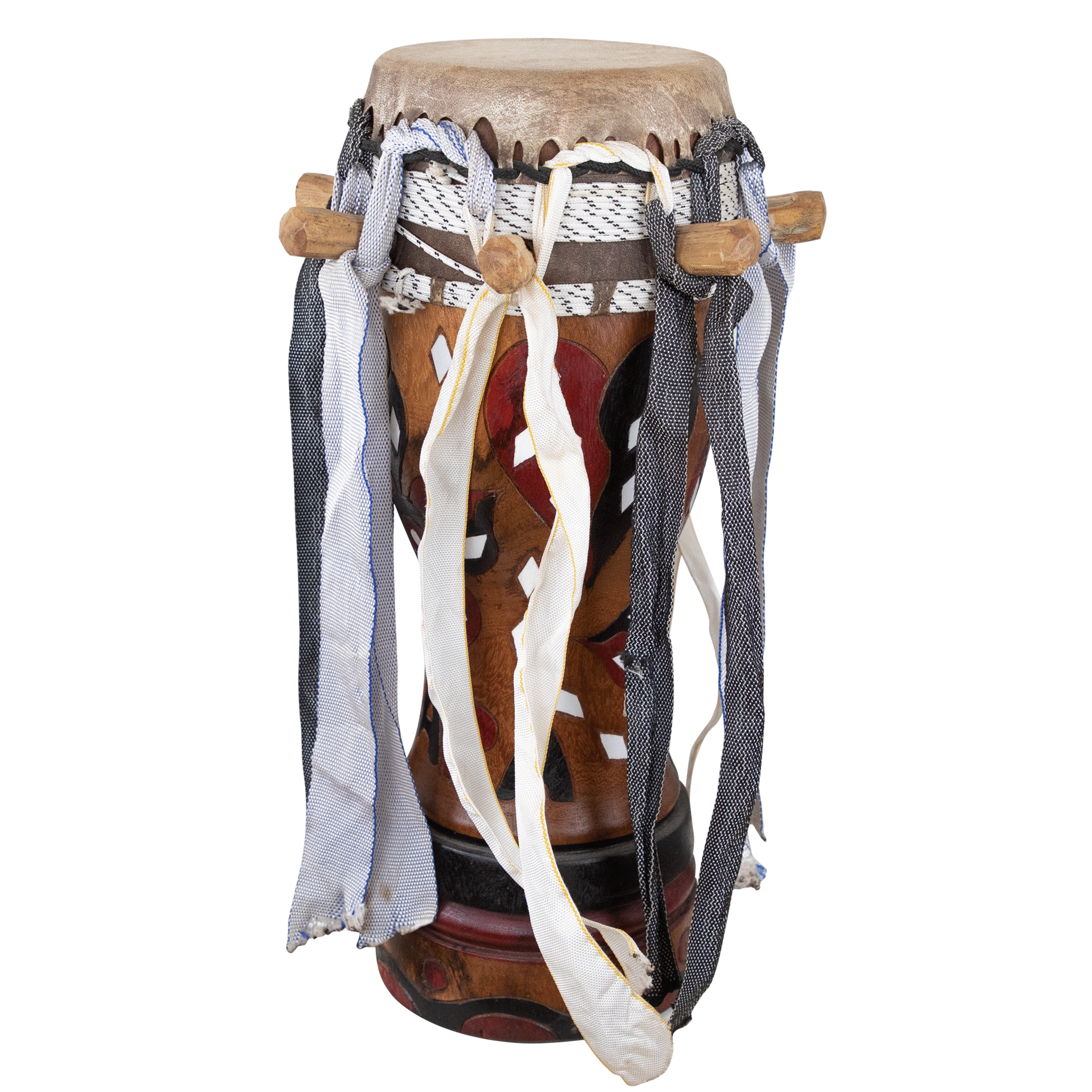
M'beng m'beng sabar

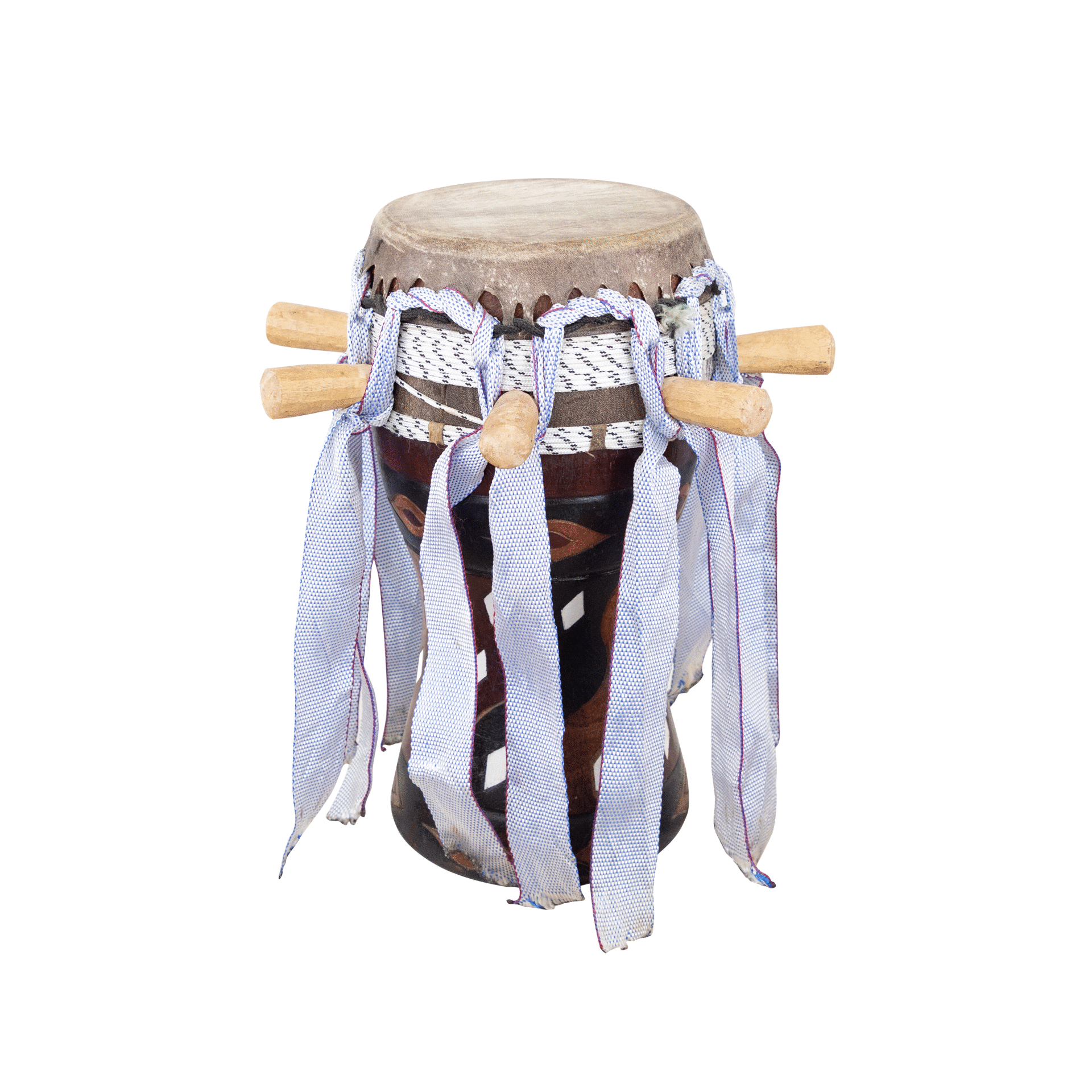
Toungoné sabar

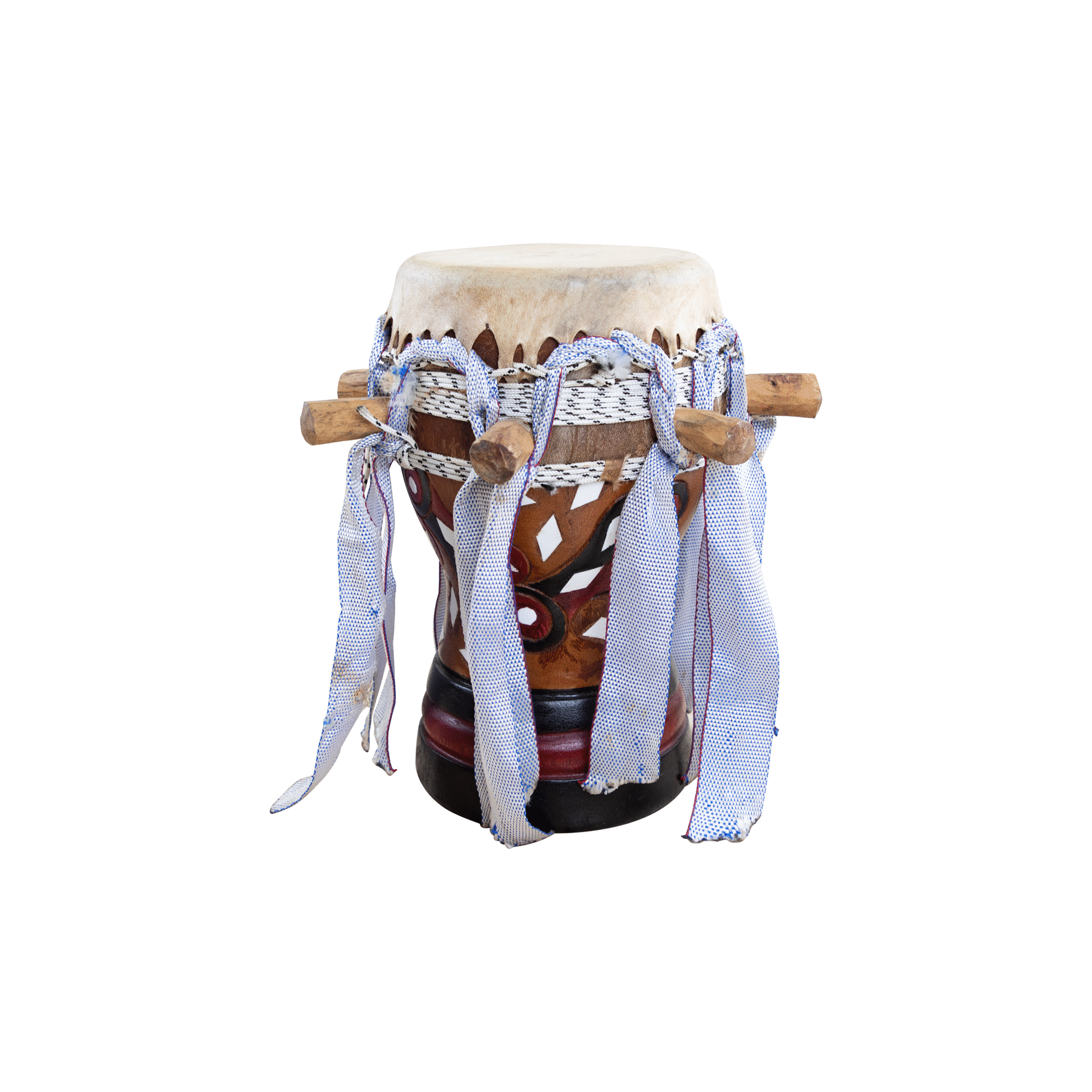
Kun sabar

== See also ==
- Jung-jung
- Mbalax
- Njuup
- Talking drum
