= Njuup =

Music genre

- Stylistic origins: Serer religion (Ndut rite of passage)
- Cultural origins: Ancient (religious)
- Typical instruments: Tama, Perngel, Lamb, Qiin (especially in the Woong or Xaat dance), Vocals, Sabar, Drum

Subgenres
- Mbalax

The Njuup tradition is a Serer style of music rooted in the Ndut initiation rite, which is a rite of passage that young Serers must go through once in their lifetime as commanded in the Serer religion.

== History ==
Njuup songs are religious in nature. For a large part of its history, Njuup was only used within the Ndut ritual. The history of Njuup comes from the older Ndut style of teachings. Young Serer boys in the ndut (nest) were required to create religious tunes during their rite of passage to take their minds off the transitional experience, build their aesthetic skills, and enhance their spirituality. The veneration of Serer Pangool influenced the songs of the Ndut, including Njuup.

Modern Senegambian artists who sing the purest form of Njuup in the Serer language include Rémi Jegaan Dioh and Yandé Codou Sène.

== Influence ==
Njuup is the progenitor of Mbalax music. Mbalax music originated when prominent Senegalese artists, such Youssou N'Dour, began to incorporate Njuup into their works Unlike Njuup, which is religious, Mbalax is party music. All Mbalax artists are strongly influenced by the Njuup tradition. Senegalese artists who specialize in Mbalax include Mbaye Dieye Faye, Youssou N'Dour, and Thione Seck.

== See also ==
- Mbalax
- Music of Senegal
- Junjung
- Talking drum
- Sabar
- Timeline of Serer history
- Serer ancient history
