= Pape Demba "Paco" Samb =

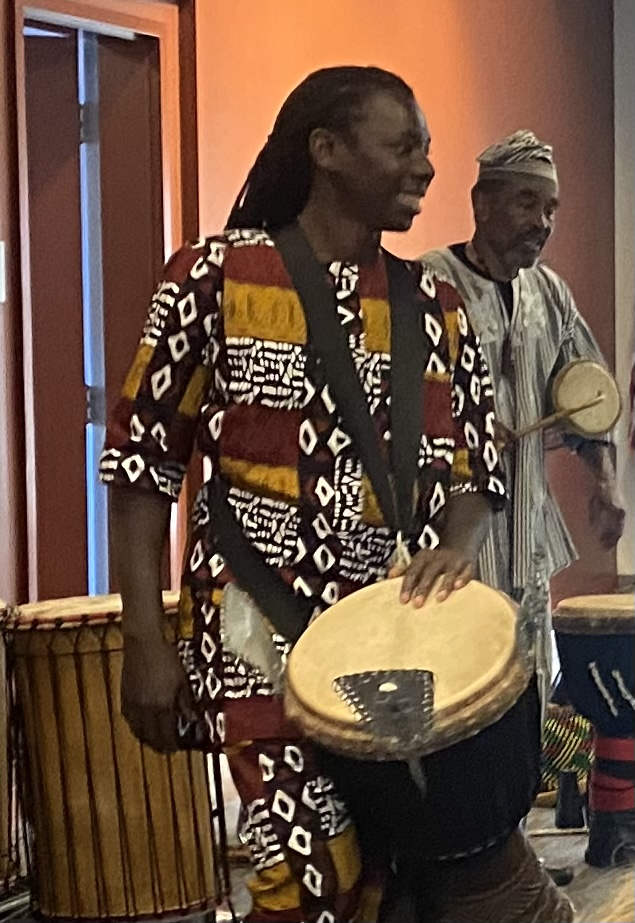
- Samb performing in Wilmington, Delaware, 2023.
- Born: 1976 (age 49–50); Dakar, Senegal
- Occupations: Griot; drummer; singer; dancer; storyteller
- Musical career
- Genres: Wolof music; Senegalese music
- Instruments: Djembe; dundun; sabar; conga; tama; vocals
- Member of: Super Ngewel Ensemble, McDaniel College's Student African Drum Ensemble (leader)
- Website: papedembasamb.com

Pape Demba "Paco" Samb is a Senegalese-American griot, hand drummer, storyteller, and educator of Wolof ancestry. Based in the United States, he performs throughout the country and has been described by the Delaware government as an "internationally acclaimed artist." Paco has performed with musicians of Senegal and the Gambia including Laba Sosseh, Musa Ngum, and Bala Sidibé.

Aside from performing, he leads drumming classes, workshops, and McDaniel College's Student African Drum Ensemble. Paco has stated his belief in his ability to instruct those "who have never touched a drum before."

Paco plays both traditional and contemporary Senegalese music as well as "reggae, rap, funk, jazz, pop and a variety of other styles."

His own band, the Super Ngewel Ensemble, "performs traditional Senegalese rhythms on authentic handmade instruments while incorporating dance and storytelling."

== Personal life ==
Pape Demba Samb was born in 1976 in Dakar, Senegal. He was born into the Samb griot family, who "have been the keepers of the ancestral history, stories, and music of his native Wolof peoples in Senegal for hundreds of years." His entire family is skilled in dance, drumming, singing, and storytelling. He began playing djembe when he was 7 years old and did not have a formal education in his youth.

In an unknown year, he married Karen Rege. As of 2023, Paco lives in Wilmington, Delaware.

== Musical performances ==
Circa 2013, Samb drummed in charity concerts for SOS Children's Villages in Chicago. The following year, Samb released his first album.

In a 2018 interview with Delaware Online, Paco described his mindset before each show:

I like to give people good energy through the drums and my African culture. Always, before a performance, I say to myself that I want to give the audience love and make them happy.

== Educating ==
=== McDaniel College ===
In 2016, Paco was invited to instruct "Global Drumming Traditions," a course on drumming at McDaniel College in Westminster, Maryland. The original instructor had fallen ill, and McDaniel's music department head Robin Armstrong asked her friend Karen Rege if her husband Paco could step in to lead the course. Paco agreed to join the Maryland campus even though it was "two hours from his Delaware home," so he hosted a weekly 90-minute course, instead of three-hour sessions typical to the school.

Rege and four instructional designers retrofitted the course to be a better match for Paco; due to English being his second language, the new course "prioritized action over words" and encouraged students to devote the entire lesson time to ensemble practise, refining their drumming technique at home. At the end of the course, students were required to film themselves playing the drum to monitor their progress. This was titled the "double-flip model" (a reference to the flipped classroom).

The new course format was successful; the school reported that "[attendance] during the first semester of the new format was more than 95 percent, and the instructor tallied a 98 percent on-time submission rate for assignments. When registration for the second semester began, both 15-student sections filled up in a day and a half, and several students reached out to Rege asking to get on the waitlist."

=== Other classes ===
In 2022, Paco taught "West African rhythms via hands-on bucket drumming" during The Grand Opera House's Summer in the Parks series in Wilmington, Delaware.

Throughout February 2023, the Oxford Arts Alliance collaborated with Paco to lead a "drumming masterclass" as well as performing as part of an ongoing exhibit series in Oxford, Pennsylvania.
