= Set (Youssou N'Dour album) =

Studio album by Youssou N'Dour
- Released: 1990
- Genre: Mbalax
- Label: Virgin
- Producer: Michael Brooks

Youssou N'Dour chronology
| The Lion (1989) | Set (1990) | Eyes Open (1992) |

Set is an album by the Senegalese musician Youssou N'Dour, released in 1990. The album in part inspired the Senegalese youth movement Set-Setal, which sought to beautify Dakar.

The album peaked at No. 1 on the Billboard World Albums chart. Virgin Records was disappointed by the album's commercial performance, and dropped N'Dour shortly after the album's release.

== Production ==
The album was made with N'Dour's band, Super Étoile de Dakar. It was recorded live in the studio, in Paris, and was produced by Michael Brooks (with Daniel Lanois working on one track). Set was originally intended for release only in Senegal; after becoming a hit, it was slightly remixed and distributed internationally. The lyrics are sung in Wolof, with a few phrases in English.

== Critical reception ==
Professional ratings
Review scores
| Source | Rating |
|---|---|
| AllMusic | 5/5 stars |
| Chicago Tribune | 4/4 stars |
| Robert Christgau | A− |
| The Encyclopedia of Popular Music | 2/5 stars |
| Houston Chronicle | 4/4 stars |
| The Philadelphia Inquirer | 3/4 stars |
| The Rolling Stone Album Guide | 4/5 stars |
| Select | 3/5 medals |

The Washington Post praised the "exuberant, universal love songs like 'Fenene' and 'Ay Chono La'." Robert Christgau deemed the album "13 shortish songs replete with catchy intros, skillful bridges, concise solos, hooks." The Gazette wrote that the album "has moments of brilliance, a glorious fusion of old-and new-world thinking." The Boston Globe singled out "Sinebar", declaring that it possesses "one of the catchiest, most exhilarating horn riffs in pop music this or any year." Jon Pareles, in The New York Times, listed it as the third best album of 1990.

Trouser Press called Set "one of the best Afropop albums ever," writing that "'Sabar' and 'Sinebar' show off the band’s relentless percussive chops."

== Track listing ==
| No. | Title | Length |
|---|---|---|
| 1. | "Set (Clean)" | 3:45 |
| 2. | "Alboury" | 4:15 |
| 3. | "Sabar" | 2:32 |
| 4. | "Toxiques" | 3:28 |
| 5. | "Sinebar" | 4:45 |
| 6. | "Medina" | 3:22 |
| 7. | "Miyoko" | 3:43 |
| 8. | "Xaley Rewmi (Our Young People)" | 4:17 |
| 9. | "Fenene (Another Place)" | 5:17 |
| 10. | "Fakastalu (Watch Your Step)" | 3:52 |
| 11. | "Hey You!" | 3:38 |
| 12. | "One Day (Jaam)" | 3:26 |
| 13. | "Ay Chono La" | 3:13 |

== Personnel ==
- Youssou N'Dour – vocals
- Ouzin Ndiaye – vocals
- Habib Faye – bass guitar, keyboards
- Assane Thiam – tama
- Mbaye Dieye Faye – sabar
- Jimi Mbaye – guitar
- Pape Oumar Ngom – guitar
- Ibou Cisse – keyboards, guitar
- Galass Niang – drums
- Thierno Koite – alto saxophone
- Issa Cissokho – tenor saxophone
