= Pyeng Threadgill =

American singer-songwriter (born 1977)

- Born: November 14, 1977 (age 48); New York City, U.S.
- Genres: Blues, soul blues, jazz
- Occupations: Singer, songwriter, record producer
- Instrument: Vocals
- Years active: 2000s–present

Pyeng Dubra Threadgill (born November 14, 1977) is an American blues, jazz and soul blues singer, songwriter, and record producer. Her father is the bandleader and composer, Henry Threadgill, and her mother is Christina Jones, a dancer and choreographer. Threadgill has released three albums, beginning in 2004 with Sweet Home: Pyeng Threadgill Sings Robert Johnson.

== Early life and education ==
Threadgill was born on the Lower East Side of Manhattan to parents Henry Threadgill and Christina Jones, a founding member of the dance group Urban Bush Women. She attended the Oberlin Conservatory of Music studying classical music and graduating with a BA in Music. Keen on a career as a singer, she was cast in her teenage years in avant-garde dance and theater. Threadgill stated, "I remember one of my close friends and I used to make a game of seeing who could write a song fastest." She was awarded the Mellon Fellowship to study music in Brazil.

== Career ==
In 2004, Threadgill obtained her first recording contract and released her debut album, Sweet Home: Pyeng Threadgill Sings Robert Johnson, via the independent record label, Random Chance Records. The album contained covers of 11 Robert Johnson songs, all set in different musical genres. Threadgill stated at the time that "I wanted each song to be different; otherwise what would be the point?" A year later, her second album Of The Air, included a cover of the Cure's "Close to Me". She followed the release with a tour of Europe. She performed regularly at various New York venues before relocating to Berkeley, California.

Threadgill has headlined the Fillmore Jazz Festival's Ellis Street stage, and appeared at the Montreal Jazz Festival, the Detroit Institute of The Arts, and the Sun Side Jazz Club in Paris, France. In 2006, Threadgill was a featured player in a documentary film starring Youssou N'Dour, entitled Retour à Gorée and directed by Pierre-Yves Borgeaud.

After several years of performing and raising her daughter, Threadgill wrote and developed a work based on short stories by authors including Jamaica Kincaid and Bruno Schulz. The song cycle, entitled Portholes to a Love & Other Short Stories, led to her being granted a 2008 Fellowship in music composition through the New York Foundation for the Arts. It became the basis of her third album, self-released in 2009. In 2010, Threadgill performed at the Clifford Brown Jazz Festival.

Since then, Threadgill has explored other musical-based interests including work with the pianist Marc Cary, as well as theater projects.

== Discography ==
=== Albums ===
| Year | Title | Record label |
|---|---|---|
| 2004 | Sweet Home: Pyeng Threadgill Sings Robert Johnson | Random Chance Records |
| 2005 | Of The Air | Random Chance Records |
| 2009 | Portholes to a Love & Other Short Stories | Stray Dog Music |

== See also ==
- List of electric blues musicians
