= Balla Sidibé =

Senegalese singer, bandleader, percussionist, vocalist and composer (1942-2020)

Background information
- Birth name: Balla Sidibé
- Born: 1942
- Origin: Casamance, Senegal
- Died: July 29, 2020 (aged 77–78)
- Occupation(s): Singer vocalist percussionist bandleader composer
- Instrument(s): Percussion, vocals
- Years active: 1970-2020
- Labels: World Circuit

Balla Sidibé (1942 – July 29, 2020) was a Senegalese singer, bandleader, percussionist, vocalist and composer. A founding member of the popular vocal group Orchestra Baobab, Sidibé was responsible for composing many of the band's best known standards and is regarded by many, as the giant of African music.

== Biography ==
Sidibé was born in the Casamance, Senegal in 1942. He abandoned an earlier career with the police force to become a musician and started performing around Dakar, the capital of Senegal in the mid-60s where he started his career. In 1970, Sidibé met with the other front men of The Orchestra Baobab at the Baobab Club in Dakar where they started as a house band.

During his long career as a musician, he collaborated with Balla et ses Balladins, Youssou N'Dour, Bembeya Jazz National, Keletigui et ses Tambourinis, and Aurelio Martínez. Sidibé has been credited for composing and arranging many of the Orchestra Baobab studio albums like Pirate's Choice, Specialist in All Styles, Authenticité/The Syliphone Years, Vol. 1, A Night at Club Baobab, La Belle Epoque, Vol. 2, La Belle Epoque, Tribute to Ndiouga Dieng, and La Belle Epoque, Vol. 3: 1973-1976. He was signed to World Circuit Records before his death in 2020.

== Death ==
On July 29, 2020, World Circuit Records and Orchestra Baoba announced the death of Sidibé on Twitter. According to the band, he was rehearsing new material with the group a day before his death. He died in Dakar, Senegal.
