= Clifford Brown Jazz Festival =

Music festival in Wilmington, Delaware, US

Coordinates: 39.745831°N 75.547028°W

The Clifford Brown Jazz Festival is a free jazz music festival held annually in June at Rodney Square in Wilmington, Delaware, US. The first festival was held in 1989 on the open lawn in the center of the city, and has grown into the largest free jazz festival on the East Coast. The event is held to keep alive the memory of Clifford Brown, who died in a traffic accident in 1956 along with pianist Richie Powell. Pieces written by Brown and tribute pieces (like Benny Golson's "I Remember Clifford") are often played. Some acts have been staged at the Winterthur Museum, Garden and Library, where a fee was charged.

== Past acts ==
2024

- Jonathan Michel: Black Wonder's Quintet
- Chief Adjuah (formerly Christian Scott)
- Sarah Hanahan Quartet
- Linda May Han Oh
- Joshua Redman Group featuring Gabrielle Cavassa
- Dwonztet
- Dupont Brass
- Incognito
- Momentum
- Endea Owens and The Cookout
- Grace Kelly
- Clifford Brown Festival Orchestra featuring Wycliffe Gordon
- Adam Blackstone Presents The Legacy Experience
- Raheem DeVaughn
- Kelly Price

2023

- Marquis Hill Quartet
- Monty Alexander
- Angelique Kidjo
- Lao Tizer
- Dayramir Gonzalez
- Cory Wong
- Keyon Harrold
- Melani Fiona
- KEM
- Clifford Brown Festival Orchestra
- Mark Guiliana
- Hiromi Sonicwonder
- Jason Moran and Harlem Hellfighters
- Kamasi Washington

2022

- Boysie Lowery Living Jazz Residency
- Joe Chambers
- Rayford Griffin
- Stanley Clarke
- Cintron
- David Sanchez
- Chucho Valdés and Paquito D'Rivera
- Ernest Stuart w/ THR3ZUS
- Maysa
- Stokley
- Regina Carter
- Tony "Big Cat" Smith Band
- Spartan Alumni Band
- Lynn Riley and The World-Mix
- Immanuel Wilkins
- Rebirth Brass Band

2021

- Terell Stafford
- Jazzmeia Horn
- Kirk Whalum
- Malina Moye
- Lakecia Benjamin
- Eric Benet
- Webb Thomas and the Grover Washington Experience
- Gerald Veasley
- Dianne Reeves
- Clifford Brown Festival Orchestra
- Chien Chien Lu
- Jane Bunnett and Maqueque
- Terri Lynn Carrington and Social Science
- Jennifer Hartswick and Nick Cassarino Duo
- Kenny Barron
- Boysie Lowery Living Jazz Residency Graduate Concert
- Pieces of a Dream Academy of Dance
- Wilmington Ballet
- Dara Meredith, "Bridge of our Roots"
- Raphael Xavier - The Musician and the Mover

2020

- Arturo Stable Quartet
- Sharon Sable Quintet
- Cintron
- Gerald Chavis Quintet
- Mike Boone Quartet
- Barbara Walker
- Johnathan Barber & Vision Ahead
- Vertical Current

Raye Jones Avery - Voices For Healing

- Terra Soul Project
- Dennis Fortune
- The Whitney Project
- Korey Riker Band
- Fostina Dixon & Winds Of Change
- Jeff Bradshaw Band

2019

- Jeff Bradshaw & Friends
- Jamison Ross
- Etienne Charles & Creole Soul
- Alfredo Rodriguez
- Spanish Harlem Orchestra
- Pablo Batista w/ Nestor Torres
- The Jenkins Project
- Christian Scott
- Norman Brown's Summer Storm
- Fostina Dixon & the Winds of Change
- Mwenso & the Shakes
- Raye Jones Avery & Adagio
- Kendrick Scott
- Terrence Blanchard & E Collective
- Branford Marsalis

2018

- Laila Biali
- Matthew Whitaker
- The Clifford Brown Tribute Big Band with Gerald Chavis featuring Ernie Watts
- Miguel Zenon Quartet
- Jane Bunnett and Maqueque
- Arturo Sandoval
- The Lao Tizer Band featuring Chieli Minucci, Eric Marienthal & Karen Briggs
- Deva Mahal SPECIAL GUEST BRIAN MCKNIGHT
- Sammy Miller and The Congregation
- Sara Lazarus
- Scott Tixier
- Sidewalk Chalk
- Marcus Miller

2017

- Clifford Brown Tribute Band
- Alicia Olatuja
- Theo Crocker
- Karen Rodriguez
- Danilo Perez Trio
- Arturo O'Farrill Afro-Cuban Jazz Ensemble
- High & Mighty Brass Band
- Frederic Yonnet
- Marsha Ambrosius
- Wilmington Youth Jazz Band
- Rob Zinn
- Sumi Toonoka
- Somi
- Regina Carter

2016

- Wilmington Youth Jazz Band
- Maya Bellardo
- Delaware Jazz All Stars
- Miles Jaye
- Marcus Johnson
- The Ultimate Clifford Brown Tribute Band
- Best Kept Soul
- Miguel Orlando Band
- Adriel Gonzalez Band
- Aniya Jazz
- Nadjah Nicole
- Andra Day
- Robert Glasper Trio
- Saul Rubin Trio Feat. Leslie
- Valery Ponomarev Big Band
- Dr. Lonnie Smith
- Euge Groove
- Kim Waters

2015

- Jackie Brown Jazz@a Band
- Clifford Brown Trumpet Consortium
- Aniya Jazz
- Denise Montana w/Ray Drummond – Bass, Sharp Radway – Pno, Shirazette Tinnen -Drums,

Jermey Pelt – Trmpt, Jason Curry – Sax, Leon Jordan, Jr – Trmpt, Daniel Bauerkemper – Sax, Wayne Escoffery – Sax, Jason Marshall – Baritone Sax, Robin Eubanks – Trombone

- Edgardo Cintron & The Cintron Band
- Tito Puente, Jr. Orchestra
- John “Sax” Williams
- Point Blank
- Leela James
- Norman Conners
- Pieces Of A Dream
- Jeff Lorber Fusion w/Eric Marienthal, Chuck Loeb, Jimmy Haslip & Khari Parker

2014

- The Brownie-Roach Project
- Dianne Schuur
- Lynn Riley
- Latin Jazz All-Stars: A Tribute to Dave Valentin
- Amel Larruiex
- Mindi Abair
- Aniya Jazz
- Jawanza Kobie
- Habana Sax
- Brian Culbertson

2013

- Benny Golson Quartet
- United Trumpet Summit - featuring: Randy Brecker, Dr. Eddie Henderson, Dave Douglas & Riley Mullins
- Jessy J
- Buster Williams Quartet “Something More.” with Patrice Rushen, Cindy Blackman Santana and Stefon Harris
- To the Maxx
- BWB - Rick Braun, Kirk Whalum and Norman Brown
- JD3
- The W. E. S. Group
- Pedrito Martinez Group
- Lalah Hathaway

2012

- Monty Alexander
- All-Star Tribute to Lionel Hampton featuring Jason Marsalis, Candido, Robin Eubanks, Kevin Mahogany and Russell Gunn
- Claudio Roditi Septet
- Randy Weston's African Rhythms
- Steve Wilson: Bird with Strings
- Christian McBride Big Band
- Winston Byrd Quintet
- Ernie Watts Quartet
- Valerie Capers
- Jane Monheit with special guest Mark O'Connor
- Aaron Walker & Spiritual Rhythms
- All These Miles: The Arpeggio Jazz Ensemble plays the music of Miles Davis
- Hiromi: The Trio Project with Anthony Jackson & Simon Phillips
- Dee Dee Bridgewater

2011

- Junior Mance Quintet
- Manifest 3
- Ninety Miles
- Avery Sharpe Quintet
- Soul of Summer
- Ronny Jordan Full Band
- Take 6
- Tizer
- The Metta Quintet
- Rufus Reid's Out Front Quintet
- Rene Marie
- Captain Black's Big Band

2010

- John Pizarelli Swing Seven
- Champian Fulton
- Jerry Gonzales and the Fort Apache Band
- Omar Sosa Afreecanos Quartet
- Ravi Coltrane
- Cindy Blackman
- Marcus Miller and Christian Scott, "Tutu Revisited"
- USAF Satellite Ensemble
- Chick Corea Freedom Band
- Pyeng Threadgill
- Fostina Dixon and Winds Of Change
- Tony Williams Ensemble
- Mark Williams Quintet
- Jose Carmona III

2009

- Kombu Kombo
- Roy Haynes and the Fountain of Youth Band
- Jason Moran
- Jazz Attack
- Kem
- Javon Jackson and Les McCann
- The Bad Plus
- Odean Pope Saxophone Choir
- Dumpstafunk
- Pete Escovedo
- Bio Ritmo
- Burnt Sugar, the Chamber Archestra

2008

- Trio 3
- Helen Sung Group
- George Duke
- Crittenden
- Suzette Ortiz Jazz Ensemble
- Steve Turre and Sanctified Shells
- U of D Jazz Camp Graduates
- Dr. Guy's Musiqology
- Jumpin' Off A Cleff
- Huascar Barradas
- Raw Sugar Quintet
- Atiba's Dream
- David Sanborn Group
- Hiromi's Sonic Bloom
- Rashid Ali's Quintet
- Clifford Brown Tribute Band featuring Terell Stafford
- Maria Schneider Orchestra
- Dirty Dozen Brass Band
- Bonerama
- Barbara Walker
- Point Blank
- Mingus Big Band

2007

- The Mahavishnu Project
- Skerik's Maelstrom Trio
- The Blue Method
- The Rhythm Council featuring Henry Butler & Papa Mali
- Big Chief Bo Dollis and the Wild Magnolias
- The Ed Palermo Big Band
- The New Mastersounds
- Jean Luc Ponty
- Norman Brown's Summer Storm featuring Peabo Bryson, Jeff Lorber and Marion Meadows
- Sherry Winston
- Rob Swanson Quintet
- Stanley Clarke
- Wallace Roney (replaced Freddie Hubbard) and the New Jazz Composers Octet
- Elegua
- Aquiles Báez
- Afghan Jazz Project
- Metta Jazz Quintet

2006

- Count Basie Orchestra
- Edward Simon
- Crimson Jazz Trio
- Rebirth Brass Band
- Wade in the Water Tour: Bill Summers, Troy Andrews, Mark Brooks, Jamal Batiste, Davell Crawford, Leon Brown, Donald Harrison, Shaka Zulu, Frenchy Frechette
- Sandy Graham
- The Tiptons
- McCoy Tyner Trio
- The RAW Sugar Quintet
- Pucho and His Latin Soul Brothers
- Fortune Vinson Cruse
- Jae Sinnett
- John Pizzarelli
- Curtis Fuller
- Smithsonian Jazz Masterworks Orchestra
- Rayford Griffin
- Wilby Fletcher, Jr.
- Duke Ellington's Sacred Concert

2005

- JazzReach Hangin' With the Giants
- Concert of Sacred Music featuring Duke Ellington's Sacred Music
- Michael Wolff and Impure Thoughts
- Diane Schurr featuring Dave Sammuels' Caribbean Jazz Project
- Karl Denson's Tiny Universe
- The Funky Meters
- Chris Brubeck's Triple Play
- The Headhunters
- Ingrid Jensen and Project O
- Lou Donaldson and Dr. Lonnie Smith
- Flora Purim and Airto Moriera
- Poncho Sanchez Latin Jazz Band
- JazzChords of Calloway
- Council of Jazz Advocates Wilmington Youth Jazz Band
- Kennedy Center Betty Carter Jazz Ahead Graduates
- Sherrie Maricle and The DIVA Jazz Orchestra with Rachael Price
- Irvin Mayfield and the New Orleans Jazz Orchestra
- Judith Owen
- Louis Hayes and the Cannonball Adderley Legacy Band
- Hugh Masekela

2004

- T.S. Monk
- Dave Valentin/Hiltin Ruiz Latin Jazz Project
- David Sanchez
- Ahmad Jamal
- Ceceilia Smith and Jay Hoggard
- Big Bad Voodoo Daddy
- Jimmy McGriff
- Stefon Harris and Blackout
- Regina Carter and Del Symphony
- Cassandra Wilson
- Lincoln Center's Afro-Latin Jazz Orchestra

2003

- Roy Hargrove
- Terrell Stafford
- Randy Brecker
- David Weiss
- The Preservation Hall Jazz Band
- Barbone Street Jazz Band
- Arturo Sandoval
- Rolando Matias and Afro-Rican Ensemble
- Kenny Barron
- Greg Osby
- The Masters of Groove
- Lalah Hathaway
- Herbie Hancock with The Delaware Symphony Orchestra
- Wynton Marsalis/Lincoln Center Jazz Orchestra

2002

- Cab Calloway Orchestra
- Claudia Acuna
- Onaje Allan Gumbs Septet
- Take 6
- Nnenna Freelon
- Omar Sosa Octet
- Robert Jospe
- The Langston Hughes Project-Ask Your Momma
- Terrence Blanchard with the Delaware Symphony Orchestra
- Nestor Torres
- John Scofield
- Bootsie Barnes Quintet

2001

- The Afro-Rican Ensemble
- The Navigators
- Chuck Mangione
- Fred Hughes Trio
- Barbone St. Jazz
- Fortune Vinson Cruse
- Melissa Walker
- Airmen of Note
- Branford Marsalis
- Cintron
- Lenora Zenzalai Helm
- Groove Collective

2000

- Ingrid Jensen
- Nicholas Payton's Louis Armstrong Centennial
- Regina Carter
- Joshua Redman
- Stefon Harris
- Dianne Reeves
- Cecila Smith
- Mary Kadderly
- Cyrus Chestnut
- Clarence “Gatemouth” Brown Big Band
- Michael Brecker
- McCoy Tyner with Michael Brecker

1999

- Lou Donaldson Quartet
- The Jazz Messengers: The Legacy of Art Blakey
- Benny Golson and Randy Brecker
- Steve Turre and Mulgrew Miller
- Buster Williams and Carl Allen
- Nnenna Freelon
- Gonzolo Rubalcaba Trio
- Alex Bugnon
- Najee
- Earl Klugh
- Patti Austin
- David Sanborn
- Ivan Lins
- !Cubanisimo!

1998

- Dizzy: The Man and His Music
- Featuring: Ignacio Berroa, Cyrus Chestnut
- Jon Faddis, Slide Hampton
- Antonio Hart and John Lee
- Pat Martino
- Nancy Wilson
- Heads Up Super Band: Kenny Blake, Joe McBride and Gerald Veasley
- The Rippingtons with Russ Freeman
- Joyce Cooling
- Gato Baribieri
- Lee Ritenour
- Clarence Fountain and the Five Boys
- Staple Singers

1997

- Stanley Clarke
- Spyro Gyro
- Roy Hargrove
- Ramsey Lewis
- Jonathan Butler
- 4th World with Flora Purim and Airto
- Marlena Shaw
- Kevin Mahogany
- Tom Grant
- Manny Oquendo and Libre
- Edgando Cintron and Tiempo Noventa
- United Nations Jazz Orchestra
- Paquito d’Rivera

1996

- Sonny Rollins
- Betty Carter
- Terrence Blanchard
- Boney James
- Norman Brown
- Poncho Sanchez
- Tania Maria
- Rick Braun
- Keiko Matsui
- Bela Fleck and The Flecktones
- Tuck and Patti

1995

- Clark Terry
- T.S. Monk
- Geri Allen
- Wallace Roney
- Randi Crawford
- Pieces of A Dream
- Hiroshima
- The Caribbean Jazz Project
- Randy Brecker and Denis DiBlasio
- Mario Grigorov
- John Mayall and the Bluesbreakers
- KoKo Taylor and Her Blues Machine

1994

- Raye-Avery Jones
- Judith Kay with First State Ensemble
- Wayne Krantz
- The Duke's Men – Former members of Duke Ellington's Orchestra
- Dave Schiff and Quartet
- Harry Spencer and Vaneisa

1993

- Lou Rawls and Band
- Ray Baretto Jazz Ensemble
- Angela Bofill
- Benny Golson and The All Star Band featuring Helen Merrill
- The Joe Harris Jazz Quartet
- The Lionel Hampton Big Band
