= Orchestra Baobab =

Senegalese band

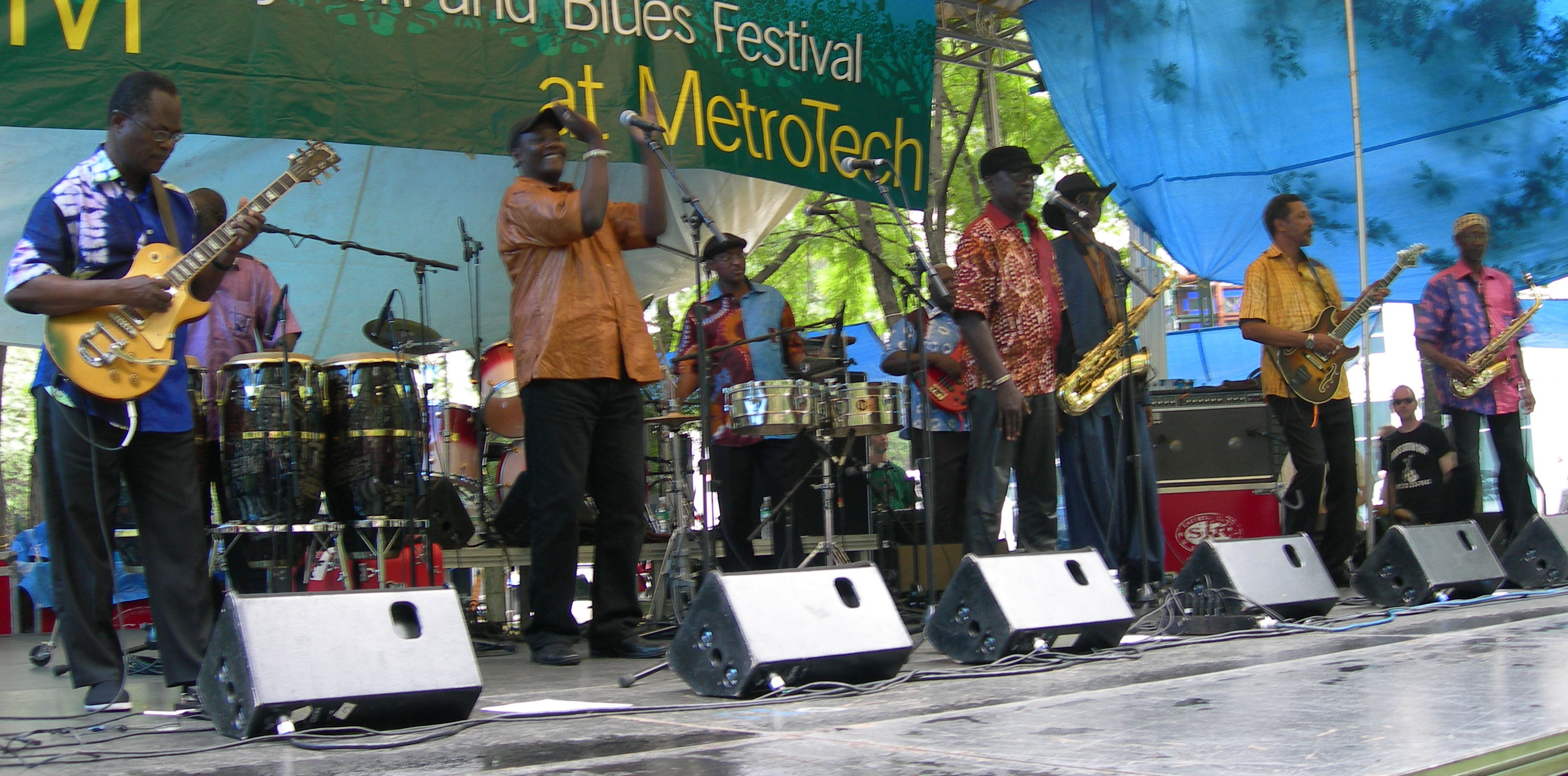
- Orchestra Baobab performing in Brooklyn, New York, in 2008

Background information
- Also known as: Gouye Guy de Dakar
- Origin: Dakar, Senegal
- Genres: Son cubano, Wolof music, Mande music, Afro-Cuban jazz
- Years active: 1970–1987; 2001–present
- Labels: Buur Records, Musicafrique, Ledoux, World Circuit
- Members: Thierno Koité; Wilfrid Zinsou; Mountaga Koité; Oumar Sow; Rene Sowatche; Yakhya Fall; Abdouleye Cissoko; Moussa Cissoko; Ndeye Korka Dieng; Zaccharia Koité; Malick Sy
- Past members: Alpha Dieng; Balla Sidibé†; Issa Cissoko†; Rudy Gomis†; Baro N'Diaye; Charlie N'diaye†; Laye M'Boup†; Latfi Benjeloum†; Barthélémy Attisso†; Sidath Ly; Medoune Diallo†; Ndiouga Dieng†; Thione Seck†; Peter Udo; Papa Ba; Mapenda Seck; Moussa Kane
- Website: orchestrabaobab.com

Orchestra Baobab is a Senegalese band established in 1970 as the house band of the Baobab Club in Dakar. Many of the band's original members had previously played with Star Band de Dakar in the 1960s. Directed by timbalero and vocalist Balla Sidibé, the group featured saxophonists Issa Cissoko and Thierno Koité, two singers, two guitarists and a rhythm section with drums, congas and bass guitar. Since their formation, the band has predominantly played a mix of son cubano, Wolof music, and to a lesser extent Mande musical traditions. Following the deaths of Cissoko in 2019 and Sidibé in 2020, Thierno Koité has become the leader of the band.

Orchestra Baobab became one of the dominant African bands of the 1970s, recording 20 albums before their breakup in 1987, which occurred as a result of the increase in popularity of mbalax, a more contemporary genre of Senegalese music. In the years following their disbandment, World Circuit released several of their albums on CD, making the band very popular among world music fans in the UK and the rest of Europe. This prompted their reformation in 2001, which was followed by the recording of a new album, Specialist in All Styles. The group continues to tour extensively and has released three more studio albums, Made in Dakar (2007), Tribute to Ndiouga Dieng (2017) and Made in Senegal (2026).

== History ==
=== Early years: 1970–1972 ===
Many of the original members were veterans of the famous Star Band, whose alumni later included the Étoile de Dakar, El Hadji Faye and Youssou N’Dour. Star Band were the resident band of the upscale Dakar Miami Club. When the Baobab Club opened in Dakar in 1970, six musicians, led by saxophonist Baro N'Diaye, were lured from Star Band and the Orchestra Baobab was born. The club, in turn, is named for the baobab tree (Adansonia).

The original frontmen of the band were the Casamance singers Balla Sidibé and Rudy Gomis, who came from the melting pot of Casamance musical styles, and most famously Laye M'Boup, who provided vocals in the Wolof griot style. His Wolof language lyrics and his soaring, nasal voice defined the sound of Baobab's early hits. Togolese guitarist and arranger Barthélémy Attisso was a law student in Dakar, and a self-taught musician, whose arpeggiated runs became instantly recognizable. With the saxophone of Baro N'Diaye, this was the first core of the band. After touring Cameroon in 1971, N'Diaye was replaced by tenor saxophonist Issa Cissoko, who became leader of the band, and was joined by clarinettist Peter Udo. Both Cissoko and drummer Mountaga Koité were from Maninka griot families, from Mali and eastern Senegal, respectively. The group's lineup was rounded out by the slow groove Latin styles of Latfi Benjeloum (rhythm guitar), who came from a Moroccan family exiled to Saint-Louis, Senegal, and Charlie N'Diaye (bass) from Casamance.

The group's first recordings were released as Orchestre Saf Mounadem on a split album with Orchestre Laye Thiam, another band of ex-Star Band musicians. Attisso is credited as musical director, and singers Balla Sidibé and Medoune Diallo (who had stayed with the Star Band a bit longer than the others), along with Issa Cissoko are also credited on the cover. Like most of the recordings by Star Band, the album was produced by Ibrahim Kassé, and was later reissued in France under the title Star Band de Dakar Vol. 7.

Their first two albums under the name Orchestra Baobab, were recorded at the Baobab Club between 1970 and 1972, and self-produced by the band. Both bear the title Orchestre du Baobab.

=== Rise to fame: 1973–1978 ===
The band continued to tour throughout Africa, popularising their combination of Afro-Cuban music and Senegalese traditions. Unlike other bands from the country, they combined the Casamance harmonies and drumming from southern Senegal with melodies from Togo and Morocco to the Wolof tradition from northern Senegal. Traditional Wolof singing was provided by Laye M´Boup until his death in June 1975. He was replaced by Ndiouga Dieng, who stayed with the band until his own death in 2016. In 1974, an 18-year old singer joined the band on recommendation of M'Boup himself: Thione Seck, who later achieved great success as a solo artist when he left the band in 1979. His younger brother Mapenda Seck also provided vocals occasionally after the death of M'Boup. Most of the Spanish-language hits by the band were sung by Medoune Diallo, whose mother tongue was Fula.

With the independent Dakar-based label Buur Records, run by the owners of the Baobab Club, the group released five albums between 1975 and 1976: Bawobab 75, Guy Gu Rey Gi, Senegaal Sunugaal, Visage du Senegaal and Adduna jarul naawo.

Looking for success beyond the African continent, Orchestra Baobab went to Paris in 1978 to record new material with producer Abou Sylla. The resulting two LPs, On verra ça and Africa 78, although receiving great critical acclaim retrospectively, did not prove successful. The group lost money on the trip and returned to Senegal. They recorded two albums, released by Musicafrique: Ndeleng Ndeleng and Une nuit au Jandeer.

=== Club closure and new recordings: 1979–1982 ===
By the end of the 1970s, the band concluded its residency at the Baobab Club, which closed its doors in 1979. At this point, they were Senegal's biggest band, "commanding fees of about $4,500 for a single show." In the early 1980s, with the advent of the cassette, the group began releasing albums in this format. Their 1981 albums Mouhamadou Bamba and Sibou odia extended their success into the new decade, helped by their hit "Autorail", composed by Medoune Diallo.

In 1982, they recorded enough material for several cassettes (Vol. 1: Senegambie, Vol. 2: Ngalam), as well as an LP, Ken dow werente. Among the songs recorded for these sessions was "Utru horas", which was included in the various artists compilation Panorama du Senegal.

=== Decline and disbandment: 1983–1987 ===
As the 1980s progressed, competition from mbalax, a new funk-inspired genre spearheaded by Youssou N'Dour's Super Étoile de Dakar, overwhelmed Orchestra Baobab. Although bandleader Balla Sidibé tried to make some changes in the mid-1980s by including two female singers in their lineup and getting Rudy Gomis back as lead singer, their popularity had been significantly reduced. Their 1986 cassette releases did not have the impact of previous albums and in 1987 the band effectively broke up. Many of the members formed or joined other groups, and Barthélémy Attisso returned to Togo to practice law and stopped playing his instrument.

=== European reissues: 1989–1999 ===
By the end of the 1980s, world music had become one of the newest trends in the European and American music industry, with albums such as Paul Simon's Graceland selling millions of copies. This prompted specialized music labels to seek African recordings and reissue them on CD. One of such labels, World Circuit, run from London by Nick Gold, released Orchestra Baobab's 1982 sessions in 1989 under the title Pirate's Choice, a reference to the many bootleg releases of such songs.

In 1992, World Circuit reissued the 1978 Paris sessions on one CD, and in 1993 Stern's Music, another London-based world music label, released Bamba, a compilation of the band's 1981 albums. In 1998, the band's debut album, along with several bonus tracks recorded between 1970 and 1971, were released in the Netherlands as N'Wolof. In 1999, the German label Popular African Music released Roots and Fruit, a compilation of the band's 1970s recordings.

=== Reunion: 2001–present ===
==== Specialist in All Styles ====
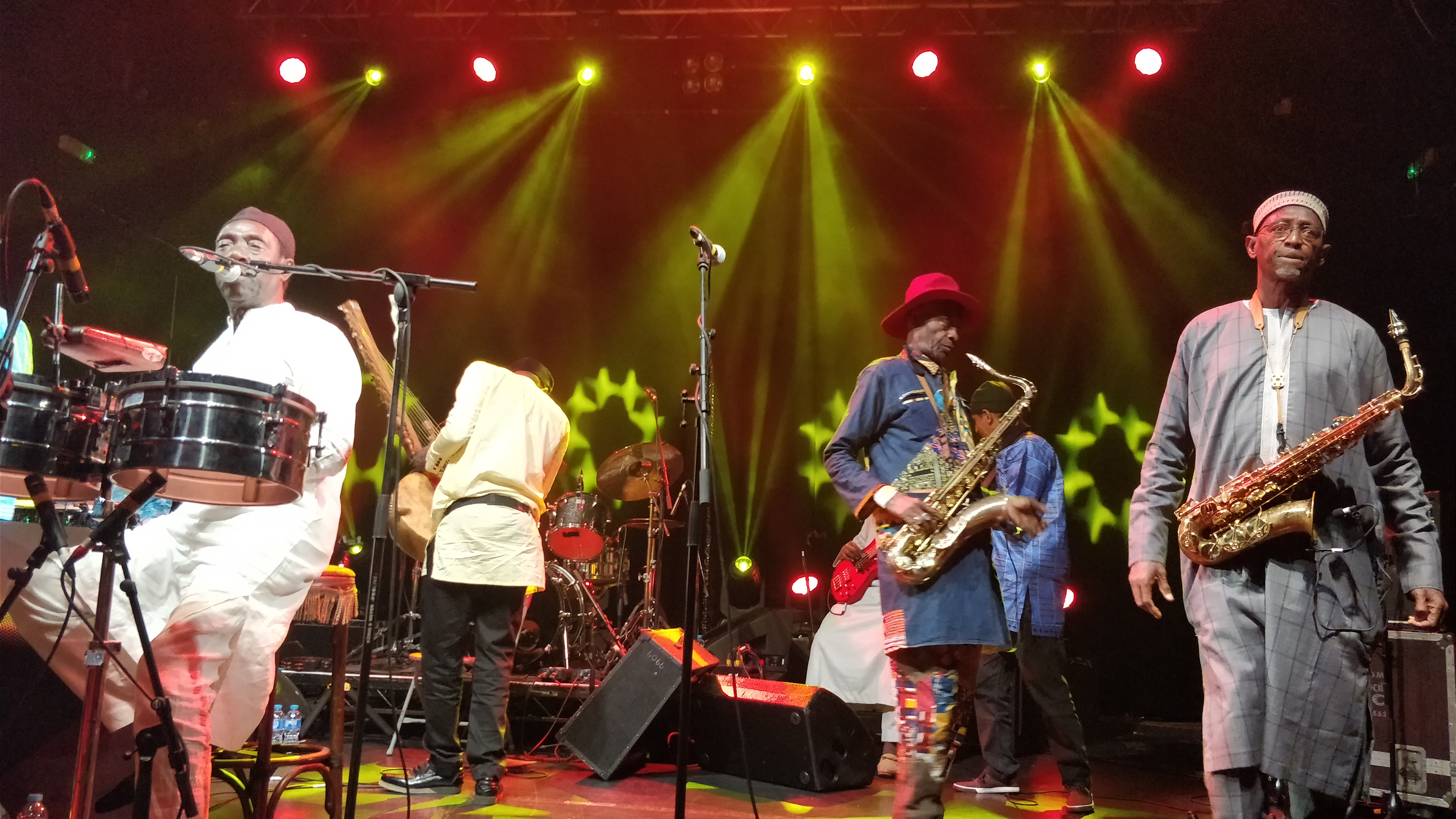
Orchestra Baobab live at KOKO, London, in October 2017. Left to right: Balla Sidibé (timbales), Abdoulaye Cissoko (kora), Issa Cissoko (tenor saxophone), Thierno Koité (alto saxophone).

Following the widespread critical acclaim received by the band's European releases, World Circuit persuaded the group to reform in 2001. Most of the original line up reunited to play London's Barbican Centre in May 2001. Afterwards, the band re-recorded many of their classic songs in state-of-the-art studios in London (Livingston Studios), Paris (Studio Davout) and Dakar (Studio Xippi). The resulting album, Specialist in All Styles, was released in 2002. It was produced by Youssou N'Dour and featured a guest appearance by Cuban singer Ibrahim Ferrer alongside N'Dour himself. Ferrer had been retired for decades before the 1996 recording of the Buena Vista Social Club album, organised and produced by Nick Gold. The release of the album was accompanied by a world tour, which included performances on TV such as their appearance on Later... with Jools Holland in October 2002.

Orchestra Baobab gained attention from American media in 2003 when musicians Trey Anastasio and Dave Matthews filmed a documentary named Trey and Dave go to Africa which aired on VH1. The two visited Senegal and performed with Orchestra Baobab during the program. They performed again together on the Late Show with David Letterman in May 2004. In July 2005, Orchestra Baobab performed at Live 8 in Johannesburg, a series of concerts to raise awareness and funds to end poverty.

==== Made in Dakar ====
In October 2007, Orchestra Baobab released the album Made in Dakar on World Circuit to critical acclaim. The album contains new recordings of some of their classic songs such as "Pape Ndiaye" and "Nijaay". In May 2009, Syllart released La Belle Époque, a compilation of the band's 1970s recordings, including several previously unreleased songs. The package included a biography by Radio France Internationale journalist Pierre René-Worms, focusing on the early years before the group split. CD 1 comprises recordings made at Club Baobab, Dakar, in 1971, 1973 and 1976, while CD 2 includes their 1978 Paris sessions. A second volume was released in 2011, featuring recordings made between 1973 and 1976.

==== Tribute to Ndiouga Dieng ====
Ten years on from their previous release, after the retirement of Attisso, the departure of Benjeloun and the death of Ndiouga Dieng in November 2016, Orchestra Baobab continue to tour and record new material. Dieng was replaced by his son, Alpha Dieng. Under Balla Sidibé's leadership, they released Tribute to Ndiouga Dieng on 31 March 2017. The album features Beninese guitarist René Sowatche as Attisso's replacement and, for the first time, the band incorporates a kora player, Abdoulaye Cissoko. There are also appearances of ex-member Thione Seck and popular singer Cheikh Lô. The album release was accompanied by a world tour with concerts in played in the UK, France and Norway.

As the band approached its 50th anniversary, its key members died: Issa Cissoko died in March 2019 at the age of 72, while Balla Sidibé died in July 2020, aged 78. Despite the loss of both of its leaders, Orchestra Baobab decided to continue, with longtime saxophonist Thierno Koité as its new director. Former lead singer Thione Seck (aged 66) and former guitarist Barthélémy Attisso (aged 76) both died in 2021. Rudy Gomis suffered from severe meningitis in October 2016 and went into a coma. He fully recovered in 2020, but died at the age of 75 in April 2022.

==== Made in Senegal ====
In October 2026, Orchestra Baobab released Made in Senegal, on the Strut Records label. Entirely recorded in Dakar, this new studio album is the first to feature singer Korka Dieng.

== Awards ==
After being separated for 15 years Orchestra Baobab reunited in 2001. The reunited group went on to win the award for best African artists and the critics' choice award at the 2003 BBC Radio 3 World Music Awards. The group won both awards for Specialist in All Styles, their first album since their split in 1987. In winning the Best African Artists award Orchestra Baobab beat the African musicians Kassé Mady Diabaté and Tony Allen.

== Discography ==
This list includes all the studio albums by Orchestra Baobab, with label information to identify the original issues. As usual in Africa, most cassettes were released with no label or catalog number.

- Orchestre Laye Thiam / Orchestre Saf Mounadem (1970, Ibrahim Kassé 3026)
- Orchestre du Baobab (1971, Baobab BAO 1)
- Orchestre du Baobab (1972, Baobab BAO 2)
- Orchestre Baobab '75' (1975, Buur BRLP 001)
- Guy Gu Rey Gi (1975, Buur BRLP 002)
- Senegaal sunugaal (1975, Buur BRLP 003)
- Visage du Senegal (1975, Buur BRLP 004)
- Aduna jarul naawoo (1976, Buur BRLP 005)
- N'Deleng N'Deleng (1977, Musicafrique MSCLP 001)
- Une nuit au Jandeer (1978, Musicafrique MSCLP 002)
- Baobab à Paris Vol. 1: On verra ça (1978, Ledoux ASL 7001)
- Baobab à Paris Vol. 2: Africa 78 (1978, Ledoux ASL 7002)
- Mouhamadou Bamba (1981, Jambaar JM 5000)
- Sibou odia (1981, Jambaar JM 5004)
- Vol. 1: Senegambie (1982)
- Vol. 2: Ngalam (1982)
- Ken Dou Werente (1982, MCA 307)
- Vol. 3: Coumba Ndiaye (1986)
- Mame Diarra Bousso (1986)
- Yamdoulene (1986)
- Nouvelle formation (1986, Syllart SYL 83105)
- Specialist in All Styles (2002, World Circuit WCD 064)
- Made in Dakar (2007, World Circuit WCD 078)
- Tribute to Ndiouga Dieng (2017, World Circuit WCD 092)
- Made in Senegal (2026, Strut Records)

=== Compilations ===
- Gouygui dou daanou (1979, Discafrique DARL 001) – reissue of 1978 Paris sessions
- Hommage à Laye M'Boup (1982, Bellot 3806)
- Pirates Choice (1989, World Circuit WCD 014) – reissue of 1982 sessions
- On verra ça: The 1978 Paris Sessions (1992, World Circuit WCD 027) – reissue of 1978 Paris sessions
- Bamba (1993, Stern's STCD 3003) – reissue of 1980–81 sessions
- N'Wolof (1998, Dakar Sound 014) – reissue of 1970–71 sessions
- Roots and Fruit (1999, Popular African Music 304)
- Pirates Choice (2001, World Circuit WCD 063) – double CD edition
- A Night at Club Baobab (2006, Oriki ORK 001)
- Classics Titles (2006, Cantos)
- La Belle Époque (2009, Syllart 361)
- La Belle Époque Vol. 2 (2011, Syllart 990)

== See also ==
- Africando
