= Marie Madeleine Diallo =

Senegalese actress

- Born: Marie Madeleine Valfroy; 9 April 1948 (age 78); Saint-Louis, Senegal
- Occupation: actress

Marie Madeleine Diallo (née Valfroy; born 9 April 1948) is a Senegalese actress. She is also a former radio presenter at RTS.

== Career ==
=== Theatre ===
Marie Madeleine Diallo began to attract attention during the end-of-year shows organized at the Saint-Joseph de Cluny in Saint-Louis. At 16, she joined the theatre section of the cultural and sports association La Saint-louisienne.

In 1975, she became a presenter on RTS Saint-Louis radio and then in 1983 joined the theatre troupe of the same media outlet. She performed in several radio plays. In 1990, her performance in the television film Bara Yegoo, which brought her national fame in Senegal.

=== Filmography ===
- 2001: Salut la vie TV movie by Daniel Janneau.
- 2005: Le Jardin de papa film by Zéka Laplaine.
- 2005: Les Cités coloniales en Afrique - Le Sénégal - Saint-Louis série documentary series by Georges Courrèges.
- 2010: Blissi N'Diaye ou la visite de la dame short film by Nicolas Sawalo Cissé selected in competition at 2011 FESPACO and the 2011 Anjou Festival.

=== Television ===
- Domou Baye produced by RTS
- Borom N'Darr
- Pa Kouy by director Moussa Diop
- Bara Yeego

== Personal life ==
She is the widow of the painter Jacob Yakouba, who died in 2014.

She is the sister of Senegalese musicians Edouard Valfroy and Benjamin Valfroy.

== Recognition ==
In 2014, Marie Madeleine Diallo was elevated to the rank of officer of the National Order of Merit by the President of Senegal Macky Sall.

In 1992, the singer Youssou N'Dour dedicated a song to her entitled Marie - Madeleine, la Saint-Louisienne in the album Eyes Open.
