= Music of Senegal =

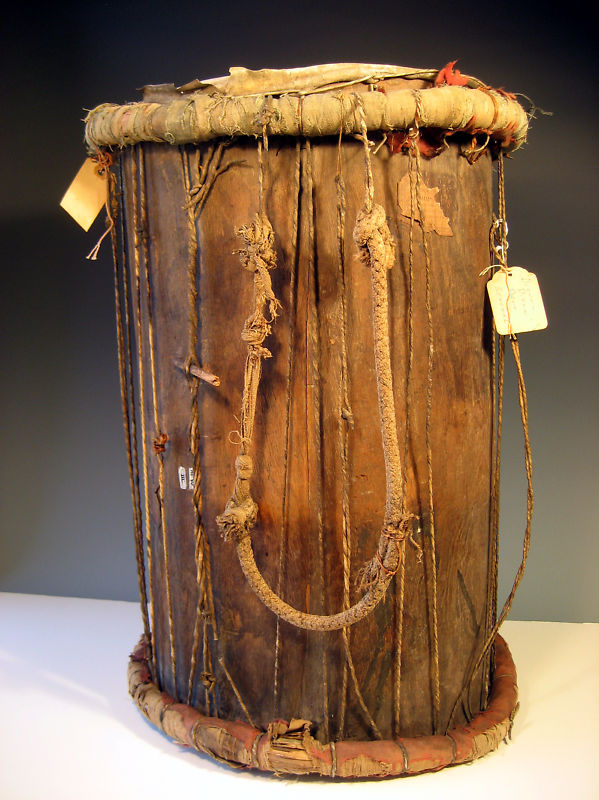
A 19th century junjung of Sine.

Senegal's music is best known abroad due to the popularity of mbalax, a development of conservative music from different ethnic groups and sabar drumming popularized internationally by Youssou N'Dour.

== Senegalese Musical Instruments ==
=== List ===
- Bomvola
- Ilulam
- Tuga Carat
- ooga
- Gahtim
- Kghvawasi
- Ghata
- Sirom
- Xylophone (Around Senegal Brazil China Sudan Ecuador)
- Zazoli
- bolbia
- Tam Tam

== National music ==
During the colonial ages Senegal was colonized by France and many, though not all, Senegalese identified as French instead of any African ethnicity. Post-independence, the philosophy of negritude arose, which espoused the idea that the griot traditions of Senegal were as valid, classical and meaningful as French classical music. The first President of Senegal, Léopold Sédar Senghor (also a poet) was one of the primary exponents of this. The national anthem of Senegal, "Pincez tous vos koras, frappez les balafons" ("Pluck all your koras, strike the balafons"), was adopted in 1960. Its lyrics, by president Senghor, refer to Senegalese music tradition, while its music was composed by Herbert Pepper (fr).

== Traditional music ==
Ethnically the population of Senegal is 41.3% Wolof, 17.8% Fula, 14.7% Serer, 4.9% Mandinka, 3.7% Jola and 2.1% Soninka, with 1% European and Lebanese and 6.4% classed as "other" Senegalese music has been influenced by its different ethnic groups and griots. It tends to be fast and lively whereas the lyrics are in classical Wolof with rhythms used in sabar music of the Serer people of the Kingdom of Sine and spread to the Kingdom of Saloum whence Wolof migrants brought it to the Wolof kingdoms. The Nder (lead drum), Sabar (rhythm drum), and Tama (talking drum) percussion section traces some of its technique to the ritual music of Njuup. The Serer people infuse their everyday language with complex overlapping cadences and their ritual with intense collaborative layerings of voice and rhythm."

The Njuup was also the progenitor of Tassu, used when chanting ancient religious verses. The griots of Senegambia still use it at marriages, naming ceremonies or when singing the praises of patrons. Most Senegalese and Gambian artists use it in their songs. Each motif has a purpose and is used for different occasions. Individual motifs may represent the history and genealogy of a particular family and are used during weddings, naming ceremonies, funerals etc.

== Popular music after independence ==
=== 1950s and 1960s ===
Prior to independence, Senegalese popular music consisted of nightclub dance bands (orchestres) that played European music, namely American and French songs. As independence approached and the country sought to move away from its colonial past, the popular music of Senegal began to be influenced by the Cuban music that was becoming popular throughout Africa. Ibra Kasse's Star Band was the most famous orchestra of the 1960s and 1970s and was a leader in the modernization of Senegalese music. Super Star de Dakar, led by Nigerian saxophonist, Dexter Johnson, spun off from the Star Band and was the other leading band in Dakar in the 1960s. Both played a style that was heavily influenced by Cuban music but had elements of traditional African music.

The south of Senegal, called Casamance, has a strong Mandinka minority, and began producing masters of the kora in the late 1950s. The band Touré Kunda was the most popular group to arise from this scene, and they soon began playing large concerts across the world.

=== 1970s and 1980s ===
The 1970s saw the increased influence of traditional Senegalese music. Traditional drums like the saber and the tama were introduced by leading orchestras and the music progressed over the decade from predominately Latin-influenced to the Senegalese style known as Mbalax. The Star Band and three of its off-shoots from the 1970s were important in the evolution of the music. In 1970, Orchestra Baobab broke away from the Star Band followed by No. One de Dakar in 1976. All three bands were notable for their integration of traditional musical styles into the common Latin dance styles of the Senegalese nightclub bands of the time. In the town of Thiès, Royal Band de Thiès and Dieuf Dieul de Thiès are also considered influential in the evolution of Senegalese popular music.

In 1977, the entire rhythm section and many other performers in the Star Band left to form Étoile de Dakar, who are often considered the first band to play Mbalax. They quickly eclipsed their compatriots, launching the careers of El Hadji Faye and Youssou N'Dour. Faye and N'Dour were Senegal's first pop stars, but the stress of fame soon drove the band apart. Faye and guitarist Badou N'diaye formed Étoile 2000, releasing a hit with "Boubou N'Gary", but soon disappearing after three similar-sounding albums.

N'Dour and other members of Étoile de Dakar became known as Super Étoile de Dakar and released four albums within a few months. Super Étoile de Dakar evolved into N'Dour's backing band. He was soon by far the most popular performer in the country, and perhaps in all of West Africa. He introduced more traditional elements to his Senegalized Cuban music, including traditional rapping (tassou), njuup, bakou music (a kind of trilling that accompanies Serer wrestling) and instruments like the sabar.

While N'Dour and others Africanized Cuban music, another influential band, Xalam, was doing the same with American funk and jazz. They formed in 1970, led then by drummer Prosper Niang, but their controversial lyrics and unfamiliar jazz sound led to a lack of popularity, and the group moved to Paris in 1973. There, they added Jean-Philippe Rykiel on keyboards. Xalam toured with groups such as Rolling Stones and Crosby, Stills, Nash & Young, finally achieving success in Senegal with 1988's Xarit.

In the latter part of the 1970s, the band Super Diamono formed, fusing mbalax rhythms and militant populism with jazz and reggae influences. Their 1982 Jigenu Ndakaru was especially popular. By the middle of the 1980s, Super Diamono was one of the top bands in Senegal, in close and fierce competition with Super Étoile de Dakar. The band's popularity declined, however, slowed somewhat by Omar Pene's reformation in 1991.

=== 1990s to the present ===
Into the 1990s, Thione Seck, a griot descended from those of Lat Dior, the king of Kayor, arose to solo stardom from Orchestra Baobab, eventually forming his own band called Raam Daan (crawl slowly towards your goal). He used electric instruments on many popular releases, especially Diongoma and Demb. The same period saw the rise of Ismael Lô, a member of Super Diamono, who had major hits, including "Attaya", "Ceddo" and "Jele bi".

Baaba Maal is another popular Senegalese singer. He is from Podor and won a scholarship to study music in Paris. After returning, he studied traditional music with his blind guitarist and family griot, Mansour Seck, and began performing with the band Daande Lenol. His Djam Leelii, recorded in 1984, became a critical sensation in the United Kingdom after it was released there in 1989. Maal's fusions continued into the next decade, with his Firin' in Fouta (1994) album, which used ragga, salsa and Breton harp music to create a popular sound that launched the careers of Positive Black Soul, a group of rappers, and also led to the formation of the Afro-Celt Sound System. His fusion tendencies continued on 1998's Nomad Soul, which featured Brian Eno as one of seven producers.

Though female performers were achieving popular breakthroughs elsewhere in West Africa, Senegalese women had few opportunities before the 1990s. The first international release by a woman was "Cheikh Anta Mbacke" (1989) by Kiné Lam. The song's success led to a string of female performers, including Fatou Guewel, Madiodio Gning, Daro Mbaye and Khar Mbaye Madiaga. Lam, however, remained perhaps the most influential female musician of the 1990s, creating a modernized version of sabar ak xalam ensembles by adding bass guitar and synthesizer with 1993's Sunu Thiossane. The release of Fatou Guewel's CD entitled 'Fatou' in 1998 was significantly influential for Mbalax; this is also the case with her band 'Groupe Sope Noreyni'.

The new century has seen the rise of Viviane Ndour, who got her first break as a backing vocalist to Youssou Ndour with Super Etoile. She is well known in Senegal and the diaspora, collaborating with French rap star Mokobe and Zouk artist Philip Montiero and incorporating RnB, Hip-Hop and other elements into her own style of Mbalax.

Acoustic folk music has also left its mark on Senegal's music culture. Artists that have contributed to this genre include TAMA from Rufisque, Pape Armand Boye, les Freres Guisse, Pape et Cheikh, and Cheikh Lo.

The biggest trend in 1990s Senegal, however, was hip hop. Traditional culture includes rapping traditions, such as the formal tassou, performed by women of the Laobe woodworking class the morning after marriages. Modern Senegalese hip hop is mostly in Wolof, alongside some English and French. Positive Black Soul is the best-known group in the country, Daara j, Gokh-Bi System and Wageble too. Senegalese-French rapper MC Solaar is a very well known musician. Senegalese born Akon has risen to world fame.

In 2008 English musician Ramon Goose travelled to Dakar and collaborated with Senegalese griot Diabel Cissokho to record the album Mansana Blues which explores African blues & traditional West African styles, this led on to the formation of The West African Blues Project with Touré Kunda singer Modou Toure.

== Sources ==
- Hudson, Mark, Jenny Cathcart and Lucy Duran. "Senegambian Stars Are Here to Stay". 2000. In Broughton, Simon and Ellingham, Mark with McConnachie, James and Duane, Orla (Ed.), World Music, Vol. 1: Africa, Europe and the Middle East, pp 617–633. Rough Guides Ltd, Penguin Books. ISBN 1-85828-636-0
