= Dieng =

Dieng may refer to:

== Places ==
- Dieng Plateau, a marshy plateau situated near Wonosobo, Indonesia
- Dieng Volcanic Complex, a complex of volcanoes in the Central Java, Indonesia

== People ==
- Aïyb Dieng, Senegalese drummer
- Adama Dieng (born 1950), UN Secretary-General's Special Adviser for the Prevention of Genocide
- Adji Bousso Dieng, Senegalese computer scientist and statistician
- Gorgui Dieng (born 1990), Senegalese basketball player
- Mame Younousse Dieng (1939–2016), Senegalese writer
- Ndiaga Dieng (born 1999), Italian Paralympic athlete
- Ndiouga Dieng, Senegalese singer, Orchestra Baobab
- Ousmane Dieng (born 2003), French basketball player
- Ousmane Tanor Dieng (born 1948), first secretary of the Socialist Party of Senegal
- Oumar Dieng (born 1972), French footballer
- Rose Dieng-Kuntz (1956–2008), Senegalese French computer scientist
- Seny Dieng (born 1994), Senegalese footballer
