= Specialist in All Styles =

Studio album by Orchestra Baobab
- Released: 2002
- Studio: Livingston
- Labels: World Circuit; Nonesuch
- Producers: Nick Gold, Youssou N'Dour

Orchestra Baobab chronology
Pirates Choice (2001)	Specialist in All Styles (2002)	A Night at Club Baobab (2006)

Specialist in All Styles is an album by the Senegalese band Orchestra Baobab, released in 2002. After the success of the Pirates Choice reissue, the band decided to record a reunion album. It was Orchestra Baobab's first album in 15 years. The album title was taken from a sign hanging outside a barbershop.

The band supported the album with a world tour. The album was nominated for a Grammy Award for "Best Contemporary World Music Album".

== Production ==
Recorded over 10 days in London, Specialist in All Styles was produced by Nick Gold and Youssou N'Dour; ironically, N'Dour's rise in popularity in the 1980s led in part to Orchestra Baobab's disbandment. Among the returning members were singers Balla Sidibe and Rudy Gomis, guitarist Barthelemy Atisso, and saxophonist Issa Cissoko. Attiso had barely played guitar in 15 years, and had to relearn after Gold and the band's singers sent one to him. A new singer, Assane Mboup, contributed to the album. Like previous Baobab albums, Specialist was influenced by Cuban music; it also made use of mbalax and reggae sounds.

Ibrahim Ferrer and N'Dour sang on "Hommage à Tonton Ferrer". Many songs are remakes of the band's earlier hits, although "Bul Ma Miin" was written for the album. "Ndongoy Daara", about malfeasance in Qur'anic educational institutions, was written by the band's first singer, Laye Mboup. The vocals are in Wolof, Mandinka, Spanish, and French.

== Critical reception ==
Professional ratings
Review scores
Source	Rating
AllMusic	4/5 stars
Robert Christgau	A
Detroit Free Press	3/4 stars
The Encyclopedia of Popular Music	4/5 stars
New Internationalist	4/5 stars
Philadelphia Daily News	B+
The Province	3.5/5 stars
Rolling Stone	4/5 stars

Robert Christgau called the album "the ideal introduction to Baobab's relaxed mastery of American instruments, Cuban rhythms, and Senegalese form-and-content." The Guardian deemed it "one of the great comeback albums," writing that "many of the songs offer a relaxed, rolling blend of Cuban salsa, African rhythms and boisterous pop melodies, dressed up with uplifting harmony singing and strong saxophone work." The Toronto Star labeled it "a rich and groovy brew of African salsa, with lyrics that track mostly familiar social concerns." Rolling Stone wrote that "this is groove music at once relaxed and unyielding, insistent enough for the dance floor, trance-y enough to lull an infant."

Financial Times stated that "Attiso is on fine, fluid form, throwing out rippling, jazzy solos against Issa Cissokho's saxophone." Newsweek determined that "though the music retains its unique fusion of Latin and African sounds, the new album is blessed with the added benefit of state-of-the-art production quality and professional sound engineering." The New York Times concluded that "the great surprise on Specialist is Mr. Attiso's haunted, expressive performance." The San Diego Union-Tribune opined: "More nuanced and sophisticated than its predecessor, Specialist features nine intoxicating songs that showcase the group's ebullient call-and-response vocals, swaying rhythms and pinpoint instrumental work." The Chicago Tribune listed Specialist in All Styles as the 16th best album of 2002; the Los Angeles Daily News considered it the 4th best.

AllMusic wrote that "Attisso is all over this record, offering beautiful, inventive solos and playing whose fluidity, especially on 'Gnawe' and 'Dee Moo Wor', is wonderfully atmospheric."

== Track listing ==
No.	Title	Length
1.	"Bul Ma Miin"	6:02
2.	"Sutukun"	5:30
3.	"Dée Moo Wóor"	4:16
4.	"Jiin Ma Jiin Ma"	6:03
5.	"Ndongoy Daara"	5:19
6.	"On Verra Ça"	4:56
7.	"Hommage à Tonton Ferrer"	5:52
8.	"El Son te Llama"	5:25
9.	"Gnawoe"	6:21
