= Ndiouga Dieng =

- Born: 6 June 1947
- Died: 10 November 2016 (aged 69)
- Genres: Son, Wolof
- Instrument(s): Vocals, conga
- Formerly of: Orchestra Baobab

Ndiouga Dieng (6 June 1947 – 10 November 2016) was a Senegalese singer and one of the original vocalists of Orchestra Baobab, who died in 2016 after a prolonged illness. Momo Dieng is his son.
