= Barthélémy Attisso =

Togolese lawyer and guitarist (1945–2021)

- Born: 1945
- Died: August 29, 2021 (aged 75–76)
- Citizenship: Togo
- Occupation: Musician

Barthélémy Attisso (1945 – 29 August 2021) was a Togolese lawyer and self-taught guitarist, most famous for his work with Senegal-based Pan-African band Orchestra Baobab.

== Biography ==
Attisso, born in 1945, moved to Dakar in 1966 to study law at the University of Dakar.

He took up guitar to earn money, playing in the club scene and joining the Star Band. In the early 1970s he joined Orchestra Baobab, and rode the band's success into the 1980s. When the band disbanded in 1987, Attisso returned to Togo to practice law. He did not play the guitar until the 2001 reunion, and went on to record and tour with Orchestra Baobab, although he also maintained his practice in Lomé.

Attisso died from COVID-19 in 2021, during the COVID-19 pandemic in Togo, at the age of 76.
