= Cynthia Brown (singer) =

French singer with Indian origins

Cynthia Brown is a French singer with Indian origins, who participated in the French reality television show Star Academy France (2006) on TF1 including in the semi-final.

== Biography ==
She lost against Cyril Cinelu who won in the final against Dominique Fidanza. She performed duos with Beyoncé Knowles, Julio Iglesias, Patrick Bruel, Johnny Hallyday, etc. In 2008, she began to record an album under Senegalese singer Youssou N'Dour's direction, but Universal Music Group put the plan to one side. N'Dour offered her one of his compositions: "Bébé", a song dedicated to all children in the world. In 2010, she finalised her album Hétéroclite, with the single "Notre Terre".

== Discography ==
- Hétéroclite (2010)
