= Pierre-Yves Borgeaud =

Swiss film director (born 1963)

Pierre-Yves Borgeaud, born in Monthey, Switzerland, is a film director and videographer. He earned a Bachelor’s degree in Arts from the University of Lausanne in 1990, with a thesis exploring the influence of jazz on French writers such as Paul Morand, Boris Vian, Jean-Paul Sartre and Louis-Ferdinand Céline. Borgeaud has worked as an independent journalist, writing on music and visual arts across various media. He also played drums in jazz and funk bands and worked as a music producer.

In 1996-1997, Pierre-Yves Borgeaud studied at New York University earning a certificate from the Department of Film, Video & Broadcasting. Since 97, he has focused on documentaries and music videos, particularly for the ECM label in Germany. He also participated in a video installation workshop at Film/Video Arts in New York. In 1998, Borgeaud became one of the Swiss pioneers of VJing, presenting live performances with musicians like Pierre Audétat, Christy Doran, Nils Petter Molvaer or Don Li (composer/musician).

As a director, producer, and interdisciplinary artist, Borgeaud founded Momentum Production in 1999. In 2000, he received the “Young Artist” award in video from the Swiss Arts Council. His first feature-length film, iXieme: Diary of a Prisoner (2003), won the Golden Leopard for Best Video at the Locarno International Film Festival. In 2004, his short film Interface was nominated for Best Swiss Short Film. In 2008, his film Return to Goree, featuring Senegalese superstar Youssou N'Dour, gained international distribution and acclaim. Best Documentary at the 16th Pan African Film Festival in Los Angeles and numerous other selections and awards for this now cult film.

In 2013, Pierre-Yves Borgeaud's long feature documentary, Viramundo: a musical journey with Gilberto Gil (2013) with Brazilian singer, composer and icon Gilberto Gil had its world premiere at the Visions du Réel Film Festival in Nyon and was widely distributed. The film also inaugurates the T.I.D.E. Experiment for pan-European and multi-support releases.

After adapting two live arts performances for television - Le sexe c'est dégoûtant (2021) by [Antoine Jaccoud], and Velvet, by Philippe Saire Dance company (2023), Borgeaud released Nos utopies communautaires - The Art of living together in 2023. This feature-length documentary follows individuals who have experimented communal living and continue to believe in its potential.

Since 2012, Borgeaud has gained recognition for his short portraits of artists and exceptional individuals, particularly for the Fondation vaudoise pour la culture. In 2025, he is set to produce his 100th portrait. Additionally, he is working on a film project focused on addiction and its treatment in pioneering Swiss services.

== Selected filmography ==
- Nos Utopies communautaires - The art of living together (2023)
- Sex is disgusting (2023)
- Viramundo: a musical journey with Gilberto Gil (2013)
- Subjective Cinema (2009)
- Return to Gorée (2007)
- Family Music (2004)
- iXième : diary of a prisoner (2003)
- Interface: cartography 3 (2003)
- Stimmhorn Stimmhorn: In Land (2001)
- Music Hotel (1998)
- Swiss Jam: swiss musicians in New York (1999)
- Miles post mortem (1998)
- Nils Petter Molvaer: Song of Sand (1997)
