= Eyes Open (Youssou N'Dour album) =

Studio album by Youssou N'Dour
- Released: 1992
- Studio: Xippi
- Genre: Mbalax
- Labels: 40 Acres and a Mule Musicworks/Columbia
- Producer: Youssou N'Dour

Youssou N'Dour chronology
| Set (1990) | Eyes Open (1992) | Special Noël (1993) |

Eyes Open is an album by the Senegalese musician Youssou N'Dour, released in 1992 via Spike Lee's 40 Acres and a Mule Musicworks label. A video was shot for "Africa Remembers". N'Dour supported the album with a North American tour. Eyes Open was nominated for a Grammy Award for "Best World Music Album".

== Production ==
Recorded at N'Dour's studio in Dakar, Senegal, the album was produced by the musician. The majority of the songs were sung in Wolof. N'Dour contributed liner notes that described the references in his songs. "Hope" is a paean to N'Dour's grandmother. "Country Boy" is about leaving rural life for an urban existence. Assane Thiam contributed on talking drum. "Marie-Madeleine la Saint-Louisienne" is dedicated to the actress Marie Madeleine Diallo.

== Critical reception ==
Professional ratings
Review scores
| Source | Rating |
|---|---|
| AllMusic | 3/5 stars |
| Calgary Herald | B+ |
| Robert Christgau | B+ |
| The Encyclopedia of Popular Music | 2/5 stars |
| MusicHound World: The Essential Album Guide | 3.5/5 stars |
| The Rolling Stone Album Guide | 4/5 stars |

Newsday deemed the album "an annoying yet informative dispatch, a disappointing example of the new cultural multinationalism hovering on the upmarket fringes of so-called world music (so-called, because the marketing term smacks of a western ethnocentrism that assumes we are not the world)." Stereo Review wrote that "N'Dour continues to pump out a propulsive sound that's dazzling in its rich combination of rhythms and irresistible in its melodic urgency." The Christian Science Monitor noted that "N'Dour continues to temper his artful confabulation of African sensibility and American funk."

The Calgary Herald determined that "his band's lopingly propulsive rhythms will remind newcomers to soukous more of reggae's hypnotic sway than rock's straight-ahead rush." Trouser Press stated that "the percussion is downplayed in favor of swooping fretless bass and rock-influenced guitars." Robert Christgau opined that the "mbalax commitments mitigate any conceptual link to studio-rock."

== Track listing ==
| No. | Title | Length |
|---|---|---|
| 1. | "New Africa" |
| 2. | "Live Television" |
| 3. | "No More" |
| 4. | "Country Boy" |
| 5. | "Hope" |
| 6. | "Africa Remembers" |
| 7. | "Couple's Choice" |
| 8. | "Yo Lé Lé (Fulani Groove)" |
| 9. | "Survie" |
| 10. | "Am Am" |
| 11. | "Marie-Madeleine la Saint-Louisienne" |
| 12. | "Useless Weapons" |
| 13. | "The Same" |
| 14. | "Things Unspoken" |
