= Wolof music =

Musical traditions of the Wolof ethnic group of Senegal

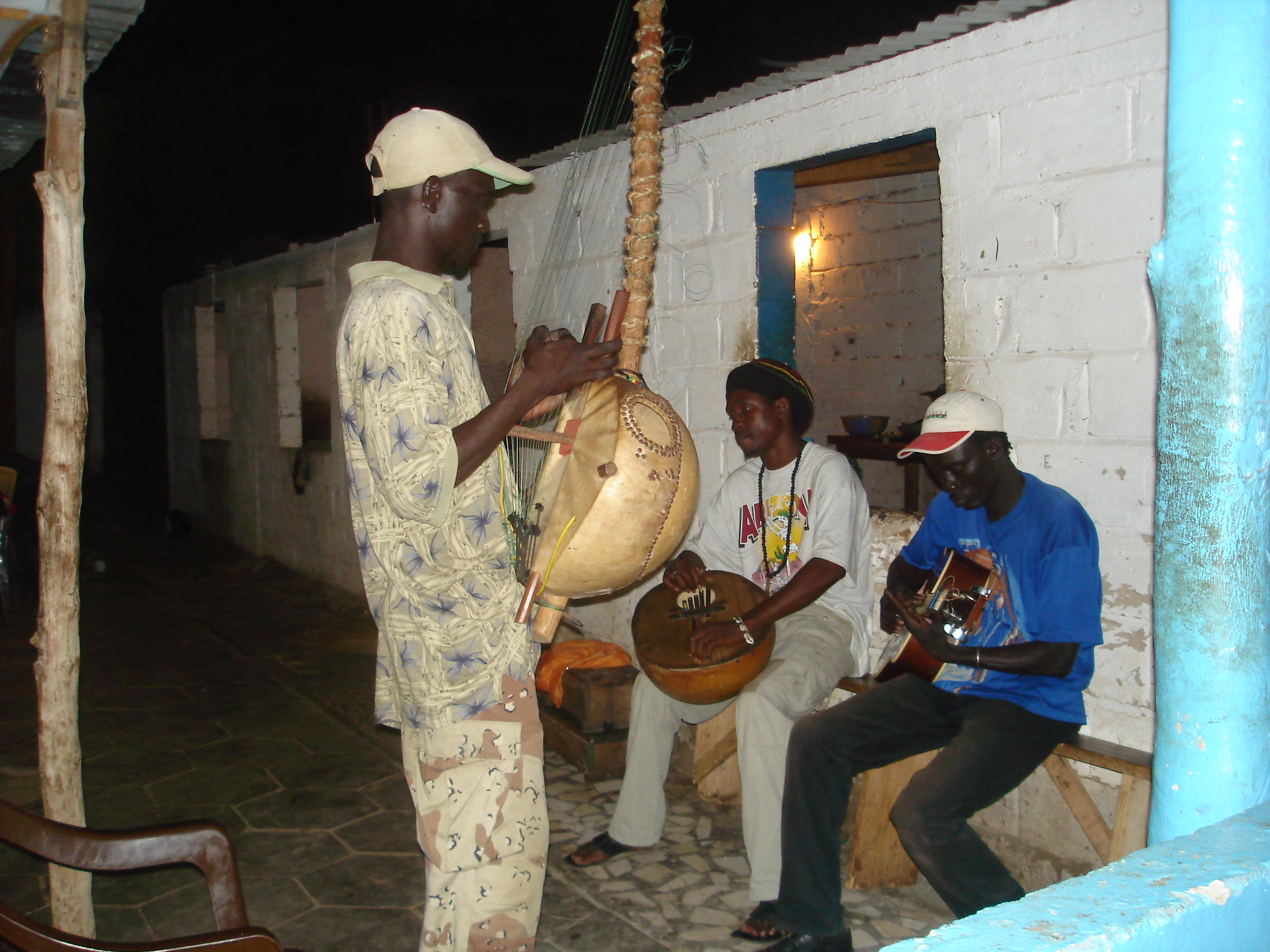
A group of musicians at the village of Mbour, playing a kora, a gongoba drum and a guitar.

The Wolof, the largest ethnic group in Senegal, have a distinctive musical tradition that, along with the influence of neighboring Fulani, Tukulor, Serer, Jola, and Mandinka cultures, has contributed greatly to popular Senegalese music, and to West African music in general. Wolof music takes its roots from the Serer musical tradition, particularly from the Serer pre-colonial Kingdom of Saloum. Virtually all Wolof musical terminology including musical instruments comes from the Serer language.

== Griot tradition ==
Wolof musicians were traditionally drawn from the griots (géwél), or of the blacksmith caste (tëgg), who were masters of drumming. Griots taught history, ethics and religion using their songs and recitations, and were employed by powerful members of the community as praise-singers and historians. Today many modern Wolof musicians still come from Griot families.

After the 19th century conversion of major Wolof kingdoms to Islam, the tagg, or ode song in Wolof, was reused in an Islamic Nasheed tradition—an important integration of pre-Islamic style into the new Muslim paradigm.

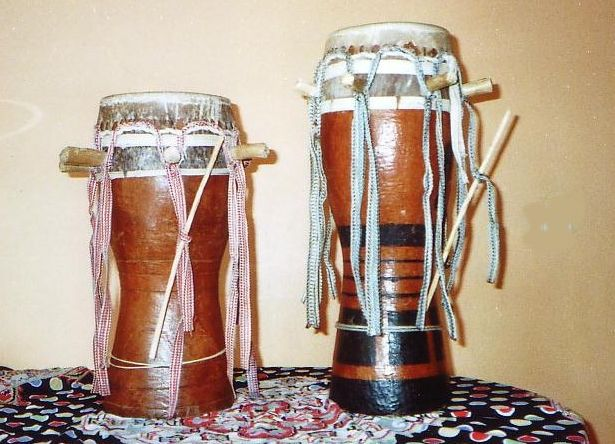
Two Sabar drums from Senegal. On the left a Mbung Mbung Tungoné and on the right a Mbung Mbung Bal.

== Instruments ==
Wolof folk instruments include the xalam or halam, which is a five-stringed lute, very important in Wolof folk music, the sabar drums, an ensemble of seven different drums, each differently tuned, and the hourglass talking drum called a tama. The Qadiriyyah Sufi order use tabla drums.

Modern Wolof musicians have incorporated instruments usually associated with the neighboring Serer, Fula and Mandinka, including the Fula flute, the Mandinka balafon, the Maures tabla drums, the Mandinka kora (a West African harp), the riiti (a Fula single-stringed bowed instrument), the Serer instruments i.e. tama, the sabar, the junjung, and the Serer motifs and genres i.e. mbalax (from Serer-njuup), mbeng mbeng, baka, tassou, etc.

The Serer people are known especially for their rich knowledge of vocal and rhythmic practices that infuse their everyday language with complex overlapping cadences and their ritual with intense collaborative layerings of voice and rhythm... Many Serer communities are known for their longstanding preservation of traditional healing practices, nature-based sorcery and soothsaying, love of inter-community traditional wrestling (Senegalese wrestling) matches, and intense familiarity with the complex rhythms of the African talking drum called Tama and the dance and song that accompany it.

The late Serer-diva Yandé Codou Sène was a practitioner of the Tassou (var : Tasú), a "form of sung and chanted poetry central to both everyday and ritual Serer life that is also used explicitly by the Wolof, Fula, Mandinka, Bambara and other regional ethnic groups."

== Dance Rhythms ==
Wolof music has unique dance rhythms. Farwoudiar (in Serer) is a women's dance with a distinct tama accompaniment in which women celebrate their prospective husbands (based on Serer marital tradition).

== See also ==
Music

- Music of Senegal
- Mbalax
- Senegalese hip hop: especially mbalax rap

Senegalese musicians

- Doudou N'Diaye Rose: Sabar master and Griot.
- Mbaye Dieye Faye: Singer and percussionist.
- Youssou N'Dour: Perhaps the most famous Senegalese singer, from a griot family on his mother's side.
- Alioune Mbaye Nder: Singer, the Prince of Mbalax
- Thione Seck: Famed singer of the 1970s to today.
- Jimi Mbaye: Guitarist and producer

== Sources and external links ==
- Mbye B. Cham, "Islam in Senegalese Literature and Film", Africa: Journal of the International African Institute, Vol. 55, No. 4, Popular Islam, 1985 pp. 447–464.
- Ali Colleen Neff, "Tassou: The Ancient Spoken Word of African Women." [in] Ethnolyrical
