= Laba Sosseh =

- Also known as: Labba Sosseh
- Born: Laba Badara Sosseh; 12 March 1943; Bathurst, British Gambia
- Died: 20 September 2007 (aged 64) Dakar, Senegal
- Genres: Son; salsa
- Occupations: Singer; songwriter
- Years active: 1960–2007
- Labels: Africa Productions; N'Dardisc; SAR Records; Espace Africa; Sacodis; Disques Espérance; Disques M.A.G.

Laba Badara Sosseh; Labba Sosseh or Laba Sosseh (12 March 1943 – 20 September 2007) was a Gambian son and salsa singer and composer. According to Abdoulaye Saine of Miami University, Sosseh is regarded as "the greatest salsa singer of his generation and perhaps of all time in Senegambia Major."

== Early life and family ==
A griot, Sosseh was born in Bathurst, British Gambia (now Banjul, the Gambia) on 12 March 1943. Through his mother Aji Mariama Mbaye, commonly referred to as Aja Jankey Mbaye, he is related to the Senegambian musician Musa Ngum and Gambian historian Alieu Ebrima Cham Joof. Through his father Dembo Corah Sosseh (or Dembo Kura Sosseh), he is related to Alieu Ebrima Cham Joof through the Sosseh—Joof family. His maternal grandfather Tafsir Demba Njange Mbaye (or Tafsir Demba Mbaye/Mbye), was an early 20th century Muslim religious leader in Banjul and imam of the local mosque in Half-Die, Banjul. There is a street named after Tafsir Demba in Banjul. Like his cousin Musa, he was ethnically Serer but occasionally sang in Wolof. His ancestors came from the Serer precolonial Kingdom of Saloum and from Banjul, the Gambia. His mother was born in the Gambia but trace descent patrilineally to Kaymor then part of the Kingdom of Saloum, now part of modern day Senegal. His father was born in Senegal. Sosseh was his mother's only child.

His father Dembo was a driver for the British Overseas Airways Corporation (BOAC). When Sosseh was ten years old, his father got a promotion as a signalman and relocated to Dakar, Senegal with his family. In Senegal, Sosseh continued his education in French until graduating at secondary school level.

Sosseh's children include: Denzy Sosseh (an artist, singer, songwriter, and composer), Demba Said Sosseh, and Koumba Sosseh.

== Career ==
After completing his French education in Senegal, Sosseh returned home to the Gambia "and got involved in the evening musical jamboree at "foyer francais" at the hill and Leman Street Junction in Banjul. The "African band" then emerged and Labba joined the band with musicians like Badou Jobe, Ousainou Senghore, and many others."

Whilst in Darkar due to his father's work at the airport, Sosseh engaged in the Senegalese capital's musical scene, which was at the time strongly tilted towards son, rumba and other Cuban rhythms. Sosseh was an early member of Dakar's influential Star Band, but in 1962 he left the Star Band along with Dexter Johnson who was creating his own band, Super Star de Dakar. Sosseh sang with Dexter Johnson's Super Star de Dakar until the late 1960s when he took some of the members of the band to Abidjan, Côte d'Ivoire, where they performed under the same name while Dexter Johnson kept the original band performing in Dakar. He also performed with Issa Cissokho's Vedette band.

In 1972, Sosseh cast his lot with a splinter group, Superstar de Dakar, that was based in Abidjan, Côte d'Ivoire. The band went through several incarnations, including the Super International Band de Dakar featuring singer Pape Fall, and Liwanza. After recording with Liwanza for local producer Aboudou Lassissi in 1977, Lassissi managed for Sosseh to visit New York City, where he became involved in the fledgling salsa scene, and recorded a series of LPs titled "Salsa Africana", with direction from Cuban sonero Monguito "El Unico".

Sosseh remained connected to the New York salsa scene for thirty years. He recorded repeatedly with Orquesta Aragón in Paris, and his song "Diamoule Mawo" was covered by Joe Arroyo (as "Yamulemau", with Arroyo singing in Wolof language by means of a phonetics sheet).

In 1998, Sosseh was tapped by famed Afro-salsa band Africando for their album Baloba! where he sang two tunes: "Ayo Nene" and his signature tune "Aminata". When Senegal and Cuba normalized relations, Sosseh was part of the "Afro-salseros de Senegal" project, together with Pape Fall, James Gadiaga and Issa Cissokho among others. On their only record, Sosseh sings "El Manisero" and (again) "Aminata".

Sosseh was also featured in several compilations of Afro-Cuban music, including "Putumayo: Congo to Cuba".

== Personal life and death ==
Sosseh, who fathered 27 children, died 20 September 2007 in Dakar "after a long illness". Colleagues Pape Fall and Cheikh Tidiane Tall announced his death on RTS, Senegal's state-owned media corporation. Sosseh was buried at the Muslim cemetery in Yoff, Dakar.

== See also ==
- Music of the Gambia
- Music of Senegal
- Music of Africa
- Music of African heritage in Cuba
- Music of Cuba
