= Issa Cissokho =

Senegalese musician (1946–2019)

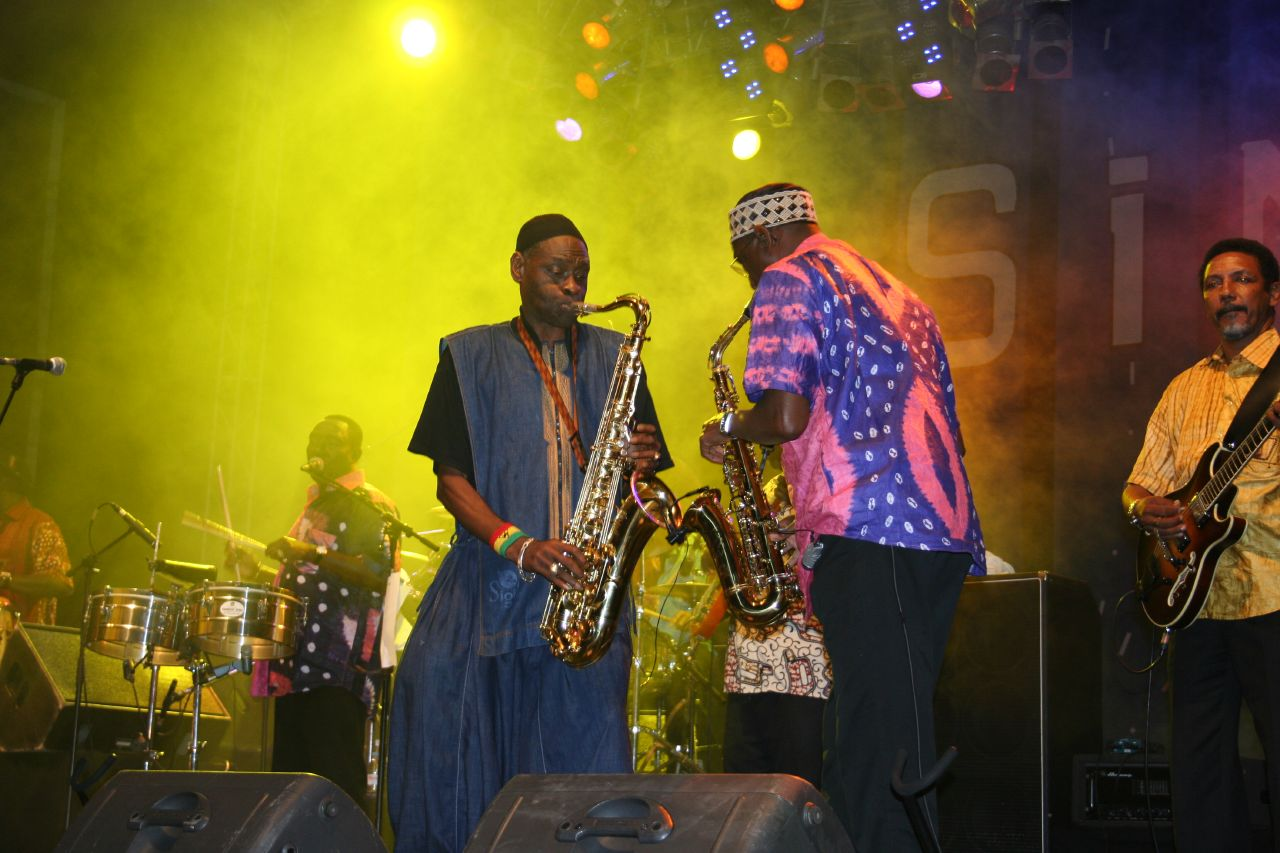
Issa Cissoko (centre-left) plays tenor saxophone against Thierno Koité on alto saxophone (centre-right), during an Orchestra Baobab performance in Sines, Portugal, 2008.

Issa Cissokho (September 1946 – 24 March 2019) (also written as Cissoxo or Cissoko) was a Senegalese musician of Malian griot roots, a composer, and saxophone player for Orchestra Baobab.

Cissokho was recruited to Orchestra Baobab in 1972 while playing in Dakar's Vedette Band, which featured singer Laba Sosseh. With the Orchestra, he played tenor and occasionally alto, with Thierno Koite (replacing original member Baro N’Diaye) playing Soprano and alto. Cissokho was noted for his charisma on stage, and his eclectic musical taste, which led him to write reggae- and ska-flavored tunes for Orchestra Baobab.

Cissokho performed and recorded with other musicians, notably Youssou N'Dour. Cissokho was also a member of the "Afro-Salseros de Senegal", a Senegalese ensemble that recorded in Cuba in 2001, shortly after diplomatic relations with Senegal were normalized, and toured intermittently in the years after. In this project, he was reunited with Sosseh, who had spent many years in the Americas building a reputation as a mainstream salsa singer.

He died on 24 March 2019 at the age of 72.
