= Bébé (song) =

Song performed by Cynthia Brown

"Bébé" is a song written by famous Senegalese international singer Youssou N'Dour and composed by Ibrahima N'Dour. This song appears on Hétéroclite, a record of French singer Cynthia Brown. The music video (a making of the recording session) was shot by French filmmaker Jérémie Carboni.
