= Tomek Kolczynski =

- Born: 1973 (age 52–53); Gdańsk, Poland
- Origin: Poland
- Genres: Theatre music, Electronic music
- Occupations: Record producer, Electronic music composer
- Website: kold.ch

Tomek Kolczynski, a.k.a. Kold (born 1973 in Gdańsk, Poland), is a Swiss musician, composer and sound designer.

== Life ==
Tomek Kolczynski studied audio design under Wolfgang Heiniger from 1997 to 2002. From 2010 to 2012, he continued his studies in free improvisation with Alfred Zimmerlin and Fred Frith at the City of Basel Music Academy.

During his studies, he produced Christian Zehnder's Popple Music album (published by Sound Service Wigra in 2001). In 2005, he published the Igloo album together with Stimmhorn music group, produced in cooperation with Theater Basel. Since 2006 he has composed for various German-speaking theatres, amongst them are: Theater Basel, Munich Kammerspiele, Burgtheater in Vienna, and various others in Zurich and Hanover. Since 2006, he regularly produces music for Edgar Hagen's documentary films. In 2015, he composed music for Feist – a computer game by Florian Faller and Adrian Stutz (Bits & Beasts). Since 2013, he has been part of the BachSpace trio, together with pianist Tamar Halperin and violin player Etienne Abelin. Their debut album was published in September 2017 by the Berlin music label "Neue Meister".

Tomek Kolczynski lives in Basel, where he also teaches at the Music Academy since 2003.

== List of projects (selection) ==
Theater music live

- 2003 Faust II, Stadttheater Basel, Directed by Matthias Günther
- 2006 Wir im Finale, Stadttheater Basel, Directed by Lars-Ole Walburg
- 2010 Parzival, Schauspiel Hannover, Directed by Lars-Ole Walburg
- 2011 Oops, wrong planet, Stadttheater Basel, Directed by Christian Zehnder
- 2013 Peer Gynt, Schauspiel Hannover, Directed by Thomas Dannemann
- 2014 Volksrepublik Volkswagen, Schauspielhaus Hannover, Directed by Stefan Kägi (Rimini Protokoll)

Theater music compositions

- 2007 Die Orestie, Düsseldorfer Schauspielhaus, Directed by Lars-Ole Walburg
- 2007 Schwarze Jungfrauen, Burgtheater Wien, Directed by Lars-Ole Walburg
- 2007 Die Probe, Münchner Kammerspiele, Directed by Lars-Ole Walburg
- 2008 Kaspar Häuser Meer, Münchner Kammerspiele, Directed by Lars-Ole Walburg
- 2010 Alkestis, Schauspiel Hannover, Directed by Tom Kühnel
- 2010 Romeo & Julia, Schauspiel Hannover, Directed by Heike M. Goetze
- 2012 Zwanzig Tausend Seiten (von Lukas Bärfuss), Schauspielhaus Zürich, Directed by Lars-Ole Walburg
- 2013 Amphytrion, Schauspielhaus Zürich, Directed by Karin Henkel
- 2015 Roberto Zucco, Schauspielhaus Zürich, Directed by Karin Henkel
- 2015 Floh im Ohr, Schauspielhaus Hannover, Directed by Thomas Dannemann
- 2016 Die Reichsgründer oder das Schmürz, Schauspielhaus Hannover, Directed by Tom Kühnel
- 2017 Medea, Schauspielhaus Hannover, Directed by Tom Kühnel
- 2018 Weltzustand Davos, Schauspielhaus Zürich, Directed by Helgard Haug and Stefan Kägi (Rimini Protokoll)

Soundtracks

- 2006 Someone beside you, Documentary by Edgar Hagen
- 2010 Charly‘s Comeback, TV-Film by Sören Senn
- 2013 Reise zum sichersten Ort der Welt, Documentary by Edgar Hagen
- 2015 Feist, Computergame by Florian Faller & Adrian Stutz

Various Productions

- 2000 Popple Music, CD, Zehnder with kold (Sound Service Wigra, 2001)
- 2003 Talk with my Turntables, with Christian Zehnder
- 2004 Igloo, CD, Stimmhorn & kold electronics (Make Up Your World, 2005)
- 2005 Mozart Echos, Recomposed for Radio DRS2
- 2006 Vastzapinside, CD-trilogy, kold
- 2010 City pavilion Basel-Genf-Zürich, Sound Installation, Expo Shanghai, with Christian Zehnder
- 2010 Mein Vogel, Soloperformance, First Showing Gare du Nord Basel
- 2011 Lovie Lied, CD, with Gilbert Trefzger & Sandra Hüller
- 2011 Requiem Reloaded, Installative Performance, with the Vocalensemble hark!, Basel/Genf/Zürich/Bern/Luzern
- 2016 Ueberleben, Installative Performance, with the choir molto cantabile, Sonnenberg Lucerne
- 2013 BachSpace, with Tamar Halperin & Etienne Abelin, First Showing Gare du Nord
