= The Blue Method =

American musical band

- Origin: Philadelphia, Pennsylvania
- Genres: R&B funk Soul
- Years active: 2001–present
- Label: The Blue Method Records
- Members: Mike Patriarca; Tom Long; Brian Williams; Rah Sungee

The Blue Method is a musical band formed in Philadelphia, Pennsylvania (U.S.) in 2001 by musicians Mike Patriarca and Tom Long (sax). The band added 3 other members: vocalist Brian Williams (introduced by a mutual friend), drummer Theron Shelton, and bassist Rah Sungee.

The sound of The Blue Method is a blend of traditional funk and soul with modern rock. The group members are trained in music theory, and each play a variety of instruments. Their musical influences include James Brown, Earth, Wind & Fire, Parliament-Funkadelic, Al Green, Miles Davis, The Rolling Stones, and Jimi Hendrix.

== Discography ==
The group recorded their debut CD, Kill The Music: Vol. 1 in 2003. The independently released album sold in excess of 7,000 copies. Two years later, The Blue Method was named "Best New Act" by the Home Grown Music Network. Their song "Something Devine" (from the CD Kill The Music: Volume 1 disc) generated airplay and regional interest for the act, who soon toured the East Coast Jazz Festival and Club Circuit.

== Performance venues ==
Most notable venues include the Blue Note in New York City's Greenwich Village; BB Kings Blues Club & Grill in Times Square, World Cafe Live in Philly, and TSOP (The Sound of Philadelphia) Night Club in Atlantic City NJ. The Blue Method has shared stages with local and nationally touring acts including Soulive, Bela Fleck and The Flecktones, Chick Corea, Little Feat, The Disco Biscuits, Spyro Gyra, Ms. Marilyn Marshall, Stephen Tirpak, and John Legend.

== Awards ==
In 2005 The Blue Method won the annual Relix Magazine Jam-off Award and R&B Showcase Magazine's "Best Live Act" 2007.
