= Wagëblë =

Senegalese hip hop duo

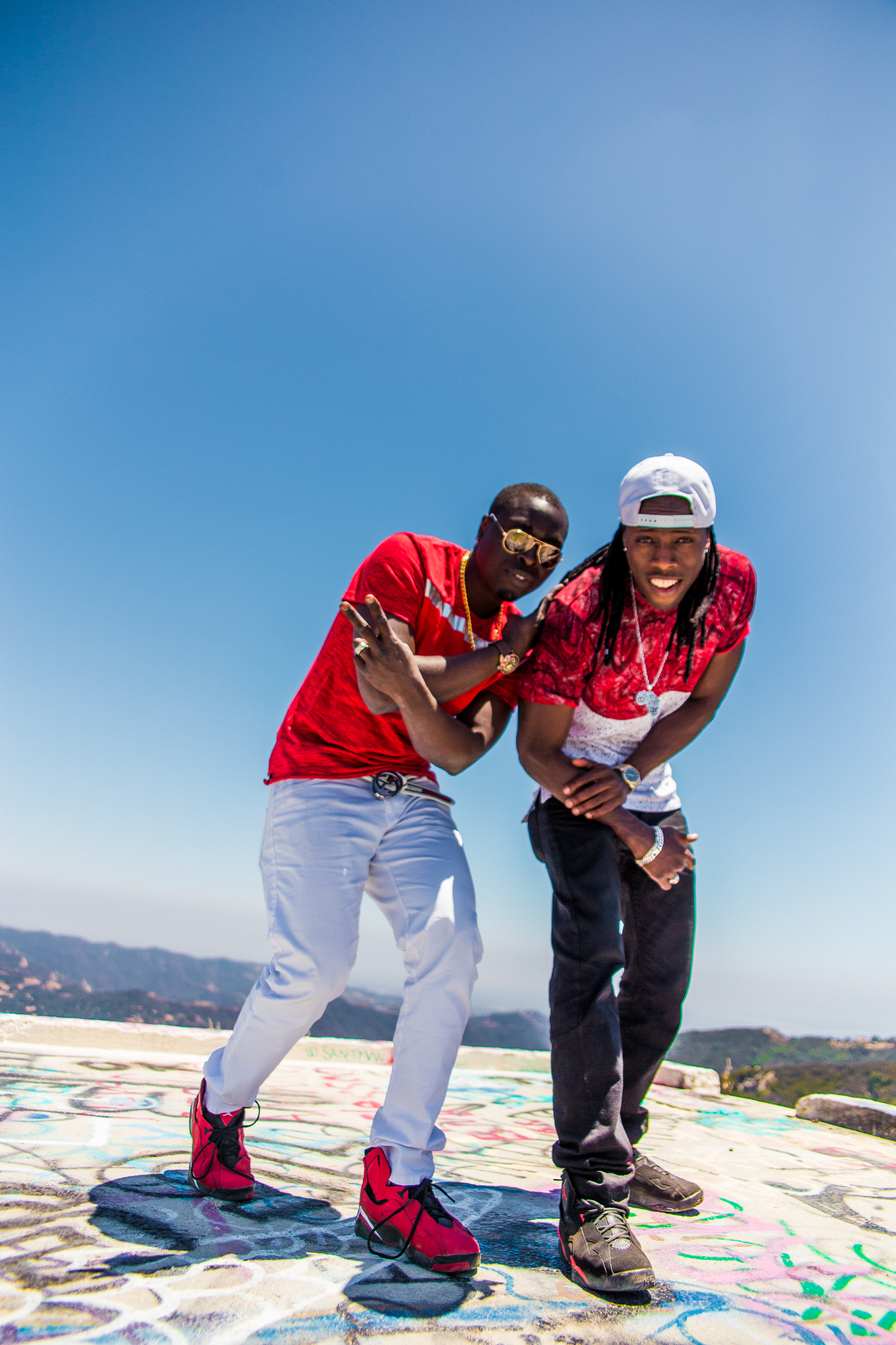
Wageble in Malibu, 2016

Wagëblë are a Senegalese hip hop act. Their debut album was released in 2003.

== About ==
Wagëblë is made up of Eyewitness, a.k.a. Lamine Kandji and Waterflow, a.k.a. Papa Moussa Lo, who began making music together in 1997. Wageble are from Thiaroye, a ghetto on the outskirts of Senegal's capital, Dakar. According to the group, they represent the disenfranchised youth of Senegal and work toward social change.

According to Wagëblë, their style draws on the tradition of the griot - a Senegalese storyteller, oral historian and social critic. Their lyrics take aim at issues like social injustice, political corruption and conflict, while also covering personal topics like love and family. Their name, Wagëblë is a Wolof word that means "from the ghetto." It is also an acronym for Wax Aduna Gëddu Ëttu Baatin Lemu Ëlëk – an expression of the group's philosophy about truth and the spreading of knowledge.

Wagëblë describe their music as Rap Afro - a style heavily influenced by American hip hop, but focusing on themes that speak to, and about, Africa. Their music mixes rap, poetry and spoken word with hip hop beats and traditional African instruments. Wagëblë rap in Wolof, French and English.

== Discography ==
=== Wageb' Rap New Generation (2003) ===
In 2003 Wagëblë released their first studio album, Wageb' Rap New Generation, in collaboration with manager Fred Russel and producer Tom Roger Rumblin' from Norwegian label Two Thou Entertainment. Wagëblë embarked on a Senegal-wide tour shortly after the album's release, beginning with a show at Hip Hop Rally Oslo Dakar, a festival organized by Hip Hop artists, promoters and label representatives from Norway, Sénégal, Kenya and the U.S. Throughout the Wageb' Rap New Generation Tour, Wagëblë also held several free concerts that aimed to raise awareness about AIDS, drug use and racism.

=== Senegal (2005) ===
Wagëblë released their second album, Senegal, in 2005, for which they won best album at Sénégal’s Annual Hip Hop Awards that same year. The Senegal album Tour launched Wagëblë's international career, and for the first time the group played live shows to foreign audiences across the globe, in Norway, Switzerland, Sweden, France, the U.S., Gambia and Guinea. The album, largely considered to be a Hip Hop Galsen (slang for Senegalese hip hop) classic, features Kenyan-Norwegian rapper/singer, Stella Mwangi STL, Kenyan MC Ras Steven, Norwegian rapper Kleen Cut and Ugandan-Norwegian actress Asta Busingye Lydersen, a.k.a. Asta Busingye. The album was produced by Norwegian label, Two thou Entertainment.

=== Message of Hope (2012) ===
Wagëblë released their third studio album, Message of Hope, in 2012. The album was produced by Tom Roger Rumblin, Wagëblë’s own Eyewitness and William NastyCut, and was recorded between Washington DC, New York, Lausanne and Dakar. The album features Cheik Lo, Meta Dia, Jabaman, Crosby and Haddy Ndie and carries an overarching message to the youth of Senegal to create a better world for themselves, by challenging political corruption and outdated tradition.

=== Witness the Flow (2016) ===
Jawale is the first single from Wagëblë's fourth album, Witness the Flow, set to be released later this year by hip hop label Nubian Spirit.
