= Retour à Gorée =

2007 musical documentary road movie

- Directed by: Pierre-Yves Borgeaud
- Screenplay by: Emmanuel Gétaz, Pierre-Yves Borgeaud
- Produced by: CAB PRODUCTIONS, IRIS PRODUCTIONS, Dreampixies
- Starring: Youssou N’Dour, Moncef Genoud
- Cinematography: Camille Cottagnoud
- Edited by: Daniel Gibel
- Music by: Youssou N’Dour, Moncef Genoud, Harmnoy Harmoneerss
- Distributed by: Axiom Films (UK and Ireland)
- Release date: 2007
- Running time: 112 minutes
- Countries: Luxembourg; Senegal; Swaziland

Retour à Gorée (English: Return to Gorée) is a 2007 musical documentary road movie directed by Pierre-Yves Borgeaud, featuring singer Youssou N'Dour's journey along the trail left by slaves and by the jazz music they invented. Youssou N'Dour's challenge is to bring back to Africa a jazz repertoire and to sing those tunes in Goree, the island that today symbolizes the slave trade and stands to commemorate its victims. Guided in his mission by the pianist Moncef Genoud, Youssou N'Dour travels across the United States of America and Europe. Accompanied by some of the world's most exceptional musicians, they meet peoples and well known figures, and create, through concerts, encounters and debates. Their music transcends cultural division.

== Awards ==
- Nyon Visions du Réel (Switzerland) 2007
