= Star Band =

Senegalese band (1959–1980)

- Origin: Dakar
- Genres: Afro-Cuban; Salsa
- Years active: 1959–1980
- Spinoffs: Étoile de Dakar; Orchestra Baobab; Star Number One; Le Super Star de Dakar; Africando
- Past members: Laba Sosseh; Maguette N'Diaye; Youssou N'Dour; Barthélémy Attisso; Balla Sidibe; El Hadji Faye; Ibra Kasse; Pape Seck; Mar Seck; Dexter Johnson; Mady Konate; Papa Diabate; Harisson; Bob Armstrong; José Ramos; Mbousse Mbaye; Lynx Tall

Star Band is a music group from Senegal that was the resident band of Dakar's Miami Club. They, along with the many off-shoots of the band, are responsible for many of the crucial developments in Senegalese popular music. They were formed in 1959 by the owner of the Miami Club, Ibra Kasse. As was typical in Africa at the time, Kasse owned the instruments and was the band leader of the Star Band although he only occasionally played piano. Each one of the band's twelve albums released in Senegal featured a photo of Kasse on the back cover stating that he was the band leader, composer and arranger.

Formed to celebrate Senegal's independence in 1960, Kasse recruited members of other band including Guinea-Jazz and Tropical Jazz. The band has hosted many of Senegal's most influential musicians, Youssou N'Dour being the most notable, and gave birth to several splinter groups including Le Super Star de Dakar, Orchestra Baobab, Star Number One (who considered themselves to be the original Star Band), and Étoile de Dakar. Star Band singers Pape Seck and Laba Sosseh would later go on to sing with Africando.

== Early history ==
Early members of the band included singer Amara Toure and saxophonist Mady Konate who were recruited from Tropical Jazz. They joined saxophonist Dexter Johnson, guitar-player Papa Diabate, bass-player Harisson, and trumpet-player Bob Armstrong who were from the then-defunct Guinea-Jazz. Other members included guitarist José Ramos, Mbousse Mbaye (maracas, guiro, vocals) and Lynx Tall (tumba, vocals). The vocalist Laba Sosseh would join soon afterward after requesting to be allowed to sing a song during one of the band's shows.

== Splinter bands ==
As Ibra Kasse ruled the band with an iron hand, members of the Star Band often got into disagreements with him. Throughout the years, members of the Star Band would quit because they felt that Ibra Kasse was too much of a dictator as band leader. One of the first major defections was when the Nigerian saxophonist Dexter Johnson left the band along with singer Laba Sosseh in 1964 to form Le Super Star de Dakar.

In 1970, most of the younger members of the Star Band left to form Orchestra Baobab who were to serve as the house band for the newly opened Baobab club, a new club that was opened to compete with the Miami Club. After several years as a top band in Dakar, Orchestra Baobab would eventually reform for an international career.

== Star Number One ==
Many members of the Star Band left Ibra Kasse's control following a fight on January 7, 1976. Members of the Star Band ran afoul of Ibra Kasse after the band agreed to appear, without consulting Kasse, at a memorial concert for Laye Mboup, a singer for Orchestra Baobab who was killed in a car crash the previous year. Many members including noted guitarist Yahya Fall left the Star Band and Ibra Kasse's Miami club, creating a musical cooperative where all members were paid equally. At first they called themselves Star Band Un to assert that they were the original Star Band but after Ibra Kasse got government officials to intervene the band chose the name Number One. They used variants of this name over the course of their ten year career.

Number One became one of Dakar's leading bands, eventually becoming the resident band of Dakar's Jandeer Nightclub. Over the course of 10 years together, Star Number One released at least nine LPs and in the late 1970's were considered to be rivals to Orchestra Baobab and the Star Band for the hottest band in Dakar. It is believed that they were the first Senegalese band to record in Paris and that they were the first Senegalese group with their own record label. Their success was so great that all of the singers drove their own Mercedes.

Consisting of up to 15 members, the band had 5 singers: the salsa singers Papa Seck and Maguette Ndiaye, Doudou Sow who sang the Mbalax songs, Pape Djiby Ba who sang ballads, and Mar Seck whose style was broad, signing traditional Wolof material along with Afro-Latin material. The group included Ali Penda N'Dioye, one of Senegal's best trumpet players, and the talented tama (percussion) player, Mamane Fall. Another notable member is the guitarist Yahya Fall whose guitar work stood out for both his use of effects and his style which could approach acid rock and psychedelia. In 1978, the Star Band singer Mar Seck joined the band but soon thereafter left to join Étoile de Dakar, returning to No. 1 de Dakar after Étoile de Dakar splintered. After Pape Seck and Maguette Ndiaye served short stints as the first two band leaders, Yahya Fall took over the role for the final nine years of the bands existence.

== Post-1976 defections ==
After the 1976 defections, Ibra Kasse was forced to hire several new musicians including the then 16 year-old Youssou N'Dour. However, by 1977, several members of the reconfigured Star Band, including N'Dour, left to create their own band, Étoile de Dakar.

== Discography of Star Number One ==
=== Studio albums ===
Sources:

- No. 1, Vol. 2
- No. 1, Vol. 3
- No. 1, Vol. 4
- Star Number One, Maam Bamba, Disques Griot GRLP 7601 also Disques M.A.G. 108
- Star Number One, Jangaake, Disques Griot GRLP 7602 also Disques M.A.G, 106
- Orchestra Number One de Dakar, 78 Vol. 1, Discafrique, darl 16 (1978) also no label NO-001
- Orchestra Number One de Dakar, 78 Vol. 2, Discafrique, darl 17 (1978) also no label NO-002
- Number One du Senegal, Yoro-Kery Goro, no label 1156 A (1980)
- Number One du Senegal, Yoro-Kery Goro - Objectif 2000, Eddy'son Consortium Mondial 1156 (1980)
- Number One du Senegal, Jiko-Nafissatu Njaay, no label 1156 B (1980)
- Number One du Senegal, Jiko-Nafissatu Njaay/Worpe Sanawle, Eddy'son Consortium Mondial 1157 (unknown year)

=== Compilations ===
- 1996: No. 1 de No. 1, Dakar Sound, DKS 010
- 2000: No. 2 de No. 1, Dakar Sound, DKS 019
- 2004: no. III de number 1, Popular African Music, pam adc 307
- 2009: Star Number One de Dakar – La Belle Epoque, Syllart Productions, 000589

=== Contributing artist ===
- 1994: "Vampampero" and "Guantanamera" on Latin Thing, Dakar Sound, DKS 003
- 1994: "Mambay Fary" on Their Thing, Dakar Sound, DKS 004
- 1993: "Noguini, Noguini" on 100% Pure/Double Concentré, Dakar Sound, DKS 006 & 007
- 2008: "Suma Dom Ji" plus 4 more on African Pearls Senegal 70: Musical Effervescence, Discograph 6142032
- 2009: "Kouye Wout" on African Pearls Senegal: Echo Musical, Discograph 6147482
- 2013: "Sama Dialy" and "Li Loumouye Nourou" on Mar Seck, Vagabonde, Teranga Beat, TBCD 018
