= Stimmhorn =

Stimmhorn was a Swiss band playing experimental ethno-music.

This band was formed in 1996 by Balthasar Streiff and Christian Zehnder. The band's name refers to their music, which consists mainly of their two voices performing traditional Swiss yodelling and horn instruments. The band's instrumentation and technique is multifaceted. Zehnder sings normally, sings overtone, and yodels. He also plays the wippkordeon, a bandoneon (concertina), a bandurria (a small guitar-like instrument similar a mandolin), an organ pipe and a hang (percussion instrument), among others. Streiff sings and plays horn like instruments, including the alphorn, double alphorn, alpofon (a system developed by his own instrument), büchel, cornet, baroque trumpet, cornetto and tuba.

In addition, the duo worked with guest musicians, such as the overtone singing group Huun-Huur-Tu from Tuva or Tomek Kolczynski (kold electronics) on their album Igloo and on a production of Faust.

In November 2009, Zehnder and Streiff played for the last time as "Stimmhorn".

== Awards ==
They achieved national and international awards, including:

- 1997 First Swiss Kleinkunstpreis, Prix de la scène Suisse 1997
- 1997 Z Star of the Year, for outstanding musical performance in Munich in 1997.
- 1998 Iron Eversteiner (European ethno-music award) Jury and Audience Award

== Discography ==
- Heimatklänge (Soundtrack, 2007)
- Igloo (stimmhorn & kold electronics, 2004)
- Inland (2001)
- Schnee (1997)
- Melken (1996)
