= Jimi Mbaye =

Senegalese guitarist (1957–2025)

Mamadou "Jimi" Mbaye (2 October 1957 – 12 February 2025) was a Senegalese guitarist best known for his work with Youssou N'dour. Mbaye developed a unique Senegalese guitar style in which he made his Fender Stratocaster sound like local instruments such as the kora or xalam.

== Background ==
Born in Dakar, French Senegal on 2 October 1957, into a family of guewels (griots), Mamadou Mbaye was the grandson of Oumy Seck and Djiby Salif Seck, descendants of Matakou and Massata Seck.

His father, who was very pious, was opposed to his children playing music. When he was ten years old, Mbaye built his first guitar out of fishing line and gasoline cans. At twenty he had scraped up enough money to buy a secondhand Fender Stratocaster. Mbaye was just as determined to get a guitar as he was to make it in the competitive Dakar music scene. Early on he met Youssou N'Dour and together they became rising stars on Senegal's club scene, playing mbalax music. They created the "Super Étoile" band together in 1981 and were musically inseparable ever afterwards.

Jimi Mbaye died on 12 February 2025, at the age of 67.

== Style ==
Mbaye was different from other guitarists because of his unique style. Youssou N'dour said "No one, no one plays guitar like Jimi Mbaye. His playing style is unique". Mbaye succeeded in transposing the African traditional sounds of khalam (Ngoni) and kora onto his electric Fender Stratocaster. Carlos Santana and Mbaye met during a tour in Los Angeles where Carlos acknowledged that: "Jimi is a very special and incredible guitarist".

== Albums ==
Mbaye released three solo albums, "Dakar Heart", "Yaye Digalma" and "Khare Dounya". The last was recorded in Jimi's new studio Studio Dogo, in which he produced other artists.

== Later works ==
Mbaye recorded six top-selling major-label albums with N'Dour before taking a leave of absence to record his own solo album, released in 1997, "Dakar Heart". Recorded at N'Dour's Studio Xippi, "Dakar Heart" features N'Dour's band "Super Étoile". Mbaye was back at N'Dour's side and very much an integral part of Youssou's "Super Étoile" band. In fact, Youssou often traveled abroad with only Mbaye as acoustic guitar accompanist, as he did in June 1998 for performances in Paris as guests of Brazilian performer Gilberto Gil at the Olympia Theatre.

A member of Youssou N'Dour's Super Étoile Band from 1979 onwards, Mbaye was one of Senegal's most influential guitarists. Often compared to Jimi Hendrix and Robert Johnson, Mbaye forged a unique blend of traditional Senegalese roots music and American pop and R&B. Recording a solo album, Dakar Heart, with help from Super Étoile Band musicians in 1997, Mbaye showcased his inventive, kora-derived guitar playing and singing in Wolof, English, and French. Billboard called him "a prodigious world talent", while Rhythm referred to him as "one of Senegal's most exciting musicians". Music played an ongoing role in Mbaye's life. As a youngster, he performed on a self-invented instrument made from discarded garbage cans and nylon fishing line in the streets of Dakar. Mbaye continued to be the backbone of N'Dour's band. In addition to co-writing the 1994 single "Mame Bamba", he made valuable contributions to six N'Dour recordings. Mbaye and N'Dour increasingly performed as a duo.

== Collaborations ==
His third album called "Khare Dounya" was released in 2012. "Khare Dounya" means "Fight for Life". He recorded this album with his band "Group Dogo". He started to tour with his band around Senegal and the West African region.

After opening his studio, Mbaye collaborated with a few artists from Africa and other regions. One notable project was the album Daxaar, which was recorded at his Dogo studio in Dakar, featuring American jazz drummer Steve Reid.

He was friendly with many musicians. During gigs, he would rehearse with other artists to create new songs they could record later to advance their own careers, and often produced for and performed with musicians in Senegal.

Mbaye quit Super Étoile de Dakar to work on his own solo career and started to tour with his "Group Dogo" all around the world. Mbaye rejoined Super Étoile in 2017. He played in Bercy 2017 together with Habib Faye.

In June 2025, Youssou N'Dour released a tribute to his late friend entitled "Jimi Mbaye Dogo (Hommage du Super Etoile de Dakar)".
