= Youssou N'Dour =

Senegalese politician and musician (born 1959)

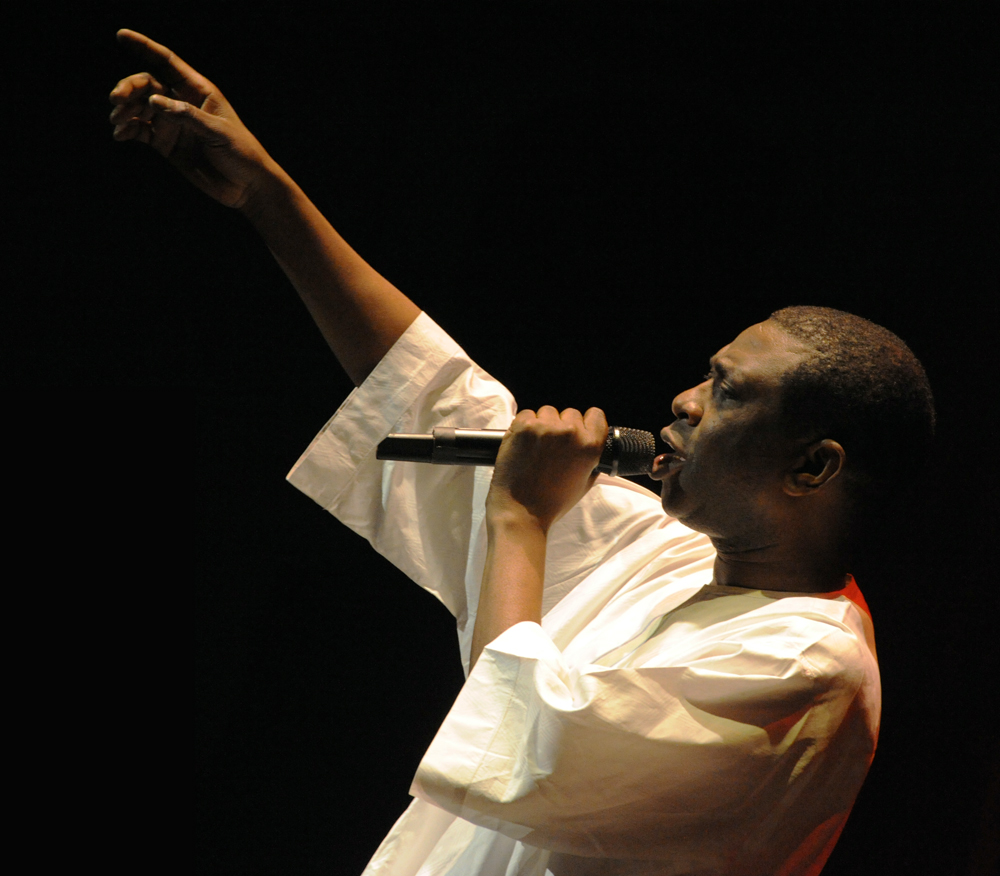
- N'Dour in 2009

Minister of Tourism of Senegal
- In office 5 April 2012 – September 2013
- Prime Minister: Abdoul Mbaye
- Preceded by: Thierno Lo

Personal details
- Born: 1 October 1959 (age 66) Dakar, Mali Federation
- Musical career
- Also known as: Madjiguène Ndour
- Genres: Mbalax; Afro-pop; Desert blues; Senegalese; West African; World; Worldbeat
- Occupations: Singer; percussionist
- Years active: 1970s–present
- Labels: Prince Arts; Columbia; Chaos; Real World; Nonesuch
- Formerly of: Star Band; Étoile de Dakar; Super Diamono

Youssou "Madjiguène" N'Dour (also Ndour, French: [jusu (ɛ)nduʁ]; Wolof: Yuusu "Maajigéen" Nduur [juːsu ⁿd̺uːɾ]; born 1 October 1959) is a Senegalese singer, songwriter, musician, composer, and politician. N'Dour helped develop a style of popular Senegambian music known as mbalax, a genre that has sacred origins in the Serer music njuup tradition and ndut initiation ceremonies. From April 2012 to September 2013, he was Senegal's Minister of Tourism.

Rolling Stone described him in 2004 as "perhaps the most famous singer alive" in Senegal and much of Africa, and ranked him in 2023 at number 69 on its list of the 200 Greatest Singers of All Time. N'Dour is the subject of the award-winning films Return to Gorée (2007) directed by Pierre-Yves Borgeaud and Youssou N'Dour: I Bring What I Love (2008) directed by Elizabeth Chai Vasarhelyi. In 2006, N'Dour portrayed Olaudah Equiano in the film Amazing Grace.

== Early life ==
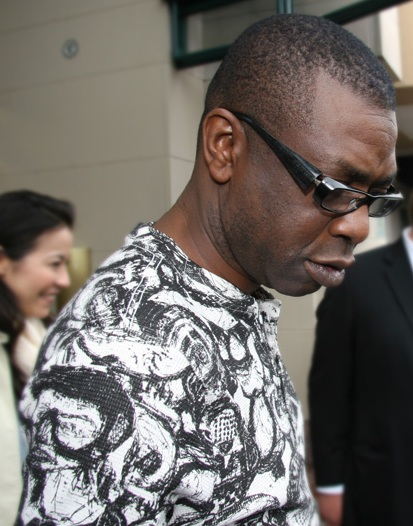
N'Dour at the 2008 Toronto International Film Festival

Ethnically, N'Dour is Serer, born to a Serer father and a Toucouleur mother. However, culturally, N'Dour is Wolof. He was born in Dakar. He started performing at the age of 12 and would later perform regularly with the Star Band, Dakar's most popular group during the 1970s.

Despite N'Dour's maternal connection to the traditional griot caste, he was not raised in that tradition, which he learned instead from his sibling. Although patrilineally from the noble N'Dour family, his parents' world-view encouraged a modern outlook, leaving him open to two cultures and thereby inspiring N'Dour's identity as a modern griot. As a Mouride disciple, taalibé in Wolof, a Muslim of the Mouride brotherhood, one of the large four Sufi orders in Senegambia, he often incorporated aspects of Islamic music and chants into his work.

== Music career ==
=== 1970s: Beginnings with joining the "Star Band" and its spin-offs ===
At the age of 15, Youssou N'Dour joined a band called Diamono and, in 1975, toured with this band in West Africa.

In 1976 when N'Dour was 16 years old, he signed a contract to sing with Ibra Kasse's Star Band at Kasse's "Miami club" in Dakar where he would become a sensation. In 1978, N'Dour followed, as several members of the Star Band did, some musicians that would form Étoile de Dakar, a band that made important contributions to Senegal's newly-evolving musical style called mbalax, which incorporated traditional Senegalese music into the Latin styles that had dominated Senegalese popular music.

Although they quickly became one of the city's most popular bands, the group was short-lived due to internal problems. "Étoile de Dakar" split into two groups: "Étoile 2000" and "Super Étoile de Dakar". The latter group included N'Dour, guitarist Jimi Mbaye, bassist Habib Faye, and tama (talking drum) player Assane Thiam. Super Étoile de Dakar produced four albums on cassette in just a few months and eventually evolved into N'Dour's backing band.

=== 1990s: Continued mainstream success as eclectic and genre-crossover artist ===
By 1991, he had opened his own recording studio, and, by 1995, his own record label, Jololi.

N'Dour is one of the most celebrated African musicians in history. His mix of traditional Senegalese "mbalax" with eclectic influences, ranging from Cuban rumba to jazz, soul and hip-hop, has won him an international fan base of millions. In the West, N'Dour has collaborated with Peter Gabriel, Axelle Red, Sting, Alan Stivell, Bran Van 3000, Neneh Cherry, Wyclef Jean, Paul Simon, Bruce Springsteen, Tracy Chapman, James Newton Howard, Branford Marsalis, Ryuichi Sakamoto, Dido, Lou Reed, Bruce Cockburn, and others.

The New York Times described his voice as an "arresting tenor, a supple weapon deployed with prophetic authority". N'Dour's work absorbed the entire Senegalese musical spectrum, often filtered through the lens of genre-defying rock or pop music from outside Senegalese culture.

In July 1993, Africa Opera composed by N'Dour premiered at the Opéra Garnier for the French Festival Paris quartier d'été. In 1994, N'Dour released his biggest international hit single, the trilingual "7 Seconds", a duet sung with Neneh Cherry. He wrote and performed the official anthem of the 1998 FIFA World Cup with Axelle Red "La Cour des Grands (Do You Mind If I Play)". Folk Roots magazine described him as the African Artist of the Century. He toured internationally for thirty years. He won his first American Grammy Award (best contemporary world music album) for his CD Egypt in 2005.

=== 2000s: Contemporary career as mass media owner and actor ===
In 2002, N'Dour was honoured with a Prince Claus Award, under that year's theme "Languages and transcultural forms of expression".

He is the proprietor of Groupe Futurs Médias, a mass media company founded in 2003 which owns L'Observateur, one of the most widespread newspapers in Senegal, the radio station "RFM" (Radio Futurs Médias), which like the newspaper was also started in 2003, and the TV channel "TFM" (Télé Futurs Médias), which broadcasts since 2010. Both the radio and the tv headquarters were attacked in 2020 during the COVID-19 pandemic.

In 2006, N'Dour played the role of the African-British abolitionist Olaudah Equiano in the movie Amazing Grace, which chronicled the efforts of William Wilberforce to end slavery in the British Empire. In 2008, N'Dour offered one of his compositions, Bébé, for the French singer Cynthia Brown.

In 2011, N'Dour was awarded an honorary doctoral degree in music from Yale University. In 2013, N'Dour won a share of Sweden's $150,000 Polar music prize for promoting understanding between faiths as well as for his music.

He got a 2026 Grammy Awards nomination for his album Eclairer le monde - Light the World in the Best Global Music Album category.

== Activism ==
N'Dour was nominated as Goodwill Ambassador of the Food and Agriculture Organization of the United Nations (FAO) on 16 October 2000.

In Senegal, N'Dour became a powerful cultural icon, actively involved in social issues. In 1985, he organized a concert for the release of Nelson Mandela. He was a featured performer in the 1988 worldwide Amnesty International Human Rights Now! Tour collaborating with Lou Reed on a version of the Peter Gabriel song "Biko" which was produced by Richard James Burgess and featured on the Amnesty International benefit album The Secret Policeman's Third Ball. He worked with the United Nations and UNICEF, and he started Project Joko to open internet cafés in Africa and to connect Senegalese communities around the world.

In 2003, N'Dour cancelled an upcoming American tour in order to publicly deny support for the upcoming American invasion of Iraq. In a public statement explaining his decision, N'Dour said:

It is my strong conviction that the responsibility for disarming Iraq should rest with the United Nations. As a matter of conscience I question the United States government's apparent intention to commence war in Iraq. I believe that coming to America at this time would be perceived in many parts of the world--rightly or wrongly--as support for this policy, and that, as a consequence, it is inappropriate to perform in the US at this juncture.

He performed in three of the Live 8 concerts (in Live 8 concert, London, Live 8 concert, Paris and at the Live 8 concert, Eden Project in Cornwall) on 2 July 2005, with Dido. He covered John Lennon's "Jealous Guy" for the 2007 CD Instant Karma: The Amnesty International Campaign to Save Darfur. N'Dour appeared in a joint Spain-Senegal ad campaign to inform the African public about the dramatic consequences of illegal immigration. He participated in the Stock Exchange of Visions project in 2007.

In 2008, he joined the Fondation Chirac's honour committee. The same year, Youssou N'Dour's microfinance organization named Birima ("Birima" is also a song's title) was launched with the collaboration of United Colors of Benetton.

In 2009, he released his song "Wake Up (It's Africa Calling)" under a Creative Commons license to help IntraHealth International in their IntraHealth Open campaign to bring open source health applications to Africa. The song was remixed by a variety of artists including Nas, Peter Buck of R.E.M., and Duncan Sheik to help raise money for the campaign.

N'Dour is a supporter of the Campaign for the Establishment of a United Nations Parliamentary Assembly, an organisation which advocates for democratic reformation of the United Nations.

N'Dour is a member of the Canadian charity Artists Against Racism.

== Political career ==
At the beginning of 2012, he announced plans to stand as a candidate in the 2012 Senegalese presidential election, competing against President Abdoulaye Wade. However, he was disqualified from running in the election over the legitimacy of the signatures he had collected to endorse his campaign. N'Dour backed the opposition candidate Macky Sall, who defeated Wade in a second round of voting in March 2012. N'Dour was appointed as Minister of Culture and Tourism in April 2012 as part of the cabinet of new Prime Minister Abdoul Mbaye. The story of N'Dour's presidential campaign was filmed for the PBS TV program Sound Tracks: Music Without Borders. Later his portfolio was modified and he was appointed as Minister of Tourism and Leisure. He was dismissed from that post on 2 September 2013, when a new government under Prime Minister Aminata Touré was appointed. N'Dour was instead appointed as Special Adviser to the President, with the rank of minister, and tasked with promoting the country abroad.

== Awards and nominations ==
Award	Year (Note: Indicates the year of ceremony. Each year is linked to the article about the awards held that year, wherever possible.)	Category	Nominee(s)	Result	Ref.
Brit Awards	1995	International Male Solo Artist	Himself	Nominated	
Danish Music Awards	1995	Best International Song	"7 Seconds"	Won	
Edison Award	1994	Best Pop International	The Guide (Wommat)	Won	
Grammy Awards	1993	Best World Music Album	Eyes Open	Nominated	
Grammy Awards	1995	Best World Music Album	The Guide (Wommat)	Nominated	
Grammy Awards	2001	Best World Music Album	Joko: The Link	Nominated	
Grammy Awards	2004	Best Contemporary World Music Album	Nothing's In Vain (Coono du Réér)	Nominated	
Grammy Awards	2005	Best Contemporary World Music Album	Egypt	Won	
Grammy Awards	2009	Best Contemporary World Music Album	Rokku Mi Rokka	Nominated	
Ivor Novello Awards	1995	International Hit of the Year	"7 Seconds"	Nominated	
La Mar de Música Awards	2020	Festival Award	Himself	Won	
Lunas del Auditorio	2004	Espectaculo Alternativo	Himself	Nominated	
MOBO Awards	2000	Best World Music Act	Himself	Nominated	
MOBO Awards	2001	Best World Music Act	Himself	Nominated	
MOBO Awards	2003	Best World Music Act	Himself	Nominated	
MOBO Awards	2004	Best World Music Act	Himself	Nominated	
MOBO Awards	2005	Best African Act	Himself	Won	
MTV Europe Music Awards	1994	Best Song	"7 Seconds"	Won	
Montreal International Jazz Festival	2011	Antonio Carlos Jobim Award	Himself	Won	
Polar Music Prize	2013	Polar Music Prize	Himself	Won	
Praemium Imperiale	2017	Music	Himself	Won	
Victoires de la Musique	2001	World Music Album of the Year	Joko	Nominated	
Victoires de la Musique	2011	World Music Album of the Year	Dakar – Kingston	Nominated	
Urban Music Awards	2023	Artist of the Year (Africa)	Himself	Nominated	

== Discography ==
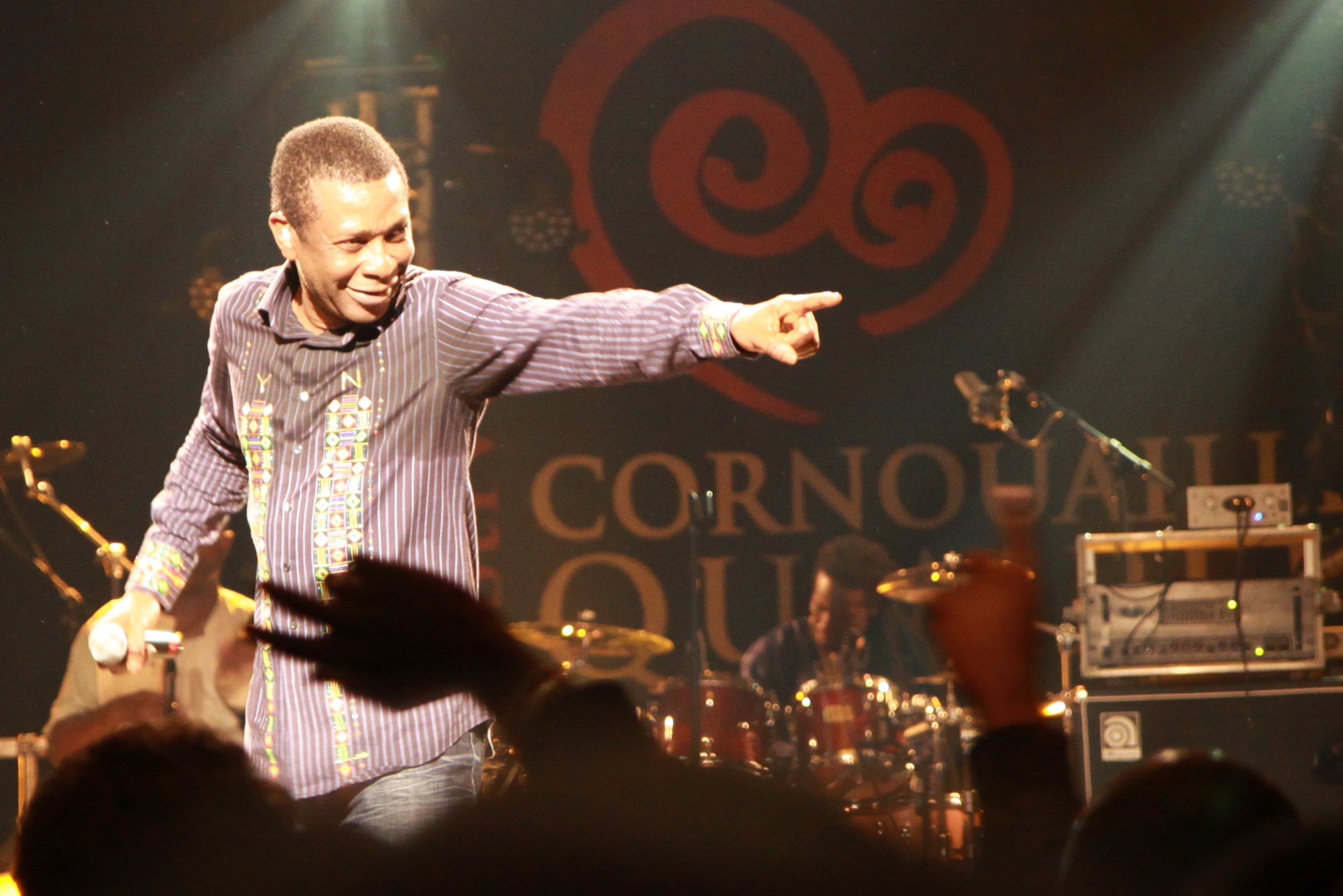
N'Dour at the 2010 Festival de Cornouaille at Quimper, France.

=== Early cassettes ===
This numbered series of cassettes was released in Senegal between 1982 and 1988, and was credited to Youssou N'Dour & Le Super Etoile de Dakar.

- Vol 1 Tabaski
- Vol 2 Ndakarou
- Vol 3 Independance
- Vol 4 Banjoly N'Diaye
- Vol 5 Yarou
- Vol 6 Marguedy
- Vol 7 Daby
- Vol 8 Immigres
- Vol 9 Africa
- Vol 10 Ndobine
- Vol 11 Bekoor
- Vol 12 Jamm
- Vol 13 Kocc Barma
- Vol 14 Gainde
- Vol 15 Set

=== Albums ===
- Ndiadiane Ndiaye (1982)
- Mouride (1982)
- Independance Vol. 3 (1982)
- Show!!! A Abidjan (1983)
- Diongoma (1983)
- Immigrés (1984)
- Djamil Inédits 84-85 (1985)
- Nelson Mandela (1985)
- The Lion (1989)
- Set (1990)
- Eyes Open (1992)
- The Guide (Wommat) (1994)
- Gainde – Voices from the Heart of Africa (1995)
- Djamil (1996) – anthology
- Lii (1996)
- St. Louis (1997)
- Special Fin D'annee Plus (1998)
- Le Grand Bal a Évry (1999)
- Rewmi (1999)
- Joko: From Village to Town (2000)
- Joko: The Link (2000)
- Le Grand Bal (2000)
- Ba Tay (2001)
- Le Grand Bal a Bercy (2001)
- Nothing's in Vain (Coono Du Réér) (2002)
- Kirikou Et La Sorciere (2004)
- Egypt (2004)
- Jigeen Gni (2005) – single
- Alsaama Day (2007)
- Rokku Mi Rokka (2007) – No. 30 in Rolling Stone's Top 50 Albums of 2007.
- I Bring What I Love (2008) – film soundtrack
- Special Fin D'annee: Salagne-Salagne (2009)
- Dakar – Kingston (2010)
- Mbalakh Dafay Wakh (2011)
- Fatteliku (2014)
- #Senegaal Rek (2016)
- Africa Rekk (2016)
- Seeni Valeurs (2017)
- Respect (2018)
- History (2019)
- Mbalax (2021)

=== Compilation albums ===
- Special Noël (1993)
- The Best Of Youssou N'Dour (1995)
- Euleuk Sibir with Omar Pene (You et Pene) (1996)
- Immigrés/Bitim Rew (1997)
- Inedits 84–85 (1997)
- Best of the 80's (1998)
- Hey You: The Essential Collection 1988–1990 (1998)
- Birth Of A Star (2001)
- Youssou N'Dour and His Friends (2002)
- The Rough Guide To Youssou N'Dour & Etoile de Dakar (2002)
- Céy You (2003)
- Le Grand Bal: Paris-Bercy (2003)
- 4.4.44 (2004)
- Bercy 2004 vol. 1 & 2 (2004)
- 7 Seconds: The Best Of Youssou N'Dour (Remastered) (2004)
- Bercy 2005 (2005)
- Le Grand Bal: Bercy 2008 (2008)
- From Senegal to the world (2012)
- Le Grand Bal: Bercy 2013 (2013)
- Africa Rekk (Réédition) (2017)
- Raxas Bercy 2017 (2017)
- Le Grand Show (2019)

=== Collaborations ===
- 1986: So by Peter Gabriel – backing vocals on "In Your Eyes".
- 1989: Passion by Peter Gabriel – backing vocals on "A Different Drum", "Passion".
- 1989: Beauty by Ryuichi Sakamoto - vocals on "Diabaram"
- 1990: Shaking the Tree: Sixteen Golden Greats by Peter Gabriel – "Mercy Street" and "Shaking the Tree".
- 1990: Le mani e l'anima by Italian singer Claudio Baglioni – "Oltre" album.
- 2000: Album Solidays – song "Qui sait?" for the association Solidarité sida, with Anggun, Patrick Bruel, Stephan Eicher, Faudel, Peter Gabriel, Lââm, Lokua Kanza, Nourith, Axelle Red & Zucchero.
- 2003: Hit by Peter Gabriel – backing vocals on "In Your Eyes".
- 2005: Live 8: One Day, One Concert, One World DVD – N'Dour sings "7 Seconds" with Dido.
- 2005: Live 8 Paris DVD – N'Dour sings at the end of the concert "New Africa/Lima Weesu".
- 2006: An Other Cup by Yusuf – backing vocals on "The Beloved".
- 2007: Instant Karma: The Amnesty International Campaign To Save Darfur – N'Dour sings "Jealous Guy".
- 2008: Bord Ezanga Kombo by Koffi Olomide – N'Dour on "Festival".
- 2009: Les Amis Du Monde with the Lebanese diva Majida El Roumi for the Francophone Games Opening 2009 in Beirut.
- 2020: Twice as Tall by Burna Boy – on track 4
- 2020: L'Ours with Christophe Maé

=== Singles ===
Single	Year	Peak chart positions								Album
Single	Year	UK	AUS	FRA	BEL (WAL)	SWI	GER	US	US Alt Rock	Album
"The Rubberband Man / Nelson Mandela"	1985	—	—	—	—	—	—	—	—	Nelson Mandela
"Shango Affair"	1988	—	—	—	—	—	—	—	—	Black Mic Mac 2 OST
"Shakin' the Tree" (with Peter Gabriel)	1989	61	—	—	—	—	—	—	9	The Lion
"The Lion / Gaïende"	1989	—	—	—	—	—	—	—	—	The Lion
"Toxiques"	1990	—	—	—	—	—	—	—	—	Set
"Africa Remembers"	1992	—	—	—	—	—	—	—	—	Eyes Open
"7 Seconds" (with Neneh Cherry)	1994	3	3	1	1	1	3	98	—	The Guide (Wommat)
"Mame Bamba"	1994	—	—	—	—	—	—	—	—	The Guide (Wommat)
"Undecided"	1995	53	145	—	—	—	92	—	—	The Guide (Wommat)
"Chimes of Freedom"	1995	—	—	—	—	—	—	—	—	The Guide (Wommat)
"How Come" (with Canibus)	1998	52	—	—	—	—	—	—	—	Bulworth OST
"La Cour Des Grands (A Ton Tour De Jouer)" (with Axelle Red)	1998	—	—	16	31	—	—	—	—	official hymn of 1998 FIFA World Cup
"My Hope Is in You"	1999	—	—	—	—	—	—	—	—	Joko - From Village to Town
"Birima"	2000	—	—	—	—	—	—	—	—	Joko - From Village to Town
"So Many Men" (with Pascal Obispo)	2002	—	—	35	27	85	—	—	—	Nothing's in Vain (Coono Du Réér)
"#Senegaal rekk" (with Le Super Etoile)	2016	—	—	189	—	—	—	—	—	
"—" denotes a recording that did not chart or was not released in that territory.

== Films ==
Amazing Grace (2006)

- As Olaudah Equiano. "A central figure in the abolitionist movement in Great Britain, Olaudah Equiano (c. 1745–97) wrote an eyewitness account of his life as a slave and of his work in the anti-slavery movement: The Interesting Narrative of the Life of Olaudah Equiano."
- As a musician on the film's soundtrack.

Retour à Gorée (2007)

- As himself, journeying from the island of Gorée to the USA and back, exploring the origins of jazz, which go back to the era of slave trade in Africa, through a concert performed by an international group of artists.

Youssou N'Dour: I Bring What I Love (2008)

- As himself, through the recording of the Egypt album and its repercussions.
- Released in the US on DVD by Oscilloscope Laboratories.
