= Live in Athens 1987 =

Concert film and video album by Peter Gabriel

Live in Athens: The Full Recorded Show

Video by Peter Gabriel
- Released: 2013
- Recorded: October 1987
- Venue: Lycabettus Theatre (Athens)
- Genre: Rock
- Length: 176 minutes
- Label: Eagle Vision; Real World
- Director: Michael Chapman
- Producer: Sandy Lieberson

Peter Gabriel chronology
Still Growing Up: Live & Unwrapped (2005)	Live in Athens: The Full Recorded Show (2013)	Back to Front: Live in London (2014)

Live in Athens 1987

Live album by Peter Gabriel
- Released: 16 October 2020(UK); 6 November 2020 (US)
- Recorded: October 1987
- Venue: Lycabettus Theatre (Athens)
- Length: 106:14
- Label: Real World
- Producer: Peter Gabriel

Peter Gabriel chronology
Flotsam and Jetsam (2019)	Live in Athens 1987 (2020)	i/o (2023)

Live in Athens 1987 is a DVD and live album by the English rock musician Peter Gabriel. The DVD for Live in Athens 1987 was released in 2013 and the album was released seven years later.

The concert was recorded over the course of three nights at the Lycabettus Theatre in Athens during his This Way Up Tour in 1987. Much of the footage had previously been released in video form for Gabriel's POV concert film. Hart Perry captured the footage on an 8mm format for the original POV, which was later remastered for the DVD edition. The audio from the performance was later included on the 25th anniversary box set for Gabriel's So album.

The DVD remaster of POV was released in 2013 under the title Live in Athens 1987: The Fully Recorded Show, which included two songs not originally found on POV, namely "Intruder" and "Here Comes the Flood. This collection also featured the full performance of Youssou N'Dour set that opened Gabriel's shows, the music video for "Sledgehammer" in 5.1 surround sound audio, and a 1986 interview that Gabriel conducted with Paul Gambaccini on BBC Radio 1. The two-disc set was also bundled with the Play video album, which included 23 of Gabriel's music videos.

The cover art for the album was a photo taken by Armando Gallo, who also captured the cover photograph for Gabriel's Plays Live in 1983. Guido Harari supplied the image on the back of the album, which shows Gabriel falling backwards into the audience. The setlist from Live in Athens 1987 shares eight songs from the Plays Live album. Matt Colton half-speed mastered the album at Alchemy Mastering. "Quiet and Alone", a song taken from Gabriel's 1985 Birdy album, was included in the end credits for Live in Athens 1987.

== Track listing ==
=== Video album ===
All songs written and performed by Peter Gabriel, except where noted

No.	Title	Writer(s)	Performer	Length
1.	"Immigres"	Youssou N'Dour	Youssou N'Dour, Super Étoile de Dakar	8:41
2.	"Kocc Barma"	N'Dour, Habib Faye	N'Dour, Super Étoile de Dakar	8:14
3.	"Nelson Mandela"	N'Dour	N'Dour, Super Étoile de Dakar	7:18
4.	"Ndobine"	N'Dour	Youssou N'Dour, Super Étoile de Dakar	8:38
5.	"Sama Dome/My Daughter"	N'Dour, Faye, David Sancious	N'Dour, Super Étoile de Dakar	8:48
6.	"This is the Picture (Excellent Birds)"	Peter Gabriel, Laurie Anderson		5:57
7.	"San Jacinto"			7:55
8.	"Shock the Monkey"			6:39
9.	"Family Snapshot"			5:44
10.	"Intruder"			5:44
11.	"Games Without Frontiers"			4:36
12.	"No Self Control"			6:17
13.	"Mercy Street"			9:09
14.	"The Family and the Fishing Net"			7:18
15.	"Don't Give Up"			7:58
16.	"Solsbury Hill"			5:15
17.	"Lay Your Hands on Me"			8:45
18.	"Sledgehammer"			6:04
19.	"Here Comes the Flood"			3:14
20.	"In Your Eyes"		Gabriel, N'Dour	13:23
21.	"Biko"			12:38

=== CD ===
All tracks are written by Peter Gabriel, except "This Is the Picture (Excellent Birds)", written with Laurie Anderson.

Side A
No.	Title	Length
1.	"This is the Picture (Excellent Birds)"	5:55
2.	"San Jacinto"	7:32
3.	"Shock the Monkey"	6:39
4.	"Family Snapshot"	4:36

Side B
No.	Title	Length
1.	"Intruder"	5:31
2.	"Games Without Frontiers"	5:25
3.	"No Self Control"	6:16
4.	"Mercy Street"	9:15

Side C
No.	Title	Length
1.	"The Family and the Fishing Net"	7:06
2.	"Don't Give Up"	8:16
3.	"Solsbury Hill"	5:10
4.	"Lay Your Hands on Me"	6:15

Side D
No.	Title	Length
1.	"Sledgehammer"	5:07
2.	"Here Comes the Flood"	2:48
3.	"In Your Eyes"	10:40
4.	"Biko"	9:43

== Personnel ==
- Peter Gabriel – vocals, keyboards
- David Rhodes – guitar, backing vocals
- Tony Levin – bass guitar, backing vocals
- David Sancious – keyboards
- Manu Katché – drums

Special guests

- Youssou N'Dour and Le Super Étoile de Dakar

== Chart performance ==
Chart performance for the DVD version of Live in Athens
Chart (2013)	Peak position
UK Music DVD (OCC)	57

Chart performance for the album version of Live in Athens
Chart (2020)	Peak position
Belgian Albums (Ultratop Wallonia)	196
German Albums (Offizielle Top 100)	48
