= This Way Up Tour =

1986–87 concert tour by Peter Gabriel

- Tour by Peter Gabriel
- Poster to the concert in Offenbach, West Germany
- Associated album: So
- Start date: 7 November 1986
- End date: 9 October 1987
- Legs: 2
- No. of shows: 93

Peter Gabriel concert chronology
- A Conspiracy of Hope (1986); This Way Up Tour (1986–87); Human Rights Now! (1988)

The This Way Up Tour was a concert tour mounted by the English singer-songwriter Peter Gabriel to promote his 1986 album So. The concert tour spanned 93 shows, starting on 7 November 1986 in Rochester, New York and concluding on 9 October 1987 in Athens, Greece. It was broken up into two legs, with the first lasting one month through the middle of December and the second commencing in June of 1987, which covered the continents of both North America and Europe.

Gabriel's touring band consisted of several musicians who had played on So, including Tony Levin, David Rhodes, and Manu Katché. The setlist comprised around half of So, with the remaining songs originating from earlier albums in Gabriel's discography. Youssou N'Dour served as the opening act throughout the duration of the tour.

== Background ==
In June 1986, Gabriel performed at A Conspiracy of Hope, which was arranged to celebrate the 25th anniversary of Amnesty International. Bono asked Gabriel to participate in the concerts and told him that his song "Biko" had "opened him up to Africa". The Conspiracy of Hope concerts required Gabriel to reschedule his This Way Up Tour further back than he had originally planned.

Gabriel embarked on the This Way Up Tour in November 1986 with a touring band consisting of Tony Levin, David Rhodes, Manu Katché, and David Sancious. The setlist consisted of songs from Gabriels So studio album along with several other songs from Gabriel's discography. Whereas the audiences of several of his previous tours consisted of "denim guys and intellectuals." according to Rhodes, the This Way Up Tour marked a shift toward larger and younger crowds with a more equal gender balance.

"San Jacinto" served as first song of the setlist for both the 1986 and 1987 legs of the tour and began with an extended polyrhythmic instrumental sequence. Youssou N'Dour, who served as the tour's opening act with his band Super Étoile de Dakar, joined Gabriel onstage to sing "In Your Eyes". Some members from N'Dour's band played horns on "Big Time". Whereas the studio recording of "Don't Give Up" was sung as a duet with Kate Bush, Gabriel covered all of the vocals on the song during this concert tour. The exception to this was when Bush sang the song with Gabriel during his concert on 28 June 1987 in Earl's Court, which marked the only time Bush ever performed the song live with him.

== Staging ==
For the show's illumination, four banks of light were installed onto a set of crane arms that maneuvered throughout the stage via a railed track. During "San Jacinto", which served as the opening song of the set, the four moving crane arms would direct beams of light at Gabriel, in some cases a few inches away from his face. On "Red Rain", the lights were calibrated to create the illusion of rain droplets falling.

The lighting cranes were used extensively on both "No Self Control" and "Mercy Street". On "No Self Control", the telescoping lighting arms would descend upon Gabriel "like pterodactyls scrutinizing their prey" according to Pete Bishop of The Pittsburgh Press. These lights would then hover over Gabriel's body as he began the next song of the set, "Mercy Street". "This is the Picture (Excellent Birds)", featured an extended introduction where Gabriel and members of his touring band would line up at the front of the stage while playing mobile instruments, with Katché playing a MIDI rhythm stick and Sancious using a portable remote keyboard. Gabriel would also introduce the members of the band during the introduction of this song.

On "Big Time", the light fixtures were programmed to create what the Toronto Star described as "a massive display of white light" that "exploded and swirled around the arena." Gabriel would conclude "Lay Your Hands on Me" while "bathed in white light" and perform a backwards fall into the audience where he would then crowd surf. In certain cases, Gabriel would lose articles of clothing while crowd surfing. He would then return to the stage with new clothes and perform "Sledgehammer".

When determining the show's choreography, Gabriel took inspiration from some of the movements and gestures found in the 1975 book Bodily Communication, written by the UK social psychologist Michael Argyle. One such example was the outward palm gesture that he employed during "In Your Eyes". Music Week mentioned in the 4 July 1987 edition of the publication that Gabriel would be the using four Ibanez SDR1000+ effect units on the European leg of his tour.

== Recordings ==
A concert film for the tour, titled Live in Athens 1987, was released on DVD in 2013. Filmed at the Lycabettus Theatre on three of the five nights (5, 6 and 9 October 1987), the film was directed by Michael Chapman with Martin Scorsese serving as executive producer. A live album of the film was released in 2020. Previously, audio of the recording was issued on a 25th anniversary edition of So, restored and mixed by Ben Findlay. The film was sourced from over 150 reels of 35mm film and restored into high-definition. Much of the film was included on Gabriel's POV (1990) concert film and restored for physical release.

== Set list ==
These setlists are not representative of every show during the first leg of the tour. During Gabriel's show in Rochester, New York, "Big Time" was positioned in the set after "Don't Give Up". For other performances, including his tour stop in Buffalo, New York, "Big Time" instead preceded "Don't Give Up." For the same show, "I Don't Remember" was played after "Family Snapshot". At certain shows, "Not One of Us", "Solsbury Hill" and Wallflower" were also played. By 1987, "Solsbury Hill" and "Games Without Frontiers" were more consistently integrated into the setlist.

1986 leg

1. "San Jacinto"
2. "Red Rain"
3. "Shock the Monkey"
4. "Family Snapshot"
5. "I Have the Touch" (occasionally)
6. "The Family and the Fishing Net"
7. "No Self Control"
8. "Mercy Street"
9. "This is the Picture (Excellent Birds)"
10. "Big Time"
11. "Don't Give Up"
12. "Lay Your Hands on Me"
13. "Sledgehammer"
14. "Here Comes the Flood" (occasionally)

Encore:

1. "In Your Eyes"
2. "Biko"

1987 leg

1. "San Jacinto"
2. "Red Rain"
3. "Shock the Monkey"
4. "Family Snapshot"
5. "Games Without Frontiers"
6. "The Family and the Fishing Net"
7. "No Self Control"
8. "Mercy Street"
9. "This is the Picture (Excellent Birds)"
10. "Big Time"
11. "Don't Give Up"
12. "Solsbury Hill"
13. "Lay Your Hands on Me"
14. "Sledgehammer"
15. "Here Comes the Flood"

Encore:

1. "In Your Eyes"
2. "Biko"

Alterations

- For the first two shows in Athens, "This is the Picture (Excellent Birds)" was performed at the start of the concert.
- "Not One of Us" was occasionally performed at shows in the 1986 leg.
- "Intruder" was occasionally performed at shows in the 1987 leg.

== Tour dates ==
List of 1986 concerts, showing date, city, country, venue, tickets sold and number of available tickets
Date	City	Country	Venue
November 7, 1986	Rochester	United States	Rochester Community War Memorial
November 8, 1986	Pittsburgh	United States	Civic Arena
November 9, 1986	Syracuse	United States	Onondaga County War Memorial
November 11, 1986	Landover	United States	Capital Centre
November 12, 1986	New Haven	United States	New Haven Veterans Memorial Coliseum
November 14, 1986	Cincinnati	United States	Cincinnati Gardens
November 15, 1986	Champaign	United States	Assembly Hall
November 17, 1986	Detroit	United States	Joe Louis Arena
November 18, 1986	Cleveland	United States	Richfield Coliseum
November 19, 1986	Buffalo	United States	Alumni Arena
November 21, 1986	Worcester	United States	Centrum in Worcester
November 22, 1986	Worcester	United States	Centrum in Worcester
November 24, 1986	Ottawa	Canada	Ottawa Civic Centre
November 25, 1986	Montreal	Canada	Montreal Forum
November 26, 1986	Toronto	Canada	Maple Leaf Gardens
November 27, 1986	Toronto	Canada	Maple Leaf Gardens
November 29, 1986	Philadelphia	United States	Spectrum
November 30, 1986	Philadelphia	United States	Spectrum
December 1, 1986	New York City	United States	Madison Square Garden
December 2, 1986	New York City	United States	Madison Square Garden
December 4, 1986	Rosemont	United States	Rosemont Horizon
December 5, 1986	Rosemont	United States	Rosemont Horizon
December 7, 1986	Houston	United States	The Summit
December 8, 1986	Dallas	United States	Reunion Arena
December 9, 1986	Austin	United States	Frank Erwin Center
December 12, 1986	Oakland	United States	Oakland–Alameda County Coliseum Arena
December 13, 1986	Oakland	United States	Oakland–Alameda County Coliseum Arena
December 15, 1986	Inglewood	United States	The Forum
December 16, 1986	Inglewood	United States	The Forum
December 20, 1986 (Note: Performed as part of Japan Aid)	Tokyo	Japan	Meiji Jingu Stadium
December 21, 1986	Tokyo	Japan	Meiji Jingu Stadium

List of 1987 concerts, showing date, city, country, venue, tickets sold and number of available tickets
Date	City	Country	Venue
June 1, 1987	Clermont-Ferrand	France	Maison Des Sports
June 2, 1987	Bordeaux	France	Patinoire de Mériadeck
June 3, 1987	Nantes	France	Parc des Expositions de la Beaujoire
June 5, 1987	Paris	France	Palais Omnisports de Paris-Bercy
June 6, 1987	Paris	France	Palais Omnisports de Paris-Bercy
June 7, 1987	Paris	France	Palais Omnisports de Paris-Bercy
June 10, 1987	Milan	Italy	PalaTrussardi
June 12, 1987	Rome	Italy	Palazzo dello Sport
June 13, 1987	Rome	Italy	Palazzo dello Sport
June 15, 1987	Munich	Germany	Olympiahalle
June 16, 1987	Stuttgart	Germany	Hanns-Martin-Schleyer-Halle
June 17, 1987	Nuremberg	Germany	Frankenhalle
June 19, 1987	Cologne	Germany	Sporthalle
June 20, 1987	Hamburg	Germany	Alsterdorfer Sporthalle
June 21, 1987	Bremen	Germany	Stadthalle
June 23, 1987	Glasgow	Scotland	Scottish Exhibition and Conference Centre
June 25, 1987	London	England	Earls Court Exhibition Centre
June 26, 1987	London	England	Earls Court Exhibition Centre
June 27, 1987	London	England	Earls Court Exhibition Centre
June 28, 1987	London	England	Earls Court Exhibition Centre
June 30, 1987	Birmingham	England	NEC Arena
July 1, 1987	Birmingham	England	NEC Arena
July 2, 1987	Birmingham	England	NEC Arena
July 4, 1987 (Note: Part of Torhout-Werchter)	Torhout	Belgium	Rockweide
July 5, 1987	Werchter	Belgium	Werchter Festivalpark
July 10, 1987	Ottawa	Canada	Lansdowne Park
July 11, 1987	Toronto	Canada	CNE Grandstand
July 12, 1987	Montreal	Canada	Montreal Forum
July 13, 1987	Montreal	Canada	Montreal Forum
July 15, 1987	Mansfield	United States	Great Woods Center for the Performing Arts
July 16, 1987	Mansfield	United States	Great Woods Center for the Performing Arts
July 17, 1987	East Rutherford	United States	Brendan Byrne Arena
July 18, 1987	East Rutherford	United States	Brendan Byrne Arena
July 19, 1987	East Rutherford	United States	Brendan Byrne Arena
July 20, 1987	Philadelphia	United States	Spectrum
July 21, 1987	Philadelphia	United States	Spectrum
July 23, 1987	Clarkston	United States	Pine Knob Music Theatre
July 24, 1987	Cleveland	United States	Masonic Auditorium
July 25, 1987	Milwaukee	United States	Marcus Amphitheater
July 27, 1987	Cuyahoga Falls	United States	Blossom Music Center
July 28, 1987	Columbia	United States	Merriweather Post Pavilion
August 29, 1987	Copenhagen	Denmark	Hvidovre Stadium
August 30, 1987 (Note: Part of Kalvøyafestivalen)	Bærum	Norway	Kalvøya
September 1, 1987	Helsinki	Finland	Helsinki Ice Hall
September 3, 1987	Stockholm	Sweden	Johanneshovs Isstadion
September 6, 1987	Gothenburg	Sweden	Scandinavium
September 8, 1987	Rotterdam	Netherlands	Ahoy
September 9, 1987	Rotterdam	Netherlands	Ahoy
September 11, 1987	Berlin	Germany	Waldbuhne
September 12, 1987	Bochum	Germany	Ruhrstadion
September 13, 1987	Offenbach am Main	Germany	Stadion am Bieberer Berg
September 15, 1987	Budapest	Hungary	Hidegkuti Nándor Stadion
September 16, 1987	Vienna	Austria	Wiener Stadthalle
September 18, 1987	Verona	Italy	Arena di Verona
September 19, 1987	Locarno	Switzerland	Piazza Grande
September 21, 1987	Basel	Switzerland	St. Jakobshalle
September 22, 1987	Lausanne	Switzerland	CIG de Malley
September 23, 1987	Strasbourg	France	Stade de la Meinau
September 24, 1987	Lyon	France	Palais des Sports de Gerland
September 26, 1987	Toulouse	France	Palais des Sports
September 27, 1987	San Sebastián	Spain	Velódromo de Anoeta
September 28, 1987	Madrid	Spain	Palacio de Deportes de la Comunidad de Madrid
September 30, 1987	Barcelona	Spain	Palau dels Esports de Barcelona
October 5, 1987	Athens	Greece	Lycabettus Theatre
October 6, 1987	Athens	Greece	Lycabettus Theatre
October 7, 1987	Athens	Greece	Lycabettus Theatre
October 8, 1987	Athens	Greece	Lycabettus Theatre
October 9, 1987	Athens	Greece	Lycabettus Theatre

== Personnel ==
=== Musicians ===
- Peter Gabriel – vocals, keyboards
- David Rhodes – guitar and backing vocals
- Tony Levin – bass guitar, Chapman stick, synthesizer, backing vocals
- David Sancious – keyboards
- Manu Katché – drums

=== Tour crew ===
- Gail Colson – manager
- Billy Francis – road manager
- Carol Graham – wardrobe
- David Parry – accountant
- Jonathan Smeeton – lightning designer
- Clive Franks – sound engineer
