= Shaking the Tree (disambiguation) =

Shaking the Tree is a 1990 compilation album by rock musician Peter Gabriel, and the name of a song from that album.

Shaking the Tree may also refer to:

- Shaking the Tree (film), a 1990 comedy-drama by Duane Clark
- "Shaking the Tree" (Powers), a 2016 episode of the television series Powers
- Shaking the Tree (song), 1989 song by Youssou N'Dour and Peter Gabriel
