= Shaking the Tree: Sixteen Golden Greats =

Greatest hits album by Peter Gabriel
- Released: 19 November 1990
- Recorded: 1976–1990
- Genre: Art rock
- Length: 77:05
- Label: Geffen/Virgin
- Producers: Bob Ezrin; Steve Lillywhite; Peter Gabriel; Daniel Lanois

Peter Gabriel chronology
Passion: Music for The Last Temptation of Christ (1989)	Shaking the Tree: Sixteen Golden Greats (1990)	Us (1992)

Singles from Shaking the Tree
- 1. "Solsbury Hill" Released: 3 December 1990

Professional ratings
Review scores
Source	Rating
AllMusic	4/5 stars
Entertainment Weekly	A
New Musical Express	7/10
The Rolling Stone Album Guide	4.5/5 stars

Shaking the Tree: Sixteen Golden Greats is a compilation album by the English rock musician Peter Gabriel. It was released in 1990 as Gabriel's first career retrospective, including songs from his first solo album Peter Gabriel (I or Car) (1977), through Passion: Music for The Last Temptation of Christ (1989). It was remastered with most of Gabriel's catalogue in 2002. The vinyl version of the album is called Shaking the Tree: Twelve Golden Greats.

== Track selection ==
The tracks are creatively re-ordered, ignoring chronology. Some of the tracks were different from the album versions. New parts were recorded for several tracks in Gabriel's Real World Studios. Most songs are edited for time, either as radio, single, or video edit versions. "Shakin' the Tree"—a track from Youssou N'Dour's 1989 album The Lion—is a 1990 version featuring new vocals from Gabriel (and slightly revised title). "I Have the Touch" is listed as a 1983 remix, although it is actually the 1985 remix which appeared on the "Sledgehammer" single. (The 1985 remix is similar to the 1983 remix, which appeared as the B-side of the "Walk Through the Fire" single, but is edited down to 3m 45s)

"Here Comes the Flood" is a new recording from 1990. This version is a piano and voice arrangement, that is far simpler than the highly produced version on Peter Gabriel (1977). Its sparseness is closer to the version Gabriel recorded with Robert Fripp on Fripp's Exposure (1979). In interviews, Gabriel has said that he preferred the 1979 version, which he also chose to overdub in German as the flipside of the single "Biko" released before Ein deutsches Album (1980).

Although this album highlights songs from Peter Gabriel's earlier albums, tracks from Peter Gabriel (II, or Scratch) and the soundtrack to the film Birdy are not included. "In Your Eyes" is missing from the compilation. Say Anything..., in which it was played in a prominent scene, had been released the year before. Although this made "In Your Eyes" perhaps the most well known Peter Gabriel song aside from "Sledgehammer" in the U.S., it was not released as a single in Peter Gabriel's UK homeland. "In Your Eyes" was therefore omitted from the album in favour of five of the other eight tracks from So – four other hits and the album track "Mercy Street".

== Release ==
For the album packaging, Gabriel decided to forgo longboxes in favour of a jewel box as a means of reducing waste. Robert Smith, who served as the head of marketing for Geffen Records, defended Gabriel's decision to exclusively release the album in a jewel box, saying that "it is not a clause in his contract. It is Peter Gabriel's personal wishes, and we are respecting those wishes." Some record store outlets including Show Industries, Kemp Mill, and Music Plus refused to carry the album in their stores because of Gabriel's choice of packaging.

Music & Media called Shaking The Tree a "quality compilation" with "intelligent, melodic pop songs, which, in all their diversity, possess the unmistakable Gabriel touch of genius". Cashbox thought that the compilation served as "an excellent introduction" to Gabriel's solo discography.

== Track listing ==
Tracks marked with (*) do not appear on the vinyl release of the album.

All tracks are written by Peter Gabriel, except "Shaking the Tree", co-written with Youssou N'Dour.

No.	Title	Originally from	Length
1.	"Solsbury Hill"	Peter Gabriel 1 (Car), 1977	4:20
2.	"I Don't Remember" (Edited version)	Peter Gabriel 3 (Melt), 1980	3:48
3.	"Sledgehammer" (Single edit)	So, 1986	4:52
4.	"Family Snapshot"	Peter Gabriel 3 (Melt), 1980	4:25
5.	"Mercy Street" (Edited version)	So, 1986	4:43
6.	"Shaking the Tree" (Duet with Youssou N'Dour; 1990 remix)	The Lion, 1989	6:24
7.	"Don't Give Up" (Duet with Kate Bush; Edited version)	So, 1986	5:55
8.	"San Jacinto" (*)	Peter Gabriel 4 (Security), 1982	6:40
9.	"Here Comes the Flood" (1990 re-recording)	New recording – original version on Peter Gabriel 1 (Car), 1977	4:31
10.	"Red Rain" (*)	So, 1986	5:35
11.	"Games Without Frontiers" (Edited version)	Peter Gabriel 3 (Melt), 1980	3:57
12.	"Shock the Monkey" (Radio edit)	Peter Gabriel 4 (Security), 1982	3:57
13.	"I Have the Touch" ('85 remix, mislabelled as 1983 remix) (*)	Peter Gabriel 4 (Security), 1982	3:44
14.	"Big Time"	So, 1986	4:26
15.	"Zaar" (Edited version) (*)	Passion: Music for The Last Temptation of Christ, 1989	2:58
16.	"Biko" (Edited version)	Peter Gabriel 3 (Melt), 1980	6:54
Total length:			77:05

== Personnel ==
"Solsbury Hill"

- Bob Ezrin – production
- Larry Fast – synthesizer
- Robert Fripp – guitar
- Peter Gabriel – vocals
- Steve Hunter – guitar
- Tony Levin – bass guitar
- Alan Schwartzberg – drums

"I Don't Remember" (Edited version)

- Larry Fast – processing
- Robert Fripp – guitar
- Peter Gabriel – piano, synthesizer, vocals, and production
- Tony Levin – Chapman Stick
- Jerry Marrotta – drums
- David Rhodes – guitar
- Peter Walsh – production

"Sledgehammer" (Single edit)

- P.P. Arnold – backing vocals
- Peter Gabriel – Fairlight CMI, Prophet, piano, vocals, production
- Carol Gordon – backing vocals
- Manu Katche – drums
- Wayne Jackson – trumpet
- Daniel Lanois – production
- Tony Levin – bass guitar
- Dee Lewis – backing vocals
- Don Mikkelsen – trombone
- David Rhodes – guitar
- Mark Rivera – saxophone

"Family Snapshot"

- Larry Fast – synthesizer
- Phil Collins – snare drum
- Peter Gabriel – piano, vocals
- John Giblin – bass guitar
- Dave Gregory – guitar
- Steve Lillywhite – production
- Jerry Marrotta – drums
- Dick Morrissey – saxophone
- David Rhodes – guitar

"Mercy Street" (Edited version)

- Djalma Correa – surdu, congas, and triangle
- Peter Gabriel – Fairlight CMI, Prophet, piano, CS80, vocals, and production
- Larry Klein – bass guitar
- Daniel Lanois – production
- Mark Rivera – processed saxophone

"Shaking the Tree" (1990 remix)

- George Acogny – Fairlight CMI percussion
- Roger Bolton – Fairlight CMI percussion and sequencing
- Simon Clark – organ, piano, keyboard bass, and synthesizer
- Habib Faye – bass guitar, guitar
- Peter Gabriel – vocals and re-recorded vocals
- Manu Katche – drums
- Youssou N'Dour – vocals
- David Rhodes – acoustic and electric guitar

"Don't Give Up" (Edited version)

- Peter Gabriel – chant, vocals, CMI, Prophet, piano, production
- Kate Bush – vocals, chant
- David Rhodes – guitar
- Tony Levin – bass guitar
- Simon Clark – chorus CS 80
- Richard Tee – piano
- Daniel Lanois – production

"San Jacinto"

- Peter Gabriel – vocals, production
- David Lord – production

"Here Comes the Flood" (1990 re-recording)

- Peter Gabriel – piano, vocals, and production

"Red Rain"

- Peter Gabriel – vocals, production
- Daniel Lanois – production

"Games Without Frontiers" (Single edit)

- Steve Lillywhite – production
- Kate Bush – background vocals

"Shock the Monkey" (Radio edit)

- Peter Gabriel – vocals, production
- David Lord – production

"I Have the Touch" (1983 remix)

- Peter Gabriel – keyboards, vocals, and production
- David Lord – production
- Simon Phillips – drums
- James Guthrie – remix engineer

"Big Time"

- Peter Gabriel – vocals, production
- Daniel Lanois – production

"Zaar" (Edited version)

- Peter Gabriel – production

"Biko" (Edited version)

- Steve Lillywhite – production

Additional

- Alexander Knaust – styling and photography assistance
- Robert Mapplethorpe – photography
- Mouat Nomad, London – design

== Charts ==
=== Weekly charts ===
Chart performance for Shaking the Tree: Sixteen Golden Greats
Chart (1990–2005)	Peak position
Australian Albums (ARIA)	41
Austrian Albums (Ö3 Austria)	26
Canada Top Albums/CDs (RPM)	15
Dutch Albums (Album Top 100)	14
Dutch Albums (Midprice Top 50)	50
European Albums (IFPI)	8
Finnish Albums (Suomen virallinen lista)	13
French Albums (IFOP)	12
German Albums (Offizielle Top 100)	12
Greek Albums (IFPI)	2
Japanese Albums (Oricon)	10
New Zealand Albums (RMNZ)	18
Scottish Albums (Official Charts)	68
Spanish Albums (AFYVE)	11
Swedish Albums (Sverigetopplistan)	10
Swiss Albums (Schweizer Hitparade)	27
UK Albums (Official Charts)	11
UK Physical Albums (OCC)	61
US Billboard 200	48
US Top Album Sales (Billboard)	178
US Top Catalog Albums (Billboard)	33
US Top Current Album Sales (Billboard)	48

=== Year-end charts ===
Year-end chart performance for Shaking the Tree: Sixteen Golden Greats
Chart (1990)	Position
Japanese Albums (Oricon)	75
Spanish Albums (AFYVE)	87
Swiss Albums (Schweizer Hitparade)	174
UK Albums (OCC)	121

Chart (1991)	Position
Austrian Albums (Ö3 Austria)	167
Canada Top Albums/CDs (RPM)	68
German Albums (Offizielle Top 100)	58
Swiss Albums (Schweizer Hitparade)	131
UK Albums (OCC)	134

== Certifications ==
Sales certifications for Shaking the Tree: Sixteen Golden Greats
Region	Certification	Certified units/sales
Australia (ARIA)	Gold	35,000^{^}
Canada (Music Canada)	Platinum	100,000^{^}
France (SNEP)	2× Gold	200,000^{*}
Germany (BVMI)	Platinum	500,000^{^}
Italy (FIMI)	Gold	
Japan (RIAJ)	Platinum	200,000^{^}
Netherlands (NVPI)	Gold	50,000^{^}
New Zealand (RMNZ)	Gold	7,500^{^}
Spain (Promusicae)	Gold	50,000^{^}
Switzerland (IFPI Switzerland)	Gold	25,000^{^}
United Kingdom (BPI)	2× Platinum	600,000^{^}
United States (RIAA)	2× Platinum	2,000,000^{^}
^{*} Sales figures based on certification alone.^{^} Shipments figures based on certification alone.
