= Zaar (song) =

Song by Peter Gabriel

from the album Passion
- Released: 1989
- Recorded: February 1988 – March 1989
- Studio: Real World (Wiltshire)
- Length: 4:53
- Label: Real World
- Songwriter: Peter Gabriel
- Producer: Peter Gabriel

"Zaar" is a song written and recorded by the English musician Peter Gabriel. He created the composition for The Last Temptation of Christ, a film directed by Martin Scorsese and released in 1988. Following the film's release, Gabriel reworked the material from the movie and included the "Zaar" on his Passion album the following year. Stefan Roloff directed the music video for the song.

== Background ==
According to the liner notes for Passion, "Zaar" was "written around a traditional Egyptian rhythm which is performed to fend off evil spirits." Gabriel recalled that he was drawn to the Egyptian rhythm and noted that the original tempo was faster than what appeared on the recording found on Passion. The raw and unedited rhythm track, which Gabriel described as "driving", was brought down to a little over half the original speed, which he said resulted in a "dark and moodier spine on which to base the track". The percussion on the song was played by the Egyptian musician Hossam Ramzy, who played numerous instruments including the duf. The percussion was augmented by parts played on a bowed string kemenche by Mahmoud Tabrizi-Zadeh, double violin from L. Shankar, Nathan East on bass, some processed guitar from David Rhodes, and keyboard samples triggered by Gabriel on an Audioframe and Akai S900.

Gabriel labeled "Zaar" as one of his favourite songs on the album and said that it "starts in one texture and ends up very different. That was sort of a natural journey." An edit of the song appeared on Gabriel's 1990 Shaking the Tree: Sixteen Golden Greats compilation album and a 5.1 surround sound mix was created for his Play: The Videos DVD compilation. Some of the percussion parts on "Zaar", including the duf and surdo tracks, were later used on Gabriel's song "Digging in the Dirt" from his 1992 Us album.

The word Zār carries different cultural connotations across the Persian Gulf. It relates to, among other things, a spirit capable of possessing individuals, the afflictions believed to be attributed to these spirits, and the rituals associated with the treatment of these afflictions. The term "zār" is identified as a culture-bound syndrome in the Diagnostic and Statistical Manual of Mental Disorders.

== Music video ==
A music video was directed by the German artist Stefan Roloff. It features visuals of animated paintings depicting boats, warships, fruits, tables, and a couple operating an automobile. The footage used in the music video originated from a "moving painting" Roloff created in 1986 titled Lunch, which took three weeks for Roloff to paint. He said that the music video "follows the changes of a human relationship." In a 2007 interview with Record World, Gabriel cited the music video for "Zaar" as one of his favorites.

== Critical reception ==
Musician magazine wrote that "the compelling "Zaar" is one example of Gabriel throwing himself into expressing the dark, dangerous aspects of Christ's story with more gusto than he has the sacred, devotional ones". Sound on Sound characterised the song as a "sinewy dancing rhythmic tune, somewhat like an Egyptian sun dance." They also noted the "thundery opening", the "tactile use of ethnic percussion", and the guitar work of David Rhodes, which in their opinion culminated in "one of the album's best moments". Rolling Stone believed that "Zaar" was the most effective showcase of the "multicultural approach" found on Passion and served as "the album's majestic stand-alone moment".

== Personnel ==
- Hossam Ramzy – tambourines, dufs, tabla, finger cymbals, triangle
- Peter Gabriel – surdo, additional percussion, Audioframe, Akai S900, voice
- Nathan East – bass
- David Rhodes – guitar
- Mahmoud Tabrizi Zadeh – kemenche
- L. Shankar – double violin
