= Passion (Peter Gabriel album) =

1989 soundtrack album by Peter Gabriel

Soundtrack album / Studio album by Peter Gabriel
- Released: 5 June 1989
- Recorded: February 1988 – March 1989
- Studios: Real World, Box, UK
- Genres: World; new-age; worldbeat
- Length: 67:03
- Labels: Geffen (US & Canada); Virgin; Real World
- Producer: Peter Gabriel

Peter Gabriel chronology
So (1986)	Passion (1989)	Shaking the Tree (1990)

Passion: Music for The Last Temptation of Christ, a film by Martin Scorsese is an album released in 1989 by the English singer-songwriter Peter Gabriel. It was the first Peter Gabriel album to be released on Real World Records, Gabriel's second soundtrack, and his eighth album overall.

Passion was originally composed as the soundtrack album for Martin Scorsese's film The Last Temptation of Christ (1988), but Gabriel spent several months after the film's release further developing the music, finally releasing it as a full-fledged album instead of a movie soundtrack. The album was released in June 1989 (almost a year after the theatrical release of The Last Temptation of Christ in August 1988) as a vinyl double album and a 1-disc CD.

Later in the year, a companion album was released, Passion – Sources, featuring additional songs on which Gabriel does not perform. Gabriel described this album as "a selection of some of the traditional music, sources of inspiration, and location recordings." Although no singles were released from the album, an animated promotional video for "Zaar" was released in 1988, directed by Stefan Roloff, using footage from his earlier short film Lunch.

Passion is seen as a landmark in the popularisation of world music, and won a Grammy Award for Best New Age Album in 1990. It was remastered with most of Gabriel's catalogue in 2002.

== Overview ==
Peter Gabriel's first film soundtrack, Birdy (1985), comprised original material and instrumental rearrangements of songs from Gabriel's third and fourth albums. Passion, on the other hand, contained music entirely original to Gabriel's catalogue. Martin Scorsese, the director of The Last Temptation of Christ, later recalled,

I began listening to Peter’s music back in 1982-83 and I especially liked "Rhythm of the Heat" with its drums, and then "I Go Swimming" where the lyrics start quite ordinarily before taking off to reach a spiritual level – especially in the live version... I said I’d be interested in having him do the music for The Last Temptation of Christ because, for me, the rhythms he uses reflect the primitive and his vocals reflect the sublime – it’s as if the spirit and the flesh are together right there... Of course, he had to do it as a labour of love because there was hardly any money in it. Normally, he says, it takes two years to do 40 minutes of music, and this was two hours and 40 minutes, which he did in three months!

To record the soundtrack for The Last Temptation of Christ, Gabriel relied on WOMAD, an organization he founded, to bring together musicians from the Middle East, Africa, Europe and South Asia. He worked with them to create music meant to enhance the mood of the film, but he also added a modern ambient musical touch to the original pieces, producing a musical work that has influenced many musicians. Passion introduced many listeners to such artists as Nusrat Fateh Ali Khan, Youssou N'Dour, L. Shankar, and Baaba Maal. N'Dour and Shankar had provided contributions to Gabriel's previous album, So (1986); Passion also features other musicians who had worked with Gabriel before, including David Rhodes, Manny Elias, David Bottrill, and Manu Katché.

The delay of the album's release was due to Gabriel's schedule with the Human Rights Now! tour for Amnesty International in 1988 and to the truncated production time allotted by Universal Pictures for the soundtrack: Universal cut the recording time for Gabriel from 10 to three weeks, leaving Gabriel very little time to complete all the pieces he wanted. After the film's mix was finished, Gabriel had unfinished ideas he wanted to develop and took extra time to complete the album. Gabriel took a further four months to complete Passion, building the pieces and developing the musical textures as part of his stated desire for the album to stand as a piece of work in its own right.

The cover art for the album, Drawing study for Self Image II (1987), is a mixed media composition by the artist Julian Grater. When re-released in 2002, the album was titled Passion: Music for The Last Temptation of Christ due to "legal barriers" according to Gabriel in its liner notes. Passion was among the first five albums released by Real World Records.

Reflecting on the album in 2007, Gabriel told Uncut that "Passion may be the best one I've ever done. I wasn't working with a producer, and as I was serving someone else's vision, that gave me freedom in a strange way. Some of the 'Sledgehammer' fans wouldn't be into it – a bit too 'out there' for them."

== Recording ==
Several tracks on the album originated from improvised seven-minute sketches from which Gabriel would pick the sections that he felt best aligned with the film and later layer in additional instrumentation. He explained his compositional approach for Passion with Keyboard magazine, saying that "seven minutes is the time I start getting bored. Obviously, a lot of ideas don't sustain that long - but it's good for me to give myself that much room. I tend to want to over-record at first."

David Bottrill assisted with the creation of some drones, which he achieved by overdubbing various sound sources onto a 24-track tape machine and using the freeze function on a Quantec Room Simulator to create sustained chords. Bottrill used various sound sources to create these chords, including a Prophet-5, Fairlight CMI, a Vox bass guitar, Fender Stratocaster, and Gabriel's voice.

I would build drones on all 24 tracks, all in the same key, and then took that 24‑track and used it as it was, or used varispeed to tune the tape to the key desired. Then, using all the 24 faders, I would bus the output of those tracks to another tape machine and 'play' the sound, bringing up each one separately and blend different tones to build a living drone for around 10 minutes or so. We built long pieces because we didn’t know how long the cues would be, so better to be too long than too short. I then had this stereo track of this moving drone that gave you this whole atmosphere for the entire length of the track.

— David Bottrill

"With This Love" began with a vocal melody developed by Gabriel. He then worked with David Sancious, who built an arrangement around the song and suggested some harmonies to accompany it. "With This Love", which Gabriel described as "church-like", was originally intended for a scene where the devil, disguised as a little girl, removes Jesus from a cross and kisses his bleeding body. However, Scorsese decided against using the song for this scene. Gabriel attributed this decision to his belief that the scene would have been "perhaps too powerful" and "potentially too explosive", but still felt that it would have been a "very strong marriage of music and image."

== Reception ==
Professional ratings
Review scores
Source	Rating
AllMusic	4/5 stars
Chicago Tribune	3/4 stars
Entertainment Weekly	B+
Los Angeles Times	3/5 stars
NME	6/10
The Philadelphia Inquirer	4/4 stars
Q	4/5 stars
Record Collector	5/5 stars
Rolling Stone	4/5 stars
The Rolling Stone Album Guide	3.5/5 stars

Upon its release, Passion received generally positive reviews from critics. Reviewing Passion for Rolling Stone, Jimmy Guterman wrote that "Gabriel’s journey is just as deeply felt as Scorsese's... [Passion] stands as a testament to the breadth of Gabriel's interests, as well as his talents." Noting songs which "successfully accommodate third-world melodies and cross-rhythms in a Western pop context," Guterman said that, "Passion is stirring, stunning stuff: You won't hear it on the radio like you heard 'Sledgehammer' or 'Big Time', but if you do search it out, you'll find a piece of work by an artist who remains idiosyncratic without being obtuse."

Reviewing the album for the Chicago Tribune, Chris Heim called it a "surprisingly accessible and successful instrumental album where "traditional percussion, string and wind instruments blend seamlessly with modern synthesizer to create a compelling work that suggests the mystery, agony and sublime release at the core of Christ's passion." Cashbox referred to Passion as an "Afro/Middle-Eastern fruit salad". Billboard described the album as "a 21-song instrumental extravaganza" that was "innovative, intense, and evocative". Writing for The Los Angeles Times, Chris Willman believed that the album was at its strongest when Gabriel incorporated "his own unique sense of melodic writing" into the album rather than completely appropriat[ing] foreign styles and scales, travelogue-style".

== Track listing ==
All tracks are written by Peter Gabriel except where noted.

Side one
No.	Title	Length
1.	"The Feeling Begins"	4:00
2.	"Gethsemane"	1:26
3.	"Of These, Hope"	3:55
4.	"Lazarus Raised"	1:26
5.	"Of These, Hope – Reprise"	2:44
6.	"In Doubt"	1:33
7.	"A Different Drum"	4:40

Side two
No.	Title	Writer(s)	Length
8.	"Zaar"		4:53
9.	"Troubled"		2:55
10.	"Open"	Gabriel, L. Shankar	3:27
11.	"Before Night Falls"		2:18
12.	"With This Love"		3:40

Side three
No.	Title	Writer(s)	Length
13.	"Sandstorm"		3:02
14.	"Stigmata"	Gabriel, Mahmoud Tabrizi Zadeh	2:28
15.	"Passion"		7:39
16.	"With This Love (Choir)"		3:20

Side four
No.	Title	Length
17.	"Wall of Breath"	2:29
18.	"The Promise of Shadows"	2:13
19.	"Disturbed"	3:35
20.	"It Is Accomplished"	2:55
21.	"Bread and Wine"	2:21

== Personnel ==
1. "The Feeling Begins"
  - Manny Elias – octabans, surdo, skins
  - Hossam Ramzy – finger cymbals, tabla, dufs
  - Peter Gabriel – synthesizers, shakers, skins, surdo
  - David Bottrill – drone mix
  - David Rhodes – guitar
  - L. Shankar – double violin
  - Vatche Housepian – Armenian duduk
  - Antranik Askarian – Armenian duduk
  The duduk is playing an Armenian melody, "The Wind Subsides". (Armenian duduks recorded for Ocora Records under the direction of Robert Ataian.)
2. "Gethsemane"
  - Peter Gabriel – flute samples, flute, voices
3. "Of These, Hope"
  - Massamba Diop – talking drum
  - Peter Gabriel – bass, percussion, flute whistle, Prophet 5
  - L. Shankar – double violin
  - David Rhodes – guitar
  - Mustafa Abdel Aziz – arghul drone
4. "Lazarus Raised"
  - (Players unknown) – Kurdish duduk & tanbur
  - David Rhodes – guitars
  - Peter Gabriel – piano, Akai S900
  This piece incorporates a traditional melody from Kurdistan telling of the unhappy love of a young girl for Bave Seyro, a legendary warrior. (Kurdish duduks are from UNESCO Collection – A Musical Anthology of the Orient, general editor Alain Danielou for Musicaphon Records.)
5. "Of These, Hope – Reprise"
  - Massamba Diop – talking drum
  - Peter Gabriel – bass, percussion, flute whistle, Prophet 5
  - L. Shankar – double violin
  - David Rhodes – guitar
  - Mustafa Abdel Aziz – arghul drone
  - Baaba Maal – vocals
  - Fatala – additional percussion
6. "In Doubt"
  - Peter Gabriel – Audioframe, Fairlight samples, vocals
  - Mahmoud Tabrizi Zadeh – kementché
7. "A Different Drum"
  - Doudou N'Diaye Rose – percussion loop (four bars)
  - Fatala – percussion loop (three bars)
  - Peter Gabriel – surdo, percussion, Audioframe, Prophet 5, voice
  - L. Shankar – double violin
  - Youssou N'Dour – voice
  - David Sancious – backing vocals
8. "Zaar"
  - Hossam Ramzy – tambourines, dufs, tabla, finger cymbals, triangle
  - Peter Gabriel – surdo, additional percussion, Audioframe, Akai S900, voice
  - Nathan East – bass
  - David Rhodes – guitar
  - Mahmoud Tabrizi Zadeh – kementché
  - L. Shankar – double violin
9. "Troubled"
  - Bill Cobham – drums, percussion
  - Hossam Ramzy – finger cymbals
  - Peter Gabriel – percussion, Fairlight, Emulator, backing vocals
  - David Sancious – backing vocals
10. "Open"
  - Peter Gabriel – Prophet 5, Akai S900, vocals
  - L. Shankar – double violin, vocals
11. "Before Night Falls"
  - Hossam Ramzy – finger cymbals, tabla, dufs
  - Kudsi Erguner – ney flute
  - L. Shankar – double violin
  The Ney flute is playing a traditional Armenian melody.
12. "With This Love"
  - Robin Canter – oboe, cor Anglais
  - L. Shankar – double violin
  - David Sancious – Akai S900, synthesizer arrangement
  - Peter Gabriel – Audioframe, Fairlight, piano, Prophet 5, synthesizer arrangement
13. "Sandstorm"
  - Location Recording – Moroccan percussion & vocals
  - Hossam Ramzy – surdo, tabla, tambourine dufs, mazhar
  - Manu Katché – additional percussion
  - Mahmoud Tabrizi Zadeh – kementché
  - L. Shankar – double violin
  - Peter Gabriel – Fairlight
14. "Stigmata"
  - Mahmoud Tabrizi Zadeh – kementché
  - Peter Gabriel – Prophet 5, voice
  Based on an improvisation by Mahmoud and Peter Gabriel.
15. "Passion"
  - Djalma Corrêa – Brazilian percussion
  - Jon Hassell – trumpet
  - Peter Gabriel – Prophet 5, Akai S900, Fairlight, voice
  - Nusrat Fateh Ali Khan – Qawwali voice
  - L. Shankar – double violin
  - Youssou N'Dour – voice
  - Julian Wilkins – choirboy
16. "With This Love (Choir)"
  - Robin Canter – cor anglais
  - Richard Evans – choir recording
17. "Wall of Breath"
  - Kudsi Erguner – Turkish ney flute
  - L. Shankar – double violin
  - Musicians Du Nil – arghul
  - David Rhodes – Ebow guitar
  - Peter Gabriel – synthesizers
18. "The Promise of Shadows"
  - Bill Cobham – drum kit
  - David Bottrill – lead tambourine
  - Peter Gabriel – Emulator, Prophet 5, Audioframe, additional percussion
  - David Rhodes – guitar
19. "Disturbed"
  - Hossam Ramzy – surdo, tabla
  - Mustafa Abdel Aziz – percussion loop
  - Said Mohammad Aly – percussion loop
  - Fatala – African percussion
  - L. Shankar – double violin
  - Peter Gabriel – Fairlight, Prophet 5
20. "It Is Accomplished"
  - Bill Cobham – drums, tambourine
  - David Bottrill – tambourine 2, distorted slide
  - Nathan East – bass
  - Mustafa Abdel Aziz – arghul drone
  - David Sancious – Hammond organ
  - David Rhodes – Steinberger guitar
  - Peter Gabriel – doholla, additional percussion, Roland D-50, piano, Prophet 5, voice
21. "Bread and Wine"
  - Peter Gabriel – contrabass, Prophet 5, voice
  - David Rhodes – EBow guitar
  - Richard Evans – tin whistle
  - L. Shankar – double violin

== Charts ==
Chart (1989)	Peak position
Canada Top Albums/CDs (RPM)	62
Dutch Albums (Album Top 100)	59
European Albums (Music & Media)	51
Finnish Albums (The Official Finnish Charts)	38
German Albums (Offizielle Top 100)	30
Swedish Albums (Sverigetopplistan)	34
UK Albums (Official Charts)	29
US Billboard 200	60

== Certifications ==
Region	Certification	Certified units/sales
United States (RIAA)	Gold	500,000^{^}
^{^} Shipments figures based on certification alone.
