= Lay Your Hands on Me (Peter Gabriel song) =

Song by Peter Gabriel

from the album Peter Gabriel
- Released: 1982
- Studio: Ashcombe House (Swainswick, Somerset, England)
- Length: 6:03
- Label: Charisma; Geffen
- Songwriter: Peter Gabriel
- Producers: Peter Gabriel; David Lord

"Lay Your Hands on Me" is a song written and recorded by English musician Peter Gabriel. It is the sixth track on Gabriel's fourth studio album, Peter Gabriel, which was released in 1982. When performed live, Gabriel would fall into the crowd near the conclusion of the song and crowdsurf, with such instances occurring during his 1982 tour promoting his fourth studio album and the 1986–1987 This Way Up Tour.

== Background ==
Gabriel said that he wrote "Lay Your Hands on Me" about "trust, healing and sacrifice". He felt music critics misinterpreted the message about him being a messiah figure akin to Jesus, an assessment he disagreed with. The working title for "Lay Your Hands on Me" was "93", which derived from the name of a pattern preset found on a Linn LM-1.

The Fairlight CMI was responsible for some of the textures found throughout the track, including the sounds of scraped ceramic tile from a screwdriver and a synth bass tone archived from a sampled nylon acoustic guitar that was played several octaves below its usual range. The remaining instrumentation for the verses consist of a drum machine pattern from the Linn LM-1, and triggered hand claps, and synthesiser chords. The synth pads were achieved through the Prophet 5, which was treated with audio effects such as echo from outboard gear. For the verses, Gabriel said that the lyrics possessed "fairly dry, urban images" that were juxtaposed with "the screaming for the hands to be laid on in the choruses."

After two verses and bridges, the song segues into the pre-chorus, which layers in bass and additional percussion before reverting back to sparser instrumentation for verse 3. This verse substitutes the triggered hand claps with gated reverb drum fills, which is accompanied with lyrics about thornless roses and fat men playing with garden hoses. Following the repeat of the pre-chorus and chorus, a series of gated-drum fills lead into the final part of the song, which features fuller instrumentation of brass-synth drones, guitar chords, and extra percussion. To achieve what Larry Fast described as the "massive drum sound" during the final portion of the song, Jerry Marotta double tracked his part against the original drum track he recorded.

== Live performances ==
"Lay Your Hands On Me" made its live debut at the 1982 World of Music, Arts and Dance festival, which was documented on Gabriel's Live at WOMAD 1982 album released in 2025. During the early live renditions of the song, Gabriel would interact with the audience during the ending of the song by leaving the stage and walking through the aisles. For later performances, he would instead step on the side of the stage and fall into the audience and crowd surf through parts of the venue. During his first experiments with falling into the audience, Gabriel would dive face down, although he later changed this into a trust fall, with Gabriel explaining that "falling backwards is a real show of faith".

I feel I am trying to gradually involve the audience emotionally with what we are doing with the music. I feel it's an offering of trust to the audience. Clearly it is a dramatic moment which is contrived, in a way; I am not denying that. But I think the effect is strong because really what an artist is trying to do is engage the listener in what they are doing and get them to become part of the experience and not separated from it.

Gabriel performed the song for his This Way Up Tour in 1986–d1987, where he would again perform a trust fall into the audience. During Gabriel's performance at the Civic Arena in Pittsburgh, Pennsylvania, Scott Mervis reported in his concert review that audience members had ripped off Gabriel's shirt, requiring him to put on a new one onstage once security guards "wrenched him free". A performance of "Lay Your Hands on Me", with footage of Gabriel crowd surfing, was included on Live in Athens 1987.

When asked in a 1993 interview with Guitarist magazine about the most challenging Peter Gabriel song to play live, David Rhodes cited "Lay Your Hands on Me". He said that it "kind of nearly falls apart, and there's something quite exciting about that song; it's so on the edge that you feel it's going to decay at any moment." He expressed his belief that it was "not a difficult thing to play, but it always feels as if it's going to slip away."

== Critical reception ==
Writing for The Boston Phoenix, Howard Hampton characterised "Lay Your Hands on Me" as being about a "man a rope finding salvation in primitive faith". Adam Sweeting of Melody Maker called "Lay Your Hands on Me" "one of the album's centerpieces". Writing for New Musical Express, Gavin Martin cited "Lay Your Hands on Me" as a "blustering" song that was among a group of tracks built around an "endless barrage of stilted electronic devices", believing that they were "feebly constructed dire attempts to produce dynamics and atmospherics." In a review for Sounds magazine, Sandy Robertson characterised Gabriel's vocal delivery on the song as a "talkalong", with the lyrics evoking an "urban playground of perfect stainless steel nothingness" amid "bursts of drums".

== Personnel ==
- Peter Gabriel – lead and backing vocals, Fairlight CMI, Prophet-5, Linn LM-1
- David Lord – Fairlight CMI
- David Rhodes – guitars, backing vocals
- Tony Levin – fretted and fretless basses
- Jerry Marotta – drums, percussion
- Morris Pert – timbales
- Peter Hammill – backing vocals
