= Senzeni Na? =

Song
- Language: Xhosa
- Genre: Folk music

"Senzeni Na?" (also spelled Senzenina, English: What Have We Done?) is a South African anti‐apartheid folk song. It is a Xhosa struggle song, and is commonly sung at funerals, demonstrations and in churches. Activist Duma Ndlovu compared the influence of "Senzeni Na?" to that of the American protest song, "We Shall Overcome." This seems all the less surprising as Pete Seeger already included an adaptation of Senzeni Na in his repertoire in the 50s and 60s of the last century.

The song has been around at least since the 1950s, and it reached the height of its popularity during the 1980s. The origins of the song are unclear. Zimbabwean poet Albert Nyathi wrote a song by the same title, "Senzeni Na?" on the day that activist Chris Hani died.

The song was among several songs of a more mournful nature that became popular among anti-apartheid activists in the 1960s. The song repeats the line "What have we done" a number of times, which musician Sibongile Khumalo has described as giving the listener a sense of desolation.

== Lyrics ==
There does not seem to be one universally agreed on set of lyrics. Below are two versions, the bottom one being the more aggressive of the two:

IsiXhosa original Senzeni na? Sono sethu, ubumnyama? Sono sethu yinyaniso? Sibulawayo Mayibuye i Africa	English translation What have we done? Our sin is that we are black? Our sin is the truth They are killing us Let Africa return

IsiXhosa original Senzeni na senzeni na Senzeni na senzeni na Senzeni na senzeni na Senzeni na kulomhlaba? Amabhunu azizinja Amabhunu azizinja Amabhunu azizinja Amabhunu azizinja Kuyisono 'kubamnyama Kuyisono 'kubamnyama Kuyisono 'kubamnyama Kuyisono kulelizwe	English translation What have we done, what have we done? What have we done, what have we done? What have we done, what have we done? What have we done in this country (world)? Boers are dogs Boers are dogs Boers are dogs Boers are dogs It's a sin to be black It's a sin to be black It's a sin to be black It's a sin in this country (world)

== Appearances in the Western world ==
While best known in South Africa, "Senzeni Na?" has gained some popularity overseas. The song was sung at the funeral scene in the anti‐apartheid film The Power of One as well as during the opening credits of the film In My Country, and a recording of the song as sung at the funeral of Steve Biko can be heard at the end of the album version of "Biko" by Peter Gabriel. It was also sung by Kenneth Nkosi, in a medley which also contained the song "Transkaroo" by Leon Schuster, in the 2012 film Mad Buddies. The music was used for an adaptation of the hymn "When I Survey the Wondrous Cross" by Isaac Watts in the Mennonite Hymnal: A Worship Book.

In Kim Stanley Robinson's Mars trilogy there is a city called Senzeni Na (founded by the Japanese). Part 7 of the book is also titled "Senzeni Na."
