= Ngomhla sibuyayo =

Song
- Language: Xhosa
- Genre: Xhosa Struggle/Anti-Apartheid songs

"Ngomhla sibuyayo" is a South African anti‐apartheid folk song. The title of the song means "On the day we return", alluding to an imminent war against the apartheid regime. An excerpt from the piece is heard at the beginning of the song "Biko" by Peter Gabriel.
