= And Through the Wire =

Song by Peter Gabriel

from the album Peter Gabriel
- Released: 1980
- Recorded: 1979–1980
- Studio: The Townhouse (London)
- Length: 5:00
- Label: Charisma Mercury
- Songwriter: Peter Gabriel
- Producer: Steve Lillywhite

"And Through the Wire" is a song written and recorded by English musician Peter Gabriel, included as the sixth track on his third solo album, Peter Gabriel. It features Paul Weller from The Jam on electric guitar, whose contributions were added after Gabriel refused a request made by an Atlantic Records record executive to make the song resemble The Doobie Brothers. Gabriel also performed "And Through the Wire" live on his 1980 tour.

== Composition ==
When asked about the lyrics of "And Through the Wire", Gabriel explained that he aimed to explore the semiotics of wires by exploring its dichotomous nature of enabling communication and its use in providing a physical barrier capable of blocking such communication.

I think the wire in that case was important to me [in] that it was two things. It was the means through which people communicated as in telephone, radio, [and] television. And at the same time it was the thing that stopped them getting too close, as in fencing wire. So I feel that a lot of communication is like that. The thing through which one speaks actually prevents communication.

Gabriel's initial idea for the lyrics was to write a song framed around two people where one is knowledgeable about many topics whereas the other knows a lot about the other person. This idea was temporarily shelved and later used on the song "Steam" from his 1992 Us album.

"And Through the Wire" is the sixth song on Gabriel's third solo album and segues out of "Family Snapshot". Gabriel believed "And Through the Wire" "would grow nicely out of the end of 'Family Snapshot'", and said that this sequencing decision was made while he was determining the running order, saying that it "certainly wasn't in mind at the time of writing." The song begins with a drone and piano before beginning with the song's chorus, featuring Weller's new wave guitar riffs. Musically, the song is built around a rock oriented arrangement with distorted guitars and the use of a cowbell, the latter of which was played by Jerry Marotta. After two additional verses and a chorus, the song transitions into a bridge with softer instrumentation in a minor key. A final chorus then follows with Gabriel singing a counterpoint melody with additional lyrics related to "clinging like leeches" and "pushing tailor-made speeches".

== Recording ==
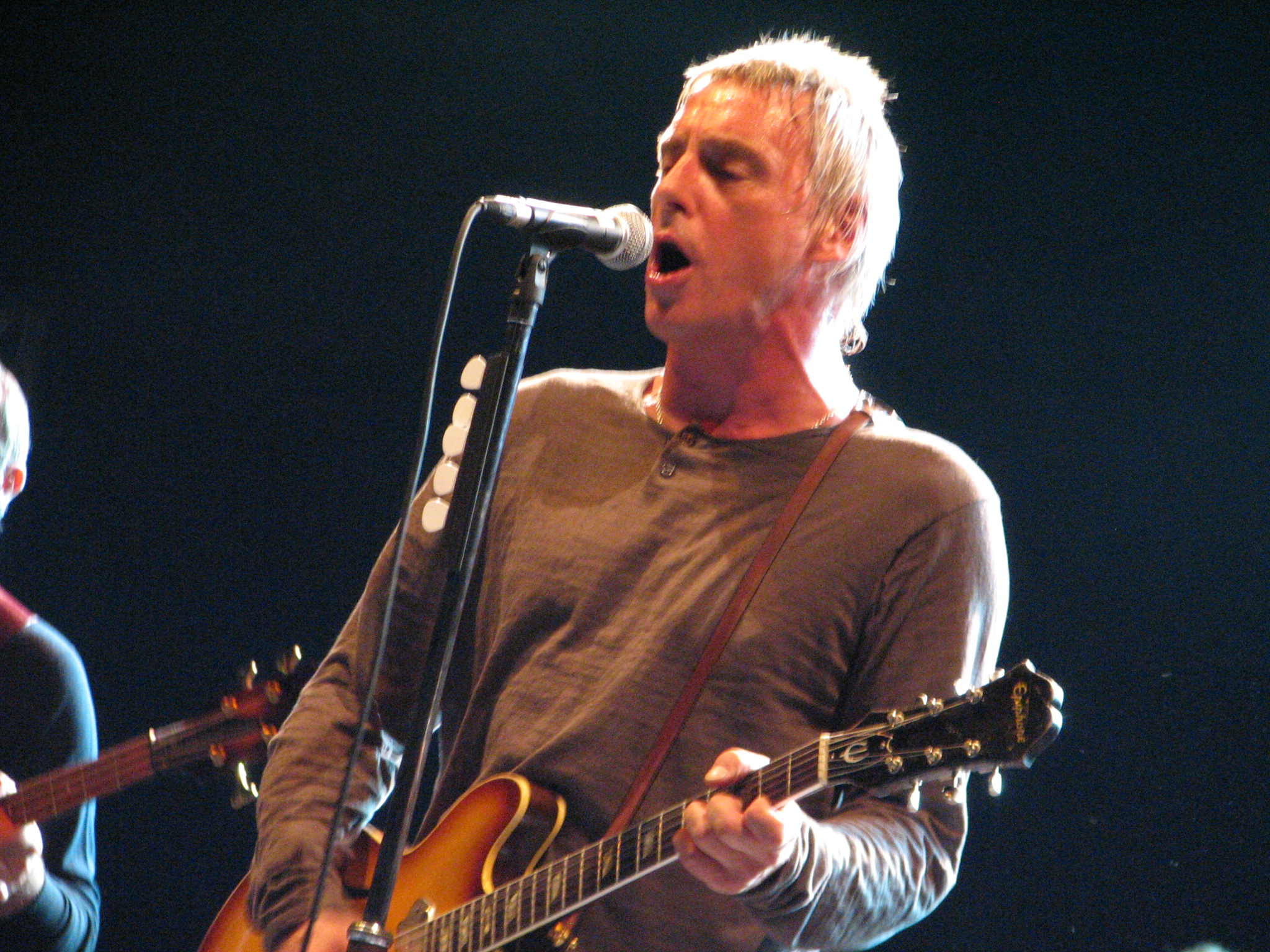
Paul Weller played the rhythm guitar part on "And Through the Wire"

During the making of his third solo album, John Kalodner, an executive from Atlantic Records visited Gabriel at the recording studio to provide feedback. Upon listening to "And Through the Wire", Kalodner suggested making the song resemble the work of The Doobie Brothers. Upon hearing this remark, Gabriel's manager at the time, Gail Colson, excused herself from the recording studio. Gabriel ignored Kalodner's feedback and instead contacted Paul Weller, who was working at Townhouse Studios, to play "some distinctly non-Californian guitar chords" as described by Phil Sutcliffe of Sounds magazine.

In my opinion, THE two English rhythm guitarists are Pete Townshend and Paul Weller.

— Peter Gabriel

According to Gabriel, the other two guitarists that he was working with, David Rhodes and Robert Fripp, were unable to achieve the part that he desired. While Gabriel was working on his solo album in Studio 1 of Townhouse Studios, The Jam was finishing their album in the adjacent room. Gabriel called Weller "great [and] very self-effacing", adding that he "love[d] watching him play, he's like liquid energy".

Weller did not bring a guitar when he originally arrived at the recording studio, and there were no additional guitars present at the time. His guitar part was overdubbed, which Steve Lillywhite, the producer of Gabriel's third solo album, believed was to the detriment of the recording, saying that it lacked "that classic, mysterious thing" that was present elsewhere on the album. Speaking about Weller's guitar part, Gabriel said that Weller was "able to straight to it" and that "the way he plays that rhythm stuff is amazing."

== Critical reception ==
Hugh Fielder of Sounds felt that the song "remains something of a puzzle after the rest of the tracks have started into fall into place" and that it did not fit with the rest of the songs on the album. He believed that the song's lyrics were "surrealistic" and made "no attempt to baffle you with profusion". Writing for New Musical Express, Nick Kent highlighted the "great chunky guitar chords" from Weller on "And Through the Wire" as among the "plethora of stunning musical moments on display" throughout Gabriel's third solo album. Robin Smith of Record Mirror described the song as "a tender tale of unfulfilled relationships where Gabriel sneers with the frustration of it all." Chris Roberts of The Quietus characterised the song as a "relatively straight-ahead rock" with "one doozey of a chorus", adding that Gabriel "sings the title line like he's gargling emeralds."

== Personnel ==
- Peter Gabriel – lead and backing vocals, piano
- David Rhodes – guitar
- Paul Weller – guitar
- John Giblin – bass guitar
- Larry Fast – synths
- Jerry Marotta – drums, percussion
