= Stage diving =

Leaping from a concert stage onto the crowd below

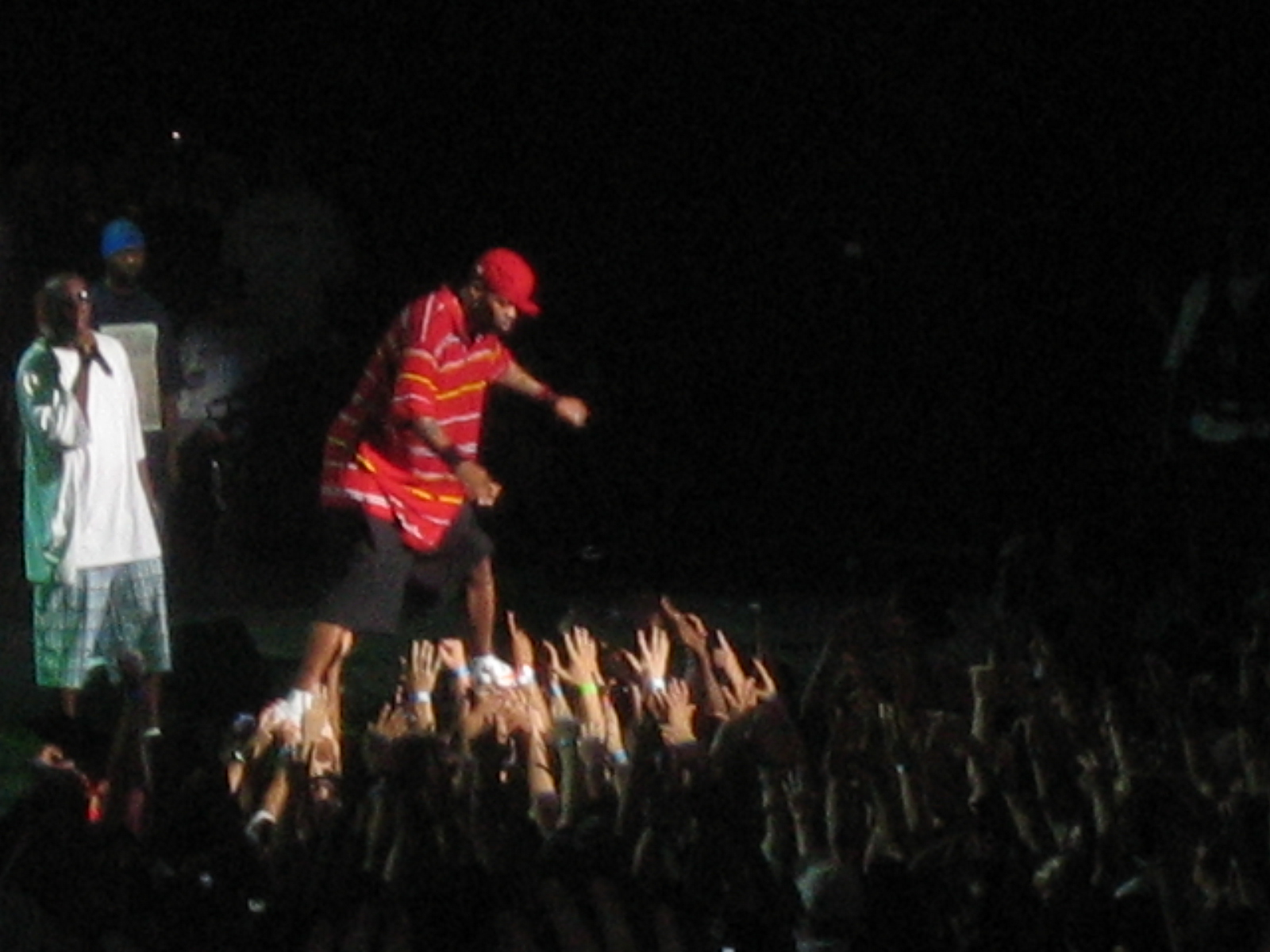
Method Man preparing to dive into the crowd at the Tweeter Center during Rock the Bells 2007

Stage diving is the act of leaping from a concert stage onto the crowd below, which occasionally causes serious injuries. It is often the precursor to crowd surfing.

Many musicians have made stage diving a part of their stage act. Jim Morrison was an early performer known for having jumped into the crowd at several concerts. Iggy Pop is often credited with popularising stage diving in popular rock music. Initially seen as confrontational and extreme, stage diving has become common at hardcore punk and thrash metal performances.

== Risks and incidents ==
Stage diving has occasionally caused serious injuries. One example is when Peter Gabriel of Genesis at the Friars club in Aylesbury on 19 June 1971 stage dove during the end of their song "The Knife", landing on his foot and breaking his ankle.

On 20 August 2010, Charles Haddon, the lead singer of English synthpop band Où Est Le Swimming Pool, died by suicide after a performance at Pukkelpop, Belgium, by jumping from a telecommunications mast in the backstage artists' parking area. Haddon was reported to have been distressed after he feared he had seriously injured a young girl earlier after a stagedive.

In February 2014, federal judge Jan E. DuBois ruled that Fishbone had to pay $1.4 million to a woman who broke her skull and collarbone during a 2010 concert in Philadelphia when Angelo Moore stage-dove and landed on top of her.

Another fatal stage diving incident occurred in May 2014 in New York City during a performance of the metalcore band Miss May I. Although the fan was able to walk away after falling from the stage, the concert was cut short after he fainted. He later died at the hospital.

In April 2024, an audience member was seriously injured after the frontman for Trophy Eyes dove from the stage during a concert in Buffalo, New York. The fan suffered a broken neck and partial paralysis after the lead singer landed on them. Stage diving had been banned at the venue since 2011 after a stage diving incident left a man with 2 broken vertebrae.

== See also ==
- Crowd surfing
- Headbanging
- List of dances
- Moshing
- Trust fall
