= Trust fall =

Trust-building game

A trust fall is an activity in which a person deliberately falls, trusting the members of a group (spotters) to catch them. It has at times been considered a popular team-building exercise in corporate training events.

There are many variants of the trust fall. In one type, the group stands in a circle, with one person in the middle with arms folded against their chest who falls in various directions, being pushed by the group back to a standing position before falling again. In another variant, a person stands on an elevated position (such as a stage, stepping stool or tree stump) and relies on multiple people to catch them. This variant is potentially more dangerous and often leads to injuries.

The trust fall was a popular activity conducted as a part of corporate team building activities. However, it fell out of favor from around the mid-2010s due to the legal liabilities associated with the trust fall and the fact that it is known to cause traumatic brain injury when the catcher or catchers fail at their task. Furthermore, while the fall may establish trust in the exercise, "there is little evidence that this trust spills over into day-to-day life".

== See also ==
- Crowd surfing
- Stage diving
