= Here Comes the Flood (song) =

1977 song by the British singer Peter Gabriel

Song by Peter Gabriel

from the album Peter Gabriel (Car)
- Released: 1977
- Recorded: 1976
- Genre: Art rock
- Length: 5:38
- Label: Charisma
- Songwriter: Peter Gabriel
- Producer: Bob Ezrin

"Here Comes the Flood" is a song by British rock musician Peter Gabriel from 1977. It first appeared on his debut solo album, Peter Gabriel (Car).

The song has been played on several Peter Gabriel tours, often forgoing the orchestral arrangement found on his 1977 eponymous release in favor of a more stripped down arrangement. Sparser re-recordings of Here Comes the Flood have been included on Robert Fripp's 1979 Exposure album and Gabriel’s 1990 compilation album, Shaking the Tree: Sixteen Golden Greats. Gabriel has performed the song in both English and German both live and in the studio. A German recording of "Here Comes the Flood" was included on the 12" single of "Biko".

== Background ==
Gabriel wrote "Here Comes the Flood" soon after his departure from Genesis in 1975. He recalled that the song was written during a warm summer evening while on the hillside above his cottage. As an experiment, Gabriel made a habit of running down the hillside one hundred paces with his eyes closed. During one of those excursions, Gabriel recalled that he felt "an energy point on the hillside and after a burst of meditation stormed down the hill to write."

The song centred around a fictional character conceived by Gabriel known as Mozo, an individual loosely based on Moses and the alchemical treatise Aurora consurgens. Gabriel dispersed several songs related to Mozo on his albums up through So in 1986, with "Here Comes the Flood" and "Down the Dolce Vita" being the first to reference the character. He considered the idea of using "Here Comes the Flood" in a multi-media rock opera based on the character of Mozo, but the idea never came to fruition.

Gabriel’s interest in shortwave radio served as a catalyst for the creation of "Here Comes the Flood". He observed that radio signals were stronger as daylight faded and believed that this correlated with an increase in psychic energy at night. During one of his dreams, Gabriel envisioned a scenario where the psychic barriers that safeguard one's thoughts would erode and thus manifest in a collective consciousness.

In an interview with Sounds magazine, he said that the lyrics pertained to the concept of a mental flood where the collective thoughts of other individuals would be made publicly available and accessible through telepathy. He posited that extroverted people would tolerate the situation but believed that those who wished to conceal their thoughts would be unable to adapt. He told The Bristol Recorder in 1981 that he viewed the lyrics as relating to a collective consciousness, which Gabriel felt would represent "a psychological breakthrough" and an "evolutionary leap".

Gabriel rehearsed "Here Comes the Flood" on a few occasions with Anthony Phillips, Mike Rutherford, and Phil Collins, all of whom were former bandmates from Genesis. During his first meeting with producer Bob Ezrin, Gabriel presented him with a demo of "Here Comes the Flood" in the producer's living room. Ezrin approved of the song and went to bed singing its melody, later commenting that "there's not many songs I've heard fresh from the artist's mouth that are that great". Rutherford recalled that the version used on Gabriel's first studio album was hardly recognizable from his original sessions with Gabriel.

== Live performances ==
Gabriel has performed "Here Comes the Flood" on his live concert tours dating back to 1977. During this concert tour, he played a truncated version of the song to open the show and performed the full version later on in the setlist. The following year, Gabriel retained the song in his setlist.

Gabriel occasionally played a solo piano rendition of "Here Comes the Flood" on his 1986–1987 This Way Up Tour, where it was positioned as one of the last songs of the set. During his first performance of the North American leg of his 2002–2003 Growing Up Tour, which took place at the United Center in Chicago, Gabriel played "Here Comes the Flood" as the second encore of the evening. "Here Comes the Flood" also served as the set opener on several occasions this tour, including his tour stops in Montreal and Philadelphia. For the Philadelphia performance, Gabriel said that would "start roughly where I left off last time", referring to when he closed with "Here Comes the Flood" when he last played in the city in July 1993.

Gabriel performed a German rendition of "Here Comes the Flood", titled "Jetzt kommt die Flut", during the German and Switzerland shows of his I/O The Tour. An earlier rendition of "Jetzt kommt die Flut" had been included on the 12" single of "Biko", a song that originally appeared on Gabriel's third solo album.

== Other versions ==
Prior to its official release, the song appeared on Thames Television's Good Afternoon television programme in the summer of 1976.

Gabriel believed that the recording found on his 1977 eponymous release was overproduced and not faithful to his original demo. In March 1978, Gabriel reworked the song with Robert Fripp on his 1979 Exposure album. Unlike the original recording found on Gabriel's 1977 eponymous release, this version only featured vocals, piano, a synthesiser played by Brian Eno, and Frippertronics, a recording technique developed by Fripp using two reel-to-reel tape machines. Gabriel said that this version adhered more to the arrangement he originally conceived.

In an interview published in the December 1979 edition of Sound International, he said that "the version on Exposure perhaps does 'more with less'. The verse on the first album version I still like, but the way we went on the choruses I would do differently." According to Gabriel, Fripp had recorded a guitar solo on their 16-track machine. Gabriel later found that the solo had been deleted, which he believed was done intentionally.

That same year, Gabriel performed the song on a BBC Two TV special, which was prefaced by a choir trio featuring Kate Bush. In 1990, Gabriel re-recorded "Here Comes the Flood" for his 1990 compilation album, Shaking the Tree: Sixteen Golden Greats. Gabriel commented that it gave him "another chance to do another version. We'd done one on the first album, which was a grand thing with an orchestra, which I think had some beautiful textures in the verse that I liked a lot, but the chorus ended up a little too bombastic. I'd done a demo prior to that with Robert Fripp, and he then did a version which was more like the demo. I wanted to take a simpler, more emotional sketch version of it and do it with voice and piano."

In 2026, Gabriel performed the song on Silo, an Apple TV dystopian television series. In the scene he appeared in, Gabriel played the song onstage during an event promoting an underground silo project in front of an audience associated with the initiative. The creator of the series, Graham Yost, had approached Gabriel about making a cameo appearance on the show, who agreed on the condition that his son could come to the set with his girlfriend, who appeared in the same scene postitioned at the side of the stage. Reed Birney, who was one of the actors cast for the series, had told Yost that the song's inclusion was "a little on the nose", to which Yost responded: "Hopefully the audience doesn't realize when Peter's singing 'say goodbye to flesh and blood' that in fact we're going to see a nuclear weapon go off later."

== Critical reception ==
Classic Rock Review complimented the instrumentation and lyrics of "Here Comes the Flood" and said that Dick Wagner's lead guitar work cemented the song as an effective album closer. Stewart Mason of AllMusic wrote that the song's lyrics "are the most depressing and paranoid ones on this relatively upbeat album, foreshadowing the increasing darkness of the next two albums. This is also the only song on the album that explicitly sounds like Genesis, right down to Steve Hunter's Steve Hackett-like guitar solos and the orchestral arrangement." NME remarked that the song "ended the album in triumphant style", and further noted the song's "doomy strings" and "searing guitars" that bolstered Gabriel's vocals.

Alan Jones of Melody Maker thought that the acoustic guitars and orchestration aptly underpinned the conviction in Gabriel's vocal delivery, adding that the lyrics were articulate enough to convey a sense of hope in enduring an apocalyptic future. They further stated that the lyrics surrounding apocalypticism were unpretentious and demonstrated admirable restraint. Winnipeg Free Press identified "Here Comes the Flood" as "one of several splendid songs with hit-single possibilities." Electronics & Music Maker quipped that the song "survived Ezrin's penchant for kitsch gimmickry and over-elaborate arrangement." Uncut said that "Here Comes the Flood" sounded "a little overcooked" in its studio form, but believed that Gabriel would later effectively incorporate the song into his live performances.

== Personnel ==
=== 1977 version ===
- Peter Gabriel – lead vocals, keyboards
- Robert Fripp – electric and classical guitar
- Dick Wagner – electric guitar
- Tony Levin – bass guitar
- Jozef Chirowski – keyboards
- Larry Fast – synthesizers
- Allan Schwartzberg – drums
- Jimmy Maelen – percussion
- London Symphony Orchestra – strings
- Michael Gibbs – conductor

=== 1990 version ===
- Peter Gabriel – lead vocals, piano
