= Crowd surfing =

When a person is passed overhead

Crowd surfing at a concert.

Crowd surfing is the process in which a person is passed overhead from person to person, often during a concert. The "crowd surfer" is passed above everyone's heads, with everyone's hands supporting the person's weight. The practice was first documented in 1970. Crowd surfing, like moshing and stage diving, carries with it a risk of injury to the surfer and other crowd members. The practice has been banned by several event organizers due to health concerns, particularly during the COVID-19 pandemic.

== Origins ==
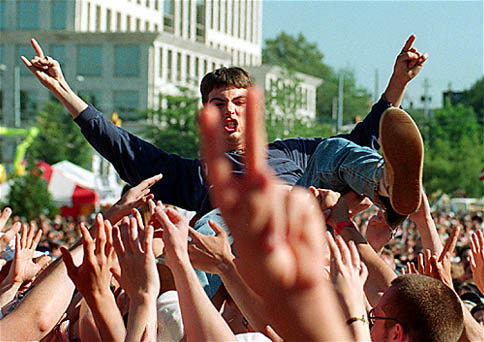
Crowdsurfer at Music Midtown festival, Atlanta, 1997

Iggy Pop leapt into the crowd at the 1970 Cincinnati Summer Pop Festival, an early example of crowd surfing.

In early 1980 Peter Gabriel crowd surfed during performances of "Games Without Frontiers" by falling into his audience "crucifix style" and then being passed around. Gabriel would later crowd surf during performances of his song "Lay Your Hands on Me".

Said Gabriel:

"Iggy Pop had jumped into an audience prior to me," Gabriel explained to Mark Blake, "but he hadn't done that thing of lying on the hands and being carried around by the audience. I had the idea from a game you did with a therapy group where you had to fall backwards and trust the person behind to catch you...At an open-air show in Chicago I was passed around and returned to the stage minus every piece of clothing except my underpants. There was an edge to doing it and part of you was praying you'd get back to the stage in one piece."

The first official video release to depict Gabriel crowd surfing was POV, a concert video released in 1990 and produced by Martin Scorsese. When Billy Joel crowdsurfed in a concert during his 1987 concert tour of the Soviet Union, bandmate Kevin Dukes described it as the "Peter Gabriel flop".

Crowd surfing extended for the first time to the classical music scene, when in June 2014 at the Bristol Proms an audience-member was ejected by fellow audience members during a performance of Handel's Messiah after he took the director's invitation to "clap and whoop" to the music a step too far by attempting to crowd-surf.

== Safety ==
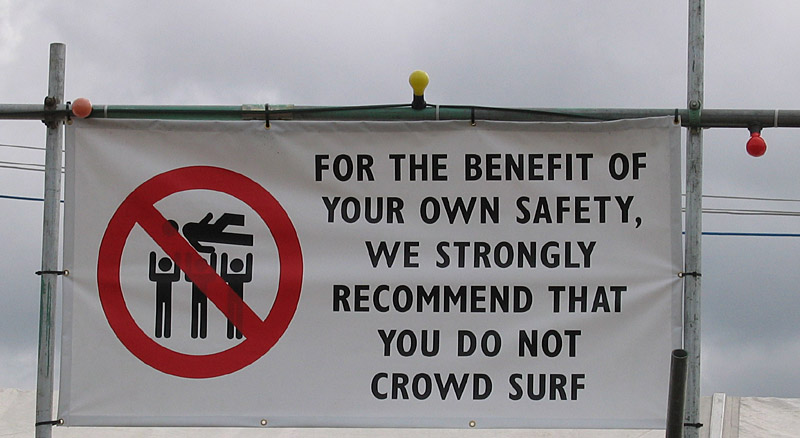
A banner advising against crowdsurfing at the 2004 Reading Festival

Crowd surfing, along with other physical audience and performer behaviors associated with concerts like moshing and stage diving, can be hazardous and has led to injuries that require hospital transport. However, few injuries sustained from crowd surfing are life-threatening; the health implications most impacted by such injuries are other more life-threatening conditions that have transportation delayed while emergency healthcare providers attend to concertgoers. Besides the safety of the one crowdsurfing, audience members may be collided with during the act, resulting in injury. Some events, such as the Warped Tour, ban moshing and crowd surfing due to safety concerns.

During the COVID-19 pandemic, crowd surfing was restricted in some locations due to inherently requiring close proximity of participants in violation of social distancing requirements. The live event industry association Event Safety Alliance published guidelines in 2020 advising that crowd surfing be prohibited during the pandemic.

== See also ==
- Headbanging
- Moshing
- Stage diving
- Trust fall
