= The Lion (album) =

Studio album by Youssou N'Dour
- Released: 1989
- Genre: Mbalax
- Label: Virgin
- Producers: David Sancious, George Acogny, Peter Gabriel

Youssou N'Dour chronology
Nelson Mandela (1986)	The Lion (1989)	Set (1990)

The Lion is an album by Youssou N'Dour, released in 1989. It was his first album to be distributed on a global scale.

== Production ==
The album was produced by David Sancious, George Acogny, and Peter Gabriel. The musicians were drawn from both Super Étoile de Dakar and Gabriel's band.

== Critical reception ==
Professional ratings
Review scores
Source	Rating
AllMusic	3/5 stars
Robert Christgau	B+
The Encyclopedia of Popular Music	3/5 stars
Hi-Fi News & Record Review	A*:2
The Rolling Stone Album Guide	3.5/5 stars
St. Petersburg Times	4/5 stars

The Los Angeles Times wrote that "the lack of definable hooks reduces the music to a luxuriant wash of sound that often buries N’Dour’s vocals." Nick Robinson, reviewer of British music newspaper Music Week, praised the album. He noticed that the "joyful, flowing" voice of Senegalese performer matches good with "colourful rhythms." In the end Robinson said: "It's probably of the strongest world music / mainstream crossover albums and it should repeat the success of the 'Shakin' the Tree' single."

Trouser Press thought that "the title track sounds like mbalax meets the Go-Go’s, while 'Old Tucson' a song about the museums N’Dour has visited on his world travels, is merely puzzling." The Washington Post opined that "some of [N'Dour's] new songs boast the bouncy, hooky tunefulness of [Paul] Simon's, and sit as comfortably atop the Central African rhythms as Simon's did atop the South African rhythms of Graceland."

== Track listing ==
1. "The Lion / Gaïende" – 5:34
2. "Shakin' the Tree" – 5:42
3. "Kocc Barma" – 4:28
4. "Bamako" – 4:19
5. "The Truth" – 4:04
6. "Old Tucson" – 5:03
7. "Macoy" – 7:17
8. "My Daughter (Sama Doom)" – 6:38
9. "Bes" – 5:07
