= Intruder (song) =

1980 song by the British singer Peter Gabriel

Song by Peter Gabriel

from the album Peter Gabriel (Melt)
- Released: 30 May 1980
- Recorded: Late 1979
- Genre: Art rock; post-punk; progressive rock
- Length: 4:54
- Label: Charisma (UK); Mercury (US)
- Songwriter: Peter Gabriel
- Producer: Steve Lillywhite

Official audio
- "Intruder" on YouTube

"Intruder" is a song written and performed by the English rock musician Peter Gabriel. The song was the first to use the "gated reverb" drum sound created by Hugh Padgham and Phil Collins, with Collins performing the song's drum part. The gated drum effect was later used in Collins' own "In the Air Tonight", and appeared frequently through the 1980s, on records such as David Bowie's "Let's Dance" and the Power Station's "Some Like It Hot".

== Composition ==
In its demo form, "Intruder" was centered around a drum machine pattern rather than live drums; Gabriel conceived the song as having a fuller arrangement at this stage of development. The working title for the song was "Marguerita", although Gabriel later changed the name to "Intruder" once further musical components were added. When the song was still titled "Marguerita", Gabriel intended for David Jackson to overdub a saxophone part, although the instrument was ultimately unused on the final recording.

The drum pattern encompasses a one bar figure with six drum strikes: the third and sixth drum hits are played on a snare drum and the remaining drum hits occur on tom-tom drums. David Rhodes created the creaking noises heard during the intro and outro by scraping the lowest string of an acoustic guitar. Rhodes used an Ovation acoustic guitar connected through a Roland Jazz Chorus amplifier on "Intruder", which was the first time he used this setup on a recording. After the introduction of the guitar scrapes, a series of dissonant and percussive guitar and piano chords follow, which later segue into a descending melodic pattern accompanied by processed vocalizations. Melodically, Gabriel structured "Intruder" around flattened fifths on his piano to give the song "a sense of menace". The song's subject matter relates to a burglar breaking into a house and is told from the intruder's perspective.

== Recording ==
The gated drum sound – which features heavily throughout the song – was achieved by Hugh Padgham and Phil Collins while working at The Townhouse with an early SSL console, which had noise gates and compressors built into every channel. The console also had a reverse talkback feature that allowed the musicians to communicate with the producers in the control room. The microphone that was used for the reverse-talkback feature had a built-in compressor was capable of picking up subtle noises in the recording studio. At the time, the microphone had been installed exclusively for communication purposes between the producers and engineers and had not been routed to the main buses of the recording console. Padgham recalled that Collins was playing the drums with the reverse talkback microphone on and said that "the most unbelievable sound came out because of the heavy compressor."

When Phil hit a drum, you would hear this massive sound, and then the noise gate would cut it off dead. The time it took to shut off, then, influenced him into playing a certain kind of beat.

— Hugh Padgham

Gabriel was excited by this development, saying that it would "revolutionise drum sounds", and subsequently built "Intruder" around the drums. He then instructed Collins to remove the cymbals from his kit and repeat the drum pattern throughout the entire song. During the song's run-through, Collins kept intuitively striking the air where his cymbals were previously situated, so Gabriel suggested that they place additional drums in those locations. The removal of these cymbals allowed Padgham to place microphones closer to Collins' drum kit.

Collins played the drum track along to a metronome from an early drum machine to maintain a consistent tempo as no other instruments had been recorded yet. To emulate the sound from the reverse talkback microphones, Padgham had originally processed the signal with the built-in compressors from the SSL recording console, although he felt that this setup failed to match what had been achieved through the reverse talkback microphone. As such, he asked one of the engineers to reroute the signal to a separate channel, which was then treated with a noise gate.

At the request of Collins, Gabriel gave him credit in the liner notes for creating the drum pattern. Gabriel contended that the gated-reverb sound had been used prior to "Intruder", specifically on Drums and Wires by XTC, where the effect was used more as a "colouring agent". However, Gabriel wanted to showcase the gated-reverb drum sound by making it the focal point of “Intruder,"

== Critical reception ==
Beat Instrumental characterised the song as an "uncanny but powerful start to the album." Reviewing the song for Record Mirror, Robin Smith thought that the song was "as awesome as the monster in Alien as it twists and turns down dark passages". In his review of Gabriel's third self-titled studio album, Chris Roberts of The Quietus described "Intruder" as "an extraordinary piece of creepy-sexy art-rock." He said that the song's narrator was represented as an "up-to-no-good stalker, breaking and entering, part-Hitchcock, part-care-in-the-community" whose "lusts and motivations [are] intense."

Stephen Thomas Erlewine of AllMusic labelled the song as an "ominous opener" that was also "undeniably alluring." He believed that some of the sounds on the recording were the scariest that Gabriel had achieved up to that point in his career.

== Personnel ==
- Peter Gabriel – piano, lead and backing vocals, whistling
- Phil Collins – drums, drum pattern
- Morris Pert – percussion
- Larry Fast – synthesizers
- David Rhodes – guitars, backing vocals

== Other versions ==
The song was often performed live by Gabriel in the early 1980s, and is included on his first live album, Plays Live (1983). It appears also on Gabriel's ninth studio album New Blood (2011) in symphonic version. Gabriel stated that the song's New Blood arrangement was inspired by the work of film director Alfred Hitchcock and composer Bernard Herrmann.

In 1992, the American rock band Primus recorded a cover version of the song and included it as the opening track to their extended play (EP) of cover songs Miscellaneous Debris. The band later covered the song again in 2018 with Brann Dailor of Mastodon at a live performance in Sterling Heights, Michigan.
