= Peter Gabriel (1980 album) =

Third solo album by Peter Gabriel

Studio album by Peter Gabriel
- Released: 30 May 1980
- Recorded: 1979
- Studios: The Manor Mobile (Bath); The Townhouse (London)
- Genres: Art rock; post-punk; post-progressive; progressive pop
- Length: 45:32
- Labels: Charisma (UK); Mercury (US 1980); Geffen (US 1983)
- Producer: Steve Lillywhite

Peter Gabriel chronology
Peter Gabriel (1978)	Peter Gabriel (1980)	Peter Gabriel (1982)

Singles from Peter Gabriel
- 1. "Games Without Frontiers" Released: January 1980; 2. "No Self Control" Released: April 1980; 3. "Biko" Released: August 1980; 4. "I Don't Remember" Released: November 1980 (US)

Peter Gabriel is the third solo studio album by the English rock musician Peter Gabriel, released on 30 May 1980 by Charisma Records. The album, produced by Steve Lillywhite, has been acclaimed as Gabriel's artistic breakthrough as a solo artist. AllMusic wrote that it established him as "one of rock's most ambitious, innovative musicians".

Building on the experimental sound of his previous self-titled studio album, it saw Gabriel embracing post-punk and new wave with an art rock sensibility. Gabriel also explored more overtly political material with the anti-war song "Games Without Frontiers" (which became a No. 4 hit and remains his joint highest-charting single in the UK) and the anti-apartheid protest song "Biko", which remembered the murdered activist Steve Biko.

The album is also often referred to as Melt, owing to its cover photograph by Hipgnosis. Some music streaming services refer to it as Peter Gabriel 3: Melt.

== Recording and production ==
When writing the album, Gabriel developed a "rhythm first" approach when writing and demoing songs for the album on an 8-track system. Synthesizer player Larry Fast introduced him to the PAiA "Programmable Drum Set", which offered full programmability, allowing Gabriel to program his own drum rhythms to build songs around during the writing process. He later bought a Roland CR-78 drum machine as well for use on the album: he felt the CR-78 sounded better but was less programmable than the PAiA drum machine.

Peter Gabriel hired his former bandmate in Genesis drummer Phil Collins for the recording sessions along with another drummer, Jerry Marotta. He gave them one specific demand. "Artists given complete freedom die a horrible death", he explained to Mark Blake. "So, when you tell them what they can't do, they get creative and say, 'Oh yes I can,' which is why I banned cymbals. Phil was cool about it. [Marotta] did object and it took him a while to settle in. It's like being right-handed and having to learn to write with your left."

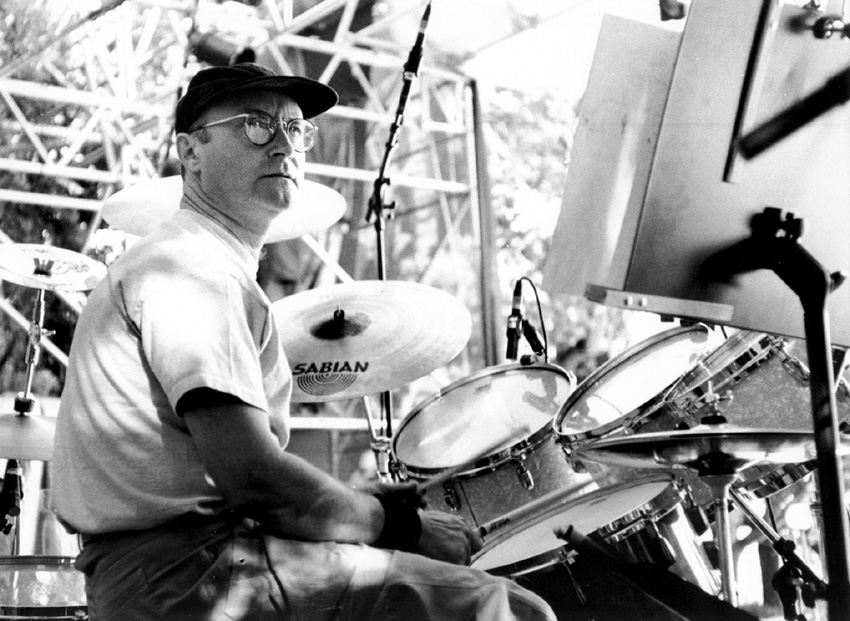
Former Genesis bandmate Phil Collins helped create the gated reverb sound on "Intruder".

Collins played on several of the album's tracks. "Intruder" has been cited as the first prominent use of a gated reverb sound. The distinctive sound was identified via experiments by producer Steve Lillywhite, Collins and staff engineer Hugh Padgham, in response to Gabriel's request that Collins and Marotta not use cymbals during the album's sessions.

Lillywhite explained: Gabriel "didn't want to use cymbals and I had been really experimenting with this ambience thing which actually started with [drummer] Kenny Morris with the first [Siouxsie and the] Banshees' album. When you listen, you can hear elements of this gated room sound, big compressed room sound that I did on the Banshees". "Padgham was my engineer when we did the Peter Gabriel album [...] but I had been pushing and experimenting before with, like the Psychedelic Furs", on "Sister Europe", [...] "all done before the Peter Gabriel album". So significant and influential was the sound that it has been claimed by Gabriel, Padgham, Collins, and Lillywhite. It was cited by Public Image Ltd as an influence on the sound of their third studio album The Flowers of Romance (1981), whose engineer, Nick Launay, was in turn employed by Collins to assist with his debut studio album, Face Value (1981). The album was also one of the first to use the Fairlight CMI sampling synthesizer: it provides subtle sampled sounds on the album, such as those audible on "Start".

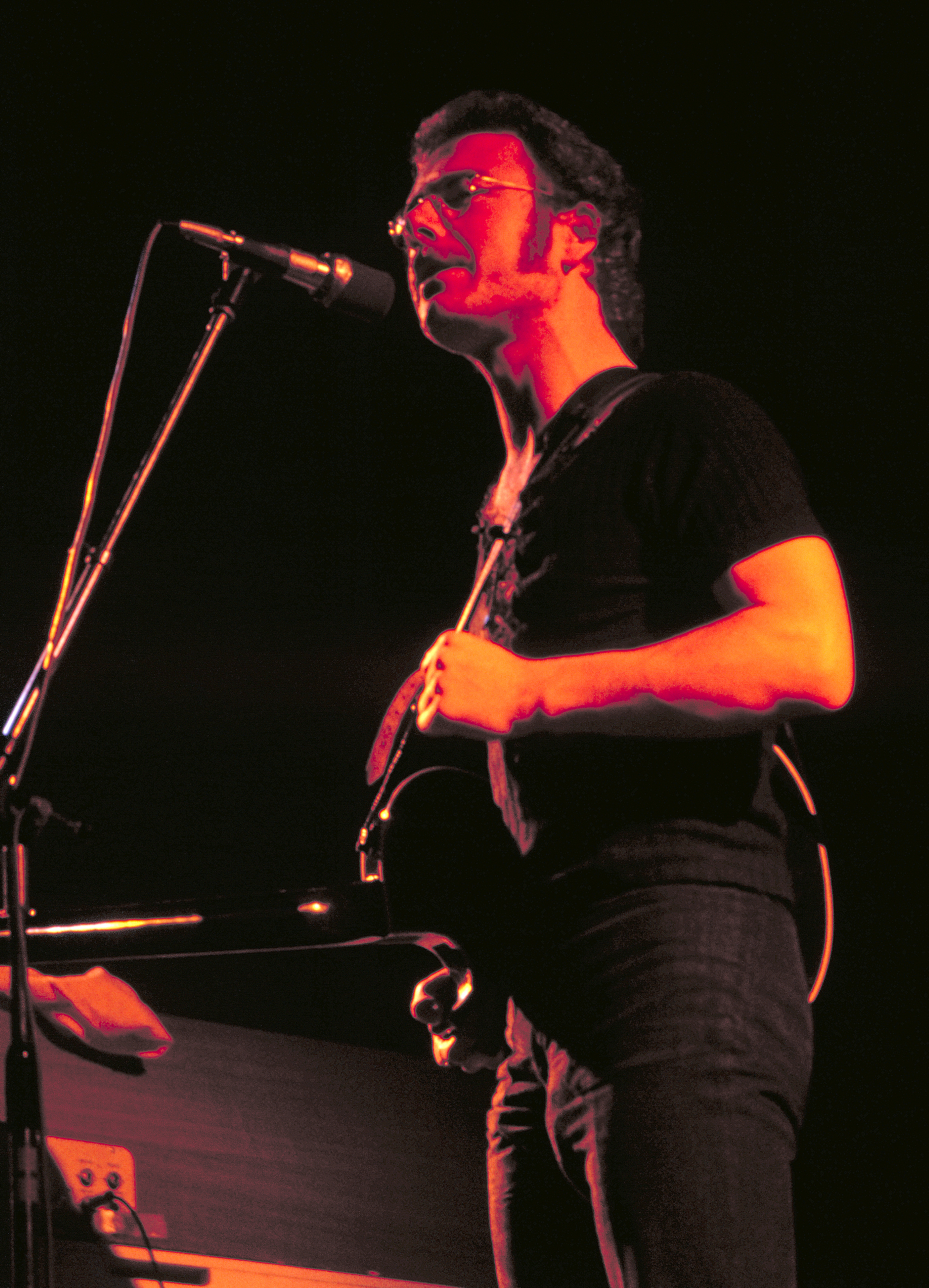
Robert Fripp's guitar parts raised concerns that they were uncommercial.

"I Don't Remember" had been performed on Gabriel's 1978 tour for his second studio album. An earlier studio version was to be the A-side of the first 7" single released in advance of the album by Charisma in Europe and Japan, but a Charisma executive thought Robert Fripp's guitar solos were not radio-friendly. This earlier version wound up as the B-side of the advance "Games Without Frontiers" single instead in those territories. It was included on the B-sides-and-rarities compilation Flotsam And Jetsam, released in 2019. The album version of this song appeared as the A-side of a 12" single in the United States and Canada. Lillywhite contacted Dave Gregory to overdub some guitars on "I Don't Remember" and "Family Snapshot". Gregory retuned his instrument to play open chords on the downbeats during the verses of "I Don't Remember" and played power chords during the choruses. When Gabriel was demonstrating the chord progression for "Family Snapshot", he accidentally played Gregory an earlier version that had been recorded in a different key.

Paul Weller, who was recording with his band the Jam in a nearby studio, contributed guitar to "And Through the Wire". Gabriel had previously said of the Jam, "I like them a lot. They're one of the new groups who have written the best songs. They're really very good." He believed the other two guitarists he was working with at the time, Fripp and David Rhodes, struggled to get the rhythm guitar to his specifications and said that Weller's guitar style was ideal for the track.

Commenting on his lyrics, Gabriel jokingly summarised the album's themes as "the history of a decaying mind". He added: "State of mind was definitely an area of interest at the time of writing it, but I never really set out with a concept. It was merely different songs, which perhaps have fitted into one particular slant." Of "No Self Control", he said: "That's something which I've observed in myself and in other people… In a state of depression, you have to turn on the radio, or switch on the television, go to the fridge and eat, and sleeping is difficult."

== Artwork ==
The album cover, inspired by the work of photographer Les Krims, shows an image of Gabriel in which the left side of his face appears to be melting. The effect was achieved by repeatedly taking his picture with a Polaroid SX-70 instant camera, then using various objects to smear and distort the pictures as they developed. These photos were taken in colour, and the final distorted image was re-shot in black and white. Designer Storm Thorgerson said, "Peter himself joined with us at Hipgnosis in disfiguring himself by manipulating Polaroids as they 'developed' ... Peter impressed us greatly with his ability to appear in an unflattering way, preferring the theatrical or artistic to the cosmetic."

== Release ==
Upon hearing mixes of session tapes in early 1980, Atlantic Records A&R executive John Kalodner deemed the album not commercial enough for release, and recommended Atlantic drop Gabriel from its roster. "Atlantic Records didn't want to put it out at all", Gabriel told Mark Blake. "Ahmet Ertegun said, 'What do people in America care about this guy in South Africa?' and 'Has Peter been in a mental hospital?' because there was this very weird track called 'Lead a Normal Life'. They thought I'd had a breakdown and recorded a piece of crap ... I thought I'd really found myself on that record, and then someone just squashes it. I went through some primordial rejection issues." As a result of the rejection, the release was pushed back from its original intended February 1980 release date so a new US deal could be secured with Mercury Records before releasing the album worldwide.

The album was released by Mercury Records in the United States, having been rejected by Atlantic Records, which had handled US distribution for Gabriel's first two solo studio albums. It was a commercial success, becoming his first to top the UK charts as well as reach No. 22 on the US Billboard chart, his highest position there to date. In addition, the single "Games Without Frontiers" became his biggest hit to that point, charting at No. 4 UK. After all the trouble incurred when Atlantic dropped the album, Gabriel stated that he felt vindicated by the public's reaction.

By the time the album was released by Mercury several months later, Kalodner – now working for the newly formed Geffen Records label and having realised his mistake – arranged for Geffen to pursue Gabriel as one of its first artist signings. Geffen (at the time distributed by Atlantic sister label Warner Bros. Records) reissued the album in 1983, after Mercury's rights to it lapsed, and marketed it in the United States until 2010, when Gabriel's back catalogue was reissued independently by Real World Records.

The studio album was released as a self-titled album in the UK on 30 May 1980 on Charisma Records. The album was preceded by the singles "Games Without Frontiers" and "No Self Control" in that country, the latter of which was still climbing the UK charts at the time of the album's release. It was promoted in the country through advertisements in various publications such as The Guardian, Evening Standard, and Time Out. 500 window displays were also displayed throughout the country, which included plastic stickers and bill posting. A German-language version of the album, titled Ein deutsches Album (A German Album), was released on 27 June 1980.

The album was remastered, along with most of Gabriel's catalogue, in 2002.

== Critical reception ==
Professional ratings
Review scores
Source	Rating
AllMusic	5/5 stars
Chicago Sun-Times	3.5/4 stars
Christgau's Record Guide	B−
Classic Rock	10/10
Entertainment Weekly	A−
Mojo	5/5 stars
Q	4/5 stars
Rolling Stone	4/5 stars
The Rolling Stone Album Guide	4/5 stars
Uncut	9/10

In his review for Rolling Stone, Dave Marsh described Peter Gabriel as "a tremendous record" that "sticks in the mind like the haunted heroes of the best film noirs". Billboard labelled it as his "most non-mainstream" release that was "not very commercial". They characterised it as "heavily percussive with an odd synthesizer base" with "bizarre lyrics" that "add to the mysterious sound of the record." Record World felt that the album marked a continuation of Gabriel "explor[ing] the limits of popular music". Cashbox called it an "artistic tour de force" that represented "a quantum leap for rock music as an art form".

In 1989, Peter Gabriel was ranked at No. 46 on Rolling Stone's list of the 100 best albums of the 1980s. In 2000, Q placed the album at No. 53 on its list of the "100 Greatest British Albums Ever"; six years later, the magazine placed it at No. 29 on its list of the 40 best albums of the 1980s. In 2018, Pitchfork ranked Peter Gabriel at No. 125 on its revised and expanded list of the 200 best albums of the 1980s. In 2020, Rolling Stone included this record in their "80 Greatest albums of 1980" list, praising Gabriel "for a haunting LP that touches on political assassinations ("Family Snapshot"), the futility of war ("Games Without Frontiers"), and the brutal murder of South African activist Steve Biko ("Biko"). He made more popular albums after this one, but never better ones."

== Track listing ==
All tracks are written by Peter Gabriel.

Side one
No.	Title	Length
1.	"Intruder"	4:54
2.	"No Self Control"	3:55
3.	"Start"	1:21
4.	"I Don't Remember"	4:42
5.	"Family Snapshot"	4:28
6.	"And Through the Wire"	5:00

Side two
No.	Title	Length
7.	"Games Without Frontiers"	4:06
8.	"Not One of Us"	5:22
9.	"Lead a Normal Life"	4:14
10.	"Biko"	7:32

== Ein deutsches Album ==
Ein deutsches Album (English: A German Album), released in June 1980, is a German-language version of Peter Gabriel. Gabriel sang German vocals on top of the instrumental backing tracks. He explained his rationale behind the project in an interview published in Cashbox, saying that "rhythmically speaking, German is a fascinating language. The vocal harshness of the language gives the lyrics a phonetically mechanical flair." The German adaptation was done by Horst Königstein. The German version of "Games Without Frontiers" was released as a single in Germany under the title "Spiel ohne Grenzen", with a German version of "Here Comes the Flood" ("Jetzt kommt die Flut") included as its B-side. Two years later, Gabriel released Deutsches Album (1982), a significantly altered version of his fourth studio album Peter Gabriel (1982).

All tracks are written by Peter Gabriel.

Side one
No.	Title	Length
1.	"Eindringling"	5:00
2.	"Keine Selbstkontrolle"	4:00
3.	"Frag mich nicht immer" (Combines the instrumental "Start" with the German version of I Don't Remember)	6:04
4.	""Schnappschuß (Ein Familienfoto)"	4:26
5.	"Und durch den Draht"	4:28

Side two
No.	Title	Length
6.	"Spiel ohne Grenzen"	4:07
7.	"Du bist nicht wie wir"	5:32
8.	"Ein normales Leben"	4:21
9.	"Biko"	8:55

== Personnel ==
Credits adapted from album's liner notes.

=== Musicians ===
- Peter Gabriel – lead vocals, backing vocals (1, 5, 8), piano, synthesizer (3, 4, 7, 8), synth bass (7), drum pattern (10), whistle (7)
- Larry Fast – synthesizer (1–3, 7, 10), processing (2, 4, 8), synth bass (7), bagpipes (10)
- Peter Vogel – computer musical instrument
- David Rhodes – guitar (1, 2, 4–10), backing vocals (1, 4, 8)
- Robert Fripp – electric guitar (2, 4, 8)
- Dave Gregory – electric guitar (4, 5)
- Paul Weller – electric guitar (6)
- John Giblin – bass (2, 5, 6–8)
- Tony Levin – Chapman Stick (4)
- Jerry Marotta – drums (4–10), percussion (7, 8)
- Phil Collins – drums (1, 2), drum pattern (1), snare (5), surdo (10)
- Morris Pert – percussion (1, 2, 9)
- Dick Morrissey – saxophone (2, 3, 5, 9)
- Kate Bush – backing vocals (2, 7)
- Steve Lillywhite – whistles (7)
- Hugh Padgham – whistles (7)
- Dave Ferguson – screeches (10)

=== Technical ===
- Produced by Steve Lillywhite
- Engineered by Hugh Padgham
- Assistant engineers – Nick Thomas, Steve Prestage, Marlis Duncklau, and George Chambers
- Mastered by Ian Cooper
- Equipment – Albert Lawrence and Dave Price
- Sleeve design and photography – Hipgnosis
- SX-70 techniques – Les Krims
- Liner drawings – Colin Chambers
- Personal assistant – Jennifer Hiles
- Management – Gail Colson and Tony Smith

== Charts ==
Chart (1980)	Peak position
Australian Albums (Kent Music Report)	29
Canada Top Albums/CDs (RPM)	7
French Albums (SNEP)	1
German Albums (Offizielle Top 100)	9
UK Albums (Official Charts)	1
US Billboard 200	22

== Certifications ==
Region	Certification	Certified units/sales
Australia (ARIA)	Gold	20,000^{^}
Canada (Music Canada)	2× Platinum	200,000^{^}
France (SNEP)	Gold	100,000^{*}
United Kingdom (BPI)	Gold	100,000^{^}
^{*} Sales figures based on certification alone.^{^} Shipments figures based on certification alone.
