= Biko (song) =

1980 song by Peter Gabriel

- 1980 artwork for UK 7" release, also used for the German vinyl release

Single by Peter Gabriel

from the album Peter Gabriel (Melt)
- B-side: "Shosholoza"; "Jetzt kommt die Flut" (Note: Horst Königstein's German translation of "Here Comes the Flood")
- Released: 15 August 1980
- Recorded: 1979
- Genre: Worldbeat; afropop; protest song
- Length: 7:32 (album version); 6:55 (single version)
- Label: Charisma
- Songwriter: Peter Gabriel
- Producer: Steve Lillywhite

Peter Gabriel singles chronology
| "No Self Control" (1980) | "Biko" (1980) | "I Don't Remember" (1980) |

Music video
- "Biko" on YouTube

"Biko" is an anti-apartheid protest song by the English rock musician Peter Gabriel. It was released by Charisma Records as a single from Gabriel's eponymous third studio album in 1980.

The song is a musical eulogy, inspired by the death of the black South African anti-apartheid activist Steve Biko in police custody on 12 September 1977. Gabriel wrote the song after hearing of Biko's death on the news. Influenced by Gabriel's growing interest in African musical styles, his recording of it carries a sparse two-tone beat played on Brazilian drum and vocal percussion, in addition to a distorted guitar, and a synthesised bagpipe sound. The lyrics, which include phrases in Xhosa, describe Biko's death and the violence under the apartheid government. The song is book-ended with recordings of songs sung at Biko's funeral: the album version begins with "Ngomhla sibuyayo" and ends with "Senzeni Na?", while the single versions end with "Nkosi Sikelel' iAfrika".

"Biko" reached No. 38 on the British charts, and was positively received, with critics praising the instrumentation, the lyrics, and Gabriel's vocals. A 2013 commentary called it a "hauntingly powerful" song, while review website AllMusic described it as a "stunning achievement for its time". It was banned in South Africa, where the government saw it as a threat to security. "Biko" was a personal landmark for Gabriel, becoming one of his most popular songs and sparking his involvement in human rights activism. It also had a huge political impact, and along with other contemporary music critical of apartheid, is credited with making resistance to apartheid part of Western popular culture. It inspired musical projects such as Sun City, and has been called "arguably the most significant non-South African anti-apartheid protest song".

== Background ==
Bantu Stephen Biko was an anti-apartheid activist who was a founding member of the South African Students' Organisation in 1968 and the Black People's Convention in 1972. Through these groups and other activities he promoted the ideas of the Black Consciousness movement, and became a prominent member of the resistance to apartheid in the 1970s. The government of South Africa placed a banning order on him in 1973, preventing him from leaving his hometown, meeting with more than one person, publishing his writing, and speaking in public. In August 1977 Biko was arrested for breaking his banning order.

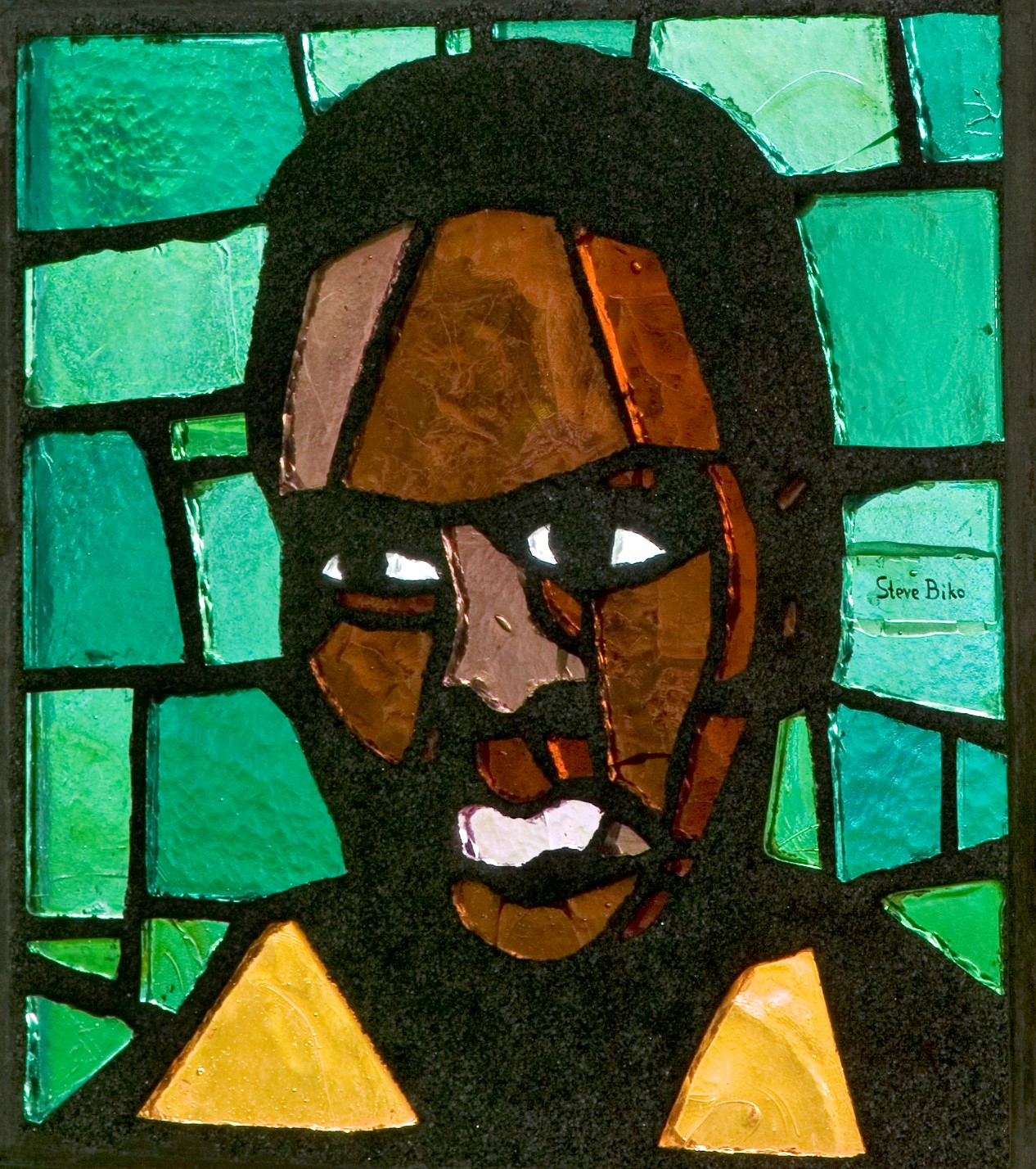
Steve Biko on a Heerlen church stained glass window

After his arrest Biko was held in custody in Port Elizabeth, Eastern Cape, for several days, during which he was interrogated. During his interrogation he was severely beaten by some of the policemen questioning him. He suffered severe injuries (including to his brain) and died soon afterward, on 12 September 1977. News of his death spread quickly, and became a symbol of the abuses perpetrated under the apartheid government. Biko's position as an individual who had never been convicted of a crime led to the death being reported in the international press; he thus became one of the first anti-apartheid activists widely known internationally.

Several musicians wrote songs about Biko, including Tom Paxton, Peter Hammill, Steel Pulse, and Tappa Zukie. British musician Peter Gabriel, who heard of Biko's death through the BBC's coverage of the event, was moved by the story and began researching his life, based on which he wrote a song about the killing. This coincided with Gabriel becoming interested in African musical styles, which influenced his third solo album Peter Gabriel (1980), also known as Melt, on which the song "Biko" was ultimately included. Gabriel was also influenced to write the song through his association with politically inclined new-wave musician Tom Robinson; Robinson is said to have encouraged Gabriel to release the piece when Gabriel began to have doubts. Though there were other political songs on the album, "Biko" was the only piece that was explicitly a protest song.

== Music and lyrics ==
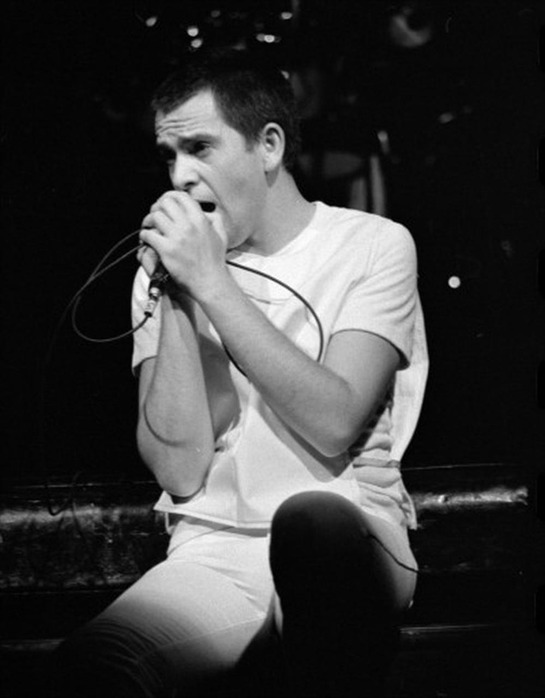
Gabriel performing in 1978

Gabriel crafted the basic track for "Biko" in one month, and spent around one year refining the lyrics. The song begins in a manner similar to a news story, saying "September '77/Port Elizabeth, weather fine". The next lines mention "police room 619", the room in the police station of Port Elizabeth in which Biko was beaten. The English lyrics are broken up by the Xhosa phrase "Yila Moja" (also transliterated "Yehla Moya") meaning "Come Spirit": the phrase has been read as a call to Biko's spirit to join the resistance movement, and as a suggestion that though Biko was dead, his spirit was still alive.

The tone of the song shifts after the first verse, growing more defiant, and the second verse of the song criticises the violence under apartheid, with Gabriel singing about trying to sleep but being able to "only dream in red" because of his anger at the death of black people. The lyrics of the third verse seek to motivate the listener: "You can blow out a candle/But you can't blow out a fire/Once the flames begin to catch/The wind will blow it higher", suggesting that though Biko is dead, the movement against apartheid would continue. The lyrics express a sense of outrage, not only at the suffering of people under apartheid, but at the fact that that suffering was often forgotten or denied.

Gabriel incorporated three songs by other composers into his recording. The album version of the songs start with an excerpt from the South African song "Ngomhla sibuyayo" and ends with a recording of the South African song "Senzeni Na?", as sung at Biko's funeral. These recordings were captured on a cassette by an English reporter who attended Biko's funeral and lent to Gabriel. The 7- and 12-inch single versions ended instead with an excerpt from "Nkosi Sikelel iAfrika", a song which would later become South Africa's National Anthem. The German version of the song began and ended with "Nkosi Sikelel iAfrika". The recording ends with a double drum beat reminiscent of gun shots that cuts off the singers at the funeral, seen as representing a repressive government.

The recording at the beginning of the song fades into a two-toned percussion, played on a Brazilian Surdo drum, described by Gabriel as the "spine of the piece". "Biko" makes use of a "hypnotic" drum beat throughout the song, influenced strongly by African rhythms Gabriel had heard. Gabriel would credit the soundtrack LP Dingaka with influencing the percussion of the track. Music scholar Michael Drewett writes that Gabriel tried to create an "exotic" African beat "without really approximating the sound he imitated", thus creating a "pseudo-African" beat. The tune is punctuated with vocal percussive sounds that have a "primordial" feeling, combining Gaelic and African influences. The drums are overlaid with an artificially distorted two-chord guitar sound, which fades out briefly during the vocal percussion, before returning during the first verse. Gabriel also experimented with beating in the synth drones, which sustain on the A note at slightly different frequencies.

The first verse describing Biko's death is followed by a distinct chord change before the Xhosa invocation "Yehla Moya". The sound of bagpipes, created with a synthesiser, enters the song during the interlude between the verses. Played in a "mournful" minor key, they have been variously described as creating a "funeral" and a "militaristic" atmosphere. The bagpipes continue alongside the drums and guitar through the second verse, followed by an interlude identical to the first. A snare drum is also added to the sound for the second and third verses. The third verse concludes with a non-verbal chant following the chord progression of the song, while the climax is a chorus of male voices, accompanied by bagpipes and drums.

== Recording ==
Gabriel provided lead vocals and piano. The guitarist for "Biko" was David Rhodes, Gabriel's longtime collaborator. Other participants included Jerry Marotta on drums, Phil Collins on surdo, Larry Fast on synths and synthesised bagpipes, and Dave Ferguson on screeches, who was a member of Random Hold with Rhodes. Commenting on the screech noise, Gabriel said that Ferguson's part was processed with an Echoplex and that the end result was "one of the most haunting sounds that I've ever heard."

The musical origins of the song began with an African rhythm that Gabriel loaded into a small PAiA Electronics electronic drum box introduced by Fast. Gabriel said that the rhythmic starting point informed his decision to create relatively simple lyrics and melodic accompaniment. Fast added some synth drones using a Moog synthesizer and created the sounds of synthesised bagpipes by detuning some pulse wave drones with an Eventide harmonizer. Rhodes played his guitar parts on a Fender Jazzmaster utilising drone tones that primarily alternates between the musical notes of A and D.

== Release ==
"Biko" was included on Gabriel's third solo album Peter Gabriel III (1980) (a.k.a. Melt) released by Charisma Records in 1980. At seven and one-half minutes, it was the album's longest song. The track was later included on his 1990 compilation Shaking the Tree: Sixteen Golden Greats.

In the United Kingdom, Charisma Records released "Biko" as the third single from Gabriel's third self-titled album. Gabriel donated the proceeds from both versions of the single to the Black Consciousness Movement in South Africa. These donations would total more than 50,000 pounds. The B-side of the 7" version contained Gabriel's version of the Ndebele folk song "Shosholoza", while the 12" version also carried a German vocal version of Gabriel's 1977 track "Here Comes the Flood". Gabriel had first heard "Shosholoza" on the Dingaka soundtrack and credited the song's arrangers, Basil Gray and Bertha Egnos, as co-writers of his version, which was recorded at Crescent Studios in Bath, Somerset.

"Biko" was featured prominently in "Evan", the penultimate episode of the first season of the American television show Miami Vice in 1985. Despite being banned by the SABC at the time, the song was not censored when the episode aired in South Africa, allowing many there to hear it for the first time."Biko" was released as a single in 1980 and reached No. 38 on the British charts. The 1987 live version reached No. 49 in the UK. Soon after its release, a copy of "Biko" was seized by South African customs and submitted to the Directorate of Publications, which banned the song and the album on which it featured for being critical of apartheid, calling it "harmful to the security of the State". Thus, despite enduring popularity outside South Africa, it had no presence within the country.

== Critical reception ==
The song received strongly positive responses from critics, and it was frequently cited as the highlight of the album. Phil Sutcliffe in Sounds magazine said the song was "so honest you might even risk calling it truth". Music Week called the 1987 live recording of "Biko" a "powerful" rendition. Music website AllMusic called "Biko" a "stunning achievement for its time", and went on to say that "It's odd that such a bleak song can sound so freeing and liberating". Writing in 2013, Mark Pedelty would say that "Biko" "stood out for its unusual instrumentation (bagpipes and synthesiser), haunting vocals, and funerary chant," and credited Gabriel with doing a "masterful job of creating catalytic imagery and getting out of the way". Music scholar Michael Drewett wrote that the lyrics skillfully engaged the listener by moving from a specific story to a call for action. In 2016, Gabriel's biographer Durrell Bowman ranked "Biko" as among Gabriel's 11 most popular songs.

The musical elements of the song also received praise. Drewett stated that Gabriel's singing throughout the song was "clear and powerful". Though Drewett questioned the use of bagpipes, he stated that they heightened the emotional effect of the song. 2013, scholar Ingrid Byerly called "Biko" a "hauntingly powerful" song, with "a hypnotic drumbeat thundering beneath commanding guitar, lyrical bagpipe dirges, and the intense eulogy of Gabriel's voice". A review in Rolling Stone was more critical of the song, saying that the melody and rhythms of the piece were "irresistible", but that the song was a "muddle", and that "what Gabriel [had] to say was mostly sentimental."

Gabriel's use of Xhosa lyrics have been read by scholars as evidence of the "authenticity" of Gabriel's effort to highlight Biko. By using a language that many South Africans, and the majority of outsiders, did not know, the words trigger curiosity; in the words of Byerly, "compelling [listeners]...to become, like Gabriel, insiders to the struggle". In contrast, scholar Derek Hook has written that the song highlighted the artist, rather than Biko himself, and "[secured] for the singer and his audience a kind of anti-racist social capital". Hook questioned whether the "consciousness raising" efforts of the song could turn into "anti-racist narcissism". Drewett stated that the use of a simplistic and generic "African" beat was an indication of an "imperial imagination" in the song's composition.

== Impact and legacy ==
"Biko" had an enormous political impact. It has been credited with creating a "political awakening" both in terms of awareness of the brutalities of apartheid, and of Steve Biko as a person. It greatly raised Biko's profile, making his name known to millions of people who had not previously heard of him, and came to symbolise Biko in the popular imagination. Byerly writes that it was an example of the "right song written at the right time by the right person"; it was released in circumstances of social tension that contributed to its popularity and influence. It triggered a rise in enthusiasm for fighting against apartheid internationally, and has been described as "arguably the most significant non-South African anti-apartheid protest song".

"Biko" was at the forefront of a stream of anti-apartheid music in the 1980s, and sparked a worldwide interest in music exploring the politics and society of South Africa. Along with songs such as "Free Nelson Mandela" by The Specials, and "Sun City" by Artists United Against Apartheid, "Biko" has been described as part of the "soundtrack for the global divestment movement", which sought to persuade divestment from companies doing business in apartheid South Africa. These songs have been described as making the fight against apartheid part of Western popular culture. Gabriel's piece has been credited as the inspiration for many of the anti-apartheid songs that followed it. Steven Van Zandt, the driving force behind the 1985 track "Sun City" and the Artists United Against Apartheid initiative, stated that hearing "Biko" inspired him to begin those projects; on the cover of the album, he thanked Gabriel "for the profound inspiration of his song ‘Biko’ which is where my journey to Africa began". Irish singer and U2 frontman Bono called Gabriel to tell him that U2 had learned of the effects of apartheid from "Biko".

The song was a landmark for Gabriel's career. "Biko" has been called Gabriel's first political song, his "most enduring political tune", and "Arguably [his] first masterpiece". It caught the attention of activist organisations, and in particular anti-apartheid groups and human rights organisations such as Amnesty International (AI). "Biko" became popular among AI workers, along with Gabriel's 1982 song "Wallflower". The song triggered Gabriel's involvement in musical efforts against apartheid: he supported the "Sun City" project, and participated in two musical tours organised by AI: A Conspiracy of Hope in 1986, and Human Rights Now! in 1988. It also led to him beginning a deeper involvement in those groups.

== Live performances ==
During his live performances of "Biko", Gabriel frequently concluded asking the audience to engage in political action, saying "I've done what I can, the rest is up to you." It was often the last song of a performance, with the band members gradually leaving the stage during the song's concluding drum coda.

Artwork for 1987 vinyl re-release; the CD single uses the similar artwork, but the title and artist name positioned on the right side

For live performances of "Biko" during Gabriel's 1986–1987 This Way Up Tour, triggers were attached to the drums to activate sounds that were sampled from the studio recording. These sounds were sampled with an Akai S900, which was then sampled to three different tunings, layered together, and assigned to the drum triggers that were placed on the tom-tom rims. An additional sample that ran through an Roland Octapad was assigned to the bass drum. During early performances on the tour, the drum samples were triggered at the incorrect times, so a Garfield Drum Doctor was used to filter out frequencies that accidentally activated the sampled sounds.

A live version, recorded in July 1987 at the Blossom Music Center in Cuyahoga Falls, Ohio, was released as a single later that year, to promote Richard Attenborough's Biko biopic Cry Freedom. On the re-recording, Gabriel commented that the song was being released to promote the film and "draw attention to what is still going on in the name of apartheid." The music video consists of clips from the film and Gabriel singing. The song did not appear in the actual film. Proceeds from the live single were directed toward anti-apartheid funds, specifically the International Defense Fund for Southern Africa and the Africa Fund. This single was accompanied with the song "No More Apartheid" as the B-side, which Gabriel had created for the Sun City album.

Gabriel sang the piece at Nelson Mandela 70th Birthday Tribute concert at Wembley Stadium in 1988. The concert featured a number of well-known artists, including Dire Straits, Miriam Makeba, Simple Minds, Eurythmics, and Tracy Chapman. That same year, Gabriel also performed the song at River Plate Stadium in Buenos Aires, Argentina during the Human Rights Now! tour.

== Personnel ==
Credits from the Melt liner notes.

- Peter Gabriel – vocals, piano, drum pattern
- David Rhodes – guitar
- Larry Fast – synthesizers, bagpipes
- Jerry Marotta – drums
- Phil Collins – surdo
- Dave Ferguson – screeches

== Charts ==
=== Studio version ===
| Chart (1980) | Peak position |
|---|---|
| UK Singles (Official Charts Company) | 38 |

=== Live version ===
| Chart (1987) | Peak position |
|---|---|
| Italy Airplay (Music & Media) | 14 |
| New Zealand (Recorded Music NZ) | 43 |
| UK Singles (Official Charts) | 49 |

== Other versions ==
"Biko" has been covered by a number of well-known artists. Robert Wyatt's 1984 version from his Work in Progress EP made #35 in that year's John Peel Festive Fifty. Folk musicians and activist Joan Baez recorded a version on her 1987 album Recently. Simple Minds released a cover version on their 1989 album Street Fighting Years, having earlier included it on their Ballad of the Streets EP, a version later featured on other collections of their music. It was covered by Cameroonian musician Manu Dibango on his 1994 album Wakafrika. Dibango's version also featured Gabriel, Sinéad O'Connor, Ladysmith Black Mambazo, Geoffrey Oryema, and Alex Brown. Folk-rock musician Paul Simon recorded a cover of the song for inclusion on the 2013 Gabriel tribute album And I'll Scratch Yours.

In 2021, a version of Biko was recorded and released through Playing for Change in honor of Black History Month, 40 years after the song's initial release. More than 25 musicians from seven countries joined Gabriel on the recording, including Beninese vocalist and activist Angélique Kidjo, cellist Yo-Yo Ma and bassist Meshell Ndegeocello.

== See also ==
- Peter Gabriel discography
- Cry Freedom, 1987 film about Biko

== Sources ==
- Bowman, Durrell (2016). Experiencing Peter Gabriel. Lanham, MD: Rowman and Littlefield. ISBN 9781442251991.
- Pollock, Bruce (2014). Rock Song Index: The 7500 Most Important Songs for the Rock and Roll Era. Routledge. p. 31. ISBN 9781135462963.
- Byerly, Ingrid Bianca (2016). "Musical Markers as Catalysts in Social Revolutions: The Case of Gabriel's Biko". In Drewett, Michael; Hill, Sarah; Kärki, Kimi (eds.). Peter Gabriel: From Genesis to Growing Up. Abingdon, UK: Routledge. pp. 113–130. ISBN 9781351554299.
- Drewett, Michael (February 2007). "The Eyes of the World Are Watching Now: The Political Effectiveness of 'Biko' by Peter Gabriel". Popular Music and Society. 30 (1): 39–51. doi:10.1080/03007760500504929. S2CID 143464359.
- Drewett, Michael; Hill, Sarah; Kärki, Kimi (2016). Drewett, Michael; Hill, Sarah; Kärki, Kimi (eds.). Peter Gabriel: From Genesis to Growing Up. Abingdon, UK: Routledge. pp. 1–14. ISBN 9781351554299.
- Easlea, Daryl (2013). Without Frontiers: The Life & Music of Peter Gabriel. Omnibus Press. ISBN 9780857128607.
- Hook, Derek (2011). "Retrieving Biko: a black consciousness critique of whiteness" (PDF). African Identities. 9 (1): 19–32. doi:10.1080/14725843.2011.530442. S2CID 143563289.
- Mangcu, Xolela (2014). Biko: A Life. London / New York: I. B. Tauris. ISBN 978-1-78076-785-7.
- Marziano, Alfredo; Perasi, Luca (2024). Peter Gabriel: The Rhythm Has My Soul. Milan, Italy: L.I.L.Y Publishing. ISBN 978-88-909122-5-2.
- Pedelty, Mark (2013). "Peter Gabriel: The Masked Activist". In Pedelty, Mark; Weglarz, Kristine (eds.). Political Rock. Ashgate. pp. 23–36. ISBN 9781409473053.
- Schumann, Anne (2008). "The Beat that Beat Apartheid: The Role of Music in the Resistance against Apartheid in South Africa" (PDF). Wiener Zeitschrift für Kritische Afrikastudien. 14 (8).
- Woods, Donald (1978). Biko. New York / London: Paddington Press. ISBN 978-0-8050-1899-8.
