= WaveFrame AudioFrame =

Digital audio workstation

AudioFrame
- Manufacturer: WaveFrame
- Price: US $50,000

Technical specifications
- Synthesis type: Sampler

Input/output

The Audioframe is a digital audio workstation with sampler, hard disk recorder and digital mixer.

WaveFrame received a Technical Oscar in 2004 for digital audio workstations with editing capabilities applicable to movies.
