= Paapa Yankson =

Ghanaian highlife musician

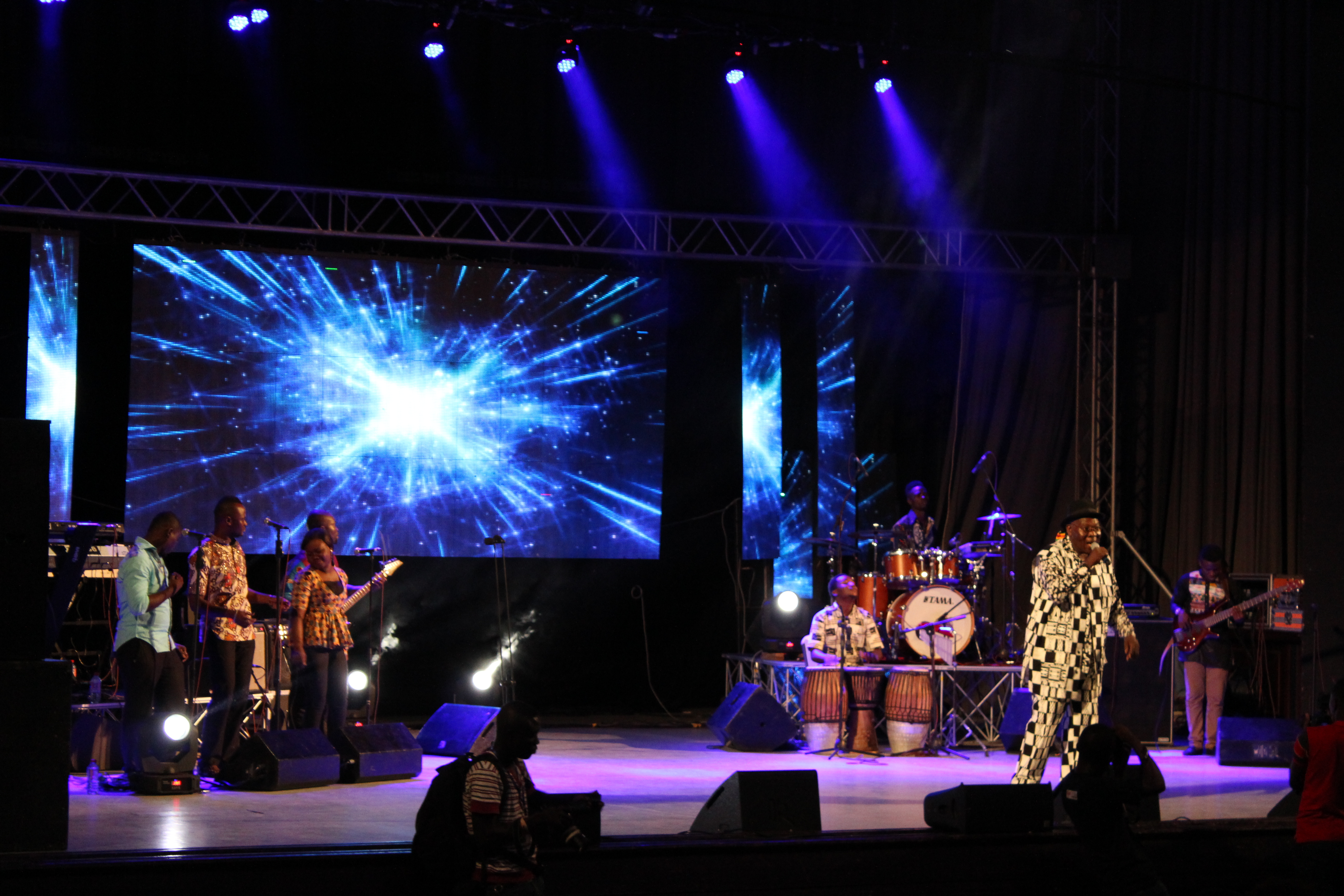
- Paapa Yankson at MOGO Festival

Background information
- Also known as: Paapa Yankson
- Born: Benjamin Paapa Kofi Yankson; 22 June 1944; Winneba, Ghana
- Died: 21 July 2017 (aged 73) Dansoman, Accra, Ghana
- Genres: Highlife
- Years active: 1970s–2017
- Formerly of: Western Diamonds; Golden Nuggets

Benjamin Paapa Kofi Yankson, known as Paapa Yankson (22 June 1944 – 21 July 2017) was a Ghanaian highlife singer, songwriter, and producer. He recorded two dozen albums during his career; his hit songs included "Wiase Mu Nsem", "Show Your Love", "Wo Yere Anaa Wo Maame", and "Tena Menkyen". He won multiple awards, including Best Composition for his song "Yaaba" at the 1997 Konkomba Awards. He was a recipient of the Grand Medal of Ghana for his contribution to Ghanaian music.

== Early life and education ==
Benjamin Paapa Kofi Yankson was born on 22 June 1944 at Winneba in the Central Region of Ghana. He was born into a musical family with his father, Benjamin Akono Yankson, being a trumpeter with the Apam Brass Band, and his mother Akua Doma, a singer in the Christ Little Band of the Methodist Church. He attended Takoradi Methodist School for his primary education and proceeded to Ahantaman Secondary Commercial School, from which he graduated with a certificate in stenography. Throughout his early life, he had the desire to be a musician and would regularly sing along with his mother whenever she sung. His parents, though, wanted him to go into business.

== Working life ==
After graduating from commercial school, Yankson was employed at Kingsway Chemist as a stenographer. Five years later he became a stenographer for the African Timber and Plywood Company, a subsidiary of the United African Company (UAC), at Samreboi. The company had a workers' band — the Big Sound Band — which performed regularly after work. Yankson was the lead singer of the band during his four years with the company.

== Music career ==
In the 1970s, C. K. Mann, the leader of the regional band The Carousel Seven, impressed upon the band's owner, Anis Mubarak, to sign Yankson to his band. Mann had seen Yankson perform during Yankson's mother's funeral and was impressed by his talent. Yankson accepted the offer.

In 1975 he enrolled at the National Academy of Music at Winneba and graduated with a diploma in music. From 1982 to 1991 he worked as a music organizer at the Garrisons Education Unit of Burma Camp in Accra. In 1991, businessman Ebo Coker signed Yankson to his band Western Diamonds, after which he relocated to Takoradi where the band was based. Yankson left the band in 1993 after a successful stint and joined the Obuasi-based band Golden Nuggets. His move to Obuasi was influenced by the then-CEO of Ashanti Goldfields Corporation, Sam Jonah. After a while the band was moved to Accra, and in 1995 Yankson broke away and went solo.

=== Popular songs ===
Paapa Yankson recorded two dozen albums during his career. His hit songs included "Wiase Mu Nsem", "Show Your Love", "Wo Yere Anaa Wo Maame", and "Tena Menkyen", the latter recorded with Paulina Oduro. In 1997 he composed "Yaaba", which won Best Composition at the Komkomba Awards.

=== Tours ===
Yankson taught and performed in many countries across the world, including the United States, Canada, Belgium, United Kingdom, Germany, and Holland.

== Awards ==
Yankson was awarded the Grand Medal of Ghana during the 2006 National Honours and Awards Ceremony by President John Agyekum Kufour, in recognition of his contribution to Ghanaian music. He was among the first recipients of this award after the ceremony was revamped in 2006. He also won the Lifetime Achievement Award at the 2017 Vodafone Ghana Music Awards.

== Final years ==
In 2016 Yankson grew progressively weaker and was unable to walk. He performed in a wheelchair at the Exclusive Men of The Year Awards in June and at the Bottles & Bands Festival 2016 in November.

On 21 July 2017, his family announced his death. It was reported that he had died in his sleep on Friday at his home in Dansoman in Accra.

Paapa Yankson has died at the age of 73, after a prolonged illness, family sources have disclosed.
