= Atumpan =

Atumpan may refer to:

- Atumpan (drum), an Ashanti talking drum
- Atumpan (singer), a Ghanaian afrobeat and dancehall singer
