= Kete drums =

Traditional Akan drums

Kete drums are a group of traditional drums that form the core of the Kete ensemble, one of the royal musical traditions of the Akan people in Ghana. The ensemble is closely linked with chieftaincy, especially among the Asante, and is performed during important state ceremonies, festivals, instoolment, and royal durbars. Kete music and dance is also taught in schools and universities in Ghana.

== Etymology ==
In Akan society, the term Kete is used to describe the ensemble; its music or dance performed alongside. Kete does not only refer to the drums but also the complete musical tradition that includes drumming, dancing and the ceremonial performance.

== History ==
The Kete tradition developed among the Akan people, particularly the Asante Kingdom. Historical accounts collected by scholars show that the ensemble became closely associated with the royal court and the institution of chieftaincy. However traditional oral histories offer different explanations for its origin, but there is no single verified account accepted by historians. Because of this, scholars generally present these traditions as oral history rather than historical fact.

Early written descriptions of Kete appeared in the works of Robert Sutherland Rattray in the 1920s. Later, J.H. Kwabena Nketia and James Koetting provided detailed study of its musical structure, performance structure, and cultural importance.

== Description ==
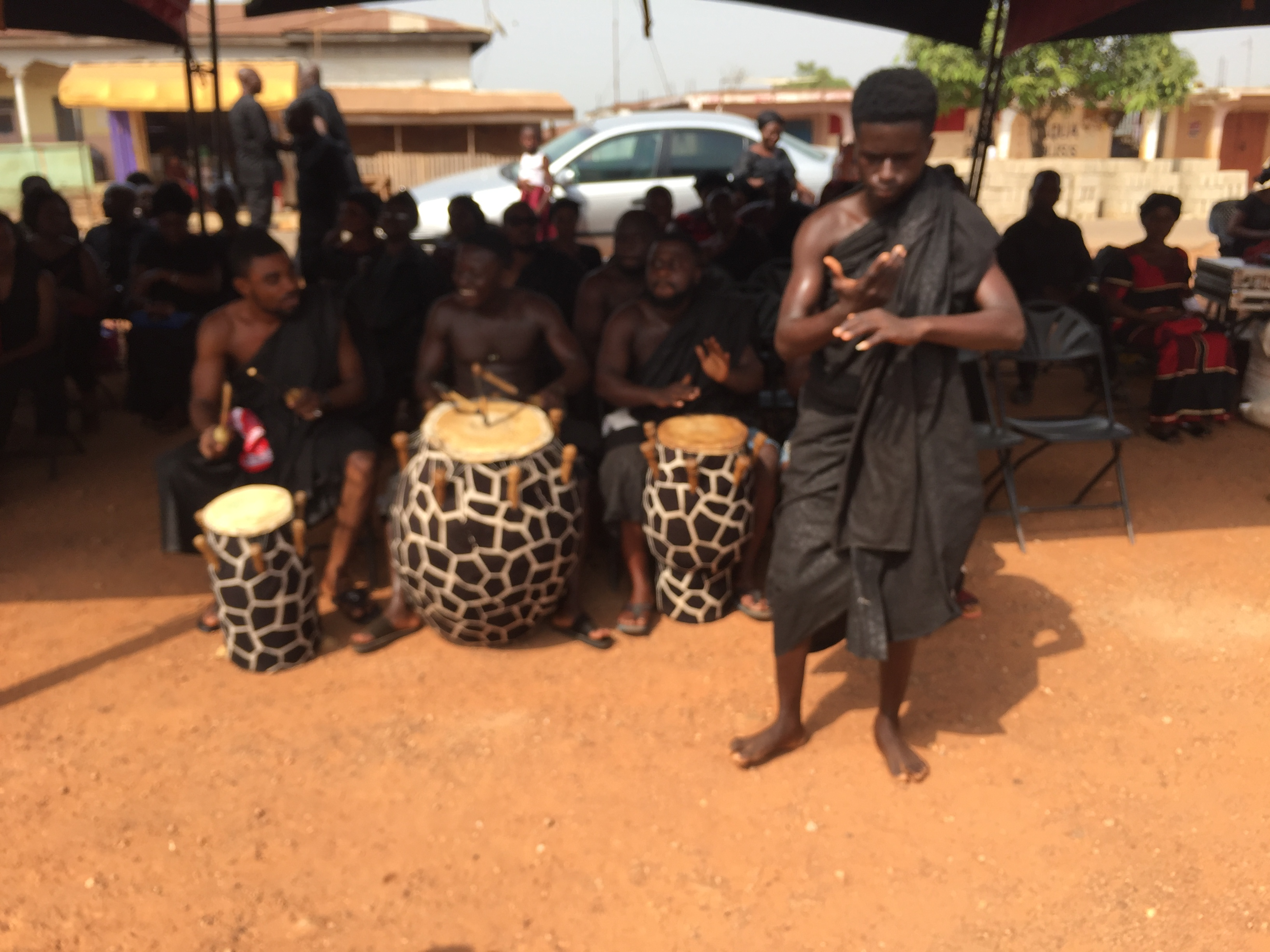
Kete Drum at a funeral

Kete drums are played as an ensemble rather than as individual instruments. Each drum has a specific musical role, and together they produce complex rhythmic patterns that accompany dance and ceremonial events. Most Kete drums are carved from hardwood and covered with animal skin. The shells are often decorated with distinctive red and black checkered cloth or plain pattern, colours traditionally associated with Akan funerals and royal ceremonies.

== Instruments of the Kete Ensemble ==
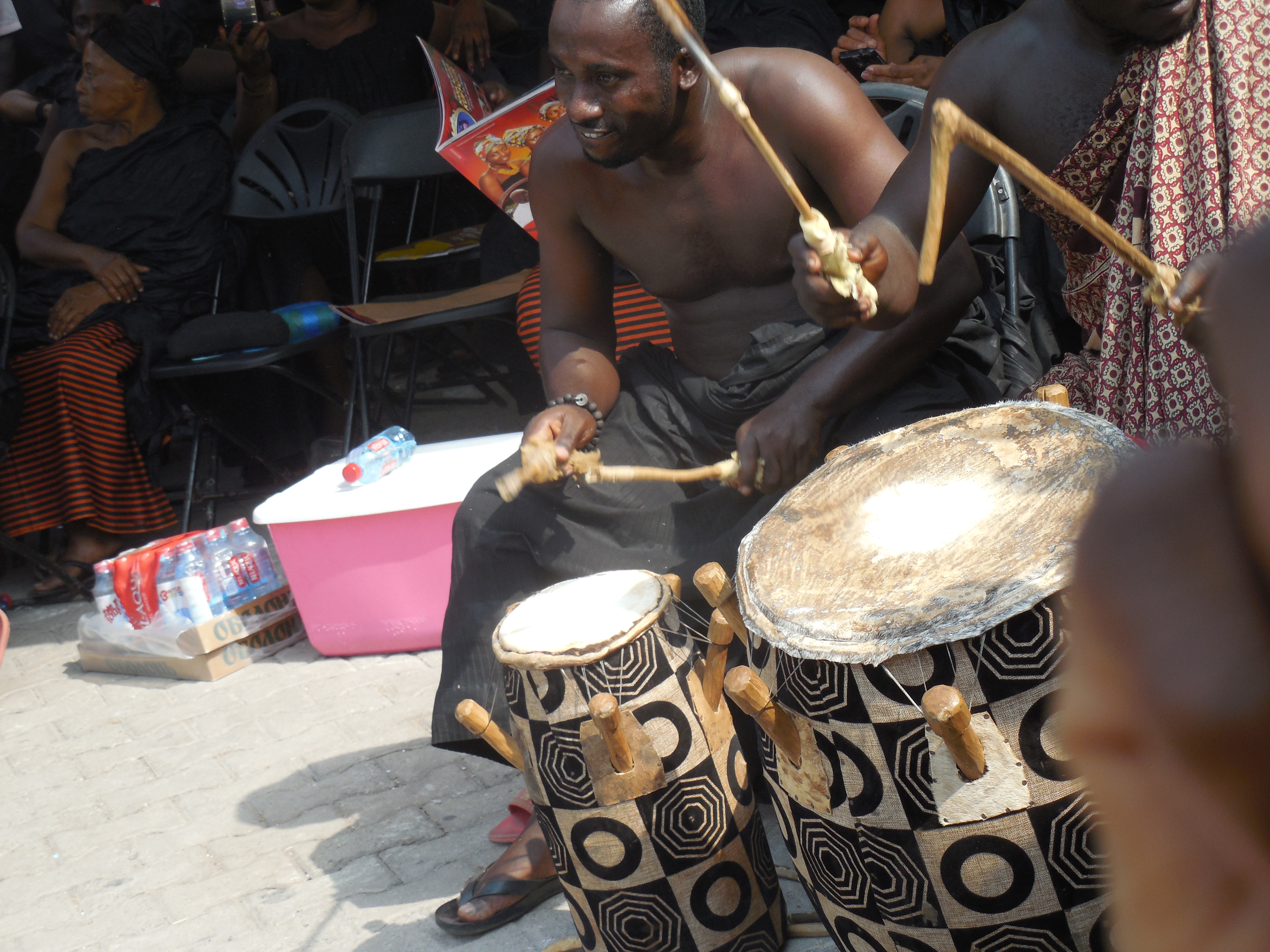
Kete drum

Although the exact composition may differ slightly between communities, a complete Kete ensemble commonly includes:

- Kwadum - the lead or master drum.
- Apentemma - a single-headed hand drum.
- Petia - a small stick drum.
- Aburukuwa - a supportingstick drum.
- Donno - an hourglass-shaped talking drum.
- Dawuro - an iron bell that provides the time pattern.
- Ntorowa - a gourd rattle used as an accompanying instrument.

Older traditions also included wind instruments and singing, although many modern performances focus mainly on the percussion ensemble.

== Construction ==
Most Kete drums are made from single hollowed piece of hardwood. The drum heads are made from animal hide and are stretched tightly across the shell. Depending on the drum, tension is maintained using wooden pegs, leather thongs, or rope systems. The drums vary in size according to their musical function within the ensemble.

== Performance ==
Kete performances are highly organized. Every drum has a specific rhythm role, while the master drum directs the ensemble and communicates with dancers through changing rhythmic patterns. the drums are played with either the hands or sticks, depending on the instrument. the ensemble follows established performance structure, and different pieces are performed for different ceremonial occasions.
