= Dawuro =

Hand-held bell used in Ghana

Dawuro is a traditional hand-held bell used in Ghana, particularly among the Akan people. It is an idiophone, meaning it produces sound through the vibration of its own body rather than the strings or a stretched membrane. The Instrument is commonly made of forged iron and is stuck with a metal or wooden beater to produce a bright, penetrating sound. It plays an important role in the traditional music, religious practices, festivals, royal ceremonies and community communication.

Although the Dawuro is best known in the Akan communities, similar forged bells are found among other ethnic groups in West Africa, where they serve musical, ceremonial, and communicative purposes.

== Etymology ==
The word Dawuro comes from the Akan language and generally refers to a bell used for signalling, announcing events, and accompanying music, for communication, playing the instrument is referred as Dawuro bɔ in Twi language. Historically, the instrument has been used to attract attention during public gatherings, festivals, and traditional ceremonies.

== Description ==
Dawuro is usually made from a single piece of forged iron shaped into a hollow bell with an opening at one end. Most Dawuro instruments are single bells, although double bells are also found in some musical traditions across West Africa. The instrument does not have any membrane. Instead, sound is produced when the metal body vibrates after being struck with a beater. Its sharp tone allows it to be heard over long distances and above the sounds of drums and other instruments.

The size and shape of the Dawuro vary depending on the community, the blacksmith who makes it, and its intended purpose.

The Dawuro has a very unusual shape. It is long and narrow, and can be described as trough-shaped, tube-shaped, or even banana-shaped with long slit running along its length. Although it does not have the traditional bell shape, it is still classified as a bell because the edges or rims of the slit produce the sound when struck. The instrument is played using an iron rod, which serves as the beater.

== Construction ==
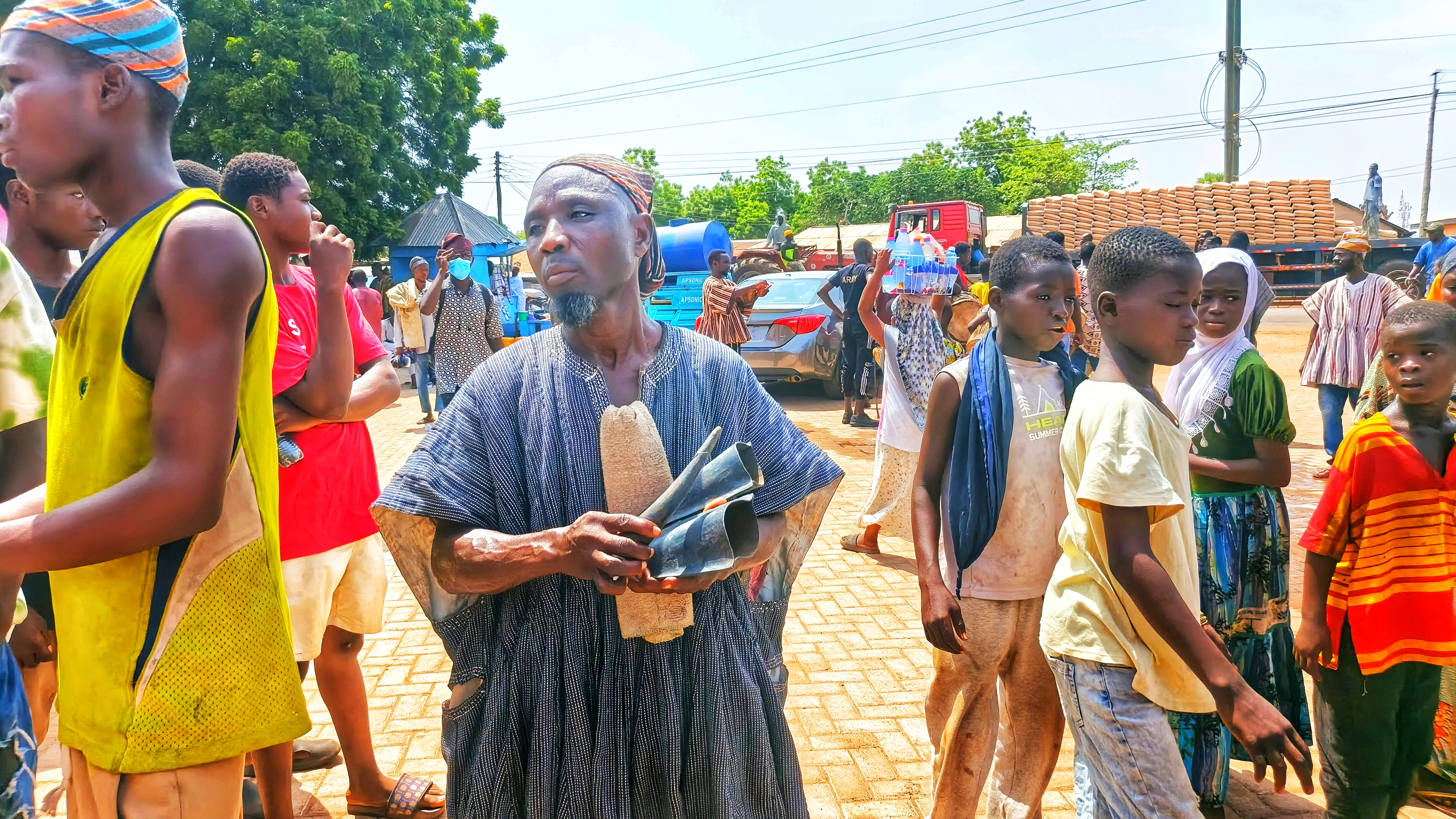
Dawuro

Traditional Dawuro bells are handcrafted by blacksmiths using iron or steel. the process generally involves:

- Heating the metal in a forge.
- Hammering it into shape.
- Joining the edges through forge welding.
- Forming the handle or grip.
- Finishing and polishing the surface.

The quality of the metal and the craftsmanship influence the instrument's tone, durability, and resonance.

== Playing technique ==
It is played by holding it in one hand while striking its outer surface with a metal rod or wooden stick held in the other hand. Different striking patterns produce rhythmic signals that complement drumming and dancing. Experienced players can create distinctive rhythmic phrases that help lead an ensemble or communicates specific ceremonial cues.

== Musical role ==
The Dawuro serves several musical functions in traditional Ghanaian ensembles. It often:

- Keeps a steady timeline pattern
- Marks the tempo for other musicians
- provides rhythmic accents
- signals transitions during performances.

It is often regarded as one of the guiding instruments in an ensemble because of its clear sound.

== Cultural significance ==
The Dawuro instrument has long been associated with social, cultural and religious life in Ghana. It is commonly used during:

- traditional festivals
- Chieftaincy ceremonies
- Funerals
- Naming ceremonies
- community meetings
- traditional worship
- cultural performances

In some communities, the Dawuro is used to announce important events or summon people to gather.

== Use in traditional ensembles ==
Dawuro appears in several Ghanaian musical traditions, including Akan drumming ensembles. Depending on the origin and performance style, it may accompany instruments such as Atumpan, Fontomfrom, Kete Drums, Apentemma, and other percussion instruments.

Its primary role is not usually melodic but rhythmic, providing consistent reference to performers.

The Dawuro (bell) is one of the most important instruments in many African drum ensembles. Its primary role is to provide a steady rhythmic pulse that helps drummers, dancers and other instrumentalists maintain a consistent tempo. The dawuro's (bell) distinctive sound establishes the timeline, which describes as a consistent point of reference by which the phrase structure of a song as well as the linear metrical organisation of phrases are guided. Similar to the concept of clave in Afro-Latin music, dawuro bell patterns serve as a foundation for understanding West African drumming, revealing important aspects of its meter, rhythmic feel and phrasing.

Kete is one of the African drum ensembles. The term Kete refers to the instruments, the music produced by those instruments, and the dance performed alongside it. Originally reserved for the Asante royal court, Kete is now performed at funerals, weddings, and cultural events. Its performance follows a strict dress code that reflects social hierarchy, with only chiefs and queen mothers allowed to dance wearing sandals.

The Dawuro (bell) is the foundation of Kete performance. Musicians and dancers depend on its rhythm to maintain coordination and structure. Even if the master drum makes a mistake, the performance may continue, but when the dawuro rhythm is disrupted, the entire ensemble can lose its direction.
