= Stephanie Benson =

UK-based Ghanaian singer

Stephanie Benson Akua Ohenewaa
- Born: 16 August 1967 (age 58); Kumasi
- Origin: Ashanti Region, Ghana
- Genres: Jazz
- Occupations: Singer, composer, performer, voice coach, businesswoman
- Instrument: Piano
- Years active: 1990–
- Label: Benson Entertainment Production
- Website: stephaniebensonlive.com

Stephanie Benson, also known as Princess Akua Ohenewaa Asieanem of Kokobin, is a UK-based Ghanaian international singer and performer who is rooted in music. In Ghana, she has been described as the queen of jazz. She runs a record label in London called Benson Music Ltd and Production. In 2015, she was a judge on the show Ghana's Vodafone Icons Diva. She has also been involved in charitable initiatives both inside and outside Ghana.She has performed at a number of events including the British royal family and has been described as "one of the most amazing performers".

== Early life ==
Stephanie Benson was born in Ghana to royal Parents, a pharmaceutical millionaire and his fourth wife named Queen Nana Boahemah II who had seventeen children. Her musical career began at the age of three when she started learning how to play the piano. She added the violin and cello when she was enrolled at the National Academy of Music at the age of eight in the year 1975. She became interested in playing the piano after her father often played the instrument to her before bedtime.

After her father's death in 1981 when she was fourteen, she moved to London, England to explore life in a different part of the world. During her stay in, she channeled her energy into playing the piano under the watchful eye of her uncle, and later got a residency singing and playing in one of the famous nightclubs called Strange Fellows nightclub in London, UK.

== Career ==
During one of Benson's usual shows in the London nightclub, she was spotted by Pete Waterman, owner of PWL, who offered her a contract with his label. The deal led her to record and release her first single, "Now is the Time", placing her in the top 20 on UK dance charts. Benson went on a promotional tour across Europe until her contract with PWL came to an end. She then started writing and collaborating with artists including Stevie Wonder, Wayne Vaughn (Earth Wind and Fire), Rob Davis (Kylie Minogue), Terry Britton (Tina Turner), Andy Hill (Bucks Fizz) and Danny Schogger (Celine Dion).

=== Music school ===
In a bid to groom potential stars of Ghanaian talent in all fields of the industry, in April 2013, she announced the establishment of a music school named the Benson Entertainment Production Institute (BEPI) in Accra. BEPI is intended to promote professional international standards relating to stage performances and rehearsals, theatre shows, TV shows and musical concerts, and training, as well as to serve commercial purposes. The first performance of students from BEPI was in 2014 at +233 Jazz Bar and Grill in Accra.

=== Performances for Royal family ===
Since taking on music commercially, Benson has entertained celebrities and important personalities at public and private events including the British royal household and Prince Charles, who said upon hearing her sing the first time, "You are one of the most amazing performers I've ever seen." Benson has performed at events hosted by the British royals including Princess Anne, and reportedly exceeded her 15-minute allotted performance time for Prince Charles to approximately an hour because he enjoyed her act.

She received another invitation to sing for Prince William before his wedding to Kate Middleton on 29 April 2011.

== Personal life ==
=== Family ===
Benson is an older sister of Ghanaian highlife singer, Akosua Agyapong. She is married to John, and together they have five children. The couple own a chocolate shop located in The Pantiles, Royal Tunbridge Wells, Kent.

On 22 April 2014 Benson was involved in a car accident. Following this, she released a gospel single titled "My Prayer" as a way of showing appreciation and gratitude to God for saving her from the accident.

=== Surviving breast cancer ===
On 29 October 2015, Benson underwent surgery for breast cancer, a situation she described as shocking when she was diagnosed, revealing that she had lost her grandmother, mother and other relatives to the disease. Following her survival, she trained to do a mountain walk in France on 1 September 2016 with the Dutch "Singing for your Life" team to raise funds towards a cancer research and mobile mammogram unit for Ghana, and support for the Dutch Cancer Society.

Benson has publicly talked about surviving breast cancer after undergoing a total of 28 hours of surgery within three days.

On 19 March 2016, at Labadi Beach Hotel's Omanye Hall in Accra, she held a women's gathering centered on her fight against breast cancer with the aim of encouraging and strengthening women amidst music and words of exhortation. She released her song titled "Dear Lord" at this event, which was attended by notable women including Nana Ama McBrown, Michelle McKinney-Hammond as well as singers Akosua Agyapong, Irene Logan, Yaa Yaa and Becca.

== Brand ambassador ==
In October 2018, 3Foundation made her a brand ambassador to lead a breast cancer awareness campaign where she helped raised funds to support women affected by breast cancer to undergo reconstructive surgeries. In 2023, Stephanie Benson was made the Global Peace Ambassador for UK and Ghana and also received the United Nations Humanitarian Award and Leadership Award from President Biden.

== Discography ==
Since moving back to Ghana, Benson has released a number of albums, including Different Kind of Heaven, What are you doing with your life and Friend all in 2015, as well as Dear Lord and I am worth it in 2016.
