= C. K. Mann =

Ghanaian highlife musician

Charles Kofi Mann
- Also known as: C. K. Mann
- Born: Charles Kofi Amankwaa Mann; 1936; Cape Coast
- Died: March 20, 2018 (aged 81–82) Takoradi
- Genres: Highlife
- Years active: 1960–2013
- Formerly of: The Carousel 7

Charles Kofi Amankwaa Mann (1936 – March 20, 2018), known as C. K. Mann, was a Ghanaian highlife musician and producer. His music career spanned over four decades; he won multiple awards for his songs. He was awarded the Grand Medal of Ghana by John Agyekum Kufour in 2006.

== Life and career ==
C. K. Mann was born in 1936 in Cape Coast in the Central Region of Ghana. He worked briefly as a seaman before joining Moses Kweku Oppong's Kakaiku band.

After familiarizing himself with the Ghanaian music scene, he joined Ocean Strings and led the band until 1965. When the band was disbanded, he joined a newly formed band in Takoradi, The Carousel 7. He came to prominence in 1969 when he released his single "Edina Benya". It was he who impressed on the band's owner, Anis Mubarak, to sign Paapa Yankson to the group. Mann added Western musical instruments to Osode, the traditional music of Ghanaian fishermen rhythms.

Mann died at the Ghana Ports and Harbour Authority (GHAPOHA) hospital in Takoradi on March 20, 2018, after an unspecified disease intensified the previous December.

== Discography ==
Mann had several hit songs, including "Adwoa Yankey", "Asafo beesuon", "Obaa yaa aye me bone", "Kolomashie", "Dofo bi akyerew me", "Ankwasema dede", "Okwan tsentsen awar", "Aboa akonkoran", "Beebi a odo wo", "Tsie m'afotusem", "Ebusua ape adze aye me", "Yebeyi wo aye", and "Do me ma mondo wo bi". His last album, Wope Nye Ho was produced by West Gold Music Studio in Takoradi and released in 2013.

== Recognition ==
In 2006, Mann was awarded the Grand Medal of Ghana during the 2006 National Honours and Awards Ceremony by President John Agyekum Kufour in recognition of his contribution to Ghanaian music. He was among the first recipients of this award after the ceremony was revamped in 2006.

A street in Anaji (a suburb of Takoradi) has been named after Mann.

== See also ==
- List of African musicians
