= Moses Kweku Oppong =

Founder of Kakaiku band

Moses Kweku Oppong (2 October 1915 – 1986) was the founder of the band Kakaiku, which was created in 1954. He and his band were important parts of the highlife music genre, and is connected to other important musician like C. K. Mann.

Born in Aboso in the Western Region, he learned to play guitar as a child and started becoming a musician. Before the band became popular, he worked in various other jobs, including blacksmith, winch greaser and driver in the Aboso Goldfields.
