= Talking drum =

Hourglass-shaped West African drum

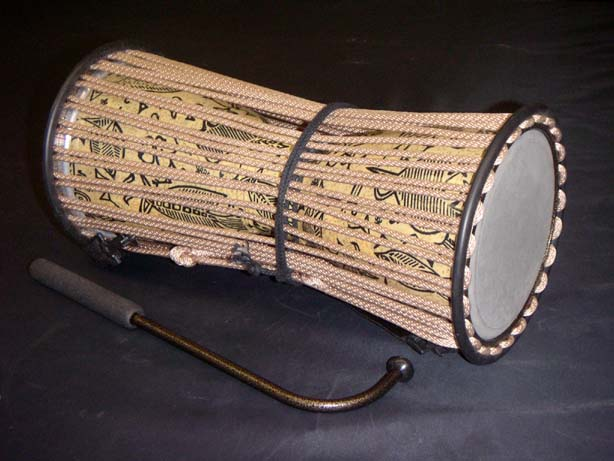

Percussion instrument
- Other names: Dondo, Odondo, Tamanin, Luca Cappacio, Lunna, Donno, Kalangu, Dan karbi, Igba, Doodo, Tama, Tamma, Gangan
- Classification: Percussion
- Hornbostel–Sachs classification: 211.242.11 (Individual double-skin hourglass-shaped drums, one skin used for playing)
- Developed: Antiquity

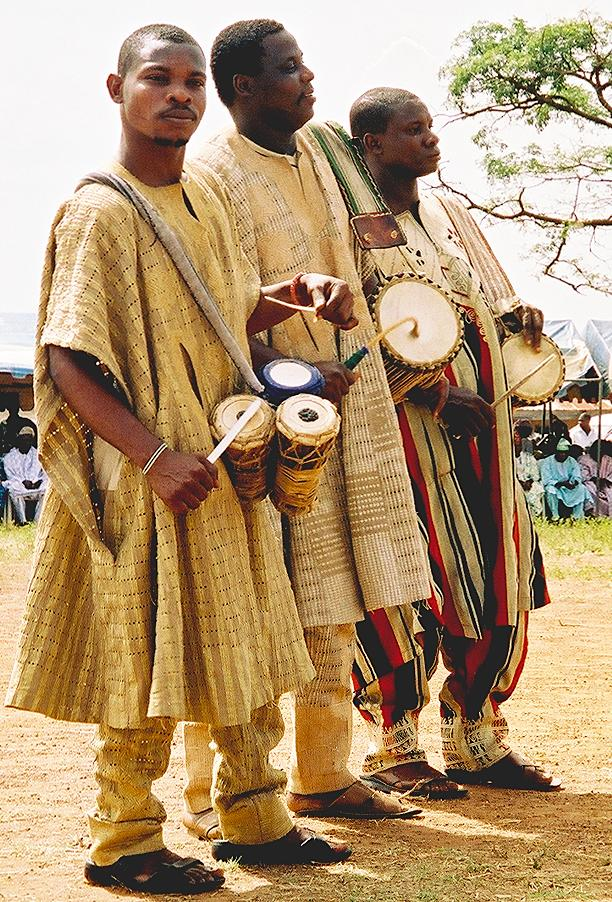
Yoruba drummers: The nearest holds omele ako and batá, the other two hold dùndúns.

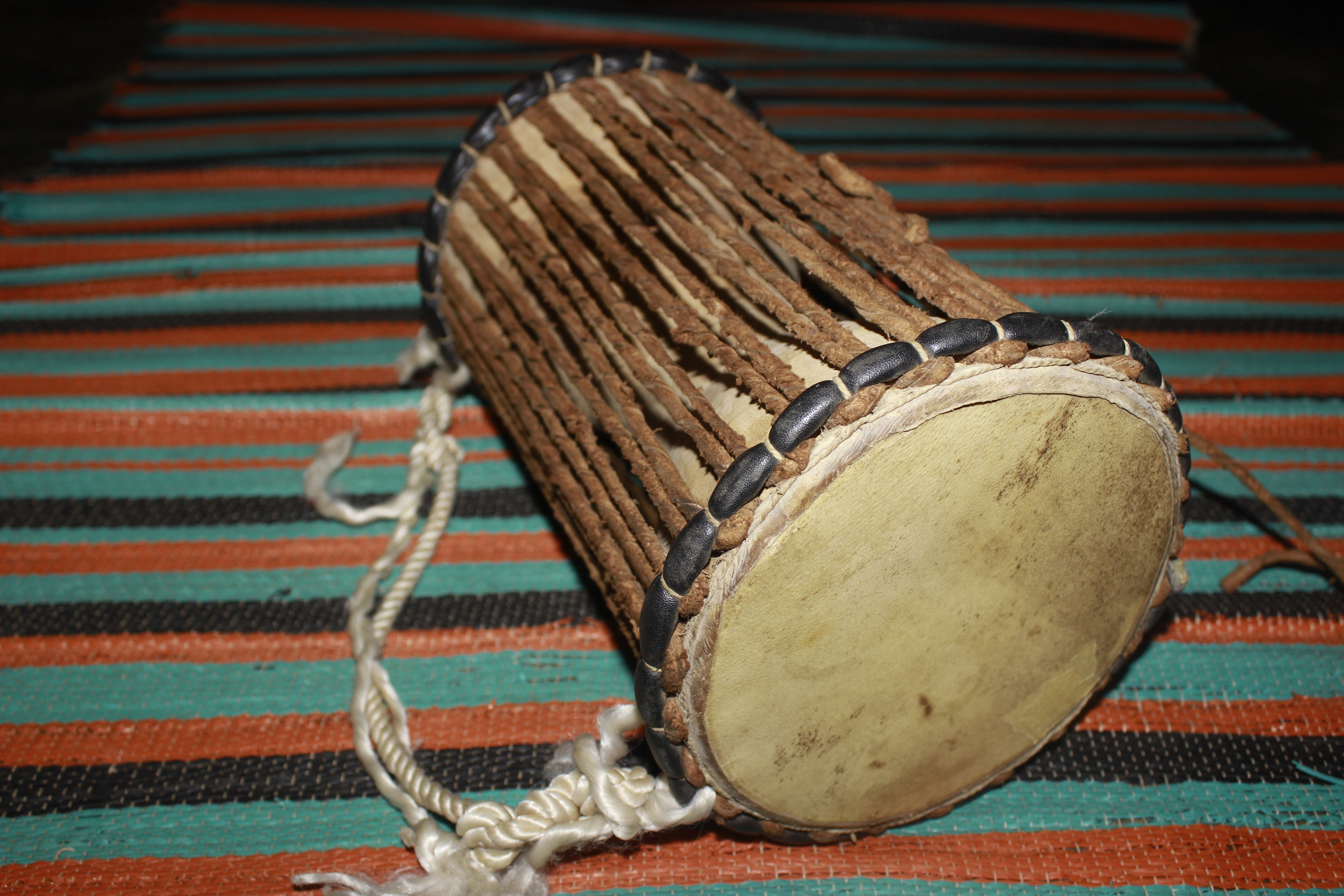
Gangan

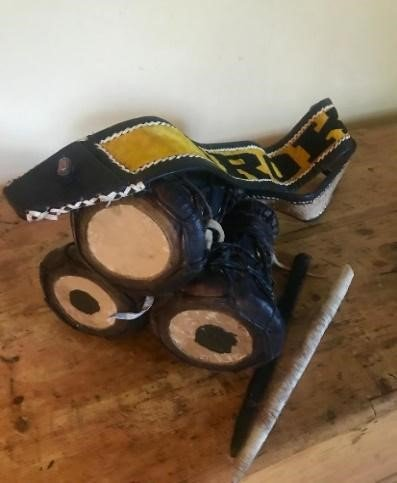
Batá

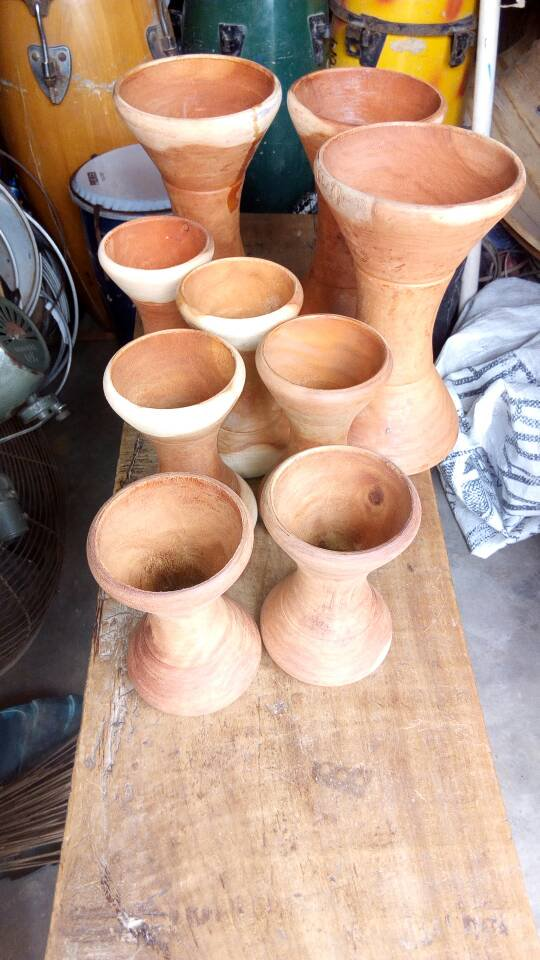
Wooden frames of talking drums

The talking drum is an hourglass-shaped drum from West Africa, which can be used as a form of speech surrogacy by regulating its pitch and rhythm to mimic the tone and prosody of human speech. It has two drumheads connected by leather tension cords. It is often played while being held under the arm. The player can change the pitch of the drum by tightening and loosening the cords between their arm and body.

Originating from the 18th century, talking drum players used tones to disseminate messages, such as news of ceremonies and commands, over 4–5-mile (6.4–8.0 km) distances.

A skilled player is able to play whole phrases. Most talking drums sound like a human humming depending on the way they are played.

Similar hourglass-shaped drums are found in Asia, but they are not used to mimic conversation, although the idakka is used to mimic vocal music.

Five varieties of dùndún pressure drums of the Yoruba and the atumpan and fontomfrom of the Asante (Ashanti) are especially notable. They send messages up to distances of 20 miles (32 km), where other drummers relay them, quickly spreading news.

== Names of talking drums by language or region ==
Language	Name
Akan languages (Fante, Twi, Baoule)	Dondo, Odondo
Bambara, Bozo, Dyula	Tamanin
Dagbani, Gurunsi, Moore	Lunna, Donno
Efik	Obodom
Fulani	Mbaggu, Baggel
Hausa	Kalangu, Dan Kar'bi
Songhai	Doodo
Serer, Wolof, Mandinka	Tama, Tamma
Yoruba	Dùndún, Gángan

== History ==
Hourglass-shaped talking drums are some of the oldest instruments used by West African griots and their history can be traced back to the Bono people, Yoruba people, the Ghana Empire and the Hausa people. The Yoruba people of south western Nigeria and Benin and the Dagomba of northern Ghana have both developed a highly sophisticated genre of griot music centering on the talking drum.

Many variants of the talking drums have evolved, with most of them having the same construction mentioned above. Many non-hourglass shapes showed up quickly and were given special names, such as the Dunan and the Fontomfrom. This construction is limited to within the contemporary borders of West Africa, with exceptions to this rule being northern Cameroon and western Chad, as well as areas that have shared populations belonging to groups predominant in their bordering West African countries, such as the Kanuri, Djerma, Fulani, and Hausa.

=== Serer people ===
In Senegalese and Gambian history, the tama (in the Serer language) was one of the musical instruments used in the Serer people's "Woong" tradition (the "dance performed by Serer boys yet to be circumcised" or the future circumcised, also known as the "Xaat" (in Serer). The tama drum has Serer religious connotations (which predates the Ghana Empire).

In the Xaat tradition, the tama makes up the fourth musical drum ensemble. The Serer drums played include: Perngel; Lamb; Qiin; and Tama.

When the rooster crows, the Xaat will rest and sleep until the moment of circumcision, if he has been judged to be able to dance to the Woong, surrounded by four tam-tam. The Perngel, the Lamb, the Qiin and the Tama.

— Henry Gravrand

From a historical perspective, the tama (just like the Serer junjung), was beaten by the griots of Senegambian kings on special occasions, such as during wars (a call for arms), when the kings wanted to address their subjects, and on special circumstances in Serer country – a call for martyrdom, such as the mayhem at Tahompa (a 19th-century surprise attack) and the Battle of Naoudourou, where the defeated Serers (by the Muslim-marabouts of Senegambia), committed suicide rather than be conquered by the Muslim forces or forced to submit to Islam. Suicide is permitted in Serer religion only if it satisfies the Serer principle of Jom (see Serer religion). The word "Jom" means "honour" in the Serer language.

=== Yoruba people ===
==== Ayangalu ====
Ayangalu is believed to have been the first Yoruba drummer. Upon his death he was deified, and so now he is counted among the ranks of the Orishas. It is believed by followers of the Yoruba religion that he is the patron spirit of all drummers, and that in the guise of a muse he inspires the drummers to play well. The word "Ayan" means drummer in the Yoruba language. This is why some Yoruba family names contain the prefix Ayan, such as Ayanbisi, Ayangbade, Ayantunde, Ayanwande etc. This prefix marks its bearers out as hereditary custodians of the mysteries of Ayangalu.

In the 20th century, the talking drum became a part of popular music in West Africa. It is used in playing Mbalax music of Senegal and in Fuji and Jùjú music of Nigeria (where it is known as a dùndún, not to be confused with the dundun bass drum of the Mandé peoples).

The talking drum is also used in ceremonial functions and events like weddings, burial ceremonies, and private functions. Most importantly, it is commonly used by African bands as part of their musical instruments.

== Playing technique ==
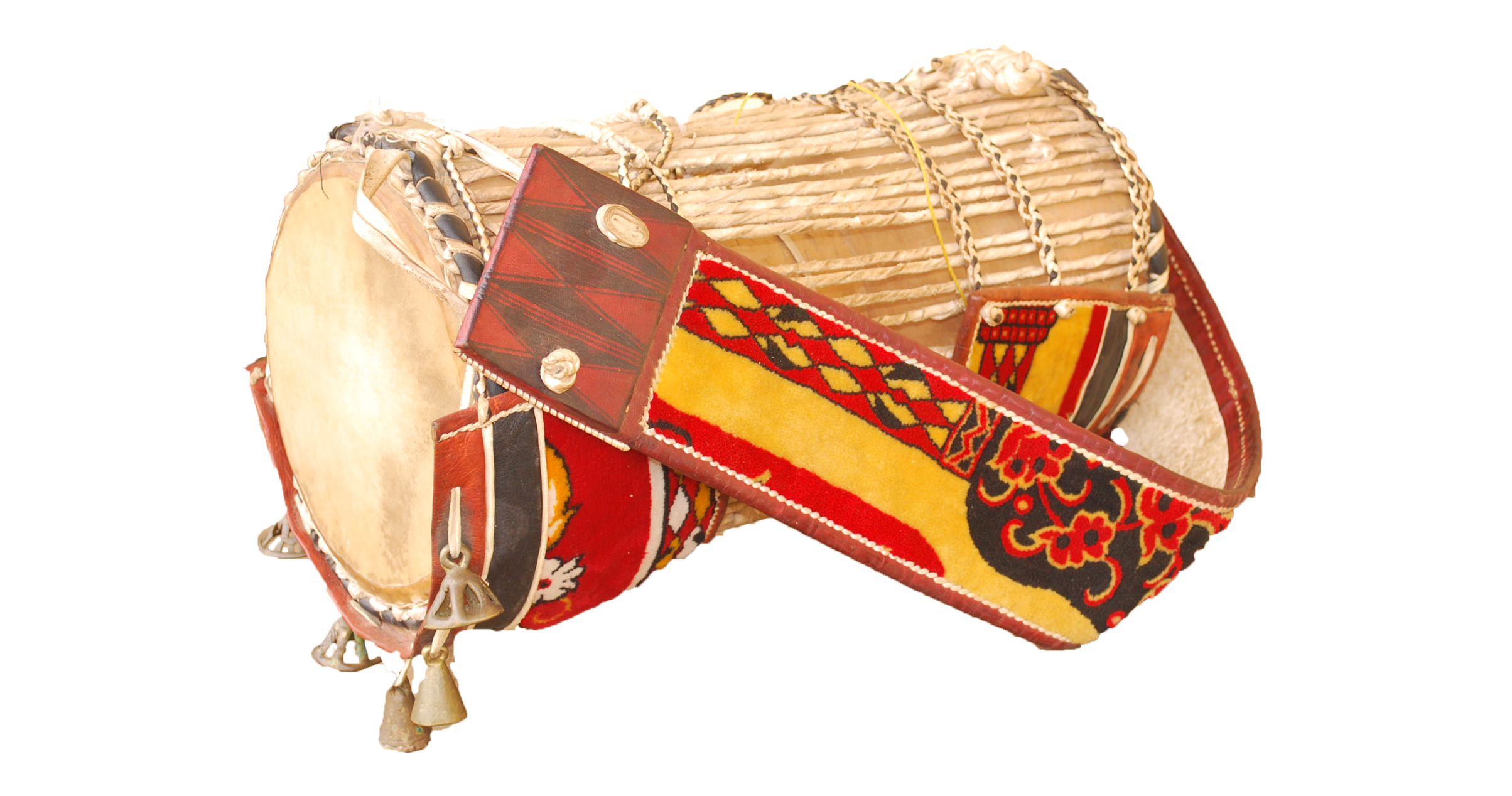
Iya Ilu, Yoruba talking drum.

The pitch of the drum is varied to mimic the tone patterns of speech. This is done by varying the tension placed on the drumhead: the opposing drum heads are connected by a common tension cord. The waist of the drum is held between the player's arm and ribs, so that when squeezed the drumhead is tightened, producing a higher note than when it is in its relaxed state; the pitch can be changed during a single beat, producing a warbling note. The drum can thus capture the pitch, volume, and rhythm of human speech, though not the qualities of vowels or consonants.

The use of talking drums as a form of communication was noticed by Europeans in the first half of the 18th century. Detailed messages could be sent from one village to the next faster than could be carried by a person riding a horse. In the 19th century Roger T. Clarke, a missionary, realised that "the signals represent the tones of the syllables of conventional phrases of a traditional and highly poetic character."

Many African languages are tonal; that is, the pitch is important in determining the meaning of a particular word. The Yoruba language, for instance, has three principal tones, low, medium, and high, analogous to tonic sol-fa notes do, re, and mi; different inflections of the three tones are then used to convey different messages. The same plan of three principal tones and their inflections also applies to how the drum talks in Yoruba music and culture. However, the Serer language and its relative Senegambian languages are not tonal, unlike almost all other Niger-Congo languages.

The problem was how to communicate complex messages without the use of vowels or consonants but simply using tone. An English emigrant to Africa, John F. Carrington, in his 1949 book The Talking Drums of Africa, explained how African drummers were able to communicate complex messages over vast distances. Using low tones referred to as male and higher female tones, the drummer communicates through the phrases and pauses, which can travel upwards of 4–5 miles. The process may take eight times longer than communicating a normal sentence but was effective for telling neighboring villages of possible attacks or ceremonies. He found that to each short word that was beaten on the drums, an extra phrase was added, which would be redundant in speech but provided context to the core drum signal.

=== Example ===
The message "Come back home" might be translated by the drummers as: "Make your feet come back the way they went, make your legs come back the way they went, plant your feet and your legs below, in the village which belongs to us".

Single words would be translated into phrases. For example, "Moon" would be played as "the Moon looks towards Earth", and "war" as "war which causes attention to ambushes".

The extra phrases provide a context in which to make sense of the basic message or drum beats. These phrases could not be randomized, when learning to play the drum students were taught the particular phrase that coincided with each word. This reason alone made learning to talk in drum language difficult and few were willing to take the time to do so. The extra drum beats reduce the ambiguity of the meaning. Ironically, when the West understood the mechanism of the drums, they had already begun to be used less often in Africa. Also, words often lost their meaning. In an interview with Carrington, he explained that when words that are not used often, the phrases that correspond to them are forgotten. When given the beat for young girl, the drummers thought the phrase played was in fact the one for fishing nets.

As emphasized by Finnegan, the messages sent via drums were not confined to utilitarian messages. Drum languages could also be used for specifically literary forms, for proverbs, panegyrics, historical poems, dirges, and in some cultures practically any kind of poetry. The ritualized forms and the drum names of particular individuals constituted a type of oral literature. Among some peoples such as the Ashanti or the Yoruba, drum language and literature were very highly developed. In these cultures, drumming tended to be a specialized and often hereditary activity, and expert drummers with a mastery of the accepted vocabulary of drum language and literature were often attached to a king's court.

== Details of design ==
The dimensions of the drums differ between ethnic groups, but all follow the same basic design.

The Tama of the Serer, Wolof and Mandinka peoples is typified by its smaller dimensions, having a total drum length typical of 13 cm (5.1 in) with a 7 cm (2.8 in) drum head diameter. This produces a much higher pitched tone than other talking drums of the same construction.

The Yoruba and Dagomba peoples, on the other hand, have some of the largest talking drums in their Lunna and Dùndún ensembles, with a length typical of 23–38 cm (9.1–15.0 in) and a drum head diameter of between 10 and 18 cm (3.9 and 7.1 in). In Yoruba talking-drum ensembles, these large drums are used alongside smaller ones similar to the Tama, called Gangan in Yoruba language.

== Playing styles ==
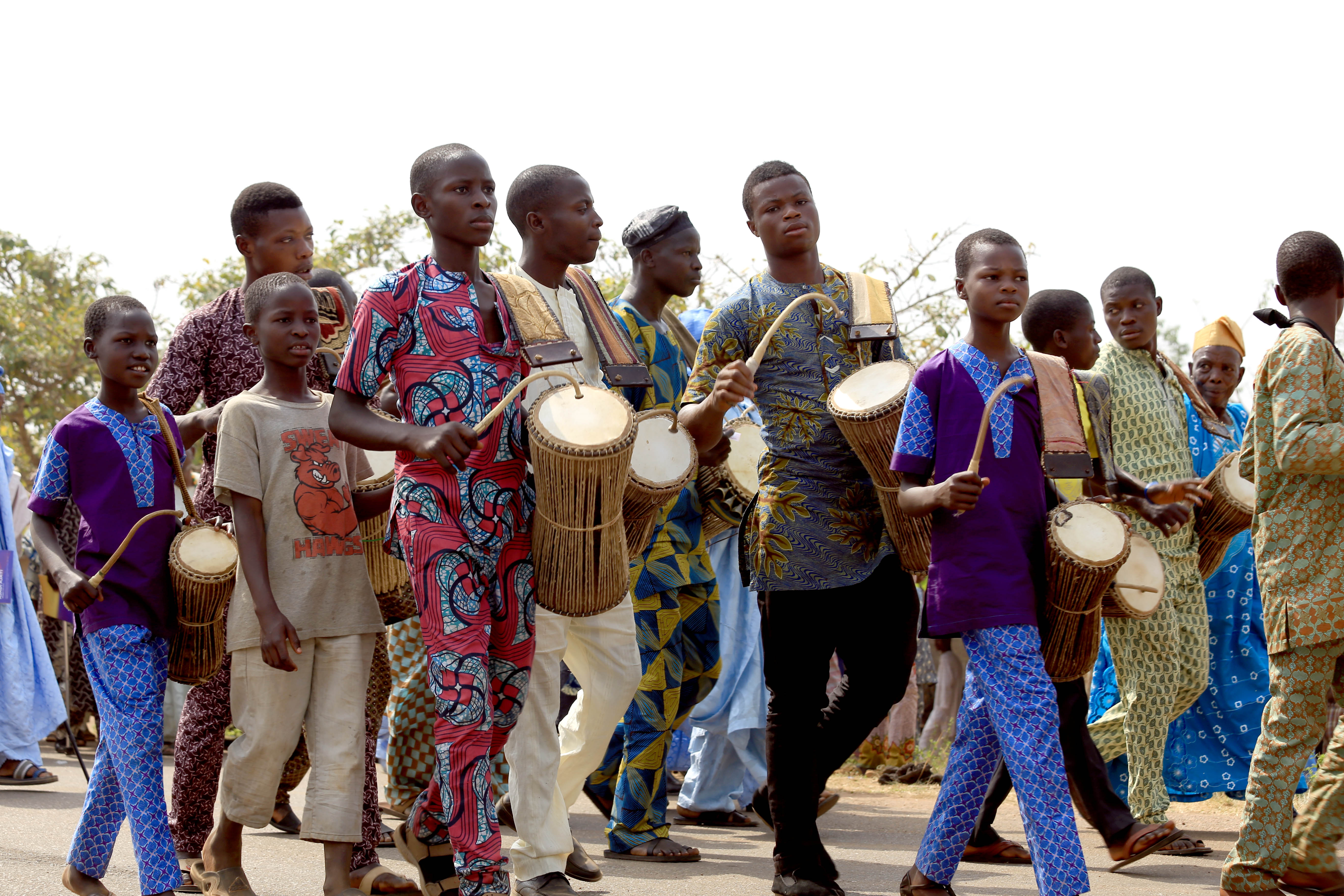
Drummers on parade

Playing styles are closely linked with the drum's construction and the tonal qualities of each language. A clear difference in playing styles can be heard between areas with predominantly Fulani and Mande-speaking populations and traditionally non-Mande areas further east.

The predominant style of playing in areas further west such as Senegal, Gambia, western Mali, and Guinea is characterized by rapid rolls and short bursts of sound between the stick holding hand and accompanying free hand, and correlates with the various pitch accent and non-tonal languages heard in this area. This is a punctuation style is typically heard in the popular Mbalax genre of Senegal.

From eastern Mali, Burkina Faso and Ghana, towards Niger, western-Chad, and Nigeria, with the exceptions of areas with Fulani and Mande-speaking majorities, the playing style of the talking drum is centered on producing long and sustained notes by hitting the drum head with the stick-holding hand and the accompanying free hand used to dampen and change tones immediately after being hit. This produces a rubbery sounding texture to its playing, which mimics the heavy and complex tones used in languages from this area (see Niger–Congo tonal language chart). This characteristic style can be clearly heard in the popular music of this area, particularly in those where the talking drum is the lead instrument, such as Fuji music of the Yoruba of Nigeria.

In some ethnic groups, each individual was given a "drum name" which could be used direct messages to specific individuals. Examples from among the Bulu of Cameroon are "Even if you dress up finely, love is the only thing" or "The giant wood rat has no child, the house rat has no child". Talking drum players sent messages by drumming the recipient's name, followed by the sender's name and the message.

== See also ==
- Drum (communication)
- Whistling languages, tonal transpositions of spoken languages.

== Bibliography ==
- (in French) Gravrand, Henry, "La civilisation seereer – Pangool, vol. 2, Les Nouvelles Editions Africaines du Senegal, 1990, pp. 40, 48–49, ISBN 2723610551.
- (in French) Gravrand, Henry, "L'Heritage spirituel Sereer: Valeur traditionelle d'hier, d'aujourd'hui et de demain", in Ethiopiques, numéro 31, révue socialiste de culture négro-Africaine, 3e trimestre 1982 (retrieved 7 May 2012)
- (in English) Joof, Alhaji Alieu Ebrima Cham, "Senegambia, the land of our heritage" (1995)
- (in French) Sarr, Alioune, "Histoire du Sine-Saloum" (Sénégal), Introduction, bibliographie et notes par Charles Becker, Bulletin de l'Institut Fondamental d'Afrique Noire, Tome 46, Serie B, n° 3–4, 1986–1987, p. 42.
- "Drum Telegraphy". TIME, 21 September 1942. Online version accessed 7 November 2006.
