= J. H. Kwabena Nketia =

Ghanaian ethnomusicologist and composer (1921–2019)

J. H. Kwabena Nketia FGA GM MSG
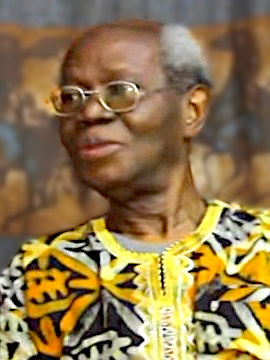
- Nketia in 2015
- Born: Joseph Hanson Kwabena Nketia; 22 June 1921; Mampong, Gold Coast
- Died: 13 March 2019 (aged 97); Accra, Ghana
- Children: Akosua Adoma Perbi

Academic background
- Education: Presbyterian Training College, Akropong: SOAS University of London; Trinity College of Music; Birkbeck, University of London

Academic work
- Discipline: African music
- Institutions: University of Ghana; UCLA; University of Pittsburgh
- Notable works: Music of Africa (1974)

Joseph Hanson Kwabena Nketia FGA GM MSG (22 June 1921 – 13 March 2019) was a Ghanaian ethnomusicologist and composer. Considered Africa's premier musicologist, during his lifetime, he was called a "living legend" and "easily the most published and best known authority on African music and aesthetics in the world", with more than 200 publications and 80 musical compositions to his credit.

== Early life and education ==
Born in 1921 in Mampong, Gold Coast (modern Ghana), J. H. Kwabena Nketia was his parents' only child. He first trained as a teacher at the Presbyterian Training College, Akropong.

On a government scholarship, he went to Britain at the age of 23 to attend the University of London from 1944 to 1949, beginning with two years of study in linguistics at the School of Oriental and African Studies. In 1949, he began three years' study at Birkbeck College, University of London, and Trinity College of Music, London, obtaining a B.A. degree. In 1958 a Rockefeller Fellowship enabled him to go to the United States, where he attended Columbia University (studying with Henry Cowell), the Juilliard School, and Northwestern University, studying musicology and composition.

== Career ==
Nketia was a professor of music at UCLA and the University of Pittsburgh, and lectured in many prestigious universities worldwide, including Harvard University, Stanford University, University of Michigan, City University London, the University of Brisbane in Australia, the University of Kansas, Lawrence, and the China Conservatory of Music, Beijing. He was a professor of music at the University of Ghana, Legon, Accra, where he began teaching in 1952. He directed the International Centre for African Music and Dance (ICAMD). He taught at the Presbyterian Training College, Akropong, serving as the Acting Principal in 1952.

According to GhanaWeb: "His concept and interpretation of time and rhythmic patterns in Ghanaian and other African folk music were revolutionary, and became standard for researchers and scholars around the world." He introduced, for example, the use of the more readable 6/8 time signature in his compositions as an alternative to the use of duple (2/4) time with triplets that was used earlier by his mentor and teacher, Ephraim Amu. Although this practice undermined Amu's theory of a constant basic pulse in African music, and generated debate, Nketia pointed out that the constant use of triplets in a duple time signature was misleading. Many scholars nowadays have found his theory useful in transcribing African music.

He composed for both Western and African instruments, and wrote more than 200 publications, including his world-acclaimed The Music of Africa, which was translated into German, Italian, Chinese, and Japanese.

== Personal life ==
J. H. Kwabena Nketia's death, after a short illness, was confirmed on 13 March 2019 at Legon Hospital in Accra. The National Theatre of Ghana honoured him with a tribute performance of music, dance and drama on the eve of his burial, 3 May 2019. He was accorded a state funeral at the Forecourt of the State House on 6 May 2019 and buried at the new Military Cemetery at Burma Camp.

== Awards and honours ==
Nketia was honoured with many awards in Ghana, including the Companion of the Order of the Star of Ghana, the Grand Medal of the Government of Ghana (Civil Division), a DLitt (Honoris Causa) of the University of Ghana, the Ghana Book Award, ECRAG Special Honour Award (1987), Ghana Gospel Music Special Award (2003), and the ACRAG Flagstar Award (1993). He was a Member of Honour of the International Music Council.

Other international awards he received include the Cowell Award of the African Music Society; the ASCAP Deems Taylor Award, for The Music of Africa (1975); the IMC-UNESCO Prize for Distinguished Service to Music; the 1997 Prince Claus Award; and the Distinguished Africanist Award of the African Studies Association of the USA (2000).

In 2009, the Nketia Music Foundation was formed "to promote the conservation and development of Ghana’s Creative Legacy in contemporary contexts, and the use of the works of Emeritus Prof. J. H. Kwabena Nketia and other composers for the development and growth of music and culture".

On 27 February 2012, Goucher College presented "Tradition, Creation, and Life: A Celebration of Professor Joseph Hanson Kwabena Nketia and the Music of Ghana".

In June 2015, in commemoration of his 94th birthday, the Governing Council of the African University College of Communications (AUCC) held the official launch of the Kwabena Nketia Centre for Africana Studies.

Following his 96th birthday, a festival was held in celebration of his life and achievements at the Kwabena Nketia Centre for Africana Studies at the African University College of Communications, Adabraka-Accra, under the patronage of Ghana's President Nana Addo Dankwa Akufo-Addo, who paid tribute to Nketia as "one of the legends of the ages". Also in attendance were former President Jerry Rawlings with his wife Nana Konadu Agyeman Rawlings, and representatives from former President John Dramani Mahama and former President John Agyekum Kufuor. The Asantehene Osei Tutu II, in a speech read on his behalf at the festival on 27 September 2017, said: "Emeritus Prof. Nketia’s life symbolises the evolution of our nation in the 20th century. There are many parallels in his life's story, which mirrors the national endeavours in the country. A bridge between our indigenous culture and modern culture, non-literate and literate traditions, old and young artists, Ghana and Africa in the dissemination." The event was also to raise funds in order to collate, digitize Professor Nketia's "thousands of archival files and field notes on Ghanaian culture, history, language, arts, material culture".

== Selected publications ==
=== Books ===
- 1963 - African Music in Ghana. Northwestern University Press
- 1974 - The Music of Africa. W. W. Norton. ISBN 0-393-02177-7. ISBN 978-0-393-02177-6.
- 1978 - Amoma (in Twi), Ghana Publishing Corporation, 49pp.
- 2004 - African Art Music/The Creative Potential of African Art Music in Ghana. Companion booklet to ICAMD CD recordings (ICAMD - DMVI - ICAMD - DMV4). Accra: Afram Publications (Ghana) Ltd.
- 2005 - Ethnomusicology and African Music – Collected papers, Volume One: Modes of Inquiry and Interpretation. Accra: Afram publications. ISBN 9964-70-400-3.
- 2016 - Reinstating traditional music in contemporary contexts : reminiscences of a nonagenarian's lifelong encounters with the musical traditions of Africa. Akropong-Akuapem, Ghana: Regnum Africa Publications.

== Selected compositions ==
Nketia's musical compositions include:

- Adanse Kronkron
- Morbid Asem
- Monna N’Ase
- Monkafo No.
- Yaanom Montie
- Onipa Dasani Nni Aye
- Onipa Beyee Bi
- Yiadom Heneba
- Mekae Na Woantie
- Maforo Pata Hunu
- Obarima Nifahene
- Asuo Meresen
- Builsa Work Song (1960)
- Dagarti Work Song (1961)
- At the Cross Roads (1961)
- Owora (1961)
- Volta Fantasy (1961)
- Contemplation (1961)
