= Ahantaman Girls Senior High School =

Coordinates: 4.9579°N 1.7294°W

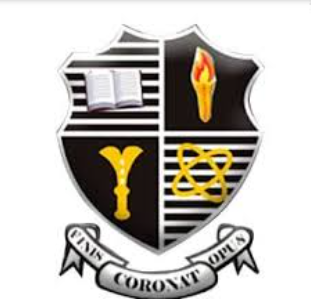
- Western region of Ghana; Ghana

Information
- Type: Girls High School
- Mottoes: the end crowns the work
- Established: 1948
- Principal: Mrs Ernestina Hammond
- Age range: 15 to 18
- Campus size: large
- Colors: black, white and mauve
- Affiliation: GSTS

Ahantaman Girls' Senior High School is an educational institution for girls. It is located at Ketan, Sekondi in the Western region of Ghana. As at the 2023, the school has a population of 2,728.

== History ==
The school has changed over the years from a private to state ownership. The school was established in 1948 by a business-inclined educationist called Mr. Emmanuel Kwasi Idun. Originally, it started as Takoradi Commercial Academy near Sekondi. The school formally became known as Royal Commercial College popularly known as ROCCO.

In 1965, the Ghana Education Service absorbed the school into the secondary school system and as a result, the school changed its name to Royal Commercial Secondary School since both commercial and secondary subjects were studied, in short it was ROCSEC.

In 1980, the school adopted a name from the traditional area which came to be known as Ahantaman Secondary School. Then it became Ahantaman Senior High School and the status of the school was changed on 17 November 2010 from a co-educational institution to a single sex school and this is Ahantaman Girls’ SHS. In essence the school has different group of students: those of the Rococo days, Rosec, Ahantaman Secondary School days, Ahantaman Senior High School and Ahantaman Girls Senior High School which all fall under the same umbrella.

The School has about one thousand five hundred students. It is both boarding and day.

== Achievements ==
In 2015, the school won the Osei-Kusi Foundation's Leadership Award Scheme for Girls.

In 2022, the school signed an agreement with Space Science Systems Research Institute, SSSRI to design a rescue assistance robot.

In 2024, Ahantaman Girls SHS partnered with the Ghana Ports and Harbours Authority to promote environmental consciousness in commemoration of World Environment Day by planting 150 seedlings.

Ahantaman Girls' SHS placed second in the 6th edition of the Energy Commission’s Renewable Energy Competition. They were defeated by Legon PRESEC who placed first, Ola Girls’ SHS, Kenyasi taking the third position, Dabokpa Technical Institute taking the fourth position, Adidome SHS taking the fifth position and Damongo SHS who was the sixth.

In 2025 during the Energy Commission’s Senior High Schools Renewable Energy Challenge, the school developed the ‘Royal Vaccine Cooler’, a solar-powered device designed to preserve vaccines in rural communities with limited access to electricity.

== Notable alumni ==
- Paapa Yankson - award-winning Ghanaian musician
