= National Honours and Awards =

Ghanaian awards ceremony

The National Honours and Awards is a national awards ceremony that honours Ghanaian people who have rendered distinguished services to Ghana in various fields and careers. The ceremony is held on 30 June every year in Ghana.

== History ==
The maiden ceremony was held in 1960 when Ghana became a republic under the auspices of the country's first president, Kwame Nkrumah. It remained a low key event until 2006 when President John Agyekum Kufour instituted 30 June every year as National Honours Day.

== The awards ==
There are five distinct awards that a recipient is given:

- Order of the Star and Eagles of Ghana
- Order of the Star of Ghana
- Order of the Volta
- The Medal for Gallantry
- The Grand Medal

== See also ==
- Orders, decorations, and medals of Ghana
