= Kakaiku =

Ghanaian popular band

Kakaiku was a popular Ghanaian band in the 1960s and 1970s. The band was formed by Moses Kweku Oppong. The band's main instrument was the guitar. It had famous members such as C.K. Mann. The band was formed on August 1, 1954, and was given the name "Kakaiku", his childhood nickname.
