= Atumpan (singer) =

Ghanaian musical artist

- Also known as: Atumpan
- Born: Frank Elinam Cobbinah; December 24, 1983 (age 42); Accra, Ghana
- Origin: Avenor, Ghana
- Genres: Dancehall, hiplife, Afropop
- Occupations: Rapper, singer, teacher, entrepreneur
- Years active: 2011–present
- Label: Hard Boy Music

Frank Elinam Cobbinah (born 24 December 1983), commonly known by his stage name Atumpan, is a Ghanaian afrobeats and dancehall singer. Cobbinah founded his own record label, Hard Boy Music, which mainly signs other Afro beats artists.

== Recognition and musical style ==
Cobbinah began performing as Atumpan (meaning Talking Drum in the Akan language) in 2011, when he released "The Thing", which won Best Afro pop Song of the Year, and Best Collaboration of the year in the 2012 Vodafone Ghana Music Awards.

In 2013, he was nominated for Best African Act in the 2013 MOBO Awards. He also won the Best International Afrobeats Act in the 2013 BEFFTA Awards. In 2014, Cobbinah was nominated in the Urban Music Awards for the Best African/Afrobeat Act along with Sarkodie and Fuse ODG.

Atumpan's singles with Hardboy Music include "Regina" and "Gimme some more", which feature Samini and Sarkodie respectively.

== Awards and nominations ==
=== Ghana Music Awards ===
- "Best New Artist 2012" - Nominee
- "Best New Artist Of The Year" - Nominee
- "Best Collaboration of the Year" - Nominee

=== BEFFTA Awards ===
- "Best International Afrobeats Act" - Won

=== MOBO Awards ===
- "Best African Act" - Nominee

=== Urban Music Awards Awards ===
- "Best African/Afrobeat Act" - WON

=== Ghana Music Awards UK ===
- UK-based artist of the year
