= Atumpan (drum) =

Type of Asante talking drum

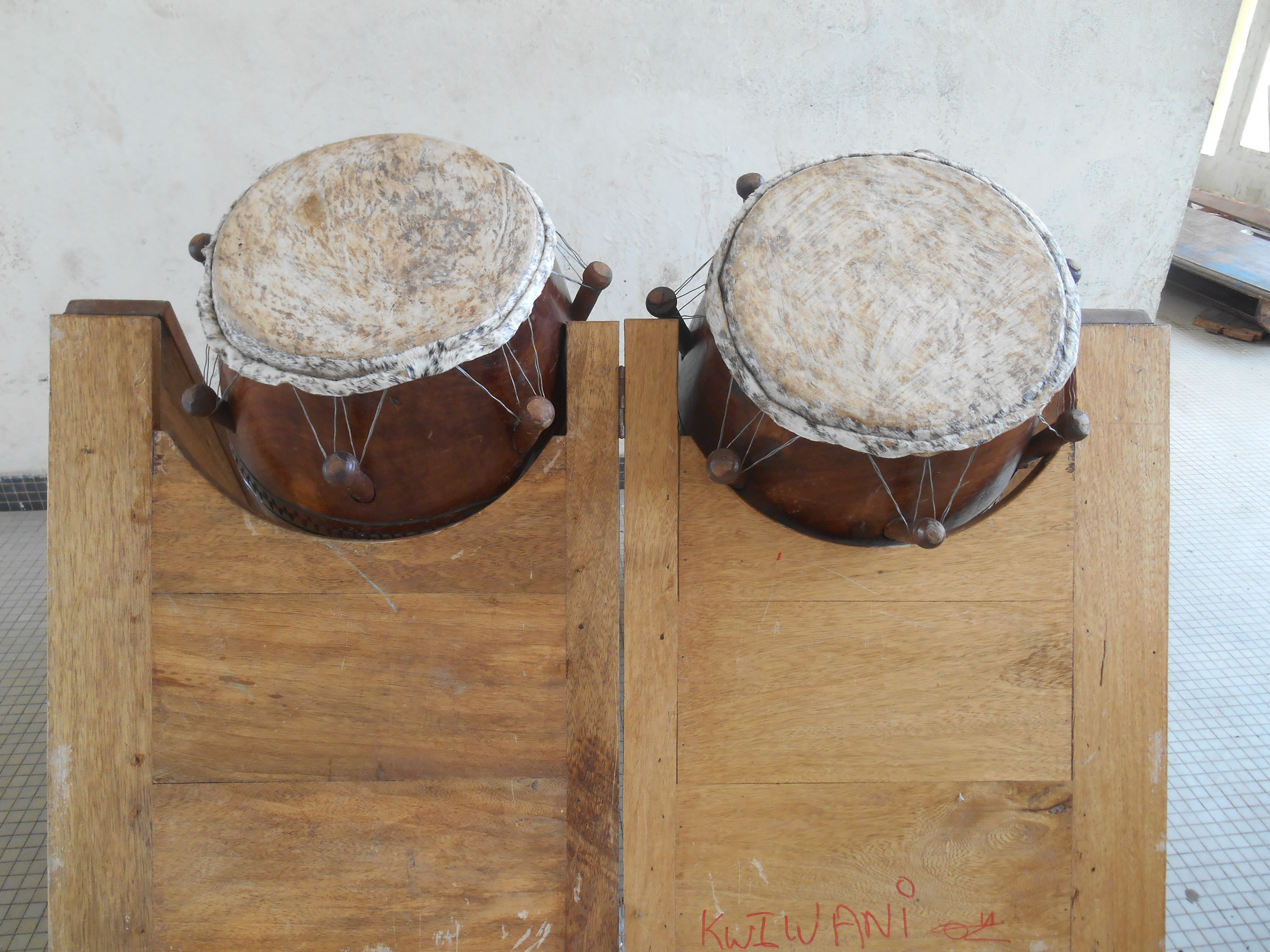
- Classification: Membranophone
- Inventor(s): Akans, Asantes

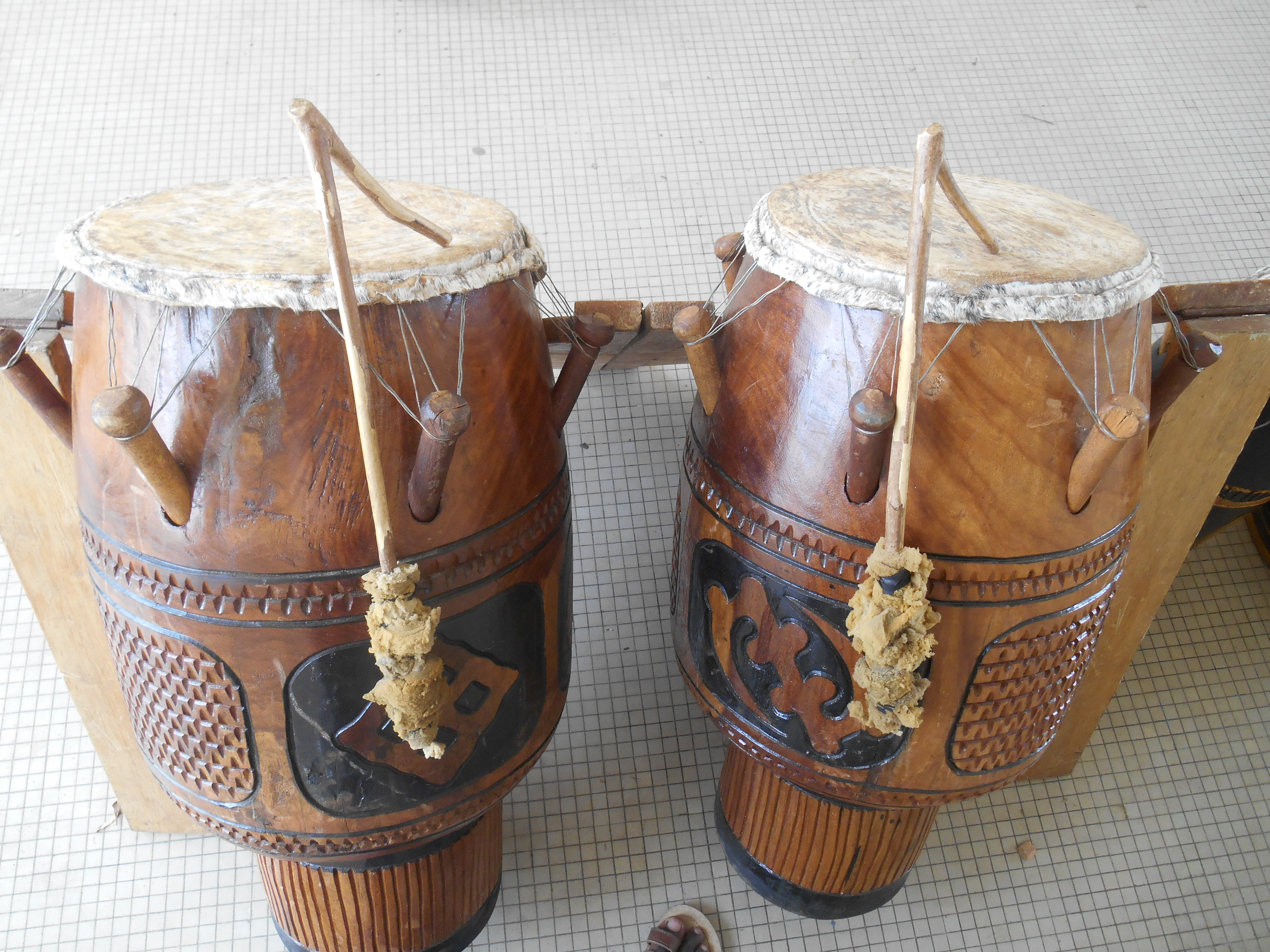
A pair of Atumpan drums

The Atumpan is a type of Asante talking drum. Played in pairs, these drums provide the bass part in Adowa dance ensembles. These drums are also found in Fontomfrom ensembles.

== Construction and functionality ==
The body of the atumpan is made of wood, with a hollow interior. Its bottom is open, to increase its resonance. Its drumhead is made of animal hide that is stretched out to cover the top of the drum's body. There are several pegs near the top of the drum's body, which tension cords attached to them. These cords extend to the drumhead, holding it in place. Most atumpans are about 25 centimeters (8 inches) in width, and almost 60 centimeters (22 inches) high.

== Playing Techniques ==
Some groups, including the Sissala, anchor a pair of drums to a ground stake with rope. Carved from a single block of wood, the atumpan has a narrow, open bottom and a much wider main body. When marching in processions, it takes two people to operate: one to carry the drum on their head and another to beat it from behind. The pair consists of a higher-pitched "female" drum and a lower-pitched "male" drum. Played while standing, the atumpan heads are struck with hooked sticks, hands, or fingers to generate sound. The atumpan is played either with one's bare hands or L-shaped sticks.

== Gallery ==
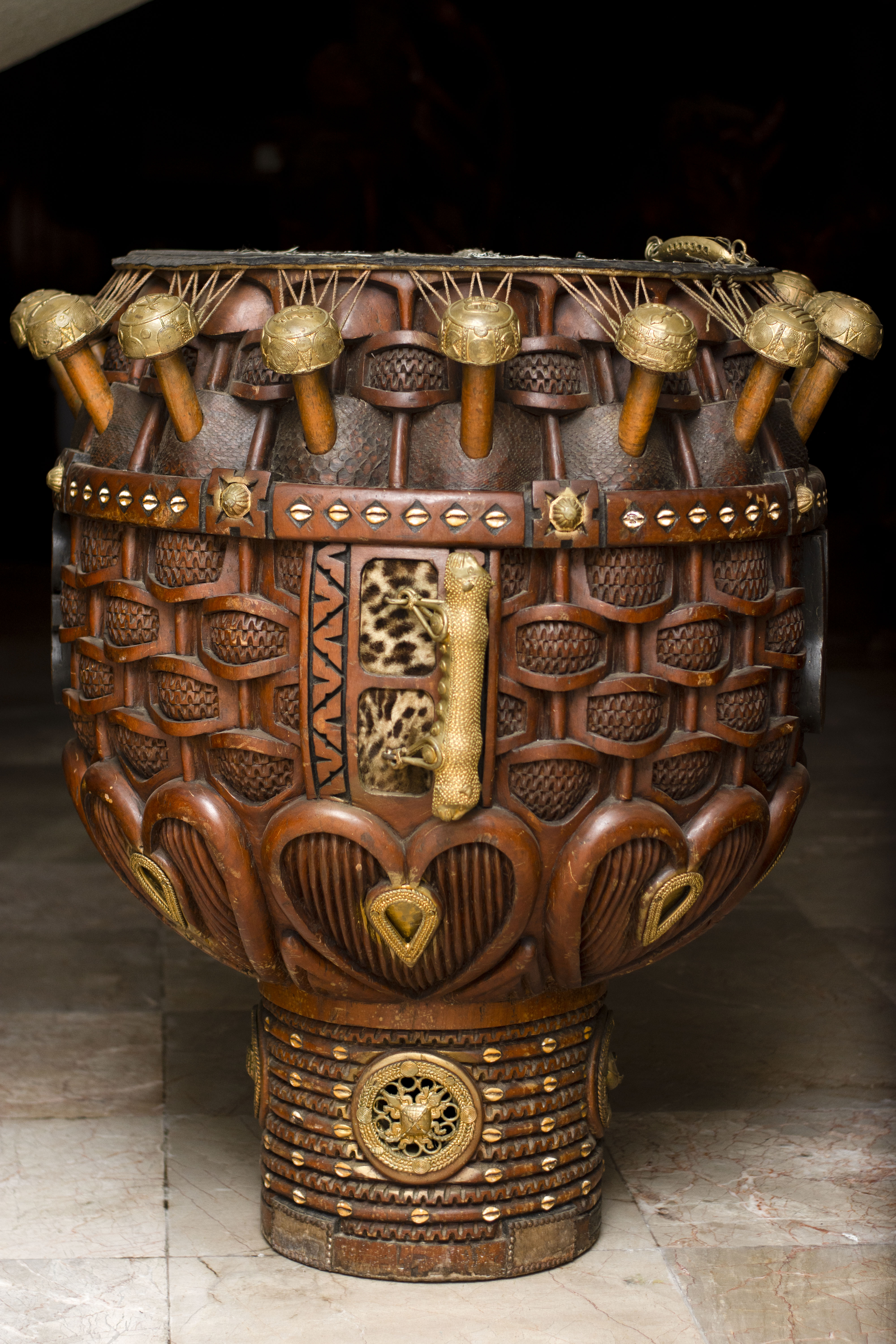
ATUMPAN (MALE)

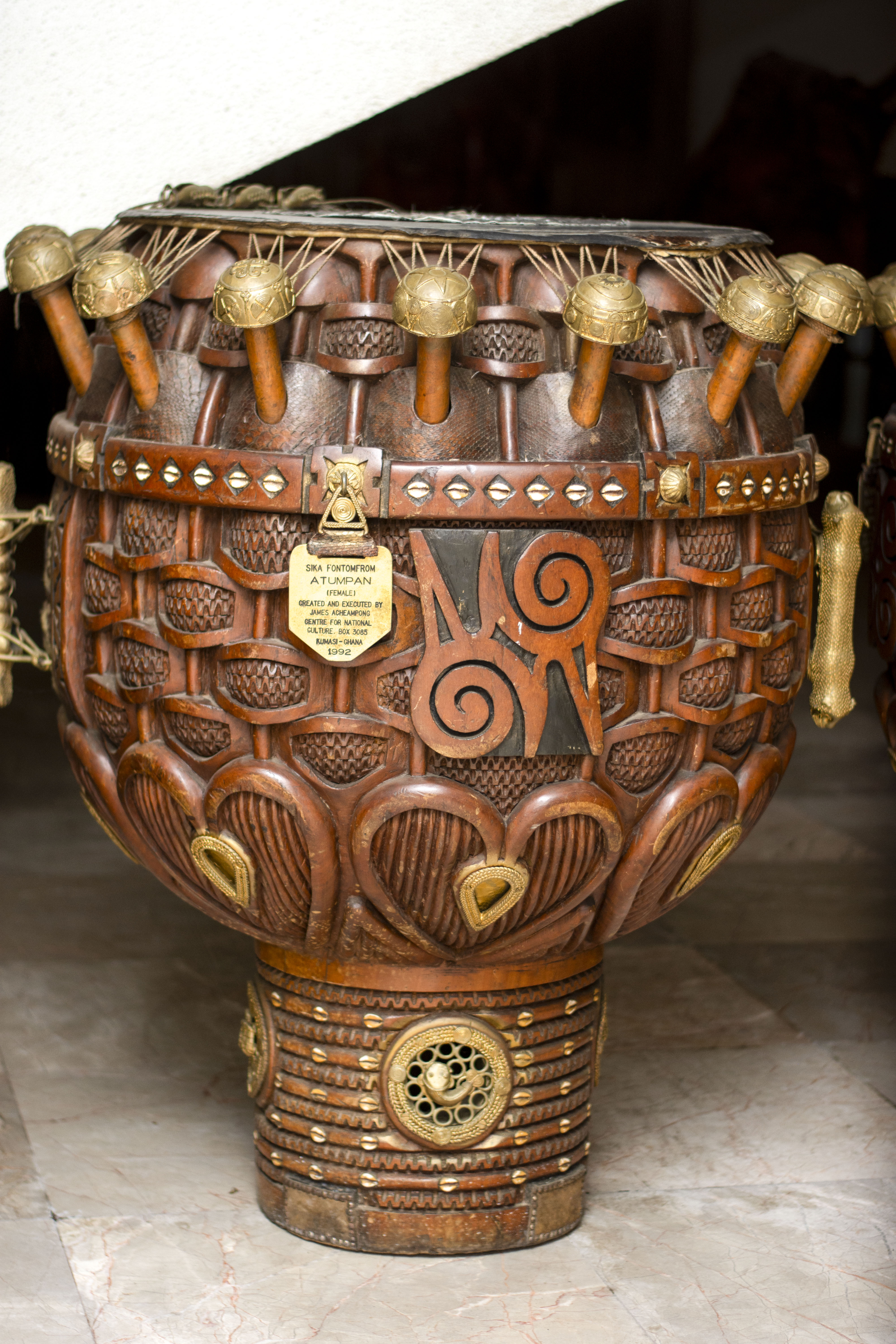
ATUMPAN (FEMALE)

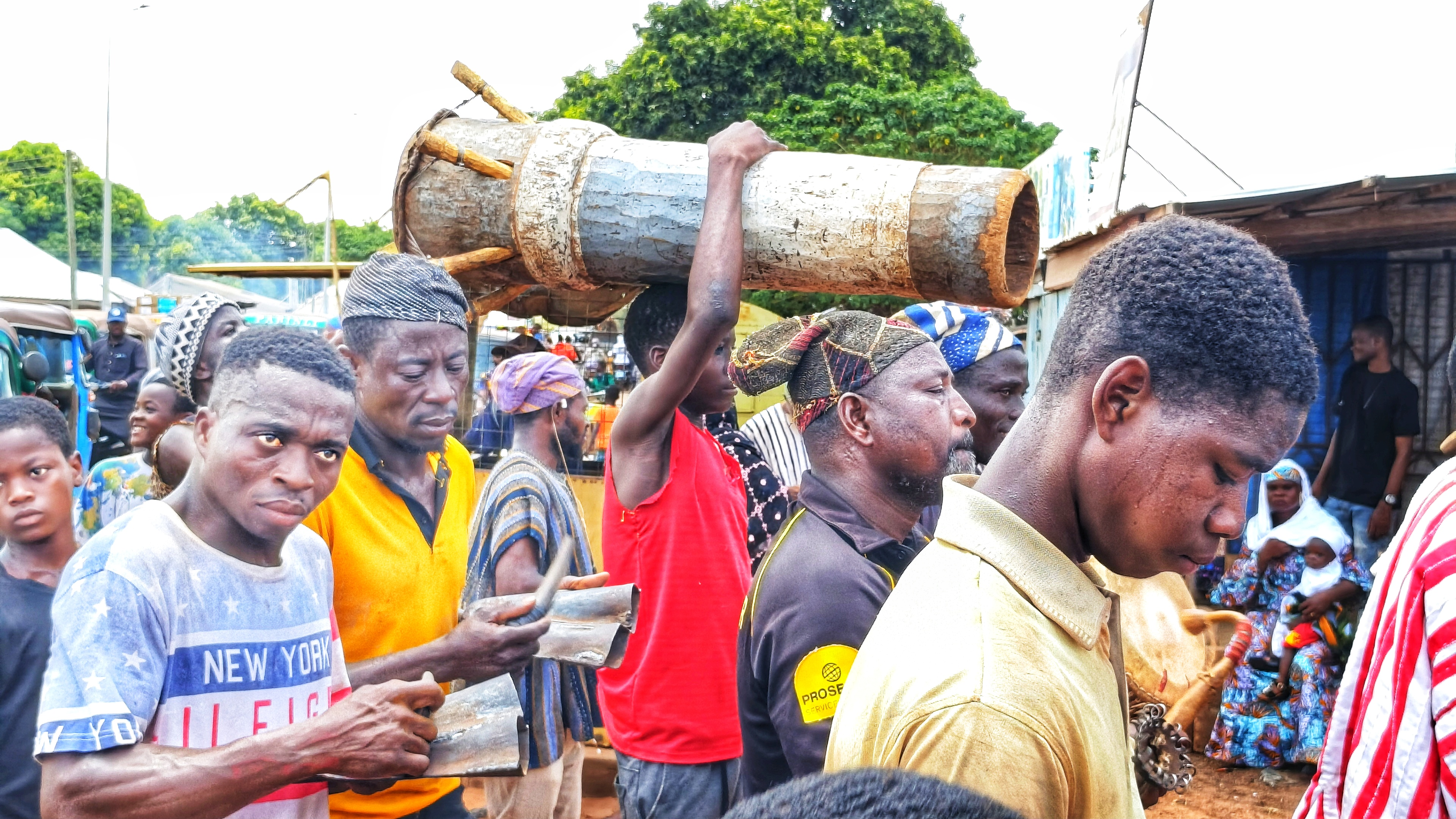
man carrying Atumpan

== History ==
The atumpan or ntumpane talking drum are used by Asante and Akan to communicate/send messages and are mostly found in Ghana.
