= Order of the Star of Ghana =

National award

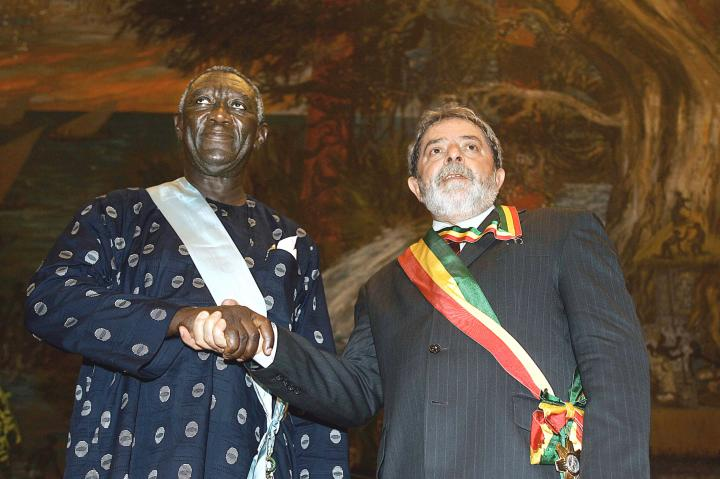
- Presidents Lula da Silva, with the sash of the Order of the Star of Ghana, and John Kufuor, with the sash of the Order of the Southern Cross, meet in Accra.

Awarded by President of Ghana
- Type: Order
- Established: 1 July 1960
- Status: Currently awarded
- Grand Master: President of Ghana
- Grades: Companion (CSG) Officer (OSG) Member (MSG)

Precedence
- Next (higher): Grand Order of the Star and Eagles of Ghana
- Next (lower): Order of the Volta
- Ribbon bar of the order

The Order of the Star of Ghana is the second-highest award given by the Government of Ghana to any individual who had helped the cause of the country in one way or the other. Recipients of this award are decorated at a state function, chaired by the President of the Republic. It was the highest national award until 23 June 2008, when it was superseded by the Grand Order of the Star and Eagles of Ghana.

== Grades ==
- Companion (CSG) – Honorary Division, Civil Division
- Officer (OSG) – Honorary Division, Civil Division, Military Division
- Member (MSG) – Honorary Division, Civil Division, Military Division, Police Division

== Insignia ==
The Insignia comprises a seven-pointed star medal, 51 mm in diameter, hung on a ring and worn with a ribbon collar, along with a sash, pendant, and rosette. The ribbon is 35 mm wide with three equal stripes of red, yellow, and green. The sash measures 102 mm in width. The Companion wears it over the right shoulder, while the Officer and Member wear it over the left. The order is awarded in three classes:

- Companion (CSG)
  - 18 Carat Gold Medal
    - Obverse: Features a flying eagle and star facing left, set in white gold on a yellow gold medal.
    - Reverse: Encircling the Coat of Arms of Ghana is the inscription 'Companion of the Order of the Star of Ghana.'
- Officer (OSG)
  - In silver with gold centre
- Member (MSG)
  - In silver

== Recipients ==
Companions of the Star of Ghana (CSG)

- Lula Da Silva , President of Brazil (2005), Honorary
- Giorgio Napolitano, President of Italy (2006), Honorary
- Queen Elizabeth II (2007), Honorary
- Alhaji Aliu Mahama (2008)
- Prof. John Evans Atta Mills (2008)
- Nana Addo Dankwa Akufo-Addo (2008)
- Otumfuo Osei Tutu II (2008)
- Queen Beatrix of the Netherlands (2008), Honorary
- Dr. Kwadwo Afari-Gyan (2015)
- Michael Adenyi Ishola Adenuga Jr., Nigerian entrepreneur (2016), Honorary
- Alassane Ouattara, President of Ivory Coast (2017), Honorary
- Mohammed VI of Morocco (2017), Honorary
- Charles III (2018), Honorary
- William Ruto, President of Kenya (2024), Honorary

Officers of the Star of Ghana (OSG)

- Narendra Modi, Prime Minister of India (2025), Honorary

Members of the Star of Ghana (MSG)

- Joseph Hanson Kwabena Nketia (2000)
- Major Seth Anthony (2006)
- Sun Baohong, Ambassador of China to Ghana (2017), Honorary

== See also ==
- Orders, decorations, and medals of Ghana
