= National Academy of Music =

University department in Winneba, Ghana

The National Academy of Music is a Ghanaian institution for the training and development of musician from around the county. It is under the University of Education in Winneba. The school offers undergraduate and post graduate degrees in music.

== History ==
The academy was established in 1970 as a separate campus of the Specialist Training College. Graduates from the academy were expected to pass the British Licentiate of the Royal School of Music diploma examinations. The establishment was to expand further the scope of music instructors in the country. In 1992, the academy became the Department of Music of the University College of Education, Winneba as part of the Government's University Rationalization programme.
