= Orders, decorations, and medals of Ghana =

Immediately following independence, three orders were introduced in Ghana: Order of the Star of Ghana, Order of the Volta, and Ghana Service Order. These were instituted in 1960 as a replacement for the British honours system that was conferred under the Gold Coast and the Dominion of Ghana. The first National Honours and Awards ceremony under the new system was administered by Ghana's first president, Kwame Nkrumah. President Nkrumah planned to introduce two more orders in 1962: the Order of the Black Star and the Most Exalted Order of African Redemption. These efforts appear to have never come to fruition. After the military coup d'état of 1966, the Government of Ghana reverted to three State Honors and sought to remove all vestiges of the Nkrumah administration.

President John Kufuor added a controversial Grand Order of the Star and Eagles of Ghana in June 2008, thereby increasing the number of State Honors to four.

== State Honors ==
=== Order of the Star of Ghana ===
ribbon bar

The ribbon is 35 mm wide with three equal stripes of red, yellow, and green.

- Companion (CSG) - Honorary Division, Civil Division
- Officer (OSG) - Honorary Division, Civil Division, Military Division
- Member (MSG) - Civil Division, Military Division, Police Division, Honorary Division

=== Order of the Volta ===
ribbon bar

Ribbon: navy blue with red borders and a central black stripe.

- Companion (CV) - Civil Division, Military Division, Honorary Division
- Officer (OV) - Civil Division, Military Division, Honorary Division
- Member (MV) - Civil Division, Military Division, Police Division, Honorary Division

=== Medal for Gallantry ===
Ribbon: central navy blue, with towards the border, a thin red stripe and a broad yellow stripe border.

- Medal for Gallantry (MG)
  - Honorary Division
  - Civil Division
  - Military Division
  - Police Division

=== Grand Medal ===
- Honorary Division
- Civil Division
- Military Division
- Police Division
- Prisons Division

== Other Orders ==
There are Orders within Ghana also awarded by traditional, constitutionally recognized, subnational Kingdoms.

- Constitution of the Republic of Ghana 1992 Chieftaincy

=== Kingdom of Godenu ===
- Royal Order of the Crown of Godenu
- Royal Order of the Elephant of Godenu
- Royal Order of the Lion of Godenu

=== Kingdom of Gbi Hohoe-Ahado ===
- Royal Order of Merit
- Royal Order of Adziwonor III

=== Kingdom of Ashanti Akyem Hwidiem ===
- Royal Order of the Golden Leopard

=== Kingdom of New Sawereso-Seinuah ===
- Royal Order of the Cross
- Royal Order of Agyemang III
- Royal Order of the Majestic Sun
- Royal Order of the Tiger and Hawk

=== Kingdom of Abura Papagya ===
- Royal Order of Kwakyen Ababio

== Service Awards ==
Grand Medal for Gallantry
Republic Day Medal (type II)
Revolution Day Medal - 24 February 1966
Gallantry Cross
Police Cross
Prison Cross
Distinguished Service Order (Military, Police, Prisons)
June 4 Revolution Day Medal
United Nations Peacekeeping Medal - Congo
United Nations Peacekeeping Medal - Middle East
31 December Revolution Medal
ECOMOG Medal
Military Cross
Distinguished Service Cross
Flying Cross
Good Conduct Medal
Military Medal
Mention in Dispatches
Long Service and Efficiency Medal
Long Service and Good Conduct Medal
Efficiency Medal

== See also ==
- National Honours and Awards
