= Grand Order of the Star and Eagles of Ghana =

National award

Order of the Star and Eagles of Ghana

Awarded by President of Ghana
- Type: Order
- Established: 23 June 2008
- Status: Currently awarded
- Grand Master: President of Ghana

Precedence
- Next (higher): None
- Next (lower): Order of the Star of Ghana

The Grand Order of the Star and Eagles of Ghana is an order created by President John Kufuor of Ghana on 23 June 2008. The award superseded the Order of the Star of Ghana as the highest national decoration.

It is to be presented only to those who have obtained the office of President of the Republic of Ghana.

== Criticism ==
There was criticism to the order's creation. Some suggested it was inappropriate for such an order with such limited members to be the highest in the land.

Others have suggested this is simply a vanity title for the outgoing president and comparisons have been made to African dictators who gave themselves titles (such as Idi Amin).

Others have suggested that the order is illegal as it was instituted by executive ordinance rather than being a parliamentary motion. Although the President is "fount of honour" (in that all honours flow from the President, similar to the British model where all honours flow from the King) it is debatable whether the President has the authority to create a new order.
