= Fontomfrom =

Hourglass-shaped drum from Western Africa

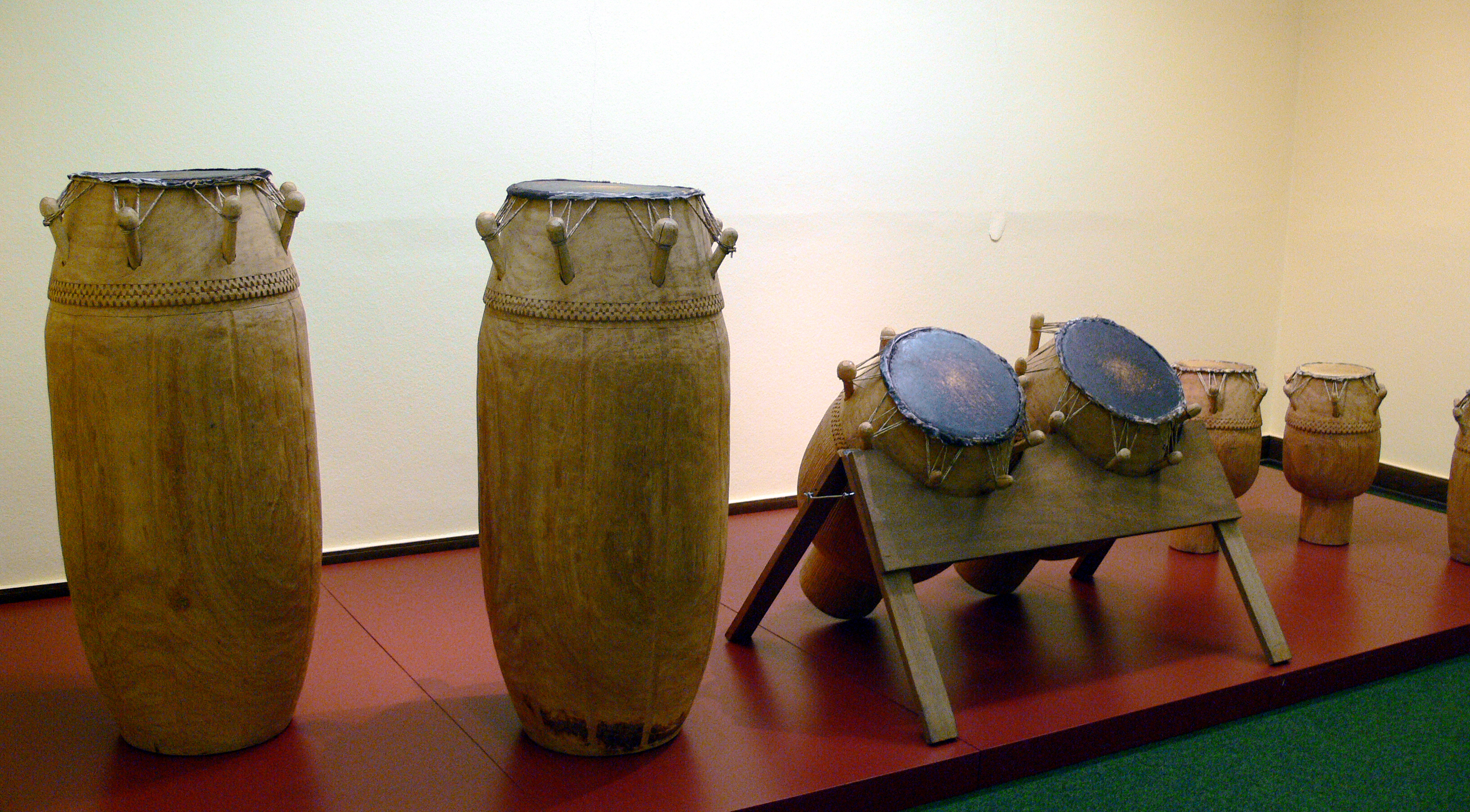
- Fontomfrom ensemble; Department of Music Ethnology, Ethnological Museum of Berlin in Berlin of Germany.
- Classification: Hourglass-Shaped Drum
- Inventor: Bono people

Builders
- Bono people

Fontomfrom is a Bono type of hourglass-shaped drum mostly used in a royal music ensemble of the Bono people to relay Bono monarchy messages within the Bono people's ethnic group setting. The Fontomfrom ensemble provides music for ceremonies honoring Bono chiefs and Bono monarchy royal processions. The Fontomfrom is also used to recite proverbs or replicate patterns of speech at most Bono monarchy royal gatherings or a Bono monarchy royal durbar.

== Gallery ==
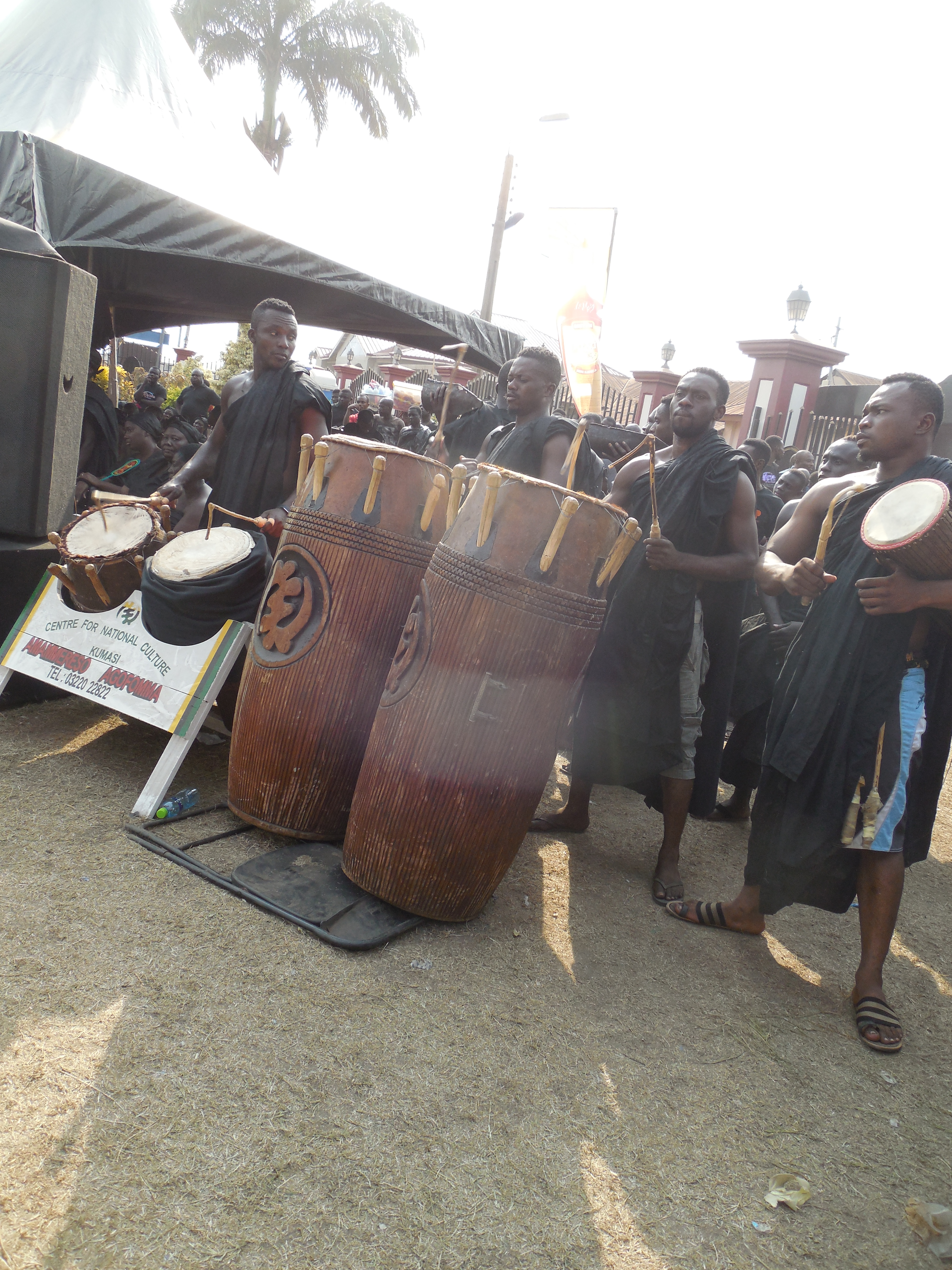
At a funeral

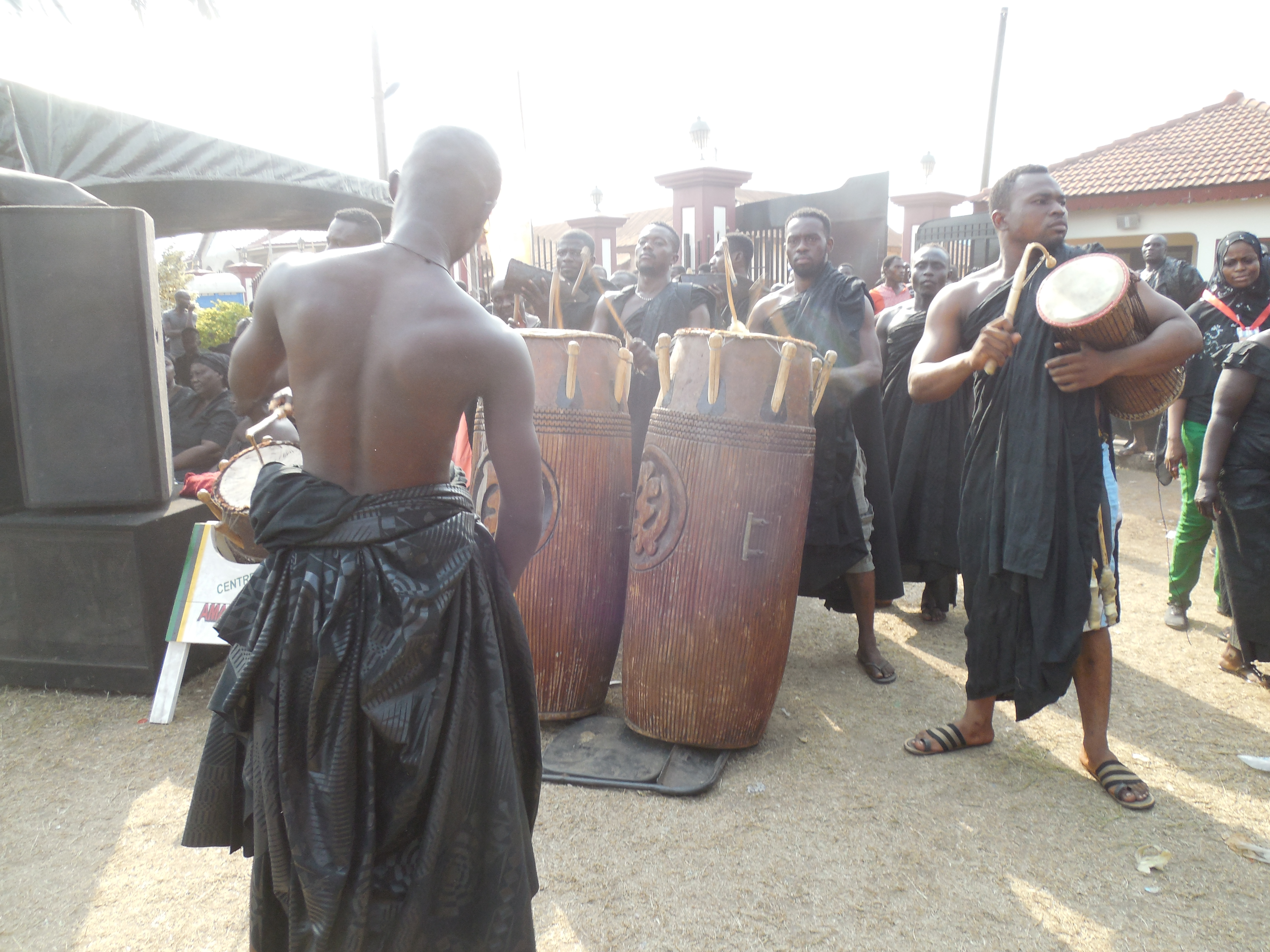
At a funeral

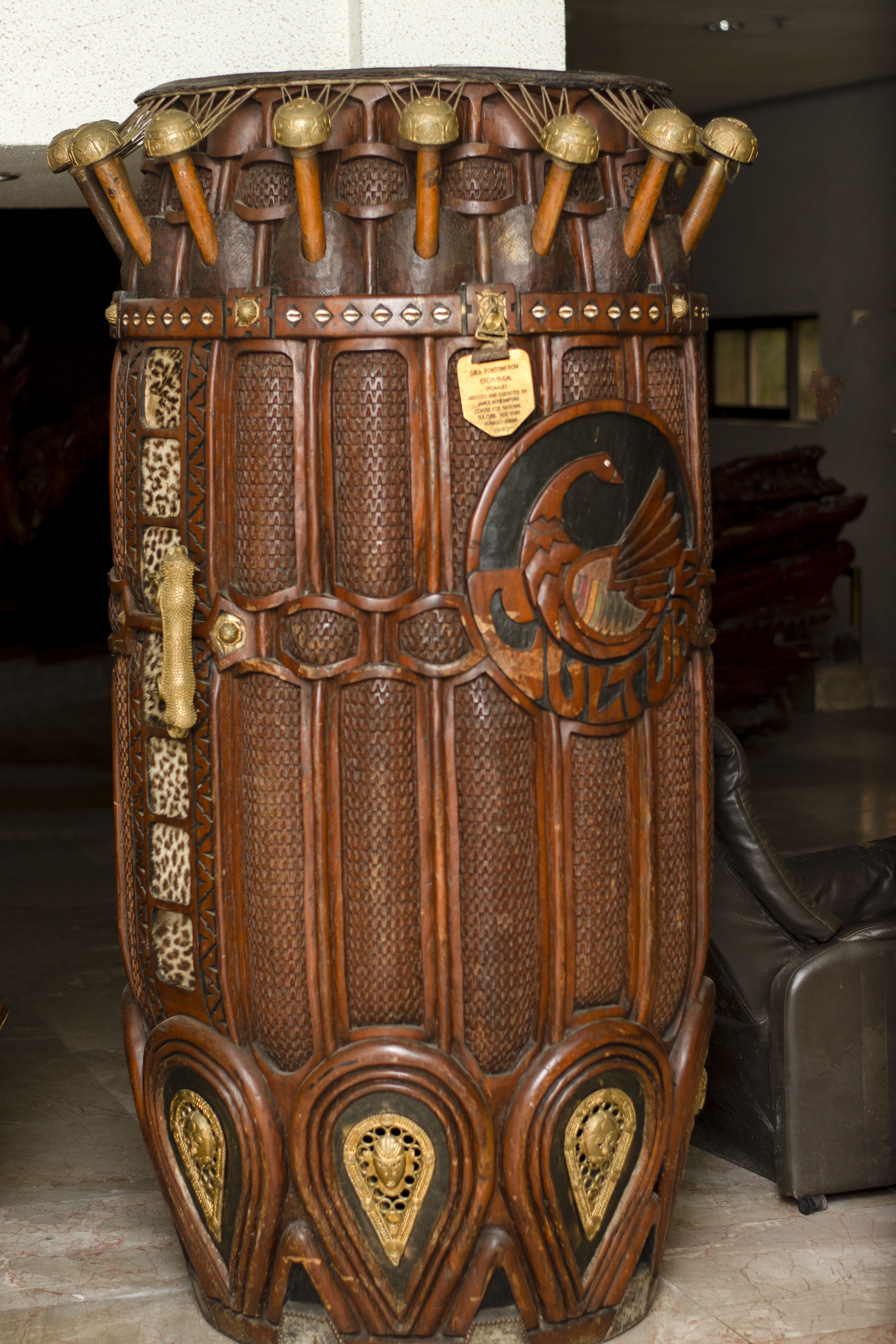
FONTOMFROM BOMMA (MALE)

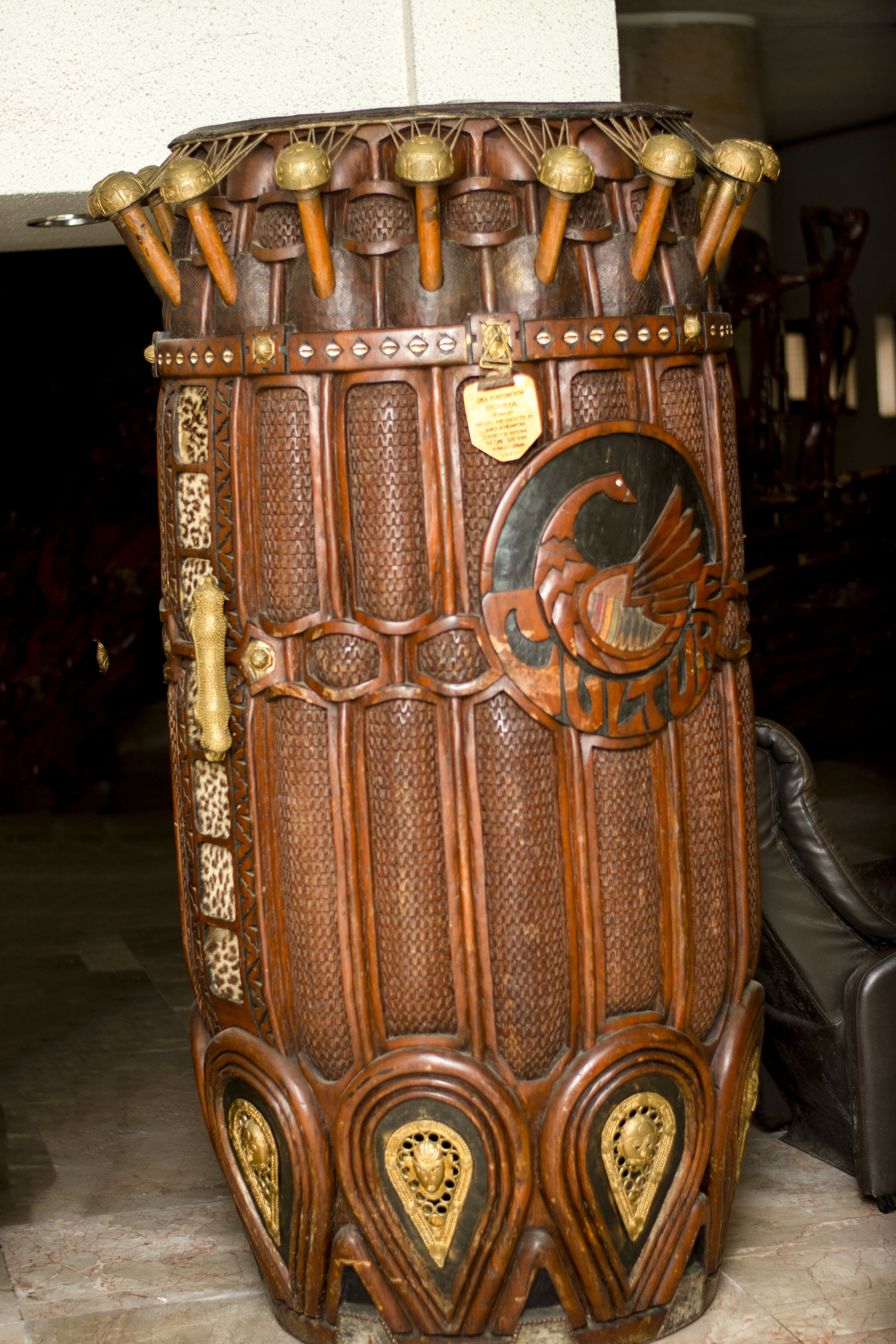
FONTOMFROM BOMMA (FEMALE)

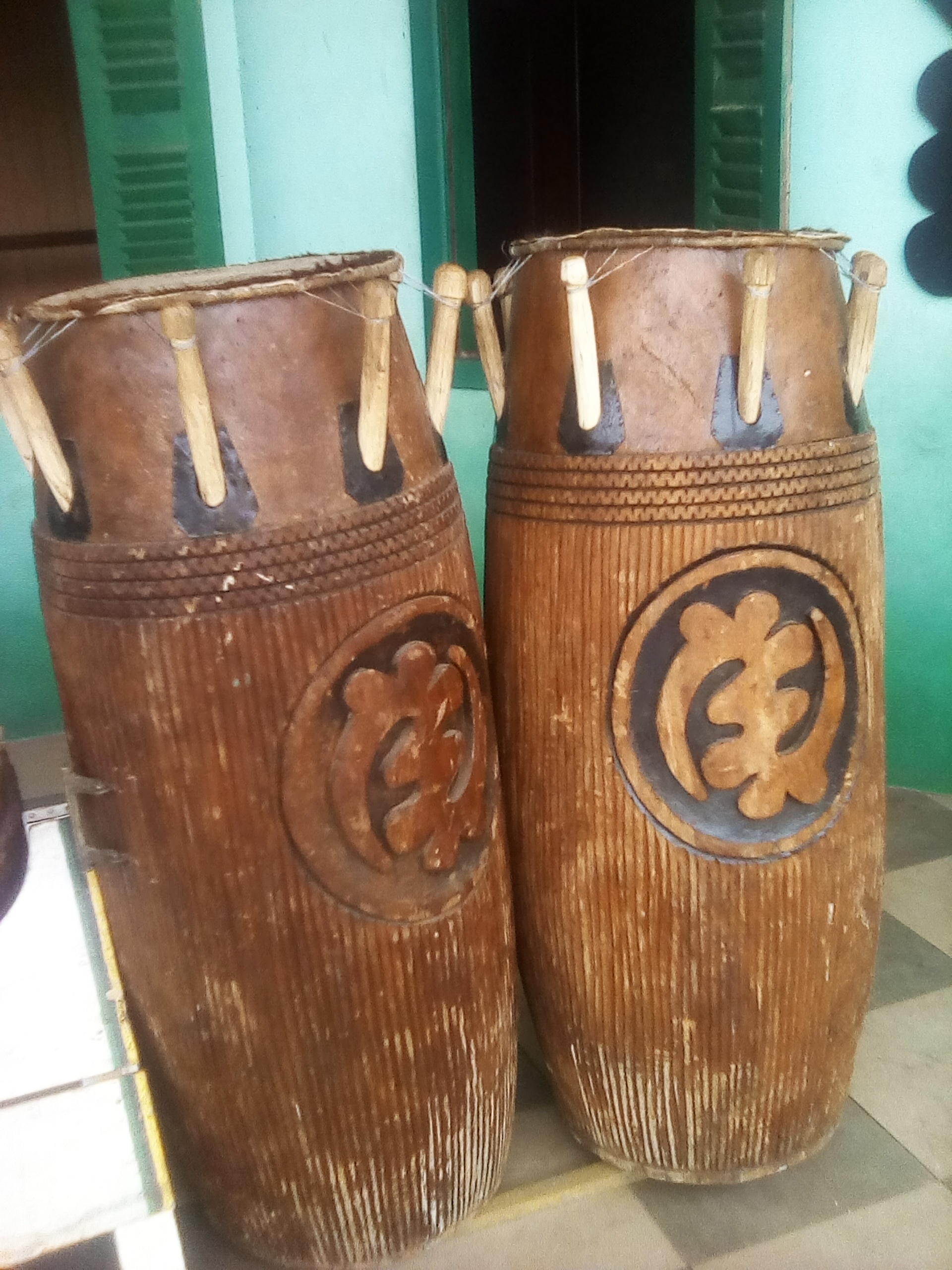
Side view

== History ==
The Fontomfrom evolved from the popular hourglass-shaped drum (talking drum) of the 7th century. Shortly after the evolution, a few more non-hourglass shapes, such as the Dunan, Sangban, Kenkeni , and Ngoma drums were produced.

Prior to the Fontomfrom becoming part of the Bono royal music ensemble as it is today, it was first introduced into Bonoman by Bonohene Akumfi Ameyaw I and Bonohemaa Owusuaa Abrafi circa 1320s, from North Africa. As they love dancing and music, the Bono people introduced this drum to entertain themselves. Since its inception and use, the single, large Fontomfrom drum has grown to become an ensemble of several drums, and given its formidable size (up to 2 meters in height or more), its image can be used to symbolise the grandeur of traditional African cultures.
