= Big Science (Laurie Anderson album) =

Studio album by Laurie Anderson
- Released: 19 April 1982
- Studios: The Lobby, The Hit Factory, New York City
- Genres: Art pop; electronic; minimalism
- Length: 38:19
- Labels: Warner Bros.; Nonesuch; Elektra
- Producers: Laurie Anderson; Roma Baran

Laurie Anderson chronology
You're the Guy I Want to Share My Money With (1981)	Big Science (1982)	Mister Heartbreak (1984)

Singles from Big Science
- 1. "O Superman" Released: October 9, 1981 (UK); 2. "Big Science" Released: April 16, 1982 (UK)

Professional ratings
Review scores
Source	Rating
AllMusic	4.5/5 stars
Blender	4/5 stars
Encyclopedia of Popular Music	4/5 stars
Pitchfork	8.7/10
Rolling Stone	4/5 stars
Smash Hits	6/10
Spin	4/5 stars
Uncut	4/5 stars
The Village Voice	A−

Big Science is the debut studio album by American performance artist and musician Laurie Anderson. It was the first of a seven-album deal Anderson signed with Warner Bros. Records. The album consists of a selection of musical highlights from her eight-hour production United States Live, which was itself released as a 5-LP box set and book in 1984.

The album is best known for the single "O Superman", which unexpectedly reached No. 2 in the UK after being discovered and promoted by BBC DJ John Peel. After Big Science, music played a larger role in Anderson's work.

== Background ==
Although considered her debut album, Anderson had previously recorded one side of a 2-LP set titled You're the Guy I Want to Share My Money With, a collaboration released on Giorno Poetry Systems with William S. Burroughs and John Giorno. She had also contributed two pieces to a 1977 compilation of electronic music.

Several tracks on Big Science, as musicologist S. Alexander Reed demonstrates, originated as reworked fragments from Laurie Anderson's large-scale performance United States I–IV, often combining material from different periods and contexts into newly structured songs. For example, "From the Air" merges text from an earlier spoken-word piece, "The Language of the Future", with music initially used as an instrumental introduction to the stage work, reflecting Anderson's compositional method of layering narrative, technology, and performance history. More broadly, the album's musical structure reflects Anderson's interest in rhythmic ambiguity and nonstandard phrasing, shaped in part by her exposure to Cuban and Latin music, resulting in grooves that deliberately obscure conventional downbeats and challenge listeners' sense of temporal orientation.

An alternate mix of "Let X=X" was released as a flexi disc in the February issue of Artforum earlier in 1982. A sleeve for the disc could be cut out from the magazine and assembled.

A newly remastered version of the album was released on 18 June 2007 by Nonesuch/Elektra Records with new liner notes, the bonus track "Walk the Dog" (the B-side of the original "O Superman" single), and the "O Superman" music video.

== Reception ==
Laurie Anderson enjoyed a surprise popular hit in the United Kingdom with "O Superman" in 1981. Her subsequent albums Big Science and Mister Heartbreak each sold between 100,000 and 125,000 copies in the United States, and even the five-record United States - Live sold 40,000, according to Elliot Abbott, Anderson's manager and the executive producer of Home of the Brave. As of 1983, the album had sold 150,000 copies worldwide.

Big Science was widely praised on release, largely riding the success of “O Superman” and Anderson’s reputation in the art world. Reviewers mostly treated it as an ambitious, high-prestige crossover that brought performance art and experimental composition into pop culture—even if in so doing, it vexed categories of genre.

== Legacy ==
Slant Magazine listed the album at number 44 on its list of "Best Albums of the 1980s". In 2018, Pitchfork listed the album at number 22 on its list of the "200 Best Albums of the 1980s".

In addition to jumpstarting Anderson's wider fame, the album has been interpreted as a conceptual exploration of identity, authority, and mediated experience in late 20th-century America. Scholars such as Reed and Susan McClary have noted that Anderson frequently employs distanced or artificial vocal personas—such as vocoded or narratorial voices—to represent what has been described as a "Voice of Authority",reflecting institutional speech and mass communication. In this reading, Big Science constructs a surrogate audience—sometimes theorized in relation to the philosophical concept of the "Big Other"—through which systems of power, technology, and national identity are staged and questioned—while maintaining a narrative perspective that reviewers and scholars have described as ambiguous or impersonal.

== Track listing ==
All tracks are written by Laurie Anderson.

No.	Title	Length
1.	"From the Air"	4:29
2.	"Big Science"	6:25
3.	"Sweaters"	2:18
4.	"Walking & Falling"	2:10
5.	"Born, Never Asked"	4:56
6.	"O Superman (For Massenet)"	8:21
7.	"Example #22"	2:59
8.	"Let X=X/It Tango"	6:52
Total length:		38:19

"O Superman" mixed at The Lobby; originally released on One Ten Records
"Example #22" special thanks to Paranormals Medeline Vester, Gerhard Rozhek, Coretta Atteroc, Shelley Karson
"Let X=X" original version appeared in ArtForum February 1982

== Personnel ==
- Laurie Anderson – vocals, Roland VP-330, Farfisa organ, percussion, Oberheim OB-Xa, sticks, violins, electronics, keyboards, handclaps, whistling, marimba, cover artwork
- Roma Baran – Farfisa organ, glass harmonica, sticks, handclaps, Casiotone, accordion, whistling
- Perry Hoberman – flute, saxophone, piccolo, backing vocals, bottles and sticks, handclaps, assistant producer, art direction
- Bill Obrecht – alto saxophone
- Peter Gordon – clarinet, tenor saxophone
- David Van Tieghem – drums, rototoms, timpani, marimba, percussion

Additional personnel

- Rufus Harley – bagpipes (3)
- Chuck Fisher – alto and tenor saxophones (7)
- Richard Cohen – clarinets, bassoon, baritone saxophone (7)
- Leanne Ungar – engineer, backing vocals (7)
- George E. Lewis – trombones

"Special thanks to Patty Anderson, Lester Bangs, Robert Coe, Anton Fier, Charles Holland, Geraldine Pontius, Greg Shifrin and Gail Turner".

Big Science (reduced quality)
from Big Science by Laurie Anderson, Warner Bros. 1982, Nonesuch Records 2007. Sample from Warner Bros. Label 1984 via iTunes

== Charts ==
Album

Year	Chart	Position
1982	Billboard 200	124
1982	New Zealand Albums	8
1982	UK Albums	29
