= Comic Book Confidential =

1988 film by Ron Mann

- Movie poster
- Directed by: Ron Mann
- Written by: Ron Mann; Charley Lippincott
- Produced by: Don Haig; Martin Harbury; Charley Lippincott; Ron Mann
- Starring: Will Eisner; Robert Crumb; William M. Gaines; Jack Kirby; Stan Lee; Frank Miller
- Cinematography: Joan Churchill; Robert Fresco
- Edited by: Robert Kennedy; Ron Mann
- Music by: Dr. John; Keith Elliott; Gerard Leckey
- Production company: Sphinx Productions
- Distributed by: Cineplex Odeon Films (Canada); Cinecom Pictures (United States)
- Release date: September 23, 1988
- Running time: 90 minutes
- Countries: United States; Canada
- Language: English
- Budget: $700,000
- Box office: $37,344

Comic Book Confidential is a documentary film, released in 1988. Directed by Ron Mann and written by Mann and Charley Lippincott, the film is a survey of the history of the comic book medium in the United States from the 1930s to the 1980s, as an art form and in social context.

== Plot ==
The film includes profiles of twenty-two notable and influential talents in the comics field, such as Charles Burns, Art Spiegelman, Françoise Mouly, Frank Miller, Stan Lee, Will Eisner, Robert Crumb, Harvey Pekar and William M. Gaines. In interviews, the creators discuss their contributions and history, and read passages from their works over filmograph animations. Montages of comics through the decades, archival footage of an old 1950s show called Confidential File, and a live-action Zippy the Pinhead are featured.

== Production ==
=== Development ===
Ron Mann moved to Hollywood in 1985 following the success of Imagine the Sound and Poetry in Motion, but was $70,000 in debt after the failure of Listen to the City. Mann called Joe Medjuck seeking work and received contract to write three scripts for Ivan Reitman. He was able to pay his debts and had $100,000 in his bank account.

Mann attended a comic book convention at the suggestion of Charley Lippincott. Mann talked to Emile de Antonio and bpNichol about making a film about comic books. Mann was hired to make an electronic press kit for Legal Eagles, after initially proposing to make a documentary about the making of the film. He decided to use the free film stock and crew he was given to interview comic book artists in New York. Universal Pictures was unimpressed with the footage Mann shot and requested that he return the footage. After this he considered making a film about Dario Fo, titled Enemy of the Obvious, and received a $35,000 grant from the Canada Council. However, he decided to not go forward as one of his friends made a film about the San Francisco Mime Troupe and gave back the grant.

Mann returned to the comic books concept and the first investment was USD5,000 from Feiffer's Swan Foundation, which later invested another USD5,000. The Canada Council gave him a $35,000 grant. He planned on proposing a half-hour documentary to the Canadian Broadcasting Corporation and asked Don Haig to produce it, but Haig derided the project and asked "who reads comic books?". Haig agreed to produce, but they decided to expand the length of the film after conducting research.

=== Financing ===
Telefilm Canada's Theatrical Fund only gave grants to fictional films. Mann instead had to apply for the Broadcast Fund, which required a Canadian broadcaster to purchase the film's broadcast license for 25% of its budget. Mann initially budgeted the film at $360,000 and sold the license to Citytv for $90,000, which would be paid in installments over the 48 months after the completion of the film. The film was required to be completed by September 1987. The Ontario Film Development Corporation initially planned to give $25,000 in equity and $90,000 for interim financing, but invested $115,000 directly instead due to the Citytv license's long payment timetable. Martin Harbury was hired as an executive producer at the request of Telefilm.

Mann sold the theatrical distribution rights to Cineplex Odeon Films for a minimum guarantee of $200,000 and an advance of $40,000. He selected Cineplex Odeon as he liked P4W: Prison for Women, another documentary they distributed.

The film's budget in 1986 was $500,000 with $141,000 coming from Telefilm, $115,000 from the OFDC, $40,000 from the Canada Council, $40,000 from Cineplex-Odeon, and $25,000 in deferrals. However, the budget rose to $700,000 due to production delays and was paid by Mann taking $200,000 in debt. Mann took a $25,000 loan from Marvin Pludwinski and sold his equity to Pludwinski for another $25,000.

=== Filming ===
Fifty to sixty people were interviewed for the film, but only twenty-two were shown in the film. He interviewed Frank Zappa about music censorship, but was not shown in the film. 70 hours of footage was shot. The film's title was selected through a contest advertised in Marvel Comics. The winning title, Comic Book Confidential, was based on a suggestion by Spiegelman, Comics Confidential.

Due to running time constraints, Mann couldn't include footage with Scrooge McDuck creator Carl Barks, All American Comics editor Julius "Julie" Schwartz, and editor of the first all-woman comic book It Ain't Me Babe, Trina Robbins.

=== Editing ===
Steve Weslak, who did sound editing for Listen to the City, edited the film. He stated that his experience editing the film was "very, very, negative" due to Mann not knowing how to organize his work. They planned on giving the film a chronological structure, but Mann would "look at it and decide he didn't like it" according to Weslak. Mann wanted the film to have a vertical aspect ratio, rather than the normal 1:1.85 ratio, in order to look like a comic book.

The first rough cut, running at four hours, was completed in October 1986. Haig fell asleep during the first screening of this version. Mann, Weslak, and Robert Kennedy edited the film for another two months and reduced the second rough cut to three hours. Mann fired Weslak after the third rough cut. Editing continued for another year after Mann fired Weslak.

Ellen Besen supervised the animation sequences. The film initially had twenty minutes of animatics, but another twenty minutes were requested due to the length of the interviews. Mann did not have a plan for what these additional animatics would be according to Besen and she criticized him for not understanding story boards. The "whole production was spinning out of control" by March 1987 according to Besen. Haig and Harbury were occupied with other projects and Besen was unable to contact Mann. She was fired after returning from a wedding and week-long vacation. Mann sought help from art directors Gerlinde Scharinger and Steven Lewis after firing Besen, but did most of the work according to himself.

== Release ==
The film was released by Cineplex Odeon Films in Canada and Cinecom Pictures in the United States. It premiered in two Canadian theatres and the Toronto Festival of Festivals on 23 September 1988. Mann said that he personally spent $60,000 on promotional materials. $3,300 was earned in the one-week run at the Canada Square theatre and $13,768 in the five-week run of the other theatre. Jeff Sackman, vice-president of Cineplex-Odeon, said more people watched the film at the two Toronto Festival of Festivals screenings than during its theatrical release in Toronto. There were short theatrical runs in Vancouver, Kitchener, Hamilton, Ottawa, Windsor, Montreal, and Halifax that earned a few thousand dollars.

Mann showed the film at the Independent Filmmaker Project and received distribution offers from Cinecom, Miramax, New Line Cinema, and HBO. New Line Cinema, Miramax, and Ben Barenholtz withdrew their offers after Mann requested a $350,000 advance. Barenholtz stated that the film would perform better on home media rather than in theaters. Mann sold the rights to Cinecom for $80,000 as he they distributed films from John Sayles, Jonathan Demme, and Ira Deutchman. Mann claimed that HBO offered $500,000, but he declined as he wanted a theatrical release. Deutchman left Cinecom one week after Mann sold the rights and the company later filed for bankruptcy. The film opened at the Film Forum on 14 June 1989, and was shown in forty cities. The net theatrical revenue was $37,344, $13,029 in Canada and $24,236 in foreign markets, causing a loss of $155,656.

It was also shown at the 39th Berlin International Film Festival. It was one of the first films to be released in CD-ROM format for home computer viewing (as a forerunner of the 2002 DVD), with 120 pages of comics and the complete Comics Code. The CD-ROM received positive reviews from USA Today in 1994 and The Complete Idiots Guide to CD-ROM in 1995.

== Reception and legacy ==
Brian D. Johnson, writing in Maclean's, praised the film as "dazzling" and that Mann brought "static images to life with vivid editing and camera movement".

Caryn James of The New York Times found the film deft and intelligent—it "takes off when it abandons the archives and focuses on the creators," but "it plays to the converted," and its attempt to relate comics to social context is "fleeting." Desson Howe, in the Washington Post, wrote that the film was "a pleasure," and engaging throughout. Christopher Null at MovieCritic.com found the comics themselves the least interesting, and the interviews the "real joy" of the film. Peter Rist described the film in 2001 as "Mann's greatest success, both critically and popularly."

The film received the 1989 Genie Award for Best Feature Length Documentary from the Academy of Canadian Cinema and Television.

== Works cited ==
- Posner, Michael (1993). Canadian Dreams: The Making and Marketing of Independent Films. Canadian Independent Film Caucus. ISBN 1550541145.
