= O Superman =

Single by Laurie Anderson

from the album Big Science
- B-side: "Walk the Dog"
- Released: October 9, 1981 (UK)
- Recorded: 1981, The Lobby, New York City
- Genre: Electronic; art pop; new wave; experimental pop; minimalism; systems music; avant-pop
- Length: 8:21
- Label: Warner Bros.
- Songwriter: Laurie Anderson
- Producer: Laurie Anderson

Laurie Anderson singles chronology
"O Superman" (1981)	"Sharkey's Day" (1984)

Official video
- "O Superman" on YouTube

"O Superman" (parenthetically known as "O Superman (For Massenet)" in tribute to Jules Massenet) is the 1981 debut single by American artist Laurie Anderson. A pop song rooted in minimalist and electronic music, the song became a surprise hit in the United Kingdom after it was championed by DJ John Peel, rising to number 2 on the UK Singles Chart in 1981. Prior to the success of this song, Anderson was little known outside the art world. First released as a promotional single, the song appeared on her debut album Big Science (1982) and as part of her live album United States Live (1984).

In the 1981 Village Voice Pazz & Jop poll headed by Robert Christgau, critics voted "O Superman" the best single of the year.

== Music ==
In writing the song, Anderson drew from the aria "Ô Souverain, ô juge, ô père" ("O Sovereign, O Judge, O Father") from Jules Massenet's 1885 opera Le Cid, that she had heard in the voice of tenor Charles Holland. The first lines ("O Superman / O Judge / O Mom and Dad") and the title of the song echo the aria. Susan McClary suggests in her book Feminine Endings that "O Superman" may also have been inspired by Massenet's 1902 opera Le jongleur de Notre-Dame.

Anderson's lead vocals are overlaid on a sparse background of two alternating chords formed by the repeated spoken syllable "ha" created by looping with an Eventide Harmonizer. A Roland VP-330 vocoder was used on Anderson's voice to sound "like a Greek chorus". A saxophone is heard as the song fades out, and a flute line and sample of bird calls appear at various points within the track. The two chords of the song are A♭ major and C minor, the repeating "ha" syllable acting as a harmonic drone on C.

== Lyrics ==
O souverain, O juge, O père!
The song "O Superman" is based on the aria "O souverain, O juge, O père!", from Jules Massenet's opera Le Cid, here sung by Enrico Caruso in 1916.

The song's introduction consists of a repetition of the "O Superman / O Judge / O Mom and Dad" stanza. The rest of the song's lyrics are loosely structured around a one-sided conversation. At first, the voice leaves a message claiming to be the narrator's mother, and asks the narrator if they are coming home. The voice then identifies itself as "the hand that takes" and informs the narrator that the "American planes" are coming. The song concludes with the stanza "When love is gone, there's always justice / and when justice is gone, there's always force / and when force is gone, there's always mom", with the narrator pleading to be held in her mom's long petrochemical, military, electronic arms.

As part of the larger work United States, the text addresses issues of technology and communication, quoting answering machine messages and the United States Postal Service motto "Neither snow nor rain nor gloom of night shall stay these couriers from the swift completion of their appointed rounds". In a 2022 60 Minutes interview, Anderson summarized the song as being about how "technology cannot save you".

The lines "'Cause when love is gone, there's always justice / And when justice is gone, there's always force / And when force is gone, there's always Mom" derive from the fourth sentence of Chapter 38 of the Tao Te Ching: "When Tao is lost, there is goodness. When goodness is lost, there is kindness. When kindness is lost, there is justice. When justice is lost, there is ritual. Now ritual is the husk of faith and loyalty, the beginning of confusion."

In an interview with the Australian magazine Bulletin in 2003, Anderson erroneously stated that the song was connected to the Iran–Contra affair, but she had meant to refer to the earlier Iran hostage crisis and the failure of Operation Eagle Claw in 1980.

== Release ==
The song was first released as a single by One Ten Records at the encouragement of its owner, B. George. 1,000 copies of the single were initially pressed, which Anderson sold from her apartment by individually wrapping the single and distributing it via mail.

John Peel frequently played "O Superman" on BBC Radio 1 and a British distribution company later requested 80,000 copies of the single. Warner Bros. agreed to handle the single's distribution at the request of Anderson and released the single in October 1981 with "Walk the Dog" as the B-side. "O Superman" reached number two on the UK Singles Chart and was ranked among the top ten "Tracks of the Year" for 1981 by NME. After the song's unexpected popularity, Anderson signed an eight album record deal with Warner Records, which reissued the single and released her debut album Big Science in 1982. A live version of the song also appears on Anderson's 1984 live album United States Live. "O Superman" did not appeal to all listeners. According to the 1982 book The Rock Lists Album, compiled by John Tobler and Allan Jones, polls conducted by several unidentified British newspapers saw "O Superman" voted readers' least favourite hit single of 1981.

Although Anderson had dropped the song from her performance repertoire almost two decades earlier, she revived the piece in 2001 during a concert tour that included a retrospective look at some of her older pieces, an idea conceived by her romantic partner Lou Reed. A live performance of "O Superman" was recorded in New York City shortly after the September 11 attacks, which some, including Anderson, felt gave the song's lyrics a new topical resonance. This performance would appear on Anderson's 2002 album Live in New York.

The B-side of the original single was a spoken word piece titled "Walk the Dog", which would also appear on United States Live. The studio version of the track was included on the Warner Bros. compilation Attack of the Killer B's (1983), but was never issued on any Anderson album until the twenty-fifth anniversary reissue of Big Science in 2007. By 1984, "O Superman" had sold 800,000 copies worldwide.

== Recording details ==
Words and music written by Laurie Anderson.

=== Musicians ===
- Laurie Anderson – vocals, Roland VP-330
- Roma Baran – Farfisa organ, Casio keyboard
- Perry Hoberman – flute, saxophone

=== Technical ===
- Producer: Laurie Anderson and Roma Baran
- Assistant producer: Perry Hoberman
- Engineer: Roma Baran
- Lacquer Cut (mastering engineer): Bill Kipper at Masterdisk
- Recorded and mixed at The Lobby (Laurie Anderson's home recording studio), New York City, 1981

== Charts ==
Chart (1981)	Peak position
Australia (Kent Music Report)	28
Belgium (Ultratop 50 Flanders)	19
Netherlands (Dutch Top 40)	9
Netherlands (Single Top 100)	10
Ireland (IRMA)	11
New Zealand (Recorded Music NZ)	21
South Africa (Springbok Radio)	16
UK Singles (Official Charts)	2

=== Year-end charts ===
Chart (1981)	Position
Netherlands (Single Top 100)	93

== In popular culture ==
The Italian Ministry of Health used the song in a series of public service announcements on HIV prevention from 1988 to the early '90s.

The 2018 interactive film Black Mirror: Bandersnatch includes an ending scored by "O Superman".

In November 2023, an audio clip from "O Superman", centered on the lyrics "Well, you don't know me / But I know you", went viral as a sound on TikTok. The song debuted at number 12 on the TikTok Billboard Top 50 and was the highest debut for the week dated 9 December 2023.
