= Len Blum =

Canadian screenwriter, filmmaker, and composer

- Born: Leonard Solomon Blum; December 29, 1951 (age 74); Montreal, Quebec, Canada
- Occupations: Musician, composer, screenwriter, yoga teacher, filmmaker
- Years active: 1979–present
- Spouse: Heather Munroe-Blum (m. 1970)
- Children: 1

Leonard Solomon Blum (born December 29, 1951) is a Canadian screenwriter, filmmaker and film composer.

== Early life ==
Blum was born into a Jewish family. He attended Westdale Secondary School in Hamilton, Ontario. He later graduated from McMaster University with a Bachelor of Arts in 1975.

== Career ==
He has written many films, specializing in comedy, including Meatballs, Stripes, Heavy Metal, Spacehunter: Adventures in the Forbidden Zone, Beethoven's 2nd, Private Parts, The Pink Panther remake and Over the Hedge. Prior to his film career, early on he was a rock musician and songwriter did studio productions, produced radio commercials.

In 2015, the Toronto International Film Festival created a screenwriter's residency program named after Blum, specifically for up and coming Canadian screenwriters to develop their projects. The inaugural resident was Stephen Dunn. In 2016, Andrew Cividino was announced as the new resident.

== Accolades ==
He won the Genie Award for Best Original Screenplay, in 1980, for the film Meatballs.

== Personal life ==
He has been married to Heather Munroe-Blum since 1970, with whom he has a daughter, Sydney.

== Filmography ==
- Meatballs (with Dan Goldberg and Harold Ramis) (1979)
- Stripes (with Dan Goldberg and Harold Ramis) (1981)
- Heavy Metal (with Dan Goldberg) (1981)
- Spacehunter: Adventures in the Forbidden Zone (with Dan Goldberg) (1983)
- Feds (with Dan Goldberg) (1988)
- Beethoven's 2nd (1993)
- Dream Tower (with Ron Mann and Bill Schroeder) (1994)
- Private Parts (1997)
- The Pink Panther (with Steve Martin) (2006)
- Over the Hedge (with Lorne Cameron, David Hoselton, and Karey Kirkpatrick) (2006)
- Altman (2014)
- Summer of Love (2018)
- Carmine Street Guitars (2018) directed by Ron Mann
