= Daniel Goldberg (producer) =

Canadian film producer and screenwriter (1948/1949 – 2023)

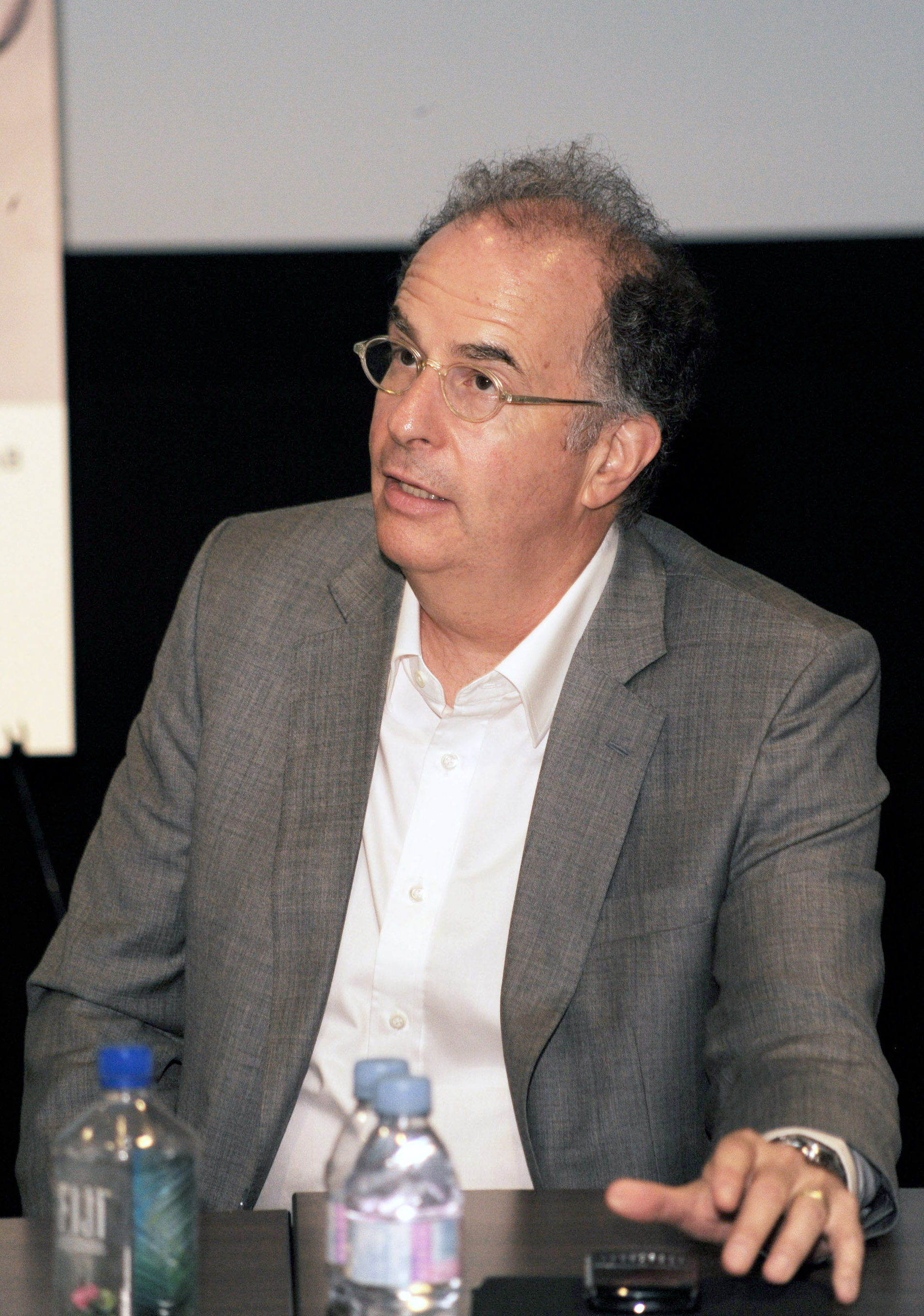
- Goldberg in 2011
- Born: March 7, 1949; Hamilton, Ontario, Canada
- Died: July 12, 2023 (aged 74); Los Angeles, California, U.S.
- Education: McMaster University
- Occupations: Film producer; screenwriter; film director
- Spouse: Ilona Herzberg
- Relatives: Amy Goldberg (sibling); Harris Goldberg (sibling)

Daniel Mitchell Goldberg (March 7, 1949 – July 12, 2023) was a Canadian film producer and screenwriter. He was a writer and producer on the films Meatballs (1979) and Stripes (1981). He was also a producer of The Hangover film series and received an Emmy Awards nomination for the film The Late Shift (1996).

== Career ==
Goldberg met Ivan Reitman in 1966 while studying at McMaster University. He starred in the 1968 short film Orientation which was written and directed by Reitman. In 1969, he became a board member of the McMaster Film Board alongside Reitman, Eugene Levy and Dennis Matheson. The same year, Reitman and Goldberg collaborated to produce a film titled Columbus of Sex, directed by John Hofsess and based on the pornographic memoir My Secret Life. The three were arrested and charged for making and exhibiting an obscene film. Reitman and Goldberg were found guilty, being sentenced to one year of probation and a CA$300 fine.

Goldberg worked together with Reitman for more than 30 years. Their collaborations included Death Weekend (1976), Heavy Metal (1981), Feds (1988), Junior (1994), Space Jam (1996), Private Parts (1997), Commandments (1997), Fathers' Day (1997), Six Days, Seven Nights (1998), Road Trip (2000), Evolution (2001), Killing Me Softly (2002), Old School (2003) and EuroTrip (2004).

Goldberg first found success with the 1979 film Meatballs which was directed by Reitman and starred Bill Murray. He co-wrote the film with Len Blum, Janis Allen and Harold Ramis, and was also a producer. Goldberg would return to the franchise in 1987 as a writer on Meatballs III: Summer Job. He would again collaborate with Blum and Ramis to co-write the 1981 film Stripes which was directed by Reitman and starred Murray and Ramis, with Goldberg also serving as a producer. Goldberg and Blum co-wrote the film Feds which was also directed by Goldberg.

Goldberg found success with his producing career after the mid-1990s. He served as an executive producer on the animated TV shows Beethoven and Extreme Ghostbusters, and was nominated for an Emmy Award for the 1996 television film The Late Shift on which he served as a co-executive producer. He was also a producer on all three films of The Hangover series.

== Personal life and death ==
Daniel was born to Irwin and Audrey Goldberg in Hamilton, Ontario, Canada. His siblings included Harris Goldberg, Amy Goldberg and Kathryn Hogg. He was married to Ilona Herzberg.

He died in Los Angeles on July 12, 2023, at the age of 74.

== Filmography ==
=== Film ===
Year	Title	Producer	Executive Producer	Writer	Director(s)
1969	The Columbus of Sex	Yes	No	No	John Hofsess & Leland R. Thomas
1973	Cannibal Girls	Yes	No	Yes	Ivan Reitman
1979	Meatballs	Yes	No	Yes	Ivan Reitman
1981	Stripes	Yes	No	Yes	Ivan Reitman
1981	Heavy Metal	No	No	Yes	Gerald Potterton
1983	Spacehunter: Adventures in the Forbidden Zone	No	No	Yes	Lamont Johnson
1988	Feds	No	No	Yes	Himself
1994	Junior	No	Yes	No	Ivan Reitman
1996	Space Jam	Yes	No	No	Joe Pytka
1997	Private Parts	No	Yes	No	Betty Thomas
1997	Commandments	Yes	No	No	Daniel Taplitz
1997	Father's Day	No	Yes	No	Ivan Reitman
1998	Six Days Seven Nights	No	Yes	No	Ivan Reitman
2000	Road Trip	Yes	No	No	Todd Phillips
2001	Evolution	Yes	No	No	Ivan Reitman
2002	Killing Me Softly	No	Yes	No	Chen Kaige
2003	Old School	Yes	No	No	Todd Phillips
2004	EuroTrip	Yes	No	No	Jeff Schaffer
2006	School for Scoundrels	Yes	No	No	Todd Phillips
2009	The Hangover	Yes	No	No	Todd Phillips
2010	Due Date	Yes	No	No	Todd Phillips
2011	The Hangover Part II	Yes	No	No	Todd Phillips
2013	The Hangover Part III	Yes	No	No	Todd Phillips
2018	Food Fighter	Yes	No	No	Himself

Other credits
Year	Title	Role	Notes
1968	Orientation	Second unit director and actor	Directed by Ivan Reitman; short film
1973	Cannibal Girls	Editor	
1976	Death Weekend / The House by the Lake	Sound supervisor	
1981	Heavy Metal	Post-production supervisor	
1994	Junior	Second unit director	

=== Television ===
Year	Title	Role	Notes
1983	Battle of the Network Stars XIV	Program coordinator: Trans World International	Television special
1994	Beethoven	Executive producer	26 episodes
1996	The Late Shift	Co-executive producer	Television film
1997–1998	Mummies Alive!	Executive producer	4 episodes
1997	Extreme Ghostbusters	Executive producer	40 episodes
2001–2002	Alienators: Evolution Continues	Executive producer	25 episodes
