= Charles Lippincott =

Charles Lippincott may refer to:

- Charles E. Lippincott, politician
- Charley Lippincott, publicist
