= You're the Guy I Want to Share My Money With =

Studio album by Laurie Anderson / John Giorno / William S. Burroughs
- Released: 1981
- Genres: Avant-garde, experimental, pop
- Label: Giorno Poetry Systems
- Producers: John Giorno; Greg Shifrin

You're the Guy I Want to Share My Money With is a double album released in 1981. The album is a collaboration by Laurie Anderson, John Giorno and William S. Burroughs, recorded during their "Red Night" spoken word tour of 1981. Released through Giorno Poetry Systems Institute, the album was funded in part by grants from the National Endowment for the Arts and the New York State Council on the Arts. Most of Anderson's material came from her performance piece, United States, and live versions of some tracks, such as "It Was Up in the Mountains", would also be included in her later 5-LP release, United States Live. This was Anderson's first substantial album release (previously she had only contributed a track or two), and she followed this in 1982 with her first full solo album, Big Science.

== Track listing ==
The original 1981 2-LP set:

Side 1:

1. Laurie Anderson - "Dr. Miller" (4:22)
2. Laurie Anderson - "It Was Up in the Mountains" (2:49)
3. Laurie Anderson - "Drums" (0:30)
4. Laurie Anderson - "Closed Circuits" (7:26)
5. Laurie Anderson - "Born, Never Asked" (4:30)

Side 2:

1. John Giorno - "I Don't Need It, I Don't Want It, and You Cheated Me Out of It" (10:35)
2. John Giorno - "Completely Attached to Delusion" (7:52)

Side 3:

1. William S. Burroughs - "Introducing John Stanley Hart" (2:19)
2. William S. Burroughs - "Twilight's Last Gleamings" (2:48)
3. William S. Burroughs - "My Protagonist Kim Carson" (4:56)
4. William S. Burroughs - "The Do Rights" (3:37)
5. William S. Burroughs - "Salt Chunk Mary" (4:14)
6. William S. Burroughs - "Progressive Education" (7:10)
7. William S. Burroughs - "The Wild Fruits" (2:24)
8. William S. Burroughs - "The Unworthy Vessel" (2:45)

Side 4 of this double album is multi-grooved. Depending on where the needle lands on the record, one of the following will play:

1. Laurie Anderson - "For Electronic Dogs / Structuralist Filmmaking / Drums" (4:52)
2. William S. Burroughs - "The Name is Clem Snide / Mr. Hart Couldn't Hear the Word Death" (5:04)
3. John Giorno - excerpt from "Put Your Ear to Stone & Open Your Heart to the Sky" (5:03)

You're the Guy I Want to Share My Money With was also released on cassette and featured the full 18:33 version of "Put Your Ear to Stone & Open Your Heart to the Sky" alongside the two additional songs on Side 4 of the vinyl. A CD version was later released through Minneapolis-based label East Side Digital, which acquired the Giorno Poetry Systems catalog in 1993. The CD featured the following track list:

1. Laurie Anderson - "Born, Never Asked" (4:31)
2. Laurie Anderson - "Closed Circuits" (7:27)
3. Laurie Anderson - "Dr. Miller" (4:22)
4. Laurie Anderson - "It Was Up in the Mountains" (2:13)
5. Laurie Anderson - "For Electronic Dogs" (3:08)
6. Laurie Anderson - "Structuralist Filmmaking" (1:10)
7. Laurie Anderson - "Drums" (0:34)
8. William S. Burroughs - "Introducing John Stanley Hart; He Entered the Bar with the Best of Intentions" (2:23)
9. William S. Burroughs - "Twilight's Last Gleamings" (2:51)
10. William S. Burroughs - "My Protagonist Kim Carson" (4:56)
11. William S. Burroughs - "Salt Chunk Mary; Like Mr. Hart, Kim Has a Dark Side to His Character" (4:13)
12. William S. Burroughs - "Progressive Education" (7:13)
13. William S. Burroughs - "The Wild Fruits" (2:26)
14. William S. Burroughs - "The Unworthy Vessel" (2:45)
15. William S. Burroughs - "The Name is Clem Snide" (2:03)
16. William S. Burroughs - "Mr. Hart Couldn't Hear the Word Death" (2:54)
17. John Giorno - "I Don't Need It, I Don't Want It, and You Cheated Me Out of It" (10:40)
18. John Giorno - "Completely Attached to Delusion" (7:47)

Two tracks from the original 2-LP set were not included on the CD: William S. Burroughs' "The Do Rights" (later included on Mouth Almighty's 1998 compilation box set The Best of William S. Burroughs from Giorno Poetry Systems) and John Giorno's "excerpt from Put Your Ear to Stone & Open Your Heart to the Sky," which is not included in any later release.
