= Multisided record =

Type of vinyl record

A multisided record is a type of vinyl record that has more than one groove per side. This technique allows hidden tracks to be encoded on LPs, 45 rpms and 78 rpms. On a disc that has a multi-groove, whether the listener plays the main track or the hidden track depends on where the stylus is cued.

The most frequently cited example of a multiple-groove record is Monty Python's infamous "three-sided" Matching Tie and Handkerchief album, issued in 1973. One side of the album (both sides were labeled "Side 2") was "normal"; the other contained a pair of grooves, each of which held different material (later pressings of the record did not include the double groove).

Another memorable example of a multiple-groove recording was the 1980 flexi disc entitled It's a Super-Spectacular Day issued by MAD magazine. The disc played a standard introductory section about the start of a wonderful, "super-spectacular" day, then produced one of several different comedic "bad" endings to that day, involving such topics as alien abduction, zits, street violence, and the horrors of a visiting mother-in-law.

Other uses to which multiple-groove recordings have been put include various games (such as horse races or mystery games) where the outcome is determined by which of the record's multiple grooves is played.

== Examples ==
Some records to have incorporated this feature include:

- So-called Puzzle Plates produced by the Gramophone Company in London in 1898 and 1899: these were discs with two interleaved tracks, issued as E5504, 9290, 9296. Their most famous was a three-track Puzzle Plate (9317) recorded in January 1901 and given as the prize for a competition, for which several master recordings had to be made, distinguished by suffix letters against the catalogue number.
- One of the earliest examples of a three-track side was a 1901 Pre-Dog Victor A-821 Fortune Telling Record. This is a multi-Track disc with three recording tracks that go all the way through the record. It is titled "Fortune Telling Puzzle Record a song and two Fortunes, See if you can find them."
- "The Fortune Teller Song", a 1951 single by the Fontane Sisters (RCA Victor 4106), contained four different versions of the song, each with a different ending.
- "Laura Scudder's Magic Record", a 1969 record produced by George Garabedian's Mark 56 Records and offered as a promotional give-away by Laura Scudder's Potato Chips. Each side contained three different songs that would play at random depending upon the drop of the stylus.
- "The Monty Python Matching Tie and Handkerchief" (1973), on its original pressing one of the LP's "side two"'s had twin grooves, thus making a three-sided LP.
- Some editions of The Goodies' "The Funky Gibbon" single (1975) have a double grooved title track with alternative codas.
- A special 12" version of M's single "Pop Muzik" (1979) features "Pop Muzik" and "M Factor" on one side. The single was credited on its cover as "The first 'Double Groove' single", although this claim is questionable.
- John Cooper Clarke's 7" Splat/Twat S EPC 7982 (1979) has Twat (live recording) and Splat (censored version) on two grooves on the A side.
- Henny Youngman's 128 Greatest Jokes, a 1980 Rhino Records LP, featured four-track mastering that allowed for a different random selection of Youngman's jokes to be heard each time the album was played. Rhino promoted the gimmick as "Trick-Track" recording.
- The Original single release of Saigon by Martha and the Muffins features a double grooved B-side of 'Copacabana', where one groove plays the song backwards while the former plays it regularly.
- The LP You're the Guy I Want to Share My Money With (1981), featuring a "three-track" side: each track contained a different recording of the title song, alternately performed by Laurie Anderson, William S. Burroughs, or John Giorno.
- The 12" single "Catalogue Clothes" (1986) by World Domination Enterprises has a double groove on the B-side. The two tracks are different mixes of "Dans Une Ville.
- Basia's 1987 10" Promises/Give me That has two grooves, Groove A is Promises (French Mix) and Groove 2 is Give me That. What makes it more special is it is on white vinyl.
- The 10" single of Alexander O'Neal's "Criticize" (1987), features two versions of the title song on side A.
- A special 12" version of The Sugarcubes' single "Birthday" (1988) features one groove containing "Christmas Eve" and the other containing "Christmas Day"; both are different recordings of "Birthday" featuring The Jesus and Mary Chain.
- The 12" single of Me Myself and I (1989) by De La Soul.
- The 12" single of Kate Bush's "The Sensual World" (1989), with one track containing the standard vocal version and the other playing an instrumental version.
- The 10" single of the Fine Young Cannibals' "Good Thing" (1989), which held two different mixes of the same song.
- The 12" version of Tool's "Opiate" EP (1992) features one track that will play either "The Gaping Lotus Experience" or "Cold and Ugly (Live)" depending on where the stylus is placed.
- The double-LP release of Marillion's 1994 concept album Brave featured a double groove on the second side of the second record. The first groove played the regular track listing ("The Great Escape" and "Made Again"), while the second played only an alternate version of "The Great Escape" with different lyrics, presenting an alternate ending to the album's narrative.
- The Record Store Day 2011 exclusive 10-inch single of “Things Change” by Dom features a double-grooved A side that plays a different song depending on where the stylus is placed. Both tracks are listed on the label.
- The LP version of Disco Volante (1995) by the avant-garde metal band Mr. Bungle contained a hidden groove during "Sleep Part II: Carry Stress In The Jaw" with an untitled hidden song.
- The 7" version of Garbage's 1995 single "Only Happy When It Rains" features a double groove on the side B. Depending on where the stylus is placed, it plays either "Girl Don't Come" or "Sleep".
- Scntfc's 2012 7" vinyl album "Sword & Sworcery: Moon Grotto 7" had a double groove containing a secret audio message.
- The 12" version of the album Behind the Sun (2014) by Motorpsycho contains two instrumental tracks that are cut in parallel such that the stylus will randomly play one of the two songs.
- Jack White's album Lazaretto (2014) has a double groove featuring two unique intros to the same song, one acoustic and one electric.
- The UK based Electro-jazz band, "1201_Alarm" released their début album, "Hello_World" in 2020, which has two tracks on side 4 that are cut in parallel such that the stylus will randomly play one of the two. Each track contains an interview with a prominent scientist and a remix of earlier tracks from the album and does not appear on digital releases.
- The B-side of the 2025 concept album "Journey To Voltus B" by UK rock band HENGE also features parallel grooves, resulting in different endings to the album depending on which of the two grooves is played.
