= Irvine Welsh's Ecstasy =

- UK Poster
- Directed by: Rob Heydon
- Screenplay by: Rob Heydon; Ben Tucker
- Based on: The Undefeated by Irvine Welsh
- Produced by: Rob Heydon
- Starring: Adam Sinclair; Kristin Kreuk; Billy Boyd; Carlo Rota
- Narrated by: Adam Sinclair
- Cinematography: Brad Hruboska
- Edited by: Jeremiah Munce
- Music by: Craig McConnell
- Production company: Ecstasy Film Inc.
- Distributed by: Proteus Entertainment; Potential Films
- Release dates: September 18, 2011 (AFF); November 23, 2012 (Canada)
- Running time: 99 minutes
- Country: Canada
- Language: English
- Budget: $1 million

Irvine Welsh's Ecstasy is a 2011 Canadian film adaptation of the short story "The Undefeated" from the best-selling book Ecstasy by Irvine Welsh. Directed by Rob Heydon, the film stars Adam Sinclair as Lloyd Buist, a drug user who smuggles ecstasy from Amsterdam. Kristin Kreuk plays his love interest, Heather Thompson.

== Plot ==
Frustrated with her boring middle class and loveless marriage, Heather Thompson (Kristin Kreuk) seeks a change in her life. At a club, she finds just that in happily partying Lloyd Buist (Adam Sinclair), a drug user. Heather falls hard for Lloyd despite the fact that most of their time spent together is under the influence of illicit substances. As they experiment with this new lifestyle, they are faced with the question of whether they love their drugs, each other, or are just drugged into loving each other.

The romantic storyline is supplemented by a side plot involving Lloyd owing money to a shady character, Solo (Carlo Rota). While Lloyd is out of control with drugs and left unchecked, he must fulfill his "karmic" debt with Solo.

After a while, Heather begins to doubt the veracity of Lloyd's feelings for her, wondering if it might not be the effect of the drugs after all. When Lloyd almost dies after a drug smuggling operation goes terribly wrong and faces the possibility of losing Heather, he decides to turn his life around, and he finds that natural highs might be the best of all. He wants to change, but first must deal with Solo.

== Cast ==
- Adam Sinclair as Lloyd Buist
- Kristin Kreuk as Heather Thompson
- Billy Boyd as Woodsy
- Carlo Rota as Solo
- Keram Malicki-Sánchez as Ally
- Ashley Pover as The Big Man
- Natalie Brown as Marie
- Stephen McHattie as Jim Buist, Lloyd's father
- Dean McDermott as Hugh Thompson

== Production ==
In 2000, director Rob Heydon obtained the rights to the film Irvine Welsh's Ecstasy. It took a few years to acquire financing and to get the script approved by author Irvine Welsh. There were difficulties in having the independent film made; the film was initially a Canada/UK co-production up until 2010, but eventually became a Canadian production. The lead female character Heather was initially supposed to be played by actress Lisa Ray, but she was unable to commit due to having cancer.

The film was shot from December 2010 to early 2011 in Scotland, Amsterdam, and Canada (including Sault Ste. Marie, Ontario).

== Release ==
Coincidentally, there was another independent film entitled Ecstasy that came out in 2011. The premiere of Irvine Welsh's Ecstasy was held at the Atlantic Film Festival in Halifax, Nova Scotia, Canada, on September 18, 2011 and Kristin Kreuk, Adam Sinclair, Billy Boyd, and Rob Heydon were present. In September during the week of its premiere, the film was sold to 20 countries, including Portugal, South Africa, territories in Central America, the Czech Republic and Eastern Europe.

The film had its International premiere at the Glasgow Film Festival on February 18, 2012 where author Irvine Welsh was present. Its London premiere was held at Ministry of Sound on April 17, 2012 where Sinclair, Rota, Boyd, Andrup, Welsh and Heydon attended. The film opened on April 20, 2012 and was released in over 50 theatres in the United Kingdom.

The film was released in select theatres in Australia and New Zealand on April 25, 2012. The film had a limited theatrical release in Canada from November 23, 2012 to December 6, 2012 in Toronto at the Projection Booth Metro and East.

=== Marketing ===
Mark Blamire, who was also involved with the original marketing campaign of Trainspotting, was hired to do the graphic design and marketing for Irvine Welsh's Ecstasy as well.

Teaser trailers were released on the film's YouTube channel throughout late mid-to-late 2011 with the final UK trailer being released in early 2012. Dollena Campbell, through her company We Are Enchanted, spearheaded Outreach and Social Media Production for "Irvine Welsh's Ecstasy" to help spread the word on the film. She aided in PR aspects necessary to receive reviews from websites. Dollena aided in cultivating a supportive fan base with developed incentives and contests promoted to generate buzz for the film. Dollena also aided in much needed fundraising to reach critical objectives in the final stages of post production. There were also many contests on the film's Twitter and Facebook pages, giving away prize packs and trips to premieres. Prior to the London premiere, there were film posters in Glasgow and London Underground stations. From May to July 2012, there was an IndieGoGo campaign accepting donations from the public to help get the movie screened worldwide and the funds helped to assist with film distribution.

=== Awards and nominations ===
Irvine Welsh's Ecstasy was the recipient of awards at various film festivals:

- Sacramento International Film Festival 2012: Outstanding Foreign Feature.
- Catalina Film Festival 2012: Best Feature.
- Honolulu Film Awards 2012: Grand Jury Prize.
- Pennine Film Festival 2012 (UK): Best Narrative Feature.
- Charleston International Film Festival 2012: Best Feature Jury Award.
- Mexico International Film Festival 2012: Best Foreign Feature.
- Milan International Film Festival 2012: Best Cinematography.
- Big Island Film Festival 2012: Best Foreign Feature.
- Milan International Film Festival 2012: Best Film (Nomination).
- British Independent Film Festival 2012: Best Film (Nomination).
- Litchfield Hills Film Festival 2012: Best Foreign Film.
- Burbank Film Festival 2012: Best Foreign Feature.
- Lady Filmmakers Film Festival 2012: Best Feature Film.

=== Critical reception ===
At the weeks of its United Kingdom and Australia releases, the film received a general negative reception garnering 15% approval from 20 critics – an average rating of 3.6 out of 10 – on review aggregate website Rotten Tomatoes.

There were favourable reviews: Dave Griffiths of Buzz Magazine gave the film 5 stars writing, "Irvine Welsh’s Ecstasy is an absolute ripper of a film. With some great acting and one of the best scripts to surface for a while this film is an absolute must see… and you’ll be talking about for a long time to come." Evan Williams of The Australian gave the film 3.5 stars out of 4 saying, "Ecstasy comes with the full bag of cinematic tricks.... The film delivers a powerful and plausible climax." Rob Salem of The Toronto Star gave the film 3 stars out of 4 saying, "Irvine Welsh's Ecstasy is to ecstasy what Trainspotting was to heroin."

Negative reviews came from critics who noted comparisons to Trainspotting: Robbie Collin of The Daily Telegraph criticized the film saying Irvine Welsh's Ecstasy not only "... goes on to reuse images and ideas not only from Boyle’s scabrous 1996 sensation (Trainspotting), but also the clutch of vastly inferior drug culture films that followed it." Eddie Harrison of The List stated that "... this is most definitely not Irvine Welsh’s Ecstasy, but an agonisingly watered-down imitation, a long, languid come-down after the frenetic buzz of Trainspotting." Tim Evans of Sky Movies wrote that "Heydon's no Danny Boyle and, although this shares many superfluous similarities with Trainspotting, it's as dated as warehouse parties and irritating smiley faces."

=== Box office ===
On the opening weekend, Irvine Welsh's Ecstasy grossed £26,487 in 56 theatres in the United Kingdom.

=== Home media ===
The film was released on DVD, Blu-ray Disc and iTunes in the United Kingdom on August 20, 2012. The film reached #1 on iTunes the weekend of release. The DVD and Blu-ray was released in Australia on September 5, 2012. Deleted scenes are included on the DVD and includes author Irvine Welsh's cameo that was not included in the actual film.

Ecstasy was released in the United States and Canada on November 21, 2012 via video on demand. Ecstasy has since been released on iTunes as of late November 2012. The DVD was released in North America on May 21, 2013.

== Music ==
=== Beautiful World (Single) ===
The single "Beautiful World" by Tiësto and Mark Knight was released on an "Ecstasy Remixes" maxi-single on April 30, 2012 by "Toolroom Records". A music video was released as well.

No.	Title	Composers	Length
1.	"Beautiful World (Ecstasy Radio Edit)"	Knight, Tiësto, Dino	3:06
2.	"Beautiful World (Original Club Mix)"	Knight, Tiësto, Dino	7:49
3.	"Beautiful World (Laidback Luke Remix)"	Knight, Tiësto, Dino, Laidback Luke	6:59
4.	"Beautiful World (Michael Woods Remix)"	Michael Woods, Knight, Tiësto, Dino	6:53
5.	"Beautiful World (Gina Star Remix)"	Knight, Tiësto, Dino	6:12
6.	"Beautiful World (Torqux Remix)"	Knight, Tiësto, Dino, Torqux	4:27
7.	"Beautiful World (Tom Staar & Sam Young Remix)"	Knight, Tiësto, Dino, Sam Young, Tom Staar	6:45
8.	"Beautiful World (Violet Oversoul Remix)"	Knight, Tiësto, Dino, Violet Oversoul	5:15

=== Official Movie Soundtrack ===
Irvine Welsh's Ecstasy - Official Movie Soundtrack

Studio album by Various artists
- Released: May 14, 2012 / August 20, 2012
- Genre: Soundtrack
- Length: 59:31 / 78:29
- Label: Ecstasy Film Inc
- Producer: Craig McConnell

An album was released on May 14, 2012.

No.	Title	Performer(s)	Length
1.	"Inflection"	Craig McConnell	4:21
2.	"Beautiful World (Ecstasy Soundtrack Version)"	Tiësto & Mark Knight feat. Dino	3:01
3.	"Altara"	Adam Nickey	8:49
4.	"Broadband"	Craig McConnell	4:18
5.	"Tokyo"	Paul Oakenfold	7:25
6.	"The Mule"	Craig McConnell	1:05
7.	"Escapology"	DDA	5:28
8.	"Solo"	Craig McConnell	1:49
9.	"Distress"	Lightfield	7:16
10.	"Angel"	Matt Darey feat. Lost Tribe	3:51
11.	"Morning Jacket"	Craig McConnell	2:25
12.	"Valley Of The Shadows"	Origin Unknown	4:28
13.	"A Little Bit Of Love"	The Mahones	4:21
14.	"Wash It Away"	Craig McConnell	0:54

=== Bonus Movie Soundtrack (with additional score) ===
A second alternate album, with additional score from composer Craig McConnell, was released on August 20, 2012 exclusively on Juno Records' Juno Downloads website. This album is distributed by Ecstasy Film Inc.

No.	Title	Performer(s)	Length
1.	"Broadband"	Craig Robert McConnell	7:01
2.	"Connection"	Craig Robert McConnell	5:52
3.	"Customs"	Craig Robert McConnell	1:31
4.	"Inflection"	Craig Robert McConnell	7:00
5.	"Morning Jacket"	Craig Robert McConnell	2:26
6.	"Solo"	Craig Robert McConnell	1:49
7.	"Stolen Thunder"	Craig Robert McConnell	4:54
8.	"The Big Man"	Craig Robert McConnell	0:28
9.	"The Mule"	Craig Robert McConnell	1:04
10.	"Wash It Away"	Craig Robert McConnell	0:56
11.	"A Little Bit Of Love"	The Mahones	4:25
12.	"Distress"	Lightfield	7:17
13.	"Reunion"	Lightfield	13:07
14.	"Dance of Thor"	Captain Marryat	6:48
15.	"Cloud Trips"	Craig Robert McConnell	4:22
16.	"Ecstasy In Satellite"	Automated Gardens	3:32
17.	"Electric Ancients"	Automated Gardens	3:15
18.	"WTF Airport"	Craig Robert McConnell	2:42

=== Best of the Music from the Film ===
A third soundtrack was released on iTunes for Canada on November 12, 2012 and was captioned as "The Best of the Music from the Film". This album contains tracks from the two soundtracks with additional tracks as well. This album was also distributed by Ecstasy Film Inc.

Irvine Welsh's Ecstasy - The Best of the Music from the Film

Studio album by Various artists
- Released: November 21, 2012
- Genre: Soundtrack
- Length: 80:04
- Label: Ecstasy Film Inc
- Producer: Craig McConnell

No.	Title	Performer(s)	Length
1.	"Dance of Thor"	Captain Marryat	6:53
2.	"Beautiful World (Original Club Mix)"	Tiësto & Mark Knight feat. Dino	7:49
3.	"Inflection"	Craig McConnell	7:00
4.	"Distress"	Lightfield	7:17
5.	""House of the Rising Void""	Blue Visions	7:13
6.	"Cloud Trips"	Automated Gardens	4:22
7.	"Broadband"	Craig McConnell	7:01
8.	"Chattertooth"	Automated Gardens	6:36
9.	"Solo"	Craig McConnell	1:49
10.	"Ecstasy in Satellite"	Automated Gardens	3:32
11.	"Small Hours"	Bonjay	1:35
12.	"Electric Ancients"	Automated Gardens	3:15
13.	"Stolen Thunder"	Craig McConnell	4:54
14.	"WTF Airport"	Automated Gardens	2:42
15.	"Swimming Pool Love"	Automated Gardens	3:41
16.	"A Little Bit of Love"	The Mahones	4:25
