= A Diamond Hidden in the Mouth of a Corpse =

- Cover art designed by Keith Haring

Compilation album by Various
- Released: 1985
- Genre: No wave, experimental
- Label: Giorno Poetry Systems

A Diamond Hidden in the Mouth of a Corpse is a 1985 no wave compilation released on the Giorno Poetry Systems label.

== Track listing ==
No.	Title	Performing Artist(s)	Length
1.	"Won't Change"	Hüsker Dü
2.	"Johnsonius"	David Johansen
3.	"Scum & Slime"	John Giorno Band
4.	"Excerpts from the Western Lands: The President, Colonel Bradford, Everyman a God"	William S. Burroughs
5.	"Halloween"	Sonic Youth
6.	"Dead Man's Shoes"	Cabaret Voltaire
7.	"Excerpt from Eyes Without Blood"	Diamanda Galás
8.	"Neither His Nor Yours"	Coil
9.	"Game"	Michael Gira
10.	"Out of the Frying Pan"	David Van Tieghem
11.	"Tenement Lover"	Jessica Hagedorn & the Gangster Choir
