= Giorno Poetry Systems =

Founded by poet and performance artist John Giorno in 1965, Giorno Poetry Systems is a non-profit organization where artists, poets, and musicians present the work of other artists, poets, and musicians.

== History ==
In the early 1960s, young New York City-born poet John Giorno became acquainted with artists who were at the threshold of their successful careers, most notably Andy Warhol, Roy Lichtenstein, Merce Cunningham and John Cage. Warhol would have an important impact on Giorno, as the latter became the protagonist of Warhol's film Sleep (1964), which depicts Giorno sleeping for five hours, and the unreleased Handjob, following Giorno's face while masturbating.

Giorno believed that, at this level, poetry was running behind. Evidently, these artists in music and painting etc., would act whenever an idea arose in their minds, while the availability and progression of poetry was limited to books and magazines, let alone multimedia or performance.

Analogue to then active Pop-Art ideas, Giorno wanted to change poetry's situation by communicating to his audiences through everyday means such as telephone, television, records and so on. After all, phonographs and radio were a perfect terrain for people to listen, as Giorno called it poetry’s venue. Furthermore, these ways would offer Giorno's ideas a wide open space to explore, to reach a broad audience not limited anymore to that of the poetry magazines.

Beginning in 1965, Giorno would explore tape and phonograph recording, along with colleagues William S. Burroughs and Brion Gysin, using a variety of tape experiments such as loops and cut techniques Giorno was introduced to Bob Moog, who was working on his Moog synthesizer, on the verge of its fame.

== Concept ==
Giorno started GPS as a way to push poetry off the printed page and into visual, musical, social, and political realms. His goal was to highlight the work of other artists, poets, and musicians, and reach audiences through everyday “venues” such as the telephone, radio, and records, as well as rock clubs, shirts, and even consumer products.

For Dial-A-Poem, first launched in 1968, recordings by hundreds of poets, spoken word artists, and activists are delivered over the phone. GPS Records, begun in 1972, released over 40 albums featuring a wide range of musicians and poets such as Laurie Anderson and Philip Glass as well as unique performances by Frank Zappa, Diamanda Galás, Allen Ginsberg, John Cage, and Brion Gysin, as well as Giorno and Burroughs. The Nova Convention, in 1978, was a legendary three-day multi-media festival inspired by the writings of William Burroughs. The AIDS Treatment Project and The Artists & Poets Fund, running from 1985 to the early 2000s, produced benefit concerts and provided emergency grants for medical expenses to poets and artists, most of whom were people of color and members of the LGBTQ+ community. With political activist Abbie Hoffman, Giorno recorded a radio show for Radio Hanoi. And since 1986, GPS has hosted monthly retreats for those who study the Nyingmapa tradition of Tibetan Buddhism. GPS remains active today hosting a regular series of events. In 2026, the organization launched an annual need-based grant to assist artists with daily expenses.

=== Dial-a-Poem ===
After having a conversation on the phone with Burroughs in 1968, Giorno initiated the Dial-a-Poem Poets concept, which he claimed would later influence the creation of information services creation over the telephone, such as sports and stock market. Fifteen phone lines were connected with individual answering machines: people would call GPS and listen to a poem they were offered from fragments of various live recordings. Dial-a-Poem, from 1969 on, was very successful, with 9 a.m. to 5 p.m. and 8.30 p.m. to 11.30 p.m. peaks. GPS used a variety of social issues at the time, what with the sexual revolution and the Vietnam War, which would create appeal as well as shock from the reactive community.

== GPS Discography ==
=== Albums ===
- The Dial-a-Poem Poets, GPS 001-002, 1972
- The Dial-a-Poem Poets: Disconnected, GPS 003-004, 1974
- Biting Off the Tongue of a Corpse, GPS 005, 1975
- William S. Burroughs / John Giorno, GPS 006-007, 1975
- The Dial-a-Poem Poets: Totally Corrupt, GPS 008-009, 1976
- John Giorno & Anne Waldman: a KulchurSelection, GPS 010-011, 1977
- Big Ego, GPS 012-013, 1978
- The Nova Convention, GPS, GPS 014-015, 1979, with a once-only Frank Zappa performance reading an excerpt from Naked Lunch
- The Dial-a-Poem Poets: Sugar, Alcohol & Meat, GPS, GPS GPS 016-017, 1980
- John Giorno, William S. Burroughs, Laurie Anderson: You're the Guy I Want to Share My Money With (with multigrooved track) GPS020-021, 022-023, 042, 1981
- Polyphonix 1, GPS 024, 1981
- One World Poetry GPS 028-029, 1981
- John Giorno & Glenn Branca: Who You Staring At?, GPS 025, 1982
- The Dial-a-Poem Poets: Life Is a Killer, GPS 027, 1982
- Lenny Kaye Connection: I've Got a Right, GPS 032, 1984
- The Dial-a-Poem Poets: Better an Old Demon Than a New God, GPS 033, 1984
- Smack My Crack, GPS 038, 1987
- Like a Girl, I Want You to Keep Coming, GPS 040, 1989
- John Giorno in Florence, 1979/2000 edited by Maurizio Nannucci, Recorthings 2012

=== Compilations ===
- You're a Hook: The 15-Year Anniversary of Dial-a-Poem (1968-1983), GPS 030, 1984
- A Diamond Hidden in the Mouth of a Corpse, GPS 035, 1985
- Smack My Crack, GPS 038, 1987
- Like a Girl I Want You to Keep Coming, GPS 040, 1989
- Cash Cow: The Best of Giorno Poetry Systems, GPS 044, 1993
- Selections from The Best of William Burroughs, 1998
- The Best of William S. Burroughs from Giorno Poetry Systems, 1998

=== Video Materials ===
- Giorno Video Pak 1, GVP 1/GPS 031, with Lenny Kaye, William S. Burroughs and John Giorno.
- Burroughs, GVP 2/GPS 034, directed by Howard Brookner
- Poetry in Motion, GPS 036, a film by Ron Mann
- It's Clean, It Just Looks Dirty, GVP 3/GPS 037
- Gang of Souls, GVP 4/GPS 039
- Old Habits Die Hard, GVP 5/GPS 041

== See also ==
- List of record labels
