= Carmine Street Guitars =

- Directed by: Ron Mann
- Written by: Len Blum
- Produced by: Ron Mann
- Cinematography: Becky Parsons; John Minh Tran
- Edited by: Robert Kennedy
- Music by: Dallas Good; Travis Good
- Production company: Sphinx Productions
- Distributed by: Films We Like
- Release date: September 2, 2018 (Venice)
- Running time: 80 minutes
- Country: Canada

Carmine Street Guitars is a Canadian documentary film, directed by Ron Mann and released in 2018. The film centres on Carmine Street Guitars, a long-running guitar store in New York City.

The film premiered on September 2, 2018, at the 75th Venice International Film Festival, and had its Canadian premiere at the 2018 Toronto International Film Festival on September 9. It went into general theatrical release in April 2019.
