= Altman (film) =

- Teaser poster
- Directed by: Ron Mann
- Written by: Len Blum
- Produced by: Ron Mann; Bill Imperial
- Cinematography: Simon Ennis
- Edited by: Robert Kennedy
- Music by: Phil Dwyer; Guido Luciani
- Production company: Sphinx Productions
- Distributed by: Epix
- Release date: August 1, 2014 (TIFF Bell Lightbox)
- Running time: 96 minutes
- Country: Canada
- Language: English

Altman is a 2014 documentary film about the life and career of film director Robert Altman. The film was directed and produced by Ron Mann. It features brief contributions by several actors who had appeared in Altman's films, such as Robin Williams, Bruce Willis, Julianne Moore, Michael Murphy and Elliott Gould, as well as director Paul Thomas Anderson, who served as a "backup" director on A Prairie Home Companion.

== Synopsis ==
The film focuses in part on the problems Altman faced over the course of his filmmaking career, including writing screenplays (he sold a script to RKO for the 1948 picture Bodyguard) after World War II, and working as a director and writer of industrial films for the Calvin Company, and for television. Altman rose to prominence in the 1970s with films such as M*A*S*H and The Long Goodbye, before commercial flops forced a flight to Europe in the 1980s with projects such as Popeye.

Then, Altman enjoyed a career revival in the 1990s with The Player. The film also features commentary from Altman's wife and children, discussing their relationships and memories of him, and is peppered with short segments with Altman collaborators, each giving a synonym for the term "Altmanesque", in reference to Altman's methods.

== Reception ==
The film received moderately positive reviews. On the review aggregator website Rotten Tomatoes, 70% of 27 critics' reviews are positive.

Peter Bradshaw of The Guardian praised the film, only saying that, "Ron Mann's terrifically warm and generous documentary tribute to Robert Altman is, for me, spoiled only fractionally by its gimmick of putting the director's famous collaborators on the spot, on-camera, and demanding a synonym for 'Altmanesque'."

Mark Kermode of The Observer was, likewise, critical of Mann's choices, stating, "Home-movie footage and well-sourced TV/movie clips provide a tantalising patchwork upon which the narrative fails to build, with investigation of Altman's methods limited to platitudes about a script being little more than a blueprint, and fleeting descriptions of his sound-recording techniques."

=== Accolades ===
The film received a Canadian Screen Award nomination for Best Editing in a Documentary at the 3rd Canadian Screen Awards.
