= In the Wake of the Flood =

2010 Canadian documentary film by Ron Mann

- Directed by: Ron Mann
- Written by: Solomon Vesta
- Produced by: Bill Imperial; Judith Keenan
- Starring: Margaret Atwood
- Cinematography: Michael Marius Pessah; John M. Tran
- Edited by: Robert Kennedy
- Release date: 2 August 2010 (Possible Worlds Film Festival)
- Country: Canada
- Language: English

In the Wake of the Flood is a 2010 documentary film produced in Canada by director Ron Mann and featuring author Margaret Atwood. The film follows Atwood on her unusual book tour for her novel The Year of the Flood.

The film premiered in Canada in October 2010, and had its U.S. West Coast premiere at the San Francisco Green Film Festival in March 2011.
