= Feds (film) =

1988 film by Daniel Goldberg

- Theatrical release poster
- Directed by: Dan Goldberg
- Written by: Len Blum; Dan Goldberg
- Produced by: Len Blum; Ilona Herzberg
- Starring: Rebecca De Mornay; Mary Gross; Ken Marshall; Fred Dalton Thompson
- Cinematography: Timothy Suhrstedt
- Edited by: Donn Cambern
- Music by: Randy Edelman
- Production company: Ivan Reitman Productions
- Distributed by: Warner Bros. Pictures
- Release date: October 28, 1988
- Running time: 82 minutes
- Country: United States
- Language: English
- Box office: $3.8 million

Feds is a 1988 American crime comedy film co-written and directed by Dan Goldberg, and starring Rebecca De Mornay and Mary Gross. The plot follows two women, the ex-Marine Ellie and Bryn Mawr graduate Janis, who aim to become FBI agents and enroll at the training center in Quantico. The ending credits state that the real FBI did not support the film or assist the production in any way.

== Plot ==
Ellie DeWitt is a U.S. Marine veteran who wants to become an FBI agent. However, while she has great physical skills, she struggles at the academic level. Conversely, her roommate Janis Zuckerman is highly intelligent, but physically very weak. Overcoming the male recruits' assumptions of them, Ellie and Janis team up to help each other through the basic training and become federal agents.

During training, Ellie and Janis cope with an instructor who seems determined to fail the pair, a fellow trainee who hit on Ellie (until Ellie asserts her Marine training and pins him against the wall during an exercise), and befriend nerdy co-trainee Howard who seems unable to complete the smallest task.

Joining forces, the three tackle the final practice simulation, (badly) forging the instructor's signature ('he sneezed') and breaking into the telephone room to discover the "hostage's" location. They also use their radio to mislead the other agents into a swamp to prevent them finding the hostage first.

The two graduate with honors and in the credits scene, both Ellie and Janis are assigned as partners to the Los Angeles office.

== Cast ==
- Rebecca De Mornay as Elizabeth 'Ellie' De Witt
- Mary Gross as Janis Zuckerman
- Ken Marshall as Brent Shepard
- Fred Dalton Thompson as FBI Agent Bill Bilecki
- Larry Cedar as Howard Butz
- Raymond Singer as George Hupperman
- James Luisi as FBI Agent Sperry
- Jon Cedar as FBI Senior Agent
- Rex Ryon as Parker
- Norman Bernard as Bickerstaff
- Bradley Weissman as Graham
- Don Stark as Willy
- David Sherrill as Duane
- Michael Chieffo as Louie
- Geoffrey Thorne as College Jock #3
- Lee Arnone as Female Marine
- Rick Avery as Bank Robber #3
- Tony Longo as Sailor

== Production ==
Dan Goldberg and Len Blum, the screenwriters behind Meatballs and Stripes, originally planned to make a film about "the daffy, goofy sex-crazed guys at the FBI academy." When they couldn't get stars of previous Ivan Reitman films like Bill Murray or Dan Aykroyd to sign on, the pair switched the story mid-script to a female-focused film.

Feds was made during a cycle of American police comedies that came out after the box-office success of Police Academy (1984). These films included Police Academy's sequels, Night Patrol (1984), Moving Violations (1985), Off Beat (1986), and Hollywood Vice Squad (1986).

== Home media ==
Feds was first released on VHS by Warner Home Video on February 22, 1989. It was released on DVD by Warner Home Video on July 7, 2010.

== Critical reception ==
Feds received mixed reviews from critics. Michael Wilmington of the Los Angeles Times wrote, "The stars—De Mornay as the brawn and Gross as the brains—are good enough to make this dopey idea work. But Blum and Goldberg don't give them much better than the usual parade of elephantine slapstick, grotesque topical humor, sexual innuendo and rock ‘n' roll sound bites." Rita Kempley of The Washington Post wrote negatively of the film and said De Mornay and Gross are "playing badly written, weirdly reactionary parts." Time Out said, "director Goldberg seems uncertain whether he should be aiming for slapstick or an earnest docu-drama about sexism in the FBI."

Andi Zeisler of Bitch magazine pointed out Feds was apparently the first female buddy cop movie when critics falsely claimed the 2013 comedy film The Heat was the first in that sub-genre.
