= Rob Heydon =

Canadian filmmaker

Robert Heydon
- Born: Toronto, Ontario, Canada
- Occupation: filmmaker

Rob Heydon is a Canadian film producer and director of television series, feature films and documentaries.

Heydon was born in Toronto, Ontario, Canada. He first worked at the Norman Jewison Canadian Film Centre for Advanced Film Studies as a PM and producer.

Rob Heydon is a partner with VFX and animation company Lazarus Effects Inc.

Heydon produced and directed Isabelle, a horror film for Lakeshore Entertainment starring Adam Brody and Amanda Crew written by writer Donald Martin with producer Sid Ganis and Joni Sighvatsson and released in 2019.

In 2018, Heydon executive produced O.G. the feature film with Jeffrey Wright. The film premiered at the Tribeca Film Festival. HBO acquired the film.

In 2017, Heydon was the executive producer of The Crescent, directed by Seth Smith. The film premiered at Midnight Madness at the Toronto International Film Festival. Amazon acquired the film.

In 2014 Heydon was Executive Producer of the $26m television series, The Pinkertons, which ran for one season straight to syndication in the US.

In 2011, Heydon produced and directed Irvine Welsh's Ecstasy, based on the #1 bestselling novel by Irvine Welsh. Which was #1 film the week it was released on iTunes.

In 2003, Heydon co-produced Go Further, starring Woody Harrelson (Audience Award runner up prize at Toronto International Film Festival).

He won a 2000 Juno Award for Best Music Video for Edwin's "Alive", which also won People's Choice Award at Much Music Video Awards.

== Selected filmography ==
=== Television series ===
- 2026 Last Rituals, Producer.
- 2015 The Pinkertons, Producer.

=== Feature films ===
- 2019 Isabelle, Director, Producer.
- 2018 O.G., Executive Producer.
- 2017 The Crescent, Executive Producer.
- 2014 Journey Home, Producer.
- 2011 Irvine Welsh's Ecstasy, Director, Producer, Writer. Based on the #1 Bestselling book by Irvine Welsh
- 2005 The Adventure of Greyfriar's Bobby, Co-Producer.

=== Documentaries ===
- 2003 Go Further, Director, Producer: Ron Mann as Cinematographer
- 1997 Rippin, Director, Producer
- 1996 NYE - Pleasure Force, Director, Producer
- 1995 Jokers High - Pleasure Force, Director, Producer

=== Video ===
- 2004 Ninja Tune Recordings Zen TV

=== Music videos ===
- 2000 Beautiful Strange, Bedrock
- 2000 I Understand, McMaster and James, BMG Records
- 2000 Never Too Late, Damhnait Doyle, EMI
- 1999 Alive, Edwin, Sony Music
- 1999 Skizofrenik, Plastikman, Plus 8 Records / Sony Music Publishing
- 1999 Packard, Plastikman, Plus 8 Records / Sony Music Publishing
- 1999 It's Obvious, DJ Vadim, Ninja Tune Records
- 1999 Road with Many Signs, The Herbaliser with Dream Warriors, Ninja Tune Records
- 1998 Converge, Plastikman, Plus 8 Records / Sony Music Publishing

== Awards ==
- 2000 Juno Awards, Canada - Best Music Video, for "Alive" (Edwin)
- 2000 MuchMusic Video Awards of 2000, Canada - People's Choice Best Music Video, for "Alive" (Edwin)
- 2000 Much Music Video Awards, Best Cinematography, 2000, McMaster and James's "I Understand" music video
- 2000 East Coast Music Awards, Nomination for Best Video: Never Too Late (Damhnait Doyle)
- 1999 Music Video Production Association MVPA Awards, U.S. - Nomination for Best Electronic Video: Converge (Plastikman)
- 1995 The Canadian International Film and Video Festival., Best Comedy Film and Best Film, "Men will be Boys"
- 1993 McGill Film Festival, Montreal, Nominated Best Film, "The Silent Pickup Line"
