= Grass (1999 film) =

- Promotional artwork for Grass
- Directed by: Ron Mann
- Written by: Solomon Vesta
- Produced by: Keith Clarkson
- Narrated by: Woody Harrelson
- Cinematography: Robert Fresco
- Edited by: Robert Kennedy
- Production company: Sphinx Productions
- Distributed by: Unapix Home Entertainment
- Release date: 15 September 1999 (Toronto Film Festival)
- Running time: 80 minutes
- Country: Canada
- Language: English

Grass: History of Marijuana is a 1999 Canadian documentary film directed by Ron Mann, premiered at the Toronto International Film Festival, about the history of the United States government's war on marijuana in the 20th century. The film was narrated by actor Woody Harrelson.

== Overview ==
The film presents this map of US states with non-medical marijuana decriminalization laws. State-level but not federal decriminalization of non-medical marijuana No federal or state level decriminalization of non-medical marijuana

The film follows the history of US federal policies and social attitudes towards marijuana, beginning at the turn of the twentieth century. The history presented is broken up into parts, approximately the length of a decade, each of which is introduced by paraphrasing the official attitude towards marijuana at the time (e.g. "Marijuana will make you insane" or "Marijuana will make you addicted to heroin"), and closed by providing a figure for the amount of money spent during that period on the "war on marijuana."

The film places much of the blame for marijuana criminalization on Harry Anslinger (the first American drug czar) who promoted false information about marijuana to the American public as a means towards abolition. It later shows how the federal approach to criminalization became more firmly entrenched after Richard Nixon declared a "war on drugs" and created the Drug Enforcement Administration in 1973, and even more so a decade later and on, as First Lady Nancy Reagan introduced the "Just Say No" campaign and President George H. W. Bush accelerated the war on drugs. The film ends during the Bill Clinton administration, which had accelerated spending even further on the war on drugs.

Grass is almost completely composed of archival footage, much of which is from public domain U.S. propaganda films and such feature films as Reefer Madness, as it also served as a portrait of marijuana in popular media.

The art director and poster designer of the film was Paul Mavrides.

== Critical reception ==
The film was generally well received by critics, scoring 64 out of 100 in Metacritic, and a rating of 75% on Rotten Tomatoes.

The film won Canada's Genie Award for Best Documentary.

== See also ==
- Decriminalization of marijuana in the United States
- Legal and medical status of cannabis
- Legal history of marijuana in the United States
- Marijuana rescheduling in the United States
