= Commandments (film) =

- Theatrical release poster
- Directed by: Daniel Taplitz
- Written by: Daniel Taplitz
- Produced by: Michael Chinich; Daniel Goldberg; Joe Medjuck
- Starring: Aidan Quinn; Courteney Cox; Anthony LaPaglia
- Cinematography: Slawomir Idziak
- Edited by: Michael Jablow
- Music by: Joseph Vitarelli
- Production companies: Northern Lights Entertainment; Gramercy Pictures
- Distributed by: Universal Pictures
- Release date: May 2, 1997
- Running time: 88 minutes
- Country: United States
- Language: English
- Budget: $5 million
- Box office: $548,562

Commandments is a 1997 American romantic comedy drama film written and directed by Daniel Taplitz, and starring Aidan Quinn, Courteney Cox and Anthony LaPaglia.

== Plot ==
Ever since Seth Warner's wife died two years ago, his life has gone to pieces. In his rage, he affronts God who seemingly responds by stopping his suicide attempt and his screaming at God above by crippling his dog and putting Seth in the hospital. So Seth sets out to break all the Ten Commandments. Moving in with his sister-in-law, Rachel and her reporter-husband, Harry, he systematically starts breaking each of the commandments, increasingly aided by Harry and Rachel. When Rachel finds out Harry has been having an affair, she responds by having an affair with Seth. Seth then steals all of Harry's personally autographed guitars and pawns them, subsequently lying to the police that it was part of an insurance scam and Harry was in on it. Harry loses his job and finds out Rachel is pregnant with Seth's baby. Seth attempts to kill himself but is swallowed by a whale and the belly is cut open and Seth is released. Rachel decides to marry Seth and raise the baby with him. Harry stands on top of a building with Seth's crippled dog the same way Seth did before and asks for a sign from God. Perhaps to be saved like Seth was.

== Critical reception ==
On the review aggregator website Rotten Tomatoes, 24% of 17 critics' reviews are positive.

Roger Ebert gave the film two stars.
