= Go Further =

- DVD Cover
- Directed by: Ron Mann
- Written by: Solomon Vesta
- Starring: Woody Harrelson
- Edited by: Robert Kennedy
- Distributed by: Mongrel Media
- Release date: 2003
- Running time: 80 minutes
- Countries: Canada; United States
- Language: English

Go Further is a 2003 documentary film by Ron Mann starring Woody Harrelson and a group of other environmental activists riding around in a large, bio-fueled bus. The tour was called the Simple Organic Living Tour and it was produced by cause-related marketers the Spitfire Agency. The film debuted at the South by Southwest Film Festival in March 2003, and at the Toronto International Film Festival in September 2003, where it was first runner-up for the People's Choice Award. It was also nominated for a Genie Award for Best Documentary. The film features cameos by Dave Matthews, Natalie Merchant, Ken Kesey, Bob Weir (of the Grateful Dead), Michael Franti (of Spearhead), Anthony Kiedis (of Red Hot Chili Peppers), Rob Heydon, Medeski Martin & Wood, and The String Cheese Incident.

== Description ==
Ron Mann's Go Further is a documentary observing the escapades of Woody Harrelson and his comrades as they travel from Seattle, Washington, to Los Angeles, California. In an attempt to spread a message of change in order to better the planet, Woody and his companions—"a yoga-teacher, a raw food chef, a hemp-activist, a junk-food addict, and a college student who suspends her life to impulsively hop aboard"—speak at numerous universities and visit various environmentally important sites, as their journey weaves on and around Route 101. It is an example of individual and political action on climate change.

== Book ==
The film also triggered the writing of a book, titled Go Further, published by Warwick Publishing in Toronto, Ontario. The book's ideologies and themes parallel the movie.
