= Ecstasy: Three Tales of Chemical Romance =

1993 book by Irvine Welsh

Ecstasy
- First edition cover
- Author: Irvine Welsh
- Language: English
- Publisher: Jonathan Cape (UK); W. W. Norton (US)
- Publication date: May 1996 (UK); August 1996 (US)
- Publication place: Scotland
- Media type: Print (hardback and paperback)
- Pages: 276 pp
- ISBN: 0-224-04270-X
- OCLC: 35331741

Ecstasy: Three Tales of Chemical Romance is a 1996 collection of three novellas by Irvine Welsh.

== Novellas ==
=== Lorraine Goes to Livingston ===
After suffering a stroke, Rebecca Navarro, a best-selling romance novelist, discovers the truth about her corrupt, pornography-loving husband. With the help of Lorraine, her sexually confused nurse, she plots her revenge.

Another nurse at the hospital, Glen, has been secretly admiring Lorraine but after a night at a club, decides to pursue her friend Yvonne instead. Meanwhile, Glen has been accepting money from Freddy Royle, a necrophiliac TV personality. The hospital trustees turn a blind eye to Freddy's nefarious pastime but have to do some fast talking when the new coroner begins asking questions.

=== Fortune's Always Hiding ===
Samantha Worthington, an angry and bitter 'Tenazadrine' (Thalidomide) victim, enlists a football hooligan, Dave, to help her seek revenge on the last man left alive who pushed the drug who caused her deformed arms, the drug's marketing director.

The story is told in flashbacks from Samantha's past, flashbacks of the drug marketer's past and his present well-being, and a first person perspective from Dave's eyes. It is known as a "psychedelic" novel.

=== The Undefeated ===
The longest novella, The Undefeated, presents slice-of-life episodes from the lives of two recreational drug users. Lloyd, an ageing clubber, begins to question his life and considers the possibility of falling in love. Housewife Heather leaves her Dire Straits-loving suburban husband and starts a new life amongst the rave scene, where she meets Lloyd. The film based on The Undefeated was produced and directed by Rob Heydon in 2011.

'Welsh smoothly demonstrates his belief in the liberating power of dance culture. Most interestingly, he avoids the easy route of claiming utopia. If drugs can liberate you, then they can as easily ruin you.'

== Stage adaptation ==
Soon after publication the book was adapted for the stage by Canadian playwright Keith Wyatt. Debuting at the Edmonton Fringe Festival (1998), the play was considered to be a tremendous hit, leading to its subsequent tour across Canada (1999), and on to the Edinburgh Fringe Festival. In Edinburgh, the production was attended by the story's original author, Irvine Welsh, whose appreciation for the play led to its international publication in an omnibus of Irvine Welsh stage adaptations, entitled 4 Play, through Vintage/Random House UK.

In the Introduction of 4 Play Welsh had this to say about the play Ecstasy:

"I feel that Ecstasy, by Raven Productions, has been the best theatrical adaptation of my work to date, and I've seen different productions all over the world. I feel that it has fully realized the potential of the story "The Undefeated", giving the text a power which I felt it lacked on the page. It fully captures the spirit I intended, and in its control of pace and use of environment, it creates a unique theatrical experience. It made writing the thing worthwhile; artistically, the play delivered the book for me. I was surprised just how excellent this production was, and I could not believe the empathy and skill with which Keith Wyatt handled the dramatization of this piece."

== Cultural references ==
Following the 2012 Jimmy Savile sexual abuse scandal, commentators have remarked on the seemingly uncanny resemblance between the character of Freddy Royle and Savile and Welsh has stated he was aware of the Savile rumours at the time. He has stated: "I had nothing to do with the hospital services, or NHS trusts, or the BBC, so how come I knew this rumour about Jimmy Savile, this eccentric British institution? There must have been so much stuff on the grapevine. But there was a whole culture then of not addressing these issues."

The American rock band My Chemical Romance was named after the book, after the bassist, Mikey Way, was shown the book while working in a Barnes & Noble before the band was formed. The phrase "Chemical Romance" caught his eye and he was shocked nobody had used it as a band name before, prompting him to use it for his own band's name. Frank Iero said that the name was popular and many people in the New Jersey punk rock scene were jealous they hadn't thought of something like it.

== Film ==
A film version of Ecstasy was announced at the 2008 Toronto International Film Festival and was released in 2011. It was produced and directed by Rob Heydon.
