= Heather Munroe-Blum =

Canadian business woman and academic

Heather Munroe-Blum OC OQ FRSC
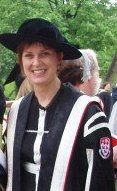
- Munroe-Blum at 2007 Spring Convocation at McGill University
- Born: Heather Anne Elyse Lilian Munroe; August 25, 1950 (age 76); Montreal, Quebec, Canada
- Education: McMaster University; Wilfrid Laurier University; University of North Carolina at Chapel Hill
- Occupations: Financier, college president
- Spouse: Len Blum (m. 1970)
- Children: 1

Heather Anne Elyse Lilian Munroe-Blum OC OQ FRSC (born August 25, 1950) is a Canadian academic and businesswoman.

== Biography ==
She is the former principal and vice-chancellor of McGill University in Montreal, Quebec. She is also a member of the board of directors of the Royal Bank of Canada, and chairperson of the board of directors of the Canada Pension Plan Investment Board.

== Personal life ==
She has been married to Len Blum since 1970, with whom she has a daughter, Sydney.

== Awards and recognition ==
She is a member of the Trilateral Commission.

== Sources ==
- Biography from the McGill University Administration and Governance site
- Biography from the CPPIB site
- Canadian Who's Who 1997 entry
- The Globe and Mail
- Board of Directors and Committee Memberships of RBC
