= Craig McConnell =

Canadian music composer (active 2002– )

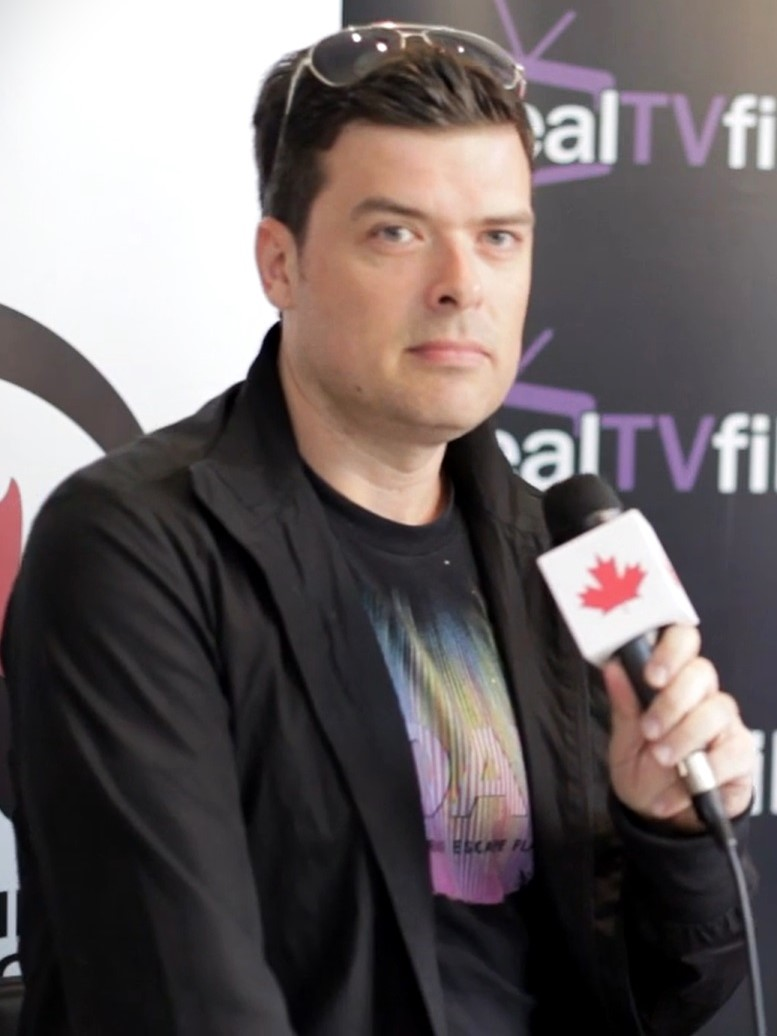
- McConnell in 2012

Background information
- Born: Craig Robert McConnell; Toronto, Ontario, Canada
- Genre: Film score
- Occupations: Music producer, composer, songwriter
- Years active: 2002–present
- Website: www.craigrobertmcconnell.com

Craig Robert McConnell is a Canadian music executive, producer and songwriter based in Toronto. He is also a film and television composer.

== Career ==
McConnell produced and co-wrote "The Chase" for Celine Dion's album Courage, released in 2019. He also collaborated with Kayla Diamond on her 2018 debut EP Beautiful Chaos. He produced and co-wrote "Carnival Hearts" (Top 20 Billboard CHR) and "What You're Made Of" (Top 10 Billboard Hot AC) for Kayla Diamond (Cadence/Universal). He has done extensive songwriting and production work for RuPaul's Drag Race Canada winner Priyanka (Canada's Drag Race), including her breakout single "Come Through", which has amassed over 10 million streams. Other artist collaborators have included Keshia Chanté (Tanjola/Universal), Crystal Kay (Epic/Sony Japan), Jane Zhang (Sony Music China), CHEMISTRY (DefStar/Sony) and Juno-winner Divine Brown.

His work in the video game industry includes writing and producing the theme song for CAPCOM's 2023 release of Resident Evil 4.

His film scoring credits include Irvine Welsh's Ecstasy (from the author of Trainspotting), Textuality (starring Jason Lewis), as well as several dozen TV movies for Hallmark, Lifetime and Oprah Winfrey Network (OWN). His episodic television work includes score and songs for Nickelodeon's Bossy Bear, WordGirl (PBS), Wedding SOS (Slice) and Property Virgins (HGTV). Along with partner Justin Forsley, he wrote the theme song and underscores for the Nickelodeon sitcoms Life With Boys, Max & Shred and Star Falls.

In 2012, he was nominated for "Best Music" at the 2012 British Independent Film Festival (BIFF) Awards for his work on Irvine Welsh's Ecstasy.

In 2014, McConnell co-founded the Production Music company Hard Music Group, which, through its partnerships with APM (Sony/Universal) and BMG among other global sub-publishers, supplies music to television networks, Film/TV production companies, advertisers and social media companies around the world. To date, the company has produced in excess of 250 albums. McConnell continues to serve as President.

McConnell holds a B.A.Sc in Engineering Science as part the first graduating class of Biomedical Engineers at the University of Toronto. He has also served two terms on the board of directors of the Screen Composers Guild of Canada.
