= Spacehunter: Adventures in the Forbidden Zone =

1983 film by Lamont Johnson

- Original film poster
- Directed by: Lamont Johnson
- Written by: David Preston; Edith Rey; Daniel Goldberg; Len Blum
- Story by: Stewart Harding; Jean LaFluer
- Produced by: Don Carmody; Andre Link; John Dunning
- Starring: Peter Strauss; Molly Ringwald; Ernie Hudson; Michael Ironside
- Cinematography: Frank Tidy
- Edited by: Scott Conrad
- Music by: Elmer Bernstein
- Production companies: Columbia Pictures; Ivan Reitman Productions
- Distributed by: Columbia Pictures
- Release date: May 20, 1983
- Running time: 90 minutes
- Countries: United States; Canada
- Language: English
- Budget: $14.4 million or $12 million
- Box office: $16.5 million (US)

Spacehunter: Adventures in the Forbidden Zone is a 1983 American-Canadian science fiction action film. The film stars Peter Strauss, Molly Ringwald, Ernie Hudson, Andrea Marcovicci and Michael Ironside. The film's executive producer was Ivan Reitman, and it was directed by Lamont Johnson. The film's music score was composed by Elmer Bernstein. When the film was originally released in theaters it was shown in a polarized, over/under 3-D format. The film became part of the 3-D film revival craze of the early 1980s, being widely released after Comin' at Ya! (1981). The film is about a bounty hunter who goes on a mission to rescue three women stranded on a brutal planet and meets a vagrant teenage girl along the way.

== Plot ==
In the early 22nd century, a bolt of nebular lightning destroys a space cruise liner. Three survivors—Nova, Reena, and Meagan—board an escape pod and land on the nearest habitable planet. They are quickly accosted by hostile natives and taken aboard a sail-driven vehicle resembling a pirate ship on rails.

In space, an alert is broadcast for the safe return of the women with a reward of 3,000 mega-credits. Wolff, a mercenary turned small-time salvage operator, intercepts the message and tells Chalmers, his engineer, to check the ship's computer for information about the world they are marooned on. The planet, Terra 11, is a pre-war Earth colony that failed due to a deadly plague and civil war and is still quarantined. Wolff decides to risk the dangers as the reward will pay for his debts and ship repairs.

After landing on the barren world, Wolff and Chalmers set out in a heavily armed and armored four-wheel-drive vehicle called the Scrambler. They become involved in a battle in progress between a group of marauders called Zoners and a band of rail-ship nomads led by the aged Grandman Patterson. The Zoners take the women before Wolff can stop them and fly away on jet-powered hang gliders.

Wolff learns from the nomads that the women were taken to the Zone, ruled by "Overdog" McNabb. Patterson and McNabb were once doctors sent to cure the plague, but McNabb abandoned his mission. Returning to the Scrambler, Wolff finds that Chalmers—revealed to be an android—has been killed during the battle. He continues alone but soon catches a teenage ragamuffin, Niki the Twister, trying to steal his Scrambler. She says that she knows how to get to the Zone, and Wolff reluctantly takes her on as a guide.

In the meantime, the three women are taken to the Chemist, Overdog's chief henchman, who gives them pacifying drugs and prepares them for Overdog's pleasure. Overdog is revealed to be a hideous cyborg with giant mechanical claws.

Wolff and Niki make camp but soon come under attack by a strange plow-like vehicle. Wolff disables it and learns that the driver is Washington, a military acquaintance who served with him in Sector Control and is now chief of Terra Sector. He also came to Terra 11 to rescue the women, but his ship crashed and he has no way off of the planet. Still determined to claim the reward, Wolff leaves him to fend for himself.

On the way to the Zone, Wolff and Niki are attacked by ragged plague-scarred cannibals called Scavs, various mutated humanoids, and a subterranean tribe of aquatic Barracuda Women who try to feed the pair to a water dragon. They abandon the Scrambler and continue on foot. Washington finds them dehydrated and begging for help; he agrees to join up and split the reward 50/50 with Wolff.

The group sneak into Overdog's fortress, where he entertains the Zoners by forcing prisoners to run a deadly obstacle course. Wolff spots the women in a cage and forms a rescue plan, but a bored Niki (who was left out of the plan for her own safety) decides to snoop around. She is captured and sent into the maze. Over Washington's objections, Wolff heads back to rescue her, although Niki is able to reach the end on her own. Overdog drags her to his lair and begins draining her life energy to sustain himself.

Wolff comes to the rescue and jabs a sparking power cable into one of Overdog's claws, electrocuting him and causing blowouts throughout the fortress. Washington arrives in the plow machine, accompanied by Nova, Reena and Meagan in the salvaged Scrambler. They race out of the fortress just before it explodes.

Back at his spaceship Wolff invites Niki to come with him, Washington and the rescued women back to Earth. The girl says she will only if they remain partners, and Wolff agrees.

== Main cast ==
- Peter Strauss as Wolff
- Molly Ringwald as Niki
- Ernie Hudson as Washington
- Andrea Marcovicci as Chalmers
- Michael Ironside as Overdog McNabb
- Beeson Carroll as Grandman Patterson
- Hrant Alianak as The Chemist
- Deborah Pratt as Meagan
- Aleisa Shirley as Reena
- Cali Timmins as Nova
- Reggie Bennett as Barracuda Leader
- Harold Ramis as Voice On Intercom (Uncredited)
- Colin Mochrie as Guard (Uncredited)

== Production ==
=== Development ===
Stewart Harding and Jean LaFluer wrote the original story under the title Road Gangs, which they described as a mixture of The Warriors and Mad Max, and was pitched to Canadian producers John Dunning and Andre Link, who agreed to finance development. David Preston and Edith Rey developed a script from Harding and LaFluer's story, adding the character of Niki and her acrimonious relationship with Wolff. The first draft was delivered by Spring of 1982 and sent to Ivan Reitman, who came on board as an executive producer. As The Road Warrior was in production, Reitman decided the action should be relocated from a post-apocalyptic earth to another planet, and the film was retitled to Adventures in the Creep Zone with a planned $2 million budget, LaFluer hired as director, and distribution secured with Columbia Pictures.

The film, which was announced in February 1982, was one of a number of 3D films made in the wake of the success of the Spanish-American 3D Western film Comin' at Ya!. Ernie McNab, the 3D designer on this film, said the effects would enable the audience to "really feel space." Producer Don Carmody said, "We never stoop to pop popcorn in your face. We do have one scene where laser beams and flame-blasters are bombarding the audience fast and furious, but these effects occur during a battle scene and appear valid." In 2015 Reitman said: "We had to have two cameras. We just shot it in what is now called "native" 3-D, and it was hell. And there were no screens that you could show it in. That was not really a practical idea in 1981."

=== Casting ===
Ernie Hudson says when he was first cast he was told Jeff Bridges would play Wolff. Then Peter Strauss was cast in the role.

=== Filming ===
Filming started under the title Adventures in the Creep Zone in October 1982 at a budget of $4 million. The original director was Jean LaFleur, who had co-written the original story and previously worked with producer Don Carmody. However, after only two weeks of filming, LaFelur and several other crew members were fired, reportedly because Columbia was unhappy with the film's progress, and the footage LaFleur shot was scrapped. His replacement was Lamont Johnson, who inisted that makeup, costuming, and production design be completely reworked. According to make-up artist Tom Burman, LaFleur didn't have a concrete idea of what he wanted from a production standpoint, and the production, costuming, and makeup departments were given free rein; he compared Molly Ringwald's early makeup to the look of a Mandrill, scav costumes were so thick with mud some actors could barely move and one couldn't get through doors, and the electric vehicles were so over-designed with spikes and studs that it was described as The Road Warrior to the nth degree. The script presented additional issues; Niki was portrayed as unsympathetic and overly foul-mouthed, with the relationship between her and Wolff never experiencing a thaw in the tension. After Reitman made the unilateral decision to scrap LaFleur's footage as "test footage", he brought in Daniel Goldberg and Len Blum who'd worked with Reitman on Stripes and contacted Lamont Johnson, who was directing an adaptation of Jack and the Beanstalk for Faerie Tale Theatre, as it was felt his experience as a budget-minded television director would be an ideal choice to get the production back on track. Johnson hated the script; he thought that the relationship between Wolff and Niki had the foundation for a good idea but felt everything from the look of the film to the script needed to be adjusted. He credited Goldberg and Blum with adding some heart to the film. Spacehunter had been planned as a "flat film", but the success of Friday the 13th Part III spurred the decision to do the film in 3-D.

Strauss said this led to changes in his character. "There were attempts to make him a little less tough and a little more gentle and responsive to the girl, Niki. Some of his grittiness in the earlier version was replaced with a notion of more gentleness." "It was difficult because things were always changing," said Hudson. "We changed the script entirely. When Lamont came in, we got a new script, a new everything. I ended up really liking Lamont. But it was very confusing, especially in the beginning."

Molly Ringwald said "I was always attracted to the character. The script was pretty — uh — but I figured that maybe I could change the dialogue a little when I got there. As it turned out, they were desperate to change the dialogue. I was quite relieved when Lamont showed up and said, 'This is awwwful. Let's change all this!' The script was re-written a lot. There was a train which started out as evil and wound up being good. People who were supposed to be friends ended up being enemies. It was confusing. I was lucky, though. All my material was improved."

Hudson felt the movie "was a real stretch for" Strauss "and the confusion didn't help [...] Wolff was a wonderful, Harrison Ford type, but that's not Peter. An actor has to take it his own way and do something totally different. Unfortunately, you're working with people who want the Harrison Ford thing, and they want it from you [...] Peter had to carry his first big feature through all that confusion, and it was very difficult."

Parts of the film were shot in Utah, including location shooting in Kane Creek, Bull Canyon, along the Colorado River, Potash, Lower Shafer Trail, Potash Settling Ponds, Grey Hills, U.S. Highway 91, and the area south of Canyonlands Regional Airport. Some shooting was also done in Vancouver.

== Soundtrack ==
The film's music was done by Elmer Bernstein who later called the film "too rushed. The studio's only concern was getting it to the box office to make quick money, riding an anticipated, lucrative 3-D boom. ... The producers didn't want to fool around. They were looking for a more conventional approach. So, I wrote it like a Western with lots of straightforward heroics and a conventional orchestra, except for the Ondes Martenot."

== Release ==
The film's advertising emphasized the 3D aspects. Columbia released Spacehunter on May 20, 1983, timed to be a week before Return of the Jedi.

It took $7 million in the first week. However ticket sales dropped sharply. The film ended up grossing $16.5 million at the United States box office.

Hudson says he felt people went to the movie "and expected to see something different. If you don't have something really special and different, people just ask why they should spend money to see this thing? I don't think Spacehunter was daring enough; it wasn't really risky. We never lived up to our own publicity. It wasn't a bad story as movies go. And with Peter in it, I think people expected Spacehunter to be a serious film, and it wasn't serious at all."

While the film went mostly ignored at the U.S. box office, it did find some success on home video, becoming the 10th best selling videocassette of 1983. As of 2024, the only 3D home video releases were the Japanese VHD release and the German Blu-ray from Koch Media, which is an anaglyph version derived from the VHD release.

== Reception ==
Variety called it "a muddled science fiction tale" whose editing prevented audiences from enjoying the well-shot action scenes. Janet Maslin of The New York Times wrote that the film did more with its 3D than its contemporaries but was too crowded with derivative ideas to be memorable. Rotten Tomatoes gives the film an approval rating of 27% and average rating of 3.3/10 based on 15 reviews.

C.J. Henderson reviewed Spacehunter in Space Gamer No. 65. Henderson commented "Watch for this one when it is finally released to cable, or to the video stores. This is one of those movies one gets more from in the living-room than in the theatre."

John Nubbin reviewed Spacehunter: Adventures in the Forbidden Zone for Different Worlds magazine and stated that "Every move in the script we have seen, every word out of the speakers we have heard, somewhere before. Comics, pulp stories, Saturday series, C-movies since they were first made - everything contributed something to the film, but no one tried to make it do anything new. Or different. Or involving. Or (ultimately) very interesting, either."

In a 2015 interview, Ivan Reitman referred to the movie as "...a terrible movie in 3-D."

== Home media ==
The movie was released on DVD in the US by Columbia/Tri-Star in December 2001. It was released on Blu-ray by Mill Creek Entertainment in the US and Canada in May 2017 (without any supplemental features), by Via Vision Entertainment in Australia in March 2019, and by 101 Films in the UK in March 2020 (featuring a commentary with film historians Allan Bryce and Richard Holliss).

== See also ==
- List of American films of 1983
- List of 3D films
