= Imagine the Sound =

- Directed by: Ron Mann
- Produced by: Ron Mann; Bill Smith
- Starring: Paul Bley; Bill Dixon; Archie Shepp; Cecil Taylor
- Cinematography: Robert Fresco
- Edited by: Sonya Polonsky
- Release date: 1981
- Running time: 90 minutes
- Country: Canada
- Language: English

Imagine the Sound is a 1981 Canadian documentary film about the music genre of free jazz, directed by Ron Mann. It serves as Mann's feature film directorial debut.

== Background ==
Imagine the Sound marks Mann's feature film directorial debut; he made the film while he was still in his early twenties. The film deals with the once-controversial genre of free jazz.

Shot entirely in Toronto, the film features interviews with and musical and dramatic performances by pianist Cecil Taylor, saxophonist Archie Shepp, trumpeter Bill Dixon, and pianist Paul Bley. Bill Smith features as the interviewer of the film's subjects.

== Availability ==
The film has been digitally restored and was released on DVD in 2007.

== Reception ==
Critic and film historian Jonathan Rosenbaum has said that Imagine the Sound “may be the best documentary on free jazz that we have.”

== See also ==
- Toronto New Wave-the film movement Ron Mann was part of in 1980s Canada
- Ornette: Made in America- the 1985 Shirley Clarke documentary film about free jazz pioneer Ornette Coleman
- Poetry in Motion-a 1982 documentary film also by Mann
