= Poetry in Motion (film) =

1982 Canadian documentary film

- Film poster
- Directed by: Ron Mann
- Cinematography: Robert Fresco
- Edited by: Peter Wintonick
- Release date: 1982
- Running time: 91 minutes
- Country: Canada
- Language: English

Poetry in Motion is a 1982 Canadian documentary film directed by Ron Mann featuring contemporary North American poetry and music. Featured are some of the Black Mountain poets, Beats, minimalist poets, and avant-garde poets. It was released in theaters, later being distributed on VHS, LaserDisc, and DVD. An extended CD-ROM version was also released.

== Production ==
Poetry in Motion is Mann's second feature film after Imagine the Sound. While watching John Giorno and William S. Burroughs at a rock club, Mann discovered Giorno's Dial-A-Poem recordings during a break in the performance. The director later decided to create an anthology of "post-Beat" poets for a film. His idea was based on the poem anthology publication The New American Poetry 1945–1960 by Donald Allen. The first poet to say that they were interested in being in the film was Allen Ginsberg. Almost 40 poets performed more than 75 poems, and filmmaker Emile de Antonio helped cut down the filmed material to 90 minutes long. The film is interspersed with parts of an interview with Charles Bukowski. Performers include Allen Ginsberg, Kenward Elmslie, and Anne Waldman. A CD-ROM version was released with poems which were never in the film. All 47 hours of footage are held at the Art Gallery of Ontario.

== Release ==
The film was originally released in theaters. It was later released on VHS, LaserDisc, and DVD. It was released on VHS in 1986 and on DVD in 2002, with an additional hour of content, and a new 8 minute interview with Mann.

== Reception ==
A review in the book Of-Hollywood Movies says, "If you aren't a student of contemporary poetry, Poetry in Motion serves as an excellent introduction. If you are, it's orgasmic". The film has been criticized for including only four Canadian poets, but proponents stated that "the film is a new genre that elides criticism based in nationalism".
