= John Hofsess =

Canadian writer, filmmaker and right-to-die activist (1938–2016)

- Born: May 27, 1938
- Died: February 29, 2016 (aged 77) near Basel, Switzerland
- Education: McMaster University
- Occupations: Writer; filmmaker; activist

John Hofsess (May 27, 1938 – February 29, 2016) was a Canadian writer, filmmaker and right-to-die activist.

== Early life and education ==
John Hofsess was born May 27, 1938, to Jack and Gladys Hofsess. He began working as a busboy at 15 at McMaster University in Hamilton, Ontario and, due to his parents' ill health, became the family's breadwinner at age 23.

At age 25 Hofsess enrolled in McMaster University and, while continuing to work as a busboy there, began to study English. Three years later, in 1966, Hofsess founded the McMaster Film Board, alongside Ivan Reitman, who would later direct National Lampoon's Animal House, and the first Ghostbusters film, and produce the sequel. During this time, Hofsess produced 1967's Palace of Pleasure (which had a brief David Cronenberg cameo) and Columbus of Sex, which were praised by avant-garde critics.

Columbus of Sex, which Hofsess made for US$3,000 while attending McMaster, was re-edited with new footage and retitled as My Secret Life for U.S. release in the early 1970s. It was later seized by Hamilton police, and Hofsess and Reitman were charged with obscenity. They were both found innocent, but the film was destroyed.

== Later work ==
After being charged with obscenity, Hofsess never worked on another film. He did however found the Filmmakers Co-operative of Canada alongside Peter Rowe and later became a film critic. Hofsess would also publish Inner Views in 1975, a collection of interviews with numerous Canadian filmmakers.

=== Right-to-die activism ===
Hofsess had long been a supporter of assisted suicide, but the suicide of Canadian filmmaker Claude Jutra in 1986, following a diagnosis of early-onset Alzheimer's disease, was noted by him and others to be the tipping point for Hofsess progression into activism. In 1991, Hofsess created the Right to Die Society of Canada which targeted laws that made assisting suicide a crime. Hofsess would also create the magazine Last Rights, which dealt with similar subjects.

== Death ==
At 77, Hofsess was diagnosed with terminal pulmonary fibrosis and prostate cancer; he also suffered from an unstable heart. In his final weeks, he said "my quality of life has disintegrated". After assisting in the suicide of others in at least eight instances, Hofsess took his own life at a clinic of the Eternal Spirit Foundation, near Basel, Switzerland, on February 29, 2016.
