= Charley Lippincott =

Author and marketer (1939–2020)

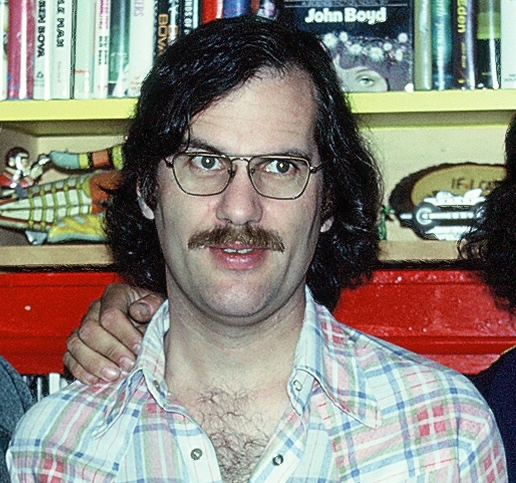
Lippincott at the Ackermansion in 1978

Charles Myers Lippincott Jr. (October 28, 1939 – May 19, 2020) was an author and marketer, best known for promoting and licensing the first part of the Star Wars trilogy. Lippincott joined Lucasfilm in 1975 as Vice President of Advertising, Publicity, Promotion & Merchandising. He also teamed up with Marvel Comics for a tie-in series which debuted ahead of the film's release. He was responsible for convincing 20th Century Fox to trademark the film's content, allowing significant income from licensing and merchandising on such products as "action figures, comic books, lunchboxes, watches, and toy lightsabers".

Lippincott promoted Star Wars directly to fans, going on promotional tours with such stars as Mark Hamill. He had a non-traditional approach to film publicity, including a panel discussion at San Diego Comic-Con in 1976, and partnerships with popular television shows at the time including The Richard Pryor Show and The Donny & Marie Show.

In 1978, Lippincott moved on from Lucasfilm and did publicity for other films including Alien and Flash Gordon. He also produced movies such as Night Life, as well as the comic book adaptation for Judge Dredd.

== Personal life ==
Lippincott was born in Adams, Massachusetts and grew up in Oswego, Illinois. He received a bachelor’s degree in Anthropology from Northwestern University, and then attended USC with George Lucas. From there, he got an early job as a publicist at Metro-Goldwyn-Mayer, working on such movies as Westworld and Family Plot. He was married to Geraldine “Bumpy” Lippincott.
