= Perry Hoberman =

American artist

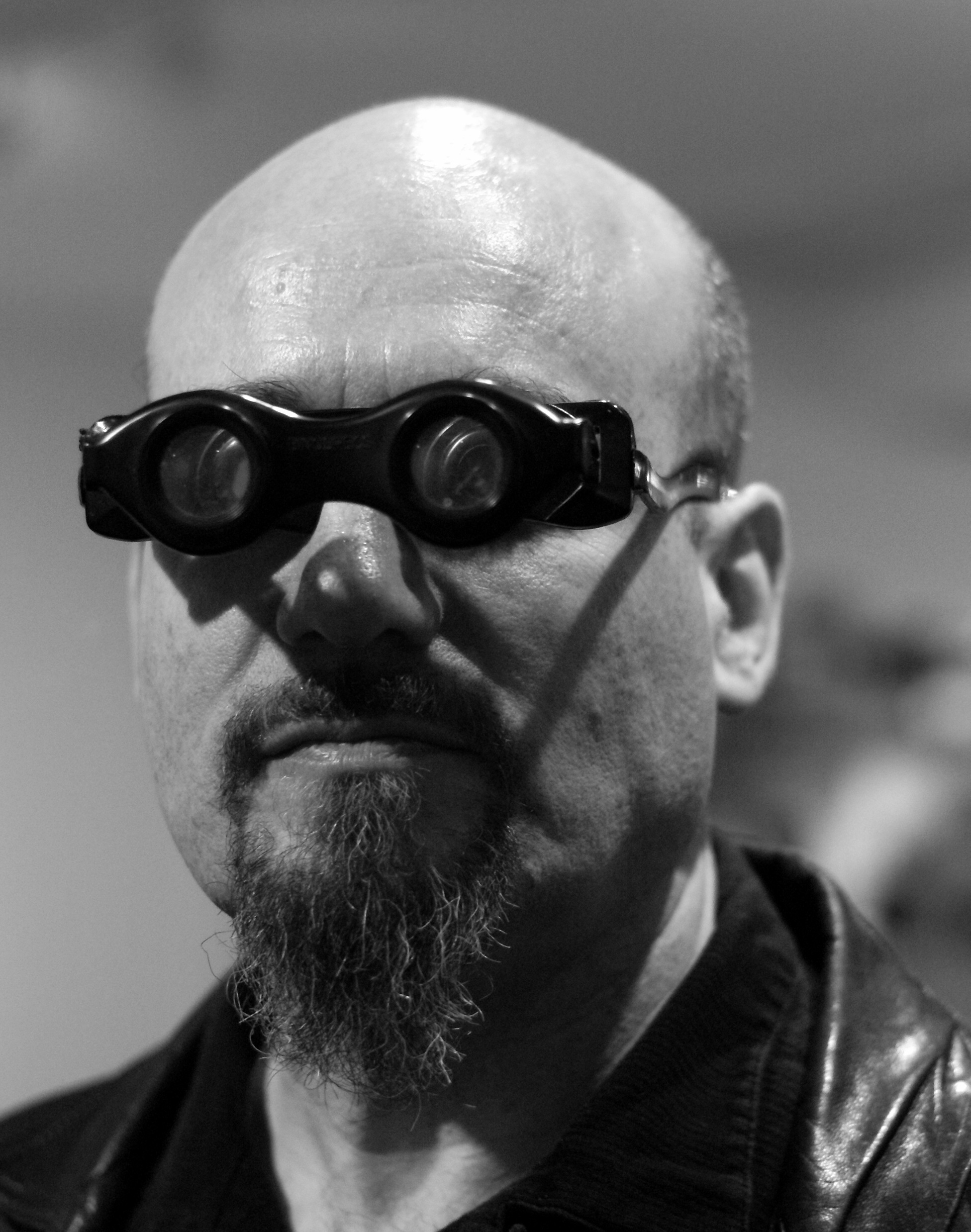
- Born: 1954
- Years active: 1983 to present
- Known for: New Media Art

Perry Hoberman (born 1954), is an installation artist who has worked extensively with machines and media. His career has included stints with Laurie Anderson and the USC Interactive Media Division.

He has taught at the Cooper Union School of Art, the San Francisco Art Institute, and the graduate Computer Art Department in the school of Visual Arts in New York. He is currently an Associate Research Professor in the Interactive Media Division at the University of Southern California School of Cinema-Television, as well as a visiting artist at the California Institute of the Arts.

His work is included in collection of the Museum of Modern Art, New York.

== Education ==
Hoberman started at the Pennsylvania Academy of Art in Philadelphia in 1972, and earned his bachelor's degree from Bennington College in Bennington, Vermont (1974–77). In 1978, he participated in an independent study program at Whitney Museum in New York.

== Work ==
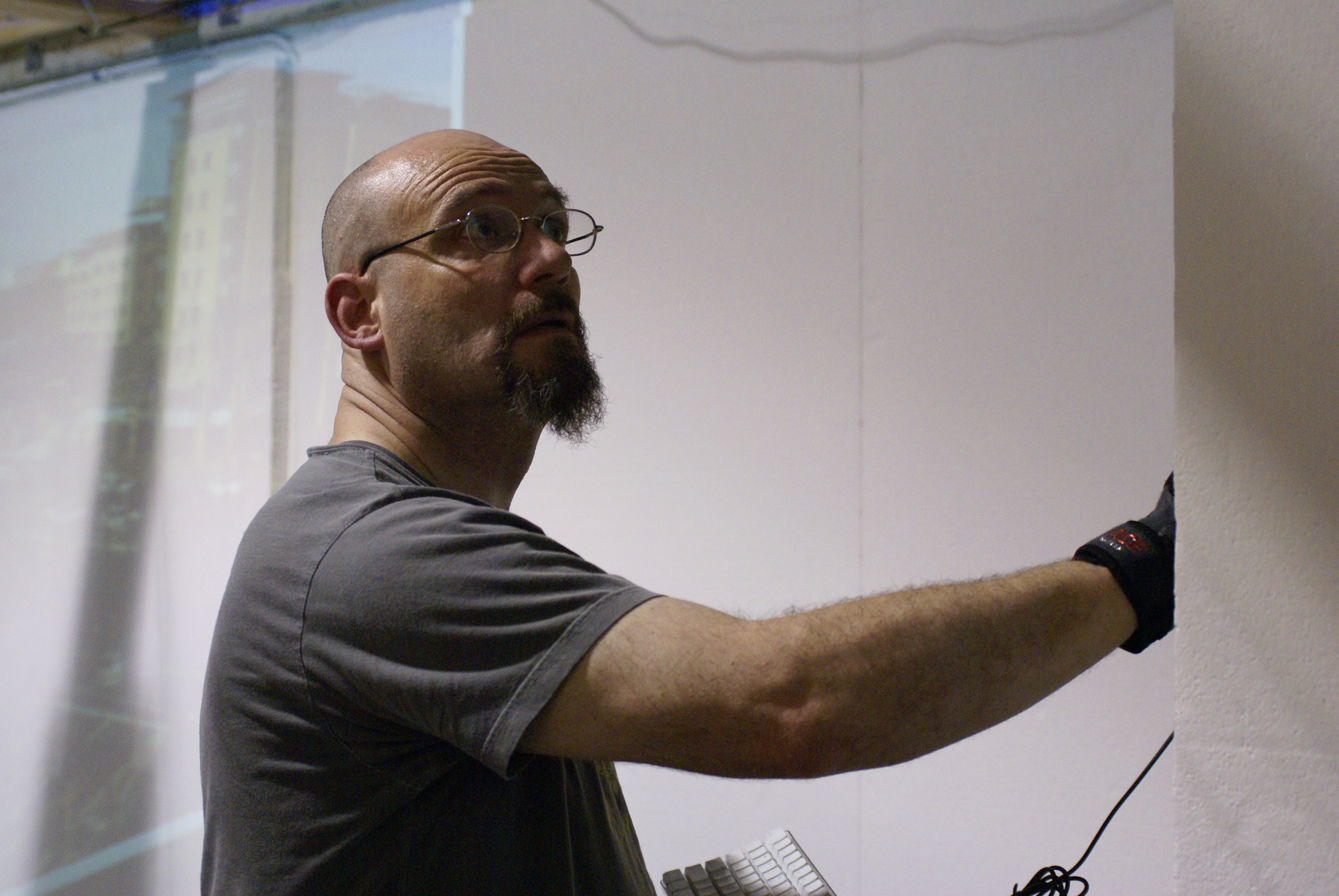
Perry Hoberman at work.

Hoberman's work focuses on the interactive nature of people and technology. Bar Code Hotel and Systems Maintenance are two exhibitions that demonstrate this aspect.

=== Bar Code Hotel ===
Bar Code Hotel recycles the ubiquitous symbols found on every consumer product to create a multi-user interface to an unruly virtual environment. The installation makes use of a number of strategies to create a casual, social, multi-person interface. The public simultaneously influences and interacts with computer-generated objects in an oversized three-dimensional projection, scanning and transmitting printed bar code information instantaneously into the computer system. The objects, each corresponding to a different user, exist as semi-autonomous agents that are only partially under the control of their human collaborators.

=== Systems Maintenance ===
Systems Maintenance consists of three versions of a furnished room. An ensemble of life-sized furniture occupies a large circular platform on the floor, a virtual room is displayed on a computer monitor, and a 1/8 size physical scale model of the room is presented on a small pedestal. Each version is imaged by a camera (either video or virtual), and the three resulting images are combined into a single large-scale video projection. The camera position, height, angle and field of view are matched between the three cameras. By moving the furniture and camera viewpoints for each of the three rooms, visitors can match or mismatch the components of each of the rooms as they appear in the projected image.

== Academic appointments ==
- 2006–2011 Associate Research Professor, Interactive Media Division, USC School of Cinematic Arts
- 2005–2006 Visiting Research Professor, Interactive Media Division, USC School of Cinematic Arts
- 2003–2005 Visiting Professor, Interactive Media Division, USC School of Cinema-Television
- 1999–2003 Adjunct Faculty, MFA Photography, School of Visual Arts, New York
- 1996–2003 Adjunct Faculty, MFA Computer Arts, School of Visual Arts, New York
- 1992–1994 Adjunct Faculty, Cooper Union, New York
- 1991 Visiting Faculty, San Francisco Art Institute

== Solo exhibitions ==
- Symptomatic - 2001 - National Museum of Photography, Film & Television, Bradford
- Cathartic User Interface - 2000 - Postmasters Gallery, New York
- Timetable - 2000 - Postmasters Gallery, New York
- Faraday’s Garden - 1999 - Kingston-Upon-Hull, New York
- Systems Maintenance and "Faraday's Garden - 1998 - Cornerhouse Gallery, Manchester, New York
- Lightpools or El Bal del Fanalet - 1998 - Fundació Joan Miró, Barcelona, Spain
- Unexpected Obstacles - 1998 - Karlsruhe, Germany
- Sorry We're Open - 1998 - Postmasters Gallery, New York
- Faraday's Islands - 1995 - Boston University, Massachusetts
- Bar Code Hotel - 1994 - Walter Phillips Gallery, Banff Centre for the Arts, Alberta, Canada
- Zombies, Has-Beens & Excess Baggage - 1992 - Postmasters Gallery, New York
- Faraday's Garden - 1991 - Museum of Contemporary Art, Dayton, Ohio
- Corporate Entities - 1998 - Postmasters Gallery, New York
- Lightleakers - 1986 - Postmasters Gallery, New York
- Dead Space/Living Rooms" - 1985 Capp Street Project, San Francisco
- Works in 3D (Stereoshadows) - 1985 Postmasters Gallery, New York
- Inside Out - 1984 - Galerie Pon, Zurich, Switzerland
- Out of the Picture - 1983 - Hallwalls, Buffalo, New York

== Awards ==
- Guggenheim Fellow - 2002
- Rockefeller Media Arts Fellow - 2002
- Grand Prix - 1999 - ICC Biennale
- Bradford Fellowship - 2001 (National Museum of Photography, Film & Television / Bradford College / University of Bradford)
- Award of Distinction in Interactive Art - 1999 - Prix Ars Electronica
- First Place, art's_edge Multimedia Competition - 1999 - Art Western Australian Academy of Performing Arts
- Design Distinction - 1997 - I.D. Interactive Media Design Review, New York
- Archetype Award for Overall Excellence - 1995 - Interactive Media Festival
