= Dial-A-Poem =

Public poetry service established in 1968

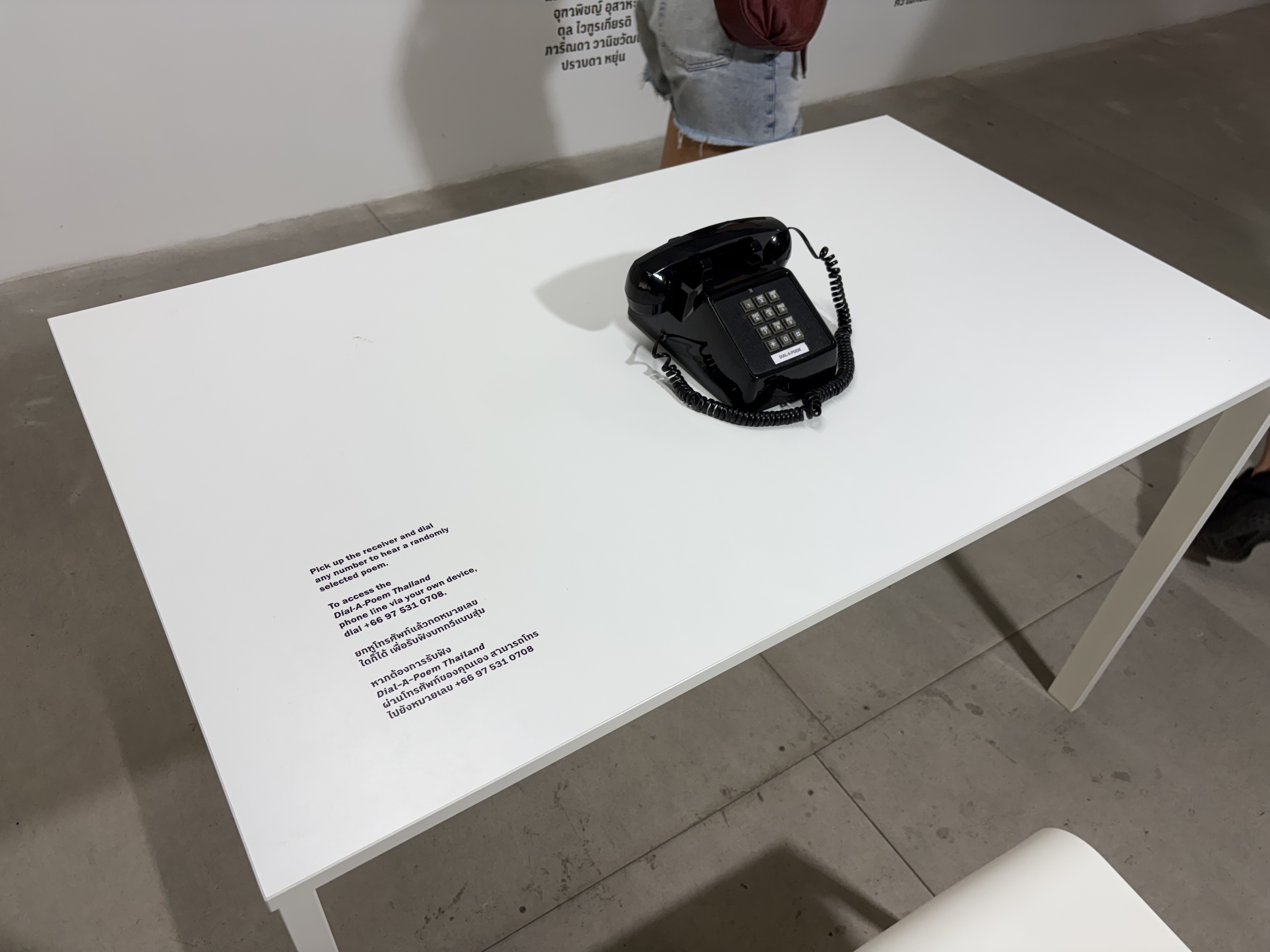
Dial-A-Poem Thailand, a Thai iteration of the service on permanent display at the Bangkok Kunsthalle in Bangkok, Thailand

Dial-A-Poem is a public poetry service established in 1968 by the late poet, artist and activist John Giorno after a phone conversation with William Burroughs. The service enabled members of the public to call Giorno Poetry Systems and to listen to a poem selected at random by writers including Amiri Baraka, William Burroughs, John Cage, Allen Ginsberg, Bobby Seale, Patti Smith and Anne Waldman. Installed first at the Architectural League of New York (in January 1969) before moving to the Museum of Contemporary Art in Chicago for six weeks (in November 1969) and then to the Museum of Modern Art in New York (in July 1970), the venture received widespread media attention. However, it was also known for its counter-cultural content – including polemics, Black Panther speeches, Buddhist mantras and queer love poetry – and following complaints and an investigation by the FBI, the service was shut down in 1970.

Dial-a-Poem has had a number of iterations since Giorno’s original service, including the Museum of Modern Art's 'Ecstatic Alphabets/Heaps of Language' exhibition and Ugo Rondinone’s 2017 ‘I ♥ John Giorno’ exhibition at the Red Bull Arts Gallery in New York. Dial-A-Poem Montreal ran from 1985 to 1987, and recently resumed with a 2020-2021 edition. In 2020, a new version of the service was launched as a mobile app from Nottingham Trent University and the Arts and Humanities Research Council.
