= Ron Mann =

Canadian filmmaker

- Born: Ronald Mann; June 13, 1958 (age 68); Toronto, Ontario, Canada
- Occupation: Film director
- Years active: 1970s–present

Ronald Mann (born June 13, 1958) is a Canadian documentary film director.

His work includes the films Imagine the Sound (1981); Comic Book Confidential (1988); Grass (1999) and Go Further (2003), both of which feature Woody Harrelson; In the Wake of the Flood (2010), which features author Margaret Atwood; and Altman (2014), about the life and career of film director Robert Altman.

== Early life ==
Mann stated that the first film he watched was This Is Cinerama, a documentary. He considers A Hard Day's Night his favourite film and stated that it "really changed my life" as it made him choose to become a filmmaker rather than a musician.

== Career ==
=== 1970s–1980s ===
Mann began making films at a young age, creating Super 8mm films in the 1970s. Mann worked at Sam the Record Man for three years and saved money to produce his first 16mm film, Flak, in 1975. He was influenced by Robert Kramer's Ice, John Cassavetes's Shadows, Michelangelo Antonioni's Red Desert, and Norman Mailer's Maidstone.

Mann began making short films while in high school and studied briefly at Vermont's Bennington College before receiving a B.A. in film from the University of Toronto. His 1973 student film, The Strip, documented the historic Yonge Street strip.

Mann met Elia Kazan at the Cannes Film Festival and asked if he should go to film school. Kazan told him not to study film, but to make them instead. Mann did not attend film school; instead, he learned filmmaking first-hand and using his own funds. In an interview with Now, he described this process:

Every film was my last movie, I would go into debt, make another film to get myself out of debt. That's how I actually needed to keep going.

Mann and David Fine started collaborating in 1978. One of their films, The Only Game in Town, received a Genie Award nomination for Best Theatrical Short Film.

Mann attempted to make a documentary about the new wave music concert Heat Wave, but licensing issues prevented him. After the success of The Only Game in Town he met Emile de Antonio, who agreed to become the film's executive producer. However, five days before filming started Mann was told that they did not have enough money. Mann decided to instead make a film about avant-garde jazz, Imagine the Sound. The film, released in 1981, deals with the once-controversial genre of free jazz. Critic and film historian Jonathan Rosenbaum has said that Imagine the Sound "may be the best documentary on free jazz that we have."

Poetry in Motion (1982) was Mann's second feature film after Imagine the Sound. While watching John Giorno and William S. Burroughs at a rock club, Mann discovered Giorno's Dial-A-Poem recordings during a break in the performance. The director later decided to create an anthology of "post-Beat" poets for a film. His idea was based on the poem anthology publication The New American Poetry 1945–1960 by Donald Allen.

Mann met Joe Medjuck while attending the University of Toronto and Medjuck hired him in 1984, for Listen to the City, his only fiction film. Mann received a three-picture contract with Ivan Reitman Productions. Mann wrote a comedy for Bill Murray, Hoods in the Woods, and made a behind-the-scenes documentary for Legal Eagles.

Mann has also made numerous short films, including Echoes Without Saying (1983), about the publishing and printing company Coach House Press and its founder Stan Bevington, and Marcia Resnick's Bad Boys (1985), about the New York based photographer.

Mann found success with his 1988 documentary Comic Book Confidential. The film is a survey of the history of the comic book medium in the United States from the 1930s to the 1980s, as an art form and in social context. Confidential was first released theatrically in Canada in 1988, and in the United States on April 27, 1989. The film received the 1989 Genie Award for Best Feature Length Documentary from the Academy of Canadian Cinema and Television. Caryn James of The New York Times found the film deft and intelligent—it "takes off when it abandons the archives and focuses on the creators," but "it plays to the converted," and its attempt to relate comics to social context is "fleeting."

=== 1990s–2000s ===
Mann continued to make documentaries throughout the 1990s and 2000s. His 1999 film was Grass, a documentary about the history of the United States government's war on marijuana in the 20th century. Narrated by actor Woody Harrelson, it premiered at the 1999 Toronto International Film Festival and won the Genie Award for Best Feature Length Documentary. His 2003 film, Go Further, saw him re-team with Harrelson on a film that followed a group of environmental activists riding around in a large, bio-fueled bus. The film debuted at the South by Southwest Film Festival in March 2003, and at the Toronto International Film Festival in September 2003, where it was first runner-up for the People's Choice Award. It was also nominated for a Genie Award for Best Documentary.

In 2003, Mann co-founded a film distribution company called FilmsWeLike with Gary Topp. FilmWeLike's curation has been described by Vice as a "veritable auteur smorgasbord."

In 2009, he released a documentary on mushrooms and mushroom hunting called Know Your Mushrooms.

=== 2010s–present ===
In 2014, Mann directed the Robert Altman-based documentary Altman. Peter Bradshaw of The Guardian praised the film.

His latest film is Carmine Street Guitars (2018). The film depicts Carmine Street Guitars, a long-running guitar store in New York City. It premiered at the 75th Venice International Film Festival, and had its Canadian premiere at the 2018 Toronto International Film Festival. It went into general theatrical release in April 2019.

In January 2026, the Toronto Film Critics Association named Mann the winner of its annual Company 3 TFCA Luminary Award for his career achievements.

== Impact ==
Mann has served as mentor to and worked with many filmmakers from the Toronto New Wave of the 1980s, including Atom Egoyan, Bruce McDonald, Jeremy Podeswa, and Peter Mettler.

== Filmography ==
- The Only Game in Town (1979)
- Imagine the Sound (1981)
- Poetry in Motion (1982)
- Comic Book Confidential (1988)
- The Twist (1992)
- Dream Tower (1994)
- Grass (1999)
- Go Further (2003)
- Tales of the Rat Fink (2006)
- Know Your Mushrooms (2008)
- In the Wake of the Flood (2010) featuring author Margaret Atwood
- Altman (2014)
- Carmine Street Guitars (2018)
- Clairtone (2026)

== Works cited ==
- Beard, William; White, Jerry (2002). North of everything: English-Canadian Cinema Since 1980. The University of Alberta Press. ISBN 0-88864-398-5.
