= Roma Baran =

Canadian record producer

- Origin: Canada
- Occupation: Record producer

Roma Baran (born 1946 or 1947) is a Canadian record producer who is best known for her work with Laurie Anderson, Rosalie Sorrels, Annabelle Chvostek, and Kate & Anna McGarrigle. Much of her production work is done as a duo with business partner Vivian Stoll.

Originally from Montreal, Baran has lived in New York City since 1976. She was raised in the Polish Catholic Church, learning only in her 60s that her parents were, in fact, Jews who had nominally converted to Catholicism and changed their names to protect themselves during the Holocaust. She learned at the same time (2009) the existence from her French cousin whose history was identical.

Baran was also an Academy Award nominee in 1992 for co-producing the documentary film Music for the Movies: Bernard Herrmann.
