= John Giorno =

American poet and performance artist (1936–2019)

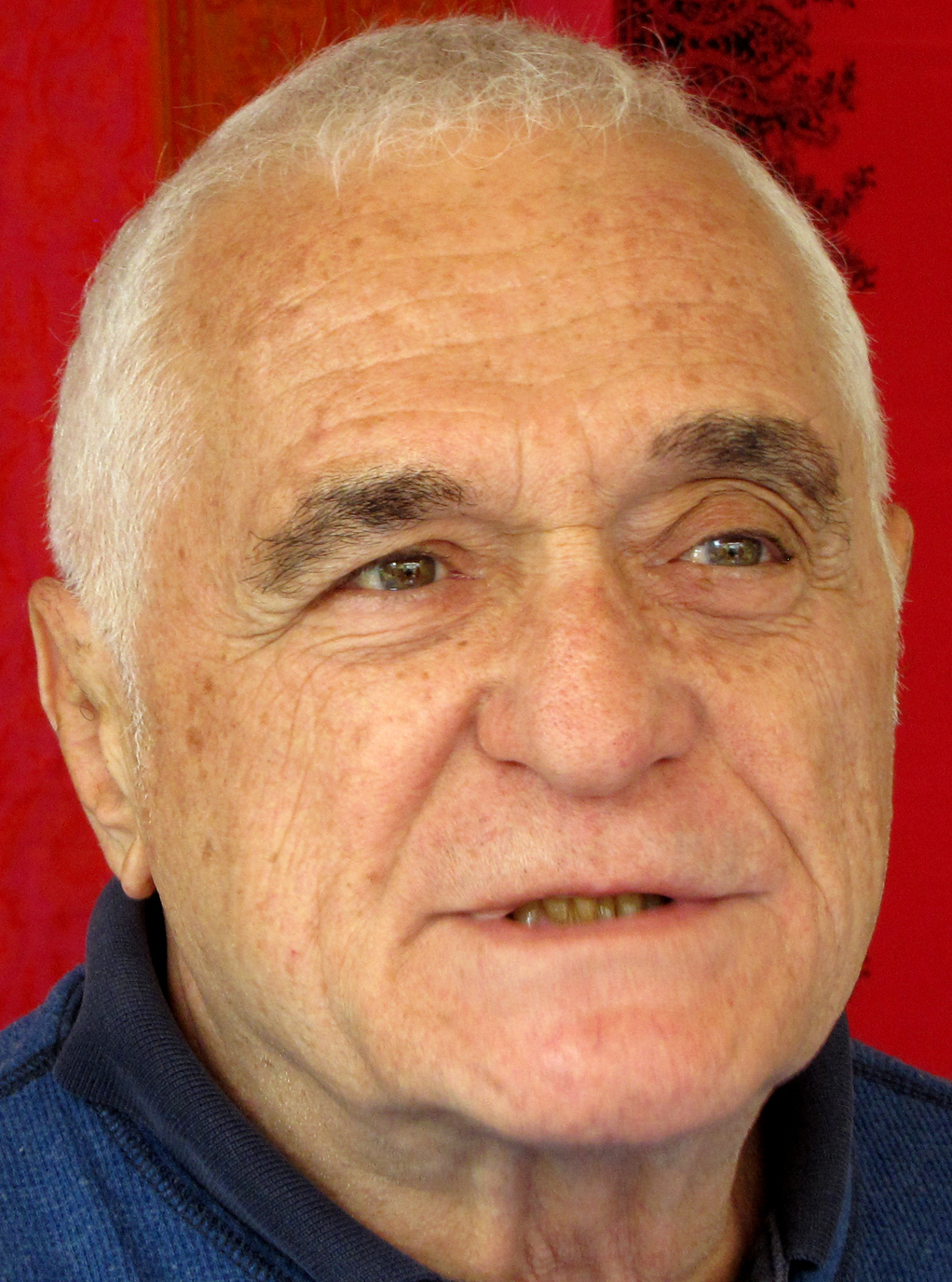
- Giorno in 2010
- Born: December 4, 1936; New York City, U.S.
- Died: October 11, 2019 (aged 82); New York City, U.S.
- Education: Columbia University
- Occupations: Poet; performance artist
- Spouse: Ugo Rondinone (m. 2017)
- Website: giornofoundation.org

John Giorno (December 4, 1936 – October 11, 2019) was an American poet, performance artist, multimedia artist, and activist. A leading figure in the New York avant-garde, he was known for expanding the possibilities of poetry through sound, performance, recordings, telecommunications, and visual art. In 1965, he founded Giorno Poetry Systems, a nonprofit organization dedicated to promoting poetry through innovative media, and in 1969 launched Dial-A-Poem, a telephone-based poetry project that brought contemporary poetry to a mass audience.

Giorno was associated with artists and writers including Andy Warhol, Robert Rauschenberg, Jasper Johns, William S. Burroughs, Allen Ginsberg, and Brion Gysin. He was Warhol's lover and appeared in the artist's early experimental films, including Sleep (1964). His own work evolved from found-text poetry influenced by Pop art and cut-up techniques into a distinctive style characterized by repetition and spoken-word performance.

A practicing Tibetan Buddhist for nearly five decades, Giorno integrated Buddhist philosophy into his poetry and artistic practice. In 1984, he founded the AIDS Treatment Project through Giorno Poetry Systems to provide direct financial assistance to people living with AIDS. His work has been exhibited internationally and is regarded as influential in the development of performance poetry and multimedia art.

== Early life and education ==
John Giorno was born on December 4, 1936, in New York City, the only child of Amadeo and Nancy (Garbarino) Giorno. He was raised in Brooklyn and Roslyn Heights, Long Island. His father owned a clothing manufacturing company, while his mother was a fashion designer.

Giorno attended James Madison High School in Brooklyn, where he developed an interest in literature through his English teachers. He later studied at Columbia University and graduated in 1958. At Columbia, he was a resident of Livingston Hall and classmates with physicist Hans Christian von Baeyer. After college he briefly worked as a stockbroker before becoming involved with New York's emerging artistic and literary communities.

== Career ==
=== Early artistic career and affairs ===
During the early 1960s, Giorno became acquainted with artists and writers including Ted Berrigan, Jonas Mekas, Robert Rauschenberg, Jasper Johns, and Andy Warhol. In October 1962, Giorno met Warhol during the artist's New York solo exhibition at the Stable Gallery. Warhol featured Giorno in his experimental films John Washing (1963), a 4½-minute short, and the Sleep (1964), which depicts Giorno sleeping for more than five hours. Inspired by Warhol, Rauschenberg, and Johns, Giorno began incorporating techniques of appropriation and found text into his poetry. This culminated in The American Book of the Dead (1964), portions of which were later published in his first poetry collection, Poems (1967), which featured cover art by Rauschenberg.

In 1965, Giorno also met writer William S. Burroughs and artist Brion Gysin. Their experiments with cut-up and montage techniques profoundly influenced his work, and through Gysin he produced his first audio poems, "Subway Sound," which was presented at the Paris Museum of Modern Art Biennale in 1965. Giorno celebrated queer identity throughout his writing such as "Pornographic Poem" (1965).

=== Giorno Poetry Systems and Electronic Sensory Poetry Environments ===
In 1965, believing that poetry lagged behind developments in visual art, music, and performance, Giorno founded Giorno Poetry Systems (GPS), a nonprofit organization dedicated to presenting poetry to new audiences using innovative technologies. Over the following decades, GPS produced numerous recordings, books, performances, films, and multimedia projects featuring Giorno and a wide range of poets, musicians, and visual artists.

In 1967, through a chance meeting at Rauschenberg's apartment on Lafayette street, Giorno met Bell Laboratories engineer Fred Waldhauer, who was developing an electronic device that converted sound into colored light. The two collaborated throughout the summer, with Waldhauer adapting the "light organ" to visualize Giorno's sound poems by translating pitch into color and volume into brightness. Giorno began incorporating the technology into performances and installations later that year.

In February 1968, he premiered the work in a performance of Purple Heart at the Architectural League of New York as part of the Electronic Sensory Poetry Environments (ESPE) series. The performance combined electronic sound compositions created with Robert Moog and the light organ, which analyzed the audio and displayed it through banks of colored lights.

=== Dial-A-Poem ===
In 1968, inspired by a conversation with Burroughs, Giorno conceived Dial-A-Poem, an installation that allowed callers to hear recordings of contemporary poetry over the telephone. Launched in 1969 using multiple telephone lines connected to reel-to-reel answering machines, Dial-A-Poem featured recordings by poets including Allen Ginsberg, Anne Waldman, Ron Padgett, Peter Schjeldahl, and later contributions from numerous artists and political organizations, including the Black Panther Party.

The project attracted millions of callers and was included in the Museum of Modern Art's influential Dial-A-Poem exhibition in 1970. It became one of the earliest examples of telecommunications being used as an artistic medium.

From 1976 to 1979, Giorno also hosted The Poetry Experiment and presented his eight-part series Dial-A-Poem Poets, with Charles Ruas, on WBAI-Pacifica Radio.

=== Activism and Buddhism ===
During the late 1960s, Giorno's poetry evolved from direct appropriation of newspaper articles to montages of disparate texts and eventually to his signature double-column poems, which employed repetition across and down the page to recreate the echoes and distortions of his live performances. Many of these works were collected in Balling Buddha (1970). His poetry also became increasingly political, and he participated in protests against the Vietnam War. During the war, Giorno and activist Abbie Hoffman contributed broadcasts to U.S. troops over Radio Hanoi, prompting Vice President Spiro Agnew to describe them as "would-be Hanoi Hannahs." His work also appeared in the avant-garde literary magazine 0 to 9.

In 1971, Giorno traveled to India, where he met Dudjom Rinpoche, head of the Nyingma school of Tibetan Buddhism. He became one of the earliest Western students of Tibetan Buddhism and remained an active practitioner for the rest of his life, regularly inviting Tibetan Buddhist teachers to New York and hosting annual Buddhist gatherings at his Bowery home. Buddhist philosophy became a recurring theme in his poetry, particularly beginning with Cancer in My Left Ball (1972).

=== Later career ===
Throughout the 1970s and into the 1980s, Giorno toured internationally with Burroughs, developing an amplified style of performance poetry that combined spoken word with electronic sound. During this period, Giorno was a prominent figure in New York's avant-garde, performing at venues including CBGB and Judson Church, where he combined rock music with spoken-word poetry.

In 1982, Giorno released the spoken-word album Who Are You Staring At?, produced with Glenn Branca, and appeared prominently in Ron Mann's documentary Poetry in Motion (1982). From 1982 to 1989, he led the band John Giorno, which adapted his poetry into experimental musical performances.

In 1984, Giorno founded the AIDS Treatment Project through Giorno Poetry Systems, which provided direct financial assistance and support to people living with AIDS.

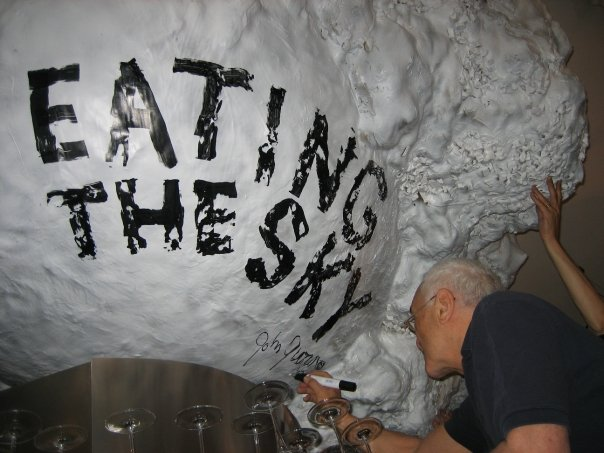
Giorno while signing one of his works in Monza, 2009

Beginning in the 1990s, Giorno developed his Poetry Paintings, in which he transformed excerpts from his poetry into large-scale painted text works. He continued to perform widely, particularly in Europe, where he became associated with the sound poetry movement. He performed with guitarist Rudolph Grey in the opera Agamemnon (1993).

In 2007, Giorno appeared in Nine Poems in Basilicata, a film directed by Antonello Faretta based on his poetry and performances. In addition to his solo spoken-word performances, he also collaborated with Spanish rock musician Javier Colis on a series of music-and-poetry performances.

In 2008, Soft Skull Press published Subduing Demons in America: Selected Poems 1962–2007, the first career-spanning collection of Giorno's poetry, edited by Marcus Boon.

In 2010, Giorno had his first one-person gallery show in New York City, entitled Black Paintings and Drawings, at the Nicole Klagsbrun Gallery, wherein he exhibited works that chronicled the evolution of the poem painting.

In 2011, Giorno starred in one of two versions for the music video to R.E.M.'s final single "We All Go Back to Where We Belong".

From October 2015 to January 2016, the retrospective Ugo Rondinone: I ♥ John Giorno, conceived by Giorno's husband, artist Ugo Rondinone, was presented at the Palais de Tokyo in Paris. The exhibition featured Giorno's work alongside contributions by artists including Angela Bulloch, Anne Collier, Judith Eisler, Pierre Huyghe, Elizabeth Peyton, Michael Stipe, Billy Sullivan, Rirkrit Tiravanija, and Warhol. In 2017, it expanded to citywide retrospective presented across nine nonprofit venues and fifteen partnering institutions in Manhattan. Organized into eight thematic sections, it brought together more than 300 artworks, 600 audio recordings of Giorno's poetry, and approximately 15,000 archival photographs and documents, tracing his career while examining his connections to the Beat Generation, Tibetan Buddhism, AIDS activism, and the New York avant-garde.

== Personal life ==
Giorno had an affair with Pop artist Andy Warhol from 1963 to 1964, after which they rarely saw one another. Reflecting on the relationship years later, Giorno said, "Andy was very difficult emotionally. We had this great love affair in a sense. But also not in a sense. Andy just liked occasionally giving blow jobs. Andy was peculiar. Occasionally he'd come over and give me a blow job for one reason or another, and that was the extent of it." In his memoir, he wrote that Warhol stopped returning his phone calls and excluded him from social gatherings, particularly a 1965 party for poet John Ashbery at the Factory, which upset him.

In the 1960s, Giorno had a fling with dancer Steve Paxton. He also had an affair with Paxton's partner artist Robert Rauschenberg from 1966 to 1968. The two drifted apart but they had a dalliance in 1972. Recalling his relationship with Rauschenberg, Giorno later said, "It was like making love to Alexander the Great or Emperor Hadrian. His body radiated the worldly power of great accomplishments."

Giorno had a romance with artist Jasper Johns from 1968 to 1969. He later admitted, "I was the cause of all the trouble and problems in my relationship with Jasper. I was the one who was attached to the 1960s culture, and who was deluded in believing that psychedelic drugs had magical powers, that poetry, art, and political action could change the world for the better. I felt exiled in domestic life. Jasper just wanted a sane, simple, fulfilling relationship with a man he loved."

Giorno also had a sexual relationship with his close friend, writer William S. Burroughs. In his memoir, he wrote, "I wanted to thank William for being a great hero of gay sexual freedom. I wanted to reward him for his noble efforts. … I wanted to offer him bliss."

Giorno met Swiss artist Ugo Rondinone on March 11, 1998, after Rondinone attended one of his poetry performances and contacted him about a potential collaboration. The two instead began a romantic relationship, while also collaborating on a number of artistic projects over the following years. On February 10, 2017, Giorno married Rondinone, who was 26 years his junior.

Giorno lived at 255 East 74th Street, when a small carriage house was located on the property. He later lived and worked from three lofts at 222 Bowery on the Lower East Side.

== Death ==
Giorno died of a heart attack at age 82 on October 11, 2019, at his home in Lower Manhattan. He was survived by his husband Ugo Rondinone.

== Legacy ==
Giorno's artwork Poem Prints (1991) is held in the permanent collection of the Pérez Art Museum Miami as part of the Sackner Archive of Concrete and Visual Poetry acquisition.

In 2020, Farrar, Straus and Giroux published Giorno's posthumous memoir, Great Demon Kings: A Memoir of Poetry, Sex, Art, Death, and Enlightenment.
