= Talk Normal: The Laurie Anderson Anthology =

Greatest hits album by Laurie Anderson
- Released: October 17, 2000
- Genres: Avant-garde; experimental; spoken word
- Labels: Warner Bros.; Rhino; Atlantic
- Producer: Laurie Anderson

Laurie Anderson chronology
The Ugly One with the Jewels and Other Stories (1995)	Talk Normal: The Laurie Anderson Anthology (2000)	Life on a String (2001)

Professional ratings
Review scores
Source	Rating
AllMusic	3.5/5 stars
Entertainment Weekly	B+
The New Rolling Stone Album Guide	4/5 stars

Talk Normal: The Laurie Anderson Anthology is a retrospective of the seven albums recorded by American experimental music composer Laurie Anderson for Warner Bros. Records. All tracks had been previously released. This was the final Anderson release on the main Warner Bros. label before moving to the subsidiary Nonesuch.

== Track listing ==
All tracks written by Laurie Anderson unless otherwise indicated.

=== Disc 1 ===
1. "O Superman (for Massenet)" – 8:21 (from Big Science)
2. "From the Air" – 4:35 (from Big Science)
3. "Big Science" – 6:22 (from Big Science)
4. "Born, Never Asked" – 4:57 (from Big Science)
5. "It Tango" – 3:02 (from Big Science)
6. "Gravity's Angel" – 6:04 (from Mister Heartbreak)
7. "Excellent Birds" – 3:13 (Laurie Anderson, Peter Gabriel) (from Mister Heartbreak)
8. "Langue D'Amour" – 6:15 (from Mister Heartbreak)
9. "Sharkey's Day" (single edit) – 4:07 (from Mister Heartbreak)
10. "Walk the Dog" – 6:42 (from United States Live)
11. "Cartoon Song" – 1:12 (from United States Live)
12. "So Happy Birthday" – 6:22 (from United States Live)
13. "City Song" – 3:33 (from United States Live)
14. "The Big Top" – 2:51 (from United States Live)
15. "Dr. Miller" – 5:18 (Laurie Anderson, Perry Hoberman) (from United States Live)
16. "Lighting Out for the Territories" – 3:11 (from United States Live)

=== Disc 2 ===
1. "Smoke Rings" – 7:03 (from Home of the Brave)
2. "Talk Normal" – 5:31 (from Home of the Brave)
3. "Language Is a Virus" – 4:14 (from Home of the Brave)
4. "Credit Racket" – 3:32 (from Home of the Brave)
5. "Strange Angels" – 3:50 (from Strange Angels)
6. "Baby Doll" – 3:37 (from Strange Angels)
7. "Coolsville" – 4:34 (from Strange Angels)
8. "My Eyes" – 5:28 (from Strange Angels)
9. "The Dream Before" – 3:03 (from Strange Angels)
10. "The Day the Devil" – 3:59 (Laurie Anderson, Peter Laurence Gordon) (from Strange Angels)
11. "Speak My Language" – 3:38 (from Bright Red)
12. "Love Among the Sailors" – 2:51 (from Bright Red)
13. "Poison" – 3:45 (Laurie Anderson, Brian Eno) (from Bright Red)
14. "In Our Sleep" – 2:34 (Laurie Anderson, Lou Reed) (from Bright Red)
15. "Night in Baghdad" – 3:28 (from Bright Red)
16. "The Night Flight from Houston" – 1:33 (from The Ugly One with the Jewels)
17. "The Rotowhirl" – 3:54 (from The Ugly One with the Jewels)
18. "The Ouija Board" – 4:11 (from The Ugly One with the Jewels)
19. "The End of the World" – 5:00 (from The Ugly One with the Jewels)
