= The Ugly One with the Jewels =

The Ugly One with the Jewels and Other Stories

Live album by Laurie Anderson
- Released: March 1995
- Genres: Avant-garde; experimental; spoken word
- Length: 70:53
- Label: Warner Bros.
- Producer: Laurie Anderson

Laurie Anderson chronology
Bright Red (1994)	The Ugly One with the Jewels and Other Stories (1995)	Talk Normal: The Laurie Anderson Anthology (2000)

Professional ratings
Review scores
Source	Rating
AllMusic	4.5/5 stars
Robert Christgau	B+
Rolling Stone Album Guide	3/5 stars

The Ugly One with the Jewels and Other Stories (subtitled A Reading from Stories From the Nerve Bible) is the second live album, first spoken-word album, and the sixth album overall released by American avant-garde artist Laurie Anderson, released on Warner Bros. Records on March 14, 1995. It was the last of the seven-album deal that she signed in the early 1980s.

An immediate follow-up to her album of only a few months earlier, Bright Red, The Ugly One with the Jewels consisted of stories and monologues taken from Anderson's performance piece, Stories from the Nerve Bible. Many of the pieces are autobiographical (including one in which she reminisces about working on stage with the late comic Andy Kaufman). The album was recorded live in London, England. Although most of the pieces are spoken word, they have musical accompaniment, with the exception of "The Cultural Ambassador".

Two previously recorded pieces are performed again on this album: the poem "White Lily", which was earlier performed in Anderson's 1986 concert film Home of the Brave, and "Same Time Tomorrow", which closes this album just as it closed Bright Red.

Discounting a greatest hits collection which followed in 2000 (Talk Normal: The Laurie Anderson Anthology), this was the final Laurie Anderson album to be released by the main Warner Bros. Records label. Commencing with her next new release, Life on a String, Anderson moved to the Warner subsidiary label, Nonesuch Records.

== Track listing ==
All tracks composed by Laurie Anderson

1. "The End of the World" – 5:00
2. "The Salesman" – 3:19
3. "The Night Flight from Houston" – 1:33
4. "Word of Mouth" – 4:50
5. "The Soul is a Bird" – 3:56
6. "The Ouija Board" – 4:11
7. "The Ugly One with the Jewels" – 5:06
8. "The Geographic North Pole" – 5:22
9. "John Lilly" – 3:34
10. "The Rotowhirl" – 3:54
11. "On the Way to Jerusalem" – 1:20
12. "The Hollywood Strangler" – 1:50
13. "Maria Teresa Teresa Maria" – 5:43
14. "Someone Else's Dream" – 2:25
15. "White Lily" – 1:17
16. "The Mysterious 'J'" – 2:57
17. "The Cultural Ambassador" – 6:47
18. "Same Time Tomorrow" – 7:49

== Personnel ==
- Laurie Anderson – vocals, keyboards, violin
- Joey Baron – drums
- Cyro Baptista – gong, surdo
- Greg Cohen – bass, guitar, keyboards
