= Heart of a Dog (2015 film) =

2015 film

- Theatrical release poster
- Directed by: Laurie Anderson
- Written by: Laurie Anderson
- Produced by: Laurie Anderson; Dan Janvey
- Cinematography: Laurie Anderson; Toshiaki Ozawa; Joshua Zucker-Plada
- Edited by: Melody London; Katherine Nolfi
- Music by: Laurie Anderson
- Production companies: Arte; Canal Street Communications; Celluloid Dreams; Field Office
- Distributed by: Abramorama (United States)
- Release dates: September 4, 2015 (Telluride); October 21, 2015 (United States)
- Running time: 75 minutes
- Country: United States
- Language: English

Heart of a Dog is a 2015 American documentary film directed by American visual artist and composer Laurie Anderson.

== Summary ==
Heart of a Dog was commissioned by Franco-German TV station Arte and centers on Anderson's remembrances of her late beloved piano-playing and finger-painting dog Lolabelle. Scenes range from realistic footage from the animal's life to imagined scenes of Lolabelle's passage through the bardo. The film also features reflections on life and death, including Anderson's experiences in downtown New York after the September 11 terrorist attacks.

== Release and reception ==
Heart of a Dog was screened in the main competition section of the 72nd Venice International Film Festival after premiering at Telluride Film Festival on September 4, 2015.

Heart of a Dog was released to theaters on October 21, 2015, and received widespread critical acclaim. Based on 70 reviews collected by Rotten Tomatoes, the film received a 96% approval rating from 83 reviewers, with an average score of 8/10; the website's critical consensus reads, "Of a piece with much of director Laurie Anderson's idiosyncratic output, Heart of a Dog delves into weighty themes with lyrical, haunting grace." Metacritic, which assigns a rating in the 0–100 range based on reviews from top mainstream publications, calculated an average score of 84, based on 20 reviews. The film was nominated for Best Documentary at the 31st Independent Spirit Awards, and was shortlisted for the Academy Award for Best Documentary Feature on December 1, 2015.

== Soundtrack ==
A soundtrack album of the same name was released by Nonesuch Records on October 23, 2015. It featured audio, music, and spoken word pieces by Anderson from the film. The score was composed and performed entirely by her, and incorporated excerpts from her previous projects, including "Beautiful Pea Green Boat" (from the 1994 album Bright Red), "Rhumba Club" (from 2001's Life on a String), and Landfall (2011) with Kronos Quartet. The tracks "The Lake" and "Flow" were taken from Anderson's 2010 album Homeland. Her late husband Lou Reed's recording of "Turning Time Around", from his 2000 album Ecstasy, was included as the album's closing track.

Reviewing Heart of Dog for AllMusic, Mark Deming gave it four out of five stars and said it is "an album only Laurie Anderson could make, even as its sense of joy and tragedy set it apart from her best-known work". Andy Gill from The Independent found Anderson's observations on a variety of themes "by turns whimsical, sinister, sad and funny as well as surprisingly educational" on what was "a deeply moving soundtrack". Writing for Vice, Robert Christgau gave the record an "A+" and deemed it her best work yet because it "accrues power and complexity" with repeated listens, "75 minutes of sparsely but gorgeously and aptly orchestrated tales ... about life and death and what comes in the middle when you do them right, which is love." He later named it the best album of 2015 in his ballot for The Village Voice's annual Pazz & Jop critics poll and the seventh-best album of the 2010s.

=== Track listing ===
All songs were composed, produced, and performed by Laurie Anderson, except where noted.

No.	Title	Length
1.	"The Lake" (Instrumental)	1:32
2.	"Birth of Lola"	2:19
3.	"Tell All the Animals"	2:11
4.	"From the Air"	7:07
5.	"Phosphenes"	0:48
6.	"Lola Goes Blind"	3:12
7.	"Iron Mountain"	3:03
8.	"How to Feel Sad Without Being Sad"	2:08
9.	"The West Village"	1:42
10.	"Life Lived Backwards"	2:23
11.	"The Cloud"	2:12
12.	"A Different World"	1:53
13.	"What If the Sky Froze?"	1:54
14.	"Piano Lessons"	3:00
15.	"Animals Are Like People"	2:16
16.	"The Release of Love"	1:42
17.	"Three Ghosts"	2:29
18.	"The Bardo"	8:24
19.	"The Real World"	1:17
20.	"Dreaming of Life Before Birth"	1:40
21.	"A Story About a Story"	5:56
22.	"Flow"	2:13
23.	"Facebook"	1:36
24.	"Bring Her Some Flowers"	2:07
25.	"The Mother Meditation"	1:11
26.	"The Lake" (Vocal version)	4:14
27.	"Turning Time Around" (written and performed by Lou Reed)	4:23
Total length:		74:46
