= Sang-won =

- Hangul: 상원
- RR: Sangwon
- MR: Sangwŏn

Sang-won is a Korean given name.

People with this name include:

- Oh Sangwon (1930–1985), South Korean journalist
- Sang Won Park (born 1950), South Korean-born American traditional Korean musician
- Park Sang-won (born 1959), South Korean actor
- Gwon Sang-won (born 1969), South Korean swimmer
- Jang Sang-won (born 1977), South Korean football midfielder (K-League Classic)
- Back Sang-won (born 1988), South Korean baseball player (Korea Baseball Organization)
- Kim Sang-won (footballer) (born 1992), South Korean football defender (K-League Classic)
- Sang Won Kang, South Korean biologist

== See also ==
- List of Korean given names
