= Live in New York (Laurie Anderson album) =

Live at Town Hall: New York City, September 19–20, 2001

Live album by Laurie Anderson
- Released: May 21, 2002
- Recorded: September 19–20, 2001
- Venues: The Town Hall, New York City
- Genres: Avant-garde; experimental; pop
- Labels: Nonesuch; Elektra
- Producer: Laurie Anderson

Laurie Anderson chronology
Life on a String (2001)	Live at Town Hall: New York City, September 19–20, 2001 (2002)	Homeland (2010)

Professional ratings
Review scores
Source	Rating
AllMusic	3/5 stars
Rolling Stone Album Guide	4/5 stars

Live in New York is a live album by American performance artist Laurie Anderson released as a double-CD by Nonesuch Records in 2002. The album cover reads Laurie Anderson Live at Town Hall New York City September 19–20, 2001.

Recorded soon after the September 11, 2001, attacks on New York City, the album was produced during Anderson's tour of the United States featuring a mix of pieces from earlier in her career and newer works. Following so close to the attacks, Anderson makes several statements about them in her recognizable style. The performance is highlighted by a rendition of "O Superman", the song that launched Anderson to stardom in 1981, with lyrics that offered new resonance following the attacks. The song "Progress" is a retitled performance of "The Dream Before" which Anderson debuted in her 1986 short film What You Mean We? and later featured on Strange Angels.

The original release of the album included an insert with a short piece written by Anderson about the experience of performing in New York in the wake of 9/11. She also indicates that the tour was conceived as a live version of her recent Life on a String album, but her partner Lou Reed suggested she include some older works as well.

== Track listing ==
All tracks composed by Laurie Anderson; except where indicated

Disc one

1. "Here with You"
2. "Statue of Liberty"
3. "Let X=X"
4. "Sweaters"
5. "My Compensation" (Anderson, Skúli Sverrisson)
6. "Washington Street"
7. "Pieces and Parts"
8. "Strange Angels"
9. "Dark Angel"

Disc two

1. "Wildebeests"
2. "One Beautiful Evening"
3. "Poison" (Anderson, Brian Eno)
4. "Broken"
5. "Progress" (a.k.a. "The Dream Before")
6. "Animals"
7. "Life on a String"
8. "Beginning French"
9. "O Superman"
10. "Slip Away"
11. "White Lily"
12. "Puppet Motel" (Anderson, Brian Eno)
13. "Love Among the Sailors"
14. "Coolsville"

== Personnel ==
- Laurie Anderson – vocals, keyboards, violin
- Jim Black – drums, electronic percussion
- Peter Scherer – keyboards, sampling
- Skúli Sverrisson – bass, concertina

Technical

- David Bither – executive producer
- William Berger – production coordination
- Jody Elff – recording, mixing
- Adam Blackburn – recording
