= Homeland (Laurie Anderson album) =

Studio album by Laurie Anderson
- Released: June 22, 2010
- Recorded: 2007–2010
- Studio: Masterdisk (New York City)
- Genres: Avant-garde; experimental; pop
- Length: 66:00
- Label: Nonesuch
- Producers: Laurie Anderson; Lou Reed; Roma Baran

Laurie Anderson chronology
Live in New York (2002)	Homeland (2010)	Heart of a Dog (2015)

Singles from Homeland
- 1. "Only an Expert" Released: May 18, 2010

Homeland is the seventh studio album by American artist Laurie Anderson, released in 2010. A loose concept album about life in the United States, it was her first album of new material since 2001's Life on a String.

The record was produced by Anderson, Lou Reed and Roma Baran. Anderson began touring the project in late 2007. The album was originally slated for release in 2008. Because the project kept changing in form, the release was pushed back several times. The final release in 2010 was a two-disc set consisting of a CD of music and a DVD.

The song "Only an Expert" was released as a 12" vinyl single on May 18, 2010. A song titled "Pictures and Things" was the single's B-side.

The album's last track "Flow" was nominated for the Grammy Award for Best Pop Instrumental Performance in 2011.

The heavily eyebrowed, mustached character is named Fenway Bergamot.

== Critical reception ==
Professional ratings
Aggregate scores
Source	Rating
AnyDecentMusic?	7.3/10
Metacritic	82/100
Review scores
Source	Rating
AllMusic	4/5 stars
Drowned in Sound	8/10
Entertainment Weekly	B
Los Angeles Times	4/4 stars
musicOMH	5/5 stars
Pitchfork	8.3/10
PopMatters	9/10
Rolling Stone	3.5/5 stars
Slant Magazine	4/5 stars
Uncut	4/5 stars

The Wire magazine said that Homeland "reminds us why Anderson, now in her sixties, is the (modulated) voice of America's conscience."

Margaret Wappler of The Los Angeles Times wrote of the album, "'Homeland' isn't so much an album as it is a poetic capturing of the still moments of a restless mind".

== Track listing ==
All tracks are written by Laurie Anderson, except where noted.

Homeland – CD
No.	Title	Lyrics	Length
1.	"Transitory Life"		6:52
2.	"My Right Eye"		4:58
3.	"Thinking of You"		4:12
4.	"Strange Perfumes"		4:45
5.	"Only an Expert"		7:26
6.	"Falling"	Laurie Anderson; George W.S. Trow	3:20
7.	"Another Day in America"		11:24
8.	"Bodies in Motion"		7:10
9.	"Dark Time in the Revolution"		5:14
10.	"The Lake"		5:39
11.	"The Beginning of Memory"		2:45
12.	"Flow"		2:14
Total length:			65:59

Homeland – Deluxe edition
No.	Title	Length
13.	"Lost Art of Conversation"	3:50
14.	"Only an Expert" (Tech Support Glitch Mix)	3:19
Total length:		73:08

Homeland – DVD
No.	Title	Length
1.	"Homeland: The Story of the Lark"	41:00
2.	"Laurie's Violin"	7:00
Total length:		48:00

== Personnel ==
- Laurie Anderson – vocals, keyboards, percussion, violin (on tracks 3, 7, 12), radio (9)
- Peter Scherer – keyboards
- Rob Burger – keyboards (2–5, 8, 9), orchestron (2–3, 8), accordion (3, 4, 9, 10), marxophone (4)
- Eyvind Kang – viola
- Tuvan group Chirgilchin (Aidysmaa Koshkendey, Igor Koshkendey, Mongoun-Ool Ondar) – vocals (1, 11), igil (1)
- Lou Reed – additional percussion (2), guitar (5)
- Anohni – vocals (4), background vocals (7)
- Shahzad Ismaily – percussion (4)
- Kieran Hebden – keyboards (5)
- Omar Hakim – drums (5)
- Skúli Sverrisson – bass (7, 9), guitar (8)
- Ben Wittman – drums, percussion (7)
- John Zorn – alto saxophone (8, 11)
- Lolabelle – piano (8)
- Joey Baron – drums (9)
- Mario J. McNulty – percussion (11)

Technical

- Produced by Laurie Anderson with Lou Reed and Roma Baran
- Engineered by Laurie Anderson, Patrick Dillett, Mario J. McNulty and Marc Urselli
- Mixed by Mario J. McNulty
- Mastered by Scott Hull at Masterdisk, New York, NY
- Andrew Zuckerman – cover photography

DVD

- Directed by Braden King
- Produced by Katie Stern Truckstop Media

== Charts ==
Chart (2010)	Peak position
German Albums Chart	62
Greek Albums Chart	41
