= Home of the Brave (soundtrack) =

Soundtrack album from Home of the Brave by Laurie Anderson
- Released: May 26, 1986
- Recorded: 1985
- Studio: Park Theater (Union City, New Jersey)
- Genres: Avant-pop; experimental
- Length: 34:08
- Label: Warner Bros.
- Producers: Laurie Anderson; Roma Baran; Nile Rodgers

Laurie Anderson chronology
United States Live (1984)	Home of the Brave (1986)	Strange Angels (1989)

Professional ratings
Review scores
Source	Rating
AllMusic	2/5 stars
Christgau's Record Guide	A−
The New Rolling Stone Album Guide	3/5 stars

Home of the Brave is the third studio album and first soundtrack album by American avant-garde artist Laurie Anderson, released on May 26, 1986 by Warner Bros. Records. The album is a soundtrack of her concert film of the same name.

Three of the eight tracks on the album were recorded in the studio and thus differ considerably from the filmed versions. A music video for "Language Is a Virus" was produced, using the soundtrack studio recording but footage of the live performance.

Two songs on the album were remakes of earlier works: "Language Is a Virus" was originally titled "Language is a virus from outer space – William S. Burroughs" and was performed on Anderson's earlier United States Live (the soundtrack album omits the song's spoken word introduction, "Difficult Listening Hour", which had appeared on United States Live and which was also performed in the film). "Sharkey's Night" is a song from Anderson's previous studio album, Mister Heartbreak (both 1984). However this rendition is performed by Anderson herself (the original was vocalized by William S. Burroughs) as it is in the film. Burroughs' voice is heard on the track "Late Show", however. The soundtrack album omits the other live performances of songs from Mister Heartbreak that were featured in the film.

An alternate, faster-paced version of "Smoke Rings" was recorded for release as a possible single, but there is no indication it was ever issued; it can be heard during Anderson's made-for-TV short film What You Mean We? (1986).

== Track listing ==
All compositions written by Laurie Anderson.

1. "Smoke Rings" – 6:58 co-produced by Nile Rodgers
2. "White Lily" – 1:16
3. "Late Show" – 4:30
4. "Talk Normal" – 5:27
5. "Language Is a Virus" – 4:10 Produced by Nile Rodgers
6. "Radar" – 2:03
7. "Sharkey's Night" – 6:16
8. "Credit Racket" – 3:31

== Personnel ==
- Laurie Anderson – vocals on 1, 2, 4 to 7, keyboards on 1 and 3, violin on 1 and 3, Synclavier, vocoder
- Joy Askew – keyboards on 1, 7 and 8, Moog synthesizer on 4, Prophet-5 on 4, DX-7 on 4
- Adrian Belew – guitar on 3, 4, 7 and 8
- David Van Tieghem – drums on 7, percussion on 4 and 8

Additional personnel

- Dolette McDonald – vocals on 1, 4, 7
- Janice Pendarvis – vocals on 1 and 7
- Robert Sabino – keyboards on 1, Morse code on 1
- Nile Rodgers – guitar on 1 and 5, keyboards on 5, Synclavier on 5
- Jimmy Bralower – drums on 1 and 5
- William S. Burroughs – vocal sampling on 3
- Richard Landry – saxophone on 3, 4 and 7, clarinet on 4
- Robert Aaron – saxophone on 5
- Kevin Jones – Synclavier programming on 5
- Curtis King – backing vocals on 5
- Frank Simms – backing vocals on 5
- Diane Garisto – backing vocals on 5
- Tawatha Agee – backing vocals on 5
- Christopher Sawyer-Laucanno – backing vocals on 5
- Brenda White King – backing vocals on 5
- Daniel Ponce – percussion on 7
- Isidro Bobadilla – percussion on 7
- Bill Laswell – bass animals on 8

Technical

- Leanne Ungar – engineer
- Carolyn Cannon – art direction, design
- Les Fincher – cover photography

== Charts ==
Chart performance for Home of the Brave
Chart (1986)	Peak position
Australian Albums (Kent Music Report)	74
New Zealand Albums (RMNZ)	14
Swedish Albums (Sverigetopplistan)	34
Canada Top Albums/CDs (RPM)	84
US Billboard 200	145
