= Excellent Birds =

Song written by Laurie Anderson and Peter Gabriel (1984)

Song by Laurie Anderson

from the album Mister Heartbreak
- Released: 1984
- Recorded: December 1983
- Length: 3:12
- Label: Charisma
- Songwriters: Laurie Anderson; Peter Gabriel
- Producers: Laurie Anderson; Peter Gabriel

"Excellent Birds" is a song written by Laurie Anderson and Peter Gabriel. It was first included on Anderson's Mister Heartbreak album in 1984. Gabriel later reworked the song for his 1986 So album with the title "This Is the Picture (Excellent Birds)". This version was excluded from the original vinyl edition of So but appeared as the final track on the cassette and CD releases. For later editions of So, "In Your Eyes" became the last song, moving "This Is the Picture (Excellent Birds)" earlier in the track listing.

== Background ==
"This Is the Picture (Excellent Birds)"

Song by Peter Gabriel

from the album So
- Released: 1986
- Genre: Art rock
- Length: 4:25
- Label: Charisma; Virgin; Geffen
- Songwriters: Laurie Anderson; Peter Gabriel
- Producers: Peter Gabriel; Daniel Lanois

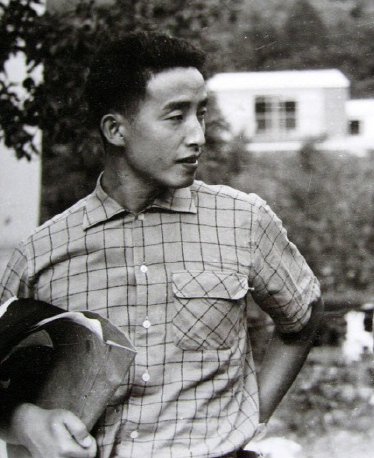
Nam June Paik (pictured) asked Anderson and Gabriel to create a song with an accompanying music video for Good Morning, Mr. Orwell.

Gabriel first encountered Anderson at her United States performance piece in spring 1983. After the performance, he approached her to discuss the possibility of collaborating on a thirty minute video that would showcase their work. In an October 1983 interview with Philip Bell of Sounds magazine, Gabriel reiterated his interest in working with Anderson on a multimedia project utilising her music, visuals, and a "comical comedian to make it a humorous piece." Bell reported that a collaboration with Gabriel, Anderson and Nile Rodgers was "imminent".

Nam June Paik, a Korean visual artist, initiated the collaboration by asking Gabriel and Anderson to contribute a song and music video for a PBS broadcast of the Good Morning, Mr. Orwell television program that would air on 1 January 1984 and reference George Orwell's Nineteen Eighty-Four.

Anderson and Gabriel were given a strict deadline to complete the song and film the music video, so the two convened at Anderson's studio where they spent "a couple of nights just working around the clock." Gabriel presented Anderson with a basic riff, which they decided to incorporate into "Excellent Birds". The two of them decided to write a song about birds since Anderson was working on a project related to natural history. After they decided on the theme, Anderson and Gabriel wrote the lyrics in a collaborative manner. Rodgers also visited the recording studio to overdub a rhythm guitar part.

Gabriel commented that he and Anderson felt like "burnt out zombies" by the end of the recording session. On the second night of tracking, Gabriel was sitting on a stool while overdubbing his vocals and fell asleep in the middle of one of his takes. When Gabriel played back the recording, he could hear some of his snores from the failed vocal attempt. The next day, Anderson and Gabriel worked on the music video. Gabriel found the filming of the music video to be more enjoyable than the recording process and noted that the project was conducted in a far more expeditious manner than what he was accustomed to. The music video capitalised on green screen visuals to provide backdrops for Anderson and Gabriel, who are shown throughout the music video gazing at projections of animated storm clouds, birds and snow. At the end of the music video, Anderson and Gabriel levitate in the air as they perform various dances.

Gabriel recalled that they both planned to include the song on their own albums. By late 1985, Gabriel had eight finished songs for So and wanted to add another to the track list. Gabriel contacted Anderson for permission to use "Excellent Birds" on the album, which she agreed to. He subsequently reworked the song to make it fit in with the rest of So. Anderson and Gabriel had previously decided to create separate versions of the song as they had different ideas over what constituted the song's bassline; Gabriel preferred one that encompassed the lower registers. Daniel Lanois and Manu Katché overdubbed a twelve-string guitar and talking drum respectively to augment the existing tracks. Katché also recorded some mallet percussion at the request of Lanois after the talking drum part had been completed.

The song is built around sparse percussive elements with minimal variation in the instrumentation. Rodgers and Bill Laswell played guitar and bass respectively on both recordings. Gabriel provided further instrumentation on the LinnDrum and Synclavier; he also overdubbed a Fairlight CMI for his reworked version on So. The chorus features call and response vocals that repeat the phrase "this is the picture", with Gabriel singing in a higher register and Anderson whispering her part in response. Gabriel described Anderson's version as "more fragmented" than his recording, which he reworked to center around the groove. He also thought that Anderson's recording more closely resembled the mix found in the music video.

== Release ==
Gabriel did not include "This Is the Picture (Excellent Birds)" on the original vinyl version of the album due to space limitations and instead placed it as the final track on the cassette and CD versions, which were able to accommodate the song. Later releases of the album, including the 2002 edition, feature "This Is the Picture (Excellent Birds)" as the eighth track on the album, placed just before "In Your Eyes".

When Gabriel was preparing his 25th anniversary edition of So, he decided to assemble snippets of demos from the original recording sessions and compile them into full songs to demonstrate the progression of their development. Since the original recording sessions for "This Is the Picture (Excellent Birds)" were completed in 48 hours, Gabriel had a limited amount of material available, but he nonetheless included a DNA version of the song on the 25th anniversary box set.

== Critical reception ==
Writing about the "Excellent Birds" recording on Anderson's Mister Heartbreak album, Kurt Loder of Rolling Stone said that "an eclectic pop consciousness" was ingrained in the song. Lennox Samuels of Dallas Morning News thought that the song demonstrated Gabriel's "funk inclinations and his rather African musical sensibility". They also earmarked "Excellent Birds" as a potential hit single. Doug Anderson of The Sydney Morning Herald described the song as "accessible", in part due to the contributions of Gabriel. Eric Harvey of Pitchfork believed that "Excellent Birds" had lyrical similarities to Anderson's work on her debut album Big Science. He also said that the song's bassline and synthesised flute sound resembled some of the instrumentation found on Gabriel's 1982 self-titled album.

In their review of the 25th anniversary edition of So, AJ Ramirez of PopMatters dismissed "This Is the Picture (Excellent Birds)" as the only dud on the album and thought that the vocalists' "excellent birds" exclamations were "goofy". Annie Zaleski of Ultimate Classic Rock wrote that the song "boast[ed] a glassy art-funk underbelly and feathery Laurie Anderson vocal contributions." Writing for Uncut, John Lewis characterised "This Is the Picture (Excellent Birds)" as a series of "jerky abstractions in search of a song" that felt out of place on So.

== Live performances ==
Anderson began performing "Excellent Birds" live in 1984, during which blurred images were projected on a screen behind Anderson and her backing band. The television screen projected an image of a distorted woman looking out into the audience as digital snow and various text commands appeared on the screen, including "picture this", "look out", and "you pick up the pieces". Anderson included a performance of the song in her 1986 concert film Home of the Brave.

Gabriel performed "This is the Picture (Excellent Birds)" on his This Way Up Tour, which began on 7 November 1986 to promote his So album. During the tour, Manu Katché used a Dynachord Rhythm Stick on the song to trigger various percussion samples and David Sancious played a portable remote keyboard. Gabriel would preface the song by providing introductions of the band, starting with David Rhodes and ending with Tony Levin. In this extended introduction, Gabriel would announce himself as "the man who paid off all the judges before the show began." A recording from this tour was included on Gabriel's Live in Athens 1987 album. Anderson joined Gabriel onstage during his performance in New York City.

Gabriel revived the song for his 2012–2014 Back to Front Tour, which saw Gabriel play the entirety of his So album from start to finish. The song was later included on Back to Front: Live in London, which was recorded at The O2 Arena in October 2013.

== Personnel ==
"Excellent Birds"

- Laurie Anderson – vocals, Synclavier
- Peter Gabriel – vocals, Synclavier, LinnDrum
- Bill Laswell – bass guitar
- Nile Rodgers – guitar

"This Is the Picture (Excellent Birds)"

- Laurie Anderson – vocals
- Peter Gabriel – vocals, Synclavier, LinnDrum, Fairlight CMI
- Bill Laswell – bass guitar
- Nile Rodgers – guitar
- Daniel Lanois – twelve-string guitar
- Manu Katché – talking drum

== Sources ==
- Bright, Spencer (1988). Peter Gabriel: An Authorized Biography. London, UK: Sidgwick & Jackson. ISBN 0-283-99498-3.
- Classic Albums: So. Classic Albums. United Kingdom: Eagle Rock Entertainment and Peter Gabriel Records Ltd. 22 October 2012.
- Bowman, Durrell (2 September 2016). Experiencing Peter Gabriel: A Listener's Companion. Lanham, MD: Rowman & Littlefield. ISBN 978-1-44225-199-1.
- Easlea, Daryl (2013). Without Frontiers: The Life & Music of Peter Gabriel. London: Omnibus Press. ISBN 978-1780383156.
- Gallo, Armando (1986). Peter Gabriel. United Kingdom: SonicBond. ISBN 0-7119-0783-8.
- Scarfe, Graeme (2021). Peter Gabriel: Every Album, Every Song. United Kingdom: SonicBond. ISBN 978-1-78952-138-2.
