= Home of the Brave (1986 film) =

- Directed by: Laurie Anderson
- Produced by: Paula Mazur
- Starring: Laurie Anderson; Adrian Belew; William S. Burroughs
- Cinematography: John Lindley
- Edited by: Lisa Day
- Music by: Laurie Anderson; Peter Gabriel (song "Excellent Birds")
- Distributed by: Cinecom Pictures
- Release date: April 25, 1986
- Running time: 90 minutes
- Country: United States
- Language: English
- Box office: $1,250,000

Home of the Brave is a 1986 American concert film directed by and featuring the music of Laurie Anderson. The film's full on-screen title is Home of the Brave: A Film by Laurie Anderson. The performances were filmed at the Park Theater in Union City, New Jersey, during the summer of 1985.

== Background ==
The film included appearances by guitarist Adrian Belew, author William S. Burroughs, keyboardist Joy Askew, and percussionist David Van Tieghem. Barry Sonnenfeld, who was early in his movie-making career, receives an early film credit for operating second projection camera on this film. The film was released by Cinecom Pictures, but it was commercially unsuccessful.

A soundtrack album was released concurrently with the film, which contained studio versions of some songs from the film and live versions of others.

The film was briefly available on VHS and Laserdisc in the early 1990s from Warner Reprise Video. In 2007, Anderson announced on her official website that the film would be released on DVD as part of a video box set. The announcement was later removed and as of 2022 there has yet to be a DVD or Blu-ray release of the film though it is available on The Criterion Channel November 2026.

Musical selections included songs taken from Anderson's 1984 album Mister Heartbreak (the film was shot during a tour in support of the album) and a couple of selections from her United States multimedia show of 1983, and several original pieces. Warner Bros. requested that Anderson create a single-friendly release from the soundtrack, so she recorded a faster-tempo, dance-mix version of the song "Smoke Rings". Ultimately, this recording was not released; however, it can be heard during the All-Night Diner sequence of her short film What You Mean We? Instead, a version of "Language is a Virus" that differs from the film performance was recorded and produced by Nile Rodgers, released a single, and a music video was released using footage from the film but the studio recording of the song; it received wide airplay.

The first vocal song performed by Anderson in the film is "Excellent Birds", a collaboration with Peter Gabriel from Mister Heartbreak. Although Gabriel does not appear in this film, and the song is not performed as a duet, Home of the Brave was released a few months after a second version with Anderson was released as "This Is the Picture (Excellent Birds)" on Gabriel's album So.

Gabriel also originally provided background vocals on "Gravity's Angel" from Mister Heartbreak. Guitarist Adrian Belew sings the part more prominently in the film version.

== Soundtrack ==
The following pieces are performed in the film:

1. Good Evening (instrumental)
2. Zero and One (spoken word)
3. Excellent Birds
4. Old Hat (spoken word)
5. Drum Dance (instrumental)
6. Smoke Rings
7. Late Show (instrumental with vocal sample by William S. Burroughs)
8. White Lily (spoken word)
9. Sharkey's Day
10. How to Write (instrumental with spoken word introduction by Sang Won Park and featuring Van Tieghem and Belew)
11. Kokoku
12. Radar (instrumental with wordless vocalizations by Anderson)
13. Gravity's Angel
14. Langue d'amour (partially sung in French)
15. Talk Normal
16. Difficult Listening Hour (spoken word)
17. Language Is a Virus
18. Sharkey's Night
19. Credit Racket (instrumental)

Only "Late Show", "White Lily", "Radar", and "Sharkey's Night" appear on the soundtrack album as they are performed in the film. Studio versions of "Smoke Rings", "Language Is a Virus", and "Talk Normal" are used on the album, as is "Credit Racket", which is also a studio track that is played over the closing credits in the film. None of the other performances in this film have to date been released in audio format.

In addition to the above, William S. Burroughs also performs two brief excerpts from "Sharkey's Night", the song he performs on Anderson's album Mr. Heartbreak. In the film, Anderson performs the complete song herself at the end of the movie. Following "Talk Normal" is an untitled spoken-word sequence with Anderson and Askew having an awkward on-stage telephone conversation. Several times during the film (most notably "Good Evening", "Difficult Listening Hour", "Sharkey's Night"), Anderson digitally modulates her voice to make it sound male; this is an effect she employed in United States and would return to later on projects such as the film What You Mean We, her 1986 performance on Saturday Night Live, her introductions to the TV series Alive from Off Center and her CD-ROM release, Puppet Motel.

== See also ==
- Big Time - 1988 Tom Waits concert film
- Stop Making Sense
