= Live at Town Hall =

Live at Town Hall may refer to:

- Live at Town Hall, a 1967 album by The Blues Project
- Live in New York (Laurie Anderson album), 2002, also known as Laurie Anderson Live at Town Hall New York City September 19–20, 2001
- Eels with Strings: Live at Town Hall, a 2006 album by Eels
- Live at the Town Hall, a 2008 video album by Ocean Colour Scene
- Live at Town Hall (Klezmatics album), 2011
