= Good Morning, Mr. Orwell =

1984 artwork by Nam June Paik

Pop singer Sapho performs "TV Is Eating up Your Brain", with video effects. In the lower left is a still image of George Orwell.

Merce Cunningham dances with satellite-delayed images of himself, overlaid with crawling text about George Orwell's time in Spain. In the background, Ástor Piazzolla plays the bandoneón.

"Good Morning, Mr. Orwell" was the first international satellite "installation" by Nam June Paik, a South Korean-born American artist often credited with inventing video art. It occurred on New Year's Day, 1984.

The event, which Paik saw as a rebuttal to George Orwell's dystopian vision of 1984, linked WNET TV in New York and the Centre Pompidou in Paris live via satellite, as well as hooking up with broadcasters in Germany and South Korea. It aired nationwide in the US on public television, and reached an audience of over 25 million viewers worldwide.

George Plimpton hosted the show, which combined live and taped segments with TV graphics designed by Paik. John Cage, in New York, produced music by stroking the needles of dried cactus plants with a feather, accompanied by video images from Paris. Charlotte Moorman recreated Paik's TV Cello. Laurie Anderson and Peter Gabriel performed a new composition, "Excellent Birds" (later released on Anderson's album Mister Heartbreak and Gabriel's So, retitled "This Is the Picture (Excellent Birds)" on the latter). The broadcast also featured the television premiere of the video Act III, by Dean Winkler and John Sanborn with music by Philip Glass. The Thompson Twins performed their song "Hold Me Now." Oingo Boingo played its song "Wake Up (It's 1984)" to an audience that presumably had recently woken up on the first day of 1984. Others contributing to the project included musician Arthur Russell, poets Allen Ginsberg and Peter Orlovsky, choreographer Merce Cunningham, and artist Joseph Beuys.

The program was conceived and coordinated by Nam June Paik. Executive producers was Carol Brandenburg, while the producer was Samuel J. Paul. The director was Emile Ardolino.

Technical problems plagued the show from the beginning. Different versions of the show were seen in the U.S. and France because the satellite connection between the two countries kept cutting out, leaving each side to improvise to fill the gaps. At one point, a performer in New York attempted a "space yodel"; the host explained that his voice would be bounced back and forth over the satellite link to produce an echo, but no echoes were actually heard. Paik said that the technical problems only enhanced the "live" mood.

An edited 30-minute version of "Good Morning, Mr. Orwell" has appeared in a number of exhibitions, including In Memoriam: Nam June Paik at the Museum of Modern Art. A New York Times art critic described this work: "Figures turn into bold outlines or silhouettes, surrounded by shifting geometric shapes. Edges become soft, then hard. Images overlap. Some take on new configurations. Seven screens repeat the same pictures simultaneously. Although the viewer doesn't know what to expect, the celebrities are real, the film lends credibility and therefore all seems plausible."

Paik followed up the piece in 1986 with "Bye Bye Kipling", a satellite installation linking New York, Seoul, and Tokyo. The title alluded to a famous quotation by Rudyard Kipling: "East is East, and West is West, and never the twain shall meet."
