= Sang Won Park =

South Korean musician (born 1950)

Sang Won Park (Korean: 박상원; born 1950) is a South Korean musician. He plays the kayagum and ajaeng, and sings in both traditional Korean and free improvisational styles.

He was born in Seoul, South Korea. He began his musical studies at the age of ten and later studied traditional instruments, voice, dance, and Western music at the National Conservatory in Seoul and at Seoul National University, earning B.A. and M.A. degrees in musicology. He was also a member of the Traditional Music Orchestra of Seoul and a researcher at the Academy of Korean Studies, as well as an instructor at various music schools in Seoul.

Park relocated to the United States around 1980, moving to New York City. He made his Western debut in Carnegie Recital Hall in 1979 and soon began performing and pre-recording in non-traditional settings, collaborating with Henry Kaiser, Laurie Anderson, Ryuichi Sakamoto, Jason Kao Hwang, and the Far East Side Band. His trio with Henry Kaiser and Charles K. Noyes, called Invite the Spirit, was formed in the summer of 1983 and was probably the first free improvisation ensemble to integrate a Korean traditional musician. The Far East Side Band is a multicultural music group with members from Chinese, Korean, Japanese, and African American backgrounds. He has toured North America and Europe and has also worked with Bill Laswell and Joseph Celli.

He was also featured in Derek Bailey's Improvisation television series on the UK's Channel 4, as well as films by Laurie Anderson and Nam June Paik.

For many years, Park has earned his living primarily from operating two flower shops in New York City. He has a forthcoming album on the Water Lily Acoustics label.

== Discography ==
=== Solo ===
- Le Kayagum de Park Sang-Won (Les Amis d'Orient/Sono Disc ESP 165528)

=== With Laurie Anderson ===
- 1984 - Laurie Anderson: Mister Heartbreak (on track 4)

=== With Henry Kaiser and Charles K. Noyes ===
- 1984 - Invite the Spirit

=== With Ryuichi Sakamoto ===
- 1989 - Beauty

== Films ==
- 1986 - Home of the Brave: A Film by Laurie Anderson
- c. 1990 - Improvisation (Channel 4)
- 1986 - Bye Bye Kipling (satellite spectacular produced by Nam June Paik on public television)

== Radio programs ==
- Old Traditions, New Sounds (public radio documentary)

== See also ==
- Gayageum
- Korean music
