= Hsin-Chien Huang =

Taiwanese artist and director

- Born: 13 January 1966 (age 60); Taipei
- Education: Bachelor of mechanical engineering NTU; Bachelor of Science of Product Design ACCD; Master of design IIT
- Known for: VR, Digital Art
- Notable work: La Camera Insabbiata(2017), Bodyless(2019), Samsara(2021)
- Awards: [Best VR Experience Award] - 74th Venice International Film Festival [Honorary Mention] - 2020 Prix Ars Electronica [Golden Mask] - 2020 Newimages Festival [Jury Award] - 2021 Texas SXSW Festival [Conceptual Design - Gaming, AR & VR (NEW)] - 2022 Muse Design Awards [Best VR Short Film] - 2023 Animest Romania International Animation Festival [Creator of the Year Award] - 2023 XRMust XR Awards

Hsin-Chien Huang (Chinese: 黃心健, born 13 January 1966) is an artist and director working in mixed media. Science, technology, new media, programming, and algorithms are tools he uses to bring the universe of his imagination to life. He served as artistic director for SEGA and Sony. Huang collaborated with pioneering American media artist Laurie Anderson on their VR work La Camera Insabbiata/Chalkroom which won the Best VR experience Award at the 74th Venice International Film Festival(it was the first edition of the festival that introduced its virtual-reality section); he also designed her 1995 CD-ROM, Puppet Motel. His work Bodyless was also nominated in the 76th of the festival. In 2011，Huang received the "Pride of Taiwan" honor from president of Taiwan Ma Ying-jeou.

He founded Storynest Studio after 2001, which engaged in artistic creation and commercial design. Huang is currently a distinguished professor at National Taiwan Normal University.

His VR film Samsara won the 2021 SXSW Jury Award.

== Early life ==
At the age of four, the cornea of Hsin-Chien Huang's right eye was damaged so badly he was practically blind in that eye, his vision only returning after receiving a donated cornea at age 14. He lacked depth perception in the interim, so seeing things "properly" has since felt like a luxury to him.

Huang's mother is the eminent oil painter, Lee Lan. Raised in an artistic environment, Huang was given his first computer, an Apple II, when he was in senior high school. Since that time, programming language has become his second language.

After graduating from college in Taiwan with a degree in mechanical engineering, he went on to earn a bachelor's degree in product design from the Art Center College of Design in Pasadena, followed by a master's degree from the Institute of Design at Chicago's Illinois Institute of Technology.

== Artwork ==
Year	Title
2022	VR: The Eye and I
2021	VR: Samsara
2020	Through the Body
2019	VR: Bodyless
2019	VR: Kuo Hsueh-Hu: Three States of Home Gazing
2019	VR: The Universe of Liu Kuo-Sung
2018	VR: To the Moon
2017	VR: La Camera Insabbiata
2017	VR: Aloft
2017	Window of Heaven and Earth, Mirror of the Travelers
2013	The Moment We Meet

== Exhibitions ==
- 2024 - 'Living in the (Un)real: An Immersive Journey between Art and Surveillance' at MEET Cultural Digital Center, Milan, Italy
- 2022 - 'Hsin-Chien Huang: The Data We Called Home' at Pratt Gallery - New York, the States
- 2022 - 'Being X: Hsin-Chien Huang's Metaverse Theater' at Kaohsiung Museum of Fine Arts - Kaohsiung, Taiwan
- 2021 - "Un portal a la memoría" at L.E.V. Festival, Gijón, Spain
- 2020 - "Out of the window" International Exhibition Produced by Taoyuan Museum of Fine Arts & Centraal Museum Utrecht - Taoyuan, Taiwan
- 2020 - "In the name of tree" Art Museum of National Taiwan Normal University - Taipei, Taiwan
- 2020 - "RE:Human Touch- A Closer Future" Taiwan Creative Content Agency - Taipei, Taiwan
- 2019 - "Immersive Interactive Unit" International Documentary Filmfestival Amsterdam - Amsterdam, Netherlands
- 2019 - "Vortex Program" Laboratorio de Electrónica Visual L.E.V. Festival - Madrid, Spain
- 2019 - "Every step in the right direction" Singapore Art Museum - Singapore, Singapore
- 2019 - "Our Moon. Longing, Art and Science" Naturhistorisches Museum Wien - Vienna, Austria
- 2017 - "La Camera Insabbiata/Chalkroom" Taipei Fine Arts Museum - Taipei, Taiwan
- 2014 - "Thus have I remembered, once my mind was free" Cathay Gallery - Taipei, Taiwan
- 2008 - "The art of mortal apparatus" Taipei Fine Arts Museum - Taipei, Taiwan

== Collaboration ==
- 2010 Taipei International Flora Exposition: Hall Design (2019)
- Expo 2010 Shanghai China: Interactive Device (2010)
- Incomparable concert Jay Chou: Audio Visual Design (2004)
- Puppet Motel: Designer of the music/art CD-ROM by Laurie Anderson (1995)

== Awards ==
Year	Event	Award	Work	Status
2023	FilmGate Miami Interactive Media Festival	Best of Fest Award	The Eye and I	Won
2023	XRMust XR Awards	Creator of the Year Award	The Eye and I	Won
2023	Animest Romania International Animation Festival	Best VR Short Film	Samsara	Won
2022	Muse Design Awards 2022	Conceptual Design - Gaming, AR & VR (NEW)	Dance of Light	Won
2022	VR AWARDS 2022	VR Film of the Year	Samsara	Nominated
2022	Bolton International Film Festival	VR Competition	Samsara	Nominated
2022	SIGGRAPH 2022	VR Competition	Samsara	Nominated
2022	Ottawa International Animation Festival	Best Virtual Reality	Samsara	Nominated
2022	Prix Ars Electronica	Computer Animation Honorary Mention	Samsara	Won
2022	Annecy International Animated Film Festival	VR Competition	Samsara	Nominated
2022	Animafest Zagreb	VR Competition: the Best VR Project	Samsara	Won
2022	International Festival of Animated Films ANIFILM	International Competition of VR Films	Samsara	Nominated
2022	Laval Virtual Awards	VR/AR for Entertainment & Medias	Samsara	Nominated
2021	Jeddah Red Sea International Film Festival (RedSeaIFF)	Sliver Yusr Immersive Award	Samsara	Won
2021	Geneva International Film Festival (GIFF)	Future IS SENSIBLE Award	Samsara	Nominated
2021	VRE VIRTUAL REALITY EXPERIENCE -EXTENDED EDITION (3rd Edition)	Special Jury Prize	Samsara	Won
2021	Festival of International Virtual & Augmented Reality Stories (FIVARS)	Best Interactive Experience	Samsara	Won
2021	Venice International Film Festival	VR Expanded Section	Samsara	Nominated
2021	Cannes XR	Best VR Story	Samsara	Won
2021	The 5th Indian World Film Festival (India)	Short Animation	Bodyless	Won
2021	Texas SXSW Festival (Texas)	Jury Award	Samsara	Won
2020	Los Angeles Film Award (Los Angeles)	Best Virtual Reality	Bodyless	Won
2020	Asian Academy Creative Awards (Singapore)	Best Immersive(360, VR)	Kuo Hsueh-Hu: Three States of Home Gazing	Won
2020	Newimages Festival (Paris)	Golden Mask	Bodyless	Won
2020	Prix Ars Electronica (Austria)	Honorary Mention	Bodyless	Won
2019	Kaohsiung Film Festival (Kaoshsiung)	Special Mention	Bodyless	Won
2019	The 76th Venice International Film Fextival	Interactive	Bodyless	Nominated
2017	The 74th Venice International Film Festival	Best VR Experience Award	La Camera Insabbiata	Won
2013	Public Art Award (Taipei)	Art Creation Price	The Moment We Meet	Won

== Publications ==
- Huang Hsin-Chien's XR Insights 2022. ISBN 9786269519491
- The Color Devourer 2016. ISBN 9789574741458
- Technology Mirage 2013. ISBN 9862134224
- Pictographic Labyrinth 2003. ISBN 9789574113088
