= What You Mean We? =

1987 film by Laurie Anderson

- Directed by: Laurie Anderson
- Written by: Laurie Anderson
- Starring: Laurie Anderson
- Narrated by: Spalding Gray
- Release date: September 6, 1986
- Running time: 23 minutes
- Country: United States
- Language: English

What You Mean We? is a 1986 American made-for-television musical short film starring the performance artist Laurie Anderson, who also wrote and directed the piece.

== Overview ==
Originally produced as a segment of the PBS arts series Alive from Off Center, the film runs a little less than a half-hour and is broken into several segments.

Following an excerpt from her 1986 concert movie, Home of the Brave (a performance of the instrumental "Late Show," which also features William S. Burroughs), the film begins with Anderson being interviewed on a faux talk show; the interviewer's voice is provided by Spalding Gray, talking about how her popularity and workload has become too much for one person to handle. So, after speaking to some scientists, she has cloned herself. The Clone is introduced: due to some complications in the process, however, the Clone is only about half the size of Anderson, and has distinctive male characteristics (like a mustache) and an electronically distorted voice. Anderson plays a dual role as the Clone, and the voice distortion she uses is the same as that which she often used in her early 1980s performances when she wished to affect a male persona on stage (which eventually was named Fenway Bergamot). After a few moments, Anderson begs out of the interview claiming to be late for a photo session, leaving the Clone to carry the interview as the opening credits roll.

After the credits, the scene shifts to Laurie's apartment where the Clone is shaving in the bathroom, ranting about an idea he has for the ultimate Rambo/Rocky sequel that would involve Sylvester Stallone playing both roles in a fight to the finish that would end both series. Afterward, the Clone joins Laurie in the living room and starts work on a song, lighting cigarette after cigarette. Laurie, however, would rather read a newspaper and complain about the Clone smoking too much. At one point Laurie says, "You know we have to get this done by the benefit tonight." "What you mean, we?" the Clone replies sullenly.

The first musical number in the film is an early version—performed by the Clone—of a song titled "The Dream Before" (a.k.a. "Hansel and Gretel are Alive and Well"), which would later be recorded for Anderson's album Strange Angels.

After this sequence, the film shifts to an all-night diner where an incompetent chef is shown causing havoc in a kitchen while making breakfast and singing along to a fast dance mix of the song "Smoke Rings" from Anderson's then-recent concert film Home of the Brave. (To date, this recording has never been released.)

After several additional surreal sequences, the film ends with the Clone being interviewed (again by Gray) and talking about how the workload in his career is too much for one person and that he has also had to resort to cloning to share the burden. Once again there were complications and the Clone's clone is revealed to be a large, electronically distorted version of Laurie Anderson wearing clown-like make-up. As the Clone leaves the interview, leaving his clone to carry on, the film ends.

A year after making this film, Anderson (and her Clone) returned to host the 1987 season of Alive from Off Center. Although this film has yet to be rereleased in its entirety to home video, segments such as "The Dream Before" and "Smoke Rings" were included on the compilation Laurie Anderson: Collected Videos. Anderson would later return to the experiment of creating an alter ego with her CD-ROM release Puppet Motel, which replaced the clone with a ventriloquist dummy.

Anderson and Spalding Gray collaborated again in 1987 when she provided the soundtrack music to his performance film Swimming to Cambodia.
