= Sang Won Kang =

South Korean academic

- Occupation: Professor of proteomics
- Employer: Ewha Womans University

Korean name
- Hangul: 강상원
- Hanja: 姜相元
- RR: Gang Sangwon
- MR: Kang Sangwŏn

Sang Won Kang is a South Korean expert in proteomics. He is a professor of life science at the Ewha Womans University whose numerous peer-reviewed articles have appeared in such journals as Journal of Biological Chemistry and the Journal of the American Society of Nephrology with the highest one being cited over 1,000 times.
