= Alive from Off Center =

Television series

- Also known as: Alive TV
- Presented by: Susan Stamberg (1985-1986); Laurie Anderson (1987); Ann Magnuson (1988); William Wegman (1988)
- Country of origin: United States
- Original language: English
- No. of seasons: 12

Production
- Running time: 28 minutes
- Production company: KTCA-TV

Original release
- Network: PBS
- Release: 1985 – 1996

Alive from Off Center, renamed Alive TV in 1992, is an American arts anthology television series that aired on PBS between 1985 and 1996.

Each week, the series featured experimental short films by a mixture of up-and-coming and established directors. Notable episodes included "As Seen on TV," starring comic actor Bill Irwin as an auditioning dancer who becomes trapped in a television, wandering among daytime dramas, MTV, and PBS's own Sesame Street and the atmospheric puppet melodrama "Street of Crocodiles," adapted by the Brothers Quay from the Bruno Schulz story.

Other installments included "Dances in Exile" directed by Howard Silver, a recorded dance piece with text by David Henry Hwang and choreography by Ruby Shang and another directed by Jonathan Demme.

One episode that aired November 30, 1985, entitled "The World of Photography" featured photographers Michael Smith and William Wegman in a parody how-to instructional video about photography using various skits. The episode was written by John Schott and directed by Mark Fischer.

Another series episode was What You Mean We? a short film written by, directed by, and starring Laurie Anderson, which aired in 1986. Anderson later came back to host the 1987 season of the series, assisted by the Clone (who was eventually renamed Fenway Bergamot with a slightly different body shape), a masculine version of Anderson created by digitally altering her image and obscuring her voice that had been introduced in What You Mean We? Most episodes of the 1987 season opened with a brief skit by Anderson and the clone by way of introducing that week's piece.

Actress Ann Magnuson subsequently co-hosted the 1988 season, after which the series had no regular hosts.
