= Laurie Anderson =

American artist and musician (born 1947)

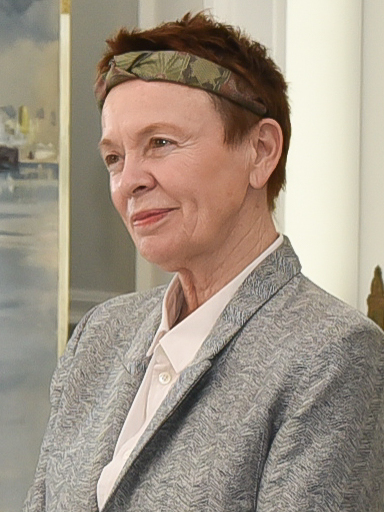
- Anderson in 2020

Background information
- Born: Laura Phillips Anderson; June 5, 1947 (age 79); Chicago, Illinois, U.S.
- Origin: Glen Ellyn, Illinois, U.S.
- Genres: Art pop; electronic; avant-garde; spoken word
- Occupations: Musician; composer; performance artist; electronic literature writer
- Instruments: Violin; keyboards; percussion; vocals
- Years active: 1969–present
- Labels: Warner Bros.; Nonesuch
- Spouse: Lou Reed (m. 2008; died 2013)
- Website: laurieanderson.com

Laura Phillips "Laurie" Anderson (born June 5, 1947) is an American avant-garde artist, musician and filmmaker whose work encompasses performance art, pop music, and multimedia projects. Initially trained in violin and sculpting, Anderson pursued a variety of performance art projects in New York City during the 1970s, focusing particularly on language, technology, and visual imagery. She achieved unexpected commercial success when her song "O Superman" reached number two on the UK singles chart in 1981.

Anderson's debut studio album Big Science was released in 1982 and has since been followed by a number of studio and live albums. She starred in and directed the 1986 concert film Home of the Brave. Anderson's creative output has also included theatrical and documentary works, voice acting, art installations, and a CD-ROM. She is a pioneer in electronic music and has invented several musical devices that she has used in her recordings and performance art shows.

== Early life and education ==
Laura Phillips Anderson was born in Chicago on June 5, 1947, and grew up in the nearby suburb Glen Ellyn, Illinois, one of eight children born to Mary Louise (née Rowland) and Arthur T. Anderson. Growing up, she spent weekends studying painting at the Art Institute of Chicago and played with the Chicago Youth Symphony Orchestras.

She graduated from Glenbard West High School. She attended Mills College in California, and, after moving to New York in 1966, graduated in 1969 from Barnard College with a B.A. magna cum laude and Phi Beta Kappa, studying art history. In 1972, she obtained an M.F.A. in sculpture from Columbia University.

Her first performance-art piece — a symphony played on automobile horns — was performed in 1969. In 1970 she drew the underground comix Baloney Moccasins, which was published by George DiCaprio. In the early 1970s she worked as an art instructor and as an art critic for magazines such as Artforum, and illustrated children's books — the first of which was The Package (1971), a mystery story in pictures alone.

== Career ==
=== 1970s ===
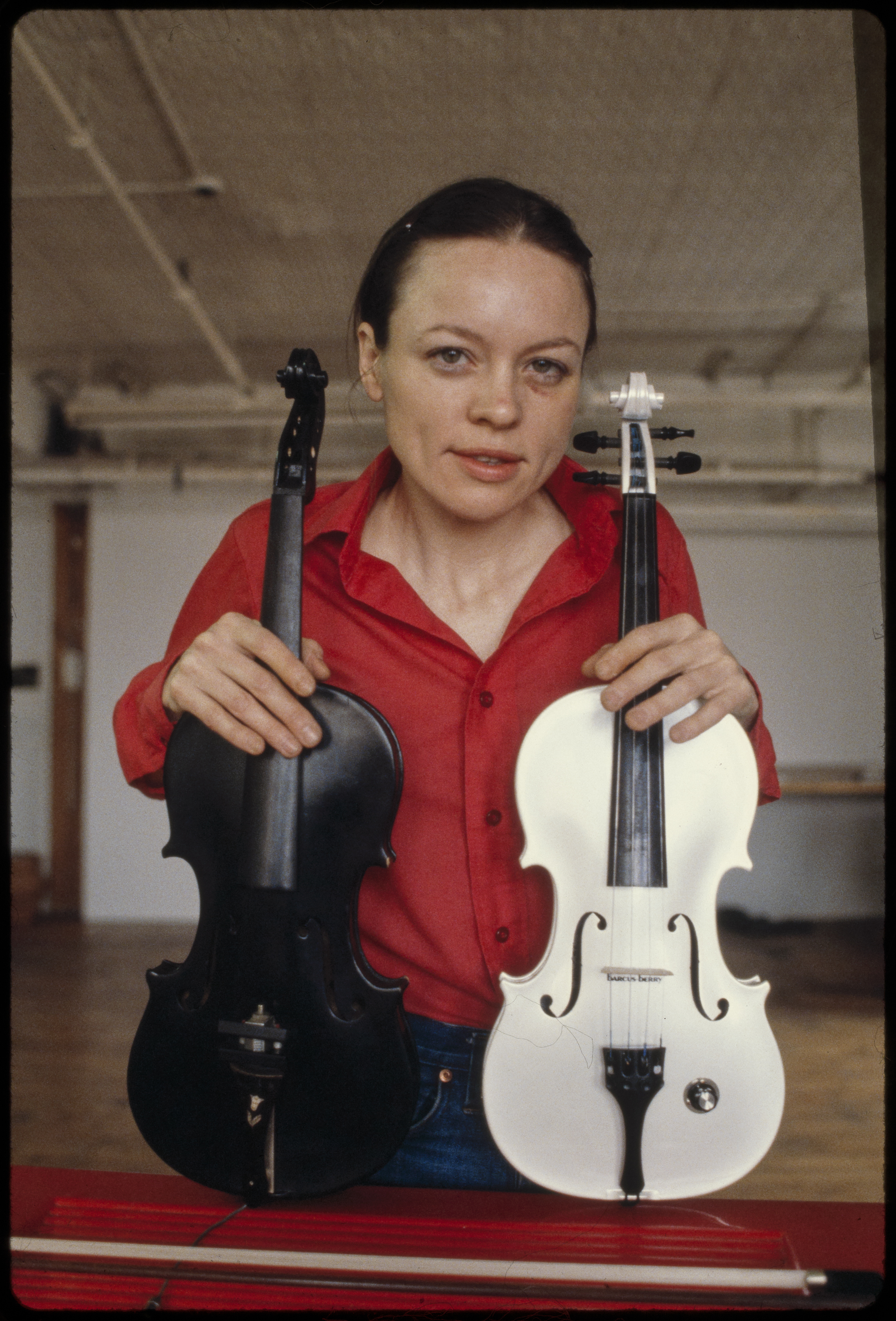
Photograph of Anderson in the Library of Congress, Washington, D.C.

Anderson performed in New York during the 1970s. One of her most-cited performances, Duets on Ice, which she conducted in New York and other cities around the world, involved her playing the violin along with a recording while wearing ice skates with the blades frozen into a block of ice; the performance ended only when the ice had melted away. Two early pieces, "New York Social Life" and "Time to Go", are included in the 1977 compilation New Music for Electronic and Recorded Media, along with works by Pauline Oliveros and others. Two other pieces were included on Airwaves, a collection of audio pieces by various artists. She also recorded a lecture for Vision, a set of artist's lectures released by Crown Point Press as a set of six LPs.

Many of Anderson's earliest recordings remain unreleased or were issued only in limited quantities, such as her first single, "It's Not the Bullet that Kills You (It's the Hole)". That song, along with "New York Social Life" and about a dozen others, was originally recorded for use in an art installation that consisted of a jukebox that played the different Anderson compositions, at the Holly Solomon Gallery in New York City. Among the musicians on these early recordings are Peter Gordon on saxophone, Scott Johnson on guitar, Ken Deifik on harmonica, and Joe Kos on drums. Photographs and descriptions of many of these early performances were included in Anderson's retrospective book Stories from the Nerve Bible (1993).

During the late 1970s, Anderson made a number of additional recordings that were either released privately or included on compilations of avant-garde music, most notably releases by the Giorno Poetry Systems label run by New York poet John Giorno, an early intimate of Andy Warhol. In 1977, she was granted an artist-in-residence stay at the Cité internationale des Arts in Paris, France. In 1978, she performed at the Nova Convention, a major conference involving many counter-culture figures and rising avant-garde musical stars, including William S. Burroughs, Philip Glass, Frank Zappa, Timothy Leary, Malcolm Goldstein, John Cage, and Allen Ginsberg. She also worked with comedian Andy Kaufman in the late 1970s.

=== 1980s ===
In 1980, Anderson was awarded an honorary doctorate from the San Francisco Art Institute. In 1982, she was awarded a Guggenheim Fellowship for Creative Arts — Film. In 1987, Anderson was awarded an honorary doctorate in the fine arts from the University of the Arts in Philadelphia.

Anderson became widely known outside the art world in 1981 with the single "O Superman", originally released in 1980, in a limited quantity by B. George's One Ten Records, which ultimately reached number two on the UK singles chart. The sudden influx of orders from the UK (prompted partly by British station BBC Radio 1 playlisting the record) led to Anderson signing a seven-album recording contract with Warner Bros. Records, which re-released the single.

"O Superman" was part of a larger stage work, United States Live (1984), and was included on her debut studio album, Big Science (1982). Before the release of Big Science, Anderson returned to Giorno Poetry Systems to record the collaboration album You're the Guy I Want to Share My Money With (1981); she recorded one side of the double-LP set, William S. Burroughs and John Giorno recorded a side each, and the fourth side featured a separate groove for each artist. This was followed by the back-to-back releases of her albums Mister Heartbreak and United States Live (both 1984), the latter of which was a five-LP (and, later, four-CD) recording of her two-evening stage show at the Brooklyn Academy of Music. She also appeared in "Good Morning, Mr. Orwell", a TV special produced by Nam June Paik broadcast on New Year's Day 1984.

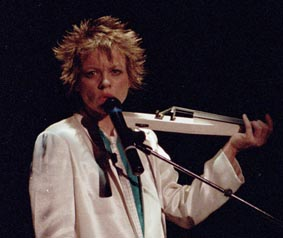
Anderson performing at De Vereeniging in Nijmegen, Netherlands, 1986

Anderson next starred in and directed the 1986 concert film Home of the Brave and also composed the soundtracks for the Spalding Gray films Swimming to Cambodia (1987) and Monster in a Box (1992). During this time, she also contributed music to Robert Wilson's Alcestis at the American Repertory Theater in Cambridge, Massachusetts. In 1987, she hosted the PBS series Alive from Off Center, after having produced the short film What You Mean We? for the series the year before. What You Mean We? introduced a new character played by Anderson: "The Clone", a digitally altered masculine counterpart to Anderson who "co-hosted" with her on Alive from Off Center. Elements of the Clone were later incorporated into the titular puppet of her later work Puppet Motel. In that year, she also appeared on Peter Gabriel's fifth studio album So, co-writing and performing on the song "Excellent Birds". (The first version of "Excellent Birds" had been released on Mister Heartbreak.)

Release of Anderson's first post-Home of the Brave album, 1989's Strange Angels, was delayed for more than a year in order for Anderson to take singing lessons. The album had more singing than her previous work. The single "Babydoll" was a moderate hit on the Modern Rock Tracks chart in 1989.

=== 1990s ===
In 1991, Anderson was a member of the jury at the 41st Berlin International Film Festival. Also in 1991, she appeared in The Human Face, a feature arts documentary directed by artist-filmmakers Nichola Bruce and Michael Coulson for BBC Television. Anderson was the presenter in this documentary on the history of the face in art and science. Her face was transformed using latex masks and digital special effects as she introduced ideas about the relationship between physiognomy and perception. Her varied career in the early 1990s included voice-acting in the animated film The Rugrats Movie (1998). In 1994, she created a CD-ROM titled Puppet Motel, which was followed by Bright Red, co-produced by Brian Eno, and another spoken-word album, The Ugly One with the Jewels (1995). This was followed by an appearance on the 1997 charity single "Perfect Day".

In 1996, Anderson performed with Diego Frenkel (La Portuária) and Aterciopelados for the AIDS benefit album Silencio=Muerte: Red Hot + Latin produced by the Red Hot Organization.

An interval of more than half a decade followed before her next album release. During this time, she wrote a supplemental article on the cultural character of New York City for the Encyclopædia Britannica and created multimedia presentations, including one inspired by Moby-Dick (Songs and Stories from Moby Dick, 1999–2000). One of the central themes in Anderson's work is the effects of technology on human relationships and communication.

Starting in the 1990s, Anderson and Lou Reed, whom she had met in 1992, collaborated on recordings together. Reed contributed to the tracks "In Our Sleep" from Anderson's Bright Red (1994), "One Beautiful Evening" from Anderson's Life on a String (2001), and "My Right Eye" and "Only an Expert" from Anderson's Homeland (2010), which Reed also co-produced. Anderson contributed to the tracks "Call on Me" from Reed's collaborative project The Raven (2003), "Rouge" and "Rock Minuet" from Reed's Ecstasy (2000), and "Hang On to Your Emotions" from Reed's Set the Twilight Reeling (1996).

In late 1998, Artist Space, New York presented an exhibit of Anderson’s work from 1970s to 1980s, along with her 1990s work Whirlwind.

=== 2000s ===
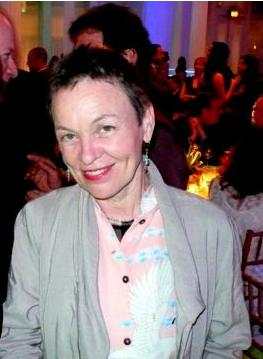
Anderson at a 2007 benefit concert

Life on a String appeared in 2001, by which time she signed a new recording contract with another Warner Music Group label, Nonesuch Records. Life on a String was a mixture of new works (including one song recalling the death of her father) and works from the Moby-Dick presentation. In 2001, she recorded the audiobook version of Don DeLillo's novella The Body Artist. Anderson went on tour performing a selection of her best-known musical pieces in 2001. One of these performances was recorded in New York City a week after the September 11 attacks, and included a performance of "O Superman". This concert was released in early 2002 as the double CD Live in New York.

In 2003, Anderson produced albums with French musicians La Jarry and Hector Zazou and also performed with them. Zazou's album Strong Currents (2003), which brought together well-known soloists, features her alongside Jane Birkin, Lori Carson and Irene Grandi, among others. She became NASA's first artist-in-residence in the same year, which inspired her performance piece The End of the Moon. In May 2004, she received an honorary doctorate from Columbia University. She was part of the team that created the opening ceremony for the 2004 Summer Olympics in Athens and collaborated with choreographer Trisha Brown and filmmaker Agnieszka Wojtowicz-Vosloo on the multimedia project O Zlozony/O Composite for the Paris Opera Ballet which premiered at the Palais Garnier in Paris in December 2004. She mounted a succession of themed shows and composed a piece for Expo 2005 in Japan. In 2005, Anderson visited Russia's space program — the Gagarin Cosmonaut Training Centre and mission control — with the Arts Catalyst and took part in the Arts Catalyst's Space Soon event at the Roundhouse to reflect on her experiences.

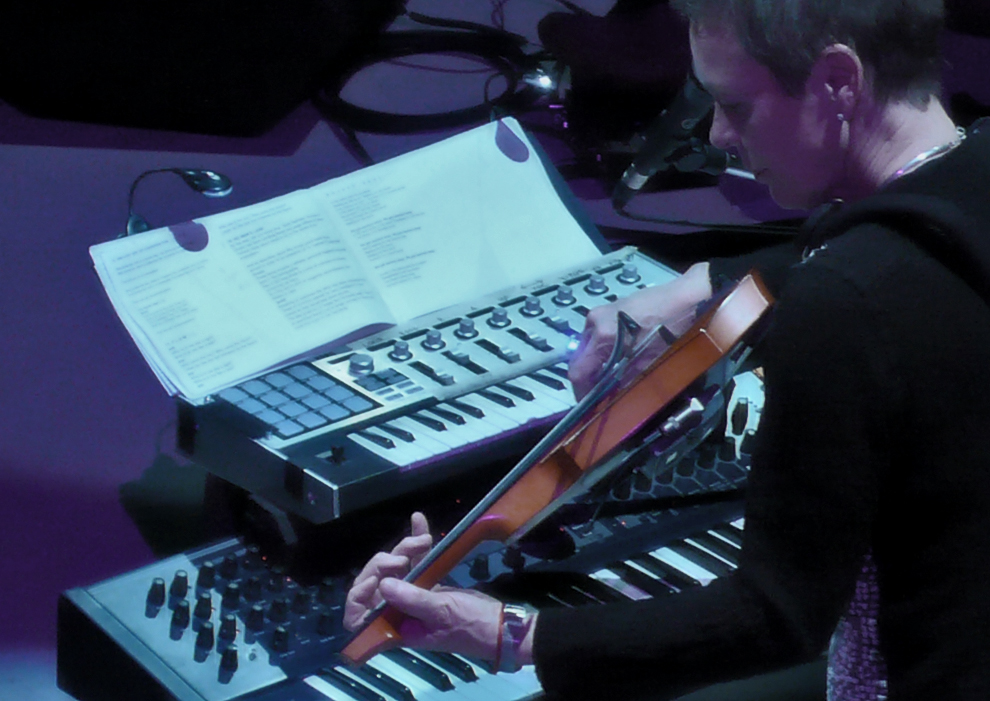
Anderson performing Homeland in Milan, Italy, 2007

In 2005, her exhibition The Waters Reglitterized opened at the Sean Kelly Gallery in New York City. According to the press release by Sean Kelly, the work is a diary of dreams and their literal recreation as works of art. This work uses the language of dreams to investigate the dream itself. The resulting pieces include drawings, prints, and high-definition video. The installation ran until October 22, 2005.

In 2006, Anderson was awarded a Residency at the American Academy in Rome. She narrated Ric Burns' Andy Warhol: A Documentary Film, which was first televised in September 2006 as part of the PBS American Masters series. She contributed a song to Plague Songs, a collection of songs related to the 10 Biblical plagues. Anderson also performed in Came So Far for Beauty, the Leonard Cohen tribute event held at the Point Theatre in Dublin, Ireland, on October 4–5, 2006. In November 2006, she published a book of drawings based on her dreams, titled Night Life.

Material from Homeland was performed at small work-in-progress shows in New York throughout May 2007 supported by a four-piece band with lighting and video visuals mixed live by Willie Williams and Mark Coniglio, respectively. A European tour of the Homeland work in progress included performances on September 28–29, 2007, at the Olympia Theatre, Dublin; on October 17–19 at the Melbourne International Arts Festival; and in Russia at the Moscow Dom Muzyky concert hall on April 26, 2008. The work was performed in Toronto, Canada, on June 14, 2008, with husband Lou Reed, making the "Lost Art of Conversation" a duet with vocals and guitar. Anderson's Homeland Tour performed at several locations across the United States as well, such as at the Ferst Center for the Arts, Atlanta, Georgia; The Lincoln Center for the Performing Arts, New York City; and Harris Theater for Music and Dance in Millennium Park, Chicago, Illinois, co-presented by the Museum of Contemporary Art Chicago.

=== 2010s ===
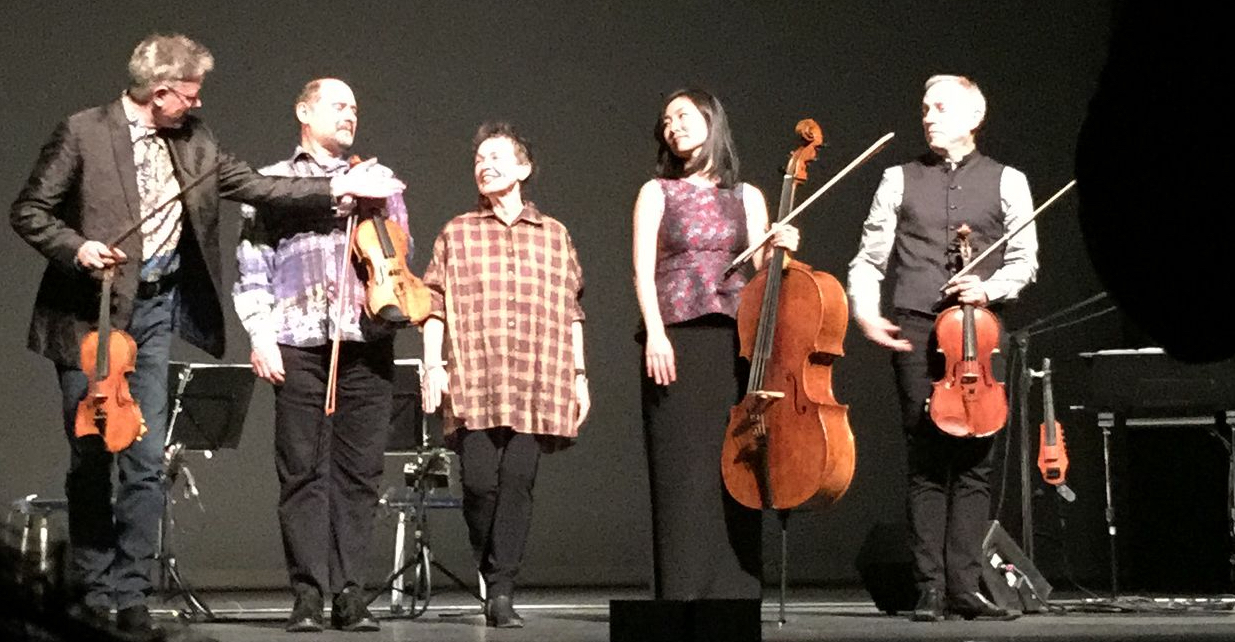
Anderson with the Kronos Quartet, after performing Landfall at the Harris Theater in Chicago, 2015

In February 2010, Anderson premiered a new theatrical work, Delusion, at the 2010 Winter Olympics in Vancouver, Canada. This piece was commissioned by the Vancouver 2010 Cultural Olympiad and the Barbican Centre, London. Anderson was honored with the Women's Project Theater Woman of Achievement Award in March 2010. In May–June 2010, she and Reed curated the Vivid Live festival in Sydney. Her new studio album Homeland was released on June 22. She performed "Only an Expert" on July 15, 2010, on the Late Show with David Letterman, and her song "Gravity's Angel" was featured on the Fox reality television dance competition show So You Think You Can Dance the same day. She appears as a guest musician on several tracks from experimental jazz musician Colin Stetson's studio album New History Warfare Vol. 2: Judges (2011).

Anderson developed a theatrical work, "Another Day in America". The first public showings of this work-in-progress took place in Calgary in January 2012 as part of Theatre Junction Grand's 2011–12 season and One Yellow Rabbit's annual arts festival, the High Performance Rodeo. Anderson was named the Inaugural Distinguished Artist-In-Residence at the Experimental Media and Performing Arts Center (EMPAC) at the Rensselaer Polytechnic Institute in Troy, New York, in May 2012. In March 2013, an exhibition of Anderson's work entitled Laurie Anderson: Language of the Future, selected works 1971–2013 at the Samstag Museum was part of the Adelaide Festival of the Arts in Adelaide, South Australia. Anderson performed her Duets on Ice outside the Samstag on opening night.

Anderson received the Honorary Doctor of Arts from the Aalto University School of Arts, Design and Architecture in 2013. In June/July 2013, Anderson performed "The Language of the Future" and guest curated at the River to River Festival in New York City. In November 2013, she was the featured Guest of Honor at the B3 Biennale of the Moving Image in Frankfurt, Germany. In 2018, Anderson contributed vocals to a re-recording of the David Bowie song "Shining Star (Makin' My Love)", originally from Bowie's seventeenth studio album Never Let Me Down (1987). She was asked to join the production by producer Mario J. McNulty, who knew that Anderson and Bowie had been friends.

On February 10, 2019, at the 61st Annual Grammy Awards in Los Angeles, Anderson and the Kronos Quartet's Landfall won the Grammy Award for Best Chamber Music/Small Ensemble Performance. It was Anderson's first collaboration with the Kronos Quartet and her first Grammy Award, and the second for Kronos. The piece was inspired by her experience of Hurricane Sandy. Nonesuch Records said, "Landfall juxtaposes lush electronics and traditional strings by Kronos with Anderson's powerful descriptions of loss, from water-logged pianos to disappearing animal species to Dutch karaoke bars."

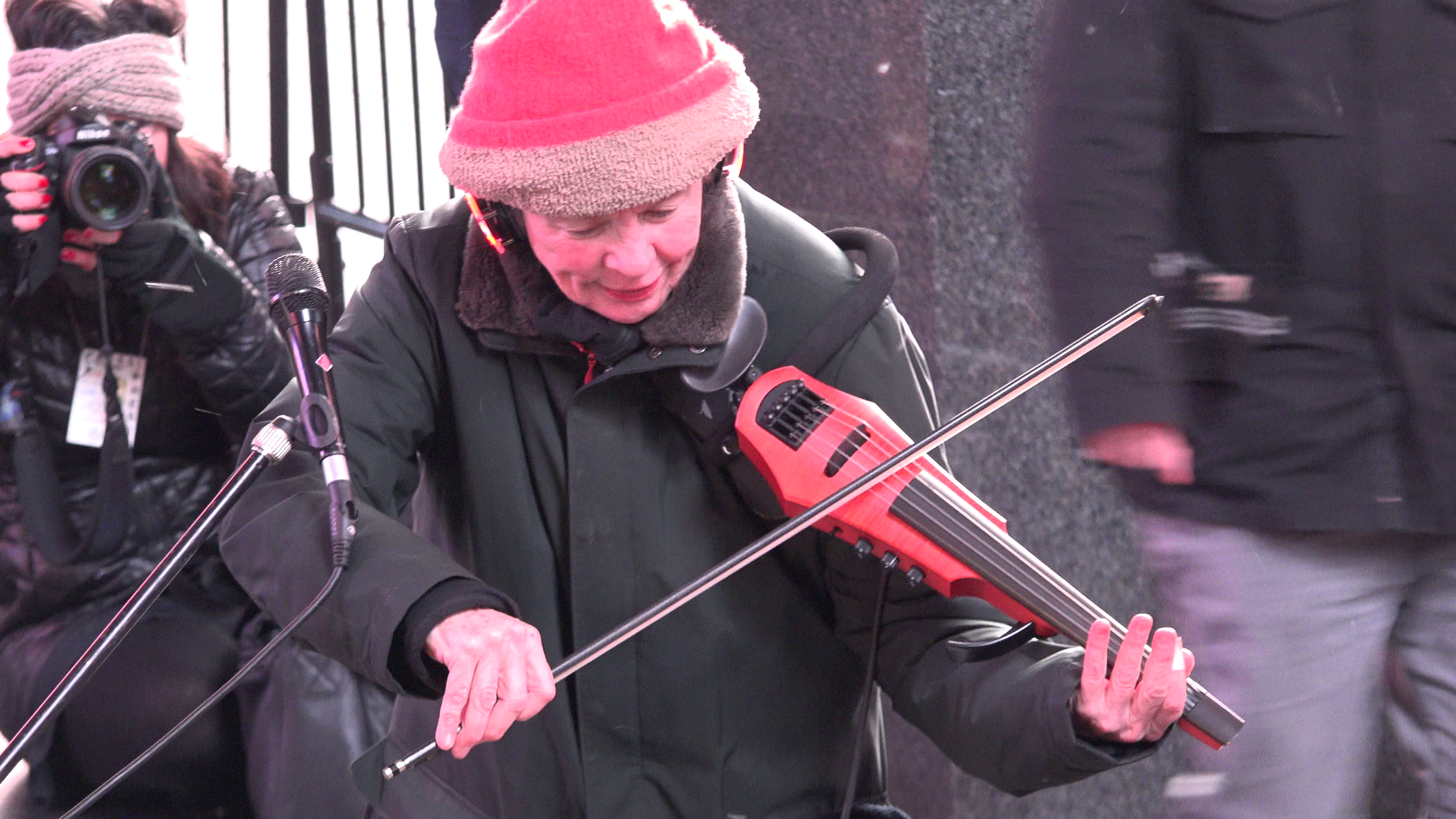
Anderson performing outdoors at Times Square in New York City, 2016

Chalkroom is a virtual reality work by Anderson and Taiwanese artist Hsin-Chien Huang in which the reader flies through an enormous structure made of words, drawings, and stories. To the Moon, a collaboration with Hsin-Chien Huang, premiered at the Manchester International Festival on July 12, 2019. A 15-minute virtual reality artwork, To the Moon lets audience members explore a moon that features donkey rides and rubbish from Earth in a non-narrative structure. Alongside, a film shows the development of the new work.

=== 2020s ===
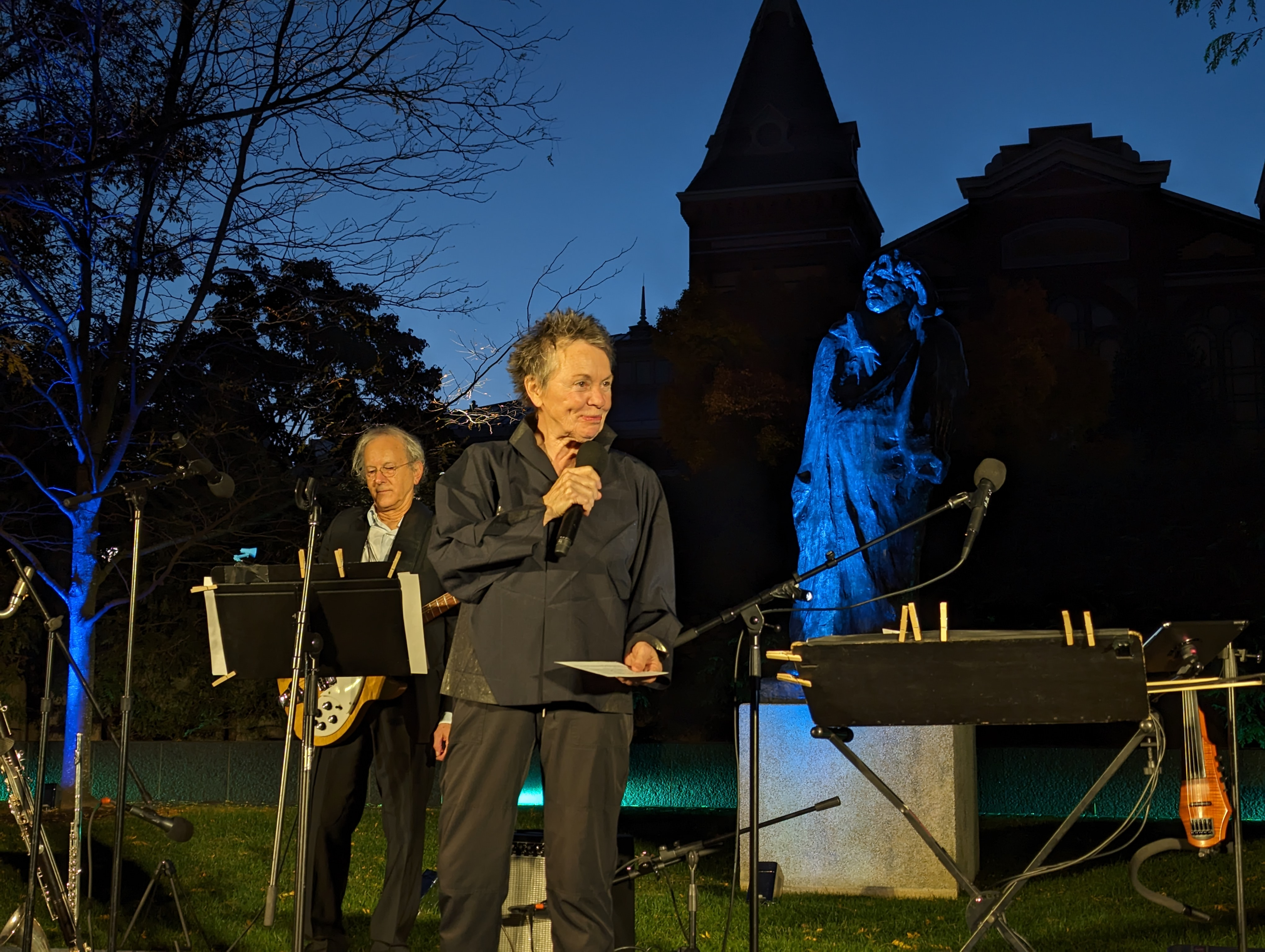
Anderson performing with Doug Wieselman at the Hirshhorn Museum and Sculpture Garden in Washington, D.C., 2023

Anderson was appointed the 2021 Charles Eliot Norton Professor of Poetry at Harvard University and presented a series of six lectures titled Spending the War Without You: Virtual Backgrounds over two semesters.

In 2021, Anderson created a show on the second floor of the Hirshhorn Museum and Sculpture Garden in Washington, D.C., titled "The Weather" and described by The New York Times as "a sort of nonretrospective retrospective of one of America's major, and majorly confounding, modern artists".

In mid-2023, Laurie Anderson created "Looking into a Mirror Sideways", an exhibit that highlights various different styles of her art techniques. It opened at the Moderna Museet in Stockholm, Sweden. Since opening, this artwork has been Anderson's biggest solo show in Europe.

While in Europe, Anderson teamed up with Sexmob, a New York jazz band. Sexmob and Anderson toured Europe where they performed multiple versions of her songs, but adding a twist to them all. This tour was seen as "an attempt at defying gravity, resisting the pull, [and] reverting the downward fall".

In 2024, Anderson withdrew from a guest professorship at the Folkwang University of the Arts in Essen, Germany, after university officials objected to her support of a "Letter Against Apartheid" organised by Palestinian artists, calling for "an immediate and unconditional cessation of Israeli violence against Palestinians".

In November 2024 Anderson staged United States V, a multimedia performance envisioned as a sequel to United States. The work was commissioned by Factory International and staged at their Aviva Studios venue in Manchester, England. It featured video appearances from Ai Weiwei as God and Anohni as an angel.

She is a foreign member of the Royal Swedish Academy of Music.

== Inventions ==
Anderson has invented several experimental musical instruments that she has used in her recordings and performances. In 1977, she created a tape-bow violin that uses recorded magnetic tape on the bow instead of horsehair and a magnetic tape head in the bridge. In the late 1990s, she collaborated with Interval Research to develop an instrument she called a "talking stick", a six-foot-long (1.8 m) baton-like MIDI controller that can access and replicate sounds.

=== Tape-bow violin ===
The tape-bow violin is an instrument created by Laurie Anderson in 1977. It uses recorded magnetic tape in place of the traditional horsehair in the bow, and a magnetic tape head in the bridge. Anderson has updated and modified this device over the years. She can be seen using a later generation of this device in her film Home of the Brave during the Late Show segment in which she manipulates a sentence recorded by William S. Burroughs. This version of the violin used MIDI-based audio samples, triggered by contact with the bow.

=== Talking stick ===
The talking stick is a six-foot-long baton-like MIDI controller. It was used in the Moby-Dick tour in 1999–2000. She described it in program notes as follows:

The Talking Stick is a new instrument that I designed in collaboration with a team from Interval Research and Bob Bielecki. It is a wireless instrument that can access and replicate any sound. It works on the principle of granular synthesis. This is the technique of breaking sound into tiny segments, called grains, and then playing them back in different ways. The computer rearranges the sound fragments into continuous strings or random clusters that are played back in overlapping sequences to create new textures. The grains are very short, a few hundredths of a second. Granular synthesis can sound smooth or choppy depending on the size of the grain and the rate at which they're played. The grains are like film frames. If you slow them down enough, you begin to hear them separately.

=== Voice filters ===
A recurring motif in Anderson's work is the use of an electric pitch-shifting voice filter that deepens her voice into a masculine register, a technique that Anderson has referred to as "audio drag". Anderson has long used the resulting character in her work as a "voice of authority" or conscience, although she later decided that the voice had lost much of its authority and instead began using the voice to provide historical or sociopolitical commentary, as it is used on "Another Day in America", a piece from her seventh studio album Homeland (2010).

For much of Anderson's career, the voice was nameless or called the Voice of Authority, although as early as 2009 it was dubbed Fenway Bergamot at Lou Reed's suggestion. The cover of Homeland depicts Anderson in character as Bergamot, with streaks of black makeup to give her a moustache and thick, masculine eyebrows.

In "The Cultural Ambassador", a piece on her second live album The Ugly One with the Jewels (1995), Anderson explained some of her perspective on the character:

(Anderson:) I was carrying a lot of electronics so I had to keep unpacking everything and plugging it in and demonstrating how it all worked, and I guess I did seem a little fishy — a lot of this stuff wakes up displaying LED program readouts that have names like Atom Smasher, and so it took a while to convince them that they weren't some kind of portable espionage system. So I've done quite a few of these sort of impromptu new music concerts for small groups of detectives and customs agents and I'd have to keep setting all this stuff up and they'd listen for a while and they'd say: So um, what's this? And I'd pull out something like
(Bergamot:) this filter, and say, now this is what I like to think of as the voice of authority. And it would take me a while to tell them how I used it for songs that were, you know, about various forms of control, and they would say, now why would you want to talk like that? And I'd look around at the SWAT teams, and the undercover agents, and the dogs, and the radio in the corner, tuned to the Super Bowl coverage of the war. And I'd say, take a wild guess.

== Personal life ==
Anderson moved to New York in 1966 and later moved to Tribeca. She met musician and songwriter Lou Reed in 1992, and was married to him from April 2008 until his death in 2013.

In October 2012, Hurricane Sandy destroyed archives documenting decades of Anderson's creative work, including photographs, performance props, audiovisual equipment, musical instruments, and other materials. This loss became the impetus for her book All the Things I Lost in the Flood (2018), where she reflects on her career and the ephemeral nature of art. Anderson's album Landfall was also inspired by Hurricane Sandy and won the Grammy Award for Best Chamber Music/Small Ensemble Performance in 2019.

Anderson is a long-time student of Buddhism and meditation. She first learned meditation on a retreat with the Insight Meditation Society in 1977. She has since become a student of Tibetan Nepali teacher Yongey Mingyur Rinpoche.

== Discography ==
=== Studio albums ===
Album and details	Peak positions									
Album and details	US	AUS	CAN	GER	GRE	NLD	NZ	SWE	SWI	UK
Big Science: Released: 1982; Label: Warner Bros.	124	–	–	–	–	–	8	–	–	29
Mister Heartbreak: Released: 1984; Label: Warner Bros.	60	–	41	–	–	23	12	46	19	93
Home of the Brave: Released: 1986; Label: Warner Bros.	145	74	84	–	–	–	14	34	–	–
Strange Angels: Released: 1989; Label: Warner Bros.	171	–	–	–	–	–	–	–	–	–
Bright Red: Released: 1994; Label: Warner Bros.	195	–	–	–	–	–	–	–	–	
Life on a String: Released: 2001; Label: Nonesuch	–	–	–	84	–	–	–	–	–	–
Homeland: Released: 2010; Label: Nonesuch	–	–	–	62	41	–	–	–	–	–
Amelia: Released: 2024; Label: Nonesuch	–	–	–	–	–	–	–	–	41	–

=== Spoken word albums ===
- The Ugly One with the Jewels (1995)
- Heart of a Dog (Soundtrack) (2015) (US Soundtracks #18)

=== Live albums ===
- United States Live (boxed set) (1984) US No. 192
- Live in New York (2002)
- Let X=X (with Sexmob) (2026)

=== Compilation albums ===
- Talk Normal: The Laurie Anderson Anthology (2000)

=== Audio book ===
- The Body Artist by Don DeLillo (2001)

=== Collaborations ===
- Airwaves (1977 – One Ten Records); various artists compilation including three tracks by Anderson
- You're the Guy I Want to Share My Money With with William S. Burroughs and John Giorno (1981 – Giorno Poetry Systems)
- "This Is the Picture (Excellent Birds)" with Peter Gabriel (1986, So – Geffen / Charisma)
- "Design for Living", with Nona Hendryx (1983), Nona, also with Gina Schock of the Go-Go's, Valerie Simpson of Ashford & Simpson, Tina Weymouth of Tom Tom Club and Talking Heads, Nancy Wilson of Heart, and former bandmate Patti LaBelle
- "Diva" from Zoolook by Jean-Michel Jarre (1984 – Disques Dreyfus)
- "Tightrope" and "Speak My Language" (1993; Faraway, So Close! Soundtrack – SBK Records / ERG)
- A Chance Operation: The John Cage Tribute with text by John Cage (1993 – Koch International Classics)
- "Enquanto Isso" with Marisa Monte (1994, Verde, anil, amarelo, cor de rosa e carvão – EMI-Odeon) (1994, Rose and Charcoal – Blue Note Records)
- "Una hoja, una raiz (One Leaf, One Root)" with Diego Frenkel (La Portuária) and Aterciopelados (1996, Silencio=Muerte: Red Hot + Latin – H.O.L.A)
- "Je me souviens" by Jean Michel Jarre (2000, Métamorphoses – Sony Music)
- "Gentle Breeze" with Lou Reed (2004, Mary Had a Little Amp – a preschool education benefit CD – Epic)
- "The Fifth Plague (the Death of Livestock)" (2006, Plague Songs – 4AD)
- The Stone: Issue Three with John Zorn and Lou Reed (2008 – Tzadik)
- "The Electrician" (2009, Music Inspired by the Film Scott Walker: 30 Century Man – Lakeshore)
- Femina by John Zorn (2009 – Tzadik)
- New History Warfare Vol. 2: Judges by Colin Stetson (2011 – Constellation)
- "Rely on Me" with Jean Michel Jarre (2015, Electronica 1: The Time Machine – Columbia)
- Landfall (2018) (with Kronos Quartet) (US Classical Albums #1, BE #146, NL #186, PT #36)
- Songs from the Bardo (2019) (with Tenzin Choegyal and Jesse Paris Smith) (US New Age Albums #1; US Independent Albums #50)
- The Great Lakes Suite (2025), with Rheostatics

=== Singles ===
- "O Superman" (1981) No. 28 AUS; No. 2 UK; BE (Vl) No. 19; IRL No. 11; NL No. 10; NZ No. 21
- "Big Science" (1981)
- "Sharkey's Day" (1984)
- "Language Is a Virus" (1986) No. 96 AUS;
- "Strange Angels" (1989)
- "Babydoll" (1989) No. 7 US Modern Rock Tracks
- "Beautiful Red Dress" (1990)
- "In Our Sleep" (1994)
- "Big Science 2" (2007)
- "Mambo and Bling" (2008)
- "Only an Expert" (2010)

The single "Sharkey's Day" was for many years the theme song of basic cable channel Lifetime. Anderson also recorded a number of limited-release singles in the late 1970s (many issued from the Holly Soloman Gallery), songs from which were included on a number of compilations, including Giorno Poetry Systems' The Nova Convention and You're the Guy I Want to Share My Money With. Over the years she has performed on recordings by other musicians such as Peter Gabriel, Lou Reed, and Jean-Michel Jarre. She also contributed lyrics to the Philip Glass album Songs from Liquid Days, and contributed a spoken-word piece to a tribute album in honor of John Cage.

== Music videos ==
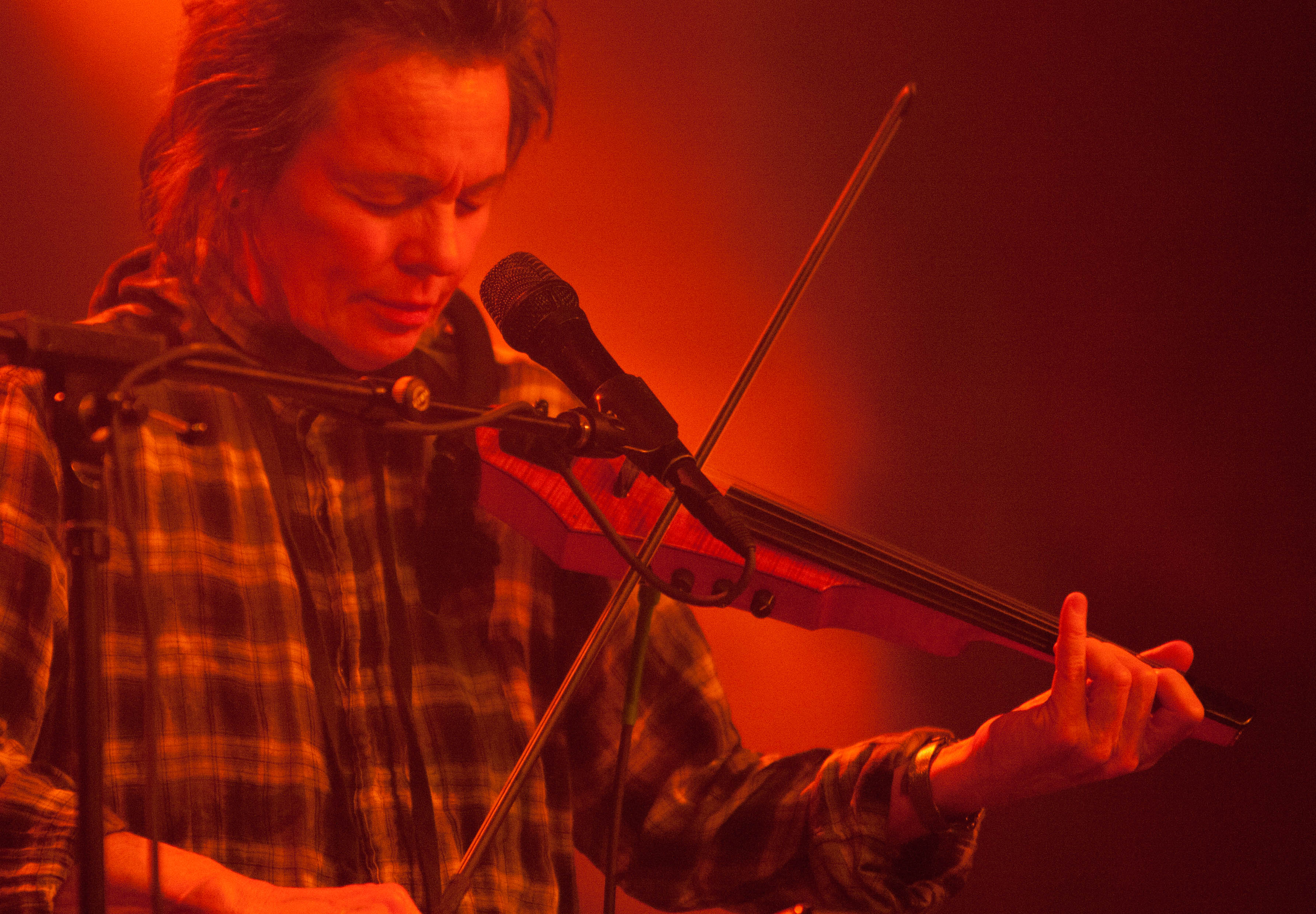
Anderson performing at Donaufestival in Krems an der Donau, Austria, 2012

Formal music videos have been produced for:

- "O Superman"
- "Sharkey's Day"
- "This Is the Picture (Excellent Birds)"
- "Language Is a Virus" (from Home of the Brave)
- "Beautiful Red Dress"

In addition, in lieu of making another music video for her Strange Angels album, Anderson taped a series of one- to two-minute "Personal Service Announcements" in which she spoke about issues such as the U.S. government debt and the arts scene. Some of the music used in these productions came from her soundtrack of Swimming to Cambodia. The PSAs were frequently shown between music videos on VH1 in early 1990.

== Films ==
- Dearreader: How to Turn a Book into a Movie – 1974
- Closed Circuit – 1983
- Home of the Brave: A Film by Laurie Anderson – 1986
- What You Mean We? – 1987
- Hotel Deutschland – 1992
- The Rugrats Movie – 1998 (as a character voice)
- Laurie Anderson: On Performance: ART/new york No. 54 – 2001
- Life on a String – 2002
- Hidden Inside Mountains – 2006
- Heart of a Dog – (2015)
- Feminists: What Were They Thinking? – (2018)
- Sisters with Transistors – (2020) – narrator

== Digital media ==
- Puppet Motel (Macintosh CD-ROM, 1995) – collaboration with Hsin-Chien Huang.

== Legacy ==
In 2013, Dale Eisinger of Complex ranked United States as the third greatest work of performance art ever, with the writer arguing that Anderson is "able to ascertain just exactly the climate of life in the United States, without being so punctuated that it causes a standoff. Perhaps the zenith of this configuration was her multimedia performance, 'United States I – IV.' [...] [Anderson displays] her vast, incisive range of talents on the 'United States Live' recordings."

== Awards and nominations ==
Award	Year	Nominee(s)	Category	Result	Ref.
Adelaide Film Festival	2015	Heart of a Dog	Best Documentary	Won	
Chicago International Film Festival	2015	Heart of a Dog	Best Documentary	Won	
Cinema Eye Honors Awards	2016	Heart of a Dog	Outstanding Achievement in Original Music Score	Won	
Cinema Eye Honors Awards	2016	Heart of a Dog	Outstanding Achievement in Direction	Nominated	
Cinema Eye Honors Awards	2016	Heart of a Dog	Outstanding Achievement in Graphic Design or Animation	Nominated	
Deutsche Schallplatten Prize	2001	Life on a String	Deutsche Schallplatten Prize	Won	
Film Independent Spirit Awards	2016	Heart of a Dog	Best Documentary Feature	Nominated	
Edison Awards	1983	Big Science	Extra International	Won	
Grammy Awards	1985	"Gravity's Angel"	Best Instrumental Arrangement Accompanying Vocal(s)	Nominated	
Grammy Awards	1991	Strange Angels	Best Alternative Music Performance	Nominated	
Grammy Awards	2011	"Flow"	Best Pop Instrumental Performance	Nominated	
Grammy Awards	2019	"Landfall"	Best Chamber Music/Small Ensemble Performance	Won	
Grammy Awards	2021	Songs from the Bardo	Best New Age Album	Nominated	
Grammy Awards	2024	Words & Music, May 1965 – Deluxe Edition	Best Historical Album	Nominated	
Gotham Awards	2015	Heart of a Dog	Best Documentary	Nominated	
Gotham Awards	2015	Heart of a Dog	Audience Award	Nominated	
La Roche-sur-Yon International Film Festival	2015	Heart of a Dog	Prix Nouvelles Vagues Acuitis	Nominated	
Locarno International Film Festival	2005	Hidden Inside Mountains	Golden Leopard – Video	Nominated	
Locarno International Film Festival	2015	Herself	Lifetime Achievement Award	Won	
Locarno International Film Festival	2022	Herself	Vision Award Ticinomoda	Won	
New York Music Awards	2011	Herself	Best Alternative Female Vocalist	Won	
Charles Eliot Norton Lectures	2021–2022	Herself	Charles Eliot Norton Professorship of Poetry at Harvard University	awarded	
Tenco Prize	2001	Herself	Tenco Prize for Songwriting	Won	
Tribeca Film Festival	2006	Hidden Inside Mountains	Best Narrative Short	Nominated	
Tromsø International Film Festival	2016	Heart of a Dog	Aurora Award	Won	
Venice Film Festival	2015	Heart of a Dog	Lina Mangiacapre Award	Won	
Venice Film Festival	2015	Heart of a Dog	Golden Lion	Nominated	
Venice Film Festival	2015	Heart of a Dog	Green Drop Award	Nominated	
Wolf Prize	2017	Herself	Award for Art	Won	

== Television ==
- Bei Bio – musical guest on German TV show, 1984
- The New Show – musical guest, 1984
- Saturday Night Live – musical guest, 1986
- Alive from Off Center – host, 1987
- Space Ghost Coast to Coast – guest 1996
- Late Show with David Letterman – guest 2010
- PBS Newshour – guest October 4, 2024

== Audiobooks ==
- The Path to Tranquility by His Holiness the Dalai Lama – co-narrator, 1999
- The Body Artist by Don DeLillo – sole narrator, 2001
- Nothing in My Pockets – two-part sound diary recorded in 2003, orig. 2006 French radio broadcast, booklet with text and photography (Dis Voir, 2009) ISBN 978-2-914563-43-7 (also published in French)

== Bibliography ==
- United States (HarperCollins, 1984) ISBN 0-06-091110-7
- Empty Places (A Performance) (Harper Perennial, 1991) ISBN 978-0-06-096586-0
- Stories from the Nerve Bible: A Twenty-Year Retrospective (HarperCollins, 1994) ISBN 0-06-055355-3
- Dal vivo (Fondazione Prada, 1999) ISBN 88-87029-10-5
- Night Life (Edition 7L, 2007) ISBN 3-86521-339-1
- All the Things I Lost in the Flood (Rizzoli Electa, 2018) ISBN 0-8478-6055-8
