= Puppet Motel =

1995 video game

- Publisher: The Voyager Company
- Designer: Hsin-Chien Huang
- Writer: Laurie Anderson
- Platform: Macintosh
- Release: 1995

Puppet Motel is a 1995 interactive music CD-ROM developed by The Voyager Company and released for the Macintosh. Written by and featuring American artist Laurie Anderson and designed by Hsin-Chien Huang, it is a mixture of video, audio and digital art, featuring performances from Anderson and interactive rooms where players can listen, view, and manipulate multimedia. Puppet Motel contained music from Anderson's 1994 album Bright Red, and closely interacted with her 1995 tour Nerve Bible, where the disc was sold by the publisher as a companion piece to the performance.

Upon release, the software received positive reviews, with critics praising its interactivity and Hsin-Chien's evocation of Anderson's body of creative work, although some found the non-linear and avant-garde nature of the work less accessible for a general audience. Later analysis of Puppet Motel praised its surrealistic and dreamlike qualities, and as a leading representative of a trend of experimental or artistic software marketed by publishers in the 1990s.

== Gameplay ==
Anderson appears as a ventriloquist dummy throughout certain rooms of Puppet Motel to direct the player.

Players navigate Puppet Motel through a main menu named the Hallway of Time to explore 33 interactive and multimedia elements. Each element, described as a "room", is selected by users as icons cast as shadows, such as a receiver, violin, television set, or aeroplane. The rooms take various forms, from roomlike spaces or screens with abstract visual elements. Players navigate throughout using the mouse to point and click at elements, drag and drop them, or move the cursor to manipulate the position, lighting, size or perspective of onscreen images. An electrical plug is a recurrent motif throughout each room which, when located and interacted with, returns players to the menu.

Musician and artist Laurie Anderson appears throughout the software in full motion video to perform as herself, or to voice a "digital dummy" ventriloquist puppet that guides the players in some rooms. Some rooms invite direct intervention by the user; for instance, in the 'Cutting Room', players can use the mouse to manipulate video and audio in a video editing console to make a music video, and in the 'Writing Room', players can edit the text of Crime and Punishment by rewriting the text. An instrument room showcases a gallery of instruments made by Anderson, including the tape bow violin. A 'Phone Room' directs the player to an accompanying Voyager website titled The Green Room, where users can download additional content, such as video, audio, and written updates from Anderson during her Nerve Bible tour.

== Development ==
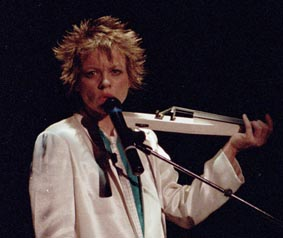
Anderson, pictured in 1986

Puppet Motel was developed as part of an interconnected series of creative projects by Anderson. The software integrated music from her 1994 studio album Bright Red, featuring a song of the same name, and its accompanying Spring 1995 tour Nerve Bible, with several new compositions including "Down in Soho" and "The Box". The Voyager Company executive Bob Stein offered to translate Anderson's Nerve Bible performances into software, originally conceived as a "set-building project" for the tour. Stein stated the proposal came from a desire to explore new forms of expression in the publisher's software lineup. Anderson was enthused in translating her work to CD-ROM, describing it as a "perfect" art form she completely understood, stating the medium "was not about plot, which has always been a problem for me - it's all about association". She said she had "lots of ideas" to bring to the project, seeking a "very visual" and "cinematic" quality, citing horror film and James Joyce as initial inspiration.

Anderson invited Taiwanese filmmaker and mixed media-artist Hsin-Chien Huang to design the software after viewing his work as a judge for the New Voices New Visions new media competition in 1994. Hsin-Chien moved to New York City to collaborate with Anderson on the project. Anderson and Hsin-Chien both stated it was challenging to develop interactive features that could "give the most power" to the user, whilst maintaining attention on Anderson's performances and storytelling. To find this balance, several versions were developed and discarded to create a working prototype. A visit to exhibits of dolls at the Vent Haven Museum in Kentucky whilst on tour inspired the concept of the ventriloquist dummy as narrator and alter ego of Anderson in the software.

Voyager launched Puppet Motel during Anderson's Nerve Bible tour in 1995, sponsoring the tour, and demonstrating and selling the software at kiosks. Elements of the software were also included in the visuals of the tour. The CD-ROM was exhibited at the San Jose Museum of Art and Whitney Museum. Following its release, Anderson and Hsin-Chien continued to sporadically collaborate on artistic projects, including a virtual reality work titled Chalkroom in 2018.

== Reception ==
=== Sales ===
By 1996, Voyager stated that Puppet Motel had sold 10,000 units, which Wired opined was "not bad" by the standards of the publisher; whilst the magazine stated it was "lauded as [an] art object", its commercial performance did not prevent the company from decline and disbandment the following year. Anderson remarked that Puppet Motel did not sell well and that the software was a "bet that just didn't pay off". Jon McKenzie of TDR stated that the software briefly sold well due to its marketing and tie-in with Anderson's music and performances.

=== Critical reception ===
Reception

Review scores
Publication	Score
Electronic Entertainment	4.5/5
Entertainment Weekly	A−
MacUser	4/5

Critics viewed that the design of Puppet Motel was original and innovative, and that its design distinguished it from other software of the time. Its nonlinear and interactive design was generally commended, with CNET stating that its interactivity was "endless" and blurred the lines between audience and performer, and Marilyn Gillen of Billboard writing that "getting lost here is most of the fun". Similarly, Salon cofounder Scott Anderson wrote that the software playfully adopted a "variety of interactive strategies" and compelled exploration. The Washington Post found its nonlinearity intriguing, but considered it led to no movement or momentum, led to "a lot of time in transition" between scenes, and the medium did not match Anderson's creative vision. Reviewers cautioned the software would likely be inaccessible to a general audience, such as Newsweek, who wrote players "may find the interactive elements too lowkey and confusing [and] real fans might want more music than the mostly instrumental background fare".

The tone and themes of Puppet Motel also received praise and analysis. Critics wrote that its tone had dark, melancholy and surrealistic qualities, particularly in its use of shadows and dreamlike imagery, with Scott Rosenberg of the San Francisco Examiner considering the game to distinguish itself with a "consistent voice" that consisted of an "ineffable sadness", dark tone, gloom and "alarming" emptiness. Several critics considered the game conveyed a curious if critical attitude to technology, and Gilson-Ellis discussed that its use of Anderson's voice, disembodied through phones, recorded messages, and computers, emphasised a "contrast between the corporeal and the electronic". Tobler of the Museum of Communication considered its detachment from material reality and lack of narrative cohesion created an "associative structure" reminiscent of thoughts or dreams. McKenzie praised Puppet Motel for merging technology and performance, with the computer becoming a "recombinant performer" that incorporated analog media such as radios, record players, televisions, and cameras and reworked them into a digital medium.

PC Entertainment awarded it the accolade 'Breakthrough Multimedia Title' in its 1996 annual awards.

=== Retrospective reception ===
Puppet Motel has been retrospectively described as part of a trend of multimedia software marketed not as a video game but as art, experience, or performance, itself an uncommon example of an established artist pivoting to multimedia as an artistic medium. Critics evaluated that Hsin-Chien had successfully complemented Anderson's work into a digital medium.

Phil Salvador of The Obscuritory praised the software's humor and subversion of expectations, whilst considering that its "wary interest in technology" created an "outwardly difficult, even confrontational" tone critical of its own medium. Similarly, Hyperallergic considered Puppet Motel to be "uncanny" and "oddly resonant with the ways we think about the internet, language, and abstraction". French digital artist Antoine Schmitt states that Puppet Motel was influential in her artistic practice by demonstrating that the CD-ROM could be a "fundamental material" for experimental art.
