= Strange Angels (Laurie Anderson album) =

Studio album by Laurie Anderson
- Released: October 24, 1989
- Genre: Art pop
- Length: 46:04
- Label: Warner Bros. (25900)
- Producer: Laurie Anderson; Roma Baran; Mike Thorne; Arto Lindsay and Peter Scherer; Ian Ritchie; Leon Pendarvis

Laurie Anderson chronology
Home of the Brave (1986)	Strange Angels (1989)	Bright Red (1994)

Singles from Strange Angels
- 1. "Strange Angels" Released: 1989; 2. "Babydoll" Released: 1989; 3. "Beautiful Red Dress" Released: 1990

Professional ratings
Review scores
Source	Rating
AllMusic	4.5/5 stars
Christgau's Record Guide	A
Rolling Stone Album Guide	4/5 stars

Strange Angels is the fifth album overall and fourth studio album by American performance artist and singer Laurie Anderson, released by Warner Bros. Records in 1989.

With this release, Anderson attempted to move away from her previous image as a performance artist into a more musical realm. At one point, she considered the idea of compiling film soundtracks around her house into an album. She reckoned that this process would take a few weeks to complete, but ultimately decided to move in a different direction that relied more on melodies. Anderson took singing lessons after realizing that one of the songs required it. "I was working on a song and it was turning out kind of slick. It was something I never released. The back-up singers did their part and I stepped up to the mic and realized that the song should be sung. It was a little late to have the realization that I had no idea how to sing."

The album includes contributions from vocal artist Bobby McFerrin. Its cover photo was shot by Robert Mapplethorpe, who died several months before the album's release. One of the songs on this album, "The Dream Before" (also known as "Hansel and Gretel Are Alive and Well") had been introduced several years earlier in her short film What You Mean We? while she had performed "Babydoll" and "The Day the Devil" years previously on Saturday Night Live.

"The Dream Before" contains the phrase "history is an angel being blown backwards into the future" and further references and quotes Walter Benjamin's musing on Paul Klee's painting Angelus Novus, the ninth of Benjamin's Theses on the Philosophy of History.

== Release ==
Reaction to Anderson's new direction was mostly positive. Publications such as the Rolling Stone Album Guide noted Anderson's pivot to a more "musical approach" that relied more on singing than talking. Robert Christgau of the Village Voice gave Strange Angels an A rating and said that the album contained her most "mellifluous music she's ever recorded." Her next album would not be released for five years.

Strange Angels received a nomination for a Grammy Award for Best Alternative Music Album.

== Track listing ==
All lyrics are written by Laurie Anderson, except where noted.

No.	Title	Lyrics	Length
1.	"Strange Angels"		3:51
2.	"Monkey's Paw"		4:33
3.	"Coolsville"		4:34
4.	"Ramon"		5:03
5.	"Babydoll"		3:38
6.	"Beautiful Red Dress"		4:43
7.	"The Day the Devil"	Laurie Anderson; Peter Laurence Gordon	4:00
8.	"The Dream Before"		3:03
9.	"My Eyes"		5:29
10.	"Hiawatha"		6:53
Total length:			46:04

== Personnel ==
- Laurie Anderson – vocals, keyboards, drum programming, percussion on "Coolsville"
- Scott Johnson – guitar
- Arto Lindsay – guitar
- Ray Phiri – guitar
- John Selolwane – guitar
- Chris Spedding – guitar
- David Spinozza – guitar
- Jimi Tunnell – guitar
- Gib Wharton – pedal steel guitar
- Peter Scherer – bass, keyboards, drum programming
- Mark Dresser – bass
- Mark Egan – bass
- Bakithi Khumalo – fretless bass
- Tony Levin – Chapman stick
- Robbie Kilgore – keyboards
- David LeBolt – keyboards, synthesizers
- Mike Thorne – keyboards, percussion, drum programming
- "Blue" Gene Tyranny – keyboards
- Tom "T-Bone" Wolk – accordion
- Joey Baron – drums
- Anton Fier – drums
- Steve Gadd – drums
- Manolo Badrena – percussion
- Cyro Baptista – percussion
- Errol "Crusher" Bennett – percussion
- Bill Buchen – percussion
- Sue Hadjopoulos – percussion
- David Van Tieghem – percussion
- Naná Vasconcelos – percussion
- Jimmy Bralower – drum programming
- Leon Pendarvis – drum programming
- Ian Ritchie – drum programming
- Alex Foster – alto saxophone
- Lenny Pickett – tenor saxophone, horn arrangements
- Louis Del Gatto – baritone saxophone
- Laurie Frink – trumpet
- Earl Gardner – trumpet
- Steve Turre – trombone, conch shell
- Hugh McCracken – harmonica
- Bobby McFerrin – vocals
- Phillip Ballou – backing vocals
- Benny Diggs – backing vocals
- Lisa Fischer – backing vocals
- Yolanda Lee – backing vocals
- Meat Loaf – backing vocals, chant
- Paulette McWilliams – backing vocals
- B.J. Nelson – backing vocals
- Angela Clemmons-Patrick – backing vocals
- The Roches – backing vocals
- Darryl Tookes – backing vocals
- Diane Wilson – backing vocals

Technical

- Eric Liljestrand – recording engineer, Macintosh programming, drum programming, sampling
- Neil Dorfsman, Bob Clearmountain, Jay Healy, Josh Abbey – mixing
- Robert Mapplethorpe – cover photography

=== "Babydoll" ===
The lyrics to this song appeared on the liner for the vinyl recording, centered and formatted into the shape of a doll.

== Music videos ==
In lieu of filming a standard music video to promote the album, Anderson instead taped a series of 60-second "Personal Service Announcements" in which she humorously discussed the economy and American culture. She later produced a music video for "Beautiful Red Dress".
