= Bright Red =

Studio album by Laurie Anderson
- Released: October 25, 1994
- Studios: The Lobby (New York City); Skyline (New York City); Westside (London)
- Genres: Art pop, ambient pop
- Length: 52:19
- Label: Warner Bros.
- Producers: Brian Eno, Laurie Anderson

Laurie Anderson chronology
Strange Angels (1989)	Bright Red (1994)	The Ugly One with the Jewels and Other Stories (1995)

Professional ratings
Review scores
Source	Rating
AllMusic	3/5 stars
Rolling Stone	4/5 stars
Select	2/5 medals

Bright Red is the fifth studio album by American avant-garde musician Laurie Anderson, released by Warner Bros. in 1994. The album continues the more pop-oriented direction Anderson launched with Strange Angels. Produced by Brian Eno (who also co-wrote several of the songs with Anderson), Bright Red is divided into two parts: "Bright Red" and "Tightrope".

== Background ==
Anderson originally planned to forgo electronics for the recording of Bright Red and instead focus on more organic instrumentation from bass guitars, accordions, violins, Brazilian percussion, and drums. However, Anderson later decided to process these instruments with a computer program and slow them down. Eno advised Anderson to remove some instrumentation from certain songs to keep the production sparse. Anderson likened the final product to some of her music from the early 1980s and said that the songs on Bright Red were less structured compared to her more recent work.

The song "The Puppet Motel" was also featured on an interactive CD-ROM titled Puppet Motel, released by Anderson in 1995. "Speak My Language" is a re-recording of a song Anderson previously performed on the soundtrack to the 1993 film Faraway, So Close and was also featured in the 1995 film Fallen Angels. The song "Beautiful Pea Green Boat" has additional lyrics from the poem "The Owl and the Pussycat" by Edward Lear (misspelled "Edwin" in the album's liner notes). Lou Reed co-wrote "In Our Sleep" with Anderson and also contributed guitar and vocals to the song, which also featured drumming from Joey Baron, tambourine polyrhythms from Cyro Baptista, and synth textures from Eno. Reed and Anderson married in 2008 after living with each other in West Village for over a decade.

No commercial singles were originally planned for the album, although Billboard announced in its July 1994 publication that "The Puppet Motel", "World Without End" and "Poison" would be serviced to college rock, modern rock, and adult album alternative radio stations. Linda Goldstein, who served as Anderson's manager, expressed optimism that these formats, particularly album alternative, would lead to more commercial success. She also said that there were negotiations underway to release the album in select book stores to promote Anderson's book, Stories From the Nerve Bible. Despite initial plans not to issue a commercial single, "In Our Sleep" was released as a CD single in 1995.

== Track listing ==
All lyrics and music by Laurie Anderson, except where otherwise indicated.

Bright Red

1. "Speechless (The Eagle and the Weasel)" – 5:20
2. "Bright Red" (additional lyrics from Isaiah 13:21) – 3:12
3. "The Puppet Motel" (lyrics: Anderson; music: Anderson, Brian Eno) – 3:09
4. "Speak My Language" – 3:38
5. "World Without End" – 2:47
6. "Freefall" – 4:32
7. "Muddy River" (lyrics: Anderson; music: Anderson, Eno) – 3:02

Tightrope

8. "Beautiful Pea Green Boat" (additional lyrics from "The Owl and the Pussycat" by Edward Lear) – 4:20
9. "Love Among the Sailors" – 2:49
10. "Poison" (lyrics: Anderson; music: Anderson, Eno) – 3:47
11. "In Our Sleep" (lyrics: Anderson, Lou Reed; music: Anderson) – 2:31
12. "Night in Baghdad" – 3:23
13. "Tightrope" (lyrics: Anderson; music: Anderson, Eno) – 6:02
14. "Same Time Tomorrow" – 3:51

== Personnel ==
Musicians

- Laurie Anderson – vocals (tracks 1–14), keyboards (1–2, 4–6, 8–14), violin (4), percussion (8)
- Phil Ballou – back-up vocals (1, 7–8)
- Cyro Baptista – temple blocks (1), gong (1), surdo (3–4, 8, 11, 13–14), shaker (3–4, 8, 12–14), triangle (4, 12), tambourine (11), ceramic drum (12), tubes (12)
- Joey Baron – drums (1, 3–4, 6–7, 10–11)
- Brian Eno – treatments (1, 3–4, 13), keyboards (1–6, 8, 10–11, 13), drum treatments (6, 10–11), loops (8, 10)
- Ben Fenner – bass guitar (1)
- Guy Klucevsek – accordion (1, 4, 8, 12)
- Gerry Leonard – guitar (1, 5–6, 8, 11–12)
- Arto Lindsay – vocals (2)
- Greg Cohen – guitar (3–4), bass guitar (3–4, 6)
- Jamie West-Oram – guitar (4, 6)
- Kevin Killen – treatments (5, 8)
- Adrian Belew – guitar (6, 8, 10, 12–13)
- Neil Conti – shaker (6)
- Dougie Bowne – drums (8)
- Marc Ribot – guitar (10)
- Lou Reed – vocals (11), guitar (11)
- Peter Scherer – keyboards (12)

Technical

- Brian Eno – producer
- Laurie Anderson – co-producer
- Kevin Killen – engineer, mixing
- Greg Cohen – music director
- Joe Ferla – additional basic tracks engineer
- Ben Fenner – overdubs engineer (Westside)
- Alec Head – additional overdubs engineer (The Lobby)
- Hiro Ishihara – assistant engineer
- Andy Baker – assistant engineer
- Danton Supple – assistant engineer
- Miles Green – assistant engineer
- Bob Ludwig – mastering
- Yolanda Cuomo – design
- Monika Rittershaus – cover photo
- Neil Selkirk – inside front cover photo
- Stephen Cohen – back cover photo
- John Walker – video images
- Annie Leibovitz – MRI image
- Samantha Levin – snapshots
