= United States Live =

Live album by Laurie Anderson
- Released: 1984
- Recorded: February 7–10, 1983
- Venues: Brooklyn Academy of Music, New York City
- Genres: Spoken word; avant-pop; experimental
- Length: 261:57
- Label: Warner Bros.
- Producers: Laurie Anderson; Roma Baran

Laurie Anderson chronology
Mister Heartbreak (1984)	United States Live (1984)	Home of the Brave (1986)

Professional ratings
Review scores
Source	Rating
AllMusic	3/5 stars
Christgau's Record Guide	A
Pitchfork	8.6/10
Rolling Stone	4/5 stars

United States Live is the first live album and third overall album by American avant-garde singer-songwriter Laurie Anderson. Released as a 5-record boxed set (later reissued on four CDs), the album is a recording of a performance of Anderson's piece United States at Brooklyn Academy of Music in New York City in February 1983.

United States was Anderson's magnum opus performance-art piece featuring musical numbers, spoken word pieces, and animated vignettes about life in the United States. Split into four parts (United States I–IV) segments ranged from humorous, such as "Yankee See", which gently chided Anderson's record label, Warner Bros. Records, for signing her in the first place, to the apocalyptic anthem "O Superman", which had been an unexpected top-10 hit for Anderson on the UK music charts in 1981.

Originally, United States was presented over the course of two nights, running some eight hours. The live album set is a truncated rendering of the performance, omitting many segments that were solely of a visual nature.

Among the songs performed on the album was "Language Is a Virus (from Outer Space)", a pop-like song based upon a phrase attributed to William S. Burroughs. Anderson later performed a modified arrangement of the song (including a spoken-word prologue titled "Difficult Listening Hour") in her 1986 concert film Home of the Brave and recorded a studio version for its soundtrack album.

Although Anderson has since created numerous other major performance pieces (i.e. Moby-Dick, Stories from the Nerve Bible, Happiness, The End of the Moon), United States Live remains, to date, the only serious attempt at producing anything approaching a full-length recording of any of these performances, although her previous album Big Science and her segment of the compilation You're the Guy I Want to Share My Money With consisted of studio-recorded excerpts from United States.

In 2024, Anderson debuted a followup production, ARK: United States V; it has yet to be announced whether a recording of it will be released.

== Track listing ==
All tracks written by Laurie Anderson except as indicated.

=== Part One ===
==== Side one ====
1. "Say Hello" – 5:01
2. "Walk the Dog" – 6:45
3. "Violin Solo" – 2:13
4. "Closed Circuits" For voice and amplified mike stand – 6:03
5. "For a Large and Changing Room" – 2:50
6. "Pictures of It" For acoustic Tape Bow – 1:32
7. "The Language of the Future" – 8:02

==== Side two ====
1. "Cartoon Song" – 1:12
2. "Small Voice" For speaker-in-mouth – 2:03
3. "Three Walking Songs" For Tape Bow Violin – 4:19
4. "The Healing Horn" – 3:01
5. "New Jersey Turnpike" – 11:19 see New Jersey Turnpike

==== Side three ====
1. "So Happy Birthday" – 6:23
2. "EngliSH" – 2:08
3. "Dance of Electricity" – 3:02 see Nikola Tesla
4. "Three Songs for Paper, Film and Video" – 6:02
5. "Sax Solo" For Tape Bow Violin – 0:55
6. "Sax Duet" – 0:38
7. "Born, Never Asked" – 5:16

=== Part Two ===
==== Side four ====
1. "From the Air" – 2:46
2. "Beginning French" – 2:16
3. "O Superman" – 11:05
4. "Talkshow" – 6:57

==== Side five ====
1. "Frames for the Pictures" – 1:08
2. "Democratic Way" – 1:41
3. "Looking for You" – 1:19
4. "Walking and Falling" – 1:21
5. "Private Property" – 3:04
6. "Neon Duet" For violin and neon bow – 3:52
7. "Let X=X" – 6:17
8. "The Mailman's Nightmare" – 0:46
9. "Difficult Listening Hour" – 3:10

==== Side six ====
1. "Language Is a virus from outer space – William S. Burroughs" – 7:55
2. "Reverb" – 0:26
3. "If You Can't Talk About It, Point to It (for Ludwig Wittgenstein and Reverend Ike)" – 0:33
4. "Violin Walk" – 2:44
5. "City Song" – 3:34
6. "Finnish Farmers" – 5:13

=== Part Three ===
==== Side seven ====
1. "Red Map" – 1:57
2. "Hey Ah" – 3:50
3. "Bagpipe Solo" – 3:17
4. "Steven Weed" – 1:07 see Patricia Hearst/Steven Weed
5. "Time and a Half" – 2:14
6. "Voices on Tape" – 1:28
7. "Example #22" – 2:33
8. "Strike" – 2:11
9. "False Documents" – 1:59
10. "New York Social Life" – 3:32
11. "A Curious Phenomenon" – 1:06
12. "Yankee See" – 7:58

==== Side-eight ====
1. "I Dreamed I Had to Take a Test..." – 1:19
2. "Running Dogs" – 0:38
3. "Four, Three, Two, One" – 1:15
4. "The Big Top" – 2:52
5. "It Was Up in the Mountains" – 2:14
6. "Odd Objects" For light-in-mouth – 4:03
7. "Dr. Miller" (Anderson, Perry Hoberman) – 5:18
8. "Big Science" – 7:20 see Big Science
9. "Big Science Reprise" – 1:47

=== Part Four ===
==== Side nine ====
1. "Cello Solo" – 2:44
2. "It Tango" – 1:51
3. "Blue Lagoon" – 9:38
4. "Hothead (La Langue d'Amour)" – 4:47
5. "Stiff Neck" – 1:33
6. "Telephone Song" – 1:34
7. "Sweaters" – 3:58
8. "We've Got Four Big Clocks (and they're all ticking)" – 2:24

==== Side ten ====
1. "Song for Two Jims" – 2:56
2. "Over the River" – 3:30
3. "Mach 20" – 2:47 see Mach number
4. "Rising Sun" – 3:25
5. "The Visitors" – 3:01
6. "The Stranger" – 1:57
7. "Classified" – 5:25
8. "Going Somewhere?" – 0:55
9. "Fireworks" – 2:46
10. "Dog Show" – 0:48
11. "Lighting Out for the Territories" – 3:13 see The Adventures of Huckleberry Finn

The four-cassette set has each part on its own cassette.
The four-CD set is almost as above, except that the last three tracks of Part One are at the beginning of CD 2 due to CD playing time limitations.

== Personnel ==
- Laurie Anderson – mic stand, violin bows, tape-bow violin, electric violin, harmonizer, pillow speaker, toy saxophone, voice (tracks C1 to J11), vocoder, neon violin, glasses, Oberheim OB-Xa, Synclavier, tamboura, telephone, Jew's harp, artwork, design
- Peter Gordon – Prophet synthesizer, voice (tracks C1 to D4)
- Geraldine Pontius – voice (tracks C1 to D4)
- Joseph Kos – voice (tracks C1 to D4)
- Chuck Fisher – clarinet (tracks E1 to J11), saxophone (tracks C1 to J11)
- Bill Obrecht – flute (tracks E1 to J11), saxophone (tracks C1 to J11)
- Anne DeMarinis – Oberheim OB-Xa, Synclavier (tracks E1 to J11)
- David Van Tieghem – drums, percussion (tracks C1 to J11)
- Roma Baran – accordion (tracks G1 to H9)
- Rufus Harley – bagpipes (tracks G1 to H9)
- Shelley Karson – soprano vocals (tracks I1 to J11)

Technical

- Leanne Ungar – engineer
- Dominick Maita, Richard Kaye – mixing
- Lynn Goldsmith – cover photograph

== Charts ==
Album

Year	Chart	Position
1985	The Billboard 200	192
