= Mister Heartbreak =

Studio album by Laurie Anderson
- Released: February 14, 1984
- Recorded: July–December 1983
- Studios: The Lobby (New York City); RCA (New York City); A & R (New York City); 39th Street Music (New York City)
- Genres: Art pop; art rock
- Length: 40:16
- Label: Warner Bros.
- Producers: Laurie Anderson; Bill Laswell; Roma Baran; Peter Gabriel

Laurie Anderson chronology
Big Science (1982)	Mister Heartbreak (1984)	United States Live (1984)

Singles from Mister Heartbreak
- 1. "Sharkey's Day" Released: 1984

Mister Heartbreak is the second studio album by American avant-garde artist and musician Laurie Anderson, released on February 14, 1984, by Warner Bros. Records.

== Background ==
In a 1984 interview with Billboard, Anderson said that she approached the recording process for Mister Heartbreak by creating a record "that could exist on its own without pictures". Anderson used the Synclavier on every track on the album and also incorporated some singing beyond the pitch-shifted vocals that she relied on for the first album. She described some of the tracks as "love songs" that were "much more personal".

The album's opening track, "Sharkey's Day", formed the basis of a music video. Writer and visual artist William S. Burroughs read the lyrics of "Sharkey's Night", while Peter Gabriel co-wrote and provided vocals on "Excellent Birds", an alternate version of which, "This Is the Picture (Excellent Birds)", appeared on the CD edition of his fifth studio album So (1986). According to Anderson, she and Gabriel "could never agree on what a bassline was...it turned into a standoff and so we each put out our own version of the song." A third version of the song can be heard in the music video version, directed by Dean Winkler.

"Gravity's Angel" borrows imagery from Thomas Pynchon's novel Gravity's Rainbow (1973). Anderson had "wanted to make an opera of that book ... and asked him if that would be OK... He said, 'You can do it, but you can only use banjo.' And so I thought, 'Well, thanks. I don't know if I could do it like that.'" "Blue Lagoon" contains allusions to other tales of the sea: William Shakespeare's play The Tempest (1611) and Herman Melville's epic novel Moby-Dick (1851).

Despite Anderson's aversion to guitars on Big Science, she changed her approach on Mister Heartbreak and employed the services of King Crimson guitarist Adrian Belew, who appeared on four tracks. Belew recalled that Anderson originally conceived of "Sharkey's Day" as having a "hoedown kind of feel" that centered around an instrument resembling a Jew's harp. When describing his approach to the song, Belew stated that "I gravitated toward a very aggressive sound from a pedal called the Foxx Tone Machine, an octave fuzz pedal whose sound resembles the solo sound in Jimi Hendrix's 'Purple Haze'". Anderson subsequently reworked "Sharkey's Day" to accommodate for Belew's guitar overdubs.

Most of the songs on the album were later performed in Anderson's concert film Home of the Brave (1986). Burroughs appears in the film in two brief segments, reciting lines from "Sharkey's Night". "Gravity's Angel" was used in a trailer for the 1991 film Naked Lunch, an adaptation of Burroughs' 1959 novel of the same name. "Sharkey's Night" was also featured in the Australian short documentary film Ladies Please! (1995). The album art was originally made as a series of lithographs published with Bud Shark when Anderson was a visiting artist at Anderson Ranch Arts Center in Snowmass Village, Colorado.

== Content ==
Like its predecessor, Big Science (1982), Mister Heartbreak contains reworked elements of Anderson's performance piece United States Live ("Langue d'Amour", "Kokoku", and "Blue Lagoon"). Anderson also introduced new material ("Sharkey's Day"/"Sharkey's Night" and "Gravity's Angel"). "Excellent Birds", written in collaboration with English singer Peter Gabriel, was written for South Korean video artist Nam June Paik's installation "Good Morning, Mr. Orwell".

Professional ratings
Review scores
Source	Rating
AllMusic	4/5 stars
Rolling Stone	4/5 stars
Sounds	5/5 stars
The Village Voice	A−

== Critical reception ==
Billboard identified the album as an "intriguing" collection of songs that "bridge new music's current and original, avant garde definitions without compromise." Cashbox noted the use of "exotic instruments" on the album, including plywood, electronic conch shells, and shekeres. Music Week believed that the album would be a "satisfying, enjoyable experience" for those who have seen Anderson live.

== Track listing ==
All tracks are written by Laurie Anderson, except when noted.

No.	Title	Writer(s)	Length
1.	"Sharkey's Day"		7:41
2.	"Langue d'Amour"		6:12
3.	"Gravity's Angel"		6:02
4.	"Kokoku"		7:03
5.	"Excellent Birds"	Anderson, Peter Gabriel	3:12
6.	"Blue Lagoon"		7:03
7.	"Sharkey's Night"	Anderson, William S. Burroughs	2:29
Total length:			40:16

== Personnel ==
Musicians

- Laurie Anderson – vocals (tracks 1–6); Synclavier (track 1–6); violin (track 1); whistle (track 1); electronic conches (track 2); vocoder (track 2); bell (track 3); percussion (track 4)
- Adrian Belew – guitar (tracks 1, 3, 6, 7)
- Anton Fier – drums (track 1); toms (track 4); wood block (track 4)
- Bill Laswell – bass guitar (tracks 1, 3–6)
- Daniel Ponce – iya (tracks 1); ikonkolo (track 1); shekere (track 1); double bell from the Cameroons (track 1)
- November (Michelle Cobbs, Dolette McDonald, Brenda Nelson) – backing vocals (track 1)
- Peter Gabriel – backing vocals (tracks 2–3); vocals (track 5); Synclavier (track 5); LinnDrum (track 5)
- David Van Tieghem – plywood (track 3); bowls (track 3); Simmons drums (track 3); drums (track 3); steel drum (track 6); gato (track 6); bamboo (track 6)
- Sang Won Park – kayagum (track 4)
- Phoebe Snow – backing vocals (track 4)
- Atsuko Yuma – backing vocals (track 4)
- Connie Harvey – Japanese chorus (track 4)
- Janet Wright – Japanese chorus (track 4)
- Nile Rodgers – guitar (track 5)
- Bill Blaber – soprano (track 6)
- William S. Burroughs – vocals (track 7)

Technical

- Laurie Anderson – co-producer (tracks 1–2, 4–7); producer (track 3); art; graphics
- Bill Laswell – co-producer (tracks 1, 4, 7); mixing assistance (track 3)
- Roma Baran – co-producer (tracks 2, 6)
- Peter Gabriel – co-producer (track 5)
- Leanne Ungar – engineer
- Bob Bielecki – technical consultant; systems design; Synclavier spectral displays
- Mike Getlin – assistant engineer
- Joe Lopes – assistant engineer
- Pat Martin – assistant engineer
- Larry Franke – assistant engineer
- Tim Cox – assistant engineer
- Mike Krowiak – mixing assistant
- Bob Ludwig – mastering
- Howie Weinberg – mastering
- Bud Shark – printing

== Charts ==
Chart (1984)	Peak position
Canada RPM	41
Dutch Album Top 100	23
New Zealand Albums (RMNZ)	12
Swedish Albums (Sverigetopplistan)	46
Swiss Albums (Schweizer Hitparade)	19
UK Albums Chart	93
US Billboard 200	60
