= Life on a String (album) =

Studio album by Laurie Anderson
- Released: August 21, 2001
- Recorded: 2000–2001
- Studios: Lobby Studio, New York City; Magic Shop, New York City; Edison Recording, New York City
- Genres: Avant-garde; experimental; pop
- Length: 43:55
- Label: Nonesuch
- Producers: Laurie Anderson; Hal Willner

Laurie Anderson chronology
Talk Normal: The Laurie Anderson Anthology (2000)	Life on a String (2001)	Live in New York (2002)

Professional ratings
Review scores
Source	Rating
AllMusic	2.5/5 stars
Rolling Stone	3.5/5 stars

Life on a String is the sixth studio album by American performance artist Laurie Anderson, released in 2001 on Nonesuch Records.

One of Anderson's predominantly musical (as opposed to spoken-word) albums, Life on a String was recorded at the Lobby Studios in New York City under the musical direction of Skúli Sverrisson, and produced by Anderson and Hal Willner. Guest musicians on the album include Van Dyke Parks, Mocean Worker, Mitchell Froom and Lou Reed.

The first three songs, "One White Whale", "The Island Where I Come From", and "Pieces and Parts", were taken from her show Songs and Stories from Moby Dick. The song "Slip Away" is about the death of her father. "Washington Street" is about Washington Street, Manhattan.

== Track listing ==
All tracks composed by Laurie Anderson, except where indicated

1. "One White Whale" – 1:58
2. "The Island Where I Come From" – 4:08
3. "Pieces and Parts" – 3:36
4. "Here with You" – 2:22
5. "Slip Away" – 5:50
6. "My Compensation" – 2:28 (Anderson, Skúli Sverrisson)
7. "Dark Angel" – 3:22
8. "Broken" – 3:19
9. "Washington Street" – 4:41
10. "Statue of Liberty" – 4:24
11. "One Beautiful Evening" – 5:05
12. "Life on a String" – 2:57

Some copies have "Rumba Club" as a bonus track.

== Personnel ==
- Laurie Anderson – vocals, violin, keyboards, percussion
- Skúli Sverrisson – musical direction, bass, guitar, keyboards, sounds, percussion programming
- Joey Baron – percussion (1), drums (5, 8, 9)
- Martin Brumbach – percussion arrangement (11)
- Vinicius Cantuária – percussion (12)
- Mino Cinelu – percussion (2)
- Tim Cobb – double bass (7)
- Greg Cohen – arco bass (2)
- Danny Frankel – percussion, handclapping (2), box-o-toys (11)
- Erik Friedlander – cello (3, 4, 5, 10)
- Bill Frisell – guitar (9)
- Mitchell Froom – mellotron (3, 8, 11), claviola (3), wurlitzer (8)
- Eyvind Kang – violin (3)
- John Kelly – backing vocals (1)
- Liheng – baritone banhu (5)
- Tom Nelis – vocals (1)
- Van Dyke Parks – keyboards, conductor, string arranger (10)
- Lou Reed – guitar (11)
- Ben Rubin – bells (9)
- Peter Scherer – keyboards (5, 8, 12)
- Jamshied Sharifi – strings, additional keyboards (5)
- Chris Speed – saxophone (2)
- David Torn – loops (2)
- Cuong Vu – trumpet (2)
- Hal Willner – turntables (6), sampling (6, 7)
- Mocean Worker – beats, keyboards (11)
- Fred Zlotkin, Jeanne Leblanc – cello (7)
- Judy Witmer, Karen Dreyfus, Sue Pray, Vincent Lionti – viola (7)
- Ann Leathers, Barry Finclair, Carol Webb, Ellen Payne, Enrico Dicecco, Heidi Modr, Jan Mullen, Jean Ingraham, Joel Pitchon, Jonathan Dinklage, Richard Sortomme – violin (7)
- Elena Barere – concertmaster (7)

Technical

- Produced by Laurie Anderson and Hal Willner
- Recorded by Martin Brumbach at The Lobby, New York City
- Additional engineers – Bob Brockmann, Dante DeSole, Josiah Gluck, Laurie Anderson
- Mixed by Bob Brockman at NuMedia, New York City, except 2 and 10 by Martin Brumbach
- Mastered by Robert C. Ludwig at Gateway Mastering Studios (Portland, ME, USA)
- Executive producer – David Bither
- Artwork – Barbara De Wilde
- Photography by Victor Schrager
- Cover photography – Noah Greenberg
