= Paul Dutton =

Canadian singer and writer (1943–2025)

Paul Dutton (29 December 1943 – 27 May 2025) was a Canadian poet, novelist, essayist and oral sound artist.

== Life and career ==
Dutton was born in Toronto, Ontario, Canada on 29 December 1943. A member of the legendary Four Horsemen sound poetry quartet (1970–1988), along with Rafael Barreto-Rivera, Steve McCaffery, and the late bpNichol, Dutton joined his soundsinging oralities and harmonica-playing to John Oswald's alto sax and Michael Snow's piano and synthesizer in the free-improvisation band CCMC (1989 to 20??). He has appeared in poetry festivals in Germany, France, and Venezuela, and at music festivals in Canada, the Netherlands, and Argentina. An accomplished writer, in addition to his published books, he has written dozens of published essays on music and writing.

Dutton collaborated with a wide range of musicians, including fellow oral sound artists Jaap Blonk, Koichi Makigami, Phil Minton, and David Moss in the group Five Men Singing, John Butcher, Bob Ostertag, Phil Durrant, John Russell, Lee Ranaldo, Christian Marclay, Günter Christmann, Thomas Charmetant, Xavier Charles, and Jacques Di Donato. His soundsinging has been called "fascinating, inventive, grippingly obsessive" (The Wire).

"(Five Men Singing) exposes every note, tone, timbre and texture that can be vibrated by the uvula, dredged from the throat and buzzed from the cheeks and lips."

He later formed Quintet à Bras in company with two French poets and two French instrumentalists, and in 2009, Dutton performed at The Scream In High Park, which is an annual literary festival in Toronto.

Dutton died on 27 May 2025, at the age of 81.

== Criticism ==
- "The hybridity of Dutton's æsthetic accomplishments is readily apparent on this CD's (Mouth Pieces) opening track, Reverberations. Framing the words "gong" and "going" with the use of vowel-generated overtones, Dutton crystallizes form and content in a perfectly balanced musical and literary mantra."
- "Whether reading or gurgling, solo Dutton remains compelling."

== Awards ==
- bpNichol Chapbook Award, 1989.
- Villa Waldberta Scholarship, Cultural Department, City of Munich, 1998
- Dora Mavor Moore Award, Toronto Association of Performing Arts, 2007

== Anthologies ==
- Best Canadian Essays 1990. (Fifth House Publishers, 1990).
- Hard Times: A New Fiction Anthology. (The Mercury Press, 1990).
- Carnival. (Insomniac Press, 1996).
- The Echoing Years: Contemporary Canadian & Irish Verse (School of Humanities Publications, Waterford Institute of Technology, 2007)
- In Fine Form: The Canadian Book of Form Poetry (Polestar, 2005)
- Fümms bö wö tää zää Uu: Stimmen und Klänge der Lautpoesie (Book-CD), (Scholzverlag, 2002)

== Books ==
- The Book of Numbers (Porcupine's Quill, 1979).
- Right Hemisphere, Left Ear (Coach House Press, 1979).
- Visionary Portraits (The Mercury Press, 1991) ISBN 978-0-920544-80-8
- Aurealities (Coach House Books, 1991) ISBN 0-88910-414-X
- The Plastic Typewriter (Underwhich Editions, 1993) ISBN 0-88658-087-0
- Partial Additives (Writers Forum, c/o Underwhich Editions, 1994) ISBN 0-86162-551-X
- Several Women Dancing (The Mercury Press, 2002) ISBN 978-1-55128-096-7

=== With The Four Horsemen ===
- Horse D'Oeuvres (General Publishing, 1975)
- The Prose Tattoo (Membrane Press, 1983)

=== With Sandra Braman ===
- Spokesheards (Longspoon Press, 1983)

== Recordings ==
- Blues, Roots, Legends, Shouts & Hollers (Starborne Productions LP, STB-0180, 1980)
- Mouth Pieces (OHM Éditions, 2000) ISBN AVTR 021
- Oralizations (Ambiances Magnétiques, 2005) ISBN AM 130
