= Stephen Cain =

Canadian poet and academic

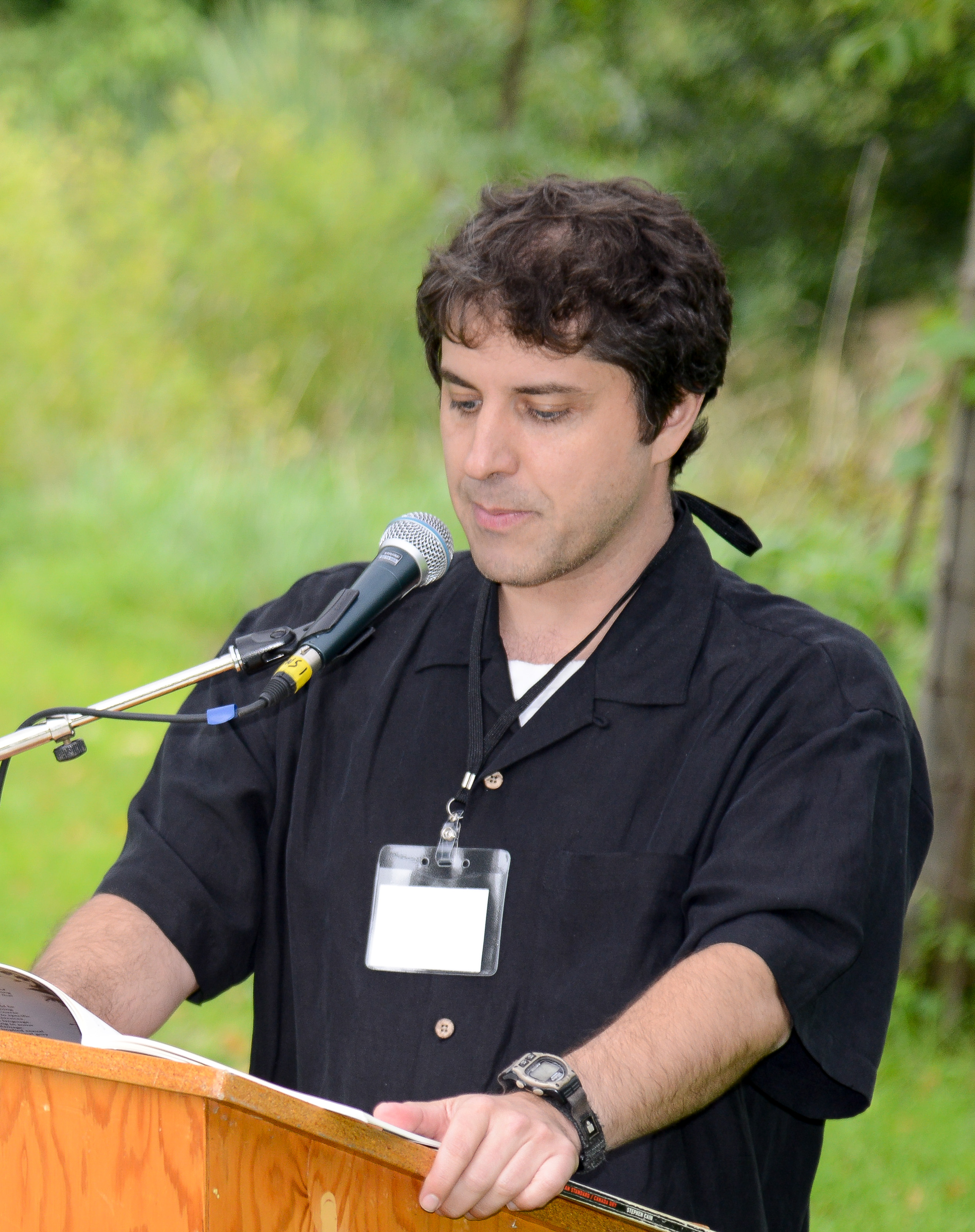
Cain at the Eden Mills Writers' Festival in 2013

Stephen Cain (born 1970) is a Canadian poet and academic.

In his seven books of poetry Cain demonstrates an interest in various poetic forms including sound poetry and concrete poetry, as well as constraint-based writing and procedural poetics. Avant-garde movements, such as Language Poetry and Oulipo, appear to be influences on his writing and his work is marked by frequent use of alliteration, pun, and disjunction. In content, his poetry often mixes pop culture with literary theory and political concerns.

He has been involved with various editorial activities including being a literary editor at the journal Queen Street Quarterly, and a fiction editor at Insomniac Press where he oversaw several first collections by prose writers including Emily Schultz and Chris Eaton.

Cain’s critical work focuses on the small press and experimental poetry, including the Canadian writer bpNichol. A collection of Nichol's early long poems was compiled and edited by Cain in 2014. With Tim Conley, he co-authored an Encyclopedia of Fictional and Fantastic Languages (2006).

He lives in Toronto where he teaches at York University.

== Bibliography ==
=== Poetry ===
- dyslexicon (1998) Coach House Books
- Torontology (2001) ECW Press
- American Standard/ Canada Dry (2005) Coach House Books
- I Can Say Interpellation (2011) Book*hug
- False Friends (2017) Book*hug
- Walking and Stealing (2024) Book*hug

=== Fiction ===
- Double Helix (with Jay MillAr) (2006)The Mercury Press

=== Non-fiction ===
- Encyclopedia of Fictional and Fantastic Languages (with Tim Conley) (2006) Greenwood Publishing Group

=== Editor ===
- bp:beginnings The Early Long Poems & Sequences of bpNichol (2014) Book*hug
