= Four Horsemen (poetry) =

Canadian arts collective, 1970-1988

The Four Horsemen was a sound poetry group of Canadian poets. It was composed of bpNichol, Rafael Barreto-Rivera, Paul Dutton, and Steve McCaffery. They also performed concrete poetry. The group was active from 1970 to 1988.

== Works ==
They released 2 12-inch vinyl records of their collaborative sound poetry (Nada Canadada, 1972; Live in the West, 1977), 2 cassettes (Bootleg, 1981; 2 Nights, 1988), as well as 3 print collections (Horse d'Oeuvres, 1977; A Little Nastiness, 1980; The Prose Tattoo, 1983) and the broadside Schedule For Another Place (1981). The group appeared in Ron Mann's 1982 documentary film Poetry in Motion.

== Style ==
Their work embraced a wide range of polyphonic possibilities, from straightforward prose through disarranged poetry, chant, nonsyntactical sound charts, improvisation in varying degrees and games in multiple forms. Previous to their work, few references were available in terms of scoring the varied levels of complexity polyvocal sound poetry could take. Their development of various forms of gridded texts added to the primarily optophonetic devices previously in literary use, releasing the scores from the rigidity imposed by the more conventional techniques found in choral work focused on extended vocal techniques.

== Legacy ==
They were Canada's first sound poetry ensemble, leading directly to the formation of at least 3 further groups: Owen Sound in Toronto (Michael Dean, David Penhale, Steven Ross Smith, Richard Truhlar), Re:Sounding in Edmonton (Douglas Barbour, Stephen Scobie) & Quatuor Gualuor in Ottawa (currently consisting of director jwcurry, Nina Drystek, and Chris Johnson).
