= Ditch (disambiguation) =

A ditch is a small depression created to channel water.

Ditch, ditching or The Ditch may also refer to

- Ditch (fortification), an obstacle designed to slow down or break up an attacking force in warfare
- Ditch (obstacle), an obstacle in cross-country equestrianism
- ditch,, an online poetry periodical
- The Ditch (website), an Irish political news website
- The Ditch, a 2010 documentary film
- Hydrangea aspera 'The Ditch', a flowering plant cultivar
- Ditching, the controlled but unintentional water landing of an aircraft
- Truancy, intentional absence from compulsory education, also known as ditching
- Redditch, informally referred to among locals as "the Ditch"
- Tasman Sea, informally referred to as the Ditch
- Ditch Davey, Australian actor

== See also ==
- Crossing the Ditch, Justin Jones and James Castrission's 2007 attempt to travel from Australia to New Zealand by sea kayak
- Ditsch, a German snack bar chain
