= Nelson Ball =

Canadian poet, publisher, bookseller

- Born: January 14, 1942; Clinton, Ontario
- Died: August 16, 2019 (aged 77); Brantford, Ontario
- Occupations: Poet, Publisher, Bookseller
- Spouse: Barbara Caruso (m. 1965)
- Writing career
- Language: English
- Genre: Poetry

Nelson Ball (January 14, 1942 – August 16, 2019) was a Canadian poet, editor, publisher, and bookseller.

== Biography ==
Nelson Ball was born in 1942 in Clinton, Ontario. He attended the University of Waterloo where he worked as a reporter for the student newspaper, The Coryphaeus. He worked at the Village Book Store in Toronto in the mid-1960s, and opened his own bookstore in 1972, first as William Nelson Books and later as Nelson Ball, Bookseller (beginning in 1985).

Ball was married to artist, writer, and publisher Barbara Caruso. They lived in Kitchener, Toronto, and Paris, Ontario. Catherine Stevenson produced a photo documentary about Ball and Caruso’s home in Paris, Ontario and an accompanying documentary about Caruso’s art

Ball died on August 16, 2019. He chose a medically assisted death.

== Writing and editing ==
As a publisher, he was responsible for landmark Canadian small press Weed/Flower Press (1965-1973). Through Weed/Flower, Ball published 40 books, including work by George Bowering, Victor Coleman, bpNichol, John Newlove, William Hawkins, and David McFadden. As an editor, he was responsible for three literary magazines: Volume 63 (1963-1967), Weed (1966-1967), and Hyphid (1968). Through his magazines, he published work by Margaret Atwood, Bruce Cockburn, David Donnell, Pat Lowther, Daphne Marlatt, Gwendolyn MacEwen, Al Purdy, Joe Rosenblatt, and many others.

As a poet, Ball published approximately 50 books and chapbooks during his lifetime, as well as dozens of leaflets and pieces of small press ephemera. His work was published by many presses including Ganglia, Coach House, ECW Press, The Mercury Press, Mansfield Press, CURVD H&z, and Proper Tales Press, and in many magazines, including Blewointment, El Corno Emplumado, Hamilton Arts & Letters, illiterature, Spudburn, The Ant’s Forefoot, and The Café Review. His poems have been published in translation in Chinese, Romanian, Nynorsk, Russian, and Swedish.

Ball was renowned for his minimalism. His poetry has been reviewed in Canadian and International journals, including Canadian Literature and Poetry. Frank Davey has written that Ball "is a poet of the minimal image; his poems, like the haiku, aim to combine the utmost economy with the sharpest possible visual clarity. They are brief, understated, and—on close scrutiny—explosive." Ball has been profiled in Canadian Notes and Queries, The Globe and Mail, the Toronto Star, and Essays on Canadian Writing.

In 2016, Ball won the bpNichol Chapbook Award for the collection Small Waterways (Apt. 9 Press). Also in 2016, he published a book of poems for children, A Vole on a Roll, which was illustrated by JonArno Lawson. In 2017, his selected poems Certain Details (edited by Stuart Ross) was published by Wilfrid Laurier University Press in the Laurier Poetry Series. In 2020, “The Nelson Ball Prize” was founded to honour “poetry of observation.” To date, it has been won by Mark Truscott, Chantal Neveu (translated by Erin Moure), Pearl Pirie, and Cameron Anstee.

His literary papers are held at the McMaster University Library.

== Selected publications ==
- Rooms of Clocks: Poems (1964–65). Kitchener: Weed/Flower press, 1965.
- Beaufort’s Scale. Kitchener: Weed/Flower press, 1967.
- Sparrows. Toronto: Weed/Flower press, 1968.
- Force Movements. Toronto: Ganglia, 1969. [Second edition—Toronto: CURVD H&Z, 1990]
- Water-Pipes & Moonlight. Toronto: Weed/Flower Press, 1969.
- The Pre-Linguistic Heights. Toronto: The Coach House Press, 1970.
- Points of Attention. With Barbara Caruso. Toronto: Weed/Flower Press, 1971.
- Round Stone. Toronto: Weed/Flower Press, 1971.
- Sparrows. Paris: presspresspress, 1990.
- With Issa: Poems 1964-1971. Toronto: ECW Press, 1991.
- Sightings. Toronto: CURVD H&Z, 1992.
- Bird Tracks on Hard Snow. Toronto: ECW Press, 1994.
- Round Table. twobitter 62. Toronto: Letters, 1996.
- The Concrete Air. Stratford: The Mercury Press, 1996.
- Almost Spring. Toronto: The Mercury Press, 1999.
- A Gathering. Paris: Rubblestone Press, 2003. [Second edition—Toronto: BookThug, 2014]
- Scrub Cedar. Ottawa: above/ground press, 2003.
- At the Edge of the Frog Pond. Toronto: The Mercury Press, 2004.
- Three-Letter Words. Mount Pleasant: Laurel Reed Books / Paris: Rubblestone Press, 2006.
- In This Thin Rain. Toronto: Mansfield Press, 2012.
- The Continuous Present. Cobourg: Proper Tales Press, 2012.
- Minutiae. Ottawa: Apt. 9 Press, 2014.
- A Rattle of Spring Frogs. Hamilton: HA&L / samizdat press, 2014.
- You Must Look Hard to See What’s There. Portland, Oregon: press-press-pull, 2014.
- Some Mornings. Toronto: Mansfield Press, 2014.
- All and Everything. Mount Pleasant: Laurel Reed Books, 2015.
- Small Waterways. Ottawa: Apt. 9 Press, 2015.
- This Close to Being a Tree. Delhi: Monk Press, 2015.
- Chewing Water. Toronto: Mansfield Press, 2016.
- A Vole on a Roll. With JonArno Lawson. Dundas: Shapes & Sounds Press, 2016.
- You Can’t Make the Sky a Different Blue. Sarnia: Big Pond Rumours Press, 2017.
- Walking with Catherine at Lake Erie. Paris: Rubblestone Press, 2016. [Second edition—Dundas: Shapes & Sounds Press, 2017)
- Certain Details: The Poetry of Nelson Ball. Selected with an Introduction by Stuart Ross. Laurier Poetry Series. Waterloo: Wilfrid Laurier University Press, 2017.
- Walking. Toronto: Mansfield Press, 2017.
- A Letter to Amanda Bernstein and a Checklist of Weed/Flower Press. Ottawa: Apt. 9 Press, 2019.
- 54. [Swedish Translation by Charlotte Jung and Eva Ribich.] Gothenburg, Sweden: Trombone, 2022.
