= Braman =

Braman may refer to:

- Brahman, Hindu concept of The Supreme Reality
- Braman, Oklahoma, U.S.
- Braman (surname)
- Bra Man, a fictional "superhero" from the webcomic Least I Could Do
- Braman, a robot created by Brains from the 1965 Thunderbirds episode called "Sun Probe"

== See also ==
- Brahman (disambiguation)
