= JonArno Lawson =

Canadian writer (born 1968)

- Born: June 11, 1968 (age 58); Hamilton, Ontario
- Citizenship: Canadian and American
- Occupation: Author

JonArno Lawson is a Canadian writer who has published many books for children and adults.

== Personal life ==
Lawson was born in Hamilton, Ontario and raised in nearby Dundas. He now lives in Toronto, Ontario, with his wife and three children.

== Career and education ==
Lawson has a BA in English Literature from McGill University. He also studied briefly at St. John's College (Annapolis/Santa Fe), and at McMaster University in Hamilton, Ontario. He has taught children's poetry in the Master of Arts in Children's Literature Program at Simmons University, Boston, and at University of British Columbia School of Information.

He has been recognized for his nonsense poetry.

== Recognition and awards ==
Lawson has won The Lion and the Unicorn Award for Excellence in North American Poetry four times, in 2007, 2009, 2013, and 2014. The winning books were Enjoy it While it Hurts, A Voweller's Bestiary, Black Stars in a White Night Sky, and Down in the Bottom of the Bottom of the Box. His book The Man in the Moon-Fixer's Mask was a finalist for this award in 2005.

Lawson's wordless picture book Sidewalk Flowers, illustrated by Sydney Smith, won the Governor General's Award For Illustrated Children’s Books in 2015, and was on the New York Times Best Illustrated Books List the same year.

== Published works ==
- Love is an Observant Traveler (Exile Editions, 1997) (illus. Lui Liu)
- Inklings (Exile Editions, 1999)
- The Man in the Moon Fixer's Mask (Pedlar Press, 2004) (illus. Sherwin Tjia)
- Black Stars in a White Night Sky (Pedlar Press, 2006) (illus. Sherwin Tjia)
- A Voweller's Bestiary (Porcupine's Quill, 2008)
- This (And That Was That) (Greenboathouse Press, 2009)
- Think Again (Kids Can Press, 2010) (illus. Julie Morstad)
- There Devil, Eat That (Pedlar Press, 2011)
- Down in the Bottom of the Bottom of the Box (Porcupine's Quill, 2012) (illus. Alec Dempster)
- Old MacDonald Had Her Farm (Annick Press, 2012) (illus. Tina Holdcroft)
- Enjoy it While it Hurts (Wolsak and Wynn, 2013)
- Aloud in My Head (Walker Books Ltd., 2015) (illus. Jonny Hannah)
- Sidewalk Flowers (Groundwood Books, 2015) Sydney Smith
- The Hobo's Crowbar (Porcupine's Quill, 2016) (illus. Alec Dempster)
- I Regret Everything (Espresso Books, 2017)
- Uncle Holland (Groundwood Books, 2017) (illus. Natalie Nelson)
- Leap! (Kids Can Press, 2017) (illus. Josée Bisaillon)
- But It's So Silly: A Cross-cultural Collage of Nonsense, Play, and Poetry (Wolsak and Wynn, 2017)
- Over the Rooftops, Under the Moon (Enchanted Lion Books, 2019) (illus. Nahid Kazemi)
- The Playgrounds of Babel (Groundwood Books, 2019) (illus. Piet Grobler)
- Over the Shop (Candlewick Press, 2021) (illus. Qin Leng)
- A Day for Sandcastles (Candlewick Press, 2022) (illus. Qin Leng)
- Wise Up! Wise Down! (Walker Books, 2024) (a collaboration with John Agard) (illus. Satoshi Kitamura)

== As illustrator ==
- A Vole on a Roll, by Nelson Ball (Shapes and Sounds Press, 2016)

== As contributor ==
- The Chechens: A Handbook (Routledge, 2005) by Amjad Jaimoukha
