= Morley College =

Coordinates: 51.49795°N 0.11019°W

Location
- 61 Westminster Bridge Road; London, SE1 7HT; England

Information
- Type: Further education
- Local authority: Lambeth, Southwark, Kensington and Chelsea
- Principal: Susan Bonett
- Gender: Mixed
- Enrolment: 17,000 (2020)
- Website: www.morleycollege.ac.uk

Morley College is a specialist adult education and further education college in London, England. The college has three main campuses, one in Waterloo on the South Bank, and two in West London namely in North Kensington and in Chelsea, the latter two joining following a merger with Kensington and Chelsea College in 2020. There are also smaller centres part of the college elsewhere. Morley College is also a registered charity under English law. It was originally founded in the 1880s and has a student population of 11,000 adult students (as at 2019). It offers courses in a wide variety of fields, including art and design, fashion, languages, drama, dance, music, health and humanities.

== History ==
=== Morley Memorial College for Working Men and Women ===
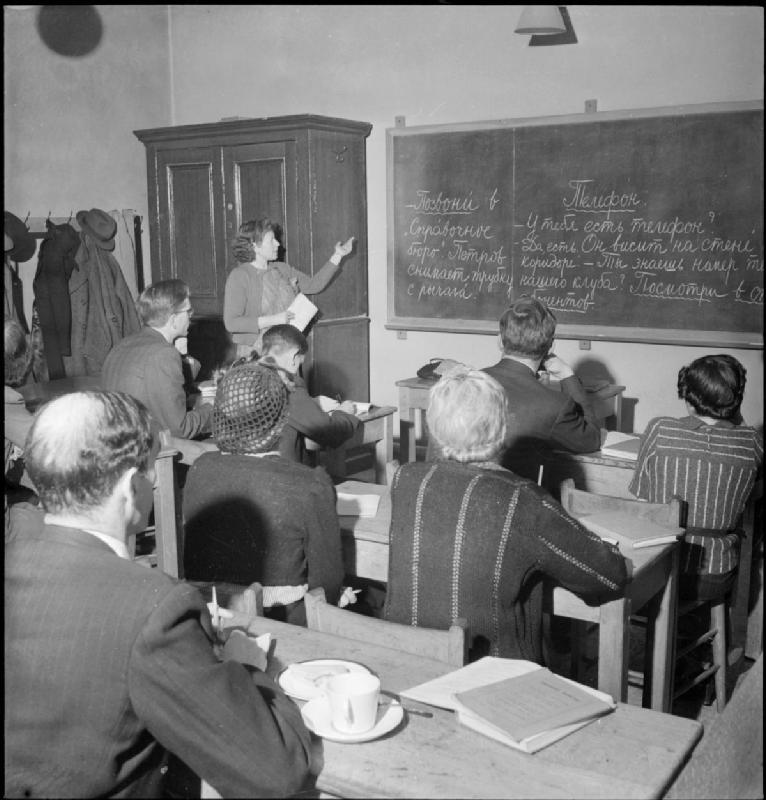
Students at Morley College in 1944

In the early 1880s, philanthropist Emma Cons and her supporters took over the Royal Victoria Hall (the "Old Vic"), a boozy, rowdy home of melodrama, and turned it into the Royal Victoria Coffee and Music Hall to provide inexpensive entertainment "purged of innuendo in word and action". The programme included music-hall turns with opera recitals, temperance meetings, and, from 1882, lectures every Tuesday by eminent scientists.

Local enthusiasm for these "penny lectures" and success in attracting substantial philanthropic funding, led in 1889 to the opening of Morley Memorial College for Working Men and Women. The college was founded by an endowment from Samuel Morley, MP for Nottingham and later Bristol. Samuel Morley is buried at Dr Watts' Walk, Abney Park Cemetery, in Stoke Newington, London.

The college was run separately from the Theatre, but held its classes and student meetings back-stage and in the theatre dressing rooms. The two split in the 1920s, when Emma's niece and successor Lilian Baylis raised funds to acquire a separate site nearby. It attracted some intellectual celebrities such as Virginia Woolf.

Around the same time as the founding of Morley College (c.1880s), concern for the education of working people led to the establishment of other institutions in south London such as the forerunner of the South London Gallery.

The original Victorian college building was extended by Sir Edward Maufe in 1937. The Victorian building was destroyed in the Blitz in 1940 but Maufe's 1930s extension survived. The remains of the Victorian building were cleared and a new college building designed by Charles Cowles-Voysey and Brandon Jones was completed in 1958 and opened by Queen Elizabeth, The Queen Mother. It was decorated with murals by Edward Bawden, John Piper (artist) and Martin Froy. A further bronze curtain-wall extension followed in 1973, designed by John Winter, and another in 1982 clad in corrugated Corten steel, on the eastern side of King Edward's Walk.

=== Sloane School ===
The Sloane School had about 500 boys and was a grammar school on Hortensia Road in Chelsea. The school premises were opened in 1908 as Hortensia Road Secondary School for Girls before evolving in 1919 to Sloane Secondary School for Boys. It was formally designated as Sloane Grammar School following the 1944 Education Act. It was named after Sir Hans Sloane (1660–1753), after whom Sloane Square was named in 1771. The school library was opened on 25 November 1931 by Sir Hugh Walpole. It was administered by London County Council. From 1929 until 1961, the headmaster was Guy Boas (9 December 1896 – 26 March 1966), who encouraged much-acclaimed productions of Shakespeare. The school magazine was The Cheynean.

Sloane School merged in 1970 with the nearby Carlyle School, to become Pimlico Comprehensive School, and Pimlico Academy since 2008. The buildings became Chelsea Secondary School. It then became a part of Kensington and Chelsea College in 1990.

==== Notable alumni ====
- Cyril Aldred (1914–1991), art historian
- Frank Branston (1939–2009), journalist
- Sir Frederick Burden (1905–1987), Conservative MP for Gillingham, 1950–83
- David Caminer (1915–2008), systems analyst; helped design LEO, the world's first business computer
- Spartacus Chetwynd (b. 1973), Turner Prize nominee artist
- John Creasey (1908–1973), writer
- Tony Dyson
- John Fraser, Labour MP for Norwood, 1966–97
- Stephen Greif, actor
- Steve Hackett, musician
- Johnny Harris, actor
- George Innes, actor
- Donald James, born Donald Wheal, author
- Alan Johnson, Labour MP for Kingston upon Hull West and Hessle since 1997
- Rhys Lloyd, Baron Lloyd of Kilgerran, Liberal
- Malcolm Macdonald, footballer
- John Martin-Dye, swimmer at 1960 and 1964 Olympics
- Sir Bernard Miller, chairman of the John Lewis Partnership, 1955–72
- Jeremy Spenser, actor
- Prof Carel Weight CBE (1908–1997), painter and professor of painting at the Royal College of Art, 1957–73

=== Carlyle School ===
This was the analogous female school of the Sloane School, a girls' grammar school, whose former buildings became the Sloane School, having been built in 1908. Its buildings were extended in 1937, being officially opened on 4 February 1938. It had a separate governing body from the Sloane School from 1961. It had around 350 girls.

==== Notable alumni ====
- Linda Bassett, actress
- Mary Harron, Canadian film director; dated Tony Blair, former music critic; screenwriter; directed American Psycho, also co-writing the screenplay, and attended with her sister Martha, both daughters of Don Harron
- Jacqueline Wheldon (1924–1993), author

=== Kensington and Chelsea College ===
Kensington and Chelsea College logo

Kensington and Chelsea College (KCC) was established in 1990, by the Royal Borough of Kensington and Chelsea, from a merger of parts of two former institutions. It initially operated from the former Sloane and Carlyle School buildings in Chelsea (see above) and from centres in North Kensington, South Kensington and Notting Hill, together with an evening class programme in Holland Park School. In 1993, the college became an independent Further Education corporation, following implementation of the Further and Higher Education Act 1992.

The college's first three principals each made a distinctive contribution to its development. Michael Baber, the first principal, laid the foundations for its long-term development. He successfully steered the transition from Local Authority College to freestanding Further Education Corporation, including negotiating freehold ownership of previously shared use sites while developing a strategic partnership with the Local Authority (which included providing its adult education programme and partnership in regeneration projects in North Kensington). Under his leadership the college tripled in size, received a positive inspection report and became the first College in inner London to achieve Investors in People recognition. The college's second Principal, Joanna Gaukroger, was the driving force behind the plan to build a flagship centre at the Chelsea site. part funded by sale of some of the existing College estate. She also used her previous experience as an inspector, to help the college achieve a successful inspection at a time when inspection criteria had become more rigorous, as well as expanding the college's vocational programme. Mike Jutsum, the college's third Principal, added a significant new dimension to its work by securing contracts to provide education in prisons and a young offenders institution in West London. This greatly expanded its educational role while also significantly increasing its income. Although the contract wasn't permanent it provided a valuable financial breathing space at a challenging economic time for Colleges nationally. It was during this period that the new Chelsea Centre, set in motion by his predecessor, was completed. The progress achieved in the college's formative years was clearly due to more than a few individuals, however influential they may have been, i.e. to many managers, lecturers and support staff across the college and over many years. The contribution of lecturers in particular is clear from the inspection reports cited above.

In 2016, the borough announced that it had bought the college's Wornington Campus in North Kensington and planned to redevelop the site for housing, causing widespread opposition from the local community. The Grenfell Tower fire the following year caused further issues, as the building was used by survivors of the deadly fire. Further campaigning and criticism of the council led to their sale of the college campus to the government in 2019, at a loss of £18 million. The college's long-term future was secured in February 2020 when it merged with Morley College. This was part of a deal to secure the future of adult and FE education previously provided by KCC. The KCC campuses turned into Morley College campuses.

== Campuses and facilities ==
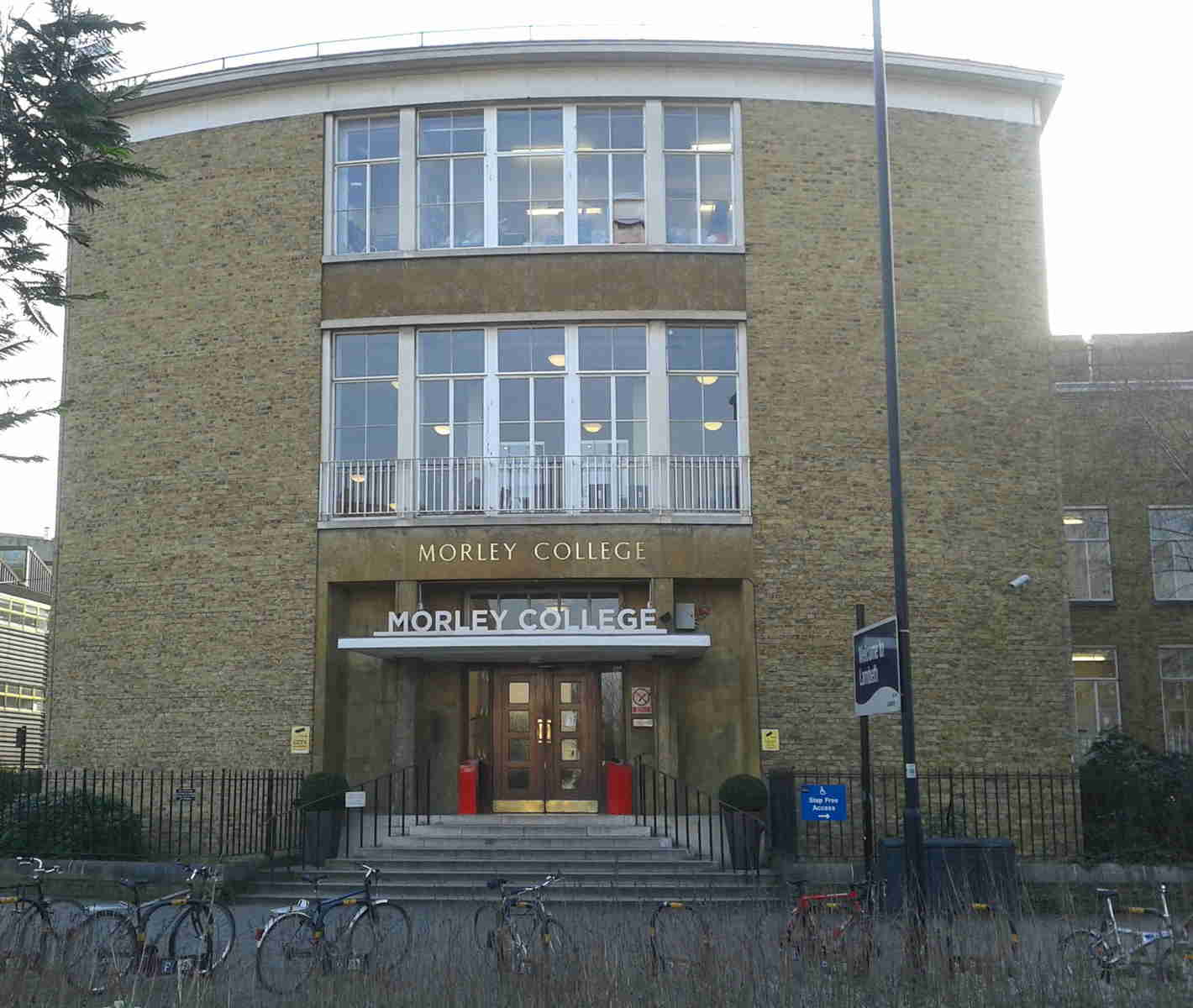
Entrance of main building in Waterloo

The main Morley College campus is located in the Waterloo district of London, on the South Bank. Its buildings occupy sites on either side of the boundary between the London boroughs of Southwark and Lambeth. It sits next to Wellington Mills housing estate. From 2017 to 2019 the college underwent extensive refurbishment to the front entrance of the building, including a new foyer and Morley Radio station. Morley college London began offering courses at the Stockwell Centre in September 2017.

Alongside these are the Chelsea Centre on Hortensia Road in the Chelsea/West Brompton district, and the North Kensington Centre (formerly Wornington Centre) in North Kensington, both becoming part of Morley College after it merged with Kensington and Chelsea college.

A new Stockwell Centre campus of Morley College close to Stockwell tube station opened in 2017.

=== Morley Gallery ===
Morley Gallery opened in 1968 as part of the Arts Centre in Morley College. The Arts Centre, situated in an old pub adjacent to the main College building, has a painting and drawing studio and a print studio on the first, second and third floors. Morley Gallery occupies the whole of the ground floor with six imposing windows facing Westminster Bridge Road and King Edward Walk, London, SE1.

The Gallery shows between eight and twelve exhibitions a year, each exhibition running on average for one month. The annual exhibition programme usually includes exhibitions of painting, printmaking, sculpture, photography, ceramics, textiles, installations, digital and sound art by independent artists and groups. Over the past 40 years many high-profile artists have exhibited in the gallery, including solo exhibitions by Peter Blake Cabinet of Curiosities and several shows by Maggi Hambling including the acclaimed Father.

Morley Gallery is an integral part of college life and there is a strong commitment to exhibit work made by Morley students. For some students, such as Advanced Painting Workshop and Advanced Textile Workshop, exhibiting in the Morley Gallery provides an important part of their academic year.

The Gallery oversees a permanent art collection throughout College. This includes an early painting by Bridget Riley in the foyer, a large painting by John Piper in the Gustav Holst auditorium and portraits of the college's principals painted by Maggi Hambling. Miss Hambling has been a member of the teaching staff at the college since the 1970s.

There is no entrance fee to exhibitions and artists' talks in the gallery are also free of charge.

== Departments ==
=== Music Department ===
Gustav Holst was music director at the college from 1907 to 1924 and its main music room is named after him.

Michael Tippett was director of music at Morley College from 1940 to 1951. His first connection with the college was as conductor of an orchestra of unemployed musicians, who gave the first performance of one of his best loved early works, the Concerto for Double String Orchestra.

Morley Chamber Choir, the Morley Chamber Orchestra, and Morley College Choir are established music groups within the college.

==== Notable staff members ====
- Stella Browne
- Cornelius Cardew
- Rupert Doone
- Margaret Drabble
- Martino Tirimo
- John Gardner
- Walter Goehr
- Michael Graubart
- Lily Greenham
- Gustav Holst
- Shea Lolin
- Anthony Milner
- Daphne Oram
- Amber Reeves
- Mátyás Seiber
- Dorothy Strutt
- Angus Suttie
- Michael Tippett
- Ralph Vaughan Williams
- Virginia Woolf

=== Drama Department ===
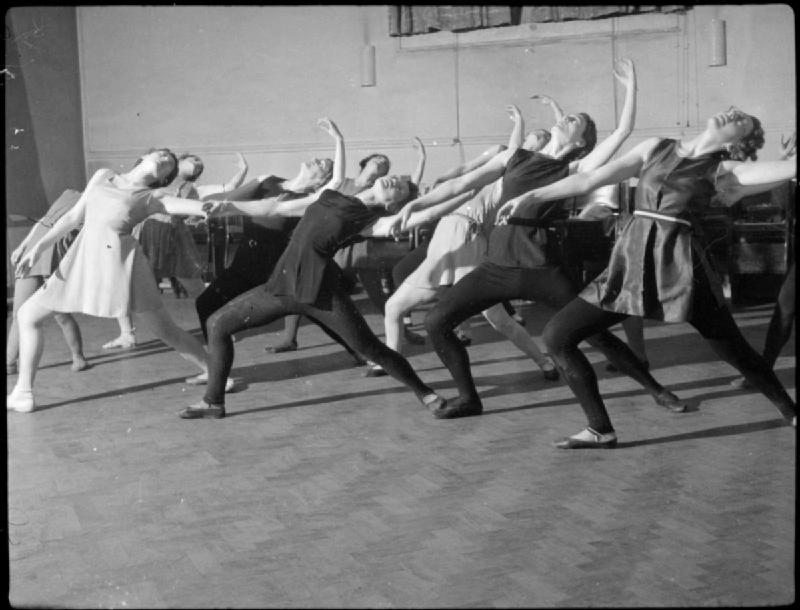
A classical dance class at Morley College in 1944

The Drama department began in the rehearsal rooms of the Old Vic Theatre. Classes continued to be held there as recently as 2004, although most drama classes are now held in the main building at Westminster Bridge Road.

The college was the scene of early experiments in Improv Theatre when Keith Johnstone brought his troupe from the Royal Court Theatre Studio (later to become the Theatre Machine) to demonstrate his ideas to his Contemporary Theatre class. (source "Impro" ISBN 0-413-46430-X)

Courses have included Absolute Beginners Acting, more advanced classes, leading to a year-long auditioned Acting Studio course from which students were expected to go on and write, direct and produce their own theatre.

The department also combined with the education department of Shakespeare's Globe Theatre to teach the "Groundlings on Stage" course.

The Theatre School enjoyed success during the 1980s and early 1990s under the direction of Paul A Thompson (who was resident dramatist with the Royal Shakespeare Company in 1977 and with the National Theatre 1977 to 1979) and Brian Croucher (who played a number of roles in TV shows including EastEnders, Blake's 7, Doctor Who, The Bill, Casualty, Doctors and Edge of Darkness).

The Acting Studio was particularly prolific under the tutelage of Craig Snelling, from 1993 to 2005, during which at least a dozen theatre companies were formed which went on to produce plays in various theatres at London Fringe venues.

Companies producing plays in 2005 included: Short and Girlie, Bedlamb, Twice as Loud, Mulabanda Productions, and Acting the Goat.

==== Notable staff members ====
- John Cox
- Brian Croucher
- Gustav Holst
- Ewan Hooper
- Keith Johnstone
- Cornelius Cardew
- Maggie Hambling
- Virginia Woolf

==== Notable alumni ====
- Geoff Bell
- Johnny Harris
- Abi Titmuss

=== Art and Design Department ===
Morley has specialist art and design studios for ceramics, digital design, fashion design and clothes making, jewellery, sculpture, and printmaking.

Clubs & Societies

Morley also hosts a number of clubs and societies who hold regular meetings at its Waterloo Road site. There is a chess club and Morley Medieval Society.
