= Ditch, =

Online literary magazine

ditch, was an on-line literary periodical edited by the Canadian writer John C. Goodman with assistance from Scottish poet and artist James Mc Laughlin. The magazine was launched in August 2007 and closed in January 2014. The closure was due to technical problems - the website platform was not robust enough to handle the special formatting required for much of the poetry resulting in frequent crashes.

ditch, published poetry only. Although the work of experimental poets from all over the world was accepted, the magazine was designed to promote Canadian experimental poetry which, at the time of the magazine's inception, had a very poor presence on the Internet.

Most of the material was original to the magazine although ditch, also published a number of book excerpts. Each post was accompanied by a short biography and a picture of the writer.

ditch, published many of Canada's more prominent innovative poets such as Erín Moure, Nathalie Stephens, David UU (David W. Harris), Daniel f. Bradley, Judith Copithorne, derek beaulieu, Camille Martin, Natalie Zina Walschots, rob mclennan, A. Rawlings, Lynn Crosbie, Margaret Christakos, Elizabeth Bachinsky, and many others.

ditch, also published two online anthologies of Canadian innovative poetry which Ron Silliman called "the most ambitious books yet published in the Issuu format".

Paul Vermeersch included ditch, in "Four Online Canadian Literary Journals You Should Know About" on Open Book Toronto.

In Sensitive Skin Magazine, Mark McCawley called ditch, one of the "online magazines presently pushing back against the literary status quo in Canada".

Michael A. Chaney, Associate Professor and Vice Chair of the English Department, Dartmouth College listed ditch, as one of the Top Ten Literary Magazines to submit to.
