= András Petőcz =

Hungarian writer and poet (born 1959)

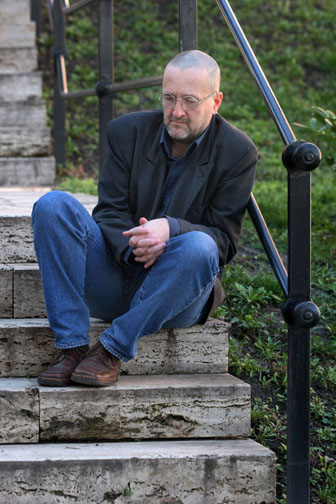
András Petőcz

András Petőcz (born August 27, 1959, in Budapest) is a Hungarian writer and poet.

== Life ==
Petőcz began his career in literary life in 1981. He was the chief editor for over two years of the art periodical Jelenlét (Presence), which was published by the Faculty of Humanities at the Eötvös Loránd University of Sciences in Budapest, and soon became a significant forum on contemporary literature. He graduated from Eötvös Loránd University of Sciences in 1986 where he studied Hungarian Literature and Language-History.

After obtaining his degree he was an assistant at Gorkii State Library for a short time, and then worked as an editor for longer and shorter periods on literary magazines. Since then he has been working as a professional writer.

Petőcz has taken part in several international literary and art festivals, e.g. in Paris (1986), in Tarascon (France, 1988), in Marseille (1995). He has been working as a university and college lecturer for seven years.

== Work ==
=== Poetry ===
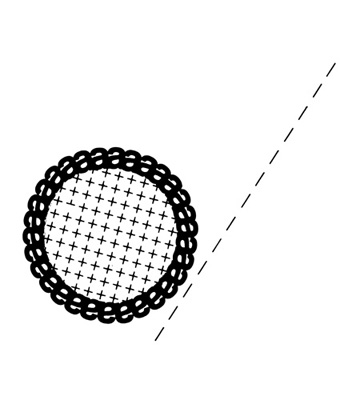
András Petőcz: Letter "A" (concrete poem, 1989)

Petőcz has published around 25 books, including poems for adults and children, essays, fiction and reviews. Petőcz poetry volumes include the book A tenger dícsérete (1994, ISBN 963-7971-51-3), and the poetry collections Meduza (2000, ISBN 963-9048-83-6) and A napsütötte sávban (2001, ISBN 963-9243-32-9). He also published a "collected poems book" under the title Majdnem minden (Almost everything, 2002, ISBN 963-9243-56-6).

He also edited several volumes of avant-garde literature and worked as organizer for a variety of events showcasing experimental literature. He also was the editor of "Medium Art", a Selection of Hungarian Experimental Poetry. In the eighties he was one of the "leaders" of Hungarian avant-garde poetry, having begun to work on sound poetry during the period. His visual and concrete poetry is well known. Béla Vilcsek writes about his poetry: "Legends and extremes accompany András Petőcz on his home ground. He always has a dichotomy, either wanting to pay respects to classicism or to modernity, conservatism or avant-garde, sonnet or free verse, tradition or the new. In his mid-thirties, he already commands an authoritative reputation with his life-work, in both its quantity and quality. There are few writers like this among those in his field."

=== Prose ===
The more than six prose books András Petőcz has published contain essays and reviews such as Idegenként, Európában (As a Stranger in Europe, 1997, ISBN 963-9101-02-8), a series of short stories called Egykor volt házibarátaink (Once We Had House Friends, Chapters from a Family Saga, 2002, ISBN 963-547-632-9), and two novels A születésnap (The Birthday, 2006, ISBN 963-9651-20-6) and Idegenek (Strangers, 2007, ISBN 978-963-9651-54-8).

==== The Birthday ====
The Birthday is a novel that tells a family story spanning 30 years. Tony the little boy narrator is special in that he does not get older. He remains a child as he looks at events around him. Everyone is preparing for the birthday of the head of the family while they look at the Big Photo Album. The 30 years of the novel brings to life what happened from the early sixties to the nineties, how people lived in Central Europe and refers to the change of system in Hungary in 1989. The little boy narrator, still waiting in vain for his father at the beginning of the celebrations, becomes a man due to his missing father and his memories. He tells the family stories "in one breath" using spoken expressions and personal remarks.

Károly D. Balla writes about A születésnap: “The author, who is himself on the threshold of dreams, redeems historical and family tragedies with angelic good humour, and what might make an adult grumpy and ill is rendered tolerable by the imagination of childhood memories and the genuineness of the hope in them.”

==== Strangers ====
In this novel, an eight-year-old girl learns to lie in order to survive. It is not clear exactly where and when Strangers takes place. Somewhere in Europe, or the edges of Europe, but it could be somewhere in America or Asia. Perhaps in the 20th century, but it could be the first decade of the 21st century. As the subtitle says, the story takes place "thirty minutes before the war". The little girl maintains human values even in a world of terror and oppression. Terrible things happen to small children on a daily basis. Across the border is the free world where there are no soldiers in charge, where you can travel freely. The free world might be reached through a rat infested tunnel. The novel deals with events that have already taken place in the 21st century and turns concrete events into fiction. It elaborates the terrorist atrocity of Beslan in Russia.

György C. Kálmán writes about Idegenek: “In the world of the novel – it is difficult to interpret Petőcz’s work any other way – everyone is an outsider. As they are in the outside world (suggests the novel). For in this world (in the novel and outside) the fact of being an outsider means to be vulnerable to a deadly threat (or is itself a threat), it means oppression, helplessness and determined opposition. Being an outsider is not just about a different use of language (or using a different language), clothes, skin colour or customs, but is embodied primarily in oppression and power – wherever the outsider may be. To be more precise, the defenceless and those in power are both outsiders for each other, and no matter who is in either position, for everyone else too.”

== Prizes ==
Petőcz has received numerous literary prizes and awards for his work in literature, including the Lajos Kassák Literary Prize in 1987, which he received for his experimental poetry from the distinguished avantgarde literary journal Magyar Műhely (Hungarian Workshop).

Petőcz's poem "Európa metaforája" (Europe, metaphorically) won the Robert Graves Prize for best Hungarian poem of the year 1990.

In 1996 Petőcz was awarded the Attila József Prize by the cultural part of the Hungarian government as an official recognition of his work to date.

He is also a UNESCO-Aschberg Laureate, having been granted a bursary in 2006 for the residency program at CAMAC (Centre d’Art. Marnay Art Centre) in Marnay-sur-Seine. to write a new novel.

In 2008 he received the Sándor Márai Prize awarded by the Hungarian Ministry of Education and Culture, for his novel Idegenek (Strangers).

In 2017 he was awarded the Laureate of the Hungarian Republic for his poetic and artistic oeuvre.

In 2021 Petőcz was awarded the IPTRC Prize by the INTERNATIONAL POETRY TRANSLATION AND RESEARCH CENTRE and the GREEK ACADEMY OF ARTS AND LETTERS and THE JOURNAL OF RENDITION OF INTERNATIONAL POETRY [Multilingual] as an official international recognition of his poetry.

== Participations ==
András Petőcz has been to numerous writers’ residences and has been a guest at numerous international writers' meetings. He spent three months in the United States in 1998, where he took part in an international writers’ seminar within the framework of the International Writing Program (IWP) in Iowa City. While there, he took part in events with about 25 writers from all over the world, including Israeli prose writer Igal Sarna and the brasilien writer Bernardo Carvalho.

From the IWP invitation, Petőcz contributed to several readings, including in New York, San Francisco and Portland, Maine. Similarly, he spent a month in 2001 at the Yaddo Art Center in Saratoga Springs, New York, where, among others, he met Rick Moody, the American prose writer.

In 2002 he moved to Lille, France, for four years with his family and contributed to the work of the French journal and literary circle Hauteurs.

Starting in January 2007, he spent three months at CAMAC and introduced his new novel Idegenek (Strangers) in French. In August 2007, he was invited to Switzerland by the Ledig-Rowohlt Foundation and spent three weeks at the Château de Lavigny International Writers' Residence.

In September 2011, he was invited to the International Literaturfestival Berlin, and also introduced his novel Idegenek (Strangers) in German.

In May 2013, he participated in the "Biennale International des poetes en Val-de-Marne" in France, and introduced his poemes in French. Starting in June 2013 he spent two months at Villa Yourcenar Residency, and participated in the artistic life of the Villa.

Starting in October 2022 he spent one months at Residências Internacionais de Escrita Fundação Dom Luís I, and worked on his new novel, and talked about his poetry.

In February 2023, he spent one month in Austria, in Krems, at the residence "Literaturhaus Niederösterreich", and worked on his new poetry book, and talked about his works in the Collegium Hungaricum in Vienna.

In May 2026, he participated at the Vienna Poetry Festival "Literarischer Lenz in Centrope", where his poems were read in Hungarian and German

== Notes ==
a: Petőcz writes about Medium Art: "Medium Art makes use of the 'mediatory' meaning of the word in the sense that it tries to give a publicity to an artistic-literary genre that deals mainly with the image rather than the music of verbalism. The visual-visible verbal poetry is the most basic form of communication, using the elements of the spoken language, letters, words and other written marks and also examines their changes and developments and visualsurplus in meaning (...) This anthology takes note of such publications as the 1967 An Anthology of Concrete Poetry (edited by Emmett Williams), the Anthologie Vizuele Poezie of 1975 published in the Netherlands, the Konkretna, vizuelna is signalisticka poezija published in the same year in Yugoslavia"
b: A tenger dícsérete was also published in English as In Praise of the Sea (1999, ISBN 963-9101-51-6), translated by Jascha Kessler, István Totfalusi, and Jason Vincz
c: The Robert Graves Prize is named after the English writer Robert Graves, who is very renowned in Hungary.
d: A napsütötte sávban was also published by Corvina in English as in a row of sunlight (2008, ISBN 963-13-5692-2), translated by Nathaniel Barratt

- Kálmán, György C. (1997), written at Budapest, "Hepiend nincs?", [Elet es Irodalom], Hungary: Irodalom Kft, ISSN 0424-8848
- Petőcz and a part of his novel "Idegenek" in the Jewish newspaper "Szombat" (Saturday)
- The International Authors and Writers Who's Who, Editor: M.J. Shields, FIInfSc, MITI, Cambridge, England, 1993 ISBN 0-948875-51-8
- 1998: The International Writing Program (András Petőcz)
- Béla Vilcsek: Andras Petőcz, monograph, published by Kalligram, 2001, ISBN 80-7149-427-5
- Petőcz's Biography on the homepage of Belletrist Association (in Hungarian)
- Petőcz's interview about the novel "Idegenek" (Strangers) on the homepage of the Hungarian Cultural Ministry (in Hungarian)
- Petőcz's interview in the Hungarian political weekly "168 óra" about what it means to be a "stranger" (in Hungarian)
- Petőcz's biography and works (audio) on the homepage of the Museum of Literature in Budapest.
- Petõcz, András (Autumn 1997), written at Budapest, "A Change of Guard in Writing: Notes on the Poetry of the 1980s", [the Hungarian Quarterly], vol. 38, no. 147, Hungary: the Society of the Hungarian Quarterly, p. 39, ISSN 0028-5390, archived from the original on 2008-11-17
- Új magyar irodalmi lexikon (New Hungarian Literary Encyclopedia), editor: Laszlo Peter, published by Akadémiai Kiadó, Budapest, 1994. ISBN 963-05-6804-7 .
- Medium-Art, Selection of Hungarian Experimental Poetry, editors Zoltan Frater and Andras Petőcz, published by Magvető, 1990, Budapest, ISBN 963-14-1680-1
- András Petőcz - László Sary: Közeledések és távolodások - Approaching and Departing, Sound poetry record/disc, published by Hungaroton, 1990, SLPX 31392, 2009, HCD 31392 https://web.archive.org/web/20071130000631/http://www.camac.org/ver2/proto/residences_petocz_andras.htm
- András Petőcz's poems and biography in English: The Maecenas Anthology of Living Hungarian Poetry, editor: István Tótfalusi, published by Maecenas Könyvek, Budapest, 1997, ISBN 963-9025-28-3
- András Petőcz's poems and biography in English: In Quest of the Miracle Stag: The Poetry of Hungary, editor: Adam Makkai, published by The International Association of Hungarian Language and Culture, Budapest, 2003, ISBN 963-210-814-0
