= Dorothy Strutt =

English singer and musician

Dorothy Ada Lucy "Dal" Strutt (18 May 1941 – 14 June 2019) was an English cellist, pianist, singer, violinist, and self-taught composer. Strutt has also worked under the name Dorian Carl Munday.

Strutt was born in Essex. Strutt has studied cello, piano, violin, and voice from childhood but has no formal training in composition. Strutt is a professional musician who has worked as a pianist for Moreley College Music Theatre, as a member of the Barnard-Strutt-Owen trio, and in a multimedia trio with Malcolm Dedman and Martin Vishnick. Strutt gave recitals and lectures in public schools. Strutt served as a director of the Buddhist Society in London from 2006 to 2009 and has served as conductor of the London Gay Men's Choir.

Strutt's music is published by the British Music Collection (today known as Sound and Music) and is available through the Edwin A. Fleisher Collection of Orchestral Music at the Free Library of Philadelphia. Biographical information, scores and recordings of Strutt's work are held in Heritage Quay https://heritagequay.org/archives/?author=Strutt the archive of the University of Huddersfield, as part of the British Music Collection archive. Dal Strutt's compositions include:

== Chamber ==
- Quartet on Haiku (flute, clarinet, guitar and violin; text by Charles Ford)
- Sonata (oboe and clarinet)
- Three Haiku (clarinet and cello)

== Dance ==
- Circle (three dancers and piano)
- Words at Castlerigg (dancers and cello)

== Orchestra ==
- Sinfonia

== Organ/Piano ==
- Lumen de Lumine (organ)
- Sonata on Six (piano)
- Sonorities (piano)
- Wilderness (organ)

== Theatre ==
- External Mind

== Vocal ==
- "A Flower was Offered Me" (text by William Blake)
