= The Mercury Press =

Canadian publisher

The Mercury Press is a Canadian publishing company which publishes literary fiction, poetry, and non-fiction works by Canadians. Mercury has a substantial jazz list and has also published murder mysteries. Books published by Mercury have won or been shortlisted for awards including The Governor General's Award, The City of Toronto Book Award, and the Trillium Award.

== History ==
In 1978, Glynn Davies founded the Aya Press, first publishing Ancient Music by Itzy Borstein. Over its eleven-year lifespan, the Aya Press published the work of experimental poets and culturally significant fiction. On January 1, 1990, the Aya Press changed its name to The Mercury Press, meaning "messenger" or "signpost."

== Funding ==
The Mercury Press is funded by contributions from the Canadian Council For the Arts, the Ontario Arts Council, the Ontario Media Development Corporation's Book Fund, and the Ontario Book Publishing Tax Credit Program. It also receives funding from the Government of Canada through the Department of Canadian Heritage's Book Publishing Industry Development Program.

== Notable authors ==
- Nelson Ball
- Barbara Caruso
- Jack Chambers
- Kenneth J. Harvey
- Roy Miki
- Mark Miller
- bpNichol
- Douglas Ord
- John Riddell
- Gerry Shikatani
- Lola Lemire Tostevin
- Richard Truhlar
