= Sherwin Tjia =

Canadian artist and medical illustrator

- Born: Scarborough, Ontario, Canada
- Other name: Sherwin Sullivan Tjia
- Occupations: Artist, and medical illustrator

Sherwin Tjia is a Canadian artist and medical illustrator.

He is the author of several graphic novels. His latest Plummet was listed on the CBC's list of recommended winter reads, for 2020.

According to The Globe and Mail in 2010, Tjia was known as the creator of Toronto's strip spelling bee scene. In strip spelling bees players who spell words wrong have to start removing some of their clothes, accompanied by burlesque strip-tease music. In 2014 the New York Daily News described how Tjia introduced porn karaoke to the New York area. In porn karaoke small teams have to improvise dialogue sung over silent clips of pornography.

The premise of Plummet is that his protagonist is in a constant state of freefall.

== Publications ==
- Sherwin Tjia (2005). The World is a Heartbreaker. Coach House Books. ISBN 9781552451533.
- Sherwin Tjia (2009). Pedigree Girls. Insomniac Press. ISBN 9781897415917.
- Sherwin Tjia (2011). You Are a Kitten!. Conundrum Press. ISBN 9781894994972.
- Sherwin Tjia (2011). You Are a Cat!. Conundrum Press. ISBN 9781894994569.
- Sherwin Tjia (2012). Serial Villain. Conundrum Press. ISBN 9781894994675.
- Sherwin Tjia (2013). You Are a Cat in the Zombie Apocalypse!. Conundrum Press. ISBN 9781894994774.
- Sherwin Tjia (2001). Gentle Fictions. Insomniac Press. ISBN 9781894663137.
- Sherwin Tjia (2019). Plummet. Conundrum Press. ISBN 9781772620405.
