= Steve McCaffery =

Canadian poet and scholar

Stephen McCaffery (born January 24, 1947) is a Canadian poet and scholar who was a professor at York University. He held the David Gray Chair at the University at Buffalo, The State University of New York. McCaffery was born in Sheffield, England and lived in the UK for most of his youth attending University of Hull.

He moved to Toronto in 1968. In 1970, he began to collaborate with fellow poets Rafael Barreto-Rivera, Paul Dutton, and bpNichol, forming the sound-poetry group, The Four Horsemen. Some of McCaffery's poetry attempts to break language from the logic of syntax and structure to create a purely emotional response. He has created three-dimensional structures of words and has released a number of sound and video works, often in collaboration with other poets.

== Bibliography ==
- Carnival – 1967–1975
- postmark canadada – 1970
- Ground Plans for a Speaking City - 1970
- Transitions To The Beast – 1970
- Maps – 1971
- Collaborations (with bpNichol) – 1972
- Broken Mandala – 1974
- Dr. Sadhu's Muffins – 1974
- Ow's Waif – 1975
- from The Abstract Ruin – 1976
- Shifters – 1976
- The Story So Four (edited with bpNichol)
- Crown's Creek (with Steven Smith) – 1978
- Research on the Mouth – 1978 (cassette)
- Wot We Wukkers Want – 1978 (cassette)
- Sound Poetry: A Catalogue (edited with bpNichol) – 1978; reprinted 2010
- Intimate Distortions – 1979
- In England Nw That Spring (with bpNichol) – 1979; reprinted 1984
- Canadian Pataphysics (edited with bpNichol) – 1980; reprinted 2000
- The Perseus Project: Paleogorgonization and the Sexual Life of Fossils – 1981
- Manicured Noise (with Richard Truhlar) – 1981 (cassette)
- Avoiding the Beautiful (with Whitney Smith) – 1982
- Knowledge Never Knew – 1983
- Panopticon – 1984
- North of Intention: Critical Writings 1973–1986 – 1986
- Evoba – 1987
- The Black Debt – 1989
- Theory of Sediment – 1991 (nominated for a Governor General's Award)
- McCaffery, Steve & bpNichol (1992). Rational geomancy : the kids of the book-machine : the collected research reports of the Toronto Research Group, 1973-1982. Vancouver: Talonbooks.
- The Cheat of Words – 1996
- Seven Pages Missing – 2000 (nominated for a Governor General's Award)
- Imagining Language (edited with Jed Rasula) – 2001
- Prior to Meaning: The Protosematic and Poetics – 2001
- The Basho Variations – 2007
- Language to Cover a Wall (edited with Michael Basinski & Karen Mac Cormack) – 2011
- Tatterdemalion: A Sketch-Book for Syntax - 2014
- Parsival - 2015
- Dark Ladies: A Mennipean masque and user's guide to the tragi-comic incorporating a new philosophy of the joke - 2016
- Pataphonix: Selected Sound Poems - 2019 (CD)
- Carnival: The Complete Edition - 2021

=== with Four Horsemen (Rafael Barreto-Rivera, Paul Dutton, Steve McCaffery, bpNichol) ===
- Nada Canadada – 1972 (vinyl LP); reïssued 1977 (cassette); reïssued 2018 (vinyl LP)
- Horse d'Oeuvres - 1975 (book)
- Live In The West – 1977 (vinyl LP)
- A Little Nastiness – 1980 (book)
- Bootleg – 1981 (cassette)
- The Prose Tattoo – 1983 (book)
- 2 Nights – 1988 (cassette)

=== Critical studies and reviews of McCaffery's work ===
Rational geomancy

- Mann, Paul (Spring 1994). "A poetics of its own occasion". Contemporary Literature. 35 (1): 171–181. doi:10.2307/1208741. JSTOR 1208741.

== See also ==
- Canadian literature
- Canadian poetry
- List of Canadian poets
