= Rena Pfiffer-Lax =

Polish opera singer

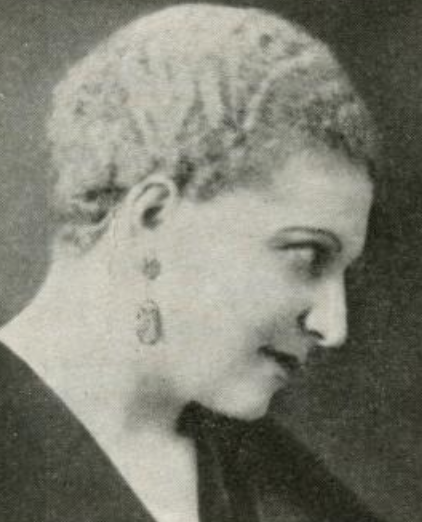
- Rena Pfiffer-Lax, from a 1927 publication
- Born: October 5, 1893; Przemyśl
- Died: October 8, 1943 (age 50); Copenhagen, Denmark
- Other name: Rena Pfiffer-Madsen
- Occupation: Soprano opera singer
- Spouse(s): Gabriel Lax, Jens Egon Christian Madsen
- Children: Lily Greenham

Rena Pfiffer-Lax-Madsen (October 5, 1893 – October 8, 1943), usually seen as Rena Pfiffer-Lax, was a Polish soprano opera singer based in Austria and Denmark, and associated with Viennese opera houses in the 1920s.

== Early life and education ==
Rena Pfiffer was born in Przemyśl, now in south east Poland, to Polish-Jewish parents. She trained as a singer in Lviv and Vienna, with Edmund Walter and Gustav Geiringer.

== Career ==
Pfiffer joined the Vienna Volksoper in 1919. She gave performances in Dresden, Sofia, Lviv, Warsaw, and Budapest. The New York Times described her voice in 1927 as "lyric, of pleasing timbre, not as flexible as a coloratura, but her instincts are highly dramatic and she sings in a spirited manner." Performances by Pfiffer included roles in Meyerbeer's Robert le diable (Vienna, 1921), and Mozart's Die Entführung aus dem Serail (Vienna, 1918).

In 1927 Pfiffer traveled to the United States, where she gave a recital at Aeolian Hall in New York, accompanied by Canadian composer Colin McPhee. She made six recordings on the Brunswick label, including two duets with fellow soprano Lyubov Karina.

Later in her career, Pfiffer gave radio performances, wrote concert reviews, and taught voice in Denmark; her students included soprano Inger Lis Hassing and composer Benna Moe. She traveled to Palestine in 1939, to give concerts and radio performances.

== Personal life and death ==
Pfiffer married twice. Her first husband was businessman Gabriel Lax; they had a daughter, Lilijana, who became an international visual artist, performer and composer. Her second husband was Danish singer Jens Egon Christian Madsen. She died at a hospital in Copenhagen, Denmark, in 1943 at the age of 50, from wounds sustained while trying to escape to Sweden during the Nazi occupation. "Rena Pfiffer-Madsen is by far the most well-known person to have died during the Judenaktion," notes historian Silvia Goldbaum Tarabini Fracapane in a recent book. The Danish gunman who shot her was convicted in 1949 and served almost five years in prison.
