= Lily Greenham =

Austrian-born Danish visual artist, performer, composer, sound poet

- Born: Lily Henriette Lax; January 4, 1924; Vienna, Austria
- Died: October 31, 2001 (age 77); London, England
- Other names: Lilijana Laxówna, Lily Lax, Lily Pfiffer-Madsen
- Occupations: operatic singer, visual artist, performer, sound poet, composer
- Years active: 1947-1995
- Known for: sound poetry, concrete poetry, ‘Lingual Music’
- Spouse(s): Peter Greenham (m. 1951; div. 1964)
- Children: none
- Parent(s): Dr. Gabriel Lax, Rena Pfiffer-Lax

Lily Henriette Greenham (4 January 1924 - 31 October 2001) was an Austrian-born Danish visual artist, performer, composer and leading proponent of sound poetry and concrete poetry.

== Early life ==
=== Vienna ===
Greenham was born in Vienna, Austria, on January 4, 1924, the only child of Rena Pfiffer-Lax and Dr. Gabriel Lax, both of Polish/Ukrainian-Jewish descent. Her mother was a well-known soprano opera singer from Przemyśl who performed at the Vienna Volksoper, Vienna State Opera, and various international venues during the 1920s and ‘30s. Her father was a lawyer, impresario and former police commissioner from Berezhany. Her parents divorced in 1929 and her mother later remarried to Danish singer Egon Madsen in Copenhagen in 1933. Lily was a pupil at the progressive Rahlgasse School in Vienna until April 1938, whose alumni also include philologist Gertrud Herzog-Hauser, actress and journalist Lina Loos, fashion designer (and life partner of Gustav Klimt) Emilie Louise Flöge, and nuclear physicist Marietta Blau.

=== Escape to Denmark ===
In April 1938 her father was amongst the first wave of prominent Jewish citizens arrested in Vienna and transported to Dachau concentration camp, following the annexation of Austria into the German Reich. Greenham escaped to Copenhagen to be reunited with her mother thanks to the efforts of her step-father who obtained an exit visa for her. At fifteen Greenham's mother started giving her formal singing lessons and she learnt a repertoire of lieder and operatic arias. Madsen later secured the release of Greenham's father from Buchenwald concentration camp in November 1938. Her father travelled on to Shanghai to work as a journalist, where as many as 20,000 German, Austrian and Polish Jews sought refuge during World War Two. He died there in April 1944.

=== Escape to Sweden ===
Following the German occupation of Denmark in 1940, Greenham's mother attempted to escape to Sweden in October 1943 with a group of Danish Jews. A 'Kripo' (Kriminalpolizei) patrol discovered them and Greenham's mother was shot in the stomach and died of her wounds a few days later. According to Egon Madsen's memoirs, Greenham had affected her own dramatic escape by boat to Sweden, hiding in ditches and a church attic to escape Nazi patrols.

=== Post-war ===
After the war Greenham (appearing as Lily Pfiffer-Madsen) and her step-father toured and performed together in Sweden and Denmark, including a 1947 Danish radio broadcast where they performed pieces by Georges Bizet, Franz Lehár and Anton Rubinstein. In 1948 Greenham moved to Paris to study painting, subsequently married poet Peter Greenham in Hendon, London in 1951, before returning to Austria with him in 1952 to study at the Academy of Music and Performing Arts in Vienna. She and Peter Greenham divorced in 1964.

== Career and adult life ==
=== Vienna and sound poetry ===
Whilst studying in Vienna in the 1950s, Greenham developed a strong interest in contemporary art and became involved with the activities of the Wiener Gruppe (Vienna Group), an avant-garde constellation of Austrian poets and writers that included H. C. Artmann and Gerhard Rühm. She became well known for radio broadcasts and performances of sound & concrete poetry by many writers, poets and artists, including Freidrich Achtleitner, Elena Asins, Alain Arias-Misson, Ronaldo Azeredo, Bob Cobbing, Peter Greenham, Helmut Heißenbüttel and Ernst Jandl. Greenham spoke several languages aside from her native German and adopted Danish, as evidenced in her BBC Radio 3 Sound Poetry Concert in 1970 where she delivered sound poems in their original Spanish, French and English.

=== Paris and visual art exhibitions ===
In 1964 Greenham had moved back to Paris where she joined the Groupe de Recherche d'Art Visuel (GRAV) (Research Group for Visual Art) of opto-kinetic artists, part of the broader Nouvelle Tendance (New Tendency) art movement. Greenham's innovative Op art works became widely recognised and were shown in several major exhibitions, including Mouvement 2 (Galerie Denise René, Paris, 1964), The Responsive Eye (Museum of Modern Art (MoMa), New York, 1965), Light and Movement (Museum of Modern Art, Paris, 1967), Formas computables (Computer Centre, University of Madrid, 1969) and the 35th Venice Biennale in 1970.

=== London and 'lingual music' ===
Greenham moved to London in 1972, where she based herself for the remainder of her life, and began to focus on her own sound poetry experiments. She consciously distanced herself from being regarded as merely an interpreter of other people's poetry, particularly as one of the few female practitioners in an overwhelmingly male-dominated field. Her sense of being an outsider was something she wrote about in Un Arte de Vivir (An Art of Living), originally published in the Spanish literary magazine Inventario 5 (1995).

When I was heavily involved in one of the disciplines I actively pursued, I identified with certain professional groups for a time, but I was never exclusively dedicated to any single discipline. Others also seemed to recognize this, because in the field of music I was often described as a painter, in the visual arts I was seen as a poet, in literary circles I was a performer and so forth… Neither nationality nor religion nor profession, nor any sort of classification covers my own concept of myself. Categories don’t fit my character, nor my soul. I am a stranger in a strange land.

Greenham coined the term ‘lingual music’ in 1973 to describe her experiments with layering and processing reel-to-reel tape recordings of her own voice. She explained her approach in the catalogue for the exhibition Tekst in geluid (Text in sound) at the Stedelijk Museum, Amsterdam, in 1977.

The main feature of these tape pieces is the use of speech as a basic element. Contrary to the traditional way of ‘setting words to music', in ‘lingual music’ speech ‘emerges as music’. ‘Lingual music’ pieces could not be performed live. The only sound source used is the human voice (if not otherwise stated). The recorded material is electronically processed and the result leaves the listener at times in doubt whether he is listening to ‘electronic music’ or the human voice.

=== Composing and performing ===
In 1974 she worked at the BBC Radiophonic Workshop to realise Relativity, using words from Einstein's Special Theory of Relativity and playing on the linkage between the word electron as used in both physics and electronic music. Under Greenham's detailed direction, Relativity involved the considerable engineering, editing and mixing skills of Paddy Kingsland, Peter Howell and Richard Yeoman-Clark and was broadcast on the BBC the following year, though being somewhat short for the designated radio spot (at just over 8 minutes) the piece was actually broadcast twice in succession with a short link spoken by broadcaster Richard Baker dropped into the gap. Relativity went on to win a prize for electro-acoustic music at the prestigious 5th Bourges International Festival of Experimental Music in 1975. That same year she worked with the mercurial Hugh Davies in the Electronic Music Studios at Goldsmiths, University of London, to create the piece Traffic. On Circulation (1975/6), a stereo French-language version of her poem Traffic, Greenham explored early digital sampling techniques - long before the availability of commercial samplers - using a PDP-8 computer at University College in Cardiff with software created by programmer Marcus West.

Greenham continued to perform live across Europe, North Africa and North America throughout the 1970s and into the 1980s, with free improvisation performances alongside Danish saxophonist John Tchicai and the Bob Downes Open Music Trio. In 1976 she toured in Holland with Hugh Davies and Peter Cusack. Greenham again featured at the Bourges International Festival of Experimental Music in 1978, where 7 Consonants in Space, Traffic, and Circulation were performed.

Alongside her own work, Greenham was involved in many performances of contemporary music during the 1960s and '70s, providing voice and other parts for works by George Brecht, John Cage, Cornelius Cardew, Dieter Schnebel, Edgard Varèse and La Monte Young. One example was 'Materiels pour Monuments' at La Vieille Grille, Paris, in January/February 1968, with Greenham appearing alongside performers that included Keith Humble and Serge Tcherepnin, the latter being one of the developers of the Serge Modular synthesizer system.

=== Teaching and later life ===
Greenham was a visiting tutor at a number of educational establishments during her lifetime, including Morley College in London, North East London Polytechnic, and the internationally renowned Barry Summer School at the Glamorgan College of Education in Wales, where she taught on the Fundamentals of Creativity and Colour Kinetics courses, and other mixed media projects. Barry was famous for its pioneering approach to arts education that annually attracted students from around the world, with other courses offered in areas as diverse as Welsh literature, sailing, millinery, rugby and puppetry. Notable arts tutors included George Brecht, Jeffrey Steele, Patrick Hughes, Ann Sutton, and Tom Hudson.

In later life Greenham increasingly devoted her time to writing, making art work using early computer graphics programmes and collaborating with film-makers, including Lis Rhodes & Jo Davis on Hang On A Minute (1983), part of a series of short films created for Channel 4. Greenham died on 31 October 2001 in London, aged 77.

== Legacy ==
Lingual Music, a double CD collection of her work, was released by Paradigm Discs in 2007, with liner notes from composer Michael Parsons. Her only published book of poems, Tune in to Reality!, was republished by Distance No Object in 2022, having originally appeared in 1974 as an edition of around 100 copies through Bob Cobbing's Writers Forum. Her archive of audio recordings, artworks and papers is now held in the Special Collections at Goldsmiths, University of London, having been rescued from her council flat following her death, and subsequently looked after, by close friends and colleagues Hugh Davies, Michael Parsons, Max Eastley and former husband Peter Greenham.

The first large-scale retrospective exhibition of her sound and visual work - Lily Greenham: An Art of Living - opened at the Badischer Kunstverein in Karlsruhe, Germany, on 8 March 2024 (running until 26 May). It marked the centenary of her birth and was realised in collaboration with Goldsmiths, University of London and the journal Bricks from the Kiln.

On September 16, 2025, two memorial plaques, or 'snublesten' ("stumbling stones"), were installed outside Greenham's former childhood home in the Charlottenlund district of Copenhagen in commemoration of Greenham (under her childhood name of Lily Henriette Pfiffer-Madsen) and her mother Rena Pfiffer-Madsen's persecution by Nazi authorities in Denmark during the Second World War.

== Discography ==
Under own name

- Internationale Sprachexperimente Der 50/60er Jahre/Tendentious Neo-Semantics 1970 In English, Edition Hoffmann, S-1 (LP) (1970).
- Tune In To Reality, edition OT london, (tape) (1974). A limited edition of 100 stereo 1/4" reel-to-reel tapes, with typewritten tracklisting on coloured card.
- Lingual Music, Paradigm Discs, PD22 (2CDs) (2007).

With various artists

- Konkrete Poesie – Sound Poetry – Artikulationen; Anastasia Bitzos (LP) (1966). Limited edition of 100; documentation of performances at Kunsthalle Bern, Switzerland.
- Poésie Sonore Internationale 1 & 2, Éditions Jean-Michel Place, K7 No. 1/10006 & K7 No. 2/10007 (2 cassettes) (1979). (Greenham, Lily; Seven Consonants In Space).
- Breathingspace/79 (Sound Poetry), Watershed Tapes, C-2003 (2 cassettes) (1979). (Greenham, Lily; 7 Consonants In Space)
