= Stephen Finucan =

Canadian fiction writer

- Born: 17 July 1968; Campbellford, Ontario, Canada
- Died: 14 May 2023 (aged 54); Nelson, British Columbia, Canada
- Education: Trent University; University of East Anglia
- Occupation: Writer
- Writing career
- Language: English

Stephen Finucan (17 July 1968 – 14 May 2023) was a Canadian fiction writer.

== Life ==
Finucan graduated from Trent University with a BA in literature and the University of East Anglia with an MA in creative writing. He was an instructor at the University of Toronto School of Continuing Studies, as well as a frequent contributor to The Toronto Star book pages. He died in 2023 to cancer.

== Literary career ==
Finucan's short stories and essays have appeared in numerous magazines, including Saturday Night, THIS Magazine, The Sewanee Review, The New Quarterly and B&A. He won the Humber School for Writers Prize in 1997, and was named Write Magazine's New Writer of the Year in 2000. His work has been shortlisted for the Upper Canada Brewing Company's Writer's Craft Award and the Ian St. James Award for Short Fiction. His debut novel, "The Fallen", was chosen as one of CBC Canada Reads Top 40 Essential Canadian Novels of the Decade.

== Works ==
- Happy Pilgrims (Insomniac Press, 2000)
- Foreigners (Penguin Group, 2003)
- The Fallen (Penguin Group, 2009)
