= Jean Rae Baxter =

Canadian author

- Born: Toronto, Ontario, Canada
- Occupations: Novelist, short story writer
- Writing career
- Genres: children, young adult, mystery
- Notable works: The Way Lies North, A Twist of Malice, Broken Trail
- Website: www.jeanraebaxter.com

Jean Rae Baxter is a Canadian author.

== Biography ==
Baxter grew up in Hamilton, Ontario. After spending her childhood in Hamilton, she attended the University of Toronto. After completing her master's degree in English, Baxter moved to Kingston, where she worked in radio before returning to university to earn her Bachelor of Education degree at Queen's. She then worked as a high school English teacher until 1996, when she moved back to Hamilton and began to write full-time. In 2016, she returned to Kingston, where she continues to write as well as conduct writing workshops.

She has two collections of short stories, A Twist of Malice, which was published in 2005 by Seraphim Editions, and Scattered Light, published in 2011 by Seraphim Editions. Her short stories have been included in such anthologies as Revenge and Hardboiled Love (Insomniac Press), and In the Wings and Scattered Light (Seraphim Editions), Her literary murder mystery Looking for Cardenio was published in 2008. She is the author of a series of Young Adult historical novels, the Forging a Nation Series, The first in this series, The Way Lies North, has been used in the International Baccalaureate Program (2014-2020). It and others in the series have won awards in Canada and the United States. The sixth and final book in the Forging a Nation series, The Knotted Rope is scheduled for Publication by Ronsdale Press in the spring of 2021. Baxter has already started work on a novel to be titled The Battle on the Ice, based on the American invasion of Pelee Island in 1836.

== Selected bibliography ==
- Jean Rae Baxter. (2005), A Twist of Malice, Seraphim Editions, ISBN 0-9734588-4-4
- Jean Rae Baxter. (2007), The Way Lies North, Ronsdale Press, ISBN 978-1-55380-048-4
- Jean Rae Baxter. (2008), Looking for Cardenio, Seraphim Editions, ISBN 978-0-9808879-0-7
- Jean Rae Baxter. (2011), Broken Trail, Ronsdale Press, ISBN 978-1-55380-109-2
- Jean Rae Baxter. (2011), Scattered Light, Woodstock: Seraphim Editions, ISBN 978-0-9808879-9-0
- Jean Rae Baxter. (2012), Freedom Bound, Vancouver: Ronsdale Press, ISBN 978-1-55380-143-6
- Respectable Appearance, Tel Aviv: Marenga Publishers, 2013
- Jean Rae Baxter. (2014), The White Oneida, Vancouver: Ronsdale Press ISBN 978-1 55380-332-4 (print) ISBN 978-1-55380-334-8 (ebook)
- Jean Rae Baxter. (2015), Hope's Journey, Vancouver: Ronsdale Press ISBN 978-1-55380-446-8 (print) ISBN 978-155380-447-5 (ebook)
- Jean Rae Baxter. (2021), The Knotted Rope, Vancouver: Ronsdale Press ISBN 978-1-55380-620-2 (print) ISBN 978-1-55380-621-9 (ebook)
- Jean Rae Baxter. (2023), Battle on the Ice, St. Mary's: Crossfield Publishing ISBN 978-1-990326-26-4 (print) ISBN 978-1-990326-31-8 (ebook)

== Awards ==
- 2000 Canadian Writer's Journal Award for "The Quilt".
- 2003 Hamilton Arts Council Short Fiction Award for "A Quick Release".
- 2004 Hamilton Arts Council Short Fiction Award for "Loss".
- 2003 Canadian Authors' Association Conference Contest shortlist for "Out! Out!"
- 2005 Crime Writers of Canada Golden Horseshoe Contest shortlist for "Josie's Custom Catering".
- 2007 Silver Hammer Award Honourable Mention for "Traveling by the Grand Bus Line".
- 2007 Silver Hammer Award for "Hole in One".
- 2008 Arts Hamilton Award: Young Adult Book for "The Way Lies North".
- 2008 Canadian Children's Book Centre named "The Way Lies North" a Best Book for Kids and Teens
- 2009 Ontario Library Association Forest of Reading Red Maple Award Nomination for "The Way Lies North".
- 2009 J.K. Galbraith Literary Award Semi-Finalist for "The Way Lies North".
- 2009-2010 Stellar Book Award British Columbia Teen Readers' Choice Award Nomination for The Way Lies North.
- 2010 J.K. Galbraith Literary Award Shortlist for "Devotion".
- 2010 J.K. Galbraith Literary Award First Prize for "After Annabelle".
- 2010 Surrey International Writers' Conference Shortlist for "The Errand,"published in Scattered Light.
- 2011 Moonbeam Children's Book Award Gold Medal for Young Adult Historical/Cultural Fiction for Broken Trail.
- 2012 Moonbeam Children's Book Award Bronze Medal for Young adult Historical Fiction for Freedom Bound.
- 2012 New England Book Festival, Boston. Honourable Mention for Freedom Bound.
- 2013 Hamilton Wentworth Heritage Association Award.
- 2016 Canadian Children's Book Centre named Hope`s Journey a Best Book for Kids and Teens.
