= Braman (surname) =

Braman is a surname. Notable people with the name include:

- Art Braman (1897–1967), American football player
- Bryan Braman (1987–2025), American football player
- Ella Frances Braman (1850–?), American lawyer and businesswoman
- John Braman (1627–1703), English politician
- James d'Orma Braman (1901–1980), former mayor of Seattle, Washington
- Norman Braman (born 1932), American auto dealer and former owner of the Philadelphia Eagles
- Sandra Braman (born 1951), American communications professor
- Waters W. Braman (1840–1893), New York politician
