= GrOnk =

1967 Canadian lit mag, concrete poetry

grOnk, or GRoNK, was a Canadian literary magazine begun in 1967 by bpNichol and others (for example, David Aylward, David W. Harris (later David UU; co-editor for the first series (8 issues, 1967), and editor of most of the seventh series (5 of 8 issues, 1971)), and Rah Smith (i.e. Robert Hindley-Smith). After the primary 8 series of 8 issues each were published, it was Nichol's efforts that maintained the irregular periodical, with guest editors including (but not limited to) Nelson Ball, jwcurry, Steve McCaffery and R. Murray Schafer. An offshoot of Ganglia Press's Ganglia magazine (founded in Toronto, Ontario, in 1965 by Aylward and Nichol), grOnk began with material gathered for Ganglia's sixth issue and became a monthly publication focusing on concrete poetry and "the language revolution" underway in Canada at the time (principally in Toronto and Vancouver), publishing a wide variety of "extralinear" writing from an international cast of contributors anchored in a context of parallel developments in Canadian literature. "GrOnk brought together British, Czech, American, Canadian, French and Austrian concrete and experimental practitioners..."

One of Canada's longest running independent little magazines, grOnk ran for 126 distinct issues in a wide range of book and magazine formats utilizing diverse print technologies such as letterpress, rubberstamp, mimeography, offset and, later, xerography and audiocassette, including many hand-wrought additions (for examples, John Riddell's "A hOle in the Head" included many handcoloured pages and scissor-cut windows, while jwcurry's "AS IS OR WITH" was drawn entirely by hand throughout the edition). 6 issues, the grOnk Piggyback Series, ran as broadside sections in the Toronto literary tabloid Poetry Canada Review (1987–89).

grOnk ceased publication in 1988 with the death of bpNichol, although some numbers have continued to be issued in the grOnk Inadmissible Series by Nicky Drumbolis's Letters and jwcurry's Room 302 Books.
