= David UU =

David UU (pronounced David W.), or David W. Harris, (1948–1994) was an accomplished concrete and experimental poet and an important small press publisher. Along with Bill Bissett and bpNichol, he was a pioneer of the concrete poetry movement in Canada, and perhaps the first Canadian poet to explore visual collage embodying literary, philosophical and language references. He also composed sound works (both musical & textual), made 8mm short films, was a master collagist/montagist and performed in numerous performance art exhibitions.

"And I should mention to you that my last name is...just UU, the original form of the English letter W, which is also how it's pronounced." - David UU (from a letter to M.A.C. Farrant, Oct 19, 1989)

== Life ==
David W. Harris was born on June 13, 1948, in Barrie, Ontario. The family moved to Collingwood in 1958, where he lived until setting out for Toronto in 1966. He left Toronto for Vancouver in 1968 and over the next decade relocated between Ontario and the west coast several times. In 1980 he settled in North Vancouver where he lived until finally moving to a farmhouse near Delhi, Ontario in 1992 where he died in May 1994.

== Career ==
On arriving in Toronto in 1966, Harris began working closely with bpNichol on various text and sound projects. He participated in the founding of the concrete poetry magazine grOnk with David Aylward, bpNichol and Rah Smith. At this time he began exhibiting his visual poetry and collage worldwide, achieving some acclaim. Harris adopted the pseudonym David UU around 1970. In Vancouver in 1973 he helped organize Brasilia 73, an international concrete poetry show. He was a prolific publisher and encouraged the talents of many Canadian writers early in their careers. He founded and operated Fleye Press (1966–70), Divine Order of the Lodge (1971–1975), Derwyddon Press (1976–81), Silver Birch Press (1987–94; later MindWare) as well as several magazines (Spanish Fleye and Luv for Poemz from Fleye Press in the mid 1960s and Lodgistiks from Derwyddon Press in the 1970s) and numerous imprints for booklets, pamphlets, broadsides, postcards and other ephemera.

== Works ==
Due to the nature of his work, which included broadsides, pamphlets and postcards, the bulk of David's UU's work was self-published. Two major editions are Chopped Liver (Toronto: Coach House Press, 1981) and High C – Collected Sound and Visual Poems 1965-1983 (Toronto: Underwhich Editions, 1991). Very Sound, an audiocassette of his sound poetry, was published by Underwhich Audiographics in 1984. Other publications include: POEMS NUMBERED ONE THRU SIX (Toronto, Ganglia Press, 1966) GIDEON MUSIC (Vancouver, Blewointmentpress, 1967) TOUCH (Toronto, Ganglia Press, 1967) MOTION/PICTURES (Toronto, Ganglia Press, 1969) PAMPLEMOUSSE (Vancouver, Blewointmentpress, 1969) GNOSTIC INVENTORY (Toronto, Ganglia Press, 197o) AURORA HYPERBOREALIS (Toronto, Divine Order Of The Lodge, 1971) BEFORE THE GOLDEN DAWN (Toronto, Weed/Flower Press, 1971) VIOLET PILOT LIGHTS (Vancouver, Blewointmentpress, 1974) METROPOLIS (Toronto, Curvd H&z, 1981) CLOSE ENCOUNTER (Toronto, Curvd H&z, 1983) SOUND CYCLE (Toronto, Underwhich Editions, 1986) STRAWBERRY TRIGGER (Toronto, Wendysstomack, 1988) INGRID OF THE THOUSAND EYES (Willowdale, Pangen Subway Ritual, 199o)

== See also ==
- List of Canadian writers
- List of Canadian poets
- List of concrete and visual poets
- Sound poetry
- Visual poetry

== Sources ==
- David UU, Correspondence with M.A.C. Farrant, February 15, 1988 - May 17, 1994.
- jwcurry, December 23, 1992; Room 3o2 Books: list #7: David UU: No Sleight of Hand.
- Gregg Simpson, May, 2010; Meeting David UU, a memoir.
- Library and Archives Canada, Ottawa, List of Fonds and Collections, HARRIS, DAVID, 1948-1994 LMS-0217
- William H. New. Encyclopedia of Literature in Canada. Toronto: U of T Press, 2002.
