= Jaap Blonk =

Dutch composer and performance artist

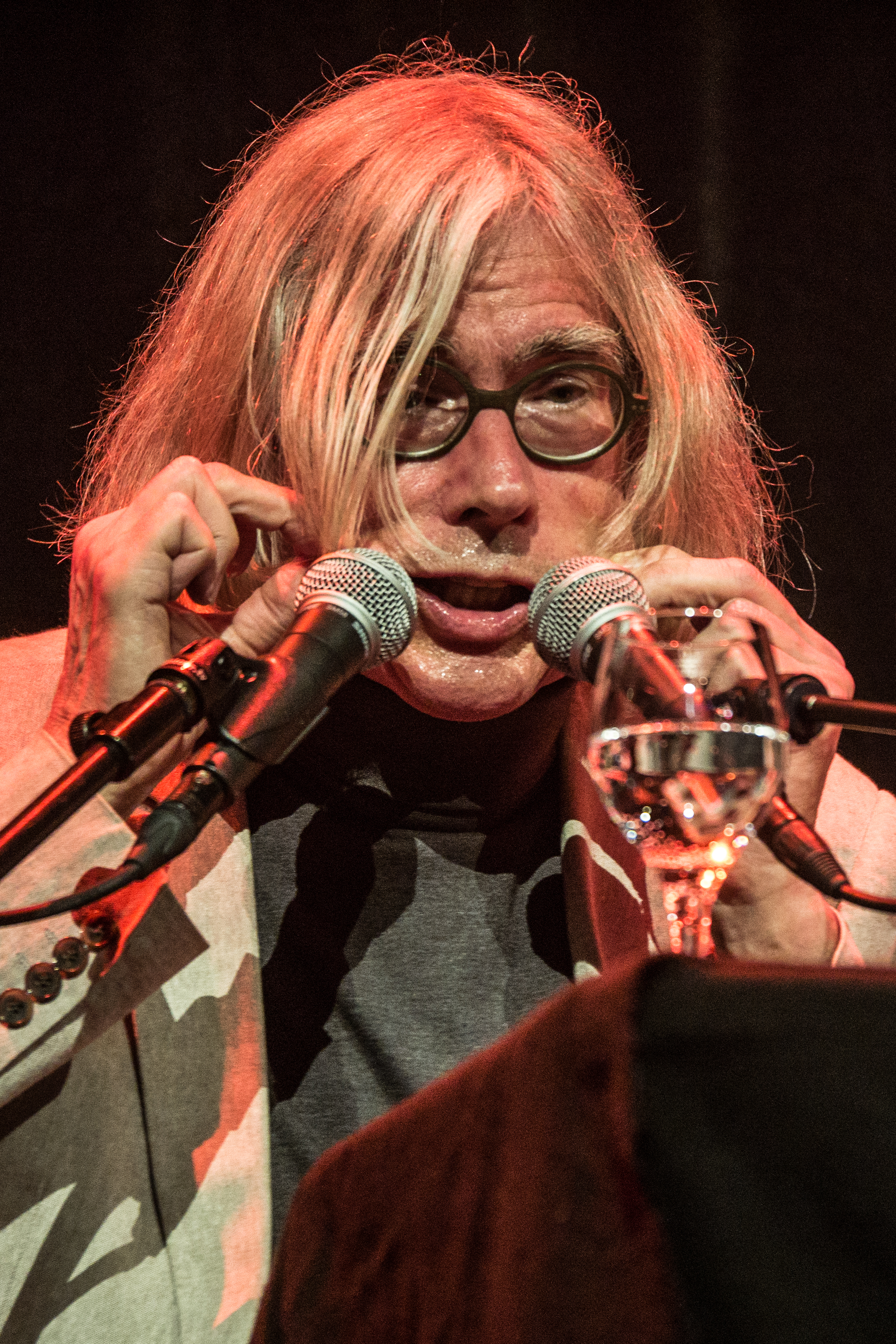
Blonk at the Moers Festival 2017

Jaap Blonk (born 1953, Woerden) is a Dutch avant-garde composer and performance artist.

== Career ==
Blonk is primarily self-taught both as a sound artist and as a visual/stage performer. He studied physics, mathematics, and musicology for a time, but did not complete his studies.

One of his early influences was Kurt Schwitters, whose Ursonate he first heard in 1979; he memorized the entire work, and it became one of the cornerstones of his repertory; he has recited portions of the piece hundreds of times in various public places. His compositions and performances are examples of sound poetry, making use of words and phonetic snippets as well as clicks, hisses, and other vocal manipulations.

He works as a solo performer, in collaboration with avant-garde musicians such as John Tchicai, Tristan Honsiger, and Mats Gustafsson, and with his own ensembles Splinks and BRAAXTAAL. His live performances involve humor and improvisation, and are occasionally received poorly by audiences, as when he was booked as an opener for punk rock band The Stranglers early in the 1980s.

== Discography ==
- Baba-Oemf (1989)
- BRAAXTAAL (1991)
- Splinks (1992)
- Flux - De Bouche (1992)
- Improvisors (1996)
- Improvisors Vol. 2 (1996)
- Speechlos (1997)
- Vocalor (1998)
- Consensus (1998)
- First Meetings (1999)
- Averschuw (2001)
- Dworr Buun (2001)
- Electric Solo Improvisations (2001)
- Improvisors, Vol. 3 (2003)
- Five Men Singing (2004)
- Pre-Zoic Cellways (2005)
- Sprachspuren/Traces of Speech (2012)
- Das Kapital (2017) with Kommissar Hjuler & J. O. Olbrich
- Geräusche (2020) with Mama Baer
- Antonin Artaud's To Have Done With the Judgment of God (2020)
