= Jacqueline Wheldon =

English author (1924–1993)

- Born: Jacqueline Mary Clarke; 20 May 1924; Clonmel Road, Fulham, West London, England
- Died: 21 June 1993 (aged 69)
- Occupation: Author

Jacqueline Mary Wheldon, Lady Wheldon (née Clarke, 20 May 1924 – 21 June 1993), was an English author.

== Early life and education ==
Jacqueline Mary Clarke was born in Clonmel Road, Fulham, West London, the first child and only daughter of Hugh Clarke (1892–1930), a toolmaker, and Lillie Nunns (1890–1980), the daughter of a railway guard, Harry Nunns, and his wife Elizabeth. Her father, whom she remembered despite his death when she was six years old, told her "with absolute certainty" that she would be a writer.

She was educated at Carlyle School, Chelsea. When the school was evacuated to Windsor at the beginning of World War II, she absconded back to London several times, by bicycle, and was eventually expelled. Throughout the war, she lived in Ealing with her mother, working first for Hoover and then for the local council. She joined the Labour Party and in 1945 was the East Ealing Labour Party delegate to the party conference. In a letter written shortly before her death, she wrote that her life "started with an arrival, inauspicious, at the LSE London School of Economics". Actually she had been discovered by Professor Harold Laski when she asked him to talk at the Ealing branch of the Labour League of Youth. Laski invited her to come and work in the Machine Room as a secretary to the Statistics Department at the LSE for two years, and in 1948 she was admitted to the school.

Laski's successor was Michael Oakeshott, whose profound influence on Wheldon's politics expressed itself gradually over the years. Her political activism, great in youth, and to be resurgent in later life, was to be subsumed in literary endeavour. While Laski's desire "to share what is most dignified in human nature" was the reason Wheldon had arrived at LSE, one of her own observations once there was that "it is not the case that the elite possess the works, but that the works possess the elite... The elite as I met it at LSE was at my service; there would have been no 'beauties' of Plato, Rousseau, Hobbes for me to have 'a sight' of, if generations of individuals whom these writers had come to 'possess' had not submitted to serve and to keep these works intact and ever re-creative and re-created."

Now, studying part-time, it was work during the day, lectures in the evening and the Labour Party increasingly on the side. She received high marks for an essay on economic history and was encouraged to expand it and put it in for a State Scholarship for Mature Students, which she received. She became a full-time student at the age of 26. Michael Oakeshott undertook the whole course on the history of political thought. She later wrote that "the first book I really read in my life, ignoring all introductions, prefaces, commentaries, was Cornford's translation of The Republic".

Wheldon gained an Upper Second and left LSE in 1954 to start research at the Nuffield Foundation in Cambridge with Dr Hilde Himmelweit on the book Television and the Child. In Cambridge, she made a number of lifelong friends to whom she was introduced by Norman Podhoretz (whom she had met on a holiday in Greece in 1951, and who later became editor of the American intellectual monthly Commentary), including novelist Dan Jacobson and chemist Aaron Klug (who won the Nobel Prize in 1982). F. R. Leavis still held court at Downing College, and the students of English were in his thrall. Through them, Wheldon was introduced to The Novel. She "read enormously... came alive in a curious kind of way".

In 1955, Wheldon applied successfully for a post in the Cabinet Office and was at the same time asked to become an officer in the Joint Intelligence Bureau at the Ministry of Defence. She turned down both positions, probably due to her marriage to the broadcaster Huw Wheldon. They were married at St John's Church, Fulham, on 2 April 1956. It was to be a marriage of intense mutual dependence and uninterrupted loving kindness.

In June 1957, she returned to LSE to resume a PhD on 19th-century political thought, but it was never finished and perhaps hardly truly begun, for by July she was pregnant with her first child.

== Writer ==
Wheldon had begun to contribute articles on television to such journals as Truth and Context, but she had begun to work on a novel that, following the birth of two further children, was to grow by 1964 to well over 400,000 words (she trimmed it to 220,000 for publication). Mrs Bratbe's August Picnic was published in 1965. It earned plaudits from, among others, Richard Church in Country Life ("the most astonishing first novel I have ever read") and Anthony Burgess in The Listener, who called Mrs Bratbe "as outrageous a prodigy as we have had this side of the war." Mrs Bratbe's August Picnic is a retelling of the Oedipus story, with the sexes reversed. Alexandra, daughter of the outrageous media magnate Hytha O. Bratbe, is brought up in France, falls in love (unknowingly) with her father, causes the death of her monstrous mother and blinds herself in remorse. The writing was considered (in The TLS) to owe much to the "shadow" of Iris Murdoch and the "ghosts" of Aldous Huxley and Virginia Woolf. Wheldon in fact looked more to the 'great tradition' for her master's degree and in particular to Henry James and D. H. Lawrence.

Before Mrs Bratbe's August Picnic had been published, Wheldon was at work on a new novel, Daughters of the Flood. It was never published. A conservative estimate of two million words made it quite unpublishable as a single work (for comparison: Marcel Proust's A la recherche du temps perdu – a work Wheldon revered – is around a million words). Wheldon would never consent to the piecemeal publication that her publishers urged on her, and eventually, as she wrote to Dan Jacobson, the book "shattered" in her hands.

Set nominally in London and Korea in the years of the Korean War, it is, it has been said, "about everything", though to Norman Podhoretz, she said it was "about running". Wheldon and her mother had been sprinters in their youths. The remark was unhelpful to Podhoretz but her son Wynn has interpreted it as meaning simply "about living to your very utmost limit". Wheldon ceased writing the book on the death of her mother in 1980, and never went back to it. She wrote that she was never more alive than when she was writing.

== Later life ==
In 1980, she was asked to become Director of the UK branch of the Committee for the Free World, an organisation of intellectuals unified by a desire to stiffen the sinews of western resistance to communism, to argue against unilateral nuclear disarmament by the West, and to press for the installation of cruise missiles in Western Europe (in response to the communist deployment of SS-20 nuclear missiles in Eastern Europe). Alun Chalfont was the chairman and the committee included intellectuals such as Raymond Aron, Sybille Bedford, Max Beloff, Milovan Djilas, Joachim Fest, and Tom Stoppard. Its activities culminated in the conference "Beyond 1984", which addressed the continuing threat of communism throughout the world.

Her penultimate battle was against the author of her husband's biography. He had discovered, among unsorted papers, letters from Huw Wheldon to his wife of an extremely intimate kind describing sexual fantasies, and had used these, without having informed Wheldon of his discovery, as the foundation of a biography of the broadcaster. Despite widespread disdain for the book among critics, Wheldon felt that she was at fault, that she had betrayed her husband ("inexcusable treachery" was her term), and by this her morale was destroyed. The book was published in 1990. She struggled with attempts to write her own memoir of her husband, but her desire for omniscience hindered her. After three years battling deteriorating health, Wheldon died of cancer on 21 June 1993 at Charing Cross Hospital, Hammersmith, not far from her childhood home. Among her final words were: “I shall have such a lot to write about when I get out of here”. Her ashes joined those of her husband at the base of an unmarked tree in the Royal Botanical Gardens at Kew.

Wheldon was short, blonde, blue-eyed, attractive. Her deafness gave her a kind of physical grace, "like patience on a monument". She enjoyed the company of intelligent men and women of the world, and they enjoyed hers. She maintained a long correspondence with the art critic John Berger, and with her husband's friend the sculptor and novelist Jonah Jones. After her husband's death, the novelist Kingsley Amis made rare trips out of London to take tea at her house in Richmond. The broadcaster Michael Charlton was often in her company. The philosophers Roger Scruton and Kenneth Minogue were regular correspondents, as was the distinguished international lawyer, Robert Glynn. John Mansfield, emeritus Professor of Jurisprudence at Harvard University, read 1 Corinthians 13 at her funeral. Paul Wright wrote that "It was perhaps her constant desire for perfection that was responsible for leaving us so small a literary legacy".

Dan Jacobson wrote that Wheldon "had a gift for friendship"; Melvyn Bragg used precisely the same words, adding that "she was one of the very few clever people who was also good". Norman Podhoretz wrote: "I have known a few people of genius... but of them all, she was the most luminous."

"I’m very interested in what God is," she once said, "interested in the idea that God is profound experience". By 1976 she had faith enough to write a prayer for her husband during a dire illness. She equated God and love. One of her characters (in the unpublished Daughters of the Flood) writes that "love makes the heart yearn for eloquence".

== Sources ==
- L. G. Stroud, Unpublished memoir
- P. Ferris, Sir Huge: The Life of Huw Wheldon (1990)
- Wynn Wheldon, Kicking the Bar: A Filial Biography of Huw Wheldon (Unbound, 2016)
