= Paul Vermeersch =

Canadian poet (born 1973)

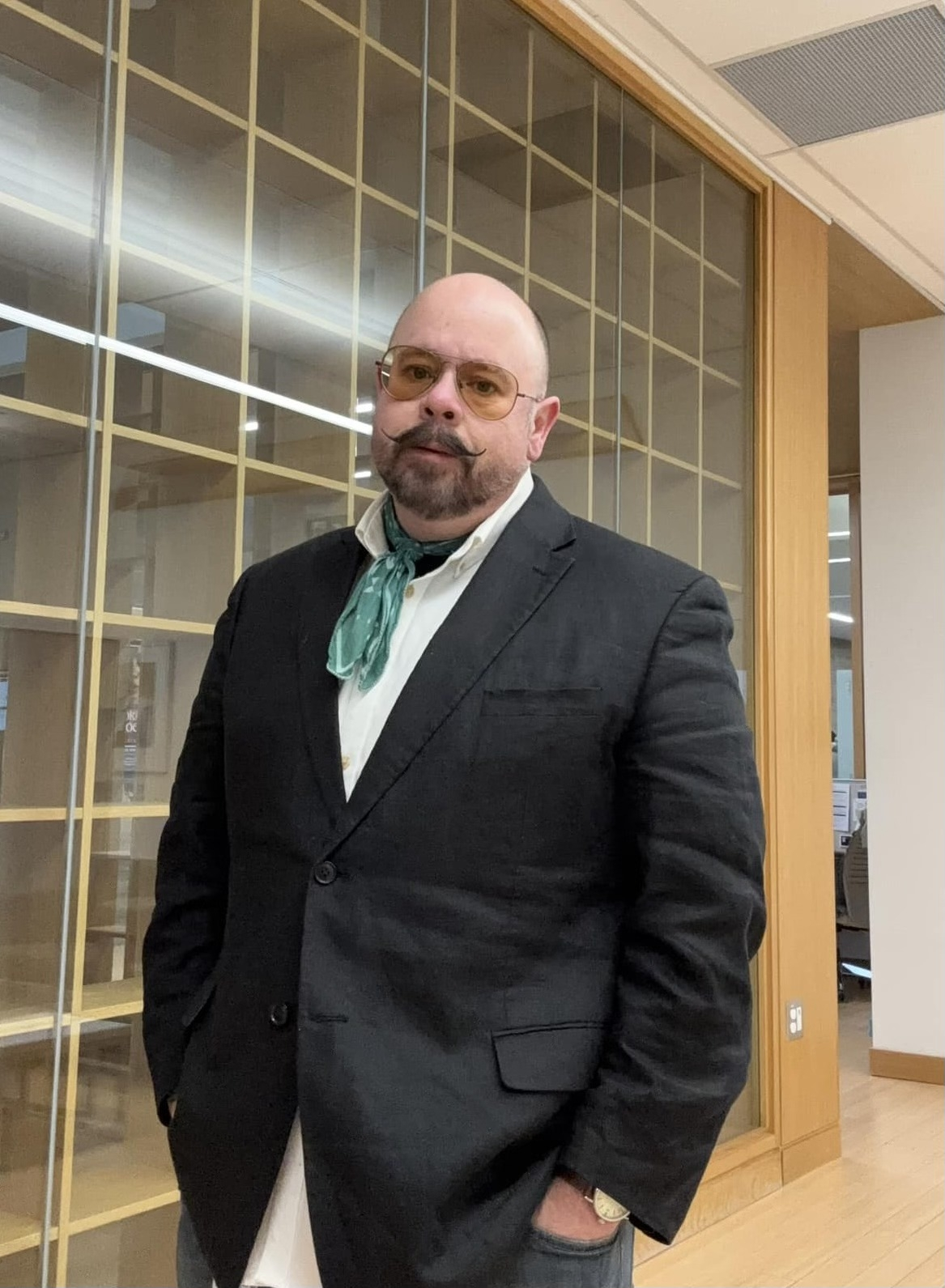
- Born: 17 November 1973 (age 53); Mississauga, Ontario, Canada
- Education: University of Western Ontario (BA); University of Guelph (MFA)
- Occupation: Poet
- Awards: Governor General's Gold Medal
- Website: www.paulvermeersch.ca

Paul Joseph Vermeersch (born 17 November 1973) is a Canadian poet from Ontario.

== Life and career ==
Vermeersch was born in Mississauga, Ontario on 17 November 1973. After high school, he earned his Bachelor of Arts from the University of Western Ontario, later graduating from the University of Guelph (Note: The Canadian Encyclopedia has stated that Vermeersch received his Master of Fine Arts from the University of Western Ontario, however sources from the University of Guelph indicate he received his degree from there.) with a Master of Fine Arts in creative writing. Following his graduation, Vermeersch spent a year studying poetry in Poland as well as teaching English before moving to Toronto where he founded the IV Lounge Reading Series. Authors who were involved with the IV Lounge Reading Series contributed to The I.V. Lounge Reader, a book assembled and edited by Versmeerch and released in 2001. Contributions to the book include poems from authors such as David McGimpsy, Michael Holmes, and Patrick Rawley. From 2001 until 2012, Vermeersch worked as the poetry editor for Insomniac Press; he subsequently took a position as senior editor at Wolsak & Wynn Publishers. Vermeersch's first poetry collection, Burn (2000), was assembled from his work in the late 1990s and was a finalist for the 2001 Gerald Lampert Award. This was followed by The Fat Kid (2002), Between the Walls (2005), and The Al Purdy A-frame Anthology (2009), a book of poems, photographs, and drawings concerning the A-frame house of the Canadian poet Al Purdy, a place with significant historical relevance to Canadian literature. The book was intended to draw attention to fundraising projects to save the house. Vermeersch's 2010 book The Reinvention of the Human Hand was a finalist for the 2010 Trillium Book Award.

Vermeersch's 2018 poetry collection Self-Defence for the Brave and Happy took on the theme of futurism, and was well-received by critics. This was followed up by Shared Universe in 2020, featuring a collection of Vermeersch's best work since the 1990s, as well as new material which had not yet been published.

In 2025, Vermeersch was among the three judges for the 2025 CBC Poetry Prize, along with Carol Rose GoldenEagle and Britta Badour.

As of 2025, Vermeersch teaches at Sheridan College in Mississauga and works as the senior editor of Buckrider Books, an imprint of Wolsak & Wynn Publishers. Vermeersch has been the senior editor of Buckrider since the imprint launched in 2014, and had been acquiring titles to be published by the imprint for two years beforehand.

== Publications ==
- Vermeersch, Paul (1999). What You Wish Wasn't True. Toronto, ON: Wayward Armadillo. ISBN 978-0-9684-8331-2. OCLC 976502512.
- — (2000). Burn. Toronto, ON: ECW Press. ISBN 978-1-5502-2436-8. OCLC 44620724.
- —, ed. (2001). The I.V. Lounge Reader. Toronto, ON: Insomniac Press. ISBN 978-1-8946-6303-8. OCLC 605730983.
- — (2002). The Fat Kid. Toronto, ON: ECW Press. ISBN 978-1-5502-2515-0. OCLC 51330473.
- — (2003). Widows & Orphans. Toronto, ON: Junction Books. ISBN 978-1-8948-3105-5. OCLC 52095521.
- — (2005). Between the Walls. Toronto, ON: McClelland & Stewart. ISBN 978-0-7710-8744-8. OCLC 56683976.
- — (2009). The Al Purdy A-frame Anthology. Madeira Park, B.C.: Harbour Publishing. ISBN 978-1-5501-7502-8. OCLC 428868520.
- — (2010). The Reinvention of the Human Hand. Plattsburgh, N.Y.: McClelland & Stewart. ISBN 978-0-7710-8743-1. OCLC 653476203.
- — (2014). Don't Let It End Like This Tell Them I Said Something. Toronto, ON: ECW Press. ISBN 978-1-7709-0630-3. OCLC 1066453804.
- — (2018). Self-Defence for the Brave and Happy. Toronto, ON: ECW Press. ISBN 978-1-7704-1223-1. OCLC 1039294661.
- — (2020). Shared Universe. Toronto, ON: ECW Press. ISBN 978-1-7704-1224-8. OCLC 1143633371.

== Recognition ==
- Governor General's Gold Medal (2012)
