= Barbara Caruso =

Canadian artist (1937-2009)

- Born: Barbara Ann Caruso; 1937; Kincardine, Ontario
- Died: December 30, 2009 (aged 71–72); Brantford, Ontario
- Education: Ontario College of Art, graduated 1965
- Spouse: Nelson Ball (m. 1965)
- Awards: Canada Council travel grant (1971)

Barbara Caruso (1937–2009) was an abstract painter.

== Career ==
After graduation from the Ontario College of Art in 1965, Caruso worked in Toronto. In 1985, she moved to Paris, Ontario, with her husband poet, editor, publisher, and bookseller Nelson Ball (1942–2019).

== Work ==
Caruso considered her paintings to be about the nature of colour, and her drawings to be about the elements that constitute the work.: "line, direction, shape and surface". Her work is "orderly" or as she described it, "rigorously planar". She took the strictures of post-painterly abstraction to heart, denying spontaneous gesture, the textured surface or any suggestion of illusory pictorial depth, although she admitted seriality.

Since 1966, she exhibited twenty-one solo shows, most notably at public galleries such as the Agnes Etherington Art Centre, Kingston (1979); Confederation Centre Art Gallery, Charlottetown, Prince Edward Island (1977); and Owens Art Gallery, Mount Allison University, Sackville, New Brunswick (1975), and at private and co-op galleries such as Artword Gallery, Toronto (1999). She also participated in numerous group shows in Canada and abroad, including Formalist Encounters, organized by the Woodstock Art Gallery which travelled in Ontario (1986–1987); and The Empirical Presence (1991) at Galerie Optica in Montreal.

Her work is in public collections including the Art Gallery of Ontario, the Agnes Etherington Art Centre, the Art Gallery of Hamilton, the Robert McLaughlin Gallery, and others as well as in private collections in Canada and the U.S. She received awards from the Canada Council (a travel award in 1971) and the Ontario Arts Council.

Caruso was editor and printer/publisher of Seripress (1972–1980), publishing visual and concrete poetry. Her writing on art appeared in Canadian art and literary publications. In 1986, an issue of Open Letter was devoted to her work. In 2001, her book Wording the Silent Art was published by Mercury Press in Toronto. Her book of memoirs, A Painter's Journey, consisting of diary entries made between June, 1966, and December, 1973, was published by the same press in 2005. A second volume of A Painter's Journey, detailing 1974–1979, came out in 1979.
