= Insomniac Press =

Insomniac Press was a Canadian independent book publisher.

Founded in 1992 and based in London, Ontario, Insomniac began as a publisher of poetry chapbooks. The company has since evolved into a publisher of a wide variety of fiction, poetry and non-fiction work by emerging Canadian writers. Authors published by Insomniac have included Natalee Caple, Jon Paul Fiorentino, Jean Rae Baxter, Lynn Crosbie, Stephen Finucan, Sky Gilbert, Lynnette D'anna, Howard Hampton, R. M. Vaughan, Jane Rule, Anne Stone, Anthony Bidulka and A. F. Moritz.

The company has also published a number of books by musicians, including Matthew Good, Jann Arden, Terri Clark, Lillian Allen, Damhnait Doyle, Michelle Wright and Ra McGuire.

In 2004, it published the visual book Belong: A TV Journalist's Search For Urban Culture by Canadian culture journalist and photographer Jennifer Morton.

Insomniac Press was founded by Mike O'Connor, who is still the current publisher. Editorial staff for the press has changed over the last decade but has included several Canadian writers such as Paul Vermeersch, Stephen Cain, Emily Schultz, and Jon Paul Fiorentino.

In 2021, after 29 years in business, Insomniac Press closed. Insomniac Press published more than 300 books by more than 200 authors. Those books were sold around the world and translated into 20 different languages between them all.
