= Sandra Braman =

American academic

Sandra Braman (born 1951) is a professor in the Department of Media and Information at Michigan State University. She is a senior scholar at the James H. and Mary B. Quello Center at Michigan State, a fellow at the International Communication Association, an Ostrom Workshop affiliate at Indiana University, and an editor of the Information Policy series published by MIT Press.

== Education ==
Braman holds a PhD in Journalism and Mass Communication from the University of Minnesota. During her time as a doctoral candidate, she wrote the paper titled The "Facts" of El Salvador According to Objective and New Journalism (Journal of Communication Inquiry, 1985).

== Career ==
Braman's work and research on information policy, the macro-level effects of digital technologies and their policy implications has been supported by the United States National Science Foundation, the First Amendment Fund, and by the Ford, Rockefeller, and Soros Foundations. She was previously the Freedom of Expression Professor at the University of Bergen (Norway), visiting professor at the Federal University of Rio de Janeiro (Brazil), and visiting professor and FIRST Scholar at the University of Colorado-Boulder.

Braman has served as chair of the Communication Law & Policy Division of the International Communication Association and chair of the law section of the International Association of Media and Communication Research, sits on the editorial boards of nine scholarly journals, and in 1997-1998 designed and implemented the first graduate-level program in telecommunication and information policy on the African continent, for the University of South Africa.

Prior to her current appointment, Braman was a professor of Telecommunication Media Studies in the Department of Communication at Texas A&M University, Professor of Communication at the University of Wisconsin–Milwaukee, served as Reese Phifer Professor of Telecommunication at the University of Alabama, Henry Rutgers Research Fellow at Rutgers University, research assistant professor at the University of Illinois Urbana-Champaign, and the Silha Fellow of Media Law and Ethics at the University of Minnesota.

== Awards ==
Among Braman's noteworthy achievements, she received the 2022 ICA Edwin C. Baker Award and the 2022 ICA Fellows Book Award for her book Change of State: Information, Policy, and Power (MIT Press, 2006).

== Partial bibliography ==
Works by Sandra Braman include:

- Communication Researchers and Policy-making, Editor (MIT Press, 2003). ISBN 978-0-262-52340-0
- Biotechnology and Communication: The Meta-Technologies of Information (Lawrence Erlbaum, 2004). ISBN 978-0-415-64608-6.
- The Emergent Global Information Policy Regime (Palgrave MacMillan, 2004). ISBN 978-1-4039-0369-3
- Information Technology, National Identity, and Social Cohesion (Bloomsbury Academic, 2005). ISBN 978-0-89206-458-8
- Change of State: Information Policy and Power (MIT Press, 2006). ISBN 978-0-262-02597-3

Articles by Sandra Braman have been published multiple academic journals including First Monday, Global Media and Communication, Information Society, International Journal of Communication, International Journal of Media & Cultural Politics, Internet Policy Review, Journal of the American Society for Information Science and Technology, Journal of Information Policy, and New Media & Society.
