= BpNichol =

Canadian poet (1944–1988)

bpNichol
- Born: 30 September 1944; Vancouver
- Died: 25 September 1988 (aged 43); Toronto
- Writing career
- Language: English
- Genre: Poetry
- Notable work: The Martyrology
- Notable awards: Governor General's Award for poetry
- Literary movement: Concrete poetry; The Four Horsemen
- Website: Official website

Barrie Phillip Nichol (30 September 1944 – 25 September 1988), known as bpNichol, was a Canadian poet, writer, sound poet, editor, creative writing teacher at York University in Toronto and grOnk/Ganglia Press publisher. His body of work encompasses poetry, children's books, television scripts, novels, short fiction, electronic literature, and sound poetry. His love of language and writing, evident in his many accomplishments, continues to be carried forward by many.

== Work ==
Nichol was born in Vancouver, British Columbia. Though his early writing consisted of fiction and lyrical poems, he first received international recognition in the 1960s for concrete poetry. The first major publications included Journeying & the returns (1967), a purple box containing visual & lyrical poems and Konfessions of an Elizabethan Fan Dancer (1969) a book of concrete poetry. He won the 1970 Governor General's Award for poetry with four publications: the prose booklet The True Eventual Story of Billy the Kid a collection of lyrical poems, Beach Head, the boxed concrete sequence, Still Water and The Cosmic Chef, a boxed anthology of concrete and visual poetry.

His best known work, The Martyrology (1972–1992) is an open-ended, lifelong poem that investigates language. The 'saints' are drawn from 'st' words (storm becomes St. Orm) and their spiritual quest provides a springboard from which linguistic issues of textuality, reading and writing are explored.

Nichol frequently collaborated with other artists. The work of the sound poetry group, The Four Horsemen (Nichol, Rafael Barreto-Rivera, Paul Dutton and Steve McCaffery) has been documented in Volcano Theatre's stage performances of The Four Horsemen Project (Dora Mavor Moore Award 2007 & 2015). He collaborated with Steve McCaffery to form The Toronto Research Group (TRG), with Barbara Caruso, visual artist, with R. Murray Schafer, Howard Gerhard and John Beckwith, composers.

Nichol's zest for publishing other writers was reflected in founding Ganglia Press with David Aylward in 1964 and grOnk in 1967 with Aylward, Rob Hindley-Smith and David UU ( David W. Harris). He was a volunteer editor at Coach House Books from 1975 to his death. In 1978, he was one of the collective that established Underwhich Editions which edited, designed, published and distributed the works of worthy writers. During the 1970s and 80s, he was a contributing editor of Open Letter, a literary magazine.

Nichol also had a large presence on screens of various sizes. In the mid-1980s, he became a writer for the children's television show, Fraggle Rock, created by Jim Henson. Soon, scriptwriting for other children's television shows followed: The Raccoons, Under the Umbrella Tree, Care Bears and Babar. Several films include bp and his work, starting with Michael Ondaatje's short film, Sons of Captain Poetry; Ron Mann's Poetry in Motion followed by bp: pushing the boundaries, directed by Brian Nash, and more recently, Justin Stephenson's award-winning film, The Complete Works. He died in Toronto, Ontario, five days shy of his 44th birthday. Since his death, there has been an upsurge of interest in First Screenings, Nichol's 1984 computer poem (updated by Jim Andrews and his team) which has been part of electronic exhibitions from Mexico to Oakville.

== Therafields ==
Barrie Nichol / bpNichol was also a central figure in the psychoanalytic community Therafields, from the early 1960s into the early 1980s, with his formal resignation as vice-president of the organization in 1982. Nichol dedicates The Martyrology to the founder, Lea Hindley-Smith, “for lea / without whose act of friendship / quite literally none of this would have been written’ (14) and the work makes many references to Therafields, Lea, the Annex, and Mono Mills, where the organization owned multiple properties, and some named individuals. Nichol “underwent personal therapy” in 1963” with Lea, and he is credited with stating, ”In my case, I think therapy literally saved my life” (Scobie 18).

== Commemoration ==
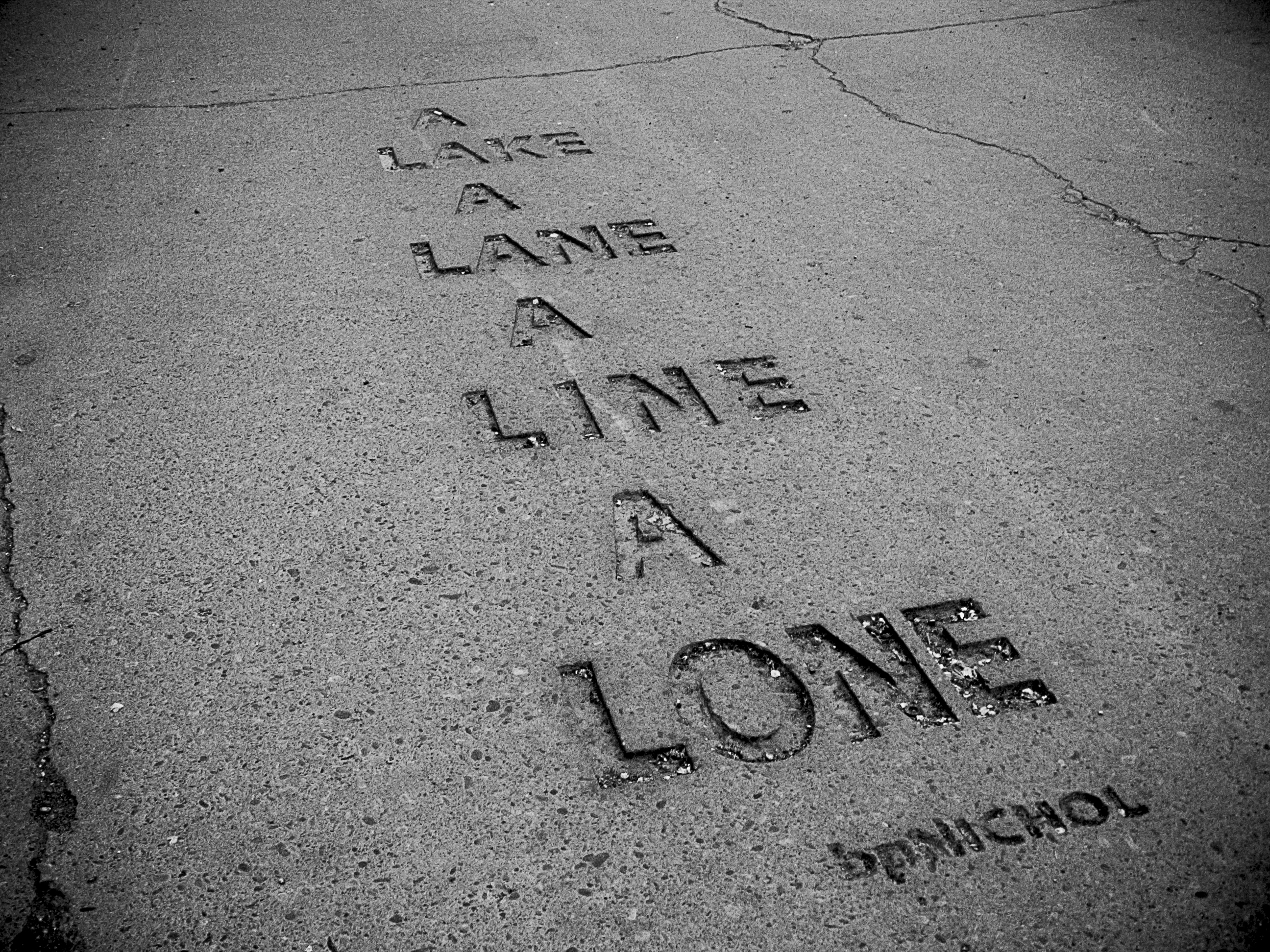
A / LAKE / A / LANE / A / LINE / A / LONE - bpNichol

The bpNichol Chapbook Award, a prize for poetry publications between 10 and 48 pages, was established in 1986 by Phoenix Community Works Foundation. This annual award for excellence in Canadian Poetry in English is now administered by Meet the Presses collective.

A street in Toronto, Ontario, Canada, is named in his honour. bpNichol Lane is located near Huron and Sussex Streets beside Coach House Books. It features an eight-line poem by Nichol carved into the pavement: "A / LAKE / A / LANE / A / LINE / A / LONE".

== Bibliography ==
=== Poetry ===
- Cycles Etc. (Cleveland: 7 Flowers Press, 1965)
- Scraptures: second sequence (Toronto: Ganglia Press, 1965)
- Journeying & the returns (Toronto: Coach House, 1967)
- Konfessions of an Elizabethan Fan Dancer (London: Writers Forum, 1967; Toronto: Weed/Flower Press, 1973; Toronto: Coach House Books, 2004)
- Still Water (Vancouver: Talonbooks, 1970)
- The other side of the room (Toronto: Weed/Flower Press, 1971)
- Monotones (Vancouver: Talonbooks, 1971)
- The Captain Poetry Poems (blewointment press, 1971; Toronto: BookThug, 2011)
- The Martyrology, Books 1 & 2 (Toronto: Coach House, 1972)
- Love: A Book of Remembrances (Vancouver: Talonbooks, 1974)
- The Martyrology, Books 3 & 4 (Toronto: Coach House, 1976)
- Selected Writing: as elected (Vancouver: Talonbooks, 1980)
- The Martyrology, Book 5 (Toronto: Coach House, 1982)
- First Screening (Calgary: Red Deer College Press, 1984; vispo.com)
- Zygal: a book of mysteries & translations (Toronto: Coach House, 1985)
- The Martyrology, Book 6 Books (Toronto: Coach House, 1987)
- Gifts: the Martyrology Book(s) 7 & (Toronto: Coach House, 1990)
- Ad Sanctos: the Martyrology Book 9 – a performance work with Howard Gerhard (Toronto: Coach House, 1993)
- Truth: a book of Fictions (Toronto: Mercury Press, 1993. Irene Niechoda, ed.)
- Art Facts: a book of contexts (Arizona: Chax Press, 1990)
- a book of variations: love-zygal-art facts (Toronto: Coach House, 2013. Stephen Voyce, ed.)
- bp: beginnings (Toronto: BookThug, 2014. Stephen Cain, ed.)

=== Booklets ===
- Scraptures: 2nd Sequence (Toronto: Ganglia Press, 1965)
- The Birth of O (Toronto: Ganglia Press, 1966)
- Cold Mountain (Toronto: Ganglia Press, Singing Hands Series 3, 1966; Toronto: Coach House Press, 1967; Vancouver: Fingerprinting Inkoperated, 1992)
- Ruth (Toronto: Fleye Press, 1967; Hamilton: MindWare, 1993)
- Ballads of the Restless Are (Sacramento: The Runcible Spoon Press, 1968)
- Lament (Toronto: Ganglia Press, 1969; London, England, Writers Foum, 1969)
- The true eventual story of Billy the Kid (Toronto: Weed/Flower Press, 1970)
- Beach Head (Sacramento: Runcible Spoon, 1970)
- ABC: the Aleph Beth Book (Toronto: Oberon Press, 1971)
- Grease Ball Comics 2 (Toronto: Ganglia Press, 1972)
- Aleph Unit (Toronto: Seripress, 1973)
- White Sound : a variant (Toronto: Ganglia Press, 1976)
- Scraptures 2nd Sequence: Alternate Takes (Vancouver: BCMonthly, 1977)
- Alphhabet Ilphbet (Toronto: Seripress, 1978)
- Translating translating Apollinaire: a preliminary report (Milwaukee: Membrane press, 1979)
- The Story of the Boat People (Toronto: Operation Lifeline, 1980)
- Extreme Positions (Edmonton: Longspoon Press, 1981)
- Continental Trance (Lantzville, BC: Oolichan books, 1982)
- The Frog Variations (Toronto: Curvd H&z, 1983)
- Transformational Unit (self-published in 1983 as a Christmas gift)
- continuum (Toronto: Underwhich Editions, 1984)
- Critical Frame of Reference (Toronto, Pataphysical Hardware Company, 1985; reprinted 1992)
- 8 Lines on/of/as H's + 2 Alpha Pairings (Toronto: Letters, 1986; reprinted 1994)
- Librarians Need A Break (Toronto: Underwhich Editions, 1987)
- Bored Messengers (Prince George, B.C: Gorse Press, 1988)
- Back Lane Letters (Toronto: Letters, 1994)
- Holiday (Ottawa: Curvd H&z, 1999)

=== Prose ===
- Two Novels (Toronto: Coach House, 1971)
- Craft Dinner (Aya Press, 1978)
- Journal (Toronto: Coach House, 1978)
- Still (Vancouver: Pulp Press, winner of the 3-day novel writing contest 1983)
- Selected Organs: parts of an autobiography (Windsor: Black Moss Press, 1988)
- McCaffery, Steve & bpNichol (1992). Rational geomancy : the kids of the book-machine : the collected research reports of the Toronto Research Group, 1973-1982. Vancouver: Talonbooks.
- organ music: parts of an autobiography ( Windsor: Black Moss Press, 2015)
- Trois Contes de l'ouest (Quebec: Le Quartanier, 2015. Christophe Bernard, translator)

=== Television credits ===
- Fraggle Rock (Henson & Associates & CBC TV, 1984–1987)
- Under the Umbrella Tree (Noreen Young Productions & CBC Television, 1986–1987)
- The Raccoons (Evergreen Raccoons Ltd, 1986)
- Care Bears; Babar (TV series) (Nelvana Studios, 1986–1988)
- Blizzard Island (Studio East & CBC Television, 1985–1988)

=== Critical studies and reviews of Nichol's work ===
Rational geomancy

- Mann, Paul (Spring 1994). "A poetics of its own occasion". Contemporary Literature. 35 (1): 171–181. doi:10.2307/1208741. JSTOR 1208741.

== Related books ==
- bpNichol: What History Teaches (Stephen Scobie, Talonbooks, 1984)
- Read the Way he writes: A festschrift for bpNichol (Open Letter, Sixth Series, No. 5-6, 1986)
- Tracing the Paths: Reading ≠ Writing the Martyrology (Line Magazine, No. 10 & Talonbooks, 1988)
- Rational Geomancy: the collected research reports of the Toronto Research Group 1973-1982 (Steve McCaffery & bpNichol, Talonbooks, 1992)
- A Sourcery for Books 1&2 of bpNichol's Martyrology (Irene Niechoda, ECW Press, 1992)
- Meanwhile: the critical writings of bpNichol (Roy Miki, ed., Talonbooks, 1992)
- An H in the Heart: bpNichol: A Reader (George Bowering & Michael Ondaatje ed., McClelland & Stewart, 1994.)
- bpNichol Comics (Carl Peters, ed., Talonbooks, 2002)
- The Alphabet Game: a bpNichol Reader (Darren Wershler-Henry & Lori Emerson, ed., Coach House Books, 2007)

== See also ==
- Canadian literature
- Canadian poetry
- List of Canadian poets
