= Sound poetry =

Artistic form bridging literacy and musical composition

Sound poetry is an artistic form bridging literary and musical composition, in which the phonetic aspects of human speech are foregrounded instead of more conventional semantic and syntactic values; "verse without words". By definition, sound poetry is intended primarily for performance.

== History and development ==
=== 20th century ===
While it is sometimes argued that the roots of sound poetry are to be found in oral poetry traditions, the writing of pure sound texts that downplay the roles of meaning and structure is a 20th-century phenomenon. The Futurist and Dadaist Vanguards of the beginning of this century were the pioneers in creating the first sound poetry forms. Filippo Tommaso Marinetti discovered that onomatopoeias were useful to describe a battle in Tripoli where he was a soldier, creating a sound text that became a sort of a spoken photograph of the battle. Dadaists were more involved in sound poetry and they invented different categories:

- Bruitist poem: a phonetic poem, not so different from the futurist poem. Invented by Richard Huelsenbeck.
- Simultaneous poem: a poem read in different languages, with different rhythms, tonalities, and by different persons at the same time. Invented by Tristan Tzara.
- Movement poem: a poem accompanied by primitive movements.

=== Later developments ===
Sound poetry evolved into visual poetry and concrete poetry, two forms based in visual arts issues although the sound images are always very compelling in them. Later, with the development of the magnetic tape recorder, sound poetry evolved thanks to the upcoming of the concrete music movement at the end of the 1940s. Some sound poetics were used by later poetry movements like the Beat Generation in the fifties or the spoken word movement in the 80's, and by other art and music movements that brought up new forms such as text sound art that may be used for sound poems which more closely resemble "fiction or even essays, as traditionally defined, than poetry".

=== Early examples ===
Das Große Lalulá (1905) by Christian Morgenstern, in the collection Galgenlieder.

Kroklokwafzi? Semememi!
Seiokrontro – prafriplo:
Bifzi, bafzi; hulalemi:
quasti basti bo...
Lalu lalu lalu lalu la!

Hontraruru miromente
zasku zes rü rü?
Entepente, leiolente
klekwapufzi lü?
Lalu lalu lalu lalu la!

Simarar kos malzipempu
silzuzankunkrei (;)!
Marjomar dos: Quempu Lempu
Siri Suri Sei [ ]!
Lalu lalu lalu lalu la!

Zang Tumb Tumb (1914) is a sound poem and concrete poem by Italian futurist F. T. Marinetti.

Hugo Ball performed a piece of sound poetry in a reading at Cabaret Voltaire in 1916:

"I created a new species of verse, 'verse without words,' or sound poems....I recited the following:

gadji beri bimba
glandridi lauli lonni cadori..."

(Albright, 2004)

Kurt Schwitters' Ursonate (1922–32, "Primal Sonata") is a particularly well known early example:

The first movement rondo's principal theme being a word, "fmsbwtözäu" pronounced Fümms bö wö tää zää Uu, from a 1918 poem by Raoul Hausmann, apparently also a sound poem. Schwitters also wrote a less well-known sound poem consisting of the sound of the letter W. (Albright, 2004)

Chilean Vicente Huidobro's explores phonetic mutations of words in his book "Altazor" (1931).

In his story The Poet at Home, William Saroyan refers to a character who practices a form of pure poetry, composing verse of her own made-up words.

== Female practitioners ==
It has been argued that "there is a paucity of information on women's involvement in sound poetry, whether as practitioners, theorists, or even simply as listeners". Among the earliest female practitioners are Berlin poet Else Lasker-Schüler, who experimented in what she called "Ursprache" (Ur-language), and the New York Dada poet and performer Baroness Elsa von Freytag-Loringhoven. The Baroness's poem "Klink-Hratzvenga (Death-wail)" was published in The Little Review in March 1920 to great controversy. Written in response to her husband Leopold von Freytag-Loringhoven's suicide, the sound poem was "a mourning song in nonsense sounds that transcended national boundaries". The Baroness was also known for her sexually charged sound poetry, as seen in "Teke Heart (Beating of Heart)", only recently published.

Europe has produced sound poets in the persons of Greta Monach (Netherlands) and Katalin Ladik (Hungary), who released an EP of her work, "Phonopoetica", in 1976. In England, Paula Claire has been working with improvisational sound since the 1960s. Lily Greenham, born in Vienna in 1924 and later based in Denmark, Paris and London, developed a so-called neo-semantic approach during the 1970s. She coined the term 'Lingual Music' to describe her electroacoustic experiments with tape recordings of her voice. During the 1950s she became involved with the Wiener Gruppe (Vienna Group) and was an accomplished performer of sound & concrete poetry by many artists such as Alain Arias-Misson, Bob Cobbing, Gerhard Rühm, and Ernst Jandl. This was due in part to her training as an operatic singer and the fact that she was fluent in eight languages. Lingual Music, a double CD collection of her work, was released posthumously in 2007 by Paradigm Discs in the UK. Her archive is now held at Goldsmiths, University of London.

The United States has produced accomplished sound poets as well: Tracie Morris, from Brooklyn, New York, began presenting sound poetry in the mid-1990s. Her live and installation sound poetry has been featured in numerous venues including the Whitney Biennial in 2002. Experimental vocalist and composer Joan La Barbara has also successfully explored the realm of sound poetry. Composer Beth Anderson has been featured on several sound poetry anthologies such as "10+2: 12 American Text Sound Pieces" (1975) and the Italian 3vitre series. Other women practicing sound poetry in the US were, for instance, the Japanese artist Yoko Ono, Laurie Anderson and the Australian poet Ada Verdun Howell.

The online mixtape "A Sound Poetry Mix Tape" (2021) features excerpts by over thirty female sound poets.

== Other examples of sound poets ==
Later prominent sound poets include Henri Chopin, Bob Cobbing, Ada Verdun Howell, bpNichol, Bill Bissett, Adeena Karasick, William S. Burroughs, Giovanni Fontana, Bernard Heidsieck, Enzo Minarelli, François Dufrene, Mathias Goeritz, Maurizio Nannucci, Andras Petocz, Joan La Barbara, Paul Dutton, multidisciplinary artists Jeremy Adler, Jean-Jacques Lebel, John Giorno, Steve Dalachinsky, Yoko Ono, and Jaap Blonk.

The poet Edith Sitwell coined the term abstract poetry to describe some of her own poems which possessed more aural than literary qualities, rendering them essentially meaningless: "The poems in Façade are abstract poems—that is, they are patterns of sound. They are...virtuoso exercises in technique of extreme difficulty, in the same sense as that in which certain studies by Liszt are studies in transcendental technique in music." (Sitwell, 1949)

An early Dutch artist, Theo van Doesburg, was another prominent sound poet in the early 1900s.

The comedian and musician Reggie Watts often uses sound poetry as an improvisational technique in his performances, used with the intent to disorient his audience.

== Theories ==
In their essay "Harpsichords Metallic Howl—", Irene Gammel and Suzanne Zelazo review the theories of sound by Charles Bernstein, Gerald Bruns, Min-Quian Ma, Rachel Blau DuPlessis, Jeffrey McCaffery and others to argue that sonic poetry foregrounds its own corporality. Thus "the Baroness's sound poems let her body speak[;] through her expansive use of sound, the Baroness conveys the fluidity of gender as a constantly changing, polysemous signifier." In this way, somatic art becomes the poet's own "space-sound."

Of course, for many dadaists, such as Hugo Ball, sound poetry also presented a language of trauma, a cacophony used to protest the sound of the cannons of World War I. It was as T. J. Demos writes, "a telling stutter, a nervous echolalia."

== See also ==
- Abstract art and asemic writing—equivalents in the visual arts
- Angel Exhaust
- Bob Cobbing
- Crosstalk: American Speech Music
- Electroacoustic music
- Jas H. Duke
- Magma (band)
- Line (music)
- Line (poetry)
- Phonaesthetics
- Scat singing
- Sound art
- Tracie Morris

== Sources ==
- Albright, Daniel (2004). Modernism and Music: An Anthology of Sources. University of Chicago Press. ISBN 0-226-01267-0.
- Sitwell, Edith (1949). The Canticle of the Rose Poems: 1917–1949, p.xii. New York: Vanguard Press.
