= Film, television, and radio career of Audie Murphy =

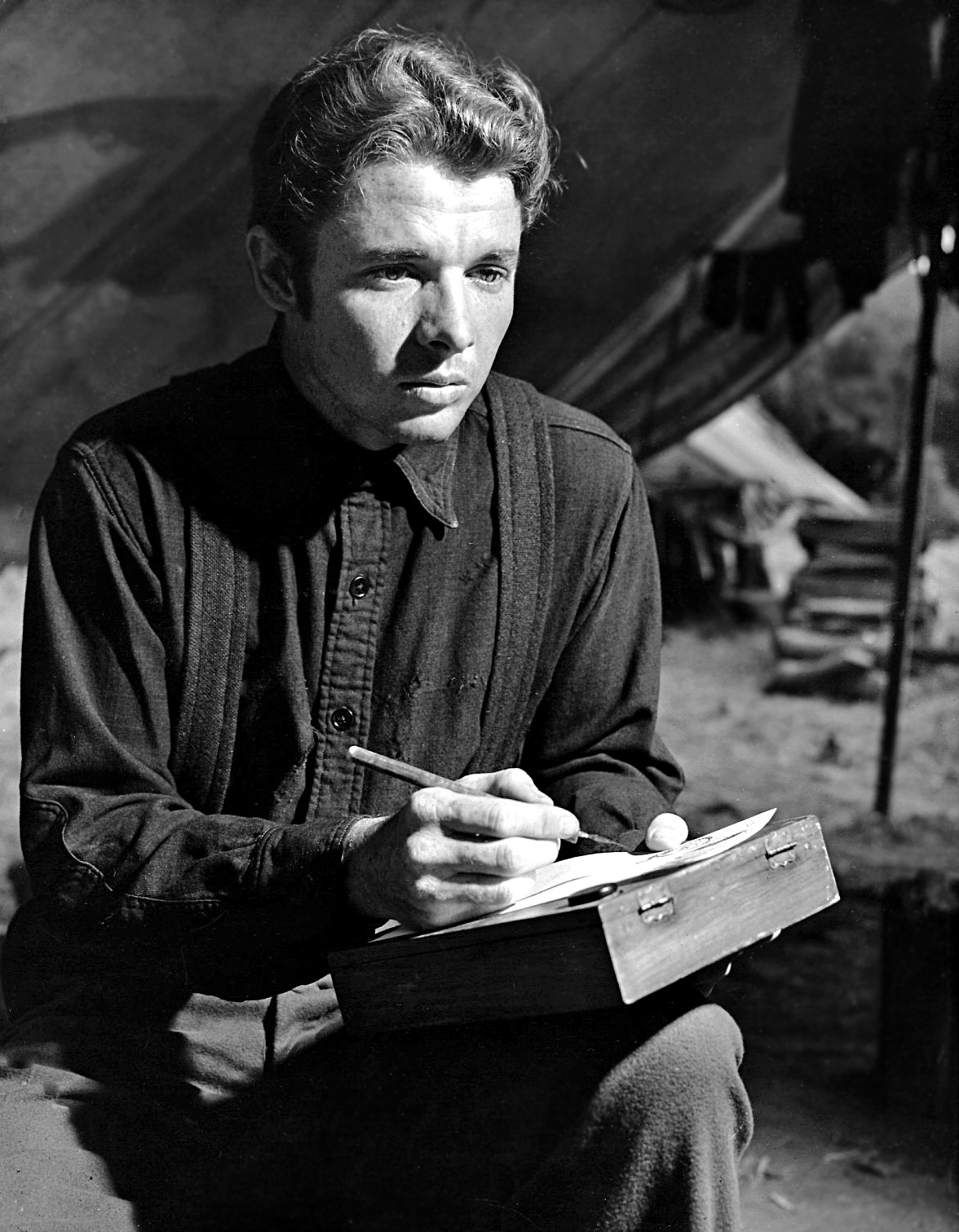
Red Badge of Courage (1951)

Audie Murphy (20 June 1925 – 28 May 1971) was a highly decorated American soldier and Medal of Honor recipient who turned actor. He portrayed himself in the film To Hell and Back, the account of his World War II experiences. During the 1950s and 1960s he was cast primarily in westerns. While often the hero, he proved his ability to portray a cold-blooded hired gun in No Name on the Bullet. A notable exception to the westerns was The Quiet American in which he co-starred with Michael Redgrave. Murphy made over 40 feature films and often worked with directors more than once. Jesse Hibbs who directed To Hell and Back worked with the star on six films, only half of which were westerns. When promoting his 1949 book To Hell and Back he appeared on the radio version of This Is Your Life. To promote the 1955 film of the same name, he appeared on Ed Sullivan's Toast of the Town. He was a celebrity guest on television shows such as What's My Line? and appeared in a handful of television dramas. Murphy's only television series Whispering Smith had a brief run in 1961. For his cooperation in appearing in the United States Army's Broken Bridge episode of The Big Picture television series he was awarded the Outstanding Civilian Service Medal.

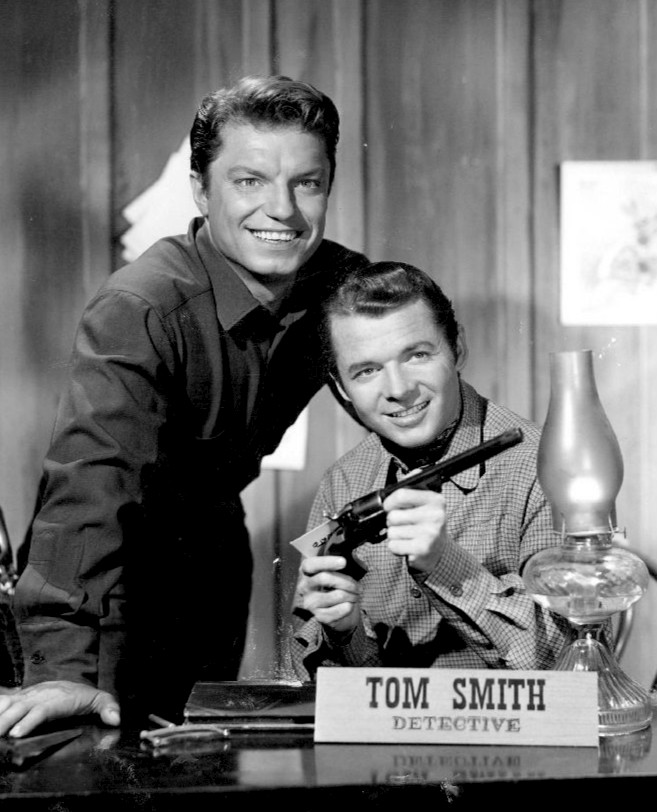
A photo of Guy Mitchell and Audie Murphy in Whispering Smith

== Early career ==
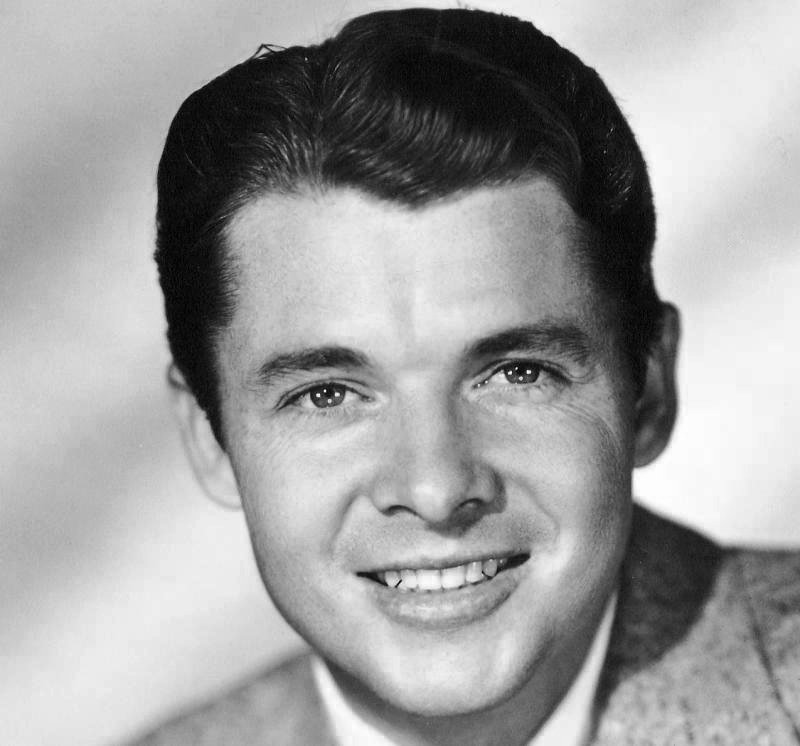
Audie Murphy publicity photo

Murphy became a national celebrity following his World War II military service when Life magazine proclaimed him America's "most decorated soldier" in its 16 July 1945 issue cover story. That magazine cover brought him to the attention of veteran actor James Cagney who invited him to Hollywood. When Murphy arrived in California after his military discharge, Cagney cancelled the hotel reservations he'd made for Murphy and instead took him into his own home, "I got the shock of my life. Audie was very thin. His complexion was bluish-gray." Commenting years later on his first impression, Cagney said, "[Murphy was] in such a nervous condition that I was afraid he might jump out of a window. I took him home and gave him my bed." He spent three weeks as a guest of Cagney and then returned to Texas before finally agreeing to an offer from brothers James and William Cagney of $150 a week as a contract player with their production company. The Cagneys gave Murphy personal attention on acting techniques. He also took lessons at the Actors' Lab on Sunset Boulevard. Murphy studied voice techniques, learned judo, and trained with choreographer John Boyle, Cagney's dance coach for Yankee Doodle Dandy. A 1947 disagreement with William Cagney ended his association with the brothers without having been cast in a film production.

He moved into Terry Hunt's Athletic Club and survived on his Army pension of $113 a month. In 1948 he became acquainted with writer David "Spec" McClure who got him a $500 bit part in Texas, Brooklyn & Heaven. He began dating actress Wanda Hendrix in 1946. Her agent got Murphy a bit part in the 1948 Alan Ladd film Beyond Glory directed by John Farrow. Murphy and Hendrix married in 1949 and divorced in 1951.

His 1949 film Bad Boy gave him his first leading role. Murphy became acquainted in Texas with Interstate Theatre executive James "Skipper" Cherry, who was best man at Murphy's 1951 marriage to Pamela Archer and the namesake of the couple's second son. Murphy's association with Cherry brought him to the attention of Texas independent producer Paul Short. With financing from Texas theater owners and the children's charitable organization Variety Clubs International, Short cast Murphy in Bad Boy to help promote the charity's work with troubled children. Murphy performed well in the screen test, but Steve Broidy, president of the project's production company Allied Artists did not want to cast someone in a major role with so little acting experience. Cherry, Short, and the theater owners refused to finance the film unless Murphy played the lead. The 1933 Thames Williamson novel The Woods Colt caught Murphy's attention during this period of his career. He secured the rights to the story in the 1950s, and Marion Hargrove was hired to write the script. The film was never made.

Universal Studios signed Murphy to a seven-year studio contract at $2,500 a week. His first film for them in 1950 was as Billy the Kid in The Kid from Texas. He wrapped up that year making Sierra starring his wife Wanda Hendrix, and Kansas Raiders as outlaw Jesse James. He and director Budd Boetticher become acquainted through Terry Hunt's Athletic Club where Murphy would request to be his boxing partner. Murphy appeared in the 1951 title role of Boetticher's first westernThe Cimarron Kid.

Audie Murphy tackles the role, and probably better fits the original Brand conception than his predecessors.

— Variety review of Destry

The only film Murphy made in 1952 was Duel At Silver Creek with director Don Siegel. Murphy would team with Siegel one more time in 1958 for The Gun Runners. He only worked one time with director Frederick de Cordova, who later became producer of The Tonight Show Starring Johnny Carson. Murphy and de Cordova made Column South in 1953. George Marshall directed Murphy in the 1954 Destry, based on a character created by author Max Brand. Two previous versions, one in 1932 with Tom Mix and one in 1939 with Jimmy Stewart and Marlene Dietrich, were both titled Destry Rides Again.

The only screenplay John Meredyth Lucas ever did for a Murphy film was the 1953 Tumbleweed, an adaptation of the Kenneth Perkins novel Three Were Renegades . Murphy played Jim Harvey, whose horse Tumbleweed displayed a talent for getting the hero out of any scrape. Director Nathan Juran oversaw Tumbleweed, as well as Gunsmoke and Drums Across the River.

As Murphy's film career began to progress, so did his efforts to improve his skills. He continually practiced his fast draw with a gun. When Hugh O'Brian bet $500 that he could draw a gun faster than anyone in Hollywood, Murphy raised the ante to $2500 and wanted to use live ammunition; O'Brian did not accept. He took both private and classroom acting lessons from Estelle Harman, and honed his diction by reciting dialogue from William Shakespeare and William Saroyan.

== The Red Badge of Courage ==
Murphy was lent to MGM at a salary of $25,000 to appear in the 1951 The Red Badge of Courage directed by John Huston and adapted from the Stephen Crane novel. At the urging of Spec McClure and celebrity columnist Hedda Hopper, over the misgivings of producer Gottfried Reinhardt and studio executives Louis B. Mayer and Dore Schary, director Huston cast Murphy in the lead of The Youth (Henry Fleming in the novel). The preview screening audiences were not enthusiastic, causing Schary to re-edit Huston's work, eliminating several scenes and adding narration by James Whitmore. MGM trimmed advertising efforts on what they believed was an unprofitable film. What eventually hit the theaters was not a commercial success, and it was also not the film both Murphy and Huston believed they had made. Murphy unsuccessfully tried to buy the rights to the film in 1955 in an attempt to re-edit and re-release it. Huston tried to buy it in 1957, but was told the original negative of what he had filmed was destroyed.

== To Hell and Back ==
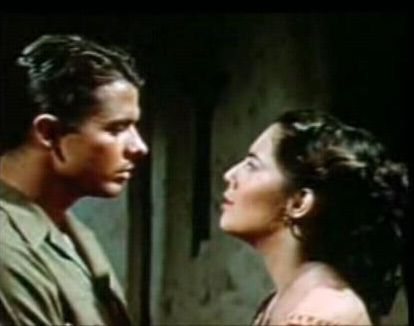
To Hell and Back – Audie Murphy and Susan Kohner

Although Murphy was initially reluctant to appear as himself in To Hell and Back, the film version of his book, he eventually agreed to do so. Terry Murphy portrayed his brother Joseph Preston Murphy at age four. The film was directed by Jesse Hibbs with an on-screen introduction by General Walter Bedell Smith. Susan Kohner, daughter of Murphy's agent Paul Kohner, made her acting debut in the film. The finale shows Murphy being awarded the Medal of Honor while images of his unit's casualties pass across the screen. It became the biggest hit in the history of Universal Studios at the time.

Both Murphy and Universal gave serious considerations to a follow-up version of his post-war life. Murphy rejected the Richard J. Collins script The Way Back which created the fictional scenario that filming To Hell and Back had been so therapeutic for Murphy that it cured him of his combat fatigue. Spec McClure scripted a second unused version of The Way Back that incorporated Murphy's real-life friends into the storyline and ended with the star living happily ever after with Pamela and their two sons. A third version by an unknown writer focused on the Murphy-McClure friendship and was rejected by the threat of a lawsuit from McClure. Desi Arnaz offered to bankroll a 1965 project titled Helmets in the Dust. At Murphy's request McClure wrote a film treatment, but the project never came to fruition.

== Later films ==
The Hibbs-Murphy team proved so successful in To Hell and Back that the two worked together on a total of five subsequent films. Hibbs directed Murphy in Ride Clear of Diablo in 1954. The partnership resulted in the commercially unsuccessful non-traditional 1956 western Walk the Proud Land. Hibbs and Murphy teamed with each other for non-westerns Joe Butterfly and World in My Corner. They worked together a final time in the 1958 western Ride a Crooked Trail. Veteran character actor Dan Duryea who portrayed villain Whitey Kincaide in Ride Clear of Diablo played a second lead in two more Murphy vehicles, Night Passage and Six Black Horses. The Story of Charles Russell with Murphy as the lead was under development at Universal but shelved after the disappointing receipts of Walk the Proud Land. Murphy, however, was enthusiastic enough about a biopic of Charles Marion Russell to give serious consideration tor his own production that would star Guy Mitchell in the lead, but the film was not made.

Murphy was hired by Joseph L. Mankiewicz to play the role of The American (Alden Pyle in the book) in the 1958 version of The Quiet American, replacing Montgomery Clift when the latter dropped out. Michael Redgrave replaced Laurence Olivier who dropped out when Clift withdrew. The cold-war drama filmed in Vietnam was a departure from the genre in which Murphy had normally been cast.

Murphy formed a partnership with Harry Joe Brown to make three films, the first of which was the 1957 The Guns of Fort Petticoat. The partnership fell into disagreement over the remaining two projects, and Brown filed suit against Murphy. Although Murphy was to co-star with Robert Mitchum in the 1957 film Night Riders, scheduling conflicts prevented him from doing so. Springing from his skin diving hobby, Murphy hired diving expert Paul Kazear to write the script Skin Diver with a Heart . Murphy reneged on the deal and the film was never made. Kazear sued Murphy in 1958.

The 1950s ended with Murphy appearing in three westerns. He co-starred with 14-year-old Sandra Dee in the 1959 film The Wild and the Innocent. The film's cast was rounded out with Gilbert Roland, Joanne Dru and Jim Backus. Murphy's collaboration with Walter Mirisch on Cast a Long Shadow included an uncredited stint as co-producer. The film co-starred Terry Moore. His performance in No Name on the Bullet was well received. The storyline follows the cool, jaded hired gun as the townspeople are gripped with fear by his presence.

Murphy ... uncorks a toughness and maturity that is a powerful aid to the story.

— The Hollywood Reporter review of The Unforgiven

Murphy and Huston worked together one more time in the 1960 film The Unforgiven, in which Murphy took second billing as Burt Lancaster's racist kid brother who was bent on the destruction of the Kiowa. Writer Clair Huffaker wrote the screenplay for 1961's Seven Ways from Sundown and Posse from Hell. Author Bob Herzberg deemed the scripts two of the best Murphy worked with in that decade. Herbert Coleman directed Posse from Hell as well as the World War II drama Battle at Bloody Beach set in the Philippines.

Willard W. Willingham and his wife, Mary, were friends of Murphy's from his earliest days in Hollywood and who worked with him on a number of projects. Williard was a producer on Murphy's 1961 television series Whispering Smith. He additionally collaborated on Bullet for a Badman in 1964 and Arizona Raiders in 1965. The latter was based on activities of Quantrill's Raiders and was a remake of the George Montgomery 1951 film The Texas Rangers . The film also featured Buster Crabbe. Willard was a co-writer on the screenplay for Battle at Bloody Beach. The Willinghams as a team wrote the screenplays for Gunpoint as well the script for Murphy's last starring lead in a western, 40 Guns to Apache Pass . Released through Columbia Pictures in May 1967, the story centered on Murphy's character retrieving a cache of stolen rifles sold to Apache leader Cochise.

Apache Rifles in 1964 was another formula Murphy western. He remained at Universal for a few more years, then left to work at Columbia and Allied Artists before making several films in Europe. In 1966 he made Trunk to Cairo in Israel. He felt the film was, "the worst James Bond parody I've ever seen," but was unable to get out of the commitment.

I feel like a prostitute who is a little over the hill. I get all kinds of promotional offers for movies. But instead of my usual price of $100,000 per picture, they offer $20,000 and a percentage of the profit you never see. When people find you need the money in this town, they cut their offer by 80 percent. And I keep turning down liquor and cigarette commercials. I don't believe they're good for kids. I guess it's a matter of not being 100 percent prostitute.

— Audie Murphy, 1968

His own company FIPCO Productions produced his last film A Time for Dying . He had a cameo role as Jesse James, and his sons Terry and James were given small roles. Willard W. Willingham played Frank James. Budd Boetticher wrote the script, and agreed to the production as a return favor for an earlier time when Murphy had bailed him out of financial setbacks. The production was beset with financial problems, and the set burned twice. The movie opened in France in 1971 but was not shown in the United States until its limited release in 1982. Two other projects that Murphy and Boetticher planned to produce, A Horse for Mr Barnum and When There's Sumpthin' to Do, never came to fruition.

Murphy made more than 40 feature films in his career. (Note: The exact number varies by source. The Hollywood Walk of Fame and other sources put his total at 44.)

== Films ==
Title	Year	Role	Director	Producer	Studio	Other cast members	Refs.
Texas, Brooklyn & Heaven	1948	Copy Boy	William Castle	Robert Golden	United Artists	James Dunn, William Frawley, Margaret Hamilton, Roscoe Karns, Diana Lynn, Guy Madison, Irene Ryan, Lionel Stander	
Beyond Glory	1948	Cadet Thomas	John Farrow	Robert Fellows	Paramount	Alan Ladd, Donna Reed	
Bad Boy	1949	Danny Lester	Kurt Neumann	Paul Short	Monogram	James Gleason, Jimmy Lydon, Lloyd Nolan, Martha Vickers, Rhys Williams, Jane Wyatt	
The Kid from Texas	1950	William Bonney	Kurt Neumann	Paul Short	Universal	Albert Dekker, Will Geer, Gale Storm, William Talman, Ray Teal, Frank Wilcox	(Note: The Kid From Texas is the final movie shown at the local theater in Larry McMurty's novel The Last Picture Show.)
Sierra	1950	Ring Hassard	Alfred E. Green	Michael Kraike	Universal	James Arness, Tony Curtis, Wanda Hendrix, Burl Ives, Dean Jagger, Elliott Reid, Roy Roberts	
Kansas Raiders	1950	Jesse James	Ray Enright	Ted Richmond	Universal	Richard Arlen, James Best, Scott Brady, Tony Curtis, Brian Donlevy, Richard Long	
The Red Badge of Courage	1951	The Youth	John Huston	Gottfried Reinhardt	MGM	Royal Dano, Andy Devine, Douglas Dick, John Dierkes, Arthur Hunnicutt, Bill Mauldin	(Note: Henry Fleming is the Youth in Stephen Crane's novel. In the 1951 film, Fleming is played by Murphy shown in the cast listing as the unnamed character "The Youth". However, Fleming is addressed by name when other characters are speaking to him.)
The Cimarron Kid	1951	Bill Doolin a.k.a. The Cimarron Kid	Budd Boetticher	Ted Richmond	Universal	Noah Beery Jr, James Best, Leif Erickson, Hugh O'Brian, Roy Roberts, Frank Silvera	
The Duel at Silver Creek	1952	Luke Cromwell a.k.a. The Silver Kid	Don Siegel	Leonard Goldstein	Universal	Susan Cabot, Faith Domergue, Lee Marvin, Gerald Mohr	
Gunsmoke	1953	Reb Kittredge	Nathan Juran	Aaron Rosenberg	Universal	Susan Cabot, Jack Kelly, Jesse White	
Column South	1953	Lt. Jed Sayre	Frederick De Cordova	Ted Richmond	Universal	James Best, Ray Collins, Joan Evans, Russell Johnson, Jack Kelly, Bob Steele, Robert Sterling, Dennis Weaver	
Tumbleweed	1953	Jim Harvey	Nathan Juran	Ross Hunter	Universal	King Donovan, Russell Johnson, Lori Nelson, Roy Roberts, Lyle Talbot, Lee Van Cleef, Chill Wills	
Ride Clear of Diablo	1954	Clay O'Mara	Jesse Hibbs	John W. Rogers	Universal	Susan Cabot, Dan Duryea, Jack Elam, Abbe Lane, Russell Johnson, Denver Pyle	
Drums Across the River	1954	Gary Brannon	Nathan Juran	Melville Tucker	Universal	Morris Ankrum, Lane Bradford, Walter Brennan, Lisa Gaye, Howard McNear, Jay Silverheels, Bob Steele	
Destry	1954	Tom Destry	George Marshall	Stanley Rubin	Universal	Edgar Buchanan, Mari Blanchard, Wallace Ford, Alan Hale, Jr., Thomas Mitchell, Lori Nelson, Mary Wickes	
To Hell and Back	1955	Himself	Jesse Hibbs	Aaron Rosenberg	Universal	Charles Drake, David Janssen, Jack Kelly, Susan Kohner, Denver Pyle, Marshall Thompson	
World in My Corner	1956	Tommy Shea	Jesse Hibbs	Aaron Rosenberg	Universal	John McIntire, Jeff Morrow, Barbara Rush	
Walk the Proud Land	1956	John Philip Clum	Jesse Hibbs	Aaron Rosenberg	Universal	Morris Ankrum, Anne Bancroft, Anthony Caruso, Pat Crowley, Charles Drake, Jay Silverheels	
Joe Butterfly	1957	Pvt. Joe Woodley	Jesse Hibbs	Aaron Rosenberg	Universal	John Agar, Fred Clark, Burgess Meredith, George Nader, Keenan Wynn	
The Guns of Fort Petticoat	1957	Lt. Frank Hewitt	George Marshall	Harry Joe Brown; Audie Murphy	Columbia	Kathryn Grant, Sean McClory, Jeanette Nolan, Ray Teal	
Night Passage	1957	Lee McLaine a.k.a. The Utica Kid	James Neilson	Aaron Rosenberg	Universal	Hugh Beaumont, Ellen Corby, Brandon deWilde, Dan Duryea, Jack Elam, Jay C. Flippen, James Stewart	
The Quiet American	1958	The American	Joseph L. Mankiewicz	Joseph L. Mankiewicz	United Artists	Bruce Cabot, Claude Dauphin, Richard Loo, Giorgia Moll, Michael Redgrave	(Note: Alden Pyle is the American in Graham Greene's novel. In the 1958 film, Pyle is played by Murphy as the unnamed character "The American".)
Ride a Crooked Trail	1958	Joe Maybe	Jesse Hibbs	Howard Pine	Universal	Leo Gordon, Walter Matthau, Mort Mills, Joanna Cook Moore, Gia Scala, Henry Silva	
The Gun Runners	1958	Sam Martin	Don Siegel	Herbert E. Stewart; Clarence Greene	Seven Arts	Eddie Albert, Jack Elam, Richard Jaeckel, Patricia Owens, Everett Sloane	
No Name on the Bullet	1959	John Gant	Jack Arnold	Jack Arnold; Howard Christie	Universal	R.G. Armstrong, Charles Drake, Joan Evans, Virginia Grey, Warren Stevens, Karl Swenson	
The Wild and the Innocent	1959	Yancy Hawks	Jack Sher	Sy Gomberg	Universal	Jim Backus, Peter Breck, Sandra Dee, Joanne Dru, Strother Martin, Gilbert Roland	
Cast a Long Shadow	1959	Matt Brown	Thomas Carr	Walter Mirisch; Audie Murphy	United Artists	James Best, John Dehner, Terry Moore, Denver Pyle	
The Unforgiven	1960	Cash Zachary	John Huston	James Hill	United Artists	Charles Bickford, Lillian Gish, Audrey Hepburn, Burt Lancaster, Doug McClure, Albert Salmi, John Saxon, Joseph Wiseman	
Hell Bent for Leather	1960	Clay Santell	George Sherman	Gordon Kay	Universal	Malcolm Atterbury, Felicia Farr, Allan Lane, Robert Middleton, Herbert Rudley, Bob Steele	
Seven Ways from Sundown	1960	Seven Ways from Sundown Jones	Harry Keller	Gordon Kay	Universal	Don Collier, Jack Kruschen, John McIntire, Venetia Stevenson, Barry Sullivan	(Note: The parents of Seven Ways from Sundown Jones gave their children numbers for names. Murphy's character was the last of seven children. The storyline has him seeking the killer of his brother Two Jones.)
Posse from Hell	1961	Banner Cole	Herbert Coleman	Gordon Kay	Universal	Rodolfo Acosta, Royal Dano, Zohra Lampert, Allan Lane, Vic Morrow, John Saxon, Ray Teal, Lee Van Cleef	
Battle at Bloody Beach	1961	Craig Benson	Herbert Coleman	Richard Maibaum	20th Century Fox	Gary Crosby, Ivan Dixon, Dolores Michaels, Alejandro Rey	
Six Black Horses	1962	Ben Lane	Harry Keller	Gordon Kay	Universal	Dan Duryea, Joan O'Brien, Bob Steele	
War is Hell	1962	Narrator	Burt Topper	Burt Topper	Allied Artists	Baynes Barron	
Showdown	1963	Chris Foster	R.G. Springsteen	Gordon Kay	Universal	Kathleen Crowley, Charles Drake, Skip Homeier, L. Q. Jones, Strother Martin, Harold J. Stone	
Gunfight at Comanche Creek	1963	Bob Gifford a.k.a. Judd Tanner	Frank McDonald	Ben Schwalb	Allied Artists	Ben Cooper, DeForest Kelley, Susan Seaforth	
The Quick Gun	1964	Clint Cooper	Sidney Salkow	Grant Whytock	Columbia	Merry Anders, James Best, Ted de Corsia, Frank Ferguson, Mort Mills	
Bullet for a Badman	1964	Logan Keliher	R.G. Springsteen	Gordon Kay	Universal	Alan Hale Jr., Skip Homeier, Ruta Lee, Darren McGavin, Beverley Owen, George Tobias	
Apache Rifles	1964	Captain Jeff Stanton	William Witney	Grant Whytock	20th Century Fox	John Archer, Michael Dante, L. Q. Jones, Linda Lawson, Ken Lynch	
Arizona Raiders	1965	Clint Stewart	William Witney	Grant Whytock	Columbia	Ben Cooper, Buster Crabbe, Michael Dante, Gloria Talbott	
Gunpoint	1966	Chad Lucas	Earl Bellamy	Gordon Kay	Universal	Edgar Buchanan, Royal Dano, Denver Pyle, Joan Staley, Warren Stevens, Morgan Woodward	
The Texican	1966	Jess Carlin	Lesley Selander	John Champion; Bruce Balaban	Columbia	Broderick Crawford	
Trunk to Cairo	1966	Mike Merrick	Menahem Golan	Menahem Golan	American International	Marianne Koch, George Sanders	
40 Guns to Apache Pass	1967	Captain Bruce Coburn	William Witney	Grant Whytock	Columbia	Laraine Stephens	
A Time for Dying	1969	Jesse James	Budd Boetticher	Audie Murphy	FIPCO Productions	Burt Mustin, Victor Jory	

== Television ==
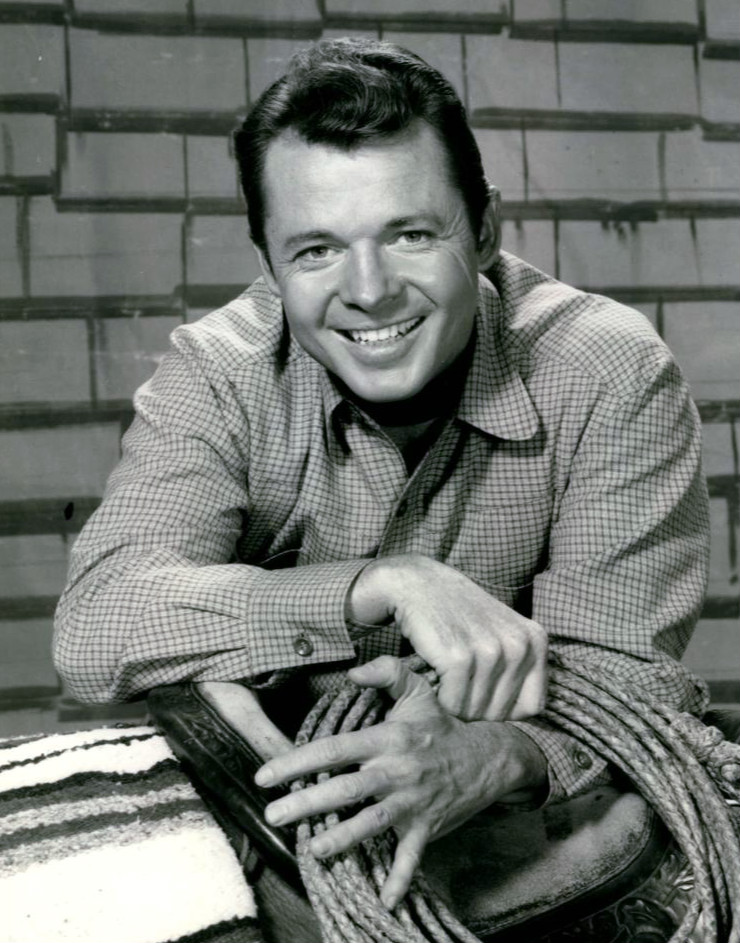
Audie Murphy as Whispering Smith

The only television series Murphy starred in was the 1961 Whispering Smith in which he played the title character. Based on the film of the same name, the show was about a 19th-century Denver railroad investigator. Episodes were gleaned from real-life cases of the Denver Police Department. The United States Senate Subcommittee on Juvenile Delinquency was concerned about the violent content in the show and leveled charges against the network. 26 episodes had been filmed, but not all of them aired.

The cooperation of the United States Army and the United States Defense Department was extended for Murphy's media appearances to publicize the film To Hell and Back. Among the 1955 celebrity television shows on which Murphy appeared to promote the film was Toast of the Town hosted by Ed Sullivan.

The Man, a 1960 suspense episode of Startime, was based on an original Broadway play written by Mel Dinelli. Murphy played a mentally unbalanced stranger who posed as a student and handyman and terrorized homeowner Thelma Ritter.

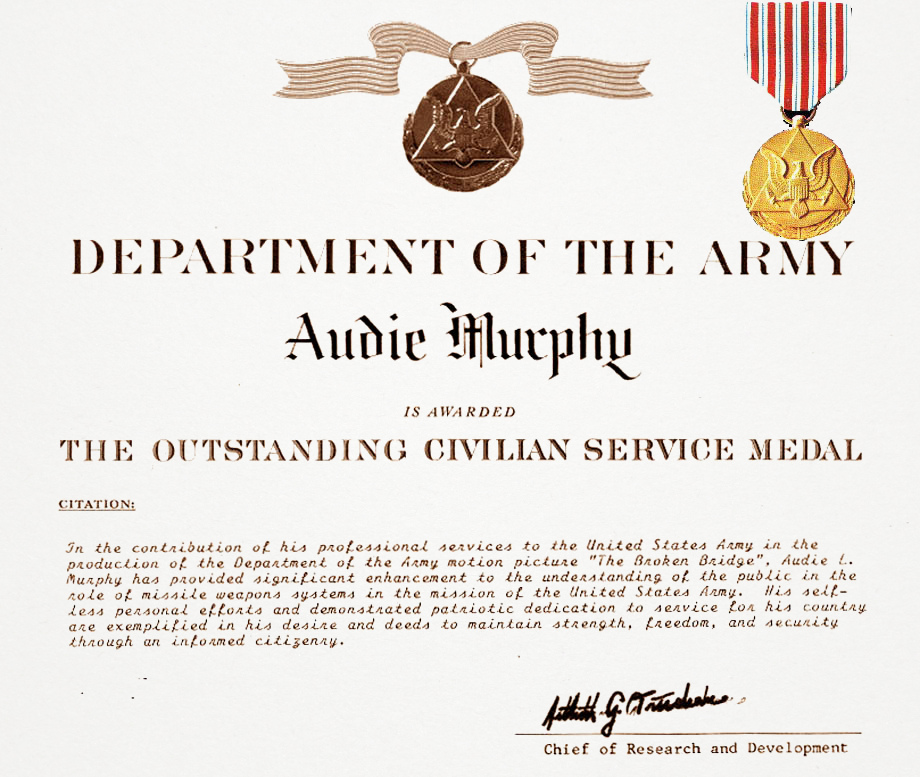
Outstanding Civilian Service Certificate

In 1960, he was awarded the Outstanding Civilian Service Medal for his cooperation in the production of The Big Picture television series episode Broken Bridge. (Note: Murphy received no monetary compensation for his services on the documentary.)

Title	Year	Role	Notes	Refs.
The Easter Seals Teleparade of Stars	1954	Self	18 April 1954	
Allen in Movieland	1955	Self	2 July 1955, NBC television special starring Steve Allen	
What's My Line?	1955	Mystery Guest	Episode 3 July 1955	(Note: YouTube has several uploaded versions of the 5-minute What's My Line segment that features Murphy as the mystery guest. Listed as Episode dated 3 July 1955 at IMDb)
Toast of the Town	1955	Self	Promotion of To Hell and Back film, with cooperation of the Dept. of the U.S. Army and the Dept. of Defense	
Colgate Comedy Hour	1955	Self	Episode 5.36	(Note: 56-minute uploaded on YouTube as Audie Murphy Attends Beverly Hilton Grand Opening 1955. He appears at 28:48 and briefly talks with Hedda Hopper about how he once gave his medals away but had them replaced by the U. S. Army.)
Suspicion	1957	Steve Gordon	The Flight	
You Asked for It	1958	Self		(Note: You Asked for It ran 1951–1959 on the Dumont and ABC television networks, with hosts Art Baker and Jack Smith. The episodes were in response to requests submitted by viewers. Murphy's episode features the star talking with host Jack Smith about his interest in quarter horses. Uploaded on YouTube.)
General Electric Theater	1958	Tennessee	Incident, a Civil War drama	
Dinah Shore Chevy Show	1959	Self	Episode 3.52	
The Big Picture	Unknown	Self	The Third Division in Korea	(Note: The Third Division in Korea is an episode of The Big Picture series of United States Army self-promotional documentaries offered at no cost to American television networks, beginning during the Korean War and continuing through the Vietnam War. The 27-minute documentary of the 3rd Infantry Division's involvement in the Korean War is introduced by Sergeant Stuart Queen and Murphy. At the end of the documentary, Murphy is seen in dress uniform speaking from a dais to the Division at the Port of New Orleans. Uploaded on YouTube.)
The Big Picture	1960	Self	Broken Bridge	(Note: Broken Bridge is an episode of The Big Picture series. In this episode the United States Army escorts Murphy to Germany, Italy, Turkey and the U.S. state of New Mexico to demonstrate their missile weaponry. Uploaded on YouTube. Listed as Audie Murphy in Nuremberg at IMDb.)
The Big Picture	1963	Self	Beyond the Call, Part II	(Note: Part of The Big Picture series, Beyond the Call is a black and white docudrama about Medal of Honor winners. Although the heroic actions are depicted, and each soldier's personal background is detailed, none of them are mentioned by name, including Murphy. Footage from the color film To Hell and Back depicting Murphy's actions at Holtzwihr is converted to black and white. Uploaded on YouTube.)
Startime	1960	Howard Wilton	The Man	
Whispering Smith	1961	Tom "Whispering" Smith	26 episodes	(Note: When Frank H. Spearman wrote the 1906 Whispering Smith novel, he appropriated the sobriquet already attached to real-life railroad detective James L. Smith. The 1948 film version with Alan Ladd changed the name to Luke Smith. Murphy's character in the television series became Tom Smith.)

== Radio ==
Title	Year	Role	Notes	Refs.
Hollywood Fights Back	1947	Self	26 October 1947	(Note: Hollywood Fights Back was produced as two 30-minute specials by the First Amendment Committee in 1947 for broadcast 26 October and 2 November on the ABC radio network. Numerous major film stars of the era appeared in the specials to express their opposition to the activities of the House Un-American Activities Committee. Murphy spoke in the 26 October broadcast.)
This Is Your Life	1949	Self	8 March 1949 episode (recorded on 7 March), hosted by Ralph Edwards	(Note: Publicity for To Hell and Back. The Audie Murphy Research Foundation has a user-generated reproduction of the full transcript of Murphy's appearance that was published in the June 1954 issue of Photoplay magazine.)
Cavalcade of America	1951	Walter Carlin	9 October 1951, Episode 713 The Fields are Green	(Note: Dramatization of the real-life story of Walter and William Carlin, who as teenagers turned an old farm into a success. It was broadcast in honor of the Future Farmers of America, and co-starred Bob Hastings, best known for his later recurring role in McHale's Navy.)

== Public Service Announcements ==
Title	Year	Role	Notes	Refs.
Medal of Honor (short)	1955	Self	Savings bond promotion	(Note: This public service announcement was written by Oscar Brodney and produced by Jesse Hibbs through Universal Studios for the U.S. Treasury Department. He talks to actors Barbara Rush, Barney Phillips and John McIntire about savings bonds. Terry Murphy also appears. Uploaded on YouTube as Audie Murphy Promotes Savings Bonds (PSA 1955).)
The National Security Committee Introduces Audie Murphy	1956	Self	Military recruitment promotion	(Note: Short 1956 public service announcement filmed for the National Security Committee to help promote their new 6-month reserve training program for the Armed Services. It was shown in theaters as a newsreel trailer during “Military Reserve Week” and was estimated to have been viewed by 38 million audience members. Universal Studios, along with Audie Murphy and director Jesse Hibbs, donated their time to the project.)
