= A Strange Adventure =

A Strange Adventure may refer to:

- A Strange Adventure (1932 film), an American mystery film
- A Strange Adventure (1956 film), an American crime film

== See also ==
- Strange Adventures, a series of American comic books published by DC Comics
