= Leo Brady =

American dramatist

Leo Brady (January 23, 1917 – November 18, 1984) was a multidimensional American writer and theater artist who also achieved great success as a teacher of young playwrights.

After writing some well-received plays as an undergrad at Catholic University of America in Washington, D.C., Brady published a play version of Richard Connell's short story Brother Orchid, which became a staple of the Samuel French catalog and inspired Hollywood to adapt the story for a film starring Edward G. Robinson. (Brady received no credit.) In collaboration with Walter Kerr, he wrote Yankee Doodle Boy, a musical about the life of Broadway showman George M. Cohan, which debuted to great success in Washington and received national media exposure along with the endorsement of Cohan himself. Again, Hollywood lifted this idea whole cloth without giving the authors credit, and subsequently released the film version, Yankee Doodle Dandy, starring James Cagney. Brady received his first major New York credit as the coauthor (again with Kerr) of a 1942 Broadway musical revue called Count Me In. After serving in World War II, where he continued creating as a writer and radio producer for the Army Recruitment Service, Brady returned to civilian life as a drama teacher at his alma mater. For a brief time he wrote film criticism for the Washington Post, while teaching, doing some acting and also beginning his career as a stage director.

In 1949, Brady published his first novel, Edge of Doom, which Samuel Goldwyn produced as a feature film in 1950. Directed by Mark Robson and with a screenplay by Philip Yordan, with post-primary scenes added by writers Ben Hecht and Charles Brackett and directed by Charles Vidor, the film was a rather notorious box office failure. The Hecht-Brackett rewrites, spurred on after the initial screening by the producer's fear that the movie was too bleak, attempted to turn a dark tale of a pathetic murder into some kind of hopeful Hollywood inspirational story. These changes—including a narration by a priest character and prologue and epilogue—were designed to gain the film wider audience appeal. The film still turns up now and then as an acknowledged curiosity piece in the film noir genre.

Brady, a Roman Catholic with a social conscience, followed up Edge of Doom with Signs and Wonders in 1953, yet another novel that criticized the church, in particular what he saw as the phony piety and narrowmindedness of so-called “professional” Catholics of the Knights of Columbus variety. Signs and Wonders received better reviews than his first book but failed to garner the same sales or public attention. Brady didn't write another novel for 20 years, then published The Quiet Gun, a literary western, and The Love Tap, a mystery, in the 1970s.

In the interim and beyond, Brady dedicated most of his energies to the theater while also turning out a few highly regarded scripts for socially and culturally relevant television programs such as Studio One (TV series) and Omnibus (US TV series). He successfully adapted Greek tragedies for the modern stage, including a version of Oedipus Rex that received rave reviews during a New York engagement in the late ‘50s. Brady later wrote plays that were produced locally in the Washington, D.C., area, including a musical, The Coldest War of All, which received an off-Broadway mounting in 1969. For about five years, he was a major contributor of articles on regional theater to the industry standard Burns Mantle annual Best Plays volumes. Another writing venture he took on successfully was crafting documentary filmscripts for Oscar-winning producer Charles Guggenheim.

As a director, Brady tended toward classics and comedies, with a special affinity for the works of Shakespeare, Shaw, Molière, Chekhov, Ibsen, Anouilh, O’Casey, Synge and Arthur Miller. His lone New York directing credit was an off-Broadway production of the Hecht-MacArthur newspaper drama The Front Page, starring Robert Ryan and Henry Fonda. He also directed Helen Hayes’ final stage appearance in a galvanizing Washington production of O’Neill's Long Day’s Journey into Night.

It is as a teacher that Brady has probably had the most influence on the American theater scene. Three of his former playwriting students - Jason Miller (That Championship Season), Michael Cristofer (The Shadow Box), and Paula Vogel (How I Learned to Drive) — have won the Pulitzer Prize for Drama. He also taught Tony and Obie winners Mart Crowley (The Boys in the Band), Joseph Walker (The River Niger), and John Pielmeier (Agnes of God).

== Personal life ==
Married to Eleanor Buchroeder (1920–2004). The couple had eight children: Brigid, Peter, Monica, Ann, Martin, Elizabeth, Daniel and John Stephen.
