= Hope Emerson =

American actress (1897–1960)

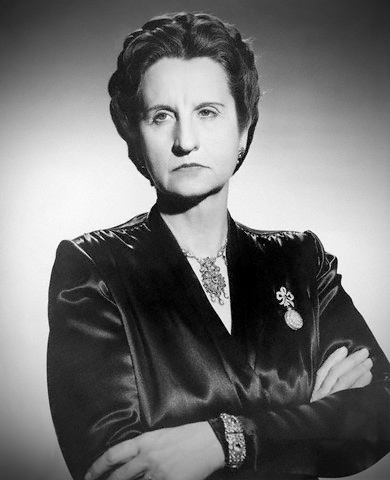
- Studio publicity photo, 1950s
- Born: October 29, 1897; Hawarden, Iowa, U.S.
- Died: April 24, 1960 (aged 62); Hollywood, California, U.S.
- Occupations: Actress, vaudeville performer, strongwoman, nightclub performer
- Years active: 1900–1960

Hope Emerson (October 29, 1897 – April 24, 1960) was an American actress, vaudevillian, nightclub performer, and strongwoman. Emerson started acting when she was three years old during a production with her mother. Her career started when she advertised sheet music by playing the piano at a 10-cent store. Emerson made her Broadway debut in Lysistrata in 1930. She starred in other plays, radio programs, films, television shows, and commercials. She often played the role of a villain in comedies and dramas. Emerson's performance in Caged "became the standard model for women's prison films." Her roles included being a circus strongwoman, a nefarious masseuse-conspirator, a mail-order bride, and a prison warden.

Emerson died from a liver ailment on April 24, 1960, at the Hollywood Presbyterian Hospital.

== Personal life ==
Hope Emerson was born in Hawarden, Iowa, on October 29, 1897, to John Alvin Emerson and Josephine "Josie" Washburn Emerson. Her father sold boots and shoes, and then became town marshal and city assessor. Emerson's mother not only attended church and was involved in social work, but she was also a vaudeville performer. Emerson had a brother and a sister, but both died soon after birth.

She began to sell music in a ten-cent store, while playing the piano, at 10 years old. Emerson played the piano for road shows at her uncle's opera house. While Emerson was a high school senior, she moved with her family to Des Moines, Iowa, where she finished her education at West High School in 1916. She never married.

When asked in a New York World-Telegram interview in 1936 about her size, Emerson said,

"I've heard a lot of blather about the tragedy of being a big woman but I've never known any of it. I suppose I've missed a lot of good cries but I've had so many laughs, I'd be a sap to kick. Life at 6 foot 3 has been so swell that I'd bat my fairy godmother over her old gray head if came around trying to make me 5 foot 3. How do I know what life would look like for me if I was so petite? It might be different. And living the kind of life that makes you glad just to be alive seems a bit more important than the size of my shoe."

== Early career ==
Emerson got started with acting at three years old as part of her mother's vaudeville performance. Emerson recalled, "I was to do a cakewalk burlesque (imitation) of the one done by the leading lady and man. I rehearsed a couple or three weeks. Everything was in readiness for my debut. But little prima donna - that's me - refused to go on. No sir. Not unless I was paid for it. The poor stage manager had to send out for a doll."

After graduation, Emerson played stock music in Omaha, Nebraska, Sioux City, Iowa, and Denver Colorado. She also performed in nightclubs and stage productions. Due to those performances, she became known as an actress, singer, and comedian. According to Emerson's cousin Sumshee Kirken, Emerson's mother sometimes worked alongside her daughter. At the time, her mother ended her career in vaudeville for sewing, dressmaking, and paying for Emerson's piano lessons. In Des Moines, Emerson performed on a piano at a 10-cent store to promote sheet music. Emerson's cousin recalled that Emerson would travel to Sioux City, Iowa, to attend shows. Some of those Sioux City shows were musical comedies that starred Fred Stone, with whom Emerson would later perform. She spent her early career playing the piano in bars and clubs, singing blues music, and performing in stage plays.

== Professional career ==
Turner Classic Movies said:

The 6'2" tall, 230-pound Hope Emerson, with her dark, curly hair, trademarked sidelong stares and grimly set mouth, may be primarily remembered for her unique and unforgettable physical presence. Most often cast in villainous roles in both comedy and drama, this giant and imposing figure could strike fear into any woman or man. Such memories, however, unjustly obscure the highly talented and surprisingly versatile actress inside.

The Hawarden Gazette wrote, "Miss Emerson was playing in vaudeville in Baltimore when her manager suddenly wired her to come to New York. Miss Emerson, it seems, was devoid of ambition to play a leading role a classical Greek drama and at first turned down the role of Lampito, but when Norman Bel Geddes, one of the producers, saw Miss Emerson, he insisted that she accept. She finally took the role and made an immediate hit in it." Despite her successful performance in Lysistrata, Emerson was initially not interested in performing on the big stage. Nonetheless, she was in the cast of the short-lived 1932 Broadway musical Smiling Faces, where she acted as the secretary to Dorothy Stone's character. The Hawarden Gazette said, "Hope Emerson works heroically as Stone's secretary in both comedy and song." Emerson was also known as the voice of "Elsie the Cow" in radio commercials for Borden Milk. In 1941, Emerson went on a 10-week-long concert tour to test her new songs that she intended to sing in New York.

She appeared in a couple of shorts, but her feature film debut was an uncredited role in Rascals (1938). Some of Emerson's more memorable roles were as a circus strongwoman in the film Adam's Rib (1949), as a nefarious masseuse-conspirator in the noirish Cry of the City (1948), and as a mail-order bride in Westward the Women (1952). Her most famous character was the sadistic prison matron Evelyn Harper in Caged (1950), a role that garnered her an Academy Award nomination for Best Supporting Actress. The book Female Masculinity says that Emerson's performance in Caged "became the standard model for women's prison films." Her other film roles included Thieves' Highway, Rosanna McCoy, House of Strangers, and Dancing in the Dark.

Emerson did not like doing a scene in Cry of the City in which she had to choke actor Richard Conte. In the 1951 film Double Crossbones, Emerson played the pirate Anne Bonny. During filming, she accidentally pinned actor Donald O'Connor to the ship's rail with her body. The accident resulted in O'Connor having a cracked rib.

Emerson was a panelist on the ABC game show Quizzing the News (1948–1949) and played hillbilly host Maw Shufflebottom on the CBS variety show Kobb's Corner (1948).

She was featured on an episode of This Is Your Life, a television show that presented one individual's achievements and life per show, with family, friends and co-workers providing anecdotes. After the host Ralph Edwards appeared, the rest of the episode focused on Emerson's life as told by people who knew her. It all happened in front of a live studio audience, and it was "considered quite an honor to be chosen."

Emerson had a regular role as Mother on the detective series Peter Gunn (1958–1961), for which she received an Emmy nomination. She left Peter Gunn after its first season for a starring role on the CBS sitcom The Dennis O'Keefe Show (1959–60).

She was also in the cast of 1940s radio shows The Adventures of Topper and Happy Island.

== Death ==
Emerson suffered from a lengthy liver ailment. She was well enough to drive from Phoenix to Hollywood by herself on April 17, 1960, but entered Hollywood Presbyterian Hospital on April 22 and died two days later. KWIT writer James C. Schaap said, "And that's why, should you stop by Hawarden sometime, you should drive up to the cemetery, take the first little road north, cross a gravel lane, keep watching the graves on the edge and you'll find the pink Emerson stone—father, mother, and daughter. Pull over. Pay your respects. There they are, together, like always. They’d enjoy your applause."

== Filmography ==
- Rascals (1938) (uncredited)
- Cry of the City (1948)
- That Wonderful Urge (1948) (uncredited)
- House of Strangers (1949)
- Thieves' Highway (1949)
- Roseanna McCoy (1949)
- Adam's Rib (1949)
- Dancing in the Dark (1949)
- Caged (1950)
- Belle Le Grand (1951)
- Double Crossbones (1951)
- Westward the Women (1951)
- The Lady Wants Mink (1953)
- A Perilous Journey (1953)
- Champ for a Day (1953)
- Casanova's Big Night (1954)
- Untamed (1955)
- The Guns of Fort Petticoat (1957)
- All Mine to Give (1957)
- Rock-A-Bye Baby (1958)
