= Edge of Doom =

1950 American film by Mark Robson

- Theatrical release poster
- Directed by: Mark Robson
- Screenplay by: Philip Yordan
- Based on: Edge of Doom; 1949 novel by Leo Brady
- Produced by: Samuel Goldwyn
- Starring: Dana Andrews; Farley Granger; Joan Evans
- Narrated by: Dana Andrews
- Cinematography: Harry Stradling
- Edited by: Daniel Mandell
- Music by: Hugo Friedhofer
- Production company: Samuel Goldwyn Productions
- Distributed by: RKO Radio Pictures
- Release dates: August 2, 1950 (Premiere-New York City); August 30, 1950 (US)
- Running time: 99 minutes
- Country: United States
- Language: English

Edge of Doom is a 1950 RKO Pictures film noir directed by Mark Robson and starring Dana Andrews, Farley Granger and Joan Evans. Edge of Doom is a rare example of a film that was significantly changed soon after it had already premiered.

== Plot ==
Father Roth counsels another priest named George, who wants to leave the parish because he is discouraged by the difficulties of caring for the parishioners. Roth tells him the story of Martin Lynn, a murderer who brought him "nearer to God".

Martin struggles for money to marry his girlfriend and to take his sick mother to Arizona to recuperate. His mother is deeply religious but Martin resents the Catholic church, specifically Father Kirkman for refusing to afford his father a proper burial after he killed himself. After his mother finally dies, Martin tells Craig, a smooth-talking older man with gambling issues, that he wants a grand funeral for his mother but cannot afford it. Craig tells him, "Somewhere out there someone owes you something. All you gotta do is have the nerve to collect."

In Father Kirkman's office, Martin demands a great church funeral, but Kirkman replies that it is a poor parish. Kirkman writes Martin's name and address on a notepad. When Kirkman raises his voice because Martin refuses to leave, Martin snaps and strikes him with the base of a crucifix. Martin wipes his fingerprints from the crucifix, removes the top sheet of the notepad and flees.

On his way home, Martin passes a cinema that Craig has just robbed. Martin is caught in the gawking crowd, but he emerges, attracting the attention of two policemen, who arrest him. Father Roth, at the station for another man, vouches for Martin and escorts him home. Later, the police hold Craig for the murder of Kirkman because Craig once threatened Kirkman, who had warned Craig's wife about his criminal past.

At the funeral home, Martin meets Father Roth, who takes him to the church to counsel him. Martin overhears an elderly lady who claims that she can identify a man whom she had seen just before the murder, and he leaves in a panic. Taking a phone call at Father Kirkman's desk, Father Roth absentmindedly rubs a pencil on Kirkman's notepad, revealing the outlines of Martin's name and address. Roth realizes that Martin is probably responsible for the murder. The police force Martin into an improvised lineup that includes both Martin and Craig, and the elderly lady mistakenly identifies Craig as the man whom she had seen.

Bothered by his conscience, Martin prays aloud to his mother at the funeral home, confessing to the crime. As he finishes praying, he finds Roth at the back of the room and asks him for help, then sees a policeman and asks for reassurance from Roth that they will permit him to attend the funeral.

Father Roth later recounts how Martin writes him letters from his cell and hopes to pray at the church again sometime in the future.

== Cast ==
- Dana Andrews as Father Thomas Roth
- Farley Granger as Martin Lynn
- Joan Evans as Rita Conroy
- Robert Keith as Lieutenant Mandel
- Paul Stewart as Craig
- Mala Powers as Julie, Martin's girlfriend
- Adele Jergens as Irene, Craig's girlfriend
- John Ridgely as 1st Detective
- Douglas Fowley as 2nd Detective
- Harold Vermilyea as Father Kirkman
- Mabel Paige as Mrs. Pearson
- Ellen Corby as Mrs. Jeanette Moore
- Robert Karnes as Father George

== Production ==
Producer Samuel Goldwyn's wife Frances read an outline of Edge of Doom and persuaded her husband to purchase film rights to the book for $125,000 just before a higher bid was submitted by Darryl F. Zanuck of Twentieth-Century Fox.

The church exterior was a set constructed in a parking lot of a side street in the Wholesale District neighborhood of downtown Los Angeles, a crowded area that had rarely been utilized for filming since the production of Harold Lloyd comedies such as Safety Last!. The studio tried to keep the exact location secret, but large crowds of onlookers formed and caused problems for the production crew, so days of location filming were alternated with days of studio filming.

== Reception ==
The reaction of preview audiences was polarized; most either loved or hated the film, although general sentiment was mostly negative. The film was subjected to three different revisions over the course of six months, including one made after the film had been released in New York. Goldwyn said: "There is too much of a tendency just to shove pictures out in Hollywood when they're completed. I put 'Edge of Doom' back before the cameras first because I thought it needed a young girl. We engaged Mala Powers for that part. I later enlarged one of the earlier sequences between the murderer and his mother. But that did not satisfy. Finally, after the New York opening, and after l had gone to Europe, I decided the picture needed a frame in the form of narration, so I had that specially written and engaged Dana Andrews to do the narration." As a result of Goldwyn's changes, the Los Angeles-area release of the film occurred nearly three months after its New York world premiere.

Critic Philip K. Scheuer of the Los Angeles Times wrote:

When I first saw Samuel Goldwyn's 'Edge of Doom," at an early preview, it struck me as the kind of hopeless, unremitting tragedy one might have expected of a European film, rather than a Hollywood film. In a heroic effort to lift the pall, Goldwyn subsequently added a couple of new characters, a prologue, an epilogue and a narrator. These additions provide a frame for the picture, a let-me-tell-you-a-story effect, which makes the events shown seem to be once removed from the audience rather than direct in impact. "Edge of Doom" gains by this compromise, for those events, although filmed in realistic, documentary style, are surely as untypical an American experience—at least in 1950—as can be imagined. Presented now as a "legend," the experience, while disturbing, may prove more readily acceptable as a whole to filmgoers. They may even draw a moral from it, for all that it comes to them in roundabout fashion.

Critic Thomas M. Pryor of The New York Times called Edge of Doom "a somber study of a tortured victim of frustration, spun out with rising and falling dramatic impact" and wrote: "Mark Robson's direction gives flashes of high tension to the film, for he has made effective use of street scenes and noises and has skillfully reflected the oppressive atmosphere of poverty and squalor, but his actors run more to types than to real people. ... The shock effect of 'Edge of Doom' comes with startling force as the enraged youth crashes a heavy brass crucifix on the back of the priest's head. But the horror of the deed tends to become diluted in the rush of consequences, partly because there is a deliberateness about the action which gives 'Edge of Doom' the appearance of having been contrived."

== Awards ==
- National Board of Review of Motion Pictures: NBR Award - Top Ten Films; 1950.
