= It Grows on Trees =

1952 film by Arthur Lubin

- Theatrical release three-sheet poster
- Directed by: Arthur Lubin
- Written by: Leonard Praskins; Barney Slater
- Based on: Short story "It Grows on Trees" by Leonard Praskins and Barney Slater
- Produced by: Leonard Goldstein
- Starring: Irene Dunne; Dean Jagger; Joan Evans
- Cinematography: Maury Gertsman
- Edited by: Milton Carruth
- Music by: Frank Skinner
- Production company: Universal Pictures
- Distributed by: Universal Pictures
- Release dates: November 3, 1952; November 28, 1952 (New York)
- Running time: 84 minutes
- Country: United States
- Language: English

It Grows on Trees is a 1952 American fantasy comedy film directed by Arthur Lubin and starring Irene Dunne, Dean Jagger, Joan Evans and Richard Crenna. The film marks Dunne's final screen appearance. It was produced and distributed by Universal Pictures.

== Plot ==
Several days after Polly Baxter plants trees in her backyard, a $5 bill floats into the house through an open window. As she continues to collect more money in the following days, Polly discovers that it is growing on the new trees but withholds the information from her husband Philip. Polly finds ways to use the money and alleviate some of the family's financial worries, but Philip wants to surrender it to the police. The Baxters' neighbors, the media, the bank and the IRS become involved.

== Cast ==
- Irene Dunne as Polly Baxter
- Dean Jagger as Phil Baxter
- Joan Evans as Diane Baxter
- Richard Crenna as Ralph Bowen
- Edith Meiser as Mrs. Pryor
- Les Tremayne as Finlay Murchison
- Forrest Lewis as Dr. Burrows
- Frank Ferguson as John Letherby
- Bob Sweeney as McGuire
- Malcolm Lee Beggs as Henry Carrollman
- Dee Pollock as Flip Baxter
- Sandy Descher as Midge Baxter

== Production ==
The screenplay is based on a story of the same title by Leonard Praskin and Barney Slater. They brought the story to Arthur Lubin, who then presented it to producer Leonard Goldstein at Universal Pictures. The studio agreed to finance the project, and in September 1951, Irene Dunne agreed to star. The film's title was There's Nothing Like Money. By November, the title had changed to It Grows on Trees and the production was slated to begin after Lubin finished Francis Goes to West Point.

Dunne requested Dean Jagger as her costar after his performance in My Son John. Joan Evans was borrowed from Samuel Goldwyn, who had borrowed Peggy Dow from Universal for I Want You the previous year.

The filmmakers negotiated with the U.S. Department of the Treasury, which maintained strict rules on the creation of fake money. The department agreed to allow fake bills for the film, but with several conditions. The producers were instructed to avoid showing the money in closeup shots and to reassemble any bills that were shown to have been cut into pieces.

== Reception ==
In a contemporary review for The New York Times, critic Howard Thompson wrote: "The scenarists, Leonard Praskins and Barney Slater, have taken a 'gimmick' that would have staggered H. G. Wells and embroidered a crescendo of cozy domestic confusion ... For our money, though, the joke stretches like a rope of taffy, until the final fadeout—a droll surprise, indeed, after so much contrived folksiness. ... Miss Dunne's arch refinement throughout underlines the basic coyness of a joke that makes its point and dingdongs itself to death."

== Radio adaptation ==
It Grows on Trees was presented on Radio Theater on November 16, 1953. The one-hour adaptation starred Ginger Rogers and Marcia Henderson.
