= Roseanna McCoy =

1949 film by Irving Reis

- Theatrical poster
- Directed by: Irving Reis; Nicholas Ray (uncredited)
- Written by: John Collier
- Based on: Roseanna McCoy by Alberta Hannum
- Produced by: Samuel Goldwyn
- Starring: Farley Granger; Joan Evans; Charles Bickford; Raymond Massey
- Cinematography: Lee Garmes
- Edited by: Daniel Mandell
- Music by: David Buttolph
- Production company: Samuel Goldwyn Productions
- Distributed by: RKO Radio Pictures
- Release dates: August 18, 1949 (Premiere-Wheeling, WV); August 20, 1949 (US)
- Running time: 100 minutes
- Country: United States
- Language: English
- Box office: $1,550,000

Roseanna McCoy is a 1949 American drama film directed by Irving Reis. The screenplay by John Collier, based on the 1947 novel of the same title by Alberta Hannum, is a romanticized and semi-fictionalized account of the Hatfield–McCoy feud. The film stars Farley Granger and Joan Evans.

== Plot ==
Set in the late 19th century, the story focuses on the forbidden romance between the title character and Johnse Hatfield, whose families have been feuding for many years. The two meet when she is stung by a hornet while picking flowers for a picnic table at the local fair and he comes to her aid. When she discovers his identity, she angrily accuses his clan of having shot and injured her mother in the distant past. Johnse protests that Mounts, who was responsible for the accident, was innocent by reason of insanity, but Roseanna wants no part of him.

Later that evening, Johnse takes Roseanna aside and kisses her, unaware they are being observed by her brother Little Randall. She is enchanted by his advances and, when shopkeeper Thad Wilkins proposes marriage to her several days later, she rejects him. Johnse takes her from her home in Kentucky across the Big Sandy River to his home in West Virginia, where he introduces her to his parents, Devil Anse and Levisa, as his future bride.

Anse uses the engagement as a reason to renew hostilities with the McCoys, and he and his sons Ellison and Cap prepare for battle. While Johnse seeks a preacher to perform the wedding ceremony, Roseanna and Levisa begin to bond. Cap is injured in an accident, and while his parents tend to his wounds, the psychotic Mounts arrives at the Hatfield cabin and threatens Roseanna, who is rescued by Anse.

While fetching water, Roseanna is approached by Little Randall, and she agrees to return home. She bids Johnse farewell and asks him to call on her father Old Randall the following evening. While en route to the McCoys, Johnse stops at Thad's store and meets Tolbert, Phamer, and Little Randall McCoy. Mounts enters and starts a brawl, and the melee escalates into a gunfight.

Thad carries the wounded Tolbert to the McCoy house, where Roseanna and her father are awaiting Johnse's arrival, and reports Little Randall is injured and trapped in the store with the Hatfields. After ordering his relatives to hold their fire, Johnse admits Roseanna, Old Randall, and Thad to the store. Mounts uses Roseanna, Johnse, and Little Randall as shields to escape, and Old Randall declares war against the Hatfields.

During the fighting, Johnse and Roseanna secretly meet, and Johnse shoots and injures Mounts before he can shoot them. As they flee on horseback, Mounts takes aim at them and is killed by Anse. The two clans lay down their weapons and watch Johnse and Roseanna ride off in search of a preacher and future happiness.

== Cast ==
- Farley Granger as Johnse Hatfield
- Joan Evans as Roseanna McCoy
- Charles Bickford as Devil Anse Hatfield
- Raymond Massey as Old Randolph McCoy
- Richard Basehart as Mounts Hatfield
- Marshall Thompson as Tolbert McCoy
- Lloyd Gough as Phamer McCoy
- Peter Miles as Little Randall McCoy
- Arthur Franz as Thad Wilkins
- Hope Emerson as Levisa Hatfield
- Gigi Perreau as Allifair McCoy
- Aline MacMahon as Sarie McCoy
- Frank Ferguson as Ellison Hatfield
- Elisabeth Fraser as Bess McCoy
- Billy Mauch as Cap Hatfield

== Production ==
Samuel Goldwyn originally had commissioned screenwriter John Collier to develop the project for Farley Granger and Cathy O'Donnell, but when O'Donnell married William Wyler's older brother, the producer - still resenting the fact Wyler had left Samuel Goldwyn Productions to form his own production company - felt betrayed and replaced her with newcomer Joan Evans. Unbeknownst to him, the girl's parents had added two years to her age and she was only fourteen when filming began.

Granger was pleased with the initial draft of the script, which had enhanced the story with undercurrents of witchcraft and superstition, and he was anxious for filming to begin. When he arrived at the studio on the first day of filming and discovered director Irving Reis was helming the project, his interest immediately waned. Reis had directed the actor in the unsuccessful Enchantment, and Granger felt he was "highly neurotic and lackluster." No one in the cast had received a shooting script, and it was not until they were on a train en route to a small town in the Sierra Madre Mountains that would serve as the set that Reis admitted the screenplay still was being written. For two weeks Reis filmed mostly establishing shots while awaiting the arrival of the script. The cast and crew finally returned to Hollywood and went on hiatus for a week.

Highly regarded script doctor Philip Yordan had been hired to work on the screenplay, and pages of dialogue began to arrive on the set. The cast found themselves filming partial scenes or having to deal with different pages of dialogue for the same scene. Frank Loesser wrote "More I Cannot Wish You" for Granger to sing to Evans, but after the sequence was filmed Goldwyn decided he hated the song and requested the composer write a title song instead. Loesser later recycled the tune and included it in the score of Guys and Dolls.

After two months of chaotic filming, the production shut down. The cast and crew was reassembled several weeks later and discovered Reis had been replaced by Nicholas Ray without explanation. On the first night of shooting, it began to rain, and it continued to rain for the next two weeks, making exterior filming impossible. Everyone returned to Hollywood, and a week later they were called back when the weather finally cleared. Ultimately, there was little Ray could do to salvage the film, and Reis alone received screen credit as director.

== Critical reception ==
The reviewer for The New York Times observed, "There is much feudin', fussin' and lovin' in this pictorially handsome recreation of the fabulous enmity between the Hatfields and the McCoys, but the characters lack the stature of true persons. The famous mountain families have been satirized and distorted in jokes and comic strips for so many years now that it is difficult to take them seriously. This is a handicap the picture does not entirely overcome . . . Roseanna McCoy, as adapted by John Collier, does not have as much heart or narrative integrity as did the Alberta Hannum novel on which the film is based. There was a Romeo and Juliet quality to the written romance that does not come through on the screen. The director has pointed all his action toward the inevitable gun clash between the clans . . . It is a lively, noisy battle, but somehow its effect is anticlimatic [sic] and, in this spectator's opinion, heightens the feeling that Roseanna McCoy is not a valid dramatic achievement. That the producer strove to recreate an authentic picture of early American superstitions and ignorance is quite evident, but, like the Dodgers, the opposition apparently was too much for him this time."
