= Rebel in Town =

1956 film by Alfred L. Werker

- Theatrical release poster
- Directed by: Alfred L. Werker
- Screenplay by: Danny Arnold
- Story by: Danny Arnold
- Produced by: Howard W. Koch; Aubrey Schenck
- Starring: John Payne; Ruth Roman; J. Carrol Naish; Ben Cooper
- Cinematography: Gordon Avil
- Edited by: John F. Schreyer
- Music by: Les Baxter
- Color process: Black and white
- Production companies: Schenck-Koch Productions; Bel-Air Productions
- Distributed by: United Artists
- Release date: July 30, 1956
- Running time: 78 minutes
- Country: United States
- Language: English

Rebel in Town is a 1956 American Western film directed by Alfred L. Werker and starring John Payne, Ruth Roman, J. Carrol Naish and Ben Cooper.

== Plot ==
Home from the Civil War, where he fought for the Union army, John Willoughby now lives in the western town of Kittreck Wells with wife Nora and their 7-year-old son, Petey. An appeal for help from Marshal Russell comes when a band of former Confederate soldiers are seen pulling a robbery in a neighboring town. John, who hates all rebels, agrees to go, against his wife's wishes that all his fighting must end.

Meanwhile, the Rebels, Bedloe Mason and his sons Gray, Wesley, Cain and Frank, decide to ride into Kittreck Wells to replenish their dwindling water supply. Bedloe sends Gray, Frank and Wesley into town while he and Cain await their return. Petey Willoughby, who shares his father's dislike of rebels, aims and fires a cap pistol at them. Startled by the sound, Wesley Mason shoots and kills the boy. As the brothers mount their horses and gallop out of town, Gray, horrified by what has happened, hesitates, then catches up to the others.

When they reach Bedloe and Cain, Gray, angered by his brother's recklessness, appeals to his father and brothers that Wesley has to go back to face the consequences. Wesley is dead-set against this and the others take his side. Gray rides off alone to learn the fate of the boy, but Wesley ambushes his brother by throwing a knife into his back. After strapping his brother's unconscious body onto his horse, Wesley sets the animal loose. He then returns to camp and reports that Gray refused to listen to reason, but told him he will meet the family at Oak Fork in three days. That night, John finds the wandering horse bearing Gray and takes him home.

Gray gradually recovers. Nora knows he was one of the gang, and that he did not kill Petey, but she doesn't let John know, fearful that he will kill Gray if he knows. John is still determined to learn who killed Petey, and an eyewitness accuses Gray of being one of the gang. Nora has to stop her husband from attacking Gray with an axe. She warns him that she will leave him unless he forswears his murderous hatred of Confederates.

The marshal places Gray under arrest until a trial can be convened. A lynch mob threatens to drag him out of the jail. Bedloe, meanwhile, realizes Wesley has been lying. He ties Wesley to a tree and whips him until Wesley confesses what really happened. Just as the vigilantes are about to hang Gray, the Masons ride into town. When it is evident to all that Wesley is the guilty one, he runs from the mob. Gray follows and then fights with Wesley, who knocks Gray out and then pulls a knife. John, finally aware who really killed the boy, arrives in time to stop Wesley from stabbing the unconscious Gray. John and Wesley fight and Wesley is stabbed and dies. Mason and his boys leave peacefully. John embraces Nora.

== Cast ==
- John Payne as John Willoughby
- Ruth Roman as Nora Willoughby
- J. Carrol Naish as Bedloe Mason
- Ben Cooper as Gray Mason
- John Smith as Wesley Mason
- Ben Johnson as Frank Mason
- Sterling Franck as Cain Mason
- Bobby Clark as Peter Willoughby
- Mimi Gibson as Lisbeth Ackstadt
- Mary Adams as Grandma Ackstadt
- James Griffith as Sheriff Adam Russell
- Joel Ashley as Doctor

== Reception ==
Paul Mavis of DVD Talk rated it 3.5/5 stars and called it "a surprisingly nimble, efficient B-western with a lot going on under the surface".

TV Guide rated it 3/4 stars and called it "a finely scripted, produced, and acted film".

== See also ==
- List of American films of 1956
