= Daniel Mandell =

American film editor

- Born: August 13, 1895; New York City, New York, U.S.
- Died: June 8, 1987 (aged 91); Huntington Beach, California, U.S.
- Occupation: Film editor
- Years active: 1922–1966

Daniel Mandell (August 13, 1895 – June 8, 1987) was an American film editor with more than 70 film credits. His first editing credit was for The Turmoil in 1924. From Dodsworth (1936) to Porgy and Bess (1959), Mandell worked for Samuel Goldwyn Productions. He had notable collaborations with directors William Wyler (1933–1946) and Billy Wilder (1957–1966). Mandell's last credit was for The Fortune Cookie in 1966.

Mandell won the Academy Award for Best Film Editing for The Pride of the Yankees (1942; directed by Sam Wood), The Best Years of Our Lives (1946; directed by William Wyler), and The Apartment (1960; directed by Billy Wilder). No editor has won more than three Academy Awards, and only three others have won three times: Ralph Dawson, Michael Kahn, and Thelma Schoonmaker. Mandell was nominated for the Academy Award for two additional films, The Little Foxes (1941; directed by William Wyler) and Witness for the Prosecution (1957; directed by Billy Wilder).

Additional credits include Holiday (1930), Counsellor at Law (1933), Dodsworth (1936), Wuthering Heights (1939), Meet John Doe (1941), The North Star (1943), Enchantment (1948), Roseanna McCoy (1949), Guys and Dolls (1955), and Kiss Me, Stupid (1964).

== Filmography ==
Editor
Year	Film	Director	Notes	Other notes
1924	The Turmoil	Hobart Henley		
1925	California Straight Ahead	Harry A. Pollard	First collaboration with Harry A. Pollard	
1926	Poker Faces	Harry A. Pollard	Second collaboration with Harry A. Pollard	
1927	Love Me and the World Is Mine	E. A. Dupont		
1927	Beware of Widows	Wesley Ruggles		
1927	Uncle Tom's Cabin	Harry A. Pollard	Third collaboration with Harry A. Pollard	
1929	Man, Woman and Wife	Edward Laemmle	First collaboration with Edward Laemmle	
1929	Silks and Saddles	Robert F. Hill	First collaboration with Robert F. Hill	
1929	Show Boat	Harry A. Pollard	Fourth collaboration with Harry A. Pollard	
1929	Melody Lane	Robert F. Hill	Second collaboration with Robert F. Hill	Uncredited
1930	Undertow	Harry A. Pollard	Fifth collaboration with Harry A. Pollard	
1930	Swing High	Joseph Santley		
1930	Holiday	Edward H. Griffith	First collaboration with Edward H. Griffith	
1930	Sin Takes a Holiday	Paul L. Stein	First collaboration with Paul L. Stein	
1931	Beyond Victory	John S. Robertson		
1931	Rebound	Edward H. Griffith	Second collaboration with Edward H. Griffith	
1931	Devotion	Robert Milton		
1932	A Woman Commands	Paul L. Stein	Second collaboration with Paul L. Stein	
1932	The Animal Kingdom	Edward H. Griffith	Third collaboration with Edward H. Griffith	
1933	Emergency Call	Edward L. Cahn		
1933	Saturday's Millions	Edward Sedgwick	First collaboration with Edward Sedgwick	Uncredited
1933	Counsellor at Law	William Wyler	First collaboration with William Wyler	
1934	Love Birds	William A. Seiter		
1934	I'll Tell the World	Edward Sedgwick	Second collaboration with Edward Sedgwick	
1934	Embarrassing Moments	Edward Laemmle	Second collaboration with Edward Laemmle	
1934	Wake Up and Dream	Kurt Neumann		
1934	There's Always Tomorrow	Edward Sloman		
1935	The Good Fairy	William Wyler	Second collaboration with William Wyler	
1935	Diamond Jim	A. Edward Sutherland		
1935	His Night Out	William Nigh		
1935	King Solomon of Broadway	Alan Crosland		
1936	These Three	William Wyler	Third collaboration with William Wyler	
1936	Dodsworth	William Wyler	Fourth collaboration with William Wyler	
1937	You Only Live Once	Fritz Lang		
1937	Woman Chases Man	John G. Blystone		
1937	Dead End	William Wyler	Fifth collaboration with William Wyler	
1939	Wuthering Heights	William Wyler	Sixth collaboration with William Wyler	
1939	The Real Glory	Henry Hathaway		
1940	The Westerner	William Wyler	Seventh collaboration with William Wyler	
1941	Meet John Doe	Frank Capra	First collaboration with Frank Capra	
1941	The Little Foxes	William Wyler	Eighth collaboration with William Wyler	
1941	Ball of Fire	Howard Hawks	First collaboration with Howard Hawks	
1942	The Pride of the Yankees	Sam Wood		
1943	They Got Me Covered	David Butler	First collaboration with David Butler	
1943	The North Star	Lewis Milestone		
1944	Up in Arms	Elliott Nugent		
1944	Arsenic and Old Lace	Frank Capra	Second collaboration with Frank Capra	
1944	The Princess and the Pirate	David Butler	Second collaboration with David Butler	
1945	Wonder Man	H. Bruce Humberstone		
1946	The Kid from Brooklyn	Norman Z. McLeod		
1946	The Best Years of Our Lives	William Wyler	Ninth collaboration with William Wyler	
1948	A Song Is Born	Howard Hawks	Second collaboration with Howard Hawks	
1948	Enchantment	Irving Reis	First collaboration with Irving Reis	
1949	Roseanna McCoy	Irving Reis	Second collaboration with Irving Reis	
1949	My Foolish Heart	Mark Robson	First collaboration with Mark Robson	
1950	Edge of Doom	Mark Robson	Second collaboration with Mark Robson	
1951	Valentino	Lewis Allen		
1951	A Millionaire for Christy	George Marshall		
1951	I Want You	Mark Robson	Third collaboration with Mark Robson	
1952	Hans Christian Andersen	Charles Vidor		
1953	Return to Paradise	Mark Robson	Fourth collaboration with Mark Robson	
1955	Guys and Dolls	Joseph L. Mankiewicz		
1956	The Sharkfighters	Jerry Hopper		
1957	Witness for the Prosecution	Billy Wilder	First collaboration with Billy Wilder	
1959	Porgy and Bess	Otto Preminger		
1960	The Apartment	Billy Wilder	Second collaboration with Billy Wilder	
1961	One, Two, Three	Billy Wilder	Third collaboration with Billy Wilder	
1963	Irma la Douce	Billy Wilder	Fourth collaboration with Billy Wilder	
1964	Kiss Me, Stupid	Billy Wilder	Fifth collaboration with Billy Wilder	
1966	The Fortune Cookie	Billy Wilder	Sixth collaboration with Billy Wilder	

Editorial department
Year	Film	Director	Role	Notes
1922	Foolish Wives	Erich von Stroheim	Assistant editor	Uncredited
1956	Hot Rod Girl	Leslie H. Martinson	Assistant film editor	Uncredited
1964	Kiss Me, Stupid	Billy Wilder	Assistant editor	Uncredited

Shorts

Editor
Year	Film	Director
1932	Parlor, Bedroom and Wrath	Harry Sweet
1932	A Firehouse Honeymoon	George Marshall
1932	Sham Poo, the Magician	Harry Sweet
1932	Jitters the Butler	Mark Sandrich
1933	Art in the Raw	Harry Sweet
1933	The Gay Nighties	Mark Sandrich

== See also ==
- List of film director and editor collaborations
