= The Turmoil (1924 film) =

1924 film

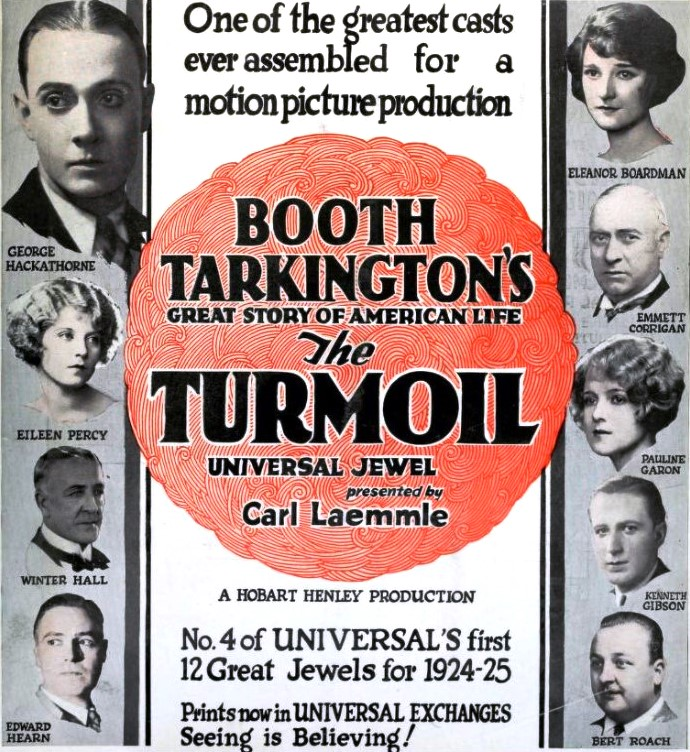
- Advertisement
- Directed by: Hobart Henley
- Written by: Edward T. Lowe, Jr.
- Based on: The Turmoil by Booth Tarkington
- Produced by: Carl Laemmle
- Cinematography: Charles Stumar
- Edited by: Daniel Mandell
- Distributed by: Universal Pictures
- Release date: September 14, 1924
- Running time: 7 reels
- Country: United States
- Language: Silent (English intertitles)

The Turmoil is a 1924 American silent melodrama film produced and distributed by Universal Pictures and directed by Hobart Henley. It is based on the novel, The Turmoil, by Booth Tarkington. A previous film of the novel, The Turmoil, by Metro Pictures, was released in 1916.

== Plot ==
As described in a film magazine, James Sheridan Sr. (Corrigan) has made himself the captain of many industries and the undisputed financial king of his city. He wants his three sons to be like him. Jim Jr. (von Eltz), is willing. Roscoe (Hearn) is too willing, if he is to be happy with his passionate, selfish, trouble-making wife, Sybil (Percy). Bibbs (Hackathorne) is entirely unwilling. He is of a poetic nature and cares little for industry. Another family, high in social position but low in finances, lives near the Sheridans. There comes a point when Mary Vertrees (Boardman), the daughter, finds it necessary to seek a marriage with Jim Sheridan Jr., to save the family name from financial disgrace. A sudden catastrophe in the gigantic warehouse building program of Jim Sheridan Jr., kills him. Sheridan now looks to his other sons. Roscoe, usually a willing worker, is worried by his wife's actions. Sybil, though he does not know it, is in love with Bobby Lamhorn (Gibson). Roscoe breaks under the strain of worry and Sheridan is forced to consider Bibbs, the unreliable, as his heir and future captain of the Sheridan interests. Bibbs has made a friend of Mary Vertrees, a point which Sybil, the troublemaker, carefully notes. Sybil succeeds in breaking up Bibbs' tender romance and making out of him a silent recluse. He drives himself at business and soon is the real captain of the Sheridan interests, and later wins Mary.

== Cast ==
- Emmett Corrigan as James Sheridan, Sr.
- George Hackathorne as Bibbs Sheridan
- Edward Hearn as Roscoe Sheridan
- Theodore von Eltz as James Sheridan, Jr.
- Eileen Percy as Sybil, Mrs. Roscoe Sheridan
- Pauline Garon as Edith Sheridan
- Eleanor Boardman as Mary Vertrees
- Winter Hall as Henry Vertrees
- Kitty Bradbury as Mrs. Henry Vertrees
- Kenneth Gibson as Bobby Lamhorn
- Victory Bateman as Mrs. James Sheridan
- Bert Roach as Bit Role (uncredited)

== Preservation ==
The Turmoil is preserved at the UCLA Film & Television Archive.
