= The Outcast (1954 film) =

1954 film

- Directed by: William Witney
- Screenplay by: John K. Butler; Richard Wormser
- Story by: Todhunter Ballard
- Produced by: William J. O'Sullivan
- Starring: John Derek; Joan Evans; Jim Davis; Catherine McLeod; Ben Cooper
- Cinematography: Reggie Lanning
- Edited by: Tony Martinelli
- Music by: R. Dale Butts
- Color process: Trucolor
- Production company: Republic Pictures
- Distributed by: Republic Pictures
- Release date: August 15, 1954
- Running time: 90 minutes
- Country: United States
- Language: English

The Outcast is a 1954 American Western film, directed by William Witney and starring John Derek and Joan Evans. It was produced and distributed by Republic Pictures and was made on a slightly higher budget than many of the second features the company released.

== Plot ==
Jet Cosgrave has been cheated out of his inheritance by his crooked uncle, Maj. Linton Cosgrave. Jet is an outcast from the community. He tries to clear his name and win back his father’s ranch by hiring some gunmen. Along the way, he falls for Judy Polsen and also flirts with his uncle’s fiancée Alice Austin. Jet faces off with his uncle "The Major" and mortally wounds him in a stand-off. The film ends with Devlin the Cosgrave family lawyer admitting he forged Jet's father's will and proving the ranch was always his.

== Cast ==
- John Derek as Jet Cosgrave
- Joan Evans as Judy Polsen
- Jim Davis as Maj. Linton Cosgrave
- Catherine McLeod as Alice Austin
- Ben Cooper as The Kid
- Taylor Holmes as Andrew Devlin
- Nana Bryant as Mrs. Banner
- Slim Pickens as Boone Polsen
- Frank Ferguson as Chad Polsen
- James Millican as Cal Prince
- Bob Steele as Dude Rankin
- Nacho Galindo as Curly
- Harry Carey, Jr. as Bert
- Robert 'Buzz' Henry as Zeke Polsen
- Nicolas Coster as Asa Polsen
- Bill Walker as Sam Allen, the blacksmith

== Reception ==
FilmInk called it John Derek's "best Western... one of the rare movies where Derek plays someone with balls, a tough, ruthless womanising killer. It’s pretty good work. The film was directed by Quentin Tarantino fave William Witney and is full of action – people are always climbing through windows and pulling guns and double crossing each other."

== Bibliography ==
- Pitts, Michael R. Western Movies: A Guide to 5,105 Feature Films. McFarland, 2012.
