= Champ for a Day =

1953 film by William A. Seiter

- Theatrical release poster
- Directed by: William A. Seiter
- Screenplay by: Irving Shulman
- Based on: The Disappearance of Dolan by William Fay
- Produced by: William A. Seiter
- Starring: Alex Nicol; Audrey Totter; Charles Winninger; Hope Emerson; Joseph Wiseman; Barry Kelley
- Cinematography: John L. Russell
- Edited by: Fred Allen
- Music by: R. Dale Butts
- Production company: Republic Pictures
- Distributed by: Republic Pictures
- Release date: August 15, 1953
- Running time: 90 minutes
- Country: United States
- Language: English

Champ for a Day is a 1953 American crime film directed by William A. Seiter and written by Irving Shulman. The film stars Alex Nicol, Audrey Totter, Charles Winninger, Hope Emerson, Joseph Wiseman and Barry Kelley. The film was released on August 15, 1953, by Republic Pictures.

== Plot ==
Big pug George Wilson shows up at a motel and diner run by Ma and Pa Karlsen, saying he's supposed to meet his manager, Dolan. He catches the eye of another customer, the attractive Miss Gormley, but she seems to be in a bad mood.

George has a fight lined up, but boxing promoters Guido and Healy believe that Dolan has run off with George's advance payment. George decides to go ahead with the fight, with down-and-out trainer Al Muntz agreeing to work in his corner.

By winning the fight, George angers ex-boxer Willie Foltis, who had bet heavily on the loser. George stays with the Karlsens and becomes better acquainted with Miss Gormley, who, it turns out, had also come there to meet Dolan, who was trying to blackmail her into marriage.

A bout with the tough "Soldier" Freeman is set up, but Guido and Healy insist that George throw the fight. Muntz warns him that Guido and Healy are connected with organized crime. Willie also comes to rob George of his prize winnings from the previous fight, but George knocks him cold.

Dolan's dead body is found in the river. George schemes to turn Guido and Healy against one another, resulting in them exchanging gunfire after the fight. Miss Gormley likes the way George has handled himself and they look like a perfect match.

== Cast ==
- Alex Nicol as George Wilson
- Audrey Totter as Miss Peggy Gormley
- Charles Winninger as Pa Karlsen
- Hope Emerson as Ma Karlsen
- Joseph Wiseman as Dominic Guido
- Barry Kelley as Tom Healy
- Harry Morgan as Al Muntz
- Jesse White as Willie Foltis
- Horace McMahon as Sam Benton
- Grant Withers as Scotty Cameron
- Eddy Waller as Phil
- Dick Wessel as 'Speedtrap' Calhoun
- Hal Baylor as 'Soldier' Freeman

== See also ==
- List of boxing films
