= Katherine Albert =

American screenwriter

- Born: October 6, 1902; Louisville, Kentucky, U.S.
- Died: July 26, 1970 (aged 67); Santa Monica, California, U.S.
- Occupations: Film and television writer
- Spouse: Dale Eunson
- Children: Joan Evans

Katherine Eunson (née Albert; 6 October 1902 – 26 July 1970) was an American screenwriter, playwright, and TV writer.

== Biography ==
Katherine Albert was born in Kentucky, the only child of George Albert and Logie Bell Evans Albert. As a young girl, she dreamed of becoming an actress, and she persuaded a family friend who was related to D. W. Griffith to get her an introduction when she moved to California at age 16. Griffith brought her onto his stock company, and she appeared in a few small roles on the stage and in silent films before deciding that acting wasn't for her. The family moved away from Los Angeles for a time.

When she moved back to Hollywood in her early 20s, she began writing for publications like The Los Angeles Daily News and Photoplay before getting a job in MGM's publicity department. Early on in that assignment, she was charged with working with Greta Garbo, with whom she reportedly did not get along well.

At MGM, she met Dale Eunson (1904–2002), who later become the fiction editor of Cosmopolitan magazine. They married in 1931 and collaborated on a number of short stories, stage plays (including Loco, which ran on Broadway in 1946–47), and screenplays. Loco was later used, together with Zoe Akins' The Greeks Had a Word for It, as a source for the 1953 film How to Marry a Millionaire, starring Betty Grable, Marilyn Monroe, and Lauren Bacall.

They had a daughter, Joan, named for her godmother, film star Joan Crawford. Joan Eunson (later Joan Evans) became an actress and entertainment journalist. Albert was encouraging of Joan's career, but preferred not to meddle: "I've had to work with a lot of movie mamas. Believe me, I want no part of that."

She and Eunson wrote most of their films and TV episodes after Albert suffered a major heart attack around 1950. During the 1950s and 1960s, they wrote half a dozen films and over a dozen TV episodes. They worked almost all the way up through Albert's death in 1970.

Dale Eunson later remarried, to Berenice Dratler. The two lived in Santa Barbara, California before moving to the Motion Picture Retirement Home in Woodland Hills, Los Angeles, in 1993. Eunson's second wife died there, predeceasing Eunson, who died there in 2002, aged 97, from natural causes.

== Selected works ==
=== Film ===
- Gidget Goes to Rome (1963)
- All Mine to Give (1957)
- Eighteen and Anxious (1957)
- Sabre Jet (1953)
- The Star (1952)
- On the Loose (1951)

=== Television ===
- Run for Your Life (1966–1968; two episodes)
- Karen (1965; one episode)
- Father of the Bride (1961; one episode)
- Leave It to Beaver (1959–1961; four episodes)
- The Rifleman (1959; one episode)
- General Electric Theater (1958–1961; three episodes)
- Buckskin (1958–1959; two episodes)
- Climax! (1957; one episode)
- TV Reader's Digest (1955; three episodes)
