= Duel at Apache Wells =

1957 film by Joseph Kane

- Theatrical release poster in the United States
- Directed by: Joseph Kane
- Written by: Robert Kreighton Williams
- Produced by: Joseph Kane
- Starring: Anna Maria Alberghetti; Ben Cooper; Jim Davis
- Cinematography: Jack Marta
- Edited by: Richard L. Van Enger
- Production company: Republic Pictures
- Distributed by: Republic Pictures
- Release date: January 25, 1957
- Running time: 70 minutes
- Country: United States
- Language: English

Duel at Apache Wells (also known as Durango Kid der Rächer in Austrian and West German territories) is a 1957 American Western film in Naturama directed by Joseph Kane (credited as Joe Kane) for Republic Pictures. It was written by Robert Kreighton Williams (as Bob Williams) and stars Anna Maria Alberghetti, Ben Cooper and Jim Davis.

== Plot ==
After years of absence, Johnny Shattuck (Ben Cooper) returns home, only to find a gang after his father's ranch and his girlfriend (Anna Maria Alberghetti).

== Cast ==
- Anna Maria Alberghetti as Anita Valdez
- Ben Cooper as Johnny Shattuck (a.k.a. "The Durango Kid")
- Jim Davis as Dean Cannary
- Harry Shannon as Wayne Shattuck
- Francis McDonald as Hank
- Bob Steele as Joe Dunn
- Argentina Brunetti as Tia Maria
