= Joan Evans (actress) =

American film actress (1934–2023)

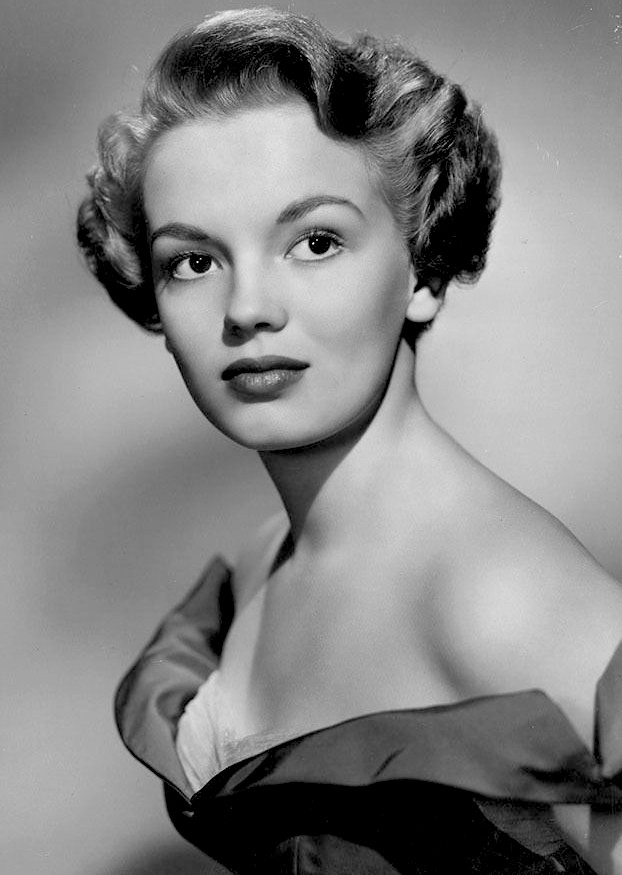
- Evans in Edge of Doom (1950)
- Born: Joan Katherine Eunson; July 18, 1934; New York City, New York, U.S.
- Died: October 21, 2023 (aged 89); Henderson, Nevada, U.S.
- Occupation: Actress
- Years active: 1949–1961
- Spouse: Gerald Kirby Weatherly (m. 1952–2023) (his death)
- Children: 2

Joan Evans (born Joan Katherine Eunson; July 18, 1934 – October 21, 2023) was an American film actress known for Roseanna McCoy, Skirts Ahoy! and co-starred with Audie Murphy in the movie, Column South. She was married to Kirby Weatherly in August 1952.

== Early years ==
Joan Katherine Eunson was born in New York City on July 18, 1934, to Hollywood writers Dale Eunson and Katherine Albert. Her father wrote the book The Day They Gave Babies Away, which was made into the movie All Mine to Give (1957). She was named after actress Joan Crawford, her godmother. She played Gretel in a school performance of Hansel and Gretel.

== Acting ==
=== Sam Goldwyn ===
Evans appeared in three movies with actor Farley Granger. Her first film with him was as the title role in Roseanna McCoy (1949), based on the real-life romance between two members of the Hatfield-McCoy feud. She gained the role after producer Samuel Goldwyn conducted a national talent search after the original star, Cathy O'Donnell, pulled out. Evans was only 14 years old when she started work on Roseanna McCoy, and her parents added two years to her age so she could claim to be 16 when the film was released.

Evans' film career was launched with her three pictures opposite Granger, including a supporting role in the drama Our Very Own (1950) and a featured part in the crime story Edge of Doom (1950).

Evans had top billing as a suicidal teenager in RKO's drama On the Loose (1951), then second billing to Esther Williams in an MGM musical comedy, Skirts Ahoy! (1952).

Goldwyn lent her to Universal, where she was third-billed as Irene Dunne's daughter in It Grows on Trees (1952). She was Audie Murphy's leading lady in Column South (1953).

=== Television ===
At Republic, she starred as the love interest of John Derek in a Western, The Outcast (1954), and started appearing on TV shows, including General Electric Theatre, Climax!, The Millionaire, Schlitz Playhouse, Cavalcade of America, Lux Video Theatre, Cheyenne, Wagon Train, 77 Sunset Strip, and Zorro.

Evans had the lead in a crime film for Republic, A Strange Adventure (1956) and was reunited with Murphy for No Name on the Bullet (1959). For Sam Katzman, she was one of The Flying Fontaines (1959).

Her final performances were in The Chevy Mystery Show, The Rebel, Outlaws, Tales of Wells Fargo, The Brothers Brannagan, Ripcord, and The Tall Man. Her last feature film was The Walking Target. Her last role was in the episode "The Killer Legend" of Laramie as Julie Wade.

Evans retired from acting in 1961 at just 27 years old.

== Journalism ==
In the 1950s, Evans wrote articles for Photoplay magazine. Beginning in May 1966, she was editor of Hollywood Studio Magazine, using her married name, Joan Evans Weatherly.

== Later years ==
Evans became an educator, and in the 1970s, she was the director of Carden Academy in Van Nuys, California.

== Personal life ==
On July 24, 1952, 6 days after Evans turned 18, she married car dealer Gerald Kirby Weatherly in Joan Crawford's home. Her parents asked Crawford, their daughter's godmother, to dissuade her from marrying, since she was so young. Katherine Albert and her husband Dale Eunson reportedly based the unflattering Margaret Elliot character in their film, The Star on Joan Crawford, whose long friendship with the couple was ending as production began. Crawford retaliated after the Eunsons sent their daughter to her in hopes that Crawford would talk her out of marrying so young. Instead, Crawford arranged the wedding, held it in her house, and called the Eunsons afterward to tell them about it. "She set the whole thing up behind our backs", Albert complained. "She called the judge and the press. She didn't invite us to our own daughter's wedding." Evans's marriage to Weatherly lasted 70 years, but the friendship between Evans' parents and Crawford ended permanently.

The Weatherlys had a daughter on August 16, 1955, and a son in January 1960. In 1984, Joan Evans and her husband signed a tribute to Joan Crawford in Daily Variety.

== Death ==
On October 21, 2023, Evans died in Henderson, Nevada. She was 89, and was survived by her two children and a grandson. Her husband had predeceased her, dying on January 1, 2023, aged 97.

== Filmography ==
=== Film ===
- Roseanna McCoy (1949) – Roseanna McCoy
- Our Very Own (1950) – Joan Macaulay
- Edge of Doom (1950) – Rita Conroy
- On the Loose (1951) – Jill Bradley
- Skirts Ahoy! (1952) – Mary Kate Yarbrough
- It Grows on Trees (1952) – Diane Baxter
- Column South (1953) – Marcy Whitlock
- The Outcast (1954) – Judy Polsen
- A Strange Adventure (1956) – Terry Dolgin
- No Name on the Bullet (1959) – Anne Benson
- The Flying Fontaines (1959) – Jan Fontaine
- The Walking Target (1960) – Gail Russo

=== Television ===
- General Electric Theater (1954)
- Climax! (1954–1955) – Helen O'Neill, Narrator
- The Millionaire (1956) – Julie
- Schlitz Playhouse of Stars (1956)
- Cavalcade of America (1957)
- Lux Video Theatre (1956–1957)
- Cheyenne (1958) – Lilac (Episode – "The Angry Sky")
- 77 Sunset Strip (1958) – Diane Forsythe
- Wagon Train (1959) – 'The Duke Le May Story - Sarah Sinclair
- Zorro (1959) – Leonar
- The Chevy Mystery Show (1960) – Blanche
- The Rebel (1960) – Cassie
- Outlaws (1961) – Molly Moore
- Tales of Wells Fargo (1961) – Kathy Davidson
- The Brothers Brannagan (1960–1961) – Terry, Peggy Dodd
- Ripcord (1961) – Juli Warner
- The Tall Man (1961) – Lou Belle Martin
- Laramie 1961 – Julie Wade
