= Ben Cooper =

American actor (1933–2020)

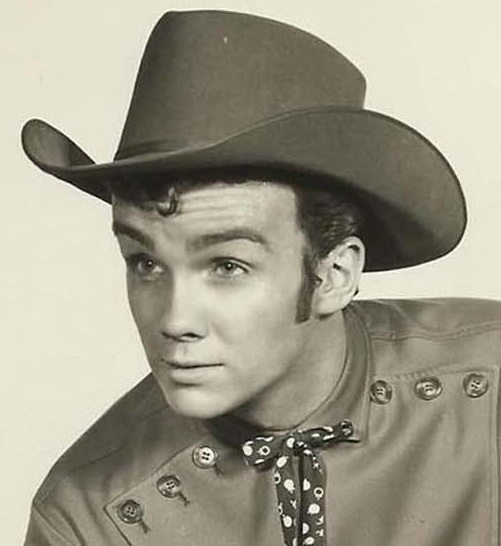
- Cooper in 1954
- Born: September 30, 1933; Hartford, Connecticut, U.S.
- Died: February 24, 2020 (aged 86); Memphis, Tennessee, U.S.
- Education: Columbia University
- Occupation: Actor
- Years active: 1939–1995
- Known for: Johnny Guitar; Rebel in Town; The Rose Tattoo; The Last Command
- Spouse: Pamela R. Cooper (m. 1960; died 2008)
- Children: 2
- Awards: Golden Boot Award

Ben Cooper (September 30, 1933 – February 24, 2020) was an American film and television actor who won a Golden Boot Award in 2005 for his work in Westerns.

== Stage ==
Cooper appeared on Broadway in Life with Father (1939). He debuted in the role of Harlan at age 9; before the play performances ended in 1943, Cooper had grown enough to play Whitney.

== Radio ==
Cooper acted in thirty-four radio serials, many of them soap operas, in the era of old-time radio.

== Film and television career ==
Cooper's earliest credited screen appearance was as an eighteen-year-old in 1952–1953 on the Armstrong Circle Theatre, then on NBC, in the two episodes "The Commandant's Clock" and "Changing Dream". Thereafter, he appeared in numerous films with Republic Pictures such as Thunderbirds, Johnny Guitar, The Last Command, Duel at Apache Wells (1956), and other films such as The Rose Tattoo.

Cooper began appearing on dozens of television Westerns. He was cast as Clint Harding, a young man intent on murdering his father, in the 1956 episode, "Vengeance Canyon" on Dick Powell's Zane Grey Theatre. Walter Brennan and Sheb Wooley played outlaws, Joe and Brock, respectively, whom Clint encountered on the trail. Joe tries to convince Clint that vengeance is unproductive.

He appeared in Tales of Wells Fargo, Wagon Train, Gunsmoke (in 1962 as “Pitt”, a semi-outlaw trying to go straight and become a Doctor with “Doc Adam’s” help in S7E11’s “Apprentice Doc” and in 1965 as “Breck”, a more progressive thinking townsman in S10E36’s “Two Tall Men”), Bonanza, an episode of The Rifleman and Rawhide. He unsuccessfully tested in 1962 for the role of Steve Hill on NBC's 90-minute Western television series, The Virginian. He appeared in 1963 as Corporal Cross—second in command to Sergeant Saunders, played by series co-star Vic Morrow—in Season 1/episode 18 of the series Combat. He played murderer Frank Wells in the 1961 Perry Mason episode "The Case of the Impatient Partner," Davis Crane in the (1962) episode "The Case of the Promoter's Pillbox" and James Grover in "The Case of the Polka Dot Pony". He also played murderer Clyde Jasper in the (1965) episode "The Case of the Mischievous Doll" and Lowell Rupert in "The Case of the Baffling Bug".

== Personal life ==
Cooper was a native of Hartford, Connecticut, then resided in the Greater Los Angeles area. He served in the US Army.

After he was diagnosed with dementia, he moved to a memory care facility in Memphis, Tennessee, in 2017 to be near his family; he died there on February 24, 2020, at the age of 86. He had two daughters by his late wife Pamela R. Cooper.

Cooper supported Barry Goldwater in the 1964 United States presidential election.

== Quotes ==
They let me play cowboy, and they paid me [for it]. I’d ridden horses, I got my own horse when I was 12. I used to jump him bareback. I didn’t know they had stuntmen; I’d watch a movie and then practise on my horse until I could do [the stunt.]

== Filmography ==
=== Film appearances ===
- Side Street (1950) - Young Man at Cleaners (uncredited)
- Thunderbirds (1952) - Calvin Jones
- Woman They Almost Lynched (1953) - Jesse James
- A Perilous Journey (1953) - Sam
- Sea of Lost Ships (1953) - 3rd Plane Crewman
- Flight Nurse (1953) - Pfc. Marvin Judd
- Johnny Guitar (1954) - Turkey Ralston
- The Outcast (1954) - The Kid
- Hell's Outpost (1954) - Alec Bacchione
- The Eternal Sea (1955) - Seaman P.J. 'Zuggy' Zugbaum
- The Last Command (1955) - Jeb Lacey
- Headline Hunters (1955) - David Flynn
- The Rose Tattoo (1955) - Seaman Jack Hunter
- The Fighting Chance (1955) - Mike Gargan
- A Strange Adventure (1956) - Harold Norton
- Rebel in Town (1956) - Gray Mason
- Duel at Apache Wells (1957) - Johnny Shattuck
- Outlaw's Son (1957) - Jeff Blaine
- Chartroose Caboose (1960) - Dub Dawson
- Gunfight at Comanche Creek (1963) - Carter
- The Raiders (1963) - Tom King
- Arizona Raiders (1965) - Willie Martin
- Waco (1966) - Scotty Moore
- Red Tomahawk (1967) - Lt. Drake
- The Fastest Guitar Alive (1967) - Rink
- Support Your Local Gunfighter (1971) - Colorado
- One More Train to Rob (1971) - First Deputy
- The Sky's the Limit (1975) - Hank
- Lightning Jack (1994) - Shopkeeper in Bank

=== Television appearances ===
Cooper was a notable performer in many television Westerns. Cooper also appeared in television pilots for Command (1958), The Reno Brothers (1960), and The Freebooters (1967). These performances include appearances in the following television Westerns:

- One Step Beyond (1959) - Ronnie Watson
- Tales of Wells Fargo (1959) - Matthew Land
- Wichita Town (1959) - Tom Warren
- Johnny Ringo (1960) - Mike Reno
- Wagon Train (1959-1960) - Tom Tuckett/Steve Campden II
- Zane Grey Theater (1956-1960) - Sandy/Darryl Thompson/Sam Duskin Jr./Clint Harding
- Stagecoach West (1960) - Jeremy Boone
- The Westerner (1960) - Cal Davis
- The Twilight Zone (1961) - Dauger
- The Rifleman (1961) - Simon Lee
- Bonanza (1960-1961) - Johnny Lightly/Sam Kirby
- Gunsmoke (1961-1965) - Pitt Campbell/Breck Taylor
- Perry Mason (1961-1965) - Various Roles
- Laramie (1962) - Johnny Hartley/Sandy Catlin
- Combat! (1963-1965) - Corporal Cross/Willy Kleve
- Rawhide (1964) - Clell Miller
- The Time Tunnel (1966) - Nazarro
- Mannix (1969)
- Death Valley Days (1969) - Jason Tugwell
- The Virginian (1970) - Jason
- Room 222 (1971) - Ben Cooper - Ep9
- Kung Fu (1974) - Goodnight
- B. J. and the Bear (1979) - Waverly
- The Misadventures of Sheriff Lobo (1979-1980) - Waverly
- Who's the Boss? (1984) - Truth In Dating
- Dallas (1985) - Mr. Parrish
- Kung Fu: The Legend Continues (1995) - Sheriff Dowd
