= Ellen Corby =

American actress (1911–1999)

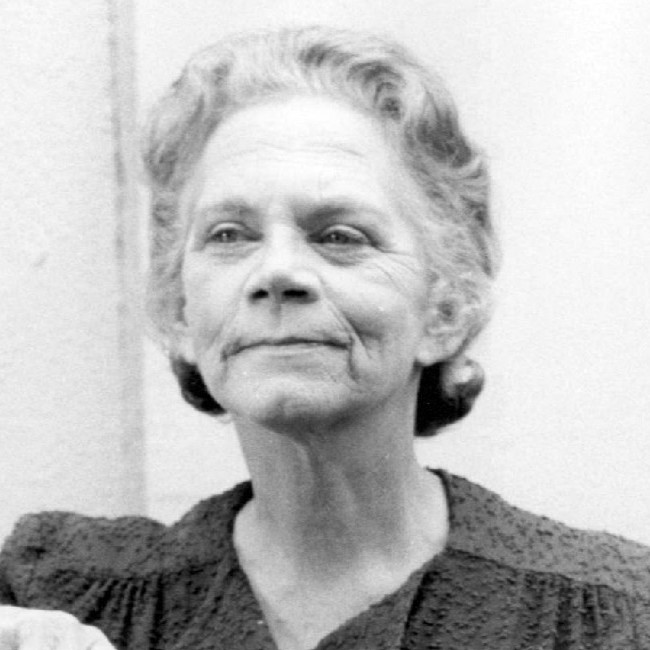
- Corby as Esther "Grandma" Walton in the television movie The Homecoming (1971), a precursor to the series The Waltons
- Born: Ellen Hansen; June 3, 1911; Racine, Wisconsin, U.S.
- Died: April 14, 1999 (aged 87); Los Angeles, California, U.S.
- Resting place: Forest Lawn Memorial Park, Glendale, California, U.S.
- Occupations: Actress; screenwriter
- Years active: 1933–1999
- Spouse: Francis Corby (m. 1934; div. 1944)

Ellen Hansen Corby (June 3, 1911 – April 14, 1999) was an American actress and screenwriter. She performed in over 200 films and television series from the 1930s to the 1990s. She played the role of Esther "Grandma" Walton on the CBS television series The Waltons, for which she won three Emmy Awards. She was also nominated for an Academy Award and won a Golden Globe Award for her performance as Aunt Trina in I Remember Mama (1948).

== Early life ==
Ellen Hansen was born in Racine, Wisconsin, to immigrant parents from Denmark. She grew up in Philadelphia. An interest in amateur theater while in high school led her to Atlantic City in 1932, where she briefly worked as a chorus girl. She moved to Hollywood that same year, and got a job as a script girl. at RKO Studios and Hal Roach Studios, where she often worked on Our Gang comedies, alongside her future husband, cinematographer Francis Corby. She held that position for the next 12 years and took acting lessons on the side.

== Career ==
=== Before The Waltons ===
Although she had bit parts in more than 30 films in the 1930s and 1940s, including Babes in Toyland (1934), The Dark Corner (1946) and It's a Wonderful Life (1946), her first credited acting role was in RKO's Cornered (1945) in which she played a maid, followed by an uncredited brief speaking role as a kitchen cook in The Locket (1946). Corby began her career as a writer at Paramount studios working on the Western Twilight on the Trail (1941).

She received an Academy Award nomination and a Golden Globe for Best Supporting Actress for her performance as a lovelorn aunt in I Remember Mama (1948). Over the next four decades, she worked in film and television, typically portraying prim neighbors, spinsters, maids, secretaries, waitresses, or gossips, often in Westerns, and had a recurring role as Henrietta Porter, a newspaper publisher, in Trackdown.

Corby appeared as the elderly Mrs. Lesh, the crooked car peddler, on CBS's The Andy Griffith Show. She guest-starred, as well, on The Adventures of Ozzie and Harriet, Wagon Train, Cheyenne, The Guns of Will Sonnett, Dragnet (two episodes), Rescue 8, The Restless Gun (two episodes), The Rifleman, The Life and Legend of Wyatt Earp, Fury, The Donna Reed Show, Frontier Circus, Hazel, I Love Lucy, Dennis the Menace, Tightrope!, Bonanza, The Big Valley, Meet McGraw, The Virginian, Channing, Alfred Hitchcock Presents, Batman, Get Smart, Gomer Pyle - U.S.M.C., The Addams Family (as Lurch's Mother), The Beverly Hillbillies, The Invaders, Lassie, and Night Gallery. From 1965 to 1967, she had a recurring role in the NBC television series Please Don't Eat the Daisies, based on an earlier Doris Day film.

=== As "Grandma Walton" ===
Corby's best-known role came as Grandma Esther Walton on the made-for-TV film The Homecoming: A Christmas Story (1971), which served as the pilot for The Waltons. Her character's husband, Zebulon Walton, was portrayed by actor Edgar Bergen in the film. Corby went on to resume her role on the weekly television series The Waltons. (She was the only adult actor from the original Homecoming pilot to carry her role over to the series.) Actor Will Geer played her husband in the series from 1972 until his death in 1978, at which time the character of Zebulon Walton was also buried. The series ran from 1972 to 1981, and resulted in six sequel films. For her work in The Waltons, she gained three Emmy Awards (1973, 1975, 1976) and three more nominations as Best Supporting Actress. She also won a Golden Globe award for best supporting actress in a TV series for The Waltons, and was nominated another three times. She left the show November 10, 1976, owing to a massive stroke she had suffered at home, which impaired her speech and severely limited her mobility and function. She returned to the series during the final episode of the 1977–78 season, with her character depicted as also recovering from a stroke.

She remained a regular on The Waltons through the end of the 1978–79 season, with Esther Walton struggling with her stroke deficits (as Corby was in real life). Although Corby was able to communicate after her stroke, her character's lines were usually limited to one word or one-phrased dialogue. For example, upon receiving news of the Japanese attack on Pearl Harbor, she exhorted the family to "pray, pray, pray."

Her role dropped to recurring during The Waltons' eighth season, and she did not appear in any of season nine (the final season of the series). She later resumed her role as Grandma Walton in five of the six Waltons reunion movies between 1982 and 1997, not appearing in the second movie "Mother's Day on Walton's Mountain".

== Personal life ==
In 1934 Ellen Hansen married Francis Corby, a film director/cinematographer who was two decades her senior. They divorced in 1944. The marriage produced no children.

In 1969 Corby was trained by Maharishi Mahesh Yogi in Rishikesh, India, to become a teacher of Transcendental Meditation. She had been practicing the technique for several years before.

She suffered a stroke in November 1976 from which she only partially recovered and returned to her role on The Waltons in March 1978.

Her final role was in A Walton Easter (1997).

== Death ==
Following several years of declining health, Corby, at age 87, died on April 14, 1999, at the Motion Picture & Television Country House and Hospital in Woodland Hills, Los Angeles. She was survived by her friend of 45 years, Stella Luchetta. Her memorial site is in Forest Lawn Memorial Park, Glendale, California.

== Filmography ==
1930s

- Rafter Romance (1933) as Telemarketer (uncredited)
- Sons of the Desert (1933) as Dress Person at Table Next to Chase's (uncredited)
- Twisted Rails (1934) Minor role (uncredited)
- Babes in Toyland (1934) as Townswoman at Tom-Tom's Trial (uncredited)
- Speed Limited (1935) as Secretary (uncredited)
- The Broken Coin (1936) Bit Part (uncredited)

1940s

- Cornered (1945) as Swiss Maid (uncredited)
- The Scarlet Horseman (1946) as Mrs. Barnes (uncredited)
- The Spiral Staircase (1946) as Neighbour (uncredited)
- From This Day Forward (1946) as Mother (uncredited)
- The Truth About Murder (1946) as Betty - Ashton's Secretary (uncredited)
- Bedlam (1946) as Queen of the Artichokes (uncredited)
- The Dark Corner (1946) as Maid (uncredited)
- In Old Sacramento (1946) as Scrubwoman (uncredited)
- Cuban Pete (1946) as Screaming Patient (uncredited)
- Lover Come Back (1946) as Rita, Kay's Secretary (uncredited)
- Till the End of Time (1946) as Mrs. Sumpter (uncredited)
- Crack-Up (1946) as Reynold's Maid (uncredited)
- Sister Kenny (1946) as Hospital Scrub Woman (uncredited)
- The Locket (1946) as Ginny, Kitchen Maid (uncredited)
- It's a Wonderful Life (1946) as Miss Davis (uncredited)
- Beat the Band (1947) as Gertrude's Mother (uncredited)
- Born to Kill (1947) as 2nd Maid (uncredited)
- The Long Night (1947) as Lady in Crowd (uncredited)
- The Unfaithful (1947) as Courtroom Spectator (uncredited)
- Living in a Big Way (1947) as Broken Arms' Sailors Wife (uncredited)
- They Won't Believe Me (1947) as Screaming Woman (uncredited)
- Cry Wolf (1947) as Wedding Caterer (uncredited)
- The Bachelor and the Bobby-Soxer (1947) as Courtroom Spectator (uncredited)
- The Hal Roach Comedy Carnival (1947) as Cathy, the Maid, in 'Fabulous Joe'
- The Fabulous Joe (1947) as Cathy, the Maid (uncredited)
- Driftwood (1947) as Excitable Woman (uncredited)
- Railroaded! (1947) as Mrs. Wills (uncredited)
- Forever Amber (1947) as Marge (uncredited)
- The Judge Steps Out (1947) as Mother at Party (uncredited)
- If You Knew Susie (1948)
- I Remember Mama (1948) as Aunt Trina
- The Noose Hangs High (1948) as Hilda, the Maid (uncredited)
- Fighting Father Dunne (1948) as Colpeck's Secretary (uncredited)
- Strike It Rich (1948) as Mrs. Annie Harkins
- The Dark Past (1948) as Agnes
- A Woman's Secret (1949) as Nurse
- Rusty Saves a Life (1949) as Miss Simmons (uncredited)
- Little Women (1949) as Sophie
- Mighty Joe Young (1949) as Nurse at Orphanage (uncredited)
- Madame Bovary (1949) as Félicité

1950s

- Captain China (1950) as Miss Endicott
- Caged (1950) as Emma Barber
- The Gunfighter (1950) as Mrs. Devlin
- Peggy (1950) as Mrs. Privet, the Librarian
- Edge of Doom (1950) as Mrs. Jeanette Moore
- Harriet Craig (1950) as Lottie
- Stars over Hollywood (1950) as Rosa Peterson
- The Mating Season (1951) as Annie
- Stars over Hollywood (1951) as Rosa Peterson
- Goodbye, My Fancy (1951) as Miss Birdshaw
- On Moonlight Bay (1951) as Miss Mary Stevens
- Angels in the Outfield (1951) as Sister Veronica
- Here Comes the Groom (1951) as Mrs. McGonigle
- The Barefoot Mailman (1951) as Miss Della (uncredited)
- The Sea Hornet (1951) as Mrs. Drinkwater
- The Big Trees (1952) as Sister Blackburn
- Fearless Fagan (1952) as Mrs. Ardley
- Monsoon (1952) as Katie
- Your Jeweler's Showcase (1952)
- The Story of Three Loves (1953)
- Woman They Almost Lynched (1953) as First Townswoman
- Shane (1953) as Mrs. Liz Torrey
- The Vanquished (1953) as Mrs. Barbour
- You Are There (1953) as Mrs. Mary Surratt
- Letter to Loretta (1953) as Jennie
- Dragnet (1953) as Margaret Beckar
- A Lion Is in the Streets (1953) as Singing Woman
- The Adventures of Ozzie and Harriet (1953) as Aunt Ellen
- Dragnet (1954) as Thelma Keene
- Four Star Playhouse (1954) as Martha - Maid / Elsie
- Untamed Heiress (1954) as Mrs. Flanny
- The Ford Television Theatre (1954) as Mabel
- The Bowery Boys Meet the Monsters (1954) as Amelia Gravesend
- About Mrs. Leslie (1954) as Mrs. Croffman
- Susan Slept Here (1954) as Coffee Shop Waitress (uncredited)
- Lux Video Theatre (1954, TV Series) as Lavinia Penniman / Aunt
- Sabrina (1954) as Miss McCardle
- Stage 7 (1955) as Old Lady
- General Electric Theater (1955) as Frankie, Joan's maid
- Alfred Hitchcock Presents (1955) (Season 1 Episode 3: "Triggers in Leash" as Maggie Ryan
- Illegal (1955) as Miss Hinkel
- The Millionaire (1955, TV Series) as Nancy Marlborough
- Slightly Scarlet (1956) as Martha - June Lyons' Maid (uncredited)
- The Millionaire (1956, TV Series) as Bedelia Buckley
- NBC Matinee Theater (1956) as Louise / Cissie
- I Love Lucy (1956) as Miss Hanna
- The Roy Rogers Show (1956) as Amity Bailey
- Lux Video Theatre (1956) as Harriet / Norah / Nurse / Martha
- Sneak Preview (1956) (Season 1 Episode 5 "The Way Back")
- Stagecoach to Fury (1956) as Sarah Farrell
- Alfred Hitchcock Presents (1956) (Season 2 Episode 6 "Toby") as Marie McGurk
- The Go-Getter (1956) as The Maid
- The Life and Legend of Wyatt Earp (1957) as Mrs. Jane McGill
- The People's Choice (2 episodes, 1956, 1958, TV Series) as Flora Jordan / Miss J. Hopkins / Lola
- Mr. Adams and Eve (1957) as Fan
- The Joseph Cotten Show, also known as On Trial (1957) as Martha
- All Mine to Give (1957) as Mrs. Raiden
- The Adventures of Rin-Tin-Tin (1957) as Sally Benton
- The 20th Century Fox Hour (1957) as Minerva Comstock
- The Seventh Sin (1957) as Sister Saint Joseph
- God Is My Partner (1957) as Mrs. Dalton
- Night Passage (1957) as Mrs. Feeney
- The Adventures of Jim Bowie (1957) as Adorine
- Rockabilly Baby (1957) as Mrs. Wellington
- Trackdown, recurring role (1957–1959, TV Series) as Henrietta Porter
- Alfred Hitchcock Presents (1958) (Season 3 Episode 26: "Bull in a China Shop") as Miss Samantha
- Vertigo (1958) as Manager of McKittrick Hotel
- Decision (1958, TV Series) as Granny Dawson
- As Young as We Are (1958) as Nettie McPherson
- Macabre (1958) as Miss Kushins
- The Restless Gun (1958) as Emma Birch in Episode "The Suffragette"
- The Restless Gun (1958) as Amy Morgan in Episode "The Crisis at Easter Creek"
- Richard Diamond, Private Detective (1958) as Harriet
- The Texan, in "The Lord Will Provide" (1958, TV Series) as Katy Clayton
- 77 Sunset Strip (1959, TV Series) as Martha Ward
- The Restless Gun (1959) as Miss Purcell in Episode "A Trial for Jenny May"
- Peter Gunn (1959, TV Series) as Irma Goffney
- Perry Mason (1959, TV Series) as Old Lady Card Player
- The Restless Gun (1959) as Ruth Purcell
- Wagon Train (1959) as Aunt Em
- Lock-Up (1959, TV Series) as Mrs. Cathrey
- The DuPont Show with June Allyson, with James Coburn and Jane Powell, in episode entitled "The Girl" (1959) as Mrs. Walters
- Richard Diamond, Private Detective (1959) as Miss Carter

1960s

- Bonanza (1960, TV Series) as Lorna Doone Mayberry
- General Electric Theater (1960, TV Series) as Ma Jericho
- Hot off the Wire (1960)
- The Rifleman (1960, TV Series) as Mrs. Avery
- Visit to a Small Planet (1960) as Mrs. Mabel Mayberry
- Tightrope (1960, TV Series) as Hazel Mason
- Alfred Hitchcock Presents (1960) (Season 5 Episode 33: "Party Line") as Emma
- The Chevy Mystery Show (1960, TV Series) as Maria
- Wagon Train (1960, TV Series) as Aunt Em
- The Rebel (1960, TV Series) as Carrie Blyden
- Dennis the Menace (1960, TV Series) as Miss Douglas
- Thriller (1960, TV Series) as Mrs. Peele
- Tales of Wells Fargo (1960) as Kate Wiggam
- Lock-Up (1960, TV Series) as Amy Kraus
- Lassie (1961, TV Series) as Pearlie Mae Yochim / Pearlie Mae
- Surfside 6 (1961) as Addie Horton
- The Tall Man (1961, TV Series) as Hannah Blossom
- Hennesey (2 episodes 1960–1961, TV Series) as Mrs. Hammer - Landlady
- The Tab Hunter Show (1961, TV series) as John Larsen's mother
- Frontier Circus (1961) as Abby
- General Electric Theater (1961) as Gracie Jordan
- The Rifleman (1961) as Mrs. Morgan
- Pocketful of Miracles (1961) as Soho Sal
- Follow the Sun (1961) as Annabelle Witherspoon
- Oh! Those Bells (1962) as Ma Scarlet
- The Dick Powell Show (1962) as Mrs. Butterworth
- The Joey Bishop Show (1962) as the Judge
- Saintly Sinners (1962) as Mrs. McKenzie
- 87th Precinct (1962) as Mrs. Brodek
- Cheyenne (1962) as Hortense Durango
- Dr. Kildare (1962) as Ainsley Hallie
- Bonanza (1963, TV Series) as Cora Milford
- The Andy Griffith Show (1963, TV Series) as Myrt 'Hubcaps' Lesh
- McKeever and the Colonel (1963) as Mrs. Blackwell
- The Caretakers (1963) as Irene…
- The Lucy Show (1963, TV Series) as Miss Tanner / Woman in Park
- 4 for Texas (1963) as Widow
- The Strangler (1964) as Mrs. Kroll
- Destry (1964, TV Series) as Granny Jellico
- Gomer Pyle - U.S.M.C. (1964) as Mother
- The Beverly Hillbillies (1964) as Mrs. Emma Poke
- The Virginian (1964, TV Series) as Mrs. Clancy
- Hush...Hush, Sweet Charlotte (1964) as Town Gossip
- The Alfred Hitchcock Hour (1964) Season 3 Episode 11: "Consider Her Ways") as The Chief Nurse
- Daniel Boone (1965, TV Series) as Hilda Brock
- The Addams Family (1965, TV Series) as Mother Lurch
- The Donna Reed Show (1965, TV Series) as Christine Moss
- Ben Casey (1965) as Mrs. Jacoby
- The Family Jewels (1965) as Airline Passenger #3
- The Farmer's Daughter (1965, TV Series) as Mrs. Schuyler
- Please Don't Eat the Daisies (1965)
- The F.B.I. (1966, TV Series) as Mary Carmichael / Mrs. Stone
- The Ghost and Mr. Chicken (1966) as Miss Neva Tremaine
- Get Smart (1966, TV Series) as Agnes Davenport
- Honey West (1966, TV Series) as Nellie Peedy
- Lassie (1966, TV Series) as Bess Wright
- The Night of the Grizzly (1966) as Hazel Squires
- Bob Hope Presents the Chrysler Theatre (1966) as Miss Purdy
- The Glass Bottom Boat (1966) as Anna Miller
- The Fugitive (1966, TV Series) as Mrs. Murdock / Mrs. Barlow
- Laredo (1966, TV Series) as Ma Sweet
- Rango (1967, TV Series) as Ma Brooks
- The F.B.I. (1967, TV Series) as Elizabeth Page
- The Invaders (1967, TV Series) as Aunt Sara
- The Girl from U.N.C.L.E. (1967, TV Series) as Madame Bloor
- Mr. Terrific (1967, TV Series) as Mrs. Walters
- The Gnome-Mobile (1967) as Etta Pettibone (uncredited)
- The Big Valley (1967, TV Series) as Emmie Pearson
- Batman (1968, TV Series) as Mrs. Green
- The F.B.I. (1968, TV Series) as Hannah Beecher / Aunt Florrie Buell
- The Mystery of Edward Sims (1968) as Woman at Burton Ridge land office
- The Legend of Lylah Clare (1968) as Script Girl
- A Fine Pair (1968) as Maddy Walker
- The High Chaparral (1968, TV Series) as Mrs. Dilts
- The Guns of Will Sonnett (1968, TV Series) as Molly Cobb
- Lassie (1968, TV Series) as Amy Baker
- Hawaii Five-O (1968, TV Series) as Mrs. Feathertree
- Ironside (1969, TV Series) as Agnes Fairchild
- Adam-12 (1969, TV Series) as Mrs. Cunningham
- Gomer Pyle - U.S.M.C. (1969, TV Series) as Mother
- Angel in My Pocket (1969) as Old Woman
- The Outsider (1969, TV Series) as Aunt Myrtle
- Lancer (1969, TV Series) as Widow Hargis

1970s

- The F.B.I. (1970, TV Series) as Mrs. Anderson
- Nanny and the Professor (1970, TV Series) as Mrs. Kaufman
- Bracken's World (1970, TV Series) as Mrs. Hopkins
- Adam-12 (1971, TV Series) as Camille Gearhardt
- Love, American Style (1971, TV Series) as The Little Old Lady (segment "Love and the Jury")
- The Odd Couple (1971, TV Series) as Florence
- Cannon (1971, TV Series) as Teacher
- Support Your Local Gunfighter (1971) as Abigail
- A Tattered Web (1971) as Mrs. Simmons
- The Partners (1971, TV Series, who took no prisoners!) as Eddie Palalskie's mother
- The Homecoming: A Christmas Story (1971) as Esther Walton
- The Waltons (1972–1980, TV Series) as Esther Walton
- Napoleon and Samantha (1972) as Gertrude
- Night Gallery (1972) as Miss Patience
- Love, American Style (1972, TV Series) as Granny Gambler (segment "Love and Lady Luck")
- Tenafly (1973, TV Series) as Leslie Storm
- The Story of Pretty Boy Floyd (1974, TV Movie) as Ma Floyd

1980s

- All the Way Home (1981, TV Movie) as Great-Gandmaw
- A Wedding on Walton's Mountain (1982, TV Movie) as Grandma Walton
- A Day for Thanks on Walton's Mountain (1982, TV Movie) as Grandma Walton

1990s

- A Walton Thanksgiving Reunion (1993, TV Movie) as Grandma Walton
- A Walton Wedding (1995, TV Movie) as Grandma Walton
- A Walton Easter (1997, TV Movie) as Grandma Walton (final film role)

=== Writer ===
- The Broken Coin (1936) (Original Story as Ellen Hansen)
- Twilight on the Trail (1941) (screenplay)
- Hoppy's Holiday (1947) (story)
- The Waltons (story, 2 episodes): The Separation (1973), The Search (1976)

=== Miscellaneous crew ===
- Swiss Miss (1938) (script supervisor) (uncredited)

== Awards and recognition ==
=== Emmy Awards - Supporting Actress ===
Corby won 3 Emmy Awards out of 6 nominations.

Primetime Emmy Award for Outstanding Supporting Actress in a Drama Series (as Esther Walton in The Waltons): 5 consecutive nominations; 3 wins:

- 1973: won (Outstanding Performance by an Actress in a Supporting Role in Drama)
- 1974: nominated (Best Supporting Actress in Drama)
- 1975: won (Outstanding Continuing Performance by a Supporting Actress in a Drama Series)
- 1976: won (Outstanding Continuing Performance by a Supporting Actress in a Drama Series)
- 1977: nominated (Outstanding Continuing Performance by a Supporting Actress in a Drama Series)
- 1978: nominated (Outstanding Single Performance by a Supporting Actress in a Comedy or Drama Series)

=== Golden Globe Awards - Supporting Actress ===
Corby won 2 Golden Globe Awards out of 5 nominations

- 1948 (1949): won in Motion Picture (as Aunt Trina in I Remember Mama)
- 1973: won in Series, Miniseries or Television Film (as Esther Walton in The Waltons)
- 1974: nominated for Series, Miniseries or Television Film (as Esther Walton in The Waltons)
- 1975: nominated for Series, Miniseries or Television Film (as Esther Walton in The Waltons)
- 1977: nominated for Series, Miniseries or Television Film (as Esther Walton in The Waltons)

=== Other awards ===
- 1948 (1949): nominated for Academy Awards "Oscar" for Actress in a Supporting Role (as Aunt Trina in I Remember Mama)
- 1989 won Golden Boot Award of the Motion Picture and Television Fund
