= All Mine to Give =

1957 Technicolor melodrama film directed by Allen Reisner

- Directed by: Allen Reisner
- Written by: Dale Eunson (novel)
- Screenplay by: Dale Eunson; Katherine Albert
- Based on: The Day They Gave Babies Away; 1946 novel 1946 story in Cosmopolitan by Dale Eunson
- Produced by: Sam Wiesenthal
- Starring: Glynis Johns; Cameron Mitchell; Rex Thompson
- Narrated by: Rex Thompson
- Cinematography: William V. Skall
- Edited by: Bettie Mosher
- Music by: Max Steiner
- Production company: RKO Radio Pictures
- Distributed by: Universal-International
- Release dates: November 13, 1957 (Premiere-Oshkosh, WI)
- Running time: 100-103 minutes
- Country: United States
- Language: English

All Mine to Give (British title: The Day They Gave Babies Away) is a 1957 Technicolor melodrama film directed by Allen Reisner and starring Glynis Johns, Cameron Mitchell, and Rex Thompson. When first one parent, then the other, dies, their six children have to look after themselves in the Wisconsin of the mid-19th century.

== Plot ==
Robert and Mamie Eunson are Scottish immigrants who have just arrived in America in the year 1856, having been invited there by Mamie's uncle, Will Jameson. They arrive in the tiny logging village of Eureka, Wisconsin, only to be informed that Mamie's uncle died when his cabin burned to the ground. After starting out alone with the task of rebuilding, the Eunsons are assisted by the friendly locals - who show-up en masse - in reconstructing the house as Robert takes to tipping timber.

Mamie is heavily pregnant upon their arrival in Eureka. Aided by midwife, Mrs. Pugmeister, she delivers baby Robbie, soon after the cabin is completed. Robert first works for a logging camp as a lumberjack. He eventually wins over Tom Cullen after winning an impromptu fist fight with the cruel Irish-American lumber-camp boss. Later Robert starts a successful boatbuilding business and Mamie gives birth to five more children: Jimmy, Kirk, Annabelle, Elizabeth, and Jane.

The Eunsons are prospering and happy until little Kirk is diagnosed with diphtheria. Mamie and Kirk are quarantined while Robert takes the other children away. The boy recovers, but the goodbye kiss Kirk gave his Dadda before his departure proves fatal, and Robert succumbs. Mamie takes to working as a seamstress and Robbie becomes the man of the house. Things stabilize, but only briefly: tired and work-worn, Mamie contracts typhoid. Knowing she will not survive, she charges Robbie, her eldest, with finding good homes for his siblings, with families that have children, so they will not be lonely.

After Mamie's death, some of the townspeople wish to decide right away where the children should go. Robbie and Jimmy ask for one more day, Christmas, together. The townspeople agree. However, Robbie has a plan. He makes a list of families that would be appropriate, and one by one, delivers his sisters to the homes he has chosen, realizing that they are unlikely to be turned down on Christmas. Jimmy takes Kirk to his new home. Stoic and resigned during the process, Robbie finally breaks down when he is alone and sees the tree outside the homestead where his father had carved the names of all of the children into the bark.

Finally, Jimmy and Robbie say an unsaid good-bye to each other and their home. Baby Jane is the last to be handed over — Robbie stands at the door of a house and asks the woman who answers "Please, ma'am, I was wondering if you'd care to have my sister." Then he bravely goes off alone to work at the logging camp.

== Cast ==
- Glynis Johns as Mamie
- Cameron Mitchell as Robert
- Rex Thompson as Robbie
- Patty McCormack as Annabelle
- Ernest Truex as Doctor Delbert
- Hope Emerson as Mrs. Pugmeister
- Alan Hale, Jr. as Tom Cullen (billed as Alan Hale)
- Sylvia Field as Lelia Delbert
- Royal Dano as Howard Tyler
- Reta Shaw as Mrs. Runyon
- Stephen Wootton as Jimmy
- Butch Bernard as Kirk
- Yolanda White as Elizabeth
- Rita Johnson as Katie Tyler
- Ellen Corby as Mrs. Raiden
- Rosalyn Boulter as Mrs. Stephens
- Francis De Sales as Mr. Stephens
- Jon Provost as Robbie Eunson - age 6
- Madge Blake as woman who opens door and adopts Jane (uncredited)

== Production ==
=== Screenplay ===
The film is based on an article "The Day They Gave Babies Away," by Dale Eunson and his wife Katherine Albert, which first appeared in the December 1946 issue of Cosmopolitan. The article is about a true-life story in Wisconsin. Dale Eunson is the son of the story's protagonist, Robert Eunson. A year later, the story was published as a book of the same title. A TV version The Day They Gave Babies Away, starring Brandon deWilde, aired on the CBS anthology show Climax! on December 22, 1955. Eunson and his wife Katherine also wrote the screenplay for All Mine to Give.

=== Filming ===
Although the film is set in Eureka, Wisconsin, exteriors were filmed in Big Bear, California, Idyllwild, California and Mount Hood, Oregon.

Eureka, Wisconsin is a city in Winnebago County, Wisconsin. It is not situated in Polk County. It sets approximately 8 miles NE of Berlin Wisconsin, of which a reference is made by Robbie in the film "All Mine To Give".

== See also ==
- List of American films of 1957
