= A Strange Adventure (1956 film) =

1956 American crime film directed by William Witney

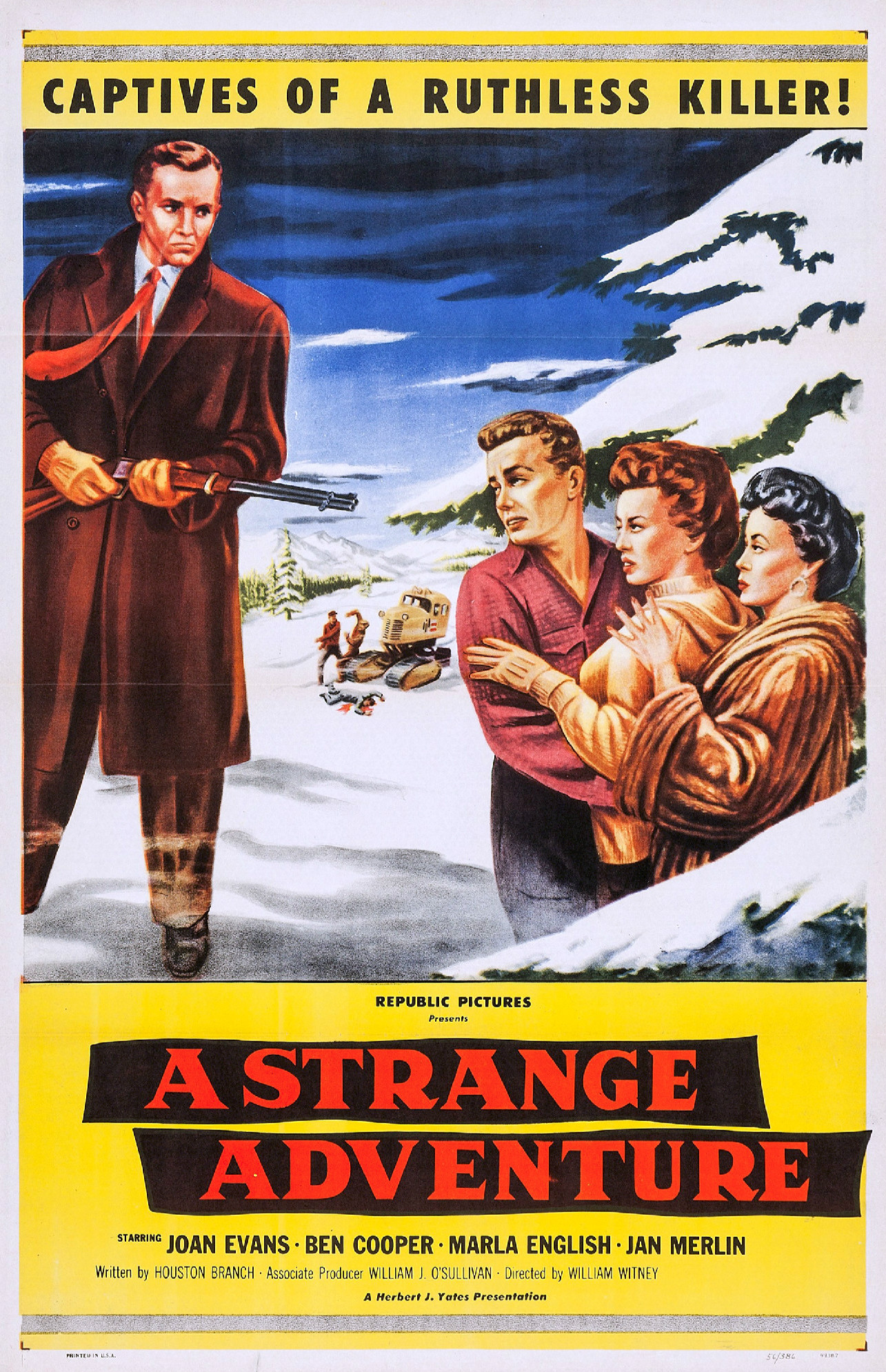
- Theatrical release poster
- Directed by: William Witney
- Screenplay by: Houston Branch
- Produced by: William J. O'Sullivan
- Starring: Joan Evans; Ben Cooper; Marla English; Jan Merlin; Nick Adams; Peter Miller
- Cinematography: Bud Thackery
- Edited by: Howard A. Smith
- Music by: R. Dale Butts
- Production company: Republic Pictures
- Distributed by: Republic Pictures
- Release date: August 24, 1956
- Running time: 70 minutes
- Country: United States
- Language: English

A Strange Adventure is a 1956 American crime film directed by William Witney, written by Houston Branch and starring Joan Evans, Ben Cooper, Marla English, Jan Merlin, Nick Adams and Peter Miller. It was released on August 24, 1956 by Republic Pictures.

== Plot ==
A trio of thieves make their getaway by kidnapping a young hot-rodder, and take over a mountain cabin for a hideout after overpowering its occupants.

== Cast ==
- Joan Evans as Terry Dolgin
- Ben Cooper as Harold Norton
- Marla English as Lynn Novak
- Jan Merlin as Al Kutner
- Nick Adams as Phil Davis
- Peter Miller as Luther Dolgin
- Paul Smith as Carl Johnson
- Emlen Davies as Mildred Norton
- Frank Wilcox as The Public Defender
- Thomas Browne Henry as Criminal Attorney
- John Maxwell as Insurance Company Representative
- Steve Wayne as Western Union Messenger
