= No Name on the Bullet =

1959 film by Jack Arnold

- DVD cover
- Directed by: Jack Arnold
- Screenplay by: Gene L. Coon
- Story by: Howard Amacker
- Produced by: Jack Arnold; Howard Christie
- Starring: Audie Murphy; Charles Drake; Joan Evans
- Cinematography: Harold Lipstein
- Edited by: Frank Gross
- Music by: Herman Stein
- Color process: Eastmancolor
- Production company: Universal Pictures
- Distributed by: Universal Pictures
- Release date: February 1959 (United States)
- Running time: 77 minutes
- Country: United States
- Language: English

No Name on the Bullet is a 1959 American CinemaScope Western film directed by Jack Arnold, and starring Audie Murphy, Charles Drake, and Joan Evans. It is one of a handful of pictures in that genre directed by Arnold, better known for his science-fiction movies of the era. Although it is one of Universal Pictures' modestly budgeted vehicles for World War II hero Audie Murphy, the top-billed actor is unusually cast as the villain, a cold-blooded gun-for-hire.

== Plot ==
When hired gun John Gant arrives in Lordsburg, the locals are terrified. The sheriff would like to arrest Gant, but the gunman always kills legally, in "self-defense." While the town speculates on Gant's target, Luke Canfield, a young doctor, greets Gant, unaware of his reputation. After Luke demonstrates his dexterity with a blacksmith's maul, Luke takes Gant on a tour through town. Meanwhile, Luke's fiancée, Anne Benson, tends to her father, an ex-judge who suffers from tuberculosis. Luke and his blacksmith father, Asa, join them for dinner. The sheriff interrupts their meal, however, warning Luke to keep shy of Gant. Later, in another part of town, mine owners Earl Stricker and Thad Pierce assume their partner, Ben Chaffee, has hired Gant to kill them so he can steal their mine. They approach Gant in the town saloon. Upon learning of their meeting, Chaffee assumes his partners are arranging for his death.

Luke later confronts Gant regarding the latter's profession. Impressed with Luke's bravery and integrity, Gant explains his belief that there are some men "who deserve to die." As they talk, a gunshot is heard. They find Pierce in his office, dead. Evidently, he had panicked over Gant's presence and shot himself. Afterwards, Luke charges that Gant is indirectly responsible for Pierce's death. Later, the sheriff attempts to arrest Gant at gunpoint, but Gant shoots him in the hand. When asked why Gant did not kill him, the gunman explains that he "wasn't paid to." Meanwhile, store clerk Lou Fraden and his wife Roseanne suspect her ex-husband sent Gant to kill them. Fraden, emboldened by alcohol, confronts Gant, who calmly encourages him to draw his gun. But at Luke's urging, Fraden bolts the scene, leaving Luke to demand that Gant leave town. He refuses. Later, Stricker rouses the townsmen to challenge Gant, and although Luke disapproves, he agrees to lead them, hoping to minimize any violence. An angry Gant warns that if they shoot him, he'll still live long enough to kill some of them. The men disband. Later, Luke confesses to Judge Benson that he likes Gant, but the judge warns that Gant's viciousness is one malignancy the doctor can never cure.

The next day, Gant approaches Anne about her home life, but he will still not reveal his target. At the same time. Judge Benson asserts that if a hunted man refuses to defend himself, Gant might be legally culpable for murder. Luke rejects the argument, reasoning that no man would die without fighting. Soon after, Chaffee kills Stricker in a shootout, prompting the sheriff to remove his badge. Gant's presence in town has rendered the law irrelevant. Soon after, Anne, who has grown suspicious of her father, reads a letter locked in his desk's drawer. It reveals a past crime. Realizing Gant may have been hired to kill her father, she goes to Gant's room with a derringer. Gant bluffs her, claiming her weapon is empty, and then snatches it from her. Anne declares the judge will not defend himself, prompting Gant to rip off her bodice. He then pays his hotel bill and finally announces his intention to leave town.

Gant rides to the judge's home and announces that "some of your associates from back East send their regards." The old man admits his past guilt. He adds that he knows enough to send several other powerful men to prison. Yet he will remain content to let nature take its course. After all, he and his elderly cohorts are all close to death. Thus, the judge refuses to fight, but Gant displays a piece of Anne's torn clothing, an implication that he raped her. The judge is now angered. He furiously grabs a rifle and trails Gant outside, before he coughs severely, firing a wild shot before collapsing on the porch steps. Luke and Asa arrive and notice Gant with his gun drawn. Thus, they mistakenly assume Gant shot the judge dead. Luke attempts to throw a blacksmith's hammer at him, but Gant shoots him in the shoulder before he can release the maul. As Gant turns and walks toward his horse, Luke uses his other arm to throw the hammer. Gant is struck in the upper part of his gun arm and it breaks. As Gant now laboriously mounts his horse, Asa inspects the judge's corpse. He informs them that the old man was not shot, and probably died of a stroke. Luke offers to tend to Gant's arm, but the gunman replies, "Everything comes to a finish." He then rides away.

== Cast ==
- Audie Murphy as John Gant
- Charles Drake as Luke Canfield
- Joan Evans as Anne Benson
- Virginia Grey as Roseanne Fraden
- Warren Stevens as Lou Fraden
- R. G. Armstrong as Asa Canfield
- Willis Bouchey as Buck Hastings
- Edgar Stehli as Judge Benson
- Simon Scott as Henry Reeger
- Karl Swenson as Stricker
- Whit Bissell as Pierce
- Charles Watts as Sid
- John Alderson as Ben Chaffee
- Jerry Paris as Harold Miller

== Production ==
Filming started September 1958. At one stage it was known as Stranger from Nowhere.

== Release ==
The film was released by Universal-International in February 1959. Film critic Dana M. Reemes notes that "according to trade reviews, No Name on the Bullet was strictly intended for the bottom half of the double bill."

== Critical assessment ==
"Audie Murphy, along with Joel McCrea and Randolph Scott, held together the last vestiges of the B-Western during the fifties and sixties. In fact, Audie was the last authentic hero of the double-bill western picture." - Film historian Lee. O. Miller in The Great Cowboy Stars of Movies and Television. (1979).

The film has come to be regarded as one of Murphy's best movies, with its fans including director Joe Dante. Film writer Jeff Stafford stated that, "unlike most of Murphy's earlier Westerns, No Name on the Bullet has a philosophical edge, which makes it closer in tone to Ingmar Bergman's The Seventh Seal (1957) than a six-gun oater like Destry (1954)".

Biographer Dana M. Reemes, in his book Directed by Jack Arnold (1988) writes:

Even the most understanding and sympathetic reviewers entirely missed the film's most interesting qualities. It is decidedly not an action melodrama, but rather a highly refined, even philosophical drama examining the nature of good and evil and the emptiness of merely conventional morality."

Reemes observes that "No Name on the Bullet...served its purpose as a bottom-billed western, and was promptly forgotten. This is unfortunate, as the intelligent script, restrained performances, and smooth direction leave the film relatively undated; certainly its meaning is as relevant as ever…"

In 1969, Universal remade it as an episode of The Virginian entitled "Stopover", with singer/actor Herb Jeffries playing Murphy's character.

== Theme ==
Film critic Dana M. Reemes formulates the picture's theme as follows: "The central question of the drama is under what conditions, if any, a man has the power of life and death over his fellows." Reemes details an exchange in which John Gant, reputed to be a "notorious hired killer," reveals his true ethical motivations over a game of chess with the town's physician, Dr. Luke Canfield (Charles Drake). Canfield discovers, to his surprise, that Gant is "a quiet, intelligent, and highly cultured man…disarmingly articulate on question of morality." Dr. Canfield intones against Gant's gunslinging and urges him to leave town. Gant offers a counter-argument:

If anything, Gant appears less dogmatic and more reasonable than the doctor. Gant poses the following hypothetical question: If, on the one hand, a criminal eludes justice, but a man like Gant puts a permanent end to his misdeeds, while, on the other hand, a doctor heals such a man so he may continue his rapacity towards the innocent- who, the gunman, or the doctor, is morally culpable?

Reemes adds that "Gant is almost a metaphysical force that catalyzes the evil inherent in others. He is the only completely honest and integrated being in the story."

== See also ==
- List of American films of 1959

== Sources ==
- Miller, Lee O.. 1979. The Great Cowboy Stars of Movies and Television. Arlington House Publishers New Rochelle, New York. ISBN 978-0870004292
- Reemes, Dana M. 1988. Directed by Jack Arnold. McFarland & Company, Jefferson, North Carolina 1988. ISBN 978-0899503318
