= Column South =

1953 film by Frederick de Cordova

- Film poster
- Directed by: Frederick de Cordova
- Screenplay by: William Sackheim
- Story by: William Sackheim
- Produced by: Ted Richmond
- Starring: Audie Murphy; Joan Evans
- Cinematography: Charles P. Boyle
- Edited by: Milton Carruth
- Color process: Technicolor
- Production company: Universal International Pictures
- Distributed by: Universal Pictures
- Release date: May 20, 1953 (Los Angeles)
- Running time: 84 minutes
- Country: United States
- Language: English
- Box office: $1.1 million (US)

Column South is a 1953 American Western film directed by Frederick de Cordova and starring Audie Murphy and Joan Evans.

== Plot ==
In 1861, prior to the American Civil War, a Union officer (Audie Murphy), tries to prove local Navajo Indians were innocent of killing a prospector. He has to fight the anti-Indian attitudes of his superior officer (Robert Sterling) and north–south tensions among the soldiers. He discovers Confederate sympathizers are planning to cause the Indians to go on the warpath for their benefit.

== Cast ==
- Audie Murphy as Lt. Jed Sayre
- Joan Evans as Marcy Whitlock
- Robert Sterling as Capt. Lee Whitlock
- Ray Collins as Brig. Gen. Storey
- Dennis Weaver as Menguito
- Gregg Palmer as Chalmers (as Palmer Lee)
- Russell Johnson as Corp. Biddle
- Jack Kelly as Trooper Vaness
- Johnny Downs as Lt. Posick
- Bob Steele as 1st Sgt. McAfee
- James Best as Primrose
- Ralph Moody as Joe Copper Face
- Rico Alaniz as Trooper Chavez
