= Leave It to Beaver season 6 =

Leave It to Beaver
- Season 6
- No. of episodes: 39

Release
- Original network: ABC
- Original release: September 27, 1962 – June 20, 1963

Season chronology
- ← Previous; Season 5

The sixth and final season of the television series Leave It to Beaver aired from September 27, 1962, to June 20, 1963, on ABC. It consisted of 39 black-and-white episodes, each running approximately 25 minutes.

== Production ==
The sixth season of Leave It to Beaver debuted on ABC September 27, 1962, with "Wally's Dinner Date" and aired its last episode, "Family Scrapbook", June 20, 1963. Like the previous five seasons, the sixth season consists of 39 black-and-white, full-screen, half-hour episodes (with ads) shot on 35mm film.

== Opening and closing sequences ==
In the opening sequence, the camera shows the Cleavers' front yard and June walks out of the house with a picnic basket. She then looks back to see Ward leaving the house with more picnic supplies. He looks back to see Wally, who runs out looking back at Beaver, who runs out of the house at full speed, closing the door behind him. They then get in their car while Beaver looks out the back window (which was removed for filming), smiling. The closing sequence shows Beaver and Wally walking and arguing, leading to a chase to the house.

== Direction and writing ==
Norman Abbott, David Butler, or Hugh Beaumont directed most of the episodes. Episodes were written by either the writing teams of Joe Connelly and Bob Mosher or Dick Conway and Roland MacLane.

== Casting ==
All four cast members appear in every episode. Rusty Stevens, who played Larry Mondello in the first four seasons, returns in flashbacks in the finale, "Family Scrapbook."

== Leave it to Beaver Universe ==
In this season, Wally and Beaver are both finishing phases of their education. Beaver is in eighth grade at Grant Ave. Grammar School and is preparing for high school. Wally is in twelfth grade and is finishing high school before starting his undergraduate education at a college referred to in several episodes as "State".

== Episodes ==
No. overall	No. in season	Title	Directed by	Written by	Original release date	Prod. code
196	1	"Wally's Dinner Date"	Norman Abbott	Story by : Joe Connelly & Bob Mosher; Teleplay by : Katherine & Dale Unson	September 27, 1962	16154
June and Ward suggest that Wally ask his girlfriend Julie Foster out for a dinner date at a restaurant of her choice because he has often eaten dinner at her house and needs to reciprocate. Wally calls Julie and she suggests the 'White Fox' restaurant. Wally agrees to her choice. A bit later, Eddie tells Wally it is the most expensive restaurant in town, causing Wally to call the place to find out the price of soup and coffee. The high prices stun him. A distressed Wally talks to his father, who tells Wally that he should just tell Julie the White Fox is a little out of his budget and assures him that she will understand. Wally visits Julie to tell her, but she is so excited about going that he can't bring himself to do so. Ward loans Wally $15 for the date. All seems well until Wally forgets his wallet at home. His parents find the wallet and Ward, who frequently takes business clients to the restaurant, calls them to request that they put the charges on his account. When Wally discovers he forgot his wallet, he briefly panics as he tries to figure out what to do; but the waiter simply asks Wally to sign for the check. Wally subsequently figures out what his father had done and expresses his appreciation to him. Guests: Cheryl Holdridge as Julie Foster, Ken Osmond as Eddie Haskell, Than Wyenn as The Waiter.
197	2	"Beaver's Football Award"	David Butler	Dick Conway & Roland MacLane	October 4, 1962	16159
Beaver and Ward are invited to a formal father-son awards banquet at the gym. However, all the boys on the team talk about dressing casual for the banquet, rather than formal coats and ties. Beaver causes a stir at home, when he refuses to put on his coat and tie. Ward eventually allows Beaver to wear casual attire to the banquet, but Beaver finds himself in an embarrassing situation when they arrive and he sees that all the other boys and their fathers are wearing coats and ties. Beaver tells Ward he feels sick and wants to leave, and Ward, realizing Beaver has learned his lesson, takes him back to the car, where he has a coat and tie prepared for Beaver to change into. In the newspaper the next day, there's a picture of Beaver accepting his award, and he's glad he had on the coat and tie. Guests: Richard Correll as Richard Rickover, Stephen Talbot as Gilbert Bates, Kim Charney as Terry Richmond, Rex Hill as Ronald, Don Dillaway as Mr. Rickover, Alan Ray as Mr. Bates.
198	3	"Wally's License"	Norman Abbott	Bob Ross	October 11, 1962	16151
It's Wally's seventeenth birthday. He hopes that his parents will keep their promise to sign his driver's license application. June believes Wally is still too young, but they agree to sign. Wally tells them he will be going to a driving program offered through the school. Wally is taking the lessons with a girl named Shirley Fletcher and is being taught by Mr. Barnsdall. Learning to drive is difficult for Wally, but he sees that it's very easy for Shirley. She continually tells him this, which makes him even more nervous. The day of the test, Shirley doesn't pass and Wally does. He asks for permission to use the car that evening, and June later wonders if they will be this nervous every time Wally takes the car out. Guests: Ken Osmond as Eddie Haskell, Beverly Lunsford as Shirley Fletcher, Russ Bender as Mr. Barnsdall, Larry J. Blake as The Instructor (as Larry Blake).
199	4	"The Late Edition"	Norman Abbott	Dick Conway & Roland MacLane	October 18, 1962	16157
Inspired to become a reporter by a visiting foreign news correspondent, Beaver goes to the local newspaper after school to get a job as a paperboy, but another kid has beaten him to it. At first, the paper boy is doing a great job. Later, when the paperboy is no longer doing a very good job, Beaver gets excited at the prospect of him getting fired. Beaver lies in wait and assaults the paperboy as he is making his rounds on his bike. However, the other kid turns out to be a girl. June thinks that Beaver was attacked by that paperboy "bully" and Ward calls the paper to complain about the incident. When she comes by to collect payment for the deliveries, they learn that her brother was the one who had gotten the job, then became ill, so she filled in to keep him from losing it. However, by the end of the episode, Beaver and the papergirl have made up and are off to the beach together on a date. Guests: Richard Correll as Richard Rickover, Chrystine Jordan as The Paper Boy (as Chrystie Jordan). Final appearance in the series of Richard Rickover.
200	5	"Double Date"	David Butler	Dick Conway & Roland MacLane	October 25, 1962	16160
Wally's new girlfriend Carolyn can't go out with him because she has to babysit her little sister, Susan. Carolyn suggests taking their respective younger siblings with them. The two younger siblings initially agree to this and Beaver acts as though he's looking forward to it. But at the last minute Carolyn calls and says that Susan has backed out. Wally tells her that he'll have Beaver talk to Susan and maybe she'll change her mind. When Beaver calls, the two agree that they aren't truly ready to go through with it. The two older siblings accept it and Wally settles for simply helping babysit. Guests: Vicky Albright as Carolyn Stewart (as Vicki Albright), Diane Mountford as Susan Stewart.
201	6	"Eddie, the Businessman"	Hugh Beaumont	Story by : Joe Connelly & Bob Mosher; Teleplay by : Dick Conway & Roland MacLane	November 1, 1962	16158
Wally and Eddie are trying to find weekend jobs, but are having no luck because everyone requires previous experience. Ward says he'll speak to his friend, Ted Worden, at the Mayfield Dairy and see if anything is available. Ward is concerned about Eddie doing a good job, though. Wally and Eddie are hired to work at the dairy plant's shipping dock. Eddie shows up in a suit and hopes to play the big shot. After the first day, Eddie thinks they should butter up the loading dock foreman in order to get a better job. The foreman has Wally, and especially Eddie, doing some rather suspicious tasks. Ted tells Ward that there's been some stealing going on at the plant. After finding ice cream in their fridge, Ward talks to Wally. They figure the foreman's been stealing and Ward tells Wally not to accept 'free' ice cream any more. Wally tells Eddie, who just thinks Wally's jealous that he gets along so well with the foreman. Eddie gets caught by Ted as he's about to load ice cream into the foreman's car. Wally and Eddie talk to Ted, who clears them, and the foreman is caught. Guests: Ken Osmond as Eddie Haskell, Howard Caine as Foreman, Don Haggerty as Ted Worden, John Baer as Assistant.
202	7	"Tell It to Ella"	David Butler	Dick Conway & Roland MacLane	November 8, 1962	16162
Beaver comes home from the library at 10 o'clock on a school night. Because his grades have been slipping lately, he is punished by his parents, and is now forbidden to go out on school nights. An angry Beaver complains to Wally that his punishment is unfair and unjust, but Wally is unsympathetic. The next day, Beaver finds out that his friends Mike and Kevin, who were also out with him, didn't get punished. Being grounded also means Beaver can't go to the jalopy races with his two friends. Eddie suggests Beaver write to Ella of the "Tell It to Ella" advice column in the newspaper, saying that Ella usually sides with her young letter writers. Beaver hopes that when Ella sides with him, his parents will have to let him go out on school nights. However, the columnist sides with Beaver's parents, and the parents of Beaver's friends start enforcing the same rules. Beaver confesses to his parents that he wrote the letter and he's sorry he did it. Guests: Ken Osmond as Eddie Haskell, Robert Eyer as Kevin, Tim Matheson as Michael Harmon (as Tim Matthieson).
203	8	"Bachelor at Large"	Hugh Beaumont	Dick Conway & Roland MacLane	November 15, 1962	16163
After a fight with his parents, Eddie moves out of the house and into a room of his own. June hopes Wally doesn't get any ideas of doing the same. Ward tells June that he spoke to Eddie's father and he hopes Eddie will eventually get being alone out of his system. Wally and Beaver are excited that Eddie can do whatever he wants. Eddie tells the guys how he's being waited on by, and having parties with, the young female tenants of the rooming house. Eddie invites Wally and Lumpy over for dinner and then a sleepover. Mr. Haskell calls Ward and asks him to not let Wally go to Eddie's dinner. He feels that Eddie is almost ready to come home and that if Wally and Lumpy show up, they might give Eddie more confidence to be on his own. Wally and Beaver go to Eddie's to tell him they can't come to dinner. Eddie isn't there, but landlady Mrs. Evans shows them Eddie's room. It's a complete mess. She says there are no young girls living here and that Eddie is lonely and eats out of cans. Wally helps Mrs. Evans to get Eddie to return home. Guests: Lurene Tuttle as Mrs. Evans, Ken Osmond as Eddie Haskell, Frank Bank as Clarence Rutherford.
204	9	"Beaver Joins a Record Club"	David Butler	Dick Conway & Roland MacLane	November 22, 1962	16161
To teach Beaver the business of budgeting, Ward gives him an allowance to join a record club and for his other weekly spending. Beaver gets his first package from the record club. Wally reminds him that if he doesn't want to pay for bonus records, he needs to send a card back to the company. But Beaver isn't paying attention. More shipments come and Beaver still hasn't sent any cards back. Beaver gets a bill for $17, more than he has. June tells Ward she's concerned about all the packages Beaver has gotten from the record club. Beaver gets a registered letter from the club demanding payment or legal action will be taken. Beaver tells Ward what happened and Ward comes up with a way for Beaver to get out of his financial problem. Guests: Ken Osmond as Eddie Haskell, Stephen Talbot as Gilbert Bates, George Cisar as The Postman, Robert E. Dugan as Mr. Tyler.
205	10	"Wally's Car Accident"	Hugh Beaumont	Teleplay by : Dick Conway & Roland MacLane; From a Story by: William Gargaro, Jr.	November 29, 1962	16165
Wally wants to ask Ward to borrow his less-than-week-old new car for Friday night so that he can take Shirley Fletcher to the school prom. Before he can ask, Wally learns that Ward and June are going on an overnight trip on Friday with another couple, who will be driving. Wally asks and Ward reluctantly agrees to let him use the car. After the prom, Eddie asks Wally to give Lumpy's car a push because the battery has died. Wally ends up breaking one of the headlights on his dad's car and initially intends to tell his parents about the accident. The next day, Eddie suggests that Wally at least get an estimate on the repair. The mechanic is able to fix the car before Ward and June get home. Due to their involvement in the situation, Lumpy and Eddie contribute towards the $18 cost. Before Wally can tell his father what happened, Ward finds out about the broken headlight, due to a mistaken identity telephone call from Lumpy, and has a talk with Wally. Guests: Ken Osmond as Eddie Haskell, Frank Bank as Clarence Rutherford, Beverly Lunsford as Shirley Fletcher, Will J. White as Al.
206	11	"Beaver, the Sheep Dog"	David Butler	Dick Conway & Roland MacLane	December 6, 1962	16164
Beaver takes it personally when schoolmate Shirley makes fun of his hair and calls him a sheep dog. He goes to the drugstore and buys some hair spray. Wally tells his parents about it. June is concerned, but Ward says that no matter how Beaver looks they shouldn't say anything. He instructs Wally to not react. Beaver comes to dinner with his hair slicked down and Ward and June act nonchalant. However, when Beaver asks them, "Do you notice anything?", Wally hysterically laughs, causing Beaver to run upstairs to his room. Ward has a talk with Beaver, who then washes the product out of his hair. Beaver decides to follow Eddie's advice and give Shirley a taste of her own medicine. At school, Beaver insults Shirley and she starts crying. Beaver feels bad about what he did and writes Shirley a note of apology. Guests: Ken Osmond as Eddie Haskell, Ed Prentiss as Mr. Bailey, Billy Hughes as Chuck, Hank Stanton as Fred, Gretchen Voeth as Shirley, Pamela Duncan as The Woman Clerk, Leslie LaTourette as The 1st Girl, Tina Brady as The 2nd Girl.
207	12	"Beaver, the Hero"	David Butler	Dick Conway & Roland MacLane	December 13, 1962	16166
Perpetual bench-warmer Beaver gets to play in the last few minutes of a football game. He somehow manages to catch the winning touchdown. At home, Beaver downplays the whole thing because he knows he's not that great of a player. At school, a lot of the girls start fawning over Beaver. The local malt shop names a new sundae after him, and the local newspaper prints his photo and writes about his game-winning catch. Beaver starts to enjoy the attention and gets a swelled head about his football abilities. Ward agrees to let Wally talk to him about his attitude. Wally's talk seems to do some good, but then Eddie pumps up Beaver's ego again. Beaver goes as far as cutting practice, feeling he's too good to have to go; but he learns his lesson when the coach suspends him from the team for non-attendance. Guests: Ken Osmond as Eddie Haskell, Stephen Talbot as Gilbert Bates, Stanley Fafara as Whitey Whitney, Wendy Ferdin as Charlene, Carol Feylen as Donna, Leslie LaTourette as Patsy, Kim Charney as Terry, Michael Agate as Denny.
208	13	"Beaver's Autobiography"	David Butler	Joseph Hoffman	December 20, 1962	16156
Beaver finds it difficult to write his autobiography for a school assignment. He can only come up with two of the three pages he needs. New classmate Betsy Carter has a crush on Beaver and he learns that she does really well on compositions. Beaver now hopes he can get her to help him finish his assignment. She agrees to help Beaver. But when Betsy finds out that Beaver has been calling her names behind her back, she decides to write an embarrassing story about him. Betsy turns in the paper before Beaver can read it. Mr. Thompson reads part of Beaver's paper in class and says he would like to talk to him after class. Beaver gets an F on the paper. Ward has Beaver write another autobiography. Not really wanting Beaver to get an F, Betsy confesses to Mr. Thompson that she wrote the paper. Mr. Thompson understands what happened and gives Beaver a C on his second paper. Guests: Annette Gorman as Betsy, Stephen Talbot as Gilbert Bates, Harlan Wade as Mr. Thompson, Terry Burnham as Virginia, Frances Mercer as Mrs. Carter.
209	14	"The Party Spoiler"	Norman Abbott	Dick Conway & Roland MacLane	December 27, 1962	16167
Wally talks Ward and June into letting him have a party, but doesn't invite Beaver. Beaver follows bad advice from Gilbert, who suggests Beaver retaliate by setting up a series of pranks to sabotage the party. Ward and June convince Wally to extend an invitation to Beaver, suggesting he'll probably only hang around long enough for a bite to eat. Wally invites Beaver, who tries unsuccessfully to undo the pranks without getting caught. Initially the guests blame Wally for the pranks, but Beaver confesses. Wally is angry and tells Beaver it was a mistake to invite him. They go the next day not speaking to each other. Beaver finds a way to break the ice and the boys make up. Guests: Ken Osmond as Eddie Haskell, Frank Bank as Clarence Rutherford, Stephen Talbot as Gibert Bates, Vicky Albright as Carolyn, Cheryl Miller as Helen, Robert Reuben Singer as The Boy (as Robert Singer).
210	15	"The Mustache"	Hugh Beaumont	Dick Conway & Roland MacLane	January 3, 1963	16168
Wally is going to his girlfriend Julie Foster's house for an impromptu visit. He's sure she will be home. Wally finds out, along with everyone else, that Julie was out on a date with another boy. The other boy turns out to be Wayne Gregory, a new student at their school. Wally learns that Julie finds Wayne mature and that she thinks Wally is a bit immature in comparison. He believes that it's Wayne's mustache that makes him appear more mature. Wally decides to grow a mustache during school vacation. Everyone at school, including Julie, makes fun of Wally's mustache. Ward tells Wally it's always better to be yourself and not try to be like someone else. Guests: Ken Osmond as Eddie Haskell, Frank Bank as Clarence Rutherford, Cheryl Holdridge as Julie Foster, Robert Koff as Wayne Gregory, Clark Howat as Mr. Barnes, Brenda Fraley as 1st Girl, Karen Lawrence as 2nd Girl.
211	16	"Wally Buys a Car"	David Butler	Story by : Joe Connelly & Bob Mosher; Teleplay by : Wilton Schiller	January 10, 1963	16153
Wally has saved up $180 to buy a car. Wally wants to buy a car from a guy named Frank, but Frank is asking $220 for it. Wally also knows he'll need his parents permission. Ward gives his tentative approval, but he wants to see the car first. Ward also mentions the cost of insurance, which Wally didn't even consider. Wally learns the insurance is almost as expensive as the car itself. Ward says that he'll chip in for the insurance as long as Wally is responsible and keeps up his grades. Ward checks out Frank's car and finds several things wrong with it. They then go to several used car lots and find a more suitable car to purchase. Wally learns a lesson from Ward about the art of buying a used car. Guests: Ken Osmond as Eddie Haskell, Jess Kirkpatrick as Mr. Nelson, Ed Peck as The Salesman, Robert Hyatt as Frank (as Bobby Hyatt), Kathleen O'Malley as The Woman.
212	17	"The Parking Attendants"	Earl Bellamy	Dick Conway & Roland MacLane	January 17, 1963	16169
Wally and Eddie are hired to park cars at the Langley wedding reception. There is no designated parking area and the two boy have to park the cars all over town on the street. Eddie parks Fred and Gwen Rutherford's car in a space in front of a building with a 'private parking, all other cars will be towed' sign he doesn't notice. When Eddie goes back to retrieve the car and discovers it's gone, his solution to the problem is to dump it in Wally's lap. Fred is upset. Wally takes the blame and declines payment from Mr. Langley for his work, and learns another life lesson about responsibility. Guests: Ken Osmond as Eddie Haskell, Frank Bank as Clarence Rutherford, Richard Deacon as Fred Rutherford, Richard Simmons as Ken Langley, Margaret Stewart as Gwen Rutherford, Kim Hamilton as The Maid. Note: Kim Hamilton is the only African-American character in a speaking role that appears in the entire series.
213	18	"More Blessed to Give"	Hugh Beaumont	Dick Conway & Roland MacLane	January 24, 1963	16170
Beaver is infatuated with a girl named Donna Yeager. Wally, Eddie, Beaver, and Gilbert go to a carnival, At the ring toss booth, Beaver attempts to win a $15 fishing reel, but on an errant throw wins a 14K gold double locket necklace that's valued at $20. Scheming Eddie offers to buy it from Beaver for $1, giving Beaver a 75 cent 'profit' on his 25 cent investment, but Wally puts the kibosh on that and suggests he give it to June. While Wally leaves to fetch the car, Eddie tells Beaver not to give it to his mother because doing so would make Ward look like a 'cheapskate'. Eddie ups his offer to $3 and Beaver is tempted, but Gilbert intervenes and suggests Beaver give it to Donna, which he does after putting pictures of each of them inside it. Donna's angry father, Bob Yeager, won't let her keep the expensive gift, much to her dismay. Bob mails the locket, insured, back to Beaver without a note of explanation. June finds the locket in Beaver's dresser drawer and thinks Donna gave the gift to Beaver. Ward says he'll talk with Bob and return the locket. Ward then learns the truth about the situation from Bob. Beaver and Ward share a conversation about girls and the feeling of love. Beaver gives the locket to June. Guests: Ken Osmond as Eddie Haskell, Stephen Talbot as Gilbert Bates, Paul Langton as Bob Yeager, Chrystine Jordan as Donna Yeager (as Chrystie Jordan), Ann Staunton as Mildred Yeager, Buddy Lewis as The Pitchman, Ben Bryant as The Assistant, George Cisar as The Postman.
214	19	"Beaver's Good Deed"	David Butler	Dick Conway & Roland MacLane	January 31, 1963	16171
Beaver backs out of a babysitting job and Ward tells him he should have kept his word. Ward tells him he should not be so inconsiderate and selfish, and should be nice to people. Ward and June leave for a lunch date at the club. A hungry hobo with a hard luck story knocks on the Cleavers' kitchen door. Wanting to be nice, Beaver gives the man something to eat. Beaver learns his name is Jeff and he used to work for a circus. Jeff talks Beaver into letting him wash up a bit and winds up taking a bath. Wally comes home and finds out that Jeff is in the bathtub. After a while they check on Jeff and see that he's gone. They also see Jeff's old clothes and discover one of Ward's good suits is missing. The boys decide to search the neighborhood for Jeff. Ward and June come home and find Jeff's old clothes and a thank-you note from him. Beaver explains to Ward what happened. Ward receives a letter in the mail from Jeff. Jeff apologizes for taking Ward's suit. Jeff says he got a job because of the suit and will send money to pay for it. Guests: Stephen Talbot as Gilbert Bates, Frank Ferguson as Jeff.
215	20	"The Credit Card"	David Butler	Dick Conway & Roland MacLane	February 7, 1963	16172
Eddie's father, George, signs for Eddie's new credit card. When Wally's car breaks down, Eddie uses the credit card to get it repaired with a new battery. Wally later gives Eddie cash for the bill, but Eddie spends it on himself. Eddie's father receives the credit card bill and after calling the service station, finds out the battery went into Wally's car. George calls Ward thinking that Wally didn't repay the bill. Wally confronts Eddie and says he'll tell George that Eddie spent the money. Wally then agrees to give Eddie until that evening to come up with the money. Eddie comes up with a plan that winds up getting him even further in debt. Eddie eventually comes clean, loses the credit card privileges, and is grounded for a month. Guests: Ken Osmond as Eddie Haskell, Frank Bank as Clarence Rutherford, George Petrie as George Haskell, Anne Barton as Agnes Haskell, Harp McGuire as The Attendant.
216	21	"Beaver the Caddy"	Earl Bellamy	Dick Conway & Roland MacLane	February 14, 1963	16176
At the golf club, Beaver is caddying for Ken Langley and Gilbert is caddying for Art Howard. Beaver is keeping score. He soon realizes that Langley is not giving him the correct score and is shaving a stroke here and there. Langley winds up beating Art and he gives Beaver a large tip. Feeling bad, Beaver tells Gilbert that Langley cheated. Beaver later finds out from Ward that Langley and Howard had a $500 bet on their game. Beaver tells Wally what happened and asks if he should tell someone. Beaver goes to Langley's office and confronts him about the cheating. Langley tries to justify what he did, but Beaver still thinks what he did was wrong. Langley comes up with a plan to make things right. Guests: Dick Simmons as Kenneth Langley (as Richard Simmons), Stephen Talbot as Gilbert Bates, John Gallaudet as Arthur Howard, Ralph Montgomery as The Caddy Master, Dorothy Abbott as The Secretary.
217	22	"Beaver on TV"	David Butler	Dick Conway & Roland MacLane	February 21, 1963	16174
Beaver is chosen to appear as a panelist on the popular TV show "Teen Age Forum". Beaver's classmates and family plan to watch him "live" on the show. Before the show is to start, Beaver asks if he could go and get a drink of water. While he's gone, he misses the announcement that his episode will be taped for airing the following week. Everyone is surprised and disappointed when they don't see Beaver on the show. When his friends at school ask Beaver why he lied about being on the show, he doesn't return to class. June calls Ward and he says he found out the show was taped. She says she's worried as Beaver didn't go back to class. Beaver calls the station to ask if he was on the show and after misunderstanding what they say, Beaver starts to believe he wasn't actually there. Beaver finally comes home and Ward explains to him that the show will be on next week. Beaver says it's hard when one tells the truth and no one believes you. The following week, everyone enjoys Beaver's appearance on television. Guests: Stephen Talbot as Gilbert Bates, Richard Deacon as Fred Rutherford, Doris Packer as Mrs. Cornelia Rayburn, Jack Smith as the Director, Johnny Jacobs as Mr. Thornton (as John Jacobs), Marian Collier as The Girl In The TV Station, Kevin Jones as The 1st Boy, Brad Berwick as The 2nd Boy, Carol Faylen as The 1st Girl, Patty Ann Gerrity as The 2nd Girl (as Patty Gerrity), Barbara Hunter as Janet Lynch (as Barbara Jean Hunter), Larry Adare as Phillip Jones.
218	23	"Box Office Attraction"	David Butler	Dick Conway & Roland MacLane and Joe Connelly & Bob Mosher	February 28, 1963	16175
Wally is attracted to Marlene Holmes, the ticket taker at the local movie theater. With Eddie's encouragement, Wally finally asks her out. Beaver happens to see Marlene smoking and drinking beer with another guy in a tavern. June, not knowing what Beaver saw, asks Wally to invite Marlene over for dinner so she can meet her. At dinner, Marlene is very sweet and polite, but June is still unsure about her. On the drive to the date, Marlene admits to Wally that she just put on an act so his parents would like her. Beaver tells his parents about Marlene smoking and drinking. Marlene takes Wally to the bar, orders a couple beers, and tells him how she dropped out of school. She then dances with a guy named Gus. Both Marlene and Wally realize that things are not going to work out between them. Guests: Stephen Talbot as Gilbert Bates, Ken Osmond as Eddie Haskell, Diane Sayer as Marlene Holmes, Dennis Richards as Gus, A. G. Vitanza as Hank.
219	24	"Lumpy's Scholarship"	Hugh Beaumont	Dick Conway & Roland MacLane	March 7, 1963	16177
Wally is disappointed he didn't get the college athletic scholarship he wanted, but he throws a party for Lumpy, who got it instead. Lumpy is getting congratulations from many of the students at school, even some girls. While at the party, Lumpy learns that he is losing the scholarship because of a poor grade, much to the chagrin of his father. Lumpy doesn't say anything to the people at the party. Fred later tells Ward what happened and Lumpy tells Wally. Ward feels sympathy for Lumpy and secretly convinces the college to reinstate the scholarship, provided Lumpy improves his grade. Fred calls Ward and brags about how the school is giving Lumpy a second chance. Ward doesn't reveal to Fred how that second chance came about. Guests: Frank Bank as Clarence Rutherford, Ken Osmond as Eddie Haskell, Richard Deacon as Fred Rutherford, Ahna Capri as Cinda Dunsworth (as Anna Capri), Dana Dillaway as Sally, Nino Candido as Buzz, Dennis Pepper as Denny.
220	25	"The Silent Treatment"	David Butler	Theodore and Mathilde Ferro	March 14, 1963	16178
Beaver is about to help Wally and Eddie put in a new radio into Eddie's car. June stops him and tells him to go to the store, which he promised to do earlier. Beaver is mad and decides to give June the cold shoulder. At the same time, he is especially nice to Ward. June senses right away that there is something wrong. Wally tells Beaver that he knows what Beaver is up to and that he should get over it. Ward tells June that he will have a talk with Beaver about his behavior. June asks Ward not to because it will just make him resent her even more. In the end, Beaver being stung by a bee brings him and June close together again. Guests: Ken Osmond as Eddie Haskell.
221	26	"Uncle Billy's Visit"	David Butler	Dick Conway & Roland MacLane and Joe Connelly & Bob Mosher	March 21, 1963	16173
Ward and June have plans to go away for the weekend but have no one to watch Wally and Beaver. Uncle Billy calls, announcing that he's in town, and would like to come visit, and he volunteers to stay with the boys, which Ward and June, albeit some reluctance on June's part, accept. Billy's more relaxed than Ward and June and lets the boys do pretty much what they want. Beaver is caught trying to sneak his friend Gilbert through the back door of the movie theater. When Uncle Billy finds out, Beaver learns the hard way that there are some things even his fun-loving uncle won't tolerate, and being taken advantage of is one of them. In the end, the two make up, and Uncle Billy doesn't tell either June or Ward about it. Guests: Stephen Talbot as Gilbert Bates, Kevin Jones as Alan, William Woodson as Mr. Gaines, Martin Dean as The Usher, Edgar Buchanan as Uncle Billy Cleaver.
222	27	"Beaver's Prep School"	Hugh Beaumont	Dick Conway & Roland MacLane and Joe Connelly & Bob Mosher	March 28, 1963	16180
Ward and June learn that Aunt Martha is coming for a visit and that she wants to send Beaver to Fallbrook for high school. It's one of the best prep schools in the country and located in New England. Beaver looks over a brochure describing all the additional things that can be done at the school such as horseback riding and shooting. To Ward and June's surprise, Beaver is eager to accept the offer. Even though she is due to arrive soon, Beaver lets her know by phone how excited he is. But at school, Beaver starts to realize all the things he will be missing by going. Beaver tells Ward that he doesn't want to go to Fallbrook. Ward expects Beaver to find a way to tell Aunt Martha. When she arrives, Beaver just sits her down and tells her he changed his mind. She understands and says she doesn't want Beaver to do anything that will make him unhappy. Guests: Madge Kennedy as Aunt Martha Bronson, Doris Packer as Mrs. Cornelia Rayburn, Stanley Fafara as Whitey Whitney, Kim Charney as Terry, Patty Ann Gerrity as 1st Girl (as Patty Gerrity), Carol Faylen as 2nd Girl, Larry Adare as Alan, Henry Hunter as Mr. Thomas.
223	28	"Wally and the Fraternity"	David Butler	Dick Conway & Roland MacLane	April 4, 1963	16181
Wally decides to go to his father's alma mater, State College. He and Eddie wish to join their top fraternity, Alpha Kappa, as Ward did when he went to State. College student Chuck Bradford tells them that the Alpha Kappa fraternity is terrible ("a pig outfit"), making Eddie want to back out. Even Wally is having his doubts. However, Ward has already sent a letter of recommendation for both of them. Wally tells Beaver what Chuck said about the fraternity, Beaver then tells June, and June then mentions it to Ward. Eddie lets Wally know that he wrote a letter to Alpha Kappa telling them he is not interested. Then Wally and Eddie see Ted, a star athlete at State, who has dropped by Mayfield High to see how things are going. As a member of Alpha Kappa, he tells them it is outstanding, and that Chuck has been denouncing it because he was kicked out for bad behavior. Wally and a contrite Eddie tell Ward about Eddie's letter and Ward says that he'll see what he can do. Guests: Ken Osmond as Eddie Haskell, Don Voyne as Ted, Jeff Malloy as Chuck Bradford (as Jeff Parker), Randy Herron as Barry.
224	29	"Eddie's Sweater"	Earl Bellamy	Story by : Kenneth Enochs; Teleplay by : Joe Connelly & Bob Mosher	April 11, 1963	16179
The family notices that Wally has been spending a lot time at Eddie's girlfriend Cindy Andrews' house. Wally is dating Julie Foster, so they hope that whatever Wally is doing with Cindy is perfectly innocent. It is; Wally is acting as a fitting model for a sweater that Cindy is knitting for Eddie as a birthday present, and is keeping the situation secret. Lumpy overhears Wally and Cindy setting up another date. Julie calls the house and Beaver inadvertently tells her that Wally is at Cindy's. This upsets Julie, who hangs up on him. Eddie and Lumpy catch Wally going into Cindy's house that evening. Later, Wally tells an inquisitive Ward why he's been going to Cindy's. At school the next day, Julie brushes off Wally, calling him a 'Casanova'. Then Eddie confronts Wally and slugs him in the jaw, but Wally still won't reveal the surprise. That evening, Cindy gives Eddie the sweater (a week before his birthday) because of his confrontation at school, and explains everything to him. Eddie apologies to Wally, and Wally makes up with Julie. Guests: Ken Osmond as Eddie Haskell, Frank Bank as Clarence Rutherford, Cheryl Holdridge as Julie Foster, Anna Capri as Cindy Andrews (as Anna Capri).
225	30	"The Book Report"	Hugh Beaumont	Dick Conway & Roland MacLane	April 18, 1963	16182
Beaver procrastinates with his book report on The Three Musketeers, leaving it until the weekend before it's due. Despite his efforts to read the book, Beaver makes little progress, as it is long and difficult. At Gilbert's suggestion, he finds himself watching a Ritz Brothers musical farce of The Three Musketeers on TV and he presents the humorous details of what he saw in his report. However, the musical wasn't the same as the book, so Mrs. Rayburn isn't fooled by Beaver's report. After class, she lectures him on how his attempt to cheat was far worse than simply admitting the book was too difficult for him, and she assigns him two additional book reports to complete to teach him a lesson. Guests: Stephen Talbot as Gilbert Bates, Doris Packer as Mrs. Cornelia Rayburn, Carol Faylen as Janet, Fletcher Alan as The Man.
226	31	"The Poor Loser"	David Butler	Dick Conway & Roland MacLane	April 25, 1963	16183
Ward receives two tickets to a baseball game and must choose one of his sons to take with him. He chooses Wally because Beaver already has other plans for the night, but then Beaver's plans fall through. Beaver hopes that Ward can get an extra ticket, but the game is sold out. Gilbert tries to convince Beaver that the older sibling is always the favorite. Beaver eventually manipulates Wally into surrendering his ticket, but he can't enjoy the game with his dad because of the guilt he feels. When Beaver gets home, he gives Wally a foul ball he caught at the game. Guests: Stephen Talbot as Gilbert Bates, Vince Williams as The Radio Announcer (voice).
227	32	"Don Juan Beaver"	Hugh Beaumont	Teleplay by : Joe Connelly & Bob Mosher; From a Story by: David Levinson	May 2, 1963	16185
Peggy MacIntosh calls Beaver and asks him to take her to eighth grade graduation dance. He doesn't commit one way or the other. June insists that he accept Peggy's invitation, which he does the next day. Beaver then meets a new student, southern belle Melinda Neilson, who calls him that evening and asks him to take her to the dance. Beaver tells her he'll let her know in school. Despite wanting to go with Melinda, Beaver's parents insist he go with Peggy. Taking advice from Eddie, Beaver tries to do things to make Peggy not want to go to the dance with him. Peggy finds out about Melinda and tells Beaver to go with her. His parents again tell Beaver he made the date with Peggy first and to go with her. Both girls wind up rejecting him, leaving him with no date for the dance. Guests: Stephen Talbot as Gilbert Bates, Ken Osmond as Eddie Haskell, Stanley Fafara as Whitey Whitney, Veronica Cartwright as Peggy MacIntosh, Charla Doherty as Melinda Neilson.
228	33	"Summer in Alaska"	David Butler	Dick Conway & Roland MacLane	May 9, 1963	16184
Eddie's uncle gets him a summer job on a fishing boat in Alaska. Eddie tells Wally and Lumpy that if they're interested, he'll put in a good word with his uncle. Ward lets Wally know that taking the job in Alaska is out of the question. Lumpy's parents won't let him go either. Wally and Lumpy now believe that Eddie is just making up the job. Eddie tells them to come along on the interview with the ship's captain, who informs Eddie how hard the job is going to be. Eddie is now afraid to tell his dad that he doesn't want to go, especially after his prior enthusiasm. Wally has a talk with Mr. Haskell and they come up with a way to have Eddie not feel bad about finally declining the job offer. Guests: Ken Osmond as Eddie Haskell, Frank Bank as Clarence Rutherford, George Petrie as George Haskell, Anne Barton as Agnes Haskell, Harry Harvey as Captain Drake (as Harry Harvey Sr.).
229	34	"Beaver's Graduation"	Hugh Beaumont	Dick Conway & Roland MacLane	May 16, 1963	16186
With days to go before graduation, Gilbert talks Beaver into skipping English class and slacking off. Wally tells Beaver that he shouldn't assume his graduating is guaranteed. His parents say that Beaver should do his best, even in these last few days. Beaver and Gilbert are delivering a note to Mrs. Rayburn's office and there is no one else there. They see diplomas sitting on her desk and decide to look through them. Beaver notices that there is no diploma for him and believes it is because of his recent behavior. He eventually tells his parents and they suggest he talk to Mrs. Rayburn to see what happened. Mrs. Rayburn explains to Beaver that his diploma wasn't with the others because several diplomas, for the students who will be on the stage, were set aside. Guests: Stephen Talbot as Gilbert Bates, Ken Osmond as Eddie Haskell, Doris Packer as Mrs. Cornelia Rayburn, Dorothy Abbott as Miss Walker.
230	35	"Wally's Practical Joke"	David Butler	Joe Connelly & Bob Mosher	May 23, 1963	16187
As a joke, Lumpy puts exploding smoke bombs under the hoods of Wally's and Eddie's cars. Eddie convinces Wally that they should play a practical joke on Lumpy. They decide to chain the rear of Lumpy's car to a tree. But the joke goes wrong when, instead of stopping the car from going anywhere, the rear axle of the car breaks off. And to make matters worse, Fred Rutherford finds the Cleaver name written on the chain. Fred tells Ward what happened and Ward speaks to Wally. Wally can try and fix the car or he will have to pay for the repairs. Wally and Eddie do manage to repair Lumpy's car and learn that practical jokes aren't worth it. Guests: Ken Osmond as Eddie Haskell, Frank Bank as Clarence Rutherford, Richard Deacon as Fred Rutherford, Kathleen O'Malley as Mrs. Halloran. Final appearance in the series of Fred Rutherford.
231	36	"The All-Night Party"	David Butler	Dick Conway & Roland MacLane	May 30, 1963	16188
Wally wants to attend an all-night high-school graduation party at the country club. At first Ward and June are reluctant, but then decide he can go. Wally would like to take new girl Kathy Gregory as his date. Kathy tells Wally that her dad won't let her go because he doesn't know enough about Wally. She would like Wally to come over and try to make a good impression on her father. After meeting Wally, Mr. Gregory lets Kathy go to the party. While the party goes off without issue, just as Wally and Kathy are leaving the party, a passing drunk bumps into Kathy and knocks her into a fountain. Mr. Gregory is furious when Kathy comes home soaking wet and grounds her for a month. Wally has a talk with Mr. Gregory and straightens things out. Guests: Ken Osmond as Eddie Haskell, Frank Bank as Clarence Rutherford, Marjorie Reynolds as Mildred Gregory, Patricia Morrow as The 1st Girl (as Pat Morrow), Judy Short as Sue (as Judie Short), Frank Sully as The Drunk, Mary Benoit as The 1st Woman, Carole Wells as Kathy Gregory, Herbert Rudley as Roger Gregory. Final appearance in the series of Lumpy.
232	37	"Beaver Sees America"	Hugh Beaumont	Story by : Katherine & Dale Eunson; Teleplay by : Katherine & Dale Eunson and Joe Connelly & Bob Mosher	June 6, 1963	16189
Ward and June would like to send Beaver on a six-week bus tour around the country. Beaver is more than excited to go. Beaver goes to tell Mary Margaret Matthews, a girl he really likes, about the trip. Despite her age, Mary Margaret knows how to use her feminine charms. She wonders what she will do while Beaver is away. While Beaver's with Mary Margaret, Gilbert stops by and mentions how he'll be around all summer. A jealous Beaver now pictures Mary Margaret and Gilbert spending six weeks together. Wally tells Ward and June that Beaver wants to stay home because of Mary Margaret. Ward finds a way to get Beaver to want to go on the trip again. Beaver and Gilbert find out what a manipulative girl Mary Margaret really is. Guests: Ken Osmond as Eddie Haskell, Stephen Talbot as Gilbert Bates, Stanley Fafara as Whitey Whitney, Lori Martin as Mary Margaret Matthews. Final appearance in the series for Whitey, Gilbert, and Eddie. Whitey had appeared in the first episode of the series telecast.
233	38	"The Clothing Drive"	Charles Haas	Allan Manings	June 13, 1963	16155
Beaver hopes to win the school's good citizen award. The winner receives a plaque and will get their picture in the newspaper. In order to win, one has to bring in the most clothes for the school's clothing drive. June packs a box full of clothes for Beaver to take. Three of Ward's good suits that he had set aside to be taken to the cleaners end up falling next to the donation box. Beaver assumes the suits are part of the donation. Partly because of the three suits, Beaver ends up winning the citizenship award. June sends Ward to Mrs. Rayburn's office to try and get his suits back. Beaver winds up sharing the award with two other students. Guests: Doris Packer as Mrs. Cornelia Rayburn, Ed Prentiss as Mr. Bailey, Tim Matheson as Michael Harmon (as Tim Matthieson), John Yount as Chuck (as Johnny Yount). Final appearance in the series of Mrs. Rayburn. She had appeared in the very first episode telecast. This episode, despite being the penultimate one telecast, was actually produced much earlier in the season. This explains the anomaly of the plot centering on Beaver's classroom activities, even though a recent episode had indicated he had graduated, and the one immediately previous showed him preparing for a 6-week summer trip across America.
234	39	"Family Scrapbook"	Hugh Beaumont	Joe Connelly & Bob Mosher	June 20, 1963	16190
While cleaning the house, June finds some family memorabilia which no one has seen in years, including a scrapbook of photographs. Ward and June want the entire family to look through the scrapbook together. While looking at the photographs, Beaver learns how he came to be called Beaver. In a series of flashbacks, the family reminisces about the many things they have gone through. Afterwards, June and Ward talk about how much the boys have grown up, but that they will always be kids at heart. Guests: Ken Osmond as Eddie Haskell (archive footage), Sue Randall as Miss Alice Landers (archive footage), Madge Blake as Mrs. Margaret Mondello (archive footage), Pamela Baird as Mary Ellen Rogers (archive footage) (as Pamela Beaird), Robert "Rusty" Stevens as Larry Mondello (archive footage) (as Rusty Stevens).
