= Family Scrapbook =

- Leave It to Beaver episode
- Episode no.: Season 6 Episode 39
- Directed by: Hugh Beaumont
- Written by: Joe Connelly; Bob Mosher
- Production code: 16190
- Original air date: June 20, 1963

Guest appearances
- Pamela Baird as Mary Ellen Rogers; Madge Blake as Mrs Margaret Mondello; Ken Osmond as Eddie Haskell; Sue Randall as Miss Alice Landers; Rusty Stevens as Larry Mondello; (All guest stars seen in "flashbacks")

Episode chronology
← Previous "The Clothing Drive"	Next → —

"Family Scrapbook" is the series finale of the American television series Leave It to Beaver. It is the 39th episode of the sixth season, and the 234th episode overall. Written by Joe Connelly and Bob Mosher and directed by series star Hugh Beaumont, the episode originally aired on ABC on June 20, 1963.

== Plot summary ==
The episode begins with June finding an old family scrapbook while housecleaning. She gathers the family together in the living room to glance through the book. Brief highlights from the series are replayed as the Cleavers reminisce over old photographs (which are stills from earlier episodes). Ken Osmond as Eddie Haskell, Rusty Stevens as Larry Mondello, Madge Blake as Mrs. Mondello, Pamela Baird as Mary Ellen Rogers, and Sue Randall as Miss Landers are seen in flashbacks from several episodes including "Beaver Gets 'Spelled", "New Neighbors", "My Brother's Girl", "The Shave", "Beaver Runs Away", "Larry Hides Out", "Teacher Comes to Dinner", and "Wally's Election". The episode ends with the teenaged Cleaver boys playing with a wind-up toy and laughing like children. In this final episode, the viewer learns how Beaver got his nickname.

== Cast and crew ==
"Family Scrapbook" stars Hugh Beaumont and Barbara Billingsley as archetypal suburban couple, Ward and June Cleaver. Along for the ride are Tony Dow as the couple's older son, Wally Cleaver, and Jerry Mathers as their younger son, Theodore "Beaver" Cleaver. All guest stars in the episode appear in clips from previous episodes in the series. The episode was written by the show's creators, Joe Connelly and Bob Mosher, with series star, Hugh Beaumont directing.

== Significance ==
"Family Scrapbook" has claimed its place in television history as the first traditional primetime series finale. No other series prior to Leave It to Beaver had a special final episode except Howdy Doody in 1960 (which did not use flashbacks and was not a primetime sitcom). Most series ended with a general storyline episode, not unlike any other episode in the series.

== See also ==
- List of Leave It to Beaver episodes
