= Leave It to Beaver season 5 =

Leave It to Beaver
- Season 5
- No. of episodes: 39

Release
- Original network: ABC
- Original release: September 30, 1961 – June 30, 1962

Season chronology
- ← Previous; Season 4 Next → Season 6

The fifth season of the American television series Leave It to Beaver aired from September 30, 1961 to June 30, 1962 on ABC. It consisted of 39 black-and-white episodes, each running approximately 25 minutes.

== Production ==
The fifth season of Leave It to Beaver debuted on ABC September 30, 1961 with "Wally Goes Steady" and aired its last episode, "Un-togetherness" with Brenda Scott as Lori Ann, June 30, 1962. Like the previous four seasons, the fifth season consists of 39 black-and-white, full-screen, half-hour episodes (with ads) shot on 35mm film.

== Opening and closing sequences ==
The opening sequence, as in the fourth season, shows the front entrance of the house at 211 Pine St. This time, when the door opens, June appears carrying a tray that holds a full, chilled pitcher and four glasses, as the announcer intones, "starring Barbara Billingsley". June turns to her right and beckons to Ward, whom we see pruning shrubbery with hedge clippers, then to her left, where Wally looks up from his lawn mower near some shrubbery, then toward the walkway, where Beaver looks up happily from mowing, all as the stars are announced. After an introductory scene, some credits for writing and directing are given. The closing sequence is similar to that of the third and fourth seasons, except that guest star credits link the actors to their roles.

== Casting ==
All four cast members appear in every episode. This season marks the last appearance of Burt Mustin as Gus the fireman and Sue Randall as Ms. Landers.

== Direction and Writing ==
Norman Abbott directs most of the episodes of the season with Hugh Beaumont directing some episodes too.

== Leave it to Beaver Universe ==
In this season, Beaver is in sixth grade at Grant Ave. Grammar School and Wally is in twelfth grade at Mayfield High. This is the first season where Beaver has a deep voice and is somewhat awkward.

== Episodes ==
No. overall	No. in season	Title	Directed by	Written by	Original release date	Prod. code
157	1	"Wally Goes Steady"	Norman Abbott	Story by : Dick Conway & Roland MacLane; Teleplay by : Joe Connelly & Bob Mosher	September 30, 1961	16108
At the country club, Ward is greeted like a future in-law by the father of Evelyn, a girl Wally is dating. Later, at the dinner table, Ward and June inquire about Evelyn, and Wally admits to having a couple of dates with her, but has little else to say about it. When Wally plays tennis with Evelyn and her older sister Judy and her husband, who dropped out of junior college to get married, the Cleavers really start to worry. However, during a night at the Hendersons, Wally sees that their home life is far from glamorous, as Judy struggles with housekeeping, several furniture items need repair, and her husband struggles with a difficult job that doesn't pay enough to make ends meet. In addition the couple rely on financial help from Judy's parents, and they bicker over these issues. Wally ultimately realizes that marriage is "nothing to mess with". Later, at the club, after Wally has stopped "going steady" with Evelyn, Ward overhears Evelyn's father introduce himself to someone else as a prospective relative. After Evelyn's father leaves, Ward tells the man to let his son accept any invitation to visit the Hendersons. Guests: Mary Mitchel as Evelyn Boothby, Gloria Gilbert as Judy Henderson, Ryan O'Neal as Tom Henderson, Pat McCaffrie as Bill Boothby, Frederick DeWilde as Jack Bennett (as Frederic deWilde; father of Brandon deWilde). At the Hendersons, Wally tries to make conversation by wondering if Roger Maris or Mickey Mantle will hit 60 home runs in the current baseball season.
158	2	"No Time for Babysitters"	David Butler	Dick Conway & Roland MacLane	October 7, 1961	16107
Ward and June have been invited to the McBride's wedding anniversary on Friday, and Wally is taking Susan to a dance at the lake. Even Lumpy has a date. Who will watch Beaver? Beaver thinks that he's too old for babysitters and his parents are loath to tell him otherwise. When Gilbert and Richard show up and tell Beaver his family treats him like a baby, Beaver says, Oh yeah?, he's staying at home by himself on Friday. This they have to see. So, when Beaver is told that there will be a sitter, he's very unhappy. Gilbert and Richard come by and tell Beaver they are definitely checking on him later to see if there's a baby sitter. However, this sitter is Judy, whom Wally can't take his eyes off of, with a voice like a kitten's purr, and the good sense to disappear when Gilbert and Richard come calling. It's enough to make Beaver wish he were a baby again. Guests: Barbara Parkins as Judy Walker, Richard Correll as Richard Rickover, Stephen Talbot as Gilbert Bates.
159	3	"Wally's Car"	David Butler	Dick Conway & Roland MacLane	October 14, 1961	16103
Ward has just come back from playing 27 holes of golf and June is in the kitchen paring vegetables. Then come crashing sounds as Lumpy's car pushes Wally's newly purchased, non-running 1936 Ford coupe up the driveway. Ward and June are stunned that Wally, who does not have a driver's license, would make such a purchase without consulting them. Ward explains to Wally all the added costs having a car entails: $200 for annual insurance, a registration fee, and gas and oil. The car is blocking the driveway and can't be pushed, so Ward and June have take a cab to a dinner date, while Wally calls Lumpy to bring "the guys" and tools. The car is disassembled enough to be pushed out of the way, but Ward and June are shocked to return near midnight to find Wally and Beaver still working on it. Wally can't keep the car, but can he recoup his $25 investment? While Wally sells off car parts, Ward calls a junk dealer who'll pay $15 for such a car with all the parts. When the dealer arrives with his tow truck, to find the car picked over like "a boned fish", Wally is able to pay him $10 to haul it away, and still have $2.50 profit from selling the parts. Guests: Ken Osmond as Eddie Haskell, Frank Bank as Clarence Rutherford, Ralph Sanford as Mr. Garvey, George Spicer as Ray, Dick Foster as Don, Audrey Swanson as Mrs. Ashby.
160	4	"Beaver's Birthday"	Hugh Beaumont	Story by : Bob Ross; Teleplay by : Dick Conway & Roland MacLane	October 21, 1961	16110
Beaver decides he's too old for birthday parties. But he still wants presents and there's a model car he's been wanting. Thinking he may be getting too big for toys, Ward and June give Beaver $10. He also receives money from some of his relatives. Ward and June convince Beaver to bank his birthday money instead of buying a bunch of stuff. But when Uncle Billy's ten dollar cash gift arrives in the mail later in the day, Gilbert urges Beaver to keep the money a secret and use it to buy the car. Beaver is reluctant to do it without telling his parents first, but winds up buying the car. Taking Gilbert's suggestion, Beaver lies and tells Ward that Gilbert gave him the car. June finds a thank you note that Beaver wrote to Uncle Billy. Ward speaks to Beaver about him lying about the car. Beaver apologizes and says he will tell Gilbert that his plan didn't work while Beaver sits on him. Guests: Stephen Talbot as Gilbert Bates, William Newell as The Postal Clerk.
161	5	"Beaver's Cat Problem"	David Butler	Joe Connelly & Bob Mosher	November 4, 1961	16112
Beaver finds a cat outside on the porch when he comes home and takes it up to his room. Ward wonders why the boys are so quiet upstairs. Mrs. Prentiss calls June and asks her if she has seen her lost cat Bootsie. Ward puts two and two together and figures that Beaver has the cat. Beaver feeds the cat. A grateful Mrs. Prentiss picks up Bootsie. Bootsie comes back in the middle of the night looking for food. Beaver feeds the cat hoping to keep it quiet till morning. Beaver takes Bootsie back to Mrs. Prentiss. But by the time he gets home, Bootsie is back yet again. Beaver suggests borrowing Gilbert's dog Archie in hopes of scaring Bootsie away. The plan works and Beaver gives Archie a treat. However, now Archie shows up that evening looking for food. Guests: Stephen Talbot as Gilbert Bates, Grace Wallis Huddle as Mrs. Prentiss.
162	6	"Wally's Weekend Job"	Norman Abbott	Dick Conway & Roland MacLane	November 11, 1961	16102
Eddie stops by from the library, where he has been writing an essay on Aristotle, with plans to go to M.I.T. But Wally may have a weekend job. "Sam" has managed to make Eddie look bad again. June knows her polite, conscientious son will get the job, as he does, and all the free ice cream he can eat, which makes any new worker too sick to want it. Beaver thinks that means he and his friends will be treated. Meanwhile, the girls, all the girls, show up at the shop; and there is nothing behind that counter they want more than Wally. Eddie and Lumpy arrive and feel slighted. Beaver and his friends come to the shop. When they cannot pay for their 25-cent sodas, Wally thinks of calling the cops but lets them go with a warning. Later that evening, Eddie and Lumpy pose as Mary Ellen's father, and phone to have Wally deliver ice cream to her slumber party, where boys are forbidden. After being chased from the premises by a furious dad, Wally seeks out his friends at their homes and dumps some now melted pistachio on Lumpy, and a carton of vanilla down the front of Eddie. Ward understands, but is concerned by, Wally's loss of temper. The fact that Wally himself has a "creepy felling" about it is a good sign. Guests: Ken Osmond as Eddie Haskell, Frank Bank as Clarence Rutherford, Cheryl Holdridge as Julie Foster, Richard Correll as Richard Rickover, Stephen Talbot as Gilbert Bates, Pamela Baird as Mary Ellen Rogers (as Pamela Beaird), Tim Graham as Mr. Gibson, Bill Baldwin as Mr. Rogers, Donna Conn as Jan, Rita Norma Somers as Ann.
163	7	"Beaver Takes a Drive"	Charles Haas	Dick Conway & Roland MacLane	November 18, 1961	16111
Ward and June are found snacking on cream cheese and crackers—to forestall hunger pangs at the housewarming at the Burke's, whose lunches are invariably late. The boys ask for rides to the park and Gilbert's, nearby destinations. Ward and June are being picked up by the Tolans. Ward suggests the boys walk, as he would have been expected to do when he was younger. Wally thinks that was because it was harder to hitch up the horse and wagon. Wally goes to the park and Gilbert comes over. With everyone else gone, Beaver and Gilbert sit in the car and pretend to take a trip, until Beaver releases the emergency brake, and the car rolls into the street, blocking all traffic. Gilbert flees and meets Wally. Wally hurries home, finds the spare key, and heroically drives the car out of the way. Then the police arrive and cite Wally for driving without a license. Beaver needs to explain how the car got out into the street. Wally and Beaver meet Ward at traffic court. Their story to the judge is too complicated, but they do make the point that it's hard to ask an adult for help when all the adults are yelling. The Judge gives Wally gets a warning. Beaver says he will sit in a box the next time he wants to pretend to drive. And, no, Wally doesn't want to see the judge again, either. Guests: Stephen Talbot as Gilbert Bates, Frank Bank as Clarence Rutherford, Maurice Manson as Judge Morton, Gail Bonney as the Woman Clerk, Stephen Courtleigh as the Father, Brad Morrow as the Boy, Dick Foster as Barry, Stuffy Singer as Steve, Bill Hale as the Officer, George Hickman as 1st Man, Bob Golden as 2nd Man, Lillian O'Malley as the Woman.
164	8	"Wally's Big Date"	David Butler	Story by : Kenneth A. Enochs; Teleplay by : Bob Ross	November 25, 1961	16106
The 16th is the day of the drawing for the Mayfield-Riverside High exchange dance. It was idea of Mrs. Mulligan, the social studies teacher, to choose dates by lot, to teach good citizenship. Eddie coyly offers to trade the date he drew, Gail Preston, for Wally's Marjorie Muller, claiming he and Marjorie have hit it off. By her picture in the Riverside yearbook Eddie has brought, Gail is a knockout; but when Wally goes to the malt shop to meet her, she turns out to be "nine feet tall", which Eddie knew. Wally finds Eddie trying to retrieve the yearbook and really is about to clobber him, when June comes in. At the dance, Gail has her hair down and has worn flats, and she's no taller than Wally. They have a great time until Wally brushes off Beaver's phoned reports of parental illness, but she easily understands why Beaver was only trying to give Wally an excuse to leave. At home, June remembers wearing her hair down and flats for a shorter boy. Not knowing that's what Gail did, Ward says today's teens are too sophisticated to be that kind. Guests: Ken Osmond as Eddie Haskell, Frank Bank as Clarence Rutherford, Laraine Stephens as Gail Preston, Judee Morton as Marjorie Muller.
165	9	"Beaver's Ice Skates"	Hugh Beaumont	Joseph Hoffman	December 2, 1961	16114
Beaver wants $6 to buy a season ticket to the ice rink. Ward worries that further expenses will result as things get out of hand. June says that's certainly possible, especially seeing the way Ward's current golf habit has grown from a single 5-iron. Sure enough, Beaver soon wants some skates, on sale at $12.95, to be purchased with money from his bank account. Reluctantly, his parents agree. Unfortunately, Beaver is sold a pair three sizes too large by an unscrupulous salesman. At the rink, Beaver can hardly stand. He takes to hiding in the library while saying he's out skating. Wally finds Beaver there, after returning a copy of Gone With the Wind. Wally and Beaver try to return the skates, but the salesman quotes a no-return policy on sales items. Later, at home, Ward reads that the ice rink has been closed recently. Ward confronts Beaver about where he's been going. Beaver tells him about the skates and says he didn't say anything before because he didn't want his parents to think he was stupid. Beaver wishes his parents had been mean enough to deny him new skates. After Ward gets the truth, he won't let the store get away with it, and will get a refund. Ward says kids should learn to handle responsibility before they try to take it. Guests: Richard Correll as Richard Rickover, Stanley Fafara as Whitey Whitney, Stanley Clements as Shoe Salesman, Allan Ray as Bert.
166	10	"Weekend Invitation"	David Butler	Joe Connelly & Bob Mosher and Dick Conway & Roland MacLane	December 9, 1961	16113
Wally is invited, along with some other guys, on a weekend trip to his new friend Scott's cottage by the lake. Ward and June are reluctant to let Wally go as they don't know this Scott or his parents. Ward feels pressured when Scott needs an immediate answer. After Ward learns that all the other parents have already given permission, he lets Wally go. Wally tells them that Scott's parents aren't driving but that Scott is taking all the guys in his own car. June thinks Ward gave his permission too soon. The next day Wally learns from Scott that his parents aren't even going to be there. Wally now feels uncomfortable about the trip, but after Scott and Lumpy tease him a bit, he decides to still go. Ward learns from Fred Rutherford that Scott's parents will not be there. But before Ward can say anything, Wally admits the trip will be unchaperoned. He asks if he can still go, but Ward and June ultimately forbid him from going. It turns out all the other parents did the same thing, effectively cancelling the trip. Scott tells Wally that he wishes his dad would care enough to tell him not to do something. Guests: Frank Bank as Clarence Rutherford, Richard Deacon as Fred Rutherford, David Kent as Scott.
167	11	"Beaver's English Test"	Norman Abbott	Dick Conway & Roland MacLane	December 16, 1961	16116
Ward convinces Wally to tutor Beaver and Gilbert since they're having a rough time getting through English class. Wally gives Beaver and Gilbert one of his old English tests for them to study, but the next day their teacher, by coincidence, gives them the exact same test to take. Both Beaver and Gilbert ace this test, but Beaver feels guilty that he cheated, because of the test he had studied the night before. Beaver asks Ward what he should do. Eventually Beaver confesses to his teacher, Mr. Blair, who isn't angered, but questions Beaver on how he felt about the situation. Beaver admits that he's not as good at English is his recent test indicated. Mr. Blair is impressed with Beaver's knowledge of right and wrong and hopes Beaver will study and try harder in the future. Guests: Stephen Talbot as Gilbert Bates, Wendell Holmes as Mr. Blair. Gilbert is incorrectly identified as "Mr. Harrison" by Mr. Blair.
168	12	"Wally's Chauffeur"	Hugh Beaumont	Dick Conway & Roland MacLane	December 23, 1961	16117
Wally and his friends are going to a fancy country club dance on Saturday. Wally and his date, Evelyn Boothby, are planning on getting a ride to the dance with Lumpy. Ward won't let Wally go with Lumpy because there will be four other couples in the car and it wouldn't be safe. June suggests Ward take them, but Wally says he's too old to have his father drive him. Wally tells Evelyn they won't be able to go with Lumpy, so she says that she'll try and find another ride for them. Evelyn asks her father if she can borrow his car and drive herself and Mr. Boothby consents. Evelyn arrives to pick up Wally and he is quite humiliated that she will be driving. His parents make him go to the dance. Wally's friends can't help but give him the business about having a girl as his chauffeur. After the dance, Lumpy tries to pull a prank on Evelyn's car, which backfires. In the end, Wally doesn't feel that bad that Evelyn drove. Guests: Frank Bank as Clarence Rutherford, Mary Mitchel as Evelyn Boothby, James Seay as Mr. Boothby, Mark Allen as Policeman, Eddie Pagett as 1st Boy (as Ed Pagett), Brad Morrow as 2nd Boy, George Spicer as 3rd Boy.
169	13	"Beaver's First Date"	David Butler	Story by : Joseph Hoffman & Lou Breslow; Teleplay by : Joe Connelly & Bob Mosher	December 30, 1961	16105
Beaver has used any excuse to avoid going to dancing class over the last two years. But this time Beaver comes home from class saying he had a really good time. Wally finds out that Beaver had a good time because of a new girl in the class named Betsy Patterson. Beaver isn't sure why he likes her, but says maybe it's because she's new. Mrs. Thompson, the dancing school teacher, is holding a party and all the boys in the class are supposed to invite a girl from the class. Beaver manages to get up enough nerve to ask Betsy, who accepts. Mrs. Thompson calls June and asks if Wally, a former dancing school student, could chaperon the dance. The night of the dance, Beaver tells Wally how nervous and scared he is. Wally tells Beaver to just watch what he does and do the same. At first Beaver has a good time, but when Betsy dances with another boy, Beaver goes off with some of his friends. Beaver tells Wally he doesn't think any girl is worth going through all the stuff he did that night. Guests: Frank Bank as Clarence Rutherford, Richard Correll as Richard Rickover, Cheryl Holdridge as Julie Foster, Pam Smith as Betsy Patterson, Stanley Fafara as Whitey Whitney, Donna Conn as Lumpy's Date, Estelle Etterre as Mrs. Thompson.
170	14	"Ward's Golf Clubs"	David Butler	Bob Ross	January 6, 1962	16119
Gilbert has a shoebox filled with golf balls he found over by the driving range. He convinces Beaver to use one of Ward's golf clubs so they can hit the balls. On Beaver's first swing, the head of the driver breaks off. What Gilbert and Beaver don't know is that Ward actually broke the club himself earlier in the day. When Wally finds out, he tells Beaver that he should tell Ward right away and not hide it. Beaver is about to tell Ward what happen, but Ward first yells at Wally for wearing his shirt without asking. Beaver decides to buy another driver after Wally says he may be able to buy it on an installment plan. Wally helps Beaver sneak the club in the house. Ward discovers the new club and questions the boys. Beaver confesses and Ward tells him chances are when one does something wrong, they're going to get caught. Guests: Stephen Talbot as Gilbert Bates, Henry Hunter as Mr. Sam Briggs.
171	15	"Farewell to Penny"	David Butler	Dick Conway & Roland MacLane	January 13, 1962	16118
Beaver is invited to a party at school for his nemesis Penny and he tells June he's not going. When Penny learns her mother invited Beaver, she says her party's ruined. Beaver finds out that Penny's family is moving out of town. Ward and June say he has to go to the party. Beaver tells Wally that now that Penny will be gone for good, he will kind of miss their fights. After the party, Beaver helps Penny with her presents. They have a very pleasant conversation and realize they will miss each other. Whitey calls Beaver and tells him that even though her family is moving, Penny will stay with her grandparents till the end of school. Now Beaver is worried that Penny will tell everyone that he said he kind of liked her. At school, Beaver and Penny start insulting each other again. But are they just putting on an act? Guests: Karen Sue Trent as Penny Woods, Stanley Fafara as Whitey Whitney, Wendell Holmes as Mr. Blair, Jean Vander Pyl as Mrs. Woods. This was Wendell Holmes' last appearance of his five appearances on the series. He died at 47, on April 27, three months after this episode aired.
172	16	"Beaver, the Bunny"	Anton M. Leader	Dick Conway & Roland MacLane	January 20, 1962	16121
Beaver volunteers to be in the school pageant, but is now angry and embarrassed to be playing a cute bunny rabbit. All the children have to get dressed at home before going to the pageant. The day of the pageant, Ward calls June and says he has to work late, so he won't be able to drive Beaver there. Wally gets Lumpy to drive both him and Beaver. On the way there, Lumpys car gets a flat tire. Beaver, dressed in his costume, now has to walk the rest of the way to school on his own. Beaver tries not to be seen on his walk. Pageant director Miss Lawrence is concerned when Beaver doesn't show up early as he was supposed to. When Wally arrives, Miss Lawrence asks him to go look for Beaver. Beaver gets chased by some dogs and seeks refuge in a phone booth. He calls home, but his parents have left for the pageant. So, he calls the police department and explains his situation, and they rescue and deliver him to school just in time. Wally tells Ward that if Beaver can hop across the stage after all he's been through, "he has more guts than any kid in the whole world." Guests: Frank Bank as Clarence Rutherford, Richard Correll as Richard Rickover, Stanley Fafara as Whitey Whitney, Karen Sue Trent as Penny Woods, Alice Backes as Miss Lawrence, John Damler as Sergeant, Sid Kane as 1st Man, Jean Cook as 1st Woman, John McKee as Policeman, Jimmy Carter as Herman, Wally Wood as Boy, Lelani Sorenson as Phyllis (as Lei Lani Sorensen). Final appearance of Penny Woods.
173	17	"Beaver's Electric Trains"	Hugh Beaumont	Dick Conway & Roland MacLane	January 27, 1962	16120
Beaver agrees to let June give his old electric train set, that he hasn't played with in over two years, to neighbor boy Johnny Battson. Beaver and Gilbert play with the train to make sure it still works and start having fun with it. Beaver changes his mind about giving the train away. Georgia Battson, Johnny's pretty teen-aged sister, comes by to pick up the train set. Beaver isn't home, and knowing he wanted to keep them, Wally reluctantly gives Georgia the set. Beaver is furious with Wally for giving away the train just because he thought Georgia was cute. Ward tells Beaver that when you make a promise, you don't go back on your word. Beaver realizes that giving the train set away was the right thing to do. Guests: Stephen Talbot as Gilbert Bates, Toby Michaels as Georgia Battson.
174	18	"Beaver's Long Night"	Hugh Beaumont	Dick Conway & Roland MacLane	February 3, 1962	16124
Beaver and Gilbert are permitted to stay home alone while the rest of the family is out at various activities. All is well, and the boys watch a mystery movie on TV that makes them jumpy and a little scared to be home alone. Meanwhile, unbeknownst to the boys, Lumpy and Bill Scott have arrangements to pick up Wally late at night, after his basketball game, to go to a masquerade party. They arrive outside the Cleaver’s house dressed in gangster attire and Lumpy wearing a hideous mask. They park on the wrong side of the street, turn out their car lights, in a car Beaver doesn't recognize - all in an attempt to scare Wally when he gets home. Gilbert and Beaver, of course, don't know any of this and see this strange car complete with gangsters with masks outside their house late at night, and call the police. The result is that Lumpy and Bill are arrested. After speaking with Wally, Beaver and Gilbert realize it was Lumpy that they called the police on. But they don't tell Wally, who decides to stay home because he's tired. An irate Fred Rutherford calls Ward because he believes Ward called the police. Ward and June speak to Beaver and Gilbert about finding out the facts before jumping to conclusions. Gilbert tells Beaver that if he wanted to get into that much trouble, he could've stayed home. Guests: Stephen Talbot as Gilbert Bates, Frank Bank as Clarence Rutherford, Richard Deacon as Fred Rutherford, David Kent as Bill Scott.
175	19	"Beaver's Jacket"	David Butler	Bob Ross	February 10, 1962	16125
Beaver talks his parents into letting him buy an expensive jacket just like Richard's. The first day Beaver has the jacket, he learns that Richard lost his jacket. Richard says he knows where he lost it, so he's hoping he will eventually get it back. He comes up with a plan so that he won't get in trouble with his parents for losing his new jacket. The plan entails Beaver and him sharing Beaver's jacket. For several days Beaver and Richard sneak Beaver's jacket in and out of the Cleaver house. But one morning Richard doesn't bring the jacket because his mother sent it to the cleaners. Richard gets his jacket back, but Beaver gets caught sneaking it into the house. Beaver explains everything to his parents. Guests: Richard Correll as Richard Rickover.
176	20	"Nobody Loves Me"	David Butler	Story by : Joe Connelly & Bob Mosher; Teleplay by : Katherine and Dale Eunson	February 17, 1962	16122
Beaver wallows in self-pity when he thinks his parents don't love him. Beaver has a series of misadventures with his parents and his brother in which they all appear to continually scold and chastize him for, well, being Beaver: looking over their shoulders, spilling water at the dinner table, and being dirty and wearing dirty clothes. The last straw is when his mom and dad fail to kiss him goodnight. He concludes he is no longer loved or wanted in the house. Wally clues in his mom about Beaver's feelings, and blames it on his "age". Beaver visits his old teacher Miss Landers and his old fireman friend Gus, in order to receive positive validation of himself. But comments from them reinforce Beaver's negative perception of himself. Later, taking Wally's cue (Thanks, Wally) mom and dad put on a show for Beaver as a reaffirmation of their unconditional love for him. Problem solved. Guests: Sue Randall as Miss Alice Landers, Richard Correll as Richard Rickover, Burt Mustin as Gus the Fireman. Final appearance of Miss Landers.
177	21	"Beaver's Fear"	David Butler	Dick Conway & Roland MacLane	February 24, 1962	16126
Wally needs to find a fifth person to go to the new amusement park in Bellport on their five person entrance discount. He reluctantly ends up choosing Beaver. But after claiming to be brave enough to go with Wally and his friends to the amusement park, Beaver discovers his fear of roller coasters. He gets a pep talk from Gus the fireman, and bravely goes off with the "big guys" to the amusement park. The tables are turned, however, when Eddie is the one who faints from fear on the roller coaster ride, while everyone else, including the Beaver, have a great time. Beaver makes a giant leap from little boy to big guy in this episode. Guests: Ken Osmond as Eddie Haskell, Richard Correll as Richard Rickover, Stanley Fafara as Whitey Whitney, Frank Bank as Clarence Rutherford, Burt Mustin as Gus the Fireman, David Kent as Bill Scott. Final appearance of Gus the Fireman.
178	22	"Three Boys and a Burro"	David Butler	Dick Conway & Roland MacLane	March 3, 1962	16129
Beaver, Gilbert and Richard see that someone in the neighborhood is selling a burro for $30. They come up with the idea of each chipping in to buy the burro together. Gilbert and Richard get their parents permission, but Ward and June initially tell Beaver no. Ward and June give in because Beaver says that the burro will stay at either Richard's or Gilbert's house. Pepe the burro, first causes destruction at Richard's house and then the same at Gilbert's house. While the Cleavers are out for the evening, Richard and Gilbert leave Pepe at Beaver's house. Pepe ends up being just as destructive there. When the boys try to take the burro back to the original owners, they discover they have moved. After several failed attempts, Ward finds a new home for Pepe. Guests: Stephen Talbot as Gilbert Bates, Richard Correll as Richard Rickover, Jane Dulo as Mrs. Rickover, Claudia Bryar as Mrs. Bates.
179	23	"Eddie Quits School"	Jeffrey Hayden	Dick Conway & Roland MacLane	March 10, 1962	16127
Eddie tells Wally and Lumpy that his dad is allowing him to quit high school to take a job as a local garage attendant. All the guys are jealous when Eddie brags about the money he'll be making. Eddie at first acts very cocky about his new lifestyle. Wally and Lumpy stop at the filling station without Eddie knowing. They witness his new boss criticize his clumsy, sloppy work. Eddie pretends that everything is going well. But it does seem as though it's not as easy any more for Eddie to get together with his friends. Wally starts to think that Eddie is not happy with his new life and he can't admit he made a mistake. Wally talks to Mr. Farmer, the principal, to see if there is anything they could do about Eddie. Mr. Farmer goes to buy gasoline from Eddie and hints that he is needed back at school to help manage a sports team. Eddie, in his usual cocky way, lets Wally and Lumpy know he's coming back to school. Guests: Ken Osmond as Eddie Haskell, Frank Bank as Clarence Rutherford, David Kent as Bill Scott, Frank Wilcox as Mr. Farmer, Bert Remsen as Mr. Thompson. Last appearance of four for David Kent as Bill Scott.
180	24	"Wally Stays at Lumpy's"	David Butler	Dick Conway & Roland MacLane	March 17, 1962	16130
Wally tells June that he's going to a party at Lumpy's house on Friday night. Beaver asks if Gilbert can spend the night on Friday. Because Wally will be gone and she and Ward will be out for the night, June says Gilbert can come by but not spend the night. Wally asks Ward if he could spend the night at Lumpy's after the party, but Ward says he should come home. After the party, Lumpy talks Wally into staying over to help him clean up. Beaver finds out from Wally that he's staying at Lumpy's. Beaver then decides that Gilbert can stay over with him. The next morning, Ward and June are confused as to how Gilbert wound up there and Wally was at Lumpy's. They discover that the way they phrased things, they unwittingly give the boys an escape clause. Guests: Stephen Talbot as Gilbert Bates, Frank Bank as Clarence Rutherford, Richard Deacon as Fred Rutherford.
181	25	"Beaver's Laundry"	David Butler	Joseph Hoffman	March 24, 1962	16123
The Rickover's washing machine is broken, so Beaver offers to help Richard take the family's clothes down to the laundromat. Mrs. Rickover gave Richard $3 to clean the clothes, but on the way to the laundromat, he loses it. Richard asks Beaver if he thinks Beaver's mother will do the laundry instead. But when they get to Beaver's house, there is no one around. Richard suggests they do the laundry themselves using the Cleaver's washing machine. Neither one knows what they're doing, and soon there's a giant mess in the laundry room and into the kitchen. Wally and Eddie show up, see the mess, and for different reasons, help with the clean up. Ward and June wonder why the boys would clean the kitchen floor without being made to. The boys say they just wanted to do something nice, but Ward is suspicious. June finds the empty box of laundry soap, and she and Ward think they know what happened. Knowing that the boys took responsibility, they decide not to say anything to them. Guests: Richard Correll as Richard Rickover, Ken Osmond as Eddie Haskell.
182	26	"Lumpy's Car Trouble"	David Butler	Dick Conway & Roland MacLane and Joe Connelly & Bob Mosher	March 31, 1962	16132
Lumpy is going to drive Wally, Beaver, and Eddie to an out-of-town track meet. At the last minute, Lumpy tells Wally that his car isn't running. Since Wally doesn't have a drivers license, and Ward is busy, Ward reluctantly lets Lumpy drive the Cleaver's car. Wally has promised to stay on the main road, but Lumpy and Eddie convince him to let them take a shortcut on the way home. The boys then break down on a dirt road in the middle of the woods. They push the car to a shop to have it repaired and don't tell Ward when they get home. Later, one of Ward's co-workers tells Ward that he spotted the boys pushing his car from the dirt road to the highway. Ward confronts Wally and Beaver to find out what happened. They confess what happened and Ward tells them the car is off limits for a while. Ward also refuses to tell them how he found out, hoping that will ensure the boys are always on their best behavior and may be caught at any time. Guests: Ken Osmond as Eddie Haskell, Frank Bank as Clarence Rutherford, Richard Deacon as Fred Rutherford, Pat McCaffrie as Bill Boothby.
183	27	"Beaver the Babysitter"	David Butler	Joseph Hoffman	April 7, 1962	16133
Wally is looking forward to his double date with Eddie this evening. June reminds him that he promised to babysit five-year-old Chuckie Murdock this evening. Wally calls a bunch of his friends, but none of them can babysit in his place. Wally convinces Beaver and their parents that Beaver is capable of doing the job. When Beaver gets to the Murdock house he finds that he isn't sitting with five-year old Chuckie, but instead with ten-year-old daughter Patricia. Pat decides she wants to play house. Wally and Eddie stop by and now Beaver is afraid word will get out that he played girl games. To make matters worse, the next day at school, Pat follows Beaver all around. When the Murdock's ask for Beaver to babysit again, Wally volunteers to do it instead. Pat eventually stops following Beaver around. Beaver tells Gilbert that he actually kind of misses her. Guests: Ken Osmond as Eddie Haskell, Stephen Talbot as Gilbert Bates, Rory Stevens as Chuckie Murdock, Marjorie Reynolds as Mrs. Murdock, Stephen Courtleigh as Mr. Murdock, Jennie Lynn as Pat Murdock.
184	28	"The Younger Brother"	David Butler	Dick Conway & Roland MacLane	April 14, 1962	16131
Ward urges Beaver to follow in Wally's footsteps and try out for the basketball team. Beaver is at first reluctant, but signs up anyway. Remembering how good Wally was, the Coach is looking forward to another Cleaver trying out for the team. At the first practice, Beaver finds he lacks his older brother's talent and he doesn't make the team. Afraid to disappoint the family, Beaver doesn't tell anyone. Ward and Fred Rutherford stop by a practice to watch Beaver. The Coach informs Ward that Beaver didn't make the team. Beaver finally tells Wally, but he asks Wally not to say anything to Ward. Wally does speak to his parents and hopes that Ward will be easy on the Beaver as he feels so bad that he let everyone down. The family tells Beaver there will be other things that he will be great at. Guests: Richard Correll as Richard Rickover, Ken Osmond as Eddie Haskell, Richard Deacon as Fred Rutherford, Russ Conway as Mr. Doyle.
185	29	"Beaver's Typewriter"	David Butler	Dick Conway & Roland MacLane	April 21, 1962	16134
Beaver sees an advertisement for a typewriter on sale and he tries to convince his parents to buy it for him. Despite him not knowing how to type, he uses the argument that typing will help in his schoolwork and his grades. After Beaver promises to stick with it, Ward agrees. Learning how to type is harder than Beaver expected. When Eddie comes by, Beaver is amazed to see that Eddie knows how to type. Eddie agrees to type out Beaver's composition for $1. Mr. Bailey, Beaver's English teacher, is so impressed by the improvement in Beaver's work, that he sends a note home for Beaver's parents. The only problem is that his teacher will expect future reports to be typewritten as well. Mr. Bailey is disappointed when Beaver hand writes his next assignment. Beaver lies and tells his teacher that the typewriter is broken. Beaver feels really bad and confesses to Ward what he did. He then promises to keep practicing his typing. Guests: Stephen Talbot as Gilbert Bates, Ken Osmond as Eddie Haskell, Ed Prentiss as Mr. Bailey.
186	30	"The Merchant Marine"	David Butler	Dick Conway & Roland MacLane	April 28, 1962	16136
Ward yells at Wally for coming home two hours late and not phoning. While cleaning Wally's room, June finds literature regarding joining the Merchant Marine. June wonders if Ward's reprimand could make Wally unhappy enough to leave home. What they don't know is that the literature was for Lumpy Rutherford. Lumpy is angry with his dad for taking his car keys away and had the enlistment information sent to the Cleaver's address instead of his own. Trying to be a good friend, Wally hid the literature in his room. June calls Ward when another letter arrives. Ward speaks to Wally and finds out the information was for Lumpy. Not knowing it was his son that wanted to join the Merchant Marine, Fred Rutherford comes to an understanding with Lumpy; and Lumpy decides not to join. Guests: Frank Bank as Clarence Rutherford, Richard Deacon as Fred Rutherford.
187	31	"Brother Versus Brother"	David Butler	Bob Ross	May 5, 1962	16135
The class gets a new student and Beaver is immediately smitten with Mary Tyler. Because he doesn't know how to act around girls, Beaver asks Wally for advice. Wally says he should ask Mary if he can walk her home from school. Mary visits Beaver's home. They both agree to not walk home with anyone else. It seems Mary has an ulterior motive in making this pact with Beaver. Much to his chagrin, she shows a great interest in Wally. Wally tries to rebuff and avoid her, but in Beaver's eyes, Wally is doing whatever he can to make Mary like him better. Beaver is furious with Wally. Wally tells Mary to stop following him around. She gets mad and says she never wants to speak to him again. Mary then asks Beaver to walk her home and he tells her to drop dead. Beaver makes up with Wally. Guests: Stephen Talbot as Gilbert Bates, Richard Correll as Richard Rickover, Mimi Gibson as Mary Tyler, Hardie Albright as Mr. Collins.
188	32	"The Yard Birds"	David Butler	Dick Conway & Roland MacLane	May 12, 1962	16137
Despite both boys having other plans, Ward tells them that they will have to spend Saturday morning cleaning the yard. Ward and June go off shopping and the boys start their yard work. They are supposed to have everything done by 1 o'clock as that is the garbage man's pick-up deadline. But it's not long before distractions keep them from getting the job done. Before they know it, it's 2:30 and they missed the garbage pick-up. Things get worse when they trust Eddie and Lumpy to take the trash to the dump in Lumpy's car. Instead of the dump, Eddie and Lumpy leave everything in a vacant lot. Mr. Hill, the owner of the vacant lot, comes to complain to Ward. Ward tells the four boys they will have to clean the lot and take the garbage to the dump. Guests: Richard Correll as Richard Rickover, Ken Osmond as Eddie Haskell, Frank Bank as Clarence Rutherford, Bartlett Robinson as Mr. Hill.
189	33	"Tennis, Anyone?"	Hugh Beaumont	Dick Conway & Roland MacLane	May 19, 1962	16138
Wally is going to meet Eddie at the tennis court, even though Wally hasn't played in quite some time. While Wally waits for Eddie, he sits next to pretty and older Carole Martin. She asks Wally if he would like to play some tennis while he waits. What Wally doesn't know is that Carole just had a fight with her boyfriend, Don Kirk, who is not far away. Carole only asked Wally to play to make Don jealous. Wally asks Carole if she would like to play again tomorrow. The family finds out Wally didn't play with Eddie, but he won't tell them who he did play with. Carole gets more and more friendly with Wally whenever Don is around. Don approaches Wally and tells him to stop seeing Carole. Wally asks Ward what he should do and Ward tells him he should probably not see Carole again. Wally goes to the tennis court the next day and sees Don and Carole there kissing. Wally tells June that he is surprised that Ward knows so much about love and stuff. Guests: Cynthia Chenault as Carole Martin (as Cindy Robbins), Ken Osmond as Eddie Haskell, Stephen Talbot as Gilbert Bates, Frank Bank as Clarence Rutherford, James Drake as Don Kirk.
190	34	"One of the Boys"	Jeffrey Hayden	Joe Connelly & Bob Mosher and Gwen Gielgud	May 26, 1962	16104
Eddie and Wally have been asked the join the Barons, a popular club at school. Wally doesn't know the boys in the club too well, so he's a bit hesitant about joining. He finds out that they are all about fast sports cars, expensive clothes and attracting fast girls. Ward learns from the vice-principal that the boys in the club are overly privileged, spoiled and not concerned about their grades. Despite June's objections, Ward convinces her that Wally is old enough to make up his own mind about joining. After spending some time with the guys in the club, Wally isn't that excited about joining. He tells Eddie to go to the initiation meeting by himself. Eddie says that the club only agreed to take him if he got Wally to join. The club believes that having Wally join would make the club look better. Wally agrees to go, but Eddie and Wally later decide to not join the club. Guests: Ken Osmond as Eddie Haskell, Frank Bank as Clarence Rutherford, Stephanie Hill as Bessie, Robert Reuben Singer as Ted (as Robert Singer), Martin Dean as Rick Davis.
191	35	"Sweatshirt Monsters"	David Butler	Dick Conway & Roland MacLane	June 2, 1962	16139
Beaver and his friends buy sweatshirts with monster faces on them, and they all plan to wear them to school the next day. However, none of their parents are impressed with their purchases, and forbid them to wear these sweatshirts to school. Beaver sneaks his own under his other clothes anyway. He ends up being the only one holding the bag, when no one else went through with wearing theirs. Beaver is sent to the principal's office. Ward is called to bring Beaver home, and not to bring him back until he's dressed properly. After school, Beaver asks Wally if he could talk to Ward to find out how mad he is. Without even asking anything, Wally learns that Ward is not in a good mood. Ward later explains to Beaver that wrong is wrong, even if everybody says it's right. And right is right, even if everybody says it's wrong. Guests: Richard Correll as Richard Rickover, Stanley Fafara as Hubert "Whitey" Whitney, Doris Packer as Mrs. Cornelia Rayburn, Hardie Albright as Mr. Collins, Jane Dulo as Mrs. Rickover, Mark Murray as Alan Boothby.
192	36	"A Night in the Woods"	David Butler	Dick Conway & Roland MacLane	June 9, 1962	16140
Gilbert's dad has to work late, making him unable to take Gilbert, Beaver, Whitey and Alan on a camping trip. Wally eventually agrees to take the boys as he has made no other plans for the weekend. Eddie and Lumpy tell Wally that they could have a triple date on Sunday, but the girls won't go unless Wally goes. Eddie and Lumpy make a few attempts to get Wally to change his plans, but he's still going camping. Eddie and Lumpy arrive separately Saturday night and try to scare the boys with sound effects of wild animals from a portable phonograph. But when a real coyote howls, a panicked Eddie and Lumpy run off. While running in the dark, Eddie falls off a cliff and lands on a ledge. Lumpy comes back to the boys camp to tell Wally what happened. The park ranger must be summoned to throw Eddie a harness and pull him to safety. Guests: Ken Osmond as Eddie Haskell, Stephen Talbot as Gilbert Bates, Frank Bank as Clarence Rutherford, John Hart as Forest Ranger, Stanley Fafara as Hubert "Whitey" Whitney, Mark Murray as Alan Boothby.
193	37	"Long Distance Call"	Norman Abbott	Dick Conway & Roland MacLane	June 16, 1962	16143
Ward, June and Wally are out for the day. Beaver is left at home with friends Alan and Gilbert. After Gilbert makes two prank phone calls, they all decide to make a long-distance call to baseball star Don Drysdale in Los Angeles, each intending to chip in for the cost of the call. But because they had to wait for Drysdale to get out of the shower to talk, the call turns out to cost a lot more than they expected. The next day in school, the boys brag about the call to other boys. Kenny tells his father, who works for the local newspaper, about their call. The news of their chat with Drysdale makes the paper, and it gets them all in trouble with their parents. Ward tells them that they had no right to use his telephone to call or prank-call anyone without permission, and decides he wants all the boys to do yard work for him after school for a week to cover the extra cost. Afterwards, Ward questions Beaver if all this was worth it, and Beaver claims nothing is worth having his father be disappointed in him. Guests: Stephen Talbot as Gilbert Bates, Mark Murray as Alan Boothby, Dennis Olvieri as Kenny (as Dennis Joel), Ray Montgomery as Kenny's Father, Kevin Jones as 1st Boy, Johnny Eimen as 2nd Boy, Don Drysdale as himself.
194	38	"Stocks and Bonds"	Norman Abbott	Story by : Joe Connelly & Bob Mosher; Teleplay by : Allan Manings	June 23, 1962	16141
Wally is studying about stocks and bonds in school. Ward gives Wally a real-life lesson in economics by helping him and Beaver invest one hundred dollars in the stock market. After speaking with Eddie, the boys want to invest in a space tech stock. Ward thinks they should buy a utility stock. The boys get frustrated when their utility stock doesn't show much activity. And to make matters worse, the space tech stock is going up every day. The boys convince Ward to sell the utility stock and buy the tech stock. After going up for several days, the tech stock bottoms out. The boys feel really bad, until Ward tells them he had his broker sell the tech stock if it dropped below a certain point. The boys didn't lose all their money and now have a new found appreciation for their dad's advice. Guests: Ken Osmond as Eddie Haskell.
195	39	"Un-Togetherness"	Norman Abbott	Dick Conway & Roland MacLane	June 30, 1962	16147
Ward has made plans for the family to go up to Crescent Lake for a two week vacation during summer break. Beaver is excited by the news, but Wally seems uninterested. Beaver suspects that Wally doesn't want to go because he likes Lori-Ann, the new girl working at the library. Wally asks his parents if it's OK if he doesn't go to the lake with them. Ward and June know they can't force Wally to go. Wally says that he'll stay at Eddie's house for the two weeks. He finally admits that it's because of Lori-Ann that he wants to stay home. Wally later finds out that Lori-Ann will be away with her parents for the summer. Wally doesn't tell the family and they take off for the trip. While driving off, they see Eddie and he tells them about Lori-Ann. They go back to get Wally. Guests: Ken Osmond as Eddie Haskell, Brenda Scott as Lori-Ann.
