= Leave It to Beaver season 4 =

Leave It to Beaver
- Season 4
- No. of episodes: 39

Release
- Original network: ABC
- Original release: October 1, 1960 – June 24, 1961

Season chronology
- ← Previous; Season 3 Next → Season 5

The fourth season of the American television situation comedy Leave It to Beaver premiered on October 1, 1960 and concluded on June 24, 1961. It consisted of 39 episodes shot in black-and-white, each running approximately 25 minutes in length.

== Episodes ==
No. overall	No. in season	Title	Directed by	Written by	Original release date	Prod. code
118	1	"Beaver Won't Eat"	Norman Abbott	Bob Ross	October 1, 1960	13254
Beaver won't eat his Brussels sprouts and thus jeopardizes his chance to join an upcoming family outing, to a football game featuring two of the best pro teams, including the Green Bay Packers. June is insistent about Beaver finishing his sprouts. She appeals to Ward, who commands, "Eat, Beaver." Eddie comes by, suspects Ward and June's lack of resolve, and encourages Beaver: "Hold the fort, kid. They're cracking." Ward compromises and says Beaver can go with the family but must eat his sprouts the next time they're served. At a restaurant, Beaver finds the vegetable du jour is Brussels sprouts. The wait staff and another diner notice Beaver's reluctance, and intervene, creating a scene. Beaver reluctantly puts one in his mouth and Wally slaps him on the back, causing Beaver to swallow the sprout. He decides Brussels sprouts are not so bad. Later, Ward and June tell Beaver that he, too, will ask his kids to do things they don't want, out of love. But Ward admits that sometimes even parents make mistakes. Beaver is impressed that his father can admit to making a mistake. Guests: Ken Osmond as Eddie Haskell, Hal J. Smith as Restaurant Manager, Netta Packer as Customer, Bea Silvern as Waitress.
119	2	"Beaver's House Guest"	Norman Abbott	Arthur Kober	October 8, 1960	13251
Beaver has returned from summer camp, Camp König, having gained a few pounds, because he's been sharing the treats sent to his new friend, Dryden "Chopper" Cooper. However, Chopper is the victim of his divorced parents' manipulative games: he is shuttled about and the recipient of extravagant gifts as they vie for his affection. When Chopper comes to stay for the weekend, he brings magnificent gifts for the Cleavers, and Beaver envies Chopper's unusual life. Ward and June are surprised that Chopper is escorted by his "Uncle" Dave, Chopper's mother's boyfriend who Chopper believes will be his new stepfather. Beaver looks hopefully for signs that his parents may be unhappy and themselves get divorced, not really understanding what that means. Then Chopper's mother calls; she has "the weepies" and Chopper is forced to cut short his weekend with Beaver, because he needs to support his emotionally frail mother. As he packs, Chopper frets about he never gets to have any real fun, because of this recurring burden, and how his parents are always telling him about how terrible the other parent is. After Chopper leaves, Beaver realizes he is very lucky to have a stable family life and parents who love each other. Guests: Barry Gordon as Chopper, Clark Howat as Uncle Dave.
120	3	"Beaver Becomes a Hero"	Gene Reynolds	Story by : Frank Gabrielson; Teleplay by : Joe Connelly & Bob Mosher	October 15, 1960	13252
While fishing with Wally, Beaver retrieves a drifting canoe and returns it to its owner. The owner promises Beaver a reward in the mail. At school, the story makes the rounds and is embellished into a tale of rescuing a rich man's daughter in a runaway speedboat. It comes to the attention of Miss Landers, as well as a newspaper offer of $25 for each interesting item sent in, money the class might use. Without Beaver's knowledge, thinking Beaver might be hurt if it is found uninteresting, the class sends the story to the newspaper. Wally is taken aback to find the misinformation in print and tells Beaver that he has to tell their parents the truth. Beaver then corrects the tale in class. Miss Landers suggests he is a real hero for bravely telling the truth. The boat owner sends Beaver $5.00 and a very nice letter thanking him. Guests: Richard Correll as Richard Rickover, Stanley Fafara as Whitey Whitney, Burt Mustin as Gus the Fireman, Sue Randall as Miss Landers, Neil Seflinger as Student, Larry Thor as Willard Watson, Jeri Weil as Judy Hensler. Eddie Haskell has shifted his college hopes to M.I.T., from Annapolis, because it takes too long to become an admiral. Last appearance of Jeri Weil as Judy Hensler.
121	4	"Wally, the Lifeguard"	Andrew McCullough	George Tibbles, Joe Connelly & Bob Mosher	October 22, 1960	13256
Wally is offered a job as a lifeguard at Friends Lake, much to the excitement of both Beaver and Eddie. However, once on the site, he is informed he has to be over 18 to qualify as a lifeguard, and he is reassigned to a position as a hot dog vendor. When his family arrives at the lake for a picnic, with Gilbert and Whitey along (and Eddie dropping by with two lady friends), everyone is surprised by Wally's mundane job. Wally explains the circumstances, but Beaver feels let down and refuses to talk to his brother. Later, Ward tells Beaver how Wally once bragged to his friends about Ward being a high school football hero to make himself a big shot in front of his friends, but felt let down when it turned out Ward was only a second-string teammate who rarely ever played. Beaver feels like a heel and begins talking to Wally again. Guests: Ken Osmond as Eddie Haskell, Stephen Talbot as Gilbert Bates, Stanley Fafara as Whitey Whitney, John Hiestand as Mr. Burton, Pamela Baird as Mary Ellen Rogers (as Pamela Beaird), Richard Gering as Lifeguard, Carol Sydes as Alma Hanson (uncredited).
122	5	"Beaver's Freckles"	Norman Abbott	Story by : William Cowley and Peggy Chantler Dick (as Peggy Chantler); Teleplay by : Joe Connelly & Bob Mosher	October 29, 1960	13253
Beaver, Larry and Whitey are polishing Lumpy Rutherford's convertible. Beaver hates his freckles after Lumpy teases him about them. Beaver sandpapers his face and comes to the dinner table wearing his mother's make-up. Ward tries to put Beaver's freckles in proper perspective by saying what's important is not what he looks like but what kind of person he is. Later, Beaver talks to befreckled Clyde Appleby who says he likes his freckles because they attract people's notice. Beaver then begins to like his. Ward says one of the great advantages of being a kid is that problems seldom last more than a day. Guests: Rusty Stevens as Larry Mondello, Frank Bank as Lumpy Rutherford, Stanley Fafara as Whitey Whitney, Stephen Wootton as Clyde Appleby.
123	6	"Beaver's Big Contest"	Gene Reynolds	Story by : Arthur Kober; Teleplay by : Joe Connelly & Bob Mosher	November 5, 1960	13255
Beaver sells raffle tickets to benefit the new hospital at $1 apiece and, when he sells a complete book, he gets a free ticket for himself. Beaver wins the raffle's expensive, $3,500 sports car but Ward tells him the car must be sold and the money put in Beaver's bank account. Beaver, who earlier had been told by a snickering Eddie that his father might take away any prizes he won, becomes angry and grows unreasonable, giving Ward the silent treatment. Eventually, Beaver realizes his father is right, the car is sold, and Beaver begins talking to his father again. Guests: Ken Osmond as Eddie Haskell, Burt Mustin as Gus the Fireman, Rusty Stevens as Larry Mondello, Mark Allen as Policeman, Lenore Kingston as Lady at Mailbox. Rusty Stevens leaves the show after 67 appearances as Larry Mondello. Stevens would appear in flashbacks as Larry in the final retrospective episode, "Family Scrapbook". Madge Blake as Larry's mother, Mrs. Mondello, would also leave the show. During the episode, in an interlude, Wally finds June listening dreamily to a recording of Lucia di Lammermoor. Wally is astonished when she tells of seeing it in New York City, and of attending a fight in Madison Square Garden. Later Ward derisively guesses at the old boyfriend she might have seen it with.
124	7	"Miss Landers' Fiancé"	Norman Abbott	Joe Connelly & Bob Mosher	November 12, 1960	13261
While doing yard work for his teacher, with Whitey, Beaver is crushed when he learns Miss Landers is engaged to Tom Brittingham. When Monday comes, Beaver feels sick and stays in bed. He tells Wally why he's upset and says he hopes to never see Miss Landers again after what she has done to him. When Miss Landers arrives at the house with his homework assignment and learns the cause of his illness, she explains to him that teachers have as much right as anyone else to fall in love and get married. Beaver understands and wants her to be happy. He just wishes there was some other way she could do it. Miss Landers assures Beaver he will like her husband, and that he will be invited to her wedding. Guests: Sue Randall as Miss Landers, Stanley Fafara as Whitey Whitney, Jack Powers as Tom Brittingham. Brittingham addresses Miss Landers as Alice, although indistinctly. Moreover, the engagement announcement in the newspaper, which is visible in this episode, gives her first name as Alice, which is otherwise never mentioned in the series. Although Miss Landers' engagement is announced in this episode, and she subsequently appears in nine additional episodes over the next 15 months, no mention is ever made of her eventual marriage. However, five episodes after this one, a glittering ring on her left hand is clearly seen as she speaks with June about a problem. She is still referred to as "Miss Landers" in all subsequent episodes.
125	8	"Eddie's Double-Cross"	Norman Abbott	Joe Connelly & Bob Mosher	November 19, 1960	13260
Wally and Eddie meet up with Alma and Caroline. At Eddie's behest, Wally pays a whole 80 cents, including tip, for four sodas and sundaes. Wally overhears Eddie's new girl Caroline telling her friends she can't stand Eddie and is only going with him because her boyfriend is grounded for two weeks. Beaver doesn't understand how girls can be considered such rats, but then remembers the story of Samson and Delilah from Sunday school. After consulting with Ward, Wally tells Eddie, and Eddie accuses his friend of making up stories to move in on his girl. Ward thinks he gave Wally bad advice. Eddie later tells Beaver he realized Wally was telling the truth but didn't like his best friend knowing other people thought he was a creep. Eddie asks Beaver's help in finding a way to apologize to Wally. Guests: Ken Osmond as Eddie Haskell, Carol Sydes as Alma Hanson, Reba Waters as Caroline Shuster, Audrey Clark as Waitress, Howard Wright as Mr. Newton, Leslie Towner as Caroline's Friend.
126	9	"Beaver's I.Q."	Norman Abbott	Theodore and Mathilde Ferro	November 26, 1960	13257
Beaver has a very poor attitude toward doing homework and Ward is concerned that could jeopardize his future. Beaver learns from Mrs. Rayburn, who is substituting for Miss Landers, that the class is to be given an intelligence test. June thinks that the modern intelligence test can tell so much. Beaver says girls are lucky; they can be dumb but still get married. June says girls want to, and can be, doctors and lawyers, too. Then Beaver thinks he may fail the test and studies the encyclopedia. Ward tells him one can't study for an intelligence test. After the test, Beaver just has to tell Mrs. Rayburn that the Nile is 4,150 miles long. Later, Ward and June learn Beaver placed in the top ten. Beaver now thinks he doesn't have to study. Ward says the test is only a measure of potential, and that Beaver must continue to study and do his homework. Beaver glumly accepts his fate. Guests: Stanley Fafara as Whitey Whitney, Karen Sue Trent as Penny Woods, Doris Packer as Mrs. Cornelia Rayburn, Burt Mustin as Gus the Fireman, Keith Taylor as Harry Harrison.
127	10	"Wally's Glamour Girl"	Norman Abbott	Joe Connelly & Bob Mosher	December 3, 1960	13259
June sets up a date between Wally and Kitty Bannerman, the daughter of an old best friend who's in town. Wally is nervous and pretends to have a prior engagement. Beaver learns from Wally that he and Kitty exchanged a series of letters at summer camp. In his letters, in spite of their parents having been best friends, Wally created an exotic life for himself, including non-existent car ownership and that Frank Sinatra sang at a party at his house. Now, if he goes to the dance, Kitty will learn the truth. When Wally's ruse is discovered, Ward angrily insists that Wally will escort Kitty to the dance and have fun, and Ward will drive. When Wally picks Kitty up, she confesses to Wally that she created a fanciful life in her letters; Wally confesses to her that he did the same. With the truth out in the open, both feel they are going to have a nice date. When Kitty hears the car, she asks if one of Wally's friends is driving. Wally says he doesn't normally think of it that way, but he's one of the best friends Wally has. Guests: Ken Osmond as Eddie Haskell, Bernadette Withers as Kitty Bannerman.
128	11	"Chuckie's New Shoes"	Norman Abbott	Joe Connelly & Bob Mosher	December 10, 1960	13262
Ward and June leave Wally in charge at home. A neighbor, Mrs. Murdock, asks Wally to take her young son Chuckie to buy new shoes. But Eddie wants Wally to go ice-skating with him at the new rink just opening, else Mary Ellen Rogers and the other girls won't talk to him. So, Beaver volunteers for the job. At the department store, Chuckie becomes difficult, throws a tantrum and, when Beaver steps aside to pay for the shoes, wanders off. Chuckie meets a man who knows him and is taken home. When Beaver can't find Chuckie, he calls his father and tells him he's not coming home because he's lost "a whole kid." Ward assures him Chuckie is home safe. As Ward and June head out the door to pick Beaver up, Eddie is at the door, and they're overtly rude to him. Meanwhile, Wally feels bad, and realizes he made a mistake, learning an important lesson about responsibility. The next day Ward and June apologize to Eddie for being abrupt. Eddie says he tries to "make allowances" for people being the way they are, and Ward and June think they've just been insulted. Guests: Ken Osmond as Eddie Haskell, Jess Kirkpatrick as Shoe Salesman, Marjorie Reynolds as Mrs. Murdock, Rory Stevens as Chuckie Murdock, Vince Williams as Shopper.
129	12	"Beaver and Kenneth"	Norman Abbott	Joe Connelly & Bob Mosher	December 17, 1960	13265
June attends a meeting at Beaver's school where Miss Landers describes several items that have recently disappeared from student lockers. While housecleaning, June finds some of the stolen items in Beaver's room, and she worries that Beaver may be the thief. Kenneth is a lonely boy at school who steals things. It turns out he gave Beaver a few of the stolen items in order to make friends with him. Ward questions Beaver and finds out that Beaver is unaware the items are stolen. Beaver tells Ward that Kenneth gave the items to him. When Ward and Beaver go to Kenneth's house, he denies everything. However, at school, Beaver and Kenneth talk, and Kenneth then confesses to Miss Landers. She assures him he doesn't need to steal to make friends. Guests: Sue Randall as Miss Landers, Gil Rogers as Kenneth Purcel, William Bakewell as Mr. Purcel, Jean Vander Pyl as Mrs. Thompson.
130	13	"Beaver's Accordion"	Gene Reynolds	Joe Connelly & Bob Mosher	December 24, 1960	13266
Beaver is sent an impressive-looking offer for a free accordion tryout, which his parents throw away. Beaver finds the diploma-like offer when he's paid to empty the trash. Eddie, holding out a vision of playing it professionally, in a white velvet shirt, emulating Fabian and making good money, convinces him to send away for it in secret. Beaver orders the accordion through the mail for the trial period without his parents' knowledge. He intends to return it but the postage is too expensive. He puts it in a closet and forgets about it. A representative of the accordion company arrives. While Ward scoffs at the man's assertions of their having an accordion, June opens the closet. The accordion bounces noisily down the stairs and is damaged. Ward at first is quite angry with Beaver. But he promises to help Beaver pay for the damage, because he knows how easy it is for a boy to be enticed with offers of something special. Guests: Ken Osmond as Eddie Haskell, John Hoyt as Mr. Franklin, Stanley Fafara as Whitey Whitney, Rankin Mansfield as Clerk.
131	14	"Uncle Billy"	Norman Abbott	Joe Connelly & Bob Mosher	December 31, 1960	13268
Ward's uncle Billy arrives for a visit, leaving a grand looking car parked outside. Billy tells tales and promises the boys all sorts of goodies, including buying Beaver a good fishing pole and reel. Beaver goes to the sporting goods store to help pick out the equipment, but Uncle Billy never shows. Wally, alerted to Uncle Billy's lack of veracity and told to find his missing brother, tries to clue Beaver in; but Beaver won't hear of Billy's not being a man of his word. Beaver storms out, goes to Billy's hotel, and finds him in the barber shop. The barber and manicurist are rolling their eyes over Billy's tales and Beaver is embarrassed. Ward wants to lecture Billy on how his tales and promises hurt people but Beaver asks him not to "holler" at Billy. Beaver knows from experience that people sometimes make up tales to impress others. Guests: Edgar Buchanan as Uncle Billy, Henry Hunter as Sports Store Clerk, Nancy Reynolds as Manicurist.
132	15	"Teacher's Daughter"	Norman Abbott	Story by : Alan Lipscott and Bob Fisher; Teleplay by : Joe Connelly & Bob Mosher	January 7, 1961	13264
Wally is spending a suspicious amount of time bathing and making himself smell good. The Cleavers, out shopping, spot Wally in the park with classmate Julie Foster, the daughter of a Mayfield High English teacher. When Wally gets Mr. Foster for English at the start of the new semester, Eddie congratulates him on being a real operator, thinking he did it all to help his grade. Wally sees Mr. Foster about transferring to another class, but is reassured that Julie's affections will have no bearing on his grade. He also tells Wally not to care so much about what others think, which is advice Wally says he has heard before, from his father. Ward wants Wally to date others besides Julie, so Wally abruptly breaks up with Julie. Wally, listening to Eddie and now sure "the hatchet" will come out, fears that he will fail the next English test. Wally sees Mr. Foster, who tells him to tell Mr. Haskell to mind his own business. Wally and Eddie later see Lumpy strolling with Julie and figure Lumpy will get a good grade. When tests are graded and returned, Wally has an 'A−' and Lumpy an 'F'. Guests: Ken Osmond as Eddie Haskell, Cheryl Holdridge as Julie Foster, Frank Bank as Lumpy Rutherford, Ross Elliott as Mr. Foster.
133	16	"Ward's Millions"	Hugh Beaumont	Story by : Theodore and Mathilde Ferro; Teleplay by : Joe Connelly & Bob Mosher	January 14, 1961	13263
Beaver thinks Ward is worried about money. Beaver wants his father to become a millionaire. Instead of buying himself a new "Red River Sam" cowboy adventure novel, Beaver buys How to Become a Millionaire in Twelve Months for Ward. Ward says the book will have an honored place on his shelf. But, in a moment of distraction, June puts the book in the kitchen cookie drawer where Beaver discovers it "all crumbed up". He's hurt and hides up a tree. Ward explains he only said that he'd place the book on his shelf because he didn't want to hurt Beaver's feelings. Beaver admits he didn't really think his father would become a millionaire. Wally explains to Beaver that such books sell because adults imagine themselves as millionaires, as Beaver imagines himself as Red River Sam. Beaver tells Wally he didn't realize that grownups can be as goofy as kids. Wally says to not say anything about that at dinner. Guests: Stanley Fafara as Whitey Whitney.
134	17	"Beaver's Secret Life"	Norman Abbott	Wilton Schiller and Joe Connelly & Bob Mosher	January 21, 1961	13269
Beaver wants to be a writer when he grows up and Ward suggests he keep a journal. So, his parents give him a diary. Ward tells Beaver that no one would read it without his permission. Beaver records his daily activities in his journal, then begins to elaborate in fanciful ways. When Beaver doesn't come home for supper, Ward and June read his journal looking for clues to his whereabouts. They are shocked and concerned about Beaver's adventures. Ward and June wonder how they can confront Beaver about the stories without letting him know they read his diary. Ward eventually admits to Beaver that they read his diary. Beaver is impressed that his father can pick a lock. Beaver admits they are just stories, and Ward says he was too quick to believe them. Guests: Sue Randall as Miss Landers, Richard Correll as Richard Rickover, Stephen Talbot as Gilbert Bates, Karen Sue Trent as Penny Woods, Keith Taylor as Harry.
135	18	"Wally's Track Meet"	Norman Abbott	Joe Connelly & Bob Mosher	January 28, 1961	13270
The track coach warns the team against any roughhousing before the next meet. Wally is suspended from the track team for a week after a towel fight in the locker room, initiated by Eddie and Lumpy. Ward and June are concerned. Beaver learns the truth about the fight and asks Lumpy to confess because the team will lose the upcoming track meet without Wally. Lumpy confesses; but, rather than reinstating Wally, the coach suspends Eddie and Lumpy. Ward tells Wally that if you don't learn the rules when you are a kid, you may never learn them at all. Wally has learned a hard lesson. Guests: Ken Osmond as Eddie Haskell, Frank Bank as Lumpy Rutherford, Richard Deacon as Fred Rutherford, Richard Correll as Richard Rickover, John Close as Coach Henderson, Harold T. Daye as Track Team Member, Tom Jackman as Student.
136	19	"Beaver's Old Buddy"	Norman Abbott	Dick Conway & Roland MacLane and Joe Connelly & Bob Mosher	February 4, 1961	13271
Beaver is excited about having an old friend named Jackie Waters stay for the weekend and plans activities around all the things they once enjoyed doing. However, the boys find they have little in common any longer and grow bored with each other's company. Jackie decides to end the visit and calls his parents to pick him up. Ward consoles Beaver over his disappointment and tells him everyone goes through such an experience. Guests: Gary Hunley as Jackie Waters, Ray Kellogg as Mr. Waters, Shirley Rastatter as Mrs. Waters.
137	20	"Beaver's Tonsils"	Norman Abbott	Theodore and Mathilde Ferro and Joe Connelly & Bob Mosher	February 11, 1961	13272
Wally says Beaver has spent a restless night, but he couldn't tell whether Beaver was groaning or singing the theme from Wyatt Earp. June determines that Beaver is sick and his tonsils are inflamed. The doctor visits and the possibility of surgery is raised. Richard manages to frighten Beaver, when he delivers Beaver's homework, telling of tonsils being "yanked out", mimicking a noisy apparatus used when he saw Paladin perform an operation, and looking appalled at the sight of Beaver's throat. When June tells of Beaver's change of mood, Ward boosts his morale with stories of his own operation, telling of the attention and ice cream he'd received. Beaver now looks forward to the operation and arranges with friends to visit and bring gifts. But the doctor then decides Beaver's tonsils should remain where they are. Beaver is crestfallen over the turn of events, but his parents buy him a telescope to assuage his disappointment. Guests: Ken Osmond as Eddie Haskell, Richard Correll as Richard Rickover, Karen Sue Trent as Penny Woods, Burt Mustin as Gus the Fireman, Keith Taylor as Harry, John Gallaudet as Dr. Kirby, Jimmy Carter as Student (Herman, although not addressed as such).
138	21	"The Big Fish Count"	Norman Abbott	Dick Conway & Roland MacLane and Joe Connelly & Bob Mosher	February 18, 1961	13273
Eddie tries to put the best face on his seeking employment to pay for his father's electric razor he dropped while trying to carve a blaze on a suede jacket with it. The pet store where Eddie becomes employed holds a fish-counting contest; a pedigree Collie puppy, years shy of rescuing people on TV, is the grand prize. Gilbert and Beaver try to count the fish after school, but it is very difficult to keep track. When Eddie stops by and makes it clear he's in the know, Gilbert thinks they should get Eddie to tell Wally the number while they just listen. Beaver thinks that wrong and goes to Ward, hoping Ward's conscience has a better idea. But Ward says cheating is wrong and just entering the contest can be accomplishment enough. Lumpy does learn the number of fish from Eddie, tells a girl he's trying to impress, and it "gets away from him". The pet store owner is then confronted by a crowd of children who all have the correct count. He fires Eddie. Beaver wins a "constellation" prize—a pair of goldfish. Beaver wonders why fish don't drown. Wally says usually they have gills, except whales, who lost their hands and feet going back into the water two million years ago. Beaver will remind his mother that the next time he's told to take a bath. Guests: Ken Osmond as Eddie Haskell, Frank Bank as Lumpy Rutherford, Stephen Talbot as Gilbert Bates, Jess Kirkpatrick (as Jesse Kirkpatrick) as Mr. Parker, Karen Sue Trent as Penny Woods, Carol Wakefield as Cathy Maddox, Jennie Lynn as Sally Ann Maddox. June is actually seen vacuuming while wearing a string of pearls in this episode.
139	22	"Beaver's Poster"	Norman Abbott	Story by : Ellis Marcus; Teleplay by : Joe Connelly & Bob Mosher	February 25, 1961	13275
Beaver finds an old sketchbook of Ward's in the attic. The work is impressive, and June says Ward could have been a professional artist. At school, students are asked to volunteer to make visual displays relating to the Colonial Period. Beaver volunteers to supply one of three posters, the best to win a prize, knowing that his father will do a great job. After Ward says fathers would do almost anything for their families, he refuses to do the poster, other than to offer encouragement and to suggest Paul Revere as a theme. Beaver's own attempt at creating a poster is disastrous, with almost as much paint winding up on his shirt, and with Revere on horseback looking like a "guy rasslin' a pig"; but he enters his work at school anyway. Miss Landers suggests the posters be judged on their originality; and, because Penny and Gilbert admit to having had plenty of help, Beaver's poster easily wins. He gives the prize to Ward for not helping him. Guests: Sue Randall as Miss Landers, Stephen Talbot as Gilbert Bates, Karen Sue Trent as Penny Woods, Keith Taylor as Harry, Patty Turner as Linda Dennison, Lei Lani Sorenson as Phyllis, Betty Lynn Budzak as Student, Jimmy Carter as Herman (uncredited).
140	23	"Mother's Helper"	Norman Abbott	Dick Conway & Roland MacLane and Joe Connelly & Bob Mosher	March 4, 1961	13274
June calls housekeeper Mrs. Manners for help. Mrs. Manners is busy with other clients and sends her daughter, Margie. Wally becomes smitten and hangs around the kitchen every day to help Margie. Ward thinks their interest in each other is perfectly normal. However, June is concerned with Wally's infatuation and how it's interfering with his schoolwork. She calls Mrs. Manners to straighten things out. When Wally comes home from school one day and heads to the kitchen to help Margie, he finds Mrs. Manners instead. Guests: Candy Moore as Margie Manners, Mary Carroll as Mrs. Manners.
141	24	"The Dramatic Club"	Dann Cahn	Joe Connelly & Bob Mosher	March 11, 1961	13267
Wally has just become a "three-letter" man, and the family encourages Beaver to become more involved in extra-curricular activities at school. Beaver decides to try out for the Dramatic Club, although his previous acting experience was as a tree in kindergarten. Gilbert fails the audition by giggling through "Incident of the French Camp", but Richard does ventriloquism, Vickie recites "Foreign Children", Harry "Casey at the Bat", and Penny—a budding Shirley Temple—sings an adaptation of "Buffalo Gals". So, Beaver, reciting "Concord Hymn" against such stiff competition, is thrilled when he's cast as the lead in the play, "The Little Dutch Boy". Reading the script, he then discovers to his horror he must kiss a girl onstage. He refuses to participate and locks himself in the bathroom. At school, Vickie, the girl in the play, says she is repulsed with the idea of kissing him. They agree to do the kiss because the show must go on. Beaver will pretend he's kissing Uncle Billy. After the performance, Beaver says he'll never enjoy kissing girls as much as Wally does. Guests: Sue Randall as Miss Landers, Stephen Talbot as Gilbert Bates, Karen Sue Trent as Penny Woods, Keith Taylor as Harry, Richard Correll as Richard Rickover, Katharine Warren as Mrs. Prescott, Betty Lynn Budzak as Victoria 'Vickie' Bennett.
142	25	"Wally and Dudley"	Hugh Beaumont	George Tibbles	March 18, 1961	13276
June's dear friend Ruth and her husband have moved into the neighborhood, and June volunteers Wally to accompany Ruth's son Dudley to school and show him around. Meanwhile, Beaver tells Ward that because there weren't enough girls in the soprano section of the chorus, he and another boy had to sing in the section with the girls. The next morning, Dudley shows up way overdressed and way too polite. Ward, who has misgivings about the arrangement, suggests that at least the funereal, brimmed hat be left behind, but June won't hear of it. Wally tries to steer them away from the danger of encountering Eddie and Lumpy, but Dudley is not to be clued in so easily. Eddie gets Dudley invited to a party, where Eddie and Lumpy plan to embarrass him. Although Wally doesn't condone Eddie's prank, Wally feels Dudley brings many of these problems onto himself. The boys don't know that Dudley has a hidden talent that will help him break the ice with new friends. When the hi-fi fails, Dudley becomes the center of attention of an appreciative crowd with his expert piano playing. Guests: Ken Osmond as Eddie Haskell, Jimmy Hawkins as Dudley McMillan, Frank Bank as Lumpy Rutherford, Marta Kristen as Christine Staples, Pamela Baird as Mary Ellen Rogers (as Pamela Beaird), Ed Pagett as Danny.
143	26	"Eddie Spends the Night"	Norman Abbott	Dick Conway & Roland MacLane and Joe Connelly & Bob Mosher	March 25, 1961	13278
Wally owes Eddie a sleepover, so Eddie is to spend the weekend at the Cleavers. A fight between Eddie and Wally, over accusations of cheating at chess, may do more than just end the stayover. It might expose some of Eddie's well-hidden personal secrets. Eddie leaves abruptly saying the boys were mean to him. Ward learns Eddie's parents are out of town and Eddie is "edgy" when having to stay home alone. Ward and Wally find Eddie at home with all the lights on and persuade him to return to the house. Eddie pretends to tell his dad that he's going back to the Cleaver's house. The next morning, Eddie, in appreciation of being invited back, volunteers to help with the dishes and actually does much of the work. Later, he admits to Beaver the difficulty of being a bigshot when you're by yourself. Beaver tells June that he saw another side of Eddie, but it didn't last long. Guests: Ken Osmond as Eddie Haskell, John Alvin as Frank Haskell. Eddie's father was played by several different actors over the course of the series including Karl Swenson, George Petrie, and, in this episode, John Alvin. Eddie's father was 'George' in previous episodes and 'Frank' in this one. In a first season episode, Eddie tells a scoutmaster his name is 'Edward Clark Haskell, Jr.', suggesting, of course, that his father's name is 'Edward Clark Haskell, Sr.'.
144	27	"Beaver's Report Card"	Norman Abbott	Story by : Theodore and Mathilde Ferro; Teleplay by : Joe Connelly & Bob Mosher	April 1, 1961	13277
Beaver is having trouble with dividing fractions in arithmetic, his worst subject, especially when there's "a lot of junk left over". When report cards are passed out Beaver has had to leave school early for the dentist. So, Gilbert delivers Beaver's report card to Lumpy and Eddie, who are visiting the Cleaver house, while Wally changes his clothes. Eddie changes Beaver's 'D minus' in math to 'B plus'. Later, Ward and June discover the card and are thrilled with the mark. Ward buys Beaver a new aircraft model he's wanted. June learns from Miss Landers Beaver actually received a 'D minus'. Beaver denies tampering with his report card, but his parents are disbelieving. Wally suspects what has happened and goes to see Eddie, who phones Ward with the truth. Ward promises to ban Eddie from the Cleaver house if he ever pulls a stunt like that again. Ward apologizes to Beaver for not believing him, but Beaver still doesn't get to keep the model airplane, because of his poor grade. Guests: Sue Randall as Miss Landers, Ken Osmond as Eddie Haskell, Stephen Talbot as Gilbert Bates, Frank Bank as Lumpy Rutherford.
145	28	"Mistaken Identity"	Norman Abbott	Joe Connelly & Bob Mosher	April 8, 1961	13280
Ward has just been invited on a committee to oversee a youth center. Meanwhile, Richard and Gilbert invite Beaver to go check out an abandoned house with them, but Beaver declines to go. When they get there, Richard throws a rock, and breaks one of the windows, but is caught by the police. Richard gives Beaver's name as an alias to the police. In the evening, Ward thinks the courtesy call from a police lieutenant who is also on the committee, and the arresting officer, involves the committee's work. He is astonished to learn they are there in response to his son's breaking the law. Beaver is called down, excited at meeting the police, and the arresting officer realizes he's not the boy involved in the incident. Beaver is pretty certain that it was Richard, but he doesn't want to "squeal" on him, but upon learning the difference between squealing and telling the truth, he admits what he knows. Richard escapes a break in his friendship with Beaver by apologizing at the first opportunity. Guests: Stephen Talbot as Gilbert Bates, Richard Correll as Richard Rickover, Alan Hewitt as Lieutenant Barnes, Marvin Bryan as Officer Medford.
146	29	"Wally's Dream Girl"	Norman Abbott	Katherine and Dale Eunson	April 15, 1961	13279
The popular new girl at school, Ginny Townsend, recently arrived from Indianapolis, has Wally dreaming about romance, including being found by June dreamily listening to a classical music record. Ward and June know that he has a crush on someone, but don't know who. Beaver lets it slip to June that the girl in question is Ginny. Wally is too shy to ask her out so June calls her mother and invites the girl to a picnic at Friend's Lake. On the outing, Wally discovers his dream girl is allergic to chicken and breaks out in lumps in the sunshine. Later, June apologizes for meddling but Wally is glad she did and thanks her. Wally later tells Eddie he doesn't want a sunburned allergic dream girl with lumps. Guests: Ken Osmond as Eddie Haskell, Linda Bennett as Ginny Townsend. The familiar classical music Wally listens to while feeling passionate is the "Rose Adagio" from Tchaikovsky's The Sleeping Beauty ballet.
147	30	"The School Picture"	Norman Abbott	Story by : Joe Connelly & Bob Mosher; Teleplay by : Dick Conway & Roland MacLane	April 22, 1961	13281
Through a series of delays, Beaver's class is the last to be photographed for the yearbook. Meanwhile, Wally trades with Eddie for a walkie-talkie that doesn't work and he tries to fix it. Gilbert goads Beaver into making a funny face with him in the picture, but when the photo is snapped, Beaver goes through with it, but Gilbert doesn't. The photographer doesn't notice at the time, and when Mrs. Rayburn spots Beaver's funny face in the photographer's proofs it's too late to re-shoot. She calls Ward to come to the school, to inform him of Beaver's stunt. At home, June is especially disappointed, as she had planned to send copies of the photo to relatives, like Aunt Martha and Uncle Billy. Ward explains to Beaver that his act was very disrespectful and will cause a lot of shame and embarrassment for both himself, his parents, Miss Landers, Mrs. Rayburn, and his whole class and their parents, and grounds him for it. Thankfully, when the yearbook is published, the photographer has airbrushed the photo and Beaver's face is hidden behind a classmate's large hair ribbon, saving the picture. Guests: Sue Randall as Miss Landers, Stephen Talbot as Gilbert Bates, Karen Sue Trent as Penny Woods, Doris Packer as Mrs. Cornelia Rayburn, Lenore Kingston as Mrs. Bruce, Gage Clarke as Mr. Baxter, Keith Taylor as Harry, Ken Osmond as Eddie Haskell (voice only - uncredited).
148	31	"Beaver's Rat"	Hugh Beaumont	Joe Connelly & Bob Mosher	April 29, 1961	13285
Beaver keeps getting bum deals whenever he makes trades with friends and his latest has given him a pet rat, for which he has paid fifty cents. Ward would like Beaver to get rid of the rat. He then sells the rat to Violet Rutherford for three dollars. Fred visits Ward and tells him Beaver pulled a fast one on his daughter. Beaver returns the three dollars and regains the rat. Fred later offers five dollars for the rat because his wife had grown fond him. Beaver accepts only his original fifty cent investment and asks his father why Mr. Rutherford would make such an offer. Ward says we're never too old to do "goofy stuff". Guests: Frank Bank as Lumpy Rutherford, Richard Deacon as Fred Rutherford, Veronica Cartwright as Violet Rutherford.
149	32	"In the Soup"	Norman Abbott	Story by : Dick Conway, Roland MacLane; Teleplay by : Joe Connelly, Bob Mosher	May 6, 1961	13287
Wally would like to have his first teen party at his house and he hopes Beaver doesn't do anything to ruin it. Beaver is going to spend the night at Whitey's house the night of the party. On the way to Whitey's house, the boys see a billboard in the neighborhood that displays a picture of a woman holding a three-dimensional cup of steaming Zesto Soup. Whitey urges Beaver to climb up to the cup to discover how the steam is produced. Beaver falls into the cup and can't get out. Whitey hurries home to tell his parents. Curious onlookers gather with Ward, Wally and his friends among them. Eventually the fire department arrives to rescue Beaver. Ward still lets Beaver stay at Whitey's house. Ward hopes Beaver will not take a reckless dare again. Guests: Ken Osmond as Eddie Haskell, Frank Bank as Lumpy Rutherford, Stanley Fafara as Whitey Whitney, Harry Holcombe as Frank Whitney, Lenore Kingston as Mrs. Whitney, Jack Mann as Fireman, Jimmy Gaines as Little Boy. Jerry Mathers in his memoirs ...And Jerry Mathers as The Beaver recalls this being the most expensively produced episode in the series.
150	33	"Community Chest"	Norman Abbott	Raphael Blau, Joe Connelly & Bob Mosher	May 13, 1961	13284
June plans to go collecting for the Community Chest but there is a conflict with an open house at Wally's school she must attend. Beaver volunteers to collect. June doubts he can do it, but Ward thinks it'll be good experience. Beaver takes Gilbert along for support. After a rocky start, they do well and sit licking ice cream cones on a bench outside the drugstore, when the collection can falls out of Beaver's pocket, only noticed later when Gilbert asks why Beaver has stopped "jingling" while they walk home. At home, Ward says he will replace the money if Beaver goes to every house he visited and records the exact donations made. People gladly contribute again when they realize Beaver lost the original donations. In the meantime, the collection can has been found and returned. Ward tells Beaver people should be given the chance to return the second collections because they gave only after hearing about his loss. Ward then decides he will make the calls, by phone, because he can't ask his son to do what he himself is unwilling to. Guests: Stephen Talbot as Gilbert Bates, Dorothy Neumann as Older Neighbor, Lee Meriwether as Young Neighbor, Claudia Bryar as Mrs. Hirsch, Bruno VeSota as Angry Neighbor.
151	34	"Junior Fire Chief"	Norman Abbott	Bill Manhoff , Dick Conway & Roland MacLane and Joe Connelly & Bob Mosher	May 20, 1961	13288
Miss Landers announces a fire prevention project that includes electing a class junior fire chief. Everyone seems to be in the running for the position except Beaver, who doesn't like being a big shot. When Beaver's family encourages him to run, his class elects him. Then Beaver plays the role to the hilt, citing his family and neighbors for various violations. He brags to Gus the fireman about his progress, prompting Gus to remark that Beaver has yelled at more people in two days than Gus has in many years, which he did not enjoy doing. Gus advises Beaver that being a fire chief is like being an educator of fire safety, and that yelling at others, will only make them defensive, but being nice will earn their respect and trust. Beaver realizes the truth of Gus' words and reports to the class that he has torn up the citations he gave, conveying Gus's wisdom in his own words. Beaver has learned a lesson and Miss Landers is proud of the junior fire chief. Guests: Sue Randall as Miss Landers, Burt Mustin as Gus the Fireman, Stephen Talbot as Gilbert Bates, Richard Correll as Richard Rickover, Karen Sue Trent as Penny Woods, Keith Taylor as Harry, Stanley Fafara as Whitey Whitney.
152	35	"Beaver's Frogs"	Norman Abbott	Lou Breslow and Joseph Hoffman	May 27, 1961	13282
Beaver wants to buy a used canoe for $25, when new ones cost $200. Ward says he'll pay one half if Beaver can earn the other half, thinking that's nearly impossible, not really wanting Beaver to have the canoe. So, Beaver needs money. The want-ads aren't much help and Beaver thinks child labor laws keep kids from doing a lot of neat stuff. But Richard, for a ride in the canoe, tells Beaver he knows a man who buys live frogs for 25 cents apiece. Beaver, with Wally, collects many frogs at Miller's Pond, keeps them at home, and winds up with enough for his half of the canoe. Then Richard says the frogs will be killed and used in experiments. Beaver has grown fond of his frogs and returns them to the pond. Later, Ward tells Beaver he can earn money by waxing his car, but Beaver is told by Wally that the car doesn't even need polishing. Beaver appreciates his father's kindness. Guests: Richard Correll as Richard Rickover, Stephen Talbot as Gilbert Bates, Rory Stevens as Chuckie Murdock.
153	36	"Beaver Goes in Business"	Norman Abbott	Dick Conway & Roland MacLane and Joe Connelly & Bob Mosher	June 3, 1961	13258
Beaver and Gilbert start a lawn mowing business, but the first neighbors they ask have ongoing arrangements for getting their lawns done. Eddie, giving the boys "the business", suggests they mow lawns then ask for payment. Beaver and Gilbert clumsily mow a lawn without permission and the homeowner becomes angry. Gilbert quits; he plans to get a newspaper route and have his father deliver the papers. Beaver is encouraged at home by the story of Robert the Bruce and the spider. Beaver then finds a woman whose husband is away, mows her lawn, and gets a five dollar check that bounces. Beaver thought she was a nice lady and his faith in adults is sorely tried. Ward says you must trust people and you must also trust your judgment of people. Ward calls the homeowner, who made a mistake, apologizes, and reimburses Beaver with cash. Beaver's faith is restored, while Wally checks the $5 bill for signs of counterfeiting. Guests: Ken Osmond as Eddie Haskell, Stephen Talbot as Gilbert Bates, Amzie Strickland as Woman, Jim Nolan as First Man, William Stevens as Second Man.
154	37	"Kite Day"	Norman Abbott	Story by : Katherine & Dale Eunson; Teleplay by : Joe Connelly & Bob Mosher	June 10, 1961	13286
Ward and Beaver build an elaborate kite kit for a special father-and-son event. They are up against knowledgeable competition, as Gilbert boasts his dad is an electrical engineer, and Richard that his father flew a P-38 fighter in the war. However, Beaver, this time, is in it to win. After the kite is built, Gilbert persuades Beaver to give it a trial flight. The kite crashes and is ruined. Beaver hides the kite and hopes the event will be cancelled, going so far as to ask a reputed Indian to teach him a rain dance. Ward finds out, however, and chastises Beaver for his carelessness. Beaver and his father could attend the event with what they have; but Beaver doesn't want that, because every kid wants his father to be the greatest. They buy another, ready-made kite, attend the event, and bring home a prize ribbon. Guests: Stanley Fafara as Whitey Whitney, Richard Correll as Richard Rickover, Stephen Talbot as Gilbert Bates, Jason Robards Sr. as Mr. Henderson, Keith Taylor as Harry. June places her origins in East St. Louis. Gilbert's father is said to be an electrical engineer; in the first episode in which he appeared he described his job as a professional traveling musician. Final episode for would-be Larry Mondello replacement Harry Harrison.
155	38	"Beaver's Doll Buggy"	Anton M. Leader	Dick Conway & Roland MacLane and Joe Connelly & Bob Mosher	June 17, 1961	13289
Beaver has purchased a wheel-less coaster car from Eddie, who had meant to turn it into an ice boat until his father ran over it, perhaps intentionally. Beaver takes Penny Woods up on her standing offer of the wheels from her old doll buggy. But Beaver forgets his tools when he goes to Penny's house to remove the wheels. Beaver pushes the buggy through the streets of Mayfield, feeling self-conscious, as people stare at such a strange sight and make sarcastic remarks. He takes a more roundabout route. When he's missed, calls are made. The Cleavers find out Beaver's pushing a doll buggy, and they worry for his safety. Beaver spots Richard and Gilbert heading his way, and he shoves the buggy into a weedy ditch. Gilbert finds it and claims the wheels for his own cart. Beaver doesn't have the nerve to tell him the wheels are his. Eddie reveals to Wally that his similar experience was being sent to school with a perm, which is why he likes making other people look like goons first. Ward buys Beaver the wheels he needs. Beaver finds it hard to be too nasty to Penny, and Gilbert tells Beaver he's going flaky. Guests: Stephen Talbot as Gilbert Bates, Richard Correll as Richard Rickover, Ken Osmond as Eddie Haskell, Karen Sue Trent as Penny Woods, Jean Vander Pyl as Mrs. Woods, Jennie Lynn as Patty Ann Maddox, Mike Mahoney as Man in the Street.
156	39	"Substitute Father"	David Butler	Joe Connelly & Bob Mosher	June 24, 1961	13290
Ward is getting a taxi to the airport for a trip to St. Louis, wearing an overcoat and hat. On the doorstep Ward leaves Wally as the man of the house. Wally takes being man of the house seriously while Ward is away, telling a shocked Beaver to, "clean out your ears, you little pig". At school, Gilbert boasts of an important hat-wearing trip his father took. As they leave, Beaver is tripped by another kid and falls. He gets up and calls the kid a name that is drowned out by the school bell. However, Miss Landers hears it and is truly shocked at Beaver's language. The bully that tripped Beaver goes unpunished. Beaver stays after school and is sent home with a note. Miss Landers tells him to bring one of his parents into school to speak to her. Beaver doesn't want to repeat the word to his mother so Wally goes to the school in Ward's stead. Miss Landers accepts Wally as Beaver's substitute father, after Beaver tells her how Wally got him to behave in church. Beaver promises never to use bad words again. At home, Beaver thanks Wally for being a good brother and a good father. June, told what happened, as long as she didn't ask about what was really said, tells Ward to bring home something special for Wally, "let's just say for carving the roast beef so well". Guests: Sue Randall as Miss Landers, Ken Osmond as Eddie Haskell, Richard Correll as Richard Rickover, Stephen Talbot as Gilbert Bates, Stanley Fafara as Whitey Whitney, Fred Sherman as Taxi Driver.
