= Madge Blake =

American actress (1899–1969)

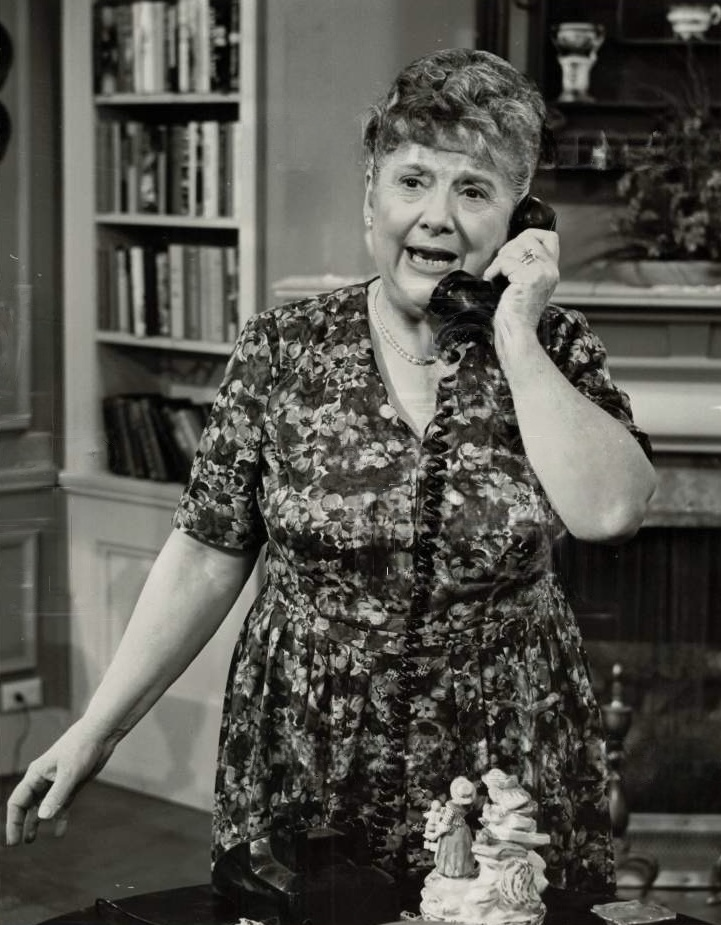
- Blake in The Joey Bishop Show (1961)
- Born: Madge Cummings; May 31, 1899; Kinsley, Kansas, U.S.
- Died: February 19, 1969 (aged 69); Pasadena, California, U.S.
- Resting place: Grand View Memorial Park Cemetery
- Occupation: Actress
- Years active: 1946–1969
- Spouse: James Lincoln Blake
- Children: 2
- Relatives: Milburn Stone (first cousin), Fred Stone (uncle)

Madge Blake (née Cummings; May 31, 1899 – February 19, 1969) was an American character actress best remembered for her role as Larry Mondello's mother, Margaret Mondello, on the CBS/ABC sitcom Leave It to Beaver, as Flora MacMichael on the ABC/CBS sitcom The Real McCoys, and as Aunt Harriet Cooper in 96 episodes of ABC's Batman. Gene Kelly had a special affection for her and included her in each of his films following her role in An American in Paris.

== Early life ==
During World War II, Madge Blake and her husband, James Lincoln Blake, worked in Utah helping construct detonators for the atomic bomb and testing equipment used in the Manhattan Project. In recognition of their contributions, the U.S. government awarded the couple a citation.

Blake was a first cousin of actor Milburn Stone, who played the role of Doc Adams on Gunsmoke Western series.

== Acting career ==
She did not begin to study acting until she was 50 years old, when she enrolled at the Pasadena Playhouse and took advantage of whatever influence or contacts Milburn Stone had to land acting roles.

Blake portrayed gushy gossip columnist Dora Bailey in Singin' in the Rain (1952). In the mid-1950s, she appeared on Rod Cameron's City Detective and in Ray Milland's sitcom Meet Mr. McNutley, renamed in the second season as The Ray Milland Show. Blake appeared in four episodes of the NBC sitcom It's a Great Life (1954–1956) and twice on CBS's December Bride, with Spring Byington. In 1958, she appeared in "The Fountain of Youth", a Peabody Award-winning episode of the NBC anthology series Colgate Theatre. She also was a model for one of the fairies (Fauna) in Walt Disney's animated version film Sleeping Beauty (1959).

She appeared as Mrs. Porter, a babysitter, in the 1959 pilot of CBS's Dennis the Menace. About this time, she was cast in a guest-starring role in the sitcoms Guestward, Ho!, with Joanne Dru on ABC, and Angel, with Annie Fargé on CBS.

Between 1957 and 1963, Blake had a recurring role as Flora MacMichael, the romantic interest of Walter Brennan's Grandpa Amos McCoy on The Real McCoys, a sitcom about a mountain family that relocated to Southern California. In 1960, she guest-starred in "Tom Cuts Off the Credit", the premiere episode of the sitcom The Tom Ewell Show. The following year, she guest-starred in the episode "A View of Murder" of the syndicated crime drama The Brothers Brannagan.

Before her role on Batman, she had a recurring role on The Jack Benny Program as the president of the Jack Benny Fan Club - Pasadena Chapter. She played Millie Brinkerhoff in the episode "Instant Wedding" in the 1963 NBC military drama The Lieutenant starring Gary Lockwood in the title role, and Larry Mondello's mother on Leave It to Beaver. Blake appeared in the pilot episode of The Addams Family (broadcast in the U.S in September 1964) as Miss Comstock, an official from the Addams' children's school. Blake also appeared in a memorable episode of I Love Lucy in 1957 with George Reeves guest-starring as Superman and in an earlier episode in 1954 as store clerk Mrs. Mulford. She played the mother of Joey Barnes on The Joey Bishop Show from 1961 to 1964. At one point, the producers of Batman wanted to fire Blake for unknown reasons. Adam West, with whom she had become friends, stood up for her and she kept her job. The next day, he found a freshly baked cake in his dressing room.

== Declining health and death ==
Declining health caused Blake's role as Aunt Harriet to be reduced, and with the introduction of Batgirl in the third and final season of Batman, she appeared in only two episodes that season in a guest role. Shortly before her death, she appeared as Mrs. Hardy in the episode "The Con Man" of the CBS sitcom The Doris Day Show.

Blake was admitted to Huntington Memorial Hospital where she died at age 69, the result of a heart attack. She was interred beside her mother in the family plot at Grand View Memorial Park Cemetery.

== Filmography ==
- Two Sisters from Boston (1946) as Opera Chorus Member (uncredited)
- Adam's Rib (1949) as Mrs. Bonner, Adam's Mother (uncredited)
- A Life of Her Own (1950) as Regent Studios' Wardrobe Woman (uncredited)
- Between Midnight and Dawn (1950) as Mrs. Mallory
- M (1951) as Police Station Witness (uncredited)
- The Prowler (1951) as Martha Gilvray
- No Questions Asked (1951) as Mrs. Brent, Ellen's Landlady (uncredited)
- Queen for a Day (1951) as Mrs. Kimpel, High Diver segment
- An American in Paris (1951) as Edna Mae Bestram (uncredited)
- Rhubarb (1951) as Mrs. Emily Thompson (uncredited)
- Little Egypt (1951)
- A Millionaire for Christy (1951) as Mrs. Rapello (scenes deleted)
- Finders Keepers (1952)
- Singin' in the Rain (1952) as Dora Bailey (uncredited)
- Skirts Ahoy! (1952) as Mrs. Jane Vance (uncredited)
- Washington Story (1952) as Woman Bystander (uncredited)
- It Grows on Trees (1952) as Woman (uncredited)
- Something for the Birds (1952) as Mrs. J.L. Chadwick
- The Iron Mistress (1952) as Mrs. Cuny (uncredited)
- The Bad and the Beautiful (1952) as Mrs. Rosser (uncredited)
- It Happens Every Thursday (1953) as Clubwoman (uncredited)
- The Band Wagon (1953) as Investor (uncredited)
- Dangerous Crossing (1953) as Ship's Passenger at Purser's Office (uncredited)
- The Long, Long Trailer (1953) as Aunt Anastacia
- Rhapsody (1954) as Mrs. Cahill
- Fireman Save My Child (1954) as Mrs. Spencer - Fire Commissioner's Wife
- Brigadoon (1954) as Mrs. McIntosh (uncredited)
- Ricochet Romance (1954) as Dowager (uncredited)
- Athena (1954) as Mrs. Smith (uncredited)
- Ain't Misbehavin' (1955) as Mrs. Hildegarde Grier (uncredited)
- The Private War of Major Benson (1955) as Woman at Airport (uncredited)
- It's Always Fair Weather (1955)as Mrs. Stamper (uncredited)
- The Tender Trap (1955) as Society Reporter (uncredited)
- Glory (1956) as Aunt Martha (uncredited)
- Please Murder Me (1956) as Jenny (uncredited)
- The Solid Gold Cadillac (1956) as Commentator on TV (uncredited)
- You Can't Run Away from It (1956) as Proprietor's Wife (uncredited)
- Leave it to Beaver (1957-1960) as Mrs. Mondelo (Larry Mondelo's mother)
- Kelly and Me (1957) as Stout Woman (uncredited)
- All Mine to Give (1957) as Woman who opens door (uncredited)
- Designing Woman (1957) as Party Guest (uncredited)
- Loving You (1957) as Hired Agitator (uncredited)
- The Restless Gun (1957) as Emily Davis in Episode "The Gold Buckle"
- The Heart Is a Rebel (1958) as Mrs. Carlson
- Please Don't Eat the Daisies (1960) as Mrs. Kilkinny (scenes deleted)
- Bells Are Ringing (1960) as Woman on Street (uncredited)
- Sergeants 3 (1962) as Mrs. Parent (uncredited)
- Looking for Love (1964) as Mrs. Press (uncredited)
- Bewitched (1964) as Mary in Episode "The Witches Are Out"
- Joy in the Morning (1965) as Miss Vi (uncredited)
- The Trouble with Angels (1966) as Exasperated Lady on Train (uncredited)
- The Last of the Secret Agents? (1966) as Middle-Aged Lady at Topless a Go-Go (uncredited)
- Batman (1966) as Aunt Harriet Cooper
- Follow Me, Boys! (1966) as Cora Anderson (uncredited)
- Mannix (1967) as Muriel Pochek in episode "Turn Every Stone" (uncredited)
