= Larry Mondello =

Fictional character

- Robert "Rusty" Stevens as Larry Mondello.
- First appearance: "Beaver's Crush" (November 22, 1957)
- Last appearance: "Family Scrapbook" (1963)
- Portrayed by: Rusty Stevens

In-universe information
- Gender: Male
- Family: Unknown (father); Margaret Mondello (mother); Unknown (sister); Unknown (brother); Unknown (little brother)

Larry Mondello is a fictional character from the American television series Leave It to Beaver (1957–1963). He is portrayed by child actor Robert "Rusty" Stevens. Larry Mondello appears in 68 of the show's 234 episodes over the first few seasons. Although Larry is mentioned in the premiere episode, "Beaver Gets 'Spelled", it is not until the eighth episode, "Beaver's Crush", that he actually makes an appearance.

== Description ==
Larry is Theodore "Beaver" Cleaver's chubby, not very bright classmate and fair-weather best friend distinguished for his apple-eating, candy bar-munching habits. Larry has a knack for leading Beaver astray and getting him into trouble, then running away and abandoning Beaver to face the consequences by himself.

Larry's mother, Margaret (portrayed by Madge Blake), is a nervous, exasperated parent, whose husband is so perennially out-of-town on business, the phrase "If your father were home . . ." comes out of her mouth, at some point, in almost every episode in which she appears. Mrs. Mondello sometimes takes Larry to Beaver's father for discipline. Larry's father makes one brief appearance, however; he is seen talking to Larry backstage in the second-season episode, "School Play". Larry has older siblings: an unseen married brother, and an unmarried, unseen, and unattractive (according to Larry) 18-year-old sister (age mentioned in the third season) who lives at home. A little brother was mentioned only once, in the 1958 episode "Beaver and Henry," but never seen. In one episode, Mrs. Mondello catches Larry and Beaver reading Larry's sister's diary. Reports from various characters on the show indicate Larry's home life is one of "hollering" and physical punishments.

Larry and Beaver have an on-again/off-again relationship. The boys sometimes quarrel but make up when the clouds pass. They are in the same class together at Grant Avenue Grammar School and are forced to attend ballroom dance lessons at Miss Spencer's School of the Dance on Saturdays. In the first-season episode "Beaver's Short Pants", Larry taunts Beaver at school for having "girl's stockings" and calls him a "sissy" for wearing a formal short pants suit with kneesocks, provoking Beaver to punch Larry in the stomach. Larry runs away from home in one episode — but only as far as Beaver's bathroom where he sleeps in the bathtub. In another episode, Larry throws his mother's pin money out the window, picks it up later, and claims the money fell from an airplane.

According to some sources, actor Stevens left the show in 1960 when his family moved from Burbank, California, to Philadelphia, Pennsylvania. However, according to Barbara Billingsley (in her TV Archive interview), his character was written out because of his overly ambitious stage mother causing grief with the producers. This would tie in more closely with the fact that, post Leave It To Beaver, Stevens continued to get occasional roles in California-shot TV shows through 1963, before his career as a child actor came to a close. Stevens himself mentioned a third reason his career ended: he wanted to get out of the show to live a normal life as a normal kid.

Stevens reprised his role of Larry Mondello in the 1983 reunion telemovie, Still the Beaver, and appeared in three episodes of the subsequent series The New Leave It To Beaver.
