= Rusty Stevens =

American actor

- Rusty Stevens as Larry Mondello
- Born: Robert Stevens; 1948 (age 77–78)
- Occupation: Actor
- Years active: 1957–1963; 1983–1989
- Known for: Playing Larry Mondello on Leave It to Beaver

Robert "Rusty" Stevens (born 1948) is an American former child actor best remembered for his role as Larry Mondello, Beaver Cleaver's friend and classmate, in the original Leave It to Beaver television series. Stevens appeared in 67 of the show's 234 episodes, between 1957 and 1960.

== Career ==
Stevens had parts in some TV shows before and after he portrayed Larry Mondello in the sitcom Leave It to Beaver. Reportedly, he left the show in 1960 because his family moved from Burbank, California, to Philadelphia, Pennsylvania; however, Barbara Billingsley, who played June Cleaver on the series, said in a TV Archive interview that Stevens was fired because his overbearing stage mother caused grief for the producers of the series. After Leave It to Beaver, Stevens continued to get occasional roles in Hollywood-produced TV shows through 1963 (including My Three Sons, Perry Mason and The Rifleman), before his career as a child actor came to a close.

He briefly returned to acting when he reprised his role as Larry Mondello in the 1983 made-for-television reunion movie Still the Beaver. He also appeared in three episodes of the follow-up series The New Leave It to Beaver through 1989.

Stevens was able to join the cast for Still the Beaver, after Jerry Mathers, who portrayed Beaver Cleaver, tracked him down after searching for many years. At the time, he was working as a car-insurance salesman in New Jersey.

== Partial filmography ==
Year	Title	Role	Notes
1957–1960	Leave It to Beaver	Larry Mondello	68 episodes
1960	77 Sunset Strip	Max	Episode "The Attic"
1960	Shirley Temple's Storybook	Stuffy Cole and Gypsy Boy	Episodes "Little Men" and "Madeline"
1962	My Three Sons	Cletus Bleeker	Episode "Bub Gets A Job"
1962	Perry Mason	Brucie Hillman	Episode "The Case of the Dodging Domino"
1963	The Rifleman	Melvin	Episode "Hostages to Fortune"
1983	Still the Beaver	Larry Mondello	TV movie
1983–1989	The New Leave It to Beaver	Larry Mondello	3 episodes
