= Stephen Talbot =

American journalist (born 1949)

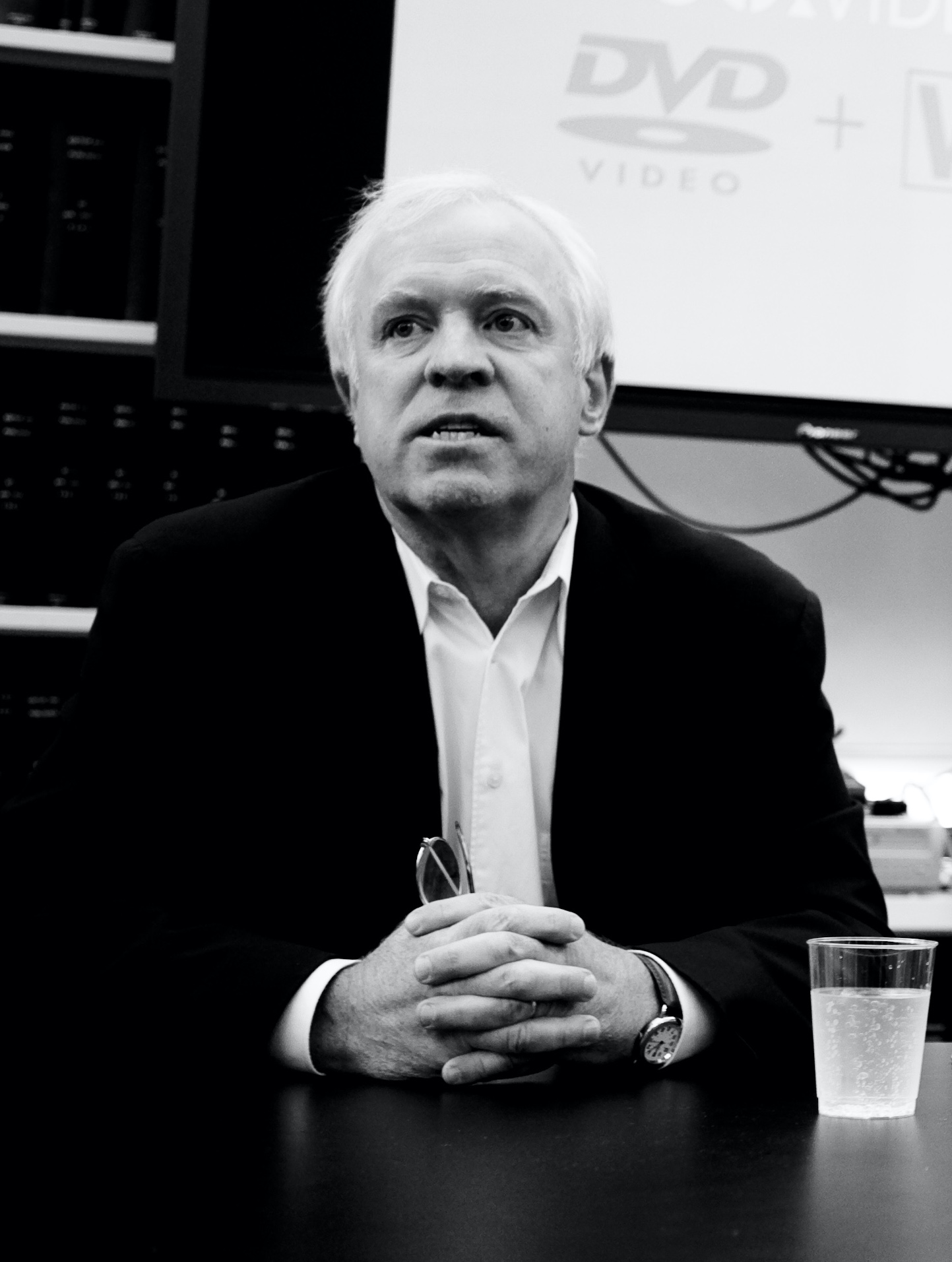
- Talbot at UC Berkeley in 2007
- Born: Stephen Henderson Talbot; February 28, 1949 (age 77); Los Angeles, California, United States
- Other name: Steve Talbot
- Spouse: Pippa Gordon
- Children: 2

Stephen Henderson Talbot (born February 28, 1949) is a documentary filmmaker and journalist. Talbot directed and produced "The Movement and the 'Madman' " for the PBS series American Experience in 2023. He is a longtime contributor to the Public Broadcasting Service (PBS), including over 16 years for the series Frontline. Talbot has won Emmys, Peabodys, DuPonts and a George Polk Award for his documentaries.

His latest film, "Last Christian in Bethlehem," concerns the plight of Palestinian Christians living under occupation in the West Bank.

Talbot's more than 40 documentaries include the Frontline films "The Best Campaign Money Can Buy", "Rush Limbaugh's America", "The Long March of Newt by Gingrich", "Spying on Saddam," "Justice for Sale", and "News War: What's Happening to the News". From 2002 to 2008, Talbot was the Series Editor of Frontline World, helping to commission and oversee stories for 31 broadcast episodes.

Talbot has also written and produced PBS biographies of writers Dashiell Hammett, Beryl Markham, Ken Kesey, Carlos Fuentes, Maxine Hong Kingston and John Dos Passos. He was co-creator and executive producer of the PBS music specials, Sound Tracks: Music Without Borders.

Before becoming a journalist and filmmaker, Talbot was a television child actor in the late 1950s and early 1960s. He is best known for his role in the TV sitcom Leave It to Beaver, in which he played Gilbert Bates, friend of Theodore "Beaver" Cleaver (Jerry Mathers).

== Early life and education ==
Born in Hollywood and raised in Studio City, California, Stephen Talbot is the son of film, stage and TV actor Lyle Talbot and Paula Talbot (born Margaret Epple). Stephen graduated in 1966 from Harvard Boys School in Studio City (now called Harvard-Westlake).

In 1970, he graduated from Wesleyan University in Connecticut, where he studied English and film and was also very active in anti-Vietnam War protests. He began making films about the anti-war movement, including the November 1969 March on Washington, DC III (about Vietnam Veterans Against the War), and Year of the Tiger (filmed in Vietnam).

From 1970 to 1973, he worked at the State University of New York College at Old Westbury, then an experimental college on Long Island. He began as assistant to the school's president John Maguire and subsequently became a lecturer in the American Studies program.

== Acting career ==
Talbot in a 1959 publicity shot

Talbot's first appearance as Gilbert on Leave It to Beaver was in a 1959 episode called "Beaver and Gilbert", in which he played an insecure new kid in town who is prone to telling tall tales. Over the next five years, he would appear in 57 episodes of the series, which ended in June 1963. The conniving Gilbert frequently got the hapless Beaver into trouble, once declaring, "I may be a dirty rat, but I'm not a dumb rat." In a signature episode, he tricked Beaver into making a face during a school picture. In perhaps his funniest role, he played the "mother" to Beaver's "father" as they pretended to take their kids for a drive in the Cleaver family car -- until it rolled down the driveway into the street. As the series developed, Gilbert became Beaver's best friend.

Talbot guest-starred on many television programs in the late 1950s and early 1960s, including three episodes of Lassie, "Growing Pains," "The Flying Machine," and "The Big Race." He appeared in two episodes of The Twilight Zone: "Static" and "The Fugitive". In 1960, he played Jimmie Kendall, son of the title character in CBS's Perry Mason in the episode, "The Case of the Wandering Widow".

Talbot appeared as well in Lawman, Sugarfoot, M Squad, The Barbara Stanwyck Show, The Blue Angels, Men Into Space, Wanted: Dead or Alive, Law of the Plainsman, The Donna Reed Show, Mr. Novak, and The Lucy Show. He performed in comedy sketches with Bob Newhart in the NBC variety program The Bob Newhart Show. Talbot also played the role of Ronnie Kramer in "I Hit and Ran", a 1960 episode of the CBS's anthology series The DuPont Show with June Allyson.

On stage in 1960, Talbot co-starred as "Sonny" in William Inge's Dark at the Top of the Stairs with Marjorie Lord at the La Jolla Playhouse.

He also played Dick Clark's ward and nephew in Clark's first movie, Because They're Young (1960). The high school melodrama also starred Tuesday Weld with music by Duane Eddy and James Darren.

Having spent his early years in front of the cameras, Talbot abandoned acting for a career as a journalist. In an article for Salon.com in 1997, he looked back with a sense of humor about his past role on Leave It to Beaver:

In the interests of historical accuracy I should say that, yes, Gilbert was a troublemaker and an occasional liar, but my character was certainly no Eddie Haskell – that leering teenage hypocrite who spoke unctuously to parents ("Well, hello Mrs. Cleaver, and how is young Theodore today?") and venomously to the Beav ("Hey, squirt, take a powder before I squash you like a bug").... I have spent my adult life trying to conceal my Leave It to Beaver past or correcting the historical record. Either way the series has become inescapable. When I was a kid, I loved acting; in fact, I badgered my father and mother until they allowed me to work. But how could I have known as an innocent 9-year-old that I was taking part in a television program that would live on for 40 years as an icon for baby boomers? In the early '80s, I turned down an offer to revive my role as Gilbert in a Beaver reunion series. "I'm trying to establish myself as a documentary filmmaker and an investigative reporter," I explained to the producers. "I can't go back to being Gilbert."

More recently Talbot has reflected affectionately on his Beaver experience in articles and interviews and even in a Frontline documentary, "Diet Wars."

== KQED ==
In the 1980s, Talbot was a staff reporter and producer at KQED-TV, the PBS affiliate in San Francisco.

Early in his career at KQED, Talbot produced two national PBS Peabody Award winners, Broken Arrow, about nuclear weapons accidents, and The Case of Dashiell Hammett, a biography of the crime writer.

During his time at KQED, Talbot produced local documentaries, as well as national PBS documentaries such as Namibia: Behind the Lines, South Africa Under Siege (a portrait of Nelson Mandela's ANC in exile), and The Gospel and Guatemala (an investigation with Elizabeth Farnsworth of Guatemala's presidential strongman Efraín Ríos Montt and his conservative evangelical U.S. supporters).

He also wrote and produced (or co-produced with Joan Saffa and Judy Flannery) several hour-long PBS biographies of noted writers, including: Dashiell Hammett, Ken Kesey, Beryl Markham, Carlos Fuentes, and Maxine Hong Kingston.

At KQED, Talbot reported and produced dozens of feature news stories for The MacNeil/Lehrer Newshour.

After leaving KQED in 1989, Talbot produced and co-wrote a PBS biography of John Dos Passos narrated by newsman Robert MacNeil and actor William Hurt.

Talbot has returned to KQED over the years to produce documentary specials. In 1991, he investigated the May 1990 car bomb explosion in Oakland, California that nearly killed Earth First! environmental activists Judi Bari and Darryl Cherney. Talbot's documentary, Who Bombed Judi Bari?, critiqued the FBI and Oakland Police Department's charges against her and Cherney, and raised questions about who was actually responsible for placing the pipe bomb in her car.

Returning again to KQED in 2001, Talbot wrote and produced a one-hour documentary about Jerry Brown as mayor of Oakland, The Celebrity and the City. He had previously produced a KQED documentary about San Francisco Mayor Art Agnos, "The Art of Being Mayor."

== Frontline ==
Talbot has had a long association with Frontline, beginning with his documentary on the financing of the 1992 presidential campaign, The Best Campaign Money Can Buy. It won a DuPont Award. Many of his Frontline films were co-productions with the Center for Investigative Reporting. He continued such projects through 2007 with his documentary on the media, News War: What's Happening to the News.

His other Frontline news documentaries include "The Heartbeat of America" (an investigation of General Motors), "Public Lands, Private Profits" (about gold mining on federal land in the West), "Rush Limbaugh's America", "The Long March of Newt Gingrich", "Why America Hates the Press", "Spying on Saddam", "Justice for Sale", and "The Battle Over School Choice".

His "investigative biography" of Newt Gingrich – "The Long March of Newt Gingrich" (1995) – drew renewed interest and was posted with updates on the Frontline website in 2012 when Gingrich made an unsuccessful bid for the Republican presidential nomination.

In 2002, Frontline's executive producer David Fanning named Talbot as series editor of Frontline World, Frontline's international news magazine series, which was initially a co-production of WGBH and KQED. Between 2002 and 2008, Talbot oversaw the editorial content of 31 hour-long television episodes and helped commission and supervise nearly 100 broadcast stories.

With colleague Sharon Tiller, Talbot also oversaw the Emmy Award and Webby Award-winning Frontline World website and its online video series, Rough Cuts

Based at UC Berkeley's Graduate School of Journalism, Talbot and Tiller taught classes and helped identify and mentor the "next generation of video journalists" whose work was showcased on Frontline/World.

With reporter Kate Seelye, Talbot also produced a half-hour FRONTLINE/World story, "The Earthquake", about political turmoil in Lebanon and Syria. He was senior producer of the Emmy-winning FRONTLINE/World documentary by Gwynne Roberts, Iraq: Saddam's Road to Hell, an investigation of a massacre of Kurds carried out by Saddam Hussein's regime.

Frontline World won the 2004 Overseas Press Club of America award for best international TV reporting.

== Sound Tracks ==
Talbot was the co-creator and executive producer of Sound Tracks: Music Without Borders, a national PBS music show with host/reporter Marco Werman and reporters Alexis Bloom, Arun Rath and Mirissa Neff. The pilot episode was presented to PBS by Oregon Public Broadcasting, airing in 2010 with stories about the Russian propaganda song "A Man like Putin," Afrobeat legend Fela Kuti, and Borat music composer Erran Baron Cohen, and a performance by fado singer Mariza.

A second one-hour episode hosted by KQED aired nationally in 2012 with Wynton Marsalis, Youssou N'Dour, Julie Fowlis and Of Monsters and Men.

Talbot was also the executive producer of a series of twenty Sound Tracks Quick Hits online music videos for PBS Digital and YouTube, including interviews with and performances by Levon Helm, Yuja Wang, Hélène Grimaud, KT Tunstall, Seun Kuti, Seu Jorge, Anoushka Shankar and Of Monsters and Men.

== Writing ==
Talbot's articles have appeared in Salon.com, the Washington Post Magazine, The Nation, Mother Jones, Rolling Stone, the San Francisco Chronicle, the KQED website, and the Los Angeles Times. Talbot wrote about meeting and interviewing Zimbabwe's Robert Mugabe in an article, "From Liberator to Tyrant," for the Frontline/World website.

In the 1970s, he was a reporter, writer and editor for Internews and the International Bulletin, a radio and print foreign news service based in Berkeley, California. [The link is to another organization, also called Internews. The Internews Steve Talbot wrote for was a small, non-profit news service located in Berkeley, CA, that specialized in international affairs, with feeds for radio stations and a publication, The International Bulletin.] He specialized in reporting about Africa and was active in anti-apartheid protests.

== Public Broadcasting Service (PBS) and freelance production ==
For Oregon Public Broadcasting and PBS, Talbot wrote and directed with David Davis, The Sixties: The Years That Shaped a Generation, a two-hour history special that aired nationally on PBS in 2005. It drew from his earlier film, 1968: The Year That Shaped a Generation (1998).

He has executive produced a number of indie documentaries, including The Price of Sex, a documentary by director and photo journalist Mimi Chakarova about sex trafficking in Eastern Europe and the Middle East. Chakarova won the 2011 Nestor Almendros Award for courage in filmmaking from the Human Rights Watch Film Festival in New York and the Daniel Pearl Award from the International Consortium of Investigative Journalists.

Talbot wrote the one-hour political biography, Moscone: A Legacy of Change (2018), about San Francisco Mayor George Moscone, "the people's mayor" who was assassinated in 1978 along with gay Supervisor Harvey Milk.

From 2012 to 2014, Talbot was senior producer for video projects at the Center for Investigative Reporting, including feature news stories and short documentaries for the PBS Newshour, Univision, KQED-TV in San Francisco, and The New York Times. At CIR, Talbot also led the editorial team that created and ran "The I Files", the first investigative news channel on YouTube.

From 2015 to 2022, Talbot was senior producer for documentary shorts at ITVS / Independent Lens (PBS) in San Francisco. He commissioned filmmakers and arranged distribution of their films to a wide range of media outlets, including the PBS Newshour, The Atlantic, Salon and USA Today.

From 2019 to 2020, Talbot co-wrote and co-produced with Christine Ni four documentaries for the San Francisco Bay Area NBC series Bay Area Revelations, narrated by Peter Coyote. He started with the episodes "Exploring Space" and "Loma Prieta Earthquake, 30 Years Later". He continued in 2020 with "Female Sports Icons" and "Riding the Waves", about surfing in Northern California.

Talbot produced and directed the feature documentary "The Movement and the 'Madman' " for the PBS series American Experience in 2023. The film reveals how anti-Vietnam war protests in the U.S. in the fall of 1969 pressured President Nixon and his national security adviser Henry Kissinger to call off their planned major escalation of the war, including the threatened use of nuclear weapons. The film has been broadcast in a number of countries, including the UK, Australia, France and Vietnam.

== Personal life ==
Stephen Talbot lives in San Francisco with his wife, Pippa Gordon, a medical social worker. They named their son Dashiell, now an attorney, after San Francisco mystery writer Dashiell Hammett. Their daughter, Caitlin, graduated with an M.F.A. from American Conservatory Theater, in San Francisco. In 2015, he wrote a story, "Call the Midwife", reminiscing about the home birth of his daughter.

Talbot's sister, New Yorker magazine staffer Margaret Talbot, wrote The Entertainer: Movies, Magic and My Father's Twentieth Century (Riverhead Books, 2012), about their father, Lyle Talbot, and their family history. His younger brother, David Talbot, is the author of several books, including Season of the Witch (about San Francisco in the 1960s and 1970s), and was the founder and original editor-in-chief of Salon.com. His sister, Cynthia, is a medical doctor in Portland, Oregon. His nephew, Joe Talbot, won the Best Director prize at Sundance for his debut feature film, The Last Black Man in San Francisco (2019).

== Awards ==
Talbot has won numerous awards for his broadcast journalism, including two national News and Documentary Emmy Awards, three Peabody Awards, two DuPont-Columbia Journalism Silver Batons, a George Polk Award, six regional (Northern California) Emmys, three Golden Gate Awards from the San Francisco International Film Festival, three Thomas M. Storke International Journalism Awards from the World Affairs Council of Northern California, an Edward R. Murrow Award from the Overseas Press Club of America, a First Prize TV Award from the Education Writers Association, a National Press Club Arthur Rowse Award for media criticism, and an Edgar Allan Poe Award from the Mystery Writers of America. He has been nominated three times for best documentary script writing by the Writers Guild of America.

== Select filmography ==
Year	Title	Role
1959–1963	Leave It to Beaver; 56 episodes (TV)	Gilbert Gates/Gilbert Bates
1959	Wanted Dead or Alive season 2 episode 3 (The Matchmaker)	Rufe Meecham
1960	Perry Mason "The Case of the Wandering Widow" (TV)	Jimmie Kendall
1961	The Twilight Zone "Static" (TV)	The Boy
1962	The Twilight Zone "The Fugitive" (TV)	Howie
1980	"Broken Arrow: Can a Nuclear Weapons Accident Happen Here?" (TV)	Reporter, Co-Producer
1982	The Case of Dashiell Hammett (TV)	Writer; Producer
1984–85	The Gospel and Guatemala (TV)	Reporter, Co-Producer
1986	"World Without Walls: Beryl Markham's African Memoir" (TV)	Writer, Co-Producer
1987	"Further! Ken Kesey's American Dreams" (TV)	Writer, Co-Producer
1989	Crossing Borders: The Journey of Carlos Fuentes (TV)	Writer, Co-Producer
1990	"Maxine Hong Kingston: Talking Story" (TV)	Writer, Co-Producer
1992	Frontline "The Best Campaign Money Can Buy" (TV)	Producer
1993	Frontline "The Heartbeat of America" (TV)	Producer
1994	Frontline "Public Lands, Private Profits" (TV)	Producer
1994	Frontline "Rush Limbaugh's America" (TV)	Producer, Co-Writer
1995	Frontline "The Long March of Newt Gingrich" (TV)	Producer, Co-Writer
1996	Frontline "Why America Hates the Press" (TV)	Correspondent, Producer
1999	Frontline "Spying on Saddam" (TV)	Producer
1999	Frontline "Justice for Sale" (TV)	Producer, Co-Writer
2000	Frontline "Battle Over School Choice" (TV)	Producer, Writer
2001	"The Celebrity and the City" (Jerry Brown as mayor of Oakland); KQED (TV)	Producer, Writer
2002–2008	Frontline "Frontline World" (TV) 30 episodes	Series Editor, Senior Producer
2004	Frontline "Diet Wars" (TV)	Host
2005	The Sixties: The Years That Shaped a Generation (TV)	Co-Producer
2007	Frontline "News War: What's Happening to the News" (TV)	Producer, Co-Writer
2010, 2012	"Sound Tracks: Music Without Borders" (TV) PBS	Executive Producer
2011	The Price of Sex (film)	Executive Producer
2013	"To Kill a Sparrow" (short film)	Senior Producer
2015	"Daisy and Max"; Al Jazeera America	Executive Producer
2018	"Moscone: A Legacy of Change" (TV) PBS	Writer
2019	"Bay Area Revelations: Loma Prieta Earthquake, 30 Years Later" (TV)	Co-Producer, Co-Writer
2020	"Bay Area Revelations: Riding the Waves" (TV)	Co-Producer, Co-Writer
2023	The Movement and the "Madman"	Producer/Director
2026	Last Christian in Bethlehem	Director/Producer
