= Leave It to Beaver season 3 =

Leave It to Beaver
- Season 3
- No. of episodes: 39

Release
- Original network: ABC
- Original release: October 3, 1959 – June 25, 1960

Season chronology
- ← Previous; Season 2 Next → Season 4

The third season of the American television situation comedy Leave It to Beaver premiered on October 3, 1959 and concluded on June 25, 1960. It consisted of 39 episodes shot in black-and-white, each running approximately 25 minutes in length.

== Episodes ==
No. overall	No. in season	Title	Directed by	Written by	Original release date	Prod. code
79	1	"Blind Date Committee"	Norman Tokar	Katherine & Dale Eunson & Joe Connelly & Bob Mosher	October 3, 1959	13204
Wally is appointed chairman of the blind date committee for an upcoming school dance. The committee is supposed to find dates for all the girls who want to go to the dance but cannot find their own dates. Wally is unable to find a date for new transfer student Jill Bartlett and kindly offers to escort her himself. Wally begins to regret his invite because they have not met; he fears she is a "gopher" and all the other guys will give him the business. He sends Beaver to do reconnaissance work so that he has some idea of what Jill looks like before the dance. Ward tells Wally he was in a similar situation as a boy and paid his friends to dance with his date. Wally tries the same ruse with Jill, and though she is aware of what Wally is doing she plays along and has a good time. Later, they have sodas and discuss her challenges socializing with boys and his personal interests. Jill says she thinks Wally is one of the nicest boys she has ever met. Guests: Rusty Stevens as Larry Mondello, Ken Osmond as Eddie Haskell, Tommy Ivo as Duke Hathaway, Beverly Washburn as Jill Bartlett. The first episode to feature the 211 Pine Street house.
80	2	"Beaver Takes a Bath"	Norman Tokar	Joe Connelly & Bob Mosher	October 10, 1959	13208
Ward and June go to an overnight company function in Freeport. When the sitter cancels, Wally is left in charge and becomes bossy. Wally tells Beaver to bathe, so Beaver starts to fill the bathtub and dawdles. Wally then tells Beaver to come to supper. Beaver forgets the bath and runs downstairs. While they are eating the boys notice water leaking from the kitchen ceiling. They run upstairs and mop up; Mrs. Mondello drops by with Larry to make sure the boys are okay. Wally dries the ceiling with a hair dryer and they agree to not tell their parents what happened. The next day, plaster falls to the floor from the same spot on the kitchen ceiling. Ward blames shoddy workmanship; the boys remain silent. Later, Ward gives Wally the payment that the sitter would have received and gives Wally a heartfelt thanks. Wally and Beaver decide they must tell their father the truth. Ward and June are glad they learned they have such nice boys. Guests: Rusty Stevens as Larry Mondello, Madge Blake as Mrs. Mondello. At the hotel where the Cleavers stay, the room has two twin beds. Continuity error: beginning in the hamburger dinner scene, Wally has a bandage on the back of his left hand in some shots.
81	3	"School Bus"	Norman Tokar	Joe Connelly & Bob Mosher	October 17, 1959	13201
Miss Landers tells the class that the school bus service is being extended. The Cleavers' new neighborhood is included. After riding the school bus for a week, arriving at the bus stop with increasing tardiness each morning, Beaver is suspended from the bus for fighting. Ward does not want to have to drive him. Beaver delivers a fulsome letter of apology, written with Wally's help, to the bus driver Mr. Crawford. Beaver is allowed to ride the bus again. When Judy is suspended from the bus, she visits Beaver at his home to learn how he managed to get reinstated. Beaver gives her a draft copy of his letter and Judy is soon riding the bus again. When Wally asks him why he helped the meanest girl in school, Beaver explains that whenever she is being mean he will know that he had once done something nice for her. Guests: Rusty Stevens as Larry Mondello, Sue Randall as Miss Landers, Jeri Weil as Judy Hensler, Stanley Fafara as Whitey Whitney, James Parnell as Mr. Crawford, Bobby Mittelstaedt as Charles Fredericks.
82	4	"Beaver's Prize"	Norman Tokar	Joe Connelly & Bob Mosher	October 24, 1959	13209
Beaver is grounded on Saturday for leaving the cap off the ink bottle, causing Ward to spill ink all over his desk drawer and papers. After the rest of the Cleavers go out, Larry talks Beaver into sneaking off to the movies. A drawing is held at the movies and Beaver wins a bicycle. He cannot take it home without betraying his disobedience to his father so Larry offers to take it home. Larry tells his mother a fantastic lie about where the bicycle came from. Ward brings home ice cream to thank Beaver for accepting his punishment. Beaver says he might go to the movies on Sunday and win a bicycle. Mrs. Mondello calls to inform Ward that Larry cannot keep Beaver's bicycle; the Cleavers decide to wait to see if Beaver will tell the truth. The next day Beaver confesses to his parents and explains he donated the bicycle. Beaver wonders why he won the bicycle, and guesses the best thing to do is always do what you're told. Larry thinks that's pretty hard because kids are told so much. Guests: Rusty Stevens as Larry Mondello, Madge Blake as Mrs. Mondello, Ken Osmond as Eddie Haskell, Peter Leeds as Theater Manager.
83	5	"Baby Picture"	Norman Tokar	Joe Connelly & Bob Mosher	October 31, 1959	13212
Miss Landers asks her students to bring in a baby picture for a "Most Beautiful Baby" contest. Without showing Beaver and to meet the contest deadline, June mails Miss Landers a baby picture of Beaver in which he is naked. Beaver is embarrassed when Wally shows him a copy of what was sent. Beaver wants to tell his mother what she did to him, but Wally tells him that if he hollers about the picture she will get upset or even cry. Beaver does not want to hurt her. In typical fashion Beaver seeks Ward's advice without providing the specifics of his predicament; as a result his takeaway is to "hide my feelings and take it like a man". Beaver gets to school early and asks Miss Landers to give the photo back to him without looking at it. Miss Landers understands and she obliges. Later, Ward cuts the photo down to just a headshot. Beaver says it sure is good when your father is a friend. Guests: Stanley Fafara as Whitey Whitney, Sue Randall as Miss Landers, Rusty Stevens as Larry Mondello, Jeri Weil as Judy Hensler, Bobby Mittelstaedt as Charles Fredericks (uncredited).
84	6	"Beaver Takes a Walk"	Norman Tokar	Story by : Theodore and Mathilde Ferro; Teleplay by : Joe Connelly & Bob Mosher	November 7, 1959	13206
Ward keeps June from throwing out his old pedometer and wants to give it to the boys. Wally is being driven everywhere and does not have time to do any walking. To gain their interest, Ward says he walked twenty miles a day at their age. Beaver gets the pedometer. At school Beaver is egged on by Larry and bets a contemptuous Whitey his new fielder's mitt that he too can walk twenty miles a day. By dinnertime, after much roundabout walking, he discovers he's only walked three miles. He surrenders his baseball glove to a gloating Whitey. Beaver is furious at losing the mitt and fears his father's wrath. Wally tells Ward why Beaver is mad. Ward is understanding and tells Beaver he exaggerated the distance he walked in order to share his enthusiasm for the pedometer. Ward buys Beaver another baseball glove and stops himself before telling a grandiose story of his own baseball days. Beaver says not to stop telling them about the neat things he did even if he does "exaggerate 'em up". Guests: Stanley Fafara as Whitey Whitney, Rusty Stevens as Larry Mondello. Beaver walks to school with his new pedometer, but in episode 3 School Bus when Beaver is suspended from the bus, June says it is too far to walk to school.
85	7	"Borrowed Boat"	Norman Tokar	Joe Connelly & Bob Mosher	November 14, 1959	13210
Wally arranges for Beaver to ride on the team bus to a football game, but Beaver has already made a picnic date with Larry. Wally is insulted and says he will not go to that much trouble for Beaver again. At Friends Lake, Beaver and Larry see two older boys rowing a boat; the older boys tell the kids they can use the boat for as long as they want. The police arrive and believe the kids have broken into the boathouse and stolen the boat. At the police station they are unable to identify the older boys. Beaver cannot get a hold of Ward or June so he tearfully turns to Wally. Wally is still sore at the Beaver but he goes down to the station and names the older boys based on Beaver's description. Later, the police sergeant calls Wally with the news that the older boys were caught. Ward and June want an explanation. Wally resists, but Beaver explains the whole thing. Ward drops the matter because after their earlier fight, he was happy that Beaver went to Wally for help. Guests: Frank Gerstle as Police Sergeant, Tommy Cole as Red Bennett, Martin Smith as First Police Officer, Madge Blake as Mrs. Mondello, Tom Masters as Fred Thornton, Rusty Stevens as Larry Mondello.
86	8	"Beaver's Tree"	Norman Tokar	Story by : Dick Conway & Roland MacLane; Teleplay by : Joe Connelly & Bob Mosher	November 21, 1959	13202
Beaver's class takes turns awkwardly reciting a poem about trees. Miss Landers then reads the poem to demonstrate how it can make them feel. Beaver is moved and remembers the tree he was given for his birthday, which was planted at the Mapleton Drive house. He takes Larry with him to the old house (now owned by Mr. Benner) and they dig up the tree. Mr Benner was away from the house but the neighbors saw the boys. June and Ward find Wally and Beaver sneaking the tree across the yard. Beaver later explains to his parents that the tree was a friend he loves. June and Ward understand and promise to straighten things out with Mr. Benner. At school, the class recites the poem again and Miss Landers compliments Beaver's effort. Guests: Rusty Stevens as Larry Mondello, Sue Randall as Miss Landers, Jeri Weil as Judy Hensler, Stanley Fafara as Whitey Whitney. The poem is "The Heart of the Tree" by Henry Cuyler Bunner.
87	9	"Teacher Comes to Dinner"	Norman Tokar	Story by : Joe Connelly & Bob Mosher; Teleplay by : Katherine & Dale Eunson	November 28, 1959	13213
At breakfast the Beaver talks about Miss Landers and all the ways she is the neatest teacher in the whole school. June wants to do something nice for Miss Landers and invites her to dinner that evening. Beaver is unaware of the invite until Miss Landers thanks him after school. Beaver is uneasy and reluctantly confides in Larry. Larry rattles off all the things that could go wrong, from being called teacher's pet, to giving Miss Landers "toenail" poisoning, to her falling and breaking her leg. Then Larry immediately discloses to Whitey what he promised Beaver not to tell any of the other guys. At home, Beaver is almost hysterical at the prospect of something going wrong. Miss Landers arrives and Beaver is distressed by her bare arms and open-toed shoes. During dinner on the patio Wally spots Larry, Whitey, and Gilbert spying up in a tree. After the table is cleared Miss Landers orders the boys down from the tree. She understands that it is hard for little boys to realize that a teacher thinks and acts like a real person. Ward invites the boys to join them for dessert. Beaver's family is impressed with Miss Landers. Guests: Sue Randall as Miss Landers, Jeri Weil as Judy Hensler, Stanley Fafara as Whitey Whitney, Rusty Stevens as Larry Mondello, Stephen Talbot as Gilbert Bates.
88	10	"Beaver's Fortune"	Norman Tokar	Story by : Joe Connelly & Bob Mosher; Teleplay by : Theodore and Mathilde Ferro	December 5, 1959	13205
A fifth-grader named Sonny Cartwright has been picking on the boys in Beaver's class. At school he and Larry get into a shoving match. On Saturday the Beaver and Larry spend their last pennies on a weighing machine. They find fortunes on the backs of the weight cards; Beaver's fortune says "This is your lucky day." The two decide to walk around to see what good luck happens to Beaver. They see Sonny on his way to a music lesson. Larry provokes Sonny but immediately chickens out and instead offers Beaver for a fight. Sonny cannot beat up Beaver right then - he has to take his music lesson - so he says they should meet at 3 o'clock. Even though Larry started it, he does not see why he should get in trouble on Beaver's lucky day. After lunch Wally tells Beaver that fortunes are unreal; Ward confirms that luck has nothing to do with fighting. Beaver's friends go with him to the park to watch the fight. Wally planned to walk Beaver to the park but loses track of time; he then reveals the fight to their mother. June panics but Ward and Wally convince her to not intervene; instead Wally heads to the park. Later Wally brings the Beaver home unscathed - Sonny chickened out and does not show up. Beaver admits to his father he was afraid. Ward says fear is not a bad emotion; it is a form of common sense and keeps us from doing foolish things. Beaver thanks his father for making him not feel bad to be scared. At school Beaver chooses not to call Sonny chicken; Larry insists on giving Sonny the business and gets hit right in the stomach. Guests: Rusty Stevens as Larry Mondello, Stanley Fafara as Whitey Whitney, Bobby Mittelstaedt as Charles Fredericks, Callen John Thomas Jr. as Sonny Cortwright.
89	11	"Beaver Makes a Loan"	David Butler	Joe Connelly & Bob Mosher	December 12, 1959	13219
Beaver needs to buy a notebook that costs 25 cents. Ward gives him a dollar and expects 75 cents back. Larry also needs a notebook but does not have money; he sees Beaver's dollar, asks for a loan, and offers to go buy both their notebooks. He uses the remaining 50 cents to settle an old debt at the school store. When Ward asks for his change and Beaver explains what happened, Ward says he will have to do without his movie money for Saturday or get it from Larry. Beaver has faith that Larry will pay him back the 75 cents. On Saturday Larry heads to Beaver's house to pay back the money but encounters Gilbert and Whitey; they convince him to go to lunch at Whitey's and then the movies. Beaver waits around the house all afternoon believing that Larry is on his way over. Ward asks Beaver to run to the drugstore and pick up a paper. Beaver hears Larry telling the other boys he has spent the 75 cents and sees him finishing a soda at the drugstore counter. Beaver tells Larry to go outside so Beaver can sock him but Larry refuses. Beaver calls him a rat and vows never to speak to him again. Larry is unremorseful until the other boys confirm that he is kind of a rat. When Larry threatens to join the Foreign Legion and get killed in the desert, Beaver is touched and the two become friends again. Guests: Rusty Stevens as Larry Mondello, Madge Blake as Mrs. Mondello, Stephen Talbot as Gilbert Bates, Stanley Fafara as Whitey Whitney.
90	12	"Beaver the Magician"	David Butler	George Tibbles, Joe Connelly & Bob Mosher	December 19, 1959	13218
Beaver and Larry are in a magic shop and everything is so expensive that they wind up with a 15-cent coin disappearing box. At home, Beaver receives a lukewarm response to this well-known magic trick but finds the perfect audience in a gullible little boy named Benjie Bellamy. Later when little Benjie thinks Larry has transformed Beaver into a rock, he picks it up and takes it home in his wagon. Finding Benjie sleeping with the rock, his mother is unable to convince him that the rock is not Beaver. The next morning Mrs. Bellamy takes Benjie to the Cleaver house to prove Beaver was not turned into a rock. However Beaver has gone to Aunt Martha's for the weekend. Even Wally, thinking more like a kid than the adults, is not able to convince Benjie. Beaver is brought home early to prove that he is not a rock. Guests: Ann Doran as Mrs. Bellamy, Madge Kennedy as Aunt Martha, Eddie Marr as Uncle Artie, Joey Scott as Benjie Bellamy, Rusty Stevens as Larry Mondello. Continuity error: When the Cleavers lived on Mapleton Drive, the Bellamys lived on the same street. In this episode the Bellamys still appear to be nearby neighbors despite the Cleavers moving to Pine Street.
91	13	"June's Birthday"	David Butler	Story by : Katherine & Dale Eunson; Teleplay by : Joe Connelly & Bob Mosher	December 26, 1959	13214
June insists the family not make a fuss for her birthday. Ward asks the boys to make a little fuss – 5 dollars' worth. Wally and Beaver cannot agree on what to buy, getting into a fight and splitting the money to buy separate presents. Wally buys her a nice pigskin wallet with her initials on it. Beaver and Larry seek Mrs. Mondello's advice, and she says she would just like a nice blouse. They go to a "ritzy" store where Larry sees a neat blouse that the saleslady claims is their exquisite La Parisien model. Beaver is excited for his mother to open the present. June tells Beaver the blouse is beautiful but in private asks Ward who would sell a child such a ghastly thing. Still competing, the boys are in the kitchen where Wally says that Beaver's present is creepy and that their mother did not want to hurt his feelings. Beaver continues to believe that June likes the blouse, asking when she will wear it, and she finally agrees she will wear it to the Mother's Club tea. The next morning June is wearing the blouse; Beaver is proud, but Wally asks if she is really going to wear that thing in front of people. Ward mocks one of the phrases on the back of the blouse, Ooo-La-La, and suggests she change; she can put the blouse back on when she comes home. At the tea, Beaver's class is brought in as a surprise to sing for the mothers. Beaver is hurt to see that his mother is not wearing the blouse. He begins to sulk and forgets to sing. At home June discusses the situation with Wally – she does not know what to say to Beaver. Wally says that she double-crossed Beaver but she does not have to be chicken. June explains to Beaver there are certain things people say to be kind, and you learn how to spare people's feelings by not always saying what you feel. Beaver says he's not a very good blouse-picker-outer and forgives her. Guests: Rusty Stevens as Larry Mondello, Madge Blake as Mrs. Mondello, Claire Carleton as Saleslady, Stanley Fafara as Whitey Whitney, Sue Randall as Miss Landers, Jean Vander Pyl as Woman's Club Member, Jeri Weil as Judy Hensler.
92	14	"Tire Trouble"	Norman Tokar	Story by : Jon Zimmer; Teleplay by : Joe Connelly & Bob Mosher	January 2, 1960	13220
Beaver convinces Wally they can raise chinchillas to make money, and they can build a chinchilla cage while they write for details. Ward comes home from work to find their unfinished cage and his tools all over the garage; he makes it clear he does not want to find the garage in the same condition by the next night. But the next day the boys get home late and they do not clean it up. Ward tells them it was a very stupid thing to do to leave the garage in that condition. The boys admit they gave up their plan to build a cage for raising chinchillas. On Saturday Ward and Fred have to go to the office while June cleans house and the boys clean up the garage. Ward had backed the car out into the driveway and unknowingly drove over a small board with a nail in it. When Beaver pulls the board off the tire, the tire goes flat. Eddie Haskell stops by and suggests they get the tire patched at the gas station. The boys roll the tire through Mayfield, wreaking havoc on sidewalks and streets as they lose control of the tire. Fred spots them from Ward's office window but Ward is certain his boys are home cleaning out the garage. Later Eddie calls to ask Wally if he got the flat tire back on the car before his old man caught him, not realizing Ward has answered the phone. Ward is overly polite to the boys, so Wally knows he has the goods on them. Beaver explains they "flatted" a tire, and when Ward asks why they didn't come to him or their mother, Wally says they didn't want Ward to call them stupid again. They believe if a guy gets hit, then it goes away; but if a guy's father calls him stupid, then it makes him feel bad for a real long time. Ward apologizes and knows he must watch what he says when he gets angry. Before supper they are tossing the football in the front yard; when Beaver misses a catch, Ward stops himself before calling Beaver a name. Their bonding continues as they head in for supper. Guests: Ken Osmond as Eddie Haskell. Richard Deacon as Fred Rutherford.
93	15	"Larry Hides Out"	David Butler	Joe Connelly & Bob Mosher	January 9, 1960	13221
Beaver is spending the day at Larry's house. They go into Larry's sister's room and look through her things; they are reading her diary when Mrs. Mondello catches them. She scolds Larry in front of Beaver, sends him to his room, and sends Beaver home. Larry is upset that she hollered at him in front of his friend and decides to run away. Initially he plans to go to Mexico but Beaver's house is closer. Ward and June return from shopping and get a call from Mrs. Mondello who explains that Larry has run away. When they ask Beaver if he has seen Larry, he plays innocent. Wally comes home and is confident Larry will be back based on his own experience running away as a kid. Wally goes upstairs to wash up when Larry reveals himself camped out in their bathtub; Wally is unsure whether he should squeal. Beaver has his dinner in his room so that he can secretly share it with Larry. Larry complains about the food but still cleans the plate. When Wally brings them dessert, Larry suggests they smuggle his suitcase up on a rope from the bushes outside. Wally is hesitant but continues to help them. Mrs. Mondello stops by, convinced that Larry would have come to the Cleavers' house. As Ward assures her that Larry has not shown up there, they see Larry's suitcase going up in the air. Ward immediately knows what is going on - but when he asks Wally and Beaver where Larry is, they each feign innocence. Ward finds the dessert dish by the bathtub; to force the boys to confess he suggests they take a nice hot shower. He offers to turn the water on, get it good and steaming hot, when Beaver blurts out that he'll burn Larry. The boys are left in their room to think about what they have done while Larry is taken downstairs to face his mother. The next day Wally and Beaver are pulling weeds as punishment. Wally says it would have been a lot easier if they had gone to Dad for help, and that you don't know it's trouble until after you get caught. Guests: Rusty Stevens as Larry Mondello, Madge Blake as Mrs. Mondello.
94	16	"Pet Fair"	David Butler	Katherine & Dale Eunson	January 16, 1960	13215
Beaver wishes he doesn't have to go to school because he does not have a pet to bring to the Pet Fair. Ward reminds Beaver that he didn't take care of previous pets, and June assures him others in his class won't have pets, but Beaver says the kids without pets are creeps. Ward is firm that they will not buy him a pet for the class fair. On the way to school Beaver and Larry pass by the pet store where a 40-year-old parrot says hello to them. In class Miss Landers asks each child what pet they will bring; when Beaver is called, he lies and says he has a parrot that can talk and sing. Wally comes home after school and is bewildered to hear his mother singing a melancholy song (I'll Never Smile Again) while preparing dinner in the kitchen. He's never heard a regular mother sing before. Meanwhile Beaver and Larry have gone back to the pet store. The shop owner is unable to coax the parrot, Sergeant Burke, to sing "Over There". He tells the boys the parrot costs $200 but Beaver doesn't have that kind of money. Ward has a change of heart and brings home a hamster for Beaver. The family is unaware of Beaver's lie and confused when he gets upset about the hamster. After dinner Beaver wants to call Miss Landers and have Wally pretend to be the parrot; the parrot will say it is sick and can't come to school tomorrow. Wally says it is goofy and won't work. Beaver isn't convinced that any of Wally's suggestions will work either and pouts on his bed. Wally goes downstairs under the guise of getting a sandwich, and instead tells his parents about the trouble Beaver's in. Ward and June have a spirited debate - Ward says the boys must face up to their mistakes, but June thinks every once in a while parents should back up a child's mistake. June explains she was forced to admit to a lie she had once made at boarding school and that it still hurt a little bit. Ward goes to find a parrot at 9 o'clock at night. The pet store owner agrees to rent Sergeant Burke to the Cleavers for a day; as Ward gets to his car, Burke sings. The next day the class Pet Fair is a success; the children voted Sergeant Burke the most popular pet. Beaver doesn't know if he should have the blue ribbon and explains to Miss Landers that they rented the parrot. She tells Beaver he is fortunate to have a father who understands, and she hopes he won't expect his father to keep backing him up when he makes up stories. As he begins to leave, Burke sings. That night Beaver talks to Ward about why fathers make mistakes to help their children. He also thanks Ward for the hamster. Sue Randall’s appendix had ruptured during filming and she was rushed to the hospital. Guests: Rusty Stevens as Larry Mondello, Sue Randall as Miss Landers, Jeri Weil as Judy Hensler, Stanley Fafara as Whitey Whitney, Tim Graham as Mr. Allen, Patty Turner as Linda Dennison, Darcy Hinton as Alice.
95	17	"Wally's Test"	Norman Tokar	Joe Connelly & Bob Mosher	January 23, 1960	13222
Wally has a midterm test in History class on Monday and that is his weakest subject; Ward says passing that test is more important than seeing Mary Ellen Rogers. Beaver helps Wally study in Ward's den. Eddie and Lumpy come over; Eddie introduces Lumpy to June and informs her that Lumpy was left back in their class this year. June tells them Wally is studying but they can say hello. Wally tells Eddie he should be the one studying but Eddie says he and The Lump have "got it made". Ward comes into the den so Eddie and Lumpy say goodbye. Outside Eddie reassures Lumpy - they will write down World War I dates and battles and names of the bigshots on a paper towel and stick it in the towel machine in the washroom; during the test they get excused to wash their hands and pull down the towel. As the test begins Wally gets ink on his hands and asks to be excused to wash his hands. The History teacher Mr. Gannon is dubious but says alright. When Wally dries his hands he sees writing on one of the towels: 'To thine own self be true ... Polonius and Mr. Gannon'. He doesn't understand the joke so he throws it away and returns to class. Eddie finally asks to be excused and Mr. Gannon says alright; he takes so much time in the washroom that Lumpy is sent to get him. He went thru all the towels in the washroom and the towel is gone. Lumpy thinks Wally found it but Eddie says Wally is too square to get wise to anything. Back in the classroom Wally does not seem to be struggling with the test so they are convinced he took the cheat sheet. The next morning the test results are posted; Eddie and Lumpy failed - Lumpy got a higher grade last year - but they see Wally got a 92. They agree Wally is a dirty rat. When Wally comes up to see his grade they accuse him of stealing the answers but back down from slugging him (Lumpy has to protect his hands for clarinet). Eddie vows to do something. That night Mr. Gannon calls. Wally is still unaware of his friends' cheating scheme and is worried why a teacher called him up at night. In the morning Mr. Gannon reads Wally an anonymous note he found on his desk; the letter accuses Wally of being a dirty cheat. Mr. Gannon knows Wally didn't get the answers off a towel because he found the towel before the exam; he also believes Wally isn't that type of fella; and the fact that Wally got a 92 proves Wally didn't have to cheat. Mr. Gannon says the same fella who wrote the answers on the towel was the one who wrote the note - Eddie Haskell. But Wally doesn't believe Eddie would do a thing like that to him. Mr. Gannon points out that it is Eddie's handwriting. Wally says Eddie is a no-good skunk! After dinner Wally is still upset and talks to his father. Ward wants Wally to think whether beating up Eddie will change him. A fella with Eddie's attitude will change when he wakes up one morning and can't stand himself. For Eddie's sake they have to hope it will happen. Eddie comes by to speak to Wally - he talked with Mr. Gannon and knows Wally didn't steal his answers; he apologizes. Eddie says he might take a crack at studying. The next day Mr. Gannon lectures the class about cheating but does not single out Eddie; when they move on to the day's lesson, Eddie raises his hand and correctly answers the first question. Mr. Gannon teases him and Wally smiles, happy to see that Eddie did study. Guests: Ken Osmond as Eddie Haskell, Frank Bank as Lumpy Rutherford, Frank Albertson as Mr. Gannon, Carol Sydes as Nita Norton.
96	18	"Beaver's Library Book"	Norman Tokar	Joe Connelly & Bob Mosher	January 30, 1960	13211
Beaver is allowed to select any book to read for a book report. Ward suggests Treasure Island but cannot find his copy; he loans Beaver his library card to borrow the book from the public library. Beaver and Larry go to the library and a conspicuously forgetful Beaver takes out the book. A few days later he reads his report to Wally. Wally says the report is pretty crummy and Beaver explains that he read only 30 pages before he lost the book. Wally cautions Beaver to find the book. Eddie finds several overdue notices in Beaver's drawer and shows Wally. Wally cautions Beaver again; when he steps out of the room, Eddie says that Beaver will be thrown right in jail. When Beaver and Larry explain it was Ward's library card, Eddie says they'll toss his old man in the clink. The younger boys are frightened. Beaver asks June what she would do if Ward didn't come home and June says they couldn't do without him for very long. Beaver and Larry go to the library looking for someone who is in charge ("anybody that's not dead") so Beaver can keep his father out of jail. The head librarian Mr. Davenport tells Beaver the book has to be replaced and the best thing is to tell his father what happened. Beaver wonders why he believed what Eddie told him and Mr. Davenport explains when we do something wrong our conscience bothers us. At home Ward is waiting for Beaver to confess - Mr. Davenport called Ward's office after Beaver left the library. Beaver rehearses an apology in front of Wally and then finds excuses to delay talking to his father. He finally goes to the den to apologize. Ward says Beaver can't go through life doing things wrong and hoping they're going to turn out right; it's always wrong to tell a lie. The book is later found in Larry's locker and Beaver returns it to the library - it smelled like a baloney sandwich but the lady took it back anyway. Guests: Theodore Newton as Mr. Davenport, Claudia Bryar as Librarian, Ken Osmond as Eddie Haskell, Rusty Stevens as Larry Mondello.
97	19	"Wally's Election"	Norman Tokar	Joe Connelly & Bob Mosher	February 6, 1960	13216
Eddie nominates Wally to run for sophomore class president against Lumpy Rutherford. Wally is initially reluctant. When Fred Rutherford gloats that Wally has no chance of winning against his Lumpy, Ward gives Wally a pep talk. Wally then aggressively pursues the position. His friends and classmates become annoyed with his hand-shaking and back-slapping campaign style. Wally loses the election. Ward apologizes to him for the advice-giving and tells him parents sometimes "go off the deep end" when they get older and live through their children. Guests: Ken Osmond as Eddie Haskell, Richard Deacon as Fred Rutherford, Frank Bank as Lumpy Rutherford, "Tiger" Fafara as Tooey Brown, Buddy Hart as Chester Anderson, Ross Elliott as Mr. Hyatt, Ann Barnes as Frances Hobbs, Carol Sydes as Alma Hanson, Dennison Kerlee as Tall Sophomore.
98	20	"Beaver and Andy"	David Butler	Joe Connelly & Bob Mosher	February 13, 1960	13223
Ward's old acquaintance Andy comes by the new house seeking work. Ward hires Andy to repaint the trim despite June's reservations. Beaver hears Ward ask Andy about his "trouble". At dinner Beaver says that Andy is a real neat guy; June asks Ward about Andy's "you know what". She insists they can't have any of that around the boys, and the boys wonder what trouble Andy's got. Beaver spends time with Andy and says he doesn't think there is anything wrong with Andy. This prompts Andy to empty his bottle of whiskey into the bushes. June and Ward decide not to tell the boys about Andy's drinking problem. One afternoon Beaver is home alone when Andy tells Beaver he feels shaky. He asks for a drink so Beaver offers water and Honolulu punch. After some prompting Beaver gives him Ward's Christmas brandy. Beaver leaves to go to Larry's house. Later Ward is on the phone telling Andy he doesn't have to apologize; Beaver comes home and his parents continue to conceal the truth. They tell him Andy won't be coming back. Wally reveals to Beaver that Andy was drinking and fell off the ladder (he later adds that he saw Ward helping Andy into the car). At dinner Beaver brings up Andy. Ward blames whomever sold Andy the first drink that day. Beaver tells them he gave Andy the bottle of brandy. As Ward begins to chastise him, Beaver protests that the way they were talking about "troubles" and "you know whats", he couldn't have known something was wrong. Ward says Beaver is right - they can't really protect anyone by hiding the truth. Wally says somebody's gotta tell a guy about all the bad junk in the world; Ward hopes he and their mom are the guys to do it. The next day Beaver is playing alone when Andy runs into him. Andy apologizes to Beaver and resolves to finish painting the Cleavers' trim. Guest: Wendell Holmes as Andy Hadlock.
99	21	"Beaver's Dance"	Bretaigne Windust	Joe Connelly & Bob Mosher	February 20, 1960	13224
June is thrilled when Beaver and Larry are invited to a series of dances by the Mayfield Cotillion. Wally warns there will be a lot of yellin' and screamin' but June insists they will convince Beaver to go. Beaver vows he's not going, so Ward gets impatient and tells Beaver he is going. Mrs. Mondello arrives at the Cleavers shoving a reluctant Larry and the boys are allowed to walk to the dance alone. At the dance the children pair off; there aren't enough girls so Beaver has to dance with Mrs. Prescott. The boys commiserate over crummy refreshments and make a pact to never go to another dance as long as they live. The next Saturday Beaver initially refuses to put on his suit but relents. Walking in their suits and gloves, they decide to sit behind the Anderson's barn and eat the bologna sandwiches Larry had tucked in his pockets. A kid comes along on a horse and she lets the boys take a ride on Whiskers. After the girl rides off, the boys are covered in dirt and come home smelling like horses. They finally confess they didn't go to dancin' school. Ward talks to Beaver about parents having to make their kids do things; he expects Beaver to trust them and do the things they ask with good grace. After school Beaver and Larry discuss what happened to them after they got caught; they agree they will go to the next dance. Beaver thinks they oughta go back to the barn someday to meet the girl with the horse, but Larry says it wouldn't be fun 'cause they wouldn't be ditchin' anything. Guests: Rusty Stevens as Larry Mondello, Madge Blake as Mrs. Mondello, Karen Sue Trent as Cowgirl, Katherine Warren as Miss Prescott.
100	22	"Larry's Club"	David Butler	Joe Connelly & Bob Mosher	February 27, 1960	13226
Larry keeps calling for Beaver but his family doesn't know where he is. Beaver is in the junkyard being sworn in to The Bloody Five club for life; the other boys tell Beaver that Larry isn't neat enough to be a member. At home Larry is upset because Beaver is a rat - he heard boys whispering about the club and knows Beaver joined. Wally tells Beaver that joining the club without Larry was a dirty trick. Then Larry goes to Beaver's wearing a paper bag on his head and a super secret arm band - he tells Beaver about his club The Fiends and all their plans. Beaver says it's the neatest club he ever heard of. Larry can't reveal the club's members and leaves for a secret club meeting. Beaver decides to get unsworn as a Bloody Five so he can be a Fiend. He delivers a resignation letter and confidently walks away. He then goes to Larry's to attend the secret meeting and get voted in as a Fiend. Larry stalls and then blindfolds Beaver and conducts a sham meeting; Beaver gets suspicious and realizes Larry's got no club at all. They fight and part ways. Ward tells a story about castles in a village in France and Beaver understands the castles were like clubs. Ward says having a club to keep others out is the worst reason in the world. Guests: Rusty Stevens as Larry Mondello, Madge Blake as Mrs. Mondello, Stanley Fafara as Whitey Whitney, Gary Allen as Boy in Club, Bobby Beakman as Boy in Club, Neil Seflinger as Harold.
101	23	"School Sweater"	Norman Tokar	Joe Connelly & Bob Mosher	March 5, 1960	13217
Wally loans his high school letterman sweater to Frances Hobbs at a basketball game because she said she was cold. June becomes concerned that Wally is evasive as to the whereabouts of the sweater, and asks Ward to instruct Wally to bring it home. At school Frances continues to wear his sweater. When Wally works up the courage to ask for it back, she says she needs it so she wont get "all soak-y" from the rain but promises to return it the next day. Eddie points out that the next day is Saturday. That evening June and Ward go to the drugstore; when they sit at the counter for ice cream floats they hear a girl bragging about having Wally wrapped around her finger, calling and following her around. They observe the girl confidently walking out and wearing what appears to be Wally's letterman sweater. June panics and sputters about what this girl is doing to her "baby", and Ward reminds her that her "baby" is in high school. Ward is prodded by June to speak with Wally but he is reluctant when he observes Wally taking knots out of Beaver's shoelaces and then taking Beaver to dig up a gopher in the yard on Saturday morning. When the boys return to the house with Eddie instead of a gopher, June excuses Wally so that Ward can have a talk with him in the den. Ward awkwardly tries to share his own teenage experience of having a crush on a girl but Wally is confused so Ward becomes impatient. He reveals what he and June overheard at the drugstore on Friday night and Wally cannot believe it! Wally storms up to his room to get his jacket, where Eddie and Beaver are waiting for him. The three boys, in turn, slam the bedroom door and then the front door as Wally intends to confront that creepy Frances and get his sweater back. Ward tells June that Wally has learned a valuable lesson, "Women never want a sweater just because they're cold." After Wally gets his sweater back, Frances likes him even more and calls the Cleaver home. Wally firmly but politely declines her invitation and asks that she not bother him anymore. Guests: Ann Barnes as Frances Hobbs, Ken Osmond as Eddie Haskell, Carol Sydes as Helen (uncredited).
102	24	"The Hypnotist"	David Butler	Story by : Katherine & Dale Eunson; Teleplay by : Joe Connelly & Bob Mosher	March 12, 1960	13225
Ward is preparing for a Saturday work meeting and the boys go to the movies. Beaver and Larry see The Mad Hypnotist, where a magic amulet is used to hypnotize a lady. At home, Beaver uses a magic "omelet" to hypnotize his family; he is also trying to hypnotize the neighbor's cat when Eddie comes by. Eddie plots to trick the Beaver, but Wally says to leave his brother alone. Eddie backs off but then goes outside and convinces Beaver he has been hypnotized. On Sunday Eddie continues the ruse and scares Beaver and Larry. Beaver is worried he'll be held responsible for Eddie's behavior. He goes home and tries to talk to his father, but Ward is still working and brushes him off. That night Beaver has a nightmare; Wally wakes him and Beaver explains how he hypnotized Eddie. Wally says Eddie is a rat and after school they will fix that wise guy. On Monday, Beaver and Larry are waiting for Eddie – they aren't scared anymore. Beaver instructs Eddie to walk; with Eddie's eyes closed he walks into Wally. Eddie takes off and the others chase him. Eventually Eddie slips on a wet lawn and falls in the mud. The others have a good laugh. Beaver tells Ward what happened and says Wally took care of it by shoving Eddie in the mud. Ward regrets not having time to listen to his children. Guests: Ken Osmond as Eddie Haskell, Rusty Stevens as Larry Mondello.
103	25	"Wally and Alma"	Hugh Beaumont	Joe Connelly & Bob Mosher	March 19, 1960	13227
Wally draws Alma Hanson's name for a forthcoming school picnic. Ward and June insist on Wally's getting in touch early, because "politeness never goes out of style." Then, Alma's mother organizes several dates with Wally for her daughter. Ward wants Wally to date others, but Wally doesn't want to hurt Alma's feelings. Ward suggests that Wally introduce his friends, to get Alma interested in someone else. When Beaver indiscreetly reveals the plot, June is irked. Finally, a snooty Mrs. Hanson, with her feckless husband, appears at the Cleaver house and says Wally spends too much time with her daughter. She asks the Cleavers to hold Wally back so Alma can date others. Ward smiles. Beaver says a girl having her mother pick her boyfriends is like a grown up boy having his mother buy his clothes. Guests: Frank Bank as Lumpy Rutherford, Ken Osmond as Eddie Haskell, Carol Sydes as Alma Hanson, Barry Curtis as Harry Myers, Jean Vander Pyl as Mrs. Hanson, Rod Bell as Mr. Alfred Hanson. In introducing Lumpy to Alma, Wally tells of Lumpy's playing clarinet in the band, which played for the governor in the state capital of Madison.
104	26	"Beaver's Bike"	Hugh Beaumont	Joe Connelly & Bob Mosher	March 26, 1960	13231
With his parents' reluctant permission, Beaver rides his expensive new bike to school. On the way home, outside the drugstore, Beaver lets a strange, but ingratiating, older boy try his new bike. Larry suggests that the boy give it a real tryout, and the boy never returns with the bike. When Beaver comes home after dark, Ward heatedly condemns Beaver's irresponsibility, while Beaver says he delayed coming home because he hoped he would die first. Ward then realizes he forgot to insure the bike and, later, when a policeman visits, that he had also neglected to have it registered. The police recover the bike in poor condition a few days later. Beaver wishes the thief had been captured and punished. Ward assures Beaver that the boy's conscience will punish him every time he steps out of his house, and fears Beaver, Larry, the police, or someone else will spot him as the bicycle thief, but if he truly has no conscience, he will one day land himself in jail. Beaver thinks the kid may be a "wise guy" with no conscience, but the kid later takes flight at the mere sight of Larry. Guests: Rusty Stevens as Larry Mondello, Stanley Fafara as Whitey Whitney, Paul Bryar as Sgt. Peterson, Paul Engle as Bicycle Thief.
105	27	"Wally's Orchid"	Norman Abbott	Bob Ross, Joe Connelly & Bob Mosher	April 2, 1960	13230
Wally is thinking about going to the upcoming sophomore dance on Saturday, but only if he can get Myra to go with him. She is the most popular girl in his class and is used to dating seniors. Wally asks her and she says yes. She calls later and asks if Wally has a car. Ward will drive. She drops a hint that, especially as she's chairing the dance committee, she would like an orchid as her corsage. Wally thinks that will make up for not having a car, but doesn't have $7.50. Ward won't buy the expensive flower; he suggests a gardenia. Beaver brings Mrs. Rayburn's orchid corsage home from school; but, though kept unwrapped in the vegetable crisper, near the salami, it turns brown and falls apart. Ward relents when June shows him the pressed orchid he gave her when she was sixteen. Later, Wally says it wasn't worth it because Myra spent the whole evening dancing with other boys. Guests: Pamela Baird (as Pamela Beaird) as Myra, Dee Carroll as Florist, Ken Osmond as Eddie Haskell, Doris Packer as Mrs. Cornelia Rayburn, Rusty Stevens as Larry Mondello, Sandra Lytle as Judy. Pamela Baird appeared as Wally's girlfriend Mary Ellen Rogers through the series' run.
106	28	"Ward's Baseball"	Earl Bellamy	Joe Connelly & Bob Mosher	April 9, 1960	13228
Ward brings home an autographed baseball, given him by his baseball-playing Uncle Frank when Ward was 17, with a new-made pedestal. He proudly reads off some names on it – Babe Ruth, Lou Gehrig, Lefty Grove, Ki-Ki Cuyler, Augie Galan – and reminisces; but June turns away. Upstairs, the boys take a greater interest. Bill Dickey and Grover Cleveland Alexander are read off, and Beaver is impressed by the baseball-playing president. But Wally says they have "a buncha new guys that'll never be forgotten", to supplant Ward's greats. Later, Larry comes over and insists on playing catch with the major-league ball, even though Beaver knows it's wrong. When Larry overthrows, pretending to be Don Drysdale, the ball is crushed by a truck. Larry tries to recreate the baseball by signing "Baby Ruth" and other mangled names on his own 25¢ hardball. Later, Ward takes the ball out to show Fred Rutherford and the deception is discovered. Ward is disgusted with Beaver and gives him a stiff punishment. Later, when the rest of the family has dinner, Beaver is in his room. Ward is convinced by June and Wally that he is being harsh. Wally, who remembers back to a time when he was in Beaver's shoes, urges Ward to stay firm and not lessen the punishment, or Beaver will lose respect for him. Guests: Richard Deacon as Fred Rutherford, Rusty Stevens as Larry Mondello.
107	29	"Beaver's Monkey"	Norman Abbott	George Tibbles	April 16, 1960	13229
Ward and June object to Beaver having an untamed mouse as a pet, but they say he can have a sensible, domesticated animal. At the market, Beaver sees a home-wanted ad for a free monkey and eagerly answers the ad. Defying all logic, his parents agree to let him keep this monkey, who Beaver names “Stanley” (after Stanley Kowalski from A Streetcar Named Desire) as a pet. Soon, Stanley, a macaque, escapes from his cage and makes a shambles of June's luncheon party and runs away. Later, Beaver finds the monkey outside his window on a rainy night. He is sick. The vet diagnoses pneumonia brought on by being in a too-cold climate. Beaver tends the monkey for days and the animal survives. Beaver wants to send the monkey to his native South America, but Ward has him placed in the monkey exhibit at the zoo, where he recognizes Beaver during a visit. Guests: Norman Leavitt as Veterinarian, Dee Carroll as Luncheon Guest, Mary Alan Hokanson as Luncheon Guest, Rusty Stevens as Larry Mondello.
108	30	"Beaver Finds a Wallet"	David Butler	Story by : Mathilde and Theodore Ferro; Teleplay by : Joe Connelly & Bob Mosher	April 23, 1960	13207
Sent to do June's shopping – when June lets Wally opt out so he can go trampolining with Eddie – Beaver, with Larry, finds a wallet with $89 and takes it to the police. The police tell Beaver that the money will be his if no one claims it after ten days. Beaver makes a list of things he intends to buy. However, Ward insists he also write an ad to put in the paper. Beaver and others call the police station every day to see if the wallet has been claimed. On the tenth day, having gone to the station, Beaver meets a Miss Tomkins who has seen the ad, and is there to claim her wallet. She promises to send Beaver a nice gift as a reward. Days pass with nothing in the mail. At last, a clock-radio arrives for Beaver. Ward tells June he bought the radio to maintain Beaver's faith in human nature. When Beaver writes a thank-you note to Miss Tomkins, Ward takes the note, and tells June he has every intention to send it, so that Miss Tomkins will be reminded of Beaver's good deed. Guests: Rusty Stevens as Larry Mondello, Ken Osmond as Eddie Haskell, Jess Kirkpatrick as Police Sergeant, Valerie Allen as Miss Tomkins, Edith Terry as Secretary.
109	31	"Mother's Day Composition"	Norman Abbott	Bob Ross, Joe Connelly & Bob Mosher	April 30, 1960	13232
Beaver is assigned to write a fifty-word composition about his mother for a school Mother's Day essay. He is to write not of his mother now, but what she did before she got married. June tells Beaver some stories that he feels are enough for his composition. However, at school, after some of the other students read their compositions, he's disappointed with her humdrum life. Beaver secretly crumples up his composition, tells Mrs. Rayburn that he couldn't finish it, and she gives him a one day extension. Beaver decides to make up a story and writes an inaccurate composition describing June as a glamorous show girl who got a big break thanks to a gangster. Mrs. Rayburn realizes the composition has no resemblance to June's life and shows it to June. Ward tells June that Beaver was motivated by love to make his mother the most interesting in the class. Ward then tells Beaver everyone would like to have exciting parents but we have to take them as they come. Guests: Rusty Stevens as Larry Mondello, Stanley Fafara as Whitey Whitney, Jeri Weil as Judy Hensler, Doris Packer as Mrs. Cornelia Rayburn, Richard Correll as Richard Rickover, Bill Baldwin as Frank, Dee Arlen as Laura.
110	32	"Beaver and Violet"	David Butler	Joe Connelly & Bob Mosher	May 7, 1960	13233
Fred Rutherford plans a picnic with the Cleavers, but Beaver isn't too excited since Violet Rutherford is going. The day starts out bad for Beaver when Fred makes Violet sit on Beaver's lap on the car ride to the lake. Fred Rutherford takes a photo of Violet kissing Beaver which then appears on the cover of a publication at Ward's company. Ward and June decide to hide the picture from him, but Beaver finds the newsletter anyway. Beaver is outraged and his classmates tease him about Violet being in love with him. Later, Violet tells Beaver she only kissed him because her father told her to do so, and she really can't stand him. Beaver says he burned the picture and spit on the ashes. Thrilled that neither one likes each other, Beaver tells Violet that she's not too bad for a girl and Violet tells Beaver he's not too bad for a boy. Guests: Richard Deacon as Fred Rutherford, Stanley Fafara as Whitey Whitney, Richard Correll as Richard Rickover, Veronica Cartwright as Violet Rutherford, Majel Barrett as Gwendolyn 'Gwen' Rutherford.
111	33	"The Spot Removers"	Norman Tokar	Bob Ross, Joe Connelly & Bob Mosher	May 14, 1960	13234
Ward comes home to what he terms a Louisa May Alcott scene of domesticity, pots simmering on the range, and June sewing a button on a suit coat that Wally intends to wear to an upcoming party. After coming home from a fishing trip, Beaver and Richard, in turn, ruin Wally's suit. Beaver drapes his dirty, smelly jacket with fishbait-filled pockets over it. Wally is angry, but Beaver is apologetic. After it has been dry cleaned, Richard spills leather oil on it. They try to bleach the oil out, but end up bleaching the color out of Wally's suit as well. Eddie stops by and learns of the disaster, but also sees Beaver reeling with guilt and fear about it. Eddie suggests to Wally that they "go Tony Curtis" and wear sports jackets and slacks, instead of suits, to the party, and thus Wally does not see his ruined suit. June and Ward learn about everything, and June assures Beaver she can dye the suit back to its original color. Ward suggests Beaver keep mum about Eddie's kindness in the incident because Eddie doesn't like others to know he can be a nice guy. Guests: Ken Osmond as Eddie Haskell, Richard Correll as Richard Rickover.
112	34	"Beaver, the Model"	Norman Tokar	Joe Connelly & Bob Mosher	May 21, 1960	13235
Beaver answers an ad looking for models, sending in his photo. Wally and Ward scoff at the initial response, calling it "a come-on", and "a gyp". However, Eddie, claims Ward and Wally only said those things out of jealousy, and others, like Sal Mineo got started that way, and Beaver signs an agreement. However, Beaver doesn't have the $30.00 registration fee the agency requests, leading them to threaten legal action. Fearing possible debtors' prison, Beaver goes to an attorney known to his father, to help him out. The attorney agrees to handle the matter, but not without taking Beaver's savings of forty-six cents, and lecturing him about how whenever he gets himself into a position where he cannot go to his father, it will cost him something. Ward and June later learn of the deal, but decide no further action is needed on their part, as the attorney's lecture taught Beaver his lesson. Beaver declares that he can't wait until he's old enough to not mess things up anymore, but Wally replies that you're never too old to do that. There's a reason Mayfield has three whole buildings full of lawyers. Guests: Ken Osmond as Eddie Haskell, Bartlett Robinson as George Compton, Aline Towne as Secretary.
113	35	"Wally, the Businessman"	Norman Tokar	Joe Connelly & Bob Mosher	May 28, 1960	13236
The summer is approaching, and Wally wants to get a job, which requires Ward to provide legal permission. Wally uses start-up money from Ward to begin an Igloo Bar ice cream business, while trying to rid himself of his pesky brother, who takes too keen an interest. Wally doesn't demand cash up front from his friends and gets himself deeply into debt. Knowing his boss will fire him over his shortage, he becomes nervous. He asks Beaver for a loan, but Beaver is mad at his brother and refuses his request. Later, Wally discovers Beaver has made the loan and his account is marked paid in full by his boss. Ward quotes, "Neither a borrower nor a lender be, for loan oft loses itself and friend". Wally says he didn't expect someone who wrote that junk about Hamlet could have good advice for businessmen. Guests: Ken Osmond as Eddie Haskell, "Tiger" Fafara as Tooey Brown, Buddy Hart as Chester Anderson, Cheryl Holdridge as Gloria Cusick, Rory Stevens as Little Boy, Dana Dillaway as Peggy, Anne Nauseda as Little Girl. Buddy Hart's last appearance as Chester Anderson. Tiger Fafara's last appearance as Tooey Brown.
114	36	"Beaver and Ivanhoe"	David Butler	Joe Connelly & Bob Mosher	June 4, 1960	13237
Miss Landers, back from a recent illness (because Sue Randall had her appendix removed), suggests the class read one more book before summer. Ward considers her list of suggestions - Here Comes Connie, Hoppy the Kangaroo, Little Claude, Penny Bobbins - unmanly and suggests that Beaver read Ivanhoe, one of Ward's favorite childhood books. Beaver becomes engrossed, practices sword fighting with Gilbert, and gets in trouble defending womanhood, fighting a boy who shoves his sister. The girl doesn't defend Beaver when asked why Beaver was beating up her brother, she stating that she and her brother were minding their own business when Beaver started beating him up. Later, learning truly what happened, Miss Landers, despite the fight, praises Beaver in front of the class for his actions. Beaver then creates a brotherhood of knights among his schoolmates. Their first proposed venture is to vanquish the neighborhood bully, Clyde Appleby. When Whitey opts out of the battle, Beaver realizes his honor is at stake and confronts Clyde. Beaver takes a drubbing. Ward tells Beaver Ivanhoe's virtues are still pertinent in the modern world but his violence is not. June tells of how she got in trouble pretending to be Lorna Doone, one of the Little Women, or Becky Sharp. Wally tells Beaver of the disease and cruelty of former times. Beaver says the only way to have fun in the olden days is to read about it. Guests: Sue Randall as Miss Landers, Jeri Weil as Judy Hensler, Stanley Fafara as Whitey Whitney, Stephen Wootton as Clyde Appleby, Stephen Talbot as Gilbert Bates, James Parnell as Mr. Crawford, Bobby Beekman as Harold, Karen Sue Trent as Penny Woods, Neil Seflinger as Boy. Karen Sue Trent's first appearance as Penny Woods. Penny would eventually replace Judy Hensler as Beaver's classroom nemesis.
115	37	"Wally's Play"	David Butler	Story by : George Tibbles; Teleplay by : Joe Connelly & Bob Mosher	June 11, 1960	13203
Wally joins the Crusaders, a letterman club at school, and discovers he is cast as a dance-hall girl in their Old West play. Wally is extremely embarrassed to be cast as a female character. When Beaver finds Wally's costume, he and his parents know why Wally didn't want to talk about it. Ward, who thinks Wally overly-sensitive, finally tells him a fable of a fox stuck in quicksand who coaxes a bear in so that he can climb out. Wally then manages to coax Eddie into taking the role. At the performance, Eddie hams it up to the acclaim of the audience. Wally then wishes he held on to his original role. Ward tells him he could be a bit more like Eddie while June says Eddie could be a lot more like Wally. Guests: Ken Osmond as Eddie Haskell, Stephen Talbot as Gilbert Bates, Tommy Ivo as Harold 'Duke' Hathaway.
116	38	"The Last Day of School"	Norman Abbott	Joe Connelly & Bob Mosher	June 18, 1960	13239
On the phone, June orders handkerchiefs as a last-day-of-school gift for Miss Landers, and a nylon slip for herself, with directions to gift wrap the handkerchiefs. The slip is wrapped by mistake. Beaver and Wally sneak a peek at the gift for Miss Landers. The embarrassed boys find the lacy slip and, not knowing that the department store made a mistake, Beaver gives Miss Landers a postcard instead. The other children are not impressed. Later, Beaver explains his "crummy gift" to Miss Landers and gives her the slip. At home, June has discovered the gift wrapping mistake and offers to call Miss Landers but Beaver says he has straightened it out. Guests: Sue Randall as Miss Landers, Stanley Fafara as Whitey Whitney, Jeri Weil as Judy Hensler, Stephen Talbot as Gilbert Bates, Richard Correll as Richard Rickover.
117	39	"Beaver's Team"	David Butler	Story by : Edward J. O'Connor; Teleplay by : Joe Connelly & Bob Mosher	June 25, 1960	13238
Beaver has formed a football team called the Lightning Eleven, because the name scares kids. It is baseball season, but kids do not care about that. As coach of Beaver's football team, Wally comes up with a diabolical play, a fake hand-off called 'Old 98'. Beaver divulges this secret play to Penny Woods, who, in turn, divulges it to the opposition, the Grant Avenue Tigers. In the big game, the secret play is brought out in the final minutes, but the opposition is waiting for it and soundly trounces Beaver's team. Beaver is disgusted with Penny but Ward tells Beaver he was not a strategic genius in letting her know about the play in the first place. Ward tells Beaver he should not say anything he does not want repeated, especially to girls; but he does not want Beaver to tell his mother that. Guests: Ken Osmond as Eddie Haskell, Stanley Fafara as Whitey Whitney, Stephen Talbot as Gilbert Bates, Richard Correll as Richard Rickover, Karen Sue Trent as Penny Woods, Bobby Beekman as Harry.
