= Werman =

Werman is a surname. Notable people with the surname include:

- Marco Werman, American radio personality
- Tom Werman (born 1945), American record producer
