= Sound Tracks: Music Without Borders =

Sound Tracks: Music Without Borders was a "musical adventure" — a music and travel series on PBS. The one-hour pilot episode aired January 25, 2010 on PBS and a second episode premiered on October 5, 2012.

Following the format of a news magazine show such as 60 Minutes, the Sound Tracks episodes featured three stories and a "global hit" music performance at the end.

Marco Werman of public radio's "The World" was the host, lead reporter and co-creator of the show. Other reporters were Alexis Bloom, Arun Rath and Mirissa Neff. The executive producer and co-creator was Stephen Talbot. Sound Tracks was a co-production of The Talbot Players in San Francisco and KQED, San Francisco. The pilot was done with Oregon Public Broadcasting.

The 2010 pilot included a report about a Vladimir Putin pop propaganda song in Russia; a story about the late Afrobeat star, Fela Kuti, and his son, Seun Kuti, who is following in his father's musical and political footsteps; and how the controversy over the movie Borat led to the creation and performance of a symphony in Kazakhstan by composer Erran Baron Cohen (the brother of Borat actor Sacha Baron Cohen). The program concluded with a "global hit" song by the Portuguese fado star Mariza.

The 2012 episode stars Wynton Marsalis and his Jazz at Lincoln Center Orchestra, singer and human rights activist Youssou N'Dour in Senegal, Scottish folk singer Julie Fowlis who performs the theme song for the Pixar/Disney animated movie Brave, and the Icelandic band Of Monsters and Men.

"Sound Tracks presents Quick Hits" was an online spinoff that showcased music videos and interviews each month on the PBS Arts website from 2010 to 2012. Featured "Quick Hits" artists included Of Monsters and Men, Yuja Wang, Levon Helm, Anoushka Shankar, Milos Karadaglic, Hélène Grimaud, the Carolina Chocolate Drops, Jovanotti, Seu Jorge, KT Tunstall, Ozomatli, Meklit Hadero, Charles Bradley, Dengue Fever, and Seun Kuti, among others. These videos can be seen on the Sound Tracks Quick Hits YouTube Channel.
