= Lisa Mullins =

American public radio personality

Lisa Mullins is an American public radio personality. She is the permanent local weekday host for National Public Radio's All Things Considered for its Boston affiliate WBUR, and guest host for NPR's Here and Now and WBUR's Radio Boston.

== Career ==
From 1996 to 2012, she was the anchor and senior producer of PRI's The World, a public radio program co-produced by Public Radio International, WGBH and the BBC World Service. She anchored the program from Hong Kong when the territory was handed back to China in 1997. She also covered the 1996 Republican National Convention in San Diego, California and anchored that year's presidential election coverage from Washington D.C. In 2012, Mullins won a Gracie Award, which honors women who have made a major contribution to journalism and media programming. She was also a 2010 Nieman Fellow at Harvard University's Nieman Foundation for Journalism.

Mullins has produced reports from China, Albania, Italy, Mexico and Northern Ireland. She has interviewed international figures including U.N. Secretary General Kofi Annan, U.S. Secretary of State Colin Powell and President of Afghanistan Hamid Karzai.

Mullins also hosted the American broadcast of the BBC documentary series The Changing World, a collaboration between the BBC World Service, Public Radio International, and PRI's The World.

Previously, Mullins reported on National Public Radio's Morning Edition, All Things Considered, and Performance Today. For six years, she hosted the American broadcast of the Vienna Philharmonic Orchestra's New Year's Day concert, performed in the Austrian capital.

Lisa Mullins has received the bronze award for "Best Network Anchor" in the New York Festival's international radio competition, and Boston Magazine has honored her with its "Best Radio Voice" award. Her interview with the Episcopal bishop of Honduras, Leo Fradé, won The World the Golden Reel Award in the category "National News and Public Affairs" from the National Federation of Community Broadcasters.
