= The World (radio program) =

Global news radio, audio and multi-platform program

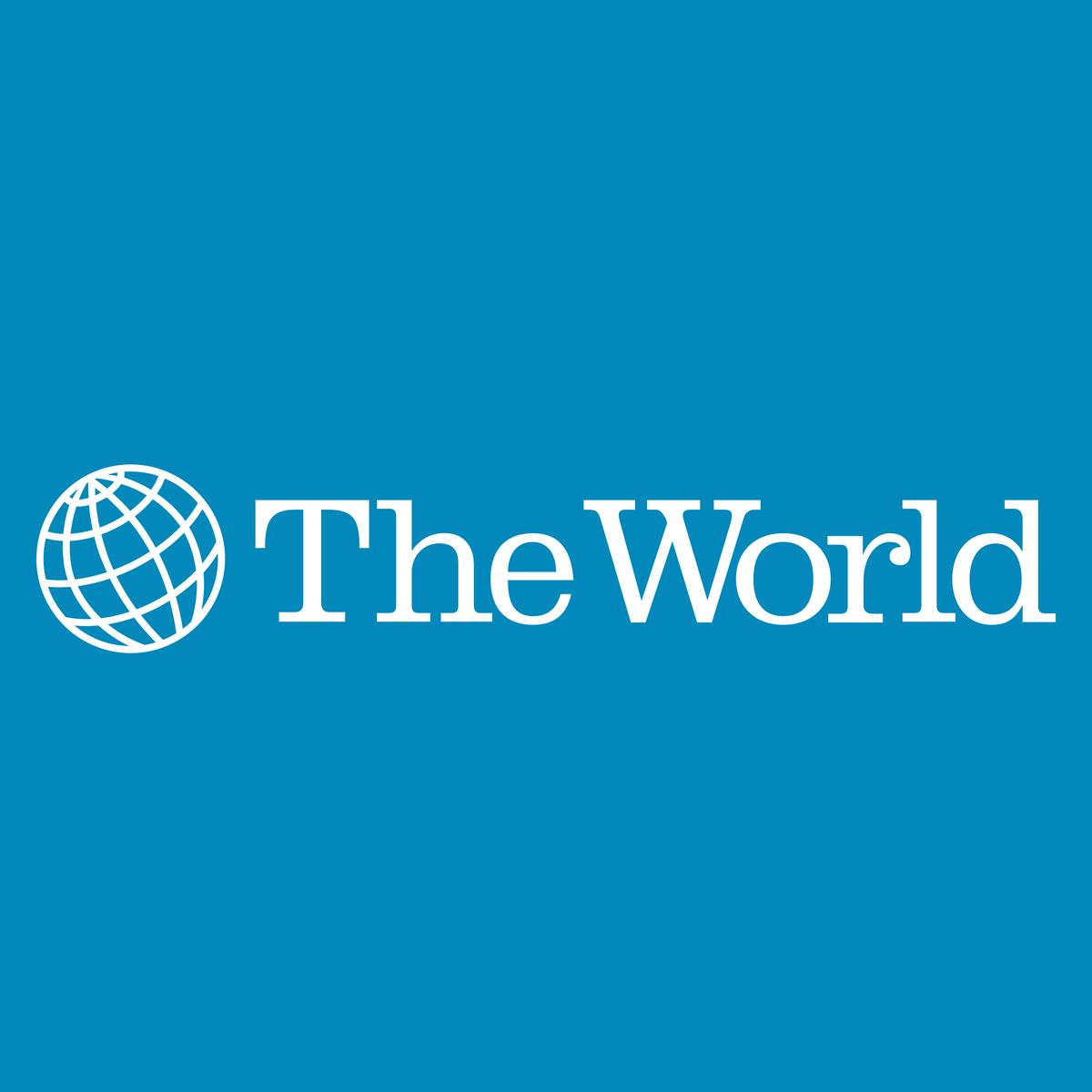
- Genre: International news
- Running time: One hour
- Country of origin: United States
- Home station: WGBH
- Syndicates: Public Radio Exchange
- Hosted by: Marco Werman and Carolyn Beeler
- Created by: Public Radio International
- Directed by: April Peavey
- Produced by: Dan Lothian
- Recording studio: Boston, Massachusetts
- Original release: January 1, 1996 – present
- Website: theworld.org

The World is a public radio international news magazine co-produced by the WGBH Educational Foundation and the Public Radio Exchange (PRX) and co-hosted by Marco Werman and Carolyn Beeler. The show is produced from the Nan and Bill Harris Studios at the WGBH building in Boston, Massachusetts.

== History ==
The World was established by Steve Salyer CEO of Public Radio International and Jerry Timmins Head of Region, Americas at BBC World Service in 1995. PRI brought initial funding and WGBH's Boston production base. The BBC brought access to BBC Newsgathering, BBC World Service staff and a London production base. The programme was initially co-presented from both Boston and London with Eddie Meyer being the first BBC based London host.

In 1997, The World began producing a segment entitled "Global Hit", highlighting musicians and musical trends in the global news context.

Lisa Mullins hosted The World from 1998 to 2013. Since 2010, Werman has stepped in for Mullins as host. Beginning in 2013, he has served as the show's full-time host.

On April 14, 2020, the BBC announced it would end its production partnership on The World effectively July 1; the announcement caused WAMU in Washington, D.C. to move the show back to its 8 p.m. timeslot. The last episode of Boston Calling aired on June 27.

In July 2022, Werman began producing The World from the University of California, San Diego to help develop the university's Democracy Lab. As of June 2023, he broadcasts two days a week from the Department of Communication Social Sciences Research building.

On December 5, 2023, it was announced that The World reporter Carolyn Beeler would join Werman as the program's co-host. Beeler joined The World as a reporter in 2015. At the time of her becoming co-host, she oversaw the show's environmental coverage.

== Production ==
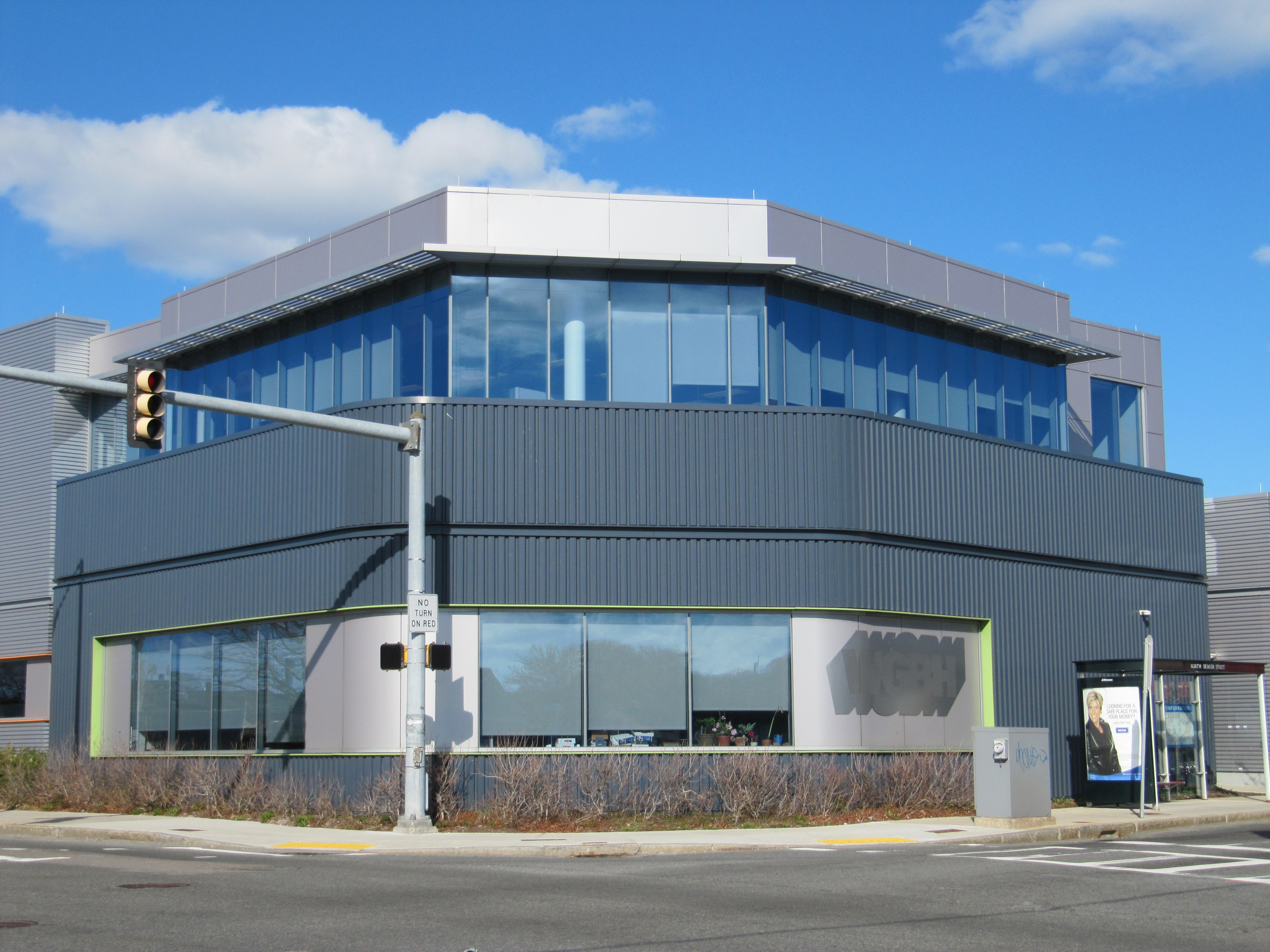
The Nan and Bill Harris Studios in Boston

The World is produced from the Nan and Bill Harris Studios at the WGBH building in Boston, Massachusetts. The show airs on over 300 public radio stations and has 2.5 million weekly listeners. Additionally, portions of The World aired in the United Kingdom as Boston Calling until 2020 and in whole in Canada through CBC Radio One.

The theme music of The World was produced by Eric Goldberg, who received the gig in 1995. In February 2015, the theme was redone to introduce a more contemporary sound with Marco Werman's new role. The current theme was written by Ned Porter.

A new theme song was commissioned in 2019.

== Awards and recognition ==
Several series covered on The World have received awards. In 2006, the four-part series "The Global Race for Stem Cell Therapies" won an Alfred I. duPont-Columbia University Award and a National Journalism Award in 2006. That same year, "The Forgotten Plague: Malaria" received a Public Communications Award from the American Society for Microbiology and "Hiroshima's Survivors: The Last Generation" was recognized by the Dart Center for Journalism and Trauma.

== See also ==
- Institute for Nonprofit News (member)
