= Leave It to Beaver season 2 =

Leave It to Beaver
- Season 2
- Title screen
- No. of episodes: 39

Release
- Original network: ABC
- Original release: October 2, 1958 – June 25, 1959

Season chronology
- ← Previous; Season 1 Next → Season 3

The second season of the American television situation comedy Leave It to Beaver premiered on October 2, 1958 and concluded on June 25, 1959. It consisted of 39 episodes shot in black-and-white, each running approximately 25 minutes in length. This was the first season that the show was originally aired on ABC after the first season was televised on CBS.

== Episodes ==
No. overall	No. in season	Title	Directed by	Written by	Original release date	Prod. code
40	1	"Beaver's Poem"	Norman Tokar	Joe Connelly, Bob Mosher, Dick Conway & Roland MacLane	October 2, 1958	936A
Beaver needs to write a poem for a school assignment. But he waits until the last minute the night before to start. To make his own life easier, Ward writes the poem after Beaver goes to bed. The next day, Wally announces Beaver has been chosen to read his poem in assembly and will be given an award. Ward and June discourage Beaver from accepting an award for a poem he did not write. Ward talks to Mrs. Rayburn who decides to give Beaver another chance to write a poem. Guests: Doris Packer as Mrs. Cornelia Rayburn, Rusty Stevens as Larry Mondello.
41	2	"Eddie's Girl"	Norman Tokar	Joe Connelly & Bob Mosher	October 9, 1958	955A
Eddie tells Wally and Beaver that he has a new girl named Caroline Cunningham. Even though Eddie takes Wally over to Caroline's house, Wally is suspicious that Eddie doesn't really even know her. When Caroline comes to meet them, it is obvious that Eddie and Caroline have not formally met and that Caroline has no interest whatsoever in Eddie. Caroline is more interested in Wally and wants to invite him to a dance. Mrs. Cunningham and June arrange the date between Caroline and Wally. Wally gets angry at their interference, and refuses to go. However, Eddie at the last hour complains of a sore throat and urges Wally to take Caroline to the dance, which Wally then agrees to do. Later, Eddie tells Beaver he knew Wally would not go to a dance with someone else's girl, so he pretended to be sick to give Wally the chance to accept the invitation. Guests: Ken Osmond as Eddie Haskell, Karen Green as Caroline Cunningham, Aline Towne as Mrs. Cunningham.
42	3	"Ward's Problem"	Norman Tokar	Story by : Ed James; Teleplay by : Joe Connelly & Bob Mosher	October 16, 1958	940A
Ward makes plans to take Wally fishing, a trip which Ward has already postponed three times. Beaver comes home with news about a school father-and-student picnic on the same day and Ward now feels he must go to the picnic. The next morning arrives with Ward already gone to work, and Wally still believing that his father is taking him fishing. Although Ward told Beaver that he would go to the picnic, Ward failed to sign the permission slip, making Beaver believe that Ward will instead spend the day with Wally. Beaver tells Miss Landers he will be the only student not to attend the picnic, because his father has an "important business trip". Ward realizes by stalling he placed Beaver in an awkward position. Guests: Sue Randall as Miss Landers, Rusty Stevens as Larry Mondello, Stanley Fafara as Whitey Whitney, Jeri Weil as Judy Hensler, Bobby Mittelstaedt as Charles Fredericks, Patty Turner as Linda Dennison. First appearance for Sue Randall as Beaver's third grade teacher, Miss Landers. Crystal Falls is 60 miles from Mayfield in this episode. In a later episode, "The Bus Ride", it's 90 miles.
43	4	"Beaver and Chuey"	Norman Tokar	George Tibbles	October 23, 1958	942A
Beaver makes friends with Chuey, a South American boy who only speaks Spanish. Beaver consults Eddie (who's taking Spanish in high school) about Spanish phrases. Eddie teaches Beaver an insulting phrase without revealing its meaning. When Beaver uses the phrase with his friend, the boy runs home crying. Chuey's parents come by wanting to know why their son was so upset. Beaver tells them what he said and they leave upset. Wally tells Ward that it was Eddie that taught Beaver the phrase. Ward writes a letter to Chuey's parents. The misunderstanding is corrected and Wally resolves to "slug" Eddie. Guests: Ken Osmond as Eddie Haskell, Alan Roberts Costello as Roberto "Chuey" Varella, Mary Andre as Carmella Varella, Abel Franco as Enrico Varella.
44	5	"The Lost Watch"	Norman Tokar	Richard Baer	October 30, 1958	943A
When Wally's friends ask Beaver to guard their personal belongings during a game of baseball, Lumpy accuses Beaver of losing his watch and demands restitution. He gives Beaver forty-eight hours to return the watch — or else. Beaver never had the watch but takes the twenty-five dollar savings bond his Aunt Martha gave him and tries to redeem it at the bank. The teller calls Ward. Ward gets the truth about the matter from Beaver. Ward then calls Fred Rutherford and Fred says his son lost the watch two weeks ago. Fred has Lumpy apologize to the Cleavers. Guests: Richard Deacon as Fred Rutherford, Rusty Stevens as Larry Mondello, Frank Bank as Lumpy Rutherford, Buddy Hart as Chester Anderson, "Tiger" Fafara as Tooey Brown, Jonathan Hole as Bank Teller. Lumpy is a junior in high school while Wally is a freshman. In later seasons, they are in the same grade with Lumpy being "held back" as the reason.
45	6	"Her Idol"	Norman Tokar	Story by : Dick Conway & Roland MacLane; Teleplay by : Joe Connelly & Bob Mosher, Dick Conway & Roland MacLane	November 6, 1958	946A
Beaver is bothered by the fact that Linda Dennison, a girl in his class, is always staring at him. What he is unaware of is that Linda likes him. Beaver sits in a tree with Linda to view a bird's nest in the park. Larry and Whitey tease Beaver about Linda being his girl. Beaver doesn't want to hurt her feelings; but, to prove he's not sweet on Linda, he calls her a "smelly old ape". The next day, Miss Landers gives the class a talk about boys and girls extending mutual respect to one another and getting along. When Beaver sees Linda with Larry in the same tree, he feels bad and wonders if the feeling is that which causes people to marry. Guests: Rusty Stevens as Larry Mondello, Patty Turner as Linda Dennison, Sue Randall as Miss Landers, Stanley Fafara as Whitey Whitney, Jeri Weil as Judy Hensler, Susan Marshall as Girl.
46	7	"Beaver's Ring"	Norman Tokar	Story by : Ed James; Teleplay by : Joe Connelly & Bob Mosher	November 13, 1958	953A
Aunt Martha sends Beaver an heirloom ring that once belonged to Beaver's namesake, his great-uncle Theodore. Ward tells Beaver not to wear it to school so Beaver takes it in his pocket. Judy claims the ring really isn't Beaver's. If he wants to prove it, Judy says Beaver should put it on to see if it fits. Beaver puts it on and cannot get it off. The school nurse says it will have to be cut off. Beaver panics, thinking the nurse means his finger. The ring is cut off. At home, Beaver writes a letter of apology to Aunt Martha telling his father it's "awful hard" to write a letter saying you're bad. Ward tears up the letter, deciding Beaver has been punished enough, and tells Beaver they might be able to get the ring fixed. Guests: Rusty Stevens as Larry Mondello, Stanley Fafara as Whitey Whitney, Jeri Weil as Judy Hensler, Sue Randall as Miss Landers, Anne Loos as Nurse Thompson. Aunt Martha is Beaver's godmother as well as great aunt. Wally and Beaver have an Uncle Frank.
47	8	"The Shave"	Norman Tokar	Bob Ross, Joe Connelly & Bob Mosher	November 20, 1958	950A
Wally scores a touchdown in a junior varsity game, but his friends' shaving is the bigger brag. Wally cuts himself prematurely shaving with Ward's safety razor. Ward tells him that shaving will make the hairs come in thicker, which just encourages Wally to shave more often. Needing his razor, Ward finds Wally shaving and bawls him out in front of Eddie, saying that Wally should not be shaving until he has a beard. Later, Ward realizes he was thoughtless. The next day, Wally and his friends go to the barber shop for haircuts. Ward arranges for the barber to give Wally a shave without divulging his part in the plot. The barber recommends a shave and Wally becomes the envy of his pals. Guests: Ken Osmond as Eddie Haskell, Buddy Hart as Chester Anderson, "Tiger" Fafara as Tooey Brown, Howard McNear as Andy the Barber, Frank Bank as Lumpy Rutherford, Charles Cirillo as Barber. Eddie dreams of attending the Naval Academy. Eddie's father owns his own business. Howard McNear would play Floyd Lawson, the Mayberry barber on The Andy Griffith Show
48	9	"The Pipe"	Norman Tokar	Story by : Fran Van Hartesveldt; Teleplay by : Joe Connelly & Bob Mosher	November 27, 1958	944A
The Rutherfords send the Cleavers an elaborately carved meerschaum pipe from Germany. Fred writes that a "rubescent chromaticity" results from "geschmokhen", but the pipe is put in a curio cabinet. When Larry and Beaver are alone, Larry smokes some coffee grounds in the pipe. He offers it to Beaver, but Beaver turns him down. They are disgusted. The next day, they both try to smoke cigarette ashes collected from ashtrays around Larry's house and are disgusted again. Beaver uses June's air freshener to hide the smell. June smells the air freshener, and Ward discovers the stained pipe bowl and believes Wally has been smoking it. He presses Wally into telling him about it, until Beaver confesses that he and Larry did it, and says he "won't do anything bad again until I'm 21". Ward assures Beaver he will be punished, and Larry's father will be informed. Ward will need to find a way to apologize to Wally. Beaver suggests he should be the one to say, "I'm sorry." Guest: Rusty Stevens as Larry Mondello. Gift comes from Fred and Gwendolyn Rutherford.
49	10	"Wally's New Suit"	Norman Tokar	Richard Baer	December 4, 1958	949A
Wally needs a new suit for a dance and, egged on by Eddie, persuades his father to let him buy it himself. Against his better judgement, Ward agrees. Wally buys a loud plaid suit his parents dislike. Conversely, Eddie, Tooey and Beaver love it. Tactfully, June notes the sleeves are too long and suggests the suit be altered. The clothier knows boy psychology and steers Wally to a traditional suit, pointing out that the suit flatters his athletic build. Wally says he would have felt like a creep wearing the plaid suit. Ward tells June he's learned that often the subtle approach works better. Guests: "Tiger" Fafara as Tooey Brown, John Hoyt as Clothier, Ken Osmond as Eddie Haskell (uncredited).
50	11	"School Play"	Norman Tokar	Joe Connelly & Bob Mosher	December 11, 1958	957A
Grant Avenue School is holding a performing arts festival and the third grade is doing a production of "Flowers and Feathers". Beaver is cast as a canary in the school play. After the first rehearsal, Miss Wakeland, the director, doesn't think Beaver has what it takes to be a convincing canary, which he overhears. Ward's attempt at words of encouragement, in addition to Miss Wakeland's comments, makes Beaver have a bad case of stage fright on opening night. The teachers switch Beaver and Whitey at the last moment with Beaver being assigned the silent and immobile mushroom role. At home, Beaver tells his family he was not good enough to be the canary and he was not disappointed being the mushroom because a "guy oughta do what he can do, not what another guy can do". Guests: Sue Randall as Miss Landers, Dorothy Adams as Miss Wakeland, Stanley Fafara as Whitey Whitney, Jeri Weil as Judy Hensler, Rusty Stevens as Larry Mondello, Linda Beardon as Girl. Larry Mondello's father is often referenced in the show but makes his only appearance (silent) in the series in the backstage scene. Judy Hensler's parents appear in the episode as well.
51	12	"The Visiting Aunts"	Norman Tokar	Story by : Bob Ross; Teleplay by : Joe Connelly & Bob Mosher	December 18, 1958	951A
With free tickets from Tooey, and Ward offering to drive them to and from, Wally and Beaver have their Saturday all planned out to attend the last day of a carnival in Garden Grove. But they are forced to stay home when Aunt Martha arrives with a friend, the formidable wife of a general. Wally and Beaver do whatever they can to speed up Aunt Martha's visit, all the while trying to be polite. The politeness doesn't come through. When the ladies depart after lunch, Ward offers to drive the boys to the carnival but they sulk. June says she is very unhappy with their attitude, pointing out that she does not often ask them to sacrifice their day for her. The boys apologize to their mother and a family outing to the carnival is decided upon. Guests: Madge Kennedy as Aunt Martha, Irene Tedrow as Mrs. Hathaway, "Tiger" Fafara as Tooey Brown, Buddy Hart as Chester Anderson, Frank Bank as Lumpy Rutherford.
52	13	"Happy Weekend"	Norman Tokar	Joe Connelly & Bob Mosher	December 25, 1958	959A
Ward wants the boys to have a rustic, outdoor weekend at Shadow Lake, reminiscent of his youth. The boys are less than excited as they want to stay in town to watch a movie playing at the cinema. Ward says it will be good to get away from all those movies and comic books. After the initial thrill of country living, the boys eat at a drugstore, Ward discovers the lodge charges for each stocked fish caught, and June goes into town to get her hair done. Ward finds the boys watching the movie he had kept them from seeing, from a hilltop overlooking a drive-in. Ward feels perhaps he cannot go back and relive his childhood with his boys. He decides to pack up and return home. The boys change his mind when they discover an island in the lake and want to build a pirate's raft. Guest: Harry O. Tyler as Boat Manager.
53	14	"Wally's Present"	Norman Tokar	Story by : Keith Fowler & Norman Paul; Teleplay by : Joe Connelly, Bob Mosher, Keith Fowler & Norman Paul	January 1, 1959	945A
Wally plans his birthday around a hamburger party at the drugstore with Eddie and some girls, eschewing a regular birthday party and leaving Beaver out of the fun. With Larry Mondello as instigator, Beaver takes his revenge by spending his saved money mostly on a bow and arrow set for himself, which Larry quickly breaks. Beaver then buys his brother a cheap toy, instead of the camera with flash he had intended to buy. Wally, however, changes his mind and decides to have a small party, which includes the Beaver. It's now too late for Beaver to make amends with a nice gift. Wally also invites the Beaver to accompany him and Eddie to the movie. The Beaver somehow has to relieve his feeling of guilt but also has some explaining to his parents who don't see a camera when Wally opens the Beaver's present. Beaver apologizes to Wally for his selfishness. Guests: Rusty Stevens as Larry Mondello, Ken Osmond as Eddie Haskell, Arthur Space as Mr. Judson. Though Wally's birthday is celebrated, his age is not stated (but there are 14 candles on his cake). The Cleavers have an "Uncle Tom in Florida" who sends Wally a pen for his birthday.
54	15	"The Grass is Always Greener"	Norman Tokar	Story by : John Whedon; Teleplay by : Joe Connelly & Bob Mosher	January 8, 1959	947A
Larry tells of the virtues of eavesdropping. Beaver hears Ward, paying bills, talk about soon being in the poorhouse. Beaver wants to get to know the poor. Beaver gets permission to ride in the garbage truck of Mr. Fletcher, then goes to the garbage man's house to play with his sons. He comes home in a Rolls-Royce and thrilled with his visit. June suggests he invite the garbage man's boys to lunch. The Fletcher boys arrive at the Cleaver house well-groomed and polite, rather than grimy and disorderly as she expected. The boys think Ward is a great guy and June as pretty as a movie star. Wally and Beaver now see their parents in a different light. June and Ward are glad the boys have visited. Guests: Billy Chapin as Chris Fletcher, Rusty Stevens as Larry Mondello, Don Lyon as Pete Fletcher, Jesse Kirkpatrick as Henry Fletcher, Helen Jay as Woman, Edward Marr as Traffic Policeman.
55	16	"The Boat Builders"	Norman Tokar	Joe Connelly & Bob Mosher	January 15, 1959	958A
Although his parents tell him not to, Wally takes the kayak he built with his friends to Miller's Pond to see if it floats. Beaver is the only one small enough to fit in the boat's small opening. The kayak tips over and Beaver is drenched. At home, the boys hide the mishap from their parents. Wally puts Beaver's clothing and new hiking boots on the furnace to dry. Later, Ward finds the clothing smoldering, and, when he learns the truth, gives the boys a severe lecture on the possible consequences of their adventure and, worse, on keeping it from their parents. He grounds the two for the weekend, which they spend reviving Beaver's boots. June is just thankful Beaver was not hurt in the mishap. Guests: "Tiger" Fafara as Tooey Brown, Buddy Hart as Chester Anderson.
56	17	"Beaver Plays Hooky"	Norman Tokar	Story by : Dick Conway & Roland MacLane; Teleplay by : Joe Connelly & Bob Mosher, Dick Conway & Roland MacLane	January 22, 1959	960A
Beaver and Larry stop too long to watch construction, where their lunch boxes and books are run over. Arriving at school past the second bell, the two decide to play hooky to avoid facing the wrath of Miss Landers three times in one week. After hiding in the frame a billboard for a while, they get hungry and go to a supermarket hoping to find free food samples. Lured by an offer of free "rocket bars", the boys, unbeknownst, get in line to be in a noontime live television show audience at the store; and they are caught on camera. Wally, home sick, and June see the boys on TV. June calls Ward at the office, and he picks up a candy-sick Beaver. He drops him at school to talk to Miss Landers who impresses upon the boy the importance of attending school. Guests: Dick Lane as Marshall Moran, Rusty Stevens as Larry Mondello, Sue Randall as Miss Landers, John Hart as Construction Worker, Robert Mitchell as Husband at Supermarket, Berniece Dalton as Wife at Supermarket. Episode takes place on a Thursday. Dick Lane, co-author of the episode story and teleplay, appears as Marshall Moran.
57	18	"The Garage Painters"	Norman Tokar	Joe Connelly & Bob Mosher	January 29, 1959	961A
With the family facing a rainy weekend with the television broken, Ward introduces the boys to the book, The Adventures of Tom Sawyer. When he's called to a meeting at the country club just as he begins painting the garage doors, the boys offer to do the job. The boys play Tom Sawyer and try to get friends to paint the doors. Lumpy and Larry will not bite; but little Benjie Bellamy does, and winds up pouring a can of green paint over himself. Wally and Beaver are sent to their room to take a bath. June worries that they'll start cussing, smoking, and ditching school, like Tom Sawyer did. Ward tells the boys that the things you could do in Tom Sawyer's day you cannot get away with now. Guests: Rusty Stevens as Larry Mondello, Frank Bank as Lumpy Rutherford, Sara Anderson as Mrs. Bellamy, Joey Scott as Benjie Bellamy.
58	19	"Wally's Pug Nose"	Norman Tokar	George Tibbles	February 5, 1959	963A
Wally is concerned with his looks, applying lotion to keep from going bald. The guys have their eyes on the cute new girl at school, Gloria Cusick (Cheryl Holdridge), who has asked about Wally. Sitting in the cafeteria, Lumpy and Tooey dare Wally to go over and talk to her. She is pleasant but comments on Wally's "pug nose". Thinking it a disparaging term, he buys a gadget to turn it into a Roman nose. Ward tries to build Wally's confidence but just adds to Wally's anxiety. One day, Gloria asks Wally to escort her to a school dance. He asks why she chose him and she says it's because of his cute pug nose. Wally is happy and throws away the nose gadget. Ward tells Beaver that homely people can be successful too. Guests: Cheryl Holdridge as Gloria Cusick, "Tiger" Fafara as Tooey Brown, Frank Bank as Lumpy Rutherford, Ralph Brooks as Mailman. Cheryl Holdridge will make one more appearance as Gloria Cusick then will be re-cast as Wally's girlfriend, Julie Foster. Lumpy is spending his second year as a sophomore.
59	20	"Beaver's Pigeons"	David Butler	Joe Connelly & Bob Mosher	February 12, 1959	962A
Beaver, Larry, and Whitey form a pigeon club. Beaver has picked out two female pigeons at the pet shop, and rushes Ward into agreeing to buying them, having named them "Miss Canfield" and "Miss Landers". Beaver gets the chicken pox, stays in bed, and Wally is assigned to care for the pigeons in the garage until Beaver recovers. Larry, about to go on a trip and accompanied by Whitey, drops off his pigeons, "Nate" and "Al", who soon give Beaver's pigeons lice. The lice cured, a cat gets in and kills two birds, which turn out to be Beaver's. Beaver watches from an upstairs window as his fellow club members bury the birds in the back yard. Ward offers to bring Beaver another pair of pigeons, but Beaver declines. Guests: Rusty Stevens as Larry Mondello, Stanley Fafara as Whitey Whitney.
60	21	"The Tooth"	David Butler	Story by : Bob Ross; Teleplay by : Bob Ross, Joe Connelly & Bob Mosher	February 19, 1959	952A
Beaver has a sore tooth and a small cavity is diagnosed during an exciting visit to the dentist. Excitement turns into apprehension when Lumpy, vengeful at being called that by a "little squirt", tells Beaver how dentists like drilling big holes and repeatedly makes scary drilling sounds. Beaver is further sickened at the sound of nearby jackhammers. Beaver's ruse to prevent a follow-up appointment to fill the tooth is foiled by June who tells Ward of Beaver's fear. Ward is contemptuously dismissive, and firmly tells Beaver he expects him to be a good soldier and not to let him down. At the dentist's office, Beaver and Ward find Fred Rutherford and his daughter Violet in the waiting room. Fred brags about his daughter's Trojan courage. Beaver yelps in mere apprehension of the dentist's chair. The kindly, shrewd dentist allays Beaver's fear and the operation is indeed painless. At home, Ward apologizes to Beaver, saying he should have offered reassurance rather than pressure. Guests: Richard Deacon as Fred Rutherford, Frank Wilcox as Dr. Frederick W. Harrison, Rusty Stevens as Larry Mondello, Veronica Cartwright as Violet Rutherford, Frank Bank as Lumpy Rutherford, Alice Backes as Nurse.
61	22	"Beaver Gets Adopted"	Norman Tokar	Joe Connelly & Bob Mosher	February 26, 1959	954A
During Mayfield Park field day, Wally wins an impressive trophy for most total points scored; and Ward declares a decathlete in the making. Beaver jealously pronounces the trophy "not real gold". Ward reprimands Beaver, saying it's not what it's made of but what it represents. Beaver later accidentally breaks Wally's trophy. The breakage is discovered, despite a clumsy mending attempt; and Beaver's parents scold him. He says he's tired of being yelled at. Ward says if he can improve on his parents, then he's welcome to try. Beaver goes to an adoption agency and asks for new parents. The interviewer says she knows the perfect couple and makes a telephone call. Beaver begins to worry about liking his new parents. Shortly, June and Ward appear at the door. Beaver says he'll take them. Guests: Lurene Tuttle as Mrs. Brady, Lee Torrance as Miss Walker, Rusty Stevens as Larry Mondello.
62	23	"The Haunted House"	Norman Tokar	George Tibbles	March 5, 1959	964A
Beaver has had a bad dream involving a haunted house with ghosts. Elderly Miss Cooper returns to Mayfield to re-open her ancestral home, which looks spooky after being unoccupied for 15 years. When Miss Cooper comes onto her porch—carrying a broom and wearing a knotted, light-colored head scarf—Beaver sees a witch with horns and flaming hair. Miss Cooper, through June, arranges for Beaver to walk her dog. Beaver goes to the house but then runs away, spooked by creaking noises, odd-looking covered furniture, and by his own reflection. Everyone tells Beaver Miss Cooper is a very pleasant lady, but Beaver is disbelieving, even after Miss Cooper visits the Cleavers. The next day, Beaver meets Miss Cooper in the pet shop, finds she's a nice person, and is glad to walk her male Cocker Spaniel, Angela. Guests: Lillian Bronson as Miss Cooper, Rusty Stevens as Larry Mondello. The "Cooper house" would become the Munster mansion in The Munsters, another Joe Connelly & Bob Mosher production.
63	24	"The Bus Ride"	Norman Tokar	Joe Connelly & Bob Mosher	March 12, 1959	967A
Beaver's old friend Billy Payton lives ninety miles away at Crystal Falls and invites Beaver for a weekend visit. When June and Ward realize they have a prior engagement, Wally offers to accompany Beaver on the bus, drop him at Crystal Falls, and return home. On the bus, the boys work through their packed lunches well before lunchtime and get off to eat when the bus stops for refreshments. Beaver and Wally become separated when Wally pays the check while Beaver buys some comic books. Not being clear in asking for directions from the newsstand attendant, Beaver boards the wrong bus and returns to Mayfield, taking a cab home from the bus station. In Crystal Falls, Wally explains the situation to the Paytons. Mr. Payton decides to drive Wally home and pick up Beaver. Not knowing about the mix-up, Ward and June thank Wally for being so responsible. Wally tells Ward what really happened and Ward says that they won't mention it to June. Guests: Yvonne White as Bus Passenger, Douglas Evans as Bus Passenger, Bill Idelson as Newsstand Man, Edward Marr as Mr. Payton, Frank Sully as Cab Driver.
64	25	"Beaver and Gilbert"	Norman Tokar	Teleplay by : Joe Connelly, Bob Mosher and George Tibbles	March 19, 1959	966A
At school, Larry and Whitey commiserate with Beaver about the "dumb new kid" having moved in across the street from the Cleavers. At home, Beaver's parents encourage him to go over and introduce himself. Beaver finds the new kid, Gilbert, training for the 1968 Olympics, and hears many tales about Gilbert's and his family's glamorous accomplishments. Back home, Wally says, "Baloney!", but Beaver is smitten. The next day, having rudely dismissed Larry, Beaver waits in vain for Gilbert, to go to the movies as they'd planned. But Gilbert went to the movies with Larry and Whitey, and now they're playing football. Ward tells Beaver to quit sulking and join in the game. Beaver comes running back crying after a vicious tackle and Ward tells him that he has to expect to be tackled when playing football. Ward also tells him instead of crying he should do something about it. Beaver then gets the better of a fight he picks with Gilbert, Ward and Mr. Gates coming up at the same time to separate the boys. Ward learns from Mr. Gates that the Gates family has moved often in line with his work as a professional flutist, and Gilbert, perpetually the new boy, makes up stories to hold the interest of others. Beaver realizes he himself can be pretentious when unsure of himself and sees Gilbert differently. Guests: Rusty Stevens as Larry Mondello, Carleton G. Young as John Gates, Stanley Fafara as Whitey Whitney, Stephen Talbot as Gilbert Gates. Gilbert's first appearance. His name would be changed to Gilbert Bates.
65	26	"Price of Fame"	Norman Tokar	Story by : Dick Conway & Roland MacLane; Teleplay by : Joe Connelly & Bob Mosher	March 26, 1959	956A
Beaver and Larry stay after school by themselves to clean the blackboards. Larry, having recently been sent to the principal for punishment, tells a tale of a "spanking machine" that Mrs. Rayburn keeps to use on older boys. On his way out of the school, alone, Beaver looks for this nonexistent device, and winds up being locked in when the janitor comes by. Finding no other method of getting out, Beaver pulls the fire alarm. The Mayfield Fire Department rescues Beaver and takes him home in a fire truck. Beaver is excited, but Ward is furious and warns Beaver against making himself "conspicuous". The next day, Saturday, Beaver, while looking for a four-leaf clover, gets his head stuck between the bars in a park fence. He tells Wally, who has been sent to look for him, not to call the police or fire departments, that he does not want to become conspicuous again. Ward, saying everyone can blame him later for scaring his son, finds a gardener, who frees Beaver. Ward reminds Beaver always to call his parents when he's in trouble. Beaver says he'll be calling frequently while growing up. Guests: Rusty Stevens as Larry Mondello, Jeri Weil as Judy Hensler, Bill Erwin as Gardener.
66	27	"A Horse Named Nick"	Norman Tokar	Story by : Hugh Beaumont; Teleplay by : Joe Connelly & Bob Mosher	April 2, 1959	968A
Beaver and Wally do chores at a carnival at Metzger's Field, making Ward feel nostalgic about his youth. The boys, promised $10 apiece, are instead given an old circus horse named Nicholas. They put Nick in the garage and worry when the horse lies down, but Gus the Fireman tells them that horses will do that. A man from the Board of Health tells Ward he faces a fine for having the animal. Knowing they cannot keep Nick, the boys put out an ad, but refuse to sell to a renderer when they find out what he will do to Nicholas. Ward contacts Mr. Payton (the father of Beaver's old friend Billy) who agrees to board Nick on his farm at Crystal Falls. Mr. Payton says the boys may visit the horse any time they wish. Turns out Ward will pay Mr. Payton for the horse's room and board. June tells Ward he's a very nice man, but Ward says he's just a sentimental old farmboy. Guests: Burt Mustin as Gus the Fireman, Bill Baldwin as Board of Health Official, Mike Ross as Mr. Johnson, the renderer. Hugh Beaumont penned the story for this episode.
67	28	"Beaver's Hero"	Norman Tokar	Joe Connelly & Bob Mosher	April 9, 1959	948A
Assistant-principal Mr. Willet, subbing for Miss Landers, gives a compelling talk on World War II. The students begin bragging about their fathers' roles. Beaver brags to his classmates that his father has plenty of war trophies. Mr. Willet asks Beaver to bring some trophies to school, to show. At home, Beaver looks through Ward's old trunk, but only finds surveying equipment. Ward tells him he was in the Seabees and built bases. Nevertheless, Beaver and Wally forge a letter from Ward describing a dangerous war mission. Ward finds the letter and calls Beaver's teacher before the boy gets in too deep. In school, the teacher avoids the topic of the war. Later, Ward tells Beaver that he was placed where he could do the most good, but he appreciates Beaver wanting to see him as a hero. Beaver later tells Wally that he doesn't think he will "jazz things up" anymore. Guests: Wendell Holmes as Mr. Willet, Jeri Weil as Judy Hensler, Stanley Fafara as Whitey Whitney, Stephen Talbot as Gilbert Bates, Bobby Mittelstaedt as Charles Fredericks.
68	29	"Beaver Says Good-bye"	Norman Tokar	George Tibbles, Joe Connelly & Bob Mosher	April 16, 1959	969A
The Cleavers go house hunting in Madison, which would mean new schools. After his father tells him he made an offer on the house, Beaver tells his classmates he's going to move. One morning Ward says the owner accepted another, cash, offer. Later that morning Beaver's class, having secretly planned a farewell party for him, sing him a song and give him going-away gifts. Beaver does not know how to tell his classmates, without feeling dumb and spoiling their joy, that he will not be moving. After the party, embarrassed, he takes the gifts home. Larry drops by and Ward tells him they will not be moving. Larry believes Beaver lied to get presents. The next day, the class shuns Beaver. Miss Landers says Beaver has brought their gifts unopened back to school. Beaver wonders why the class was glad to see him go and angry that he stayed. Ward says Beaver disturbed their thinking. Ward says that when the children thought Beaver was leaving, they wanted to do something nice for him. And when he wasn't going away, it seemed to them that all their nice thoughts were for nothing. Guests: Sue Randall as Miss Landers, Rusty Stevens as Larry Mondello, Stanley Fafara as Whitey Whitney, Jeri Weil as Judy Hensler, Bobby Mittelstaedt as Charles Fredericks, Rodney Bell as Mr. Church.
69	30	"Beaver's Newspaper"	Norman Tokar	Elon Packard, Harry Winkler, Joe Connelly & Bob Mosher	April 23, 1959	970A
Thinking that the boys are growing apart, June asks them to clean out the garage together. Beaver and Wally find an old typewriter, given to Wally as junk. Beaver and Larry take it to Gus, who fixes it with his "special oil". They then decide to start their own newspaper. Larry becomes sick, and Beaver types the newspaper at home with the help of Wally, who initially resents the appropriation of his typewriter; and the two manage to sell the copies. Beaver plans another edition; but, the next day, Wally has a ball game and cannot help Beaver. June fills in. Ward later tells Beaver he should not expect his mother to help because she has other household duties. Beaver does not want to give up the paper and be a quitter. So Ward, saying that failed newspapers have a way of ending their runs respectably, types 'Final Edition' at the head of the page in Beaver's typewriter. Guests: Burt Mustin as Gus the Fireman, Rusty Stevens as Larry Mondello.
70	31	"Beaver's Sweater"	Norman Tokar	Katherine and Dale Eunson	April 30, 1959	971A
Beaver and Larry see an Eskimo-sweater – from the new, 49th state – in a store window. Larry thinks they should each have a sweater like that. Beaver talks his parents into buying it – even though, at $12.98, it's an extravagant whim – because June remembers being hurt by her parents when she was denied a gaudy, opal ring she once wanted. At school, Larry has been denied his sweater; and Beaver sees Judy wearing the same sweater as his. He now believes he's bought a girl's garment and tries various ruses to keep his parents from finding out he no longer is wearing it, finally ridding himself of the sweater by stuffing it behind a candy machine at the movies. The theater manager, finding a name tag, alerts the Cleavers. June reasons Beaver made a mistake in buying the sweater but did not have the maturity to admit it to his parents. She tells Beaver they will give the sweater to someone who can use it. When Beaver asks his parents why they let him buy it if they knew it was wrong, Ward says that sometimes parents fear to hurt their children. Guests: Rusty Stevens as Larry Mondello, Jeri Weil as Judy Hensler.
71	32	"Friendship"	Norman Tokar	Story by : Mathilde & Theodore Ferro; Teleplay by : Joe Connelly & Bob Mosher	May 7, 1959	972A
Beaver is invited to Larry Mondello's for dinner. When Wally says, "It's about time!", June responds that they do not have to match invitations. At that, Wally says that they're always talking about owing an invitation. At Larry's, Beaver and Larry have a fight over the responsibilities of hosts and guests; and Ward has to pick up a soured Beaver early. Ward tells Beaver the Greek myth of Damon and Pythias to teach him the true meaning of friendship. Then Beaver and Larry let bygones be bygones and pledge eternal friendship like Damon and Pythias. Because he fell asleep early the previous evening and didn't do it, Larry takes advantage of the pledge by insisting Beaver give him his math homework. Beaver hesitates but gives Larry his homework. Beaver refuses to tell Miss Landers what happened to his homework and is punished and given a note to take home. Beaver says Larry is a "crummy Pythias". Ward says to give Larry a chance to put things right. The next day, Larry confesses to Miss Landers and the whole class and the boys become friends again. Guests: Sue Randall as Miss Landers, Rusty Stevens as Larry Mondello, Jeri Weil as Judy Hensler, Stanley Fafara as Whitey Whitney.
72	33	"Dance Contest"	Norman Tokar	Joe Connelly & Bob Mosher	May 14, 1959	973A
Mary Ellen formally invites Wally to a cotillion and overwhelms his initial reluctance. Wally's friends are impressed, because she's "the most". Mary enters the two of them in a cha-cha contest. Wally, not wanting to admit he cannot do the dance, buys an instructional record and clumsily practices in his room. Beaver and Larry find the record and, with much merriment, practice the dance. Wally is furious, breaks the record, and says he's not going to the dance. Beaver tells his parents that Wally doesn't want to go because he doesn't know the cha cha. Ward enrolls Wally in a quick cha-cha crash course with a dance instructor. Wally and Mary Ellen win honorary mention at the cotillion. Ward talks about the greater embarrassment of not admitting you cannot do things. Guests: Rusty Stevens as Larry Mondello, Pamela Baird (as Pamela Beaird) as Mary Ellen Rogers, "Tiger" Fafara as Tooey Brown, Buddy Hart as Chester Anderson, Frank Bank as Lumpy Rutherford. At one point, Beaver is watching Wally dance in their bedroom from outside the bedroom window. This is a well-known blooper of the series, as the bedroom is on the 2nd floor, and there is no way anyone could be standing outside this window, where there is no ledge.
73	34	"Wally's Haircomb"	Norman Tokar	Story by : George Tibbles; Teleplay by : Joe Connelly & Bob Mosher	May 21, 1959	965A
Eddie's new haircut inspires Wally to get the latest hairdo — a greasy cut called the "jellyroll". June hates it, thinking the "oil mop" makes Wally look, variously, like a tango dancer, gangster, or freak. Ward counsels patience, remembering the fads of his youth. The school principal says he cannot stifle a student's self-expression. When Lumpy adopts the "hair comb", Fred harrumphs at Ward's "do nothing" attitude. The last straw comes when Beaver styles his hair after Wally's. June reminds Wally how embarrassed he was when Beaver wore an old hat of hers to Sunday school and tells him she suffers the same sort of feeling when she sees him with his jellyroll hair-do. Wally understands and cleans his hair. Wally tells his parents they should feel free to tell him if he's doing something creepy. Guests: Frank Bank as Lumpy Rutherford, Richard Deacon as Fred Rutherford, Howard Wendell as Mr. Haller. The production of this episode is enhanced with "jazz" music every time the hairstyle is viewed on all the various boys.
74	35	"The Cookie Fund"	Norman Tokar	Joe Connelly & Bob Mosher	May 28, 1959	974A
Beaver and Larry are co-chairmen of the cookie committee, raising money for a class trip by selling cookies. They're conned out of three dollars by a bigger boy, Roger, from the eighth grade. Roger ingratiates himself by being helpful. Having seen their bank bag, Roger appears faint from hunger and tells the boys a tale of woe in order to get the money. But the next day he reneges on his promise to pay them back. Later, the cookie company representative gives the boys overnight to replace the money. Beaver asks his father for $1.50, his share. Ward tells Beaver he may have made the mistake of trusting someone, but he will not make the mistake of not trusting his son. The boys explain things to Miss Landers, asking that she relieve them of cookie fund duty. Miss Landers tells the boys that they'd done well otherwise, and she cannot think of anyone better, now that they'd learned their lesson. Guests: Danny Richards Jr. as Roger Delacy, Sue Randall as Miss Landers, Jeri Weil as Judy Hensler, John Eldredge as Mr. Preston, Rusty Stevens as Larry Mondello (uncredited).
75	36	"Forgotten Party"	Norman Tokar	Joe Connelly & Bob Mosher	June 4, 1959	975A
Beaver answers the phone, and David Manning, a friend he has not seen in two years, asks him to his birthday party. Beaver forgets his promise to attend his friend's party, goes out with Larry, and Mrs. Manning calls about his non-attendance. Ward and Wally search for Beaver, while June shops for a suitable gift. Wally brings Beaver, dirtied from a newly tarred road, home. Ward hustles to give Beaver a bath. June returns with a blow-up pool float Beaver calls a baby toy. When his parents leave Wally to deliver Beaver to the party, Beaver substitutes his new camera for the float. Later, Ward and June discover the deception but understand Beaver was only thinking of David. Beaver takes the float for his bath and asks Wally why David thought of him. Wally says absence makes people seem better. Beaver says he does not want to see David soon and spoil a good friendship. Guests: Rusty Stevens as Larry Mondello, Johnny Collier as David Manning, Mary Lawrence as Alice Manning, Bill Baldwin as Mr. Johnson.
76	37	"Beaver the Athlete"	Norman Tokar	Story by : George Tibbles; Teleplay by : Joe Connelly & Bob Mosher	June 11, 1959	976A
Beaver excitedly brings home a good report card. However, Ward is more concerned with the D in physical education, especially since Wally just lettered, and wonders at Beaver's non-competitive attitude. The next phys. ed. class is baseball practice, and Beaver performs so poorly he begins clowning around to mask his inadequacy. At first his friends laugh, but they become dismayed by his non-performance. Judy mocks Beaver with her own theatrics and hits a home run. Beaver begins worrying about the upcoming boys versus girls game. Later, Ward finds Beaver practicing his swing at the school baseball field. Beaver tells his father it's permissible to fool around for your friends but only if you can really perform when it counts. He scores well in the game. He credits Judy's performance earlier for inspiring his own effort. Guests: Rusty Stevens as Larry Mondello, Jeri Weil as Judy Hensler, Stanley Fafara as Whitey Whitney, Robert Carson as Coach Grover. Wally receives his first high school letter and sweater in this episode. His sweater would play a significant role in a future episode.
77	38	"Found Money"	Norman Tokar	Katherine & Dale Eunson	June 18, 1959	977A
After Beaver is refused an advance on his allowance, Larry offers to treat him to the carnival. Larry's mother also refuses to advance her son the money needed, so Larry filches his mother's emergency money and tosses it out the window. When Beaver comes over, Larry takes him in the yard and they "find" the money, Larry surmising that a pilot dropped it from a passing plane, and they go to the carnival, where Larry seems guilt-ridden. Mrs. Mondello telephones the Cleavers, tells them her money is missing and the boys are not about. When Beaver returns from the carnival his parents send him to his room until they can get to the bottom of things. Mrs. Mondello brings Larry to Ward, because his own father is out of town and it will take a man to get to the truth. The truth is discovered, but only when Larry defends Beaver, saying he knew nothing about the theft. Beaver is not punished but Larry is taken home to "pull weeds for the rest of his life". Guests: Rusty Stevens as Larry Mondello, "Tiger" Fafara as Tooey Brown, Madge Blake as Mrs. Mondello, Eddie Marr as Carnival Barker. The Cleavers talk about looking at houses in this episode.
78	39	"Most Interesting Character"	Norman Tokar	Joe Connelly, Bob Mosher, Mathilde & Theodore Ferro	June 25, 1959	978A
The Cleavers are still in the process of trying to sell their house. The boys are tired of having to keep their room tidy for prospective buyers. Meanwhile, Beaver's class is assigned the composition theme: "The Most Interesting Character I Have Ever Known". Beaver decides to write about his father for the assignment when Judy chooses to write about her father. At home, Ward is delighted that Beaver wants to write about him. But, after following his father about for the afternoon, Beaver decides Ward is boring. Wally tries to help Beaver make the composition more interesting. June suggests that Beaver write about what his father means to him rather than trying to list interesting things about him. Beaver writes a simple composition that moves Ward deeply. Guests: Sue Randall as Miss Landers, Rusty Stevens as Larry Mondello, Jeri Weil as Judy Hensler, Stanley Fafara as Whitey Whitney. In this episode, Ward tells the boys the Mapleton Drive house has been sold. The third season would open with the Cleavers in a new house at 211 Pine Street.
