= Static (The Twilight Zone) =

- The Twilight Zone episode
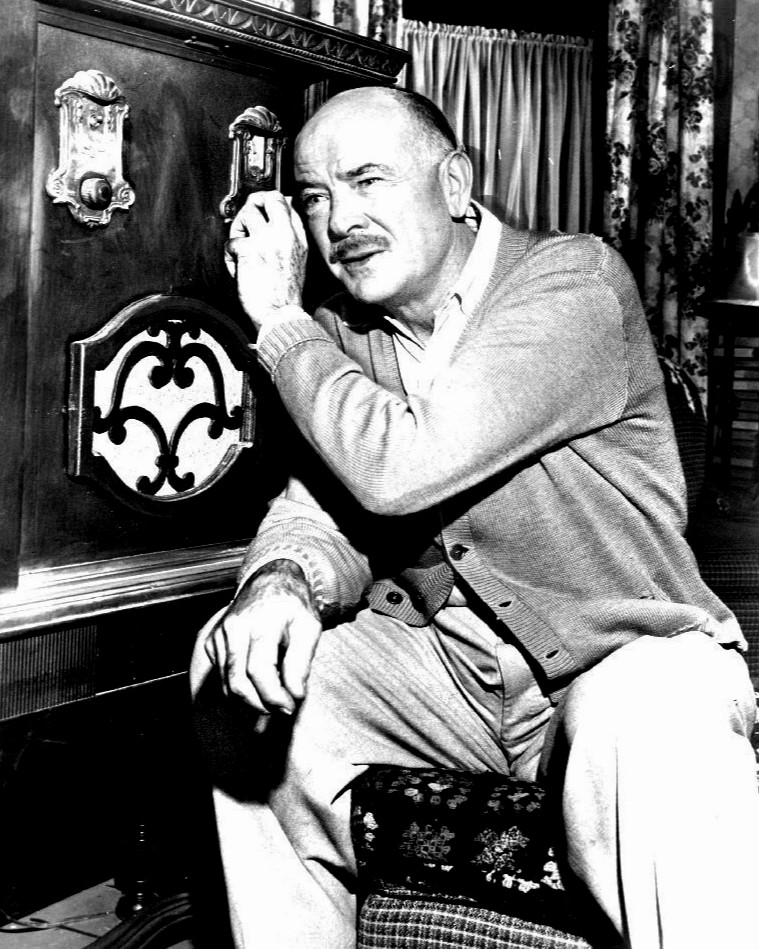
- Paranormal radio as seen in "Static", with Dean Jagger
- Episode no.: Season 2 Episode 20
- Directed by: Buzz Kulik
- Written by: Charles Beaumont
- Story by: Ocee Ritch
- Production code: 173-3663
- Original air date: March 10, 1961

Guest appearances
- Dean Jagger; Carmen Mathews; Robert Emhardt; Arch W. Johnson; Alice Pearce; Clegg Hoyt; Stephen Talbot

Episode chronology
| ← Previous "Mr. Dingle, the Strong" | Next → "The Prime Mover" |
- The Twilight Zone (1959 TV series) (season 2)

"Static" is episode 56 of the American television anthology series The Twilight Zone. It originally aired on March 10, 1961 on CBS. It was one of the six episodes of the second season which was shot on videotape in a short-lived experiment aimed to cut costs.

== Opening narration ==
No one ever saw one quite like that, because that's a very special sort of radio. In its day, circa 1935, its type was one of the most elegant consoles on the market. Now with its fabric-covered speakers, its peculiar yellow dial, its serrated knobs, it looks quaint and a little strange. Mr. Ed Lindsay is going to find out how strange very soon when he tunes in to the Twilight Zone.

== Plot ==
Ed Lindsay, an embittered bachelor in his late fifties, living in a boarding house, is dismayed over the mindless programs and commercials on the TV set watched by the residents. He retrieves from the basement an old radio which, in his younger and happier days, he enjoyed as a source of relaxation and entertainment. Installing it in his room, he is pleased to hear the radio receiving 1930s/1940s music and programs. He tells the others about the broadcasts, which they first assume are recordings. Unable to receive them on a modern portable radio, they come into his room—but hear only static. Ed tries to contact the radio station, but discovers it has been out of business for years.

Ed has a confrontation with Vinnie Broun, who has lived in the same boarding house with him for two decades. In an earlier era, they had intended to marry, but other things interfered until too much time had passed. She tells him that the past cannot be recovered and he should let it go, and that he is simply having a delusion. Ed is furious and he throws Vinnie out of his room. His obsession with his radio continues to grow.

Worried about Ed's mental state, Vinnie and the other residents have the radio hauled away by a shopkeeper. Ed rushes out and buys it back for $10. He takes it back to his room and, to his great relief, finds it still operational. He loses himself in an old Tommy Dorsey love song, the one he would share with Vinnie. He calls her to his room and the door swings open and Vinnie enters. Ed is suddenly transported back in time to 1940, and he and Vinnie are young again. Ecstatic, Ed professes his love for Vinnie and embraces her, determined to do things right this time around.

== Closing narration ==
Around and around she goes, and where she stops nobody knows. All Ed Lindsay knows is that he desperately wanted a second chance and finally got it, through a strange and wonderful time machine called a radio, in the Twilight Zone.

== Cast ==
- Dean Jagger as Ed Lindsay
- Carmen Mathews as Vinnie Broun
- Robert Emhardt as Professor Ackerman
- Arch W. Johnson as Roscoe Bragg
- Alice Pearce as Mrs. Nielson
- Clegg Hoyt as Shopkeeper
- Stephen Talbot as Boy
- Bob Crane as Disc Jockey (uncredited)

== Production ==
As The Twilight Zone's second season began, the production was informed by CBS that at about $65,000 per episode, the show was exceeding its budget. By November 1960, 16 episodes, more than half of the projected 29, were already filmed, and five of those had been broadcast. It was decided that six consecutive episodes (production code #173-3662 through #173-3667) would be videotaped at CBS Television City in the manner of a live drama and then transferred to 16-millimeter film for future syndicated TV transmissions. Eventual savings amounted to only about $30,000 for all six entries, which was judged to be insufficient to offset the loss of the depth of visual perspective that only film could offer. The shows wound up looking little better than set-bound soap operas and as a result the experiment was deemed a failure and never tried again.

A "modern day" adaptation of this story (set at the present time in England and with the 1930s radio switched out for a television of a type contemporary with the time of the original episode) was written as a short story of the same name by Robert Shearman. It was first published by Comma Press in Shearman’s 2007 anthology Tiny Deaths, and won a World Fantasy Award. The story itself was then adapted into a short film, which took the action back to the United States, but kept the present day setting. The themes of loss and longing for a simpler romanticised past are prevalent in all three versions.

== See also ==
- List of The Twilight Zone (1959 TV series) episodes
