= Mimi Chakarova =

American documentary filmmaker

Mimi Chakarova (Bulgarian: Мими Чакърова) is a Bulgarian-American photographer and filmmaker. Chakarova grew up in Communist-era Bulgaria. Her best known work is likely The Price of Sex, a 2011 documentary about sex trafficking. Her other film work includes The Hour (2005) and Frontline/World (2002). Most recent is Men: A Love Story (2016).

She is the recipient of the Dorothea Lange Fellowship for outstanding work in documentary photography. Chakarova's work has been recognized by being awarded the Nestor Almendros Award for courage in filmmaking, the Daniel Pearl Award for Outstanding International Investigative Reporting, the Magnum Photos Inge Morath Award (for her work on sex trafficking), and a People's Voice Webby as well as a nomination for a News & Documentary Emmy Award.

She taught photography at UC Berkeley's Graduate School of Journalism and at Stanford University’s African and African American Studies and Comparative Studies for Race and Ethnicity.
