= The Price of Sex =

- Film poster
- Directed by: Mimi Chakarova
- Produced by: Mimi Chakarova
- Cinematography: Adam Keker
- Music by: Christopher Hedge
- Release date: April 9, 2011 (Sarasota)
- Running time: 73 minutes
- Country: United States
- Language: English

The Price of Sex is a 2011 full-length documentary film directed and produced by Mimi Chakarova. The film was released in multiple countries including Turkey, United States, United Arab Emirates, Bulgaria.

== Synopsis ==
The documentary is set in the post-Communist Eastern Europe. It is first hand information gathered about the Eastern European women who are sold or forcefully sent to neighbouring countries and areas for sex trafficking. The story is told by the survivors or victims. They have narrated their misery, harassment, distressful experiences and intimidation without any reservations for appearing in the film.

== Cast ==
- Mimi Chakarova (voice).

== Production ==
The film was directed, written and produced by Mimi Chakarova, photojournalist by profession. To shoot the film Chakarova traveled to rural areas to personally meet the victims. She also had to pose as a prostitute to gather material and build confidence of the sex workers, who had escaped from their ordeal, to narrate their individual experience of how they were exploited either by neighbourhood boys or pimps by promising jobs, who sold them to brothel keepers in the countries of eastern and western Europe and the Middle East.

Stephen Talbot was the executive producer of the film. Christopher Hedge composed the music for the film. Editing of the film was done by Stephanie Mechura Challberg and Adam Keker was the director of photography. The run time of the documentary is 73 minutes and is subtitled in Russian, Turkish and Bulgarian languages.

== Awards ==
The film received the 2011 Nestor Almendros Award at the Human Rights at the Human Rights Watch Film Festival. Other awards received for the film are the 2011 Daniel Pearl Award (to the director) and the 2012 American Library Association Notable Videos for Adults List.
