= Marco Werman =

American radio personality

- Education: Duke University (BA)
- Occupation: Radio personality
- Spouse: Schuyler Engel
- Parent(s): Marjolijn deJager Werman; David S. Werman

Marco Werman is an American radio personality. He is a host, reporter and senior producer in public radio. Werman is the host of Public Radio Exchange's The World. He took over as full-time host of the program on January 1, 2013 after years as fill-in host and producer of the Global Hit music segment. His journalism experience includes documentary photography, print, radio and television.

== Biography ==
Werman is the son of Marjolijn (née deJager) and David S. Werman. His mother was of Dutch descent and his father was Jewish. His mother converted to Judaism and he states he was raised in Jewish culture but not religious. Werman has been working in journalism since he was 16 when he worked as a copy boy at the News and Observer in Raleigh, North Carolina. He graduated from Duke University in 1983. After graduation, he joined the Peace Corps where he served in Togo and Burkina Faso for three years. While in Burkina Faso, he started freelancing for the BBC World Service and later moved to London where he produced the BBC program, Network Africa. "Radio impressed me in Africa," says Werman. "Everyone had one, broadcasts happened in many languages, and in the two coups I witnessed, the radio station was important booty: it and the electrical generator were always the first targets."

In 1990, he moved back to the United States and started a new public radio station, WCFE-FM, in Plattsburgh, New York, where he hosted a daily two-hour news and public affairs show for four years. In 1994, he moved to Rome, Italy where he was the correspondent for Monitor Radio. In 1995, he was invited to assist in creating the format for The World, where he has worked since. In 1997, he began producing the Global Hit segment, in which musicians and global musical trends are linked and used as a lens to understand the news. This segment has also become a popular podcast as part of the PRI News podcasts.

Werman has been the recipient of awards from the National Federation of Community Broadcasters for an original radio drama that he wrote; the Sony Awards for an exposé on child labor in West African gold mines; from the New York Festivals for a BBC documentary on the 1987 assassination of Burkina Faso's president; and the first annual Unity award from the Radio-Television News Directors Association for coverage of diversity issues.

In 2006, Werman travelled to Libya, soon after Muammar al-Gaddafi renounced weapons of mass destruction, to film a documentary about the total solar eclipse that brought thousands of tourists to Libya. In 2007, he won an Emmy for his story "Libya: Out of the Shadow" on the PBS program Frontline/World.

Werman is also the host and a reporter for a music series for PBS called "Sound Tracks: Music Without Borders," which he co-created with PBS producer Stephen Talbot. The pilot aired in 2010. A new episode was broadcast on PBS in October 2012. He is also a presenter and interviewer for the PBS Arts online series, "Sound Tracks presents Quick Hits" where he has interviewed Jovanotti, Seu Jorge, Charles Bradley, Milos Karadaglic and Levon Helm.

Werman also was a host of BBC World Service "Boston Calling", which explored how the world looks through American eyes, and the myriad and unexpected ways that the world influences the United States. The last episode aired on 27 June 2020.

== Personal life ==
Werman is married to Schuyler Engel. He is a lifelong surfer.
