= Leave It to Beaver season 1 =

Leave It to Beaver
- Season 1
- No. of episodes: 39

Release
- Original network: CBS
- Original release: October 4, 1957 – July 16, 1958

Season chronology
- Next → Season 2

The first season of the American television situation comedy Leave It to Beaver premiered on October 4, 1957, and concluded on July 16, 1958 (the show switched from Fridays to Wednesdays midway through the season). It consisted of 39 episodes shot in black-and-white, each running approximately 25 minutes in length. This was the only season that the show originally aired on CBS.

== Episodes ==
No. overall	No. in season	Title	Directed by	Written by	Original release date	Prod. code
1	1	"Beaver Gets 'Spelled"	Norman Tokar	Joe Connelly & Bob Mosher	October 4, 1957	903A
Miss Canfield wants Beaver to play Smokey Bear in a school pageant and gives him a note to take home requesting parental permission. Beaver believes he's going to be expelled. With Wally's help, he concocts a letter from "Mrs. Ward Cleaver" assuring his teacher he's been punished for his offense. His teacher is mystified and calls June to school. The confusion is resolved. Beaver, however, has climbed a tree to escape punishment and, after much ado, is coaxed to descend. Guests: Burt Mustin as Gus the Fireman, Doris Packer as Mrs. Cornelia Rayburn, Diane Brewster as Miss Canfield, Ralph Sanford as Fats Flannaghan, Stanley Fafara as Whitey Whitney, Jeri Weil as Judy Hensler, Gary Allen as First Man in Park, Alan Reynolds as Second Man in Park, Steve Paylow as Boy in Park. "Beaver Gets 'Spelled" was third in production order but became the premiere episode when "Captain Jack", the first episode in production order and intended premiere, was delayed while being reviewed by the censors. First appearances for Burt Mustin as Gus, Doris Packer as Mrs. Rayburn, Diane Brewster as Miss Canfield, Stanley Fafara as Whitey Whitney, and Jeri Weil as Judy Hensler. Whitey is called 'Harold' in this episode. In later seasons, Whitey would be called 'Hubert'.
2	2	"Captain Jack"	Norman Tokar	Joe Connelly & Bob Mosher	October 11, 1957	901A
Wally and Beaver order a baby alligator through the mail and hide him in their toilet tank. They treat friends to viewings in their bedroom. When the alligator grows too large for the toilet tank, they move him to a laundry tub in the basement. Minerva, the housekeeper, finds the reptile. Ward thinks that Minerva may have gotten into his Brandy and is seeing things. Ward congratulates the boys for taking good care of the alligator but decides he must be sent to a local alligator park. Ward surprises the boys with a terrier. Guests: Irving Bacon as Postal Clerk, Edgar Buchanan as Captain Jack, Connie Gilchrist as Minerva, Penny Carpenter as Neighborhood Girl. "Captain Jack" was the first in production order and the intended premiere but was held up in the censors' office regarding scenes displaying a toilet. The show was forced to debut with "Beaver Gets 'Spelled". "Captain Jack" was televised the week following the premiere. The episode has taken its place in television history as the first to display a toilet. The terrier never returns to the show after this episode; nor does housekeeper Minerva. In a later episode, Ward reminds Beaver the dog was given away when he neglected to care for him. It's difficult to believe that a show about a middle class household with two boys wouldn't have a dog, but, in real life, dogs and other animals in films and television can be difficult, time-consuming, and expensive to work with — which accounts for the fact that very few sitcoms feature family pets with regularity. The alligator and the terrier are Beaver's first of several "one-shot" pets over the course of the series. In 1997, TV Guide ranked this episode #42 on its list of the 100 Greatest Episodes.
3	3	"The Black Eye"	Norman Tokar	Story by : Rik Vollaerts; Teleplay by : Joe Connelly & Bob Mosher	October 18, 1957	902A
Beaver gets a black eye from Violet Rutherford. Ward, thinking Beaver was beat up by a boy, decides his son should learn to defend himself and begins boxing lessons in the garage. Beaver is knocked to the floor by a punching bag. Nonetheless, he heads to Violet's house, but Violet doesn't want to fight and the two instead have a day of fun together. After Wally reveals to his dad that it was a co-worker's daughter that Beaver fought with, Ward and Fred Rutherford, Violet's father, set off in search of them to stop a rematch. They find the two sitting on the steps quietly chewing gum. Fred gets irritated with Ward because they looked all over town for nothing. Ward backs down from the fight. Later, Beaver asks Ward why a parent could back down from a fight but a kid shouldn't. Guests: Wendy Winkelman as Violet Rutherford, Richard Deacon as Fred Rutherford, Burt Mustin as Gus the Fireman, Jeri Weil as Judy Hensler, Julie Bennett as Waitress, Philip Greisman as First Neighborhood Boy, Lonnie Thomas as Second Neighborhood Boy, Tommy Berwald as Third Neighborhood Boy, Richard Smiley as Fourth Neighborhood Boy. First appearance for Richard Deacon as Fred Rutherford. Deacon remained in the series for its entire run. Violet Rutherford would be played in later episodes by Veronica Cartwright.
4	4	"The Haircut"	Norman Tokar	Bill Manhoff	October 25, 1957	908A
Beaver has been losing money left and right, to Ward's chagrin. Ward gives Beaver money for a haircut, but Beaver loses it as well, and is afraid to explain yet another loss to his parents. With Wally's help, Beaver gives himself a ragged haircut, and the two try to cover it up by wearing stocking caps to dinner, saying the caps are part of a secret club initiation. Ward and June are skeptical of this claim, and later they lift Beaver's cap while he sleeps and discover the truth, much to June's horror. The next day, Ward orders the two boys to come clean about everything. Angered by their deception, he plans on punishing the boys, but June tells him that Beaver was afraid to come to them after losing his money, so they have no one but themselves to blame. Ward decides not to punish the boys, but makes them promise not to be afraid to come to them when they have a problem. Guests: Benny Baker as Barber, Gilbert Frye as Mr. Tyne. This is the only episode related to a holiday (Christmas) in the entire series. In one scene, June sews Beaver's angel costume and, in the finale, Beaver sings a Christmas carol in a choir of angels at a school concert.
5	5	"New Neighbors"	Norman Tokar	Joe Connelly & Bob Mosher	November 1, 1957	907A
The Donaldsons move in next door and Beaver carries a bouquet to Mrs. Donaldson. She gives him a kiss. Eddie and Wally give Beaver the business over the kiss and warn him of jealous husbands. Mrs. Donaldson invites Beaver to her niece's birthday party. While there, Beaver hears Mr. Donaldson coming home. Being afraid of him, Beaver runs home and hides under his bed. When explanations are offered, Mr. Donaldson tells Beaver he can kiss his wife whenever he likes. Guests: Charles H. Gray as Harry Donaldson, Phyllis Coates (Lois Lane in the 1950s Superman TV series) as Betty Donaldson, Yolanda White as Julia, Ken Osmond as Eddie Haskell. Ken Osmond's first appearance as Eddie Haskell.
6	6	"Brotherly Love"	Norman Tokar	Story by : Norman Tokar; Teleplay by : Joe Connelly & Bob Mosher	November 8, 1957	909A
After a fight, June makes the boys create a friendship pact, promising to have fun together. Both boys get separate invitations from friends and try to get the other to break the pact first without revealing his invitation. When they accuse each other of being "sneaks", another fight explodes. Ward settles things by telling the boys that the good times they have together will far outweigh the bad times. Guests: Burt Mustin as Gus the Fireman, Buddy Hart as Chester Anderson, Herb Vigran as Stanley the Barber. Buddy Hart's first appearance as Chester Anderson.
7	7	"Water, Anyone?"	Norman Tokar	Clifford Goldsmith	November 15, 1957	904A
Beaver is left out when Ward and the other neighborhood dads offer to pay Wally and his friends for doing outdoor chores to help them buy baseball uniforms. When workmen turn the water off for the afternoon, Beaver gets rich selling water to Wally and his friends. The boys are angry, saying Beaver has swindled them out of their money. When the electric power is shut off, Beaver gives his earnings to the boys to buy candles which they then sell at exorbitant prices in the neighborhood. With enough money earned from candle-selling, the boys buy baseball uniforms and welcome Beaver to the team. Guests: "Tiger" Fafara as Tooey Brown, Katherine Warren as Mrs. Brown, Francis DeSales as Mr. Anderson, Buddy Hart as Chester Anderson, Eddie Marr as First Water Worker, Norm Alden as Second Water Worker. "Tiger" Fafara's first appearance as Tooey Brown. His brother Stanley Fafara appears as Whitey Whitney in the series.
8	8	"Beaver's Crush"	Norman Tokar	Story by : Phil Leslie; Teleplay by : Joe Connelly & Bob Mosher	November 22, 1957	913A
Beaver has a crush on Miss Canfield and his classmates tease him. To prove he's not the teacher's pet, he takes them up on a dare and puts a spring-action snake in her desk drawer. But, after he's done it, he wishes he hadn't. That night, Wally and Beaver sneak into the school but, night watchman Mr. Johnson's dog, scares them away. The next day, Miss Canfield tells him she found the snake early in the morning. She blames herself for the prank saying she shouldn't favor one student over another. She assures him he'll find a nice girl his own age. Guests: Diane Brewster as Miss Canfield, Doris Packer as Mrs. Rayburn, William Fawcett as Mr. Johnson, Jeri Weil as Judy Hensler, Stanley Fafara as Whitey Whitney, Rusty Stevens as Larry Mondello. First appearance for Rusty Stevens as Larry Mondello, although Larry Mondello has been mentioned in previous episodes and Rusty Stevens has been seen in school crowd scenes.
9	9	"The Clubhouse"	Norman Tokar	Story by: Lydia Nathan; Teleplay by: Joe Connelly & Bob Mosher	November 29, 1957	911A
It's a rainy weekend day, and all in the Cleaver household are stuck inside figuring how to spend their time. Wally, Eddie, and Tooey plan to build a clubhouse, charging eighth graders one dollar to join and second graders (Beaver) three dollars. Beaver makes a sandwich board, renting his front for 50 cents and his back for 75 cents. He also charges passers-by 10 cents to spit off a nearby bridge. He makes two dollars but gives it to Pete the Hobo in the park, who gives Beaver a sob story. Back home, Wally and his friends have forgotten all about a clubhouse. Guests: James Gleason as Pete, Allen Windsor as Ice Cream Man, Johnny Silver as Man on Bridge, Raymond Hatton as Charlie the Fireman, Charles Wagenheim as Bridge Painter, Ken Osmond as Eddie Haskell, "Tiger" Fafara as Tooey Brown.
10	10	"Wally's Girl Trouble"	Norman Tokar	Ben Gershman & Mel Diamond	December 6, 1957	905A
Wally meets pretty Penny Jamison at dance class and thereafter has little time for his brother. Beaver mows the lawn for Wally, hoping to win his companionship back. When Penny calls and asks Wally over to her house, he tells her he can't because he has a commitment to take the Beaver fishing. Penny reacts violently, telling Wally she won't have anything to do with someone who has to watch over a "grubby little infant". Beaver wants to find a way to help Wally with Penny. Ward tells Beaver one way to win a woman's favor after a fight is to give her a sentimental gift. Beaver gives Penny his pet frog, Herbie, which ends her relationship with both boys. Guests: Carol Sydes as Penny Jamison, Erik Nielsen as First Boy in Library, Paul Engle as Second Boy in Library, Stephen Hammer as Third Boy in Library, Louise Lewis as Store Clerk, Barbara Dodd as Librarian, Rusty Stevens as Larry Mondello.
11	11	"Beaver's Short Pants"	Norman Tokar	Joe Connelly & Bob Mosher	December 13, 1957	912A
Aunt Martha arrives to tend house when June goes out of town. She buys Beaver an outdated outfit, consisting of an Eton jacket, short pants with suspenders, knee-length socks, a bow tie, and a cap, and she expects him to wear it to school. He reluctantly does, and his classmates ridicule him, provoking a fight. Wally later informs Ward about the fight, brought on by the kids teasing Beaver about his outfit. Ward starts to tell Aunt Martha, but decides against it, knowing June wouldn't want any of them to hurt her feelings. The next morning, Beaver is once again dutifully wearing his outfit but Ward ambushes him at the garage and sneaks him into some regular clothes, promising to do the same thing for the remainder of Aunt Martha's visit. When Aunt Martha leaves for home, Beaver wears the suit, thinking the gesture will please her. Guests: Madge Kennedy as Aunt Martha, Eric Snowden as Clothier, William Schallert as Mr. Bloomgarten, Jeri Weil as Judy Hensler, Rusty Stevens as Larry Mondello.
12	12	"The Perfume Salesmen"	Norman Tokar	Mel Diamond & Ben Gershman	December 27, 1957	910A
Wally and Beaver send for a supply of "Flower of the Orient" perfume to sell door-to-door, planning to make enough money to win a movie projector. But selling the perfume turns out to be harder than they think, especially when everyone agrees that it smells like an old catcher's mitt. Ward then secretly calls members of June's Women's Club and offers to reimburse the ladies if they will buy the perfume from the boys. The boys sell all the perfume. When the movie projector arrives, Ward is disappointed to find it's a cheap plastic toy. He quietly buys the boys a real projector and the boys are thrilled. After a while the boys figure out what Ward did, but decide not to say anything and ruin his nice gesture. Guests: Anne Dore as Mrs. Wentworth, Helen Jay as Customer.
13	13	"Voodoo Magic"	Norman Tokar	Bill Manhoff	January 3, 1958	914A
Eddie talks the Cleaver boys into seeing a scary movie, even though they promised their parents they wouldn't. Beaver blames Eddie for getting him into trouble with his parents so he makes a voodoo doll and sticks a nail in it. Later, Beaver learns Eddie is sick and tells him about the curse but Eddie laughs, telling Beaver he's just feigning sickness to avoid school. When Beaver leaves, Eddie suddenly has stomach pains. Mr. Haskell storms the Cleaver house and insists that Beaver remove the curse. Ward sends Beaver to the Haskell house with a genuine voodoo curse remover that includes three hairs plucked from a small boy's head. Guests: Karl Swenson as George Haskell, Ann Doran as Agnes Haskell, Doris Packer as Mrs. Rayburn, Ken Osmond as Eddie Haskell.
14	14	"Part Time Genius"	Norman Tokar	Story by : Hendrik "Rik" Vollaerts; Teleplay by : Joe Connelly & Bob Mosher	January 10, 1958	906A
After Beaver takes an intelligence test at school, Miss Canfield informs Ward and June that he received the highest grade of all. Having to listen to colleague "Corny" Cornelius brag about his children's academic excellence, Ward is thrilled to be able to return the favor. Mrs. Rayburn arranges an interview at a school for geniuses. At home, Miss Canfield arrives with Beaver's new classmate, Charles Fredericks. Charles switched Beaver's test paper with his own because he always scores high on tests and his classmates shun him. Ward and June are glad Beaver is just Beaver. Guests: Diane Brewster as Miss Canfield, Doris Packer as Mrs. Rayburn, Bobby Mittelstaedt as Charles Fredericks, John Hoyt as Dr. Compton, Charles Davis as Willis "Corny" Cornelius, Jeri Weil as Judy Hensler, Stanley Fafara as Whitey Whitney, Rusty Stevens as Larry Mondello.
15	15	"Party Invitation"	Norman Tokar	Mel Diamond & Ben Gershman	January 17, 1958	916A
Linda Dennison is sweet on Beaver and invites him to her all-girl birthday party, which he then tries to avoid. Wally tries to tell Mrs. Dennison that Beaver is ill, but he is caught in the act by Ward. Ward takes Beaver to Linda's house and makes him go inside. When the girls want to play a kissing game called "post office", Beaver scoots off to another part of the house where Mr. Dennison entertains him with the antique gun collection in his den. That night, after Ward had learned why Beaver had been so reluctant to attend the party, he apologizes to Beaver. Beaver writes a note to Linda asking permission to walk her home after school. He tells Wally he really wants to see the gun collection again. Guests: Lyle Talbot as Chuck Dennison, Claudia Bryar as Mrs. Dennison, Patty Turner as Linda Dennison, Jeri Weil as Judy Hensler, Rusty Stevens as Larry Mondello, Stanley Fafara as Whitey Whitney, Dorothy Anne Collier as First Girl at Party, Betty Budzak as Second Girl at Party.
16	16	"Lumpy Rutherford"	Norman Tokar	Joe Connelly & Bob Mosher	January 24, 1958	917A
Lumpy Rutherford bullies the boys after school. When Ward tells his sons about booby-trapping a bully when he was a boy, he thinks of it as no more than an amusing anecdote. The boys try the same booby-trapping method, but Fred Rutherford becomes its victim rather than Lumpy. When the Rutherfords arrive at the Cleaver house to play cards, Fred mentions the incident. Wally and Beaver, not knowing if Mr. Rutherford saw that it was they who pulled the prank, do whatever they can to avoid Mr. Rutherford while he's in their house. Ward suspects his sons. They confess. Ward tells Fred and Fred says he will speak to his son about the bullying. Guests: Richard Deacon as Fred Rutherford, Frank Bank as Clarence "Lumpy" Rutherford, Helen Parrish as Geraldine Rutherford. In future episodes, "Geraldine" would become "Gwendolyn". This is the last time in the series that Hugh Beaumont's voice-over sets up the story at the beginning of the episode.
17	17	"The Paper Route"	Norman Tokar	Fran van Hartesveldt, Joe Connelly & Bob Mosher	January 31, 1958	915A
Ward refuses to give Wally and Beaver the close to $50 they need to buy a new bike, telling them a story about how people work for their money. The boys get a paper route to earn the money for the bike. Their boss is Mr. Merkel – whom they call Old Man Merkel – a taskmaster who will not hesitate to fire them if they goof up. Ward and June help out with the workload. One afternoon, June discovers a pile of papers in the garage, and, not realizing they're last week's papers, folds and delivers them around the neighborhood with Ward's help. Customers complain to the newspaper office. The boys are fired. Ward gets them reinstated but the boys have found jobs as grocery bag-boys. When the new bike arrives, the boys let Ward have the first ride. Guests: Jackie Kelk as Mr. Merkel, Alan Reynolds as Newspaper Delivery Man, Gilbert Frye as Newspaper Customer, Yvonne White as First Newspaper Customer, Lyn Osborn as Second Newspaper Customer.
18	18	"Child Care"	Norman Tokar	Joe Connelly & Bob Mosher	February 7, 1958	918A
Wally and Beaver are planning on hanging out at the fire-hall with their friend, Old Pete, to polish the fire truck. The boys' plans are changed when Herb and Janet Wilson, friends who are driving Ward and June to a wedding, bring along their daughter Puddin', since their babysitter canceled on them at the last minute. Wally and Beaver are now stuck babysitting Puddin'. Puddin' locks herself in the bathroom and won't come out. Beaver passes Benjie Bellamy through the bathroom window but Benjie is unable to open the door. The boys call Fireman Pete to rescue the children. Later, neighbors tell the Cleavers that firemen were at the house, but Ward and June decide to wait until the boys are ready to speak. Guests: Shirley Mitchell as Janet Wilson, Ray Montgomery as Herb Wilson, Will Wright as Pete the Fireman, Gabrielle des Enfants (as Gabrielle) as Helen "Puddin'" Wilson, Joey Scott as Benjie Bellamy.
19	19	"The Bank Account"	Norman Tokar	Phil Leslie	February 14, 1958	919A
Wally and Beaver have saved some money. Ward suggests they deposit it in their school savings account, rather than spend it carelessly. He mentions that just because he'd like a new hunting jacket for himself, he won't squander money on it. During lunch time at school, the boys go to an expensive sporting goods store to look at hunting jackets. They find a really decent one, but it costs more than they currently have. The two boys opt to withdraw from their school savings accounts to cover the remainder of the cost and leave school early. Mrs. Rayburn informs Ward of the withdrawal; and Ward is furious, believing the boys are skipping school to buy themselves fancy baseball equipment, which is seemingly confirmed when the package arrives from the sporting goods store. Ward calls everyone around to decide if the boys' purchase was a worthwhile one, but is rendered speechless to find the boys have bought him a fine new hunting jacket. So much so that he wears it the rest of the evening. Guests: Eric Snowden as Salesman, Doris Packer as Mrs. Rayburn.
20	20	"Lonesome Beaver"	Norman Tokar	Joe Connelly & Bob Mosher	February 28, 1958	920A
Beaver has always enjoyed hanging out with Wally and Wally's big-kid friends, and in turn Wally has always enjoyed having Beaver around. But, when Wally joins the scouts, Beaver is left home alone. Beaver does not yet meet the minimum 11-year-old age requirement to join. Ward finds Beaver wandering idly about the neighborhood and tells him that Wally can't keep him company forever. At home the two discover Wally's trip was rained out and Wally is home. Beaver is glad to have Wally at home. Later, when Wally attends a scout meeting, Beaver goes to bed early, using Wally's official scout sleeping bag in preparation for the day when he'll be a scout. Guests: Burt Mustin as Gus the Fireman, Ken Osmond as Eddie Haskell, Buddy Hart as Chester Anderson, Tiger Fafara as Tooey Brown, Lillian O'Malley as Mrs. Whitney, John Hart as Troop #21 Scoutmaster Norton.
21	21	"Cleaning Up Beaver"	Norman Tokar	Bill Manhoff	March 7, 1958	922A
Ward and June praise Wally for his neat appearance. Beaver is told he should follow his brother's example. Following a suggestion from Larry, Beaver moves into the guest room where he can be his untidy self without criticism. That night, shadows in the room and scary noises spook Beaver and force him back to the safety of his old room. The brothers strike a middle ground: Wally will be a little less neat and Beaver will be a little less untidy. Guests: Ken Osmond as Eddie Haskell, Rusty Stevens as Larry Mondello.
22	22	"The Perfect Father"	Norman Tokar	Story by : Fran Van Hartesveldt; Teleplay by : Joe Connelly & Bob Mosher	March 14, 1958	921A
Ward is jealous when the boys want to play at the Dennison house all the time, so he installs a basketball hoop on the garage. The boys and their friends play basketball until Ward joins them, delivering criticisms and comments on how to play like a pro. The boys leave. At the country club, Mr. Dennison tells Ward he used to join in when his older sons played, but it drove them away, so nowadays, he lets the boys just play and have fun without intervening. Later, Ward tells June the secret of being close to your children is to stay away from them. Guests: Lyle Talbot as Charles "Chuck" Dennison, Richard Smiley as Willie Dennison, Ken Osmond as Eddie Haskell, Tiger Fafara as Tooey, Buddy Hart as Chester Anderson. This episode has visual bloopers in the background when Ward is outside showing the boys how to shoot baskets, including palm trees (never to be found in Mayfield, located in the vicinity of Ohio), a tall office building (off set, poorly hidden behind a tree), and the curved top of a studio building (on set), located over the roof of their house.
23	23	"Beaver and Poncho"	Norman Tokar	Joe Connelly & Bob Mosher	March 21, 1958	924A
Beaver brings home a lost chihuahua and the Cleavers put an ad in the newspaper. Mrs. Bennett calls to claim her "Poncho". The next day, Beaver carries the dog to school in his coat. Mrs. Bennett arrives at the Cleaver house, and grows distressed when Poncho cannot be found. Beaver returns from school and tells Mrs. Bennett he only took Poncho to school because he wanted the dog to remember him a little longer. Guests: Maudie Prickett as Mrs. Bennett, Diane Brewster as Miss Canfield, Doris Packer as Mrs. Rayburn, Patty Turner as Linda Dennison, Joanna Lee as Newspaper Clerk, Stanley Fafara as Whitey Whitney, Rusty Stevens as Larry Mondello, Jeri Weil as Judy Hensler.
24	24	"The State vs. Beaver"	Norman Tokar	Joe Connelly & Bob Mosher	March 26, 1958	923A
Although June thinks the boys are too young, Ward helps the boys build a kart with a one-cylinder lawnmower motor. Egged on by Larry, Beaver rides the kart in the street against his father's orders. Beaver receives a ticket for driving without a license. Wally acts as Beaver's "guardian" in court so Beaver won't have to tell his father about the incident. Beaver gets worried when the tough traffic court judge begins sentencing people to jail. He cries and the judge sends the boys home, saying they've been punished enough. Guests: Frank Wilcox as Judge, William Kendis as Police Officer, Rusty Stevens as Larry Mondello.
25	25	"The Broken Window"	James Neilson	Joe Connelly & Bob Mosher	April 2, 1958	925A
After Eddie accidentally hits a baseball through the Cleavers' window, Ward forbids anyone from playing ball near the house. The next day while Ward and June are out, the boys crack a window in the car door with their baseball. Not wanting to get into trouble, especially after what their parents told them not to do, Wally and Beaver decide to get the window repaired before their parents get home, which will require them to raise $16. When they can't get that much money so soon, they roll the window down, hoping the damage won't be noticed immediately. The next day, when Ward takes the family on an outing, he asks Beaver to roll up the window. Before rolling the window up, the boys confess to breaking it. Beaver rolls the window up and finds the damage repaired. Ward says he slammed the car door the night before and heard glass shattering. Believing he broke the window, he had it repaired. Ward is glad they told the truth. Guests: Buddy Hart as Chester Anderson, Tiger Fafara as Tooey Brown, Ken Osmond as Eddie Haskell, Rusty Stevens as Larry Mondello, Charles Davis as Willis "Corny" Cornelius, Ralph Sanford as Fats Flannaghan, Bill Hunt as Grocer.
26	26	"Train Trip"	Norman Tokar	Joe Connelly & Bob Mosher	April 9, 1958	926A
Returning home from a visit to Aunt Martha, the boys spend their train ticket money on treats. They board the train with cheaper tickets for Bellport, rather than Mayfield. They tell the conductor a fantastic tale about their father falling from an airplane, hoping the conductor will to allow them to ride the extra distance to Mayfield. The conductor says he will cover the cost for the rest of the trip. He gives the boys his address so they can mail the extra cost to him later. That evening, Mr. Haskell tells Ward he was on the train and heard the boys' fantastic tale. As Ward tucks the boys in, he quietly asks the boys about the money, and slyly tells them he is fully recovered from his fall. June overhears Ward, and asks what's going on. Ward starts to tell her the whole thing. Guests: Ricky Allen as Boy in Train Station, Joe Crehan as Train Conductor, Mary Foran as Lady in Bus Station, Madge Kennedy as Aunt Martha, Eddie Marr as Ticket Salesman, Alan Reynolds as man in Train Station, Karl Swenson as George Haskell, Bess Flowers as Lady in Train Station Waiting Room (uncredited).
27	27	"My Brother's Girl"	Norman Tokar	Story by : Bill Manhoff; Teleplay by : Joe Connelly & Bob Mosher	April 16, 1958	927A
Wally decides to go to a dance without a date but Mary Ellen Rogers has different plans for him. Mary Ellen starts to befriend Beaver at school. She tells Beaver he can come to her house to see her father's train set if he brings Wally with him. The boys go to Mary Ellen's house where she entertains them with ginger ale and donuts. She keeps sending Beaver to the kitchen so she can manipulate Wally into going to the dance with her. Beaver realizes he was used to get to Wally and leaves. Ward tries to explain to Beaver that some women can be very manipulative. Guests: Buddy Hart as Chester Anderson, Ken Osmond as Eddie Haskell, Jan Gillum as Kathleen, Linda Lowell as Frances, Pamela Baird (Pamela Beard) as Mary Ellen Rogers, Raymond Karr as Boy.
28	28	"Next Door Indians"	Norman Tokar	Joe Connelly & Bob Mosher; Suggested by a Story by: Robert Paul Smith	April 23, 1958	928A
Beaver wants the bigger boys to notice him so he tells a fib about a real, live Indian fight that occurred across the street from the Cleaver house a hundred years ago. Beaver even bets Eddie Haskell a dollar fifty that it really happened. The bigger boys dig for artifacts in the field and find garnets. They dream of becoming "jillionaires". Beaver's balloon is burst when he learns the garnets are not precious jewels but the worthless kind used for making sandpaper. Ward points out to Beaver the risks of making up stories and trying to be a "make-believe big guy". Guests: Burt Mustin as Gus the Fireman, Ken Osmond as Eddie Haskell, Buddy Hart as Chester Anderson, Tiger Fafara as Tooey Brown. This is the only episode in which a vacant lot appears across the street from the Cleavers. Usually it's friends and neighbors of Beaver and Wally across the street, such as Chuckie and Gilbert.
29	29	"Tenting Tonight"	Norman Tokar	Story by : Fred Shevin; Teleplay by : Joe Connelly & Bob Mosher	April 30, 1958	930A
Dismayed by the amount of time the boys spend at the movies, Ward plans a camping trip. But, Eddie Haskell's dire prediction that Ward never really intended to go camping seems to come true after unexpected office work forces Ward to cancel the trip. So, the boys camp out in the backyard on their own. It rains heavily and June is worried about the boys but Ward assures her they can take care of themselves. The next morning, June finds water spots in the house. Ward tells her the boys made the spots when they left their tent in the storm and carried their sleeping bags up to their bedroom. He had left the back door unlocked for the two. Guests: Ken Osmond as Eddie Haskell, Buddy Hart as Chester Anderson, Tiger Fafara as Tooey Brown, Frank Bank as Lumpy Rutherford, Richard Deacon as Fred Rutherford.
30	30	"Music Lesson"	Norman Tokar	Story by : Jack Patrick; Teleplay by : Joe Connelly & Bob Mosher	May 7, 1958	929A
Beaver feels neglected when his parents make such a big deal out of Wally making the baseball team, so he sets out to impress the family with his own talents. Beaver takes clarinet lessons but performs poorly and fails to make the school band, but he pretends otherwise, to hide his humiliation from the family. He carries his clarinet to school for weeks, thinking that he has plenty of time to tell them the truth. June finds a concert announcement in Beaver's pocket and the whole family plans to go. On the night of a school concert, Beaver plans to continue the charade to the last possible moment but the Cleavers have discovered his status and tell him something has come up so they must remain at home. Beaver is relieved and later thanks his father for sparing him the concert. Guests: Wendell Holmes as Mr. Willet, Douglas Wade as Boy with Trumpet, Jeri Weil as Judy Hensler, Stanley Fafara as Whitey Whitney.
31	31	"New Doctor"	Norman Tokar	Joe Connelly & Bob Mosher	May 14, 1958	933A
Wally is showered with attention and gifts from family and friends when he stays home from school sick with a sore throat and fever. The next day Beaver feigns illness expecting he'll get some loot, too. However, he is disappointed in his expectations. In addition, he learns that their regular doctor is away, and the replacement doctor, Dr. Bradley, is coming in his place. When Dr. Bradley arrives and finds Beaver well, he tells him the story of the boy who cried wolf. Beaver tells his parents he'll never pretend to be sick again. Ward tells him to eat his ice cream. Guests: Stuart Wade as Doctor Bradley, Ken Osmond as Eddie Haskell, "Tiger" Fafara as Tooey Brown, Stanley Fafara as Whitey Whitney, Jeri Weil as Judy Hensler.
32	32	"Beaver's Old Friend"	Norman Tokar	Dick Conway, Roland MacLane, Joe Connelly & Bob Mosher	May 21, 1958	931A
Beaver finds his old teddy bear, Billy, while he, Ward, and Wally clean out the garage. He reeks of turpentine, but that doesn't stop Beaver from wanting to save the bear. After being teased by his friends, Beaver reluctantly leaves the bear in the trash. When Beaver's teddy bear is carried away by the trash truck, he scurries after the truck and retrieves the bear. Ward and Wally had chided Beaver about his fondness for the toy and, having saved Billy, Beaver now hides him. Eventually, Beaver tells Wally why the bear means so much to him: Billy kept him company and provided comfort when he had the measles. Beaver says that was at their other house, so the first house seen in the series is not the first house the family lived in. The two boys then try to clean it up by dousing it with June's perfume. June finds the bear and has him dry-cleaned. Beaver recalls the comfort the bear offered him when he was sick, and gives the bear to a sick little boy across the street, hoping he'll be comforted, too. Guests: Jesse Kirkpatrick as Trash Man, Dennis Holmes as First Friend, David Halper as Second Friend, Stanley Fafara as Whitey Whitney.
33	33	"Wally's Job"	Norman Tokar	Joe Connelly & Bob Mosher	May 28, 1958	932A
Wally gets excited when Ward offers him a dollar to paint two garbage cans, until he finds out that Eddie's father paid someone three dollars for a similar job. Wally wants three dollars. Ward refuses and Wally turns the job down. Beaver offers to do the job. Wally is angry, thinking he should have been given another opportunity to do the job. Ward finally settles the quarrel by having each boy paint one can for fifty cents. When Ward and the boys run off to see a fire, June finishes the job and buys a hat. Guests: Ken Osmond as Eddie Haskell.
34	34	"Beaver's Bad Day"	Norman Tokar	John Whedon	June 4, 1958	935A
Eddie Haskell causes Beaver to rip the pants of his good Sunday suit while playing with Larry at a worksite. Eddie encourages Beaver to make up a lie about how it happened. Beaver tells his parents a dog was the cause. His parents believe he is lying and punish him. The next day, he and Wally return to the worksite to confront Eddie about his manipulating Beaver the previous time. Beaver rips his pants again and a dog is the cause this time. Wally tries to save him by backing his story. His parents once again believe he is lying. Ward is furious and sends both Wally and Beaver upstairs. Mrs. Mondello calls June and confirms Beaver's story. Ward and June agree they should have believed Beaver and go upstairs to apologize. Guests: Ken Osmond as Eddie Haskell, Rusty Stevens as Larry Mondello, Bobby Mittelstaedt as Boy at Worksite (uncredited).
35	35	"Boarding School"	Norman Tokar	Joe Connelly, Bob Mosher, Dick Conway & Roland MacLane	June 11, 1958	934A
Johnny Franklin, a former student at Wally's school, visits the Cleavers during his break at military academy. The boys love his stories and Wally asks his parents if he can attend the academy. June doesn't like the idea, but Ward agrees to consider an application. Eddie says Wally's parents want to send him to military academy because they want to get rid of him. Beaver asks Ward why he wants to get rid of Wally. Wally and his father decide Wally should remain at home and go to Mayfield High with his friends. Guests: Barry Curtis as Johnny Franklin, Ken Osmond as Eddie Haskell.
36	36	"Beaver and Henry"	Norman Tokar	Joe Connelly & Bob Mosher	June 18, 1958	937A
The Cleavers set a trap to catch the animal that's been chewing on June's flowers. A rabbit is caught in the trap and is caged. Beaver names it Henry and it soon has babies. Ward tells Wally not to pick up any of the babies as Henry, feeling scared, might shun a baby if it smells like a human. By the time Wally passes the information to Beaver, it is too late as Beaver has already picked up one of them. Gus tells Beaver to put talcum powder on the rabbits and the mother won't notice the human odor. Gus also tells him to put vanilla extract on the mother's nose. June notices that the rabbits smell different. Beaver confesses and Ward is disappointed he wasn't consulted. Beaver says his father is better at telling him what not to do rather than what to do. Guests: Burt Mustin as Gus the Fireman, Rusty Stevens as Larry Mondello. Larry talks about his unseen little brother, saying that he screams a lot; this is the only time a younger Mondello sibling is mentioned.
37	37	"Beaver Runs Away"	Norman Tokar	Joe Connelly & Bob Mosher	June 25, 1958	941A
Beaver gets into trouble when he's pressured by Larry to use Ward's new drill and they damage the garage wall. Beaver is determined to run away because he feels he is being unfairly reprimanded because Larry did the actual drilling. When Ward lets him go, Beaver seems confused but leaves anyway. When he doesn't return, June, furious, presses Ward to begin a search. Ward stubbornly refuses, so June leaves the house to search for him. When she can't find him, Ward calls the Mondello house and finds out he is there. June goes and gets Beaver, and brings him home. Beaver apologizes to his father and asks him how he felt as boy when he ran away and his father didn't come looking for him. Ward says he forgot for a moment what it was like when he was a boy. Guests: Rusty Stevens as Larry Mondello, Madge Blake as Mrs. Mondello.
38	38	"Beaver's Guest"	Norman Tokar	Joe Connelly & Bob Mosher	July 2, 1958	938A
Ward had a difficult week at work and wants some peace and quiet over the weekend. But Beaver already has a guest coming over and the Cleavers set up to have a barbecue outside. Larry Mondello arrives for the weekend stay but the boys fight and Larry wants to go home. Ward calls a taxi but the boys become pals again and Larry decides to stay. Late that night, Beaver rouses his parents. Larry has a stomach ache. June discovers the remains of four candy bars under his pillow and Ward says Larry has simply overeaten. The next day, when Mrs. Mondello arrives to take Larry home, Ward breathes a sigh of relief. Wally says he would like to have Eddie Haskell over next weekend. Guests: Rusty Stevens as Larry Mondello, Frank Sully as Cab Driver, Madge Blake as Mrs. Mondello.
39	39	"Cat Out of the Bag"	Norman Tokar	Story by : Dick Conway & Roland MacLane; Teleplay by : Joe Connelly & Bob Mosher	July 16, 1958	939A
The Donaldsons are going away for the weekend and want Wally and Beaver to water their lawn, pick up the papers, and feed their prize-winning cat Puff Puff. Eddie, wanting to hang out with Wally at the carnival, says it would be smarter if one of them did the work one day, and the other do the work the next day. Beaver is left to do the work and inadvertently leaves the gate open. Puff Puff is able to escape when she's chased by Eddie's dog. Late at night, the boys find her in a tree. With Ward's help, they bring the cat safely down. Later, Mr. Donaldson tells the Cleavers the boys have told him of their troubles and have refused payment. He says they're a couple of little characters. June says the two are a couple of "nice" little characters. Guests: Ray Kellogg as Mr. Donaldson, Ken Osmond as Eddie Haskell.
