= Captain Jack =

Captain Jack may refer to:

== People ==
- John Rackham (hanged 1720), an English pirate in the 18th century
- Captain Jack (Hawaiian) (died 1831), Naihekukui, commander of Kamehameha's fleet and father of Kalama
- Captain Jack (fl. 1830s on), Kadlitpinna, Kaurna man in colonial Adelaide, Australia
- Captain Jack (c. 1837–1873), Kintpuash, leader of the Modoc tribe in Oregon and California, United States
- Captain Jack (c. 1840-1882), Nicaagat, leader of the Utes of Colorado, United States, during the Battle of Milk Creek
- John Wallace Crawford aka "Captain Jack" (1847–1917), American Civil War veteran and Old West scout, poet of western lore
- Stephen Jackson, an American professional basketball player nicknamed "Captain Jack"

== In music ==
- Captain Jack (group), a German Eurodance act
  - "Captain Jack" (Captain Jack song), a song by Captain Jack from The Mission
- "Captain Jack" (Billy Joel song), a song by Billy Joel

== Film and television ==
- Captain Jack (film), a 1999 film starring Bob Hoskins
- "Captain Jack Harkness" (Torchwood episode), an episode of Torchwood.

== Characters ==
- Captain Jack Harkness, a central character in the TV series Torchwood and Doctor Who
  - Captain Jack Harkness, a guest character in Torchwood.
- Captain Jack Sparrow, the central character in the Pirates of the Caribbean films
- Captain Jack Absolute, a character in the 1775 play The Rivals
- "Captain Jack", an episode of TV series Leave It to Beaver (1957), and the name of an alligator in that episode
- Captain Jack, a character in The Office episode "Booze Cruise"
- Captain Jack, a character in the Babylon 5 episode "Racing Mars"
- Captain Jack, an alligator in The Simpsons episode "Kill the Alligator and Run"
- Captain Jack Aubrey, a fictional character in the Aubrey–Maturin novels by Patrick O'Brian

== See also ==
- "Jack Sparrow" (song), a 2011 song by The Lonely Island about Captain Jack Sparrow
