= Beaver Gets 'Spelled =

- Leave It to Beaver episode
- Jerry Mathers in "Beaver Gets 'Spelled".
- Episode no.: Season 1 Episode 1
- Directed by: Norman Tokar
- Written by: Joe Connelly; Bob Mosher
- Production code: 903A
- Original air date: October 4, 1957

Guest appearances
- Diane Brewster; Doris Packer; Jeri Weil; Burt Mustin; Stanley Fafara; Ralph Sanford

Episode chronology
← Previous —	Next → "Captain Jack"

"Beaver Gets 'Spelled" is the series premiere of the American television series Leave It to Beaver. The episode is the first episode of the first season of the show. It was written by Joe Connelly and Bob Mosher, and directed by Norman Tokar. The episode originally aired on CBS on October 4, 1957. It is also available on DVD.

== Plot summary ==
Diane Brewster as Miss Canfield.

Beaver's new teacher, Miss Canfield, gives him a note after class to take home. Beaver's classmates convince him that the note means he is going to be kicked out of school. Worried that he will be the first second-grader in the school's history to be "'spelled" (expelled), Beaver hides the note.

The next day, Miss Canfield finds the note under Beaver's desk and instructs him to take it home. Beaver loses the note on the way home. Wally helps Beaver in his predicament by writing a note (from "Mrs. Ward Cleaver") to Miss Canfield assuring her that Beaver has been whipped for his offense. The next day, Miss Canfield is at a loss trying to understand such a severe response to her request that Beaver play Smokey the Bear in a school pageant. Mrs. Rayburn, the school principal, realizes Beaver didn't show the note to his parents because he assumed it was about something bad, and advises Miss Canfield to call June to the school, to straighten the matter out. When Beaver discovers where his mother is headed, he runs away and climbs a tree. When Ward, June, and Wally find Beaver in the tree, they are unable to persuade him to come down. June decides to leave him there even if it rains. Beaver comes down to get his raincoat. The next day, he has a talk with Miss Canfield and asks her to call him "Beaver" rather than "Theodore". He offers her some tips on understanding second-graders. The following day, Beaver leaves for school carrying his most precious object for Miss Canfield — a rubber shrunken head.

== Cast and crew ==
Hugh Beaumont and Barbara Billingsley star as archetypal suburban couple, Ward and June Cleaver with Tony Dow and Jerry Mathers as their sons, Wally and Theodore "Beaver" Cleaver. Diane Brewster plays Miss Canfield, Beaver's teacher, with Doris Packer playing Grant Avenue Grammar School principal, Mrs. Rayburn. Jeri Weil and Stanley Fafara play Beaver's classmates, Judy Hensler and "Whitey" Whitney respectively while Burt Mustin and Ralph Sanford play Beaver's adult friends in the neighborhood, Gus, the fireman, and "Fats" Flannaghan, a junkyard operator. Steve Paylow appeared as the boy who informs the Cleavers about Beaver's whereabouts, while Gary Allen as First Man and Alan Reynolds as Second Man are onlookers in the scene where Beaver climbs a tree. The episode was written by the show's creators, Joe Connelly and Bob Mosher, and directed by Norman Tokar.

== See also ==
- List of Leave It to Beaver episodes
