= List of Leave It to Beaver episodes =

Leave It to Beaver is an American television situation comedy about an inquisitive and often naïve boy named Theodore "The Beaver" Cleaver (portrayed by Jerry Mathers) and his adventures at home, in school, and around his suburban neighborhood. The show was created by Amos 'n' Andy writers Joe Connelly and Bob Mosher. The series comprises 234, full-screen, black-and-white episodes, excluding the pilot. The show was televised from October 4, 1957, to June 20, 1963.

The pilot, titled "It's a Small World", aired on April 23, 1957. It featured Casey Adams as Ward Cleaver, and Paul Sullivan as Wally Cleaver. TV Land re-aired it on October 6, 2007, as part of their twenty-four-hour marathon to commemorate the show's 50th anniversary.

Universal Studios Home Entertainment has released seasons one and two of the series on DVD Region 1. The pilot episode is included on the season-one DVD. Shout! Factory released Season 3 on June 15, 2010, and the complete series set was released on June 29, 2010.

== Series overview ==
Season	Episodes	Originally released	
Season	Episodes	First released	Last released
Pilot		April 23, 1957	
1	39	October 4, 1957	July 16, 1958
2	39	October 2, 1958	June 25, 1959
3	39	October 3, 1959	June 25, 1960
4	39	October 1, 1960	June 24, 1961
5	39	September 30, 1961	June 30, 1962
6	39	September 27, 1962	June 20, 1963

== Episodes ==
=== Pilot (1957) ===
Title	Directed by	Written by	Original release date
"It's a Small World"	Jerry Hopper	Joe Connelly & Bob Mosher	April 23, 1957
Beaver and Wally collect 1,000 bottle caps thinking they can redeem them for a bicycle at the Franklin Milk Company. Mr. Baxter, a company executive, has heard nothing about such an offer and his call to the home office returns no information. Nevertheless, he sends the boys to a shop to select a bicycle at the company's expense. Mr. Baxter later learns no offer was ever extended and reclaims the bicycle. Ward buys the boys a new bicycle. Guests: Casey Adams (Max Showalter) as Ward Cleaver, Paul Sullivan as Wally Cleaver, Richard Deacon as Mr. Baxter, Diane Brewster as Miss Simms, Joseph Kearns as Mr. Fred Crowley, Russell Thorson as Man with Milk Bottles, Lennie Bremen as Milk Bar proprietor, Harry Shearer as Frankie Bennett, Tommy Randall as Frankie's friend, Tim Graham as Doc, Virginia Carroll as Nurse.

=== Season 1 (1957–58) ===
No. overall	No. in season	Title	Directed by	Written by	Original release date	Prod. code
1	1	"Beaver Gets 'Spelled"	Norman Tokar	Joe Connelly & Bob Mosher	October 4, 1957	903A
2	2	"Captain Jack"	Norman Tokar	Joe Connelly & Bob Mosher	October 11, 1957	901A
3	3	"The Black Eye"	Norman Tokar	Story by : Rik Vollaerts; Teleplay by : Joe Connelly & Bob Mosher	October 18, 1957	902A
4	4	"The Haircut"	Norman Tokar	Bill Manhoff	October 25, 1957	908A
5	5	"New Neighbors"	Norman Tokar	Joe Connelly & Bob Mosher	November 1, 1957	907A
6	6	"Brotherly Love"	Norman Tokar	Story by : Norman Tokar; Teleplay by : Joe Connelly & Bob Mosher	November 8, 1957	909A
7	7	"Water, Anyone?"	Norman Tokar	Clifford Goldsmith	November 15, 1957	904A
8	8	"Beaver's Crush"	Norman Tokar	Story by : Phil Leslie; Teleplay by : Joe Connelly & Bob Mosher	November 22, 1957	913A
9	9	"The Clubhouse"	Norman Tokar	Story by: Lydia Nathan; Teleplay by: Joe Connelly & Bob Mosher	November 29, 1957	911A
10	10	"Wally's Girl Trouble"	Norman Tokar	Ben Gershman & Mel Diamond	December 6, 1957	905A
11	11	"Beaver's Short Pants"	Norman Tokar	Joe Connelly & Bob Mosher	December 13, 1957	912A
12	12	"The Perfume Salesmen"	Norman Tokar	Mel Diamond & Ben Gershman	December 27, 1957	910A
13	13	"Voodoo Magic"	Norman Tokar	Bill Manhoff	January 3, 1958	914A
14	14	"Part Time Genius"	Norman Tokar	Story by : Hendrik "Rik" Vollaerts; Teleplay by : Joe Connelly & Bob Mosher	January 10, 1958	906A
15	15	"Party Invitation"	Norman Tokar	Mel Diamond & Ben Gershman	January 17, 1958	916A
16	16	"Lumpy Rutherford"	Norman Tokar	Joe Connelly & Bob Mosher	January 24, 1958	917A
17	17	"The Paper Route"	Norman Tokar	Fran van Hartesveldt, Joe Connelly & Bob Mosher	January 31, 1958	915A
18	18	"Child Care"	Norman Tokar	Joe Connelly & Bob Mosher	February 7, 1958	918A
19	19	"The Bank Account"	Norman Tokar	Phil Leslie	February 14, 1958	919A
20	20	"Lonesome Beaver"	Norman Tokar	Joe Connelly & Bob Mosher	February 28, 1958	920A
21	21	"Cleaning Up Beaver"	Norman Tokar	Bill Manhoff	March 7, 1958	922A
22	22	"The Perfect Father"	Norman Tokar	Story by : Fran Van Hartesveldt; Teleplay by : Joe Connelly & Bob Mosher	March 14, 1958	921A
23	23	"Beaver and Poncho"	Norman Tokar	Joe Connelly & Bob Mosher	March 21, 1958	924A
24	24	"The State vs. Beaver"	Norman Tokar	Joe Connelly & Bob Mosher	March 26, 1958	923A
25	25	"The Broken Window"	James Neilson	Joe Connelly & Bob Mosher	April 2, 1958	925A
26	26	"Train Trip"	Norman Tokar	Joe Connelly & Bob Mosher	April 9, 1958	926A
27	27	"My Brother's Girl"	Norman Tokar	Story by : Bill Manhoff; Teleplay by : Joe Connelly & Bob Mosher	April 16, 1958	927A
28	28	"Next Door Indians"	Norman Tokar	Joe Connelly & Bob Mosher; Suggested by a Story by: Robert Paul Smith	April 23, 1958	928A
29	29	"Tenting Tonight"	Norman Tokar	Story by : Fred Shevin; Teleplay by : Joe Connelly & Bob Mosher	April 30, 1958	930A
30	30	"Music Lesson"	Norman Tokar	Story by : Jack Patrick; Teleplay by : Joe Connelly & Bob Mosher	May 7, 1958	929A
31	31	"New Doctor"	Norman Tokar	Joe Connelly & Bob Mosher	May 14, 1958	933A
32	32	"Beaver's Old Friend"	Norman Tokar	Dick Conway, Roland MacLane, Joe Connelly & Bob Mosher	May 21, 1958	931A
33	33	"Wally's Job"	Norman Tokar	Joe Connelly & Bob Mosher	May 28, 1958	932A
34	34	"Beaver's Bad Day"	Norman Tokar	John Whedon	June 4, 1958	935A
35	35	"Boarding School"	Norman Tokar	Joe Connelly, Bob Mosher, Dick Conway & Roland MacLane	June 11, 1958	934A
36	36	"Beaver and Henry"	Norman Tokar	Joe Connelly & Bob Mosher	June 18, 1958	937A
37	37	"Beaver Runs Away"	Norman Tokar	Joe Connelly & Bob Mosher	June 25, 1958	941A
38	38	"Beaver's Guest"	Norman Tokar	Joe Connelly & Bob Mosher	July 2, 1958	938A
39	39	"Cat Out of the Bag"	Norman Tokar	Story by : Dick Conway & Roland MacLane; Teleplay by : Joe Connelly & Bob Mosher	July 16, 1958	939A

=== Season 2 (1958–59) ===
No. overall	No. in season	Title	Directed by	Written by	Original release date	Prod. code
40	1	"Beaver's Poem"	Norman Tokar	Joe Connelly, Bob Mosher, Dick Conway & Roland MacLane	October 2, 1958	936A
41	2	"Eddie's Girl"	Norman Tokar	Joe Connelly & Bob Mosher	October 9, 1958	955A
42	3	"Ward's Problem"	Norman Tokar	Story by : Ed James; Teleplay by : Joe Connelly & Bob Mosher	October 16, 1958	940A
43	4	"Beaver and Chuey"	Norman Tokar	George Tibbles	October 23, 1958	942A
44	5	"The Lost Watch"	Norman Tokar	Richard Baer	October 30, 1958	943A
45	6	"Her Idol"	Norman Tokar	Story by : Dick Conway & Roland MacLane; Teleplay by : Joe Connelly & Bob Mosher, Dick Conway & Roland MacLane	November 6, 1958	946A
46	7	"Beaver's Ring"	Norman Tokar	Story by : Ed James; Teleplay by : Joe Connelly & Bob Mosher	November 13, 1958	953A
47	8	"The Shave"	Norman Tokar	Bob Ross, Joe Connelly & Bob Mosher	November 20, 1958	950A
48	9	"The Pipe"	Norman Tokar	Story by : Fran Van Hartesveldt; Teleplay by : Joe Connelly & Bob Mosher	November 27, 1958	944A
49	10	"Wally's New Suit"	Norman Tokar	Richard Baer	December 4, 1958	949A
50	11	"School Play"	Norman Tokar	Joe Connelly & Bob Mosher	December 11, 1958	957A
51	12	"The Visiting Aunts"	Norman Tokar	Story by : Bob Ross; Teleplay by : Joe Connelly & Bob Mosher	December 18, 1958	951A
52	13	"Happy Weekend"	Norman Tokar	Joe Connelly & Bob Mosher	December 25, 1958	959A
53	14	"Wally's Present"	Norman Tokar	Story by : Keith Fowler & Norman Paul; Teleplay by : Joe Connelly, Bob Mosher, Keith Fowler & Norman Paul	January 1, 1959	945A
54	15	"The Grass is Always Greener"	Norman Tokar	Story by : John Whedon; Teleplay by : Joe Connelly & Bob Mosher	January 8, 1959	947A
55	16	"The Boat Builders"	Norman Tokar	Joe Connelly & Bob Mosher	January 15, 1959	958A
56	17	"Beaver Plays Hooky"	Norman Tokar	Story by : Dick Conway & Roland MacLane; Teleplay by : Joe Connelly & Bob Mosher, Dick Conway & Roland MacLane	January 22, 1959	960A
57	18	"The Garage Painters"	Norman Tokar	Joe Connelly & Bob Mosher	January 29, 1959	961A
58	19	"Wally's Pug Nose"	Norman Tokar	George Tibbles	February 5, 1959	963A
59	20	"Beaver's Pigeons"	David Butler	Joe Connelly & Bob Mosher	February 12, 1959	962A
60	21	"The Tooth"	David Butler	Story by : Bob Ross; Teleplay by : Bob Ross, Joe Connelly & Bob Mosher	February 19, 1959	952A
61	22	"Beaver Gets Adopted"	Norman Tokar	Joe Connelly & Bob Mosher	February 26, 1959	954A
62	23	"The Haunted House"	Norman Tokar	George Tibbles	March 5, 1959	964A
63	24	"The Bus Ride"	Norman Tokar	Joe Connelly & Bob Mosher	March 12, 1959	967A
64	25	"Beaver and Gilbert"	Norman Tokar	Teleplay by : Joe Connelly, Bob Mosher and George Tibbles	March 19, 1959	966A
65	26	"Price of Fame"	Norman Tokar	Story by : Dick Conway & Roland MacLane; Teleplay by : Joe Connelly & Bob Mosher	March 26, 1959	956A
66	27	"A Horse Named Nick"	Norman Tokar	Story by : Hugh Beaumont; Teleplay by : Joe Connelly & Bob Mosher	April 2, 1959	968A
67	28	"Beaver's Hero"	Norman Tokar	Joe Connelly & Bob Mosher	April 9, 1959	948A
68	29	"Beaver Says Good-bye"	Norman Tokar	George Tibbles, Joe Connelly & Bob Mosher	April 16, 1959	969A
69	30	"Beaver's Newspaper"	Norman Tokar	Elon Packard, Harry Winkler, Joe Connelly & Bob Mosher	April 23, 1959	970A
70	31	"Beaver's Sweater"	Norman Tokar	Katherine and Dale Eunson	April 30, 1959	971A
71	32	"Friendship"	Norman Tokar	Story by : Mathilde & Theodore Ferro; Teleplay by : Joe Connelly & Bob Mosher	May 7, 1959	972A
72	33	"Dance Contest"	Norman Tokar	Joe Connelly & Bob Mosher	May 14, 1959	973A
73	34	"Wally's Haircomb"	Norman Tokar	Story by : George Tibbles; Teleplay by : Joe Connelly & Bob Mosher	May 21, 1959	965A
74	35	"The Cookie Fund"	Norman Tokar	Joe Connelly & Bob Mosher	May 28, 1959	974A
75	36	"Forgotten Party"	Norman Tokar	Joe Connelly & Bob Mosher	June 4, 1959	975A
76	37	"Beaver the Athlete"	Norman Tokar	Story by : George Tibbles; Teleplay by : Joe Connelly & Bob Mosher	June 11, 1959	976A
77	38	"Found Money"	Norman Tokar	Katherine & Dale Eunson	June 18, 1959	977A
78	39	"Most Interesting Character"	Norman Tokar	Joe Connelly, Bob Mosher, Mathilde & Theodore Ferro	June 25, 1959	978A

=== Season 3 (1959–60) ===
No. overall	No. in season	Title	Directed by	Written by	Original release date	Prod. code
79	1	"Blind Date Committee"	Norman Tokar	Katherine & Dale Eunson & Joe Connelly & Bob Mosher	October 3, 1959	13204
80	2	"Beaver Takes a Bath"	Norman Tokar	Joe Connelly & Bob Mosher	October 10, 1959	13208
81	3	"School Bus"	Norman Tokar	Joe Connelly & Bob Mosher	October 17, 1959	13201
82	4	"Beaver's Prize"	Norman Tokar	Joe Connelly & Bob Mosher	October 24, 1959	13209
83	5	"Baby Picture"	Norman Tokar	Joe Connelly & Bob Mosher	October 31, 1959	13212
84	6	"Beaver Takes a Walk"	Norman Tokar	Story by : Theodore and Mathilde Ferro; Teleplay by : Joe Connelly & Bob Mosher	November 7, 1959	13206
85	7	"Borrowed Boat"	Norman Tokar	Joe Connelly & Bob Mosher	November 14, 1959	13210
86	8	"Beaver's Tree"	Norman Tokar	Story by : Dick Conway & Roland MacLane; Teleplay by : Joe Connelly & Bob Mosher	November 21, 1959	13202
87	9	"Teacher Comes to Dinner"	Norman Tokar	Story by : Joe Connelly & Bob Mosher; Teleplay by : Katherine & Dale Eunson	November 28, 1959	13213
88	10	"Beaver's Fortune"	Norman Tokar	Story by : Joe Connelly & Bob Mosher; Teleplay by : Theodore and Mathilde Ferro	December 5, 1959	13205
89	11	"Beaver Makes a Loan"	David Butler	Joe Connelly & Bob Mosher	December 12, 1959	13219
90	12	"Beaver the Magician"	David Butler	George Tibbles, Joe Connelly & Bob Mosher	December 19, 1959	13218
91	13	"June's Birthday"	David Butler	Story by : Katherine & Dale Eunson; Teleplay by : Joe Connelly & Bob Mosher	December 26, 1959	13214
92	14	"Tire Trouble"	Norman Tokar	Story by : Jon Zimmer; Teleplay by : Joe Connelly & Bob Mosher	January 2, 1960	13220
93	15	"Larry Hides Out"	David Butler	Joe Connelly & Bob Mosher	January 9, 1960	13221
94	16	"Pet Fair"	David Butler	Katherine & Dale Eunson	January 16, 1960	13215
95	17	"Wally's Test"	Norman Tokar	Joe Connelly & Bob Mosher	January 23, 1960	13222
96	18	"Beaver's Library Book"	Norman Tokar	Joe Connelly & Bob Mosher	January 30, 1960	13211
97	19	"Wally's Election"	Norman Tokar	Joe Connelly & Bob Mosher	February 6, 1960	13216
98	20	"Beaver and Andy"	David Butler	Joe Connelly & Bob Mosher	February 13, 1960	13223
99	21	"Beaver's Dance"	Bretaigne Windust	Joe Connelly & Bob Mosher	February 20, 1960	13224
100	22	"Larry's Club"	David Butler	Joe Connelly & Bob Mosher	February 27, 1960	13226
101	23	"School Sweater"	Norman Tokar	Joe Connelly & Bob Mosher	March 5, 1960	13217
102	24	"The Hypnotist"	David Butler	Story by : Katherine & Dale Eunson; Teleplay by : Joe Connelly & Bob Mosher	March 12, 1960	13225
103	25	"Wally and Alma"	Hugh Beaumont	Joe Connelly & Bob Mosher	March 19, 1960	13227
104	26	"Beaver's Bike"	Hugh Beaumont	Joe Connelly & Bob Mosher	March 26, 1960	13231
105	27	"Wally's Orchid"	Norman Abbott	Bob Ross, Joe Connelly & Bob Mosher	April 2, 1960	13230
106	28	"Ward's Baseball"	Earl Bellamy	Joe Connelly & Bob Mosher	April 9, 1960	13228
107	29	"Beaver's Monkey"	Norman Abbott	George Tibbles	April 16, 1960	13229
108	30	"Beaver Finds a Wallet"	David Butler	Story by : Mathilde and Theodore Ferro; Teleplay by : Joe Connelly & Bob Mosher	April 23, 1960	13207
109	31	"Mother's Day Composition"	Norman Abbott	Bob Ross, Joe Connelly & Bob Mosher	April 30, 1960	13232
110	32	"Beaver and Violet"	David Butler	Joe Connelly & Bob Mosher	May 7, 1960	13233
111	33	"The Spot Removers"	Norman Tokar	Bob Ross, Joe Connelly & Bob Mosher	May 14, 1960	13234
112	34	"Beaver, the Model"	Norman Tokar	Joe Connelly & Bob Mosher	May 21, 1960	13235
113	35	"Wally, the Businessman"	Norman Tokar	Joe Connelly & Bob Mosher	May 28, 1960	13236
114	36	"Beaver and Ivanhoe"	David Butler	Joe Connelly & Bob Mosher	June 4, 1960	13237
115	37	"Wally's Play"	David Butler	Story by : George Tibbles; Teleplay by : Joe Connelly & Bob Mosher	June 11, 1960	13203
116	38	"The Last Day of School"	Norman Abbott	Joe Connelly & Bob Mosher	June 18, 1960	13239
117	39	"Beaver's Team"	David Butler	Story by : Edward J. O'Connor; Teleplay by : Joe Connelly & Bob Mosher	June 25, 1960	13238

=== Season 4 (1960–61) ===
No. overall	No. in season	Title	Directed by	Written by	Original release date	Prod. code
118	1	"Beaver Won't Eat"	Norman Abbott	Bob Ross	October 1, 1960	13254
119	2	"Beaver's House Guest"	Norman Abbott	Arthur Kober	October 8, 1960	13251
120	3	"Beaver Becomes a Hero"	Gene Reynolds	Story by : Frank Gabrielson; Teleplay by : Joe Connelly & Bob Mosher	October 15, 1960	13252
121	4	"Wally, the Lifeguard"	Andrew McCullough	George Tibbles, Joe Connelly & Bob Mosher	October 22, 1960	13256
122	5	"Beaver's Freckles"	Norman Abbott	Story by : William Cowley and Peggy Chantler Dick (as Peggy Chantler); Teleplay by : Joe Connelly & Bob Mosher	October 29, 1960	13253
123	6	"Beaver's Big Contest"	Gene Reynolds	Story by : Arthur Kober; Teleplay by : Joe Connelly & Bob Mosher	November 5, 1960	13255
124	7	"Miss Landers' Fiancé"	Norman Abbott	Joe Connelly & Bob Mosher	November 12, 1960	13261
125	8	"Eddie's Double-Cross"	Norman Abbott	Joe Connelly & Bob Mosher	November 19, 1960	13260
126	9	"Beaver's I.Q."	Norman Abbott	Theodore and Mathilde Ferro	November 26, 1960	13257
127	10	"Wally's Glamour Girl"	Norman Abbott	Joe Connelly & Bob Mosher	December 3, 1960	13259
128	11	"Chuckie's New Shoes"	Norman Abbott	Joe Connelly & Bob Mosher	December 10, 1960	13262
129	12	"Beaver and Kenneth"	Norman Abbott	Joe Connelly & Bob Mosher	December 17, 1960	13265
130	13	"Beaver's Accordion"	Gene Reynolds	Joe Connelly & Bob Mosher	December 24, 1960	13266
131	14	"Uncle Billy"	Norman Abbott	Joe Connelly & Bob Mosher	December 31, 1960	13268
132	15	"Teacher's Daughter"	Norman Abbott	Story by : Alan Lipscott and Bob Fisher; Teleplay by : Joe Connelly & Bob Mosher	January 7, 1961	13264
133	16	"Ward's Millions"	Hugh Beaumont	Story by : Theodore and Mathilde Ferro; Teleplay by : Joe Connelly & Bob Mosher	January 14, 1961	13263
134	17	"Beaver's Secret Life"	Norman Abbott	Wilton Schiller and Joe Connelly & Bob Mosher	January 21, 1961	13269
135	18	"Wally's Track Meet"	Norman Abbott	Joe Connelly & Bob Mosher	January 28, 1961	13270
136	19	"Beaver's Old Buddy"	Norman Abbott	Dick Conway & Roland MacLane and Joe Connelly & Bob Mosher	February 4, 1961	13271
137	20	"Beaver's Tonsils"	Norman Abbott	Theodore and Mathilde Ferro and Joe Connelly & Bob Mosher	February 11, 1961	13272
138	21	"The Big Fish Count"	Norman Abbott	Dick Conway & Roland MacLane and Joe Connelly & Bob Mosher	February 18, 1961	13273
139	22	"Beaver's Poster"	Norman Abbott	Story by : Ellis Marcus; Teleplay by : Joe Connelly & Bob Mosher	February 25, 1961	13275
140	23	"Mother's Helper"	Norman Abbott	Dick Conway & Roland MacLane and Joe Connelly & Bob Mosher	March 4, 1961	13274
141	24	"The Dramatic Club"	Dann Cahn	Joe Connelly & Bob Mosher	March 11, 1961	13267
142	25	"Wally and Dudley"	Hugh Beaumont	George Tibbles	March 18, 1961	13276
143	26	"Eddie Spends the Night"	Norman Abbott	Dick Conway & Roland MacLane and Joe Connelly & Bob Mosher	March 25, 1961	13278
144	27	"Beaver's Report Card"	Norman Abbott	Story by : Theodore and Mathilde Ferro; Teleplay by : Joe Connelly & Bob Mosher	April 1, 1961	13277
145	28	"Mistaken Identity"	Norman Abbott	Joe Connelly & Bob Mosher	April 8, 1961	13280
146	29	"Wally's Dream Girl"	Norman Abbott	Katherine and Dale Eunson	April 15, 1961	13279
147	30	"The School Picture"	Norman Abbott	Story by : Joe Connelly & Bob Mosher; Teleplay by : Dick Conway & Roland MacLane	April 22, 1961	13281
148	31	"Beaver's Rat"	Hugh Beaumont	Joe Connelly & Bob Mosher	April 29, 1961	13285
149	32	"In the Soup"	Norman Abbott	Story by : Dick Conway, Roland MacLane; Teleplay by : Joe Connelly, Bob Mosher	May 6, 1961	13287
150	33	"Community Chest"	Norman Abbott	Raphael Blau, Joe Connelly & Bob Mosher	May 13, 1961	13284
151	34	"Junior Fire Chief"	Norman Abbott	Bill Manhoff , Dick Conway & Roland MacLane and Joe Connelly & Bob Mosher	May 20, 1961	13288
152	35	"Beaver's Frogs"	Norman Abbott	Lou Breslow and Joseph Hoffman	May 27, 1961	13282
153	36	"Beaver Goes in Business"	Norman Abbott	Dick Conway & Roland MacLane and Joe Connelly & Bob Mosher	June 3, 1961	13258
154	37	"Kite Day"	Norman Abbott	Story by : Katherine & Dale Eunson; Teleplay by : Joe Connelly & Bob Mosher	June 10, 1961	13286
155	38	"Beaver's Doll Buggy"	Anton M. Leader	Dick Conway & Roland MacLane and Joe Connelly & Bob Mosher	June 17, 1961	13289
156	39	"Substitute Father"	David Butler	Joe Connelly & Bob Mosher	June 24, 1961	13290

=== Season 5 (1961–62) ===
No. overall	No. in season	Title	Directed by	Written by	Original release date	Prod. code
157	1	"Wally Goes Steady"	Norman Abbott	Story by : Dick Conway & Roland MacLane; Teleplay by : Joe Connelly & Bob Mosher	September 30, 1961	16108
158	2	"No Time for Babysitters"	David Butler	Dick Conway & Roland MacLane	October 7, 1961	16107
159	3	"Wally's Car"	David Butler	Dick Conway & Roland MacLane	October 14, 1961	16103
160	4	"Beaver's Birthday"	Hugh Beaumont	Story by : Bob Ross; Teleplay by : Dick Conway & Roland MacLane	October 21, 1961	16110
161	5	"Beaver's Cat Problem"	David Butler	Joe Connelly & Bob Mosher	November 4, 1961	16112
162	6	"Wally's Weekend Job"	Norman Abbott	Dick Conway & Roland MacLane	November 11, 1961	16102
163	7	"Beaver Takes a Drive"	Charles Haas	Dick Conway & Roland MacLane	November 18, 1961	16111
164	8	"Wally's Big Date"	David Butler	Story by : Kenneth A. Enochs; Teleplay by : Bob Ross	November 25, 1961	16106
165	9	"Beaver's Ice Skates"	Hugh Beaumont	Joseph Hoffman	December 2, 1961	16114
166	10	"Weekend Invitation"	David Butler	Joe Connelly & Bob Mosher and Dick Conway & Roland MacLane	December 9, 1961	16113
167	11	"Beaver's English Test"	Norman Abbott	Dick Conway & Roland MacLane	December 16, 1961	16116
168	12	"Wally's Chauffeur"	Hugh Beaumont	Dick Conway & Roland MacLane	December 23, 1961	16117
169	13	"Beaver's First Date"	David Butler	Story by : Joseph Hoffman & Lou Breslow; Teleplay by : Joe Connelly & Bob Mosher	December 30, 1961	16105
170	14	"Ward's Golf Clubs"	David Butler	Bob Ross	January 6, 1962	16119
171	15	"Farewell to Penny"	David Butler	Dick Conway & Roland MacLane	January 13, 1962	16118
172	16	"Beaver, the Bunny"	Anton M. Leader	Dick Conway & Roland MacLane	January 20, 1962	16121
173	17	"Beaver's Electric Trains"	Hugh Beaumont	Dick Conway & Roland MacLane	January 27, 1962	16120
174	18	"Beaver's Long Night"	Hugh Beaumont	Dick Conway & Roland MacLane	February 3, 1962	16124
175	19	"Beaver's Jacket"	David Butler	Bob Ross	February 10, 1962	16125
176	20	"Nobody Loves Me"	David Butler	Story by : Joe Connelly & Bob Mosher; Teleplay by : Katherine and Dale Eunson	February 17, 1962	16122
177	21	"Beaver's Fear"	David Butler	Dick Conway & Roland MacLane	February 24, 1962	16126
178	22	"Three Boys and a Burro"	David Butler	Dick Conway & Roland MacLane	March 3, 1962	16129
179	23	"Eddie Quits School"	Jeffrey Hayden	Dick Conway & Roland MacLane	March 10, 1962	16127
180	24	"Wally Stays at Lumpy's"	David Butler	Dick Conway & Roland MacLane	March 17, 1962	16130
181	25	"Beaver's Laundry"	David Butler	Joseph Hoffman	March 24, 1962	16123
182	26	"Lumpy's Car Trouble"	David Butler	Dick Conway & Roland MacLane and Joe Connelly & Bob Mosher	March 31, 1962	16132
183	27	"Beaver the Babysitter"	David Butler	Joseph Hoffman	April 7, 1962	16133
184	28	"The Younger Brother"	David Butler	Dick Conway & Roland MacLane	April 14, 1962	16131
185	29	"Beaver's Typewriter"	David Butler	Dick Conway & Roland MacLane	April 21, 1962	16134
186	30	"The Merchant Marine"	David Butler	Dick Conway & Roland MacLane	April 28, 1962	16136
187	31	"Brother Versus Brother"	David Butler	Bob Ross	May 5, 1962	16135
188	32	"The Yard Birds"	David Butler	Dick Conway & Roland MacLane	May 12, 1962	16137
189	33	"Tennis, Anyone?"	Hugh Beaumont	Dick Conway & Roland MacLane	May 19, 1962	16138
190	34	"One of the Boys"	Jeffrey Hayden	Joe Connelly & Bob Mosher and Gwen Gielgud	May 26, 1962	16104
191	35	"Sweatshirt Monsters"	David Butler	Dick Conway & Roland MacLane	June 2, 1962	16139
192	36	"A Night in the Woods"	David Butler	Dick Conway & Roland MacLane	June 9, 1962	16140
193	37	"Long Distance Call"	Norman Abbott	Dick Conway & Roland MacLane	June 16, 1962	16143
194	38	"Stocks and Bonds"	Norman Abbott	Story by : Joe Connelly & Bob Mosher; Teleplay by : Allan Manings	June 23, 1962	16141
195	39	"Un-Togetherness"	Norman Abbott	Dick Conway & Roland MacLane	June 30, 1962	16147

=== Season 6 (1962–63) ===
No. overall	No. in season	Title	Directed by	Written by	Original release date	Prod. code
196	1	"Wally's Dinner Date"	Norman Abbott	Story by : Joe Connelly & Bob Mosher; Teleplay by : Katherine & Dale Unson	September 27, 1962	16154
197	2	"Beaver's Football Award"	David Butler	Dick Conway & Roland MacLane	October 4, 1962	16159
198	3	"Wally's License"	Norman Abbott	Bob Ross	October 11, 1962	16151
199	4	"The Late Edition"	Norman Abbott	Dick Conway & Roland MacLane	October 18, 1962	16157
200	5	"Double Date"	David Butler	Dick Conway & Roland MacLane	October 25, 1962	16160
201	6	"Eddie, the Businessman"	Hugh Beaumont	Story by : Joe Connelly & Bob Mosher; Teleplay by : Dick Conway & Roland MacLane	November 1, 1962	16158
202	7	"Tell It to Ella"	David Butler	Dick Conway & Roland MacLane	November 8, 1962	16162
203	8	"Bachelor at Large"	Hugh Beaumont	Dick Conway & Roland MacLane	November 15, 1962	16163
204	9	"Beaver Joins a Record Club"	David Butler	Dick Conway & Roland MacLane	November 22, 1962	16161
205	10	"Wally's Car Accident"	Hugh Beaumont	Teleplay by : Dick Conway & Roland MacLane; From a Story by: William Gargaro, Jr.	November 29, 1962	16165
206	11	"Beaver, the Sheep Dog"	David Butler	Dick Conway & Roland MacLane	December 6, 1962	16164
207	12	"Beaver, the Hero"	David Butler	Dick Conway & Roland MacLane	December 13, 1962	16166
208	13	"Beaver's Autobiography"	David Butler	Joseph Hoffman	December 20, 1962	16156
209	14	"The Party Spoiler"	Norman Abbott	Dick Conway & Roland MacLane	December 27, 1962	16167
210	15	"The Mustache"	Hugh Beaumont	Dick Conway & Roland MacLane	January 3, 1963	16168
211	16	"Wally Buys a Car"	David Butler	Story by : Joe Connelly & Bob Mosher; Teleplay by : Wilton Schiller	January 10, 1963	16153
212	17	"The Parking Attendants"	Earl Bellamy	Dick Conway & Roland MacLane	January 17, 1963	16169
213	18	"More Blessed to Give"	Hugh Beaumont	Dick Conway & Roland MacLane	January 24, 1963	16170
214	19	"Beaver's Good Deed"	David Butler	Dick Conway & Roland MacLane	January 31, 1963	16171
215	20	"The Credit Card"	David Butler	Dick Conway & Roland MacLane	February 7, 1963	16172
216	21	"Beaver the Caddy"	Earl Bellamy	Dick Conway & Roland MacLane	February 14, 1963	16176
217	22	"Beaver on TV"	David Butler	Dick Conway & Roland MacLane	February 21, 1963	16174
218	23	"Box Office Attraction"	David Butler	Dick Conway & Roland MacLane and Joe Connelly & Bob Mosher	February 28, 1963	16175
219	24	"Lumpy's Scholarship"	Hugh Beaumont	Dick Conway & Roland MacLane	March 7, 1963	16177
220	25	"The Silent Treatment"	David Butler	Theodore and Mathilde Ferro	March 14, 1963	16178
221	26	"Uncle Billy's Visit"	David Butler	Dick Conway & Roland MacLane and Joe Connelly & Bob Mosher	March 21, 1963	16173
222	27	"Beaver's Prep School"	Hugh Beaumont	Dick Conway & Roland MacLane and Joe Connelly & Bob Mosher	March 28, 1963	16180
223	28	"Wally and the Fraternity"	David Butler	Dick Conway & Roland MacLane	April 4, 1963	16181
224	29	"Eddie's Sweater"	Earl Bellamy	Story by : Kenneth Enochs; Teleplay by : Joe Connelly & Bob Mosher	April 11, 1963	16179
225	30	"The Book Report"	Hugh Beaumont	Dick Conway & Roland MacLane	April 18, 1963	16182
226	31	"The Poor Loser"	David Butler	Dick Conway & Roland MacLane	April 25, 1963	16183
227	32	"Don Juan Beaver"	Hugh Beaumont	Teleplay by : Joe Connelly & Bob Mosher; From a Story by: David Levinson	May 2, 1963	16185
228	33	"Summer in Alaska"	David Butler	Dick Conway & Roland MacLane	May 9, 1963	16184
229	34	"Beaver's Graduation"	Hugh Beaumont	Dick Conway & Roland MacLane	May 16, 1963	16186
230	35	"Wally's Practical Joke"	David Butler	Joe Connelly & Bob Mosher	May 23, 1963	16187
231	36	"The All-Night Party"	David Butler	Dick Conway & Roland MacLane	May 30, 1963	16188
232	37	"Beaver Sees America"	Hugh Beaumont	Story by : Katherine & Dale Eunson; Teleplay by : Katherine & Dale Eunson and Joe Connelly & Bob Mosher	June 6, 1963	16189
233	38	"The Clothing Drive"	Charles Haas	Allan Manings	June 13, 1963	16155
234	39	"Family Scrapbook"	Hugh Beaumont	Joe Connelly & Bob Mosher	June 20, 1963	16190
