= Howard Allison Sturtzel =

American writer

- Born: 1894; Minnesota, U.S.
- Died: 1985 (aged 90–91)
- Other names: Paul Annixter
- Occupation: Writer

Howard Allison Sturtzel (1894–1985) was an American writer, including of popular children's books. He wrote books with his wife, under the name Jane and Paul Annixter. The couple's novel work, primarily equestrian fiction, consisted of four books, two of which were a part of the "A Penny of Paintrock" series. In addition, the couple are also accredited for over 500 short stories. The couple enjoyed an active and natural lifestyle in Pasadena, which reflected in their writings that most often involved animals and nature.

In 1920, Sturtzel married Jane Levington Comfort, daughter of writer Will Levington Comfort, the latter having mentored and collaborated with Sturtzel. Born on June 22, 1903, in Detroit, Michigan, Jane Comfort was also a writer: her first novel, an autobiographical work of her relationship with her father, was entitled "From These Beginnings", and was published in 1937. Her father had introduced her to writing at an early age, and influenced her early writings, in part with assigned readings that allowed written expression and reading to become an important part of her life. When Jane Comfort's husband suffered writer's block many years later, she collaborated with him as Jane Annixter. Other works of hers can also be found under her maiden name of Jane Levington Comfort, including the adult novel, "Time Out for Eternity" (New York, Dutton, 1938), and the short story Nedra Closes the Door (Holland's Magazine, 1934). Among the items of correspondence of artist Agnes Lawrence Pelton archived at the Smithsonian Institution's Archives of American Art are "many addressed to Jane Levington Comfort." Jane died on January 13, 1996.

In 1950, A. A. Wyn published a book by Paul Annixter entitled "Swiftwater," about a backwoods family trying to protect a herd of wild geese. Disney created the movie, Those Calloways, based on the book, in 1965.
