= Will Levington Comfort =

American novelist (1878–1932)

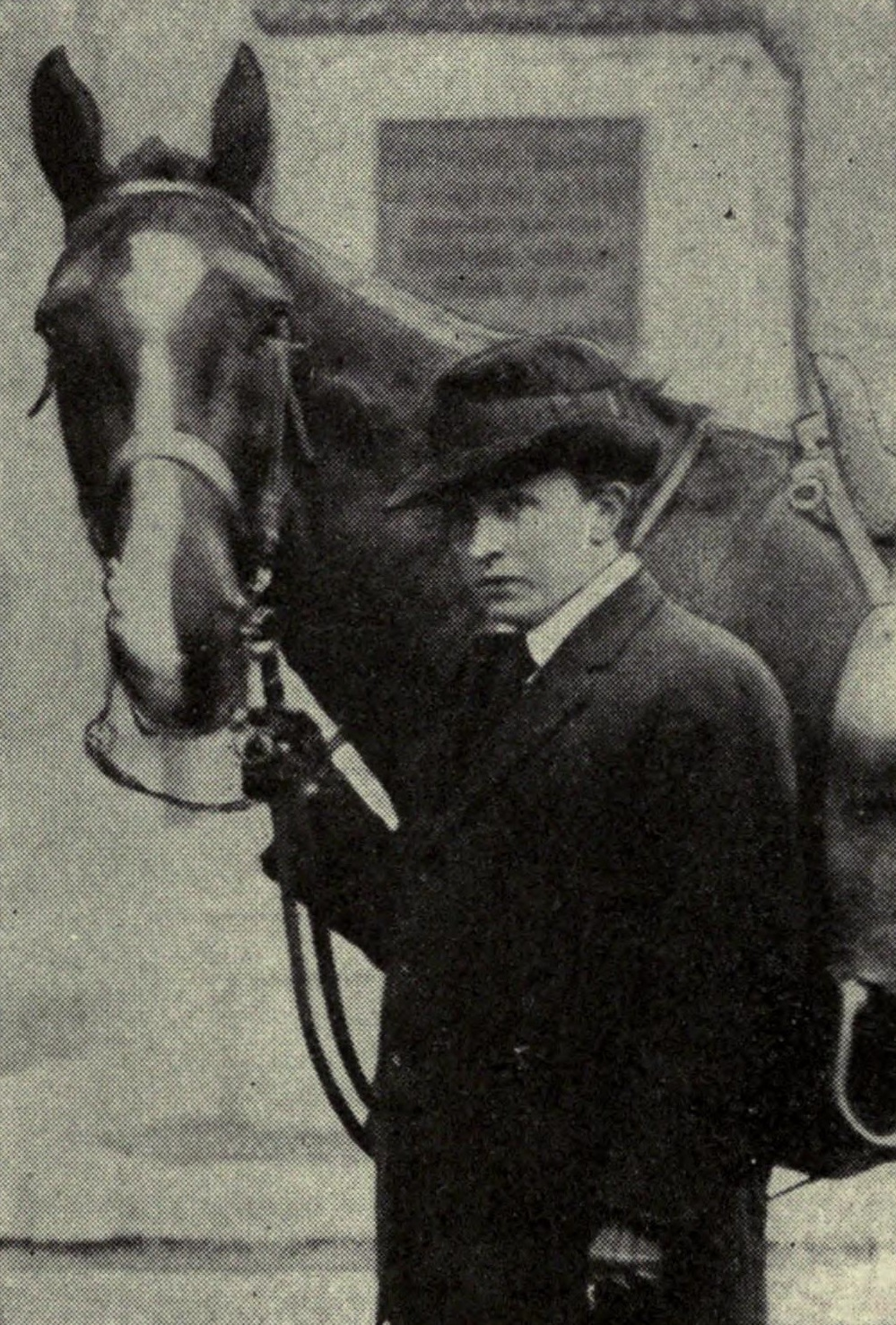
- Born: February 17, 1878; Kalamazoo, Michigan
- Died: November 2, 1932 (aged 54); Los Angeles, California
- Occupation: Writer
- Spouse: Ada Duffie
- Children: Jane Levington, John Duffie, Tom Tyrone

Will Levington Comfort (February 17, 1878 – November 2, 1932) was a U.S. writer, known primarily for adventure novels such as Apache. Three of Comfort's works served as the story for feature films. Somewhere in Sonora, based on his novel Somewhere south of Sonora, was remade in 1933 starring John Wayne.

The Will Levington Comfort Letters (2 volumes, 1920–21) deal with theosophical subjects, and influenced among others Alice Bailey. Comfort introduced composer/astrologer Dane Rudhyar to Marc Edmund Jones who introduced Rudhyar to the study of astrology. Rudhyar married Comfort's secretary, Maria Contento. Comfort was also an influence on painters Mabel Alvarez and Agnes Pelton.

== Biography ==
Comfort was educated in Detroit, Michigan public schools, and then at Albion College, Albion, Michigan. He gained experience as a newspaper reporter in Detroit, Michigan, Cincinnati, Ohio, and Covington, Kentucky. In the Spanish–American War he served in the 5th U.S. Cavalry. Later, in 1899, he became a war correspondent. In connection with his correspondent's duties, he traveled in the Philippines and China. In 1904 he also traveled in the Russian Empire and Japan as a correspondent. Later he lived in Highland Park, a suburb of Los Angeles, California. At this period of his life, when he was concerned with spiritual matters, he published two periodicals, The Glass Hive and the Reconstruction Letters.

== Family ==
Comfort was born on February 17, 1878, near Kalamazoo, MI, to the druggist Silas Hopkins Comfort (c. 1846–1898) and Jane Levington (1850–1926), who had immigrated from Ireland. His father's maternal grandfather was Capt. Benjamin Hopkins, who founded the town of Spring Lake, Michigan.

On September 30, 1900, in Detroit, Comfort married Ada Duffie Mullholland (1872–1938), widow of Clarence M. Mullholland. They had three children. Their daughter, Jane Levington Comfort (1903–1996), also became a novelist, writing works on her own and in tandem with her husband, Howard Allison Sturtzel (1894–1985), who used the pen name "Paul Annixter". Their two sons were writer John Duffie Comfort (b. c. 1908) and artist Tom Tyrone Comfort (1909–1939).

Will Levington Comfort died in Los Angeles on November 2, 1932.

== Works ==
- Trooper Tales; A Series of Sketches of the Real American Private Soldier (1899).
- The Lady of Fallen Star Island (1902).
- Routledge Rides Alone (1910).
- She Buildeth her House (1911).
- Fate Knocks at the Door; A Novel (1912).
- The Road of Living Men; A Novel (1913).
- Down Among Men (1913).
- Midstream; A Chronicle at halfway (1914).
- Red Fleece (1915).
- Lot & Company (1915).
- Child and Country; A Book of the Younger Generation (1915).
- Chautonville (1915). Short story in The Masses and republished in The Best Short Stories of 1915.
- The Last Ditch (1916).
- The Shielding Wing (1918).
- The Hive (1918).
- The Yellow Lord (1919).
- Magic Hours; A Romance of the East (1920).
- Son of Power (1920).
- This Man's World (1921).
- The public square (1923).
- Somewhere South in Sonora (1925).
- Samadhi (1927).
- Apache (1931).
- The Pilot Comes Aboard (1932).

== See also ==
- Zamin Ki Dost
