= Saleni Armstrong-Hopkins =

American physician

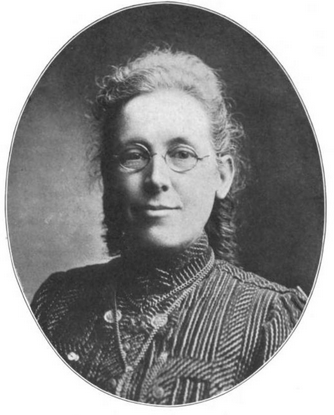
- Saleni Armstrong-Hopkins, from a 1908 publication.
- Born: Saleni Armstrong, Salini Armstrong-Hopkins; January 21, 1855; London, Ontario
- Occupations: Physician, author
- Relatives: Zamin Ki Dost (sister)

Saleni Armstrong-Hopkins (born January 21, 1855), born Saleni Armstrong, and sometimes seen as Salini Armstrong-Hopkins, was a Canadian-born American physician, medical missionary, and author.

== Early life and education ==
Saleni Armstrong was born in London, Ontario, the daughter of William Leonard Armstrong and Elizabeth Summers Armstrong. Her father was a Union Army surgeon during the American Civil War. She was raised in Michigan and Nebraska.

Armstrong attended Northwestern University for a year and graduated from the Woman's Medical College of Pennsylvania in 1885, with an internship in gynecology and obstetrics at the Philadelphia Lying-in Charity Hospital. She also studied at Mount Vernon Institute of Elocution and Languages.

== Career ==
Armstrong founded and ran an orphanage in Platte County, Nebraska, as a young doctor. She became a medical missionary in India as a single woman in 1886, serving with her sister Willimina L. Armstrong, and later with her husband, Methodist clergyman George Armstrong-Hopkins. She founded and directed a hospital and a nurses' training school at Khetwadi from 1887 to 1889. She was physician in charge at Lady Atchison Hospital in Lahore and a hospital in Hyderabad, Sindh from 1889 to 1893. From 1893 to 1895, she was on the staff of a hospital in Omaha. She sponsored several Indian students to attend college in the United States. The Armstrong-Hopkinses went to Bombay in 1912; she retired from the mission field after her husband's death in 1918.

In 1899, Armstrong-Hopkins sued her superior, Methodist bishop James Mills Thoburn, for slander. She sued him again in 1907 for libel, and won an award of $500. Thoburn had claimed that Armstrong-Hopkins was spending lavishly on dresses, stockings, shoes, and hats for her Indian patients. She held a medical license in Nebraska from 1894, but was refused a license to practice in Washington, D. C. in 1903, when the district's board of medical supervisors questioned her credentials and asked her to sit for an examination.

Books by Armstrong-Hopkins included Within the Purdah (1898), Fruit of Suffering (a book of poems), Pork and Mustard, and Khetwadi Castle (1900). She gave lectures on her experiences in India to women's groups and at church events.

== Personal life ==
In 1893, Saleni Armstrong married George Franklin Hopkins (1855-1918), as his second wife. They both used the surname Armstrong-Hopkins after they married, and their legal change to the hyphenated surname made headlines in 1905. In 1926, she was on a list of "Lost Alumnae" of the Woman's Medical College of Pennsylvania; her alumnae association had lost track of her address. Her younger sister Willimina Leonora Armstrong was known later in life as Zamin Ki Dost, a physician, writer, and lecturer on Eastern mysticism, based in Los Angeles.
