= Eric Snowden =

English–American actor born in 1888

- Eric Snowden in Leave It to Beaver 1958
- Born: Eric Snowdon; August 12, 1888; London, England
- Died: June 27, 1979 (aged 90); Bellevue, Washington
- Known for: The Burns and Allen Show, The Lion Man, Leave It to Beaver

Eric Snowden (August 8, 1888 – June 27, 1979) was an English-born actor who appeared in radio, films and television.

== Biography ==
Snowden was born in London, England, on August 8, 1888. He died in Bellevue, Washington, on June 27, 1979.

== Radio ==
Snowden was part of the cast of, among others, The New Adventures of Sherlock Holmes (1949–1950, as Dr. Watson), The Burns and Allen Show (1932–1950), Encore Theater (1946–1949), Escape (1947–1954), and Favorite Story (1946–1949). Snowden briefly appears in the January 8, 1950, episode of The Jack Benny Program. Snowden appeared in episode 626 of the radio program Yours Truly Johnny Dollar, entitled "The Shankar Diamond Matter", which aired 02/15/1959.

== Film ==
Snowden appears in the movies The Lion Man (1936), The Sun Never Sets (1939), and The Man Who Knew Too Much (1956) (uncredited).

== Television ==
- Leave It to Beaver Season 1 Episode 11 as Clothier, Episode 19 as Salesman
- Alfred Hitchcock Presents (1956) (Season 1 Episode 31: "The Gentleman from America") as Hanson (credited as Eric Snowdon)
