= Zamin Ki Dost =

US-American physician and writer

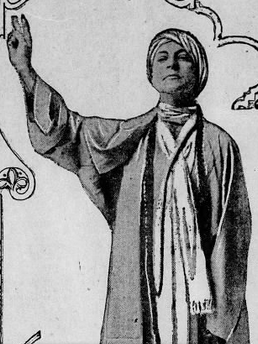
- Willimina Leonora Armstrong, from a 1913 newspaper.
- Born: Willimina Leonora Armstrong; August 14, 1866; Nebraska
- Died: November 2, 1947 (aged 81); Los Angeles, California
- Occupations: physician, writer, lecturer
- Notable work: Incense of Sandalwood (1904); Son of Power (1920, with Will Levington Comfort)
- Relatives: Saleni Armstrong-Hopkins (sister)

Zamin Ki Dost (transl. Friend of the Earth; pen name of Willimina Leonora Armstrong) (August 14, 1866 – November 2, 1947) was an American physician, writer, and lecturer. She is best known for her book Incense of Sandalwood (1904) and stories of India written in collaboration with Will Levington Comfort and published as Son of Power (1920).

== Early life and education ==
Willimina Leonora Armstrong was born in Nebraska in 1866, the daughter of William Leonard Armstrong and Elizabeth Summers Armstrong (1830-1870). Her father was a Union Army surgeon in the American Civil War. She was educated in Philadelphia.

== Career ==
In 1887 she went to India as a medical missionary and served with her older sister, physician Saleni Armstrong-Hopkins. In 1901 she settled in Los Angeles teaching philosophy, and writing stories and poems. In 1904 she published the book Incense of Sandalwood where she gathered her experience of living in India. She wrote eighteen stories of India under the pen name Zamin Ki Dost published in collaboration with Will Levington Comfort as Son of Power. She also composed songs. Armstrong was sued in 1913 for compelling a loan from one of her students with hypnotism.

== Death ==
Willimina Leonora Armstrong died in 1947, and is buried at Glen Haven Memorial Park, Sylmar, California. Her papers are in the UCLA Library, Department of Special Collections.

== Works ==
=== Books ===
- 1904 – Willimina Leonora Armstrong, Incense of the Sandalwood
- 1920 – Will Levington Comfort, Willimina Leonora Armstrong, Son of Power
- 1931 – Will Levington Comfort, Zamin ki Dost, Caroline Renner, Bestien und Heilige
- 1957 – Essential things to know and do, compiled by Noor Zhan

=== Songs ===
- 1908 – Zamin Ki Dost, Have no Fear
- 1908 – Zamin Ki Dost, Armageddon
- 1908 – Zamin Ki Dost, Light of my eyes
- 1908 – Zamin Ki Dost, I hear his voice calling me
- 1908 – Zamin Ki Dost, America invincible; Office for our dead
- 1908 – Zamin Ki Dost, Lullabye
- 1908 – Zamin Ki Dost, A hymn to world peace; Office for our dead
- 1908 – Zamin Ki Dost, The great transmuter
- 1908 – Zamin Ki Dost, Uncle Samuel's men
