= Those Calloways =

1964 film by Norman Tokar

- Theatrical release poster
- Directed by: Norman Tokar
- Screenplay by: Louis Pelletier
- Based on: Swiftwater by Paul Annixter
- Starring: Brian Keith; Vera Miles; Brandon deWilde; Walter Brennan; Ed Wynn; Linda Evans
- Cinematography: Edward Colman
- Edited by: Grant K. Smith
- Music by: Max Steiner
- Production company: Walt Disney Productions
- Distributed by: Buena Vista Distribution
- Release date: November 10, 1964
- Running time: 131 mins.
- Country: United States
- Language: English
- Box office: $3,500,000 (US/ Canada rentals)

Those Calloways is a 1964 American family drama film, adapted from the 1950 children's novel Swiftwater by Paul Annixter. The film was produced by Walt Disney and directed by Norman Tokar. It was the last credit for veteran film composer Max Steiner.

It stars Brian Keith, Vera Miles, Brandon deWilde, Walter Brennan, Ed Wynn and Linda Evans.

The film follows the trials and tribulations of a Vermont family over a period of time as they attempt to establish a sanctuary for the Canada geese that stopover in their rural community during their seasonal migrations.

On-location New England filming contributes to the film's appeal.

Brandon deWilde had previously worked with Walter Brennan in 1956's Good-bye, My Lady and with Brian Keith in the 3-part The Tenderfoot for Walt Disney's Wonderful World of Color in 1964.

== Plot ==
Cam Calloway, a fur trapper of Irish immigration raised by the Micmac Indians, lives on timber land near the backwoods town of Swiftwater, Vermont in the 1920s with his wife Liddy, his 16-year-old son Bucky, his hound Sounder, a black bear cub called Keg, and a pet crow, Scissorbill. Regarded as an eccentric by residents of the town for his lifestyle as a woodsman, Cam's lifelong dream is to establish a sanctuary for the great flocks of wild geese that fly over Swiftwater during their migrations. Cam has inculcated his dedication to the geese in his son, but Liddy is less enthusiastic. Out of love she tolerates his ways and repeatedly forgives his lapses of whiskey drinking. At this time, Bucky starts to fall in love with his childhood sweetheart, 18-year old Bridie Mellott, a local store clerk.

Cam has his sights on making $1100 to buy 30 acres of marshland surrounding Swiftwater Lake, where he will plant a patch of corn to lure the geese into his proposed sanctuary. The final mortgage payment on Cam's own property is also coming due, so with winter approaching he and Bucky seek a virgin area to set out two traplines, hoping for a lucrative season in fox and ermine that will finance Liddy's dreams for a nice home as well as his own. They scout the rough Jackpine Valley, an area never trapped before because it is unknown to the local whites and feared as a place of bad spirits by the Micmacs. Disregarding his own superstitions, Cam forges ahead but falls and breaks his leg.

Bucky and Sounder return to the Jackpine to set out their lines and spend the season working them. When most of the traps are ravaged by a wolverine, Bucky saves the fur season and an injured Sounder by killing the wolverine when it attacks him. Unfortunately the bottom of the fur market has inexplicably fallen out and they realize only a quarter of the profits they have planned for. In his despair, Cam spends nearly all of it as a down payment on buying Swiftwater Lake. As a result, he is unable to pay off the loan on their home and he and his family are evicted. Forced to move to the lake, the Calloways are surprised when many of their neighbors help them build a new home.

Meanwhile, Dell Fraser, a traveling salesman, schemes to convert Swiftwater into a resort for goose hunters. Posing as a conservationist photographer, Dell feigns interest in the project and gives Cam money to plant the corn patch. When the corn comes in, Bucky learns of the deception and Cam confronts the profiteers. Cam drunkenly tries to burn his corn patch to thwart the plan but Liddy saves it. After Cam is seriously wounded by a hunter's shotgun blast, the entire town rallies around him. They organize a petition asking the federal government to buy the marshland for a preserve and keep it out of the hands of the hunters. As Cam recovers from his wound, Fraser and his cohorts leave town, and the dream of those Calloways becomes a reality.

== Cast ==
- Brian Keith as Cam Calloway
- Vera Miles as Liddy Calloway
- Brandon deWilde as Bucky Calloway
- Walter Brennan as Alf Simes
- Ed Wynn as Ed Parker
- Linda Evans as Bridie Mellott
- Philip Abbott as Dell Fraser
- John Larkin as Jim Mellott
- Parley Baer as Doane Shattuck
- Frank de Kova as Nigosh
- Roy Roberts as E.J. Fletcher
- John Qualen as Ernie Evans
- Tom Skerritt as Whit Turner
- Paul Hartman as Charley Evans
- Russell Collins as Nat Perkins
- John Davis Chandler as Ollie Gibbons
- Chet Stratton as Phil Petrie
- Renee Godfrey as Sarah Mellott

== Home media ==
Those Calloways was released through VHS on October 19, 1985. It was later re-released in Region 1 DVD widescreen by Walt Disney Studios Home Entertainment on February 3, 2004.

== See also ==
- List of American films of 1965
