= Apache (novel) =

1931 novel by Will Levington Comfort

- Author: Will Levington Comfort
- Language: English
- Publication date: 1931

Apache is a 1931 novel by Will Levington Comfort based on the true story of Mangas Coloradas, chief of the Eastern Chiricahua Apaches.
