= Hendrik Vollaerts =

American screenwriter

- Born: Henricus Wilhelmus Vollaerts; June 6, 1915; Wouw, Netherlands
- Died: March 15, 1988 (aged 72); Mission Viejo, California, U.S.
- Occupation: Screenwriter
- Spouse: Rosalind Leane

Hendrik Vollaerts, known as Rik Vollaerts, (June 6, 1915 (Note: According to Vollaerts's birth records, immigration record, and naturalization record, he was born on June 6, 1915. However, his obituary states that he was born on December 10, 1918.) – March 15, 1988) was an American screenwriter.

== Early life and education ==
Hendrik Vollaerts was born in Wouw in the Netherlands, the son of Jacobus Cornelis Vollaerts (1893–1924) and Anna Maria Louisa de Rooij (1894–?). His father emigrated to the United States in 1918, and he emigrated to the United States together with his mother in 1921. He applied for American citizenship in 1940. Vollaerts graduated from the University of Chicago.

== Career ==
Vollaerts wrote for Frank Sinatra's radio program. He wrote for television programs including Bonanza, Leave It to Beaver, Rawhide, Voyage to the Bottom of the Sea, The Deputy, Wagon Train, Lawman, Highway Patrol, Death Valley Days and Mannix. He also wrote the episode "For the World Is Hollow and I Have Touched the Sky" of the science fiction television series Star Trek: The Original Series.

Vollaerts worked with screenwriter Maurice Richlin on the sitcom television series My Hero.

Vollaerts died in 1988.

== Family ==
Vollaerts married Rosalind Genevieve Leane (1922–1973) in 1944. They divorced in 1966. He married Patricia Greer in 1967.
