= Norman Tokar =

American film director (1919–1979)

- Born: November 25, 1919
- Died: April 6, 1979 (aged 59); Hollywood, California, U.S.
- Occupation: Film director
- Years active: 1956–1979

Norman Tokar (November 25, 1919 – April 6, 1979) was an American director, actor and occasional writer and producer of serial television and feature films, who directed many of the early episodes of Leave it to Beaver, and found his greatest success directing over a dozen films for Walt Disney Productions, spanning the 1950s to the 1970s.

== Career ==
On Broadway, Tokar acted in Delicate Story (1940), The Life of Reilly (1942), See My Lawyer (1939) and The Magic Touch (1947). After that, Tokar moved into radio, most notably The Aldrich Family, where he played Henry Aldrich's friend Willie and wrote several episodes as well. Tokar then went into television direction on such sitcoms as The Bob Cummings Show and The Donna Reed Show, the drama Naked City, and two episodes of the anthology series Colgate Theatre, and he co-wrote an episode of New Comedy Showcase.

In the early 1960s, Tokar's success working with the juvenile actors on 93 episodes of the TV sitcom Leave it to Beaver encouraged Walt Disney to hire him to direct family features for his studio, which frequently used children in key roles. His first feature film assignment was the Western Big Red (1962), followed by the Old Yeller sequel Savage Sam (1963) and Those Calloways (1965). After directing the Fred MacMurray picture Follow Me, Boys!, and the Dean Jones/Suzanne Pleshette slapstick comedy The Ugly Dachshund (both 1966), Tokar's next directorial assignment (Walt Disney's last before his death) was the roadshow musical The Happiest Millionaire (1967). With a Sherman Brothers score and a cast including Fred MacMurray, Greer Garson, Tommy Steele, Lesley Ann Warren, and John Davidson, the studio hoped the film would do as well with critics and audiences as Mary Poppins (1964) had done. When it failed to do so, the studio cut the nearly three-hour film down to 144 minutes and again to 118 minutes for general release; the cut footage went unseen until it was restored in the 1990s.

Tokar followed Millionaire with more examples of the high-concept comedies that became the mainstay of the studio in the 1960s and 1970s: The Horse in the Gray Flannel Suit (1968), The Boatniks (1970), and Snowball Express (1972). After directing his only non-Disney feature Where the Red Fern Grows (1974), Tokar made his most commercially successful film; the comedy western The Apple Dumpling Gang (1975). Following Candleshoe (1977), on Tokar's final film before his death, The Cat from Outer Space (1978), he gained a co-producer credit.

== Death ==
On April 6, 1979, Tokar died in his sleep at Cedar Sinai in Hollywood, California, following a recent heart attack.

== Filmography ==
Year	Title
1962	Big Red
1963	Savage Sam
1964	A Tiger Walks
1965	Those Calloways
1966	The Ugly Dachshund
1966	Follow Me, Boys!
1967	The Happiest Millionaire
1968	The Horse in the Gray Flannel Suit
1969	Rascal
1970	The Boatniks
1972	Snowball Express
1974	Where the Red Fern Grows
1975	The Apple Dumpling Gang
1976	No Deposit, No Return
1977	Candleshoe
1978	The Cat from Outer Space
