= Martha Bronson =

Aunt Martha
- Madge Kennedy as Aunt Martha.
- First appearance: "Beaver's Short Pants"
- Last appearance: Leave It to Beaver (1997 film adaptation of the television series)
- Created by: Bob Mosher; Joe Connelly
- Portrayed by: Madge Kennedy (television series, 1957-1963); Barbara Billingsley (film adaptation of television series, 1997)

In-universe information
- Gender: Female
- Family: Wilbur Bronson (brother); Theodore Bronson (brother); Unnamed third brother
- Relatives: June Cleaver (niece); Peggy (niece); Wally Cleaver (great-nephew); Beaver Cleaver (great-nephew); Infant great-niece (Peggy's daughter)

Martha Bronson is a fictional recurring character in the American television sitcom Leave It to Beaver. "Aunt Martha," as she is known in the series, appears in five of the show's 234 episodes and is mentioned occasionally but not seen. The character is portrayed by Madge Kennedy.

In the 1997 film adaptation of the series, Leave It to Beaver, Aunt Martha is played by Barbara Billingsley. Billingsley portrayed June Cleaver in the original series.

== Profile ==
Aunt Martha (Bronson) is June Cleaver's spinster aunt. June credits Martha with raising her and says Aunt Martha was practically the only mother she ever knew. June spent summers as a girl with her. Beaver was named for Aunt Martha's brother, Theodore, and, in one episode, Beaver receives her brother's heirloom ring. The boys call Martha their "umbrella aunt" because she once gave them umbrellas on their birthdays. Martha lives within a few hours of Mayfield at Riverside. In one episode, the boys take a train trip to her house, and, in another episode, Beaver visits her for the weekend.

Martha makes her first appearance in the first-season episode, "Beaver's Short Pants" when she steps in to take care of Ward and the boys while June visits an out-of-town sister who has given birth. Martha's "old maid" mindset and way of doing things irks the rugged Cleaver males. Martha prepares milk toast for breakfast, for example, and eggplant for dinner. She insists on buying Beaver a short pants suit for school. However, as Beaver is leaving for school, Ward calls him into the garage and gives Beaver a set of "regular" clothes to wear. In relief and gratitude, Beaver gives his father a quick kiss on the cheek. In this episode, Aunt Martha was picked up at the airport so presumably she lived further away than Riverside.

In another episode, Martha and her friend, Mrs. Hathaway, visit the Cleavers on short notice. The boys are forced to cancel plans to attend a carnival with their pals. In her final appearance, Martha presses her wish that Beaver attend a hoity toity prep school (Fallbrook, a school attended by four generations of Bronsons) on the east coast. Although Beaver gives the idea some consideration, he finally tells Martha he would rather attend Mayfield High with the friends he has known for years.

In another inconsistency, Aunt Martha is sometimes referred to as living in Bellport.

In The New Leave It To Beaver Aunt Martha appears in 2 episodes. She is played by Irene Tedrow.

In a previous series, Professional Father, in which Billingsley played the wife of a child psychologist (Stephen Dunne), there was also an "Aunt Martha", the aunt of Billingsley's character.

== Episodes ==
- "Beaver's Short Pants" (1957): Aunt Martha buys Beaver a short pants suit for school.
- "Train Trip" (1958): Aunt Martha sees the boys off when they return home after paying her a visit.
- "The Visiting Aunts" (1958): Aunt Martha drops by, forcing the boys to cancel plans to attend a carnival.
- "Beaver the Magician" (1959): Beaver visits his aunt after pretending to be turned into a rock.
- "Beaver's Prep School" (1963): Aunt Martha wants Beaver to attend a prep school on the east coast.
