= It's a Small World (Leave It to Beaver) =

- Leave It to Beaver episode
- Mathers and Sullivan
- Directed by: Jerry Hopper
- Written by: Joe Connelly; Bob Mosher
- Original air date: April 23, 1957

Guest appearances
- Diane Brewster; Richard Deacon; Joseph Kearns; Harry Shearer

Episode chronology
← Previous —	Next → "Beaver Gets 'Spelled"

Billingsley and Adams

"It's a Small World" is the pilot episode from the American television series Leave It to Beaver (1957–1963). The pilot (originally proposed as Wally and The Beaver) was first televised April 23, 1957, on the syndicated anthology series, Studio 57, without a laugh track nor the series' well known theme song, "The Toy Parade". It never aired as an episode within the series. Following its April 1957 telecast, the episode was subsequently misplaced and was feared lost until a copy was found in a film vault in Illinois. After rediscovery, it was aired as the third-season premiere for the 1980s TBS revival series The New Leave It to Beaver on October 4, 1987, exactly 30 years after the original series officially premiered on CBS. It was televised again in October 2007 as part of TV Land's 50th anniversary celebration of Leave It to Beaver. It was released to DVD in 2005. The series made its CBS debut several months later on October 4, 1957, with the episode, "Beaver Gets 'Spelled".

== Plot ==
Wally and Beaver want a new bicycle. Frankie Bennett, a mischievous boy, tells them new bikes can be had at a local dairy in exchange for 1,000 bottle caps from the company's products. The boys collect the bottle caps, but, in attempting to redeem them, learn they've been duped. Ward takes pity on the boys and buys them a bicycle.

== Characters and cast ==
- June Cleaver (Barbara Billingsley) is married to Ward Cleaver and the mother of Wally and Beaver.
- Ward Cleaver (Casey Adams) is married to June Cleaver and the father of Wally and Beaver.
- Wally Cleaver (Paul Sullivan) is the older son of Ward and June and the brother of Beaver.
- Theodore "Beaver" Cleaver (Jerry Mathers) is the younger son of Ward and June and the brother of Wally.
- Miss Simms (Diane Brewster) is a secretary/receptionist at the Franklin Milk Company.
- Mr. Baxter (Richard Deacon) is an executive at the Franklin Milk Company and Miss Simms' boss.
- Mr. Crowley (Joseph Kearns) is the CEO of the Franklin Milk Company.
- Frankie Bennett (Harry Shearer) is a mischievous boy and an acquaintance of Wally and Beaver.

== Production ==
"It's a Small World" was filmed with a single camera, in full screen black-and-white at Republic Studios and the Universal Studios backlot. Joe Connelly and Bob Mosher wrote the teleplay with Jerry Hopper directing the episode. Richard Lewis produced the episode.

A number of actors who appeared in supporting roles in the pilot were later cast in recurring roles in the series. Diane Brewster appears as Miss Simms, a secretary, with Richard Deacon as Mr. Baxter, Miss Simms' boss. Brewster and Deacon would find roles in the series as Miss Canfield, Beaver's second grade teacher, and Fred Rutherford, Ward's co-worker and father of "Lumpy," Eddie Haskell's easily duped henchman/bully. Other cast members include Russ Thorson as Man with Milk Bottles, Leonard Bremen as Milk Bar Operator, Tim Graham as Doc, and Virginia Carroll as Nurse.

After the series was picked up by CBS, Hugh Beaumont replaced Casey Adams as Ward Cleaver while the role of Wally went to Tony Dow after Sullivan experienced a growth spurt before the series' production. The character of Frankie Bennett became Eddie Haskell, portrayed by Ken Osmond, after Harry Shearer’s parents decided for Shearer not to continue.

== Sources ==
- Applebaum, Irwyn. The World According to Beaver. TV Books, 1984, 1998. (ISBN 1575000520).
- Bank, Frank. Call Me Lumpy: my Leave It To Beaver days and other wild Hollywood life . Addax, 2002. (ISBN 1886110298), (ISBN 978-1886110298).
- Leave It to Beaver: the complete first season. Universal Studios, 2005.
- Leave It to Beaver: the complete second season. Universal Studios, 2006. (ISBN 1417074876)
- Mathers, Jerry. ...And Jerry Mathers as "The Beaver". Berkley Boulevard Books, 1998. (ISBN 0425163709)
