= Judy Hensler =

- Jeri Weil as Judy Hensler
- First appearance: "Beaver Gets 'Spelled" (October 4, 1957)
- Created by: Bob Mosher; Joe Connelly
- Portrayed by: Jeri Weil

In-universe information
- Gender: Female

Judy Hensler is a fictional character in the American television sitcom Leave It to Beaver. The show aired from October 4, 1957, to June 20, 1963. Judy is a recurring character portrayed by Jeri Weil. She appeared in 31 of the show's 234 episodes, between October 1957 and October 1960.

== Profile ==
As a classmate of the series' hero, "Beaver" Cleaver, Judy Hensler made her first appearance in the premiere episode, "Beaver Gets 'Spelled", as a student in Miss Canfield's second grade class.

She was a classic goody-goody who snitches on her classmates, notably Beaver. In one episode, she believed Beaver was Miss Canfield's pet and urged him to prove her wrong by putting a spring-action snake in the teacher's desk drawer. Beaver did — and regretted it.

In another episode, Beaver begged his parents to buy him a sweater in a shop window. When they bought the sweater and Beaver wore it to school, only to discover Judy had the same sweater, Beaver believed he'd bought a girl's sweater and hid it behind a candy machine at the movie theater, only to face discipline at home.

On the series, Judy appeared rarely outside the classroom. She tried to curry favor with her teachers, but they were aware of her deviousness — and kept her in check. Judy's parents were seen briefly in an episode about Beaver's selection to perform in a school play as a canary.

Judy's final appearance was in the episode, "Beaver Becomes a Hero" (October 1960). The character was eventually dropped and replaced by Penny Woods, who became Beaver's new nemesis. However unlike Judy, Penny became his frenemy and constant love-hate interest.
