= Ward Cleaver =

Fictional character in an American television series

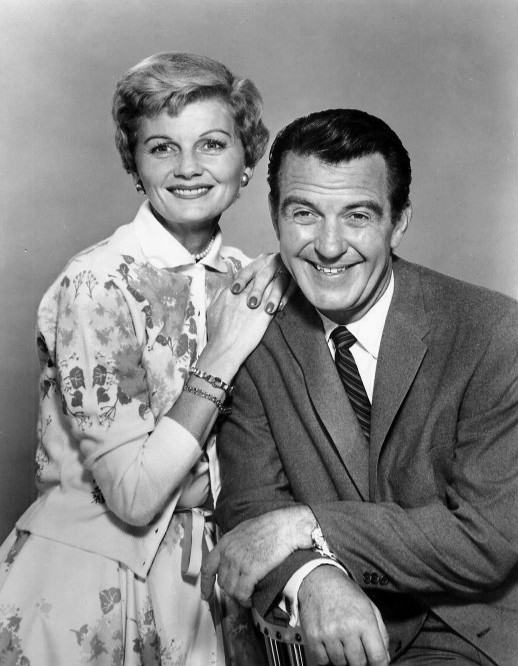
- Barbara Billingsley and Hugh Beaumont as June and Ward Cleaver
- First appearance: "It's a Small World" (pilot episode) (April 23, 1957)
- Last appearance: Leave It to Beaver (1997 film adaptation)
- Created by: Joe Connelly; Bob Mosher
- Portrayed by: Max Showalter (pilot); Hugh Beaumont (series proper); Christopher McDonald (film adaptation)

In-universe information
- Gender: Male
- Occupation: White collar
- Family: Ward Cleaver Sr (father); Tom Cleaver (brother); Unnamed brother; Unnamed sister
- Spouse: June Bronson
- Children: Wallace "Wally" Cleaver; Theodore "Beaver" Cleaver
- Relatives: Billy Cleaver (uncle); Frank (uncle); Kip Cleaver (grandson); Oliver Cleaver (grandson); Kelly Cleaver (granddaughter); Kevin Cleaver (grandson)

Ward Cleaver Jr. is a fictional character in the American television sitcom Leave It to Beaver. Ward and his wife, June, are often invoked as archetypal suburban parents of the 1950s baby boomers. At the start of the show, the couple are the parents of Wally, a thirteen-year-old in the seventh grade, and seven-year-old ("almost eight") second-grader Theodore, nicknamed "The Beaver". A typical episode from Leave It to Beaver follows a misadventure committed by one or both of the boys, and ends with the culprits receiving a moral lecture from their father and a hot meal from their mother.

Hugh Beaumont portrays Ward in the series and directed several episodes in the later seasons of the show. Max Showalter (appearing as Casey Adams) plays Ward in the series' pilot, "It's a Small World", which aired in April 1957. Many of the Leave It to Beaver players were featured in their original roles in a reunion movie televised in 1983 (Still the Beaver) and a sequel series called The New Leave It to Beaver that aired from 1985 to 1989. Hugh Beaumont had died in 1982, and in the 1983 reunion movie, the character of Ward Cleaver was portrayed as having died in 1977, at the age of 67. Christopher McDonald plays Ward in the 1997 reboot film adaptation Leave It to Beaver.

Ward's principal dramatic function in the series is to end each episode with moral instruction for one or both of his errant sons. Ward's relationships with his wife and his co-worker Fred Rutherford are asides that flesh out his character.

== Background ==
Ward is a farmer's son and hails from Shaker Heights, an actual location near Cleveland, Ohio, which also has a suburb called Mayfield. Ward attended a preparatory school, is a veteran of World War II (having served as a surveyor in the Seabees), a state college graduate (majoring in philosophy), and member of a fraternity (Alpha Kappa), a responsible white-collar professional, and an upstanding citizen. Ward met his future wife, June Evelyn Bronson, when they were teens. The two dated and went to state college together. They married and became the parents of two sons, Wally and Theodore (the Beaver).

== Home life ==
June and Ward Cleaver (Barbara Billingsley and Hugh Beaumont)

Ward has few interests at home, other than monitoring his sons and spending evenings after dinner sitting next to his wife on the couch in the living room reading Mayfield's daily newspaper, the Mayfield Press (although other titles have been seen), and enjoying coffee. Ward is occasionally seen suppressing his smirks by sipping from his cup.

On the odd occasion, the two step out to a wedding reception, a school play, or a restaurant together. In one episode, Ward and June have the Rutherfords in for an evening of cards. Occasionally, as shown in the episode titled "Wally's Dinner Date", they play on their own. In other episodes, Ward manages the grill on the patio for dining al fresco with guests. Among the cars Ward drives are a 1957 Ford Fairlane in the first season, and 1959, 1960, 1961, 1962, and 1963 Plymouth Furys in subsequent seasons, all of them four-door sedans or hardtops. Although a 1962 model is used in the opening credits through the last season, a 1963 model can be seen in the driveway on at least one episode. Ward plays golf at a local country club, and attends church. Ward sometimes drives the family to nearby Crystal Falls or Friends Lake.

Wally and Beaver Cleaver (Tony Dow and Jerry Mathers)

Ward played basketball in school and, in one episode, tries to give his sons and their friends a few tips on the game; however, he dominates the session with his nit-picking and the boys run off to play without his interference. He is handy with tools and does a few minor repairs around the house such as fixing squeaky doors and repairing or replacing electrical appliance cord plugs because June pulls them out of the electrical outlet by the wire instead of the plug. He occasionally dries the dishes for his wife, as well.

Though neither Ward or June smoke, he is shown refilling cigarette lighters in season three. He has a meerschaum pipe (the gift of Fred Rutherford), which Beaver and Larry fill with coffee grounds and smoke. He chews gum in one episode. Ward also has a bottle of brandy in the dining room credenza that Beaver gives to an alcoholic handyman and then to a tramp.

The man of the house has a home office/den in the Pine Street dwelling of the last four seasons. He uses the room to discipline the boys, make phone calls, and balance his checkbook. A large globe stands on the floor before a window, but is replaced in later episodes by a television set that is usually turned off. Though one wall is lined with books, rarely do the Cleavers read anything other than newspapers or magazines. Occasionally, a book is pulled from the shelves for Wally’s and Beaver's school assignments.

Ward masterfully handles 'outdoor cooking' (Beaver's description of Ward's barbecuing while on their backyard patio), but is usually portrayed as inept while 'indoor cooking' in the family kitchen.

== Work life ==
Ward is an archetypical white-collar, briefcase-toting professional of the 1950s. He wears a business suit, works in an office with a view of a metropolitan area, has a secretary named Grace, and leaves home early in the morning and returns in the early evening. He works for a "big company" with main offices in New York City. He drives to work in his Plymouth unless June needs the car during the day for an errand. He is home on weekends for golfing at a local country club. Occasionally, Ward is required to do some office work at home. In one early episode, for example, he works at home on a women's marketing survey. His co-worker and friend is Fred Rutherford, a smug, pompous man who refers to the workplace as "the salt mine".

== Relatives ==
Ward has a bachelor uncle named Billy who was a world traveler, played in the series by Edgar Buchanan. June finds Billy somewhat untrustworthy, as he tends to fill the boys' heads with thoughts of irresponsible behavior and lifestyles. June sometimes places Ward in a position where he is forced to "explain" or apologize for his Uncle Billy. No other relatives of Ward's appear on the show. Ward mentions his parents (usually his father, a strict disciplinarian who believed in corporal punishment) when recalling incidents from his boyhood. Ward had a brother, Tom Cleaver, and as boys, they entered a hog in a 4-H competition. In one episode, Ward also mentioned having a sister. In the episode “Ward’s Baseball,” Ward has a display pedestal made for an old autographed baseball given to him by his Uncle Frank. In the same episode, we learn that Ward has both an older and a younger brother. Ward's grandfather was a hero of the American Civil War.
