= Miss Canfield =

Fictional character in the American television sitcom Leave It to Beaver

- Diane Brewster as Miss Canfield.
- First appearance: "Beaver Gets 'Spelled"
- Last appearance: "Beaver and Poncho"
- Created by: Bob Mosher; Joe Connelly
- Portrayed by: Diane Brewster

In-universe information
- Gender: Female
- Occupation: Schoolteacher

Miss Canfield is a fictional character in the American television sitcom Leave It to Beaver. She is portrayed by Diane Brewster.

The character appeared in four first-season episodes. Brewster then left the series without explanation. Sue Randall stepped in to play Beaver's teacher, Alice Landers, over the following seasons. In "Beaver’s Pigeons" (1959) the two pigeons are named Miss Canfield and Miss Landers.

Miss Canfield's portrayer, Diane Brewster, also appeared in the show's pilot "It's a Small World" as Miss Simms, a secretary at the Franklin Milk Company.

== Overview ==
Miss Canfield is a young and attractive, no-nonsense schoolteacher who is leading a second grade class for the first time at Grant Avenue Grammar School when the show debuts in 1957. She has a good relationship with her students and her colleague, Mrs. Rayburn.

In the premiere episode, Miss Canfield sends a note home with Beaver, who believes he is going to be expelled. Beaver is relieved when he discovers that the note contains only a request to have him play Smokey Bear in a school pageant. In another episode, Beaver develops a crush on Miss Canfield, and, at the urging of his classmates, puts a spring snake in her desk to prove he's not a teacher's pet. In "Part-Time Genius", Miss Canfield tells the Cleavers that Beaver's IQ test results indicate he's a genius. It proves to be a false alarm, however. In her last appearance, Miss Canfield discovers a dog hidden inside Beaver's jacket.

Miss Canfield was a warm and attractive character, a patient and understanding teacher. Her first name is never revealed on the show.

== Episodes ==
- "Beaver Gets 'Spelled'" (1957, as Diana Brewster)
- "Beaver's Crush" (1957)
- "Part-Time Genius" (1958)
- "Beaver and Poncho" (1958)
