= Barbara Billingsley =

American actress (1915–2010)

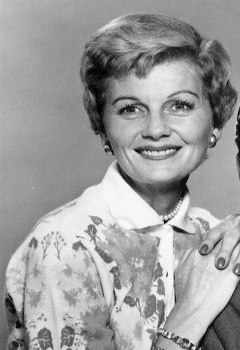
- Billingsley in 1958
- Born: Barbara Lillian Combes; December 22, 1915; Los Angeles, California, U.S.
- Died: October 16, 2010 (aged 94); Santa Monica, California, U.S.
- Resting place: Woodlawn Memorial Cemetery
- Education: Los Angeles Junior College
- Occupation: Actress
- Years active: 1945–2007
- Spouses: Glenn Billingsley (m. 1941; div. 1947) Roy Kellino (m. 1953; died 1956) William Mortensen (m. 1959; died 1981)
- Children: 2

Barbara Billingsley (December 22, 1915 – October 16, 2010) was an American actress. She began her career in Shadow on the Wall (1950), and with uncredited roles in Three Guys Named Mike (1951), The Bad and the Beautiful (1952), and Invaders from Mars (1953) and was featured in the 1957 film The Careless Years opposite Natalie Trundy. She then appeared in recurring television roles, such as The Brothers.

Billingsley gained prominence for her best-known role of June Cleaver, the mother in the television series Leave It to Beaver (1957–1963) and its sequel The New Leave It to Beaver (1983–1989). She appeared as the "Jive Lady" in Airplane! (1980) and her final film role was as Aunt Martha in the 1997 film version of Leave It to Beaver.

== Early life ==
Billingsley was born Barbara Lillian Combes on December 22, 1915, in Los Angeles, California, the daughter of Lillian Agnes (née McLaughlin) and Robert Collyer Combes, a police officer. She had one elder sibling, Elizabeth. Her parents divorced before her fourth birthday and her father went on to remarry and become an assistant chief of police. After the divorce, Billingsley's mother began working as a forewoman at a knitting mill.

== Career ==
=== Early years ===
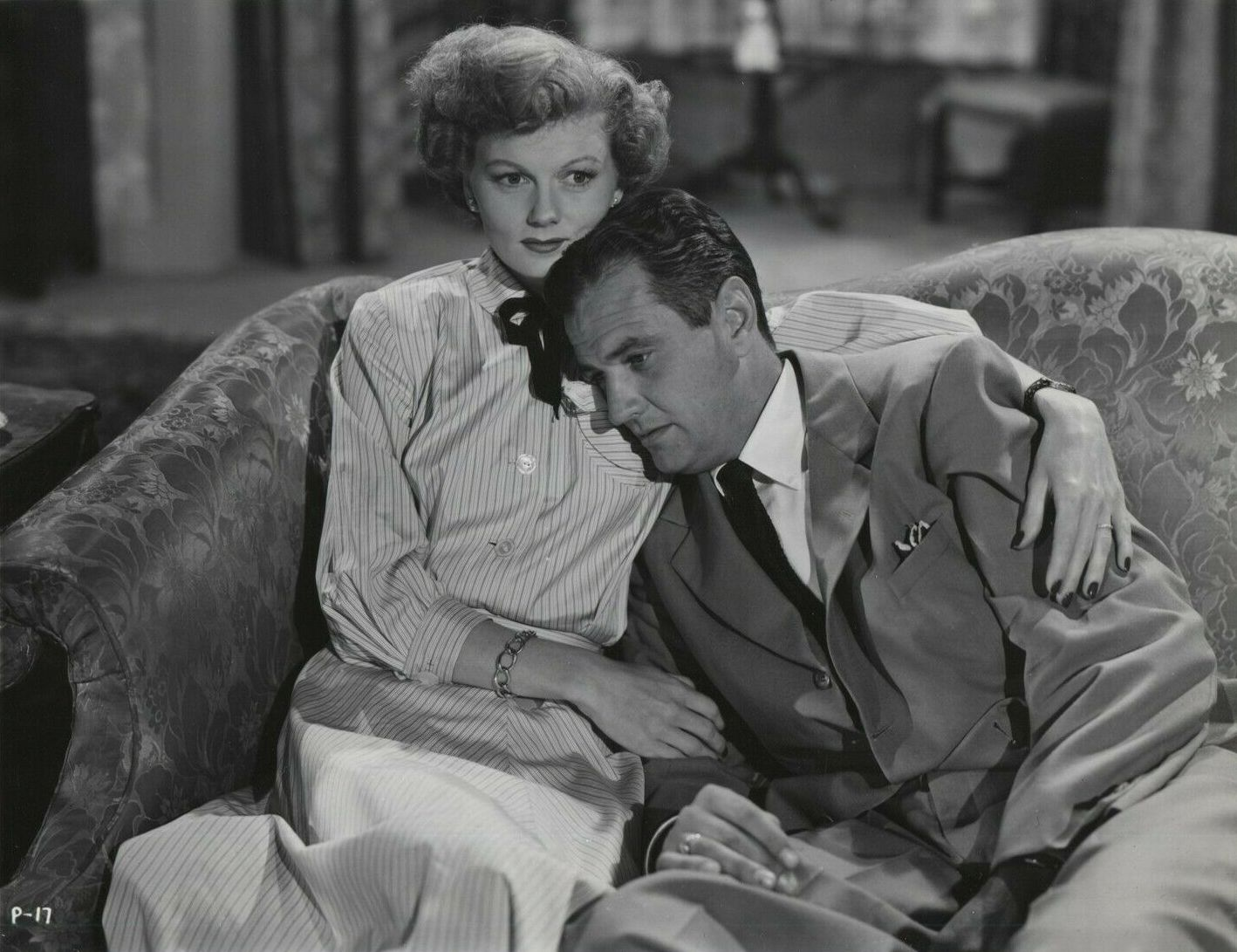
Billingsley and Bruce Edwards play a Jewish couple in Prejudice (1949).

After attending Los Angeles Junior College for one year, Billingsley traveled to Broadway, when Straw Hat, a revue in which she was appearing, attracted enough attention to send it to New York City. When the show closed after five days, she took an apartment on 57th Street and went to work as a $60-a-week fashion model. In 1941, she married Glenn Billingsley Sr. She landed a contract with MGM Studios in 1945, and moved with her husband to Los Angeles in 1946. That same year, Glenn Billingsley opened a steakhouse there.

She had mostly uncredited roles in major movies in the 1940s. These roles continued into the first half of the 1950s with supporting roles in Three Guys Named Mike (1951), opposite Jane Wyman; The Bad and the Beautiful (1952); and the science-fiction film Invaders from Mars (1953). In 1952, Billingsley had her first role as a guest star in an episode of The Abbott and Costello Show.

In 1955, she won a costarring role in the sitcom Professional Father, starring Stephen Dunne and Beverly Washburn. It lasted one season. The next year, Billingsley had a recurring role in The Brothers (with Gale Gordon and Bob Sweeney) and an appearance with David Niven in his anthology series Four Star Playhouse. In 1957, she costarred with Dean Stockwell and Natalie Trundy in The Careless Years, her first and only major role in a film.

Billingsley had guest roles in The Pride of the Family, Schlitz Playhouse of Stars, Letter to Loretta, You Are There, and Cavalcade of America. She appeared on Make Room for Daddy on January 14, 1957, in the episode "Danny's Date", where she played Mary Rogers.

=== Leave It to Beaver ===
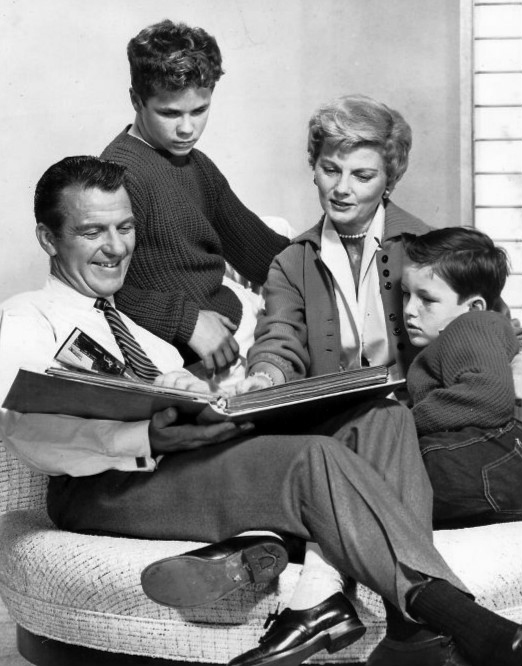
Cast of Leave It to Beaver

Billingsley appeared on TV as June Cleaver in the sitcom Leave It to Beaver. It debuted on CBS in 1957 to mediocre ratings. It was picked up by ABC the following year and became a hit, airing for the next five seasons, and broadcast in over 100 countries. It also starred Hugh Beaumont as Ward Cleaver, June's husband and the kids' father, and child actors Tony Dow as Wally Cleaver and Jerry Mathers as Theodore "Beaver" Cleaver.

In the show, Billingsley was often seen doing household chores wearing pearls and earrings. The pearls, which were Billingsley's trademark, were, in turn, her idea to have her alter ego wear on television. She had what she termed "a hollow" in her neck and thought that wearing a strand of white pearls would lighten it up for the cameras. In later seasons, she started wearing high heels to compensate for the fact that the actors playing her sons were getting taller than she was. The pearl necklace was so closely associated with the character that an entire episode of the sequel series dealt with the necklace when it was lost.

Billingsley had one regret about the show's lasting success: In standard actors' contracts in the 1950s, residual payments ended after six re-runs and the show, subsequently considered a classic, was syndicated for the rest of her life.

Billingsley said that her character was the "ideal mother" during a 1997 interview with TV Guide. She said that some people thought June was a weak character, but that she didn't: "She was the love in that family. She set a good example for what a wife could be. I had two boys at home when I did the show. I think the character became kind of like me and vice versa. I've never known where one started and where one stopped." Billingsley explained her view on the enduring appeal of the Leave It to Beaver characters: "I think everybody would like a family like that. Wouldn't it be nice if you came home from school and there was Mom standing there with her little apron and cookies waiting?"

Billingsley, however, questioned her character's reactions to the Cleaver children's misbehavior, basing her concern on personal experience as the mother of two sons. As co-producer Joseph Connelly explained: "In scenes where she's mad at the boys, she's always coming over to us with the script and objecting. 'I don't see why June is so mad over what Beaver's done. I certainly wouldn't be.' As a result, many of Beaver's crimes have been rewritten into something really heinous like lying about them, in order to give his mother a strong motive for blowing her lady-like stack."

After six seasons and 234 episodes, the series was canceled because of the cast's desire to move on to other projects, especially Mathers, who retired from acting to enter his freshman year in high school. The younger actor considered Billingsley a mentor, a second mother and a close professional friend:

Barbara was always, though, a true role model for me. She was a great actress. And a lot of people, you know, when they see her talk jive talk, they always say she can do other things besides be a mom on Leave It to Beaver. And I tell them Airplane! (1980); she's been a great comedienne all her life. And in a lot of ways, just like All in the Family, we kind of stifled her because her true talent didn't really come out in Leave It to Beaver. She was the straight woman, but she has an awful lot of talent.

=== After Beaver ===
When production of the show ended in 1963, Billingsley had become typecast and had trouble obtaining acting jobs for years. She traveled extensively abroad until the late 1970s. After an absence of 17 years from the public eye (other than appearing in two episodes of The F.B.I. in 1971), she spoofed her wholesome image with a brief appearance in the comedy Airplane! (1980) as a passenger who could "speak jive." She said the role gave her as much publicity as Beaver and revived her career.

Returning to television, she appeared on episodes of Mork & Mindy and The Love Boat. In 1983, she reprised her role as June Cleaver in the Leave It to Beaver television movie titled Still the Beaver in 1983. Hugh Beaumont had died the previous year of a heart attack, so she played his widow. She also appeared in the revival of the series The New Leave It to Beaver from 1984 to 1989. During the run of The New Leave It to Beaver, Billingsley became the voice of Nanny on Muppet Babies from 1984 to 1991. For her performance as Nanny, she received Daytime Emmy Award nominations for Outstanding Performer in a Children’s Series in 1989 and 1990.

After The New Leave It to Beaver ended its run in 1989, Billingsley appeared in guest roles on Parker Lewis Can't Lose, Empty Nest, and Murphy Brown. She also reprised her role as June Cleaver in various television shows, including Elvira's Movie Macabre, Amazing Stories, Baby Boom, Hi Honey, I'm Home!, and Roseanne. In 1998, she appeared on Candid Camera, with June Lockhart and Isabel Sanford, as audience members in a spoof seminar on motherhood. Billingsley's final film role was as Aunt Martha in the 1997 film version of Leave It to Beaver. She made her final onscreen appearance in the 2003 television movie Secret Santa.

After the show's cancellation in 1963, Mathers remained her close friend. They were reunited on The New Leave It to Beaver. Billingsley, Mathers, Dow, Frank Bank, and Ken Osmond celebrated the show's 50th anniversary together on Good Morning America.

== Personal life ==
Billingsley was married three times and had two children. In 1941, she married Glenn Billingsley Sr., a restaurateur and a nephew of Sherman Billingsley, owner of the Stork Club. His businesses included Billingsley's Golden Bull, Billingsley's Bocage, the Outrigger Polynesian restaurants in Los Angeles, and a Stork Club in Key West, Florida, where they lived briefly after their wedding. They had two sons and divorced in 1947.

In 1953, she married British-born movie director Roy Kellino. Kellino died of a heart attack in 1956. It was about six months later that she was handed the pilot for what would become Leave It to Beaver (then titled It's a Small World). Billingsley's third and final marriage was to William S. Mortensen in 1959; they remained together until his death in 1981.

=== Death ===
Billingsley died of polymyalgia rheumatica at her home in Santa Monica, California, on October 16, 2010, at age 94. She is interred at Woodlawn Memorial Cemetery, Santa Monica.

== Filmography ==
Year	Title	Role	Notes
1945	So You Think You're Allergic	Blonde with Hives	Short subject Uncredited
1945	Adventure	Dame #2	Uncredited
1946	Up Goes Maisie	Barb's Friend at Maisie's Engagement Party	Uncredited
1946	Two Sisters from Boston	Party Guest	Uncredited
1946	Faithful in My Fashion	Mary – Department Store Clerk	Uncredited
1946	Three Wise Fools	Sister Mary Leonard	Uncredited
1946	Undercurrent	Party Guest	Uncredited
1946	The Secret Heart	Saleswoman	Uncredited
1947	The Arnelo Affair	Weil	Uncredited
1947	The Sea of Grass	Bridesmaid	Uncredited
1947	Living in a Big Way	G.I. Bill's Wife	Uncredited
1947	The Romance of Rosy Ridge	Wife	Uncredited
1947	The Unfinished Dance	Miss Morgan	Uncredited
1948	The Argyle Secrets	Elizabeth Court	
1948	Souvenirs of Death	Johnny's Mom	Short subject Uncredited
1948	The Saxon Charm	Mrs. Maddox	Uncredited
1948	The Valiant Hombre	Linda Mason	
1948	Act of Violence	Voice role	Uncredited
1949	The Sun Comes Up	Nurse	Uncredited
1949	Caught	Store Customer in Flowered Hat	Uncredited
1949	I Cheated the Law	Ruth Campbell	
1949	Any Number Can Play	Gambler	Uncredited
1949	Air Hostess	Madeline Moore	
1949	Prejudice	Doris Green	
1949	A Kiss for Corliss	Miss Hibbs, Harry's Secretary	Uncredited
1950	Shadow on the Wall	Olga	
1950	Trial Without Jury	Rheta Mulford	
1950	Pretty Baby	Edna the Receptionist	
1950	Dial 1119	Dorothy, Editor's Secretary	Uncredited
1951	Three Guys Named Mike	Ann White	
1951	Inside Straight	Miss Meadson	
1951	Oh! Susanna	Mrs. Lark	Uncredited
1951	The Tall Target	Young Mother	Uncredited
1951	Angels in the Outfield	Hat Check Girl in Restaurant	Uncredited
1951	Two-Dollar Bettor	Miss Pierson	Credited as Barbara Billinsley
1952	Invitation	Miss Alvy – Simon's Secretary	Uncredited
1952	Young Man with Ideas	Aggie – Party Guest	Uncredited
1952	Woman in the Dark	Evelyn Courtney	
1952	The Bad and the Beautiful	Evelyn Lucien, Costume Designer	Uncredited
1953	The Lady Wants Mink	Phyllis	Uncredited
1953	Invaders from Mars	Kelston's Secretary	Uncredited
1954	Day of Triumph	Claudia – Wife of Pilate	Uncredited
1957	The Careless Years	Helen Meredith	
1980	Airplane!	Jive Lady	Alternative title: Flying High!
1987	Back to the Beach	Announcer	
1988	Going to the Chapel	Aunt Claire	
1997	Leave It to Beaver	Aunt Martha	

== Television appearances ==
Year	Title	Role	Notes
1952	Rebound	Pat	2 episodes
1953	The Abbott and Costello Show	Becky the Cashier	Episode: "Television"
1953	Crown Theatre with Gloria Swanson		Episode: "Half the Action"
1953	The Pepsi-Cola Playhouse		Segment: "When a Lovely Woman"
1953–1954	City Detective	Lita; Barbara Fuller	2 episodes
1953–1955	Four Star Playhouse	Various roles	3 episodes
1953–1955	Schlitz Playhouse of Stars	Various roles	6 episodes
1953–1957	Cavalcade of America	Dorothea Meadows; Harriet Kohler	2 episodes
1957	The Danny Thomas Show	Mary Rodgers	1 Episode
1954	The Pride of the Family		Episode: "Albie's Old Flame"
1954	The Lone Wolf	Jean Arnold	Episode: "The Long Beach Story (a.k.a. The Smuggling Story)"
1954	Fireside Theater		Episode: "The Whole Truth"
1955	Professional Father	Helen Wilson	18 episodes
1955	You Are There	Catherine Green	Episode: "Eli Whitney Invents the Cotton Gin (May 27, 1793)"
1956	Matinee Theater		Episode: "Summer Cannot Last"
1956	The Loretta Young Show	Connie	Episode: "Tightwad Millionaire"
1956	General Electric Summer Originals		Episode: "Jungle Trap"
1956	The Ford Television Theatre	Mrs. Sloan	Episode: "Catch at Straws"
1956–1957	The Brothers	Barbara	5 episodes
1957	Panic!	Mrs. Mason	Episode: "The Subway"
1957	Mr. Adams and Eve	Liz Blake	Episode: "That Magazine"
1957	Studio 57	June Cleaver	Episode: "It's a Small World"
1957–1963	Leave It to Beaver	June Cleaver	234 episodes
1971	The F.B.I.	Joan Connor; Mrs. Rankin	2 episodes
1982	Mork & Mindy	Louise Bailey	Episode: "Cheerleader in Chains"
1983	Still the Beaver	June Cleaver	Television movie
1983	High School U.S.A.	Mrs. McCarthy	Television movie
1983	Match Game-Hollywood Squares Hour	Herself	Game Show Participant / Celebrity Guest Star
1983, 1987	The Love Boat	Phyllis Cowens (1983); June Cleaver (1987)	2 episodes: "He Ain't Heavy" (1983) "Who Killed Maxwell Thorn?" (1987)
1983–1989	The New Leave It to Beaver	June Cleaver	101 episodes
1984	Elvira's Movie Macabre	June Cleaver	Episode: "The Human Duplicators"
1984	Silver Spoons	Miss Bugden	Episode: "I Won't Dance"
1984–1991	Muppet Babies	Nanny (Voice)	107 episodes
1985	Amazing Stories	June Cleaver	Episode: "Remote Control Man"
1987	The New Mike Hammer	Sister Superior Paula	Episode: "Who Killed Sister Lorna?"
1987	Bay Cove	Beatrice Gower	Television movie
1988	Baby Boom	June Cleaver	Episode: "Guilt"
1989	Monsters		Episode: "Reaper"
1991	Parker Lewis Can't Lose	Ms. Musso's Mother	Episode: "Jerry: Portrait of a Video Junkie"
1991	Hi Honey, I'm Home!	June Cleaver	Episode: "Make My Bed"
1991	Empty Nest	Winifred McConnell	Episode: "My Nurse Is Back and There's Gonna Be Trouble..."
1993–1994	The Mommies	Caryl's mother Jeanne – Marilyn's Mom	2 episodes
1994	Murphy Brown	Mrs. Stritch	Episode: "Crime Story"
1995	Roseanne	Herself – June Cleaver, TV Mom #1	Episode: "All About Rosey Part 2"
2000	Mysterious Ways	Abby Westmore	Episode: "Handshake"
2003	Secret Santa	Miss Ruthie	Television movie
