= Tony Dow =

American actor (1945–2022)

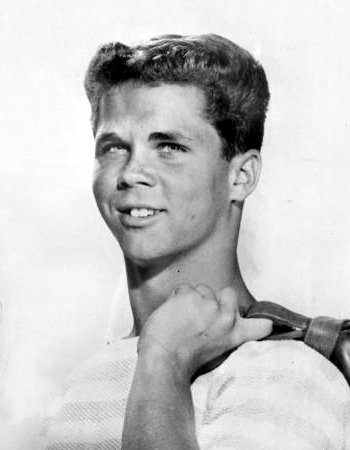
- Dow in 1961
- Born: Anthony Lee Dow; April 13, 1945; Los Angeles, California, U.S.
- Died: July 27, 2022 (aged 77); Topanga, California, U.S.
- Occupations: Actor; director; producer; sculptor
- Years active: 1949–2022
- Spouses: Carol Marlow (m. 1969; div. 1980) Lauren Shulkind (m. 1980)
- Children: 1

Anthony Lee Dow (April 13, 1945 – July 27, 2022) was an American actor. He portrayed Wally Cleaver in the iconic television sitcom Leave It to Beaver from 1957 to 1963. From 1983 to 1989, Dow reprised his role as Wally in a television movie and in The New Leave It to Beaver.

== Early life ==
Dow was born in the Hollywood neighborhood of Los Angeles, California, the son of Muriel Virginia (Montrose), a stuntwoman in westerns, and John Stevens Dow, a designer and contractor. In his youth, he trained as a swimmer and was a Junior Olympics diving champion.

== Screen career ==
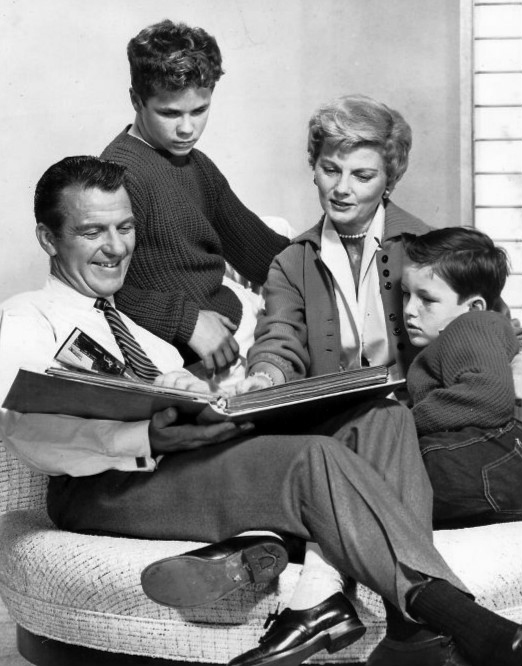
Dow (top) with his Leave It to Beaver co-stars (L–R): Hugh Beaumont, Barbara Billingsley and Jerry Mathers, circa 1959

With a little stage acting and two television pilots as his only acting experience, Dow's career began when he went on an open casting call and landed the role of Wally Cleaver in Leave It to Beaver. With the exception of the television pilot, from 1957 to 1963 he played the older son of June (played by Barbara Billingsley) and Ward (played by Hugh Beaumont) Cleaver, and the older brother of protagonist Theodore "Beaver" Cleaver (played by Jerry Mathers). As played by Dow, Wally was the "all-American" boy—an intelligent, polite teenager, trusted by his parents, popular with his peers, and liked by his teachers. (Wally was based on the series writer Joe Connelly's son, Jay.) In the show's later years, Dow grew into an attractive, athletic young man and was often featured in "heartthrob"-type magazines aimed principally at teen girls. Producers took advantage of Dow's popularity and scripted episodes delving into Wally's dating life, his after-school jobs, his friends, and his car.

After Leave it to Beaver, Dow appeared on other television shows, including My Three Sons, Dr. Kildare, The Greatest Show on Earth, Never Too Young, and on five episodes of Mr. Novak in three different roles. He guest-starred on the television series Adam-12, Love, American Style, Knight Rider, Square Pegs, The Mod Squad, The Hardy Boys and Emergency!.

Dow took a break from his acting career to serve in the California Army National Guard from 1965 to 1968 during the Vietnam War, where he was assigned to the Special Services division and served in Headquarters and Headquarters Company, 40th Armored Division, as a photographer.

During the 1970s, Dow continued acting while working in the construction industry, and studying journalism and filmmaking. In 1977, he parodied his role as Wally from Leave it to Beaver in The Kentucky Fried Movie, with Jerry Zucker playing Beaver.

From 1983 to 1989, Dow reprised his role as Wally Cleaver in a reunion television movie and a subsequent sequel series, The New Leave It to Beaver, for which Dow wrote an episode in 1986. In 1987, he was honored by the Young Artist Foundation with its Former Child Star Lifetime Achievement Award for his role as Wally Cleaver.

In 1989, Dow made his debut as a director with an episode of The New Lassie. It was followed by episodes of Get a Life, Harry and the Hendersons, Coach, Babylon 5, Crusade and Star Trek: Deep Space Nine. Dow served as the visual effects supervisor for Babylon 5. In 1996, he provided visual effects for the FOX television movie Doctor Who.

Dow also co-produced The Adventures of Captain Zoom in Outer Space in 1995, and It Came from Outer Space II in 1996.

== Stage career ==
In 1978, Dow and Jerry Mathers starred in a production of the comedy play Boeing, Boeing, which ran for 10 weeks in Kansas City, Missouri. Dow and Mathers then toured the dinner theater circuit for 18 months in a production of So Long, Stanley, written specifically for the TV brother duo.

== Art career ==
In addition to acting, directing, producing, and writing, Dow was a sculptor, creating abstract bronze sculptures. He said about his work: "The figures are abstract and not meant to represent reality, but rather the truth of the interactions as I see and feel them. I find the wood in the hills of Topanga Canyon and each piece evolves from my subconscious. I produce limited editions of nine bronzes using the lost wax process from molds of the original burl sculpture." Reuters wrote of Dow's work that it "features humanlike forms devoid of expression or detail; they are widely open to the viewer's interpretation."

In December 2008, Dow was chosen as one of three sculptors to show at the Société Nationale des Beaux-Arts exhibition, located in the Carrousel du Louvre in Paris, France. He represented the United States delegation, which was composed of artists from the Karen Lynne Gallery. His sculpture shown at the Parisian shopping mall was titled Unarmed Warrior, a bronze figure of a woman holding a shield.

== Personal life ==
Dow married Carol Marlow in June 1969 and their marriage ended in 1980. They had one child, who was born in 1973.

In June 1980, Dow married Lauren Shulkind.

In the 1990s, Dow revealed that he had suffered from clinical depression. He subsequently starred in self-help videos chronicling this battle, including the 1998 Beating the Blues.

In 2021 Dow was hospitalized with pneumonia.

== Death ==
In May 2022, Dow was diagnosed with liver cancer. He died on July 27, 2022, age 77, a day after his death had first been reported.

== Selected filmography ==
=== Actor ===
- Leave It to Beaver (234 episodes, 1957–1963)
- The Eleventh Hour as Bob Quincy in "Four Feet in the Morning" (1963)
- Dr. Kildare (one episode, 1963)
- The Greatest Show on Earth (one episode, 1964)
- My Three Sons (one episode, 1964)
- Mr. Novak (five episodes, 1963–1965)
- Never Too Young (153 episodes, 1965)
- Adam-12 (one episode, 1970)
- Love, American Style (one episode, 1971)
- The Mod Squad (one episode, 1971)
- Emergency! ("Brushfire", 1972)
- Death Scream (1975)
- General Hospital (unknown episodes, 1975)
- The Kentucky Fried Movie (1977)
- The Hardy Boys/Nancy Drew Mysteries (one episode, 1977)
- Square Pegs (two episodes, 1982)
- Quincy, M.E. (one episode, 1983)
- Knight Rider (one episode, 1983)
- High School U.S.A. (1983)
- The New Leave It to Beaver, or Still the Beaver (1985–1989)
- Murder, She Wrote (one episode, 1987)
- The New Mike Hammer (one episode, 1987)
- Back to the Beach (1987)
- Charles in Charge (one episode, 1989)
- Freddy's Nightmares, or A Nightmare on Elm Street: The Series (two episodes, 1990)
- The Adventures of Captain Zoom in Outer Space (1995)
- Beyond Belief: Fact or Fiction (one episode, 1998)
- Diagnosis: Murder (two episodes, 1999)
- Dickie Roberts: Former Child Star (2003)

=== Visual effects ===
- Babylon 5 (unknown episodes)
- The Adventures of Captain Zoom in Outer Space (1995)
- Doctor Who (1996)

=== Producer ===
- The Adventures of Captain Zoom in Outer Space (1995)
- It Came from Outer Space II (1996)

=== Writer ===
- The New Leave It to Beaver (one episode, 1986)

=== Director ===
- "Field of Fire", Star Trek: Deep Space Nine (season 7)
- Babylon 5 (several episodes)
- Get a Life (episode "Dadicus")
- Coach (several episodes)
- Harry and the Hendersons (Seasons 1 and 2 - 6 total episodes)
- Crusade (several episodes)
