= Jeri Weil =

American actress (born 1948)

- Born: May 15, 1948 (age 78)
- Occupation: Actress
- Years active: 1952-1987

Jeri Weil (born May 15, 1948) is an American former child actress, widely known for her role as Judy Hensler in the classic television series Leave It to Beaver.

== Acting career ==
Prior to her role on Leave It to Beaver, California-born Weil had appeared in two TV series and six films in uncredited roles, including on The Eddie Cantor Story as one of Cantor's daughters. In 1956 Weil appeared in an uncredited role as Linda Hutchins in the western movie The Fastest Gun Alive starring Glenn Ford.

The role of Judy Hensler cast her as a classmate and nemesis of Theodore Cleaver ("The Beaver"). Including the show's pilot, Weil appeared in 31 of the 234 Leave It to Beaver episodes. Weil left the show in 1960 when the show's producers, concerned that she was going through puberty, wanted Weil to bind her breasts to conceal them.

In 1983, following a revival of the Leave It to Beaver series on television and film, Weil appeared on the Match Game-Hollywood Squares Hour as a game show participant / celebrity guest star. She reprised her role as Judy Hensler (Benton) in a single guest appearance on a 1987 episode of the revival series The New Leave it to Beaver.
