= Frank Aletter =

American actor (1926–2009)

Frank George Aletter
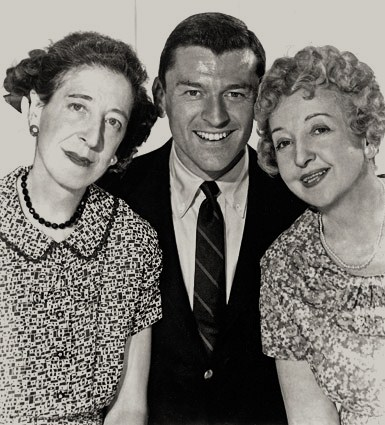
- Doro Merande, Frank Aletter, and Enid Markey from the sitcom Bringing Up Buddy
- Born: January 14, 1926; College Point, Queens, New York City, U.S.
- Died: May 13, 2009 (aged 83); Tarzana, California, U.S.
- Occupation: Actor
- Years active: 1955–1991
- Spouse(s): Lee Meriwether (m. 1958; div. 1974) Estella Gelerter (m. 1984)
- Children: 2

Frank George Aletter (January 14, 1926 – May 13, 2009) was an American actor.

== Early years ==
Born in College Point, Queens, on January 14, 1926, Aletter studied acting at the Dramatic Workshop in Manhattan. He served in the United States Army in Germany from January 1946 to 1948.

== Career ==
Aletter's Broadway debut came in 1950 as a replacement for Eli Wallach in Mister Roberts. During the 1950s, he appeared on Broadway in Bells Are Ringing, Time Limit, and Wish You Were Here.

He soon moved on to a prolific television career, appearing as a guest on numerous shows between 1956 and 1988. Aletter starred in three programs in the 1960s, beginning with Bringing Up Buddy, a sitcom during the 1960–1961 season, featuring Aletter with Enid Markey and Doro Merande, who portrayed his overprotective spinster aunts to Aletter's character, Buddy Flower, a bachelor stockbroker. He appeared in the eighth episode of Lucille Ball's The Lucy Show in the 1962 segment "Lucy the Music Lover." Aletter was cast as Dr. Sam Eastman, an ear-nose-throat specialist who adores classical music.

Aletter's wife, Lee Meriwether, a former Miss America, guest-starred once on Bringing Up Buddy. After Bringing Up Buddy, Aletter guest-starred in Target: The Corruptors, The Lloyd Bridges Show, and The Eleventh Hour. He portrayed murderer Harry Collins on the 1963 Perry Mason episode "The Case of the Skeleton's Closet". Also in 1963, he co-starred in The Twilight Zone episode "The Parallel". In 1964, he played murder victim, television news reporter Tommy Towne, in "The Case of the Arrogant Arsonist."

In the 1965–1966 season, he guest-starred in two episodes of 12 O'Clock High, once as Lt. Col. Bill Christy and as a sergeant in public relations.

Aletter had another regular role in It's About Time, a Sherwood Schwartz series on CBS in 1966–1967.

He played Professor Irwin Hayden in the Richard Donner-directed, 36-part, live-action cliffhanger serial Danger Island on The Banana Splits Adventure Hour, which aired on Saturday mornings on NBC from 1968 to 1970. In the fall of 1970, he had a supporting role in the NBC sitcom Nancy.

His movie roles include Mister Roberts, Tora! Tora! Tora!, and Disney's A Tiger Walks.

Aletter portrayed the supporting role of Tom Logan in the Alcoa Premiere TV Series (S2:E5) entitled "Mr. Lucifer", which aired November 1, 1962. The episode was written by sci-fi writer Alfred Bester, with Fred Astaire as the host and in the title role opposite Elizabeth Montgomery.

Aletter worked with the Screen Actors Guild, having been elected as a vice president in 1987.

Aletter also played George Snyder on the 1970s sitcom Maude in the episode "Love and Marriage" (season one, episode seven).

In 1978, Aletter played advertising executive Mr. Prescott in the episode "The Commercial" of All in the Family.

Aletter played Harry, a bigamist with six wives to whom Blanche is engaged, in the pilot episode of The Golden Girls.

== Personal life ==
Aletter was married to Lee Meriwether from 1958 until their divorce in 1974, and to Estella Gelerter from 1984 until his death in 2009. He had two daughters with Meriwether, and two stepdaughters from his marriage to Gelerter.

== Death ==
On May 13, 2009, Aletter died of cancer at the age of 83 at his home in Tarzana, California. He was cremated and ashes were taken by his daughter in Chatsworth, California.

== Filmography ==
| Year | Title | Role | Notes |
|---|---|---|---|
| 1955 | Mister Roberts | Gerhart | |
| 1964 | A Tiger Walks | Joe Riley | |
| 1970 | Tora! Tora! Tora! | Lt. Commander Thomas | |
| 1972 | Now You See Him, Now You Don't | TV Announcer | |
| 1972 | Run, Cougar, Run | Sam Davis | |
| 1973 | M*A*S*H | Major Stoner | Episode "For the Good of the Outfit" |
| 1975 | Kolchak: The Night Stalker | Norman Cahill | One episode |
| 1983 | Private School | Mr. Leigh-Jensen | |
| 1986 | Vasectomy: A Delicate Matter | Mr. Cromwell | |
