= Jerry Mathers =

Former American actor (born 1948)

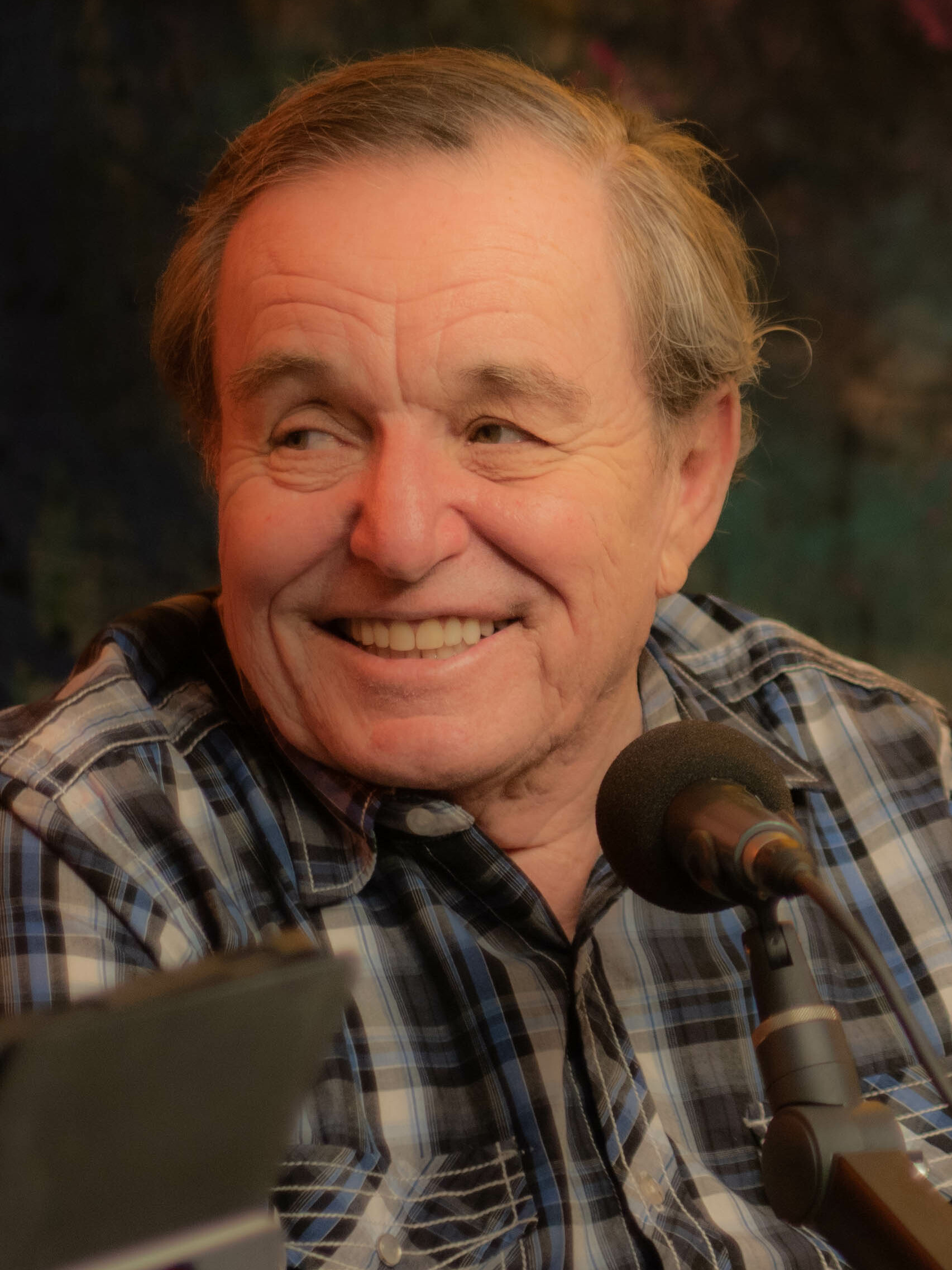
- Mathers in 2023
- Born: Gerald Patrick Mathers; June 2, 1948 (age 78); Sioux City, Iowa, U.S.
- Education: University of California, Berkeley
- Occupation: Actor
- Years active: 1950–2016
- Known for: Portrayal of Theodore "Beaver" Cleaver in Leave It to Beaver
- Spouses: Diana Platt (m. 1974; div. 1981) Rhonda Gehring (m. 1983; div. 1997) Teresa Modnick (m. 2011)
- Children: 3
- Relatives: Jim Mathers (brother)
- Website: www.jerrymathers.com

Gerald Patrick Mathers (born June 2, 1948) is an American former actor best known for his role in the television sitcom Leave It to Beaver, originally broadcast from 1957 to 1963. He played the protagonist Theodore "Beaver" Cleaver, the younger son of the suburban couple June and Ward Cleaver (Barbara Billingsley and Hugh Beaumont, respectively) and the younger brother of Wally Cleaver (Tony Dow).

== Early life and family ==
Mathers was born in Sioux City, Iowa, in 1948, the son of a high school principal, and grew up in the San Fernando Valley, California. Mathers's brother is Jimmy Mathers.

== Early career ==
Mathers began his career at the age of two when he appeared as a child model for a department store ad. Soon after, he starred in a commercial for PET Milk opposite vaudeville comedian Ed Wynn.

His early movies included This Is My Love (1954), Men of the Fighting Lady (1954), The Seven Little Foys (1955) and Alfred Hitchcock's black comedy The Trouble with Harry (1955), in which he plays Arnie, the son of Shirley MacLaine's character, and finds Harry's body in the nearby forest.

=== Leave It to Beaver ===
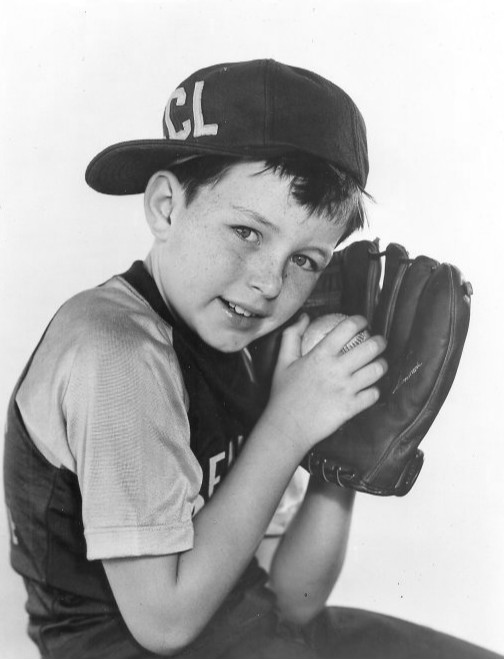
Mathers in a 1959 publicity shot

Mathers states that he got the role of Beaver Cleaver after telling the show's producers he would rather be at his Cub Scout meeting than to do an audition for the part. The producers found his candor appealing and perfect for the role. Mathers played the Beaver for six years, appearing in all 234 episodes of the series. He was the first child actor to have had a deal made on his behalf to get a percentage of the merchandising revenue from a television show. Leave It to Beaver still generates revenue more than six decades after its original production run.

The original sitcom has been shown in over 80 countries in 40 languages. Mathers noted that the Leave It to Beaver phenomenon is worldwide. "I can go anywhere in the world, and people know me," Mathers has said. "In Japan, the show's called The Happy Boy and His Family. So I'll be walking through the airport in Japan, and people will come up and say 'Hi, Happy Boy!'"

When asked in a 2014 television interview whether he had known at the time of the filming of Leave it to Beaver that the show was special, and would be in perpetual syndication, Mathers responded: "No, not at all. I had worked since I was two years old. I did movies. I didn't do any other series, but I had done a lot of movies and things like that so, in fact, every year it was a question whether we would come back for the next year 'cause you had to be picked up. So you would do 39 shows and then we would go to New York and meet all the press, and then we'd go to Chicago to meet the ad people, then we'd come back and take about five to six weeks off, and if we got picked up, then we'd start again. So we did that for six years because that was the length of the contracts at those times. So that's why there are 39 [episodes] for six years, and then it was off the air. Not off the air, but we didn't film any new ones [after that.]"

Mathers remained friends with Barbara Billingsley, who played his TV mother June Cleaver, and he remembered her after her death as "a good friend and an even better mentor. For me she was like the favorite teacher that we all had in school."

=== Music ===
In 1962, near the end of the run of Leave It to Beaver, Mathers recorded two songs for a single 45 rpm: "Don't 'Cha Cry," and for the flip side, the twist ditty "Wind-Up Toy". During high school, Mathers had a band named Beaver and the Trappers.

== Education and military service ==
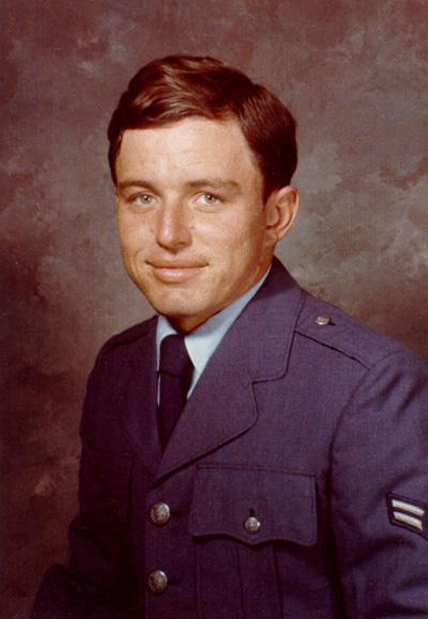
Mathers in U.S. Air Force uniform

As he moved into his adolescence, Mathers retired from acting to concentrate on high school. He attended Notre Dame High School in Sherman Oaks, California. During this time, he led the musical band Beaver and the Trappers.

While still in high school, Mathers joined the U.S. military. From 1966 to 1969, he was a member of the 146th Airlift Wing, nicknamed The Hollywood Guard, of the California Air National Guard in Van Nuys, California. In 1967, while wearing his dress uniform, Mathers, along with child actress Angela Cartwright, presented an Emmy Award to Gene Kelly. In December 1969, a rumor began that Mathers was killed in action in the Vietnam War. Although the origin of the rumor is unclear, Mathers never saw action and was never stationed outside the United States. In 1980, Mathers and Dow appeared with Bill Murray on Saturday Night Live's Weekend Update segment, making fun of the Vietnam War death rumor.

Mathers graduated with a Bachelor of Arts in philosophy from the University of California, Berkeley in 1973.

== Later career ==
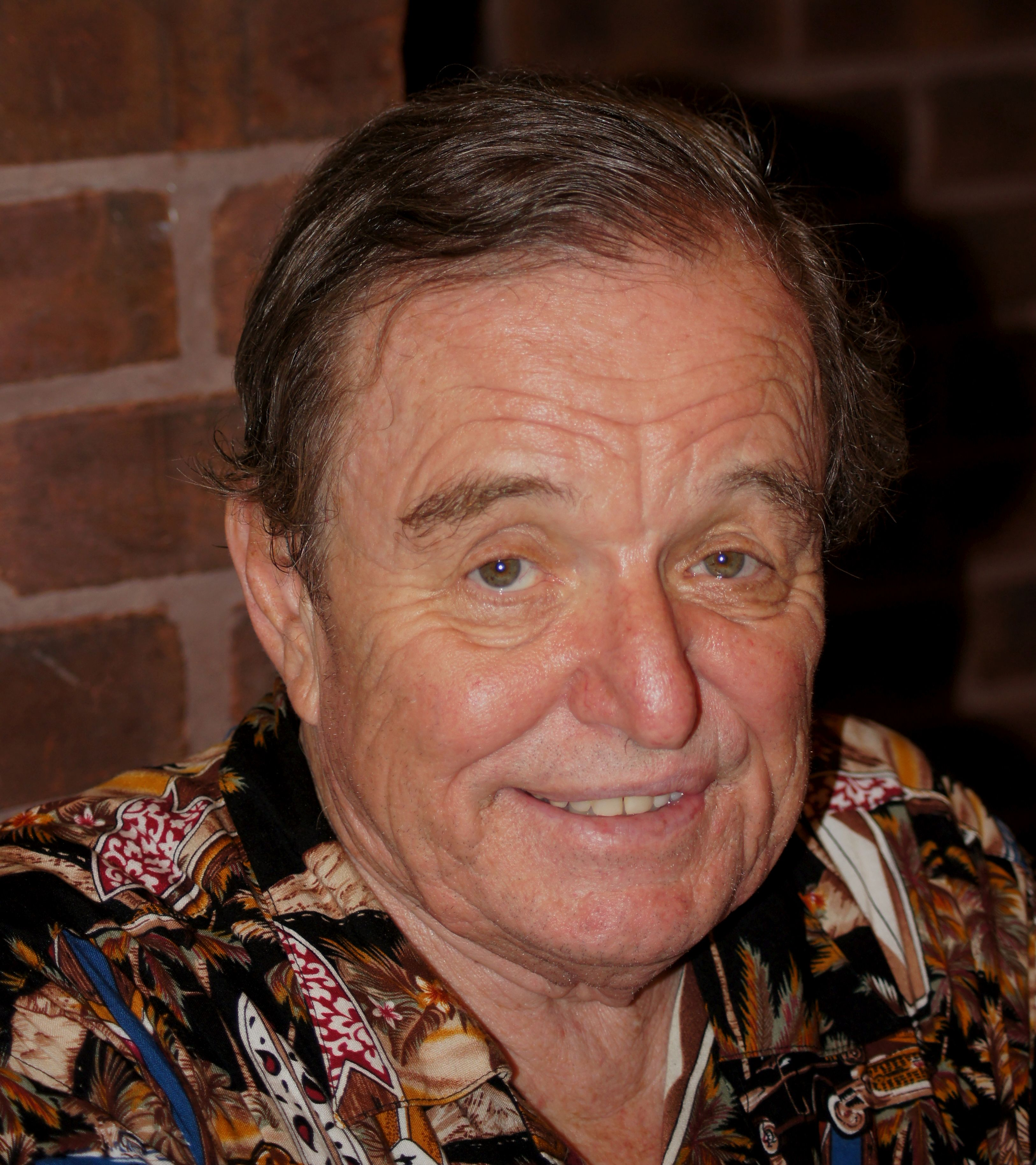
Mathers in 2021

After college, Mathers worked as a commercial loan officer at a bank. He then used well-invested savings from his acting career, in which he earned a starting weekly salary of $500, to begin a career in real estate development.

In 1978, he reentered the entertainment industry. That year, he and Tony Dow starred in a production of the comedy play Boeing, Boeing which ran for 10 weeks in Kansas City, Missouri. Mathers and Dow then toured the dinner theater circuit in a production of So Long, Stanley, written specifically for the TV brother duo, for 18 months.

In 1981, he worked as a disc jockey at KEZY radio in Anaheim, California.

In 1983, Mathers reprised his role in the television reunion film Still the Beaver, which featured the majority of the original cast from Leave It to Beaver. The success of the television movie led to the development of a series with the same title. The series began airing on the Disney Channel in 1984, then aired on TBS and broadcast syndication, where it was retitled The New Leave It to Beaver and ran until 1989.

In the 1990s, Mathers guest-starred on episodes of Parker Lewis Can't Lose, Vengeance Unlimited, Diagnosis: Murder, and as himself on Married... with Children. In 1998, he released his memoir And Jerry Mathers as The Beaver.

In 2001, he appeared on a special episode of Weakest Link, titled "Child TV stars edition," where he got voted off in the first round. On June 5, 2007, he made his Broadway debut with a starring role as Wilbur Turnblad in the musical Hairspray at the Neil Simon Theatre. In 2009, Mathers became the national spokesman for Pharmaceutical Research and Manufacturers of America (PhRMA) and its Partnership for Prescription Assistance.

In 2018 and 2019, Mathers promoted Leave It to Beaver and other classic television shows on MeTV.

== Personal life ==
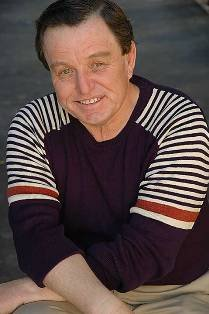
Mathers in 2007

Mathers has been married three times. He met his first wife, Diana Platt, in college. They married in 1974 and later divorced. Mathers met his second wife, Rhonda Gehring, while touring in the production of So Long, Stanley. They have three children. Mathers and Gehring divorced in 1997. Mathers married his third wife, Teresa Modnick, on January 30, 2011.

=== Diabetes ===
Mathers was diagnosed with type 2 diabetes in 1996. On the advice of his doctor, Mathers enrolled in a weight loss program in May 1997 and lost over 40 lb (18 kg), and later became the company's first male spokesperson. He represented a Type 2 diabetes reversal program's publications in a television ad.

== Filmography ==
Film
Year	Title	Role	Notes
1952	Son of Paleface	Child at Finale	Uncredited
1954	Men of the Fighting Lady	Richard Dodson	Uncredited
1954	This Is My Love	David Myer	
1955	The Seven Little Foys	Bryan Lincoln Foy – age 5	Uncredited
1955	The Trouble with Harry	Arnie Rogers	
1956	That Certain Feeling	Norman Taylor	
1956	Bigger Than Life	Freddie	Uncredited
1957	The Shadow on the Window	Petey Atlas	
1958	The Deep Six	Steve Innes	Uncredited
1987	Back to the Beach	Judge #2	
1990	Down the Drain	Policeman (desk)	
1994	The Other Man	Sergeant Dun	Alternative title: Sexual Malice
1998	Playing Patti		
2002	Better Luck Tomorrow	Biology Teacher	
2005	Angels with Angles	Mr. Cohiba	
2008	Will to Power	Mr. Simpson	

Television
Year	Title	Role	Notes
1952	The Adventures of Ozzie and Harriet	Trick-or-treating Child	Episode: "Halloween Party"
1955	Lux Video Theatre	Little Boy	Episode: "The Great McGinty"
1955	General Electric Theater	Tommy	Episode: "Into the Night"
1955	NBC Matinee Theater		Episode: "Santa is no Saint"
1956	Screen Directors Playhouse	Peter at 5	Episode: "It's a Most Unusual Day"
1957–1963	Leave It to Beaver	Theodore "Beaver" Cleaver	234 episodes
1963	Insight		Episode: "The Boy and the Bomb"
1966	The Dating Game	Himself	
1968	Batman	Pop, the Stage Doorman	Episode: "The Great Escape"; Uncredited
1968	Lassie	Ken Hines	Episode: "Lassie and the 4-H Boys"
1970	My Three Sons	Joe Lawrie	Episode: "Love Thy Neighbor"
1978	Flying High	Chuck Wallace	Episode: "Fear of Cheesecake"
1981	The Girl, the Gold Watch & Dynamite	Deputy Henry Thomas Watts	Television film
1983	Match Game-Hollywood Squares Hour	Himself	Game Show Participant / Celebrity Guest Star
1983	Still the Beaver	Theodore "Beaver" Cleaver	Television film
1983–1989	The New Leave It to Beaver	Theodore "Beaver" Cleaver	101 episodes
1984	Hardcastle and McCormick	Cameo Appearance	Season 1; Episode 19 "The Homecoming: Part 2"
1987	The Love Boat	"Beaver" Cleaver	Episode: "Who Killed Maxwell Thorn?"
1991	Married... with Children	Himself	Episode: "You Better Shop Around (Part 2)"
1991	Parker Lewis Can't Lose	Theodore Musso	Episode: "Jerry: Portrait of a Video Junkie"
1999	Vengeance Unlimited	Lucas Zimmerman	Episode: "Friends"
1999	Diagnosis: Murder	Mr. Lustig	Episode: "Trash TV: Part One"
2001	Weakest Link	Himself	Child TV Stars Edition
2006	The War at Home	Principal	Episode: "Back to School"
2008	Mother Goose Parade		Television film

== Awards ==
Year	Award	Category	Title of work
1984	Young Artist Award	Former Child Star "Lifetime Achievement" Award	Leave It to Beaver

== Bibliography ==
- Mathers, Jerry; Fagen, Herb (1998). And Jerry Mathers as The Beaver. Berkley Trade. ISBN 978-0-4251-6370-2.
- Holmstrom, John (1996). The Moving Picture Boy: An International Encyclopaedia from 1895 to 1995. Norwich: Michael Russell. p. 275. ISBN 978-0-8595-5178-6.
