= Bringing Up Buddy =

American sitcom

- Genre: Sitcom
- Created by: Joe Connelly; Bob Mosher
- Starring: Frank Aletter; Doro Merande; Enid Markey
- No. of seasons: 1
- No. of episodes: 36

Production
- Running time: 30 minutes
- Production companies: Kayro-Vue Productions; Revue Studios

Original release
- Network: CBS
- Release: October 10, 1960 – July 3, 1961

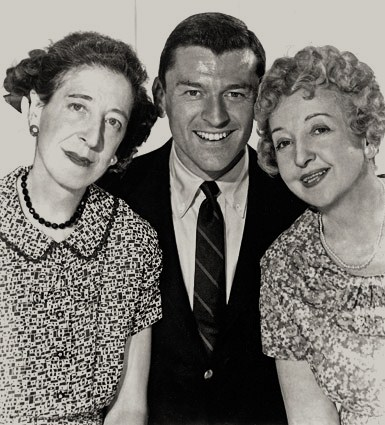
Left to right: Doro Merande, Frank Aletter, and Enid Markey in a promotional photograph for Bringing Up Buddy.

Bringing Up Buddy is an American sitcom that aired on CBS during the 1960–61 television season. It depicts a young bachelor who lives with the two maiden aunts who raised him.

== Synopsis ==
After Richard David "Buddy" Flower's parents died in an automobile accident during his childhood, his maiden aunts Violet ("Vi") and Iris raised him. Now a young bachelor, he still resides with Vi and Iris at 1492 Maple Street in the small town of Bradley Falls, California, and their antics and meddling in his life present endless complications for him. An investment broker at Cooper Investments, where he is romantically involved with his secretary, Kathy Donnell, Buddy often comes home from work to find that his lovable-but-wacky aunts have made some major decision about his life for him, such as finding him the perfect girl to marry, or have gotten themselves in trouble of some kind that he has to get them out of.

== Cast ==
- Frank Aletter as Richard David "Buddy" Flower
- Enid Markey as Aunt Violet "Vi" Flower
- Doro Merande as Aunt Iris Flower
- Nancy Rennick as Kathy Donnell

== Production notes ==
Bringing Up Buddy was created and produced by Joe Connelly and Bob Mosher. It was a production of Kayro-Vue Productions and Revue Studios.

== Broadcast schedule ==
Bringing Up Buddy lasted a single season. Its 36 episodes were broadcast in the United States on CBS at 8:30 PM Eastern Time on Monday nights from October 10, 1960, through July 3, 1961. Episodes then ran as summer repeats in the same timeslot until September 25, 1961.

== Episodes ==
| No. | Title | Directed by | Written by | Original release date |
|---|---|---|---|---|
| 1 | "Working Girls" | Unknown | Unknown | October 10, 1960 |
Vi and Iris try to get jobs to help with the household finances.
| 2 | "The Girl Next Door" | Unknown | Unknown | October 17, 1960 |
Vi and Iris decide to play matchmaker for Buddy when the girl who used to live next door to them turns up in his investment office on business.
| 3 | "The Girls Go to Court" | Unknown | Unknown | October 31, 1960 |
Also called "Girls in Court." Vi and Iris go shopping and end up with a lawsuit on their hands.
| 4 | "Cesare Comes Calling" | Unknown | Unknown | November 7, 1960 |
Buddy is upset when a smooth-talking opera singer takes advantage of an almost-forgotten friendship with Vi and Iris and borrows money from them. Guest star: Robert Weede.
| 5 | "The Blind Date" | Unknown | Unknown | November 14, 1960 |
Buddy agrees to go on a blind date with Angela Brent, the daughter of an important client, and discovers that she seems to analyze everything — even kisses. Guest star: Joanne Linville.
| 6 | "Nephew for Sale" | Unknown | Unknown | November 21, 1960 |
Buddy is furious with Vi and Iris when they run a newspaper ad extolling his virtues as a potential husband — but changes his mind when the responses to the ad start to look good. Guest Stars: Christine White, Claire Carleton, Richard Deacon, Valerie Allen, Majel Barret, and Joan Young.
| 7 | "Gentleman Callers" | Unknown | Unknown | November 28, 1960 |
Wanting to set an example for Buddy by developing a social life of their own and to prove to him they are self-sufficient so he won't feel obliged to stay home and become a middle-aged mother's boy, Vi and Iris go on a double date with two middle-aged bachelors who are "men about town."
| 8 | "Buddy's Birthday" | Unknown | Unknown | December 5, 1960 |
A surprise party for Buddy on his birthday arranged by the staff at his office upsets Vi′s an Iris′s plans to have a traditional birthday dinner with him.
| 9 | "Poppa′s Eagle" | Unknown | Unknown | December 12, 1960 |
Vi and Iris present a treasured heirloom — a stuffed eagle on a stand — to Buddy. He thinks it is ugly and he is allergic to its feathers, so he tries to give it away without hurting his aunts′ feelings, and comes up with the idea that it will lend distinction to his new office. Guest stars: George N. Neise, John Holland, Paul Smith, Clark Howat, and Audrey Swanson.
| 10 | "The Exchange Student" | Unknown | Unknown | December 19, 1960 |
The local college has a housing shortage, so Vi and Iris bring an attractive French exchange student, Jeannine Corot, into their home. For once, Buddy likes their idea — but Jeannine scandalizes the neighborhood. Guest stars: Danielle De Metz, Yvonne Lime, and Douglass Dumbrille.
| 11 | "Repair of Robespierre" | Unknown | Unknown | January 2, 1961 |
Buddy insists that Vi and Iris take their ancient car — which they call "Robespierre" — in for repairs.
| 12 | "Call Me Charlie" | Unknown | Unknown | January 9, 1961 |
Buddy wants to do something to brighten the life of Charlie Baker, a little boy who lives at the Boys Home, so he buys tickets to a football game. Guest stars: Bill Lechner and Dennis Holmes.
| 13 | "Buddy's Transfer" | Unknown | Unknown | January 16, 1961 |
Investment man Charley Sutter offers Buddy a job with a firm in New York City. Guest stars: Joanna Barnes and Yvonne Lime.
| 14 | "The Singer" | Unknown | Unknown | January 23, 1961 |
After Buddy gets trapped in an elevator with a toothsome nightclub singer named Ruth Grayson, he raves to his aunts about Ruth's talent. Vi and Iris misunderstand the nature of this talent, and decide she would be perfect for the church dinner-concert. Guest stars: Joan O'Brien, Irene Ryan, and Joey Faye.
| 15 | "Cousin Jordan" | Unknown | Unknown | January 30, 1961 |
Vi′s and Iris′s black-sheep cousin tries to talk Buddy into establishing a "bottle-of-the-month" club.
| 16 | "The Girls Rent a House" | Unknown | Unknown | February 6, 1961 |
After longtime renters move out of a house that Vi and Iris inherited from Buddy's grandfather many years earlier, Vi and Iris decide to find new tenants themselves. Guest stars: Eduardo Ciannelli, Sally Hughes, and Dee Carroll.
| 17 | "The Education of Nicky Marlo" | Unknown | Unknown | February 20, 1961 |
When 12-year-old Norma "Nicky" Marlo comes for a visit, Vi and Iris are shocked to discover that she is a beatnik. Guest stars: Portland Mason, Frank Albertson, Francine York, and Jimmy Hawkins.
| 18 | "The Painting" | Unknown | Unknown | February 27, 1961 |
A racy painting of Vi′s and Iris′s cousin goes on public view behind the bar of a Gay Nineties-themed saloon.
| 19 | "Selling Shingles" | Unknown | Unknown | March 6, 1961 |
To earn extra money to help a needy sick man and his wife, Vi and Iris become salesladies, peddling a chemical which is supposed to straighten roofing shingles. Guest stars: John Hoyt, Tommy Farrell, Bill Henry, John Alvin, Della Sharman, Jody Fair, and Jack Powers.
| 20 | "Buddy Hires a Maid" | Unknown | Unknown | March 13, 1961 |
Buddy hires a maid to relieve Vi and Iris of the burden of housekeeping.
| 21 | "Cynthia's Boyfriend" | Unknown | Unknown | March 20, 1961 |
Cynthia Boyle runs into Arnold Hamilton on a bus, then tells Vi and Iris that she and Arnold are practically engaged — but when Vi and Iris hold a small betrothal tea for them, Arnold makes a pass at Vi. Guest stars: Irene Ryan, George Chandler, and Chris Warfield.
| 22 | "Buddy's Wife" | Unknown | Unknown | March 27, 1961 |
Vi and Iris suspect that there is a hidden chapter in Buddy's life.
| 23 | "Poppa's Memoirs" | Unknown | Unknown | April 3, 1961 |
Buddy envisions his very circumspect grandfather as the subject of a racy expose when the woman writing his biography turns out to be the author of several classics on sex. Guest star: Adele Mara.
| 24 | "Buddy and Fennimore" | Unknown | Unknown | April 10, 1961 |
When a young man named Fennimore Cooper visits for a weekend, Vi and Iris arrange a date for him with a nice, proper girl — but then they begin to question his own respectability when they find a "girlie" magazine in his room. Guest star: Jimmy Hawkins.
| 25 | "Buddy and the Amazon" | Unknown | Unknown | April 17, 1961 |
When Vi and Iris visit their doctor′s office for a check-up, they decide that Nurse Arnold would be just right for their nephew, so they rush home to persuade him to go in for a check-up, too. Guest stars: Lee Ann Meriwether (Frank Aletter′s real-life wife) and Merry Anders.
| 26 | "Poppa′s Picture" | Unknown | Unknown | April 24, 1961 |
Buddy's late grandfather bequeathed his portrait to the local museum. When Buddy delivers the picture, he finds that the museum is now dedicated to modern art, and its assistant director, Joan Thomas, tells him she can't accept the gift. Guest stars: Patricia Huston, John Holland, and Burt Mustin.
| 27 | "Auntie′s Cake" | Unknown | Unknown | May 1, 1961 |
Wilella Grant comes to the Flower household get Vi and Iris to endorse "Auntie's Old Fashioned Frozen Cake Mix" — and when Buddy opposes the idea, Wilella turns her feminine charms on him. Guest stars: Joyce Meadows, Arte Johnson, and Philip Ober.
| 28 | "The Aunts Have a Baby" | Unknown | Unknown | May 8, 1961 |
While Vi and Iris are shopping, someone abandons a baby in the back sea of their convertible, and they take care of the child during the search for its mother. Guest stars: Nancy Rennick and Joan Staley
| 29 | "Cynthia's Concert Tour" | Unknown | Unknown | May 15, 1961 |
Buddy suspects that Cynthia Boyle is being bilked when a smooth-talking Frenchman books her for a concert.
| 30 | "Buddy's Reenlistment" | Unknown | Unknown | May 22, 1961 |
When Buddy puts on his old United States Army uniform to wear to a reunion dance, his boss thinks he's going back into the Army — and he finds himself out of a job.
| 31 | "Big Game Hunter" | Unknown | Unknown | May 29, 1961 |
When the featured speaker for the Women's League meeting does not show up, Vi and Iris think they have found a substitute in a man billed as "Captain Cunningham – Big-Game Hunter," but Buddy thinks Cunningham is a con artist. Guest stars: Edgar Buchanan and Olive Sturgess.
| 32 | "Buddy and Janie" | Unknown | Unknown | June 5, 1961 |
After Judge Webber asks Vi and Iris to take temporary care of a teenage orphan named Janie, Janie arrives at the Flower household eager to discuss her sad lot in life — and happy to find handsome and understanding Buddy around the house. Guest stars: Sherry Jackson, Charles Watts, and Frank Albertson.
| 33 | "Room for Rent" | Unknown | Unknown | June 12, 1961 |
Vi and Iris rent Buddy's room to identical twins Mary Beth and Ami Davenport. Guest stars: Audrey Dalton (who plays both twins), Janet Lake, and Frank Albertson.
| 34 | "Buddy and the Teenager" | Unknown | Unknown | June 19, 1961 |
Buddy agrees to help relieve the teacher shortage by teaching night classes at a junior college, then learns that it's a women's college. Guest stars: Cheryl Holdridge, Frank Albertson, and Grace Albertson, Ray Montgomery, and Jeanne Tatum.
| 35 | "Behind Bars" | Unknown | Unknown | June 26, 1961 |
Vi and Iris want to trim the old tree in front of their house, then discover that they need a city permit to do it. Guest stars: Frank Albertson, William Bakewell, Justice Watson, Bill Baldwin, George Taylor, William Newell, Jess Kirkpatrick, and Lindsay Workman.
| 36 | "Couple Next Door" | Unknown | Unknown | July 3, 1961 |
Buddy helps the attractive housewife next door by replacing a fuse for her — and arouses the jealousy of her husband.
