= Crown Theatre with Gloria Swanson =

American anthology TV series

Crown Theatre with Gloria Swanson is a 30-minute weekly syndicated American anthology television series produced by Bing Crosby Productions with production in Culver City. It was filmed in New York City (except for some episodes that were filmed in Mexico) and aired from 1952–55 on WPIX. It was also known as The Gloria Swanson Show.

Gloria Swanson served as the hostess for the series and appeared in four episodes. Its guest stars included Vera Miles, Bonita Granville, Barbara Billingsley, Bobby Driscoll, Marjorie Lord, Hans Conreid, Denver Pyle, and Gigi Perreau.

Harve Foster was the director.

Swanson's segments as hostess were removed when CBS Television Film Sales packaged episodes for syndication in 1955. The trade publication Variety reported two reasons for the editing: to allow more time for commercials and to allow each station to have its own host.
