= Adam Zolotin =

American actor (born 1983)

- Born: November 29, 1983 (age 42); New York City, New York, United States
- Occupation: Actor
- Years active: 1993–2007, 2013–2016

Adam Zolotin (born November 29, 1983, in New York City, New York) is a former American actor, best known for appearing in Leave It to Beaver and Jack.

== Filmography ==
=== Film ===
- Jack (1996) as Louis Durante
- Leave It to Beaver (1997) as Eddie Haskell
- Dog's Best Friend (1997) as Wylie Thompson
- Zerophilia (2005) as Chad
- What News? (2007) as Tommy
- Lonely Boy (2013) as Mike

=== Television ===
- Law & Order (1996 and 2000) as Lonnie Rickman/Ricky Velardi (2 episodes)
- Love and Marriage (1996) as Christopher Nardini
- Storm of the Century (1999) as Davey Hopewell
- Law & Order: SVU (2000) as Justin McKenna (1 episode)
- What I Like About You (2005) as Chris's Friend (1 episode)
- The New Adventures of Old Christine (2006) as Mark (1 episode)
- Scrubs (2004) as Reuben (1 episode)
- Mr. Robot (2016) as David (1 episode)

== Theater ==
- Sirens

== Recognition ==
=== Awards and nominations ===
- 1996, YoungStar Awards nomination for 'Best Young Actor in a Comedy Film' for Jack
- 1996, Young Artist Awards nomination for 'Best Performance in a Feature Film - Supporting Young Actor' for Jack
- 1998, Young Artist Awards nomination for 'Best Performance in a Feature Film - Supporting Young Actor' for Leave It to Beaver
