= Studio 57 =

American TV anthology series (1954–1958)

- Title screenshot
- Also known as: Heinz Studio 57
- Genre: Anthology
- Directed by: David Butler; John Brahm; Herschel Daugherty; Peter Godfrey; Richard Irving; Phil Karlson; James Neilson; Ozzie Nelson; Don Weis
- Presented by: Joel Aldrich
- Country of origin: United States
- Original language: English

Production
- Camera setup: Single-camera
- Running time: 25 mins.

Original release
- Network: DuMont (1954–1955); Syndication (1955–1956)
- Release: September 21, 1954 – 1958

Studio 57 (also known as Heinz Studio 57) is an American anthology series that was broadcast on the now-defunct DuMont Television Network from September 1954 to July 1955, and in syndication from 1955 to 1958.

"It's a Small World", the pilot episode of the series Leave It to Beaver, was broadcast on the show on April 23, 1957.

== Overview ==
The program was a filmed anthology television series sponsored by Heinz 57 and produced by Revue Studios. The program aired on the DuMont network from September 21, 1954, to July 26, 1955, making it "one of the last regularly-scheduled series ever carried on the crumbling DuMont network". (Only What's the Story and boxing matches aired on DuMont afterwards). Studio 57 aired in first-run syndication from September 1955 to 1958.

The series was exported to Australia during the late 1950s under the title Whitehall Playhouse. Since some of the episodes shown there were DuMont-aired episodes, this makes Studio 57 the only DuMont show to be broadcast outside of North America. The series began airing in Australia in late 1956, during the first few months of television in that country, continuing for several years, and eventually including episodes of other American anthology series such as The Star and the Story.

Writers whose work was featured on the program included Ray Bradbury.

== Personnel ==
The series featured many established actors, including Carolyn Jones, Hugh O'Brian, Keye Luke, Natalie Wood, Craig Stevens, Marguerite Chapman, Jean-Pierre Aumont, Brian Keith, Rod Taylor, K. T. Stevens, Hugh Beaumont, Peter Graves, Robert Armstrong, Jean Byron, Lon Chaney Jr., Andy Clyde, Charles Coburn, Olive Sturgess, Peter Lawford, Mike Connors, Jane Darwell, Joanne Dru, Vivi Janiss, Keenan Wynn, and DeForest Kelley.

Herschel Daugherty was the director, and Lawrence Kimble was the writer.

== Episodes ==
Partial List of Episodes of Studio 57
Date	Episode	Actor(s)
September 26, 1954	"No Great Hero"	Craig Stevens, Betty Lou Gerson
November 3, 1954	"Never 5:30"	Joanne Davis, Larry Dobkin, Ross Ford
November 10, 1954	"Step Lightly Please"	Virginia Gibson, John Lupton
January 29, 1956	"The Finishers"	Peter Lorre, Carmen Mathews, Gordon Mills.
September 29, 1956	"Little Miss Bedford"	Jessica Tandy, Hume Cronyn, Jacques Aubuchon, Kathryn Givney, Florence Ravenal, Geoffrey Toone, Michael Bachus, Jack Gargan, Mary Gregory, and Thomas Martin

== Critical response ==
Television historians Tim Brooks and Earle Marsh describe the scripts for Studio 57 as bland. Ailing DuMont lacked the budgets of CBS or NBC, and hence relied on cost-cutting measures, including hiring then-unknown actors to star in their series such as Hugh O'Brian and Natalie Wood.

A review of the premiere episode in the trade publication Variety said that the episode "wasn't particularly well-written or too smoothly directed, and hence failed to conjure up suspense." It also said that unnatural parts caused actors to struggle, and the "unperceptive histrionics promoted a cheapness that became connected with the entire show."

== See also ==
- List of programs broadcast by the DuMont Television Network
- List of surviving DuMont Television Network broadcasts

== Bibliography ==
- David Weinstein, The Forgotten Network: DuMont and the Birth of American Television (Philadelphia: Temple University Press, 2004) ISBN 1-59213-245-6
