= June Cleaver =

American television fictional character

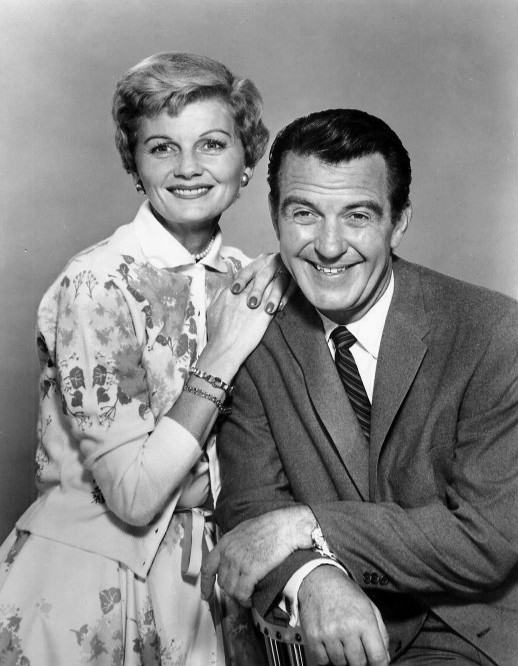
- Barbara Billingsley and Hugh Beaumont as June and Ward Cleaver.
- First appearance: "It's a Small World" (pilot episode) (April 23, 1957)
- Last appearance: Leave It to Beaver (film adaptation, 1997)
- Created by: Joe Connelly; Bob Mosher
- Portrayed by: Barbara Billingsley (television series); Janine Turner (1997 film adaptation)

In-universe information
- Gender: Female
- Occupation: Homemaker
- Family: Theodore Bronson (father); Peggy (sister)
- Spouse: Ward Cleaver (widowed)
- Children: Wallace "Wally" Cleaver; Theodore "Beaver" Cleaver
- Relatives: Wilbur Bronson (uncle); Martha Bronson (aunt); Kip Cleaver (grandson); Oliver Cleaver (grandson); Kelly Cleaver (granddaughter); Kevin Cleaver (grandson); Unnamed niece

June Evelyn Bronson Cleaver is a principal character in the American television sitcom Leave It to Beaver. June and her husband, Ward, are often invoked as the archetypal suburban parents of the 1950s. The couple are the parents of two sons, Wally and "Beaver". Wally is twelve years old and in the seventh grade when the series opens; Beaver is seven years old ("almost eight") and in the second grade. Episodes followed the escapades of Wally and Beaver and usually ended with a moral lesson delivered to the boys, but also often included reminders of childhood and minor lessons for the parents through the adventures of their boys. She was included in Yahoo!'s Top 10 TV Moms from Six Decades of Television for the time period 1957–1963.

June is played by Barbara Billingsley in both the pilot, "It's a Small World" (which aired in April 1957 on Studio '57), and in the original television series. Billingsley also plays the character in the show's television reunion movie, Still the Beaver (1983), and the show's sequel series, The New Leave It to Beaver (1985—1989). In the sequel series, Wally and Beaver are both parents, and June is a grandmother. Janine Turner played June in the 1997 spin-off film adaptation of the original series, Leave It to Beaver. Billingsley made a cameo appearance in the spin-off film as Aunt Martha.

== Character overview ==
=== Early life ===
June's birthplace is mentioned in one episode as East St. Louis while Ward is teasing her about her upbringing and they are discussing how they met. June attended boarding school as a youngster and was captain of the school's basketball team. At one point in her young years, she was a student of Cornelia Rayburn, the principal of Beaver's school. It is implied that June had an affluent upper middle class upbringing (contrasted with Ward's middle class childhood) which may in part account for June's fastidious and fashionable clothing tastes throughout the series. June mentions that she was taught a formal curtsey in the event that she married a diplomat and Aunt Martha frequently proudly refers to their common Bronson lineage. Ward also mentions the Bronson clan's concerns about Ward providing for June in a manner she is accustomed to at their wedding. June mentions her father occasionally. Apparently, he was a practical man, for, according to June, he discouraged her as a child from buying an opal ring in a jewelry store window and urged her instead to spend her money on a pair of galoshes.

=== Marriage ===
As a teen, June knew and dated Ward Cleaver, a farmer's son. Ward lived in nearby Shaker Heights. The two attended State college together. June kept her maiden name, Bronson, as one of her middle names after marrying Ward. Ward and June have two sons, Wally and Theodore aka "Beaver". June's older son, Wally, is a good student and popular with everyone while young Beaver has a difficult time staying out of trouble. The Cleavers live initially at 485 Mapleton Drive and move to 211 Pine Street at the beginning of the third season.

=== Home life ===
Barbara Billingsley in the pilot "It's a Small World", 1957.

June is dedicated to her family; her interests outside the home are social events like weddings or school events like meetings and plays. She has ladylike pastimes: needlepoint, cake decorating, and arranging tea roses. She reads glossy but high-toned, tasteful women's magazines. In one episode, she entertains the ladies in her social club only to see the event ruined by Beaver's monkey who despoils the foods on the dining table. When the boys arrive home from school, June can be found in the kitchen chopping salad vegetables, basting a roast, or icing a cake. Her kitchen is immaculate. Like most TV middle class sitcom families of the era, the Cleavers eat breakfast and lunch in the kitchen while their dinners are full scale affairs in the dining room.

June's taste in home furnishings tends toward British upper class traditional. The front hall in the Pine Street house is adorned with reproductions of Gainsborough's The Blue Boy and Lawrence's "Pinkie" while two fauteuils grace either side of the hall door. A Monet hangs on one wall; a Constable hangs in the living room. A wing chair in the living room is upholstered in a chinoiserie print.

June supervises the boys and their friends.

June is ladylike and slightly formal in personal appearance, always seen with perfectly coiffed hair and tasteful facial makeup. She is notorious among the show's fans for consistently being dressed as a party hostess, even when doing her housework or relaxing around the house. She wears stylish slacks about the house in a few early episodes, but for most of the series her wardrobe consists of simple but elegant dresses, suits, or skirts paired with blouses or sweaters and high-heeled pumps for shoes. Many of her most attractive housefrocks were worn throughout the series' run. She wears a pearl necklace in almost every scene, even when gardening.

June is thrilled when her sons are invited to cotillions and birthday parties but wrinkles her nose with disgust when they bring home wriggling earthworms or rain-soaked clothing. She was described by her husband in the series as a "former belle of East St. Louis."

June and Ward sleep in twin beds and have a portable television set in their room. Now and then, she drives the family's Ford Fairlane if she has a specific errand. Ward occasionally dries the dishes for her; at other times, she has to goad him to do minor chores or repairs around the house. June has occasional house help in the person of Minerva and in the later episodes a Mrs. Manners, who (according to Beaver) smells like gingerbread. June does not completely trust Ward's Uncle Billy because he fills her sons' heads with fancies of irresponsible living. She often places Ward in a position where he must "explain" or apologize for his uncle. She is happily married with never a suggestion otherwise on the show.

=== Relatives ===
In one episode, June has a sister named Peggy and an infant niece. She also has a spinster aunt named Martha Bronson (Madge Kennedy), who appears in a few episodes during the course of the series' run. No other relatives of hers appear on the show. June credits Martha with raising her, which suggests that June may have been a motherless child. Though if this was so, it is not said when her mother died, as June tells a story of how she told a lie in school and her mother made her get up in front of the class and admit she lied. In one episode she mentioned having lived with both of her biological parents as a child.

=== The New Leave It to Beaver ===
By the time the 1983 movie Still the Beaver aired on CBS, series star Hugh Beaumont had died. As a result, the writers and producers decided to make June a widow.

June still lives in the same home (211 Pine Street) as the original series was set. She lives in the home with her son, Beaver (now a businessman and co-owner of the Cleaver and Rutherford Co. with Clarence "Lumpy" Rutherford) and two grandsons, Kip and Ollie. The living arrangement began when Beaver was divorced from his wife, Kimberly, and Beaver was unemployed; it continued after Beaver found work at a business owned by Fred Rutherford and after Beaver got fired for taking a fall for a mistake that Lumpy made and after Lumpy got fired too after confessing that Beaver took the fall for him, they decided to form a competing company together.

June is a member of the Mayfield City Council.

June has four grandchildren; in addition to Beaver's sons, Wally (an attorney) and his wife, Mary Ellen, have two children: Kelly (11 in 1985) and baby Kevin. Kevin was born in 1986 and age-advanced to 4 years old in the following season. Wally and his family live next door to his mother.

== Cameos ==
Barbara Billingsley has made cameos as June Cleaver in the 1980 movie Airplane! and the Roseanne episode "All About Rosey".
