= Leave It to Beaver (film) =

1997 film by Andy Cadiff

- Theatrical release poster
- Directed by: Andy Cadiff
- Written by: Brian Levant; Lon Diamond
- Based on: Leave It to Beaver by Joe Connelly; Bob Mosher
- Produced by: Robert Simonds
- Starring: Christopher McDonald; Janine Turner; Erik von Detten; Adam Zolotin; Cameron Finley
- Cinematography: Thomas Del Ruth
- Edited by: Alan Heim
- Music by: Randy Edelman
- Production company: Robert Simonds Productions
- Distributed by: Universal Pictures
- Release date: August 22, 1997
- Running time: 88 minutes
- Country: United States
- Language: English
- Budget: $15 million
- Box office: $10,925,060

Leave It to Beaver is a 1997 American comedy film directed by Andy Cadiff, based on the 1957–1963 television series of the same name. Many in-jokes and sub-plots relating to the series are adapted for the film. It features many of the original regular characters, most played by new actors, with some cameos by the original TV cast. The film was released by Universal Pictures on August 22, 1997.

== Plot ==
Beaver has his heart set on a bike in a store window. Eddie Haskell, Wally's best friend, tells him that if he flatters Ward by signing up for football, he will get it for his birthday. He joins the football team and endures the practices, despite his disadvantage of being smaller than his teammates. He even goes so far as to refuse to let Ward read him a bedtime story and kiss him goodnight. When he celebrates his birthday, he is presented with the new bike, as well as a computer from his great-aunt.

On the first day of school, five days later, Ward and June tell Wally to accompany Beaver for a few days while he gets used to riding his new bike to there. He has a kind new teacher named Miss Landers. After school, Eddie asks Wally to come in to the soda shop to see him flirt with a girl named Karen. Eddie does not want Beaver to follow them, so Wally leaves him alone at the bike rack, telling him he will be back for him. While Beaver is polishing his bike, a teenage boy comes up to him and asks if he can show him some bike tricks. The boy shows him the tricks before riding off with the bike. At the soda shop, Karen likes Wally and not Eddie. When Wally and Eddie come out and hear that Beaver's bike was stolen, they look for it, but can't find it. During dinner that night, Beaver and Wally try to cover up for the missing bike. When Beaver is pressured to tell the truth and says his bike was stolen, Ward is upset with Beaver, but angrier at Wally because he was responsible for watching him. In Beaver and Wally's bedroom, they get into a fight, which sends Beaver's new computer flying out the open window. Wally grabs the wire and tries to pull it in, but the wire breaks, and it crashes on the ground and smashes into pieces. This results in Ward completely losing all of his patience and grounding Beaver and Wally.

After the grounding, Beaver has his first football game, but it ends poorly when he is tricked into passing the ball to a kid on the opposing team, whom he remembered as a friend from summer camp. Beaver begins falling behind in class and Miss Landers asks Beaver to stay after school to help him with his studies, which Beaver uses as an opportunity to skip football practice, though he doesn't tell his parents he's doing so. Wally and Karen kiss at a party and begin spending time together. However, Karen breaks up with Wally after reuniting with her ex-boyfriend, Kyle. One day after school, Beaver encounters the boy who stole his bike. The boy, who is Kyle's younger brother, challenges him, as a way of getting it back, to climb up to a gigantic coffee mug atop the local cafe, which he falls into and can't get out of. At the same time, Ward finds out that Beaver has been skipping football. After being alerted by police, the fire department and Ward help get Beaver down from the cup. Ward realizes that Beaver may be under too much pressure and says he can quit the football team, but he rejoins it. During the next game, he catches the ball and scores a touchdown, while chasing after his stolen bike. As Beaver chases the boy through the Mayfield Festival, Kyle trips Beaver to help his brother escape, and Wally retaliates by pushing Kyle into a tub of fudge. Karen is put off by Kyle's bullying and sprays whipped cream on his head. Karen then leaves Kyle for Wally. Beaver uses an ice cream cart to block the boy's way, causing him to fly across a judges' table of pies set up to be judged and into an entire cart of them, resulting in Beaver getting his bike back. At home, Ward sees him polishing it, tells him that it would be safer if it stays in the house, and, at his request, reads him a bedtime story.

== Cast ==
- Christopher McDonald as Ward Cleaver
- Janine Turner as June Cleaver
- Cameron Finley as Theodore "Beaver" Cleaver
- Erik von Detten as Wallace "Wally" Cleaver
- Adam Zolotin as Eddie Haskell, Jr.
- Erika Christensen as Karen L. Connelly
- Alan Rachins as Fred Rutherford
- Grace Phillips as Miss Landers
- E.J. de la Peña as Larry Mondello
- Justin Restivo as Lumpy
- Geoff Pierson as Coach Gordon
- Louis Martin Braga as Gilbert Bates
- Shirley Prestia as Clara Hensler
- Brighton Hertford as Judy Hensler
- Fran Bennett as Dr. Beawood
- Matthew Carey as Kyle
- Brenda Song as Susan Akatsu

Cameos by actors and actresses from the television series

- Barbara Billingsley as Aunt Martha
- Ken Osmond as Eddie Haskell Sr.
- Frank Bank as Frank

== Production ==
5,000 actors auditioned for the role of Beaver. Leave It to Beaver was filmed in Los Angeles in the summer of 1996.

== Reception ==
The film was poorly received by critics, as it currently holds an approval rating of 21% on Rotten Tomatoes based on 28 reviews, with an average rating of 4.1/10. The site's consensus states: "Declining to update the television series' sensibility for modern audiences while lacking in its requisite charm, Leave it to Beaver should have just left these characters in the past." Metacritic, which uses a weighted average, assigned the film a score of 42 out of 100, based on 16 critics, indicating "mixed or average" reviews.

Roger Ebert gave it 3 out of 4 stars writing, "I was surprised to find myself seduced by the film's simple, sweet story, and amused by the sly indications that the Cleavers don't live in the 1950s anymore."

=== Box office ===
The film grossed an estimated $10.9 million in the United States and Canada against a $15 million production budget.

== Home media ==
The film was released on January 20, 1998, on VHS, DVD, and LaserDisc. It was re-released on DVD on March 20, 2007, as part of a 'Family Favorites 4-Movie Collection' (with The Little Rascals, Casper, and Flipper). All are presented in anamorphic widescreen.

On August 13, 2019, it was released on Blu-ray.

== Cancelled sequels ==
Prior to the film's release, Universal signed the cast for two sequels. They were quietly cancelled after the film underperformed at the box office.

== Award nominations ==
Cameron Finley, Erik von Detten and Adam Zolotin were all nominated at the 19th Youth in Film Awards for their performances.
