= Leave It to Beaver =

American television sitcom (1957–1963)

- Season one title screen
- Genre: Sitcom; Children's television series
- Created by: Joe Connelly; Bob Mosher
- Starring: Hugh Beaumont; Barbara Billingsley; Tony Dow; Jerry Mathers
- Theme music composer: David Kahn; Melvyn Leonard; Mort Greene
- Opening theme: "The Toy Parade"
- Composers: Pete Rugolo (1957–62); Paul Smith (1962–63)
- Country of origin: United States
- Original language: English
- No. of seasons: 6
- No. of episodes: 234 (list of episodes)

Production
- Producers: Joe Connelly; Bob Mosher
- Production locations: Republic Studios; Universal Studios; Los Angeles
- Camera setup: Single-camera
- Running time: 30 minutes
- Production companies: Revue Studios; MCA TV; Gomalco Productions (1957–1961) (seasons 1–4); Kayro Productions (1961–1963) (seasons 5–6); Universal Television

Original release
- Network: CBS
- Release: October 4, 1957 – July 16, 1958
- Network: ABC
- Release: October 2, 1958 – June 20, 1963

Related
- Still the Beaver; The New Leave It to Beaver; Leave It to Beaver (1997 film)

Leave It to Beaver is an American television sitcom that follows the misadventures of a suburban boy, his family and his friends. It starred Barbara Billingsley, Hugh Beaumont, Tony Dow and Jerry Mathers.

CBS first broadcast the show on October 4, 1957, but dropped it after one season. ABC picked it up and aired it for another five years, from October 2, 1958, to June 20, 1963. It proved to be a scheduling challenge for both networks, moving through four time slots (Wednesday through Saturday evenings) over the course of its run. The series was produced by Gomalco Productions from 1957 to 1961, and then by Kayro Productions from 1961 to 1963. It was distributed by Revue Studios.

While Leave It to Beaver never broke into the Nielsen Ratings top 30 in its six-season run, it proved to be much more popular in reruns. It also led to an unsuccessful 1997 film of the same name.

== Premise ==
The show is built around young Theodore "Beaver" Cleaver (Jerry Mathers) and the trouble he gets himself into while navigating an often incomprehensible, sometimes illogical world. Supposedly, when he was a baby, his older brother Wallace "Wally" (Tony Dow) mispronounced "Theodore" as "Tweedor". Their firm-but-loving parents, Ward (Hugh Beaumont) and June Cleaver (Barbara Billingsley), felt "Beaver" sounded better. Conversely, Mathers has said that the real reason for the name "Beaver" is that one of the show's writers, Joe Connelly, had a shipmate named "The Beaver" in World War II; from that came the family's name, "Cleaver."

Beaver's friends include the perpetually apple-munching Larry Mondello (Rusty Stevens) in the early seasons, and, later, Gilbert Bates (Stephen Talbot), as well as the old firefighter, Gus (Burt Mustin). His sweet-natured-but-no-nonsense elementary school teachers are Miss Canfield (to whom Beaver declares his love in the episode entitled "Beaver's Crush") (Diane Brewster), Miss Landers (Sue Randall) and Mrs. Rayburn (Doris Packer), the school's principal. In the early seasons, Beaver's nemesis in class is Judy Hensler (Jeri Weil).

In its first season, Wally was in eighth grade and 12 years old, while Beaver was 7 and in second grade, a five-year age difference; in real life, the two actors were only three years apart. By the series' end, the boys were inexplicably only four years apart, with Wally graduating from high school and Beaver graduating from grammar school. Wally is popular with both peers and adults, getting into trouble much less frequently than some of the other characters. He letters in three sports. He has little difficulty attracting girlfriends, among them Mary Ellen Rogers (Pamela Baird) and Julie Foster (Cheryl Holdridge). His pals include the awkward Clarence "Lumpy" Rutherford (Frank Bank) and smart aleck Eddie Haskell (Ken Osmond), the archetype of the two-faced wise guy, a braggart among his peers and an obsequious yes man to the adults he mocks behind their backs. Eddie often picks on the Beaver.

The family lives in the fictional town of Mayfield. The location of the town is never mentioned. Beaver attends Grant Ave. Grammar School and Wally attends Mayfield High School (after graduating from Grant Ave. in season one).

== Cast ==
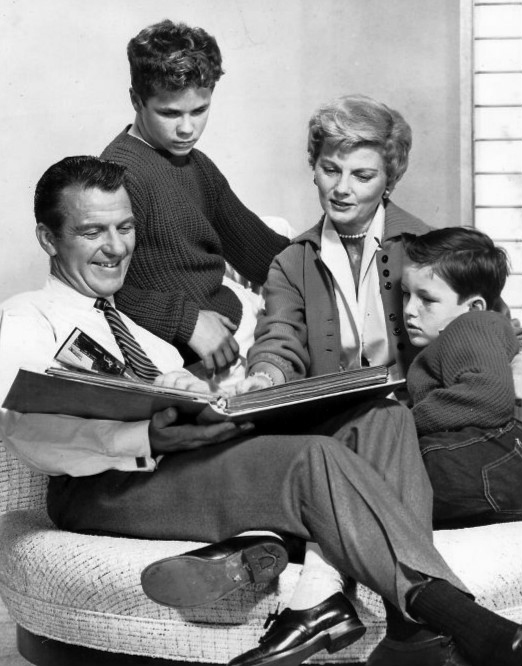
The Cleaver family

=== Main characters ===
- Barbara Billingsley as June Cleaver: Billingsley has said that June Cleaver's wardrobe was more than a fashion statement. The pearl necklace hid a hollow on her neck that would have caused shadows and high-heeled shoes were employed to offset the boys' growing height.
- Hugh Beaumont as Ward Cleaver: Before he made Ward Cleaver his acting trademark, Beaumont sometimes played villains in film and television. He directed a number of Leave It to Beaver episodes in the last two seasons, including the final one, the retrospective "Family Scrapbook".
- Tony Dow as Wally Cleaver
- Jerry Mathers as Theodore "Beaver" Cleaver: The casting directors noticed that Mathers was uneasy at the auditions and asked him where he would rather be. Mathers replied that he would rather be at his Cub Scout den meeting, where he was going after the audition. That boyish innocence got Mathers the part of Beaver.

=== Supporting characters ===
- Ken Osmond as Eddie Haskell
- Eddie Haskell's parents played by:
  - Karl Swenson in two 1958 episodes, "Train Trip" and "Voodoo Magic".
  - Ann Doran in the 1958 episode "Voodoo Magic".
  - John Alvin in the 1961 episode "Eddie Spends the Night".
  - Anne Barton in two 1963 episodes, "Summer in Alaska" and "The Credit Card".
  - George O. Petrie in two 1963 episodes, "Summer in Alaska" and "The Credit Card".
- Diane Brewster as Miss Canfield (October 4, 1957 – March 21, 1958 air dates), Beaver's first teacher at Grant Avenue Grammar School. Brewster also played Miss Simms in the pilot episode.
- Sue Randall as Miss Alice Landers (October 16, 1958 – June 20, 1963), Beaver's teacher, replacing Miss Canfield
- Doris Packer as Mrs. Rayburn, the principal of Grant Avenue Grammar School
- Stephen Talbot as Gilbert Bates (March 19, 1959 – June 6, 1963): Appears first as an insecure braggart, becomes a character who constantly gets Beaver in trouble, and ends up as Beaver's best friend.
- Rusty Stevens as Larry Mondello (November 22, 1957 – 1960)
- Majel Barrett as Gwen Rutherford
- Madge Blake as Margaret Mondello, Larry's mother
- Richard Correll as Richard Rickover (April 30, 1960 – October 18, 1962)
- Stanley Fafara as Hubert "Whitey" Whitney (October 4, 1957 – June 6, 1963). In the first episode, his name was “Harold”.
- Jeri Weil as Judy Hensler (October 4, 1957 – October 15, 1960)
- Karen Sue Trent as Penny Woods (1960 - 1962)
- Burt Mustin as Gus the fireman, head of Auxiliary Firehouse No. 7 (October 4, 1957 – February 24, 1962)
- Frank Bank as Clarence "Lumpy" Rutherford
- Richard Deacon as Fred Rutherford, Lumpy's pompous, demanding father and Ward Cleaver's equally pompous, smug co-worker
- Buddy Hart as Chester Anderson
- Tiger Fafara (Stanley Fafara's brother) as Tooey Brown, Wally's friend
- Pamela Baird as Mary Ellen Rogers (April 16, 1958 – June 20, 1963), Wally's first girlfriend
- Cheryl Holdridge as Julie Foster (January 7, 1961 – April 11, 1963), another of Wally's girlfriends

== Episodes ==
Season	Episodes	Originally released	
Season	Episodes	First released	Last released
Pilot		April 23, 1957	
1	39	October 4, 1957	July 16, 1958
2	39	October 2, 1958	June 25, 1959
3	39	October 3, 1959	June 25, 1960
4	39	October 1, 1960	June 24, 1961
5	39	September 30, 1961	June 30, 1962
6	39	September 27, 1962	June 20, 1963

The pilot, titled "It's a Small World", aired on April 23, 1957. It featured Max Showalter (credited as Casey Adams) as Ward Cleaver, and Paul Sullivan as Wally Cleaver. TBS re-aired the pilot on October 4, 1987, to commemorate the show's 30th anniversary. TV Land re-aired it on October 6, 2007, as part of their twenty-four-hour marathon to commemorate the show's 50th anniversary. It is also available as a bonus episode on the season-one DVD; 234 episodes followed.

The second episode, "Captain Jack", was intended to be the pilot, but as Jerry Mathers told Fox News in 2014, the episode had to show a toilet, which censors would not allow at the time. Wally and Beaver put their pet alligator in the toilet tank, since it needed to be in water. The episode was finally allowed to air with just the toilet tank showing. Mathers said the show "actually set some precedent for the television industry."

A voice-over by Hugh Beaumont precedes each episode in the first season, providing a background to that episode's theme. These are omitted in airings on TV Land, but included in airings on MeTV.

=== Opening titles ===
Season one: The characters are not shown. A drawing of a street, viewed from above, displays the credits in wet concrete.

Season two: Ward and June, standing at the bottom of the stairs, see the boys off to school as they come down the stairs and exit the front door.

Season three: Ward and June enter the boys' bedroom to wake them.

Season four: Ward and June open the front door and stand on the stoop. As Wally, followed by Beaver, leave for school, June hands them their lunches; Ward gives them their jackets.

Season five: June takes refreshments to the men in the front yard.

Season six: June, carrying a picnic basket, walks from the front door towards the car. Ward, carrying a thermos jug for the picnic, is next, followed in quick succession by Wally. Beaver, lagging behind, runs out, slamming the door behind him. Ward, with June in the passenger seat and the boys in back, then reverses toward the camera.

=== Musical theme ===
The show's playfully-bouncy theme tune, which became as much of a show trademark as Beaver's baseball cap or Eddie Haskell's false obsequiousness, was "The Toy Parade," composed by David Kahn, Melvyn Leonard, and Mort Greene. For the final season, however, the song was given a jazz-like arrangement by veteran composer/arranger Pete Rugolo.

== Syndication ==
Reruns of the show became part of CBS affiliates' lineups in the mornings for several years. TBS aired the show for many years in the late 1980s. TV Land began airing it in July 1998, MeTV in May 2013, Nick Jr in September 2000, Antenna TV in May 2015 and FETV in August 2021. MeTV currently airs it weekdays at 8am & 8:30am ET and Sundays at 1pm & 1:30pm ET, while FETV airs it weekdays at 10:30am & 11:05am ET, weekends at 2am & 2:35am ET and 9am & 9:35am ET. Today, NBCUniversal Television owns the syndication rights and all properties related to the series.

== Spinoffs ==
A made-for-television reunion movie, Still the Beaver, appeared in 1983. The main original cast appeared, except for Beaumont, who had died the previous year. Ward Cleaver was still a presence, however: the film's story used numerous flashbacks to the original show, as it followed young-adult Beaver's struggle to reconcile divorce and newly minted single fatherhood, straining to cope with what his father might or might not have done, as he faces the possibility of his widowed mother selling their childhood home. June Cleaver is later elected to the Mayfield City Council.

Its reception led to a new first-run, made-for-cable series, The New Leave It to Beaver (1984–1989), with Beaver and Lumpy Rutherford running Ward's old firm (where Lumpy's pompous, demanding father — played by Richard Deacon in the original series — had been the senior partner), Wally as a practicing attorney and expectant father, June having sold the old house to Beaver himself but living with him as a doting grandmother to Beaver's two young sons. Eddie Haskell runs his own contracting business and has a son, Freddie, who is just like his father, right down to the dual-personality.

=== Feature film ===
1997's movie adaptation of the series starred Christopher McDonald as Ward, Janine Turner as June, Erik von Detten as Wally, and Cameron Finley as Beaver. It was panned by many critics, except for Roger Ebert, who gave it a three-star rating. It performed poorly at the box office, earning only $10,925,060 against a budget of $15 million. Barbara Billingsley, Ken Osmond and Frank Bank made cameo appearances in the film.

== Other media ==
=== Books ===
Beverly Cleary wrote three novels based on the show:

- Leave it to Beaver New York : Berkley, 1960. Berkley Medallion book, G406.
- Here's Beaver! New York : Berkley, 1961. Berkley Medallion book.
- Beaver and Wally New York : Berkley, 1961

Juvenile books

- Leave It to Beaver by Lawrence Alson New York : Golden Books, 1959
- Leave It to Beaver: Fire by Cole Fannin Racine, Wisconsin; Whitman Publishing Company 1962

There was also a novelization of the 1997 film:

- Leave It to Beaver by Lisa Rojany-Buccieri Los Angeles, Calif. Price Stern Sloan 1997.

== House ==
The Cleavers moved from 485 Mapleton Drive to 211 Pine Street, both in Mayfield, for the start of season three. In 1969, the house was reused for another Universal-produced television hit, Marcus Welby, M.D. This house can still be seen at Universal Studios, though the original façade was replaced in 1988 for the following year's The 'Burbs and sits in storage elsewhere on the Universal lot. The façade was replaced again for the 1997 Leave It to Beaver movie.

== Home media ==
Universal Studios released the first two seasons of Leave It to Beaver on DVD in Region 1 in 2005/2006.

On January 26, 2010, it was announced that Shout! Factory had acquired the rights to the series (under license from Universal). They subsequently released the remaining seasons on DVD as well as a complete series box set.

On January 31, 2012, Shout! Factory released a 20-episode best-of set titled Leave It to Beaver: 20 Timeless Episodes.

Universal Pictures Home Entertainment announced a release of the complete series on Blu-ray that was released on November 14, 2023.

DVD name	Ep #	Release date	Refs
The Complete First Season	39	November 22, 2005	
The Complete Second Season	39	May 2, 2006	
Season Three	39	June 15, 2010	
Season Four	39	September 14, 2010	
Season Five	39	December 14, 2010	
Season Six	39	March 1, 2011	
The Complete Series	234	June 29, 2010	

== Urban legends ==
In the mid-1970s, Mathers appeared on The Tomorrow Show hosted by Tom Snyder. Snyder pointed out that Mathers had not worked for a long time and that there was rumor going around that he had been killed "in the war in Southeast Asia". Mathers replied that he heard that rumor and he had no idea how it started. The rumor began when a Sgt. Steven Mathers was killed in Vietnam in 1968, and news wire services erroneously reported this was the Beaver. Actress Shelley Winters allegedly announced it on The Tonight Show, bringing the rumor to a wider audience. Mathers said later the rumor was so widespread that his close friend and former costar Tony Dow sent bereavement flowers to his parents. In actuality, Jerry Mathers never set foot in Vietnam, though he did serve in the Air National Guard.

Another urban legend was that actor Ken Osmond (Eddie Haskell) became porn star John Holmes. Holmes took Osmond's name and did several movies satirically under the name "Eddie Haskell". It started because there was some facial resemblance between the two men, which porn distributors exploited by using the name Eddie Haskell in advertising Holmes's films. "It was a pain in my butt for eleven years," says Osmond, who brought a $25 million defamation suit against porn houses, producers and distributors. The suit went all the way to the California Supreme Court. The court ruled for Holmes, saying the name was protected as a satire. This case set a precedent in the matter, and is still referred to in other cases in California today.

== Notes ==
General

- Applebaum, Irwyn, The World According to Beaver, TV Books, 1984, 1998. ISBN 1575000520.
- Bank, Frank, Call Me Lumpy: My Leave It to Beaver Days and Other Wild Hollywood Life, Addax, 2002. ISBN 978-1886110298.
- Colella, Jennifer, The Leave It to Beaver Guide to Life: Wholesome Wisdom from the Cleavers! Running Press, 2006. ISBN 9780762427734.
- Ehrlich, John, and Richard A., 75 Aromatic Years of Leavitt & Pierce in Recollection of 31 Harvard Men, 1883–1958. Cambridge: Leavitt and Pierce Tobacconists, 1958.
- Genzlinger, Neil, "Golly, Beav, We’re Historic". The New York Times, 5 June 2010.
- Humek, Brian, "The World Famous Beaverpedia", New Siberian Publishing, 2022. ISBN 9798848078985.
- Kassel, Michael B., Mass Culture, History and Memory and the Image of the American Family, PhD dissertation, Michigan State University, 2005 65(9): 3537-A. DA3146050 613p. doi:10.25335/73g8-9t70.
- Keck, William (3 October 2007), "Leave It to Jerry 'Beaver' Mathers, Tony Dow". USA Today.
- Osmond, Ken, Eddie: The Life and Times of America's Preeminent Bad Boy, 2014. ISBN 0990727300.
- Mathers, Jerry, ...And Jerry Mathers as "The Beaver", Berkley Boulevard Books, 1998. ISBN 0425163709.
- Shaffer, Jeffrey, "Epic Beaver Cleaver", The Christian Science Monitor, 28 May 1999, 91:128.
- Todt, Ron, "Beaver College Announces New Name". ABC News, 6 January 2006.
- Universal Studios, "Leave It to Beaver:" The Complete Series—Seasons 1–6, Los Angeles: DVD Empire, beginning 2005. ISBN 1417074876.
