= Bob Mosher =

American screenwriter

Robert Mosher
- Born: January 18, 1915; Auburn, New York, US
- Died: December 15, 1972 (aged 57); Los Angeles, California, US
- Education: B.A. Susquehanna University
- Occupation: television scriptwriter

Robert L. Mosher (January 18, 1915 – December 15, 1972) was a United States television and radio scriptwriter.

== Biography ==
Mosher was born in Auburn, New York, to Robert L. Mosher Sr. and Marian K. Mosher (née McCamey). He was best known for his work on Amos and Andy, Meet Mr. McNutley, Leave It to Beaver, Ichabod and Me, Bringing Up Buddy, and The Munsters, along with his co-writer Joe Connelly who is buried in Culver City's Holy Cross Cemetery. Mosher was a 1937 Susquehanna University graduate. He died of a brain tumor in the Encino district of Los Angeles. He was directly cremated at Chapel of the Pines Crematory.
