= Joe Connelly (producer) =

American scriptwriter (1917–2003)

- Born: August 22, 1917; New York City, U.S.
- Died: February 13, 2003 (aged 85); Newport Beach, California, U.S.
- Occupations: Television writer, television producer
- Years active: 1951–1995

Joe Connelly (August 22, 1917 – February 13, 2003) was an American television and radio scriptwriter. He was best known for his work on The Amos 'n' Andy Show, Meet Mr. McNutley, Leave It to Beaver, Ichabod and Me, Bringing Up Buddy, and The Munsters, along with his co-writer Bob Mosher.

== Career ==
Connelly had a stint in the Merchant Marine before landing a job at the J. Walter Thompson advertising agency in New York City, where he met Mosher, a fellow copywriter. Connelly and Mosher left the agency in 1942 and moved to Hollywood to write for the Edgar Bergen and Charlie McCarthy radio show.

In the mid-1940s, after writing for the Frank Morgan and Phil Harris radio shows, they began a 12-year run writing for The Amos 'n' Andy Show including the early 1950s TV version of the popular radio show. Their first solo effort in television was developing a short-lived anthology series for actor Ray Milland, a "disappointing" experience that taught them, Connelly said, to focus their writing instead on "things we know".

Connelly and Bob Mosher were nominated for an Academy Award for Best Story for The Private War of Major Benson, a 1955 comedy that starred Charlton Heston as a hard-nosed Army major who takes command of the ROTC program at a children's academy. It was inspired by an incident Connelly witnessed while driving one of his sons to parochial school.

Leave It to Beaver took their dictum of writing about "things we know" to a new level. Connelly, the father of seven children, and Mosher, the father of two, had to look no further than their own homes for inspiration. Connelly's 14-year-old son, Jay, served as the model for Beaver's older brother, Wally; and Connelly's 8-year-old son, Ricky, was the inspiration for Beaver, the nickname of one of Connelly's merchant marine shipmates. Connelly reportedly followed his children around with a pad of paper writing down funny situations and lines that were later used in the show.

Connelly and Mosher wrote and produced the TV program Calvin and the Colonel, "an animated series for adults", which debuted in the fall of 1961. The leads were voiced by the stars of The Amos 'n' Andy Show from radio. The show was Connelly's and Mosher's first venture into animation. Episodes were produced in color to facilitate anticipated use as short films in Europe.

Leave It to Beaver was canceled in 1963, so Connelly and Mosher continued to develop and produce another family situation comedy, The Munsters. The series ran for two seasons.

Their next sitcom Pistols ‘n’ Petticoats was canceled in 1967, which prompted Connelly and Mosher to end their longtime partnership. Mosher, who retired soon after, passed away in 1972.

Connelly was the producer for Change of Habit, Elvis Presley's final film. His career ended after an aneurysm almost killed him in the early 1970s.

== Personal life and death ==
Connelly was born in New York City in 1917. As a child he spent several summers in Bellport, New York — the inspiration for Mayfield in the Leave it to Beaver series.

Connelly and his wife, the former Kathryn Scanlon, had three sons and four daughters.

He died of a stroke while in the Motion Picture Country Home nursing home in Newport Beach, California after suffering from Alzheimer's disease for years. He was 85 years old. Connelly outlived both of his wives, Kathryn and Ann. He had 12 grandchildren and 6 great-grandchildren. His urn was buried in Culver City's Holy Cross Cemetery after his cremation service within the Mortuary's crematory.
