= Hi Honey, I'm Home! =

American comedy television series

- Created by: Rick Mitz; Penny Stallings; Barry Secunda
- Starring: Charlotte Booker; Stephen C. Bradbury; Julie Benz; Peter Benson; Susan Cella
- Theme music composer: Rupert Holmes
- Opening theme: "Hi Honey, I'm Home!" performed by Rupert Holmes
- Country of origin: United States
- Original language: English
- No. of seasons: 2
- No. of episodes: 14 (1 unaired)

Production
- Executive producer: Rick Mitz
- Producer: Penny Stallings
- Running time: 22–24 minutes
- Production company: RiPe Productions

Original release
- Network: ABC (season 1); Nick at Nite (seasons 1–2)
- Release: July 19, 1991 – July 12, 1992

Hi Honey, I'm Home! is an American television sitcom that ran from July 19, 1991, to July 12, 1992, for 13 episodes. Each week, a new episode of the series aired on ABC as part of its Friday night TGIF lineup. The same episode would re-air Sunday night on Nickelodeon as part of the channel's Nick at Nite lineup. ABC stopped airing the series after the sixth episode of the first season. The show's second and final season only aired on Nick at Nite before being canceled in July 1992. The series was taped before a live audience in Nickelodeon Studios at Universal Studios Florida.

== Cast ==
- Charlotte Booker as Honey Nielsen
- Stephen C. Bradbury as Lloyd Nielsen
- Julie Benz as Babs Nielsen
- Danny Gura as Chucky Nielsen
- Susan Cella as Elaine Duff
- Peter Benson as Mike Duff
- Eric Kushnick as Sidney "Skunk" Duff

The original unaired pilot featured Dee Hoty as Elaine Duff and AJ McLean as Sidney "Skunk" Duff.

== Episodes ==
=== Season 1 (1991) ===
No. overall	No. in season	Title	Directed by	Written by	Original release date
1	1	"Meet the Nielsens"	Doug Rogers	Rick Mitz & Penny Stallings	July 19, 1991
Mike Duff, a sitcom junkie, finds one of his favorite TV shows Hi Honey, I'm Home has been cancelled, only to discover that the people from the show have just moved next door to him. Honey gets him to promise never to reveal their secret or else they won't be able to go back on the air. Lloyd suddenly springs a dinner on Honey that she wasn't expecting - his boss is coming to dinner! Mike and his mother, Elaine, begins to teach her about modern life. Guest star: Gale Gordon as Theodore J. Mooney from The Lucy Show. Nielsen Ratings: 11.6/24 (13th out of 92), 17.9 million viewers
2	2	"Make My Bed"	Doug Rogers	Rick Mitz & Penny Stallings	July 26, 1991
After a neighbor exposes himself and a robbery experience, Honey goes to a self-defense class with Elaine. Lloyd prefers his gun collection, which actually draws robbers to the house. In classic male form, Lloyd faints, but Elaine and Honey manage to repel the intruders, with Honey daring them to "Go ahead, make my bed!" Guest star: Barbara Billingsley as June Cleaver from Leave It to Beaver. Nielsen Ratings: 11.9/24 (14th out of 92), 17.4 million viewers
3	3	"Fur Flies"	Doug Rogers	Rick Mitz & Penny Stallings	August 2, 1991
Lloyd forces Honey to choose between her marriage to him and her friendship with Elaine, leaving Honey quite depressed and Elaine quite irate. Lloyd gets an unexpected visit from Alice and Trixie, who indicate that he and Elaine have very similar qualities (which explains the marriage and the friendship), that Honey must be friendly with Elaine, and that women are much smarter than Lloyd thinks they are. Honey proves this by becoming Lloyd's temporary duplicate and clone, even handcuffing herself to him. Finally, she decides to "draw the line" and demand that he respect her friendships the same as she's always respected his. Guest stars: Audrey Meadows and Joyce Randolph as Alice Kramden and Trixie Norton from The Honeymooners. Nielsen Ratings: 8.7/18 (41st out of 87), 12.6 million viewers
4	4	"Hi Mom, I'm Not Home"	Doug Rogers	Lee Kalcheim	August 9, 1991
It's Mike's birthday, and Elaine wants to spend it with him, but she has to work too much, so he spends his time with Honey. Elaine feels this is a personal affront, because she and Mike were once best pals. Upon learning how Elaine feels, Honey beseeches help from Gomer Pyle to help give Mike a proper birthday and she also convinces Mike that despite her inordinately busy schedule, Elaine does love him dearly, but that doesn't mean that she can't be friends to him. It was revealed that Mike was the man of the house, due to his father's abandonment, and the modern Elaine prepared her son's dinner from scratch, just like Honey would, and Honey would call Mike "sweetie pie" as an affectionate pet name. Guest star: Jim Nabors as Gomer Pyle from The Andy Griffith Show and Gomer Pyle, U.S.M.C.. Nielsen Ratings: 8.9/18 (44th out of 92), 13.5 million viewers
5	5	"Grey Skies"	Doug Rogers	Suzanne Collins	August 16, 1991
Lloyd's inability to find a job leads to him losing his television personhood and becoming a normal man with a severe case of depression. Elaine convinces Honey to take Lloyd to a therapist. She also gets him hired, but pays his salary until Lloyd overheard her. Then Mike and company try to restore his spirits with a variation of This is your life! that doesn't go well. Lloyd only recovers when he gets a visit from Grandpa (Munster) Dracula. Guest star: Al Lewis as Grandpa (Munster) Dracula from The Munsters. Nielsen Ratings: 9.5/19 (39th out of 90), 14.4 million viewers
6	6	"SRP"	Doug Rogers	Michael Patrick King	August 23, 1991
The Nielsens have a chance to go back on the air, as a timeslot has opened up, but it's on the night before Mike has finally gotten Babs to go out with him. In desperation, he confesses the truth about the Neilsons to Elaine, who discounts him but warns Honey and asks if Mike is around too much. This is a threat to their ability to return to television. Mike later steals the Turner-izer device, and has a nightmare about the consequences and returns it, bidding the team a fond farewell. Honey realizes she can't abandon Mike, who was there for them often (and he had been abandoned before by his own father), so she changes the script - same lines, different scene in color - with herself as a smoker, Babs as a pregnant teenager, Lloyd as a transvestite, and Chucky as a tattooed delinquent. The SRP (sitcom relocation program) representative is not pleased, and gives the slot to the behated Brady Bunch instead. Guest star: Ann B. Davis as Alice Nelson from The Brady Bunch. Nielsen Ratings: 8.3/16 (51st out of 83), 12.5 million viewers

* The original, unaired pilot aired on Nickelodeon on June 27, 1999.

=== Season 2 (1992) ===
No. overall	No. in season	Title	Directed by	Written by	Original release date
7	1	"That Kind of Girl"	Doug Rogers	Tom Leopold	June 6, 1992
The Nielsens learn about sex. Guest star: Shelley Fabares as Mary Stone from The Donna Reed Show.
8	2	"Honey's First Job"	Doug Rogers	Suzanne Collins	June 7, 1992
Honey gets a job as a waitress in a biker bar when money becomes tight. Guest star: Eva Gabor as Lisa Douglas from Green Acres.
9	3	"Take My Son Please"	Doug Rogers	Joan Brooker	June 14, 1992
Skunk desires new Skyhooks shoes, which Elaine won't pay for. Chucky desires to be friends with someone, anyone. So Skunk convinces Chucky to help he and another friend steal from a vacationing neighbor's house in order to get the money for the shoes. Chucky is then left behind and arrested. The Neilsons are angry, and Chucky is punished. He refuses to rat the other thieves out, but Honey suspects Skunk. Elaine is outraged. Later on, she interrogates Skunk herself, but he denies it, but the truth comes out when Elaine and Chucky arrive in the house, and Chucky asks Skunk if they can be friends. Skunk refuses, saying Chucky got caught. Chucky pleads that he was loyal, and didn't expose him, but Skunk is unmoved. In anger, Chucky tells Skunk to kiss his Skyhooks goodbye, and microwaves them. Skunk prepared to attack Chucky, only to have a very angry Elaine put a stop to that. She decides to send him to his father, because she can't control him, but in the end, she foolishly backs down. This does not mean, however, that Skunk and his friend get away without punishment. Guest star: Ken Osmond as Eddie Haskell from Leave It to Beaver.
10	4	"Elaine Takes a Wife"	Doug Rogers	Irene Mecchi	June 21, 1992
Elaine, who keeps asking Honey for favors, feels that Lloyd is taking advantage of Honey's kindness, and convinces Elaine to look at a college catalogue. Mike finds that Babs is doing the same thing to him. A few days later, Mike and Honey, and Georgette Baxter, meet at the same class, "The Doormat Dilemma – say yes to no." Georgette is the teacher, it turns out. She uses the idea of the U. S. S. Minnow and Mike and Honey being stranded. Mike is repairing the ship, while Honey is keeping the place clean, and she finds a sandwich. She gives it to him at first, then offers half to him, but spurred on by Georgette, Honey learns to become more assertive. She can't say no, but Georgette suggests she sing it. Honey can do that, and does so with great gusto. Mike wants the sandwich because he feels he needs his strength, but Honey counters that her work is just as important. In their increasing anger, they shout "Elaine" and "Babs", then refuse to give Georgette back her sandwich. Mike rips up the homework he's been doing for Babs, while Honey sings "No" to Elaine, and forces her to realize that she doesn't respect her fellow woman as much as she thinks she does. Guest star: Georgia Engel as Georgette Franklin Baxter from The Mary Tyler Moore Show.
11	5	"Date From Heck"	Doug Rogers	Rick Mitz & Penny Stallings	June 28, 1992
Honey decides to fix Elaine up with several different men so she won't have to go to a banquet on her own. All of the men are a disaster. In desperation, she rings up an old friend, Don ... "Oh. It's Donna, now?" But at the very end, a man from the environmentalist group "Green Planet" comes to the door to sign petitions. Hyper-liberal Elaine gladly accepts his petition, and his compliments, and thinks he'll make a perfect date for the banquet. Guest star: Rose Marie as Sally Rogers from The Dick Van Dyke Show.
12	6	"Honey Gets Busted"	Doug Rogers	David Potorti	July 5, 1992
While cleaning out her house of junk, Elaine gives a bust clock to Lloyd. He takes it to an appraiser, and finds it to be financially valuable. This causes a feud between the neighbors, and when the clock disappears, they go up to The Persons' Court. There, Honey and Mike reveal that they took the clock because Honey couldn't stand the greed on either side. The judge breaks the clock, and the money is split equally between the families. Guest star: Doug Llewelyn from The People's Court.
13	7	"The Many Loves of Mike Duff"	Doug Rogers	Ned Rice	July 12, 1992
Mike wants to go to the dance with Babs, who still rejects him. He has a friend named Mo who's a mechanic's daughter and has learned the trade well. She likes Mike, and gladly lends him a car to impress Babs, but when Babs betrays him, he and Mo decide to go to the dance. Then he betrays Mo, and ends up alone as both girls go to the dance, Babs with her father and Mo with someone else, looking ladylike for the first time. Guest star: Dwayne Hickman as Dobie Gillis from The Many Loves of Dobie Gillis.
