= Ken Osmond =

American actor and police officer (1943–2020)

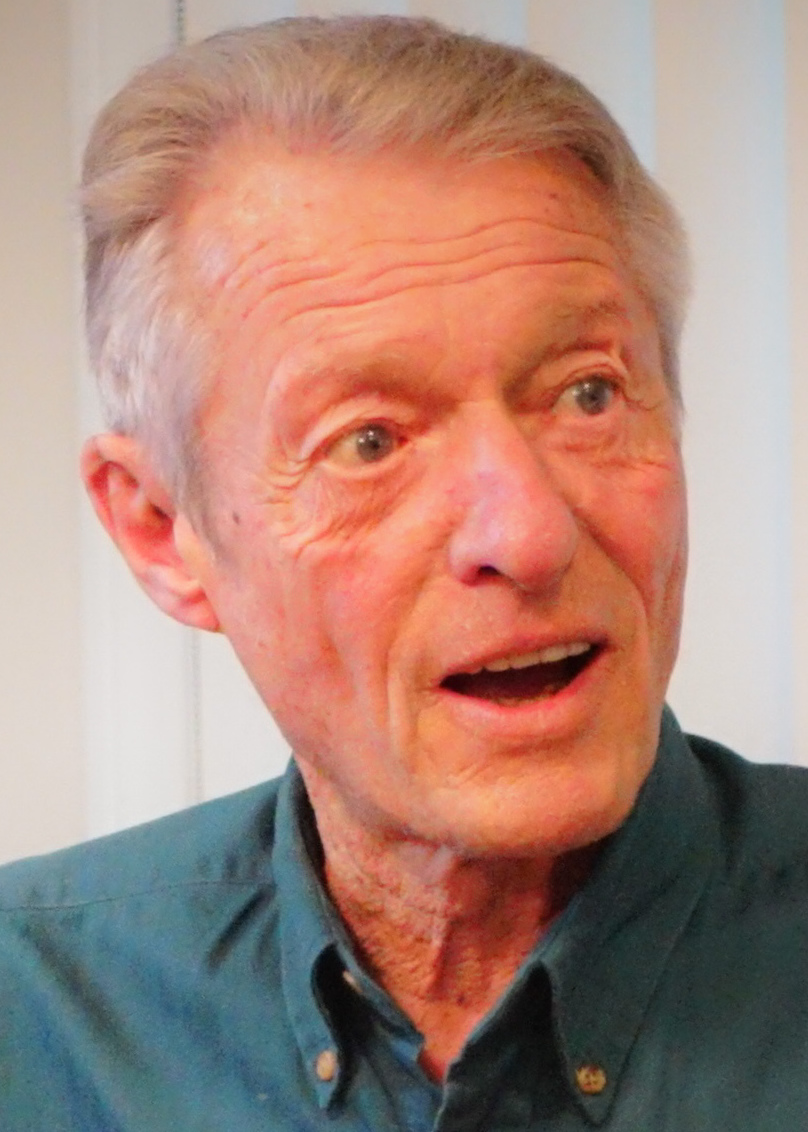
- Osmond in 2014
- Born: Kenneth Charles Osmond; June 7, 1943; Glendale, California, U.S.
- Died: May 18, 2020 (aged 76); Los Angeles, California, U.S.
- Occupations: Actor, police officer
- Years active: 1952–2016 (actor); 1970–1988 (police officer)
- Spouse: Sandra Purdy (m. 1969)
- Children: 2

Kenneth Charles Osmond (June 7, 1943 – May 18, 2020) was an American actor and police officer. Beginning a career as a child actor at the age of four, Osmond played the role of Eddie Haskell on the late 1950s to early 1960s television situation comedy Leave It to Beaver and reprised it on the 1980s revival series The New Leave It to Beaver. Typecast by the role, he found it hard to get other acting work and became a Los Angeles police officer. After retiring from police work, he resumed his acting career.

== Early life ==
Osmond was born in Glendale, California, the son of Pearl (née Hand) and Thurman Osmond. His father was a carpenter and propmaker and his mother, whom he described as "a typical movie mother," had ambitions to get him and his brother, Dayton, into acting. Osmond began going on professional auditions at the age of four, and began working in commercials. His mother took her sons to acting classes every day after school; he eventually studied dance, drama, diction, dialects, martial arts, and equestrian riding.

== Career ==
=== Early years ===
Osmond began in feature films working as an extra. The first he remembered was an appearance in the film Plymouth Adventure with Spencer Tracy and Gene Tierney. He had his first speaking part at age 9, a small role in the film So Big starring Jane Wyman and Sterling Hayden.

He continued to appear in small roles in feature films such as Good Morning Miss Dove, and Everything But the Truth, and made numerous guest-starring appearances on television series, including Lassie, The Adventures of Ozzie and Harriet, Wagon Train, Fury, Circus Boy, and The Loretta Young Show. He also appeared in 1958 on the series Official Detective as Henry in the episode "The Deserted House".

In 1959, Osmond played 16-year-old "Tommy" in the episode "Dead Aim" of the ABC/Warner Brothers western series Colt .45, starring Wayde Preston. John Doucette was cast as the bounty hunter Lou Gore, and Bing Russell portrayed Jed Coy in the episode.

Osmond made a guest appearance, in 1964, on Petticoat Junction (S1, Ep38). He was in the episode "The Genghis Keane Story", as Harold Boggs.

=== Leave It to Beaver ===
In the fall of 1957, 14-year-old Osmond was called into a typical "cattle call" audition to read for the role for which he became most identified, that of Wally Cleaver's best (and worst) friend, Eddie Haskell, on the family sitcom Leave It to Beaver. After a series of call-backs to narrow down the field, Osmond eventually landed the role. The character of Eddie was originally intended to be a "one shot" guest appearance, but those involved with the show were impressed with Osmond's portrayal, and Eddie Haskell eventually became a memorable character on the series throughout its entire six-season run. He appeared in 97 of the series' 235 episodes.

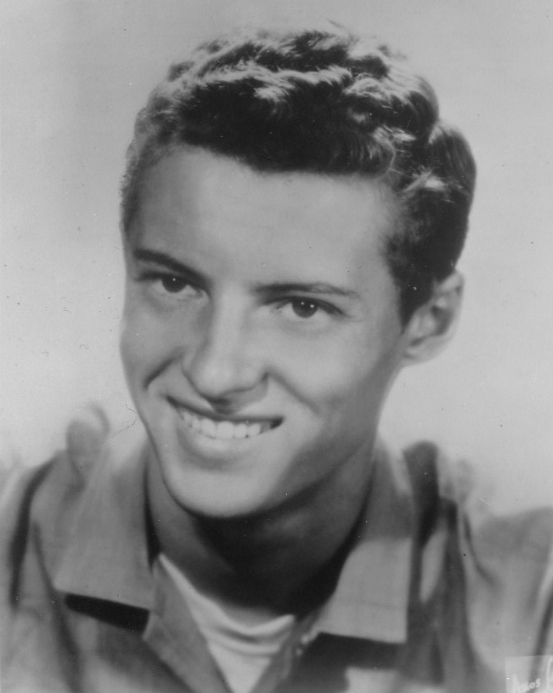
Osmond, c. 1962

Osmond's portrayal of Eddie Haskell became a cultural reference and archetype for the "behind-your-back" rebel. Teenager Eddie Haskell was polite and obsequious to grownups, but derided adults' social conventions behind their backs. He was constantly trying to involve his friends in activities that would get them into trouble. Parents like Ward and June Cleaver hoped Eddie wouldn't be a model to their children but rather someone to point out as an example of what not to do. Even today, the term "Eddie Haskell" is known to refer to an insincere flatterer or a sycophant.

During the final years of the show, Osmond was in the U.S. Army Reserve as an armorer and was granted leave to film episodes in return for personal appearances for the Army's Special Services.

=== Typecast ===
After Leave It to Beaver ended in 1963, Osmond continued to make occasional appearances on such television series as CBS's Petticoat Junction, The Munsters, and a final return appearance on Lassie in the episode "A Matter of Seconds" (1967) as a motorcycle delivery man who offers the hitchhiking collie a lift in his sidecar. He was cast in the feature films C'mon Let's Live a Little (1967) and With Six You Get Eggroll (1968). However, he found himself typecast as Eddie Haskell and had difficulty finding steady work. In 2008, Osmond told radio host Stu Shostak in a radio interview, "I was very much typecast. It's a death sentence. In Hollywood you get typecast. I'm not complaining because Eddie's been too good to me, but I found work hard to come by. In 1968, I bought my first house, in '69 I got married, and we were going to start a family and I needed a job, so I went out and signed up for the LAPD."

=== Law enforcement ===
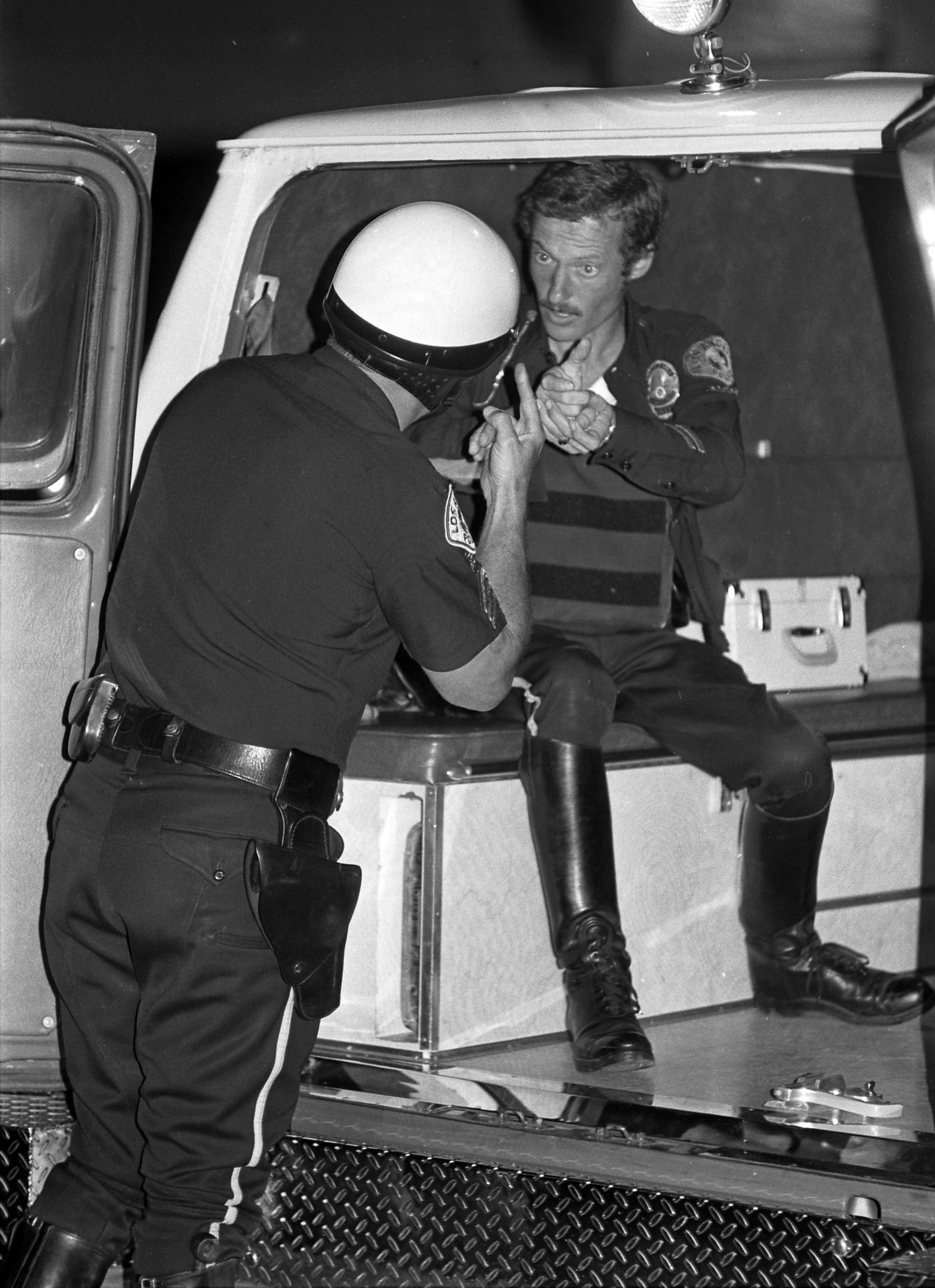
Osmond during his time in the LAPD, after he survived a shooting

In 1970, Osmond joined the Los Angeles Police Department (LAPD) and grew a mustache in an effort to remain relatively anonymous among citizens, though not among his co-workers. He worked as a motorcycle officer.

On September 20, 1980, Osmond was struck by three bullets while in a foot chase with a suspected car thief. He was protected from two of the bullets by his bullet-resistant vest, with the third bullet ricocheting off his belt buckle. The shooting was later dramatized in a November 1992 episode of the CBS series Top Cops. Osmond applied for a disability pension in 1984, but after an evidentiary hearing in 1986, the Los Angeles Board of Pension Commissioners denied his request by a 4–2 vote. Osmond appealed the determination to the Superior Court and in 1988 a judge overturned the Board's denial and awarded Osmond a lifetime pension, and he retired from the force.

=== Return to acting ===
In 1983, Osmond appeared as a game show participant and celebrity guest star on the Match Game-Hollywood Squares Hour, along with Beaver co-stars Jerry Mathers, Richard Deacon and Jeri Weil. Osmond returned to acting in 1983 reprising his role as Eddie Haskell in the CBS made-for-television movie Still the Beaver, which followed the adult Cleaver boys, their friends, and their families. The television movie was a success and led to the revival comedy series The New Leave It to Beaver, which premiered the following year. The show ran for four seasons from 1984 to 1989, starting on The Disney Channel, and later moving to WTBS. On the show, Osmond played Eddie Haskell as a husband and father, while his character's two sons, Freddie Haskell and Edward "Bomber" Haskell Jr., were played by Osmond's two real-life sons, Eric Osmond and Christian Osmond.

In 1987, Osmond was honored by the Young Artist Foundation with its Former Child Star "Lifetime Achievement" Award for his role as Eddie Haskell. He continued to make television appearances throughout the 1980s and 1990s on the shows Happy Days and Rags to Riches, and the television movie High School U.S.A., as well as cameo appearances as Eddie Haskell on such television shows as Parker Lewis Can't Lose and Hi Honey, I'm Home!. In the 1997 feature film Leave It to Beaver, Osmond played Eddie Haskell Sr., and Adam Zolotin played his son Eddie Haskell Jr. He also had a bit part in the 2016 indie movie Characterz.

== Personal life ==
In 1969, Osmond married Sandra Purdy. They had two sons, Eric E. Osmond and Christian S. Osmond. Following his retirement from the police force, Osmond handled rental properties in Los Angeles County and made occasional personal appearances at film festivals, collectors' shows, and nostalgia conventions.

On September 18, 2007, Osmond filed a class action lawsuit against the Screen Actors Guild, alleging that SAG had collected $8 million in foreign residuals for U.S. actors but had not distributed them to the actors. SAG settled the lawsuit in 2010, providing $7.9 million in royalties to actors.

Osmond was the co-author, along with Christopher J. Lynch, of the book Eddie: The Life and Times of America's Preeminent Bad Boy, which was published in September 2014. The foreword was written by Jerry Mathers.

== Death ==
Osmond died at his home in Los Angeles on May 18, 2020, at age 76, from complications of chronic obstructive pulmonary disease (COPD) and peripheral artery disease. News of his death was first announced by his son Eric in a statement through Osmond's representative.

== Urban legends ==
In the early 1970s, a story was widely reported that Osmond had become rock star Alice Cooper. According to Cooper, the rumor began when a college newspaper editor asked him what kind of kid he was, to which Cooper replied, "I was obnoxious, disgusting, a real Eddie Haskell." However, the story ended up reporting that Cooper was the real Eddie Haskell. Cooper would later tell the New Times, "It was the biggest rumor that ever came out about me. Finally, I got a T-shirt that said 'No, I am not Eddie Haskell.' But people still believed it."

Another widely reported urban legend of the 1970s was that Osmond had grown up to become adult film star John Holmes. The story apparently began when fan magazines falsely reported that Osmond had embarked on such a career. The rumor was dispelled when a Los Angeles movie theater lit up its marquee advertising "Eddie Haskell of TV in 'Behind the Green Door' – X-rated", prompting Osmond himself, then an LAPD officer, to go to the theater to request that the manager remove his character's name from the marquee. Osmond testified at his disability hearing in 1986 that in 1971 he was called into LAPD Internal Affairs and asked to disrobe to prove he was not John Holmes.

In the early 1980s, Osmond sued an adult bookstore in Los Angeles called Le Sex Shoppe, which was selling an adult video starring Holmes. The video advertised that the film featured "'Little Eddie Haskell' from 'Leave it to Beaver.'" Osmond claimed that the film's advertising defamed him, but the trial court dismissed the case and Osmond appealed to the California Court of Appeals, which also ruled against him, stating that there was no evidence that the owner of the bookstore was aware of the defamatory language on the packaging and therefore had not acted with "malice" in selling the video.

== Filmography ==
=== Films ===
- Plymouth Adventure (1952) – Child on Mayflower (uncredited)
- So Big (1953) – Young Eugene (uncredited)
- Good Morning, Miss Dove (1955) – Tommy Baker – Age 9 (uncredited)
- Everything But the Truth (1956) – Oren Cunningham (uncredited)
- C'mon, Let's Live a Little (1967) – The Beard
- With Six You Get Eggroll (1968) – Duke (uncredited)
- High School U.S.A. (1983) - Baxter Franklin
- Dead Women in Lingerie (1991) – David
- Leave It to Beaver (1997) – Eddie Sr.
- Desperation Boulevard (1998) – Himself
- Characterz (2016) – Daniel (final film role)

=== TV ===
- Screen Directors Playhouse (1 episode, 1955) – Henry Raglund
- Lassie (2 episodes, 1955–1967) – Motorcyclist / Ralph / Delivery Boy
- Annie Oakley (1 episode, 1956) – Scotty
- Circus Boy (1 episode, 1956) – Skinny
- Fury (1956–1957) – Kenny / Johnny
- Letter to Loretta (1 episode, 1957) – Peter
- The Walter Winchell File (1 episode, 1957) – Joel Marisch
- Official Detective (1 episode, 1957) – Henry (uncredited)
- Telephone Time (1 episode, 1957) – Charlie Sharp
- Colt .45 (1 episode, 1957) – Tommy
- The Jack Benny Program (1 episode, 1957) – Newspaper Boy
- Leave It to Beaver (1957–1963) – Eddie Haskell
- Wagon Train (1 episode, 1958) – Tommy Jenkins
- Petticoat Junction (Season 1/Episode 38; 1964) – Harold Boggs
- The Munsters (1 episode; 1966) – John
- Still the Beaver (1983, TV Movie) – Eddie Haskell
- Happy Days (1 episode; 1983) – Freddie Bascomb
- High School U.S.A. (1984, TV Movie) – Baxter Franklin
- Rags to Riches (1 episode; 1983)
- Parker Lewis Can't Lose (1 episode; 1991) – Eddie Haskell
- Hi Honey, I'm Home (1 episode; 1992) – Eddie Haskell
