= Fred Rutherford =

- Richard Deacon as Fred Rutherford.
- First appearance: "The Black Eye" (October 18, 1957)
- Last appearance: "Wally's Practical Joke" (May 23, 1963) (A year before his death, Deacon reprised the character again in the 1983 reunion TV-movie Still the Beaver).
- Portrayed by: Richard Deacon

In-universe information
- Gender: Male
- Occupation: accountant
- Spouse: Gwendolyn (Geraldine, first season) Rutherford (wife)
- Children: Clarence "Lumpy" Rutherford (son); Unknown (son); Violet Rutherford (daughter)

Frederick "Fred" Rutherford is a fictional character in the television sitcom Leave It to Beaver. The show aired October 4, 1957 to June 20, 1963. Fred is portrayed by Richard Deacon. Alan Rachins played the character in the 1997 film adaptation of the series, Leave It to Beaver.

== Overview ==
Fred is the head of the "Rancho Rutherford" household and is married to Geraldine/Gwendolyn. He is balding, and self-aggrandizing, the father of a son named Clarence (nicknamed "Lumpy" by everyone in town), played by Frank Bank, and a daughter named Violet, played by Wendy Winkelman and later by Veronica Cartwright. Fred in public considers Clarence a model son, boasting about him and defending him whenever he is blamed for troublesome activities. He is shocked if "his boy" misbehaves. Privately, however, Fred calls his son a "big boob." Clarence initially bullies both Wally and Beaver but eventually becomes one of Wally's pals. In the show's third episode, "The Black Eye", Fred brags about two older (un-named, and never seen) sons, both nominated for football scholarships.

Fred is Ward's suit-wearing office co-worker and friend. He often gets on Ward's nerves, but the patient Ward, played by Hugh Beaumont, usually tolerates Fred well. Fred often addresses Ward as "Ward, old man"; Ward is thirteen years older than Fred. The two work for a "big company" with the home office in New York City. Fred drops by the Cleaver house occasionally on either work matters or social calls. If trouble brews between the Cleaver and Rutherford children, Fred either makes a phone call or appears at the Cleaver's door to advise Ward; and, usually implies the Cleaver kids are likely at fault. In one episode, the Cleavers have the Rutherfords in for cards. Fred plays golf at a local country club, sometimes accompanied by a reluctant Ward.

In the pilot episode "It's a Small World", Richard Deacon plays a character named "Mr. Baxter", an employee for the "Franklin Milk Co."

Beginning in Leave It To Beaver's fifth season which launched in September 1961, Fred Rutherford began appearing less often in episodes because Richard Deacon began appearing as a regular on The Dick Van Dyke Show. He reprised the role in the 1983 reunion television movie, Still the Beaver, but Deacon died shortly before the spinoff television series The New Leave It to Beaver began filming in 1984. His character had already been written into two early scripts for the revival series with a fairly large role, so the producers chose to recast the role with actor Larry D. Mann.
