= Jeff Hayenga =

American actor (born 1950)

- Born: Jeffrey Hayenga; 1950 (age 75–76); Sibley, Iowa, U.S.
- Education: University of Minnesota
- Occupation: Actor

Jeffrey "Jeff" Hayenga (born 1950) is an American actor, writer, and producer known for his role in Star Trek: The Next Generation.

== Early life and education ==
Hayenga was born in Sibley, Iowa. He received his training at the University of Minnesota.

== Career ==
He has appeared in a number of films, including And the Band Played On (1993), Other People's Money (1991), The Prince of Pennsylvania, Center Stage (2000), and Memro (2004).

His New York theater credits include title roles in Broadway's The Elephant Man, and off-Broadway's Jeffrey, as well as The Man Who Came to Dinner, Ah Wilderness, As Bees In Honey Drown, Sister Mary Ignatius Explains It All For You, Jeffrey, Two Rooms, Hamlet, King Lear and The Book of Wren, to name just a few.

Hayenga made two guest appearances in the Star Trek spin-off series.

== Filmography ==
=== Acting ===
==== Film ====
| Year | Title | Role | Notes |
|---|---|---|---|
| 1988 | The Prince of Pennsylvania | Jack Sike | |
| 1991 | The Unborn | Brad Marshall | |
| 1991 | Other People's Money | Klein | |
| 1995 | Animal Room | Shelly's Dad | |
| 2000 | Center Stage | ABA Scout | |

==== Television ====
| Year | Title | Role | Notes |
|---|---|---|---|
| 1986 | George Washington II: The Forging of a Nation | Philip Freneau | Television film |
| 1988 | As the World Turns | Colin Crowley | Episode dated January 22, 1988 |
| 1990 | In the Heat of the Night | Off. Brian Kasch | 2 episodes |
| 1990 | The Fresh Prince of Bel-Air | Waiter | Episode: "Not with My Pig, You Don't" |
| 1991 | Star Trek: The Next Generation | Orta | Episode: "Ensign Ro" |
| 1992 | Matlock | Kevin Maitland | Episode: "The Big Payoff" |
| 1992 | A Woman Scorned: The Betty Broderick Story | Judge | Television film |
| 1993 | Silk Stalkings | Alex Weston | Episode: "Jasmine" |
| 1993 | Bodies of Evidence | Ted Miller | Episode: "Eleven Grains of Sand" |
| 1993 | Star Trek: Deep Space Nine | Orta | 2 episodes (photos only) |
| 1993 | And the Band Played On | Bruce Voeller | Television film |
| 1996 | New York Undercover | Dr. Jarsky | Episode: "The Enforcers" |
| 1999 | Law & Order | Gardner Keith | Episode: "Sideshow" |
| 2000 | The Man Who Came to Dinner | John | Television film |
| 2002 | Law & Order: Criminal Intent | Wharton Carlyle | Episode: "The Insider" |
| 2003 | Star Trek: Enterprise | Dr. Yuris | Episode: "Stigma" |
| 2004 | Memron | Bruce Corning | Television film; also associate producer |
| 2005 | JAG | Professor Walter Richardson | Episode: "The Sixth Juror" |
| 2005 | Jack & Bobby | Timothy Swain | Episode: "And Justice for All" |
| 2009 | Guiding Light | Brooks | 2 episodes |
| 2014 | Bones | Dr. Herman Kessler | Episode: "The Nail in the Coffin" |
| 2016 | The Blacklist | Doctor | Episode: "Dr. Adrian Shaw (No. 98): Conclusion" |

=== Writing ===
==== Television ====
| Year | Title | Notes |
|---|---|---|
| 1986 | Search for Tomorrow | 2 episodes |
| 1987 | Another World | 2 episodes |
