= Joyce Randolph =

American actress (1924–2024)

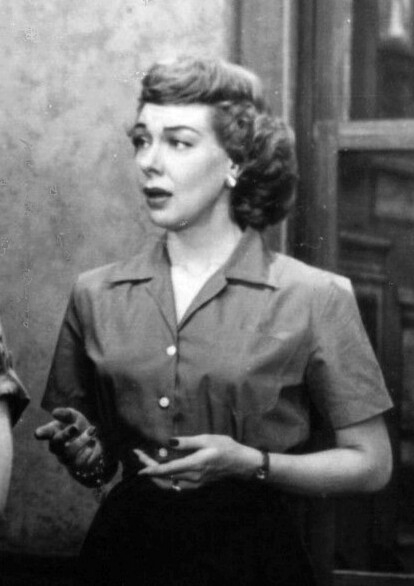
- Randolph in The Honeymooners (1955)
- Born: Joyce Sirola; October 21, 1924; Detroit, Michigan, U.S.
- Died: January 13, 2024 (aged 99); New York City, New York, U.S.
- Occupation: Actress
- Years active: 1943–2000
- Spouse: Richard Lincoln Charles (m. 1955; died 1997)
- Children: 1
- Relatives: Tim Redding (grandnephew)

Signature
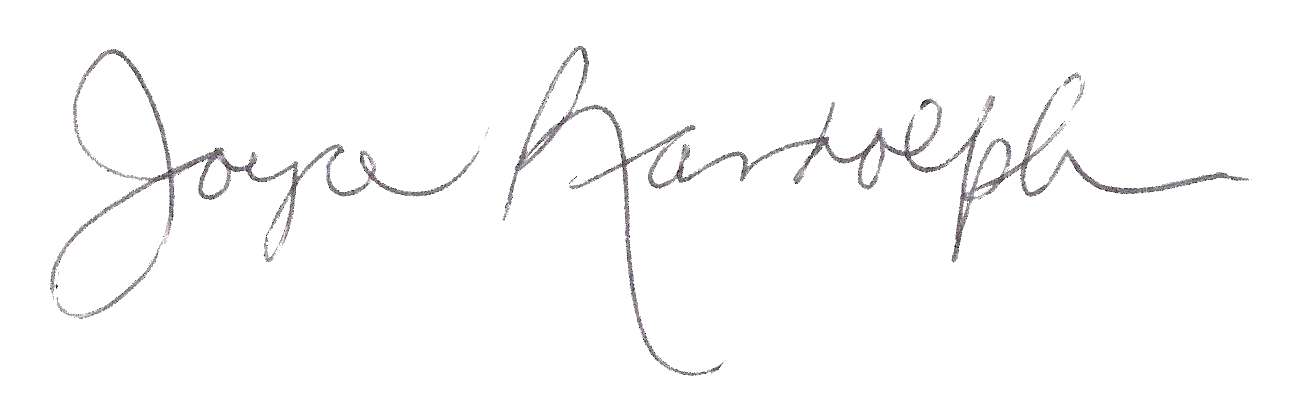

Joyce Randolph (née Sirola; October 21, 1924 – January 13, 2024) was an American actress of stage and television, best known for playing Trixie Norton on The Jackie Gleason Show and the television sitcom The Honeymooners, being the last surviving member of the cast.

== Early life and career ==
Randolph was born in Detroit on October 21, 1924, and was of Finnish descent. As a teenager, she acted with the Wayne University Workshop. After she finished high school, she began working in retail sales for a Saks Fifth Avenue store in Detroit. When a touring company of Stage Door played in Detroit, she auditioned, got a part, and performed for the rest of the tour. She moved to New York City in 1943 to pursue an acting career. She took roles on Broadway and landed various television roles.

In 1951, she was seen in a Clorets commercial by Jackie Gleason and was asked to appear in a skit on Cavalcade of Stars, Gleason's variety show on the DuMont Television Network. Soon after, she was cast as Trixie in The Honeymooners. Several New York columnists referred to her as the "Garbo of Detroit". "That's still a mystery ... I was a nobody in Detroit. Why Garbo? Well, she was Scandinavian—and so was I", responded Randolph.

== The Honeymooners ==
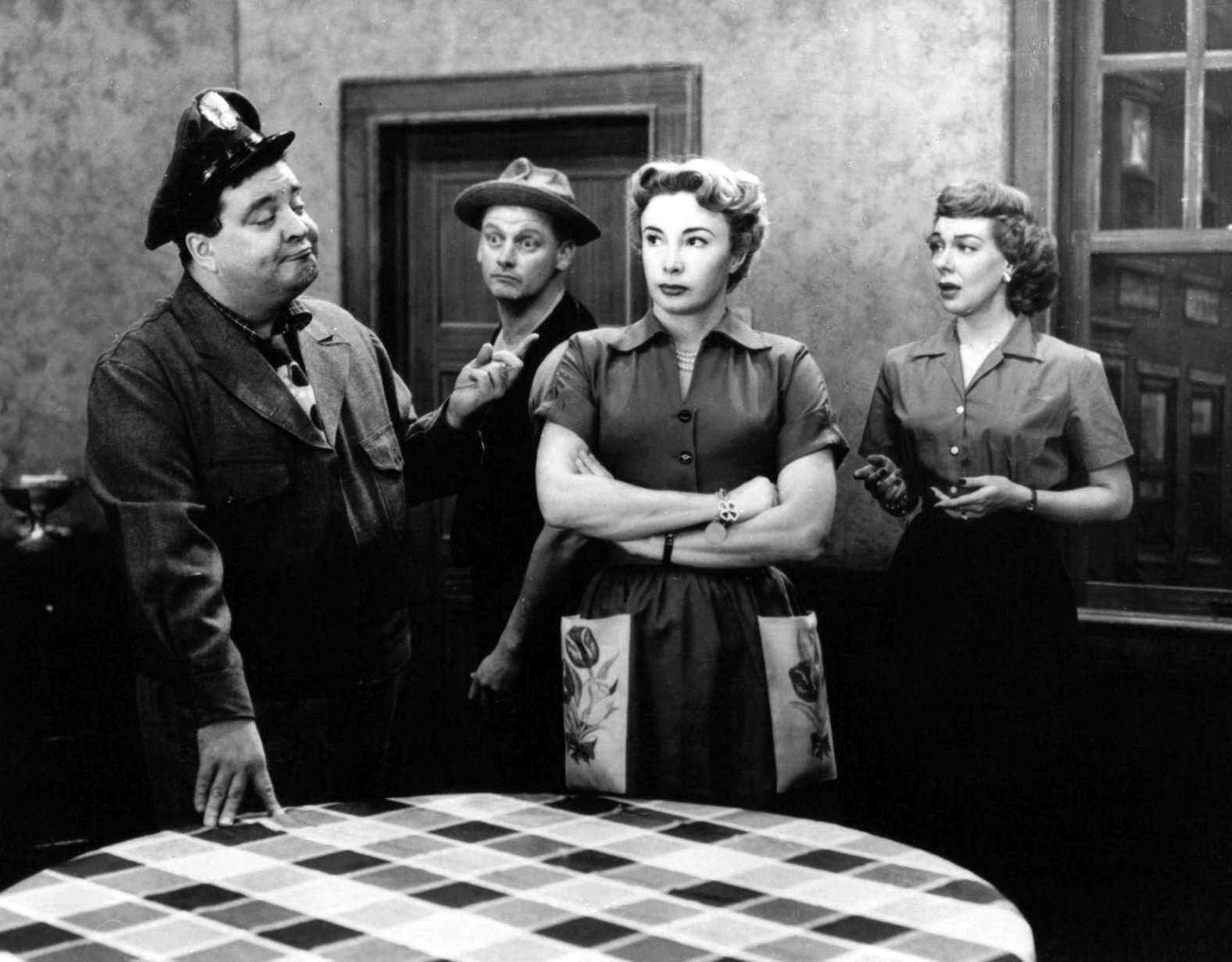
Cast of The Honeymooners in 1955; Jackie Gleason as Ralph Kramden, Art Carney as Ed Norton, Audrey Meadows as Alice Kramden and Joyce Randolph as Trixie Norton

Randolph originally portrayed Trixie in skits on The Jackie Gleason Show and The Honeymooners, which included Jackie Gleason as Ralph Kramden, Art Carney as Ed Norton, Audrey Meadows as Alice Kramden, and Randolph as Thelma "Trixie" Norton. In a September 2015 interview, Randolph said that she did not portray Trixie Norton in Honeymooners revivals due to personal and geographic reasons; in addition, Randolph stated that Gleason considered her to be "the quintessential Trixie."

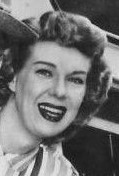
Randolph in 1955

Randolph said that asking Gleason to give her more lines was out of the question. "You don't even talk to Jackie, let alone ask for anything," Randolph said. "He didn't talk much, and he didn't like to rehearse much." Randolph talked about a hectic workload for filming the show, with getting all 39 episodes shot within a calendar year. Though she stated there was not much conversation among cast members, everyone showed up on Saturdays to film the show in front of a live studio audience.

== Other stage and TV roles ==
On Broadway, Randolph appeared in Ladies Night in a Turkish Bath (1950). Randolph was typecast after leaving The Jackie Gleason Show and seldom found other acting roles. "For years after that role," Randolph said, "directors would say: 'No, we can't use her. She's too well known as Trixie.'" She performed in summer stock musicals, made commercials, and had a few guest appearances on television shows, including her reprisal of Trixie Norton (along with Audrey Meadows reprising her role as Alice Kramden) in the 1991 episode "Fur Flies" in Hi Honey, I'm Home!.

== Personal life ==
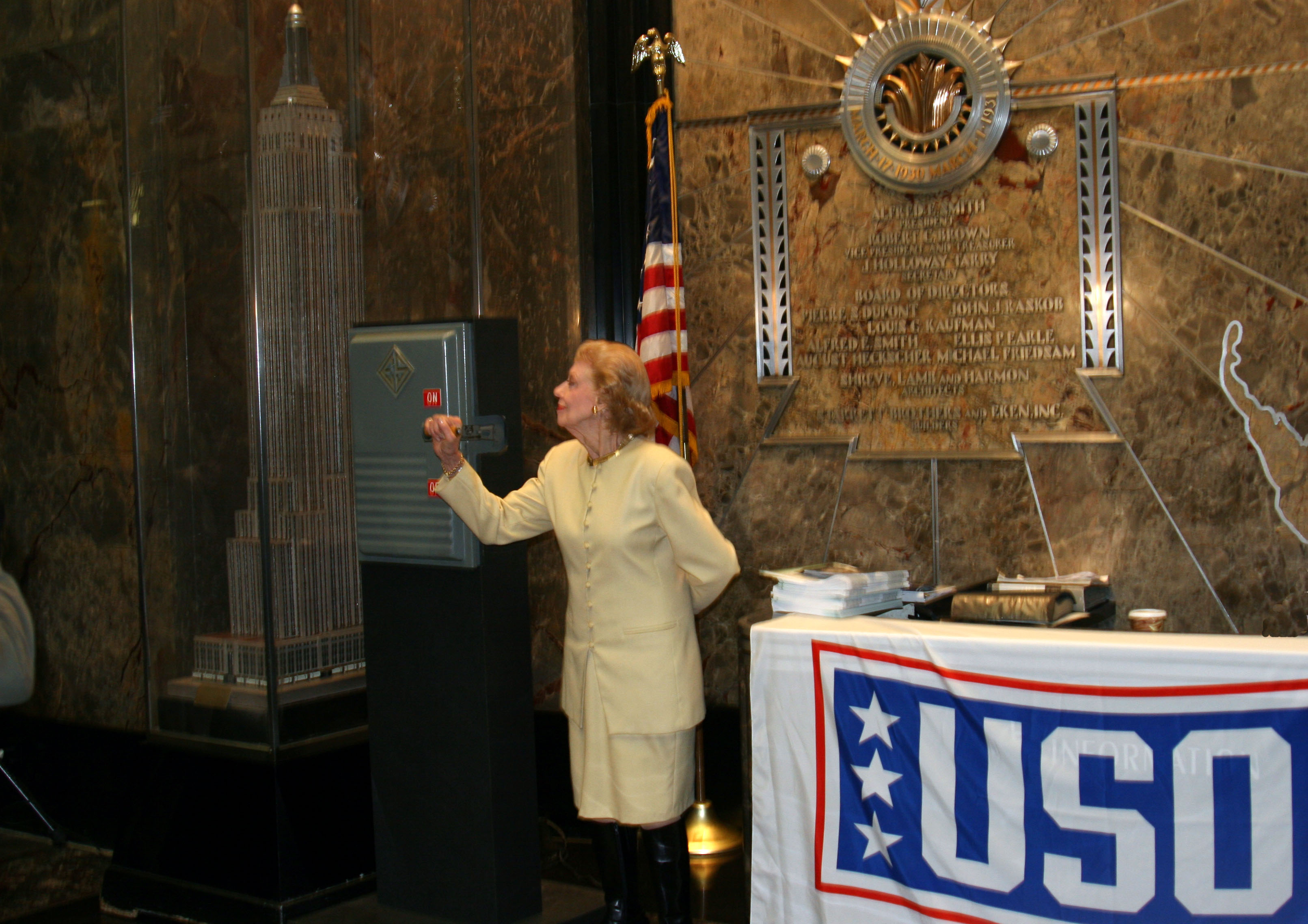
Randolph in 2006

Joyce married Richard Lincoln Charles in 1955 and together they had a son, Randolph Richard Charles, who pursued a career in marketing. Randolph and Charles stayed married until his death in 1997. Randolph was the grand-aunt of former Major League Baseball pitcher Tim Redding.

== Death ==
Randolph was the last surviving cast member of The Honeymooners. She died of natural causes at age 99 at home in Manhattan's Upper West Side on January 13, 2024.

== Filmography ==
Year	Title	Role	Notes
1952–1957	The Jackie Gleason Show	Thelma "Trixie" Norton	
1955–1956	The Honeymooners	Thelma "Trixie" Norton	
1991	Hi Honey, I'm Home!	Thelma "Trixie" Norton	
