= The Unborn (1991 film) =

1991 horror film

- Video release poster
- Directed by: Rodman Flender
- Written by: John Brancato and Michael Ferris (as "Henry Dominic")
- Produced by: Roger Corman (uncredited); Rodman Flender
- Starring: Brooke Adams; Jeff Hayenga; James Karen; K Callan; Jane Cameron
- Cinematography: Wally Pfister
- Music by: Gary Numan; Michael R. Smith
- Production company: Concorde-New Horizons
- Distributed by: Califilm
- Release date: March 29, 1991
- Country: United States
- Language: English
- Box office: $1,159,578

The Unborn is a 1991 American science fiction horror film directed by Rodman Flender and starring Brooke Adams, Jeff Hayenga, James Karen, K Callan, and Jane Cameron. The film's plot concerns a couple who cannot have children; they attempt in-vitro fertilization, but strange things start happening to the mother while she is pregnant.

Lisa Kudrow and Kathy Griffin have small roles.

== Plot ==
The story centers around a married couple. The infertile wife Virginia (Brooke Adams) and her husband Brad Marshall (Jeff Hayenga) decide to join an experimental in-vitro fertilization program developed by Dr. Richard Meyerling (James Karen). The trial succeeds, but during the pregnancy Virginia finds that something unusual is happening to the fetus. A further investigation shows that she is part of an experiment conducted by an insane doctor.

== Cast ==
- Brooke Adams as Virginia Marshall
- Jeff Hayenga as Brad Marshall
- James Karen as Dr. Richard Meyerling
- K Callan as Martha Wellington
- Kathy Griffin as Connie
- Angelina Estrada as Isabel
- Jonathan Emerson as Mark Robinson
- Janice Kent as Cindy
- Lisa Kudrow as Louisa

== Production ==
Writer John D Brancato says the film was inspired by "killer mutant baby stories like It's Alive". They had previously written Bloodfist II for Corman.

Filming took place in October 1990. It was the first film directed by Flender who described it as a cross between Rosemary's Baby and The Fly.

It was the first feature film as cinematographer for Wally Pfister who worked for Roger Corman for a number of years. He later recalled, "I had something I wanted to try with color and light. But it’s ghastly. At the same time, I cut myself slack, because my creative reach went beyond my skill level. That’s a really important thing to note. I had great ideas. But if you don’t have the skill level, you’re never going to master the artistry. That’s where I was early on. And I needed to put the hard work in and slowly work my way up."

Adams said the film was a "pleasant surprise" for her and at one stage discussed with Corman the possibility of directing the sequel.

== Reception ==
Kevin Thomas of the Los Angeles Times called the film "an efficient, scary sci-fi thriller", commending its screenplay as well as Adams's character and performance; he concluded that the film "is laudable adult entertainment on all counts except one: There is a gratuitous, sneering put-down of lesbians who are in turn ignorantly stereotyped as man-haters." Joan Bunke of The Des Moines Register gave the film a score of one out of five stars, calling it "as predictable as the phases of the moon", and writing: "Flender's movie, clearly made on a low budget, looks underdressed and underlit – as cheap as its story framework."

== Sequel ==
The film was followed by a sequel, The Unborn 2, released in 1994.
