= The New Leave It to Beaver =

American television series

- The New Leave It to Beaver cast photo. (Top row; left to right) Ken Osmond, Jerry Mathers, Janice Kent, Tony Dow. (Center row; left to right) Eric Osmond, Kipp Marcus, Barbara Billingsley, Kaleena Kiff. (Bottom row; front) John Snee
- Also known as: Still the Beaver
- Genre: Sitcom
- Based on: Leave It to Beaver by Joe Connelly; Bob Mosher
- Developed by: Brian Levant
- Directed by: Nick Abdo; Bob Claver; Roger Duchowny; Jeffrey Ganz; Steven Hilliard Stern
- Starring: Barbara Billingsley; Tony Dow; Jerry Mathers; Ken Osmond; Frank Bank
- Theme music composer: Walter Murphy
- Composer: David Frank
- Country of origin: United States
- Original language: English
- No. of seasons: 4
- No. of episodes: 101 (+ 4-part television movie)

Production
- Executive producers: Nick Abdo; Brian Levant
- Producers: Al Aidekman; Cindy Begel; Fred Fox Jr. Lesa Kite; Peter Ware
- Editor: Gael Chandler
- Running time: 22–24 minutes
- Production companies: Sprocket Films (season 1); Telvan Productions; Universal Pay Television (season 1); Universal Television (seasons 2–4)

Original release
- Network: The Disney Channel (season 1); TBS (seasons 2–4)
- Release: March 19, 1983 – June 4, 1989

Related
- Leave It to Beaver; Still the Beaver

The New Leave It to Beaver (also known as Still the Beaver) is an American sitcom sequel to the original 1957–1963 sitcom Leave It to Beaver. The series began with the 1983 reunion television movie Still the Beaver that aired on CBS in March 1983. The success of the television movie prompted the creation of a revival series, also titled Still the Beaver, that aired on The Disney Channel from 1984 to 1985. In 1986, the series was picked up by TBS, where it aired until June 1989.

== Synopsis ==
The series focuses on Wally Cleaver (Tony Dow) and his younger brother, Theodore "Beaver" Cleaver (Jerry Mathers) as adults and with families. Beaver is divorced and living with his mother, the widowed June Cleaver (Barbara Billingsley); and his two sons, Kip and Oliver. Wally Cleaver lives next door with his wife Mary Ellen, his daughter Kelly and later in the show, his son Kevin. Hugh Beaumont, who played Ward Cleaver in the original series, had died in 1982, a year prior to the premiere of the television movie. His character, Ward, died in 1977. The film is dedicated in Beaumont's memory.

Other series regulars included Wally's old friend Eddie Haskell (Ken Osmond), his wife Gert (Ellen Maxted) and their sons Freddie and Bomber (played by Osmond's two real-life sons Eric and Christian), as well as "Lumpy" Rutherford (Frank Bank) and his daughter J.J., with Diane Brewster returning for four episodes to recreate her role as "Miss Canfield," Beaver's original grade school teacher. Some of Beaver's old friends, Larry Mondello (Rusty Stevens), and Richard Rickover (Rich Correll), return to the series. Beaver's old nemesis Judy Hensler (Jeri Weil) appears in Episode 52, after her son Billy Benton (Danny Gellis) bullies Oliver. Richard Deacon also returned as Fred Rutherford in the pilot movie.

== Cast ==
- Barbara Billingsley as June Cleaver
- Tony Dow as Wally Cleaver
- Jerry Mathers as Theodore "Beaver" Cleaver
- Ken Osmond as Eddie Haskell
- Frank Bank as Clarence "Lumpy" Rutherford
- Kipp Marcus as Kip Cleaver
- John Snee as Oliver “Ollie” Cleaver
- Kaleena Kiff as Kelly Cleaver
- Troy Davidson as Kevin Cleaver (seasons 3–4)
- Eric Osmond as Freddie Haskell
- Janice Kent as Mary Ellen Cleaver (née Rogers)
- Ellen Maxted as Gertrude "Gert" Haskell (recurring)
- Christian Osmond as Edward “Bomber" Haskell Jr. (recurring)
- Keri Houlihan as J.J. Rutherford (recurring)
- Giovanni Ribisi as Duffy Guthrie (recurring)

== Episodes ==
=== Still the Beaver ===
==== Television movie/repackaged as pilot ====
Still the Beaver, a two-hour CBS television movie, aired on March 19, 1983.

No.	Title	Directed by	Written by	Original release date
TV movie & "Pilot Specials"	"Still the Beaver"	Steven H. Stern	Story by : Brian Levant & Nick Abdo; Teleplay by : Brian Levant	March 19, 1983
Beaver’s anxiety over the failure of his marriage to Kimberly, and termination from his father-in-law’s company, prompts him to return to his boyhood home. Determined to win custody of his sons, Corey and Oliver, he goes to work for Mr. Rutherford. When Kimberly gets accepted at a university in Italy, she relinquishes custody of the boys, but Beaver worries that he will prove inept at parenting. His frustration turns to panic when Corey and Oliver run away after a mild punishment. Mary Ellen and Wally learn that she is pregnant.

In addition to the cast of a sequel series, the television movie featured:

- Richard Deacon as Fred Rutherford, the Beaver's new employer
  - reprising his role as Ward Cleaver's co-worker in the original series
- Ed Begley Jr. as Hubert "Whitey" Whitney, the Beaver's childhood friend
  - in the original series, Whitey was played by Stanley Fafara
- Corey Feldman as Corey Cleaver, the Beaver's older son
  - in the new series, this character became Kip, played by Kipp Marcus
- Joanna Gleason as Kimberly, the soon to be ex-wife of the Beaver
- Tiger Fafara as Tooey Brown, Wally's childhood friend
  - credited as Luke Fafara, reprising his role from the original series
- Diane Brewster as Miss Canfield, Beaver's second-grade teacher, now the principal of Grant Avenue School

The film was dedicated in memory of Hugh Beaumont. Its original airing easily won its Saturday night timeslot, and ranked 19th out of 66 programs airing that week, bringing in an 18.9 rating and a 33 share.

The first season, which aired on The Disney Channel, used the television movie’s title, Still the Beaver, as the series title. When the series moved to TBS for season two, the television movie was repackaged into four 30-minute "pilot" episodes as part of the renamed The New Leave It to Beaver series. These were referred to as "special episodes" in an added voice-over by Barbara Billingsley and were known as:

1. "Still the Beaver: Part I"
2. "Still the Beaver: Part II"
3. "Still the Beaver: Part III"
4. "Still the Beaver: Part IV"

==== Season 1 (1984–85) ====
This season aired on The Disney Channel as Still the Beaver. The season was split into two halves, and could be considered as two separate seasons. Most of the episodes during the second half of the season, which begins with "Escape from the Salt Mines", aired during the summer and fall of 1985, which is technically within the span of the 1985–86 TV season. The episode "Dear Pen Pal II" was produced to be The Disney Channel's series finale and features only clips from Season One, but did not actually air until the third season on TBS.

No. overall	No. in season	Title	Directed by	Written by	Original release date
1	1	"Growing Pains"	Nick Abdo	Brian Levant & Richard Gurman	November 7, 1984
After Oliver is excluded from the family’s construction project, he sets out to prove how responsible he is.
2	2	"Thanksgiving Day"	Bob Claver	Brian Levant	November 21, 1984
Kip announces that he is not spending Thanksgiving Day with the family. Note: Hugh Beaumont's real life sister, Gloria, guest stars in this episode; while Larry D. Mann was cast as Fred Rutherford due to Richard Deacon's death shortly before the series entered production.
3	3	"Supply and Demand"	Nick Abdo	Richard Gurman & Brian Levant	December 5, 1984
Wally buys an expensive doll for Kelly, who then loses it.
4	4	"Pet Peeves"	Norman Abbott	Jeffrey Pohn & Andrew Horowitz	December 19, 1984
The Cleaver house becomes a menagerie when Kip and Oliver bring home pets.
5	5	"Girl Talk"	Nick Abdo	George Tibbles	January 2, 1985
Kelly is nervous when she is cast in the title role of “Sleeping Beauty”; Wally and Beaver suspect that June may elope. Guest starring: Chad Allen
6	6	"The Gladiators"	Bob Claver	Richard Gurman	January 16, 1985
Oliver becomes a member of a gang of bullies.
7	7	"The Piano Lesson"	Nick Abdo	Richard Gurman	January 30, 1985
Kelly’s ruse to make her parents think she is a musical genius backfires when they arrange for her to take private piano lessons. Guest starring: Ray Walston
8	8	"Paper Tiger"	Jeffrey Ganz	Story by : Joe Glauberg; Teleplay by : Richard Gurman	February 13, 1985
Beaver and June convince Oliver to find his niche by participating in school activities. Note: Rich Correll (Richard Rickover) reprises his role from the original series for the first of two first season episodes, in addition to having appeared in the movie special. As an adult, Correll became one of the most successful television sitcom directors in Hollywood, although he never directed an episode of this series.
9	9	"No Free Lunch"	Nick Abdo	Lawrence Gay and Michael J. DiGaetano	February 27, 1985
Oliver, Kip and Kelly sell subscriptions to earn money to buy a go-cart.
10	10	"Dear Pen Pal"	Nick Abdo	Fred Fox, Jr. & Richard Correll	March 13, 1985
Oliver details his latest sibling spat in a letter to his pen pal in Africa. Guest starring: Nicole Eggert
11	11	"Haskells vs. Cleavers"	Brian Levant	Brian Levant	March 27, 1985
The two rival Little League teams, one coached by Eddie and the other by Beaver, have their showdown.
12	12	"Our Big Girl"	Bob Claver	Tom Tenowich	April 10, 1985
Kelly fears that her parents are divorcing when they begin to act in a strange way.
13	13	"Slumber Party"	Norman Abbott	Tony Dow	April 24, 1985
An unwelcome guest at Kelly’s party becomes the center of attention.
14	14	"Steppin' Out"	Bob Claver	Cindy Begel and Lesa Kite	May 15, 1985
The Cleavers intervene when Freddie admits he has no date for the school dance. Guest starring: Shannen Doherty, Christina Applegate and Robyn Lively
15	15	"Father's Day"	Nick Abdo	Brian Levant	June 5, 1985
Beaver’s sartorial appearance is not uppermost in Oliver’s mind when he buys his dad a trick hat for Father’s Day.
16	16	"String of Pearls"	Brian Levant	Richard Gurman	June 19, 1985
Kelly’s friend Peggy coaxes her into trying on June’s pearl necklace.
17	17	"Give and Take"	Bob Claver	Fred Fox, Jr.	July 3, 1985
The Cleavers reluctantly make room for Eddie when his wife, tired of his irresponsibility, throws him out.
18	18	"Carried Away"	Nick Abdo	Fred Fox, Jr.	July 17, 1985
Oliver is unable to resist a dare by Freddie, and soon finds himself carried aloft by a balloon.
19	19	"Escape from the Salt Mines"	Brian Levant	Michael J. DiGaetano & Lawrence Gay	August 7, 1985
To protect Lumpy, Beaver assumes the blame for his associate’s blunder—and is promptly fired by his boss.
20	20	"Sink or Swim"	Bob Claver	Richard Gurman	August 21, 1985
Despite prodding, Kelly is adamant about not taking swimming lessons. Guest starring: Rich Correll.
21	21	"Movin' On"	Roger Duchowny	Joe Glauberg	September 4, 1985
Wally blanches when Mary Ellen suggests he trade in his car; Kip and Freddie panic as they start their first day in high school. Guest starring: Jack Black.
22	22	"Violet Rutherford Returns"	Nick Abdo	Lesa Kite & Cindy Begel	September 18, 1985
Beaver is thrilled when his childhood heartthrob returns to town, but her manners turn Oliver and Kip off. Note: Veronica Cartwright reprises her role from the original series in this episode.
23	23	"While the Beav's Away"	Nick Abdo	Story by : Carol Croland & Tom Lavagnino; Teleplay by : Michael J. DiGaetano & Lawrence Gay	October 2, 1985
Beaver goes away and leaves June in charge of the boys.
24	24	"Wow"	Brian Levant	Brian Levant & Richard Gurman	October 16, 1985
Oliver and Kelly find Beaver’s old comic books, which turns out to be worth a small fortune to collectors.
25	25	"A Boy and His Snake"	Bob Claver	Cindy Begel & Lesa Kite	November 6, 1985
Freddie refuses to follow the veterinarian’s suggestion that his beloved but ailing snake be put to sleep.
26	26	"Punching In"	Jeffrey Ganz	Lawrence Gay & Michael J. DiGaetano	December 4, 1985
Kip gets a job as a gas station attendant to earn money for concert tickets.

=== The New Leave It to Beaver ===
==== Season 2 (1986–87) ====
From this season onward, the show aired on TBS as The New Leave It to Beaver.

No. overall	No. in season	Title	Directed by	Written by	Original release date
27	1	"Dumb Luck"	Brian Levant	Michael J. DiGaetano & Lawrence Gay	September 8, 1986
Freddie convinces babysitter Kip to haul Oliver and Kelly along to a carnival, where the boys have planned a tryst with two girls.
28	2	"On the Wrong Track"	Bob Claver	Paul Diamond	September 15, 1986
Oliver is alarmed by the growing romance between his teacher and June, so he makes her out to be an inveterate gambler. Note: William Schallert reprises his guest role from the original series for the second time in the revival series, having also appeared in the first season episode "Paper Tiger". Schallert had first appeared as Mr. Bloomgarden in the original series episode "Beaver's Short Pants" in 1957.
29	3	"Puppy Love"	Jeffrey Ganz	Lesa Kite and Cindy Begel	September 22, 1986
When Kelly is rescued from a fracas by Freddie, she comes to see the Haskell rascal in a new light. Note: This episode includes a dream sequence featuring the cast dancing and lip-synching to The Temptations song, My Girl.
30	4	"A Farewell to Freddie"	Roger Duchowny	Cindy Begel and Lesa Kite	September 29, 1986
Compassion prompts Freddie to give his dad’s betting money to the Cleaver kids, who need to replace a broken window. Guest starring: Christina Applegate.
31	5	"Heavy Metal"	Brian Levant	Dennis Snee	October 6, 1986
Oliver becomes the laughingstock of the class when he gets braces, so he asks Kelly to help him remove them. Note: This episode is the first of several episodes written by Dennis Snee, father of series star John Snee.
32	6	"In the Wings"	Roger Duchowny	Lawrence Gay & Michael J. DiGaetano	October 13, 1986
Kip auditions for the lead in the school drama in hopes of playing opposite his heartthrob, but Freddie is cast instead. Mary Ellen (Janice Kent) does not appear in this episode.
33	7	"How's Your Bird?"	Tony Singletary	Dennis Snee	October 20, 1986
Kelly finds herself dove-sitting Oliver’s bird while her cousin is away on vacation. Guest starring: Dave Madden
34	8	"Does Not a Woman Make"	Mel Ferber	Jeanne Baruch & Jeanne Romano	October 27, 1986
Kelly figures that wearing a bra will make her more mature. Guest starring: Brian Austin Green.
35	9	"Perfect Candidate"	Roger Duchowny	Cindy Begel & Lesa Kite	November 3, 1986
Councilwoman June learns she will not be running unopposed in the election: Eddie has announced his candidacy.
36	10	"In the Dark"	Norman Abbott	Story by : Lawrence Gay & Michael DiGaetano; Teleplay by : Brian Levant & Richard Gurman	November 10, 1986
Wally and Beaver reminisce in this episode featuring clips from the original series.
37	11	"Birth Announcement"	Brian Levant	Richard Gurman	November 17, 1986
Mary Ellen goes into labor right after designated driver Eddie leaves for a card game. Note: This episode features Wally (Tony Dow) singing the newly written lyrics to the series' theme song, The Toy Parade, to his newborn son. The lyrics were written by original composer David Kahn at the request of the producers for the new series.
38	12	"The Brothers Cleaver"	Roger Duchowny	Fred Fox, Jr.	November 24, 1986
Beaver hopes to promote tranquility by forcing his squabbling sons to spend an entire day together.
39	13	"Miss Honeywell Comes to Town"	Jeffrey Ganz	Cindy Begel and Lesa Kite	December 1, 1986
Wally’s former nanny comes to take care of Kevin, but her officious manner rattles Mary Ellen. Guest starring: Alice Ghostley
40	14	"A Day in Mayfield"	Brian Levant	Paul Diamond	December 8, 1986
It’s a learning experience for the Cleaver men when Beaver chaperones Oliver’s class trip and Wally takes care of Kevin and Kelly.
41	15	"Bad Poetry"	Jan DeWitt	Story by : Earl Kress; Teleplay by : Cindy Begel & Lesa Kite and Lawrence Gay & Michael J. DiGaetano	December 15, 1986
Unable to write her own poem for school, Kelly resorts to plagiarism and is found out by a classmate. Guest starring: Heather O'Rourke
42	16	"Home for Christmas"	Roger Duchowny	Barry O'Brien	December 22, 1986
Eddie puts his son Freddie up to entering a billboard-sitting contest in which the first prize is a car, but he starts feeling guilty when Christmas finds his son still perched. Note: This is the only Christmas themed episode in the entire Leave It to Beaver franchise and features the cast singing a rendition of We Wish You a Merry Christmas in the episode's tag scene.
43	17	"Earth Angels"	Brian Levant	Brian Levant	January 12, 1987
To prove he’s not a loafer, Oliver works around the house—and is given an expensive pair of sneakers as a reward.
44	18	"Super Sunday"	Brian Levant	Fred Fox, Jr.	January 19, 1987
An act by Freddie wins him four tickets to the Super Bowl—which Eddie takes and shares with Wally, Beaver, and Lumpy. Note: Although the episode was filmed at another location on a different date, Beaver, Wally, Lumpy, and Eddie are portrayed as attending Super Bowl XXI, and utilized official signage and souvenirs from the game, as held at the Rose Bowl on Sunday, January 25, 1987, six days after the episode originally aired.
45	19	"The Bestest Dad"	Bob Claver	Fred Fox, Jr.	January 26, 1987
Beaver has trouble keeping his promise to help Oliver with a project when his own job becomes too demanding.
46	20	"A Slice of Life"	Roger Duchowny	Michael J. DiGaetano & Lawrence Gay	February 2, 1987
Eddie’s hopes for financial success mushroom after he buys a pizza parlor.
47	21	"I Had It All"	Bob Claver	Andrew Horowitz	February 9, 1987
When two different girls fall for Kip, he decides to date both of them and not reveal that his affections are divided.
48	22	"A Night in Mayfield"	Mel Ferber	Paul Diamond	February 16, 1987
A cranky infant and an ailing rabbit have both Cleaver households scrambling for remedies.
49	23	"Murder in Mayfield"	Frank R. Saperstein	Lawrence Gay & Michael J. DiGaetano	February 23, 1987
Amateur gumshoe Oliver investigates strange happenings in the Haskell household.
50	24	"Got to Get You Out of My Life"	Jeffrey Ganz	Story by : Fred Fox, Jr. & Tony Dow; Teleplay by : Fred Fox, Jr.	March 4, 1987
Fed up with the Haskells, June resolves to minimize the Cleavers’ contact.
51	25	"Material Girl"	Jeffrey Pohn	Alan Moskowitz	March 11, 1987
Heather and Kelly start their own business designing T-shirts. Note: This is Heather O'Rourke's second and final appearance before she died less than 10 months later. She was close friends in real life with recurring guest star Keri Houlihan (J.J. Rutherford), and appeared as a guest star on Houlihan's NBC series Our House between her first and second appearances on The New Leave it to Beaver.
52	26	"The Bruise Brothers"	Frank R. Saperstein	Dennis Snee	March 18, 1987
Beaver recruits Wally to teach Oliver how to fight after his son is roughed up by the school bully. Notes: Jeri Weil makes her one and only appearance in The New Leave it to Beaver when she reprises her role as Judy Hensler from the original series. This episode also features a unique 70-second opening credits sequence which differs from all other episodes of season two, inclusive of an extended version of the theme song and live action clips mixed in with the normal animated actor credit cards. Mary Ellen (Janice Kent) does not appear in this episode.
53	27	"Yesterday's Gone"	Brian Levant	Fred Fox, Jr.	March 25, 1987
As the date of his reunion approaches, Wally is unusually somber, and his old sweetheart unusually attentive. Note: This episode features the guest appearances of several actors from the original series, including Cheryl Holdridge (Julie Foster) and Luke "Tiger" Fafara (Tooey Brown). Pamela Beaird, who had played Mary Ellen Rogers in the original series - a role assumed by Janice Kent in the revival series, also appears in the newly created role of Irene.

==== Season 3 (1987–88) ====
No. overall	No. in season	Title	Directed by	Written by	Original release date
54	1	"It's a Small World"	1987 Introduction: Frank R. Saperstein; 1957 Pilot: Jerry Hopper	1987 Introduction: Brian Levant & Fred Fox, Jr. 1957 Pilot: Joe Connelly and Bob Mosher	October 4, 1987
In the 1957 pilot of the original Leave It to Beaver series, It's a Small World, Wally and Beaver win a bike from the milk company—but something smells sour. Notes: In this original series pilot, Ward is played by Casey Adams and Wally is played by Paul Sullivan. Harry Shearer portrayed a character similar to Eddie Haskell, while Diane Brewster and Richard Deacon went on to play different roles in the original Leave it to Beaver series. The episode originally aired as part of the anthology series Heinz Studio 57 on April 23, 1957, but was subsequently lost until it was rediscovered in 1987. Although the original pilot film did not include the series theme song "The Toy Parade", a 1950s arrangement of the song was played for the opening credits of The New Leave it to Beaver intro to the special, which featured Barbara Billingsley, Tony Dow, and Jerry Mathers standing in front of the Pine Street house.
55	2	"Dear Pen Pal II"	Nick Abdo	Brian Levant	October 12, 1987
Oliver writes another letter to his pen pal in Africa and in the process reflects on some of the most memorable moments—in clips—that have taken place since he moved in with his grandma after his parents’ divorce. Notes: This episode, told from the point of view of a young Oliver in a similar fashion to the first season episode "Dear Pen Pal", was intended to be The Disney Channel's series finale of Still the Beaver. However, the episode was ultimately shelved and not aired in that capacity. As a result, all flashback scenes are from the show's first season.
56	3	"First Base"	Brian Levant	Brian Levant & Fred Fox, Jr.	October 19, 1987
Kelly’s first boy-girl party is viewed as a rite of passage by her father. Note: This was the first original episode produced for the show's third season.
57	4	"A Part of Life"	Frank R. Saperstein	Dennis Snee & Greg Fields	October 26, 1987
Kelly is reluctant to attend her first funeral after an aunt to whom she had been close dies. Note: During this episode's flashback scenes featuring Aunt Martha, Young Kelly and Young Oliver are played by Juanita Kiff and Mark Snee, the real life siblings of series stars Kaleena Kiff and John Snee, respectively. Irene Tedrow, who plays Aunt Martha, reprises the role in the episode "Ensign Cleaver" later in the season.
58	5	"Life Without Father"	Roger Duchowny	Brian Levant & Fred Fox, Jr.	November 2, 1987
Freddie plots to reunite his father and grandfather, who haven’t spoken to each other in years. Note: George O. Petrie reprises his role as George Haskell for the first and only time since he portrayed Eddie's father in the final season of the original series in 1963.
59	6	"Perfect Harmony"	Frank R. Saperstein	Fred Fox, Jr.	November 9, 1987
A female singer talks her way into Kip’s all-male rock band, but her wheedling makes her unpopular with the other members. Notes: As the end credits roll at the end of the episode, Jerry Mathers, Kipp Marcus, and Eric Osmond play a rendition of a song called "Happiness is Havin'", which had been released as a single in 1966 by Mathers' band Beaver and the Trappers. The song had been co-written by Richard Correll, who had portrayed Richard Rickover on Leave it to Beaver. The song "Fire in the Gym" which is performed by Kipp and Freddie's band, is performed again in the fourth season episode "Darkness on the Edge of Mayfield".
60	7	"Between Friends"	Jeffrey Pohn	Jeanne Baruch & Jeanne Romano	November 16, 1987
Oliver feels bereft of companionship when his cousin and best pal fall for each other.
61	8	"The Terrible Lizards"	Jeff Ganz	Elliot Stern	November 30, 1987
After Oliver brings home an unimpressive report card, Beaver places him under Freddie’s tutelage.
62	9	"See You in Court"	Bob Claver	Lesa Kite & Cindy Begel	December 7, 1987
Eddie volunteers to make the arrangements for a vacation that Beaver and his buddies are planning for Wally.
63	10	"Oops"	Jerry Mathers	Barry O'Brien	December 21, 1987
Kelly is fascinated with the computer Wally buys for newly employed journalist Mary Ellen. Note: Jerry Mathers makes his directorial debut with this episode.
64	11	"DRVRS-ED"	Tony Dow	Tony Dow & Harry Garfield	January 18, 1988
When Beaver and Wally can’t agree on who should teach Kip to drive, he turns to Eddie, who’s willing to share his expertise. Note: Tony Dow directed and co-wrote this episode.
65	12	"Ensign Cleaver"	Brian Levant	Brian Levant & Fred Fox, Jr.	February 1, 1988
A frazzled June is feeling overwhelmed—and all alone—on the 44th Anniversary of her wedding date. Notes: Actor David Prather makes the first of two appearances as young Ward Cleaver. The flashback scenes featuring Ward and June in their twenties are shown in black and white.
66	13	"Plenty of Fish in the Sea"	Frank Saperstein	Story by : Dennis Snee and Greg Phillips; Teleplay by : Stephen Paymer and David Paymer	February 8, 1988
When Oliver has no date for the Valentine’s Day dance, Kip arranges a date for him with his girlfriend’s younger sister.
67	14	"Don't Go Changing"	Walter Von Huene	Fred Fox, Jr. & Dennis Snee	February 15, 1988
Freddie tries to help a drifter find his place in society.
68	15	"And Everybody's Happy"	Brian Levant	Brian Levant & Fred Fox, Jr.	February 22, 1988
Kelly sees her first job babysitting Kevin as a chance to prove herself, while her friends see it as a chance to party without adult supervision.
69	16	"Wrap Party"	Jeffrey Pohn	Story by : Dennis Snee; Teleplay by : Brian Levant & Fred Fox, Jr.	February 29, 1988
A behind-the-scenes look, hosted by actor Frank Bank. Note: This episode is entirely a behind the scenes look at the production of The New Leave it to Beaver, including scenes recorded at a cast wrap party and outtakes from the show's first two and a half seasons.
70	17	"Junior Prom"	Tony Dow	Cindy Begel & Lesa Kite	April 18, 1988
Kip breaks his date when his heartthrob is available at the last minute.
71	18	"Teenage Rebellion"	Brian Levant	Greg Phillips	April 25, 1988
Oliver and Kelly grow weary of being treated like children and form a united front against their parents.
72	19	"Pacific Overture"	Frank R. Saperstein	Dennis Snee & Billy Daley	May 2, 1988
Beaver throws a dinner party to court an important client who, by the end of the soiree, wants to court June.
73	20	"Madcap Dreams"	Roger Duchowny	Fred Fox, Jr. & Dennis Snee	May 9, 1988
Eddie snaps out of his depression when he’s inspired to become a country singer.
74	21	"Day Dreamin'"	Brian Levant	Brian Levant & Fred Fox, Jr.	May 16, 1988
Kip dreams that he tries to win the heart of the new girl at school in this episode featuring Brian Wilson of The Beach Boys. Note: This episode is presented in the form of a musical, with the cast breaking into song and dance sporadically. Jay Gruska, who went on to do the musical scores of such television series as Charmed and Supernatural, composed the original music performed by the cast in this episode.
75	22	"The End of the World"	Brian Levant	Jeanne Baruch & Jeanne Romano	May 24, 1988
At a skating party, Kelly’s classmate feigns an injury to steal Duffy away. ' Note: Recurring guest star Giovanni Ribisi, credited as Vonni Ribisi, makes his final appearance as Duffy Guthrie after portraying the character for three seasons. His real life friendship with John Snee spawned a cameo appearance by Snee in a 1992 episode of The Wonder Years, in which Ribisi appeared as a main character during the show's final season.
76	23	"Gosh, Wally"	Brian Levant	Hubert Whitney, Jr.	October 2, 1988
Wally is seriously injured when he has an accident on Eddie’s motorcycle. Notes: This episode features Tony Dow's real life son, Christopher, portraying his father in flashback scenes to a high school basketball game in 1963. Juanita Kiff again assumes the role of young Kelly to portray her real life sister, Kaleena Kiff at a younger age. David Prather makes his second and final appearance as a young Ward Cleaver, having previously appeared in the episode "Ensign Cleaver". This was the first of seven season three episodes that had been postponed for broadcast until the 1988-89 season. The reason for the delay was likely a result of the 1988 Writers Guild of America strike which halted production on most network series between March 7 and August 7, 1988. This may also explain the use of unusual pen names in most of the final episodes of the season: the writer of this episode chose to be credited under the pen name "Hubert Whitney, Jr.", the formal name for the character of Whitey Whitney from the original series.
77	24	"The Great Debate"	Walter Von Huene	Wendy Royal	October 9, 1988
Kip's stellar successes prompt a jealous Oliver to improve his grades by cheating.
78	25	"Family Scrapbook II"	Jerry Mathers	Brian Levant & Fred Fox, Jr.	October 16, 1988
The antics of family members are recalled as June and Mary Ellen organize the clan’s photo album. Notes: This episode features clips from past episodes. Although aired out of sequence, this was the final episode produced for the show's third season, and was intended to be the series finale, hence the title reference to the final episode of the original series. This was also the final episode to be produced in California prior to the show being moved to Universal Studios Florida for its fourth and final season. The move was due to the Cleaver home site being re-purposed for the production of the Tom Hanks film, The Burbs.
79	26	"A Casual Affair"	Tony Dow	Lorenzo Smith	October 23, 1988
Mary Ellen is vexed by the advances of her new boss’s son, who hints that her cooperation may get Wally a new client.
80	27	"Cursed Again"	Janice Kent	K.K. Schwartz	October 30, 1988
A customer displeased with Eddie’s paving job decides to put a curse on him. Note: This episode was directed by Janice Kent, who portrays Mary Ellen in the series.
81	28	"Hook, Line and Sinker"	Roger Duchowny	S.M. Schmitz	November 6, 1988
Wally agrees to go fishing with the guys on the same weekend he had promised a romantic getaway for Mary Ellen.
82	29	"Inside Eddie Haskell"	Jerry Mathers	Sebastian Jones	November 13, 1988
Eddie visits a psychiatrist incognito to determine the cause of all his woes. Note: This episode features clips from episodes of both the original Leave it to Beaver series and the revival series.

==== Season 4 (1988–89) ====
No. overall	No. in season	Title	Directed by	Written by	Original release date
83	1	"Chew Slowly"	Brian Levant	Brian Levant & Jeffrey Pohn	January 1, 1989
Kelly takes a ride in the fast lane when she defies her parents and goes out on a date with an older guy.
84	2	"First Down"	Roger Duchowny	Dennis Snee	January 8, 1989
Oliver has a hard time scoring points with Beaver when he decides to quit the school football team. Note: It is revealed that Beaver went on to play high school in the years following the end of the original series.
85	3	"Beyond the Sandbox"	Roger Duchowny	David Richardson	January 15, 1989
Wally and Mary Ellen try to enroll Kevin in the Center for Progressive Education.
86	4	"Party Line"	Roger Duchowny	David Leaf	January 22, 1989
Oliver starts a relationship on a telephone party line, and labors over whether or not to ask her out. Notes: A working title for this episode was "1-800-PARTY", but the title was changed when the number was altered to a 555 number to comply with the fictitious numbering plan designated by the North American Numbering Plan. As Oliver flips through the TV channels, a brief clip of Hugh Beaumont during his role in The Mole People can be seen.
87	5	"On a Roll"	Roger Duchowny	Greg Phillips	January 29, 1989
After a winning streak at the casinos in Atlantic City, Eddie compulsively buys a greyhound at the dog track.
88	6	"Road Trip"	Roger Duchowny	Cindy Begel & Lesa Kite	February 5, 1989
Kip and Freddie have a party in Florida when a college interview trip goes awry.
89	7	"Still the New Leave It to Beaver"	Roger Duchowny	Cindy Begel & Lesa Kite	February 12, 1989
Kip dreams about his family in the 21st century after a “wait ‘til you have children of your own” lecture from Beaver. Notes: The "future" year that Kip fantasizes about is 2014. The episode features a young Joaquin Phoenix as Kip's future son. One piece of accurately predicted future technology was a photo on the Cleavers' wall similar to a real world 21st Century Smart TV. The episode's title is a mash up of both the titles used for the revival series during its run. A montage of photos similar to the graphics used for the opening credits of seasons two and three is used to transition into the dream sequence.
90	8	"And Freddie Makes Three"	Tony Dow	Tony Dow & Harry Garfield	February 19, 1989
Freddie is thrown out of the house after he announces he’s quitting school to marry a divorcee with a child.
91	9	"What If?"	Jeffrey Pohn	Story by : Andy Horowitz and Dennis Snee & Greg Phillips; Teleplay by : Dennis Snee & Greg Phillips	February 26, 1989
Shortly before graduation, Kip ignites a relationship with an old flame. Note: Heather Hobbs reprises her role as Laurie from the second season episode "I Had it All".
92	10	"Darkness on the Edge of Mayfield"	Peter Smokler	Al Aidekman & David Leaf	March 19, 1989
Lumpy agrees to produce a music video for Kip and Freddie, but he strikes a sour note when he casts the lead. Note: This episode includes the attempted production of a music video based on a song previously featured in the third season episode "Perfect Harmony" called "Fire in the Gym".
93	11	"Rockets Red Glare"	Jeffrey Pohn	Lesa Kite & Cindy Begel	March 26, 1989
It’s World War III in the Haskell household when Bomber is expelled from military school. Note: Christian Osmond returns as Bomber Haskell for the first time since season three. Christian was slated to become a regular cast member if the series had returned for a fifth season.
94	12	"The Return of the Monster in the Closet"	Frank Saperstein	David Richardson	April 8, 1989
Wally and Mary Ellen conjure up a scheme to help Kevin get over his fear of a monster living in his closet.
95	13	"What Has Four Legs and Flies?"	Walter von Huene	Jeanne Romano & Jeanne Baruch	April 9, 1989
Kelly must prove to her parents that she’s responsible enough to have a horse—but the odds are not in her favor.
96	14	"A Day at the Mall"	Peter Smokler	Story by : Greg Phillips & David Richardson; Teleplay by : David Leaf	April 30, 1989
Kelly and Oliver play hooky from school and go to the mall. Note: Scenes from this episode were filmed at The Florida Mall in Orlando, Florida.
97	15	"Shortcuts"	Jerry Mathers	Story by : David Leaf & David Richardson; Teleplay by : Greg Phillips	May 7, 1989
Wally and Eddie are stranded on the back roads of Canada when Eddie takes a short cut to save money. Note: A Florida production company was invited to attend the taping of this episode to record behind the scenes footage and interviews.
98	16	"Man's Greatest Achievements"	Brian Levant	Lesa Kite & Cindy Begel	May 14, 1989
Oliver daydreams about accomplishing great feats when required to write a paper about the subject. Notes: Marion Ross makes a cameo guest appearance as "Mrs. Cunningham" from Happy Days in a dream sequence by Oliver. A scene from this episode was filmed at the Boardwalk & Baseball Theme Park, Baseball City, Florida. This episode was the most expensive to produce of the show's fourth and final season.
99	17	"Brother vs. Brother"	Janice Kent	Cindy Begel & Lesa Kite	May 21, 1989
Freddie and Bomber’s brotherly love is put to the test when they both try to win the new girl in school.
100	18	"Dads and Grads: Part 1"	Tony Dow	Fred Fox, Jr.	May 28, 1989
Beaver’s romance with a teacher wilts when his ex-wife returns to Mayfield. Part One of Two. Note: Beaver's ex-wife, Kimberly, materializes for the first time since the 1983 premiere movie, but this time she is portrayed by actress Jeannie Wilson.
101	19	"Dads and Grads: Part 2"	Brian Levant	Fred Fox, Jr.	June 4, 1989
Conclusion. In the series finale, Beaver decides to reestablish the family ties that were severed by his divorce. Notes: At the time of production, it was not known for certain that this would be the series' final episode. Rusty Stevens reprises his role as Larry Mondello for only the second time since the original series ended, having appeared in the 1983 premiere movie.

== Reception ==
In 2002, TV Guide proclaimed the show #39 of the 50 worst TV shows of all time.

== Awards and nominations ==
Year	Award	Result	Category	Recipient
1988	Young Artist Awards	Won	Best Young Actress in a Cable Series or Special	Kaleena Kiff
1988	Young Artist Awards	Won	Best Cable Series	-
1988	Young Artist Awards	Nominated	Best Young Actor in a Cable Series or Special	John Snee
1988	Young Artist Awards	Nominated	Best Young Actor in a Cable Series or Special	Eric Osmond
1988	Young Artist Awards	Nominated	Best Young Actor in a Cable Series or Special	Kipp Marcus
1989	Young Artist Awards	Won	Best Young Actress in a Cable Series or Special	Kaleena Kiff
1989	Young Artist Awards	Nominated	Best Young Actor in a Cable Series or Special	John Snee
1989	Young Artist Awards	Nominated	Best Young Actor in a Cable Series or Special	Eric Osmond
1989	Young Artist Awards	Nominated	Best Young Actor in a Cable Series or Special	Kipp Marcus
1989	Young Artist Awards	Nominated	Best Cable Family Comedy, Drama Series or Special	-
1990	Young Artist Awards	Nominated	Best Young Actor in an Off-Primetime Family Series	John Snee
1990	Young Artist Awards	Nominated	Best Off-Primetime Family Series	-

== See also ==
- List of television series revivals
