= Lumpy Rutherford =

Clarence "Lumpy" Rutherford
- Frank Bank in his debut episode "Lumpy Rutherford".
- First appearance: "Lumpy Rutherford" (January 24, 1958)
- Last appearance: "The All-Night Party" (May 30, 1963)
- Created by: Joe Connelly; Bob Mosher
- Portrayed by: Frank Bank

In-universe information
- Gender: Male
- Family: Fred Rutherford (father); Geraldine Rutherford (mother); Unknown (brother); Violet Rutherford (younger sister); J.J. (daughter)

Clarence "Lumpy" Rutherford is a fictional character in the television sitcom Leave It to Beaver. The show aired from October 4, 1957, to June 20, 1963. Lumpy is a bit of a bully and, with Eddie Haskell, is one of Wally Cleaver's friends.

Lumpy was portrayed in the original series by Frank Bank. The actor also appeared as Lumpy in the sequel series, The New Leave It to Beaver (1985–1989). "Lumpy" was portrayed by Justin Restivo in the 1997 spin-off film, Leave It to Beaver, while his portrayer Frank Bank made an appearance in the film as "Frank".

== Overview ==
Lumpy is introduced to the viewer in the first-season episode "Lumpy Rutherford." He's the 16-year-old son of Fred (Ward Cleaver's co-worker). The Rutherfords live somewhere in the Cleaver neighborhood, which gives Lumpy the opportunity to bully the Cleaver boys on their way home from school. The boys plot Lumpy's comeuppance, but the plot backfires when Fred accidentally steps into the trap. Although a touch of the bully never leaves Lumpy, he eventually becomes Wally's friend. They are in the same class together at school, in spite of a three-year age spread between the two. In the third-season episode "Wally's Test," Lumpy's first name is spelled Clarance, not Clarence.

Lumpy is a papa's boy. He is well known for referring to his father as "Daddy." Fred would tell Clarence he was too old or too big (usually referring to his "lumpiness") to call him "Daddy." A running gag on the show was to have Fred, who usually referred to his son as Clarence, call him "Lumpy" when angry. Fred would also call Lumpy a "big boob" or a "big oaf." Lumpy's mother Gwendolyn ("Geraldine", in some early episodes) and his younger sister, Violet (who is about Beaver's age), round out the family. Violet gives Beaver a black eye in an early episode. Lumpy also has an unseen brother.

Lumpy is not the brightest fellow in Mayfield. He is a very hefty young lad and is often teased because of it. Lumpy often persuades others to do things that he is really too afraid to do himself. He sometimes picks on Beaver. Beaver responds by yelling at Lumpy from a distance "Lumpy Dumpy looks like an ape." Several references are made that Lumpy plays the clarinet, and later plays the tuba.

When Lumpy wins a college football scholarship in a later episode, June Cleaver throws a party and bakes a cake in the shape of a football field. In another episode, Wally and Eddie Haskell play a prank on Lumpy that involves the rear axle of his car being removed with a chain.

=== The New Leave It to Beaver ===
Lumpy and Beaver form a successful business partnership (the "Cleaver and Rutherford Co."). As with their fathers, it is never specified exactly what the scope of the business is. Previously, both men had worked for Fred Rutherford's company until Fred fires Lumpy, and Beaver resigns.

Lumpy is married and has a daughter, J.J.
