= Audrey Meadows =

American actress (1922–1996)

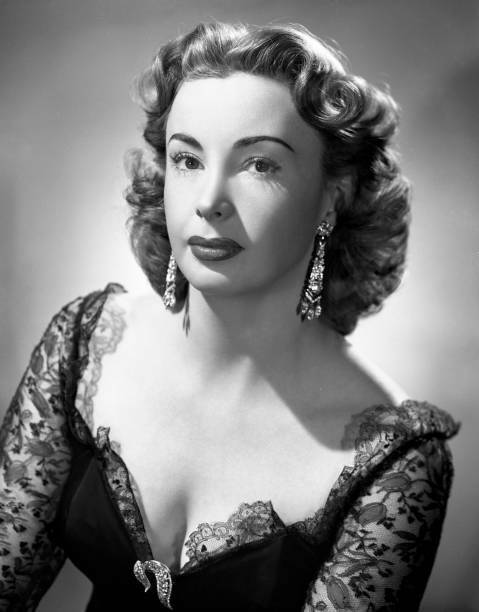
- Meadows in 1952
- Born: Audrey Cotter; February 8, 1922; New York City, U.S.
- Died: February 3, 1996 (aged 73); Los Angeles, California, U.S.
- Other name: Audrey Six
- Occupations: Actress; memoirist
- Years active: 1950–1995
- Known for: The Honeymooners; Too Close for Comfort
- Spouses: Randolph Rouse (m. 1956; div. 1958) Robert Six (m. 1961; died 1986)
- Relatives: Jayne Meadows (sister)
- Website: audreymeadows.com

Jackie Gleason, Art Carney, and Meadows in The Honeymooners

Audrey Meadows (born Audrey Cotter; February 8, 1922 – February 3, 1996) was an American actress who portrayed the deadpan housewife Alice Kramden on the 1950s American television comedy The Honeymooners. She was the younger sister of actress Jayne Meadows.

== Early life ==
Meadows was born Audrey Cotter in New York City on February 8, 1922, the youngest of four siblings. There was considerable confusion concerning her year of birth and place of birth for many years.

Her parents, the Reverend Francis James Meadows Cotter and his wife, the former Ida Miller Taylor, were Episcopal missionaries in Wuchang, China, where her three elder siblings were born. Her older sister was actress Jayne Meadows, and she had two older brothers. The family returned permanently to the United States in 1927. Audrey attended high school at the Barrington School for Girls in Great Barrington, Massachusetts. Moving to New York City to pursue her career, Audrey became a resident in the famed Rehearsal Club along with other aspiring actresses.

== Career ==
=== The Honeymooners ===
After high school, Meadows sang in the Broadway musical Top Banana before becoming a regular on television in The Bob and Ray Show. She was then hired to play Alice on The Jackie Gleason Show after the actress who originated the role, Pert Kelton, was forced to leave the show due to blacklisting (but the official reason given was that Kelton was suffering from a health problem).

When The Honeymooners became a half-hour sitcom, Meadows (who was six years younger than Gleason) continued in the role. She then returned to play Alice after a long hiatus when Gleason produced occasional Honeymooners specials in the 1970s. Meadows had auditioned for Gleason and was rejected for being too chic and pretty to play Alice. Realizing that she needed to change her appearance, Meadows the next day submitted a photo of herself, one in which she looked much plainer. Gleason changed his mind, and she won the role of Alice. The character of Alice became more associated with Meadows than with the others who played her, and she reprised her role as Alice on other shows as well, both in a man-on-the-street interview for The Steve Allen Show (Steve Allen was her brother-in-law) and in a parody sketch on The Jack Benny Program.

Meadows was the only member of the Honeymooners cast to earn residual royalties after the "Classic 39" episodes of the show from 1955 to 1956 started airing in reruns. Her brother Edward, a lawyer, had inserted a clause into her original contract whereby she would be paid if the shows were re-broadcast, thus earning her millions of dollars. When the "lost" Honeymooners episodes from the variety shows were released, Joyce Randolph, who played Trixie Norton, received royalty payments.

For her work on the show, Meadows was nominated for a Primetime Emmy Award for Outstanding Supporting Actress in a Drama Series (then for "In a Regular Series") at the 8th Primetime Emmy Awards. She lost to Nanette Fabray in Caesar's Hour.

=== Career outside The Honeymooners ===
Meadows appeared in a 1960 episode of Alfred Hitchcock Presents titled "Mrs. Bixby and the Colonel's Coat", one of the 17 episodes in the 10-year series directed by Hitchcock, and a rare light-hearted one.

She appeared in feature films and on Dean Martin's television variety shows and celebrity roasts. She starred in an episode of Wagon Train in the episode's titled role of Nancy Palmer. Years later, Meadows played Ted Knight's mother-in-law in Too Close for Comfort (1982–1985). In real life, Meadows was only 1 year older than Knight.

She guest-starred on The Red Skelton Show, made an appearance in an episode of Murder, She Wrote ("If the Frame Fits"), and made an appearance in an episode of The Simpsons ("Old Money"), wherein she voiced the role of Bea Simmons, Grampa Simpson's girlfriend. During the second year of her second retirement, she returned to television in 1988 on CBS Summer Playhouse. Her last work was an appearance on Dave's World, in which she played the mother of Kenny (Shadoe Stevens). She and her sister, Jayne Meadows, played elderly sisters who owned the Sweet 16 diner in Season 4, Episode 9 of the TV series Sisters.

In total, Meadows earned four Primetime Emmy nominations for her television work, winning one for The Jackie Gleason Show.

== Personal life ==
In 1956 (during the run of The Honeymooners), Meadows married Randolph Rouse, a wealthy real-estate businessman. On August 24, 1961, Meadows married her second husband, Robert F. Six, president of Continental Airlines, in Honolulu, Hawaii. He died on October 6, 1986.

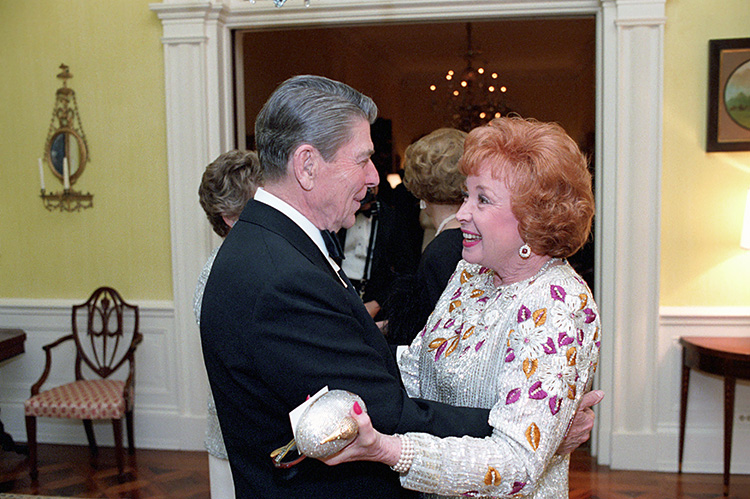
Ronald Reagan and Meadows in 1986 at his 75th birthday party in the White House.

== Banking and marketing career ==
Meadows served on the board of directors of the First National Bank of Denver for 11 years, the first woman to hold the position. From 1961 to 1981, she was an advisory director of Continental Airlines, where she was actively involved in marketing programs that included the designs of flight attendant and customer-service agent uniforms, aircraft interiors and Continental's exclusive President's Club airport club lounges.

== Memoirs ==
In October 1994, Meadows published her memoirs, Love, Alice: My Life As A Honeymooner.

== Illness and death ==
A longtime smoker, Meadows was diagnosed with lung cancer and given a year to live in 1995. She declined all but palliative treatment and died on February 3, 1996, after she slipped into a coma at the Cedars-Sinai Medical Center in Los Angeles. She was interred in Holy Cross Cemetery in Culver City, next to her second husband. Her headstone mistakenly shows her birth year as 1926.

== Legacy ==
Meadows was portrayed by Kristen Dalton in Gleason, a 2002 television film about the life of Jackie Gleason.

== Filmography ==
Film and television
Year	Title	Role	Notes
1950	The Baron of Arizona	Townswoman in Court Scene	Uncredited
1951	The Amazing Mr. Malone		Season 1 Episode 1: "Blood Is Thicker Than Water"
1951–1952	Bob & Ray	Regular	
1952	Lux Video Theatre	The Singer	Season 2 Episode 21: "Ceylon Treasure"
1952	Pulitzer Prize Playhouse	Lady Mary	Season 2 Episode 7: "Monsieur Beaucaire"
1952–1957	The Jackie Gleason Show	Alice Kramden / Sketch Actress / Audrey Meadows	113 episodes
1953	Man Against Crime		Season 4 Episode 21: "The Midnight Express"
1955–1956	The Honeymooners	Alice Kramden	39 episodes
1959	The United States Steel Hour		Episode: "Holiday on Wheels", Season 7 Episode 7: "Marriage... Handle with Care"
1960–1971	The Red Skelton Hour	Clara Appleby; Mrs. Cavendish; The Queen; Admissions Nurse	11 episodes
1960	Play of the Week	Nell Valentine	Season 1 Episode 34: "The Grand Tour"
1960	Alfred Hitchcock Presents	Mrs. Bixby	Season 6 Episode 1: "Mrs. Bixby and the Colonel's Coat"
1961	Wagon Train	Nancy Palmer	Season 4 Episode 24: "The Nancy Palmer Story"
1961	Checkmate	Althea Todd	Season 1 Episode 24: "One for the Book"
1961	General Electric Theater	Connie Marlowe	Season 9 Episode 28: "Sis Bowls 'Em Over"
1962	The DuPont Show of the Week	Constance	Season 1 Episode 20: "The Action in New Orleans"
1962	That Touch of Mink	Connie Emerson	
1962	Sam Benedict	Dr. Carrie Morton	Season 1 Episode 9: "Life Is a Lie, Love Is a Cheat"
1963	Take Her, She's Mine	Anne Michaelson	
1965	Please Don't Eat the Daisies	Kitty Clair	Season 1 Episode 15: "The Big Brass Blonde"
1965	Invisible Diplomats	Kelly Smith	Short
1966	Jackie Gleason: American Scene Magazine	Alice Kramden	Season 4 Episode 17: "The Honeymooners: The Adoption"
1966	Clown Alley	Washerwoman Clown	TV movie
1966	Password	Herself	Game Show Contestant / Celebrity Guest Star
1967	Rosie!	Mildred Deever	
1972	Love, American Style	Eve / Harriet / Mom	Segment: "Love and Dear Old Mom and Dad"
1974	The Dean Martin Celebrity Roast	Martha Washington	Season 9 Episode 22: "Celebrity Roast: George Washington"
1976	The Honeymooners Second Honeymoon	Alice Kramden	TV special
1977	The Honeymooners Christmas Special	Alice Kramden / Mother Cratchit	TV special
1978	The Honeymooners Valentine Special	Alice Kramden	TV special
1978	The Love Boat	Gladys Watkins	Season 1 Episode 21: "Taking Sides/Going by the Book/A Friendly Little Game"
1978	Starsky & Hutch	Hilda Zuckerman	Season 4 Episode 8: "Dandruff"
1978	The Second Honeymooners Christmas Special	Alice Kramden	TV special
1980	The Love Boat	Mrs. Elliott	Season 3 Episode 23: "Another Time, Another Place/Doctor Who/Gopher's Engagement"
1981	Lily: Sold Out!	Polly Jo	TV special
1982	Diff'rent Strokes	Mrs. Martinson	Season 4 Episode 15: "The Squatter"
1982–1986	Too Close for Comfort	Iris Martin	23 episodes
1984	The Love Boat	Helen Williams	Season 7 Episode 24: "A Rose is Not a Rose/Novelties/Too Rich and Too Thin"
1985	Hotel	Amelia Chelton	Season 3 Episode 4: "Pathways"
1986	Murder, She Wrote	Mildred Tilley	Season 2 Episode 22: "If the Frame Fits"
1986	Life with Lucy	Audrey (Lucy's sister)	Season 1 Episode 8: "Mother of the Bride"
1988	CBS Summer Playhouse	Aunt Lunar	Season 2 Episode 7: "The Johnsons Are Home"
1989	Nightingales	Mrs. Mandel	Season 1 Episode 4: "Episode #1.4"
1990	Red Pepper	Ina	TV movie
1990	Later (talk show)	Herself	Episode: "Audrey Meadows"
1990–1991	Uncle Buck	Maggie Hogoboom	16 episodes
1991	The Simpsons	Bea Simmons (voice)	Season 2 Episode 17: "Old Money"
1991	Hi Honey, I'm Home!	Alice Kramden	Season 1 Episode 3: "Fur Flies"
1992	Davis Rules	Gunny's Ex-Wife	Season 2 Episode 7: "Gunny's Ex"
1993	Sisters	Ada Benbow	Season 4 Episode 4: "A Kick in the Caboose"
1994	Burke's Law	Georgia Stark	Season 1 Episode 6: "Who Killed Alexander the Great?"
1994	Empty Nest	Margaret Randall	Season 6 Episode 22: "The Devil and Dr. Weston"
1995	Dave's World	Ruby	Season 2 Episode 23: "The Mommies" & Season 3 Episode 12: "Working Stiffs" (final role)
