= Characterz =

2016 Comedy film

- Directed by: Jon Binkowski; Mitchel Musso (Creative Director)
- Written by: Jon Binkowski; Lisa Enos Smith
- Produced by: David P. Pragg; Lisa Enos Smith; Jack Stiefel; Jim Timon; Matthew J. Durfee; Gregory Thies
- Starring: Mitchel Musso; Walt Willey; Miles D; Marc Musso; Ken Osmond; Isaac C. Singleton Jr.; Michael Winslow; Felix Silla; Ana Eligio
- Edited by: Ben Kupfer
- Music by: Peter J. Lehman
- Production company: MarVista Entertainment
- Distributed by: MarVista Entertainment
- Release date: July 12, 2016
- Running time: 102 minutes
- Country: United States
- Language: English

Characterz is a 2016 American comedy film. The film stars Mitchel Musso. It was funded on Indiegogo in December 2014, filmed in January 2015 in Celebration, Florida, and released on July 12, 2016.

== Plot ==
The story begins in medias res with Tucker being arrested while in costume, and then the bulk of the rest of the story is told as a buildup to that event.

Tucker Ostrowski recently graduated from a college in central Florida with an Associate of Arts degree, and is accepted to California Institute of the Arts, as he wants to go into music creation, animation, or theme park design. However, his parents recently filed for personal bankruptcy, so he cannot count on their money to pay for tuition. So, he needs to get a job to pay his own way, but has a criminal record because of a charge of vandalism in his teenage years. He just has to do community service, and expects it to be expunged from his record in two months, but the big parks in the area all do background checks. He looks into other jobs without success before finding that the amusement park Old Time Fun Town is hiring.

He goes to the theme park and is accepted on the spot from Mr. Lloyd, the hiring manager, with literally no questions asked, and Tucker is not even sure what job he has accepted at first. He finds he will work as a theme park mascot, Hoppy the Kangaroo, and immediately meets two-week-long veteran Jerry, a former high school mascot performer, who is working as Cap'n Jack's Parrot. Given the low budget nature of the park, Tucker is sent out to interact with the patrons immediately. With no training, he finds he has to learn the job as he goes, but finds that he enjoys the work. At lunchtime, Tucker meets Stu, who performs as Paws the Polar Bear. Tucker, Stu, and Jerry discuss park operations. The park general manager, Benjamin Fletcher, is a vaguely shady but oddly affable manager who knows all the employees by name. It is also well known that he plays poker with some "notorious types" but Tucker is grateful for the job and thinks nothing of it.

The second day on the job, before starting work, Jerry and Tucker watch news but ignore mention of a string of daring daylight robberies where the perpetrators are "elaborately disguised." Jerry has to go off to advertise for the park before it opens and relieve Sam, who comes to the break room dressed as Billy the Bulldog. Tucker helps Sam get out of costume and is surprised to learn that Sam is short for Samantha, not Samuel as he assumed. Sam works part time at the park, and her other job is working at the Haven House.

Mr. Fletcher informs the park staff that when he joined park management the previous summer, he promised to increase attendance and profits by offering quality games, rides, food, and merchandise. The result was that the park had about the same attendance as the year before. He hopes to get attendance and profits up through entertainment. The park was successful when Hoppy was first introduced 15 years before, but the original performer died 12 years ago and the character was retired, and there were no costumed performers in the park since. Fletcher plans to boost attendance by reintroducing Hoppy and several other costumed performers. He reveals that in addition to the four characters based on off-the-shelf costumes purchased from MaskUS, Inc., he has had the in-house art director Don Cluff design a large custom-made "Toby Slick" blue whale costume.

However, the costume proves too large and unwieldy for the current four performers, so Fletcher pulls in a favor and gets Franklin Jefferson Washington to wear the costume. He was a professional basketball player that got injured, then became the team's mascot, then was poached by Disney to play one of their tall characters, and then retired from that to start his own delivery business, likely selling drugs. The new character is a big hit with crowds and a huge draw. A few days later at Old Time Fun Town, the park employees practice for a Fourth of July parade. The actual parade is extremely lackluster and takes less than a minute to pass.

After a hard day at work, Sam suggests that Tucker visit her at her other job at the Haven House and get a new perspective on the job. He finds that the house is a haven for retired people with various health and mental problems who cannot live independently. One of the people at the home is Lyle, a reclusive old man. Tucker is left alone with him and in attempting to strike up a conversation, he explains that he costumes as a kangaroo. Lyle explains that he was "attacked by a kangaroo two nights ago" who came up to him while he was at an ATM and robbed him of $400.

A few days later at the Haven House, Tucker shows Sam several rough animations he has made. Sam tells Tucker she got accepted into an adult-gerontological nurse practitioner program in Los Angeles. Tucker still wants to go to California Institute of the Arts, but is still extremely far from that goal financially. He explains why he wants to go there. Sam points out that the seniors at Haven House never feel the sort of joy most people feel at an amusement park anymore, as their health problems severely limit their mobility.

Soon after, back at work Tucker learns Sam is spending a week in California to tour the campus. Stu is going to a cosplay convention over the weekend, leaving just Tucker and Jerry to cover the park schedule. Tucker has to cover for Stu for an offsite event at a private party that specifically requested the bird and polar bear costumes. Tucker is wary of covering for him, as Stu is known to be the sweatiest of the group, Paws the Polar Bear reeks even after intense cleaning, and Tucker will not have time to even attempt to clean it. Tucker and Jerry arrive at the party and are told that all they have to do are greet the guests. They learn that it is actually a furry party, and after they are done greeting guests, check around back to see what goes on at that sort of party. They are surprised to find it is a very tame and normal party. Back in the car, they see a police car speeding past, and checking the radio and find that the sixth in a string of robberies occurred, with this one being a bank heist.

In Tucker's free time, Tucker has started a personal project of creating entertainment for the seniors at the Haven House, despite his parents having pawned or sold almost all their tools. Tucker buys new power tools, but as his parents' financial situation becomes even more dire, his parents lose electricity, leaving him to attempt work by himself with hand tools. Tucker lets Jerry in on his plan, and he suggests getting help from the landscaping crew. They agree to help, and suggest using a large variety of construction supplies and old props that Old Time Fun Town has had in storage for decades. Tucker and Jerry also find the original head of Hoppy, and backup costumes for the rest of the characters, including Paws the Polar Bear. When Sam returns from her trip and goes to the Haven House, Tucker reveals that he designed and helped build a Tunnel of Love for the seniors, designed to be ridden in wheel chairs.

The next day while working Tucker is arrested in costume, as are Jerry, Sam, and Stu. They all assume that they are arrested for borrowing the items from the warehouse, as they did not inform Fletcher of their plan. At the police station, the detective shows them videos from the recent crime spree, which show people dressed in their same costumes committing robberies. However, all of their alibis check out and they are free to go, except for Stu, who is kept for further questioning and released later.

Jerry suspects that the people in the costumes worked for park operations. Tucker, Jerry, and Sam know that if they can get the backup costumes from the park's warehouse to the police, the police can test the sweat in the costumes. Since none of them have worn those sets of costumes, they can get the sweat in the costumes matched to the park employees to discover whoever was trying to use them as patsies to be blamed for the crimes. Tucker, Jerry, and Sam suspect that the warehouse will be watched closely, and enlist the help of the seniors from the Haven House to help distract park operations so they can remove the costumes from the warehouse. Despite the distractions, half of park operations is already there, about to take the duplicate costumes to the incinerator. Jerry reveals that Stu told Fletcher of his suspicions, but Fletcher arrives and reveals that he was the mastermind behind the whole plan, and park operations engaged with the crimes with his blessings so he could take a cut of the money, though bank robbing was too extreme for him. The park operations employees approach Tucker, Jerry, and Sam to restrain them, but George the Janitor arrives and beats them back. The police detective enters and stops the fight. The entire park operations team and Fletcher are taken in for questioning. The police also take the costumes as evidence, so the performers make do by buying other off the shelf costumes or borrowing them from friends, though Tucker is able to use the original Hoppy the Kangaroo costume, as that one was not worn by anyone in 12 years.

After the summer is over, Stu starts a furry cosplay costume company and brings on Tucker's parents as sales agents. Jerry gets a promotion to director of entertainment at the park and the next summer creates a hit musical on Fletcher's old stage. Sam goes off to California for college, and Tucker is able to go to the California Institute of the Arts, as the grateful seniors at the Haven House all pitch in for a college fund.

== Cast ==
- Mitchel Musso as Tucker, a recent college graduate looking for a job who costumes as Hoppy the Kangaroo
- Walt Willey as Benjamin Fletcher, the General Manager of Old Time Fun Town
- Miles D. as Jerry, a coworker at Old Time Fun Town who costumes as Cap'n Jack's Parrot
- Marc Musso as Stu, a coworker at Old Time Fun Town who costumes as Paws the Polar Bear
- Ken Osmond as Daniel, an eccentric senior at the Haven House. It was Osmond's last role before his death in 2020.
- Isaac C. Singleton Jr. as Franklin Jefferson Washington, a former basketball player brought in to costume as Toby Slick the Whale
- Michael Winslow as The Detective
- Felix Silla as Don Cluff, the in-house art director of Old Time Fun Town
- Ana Eligio as Sam, a coworker at Old Time Fun Town who costumes as Billy the Bulldog

== Development ==
Major funding for the movie began with an Indiegogo campaign. US$50,032 was raised by 160 backers, with progressive benefits depending on donation. Two people chose the top level of benefit and paid $10,000 to become executive producers of the film, with David P. Pragg getting top billing in the movie's credits under Indiegogo contributors, followed by Jack Stiefel, Jean Labadie, Matthew J. Durfee, and Gregory Thies. As many of the actors worked for little pay or as free extras, most of the film's modest budget went toward catering. The movie was filmed at Old Town, Kissimmee, Florida, as well as Gatorland and Celebration, Florida. The park locations were both open for business throughout.

The film is completely live action, with animation overlay in some scenes provided by Jeffrey James and Huhu Studios in New Zealand and Shanghai. Director Jon Binkowski said “We wanted the animation to that would make the kid's talent show through, but a little amateurish because he [the character Tucker] didn't have the tools yet. We wanted him to be a young Lasseter. He has animation chops and wants to get into the theme park industry. He wants to go to CalArts."

The company MaskUS, Inc. provided most of the costumes, with the exceptions of Toby Slick the Whale, which was designed by Jeffery James, the Punk Bulldog, which was a custom character, and the costumes worn by Gino "the Husky" and "Dante the Mutt", whose costumes were personal fursuits.

The movie was co-created by Lisa Enos Smith and Jon Binkowski, who are business partners for Renaissance Entertainment, LLC. Smith said "One of my first jobs was as an 'Animal Educator' at Busch Gardens (Tampa); Jon's first job was as a costumed character at SeaWorld in San Diego." Jon Binkowski "was Wally the Walrus—this was the mid-70s—and believe me, all of the scenes (in the film) showing what it's like inside a costume, all of that is 100% real. I had kids swinging on my tusks, you name it. Then I got a promotion to Pete the Penguin and continued to work my way up the food chain...Really! It was a couple of wild summers back when I was growing up. So, yeah, Lisa and I tapped into a lot of that with the script."

== Soundtrack ==
In the film, Tucker is a big fan of the band The Moody Blues. As such, the film uses several of their songs, namely "The Other Side of Life", "I Know You're Out There Somewhere" and "Your Wildest Dreams." The songs "A New Day" was written by Miles D performed by The Band Geeks and "Forget It" and "Her Soft Spoken Voice" written and performed by Marc Musso. The music in the film was selected and arranged by Peter J. Lehman and include songs by Richard David James Heacock, Richard Ivanoff, Sergei Stern, Salvador Fornieles, Carla Olaortua, Serge Essiambre, and Matthieu Nantel.

== Reception ==
The movie was low budget and had little publicity.

Theme Park University summarized that "Characterz is that great little indie theme park film that could. It's got some great laughs, some solid performances and a heart that will make any theme park fan swoon." Film reviewer Michael Knox-Smith echoed a similar sentiment, writing "Characterz is a solid 4 star film for the family. It is cute, quirky fun and well worth watching when it comes out on 12 July via VoD. Smaller kids may find some of the jokes confusing but should find the fuzzy animals entertaining. Check it out, this movie will make you smile.
