= Janice Kent =

American actress and director

- Born: Plainfield, New Jersey, U.S.
- Occupations: Actress; director; life management coach; producer
- Years active: 1974–present
- Known for: The New Leave It to Beaver; Days of Our Lives; The Ted Knight Show
- Website: janicekent.com

Janice Kent is an American actress, director and life coach. She has appeared in roles on stage, television, and in films. Additionally, she has featured in over 150 television commercials.

== Filmography ==
=== Film ===
Year	Title	Role	Notes
2008	Keith	Mrs. Thomas	
2004	The Last Run	Mrs. Powers	
1994	The Flintstones	Stewardess	
1991	The Unborn	Cindy DeWItt	
1984	Crimes Of Passion	Patty Marshal	
1977	Kentucky Fried Movie	Barbara Duncan (segment "A.M. Today")	

=== Television series ===
Year	Title	Role	Notes
1978	The Ted Knight Show	as Cheryl (6 episodes)	
1981	Three's Company	as Cheryl Gainer (in episode titled "Make Room For Daddy" in Season 5)	
1983	Fantasy Island	as Nurse Michele in episode The Wedding Picture/Castaways	
1983	Still The Beaver (TV movie)	Mary Ellen Cleaver	
1987	Highway To Heaven (TV series)	Penny Martin in episode titled The People Next Door	
1983–1989	The New Leave It To Beaver (TV series)	Mary Ellen Cleaver (101 episodes)	
1990	Who's the Boss?	Laurie in episode titled "Parental Guidance Suggested" in Season 5)	
1991	The Story Lady (TV movie)	2nd Saleslady	
1991	Designing Women	Mrs. Friedhold in episode titled This Is Art?	
2004	ER	as Mrs. Skinner in episode titled "Damaged"	
2008	Keith	as Woman	
2009	Diary of a Single Mom	as Jewel	
