= Frank Bank =

American actor and bond broker

- Frank Bank as Lumpy Rutherford on Leave It to Beaver
- Born: Frank Bank; April 12, 1942; Los Angeles, California, U.S.
- Died: April 13, 2013 (aged 71); Rancho Mirage, California, U.S.
- Resting place: Hillside Memorial Park Cemetery
- Occupations: 1950–1963; 1983–1989; 1997
- Known for: Portraying Clarence "Lumpy" Rutherford in Leave It to Beaver, first on CBS and then on ABC
- Spouses: Marlene Kay Blau (m. 1963; div. 1965) Jeri Lynn Handelman (m. 1966; div. 1982) Rebecca Fink (m. 1982)
- Children: 4

Frank Bank (April 12, 1942 – April 13, 2013) was an American actor, particularly known for his role as Clarence "Lumpy" Rutherford on the 1957–1963 situation comedy television series Leave It to Beaver.

== Life ==
Bank was cast in 50 episodes of Leave It to Beaver between January 24, 1958 and the series finale on May 30, 1963. Thereafter, he was cast as Clarence Rutherford in 101 episodes of the series sequel, The New Leave It to Beaver, which aired on cable television from 1984 to 1989. Beginning in 1973, Bank became a bond broker in his native Los Angeles. His autobiography, Call Me Lumpy: My Leave It To Beaver Days and Other Wild Hollywood Life, was published in 1997.

Bank died of cancer on April 13, 2013, in Rancho Mirage, California, one day after his 71st birthday. He was survived by his third wife, Rebecca, four daughters, and five grandchildren. He is interred at Hillside Memorial Park Cemetery in Culver City, California.

== Filmography ==
=== Television ===
Show	Role	Year(s)
Ford Television Theatre	Clarence Miggs	1952
Father Knows Best	High schooler	1956
Leave It to Beaver	Lumpy Rutherford	1958-1963
Cimarron City	Henry Purdy	1959
Bachelor Father	Jim Estabrook	1962
87th Precinct	Punk	1962
Life with Archie	Archie	1962
Match Game/Hollywood Squares Hour	Himself	1983
High School U.S.A.	Mr. Gerardi	1983
The New Leave It to Beaver	Lumpy Rutherford	1983-1989

=== Film ===
Film	Role	Year
Cargo to Capetown		1950
The Story of Will Rogers	Young Will Rogers	1952
Leave It to Beaver	Frank	1997
