= Eddie Haskell =

Character in Leave It to Beaver

- Ken Osmond as Eddie Haskell
- First appearance: "New Neighbors" (November 1, 1957)
- Last appearance: "Family Scrapbook" (June 20, 1963)
- Portrayed by: Ken Osmond

In-universe information
- Gender: Male
- Family: George Haskell (father); Agnes Haskell (mother)
- Spouse: Gert
- Children: Freddie (son); Eddie Jr. (son)

Edward Clark Haskell (also referred to as Edward W. Haskell) is a fictional character on the American television sitcom Leave It to Beaver, which ran on CBS from October 4, 1957, to 1958 and on ABC from 1958 to 1963. He was played by Ken Osmond. The character was also featured in the later series Still the Beaver, and in the 1997 film remake of the original series.

== Character overview ==
The son of George (however, in Season 1, episode 20, Eddie gives his name as "Edward Clark Haskell, Jr.," and in Season 4 episode 26, Eddie's father introduces himself as "Frank Haskell") and Agnes, Eddie Haskell was the smart-mouthed best friend of Wally Cleaver. The character, played in the original series by Ken Osmond, has become a cultural reference, recognized as an archetype for sycophants. Ward Cleaver once remarked that "[Eddie] is so polite, it's almost un-American."

Eddie was known for his neat grooming—hiding his shallow and sneaky character. Typically, Eddie would greet his friends' parents with overdone good manners and often a compliment such as "That's a lovely dress you're wearing, Mrs. Cleaver." However, when no parents were around, Eddie was always up to no good—either conniving with his friends or picking on Wally's younger brother, Beaver, whom he regularly derided as "Squirt". "Gertrude" and "Sam" were nicknames he reserved for Wally. Eddie's duplicity was also exemplified in his efforts to curry favor by trying to talk to adults at the level he thought they would respect, such as referring to their children as Theodore (Beaver's much-disliked given name) and Wallace, even though the parents called them Beaver and Wally.

An untrustworthy wise guy, Eddie could be relied upon to concoct and instigate schemes with his friends, schemes for which they would be in the position of blame if (and frequently when) they were caught. One of his most infamous pranks with the Cleaver brothers involved fastening a chain around the rear axle of their friend Lumpy Rutherford's car, causing unplanned damage as the entire rear axle, wheels and all, became detached when Lumpy tried to move the car. The prank has been repeated on police and gangster cars in scenes in various films including American Graffiti (1973), Porky's (1981), and Gone in 60 Seconds (2000).

S4-E38 "Beaver's Doll Buggy" may explain how Eddie's scheming character came to be. He related a story from kindergarten, when a caregiver sent him to school with a home permanent hairstyle. When he told his father about it, his father made a big joke about it. Eddie claims that was the last time he told his dad anything. Then he adds, "If you can make the other guy feel like a goon first, then you don't feel so much like a goon."

One of Eddie's catchphrases is "What's up, Doc?", which is a reference to the same catchphrase said by Bugs Bunny in response to Elmer Fudd pointing his gun at him, preceded by an "Eh..." and lip smacking while eating a carrot.

=== The New Leave It to Beaver ===
In the 1980s revival series, titled The New Leave It to Beaver, Eddie is now married to Gertrude ("Gert") and they have two sons, Freddie and Edward Jr. (played by Osmond's real-life sons, Eric and Christian, respectively). Edward Jr. (nicknamed "Bomber") is enrolled at Vicksburg Military School, the result of his having spilled grape juice on the Haskells' white carpeting. Both Freddie and Bomber have adopted their father's scheming and insincere nature.

Eddie operates an eponymously named contracting company. He remains an avid Woody Woodpecker cartoon fan.

== Reception ==
In 1999, TV Guide ranked Eddie Haskell number 20 on its "50 Greatest TV Characters of All Time" list.
