= Richard Deacon (actor) =

American actor (1922–1984)

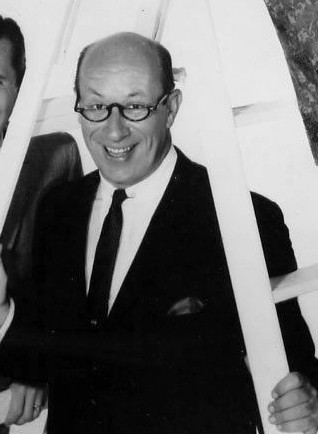
- Deacon as Mel Cooley on The Dick Van Dyke Show
- Born: Richard Lewis Deacon; May 14, 1922; Philadelphia, Pennsylvania, U.S.
- Died: August 8, 1984 (aged 62); Los Angeles, California, U.S.
- Education: Ithaca College; Bennington College
- Occupation: Actor
- Years active: 1953–1984
- Height: 6 ft 1 in (185 cm)
- Parents: Joseph Gill Deacon (father); Ethel Laughlin Deacon (mother)

Richard Lewis Deacon (May 14, 1922 – August 8, 1984) was an American television and motion picture actor, widely known for playing supporting roles in television shows such as The Dick Van Dyke Show, Leave It to Beaver, and The Jack Benny Program, along with minor roles in films such as Invasion of the Body Snatchers (1956) and Alfred Hitchcock's The Birds (1963).

== Career ==
Deacon often portrayed pompous, prissy, and/or imperious figures in film and television. He made appearances on The Jack Benny Program as a salesman and a barber, and on NBC's Happy as a hotel manager. He made a brief appearance in Alfred Hitchcock's film The Birds (1963). He played a larger role in Invasion of the Body Snatchers (1956) as a physician in the "book-end" sequences added to the beginning and end of the film after its original previews.

In Billy Wilder's 1957 film adaptation of Charles Lindbergh's The Spirit of St. Louis, Deacon portrayed the chairman of the Columbia Aircraft Corporation, Charles A. Levine.

His best-known roles are milksop Mel Cooley (producer of The Alan Brady Show) on CBS's The Dick Van Dyke Show (1961–1966) and Fred Rutherford on Leave It to Beaver (1957–1963), although Deacon played Mr. Baxter in the 1957 Beaver pilot episode "It's a Small World". He co-starred as Tallulah Bankhead's butler in an episode of The Lucy–Desi Comedy Hour called "The Celebrity Next Door". Deacon played Roger Buell on the second season of TV's The Mothers-in-Law (1967–1969), replacing Roger C. Carmel in the role. He played Principal "Jazzbo" Conroy in The Danny Thomas Show (1958). He also appeared in the 1960 Perry Mason episode The Case of the Red Riding Boots as Wilmer Beaslee.

In Carousel (1956), the film adaptation of the Rodgers & Hammerstein stage musical, Deacon had a bit role as the policeman who admonishes Julie and Mr. Bascombe about Billy Bigelow in the "bench scene". It was one of the few films in which he did not wear glasses, as were his roles in Abbott and Costello Meet the Mummy (1955), and the 1954 costumer Désirée, where he played Jean Simmons' elder brother, an 18th-century Marseilles silk merchant. Philadelphia native Deacon played the role of Morton Stearnes' butler, George Archibald, whose courtroom testimony is a turning point in The Young Philadelphians (1959), starring Paul Newman. He played an imbibing justice of the peace, Reverend Zaron, in the 1957 Budd Boetticher western Decision at Sundown.

Deacon appeared in some Westerns and many sitcoms, including It's a Great Life, The People's Choice, How to Marry a Millionaire, Guestward, Ho!, Pete and Gladys, The Donna Reed Show, Gunsmoke (he was the original actor to portray town banker, Mr. Botkin), The Real McCoys (in the episode "The Tax Man Cometh", he clashes with series star Walter Brennan over property tax assessments in the San Fernando Valley), Get Smart, Bonanza (a deceitful character who cheats the Cartwrights during their visit to San Francisco in the episode "San Francisco"), and The Rifleman (episode "The Hangman", in an uncredited role). In episode 5 of the first season of The Munsters, "Pike's Pique", he plays water district commissioner Mr. Pike, buying the underground rights to lay pipe. In The Addams Family, he administers Cousin Itt a battery of psychological tests in the episode "Cousin Itt and the Vocational Counselor". In 1966, he appeared on Phyllis Diller's short-lived television sitcom, The Pruitts of Southampton. He also guest starred in the NBC family drama National Velvet, and in the ABC/Warner Bros. crime drama Bourbon Street Beat, and played Mr. Whipple on The Twilight Zone in the 1964 episode "The Brain Center at Whipple's". In 1967, Deacon played Ralph Yarby, director of security for lumber baron D.J. Mulrooney, in Disney's The Gnome-Mobile. In 1968, he played Dean Wheaton in the Walt Disney film Blackbeard's Ghost. He was also an occasional panelist in the 1970s/early 1980s versions of Match Game. In 1970, he appeared in four episodes of The Beverly Hillbillies as a psychiatrist treating Granny.

In 1971, Deacon co-starred, along with Elaine Joyce, in the final episode of Green Acres, which was a backdoor pilot for a proposed sitcom titled "The Blonde" or "Carol". Joyce played Oliver's former "dizzy blonde" secretary, Carol Rush, who now lives in Los Angeles with her sister and brother-in-law. Deacon played her no-nonsense boss, Mr. Oglethorpe, whom Carol manages to save from a real estate scam. The pilot was not picked up.

In 1969, he co-starred on Broadway as Horace Vandergelder in the long-running musical Hello, Dolly!, reuniting him onstage with Diller, who played the title character.

Deacon appeared on the Match Game-Hollywood Squares Hour in 1983 as a game show participant / celebrity guest star.

In 1983, Deacon reprised his role of Fred Rutherford in the television movie Still the Beaver, a sequel to the original TV series. When the television movie spawned a series of the same name on The Disney Channel, he was to reprise the role but died weeks before the series began production.

In 1984, Deacon had a cameo role in the teen comedy film Bad Manners.

== Personal life ==
Deacon was born in Philadelphia, and his family later moved to Binghamton, New York, living on the west side of that city. He attended West Junior High and Binghamton Central High School, where fellow Binghamton resident Rod Serling was a classmate. After high school, he worked as an orderly at Binghamton General Hospital.

During World War II, Deacon served in the United States Army medical corps. In 1946, upon completion of his service, he returned to Binghamton. He attended Ithaca College, first as a medical student, but later developed an interest in acting. In 1949, Deacon, along with several other male actors, was admitted to Bennington College as a student/assistant in the drama department.

Deacon was a gourmet chef in addition to working as an actor. In the 1970s and 1980s, he wrote a series of cookbooks and hosted a Canadian television series on microwave oven cooking.

While not widely known during Deacon's lifetime, he was a charitable man. At his memorial service, a number of people previously unknown to Deacon's friends and colleagues spoke of how Deacon had provided for needy people and charitable organizations during his life.

According to academic writers David L. Smith and Sean Griffin, Deacon was gay, and was among "a number of actors and actresses who were closeted homosexuals" working in Hollywood and often employed in Disney films.

== Death ==
Deacon died of an apparent heart attack on August 8, 1984, at age 62. His remains were cremated and the ashes scattered at sea.

== Filmography ==
=== Film ===
Year	Title	Role	Notes
1953	Invaders from Mars	MP	Uncredited
1954	Them!	Bald Reporter	Uncredited
1954	Shield for Murder	The Professor	Uncredited
1954	Private Hell 36	Mr. Mace	Uncredited
1954	Rogue Cop	Stacey	Uncredited
1954	Désirée	Etienne Clary	Uncredited
1954	Cry Vengeance	Shiny Sam	Uncredited
1955	Prince of Players	Theater Manager	Uncredited
1955	Blackboard Jungle	Mr. Stanley	Uncredited
1955	This Island Earth	Pilot	Uncredited
1955	Abbott and Costello Meet the Mummy	Semu	
1955	Lay That Rifle Down	Glover Speckleton	
1955	My Sister Eileen	Baker's Receptionist	Uncredited
1955	Good Morning, Miss Dove	Mr. Spivvy	Uncredited
1956	Invasion of the Body Snatchers	Dr. Harvey Bassett	Uncredited
1956	Carousel	First Policeman	Uncredited
1956	Hot Blood	Mr. Swift	Uncredited
1956	The Kettles in the Ozarks	Big Trout	Uncredited
1956	When Gangland Strikes	Dixon Brackett	Uncredited
1956	The Scarlet Hour	Mr. Elman	Uncredited
1956	The Proud Ones	Barber	Uncredited
1956	Francis in the Haunted House	Jason	
1956	The Solid Gold Cadillac	Williams	Uncredited
1956	The Power and the Prize	Howard Carruthers	
1956	Spring Reunion	Sidney	Uncredited
1957	Affair in Reno	H.L. Denham	
1957	The Spirit of St. Louis	Charles Levine	Uncredited
1957	Designing Woman	Larry Musso	Uncredited
1957	My Man Godfrey	Farnsworth	
1957	Decision at Sundown	Rev. Zaron	
1957	Kiss Them for Me	Bill Hotchkiss	Uncredited
1958	The High Cost of Loving	Obstetrician	Uncredited
1958	A Nice Little Bank That Should Be Robbed	Milburn Schroeder	
1958	The Last Hurrah	Graves	Uncredited
1959	The Remarkable Mr. Pennypacker	Sheriff	
1959	The Young Philadelphians	George Archibald	
1959	It Started with a Kiss	Capt. Porter	Uncredited
1959	The Man Who Understood Women	Rossi	Uncredited
1959	A Summer Place	Pawnbroker	Uncredited
1959	-30-	Chapman	
1960	North to Alaska	Angus	Uncredited
1961	All in a Night's Work	Fur Salesman	Uncredited
1961	Everything's Ducky	Dr. Deckham	
1961	Lover Come Back	Dr. Melnick	Uncredited
1962	That Touch of Mink	Mr. Miller	Uncredited
1963	Critic's Choice	Harvey Rittenhouse	
1963	The Birds	Mitch's Neighbor	
1963	Who's Minding the Store?	Tie Salesman	
1963	The Raiders	Commissioner Mailer	
1964	The Patsy	Sy Devore	
1965	John Goldfarb, Please Come Home!	Sec. of Defense Charles Maginot	
1965	Billie	Principal Wilson	
1965	That Darn Cat!	Drive-in Manager	
1966	Don't Worry, We'll Think of a Title	Mr. Travis	
1966	Lt. Robin Crusoe, U.S.N.	Narrator	Uncredited; voice only
1967	Enter Laughing	Pike	
1967	The Gnome-Mobile	Ralph Yarby	
1967	The King's Pirate	Swaine	
1968	Blackbeard's Ghost	Dean Roland Wheaton	
1968	The One and Only, Genuine, Original Family Band	Charlie Wrenn	
1968	Lady in Cement	Arnie Sherwin	
1974	The Man from Clover Grove	Charlie Strange	
1978	Rabbit Test	Newscaster	
1978	Piranha	Earl Lyon	
1980	The Happy Hooker Goes Hollywood	Joseph Rottman	
1984	Bad Manners	Ticket Salesman	

=== Television ===
Year	Title	Role	Notes
1954	Four Star Playhouse	Dr. Constanti	Episode: "The Long Count"
1954	The Public Defender	Truant Officer	Episode: "Step Child"
1954	Topper	Judge	Episode: "Preparations for Europe"
1954–1956	The George Burns and Gracie Allen Show	First Man/Mr. Dayton	2 episodes
1954–1956	It's a Great Life	Clerk/Dr. Randall/Dr. Irwin/Dr. Brannigan	4 episodes
1955	The Man Behind the Badge	Rev. Edgefield	Episode: "The Case of the Tattooed Man"
1955	Stage 7	Dr. Mathews/Dr. Constanti	2 episodes
1955	Damon Runyon Theater		Episode: "Lonely Heart"
1955	Screen Directors Playhouse	Hotel Clerk	Uncredited; Episode: "Life of Vernon Hathaway"
1955	The Ford Television Theatre	Peter O'Toole/Slim Bailey	2 episodes
1955	The Millionaire	Jeweler	Episode: "The Luke Fortune Story"
1955	The Great Gildersleeve	Matthew Walker	Episode: "Gildy Goes Diving"
1955–1956	Schlitz Playhouse	Dr. Thomas Gregory	2 episodes
1955–1956	Lux Video Theatre	Van Cassell/Norton/Salambro/Sheldon	4 episodes
1955–1958	The People's Choice	Dr. Sidney Baxter/Homer	3 episodes
1956	Telephone Time		Episode: "Captain from Kopenick"
1956	Private Secretary	Waiter/Doorman	2 episodes
1956	December Bride	James/Bud Hodges	2 episodes
1956	Crossroads		Episode: "The Rabbi Davis Story"
1956	The Charles Farrell Show	Sherman Hall	Main cast; 12 episodes
1956–1957	The Life of Riley	Chauffer/Tree Surgeon/Actor	3 episodes
1956–1961	The Danny Thomas Show	John Savich/Principal Conroy/Dr. Stanley Patman/Assistant Manager	4 episodes
1956–1962	The Jack Benny Program	Various	8 episodes
1956–1963	The Red Skelton Show	Various	7 episodes
1957	Gunsmoke	Botkin	Episode: "Pucket's New Year"
1957	The Bob Cummings Show	District Attorney	Episode: "Eleven Angry Women"
1957	The Millionaire	Gibson	Episode: "The Professor Amberson Adams Story"
1957	Studio 57	Mr. Baxter	Episode: "It's a Small World"
1957	The Gale Storm Show	Artist	Uncredited; Episode: "The Partisan Touch"
1957	Navy Log	Al Carder/Captain Twohig	2 episodes
1957	The 20th Century Fox Hour	Paul Erickson	Episode: "The Great American Hoax"
1957	The Lucy–Desi Comedy Hour	Winslow	Episode: "The Celebrity Next Door"
1957–1958	Date with the Angels	Roger Finley	6 episodes
1957–1959	The Gale Storm Show	Artist/Zonko	2 episodes
1957–1963	Leave It to Beaver	Fred Rutherford	23 episodes
1958	Annette	Dr. Archie McCloud	13 episodes
1958	Tales of Wells Fargo	Sam Potter	Episode: "The Gambler"
1958	The Silent Service	Wheeler B. Lipes	Episode: "Operation Seadragon"
1958	The Ed Wynn Show	Conway	Episode: "Lover's Lone"
1958	How to Marry a Millionaire	Kranz	Episode: "Loco Goes to Night School"
1959	Bachelor Father	Mr. Haris	Episode: "Bentley's Economy Wave"
1959	The Thin Man	Mr. Peabody	Episode: "Black Wind and Lightning"
1959	Colonel Humphrey Flack	Professor Brookhouse/Evans	2 episodes
1959	Zorro	Father Ignacio	Uncredited; Episode: "Senor China Boy"
1959	Maverick	Floyd Gimbel	Episode: "The Cats of Paradise"
1959	Shotgun Slade		Episode: "The Safe Crackers"
1959–1951	The Adventures of Ozzie and Harriet	Mr. Crawford/Desk Clerk	2 episodes
1959–1962	The Donna Reed Show	Mr. Johnson/Mr. Conroy/Mr. Heflin/Mr. Moorhead	4 episodes
1959–1962	The Real McCoys	Mr. Wells/Mr. Laidlaw/Mr. Milton	3 episodes
1960	Alcoa Theatre	Michael Gilmore	Episode: "The Silent Kill"
1960	The Untouchables	Bill Skidmore	Episode: "The Unhired Assassin: Part 1"
1960	Bourbon Street Beat	Philipe Duvere	Episode: "Neon Nightmare"
1960	Bonanza	Captain Shark	Episode: "San Francisco"
1960	The Many Loves of Dobie Gillis	Cecil Ellingboe	Episode: "That's Show Biz"
1960	The Rifleman	Col. Jebediah Sims	Uncredited; Episode: "The Hangman"
1960	M Squad	Raleigh King	Episode: "Fire in the Sky"
1960	Happy	Hotel Manager	Episode: "Help Wanted"
1960	My Three Sons	Elderly Man	Episode: "Adjust or Bust"
1960	77 Sunset Strip	Wallace Friend	Episode: "The Duncan Shrine"
1960	Perry Mason	Wilmer Beaslee	Episode: "The Case of the Red Riding Boots"
1961	Guestward, Ho!	Mr. Andrews	Episode: "Too Many Cooks"
1961	National Velvet	Forsythe	Episode: "The Riding Mistress"
1961	Mister Ed	Dr. Gordon	Episode: "Psychoanalyst Show"
1961	Hawaiian Eye	Funeral Director	Episode: "Two for the Money"
1961–1962	Pete and Gladys	Foster/Busby	2 epidoes
1961–1964	Mister Ed	Various	6 episodes
1961–1966	The Dick Van Dyke Show	Mel Cooley	Regular role; 82 episodes
1962	87th Precinct	Martin	Episode: "The Pigeon"
1962	Follow the Sun	Lester Markel	Episode: "The Inhuman Equation"
1962	The Dick Powell Theatre	John Fiske	Episode: "The Boston Terrier"
1962	Wagon Train	Mayor Hadden	Episode: "The Madame Sagittarius Story"
1962	McKeever and the Colonel	Capt. Stadish	Episode: "The Bugle Sounds"
1963–1964	My Favorite Martian	James J. Jackson/Mr. Bentley	2 episodes
1964	The Twilight Zone	Wallace V. Whipple	Episode: "The Brain Center at Whipple's"
1964	The Munsters	Borden T. Pike	Episode: "Pike's Pique"
1964	The Chrysler Theatre	Himself	Episode: "Have Girls, Will Travel"
1965	The Addams Family	Mortimer Phelps	Episode: "Cousin Itt and the Vocational Counselor"
1966	The Farmer's Daughter	John Pilgrim	Episode: "Have You Ever Thought of Building"
1966	The Carol Channing Show	Leon Thatcher	Unsold pilot
1966–1967	The Pruitts of Southampton	Mr. Baldwin	6 episodes
1967	Rango	Pennypacker	Episode: "What's a Nice Girl Like You Doing Holding Up a Place Like This?"
1967	The Danny Thomas Hour	Witherspoon	Episode: "Instant Money"
1967	I Dream of Jeannie	Harley Z. Pool	Episode: "Who Are You Calling a Genie?"
1967–1969	The Bob Hope Show	Himself	2 episodes
1967–1970	The Beverly Hillbillies	Mr. Brubaker/Dr. George Klinger	5 episodes
1968	The Jackie Gleason Show	Dr. Henry Rankin	Episode: "The Honeymooners: Sleepy Time Gal"
1968–1969	The Mothers-In-Law	Roger Buell	Main role; 26 episodes
1969	The Good Guys	Fogarty	Episode: "The Eyes Have It"
1969	Get Smart	Doctor	Uncredited; Episode: "And Baby Makes Four: Part 2"
1969	Arsenic and Old Lace	Mr. Benner	Television film
1969–1972	Love, American Style	Boyd Daniels/Charlie/Charles Furman	3 episodes
1971	Green Acres	Mr. Oglethorpe	Episode: "The Ex-Secretary"
1971–1972	Here's Lucy	Harvey Hoople/Elmer Zellerbach	2 episodes
1972	Owen Marshall, Counselor at Law	Resort Manager	Episode: "The Color of Respect"
1972–1975	McMillan & Wife	Peter Childs/Luther Dorfman	2 episodes
1973	Night Gallery	Man with Mallet	Episode: "How to Cure the Common Vampire"
1975	The Lost Saucer	Mr. Kroog	Episode: "My Fair Robot"
1976	Maude	Col. Reikert	Episode: "Tuckahoe Bicentennial"
1977	CHiPs	Singleton	Episode: "Career Day"
1978	Getting Married	Wedding Director	Television film
1979	What's Happening!!	Mr. Bradford	Episode: "A Present for Dee"
1979	The Misadventures of Sheriff Lobo	Sheriff Masters	Episode: "Run for the Money: Part 3"
1979	B. J. and the Bear	Sheriff Masters	4 episodes
1980	Comedy is Not Pretty	King of Cey What	Television special
1980	Murder Can Hurt You	Mr. Burnice	Television film
1981	No Man's Valley	Panda	Television film
1981–1983	Trapper John, M.D.	Reverend Perkins/Fred Zisk	2 episodes
1982	Romance Theatre		5 episodes
1982	The Love Boat	Dr. Yates	Episode: "The Groupies/The Audition/Doc's Nephew"
1983	Alice	R.J. Meyerson	Episode: "The Grass Is Always Greener"
1983	Still the Beaver	Fred Rutherford	Television film
1984	The Hoboken Chicken Emergency	City Council Member	Television film
