= Thrown into Exile =

American metal band

Thrown Into Exile
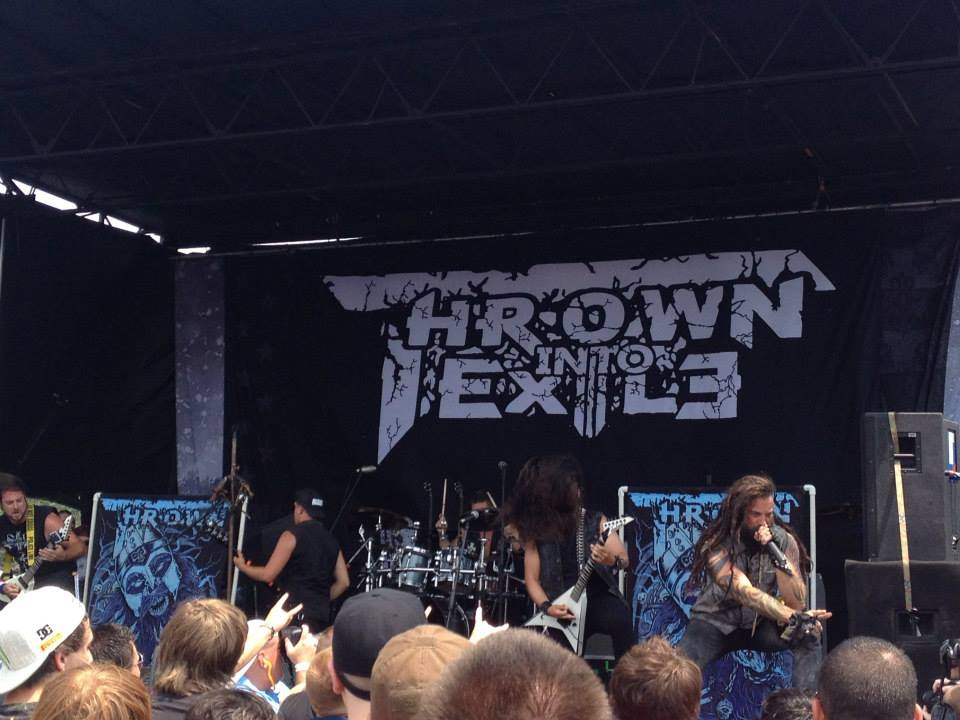
- Thrown Into Exile at Rockstar Mayhem Festival 2013

Background information
- Origin: Los Angeles, California, U.S.
- Genre: Heavy metal
- Years active: 2011–present
- Members: Mario Rubio; Javier Quinto; Austin Monzon; Hank Lin; Joshua Santos
- Past members: Evan Seidlitz; Colin Reed; Erik Tisinger; Chase Brickenden; Ray Sanchez; Dave Corsile; Henry Derek; Zac Morris; Joey Dalo; Scott Shelko; Tom Tierney; Edwin Haroutonian
- Website: Thrown into Exile on Facebook

Thrown Into Exile is an American heavy metal band from Los Angeles. They got their first break in 2012 when they were able to win the "Road to Mayhem" competition to secure a slot performing on the same bill as bands Slipknot, Motörhead, Anthrax, and Slayer. The band has opened for a number of notable bands including Sepultura, Fear Factory, Chimaira, All Shall Perish, Testament, Morbid Angel, and more.

== Touring ==
In 2012, Thrown Into Exile toured on the Rockstar Mayhem Festival, the Summer Slaughter tour and the California Metalfest, as well as opening slots for Testament, Fear Factory and Sepultura. The band worked on their debut four-song 2013 EP with producer Mike Spreitzer of the band DevilDriver. In 2012, the band got connected with the people from Mayhem Festival when they did the Headbang for the Highway contest to win a spot on the Sumerian Stage. They won the battle of the bands to open up the Sumerian Stage for the first day in San Bernardino of Mayhem Fest.

In April 2025, Thrown Into Exile embarked on the opening slot of The Blood Dynasty Tour, supporting Baest, Fit For An Autopsy, and Arch Enemy, covering North America.

== Debut EP, Mayhem Festival, and lineup changes (2013–present) ==
The band's Thrown into Exile debut EP was released on April 2, 2013, via iTunes, and Amazon. The EP was produced by DevilDriver guitarist Mike Spreitzer. For summer 2013, the band returned to the Rockstar Mayhem Festival, but as an official touring band for the entire tour. They shared the stage with headliners Rob Zombie, Five Finger Death Punch, Mastodon, and Machine head. Sirius Radio Liquid Metal channel has been playing and supporting their first single Not Alone all summer long and have been receiving constant requests to play it.

The band has been working on their debut full-length album due out in 2014. According to Evan's Facebook, he said they already have about 7 songs finished, and that they were shopping around for the right label to sign to before they release it.

On November 16, 2013, it was announced that Chase, Erik, Evan, and Colin will no longer be in Thrown into Exile due to musical differences, leaving Mario the only original member left. In May 2014, it was announced that the four members formed a new band called Grimace.

On December 23, 2014, it was announced that Henry Derek, the current vocalist for Act of Defiance and former vocalist for Scar the Martyr, was the band's new vocalist. The band also released a new song titled "Restore the Truth", which features former DevilDriver drummer John Boecklin. A few days later, the rest of the band lineup was also revealed.

On October 19, 2024, the band announced their new EP, Passageways, would be released on November 15.

== Influences ==
The band have cited an array of influences including Children of Bodom, Machine Head, Amon Amarth, Rob Zombie, Black Sabbath, Metallica, Pantera, Slayer, Anthrax, Megadeth, In Flames, Fear Factory, Soilwork, Slipknot, Danzig, Misfits, Dimmu Borgir, Bathory, Mayhem, Satyricon, Testament, Killswitch Engage, As I Lay Dying, Trivium, DevilDriver, and Lamb of God as their artistic influences.

In an interview, guitarist Mario Rubio had stated on behalf of the bands influences as: "I mean the list goes on and on and on! But there's also stuff outside of metal, our drummer Chase comes from a jazz, funk, & R&B background and I really enjoy listening to Louis Prima, Dean Martin, Depeche Mode, Morrissey, The Smiths, Frank Sinatra etc.

Former vocalist Evan Seidlitz has also cited that his vocal style, image, and stage performance is influenced by Björn Strid of Soilwork, Satyr of Satyricon, and Shagrath of Dimmu Borgir.

== Band members ==
Current

- Mario Rubio – lead guitar (2011–present)
- Javier Quinto – bass (2022–present)
- Austin Monzon – rhythm guitar (2023–present)
- Hank Lin – drums (2025–present)
- Joshua Santos – vocals (2026–present)

Former

- Evan Seidlitz – vocals (2011–2013, 2023–2026)
- Colin Reed – rhythm guitar (2011–2013)
- Erik Tisinger – bass (2011–2013)
- Chase Brickenden – drums (2011–2013)
- Ray Sanchez – rhythm guitar (2014–2023)
- Dave Corsile – bass (2014–2022) (died 2023)
- Henry Derek Elis – vocals (2014–2017)
- Zac Morris – drums (2014–2017)
- Joey Dalo – vocals (2017–2022)
- Scott Shelko – drums (2017–2020)
- Tom Tierney – drums (2020–2025)
- Edwin Haroutonian – vocals (2022–2023)

== Discography ==
=== Studio albums ===
- Safe Inside (2016)
- II: Illusion of Control (2020)

=== EPs ===
- Thrown into Exile (2013)
- Passageways (2024)

=== Singles ===
Year	Title	Album
2013	"Not Alone"	Thrown into Exile
2017	"The Wronged"	Non-album single
2020	"The Mourning"	Non-album single

=== Music videos ===
Year	Title	Director
2013	Not Alone	Fabio Jafet

== Non-album tracks ==
- Realizing Fate
- Monster
- The Enemy
