= Tiger Fafara =

American actor

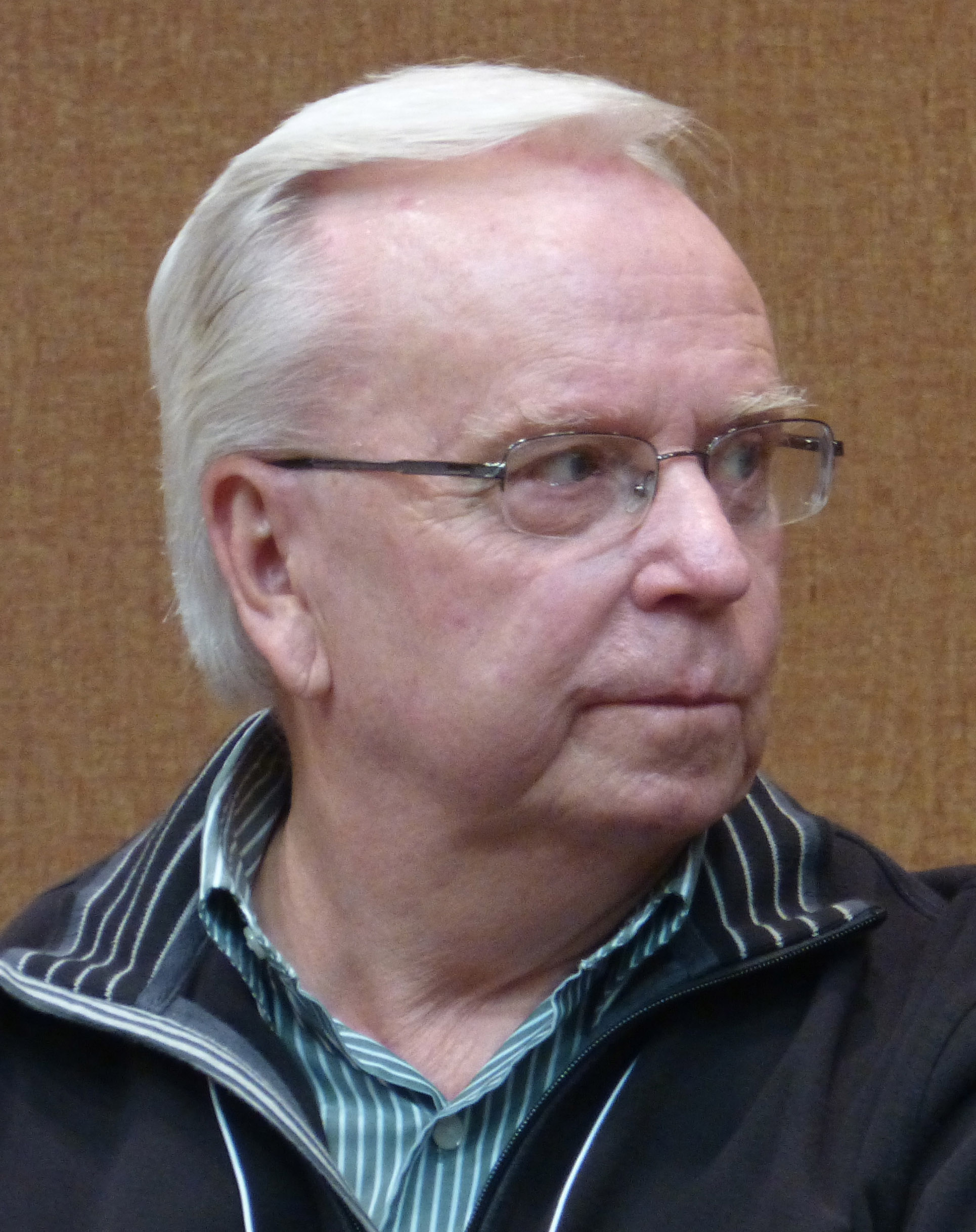
- Fafara in 2013
- Born: Lucas Stanley Fafara II; January 3, 1945 (age 80); San Francisco, California, U.S.
- Occupation: Actor
- Years active: 1955–1961; 1983–1987
- Children: Dez Fafara
- Relatives: Stanley Fafara (brother)

Lucas "Luke" Fafara II (born January 3, 1945), also known as Tiger Fafara, is a former American child actor best known for portraying the role of "Tooey Brown" on the sitcom Leave It to Beaver.

== Career ==
Born in San Francisco, California, Fafara is the older brother of Stanley Fafara. Both boys were raised in Studio City, Los Angeles and began acting in film and television in the mid-1950s. Both were hired to appear on Leave It to Beaver after their mother took them to an open casting call. "Tiger" Fafara was cast as "Tooey Brown," a friend of Wally Cleaver, while Stanley was cast as Beaver Cleaver's friend Hubert "Whitey" Whitney.

Besides appearing on Leave It to Beaver, Fafara appeared in episodes of various television series including Schlitz Playhouse of Stars, Private Secretary, Lassie, The Adventures of Rin Tin Tin, Make Room for Daddy, The Donna Reed Show, Wagon Train, and My Three Sons. He also had minor roles in the 1955 drama Good Morning, Miss Dove (Fafara and his brother Stanley portrayed the role of the same character as a child) and the 1957 melodrama All Mine to Give. Fafara left Leave It to Beaver in 1960 and stopped acting professionally in 1961.

Fafara returned to acting in 1983 with an appearance as the adult Tooey Brown in the television reunion film Still the Beaver. He reprised the role in the follow-up sitcom The New Leave It to Beaver, from 1983 to 1987.

== Personal life ==
He is the father of Dez Fafara, the vocalist of heavy metal bands DevilDriver and Coal Chamber.

== Filmography ==
Year	Title	Role	Notes
1953	The Hank McCune Show		October 25, 1953 episode
1954	Cavalcade of America		Episode: "Man of Glass: The Story of a Glassmaker"
1954	Schlitz Playhouse of Stars		Episode: "The Plugged Nickel"
1954	Four Star Playhouse		2 episodes
1955	Good Morning, Miss Dove	Fred Makepeace - Age 12	Uncredited
1955	Fireside Theater	Horace	Episode: "Woman at Sea"
1955	Screen Directors Playhouse	Bobby	Episode: "Rookie of the Year"
1955	TV Reader's Digest	Second Wise Man	Episode: "When the Wise Men Appeared"
1955	Climax!		Episode: "The Day They Gave Babies Away"
1956	I Led Three Lives	Joe Lawrence	Episode: "Historical Society"
1956	Private Secretary	Dickie Darling	Episode: "Old Dog, New Tricks"
1956	My Friend Flicka	Tuck	2 episodes
1956	Lassie	Schoolboy	Episode: "Friendship"
1956-1957	The Adventures of Rin Tin Tin	Alfred; Buddy	2 episodes
1957	Make Room for Daddy	Eddie - Boy at Orphanage	Episode: "The Orphan Asylum"
1957	All Mine to Give	Bit part	Uncredited
1957	Telephone Time	Jimmy Branting	Episode: "Stranded"
1957	The Life and Legend of Wyatt Earp	Benny Burkett	Episode: "The Good and Perfect Gift"
1957-1960	Leave It to Beaver	Tooey Brown	19 episodes
1958	Wagon Train	Johnny O'Malley	Episode: "The Luke O'Malley Story"
1958	M Squad	Tommy	Episode: "The Long Ride"
1958	Shirley Temple's Storybook		Episode: "The Legend of Sleepy Hollow"
1959	Law of the Plainsman	Roy Garnett	Episode: "The Hostiles"
1960	The Donna Reed Show	Charlie	Episode: "Pickles for Charity"
1961	My Three Sons	Roger	Episode: "Fire Watch"
1983	Still the Beaver	Tooey Brown	Television movie Credited as Luke Fafara
1983-1987	The New Leave It to Beaver	Tooey Brown	3 episodes Credited as Luke "Tiger" Fafara
