= Dealing with Demons I =

Studio album by DevilDriver
- Released: October 2, 2020
- Genre: Groove metal
- Length: 39:27
- Label: Napalm
- Producer: Steve Evetts; Mike Spreitzer

DevilDriver chronology
Outlaws 'til the End: Vol. 1 (2018)	Dealing with Demons I (2020)	Dealing with Demons Vol. II (2023)

Dealing with Demons I is the ninth studio album by American heavy metal band DevilDriver. It was released on October 2, 2020, by Napalm Records. The album marks the first part of the Dealing with Demons duology.

== Background and promotion ==
On April 9, 2018, it was reported that DevilDriver had 48 songs written for a new concept double album, with Fafara stating "this will be the record of our career". The band had been planning on narrowing down the songs to "20 or 22" and enter the studio in June 2018. In January 2019, Fafara posted on Instagram that he had begun tracking vocals for the new albums and that a summer 2019 release should be expected. In July 2019, Fafara announced that the first part of the double album should be expected in early 2020 with the second part in 2021.

On May 21, 2020, the first part of a double album was announced, Dealing with Demons I, with the release date set on October 9, 2020, but pushed ahead by a week. The first single, "Keep Away from Me", was released on the same day as the announcement.

== Track listing ==
No.	Title	Length
1.	"Keep Away from Me"	4:18
2.	"Vengeance is Clear"	3:34
3.	"Nest of Vipers"	3:57
4.	"Iona"	4:15
5.	"Wishing"	4:19
6.	"You Give Me a Reason to Drink" (featuring Simon Blade Fafara)	3:57
7.	"Witches"	3:09
8.	"Dealing with Demons"	4:16
9.	"The Damned Don't Cry"	3:35
10.	"Scars Me Forever"	4:06
Total length:		39:27

== Personnel ==
DevilDriver

- Dez Fafara – vocals
- Mike Spreitzer – lead guitar, bass, programming
- Neal Tiemann – rhythm guitar, bass
- Austin D'Amond – drums

== Charts ==
Chart (2020)	Peak position
Austrian Albums (Ö3 Austria)	64
Belgian Albums (Ultratop Wallonia)	133
German Albums (Offizielle Top 100)	61
Swiss Albums (Schweizer Hitparade)	84
