= Dealing with Demons Vol. II =

Studio album by DevilDriver
- Released: May 12, 2023
- Genre: Groove metal
- Length: 36:20
- Label: Napalm
- Producer: Steve Evetts

DevilDriver chronology
| Dealing with Demons I (2020) | Dealing with Demons Vol. II (2023) | Strike and Kill (2026) |

Dealing with Demons Vol. II is the tenth studio album by American heavy metal band DevilDriver. It was released on May 12, 2023, by Napalm Records. The album marks the second and last part of the Dealing with Demons duology. It is also the last album to feature guitarists Mike Spreitzer, Neal Tiemann, and drummer Austin D'Amond.

At 36 minutes, Dealing with Demons Vol. II is DevilDriver's shortest album.

== Background and promotion ==
On April 9, 2018, it was reported that DevilDriver had 48 songs written for a new concept double album, with Fafara stating "this will be the record of our career". The band had been planning on narrowing down the songs to "20 or 22" and enter the studio in June 2018. In January 2019, Fafara posted on Instagram that he had begun tracking vocals for the new albums and that a summer 2019 release should be expected. In July 2019, Fafara announced that the first part of the double album should be expected in early 2020 with the second part in 2021.

On March 7, 2023, the band announced that Dealing with Demons Vol. II would be released on May 12.

== Track listing ==
| No. | Title | Length |
|---|---|---|
| 1. | "I Have No Pity" | 4:29 |
| 2. | "Mantra" | 3:11 |
| 3. | "Nothing Lasts Forever" | 4:15 |
| 4. | "Summoning" | 3:34 |
| 5. | "Through the Depths" | 4:45 |
| 6. | "Bloodbath" | 3:37 |
| 7. | "It's a Hard Truth" | 3:44 |
| 8. | "If Blood Is Life" | 4:00 |
| 9. | "This Relationship, Broken" | 4:45 |
| Total length: | | 36:20 |

== Personnel ==
DevilDriver

- Dez Fafara – vocals
- Mike Spreitzer – lead guitar, bass, programming
- Neal Tiemann – rhythm guitar, bass
- Austin D'Amond – drums
