= Garrett Price =

American cartoonist

- Born: William Garrett Price; November 21, 1896; Bucyrus, Kansas, U.S.
- Died: April 8, 1979 (aged 82); Norwalk, Connecticut, U.S.
- Occupation(s): Cartoonist and illustrator
- Spouse: Florence Semler (m. 1928; died 1973)

William Garrett Price (November 21, 1896 – April 8, 1979) was an American artist, cartoonist and illustrator. He is notable for cartoons and cover illustrations in The New Yorker and for children's book illustrations.

== Early life and education ==
Born in Bucyrus, Kansas, Price was reared on a farm in Saratoga, Wyoming, the son of a horse-and-buggy doctor. He began sketching animals and people as a boy, and attended the University of Wyoming. The University library holds a collection of his work. He went on to study art at the Art Institute of Chicago where he became friends with fellow New Yorker cartoonists Perry Barlow, Alice Harvey and Helen E. Hokinson.

Price married Florence Semler (died 1973) of Latrobe, Pennsylvania. They lived in Westport, Connecticut and had a summer home on Mason's Island at the mouth of the Mystic River, in Stonington, Connecticut where their friend, the artist Herbert Stoops, also summered.

== Career ==
Price's first job was as a reporter-cartoonist for The Kansas City Star, he went on to draw illustrations and a full-page comic strip for the Chicago Tribune. He served in World War I as a contributing artist for Navy publications.

== The New Yorker ==
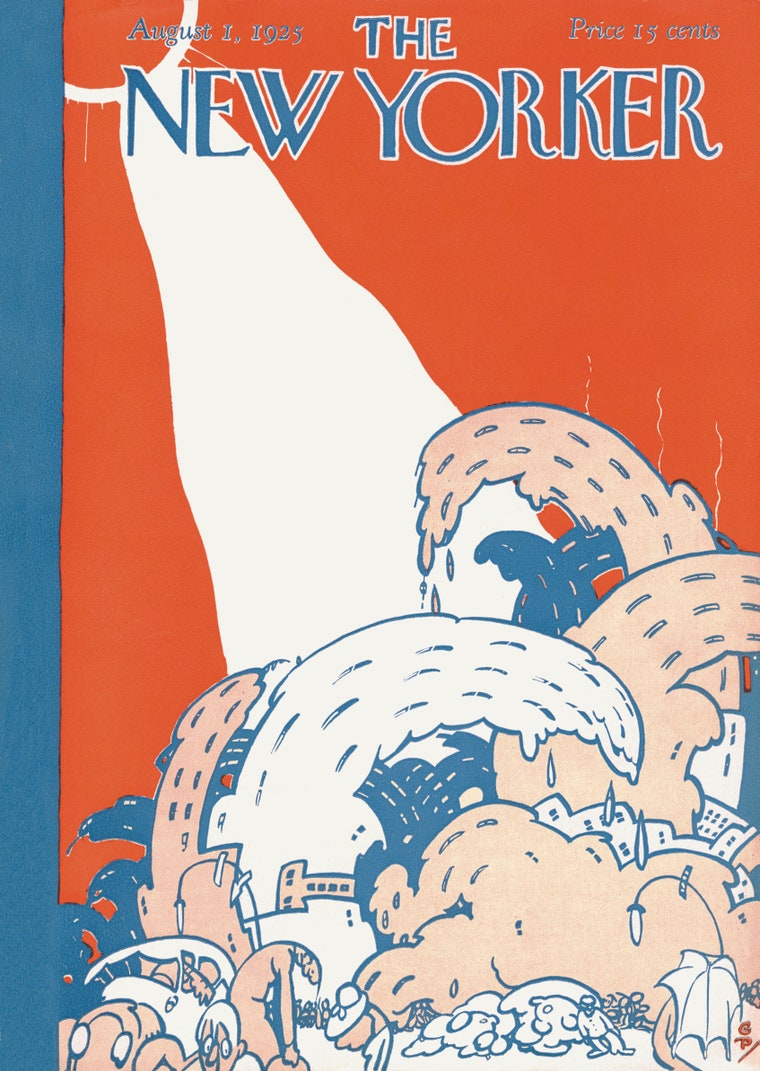
Price's first cover for The New Yorker (August 1, 1925)

Price worked for over half a century for The New Yorker, drawing hundreds of cartoons and 100 covers, including two in 1925, the monthly magazine's first year ("Heat Wave", August 1, and "Paris Café", August 29).

Thomas Powers describes the Price covers in later decades as sometimes possessing "a stunning, wistful beauty", flagging, in particular, "a 1956 cover of circus queens riding elephants into the ring, a 1949 cover of a boy all alone on a spring ball field sliding into home plate, and a 1951 cover of autumn leaves falling over a summer house being closed for the winter—a husband sits waiting in the car as his wife gathers a last armful of flowers." His last cover appeared in the summer of 1973, the year his wife died.

== Books ==
Drawing Room Only (1946) is a collection of Price's work, principally featuring New Yorker cartoons.

In 2016 Sunday Press Books published Price's Chicago Tribune comic strip as a book entitled White Boy in Skull Valley. The strip, which began in the fall of 1933 and was called White Boy, featured a skinny white boy captured and adopted by an Indian tribe unfamiliar with modern culture and technology. The love interest was an intrepid girl named Starlight but called "Little Squaw" who was described by Thomas Powers in his 2016 essay on Price in The New York Review of Books as having "kissable lips of the Clara Bow sort" and "White Boy’s full attention". About halfway thorough its 3-year life of about 150 issues, the strip shifted into a more contemporary if still mythical West, the characters lost their distinctively Indian customs and dress, the strip was renamed Skull Valley, and "Little Squaw" renamed Doris, now wearing jodhpurs and boots.

== Books illustrated ==
- Husbands Are Difficult or The Book of Oliver Ames (1941) by Phyllis McGinley
- While Mrs. Coverlet Was Away (1958) by Mary Nash
- Mrs. Coverlet's Magicians (1960) by Mary Nash
- Mrs. Coverlet's Detectives (1965) by Mary Nash
- The Finer Things of Life (1951) by Frances Gray Patton (Dodd, Mead and Company)
- Good Morning, Miss Dove (1954) by Frances Gray Patton (Dodd, Mead)
