= Beast (DevilDriver album) =

Studio album by DevilDriver
- Released: February 22, 2011
- Studios: Sonic Ranch, Tornillo, Texas
- Genres: Groove metal, melodic death metal
- Length: 55:01
- Label: Roadrunner
- Producers: Mark Lewis, DevilDriver

DevilDriver chronology
Pray for Villains (2009)	Beast (2011)	Winter Kills (2013)

Singles from Beast
- 1. "Dead to Rights" Released: January 10, 2011

Alternative cover
- Special edition

Professional ratings
Aggregate scores
Source	Rating
Metacritic	79/100
Review scores
Source	Rating
About.com	4/5 stars
AllMusic	3.5/5 stars
Blabbermouth.net	8.5/10
The Boston Phoenix	3/4 stars
PopMatters	7/10
Revolver	4/5
Rock Sound	8/10

Beast is the fifth studio album by American heavy metal band DevilDriver. It was released on February 22, 2011 in the United States. Up until Strike and Kill (2026), it is also their last album to feature longtime bassist Jon Miller who left in 2011 but would return to the band a decade later in 2022. It is also their last studio album to be released through Roadrunner Records.

Beast sold an over 11,000 copies in the United States in its first week of release to debut at number 42 on the Billboard 200 chart.

== Recording and production ==
Beast was recorded at Sonic Ranch studios in Tornillo, Texas; and was produced by Mark Lewis.

"The record is extreme," vocalist Dez Fafara told Revolver magazine. "And it attacks from start to finish. If you liked [2007's] The Last Kind Words, this is like that on steroids and crank, driving a Buick Skylark 200 miles an hour straight to Vegas." "I felt like I was waking up and experiencing a moment of clarity that brought out all these pissed off, negative emotions," Fafara said of making the album. "It's an all-out release of pain. "It's been a beast of a year and a half, and it's still going," he added. Regarding the new album's musical direction, drummer John Boecklin stated, "It's interesting to me—it's not the fastest shit we have done, nor the slowest, [but it] just [has] lots of groove. But to me, when people say 'it's got groove,' I think it's a nice way of saying simple and boring these days. We wanted to avoid this. "Our record has a great contrast of dark riffs, stomp bouncing drums with the right amount of blasts and double bass, and outstanding vocal delivery from Dez that takes it past your average approach of the metal attempt. I'm not talking about reinventing the wheel or nothing. I just think our new album sits in its own corner from any of our other albums."

The band recorded 14 songs during the Beast sessions, with 12 tracks making the standard version of the CD and all 14 songs appearing on the special edition.

The special edition also includes the band's documentary You May Know Us from the Stage and official music videos spanning DevilDriver's career thus far.

== Promotion and release ==
The first single, "Dead to Rights", was released on January 10, 2011. The online Beast E-Team created by Daniel Wells and Sean Smith was mostly responsible for crashing Roadrunner Records systems on January 10, 2011, when "Dead to Rights" was released for download.

A second track, "Coldblooded" was posted on January 28.

On January 31, a new track "Bring the Fight (To the Floor)" was posted though Revolver magazine as a "Revolver Bootleg series". Revolver also interviewed frontman Dez Fafara about the song:

Two things, really. When you're tired or someone is running their mouth, so you say, "Fuck it. Let's bring this fight to the floor..." and the obvious "Get in the pit." [...] The chorus was the first; the inspiration was the same as above. [...] Lyrically, this thing poured outta me. The record itself had some trying moments. [...] Feedback about the record has been great and we are all pleased, as we worked very hard on this effort.

French site jeuxactu.com got the exclusive for "Talons Out (Teeth Sharpened)", another track from the album, on February 4.

The metal-specialized site MetalSucks got an exclusive to the music video of the first single "Dead to Rights" on February 9, the first music video from the album.

Another song, "You Make Me Sick", was made available for streaming February 14 via Blabbermouth.net. This song was featured in an episode of the US version of Shameless.

"Alt Press" got an exclusive stream of the track "Blur" on February 16. Dez Fafara said about the song:

This track is simple [and] to the point: [It's about] when you walk in the bus or backstage to the usual vampiric atmosphere of people you don't know, drinking your beer, smoking your herb, monopolizing conversation as if it were their house and you wished they would all take a long walk off a short pier and disappear. The line "I don't know you but I fucking hate you" says it all. Get the fuck out and stay out, you groupie lush!

The whole album was made available for streaming via DevilDriver's official MySpace on February 18, four days before the album's release.

== Track listing ==
All lyrics are written by Dez Fafara; all music is composed by Mike Spreitzer, Jeff Kendrick, Jon Miller and John Boecklin, except where noted.

No.	Title	Lyrics	Music	Length
1.	"Dead to Rights"			4:53
2.	"Bring the Fight (To the Floor)"			3:33
3.	"Hardened"			5:46
4.	"Shitlist"			4:04
5.	"Talons Out (Teeth Sharpened)"			4:20
6.	"You Make Me Sick"			5:18
7.	"Coldblooded"			4:06
8.	"Blur"			4:58
9.	"The Blame Game"			4:00
10.	"Black Soul Choir" (16 Horsepower cover)	David Eugene Edwards	Edwards, Jean-Yves Tola, Kevin Soll	5:07
11.	"Crowns of Creation"			4:55
12.	"Lend Myself to the Night"			4:01
Total length:				55:01

Special edition bonus tracks
No.	Title	Length
13.	"Lost"	3:36
14.	"Fortune Favors the Brave"	5:30
15.	"Grinfucked" (live)	4:06
Total length:		68:08

Special edition bonus DVD
No.	Title	Length
1.	"You May Know Us from the Stage" (documentary)
2.	"Not all Who Wander Are Lost" (music video)
3.	"Clouds Over California" (music video)
4.	"Pray for Villains" (music video)
5.	"Fate Stepped In" (music video)
6.	"Another Night in London" (music video)

== CD credits ==
Writing, performance and production credits are adapted from the album liner notes.

=== Personnel ===
DevilDriver

- Dez Fafara – vocals
- Mike Spreitzer – lead guitar, bass
- Jeff Kendrick – rhythm guitar, bass
- Jon Miller – bass, additional guitars
- John Boecklin – drums, additional guitars, bass

Production

- Mark Lewis – production, engineering
- Charles Godfrey – assistant engineer, drum tech
- Juan Sebastian – additional assisting
- Daniel Castleman – vocal recording assistant
- Mike Spreitzer – music pre-production, additional recording
- Greg Weiss – vocal pre-production, additional recording
- Andy Sneap – mixing, mastering

Artwork and design

- Dez Fafara – art direction
- Ryan Clark – design
- Travis Shinn – photography

=== Studios ===
- Sonic Ranch, Tornillo, Texas – music recording
- Lambesis Studios, Del Mar, California – vocal recording
- Ocean242 Studios – music pre-production, additional recording
- Backstage Recording Studios, Derbyshire, UK – mixing, mastering

=== Venues ===
- Mr. Smalls, Midvale, Pennsylvania – live recording of "Grinfucked" on October 13, 2005

== DVD credits ==
You may Know Us from the Stage

- Daniel J. Burke – directing, editing, filming

"Not all Who Wander Are Lost"

- Nathan Cox – directing
- Lynn Kramer – production

"Clouds Over California"

- Nathan Cox – directing
- Brian Robinson – production

"Pray for Villains"

- Nathan Cox – directing
- Ken Franchi – production

"Fate Stepped In", "Another Night in London"

- Daniel J. Burke – directing, production

== Charts ==
Chart (2011)	Peak position
Australian Albums (ARIA)	9
Austrian Albums (Ö3 Austria)	40
Dutch Albums (Album Top 100)	100
French Albums (SNEP)	144
German Albums (Offizielle Top 100)	43
Scottish Albums (Official Charts)	59
Swiss Albums (Schweizer Hitparade)	59
UK Albums (Official Charts)	51
UK Rock & Metal Albums (Official Charts)	1
US Billboard 200	42
US Top Hard Rock Albums (Billboard)	2
US Top Rock Albums (Billboard)	10
US Indie Store Album Sales (Billboard)	15
