= Stanley Fafara =

American actor (1949–2003)

- Fafara as "Whitey" Whitney in Leave It to Beaver (1960)
- Born: Stanley Albert Fafara; September 20, 1950; San Francisco, California, U.S.
- Died: September 20, 2003 (aged 53); Portland, Oregon, U.S.
- Resting place: Redland Pioneer Cemetery
- Education: North Hollywood High School
- Occupation: Child actor
- Years active: 1955–1963
- Children: 1
- Relatives: Tiger Fafara (brother); Dez Fafara (nephew)

Stanley Albert Fafara (September 20, 1950 – September 20, 2003) was an American child actor, best known for his role as Hubert “Whitey" Whitney in the original Leave It to Beaver television series. His older brother, Tiger, played "Tooey W. Brown" in the series.

== Early life and career ==
Fafara was born in San Francisco, California, in September 1950. In 1957, his mother took him to an open casting call for a new family television series titled Leave It to Beaver. He had been working in commercials and television westerns since the age of 4. Fafara earned the part of Hubert "Whitey" Whitney, one of the Beaver Cleaver's best friends.

Fafara remained with Leave It to Beaver for six years. After the show's cancellation in 1963, he attended North Hollywood High School. He became friendly with the pop-rock band Paul Revere & the Raiders and reportedly moved in with the band for a time. He developed an alcohol habit and began to use drugs.

At his parents' instigation, Fafara went to live with his sister in Jamaica, where he tried his hand at painting; however, he continued to drink and use narcotics. He then returned to Los Angeles in 1972 where he was married briefly. He supported himself by dealing narcotics. In the 1980s he was arrested for breaking into pharmacies seven times. Fafara was sentenced to a year in jail after being arrested and convicted for an eighth burglary. After his release from jail, Fafara tried several jobs but eventually returned to dealing drugs.

Fafara later developed an addiction to heroin and was in and out of rehabilitation centers for many years. He became sober in 1995.

== Later years and death ==
Fafara spent the final eight years of his life clean and sober, initially living in a house for recovering addicts and alcoholics, then in a subsidized apartment in downtown Portland, Oregon. He lived on Social Security checks of $475 per month until his hospitalization in 2003. Due to his addiction to heroin, he contracted hepatitis C.

Fafara died on September 20, 2003, his 53rd birthday, in Portland, Oregon, of complications from hernia surgery he had undergone the previous month. Fafara is buried at Redland Pioneer Cemetery in Redland, Oregon.

== Filmography ==
Year	Title	Role	Notes
1955	Good Morning, Miss Dove	Fred Makepeace - Age 6	Uncredited
1957	Casey Jones	Carl Svenson	Episode: "Iron Men"
1957-1963	Leave It to Beaver	Hubert "Whitey" Whitney	57 episodes
1958	The Millionaire	Boy	Episode: "Millionaire Dan Howell"
1958	The Lost Missile	Boy on Evacuation School Bus	Uncredited
1958	Wagon Train	Johnny O'Malley	Episode: "The Luke O'Malley Story"
1959	Wanted: Dead or Alive	Young Boy	Episode: "Angels of Vengeance"; Uncredited
1959	Man Without a Gun		Episode: "Eye Witness"
1961	Window on Main Street	Peewee	Episode: "The Haunted House""
1962	The Wonderful World of the Brothers Grimm	Hansel	Uncredited
