= Spreitzer =

Spreitzer (from German spreizen "to spread (legs)") is a German surname belonging to the group of family names based on a personal characteristic, in this case from a nickname for someone who spread his/her legs when walking. Notable people with the name include:

- Edward Spreitzer (born 1961), American murderer
- Ken Spreitzer (born 1964), American software developer
- Mark Spreitzer (died 1986), American politician
- Mike Spreitzer (born 1981), American guitarist
