= Pray for Villains =

Studio album by DevilDriver
- Released: July 14, 2009
- Genre: Groove metal, melodic death metal
- Length: 56:15
- Label: Roadrunner
- Producer: Logan Mader

DevilDriver chronology
Head on to Heartache (2008)	Pray for Villains (2009)	Beast (2011)

Special edition cover

Professional ratings
Review scores
Source	Rating
About.com	4/5 stars
AllMusic	3.5/5 stars
Blabbermouth.net	9/10

Pray for Villains is the fourth studio album by American heavy metal band DevilDriver, released on July 14, 2009. It sold around 14,600 copies in its first week of release to debut at position No. 35 on the Billboard 200 chart.

On April 24, Roadrunner unveiled the cover artwork for both the regular and special editions of the album. It was also announced that the special edition would be a CD/DVD package with four bonus tracks, a behind-the-scenes DVD, and expanded artwork. On May 21, DevilDriver released the single "Pray for Villains" to the public. On June 17, the music video for "Pray for Villains" premiered on MetalSucks.net. Play.com also teamed up with Roadrunner to offer "Resurrection Blvd." for free download to people who preorder the special edition of the CD from the Play.com website.

== Notes ==
- "Self-Affliction" and "Dust Be the Destiny" were recorded during the album's sessions.
- "Damning the Heavens" is a bonus track from The Last Kind Words that was available on the US Hot Topic Only Edition of that album.
- "Wasted Years" is an Iron Maiden cover that originally appeared on the Kerrang! compilation Maiden Heaven: A Tribute to Iron Maiden.
- "Waiting for November" is a song about Fafara's mother-in-law's funeral.
- "Forgiveness Is a Six Gun" is believed to be about The Dark Tower series by author Stephen King.

== Track list ==
No.	Title	Length
1.	"Pray for Villains"	4:02
2.	"Pure Sincerity"	4:38
3.	"Fate Stepped In"	5:10
4.	"Back with a Vengeance"	3:40
5.	"I've Been Sober"	5:16
6.	"Resurrection Blvd."	3:58
7.	"Forgiveness Is a Six Gun"	4:33
8.	"Waiting for November"	5:06
9.	"It's in the Cards"	4:24
10.	"Another Night in London"	3:05
11.	"Bitter Pill"	4:24
12.	"Teach Me to Whisper"	4:01
13.	"I See Belief"	3:54
Total length:		56:15

Special edition bonus tracks
No.	Title	Length
14.	"Self-Affliction"	4:49
15.	"Dust Be the Destiny"	3:10
16.	"Damning the Heavens"	2:19
17.	"Wasted Years" (Iron Maiden cover)	5:00
Total length:		71:35

== Personnel ==
DevilDriver

- Dez Fafara – vocals
- Mike Spreitzer – lead guitar
- Jeff Kendrick – rhythm guitar
- Jon Miller – bass, additional guitars
- John Boecklin – drums, additional guitars

Production

- Logan Mader – producer, engineering, mixing, mastering
- Andy Sneap – additional guitars
- Ryan Clark – Design, Illustrated
- Greg Weiss – vocal producer

== Charts ==
Chart	Peak position
Australian Albums (ARIA)	35
Austrian Albums (Ö3 Austria)	61
Dutch Albums (Album Top 100)	92
French Albums (SNEP)	112
German Albums (Offizielle Top 100)	64
Scottish Albums (OCC)	75
Swiss Albums (Schweizer Hitparade)	74
UK Albums (OCC)	60
UK Rock & Metal Albums (OCC)	4
US Billboard 200	35
US Top Hard Rock Albums (Billboard)	4
US Top Rock Albums (Billboard)	14
US Indie Store Album Sales (Billboard)	11
