= Thrown into Exile (EP) =

EP by Thrown into Exile
- Released: April 2, 2013
- Recorded: Los Angeles, California
- Genre: Metalcore, thrash metal
- Length: 18:13
- Label: Self-released
- Producer: Mike Spreitzer

Thrown into Exile chronology
Thrown into Exile (2013)	Safe Inside (2016)

Singles from Thrown into Exile (EP)
- 1. "Not Alone" Released: March 4, 2013

Thrown into Exile EP is the first EP released by the American heavy metal band Thrown into Exile. It was released on April 2, 2013, and was produced by Mike Spreitzer.

== Reviews ==
Realmetalreviews.com gave the EP a score a 7/10, saying, "Thrown into Exile is definitely a band that will be around for years to come. With the pace they are keeping, they are on track to joining the ranks of their influences in no time. Thrown into Exile’s self titled EP is worth a listen if you are into more fresh metalcore sound."

== Release and promotion ==
On March 4, 2013, Thrown into Exile premiered a new song, “Not Alone. On April 16, they released their first music video for the song, directed by Fabio Jafet. The EP was released on April 2, 2013, via ITunes. While touring on the 2013 Rockstar Mayhem Festival, the band sold physical copies of the EP at their merchandise table.

== Track listing ==
No.	Title	Length
1.	"Not Alone"	3:35
2.	"Never Ending Battle"	5:26
3.	"Doppelganger"	5:12
4.	"Before I Go"	4:00
Total length:		18:13

== Personnel ==
Thrown into Exile

- Evan Seidlitz – vocals
- Erik Tisinger – bass
- Colin Reed – guitar
- Mario Rubio – lead guitar
- Chase Brickenden – drums

Production

- Mike Spreitzer – production
