= Mary Nash =

Mary Nash may also refer to:

- Mary Nash (actress) (1884–1976), American actress
- Mary Nash (author) (1925–2020), American writer
- Mary Nash (historian) (born 1947), Irish-Spanish academic
- Mary Louise Nash (1826-1896), American educator

== See also ==
- St Mary's Church, Nash, Newport, South Wales
