= Strike and Kill =

Studio album by DevilDriver
- Released: July 10, 2026
- Studios: Studio Nessa; HaunteDD; Audiohammer
- Genres: Groove metal, thrash metal
- Length: 50:53
- Label: Napalm
- Producer: Gabe Mangold

DevilDriver chronology
Dealing with Demons Vol. II (2023)	Strike and Kill (2026)

Strike and Kill is the eleventh studio album by the American heavy metal band DevilDriver. It was released on July 10, 2026, by Napalm Records. It is the first album to feature founding bassist Jon Miller since Beast (2011), as well as guitarists Alex Lee and Gabe Mangold and drummer Davier Pérez Ortega.

== Background ==
Prior to the recording of Strike and Kill, DevilDriver underwent several lineup changes. In October 2021, they parted ways with guitarist Neal Tiemann. In July 2022, the band saw the departure of bassist Diego Ibarra, the return of bassist Jon Miller, and the arrival of guitarist Alex Lee (formerly of Holy Grail). On December 8, 2022, the band announced the departure of drummer Austin D'Amond and the arrival of his replacement Davier Pérez. On September 3, 2024, Mike Spreitzer announced that he left the band after 20 years. On October 9, 2025, the band introduced Enterprise Earth guitarist, Gabe Mangold, as Spreitzer's replacement.

On April 16, 2026, DevilDriver announced their eleventh studio album Strike and Kill and its lead single "Dig Your Own Grave", the former set for release on July 10.

== Track listing ==
All lyrics are written by Dez Fafara; all music is composed by Davier Pérez Ortega, Gabe Mangold, Jon Miller, and Alex Lee.

Strike and Kill track listing
No.	Title	Length
1.	"Dig Your Own Grave"	4:29
2.	"Dead in the Water"	4:31
3.	"Sanctified in Scars"	4:03
4.	"Strike and Kill"	4:06
5.	"In the Moonlight"	4:32
6.	"Ride or Die"	2:54
7.	"Headed for the Fall"	3:52
8.	"Shut the Silence On"	3:36
9.	"Never Coming Home"	3:41
10.	"Summoning Shadows"	2:52
11.	"You're Just a Ghost"	4:41
12.	"Oath of Iron"	3:09
13.	"All Bets Are Off"	4:27
Total length:		50:53

== Personnel ==
Credits are adapted from the album's liner notes.

=== DevilDriver ===
- Dez Fafara – vocals
- Jon Miller – bass guitar
- Alex Lee – guitar
- Gabe Mangold – guitar, guitar recording, bass recording, vocal recording, production, mixing, mastering
- Davier Pérez Ortega – drums, co-production

=== Additional contributors ===
- Jason Suecof – drum recording
- Mike Low – additional drum engineering
- Niclas Mortensen – artwork
- Christopher Maxwell – layout design

== Charts ==
Chart performance for Strike and Kill
Chart (2026)	Peak position
Austrian Albums (Ö3 Austria)	51
French Physical Albums (SNEP)	109
French Rock & Metal Albums (SNEP)	32
German Albums (Offizielle Top 100)	93
Scottish Albums (Official Charts)	78
UK Albums Sales (Official Charts)	66
UK Independent Albums (Official Charts)	23
UK Rock & Metal Albums (Official Charts)	12
