= Head on to Heartache =

EP by DevilDriver
- Released: April 25, 2008
- Genre: Groove metal, melodic death metal
- Length: 17:45
- Label: Roadrunner

DevilDriver chronology
The Last Kind Words (2007)	Head on to Heartache (2008)	Pray for Villains (2009)

Head on to Heartache is an EP by American heavy metal band DevilDriver. It contains five songs, four of which were previously only available on special editions of their albums or on soundtracks of movies, and one song from 2007's The Last Kind Words.

== Track listing ==
No.	Title	Length
1.	"Damning the Heavens"	2:18
2.	"Unlucky 13"	4:06
3.	"Guilty as Sin"	3:06
4.	"Digging Up the Corpses"	3:52
5.	"Head on to Heartache (Let Them Rot)"	4:21
Total length:		17:45

== Sources ==
- https://mmfore.blogspot.com/2008/04/devildriver-head-on-to-heartache-ep.html
- http://www.roadrunnerrecords.co.uk/page/News?&news_page=&news_id=55131
