= Frances Gray Patton =

American novelist

Frances Gray Patton (March 19, 1906 – March 28, 2000) was an American short story writer and novelist. She is best known for her 1954 novel Good Morning Miss Dove.

== Biography ==
She was born in Raleigh, North Carolina to Robert Lily Gray, an editor for the Raleigh Times, and Mary McRae Gray, a writer who was the first woman to enroll at the University of North Carolina. From childhood, she expressed an interest in writing. She began to pursue a writing career at the University of North Carolina, where she held a playwriting fellowship. She was active in the theater and published her first play in the college magazine. Following her marriage to Dr. Lewis Patton, a professor at Duke University, Patton settled into her role as a faculty wife and raised a son and twin daughters. She began to focus her writing on short stories and in 1945, she published her first story, titled "A Piece of Bread." The story won a Kenyon Review Prize and was included in 1945 edition of the O. Henry Memorial Prize Stories.

During the next decade, Patton established a relationship with The New Yorker magazine, which would publish over two dozen of her stories. Her stories also appeared in such publications as Harper's, McCalls, The Saturday Review of Literature and Collier's Weekly. A collection of stories from the New Yorker comprised her first book, The Finer Things of Life, which was published in 1951. The book received praise from critics. Marge Lyon wrote in the Chicago Sunday Tribune that the stories were "whimsical in spots, faintly poignant in others, but lit with a glowing, humorous aura made up of bright observations, sparkles of wit, and diamond bright philosophy, shot with incandescent characterizations."

In 1954, Patton published Good Morning Miss Dove, which became a bestseller. The book, which tells the story of a beloved geography teacher in a small town, originated from an earlier story Patton wrote titled The Terrible Miss Dove. Charles Poore wrote in The New York Times that the novel was "ruthlessly sentimental" and "a cheerful mixture of Goodbye Mr. Chips and Mary Poppins, with touches of the rigorous way to salvation from Life With Father." The book was featured as a Book of the Month Club selection and was made into a successful 1955 film starring Jennifer Jones in the title role.

Patton published another short story collection in 1959 titled A Piece of Luck and a final collection in 1969 titled 28 Stories. In addition to writing, she taught creative writing courses at both Duke University and the University of North Carolina.

Patton's stories of Southern life and manners eventually earned her the nickname The Jane Austen of the South.

She died at 94 at Duke University Medical Center in Durham, North Carolina.

== Bibliography ==
- The Finer Things of Life; illustrated by Garrett Price (New York, Dodd, Mead, 1951).
- Good Morning, Miss Dove; illustrated by Garrett Price (New York, Dodd, Mead, 1954).
- A Piece of Luck [Stories] (New York, Dodd, Mead, 1955)
- Twenty-Eight Stories (New York, Dodd, Mead, 1969)
- Good morning, Miss Dove [Motion Picture] 1955, starring Jennifer Jones, Robert Stack, Kipp Hamilton, Mary Wickes, Jerry Paris, Robert Douglas, Chuck Connors, Peggy Knudsen, and Bill Elliot.
- Good Morning, Miss Dove : A Play in Three Acts, by William McCleery; based on the novel by Frances Gray Patton (1963).

In The New Yorker magazine

"As Man To Man," June 21, 1958. Fiction ABSTRACT - The Page family lived in a small North Carolina town. Mrs. Page decided to forgo their usual vacation at Swan's Neck, a resort on the Carolina coast, and take their two daughters on a tour of the northeastern seaboard. She wanted to leave Mr. Page & their son Alex alone...

"The Man Jones," March 26, 1955 Fiction ABSTRACT - Jim, a freshman at an Eastern college, took pains to behave in a more worldly manner than people in his home town, Apex, Georgia. He invited Barbara Davis of New York City, to the freshman dance, and made elaborate preparations for the evening. A letter arrived from his mother, enclosing...

"The Game," May 9, 1953 Fiction ABSTRACT - Lillian Duncan runs into a childhood girlfriend and takes her home to tea, hoping to impress her with her wealth, of which she is very proud. Maria did not marry so well. They talk about their happy childhood, remembering their game of imagining they were grown up with many unusual...

"Mothers and Daughters," April 5, 1952 Fiction ABSTRACT - The story of a mother's problem with her 17-year-old daughter who was going through a stage of resentment toward her mother. Having sacrificed quite a bit for the education and general welfare of her daughter, Emily could not understand why Laura was so rude and sarcastic and hateful...

"Remold It Nearer," March 10, 1951 Fiction ABSTRACT - Mrs. Potter suggested that her 15-year-old daughter ought to stay home on a certain Saturday evening as she had a cold. So Elinor was forced to give up her usual movie date which was a great blow to her. The family gathered in the living room peacefully. Prof...

"A Friend of the Court," February 17, 1951 Fiction ABSTRACT - The writer lives a quiet life in Durham, N.C. Her husband teaches at Duke University. She used to visit courts just for curiosity. This summer she went to court when a controversial case came up. It involved the circulation of the Stockholm Peace Petition, believed to be of Communist origin...

"The Representative Ham," May 20, 1950 Recollections ABSTRACT - Recollections of childhood thirty years ago in Stonesboro, N.C. The writer's mother was a member of the Young Matrons' Chapter of St. Luke's Woman's Auxiliary. The Chapter provided clothing for a missionary's family in China. To raise money the ladies had men's suppers, they tried juvenile theatricals, and published a...

A Piece of Luck," April 01, 1950 Fiction ABSTRACT - In Durham, N.C. a group of Negroes stood waiting for a bus to take them to the clinic at Duke Hospital. They were of different social positions. Among them was one of rather low position with a bandaged eye. He said that his eye had been removed, quoting the Biblical...

"Elinor and the Normal Life," November 12, 1949 Fiction ABSTRACT - Professor Potter, his wife and three children lived a contented life in a college town. The two boys, away at school seemed to follow in their father's footsteps. Daughter Elinor, at 14, was a beauty. She got in with the town's elite set and stopped seeing faculty children for a...

"A Nice Name," February 26, 1949 Fiction ABSTRACT - Josephine Archer, a serious matron in her forties, who lives in North Carolina, writes a letter to a newspaper suggesting reforms in the teaching of elementary Latin. She has been coaching pupils in this subject. A teacher in Virginia, Hannah Lee Marshall, chances to see this letter and a correspondence...

"Loving Hands at Home," January 29, 1949 Fiction ABSTRACT - Agatha Debnam was on a train returning to her home in Philadelphia after visiting her former home in a small Georgia town. She had been bored by the visit and looked forward to getting back to her two children, Chuck, aged 18, and Julia, two years younger, and her husband...

"First Principles," January 8, 1949 Fiction ABSTRACT - The Wades' Christmas had been very nice although there had been trouble beforehand. Henry Wade had lost his job, his brother was in financial difficulty and needed help. But daughter Laura, aged 14, had made it perfect by her obvious pleasure in everything. The two younger boys and the rest...

"The Face of Life," May 8, 1948 Fiction ABSTRACT - Mrs. Potter, a small town faculty wife, mother of three children, unexpectedly gets a check for $100 from her godmother. Professor Potter tells her she must spend it all on a dress for herself. She goes into town but somehow none of the dresses seem to ring a bell with...

"The Finer Things of Life," February 14, 1948 Fiction ABSTRACT - Mrs. Page looks forward to a dinner party with a great deal of anticipation as her husband had suggested that the family follow an austerity program for the past few weeks. As a result, she was really hungry for good food...

"And Hearts In Heaven," January 17, 1948 Fiction ABSTRACT - An Anglican priest comes to a Southern town and all the children dutifully go to services every afternoon during Lent. The author, a girl of 11 at the time, is greatly impressed with Father Tipton and longs to confess to him, except that she hasn't committed any sins. When her...

"The Falling Leaves," November 22, 1947 Fiction ABSTRACT - Harriet Blake, a suburban New Yorker, goes to live in her husband's home state in the South. She rebels against the lethargic ways of the people. One day she tells off a young woman who owns a shop in town, and later her colored mail. They both take her criticism...

"In a Philadelphia Park," September 6, 1947 Fiction ABSTRACT - A family: mother, father and 12-year-old twin girls are on their way home from the North to Durham, N.C. The twins are very superior about having lived in the North all summer and they are very urban. They are taken down a peg or two when a Philadelphia...

"Apricot Pie," April 5, 1947 Fiction ABSTRACT - Mrs. Page announces that she is going to make an apricot whipped-cream pie for supper. She never gets around to it, though. There are unexpected guests for dinner that evening and her son remarks to them that there will be a pie for dessert. Mrs. Page is forced to...

"The Educated Classes," March 1, 1947 Fiction ABSTRACT - Professor Potter wants his daughter Elinor, aged 13, to achieve a sort of mental discipline as he feels she is not serious enough. He is finally forced, reluctantly to give it up as a bad job, and let her go her way unhampered...

In Harper's magazine

"Grade 5B and the well-fed rat," May 1946 Fiction

== Sources ==
- Contemporary Authors
- The New York Times Obituary, April 2, 2000.
- The New Yorker On-Line Archive
- Harper's Magazine
