= DevilDriver (album) =

Studio album by DevilDriver
- Released: October 28, 2003
- Recorded: Rumbo Studios, Canoga Park, California and Castle Oaks Studios, Calabasas, California
- Genre: Groove metal
- Length: 41:13
- Label: Roadrunner
- Producers: Ross Hogarth, Dan Certa

DevilDriver chronology
DevilDriver (2003)	The Fury of Our Maker's Hand (2005)

Professional ratings
Review scores
Source	Rating
AllMusic	3/5 stars

DevilDriver is the debut studio album by American heavy metal band DevilDriver, the new band of former Coal Chamber singer Dez Fafara. In comparison to the other albums by DevilDriver, it is musically simpler, and Fafara sings in a different style.

The album's cover art features the Cross of Confusion, the band's logo.

Music videos were produced for "Nothing's Wrong?" and "I Could Care Less," the singles released off of the album, and found extensive airplay on programs such as Headbangers Ball and Uranium.

The song "Devil's Son" was featured in the tenth episode of the sixth season of Scrubs. "Swinging the Dead" is featured on the Freddy vs. Jason soundtrack.

== Track listing ==
No.	Title	Length
1.	"Nothing's Wrong?"	2:37
2.	"I Could Care Less"	3:37
3.	"Die (And Die Now)"	2:59
4.	"I Dreamed I Died"	3:29
5.	"Cry for Me Sky (Eulogy of the Scorned)"	4:01
6.	"The Mountain"	4:05
7.	"Knee Deep"	3:11
8.	"What Does It Take (To Be a Man)"	3:13
9.	"Swinging the Dead"	3:37
10.	"Revelation Machine"	3:30
11.	"Meet the Wretched"	4:07
12.	"Devil's Son"	2:49
Total length:		41:13

== Singles ==
- "Nothing's Wrong?"
- "I Could Care Less"
- "Swinging the Dead"

== Personnel ==
- Dez Fafara – vocals
- Evan Pitts – lead guitar
- Jeff Kendrick – rhythm guitar
- Jon Miller – bass
- John Boecklin – drums

=== Additional musicians ===
- Mike Doling – guitar on "Devil's Son"

=== Production ===
- Ross Hogarth – producer, engineering, mastering
- Dan Certa – producer, engineering
- Greg Reely – mixing
