= Outlaws 'til the End: Vol. 1 =

Outlaws 'til the End, Vol. 1

Studio album of cover songs by DevilDriver
- Released: July 6, 2018
- Genre: Groove metal, melodic death metal
- Length: 45:35
- Label: Napalm
- Producer: Steve Evetts

DevilDriver chronology
Trust No One (2016)	Outlaws 'til the End, Vol. 1 (2018)	Dealing with Demons I (2020)

Professional ratings
Review scores
Source	Rating
AllMusic	3.5/5 stars
Exclaim!	5/10

Outlaws 'til the End, Vol. 1 is the eighth studio album by American heavy metal band DevilDriver. It was released on July 6, 2018, via Napalm Records.

On February 28, 2017, DevilDriver announced via their Instagram account that they are to release an outlaw country covers record, with 13 tracks currently in production, with over 15 "high caliber" guests contributing. On July 15, frontman Dez Fafara announced that the number of guests had risen to 20–25, and that these included artists such as Lamb of God's Randy Blythe and Mark Morton, Lee Ving from FEAR, Glenn Danzig, Testament's Chuck Billy, and John 5. In the same interview, Fafara revealed that some of the artists that would be covered on the album are Willie Nelson, Johnny Cash, Waylon Jennings, and Johnny Paycheck, with Steve Evetts as album producer.

== Track listing ==
All music performed by DevilDriver, except where noted.

No.	Title	Writer(s)	Originally recorded by	Length
1.	"Country Heroes" (feat. Hank Williams III)	Hank Williams III	Hank Williams III	3:41
2.	"Whiskey River" (feat. Randy Blythe and Mark Morton)	Johnny Bush, Paul Stroud	Willie Nelson	3:40
3.	"Outlaw Man"	David Blue	Eagles	3:31
4.	"Ghost Riders in the Sky" (feat. John Carter Cash, Ana Cristina Cash and Randy Blythe)	Stan Jones	Johnny Cash	3:44
5.	"I'm the Only Hell (Mama Ever Raised)"	Bobby Bobby Borchers, Wayne Kemp, Mack Vickery	Johnny Paycheck	3:10
6.	"If Drinking Don't Kill Me (Her Memory Will)" (feat. Wednesday 13)	Harlan Sanders, Rick Beresford	George Jones	3:52
7.	"The Man Comes Around" (feat. Lee Ving)	Johnny Cash	Johnny Cash	3:49
8.	"A Thousand Miles from Nowhere"	Dwight Yoakam	Dwight Yoakam	4:26
9.	"Copperhead Road" (feat. Brock Lindow)	Steve Earle	Steve Earle	3:35
10.	"Dad's Gonna Kill Me" (feat. Burton C. Bell)	Richard Thompson	Richard Thompson	4:36
11.	"A Country Boy Can Survive"	Hank Williams Jr.	Hank Williams Jr.	3:41
12.	"The Ride" (feat. Lee Ving)	J. B. Detterline Jr., Gary Gentry	David Allan Coe	3:50
Total length:				45:35

== Personnel ==
DevilDriver

- Dez Fafara – vocals
- Mike Spreitzer – lead guitar, bass, programming
- Neal Tiemann – rhythm guitar, bass, backing vocals (8)
- Austin D'Amond – drums

Additional personnel

- Steve Evetts – production
- Hank Williams III – vocals (1)
- Randy Blythe – vocals (2, 4)
- Mark Morton – vocals (2)
- John Carter Cash – vocals (4)
- Ana Cristina – vocals (4)
- Wednesday 13 – vocals (6)
- Lee Ving – vocals (7, 12)
- Brock Lindow – vocals (9)
- Burton C. Bell – vocals (10)

== Charts ==
Chart (2018)	Peak position
Austrian Albums (Ö3 Austria)	45
Belgian Albums (Ultratop Flanders)	96
Belgian Albums (Ultratop Wallonia)	104
German Albums (Offizielle Top 100)	47
Scottish Albums (OCC)	92
Swiss Albums (Schweizer Hitparade)	49
US Billboard 200	172
US Top Hard Rock Albums (Billboard)	11
US Top Rock Albums (Billboard)	35
