= Mrs. Coverlet series =

Mrs. Coverlet
- First editions
- While Mrs. Coverlet Was Away; Mrs. Coverlet's Magicians; Mrs. Coverlet's Detectives
- Author: Mary Nash
- Illustrator: Garrett Price
- Country: United States
- Language: English
- Genre: Children's
- Publisher: Little, Brown and Company
- Published: 1958; 1960; 1965
- Media type: Print
- No. of books: 3

While Mrs. Coverlet Was Away (1958), Mrs. Coverlet's Magicians (1960), and Mrs. Coverlet's Detectives (1965) are a series of three children's books written by Mary Nash, with illustrations by Garrett Price. The books were published by Little, Brown and Company. The plot of one of them--Magicians—includes magical fantasy.

The principal characters are three school-aged children; from oldest to youngest they are Malcolm, Molly, and Theobold (nicknamed Toad). The housekeeper who looks after them is Mrs. Coverlet. The children's mother has died and their father must often be away on his job for months on end. "Toad" was inspired by Nash's youngest child Tom, who was called "Toad" as a child.

== Plot synopses ==
=== While Mrs. Coverlet Was Away ===
Mrs. Coverlet is suddenly called away by an emergency at a time when the children's father is in New Zealand, leaving the children to spend several summer weeks alone. Plot twists involve the children's decision to conceal the fact that there is no adult in the house, Malcolm's "complicated conscience," and the discovery that Theobold's pet cat is an extremely rare and valuable exotic breed.

=== Mrs. Coverlet's Magicians ===
A friend of the Persever family, Miss Eva Penalty, agrees to house-sit and look after the three children while their father is away managing a small tin mine and their beloved housekeeper, Mrs. Coverlet, is away participating in a baking contest. (Their mother is long-ago deceased.) The children are not happy about this, especially the youngest, Theobold "The Toad" Persever, because Miss Eva is a demanding, fastidious disciplinarian who interferes in their lives and feeds them too many vegetables. However, shortly after her arrival, Miss Eva's personality changes: she develops chronic fatigue, spends all her time in bed, and also becomes happy and indulgent. The two older children, Malcolm and Molly, learn that "the Toad" has been practicing magic on her using a recipe he obtained by answering an advertisement from the back cover of a comic book.

=== Mrs. Coverlet's Detectives ===
In Detectives, "the conscience-burdened Malcolm, practical Molly, and impish Theobold the Toad travel to New York to rescue their kidnapped pet cat.

== Critical reception ==
The New York Times praised While Mrs. Coverlet Was Away for rising above the admittedly preposterous premise with realistic characters and natural dialogue to produce a story about "recognizable children living out a wonderful fairy tale." The New York Herald Tribune called Away "light and humorous, credulity was stretched, but not too far, and the adventures and misadventures of a group of children running a household alone without being "rescued" by solicitous neighbors was hilarious and very popular with the young."

The Herald Tribune described Magicians as "Not quite as good because a magic device is used."

The New York Times described Detectives as the "only... completely successful" sequel among the recent children's books, an "exception to the rule of tired characters and bloodless plots."

== History ==
Magicians was one of the New York Times' One Hundred Outstanding Books for the Younger Readers in 1961.
