= Bucyrus, Kansas =

- CDP
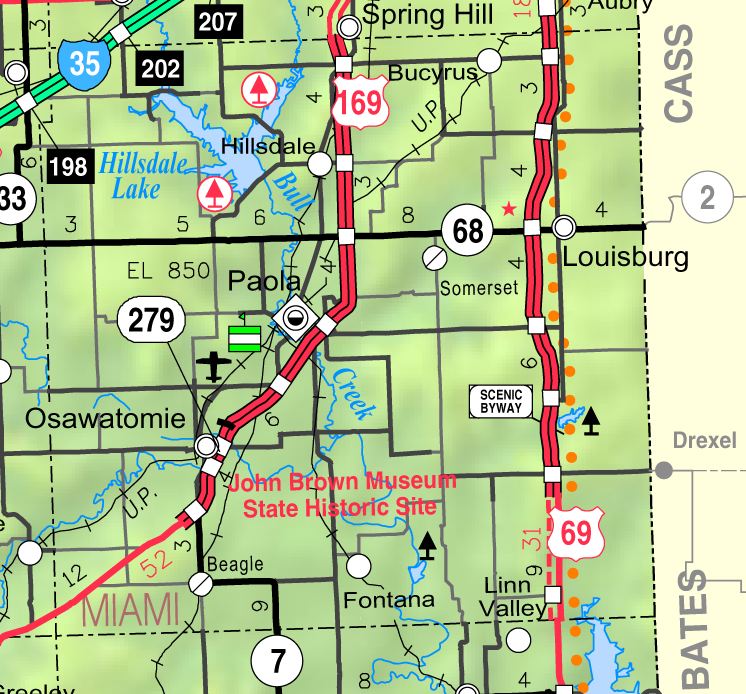
- KDOT map of Miami County (legend)

- Location within Kansas
- Coordinates: 38°43′25″N 94°42′50″W
- Country: United States
- State: Kansas
- County: Miami
- Elevation: 1,083 ft (330 m)

Population (2020)
  - Total: 171
- Time zone: UTC-6 (CST)
  - Summer (DST): UTC-5 (CDT)
- ZIP Code: 66013
- Area code: 913
- FIPS code: 20-09050
- GNIS ID: 2629154

Bucyrus is a census-designated place (CDP) in Miami County, Kansas, United States. As of the 2020 census, the population was 171. It is located 6 miles (9.7 km) east-southeast of Spring Hill, and named after Bucyrus, Ohio.

== History ==
In May 1887, the post office in Bucyrus was established. In 1921, a post office building was built at 112 4th Avenue.

In 1991, the post office building, with ZIP Code 66013, was sold. In 2024, the post office building faced closure, to be absorbed into the post office at Stillwell, Kansas.

As of June 2026, Earl's Coffee Company, currently provides post office services at 112 4th Avenue.

== Demographics ==
Historical population
Census	Pop.	Note	%±
2020	171		—
U.S. Decennial Census

It is part of the Kansas City metropolitan area.

The 2020 United States census counted 171 people, 64 households, and 49 families in Bucyrus. The population density was 85.5 per square mile (33.0/km^{2}). There were 67 housing units at an average density of 33.5 per square mile (12.9/km^{2}). The racial makeup was 85.96% (147) white or European American (85.38% non-Hispanic white), 0.58% (1) black or African-American, 1.17% (2) Native American or Alaska Native, 0.0% (0) Asian, 0.0% (0) Pacific Islander or Native Hawaiian, 3.51% (6) from other races, and 8.77% (15) from two or more races. Hispanic or Latino of any race was 8.19% (14) of the population.

Of the 64 households, 26.6% had children under the age of 18; 67.2% were married couples living together; 23.4% had a female householder with no spouse or partner present. 21.9% of households consisted of individuals and 12.5% had someone living alone who was 65 years of age or older. The average household size was 2.2 and the average family size was 2.2. The percent of those with a bachelor's degree or higher was estimated to be 17.5% of the population.

30.4% of the population was under the age of 18, 4.1% from 18 to 24, 17.0% from 25 to 44, 26.9% from 45 to 64, and 21.6% who were 65 years of age or older. The median age was 39.5 years. For every 100 females, there were 131.1 males. For every 100 females ages 18 and older, there were 190.2 males.

The 2016–2020 5-year American Community Survey estimates show that the median household income was $75,817 (with a margin of error of +/- $9,070) and the median family income was $75,817 (+/- $9,070). Males had a median income of $51,641 (+/- $21,717) versus $31,250 (+/- $10,518) for females. The median income for those above 16 years old was $43,918 (+/- $19,839). Approximately, 0.0% of families and 0.0% of the population were below the poverty line, including 0.0% of those under the age of 18 and 0.0% of those ages 65 or over.

== Notable people ==
- Garrett Price, cartoonist and illustrator for The New Yorker, born in Bucyrus
