= The Fury of Our Maker's Hand =

Studio album by DevilDriver
- Released: June 28, 2005
- Recorded: 2005
- Studio: Sonic Ranch Studios in Tornillo, Texas
- Genres: Groove metal, melodic death metal
- Length: 51:12
- Label: Roadrunner
- Producer: Colin Richardson

DevilDriver chronology
DevilDriver (2003)	The Fury of Our Maker's Hand (2005)	The Last Kind Words (2007)

Alternative cover
- Re-issued album cover artwork

Professional ratings
Review scores
Source	Rating
AllMusic	4/5 stars
Blabbermouth.net	6/10 stars
Kerrang!	4/5 stars

The Fury of Our Maker's Hand is the second studio album by American heavy metal band DevilDriver, released on June 28, 2005. It's the first DevilDriver album to feature guitarist Mike Spreitzer. The album entered the Billboard charts at number 117, with sales of 10,402. A special edition of the album was released on October 31, 2006. It contained six bonus tracks and an additional DVD with the band's four music videos.

A music video was produced for the song "Hold Back the Day", which found airplay on MTV2's Headbangers Ball. It featured stylistic elements, primarily background visuals such as a female mannequin head, highly reminiscent of Black Sabbath's video for "Paranoid".

The song "Driving Down the Darkness" was featured in the tenth episode of the sixth season of Scrubs.

== Notes ==
- "Unlucky 13" and "Guilty as Sin" were tracks recorded during the sessions for The Fury of Our Maker's Hand.
- "Digging Up the Corpses" is an outtake from their self-titled DevilDriver album. The song had only been previously released on the Resident Evil: Apocalypse movie soundtrack.
- The three live tracks (mixed by Andy Sneap) were recorded on tour in support of The Fury of Our Maker's Hand.

== Track listing ==
No.	Title	Length
1.	"End of the Line"	5:03
2.	"Driving Down the Darkness"	3:53
3.	"Grinfucked"	3:31
4.	"Hold Back the Day"	4:14
5.	"Sin & Sacrifice"	5:05
6.	"Ripped Apart"	4:11
7.	"Pale Horse Apocalypse"	4:13
8.	"Just Run"	4:15
9.	"Impending Disaster"	4:09
10.	"Bear Witness Unto"	4:05
11.	"Before the Hangman's Noose"	3:52
12.	"The Fury of Our Maker's Hand"	4:51
Total length:		51:12

Special edition bonus tracks
No.	Title	Length
13.	"Unlucky 13"	4:06
14.	"Guilty as Sin"	3:06
15.	"Digging Up the Corpses"	3:53
16.	"I Could Care Less" (live)	3:43
17.	"Hold Back the Day" (live)	4:25
18.	"Ripped Apart" (live)	4:29
Total length:		74:49

Special edition bonus DVD
No.	Title	Length
1.	"End of the Line" (music video)
2.	"Hold Back the Day" (music video)
3.	"I Could Care Less" (music video)
4.	"Nothing's Wrong" (music video)

== Credits ==
- Dez Fafara – vocals
- Michael Spreitzer – lead guitar
- Jeffrey Kendrick – rhythm guitar
- Jon Miller – bass
- John Boecklin – drums

Production

- Colin Richardson – production, engineering, mixing
- Justin Leeach – assistant engineering
- Bobby Torres – assistant engineering
- Will Bartle – assistant mixing
- Ted Jensen – mastering
- Paul Brown – photography, layout
- Monte Conner – A&R

== Charts ==
Chart	Peak position
French Albums (SNEP)	153
US Billboard 200	117
US Heatseekers Albums (Billboard)	1
