= Winter Kills (album) =

Studio album by DevilDriver
- Released: August 27, 2013
- Recorded: Audiohammer Studios, Sanford, Florida
- Genre: Groove metal, melodic death metal
- Length: 49:19
- Label: Napalm Records
- Producer: Mark Lewis & DevilDriver

DevilDriver chronology
Beast (2011)	Winter Kills (2013)	Trust No One (2016)

Singles from Winter Kills
- 1. "Ruthless" Released: June 26, 2013

Winter Kills is the sixth studio album by American heavy metal band DevilDriver. It was released on August 27, 2013, via Napalm Records. It is the only DevilDriver album to feature new bassist Chris Towning who was a touring member from 2012 until joining permanently in February 2013. Recording of instrumental parts took place at Audiohammer Studios in Sanford, Florida and the album was produced by Mark Lewis. The album is available in several different configurations which can include bonus tracks or a live DVD. It would be DevilDriver's last album with founding members John Boecklin and Jeff Kendrick before both of them left the band in October 2014.

"Sail" is a cover of a song by indie band Awolnation. Frontman Dez Fafara was turned on to the original by his then-teenage sons.

== Reception ==
Professional ratings
Aggregate scores
Source	Rating
Metacritic	70/100
Review scores
Source	Rating
AllMusic	3.5/5 stars
Exclaim!	7/10

Winter Kills received a Metacritic score of 70 based on six reviews, indicating generally favorable reviews.

The album sold around 11,000 copies in the United States in its first week of release to debut at position No. 32 on Billboard 200 chart. It has sold 50,000 copies in the United States as of April 2016.

== Track listing ==
All tracks are written by DevilDriver, except "Sail", written by Aaron Bruno.

No.	Title	Length
1.	"Oath of the Abyss"	5:36
2.	"Ruthless"	4:09
3.	"Desperate Times"	4:08
4.	"Winter Kills"	4:54
5.	"The Appetite"	4:46
6.	"Gutted"	3:28
7.	"Curses and Epitaphs"	5:04
8.	"Caring's Overkill"	4:33
9.	"Haunting Refrain"	4:59
10.	"Tripping Over Tombstones"	3:38
11.	"Sail" (Awolnation cover)	4:04
Total length:		49:19

Bonus tracks
No.	Title	Length
12.	"Shudder"	4:03
13.	"Back Down to the Grave"	4:44
Total length:		58:08

== Charts ==
Chart (2013)	Peak position
Australian Albums (ARIA)	14
Austrian Albums (Ö3 Austria)	26
Belgian Albums (Ultratop Flanders)	84
Belgian Albums (Ultratop Wallonia)	118
Dutch Albums (Album Top 100)	87
Finnish Albums (Suomen virallinen lista)	24
German Albums (Offizielle Top 100)	24
Scottish Albums (OCC)	70
Swiss Albums (Schweizer Hitparade)	45
UK Albums (OCC)	71
UK Independent Albums (OCC)	15
UK Rock & Metal Albums (OCC)	5
US Billboard 200	32
US Top Hard Rock Albums (Billboard)	3
US Independent Albums (Billboard)	6
US Top Rock Albums (Billboard)	10
US Indie Store Album Sales (Billboard)	8

== Personnel ==
DevilDriver

- Dez Fafara – vocals
- Mike Spreitzer – lead guitar
- Jeff Kendrick – rhythm guitar
- Chris Towning – bass
- John Boecklin – drums

Technical personnel

- Mark Lewis – production
- Dean Karr – cover art photography
- Ryan Clark – cover art layout
