= Trust No One (DevilDriver album) =

Studio album by DevilDriver
- Released: May 13, 2016
- Recorded: Audio Vault Studio, Los Angeles
- Genre: Groove metal, melodic death metal
- Length: 41:20
- Label: Napalm
- Producer: Mark Lewis & DevilDriver

DevilDriver chronology
Winter Kills (2013)	Trust No One (2016)	Outlaws 'til the End: Vol. 1 (2018)

Professional ratings
Review scores
Source	Rating
AllMusic	3.5/5 stars
HeavyBlogIsHeavy	3/5 stars

Trust No One is the seventh studio album by American heavy metal band DevilDriver. It was released on May 13, 2016, via Napalm Records. It is the first DevilDriver album since rhythm guitarist Jeff Kendrick and drummer John Boecklin departed and were replaced by Neal Tiemann and Austin D'Amond, respectively. During the writing process, DevilDriver recruited a new bassist, Diego "Ashes" Ibarra.

== Track listing ==
All lyrics by Dez Fafara and all music by Mike Spreitzer, Neal Tiemann and Austin D'Amond.

No.	Title	Length
1.	"Testimony of Truth"	4:43
2.	"Bad Deeds"	3:46
3.	"My Night Sky"	4:28
4.	"This Deception"	3:47
5.	"Above It All"	3:22
6.	"Daybreak"	4:22
7.	"Trust No One"	4:38
8.	"Feeling Ungodly"	3:41
9.	"Retribution"	4:01
10.	"For What It's Worth"	4:31
Total length:		41:19

Bonus tracks
No.	Title	Length
11.	"House Divided"	4:56
12.	"Evil on Swift Wings"	4:16
Total length:		50:31

== Personnel ==
- Dez Fafara: vocals
- Mike Spreitzer: lead guitar, bass, programming
- Neal Tiemann: rhythm guitar, bass
- Austin D'Amond: drums
- Mark Lewis: producer

== Charts ==
Chart (2016)	Peak position
Australian Albums (ARIA)	21
Austrian Albums (Ö3 Austria)	42
Belgian Albums (Ultratop Flanders)	87
Belgian Albums (Ultratop Wallonia)	97
Canadian Albums (Billboard)	52
German Albums (Offizielle Top 100)	44
Swiss Albums (Schweizer Hitparade)	43
UK Albums (OCC)	99
US Billboard 200	43
US Independent Albums (Billboard)	4
US Top Hard Rock Albums (Billboard)	3
US Top Rock Albums (Billboard)	4
US Indie Store Album Sales (Billboard)	10
