= Mary Nash (author) =

American author (1924–2020)

Mary Nash (July 7, 1924 – September 16, 2020) was a 20th-century American writer. She wrote the Mrs. Coverlet trilogy of children’s books, as well as a book about actress Susannah Maria Cibber.

== Family life and education ==
Nash grew up in Wilmington, Delaware, attended Radcliffe College and earned a master's degree in creative writing from the University of Washington. She married a physician, Harry Nash, and they reared three children in Cambridge, Massachusetts. The children were named Norman, Holly and Tom; Tom, who was called "Toad" as a child, inspired the character in the Coverlet books.

== Career ==
Nash began writing children's books after reading a number of disappointing ones to her own children.

Nash taught creative writing at the Radcliffe Institute.

Nash was "celebrated" for her children's trilogy While Mrs. Coverlet Was Away (1958), Mrs. Coverlet's Magicians (1960), and Mrs. Coverlet's Detectives.

Nash's book The Provoked Wife: the life and times of Susannah Cibber (1977) was an account of the life of the 18th-century actress Susannah Maria Cibber.
