= DevilDriver =

American heavy metal band

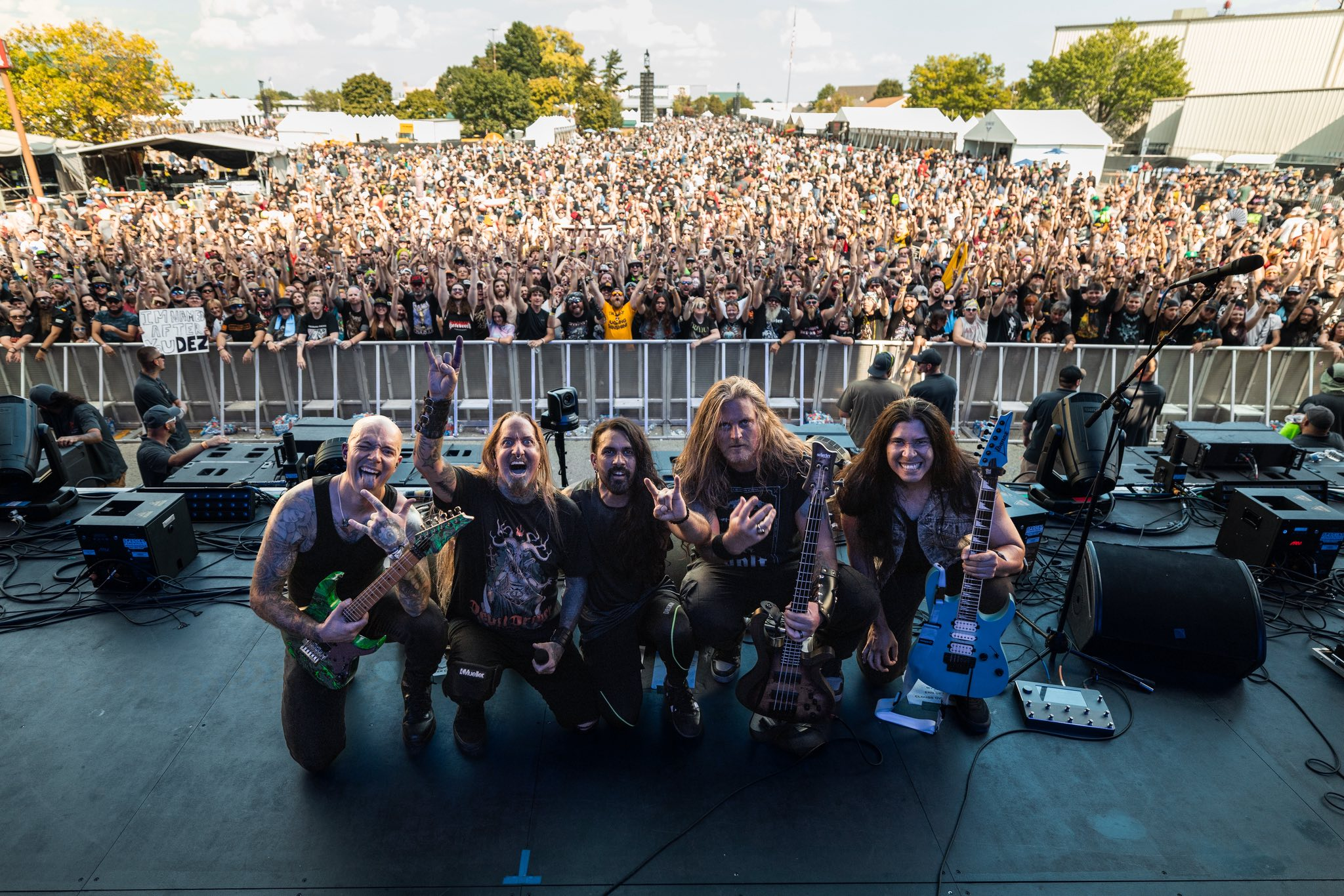
- DevilDriver at Louder Than Life in 2025. From left to right: Gabe Mangold, Dez Fafara, Davier Pérez Ortega, Jon Miller, Alex Lee

Background information
- Also known as: Deathride (2002–2003)
- Origin: Santa Barbara, California, U.S.
- Genres: Groove metal; melodic death metal
- Years active: 2002–present
- Labels: Napalm; Roadrunner; Echo
- Spinoff of: Coal Chamber
- Members: Dez Fafara; Jon Miller; Alex Lee; Davier Pérez Ortega; Gabe Mangold
- Past members: Evan Pitts; John Boecklin; Jeff Kendrick; Chris Towning; Neal Tiemann; Diego Ibarra; Austin D'Amond; Mike Spreitzer
- Website: devildriver.com

DevilDriver is an American heavy metal band from Santa Barbara, California, formed in 2002, consisting of vocalist Dez Fafara, bassist Jon Miller, lead guitarist Alex Lee, drummer Davier Pérez Ortega and rhythm guitarist Gabe Mangold. The band was originally named Deathride, but due to copyright issues and the name being used by several bands, they changed it to DevilDriver.

== History ==
=== Deathride era, self-titled debut (2002–2004) ===
Fafara hosted several barbecues after moving from Orange County to Santa Barbara, and would jam with musicians he met, which led to the formation of the band. "I met Evan. We struck up a friendship and started jamming," said Fafara. Guitarist Evan Pitts met Fafara in a restaurant and gave him his phone number for a jam session, while John Boecklin, who originally played second guitar and then drums, met Fafara at a bar.

The band was known as Deathride, but changed their name to DevilDriver because Fafara felt there were too many bands with that name, including a band in Norfolk, Virginia, and a bicycle racing team. Moreover, the band's label, Roadrunner Records, were unable to secure copyright. The members compiled a list of two hundred names to go for a more original approach. Fafara's wife had a book by Italian witchcraft author Raven Grimassi on Stregheria, and came across the term "devil driver". The term refers to bells Italian witches used to ward off evil forces. Fafara thought it appropriate because it sounded "evil" and "suits his life". The band's logo is the Cross of Confusion, which has existed for thousands of years and refers to "question religion, question authority, question everything around you". Fafara was brought up to "question everything" and was exposed to Italian witchcraft through his grandparents.

DevilDriver's debut record was going to be called Thirteen, and then Straight to Hell. Fafara claims it was changed "for so many reasons that I can't even go into." The band's self-titled debut, DevilDriver, was released on October 28, 2003, under Roadrunner Records, and entered the Top Heatseekers chart at number 17. Guitarist Pitts wrote roughly 90% of the music, according to Mike Spreitzer, who replaced Pitts after his departure from the band.

=== The Fury of Our Maker's Hand (2005–2006) ===
The band returned to the studio in 2005 to record their follow-up to DevilDriver. The album was produced at Sonic Ranch Studios, a 1,400-acre (5.7 km^{2}) pecan ranch, 40 miles (64 km) away from El Paso, Texas. The band members wanted to be isolated so they could focus on the music, as friends, family, managers and girlfriends were constantly interrupting them. Roughly 30 songs were written, which the band narrowed down to 15. The 15 songs were played for producer Colin Richardson, who wanted to begin tracking immediately.

The name of the album was thought of by Fafara, who believed that The Fury of Our Maker's Hand refers to the "storm" his life has been the past 10 years, "You have your maker's hand and I have my maker's hand and we both living in our fury, the fury of our maker's hand. It explains my life". The album was released on June 28, 2005, and debuted on the Billboard 200 chart at number 117, with sales of 10,402 in its first week. The album debuted at number 1 on the Top Heatseekers chart. Johnny Loftus of Allmusic described the album as "a severe turn away from the falter of their first album" and said that the band made their "true debut the second time around". Dom Lawson of Kerrang! gave the album a positive review describing the album as a "fresh and exhilarating approach to modern metal".

The band toured extensively in support of the album, which included shows in the United States, Europe, and Australia in support of bands such as In Flames, Fear Factory, and Machine Head. The band played for the first time as a headliner in the Burning Daylight Tour. On October 31, 2006, The Fury of Our Maker's Hand was re-released to include three new studio tracks, including "Digging up the Corpses" which was featured on the soundtrack to Resident Evil: Apocalypse. The release also contained three live recordings of previously released, a DVD of all of the band's music videos, new cover art, and inside liner notes.

=== The Last Kind Words (2007–2008) ===
DevilDriver Live at Wolverhampton Little Civic in 2007

The band reunited at Sonic Ranch Studios while they recorded their third studio effort, The Last Kind Words, was released in July 31, 2007. The album's first single "Not All Who Wander Are Lost" was directed by Nathan Cox for free. Cox's career began when he created Coal Chamber's music video "Loco", so he re-paid a favor to Fafara and the band. Cox now directs music videos for bands such as Linkin Park and Korn. The first song to be previewed was "Horn of Betrayal" which debuted on Sirius Satellite's Hard Attack channel on May 16, 2007. The Last Kind Words entered the German charts at number 92, and peaked at number 48 on the Billboard 200, with over 14,000 copies sold.

DevilDriver promoted the album at the 2007 Download Festival at Donington Park alongside headliners Linkin Park, Iron Maiden, and My Chemical Romance. A Guinness world record was attempted by the band for the "largest circle pit" at the festival. Guinness responded to the query and denied the request stating they receive over 60,000 requests a year and there is no way to physically define where a circle pit starts and ends. They considered the proposal fully in the context of the subject area and stated that "our decision is final in this matter". The band also appeared at 2007's Ozzfest. Fafara had been planning to take his first six weeks off in 11 years, but Sharon Osbourne, who had managed Fafara's previous band Coal Chamber, persuaded him to appear. At a concert in Detroit, Michigan, a recording was made with the intention of releasing a live DVD in 2008 although this has yet to be released.

DevilDriver's songs "Devil's Son" and "Driving Down the Darkness" were featured in the TV show Scrubs, and in 2008 they covered the Iron Maiden song "Wasted Years" for the Kerrang! compilation Maiden Heaven: A Tribute to Iron Maiden. The song "Clouds Over California" became available as a download for the music video game Rock Band.

=== Pray for Villains (2009–2010) ===
Their fourth album Pray for Villains was released on July 14, 2009, debuting at No. 35 on the Billboard 200, with estimated sales of around 14,600, improving on their previous effort, which debuted at No. 48.

On February 21, 2009, the band performed in Australia at the Soundwave Festival with bands such as Lamb of God and In Flames. After finishing their Melbourne show, they announced that their new album would be released July 14, 2009. The band also toured in the Midwest states in mid-May 2009 with bands such as Slipknot, 3 Inches of Blood and All That Remains before headlining the 'Thrash and Burn' Tour with Emmure, Despised Icon, MyChildren MyBride, Oceano, Kittie, and Thy Will Be Done amongst others. They also completed a European Tour with several other bands such as Behemoth and Suicide Silence.

In January and February 2010, DevilDriver embarked on their headlining 'Bound By The Road' Tour with Suffocation, Goatwhore, and Thy Will Be Done.

In March 2010, DevilDriver participated in 2010's Getaway Rock festival, which was held in Gävle, Sweden, and began on July 8 and ended on the 10th. The band will also be included in an extensive UK tour in November 2010 with 36 Crazyfists.

=== Beast (2011) ===
DevilDriver's fifth album Beast was recorded at Sonic Ranch studios in Tornillo, Texas with producer Mark Lewis, and released February 22, 2011. John Boecklin confirmed that the new album was mixed by Andy Sneap at his Backstage studio in Derbyshire, England in July. DevilDriver went on a tour in Australia with bands such as Iron Maiden, Slayer, All That Remains and Nonpoint for the Soundwave Festival in February and March 2011.

On March 30, it was announced that bassist Jon Miller and DevilDriver would part ways, in the interest of Miller's continuing recovery. Miller departed on his own and released a resignation letter to the press.

DevilDriver opened for Danzig along with 2Cents in 2011 supporting Danzig's 2010 release Deth Red Sabaoth, and toured North America with Chthonic and Skeletonwitch supporting Arch Enemy.

=== Winter Kills, lineup changes and hiatus (2012–2014) ===
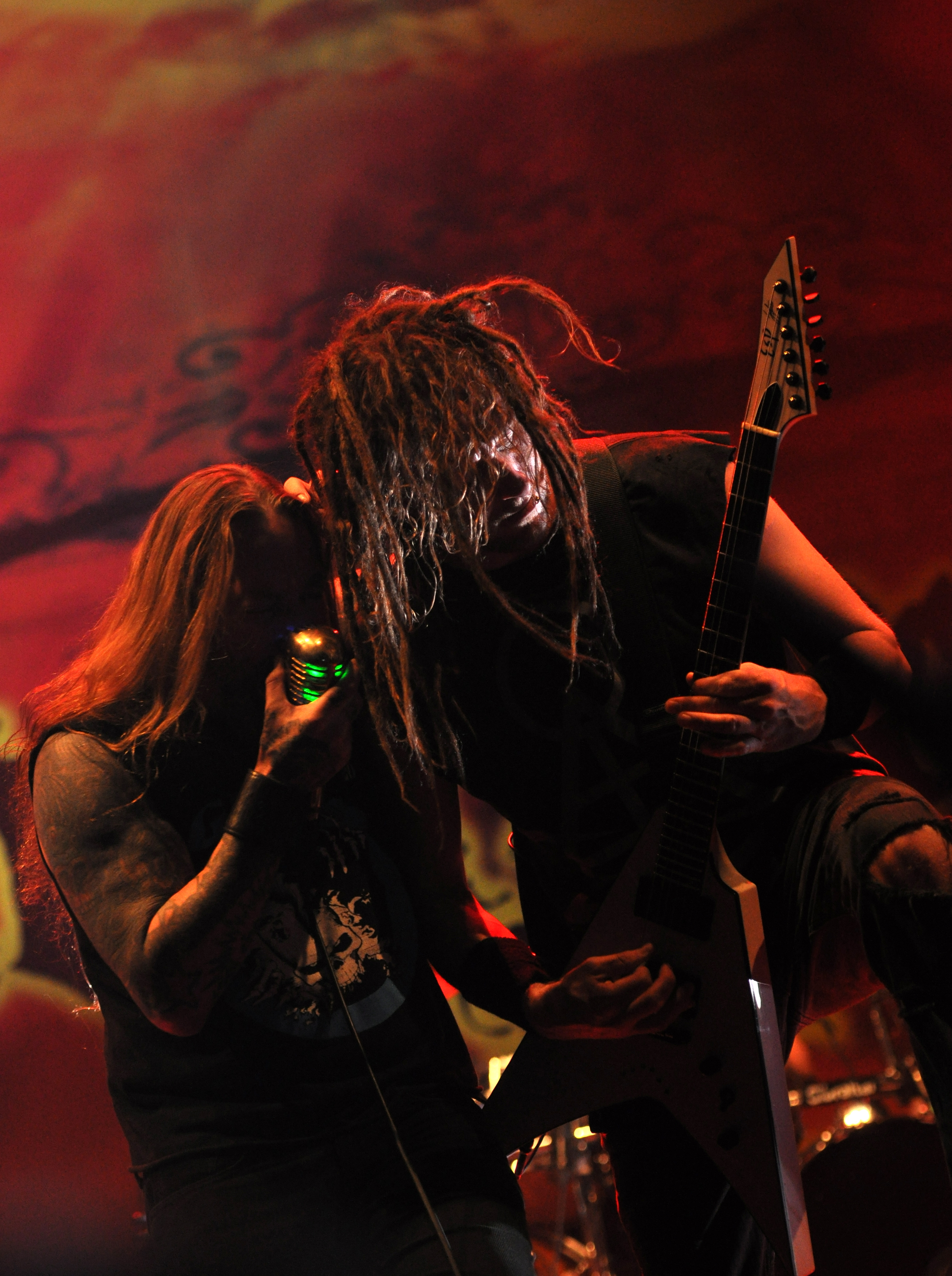
Mike Spreitzer and Dez Fafara with DevilDriver at Paaspop 2014

DevilDriver headlined the 2012 Metal Alliance Festival Tour in the spring.

On February 9, 2012, guitarist Jeff Kendrick announced via his Twitter account that himself, John Boecklin (drums) and Mike Spreitzer (guitars) had "begun to compose and demo songs for DevilDriver's 6th album. We are extremely excited!!!". In March 2012, during an interview with Nick Azinas from Peek from the Pit, vocalist Dez Fafara announced that the band was looking for a new record label. This announcement officially ended the ten-year relationship between Devildriver and Roadrunner Records. On July 8 it was announced that DevilDriver has signed with Napalm Records for the upcoming sixth album. On February 18, 2013, Dez announced on his Twitter account that Chris Towning who has been filling in on bass for the past year has been made the band's official bassist. In a March 2013 interview with Get Your Rock Out guitarist Jeff Kendrick announced that an album title was "very close", adding that the record was currently being mixed with only a couple of pieces of vocal recording to be done before the album is mastered. On May 28, 2013, DevilDriver released the cover artwork and release date for the new album, Winter Kills. The album was released on August 27, 2013, by Napalm Records, their first album release since leaving Roadrunner.

We delivered our signature California Groove sound alongside a Raw and Biting guitar tone, mixed it with massive hooks, added in thunderous drums to rethink, and reshape another different sounding unique piece of Rock-N-Roll! Cutting our own path is something to be proud of. Devildriver has always and will forever be about thinking outside the box and delivering on something different from record to record, we cannot be assimilated into any scene or even genre of Metal and we will continue to do things our own way with a massive middle finger in the air to the status quo!

— Dez Fafara

On October 28, 2014, Dez Fafara announced that drummer John Boecklin and guitarist Jeff Kendrick left the band, the former going on to form the band, Bad Wolves. He also announced that the band will be on hiatus until 2016, when the new album will be released, to focus on his reunion with Coal Chamber.

=== Trust No One (2015–2016) ===
On January 7, 2015, it was announced that past member Chimaira drummer Austin D'Amond had joined the band as the new drummer. On March 19, 2015, Neal Tiemann was announced as the replacement for Jeff Kendrick on guitars. Tiemann started his career with Midwest Kings and has spent time playing with Caroline's Spine, Burn Halo and Uncle Kracker among others.

On May 2, 2015, Dez Fafara said that there were 12 new songs written for the next DevilDriver album. They were anticipating recording them in October–November 2015 and Spring-Summer 2016 for a release date later in 2016. Dez Fafara continued that DevilDriver had to get back into their normal recording cycle; he did not want DevilDriver sitting around too long although they did need to take a break after releasing Winter Kills.

On November 19, 2015, DevilDriver revealed the title for the upcoming album, Trust No One, alongside the album art. The album is set to be released on May 13, 2016. In March, DevilDriver announced that former Static-X guitarist, Diego "Ashes" Ibarra, would replace the recently departed Chris Towning on bass on a permanent basis for upcoming shows in the US, European and UK dates in support of the new album.

On March 18, 2016, DevilDriver released their first single from upcoming album, Trust No One, titled 'Daybreak', through their official YouTube channel.

=== Outlaws 'til the End (2017) ===
On February 28, 2017, DevilDriver announced via their Instagram account that they are to release an outlaw country covers record, with 13 tracks currently in production, with over 15 "high caliber" guests contributing. On July 15, Fafara announced that the number of guests had risen to 20-25, and that these included artists such as Lamb of God's Randy Blythe and Mark Morton, Lee Ving from FEAR, Glenn Danzig, Testament's Chuck Billy, and John 5. In the same interview, Fafara revealed that some of the artists that would be covered on the album are Willie Nelson, Johnny Cash, Waylon Jennings, and Johnny Paycheck, with Steve Evetts as album producer.

=== Dealing with Demons and lineup changes (2018–2025) ===
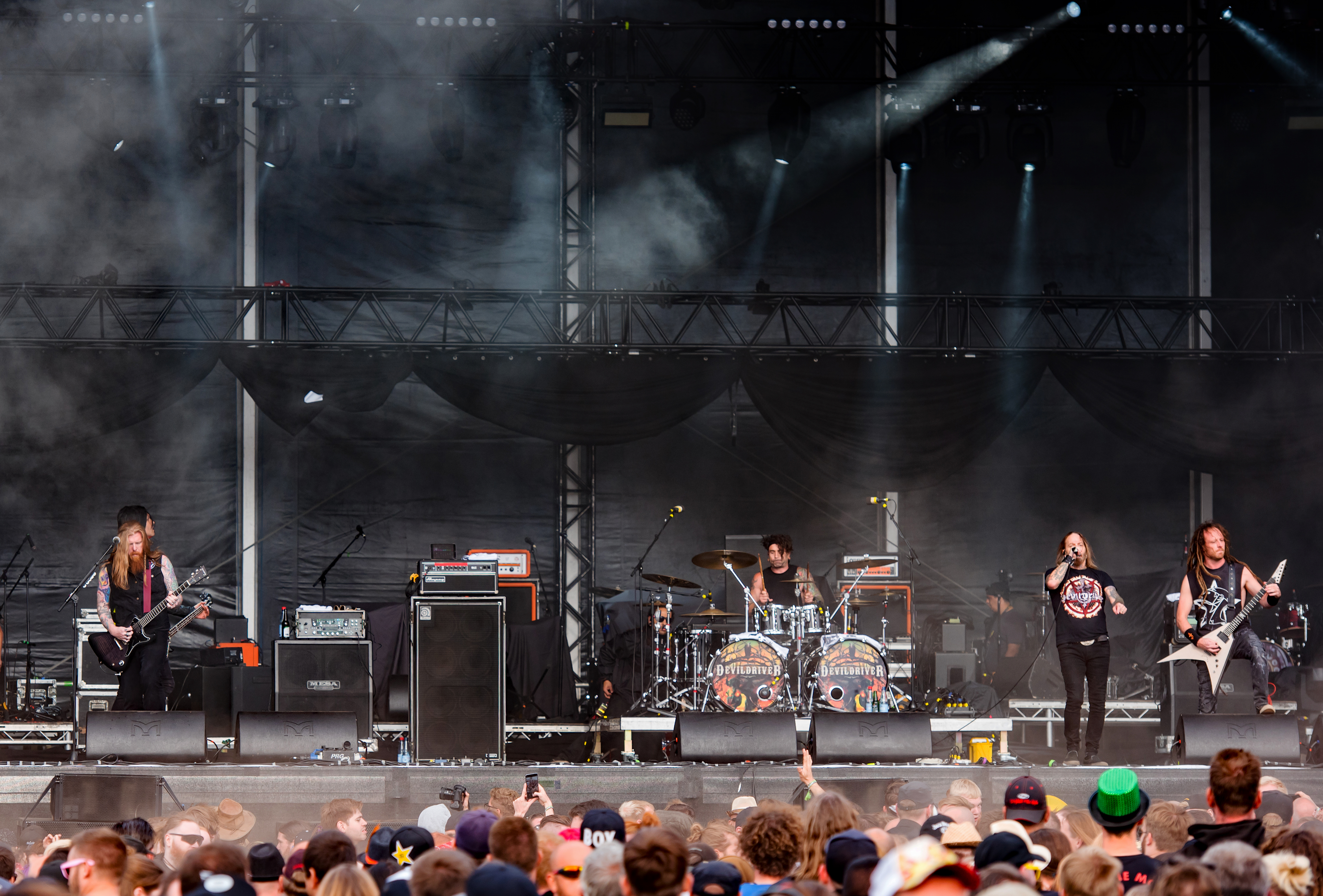
DevilDriver performing in 2018 at Reload Festival

On April 9, 2018, it was reported that DevilDriver had 48 songs written for a new concept double album, with Fafara stating "this will be the record of our career". The band are planning on narrowing down the songs to "20 or 22" and enter the studio in June 2018. In January 2019, Fafara posted on Instagram that he had begun tracking vocals for the new albums and that a summer 2019 release should be expected. In July 2019, Fafara announced that the first part of the double album should be expected in early 2020 with the second part in 2021. He also stated that a second volume of Outlaw Country covers in 2023 before a final studio album in 2024/2025. He went on to say that he would then take a prolonged break from music for 4/5 years. In later 2019, DevilDriver canceled a run of shows in support of Static-X and an appearance on the inaugural MegaCruise (a festival on a cruise ship organized by Megadeth), this was due to Fafara's wife being diagnosed, treated and subsequently cured for skin cancer. On May 21, 2020, the first part of a double album was announced, Dealing with Demons I, scheduled for release October 9, 2020. The first single, "Keep Away from Me", was released on the same day as the announcement. In October 2021, DevilDriver parted ways with guitarist Neal Tiemann.

On July 16, 2022, it was announced bassist Diego Ibarra had departed the band. Three days later, the band announced the return of bassist Jon Miller, and the arrival of guitarist Alex Lee (formerly of Holy Grail). On December 8, 2022, the band announced the departure of drummer Austin D'Amond and the arrival of his replacement Davier Pérez Ortega.

On March 7, 2023, the band announced that Dealing with Demons Vol. II would be released on May 12.

On September 3, 2024, Mike Spreitzer announced that he left the band after 20 years. On October 9, 2025, the band introduced Gabe Mangold as Spreitzer's replacement.

=== Strike and Kill (2026–present) ===
On April 16, 2026, DevilDriver announced their eleventh studio album Strike and Kill and its lead single "Dig Your Own Grave"; the former was released on July 10.

The band are confirmed to be making an appearance at Welcome to Rockville, which will take place in Daytona Beach, Florida in May 2026.

== Musical style and influences ==
DevilDriver's music has been widely described as groove metal and melodic death metal. All of the members have stated they are influenced by several types of music. Miller's songwriting influences include Acid Bath, Morbid Angel, Mercyful Fate and Blind Guardian; Miller states that other bands that influenced his songwriting are the same bands that he has now had the opportunity to tour with, including Slayer, In Flames, Opeth, Fear Factory and Metallica. Fafara's influences include Johnny Cash, and Motörhead, stating he likes people with "low voices". Members of DevilDriver can be seen on Machine Head's Elegies DVD citing Machine Head as an influence. Boecklin's main inspiration into becoming a percussionist came from his enjoyment of Metallica, Primus and Ministry.

== Band members ==
=== Current ===
- Dez Fafara – vocals (2002–present)
- Jon Miller – bass (2002–2011, 2022–present)
- Alex Lee – lead guitar (2024–present); rhythm guitar (2022–2025)
- Davier Pérez Ortega – drums (2022–present)
- Gabe Mangold – rhythm guitar (2025–present)

=== Former ===
- Evan Pitts – lead guitar (2002–2004)
- John Boecklin – rhythm guitar (2002); drums (2002–2014)
- Jeff Kendrick – rhythm guitar (2002–2014)
- Mike Spreitzer – lead guitar (2004–2024)
- Aaron "Bubble" Patrick – bass (2011–2012; session/touring)
- Chris Towning – bass (2012–2016)
- Neal Tiemann – rhythm guitar (2015–2021)
- Austin D'Amond – drums (2015–2022)
- Diego "Ashes" Ibarra – bass (2016–2022)

== Discography ==
Studio albums

Year	Album details	Peak charts positions								
Year	Album details	US	US Heat.	AUS	AUT	FRA	GER	NLD	SWI	UK
2003	DevilDriver: Released: October 28, 2003; Label: Roadrunner	—	17	—	—	—	—	—	—	—
2005	The Fury of Our Maker's Hand: Released: June 28, 2005; Label: Roadrunner	117	1	—	—	153	—	—	—	—
2007	The Last Kind Words: Released: July 31, 2007; Label: Roadrunner	48	—	46	—	147	92	—	—	94
2009	Pray for Villains: Released: July 14, 2009; Label: Roadrunner	35	—	35	61	112	64	92	74	60
2011	Beast: Released: February 22, 2011; Label: Roadrunner	42	—	9	40	144	43	100	59	51
2013	Winter Kills: Released: August 27, 2013; Label: Napalm	32	—	14	26	—	24	87	45	71
2016	Trust No One: Released: May 13, 2016; Label: Napalm	43	—	21	42	—	44	—	43	99
2018	Outlaws 'til the End: Vol. 1: Released: July 6, 2018; Label: Napalm	172	—	—	45	—	47	—	49	—
2020	Dealing with Demons I: Released: October 2, 2020; Label: Napalm	—	—	—	64	—	61	—	81	—
2023	Dealing with Demons Vol. II: Released: May 12, 2023; Label: Napalm	—	—	—	—	—	—	—	—	—
2026	Strike and Kill: Released: July 10, 2026; Label: Napalm	—	—	—	51	—	93	—	—	—
"—" denotes a release that did not chart.

EPs

Year	Album details
2008	Head on to Heartache: Released: April 25, 2008; Label: Roadrunner

== Music videos ==
Year	Title	Director
2003	"I Could Care Less"	P.R. Brown
2003	"Nothing's Wrong?"	Joe Lynch
2005	"Hold Back the Day"	Joe Lynch
2006	"End of the Line"	Unknown
2007	"Not All Who Wander Are Lost"	Nathan Cox
2007	"Clouds Over California"	Nathan Cox
2009	"Pray for Villains"	Nathan Cox
2009	"Fate Stepped In"	Daniel J. Burke
2009	"Another Night in London"	Daniel J. Burke
2011	"Dead to Rights"	Daniel J. Burke
2013	"The Appetite"	Daniel J. Burke
2016	"Daybreak"	Shan Dan Horan
2016	"My Night Sky"	Shan Dan Horan
2016	"Trust No One"	Unknown
2018	"Ghost Riders in the Sky"	Unknown
2020	"Iona"	Vicente Cordero
2020	"Nest of Vipers"	Vicente Cordero
2020	"Wishing"	Vicente Cordero
2023	"Through The Depths"	Vicente Cordero
2023	"If Blood Is Life"	Unknown
2023	"This Relationship, Broken"	Unknown
