= The Last Kind Words =

Studio album by DevilDriver
- Released: July 31, 2007
- Recorded: November 16, 2006 – December 2006
- Studio: Sonic Ranch outside El Paso, Texas
- Genres: Groove metal, melodic death metal
- Length: 45:39
- Label: Roadrunner
- Producer: Jason Suecof

DevilDriver chronology
The Fury of Our Maker's Hand (2005)	The Last Kind Words (2007)	Head on to Heartache (2008)

Singles from The Last Kind Words
- 1. "Head on to Heartache (Let Them Rot)" Released: April 25, 2008

Professional ratings
Review scores
Source	Rating
About.com	4/5 stars
AllMusic	3.5/5 stars
Blabbermouth.net	9/10 stars

The Last Kind Words is the third studio album by American heavy metal band DevilDriver. The album was released in July 31, 2007.

The album debuted at number 48 on the U.S. Billboard 200, selling about 14,000 copies in its first week. "Clouds Over California" is available for playable download in the video game Rock Band.

== Track listing ==
No.	Title	Length
1.	"Not All Who Wander Are Lost"	3:32
2.	"Clouds Over California"	4:09
3.	"Bound by the Moon"	4:01
4.	"Horn of Betrayal"	4:24
5.	"These Fighting Words"	3:58
6.	"Head on to Heartache (Let Them Rot)"	4:22
7.	"Burning Sermon"	3:38
8.	"Monsters of the Deep"	4:03
9.	"Tirades of Truth"	5:11
10.	"When Summoned"	3:04
11.	"The Axe Shall Fall"	5:15
Total length:		45:39

Hot Topic bonus track
No.	Title	Length
12.	"Damning the Heavens"	2:18

== Personnel ==
DevilDriver

- Dez Fafara – vocals
- Mike Spreitzer – lead guitar
- Jeff Kendrick – rhythm guitar
- Jon Miller – bass
- John Boecklin – drums

Additional musicians

- Simon Fafara – vocals on "Tirades of Truth"

Production

- Jason Suecof – production, engineering
- Andy Sneap – mixing
- Mark Lewis – engineering

== Charts ==
Chart	Peak position
Australian Albums (ARIA)	46
French Albums (SNEP)	147
German Albums (Offizielle Top 100)	92
UK Albums (Official Charts)	94
UK Rock & Metal Albums (Official Charts)	8
US Billboard 200	48
US Top Hard Rock Albums (Billboard)	6
US Top Rock Albums (Billboard)	13
US Indie Store Album Sales (Billboard)	12
