= Good Morning, Miss Dove =

1955 film by Henry Koster

- Theatrical release poster
- Directed by: Henry Koster
- Screenplay by: Eleanore Griffin
- Based on: Good Morning, Miss Dove; 1954 novel by Frances Gray Patton
- Produced by: Samuel G. Engel
- Starring: Jennifer Jones; Robert Stack; Kipp Hamilton; Robert Douglas; Peggy Knudsen; Chuck Connors
- Cinematography: Leon Shamroy
- Edited by: William H. Reynolds
- Music by: Leigh Harline
- Color process: Color by DeLuxe
- Production company: 20th Century Fox
- Distributed by: 20th Century Fox
- Release date: November 23, 1955 (New York City)
- Running time: 107 minutes
- Country: United States
- Language: English
- Budget: $1,470,000

Good Morning, Miss Dove is a 1955 American CinemaScope drama film that tells the sentimental story of a beloved schoolteacher who reflects on her life and former students when she is hospitalized. It stars Jennifer Jones, Robert Stack, Kipp Hamilton, Robert Douglas, Peggy Knudsen, Marshall Thompson, Chuck Connors, and Mary Wickes.

The screenplay was adapted by Eleanore Griffin and based on the bestselling novel Good Morning, Miss Dove by Frances Gray Patton, which was based on three short stories she had written for The Ladies Home Journal: "The Terrible Miss Dove", '"Miss Dove and Judgment Day" and "Miss Dove and the Maternal Instinct". The film was directed by Henry Koster.

A 60-minute TV adaptation, with Phyllis Kirk in the main role, was seen in 1956 as part of the weekly anthology The 20th Century Fox Hour.

== Plot ==
Miss Dove (Jennifer Jones), commonly referred to as "the terrible Miss Dove," is a prim and proper geography teacher who governs her classroom with strict disciplinary rules, dependable habits and a common-sense approach to life's everyday challenges. To the residents and former pupils of Liberty Hill, she is regarded as the epitome of gentility and wisdom.

On a typical day, her habits never varying, Miss Dove oils her creaking gate and walks to the schoolhouse, briefly stopping to address her neighbors along the way. As the school bell rings, she stands at the entrance to her classroom as each of her pupils gets in line and greets her with "Good morning, Miss Dove." During this morning's session, she reprimands David Burnham (Biff Elliot) for swearing and tells him that he must remain after class and write "Nothing is achieved by swearing" 20 times in his notebook. During David's detention, Miss Dove suddenly feels a sharp pain at the base of her spine and tells David to run and tell his father that she is ill.

Miss Dove puts her head down on her desk and begins to think about the day when her father died and changed her life forever. She had met a promising new beau when her father suddenly died. After his death, she learns that her father, who had been president of the local bank, "borrowed" a large sum of money and their home is heavily mortgaged. Miss Dove is determined to make the matter right and promises Mr. Porter (Robert Douglas), the new bank president, that she will repay the debt by becoming a teacher. Mr. Pendleton (Marshall Thompson) visits Miss Dove and proposes marriage, but she turns him down upon receiving a call from Mr. Porter telling her that he has obtained a position for her at Cedar Grove School.

Miss Dove returns to the present when Dr. Baker (Robert Stack) and Rev. Burnham arrive and form a seat with their arms to carry her from school through the streets of Liberty Hill to the hospital. She is admitted to her room by a former student, Billie Jean (Peggy Knudsen), who chatters incessantly along the way. Billie Jean, who left Liberty Hill and had a child out of wedlock, has returned to her hometown and is smitten with a police officer named Bill Holloway (Chuck Connors). Miss Dove fondly recalls Bill and tells Billie Jean that he was one of her best pupils. In a flashback, she remembers how he arrived to her classroom, a poor, unkempt boy being raised by his alcoholic grandmother. Over the years, Miss Dove gave Bill odd jobs and even bought him a suit for his grammar school (eighth grade) graduation. As Bill entered the Marines, he wrote to Miss Dove often, and when he returned to Liberty Hill, she was the first person he came to for advice about his future career.

The news of Miss Dove's hospitalization spreads, and she is soon visited by her former students. Another flashback shows Maurice Levine (Jerry Paris) when he came to Cedar Grove as a Jewish boy from Poland unable to speak English and was teased and chased by his classmates. Miss Dove taught him to speak English and arranged for her class to visit the Levine home for a special meal. He became a successful playwright, and Miss Dove traveled to New York to see his first play. Another visitor is amiable, friendly Frederick Makepeace (Eddie Firestone), who is doing time on a prison road-gang for petty theft, and had been in class with Maurice. Miss Dove has another flashback where she recalls how distraught Dr. Baker's wife Virginia ("Jincey") had been after she found out her original fiancé changed his mind about getting married. Jincey turned to Miss Dove for direction. Miss Dove told her she should go to her room at her sister's house and fall on her knees thanking God for His protection, and then look for something to do with her life to help her fellow man. Jincey then considered going into the nursing field. In still another story, there was a "run" on the local bank as frantic depositors waited in line to withdraw their savings. Miss Dove instead deliberately stalled for time as she very leisurely deposited her paycheck just as the teller windows closed at 3:00, angering other depositors. The next morning, the crisis passed as the bank received money from Federal authorities.

Dr. Baker informs Miss Dove that she must have surgery to remove a growth on the base of her spine. Mr. Porter offers to get Miss Dove a skilled surgeon in a distant city and have the civic club pay her full expenses, but she insists that Dr. Baker perform the surgery.

On the day of the surgery, classes are dismissed, and the townspeople wait outside the hospital for news of Miss Dove's operation. As she awakes, Dr. Baker tells her that the operation has been a success and that she will be all right. As the bells begin to ring throughout the town, Billie Jean tells Miss Dove that school was dismissed. In typical fashion, Miss Dove tells Dr. Baker that he must inform Mr. Spivey (Richard Deacon), the principal of the school, that the children must be returned to their classes in order to study for the state proficiency exams the following Monday. She goes into detail about what each class needs to review.

== Cast ==
- Jennifer Jones as Miss Dove
- Robert Stack as Dr. Tommy Baker
- Kipp Hamilton as Virginia "Jincey" Baker
- Robert Douglas as John Porter
- Peggy Knudsen as Billie Jean Green
- Chuck Connors as Bill Holloway
- Marshall Thompson as Wilfred Banning Pendleton III
- Biff Elliot as Rev. Alex Burnham
- Jerry Paris as Maurice "Rab" Levine
- Mary Wickes as Miss Lorraine Ellwood
- Richard Deacon as Mr. Spivey (uncredited)
- Eddie Firestone as Fred Makepeace (uncredited)

== Response ==
The film opened to generally good reviews and good box office in November 1955. A review in The New York Times commented: "Since it is unashamedly sentimental without being excessively maudlin about its heroine, 'Good Morning, Miss Dove' deserves credit for being honest and entertaining."

== See also ==
- List of American films of 1955
