= Mike Spreitzer =

American guitarist (born 1981)

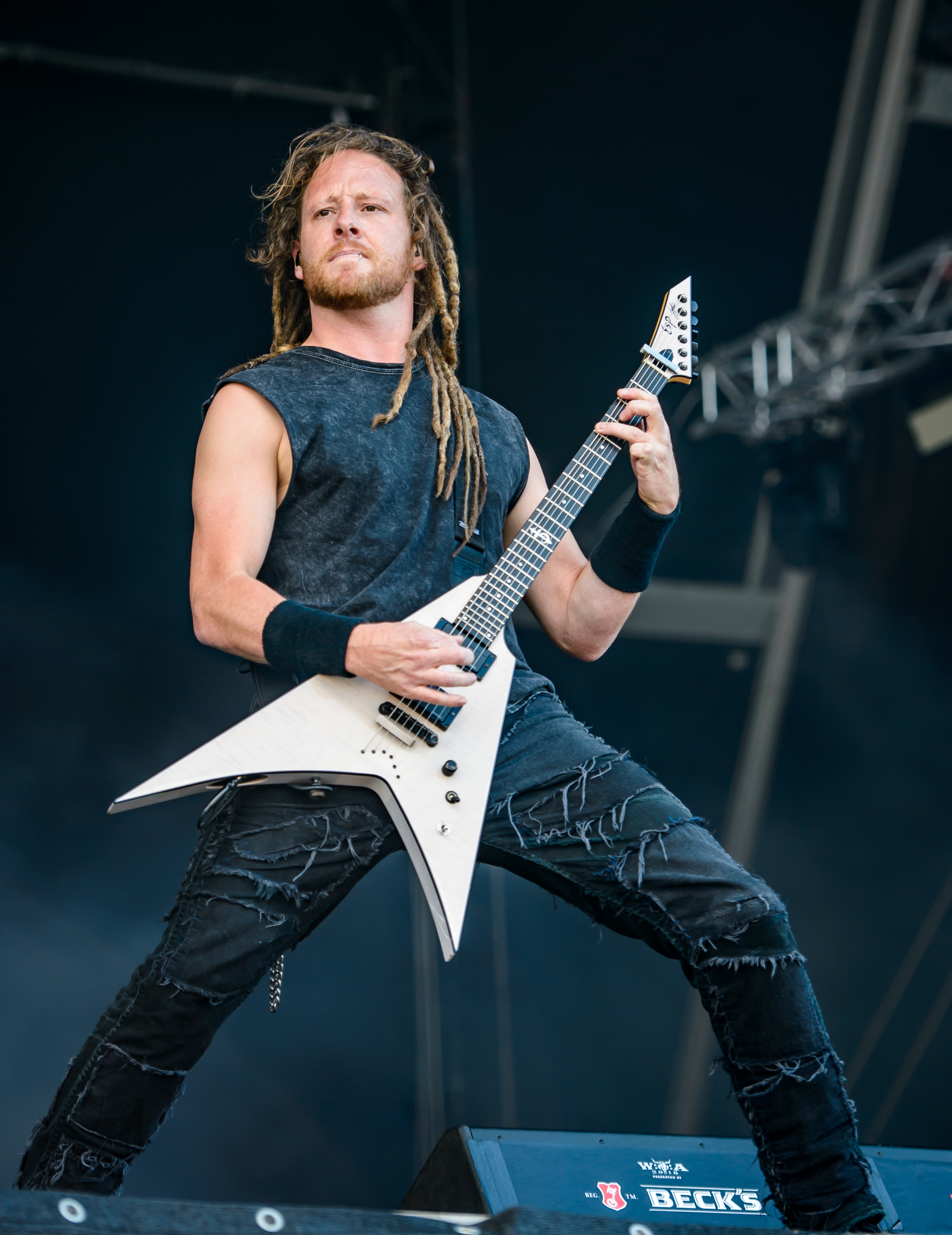
- Spreitzer performing with DevilDriver in 2016

Background information
- Born: Michael Colin Spreitzer; February 10, 1981 (age 44); Torrance, California, U.S.
- Origin: Santa Barbara, California, U.S.
- Genres: Groove metal; melodic death metal; alternative metal; industrial
- Occupations: Musician, record producer, engineer
- Instrument: Guitar
- Formerly of: DevilDriver, No Love Lost
- Website: veronaonvenus.com

Michael Colin Spreitzer (born February 10, 1981) is an American musician and record producer, best known as the former lead guitarist of heavy metal band DevilDriver. He was the second-longest lasting member following the departures of all original members except vocalist Dez Fafara. He replaced original lead guitarist Evan Pitts in 2004. Spreitzer performed on DevilDriver's albums The Fury of Our Maker's Hand (2005), The Last Kind Words (2007), Pray for Villains (2009), Beast (2011) Winter Kills (2013) Trust No One (2016), Outlaws 'til the End: Vol. 1 (2018), Dealing with Demons Vol. 1 (2020), and Dealing with Demons Vol. 2 (2023)

== Career ==
In 2001, Spreitzer joined a local heavy metal band from Santa Barbara called Grolby alongside future DevilDriver band mates John Boecklin, Jon Miller, and Jeff Kendrick. Unfortunately, Grolby broke up eight months after Spreitzer joined. At this point, Spreitzer went on to form an industrial metal band called No Love Lost with friends Cliff Ross and Dan Bellinger. Although an album's worth of material was written and recorded, nothing was ever released.

In April 2004, DevilDriver was about to embark on their first European tour opening for Swedish heavy metal band In Flames. Two days before the tour began, DevilDriver's guitarist Evan Pitts was forced to withdraw from the tour for personal reasons, leaving the band without a second guitar player. At the time, Jon Miller and Jeff Kendrick lived with Spreitzer when not touring with DevilDriver. When Spreitzer heard that Pitts would not be going on the European tour he immediately offered to fill in temporarily for the duration of the tour. Shortly after DevilDriver returned to Santa Barbara, Pitts had decided not to continue with the band and Spreitzer became a permanent member.

After Spreitzer joined DevilDriver in 2004, he would tour with the band and contribute on the albums The Fury of Our Maker's Hand, The Last Kind Words, Pray for Villains, Beast, Winter Kills, Trust No One, Outlaws 'til the End: Vol. 1 and Dealing with Demons Vol. 1 and 2.

On November 20, 2023, Michael announced his new musical project Verona on Venus. The debut album Popular Delusions was released on January 19, 2024.

On September 3, 2024, Mike Spreitzer announced that he left DevilDriver after 20 years.

== Equipment ==
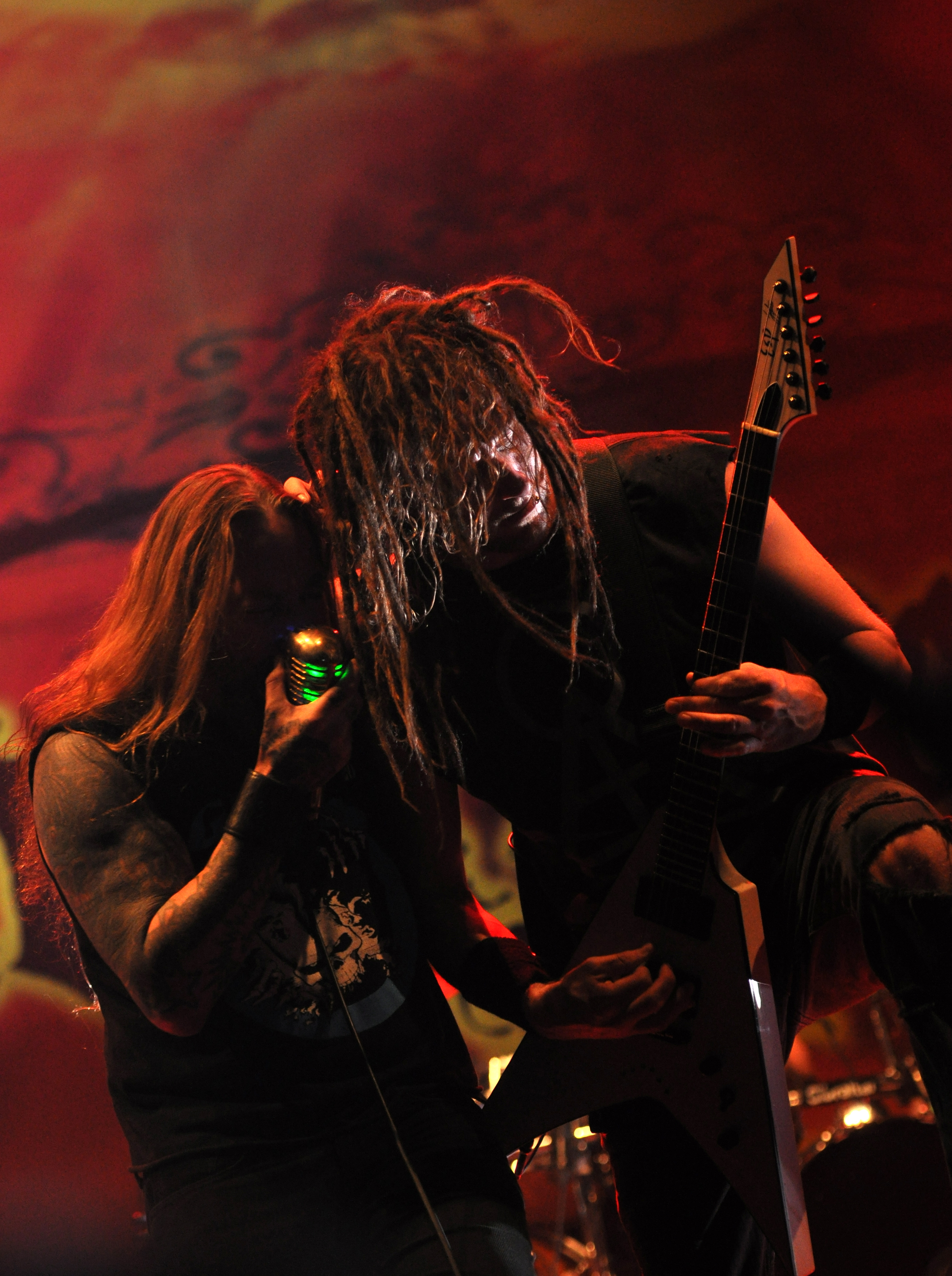
Spreitzer and Dez Fafara with DevilDriver

- ESP Guitars
- Fractal Axe FX
- Fishman Pickups
- EMG Pickups
- SIT Strings
- REVV Speaker Cabinets
- Mesa Boogie Speaker Cabinets
- Driftwood Amplifiers
- Maxon Effect Pedals
- Get'm Get'm Guitar Straps
- Pig Hog Cables

== Discography ==
=== DevilDriver ===
- The Fury of Our Maker's Hand (2005)
- The Last Kind Words (2007)
- Pray for Villains (2009)
- Beast (2011)
- Winter Kills (2013)
- Trust No One (2016)
- Outlaws 'til the End: Vol. 1 (2018)
- Dealing with Demons Vol. 1 (2020)
- Dealing with Demons Vol. 2 (2023)

=== Verona on Venus ===
- Popular Delusions (2024)

=== Other work ===
==== Studio albums ====
Year	Artist	Title	Label	Role	Notes
2012	Esoterica	Nothing Left to Loose	Esoterica & Trak Records	Guest guitarist	Track 8
2012	Give Zombies the Vote	Dominions	—N/a	Producer, mixer, mastering	
2012	Final Curse	Way of the Accursed	—N/a	Mixer	
2013	Collapse	Arms and the Covenant	Transcend Music	Mixer	
2013	Vendetta of the Fallen	Malice	—N/a	Mastering	
2018	Heaven Below	Good Morning Apocalypse	Broken Halo	Engineer	
2018	DevilDriver	Outlaws 'til the End: Vol. 1	Napalm	Engineer	
2018	Tortured Saint	Message to the Throne	—N/a	Mixer, mastering	
2019	PIG	Stripped & Whipped	Armalyte Industries	Guest guitarist	Track 4
2019	Wednesday 13	Necrophaze	Nuclear Blast	Producer, mixer, engineer	

==== EPs ====
Year	Artist	Title	Label	Role	Notes
2012	Synthetic Breed	Zero Degrees Freedom	Rogue Records America	Mastering	
2013	Thrown into Exile	Thrown into Exile	—N/a	Producer	

==== Singles ====
Year	Artist	Title	Label	Role	Notes
2013	Synthetic Breed	Xenogenesis	Rogue Records America	Mastering	

==== Compilations ====
Year	Artist	Title	Label	Role
2012	Various artists	Terror Metal	Extreme Music	Producer, engineer, mixer, writer
