= Dez Fafara =

American heavy metal vocalist

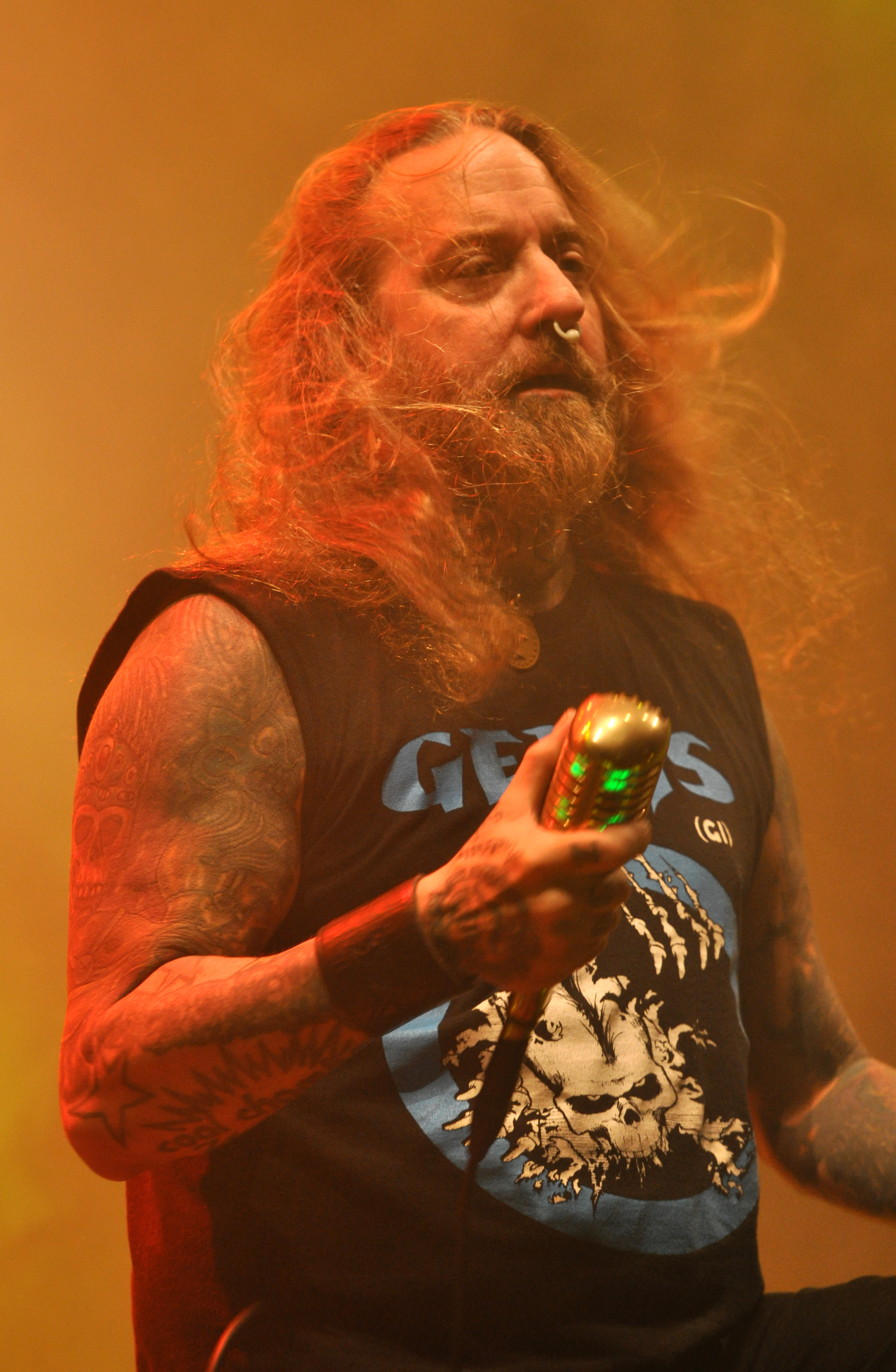
- Fafara performing in 2014

Background information
- Born: Bradley James Fafara
- Genres: Groove metal; nu metal; melodic death metal; alternative metal; gothic metal
- Occupations: Singer
- Years active: 1988–present
- Member of: DevilDriver; Coal Chamber
- Website: devildriver.com

Bradley James "Dez" Fafara is an American vocalist who performs in the metal bands DevilDriver and Coal Chamber.

== Early life ==
Fafara is of Portuguese and Italian descent. His father, Tiger Fafara, and his late uncle, Stanley Fafara, were child actors on the Leave It to Beaver television sitcom.

He has had attention deficit hyperactivity disorder his whole life.

Fafara adopted the nickname "Dez" in honor of Dez Cadena, vocalist and guitarist for Black Flag and an early influence on Fafara.

== Career ==
=== Coal Chamber ===
Fafara released a total of five albums with Coal Chamber. Four of the albums, including Coal Chamber (1997), Chamber Music (1999), and Dark Days (2002), consisted of new material. Two compilation albums were released, one of remixes, rarities, and B-sides, titled Giving the Devil His Due (2003), and a "Best Of" (2004) collection. Coal Chamber disbanded in 2003, shortly after Fafara formed his current band DevilDriver.

On September 26, 2011, it was announced that Coal Chamber would reunite for Australia's Soundwave Festival, which took place in early 2012. As of October 2012, according to Fafara, new material from Coal Chamber is in the works.

Coal Chamber participated in a tour with Sevendust and Stolen Babies in early 2013.

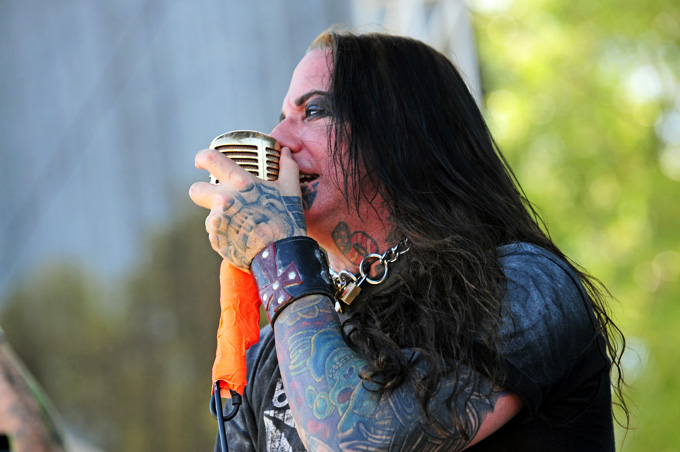
Fafara with Coal Chamber in 2012

According to Fafara, the fourth album was completed in December 2014 before its release in 2015. Coal Chamber now is disbanded and last consisted of the three founding members; Fafara, Miguel Rascon and Mikey Cox, with bassist Nadja Peulen rejoining the band in 2013, having originally played with Coal Chamber in 1999 and 2002. The band collaborated with Ministry's Al Jourgensen for their fourth studio album, titled 'Rivals'.

=== DevilDriver ===
Currently, Fafara, as part of DevilDriver, has released ten studio albums, DevilDriver (2003), The Fury of Our Maker's Hand (2005), The Last Kind Words (2007), Pray for Villains (2009), Beast (2011), Winter Kills (2013), Trust No One (2016), Outlaws 'til the End: Vol. 1 (2018), Dealing with Demons I (2020) and Dealing with Demons II (2023). DevilDriver was also nominated for a Golden Gods Award in 2008 for the best break-through metal band.

=== Collaborations ===
Fafara has appeared on more than twelve soundtrack records, including Scream 3: The Album, which also went gold. He also collaborated with Ozzy Osbourne for a remake of "Shock the Monkey", a song originally by Peter Gabriel, that was released on the Coal Chamber album Chamber Music. This song propelled this record to debut 22 on the Billboard charts upon release.

Fafara recorded and provided vocals for the song "Baptized in the Redemption" on Roadrunner Records' 25th anniversary compilation album Roadrunner United, alongside Dino Cazares (Fear Factory), Andreas Kisser (Sepultura), Paul Gray (Slipknot) and Roy Mayorga (Stone Sour, ex-Soulfly). Dez worked with Nikki Sixx (Mötley Crüe) on a song called "Where Is God Tonight?"

In November 2011, it was announced that Fafara would appear on a track in Soulfly's eighth studio album. The album is titled Enslaved and was released on March 13; the song Fafara appears in is called "Redemption of Man by God." In 2012, he performed on the song "Bastards!" by Canadian hardcore band Cancer Bats on their album Dead Set on Living.

== Management ==
Fafara has founded The Oracle Management, an artist management company. The company currently manages bands like Cradle of Filth and Black Satellite, as well as Fafara's own Coal Chamber and DevilDriver.

== Personal life ==
Fafara's wife is named Anahstasia, and she appears on the cover of the second Coal Chamber album Chamber Music. Fafara has three sons, born in 1991, 1994 and 1997.

Fafara is a vegan. He expresses disgust towards the idea that animals are used for food and feels that people are starting to view plant-based foods as "good for your body, good for the environment." Fafara also said that going vegan made a substantial improvement on his health. Fafara is also freemason, citing his interest in charity for the Navajo nation in the American southwest as the driving factor for him to join.
