= The Complete Roadrunner Collection (1997–2003) =

Box set by Coal Chamber
- Released: March 12, 2013
- Genre: Nu metal, alternative metal, gothic metal, industrial metal
- Label: Roadrunner
- Producer: Various

Coal Chamber chronology
The Best of Coal Chamber (2004)	The Complete Roadrunner Collection (2013)

The Complete Roadrunner Collection (1997–2003) is a box set compilation album by American nu metal band Coal Chamber.

== Background ==
It was made available digitally in the U.S. on March 12, 2013, and was released across Europe both digitally and in CD format on June 3, 2013. The box set includes the band's three studio albums released under Roadrunner Records between 1997 and 2002, as well as the rarities album Giving the Devil His Due.

== Track listing ==
=== Coal Chamber (1997) ===
No.	Title	Length
1.	"Loco"	4:15
2.	"Bradley"	3:04
3.	"Oddity"	3:19
4.	"Unspoiled"	2:59
5.	"Big Truck"	3:31
6.	"Sway"	3:35
7.	"First"	4:12
8.	"I"	4:35
9.	"Clock"	2:59
10.	"My Frustration"	3:59
11.	"Amir of the Desert"	0:44
12.	"Dreamtime"	3:43
13.	"Pig" (The song "Pig" ends at 3:20. After 1 minute and 41 seconds of silence (3:20 - 5:01), begins an untitled hidden track.)	8:27

- "Maricon Puto" and "I" are merged into one track on the physical release of this compilation. However, on Spotify, the two tracks are separate, as is the case with all other versions of the 1997 self-titled album

=== Chamber Music (1999) ===
No.	Title	Length
1.	"Mist" (Instrumental)	0:43
2.	"Tragedy"	2:51
3.	"El Cu Cuy"	4:22
4.	"Untrue"	3:26
5.	"Tyler's Song"	2:49
6.	"What's in Your Mind?"	3:55
7.	"Not Living"	3:50
8.	"Shock the Monkey" (Peter Gabriel cover feat. Ozzy Osbourne)	3:42
9.	"Burgundy"	2:11
10.	"Entwined"	3:49
11.	"Feed My Dreams"	2:55
12.	"My Mercy"	4:04
13.	"No Home"	5:09
14.	"Shari Vegas"	3:16
15.	"Notion"	3:27
16.	"Anything But You"	4:42

=== Dark Days (2002) ===
No.	Title	Length
1.	"Fiend"	3:01
2.	"Glow"	3:12
3.	"Watershed"	2:37
4.	"Something Told Me"	3:24
5.	"Dark Days"	3:40
6.	"Alienate Me"	3:18
7.	"One Step"	2:39
8.	"Friend?"	3:34
9.	"Rowboat" (FLOOD cover)	4:49
10.	"Drove"	3:13
11.	"Empty Jar"	3:53
12.	"Beckoned"	4:03

=== Giving the Devil His Due (2003) ===
No.	Title	Length
1.	"Headstones and the Walking Dead"	3:27
2.	"Big Truck" (Hand-on-Wheel Mix)	3:32
3.	"Pig" (Original Version)	3:22
4.	"Bradley" (Going Postal Mix)	3:04
5.	"Sway" (Hypno-Submissive Mix)	3:26
6.	"Not Living" (Original Version)	3:52
7.	"Blisters"	4:52
8.	"El Cu Cuy" (Man-to-Monster Mix)	4:19
9.	"Wishes"	3:07
10.	"Apparition"	2:28
11.	"Anxiety"	3:14
12.	"Save Yourself"	3:26
13.	"One Step" (Chop Shop Mix)	2:40
14.	"Big Truck" (Live)	3:24
15.	"I" (Demo)	3:39
16.	"Oddity" (Demo)	4:05
17.	"Sway" (Demo)	3:30
18.	"Unspoiled" (Demo)	3:37
19.	"Loco" (Demo)	3:38
20.	"Babbit" (Demo)	2:58
