= The Best of Coal Chamber =

Greatest hits album by Coal Chamber
- Released: August 10, 2004
- Recorded: 1994–2002
- Genre: Nu metal
- Length: 42:06
- Label: Roadrunner
- Producer: Jay Gordon; Jay Baumgardner; Josh Abraham; Ross Hogarth

Coal Chamber chronology
Giving the Devil His Due (2003)	The Best of Coal Chamber (2004)	The Complete Roadrunner Collection (2013)

Professional ratings
Review scores
Source	Rating
AllMusic	3.5/5 stars
CDNow	4/5 stars
Kerrang!	2/5 stars

The Best of Coal Chamber is a compilation album by the American nu metal band Coal Chamber, released through Roadrunner Records on August 10, 2004 on CD. The album mixes several tracks from their three studio albums, Coal Chamber, Chamber Music, Dark Days, recorded from 1994 to 2002. It received 3.5 stars from AllMusic.

== Background ==
The first five tracks of the album are all featured on Coal Chamber's self-titled debut album. The album was recorded at NRG Recording, North Hollywood, CA in 1996. Produced by Jay Gordon through Roadrunner Records, the album has been certified Gold by the RIAA, with an excess of 500,000 copies in the United States. A special edition version of the album was released in 2005, featuring 6 extra tracks. The live footage on the special edition was shot at the Whisky a Go Go in LA, CA, 1996, which was included in Kerrang! 100 greatest gigs of all time.

On September 7, 1999, Roadrunner Records released Chamber Music. There are 18 tracks on the album, 4 of which are featured on The Best of Coal Chamber. Dark Days is the third studio album by Coal Chamber. It was recorded in 2001 and released on May 7, 2002. "Fiend", a track featured on this compilation, is the album's only single. Its music video found airplay on Uranium, which also featured an interview with the band.

=== Reception ===
The compilation did not receive many reviews by critics. AllMusic gave the album 3.5 out 5 stars, but did not publicize any further reviews.

== Track listing ==
No.	Title	Album	Length
1.	"Loco"	Coal Chamber	4:15
2.	"Oddity"	Coal Chamber	3:19
3.	"Big Truck" (Hand-on-Wheel Mix)	Giving the Devil His Due	3:31
4.	"Sway"	Coal Chamber	3:35
5.	"Clock"	Coal Chamber	2:59
6.	"Not Living"	Chamber Music	3:50
7.	"El Cu Cuy"	Chamber Music	4:22
8.	"Tyler's Song"	Chamber Music	2:49
9.	"My Mercy"	Chamber Music	4:04
10.	"Fiend"	Dark Days	3:01
11.	"Something Told Me"	Dark Days	3:24
12.	"Dark Days"	Dark Days	3:40
13.	"Beckoned"	Dark Days	4:03
14.	"One Step" (Chop Shop Mix)	Giving the Devil His Due	2:39

== Personnel ==
Coal Chamber

- Dez Fafara - vocals
- Miguel Rascón - guitar
- Nadja Peulen - bass
- Rayna Foss - bass
- Mikey Cox - drums

Production

- Josh Abraham - producer
- Aimee Echo - backing vocals
- Jay Baumgardner - mixing
- David Bianco and Amir Derakh - additional mixing
- Tom Burleigh - compilation producer
- Caroline Greyshock - photography, cover photo
- Bryan Reesman - liner notes
