= Coal Chamber (album) =

Studio album by Coal Chamber
- Released: February 11, 1997
- Studio: NRG (North Hollywood)
- Genre: Nu metal
- Length: 49:22
- Label: Roadrunner
- Producers: Jay Gordon; Jay Baumgardner

Coal Chamber chronology
Coal Chamber (1997)	Chamber Music (1999)

Singles from Coal Chamber
- 1. "Loco" Released: June 22, 1998

Alternate cover
- Alternate promo edition cover

Coal Chamber is the debut studio album by American nu metal band Coal Chamber. It was released on February 11, 1997, by Roadrunner Records and contains the single "Loco". The special edition of the album contains the bonus tracks "Headstones and the Walking Dead", "Big Truck (Hand-On-Wheel Mix)", "Pig (Demo)", "Sway (Demo)", "Unspoiled (Demo)", and "Loco (Demo)" (all of which are available on Giving the Devil His Due). The DVD features two of the band's concerts, a live video of "Loco", and the music video of "Loco".

It has been certified gold by the RIAA, with an excess of 500,000 copies in the United States and is the band's most successful album. Three singles were released on the album: "Loco", "Big Truck", and "Sway". "Big Truck" was released in 1997, while "Loco" and "Sway" were released in 1998. "Loco", "Big Truck", "Sway", "Oddity", and "Clock" were included on their greatest hits album.

== Background and recording ==
Coal Chamber was formed in Los Angeles in 1992 by vocalist Dez Fafara and guitarist Miguel "Meegs" Rascón, originally under the name She's in Pain. They met after simultaneously putting out ads looking for a guitarist and vocalist, respectively, and bonded over a mutual love for the Sisters of Mercy. After a few shows, they adopted their present name in 1993. By spring 1994, their lineup had solidified, featuring bassist Rayna Foss and drummer John Tor. Coal Chamber recorded a demo tape in August 1994, which was given to Roadrunner Records head of A&R Monte Conner by producer Ross Robinson. Fear Factory guitarist Dino Cazares also recommended the band to Conner. Roadrunner subsequently offered the band a record deal, but as they were negotiating, Fafara left Coal Chamber due to disagreements with his wife. The band were unable to find a replacement for him and so "just partied and wasted time", according to Fafara.

After eight months, Rascón visited Fafara and asked him to return to Coal Chamber, who became active again by spring 1995. Conner was unaware that Coal Chamber had reunited until Dino Cazares gave him a new demo from the band during the mixing sessions of Fear Factory's Demanufacture (1995), after which he reconnected with the band. The band were in negotiations with Roadrunner for over a year before they officially signed to the label, in December 1995. A few weeks prior to their signing, John Tor was fired for "constantly fighting" with Rascón, after which they hired Mikey Cox as their new drummer.

Coal Chamber was recorded in 45–50 days with producers Jay Gordon and Jay Baumgardner at NRG Recording Studios in North Hollywood, California. Ross Robinson had been expected to produce the album. In a 1998 interview with RockOnline, Fafara said that whilst he had "a lot of respect" for him, Coal Chamber believed that Robinson would have turned them into something that they were not. He later said that the band "ran away" from him and selected Gordon and Baumgardner instead because people were comparing them to Korn. The band knew of Gordon through Rascón, and Baumgardner was the owner of NRG Studios. Neither had worked on a full-length album before. Roadrunner initially gave Coal Chamber a hard time about choosing their own producers, but relented after Gordon sent a demo of "Pig" to Monte Conner, who was impressed by its recording quality. (Note: Monte Conner said that although he was put off by Jay Gordon's "cocky manner" when they first spoke, he "won my faith by taking the bull by the horns" with the "Pig" demo and his "go-getter" attitude. Conner later considered the demo superior to the album version.) Fafara recorded most of his vocals live, though he used a RadioShack bullhorn on tracks such as "Loco" and "Clock". Korn bassist Reginald "Fieldy" Arvizu loaned all of his gear to Foss during the album's recording; she also borrowed a five-string bass from Gordon on "Clock".

== Music and lyrics ==
The album's sound has been compared to Korn and White Zombie. Regarding potential comparisons to Korn, Rascón stated in an April 1997 interview "We take it as a compliment. Korn's a great band. People have to compare us to something, I guess. We also get White Zombie and Marilyn Manson a lot." The song "Sway" includes the line, "the roof the roof the roof is on fire we don't need no water let the motherfucker burn burn motherfucker burn", which is taken from the song "The Roof Is on Fire" by Rock Master Scott & the Dynamic Three.

A number of the album's songs are about Fafara's ex-wife, who left him on the day he began recording vocals. About the meaning of the song "Loco", Dez Fafara explains: "That's about living in Los Angeles and just wanting to do something different. And having a persona around myself where people think I'm a little nuts, but really I'm crazy for music. I was living in Los Angeles, trying to come out of that environment after it was totally devastated by hair metal and everything else. No one was going to clubs, there was no real scene in Los Angeles until bands like Coal Chamber and Deftones came out of LA. So that's what 'Loco' is about". The interlude "Amir of the Desert" was written about Amir Derakh, the album's engineer. Fafara said the song came about from the band "fucking around one afternoon and I was stoned."

== Release and promotion ==
Coal Chamber was released in the United States on February 11, 1997, and in the United Kingdom on March 17, 1997. Conner said that the album was not initially considered a priority at Roadrunner, and as such the label did not ship a large amount of copies or have a music video filmed before its release. Prior to releasing the album, the band were already known in heavy metal circles for performing at the inaugural edition of Ozzfest in 1996, which also led to Sharon Osbourne becoming their manager. Mark Palmer, the manager of Roadrunner's UK branch, said that the album's buzz was "something we haven't experienced since the first Machine Head record, Burn My Eyes [(1994)]". The album debuted and peaked at number 76 on the UK Albums Chart. It also debuted at number seven on the UK Rock & Metal Albums Chart, where it logged 57 weeks on the chart across several stints.

In its first week of release, Coal Chamber only sold 844 copies in the United States. The album debuted at number 43 on the Billboard Heatseekers Album Chart on January 18, 1998. By April 1998, it had sold 240,000 copies in the United States. It peaked at number 10 on the Heatseekers Albums chart on August 8, 1998. The album was selling 5,000 copies per week at its peak, and continued to sell consistently for three years. On December 21, 1999, the album was certified Gold by the Recording Industry Association of America (RIAA), signifying the album had shipped in excess of 500,000 copies. However, Nielsen Soundscan, which tracks album sales, reported that it had sold approximately 448,000 copies by March 2002.

To support the album, Coal Chamber toured heavily throughout the entirety of 1997, sharing the stage with artists such as Anthrax, Danzig, Downset., Faith No More, Grip Inc., Helmet, Machine Head, Pantera, Sevendust, Soilent Green and Type O Negative. In the summer of 1997, they performed at Ozzfest, their second consecutive appearance at the festival. In October 1997, "Loco" was serviced to radio stations in the United States. A music video for the song was filmed with director Nathan 'Karma' Cox, a longtime friend of the band. Like Gordon and Baumgardner, Cox had not directed a video before. He would go on to direct videos for bands such as Disturbed, Linkin Park and Queens of the Stone Age in the early 2000s. On June 22, 1998, "Loco" was commercially released as a single in the United Kingdom, where it reached number 80 on the UK Singles Chart. The touring cycle lasted up until mid-1998, after which the band began focusing on a follow-up.

== Critical reception ==
=== Contemporary reviews ===
Professional ratings
Review scores
Source	Rating
Chicago Sun-Times	1/4 stars
Chronicles of Chaos	5/10
In Music We Trust	9/10
Kerrang!	4/5 stars
Ox-Fanzine	1/5 stars
Rock Hard	4.5/10
Select	1/5 stars

Coal Chamber received mixed reviews upon its release. Johnathan Selzer of Melody Maker acknowledged that whilst Coal Chamber could be accused of being "copyists" of Korn and Sepultura, he believed the elements taken from those artists (and others) were all "means to an end" and that the album ultimately "rocks". Kerrang!'s Mike Peake considered the album "the biggest, meanest, heaviest noise [...] in months", though noted it was "not perfect—it's hardly what you'd call new, and it does lack the production punch of something like Demanufacture". Ollie of In Music We Trust singled out Dez Fafara as the album's star quality, calling him "a born frontman" and "probably what has made me so addicted to this album."

Chronicles of Chaos writer Adrian Bromley compared it to Korn and Deftones, remarking that he had "a hard time telling these bands apart." However, Bromley noted a difference with Coal Chamber was the band's strong sense of groove. In an unfavorable review, Ian Winwood of Metal Hammer stated that the band were "lame" and "[sounded] like music that's being played on autopilot." He concluded that whilst he could see the band "becoming huge, the one thing I can't ever see them being is any good. At all." (Note: Ian Winwood gave the album two stars out of five. In the same space, it received different reviews and scores from three other Metal Hammer reviewers: Robyn Doreian, Dan Silver and Chris Ingham.) Tom Phillips of Select dismissed the album as "histrionic wank", and said that it had "less guts than a filleted flounder."

=== Retrospective reviews ===
Professional ratings
Review scores
Source	Rating
AllMusic	3/5 stars
Collector's Guide to Heavy Metal	8/10
The Encyclopedia of Popular Music	3/5 stars
The Great Rock Discography	7/10
Kerrang!	3/5 stars

Retrospective reviews remain similarly mixed. Reviewing the 2005 CD and DVD reissue for AllMusic, Johnny Loftus labelled "Loco", "Sway" and "Oddity" as "classics of a late-'90s L.A. metal scene that included Korn, Deftones, Fear Factory, and System of a Down." He goes on to say whilst "Coal Chamber couldn't keep it up for a whole album", criticizing Fafara's lyrics and its "unimaginative two-note guitar riffs", it was "still an interesting listen, especially in relation to what they did differently from their peers." Steve Huey, also of AllMusic felt that the album was not original and lacked consistency and memorable riffs, but would still appeal to fans of alternative metal.

In a review for Kerrang!, Paul Travers wrote that although Coal Chamber ultimately did not experience the same level of commercial success as their contemporaries, "for a brief time, at the dawn of nu metal, they were right there at the vanguard of a brand new sound that was—whatever hindsight might have to say about it—big, brash and utterly exciting." In 2014, Thomas Lacey gave the album an unfavorable review for Rock Sound, stating that the album bore "a deeply unsettling sense of awareness from the band, a coldness that stems from knowing damn well that the music they're producing fills a gap in the market, nothing more". Lacey also criticized the track "Amir of the Desert", claiming it presents the band "[trying] their hand at some casual racism [...], complete with a 'comedy' indian accent that even the cast of Mrs. Brown's Boys would wince at."

=== Accolades ===
Publication	List	Year	Rank	Ref.
Kerrang!	100 Albums You Must Hear Before You Die	1998	99	
Kerrang!	666 Albums You Must Hear Before You Die!	2011	N/A	
Kerrang!	The 21 greatest nu-metal albums of all time	2020	15	
LA Weekly	The 10 Greatest Nu-Metal Albums	2016	9	
Loudwire	The 50 Best Nu-Metal Albums of All Time	2020	35	
Metal Hammer	Top 20 best metal albums of 1997	2020	N/A	
Metal Hammer	The 50 best nu metal albums of all time	2022	23	
Revolver	20 Essential Nu Metal albums	2021	N/A	

== Track listing ==
All lyrics are written by Dez Fafara; all music is written by Miguel Rascón, Rayna Foss and Mike Cox except where noted.

No.	Title	Music	Length
1.	"Loco"		4:15
2.	"Bradley"		3:04
3.	"Oddity"		3:19
4.	"Unspoiled"		2:59
5.	"Big Truck"		3:31
6.	"Sway"		3:35
7.	"First"		4:12
8.	"Maricon Puto"		0:46
9.	"I"		3:49
10.	"Clock"		2:59
11.	"My Frustration"		3:59
12.	"Amir of the Desert"	Rayna Foss; Mike Cox	0:44
13.	"Dreamtime"		3:43
14.	"Pig"		8:27
Total length:			49:22

- On The Complete Roadrunner Collection (1997–2003), "Maricon Puto" and "I" are merged into one track.
- The song "Pig" ends at 3:20. After 1 minute and 41 seconds of silence (3:20 – 5:01), begins an untitled hidden track consisting of studio outtakes in which Jonathan Davis from Korn talks at the very end.

== Special edition ==
A special edition of the album was released by Roadrunner in 2005. The package includes the original album with six bonus tracks along with a bonus DVD featuring the "Loco" music video and two live concerts. The concerts are live at the Whisky a Go Go in Los Angeles in 1996, which was included in Kerrang!'s 100 greatest gigs of all time, and live at the Maritime Hall in San Francisco, 1999.

=== Bonus tracks on special edition ===
No.	Title	Length
15.	"Headstones and the Walking Dead"	3:27
16.	"Big Truck" (Hand-On-Wheel Mix)	3:32
17.	"Pig" (Demo)	3:21
18.	"Sway" (Demo)	3:30
19.	"Unspoiled" (Demo)	3:38
20.	"Loco" (Demo)	3:38
Total length:		70:28

== Personnel ==
Personnel per liner notes.

Coal Chamber
- Dez Fafara – lead vocals
- Miguel Rascón – guitars, backing vocals
- Rayna Foss – bass
- Mike Cox – drums

Additional personnel

- Jay Gordon – additional vocals on ("Oddity" & "Maricon Puto")
- Nathan "Karma" Cox – additional vocals on ("Clock")
- Eric Levy – additional vocals on ("Sway"), additional percussion on ("Maricon Puto")

Production

- Jay Gordon – production, mixing
- Jay Baumgardner – production, mixing
- Amir Derakh – engineering, mixing
- Lisa Lewis – assistant engineer
Artwork
- Marina Chavez – photography
- CIEL – design

2005 Reissue

- Monte Conner – production
- Giulio Constanzo – art direction
- Laurie Es – additional design
- Kevin Estranda – production, photography
- Steven Hartong – assistant production
- Ted Jensen – remastering

== Charts ==
=== Album ===
Chart (1997–99)	Peak position
Scottish Albums (OCC)	96
UK Albums (OCC)	76
UK Rock & Metal Albums (OCC)	7
US Heatseekers Albums (Billboard)	10

=== Singles ===
Year	Chart	Song	Position
1998	UK Singles Chart (OCC)	"Loco"	80

== Certifications ==
Region	Certification	Certified units/sales
United States (RIAA)	Gold	500,000^{^}
^{^} Shipments figures based on certification alone.

== Release history ==
Release history for Coal Chamber
Region	Label	Format	Date	Catalog #	Ref.
United States	Roadrunner	CD; CS	February 11, 1997	RR-9913-2	
United Kingdom	Roadrunner	CD; CS	March 17, 1997	RR-9913-2	
Various	Roadrunner	CD + DVD	September 20, 2005	168 618 118-2	
Various	Round Hill	LP	February 9, 2024	TRCR-113	

== Bibliography ==
- Alexander, Phil (January 25, 1997). "Hot: Coal Chamber". Kerrang!. No. 632. EMAP. p. 13.
- Anon. (March 15, 1997). "Ad Focus" (PDF). Music Week. UBM plc. p. 24. Archived (PDF) from the original on May 20, 2024 – via worldradiohistory.com.
- Anon (October 31, 1997). "Rock" (PDF). Album Network. No. 967. p. 8 – via worldradiohistory.com.
- Anon. (January 17, 1998). "Billboard's Heatseekers Album Chart". Billboard. Vol. 110, no. 3. p. 24.
- Anon. (April 24, 1998). "Coal Chamber "Sway (The Roof is on Fire)"" (PDF). R&R (Advertisement). No. 1245. p. 48 – via worldradiohistory.com.
- Anon. (August 8, 1998). "Billboard's Heatseekers Album Chart". Billboard. Vol. 110, no. 32. p. 80.
- Arnopp, Jason (October 4, 1997). "Have I Got Noose For You". Kerrang!. No. 668. EMAP. pp. 26–28.
- Blake, Mark (April 12, 1997). "Heavy Rock: Coal Chamber" (PDF). Music Week. UBM plc. p. 24 – via worldradiohistory.com.
- Dome, Malcolm, ed. (June 20, 1998). "Chamber get 'Blisters'". Kerrang!. No. 704. EMAP. p. 4.
- Fafara, Dez; Peake, Mike (January 17, 1998). "100 Albums You Must Hear Before You Die!". Kerrang!. No. 682. EMAP. p. 22.
- Larkin, Colin, ed. (2006). "Coal Chamber". The Encyclopedia of Popular Music. Vol. 2 (4th ed.). MUZE. p. 433. ISBN 9780195313734.
- Peake, Mike (March 15, 1997). "The Lunatic Fringe | Albums". Kerrang!. No. 639. EMAP. p. 44.
- Popoff, Martin (2007). The Collector's Guide to Heavy Metal: Volume 3: The Nineties. Burlington, Ontario, Canada: Collector's Guide Publishing. pp. 83–84. ISBN 978-1-894959-62-9.
- Selzer, Johnathan (April 5, 1997). "Albums". Melody Maker. Vol. 74, no. 14. IPC. p. 45.
- Strong, Martin Charles (2002). "Coal Chamber". The Great Rock Discography (6th ed.). Canongate. p. 210. ISBN 9781841953113 – via Internet Archive.
- Travers, Paul (November 2011). "Coal Chamber: Coal Chamber". Kerrang!: 666 Albums You Must Hear Before You Die!. Bauer Media Group. p. 26.
- Vollmer, Carsten (January 1997). "Reviews". Ox-Fanzine. No. 26. p. 58 – via Internet Archive.
- Wiederhorn, John; Turman, Katherine (2013). Louder Than Hell: The Definitive Oral History of Metal. Dey Street. ISBN 978-0-06-195829-8.
- Williams, Kevin M. (October 19, 1997). "Spin Control". Chicago Sun-Times (Showcase). p. 12.
- Winwood, Ian; Doreian, Robyn; Silver, Dan; Ingham, Chris (April 1997). "Under the Hammer". Metal Hammer. UK: Dennis Publishing. p. 65.
