= Ozzfest Live =

The Ozzfest Live

Live album by Various Artists
- Released: April 29, 1997
- Recorded: October 25–26, 1996
- Genre: Heavy metal, alternative metal, nu metal, metalcore, hardcore punk, groove metal, industrial metal, thrash metal
- Label: Red Ant

Various Artists chronology
The Ozzfest Live (1997)	Ozzfest: Second Stage Live (2001)

Professional ratings
Review scores
Source	Rating
Allmusic	2.5/5 stars

The Ozzfest Live is a compilation of live tracks taken from the first Ozzfest tour. The tracks were recorded at two different Ozzfest dates on October 25–26, 1996.

== Track listing ==
1. Coal Chamber - Loco
2. Cellophane - Ride Thy Neighbor
3. Earth Crisis - Broken Foundation
4. Powerman 5000 - Organizized
5. Neurosis - Locust Star
6. Fear Factory - Replica
7. Biohazard - These Eyes
8. Sepultura - Attitude
9. Slayer - Angel of Death
10. Ozzy Osbourne - Perry Mason
