= Ozzfest: Second Stage Live =

Live album by Various Artists
- Released: March 27, 2001
- Genre: Heavy metal
- Label: Divine
- Producer: Tim Palmer

Various Artists chronology
The Ozzfest Live (1997)	Ozzfest: Second Stage Live (2001)	Ozzfest 2001: The Second Millennium (2001)

Ozzfest: Second Stage Live is a live recording of Ozzfest 2000.

== Track listing ==
Disc 1

1. "Eye For An Eye" - Soulfly
2. "Voices" - Disturbed
3. "Pushing Me" - Slaves on Dope
4. "Suck" - Kittie
5. "The Big F*** You" - Primer 55
6. "Ode To Clarissa" - Queens of the Stone Age
7. "Keep It Clean" - Pitchshifter
8. "Mirror's Reflection" - Taproot
9. "Pain" - Soulfly
10. I Don't Know - Ozzy Osbourne

Disc 2

1. "Loco" - Coal Chamber
2. "Broken Foundation" - Earth Crisis
3. "Organizized" - Powerman 5000
4. "Locust Star" - Neurosis
5. "Replica" - Fear Factory
6. "These Eyes" - Biohazard
7. "Attitude" - Sepultura
8. "Angel of Death" - Slayer
9. "Perry Mason" - Ozzy Osbourne
