= Rivals (Coal Chamber album) =

Studio album by Coal Chamber
- Released: May 19, 2015
- Recorded: October–December 2014
- Studio: Audio Hammer (Sanford, Florida)
- Genres: Nu metal; groove metal
- Length: 41:34
- Label: Napalm
- Producer: Mark Lewis

Coal Chamber chronology
| Dark Days (2002) | Rivals (2015) |

Singles from Rivals
- 1. "I.O.U Nothing" Released: March 2, 2015; 2. "Rivals" Released: March 9, 2015

Professional ratings
Review scores
| Source | Rating |
|---|---|
| AllMusic | (positive) |
| Blabbermouth.net | 8/10 |
| Metal.de | 7/10 |
| Metal Hammer | 7/10 |
| Metal Storm | 6.0/10 |
| New Noise Magazine | 5/5 stars |
| Rock Hard | 6/10 |
| Teen Ink | 8/10 |

Rivals is the fourth studio album by American nu metal band Coal Chamber, released on May 19, 2015, through Napalm Records. It was the band's first release since Dark Days (2002), and their first with bassist Nadja Peulen.

== Background ==
In August 2014, Coal Chamber announced that they had signed to Napalm Records and that they would begin work on a new album. The band entered pre-production for Rivals in late September, and began recording the album in October. On December 11, 2014, the band announced they had finished recording the album.

== Music ==
Described as groove metal and nu metal, Rivals has been compared to all of the previous Coal Chamber albums, being described as most similar to the band's third album Dark Days. In a 2015 review of the album, 100% Rock magazine wrote that "Coal Chamber have taken the nu metal styling of the early 2000s and modernized the sound for the current day". The album Rivals shows Coal Chamber moving away from their gothic sound.

== Release ==
On February 13, 2015, Coal Chamber announced Rivals. On March 2, 2015, the first single released from the album was "I.O.U. Nothing". On March 9, 2015, "Rivals", was released as the album's second single. Rivals was released on May 19, 2015. The album sold 7,100 copies in its first week of release to debut at number 82 on the Billboard 200 chart.

== Track listing ==
All lyrics are written by Dez Fafara; all music is composed by Mikey Cox and Meegs Rascón.

| No. | Title | Length |
|---|---|---|
| 1. | "I.O.U. Nothing" | 3:03 |
| 2. | "Bad Blood Between Us" | 4:00 |
| 3. | "Light in the Shadows" | 3:41 |
| 4. | "Suffer in Silence" (featuring Al Jourgensen of Ministry) | 3:51 |
| 5. | "The Bridges You Burn" | 3:37 |
| 6. | "Orion" | 1:11 |
| 7. | "Another Nail in the Coffin" | 3:21 |
| 8. | "Rivals" | 4:31 |
| 9. | "Wait" | 2:44 |
| 10. | "Dumpster Dive" | 1:09 |
| 11. | "Over My Head" | 3:36 |
| 12. | "Fade Away (Karma Never Forgets)" | 2:52 |
| 13. | "Empty Handed" | 3:58 |
| Total length: | | 41:34 |

Best Buy exclusive bonus track
| No. | Title | Length |
|---|---|---|
| 14. | "Worst Enemy" | 4:03 |

== Personnel ==
- Dez Fafara – vocals
- Miguel Rascón – guitars
- Mike Cox – drums
- Nadja Peulen – bass
- Al Jourgensen – additional vocals (track 4)
- Mark Lewis – production, mixing, mastering

== Charts ==
| Chart (2015) | Peak position |
|---|---|
| Belgian Albums (Ultratop Flanders) | 177 |
| Belgian Albums (Ultratop Wallonia) | 148 |
