= NRG Recording Studios =

Recording studio in Los Angeles, California, US

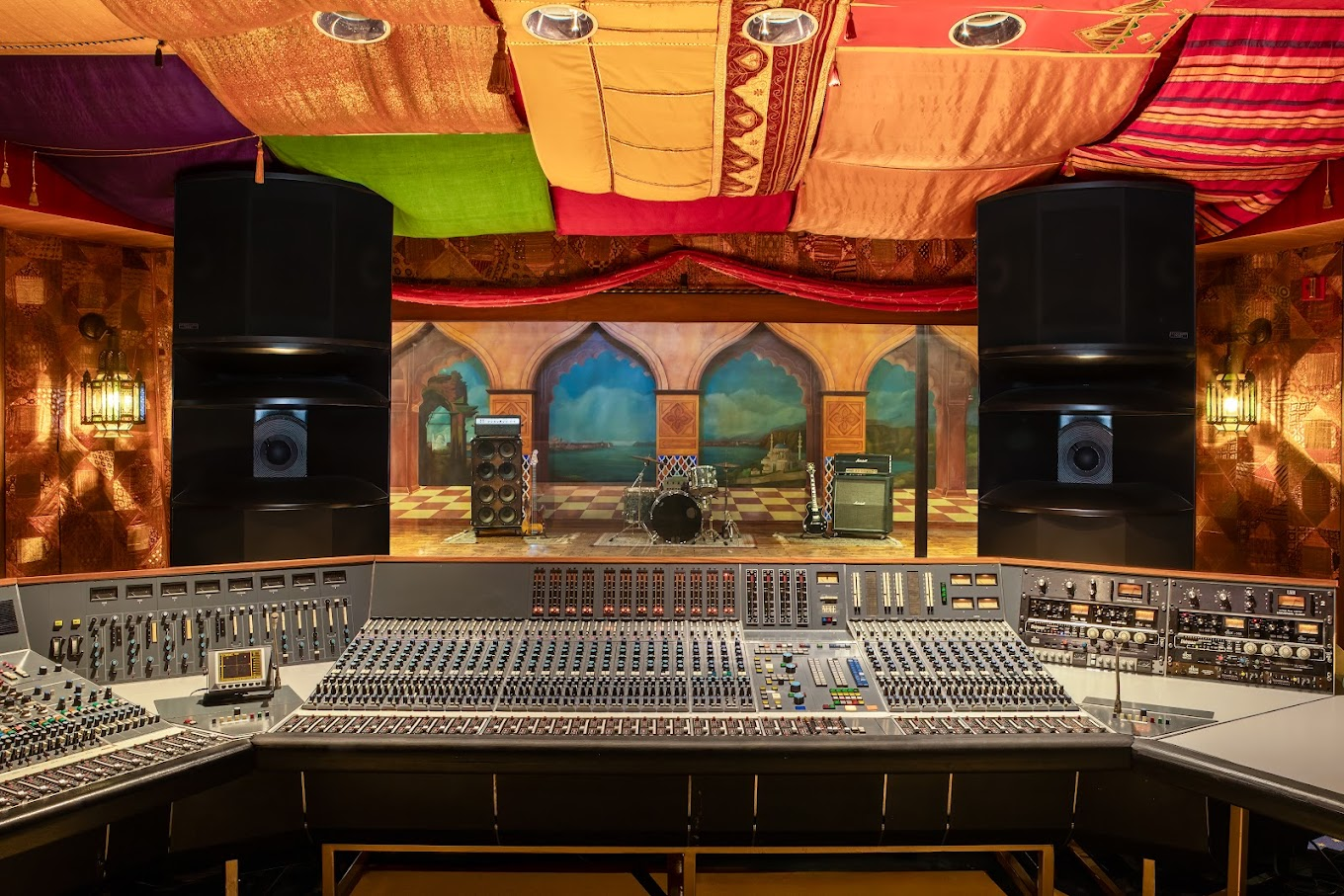
- Type: Recording studio
- Industry: Music
- Founded: 1992; 34 years ago
- Headquarters: 11128 Weddington St, North Hollywood, Los Angeles, California 91601
- Area served: North Hollywood, Los Angeles, California
- Website: www.nrgrecording.com

NRG Recording Studios is a recording facility located in North Hollywood, California, that was created by producer and mixer Jay Baumgardner in 1992.

== History ==
Before starting NRG Recording Studio, Jay Baumgardner operated from a home based studio and grow out the space. In 1995, the studio space formerly named Weddington Productions became available for rent, so Baumgardner initially rented the space, but he was able to purchase the building later. The building was located in the area of NoHo Arts District that was not yet developed like it is today.

It started out with one studio space and slowly grow to 3 Studios (A, B and C), as funds became available.The space has also been remodeled multiple times.

The studio evolved from handling TV gigs like The Dolly Parton Show to becoming a hub for various music genres, particularly country and Christian music.

NRG Recording gained prominence with notable productions like Hootie & the Blowfish's 1994 debut album, Cracked Rear View.

== Facilities ==
The facility consists of three studios:

- Studio A : 110-square-meter live area, three isolation booths, and a 64-input Neve 8068 console built by Pat Schneider
- Studio B : 30 x 40 foot live room with a distinctive Moroccan-theme and a large control room housing a custom "wrap-around" 64-input Neve 80 Series console
- Studio C : designed for production and mixing, features a 24-input Neve BCM10 Mk II console

== Selected albums recorded ==
- Cracked Rear View – Hootie & the Blowfish (1994)
- Coal Chamber – Coal Chamber (1997)
- Transistor – 311 (1997)
- Ozomatli – Ozomatli (1998)
- Follow the Leader – Korn (1998)
- Significant Other – Limp Bizkit (1999)
- Lit - A Place In The Sun (1999)
- Infest – Papa Roach (2000)
- Hybrid Theory – Linkin Park (2000)
- Conspiracy of One – The Offspring (2000)
- Anthology – Alien Ant Farm (2001)
- Break the Cycle – Staind (2001)
- Crown Royal – Run-DMC (2001)
- Lit - Atomic (2001)
- Disclaimer – Seether (2002)
- Fallen – Evanescence (2003)
- Meteora – Linkin Park (2003)
- Contraband – Velvet Revolver (2004)
- Minutes to Midnight – Linkin Park (2007)
- A Thousand Suns – Linkin Park (2010)
- Living Things – Linkin Park (2012)
- Rise – Skillet (2013)
- Release the Panic – Red (2013)
- One Assassination Under God – Chapter 1 – Marilyn Manson (2024)
- One Assassination Under God – Chapter 2 – Marilyn Manson (2026)
