= Ozzfest 2001: The Second Millennium =

Live album by Various Artists
- Released: August 14, 2001
- Recorded: June 9 and 11, 2001
- Genre: Heavy metal; nu metal; hardcore punk
- Label: Sony
- Producer: Sharon Osbourne

Various Artists chronology
Ozzfest: Second Stage Live (2001)	Ozzfest 2001: The Second Millennium (2001)	Ozzfest 2002 (2002)

Professional ratings
Review scores
Source	Rating
Allmusic	2/5 stars

Ozzfest 2001: The Second Millennium is a compilation of live recordings from Ozzfest 2001.

== Track listing ==
No.	Title	Artist	Length
1.	"The Wizard"	Black Sabbath	4:38
2.	"The Love Song"	Marilyn Manson	3:10
3.	"New Abortion"	Slipknot	3:57
4.	"Blood Brothers"	Papa Roach	3:31
5.	"With You"	Linkin Park	3:30
6.	"Super Terrorizer"	Black Label Society	6:12
7.	"Fear"	Disturbed	3:54
8.	"Death Blooms"	Mudvayne	5:14
9.	"Bodies"	Drowning Pool	3:23
10.	"South Texas Deathride"	The Union Underground	3:37
11.	"Fillthee"	Otep	3:35
12.	"What a Day"	Nonpoint	4:30
13.	"Last Breath"	Hatebreed	2:06
14.	"Deep Colors Bleed"	Systematic	4:20
15.	"Kiss of Death"	Pure Rubbish	4:06
16.	"Reach and Touch"	American Head Charge	5:11
