= Shock the Monkey =

1982 single by Peter Gabriel

Single by Peter Gabriel

from the album Peter Gabriel (Security)
- B-side: "Soft Dog"
- Released: 10 September 1982
- Recorded: 23 June 1981 – 10 July 1982
- Genre: Synth-pop
- Length: 3:57 (single edit); 5:28 (album version)
- Label: Charisma (UK) Geffen (US)
- Songwriter: Peter Gabriel
- Producers: David Lord; Peter Gabriel

Peter Gabriel singles chronology
"I Don't Remember" (1980)	"Shock the Monkey" (1982)	"I Have the Touch" (1982)

Music video
- "Shock the Monkey" on YouTube

"Shock the Monkey" is a song by the English rock musician Peter Gabriel. It was released in September 1982 by Charisma Records as the first single from his fourth self-titled studio album, issued in the US under the title Security.

The song peaked at number 29 on the US Billboard Hot 100 chart and number one on the Billboard Hot Mainstream Rock Tracks chart. The song was Gabriel's first Top 40 hit in the US. In the UK, the song charted at number 58. According to AllMusic, the song has a "relentlessly repeated hook" that "sounded nothing like anything else on the radio at the time".

== Interpretation ==
Due to its title and the content of the music video, "Shock the Monkey" is frequently assumed to be either an animal rights song or a reference to the famous experiments by Stanley Milgram described in his book Obedience to Authority (1974). It is neither, but the Gabriel song "We Do What We're Told (Milgram's 37)" from his fifth studio album So (1986) does deal directly with Milgram. Gabriel has characterised "Shock the Monkey" as "a love song" that examines how jealousy can release one's basic instincts; the monkey is not a literal monkey, but a metaphor for one's feelings of jealousy.

Gabriel stated in an interview with Sounds magazine that "Shock the Monkey" presented him with the most difficulties lyrically. He mentioned that the song's lyrical motif was inspired by King Kong's lightning powers in the film King Kong vs. Godzilla (1962). For the song's musical arrangement, Gabriel intended to emulate influences of 1960s Motown music and believed that the final recording that appeared on his fourth studio album was stylistically more modern.

== Releases ==
"Shock the Monkey" was released as a 7-inch single on 10 September 1982 with the non-album track "Soft Dog" included as the B-side. The song was later included on the compilation albums Greenpeace (1985), Shaking the Tree: Sixteen Golden Greats (1990) and Hit (2003). Live renditions were included on Plays Live (1983), Live in Athens 1987 (2013), Back to Front: Live in London (2014), and Live at WOMAD 1982 (2025). The music video appears on the DVD compilation Play (2004).

== Critical reception ==
Robin Smith of Record Mirror felt that Gabriel sang "Shock the Monkey" "with passion" and expressed their belief that it lacked the same impact as Gabriel's "Games Without Frontiers" single. Writing for Sounds magazine, Sandy Robertson said the song capitalised on repetition and Gabriel's "shrieking vocals". Billboard called it a "mysterious but infectious track...which melds synthesizers, distinctive vocal and dance rhythms to fresh effect."

== Music video ==
The song's music video was written and directed by Brian Grant of MGMM Studios, and produced by Scott Millaney. The video was played heavily in the early days of MTV. It features Gabriel (in white face paint) and a frightened-looking capuchin monkey. Gabriel appears in two guises; one is as a businessman/CIA-MK-Ultra-type in a dark suit, and the other as a "modern primitive" shaman painted and dressed in white with geometric markings in black on his face.

The video cuts between two rooms, each vaguely resembling an office. A movie projector plays zoo footage of a gibbon (technically, a lesser ape, not a monkey) in both rooms. As the video proceeds, events in the 'normal' (black suit) office become increasingly irregular and disturbing with objects in the room in increasing disarray. Gabriel displays increasing pressure, anger, and fear as the chaos occurs, at one point being restrained by three little people. The office footage is increasingly interspersed with black-and-white footage of Gabriel fleeing from something unknown in a wilderness, and a disoriented Gabriel in different settings including central London in what looks to be the office of a hospital. At the end of the video, the two Gabriels merge and the gibbon's face is superimposed over theirs.

== Remix contest ==
An online contest was held in September 2006 by Realworld Remixed in which musicians and engineers were invited to submit a remix of the song. The original tracks were made available for download, offering an opportunity to work with the raw material from a hit song. The winner was Multiman's "Simian Surprise".

== Earth Day version ==
On 22 April 2022, a previously unreleased alternate mix of "Shock the Monkey" was exclusively released for download on Bandcamp under the title "Shock the Monkey (EarthPercent x Earth Day Mix)". Put out as a tribute to Earth Day 2022, proceeds from the download were donated to the environmentalist organization EarthPercent, as part of a project where Gabriel and several other artists donated exclusive and rare material. This version reached number eight on Billboard's Rock Digital Song Sales chart.

== Track listing ==
7" and 12"
No.	Title	Length
1.	"Shock the Monkey"	3:58
2.	"Soft Dog" (instrumental)	4:10

== Personnel ==
- Peter Gabriel – lead and backing vocals, Linn LM-1 programming, Prophet-5, Fairlight CMI synthesizer and sequencing
- Larry Fast – Prophet-5
- David Rhodes – guitars
- Tony Levin – Chapman Stick
- Jerry Marotta – drums
- Peter Hammill – backing vocals

== Charts ==
Chart (1982–1983)	Peak position
Australia (Kent Music Report)	25
Canada Top Singles (RPM)	10
Italy (Musica e dischi)	2
UK Singles (Official Charts)	58
US Billboard Hot 100	29
US Mainstream Rock (Billboard)	1
US Billboard Dance/Disco	26
US Billboard Hot Black Singles	64

== Coal Chamber featuring Ozzy Osbourne version ==
"Shock the Monkey"

Single by Coal Chamber featuring Ozzy Osbourne

from the album Chamber Music
- B-side: "El Cu Cuy"
- Released: 1999
- Genre: Gothic rock; nu metal; industrial metal
- Length: 3:33 (radio edit); 3:45 (album version)
- Label: Roadrunner
- Songwriter: Peter Gabriel
- Producer: Josh Abraham

Coal Chamber singles chronology
"Not Living" (1999)	"Shock the Monkey" (1999)	"Fiend" (2002)

Ozzy Osbourne singles chronology
"Buried Alive" (1999)	"Shock the Monkey" (1999)	"N.I.B." (2000)

The nu metal band Coal Chamber recorded a cover version of "Shock the Monkey" on their second studio album Chamber Music (1999). The cover featured guest vocals by Ozzy Osbourne. The music video was directed by Dean Karr. It shows the band playing with Osbourne and features footage of a monkey.

=== Track listing ===
Maxi single
No.	Title	Length
1.	"Shock the Monkey"	3:45
2.	"Shock the Monkey" (Gorilla mix)	3:35
3.	"El Cu Cuy" (alternate mix)	4:20
4.	"Shock the Monkey" (music video)	3:33

Promo single
No.	Title	Length
1.	"Shock the Monkey" (LP version)	3:45

=== Chart positions ===
Chart (1999)	Position
US Main	26
UK	83

=== Personnel ===
Coal Chamber

- B. Dez Fafara – lead vocals
- Meegs Rascón – guitar
- Rayna Foss-Rose – bass
- Mike "Bug" Cox – drums

Additional

- Ozzy Osbourne – guest vocals
- E. Blue – keyboards, backing vocals

== See also ==
- List of number-one mainstream rock hits (United States)
