= Dark Days (Coal Chamber album) =

Studio album by Coal Chamber
- Released: May 7, 2002
- Recorded: May 29 – September 21, 2001
- Studio: Rumbo Recorders (Canoga Park, California)
- Genre: Nu metal
- Length: 41:15
- Label: Roadrunner
- Producer: Ross Hogarth

Coal Chamber chronology
Chamber Music (1999)	Dark Days (2002)	Rivals (2015)

Professional ratings
Review scores
Source	Rating
AllMusic	2/5 stars
Collector's Guide to Heavy Metal	7/10
laut.de	3/5 stars
Metal.de	7/10
Metal Storm	6.9/10
Now	1/5 stars
Rock Hard	7/10

Dark Days is the third studio album by the American nu metal band Coal Chamber. It was released on May 7, 2002.

In 2019, Joe Smith-Engelhardt of Alternative Press included the song "Fiend" in his list of "Top 10 nü-metal staples that still hold up today".

== Background and production ==
Coal Chamber began recording Dark Days with producer Ross Hogarth at Rumbo Recorders on May 29, 2001. The band finished recording bass and drum tracks by mid-June 2001, after which guitars and vocals were recorded. The album was mostly completed on September 18, 2001, with Dez Fafara going into the studio to re-record his vocals on September 21, 2001. Bassist Rayna Foss-Rose left the band after this album was recorded; she was replaced by Nadja Peulen, who had already previously replaced her for Coal Chamber's tours in 1999 during Rayna's pregnancy. This was the last studio album from Coal Chamber before they disbanded due to personal differences.

== Composition ==
Dark Days is often regarded as the band's most aggressive and heaviest album; while past Coal Chamber albums had softer songs scattered throughout them, Dark Days stays mostly aggressive all the way through. Dark Days mostly combines the styles from the band's debut album with their second album Chamber Music, mixing the nu metal elements with the gothic metal elements from Chamber Music. Dark Days received mixed reviews from music critics but was more popular with fans.

== Release and promotion ==
"Fiend" was the album's only single, releasing in March 2002. It was accompanied by a video clip directed by photographer Paul Brown. The clip found airplay on Uranium, which also featured an interview with the band and the song "Glow" was also most notably featured on the soundtrack of The Scorpion King. It is one of the band's most well known songs and is thought to be about how the band and the nu metal genre were getting heavily criticized at the time.

The album debuted and peaked at number 34 on the US Billboard 200 chart, selling more than 31,000 copies in its first week.

On their last show, guitarist Meegs Rascón accidentally hit vocalist Dez Fafara on the head with his guitar, with Dez walking off stage only to reappear claiming that this was to be Coal Chamber's last show. Dez then released Giving the Devil His Due which was a collection of unreleased tracks, remixes, and demos by Coal Chamber. Afterward, he went on to start the band DevilDriver.

The song "Something Told Me" was featured on the Resident Evil end credits as the second song.

== Track listing ==
All songs written by Mike Cox/B. Dez Fafara/Rayna Foss/Miguel Rascón except where noted.

No.	Title	Length
1.	"Fiend"	3:01
2.	"Glow"	3:12
3.	"Watershed"	2:37
4.	"Something Told Me"	3:24
5.	"Dark Days"	3:40
6.	"Alienate Me"	3:18
7.	"One Step"	2:39
8.	"Friend?"	3:34
9.	"Rowboat" (Flood cover; written by Simon Daniels, Buddy Gheen, Dave Casey, Robert Marlette)	4:49
10.	"Drove"	3:13
11.	"Empty Jar"	3:53
12.	"Beckoned"	4:03
Total length:		41:15

Limited Edition Bonus Tracks
No.	Title	Length
13.	"Anxiety"	3:15
14.	"Save Yourself"	3:27
15.	"One Step" (Scott Humphrey Mixdownload download)	2:39

== Credits ==
- Dez Fafara – lead vocals
- Miquel Rascon – guitars, backing vocals
- Rayna Foss-Rose – bass
- Mike Cox – drums

Production

- Ross Hogarth – production, engineering, mixing, mastering
- Jeremy Blair – assistant engineering

== Charts ==
Chart (2002)	Peak position
Australian Albums (ARIA Charts)	61
French Albums (SNEP)	69
German Albums (Offizielle Top 100)	61
Scottish Albums (OCC)	34
UK Albums (OCC)	43
UK Rock & Metal Albums (OCC)	4
US Billboard 200	34

"Fiend"
Chart (2002)	Peak position
US Active Rock Top 50 (Radio & Records)	49
