= Chamber Music (Coal Chamber album) =

Studio album by Coal Chamber
- Released: September 7, 1999
- Recorded: 1998–1999
- Studios: Long View Farms (North Brookfield, Massachusetts): Westlake Audio; (Los Angeles, California)
- Genres: Nu metal; gothic metal
- Length: 55:14
- Label: Roadrunner
- Producer: Josh Abraham

Coal Chamber chronology
Coal Chamber (1997)	Chamber Music (1999)	Dark Days (2002)

Singles from Chamber Music
- 1. "Shock the Monkey" Released: 1999

Professional ratings
Review scores
Source	Rating
AllMusic	4/5 stars
Collector's Guide to Heavy Metal	5/10
The Great Rock Discography	5/10
Kerrang!	3/5 stars
Rock Hard	7/10
Spin	5/10

Chamber Music is the second studio album by American nu metal band Coal Chamber, released on Roadrunner Records on September 7, 1999. The album has industrial elements, most notably on their cover of "Shock the Monkey". The shift in sound was influenced by the involvement of several keyboardists, such as Jay Gordon and Amir Derakh of Orgy, DJ Lethal of Limp Bizkit and production assistance from Dave Ogilvie of Skinny Puppy.

== Content ==
With this record, Coal Chamber purposely distanced their sound from that of Korn who they were often compared to because of the prominent influence on Coal Chamber's debut album. Many of the songs on Chamber Music are notably more melodic than that of its predecessor. Their cover of Peter Gabriel's "Shock the Monkey", featuring guest vocals by Ozzy Osbourne, helped launch the band into the mainstream music scene as well. A music video was produced for "Shock the Monkey", and the song received notable radio airplay for a time. The album debuted at number 22 on the Billboard 200 chart, selling more than 48,000 copies in its first week; it had sold over 272,000 copies in the US by March 2002.

The song "What's in Your Mind?" opens with a lengthy example of backmasking. The song "Tyler's Song" was featured on the soundtrack of the film Scream 3.

== Track listing ==
All songs written by Coal Chamber except where noted.

No.	Title	Length
1.	"Mist" (instrumental)	0:43
2.	"Tragedy"	2:51
3.	"El Cu Cuy"	4:22
4.	"Untrue"	3:26
5.	"Tyler's Song"	2:49
6.	"What's in Your Mind?"	3:55
7.	"Not Living"	3:50
8.	"Shock the Monkey" (Peter Gabriel cover feat. Ozzy Osbourne)	3:42
9.	"Burgundy"	2:11
10.	"Entwined"	3:49
11.	"Feed My Dreams"	2:55
12.	"My Mercy"	4:04
13.	"No Home"	5:09
14.	"Shari Vegas"	3:16
15.	"Notion"	3:27
16.	"Anything But You"	4:42
Total length:		55:14

Limited edition bonus tracks
No.	Title	Length
17.	"Wishes"	3:06
18.	"Apparition"	2:27

== Personnel ==
=== Coal Chamber ===
- B. Dez Fafara – lead vocals
- Meegs Rascón – guitars, backing vocals and keyboards on "Untrue"
- Rayna Foss-Rose – bass
- Mike "Bug" Cox – drums

=== Production ===
- Jay Baumgardner – mixing
- Amir Derakh – additional mixing
- David Bianco – mixing on "Tyler's Song", "What's In Your Mind?" and "Feed My Dreams"
- David "The Rave" Ogilvie – mixing on "Shock The Monkey"
- Chad Fridirici – engineering
- Brian Virtue – engineering
- Mike Parnan – additional engineering
- Troy Van Leeuwen – technical assistance
- Josh Abraham – producer

=== Guest musicians ===
- Brian Levine – strings arrangement
- Troy Van Leeuwen – keyboards
- Brian Virtue – programming
- Josh Abraham – keyboards and programming
- Ozzy Osbourne – guest vocals (on "Shock the Monkey")
- E. Blue – keyboards and guest vocals (on "Shock the Monkey" and "My Mercy")
- Anthony "Fu" Valic – additional programming (on "Shock the Monkey")
- Phil Western – additional programming (on "Shock the Monkey")
- Aimee Echo – guest vocals (on "Burgundy" and "My Mercy")
- Jay Gordon – keyboards (on "Burgundy")
- Amir Derakh – percussion synth (on "No Home"), keyboards (on "Notion"), micromoog (on "Anything But You")
- Georgie the Pug – panting (on "Shari Vegas")
- Jay Baumgardner – keyboards (on "Notion")
- DJ Lethal – freaky fractures (on "Notion")

== Chart positions ==
=== Album ===
Chart (1999)	Peak position
Australian Albums (ARIA)	29
Dutch Albums (Album Top 100)	49
Finnish Albums (Suomen virallinen lista)	18
French Albums (SNEP)	70
German Albums (Offizielle Top 100)	70
New Zealand Albums (RMNZ)	22
Scottish Albums (Official Charts)	34
UK Albums (Official Charts)	21
US Billboard 200	22
