= Loco (Coal Chamber song) =

Single by Coal Chamber

from the album Coal Chamber
- Released: June 22, 1998
- Studio: NRG (North Hollywood, California)
- Genre: Nu metal
- Length: 4:15 (album version); 3:36 (radio edit)
- Label: Roadrunner
- Songwriters: Mikey Cox; Dez Fafara; Rayna Foss; Meegs Rascón
- Producer: Jay Gordon

Coal Chamber singles chronology
"Loco" (1998)	"Shock the Monkey" (1999)

Music video
- "Loco" on YouTube

"Loco" is a song by American nu metal band Coal Chamber. The song was released as the band's debut single off their 1997 self-titled debut album. It is one of the band's best known songs.

== Music video ==
The video starts off with the ice cream truck (which is on the cover of the album Coal Chamber) rounding a turn and slowly coming to a stop with the beginning of the song playing. When Fafara says the opening line of "Pull", a crazed ice cream truck driver gets off the truck and heads into a nearby house which is home to the members of Coal Chamber. One by one, the driver hunts them down and forces them to stare into a View Master, which shows Coal Chamber performing the song. Bassist Rayna Foss is first, as the driver sneaks up on her as she is playing a game of jacks. Singer B. Dez Fafara is next, as the driver surprises him while he is sewing a stuffed animal's head back on. Guitarist Miguel "Meegs" Rascon is the next victim, caught by the driver while he is staring at an empty rocking chair. Drummer Mikey "Bug" Cox is the final victim, as the driver victimizes him while he is sitting on a mattress watching TV. At the end of the video, the driver has tied the band members to chairs in the basement of the house and has attached a View Master to each member's head with duct tape. The driver then leaves the house and drives away.

It was filmed in October 1997. The truck driver is played by Aljandro, a friend of the band who Dez Fafara described as having "real fangs, and he's into the vampire society and he's really a trip and he's an artist as well." He has been widely confused for Ozzy Osbourne. Kerrang! attributed this confusion to the "vague resembelance" between them, and the band's association with Sharon Osbourne Management at the time.

In 2018, the staff of Metal Hammer included the video in the site's list of "the 13 best nu metal videos".

== Track listing ==
No.	Title	Length
1.	"Loco (Radio Edit)"	3:36
2.	"Blisters"	4:52
3.	"Sway (Hypno-Submissive Mix)"	3:25
4.	"Loco (Album Version)"	4:15
