= Giving the Devil His Due =

Giving The Devil His Due

Compilation album by Coal Chamber
- Released: August 19, 2003
- Recorded: August 1994 – May 2003
- Genre: Nu metal, alternative metal, industrial metal, gothic metal
- Length: 69:40
- Label: Roadrunner
- Producer: Josh Abraham, Coal Chamber

Coal Chamber chronology
Giving The Devil His Due (2003)	The Best of Coal Chamber (2004)

Professional ratings
Review scores
Source	Rating
Metal Hammer	5/10

Giving the Devil His Due is a 2003 compilation album of remixes and previously unreleased songs by the American nu metal band Coal Chamber. "Blisters" and "Wishes" had been on soundtrack albums prior to this album.

== Track listing ==
All tracks are written by Coal Chamber except where listed.

No.	Title	Length
1.	"Headstones and the Walking Dead"	3:27
2.	"Big Truck" (Hand-on-Wheel Mix)	3:32
3.	"Pig" (Original Version)	3:22
4.	"Bradley" (Radio Mix)	3:04
5.	"Sway" (Hypno-Submissive Mix)	3:26
6.	"Not Living" (Original Version)	3:52
7.	"Blisters"	4:52
8.	"El Cu Cuy" (Man-to-Monster Mix)	4:19
9.	"Wishes"	3:07
10.	"Apparition"	2:28
11.	"Anxiety"	3:14
12.	"Save Yourself"	3:26
13.	"One Step" (Scott Humphrey Mix)	2:40
14.	"Big Truck" (Live)	3:24
15.	"I" (Demo)	3:39
16.	"Oddity" (Demo)	4:05
17.	"Sway" (Demo)	3:30
18.	"Unspoiled" (Demo)	3:37
19.	"Loco" (Demo)	3:38
20.	"Babbit" (Demo)	2:58

== Credits ==
- Dez Fafara - lead vocals
- Meegs Rascón - guitar
- Rayna Foss Rose - bass
- Mike Cox - drums
- John Thor - drums (on the demos)
