= Coal Chamber =

American nu metal band

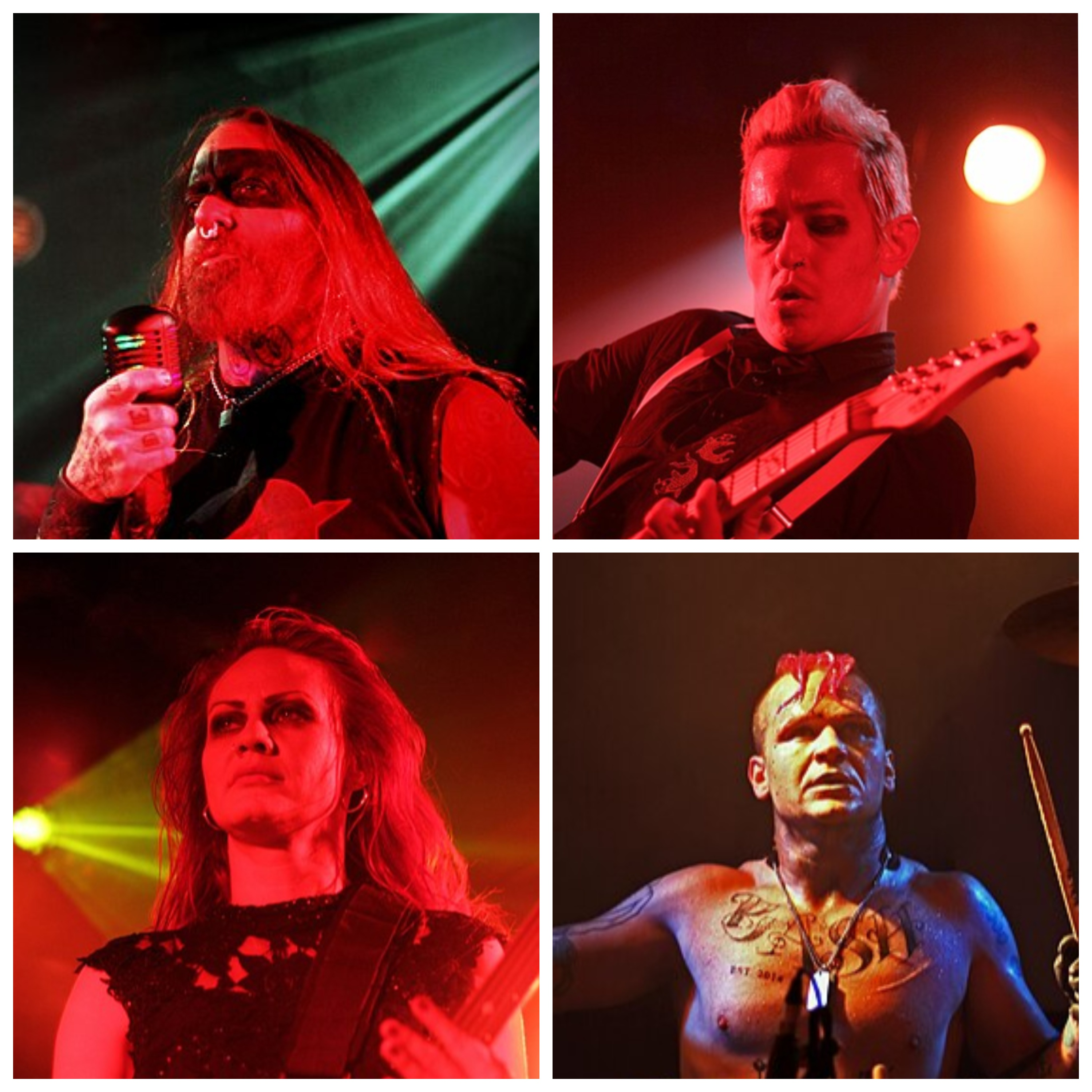
- Coal Chamber in 2015; Clockwise from top left: Fafara, Rascón, Cox, Peulen

Background information
- Also known as: She's in Pain (1992–1993)
- Origin: Los Angeles, California, U.S.
- Genres: Nu metal; alternative metal; gothic metal
- Years active: 1992–2003; 2011–2016; 2022–present
- Labels: Napalm; Roadrunner; Woah Dad!
- Members: Dez Fafara; Miguel Rascón; Mikey Cox; Nadja Peulen
- Past members: Rayna Foss; Chela Rhea Harper; John Tor
- Website: coalchamberofficial.com

Coal Chamber is an American nu metal band formed by Dez Fafara and Meegs Rascón in Los Angeles in 1992, initially under the name She's in Pain. The original lineup also consisted of bassist Rayna Foss and drummer Jon Tor. Mike Cox replaced Tor on drums in 1995, and the Coal Chamber lineup was complete. After signing to Roadrunner Records, they released their debut album, Coal Chamber, in 1997.

Chamber Music followed two years later and featured the band's only charting single in the US, a cover of Peter Gabriel's "Shock the Monkey", featuring Ozzy Osbourne as a guest vocalist. Their third album, Dark Days, was released in 2002. Nadja Peulen temporarily replaced Foss on bass for touring commitments, before joining on a permanent basis in 2002. Coal Chamber disbanded in 2003, after ten years together, and then reunited in 2011, with the lineup of Fafara, Cox, and Rascón, along with Chela Rhea Harper on bass. Peulen rejoined the band on bass in 2013, and Coal Chamber released their fourth album, Rivals, in 2015, before disbanding again in 2016. They then reunited a second time in 2022.

== History ==
=== Formation and early years (1992–1995) ===
Coal Chamber was originally formed in 1992 under the name She's in Pain by vocalist Dez Fafara and guitarist Miguel "Meegs" Rascón, based on a mutual love for the Sisters of Mercy. After a few shows, they decided to change the band's lineup, and they adopted their present name in 1993. Bassist Rayna Foss was recruited through a newspaper ad. According to Foss, the band at the time was named "Coal", while Rascón wanted to name it "Chamber", and they ended up combining the two words. The band had two drummers in the two-and-a-half years prior to their signing with a label, the longest-lasting being John Tor.

In late 1994, Dino Cazares of Fear Factory championed a demo tape by Coal Chamber, causing a huge local stir with gigs at the Roxy Theatre and Whisky a Go Go, eventually leading Roadrunner Records to offer the band a contract. Fafara dropped out quite suddenly due to disagreements with his wife about the band. In early 1995, he reunited with Coal Chamber, which ended his marriage but revitalized the band. With a renewed sense of energy, Coal Chamber was able to regain their deal with Roadrunner, which they signed in December 1995. A few weeks prior, John Tor was fired for "constantly fighting" with Rascón, per Fafara. Around the same time, they auditioned Mikey Cox and his brother Nathan, hiring the former as their new drummer.

=== Coal Chamber (1996–1998) ===
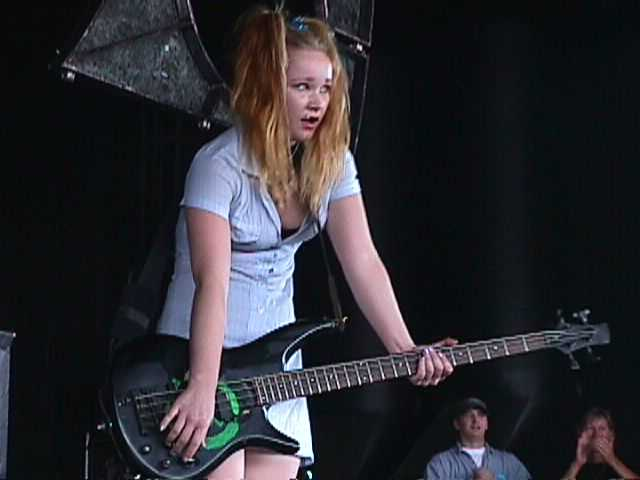
Former bassist Rayna Foss in 1998

In 1996, Coal Chamber played at the first Ozzfest. The band managed to catch the attention of Ozzy Osbourne's wife, Sharon, who became their manager. They recorded their first album, Coal Chamber, which was released on February 11, 1997. The record produced one single and a video, "Loco", directed by Nathan "Karma" Cox. The video was included as an extra after the ending credits of Dee Snider's film Strangeland. The band also recorded an exclusive song for the soundtrack, titled "Not Living". The album only sold 844 copies in its first week; at its peak, it was selling 5,000 copies per week. On December 21, 1999, it was certified Gold by the Recording Industry Association of America (RIAA), signifying over 500,000 copies sold.

In 1997, the band toured Europe with Machine Head, Napalm Death, and Skinlab, including a show at the Dynamo Festival in the Netherlands. Coal Chamber also supported Pantera on tour from September through December 1997, along with Anthrax. Also, in 1997 and 1998, the band opened for Megadeth during the Cryptic Writings tour.

=== Chamber Music (1999–2000) ===
In September 1999, Coal Chamber released its second album, Chamber Music. Prior to its publication, it was dubbed one of the most anticipated albums of the year by Alternative Press. The album saw the band experiment with their sound, placing a greater emphasis on harmonies and symphonic qualities. According to Alternative Press, the record was "one of the few instances where a band lumped into the whole nü-metal phylum sought to challenge their audience." Chamber Music sold 48,000 copies in it first week and debuted at number 22 on the Billboard 200 chart, while its lead single, a cover of Peter Gabriel's "Shock the Monkey", featuring Ozzy Osbourne, gave the band their first radio hit. Despite this, the album received mixed reviews from critics and did not sell as well as their debut, with only 272,000 copies sold by 2002. According to Cox, "A lot of our fans hated [the] album, after not getting more of the same as the first one. The second MTV played our video, that's it, they said we were sellouts." Fafara recognized that that record's direction was not well-received by the band's fanbase but did not view it as a failure due to its initial positive reception.

Coal Chamber embarked on headlining and festival tours in support of the album. That year, the band took part in Insane Clown Posse's Amazing Jeckel Brothers Tour, along with Biohazard, Krayzie Bone, Twiztid, and Mindless Self Indulgence. While Biohazard, Mindless Self Indulgence, Krayzie Bone, and Twiztid were well received by audiences, Coal Chamber was not. ICP fans were not purchasing tickets, as they did not like the band. For the three shows that Coal Chamber played, there were multiple ticket refunds. ICP member Violent J and his brother, Rob, made the decision to eliminate Coal Chamber from the tour. After doing so, there were no ticket refunds for the remaining tour dates. ICP claimed that Coal Chamber had been removed due to equipment problems but later revealed the true reason for their actions on The Howard Stern Show, on August 19, 1999. On air, Osbourne, who also appeared as a guest, informed Bruce and Utsler that Coal Chamber filed a lawsuit for breach of contract. Between August and December 1999, Nadja Peulen filled in on bass while Rayna Foss went on maternity leave. Foss returned to the band in January 2000.

On March 10, 2000, it was announced that Coal Chamber had parted ways with Sharon Osbourne Management. Rascón said that the band's relationship with Osbourne had "run its course and we needed to find another point of view". Conversely, Fafara claimed that the other members of Coal Chamber had met up in a hotel—alleging some members had been "up for four or five days straight on meth"—and fired Osbourne without consulting him. He believes that this cost the band their only "good shot in the [music] business". On March 29, 2000, the band signed with Left Bank Management. Having grown exhausted from being on the road together for five years, Coal Chamber abruptly ended touring in support of Chamber Music in July 2000 and dropped off the Tattoo the Earth tour a week before it was due to begin, ostensibly to begin work on new material. The band members did not communicate with one another for a year, until Fafara and Rascón reconnected to work on a song with Mötley Crüe bassist Nikki Sixx.

=== Dark Days and first disbandment (2001–2003) ===
Between May and September 2001, Coal Chamber recorded their third album, Dark Days, with producer Ross Hogarth. The recording sessions were marked with high drug use and tensions between Fafara and Rascón, the latter of which informed the album's tone and some of its lyrics. A week after recording concluded, Foss left the band to raise her daughter, and Peulen was brought back as her official replacement; Foss's departure was announced in January 2002.

Dark Days was issued on May 6, 2002, to mixed reviews. The album had sold 200,000 copies by December 2003. Prior to its release, Coal Chamber joined the Jägermeister tour across the United States, which commenced on March 8. On April 17, Fafara and Rascón got into an onstage altercation during a show in Lubbock, Texas. Tensions between the two were high, and they had been fighting before the show. During the first song, Rascón stabbed Fafara with the headstock of his guitar, after which they began fighting. Fafara then announced to the audience, "This is the last Coal Chamber show ever!" and stormed offstage. Coal Chamber attempted to continue the show with Rascón on vocals but soon stopped altogether after two more songs; Cox demolished his drumkit before storming offstage. Fafara and Rascón exchanged further blows after the show when the latter returned to the band's tour bus. Two days after the concert, Coal Chamber dropped off the Jägermeister tour. On May 15, 2002, the band made their debut appearance on television, performing "Fiend" on Last Call with Carson Daly. In June and July 2002, they embarked on a summer tour of the United States with American Head Charge, Lollipop Lust Kill, and Medication. For the duration of the tour, Fafara and Rascón traveled in separate tour buses.

In August 2002, Fafara formed the band Deathride, later known as DevilDriver. In September 2002, he denied that Coal Chamber was breaking up. In October 2002, Coal Chamber parted ways with their management and Cox. In May 2003, Peulen said that the band would be releasing a B-sides compilation but that there was no new drummer or album on the horizon. In July, Rascón confirmed that Coal Chamber had split up. Fafara attributed the split primarily to the band's escalating drug use (in particular with Rascón and Cox), stating that he did not want to help fund their drug habits. He also mentioned creative and business differences. A month after the band's split, a compilation album, titled Giving the Devil His Due, was released, which included several demo tracks submitted by Coal Chamber prior to their signing with Roadrunner Records in 1997, along with alternative studio recordings and remixes of various tracks from their previous albums.

=== Post-breakup (2003–2010) ===
In August 2004, Roadrunner Records released The Best of Coal Chamber. In June 2005, Fafara stated that Coal Chamber's break was permanent and they would not be reforming. He also described a reformation as "like asking someone if they would ever want to go back and repeat the third and fourth grades after they're already done with high school".

Fafara continued as vocalist of the metal band DevilDriver, recording seven albums: DevilDriver, The Fury of Our Maker's Hand, The Last Kind Words, Pray for Villains, Beast, Winter Kills, and Trust No One. He is the only member of Coal Chamber to release an album after the disbandment. Bass guitarist Nadja Puelen created the t-shirt company CruelTees. After taking two years off to recover from a car accident, drummer Mikey "Bug" Cox joined forces with his longtime friend and Orgy member Jay Gordon—and the producer of Coal Chamber's first album – to form Machine Gun Orchestra. Guitarist Meegs Rascón formed the rock band Glass Piñata, previously known as Piñata. The group released a few demos on their website, and faced several line-up changes before eventually disbanding. Following Glass Piñata, Rascón joined the Orange County rock/electro band NEO GEO in mid-2009, although he later left the band in 2010.

Fafara and Rascón settled their differences on October 24, 2008, with Rascón joining DevilDriver on stage at the Glasshouse in Pomona, California, to play "Loco".

In September 2009, it was announced that Peulen and Cox had joined forces to form an unnamed band. They were seeking a vocalist and guitarist to complete the lineup.

In September 2010, Rascón and Cox joined together in a post-punk band called We Are the Riot.

=== Reformation, Rivals, and second disbandment (2011–2017) ===
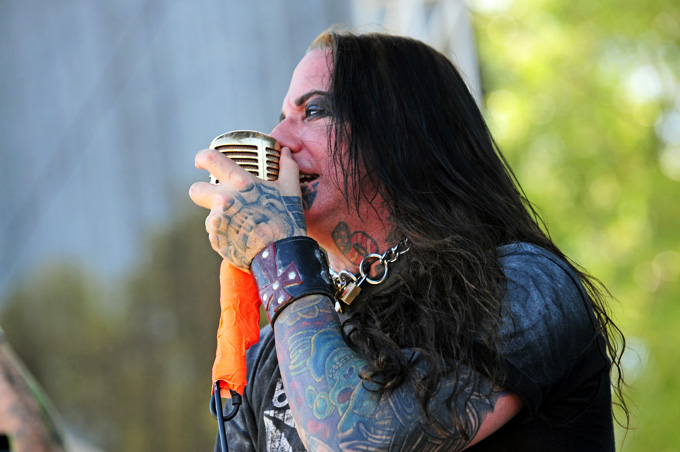
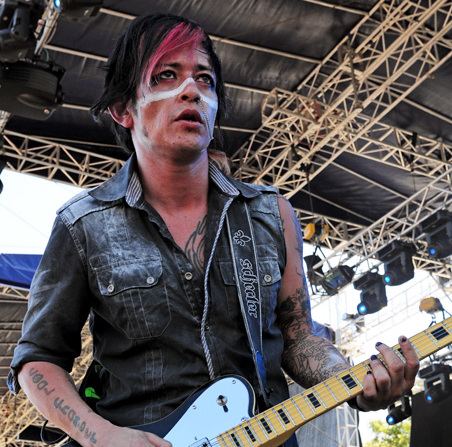
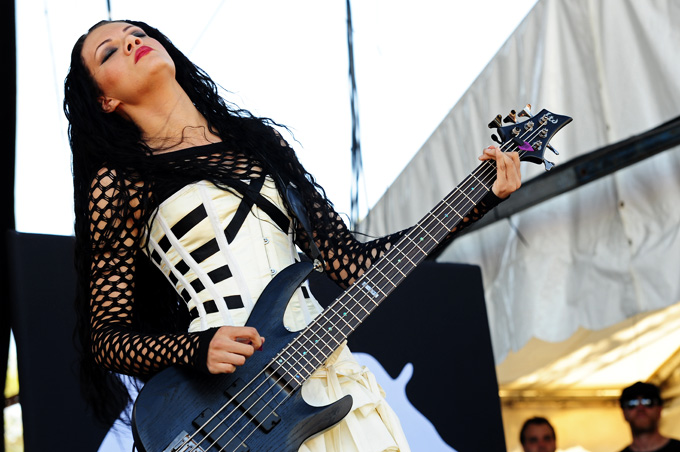
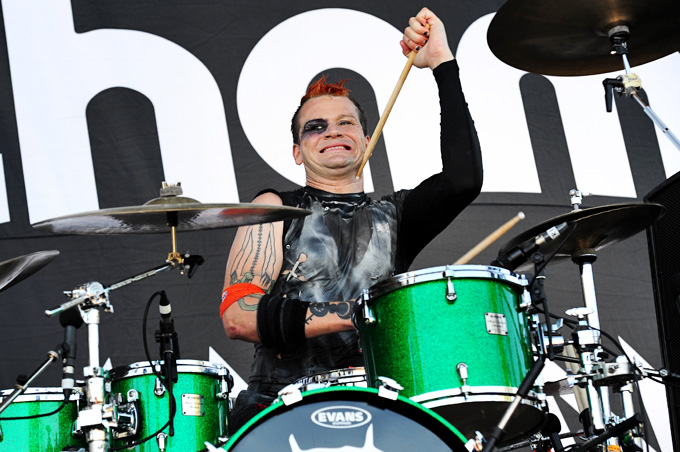
Coal Chamber in 2012

In September 2011, Fafara, Cox, and Rascón officially reformed the band with bass guitarist Chela Rhea Harper, to play the Soundwave festival in Australia. In October 2012, Fafara stated that the band were "taking it slow", partly due to his commitments with DevilDriver, but he also revealed that they had begun writing new material. The band later performed at Download 2013 and toured with Sevendust, Lacuna Coil, and Stolen Babies, with performances at Rock Am Ring, Graspop Metal Meeting in Dessel, and Nova Rock festival.

Nadja Peulen officially reunited with the band in October 2013, and they signed to Napalm Records the following year, as they continued to work on a new album. This was completed in December 2014. In February 2015, Coal Chamber revealed that the album's title was Rivals. They premiered the song "I.O.U. Nothing" online in March, and released a lyric video for "Suffer in Silence", which features Al Jourgensen, the following month. The album was released on May 19, 2015, and was their first studio album in 13 years, as well as their first to be released by Napalm Records.

In May 2016, Fafara confirmed during an interview with Blunt magazine that Coal Chamber was on indefinite hiatus, stating that due to the current success of his other band DevilDriver, Coal Chamber "has no place in my life whatsoever at this point." In June 2017, Fafara explained that he would start performing Coal Chamber songs with DevilDriver, coming to the realization that Coal Chamber would probably never tour or make music ever again. He then went on to say that the band is "done forever". In July 2018, Fafara officially announced that Coal Chamber was not coming back. In 2020, Fafara spoke about the band's status during an interview with Metal Hammer. When asked about a possible reunion, Fafara stated: "I'm not gonna say no, because we've all spoken", adding, "The main thing for me is that the relationship is all good after numerous fallouts in the beginning and after some stuff went horribly wrong when we got back together to release [2015 comeback album] Rivals. The vibe in that camp is very cool at the moment, and we all have each other's backs. I wouldn't put it past us, but right now I'm definitely concentrating on Devildriver".

=== Second reunion (2022–present) ===
Coal Chamber announced their second reunion in November 2022 as well as their scheduled appearance at the 2023 Sick New World festival in Las Vegas, Nevada. According to Fafara, a factor in the reunion was his near-death experience from a COVID-19 infection, which prompted his wife to contact the rest of the band. He later indicated the possibility of new music down the line, saying, "I realized that any problem we've ever had is gone".

The band embarked on a US tour in 2023 and a short tour of Australia in 2024. They were slated to begin touring again in 2025, but plans were postponed due to Fafara's health issues. In February 2026, the band was announced as part of the lineup for the Louder Than Life music festival in Louisville, scheduled to take place in September.

== Musical style and influences ==
Coal Chamber's music has been variously described as nu metal, alternative metal, and gothic metal. Their self-titled album falls into the first category. Elements of hip hop and heavy metal are featured throughout the album. Coal Chamber's second album, Chamber Music, is also mainly nu metal, with elements of other genres such as gothic rock, industrial, and electronic music. Rivals has groove metal influences, moving away from the goth elements of their previous two albums. Coal Chamber have also described their sound as "spookycore", a term invented by their fans. In a 2002 interview, Fafara said of the band's "spookycore" label:

The kids came up with it first because we started gettin' a lot of comparisons to Korn and stuff. Which is fine. They're a great band. But I think the kids wanted to say "No, Coal Chamber is totally different than that." So they started comin' up with "Spooky-core" and we ran with it. We were like "Yeah! That's what we are." I mean if you put it into essence, we're a dark rock-n-roll band. It's almost like sayin' the same thing. "Spooky-Core." "Dark Rock-n-Roll." You know what I mean? I started thinkin' about it like that and was like "Whoa! These kids know what they're doin'." If someone's gonna coin it [your music], who better than the fans?

The band's influences include Bad Brains, Bauhaus, Black Sabbath, Blondie, the Cure, Dead or Alive, Duran Duran, Helmet, Jane's Addiction, Kiss, Metallica, Mötley Crüe, the Sisters of Mercy, Slayer, Tori Amos, and White Zombie.

== Legacy ==
Coal Chamber is considered to be one of the bands that popularized and defined the nu metal sound. Alternative Press wrote that "Nü metal would never have left the starting gates if it weren't for the achievements of Coal Chamber [...] 'Loco' and 'Fiend' paved the way for the darker side of nü metal to step into the limelight beyond the lifespan of Coal Chamber themselves." Revolver credited the band for introducing gothic and industrial influences into the look of nu metal, which Kittie and Dope would later adopt. Likewise, Kerrang! said that the band "pre-empted the arrival of outfits like Slipknot, marrying feelings of personal anguish to slab-heavy catharsis, then filtering the lot through an absurdist nightmare lens." The band's 1997 debut is generally regarded as one of the greatest albums of the nu metal genre, being featured in lists by Kerrang!, Metal Hammer, LA Weekly, Loudwire, and Revolver.

At the same time, Coal Chamber have been criticized for their image and similarities to Korn, with the latter stemming largely from their debut album. The Houston Press noted in 2000 that although both Korn and Coal Chamber rose out of the same scene, and as such, shared the same audiences and sound, the latter was perceived as being derivative of Korn, since the former group had achieved success first. By 1999, the band was considered "a pariah of the metal community", according to CMJ New Music Monthly. In 2009, Dayal Patterson of The Quietus called Coal Chamber "something of an icon for nu metal's limitations", while describing their legacy as "a collection of one-idea songs and a portfolio of truly laughable photos." In their book A History of Heavy Metal (2017), Andrew O'Neill dismissed Coal Chamber as "a distinctly forgettable, cartoonish band, taking all the childish aspects of Korn and throwing away the real emotion and aggression." Roadrunner A&R head Monte Conner said that although the band received "some grief" due to their similarities to Korn, he believed they were "the first to follow [them]—I would say that Coal Chamber's first record was the second nu metal record ever to come out."

== Band members ==
=== Current ===
- Dez Fafara – lead vocals (1992–2003, 2011–2016, 2022–present)
- Miguel "Meegs" Rascón – guitars, keyboards, backing vocals (1992–2003, 2011–2016, 2022–present)
- Mike "Bug" Cox – drums (1995–2002, 2011–2016, 2022–present)
- Nadja Peulen – bass (1999, 2001–2003, 2013–2016, 2022–present)

=== Past ===
- Rayna Foss – bass (1993–1999, 2000–2001)
- John Tor – drums (1993–1995)
- Chela Rhea Harper – bass (2011–2013)

== Discography ==
Coal Chamber discography
- Studio albums: 4
- Compilation albums: 3
- Singles: 9
- Music videos: 5

=== Studio albums ===
Title	Album details	Peak chart positions									Sales	Certifications
Title	Album details	US	US Heat.	AUS	FIN	FRA	GER	NLD	NZ	UK	Sales	Certifications
Coal Chamber	Released: February 11, 1997; Label: Roadrunner	—	10	—	—	—	—	—	—	76	US: 448,000	RIAA: Gold
Chamber Music	Released: September 7, 1999; Label: Roadrunner	22	—	29	18	70	70	49	22	21	US: 272,000	
Dark Days	Released: May 7, 2002; Label: Roadrunner	34	—	61	—	69	61	—	—	43	US: 200,000	
Rivals	Released: May 19, 2015; Label: Napalm	82	—	—	—	—	—	—	—	—		
"—" denotes a release that did not chart.

=== Compilation albums ===
Title	Date	Label
Giving the Devil His Due	August 19, 2003	Roadrunner
The Best of Coal Chamber	August 9, 2004	Roadrunner
The Complete Roadrunner Collection (1997–2003)	March 12, 2013	Roadrunner
Loco	July 2023	Woah Dad!

=== Singles ===
Year	Title	Peak chart positions		Album
Year	Title	US Main.	UK	Album
1997	"Loco"	—	80	Coal Chamber
1997	"Big Truck"	—	—	Coal Chamber
1998	"Sway"	—	—	Coal Chamber
1999	"Not Living"	—	—	Chamber Music
1999	"Shock the Monkey" (featuring Ozzy Osbourne)	26	83	Chamber Music
1999	"Tyler's Song"	—	—	Chamber Music
1999	"Notion"	—	—	Chamber Music
2002	"Fiend"	—	—	Dark Days
2015	"I.O.U. Nothing"	—	—	Rivals
"—" denotes a release that did not chart.

=== Music videos ===
Year	Song	Director(s)
1997	"Loco"	Nathan Cox
1999	"Shock the Monkey" (featuring Ozzy Osbourne)	Dean Karr
2002	"Fiend"	P. R. Brown
2015	"I.O.U. Nothing"	
2015	"Rivals"	
