= List of Wagon Train episodes =

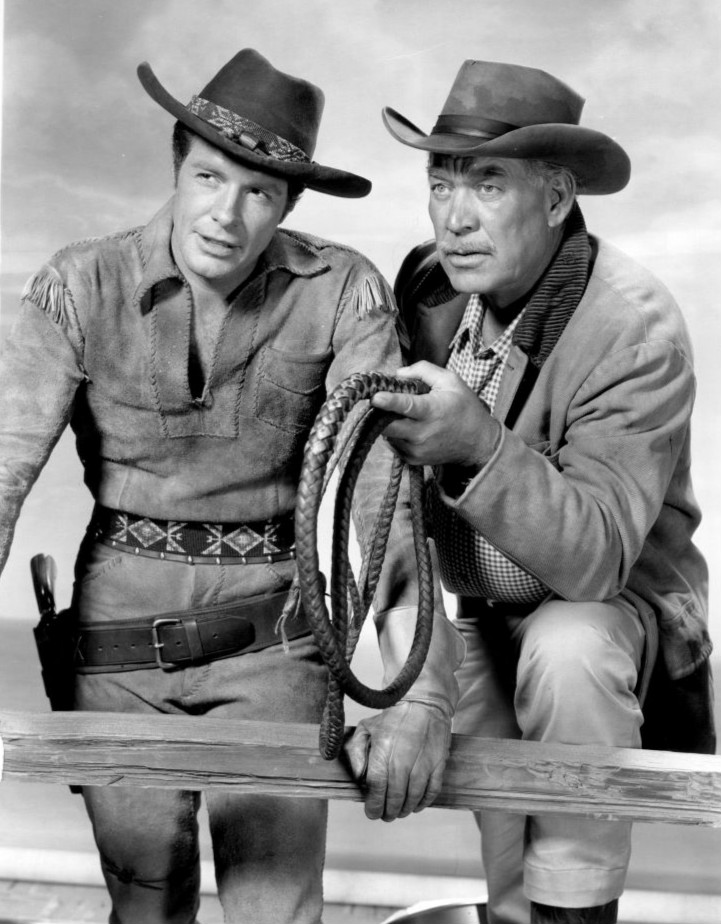
(L-R) Robert Horton and Ward Bond

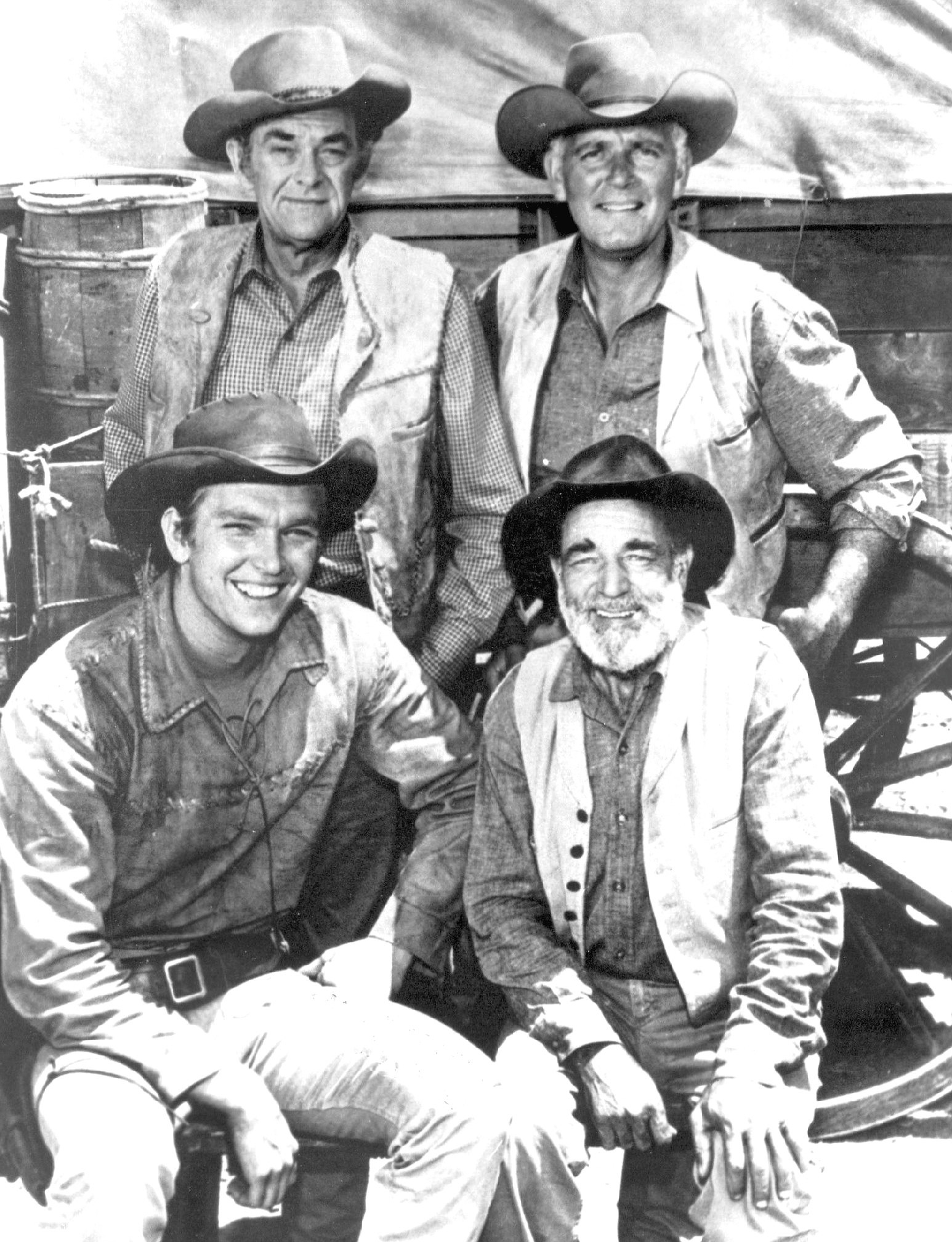
1962 cast. Top: John McIntire, Terry Wilson. Bottom: Scott Miller, Frank McGrath.

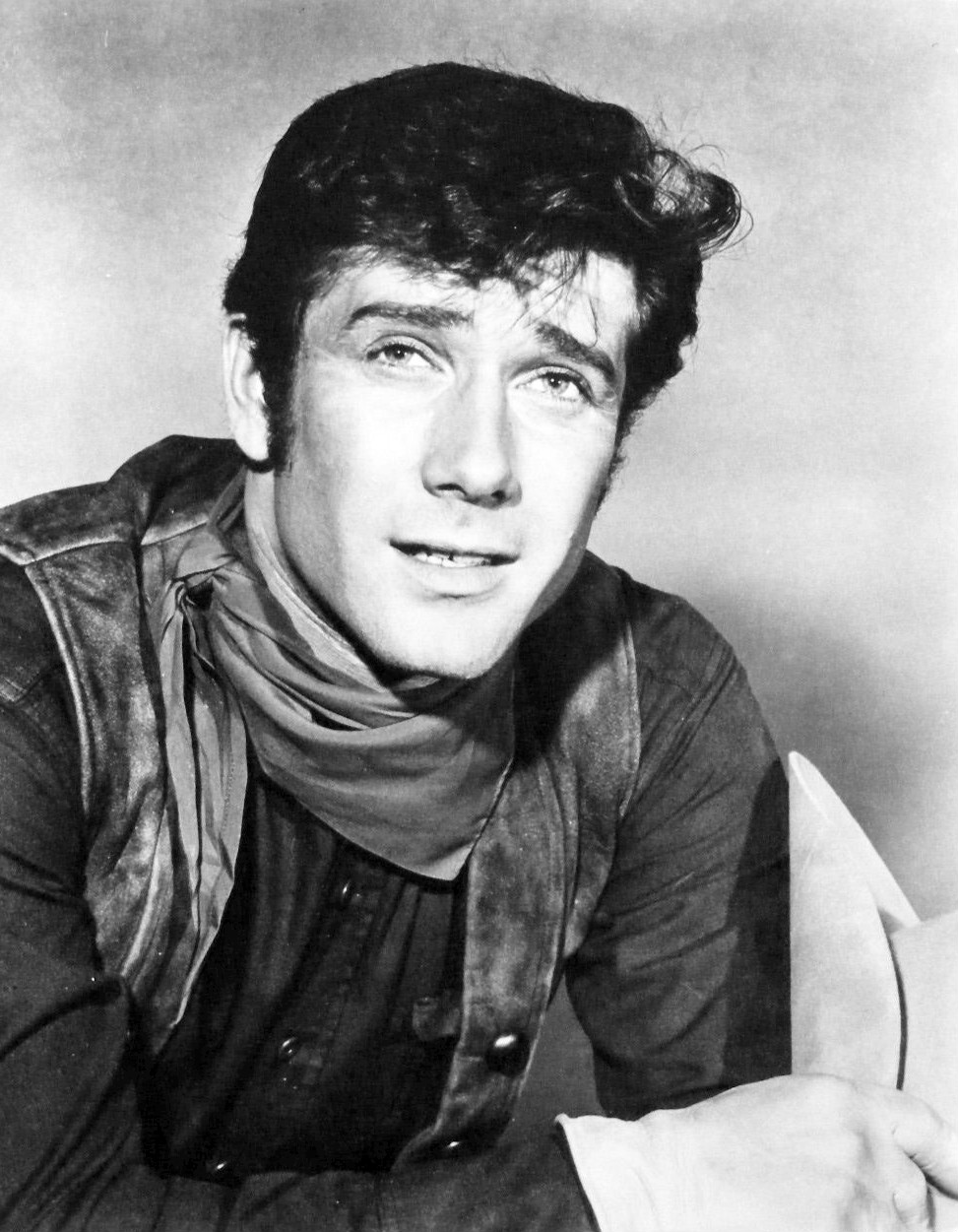
Robert Fuller

Wagon Train is an American Western television series produced by Revue Studios. The series was inspired by the 1950 John Ford film Wagon Master. It ran for eight seasons, with the first episode airing in the United States on September 18, 1957 and the final episode on May 2, 1965. Its first five seasons were broadcast on the NBC network and the remaining three on ABC.

Originally an hour-long program filmed in black and white, Wagon Train expanded to 90-minute color episodes in its seventh season, but returned to hour-long black and white for its eighth year. During its run, 284 episodes were broadcast, of which 252 were an hour in length and 32 were 90 minutes. Wagon Train was an immensely popular program during its original run. In the autumn of 1959, two years after its inception, it ranked as one of seven Westerns in the Nielsen top 10 in the United States. In the 1961–62 season, it surpassed Gunsmoke in popularity and ranked as the most popular program on American television.

Wagon Train revolved around the characters traveling to California from St. Joseph, Missouri, by a caravan of covered wagons. In its first three seasons and part of the fourth, the regular cast consisted of Ward Bond as Major Seth Adams, the trailmaster; Robert Horton as Flint McCullough, the scout; Terry Wilson as Bill Hawks, the ramrod; and Frank McGrath as Charlie Wooster, the cook. Ward Bond died of a heart attack on November 5, 1960, with the last seven episodes in which he appeared broadcast posthumously. An assistant scout, Duke Shannon, played by Scott Miller, was introduced two months later, in January 1961, and after another two months, a new trailmaster, Christopher Hale, played by John McIntire, took over the running of the wagon train in March 1961, replacing Major Adams.

At the end of the fifth season, in June 1962, Robert Horton left the series to pursue a career in musical theatre. In June 1963, the final episode of the sixth season introduced Michael Burns as teenager Barnaby West, who became a recurring character. The seventh season introduced Robert Fuller as the new scout, Cooper Smith, joining Duke Shannon and ultimately becoming the wagon train's sole scout when Scott Miller left the series in April 1964, with the last episode of the 90-minute seventh season. McIntire, Fuller, Wilson, McGrath, and Burns carried the show through its eighth and final year.

== Season overview ==
Season	Episodes	Originally released			Rank	Rating
Season	Episodes	First released	Last released	Network	Rank	Rating
1	39	September 18, 1957	June 25, 1958	NBC	23	27.7
2	38	October 1, 1958	June 24, 1959	NBC	2	36.1
3	37	September 30, 1959	June 22, 1960	NBC	2	38.4
4	38	September 28, 1960	June 21, 1961	NBC	2	34.2
5	37	September 7, 1961	June 13, 1962	NBC	1	32.1
6	37	September 19, 1962	June 5, 1963	ABC	25	22.0
7	32	September 16, 1963	April 27, 1964	ABC	N/A	N/A
8	26	September 20, 1964	May 2, 1965	ABC	N/A	N/A

Cast
Character	Played by	Season							
Character	Played by	1	2	3	4	5	6	7	8
Major Seth Adams	Ward Bond	Main	Main	Main	Main				
Christopher Hale	John McIntire					Main	Main	Main	Main
Flint McCullough	Robert Horton	Main	Main	Main	Main	Main			
Cooper Smith	Robert Fuller							Main	Main
Bill Hawks	Terry Wilson	Main	Main	Main	Main	Main	Main	Main	Main
Charlie Wooster	Frank McGrath	Main	Main	Main	Main	Main	Main	Main	Main
Duke Shannon	Scott Miller					Main	Main	Main	
Barnaby West	Michael Burns							Main	Main

== Episodes ==
Titles, credits, and air dates are taken from Wagon Train — The Television Series by James Rosin

=== Season 1 (1957–58) ===
No. overall	No. in season	Title	Directed by	Written by	Original release date
1	1	"The Willy Moran Story"	Herschel Daugherty	William Fay and William R. Cox	September 18, 1957
Special guest star Ernest Borgnine as Willy Moran, with Marjorie Lord, Andrew Duggan, Beverly Washburn, Donald Randolph, Richard Hale. John Harmon, Michael Winkelman, Kevin Hagen, Frank McGrath, Joseph McGuinn, Richard Devon. Uncredited: Terry Wilson, Carol Henry. Narration by Ward Bond: "Okaya, Kansas — last important stop for the wagon train before we reach Fort Kearny. My name is Seth Adams, wagonmaster. My scout Flint McCullough and I were ready to roll."
2	2	"The Jean Lebec Story"	Sidney Lanfield	Dwight Newton and Boris Ingster	September 25, 1957
Special guest star Ricardo Montalbán (credited as Ricardo Montalban) as Jean Lebec, with Joanne Moore, Grant Withers, William Phipps, Terry Wilson, Phil Chambers, Dick Rich, Hannes Lutz, Robert Osterloh James Griffith, Stuart Randall, David Hoffman, Clegg Hoyt, Ruby Goodwin, William Challee, Frank McGrath Uncredited: Charles Sullivan, Carol Henry Prologue narration by Robert Horton: "This was St. Joseph, Missouri — jump-off point for the wagon trains heading west across the Overland Trail. Like all the outfitting towns along the river, she was really booming. My name is Flint McCullough — I scout for the Adams outfit and I was a couple of days late getting in to Saint Joe. She'd sure grown since I saw her last. I found out from one of the members of the train where they'd set up the camp."
3	3	"The John Cameron Story"	George Waggner	E. Jack Neuman	October 2, 1957
Also starring Carolyn Jones Special guest star Michael Rennie as John Cameron, with Claude Akins, Jack Elam, Francis J. McDonald, William Boyett, Ronald Foster, Ted Mapes, Frank McGrath, Henry Wills Uncredited: Dorothy Vernon. Prologue narration by Robert Horton: "The train was half-way across the state of Nebraska. The rains had been heavy and the rivers were sometimes close to flood stage but... our luck held. The spirits were high, though sometimes we had to take baths when we didn't want them. Major Adams, the wagonmaster, had a lot of faith in his people. It went both ways, which meant everyone worked... together. Then came an early frost, snow, and early spring — even the Major couldn't have figured on that. Then, just as suddenly, the weather cleared. Well, my name is Flint McCullough. I scout for the train. In my book, things were going... well — too well. So well, in fact, that we almost forgot that trouble could be tucked behind any rock."
4	4	"The Ruth Owens Story"	Robert Florey	Robert E. Thompson	October 9, 1957
Special guest star Shelley Winters as Ruth Owens, with Kent Smith, Dean Stockwell Russell Simpson, Wendy Winkleman, Malcolm Atterbury, Ralph Moody, Hope Summers, Ann Morrison, Charles Seel, Ross Elliott. Harry Tyler, Emerson Treacy, Terry Wilson, James Brandt, Tom Brandt, Frank McGrath, K. L. Smith, Minerva Urecal, Elizabeth Harrower Narration by Ward Bond: "Half-way across Kansas — the drought hit us. Twenty-two days without a drop of rain. I've rationed water, but soon there won't be enough to even boil food. My name is Major Seth Adams, US Army, retired. As wagonmaster, it's my job to keep the train rolling. My sidekick Flint McCullough is a fine Indian scout, but even he can't find water where there ain't any."
5	5	"The Les Rand Story"	Robert Florey	Berne Giler	October 16, 1957
Special guest star Sterling Hayden as Les Rand, with Sallie Brophy, Eduard Franz Eugene Martin, Ray Teal, Linda Watkins, John Dierkes, Frank McGrath, Russ Thorson, Ted Mapes, James Philbrook, Shooting Star Narration by Robert Horton: "We'd pushed across the Missouri border into the state of Kansas. Well, my name is Flint McCullough. I scout for the wagon train headed by Major Adams. We'd been going through a heavily wooded area, so it was good to see some daylight. The Major and I were riding out front when word came that someone was hurt way back on the wagon train, but it wasn't until we got back to the scene of the accident that we learned that the man who was hurt was Chuck Wooster — the Major's cook and driver and... well, one of our best friends."
6	6	"The Nels Stack Story"	Don Weis	Story by : Lester Dent; Teleplay by : John Dunkel	October 23, 1957
Special guest star Mark Stevens as Nels Stack Also starring Joanne Dru, with Kevin Hagen, Frank McGrath, John Day, Terry Wilson, Irene Corlett, Tom Selden, Charles Stevens, Dale Van Sickle, Bill Rae Uncredited: Carol Henry Prologue narration by Ward Bond: "As wagonmaster, I kept the train rollin' at a steady pace the last few days. I'd heard rumors of Indian trouble. I tried to keep it from the members of the train, but when we learned that there was an Indian battle goin' on up to the north of us, word spread fast. Flint McCullough, our scout, Nelson Stack, a former army colonel, and myself rode on ahead."
7	7	"The Emily Rossiter Story"	Sidney Lanfield	Story by : Boris Ingster; Teleplay by : Louis Peterson and Richard Collins	October 30, 1957
Special guest star Mercedes McCambridge as Emily Rossiter, with Susan Oliver, John Dehner Frank McGrath [credited, but does not appear], Terry Wilson, Frank DeKova, William Phipps, Robert McQueeney, Irene Corlett
8	8	"The John Darro Story"	Mark Stevens	Adrian Spies	November 6, 1957
Special guest star Eddie Albert as John Darro, with Margo, Edgar Buchanan Kim Charney, Don Durant, Terry Wilson, Malcolm Atterbury, Frank McGrath, Irene Corlett, Norman Leavitt, Ellen Hardies Text in end credits: "The Ballad of Yellow John Thurmond" Composed and Sung by Don Durant.
9	9	"The Charles Avery Story"	Bernard Girard	Aaron Spelling	November 13, 1957
Special guest star Farley Granger as Charles Avery, with Susan Kohner Chuck Connors, Bing Russell, Mac Williams, Henry Brandon, Nico Minardos. Abel Fernandez, Eddie Little, Ted Mapes, Frank McGrath, David Armstrong, Fredrick Ledebur Uncredited: Carol Henry Narration by Robert Horton: "We've been on our way across the Nebraska Territory for several weeks and we still had some to go before we hit The Dakotas. It hadn't seemed likely that we'd meet up with Indians this far east, but as a wagon train scout, I'd leaned that you never know when or where trouble's liable to hit."
10	10	"The Mary Halstead Story"	Justus Addiss	Story by : Leo Lieberman; Teleplay by : Robert Thompson and Leo Lieberman	November 20, 1957
Mary Halstead is in search of a son she gave up a long time ago. With months to live, she comes west on the trail of someone who could be her son, but he may also turn out to be a notorious outlaw. Special guest star Agnes Moorehead as Mary Halstead, with Tom Pittman, Vaughn Taylor, Tom Laughlin, Walter Coy, Gregg Palmer, Jack Lambert, Robert Patten Paul Sorenson, Frederick Ford, Terry Wilson, Frank McGrath, Craig Duncan, Ruth Lee, Fred Coby Uncredited: Ted Mapes
11	11	"The Zeke Thomas Story"	John Brahm	Story by : Halsted Welles; Teleplay by : Halsted Welles	November 27, 1957
Special guest star Gary Merrill as Zeke Thomas accompanies Flint McCullough into a newly-built town to ask for water. The residents will only sell them water, not give it free. Much to Zeke's surprise, his finds his first wife Violet (K. T. Stevens) still alive. He had believed she died years before, he had since remarried to Maggie (Janice Rule). Also starring, Harold Stone Denver Pyle, Terry Wilson, Frank McGrath, Francis Morris, Kathleen O'Malley, Donald Towers, Jack Henderson, Mike Steen Uncredited: Hal Needham Prologue narration by Robert Horton: "When you're scoutin' for a wagon train, two things are always a worry — Indians and no water. Indians can kill you one way, but no water can kill you worse."
12	12	"The Riley Gratton Story"	John Brahm	Story by : Dwight Newton; Teleplay by : William Fay	December 4, 1957
Special guest star Guy Madison as Riley Gratton; Karen Steele, Jean Carson, James Westerfield, Gregory Walcott, Gregg Palmer, Malcolm Atterbury, Sammy Ogg, Frank McGrath Raymond Guth, Terry Wilson, Juney Ellis, Dirk Evans, Larry Blake, Jim Hayward, Ken Lynch Uncredited: Carol Henry Narration by Ward Bond: "Any time you'd like to know about Nebraska, you just git in touch with me — Seth Adams, major, US Army, retired and... wagonmaster. I guess I'd swallowed enough Nebraska mud and dust to remember the bitter taste of it for the rest of my life. Yes sir, it takes quite a spell for a big wagon train like mine to get across this piece of real estate. And for every mile the wagons made, I rode at least ten. I can tell you right now that there's more saddle sores than there are dollars in a job like mine."
13	13	"The Clara Beauchamp Story"	Earl Bellamy	Story by : William Leicester; Teleplay by : Winston Miller	December 11, 1957
When a new officer and troops kill an Indian brave and the post commander's drunken bored wife insults the Chief, Flint is forced to act as a neutral agent between the Army and Indians and save the wagon train. Richard Garland, Mike Ragan, Will J. White, Terry Wilson, Frank McGrath, Robert Swan Irene Windust, Ellen Hardies, Robert Roark, John Merrick, Robert Riordan Uncredited: Carol Henry
14	14	"The Julie Gage Story"	Sidney Lanfield	Story by : Kermit Shelby; Teleplay by : Aaron Spelling	December 18, 1957
A head strong Julie Gage (Anne Jeffreys) is determined to ride her wagon to California. Losing her father to fever, many suitors step up to help but she'll have none of it until Tobe Cannon (Robert Sterling) comes down with fever himself and she's the only one who will tend to him. Special guest stars: Jimmy Komack, Don Megowan, Esther Dale, Malcolm Atterbury Ellen Hardies, Terry Wilson, Frank McGrath, Irene Windust, Ronald Foster.
15	15	"The Cliff Grundy Story"	George Waggner	Aaron Spelling	December 25, 1957
Mortally wounded in a buffalo stampede, Cliff Grundy's friend Flint stays when the wagon train leaves. Manson says he will help but his reasons for staying become clear as Cliff keeps saying he has a goldmine somewhere and he's recovering. Special guest star Dan Duryea as Cliff Grundy, with Russell Johnson as Craig Manson, Don Durant as Lucas, Frank McGrath as Charlie Wooster, Terry Wilson as Bill Hawks, Harry Harvey Jr. as Millard, Fred Graham as the Bartender
16	16	"The Luke O'Malley Story"	Mark Stevens	William Fay	January 1, 1958
Luke O'Malley is running from an outlaw who said he would kill him for turning him into the law. Since he won't believe he didn't do it, he takes his two kids and joins Adams' wagon train disguised as a parsons, who doesn't act like one. Special guest star Keenan Wynn as Luke O'Malley Also starring Mary Murphy, with Carlos Romero, Reba Waters, Frank McGrath, Terry Wilson, Gordon Wynn, Charlie Murray, James Maloney. Ernest Sarracino, David McMahon, Hope Summers, Tiger Fafara, Andy Oropeza, Richard Bermudez, Jeanne Robbins.
17	17	"The Jesse Cowan Story"	Sidney Lanfield	Dwight Newton	January 8, 1958
The Cowans and Beals have been feuding a long time. Bob and Jesse return from the war and find their family dead and the Beals have joined a wagon train. Revenging their family is just the start of what Major Adams must now deal with Special guest star George Montgomery as Jesse Cowan, with Penny Edwards, Mort Mills, Lee Van Cleef, Olive Carey, James Burke, Frank McGrath. Terry Wilson, Malcolm Atterbury, Clarence Straight, Norman Leavitt, Jeanne Bates.
18	18	"The Gabe Carswell Story"	Earl Bellamy	John Dunkel	January 15, 1958
Special guest star James Whitmore as Gabe Carswell Also starring Scott Marlowe, with Thomas B. Henry, Norman Willis, Sondra Rodgers, Frank McGrath. Terry Wilson, Voorhies J. Ardoin, Tharon Crigler, Frank de Kova. Narration by Robert Horton: "It was late one afternoon... almost camping time when I saw the smoke of their fires. I thought they were just two ordinary Sioux or Crow out hunting... and then I recognized one of them — Gabe Carswell — a man who was almost a legend on the frontier — trapper, frontiersman... and for thirty years an adopted Arapaho Indian."
19	19	"The Honorable Don Charlie Story"	David Butler	Story by : Dwight Newton; Teleplay by : Leo Townsend	January 22, 1958
Don Charlie is a gambler and womanizer and makes no excuses for it. When he meets a woman who wants to marry him there may be trouble because the Major promised her uncle that she would make it safely to San Francisco. Special guest star Cesar Romero as Honorable Don Charlie Also starring Virginia Grey, Diane Brewster, with Lela Bliss, Hal Baylor, Ray Kellogg, Ken Christy, Jack Lomas, Terry Wilson, Frank McGrath.
20	20	"The Dora Gray Story"	Arnold Laven	E. Jack Neuman	January 29, 1958
Dora Gray has made some poor choices in her life. Just wanting to get to San Francisco, her latest one involves someone who sells army guns to the Indians and Flint finds himself right in the middle of it. Special guest star Linda Darnell as Dora Gray, with John Carradine, Michael Connors, Dan Blocker, Tyler McVey, Richard James. Terry Wilson, Frank McGrath, Sandy Sanders, Craig Duncan, Milan Smith, X. Brand.
21	21	"The Annie MacGregor Story"	Mark Stevens	Arnold Laven	February 5, 1958
The MacGregor clan decides to come to America and start a new life. The wagon trains going to California have had a hard time dealing with their different customs. Can Major Adams' be any different? Guest actors: Jeannie Carson as Annie MacGregor, Tudor Owen
22	22	"The Bill Tawnee Story"	David Butler	Hendrik Vollaerts, Dwight Newton	February 12, 1958
Bill Tawnee served his country heroically. When Major Adams recognizes him on the trail and sees he is unable to wake, he asks his wife to join his wagon train even though there is plenty of anti-Indian sentiment afloat. Guest actors: Macdonald Carey as Bill Tawnee, Joy Page
23	23	"The Mark Hanford Story"	Jerry Hopper	Emmett Roberts, Turnley Walker	February 26, 1958
Jack Hanford built his wealth to give his son Mark, but Mark turns it all down to honor his Cheyenne heritage when his mother dies. To make matters worse in his son's eyes, he had sent for a woman he briefly met to replace her even before she died. Guest actors: Tom Tryon as Mark Hanford, Steven Ritch, Onslow Stevens, Charles Stevens
24	24	"The Bernal Sierra Story"	David Butler	Richard Maibaum, Gilbert Roland	March 12, 1958
Revolutionary Bernal Sierra joins the train finding the wife of his dead friend married to Casey Reardon who sold guns to the Mexican revolutionaries. Bernal is suspicious of Casey, his brothers, and Perdita over missing gold. Guest actor: Gilbert Roland as Bernal Sierra
25	25	"The Marie Dupree Story"	Richard Bartlett	Harry Brown	March 19, 1958
A beautiful woman riding with the train likes flirting. When she gets mixed up with the wrong man, she strings along a boy on the train in order to make him jealous, playing one man's love against another's. Guest actors: Debra Paget as Marie Dupree, Nick Adams, Sam McDaniel
26	26	"A Man Called Horse"	Sidney Lanfield	Dorothy M. Johnson, Leo Townsend	March 26, 1958
Ralph Meeker plays an unnamed and unknown law clerk in Boston. Orphaned at an early age, he knows nothing of his family background, and is subsequently rejected by Boston society. Heading west for a new life, he is captured by a Crow Indian tribe, and is eventually named Horse. Marrying into the Crow tribe, he hopes to bring his bride back to Boston. She dies in childbirth. His Crow Indian mother-in-law is the only family he has ever known. They are both rescued by the wagon train.
27	27	"The Sarah Drummond Story"	Richard Bartlett	Richard Bartlett, Lester Wm. Berke, Norman Jolley	April 2, 1958
During a storm, Flint takes shelter at a farmhouse. He soon discovers the husband is refusing his wife the care of a midwife and before it's too late for her he needs to find out why. Guest actors: June Lockhart, William Talman
28	28	"The Sally Potter Story"	David Butler	Doris Hursley, Frank Hursley	April 9, 1958
Sally Potter (Vanessa Brown) hitches a ride on the wagon train but being pretty helps and hurts her. Someone she knew catches up to the train and wants to remind her of who she is and where she came from, possibly ruining what she wants for her future. Guest actors: Martin Milner, Johnny Crawford, Jocelyn Brando
29	29	"The Daniel Barrister Story"	Richard Bartlett	Norman Jolley	April 16, 1958
Faith is tested when Jenny Barrister (Peg Hillias) is injured, and her husband Daniel (Charles Bickford) refuses medical aid. Their daughter had earlier died on the trip due to refusal of medicine. When Flint rides to the nearest town, local doctor Dr. Peter H. Culver (Roger Smith) is there dealing with a smallpox epidemic.
30	30	"The Major Adams Story"	Mark Stevens	Frank W. Marshall	April 23, 1958
31	31	"The Major Adams Story"	Mark Stevens	Frank W. Marshall	April 30, 1958
During the Civil War Charlie Wooster joins Bill Hawks under the command of Major Seth Adams. When Adams is seriously wounded saving Hawks's life he must struggle to survive, while dreaming of the girl he left behind. Guest actors: Virginia Grey, Douglas Kennedy
32	32	"The Charles Maury Story"	Allen H. Miner	Robert Yale Libott	May 7, 1958
Disguised as Yank soldiers, a band of confederate marauders blend into the wagon train, planning on robbing everyone. They are at first stopped but a member of the train helps the man in charge when she discovers the truth to his identity. Guest actors: Charles Drake, Wanda Hendrix
33	33	"The Dan Hogan Story"	Richard Bartlett	William Fay	May 14, 1958
In a growing town, Seth meets a friend from his distant past. He remembers how they met and the circumstances bringing them west. When his friend's home is threatened, not ever wearing a gun surprisingly helps him rather than the reverse. Guest actors: Jock Mahoney, Judith Ames, John Larch, Simon Scott, Buddy Baer
34	34	"The Ruttledge Munroe Story"	Richard Bartlett	Norman Jolley	May 21, 1958
Ruttledge Munroe (John Drew Barrymore) joins the wagon train on the trail. It's noticed right off his odd sense of humor but when he saves the major's life, it is forgotten until he kills someone else and the real reason he joined up is revealed. Guest actors: Mala Powers as Ruth Hadley
35	35	"The Rex Montana Story"	Jesse Hibbs	Warren Wilson	May 28, 1958
On one final push to the west, a wild west showman runs into some old friends. Some that were part of a massacre that almost cost them their lives and one man his sanity. Guest actors: Forrest Tucker, James Dunn, Maggie Mahoney, Myron Healey
36	36	"The Cassie Tanner Story"	Mark Stevens	Paul Savage	June 4, 1958
Trail hardened Cassie Tanner (Marjorie Main) joins the train, and sets her eye on Major Adams. The train desperately needs horses, and she may be the only one who can make the dangerous journey to buy them. Guest actors: George Chandler and Harry Hines
37	37	"The John Wilbot Story"	Mark Stevens	Richard Maibaum	June 11, 1958
Tensions are running high in the train between northerners and southerners traveling west. As trouble escalates one passenger with a noticeable limp, John Wilbot, is accused of being John Wilkes Booth, who many believe is still alive. Guest actors: Dane Clark, Robert Vaughn, Audrey Dalton
38	38	"The Monty Britton Story"	Mark Stevens	Thomas Thompson	June 18, 1958
Low on water, Flint scouts for more. When three water holes are dry or poisoned, Fort Paiute seems their only hope but he has to make it back to the wagon train on foot and the only other man who knows the way is believed to be a deserter. Guest actors: Ray Danton, Mona Freeman, John Hoyt
39	39	"The Sacramento Story"	Richard Bartlett	Thomas Thompson	June 25, 1958
At the end of a long journey, lives were lost. Some made it with their dreams intact. Flint tries to help two of the passengers with theirs and almost bites off too much. Politics are involved as well as unsolicited trips to the Far East. Guest actors: Dan Duryea, Linda Darnell, Marjorie Main, George Chandler, Margaret O'Brien, Reed Hadley

=== Season 2 (1958–59) ===
.

No. overall	No. in season	Title	Directed by	Written by	Original release date
40	1	"Around the Horn"	Herschel Daugherty	Ted Sherdeman	October 1, 1958
Planning to sail to Boston, the Major, Hawks and Charlie are instead shanghaied to New Orleans where they meet a Captain who has different ideas on raising his child and running a ship. Guest stars Osa Massen, William Bendix, Ernest Borgnine
41	2	"The Juan Ortega Story"	David Swift	Story by : Frank Waldman; Teleplay by : David Swift, Peggy Shaw, Lou Shaw	October 8, 1958
Juan awakens to the sound of three men hanging his beloved father. Joining the wagon train, he comes across one of the three, tortured by Indians. He nurses him back to health but only under the guise of looking for the other two killers. Guest star Dean Stockwell
42	3	"The Jennifer Churchill Story"	Jerry Hopper	Robert Yale Libott	October 15, 1958
Jennifer Churchill, pampered all her life, runs away from a smothering lifestyle and pending marriage, and joins the wagon train. With bounty hunters on her heels, she finds Flint, a man who she wants but doesn't want her. Guest stars Rhonda Fleming, Andy Clyde
43	4	"The Tobias Jones Story"	Herschel Daugherty	Harry Von Zell, Jeffrey Shorling	October 22, 1958
Major Adams allows two stowaways, Tobias Jones and his young friend Midge, to stay with the train. But Tobias is in trouble due to his drinking, and things get worse when he's accused of murder. Guest star Lou Costello
44	5	"The Liam Fitzmorgan Story"	Herschel Daugherty	Robert E. Thompson	October 28, 1958
Liam Fitzmorgan has come from Ireland on a mission to kill an informer he believes is traveling with the train. However, his mission is complicated when he falls in love with his target's daughter. Guest star Cliff Robertson
45	6	"The Doctor Willloughby Story"	Allen H. Miner	Harry Von Zell, A. O. Van Zant	November 5, 1958
Concerned about Bart Grover (Alan Marshal), one of the passengers on the wagon train, woman doctor Carol Ames Willoughby (Jane Wyman) tries to help even though she's hampered further by everyone else who shuns her. Meantime an Indian chief needs doctoring and they don't believe in female medicine men.
46	7	"The Bije Wilcox Story"	Abner Biberman	Dorothy M. Johnson, Milton Krims	November 19, 1958
During an attack by Cheyenne Indians, Bije Wilcox (Chill Wills) and Francis Mason (Onslow Stevens) team up to find the lost brother of Stevens. Stevens has offered a $5,000 reward. Mason takes him to Medicine Mark (Lawrence Dobkin), whom Wilcox says is his brother. The Cheyenne kidnap them. A member of the wagon train gets a response from someone who walks through an Indian party that's pinning them all down. What he finds is not what he expected of them.
47	8	"The Millie Davis Story"	Jerry Hopper	Leo Townsend	November 26, 1958
Millie Davis (Nancy Gates) reluctantly takes in an orphaned baby girl. Eight years later the girl's grandmother arrives to retrieve her. But Millie doesn't want to give up the child, so she claims that she and Flint are the parents. Guest star, Evelyn Rudie, James Coburn
48	9	"The Sakae Ito Story"	Herschel Daugherty	Gene L. Coon	December 3, 1958
The major comes upon two Japanese men, attacked by Indians and heading towards California. He learns one of the men plans on committing hara kiri while others on the train have designs on a black box they suspect may contain precious gems. Guest star Sessue Hayakawa
49	10	"The Tent City Story"	Richard Bartlett	Norman Jolley	December 10, 1958
When a member of the train is placed in chains after breaking Indian law by killing a buffalo, Major Adams quarrels with Flint who quits and takes a job at nearby Tent City. But White Eagle discovers the dead buffalo and demands justice. Guest stars Audrey Totter, Wayne Morris, Slim Pickens, Bill Henry
50	11	"The Beauty Jamison Story"	Richard Bartlett	Frank L. Moss	December 17, 1958
Flint finds a dead man beside a memorial with a note stating Deliver to Beauty Jamison. She's the daughter of the man memorialized. Upon visiting her, Flint discovers a woman fighting to continue a legacy while locals struggle to break it. Guest stars Virginia Mayo, Russell Johnson
51	12	"The Mary Ellen Thomas Story"	Virgil W. Vogel	Gene L. Coon, Harry W. Junkin	December 24, 1958
Mary Ellen Thomas (Patty McCormack) is an orphan traveling west to unite with her family, but members of the train reject her due to bad attitude. Her only friend is Sally Mayhew (Jenny Hecht) who is traveling west with her family but dying of consumption (aka Tuberculosis).
52	13	"The Dick Richardson Story"	David Butler	Martin Berkeley, Clark E. Reynolds	December 31, 1958
When the wagon horses start to die of a disease, Adams is forced to send two men who are feuding to buy new horses with his emergency money. One of the men's horse returns without him making Adams wonder if he made a mistake. Guest stars John Ericson, Betty Lynn, Lyle Talbot
53	14	"The Kitty Angel Story"	James Neilson	Leonard Praskins	January 7, 1959
Kitty Angel finds herself not welcome on the wagon train due to her past. When Flint returns to the train toting a sick Indian baby, she has everyone's prejudices to deal with as well as this life threatening illness. Guest stars Anne Baxter, Henry Hull
54	15	"The Flint McCullough Story"	Allen H. Miner	Harry Von Zell, E. Jack Neuman	January 14, 1959
Flint, in love with a Mormon girl he can't marry, joins the confederate army. When he finds out that he won't be joining any battles and what their real purpose is, it may be too late for him and the girl he loves. Guest stars Rebecca Welles, Everett Sloane
55	16	"The Hunter Malloy Story"	Allen H. Miner	Story by : Thomas Thompson; Teleplay by : Gene L. Coon and Thomas Thompson	January 21, 1959
Hunter Malloy and partner get jobs as drivers on the wagon train to rob their boss. Striking gold instead while stopping to repair their wagons, the fever is high as some stop to strike it rich and uncover more than just a few nuggets. Guest stars Lloyd Nolan, Luana Patten, Troy Donahue
56	17	"The Ben Courtney Story"	Abner Biberman	Gene L. Coon, Hendrik Vollaerts	January 28, 1959
Sheriff Ben Courtney (Stephen McNally) 0f Bitter Springs feels he has lots of reasons to hate. When white southern couple John Ramsey (John Larch) and Leona Ramsey (Kay Stewart) want to live there, he tries to take a black child he says they are just using for free labor but his reasons go much deeper than that. Guest stars Judith Ames stars as the sheriff's wife Nora
57	18	"The Ella Lindstrom Story"	Allen H. Miner	Allen H. Miner	February 4, 1959
Ella Lindstrom loses her husband on the wagon train ride west from Boston. With her seven children she decides to stay the course against the wishes of Major Adams. It gets more complicated when she thinks she is expecting number eight. Guest star Bette Davis
58	19	"The Last Man"	James Neilson	Larry Marcus	February 11, 1959
Scouting for a better pass, Flint finds a mountain man, hungry and half out of his mind. With no memory, his strange behavior may endanger the entire wagon train especially when everyone feels they know who he is. Guest star Dan Duryea
59	20	"The Old Man Charvanaugh Story"	Virgil W. Vogel	Arthur Browne, Jr.	February 18, 1959
Flint escorts a wagon, leaving the train, to their new home. When they meet an old man with a wagon load of uncured buffalo skins he's trying to sell, they invite him along as he appears friendly enough. But Flint feels he's too friendly. Guest star J. Carrol Naish
60	21	"The Annie Griffith Story"	Jerry Hopper	Kathleen Hite	February 25, 1959
Flint, seeking safe passage through the mountains, is shot and losing consciousness is dragged to a cabin. Nursed back to health, his savior finds the man who shot him was her husband and Flint had to kill him or be killed. Guest stars Jan Sterling, John Dehner
61	22	"The Jasper Cato Story"	Arthur Hiller	Robert Yale Libott	March 4, 1959
Wanting a safe escort through Indian country, Jasper Cato rides upon the wagon train. Telling the major his reasons for being there, the truth is soon uncovered and it causes two men to come to change their lifelong habits Guest star Brian Donlevy
62	23	"The Vivian Carter Story"	Joseph Pevney	Peggy Shaw, Lou Shaw	March 11, 1959
Getting set to leave the wagon train, Vivian Carter finds out a friend she knows from the train hoped for more than that. Heading to a new life and her first marriage, she's given some options and even at her age has its surprises. Guest stars Phyllis Thaxter, Patric Knowles, Lorne Greene, Jane Darwell
63	24	"The Conchita Vasquez Story"	Aaron Spelling	Harry Von Zell	March 18, 1959
Suspecting a hurt girl he finds on the trail is part of a group of bandits, Flint cautiously helps her but soon learns she is all he suspects until her guardian is killed and Flint becomes her only protection. Guest star Anna Maria Alberghetti
64	25	"The Sister Rita Story"	Joseph Pevney	Gerry Day	March 25, 1959
Leaving the safety of their village, a group of nuns set out to help those Indians in need at a mission. Now Flint must try to help them fight some Ute Indians who don't seem to know the nuns are just there to help them. Guest stars Vera Miles, Frances Bavier
65	26	"The Matthew Lowry Story"	Jack Arnold	Paul David	April 1, 1959
Matthew Lowry (Richard Anderson) seems timid to everyone, especially to the bully Jed Otis (John Pickard) on the wagon train. However, Lowery is in fact a doctor who is willing to help other wagon trains besieged with cholera. Guest stars, Cathleen Nesbitt, Dorothy Provine
66	27	"The Swift Cloud Story"	Virgil W. Vogel	Donald S. Sanford	April 8, 1959
Guest star Rafael Campos as educated Chiricahua Indian Swift Cloud who was sponsored by Major Seth Adams to learn a white man's education. He now returns home to help his people. Henry Brandon as his father Chief Fire Cloud.
67	28	"The Vincent Eaglewood Story"	Jerry Hopper	David Swift	April 15, 1959
An educated man from the East tags alongside the wagon train. When he offers to teach school to pay his passage, all goes well until he is kicked off the train and the kids go looking for him - and they are near an Indian camp. Guest star Wally Cox, Guinn Williams
68	29	"The Clara Duncan Story"	Jerry Hopper	Richard Collins, Warren Wilson	April 22, 1959
Clara Duncan joins the train in a search for her artist fiance. But finding him could lead to trouble, as one of his missing paintings depicting a heinous crime may implicate some of the local Guest star Angie Dickinson
69	30	"The Duke LeMay Story"	Virgil W. Vogel	Robert M. Fresco	April 29, 1959
Duke Le May, an escaped convict, joins the wagon train under an assumed name. When a deputy shows up to arrest him and is killed, Flint is asked to escort him to the nearest fort for trial but he does all he can to prolong that journey. Guest star Cameron Mitchell
70	31	"The Kate Parker Story"	Tay Garnett	Leonard Praskins	May 6, 1959
The wagon train pushes ahead when one of the passengers has an accident. With only a wagon between two couples, one person decides to leave with money including some gold coins. They have an accident and the storm's only getting worse. Guest stars Virginia Gregg, Royal Dano
71	32	"The Steve Campden Story"	Christian Nyby	Robert Yale Libott	May 13, 1959
Flint must find a way to get the wagon train around a snow covered pass. On a scouting trek, he meets a father and son who are willing to help him but they want to hike up the mountain. The adventure ahead has surprises for them all. Guest stars Ben Cooper, Torin Thatcher
72	33	"Chuck Wooster, Wagonmaster"	Virgil W. Vogel	Nat Tanchuck, Arthur Browne, Jr.	May 20, 1959
When a big snow halts the train, several of the men disappear mysteriously with no trace of them to be found. After Flint, Major Adams, and Hawks go missing, it's up to Chuck Wooster to lead the train to safety. Guest star Harry Carey Jr.
73	34	"The Jose Maria Moran Story"	Tay Garnett	Paul King, Joseph Stone	May 27, 1959
Robert Loggia in Wagon Train (1957) The major and party find a Pawnee Indian staked out and left to die. Back at the wagon train, they discover that he's not who they think. The mystery deepens as the Shoshone braves who put him there are still after him and getting closer. Guest stars Robert Loggia as Jose Maria Moran, Anthony Caruso as Don Luis Salazar
74	35	"The Andrew Hale Story"	Virgil W. Vogel	Jean Holloway	June 3, 1959
The Major finds an old man in the desert and takes him to the wagon train. He doesn't remember his name but when he's recognized by one of the other passengers, he remembers not just his name but the faith he thought he lost as well. John McIntire in dual roles
75	36	"The Rodney Lawrence Story"	Virgil W. Vogel	Gerry Day	June 10, 1959
After his parents are killed by whites, a boy is raised by a lone Indian. Years later when the wagon train stops nearby, the Indian tells the young man to join his people. But his previous experience and with the train make him hesitate. Guest star Dean Stockwell
76	37	"The Steele Family Story"	Christian Nyby	Jean Holloway	June 17, 1959
Nearing the end of their trip, a mother with four beautiful daughters, all of marrying age and a wagon train full of men who are either the same or wanting to be and the Major is not off limits either. Guest stars Lee Patrick, John Baer.
77	38	"The Jenny Tannen Story"	Christian Nyby	Kathleen Hite	June 24, 1959
A young girl is injured while on the way to San Francisco to find her famous mother who abandoned her as a baby. The crew helps her with her pending blindness and find her mother who has her own problem unknown to her daughter. Guest star Ann Blyth

=== Season 3 (1959–60) ===
No. overall	No. in season	Title	Directed by	Written by	Original release date
78	1	"The Stagecoach Story"	William Witney	Jean Holloway	September 30, 1959
The men are returning to St. Louis by stagecoach except for Flint - until he becomes the driver to help a friend. They are forced to take a detour to Mexico by other passengers - one of whom denies knowing Flint who is in love with her. Guest stars Debra Paget as Angela DeVarga, Clu Gulager as Caleb Jamison
79	2	"The Greenhorn Story"	Bretaigne Windust	Jean Holloway	October 7, 1959
At the beginning of any wagon train trip, the challenges faced by everyone turns a greenhorn into a seasoned veteran, even if those may mean death of those they love or some other loss. Guest stars Mickey Rooney as Samuel T. Evans, Ellen Corby as Aunt Em, Byron Foulger as Humphrey Pumphret
80	3	"The C.L. Harding Story"	Herschel Daugherty	Story by : Howard Christie & Jean Holloway; Teleplay by : Jean Holloway	October 14, 1959
A reporter has joined the wagon train. When the Major finds out he is a she, he finds his hands full especially when her looks and curiosity jeopardize everyone's safety and their right to vote. Guest stars Claire Trevor in the title role
81	4	"The Estaban Zamora Story"	Bretaigne Windust	Halsey Melone	October 21, 1959
Flint find a young man bleeding to death and a knife nearby. He takes the body to sheriff who identifies the man as the youngest Zamora brother. His father is on the train from Spain. He feels duty bound to kill the murderer. Guest star Ernest Borgnine in the title role. Leonard Nimoy as Bernabe Zamora.
82	5	"The Elizabeth McQueeny Story"	Allen H. Miner	Allen H. Miner	October 28, 1959
Elizabeth McQueeny is traveling with her girls, heading to a finishing school in the West. When her real purpose becomes known, all the females want her gone but her worth to all shows itself before that can happen. Guest star Bette Davis in the title role
83	6	"The Martha Barnham Story"	James Neilson	James A. Parker, Howard Christie, Dale Eunson, Katherine Eunson	November 4, 1959
Flint and a longtime Sioux Indian friend reunite but trouble is brewing as the Cheyenne are on the warpath and in their way is Fort Hastings, an old flame of his and her new Army Captain fiancé. Guest star Ann Blyth, Henry Brandon
84	7	"The Cappy Darrin Story"	Virgil W. Vogel	Stanley Kallis	November 11, 1959
Old salt Cappy Darrin (Ed Wynn) is on the train with his orphaned grandson Tuck (Tom Nolan). But Cappy's daughter granted custody of Tuck to his uncle, and as their parting nears Cappy finds he is reluctant to let Tuck go.
85	8	"The Felizia Kingdom Story"	Joseph Pevney	Leonard Praskins, Sloan Nibley	November 18, 1959
Tough as nails Felizia Kingdom (Judith Anderson) controls an enormous amount of land by force, and no one is good enough to inherit the responsibility. When Flint handles her henchmen with ease, she decides he's the man for the job
86	9	"The Jess MacAbbee Story"	David Butler	Howard Christie, James A. Parker	November 25, 1959
Flint finds a hidden paradise while scouting for food. Andy Devine as Jess MacAbbee, Glenda Farrell as Belle MacAbee
87	10	"The Danny Benedict Story"	Herschel Daugherty	Harold Swanton	December 2, 1959
He says his name is Tom Smith but a young man Major Adams meets on the trail refuses to join the wagon train and won't say why. When he does find out he meets an old friend and why the boy is so tortured. Guest stars Brandon deWilde, Onslow Stevens
88	11	"The Vittorio Bottecelli Story"	Jerry Hopper	Jean Holloway	December 16, 1959
The King orders his womanizing nephew to San Francisco. He joins the wagon train but causes the Major problems as the husbands are complaining but he may have lost his heart to someone who understands. Guest stars Gustavo Rojo, Elizabeth Montgomery, Edgar Barrier
89	12	"The St. Nicholas Story"	Bretaigne Windust	Jean Holloway	December 23, 1959
Almost Christmas eve, the wagon train deals with a happy time, the perils that go with hostile Indians and a little lost boy who may have already been captured by those same hostiles. Guest stars Elisabeth Fraser, Robert Emhardt, Henry Brandon, J.M. Kerrigan
90	13	"The Ruth Marshall Story"	Richard H. Bartlett	Jean Holloway	December 30, 1959
With the wagon train stopped 3 days for repairs, Flint rides off into Sioux territory to look for a white girl who disappeared 11 years ago in the same area. Her father Amos Marshall is on the train hoping to find his daughter who was 8 when the wagon train they were on was attacked and he was the only survivor. When Flint is shot in the thigh by a Sioux arrow, Flint shoots the brave. The brave, son of Chief Red Cloud, crawls to his village while Flint is rescued and tended to by a white woman who never speaks and lives with four wolves. Guest star Luana Patten
91	14	"The Lita Foladaire Story"	Jerry Hopper	Jean Holloway	January 6, 1960
As the wagon train nears the town of Coal Train, Hawks discovers a woman nearly dead by a cabin. They take her to town where the Sheriff identifies her as Lita Foladaire (Diane Brewster), the wife of Jess Foladaire (Kent Smith), who was a Captain under Major Adams in the war. She dies while the doctor is examining her. With Jess out of town, Adams and Hawks decide it is their duty to determine who murdered her.
92	15	"The Colonel Harris Story"	Virgil W. Vogel	Story by : Virgil W. Vogel & Gene L. Coon; Teleplay by : Gene L. Coon	January 13, 1960
Flint goes to Fort Young to see the Harris family and Comanche Chief Bowman Lewis (James Best), a friend from his youth. Charity Harris is dead, killed by Comanches. Colonel James Harris (John Howard) is swearing to wipe out all Indians.
93	16	"The Maidie Brandt Story"	Virgil W. Vogel	Milton Krims	January 20, 1960
Trying to give her son a chance, Maidie Brant (Jean Hagen) is found by the wagon train. Needing fresh horses after a cougar attack, she is reluctant to say why she won't go back to town and buy some but would rather pay top dollar for the Major's. Edward Platt guest stars
94	17	"The Larry Hanify Story"	Ted Post	Harold Swanton	January 27, 1960
On his deathbed, Joe Hanify (Orville Sherman) asks Flint to look after his 17-year old son Larry Hanify (Tommy Sands), and get him to California. There was one catch. His latest escapade put him in jail awaiting trial for armed robbery.
95	18	"The Clayton Tucker Story"	Virgil W. Vogel	Story by : George Shorling; Teleplay by : Thomas Thompson	February 10, 1960
Taking a dangerous route through the desert to join up with the wagon train, a small band of settlers take a turn for the worse when they lose the one man leading them, their scout, and now differ on whether they need to go now. Jeff Morrow as Clayton Tucker
96	19	"The Benjamin Burns Story"	Virgil W. Vogel	Gene L. Coon, Virgil W. Vogel	February 17, 1960
One dry water hole is normal but when the wagon train has two, Flint and Benjamin (J. Carrol Naish) Burns lead a party to find a legend that only the Indians speak of, Shining Water. Troubles await them but the worst may be a too green city boy. Guest stars James Franciscus, Olive Sturgess
97	20	"The Ricky and Laura Bell Story"	Allen H. Miner	Allen H. Miner	February 24, 1960
Laurie Bell (June Lockhart) and Ricky Bell (James Gregory) uproot and go West, leaving their comforts in Baltimore. When she announces she is pregnant, he is less than happy as he feels she has just made their lives more complicated especially where it concerns his needs.
98	21	"The Tom Tuckett Story"	Herschel Daugherty	Jean Holloway based on Great Expectations by Charles Dickens	March 2, 1960
Tom Tuckett (Ben Cooper) has been sent to good schools and looked after by an unknown benefactor. When he joins the wagon train he feels he's about to find out who that is but it isn't who he imagined. Guest stars Ben Cooper, Robert Middleton
99	22	"The Tracy Sadler Story"	Ted Post	Story by : Norman Jolley & Eric Norden; Teleplay by : Norman Jolley	March 9, 1960
Tracy Sadler (Elaine Stritch) and helper Cadge Waldo (Elisha Cook Jr.) join the wagon train, as David Forest (Eugene Martin) learns the truth about his past. Tracy offers to pay Cadge to find Fletcher Forest (Carl Benton Reid) and her twelve year son whom she lost when she went to prison for killing his father. She meets them at Flint's hoedown. David, takes an instant liking to her but Fletcher is wary. David tells Tracy his father has no love for women. As Tracy and David become closer, Fletcher tells her to stay away from both of them accusing her of being his mother.
100	23	"The Alexander Portlass Story"	Jerry Hopper	Leonard Praskin & Dick Nelson	March 16, 1960
Guest star Peter Lorre in the title role, kidnaps McCullough to help him search for the mythical Montezuma's treasure
101	24	"The Christine Elliot Story"	Herschel Daugherty	Jean Holloway	March 23, 1960
Christine Elliot (Phyllis Thaxter) arrives in St. Louis just before her father passes away. He was moving his school for boys from St. Louis to Sacramento, California. The school was closed, but he never had legal guardianship of eleven orphan boys who remain at the orphanage run by Mr. Morton W. Snipple (Henry Daniell).
102	25	"The Joshua Gilliam Story"	Virgil W. Vogel	Story by : Ralph Winters; Teleplay by : Gene L. Coon	March 30, 1960
Joshua Gilliam (Dan Duryea) is a great teacher, whose cultured manners win the heart of heiress Greta Halstadt (Bethel Leslie). Her mother Freda (Irene Tedrow) is not so impressed. Joshua attempts to secretly hypnotize Greta but Freda interrupts, and tells him that Greta will not receive her inheritance unless Freda blesses her marriage. Joshua's stories about the Salem witch trials have the children frightened. He uses hypnosis to tell Freda to ride at midnight to a ghost town to find a doctor. When Freda doesn't return, Major Seth Adams (Ward Bond) gets involved.
103	26	"The Maggie Hamilton Story"	Allen H. Miner	Allen H. Miner	April 6, 1960
When their daughter Maggie (Susan Oliver) runs away from the wagon train, the Hamiltons hire Flint to bring her back.
104	27	"The Jonas Murdock Story"	Virgil W. Vogel	Norman Jolley	April 13, 1960
Jonas Murdock (Noah Beery Jr.) runs afoul of local Indians when he hunts for food on their land.
105	28	"The Amos Gibbon Story"	Joseph Pevney	Gene L. Coon	April 20, 1960
After an argument with Major Adams, an exhausted Flint leaves the wagon train. He cools off at a bar in the nearby town of Silver Creek, not telling Adams or anyone else where he was headed. Unknown to him, locals are shanghaiing strangers for slave labor in the mine. Amos Gibbon (Charles Aidman) makes an escape, only to be captured and returned to the mine.
106	29	"Trial for Murder"	Virgil W. Vogel	Jean Holloway	April 27, 1960
107	30	"Trial for Murder"	Virgil W. Vogel	Jean Holloway	April 27, 1960
Major Adams acts as the judge, with Marshall Thompson as the accused Bradley Mason, and Henry Hull as defense attorney Mark Applewhite. Henry Daniell is opposing counsel Sir Alexander Drew, and Dianne Foster is the deceased's widow Leslie Ivers.
108	31	"The Countess Baranof Story"	Ted Post	Story by : Lee Karson; Teleplay by : Norman Jolley	May 11, 1960
Countess Baranof (Taina Elg) persuades Alex Foster (Peter Leeds) to abandon his wife (Ann B. Davis) to accompany the Countess to Alaska. She also tries to persuade Flint to accompany them. But she's not the one Flint should worry about, as her bodyguard Col. Vasily (Simon Oakland) has a more sinister agenda.
109	32	"The Dick Jarvis Story"	Jerry Hopper	Floyd Burton	May 18, 1960
A boy hurt in a crippling accident and a domineering mother meet a runaway boy whom she feels is making him do things outside his capabilities. Another accident reveals something unexpected since it may pit two friends against each other. Guest stars: Tom Nolan as Dick Jarvis, Vivi Janiss as Mrs. Jarvis, Bobby Diamond as Joey Henshaw
110	33	"The Dr. Swift Cloud Story"	Virgil W. Vogel	Floyd Burton	May 25, 1960
During an Indian attack on the wagon train, Major Adams spares the life of Swift Cloud (Rafael Campos), crippled son of the Indian Chief Fire Cloud (Henry Brandon). Adams is shocked to learn that Swift Cloud's condition is the result of a vicious attack by a half-breed. Fire Cloud sends his son with the wagon train to go see a city doctor who might be able to cure him
111	34	"The Luke Grant Story"	Christian Nyby	Donald Gordon	June 1, 1960
A small friendly band of local Indians find Luke Grant (Donald Woods), out of his mind and firing into the sky. They turn him over to Flint McCullough who is warned that there are hostile Apaches in the area. A wagon with a singing troop of five women join the train. Victoria (Joan O'Brien) is kidnapped by the Apaches, who also kill one of the guards. The train is trapped in camp with the Apaches near them. Luke Grant slips out and brings back the cavalry, along with the rescued Victoria.
112	35	"The Charlene Brenton Story"	Virgil W. Vogel	Floyd Burton	June 8, 1960
A baby girl arrives on the stage with her dead mother. Plague is what people think killed the mother. Charlie Wooster becomes emotionally attached to the baby and tries to hide and protect her. The baby's grandfather arrives with the Sheriff to claim her. They name the baby Charlene after Charlie. Ward Bond appears as Major Seth Adams.
113	36	"The Sam Livingston Story"	Joseph Pevney	Harold Swanton	June 15, 1960
Abigail Newkirk (Barbara Eiler) hires Sam Livingston (Charles Drake) to be her new driver for her trip west. Livingston claims to own a bank and a pig. Cass Fleming (Onslow Stevens) is running for US Senator from California, and also offers to drive her. He owns part of the same bank as Sam Livingston, which was in financial trouble until Livingston put up the money to bail it out, now owning the controlling interest. He also offers to drive her as having made the trip before.
114	37	"The Shad Bennington Story"	Joseph Pevney	Fred Cassidy	June 22, 1960
Denver medicine man Shadrack Bennington (David Wayne) parts ways with Princess Fatima (Laurie Mitchell) who wants to marry him and go east. He deserts her and joins the wagon train headed for San Francisco, taking Caesar the lion with him.

=== Season 4 (1960–61) ===
No. overall	No. in season	Title	Directed by	Written by	Original release date
115	1	"Wagons Ho!"	Herschel Daugherty	Jean Holloway	September 28, 1960
While preparing to return to St. Joseph, the men read the story "Wagon Ho" written and printed by Samuel T. Evans (Mickey Rooney) about his trip as a naive young Irishman headed west and his experiences and adventure on the trail.
116	2	"The Horace Best Story"	Jerry Hopper	Jean Holloway	October 5, 1960
Major Adams' "distant" cousin Horace (George Gobel) arrives hoping to be a wagon master. His trading skills allow him to steal the crew and vendors from Adams but when Adams confronts him with the decisions he must make on the trail, there are second thoughts.
117	3	"The Albert Farnsworth Story"	Herschel Daugherty	Gene L. Coon	October 12, 1960
Arrogant British Colonel Albert Farnsworth (Charles Laughton) causes an uproar in camp and puts the wagon train in danger of Indian attack, resulting in the capture of a young girl by the Cheyenne and the mortal wounding of his long time aide.
118	4	"The Allison Justis Story"	Ted Post	Norman Jolley	October 19, 1960
Flint shoots a man believing he was a horse thief. He later finds out the man was the mayor, and deemed innocent. He was the husband of a childhood friend Allison Justis (Gloria DeHaven) The question of whether he killed an innocent man bothers him and the man's son.
119	5	"The Jose Morales Story"	Virgil W. Vogel	Gene L. Coon	October 26, 1960
Bill Hawkes is leading three wagons through Indian territory. They run into trouble with Mexician bandits led by Jose Morales (Lee Marvin). Lon Chaney Jr. appears as Louis Roque.
120	6	"Princess of a Lost Tribe"	Richard Whorf	Jean Holloway	November 2, 1960
Ordered by Major Adams to guide three passengers to a campsite up a haunted mountain, Flint does so but with caution: rumors that an escaped group of Aztecs now live there, almost 400 years after Cortez supposedly wiped them all out. Linda Lawson as Lia, and Raymond Massey as Montezuma IX
121	7	"The Cathy Eckhart Story"	Sutton Roley	Story by : Vince Giffoni; Teleplay by : Vince Giffoni & Sutton Roley	November 9, 1960
Ben Harness (John Larch) murders the father of Cathy Eckhart (Susan Oliver) and admits it. A trial is held, and Harness is found guilty and hanged. An unknown scout and Kiowa Indians threaten the pass. Now there may be a renegade and murderer in their midst which Adams must resolve before continuing. Cathy herself is later found hanged and scalped. Martin Landau is the preacher
122	8	"The Bleymier Story"	Virgil W. Vogel	Story by : Milton Krims; Teleplay by : William Raynor & Myles Wilder	November 16, 1960
Flint, Hawks and Wooster are leading a small group of wagons split off the main train to the Dakotas. Heed the signs! Or so says Samuel Bleymier (Dan Duryea). The wagon train has to travel through a Sioux Indian burial ground. That may have consequences all its own but what of the signs? Flint takes a vote with Justin Claiborne (James Drury) casting the deciding vote to cross the Sioux grounds.
123	9	"The Colter Craven Story"	John Ford	Story by : John Ford; Teleplay by : Tony Paulson	November 23, 1960
Dr. Colter Craven (Carleton Young) feels he can't perform surgery any longer. When he joins the wagon train and his services are desperately needed, he realizes he may be wrong after Major Adams gives him a history lesson. Guest stars, Anna Lee, and numerous John Ford frequent cast members (see separate article)
124	10	"The Jane Hawkins Story"	R. G. Springsteen	Norman Jolley	November 30, 1960
Flint discovers badly wounded waitress Jane Hawkins (Myrna Fahey) on the range and takes her to a doctor, where he finds the town's owner wants to hang her without trial, because he suspects she murdered his son.
125	11	"The Candy O'Hara Story"	Tay Garnett	Harold Swanton	December 7, 1960
Gabe Henry (Jim Davis) and his son Luther have been sorely missing the female touch over five years now. Gabe and Luther go to town with the idea of finding Gabe a wife. Finding a wife during a stopover is his top priority is Candy O'Hara (Joan O'Brien). Major Adams and he does not approve.
126	12	"The River Crossing"	Jesse Hibbs	Jean Holloway	December 14, 1960
A green Army Colonel (Charles Aidman), who mistakenly thought the Comanche killed one of his officers, retaliates by wipeing out a village of Comanche women. After he shows Flint the arrow, Flint tells him the arrow is Kiowa - not Comanche. The wagon train must face on the one side a swollen river they must cross or on the other, a Comanche chief who seeks justice.
127	13	"The Roger Bigelow Story"	Jerry Hopper	Floyd Burton	December 21, 1960
Minister Roger Bigelow (Robert Vaughn ) uses money from his father to help outlaw Wes Varney (Claude Akins). Major Adams is skeptical that the outlaw might be faking his redemption.
128	14	"The Jeremy Dow Story"	Virgil W. Vogel	Harold Swanton	December 28, 1960
When the wagon train passes through town, habitually drunk Jeremy Dow (Leslie Nielsen) finds that his past has caught up with him. His choices: continue running, or face the demons from his past when he is confronted with this wife and son on the train.
129	15	"The Earl Packer Story"	Sutton Roley	Gene L. Coon	January 4, 1961
Ex-lawman Bill Strode (Edward Binns) arrives in camp looking for Flint. Strode, who saved Flint's life in Abilene, asks Flint to help him get to Fort Kearny. Strode now has a price of $5000 on his head. Bounty hunter Earl Packer (Ernest Borgnine) is anxious to find him.
130	16	"The Patience Miller Story"	Mitchell Leisen	Jean Holloway	January 11, 1961
Quaker schoolteacher Patience Miller (Rhonda Fleming) heads to the Arapaho nation on the wagon train when her husband is killed by the Comanches. Patience is confronted immediately by Chief Spotted Horse and braves but they back off when they see her red hair calling her a medicine woman. She meets the Chief and his willingness to fight another Indian nation puts her right in the middle of each tribe's pride and customs. Michael Ansara, Jason Robards Sr., Henry Brandon
131	17	"The Sam Elder Story"	Herschel Daugherty	William Raynor & Myles Wilder	January 18, 1961
Retired Captain Sam Elder (Everett Sloane) and ten boys join the wagon train on their way to California. The boys are orphans of soldiers that fought and died under Elder in the war. he hopes to open a military academy. Hitching a ride was all he thought he was involving the boys with until he meets one man on the train with a secret resentment.
132	18	"Weight of Command"	Herschel Daugherty	Harold Swanton	January 25, 1961
Bill and Major Adams plan on going hunting with a friend but when he is not home they suspect a renegade party of Cheyenne who have broken the peace treaty and the wagon train may be their next target. Guest star Tommy Rettig
133	19	"The Prairie Story"	Mitchell Leisen	Jean Holloway	February 1, 1961
The story of the women of the wagon train and the unforgiving prairie through which they pass. Who will endure, and who will give up? Who will live, and who will die? Guest stars Beulah Bondi as Grandma Bates, John Archer as Matt Kirby
134	20	"Path of the Serpent"	Virgil W. Vogel	Jean Holloway	February 8, 1961
At a Rocky Mountains fort, a wounded soldier asks his old friend Ruddy Blaine (Noah Beery Jr.) to bring his daughter to him before he dies. With the Ute Indians on the warpath, Blaine will have to take a dangerous route known only to him and his Shoshone friend The Serpent (Jay Silverheels), who knows a secret trail.
135	21	"The Odyssey of Flint McCullough"	Frank Arrigo	Leonard Praskins & Sloan Nibley	February 15, 1961
Looking forward to some time off, Flint heads towards the town of Monument but runs into an old man and some kids whose parents were just massacred by Mescalero Apaches. The children are running low on supplies especially milk for the baby. Guest star Henry Hull
136	22	"The Beth Pearson Story"	Virgil W. Vogel	Norman Jolley	February 22, 1961
Ron (Johnny Washbrook) and Beth Pearson (Virginia Grey) join the wagon train to travel to Denver. Beth is a twin copy of Ranie Webster who was Major Adams one true love before the war. She had refused to marry him. Note: Final appearance of Ward Bond.
137	23	"The Jed Polke Story"	Virgil W. Vogel	Peter Germano	March 1, 1961
Flint brings stranded woman Rheba Polke (Joyce Meadows) and her son to the train. When her husband Jed Polke (John Lasell) returns with help, many recognize him from the Macon, Georgia Andersonville Prison (Confederate prisoner-of-war camp) where prisoners were planning an escape. Polke had turned their escape attempt in to the authorities. They have sworn to kill Polke.
138	24	"The Nancy Palmer Story"	John English	Theodore Ferro & Matilde Ferro	March 8, 1961
Married couple Nancy (Audrey Meadows) and Dan Palmer (Jack Cassidy) feign innocence, especially among children. While the adults are misled by those benign facades, Dan later pulls off a $20,000 bank robbery
139	25	"The Christopher Hale Story"	Herschel Daugherty	Lawrence Menkin	March 15, 1961
John McIntire's first episode as Chris Hale (he appeared in Season 2, episode #74 as Andrew Hale). The company that owns the wagon train recently hired Jud Benedict (Lee Marvin) as wagon master, but that isn't working out well. Flint McCullough (Robert Horton) then offers the position to retired wagon master Chris Hale.
140	26	"The Tiburcio Mendez Story"	David Lowell Rich	Gene L. Coon	March 22, 1961
Tiburcio Mendez (Nehemiah Persoff) and other Californios of Spanish descent halt the wagon train because they want to keep settlers out. Judge Josiah Black (Russell Collins) tries to negotiate a peaceful resolution but not everyone wants peace. Leonard Nimoy appears as Joaquin Delgado
141	27	"The Nellie Jefferson Story"	Virgil W. Vogel	Harold Swanton	April 5, 1961
Charlie Wooster is smitten by actress Nellie Jefferson (Janis Paige), when she joins the train. Not so with others, who tire of her incessant demands for special treatment. Meanwhile an obsessed man from her past is following her, talking about how she will meet her fate like the biblical Jezebel.
142	28	"The Saul Bevins Story"	Joseph Pevney	Jean Holloway	April 12, 1961
Saul Bevins (Rod Steiger) is a visually impaired doctor traveling with his son, his sister, and his dog.
143	29	"The Joe Muharich Story"	Virgil W. Vogel	Gene L. Coon	April 19, 1961
Polish immigrant Joe Muharich (Akim Tamiroff) was widowed by thugs who also killed his son. He later tries unsuccessfulyl to befriend and help straighten out thug Johnny Kamen (Robert Blake).
144	30	"The Duke Shannon Story"	Virgil W. Vogel	Norman Jolley	April 26, 1961
Charlie Wooster decides to search for a gold mine with Henry Shannon (Frank McHugh). Bill Hawks and Shannon's grandson Duke go after the two men, but they aren't the only ones.
145	31	"The Will Santee Story"	Ted Post	Harold Swanton	May 3, 1961
The Santee family have been shunned every where due to a past thing a family member did. They confide in Hale, Hawks, and Charlie, who agree to keep their secret from the others on the train. But it soon larks anyway. Guest stars Millie Perkins, Dean Stockwell, Harry von Zell
146	32	"The Jim Bridger Story"	David Butler	Jean Holloway	May 10, 1961
Army Scout Jim Bridger (Karl Swenson), an old family friend of Flint's, commandeers the train to save troops trapped by a tribe of Ute people.
147	33	"The Eleanor Culhane Story"	Ted Post	Gene L. Coon	May 17, 1961
Flint visits Eleanor Culhane (Felicia Farr), his former love interest who subsequently married a notorious gunman. Towns people avoid her. Believing her husband had been dead for years, Flint begins seeing her, when her husband returns. Flint realizes there is another side to Eleanor that he was unaware of as well.
148	34	"The Chalice"	Virgil W. Vogel	William Raynor & Myles Wilder	May 24, 1961
Lisa Canevari (Argentina Brunetti) and her husband Marcello Canevari (Harold Heifetz) are an Italian immigrant couple needing help in transporting water for their grapevines to California. Unfortunately, the two men who offer the use of their wagon plan to steal the treasure they've heard the immigrants are carrying. Guest star Lon Chaney Jr.
149	35	"The Janet Hale Story"	David Lowell Rich	Norman Jolley	May 31, 1961
After losing one of her children in an accident, Janet Hale (Jeanette Nolan) becomes bitterly resentful of the wagon train and plans to turn back east, while her husband wishes to continue west. Hale, in an effort to persuade her to continue, tells her the story of his own trip west with his family and the ensuing tragedy
150	36	"Wagon to Fort Anderson"	Ted Post	Peter Germano	June 7, 1961
Flint discovers four survivors of an Indian massacre. Despite the ordeal they've survived, they're still unaware of the danger ahead and don't know whether to trust Flint. Complicating matters, one member of the group works against Flint. Guest stars farns Salmi, Don Rickles. Candy Moore
151	37	"The Ah Chong Story"	Virgil W. Vogel	Story by : Terry Wilson; Teleplay by : Sheldon Bonbewell	June 14, 1961
Charlie Wooster is laid off, replaced by Chinese cook Ah Chong. Arnold Stang, a Jewish comedic actor from New York, portrays Ah Chong
152	38	"The Don Alvarado Story"	David Butler	Jean Holloway	June 21, 1961
A dying Spanish nobleman asks Flint to impersonate Don Alvarado (Martin Garralaga) to claim the inheritance for the rest of his family. This brings Flint into contact with the men who murdered the nobleman.

=== Season 5 (1961–62) ===
Final season to air on NBC. Several season 5 episodes are in color.

No. overall	No. in season	Title	Directed by	Written by	Original release date
153	1	"The Captain Dan Brady Story"	Virgil W. Vogel	Gene L. Coon	September 27, 1961
Captain Dan Brady (Joseph Cotten) is a colorful, boisterous veteran frontier scout famous in the East. He demands to be taken on as trail scout. Hale faces a dilemma as he will lose a freight contract necessary to finance the wagon train if he doesn't hire Brady. Dawn Wells as Mrs. Murray
154	2	"The Kitty Albright Story"	David Butler	Norman Jolley	October 4, 1961
Kitty Allbright (Polly Bergen) is a registered nurse whose stagecoach is attacked and destroyed. Flint agrees to let her use her new skill on the wagon train. She quickly becomes disturbed at the lack of hygiene and health in general around the train. Note: This episode was filmed and shown in color.
155	3	"The Maud Frazer Story"	David Butler	Story by : Rip Van Ronkle; Teleplay by : Rip Van Ronkle & Norman Jolley	October 11, 1961
Maud Frazer (Barbara Stanwyck) takes command of her wagon train after all the men are killed. Flint tries to dissuade Maud from going through hostile Indian country where there is gold. She proceeds anyway but is forced to change plans.
156	4	"The Selena Hartnell Story"	Jerry Hopper	William Raynor & Myles Wilder	October 18, 1961
Selena Hartnell (Jan Sterling) joins the train after bandits attack her wagon. Later, she reveals she is a bounty hunter looking for William Barrett, a murderer on the run. It turns out that Barrett is Will Cotrell (Claude Akins), the leader of pacifists on the train.
157	5	"The Clementine Jones Story"	David Lowell Rich	Harold Swanton	October 25, 1961
Chris Hale and Bill Hawks ride into the small town of Cinnabar for supplies. The Cinnabar Purity League is gathered to force pretty saloon girl Clementine Jones (Ann Blyth) to leave town on the next stage. A robbery occurs. Clementine ends up joining the Hale wagon train. One of the bank robbers is also going with the wagon train. Dick York as Willie Pettigrew, Roger Mobley as Homer Pedigrew
158	6	"The Jenna Douglas Story"	Virgil W. Vogel	Story by : Peggy & Lou Shaw; Teleplay by : John McGreevey	November 1, 1961
The widowed Jenna Douglas (Carolyn Jones) is found by wagon train scouts. Nearby is a discarded straitjacket. It is believed she survived an attack, and is subsequently adopted by the train. Some have their doubts about her story and her mental state. Note: This episode was filmed and shown in color.
159	7	"The Artie Matthewson Story"	Jerry Hopper	Thomas Thompson	November 8, 1961
Duke finds Flint's dying foster mother Angie Matthewson (Jane Darwell) who asks Flint to check on her real son Artie Matthewson (Rory Calhoun) whom she hasn't seen in five years. His reputation as a trouble maker precedes him. Flint finds him on the right side of the law - or is he?
160	8	"The Mark Miner Story"	Herschel Daugherty	Norman Jolley	November 15, 1961
Mark Miner (Michael Burns) and his younger brother Matthew join the wagon train after making it appear their own wagon has broken down. The passengers of the train enjoy Mark's guitar and singing, but soon items and money begin disappearing. What they don't realize is that the two brothers want to frame Duke Shannon for the thievery, because they blame him for the imprisonment of their father and want revenge for it. Barbara Parkins as Eve
161	9	"The Bruce Saybrook Story"	Virgil W. Vogel	Peter Germano	November 22, 1961
Lord Bruce Saybrook (Brian Aherne), London millionaire, takes his brother, wife, and employee out west on a hunting trip hoping to repair his relationships. They run into hostile Indians. During the ensuing battle, everyone's true character comes out. Antoinette Bower as Diana Saybrook
162	10	"The Lizabeth Ann Calhoun Story"	Virgil W. Vogel	Norman Jolley	December 6, 1961
Lizabeth Ann Calhoun (Dana Wynter) meets the wagon train staff as they stop for supplies. She asks permission to join the train so she can avoid the advances of a young man she claims is in love with her, however his real motives may be very different. Note: This episode was filmed and shown in color.
163	11	"The Traitor"	Dick Moder	Norman Jolley	December 13, 1961
Nick Adams as Sam Upton. Convicted of horse-stealing, Flint receives from Chris 20 lashes followed by banishment from the train. It's a ruse to allow Flint to go undercover to trap outlaw Angel de Muerte (angel of death).
164	12	"The Bettina May Story"	Richard Donner	Allen H. Miner	December 20, 1961
Bettina May (Bette Davis) is a widow of an Army officer, traveling west with her two sons, Arthur and Nathan.
165	13	"Clyde"	Virgil W. Vogel	Gene L. Coon	December 27, 1961
A humorous story about Charlie finding an injured buffalo and names him Clyde. He keeps Clyde as a pet. Others don't appreciate him. Clyde the buffalo as himself, Harry von Zell as John Sherman, Frank de Kova as Arapahoe Chief
166	14	"The Martin Onyx Story"	Jerry Hopper	Robert Yale Libott	January 3, 1962
A man finds a corpse that looks remarkably like himself. On an impulse he takes on the persona of the dead man only to find he was a living legend of west and had made a lot of enemies along the way. Jack Warden as Martin Onyx
167	15	"The Dick Pederson Story"	Marje Blood	Leonard Praskins	January 10, 1962
Overwhelmed Janey Cutler (Anne Helm) takes on her deceased father's responsibilities, including watching over her mother and 5 sisters and is suspicious of drifter Dick Pederson (James MacArthur).
168	16	"The Hobie Redman Story"	Virgil W. Vogel	Thomas Thompson	January 17, 1962
Three wagons are late. It's Duke's responsibility to bring them to the wagon train. Lin McCarthy guest stars as Hobie Redman
169	17	"The Malachi Hobart Story"	David Butler	Ken Kolb	January 24, 1962
At first glance, the preacher Malachi Hobart (Franchot Tone) appeasers as someone dedicating his life for the good of mankind. It later turns out he's a con artist. Irene Ryan as Martha Gresham.
170	18	"The Dr. Denker Story"	Frank Arrigo	William Douglas Lansford, Steven Ritch	January 31, 1962
Bill spots a young boy alone on the trail. He passes out but they later learn he can't talk but that he saw his dad killed by strangers for no apparent reason. Later, they run into Dr. Denker (Theodore Bikel) taking musical instruments to California. Billy to run away from the doctor and the wagon train.
171	19	"The Lonnie Fallon Story"	Virgil W. Vogel	Harold Swanton	February 7, 1962
Gary Clarke as Cowboy Lonnie Fallon is in love with Kathy Jennings---but her strict father forbids the relationship. Note: This episode was filmed and shown in color.
172	20	"The Jeff Hartfield Story"	Dick Moder	Leonard Praskins	February 14, 1962
Jeff Hartfield becomes concerned when his sister Jenny begins dating Dallas who threatens him with an orphanage at journey's end. Jeff takes off but Dallas follows with deadly intent, believing Jeff knows the location of $30,000. Jack Chaplain as Jeff Hartfield
173	21	"The Daniel Clay Story"	Don Rich	Steven Ritch	February 21, 1962
Judge Daniel Clay (Claude Rains) and his family join the wagon train. He has a reputation for cleaning up frontier towns, but his fanatical attention to the law sees him ostracized as often as he is praised. The Judge's son, Ethan (Peter Helm) has been reading the law with his father, but begins to neglect it when John Cole's sister Frances (Maggie Pierce) shows an interest in him and he in her. Hal Smith as Carl Grant
174	22	"The Lieutenant Burton Story"	David Butler	Story by : Ken Kalb; Teleplay by : Steven Ritch	February 28, 1962
Lieutenant Burton (Dean Jones) is on his first assignment. He deals with vicious sergeant Kile (Charles McGraw) who is determined to kill two deserters in cold blood. The sergeant wounds Christopher Hale thinking he is one of them and gets into a feud with Flint at the train.
175	23	"The Charley Shutup Story"	Virgil W. Vogel	Gene L. Coon	March 7, 1962
The wagon train is approaching the area where the Donner party was lost. The military has warned them that the Bannock tribe is causing problems and bad weather is possible so Chris decides they should stop the wagon train until there is clear weather so they can cross the pass safely. Dick York as Charley Shutup
176	24	"The Amos Billings Story"	Dick Moder	Peter Germano	March 14, 1962
The wagon train encounters Amos Billings (Paul Fix) who tells of a new road that might shorten their trip and avoid Indian trouble. Chris and Flint are very suspicious of the situation since the location has been a dead end. Flint scouts the supposed new route.
177	25	"The Baylor Crofoot Story"	Prentiss Combs	John McGreevey	March 21, 1962
Baylor Crofoot (Robert Culp) is a teacher traveling with the wagon train. He encounters conflict when he become attracted to the daughter of a medicine man who has just joined the train. The man despises cowards and sees the teacher as one. Baylor Crofoot spots their daughter Ruth getting water so he offers to help. This raises the ire of her father who tells Baylor to stay away from Ruth. Leonard Nimoy as Emeterio Vasquez. Baylor Crofoot, the wagon train school teacher
178	26	"The George B. Hanrahan Story"	Virgil W. Vogel	Gene L. Coon	March 28, 1962
An ousted Ute medicine man Running Bear (Frank de Kova) is rescued by Duke Shannon. George B. Hanrahan who is an old political shyster from back east decides to take Running Bear in with him and his nephew Tim Hogan.
179	27	"The Swamp Devil"	Dick Moder	Norman Jolley	April 4, 1962
Joshua (Philip Bourneuf) stayed behind with his wife and his hand-built piano on the previous year's trip, after the piano proved too heavy to haul it through the swamp. Joshua's wife later died in the swamp, and he vowed revenge on McCullough for her death. Now going through the same swamp a year latter, Chief Bear Claw (Robert Bice) tries to warn the wagon train about strange sounds and an evil spirit. Both Charlie Wooster and Bill Hawks (Terry Wilson) sense they are being watched.
180	28	"The Cole Crawford Story"	Frank Arrigo	Thomas Thompson	April 11, 1962
Cole Crawford (James Drury) and his wife Helen (Diana Millay) are trying to leave their past behind' but are having difficulty doing it.
181	29	"The Levi Hale Story"	Virgil W. Vogel	Leonard Praskins	April 18, 1962
John McIntire plays Christopher Hale's twin brother Levi. Chris Hale is traveling to the Wyoming prison to pick up his brother Levi---who's about to be released from prison. Chris assumed Levi was pardoned but he was paroled to Chris. He must keep Levi out of Wyoming or he will be hanged.
182	30	"The Terry Morrell Story"	Jesse Hibbs	Peter Germano	April 25, 1962
After the sheriff escorts Ben Morrell (Henry Jones) and his son Terry (David Ladd) to the wagon train, one woman wants to adopt Terry.
183	31	"The Jud Steele Story"	Ted Post	Peter Germano	May 2, 1962
Bill Hawks returns the horse and belongings of a man he shot, identified as Jud Steele (Edward Binns). Everyone in town tells him Steele had been dead for years, the corpse must be someone else. Hawks insists everything he finds on the man identifies him as Steele . After consistently denying the man is Steele, widow Ursula Steele (Mary LaRoche ), confesses that her husband left her for another woman long ago, and she went with the town lie of his dying years before, because it was all she could handle.
184	32	"The Mary Beckett Story"	Dick Moder	Story by : Paul Hayward; Teleplay by : Steven Ritch	May 9, 1962
A Frenchman arouses strong---and polarized---emotions among the wagon train members: men distrust him, women adore him. He owes a substantial gambling debt and plans to pay it off by convincing a woman to pay it until he is killed. (Anne Jeffreys) as Mary Beckett, (Jocelyn Brando) as Martha Lane
185	33	"The Nancy Lee Davis Story"	Dick Moder	Steven Ritch	May 16, 1962
Flint lapses into his memory where he recalls that eight years ago three men robbed his fiancé, Nancy Lee Davis (Lory Patrick), of their silver wedding gifts. During the robbery she is shot in a struggle and dies later in Flint's arms. Cloris Leachman as Loretta
186	34	"The Frank Carter Story"	Virgil W . Vogel	Steven Ritch	May 23, 1962
Gambler Jason Carter has been missing for five years. Duke Shannon's (Denny Miller) resemblance to him makes him the target for a murderer's bullet. Albert Salmi as Frank Carter
187	35	"The John Turnbull Story"	Charles F. Haas	Gene L. Coon	May 30, 1962
Bill and Charlie help old friend and Ute lawyer John Turnbull (Henry Silva) defend his reservation against a range war aimed at the army pushing residents off their land.
188	36	"The Hiram Winthrop Story"	Virgil W. Vogel	Peter Germano	June 6, 1962
Easterner Hiram Winthrope (Eduard Franz) is the new Indian Agent for the Apache reservation. Duke quits the wagon train to become Deputy Indian Agent. Hiram wants to train the Apaches to become farmers.
189	37	"The Heather Mahoney Story"	Virgil W. Vogel	Norman Jolley	June 13, 1962
Chris Hale has dinner with society matron Heather Mahoney (Jane Wyatt) whose spooked carriage team he had stopped. The wagon train crew suddenly feel threatened that he might give up his occupation for her.

=== Season 6 (1962–63) ===
First season to air on ABC.

No. overall	No. in season	Title	Directed by	Written by	Original release date
190	1	"Wagon Train Mutiny"	Virgil W. Vogel	Norman Jolley	September 19, 1962
Bill and Duke find a young wounded Comanchero who tells them they are to be attacked. Jane Wyman, Dan Duryea, Regis Toomey guest stars
191	2	"The Caroline Casteel Story"	Virgil W. Vogel	Gerry Day	September 26, 1962
Barbara Stanwyck guest stars as Indian captive Caroline Casteel. Roger Mobley as her son Jamie, Charles Drake as her husband Frank Casteel
192	3	"The Madame Sagittarius Story"	Jerry Hopper	Leonard Praskins	October 3, 1962
Madame Sagittarius (Thelma Ritter) is a bit of a con woman, who sells patent medicine, and has recently spent time in jail. Although Charlie Wooster is suspicious of her, by the end of the episode, he's fallen in love and wants to marry her.
193	4	"The Martin Gatsby Story"	Dick Moder	Thomas Thompson	October 10, 1962
Wealthy merchant Martin Gatsby (Fred Clark) wants to get west to open a new business. With little for compassion for others, he demands that Hale avoids delays by leaving inexperienced Caleb Lefton (James McCallion) and his family behind. Directed by Jerry Hopper
194	5	"The John Augustus Story"	Allen H. Miner	Allen H. Miner	October 17, 1962
Joseph Cotten guest stars as John Augustus who wins the Chinese woman Mayleen (Nobu McCarthy) in a poker game. James Hong as Ceong Wai Kok
195	6	"The Mavis Grant Story"	Dick Moder	Steven Ritch	October 24, 1962
Ann Sheridan stars as Mavis Grant, who owns the only source of water for miles. But Miss Grant is a bitter and cold-hearted woman who demands an outrageous price for the water.
196	7	"The Lisa Raincloud Story"	Virgil W. Vogel	Story by : Dana Wynter and Steven Ritch; Teleplay by : Steven Ritch	October 31, 1962
Bill Hawks is caught with three Indian grave robbers being chased by the Indians. He is the only one captured and is to be killed until he and the Chief's daughter fall in love. However, the leading brave has other ideas for her and Bill. George Keymas guest stars
197	8	"The Shiloh Degnan Story"	Virgil W. Vogel	Harold Swanton	November 7, 1962
Gravely wounded Army Major Dan Marriott (Russell Johnson) tells Chris about his commander Shiloh Degnan. Barry Morse, Nancy Gates, R. G. Armstrong guest star
198	9	"The Levy-McGowan Story"	Dick Moder	Bob Barbash	November 14, 1962
The Simon Levy (Leo Fuchs) family and the family of Patrick McGowan (Liam Redmond) compete in checkers.
199	10	"The John Bernard Story"	Allen H. Miner	John Kneubuhl	November 21, 1962
Elderly wagon train passenger Mary Budgeon (Doris Kemper) is kidnapped by Indians. They will return her unharmed, if the train's doctor will cure the chief's son. Robert Ryan as priest Father John Bernard, Beau Bridges as Larry Gill.
200	11	"The Kurt Davos Story"	Bernard Girard	Ted Sherdeman	November 28, 1962
Kurt Davos (Eddie Albert), a highly respected man, is badly injured while trying to save Florence Hastings (Frances Reid). In return, Florence volunteers to live with and care for Kurt, now paralyzed.
201	12	"The Eve Newhope Story"	Bernard Girard	John McGreevey	December 5, 1962
Patrick O'Shaughnessy (Tudor Owen) has come to visit his daughter Eve (Ann Blyth), believing her to be a respectable married woman. Knowing that Eve actually is the popular owner of a saloon, Hawks, Wooster, Duke, and Eve's favorite patrons decide to change Eve.
202	13	"The Orly French Story"	Virgil W. Vogel	Norman Jolley	December 12, 1962
Orly French (Peter Fonda) is a bank robber being brought to justice by Marshal Jason Hartman (John Doucette).
203	14	"The Donna Fuller Story"	Virgil W. Vogel	Norman Jolley	December 19, 1962
Donna Fuller (Jeanne Cooper) and three companions in a runaway wagon are rescued by a winemaker and Charlie. They are against the consumption of alcohol and join the wagon train. However, she begins to fall for the winemaker until she learns his trade. Simon Oakland guest stars
204	15	"The Sam Darland Story"	Walter Wagner	Story by : Walter Wagner; Teleplay by : Steven Ritch & Walter Wagner	December 26, 1962
The wagon train finds Sam Darland (Art Linkletter) with orphan boys in an old ghost town. Hale tries to convince Darland that it is not safe to stay in the town, as it in the midst of Indian territory and the leader of the tribe has been on the warpath. Nancy Davis, Bill Mumy, Rusty Stevens guest stars
205	16	"The Abel Weatherly Story"	Dick Moder	Robert Yale Libott	January 2, 1963
Abel Weatherly (J. D. Cannon) is a sea captain traveling west haunted by nightmares from his past is found stranded, injured and drunk by Bill and Charlie. After hearing his story, they help him reach his destination to locate a ghost: a dead sailor that may be alive. John Ashley as Michelangelo Fratelli
206	17	"The Davey Baxter Story"	Dick Moder	Pat Fielder	January 9, 1963
When his wagon falls down a cliff, Davey Baxter's mother is killed, and his arm is crushed. The doctor is unavailable, so Chris is forced to make the decision to amputate. This changes everything for Davey and the girl he plans to marry. Tommy Sands, Jeannine Riley guest stars
207	18	"The Johnny Masters Story"	Bernard Girard	Peter Germano	January 16, 1963
Anthony George guest stars as a soldier torn between two worlds - his Cherokee heritage, and his duty to the United States Army.
208	19	"The Naomi Kaylor Story"	Bernard Girard	William Raynor and Myles Wilder	January 30, 1963
Hawks rides to the John Kaylor ranch to buy horses for the train but John just died. His widow Naomi refuses to sell the horses at the price John had promised. Naomi shows no sorrow over her husband's death, only wanting to sell the ranch. Joan Fontaine as Naomi Kaylor, Natalie Trundy as Grace Kaylor
209	20	"The Hollister John Garrison Story"	Sydney Pollack	Gene L. Coon	February 6, 1963
Bitter alcoholic Stevenson Drake develops a dislike for the even tempered John Hollister, a fellow Southerner, when he learns he didn't fight for the Confederacy. He also is bothered by the friendliness between his wife and Hollister. Charles Drake guest stars
210	21	"The Lily Legend Story"	Virgil W. Vogel	Leonard Praskins & Sloan Nibley	February 13, 1963
While riding through the desert plains, Duke and Charlie come across a sheriff as he is about to die of a heart attack and his female prisoner, Lily Legend, a childhood sweetheart of Duke who the sheriff is taking to be hanged for murder. Susan Oliver, Richard Jaeckel guest stars
211	22	"Charlie Wooster - Outlaw"	Virgil W. Vogel	Leonard Praskins	February 20, 1963
Bella McKavitch wants to kidnap Chris Hale, in order to find out about a gold shipment which she thinks the wagon train is carrying, but her dimwitted sons nab Wooster instead. To stop them, Wooster pretends to be a robber himself. Jeanette Nolan, L.Q. Jones, Morgan Woodward, Frank Ferguson guest stars
212	23	"The Sara Proctor Story"	Virgil W. Vogel	Leonard Praskins	February 27, 1963
Jean Hagen in the title role; Chris Robinson as her mentally troubled son Brad Proctor. Rumors of witchcraft and insanity follow them.
213	24	"The Emmett Lawton Story"	Virgil W. Vogel	Gene L. Coon	March 6, 1963
Dennis Hopper guest stars as Emmett Lawton, who wants revenge on his father's death in the semi-deserted town of High Times.
214	25	"The Annie Duggan Story"	James Sheldon	John McGreevey and Gary Munn	March 13, 1963
Typhoid fever breaks out among the wagons. Carolyn Kearney in the title role, Arthur Franz guest stars, Byron Foulger.
215	26	"The Michael McGoo Story"	Jerry Hopper	Norman Jolley	March 20, 1963
When four brothers are orphaned, no one on the train wants all four, except spinster Ada Meyers (Jocelyn Brando). Charlie Wooster himself had grown up as an orphan and believes Michael McGoo (John Doucette) looks promising as a father. Roger Mobley as the oldest Hooper orphan, Cathleen Cordell as Mrs. Lawson, Alice Backes as Carrie
216	27	"The Adam MacKenzie Story"	Virgil W. Vogel	Norman Jolley	March 27, 1963
Michael Ansara as doctor Adam MacKenzie who attempts to saves lives while bringing local villagers past their pagan beliefs. Esteban Perez (William Mims) refuses to abandon his old beliefs, but his wife Carlota Perez (Penny Santon) insists he believe in the wagon train doctor's ability to use medicine to heal. Peter Brown as Benedict O'Brien
217	28	"The Tom Tuesday Story"	Virgil W. Vogel	Leonard Praskins & Sloan Nibley	April 3, 1963
An unknown seismic event has created a mountain with a wild river where a pass used to be. Duke is forced by outlaw Tom Tuesday (Brian Keith) to act as his guide to an important rendezvous in Ruby City, Idaho.
218	29	"Heather and Hamish"	Allen H. Miner	Allen H. Miner	April 10, 1963
Heather MacIntosh (Anne Helm) talks to animals. Her father Samuel (Liam Redmond) hopes to marry her to Hamish Browne (Michael Parks).
219	30	"The Blane Wessels Story"	Jerry Hopper	John McGreevey	April 17, 1963
Blane Wessels (Robert Colbert) blames himself for the death of his wife a few months prior, and has a fatalistic attitude toward life. He joins with Duke and three women who are under attack by Cheyenne Indians. Virginia Christine guest stars
220	31	"The Tom O'Neal Story"	Virgil W. Vogel	John Kneubuhl	April 24, 1963
Young sweethearts Tom O'Neal (Peter Helm) and Ellen Howard (Brenda Scott) try to elope. Les Tremayne (Dr. Howard) guest stars
221	32	"The Clarence Mullins Story"	Jerry Hopper	Norman Jolley	May 1, 1963
Dishonorably discharged from the military for refusing to massacre a tribe of Modoc people, Christian preacher Clarence Mullins (Clu Gulager) is successful in his ministry to the Modocs. His next goal is to bring peace between the Army and the Modocs. Duke Shannon (Denny Miller) wants to find Mullins.
222	33	"The David Garner Story"	Virgil W. Vogel	Norman Jolley	May 8, 1963
Vernon Orton (Harry Harvey Sr.) asks Hale to deliver $8,000 to a bank. But David Garner (Randy Boone) and his girlfriend Susan (Susan Silo) might have other plans. An unscrupulous character (Peter Whitney) means to steal it. Susan is asked by Chris Hale, Duke Shannon and Charlie Wooster why they want to join the wagon train. Chris Hale offers to try and find David a job in Sacramento when they get that far. David comes to realize he loves Susan as much as she loves him.
223	34	"Alias Bill Hawks"	Jerry Hopper	Norman Jolley	May 15, 1963
Hawks receives a letter from an old Civil War friend, a native American (Indian), asking Hawks to lend him some help at his ranch land. It appears that Hawks has arrived too late, being told that his friend has died. Local residents have usurped the man's property in a desperate search for water. Hawks has his doubts that his frield is really dead. Jeanne Bal, Ed Nelson, Joan Freeman guest stars
224	35	"The Antone Rose Story"	Allen H. Miner	Allen H. Miner	May 22, 1963
Rancher Henry Ludlow (Trevor Bardette) believes his daughter Judy (Judi Meredith) is too good for sheep herder Antone Rose (Charles Knox Robinson). He whisks her off on the wagon train, but true love must prevail. They want to marry in spite of her father's objections.
225	36	"The Jim Whitlow Story"	William Witney	Steven Rich	May 29, 1963
Duke Shannon has a half-interest in "Shannon's Glen Ranch", along with his childhood friend Jim Whitlow (John Kerr) and Jim's wife Margaret (Ellen Burstyn). Foreman Clyde Hubble (Jim Davis) has been brutalizing the tenant farmers to create a financial empire for himself.
226	37	"The Barnaby West Story"	Virgil W. Vogel	Norman Jolley	June 5, 1963
Michael Burns joins the Wagon Train series, as a young man named Barnaby West Jr. Stu Erwin guest stars as the boy's father Barnaby West, Sr. Beginning in Virginia, Barnaby Jr. has journeyed on foot, hoping to find his father whom he has never met. According to Barnaby, his father is a legendary frontiersman. Some on the wagon train believe the boy's story comes out of a cheap novel he has been seen reading. In the end, Barnaby Jr. makes a choice between staying with his birth father, or continuing on with Bill Hawks on the wagon train.

=== Season 7 (1963–64) ===
All episodes in color and run for 90 minutes.

No. overall	No. in season	Title	Directed by	Written by	Original release date
227	1	"The Molly Kincaid Story"	Virgil W. Vogel	Gene L. Coon	September 16, 1963
After leaving St. Joseph, Missouri, Hale tells everyone there are no problems to worry about. However, Rome (Fabian Forte) and Molly Kincaid (Carolyn Jones) have stolen horses and shown up at the wagon train's first stop. Molly wants to kill her own husband Robert Kincaid (Ray Danton). The town's boss lady Kate Crawley (Barbara Stanwyck) is holding up their supplies to keep the wagon train in town. Notes: The series is moved to Mondays until April 1964 when the show moved to Sundays for its final season.
228	2	"The Fort Pierce Story"	William Witney	John McGreevey	September 23, 1963
The wagon train is reaching Fort Pierce, and everyone is looking forward to some downtime and celebrations. Chris Hale is anxious to spend time with his old friends Captain Paul Winters (Ronald Reagan) and his wife Nancy (Ann Blyth). Many of Halel's friends are at the fort. Colonel Lathrop (John Doucette) denies Chris Hale's request for a military escort for the wagon train as it travels through hostile Indian territory when it leaves Fort Pierce. Captain Winters is prepared to send his wife Nancy with Hale on the train. The Winders had a child that did not live long. She worries about her husband's safety.
229	3	"The Gus Morgan Story"	Virgil W. Vogel	Norman Jolley	September 30, 1963
Guided by Chris Hale, self-made railroad owner Gus Morgan (Peter Falk) wants to tunnel his rail line through a mountain. His younger college-educated brother Ethan (Tommy Sands) searches for an alternate path up and around the peak. Chris Hale. More experienced in the areas than either of them. Ethan's misfires, and Hale is accidentally wounded. The three men are caught in a blizzard, and their horses run away.
230	4	"The Widow O'Rourke Story"	Joseph Pevney	Leonard Praskins, Sloan Nibley	October 7, 1963
Duke and Charlie are taken prisoner and made slave labor by servants of widowed Chinese empire Princess Mei Ling (Carol Lawrence). She also believes Coop is the spitting image of her late Irish sea Captain husband, She makes him an offer, to take her niece as his wife and inherit all of her riches. Coop has to figure out a way to free Duke, Charlie, and the other slaves even though he is coming to admire the princess.
231	5	"The Robert Harrison Clarke Story"	William Witney	Gene L. Coon	October 14, 1963
Chris and Cooper, along with British journalist Robert Harrison Clarke (Michael Rennie), accompany civilian land surveyors working for the military. They discover a massacred Army. Two survivors enlighten the journalist's perception of America. Brian Keith guest stars
232	6	"The Myra Marshall Story"	Joseph Pevney	Peter Germano	October 21, 1963
Grace Marshall (Beverley Owen) and her sister Myra (Suzanne Pleshette) were raised by Rev. Philip Marshall, repudiated to be strict and abusive. Grace asks Coop to rescue Myra.
233	7	"The Sam Spicer Story"	R. G. Springsteen	Norman Jolley	October 28, 1963
After witnessing a bank holdup, young Barnaby West is taken hostage by outlaws Sam Spicer (Clu Gulager) and Reno Sutton (Ed Begley). Sam takes a liking to the boy as he reminds him of himself when Reno first made him a partner. Reno doesn't share that trust.
234	8	"The Sam Pulaski Story"	Allen H. Miner	Allen H. Miner	November 4, 1963
Coop is attracted to Rose Pulaski (Annette Funicello), whose brother Sam (Ross Martin) is a gang leader in Hell's Kitchen in Brooklyn. Sam previously had Coop beaten and robbed.
235	9	"The Eli Bancroft Story"	R. G. Springsteen	Steven Ritch	November 11, 1963
Eli Bancroft (Leif Erickson) and his entire family have a grudge against people who isolated then due to his wife's sickness. She ultimately died. He and his sons seek revenge. Randy Boone guest stars
236	10	"The Kitty Pryer Story"	Allen H. Miner	Allen H. Miner	November 18, 1963
Newlywed Kitty Pryer (Diana Hyland) discovers she is in a bigamous marriage. Her husband Victor Harp (Don Durant) will not divorce his current wife Martha (Jeanne Cooper) because she is a very wealthy woman. Victor hires incarcerated attorney Miles Brisbane (Bradford Dillman) to pretend to be Kitty's husband so they can all join the wagon train to San Francisco.
237	11	"The Sandra Cummings Story"	Virgil W. Vogel	Norman Jolley	December 2, 1963
Sandra Cummings (Rhonda Fleming) is an escapee from a Confederate prison. Against her wishes, Cooper Smith takes an interest in her daughter Paula (Cynthia Pepper). John Archer guest stars
238	12	"The Bleecker Story"	William Witney	Ted Sherdeman	December 9, 1963
The Bleecker gang attempt to use the wagon train to rob a fort. Joan Blondell and Ed Nelson guest stars
239	13	"The Story of Cain"	Allen H. Miner	Allen H. Miner	December 16, 1963
While scouting, Coop discovers John Cain (Ron Hayes) near death after making a major gold strike. In gratitude, Cain decides to let the wagon train share. Cain later reneges. Anne Helm appears as his wife Ruth Cain.
240	14	"The Cassie Vance Story"	Joseph Pevney	Betty Andrews	December 23, 1963
Cassie Vance (Laraine Day) is accused of theft by to a woman on the train that she nursed. Bert Jenkins (John Harmon) has also been robbed of all his money. Cassie had once served time in prison for theft, but says she is not the thief this time. A thorough search of all the wagons turns up nothing. Richard Carlson is her husband Adam Vance.
241	15	"The Fenton Canaby Story"	Joseph Pevney	Thomas Thompson	December 30, 1963
Fenton Canaby is alleged to have led a wagon train to disaster in the desert. Canaby never defended himself. When wagon master Christopher Hale makes the same crossing, he had the same issues. Jack Kelly and Barbara Bain guest stars
242	16	"The Michael Malone Story"	Virgil W. Vogel	Gerry Day, David Richards	January 6, 1964
Julie Holland (Joyce Bulifant) is attracted to Michael Malone (Michael Parks). He is in mourning over his dead sister. Beth Mitchell's husband Ben is a priest, but no one knows it.
243	17	"The Jed Whitmore Story"	Virgil W. Vogel	Teddi Sherman	January 13, 1964
The three Whitmore brothers - Ernie (Michael Ross), Jed and Harry (Karl Swenson) - commit a train robbery. Ernie is killed. Harry is caught spending the money and gets 20 years in prison. Newspaper man William Carr says his paper has put out a $10,000 reward for Jeb's whereabouts. Jed changes his name to Frank Lewis and becomes a Sheriff.
244	18	"The Geneva Balfour Story"	Sutton Roley	Ken Trevey	January 20, 1964
An Army closure of the usual trail now requires the train to take a desert route. With no other route to choose, Chris Hale loads up on extra supplies. Judge Arthur Forbes (Robert Lansing) questions Hale's decisions, as do others. Geneva Balfour (Sherry Jackson) ignites a fire in hopes she and her husband Aaron Peter Brown will turn around and head east. A fort Hale looked to for shelter, is already closed. Byron Foulger and Kathleen Freeman guest stars
245	19	"The Kate Crawley Story"	Virgil W. Vogel	Norman Jolley	January 27, 1964
Independent freight line operator Kate Crawley (Barbara Stanwyck) and Christopher Hale are attracted to each other. Stump Beasley (Noah Beery Jr.) has his own sights focused on marrying Kate Crawley.
246	20	"The Grover Allen Story"	Joseph Pevney	Jack Curtis	February 3, 1964
After 40 years working in a clock factory, Grover Allen (Burgess Meredith) is fired for being late and daydreaming. He sets off a bomb which kills his boss. Grover's son died at the Battle of Gettysburg. His daughter-in-law and grandson join the wagon train with him.
247	21	"The Andrew Elliott Story"	Herschel Daugherty	John Kneubuhl	February 10, 1964
Duke Shannon is arrested and charged with criminal negligence, being the only survivor of an expedition into the badlands. The investigation is being headed by Senator Harold Elliott (Everett Sloane) and Major Ogden (Alfred Ryder). He must retrace his steps with the Army and one of the victim's father.
248	22	"The Melanie Craig Story"	Joseph Pevney	John McGreevey	February 17, 1964
When Melanie Craig (Myrna Fahey) is widowed in a wagon accident, she enjoys life as she believes her husband would have wanted her to. There is no shortage of men who want to court her. Jim Davis guest stars
249	23	"The Pearlie Garnet Story"	Herschel Daugherty	Leonard Praskins	February 24, 1964
Pearlie Garnet (Sharon Farrell) is the prime suspect when a large sum of money goes missing. Marilyn Maxwell and Hugh Beaumont guest stars
250	24	"The Trace McCloud Story"	Virgil W. Vogel	John McGreevey	March 2, 1964
A murderer is on the loose in the town of Bedrock. Marshal Trace McCloud (Larry Pennell) has been unsuccessful in capturing the killer. When most of the population joins the wagon train, so does the killer. Audrey Dalton guest stars
251	25	"The Duncan McIvor Story"	Herschel Daugherty	Norman Jolley	March 9, 1964
Duke and Bill are captured by Indians and rescued by Army lieutenant Duncan McIvor (Ron Hayes). After he joins the train as far as for Fort Chacon, McIvor offers stolen Army supplies in return. Joanna Moore and Mike Mazurki guest stars
252	26	"The Ben Engel Story"	Joseph Pevney	Betty Andrews	March 16, 1964
Ben Engel (John Doucette) and his employee Harry Diel (Clu Gulager) are moving the Engle store to the west. During the Civil War, Engle paid Diel to take his place. Diel was subsequently decorated as a war hero.
253	27	"The Whipping"	Virgil W. Vogel	Leonard Praskins	March 23, 1964
Christopher Hale is out buying supplies. In his absence, Barnaby West (Michael Burns) and his friends get carried away with pranks. They remove a wheel nut on a wagon belonging to Marcey Jones (Martin Balsam). Bill Hawks orders Barnaby and his friends to make the repairs to that wagon. Barnaby runs away and breaks his leg.
254	28	"The Santiago Quesada Story"	Virgil W. Vogel	Gerry Day	March 30, 1964
Having completed her east-coast education, Kim Case (Jena Engstrom) is returning home during Indian wars. Her parents have long-since died. She longs to see her boyfriend Lance Starbuck (Perry Lopez). Although of native American ancestry, he was raised by Army Major Starbuck (Edward Binns). Comanche Quanah Parker leads a group in retaliation for massacres led by Santiago Quesada.
255	29	"The Stark Bluff Story"	Allen H. Miner	Allen H. Miner	April 6, 1964
At the town of Stark Bluff, Duke stops by to visit an old friend, only to find that friend is now dead. His widow is forced to work for Zeb Stark (Ray Danton), who is ruthless in his intimidation of everyone, including elected officials. Hari Rhodes guest stars
256	30	"The Link Cheney Story"	Joseph Pevney	John McGreevey	April 13, 1964
Coop joins a town poker game that includes gambler Link Cheney (Charles Drake). Link is stabbed by another player who thought he cheated. Coop brings him back to the train to heal. Dorthea Gillford (Pippa Scott) goes with them, and falls in love with Cheney.
257	31	"The Zebedee Titus Story"	Virgil W. Vogel	Norman Jolley	April 20, 1964
Barnaby and Charlie talk Chris Hale into hiring 80-year-old mountain man Zebedee Titus (Neville Brand) as a wagon scout. A legend in his own time, Titlus is now old, slow and fails to see Comanche smoke signals that lead to the capture of Cooper Smith.
258	32	"The Last Circle Up"	Allen H. Miner	Allen H. Miner	April 27, 1964
As they approach Sacramento, California, the families and the train crew reminisce about their long journey, and prepare to separate. Joe De Santis and Naomi Stevens guest stars

=== Season 8 (1964–65) ===
The final season reverts to black-and-white and runs for 60 minutes.

No. overall	No. in season	Title	Directed by	Written by	Original release date
259	1	"The Bob Stuart Story"	Virgil W. Vogel	Calvin Clements	September 20, 1964
Wagon train scout Cooper Smith (Robert Fuller) was once shot in the back by retired Marshal Bob Stuart (Robert Ryan). Cooper must now escort Stuart and his wife Janice (Vera Miles) to the train. Thomas Lance (Will Smith) and his younger brother Keith (Tommy Sands) are also on the train. They, too, seek revenge for a brain injury inflicted by Stuart.
260	2	"The Hide Hunters"	Virgil W. Vogel	John McGreevey	September 27, 1964
Gyb Ryker (Chris Robinson) is a hunter who kills the buffalo just for their hides. He continually antagonizes Barnaby just for the fun of it. Morgan Woodward and Charla Doherty guest star.
261	3	"The John Gillman Story"	Joseph Pevney	Calvin Clements	October 4, 1964
John Gillman (Bobby Darin) is a bitter man, wounded and on the run from the law. He is discovered by orphan Abigail (Betsy Hale) who has been rejected by potential adoptive parents. Gillman and Abigal begin to form a bond. Virginia Gregg also guest stars as Miss Roberts.
262	4	"The Race Town Story"	Joseph Pevney	Calvin Clements	October 11, 1964
Believing Annabelle Day (Cheryl Holdridge) from the train has been hired as a singer by Sam Race (Dan Duryea) in his tent city, Barnaby West (Michael Burns) feels protective of her when he realizes she is just a saloon girl. In turn, Bill Hawks wants to protect both of them.
263	5	"The Barbara Lindquist Story"	R. G. Springsteen	Meyer Dolinsky	October 18, 1964
Cooper Smith witnesses a stagecoach robbery. Barbara Lindquist (Dana Wynter) mistakes Coop for one of the robbers. Barry Atwater guest star
264	6	"The Brian Conlin Story"	Virgil W. Vogel	Frank Chase	October 25, 1964
Brian Conlin (Leslie Nielsen) is in charge of some Irish immigrants who were shunned elsewhere, and in need of help. Coop is willing to help, but the immigrants have been so badly treated by others, that they are wary of Coop. Paul Fix and Audrey Dalton guest star
265	7	"The Alice Whitetree Story"	Joseph Pevney	John Kneubuhl	November 1, 1964
Alice Whitetree (Diane Baker) is the sole survivor of a tribe that was massacred ten years earlier. Coop, who rescued her, falls in love. As Coop hears varied stories from others about her background, he tries to find out if there is any truth in what he is told. John Hoyt, Ken Lynch guest star
266	8	"Those Who Stay Behind"	Virgil W. Vogel	John McGreevey	November 8, 1964
The train has more applicants than available space. Among those is Ben Campbell (Peter Brown), an ex-convict who is the target of a former partner of his. Lola Albright, Jay North, Bruce Dern guest stars
267	9	"The Nancy Styles Story"	Joseph Pevney	Norman Jolley	November 22, 1964
Christopher Hale plans to detour the wagon train around Denver because of inclement early snow. Nancy Styles (Deborah Walley) the daughter of the Western Trails Company owner, believes she can order Christopher Hale to do what she wants. Hale refuses her request. Ryan O'Neal, Marilyn Wayne guest star
268	10	"The Richard Bloodgood Story"	Joseph Pevney	Leonard Praskins	November 29, 1964
Coop's boyhood friend Richard Bloodgood (Guy Stockwell), now blind, aims to kill Coop because of a woman they knew long ago. Reta Shaw and singer Glenn Yarbrough guest star.
269	11	"The Clay Shelby Story"	R. G. Springsteen	Peter Germano	December 6, 1964
Clay Shelby (Dwayne Hickman), a Civil War deserter, and his pregnant wife are on the train. Comanches are possibly gathering to attack the train. Richard Carlson guest stars.
270	12	"Little Girl Lost"	Virgil W. Vogel	Leonard Praskins	December 13, 1964
A little girl believed to be a ghost from the Donner Party appears to Charlie Wooster each night. Charlie thinks he might be losing his mind. Lisa Eilbacher, John Doucette guest star
271	13	"The Hector Heatherton Story"	Allen H. Miner	Allen H. Miner	December 20, 1964
Charlie Wooster believes that somewhere in the future, mankind will fly. Of that belief, Charlie has found a kindred sole in wagon train passenger Hector Heatherton (Tom Ewell). Jeanne Cooper and Kim Darby guest star
272	14	"The Echo Pass Story"	Joseph Pevney	Calvin Clements	January 3, 1965
Scouting for water, Coop is shot and taken hostage by a gang. Jack Lord, Susan Seaforth Hayes, James Caan, Diane Brewster guest star
273	15	"The Chottsie Gubenheimer Story"	Joseph Pevney	John McGreevey	January 10, 1965
Hale asks his former girlfriend Chottsie Gubenheimer (Jeanette Nolan) to join the wagon train.
274	16	"The Wanda Snow Story"	Joseph Pevney	Earl Hamner	January 17, 1965
Wanda Snow (Marta Kristen) is believed to be clairvoyant. There are those who would like to usurp her gift for their own advantage. Arthur O'Connell, Dabbs Greer guest star
275	17	"The Isaiah Quickfox Story"	Virgil W. Vogel	John Kneubuhl	January 31, 1965
While searching for a legendary hidden fortune, Prof. Sheffield (John Holland) disappears near a cave. Native American Isaiah Quickfox (Frank DeKova) leads a rescue team to find the missing processor.
276	18	"Herman"	Joseph Pevney	Ted Sherdeman and Jane Klove	February 14, 1965
Herman is a 3,000-pound Belgian horse belonging to Jamison Hershey (Charlie Ruggles). The local Indians are in awe of Herman. Linda Evans and Tim McIntire guest star
277	19	"The Bonnie Brooke Story"	Allen H. Miner	Allen H. Miner	February 21, 1965
Pregnant Bonnie Brooke (Katharine Ross) requires medical attention, but she and her school teacher husband Don (James Davidson) have no money to pay for a docctor.
278	20	"The Miss Mary Lee McIntosh Story"	Virgil W. Vogel	Gerry Day	February 28, 1965
School teacher Mary Lee McIntosh (Bethel Leslie) intends to open a school. After her wagon is destroyed, she teams up with Daniel Delaney (Jack Warden). Jack Bighead and Eddie Little Sky guest star
279	21	"The Captain Sam Story"	Virgil W. Vogel	Gerry Day	March 21, 1965
Ferryboat captain Samantha Stewart (Cathy Lewis) accompanies her son Johnny Stewart to California. John War Eagle guest stars
280	22	"The Betsy Blee Smith Story"	Allen H. Miner	Allen H. Miner	March 28, 1965
Betsy Blee Smith (Jennifer Billingsley), identical twin of Eloise Blee, is married and pregnant, about to give birth. Her husband Calvin S. Brown (Jody McCrea) is nowhere to be found. Coop stops by to see the family, and ends up helping with the birth.
281	23	"The Katy Piper Story"	Joseph Pevney	Leonard Praskins and Stanley Dyrector	April 11, 1965
While escorting Dr. Katy Piper (Frances Reid), Barnaby West is forced to kill a bandit. When he learns the bandit was a mere boy, his conscience haunts him. Even though he was not injured, his gun hand bleeds non stop. Even worse, he is the one who must deliver the bad news to the boy's mother. The young man had a twin brother. The townspeople rise up against Barnaby West.
282	24	"The Indian Girl Story"	James H. Brown	Calvin Clements	April 18, 1965
Bill Hawks and Cooper Smith rescue an Indian girl (Leslie Perkins) from being brutally mistreated. John Lupton guest stars as Wingate. Ernest Borgnine (uncredited) as an Indian brave
283	25	"The Silver Lady"	Andrew V. McLaglen	Dick Nelson	April 25, 1965
A tale about the brothers Wyatt Earp (Don Collier), Virgil Earp (Don Galloway) and Morgan Earp (Michael Burns) and a woman who died surrounded by silver coins.
284	26	"The Jarbo Pierce Story"	William Witney	Calvin Clements	May 2, 1965
Charlie Wooster reminisces about his early years when he was employed by Jarbo Pierce (Rory Calhoun) at a trading post.
