= The Colter Craven Story =

- Wagon Train episode
- Episode no.: Season 4 Episode 9
- Directed by: John Ford
- Written by: Tony Paulson
- Cinematography by: Benjamin H. Kline A.S.C.
- Original air date: November 23, 1960

Guest appearances
- Carleton Young as Dr. Colter Craven; Anna Lee as Allaryce, Craven's wife; Paul Birch as Sam (General Grant); Ken Curtis as Kyle Cleatus; John Carradine as Park; Michael Morris* as General Sherman; *pseudonym for John Wayne

Episode chronology
← Previous "The Bleymier Story"	Next → "The Jane Hawkins Story"

"The Colter Craven Story" (spelled as The Coulter Craven Story in the episode but with the first name somehow winding up more commonly spelled as "Colter" in countless publications and references) is the November 23, 1960 black-and-white episode of the American television western series, Wagon Train, which had an eight-season run from 1957 to 1965. Presented as the 9th installment of the hour-long program's 4th season, it is the third of four episodes of various television series directed by filmmaker John Ford, the only four-time winner of the Academy Award for Best Director.

Cast with a collection of actors who repeatedly appeared in Ford's films and were known as the John Ford Stock Company, "The Colter Craven Story" was done as a favor to Wagon Train star Ward Bond, who played supporting roles in 24 Ford films (and in one TV episode, "Rookie of the Year"). Filmed in September 1960, it was broadcast 18 days after Bond's sudden death from a heart attack on November 5.

== Production notes ==
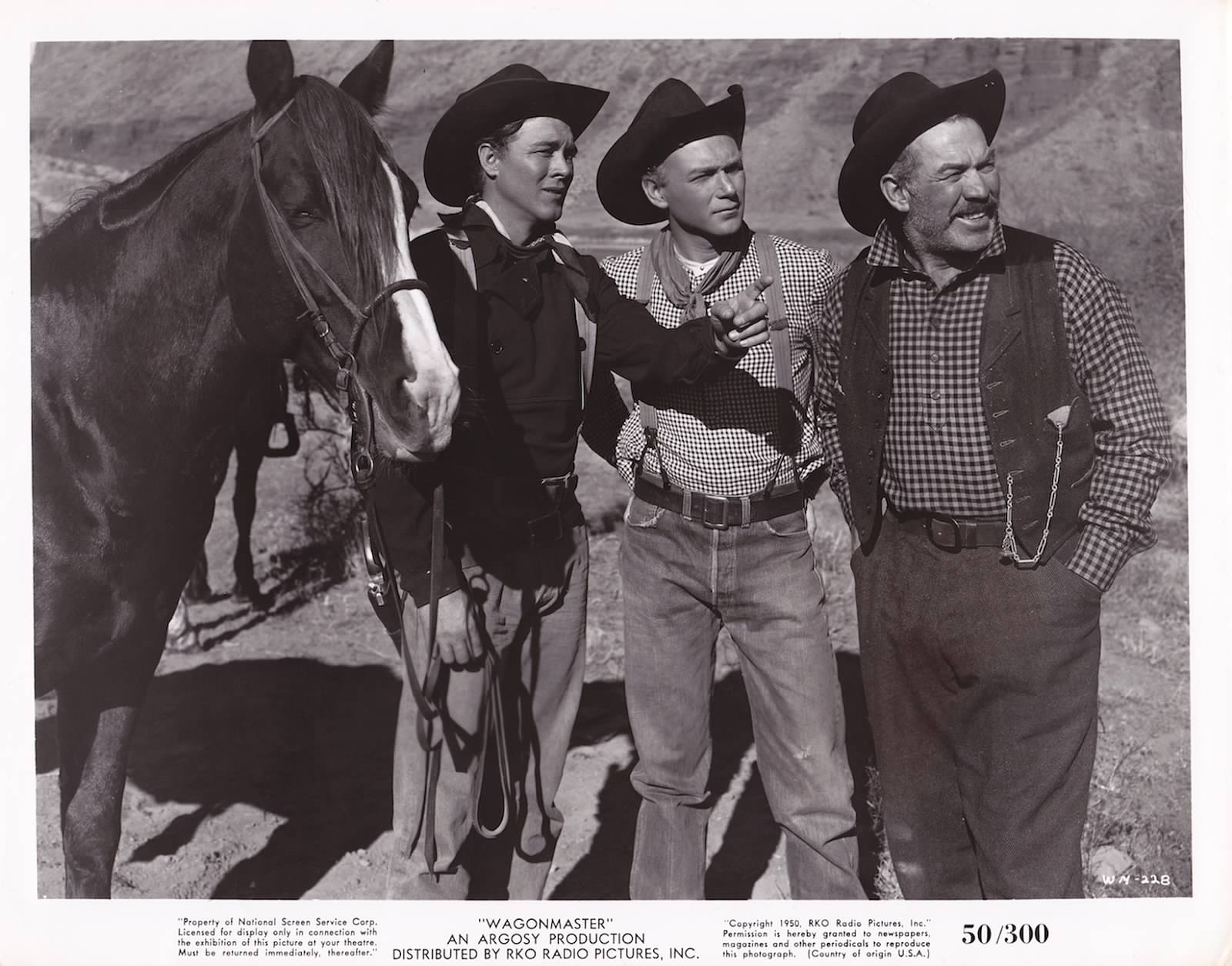
Ben Johnson, Harry Carey, Jr. and Ward Bond in John Ford's Wagon Master (1950), one of the primary cinematic inspirations for the Wagon Train series. John Ford dressed Ward Bond identically to this, with the black hat and checkered shirt, in the Wagon Train episode that Ford later directed titled "The Colter Craven Story" featuring many regulars from Ford films as well as some stock footage from Wagon Master.

Ford's previous TV episode, "Rookie of the Year", a December 1955 half-hour installment of the 1955–56 anthology series Screen Directors Playhouse, represents John Wayne's sole starring acting role on television, but Wayne made cameo appearances in "The Colter Craven Story" (as one of the key Union Army generals in the Civil War, William Tecumseh Sherman) and, two years later, in Ford's final TV episode, "Flashing Spikes", an October 1962 hour-long entry from another anthology, Alcoa Premiere, which aired from 1961 to 1963. The name seen in last place among the actors listed in the end credits of both episodes is "Michael Morris", a variation upon Marion Michael Morrison, which is the most frequently indicated form of Wayne's birth name.

The central plotline of "Rookie of the Year" concerns a baseball player (portrayed by Ward Bond) who, decades earlier, was accused of throwing a game, which is also the key theme in "Flashing Spikes", in which the disgraced middle-aged former player is portrayed by James Stewart, with Wayne playing a cigar-chewing Marine sergeant umpiring a soldiers' baseball game on the sidelines of the Korean War, whose recognizable voice and figure, rather than his face (partially obscured by a baseball cap), provides the instant identification. The honorable sports reporter played by Wayne in "Rookie of the Year" decides against exposing Bond as the father of a talented young "rookie" player portrayed by Wayne's 16-year-old actor son, Pat Wayne who, seven years later (listed by his most frequent billing, Patrick Wayne), again portrays a similarly-positioned young player in "Flashing Spikes", where the snide, baseball-hating opportunist columnist at the opposite end of morality from John Wayne's character in "Rookie of the Year", is portrayed by "Colter Craven" himself, Carleton Young who, between 1958 and 1964, appeared in 5 John Ford films (The Last Hurrah, The Horse Soldiers, Sergeant Rutledge, The Man Who Shot Liberty Valance and Cheyenne Autumn). All three TV episodes also feature another member of the Stock Company, Willis Bouchey, who was in 9 Ford theatrical features between 1955 and 1964.

In early 1962, about a year-and-a-half after directing "The Colter Craven Story", John Ford recreated a longer version of the General Grant–General Sherman scene for "The Civil War", the third of five segments comprising the Metrocolor Cinerama epic, How the West Was Won (three of the lengthy production's other storyline sections were directed by Henry Hathaway and one by George Marshall). The film, which held its initial public exhibition in Britain on November 1, 1962 (the US premiere was in February 1963), presented the scene in Cinerama's ultra-wide-screen perspective, but Ford still staged it in its 1960 television form, with extended dialogue content between Grant [played in How the West Was Won by Henry (Harry) Morgan, and in "The Colter Craven Story" by Paul Birch, who had previously portrayed both Ulysses S. Grant and his Confederate counterpart Robert E. Lee in episodes of other TV series] and Sherman (John Wayne), whose face is partially hidden in shadows throughout the conversation, in a manner reminiscent of its presentation in the TV episode. Wayne, whose scene with Morgan lasts just under four minutes, receives 12th billing among the 13 alphabetically-billed top-tier stars of How the West Was Won and is again recognized more through his posture and distinctive vocal delivery, than by the indistinct sight of his unshaven face, mirroring his "Michael Morris" one-line performance as Sherman in "The Colter Craven Story". Although the film is occasionally listed as the sixth Carleton Young big screen performance under Ford's direction, Young's brief unbilled appearance (as a poker player with Gregory Peck) is in the second segment, "The Plains", directed by Henry Hathaway.

== Plot ==
=== Doctor Colter Craven joins the wagon train ===
As Major Adams (Ward Bond) leads his wagon train through Utah's Monument Valley (using footage from Ford's 1950 frontier adventure/western Wagon Master, which co-starred Bond), the trail cook, Charlie Wooster (Frank McGrath) informs the Major that the water supply is running low. At that point, the trail associate scout, Bill Hawks (Terry Wilson), rides up with news that he spotted smoke "three miles up ahead". When the Major asks him, "Fort Mescalero?" and then, "Think it's Apaches?", Hawks replies, "Well, Major, at thirty-two dollars a month, I ain't paid to think". The Major tells Hawks, "Hah, let's have a look. Come on".

The source of the smoke turns out to be cooking fire alongside a broken-wheeled lone horseless wagon stranded in the wilderness. In the wagon, the Major and Hawks encounter a semi-drunken gentleman who introduces himself as Colter Craven (Carleton Young) and calls for his wife, Allaryce (Anna Lee), who addresses him as "Doctor". He tells the Major that as far as Fort Mescalero was concerned, "I'm wanted out of there" and adds, "Major, if we may join your train… in return for... our transportation... I can offer a compendium of my… medical services". He then continues, "Major, the only thing that really lies ahead is… tomorrow. And tomorrow comes regardless of which way we're headin'".

=== Doctor Craven is unable to offer medical aid for a passenger expecting a difficult birth ===
During an evening rest stop, Doctor Craven hears from Major Adams that the wagon train is still intent upon heading to Fort Mescalero and explains that he cannot return there because he had refused to remove an inoperable bullet from Buck Clayton — "the Claytons run this part of the world". At that point, Creel Weatherby (Cliff Lyons), whose wife is expected to give birth soon, runs to the Major for help. The Major heads to the doctor, but he protests that "in a party this large, there must be at least fifty midwives". When Creel insists, Craven turns to his wife to ask if she would mind "going with this gentleman and looking at his wife". Taking full measure of the doctor's alcoholism, Major Adams then tells him that "among other things, we don't allow whisky on this train, except that which is used for medicinal purposes — and that we carry on my wagon". Spotting the doctor's supply of kegs marked "XXX", the Major asks, "what's in these kegs?". The doctor replies, "why… ah… uh… that's… uh… Formaldehyde, sir". The Major says, "I want to see the heads of those kegs knocked in. On this train we don't have any use for… Formaldehyde".

=== Inhospitable reception in Fort Mescalero ===
In another scene from Wagon Master, which detailed a westward trek by a Mormon wagon train, men and women in Mormon garb are seen walking and riding through Monument Valley. The doctor and his wife are riding in the back of the Major's wagon, driven by Charlie. During the ride, the doctor reaches behind him to fill a cup from the "medicinal supply" barrel and shares a drink with Charlie. Upon arriving in Fort Mescalero, the Major tells Craven and his wife to "stay out of sight" and dips a bucket into the water trough. He is observed by Kyle (Ken Curtis) and his brother Quentin (Chuck Hayward) who shoots into the bucket. As the outraged Major demands an explanation, Kyle tells him that this is "our water" and Quentin calls him "Grandpa". The Major angrily exclaims, "Grandpa!", hits Quentin over the head with the bucket and slaps Kyle to the ground with the back of his hand. Chastened, Kyle tells him that "all this water belongs to us".... "my pa…" The Major says, "Well then, shoulder up your sidekick and we'll go see your pa". As Quentin, holding his aching head, attempts to stand up, the Major kicks him in the posterior and shouts, "Come on, get up, there!" Reduced to helplessness, Kyle whines accusingly at the Major, "big bully".

=== Major Adams bargains for water, Craven sets a boy's broken leg and the river is reached ===
The Major, alongside the two humbled brothers, with Kyle holding up the unsteady Quentin, enters into a room where their aristocratically-mannered father, Park (John Carradine), wearing a dandified jacket atop a shirt with ruffled sleeves, is sitting on a throne-like chair at a heavily ornate table, building a house of cards, next to a mid-game chessboard. Slowly interrupting his task, he leans back and comments, "That's a most interesting tableau". The Major says, "I'm sorry I had to push your boys around out there, mister, but they were gettin' rambunctious". "My boys are simple enough without somebody hitting them on the head", replies Park. He subsequently offers to sell water at 25 dollars per barrel. "That's piracy", the Major shouts, offering a dime, maybe even 20 cents, stating "that water belongs to the Lord". Park is unmoved and responds, "the Lord didn't dig the wells — I did", but eventually an unspecified [the majority of scenes from the Fort Mescalero sequence were edited out] arrangement is reached allowing animals to be watered "at ten cents a head". The Major is forced to leave the fort without water, hoping to reach the nearest river before the trail's meager supply is gone. In the evening, as the wagons are stopped, an injured little boy, Jamie (Dennis Rush) is brought to Doctor Craven. With the boy's worried mother (Beula Blaze) watching, Craven skillfully diagnoses a broken leg and quickly sets it with splints.

Bill Hawks suggests letting the thirsty horses loose and, as they stampede to the nearest river (in still another scene from Wagon Master), Bill follows them and is able to pinpoint the shortest, but hilly and barely passable, route to water. Footage of Mormon travelers is shown, as they walk alongside their wagons in Monument Valley. The terrain is very rough and the Major's wagon crashes and breaks apart. Extended excerpts from Wagon Master show the wagons moving through uneven rocky pathways, while horses are whipped and men are shouting. Finally, the river is reached and the Mormons drink and splash while their horses stand in water. The Major tells Charlie that the subject of his Sunday sermon will be "Cleanliness is next to Godliness" and pushes him off his horse into the river.

=== Doctor Craven explains that the Civil War left him a broken man ===
In the evening, Creel runs to inform Craven that his wife is ready to give birth. The doctor asks, "can't some of the women handle this?", but Allaryce tells him, "I've examined the woman. A caesarian section is indicated". Craven refuses to operate, even when Allaryce threatens to leave him if he does not help. As Major Adams tries to reason with him, Craven recounts that he could never perform proper surgery and that he paid for medical school with a job at a slaughterhouse. He tells the Major, "I graduated just in time for the war… Shiloh… eighteen thousand casualties… in that one campaign, seventy-two percent of my patients died…" The Major tells him, "…shock and gangrene… that wasn't your fault…" and continues, "…who do you think you are to sit in judgment of yourself?… what makes you think that you ought to be infallible?… what right have you got to make yourself personally responsible for the war?… I was at Shiloh… I had two hundred and twenty-three men… every one of them friends and neighbors… I came out with seventeen…"

=== Major Adams tells Doctor Craven about his own Civil War experiences ===
The Major has Charlie serve coffee, tells the doctor to sit down and says, "Let me tell you about a fella that I knew once, fella tried to solve his problem the same way you're tryin' to solve yours… He was in the Army… Captain… resigned his commission six years before the war…" The scene dissolves into a view of a Mississippi steamboat. The Major's voice continues, "I was in a little town in Illinois — Galena"... Bill Hawks and I had a little lumber outfit..." They see a man (Paul Birch), who Adams greets as Sam. Sam tells him, "I just came home, that's all". When Adams offers to buy him a drink later, Sam says, "Seth... I guess you came to the right man with that offer". He then goes to a woman waiting for him with two children. He embraces her and then the children. Two nosy townsmen, Hank (unbilled Hank Worden) and Jeb (unbilled Charles Seel) approach and tell Adams that "ol' Sam… got hisself kicked out of the Army… folks say he was doing' a little too much drinkin'… a regular drunk…" With a disgusted expression on his face, Adams responds that although he doesn't believe it, "folks say" that Jeb's "poor ol' ma died in a workhouse" and that Hank's young sister is "workin' in a dancehall down in St. Louis", which makes the two gossipers scurry away.

Sam's father (Willis Bouchey) and mother (unbilled Mae Marsh, who appeared in 17 Ford films between 1939 and 1964 — more than any other actress) sternly accept his return, with the father offering Sam a job in his tanning store, telling him, "...even though you are a failure…" A few years pass... Bill Hawks goes into Sam's father's tanning store and asks Sam the price of a saddle. Sam tells him the saddle is worth about fourteen dollars, but "we're asking thirty-two fifty for it". Sam's father appears, pushes Sam aside and offers to sell it for forty dollars, then thirty-eight, then thirty-six. As Bill leaves without buying, Sam follows him outside and sees Adams drilling volunteer soldiers for the war that is expected to start soon.

Walking into a local establishment's drinking area, Adams sees Sam at the bar and tells him that training raw recruits is a thankless task. Sam asks, "What's your rank, Seth?". "Sergeant major, Sam", Adams answers. Sam tells him, "You can lick boys, Seth, but you've got to lead men". Adams invites Sam to do a better job of training the raw recruits and Sam accepts. He stops drinking and, still wearing his tanner's apron, goes out and tells Adams to "take your post" in line with the men. He asks a man in uniform who has a big, wide smile on his face (unbilled Jack Pennick, who appeared in 41 Ford films [between 1928 and 1962], the highest number of any member of the Company), "Is that you Tim Molloy?". "Yes, sir", answers Molloy. Sam mentions how they served together in "Mexico, Chapultepec" and tells the men to observe how "to execute the manual of arms" as he puts Malloy through his paces and, over Adams's objections, tells him, "Molloy, you are now acting first sergeant". As the men march through the streets of Galena, Adams' voice is heard narrating, "In about a month, Sam had just worked wonders with that bunch of bedraggled misfits…heh…heh… they were ready for anything… and it was just in time, too, cause the Rebs had fired on Fort Sumter… and the Civil War was on".

=== Sam turns out to be a historical figure ===
Seen wearing a resplendent uniform, with a sword, Adams continues with his voiceover, describing how Galena residents organized a send-off ceremony, "I was a proud man that day standing' on that platform, sayin' goodbye to our congressman, the mayor and his wife and our friends and neighbors". Sam is also there and tells Adams, "I'm going with you as far as Springfield… I got a job in the governor's office… clerk… sharpening lead pencils…" As Adams prepares to lead his men out, Sam glances at the crowd, which includes his father and mother whose stern expressions still express disapproval, and embraces his little son and daughter. To his wife's question, "You aren't discouraged?", he replies, "no", and when she adds, "You'll be home soon", he says, "I'll be back". As the uniformed group marches towards the riverboat to the tune of "When Johnny Comes Marching Home", Sam joins them as the last marcher.

Accompanied by an image of a night battlefield, Adams' voice is heard proceeding with the story, "I didn't run across Sam again until just after Shiloh [April 6–7, 1862]… one of the worst days in American history… over thirty thousand casualties… that first night I was out lookin' for my wounded…" Adams meets Sam on the battlefield and lights Sam's cigar, illuminating his face. Sam tells Adams, "they run out of lead pencils… I managed to wangle my way back into the Army". As Adams asks Sam to take the second lieutenant's job held by Tim Molloy who was killed that day, Sam grimly replies, "I don't know, Seth… after today I'm not so sure I'm qualified to be a second lieutenant". As Adams persists, three uniformed men, indistinctly seen in darkness, arrive on horseback, with one of them dismounting and stating (in John Wayne's familiar voice), "Sam, Buell's up… Means we can resume fighting' in the mornin'". As "Battle Cry of Freedom" is gently heard on the soundtrack, Sam says, "Yes, we can resume in the morning… Cump... Colonel Lawler... I'd like you to meet a fellow townsman of mine, Major Seth Adams… General Sherman…" "Sam", Adams abashedly interjects, "I'm just a lieutenant". "Battlefield promotion, Seth", Sam says softly, "you've earned it… let's go, Cump… God bless you, Seth".

=== Major Adams' Civil War experiences help Doctor Craven to confront his own demons ===
"Ulysses Simpson Grant, Sam Grant", Adams' voice is heard, as he is now seen telling Doctor Craven the finishing words of his reminiscence concerning General Grant and the nickname he was known to his friends by, and, "and now he's the President of these United States of America [served March 1869 – March 1877]… he had a lot more responsibility than you doc… he used that responsibility… to redeem himself…" Craven is still unable to terms with his emotional disarray and grasping a scalpel in his fist, pitifully demands of Adams, "What am I going to do with a hand that can only hold a knife that way?" Adams stares angrily at him and replies, "You can cut your throat", then rises and walks aside. Craven's hand opens and is finally able to properly grasp the scalpel he was holding. He calls for his wife who tells him, "Colter, your patient is waitin'".

Another scene from Wagon Master depicts numerous people, horses and wagons moving through Monument Valley and then, during a rest stop, Creel distributes cigars to the Major, Charlie, Bill and Doctor Craven, telling him that although he planned to name his newborn son after Robert E. Lee, "Myra and I would like your permission to name 'im after you". Craven thanks him, "but I would prefer that you name him after a very special hero of mine, Ulysses Simpson Grant". "Why, that's a Yankee name", shouts Creel but, with Adams, Charlie, and Bill glaring sternly at him, quickly warms up to the idea. As Charlie grabs all the remaining cigars, the Major yells at him and then turns on Bill, "and what do you get paid for?" "So you can yell at me", Bill shouts back into the Major's face. In ever-increasing close-up, the Major enthusiastically yells, "All right, everybody… let's get our teams hitched up… we pull outa here in fifteen minutes… come on, we gotta river to cross… Wagoooooooons hoooooooo…..". The final scene (taken, again, from Wagon Master) depicts wagons crossing a river in a Utah valley.

== Cast ==
- Starring Ward Bond ... Major Seth Adams
- with Frank McGrath ... Charlie Wooster
- Terry Wilson ... Bill Hawks
- Carleton Young ... Doctor Colter Craven
- Anna Lee ... Allaryce, Doctor Craven's wife
- Paul Birch ... Sam Grant
- Ken Curtis [John Ford's son-in-law] ... Kyle
- Cliff Lyons ... Creel Weatherby
- Chuck Hayward ... Quentin
- Dennis Rush ... Jamie
- Beula Blaze ... Jamie's mother
- Willis Bouchey ... Sam Grant's father
- and John Carradine as Park
- John Wayne as General Sherman (billed as Michael Morris)

=== Unbilled members of John Ford Stock Company (in order of appearance) ===
- Chuck Roberson ... Junior (edited from the final cut of the Fort Mescalero sequence)
- Charles Seel ... Jeb
- Hank Worden ... Hank
- Mae Marsh ... Sam Grant's mother
- Jack Pennick ... Drill Sergeant Tim Molloy
- Danny Borzage ... Soldier

Although not a member of the Stock Company, 1930s B-western star Kermit Maynard (look-alike younger brother of Ken Maynard, usually wrongly assumed to be his brother's twin), who made brief unbilled appearances in Ford's They Were Expendable (1945) and My Darling Clementine (1946), is also unbilled in "The Colter Craven Story", seen for a moment as a member of the wagon train.

== Eliminated scenes ==
Seventeen or eighteen minutes were edited out of the 72-minute cut delivered by Ford, thus accounting for the abrupt nature of some of the scenes, particularly the Fort Mescalero storyline, including the excision of Chuck Roberson's entire performance as "Junior", eldest son of the John Carradine character, "Park", whose own single scene is the only remaining segment of a more complex eliminated sequence revolving around Dr. Craven's earlier mention of his refusal/inability to provide treatment for the deadly bullet wound suffered by Park's son "Buck". Final resolution could not be agreed upon regarding suggestions that the extra footage be used to expand the episode into a two-part story.

== See also ==
- List of Wagon Train episodes
