= Montezuma's treasure =

Legendary buried treasure, the Americas

Montezuma's treasure is a legendary buried treasure said to be located in the Casa Grande ruins or elsewhere in the Southwestern United States and Mexico. The legend is one of many treasure stories in American folklore. Thomas Penfield wrote, "There is not the slimmest thread of reality in this story which is common throughout Mexico and the southwestern United States. There are some puzzling aspects but the story, nevertheless, adds up to pure legend."

== The legends ==
One story tells of the 1520 imprisonment of Montezuma II by Spanish conquistadors. With the conquistadors demanding a ransom in gold, runners were dispatched to warn tribes to hide their treasures. However, none of the histories of the conquest, such as The True History of the Conquest of New Spain by Bernal Díaz del Castillo, say that Montezuma was ever held for ransom by the conquistadors or that any people of the area were told to hide their treasure from the Spanish. A labyrinth found in modern times at the Casa Grande Ruins National Monument led to speculation that it might be home to some of the fabled treasure. Extensive excavation of the area, however, has turned up nothing to support the claim.

According to John Mitchell, in 1847, during the Mexican American War, a Mexican aristocrat named Don Joaquin enslaved the local Apaches to dig for gold in the Sierra Estrellas. But later, as the United States Army entered the mountains, the Apache rose up against the Mexicans who had to hide their gold in a canyon near Montezuma's Head. Most of the Mexicans were killed but at least one man survived and later went back to the mountains in the 1880s with a treasure map to find the gold. However, the Apache still controlled the area and the Mexican man never found the lost treasure.

Newspapers as far back as 1895 have published accounts of people who have claimed to have found this lost treasure.

== Television ==
The myth and superstitions about a curse on the treasure are sensationalized in a 2014 television program Raiders of the Lost Past which includes interviews of many family members of treasure hunters.

The treasure is the basis for an episode of Wagon Train entitled "The Alexander Portlass Story".

== See also ==
- Apache Wars
- Lost Dutchman's Gold Mine
