= Wagon Train =

American Western television series (1957–1965)

- Also known as: Major Adams, Trailmaster; Trailmaster
- Genre: Western
- Starring: Ward Bond; Robert Horton; John McIntire; Robert Fuller; Michael Burns; Frank McGrath; Terry Wilson; Scott Miller
- Theme music composer: Jack Brooks; Sammy Fain; Jerome Moross; John O'Neill vocalist; Henri René; Stanley Wilson
- Country of origin: United States
- Original language: English
- No. of seasons: 8
- No. of episodes: 284 (list of episodes)

Production
- Executive producers: Howard Christie; Richard Lewis
- Producers: Howard Christie; Richard Lewis; Frederick Shorr
- Running time: 60 minutes (1957–63; 1964–65); 90 minutes (1963–64)
- Production companies: Revue Studios (seasons 1–6); Universal Television (seasons 7–8)

Original release
- Network: NBC (1957–62); ABC (1962–65)
- Release: September 18, 1957 – May 2, 1965

Related
- Wagon Master; The Big Trail

Wagon Train is an American Western television series that aired for eight seasons, first on the NBC television network (1957–1962) and then on ABC (1962–1965). Wagon Train debuted on September 18, 1957, and reached the top of the Nielsen ratings. It is the fictional adventure story of a large westbound wagon train through the American frontier from Missouri to California. Its format attracted famous guest stars for each episode, appearing as travelers or residents of the settlements whom the regular cast encountered.

The show initially starred film actor Ward Bond as the wagon master (replaced after his death in 1960 by John McIntire) and Robert Horton as the scout (eventually replaced by Robert Fuller).

The series was inspired by the 1950 film Wagon Master and the 1930 early widescreen film The Big Trail, both featuring Bond. The series influenced the development of Star Trek, pitched as "Wagon Train to the stars" and launched in 1966.

== Overview ==
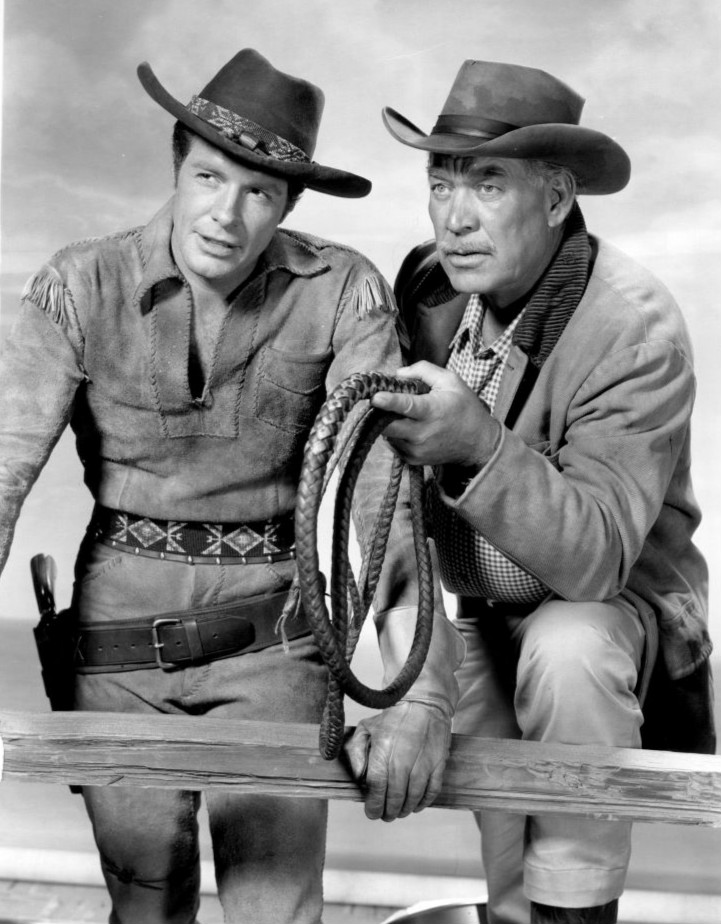
Robert Horton and Ward Bond

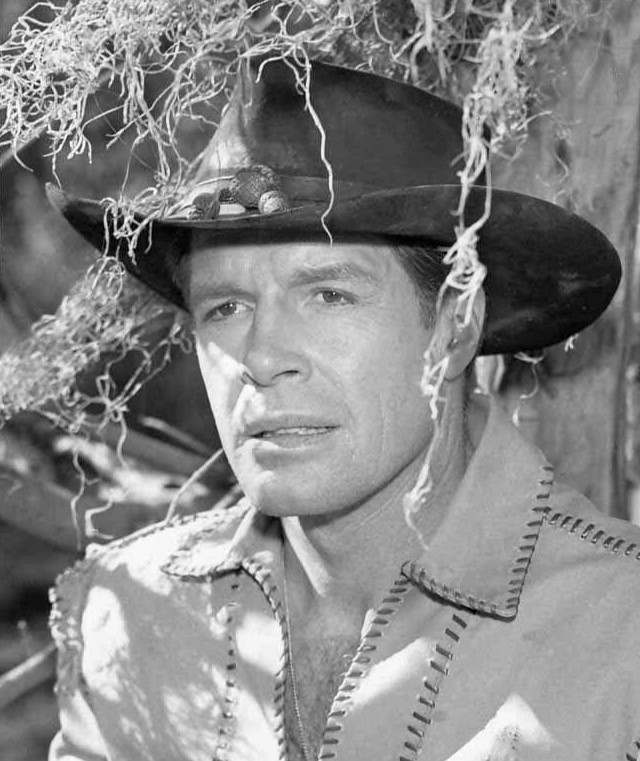
Robert Horton as Flint McCullough

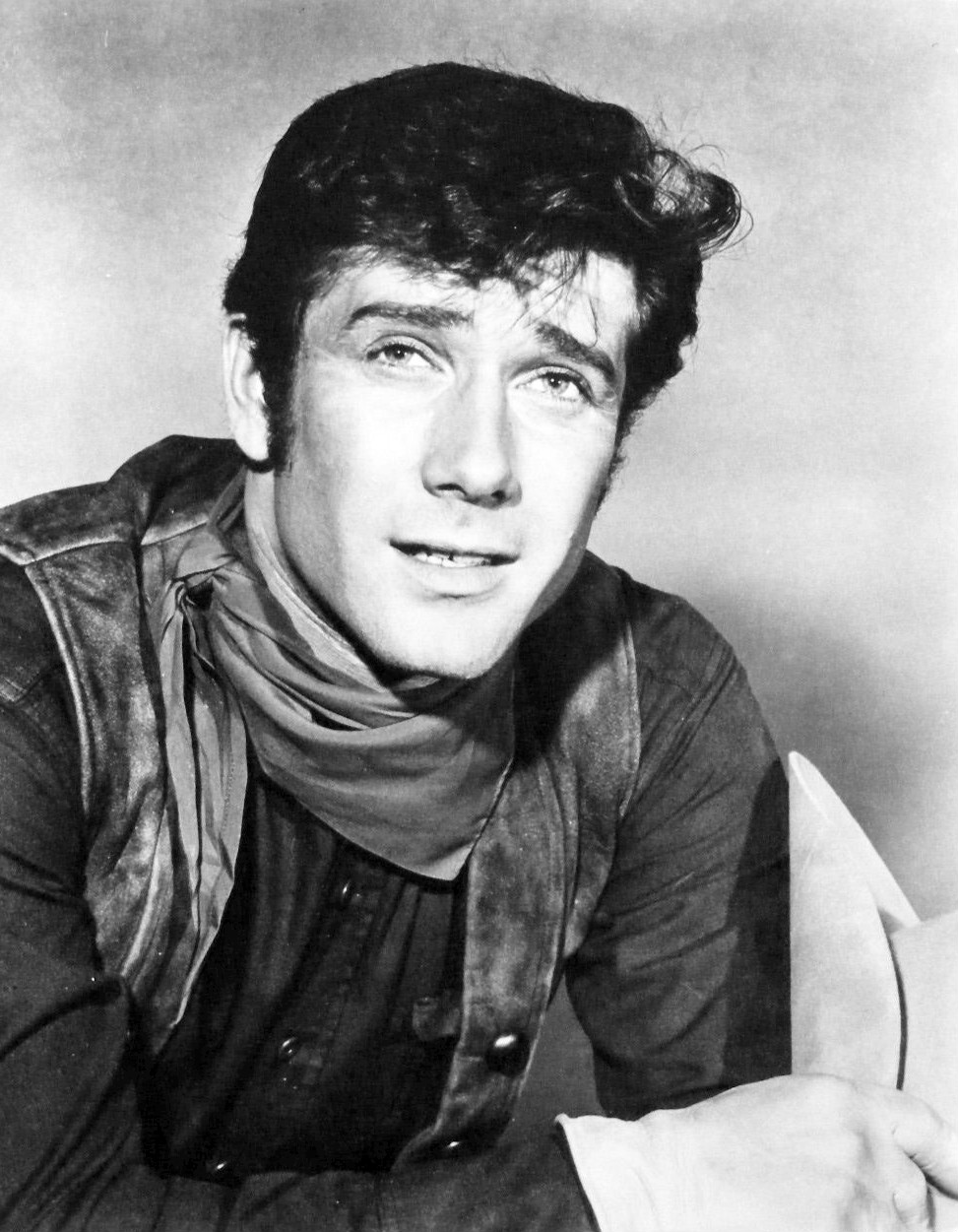
Robert Fuller as Cooper Smith

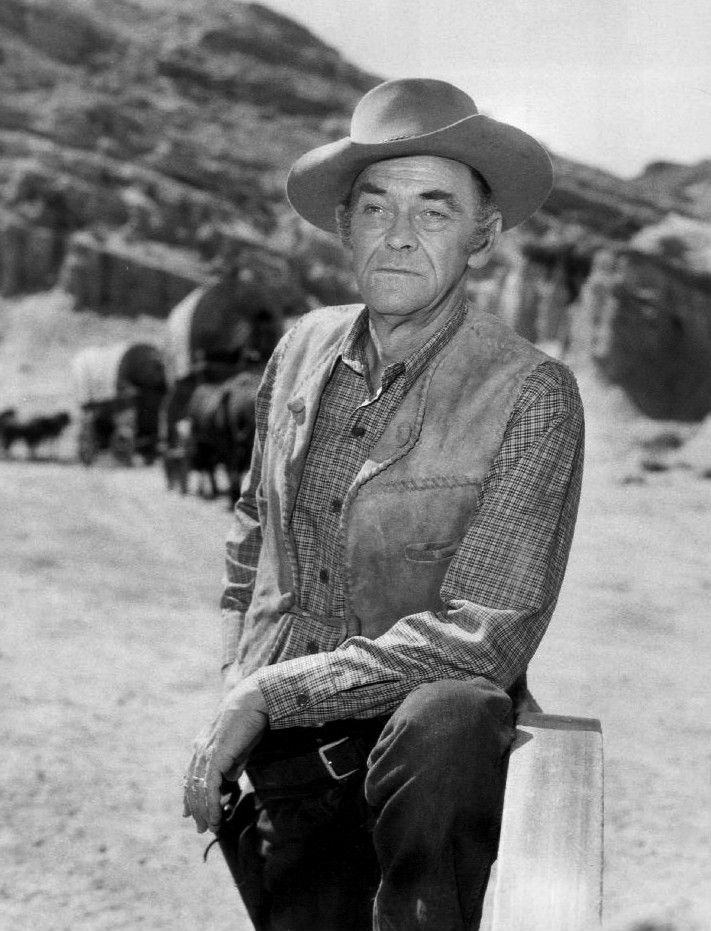
John McIntire as Chris Hale

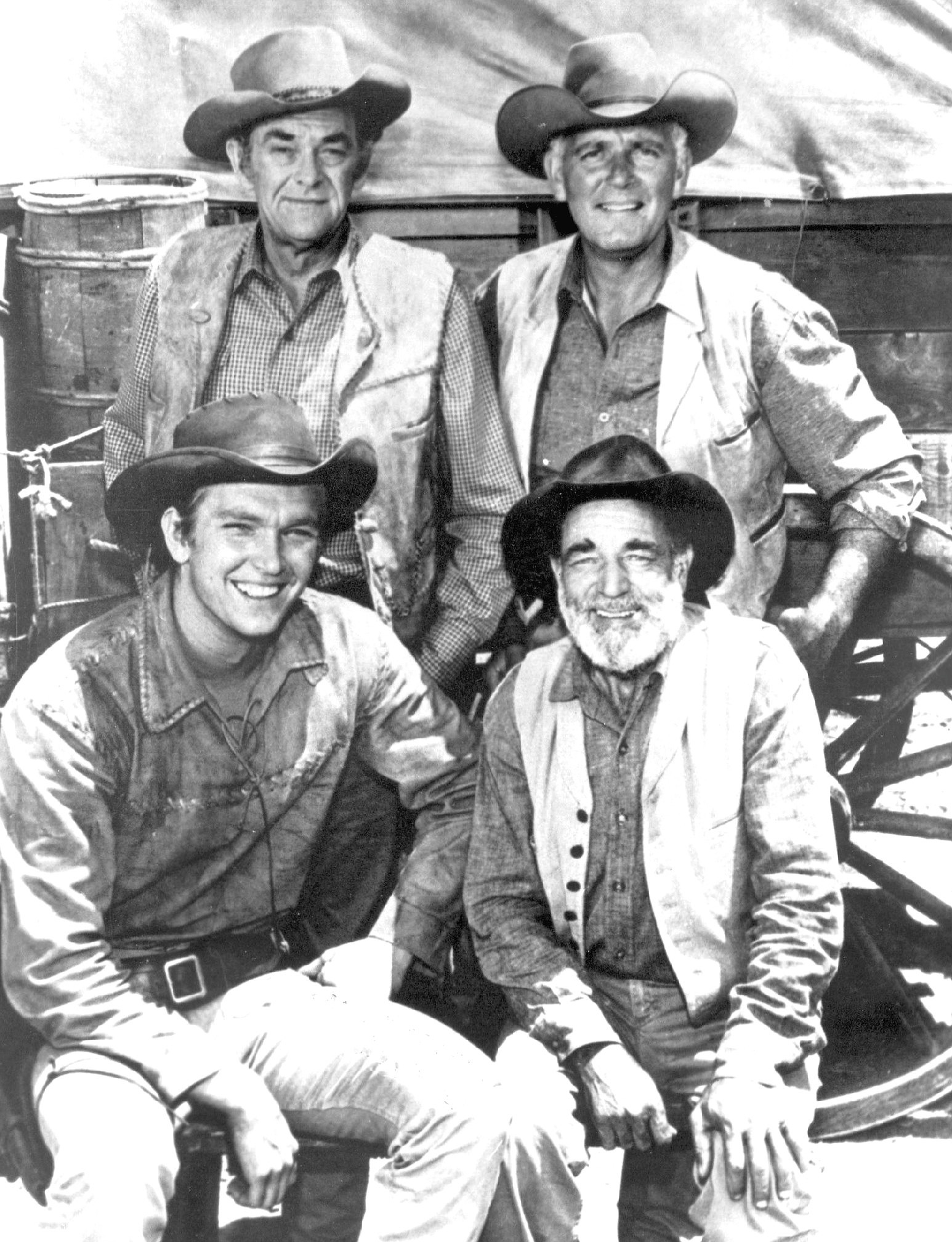
1962 cast. Top: John McIntire, Terry Wilson. Bottom: Scott Miller, Frank McGrath.

Back row: Robert Fuller, John McIntire, Terry Wilson. Front row: Michael Burns, Frank McGrath.

The series chronicles the adventures of a wagon train from St. Joseph, Missouri, across the plains of the Midwestern United States and the Rocky Mountains to Sacramento, California. It features the trials of the series regulars, who conducted the train through the American West.

Episodes revolve around the stories of guest characters portraying members of the massive wagon train or people encountered by it. Many starring roles were played by already famous actors such as Ernest Borgnine, Bette Davis, Jane Wyman, Ronald Reagan, Lee Marvin, and Joseph Cotten. Episode titles routinely emphasize the guest characters, such as "The Willy Moran Story" and "The Echo Pass Story".

As a favor to Ward Bond, film director John Ford joined the show to direct a 1960 segment titled "The Colter Craven Story", which includes many members of the "John Ford Stock Company", momentarily featuring John Wayne speaking from the shadows and billed in the credits as "Michael Morris".

== Cast ==
The regular cast includes:

- Ward Bond as wagon master Major Seth Adams (1957–61, seasons 1–4). Bond died of a heart attack in the middle of the fourth season, and was replaced by John McIntire as wagon master. No explanation was ever given on the show.
- Robert Horton as scout Flint McCullough (1957–62, seasons 1–5).
- John McIntire as Christopher Hale (1961–65, seasons 4–8), replacing Bond as wagon master upon Bond's death. McIntire had guest starred in a Season 3 episode in the role of preacher Andrew Hale, apparently Christopher's brother according to a reference made by Christopher later in the series.
- Robert Fuller as scout Cooper Smith (1963–65, seasons 7–8) replacing the McCullough character after Robert Horton left the series. Fuller had previously played a lead in the Western series Laramie and physically resembled Horton. Fuller and McIntire rotated top billing from week to week on the series. Fuller even shared the same birthday as Horton, albeit nine years apart.
- Frank McGrath as cook Charlie Wooster (1957–65, seasons 1–8), one of only two regulars to last the entire series.
- Terry Wilson as Bill Hawks (1957–65, seasons 1–8), was one of only two regulars to last the entire series.
- Michael Burns as Barnaby West (1960–65, seasons 6–8).
- Denny Miller (aka; Scott Miller) as Duke Shannon (1961–64, seasons 4–7).
- Chick Hannan in various roles (1957–65, seasons 1–8), mostly as a wagon train member.

In the first four seasons, Ward Bond was billed above Robert Horton in the opening credits. In season five, Horton rotated top billing with relative newcomer John McIntire, a practice which subsequently continued with McIntire and Robert Fuller rotating top billing from episode to episode when Fuller joined the series in the seventh season.

During the sixth season, Horton had left and Fuller had not yet replaced him, so McIntire carried the show with the supporting cast. Neither Bond nor McIntire, both veterans of dozens of supporting roles in movies, routinely had a leading role in theatrical films, although Bond did in at least one B-picture. Rivals Bond and Horton frequently quarreled on the set, an extensively publicized development at the time, while their characters disputed within the episodes. According to Scott Eyman in his biography of John Wayne, Bond's jealousy of Horton was fueled by Horton receiving more fan mail. Eyman stated Bond would try to limit Horton's screen time and interfere with any good lines Horton might be given in the scripts. They eventually reconciled shortly before Bond's death.

=== Guest stars ===
- Claude Akins appeared in four episodes during the show's first four seasons.
- Anna Maria Alberghetti carried the lead in "The Conchita Vasquez Story" (1959), cast as part of a gang of Comancheros who intend to attack the wagon train to steal rifles headed to the United States Army. Conchita decides to leave the Comancheros and move west after she falls in love with the scout Flint McCullough, but she is killed by a bullet from her own people when they ambush the wagon train.
- Eddie Albert appeared as Kurt Davos in the 1962 episode "The Kurt Davos Story" as a blacksmith forced to leave the train by a crippling injury.
- Roscoe Ates appeared in the 1958 episode "The Sacramento Story" in his later familiar role of "Old Timer".
- Parley Baer appeared in three episodes in different seasons, usually as a disgruntled passenger.
- Carla Balenda appeared as Martha Leeds in "The Annie Duggan Story" (1963), credited as Sally Bliss.
- Martin Balsam appeared as Marcey Jones in the 1964 episode "The Whipping".
- Trevor Bardette was Will Rudge in "The Levi Hale Story" (1962), Sheriff Lund in "The Lily Legend Story", and Henry Ludlow in "The Antone Rose Story" (both 1963).
- William Bendix, in the second season, played a sea captain who had shanghaied Adams and Wooster in "Around the Horn".
- Charles Bickford and Roger Smith, five months before Smith was cast on 77 Sunset Strip, appear in "The Daniel Barrister Story", which aired on 16 April 1958 (Season 1, Episode 29). In this segment, Daniel Barrister, played by Bickford, objects to medical treatment for his wife, Jenny, the victim of a wagon accident. Meanwhile, Dr. Peter H. Culver, played by Smith, has successfully fought a smallpox epidemic in a nearby town. He is brought to the wagon train by scout Flint McCullough to treat Mrs. Barrister. Viewers never know if Barrister yielded to allow Dr. Culver to treat Jenny.
- Theodore Bikel appeared in "The Dr. Denker Story", season five, episode 14, in the role of a traveling musician who is transporting a mysterious shipment of dynamite to San Francisco for the United States Army.
- Ernest Borgnine appeared five times on Wagon Train, including twice as "Willy Moran" (albeit for only a few moments in Moran's second appearance). In the pilot episode on 18 September 1957, Borgnine's Moran is revealed as a former boxer consumed by alcoholism but seeking sobriety. Michael Winkelman guest starred as young "Ben Palmer" in this episode, as he was beginning his regular role as Little Luke McCoy on ABC's The Real McCoys. On 1 October 1958, Borgnine reprised the role of Willy Moran in the episode "Around the Horn". Major Adams had fought with Moran at the Battle of Gettysburg.
- Neville Brand appeared in "The Zebedee Titus Story" in 1964 as an aging pioneer who joins the wagon train as a scout.
- Henry Brandon appeared six times, most notably in "The St. Nicholas Story" (1959).
- John Carradine appeared in supporting roles in the 1958 episode. "The Dora Gray Story", and the 1960 episode, "The Colter Craven Story".
- Lon Chaney Jr. appeared as Louis Roque in "The Jose Morales Story", Season 4, episode 5 (1960), and in the 1961 episode, "The Chalice", as Carstairs.
- Jan Clayton and Beulah Bondi highlight "The Prairie Story", written by Jean Holloway, which examines how the forbidden prairie, particularly the strong wind, plays havoc on the lives of the women on the wagon train. This theme is also examined in the novel The Wind by Dorothy Scarborough. Robert Horton carries the lead in this episode that aired on 1 February 1961, three months after the death of Ward Bond.
- Jeanne Cooper guest stars in an episode titled "The Whipping" shown during season 7 (1963–64) of Wagon Train.
- Lou Costello appeared as the title character in one of his last roles, "The Tobias Jones Story" (1958). It was written by Harry von Zell, the announcer and comedian from the Burns and Allen television series, who also appears in that episode. Von Zell also appears in the 1964 episode "The Link Cheney Story".
- Walter Coy, one of the narrators of the 1955-56 Frontier anthology series on NBC, appeared five times on Wagon Train between 1957 and 1964.
- Child actor Johnny Crawford appeared in "The Sally Potter Story" (1958).
- Yvonne Craig guest-starred in "The Link Cheney Story" (1964).
- Henry Daniell appeared twice in "The Christine Elliott Story" (1960) and the two-parter "Trial for Murder" (1960).
- Ronnie Dapo, then a child actor, appeared in the episode "The Greenhorn Story". He was later a regular on Room for One More and The New Phil Silvers Show.
- Linda Darnell guest starred in "The Dora Gray Story" (29 January 1958) as an attractive young woman trying to reach San Francisco. Dora is traveling west with an unsavory peddler, played by John Carradine, who is selling guns to the Indians. Robert Horton carries this episode, with Mike Connors and Dan Blocker portraying corrupt U.S. Army officers.
- Bette Davis appeared in three episodes as different characters; as Bettina May (1961), Ella Lindstrom (1959) and Madame Elizabeth McQueeney (1959).
- Laraine Day played the title character in "The Cassie Vance Story" (1963).
- William Demarest appeared in "The Christopher Hale Story" (1961).
- Frank de Kova plays the lead in "The Isaiah Quickfox Story" (31 January 1965), a mystery set in a ghost town amid a stunning bat cave. Andrew Prine and John Doucette guest star in the roles of Eric Camden and Bert Enders, respectively. Cast members Robert Fuller and Frank McGrath carry this episode.
- Andy Devine appeared in the 1959 episode "The Jess MacAbbee Story".
- Angie Dickinson portrays the lead role in "The Clara Duncan Story" (1959).
- John Doucette played the title characters in the 1963 episode, "The Michael McGoo Story" as a retired sea captain, and the 1964 episode, "The Ben Engel Story", as well as supporting roles in six other episodes.
- Charles Drake played the title characters in the 1958 episode, "The Charles Maury Story" as an ex-Confederate marauder, and the 1960 episode, "The Sam Livingston Story" as a wagon driver with bitter memories, and the 1963 episode, "The Hollister John Garrison Story" as a Southerner with a desperate secret, and the 1964 episode, "The Link Cheney Story" as a wounded gambler hoping to retire, and supporting roles in two other episodes.

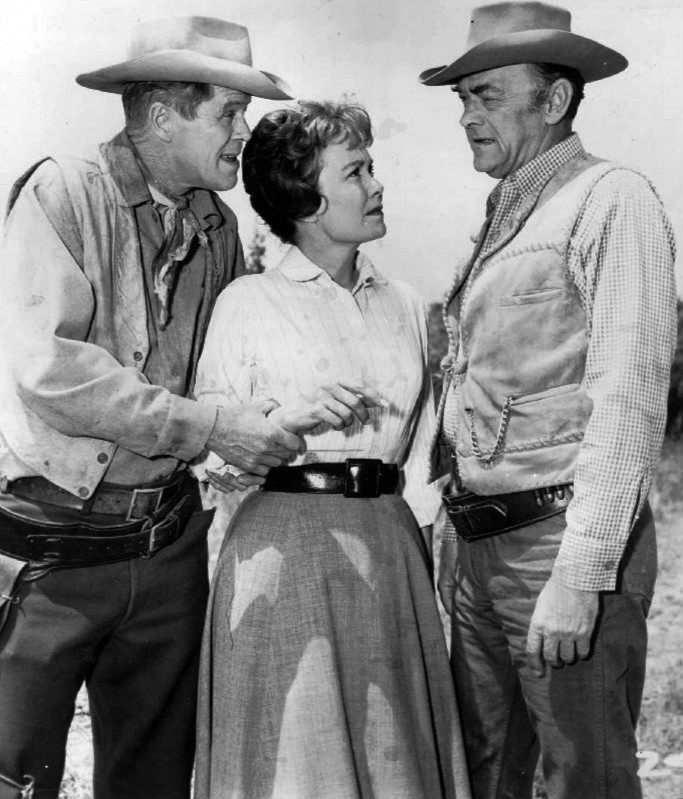
Guest stars Dan Duryea and Jane Wyman with John McIntire, 1962

- Dan Duryea made seven appearances on the series, his first role being that of the title character in "The Cliff Grundy Story", broadcast on 25 December 1957. Cliff Grundy, an old friend of Flint McCullough, joins with the Wagon Train in time for a buffalo hunt. After an accident, Cliff and Flint are stranded in the wild, trying to survive until they can reach a small town. This was one of Dan Duryea's rare "sympathetic" roles, and one that he would reprise for the final Wagon Train episode of the same season. In his fourth appearance on Wagon Train, he played a mentally unstable man obsessed by demons and superstitions in "The Bleymier Story", broadcast 16 November 1960, eleven days after the death of Ward Bond. Samuel Bleymier opposes the interest shown to his daughter, Belle, portrayed by Elen Willard, by a young pioneer, Justin Claiborne, played by James Drury, some two years before the start of his The Virginian series. The episode is filmed mostly in the dark or during heavy rains, high winds and a cyclone, and involves pioneers passing through a Sioux burial ground.
- Jena Engstrom appeared three times. In 1961 she was featured in "The Jenna Douglas Story" with guest star Carolyn Jones. In 1962 she was featured in "The Amos Billings Story", guest-starring Paul Fix. And in 1964 she appeared in support of Joseph Wiseman in "The Santiago Quesada Story".
- Glenda Farrell appeared in the 1959 episode "The Jess MacAbbee Story" as Andy Devine's character's wife.
- Ron Foster appeared twice in the 1957 episodes "The John Cameron Story" and "The Julia Gage Story".
- Rhonda Fleming appeared three times. In the 1958 episode "The Jennifer Churchill Story", in the 1961 episode "The Patience Miller Story" and in the 1963 episode "The Sandra Cummings Story".
- Med Flory was cast as Sheriff Gile in "The Nancy Palmer Story", with Audrey Meadows in the guest-starring role (1961).
- Nina Foch appeared as the title character in "The Clara Beauchamp Story".
- Louise Fletcher appeared as different characters in two Season 3 episodes.
- Eduard Franz appeared in the lead in 1957 in "The Les Rand Story", and James Philbrook had a minor role in the same episode.
- Kathleen Freeman appeared in five different episodes, usually as the embodiment of ignorance or intolerance.
- Annette Funicello appeared in "The Sam Pulaski Story" (Nov. 1963)
- George Gobel appeared as Major Adams' country cousin in "The Horace Best Story", the Season 4 premiere episode.
- Don Grady appeared in "The Christine Elliot Story" (1960).
- Lorne Greene appeared in "The Vivian Carter Story" (1959).
- Tom Greenway appeared as Dr. Quinn in "The Dan Hogan Story" (1958).
- Kevin Hagen appeared four times on Wagon Train as Lansing in "The Willy Moran Story" (1957) and as Claymore in "The Nels Stack Story" (1957) and "The Annie MacGregory Story" (1958) and as Ed Prentiss in "The Silver Lady" (1965).
- Sessue Hayakawa appeared as the title character in "The Sakae Ito Story" (1958).
- Peter Helm appeared three times on Wagon Train in 1962 and 1963: "The Daniel Clay Story", "The Wagon Train Mutiny", and in the title role "The Tom O'Neal Story", with Myron Healey cast as his father.
- Dwayne Hickman appeared in the title guest-starring role in "The Clay Shelby Story" in December 1964. Celia Kaye played Ann Shelby, and Richard Carlson and Mort Mills were cast as military officers.
- Darby Hinton, a child actor, appeared in March 1964 as Benjie Diel in the 75-minute episode "The Ben Engel Story".
- Dennis Holmes, another child actor, appeared three times on Wagon Train, including the role of Danny Blake in "Those Who Stay Behind", along with Peter Brown and Bruce Dern (8 November 1964).
- Dennis Hopper appeared as the title character in "The Emmett Lawton Story" as the crippled son of the murdered sheriff in a town taken over by outlaws, March 1963.
- Rodolfo Hoyos Jr., as Padre in "The Don Alvarado Story", 21 June 1961, with Ed Nelson as Sheriff Donovan
- Sherry Jackson appeared as the title character in "The Geneva Balfour Story", which was originally broadcast on 20 January 1964.
- Anne Jeffreys and her husband, Robert Sterling, play a couple with an unusual "half-marriage" courtship arrangement brought about by an attack of fever in the episode "The Julie Gage Story", the fourteenth episode of the series broadcast on 18 December 1957.
- Brad Johnson and Susan Oliver in the title role appear in the 9 November 1960, episode "The Cathy Eckhardt Story", with Johnson cast as Will Eckhardt.
- I. Stanford Jolley appeared ten times, but not in the lead role of an episode.

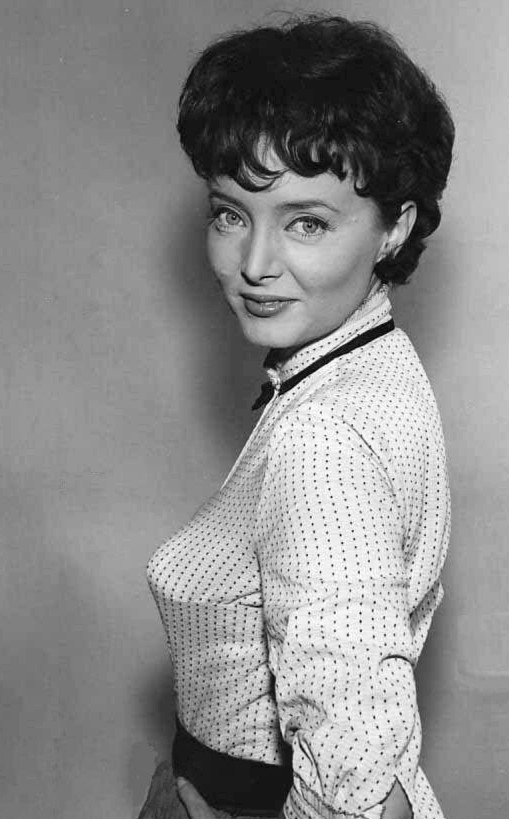
Carolyn Jones in a 1961 appearance

- Carolyn Jones appeared during the show's first four episodes, also as the title characters in "The Jenna Douglas Story" (1961) as a traumatized woman found by the wagon train, and in "The Molly Kincaid Story" (1963) as an escaped captive of the Indians intent on punishing the husband who abandoned her.
- Dick Jones was cast as John Hunter in "The Wagon Train Mutiny" (1962).
- J. M. Kerrigan appeared in "The St. Nicholas Story" (1959).
- Brett King appeared five times on Wagon Train, his last as a lieutenant in "The Sandra Cummings Story" (1963).
- Charles Laughton appeared as Albert Farnsworth in "The Albert Farnsworth Story". (1960)
- Linda Lawson guest starred in "Princess of a Lost Tribe" (1960).
- Art Linkletter appeared as the title character in "The Sam Darland Story" (1962).
- Peter Lorre played the title character in "The Alexander Portlass Story" (March 1960).
- Dayton Lummis appeared in three episodes: as Maj. Barham in "The Martha Barham Story" (NBC, 1959), as T.J. Gingle in "The John Turnbull Storey" (NBC, 1962), and as the Rev. Philip Marshall in "The Myra Marshall Story" (ABC, 1963), with Suzanne Pleshette in the title role.
- Lee Marvin appeared as Mexican bandit Jose Morales in the Season 4 episode "The Jose Morales Story". After 20 episodes he appeared as newly hired wagonmaster Jud Benedict in the Season 4 episode that introduced the Chris Hale character, "The Christopher Hale Story".
- Raymond Massey guest starred in "Princess of a Lost Tribe" (1960).
- Mike Mazurki appeared in "The Duncan McIvor Story" (1964).
- Tyler McVey appeared six times on Wagon Train, including a two-part 1960 episode "Trial for Murder".
- Audrey Meadows played the title character in "The Nancy Palmer Story" (1961).
- Joyce Meadows appeared three times: as Martha Williams in "The Conchita Vasquez Story" (1959), as Rheba Polke in "The Jed Polke Story" and as Melanie in "The Artie Matthewson Story" (both 1961).
- Ralph Meeker appeared in the title role of "A Man Called Horse" (season one, ep 26, trans 26 March 1958) in a story that served as the basis for the Richard Harris film A Man Called Horse, a decade later.
- Burgess Meredith guest starred in "The Grover Allen Story" (1964).
- Vera Miles appeared three times on Wagon Train as the lead role in "The Sister Rita Story" (1959), as Janice Stuart in "The Bob Stuart Story" (1964) and as Anne Reed in "The Silver Lady" (1965).
- Ricardo Montalbán appeared as the title character in the second episode of the series, "The Jean LeBec Story".
- Archie Moore, African-American prizefighter, appeared as a cowboy in "The Geneva Balfour Story", which was originally broadcast on 20 January 1964.
- Read Morgan appeared three times: as Ben Denike in "The Vincent Eaglewood Story" with Wally Cox in the title role (1959), as Curly Horse in "The Martha Barham Story" with Ann Blyth (1959), and as Jake in "The Myra Marshall Story".
- Ed Nelson guest stars in the episode "Alias Bill Hawks", a story of townspeople covering for a murder, and trying to dig a needed artesian well. Terry Wilson, as the real "Bill Hawks", arrives to put the puzzle together.
- Leslie Nielsen guest stars in "The Jeremy Dow Story".
- Leonard Nimoy appeared in four episodes-—twice as a Mexican, once as an Indian and once as one of three Spanish brothers.
- Susan Oliver guest starred in four episodes: "The Emily Rossiter Story" (1957), "The Maggie Hamilton Story" (1960), "The Cathy Eckhart Story" (1960), and "The Lily Legend Story" (1963).
- Prolific Western actor Gregg Palmer appeared in three episodes: as Groton in "The Mary Halstead Story" (1957), as Paul Dawson in "The Riley Gratton Story" (1957), and as Raleigh in "The Jose Morales Story" (1960).
- Michael Parks was cast as Hamish Browne in "The Heather and Hamish Story" with fellow guest star Anne Helm (1963), and as Michael Malone in "The Michael Malone Story", with Joyce Bulifant (1964).
- John Pickard appeared as Jed Otis in the 1959 episode "The Matthew Lowry Story".
- Ronald Reagan, in one of his final acting roles prior to his entering politics, played Captain Paul Winters in the seventh-season episode "The Fort Pierce Story", first broadcast in September 1963.
- Michael Rennie appeared in two episodes: "The John Cameron Story" (1957) and "The Robert Harrison Clarke Story" (1963).
- Cesar Romero appeared in "The Honorable Don Charlie Story" (1958).
- Mickey Rooney guest starred as "greenhorn" Samuel T. Evans in "The Greenhorn Story" (1959), and again as Samuel T. Evans with young wife Melanie (Olive Sturgess) in "Wagons Ho!", the 1960 season premiere. Ellen Corby played the role of Aunt 'Em in both episodes. Sturgess in her role had to wear the lowest of heels so as not to tower over the 5'2" Rooney.
- Pippa Scott guest-starred in "The Link Cheney Story" (1964).

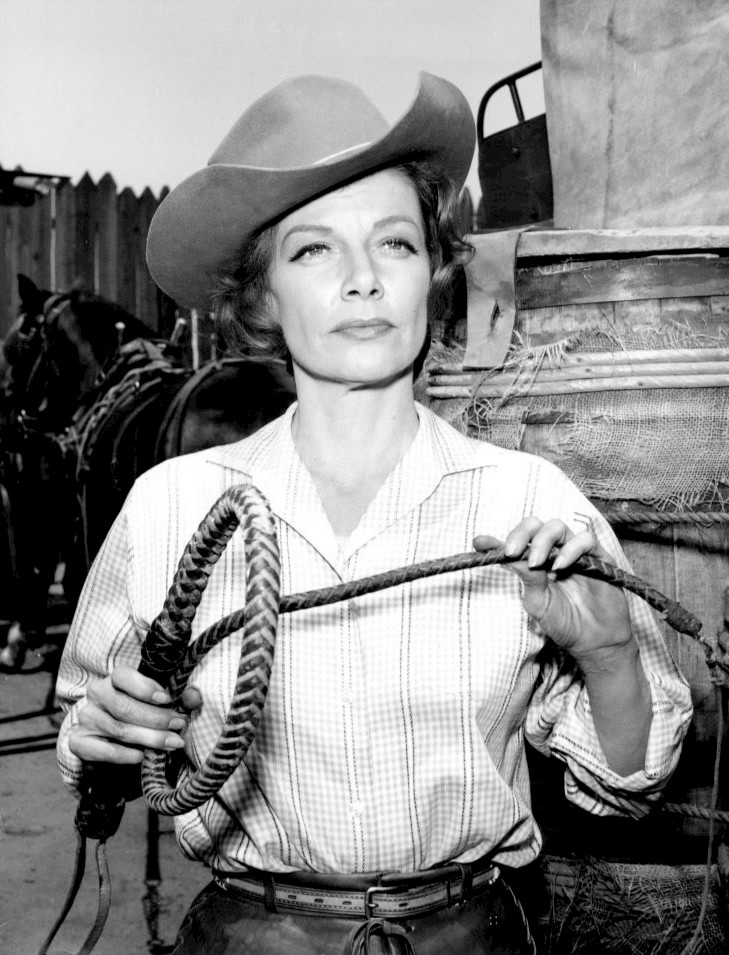
Ann Sheridan in "The Mavis Grant Story", 1962

- Ann Sheridan guest-starred in "The Mavis Grant Story" (1962).
- Tom Simcox and Paul Stader guest-starred in "The Link Cheney Story" (1964).
- Roger Smith - (see "Charles Bickford" earlier in the list)
- Arnold Stang played the lead in "The Ah Chong Story", the tale of an ebullient Chinese cook who joins the wagon train with a rickshaw. Ah Chong produces higher quality and more reliable food service than Charlie Wooster, who has become arrogant because of his success at poker playing. Ah Chong introduces wagonmaster Chris Hale and his assistant, Bill Hawks, to bird nest soup. Wooster soon sees Ah Chong as a threat in both cooking and poker, and hurls insults at him. Frank Ferguson plays a sheriff at the beginning of this episode, which aired near the end of the fourth season on 14 June 1961.
- Barbara Stanwyck appeared three times.
- Rod Steiger portrayed a blind doctor heading west in "The Saul Bevins Story" (1961). The other travelers object to his inclusion on the train because of the obstacles he must overcome. Vivi Janiss plays his sister, Martha Bevins; Charles Herbert, his son Job Bevins. Janiss also appeared in five other Wagon Train episodes.
- Charles Stevens appeared twice in "The Nels Stack Story" (1957) and "The Mark Hanford Story" (1958).
- Dean Stockwell appeared in four episodes, including "The Rodney Lawrence Story" (10 June 1959), in which he portrays a young white man whose parents were massacred by other whites, and he is reared by a single Indian. The Indian urges Rodney to rejoin his people when the wagon train passes through the area, and soon after he joins the train he is accused of murder and theft. Scout Flint McCullough proves that Rodney is innocent, and he becomes attracted to a young white woman, Mandy McCrea (Cynthia Chenault). Roger Mobley plays Lawrence as a child in a flashback.
- Karl Swenson played mountain man Jim Bridger in "The Jim Bridger Story". Francis De Sales also appeared in the episode as Mark.
- Akim Tamiroff appeared in "The Joe Muharich Story" (1961).
- Phyllis Thaxter was cast in the title role of "The Christine Elliott Story" (1960), in which a young woman takes a group of orphan-boys, who had previously lived in her late father's orphanage, to a new life in the West. Don Grady and Gary Hunley also appear in this episode.
- Franchot Tone appeared in the lead role in "The Malachi Hobart Story" as a traveling preacher who loses confidence in his own Christian message.
- Lee Van Cleef appeared in "The Jesse Cowan Story" (1958).
- Johnny Washbrook appeared as Tommy Peeks in "The Swift Cloud Story", with Rafael Campos in the 1959 title role, and as Ron Pearson in "The Beth Pearson Story", with Virginia Grey in the 1961 title role.

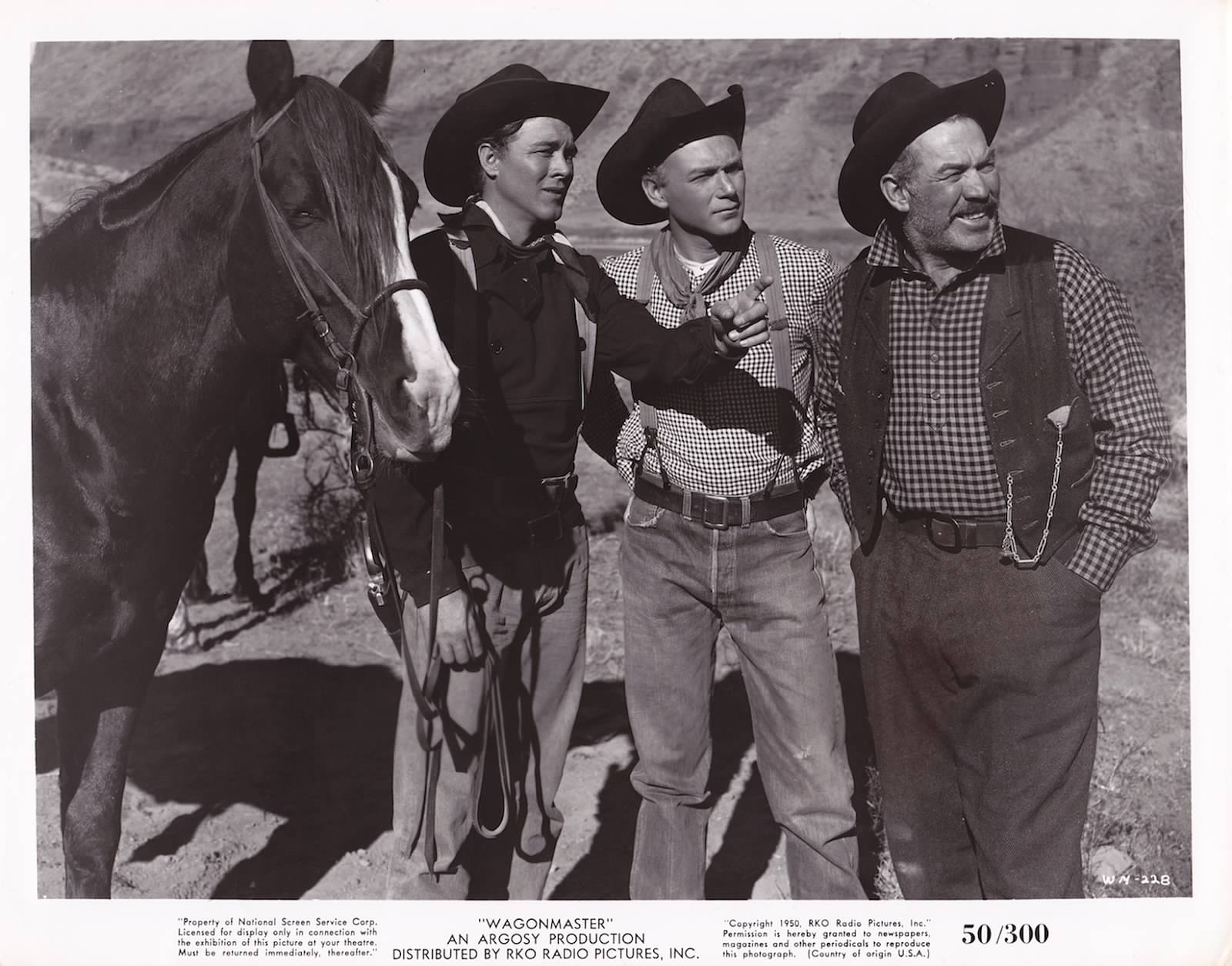
Ben Johnson, Harry Carey Jr. and Ward Bond in John Ford's feature film, Wagon Master (1950), one of the primary cinematic inspirations for the series. Ford dressed Bond identically to this, with the black hat and checkered shirt, in the Wagon Train episode that Ford later directed titled "The Coulter Craven Story" featuring many regulars from Ford films, including John Wayne.

- John Wayne appeared briefly, partly obscured by distance and shadow, in a long shot in the episode directed by John Ford, "The Coulter Craven Story", in which he portrays General William Tecumseh Sherman and speaks briefly. In this episode, Wayne is billed under the pseudonym "Michael Morris", a reference to his real name, Marion Michael Morrison. Several other regulars from Ford's films also appeared, including John Carradine, Ken Curtis and Hank Worden. Ford used action footage from his 1950 film Wagon Master in this episode, which was shown 18 days after Bond's death and is the only episode in this series directed by Ford. Wayne also played Sherman under Ford's direction in the movie How the West Was Won, and was billed as "Michael Morris" for a lengthy Ford-directed cameo appearance in the Alcoa Premiere television anthology show episode titled "Flashing Spikes" (1962) starring James Stewart.
- Marlene Willis played a supporting role in "The Jess MacAbbee Story" starring Andy Devine.
- Guinn "Big Boy" Williams appeared in "The Vincent Eaglewood Story" (1959).
- Shelley Winters appeared during the show's first four episodes.
- Jane Wyman appeared twice, once in "The Doctor Willoughby Story" (1958), as a woman doctor heading west. And, again in "The Wagon Train Mutiny" (1964).
- Dick York guest-starred in "The Michael Malone Story" (1964) as Mitchell.
- Tony Young guest-starred as Quent Loomis in "The Melanie Craig Story", with Myrna Fahey in the title role (1964).
- Harry von Zell guest-starred in "The Link Cheney Story" (1964) and "The Tobias Jones Story" (1958).

== Episodes ==
Season	Episodes	Originally released			Rank	Rating
Season	Episodes	First released	Last released	Network	Rank	Rating
1	39	September 18, 1957	June 25, 1958	NBC	23	27.7
2	38	October 1, 1958	June 24, 1959	NBC	2	36.1
3	37	September 30, 1959	June 22, 1960	NBC	2	38.4
4	38	September 28, 1960	June 21, 1961	NBC	2	34.2
5	37	September 7, 1961	June 13, 1962	NBC	1	32.1
6	37	September 19, 1962	June 5, 1963	ABC	25	22.0
7	32	September 16, 1963	April 27, 1964	ABC	N/A	N/A
8	26	September 20, 1964	May 2, 1965	ABC	N/A	N/A

== Production ==
=== Development ===
Taking inspiration from John Ford's 1950 film Wagon Master, Revue Productions conceived of a semi-anthology series with an emphasis on strong storytelling and quality direction with weekly guest stars known for their work in motion pictures and other media but retaining a regular cast of characters to provide a touchstone for audiences.

At an initial budget of US$100,000 (equivalent to $1,146,000 in 2025) per segment, Wagon Train episodes cost over 40% more than most contemporary hour-long Westerns, allowing it to film on location in California's San Fernando Valley and afford its expensive guest stars.

=== Theme music ===
The first season theme "Wagon Train" was written by Henri René and Bob Russell, and lyrics were not used. The theme was conducted by Revue musical director Stanley Wilson. In the second season, a new more modern sounding theme was introduced. "(Roll Along) Wagon Train" was written by Sammy Fain and Jack Brooks and sung by Johnny O'Neill. About midway through the second season this was replaced with an instrumental version by Stanley Wilson. In the third season a more traditional sounding score was introduced. "Wagons Ho!" was written and conducted by Jerome Moross, who adapted it from a passage of music he had written for the 1959 film The Jayhawkers. This theme would last through the series's run and is the most remembered Wagon Train theme. Stanley Wilson re-recorded "Wagons Ho!" when the series was broadcast in color in 1963, then an abbreviated version of the 1963 re-recorded theme was used for the final season when it returned to black-and-white.

== Release ==
=== Original broadcast ===
The show ran for 284 episodes over 8 seasons: the first aired on September 18, 1957, and the final segment was broadcast on May 2, 1965.

The series aired for most of its run as hour-long episodes in black-and-white except for five episodes during the 1961–62 season which were produced and broadcast in color to promote NBC's parent company RCA's color television sets. After its move to ABC the show mirrored "The Virginian" on NBC by filming in color and expanding to 90 minutes. In its final and eighth season and due to declining ratings, the show returned to its hour format and was filmed in black and white.

=== Syndication ===
When the original Ward Bond episodes were broadcast weekday afternoons on ABC beginning in 1963, a new series title "Seth Adams Trailmaster" was given to the episode to avoid viewer confusion because Wagon Train was still on the ABC evening schedule. A new theme song, the "Trailmaster Theme", written and conducted by Stanley Wilson, was used for these syndicated episodes. The later episodes from the John McIntire era were syndicated under the simpler title "Trailmaster." All episodes eventually reverted to their original titling after the series left the air. The 75-minute episodes were usually syndicated separately, sometimes shown on local stations as "movies."

One episode very seldom shown is "Princess of the Lost Tribe" (season 4 episode 6, shown 6 Nov 1960), in which Flint McCullough happens upon the hiding place of descendants of the Aztec Indians - now moved up from central Mexico to the vicinity of Arizona, with Raymond Massey playing their king, Montezuma IX, speaking English with flawless educated diction.

=== Home media ===
In 2004, Alpha Video released three episodes of Wagon Train on DVD. Four years later Timeless Media Group released a DVD selection consisting of 12 episodes on three discs. Also in 2008, it released The Complete Color Season, a 16 disc box set with season seven and 16 select episodes from the other seasons. From 2010 to 2013, Timeless Media Group released the series in eight box sets of one season each, and the seventh season lacks the bonus episodes.

== Cultural influences ==
Gene Roddenberry said he pitched Star Trek as "Wagon Train to the stars", referring to the concept of a recurring cast on a long journey with famous guest stars becoming the focus of various stories. In his March 11, 1964, initial pitch document, he wrote, "Star Trek is a Wagon Train concept—built around characters who travel to worlds 'similar' to our own."
