= The Wind (novel) =

1925 novel by Dorothy Scarborough

- First edition
- Author: Dorothy Scarborough
- Language: English
- Genre: Texas literature, Western novel
- Publisher: Harper & Brothers
- Publication date: 1925
- Publication place: United States
- Media type: Print (Hardback, Paperback & Serialization)
- Pages: 337 (first edition, hardback)

The Wind is a novel by Dorothy Scarborough published in 1925 by Harper & Brothers. A tragic coming-of-age tale, the narrative examines the struggles of a young woman transplanted to a small West Texas ranching community in late 1880s who is tormented by the incessant wind.

It was later made into a film called The Wind (1928) starring Lillian Gish and directed by Victor Sjöström

According to Texas folklorist J. Frank Dobie, this novel "excited the wrath of chambers of commerce and other boosters in West Texas--a tribute to its realism."

== Plot ==
Set in Sweetwater, Texas in the late 1880s, the novel is written from a third-person omniscient point-of-view.

The book opens with an untitled preface, introducing the wind as the motivating force in the narrative, personified as a supernatural and demonic entity of immense power. The human focal character is 18-year-old Letty Mason who is predestined to face the wind as her nemesis. Petite, pretty, and with a refined upper-class education, Letty was raised in Virginia on a once grand—now defunct—plantation. She finds herself an orphan, impoverished and homeless after her invalid mother dies. Her only relative is a cousin, Beverley Mason, a Virginia gentleman while in his youth, but now a struggling cattleman in Texas. Arranged by her local pastor, Letty travels by rail to live with his family as a tutor to his children.

En route she meets the handsome and genial Wirt Roddy of Fort Worth, a wealthy 30-something absentee ranch owner who is acquainted with Letty’s cousin and familiar with life in rural Texas. Interviewing her, he urges Letty to return to Virginia: the Texas plains are no place for a girl of her genteel background. Only menial work, social isolation and, not least, the devastating high winds, await her. When Letty demures, Wirt provides his address and promises to assist her if she wishes his support.

Arriving in Sweetwater, Letty meets Lige Hightower, a 20-something rancher. He escorts her to the Mason ranch. The tall and homely Lige, a natural renconteur, entertains Letty with tales of the west: its history, hardships and joys. A self-taught naturalist, he is full of country witticisms and cowboy lore. In passing, Lige cautions Letty to tread lightly with her cousin-in-law, Bev’s wife Cora. She is the de facto manager of the ranch.

Cousin Bev welcomes Letty with genuine warmth. His wife Cora, a tall, superbly formed woman, exudes good health and vigor. She conveys a subtle but unmistakable hostility towards Letty. Cora proudly exhibits her four children: Bev Jr. age ten, Dan age eight, Alice age six, and little Cora, age one. The family lives in a four-bedroom cabin. Letty commences her duties as a governess, but feels ill-equipped for the task. She discovers that the two boys are undisciplined and rowdy; only Alice is willing to study. Letty sleeps in the children’s bedroom.

Lige visits the Mason ranch with his associate Sourdough. A cowpuncher, the outgoing Sourdough is a flamboyant dresser and a favorite of Cora; they engage in lively repartee.

Letty is increasingly disturbed by Cora’s domineering behavior; a petty tyrant, she is constantly interfering in Letty’s efforts to educate the children. As winter sets in, the icy winds torment Letty. Lige and Sourdough confront Letty and good-naturedly insist that she marry one of them. When she emphatically declines, Cora berates her, eager to see the girl carried off by a suitor as a wife. Bev comes to his cousin’s defense and a heated exchange ensues between husband and wife. Bev asserts himself and a tense truce is established.

When Bev and Cora are away on a visit, a powerful norther descends upon the ranch. Letty and the children are terrified by the storm until Lige arrives to look after them. Though she doesn’t love Lige, she submits in desperation to a marriage vow, if only for Bev’s sake and to escape Cora’s domination. She blames her predicament on the vicious wind. Moving in with Lige and Sourdough after the marriage, Letty performs her household duties at their isolated ranch. In spring, Wirt Roddy suddenly appears when Letty is home alone. Wirt affects a tone of nonchalance, telling Letty that the wind and sand has begun to mar her former beauty. He gives her a small rifle to shoot wildlife. Secretly, she bitterly regrets he had not returned before her marriage to Lige.

A severe drought has come close to wiping out the Hightower cattle; Lige faces financial ruin. In the midst of this crisis, Letty suffers a nervous breakdown and begs Lige to send her away for the winter: she can no longer endure the wind. Indignant, Lige chastises her for being a quitter and praises Cora’s loyalty to Bev. Letty heartlessly reminds Lige that Cora married Bev for love, unlike their union. Lige is thunderstruck, mounts his horse and rides away. At a nearby ranch, he drinks himself into a stupor.

Wirt Roddy visits the Hightower ranch and finds Letty agonizing over Lige’s departure; she has gone nearly mad from the winds. When he insists that she abscond with him to Fort Worth, she refuses, believing that Lige will return. Wirt rapes her. The next morning, Wirt implicates Letty in the sexual assault and assures her that Lige will discover her faithlessness. When he threatens to carry her away, she shoots him dead with the rifle he gave her. She buries the body on the premises and, deranged, flees into the desert to join the wind—“her demon lover.”

== Publication background ==
Scarborough’s manuscript for The Wind was accepted by Harper & Brothers in 1925. Considering its unconventional depiction of the Old West, the publishers decided—for commercial reasons—to pique public interest by releasing it anonymously; Scarborough consented to this scheme.

Texas readers, to Harper’s and Scarborough’s dismay, reacted virulently. Rather than interpreting the novel in context- a historical rendering of the devastating West Texas droughts of 1886 and 1887—contemporary Texans suspected that the anonymity of the author concealed an anti-Texas critic. Despite, or because of this, seventeen hundred copies sold in the first two weeks of its release.

In 1926, Harpers released a second edition, this time with Dorothy Scarborough’s authorship included.

== Reception ==
1979 reissue with Introduction by Sylvia Ann Grider

The response to The Wind outside the South was generally positive.

In Texas, the work was widely disparaged. The reaction to the work in Texas became a topic itself. Texas Monthly (September 1929) wrote:

[T]here appeared anonymously…a Texas novel, called The Wind. Speculation was rife which Texas writer had dared write such a story about Texas. It was discussed by people all over the Lone Star State, and roundly “cussed” by West Texans.

The discontent registered by West Texans, especially those from town of Sweetwater, arose largely from the conflation of Scarborough’s description of the late 19th century Sweetwater—a village she had lived in and visited as a child—with the post-World War I reality of an emerging commercial metropolis.

Sweetwater lawyer C. C. Crane and president of the West Texas Historical Society publicly condemned the book: “A deliberate effort, by disregard and exaggeration and distortion of facts, to deliver a slam on West Texas in the making."

Scarborough mounted a spirited public defense of her work, opening with this declaration of her Texas heritage and commitments:

You ask for a statement as to how I came to write the book. To begin with, I naturally chose settings and incidents because I am a Texan, and a thorough one. I’d match my loyalty against that of anybody in the state. And as our great State offers such varied, unlimited, and almost untouched possibilities for fiction, poetry, and the drama, her native sons and daughters would be foolish to look elsewhere for literary inspiration.

Crane and Scarborough largely reconciled their differences, and she accepted an invitation to a luncheon by the Sweetwater Chamber of Commerce in 1928 at which Scarborough “completely charmed her audience.”

== Retrospective appraisal ==
Historian Sandra Myres in her 1982 Westering Women and the Frontier Experience, 1800-1915, characterizes Scarborough’s narrative as a stereotype “of the frightened, tearful woman wrenched from home and hearth and dragged off into the terrible West where she is condemned to a life of lonely terror…The space, the wind, the emptiness of the prairies and plains drove [Letty Mason] to melancholia and eventually to suicide or, at best, to an insane asylum.”

Literary critic Sherrie A. Inness adopts a feminist critique of the novel, arguing that Scarborough’s female protagonist is more than a mere reworking of an “old stereotype”:

Although many writers have portrayed women who were unprepared for frontier life, Scarborough uses this experience in a subversive fashion, not to condemn the individual woman but to critique a society that provides few opportunities for feminine autonomy. She uses the Western novel to condemn social assumptions and expectations about how middle-class women should lead their lives, showing that traditional ideology about women's acceptable behavior inevitably creates women unprepared to meet the demands of frontier life.

== Theme ==
Writing in December 1925, Scarborough explained her motives and thematic concerns informing The Wind: “[I]n the back of my mind had been for a long time to write a story to show the effects of the wind and sand on a nervous, sensitive woman, of the type not prepared to deal with it. That seemed like good drama to me.”

Scarborough chastened her “West Texas critics” for missing the thematic elements of The Wind: “One is that the story is given through the mind of the homesick, frightened girl, who sees everything distorted to a certain extent. The other is that the story is a study in obsession, the tyranny of fear.”

== Film adaptation ==
It has been adapted once, in 1928, directed by Victor Sjöström and starring Lillian Gish. The film notably changed the novel's ending, with Letty not going insane from the wind and her murder of Wirt, having conquered her fear of the wind and wanting to stay with her husband.

== See also ==
- Prairie madness

== Sources ==
- Grider, Sylvia Ann. 1979. FORWARD to The Wind. pp. v-xvii. University of Texas Press, Austin, Texas and London, England. ISBN 0-292-79012-0
- Inness, Sherrie A. 1996. "Good Enough for a Man or a Dog, but No Place for a Woman or a Cat": The Myth of the Heroic Frontier Woman in Dorothy Scarborough's "The Wind.” American Literary Realism, 1870-1910 , Winter, 1996, Vol. 28, No. 2 (Winter, 1996), pp. 25–40. University of Illinois Press. https://www.jstor.org/stable/27746651 Accessed August 6, 2025.
- Myres, Sandra L. 1982. Westering Women and the Frontier Experience, 1800-1915. University of New Mexico Press, Albuquerque, N.M. ISBN 9780585200880
- Scarborough, Dorothy. 1979. The Wind. Reprint of 1925 Harper & Brothers publication. University of Texas Press, Austin, Texas and London, England. ISBN 0-292-79012-0
