= Perrow =

Perrow is a surname. Notable people with the surname include:

- Charles Perrow (1925–2019), American sociologist
- E. C. Perrow (1880–1968), American professor of English
- Mark Perrow (1965–2020), South African sprint canoer
- Mosby Perrow Jr. (1909–1973), American lawyer and politician

== See also ==
- Thorp Perrow Arboretum
