= Shortnin' Bread =

Traditional song

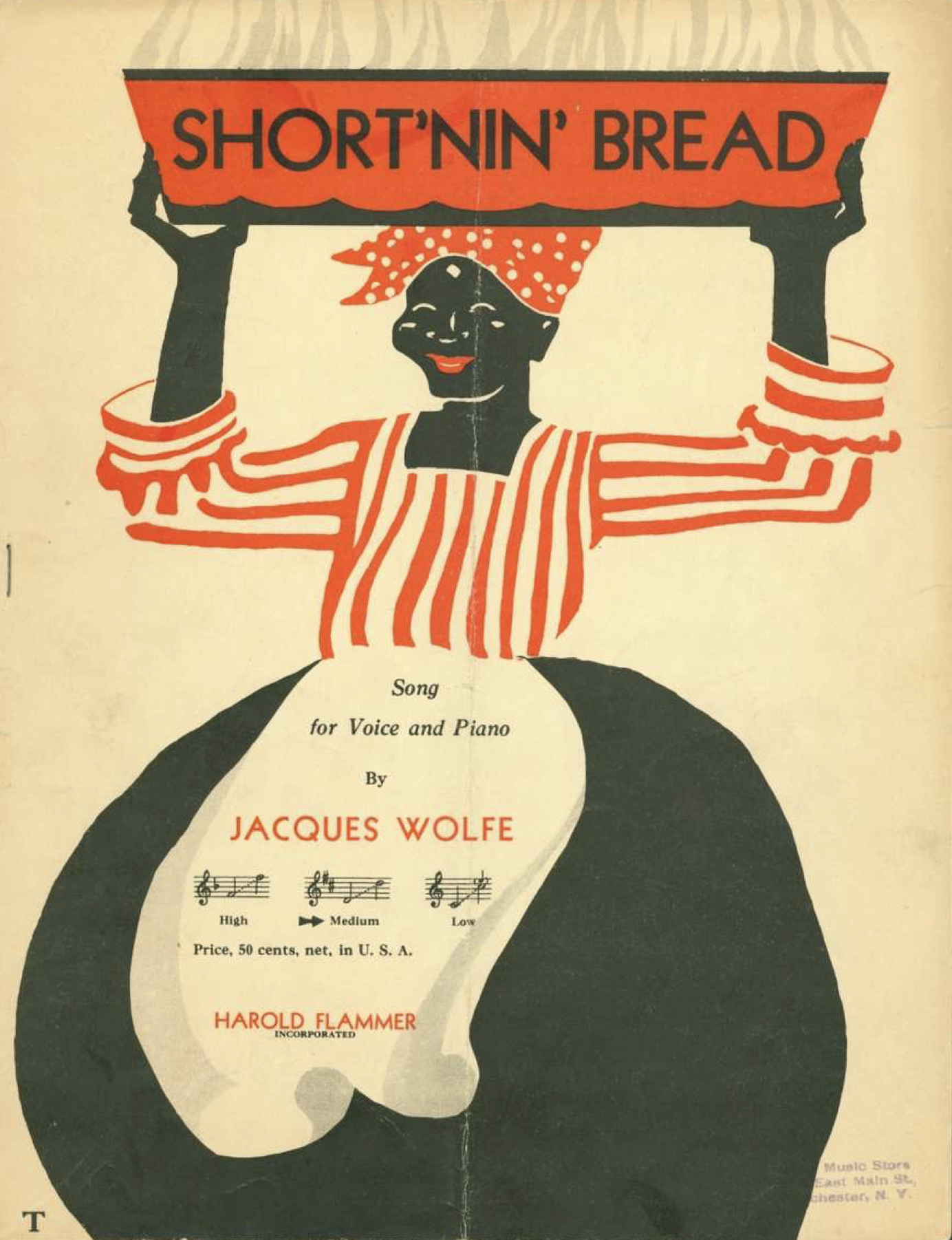
- 1928 sheet music cover for an arrangement of "Short'nin' Bread" by Jacques Wolfe.

Song
- Written: c. 1890s
- Published: 1900
- Songwriter: James Whitcomb Riley

"Shortnin' Bread" (also spelled "Shortenin' Bread", "Short'nin' Bread", or "Sho'tnin' Bread") is an American folk song dating back at least to 1900, when James Whitcomb Riley published it as a poem. While there is speculation that Riley may have based his poem on an earlier African-American plantation song, no definitive evidence of such an origin has yet been uncovered. A "collected" version of the song was published by E. C. Perrow in 1915. It is song number 4209 in the Roud Folk Song Index.

'Shortening bread' refers to a bread made of corn meal and lard shortening, with or without flour.

== Origins ==
The origin of "Shortnin' Bread" is obscure. Despite speculation of African-American roots, it is possible that it may have originated with Riley as a parody of an African-American plantation song, in the minstrel or coon song traditions popular at the time.

Riley titled the song "A Short'nin' Bread Song—Pieced Out", and wrote the first verse as:

Fotch dat dough fum the kitchin-shed
Rake de coals out hot an' red
Putt on de oven an' putt on de led
Mammy's gwiner cook som short'nin' bread

The dialect rendered into common American English would be:

Fetch that dough, from the kitchen shed
Rake those coals out, hot and red
Put on the oven and put on the lid
Mommy's going to cook some short'nin' bread

The verse includes:

When corn plantin' done come roun'
Blackbird own de whole plowed groun'
Corn is de grain as I've hearn said
Dat's de blackbird's short'nin' bread

Another pair of verses may be later, and exist in several versions:

Three little children, lying in bed
Two was sick and the other 'most dead
Send for the doctor and the doctor said
"feed them children on short'nin' bread"

When those children, sick in bed,
heard that talk 'bout short'nin' bread.
They popped up well, to dance and sing,
skipping around and cut the pigeon wing.

In some versions there are two children instead of three – and the "other" either "bump'd his head" or "was dead". The first does not quite scan. The children (or "chillun") were once referred to by one of several racist terms.

Other verses include:

Pull out the skillet, pull out the led,
Mama's gonna make a little short'nin' bread
That ain't all she's gonna do,
Mama's gonna make a little coffee too

I slipped to the kitchen, slipped on the led,
slipped my pockets full of short'nin' bread.
I stole the skillet, I stole the led,
I stole the girl who makes short'nin' bread

They caught me with the skillet, They caught me with the led,
They caught me with the girl who makes short'nin' bread.
I paid six dollars for the skillet, six dollars for the led,
Spent six months in jail eating short'nin' bread.

Reese DuPree composed a version recorded in 1927.

== Folk version ==
Titled "Shortened Bread", E. C. Perrow published the first folk version of this song in 1915, which he collected from East Tennessee in 1912. The folk version of the song—as with Riley's—does not have any distinct theme, but consists of various floating lyrics, some relating to "shortnin' bread", some not. The traditional chorus associated with the folk song is:

Mammy's little baby loves short'nin', short'nin'
Mammy's little baby loves short'nin' bread (rpt.)

== Other renditions ==
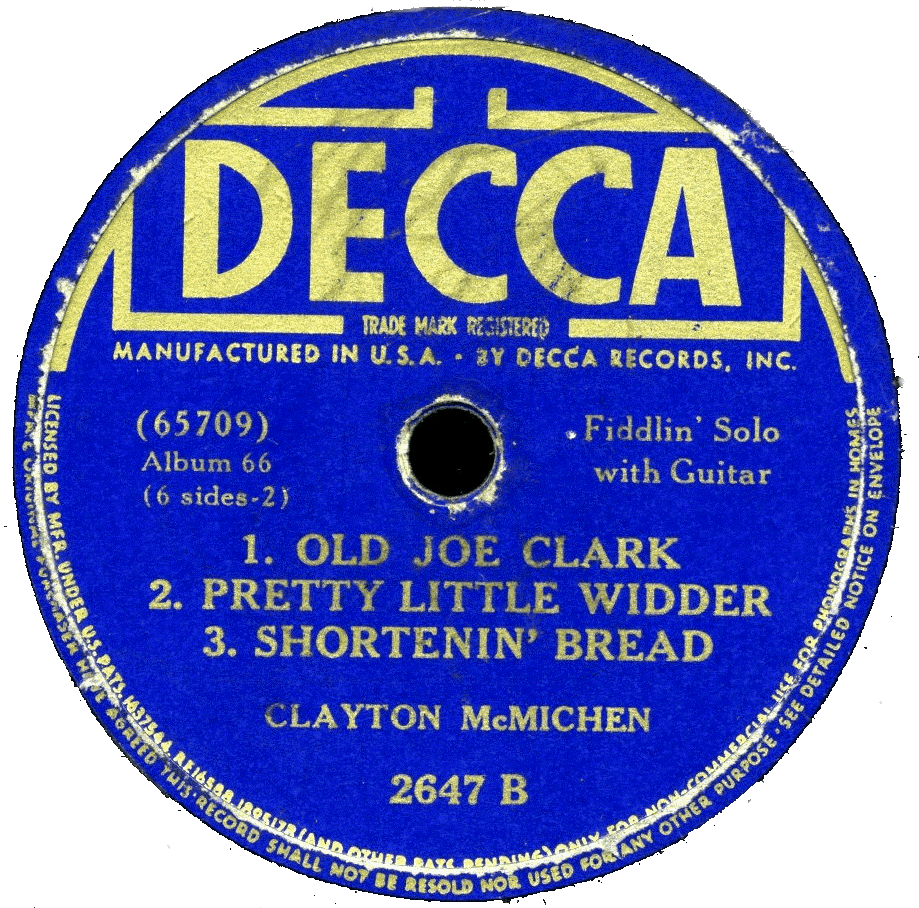
Version by Clayton McMichen

- Al Jolson
- 1926 - Gid Tanner
- 1933 – Paul Robeson
- 1938 - The Andrews Sisters
- 1961(?) - The Viscounts
- 1952 - Sonny Terry, Sonny Terry's New Sound: The Jawharp in Blues and Folk Music (1968)
- Lawrence Tibbett
- Fats Waller
- 1959 - Dave Brubeck
- 1961 - Frances Faye
- Richard White
- Clayton McMichen
- 1937 – Nelson Eddy, Maytime
- 1956 - Etta James, Etta "Miss Peaches" James: Shortnin' Bread Rock / Tears of Joy
- 1963 – Mississippi John Hurt, D.C. Blues: Library of Congress Recordings
- 1966 – Lee Dorsey
- 1977 - Charles Mingus (parody)
- 1979 and 2026 - The Beach Boys, L.A. (Light Album), We Gotta Groove: The Brother Studio Years
- 1982 – Klaus Flouride
- 1981 – The Kelly Family, Wonderful World!
- 1990 – The Cramps, Stay Sick
- 1997 - Taj Mahal
- 1998 – The Tractors, Farmers in a Changing World (reached No. 57 on the Hot Country Songs chart), Heaven's Sake Kids
- 2002 – Laurie Berkner, Under a Shady Tree
- 2014 and 2017 – The Wiggles
- 2023 – Israel's Arcade

=== The Beach Boys versions ===
"Shortenin' Bread" was recorded by the American rock band the Beach Boys numerous times. One version was released as the final track on their 1979 album L.A. (Light Album). An earlier version from the Adult/Child project was released on We Gotta Groove: The Brother Studio Years in 2026. The band's principal songwriter Brian Wilson was reportedly obsessed with the song, having recorded more than a dozen versions of the tune. Beach Boy Al Jardine speculated that Wilson's obsession with the song may have begun after co-writing the song "Ding Dang" with the Byrds' Roger McGuinn in the early 1970s.

==== Personnel ====
Adult/Child Version

Credits sourced from John Brode, Will Crerar, Joshilyn Hoisington, and Craig Slowinski.

The Beach Boys

- Carl Wilson - lead vocals
- Brian Wilson - co-lead and backing vocals, grand piano, grand piano with taped strings, Fender Rhodes electric piano, Baldwin organ, Minimoog, tambourine
- Dennis Wilson - drums

Additional musicians

- Jim Horn - baritone saxophone
- Diane Rovell - backing vocals

L.A. (Light Album) Version

Credits sourced from Craig Slowinski.

The Beach Boys

- Al Jardine – backing vocals
- Bruce Johnston – backing vocals, Fender Rhodes electric piano
- Mike Love – backing vocals
- Brian Wilson – piano, Moog synthesizer
- Carl Wilson – lead and backing vocals, guitars?
- Dennis Wilson – lead vocals, drums

Additional musicians

- Michael Andreas – saxophone
- Joe Chemay – additional bass guitar
- Bernard Fleischer – saxophone
- James William Guercio – bass guitar
- Billy Hinsche – guitars
- Chuck Kirkpatrick – guitar
- Jimmy Lyon – lead guitar
- Rod Novak – saxophone
- Fred Selden – saxophone
- Sterling Smith – Hammond organ

== Bibliography ==
- Badman, Keith (2004). The Beach Boys: The Definitive Diary of America's Greatest Band, on Stage and in the Studio. Backbeat Books. ISBN 978-0-87930-818-6.
- Carlin, Peter Ames (2006). Catch a Wave: The Rise, Fall, and Redemption of the Beach Boys' Brian Wilson. Rodale. ISBN 978-1-59486-320-2.
- Eitel, Edmund Henry (ed.) The Complete Works of James Whitcomb Riley, Vol 5. Indianapolis: The Bobbs-Merrill Company (1913).
- George-Warren, Holly (20 March 2014). A Man Called Destruction: The Life and Music of Alex Chilton, From Box Tops to Big Star to Backdoor Man. Penguin Group US. ISBN 978-0-698-15142-0.
- Lambert, Philip (2007). Inside the Music of Brian Wilson: the Songs, Sounds, and Influences of the Beach Boys' Founding Genius. Continuum. ISBN 978-0-8264-1876-0.
- Perrow, E.C. "Songs and Rhymes from the South." The Journal of American Folklore, 28:108 (April - Jun. 1915) 129–190.
- Wade, Stephen. The Beautiful Music all Around Us: Field Recordings and the American Experience. Urbana: University of Illinois Press, 2012.
- Waltz, Robert B; David G. Engle. "Shortenin' Bread". The Traditional Ballad Index: An Annotated Bibliography of the Folk Songs of the English-Speaking World. Hosted by California State University, Fresno, Folklore, 2007.
