= The Wind (1928 film) =

1928 film by Victor Sjöström

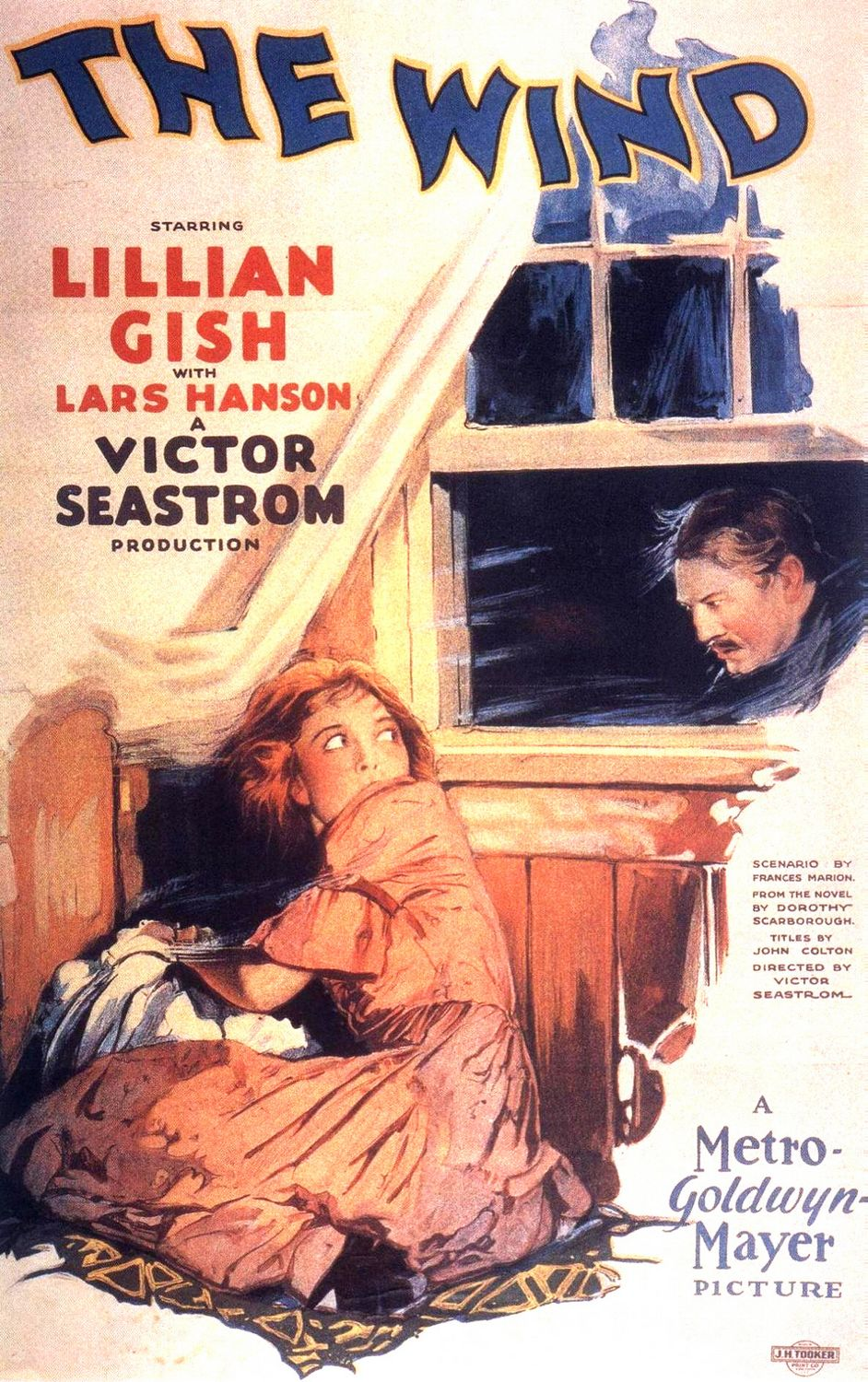
- Theatrical release poster
- Directed by: Victor Sjöström (using an Americanization of his name, as Victor Seastrom)
- Written by: Frances Marion (scenario)
- Based on: The Wind; 1925 novel by Dorothy Scarborough
- Produced by: André Paulvé; Fred Orain
- Starring: Lillian Gish; Lars Hanson; Montagu Love; Dorothy Cumming
- Cinematography: John Arnold
- Edited by: Conrad A. Nervig
- Distributed by: Metro-Goldwyn-Mayer
- Release date: November 23, 1928
- Running time: 95 minutes (original); 78 minutes (TCM Print)
- Country: United States
- Languages: Sound film (Synchronized); English Intertitles

The Wind (1928) by Victor Sjöström

The Wind is a 1928 American synchronized sound romantic drama film directed by Victor Sjöström. While the film has no audible dialog, it was released with a synchronized musical score with sound effects using both the sound-on-disc and sound-on-film process. The movie was adapted by Frances Marion from the 1925 novel of the same name written by Dorothy Scarborough. Featuring Lillian Gish, Lars Hanson and Montagu Love, it is one of the last films released by Metro-Goldwyn-Mayer without audible dialogue and is considered to be among the greatest "silent" films.

The film entered the public domain in the United States in 2024.

== Plot ==
An impoverished young woman named Letty Mason travels west by train from Virginia to live at her cousin Beverly's isolated ranch in Sweetwater, Texas. On the way, she is bothered by the constantly blowing wind. Fellow passenger and cattle buyer Wirt Roddy makes her acquaintance and tells her the wind usually drives women crazy.

Upon arrival, she is picked up by Beverly's closest neighbors, Lige Hightower and the older, balding Sourdough, who live 15 miles from her cousin. Wirt assures her he will drop by occasionally to see how she is doing.

After endless miles in sand and wind, they arrive at the ranch. Beverly is delighted to see her, but his jealous wife Cora gives her a cold reception, despite Letty saying she and Beverly (who was raised by Letty's mother) are like brother and sister. Cora is further angered when her children seem to like Letty better.

At a party, Sourdough tells Lige that he intends proposing to Letty. Lige explains he was planning to do the same. After Wirt drops by, a cyclone interrupts the festivities. Most of the guests seek shelter in the basement, where Wirt declares his love for Letty and offers to take her away from the dismal place. After the cyclone passes, Lige and Sourdough talk to Letty in private. When they flip a coin to see who will ask for her hand in marriage (Lige wins), Letty thinks it is just a joke.

Afterward, Cora demands that Letty leave the ranch. Because she has neither money nor a place to go, she decides to go away with Wirt, but then Wirt reveals that he wants her for a mistress, informing her that he already has a wife. She goes back to Cora, who tells her to choose from her two other suitors. She marries Lige.

When Lige takes her home, he kisses Letty for the first time, but her lack of enthusiasm is unmistakable. Worse for the drink, he becomes more forceful, and she tells him she hates him. He promises he will never touch her, and will try to make enough money to send her back to Virginia. In the meantime, Letty works around the house, but is bothered by the ever-present wind.

One day, Lige is invited to a meeting of the cattlemen, who must do something to avoid starvation. Letty, terrified of being left alone with the wind, begs to go with him, and he agrees. After she cannot control her horse in the fierce wind, he has her get on behind him on his horse. When she falls off, Lige tells Sourdough to take her home.

When the cattlemen return, they bring an unwanted guest, an injured Wirt. After he recovers, Lige insists he participate in a roundup of wild horses to raise money for the cattlemen. Wirt goes along, but later sneaks away and returns to Letty. Out of her mind with fear as she endures the house shaking from the worst windstorm yet, Letty faints soon after Wirt's arrival. He picks her up and carries her to the bed. (Note: The original novel is explicit that Wirt rapes Letty at this point; the film subtly depicts this with a sequence of shots showing a fully-clothed Letty the next morning with her back to the camera, a close-up of Wirt's revolver and holster on the table next to her (implying that he took them off earlier), and a shot of Wirt adjusting his own clothing, strongly implying the rape.)

The next morning, Wirt tries to persuade Letty to go away with him, but she coldly rejects him. He insists, noting Lige will kill them both if they remain. As Wirt becomes more aggressive, Letty picks up Wirt's revolver from the table to defend herself. Confident that Letty will not fire, Wirt grabs the gun and it goes off, killing him. At first startled by Wirt's death, Letty looks confusedly at him and at the gun in her hand; she then decides to bury him outside.

After she is done, she goes back inside the cabin. The wind blows into an even greater fury, and Letty stares with mounting fear through a window as the wind gradually uncovers Wirt's body. Letty runs away from the window, but then sees two hands clasped around the cabin's door trying to force it open; Letty hysterically believes it is Wirt returned from the dead, and falls prone with terror, her face hidden, as someone enters. The hands turn her over, and Letty stares upward blank with madness. However, it is actually Lige, who has returned. After a few moments, Letty returns to sanity and recognizes Lige; she is so glad to see him, she frantically kisses her husband. She then confesses she killed and buried Wirt. When Lige looks outside, however, the corpse is nowhere to be seen. He tells Letty that the wind can remove traces when a killing is justified. He has enough money to send her away, but Letty declares that she loves him, that she no longer wants to leave, and that she is no longer afraid of the wind or anything else.

== Cast ==
- Lillian Gish as Letty
- Lars Hanson as Lige
- Montagu Love as Roddy
- Dorothy Cumming as Cora
- Edward Earle as Beverly
- William Orlamond as Sourdough
- Carmencita Johnson, Laon Ramon and Billy Kent Schaefer as Cora's children

== Music ==
In 2019, the Dallas Chamber Symphony commissioned an original film score for The Wind from composer Alain Mayrand. The score premiered during a concert screening on November 23, 2019, at Moody Performance Hall with Richard McKay conducting.

This film featured a theme song entitled "Love Brought The Sunshine" which was composed by William Axt, David Mendoza, Herman Ruby and Dave Dreyer.

== Production ==
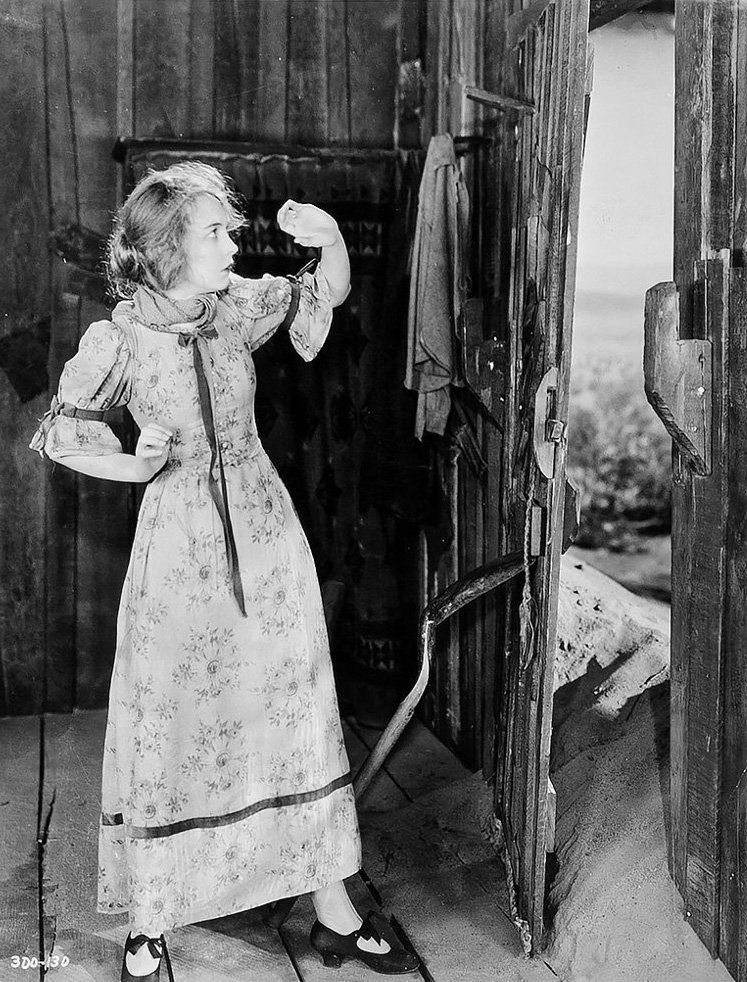
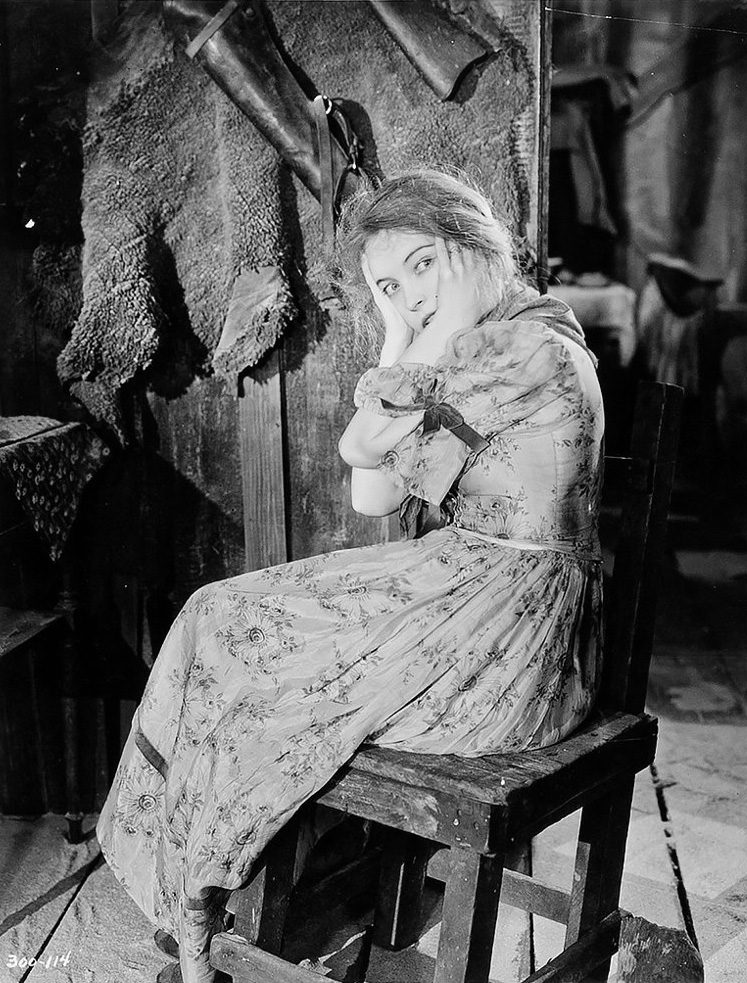
Promotional photos of Lillian Gish for The Wind

Actor Lillian Gish on being directed by Victor Sjöström in The Scarlet Letter (1929): "His direction was a great education to me. In a sense, I went through the Swedish school of acting. I had gotten rather close to the Italian school: The Italian school is one of elaboration; the Swedish is one of repression."— from Albert Bigelow Paine's Life and Lillian Gish (1932).

Gish came up with the idea of making a film adaptation of the novel of the same name. Irving Thalberg immediately gave her permission to do so. Gish recalled wanting Lars Hanson as her leading man after seeing him in a Swedish film with Greta Garbo. She also assigned Victor Sjöström as the director herself. Sjöström had directed Gish before in the 1926 film The Scarlet Letter.

In the original novel, the heroine is driven mad when the wind uncovers the corpse of the man she has killed. She then wanders off into a windstorm to die. According to Gish and popular legend, the original ending intended for the film was the unhappy ending, but it was changed in response to the decree, by the studio's powerful Eastern office, that a more upbeat ending be shot. It is rumored that this tampering caused Sjöström to move back to Sweden. Mayer's biographer rejects this on account that the "sad ending" is not known to exist in any form, written or filmed. Regardless of whether an unhappy ending was originally intended, in the resulting film the "happy" ending replaced the original ending against the wishes of both Lillian Gish and Victor Sjöström.

The film was shot partially near Bakersfield and the Mojave Desert, California.

== Release ==
Although it was completed by the summer of 1927, the film's release was delayed by the studio until November 23, 1928, a full year after the release of The Jazz Singer (1927), when audiences wanted sound films. Gish recalled: "Mr. Thalberg said we had a very artistic film, which I knew was a veiled punch," Like a number of films that appeared on the cusp of the new sound film era, The Wind was overlooked by critics, much as was Josef von Sternberg's The Case of Lena Smith (1929).

=== Box office ===
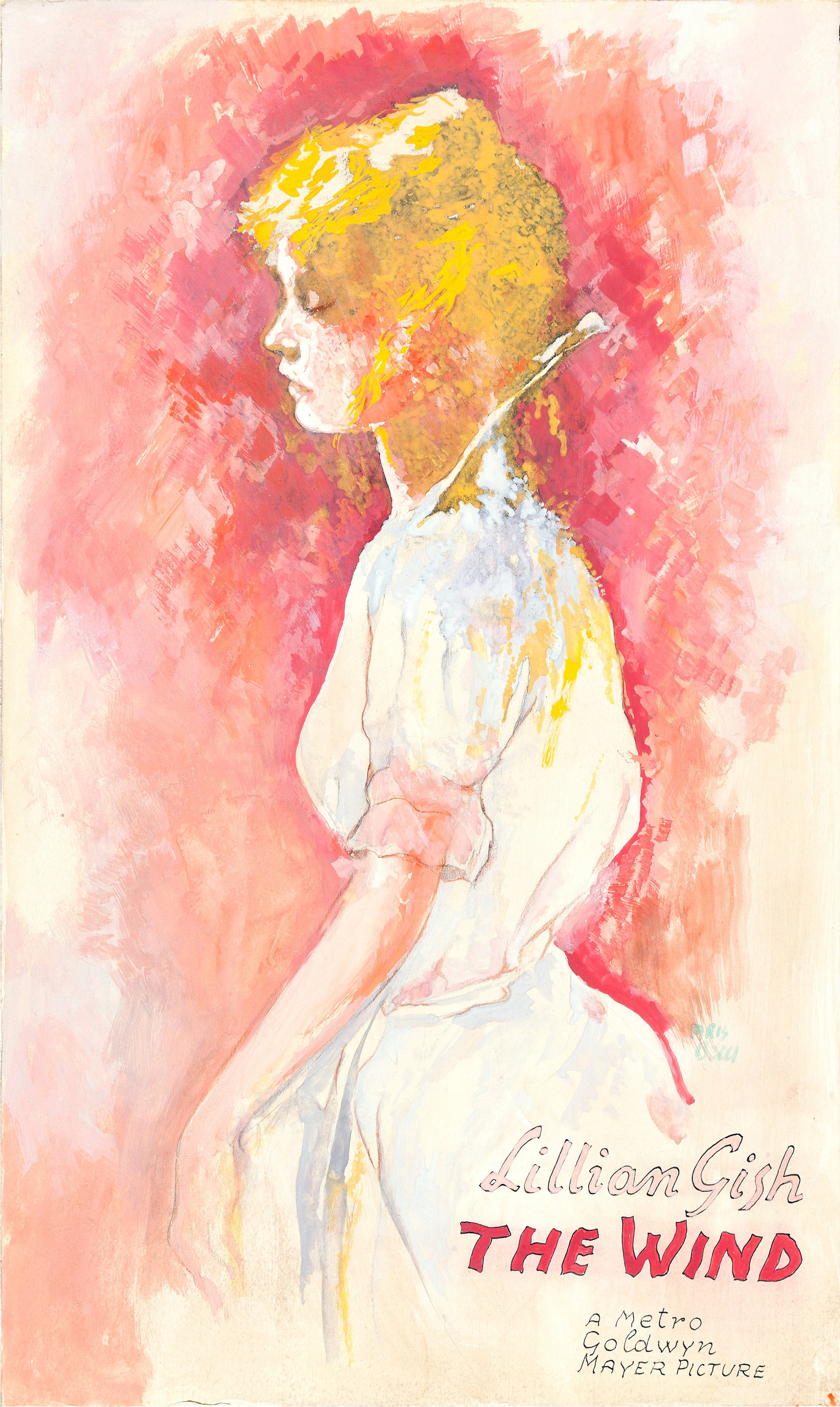
Alternate theatrical release poster

Metro-Goldwyn-Mayer was nervous about releasing the film and did not release it for a full year until November 1928. It was released with a Movietone score and sound effects for theaters equipped with sound; however, by that time, films with 100% dialogue/ talking sequences were being released in theaters, which contributed to The Wind recording an $87,000 loss.

=== Contemporary response ===
The Wind is considered to be a classic, and one of Gish's most brilliant performances. It is the last silent film starring Gish, one of the last films directed by Sjöström in America, and the last major silent released by MGM. At its time it was simultaneously panned and hailed by American critics, and its late release at the dawn of the sound era contributed to a net loss for the production. However, the film had significant critical and considerable commercial success in Europe.

When the film first opened in 1928, many critics panned it. Mordaunt Hall, film critic for The New York Times, for example, was very critical of the film and he found it difficult to suspend his disbelief regarding the special effects and Lillian Gish's acting. He wrote, "Yesterday afternoon's rain was far more interesting than...The Wind,...The rain was real, and in spite of the lowering skies there was life and color around you. In the picture, the wind, whether it is a breeze or a cyclone, invariably seems a sham, and Lillian Gish, the stellar light in this new film, frequently poses where the wind is strongest; during one of the early episodes she does her bit to accentuate the artificiality of this tale by wearing the worst kind of hat for a wind. Victor Sjöström hammers home his points until one longs for just a suggestion of subtlety. The villain's sinister smile appears to last until his dying breath."

=== Retrospective assessment ===
The Wind has gained significant prestige retrospectively.

The British newspaper, The Guardian, in 1999 reviewed the work of director Victor Sjöström and they wrote,

And in America his three most famous works—He Who Gets Slapped (1924), The Scarlet Letter (1926) and The Wind (1928)—each dealt with human suffering. The Wind is almost certainly the best—a silent classic, revived in recent years by producer/director Kevin Brownlow with a Carl Davis score, which gave the great Lillian Gish one of the finest parts of her career...Sjostrom treats the inevitable clash between Letty and her new surroundings with considerable realism and detail, allowing Gish as much leeway as possible to develop her performance. The entire film was shot in the Mojave Desert under conditions of great hardship and difficulty and this was probably the first 'Western' that tried for truth as well as dramatic poetry. One of its masterstrokes, which looks far less self-conscious than any description of it may seem, is the moment when Letty hallucinates in terror at the sight of the partially buried body of her attacker.

In a retrospective of silent films, the Museum of Modern Art screened The Wind and included a review of the film in their program. They wrote, "What makes The Wind such an eloquent coda to its dying medium is Sjöström's and Gish's distillation of their art forms to the simplest, most elemental form: there are no frills. Sjöström was always at his best as a visual poet of natural forces impinging on human drama; in his films, natural forces convey drama and control human destiny. Gish, superficially fragile and innocent, could plumb the depths of her steely soul and find the will to prevail. The genius of both Sjöström and Gish comes to a climactic confluence in The Wind. Gish is Everywoman, subject to the most basic male brutality and yet freshly open to the possibility of romance. As a result, the film offers a quintessential cinematic moment of the rarest and most transcendentally pure art."

Biographer Lewis Jacobs compares The Wind favorably to Austrian-American filmmaker Erich von Stroheim's 1924 masterpiece Greed:

The Wind becomes the physical expression of the emotional struggle of the characters…the outstanding quality of the film was its documentary realism, which had much in common with Greed. Like Greed it penetrated into psychology of the characters by means of an objective treatment of their environment.

Jacobs adds that Sjöström, in his treatment of American Midwesterners was "as uncompromising as von Stroheim in depicting it."

== Theme ==
The chief thematic element of the picture is suggested by the title, namely "human lives molded by the elements." Jacobs writes:

It is the wind that brings about the young girl's meeting with a man who subsequently violates her; it is the wind that forces her into an unwanted marriage; it is the wind that finally drives her to madness and murder.

Film historian Scott Eyman locates the theme in a social issue that preoccupied Hollywood in the late 1920s: "the dangers of the city, and the homicidal small-mindedness of the country." Eyman writes:

[T]he studios were awash in stories about a woman from the city who comes to a rural environment where her innate erotic charge disrupts the social and family order, usually with disastrous result.

== Legacy ==
In 1993, The Wind was selected for preservation in the United States National Film Registry by the Library of Congress as being "culturally, historically, or aesthetically significant."

== Sources ==
- Baxter, John. 1971. The Cinema of Josef von Sternberg. London: A. Zwemmer / New York: A. S. Barnes & Co.
- Eyman, Scott 2023. Charlie Chaplin vs. America: When Art, Sex and Politics Collided. Simon & Schuster, New York. ISBN 978-1-9821-7635-8
- Jacobs, Lewis. 1967. The Rise of the American Film: Experimental Cinema in America, 1921-1947. Teachers College Press, Teacher's College, Columbia University, New York. Library of Congress Catalog Number: 68-25845
- Horwath, Alexander and Omasta, Michael(Ed.). 2007. Josef von Sternberg. The Case of Lena Smith. Vienna: SYNEMA – Gesellschaft für Film und Medien, 2007, ISBN 978-3-901644-22-1 (Filmmuseum-Synema-Publikationen Vol. 5).
