= Reese DuPree =

Singer and music promoter

Reese LaMarr DuPree (July 18, 1883 – April 30, 1963) was an American singer, recording artist, promoter and entrepreneur. He sang the blues and was perhaps the first African-American male to sing and play guitar on a blues record for Okeh Records. He recorded on Victor and Okeh Records.

== Biography ==
DuPree was born July 18, 1883, in Bibb County, Georgia, on a cotton plantation near to Macon, Georgia. He started singing in church and left the plantation around 13 trying his hand at several jobs. Around 1900 he moved to New York City. After winning an amateur competition at the Miner's Bowery Theatre he quit his job and started touring the cities' various amateur competitions. His music professors came from Scotland, England, France and America.

He performed in concerts across the country from New York City to San Bernardino, California.

He is in the movie Turkey in the Straw. In 1932, he performed with a chicken that he taught to sing, which was reported around the world.

DuPree was a promoter of African-American artists and gained much recognition and was honored by the people of Macon and other Middle Georgians. As a promoter, he faced competition from Savoy Attractions. He was described as both internationally famous and national-known promoter and presented such acts as Jimmie Lunceford.

He was added to Asbury Park's Boardwalk Hall of Fame in 2018.

== Songs ==
- "Long Ago Blues" — (OKeh 1923) Vocalist, baritone, composer, lyricist
- "O Saroo Saroo" — (OKeh 1923) Vocalist, baritone
- "Norfolk Blues" — (OKeh 1924) Vocalist, baritone
- "One More Rounder Gone" — (OKeh #8127 - 1924) Vocalist, baritone, songwriter
- "Here's To Your Absent Brothers" — (OKeh 1924) Vocalist, baritone
- "Mammy's Coo Coo" — (OKeh 1924) Vocalist, baritone
- "Shortnin' Bread" — (Victor 1927) Composer
- "Heav'n, heav'n" — (OKeh 1928) Vocalist, baritone
- "Were You There?" — (OKeh 1928) Vocalist, baritone
- "I Got a Home in-a Dat Rock" — (Victor 1929) Vocalist, baritone
