= E. C. Perrow =

American professor of English (1880–1968)

Eber Carle Perrow (1880–1968) was an American professor of English who wrote about the literary history of the last will and testament and southern folk songs. His writings on folk songs were influential.

He was born in Virginia and lived for a while in Tennessee. He received honors as a student at Trinity College in North Carolina where he received an A.B. degree in 1903 and an A.M. degree from the same school in 1905. He received a Doctor of Philology from Harvard University in 1910. He was an Edward Austin Fellow at Harvard. He was an assistant professor at the University of Mississippi. He then became an English professor at the University of Louisville.

While a student at Trinity, he wrote about the controversy that ensued from Trinity professor John Spencer Bassett's editorial "Stirring Up the Fires of Racial Antipathy" about the work of Democratic Party aligned editorialists.

After his retirement from University teaching, he published the 17 page book "Unto the Hills" in 1955 and the 8 page book "Background" in 1956.

== Songs from the South ==
His Songs and Rhymes from the South was published in the Journal of American Folk-Lore in three parts. Volume I: Songs of Outlaws (1911) vol. 25, pages 137–155. Volume II. Songs in which animals figure (1913) vol. 26, pages 123–173 Volumes III-VIII: Game songs and nursery rhymes, Religious songs and parodies of religious songs, Songs connected with the railroad, Songs connected with drinking and gambling, Songs of the plantation, Songs of love (1915) vol. 28, pp. 129–190

He wrote an article on the literary history of the last will and testament.

The Berea Collection includes "correspondence, song texts, and folklore narrative material collected from students by folklore scholar E. C. Perrow, while he was teaching at the University of Louisville diring the early teens of the 1900s. Narrative subject areas include anecdotes, games, riddles, rhymes and superstitions."

Perrow was an influence on Arthur Palmer Hudson.

D. K. Wilgus built on the work of folklorists including Pertow. Berea College has documents Wilgus collected from Perrow and his students.

He filed for copyright protection for his words and music to the song "Louisville" in 1916.

== Songs ==
Songs published in his collection include:

- "The State of Arkansaw" (State of Arkansas (folk song)
- "I Love Coffee"
- "Ballad of Casey Jones"
- "Run, Nigger, Run"
- "This Old Hammer"

== See also ==
- Dorothy Scarborough
- Natalie Curtis
- Alan Lomax
