= Sandra Myres =

American historian

Sandra L. Myres
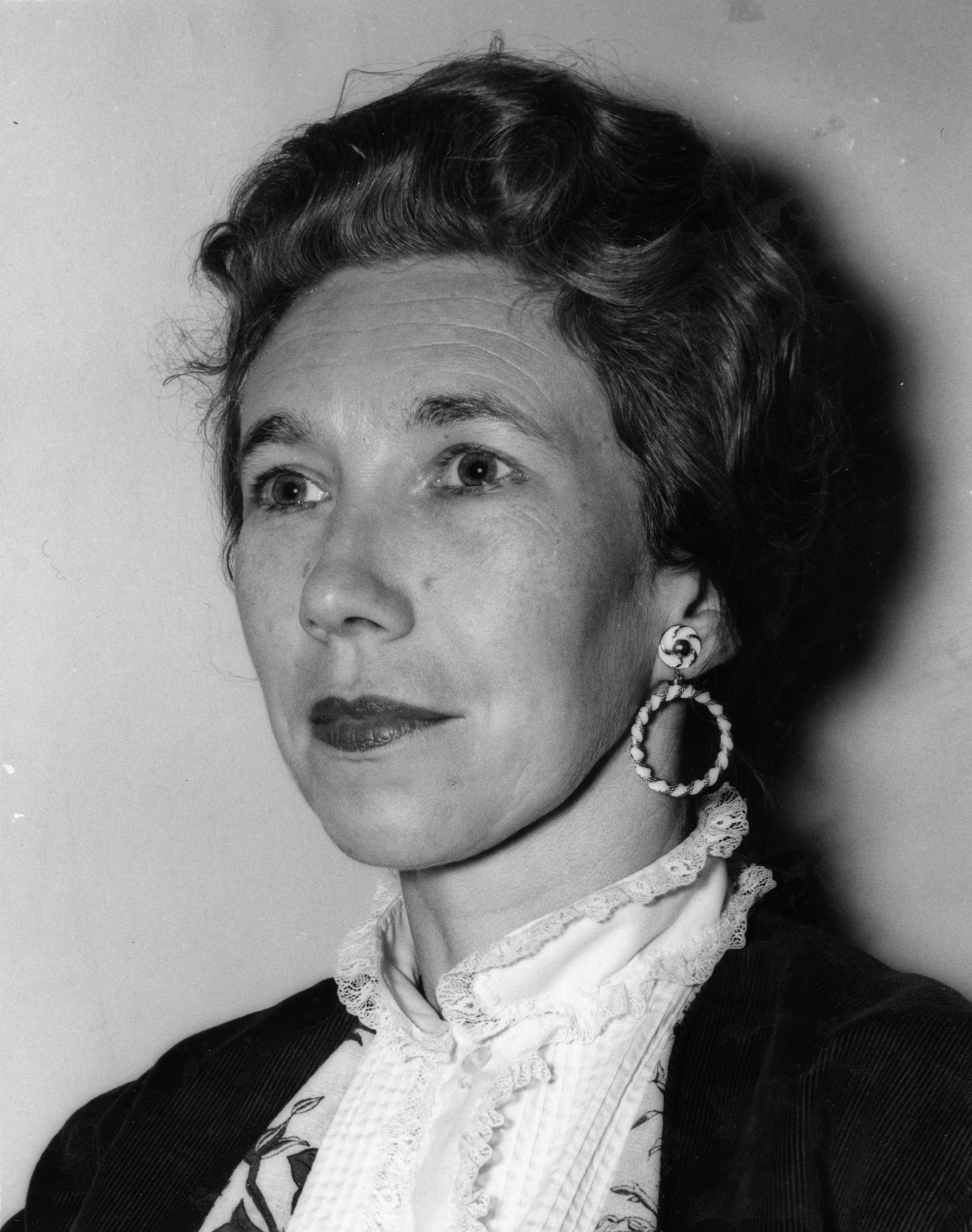
- Sandra L. Myres, circa 1980s
- Born: 17 May 1933; Columbus, Ohio
- Died: 16 October 1991 (aged 58)
- Education: Texas Technological College (B.A., M.A.); Texas Christian University (Ph.D)
- Occupation: Historian
- Spouse: Charles E. Myres

Sandra Myres, née Swickard (17 May 1933 – 16 October 1991), was an American historian of the American Southwest.

== Life and work ==
Sandra L. Myres was born in Columbus, Ohio, on 17 May 1933, to George and Lillian (Stockdale) Swickard. She attended Rice University in 1950–51 before marrying Charles E. Myres, a chemist, in 1953. She went back to school and earned her B.A. in biology from Texas Technological College in 1957. Myres followed that up with a master's degree in history in 1960 and then taught history in Kerrville, Texas in 1960–61. She published S.D. Myres, Saddlemaker privately in 1961 and then earned a Ph.D. from Texas Christian University in 1967. The next year, Myres published Force Without Fanfare and then became an assistant professor of history at the University of Texas at Arlington. By 1971, when she was promoted to associate professor, she had written, contributed to or edited four more books. Myers edited, together with Margaret F. Morris, Essays on U.S. Foreign Relations in 1974. Two years later she contributed to Broken Treaties and Forked Tongues. Myres was president of the Western History Association in 1987–88 and wrote Westering Women and the Frontier Experience during that time, a History Book Club selection. She died on 16 October 1991.
