= On the Trail of Negro Folk-songs =

1925 book by Dorothy Scarborough

On the Trail of Negro Folk-Songs
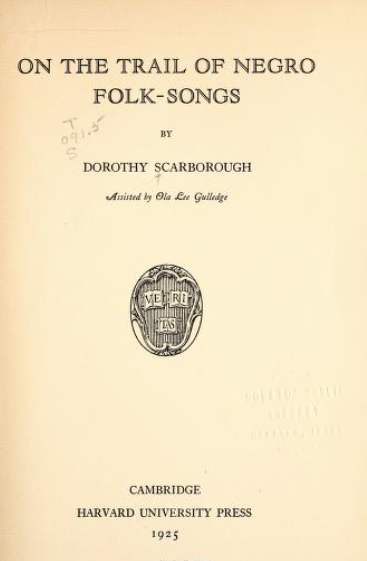
- Title page for On the Trail of Negro Folk-songs (1925)
- Author: Dorothy Scarborough
- Language: English
- Subject: African-American folk songs
- Publisher: Harvard University Press
- Publication date: 1925
- Publication place: United States

On the Trail of Negro Folk-Songs is a non-fiction book by Dorothy Scarborough. It was first published in 1925. The book, a survey of African American folk songs, has been reprinted several times.

The book focuses on secular songs, that is, songs without any kind of religious message or origin. It was one of the first studies to focus solely on secular songs and weaves between analysis of the music and anecdotes from Scarborough and the people who introduced the songs to her.

== History ==
On the Trail of Negro Folk-Songs was published by Harvard University Press in September of 1925. The book was written primarily by Scarborough with assistance from Ola Lee Gulledge, a pianist and former professor at Oklahoma Baptist University. It was republished in the 1960s by Folklore Associates.

== Reception ==
The initial printing of On the Trail of Negro Folk-Songs was positively received by scholars. The Sewanee Review noted that Scarborough presented African American folk songs as "the greatest poetry-producing force in American life" and that her material was presented sympathetically. A review of the book in Poetry praised Scarborough for her blend of entertainment and scholarship and for highlighting the beauty of African American folk songs. The Journal of American Folklore was critical of some of the book's claims, especially relating to the origins of various songs, but wrote positively of her selections. Robert E. Park noted that On the Trail of Negro Folk-Songs was unique for being an entirely secular collection, with no religious songs, and praised her "intimate and chatty" prose. A review by Lowry Charles Wimberly in American Speech was relatively critical, noting that many of the songs Scarborough chose to include were not original African American developments and that she had categorized many songs from their respective genres.

The book received continued positive reception upon its re-release in the 1960s. Ed Cray described it as "the product of innocent happier days" and criticized Scarborough's categorization and commentary as mostly uncritical, although he recommended it as a "quaint period piece." Ethnomusicology acknowledged some of the book's shortcomings but wrote that it served as an important archetype for later scholarship. Positive reviews were also published in the Journal of American Folklore and Notes.
