= Dorothy Scarborough =

American novelist (1878–1935)

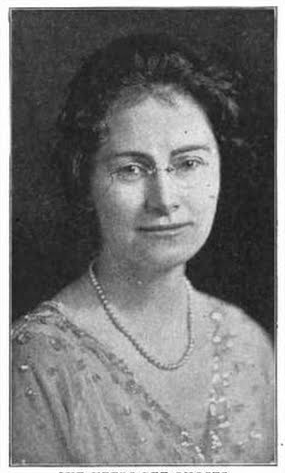
- Dorothy Scarborough, from a 1918 publication.
- Born: January 27, 1878; Mount Carmel, Texas
- Died: November 7, 1935 (aged 57); New York City
- Occupations: Writer; professor; literary critic
- Writing career
- Notable work: The Wind
- Literary movement: American folklore

Emily Dorothy Scarborough (January 27, 1878 – November 7, 1935) was an American writer who wrote about Texas, folk culture, cotton farming, ghost stories and women's life in the Southwest. She was an assistant professor at Columbia University in creative writing, and numerous students of hers went on to become well-published and respected authors.

== Early life ==
Scarborough was born in Smith County, Texas, the daughter of Judge John B. Scarborough and his wife, Mary Adelaide. At the age of four she moved to Sweetwater, Texas for her mother's health, as her mother needed the drier climate. The family soon left Sweetwater in 1887, so that the Scarborough children could get a good education at Baylor College.

== Academics and writing ==
Even though Scarborough's writings are identified with Texas, she studied at University of Chicago and Oxford University and, beginning in 1916, taught literature at Columbia University.

While receiving her PhD from Columbia, she wrote a dissertation, "The Supernatural in Modern English Fiction". Sylvia Ann Grider writes in a critical introduction that the dissertation "was so widely acclaimed by her professors and colleagues that it was published and it has become a basic reference work".

Dorothy Scarborough came in contact with many writers in New York, including Edna Ferber and Vachel Lindsay. She taught creative writing classes at Columbia. Among her creative writing students were Eric Walrond and Carson McCullers, who took her first college writing class from Scarborough. "Sometimes I wish I could give up writing so that I might have more time to teach," she said in 1930, "and sometimes I wish I could give up teaching to have more time to write. But each one is necessary to the complete enjoyment of the other."

Her most critically acclaimed book, The Wind (first published anonymously in 1925), was later made into a film of the same name starring Lillian Gish.

== Bibliography ==
=== Original works ===
- Fugitive Verses (1912), original verses
- The Supernatural in Modern English Fiction (1917); available in its entirety at Google Book Search
- From a Southern Porch (1919), viewable in full at Google Book Search or viewable at the Portal to Texas History
- Humorous Ghost Stories (1921) Free download from Project Gutenberg
- In the Land of Cotton (1923)
- The Wind (1925), considered her most acclaimed work.
- The Unfair Sex (serialized, 1925–26)
- Impatient Griselda (1927)
- Can't Get a Redbird (1929)
- Stretch-Berry Smile (1932)
- The Story of Cotton (1933) juvenile reader
- Selected Short Stories of Today (1935)

=== Folklore ===
- On the Trail of Negro Folk-songs (1925) available at archive.org
- Song Catcher in Southern Mountains; American Folk Songs of British Ancestry (1937, posthumous)

=== Biographical and critical essays ===
Biographical Essay on the Handbook of Texas Online Foreword to The Wind by Sylvia Ann Grider, Barker Texas History Center series, University of Texas Press, 1979.

== Sources ==
- Dorothy Scarborough from the Handbook of Texas Online
