= Sylvia Grider =

American folklorist (born 1940)

- Born: 1940 (age 85–86); Pampa, Texas, United States
- Education: University of Texas at Austin (MA); Indiana University (PhD)

Sylvia Ann Grider (born 1940) is an American folklorist, noted for her research into such topics as ghosts, child lore, and the memorialization of tragic events.

She served as president of the American Folklore Society, from 1993–1994.

== Early life and education ==
Grider was born in Pampa, Texas, in 1940. She attended Pampa High School, graduating in 1959.

Through a Cabot Scholarship, she attended the University of Texas at Austin, graduating with a BA in Latin in 1963 and then a MA in history (with a minor in classical civilization) in 1967. Between these degrees, she taught at Caprock High School in Amarillo, Texas.

During her time at the University of Texas at Austin, Grider took part in an archaeological excavation of Corinth in Greece. Grider later credited her time in Greece with inadvertently inspiring her interest in folklore, feeling that “the folktales and legends that the Greek workmen told were much more exciting...than the excavation”.

Grider taught at N. R. Crozier Technical High School in Dallas before undertaking a PhD at the Folklore Institute at Indiana University, which she completed in 1976.

== Career ==
Grider joined Texas A&M University in 1976. She taught Folklore classes in the departments of English, History, and Humanities in Medicine. She was Assistant Dean of the Graduate College from 1981 to 1984 and would later be based in the Department of Anthropology from 1988 to 2007.

== Aggie Bonfire ==
After the fatal collapse of the Aggie Bonfire in 1999, Grider directed the university's Bonfire Memorabilia Collection Project, documenting and archiving all of the shrines to the bonfire that were created on the A&M campus.

== Recognition ==
Grider has served as president of the Texas Folklore Society, president of the American Folklore Society, and as delegate to the American Council of Learned Studies.

== Selected publications ==
- Grider, Sylvia Ann (1975). "Con Safos: Mexican-Americans, Names and Graffiti". The Journal of American Folklore. 88 (348): 132–142. doi:10.2307/539192. ISSN 0021-8715.
- Grider, Sylvia Ann (1975). "The Shotgun House in Oil Boomtowns of The Texas Panhandle". Pioneer America. 7 (2): 47–55. ISSN 0032-0005.
- Grider, Sylvia Ann (1980). "The Study of Children's Folklore". Western Folklore. 39 (3): 159–169. doi:10.2307/1499798. ISSN 0043-373X.
- Grider, Sylvia Ann (1980). "A Select Bibliography of Childlore". Western Folklore. 39 (3): 248–265. ISSN 0043-373X.
- Grider, Sylvia (1995). "Passed down from Generation to Generation: Folklore and Teaching". The Journal of American Folklore. 108 (428): 178–185. doi:10.2307/541378. ISSN 0021-8715.
- Grider, Sylvia Ann (1997), Tuleja, Tad (ed.), "How Texans Remember the Alamo", Usable Pasts, Traditions and Group Expressions in North America, University Press of Colorado, pp. 274–290, doi:10.2307/j.ctt46nrkh.19, ISBN 978-0-87421-225-9, retrieved 2022-02-17
- Grider, Sylvia Ann and Rodenberger, Lou Halsell (eds.) (1997) Texas women writers : a tradition of their own. (1st ed.). College Station: Texas A & M University Press. 1997. ISBN 0-89096-752-0. OCLC 36379809.
- Grider, Sylvia (2001). "Spontaneous Shrines: A Modern Response to Tragedy and Disaster Update note: 3/1/02". New Directions in Folklore. 5. ISSN 2161-9964.
- Grider, Sylvia Ann and Rodenberger, Lou Halsell (eds.) (2003) Let's hear it : stories by Texas women writers. College Station: Texas A & M University Press. 2003. ISBN 1-58544-278-X. OCLC 51905754.
- Goldstein, Diane E., Grider, Sylvia Ann, Thomas, Jeannie B. (2007). Haunting experiences: ghosts in contemporary folklore. Logan, Utah: Utah State University Press. ISBN 978-0-87421-681-3. OCLC 568141880.
- Grider, Sylvia (2007). "Public Grief and the Politics of Memorial: Contesting the Memory of 'the Shooters' at Columbine High School". Anthropology Today. 23 (3): 3–7. ISSN 0268-540X.
- Grider, S. (2011). Memorializing Shooters with Their Victims: Columbine, Virginia Tech, Northern Illinois University. In P. J. Margry & C. Sánchez-Carretero (Eds.), Grassroots Memorials: The Politics of Memorializing Traumatic Death (1st ed., pp. 108–142). Berghahn Books.
