= Edward Leffingwell =

American art critic and curator

Edward G. Leffingwell (December 3, 1941 – August 5, 2014), was an American art critic and curator, affiliated with MoMA/P.S.1 and Art in America and associated with avant-garde art.

== Biography ==
Leffingwell was born in Sharon, Pennsylvania, on December 3, 1941. In the mid-1960s he moved to New York City and began associating with Max's Kansas City and the Warhol Factory crowd. During the 1960s and 1970s he was involved with a variety of avant-garde art projects, including a 1968 film by sculptor John Chamberlain ("The Secret Life of Hernando Cortez").

In the late 1970s Leffingwell left New York to take care of his mother, who was ill, and began to transition to a curatorial career in the arts. He entered Youngstown State University, completing a B.A. in 1982, and went on in 1984 to earn an M.A. in art history from the University of Cincinnati.

In 1985 he was hired by PS1, now affiliated with New York's Museum of Modern Art.

Leffingwell organized a number of key exhibitions, including two while he was in school. His first exhibition, in 1983, was at the Butler: "Chinese Chance: An American Collection", which profiled the collection of Leffingwell's long-time associate, Mickey Ruskin, who had been one of the owners of Max's Kansas City. His next major exhibition was at the University of Cincinnati, reviewing Lawrence Weiner, a conceptual artist.

Over the next several years Leffingwell organized several significant shows. In New York, he developed a 20-year retrospective of sculptor John McCracken ("John McCracken: Heroic Stance") and a 1987 show of artist Michael Tracy ("Michael Tracy: Terminal Privileges"). In 1997 at P.S.1 he organized a retrospective of the work of artist and filmmaker Jack Smith ("Jack Smith: Flaming Creature: His Amazing Life and Times"). He also organized a show on James Rosenquist, and "About Place: Contemporary American Landscape" (1986).

Leffingwell spent four years in Los Angeles, directing the Los Angeles Municipal Art Gallery at Barnsdall Park from 1988 to 1992. There he organized an exhibition of George Herms, and a proposed biennial show, LAX: The Los Angeles Exhibition, a contemporary art exhibition spanning seven to eight institutions.

During this time Leffingwell became interested in and associated with Brazilian art and the São Paulo Art Biennial. For that biennial, he organized a show on the painter Neil Williams, one of long-time friends and associates.

Leffingwell wrote prolifically, penning hundreds of reviews and critical essays for Art in America, as well as contributing to scholarship on artist Lawrence Weiner, photographer Joe Deal, artist Judith Murray, Claude Monet and Jack Smith.

Leffingwell died from cardiac arrest in Flushing, Queens, on August 5, 2014, at the age of 72, after suffering from Parkinson's disease.

== Biography ==
- Lawrence Weiner: AS FAR AS THE EYE CAN SEE (1960-2007) (2007)
- From Vibrato to Legato: Judith Murray (2006)
- Mario Cravo Neto: Laroye (2002)
- Flaming Creature: The Life and Time of Jack Smith, Artist, Performer, Exotic Consultant (1997)
