= King of the Witches =

King of the Witches may refer to:

- Simon, King of the Witches
- Witch-king of Angmar
- Zhengyi
- King of Galicia
