= Andrew Prine =

American actor (1936–2022)

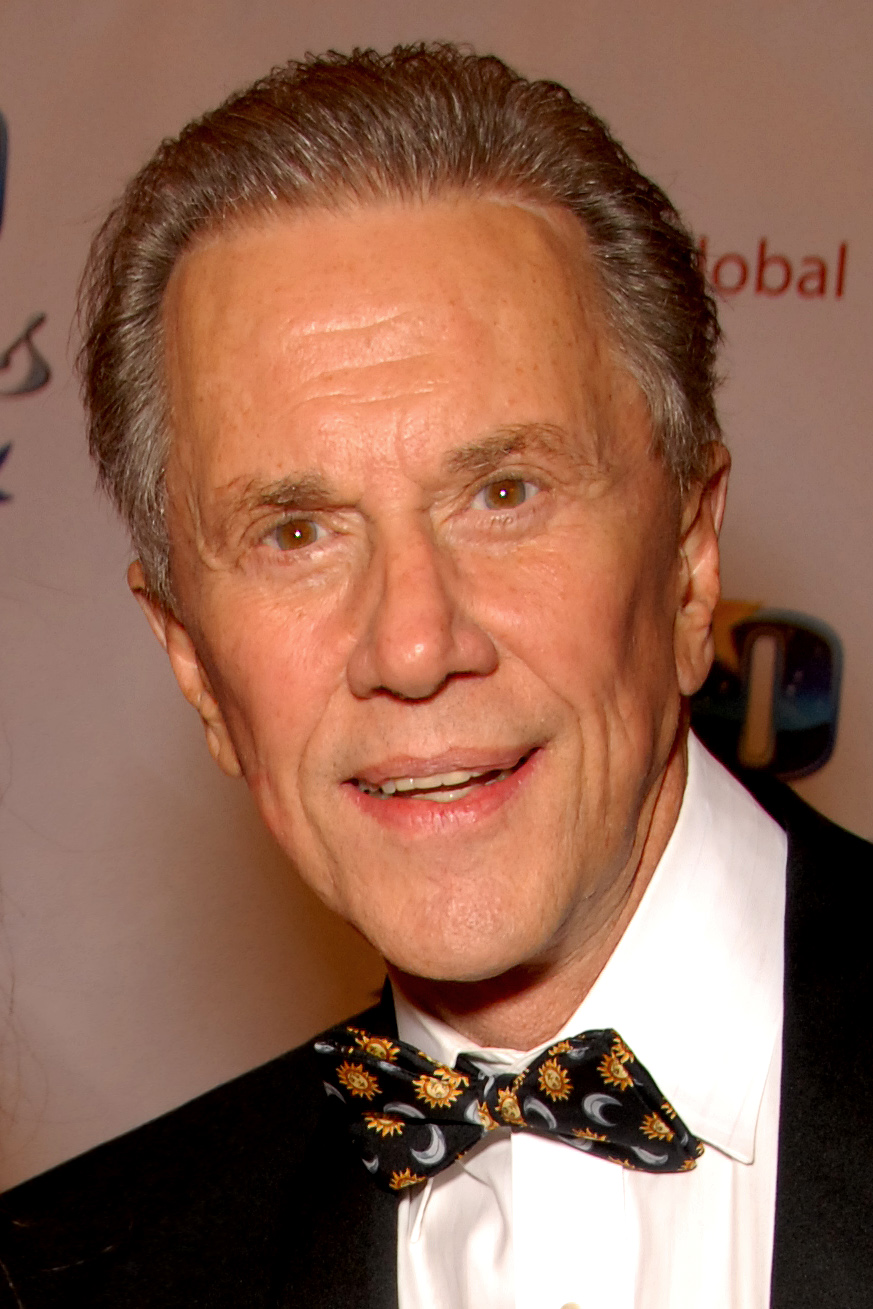
- Prine in 2010
- Born: Andrew Lewis Prine; February 14, 1936; Jennings, Florida, U.S.
- Died: October 31, 2022 (aged 86); Paris, France
- Education: Miami Jackson Senior High School
- Alma mater: Actors Studio
- Occupation: Actor
- Years active: 1957–2015
- Spouses: Sharon Farrell (m. 1963; div. 1963) Brenda Scott (m. 1965; div. 1966) (m. 1968; div. 1969) (m. 1973; div. 1978) Heather Lowe (m. 1986)

Andrew Lewis Prine (February 14, 1936 – October 31, 2022) was an American actor. He had a prolific career spanning from the 1950s through the 2010s, appearing in over 180 film and television productions, and was well known for his roles in Westerns.

== Early life and education ==
Prine was born in 1936, in Jennings, Florida. He was raised in a farming community, and graduated from Miami Jackson Senior High School. He attended the University of Miami on a theater scholarship, but dropped out and headed to New York to pursue acting, enrolling at the Actors Studio.

== Career ==
=== Early performances ===
In the mid-1950s, Prine was a "starving" stage actor in New York City. He made his professional debut in an episode of United States Steel Hour in 1957. Aged 22, he was then cast as the lead in the Broadway production of Thomas Wolfe's Look Homeward, Angel. Adapted by playwright Ketti Frings, the play opened at the Ethel Barrymore Theatre on November 28, 1957. In 1958, Prine was brought in as a replacement for Anthony Perkins. It ran for a total of 564 performances and closed on April 4, 1959. The production was a critical success. it won 1958 Best American Play and was nominated for several Tony Awards.

Prine left Broadway in pursuit of film acting after he realized the greater pay difference between stage and screen work. From 1959, he was cast in a series of small roles for television. In 1962, Prine was cast in the Academy Award-nominated film The Miracle Worker as Helen Keller's older brother James. He had fond memories of his co-star Anne Bancroft, who was dating Mel Brooks at the time.

=== Westerns and television: 1960s ===
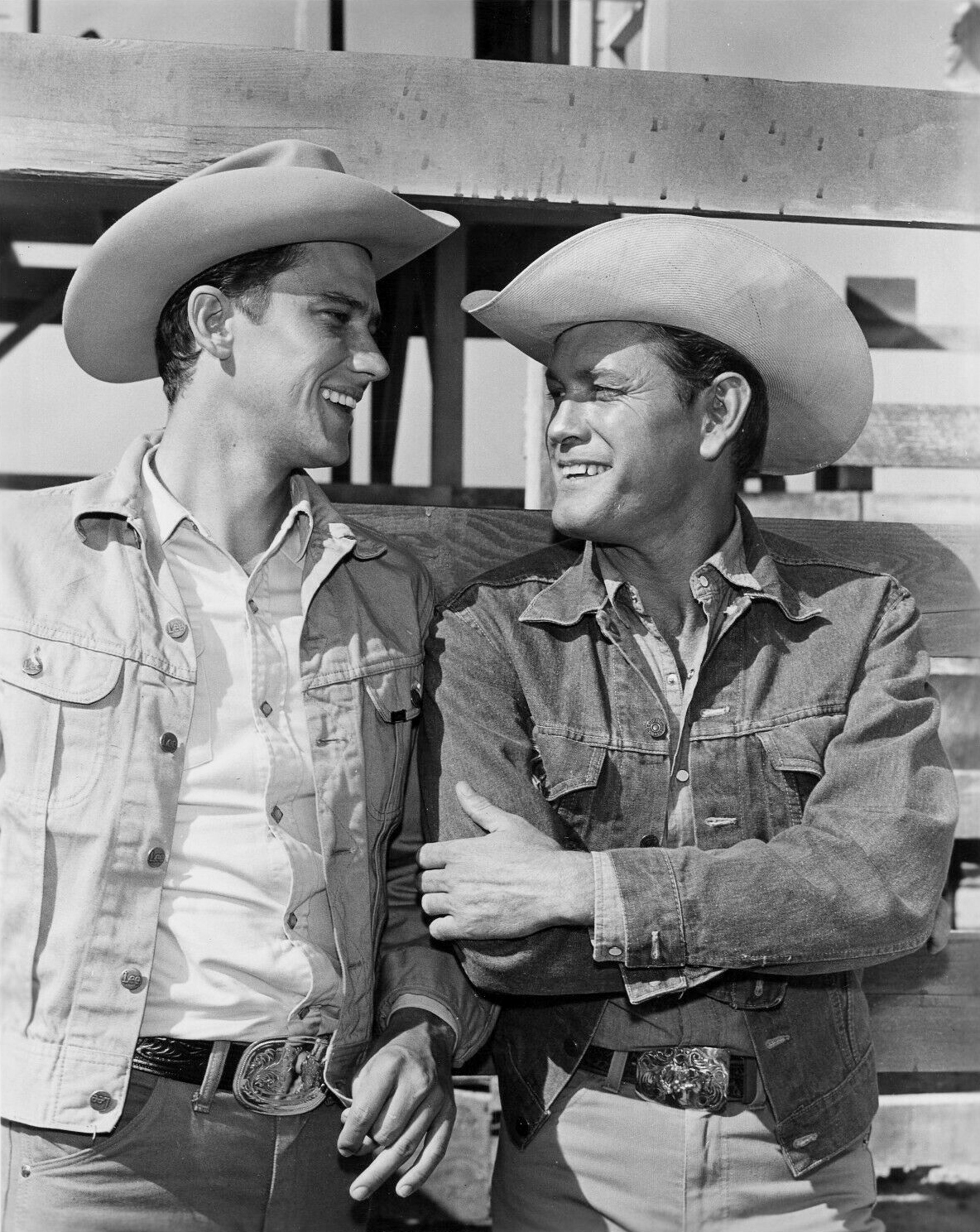
Prine and Earl Holliman in a publicity shot for Wide Country

In 1962, Prine landed the lead role of Andy Guthrie with Earl Holliman in the 28-episode NBC series Wide Country, a drama about two brothers who are rodeo performers that aired between 1962 and 1963. He learnt from rodeo performer and technical advisor Slim Pickens. Prine later credited Holliman for the quality of the series, in terms of rewriting the script and his dedication. After the cancellation of Wide Country, Prine continued to work throughout the 1960s in such Western television series as Gunsmoke, Bonanza, The Virginian, and Wagon Train.

His other television appearances included the non-Western series Dr. Kildare, Cannon, Combat!, and Twelve O'Clock High. He played Dr. Richard Kimble's brother Ray in a notable first-season episode of The Fugitive.

In the late 1960s, Prine appeared in three prominent films made by director Andrew V. McLaglen: The Devil's Brigade (1968) with William Holden, Bandolero! (1968) with Jimmy Stewart, Dean Martin and Raquel Welch, and Chisum (1970) with John Wayne. Prine allegedly had a youthful, egotistical attitude. Nobody intimidated him with the exception of Wayne. Out of all the films in his career, Prine confessed that the Westerns were his personal favorite.

=== Horror and television: 1970s–1980s ===
During the 1970s and 1980s, Prine worked steadily in film and television. These included roles in Baretta, Barnaby Jones, Hawaii Five-O, The Bionic Woman, W.E.B., Dallas, and the science-fiction miniseries V and its sequel V: The Final Battle.

Prine appeared in a succession of cult horror films including Simon, King of the Witches (1971), Hannah, Queen of the Vampires (1973), Terror Circus (1973), The Centerfold Girls (1974), The Town That Dreaded Sundown (1976), Grizzly (1976), The Evil (1978), and Amityville II: The Possession (1982).

=== Later years: 1990s–2010s ===
During the 1990s, Prine continued to work in film and television. His appearances included Weird Science and Star Trek: The Next Generation.

Prine worked with director Quentin Tarantino on an Emmy-winning episode of CSI: Crime Scene Investigation and in Saving Grace with Holly Hunter, Boston Legal, and Six Feet Under, in addition to feature films with Johnny Knoxville. The Encore Western Channel has featured him on Conversations with Andrew Prine, interviewing Hollywood actors such as Eli Wallach, Harry Carey, Jr., and Patrick Wayne, and film makers such as Mark Rydell with behind-the-scenes anecdotes.

=== Stage ===
A life member of the Actors Studio, Prine's stage work includes Long Day's Journey into Night with Charlton Heston and Deborah Kerr, The Caine Mutiny Court-Martial, directed by Henry Fonda, and A Distant Bell on Broadway.

== Accolades ==
In 2001, Prine received the Golden Boot Award for his body of work in Westerns and two Dramalogue Critics Awards for Best Actor in a leading role.

== Personal life ==
Prine married his first wife, actress Sharon Farrell in 1963. The couple divorced the same year, reportedly after only living together for one month and ten days.

He married his second wife, actress Brenda Scott, in 1965. The couple had multiple remarriages and divorces before they remarried a third time, which lasted from 1973 to 1978.

In 1986, Prine married his third wife, actress-producer Heather Lowe. The couple were together 36 years until his death in 2022.

=== Karyn Kupcinet ===
Prine, Irv Kupcinet and Karyn Kupcinet

Karyn Kupcinet and Prine met on the set of Wide Country in December 1962 and began dating in 1963. The relationship was problematic; Kupcinet was abusing diet pills along with other prescription drugs.

Prine told Kupcinet that he was newly divorced, dating other girls, and not interested in an exclusive relationship. After Kupcinet said she underwent an illegal abortion in July 1963, the relationship cooled further. Prine continued dating other women. In turn, Kupcinet began spying on Prine and his girlfriends. The police were called to Prine's home one afternoon when he and his date heard a burglar in the attic. Kupcinet was found in the house and no charges were filed.

After Kupcinet's death, The Los Angeles County Sheriff's Department and the FBI examined threatening letters that Prine had received; Kupcinet told Prine she had also been sent the exact same kind of threats, with letters cut out of magazine headlines and newspaper headlines. Sheriff's Department investigators suggested they were probably pranks. The FBI later determined Kupcinet had delivered to Prine and herself the threatening and profane messages. Her fingerprints were discovered on Scotch tape during the investigation by the FBI and the Sheriff’s Department. The Scotch tape had fastened the messages to the front door of Prine’s house and the door to Kupcinet’s apartment.

On November 30, 1963, Kupcinet was found dead in her apartment at the age of 22. The coroner concluded that she had been strangled because of a broken hyoid bone in her throat. Her death was ruled a homicide.

During the course of an investigation, the Los Angeles County Sheriff's Department said Prine voluntarily worked with investigators when questioned. Prine said he had talked with Kupcinet twice by phone on Wednesday, the day before her murder, when he was trying to resolve an issue she had brought up during the first of their telephone conversations. She told Prine a baby had been abandoned on the doorstep of her apartment. He told her to call the police and later followed up with another call to see if she had contacted the authorities.

In addition to Prine, during the investigation both Edward Rubin and Robert Hathaway, the two men who had been at Kupcinet’s apartment during the night of her death and possibly had been the last people to see her alive, were named as suspects.

In 1988, Kupcinet's father Irv Kupcinet published a memoir in which he revealed that he and his wife Essee believed that Prine had nothing to do with their daughter's murder. He was suspicious of a person, still alive when he wrote his memoir, who had no connection to Prine. Irv Kupcinet named David Lange, a neighbor of his daughter and brother to actress Hope Lange, who had twice confessed to friends he was guilty. When questioned, Lange suggested that he had been joking. However, when a girlfriend who was with Lange in his apartment, located directly below Karyn Kupcinet’s unit, told him about the police activity there, he told her adamantly to close the drapes and keep quiet. She thought his demeanor was strange because he often had been in Kupcinet’s apartment.

== Death ==
Prine died of natural causes while on vacation in Paris, France, on October 31, 2022, at the age of 86.

== Filmography ==
=== Film ===
- Kiss Her Goodbye (1959) as Kenneth 'Kenny' Grimes
- The Miracle Worker (1962) as James Keller
- Advance to the Rear (1964) as Private Owen Selous
- Texas Across the River (1966) as Lieutenant Sibley
- The Devil's Brigade (1968) as Private Theodore Ransom
- Bandolero! (1968) as Deputy Sheriff Roscoe Bookbinder
- This Savage Land (1969) (TV movie) as Timothy Pride
- Generation a.k.a. A Time for Caring, A Time for Giving (1969) as Winn Garand
- Along Came a Spider (1970) (TV movie) as Sam Howard
- Chisum (1970) as Alex McSween
- Lost Flight (1970) (TV movie) as Jonesy
- Night Slaves (1970) (TV movie) as Fess Beany / Noel
- Simon, King of the Witches (1971) as Simon Sinestrari
- Squares a.k.a. Honky Tonk Cowboy, Riding Tall (1972) as Austin Ruth
- Another Part of the Forest (1972, TV movie) as Oscar Hubbard
- Crypt of the Living Dead a.k.a. La tumba de la isla maldita, Vampire Women (1973) as Chris Bolton
- One Little Indian (1973) as Chaplain
- Wonder Woman (1974) (TV movie) as George Calvin
- Nightmare Circus (1974) as Andre
- Centerfold Girls (1974) as Clement Dunne
- Rooster Cogburn (1975) as Fiona's Husband (uncredited)
- The Deputies a.k.a. The Law of the Land (1976) (TV movie) as Travis Carrington
- Grizzly (1976) as Don Stober
- The Winds of Autumn (1976) as Wire Hankins
- The Town That Dreaded Sundown (1976) as Deputy Norman Ramsey
- Tail Gunner Joe (1977) (TV movie) as Peter Parker McNair Gates
- The Last of the Mohicans (1977) (TV movie) as Major Heyward
- Christmas Miracle in Caufield, U.S.A. a.k.a. The Christmas Coal Mine Miracle (1977) (TV movie) as Arthur
- The Evil (1978) as Professor Raymond Guy
- Abe Lincoln: Freedom Fighter (1978) as Luke
- Donner Pass: The Road to Survival (1978) (TV movie) as Lewis Keyser
- Mind Over Murder (1979) (TV movie) as Bald Man
- M Station: Hawaii (1980) (TV movie) as Captain Ben Galloway
- Callie & Son a.k.a. Callie and Son a.k.a. Rags to Riches (1981) (TV movie) as Kimball Smythe
- A Small Killing (1981) (TV movie) as Lieutenant Ward Arlen
- Amityville II: The Possession (1982) as Father Tom
- They're Playing with Fire (1984) as Michael Stevens
- No Earthly Reason (1984) (TV movie) as Mr. Morrison
- And the Children Shall Lead a.k.a. Wonderworks: And the Children Shall Lead (1985) (TV movie) as Sheriff Connelly
- Eliminators (1986) as Harry Fontana
- Chill Factor (1989) as Kioshe Jones
- Mission of the Shark: The Saga of the U.S.S. Indianapolis (1991) (TV movie) as Henshaw
- Life on the Edge (1992) as Dr. Roger Hardy
- Deadly Exposure (1993) as Richard Anthony
- Scattered Dreams a.k.a. Scattered Dreams: The Kathryn Messenger Story (1993) as Sandstrom
- Gettysburg (1993) as Brigadier General Richard B. Garnett
- Wolfridge (1994) as Jack Haig
- Without Evidence (1995) as John Nelson
- Serial Killer (1995) as Perry Jones
- The Dark Dancer (1995) as Dr. Paul Orenstein
- The Avenging Angel (1995) (TV movie) as Andrew Pike
- The Shadow Men (1998) as MIB #1
- Possums (1998) as Mayor Charlie Lawton
- The Boy with the X-Ray Eyes a.k.a. X-Ray Boy, X-treme Teens (1999) as Malcolm Baker
- Witchouse 2: Blood Coven (2000) as Sheriff Jake Harmon / Angus Westmore
- James Dean (2001) (TV movie)
- Critical Mass (2001) as Senator Cook
- Sweet Home Alabama (2002) as Sheriff Holt (uncredited)
- Gods and Generals (2003) as Brigadier General Richard B. Garnett (uncredited)
- Glass Trap (2005) as Sheriff Ed
- The Dukes of Hazzard (2005) as Angry Man
- Hell to Pay (2005) as Matt Elden
- Daltry Calhoun (2005) as Sheriff Cabot
- Hollis & Rae (2006) (TV movie) as Percy Chandler
- Sutures (2009) as Dr. Hopkins
- Treasure of the Black Jaguar (2010) as Andrew Prine
- Lords of Salem (2012) as Reverend Jonathan Hawthorne
- Beyond the Farthest Star (2015) as Senator John Cutter

=== Television ===
- The United States Steel Hour (1957) (Season 5 Episode 8: "Little Charlie Don't Want a Saddle") as Elmo Hare
- Playhouse 90 (1960) (Season 4 Episode 12: "Tomorrow") as Isham
- Tombstone Territory (1960) (Season 3 Episode 25: "Revenge is a Lady") as Noah Bell
- Alcoa Presents: One Step Beyond (1960) (Season 2 Episode 31: "The Peter Hurkos Story: Part 2") as Walter Bird
- Overland Trail (1960) (Season 1 Episode 13: "Sour Annie") as Hank Paulson
- Peter Gunn (1960) (Season 2 Episode 35: "Letter of the Law") as Neil Lockwood
- The DuPont Show of the Month (1961) (Season 4 Episode 6: "The Lincoln Murder Case")
- Have Gun — Will Travel (1960–1961) (2 episodes)
  - (Season 4 Episode 11: "The Marshal's Boy") (1960) as Billy Lamport
  - (Season 4 Episode 24: "Fandango") (1961) as Bobby Olson
- Alcoa Premiere (1961–1962) (2 episodes)
  - (Season 1 Episode 9: "The End of a World") (1961) as Gavril Princip
  - (Season 1 Episode 18: "Second Chance") (1962) as Andy Guthrie
- Alfred Hitchcock Presents (1962) (Season 7 Episode 17: "The Faith of Aaron Menefee") as Aaron Menefee
- The Defenders (1962) (Season 1 Episode 20: "The Point Shaver") as Jim Wilkinson
- The New Breed (1962) (Season 1 Episode 27: "Echoes of Hate") as Werner Muelich
- Ben Casey (1962) (Season 1 Episode 30: "An Uncommonly Innocent Killing") as Jeff Billstrom
- The Wide Country (1962–1963) (28 episodes) as Andy Guthrie
- Vacation Playhouse (1963) (Season 1 Episode 9: "Come a-Runnin'") as Ernie Watson
- Gunsmoke (1962–1963) (3 episodes)
  - (Season 7 Episode 33: "The Prisoner") (1962) as Billy Joe
  - (Season 8 Episode 5: "False Front") (1962) as Clay Tatum
  - (Season 9 Episode 5: "Easy Come") (1963) as Elmo Sippy
- The Lieutenant (1963) (Season 1 Episode 11: "Fall from a White Horse") as Lieutenant Gerald Allison
- The Great Adventure (1963) (Season 1 Episode 9: "The Outlaw and the Nun") as Billy the Kid
- Dr. Kildare (1963–1965) (7 episodes)
  - (Season 3 Episode 5: "A Game for Three") (1963) as Dr. Louis Miller
  - (Season 4 Episode 12: "Catch a Crooked Mouse") (1964) as John Bardeman
  - (Season 5 Episode 5: "The Bell in the Schoolhouse Tolls for Thee, Kildare") (1965) as Dr. Roger Helvick
  - (Season 5 Episode 6: "Life in the Dance Hall") (1965) as Dr. Roger Helvick
  - (Season 5 Episode 7: "Some Doors are Slamming") (1965) as Dr. Roger Helvick
  - (Season 5 Episode 8: "Enough La Boheme for Everybody") (1965) as Dr. Roger Helvick
  - (Season 5 Episode 9: "Now the Mummy") (1965) as Dr. Roger Helvick
- Profiles in Courage (1964) (Season 1 Episode 7: "John Adams") as Josiah Quincy
- Wagon Train (1964–1965) (2 episodes)
  - (Season 8 Episode 1: "The Bob Stuart Story") (1964) as Felix Colton
  - (Season 8 Episode 17: "The Isaiah Quickfox Story") (1965) as Eric Camden
- Twelve O'Clock High (1964–1965) (2 episodes)
  - (Season 1 Episode 2: "Follow the Leader") (1964) as Lieutenant Robert Mellon
  - (Season 2 Episode 13: "The Jones Boys") (1965) as Lieutenant Jaydee Jones
- The Fugitive (1964–1965) (2 episodes)
  - (Season 1 Episode 15: "Home is the Hunted") (1964) as Ray Kimble
  - (Season 3 Episode 14: "End of the Line") (1965) as Neil Hollis
- Combat! (1965) (Season 3 Episode 29: "Billy the Kid") as Lieutenant William Benton
- Kraft Suspense Theatre (1965) (Season 2 Episode 24: "The Long Ravine") as Chris Sandee
- Bonanza (1965) (Season 6 Episode 32: "Jonah") as George Whitman
- Convoy (1965) (Season 1 Episode 8: "Admiral Do-Right") as Tillman
- The Virginian (1965–1969) (5 episodes)
  - (Season 3 Episode 18: "Hideout") (1965) as Clint Evers
  - (Season 4 Episode 1: "The Brothers") (1965) as Will Denning
  - (Season 4 Episode 29: "A Bald-Faced Boy") (1966) as Brett Benton
  - (Season 5 Episode 29: "The Strange Quest of Claire Bingham") (1967) as Chuck Larson
  - (Season 8 Episode 4: "The Power Seekers") (1969) as Tobe Larkin
- Tarzan (1966) (Season 1 Episode 2: "The Ultimate Weapon") as Peter Haines
- The Road West (1966–1967) (all 29 episodes) as Timothy Pride
- The Invaders (1967) (Season 2 Episode 8: "Dark Outpost") as Vern Corbett
- Insight (1967–1970) (5 episodes)
  - (Episode 156: "Stranger in My Shoes") (1967) as Jim
  - (Episode 160: "All the Plumes in Pain") (1967) as Printer
  - (Episode 193: "The World, the Campus and Sister Lucy Ann") (1967) as Matt
  - (Episode 205: "All the Things I've Never Liked") (1969) as Eliot
  - (Episode 323: "Cry of Terror") (1970) as Tuesday
- Daniel Boone (1968) (Season 4 Episode 25: "Thirty Pieces of Silver") as Amos Fargo
- The Felony Squad (1968) (Season 3 Episode 3: "Underground Nightmare") as Benjy Panosian
- Ironside (1968) (2 episodes) as Ernie Norton
  - (Season 2 Episode 2: "Split Second to an Epitaph: Part 1")
  - (Season 2 Episode 3: "Split Second to an Epitaph: Part 2")
- Lancer (1968–1970) (2 episodes)
  - (Season 1 Episode 11: "The Heart of Pony Alice") (1968) as Wilf Guthrie
  - (Season 2 Episode 17: "The Lion and the Lamb") (1970) as Gabe Lincoln
- The Name of the Game (1968–1970) (2 episodes)
  - (Season 1 Episode 14: "Pineapple Rose") (1968) as Jigger
  - (Season 2 Episode 23: "Echo of a Nightmare") (1970) as Victor Bailey
- The F.B.I. (1968–1973) (3 episodes)
  - (Season 3 Episode 24: "The Mechanized Accomplice") (1968) as Spencer Lang
  - (Season 7 Episode 1: "Death on Sunday") (1971) as Irwin Lynch
  - (Season 8 Episode 23: "Sweet Evil") (1973) as Beau Parker
- Love, American Style (1969) (Season 1 Episode 11 (Segment: "Love and the Divorce Sale") as Biff Harrison
- Matt Lincoln (1970) (Season 1 Episode 7: "Lori")
- The Most Deadly Game (1970) (Season 1 Episode 5: "Who Killed Kindness") as Clint
- Dan August (1970) (Season 1 Episode 8: "The Union Forever") as Terry Young
- The Courtship of Eddie's Father (1971) (Season 2 Episode 16: "The Hospital") as Dr. Hal 'Speed' Gould
- Cannon (1971–1974) (2 episodes)
  - (Season 1 Episode 7: "Girl in the Electric Coffin") (1971) as Paul Whitney
  - (Season 4 Episode 11: "The Sounds of Silence") (1974) as Coy
- The Delphi Bureau (1973) (Season 1 Episode 6: "The Day of Justice Project") as George-0
- Barnaby Jones (1973–1974) (2 episodes)
  - (Season 2 Episode 4: "Day of the Viper") (1973) as Jim Howard / Jim Hague
  - (Season 3 Episode 9: "Dark Homecoming") (1974) as Shine Stanfield
- Kung Fu (1974) (Season 2 Episode 12: "The Gunman") as White
- Banacek (1974) (Season 2 Episode 6: "Rocket to Oblivion") as Tom Wardlow
- Hawkins (1974) (Season 1 Episode 7: Candidate for Murder") as Peter Vall
- Dr. Simon Locke a.k.a. Police Surgeon (1974) (2 episodes)
- Amy Prentiss (1974) (Season 1 Episode 2: "The Desperate World of Jane Doe") as Mel Kay
- Kolchak: The Night Stalker (1975) (Season 1 Episode 16: "Demon in Lace") as Professor C. Evan Spate
- Barbary Coast (1975) (Season 1 Episode 2: "Crazy Cats") as Fitzgerald
- The Family Holvak (1975) (2 episodes) as Harve Jennings
  - (Season 1 Episode 5: "First Love: Part 1")
  - (Season 1 Episode 6: "First Love: Part 2")
- Baretta (1975–1976) (2 episodes)
  - (Season 1 Episode 1: "He'll Never See Daylight") (1975) as Andy
  - (Season 3 Episode 12: "Look Back in Terror") as Tommy Bishop
- Hawaii Five-O (1975–1978) (2 episodes)
  - (Season 8 Episode 4: "Target? The Lady") (1975) as Wally Hatch
  - (Season 10 Episode 23: "A Stranger in His Grave") (1978) as Richard Chadway
- Riding With Death (1976) (Season 1 Episode 1: "Smithereens") as Luther Stark
- Quincy, M.E. (1977) (Season 1 Episode 4: "Hot Ice, Cold Hearts") as Alex Kale
- Hunter (1977) (Season 1 Episode 4: "The Hit") as Arthur Hillman
- The Bionic Woman (1977) (Season 3 Episode 5: "Rodeo") as Dr. Billy Cole
- W.E.B. (1978) (all 5 episodes) as Dan Costello
- Flying High (1979) (Season 1 Episode 16: "The Challenges") as Marshall
- The Littlest Hobo (1979) (2 episodes) as Tom Malone
  - (Season 1 Episode 2: "Manhunt: Part 1")
  - (Season 1 Episode 3: "Manhunt: Part 2")
- One Day at a Time (1980) (Season 5 Episode 24: "Grecian Yearn") as Professor Kaufman
- Darkroom (1982) (Season 1 Episode 12: "Lost in Translation") as Dr. Paul Hudson
- Hart to Hart (1982) (Season 3 Episode 18: "Deep in the Heart of Dixieland") as Russell Robinson
- The Fall Guy (1983) (Season 2 Episode 19: "One Hundred Miles a Gallon") as Ed Clarke
- Boone (1983) (Season 1 Episode 7: "The Graduation") as A.W. Holly
- V a.k.a. V: The Original Miniseries (1983) (2 episodes: "Season 1 Episode 1: Part 1" and "Season 1 Episode 2: Part 2") as Steven
- V: The Final Battle (1984) (3 episodes: "Season 1 Episode 1: Part One"; "Season 1 Episode 2: Part Two"; "Season 1 Episode Three") as Steven
- Trapper John, M.D. (1984) (Season 5 Episode 14: "A Little Knife Music") as Dr. Aubrye 'Neil' Neilson
- Matt Houston (1984) (2 episodes)
  - (Season 2 Episode 22: "On the Run") as Truman Masters
  - (Season 3 Episode 1: "Wanted Man") as Peter Martin Delaney
- Cover Up (1984) (Season 1 Episode 2: "The Million Dollar Face") as Michael Dante
- Murder, She Wrote (1984–1991) (4 episodes)
  - (Season 1 Episode 5: "Lovers and Other Killers") (1984) as Professor Todd Lowery
  - (Season 3 Episode 8: "Magnum on Ice") (1986) as Victor Salyer
  - (Season 5 Episode 16: "Truck Stop") (1989) as Roscoe
  - (Season 7 Episode 17: "The Prodigal Father") (1991) as Gil Blocker
- Danger Bay (1986) (2 episodes) as Perkins
  - (Season 2 Episode 1: "A New Beginning: Part 1")
  - (Season 2 Episode 2: "A New Beginning: Part 2")
- The Law & Harry McGraw (1987) (Season 1 Episode 10: "Yankee Boodle Dandy") as Flagg
- Paradise a.k.a. Guns of Paradise (1988) (Season 1 Episode 4: "The Ghost Dance") as Brenner
- Dallas (1989) as Harrison Van Buren III
  - (Season 12 Episode 26: "Reel Life")
  - (Season 13 Episode 2: "The Leopard's Spots")
- Freddy's Nightmares a.k.a. Freddy's Nightmares - A Nightmare on Elm Street: The Series (1989) (2 episodes)
  - (Season 1 Episode 12: "The End of the World") as Agent Stears
  - (Season 2 Episode 5: "Memory Overload") as Professor Charles Windom
- In the Heat of the Night (1990) (Season 3 Episode 14: "December Days") as Richard Pooley
- Parker Lewis Can't Lose (1991) (Season 2 Episode 4: "Future Shock") as Rex Huston
- Matlock (1991) (Season 6 Episode 4: "The Nightmare") as Gil Briscoe
- FBI: The Untold Stories (1992) (Season 1 Episode 18: "Operation Lemonade") as Agent John Keary-Taylor
- Room for Two (1992) (Season 1 Episode 2: "Not Quite...Room for Two") as Reid Ellis
- Dr. Quinn, Medicine Woman (1993) (Season 1 Episode 9: "Running Ghost") as Thaddeus Birch
- Star Trek: The Next Generation (1993) (Season 6 Episode 21: "Frame of Mind") as Administrator Suna
- Married... with Children (1994) (Season 9 Episode 12: "I Want My Psycho Dad Part 1") as Psycho Dad
- Weird Science (1994–1998) (11 episodes) as Wayne Donnelly
  - (Season 2 Episode 6: "Nightmare on Chett Street") (1994)
  - (Season 3 Episode 2: "Horseradish") (1995)
  - (Season 3 Episode 5: "Lucky Suit") (1995)
  - (Season 3 Episode 7: "Hot Wheels") (1995)
  - (Season 4 Episode 10: "Chett World") (1996)
  - (Season 4 Episode 15: "It's a Wonderful Life... Without You") (1996)
  - (Season 4 Episode 19: "Gary & Wyatt's Bloodsucking Adventure") (1996)
  - (Season 4 Episode 20: "It's a Mob, Mob, Mob, Mob World") (1996)
  - (Season 4 Episode 26: "Strangers in Paradise") (1996)
  - (Season 5 Episode 8: "Bee in There") (1997) as Wayne Donnelly / Wyatt Donnelly
  - (Season 5 Episode 15: "Wicked Wish") (1998)
- Night Stand with Dick Dietrick (1995) (1 episode)
- Star Trek: Deep Space Nine (1995) (Season 3 Episode 13: "Life Support") as Legate Turrel
- University Hospital (1995) (Season 1 Episode 6: "Crisis in Unit 2-E") as Mr. Pryor
- Pointman (1995) (Season 2 Episode 6: "Going Home") as Mr. Percy
- Baywatch Nights (1996) (Season 1 Episode 13: "Payback") as Carlos Gordon
- Melrose Place (1996) (Season 4 Episode 30: "Peter's Excellent Adventure") as Dr. Tucker
- Walker, Texas Ranger a.k.a. Walker (1997) (Season 5 Episode 16: "Full Contact") as Tim Kingston
- Silk Stalkings (1997) (Season 7 Episode 2: "Ladies Man") as Conrad Malone
- JAG (1999) (Season 5 Episode 6: "Psychic Warrior") as Admiral Linden Miles
- Six Feet Under (2004) (2 episodes) as Ed Kimmel
  - (Season 4 Episode 1: "Falling into Place")
  - (Season 4 Episode 10: "The Black Forest")
- CSI: Crime Scene Investigation (2005) (2 episodes) as Rodger Stokes
  - (Season 5 Episode 24: "Grave Danger (1)")
  - (Season 5 Episode 25: "Grave Danger (2)")
- Boston Legal (2006) (Season 2 Episode 20: "Chitty Chitty Bang Bang") as Sam Wolfson
- Saving Grace (2008) (Season 2 Episode 5: "Do You Love Him?") as Everett Marshall

== Partial stage credits ==
- Mrs. Patterson (1957)
- Look Homeward, Angel (1958–59, Ethel Barrymore Theatre and 54th Street Theatre) - Eugene Gant
- Look Homeward, Angel (1959, La Jolla Playhouse) - Eugene Gant
- Borak (1960, Martinique Theater) - Lt. Robert Borak
- A Distant Bell (1960, Eugene O'Neill Theatre) - John Creighton
- The Caine Mutiny Court-Martial (1971)
- Long Day's Journey into Night (1977, Ahmanson Theatre)
- Men's Singles (1985)
- They Shoot Horses, Don't They? (2001, Greenway Court Theater) - Rocky
- Buried Child
