= Journey to Shiloh =

1968 film by William Hale

- Directed by: William Hale
- Screenplay by: Gene L. Coon
- Based on: Journey to Shiloh by Will Henry
- Produced by: Howard Christie
- Starring: James Caan; Michael Sarrazin; Brenda Scott
- Cinematography: Enzo A. Martinelli
- Edited by: Edward W. Williams
- Music by: David Gates
- Color process: Technicolor
- Production company: Universal Pictures
- Distributed by: Universal Pictures
- Release dates: May 10, 1968 (New York City); May 17, 1968 (United States)
- Running time: 101 minutes
- Country: United States
- Language: English

Journey to Shiloh is a 1968 American Western adventure film directed by William Hale and starring James Caan, Michael Sarrazin and Brenda Scott. The film is based on the novel of the same name by Will Henry first published in 1960.

== Plot ==
During the American Civil War, seven young Texans in the Confederate army, the Concho County Comanches, journey to Shiloh, Tennessee where a major battle is about to take place. Along the way they encounter many perilous adventures.

J.C. decides he no longer wants to follow Buck and takes his money and leaves. Buck finds him just as he is shot and killed by card sharks. Buck rejoins the remaining five and takes a stage to Shreveport, Louisiana, on the way picking up a run-away slave. Out of duty they deliver him to the next town's sheriff, only to see him hung on the road out of town, despite promises he would be returned to his owner.

In Shreveport, Buck meets and has sex with Gabrielle DuPrey, but leaves her to lead his men to join the Confederate Army in Richmond, Virginia.

After being forced to join Braxton Bragg's army and joining the Battle of Shiloh, Little Bit Lucket dies of disease. Todo dies of a gunshot wound, Eubie Bell dies in a mortar attack and Willie Bill is shot in the head - all but Miller and Buck are killed in the battle or die of wounds. Miller deserts and is shot by a bounty hunter and dies with Buck by his side, trapped in a barn with the army closing in on them. Before Miller dies, he encourages Buck to leave the army, go get the girl he met in Shreveport and return to Texas.

Sgt. Barnes, who had befriended the Texans, convinces Gen. Bragg to allow Buck to return alone back to Texas instead of being shot as a deserter, the last survivor of the seven who set out for Richmond.

== Cast ==
- James Caan as Buck Burnett
- Michael Sarrazin as Miller Nalls
- Brenda Scott as Gabrielle DuPrey
- Don Stroud as Todo McLean
- Paul Petersen as J.C. Sutton
- Michael Burns as Eubie Bell
- Michael Vincent as Little Bit Lucket
- Harrison Ford as Willie Bill Bearden
- John Doucette as General Braxton Bragg
- Noah Beery as Sgt. Mercer Barnes
- Tisha Sterling as Airybelle Sumner
- James Gammon as Tellis Yeager
- Brian Avery as Carter Claiborne
- Clarke Gordon as Colonel Mirabeau Cooney
- Robert Pine as Collins
- Sean Kennedy as Curtis Claiborne
- Wesley Lau as Colonel Boykin
- Chet Stratton as Mr. Claiborne
- Bing Russell as Greybeard
- Lane Bradford as Case Pettibone
- Rex Ingram as Jacob
- Myron Healey as Sheriff Briggs
- Eileen Wesson as Ella Newsome
- Albert Popwell as Samuel

== Reception ==
=== Critical reception ===
TV Guide gave it a negative review, scoring it 2/5, and finding it too talky despite a small number of good action scenes; they also found attempts to establish parallels to the Vietnam War did not work. Filmink magazine said "the only interesting thing about the film, which stinks of cheap TV and dodgy craft, is that cast and Caan's terrible wig."

== See also ==
- List of American films of 1968
