= The Secret Life of Hernando Cortez =

American short film (1968)

- Directed by: John Chamberlain
- Screenplay by: Edward Leffingwell, John Chamberlain
- Produced by: Alan Power
- Starring: Ultra Violet, Taylor Mead, John Chamberlain
- Cinematography: John Chamberlain, Richard Davis, Carol Williams
- Release date: 1968
- Running time: 58 minutes
- Country: United States
- Language: English

The Secret Life of Hernando Cortez is a 1968 experimental film by John Chamberlain. It starred two of Andy Warhol's Factory actors, Ultra Violet and Taylor Mead.

== History ==
John Chamberlain is primarily known as a sculptor, but starting in 1968 he made two experimental films. The plot of this film is casual, like many counterculture films of the 1960s, and was essentially about "what to do after arriving in Veracruz". The film has been described in writings as "freeform," "sexually explicit," and as "hallucinatory soft porn". Chamberlain described an underlying theme of "conquest". Art critic and curator Edward G. Leffingwell helped write the screenplay, and fashion designer Tiger Morse served as the costume designer. It was filmed in color in the Yucatán and has a 58 minutes runtime.

The Secret Life of Hernando Cortez was screened in February 1967 at Hunter College, alongside Chamberlain's film Wide Point (1968), also starring Taylor Mead. Both films were shown at the 1968 Annual Exhibition, at Whitney Museum of American Art. It was later shown in the context of movie theaters, film festivals and international art exhibitions. The Secret Life of Hernando Cortez has a cult following. The film is part of the Chinati Foundation collection. A flyer for the 1967 film screening at Hunter College is part of the collection at the Smithsonian Institution.

== Cast ==
- John Chamberlain, as Blackie Norton
- Taylor Mead, as Hernando Cortez
- Ultra Violet (also known as Isabelle Collin Dufresne), as 'Daughter of Montezuma'

== See also ==
- Hernán Cortés
