= Red Alert (1977 film) =

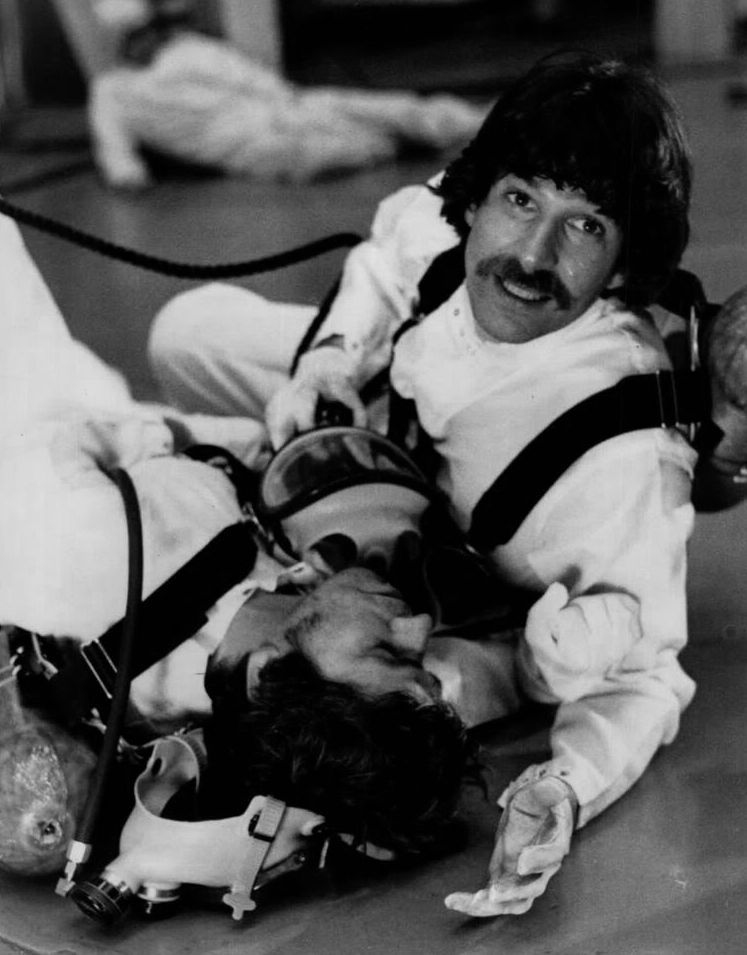
- Devane (bottom) with Michael Brandon (top) in a publicity photo for Red Alert, 1977
- Based on: Paradigm Red by Harold King
- Written by: Sandor Stern
- Directed by: William Hale
- Starring: William Devane; Michael Brandon; Adrienne Barbeau
- Music by: George Tipton
- Country of origin: United States
- Original language: English

Production
- Producer: Barry Goldberg
- Cinematography: Ric Waite
- Editor: John A. Martinelli
- Running time: 95 minutes
- Production companies: The Jozak Company; Paramount Television

Original release
- Network: CBS
- Release: May 18, 1977

Red Alert is a 1977 thriller television film directed by William Hale (as Billy Hale) and starring William Devane, Michael Brandon, Ralph Waite and Adrienne Barbeau. It was originally broadcast on the CBS Television Network.

== Plot ==
When a leak of superheated water inside the containment area of a nuclear power plant erupts, PROTEUS, the computer orders the sealing off the compound, trapping 14 men inside. The plant managers had been warned of erratic readings of the core pressure prior to the emergency, but disregarded them, knowing that they would be changing the fuel rods the next day.

As the core temperature rises, and pressure drops, the reactor's managers realize that they are facing a possibility of a core meltdown, or even an explosion given the presence of combustible gases. Backup systems, meant to contain the situation, fail. Authorities call in “Commander” Stone, who in turn call in an emergency team of investigators led by Frank Brolen (William Devane). Brolen is dependable, mostly because the loss of his wife and son have allowed him to become fully focused on his job.

Brolen and Wyche arrive at the plant, and immediately clash with Commander Stone. Relying on PROTEUS, Stone discounts sabotage as a cause of the accident, believing human error as the more likely cause. In contrast, Brolen considers sabotage a better explanation for both the initial emergency and the failure of the backup systems.

Brolen's suspicions are raised when he learns that the wife of Howard Ives, one of the men trapped in the containment, has just been found dead, an apparent suicide. Visiting Ives's home, Brolen finds materials that could have been used to make a number of home-made bombs. When a sound resembling human breathing is overheard on speakers linked to the containment area, Brolen suspects that someone is still alive inside the reactor. One of the men on Brolen's team finds Ives's lunchbox, and discovers one of Ives's bombs inside. Brolen theorizes that Ives's plans to sabotage the reactor were derailed by a freak accident. A detailed investigation of Ives's use of PROTEUS shows that the plant worker had inquired as to the plant's various systems, essentially using the computer to teach him how circumvent its ability to protect the plant. Coupled with the recent death of Ives's daughter, a radical killed during a botched arrest, Ives's conduct convinces Brolen that they are facing an emergency partially based in sabotage.

Brolen realizes that he has no choice but to enter the reactor. If Ives is alive, they need him to explain where the remaining bombs are. Disobeying Stone's orders, Brolen enters the reactor area and finds that there's no radiation. Among the bodies of other workers, Brolen find that Ives is still alive. Before Brolen can extract information from Ives, he sees that an overhead crane has begun moving. Stone, remembering that the fuel rods were due to be changed, realizes that the crane, under computer control, is following its orders to open the reactor. Because the reactor is still “hot”, opening the reactor now will trigger a nuclear release. Brolen and Wyche struggle with the crane's hook, preventing it from opening the reactor containment vessel.

== Cast ==
- William Devane as Frank Brolen
- Michael Brandon as Carl Wyche
- Adrienne Barbeau as Judy Wyche
- Ralph Waite as Henry Stone
- David Hayward as Larry Cadwell
- M. Emmet Walsh as Sheriff Sweeney
- Don Wiseman as Bill Yancy
- Don Rausch as Dryer
- John Martin as Ajax
- Howard Finch as Harry Holland
- Jim Siedow as Howard Ives
- Dan Ammerman as Rogers
- Charles Krohn as Parker
- Arnie Shayne as Business Man
- Charles J. Bailey as Airline Clerk
- Dixie Taylor as Mrs. Kerwin

== Production ==
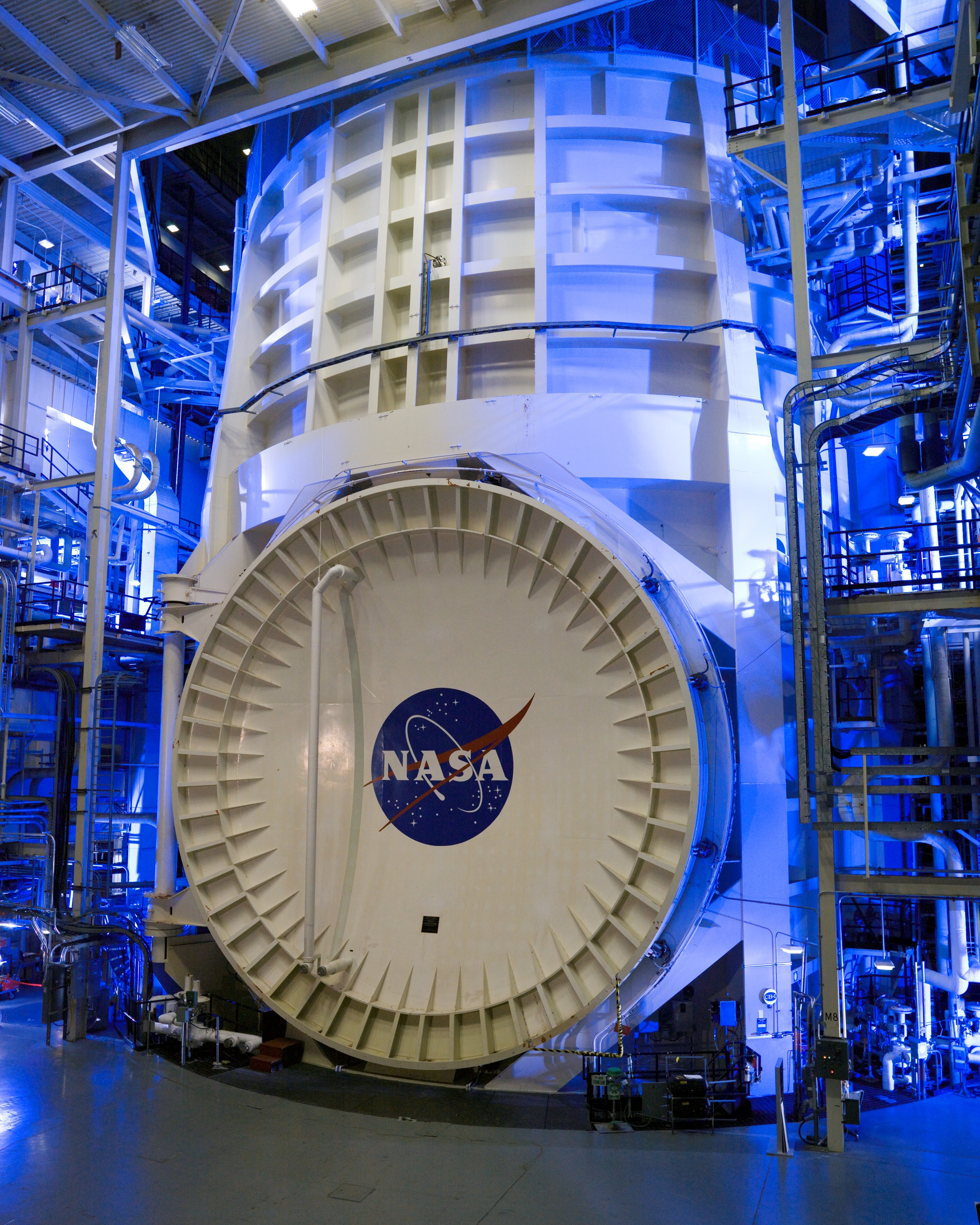
Thermal Vacuum Test chamber was used as the set for the nuclear reactor in Red Alert

The Thermal Vacuum Test known as Chamber A in Building 32 at NASA's Johnson Space Center was used as the interior of the film's Nuclear Station 34.

The chamber was also used in the 1976 film Futureworld, as the site of the simulated rocket launch.

== Broadcast ==
The film aired on CBS, on May 18, 1977.
