= Isabelle Collin Dufresne =

French-American artist and author (1935–2014)

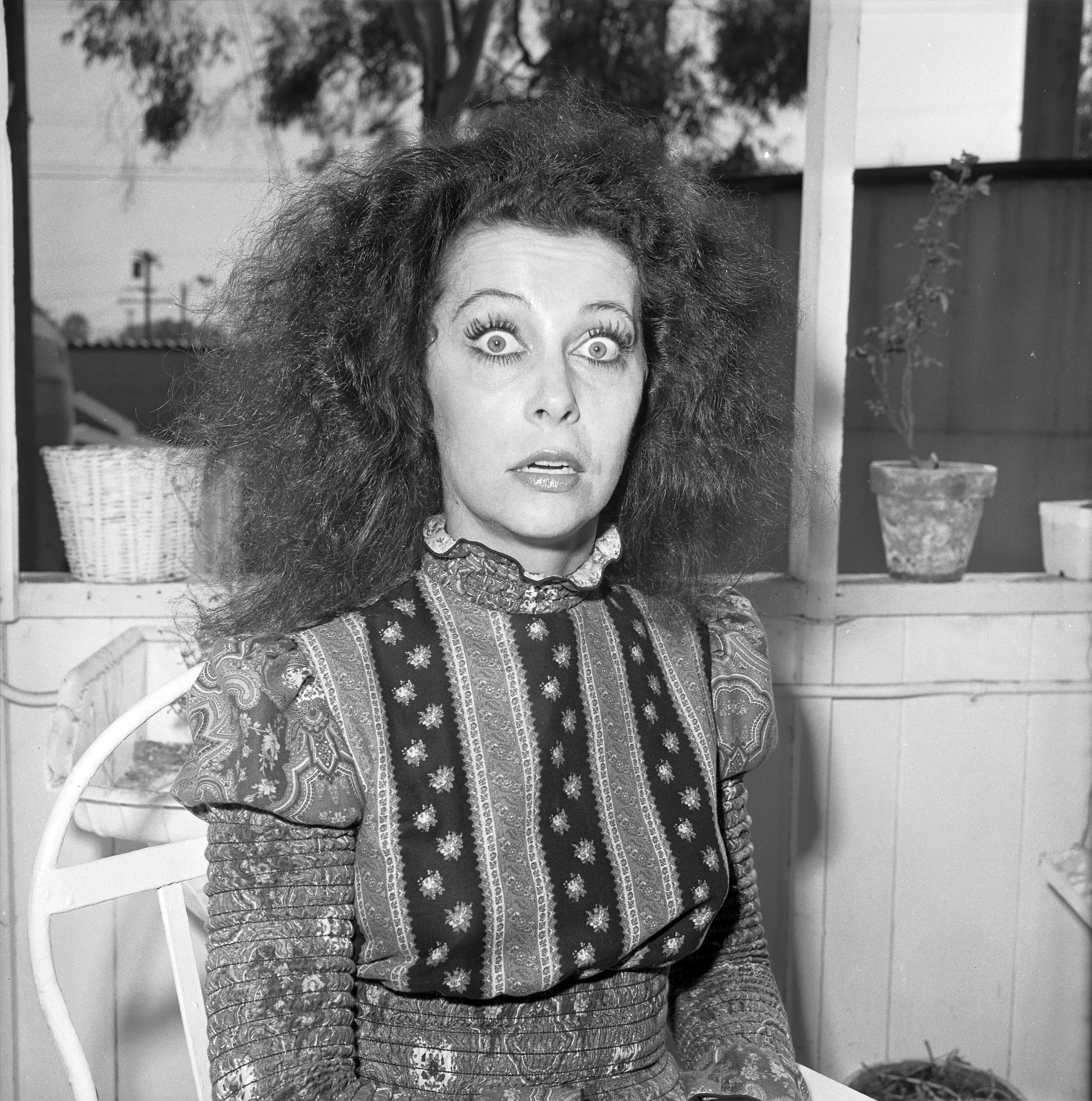
- Ultra Violet in 1970
- Born: Isabelle Collin Dufresne; 6 September 1935; La Tronche, France
- Died: 14 June 2014 (aged 78); New York City, U.S.
- Other name: Ultra Violet
- Occupations: Actress, writer, artist

Isabelle Collin Dufresne (6 September 1935 – 14 June 2014), known professionally as Ultra Violet, was a French-American artist, actress, and writer. She initially studied and worked with Surrealist artist Salvador Dalí before relocating to New York, where she became closely associated with Pop artist Andy Warhol and his Factory scene. As a Warhol superstar she appeared in several of his underground films. Beyond her work in film, she was an active participant in the 1960s and 1970s avant-garde art scene, collaborating with other notable artists and later documenting her experiences in memoirs that chronicled life at Warhol's Factory and her interactions with the era's leading cultural figures.

== Early life and education ==
Isabelle Collin Dufresne was born in La Tronche, France on 6 September 1935. She was brought up in a strict religious upper-middle-class family, but she rebelled at an early age. She attended a Catholic school outside of Grenoble, run by the Sacred Heart. At the age of seven she began boarding at the convent. "The nuns seemed to believe I was possessed by a demon," she said. Dufresne disliked being at the convent so she was offered the option of leaving and traveling to the United States when she was seventeen years old.

== Life and career ==
=== New York social and artistic circles ===
In 1953, Dufresne moved to New York City to live with her sister Catherine, then a student at the Convent of the Sacred Heart. After briefly working at the French Embassy and later for the French cultural counselor, she became immersed in the city's social and cultural life, attending gallery openings, receptions, and society events. Financially supported in part by her sister and a small inheritance, she cultivated a distinctive personal style and quickly gained attention within elite social circles, appearing in publications such as Town & Country and The New York Times.

An avid interest in art, developed during her youth in France, shaped her social and professional trajectory. She frequented galleries and museums, forming connections with leading artists including Barnett Newman, Willem de Kooning, Joan Miró, Marcel Duchamp, Man Ray, and Max Ernst. By the late 1950s, she was traveling between New York and Paris, where she began dealing art, buying and reselling works for profit. During this time, she got involved with the April in Paris Ball, the Botticelli Ball, Parke-Bernet openings, the Museum of Modern Art, the Guggenheim, the Whitney Museum in New York.

In 1959, she met painter John Graham, who became her lover and further deepened her engagement with modern art. In 1960, she was introduced to surrealist painter Salvador Dalí in New York; the two formed a close personal relationship. She moved into his suite at the Regis Hotel and become his "muse", pupil, studio assistant, and lover, traveling with him to Europe. Later, she would recall, "I realized that I was 'surreal', which I never knew until I met Dalí." Dalí helped her get a part in Pablo Picasso's play Desire Caught by the Tail, which was presented in 1967 in St. Tropez, France.

=== Andy Warhol and the Factory ===
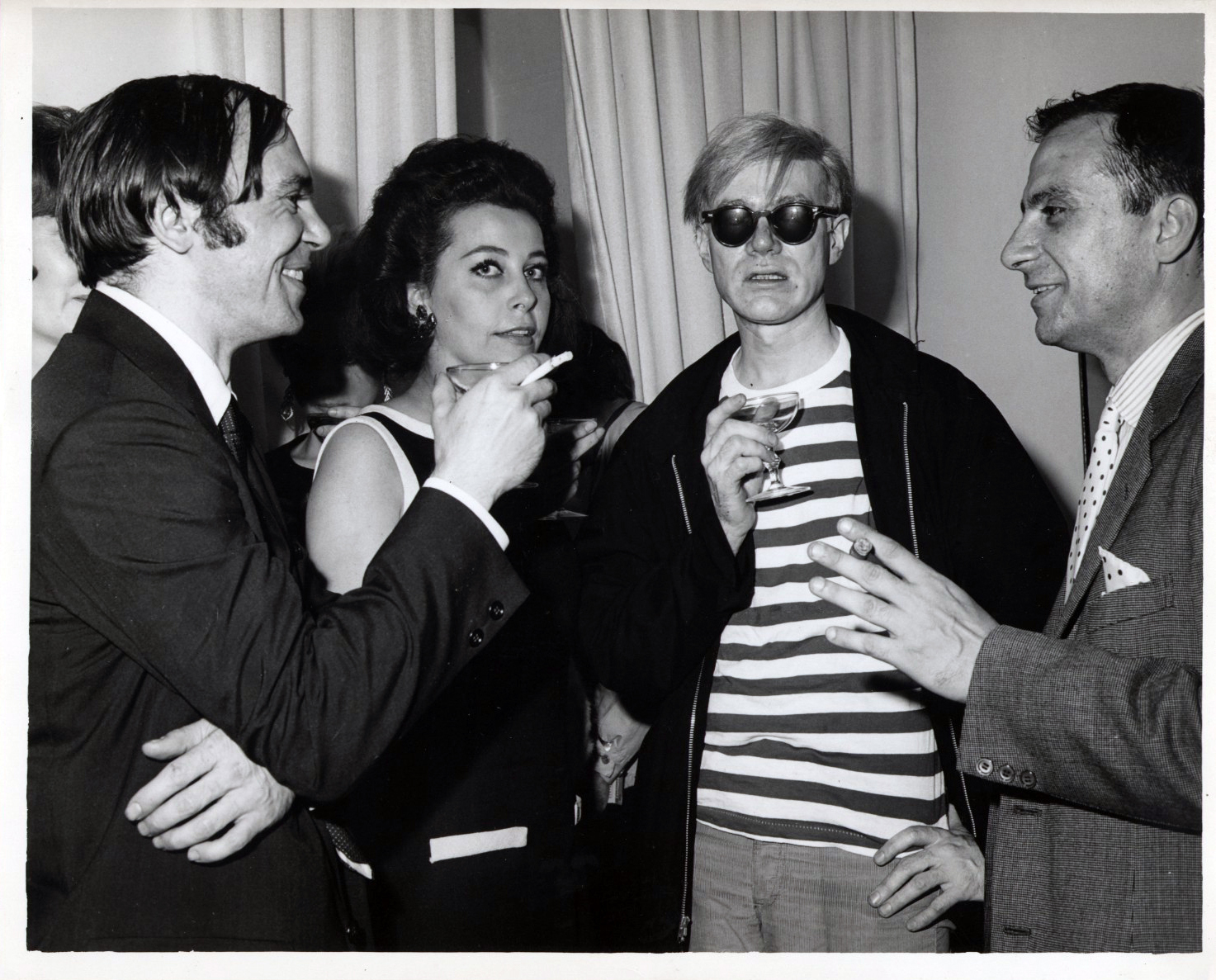
Bob Stanley, Ultra Violet, Andy Warhol, Paul Bianchini at the Bianchini Gallery in New York, 1965.

Through her relationship with Dalí, she met Pop artist Andy Warhol. In his memoir Popism, Warhol recalled the first time he met her:

I'd met her one day in '65 when she walked into the Factory in a pink Chanel suit and bought a big Flowers painting that was still wet for five hundred dollars. Her name was Isabelle Collin-Dufresne then and she hadn't dyed her hair purple yet. She had expensive clothes and a penthouse on Fifth Avenue, and she drove a Lincoln that was the same as the presidential one. She was past a certain age, but she was still beautiful; she looked a lot like Vivien Leigh.

Soon she became one of many Warhol superstars part of the Factory scene and appeared in many of his films. She selected her stage name "Ultra Violet" out of a book. I chose Ultra Violet because it is the most erotic color. It is the color of sexual organs ... Violet is the last color of the rainbow; and ultra violet is beyond that. It is ... I don't know ... closer to God."

In 1967, Ultra Violet attended the Cannes Film Festival with Warhol to screen Chelsea Girls, but the film was not shown because "the festival authorities explained that the film was too long, there were technical problems, there was no time."

Ultra Violet and fellow Warhol superstar Taylor Mead starred in John Chamberlain's The Secret Life of Hernando Cortez (1968), filmed in Mexico. While Warhol was hospitalized after a near-fatal shooting in 1968, Ultra Violet and a few other Factory members filmed a party scene for John Schlesinger's Midnight Cowboy (1969). Later that year, Ultra Violet appeared in Brass Bed, an unreleased film shot in a Manhattan apartment in October 1968. Running approximately 66 minutes, the film features Ultra Violet alongside Candy Darling, Geri Miller, Viva, Ann Wehrer, Vera Cruz, and several other women. According to curator Callie Angell's notes, the participants improvised conversations about relationships, celebrity, and their personal lives. The film remains unfinished and has never been publicly screened.

Ultra Violet was cast in the MGM film The Magic Garden of Stanley Sweetheart (1970), which reportedly was intended to feature Warhol in his commercial film debut alongside his superstars Joe Dallesandro and Gerard Malanga. In the end, however, Candy Darling was the only Factory member to appear, making a brief cameo.

Although a full participant in activities at the Factory, she generally avoided the heavy drug usage prevalent at the time, saying that her body reacted badly to drugs. She had tried smoking as a rebellious teen, had gotten very sick as a result, and resolved to abstain from drug usage. She would later observe, "If I had lived like all those young people, I would be dead today".

In the early 1970s, she drifted away from the Factory scene, taking a lower profile and working independently on her own art.

=== Later career ===
She had bit roles in the films Midnight Cowboy (1969), Maidstone (1970), and The Phynx (1970). She also appeared in the 1971 film Taking Off directed by Miloš Forman. She would eventually appear in more than 20 films, not counting numerous documentaries made at the Factory.

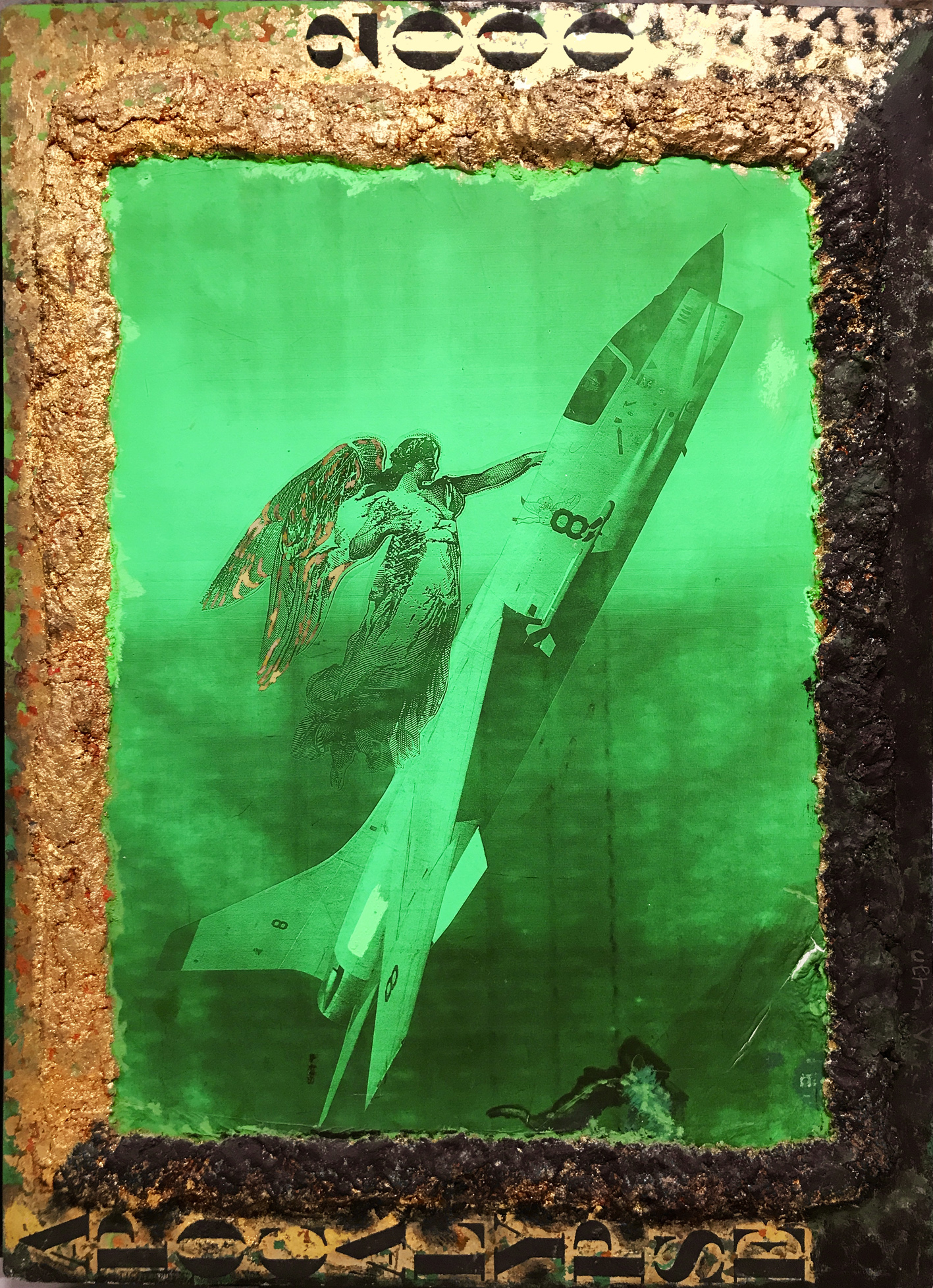
Apocalypse 2000, Ultraviolet (1999)

In 1988, Ultra Violet published her autobiography, Famous for 15 Minutes: My Years with Andy Warhol. This autobiography was edited extensively and partially translated from French to English by her New York penthouse roommate Natalie Durkee. After a review of the book in The New York Times, it was published worldwide, eventually in 17 languages. After a book tour, she returned to France; in 1990 she opened a studio in Nice and wrote another book detailing her own ideas about art, L'Ultratique. She lived and worked as an artist in New York City, and also maintained a studio in Nice for the rest of her life.

In 1994, the New Yorker magazine published a brief article describing a dream she had had on the night Andy Warhol died in 1987. She did not even know that he was in the hospital at that time, and was shocked to hear a report on the radio the next morning. In 2000, she was featured in Message to Andy Warhol, a "concept art documentary" by Laurent Foissac.

On 10 April 2005, she joined a panel discussion "Reminiscences of Dalí: A Conversation with Friends of the Artist" as part of a symposium "The Dalí Renaissance" for a major retrospective show at the Philadelphia Museum of Art. Her conversation with another former Dalí protégée, French singer/actress Amanda Lear, is recorded in the 236-page exhibition catalog, The Dalí Renaissance: New Perspectives on His Life and Art after 1940.

In 2006, she had a solo show at Stefan Stux Gallery in Chelsea, Manhattan. In 2007 she gave a retrospective lecture at the New York Institute of Technology.

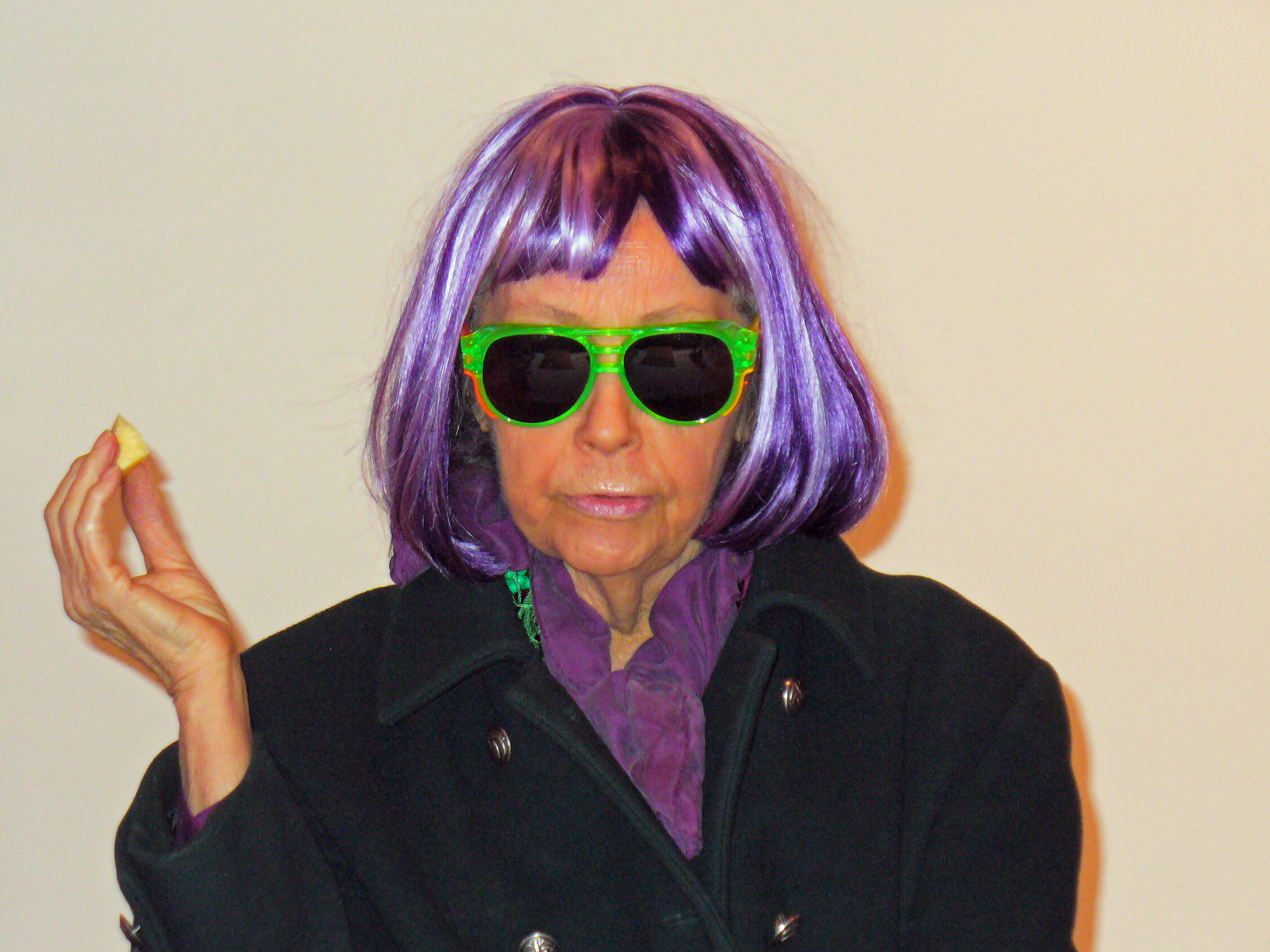
Ultra Violet at a celebration of the Warhol Factory (2007)

In 2011, filmmaker David Henry Gerson released Ultra Violet for Sixteen Minutes, a short documentary showing her perspectives on fame, art, religion, and her current artistic practice. The film was acquired into the permanent collection of the Museum of Modern Art, and was quoted as the final line in her NY Times obituary where they quoted her line in the film: “As you come closer to your true nature, you are more fulfilled.”

In 2011, she was featured in a brief article about the surviving former Warhol "Superstars". Regarding her famous past and her artwork today, she has said, "People always want to know about the past, but I'm much more interested in tomorrow". In 2011, she exhibited a series of artworks as her personal memorial of the September 11 attacks, which were displayed in the exhibit Memorial IX XI at Queensborough Community College.

In a 2012 interview, she said, "I'm a New Yorker, I'm an American, and I'm an artist. Because of those three things, I had to do something about 9/11, and the question was what to do, which is not simple."

She gave her last TV interview for the German documentary about obsessive–compulsive disorder (OCD), Wie ich lernte, die Zahlen zu lieben (How I Learned to Love the Numbers), by Oliver Sechting and Max Taubert.

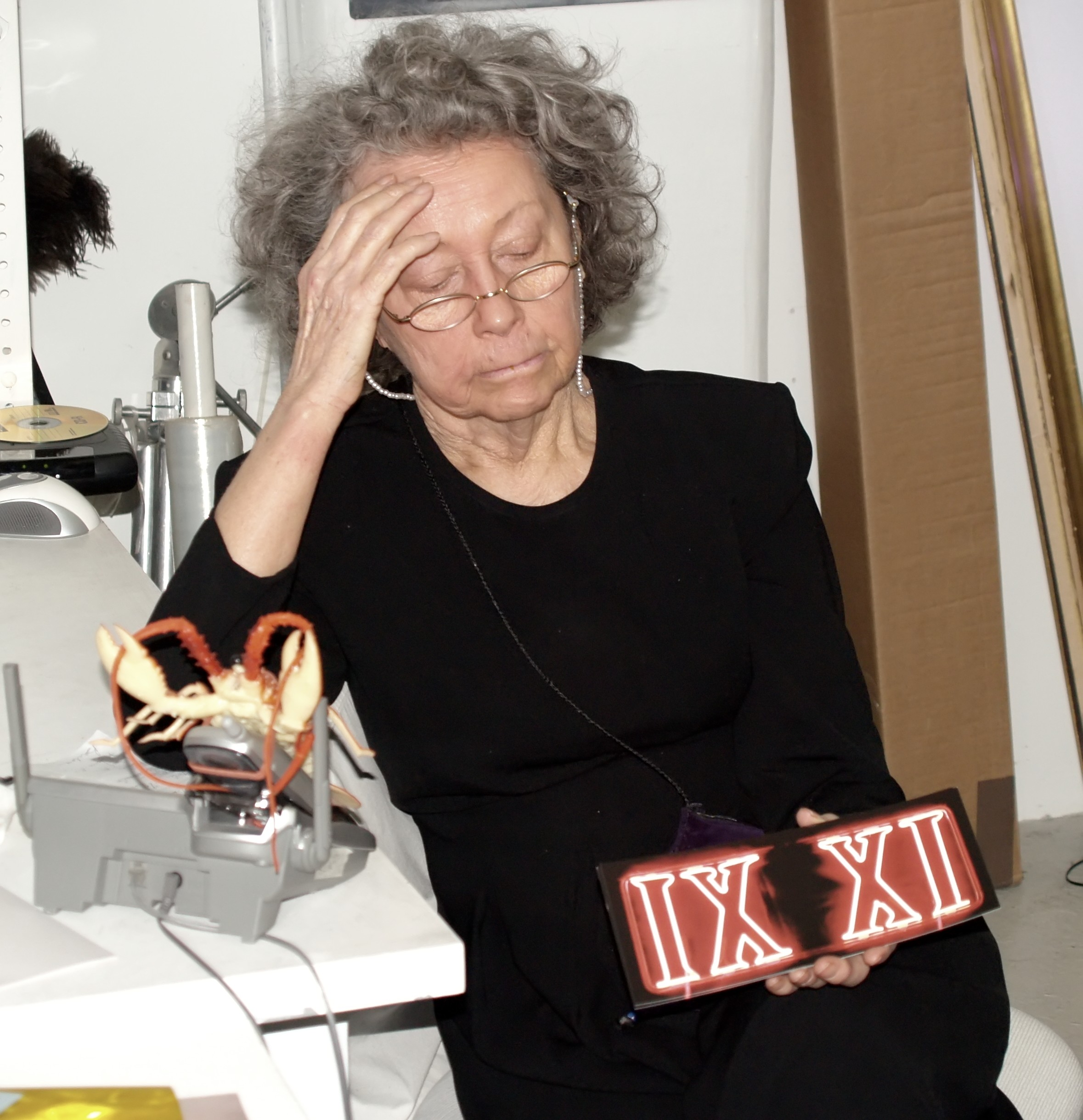
Ultra Violet with her artwork memorializing the 9/11 attacks (2008)

In 2014, she exhibited in four different solo and group shows, in New York and in Nice.

Her last exhibition at the Dillon Gallery in Manhattan, Ultra Violet: The Studio Recreated, closed three weeks before her death. It included paintings, sculptures, photographs, films, and neon art. Three of her sculptures are in the permanent collection of the 9/11 Museum.

On 12 August 2014, independent record label Refinersfire released a posthumous limited edition 2-disc collection of original music and private conversations of Ultra Violet and Andy Warhol. The music was recorded in the late 1960s and early 1970s, and features cover performances of "La vie en Rose", "Mojo Queen", and the original songs "Famous for Fifteen Minutes" and "Moon Rock". Ultra Violet also had recorded private telephone conversations between herself and Andy Warhol, which feature topics such as police harassment, their films, the business of art, the RFK assassination, and Valerie Solanas and her attempt on Warhol's life.

== Death ==
Dufresne died from cancer at the age of 78 in New York City on 14 June 2014. She had never married, was survived by two sisters, and is buried in Saint-Égrève near Grenoble.

== Personal life ==
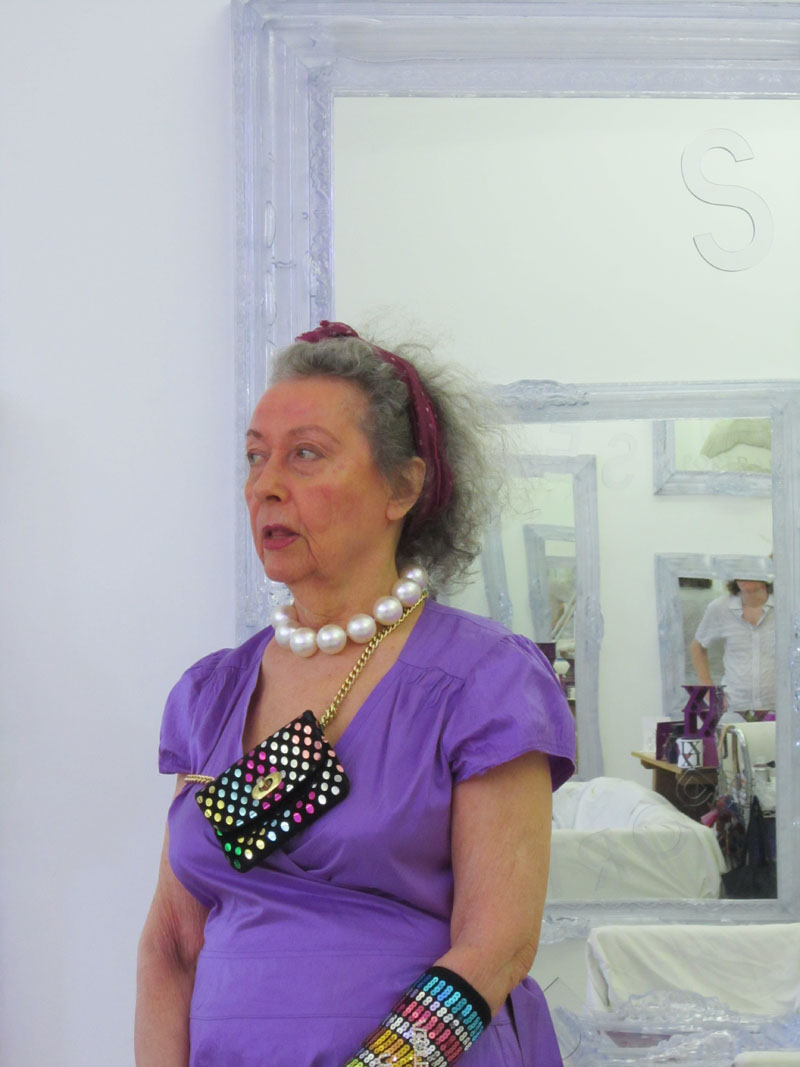
Ultra Violet in her New York City studio (2012)

Her first love was Antonio Pellizzeri, an Italian artist she met while he was passing through New York. In 1959, she met painter John Graham, and the two had a torrid on-and-off affair until he died from leukemia in 1961. In 1960, she met surrealist painter Salvador Dalí and became his lover. "Our lovemaking is Daliesque, theatrical, inventive, but never penetrating in the conventional way. I eventually realize that he has a fear of impregnation verging on the paranoid," she recalled. John Chamberlain, Edward Ruscha, Rudolf Nureyev, and Miloš Forman were also among her lovers.

In the 1960s, she began to follow the progressive American Pop Art scene, including Jasper Johns, Robert Rauschenberg, and James Rosenquist. At various points in her career she would meet numerous celebrities, including Howard Hughes, Richard Nixon, Aristotle Onassis, Maria Callas, Marcel Duchamp, Man Ray, Marc Chagall, Bob Dylan, John Lennon, and Yoko Ono.

In 1973, a near-death experience with an ulcerated colon and a bout with depression launched Ultra Violet on a spiritual quest, culminating in her baptism in 1981. For the rest of her life, she was a practicing member of the Church of Jesus Christ of Latter-day Saints. She also became involved in charity work, saying "I am learning, the hard way, that life is about service".

Ultra Violet moved into a rental duplex apartment at East 88th Street and Fifth Avenue in Carnegie Hill in the 1960s. When the building converted to a co-op in the early 1970s, she purchased several units—later selling most but retaining the tower apartment she lived in for the rest of her life. She recalled paying under $30,000 for it in 1972; by 2010, it was appraised at around $10 million. She also had a studio in Nice, France.

== Books ==
- Ultra Violet (1988). Famous for 15 Minutes: My Years with Andy Warhol. San Diego: Harcourt Brace Jovanovich. ISBN 978-0-15-130201-7.
- Andy Warhol: Superstar (in German). Bergisch Gladbach, Germany: Bastei Lübbe. 1991. ISBN 978-3-404-61205-5.
- L'Ultratique (in French). Lodève, France: Imprimerie des Beaux-Arts. 1991. ISBN 9782908811162.

== Filmography ==
- The Life of Juanita Castro (1965)
- **** (The 24 Hour Movie) (1967)
- I, a Man (1967)
- Midnight Cowboy (1969) .... The Party
- The Secret Life of Hernando Cortez (1969) .... Daughter of Montezuma
- Dinah East (1970) .... Daniela
- Brand X (1970) .... Singer
- The Phynx (1970) .... Felice
- Cleopatra (1970)
- Maidstone (1970) .... Herself
- Believe in Me (1971) .... Emergency Room Patient
- The Telephone Book (1971) .... Whip Woman
- Simon, King of the Witches (1971) .... Sarah
- Taking Off (1971) .... SPFC Member
- Savages (1972) .... Iliona, a Decadent
- Bad Charleston Charlie (1973)
- Curse of the Headless Horseman (1974) .... Contessa Isabel du Fren
- An Unmarried Woman (1978) .... Lady MacBeth
- Cinématon #1084 (1988) by Gérard Courant ... Herself
- Lire #27 (1988) by Gérard Courant ... Herself
- Portrait de groupe #92 : Avec Ultra-Violet à Paris by Gérard Courant ... Herself
- La Collection secrète de Salvador Dalí (1992) by Otto Kelmer ... Herself
- Blackout (1994) .... Arlette
- Message to Andy Warhol (2000) by Laurent Foissac ... Herself
- Wie ich lernte, die Zahlen zu lieben (2014) by Oliver Sechting & Max Taubert ... Herself

== See also ==
- Louise Bourgeois
- Niki de Saint Phalle
