= Brian Avery (actor) =

American film, stage and television actor

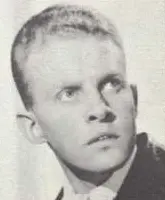
- Avery in 1966
- Born: July 13, 1940 (age 86); Los Angeles, California, U.S.
- Education: Loyola Marymount University
- Occupations: Film, stage and television actor
- Children: Eric Avery

Brian Avery (born July 13, 1940) is an American film, stage and television actor. He is best known for playing Carl Smith in the 1967 film The Graduate.

== Life and career ==
Avery was born in Los Angeles, California. He attended Loyola Marymount University, earning his BA degree. He began his screen career in 1958, appearing in the film Mardi Gras. In 1959, he appeared in the film The Blue Angel. He then began his stage career in 1963, appearing in the stage play Carousel. During his stage career, in 1964, he played Joe Hardy in the stage play Damn Yankees at the Valley Music Theater in Los Angeles, California, and in 1966, he played Ivor Morgan in the stage play A Time for Singing.

Later in his career, Avery made his television debut in the NBC western television series Laramie. He guest-starred in television programs including Gomer Pyle – USMC, Murder, She Wrote, Dragnet, Fantasy Island, Kolchak: The Night Stalker and The Virginian. He played Carl Smith in the 1967 film The Graduate, and appeared in the films Hitler, Journey to Shiloh, Traffic, A Ticklish Affair and The Curse of El Charro.

Avery retired from acting in 2022, last appearing in the Starz political thriller television series Gaslit.
