= William Hale (director) =

Film and television director (1931–2020)

- Born: July 11, 1931; Rome, Georgia, US
- Died: June 10, 2020 (aged 88); Woodland Hills, California, US
- Other name: Billy Hale
- Occupations: Film and television director
- Years active: 1955–1990
- Spouse: Trudy Dean (m. 1980)

William Hale (July 11, 1931 – June 10, 2020) was an American film and television director. He is best known for such films and television series as The Virginian, Journey to Shiloh, SOS Titanic, The Murder of Mary Phagan and The Streets of San Francisco.

== Early years ==
William Hale was born on July 11, 1931, in Rome, Georgia, to Alma and William Hale. He attended local schools and moved to Atlanta after graduation to attend college. During his freshman year, he got a job working the night shift at a local television station. It was during those night shifts that Hale had the opportunity to watch movies being broadcast by the station and resolved to become a film director.

== Hollywood film and television career ==
Hale subsequently moved to Los Angeles, where he graduated from the USC Film School. His senior year student film, The Towers caught the eye of established Hollywood director George Stevens who hired Hale as Second Unit Director on Stevens' feature film The Greatest Story Ever Told. By the mid-1960s, Hale was directing feature films and made-for-TV movies, for Universal Studios. Over the course of his long career, Hale directed some of the best known A-List actors of his time. Among his credits were a Peabody Award and a Primetime Emmy Award for Outstanding Limited Series.

== Retirement ==
After decades in California, in 2004 William and Trudy Hale sold their Topanga, California, ranch for an amount under $2 million, and moved to Nelson County, Virginia, where they bought a dilapidated farm house on three acres. Naming the new home "Porches", the Hales renovated the rural home, accessible by way of a wooden bridge, and lands into a retreat for poets, novelists, and writers of every stripe. They housed as many as five guest artists at a time. Workshops were organized for the writers, where they could work directly with publishers and editors, to improve their manuscripts.

== Death ==
William (Billy) Hale died June 10, 2020, at the age of 88, in Woodland Hills, California.

== Selected filmography ==
- The Towers (1957)
- Grand Central Market (1963)
- Gunfight in Abilene (1967)
- How I Spent My Summer Vacation (1967)
- Journey to Shiloh (1968)
- Red Alert (1977)
- S.O.S. Titanic (1979)
- Murder in Texas (1981) - Made for TV
- The Demon Murder Case (1983) - Made for TV
- The Murder of Mary Phagan (1988)
- Liberace (1988) - Made for TV
