= Brenda Scott =

American film and television actress (born 1943)

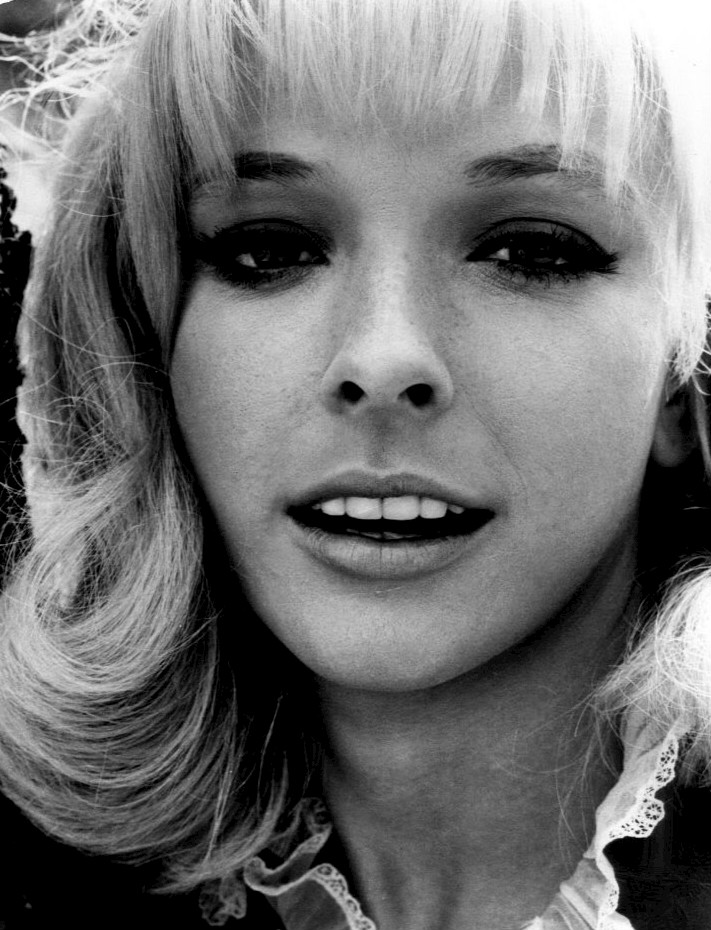
- Scott in 1969
- Born: Brenda J. Smith; March 15, 1943 (age 83); Cincinnati, Ohio, U.S.
- Occupation: Actress
- Years active: 1961-2005
- Spouses: Andrew Prine (m. 1965; div. 1966) (m. 1968; div. 1969) (m. 1973; div. 1978) Dean Hargrove (m. 1979)

Brenda Scott (born March 15, 1943) is an American film and television actress. Her stage name comes from an F. Scott Fitzgerald character.

== Early life ==
Born Brenda Jean Smith on March 15, 1943 in Cincinnati, and raised there and in California's San Fernando Valley, Scott is the daughter of Mr. and Mrs. Dewey E. Smith. At age 5, she began her studies at the Schuester-Martin School of Drama in Cincinnati; she later attended Reseda High School and Valley State College, Northridge.

== Career ==
Scott appeared in films such as The Hanged Man (1964); Johnny Tiger (1966); Journey to Shiloh (1968) and Simon, King of the Witches (1971). Her television credits include Rawhide, Gunsmoke (as crippled woman “Betsey Burgess“ in “Anybody Can Kill A Marshall” - S8E26), Alias Smith and Jones, Hawaii Five O, Mannix, Ironside, Mr. Novak, Bonanza, Leave It to Beaver, Hazel, Window on Main Street, Run for Your Life, Wagon Train, 77 Sunset Strip, Dragnet 1967, The Fugitive, Simon & Simon, Mod Squad, The Virginian, Lancer, Cade's County, Temple Houston and Here Come the Brides. Scott said, "I started out playing neurotic types because they decided I had a waif-like face."

Scott shared that she had wanted to act since she was a child and that during her teen years she believed in palmistry and astrology.

== Personal life ==
Scott was married to fellow actor Andrew Prine, who played her brother in The Savage Land. Scott and Prine started living separately after only being married for four months. Prine and Scott were divorced in 1969. They would marry and divorce three times over the course of their lives.

Since 1979, Scott has been married to Dean Hargrove.
