= Simon, King of the Witches =

1971 film by Bruce Kessler

- Theatrical release poster
- Directed by: Bruce Kessler
- Written by: Robert Phippeny
- Produced by: Joe Solomon
- Starring: Andrew Prine
- Cinematography: David L. Butler
- Edited by: Renn Reynolds
- Music by: Stu Phillips
- Production companies: Fanfare Films Inc. (United States); Astral Films (Canada)
- Distributed by: Fanfare Films Inc.
- Release date: May 12, 1971
- Running time: 99 minutes
- Country: United States
- Language: English

Simon, King of the Witches is a 1971 American exploitation horror film directed by Bruce Kessler and starring Andrew Prine, Brenda Scott, George Paulsin, Norman Burton and others. The film centers on the title character as he attempts to become a god through magic rituals.

== Plot ==
Simon Sinestrari, a cynical ceremonial magician, is on a quest to become a god. Simon is living in a storm sewer, selling his charms and potions for money, when he is befriended by a young male prostitute named Turk. Turk introduces Simon to his world of drugs, wild parties, and bizarre Satanic rituals featuring Sarah and a goat. Death, freak-outs and mayhem ensue, along with romance for Simon with the district attorney's daughter Linda. Simon seduces Linda. Together, the two lovers search for the proper spell to make themselves into gods.

== Cast ==
- Andrew Prine as Simon Sinestrari
- George Paulsin as Turk
- Brenda Scott as Linda
- Gerald York as Hercules Van Sint
- Norman Burton as Rackum
- William Martel as Commissioner Davies
- Ray Galvin as Chief Boyle
- Art Hern as Mayor
- Ultra Violet as Sarah
- Harry Rose as Landlord

== Production ==
The film had its world premiere at the McVickers Theatre in Chicago, Illinois, on May 12, 1971.

== Home media ==
Simon, King of the Witches was released on special edition DVD by Dark Sky Films in 2008. It was reissued on Blu-Ray DVD in 2017 by Code Red DVD.

== Reception ==
Charles Tatum from eFilmCritic.com awarded the film one out of five stars, writing, “This film tries to be serious, almost like an exposé, but it fails miserably. It is often funny, without meaning to be. Simon, King of the Witches is all smoke and mirrors. I do not recommend it.” TV Guide gave the film 1/5 stars, criticizing the film's confusing plot.

Ian Jane from DVD Talk wrote, “Simon King of the Witches is a wild mix of seventies psychedelics and occult quirk that makes for a truly quirky watch. Andrew Prine is great in the lead and the film might work better as a cultural artifact than an actual horror picture but regardless, it remains an interesting and well-made movie” Jason Coffman from Film Monthly.com gave the film a positive review, writing, “Simon, King of the Witches is an entertaining film and an interesting time capsule of very early 1970s culture... It might not be a lost genre-defining masterpiece, but it is a gem that deserves to be seen.” Debi Moore from Dread Central rated the film a score of 3.5 out of 5, commending Prine's performance, psychedelic tone, innovative effects.

== See also ==
- List of American films of 1971
- List of films about witchcraft

== Sources ==
- Gods In Polyester: A Survivors' Account Of 70's Cinema Obscura ISBN 90-808700-1-3 features a chapter by Bruce Kessler on the making of Simon.
