= Kupcinet =

Kupcinet is a surname. Notable people with the surname include:

- Irv Kupcinet (1912–2003), American newspaper columnist; father of Karyn Kupcinet
- Jerry Kupcinet (1944–2019), American television producer and director
- Karyn Kupcinet (1941–1963), American actress; daughter of Irv Kupcinet
