= Going My Way (TV series) =

American TV comedy-drama series (1962–1963)

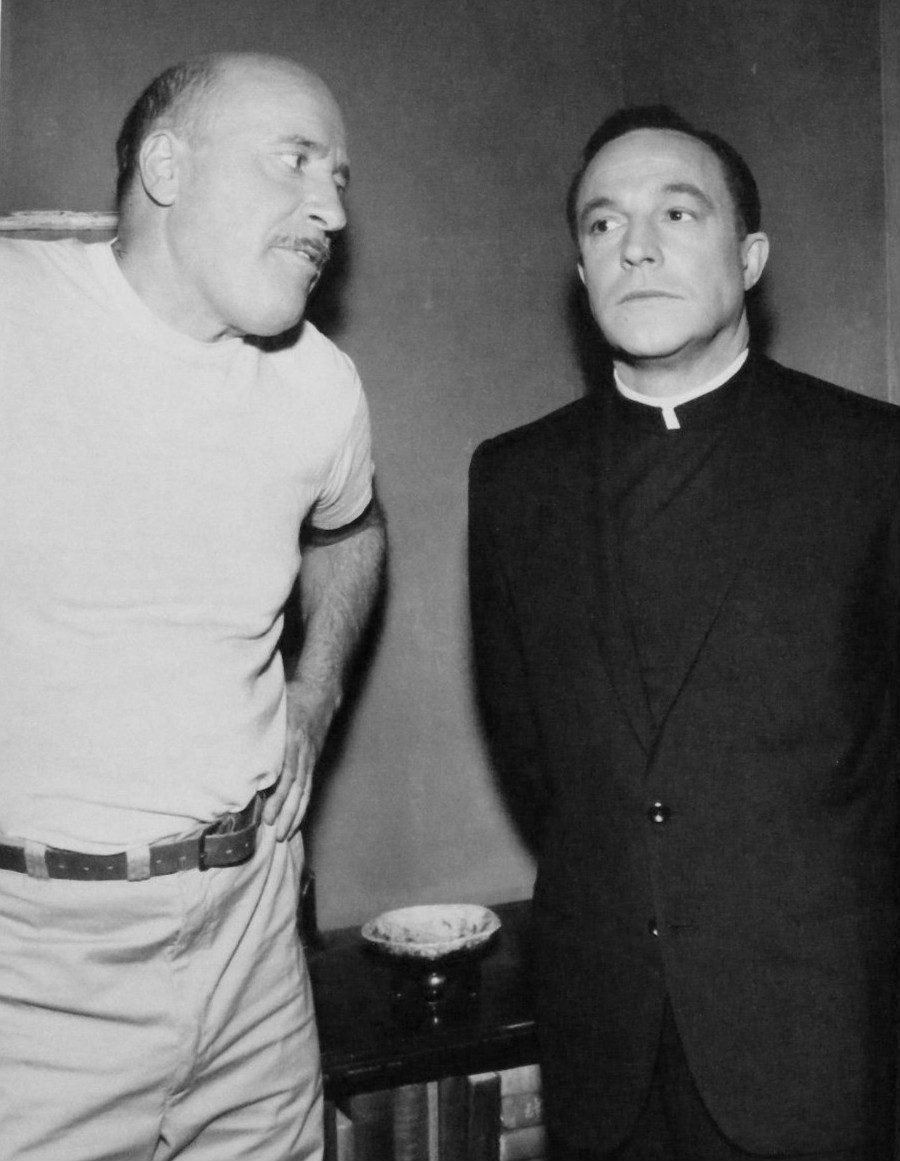
- Fred Clark and Gene Kelly in the November 21, 1962 episode "A Matter of Principle"
- Genre: Comedy drama
- Written by: Richard Baer; Mark Weingart; Joe Connelly; Emmet Lavery
- Directed by: Joseph Pevney; Robert Florey; Alan Crosland, Jr. Paul Stewart
- Starring: Gene Kelly; Dick York; Leo G. Carroll; Nydia Westman
- Theme music composer: Jack Marshall; Cyril Mockridge
- Country of origin: United States
- Original language: English
- No. of seasons: 1
- No. of episodes: 30

Production
- Producer: Joe Connelly
- Running time: 60 minutes
- Production companies: Kerry Productions; Revue Studios; The My Way Company

Original release
- Network: ABC
- Release: October 3, 1962 – April 24, 1963

Related
- Going My Way

Going My Way is an American black-and-white comedy-drama series starring the dancer and actor Gene Kelly. Based on the Academy Award winning 1944 film of the same name starring Bing Crosby, the series aired on ABC with new episodes from October 3, 1962 to April 24, 1963 and summer repeats until September 11, 1963.

Kelly's only acting venture in a weekly dramatic television series, Going My Way was canceled after one season of 30 episodes. The program was also broadcast in England, where the trade publication Sponsor reported that it was "a smash in the London market", rated in the top 10 programs there in 1963.

== Premise ==
Kelly stars as Father Chuck O'Malley, a Roman Catholic priest who is sent to St. Dominic's Parish located in a lower-class section of Manhattan. Dick York, later of Bewitched, portrays a character not in the film, Chuck's boyhood friend Tom Colwell, the director of a secular neighborhood youth center. Also co-starring is Leo G. Carroll as the aging pastor, Father Fitzgibbon, portrayed in the film, by Barry Fitzgerald. Nydia Westman is Mrs. Featherstone, the housekeeper of the rectory, portrayed by Eily Malyon in the film, where the character is named Mrs. Carmody. Episodes focus on Father O'Malley's attempts to connect with the congregation and his relationship with the elderly Father Fitzgibbon.

== Guest stars ==
- John Alderson
- Raymond Bailey
- Patricia Barry
- Don Beddoe
- Ed Begley
- Whit Bissell
- Eddie Bracken
- Steve Brodie
- Richard Carlson
- Paul Carr
- Nancy Carroll
- Linden Chiles
- Virginia Christine
- Fred Clark
- Russell Collins
- Richard Conte
- Gladys Cooper
- Ellen Corby
- Noreen Corcoran
- Jerome Cowan
- Joel Crothers
- William Demarest
- Richard Denning
- Ivan Dixon
- Lawrence Dobkin
- Keir Dullea
- James Dunn
- Dan Duryea
- James Edwards
- Anthony Eisley
- Robert Emhardt
- Betty Field
- Mary Field
- Dianne Foster
- Preston Foster
- Anne Francis
- Beverly Garland
- Lisa Gaye
- Connie Gilchrist
- Susan Gordon
- Dorothy Green
- Virginia Gregg
- Bill Halop
- Florence Halop
- Charles Herbert
- Marianna Hill
- Dennis Joel
- Arch Johnson
- George Kennedy
- Susan Kohner
- Will Kuluva
- Karyn Kupcinet
- Rod Lauren
- Cloris Leachman
- David Lewis
- Joanne Linville
- Richard Long
- Phyllis Love
- Nora Marlowe
- Mike Mazurki
- Kevin McCarthy
- Frank McHugh
- Ellen McRae
- Ralph Meeker
- Roger Mobley
- Joanna Moore
- Juanita Moore
- Harry Morgan
- Pat Morrow
- Arnold Moss
- Billy Mumy
- Barbara Nichols
- Jeanette Nolan
- Cliff Norton
- Erin O'Brien - Moore
- Pat O'Brien
- Gerald O'Loughlin
- J. Pat O'Malley
- Willard Parker
- Victor Perrin
- George Petrie
- Michael Pollard
- Liam Redmond
- Charles Robinson
- Dennis Rush
- Mickey Shaughnessy
- Kent Smith
- Fay Spain
- K. T. Stevens
- Harold J. Stone
- Robert Strauss
- Regis Toomey
- Lee Tracy
- Virginia Vincent
- Ray Walston
- Jack Warden
- James Westerfield
- James Whitmore
- Jane Wyatt

== Episodes ==
No.	Title	Directed by	Written by	Original release date
1	"Back to Ballymora"	Joseph Pevney	Story by : Juanita Vaughn; Teleplay by : Emmet Lavery	October 3, 1962
As a good deed in his sinful life, the pawnbroker Mr. Remplevich brings a check to finance Father Fitzgibbon's trip to his boyhood village in Ireland.: Co-Starring Will Kuluva as Mr. Remplevich Russell Collins as Barney O'Dowd Robert Emhardt as Joe Feeney; CAST Nydia Westman as Mrs. Featherstone Argentina Brunetti as Mrs. Severino Lauren Gilbert as Dr. Warnake Jeff Pevney as The Boy
2	"The Crooked Angel"	Joseph Pevney	William Fay	October 10, 1962
St. Dominic's High School student Eddie Slade has a professional-level singing voice and a potentially bright future, but resorts to theft due to the bad influence of his bar-owner father Jack.: Co-Starring Ralph Meeker as Jack Slade; CAST Dennis Joel as Eddie Slade J. Pat O'Malley as Healy Edward Holmes as Nolan Ralph Manza as Charlie Celia Lovsky as Mother Gabriel; Herbie Faye as The Customer Wally Young as Felix Slade Frank Sully as The Golf Attendant and Phyllis Love as Sister Mary Mathew; and Willard Parker as Monsignor Joseph Francis Giblin uncredited: Nydia Westman [Mrs. Featherstone]; The end credits appear over the parish garden, with doves flying and settling, but Father Fitzgibbon and Father O'Malley are not there.
3	"The Parish Car"	Joseph Pevney	Story by : Joe Connelly; Teleplay by : Mark Weingart and Joe Connelly	October 17, 1962
In the midst of concern about rectory finances, Father Fitzgibbon unknowingly buys a stolen car from local youth Bruce.: CAST Nydia Westman as Mrs. Featherstone Jerome Cowan as Tim Murphy Virginia Christine as Mrs. Randall Barry Kelley as Capt. Donovan Gary Vinson as Bruce Ken Lynch as Lt. Harris Raymond Bailey as Rudy Blanchard; Hugh Sanders as Murray Cranston Peter Leeds as The Policeman Harry Lauter as Frank Johnny Eimen as Tim Wheelen Eddie Hanley as The Clerk Cy Malis as The Worker Marian Morley as The Secretary
4	"The Father"	Alex March	Story by : Caryll Houselander; Teleplay by : Mark Weingart and Joe Connelly	October 24, 1962
St. Dominic's High School student Carmel runs away from her strict father Mr. Fernandez and his even stricter sister Aunt Teresa.: Co-Starring Arnold Moss as Mr. Fernandez; CAST Nydia Westman as Mrs. Featherstone Miriam Goldina as Aunt Teresa Doug Lambert as Randy Simpson Mary Field as Sister Agnes; Harry Ellerbe as The Man Paul Langton as The Businessman Kitty Kelly as The Middle - Aged Woman and Cliff Norton as The Taxi Driver; with Angela Dorian as Carmel uncredited: Shep Houghton [bus depot clerk]
5	"A Man for Mary"	Joseph Pevney	Story by : John Fante; Teleplay by : George Tibbles	October 31, 1962
Beautiful aspiring actress Mary Dunne has boarding house residents such as Mike Lewis and Curt Meyers fighting over her, but widower Joe Bianchi, whose three children have developed a relationship with her, does not realize how attractive she is.: Guest Star Anne Francis as Mary Dunne; Co-Starring George Kennedy as Mike Lewis Robert Strauss as Curt Meyers; CAST Nydia Westman as Mrs. Featherstone Connie Gilchrist as Mrs. Riordan Chet Stratton as Orville Kelton John Harmon as Bruno Martin Raymond Cavaleri as Julius Andrea Darvi as Angela Judy Strangis as Maria James Secrest as Stan Walker; and Gerald O'Loughlin as Joe Bianchi
6	"Like My Own Brother"	Robert Florey	Richard Baer	November 7, 1962
Danny Everett, who was frequently in trouble as a youth, had become a wealthy entrepreneur and has returned to show his strict older brother Al and Al's son Jerry that Al was wrong about Danny's lack of future prospects.: Co-Starring Harry Morgan as Al Everett Paul Carr as Jerry Everett; with Nydia Westman as Mrs. Featherstone Paula Winslowe as Anne Melinda Plowman as Jane Sam Weston as Jack Marcus Bob Hopkins as The Policeman George Spicer as The 1st Boy Johnny Scoggins as The 2nd Boy Dan Krohn as The 3rd Boy Warren White as The 4th Boy; with Eddie Bracken as Danny Everett; The prologue appears after the opening credits.
7	"Not Good Enough for Mary"	Bernard Girard	Richard Baer	November 14, 1962
Snobbish Jimmy Cipollaro disapproves of his sister Mary's engagement to construction worker Carl Wiczinski.: Guest Star Jack Warden as Carl Wiczinski; Co-Starring Virginia Vincent as Mary Cipollaro Al Ruscio as Jimmy Cipollaro; CAST Nydia Westman as Mrs. Featherstone Angela Clarke as Mama Cipollaro Anne Barton as Lois Cipollaro Mike Ragan as The Driver
8	"A Matter of Principle"	Fielder Cook	Richard Baer	November 21, 1962
St. Dominic's High School basketball star Frank Murphy is egotistical and insubordinate due to the bad influence of his grudge-bearing father John.: Co-Starring Fred Clark as John Murphy; Cast Peter Helm as Frank Murphy Nydia Westman as Mrs. Featherstone Chris Warfield as Doctor Thornton Simon Scott as Larry Raymond George Furth as Lester Kip King as Joey; Jerry Ziesmer as Fred Charla Doherty as Harriet Hall Jesse Kirkpatrick as Heath Brad Morrow as Robert Stern Scott Wells as Milton Blumenthal and Virginia Gregg as Margaret Murphy; The end credits appear over a view of the church's Christmas-decorated interior staircase, rather than over the standard filmed parish garden scene.
9	"Mr. Second Chance"	Allen Reisner	Story by : Robert Hardy Andrews; Teleplay by : Mark Weingart and Joe Connelly	November 28, 1962
Former gangster Harold Harrison thinks that he can use his ill-gotten wealth to ingratiate himself with his estranged wife and his soon-to-be-married daughter Marilyn.: Co-Starring Dan Duryea as Harold Harrison; CAST Nydia Westman as Mrs. Featherstone Dorothy Green as Mrs. Harrison Maggie Pierce as Marilyn Harrison Willis Bouchey as Bill Fleming Ross Elliott as Ken Hamlin Steve Terrell as Tony Frankie Darro as The Elevator Operator uncredited: Bess Flowers, Ted Mapes [wedding guests]
10	"Ask Me No Questions"	Robert Florey	Mark Weingart and Joe Connelly	December 5, 1962
Adolescent Michael Corbin has been stealing from the rectory's poor box in an attempt to bring his father Ray back from California to reunite with Michael's mother Nora.: and Nydia Westman as Mrs. Featherstone; Co-Starring Kevin McCarthy as Ray Corbin; Joanne Linville as Nora Corbin; with Roger Mobley as Michael Corbin Mary Field as Sister Agnes Nestor Paiva as Mr. Osborne Allan Ray as The Man Ralph Montgomery as The Postman Jimmy Joyce as The Cab Driver
11	"Keep an Eye on Santa Claus"	Joseph Pevney	Richard Baer	December 12, 1962
Sixtyish convict Honus Shamroy is released to his daughter Karen Murdock, her husband Fred and their little boy Mark. Father Fitzgibbon arranges for Honus to work as Santa in a department store, but Honus and fellow senior citizen William Jennings DePew plan to rob the store.: Co-Starring James Dunn as Honus Shamroy; Frank McHugh as William Jennings DePew; Cloris Leachman as Karen Murdock Steve Brodie as Fred Murdock; CAST Nydia Westman as Mrs. Featherstone Mary Field as Sister Agnes Ken Lynch as Lt. Harris Henry Hunter as The Floorwalker Eddie Hanley as The Man Katie Sweet as The Little Girl and Billy Mumy as Mark Murdock uncredited: Joe Ploski [department store customer], Arthur Tovey [guest at celebration]
12	"A Dog for Father Fitz"	Herman Hoffman	Emmet Lavery and Joe Connelly	December 19, 1962
Having been gifted a large and overly active Irish setter, Father Fitzgibbon re-gifts the setter to little parishioner Terry, but the dog runs back to the rectory and is hit by a truck.: CAST Nydia Westman as Mrs. Featherstone Dennis Rush as Terry Forrest Lewis as Mr. Carter Blossom Rock as Mrs. Carter George Wallace as Truck Driver; Norman Leavitt as Milkman Kenneth MacDonald as Captain Robert B. Williams as Policeman William Giorgio as Taxi Driver Dick Crockett as Mailman and Phyllis Love as Sister Mary; The end credits appear over the parish garden, with doves flying and settling, but Father Fitzgibbon and Father O'Malley are not there.
13	"A Saint for Mama"	Joseph Pevney	Emmet Lavery	December 26, 1962
When mob boss Tony Laurentino's mother becomes ill and tells him that her will to live will last only if he gives up his life of crime, Tony turns to Father O'Malley for help.: Nydia Westman as Mrs. Featherstone; Also Starring Richard Conte as Tony Laurentino; Beverly Garland as Marsha; CAST Renata Vanni as Mama Laurentino Bert Remsen as The 1st Salesman Gary Walberg as The 2nd Salesman Bart Burns as The Young Detective; Lisa Gaye as Rosa Pavone
14	"Tell Me When You Get to Heaven"	Felix Feist	Lewis Reed	January 2, 1963
Neighborhood physician Dr. Corden, a bitter agnostic, has to convince the religious father of teenager Danny Larkin that the boy needs surgery to save his eyesight.: and Nydia Westman as Mrs. Featherstone; Co-Starring James Whitmore as Dr. Corden; Michael Pollard as Danny Larkin; CAST Mary Field as Sister Agnes Adrienne Marden as Mrs. Larkin Jerry Ziesmer as The 1st Boy Kip King as The 2nd Boy Theodore Newton as The Man Henry Rowland as The Workman and John Alderson as Mr. Larkin
15	"My Son the Social Worker"	Joseph Pevney	Richard Baer	January 9, 1963
Tom Colwell's father Owen, whose dominant and overly gregarious personality has always been burdensome to his son, visits New York to see him.: and Nydia Westman as Mrs. Featherstone; Co-Starring Ed Begley as Owen Colwell; with Bennye Gatteys as Janis Lenihan Chris Warfield as Dr. Thornton Frank Albertson as Commissioner Hughes Herb Ellis as Rabbi Adler Buck Taylor as Mickey Vecchione; Ellen Corby as Mrs. Brophy Jeff Pevney as Ronnie Warren Pat Morrow as Jo Ann Stevens Francie Karath as Myra Friedman Viola Harris as Mrs. Adler George Spicer as George King
16	"A Memorial for Finnegan"	Alan Crosland, Jr.	Malcolm Stuart Boylan	January 16, 1963
Stained glass artist O'Brien carries a bitter memory of long-ago $1800 payment owed to him by devious business executive Francis X. Finnegan who also promised but never gave $5000 to St. Dominic's.: Co-Starring Liam Redmond as The O'Brien; CAST Nydia Westman as Mrs. Featherstone Chris Warfield as Mr. Thornton Nora Marlowe as Mrs. O'Brien; Alice Backes as The Grand Dame True Ellison as The Elevator Operator Harry Swoger as The Truck Driver Victor Perrin as Clarkson Marrisa Mathes as The Girl; Special Guest Preston Foster as Francis X. Finnegan
17	"Don't Forget to Say Goodbye"	Joseph Pevney	Emmet Lavery and Mark Weingart	January 23, 1963
The unhappy marriage of architect Larry McMullen, who is having an affair with his secretary Gerry Donnelly, causes his wife Kitty to consider canceling the marriage plans of her daughter Sally and Sally's fiancé Jeff.: and Nydia Westman as Mrs. Featherstone; Co-Starring Jane Wyatt as Kitty McMullen; Richard Denning as Larry McMullen; Joanna Moore as Gerry Donnelly Noreen Corcoran as Sally McMullen Charles Robinson as Jeff; with Donald Kerr as The Elevator Operator Matty Jordan as The Waiter
18	"The Shoemaker's Child"	Robert Florey	Bob Mosher	January 30, 1963
Artie, the glib-tongued teenage son of respected pediatrician Dr. Norman Weston, feels the need to fit in with other teenagers who engage in petty crime.: and Nydia Westman as Mrs. Featherstone; CAST Arnold Merritt as Artie Weston Harry Bartell as Ed Martin Edward Mallory as Dan Ray Walker as Willis Jerry Ziesmer as Mitch Dale Ishimoto as Father Yamamoto Ken Lynch as Lt. Harris; David Winters as Charlie Dorothy Abbott as The Nurse Rory Stevens as The Boy Bob Biheller as Harry and David Lewis as Dr. Norman Weston
19	"The Slasher"	Joseph Pevney	Story by : Eric Peters; Teleplay by : Lewis Reed	February 6, 1963
A 48-year-old wrestler whose ring name is "The Slasher" has a heart ailment and his wife Helen is insisting that he retire, but he is resisting and is not helped by his manager Marty who is Helen's father.: and Nydia Westman as Mrs. Featherstone; Co-Starring Mickey Shaughnessy as The Slasher William Demarest as Marty Fay Spain as Helen Bancroft; CAST Charles Herbert as Kenny Jerome Cowan as Mr. Murphy Mike Mazurki as The Masked Marvel Jeff Pevney as The 1st Boy Riki Marcelli as The 2nd Boy Justin Smith as The Doctor uncredited: Mushy Callahan [wrestling match referee], Kid Chissell [spectator at wrestling match]
20	"One Small, Unhappy Family"	James Sheldon	Richard Baer	February 13, 1963
Overbearing Dennis Brady, Sr. is dismayed that his son Dennis Jr. and Dennis' wife Elaine have difficulty conceiving a child and are considering adoption.: and Nydia Westman as Mrs. Featherstone; Co-Starring Susan Kohner as Elaine Brady Keir Dullea as Dennis Brady, Jr.; CAST Arthur Peterson, Jr. as Dr. Roger Webb Jimmy Murphy as Earl Henderson Don Keefer as Ralph Ewbank Martin West as Bob Harris John Gentry as The Orderly; Renee Godfrey as The Maid Paul Smith as Mr. Miller Pat Rosson as Kevin Ewbank Lou Byrne as The Nurse and Arch Johnson as Dennis Brady, Sr.
21	"Has Anybody Here Seen Eddie?"	Joseph Pevney	Richard Baer	February 20, 1963
Eddie Karnes, one of the regulars at Tom Colwell's youth center stole an expensive watch and went to live with much older bar girl Marie.: and Nydia Westman as Mrs. Featherstone; Guest Star Barbara Nichols as Marie; with Claire Carleton as Mrs. Karnes Dave Barry as Harry, The Barber Herbie Faye as Bill, The Barber Al Checco as The Bartender; Bernadette Withers as Frances Karnes Karyn Kupcinet as Amy Feldman and Rod Lauren as Eddie Karnes
22	"Blessed Are the Meek"	Robert Florey	William Fay	February 27, 1963
Francis X. Delaney, the jack-of-all-trades new sexton at St. Dominic's, was once a promising seminarian alongside future celebrity Bishop George Cagle.: Nydia Westman as Mrs. Featherstone; Co-Starring Richard Carlson as Francis X. Delaney Kent Smith as Bishop George Cagle; CAST Mary Field as Sister Agnes Connie Gilchrist as Mrs. Reardon Tom Daly as The Character Edward Holmes as Nolan Michael Flatley as Virgil William Sharon as The Rector
23	"Cornelius, Come Home"	Joseph Pevney	James O'Hanlon	March 6, 1963
Cornelius McBride, an elderly lifelong gambler who has been promising for years to marry his landlady Nora Callahan as soon as he hits the big time, wins the Irish Sweepstakes.: and Nydia Westman as Mrs. Featherstone; Guest Star Lee Tracy as Cornelius McBride; Co-Starring Nancy Carroll as Nora Callahan; with Mary Field as Sister Agnes Vito Scotti as Mr. Moletti Argentina Brunetti as Mrs. Moletti Ed Peck as The Reporter Bill Quinn as The Editor Lee Goodman as Tim Powers Henry Hunter as Mr. Simpson; David Fresco as Mr. Kravitz Sue Winton as The Travel Agent Clegg Hoyt as The 1st Piano Mover Clancy Cooper as Clancy, The Bartender Bob Jellison as The Salesman and Florence Halop as Mrs. Kravitz
24	"The Boss of the Ward"	Paul Stewart	Carey Wilber	March 13, 1963
After 35 years as the local ward heeler and solver of everybody's problems, Frank McCaffey finds his purpose in life gone when political boss Tony Alonzi replaces him with cold-hearted local funeral director Tommy Noonan.: and Nydia Westman as Mrs. Featherstone; Guest Star Pat O'Brien as Frank McCaffey; Co-Starring Lawrence Dobkin as Tony Alonzi Erin O'Brien - Moore as Annie McCaffey J. Pat O'Malley as Bathhouse O'Connor; with Marianna Hill as Nora Fallon Joel Crothers as Joe Strozzi Bryan O'Byrne as Tommy Noonan Barry Macollum as Tim Shea Grace Albertson as Cecelia Fallon George Petrie as Ed Fallon Athena Lorde as Maria Strozzi
25	"Run, Robin, Run"	Joseph Pevney	Story by : Emmet Lavery; Teleplay by : Emmet Lavery and Mark Weingart	March 20, 1963
Despite the support of his wife Phyllis and his mother, Black jazz pianist Robin Green has difficulty overcoming feelings of hostility, alienation, persecution and despair over the racial prejudice he has encountered throughout his life.: and Nydia Westman as Mrs. Featherstone; Co-Starring Ivan Dixon as Robin Green Juanita Moore as Mrs. Green; CAST Chick Chandler as Harry Grafton Frank Behrens as Frank Bennett K. T. Stevens as Estelle Bennett Gloria Calomée as Phyllis Green Stafford Repp as Sgt. Al Parker Sue Winton as The Young Woman; Norman Grabowski as The Existentialist Sandra Lyne as The Wife Dick Winslow as The Husband Robert Foulk as The Sergeant John Dennis as The 1st Policeman and James Edwards as Sgt. Fred Wilson
26	"Reformation of Willie"	Paul Stanley	Story by : Joe Connelly; Teleplay by : Dale & Katherine Eunson	March 27, 1963
Fathers Fitzgibbon and O'Malley attempt to guide neighborhood ne'er-do-well Willie Henratty towards a productive life with the help of cafe owner Mrs. Mertens.: Guest Star Ray Walston as Willie Henratty; Also Starring Jeanette Nolan as Mrs. Mertens; CAST Nydia Westman as Mrs. Featherstone Chris Warfield as Dr. Thornton Johnny Coons as Father Johnston Robert Nash as Mr. Wilson Gail Bonney as The Woman Jeff Pevney as The Boy
27	"Custody of the Child"	Paul Stewart	Story by : Mel Goldberg; Teleplay by : Mark Weingart and Mel Goldberg	April 3, 1963
Wealthy socialite Mrs. Sedgwick pays handsome David Gregory and photographer Martin Ragan to create a compromising situation against her late son's widow Edith so that lawyer Frank Baxter can help her gain custody of her granddaughter Sharon.: and Nydia Westman as Mrs. Featherstone; Co-Starring Gladys Cooper as Mrs. Sedgwick; Dianne Foster as Edith Sedgwick; Anthony Eisley as Frank Baxter; with Linden Chiles as David Gregory Don Beddoe as Martin Ragan Ann Doran as Sister Therese Joseph Downing as The Private Detective and Susan Gordon as Sharon
28	"Florence, Come Home"	Alan Crosland, Jr.	Richard Baer	April 10, 1963
Father O'Malley and police detective Dave Golden visit parishioner Harold Marlowe whose wife Florence is missing, having walked out after 25 years of marriage.: Co-Starring Betty Field as Florence Marlowe; James Westerfield as Harold Marlowe Harold J. Stone as Detective Dave Golden; CAST Nydia Westman as Mrs. Featherstone Larry Blake as Sgt. O'Brien Alice Frost as The Woman Jane Betts as Mrs. Heinrich Lennie Bremen as Charlie
29	"Hear No Evil"	Joseph Pevney	Richard Baer	April 17, 1963
George and Louise, a young married couple, both hearing-impaired, visit ear specialist Dr. Howard Stevens who can surgically repair Louise's deafness, but not George's.: and Nydia Westman as Mrs. Featherstone; Guest Star Richard Long [George Conroy]; Co-Starring Ellen McRae as Louise Conroy; CAST Whit Bissell as Dr. Howard Stevens William O'Connell as The Resident Physician Dolores Quinton as The 2nd Nurse James Doohan as The Attendant Lou Byrne as The 1st Nurse Dorothy Abbott as The Secretary Carey Loftin as The Driver
30	"A Tough Act to Follow"	Joseph Pevney	Mark Weingart	April 24, 1963
Tom Colwell decides to accept a job at an insurance company that pays twice what he earns at the youth center. The center's director, Mr. Dawson, offers Tom's position to highly qualified social worker Kathryn Fontaine who contends with troubled adolescent Danny Wojack.: and Nydia Westman as Mrs. Featherstone; Guest Star Patricia Barry as Kathryn Fontaine; Co-Starring Regis Toomey as Mr. Dawson Charles Herbert as Danny Wojack; CAST Johnny Eimen as Jerry Tommy Shaw as Mike Riki Marcelli as Fred Jack Searl as Mr. Burns Bill Halop as Mr. Thompson Vici Raaf as Mrs. Provost Henry Kulky as Mr. Rice; Iris Adrian as Mrs. Wojack Michael Webber as Al Steve Mitchell as The Policeman Jerry Davis as Jimmy Burns Harry Short as Harvey

== Production ==
Going My Way was broadcast on Wednesdays from 8:30 to 9:30 p.m. Eastern Time. Its competition included The Many Loves of Dobie Gillis, The Beverly Hillbillies, The Virginian, and Kraft Television Theatre. Joe Connelly was the producer. Directors included Joseph Pevney and Fielder Cook. Writers also included Arnold Bernstein and Emmet Lavery.

The series was produced by Revue Studios, as parent company MCA owned the rights to the original film through its subsidiary, EMKA, Ltd., which in 1957 bought Going My Way and many other pre-1950 sound feature films from Paramount Pictures.

John H. Breck, Inc. sponsored the program, promoting its Breck Shampoos. The company had sponsored some specials in previous seasons, but this was its first sponsorship of a series. The $3.2 million that it spent for 50 weeks was double what the company had spent on TV advertising in any previous year, and it matched the most that the company had spent on both TV and print advertising in any previous year. The company hoped "to attract families, with large shares of women."

The failure of the series to enter a second season is usually attributed to its competition, particularly The Beverly Hillbillies. Going My Way was also scheduled opposite the final season of The Many Loves of Dobie Gillis on CBS and last third of the 90-minute Western, The Virginian, on NBC. Aired at 8:30 pm Eastern time on Wednesdays, Going My Way followed the Western series Wagon Train on the ABC schedule. The program itself was followed on ABC by the Stanley Holloway sitcom, Our Man Higgins.

== Critical response ==
A review in the trade publication Variety said that the show had potential based on its family-show appeal and the co-stars, but it acknowledged the strength of competition on other networks. Kelly and Carroll were said to be well-cast, but the plot was described as thin.

== Home media ==
On December 6, 2011, Timeless Media Group released Going My Way: The Complete Series on DVD in Region 1.
