= Statue of Irv Kupcinet =

Statue in Chicago, Illinois, U.S.

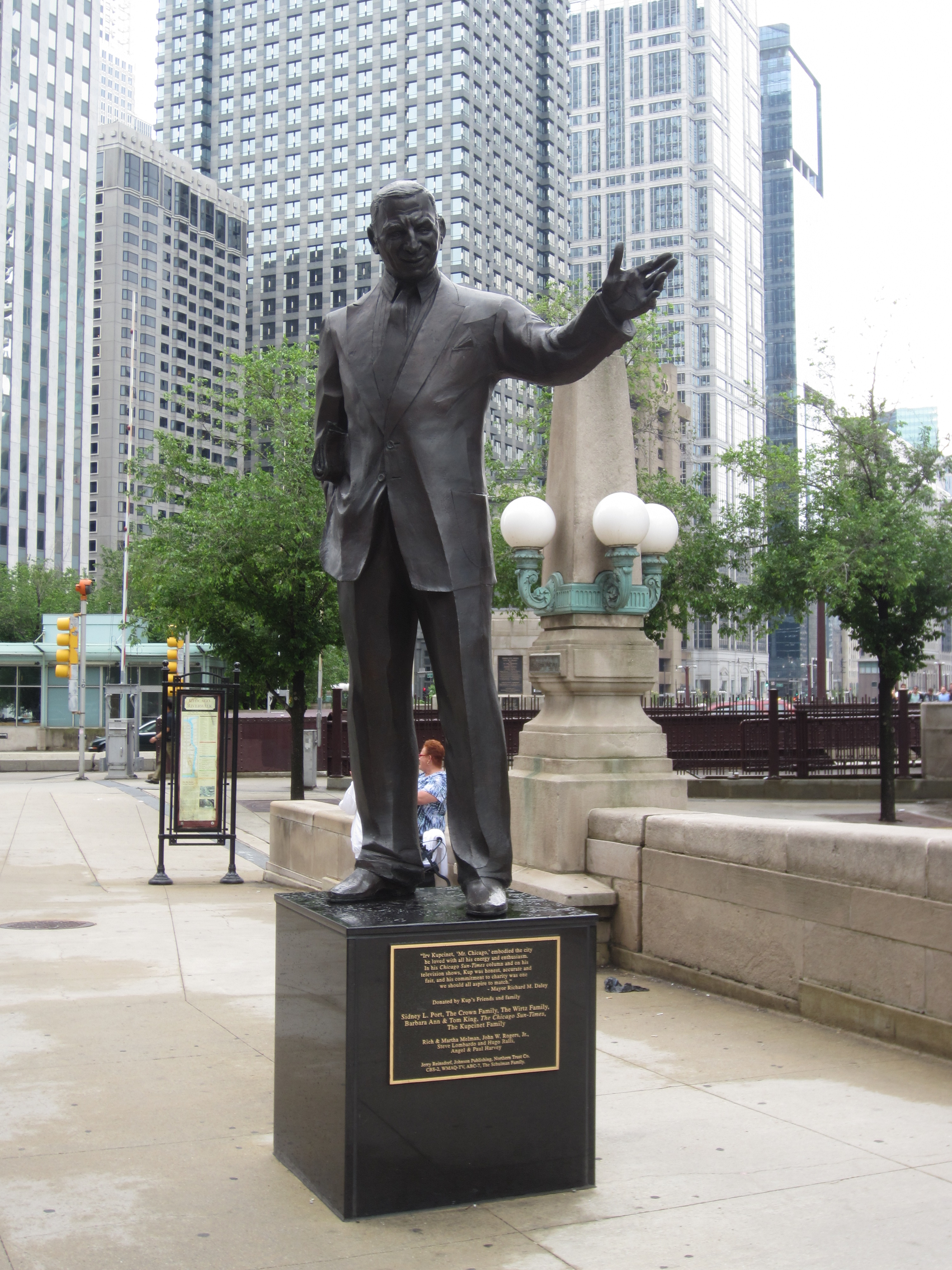
- The statue in 2015
- Artist: Preston Jackson
- Year: 2006
- Medium: Bronze sculpture
- Subject: Irv Kupcinet
- Location: Chicago, Illinois, U.S.; 41.887689°N 87.626219°W

The Irv Kupcinet statue is an outdoor bronze statue in Chicago that depicts Irv Kupcinet, the Chicago newspaper columnist and radio and TV personality.

It was designed by Preston Jackson and unveiled in 2006 on a sidewalk next to Wacker Drive near Wabash Avenue and above the Chicago Riverwalk. A plaque on the base of the statue includes a quote from former Chicago Mayor Richard M. Daley.

The statue is across the Chicago River from the former headquarters of the Chicago Sun-Times, where Kupcinet was a long-time columnist. That building was torn down in 2004. The statue was restored in the late 2010s. The nearby Wabash Avenue bridge over the Chicago River is also dedicated to Kupcinet.

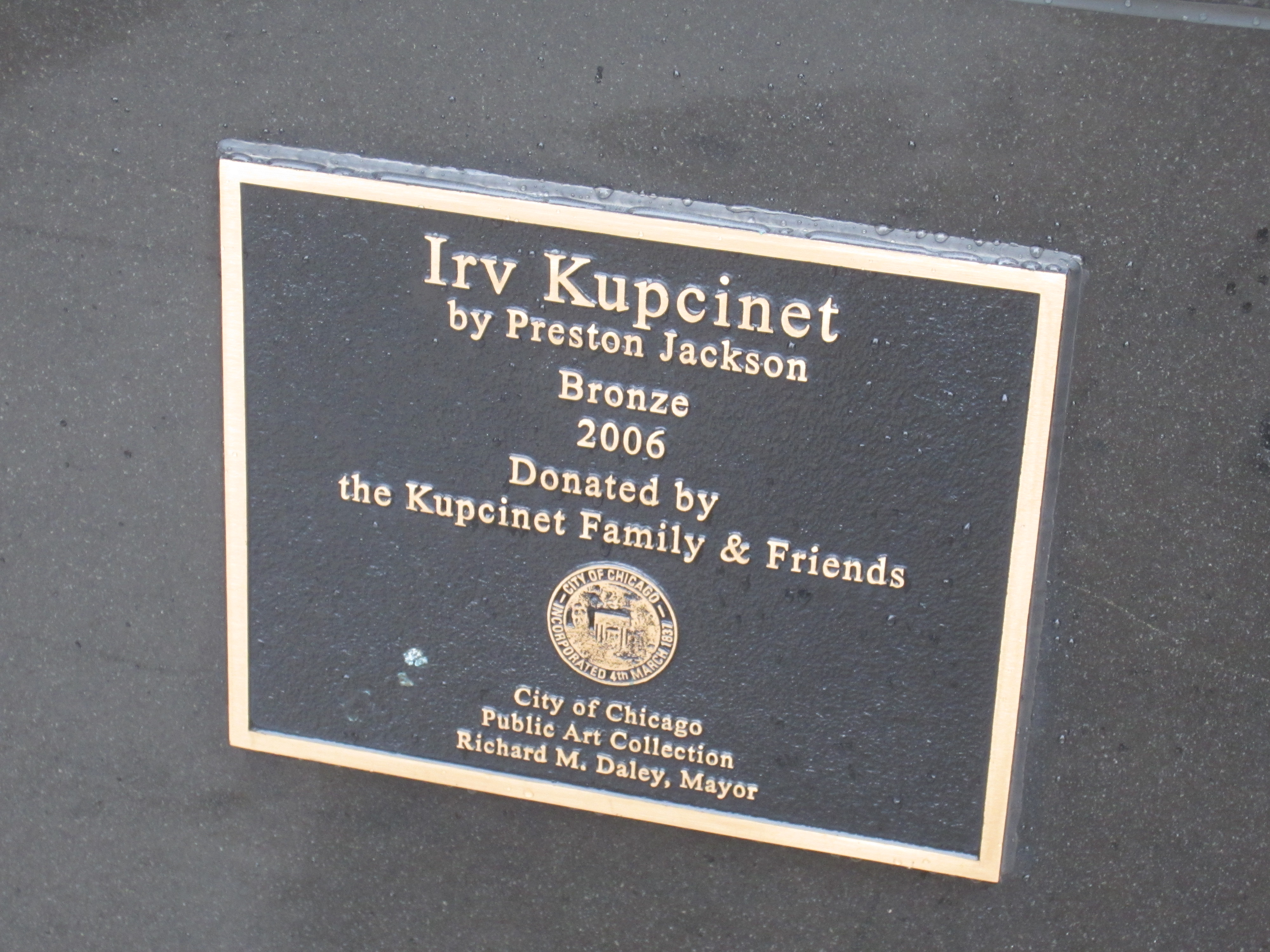
Plaque for the sculpture

== See also ==
- 2006 in art
- List of public art in Chicago
