= Mrs. G. Goes to College =

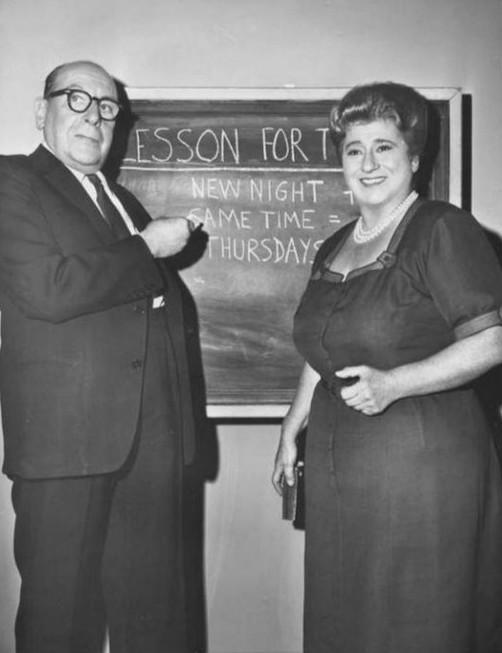
- Hardwicke and Berg, 1961
- Also known as: The Gertrude Berg Show
- Genre: Sitcom
- Written by: Gertrude Berg; Cherney Berg; Arthur Stander; James B. Allardice
- Starring: Gertrude Berg; Cedric Hardwicke; Mary Wickes; Marion Ross; Aneta Corsaut; Karyn Kupcinet; Skip Ward
- Theme music composer: Herschel Burke Gilbert
- Composers: Lionel Newman; Alfred Perry; Rudy Schrager
- Country of origin: United States
- Original language: English
- No. of seasons: 1
- No. of episodes: 26

Production
- Producer: Hy Averback
- Editor: Chandler House
- Camera setup: Single-camera
- Running time: 24–25 minutes
- Production company: Four Star-Jahfa

Original release
- Network: CBS
- Release: October 4, 1961 – April 5, 1962

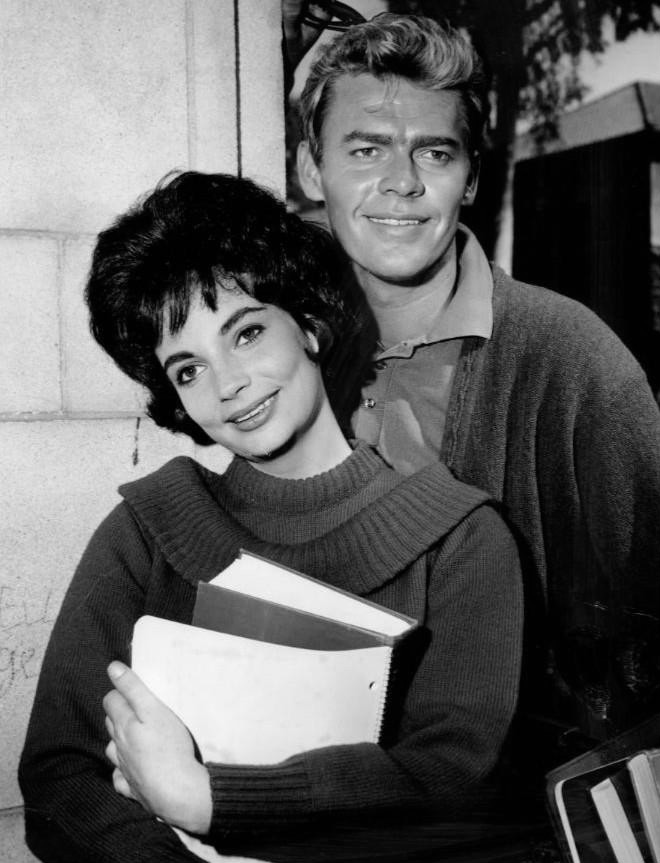
Karyn Kupcinet and Skip Ward (1961)

Mrs. G. Goes to College (retitled The Gertrude Berg Show starting with episode 14) is a 26-episode American sitcom which aired on CBS from October 4, 1961 to April 5, 1962. The series starred Emmy Award-winning actress Gertrude Berg.

== Synopsis ==
Having previously starred in the long-running radio and television series, The Goldbergs, Gertrude Berg returned to episodic television as Sarah Green, a 62-year-old widow who enters college. The character of Sarah Green (very similar to "Molly Goldberg") had been previously introduced to viewers as "Aunt Sarah" on Jackie Cooper's Hennesey sitcom on CBS earlier in 1961. English actor Cedric Hardwicke played Professor Crayton, and popular character actress Mary Wickes portrayed landlady Winona Maxfield.

Skip Ward was cast as fellow student Joe Caldwell, and Marion Ross appeared in five episodes as Berg's daughter, Susan Green. Aneta Corsaut (the future Helen Crump on The Andy Griffith Show) appeared in 13 episodes as Irma Howell, a professor's wife. Karyn Kupcinet played Carol, a young fellow student of Sarah Green.

The plot centers on Sarah Green, a widow in her early sixties, who decides to acquire higher education, matriculates in her hometown college and interacts with, among others, her Cambridge University exchange professor (Cedric Hardwicke) and next-door neighbor George Howell (Paul Smith), a character analogous to Smith's Roy Norris from Fibber McGee and Molly, complete with a no-nonsense wife (Aneta Corsaut).

The series aired during the 9:30 Eastern slot on Wednesdays, under the sponsorship of General Foods, following CBS's Checkmate. Mrs. G. Goes to College aired during the second half of ABC's Hawaiian Eye and NBC's Perry Como's Kraft Music Hall. Nielsen ratings were mediocre. After thirteen episodes, a midseason move from Wednesday to Thursday night, along with a title change designed to emphasize Berg's name, The Gertrude Berg Show, did not improve the Nielsen ratings for the remaining thirteen episodes. CBS abruptly cancelled the series in April 1962 without showing any repeats.

Beginning in March 2017, the series was shown on get TV. From April 2018, the show was aired in the UK on Talking Pictures TV.

== Production notes ==
Mrs. G. Goes to College was released by Dick Powell's Four Star Television. The series was produced by Hy Averback, the music was by Herschel Burke Gilbert.

Co-star Cedric Hardwicke, in a 1962 TV Guide article that focused on his work in the series, and references him as "Sir Cedric," is quoted as commenting, "If you're going to work in rubbish, you might as well get paid for it."

== Episodes ==
No.	Title	Original release date
1	"The First Day"	October 4, 1961
2	"First Test"	October 11, 1961
Guest star Peter Lorre.
3	"Sam's Car"	October 18, 1961
4	"Lonely Sunday"	October 25, 1961
5	"Mrs. G. Meets Dr. Hennessey"	November 1, 1961
6	"The Baby Affair"	November 8, 1961
7	"Crayton on TV"	November 15, 1961
8	"Red, Red Rose"	November 22, 1961
9	"Romance for Maxie"	November 29, 1961
10	"The Trouble with Crayton"	December 6, 1961
Guest star Peter Lorre.
11	"The Teacher"	December 13, 1961
12	"Mrs. G. Meets the Faculty"	December 20, 1961
13	"Mrs. G.'s Private Telephone"	December 27, 1961
14	"Maxie's Silent Partner"	January 11, 1962
Starting with this episode the series is called The Gertrude Berg Show.
15	"Mrs. G. Versus the Kingston Trio"	January 18, 1962
16	"Sunday Dinner"	January 25, 1962
17	"The Mother Affair"	February 1, 1962
Guest star Arlene Francis.
18	"Peace Corps"	February 8, 1962
Guest star Fabian Forte.
19	"Goodbye Mr. Howell"	February 15, 1962
Guests William Windom, Doris Singleton and Ken Berry.
20	"How Now, Brown Cow?"	February 22, 1962
21	"High Finance"	March 1, 1962
22	"One of Our Books Is Missing"	March 8, 1962
Guest Vaughn Taylor.
23	"Curfew Shall Not Ring Tonight"	March 15, 1962
24	"Gentleman Caller"	March 22, 1962
25	"Dad's Day"	March 29, 1962
26	"The Bird"	April 5, 1962

== Awards and nominations ==
Year	Award	Category	Recipient	Result
1961	American Cinema Editors Awards	Best Edited Television Program	Chandler House (for "A Lonely Sunday")	Nominated
1962	Primetime Emmy Awards	Outstanding Continued Performance by an Actress in a Series (Lead)	Gertrude Berg	Nominated
1962	Primetime Emmy Awards	Outstanding Performance in a Supporting Role by an Actress	Mary Wickes	Nominated
