= Dennis Rush =

American actor (1951–2026)

- Dennis Rush in The Andy Griffith Show episode "Andy Discovers America"
- Born: June 10, 1951; Philadelphia, Pennsylvania, U.S.
- Died: May 9, 2026 (aged 74); San Diego, California, U.S.

Dennis Rush (June 10, 1951 – May 9, 2026) was an American actor.

== Life and career ==
Rush was born in Philadelphia, Pennsylvania, on June 10, 1951. He relocated to Los Angeles as a child, due to his father, Jack, accepting a job as a film archivist at Universal Studios.

He was discovered at the age of five by James Cagney, who landed him his first role in Man of a Thousand Faces. He made a number of appearances on Alfred Hitchcock Presents and The Lucy Show. He is most known for the role of Opie Taylor's friend Howie on The Andy Griffith Show.

Rush died whilst en route to a hospital in San Diego on May 9, 2026, at the age of 74.
