= Jerry Kupcinet =

American television director and producer (1944–2019)

Jerry Solomon Kupcinet (1944–2019) was a Daytime Emmy Award winning director and producer.

== Early life ==
Kupcinet was born on November 1, 1944, the son of newspaper columnist Irv Kupcinet and Esther Kupcinet (née Solomon). He is the younger brother of Karyn Kupcinet, an actress who was found murdered in her West Hollywood, California apartment in November 1963. Her murder was never solved. He was of Russian Jewish ancestry.

== Career ==
Kupcinet directed shows such as Judge Judy, Judge Joe Brown, 20/20, Home, That's Incredible!, The Live Aid concert, The Dating Game, The Richard Simmons Show, Entertainment Tonight and many others.

He created, co-executive produced, and sold to Fox the three-time Emmy winning Cristina's Court. He also created, directed and exec-produced Vegas Night Court with Oscar Goodman.

Kupcinet is credited with the highest rated quarter–hour period in television history when, in 1986, he produced and directed the Jerry Lewis Telethon and created a three-way-split between the MD Telethon’s ad–hoc network, ABC’s Good Morning America and The Today Show on NBC.

Kupcinet produced and directed commercials and infomercials for Richard Simmons, Susan Powter, and Phil Tyne's Work Outs.

Kupcinet was credited with creating the look and formula for the popular syndicated courtroom show Judge Judy. In 2000 he was nominated for a Daytime Emmy for his work on the show.

== Personal life ==
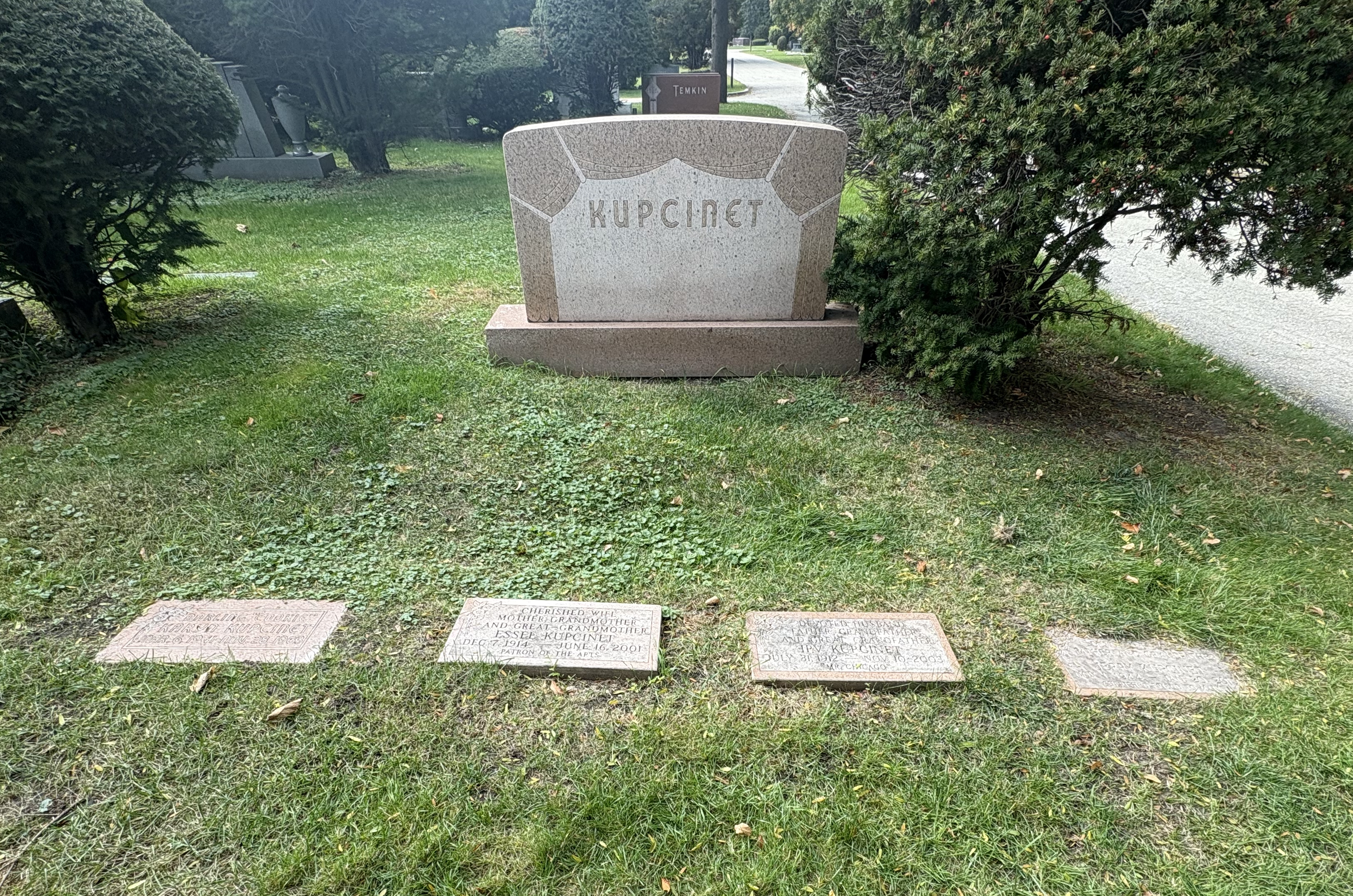
Graves of Karyn, Esther, Irv, and Jerry Kupcinet at Memorial Park Cemetery

Kupcinet was married to Sue; the couple had two children, daughter Kari and son David.

He died on January 20, 2019, and was buried at Memorial Park Cemetery in Skokie, Illinois.
