= Irv Kupcinet =

American columnist, broadcaster (1912–2003)

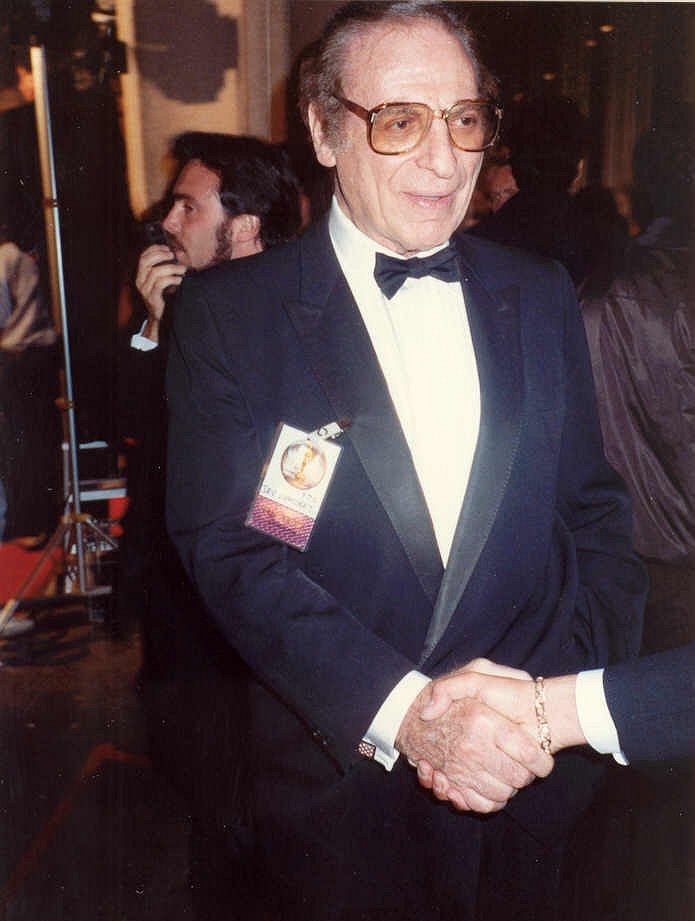
- Kupcinet at the 62nd Academy Awards in 1990
- Born: Irving Kupcinet; July 31, 1912; North Lawndale, Chicago, Illinois, U.S.
- Died: November 10, 2003 (aged 91); Chicago, Illinois, U.S.
- Other name: Kup
- Education: Harrison Technical High School; University of North Dakota
- Occupations: Newspaper columnist, talk-show host, and radio personality
- Spouse: Esther Solomon (m. 1939; died 2001)
- Children: Karyn Kupcinet; Jerry Kupcinet
- Football career

No. 31
- Position: Quarterback

Personal information
- Listed height: 6 ft 1 in (1.85 m)
- Listed weight: 190 lb (86 kg)

Career information
- College: North Dakota; Northwestern

Career history
- Philadelphia Eagles (1935)

Career statistics
- Passing yards: 6
- Passer rating: 39.6
- Games started: 1
- Stats at Pro Football Reference

Irving Kupcinet (July 31, 1912 – November 10, 2003) was an American newspaper columnist for the Chicago Sun-Times, television talk-show host, and radio personality based in Chicago, Illinois. He was popularly known by the nickname "Kup".

His daily "Kup's Column" was launched in 1943 and remained a fixture in the Sun-Times for the next six decades.

== Early life ==
Kupcinet was youngest of four children born to Russian Jewish immigrants in the North Lawndale neighborhood of Chicago. While attending Harrison Technical High School, he became editor of the school newspaper and the senior class president. He eventually won a football scholarship to Northwestern University, but a scuffle with another student led to his transferring to the University of North Dakota.

== Career ==
Upon graduating from college, Kupcinet was signed by the Philadelphia Eagles football team in 1935. His football career was cut short due to a shoulder injury, which led him to take a job as a sports writer for the Chicago Daily Times in 1935.

While writing his sports column, Kupcinet also wrote a short "People" section that became officially known as "Kup's Column", which chronicled the nightlife of Chicago, along with celebrity and political gossip. After the Chicago Sun and the Chicago Daily Times combined in 1948 to form the Chicago Sun-Times, "Kup's Column" would eventually be distributed to more than 100 newspapers around the world.

In 1952, Kupcinet became a pioneer in the television talk-show genre when he landed his own talk show. In 1957, he was one of the set of hosts who replaced Steve Allen on The Tonight Show, before Jack Paar was brought in to change the program's format. Kupcinet's own series ran from 1959 until 1986 and was, at one point, syndicated to over 70 stations throughout the United States. Originally titled At Random and broadcast live from midnight (or later) with no pre-determined ending time, in 1962 it was renamed Kup's Show. The series garnered 15 Emmy Awards, along with a Peabody Award.

In addition to writing his newspaper column and hosting a talk-show, from 1953 to 1976 Kupcinet provided commentary for radio broadcasts of Chicago Bears football games with Jack Brickhouse and was affectionately mocked for the signature phrase, "Dat's right, Jack".

=== Film cameos ===
Kupcinet made cameo appearances in two films directed by Otto Preminger – 1959's Anatomy of a Murder and the 1962 drama Advise and Consent.

== Awards and honors ==
In 1982, Kupcinet was elected to Chicago's Journalism Hall of Fame.

A statue of Kupcinet was erected in 2006, three years after his death, along Wacker Drive in Chicago, across the Chicago River from the site of the old Chicago Sun-Times building. A plaque on the base of the statue includes a quote by Chicago Mayor Richard M. Daley.

== Published works ==
In 1988, Kupcinet published his autobiography, Kup: A Man, an Era, a City.

== Personal life ==
Kupcinet met Esther "Essee" Solomon while she was a Northwestern student, and married her in 1939. The couple had two children; a daughter, Karyn in 1941, and a son, Jerry in 1944.

The Kupcinets' daughter, Karyn, moved to Hollywood in the early 1960s to pursue an acting career. On November 30, 1963, her nude body was found in her West Hollywood apartment. Her mysterious death, ruled to be a homicide by strangulation because her hyoid bone had been broken, was never solved. The Kupcinets established a theater named in her honor at Shimer College, then located in Mount Carroll, Illinois. Before the murder, Irv Kupcinet had been aware of his daughter's close relationship with actor Andrew Prine, and the three of them had been photographed together at a public event in Los Angeles. Irv Kupcinet conferred with Los Angeles County Sheriff's Department investigators and hired a private investigator, and he soon came to believe Prine had nothing to do with the murder. Sheriff's Department investigators never made an arrest.

Kupcinet's wife Essee died in 2001; they were married for 62 years.

== Death ==
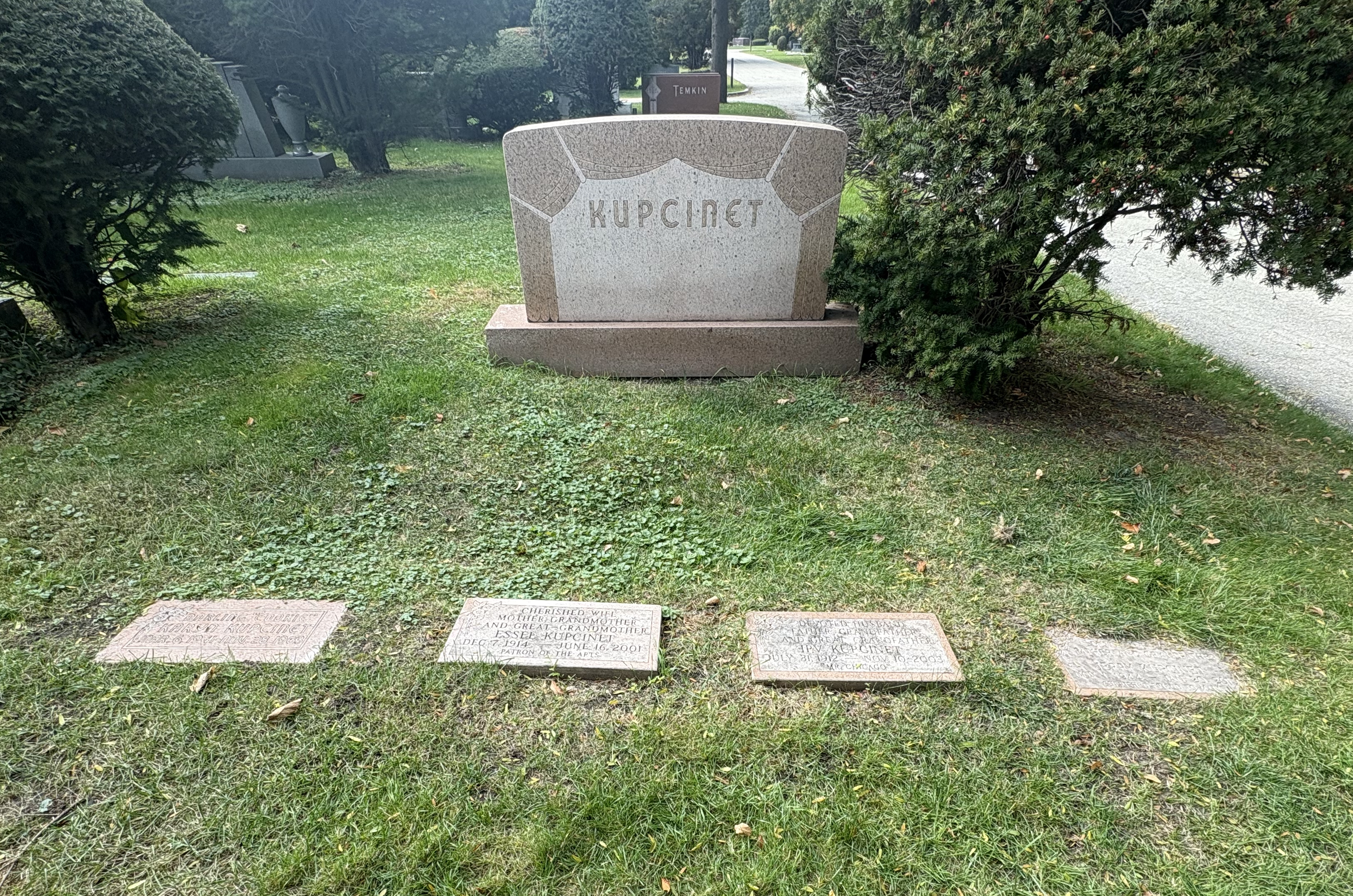
Graves of Karyn, Essee, Irv, and Jerry Kupcinet at Memorial Park Cemetery

On November 10, 2003, Kupcinet died from respiratory complications from pneumonia at Northwestern Memorial Hospital, in Chicago. He was 91 years old. He was buried at Memorial Park Cemetery in Skokie.

== Filmography ==
Year	Title	Role	Notes
1959	Anatomy of a Murder	Distinguished Gentleman	Uncredited
1962	Advise & Consent	Journalist	

== See also ==
- Statue of Irv Kupcinet (2006), Chicago
