= Jerry Ziesmer =

American film director (1939–2021)

- Publicity Photo of Jerry Ziesmer
- Born: May 31, 1939; Milwaukee, Wisconsin, U.S
- Died: August 1, 2021 (aged 82)
- Education: Northwestern University (Bachelor's Degree); UCLA (Master's Degree) Directors Guild of America (Training Certificate for Assistant Directors)
- Occupations: Assistant director; Production manager; Actor
- Years active: 1969–2021

Jerry Ziesmer (May 31, 1939 – August 1, 2021) was an American assistant director, production manager and occasional actor. He is best known for his role as Jerry in the 1979 film Apocalypse Now in which he delivers the infamous line "terminate with extreme prejudice". His character is suspected to be a part of CORDS or DOD Command Staff.

== Early life ==
Jerry Ziesmer was born in Milwaukee, Wisconsin, to a postal employee and his wife, who was the daughter of Dutch immigrants. He graduated on a scholarship from Milwaukee's Rufus King High School in 1957. He received a bachelor's degree in acting from Northwestern University in 1961. After graduation he moved to Beverly Hills and took a job as a United States Post Office employee and later, a part-time junior high school teacher. In 1964 he married Mary Kate Denny, with whom he had three children. He later obtained a master's degree from UCLA. He received a Directors Guild training certificate for assistant directors in 1969, applying to the program after reading an advertisement in Variety.

== Career ==
Ziesmer worked on more than 50 films, usually in the role of assistant director. His first uncredited film job was as a trainee in Hello, Dolly!. His credits include The Way We Were, Close Encounters of the Third Kind, Scarface, Illegally Yours, Midnight Run, History of the World, Part I, Annie, Say Anything, Almost Famous, and Jerry Maguire. He took small acting parts in some of his films, for example playing a pilot in Blue Thunder and a salesman in Rocky II. His most famous role is as a civilian intelligence officer named Jerry in Francis Ford Coppola's Vietnam War film, Apocalypse Now, in which he utters what some call the film's most memorable line, "Terminate, with extreme prejudice", to instruct the film's lead character to carry out an assassination. Coppola, who had searched for a suitable actor for months, gave the role to Ziesmer at the spur of the moment.

In 2000 Ziesmer wrote a memoir, Ready when You Are, Mr. Coppola, Mr. Spielberg, Mr. Crowe, that recounts his experiences working with some of Hollywood's most popular stars.

Ziesmer served on the council of the Directors Guild of America from 1987 to 1998, for three years as the chair. He helped establish a mentorship program for women and non-white directors. For many years he and his wife, Suzanne, taught an Assistant Director's course at UCLA's Extension school. In 2006, he won the DGA's "Frank Capra Achievement Award", a career award given to assistant directors.

== Personal life ==
In 1981, Ziesmer re-met and began dating his high school girlfriend and 1957 prom date, Suzanne. They married in 1982. Suzanne joined him on-set, tutoring actors including Mel Gibson.

Ziesmer died on August 1, 2021, at the age of 82.

== Filmography ==
=== As actor ===
Year	Film	Role
1978	The Bad News Bears Go to Japan	Eddie of Network
1979	Apocalypse Now	Jerry
1979	Rocky II	Salesman
1982	Lights, Camera, Annie!	Self
1983	Blue Thunder	Pilot
1989	Say Anything...	U.S Attorney
1992	Singles	Jordan Fisher
1996	Jerry Maguire	Trainer
