= Karyn Kupcinet =

American actress (1941–1963)

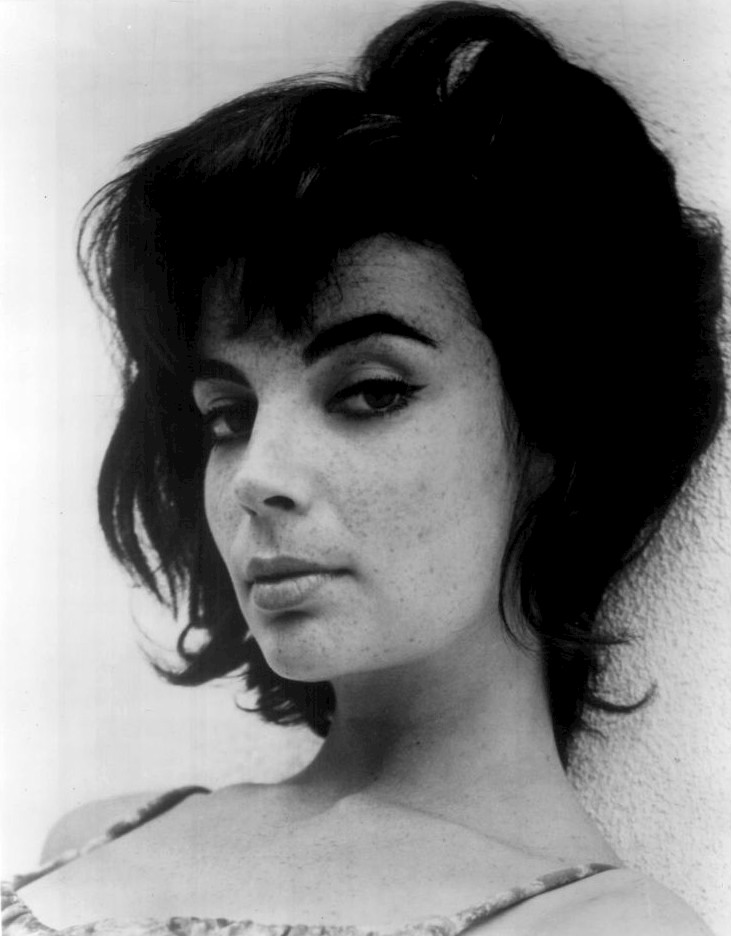
- Kupcinet in 1962
- Born: Roberta Lynn Kupcinet; March 6, 1941; Chicago, Illinois, U.S.
- Died: November 28, 1963 (aged 22); West Hollywood, California, U.S.
- Cause of death: Homicide
- Resting place: Memorial Park Cemetery, Skokie
- Education: Pine Manor College
- Occupation: Actress
- Years active: 1959–1963
- Father: Irv Kupcinet

Karyn Kupcinet (born Roberta Lynn Kupcinet; March 6, 1941 – November 28, 1963) was an American stage, film, and television actress. She was the daughter of Chicago newspaper columnist and television personality Irv Kupcinet and the sister of television director and producer Jerry Kupcinet.

On November 28, 1963, six days after the assassination of John F. Kennedy, Kupcinet was found dead in her home in West Hollywood, California. Her death was officially ruled an unsolved homicide. Because it occurred shortly after the assassination, her name was referenced in a number of conspiracy theories surrounding the event, although law enforcement has not established a connection. Irv Kupcinet publicly rejected suggestions linking his daughter to the assassination, and in 1992 criticized NBC's Today for referencing such claims. Her death remains officially unsolved.

== Early life ==
Karyn Kupcinet was born Roberta Lynn Kupcinet in Chicago, Illinois, to Irv Kupcinet, then a sportswriter for the Chicago Daily Times, and his wife, Esther "Essee" Kupcinet (née Solomon). She had one younger brother, Jerry Kupcinet, who later worked as a director and producer in syndicated television. The family was of Russian-Jewish ancestry. During childhood, she acquired the nickname Cookie and later adopted the stage name Karyn.

Kupcinet made her acting debut at age 13 in a Chicago production of Anniversary Waltz. By this time, her father had moved from sportswriting to entertainment journalism and, beginning in 1953, hosted the 15-minute television talk show Kup’s Corner on WBBM-TV. Kupcinet attended Pine Manor College in Massachusetts for a semester before studying acting at the Actors Studio in New York City.

== Career ==
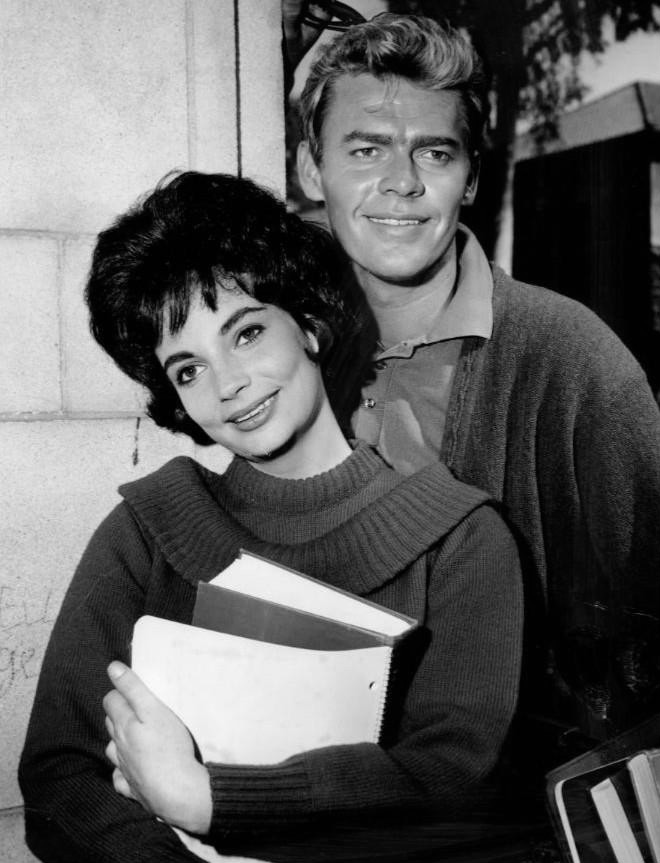
Kupcinet with Skip Ward in Mrs. G. Goes to College, 1961

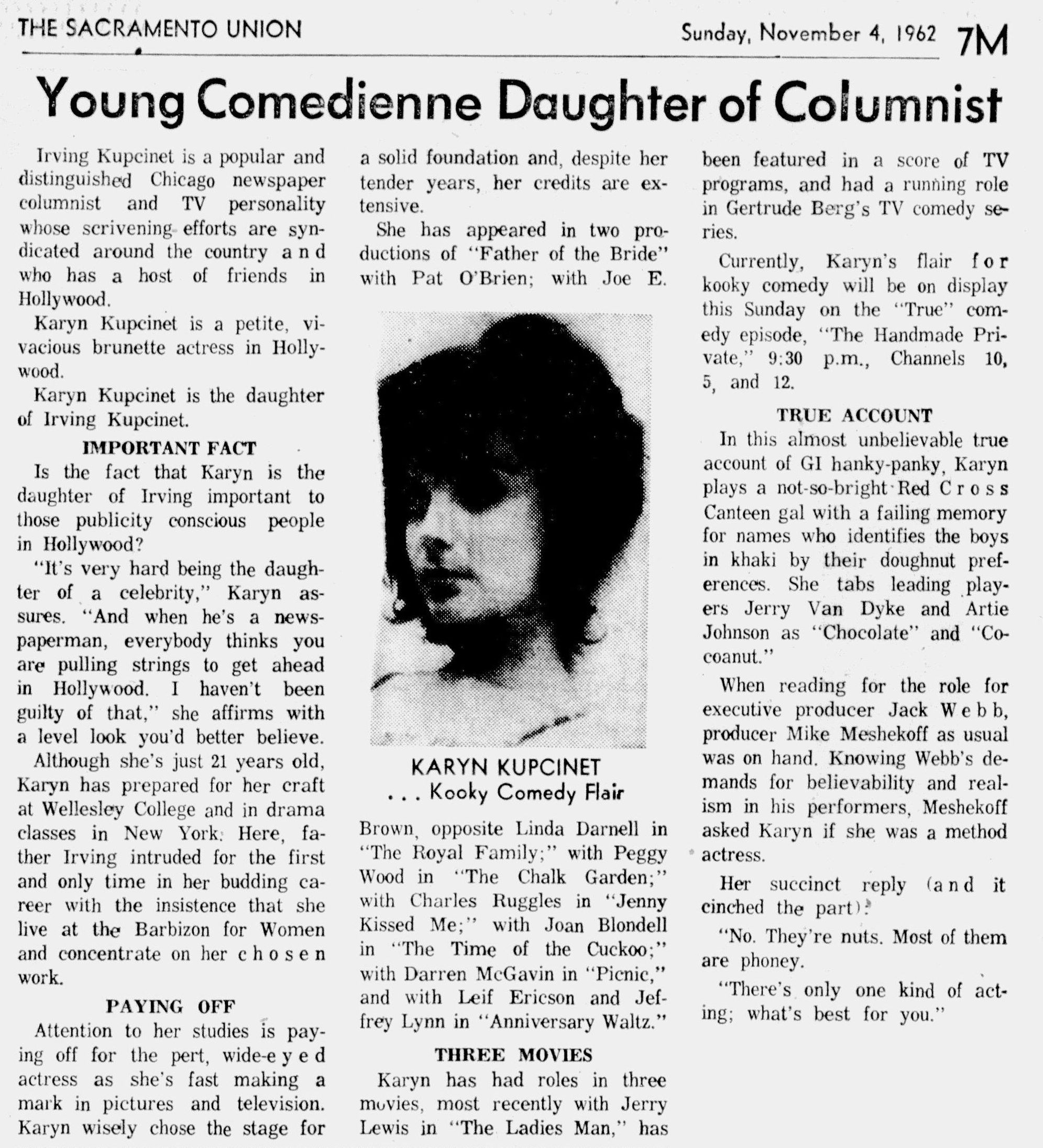
Young Comedienne Daughter of Colunist. The Sacramento Union. Sunday, Nov 4, 1962

Kupcinet worked as a model and stage actress before moving to Hollywood. Her mother, Essee Kupcinet, encouraged her early involvement in performance and arranged her first public appearance as a baby clothing model at five-and-a-half months old. Kupcinet continued modeling throughout childhood, appearing in advertisements in national newspapers and magazines and later in television commercials. She began taking acting lessons at a young age, performed memorized scenes for family and friends, and appeared in children’s theater productions.

She made her professional stage debut in 1955 at age 13 in the Chicago production of Anniversary Waltz, understudying Carol Lynley. Kupcinet attended the Francis W. Parker School in Chicago, where she participated in school theater productions and graduated in 1958. She briefly studied at Pine Manor College and took part in a Harvard University Drama Club production before attending the Actors Studio in New York City, studying under instructors including Lee Strasberg, Herbert Bergof, Marc Daniels, and Martha Graham.

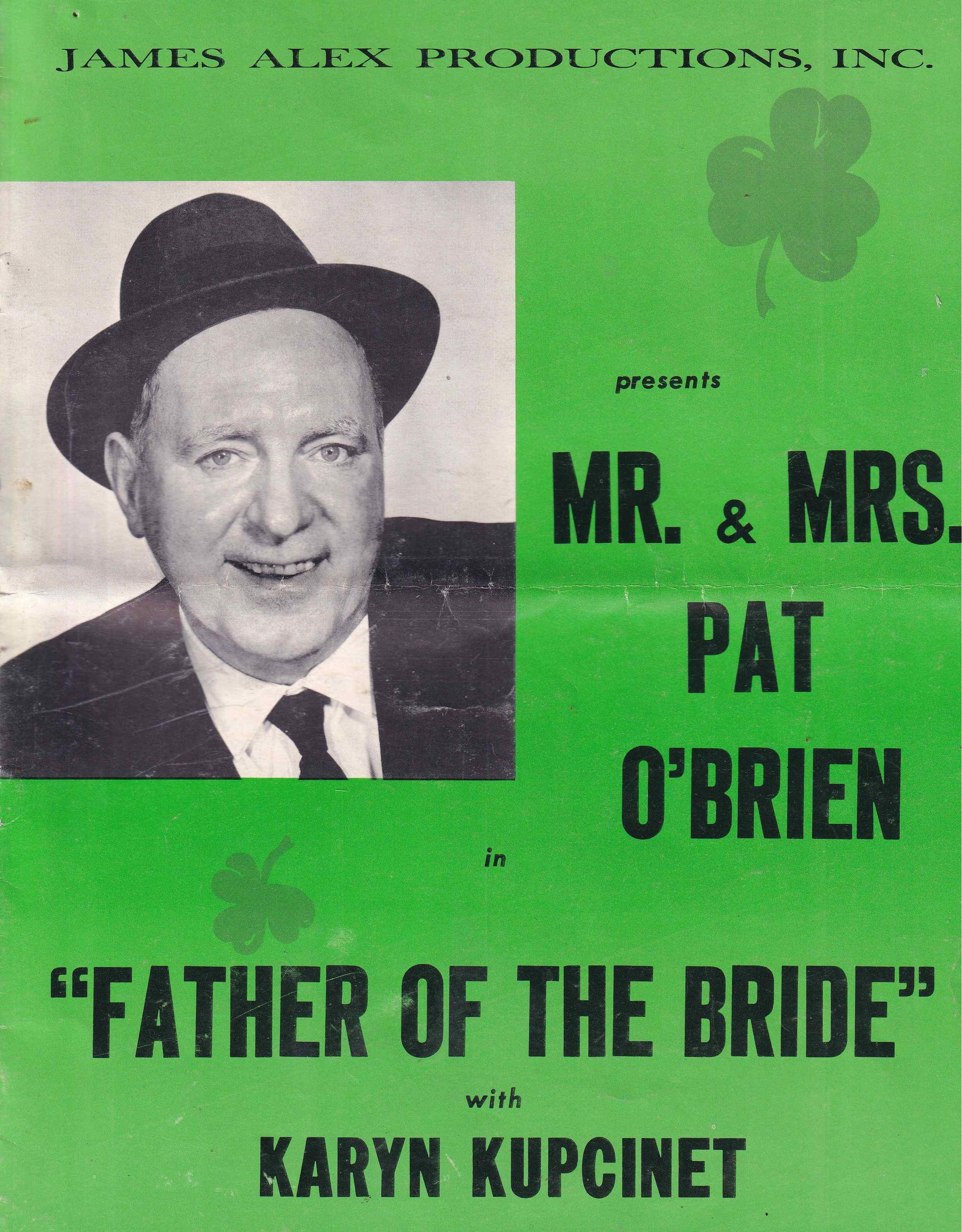
James Alex Productions program for Father of the Bride.

By the time she relocated to California at age 20, Kupcinet had appeared in a number of stage productions, including The Apollo of Bellac, The Royal Family, The Chalk Garden, Jenny Kissed Me, Time of the Cuckoo, and Picnic. She later performed in Father of the Bride in Florida alongside Pat O’Brien.

Kupcinet’s screen work included film, television, and commercials. Irv Kupcinet's friendship with Jerry Lewis led to an early speaking part for Karyn in The Ladies Man (1961), directed by Lewis. She subsequently guest-starred on series including The Donna Reed Show, Wide Country, GE True, Going My Way, and Death Valley Days. She also held a regular role on the prime-time series Mrs. G. Goes to College (later retitled The Gertrude Berg Show). In 1962 she continued stage work, appearing in The Miracle Worker at the Laguna Beach Summer Theatre, returning to Father of the Bride, and performing in Sunday in New York in Chicago.

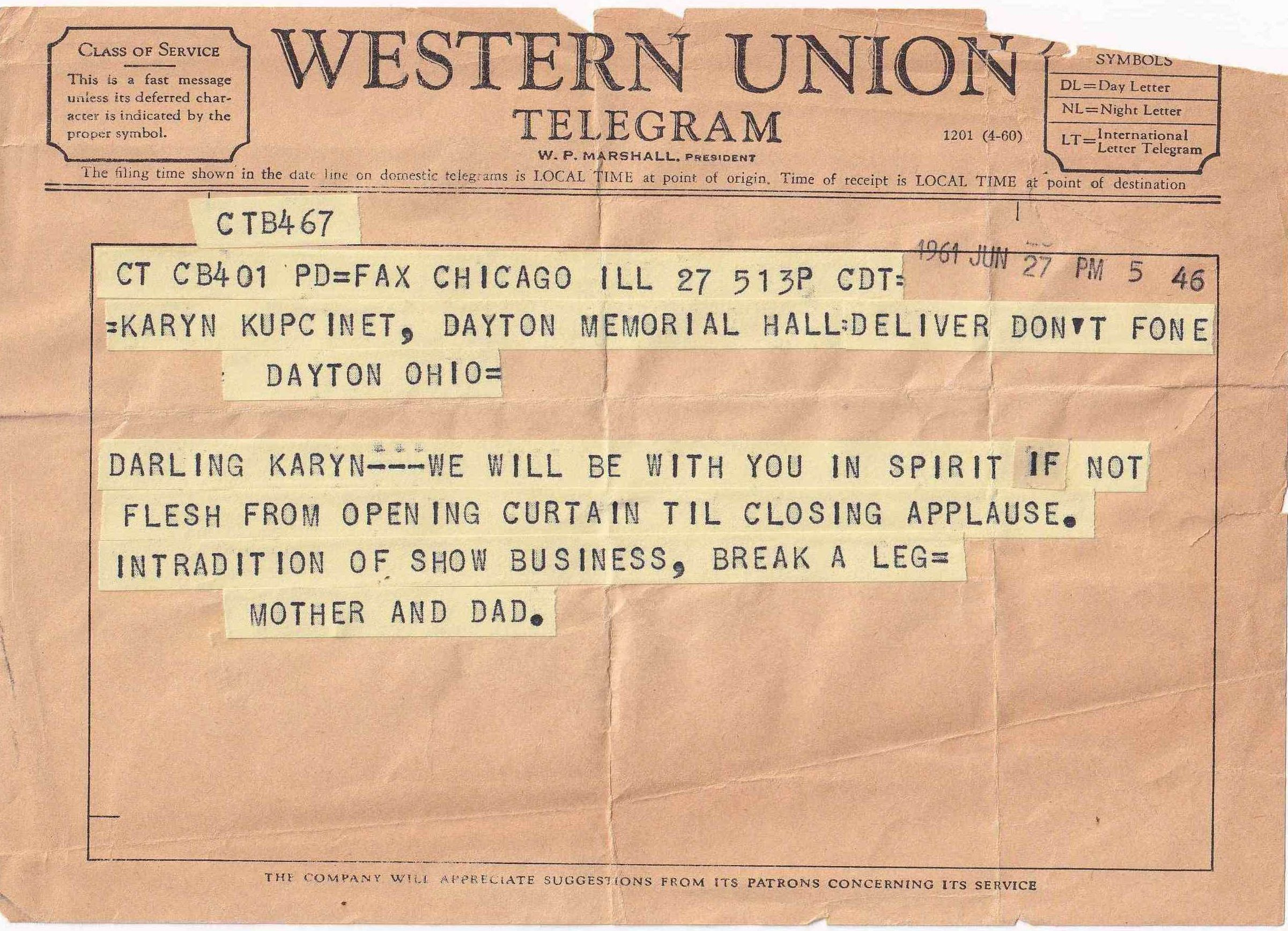
Telegram sent to Karyn by her mother on eve of a performance on stage in Dayton, Ohio.

Kupcinet’s final television appearance was as Penny Ames in a January 16, 1964 episode of Perry Mason titled "The Case of the Capering Camera" which aired after her death.

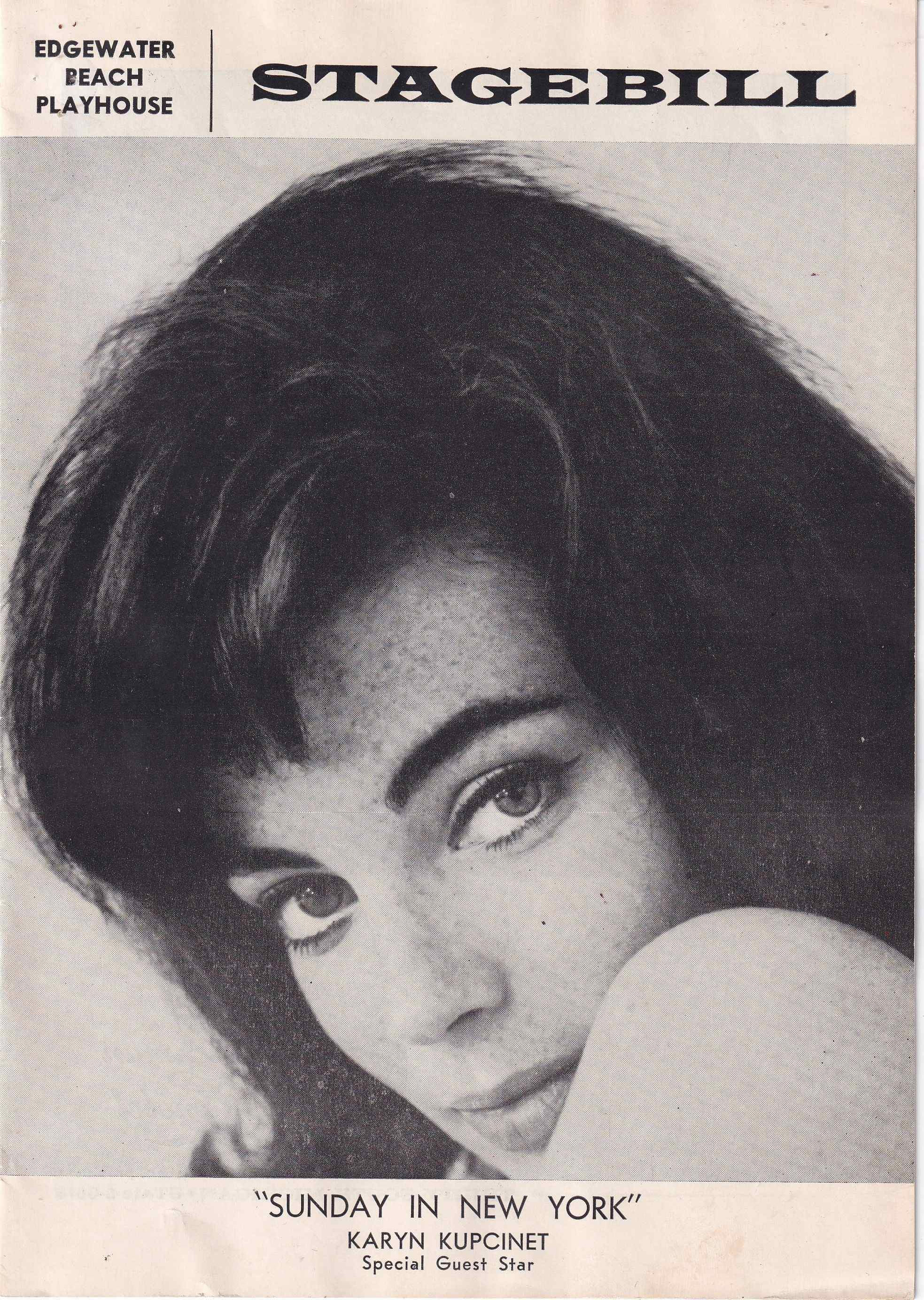
Edgewater Beach Playhouse Stagebill for 'Sunday in New York'.

== Personal life ==
By 1961, Kupcinet had relocated to Hollywood and received positive reviews for her acting work. She became involved in a relationship with actor Skip Ward, whom she met while working on a television series.

In the summer of 1962, she was arrested in Pomona, California, for shoplifting from a bookstore.

In December 1962, Kupcinet guest-starred on The Wide Country, where she met series actor Andrew Prine. The two began dating, though the relationship was marked by differing expectations; Kupcinet sought monogamy, while Prine, recently divorced, continued to date others. Following an alleged abortion in July 1963, the relationship became increasingly strained. Prine continued seeing other people, and Kupcinet began stalking Prine and his new partner. On one occasion, after Prine and a companion heard noises in his attic and contacted police, officers found Kupcinet there.

After her death, an investigation by the Los Angeles County Sheriff’s Department determined that Kupcinet had sent anonymous, threatening, and profane messages, consisting of words and letters she had cut out of magazines, to Prine and to herself. Fingerprints matching hers were later found on the notes and on the tape used to attach them.

Kupcinet had struggled with weight concerns beginning in high school, when she began using diet pills. Pressure to maintain a slim appearance increased after her casting in The Ladies Man, and she subsequently used diet pills and other prescription drugs. A Los Angeles Times interviewer, assigned to help Kupcinet promote The Gertrude Berg Show in March 1962, noted her talking exclusively about food and her weight.

An excerpt from Kupcinet's diary, published decades later, reflected her view of Hollywood as an emotionally demanding environment.

== Death ==
On November 28, 1963, Kupcinet had dinner with actor Mark Goddard and his wife, Marcia Rogers Goddard, at their home in Beverly Hills, California. Although expected at 6:30 p.m., she arrived by taxicab about an hour late. The Goddards later reported that she scarcely ate and appeared physically unsettled, noting "her lips seemed numb. Her voice was funny. She moved her head at odd angles" and that her pupils were constricted. When Mark confronted Kupcinet about her behavior, she began to cry and put her arm around him. At one point during the meal, she told an unsubstantiated story about a baby that had been abandoned on her doorstep earlier that day. She left by taxicab at approximately 8:30 p.m., stating she would call the couple.

After returning to her apartment, Kupcinet was visited by writer Edward Stephen Rubin, and later by actor Robert Hathaway. According to their statements to authorities, the three watched television and had coffee until Kupcinet fell asleep on the couch. She later went to her bedroom, and Rubin and Hathaway departed around 11:15 p.m., locking the door behind them. Hathaway stated that he returned home and was later joined by Andrew Prine, and the two spent several hours talking and watching television.

When Kupcinet did not telephone them as she had said she would, the Goddards went to her apartment on November 30. They discovered her deceased on the couch and notified the authorities. Investigators found multiple prescription medications in the residence. A note reflecting her thoughts about personal matters was also found. The coroner, Harold Kane, determined that a fracture of the hyoid bone indicated Kupcinet had been strangled, and her death was ruled a homicide.

Detectives concluded that the story Kupcinet had told regarding an abandoned baby on her doorstep was unfounded. Investigators informed the Federal Bureau of Investigation that they believed she may have been showering prior to her death and may have opened the door to someone she knew.

=== Theories ===
==== Irv Kupcinet opinion on Karyn's death ====
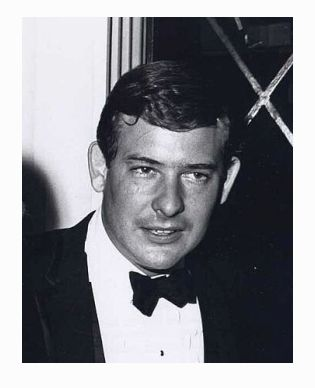
David Lange in 1963

Andrew Prine told investigators that he had spoken with Kupcinet by telephone on the day before she died. Law enforcement also questioned members of the Hollywood community, including Edward Stephen Rubin and Robert Hathaway, who were believed to have been among the last to see her. Both men were considered possible suspects during the investigation.

In his 1988 memoir, Irv Kupcinet wrote that he and his wife did not believe Prine was involved in their daughter’s death. He indicated that they instead regarded another acquaintance, actor and producer David Lange, as a potential suspect, citing information they had been given during the investigation. According to the memoir, Lange lived in the same apartment building as Kupcinet, and a witness reported hearing unusual activity on the night her body was discovered. The memoir also referenced a statement from an individual who claimed Lange had privately admitted responsibility; however, according to Irv Kupcinet, authorities reported being unable to pursue the matter further because Lange obtained legal representation and declined to answer questions. The case remains officially unsolved.

Later in the 1960s, David Lange moved from Los Angeles to New York. The next public display of his name occurred in 1971 when the movie Klute, a box office success, listed him in the credits as “co-producer.” The screenplay, written by Andy Lewis and his brother Dave Lewis, was filmed entirely on location in New York City in 1970. It is about an aspiring stage actress who has turned to prostitution to pay the rent in a brownstone on Manhattan’s West 43rd Street, and she is repeatedly harassed by telephone and stalked by a man whom she met once a long time ago.

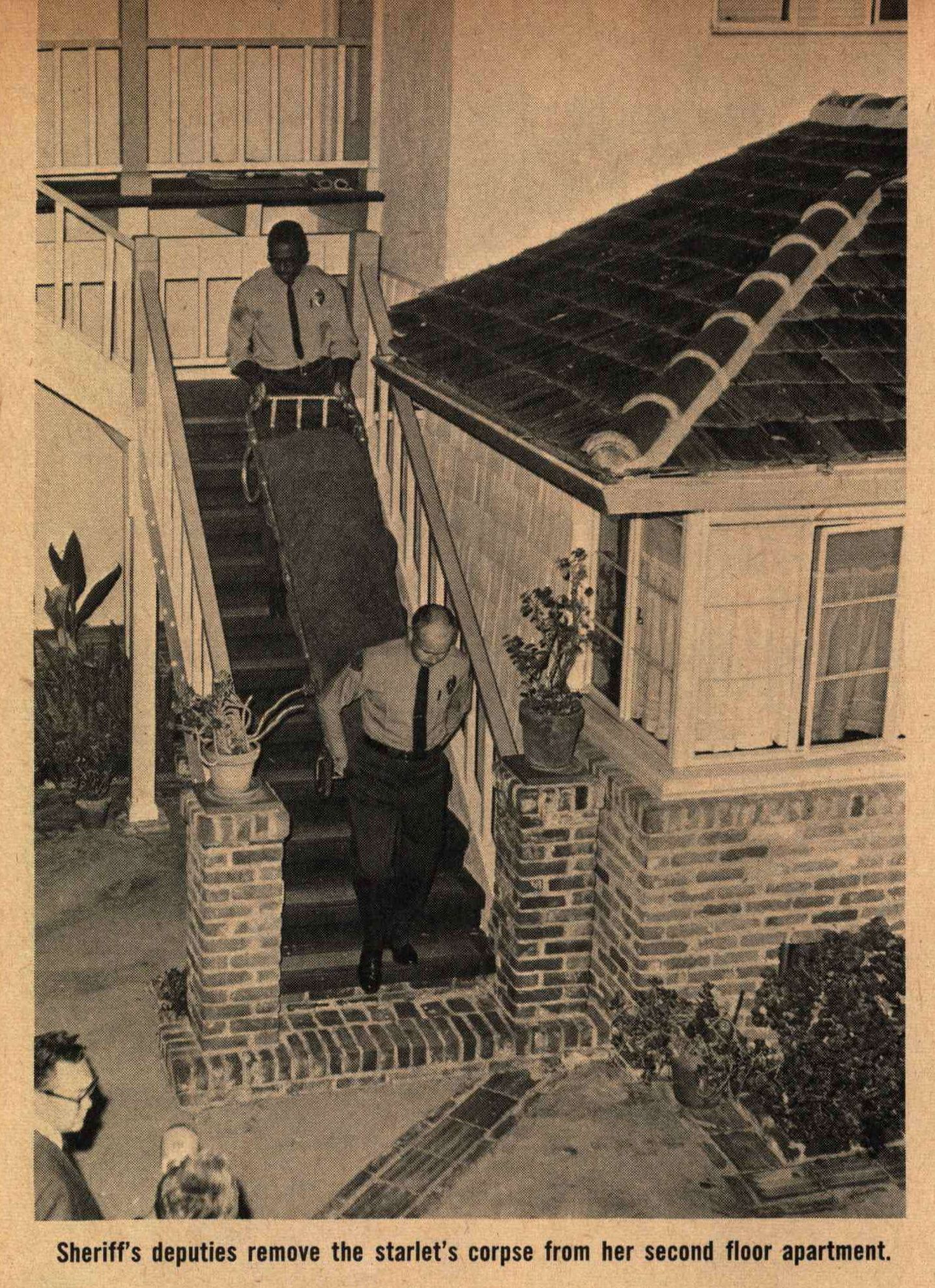
The body of Karyn Kupcinet being taken away by the L.A. County Coroner.

==== Alleged connection to JFK ====
Kupcinet’s death was first referenced in connection with the assassination of John F. Kennedy in 1967 by Penn Jones Jr. in his self-published book Forgive My Grief II. Jones cited an Associated Press report concerning an unidentified woman who placed a telephone call in or near Oxnard, California approximately twenty minutes before the assassination. Jones alleged that the caller was Kupcinet. He claimed she had been attempting to warn a local telephone operator of the impending shooting after learning about it in advance. According to the Associated Press, the woman could not be identified. According to Penn Jones, Irv Kupcinet had purportedly received information about a plan to assassinate the president from Jack Ruby, whom Jones speculated may have known Irv in Chicago in the 1940s. Jones theorized that Karyn Kupcinet was killed by individuals associated with the American Mafia as a warning to her father to remain silent about why Kennedy and his accused assassin Lee Harvey Oswald had been killed.

Irv Kupcinet denied that either he or his daughter had foreknowledge of the shootings of Kennedy or Oswald. Friends who were with Karyn in Palm Springs, California on November 22, 23 and 24, 1963, including Andrew Prine and Earl Holliman, reported that she reacted to news coverage with shock and grief and that she did not indicate prior knowledge of the events or previous familiarity with Jack Ruby.

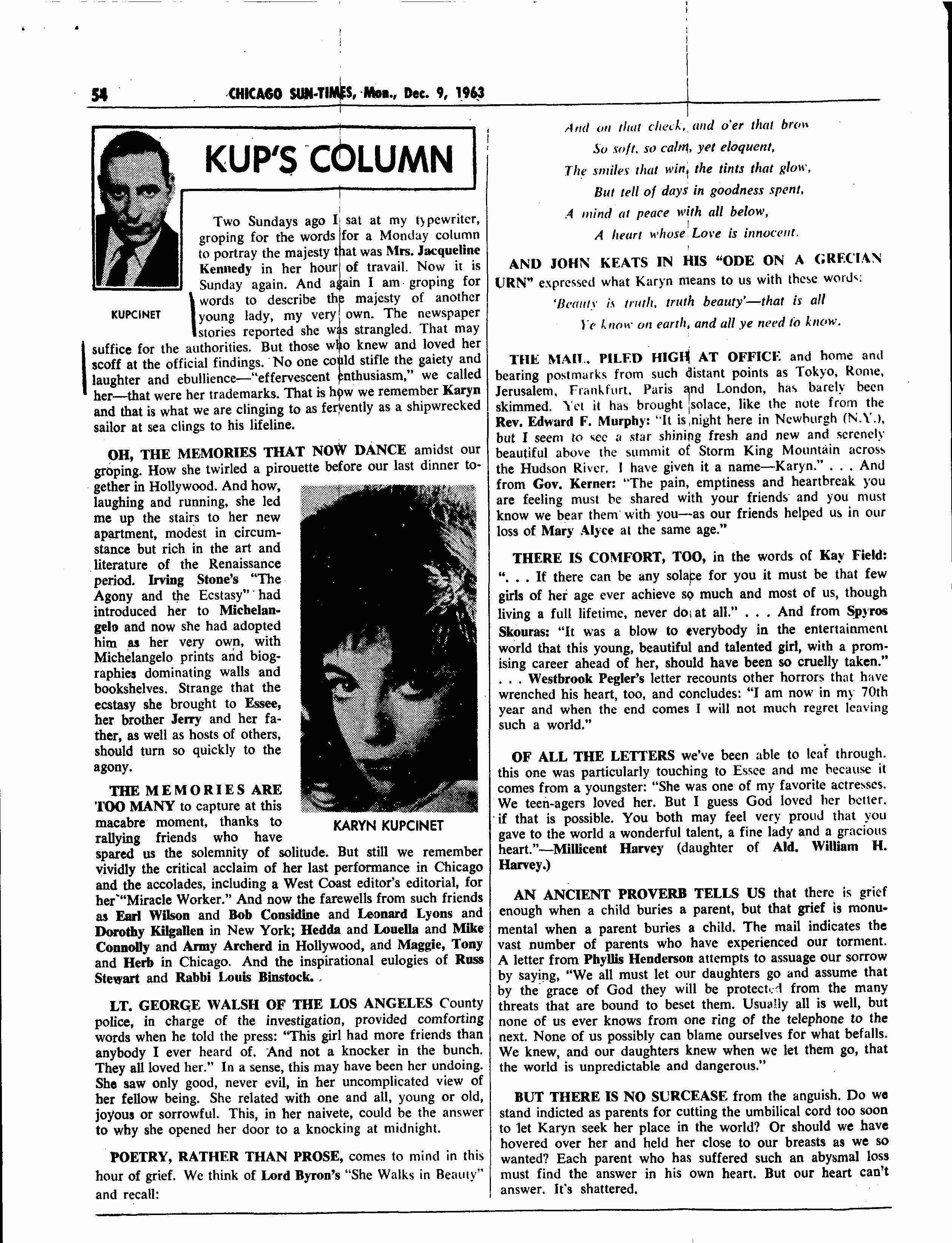
'Kups Column' Chicago Sun-Times, Monday., Dec. 9, 1963.Clipping sent by Irv Kupcinet to J. Edgar Hoover in 1963.

In 2013, the Ventura County Star published an article marking the 50th anniversary of the assassination that discussed the unidentified caller referenced by Jones. For the Ventura County Star, the story was local, as employees of GTE, a telephone service provider, had been able, in 1963, to narrow down the origin of the phone call to Oxnard. Citing Federal Bureau of Investigation records declassified years after the assassination, the article reported that two GTE telephone operators who heard the call told the FBI the caller’s voice did not match Kupcinet’s in age or tone, and that they believed the caller may have been "mentally disturbed". Also, her rambling monologue did not focus much on the president. She claimed that the United States government was going to be overthrown, and that Kennedy was one of many federal officials who would be removed from their jobs in a variety of ways.

The Warren Commission found no evidence that Irv Kupcinet had contact with Jack Ruby prior to November 1963 or that he had advance knowledge of Oswald’s death. Although Irv Kupcinet was socially acquainted with several prominent Chicago Outfit figures, including Sam Giancana and Tony Accardo, he rejected claims linking his associates to his daughter’s death. Following her death, Kupcinet sought the assistance of attorney and Mafia fixer Sidney Korshak to secure the release of his daughter’s remains. These associations later contributed to continued public speculation, which Kupcinet consistently disputed.

Irv Kupcinet received a letter of condolence from Rose Kennedy following his daughter’s death.

No official investigation has established a connection between the Kennedy assassination and the death of Karyn Kupcinet.

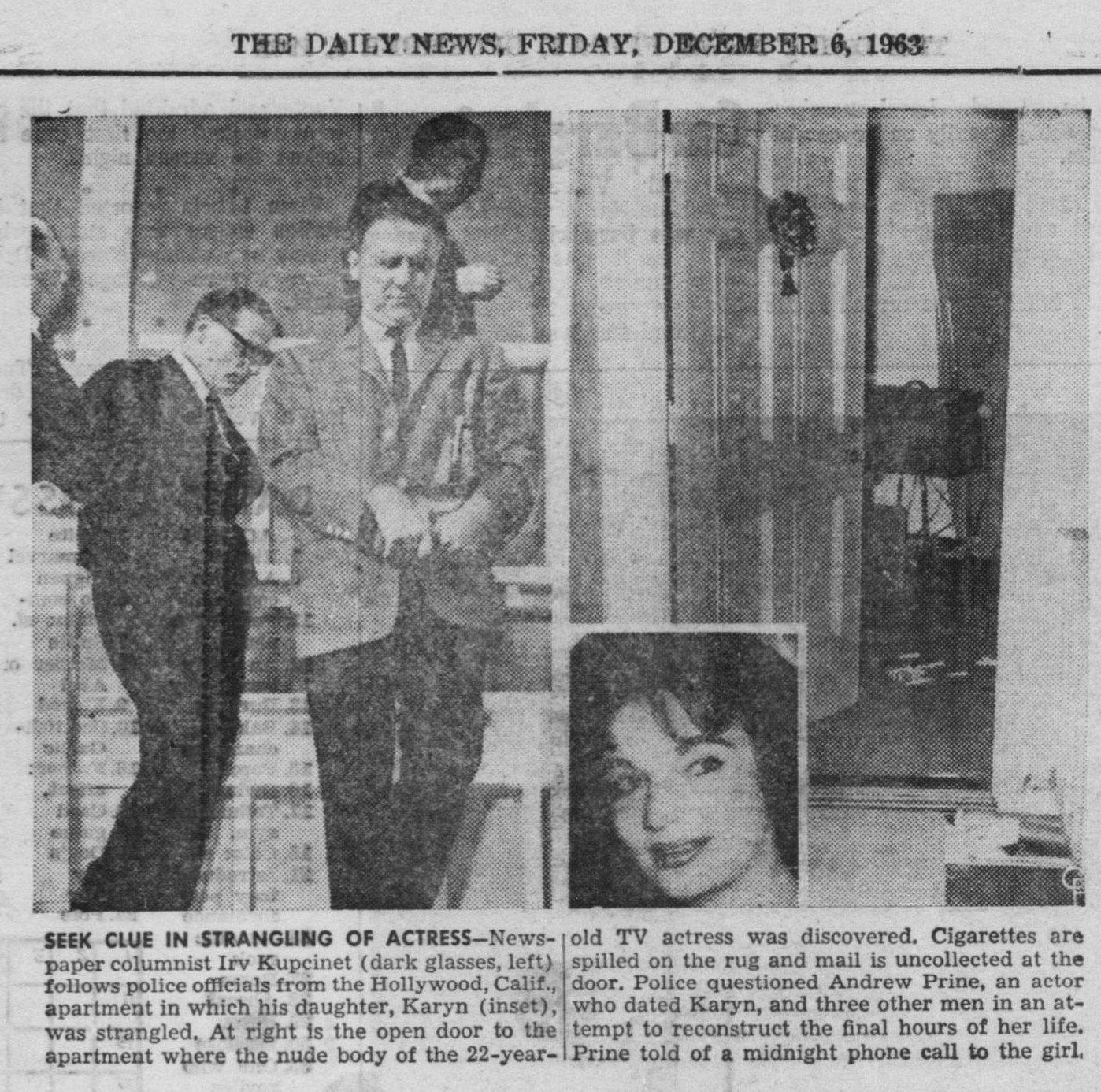
Irv Kupcinet visits the scene of his daughter's death, 1963.

=== Media attention ===
In the early 1990s, during renewed public interest in the Kennedy assassination around the release of the film JFK, Irv Kupcinet publicly criticized conspiracy theories related to the assassination. When Today on NBC aired a segment listing individuals who died violently in 1963 and were speculated to have possible links to the assassination, the program included Karyn Kupcinet's name. In his February 9, 1992 Chicago Sun-Times column, Irv Kupcinet objected to the reference, stating that there was no evidence connecting his daughter’s death to the events in Dallas and characterizing the suggestion as unfounded.

In 1999, the television program E! True Hollywood Story aired an episode titled "Death of a Dream: Karyn Kupcinet", which profiled her life and discussed theories surrounding her death.

== Legacy ==
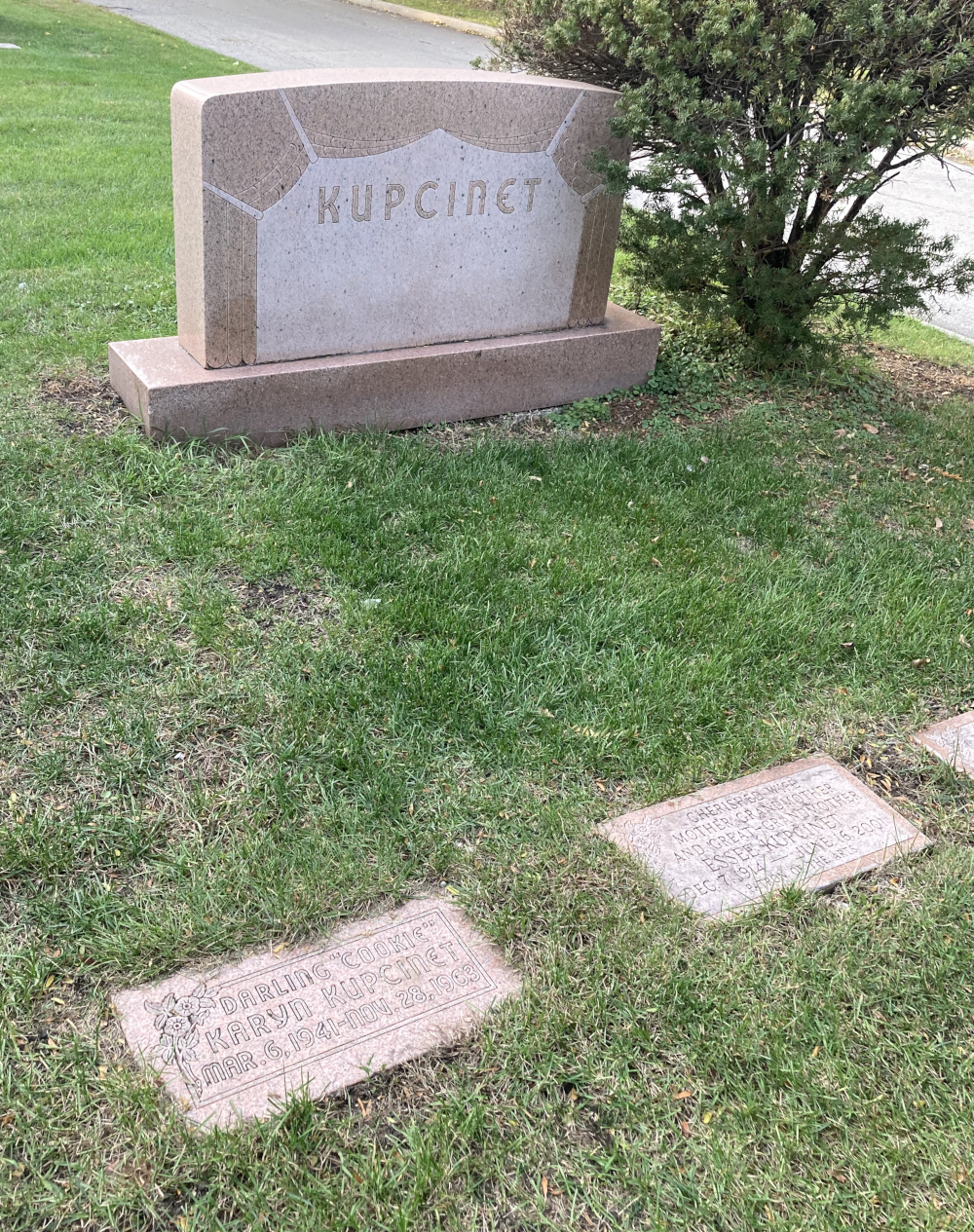
Kupcinet's grave at Memorial Park Cemetery in Skokie, Illinois

Irv and Essee Kupcinet established a playhouse at Shimer College in memory of their daughter. In 1971, they also founded the Karyn Kupcinet International School for Science, a summer research internship program, at the Weizmann Institute of Science.

In 2007, Kupcinet’s niece, actress Kari Kupcinet-Kriser, and Washburn University professor Paul Fecteau began work on a book about her death and personal writings. The project was later abandoned.

== Filmography ==
Year	Title	Role	Notes
1960 to 1961	Hawaiian Eye	Maila; Terry Crane	2 episodes
1961	The Donna Reed Show	Jeannie	Episode: "Mary's Little Lambs"
1961	The Ladies Man	Working Girl	
1961 to 1962	The Gertrude Berg Show	Carol	3 episodes
1962	The Red Skelton Show	Janet - Secretary	Episode: "How to Fail..."
1962	G.E. True	Marybelle	Episode: "The Handmade Private"
1963	The Wide Country	Barbara Rice	Episode: "A Cry from the Mountain"
1963	Going My Way	Amy	Episode: "Has Anyone Seen Eddie?"
1964	Perry Mason	Penny Ames	Episode: "The Case of the Capering Camera"

== See also ==
- List of unsolved murders (1900–1979)
