= Midnight (1939 film) =

1939 film by Mitchell Leisen

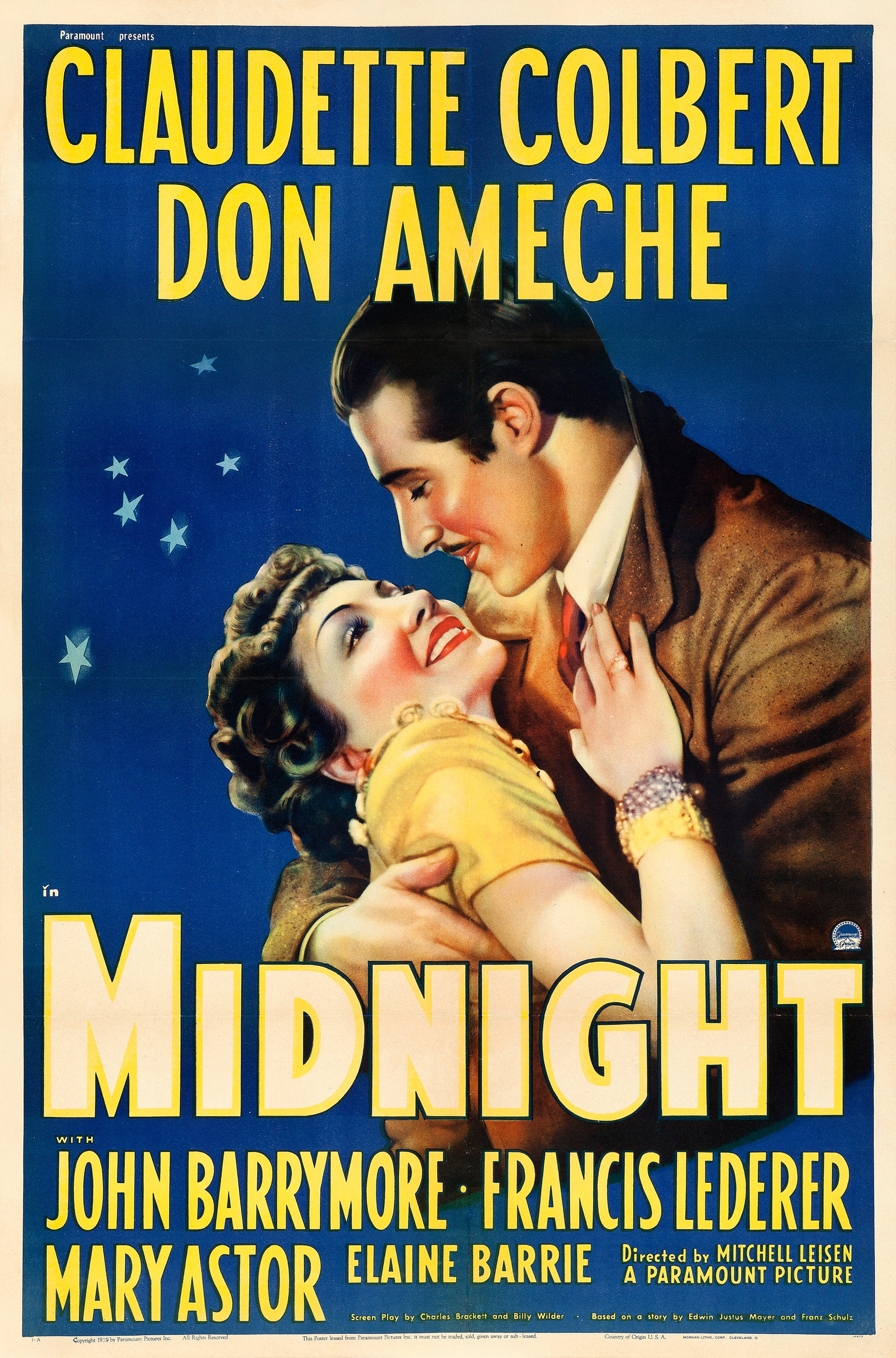
- Theatrical release poster
- Directed by: Mitchell Leisen
- Screenplay by: Charles Brackett; Billy Wilder
- Story by: Edwin Justus Mayer; Franz Schulz
- Produced by: Arthur Hornblow Jr.
- Starring: Claudette Colbert; Don Ameche; John Barrymore; Francis Lederer; Mary Astor; Elaine Barrie
- Cinematography: Charles Lang
- Edited by: Doane Harrison
- Music by: Frederick Hollander
- Production company: Paramount Pictures
- Distributed by: Paramount Pictures
- Release dates: March 16, 1939 (Denver); March 17, 1939 (Chicago); March 24, 1939 (United States)
- Running time: 94 minutes
- Country: United States
- Language: English

Midnight is a 1939 American screwball comedy film directed by Mitchell Leisen and starring Claudette Colbert, Don Ameche, John Barrymore, Francis Lederer, Mary Astor, and Elaine Barrie. Written by Charles Brackett and Billy Wilder and based on a story by Edwin Justus Mayer and Franz Schulz, the film is about an unemployed American showgirl stranded in Paris who is set up by a millionaire to break up his wife's affair with another man.

In 2013, the film was selected by the Library of Congress for preservation in the United States National Film Registry, a distinction for "culturally, historically, or aesthetically significant" films.

== Plot ==
American showgirl Eve Peabody arrives in Paris from Monte Carlo during a rainstorm with nothing but her evening gown. With no money and no place to stay, she persuades soft-hearted Hungarian taxi driver Tibor Czerny to drive her to nightclubs looking for a job in exchange for her doubling his fare. After an unsuccessful search, Tibor buys her dinner and offers to let her stay overnight at his apartment while he finishes his night shift. While attracted to Tibor, she slips away.

Seeking shelter from the rain, Eve sneaks into a black tie classical concert. Without an admission card, she uses the pawn ticket for her suitcase. Stephanie, the hostess, learns that an imposter got in using a pawn ticket, and interrupts the concert to ask if "Eve Peabody" is there. Eve tries to slip away, but is intercepted by Marcel Renaud, who invites her to play bridge in another room. The other players are Madame Helene Flammarion and Jacques Picot, a wealthy ladies' man. Eve introduces herself as "Madame Czerny" and is partnered with Jacques.

Helene's husband, Georges, enters the room and notices the woman who left during the search for the gatecrasher. Pretending to recognize Eve as the wife of "Baron Czerny", he chats with her. When the game ends, Eve and Jacques owe their opponents a few thousand francs. Eve thinks she must try to pass an IOU, but discovers 10,000 francs in her purse. Jacques insists on escorting her back to the Ritz, where she claims she is staying. Eve is stunned to find a lavish suite reserved for her.

Meanwhile, Tibor searches for her. He recruits his fellow taxi drivers by organizing a pool, where everyone puts in five francs and whoever finds Eve wins the money.

The next morning, Eve awakens to find that "her" luggage has arrived: a set of expensive trunks containing a complete wardrobe. Her car and chauffeur are waiting outside. Eve is mystified and frightened until Georges arrives, her mysterious benefactor. He explains that Helene and Jacques think they are in love. Last night, he noticed that Jacques had eyes only for the "Baroness". George proposes that Eve encourage Jacques and break up his affair with Helene. Georges will pay her well if she succeeds, and Jacques might even marry her. He gives her an expense account of fifty thousand francs and invites her to the Flammarion estate in Versailles for a weekend house party.

Jacques becomes thoroughly captivated by Eve. While driving to the party, the couple are spotted by one of the taxi drivers. He collects the prize money from Tibor, who cannot believe she is staying at the Ritz under his name. Meanwhile, Helene learns that Stefanie accused the wrong person of being the gatecrasher. Suspecting the "Baroness", Helene has Marcel retrieve Eve's suitcase.

At the Flammarion estate, Eve and Jacques arrive together, much to Helene's jealousy. When Marcel arrives with the suitcase, they search its contents and find a photograph of some showgirls, one of whom looks like the "Baroness". Helene is about to expose Eve when "Baron Tibor Czerny" is announced. Tibor informs the hosts that he has come to be with his "wife". Later in private, Tibor professes his love for Eve, who hints that she feels the same way, but she is still determined to marry for money.

The next morning, Eve suspects that Tibor is about to reveal his true identity, so she explains that the Czerny barons are prone to fits of delusional madness, a story confirmed by Georges. Tibor appears as a taxi driver, but the Flammarions simply humor him, and he walks away in anger. Jacques offers to help Eve get a divorce and then marry her.

Eve appears in court for a sham divorce. Although Tibor is angry with her, he accepts payment from Georges to go along. During the proceedings, however, Tibor pretends to be insane, knowing that this will prevent a divorce under French law. Finally cured of her infatuation, Helene leaves arm-in-arm with Georges, while Tibor and Eve head to the marriage bureau—much to the surprise of the judge who just denied their divorce.

== Cast ==
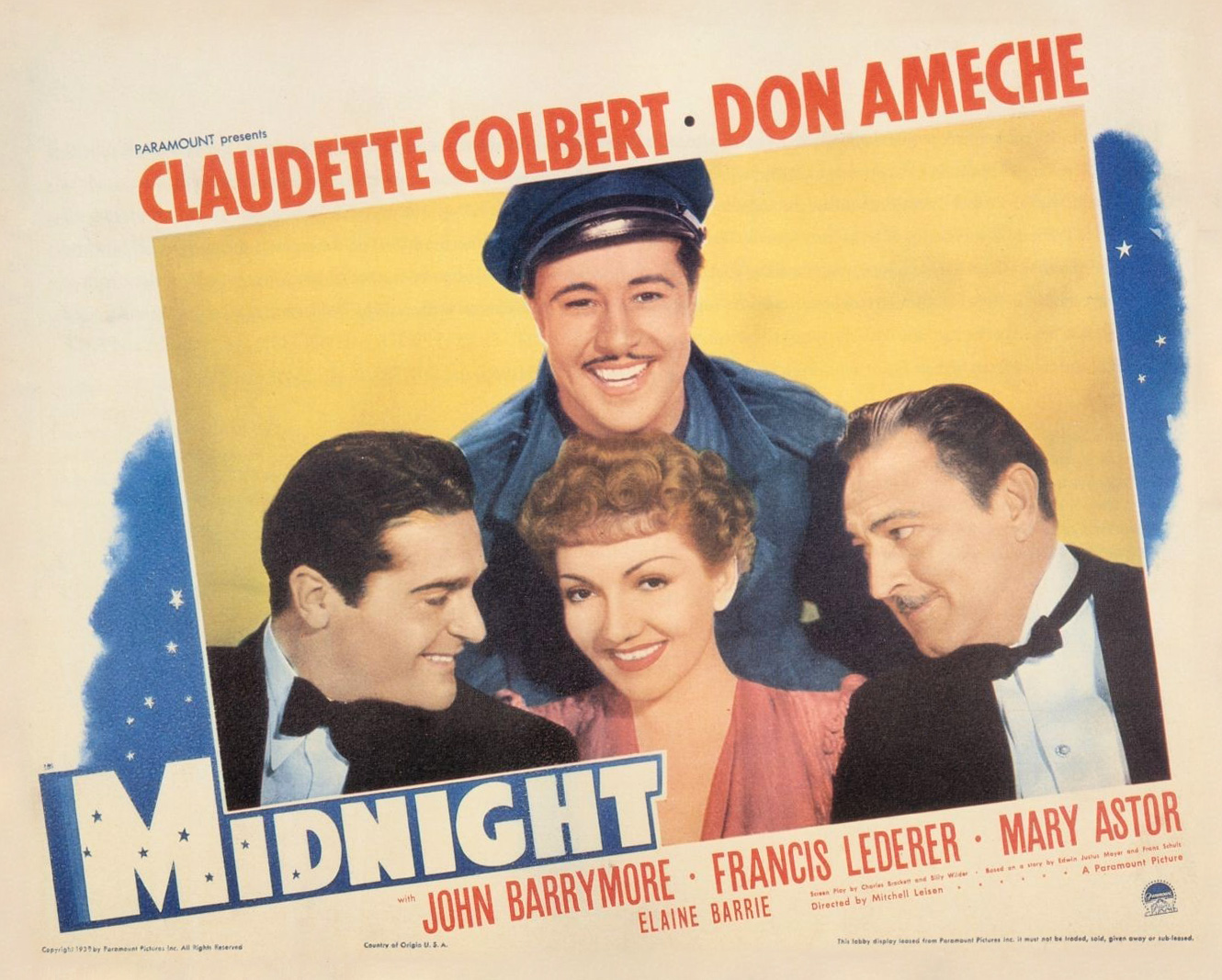
Theatrical lobby card

- Claudette Colbert as Eve Peabody
- Don Ameche as Tibor Czerny
- John Barrymore as Georges Flammarion
- Francis Lederer as Jacques Picot
- Mary Astor as Helene Flammarion
- Elaine Barrie as Simone
- Hedda Hopper as Stephanie
- Rex O'Malley as Marcel Renaud
- Monty Woolley as The Judge
- Armand Kaliz as Lebon

Uncredited cast members include:

- Lionel Pape as Edouart
- Ferdinand Munier as Stephanie's Majordomo
- DeWolf Hopper as the party's guest
- Gino Corrado as the taxi driver
- Nestor Paiva as the woman's escort
- Elspeth Dudgeon as the party's guest with dog

== Production ==
According to a Turner Classic Movies introduction by Robert Osborne, Wilder was unhappy with script changes made by director Leisen, giving him motivation to become a director himself so he would have more creative control.

The role that eventually went to Claudette Colbert was originally offered to Carole Lombard, who turned it down because she felt it was too similar to films she had already made. Barbara Stanwyck was then offered the role but scheduling problems prevented her from taking it. Marlene Dietrich was announced until Paramount bought out her contract due to her inclusion on the Box Office Poison list.

== Release ==
The film's world premiere occurred at Denver, Colorado on March 16, 1939, followed by the Chicago premiere on March 17, 1939. The film's general release in the United States was opened nationwide on March 24, 1939.

=== Home media ===
A VHS videotape was released on March 28, 1995 followed by a region 1 DVD released on April 22, 2008. The Criterion Collection released the film in 4K resolution on Blu-ray for the first time on June 17, 2025.

== Reception ==
=== Contemporary ===
Frank Nugent of The New York Times praised the film, noting: "Most of the credit, of course, belongs to Miss Colbert. She has superb command of the comic style, can turn a line or toss a vase with equal precision. Mr. Barrymore, the Gehrig of eye-brow batting, rolls his phrases with his usual richly humorous effect, and Mr. Ameche and Mr. Lederer were quite as helpful. All of them have made it a happy occasion. Pictures like Midnight should strike more often."

Herbert L. Lawson of The Oregonian described the film favorably, writing, "Here, indeed, is summer-time screen material. It is gay, sophisticated in spots and altogether delightful." The Houston Post's Jay Rose described the film's performances as "on a high level," and praised its climax as "highly amusing." The Harrisburg Telegraph similarly praised the acting, and described the film as "fastly-paced, witty and thoroughly enjoyable."

=== Modern assessment ===
Leonard Maltin gave the film three and a half of four stars: " ... chic Parisian marital mixup; near-classic comedy ... Barrymore's antics are especially memorable." Leslie Halliwell gave it three of four stars: "Sparkling sophisticated comedy which barely flags until a slightly disappointing ending: all the talents involved are in excellent form." Pauline Kael described the film as "rapturous fun ... This romantic comedy ... is one of the authentic delights of the 30s."

Writing on the film for the University at Albany, SUNY, Kevin Hagopian notes the film's emphasis on glamour, costuming, and sets:

Midnight bears Leisen's stamps in a way his colleagues in Hollywood must surely have noticed at the film's premiere. The womens' costumes and the film's interior sets, though credited to others, are the typically extravagant yet inventive designs of a Leisen film. Leisen was instrumental in creating the eclectic aesthetic that made the society comedies of Hollywood's Golden Age seem as if they were happening in a scented, sexy Utopia. Whether it's the gilded sunroom of an expatriate heiress' chalet, or a surreal millinery shop, Leisen makes all his spaces both impossible and inviting, and fills them with women gowned as if for a coming-out party in Heaven.

== Remakes ==
The film was remade as Masquerade in Mexico (1945) with Dorothy Lamour and directed by the same director, Mitchell Leisen.

In 2007, Universal Studios announced plans for a remake of Midnight to be shot in 2010, with Michael Arndt as writer and Reese Witherspoon in the lead role. As of 2025 and beyond, Universal owns the rights to the original film.

== Sources ==
- Chierichetti, David (1995). Mitchell Leisen: Hollywood Director. Los Angeles, California: Photoventures Press. ISBN 978-0-929-33004-4.
- Halliwell, Leslie (1996). Halliwell's Film Guide. New York City, New York: Grafton Books. ISBN 978-0-062-71601-9.
- Kael, Pauline (2011) [1991]. 5001 Nights at the Movies. New York City, New York: Henry Holt. ISBN 978-1-250-03357-4.
- Maltin, Leonard (2010). Leonard Maltin's Classic Movie Guide: From the Silent Era Through 1965. New York City, New York: Penguin Books. ISBN 978-0-14-751682-4.
