= Affair in Reno =

1957 film by R. G. Springsteen

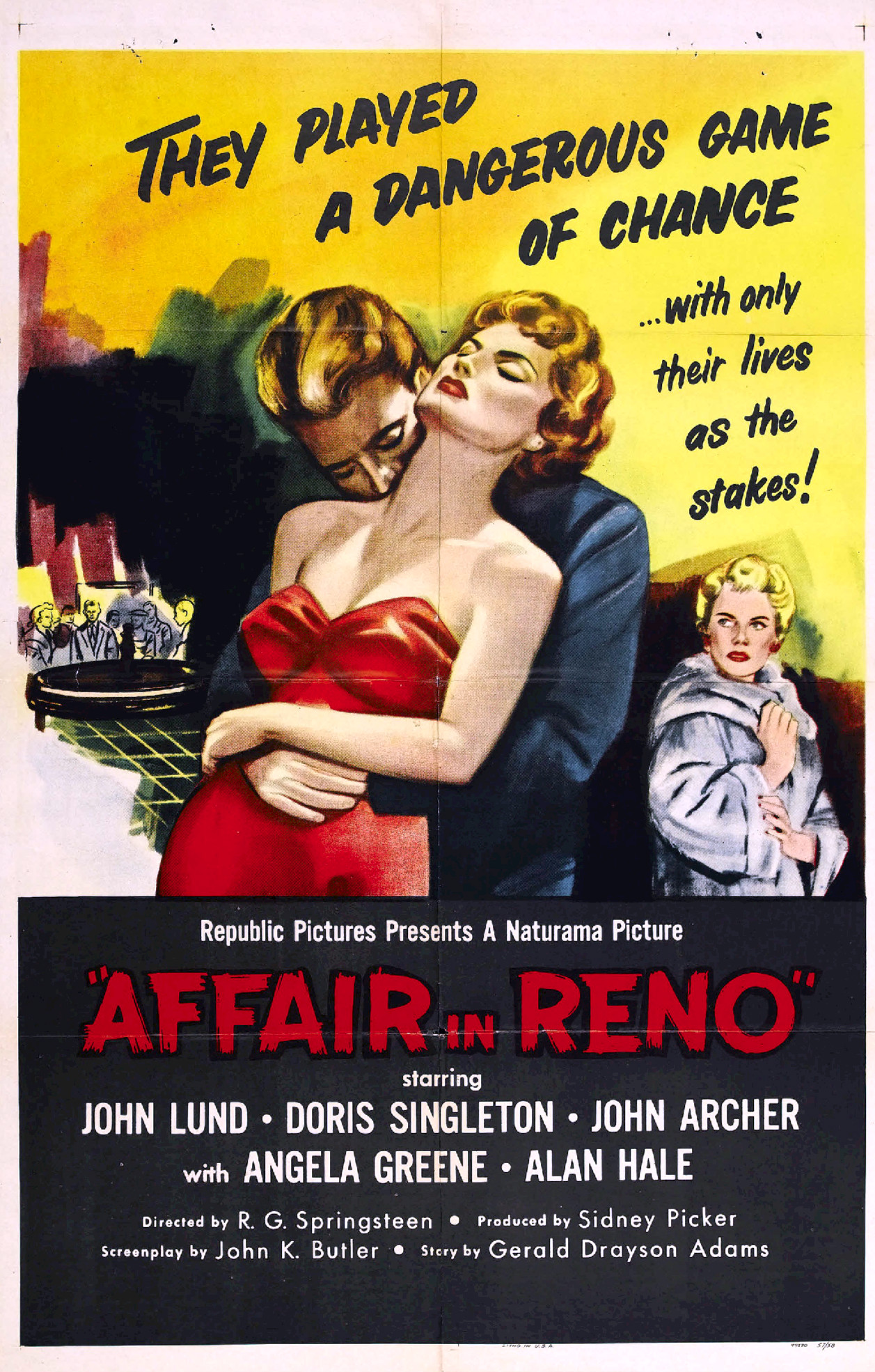
- Theatrical release poster
- Directed by: R. G. Springsteen
- Screenplay by: John K. Butler
- Story by: Gerald Drayson Adams
- Produced by: Sidney Picker
- Starring: John Lund; Doris Singleton; John Archer; Angela Greene; Alan Hale
- Cinematography: Jack Marta
- Edited by: Tony Martinelli
- Music by: R. Dale Butts
- Production company: Republic Pictures
- Distributed by: Republic Pictures
- Release date: February 15, 1957
- Running time: 75 minutes
- Country: United States
- Language: English

Affair in Reno is a 1957 American comedic crime adventure film directed by R. G. Springsteen from a screenplay by John K. Butler. The film stars John Lund, Doris Singleton, John Archer, Angela Greene and Alan Hale. The film was released on February 15, 1957, by Republic Pictures.

== Plot ==
During a flight to Reno, Bill Carter asks a stewardess for needle and thread, goes into the bathroom and inserts bundles of cash into the lining of his jacket. Upon landing, he calls for a taxi but is approached by Deke who says he's from The Reno Record and wants to get his view about the affair surrounding Gloria Del Monte, the daughter of Carter's employer, millionaire businessman J.B. Del Monte. Carter denies any knowledge, but Deke gets into the taxi with him and continues to talk about Gloria's impending divorce from husband number two and possible future marriage.

Carter continues to provide jocular replies, but Deke points a gun and, while his cabdriver partner Pete listens, tells Carter to hand over the hundred thousand dollars in cash that he is carrying. Carter struggles with the two men and throws the briefcase, breaking a window, thus triggering an alarm and causing the men to hurry into the cab and drive off.

In his hotel room, Carter receives a long-distance call from New York. It is J.B. Del Monte who tells him that, as his public relations man, Carter is expected to contact Del Monte's daughter. When Carter mentions the attempted robbery, Del Monte says that he will phone a private detective agency and have them send a bodyguard to protect Carter.

In the morning, the bodyguard arrives and turns out to be a self-assured young woman, Nora Ballard. She already knows all the details and tells Carter that anybody about to tangle with the man Gloria intends to marry, professional gambler and casino owner Tony Lamarr, ought to call out the National Guard. Carter tells her that he plans to visit H.L. Denham, the lawyer handling Gloria's divorce.

Denham tells Carter that he will phone Gloria and ask to contact Carter at his hotel. As Carter waits for the elevator, Deke and a henchman named Dave accost him and take his briefcase. When the elevator doors open, the operator turns out to be Nora Ballard and, when the two thugs lead Carter towards their car, Ballard runs out after them on the pretense of recognizing Carter as old acquaintance and calls out to a police officer asking for a lunch recommendation. The officer approaches and the thugs turn for a hasty retreat to their car while Bill retrieves his briefcase by pulling from under Deke's arm. As Ballard and Carter start walking, she informs him that Denham is actually Lamarr's attorney and that the obvious place to find Gloria would be at Lamarr's casino.

At the casino, a drunk named James T. James from Omaha approaches their table, drinks from Carter's glass and collapses. Ballard tells Carter that the Mickey Finn was intended for him and, as Lamarr enters with Gloria, follows her to the ladies lounge where she introduces herself as Nora Wellington, one of the staff writers for women's fashion magazine Today's Star and flatters Gloria into engaging in a revealing conversation. In the meantime, as Carter puts coins into a slot machine, he is approached by Lamarr who knows all about the reason for his presence and tells Conrad Hertz, the headwaiter, to show Carter out.

Ballard follows him outside and tells him that Gloria is staying under an assumed name at the Half Moon Lodge. At the lodge, however, before Carter can explain his mission to Gloria, Lamarr walks in and tells Gloria that J.B. Del Monte offered him a bribe not to marry her and that he said no. As Gloria watches, he tells Carter and Ballard to get out but, the following morning, having been instructed by Lamarr, Gloria phones Carter at his and Ballard's two-room hotel accommodation and offers to pick him up in her car for a drive and conversation. Ballard comes out of the shower and objects, but Carter leaves and discovers that Gloria is driving him to a deserted spot outside of Reno where Deke and Pete are waiting for him. She then drives off while Deke and Pete proceed to assault Carter, tearing his jacket, discovering J.B.'s hundred thousand dollars, taking the jacket with the money and driving away.

As Carter walks dejectedly along the highway, Ballard drives up, offers him a seat in her car and reveals that she replaced the hundred thousand dollars with "Michigan bankrolls" of hundred dollar bills fronting one dollar bills for a total of one thousand. At their hotel, Lamarr is waiting and tells Carter that he intends to marry Gloria unless Carter loses J.B.'s money gambling at the casino. As Bill gambles away Gloria's father's money, Nora tells her about the scheme and Gloria goes to the casino and insists that Bill win back all the lost money. In his office, refusing to pay, Lamarr reaches for a gun, but Ballard uses judo to subdue him and collect the winnings.

As Carter, Ballard and Gloria drive away from the casino, headwaiter Hertz revives Lamarr who gets into a car with Deke and Pete and orders Deke to drive after Carter's car. Ballard advises Carter to turn onto an airport-bound difficult side road where Deke loses control and plunges the pursuing car into a shallow pond. At the airport, Gloria runs to catch her flight, leaving behind her father's money. Carter is told by a police officer that he is due a speeding ticket and Ballard informs him that she will protect the money and him. They share a kiss and drive off, unbalancing the officer who was resting his foot on their bumper while writing the ticket.

== Cast ==
- John Lund as Bill Carter
- Doris Singleton as Nora Ballard
- John Archer as Tony Lamarr
- Angela Greene as Gloria Del Monte
- Alan Hale as Deke
- Harry Bartell as Conrad Hertz
- Howard McNear as James T. James
- Richard Deacon as H.L. Denham
- Thurston Hall as J.B. Del Monte
- Billy Vincent as Pete
- Eddie Foster as Schuyler

Note: Character names are not indicated in on-screen credits.

Uncredited (in order of appearance)
Virginia Carroll	Stewardess on flight to Reno
Vera Marshe	Mrs. Romanik, passenger on flight to Reno
Arthur Walsh	Bellhop who brings luggage to Carter's and Ballard's room
Emil Sitka	Cashier at Lamarr's casino
Hanna Hertelendy	Lizzie Kendall, gambler at Lamarr's casino

This was Hall's final feature-film appearance before his death in February 1958.

== Critical response ==
Writing in AllMovie, author and critic Hal Erickson described the film as "an uneven Republic adventure" that "doesn't have much in the way of production values, but compensates for this with an emphasis on comedy, especially whenever Doris Singleton has to pose as someone she's not."
