= Mitchell Leisen =

American film director

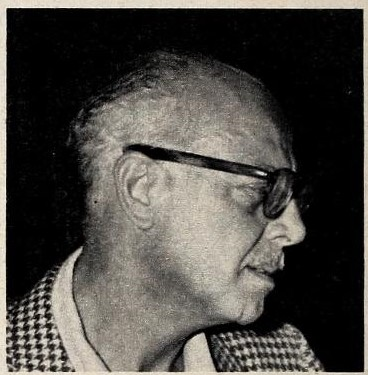
- Born: James Mitchell Leisen; October 6, 1898; Menominee, Michigan, U.S.
- Died: October 28, 1972 (aged 74); Woodland Hills, California, U.S.
- Occupations: Director, art director, costume designer, producer
- Years active: 1920–1967
- Spouse: Sandra Gahle

James Mitchell Leisen (October 6, 1898 – October 28, 1972) was an American director, art director, and costume designer.

== Film career ==
He entered the film industry in the 1920s, beginning in the art and costume departments. He directed his first film in 1933 with Cradle Song and became known for his keen sense of aesthetics in the glossy Hollywood melodramas and screwball comedies he turned out.

His best known films include Alberto Casella's adaptation of Death Takes a Holiday and Murder at the Vanities, a musical mystery story (both 1934), as well as Midnight (1939) and Hold Back the Dawn (1941), both co-scripted by Charles Brackett and Billy Wilder. Easy Living (1937), written by Preston Sturges and starring Jean Arthur, was another hit for the director, who also directed Remember the Night (1940), the last film written by Sturges before he started directing his scripts as well.

Lady in the Dark (1944), To Each His Own (1946), and No Man of Her Own (1950) were later successes. Charles Brackett's comedy The Mating Season (1951) starring Gene Tierney, Miriam Hopkins and Thelma Ritter was an updated version of Leisen's earlier screwball comedies of the 1930s, and was also his last big movie success.

When his film career ended, Leisen directed episodes of such television series as Thriller, Shirley Temple's Storybook, The Twilight Zone, and The Girl from U.N.C.L.E.. He later became a nightclub owner.

== Personal life ==
Though married, Leisen was reported to be gay or bisexual. According to Carolyn Roos, Leisen's longtime business manager's daughter, he had a very long relationship with dancer/actor/choreographer Billy Daniel until the 1950s (Daniel died in 1962). Leisen, with Daniel and dancer/actor Mary Parker, formed Hollywood Presents Inc. as a means of promoting both Daniel and Parker off-screen. Leisen died of heart disease in 1972, aged 74. His grave is located in Chapel of the Pines Crematory.

== Awards ==
He garnered his sole Academy Award nomination in 1930 for Art Direction for Cecil B. DeMille's Dynamite. He directed Hold Back the Dawn (1941), which was nominated for the Academy Award for Best Picture.

== Filmography (as director) ==
Year	Title	Production Co.	Cast	Notes
1933	Cradle Song	Paramount	Dorothea Wieck / Evelyn Venable	
1934	Bolero	Paramount	George Raft / Carole Lombard	Co-directed with Wesley Ruggles
1934	Death Takes a Holiday	Paramount	Fredric March / Evelyn Venable	Released to DVD
1934	Murder at the Vanities	Paramount	Victor McLaglen / Jack Oakie / Carl Brisson	
1934	Behold My Wife	Paramount	Gene Raymond / Ann Sheridan / Sylvia Sidney	
1935	Four Hours to Kill!	Paramount	Richard Barthelmess / Ray Milland / Gertrude Michael	
1935	Hands Across the Table	Paramount	Carole Lombard / Fred MacMurray	
1936	13 Hours by Air	Paramount	Fred MacMurray / Joan Bennett / ZaSu Pitts	
1936	The Big Broadcast of 1937	Paramount	Jack Benny / George Burns / Gracie Allen / Ray Milland	
1937	Swing High, Swing Low	Paramount	Carole Lombard / Fred MacMurray / Dorothy Lamour	Released to DVD
1937	Easy Living	Paramount	Jean Arthur / Edward Arnold / Ray Milland	Released to DVD
1938	The Big Broadcast of 1938	Paramount	W. C. Fields / Martha Raye / Bob Hope / Dorothy Lamour	Released to DVD
1938	Artists and Models Abroad	Paramount	Jack Benny / Joan Bennett	Released to DVD
1939	Midnight	Paramount	Claudette Colbert / Don Ameche / John Barrymore / Mary Astor	Released to DVD
1940	Remember the Night	Paramount	Barbara Stanwyck / Fred MacMurray	Released to DVD
1940	Arise, My Love	Paramount	Claudette Colbert / Ray Milland	
1941	I Wanted Wings	Paramount	Ray Milland / William Holden / Wayne Morris / Veronica Lake	WON Academy Award for Best Visual Effects.
1941	Hold Back the Dawn	Paramount	Charles Boyer / Olivia de Havilland / Paulette Goddard	Nominated for Academy Award for Best Picture. Released to DVD (region 2).
1942	The Lady Is Willing	Columbia	Marlene Dietrich / Fred MacMurray	
1942	Take a Letter, Darling	Paramount	Rosalind Russell / Fred MacMurray	
1943	No Time for Love	Paramount	Claudette Colbert / Fred MacMurray	
1944	Lady in the Dark	Paramount	Ginger Rogers / Ray Milland	Technicolor film
1944	Frenchman's Creek	Paramount	Joan Fontaine / Arturo de Córdova / Basil Rathbone / Nigel Bruce	Technicolor film
1944	Practically Yours	Paramount	Claudette Colbert / Fred MacMurray	
1945	Kitty	Paramount	Paulette Goddard / Ray Milland	
1945	Masquerade in Mexico	Paramount	Dorothy Lamour / Arturo de Córdova	
1946	To Each His Own	Paramount	Olivia de Havilland / John Lund	Academy Award for Best Actress. Released to VHS.
1947	Suddenly, It's Spring	Paramount	Paulette Goddard / Fred MacMurray	
1947	Golden Earrings	Paramount	Marlene Dietrich / Ray Milland	
1948	Dream Girl	Paramount	Betty Hutton / Macdonald Carey	
1949	Bride of Vengeance	Paramount	Paulette Goddard / Macdonald Carey / John Lund	
1949	Song of Surrender	Paramount	Claude Rains / Wanda Hendrix / Macdonald Carey	
1950	No Man of Her Own	Paramount	Barbara Stanwyck / John Lund	
1950	Captain Carey, U.S.A.	Paramount	Alan Ladd / Wanda Hendrix	
1951	The Mating Season	Paramount	Gene Tierney / John Lund / Miriam Hopkins / Thelma Ritter	Nominated Academy Award for Best Supporting Actress Thelma Ritter
1951	Darling, How Could You!	Paramount	Joan Fontaine / John Lund	
1952	Young Man with Ideas	MGM	Glenn Ford	
1953	Tonight We Sing	20th Century Fox	David Wayne / Ezio Pinza / Roberta Peters / Tamara Toumanova	Technicolor film
1955	Bedevilled	MGM	Anne Baxter / Steve Forrest	Co-directed with Richard Thorpe / Eastmancolor film
1958	The Girl Most Likely	RKO Radio Pictures	Jane Powell / Cliff Robertson	Technicolor film
1967	Spree	Trans American	—	Co-directed with Walon Green / documentary / color film
