= Battle Stations (film) =

1956 film

- Directed by: Lewis Seiler
- Screenplay by: Crane Wilbur
- Based on: a story by Ben Finney
- Produced by: Bryan Foy
- Starring: John Lund; William Bendix; Keefe Brasselle; Richard Boone; William Leslie
- Cinematography: Burnett Guffey, A.S.C.
- Edited by: Jerome Thoms, A.C.E.
- Music by: Mischa Bakaleinikoff (conducted by)
- Production company: Columbia Pictures
- Distributed by: Columbia Pictures Corporation
- Release date: February 1, 1956
- Running time: 81 minutes
- Country: United States
- Language: English

Battle Stations is a 1956 American war film directed by Lewis Seiler and starring John Lund, William Bendix and Keefe Brasselle. It was produced and distributed by Columbia Pictures. It took inspiration from the 1944 documentary film The Fighting Lady.

== Plot ==
In Act I a Catholic priest, Father Joseph McIntyre (Lund) who is serving in the US Navy is stationed on an aircraft carrier. He is shown around the ship by seasoned Chief Boatswain Mate, Buck Fitzpatrick (Bendix). The crew of the ship receives the order to sail and there is widespread dissatisfaction with the short notice given, but Fitzpatrick establishes order through his commanding presence; however, his soft side is shown when he helps one of the younger crew members to keep a small dog that he had brought onto the ship.

Act II begins with the ship at sea and the crew is undergoing intense training at their various stations. The officers drill the crew constantly preparing them for future battles against an enemy that would often rather die than surrender. Father McIntyre establishes himself as a friendly presence among the crew and begins to gain their trust. The Captain (Boone) explains to McIntyre that the ship had previously been attacked by the Japanese and had been thought by them to be sunk and lost. The ship eventually rendezvous with a large task force assembling for battle.

Act III finds the Task Force under attack, first by an enemy submarine that is quickly dispatched, but then the attacks intensify. The carrier is eventually hit and damage control teams struggle throughout the night to put out raging fires. Some of the crew has become trapped below decks and only the training and familiarity with the ship prevents them from becoming lost in the smoky darkness. Morning finds the ship still burning and listing badly. The ship and crew limp back to their forward base and then they are ordered to take the ship back to the mainland for repairs but they have sustained many casualties. They return to base with an honor guard and a military band playing 'Anchors Aweigh.'

== Cast ==
- John Lund as Father Joseph McIntyre
- William Bendix as Buck Fitzpatrick
- Keefe Brasselle as Chris Jordan
- Richard Boone as The captain
- William Leslie as Ensign Pete Kelly
- John Craven as Cmdr. James Matthews
- James Lydon as Squawk Hewitt
- Claude Akins as Marty Brennan
- George O'Hanlon as Patrick Mosher
- Eddie Foy, III as Tom Short

=== Uncredited ===
- James O'Hara as Williams
- Robert Stevenson as John Moody
- Jon Locke as Wallakowski
- Carleton Young as Rear Admiral

== Critical response ==
Writing in AllMovie, author and film critic Hal Erickson described the film as "a standard wartime melodrama with the usual assortment of cliches," noting that "the economies in Battle Stations extend to its opening-credit music, which has been lifted bodily from Max Steiner's score for The Caine Mutiny." Film review site The Movie Scene described the film as having "that same sense of patriotism and propaganda about it which those movies made during WWII had," that "it feels like who ever wrote it had watched dozens of other movies about life at sea during the war, picked out all the bits which they liked right down [to] the music and then slotted them together," and that it "delivers plenty of cliche."

== Bibliography ==
- Fetrow, Alan G. Feature Films, 1950-1959: A United States Filmography. McFarland, 1999.
- Paris, Michael. From the Wright Brothers to Top Gun: Aviation, Nationalism, and Popular Cinema. Manchester University Press, 1995.
