= Darling, How Could You! =

1951 film by Mitchell Leisen

- Directed by: Mitchell Leisen
- Written by: Dodie Smith; Lesser Samuels
- Based on: Alice Sit-by-the-Fire by J. M. Barrie
- Produced by: Harry Tugend
- Starring: Joan Fontaine; John Lund; Mona Freeman
- Cinematography: Daniel L. Fapp
- Edited by: Alma Macrorie; Eda Warren
- Music by: Friedrich Hollaender
- Production company: Paramount Pictures
- Distributed by: Paramount Pictures
- Release dates: October 4, 1950 (Los Angeles); November 8, 1950 (New York)
- Running time: 96 minutes
- Country: United States
- Language: English

Darling, How Could You! theatrical trailer

Darling, How Could You! is a 1951 American period comedy film directed by Mitchell Leisen and starring Joan Fontaine, John Lund and Mona Freeman. The script is based on the 1905 J. M. Barrie play Alice Sit-by-the-Fire. The film was produced and distributed by Paramount Pictures.

== Plot ==
In late 1906, brother and sister Cosmo and Amy Grey have not seen their parents for many years. Their father is a doctor who has been in Panama during the construction of the Panama Canal. Their housekeeper sends them to see the play Peter Pan, they mistakenly see a rather sophisticated family melodrama instead.

Robert and Alice Grey return home, but their children hardly know them. Baby Molly has formed a natural attachment to her nanny, and both are reluctant to have Alice take the nanny's place. The three children warm to Robert, but Alice receives a cold welcome. Furthermore, seeing the play has given Amy some peculiar ideas of how adults behave. When she hears Alice receive an invitation to meet family friend Dr. Steve Clark, she falsely assumes that they are having a romantic tryst.

Amy arrives at Steve's unexpectedly, trying to persuade him to end the nonexistent affair, but he is confused. She hides in a closet when her parents arrive, but when a glove is found and Amy's presence is revealed, everyone has the wrong idea of what has happened. Alice now assumes that the doctor is involved with her daughter while Robert assumes that the doctor and his wife are having an affair.

Eventually, Alice discovers why Amy believed that she has been having an affair. She follows the plot of the play and pretends to end the affair with Steve in a dramatic fashion, and this helps win Amy and the other children to her side. She explains everything to Robert, who is amused, and the contented family sits by the fire.

== Cast ==
- Joan Fontaine as Mrs. Alice Grey
- John Lund as Dr. Robert Grey
- Mona Freeman as Amy Grey
- Peter Hansen as Dr. Steve Clark
- David Stollery as Cosmo Grey
- Virginia Farmer as Fanny
- Angela Clarke as Nurse
- Lowell Gilmore as Aubrey Quayne
- Robert Barrat as Mr. Rossiter
- Gertrude Michael as Mrs. Rossiter
- Mary Murphy as Sylvia
- Frank Elliott as Simms
- Billie Bird as Rosie
- Willard Waterman as Theatre Manager

== Reception ==
In a contemporary review for The New York Times, critic Howard Thompson called the film "feeble, sticky and laboriously arch" and a "lusterless flapdoodle." Thompson wrote: "Ragged sentimentality and hackneyed misunderstanding march hand in hand through this tritely presented tale of parlor embarrassment. ... Paramount, how could you!"

Critic Edwin Schallert of the Los Angeles Times wrote: "It is a domestic type comedy, almost fragmentary in plot and idea, exceptionally charming. The laughs that it offers are bright and decidedly for general family appreciation. It will probably enjoy its greatest appeal with the feminine audience. ... 'Darling, How Could You!' will unfortunately probably cause no great reverberations as an attraction in the present film situation. Actually it might have been shown to greater advantage in an art theater. It is delightful enough to have a very special attraction for select audiences."
