= Latin Lovers (1953 film) =

1953 film by Mervyn LeRoy

- Theatrical release poster
- Directed by: Mervyn LeRoy
- Written by: Isobel Lennart
- Produced by: Joe Pasternak
- Starring: Lana Turner; Ricardo Montalbán; John Lund; Louis Calhern
- Cinematography: Joseph Ruttenberg
- Edited by: John McSweeney Jr.
- Music by: Nicholas Brodszky
- Color process: Technicolor
- Distributed by: Metro-Goldwyn-Mayer
- Release date: August 25, 1953
- Running time: 104 min
- Country: United States
- Language: English
- Budget: $1,769,000
- Box office: $2,089,000

Latin Lovers is a Technicolor 1953 romantic musical comedy film made by MGM. It was directed by Mervyn LeRoy, and written by Isobel Lennart. The music score is by Nicholas Brodszky, and the cinematographer was Joseph Ruttenberg.

== Plot summary ==
Nora Taylor has a fortune worth $37 million, but fears men only want her for her money. The current man in her life is Paul Chevron, who is even wealthier than she is.

Paul delays further discussion of marriage until he returns from a trip to Brazil to play polo. After hearing that men who go to Brazil often fall for the beautiful women there, Nora decides to fly there and surprise Paul, taking along trusty secretary Anne.

It is she who meets a new romantic interest, dashing Roberto Santos, who sweeps her off her feet. Once again, though, Nora is concerned about whether it's her or her riches that attracts him, so she announces her intention to give away all her money. Roberto disagrees about that because he thinks money can make life easier, so Nora leaves him.

Having remained calm during Nora's distraction with a new man, Paul returns to the U.S. and proposes marriage to her. Nora realizes she is not in love with him and says so. Anne surprisingly declares her own love for Paul, saying when it comes to the heart, money shouldn't matter. Nora comes to her senses and returns to Roberto, saying she still intends to give all her money away, but to him.

== Cast ==
- Lana Turner as Nora Taylor
- Ricardo Montalbán as Roberto Santos (credited as Ricardo Montalban)
- John Lund as Paul Chevron
- Louis Calhern as Grandfather Eduardo Santos
- Jean Hagen as Anne Kellwood
- Eduard Franz as Dr. Lionel Y. Newman
- Beulah Bondi as Woman analyst
- Joaquin Garay as Zeca
- Archer MacDonald as Howard G. Hubbell
- Dorothy Neumann as Mrs. Newman
- Robert Burton as Mr. Cumberly
- Rita Moreno as Christina
- Gordon Richards as George, Paul's Butler
- Bess Flowers as Engagement Party Guest
- Pat Flaherty as Jim Webson - Polo Player

== Notes ==
Fernando Lamas was originally cast in the role that Ricardo Montalbán played. Lamas and Lana Turner were lovers and when they broke up, she insisted he be replaced.

== Reception ==
According to MGM records the film earned $1,056,000 in the US and Canada and $1,033,000 elsewhere, resulting in a profit of $320,000. Film critic of the time, Pauline Kael, said of the film that it was an "incarnation of American speed and efficiency, vigor and abundance, held together by the conviction that all this is good (life)."
