= Billie Bird =

American actress and comedian (1908–2002)

- Born: February 28, 1908; Pocatello, Idaho, U.S.
- Died: November 27, 2002 (aged 94); Granada Hills, California, U.S.
- Resting place: Forest Lawn Memorial Park
- Occupations: Actress, comedian
- Years active: 1950–1997

Billie Bird Sellen (February 28, 1908 – November 27, 2002), better known professionally as Billie Bird, was an American character actress and comedian. She played Margie in Dear John (1988–1992).

== Early life ==
Born in Pocatello, Idaho, Bird was discovered at the age of eight while living at an orphanage. As a child, she worked in vaudeville, including an act with the King Sisters, and later in theater/cabaret before moving on to television and films.

== Career ==
She is credited with an appearance in a 1921 film Grass Widowers, but it is not clear if this is accurate. Otherwise, she broke into films in 1950, later making a brief, uncredited appearance in The Odd Couple as a chambermaid. Her only line was "Goodnight", which was said to Felix Ungar, who responded, "Goodbye." Bird often was cast by director John Hughes and appeared in many of his 1980 and 1990s films, such as Sixteen Candles (1984), Home Alone (1990), and Dennis the Menace (1993), the latter two of which both paired her with veteran Hughes actor Bill Erwin playing her husband. She also starred as Mrs. Lois Feldman in Police Academy 4 (1987) and Mrs. Stanwyck in Police Academy 6: City Under Siege (1989). Her last film appearance was in 1995's Jury Duty, with Pauly Shore.

In addition to films, Bird made numerous appearances on various television series, including roles on The Waltons, Eight Is Enough, Happy Days, Silver Spoons, Ironside, The Facts of Life, Who's the Boss?, Knots Landing, and The Wonder Years. She was also a regular cast member on the sitcoms It Takes Two in 1982, Benson from 1984 to 1986, and in 1988 Dear John starring Judd Hirsch. Her last acting role was a brief appearance in 1997 on an episode of the sitcom George and Leo, which starred Bob Newhart and Bird's former co-star, Hirsch.

Bird entertained troops in Vietnam with her own variety act, "Flying High With Billie Bird." For her efforts, she was one of the few women to ever be made an honorary member of the Green Berets.

== Death ==
Bird died on November 27, 2002, in Granada Hills, California, at the age of 94 after several years of Alzheimer's disease.

== Filmography ==
Film
Year	Title	Role	Notes
1950	Dallas	School Teacher	Uncredited
1951	The Mating Season	Mugsy	
1951	The Lemon Drop Kid	Racetrack Bettor on Iron Bar	Uncredited
1951	Darling, How Could You!	Rosie	
1951	Rhubarb	Mona Lizzie	Uncredited
1951	Journey into Light	Gertie	
1952	Anything Can Happen	Bus Passenger	Uncredited
1952	Just Across the Street	Pearl	
1952	My Man and I	Waitress	Uncredited
1952	Somebody Loves Me	Essie	
1952	My Wife's Best Friend	Katie	Uncredited
1953	Half a Hero	Ernestine	
1954	Woman's World	Woman in Bargain Basement	Uncredited; Alternative title: A Woman's World
1957	The Joker Is Wild	Ticket Seller / Cashier	Uncredited
1957	Panama Sal	Woman Manager	
1958	Unwed Mother	Gertie	
1959	Born to Be Loved	Drunk's wife	
1959	Blue Denim	Woman	Uncredited
1960	Too Soon to Love	Mrs. Jefferson	Alternative title: Teenage Lovers
1961	The Cat Burglar	Mrs. Prattle	
1961	Secret of Deep Harbor	Mama Miller	
1966	The Las Vegas Hillbillys	Aunt Clem	
1966	This Property Is Condemned	Party Guest	Uncredited
1967	Barefoot in the Park	Drunken neighbor	Uncredited
1968	The Odd Couple	Chambermaid	Uncredited
1970	Getting Straight	Landlady	
1972	Stand Up and Be Counted		Uncredited
1982	Young Doctors in Love	Mrs. Greschler the Flower Lady	
1983	Max Dugan Returns	Older Woman	
1984	Sixteen Candles	Dorothy Baker (Grandmother)	
1986	One Crazy Summer	Grandma	
1986	Ratboy	Psychic	
1987	Police Academy 4: Citizens on Patrol	Mrs. Lois Feldman	
1988	Ernest Saves Christmas	Mary Morrissey	
1989	That's Adequate	Old Lillian Darling	
1989	Police Academy 6: City Under Siege	Mrs. Stanwyck	
1990	The End of Innocence	Mrs. Yabledablov	
1990	Home Alone	Irene (woman in airport)	
1993	Dennis the Menace	Edith Butterwell	
1995	Jury Duty	Rose	

Television
Year	Title	Role	Notes
1958	Letter to Loretta	Mrs. Shubb	1 episode
1971	Adam-12	Winnie Goodrich	1 episode
1973	Gunsmoke	Old Woman	1 episode
1974	Apple's Way	Lillian	1 episode
1976–1977	The Waltons	Mrs. Cox; Shirley	2 episodes
1982	House Calls		1 episode
1982–1983	It Takes Two	Mama	22 episodes
1983	Goodnight, Beantown		1 episode
1984–1986	Benson	Mrs. Endicott / Rose Cassidy	Series Regular: Season 7
1984	Newhart	Ella	1 episode
1984	Happy Days	Mother Kelp (Marion Cunningham's Mother)	1 episode
1984	Three's a Crowd	Aunt Mae (Jack Tripper's Aunt)	1 episode
1985	Remington Steele	Anna Dix	1 episode
1986	Hardcastle and McCormick	Mimi LeGrand	1 episode
1986–1987	Brothers	Aunt Wilhelmina (Donald Maltby's aunt)	3 episodes
1986–1987	Silver Spoons	Mildred	2 episodes
1987	Max Headroom	Florence	1 episode
1987	Cheers	Lillian Miller	1 episode
1988–1992	Dear John	Margie Philbert	90 episodes
1988	Hunter	Marie Watson	1 episode
1992	Murphy Brown	Ruthie	1 episode
1993	The Wonder Years	Woman	2 episodes
1997	George and Leo		1 episode, (final appearance)
