= Suddenly, It's Spring =

1947 film by Mitchell Leisen

- 1947 Theatrical Poster
- Directed by: Mitchell Leisen
- Screenplay by: P. J. Wolfson; Claude Binyon
- Story by: P. J. Wolfson
- Produced by: Claude Binyon
- Starring: Paulette Goddard; Fred MacMurray; Macdonald Carey
- Cinematography: Daniel L. Fapp
- Edited by: Alma Macrorie
- Music by: Victor Young
- Production company: Paramount Pictures
- Distributed by: Paramount Pictures
- Release date: February 13, 1947
- Running time: 87 minutes
- Country: United States
- Language: English
- Box office: $2,050,000 (US rentals)

Suddenly, It's Spring is a 1947 American comedy film directed by Mitchell Leisen and starring Paulette Goddard, Fred MacMurray and Macdonald Carey. Some sources list the title without a comma. It was produced and distributed by Paramount Pictures.

== Plot ==
In 1945, at the end of World War II, married couple Mary and Peter Morley are seeing each other again after both serving in the military. When they parted, they were planning to divorce, but they never went through with it. Now reunited, they must decide if the marriage should end. Meanwhile, another woman considers herself betrothed to the husband, and a friend of the husband has romantic designs on the wife.

== Cast ==
- Paulette Goddard as Mary Morely
- Fred MacMurray as Peter Morely
- Macdonald Carey as Jack Lindsay
- Arleen Whelan as Gloria Fay
- Lillian Fontaine as Mary's Mother
- Frank Faylen as Harold Michaels
- Frances Robinson as WAC Capt. Rogers
- Victoria Horne as WAC Lt. Billings
- Georgia Backus as WAC Maj. Cheever
- Jean Ruth as WAC Cpl. Michaels
- Roberta Jonay as WAC Sergeant
- Willie Best as Porter on Train
- Isabel Withers as Reporter
- Archie Twitchell as Captain Jergens
- Stanley Blystone as Hotel Detective
- Gino Corrado as Chef
- Isabel Randolph as Dowager in Elevator
- Emory Parnell as Elevator Passenger

== Radio adaptation ==
Suddenly, It's Spring was presented on Stars in the Air February 21, 1952. The 30-minute adaptation starred Betty Hutton and Macdonald Carey.

== Bibliography ==
- Fowler, Stacy & A. Deacon Deborah. A Century in Uniform: Military Women in American Films. McFarland, 2020.
