= Steel Town (1952 film) =

1952 film by George Sherman

- Directed by: George Sherman
- Screenplay by: Gerald Drayson Adams; Lou Breslow
- Story by: Leonard Freeman
- Produced by: Leonard Goldstein (producer); Ross Hunter (associate producer)
- Starring: Ann Sheridan; John Lund; Howard Duff
- Cinematography: Charles P. Boyle
- Edited by: Ted J. Kent
- Music by: Joseph Gershenson
- Production company: Universal Pictures
- Distributed by: Universal Pictures
- Release date: May 9, 1952 (United States)
- Running time: 85 minutes
- Country: United States
- Language: English
- Box office: $1.1 million (US rentals)

Steel Town is a 1952 American action and romance film directed by George Sherman and starring Ann Sheridan, John Lund, and Howard Duff. Made in technicolor, location shooting took place at the Kaiser Steel Mill in Fontana, California with the remainder shot at Universal City. The film's sets were designed by the art directors Robert Clatworthy and Bernard Herzbrun.

== Plot ==
An attractive woman everybody knows as "Red" runs a restaurant. Her boyfriend Jim Denko, who works at the Kostane steel plant, comes to the restaurant for dinner, but when Red gives his steak away to a customer, words are exchanged and the men get into a fight.

It turns out the newcomer is boarding with the McNamara family—in Red's own room, in fact—and Red remains unaware that he is Steve Kostane, nephew of the steel company's owner. Red feels guilty about the fight and buys him a new jacket to replace the one that's ripped.

Not until girlfriend Valerie phones to ask for Steve Kostane by name does Red realize who he really is. But when Jim picks her up for a date, Steve sidetracks them by offering Jim money for a guided tour of the plant.

Steve begins work there the next day, surprising Jim with his effort. He becomes better acquainted with Red and breaks up with Valerie, but is blamed for a costly mistake at the factory when others don't realize that Steve was actually aiding Red's dad Mac McNamara in an emergency.

Red isn't sure how she feels about Steve until her father has another health crisis at work. Steve saves his life, and Red knows this is the man for her.

== Cast ==
- Ann Sheridan as "Red" McNamara
- John Lund as Steve Kostane
- Howard Duff as Jim Denko
- William Harrigan as Mac McNamara
- Eileen Crowe as Millie McNamara
- Chick Chandler as Ernie
- James Best as Joe Rakich
- Nancy Kulp as Dolores, waitress
- Elaine Riley as Valerie
- Tudor Owen as McIntosh
- Don Dillaway as Collin
- Gino Corrado as Diner Chef
- Lois Wilde as Nurse
- Frank Marlowe as Taxi Driver
- James Dime as Restaurant Customer

== Production ==
Jeff Chandler was originally announced to play the male lead.
