= Masquerade in Mexico =

1945 film by Mitchell Leisen

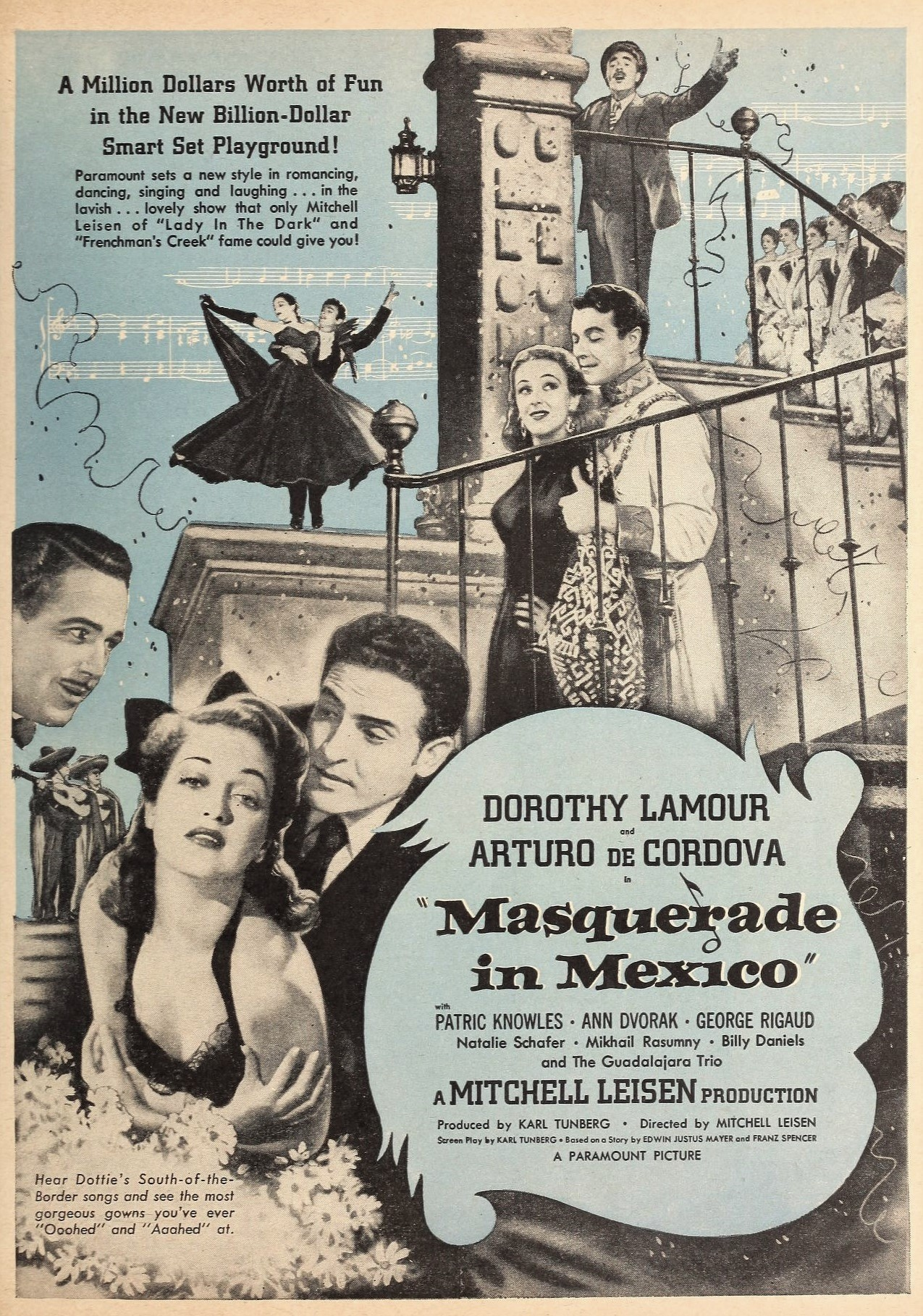
- Directed by: Mitchell Leisen
- Written by: Karl Tunberg; Edwin Justus Mayer; Franz Schulz
- Produced by: Karl Tunberg
- Starring: Dorothy Lamour; Arturo de Córdova; Patric Knowles; Ann Dvorak
- Cinematography: Lionel Lindon
- Edited by: Alma Macrorie
- Music by: Victor Young
- Production company: Paramount Pictures
- Distributed by: Paramount Pictures
- Release date: December 3, 1945
- Running time: 96 minutes
- Country: United States
- Language: English

Masquerade in Mexico is a 1945 American comedy film directed by Mitchell Leisen and starring Dorothy Lamour, Arturo de Córdova, Patric Knowles and Ann Dvorak. It was produced and distributed by Paramount Pictures. It was part of a series of films set in Latin America produced by Hollywood in the 1940s in line with the Good Neighbor policy. The film is a remake of Midnight (1939), also directed by Leisen.

== Plot ==
On a flight to Mexico City, banker Tom Grant becomes ill. Angel O'Reilly, who is sitting nearby, slips a diamond into his pocket while smuggling it for Boris Cassal. At customs, Angel gets away while Tom is detained. Boris has taken her pocketbook, leaving her without money, Taxi driver Pablo helps her and later finds her work as a singer by telling the club owner that she is a Spanish countess

She is performing one night while Tom is at a table with estranged wife Helen and her new bullfighter beau, Manolo. It becomes obvious that Manolo is taken with Angel when she joins them. Tom encourages this, not being comfortable with Helen's seeing another man.

Tom offers to bankroll Angel's pretense as a countess, paying for a luxurious hotel suite and wardrobe. Boris is on to the charade, so when Angel is accused of being a fraud, Boris comes to the rescue by pretending to be the contessa's count.

Manolo and Boris each wants Angel for himself, but she's finding Tom more and more to her liking. She persuades him that Boris was to blame for her stunt at the airport, and while the bullfighter gallantly steps aside, Boris satisfies his own desires by stealing Helen's necklace.

== Cast ==
- Dorothy Lamour as Angel O'Reilly
- Arturo de Córdova as Manolo Sergovia
- Patric Knowles as Thomas Grant
- Ann Dvorak as Helen Grant
- George Rigaud as Boris Cassal
- Natalie Schafer as Irene Denny
- Mikhail Rasumny as Paolo
- Billy Daniel as Rico Fenway
- Martin Garralaga as Jose
- Frank Faylen as Brooklyn
- Juan Torena as Master of Ceremonies
- William Newell as FBI Agent
- James Flavin as FBI Agent
- Robert Middlemass as Customs Official
- Mae Busch as Party Guest
- Miriam Nelson as Party Guest
- Julia Faye as Party Guest

== Bibliography ==
- Rice, Christina. Ann Dvorak: Hollywood's Forgotten Rebel. University Press of Kentucky, 2013.
- Welky, David. The Moguls and the Dictators: Hollywood and the Coming of World War II. JHU Press, 2008.
