= Woman They Almost Lynched =

1953 film by Allan Dwan

- Theatrical release poster
- Directed by: Allan Dwan
- Screenplay by: Steve Fisher
- Based on: Woman They Almost Lynched by Michael Fessier
- Produced by: Allan Dwan
- Starring: John Lund; Brian Donlevy; Audrey Totter; Joan Leslie; Ben Cooper; James Brown; Nina Varela
- Cinematography: Reggie Lanning
- Edited by: Fred Allen
- Music by: Stanley Wilson
- Production company: Republic Pictures
- Distributed by: Republic Pictures
- Release date: March 20, 1953
- Running time: 90 minutes
- Country: United States
- Language: English

Woman They Almost Lynched is a 1953 American Western film directed by Allan Dwan and written by Steve Fisher. The film stars John Lund, Brian Donlevy, Audrey Totter, Joan Leslie, Ben Cooper, James Brown, and Nina Varela. The film was released on March 20, 1953, by Republic Pictures.

== Plot ==
Civil War factions along the Arkansas-Missouri border are warned by Border City's mayor, Delilah Courtney, to stay five miles from her neutral town or risk arrest. Delilah is not only the town's mayor, but also a prosperous mine owner who sells iron ore to both Union and Confederate sides, making a handsome profit by doing so. Quantrill, a former Confederate officer gone rogue, brings his gang of marauders to the region, including wife Kate, whom he kidnapped from Border City two years ago.

Another new arrival is Sally Maris, a school teacher, who has traveled from Michigan to reunite with her brother, Bitterroot Bill, the owner of a saloon. Having not seen Bill in 12 years, she is disappointed in what he has become. Kate and her husband Charles, leaders of the Quantrill gang, arrive in the town. Kate and Bill were formerly engaged and Bill never quite got over her marrying Charles. Kate taunts Bill to humliate him and Bill draws, intending to kill her, only to be gunned down in his own saloon by Delilah's mine foreman, Lance Horton. With her brother dead, and heavily in debt, Sally decides to stay in town and run the business.

Kate takes a dislike to Sally and eventually goads her into a catfight. The two women engage in a knock-down, drag-out, hair-pulling fistfight which is won by Sally. Enraged, Kate then challenges Sally to a gunfight. Sally surprises Kate with her weapon skills when she shoots first, wounding Kate in the hand. As Kate lies on the ground, holding her injured hand, Sally berates her for not acting like a woman. Kate's husband also ridicules her, saying, "“Why don’t you give up? She fights better than you. She shoots better than you. She even talks better than you." Another man adds, "I bet she even cooks better than you."

Quantrill's interest in the mine, owned by Delilah, pits him against foreman Lance, who is secretly a Confederate spy. Despite his killing of her brother, Sally falls in love with Lance. When Quantrill attempts to take over the mine, Delilah summons Union forces to drive Quantrill out of town.

During the battle between Union forces and Quantrill's men, Sally rescues Kate, saving her life. The two women then become friends and allies. Quantrill's gang retreats, leaving Kate to face the Union officers, who both want to hold her partly responsible for Quantrill's actions and also apprehend Lance, who is spying for the Confederates. Disguising herself as one of the saloon's singers, Kate sneaks out of town, taking Lance with her. Sally, in an attempt to save Lance, convinces the Union commander that she is actually the confederate spy. As she is about to be lynched, Kate appears and tells the hanging party that Sally is innocent and is just trying to protect the man she loves. Sally is freed and Kate rides away with Union troops giving chase. Sally returns to the saloon as the proprietor. After the war ends, Lance reappears and the two marry.

== Cast ==
- John Lund as Lance Horton
- Brian Donlevy as Charles Quantrill
- Audrey Totter as Kate Quantrill / Kitty McCoy
- Joan Leslie as Sally Maris
- Ben Cooper as Jesse James
- Nina Varela as Mayor Delilah Courtney
- Ellen Corby as First Townswoman
- Fern Hall as Second Woman
- Minerva Urecal as Mrs. Stuart
- Jim Davis as Cole Younger
- Reed Hadley as Bitterroot Bill Maris
- Ann Savage as Glenda
- Virginia Christine as Jenny
- Marilyn Lindsey as Rose
- Nacho Galindo as John Pablo
- James Brown as Frank James
- Dick Simmons as Army Captain
- Gordon Jones as Yankee Sergeant
- Frank Ferguson as Bartender
- Post Park as Stagecoach Driver
- Tom McDonough as Quantrill's Henchman
- Richard Crane as Yankee Lieutenant
- Carl Pitti as Bourreau
- Joe Yrigoyen as Prisoner Guard
- Jimmy Hawkins as Malcolm Stuart
- James Kirkwood, Sr. as Old Man
- Paul Livermore as Bill Anderson

== Reception and legacy ==
Directed by Allan Dwan, the film is one of the few westerns featuring mostly female characters and while it was dismissed as a lightweight, low-budget western when initially released, the movie has gained cult status over time. The film historian Michael Klossner wrote in the Encyclopedia of Arkansas:

Woman They Almost Lynched was released during a brief boom in women-centered westerns, after Outlaw Women (1952) and before Johnny Guitar (starring a seething Joan Crawford) and Jesse James' Women (both 1954). In 1982, the inconsequential television film The Wild Women of Chastity Gulch starred Joan Collins as the dictatress of a neutral border town during the Civil War. The makers of this TV travesty clearly remembered Woman They Almost Lynched, but their movie—which has almost no men in the town to fear the women involved—was much less interesting than Dwan's.

Years after the film was released, Totter, described as a "tough, hard boiled blonde", said that both she and Joan Leslie found the film's dialogue amusing, intentional or not. She told an interviewer that she and Leslie performed much of the barroom brawl themselves, especially the close-ups.

Quentin Tarantino called this his favorite Dwan film, in part because of the "thrilling stagecoach robbery" shot by William Witney.
