= The Mating Season (film) =

1951 film by Mitchell Leisen

- Theatrical release poster
- Directed by: Mitchell Leisen
- Screenplay by: Charles Brackett; Walter Reisch; Richard Breen
- Based on: Maggie by Caesar Dunn
- Produced by: Charles Brackett
- Starring: Gene Tierney; John Lund; Miriam Hopkins; Thelma Ritter; Jan Sterling
- Cinematography: Charles Lang
- Edited by: Frank Bracht
- Music by: Joseph J. Lilley
- Production company: Paramount Pictures
- Distributed by: Paramount Pictures
- Release dates: March 29, 1951 (Los Angeles); April 11, 1951 (New York City)
- Running time: 101 minutes
- Country: United States
- Language: English
- Box office: $1,625,000 (U.S. rentals)

The Mating Season is a 1951 American romantic comedy-drama film directed by Mitchell Leisen and starring Gene Tierney, John Lund, Miriam Hopkins, Thelma Ritter, and Jan Sterling. The film was produced by Charles Brackett from a screenplay that he co-wrote with Walter Reisch and Richard Breen, based on the play Maggie by Caesar Dunn.

The film was considered Ritter's breakout performance and earned her strongly positive reviews. Shortly before the film's release, syndicated columnist Bob Thomas called her Hollywood's "most talked-about new starlet". Ritter's performance earned her second of four consecutive nominations for the Academy Award for Best Supporting Actress. She was nominated for the award six times, the most of any actress in history, but never won it.

== Plot ==
Ellen McNulty closes her hamburger stand in New Jersey and visits her son Val in Ohio, who has recently married a socialite named Maggie. When Ellen arrives, Maggie mistakes her for a chef sent to cook at her dinner party. Ellen, hoping to avoid embarrassing Maggie, does not correct her. After the party, Val persuades Ellen to live in his house.

The next morning, Ellen arrives with her possessions and continues the deception, explaining to Val that a mother-in-law in the house would only cause friction. Val reluctantly allows the charade to continue. Maggie's mother, a snob who disapproves of Val and Ellen, comes to stay at the house.

Maggie and Val lend Ellen to the Kalinger family, owners of the firm where Val works, for a party honoring Mr. and Mrs. Williamson, who own a Maryland firm with which the Kalinger firm is about to sign a major contract. Ellen discovers that Mr. Kalinger Jr., who had previously courted Maggie, is taking credit for Val's research that led to the contract, and she informs Mr. Kalinger Sr.

Kalinger Sr. invites Val and Maggie to the party, forcing Kalinger Jr. to reveal Val's role in the research. Maggie is insulted by Mrs. Williamson and storms out of the party. Val forces Maggie to call the party to apologize, which she does unwillingly, leading to another fight.

The next morning, Val and Maggie reconcile, agreeing that they were both wrong. Ellen's friends appear at the front door later and ask to speak to Mrs. McNulty, revealing to Maggie that Ellen is Val's mother. Maggie is furious with Val for hiding his mother's identity, and she departs with her mother for a hotel. When Maggie confronts Val at his office, he tries to explain, but Maggie refuses to listen. She tells him that he has become a snob and that she is moving to Mexico.

Mr. Kalinger brings Val and Maggie together and convinces Maggie to accompany him to the hotel bar for a farewell drink, knowing that Val will be there for a party. When Maggie sees Val, she again scolds him for trying to hide his mother and leaves the bar. Val leaves the party and rushes to fetch his mother. Maggie, who has returned to the bar, watches as Val introduces Ellen to Mrs. Williamson, who was about to hire Val but changes her mind when she learns of Ellen's social status. Kalinger Jr. also finds Ellen appalling, but Kalinger Sr. is delighted and wants to marry her.

== Cast ==
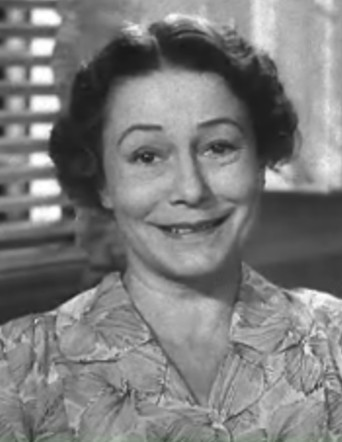
Thelma Ritter in The Mating Season

- Gene Tierney as Maggie Carleton McNulty
- John Lund as Val McNulty
- Miriam Hopkins as Fran Carleton
- Thelma Ritter as Ellen McNulty
- Jan Sterling as Betsy Donaldson
- Larry Keating as George Kalinger Sr.
- James Lorimer as George C. Kalinger Jr.
- Gladys Hurlbut as Natalie Conger
- Cora Witherspoon as Mrs. Owen Williamson
- Malcolm Keen as Owen Williamson
- Ellen Corby as Annie
- Billie Bird as Mugsy
- Mary Young as Spinster
- Samuel Colt as Colonel Conger
- Grayce Hampton as Mrs. Fahnstock
- William H. Welsh as Mr. Paget
- William Fawcett as Mr. Tuttle
- Carol Coombs as Susie

== Reception ==
In a contemporary review for The New York Times, critic Bosley Crowther praised Thelma Ritter's performance:

[W]hat she does with the character that she is given to play in this pastiche is almost enough to make a silk purse out of routine merchandise. We said almost. ... Miss Ritter rips into this character with all the gusto she might lavish on a steak, and the evidence of her satisfaction is very similar to what you might expect therefrom. ... Miss Ritter endows a candid low-brow with impressively high ideals. So full, in fact, is the picture of this diamond-in-the-rough that it bulges and bulks out of proportion in its two-dimensional frame. For the writer-producer, Mr. Brackett, who made the film for Paramount, has placed a believable character in an unbelievable plot. He has surrounded a creature of humor, integrity and gentle pathos with flimsy and shadowy figures from the romantic make-believe world.

Critic Philip K. Scheuer of the Los Angeles Times called the film "sentimental without sentimentality" and praised Ritter's performance as "make-believe tough, but with the heart of an old vaudevillian. The combination is eventually irresistible ... She is equally adept at slang slinging and humility."

In a review for Variety, William Brogdon wrote: "Its fun is brightly told and makes sense, and the trouping is smooth ... Bolstering the comedy considerably is fact the [sic] laughs are not based on situations that are too far-fetched ... Leisen's direction paces the comedy for full quip value over the 101-minute stretch. Dialog is loaded with zingy words and they are delivered with a wallop aimed straight at the risibilities."

== Awards ==
Thelma Ritter earned her second of four consecutive nominations for the Academy Award for Best Supporting Actress but lost to Kim Hunter for A Streetcar Named Desire.

The film won the Bronze Berlin Bear (Comedies) award at the 1951 Berlin International Film Festival.

== Comic-book adaption ==
- Eastern Color Movie Love #9 (June 1951)
