= Dakota Incident =

1956 film by Lewis R. Foster

- Film poster
- Directed by: Lewis R. Foster
- Written by: Frederick Louis Fox
- Produced by: Herbert J. Yates; Michael Baird
- Starring: Linda Darnell; Dale Robertson; John Lund; Ward Bond
- Cinematography: Ernest Haller
- Edited by: Howard A. Smith
- Music by: R. Dale Butts
- Color process: Trucolor
- Production company: Republic Pictures
- Distributed by: Republic Pictures
- Release date: 1956
- Running time: 89 minutes
- Country: United States
- Language: English

Dakota Incident is a 1956 American Western film directed by Lewis R. Foster and starring Linda Darnell, Dale Robertson, John Lund and Ward Bond. It was produced and distributed by Republic Pictures.

== Plot ==
On the run after a bank robbery, Rick Largo convinces his confederate, Frank Banner, to shoot Frank's own brother John, so they can split the booty two ways. Johnny, however, only pretends to be dead. Walking forty miles with his saddle he shows up in Christian Flats, buys the last horse in town and challenges his brother to a shoot-out, even though Frank swears that Largo fired the bullet. Frank misses and Johnny spares his life, then tells him to get out of town. Johnny next has a shootout with Largo, during which Largo is killed. With his vengeance completed, Johnny decides to go to Laramie, Wyoming.

Meanwhile, saloon singer Amy Clarke also determines to get to Laramie. She wants to catch up and retrieve $27,700 stolen from her in Abilene by her crooked agent and former sweetheart now on his way to Canada. The stagecoach to Laramie is full, but Amy bribes the clerk with one of her scented garters and gets a place. However, when the overdue Mile High line stagecoach arrives, the driver and horses are full of Cheyenne Indian arrows, and all the passengers are dead. Undaunted, Amy insists on taking the stage anyway and convinces Johnny to drive the coach and harness his newly-purchased horse to the rig.

Amy's French maid, Giselle, refuses to accompany her, but four other passengers ride along: the bombastic Senator Blakeley, who continually espouses the Indian cause despite only knowing them in "the literary sense"; Carter Hamilton, a bank clerk sought for the robbery committed by Johnny and his gang, who is determined to follow the outlaw until he can turn him in and clear his name; Mark Chester, a gold speculator from Pennsylvania; and Minstrel, Amy's accompanist, companion and protector. En route, the group stops to look for water and finds Frank's corpse in a waterhole pierced with Cheyenne arrows. It is then that Johnny reveals that Frank is his kid brother.

A short time later, they break a wheel, wreck the stage and the team of horses run off. The passengers take refuge in a dry creek gully but their precautions do not protect them from Cheyenne attack, during which Chester is killed, his bag full of fool's gold. A full-scale rifle battle ensues after which the Indians wait in the rocks above while the stranded travelers begin to feel the effects of thirst.

With each Indian attack Amy berates Blakeley for his support of the "savages," but he continues to find excuses for their actions. When Hamilton and Johnny decide to try to steal one of the Indians' horses and get help, Hamilton is injured and Johnny shoots the attacking Indian saving Hamilton, but the horses get away. When the two arrive back in the gully, they find Blakeley making a play for Amy. Although Amy rejects Blakeley by calling him "father," Johnny becomes jealous. As the group continues to suffer from heat and thirst, Minstrel sees a mirage and insists on going to it, with Hamilton, in his own state of delirium, holding a gun on Johnny believing that he lied about the lack of water. Minstrel is shot by the Indians, and a distraught Amy once again chides Blakeley. He decides to prove his pacifist methods by talking peace to the Indians. He goes out with open arms and his words of brotherhood echo back loudly from the rocks, but the Indians shoot him. As he dies, he concedes to Amy, who feels responsible for his death, that indeed words may not be enough, but that, perhaps, the Indians just did not understand.

Soon Hamilton, too, is near death and Johnny decides to risk his own life to save him and Amy by retrieving a canteen that the Indians planted as a lure. He takes the canteen but finds it dry. He begins to taunt the Indians. Just then the gully begins to fill up with water from rains higher up, and Amy, bringing a drink to Hamilton, discovers him dead. After an Indian – the only survivor of the attackers, and without ammunition for his rifle – attacks Johnny with a knife, Johnny almost drowns him, but decides to spare his life instead, telling him to return to his people and report that a white man gave him back his life. The Indian understands and speaks halting English.

Johnny tells Amy that he will keep his promise to the dying Hamilton to clear his name and return the money to the bank. She says that she no longer cares about her former sweetheart, and the two embrace just as the Indians return. The Indian whose life was spared brings two horses as a gift, and says he will walk back to his people. "The walk is part of the gift." he says. The couple regret that Blakeley could not have lived to see this last act of friendship.

== Cast ==
- Linda Darnell as Amy Clarke
- Dale Robertson as John Banner
- John Lund as John Carter (aka Hamilton)
- Ward Bond as Sen. Blakeley
- Regis Toomey as Minstrel
- Skip Homeier as Frank Banner
- Irving Bacon as Tully Morgan
- John Doucette as Rick Largo
- Whit Bissell as Mark Chester
- William Fawcett as Matthew Barnes
- Malcolm Atterbury as Bartender / Desk Clerk
- Diane Dubois as Giselle
- Charles Horvath as Cheyenne Leader

== Reception ==
Richard W. Nason of the New York Times called it "an erratic and moralistic Western".

== See also ==
- List of American films of 1956
