= Alma Macrorie =

American film editor and actress (1904–1970)

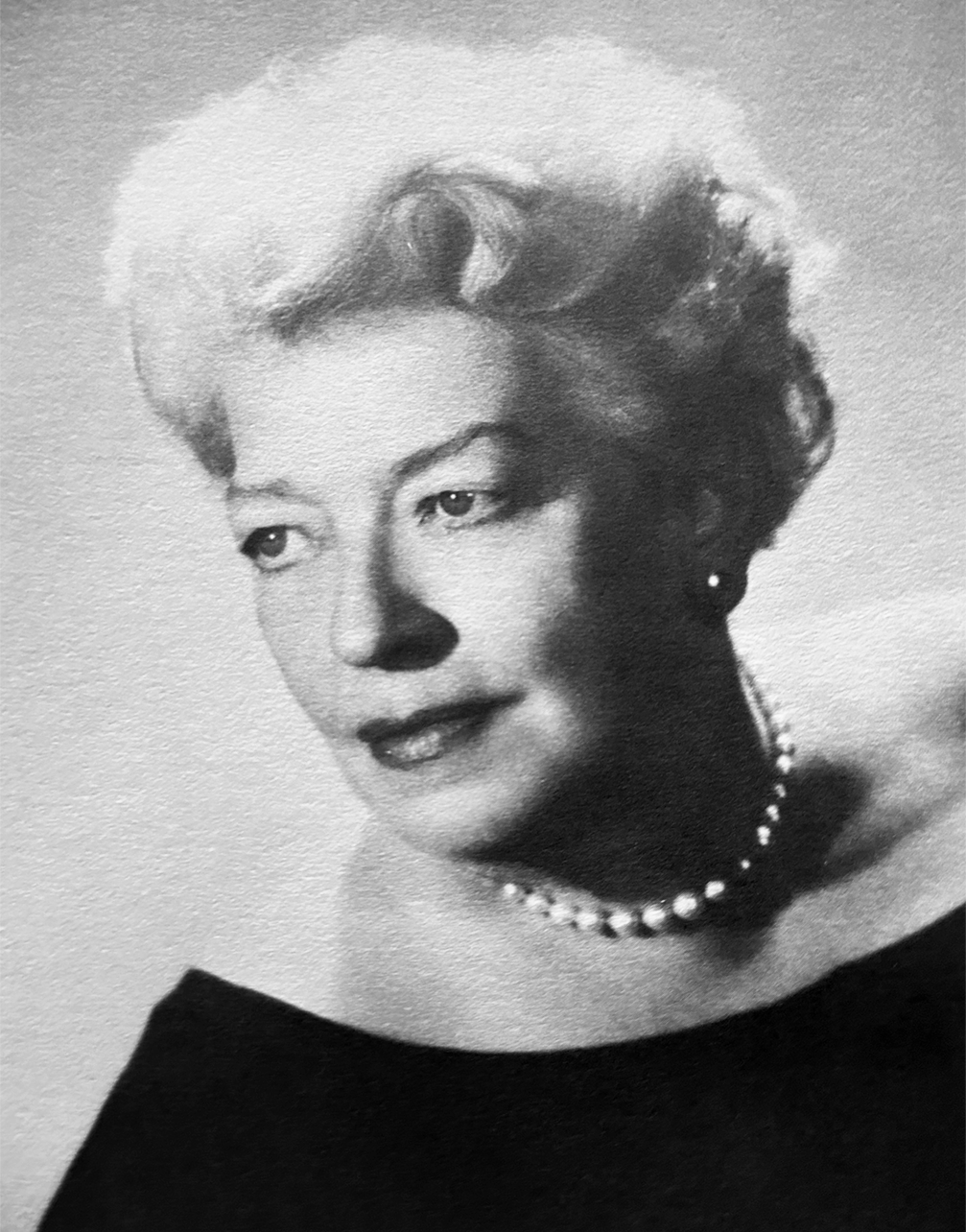
- Born: Alma Ruth Macrorie; December 7, 1904; Davenport, Iowa, U.S.
- Died: June 28, 1970 (aged 65); Woodland Hills, Los Angeles, California, U.S.
- Education: Davenport High School
- Occupations: Film editor, actress
- Years active: 1937–1968

Alma Ruth Macrorie (December 7, 1904 – June 28, 1970) was an American film editor and occasional actress. In 1956, she received an Academy Award nomination for editing the film The Bridges at Toko-Ri.

== Early years ==
Alma was born in Davenport, Iowa, to Rutherford Macrorie and Catherine McKinney; she was their only child together. Macrorie attended Davenport High School and was active in declamation competition there.

== Career ==
One of Macrorie's early film editing assignments was Road to Zanzibar (1941). She had dual responsibilities with To Each His Own (1946), acting in the film in addition to editing it. She took on the acting role at the request of director Mitchell Leisen. Following that experience, she continued to act while editing, although not on the same films. She acted in The Emperor Waltz and Dear Wife while editing Bride of Vengeance and The Sin of Abby Hart. Macrorie won Eddie Awards from the American Cinema Editors for her editing of The Bridges at Toko-Ri and Teacher's Pet (1958).

== Death ==
On June 28, 1970, Macrorie died in Woodland Hills, California, at the Motion Picture & Television Country House and Hospital. She was 65 years old.

== Selected filmography (as editor) ==
- What's So Bad About Feeling Good? (1968)
- Gambit (1966)
- A Man Could Get Killed (1966)
- Love Has Many Faces (1965)
- Captain Newman, M.D. (1963)
- For Love or Money (1963)
- The Counterfeit Traitor (1962)
- The Pleasure of His Company (1961)
- The Rat Race (1960)
- But Not for Me (1959)
- The Geisha Boy (1958)
- Rock-a-Bye Baby (1958)
- Teacher's Pet (1958)
- The Tin Star (1957)
- Three Violent People (1956)
- The Proud and Profane (1956)
- The Trouble with Harry (1955)
- The Bridges at Toko-Ri (1954)
- Knock on Wood (1954)
- Little Boy Lost (1953)
- Botany Bay (1952)
- Anything Can Happen (1952)
- Rhubarb (1951)
- Dear Brat (1951)
- Captain Carey, U.S.A. (1950)
- No Man of Her Own (1950)
- Song of Surrender (1949)
- Bride of Vengeance (1949)
- Sealed Verdict (1948)
- Dream Girl (1948)
- Golden Earrings (1947)
- Suddenly It's Spring (1947)
- To Each His Own (1946)
- Masquerade in Mexico (1945)
- Kitty (1944)
- Frenchman's Creek (1944)
- Lady in the Dark (1944)
- No Time for Love (1943)
- My Heart Belongs to Daddy (1942)
- Sweater Girl (1942)
- True to the Army (1942)
- Nothing But the Truth (1941)
- Road to Zanzibar (1941)
- A Night at Earl Carroll's (1940)
- The Quarterback (1940)
- Typhoon (1940)
- The Star Maker (1939)
- Invitation to Happiness (1939)
- Boy Trouble (1939)
- Paris Honeymoon (1939)
- Thanks for the Memory (1938)
- Sing, You Sinners (1938)
- Artists & Models (1937)
