= James Dime =

American actor

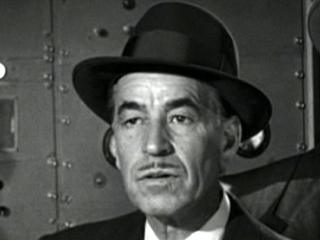
- James Dime in King Kong (1933)
- Born: December 19, 1897
- Died: May 11, 1981 (aged 83); Woodland Hills, Los Angeles, California, United States
- Occupation: Actor
- Years active: 1925–1965

James Dime (December 19, 1897 – May 11, 1981), nicknamed Sheik of Spring Street, was a Yugoslavian-American professional boxer and actor known for The Last Hurrah (1958), So Big (1953), Steel Town (1952), Anne of the Indies (1951), Sudan (1945), The Seventh Cross (1944), Crazy House (1943), Stand and Deliver (1928), The King of Kings (1927) as a Roman soldier and Keep 'Em Sailing (1942).

He worked mostly in anonymity. He was injured falling from a tower while shooting The Lives of a Bengal Lancer (1935). He doubled Monte Blue on Hawk of the Wilderness (1938).

== Filmography ==
- The King of Kings (1927)
- Stand and Deliver (1928)
- King Kong (1933) – Member of Ship's Crew (uncredited)
- The Lives of a Bengal Lancer (1935)
- The Buccaneer (1938)
- Hawk of the Wilderness (1938)
- Captain Caution (1940)
- Reap the Wild Wind (1942)
- Crazy House (1943)
- Frenchman's Creek (1944)
- The Seventh Cross (1944)
- The Spanish Main (1945)
- Sudan (1945)
- Wake of the Red Witch (1948)
- Fortunes of Captain Blood (1950)
- Anne of the Indies (1951)
- Steel Town (1952)
- Julius Caesar (1953)
- So Big (1953)
- Prince Valiant (1954)
- Around the World in Eighty Days (1956)
- The Last Hurrah (1958)
