= Frenchman's Creek (film) =

1944 film by Mitchell Leisen

- Theatrical poster
- Directed by: Mitchell Leisen
- Screenplay by: Talbot Jennings
- Based on: Frenchman's Creek; 1941 novel by Daphne Du Maurier
- Produced by: Buddy G. DeSylva
- Starring: Joan Fontaine; Arturo de Córdova; Basil Rathbone
- Cinematography: George Barnes
- Edited by: Alma Macrorie
- Music by: Victor Young
- Production company: Paramount Pictures
- Distributed by: Paramount Pictures
- Release dates: September 20, 1944 (New York City); January 8, 1945 (Los Angeles)
- Running time: 113 minutes
- Country: United States
- Language: English
- Budget: $3.6 million
- Box office: $3.5 million (U.S. and Canada rentals)

Frenchman's Creek is a 1944 adventure film adaptation of Daphne du Maurier's 1941 novel of the same name, about an aristocratic English woman who falls in love with a French pirate. The film was released by Paramount Pictures and starred Joan Fontaine, Arturo de Córdova, Basil Rathbone, Cecil Kellaway, and Nigel Bruce. Filmed in Technicolor, it was directed by Mitchell Leisen. The musical score was by Victor Young, who incorporated the main theme of French composer Claude Debussy's Clair de Lune as the love theme for the film.

The film is a mostly faithful adaptation of the novel, taking place during the reign of Charles II in the mid-17th century, mostly in the Cornish region of England.

The film was released as an on demand DVD August 28, 2014 (Amazon); and has been shown on American Movie Classics and Turner Classic Movies.

== Plot ==
Dona St. Columb is disgusted by the superficial court society in London and her fatuous husband. After her husband's friend, Lord Rockingham, makes unwanted advances she take her two children to their remote estate in Navron, Cornwall. The property has been vacant for years and she discovers that a notorious French pirate, Jean Benoit Aubrey, has been using it for his base of operations. Aubrey is said to be a desperate scoundrel who is terrorizing the well-to-do gentry of the Cornish coast. But when Dona meets Aubrey she finds he is a dashing, educated, and principled man who even sketches her portrait. They quickly fall in love.

Dona strongly desires thrills and adventure. And so she dresses as a cabin boy and joins the pirate crew on an expedition to capture a richly laden merchant ship (the Merry Fortune) belonging to one of her neighbors. The attack is a success but the news of it brings Dona's husband, Harry, and the evil Rockingham to Cornwall, disrupting her idyllic romance. Harry, Rockingham and the other locals meet at Navron to plot how to capture the pirate, but Aubrey and his crew cleverly manage to capture and rob their would-be captors instead.

Rockingham, who has designs on Dona himself, perceives the relationship between her and Aubrey, and Dona is forced to kill him in self-defense when he attacks her in a jealous rage. Meanwhile, Aubrey is captured and accused of Rockingham's death while trying to return to his ship. Dona hatches a plot for his release, which succeeds. However, in the end she chooses to stay with her husband for the sake of her children while Aubrey returns to his ship.

== Cast ==
- Joan Fontaine as Dona St. Columb
- Arturo de Córdova as Jean Benoit Aubrey
- Basil Rathbone as Lord Rockingham
- Nigel Bruce as Lord Godolphin
- Cecil Kellaway as William
- Ralph Forbes as Harry St. Columb
- Harald Ramond as Edmond
- Billy Daniels as Pierre Blanc
- Moyna Macgill as Lady Godolphin
- Patricia Barker as Henrietta
- David James as James
- Charles Coleman as Thomas (uncredited)
- James Dime as Pirate (uncredited)
- Al Ferguson as Guard (uncredited)

== Production ==
Fontaine was under contract to independent producer to David O. Selznick, who loaned out his contract players to other studios. In this case, Fontaine was loaned to Paramount for this lavish production. She later complained about her work with director Leisen and some of her costars. The film's budget of $3.6 million made it Paramount's most expensive production up to that time.

Producer David Lewis had just joined Paramount and was assigned to the film by head of production Buddy DeSylva. The director of the film was Mitchell Leisen. Lewis wrote De Sylva "knew I disliked Leisen and his work, but ignored my feelings. Leisen was his pet and DeSylva’s preferences were for splashy production over story content."

Lewis also wrote "Joan was as wrong as possibly could be for the Du Maurier heroine; we needed a vivid woman. (I had envisioned Vivien Leigh, whom Selznick afterward told me could have been had for the part.) Arturo de Cordova was entirely untried in American films, although he was very popular in Mexico. He was a rather lethargic, not particularly handsome young man. Leisen didn’t much like the idea of him much either, but the studio thought him a future Valentino."

Cast members Rathbone and Bruce were known for appearing together as Holmes and Watson, respectively, in the Sherlock Holmes films by Universal Studios. Frenchman's Creek was their only on-screen collaboration besides the Holmes films.

According to Lewis, De Sylva told Leisen the director could take as long as he could to finish the film. He also said Leisen kept wanting to return the script to the du Maurier original.

== Reception ==
Bosley Crowther of The New York Times called the film "somewhat slow in starting", but observed that the production values were suitably extravagant and invited readers to "catch a post-chaise to the Rivoli and check your think-cap at the door if you want a two-hour excursion in fancy-pants cloak-and-sword escape." Variety agreed that the production values were "ultra", but found that the script "at times borders on the ludicrous". Harrison's Reports called it "A good costume entertainment" with "a fair quota of thrills ... It does, however, have many slow spots, and some judicious cutting would help matters considerably." John Lardner of The New Yorker wrote: "Not having read the Daphne du Maurier novel called Frenchman's Creek, I am powerless to say how it compares with the picture of the same name. My guess, like any gallant fellow's, would be that it compares favorably." In The Nation in 1944, critic James Agee wrote, "This film, like the "novel" it improves on, is masturbation-fantasy triple-distilled, infallible as any real-life dream and as viciously fascinating as reading such a dream over the terrible dreamer's shoulder ... None of the unusually resourceful Technicolor, wax-fruit dialogue, or munificence of costume and social degree conceals the fact that this is really just an archetypally sordid, contemporary middle-bracket flirtation, told without perception, warmth, honor, or irony from the center of a soul like a powder-parlor—but told, in those terms, with the gloves off, and every cowardly emotion and creepy desire and sniveling motive caught red-handed."

Lewis said "I hated the film—thought it pretentious and vulgar, although physically beautiful.. The pirates were Leisen favorites and about as puny a crew as ever didn’t sail the oceans."

== Awards ==
The film won an Academy Award for Best Art Direction (Hans Dreier, Ernst Fegté, Samuel M. Comer).

== See also ==
- The Wicked Lady, a British film made a year later and telling a similar story but with very different sensibilities.
- List of American films of 1944

== Notes ==
- Lewis, David (1993). Curtis, James (ed.). The Creative Producer. Metuchen: Scarecrow Press. ISBN 0-8108-2720-4.
