= To Each His Own (1946 film) =

1946 film by Mitchell Leisen

- Theatrical release poster
- Directed by: Mitchell Leisen
- Screenplay by: Charles Brackett; Jacques Théry (as Jacques Thery)
- Story by: Charles Brackett
- Produced by: Charles Brackett
- Starring: Olivia de Havilland; Mary Anderson; Roland Culver; John Lund
- Cinematography: Daniel L. Fapp
- Edited by: Alma Macrorie
- Music by: Victor Young
- Production company: Paramount Pictures
- Distributed by: Paramount Pictures
- Release dates: March 12, 1946 (United States); May 23, 1946 (New York City)
- Running time: 122 minutes
- Country: United States
- Language: English
- Box office: $3.6 million (US rentals)

To Each His Own is a 1946 American romantic drama film directed by Mitchell Leisen and starring Olivia de Havilland, Mary Anderson, Roland Culver and John Lund. It was produced and distributed by Paramount Pictures. The screenplay was written by Charles Brackett and Jacques Théry. A young woman bears a child out of wedlock and has to give him up.

De Havilland won the Academy Award for Best Actress. Brackett was nominated for Best Writing, Original Story. The title song (music by Jay Livingston and lyrics by Ray Evans) became a hit.

== Plot ==
In World War II London, England, fire wardens Josephine "Jody" Norris and Lord Desham keep vigil and bond over being lonely, middle-aged people. While Desham is arranging dinner plans, a man from Jody's hometown turns up and tells her that someone from their town is arriving at the train station. Overjoyed, she rushes to the station and runs into a young woman who is waiting for her pilot beau, which sends Jody into a flashback.

Jody is the belle of her small American hometown of Piersen Falls. Both Alec Piersen and traveling salesman Mac Tilton propose to her, but she turns them down. Alec marries Corinne, his second choice. When handsome US Army Air Service fighter pilot Captain Bart Cosgrove flies in to promote a World War I bond drive, he and Jody fall in love, though they have only one night together.

Later, a pregnant Jody is secretly visiting a doctor in New York and is advised that her life is in danger and she needs an operation. She agrees, though she would lose her unborn child. When she learns that Bart has been killed in action, she changes her mind and secretly gives birth to their son in 1919. She tries to arrange it so that she can "adopt" the boy without scandal, but the scheme backfires. Corinne loses her own newborn that same day but is consoled by Jody's. Jody loves her son, named Gregory or "Griggsy", from afar.

Jody's father dies, forcing her to sell the family drugstore. When Jody asks to become Griggsy's live-in nurse, Corinne turns her down. Agitated, Jody reveals that she is Griggsy's mother. Knowing that her husband never loved her, Corinne is determined to keep the one person who does.

Jody moves to New York City to work for Mac and discovers that he is a bootlegger, using a cosmetics business as a front. The same day, the place is raided by the police, leaving Mac with nothing but the cosmetics equipment. Jody persuades him to make cold cream; with her drive and determination, she builds a thriving business, and they become rich.

In 1924, she forces Corinne to give her Griggsy by threatening to block a bank loan for Alec's failing business. After two months, however, Jody has not revealed her identity to Griggsy, and the boy is miserably homesick. When she attempts to tell him that she is his mother, Griggsy begins crying at the mention of his adoption, which Corinne has already discussed with him. Jody gives up and sends him back to Corinne and Alec.

Heartbroken, Jody leaves the US to immerse herself in work, running the English branch of her Lady Vyvyan Cosmetics Company. During World War II, her son becomes a pilot in the 8th Air Force. When he gets a leave in London, Jody meets his train and fusses over him, arranging for him and his WREN fiancée, Liz, the young woman she bumped into, to stay at her apartment and go out on the town. Griggsy tells Jody that he and Liz have been struggling to get married all day, as England requires a 15-day delay. Because they cannot be married, he will end his leave early.

Lord Desham, who is attracted to Jody, arrives at her apartment and finds her despondent over the fact that Griggsy will not be staying the week in London. She also lets out that she is his mother. Using his influence, Desham arranges for the young man to marry his fiancée without the customary delay. After some broad hints from Desham and musing from his new wife, Lieutenant Piersen realizes why Jody has been so helpful and asks his mother, by that title, for a dance.

== Cast ==
- Olivia de Havilland as Miss Josephine 'Jody' Norris (as Olivia De Havilland)
- Mary Anderson as Corinne Piersen
- Roland Culver as Lord Desham
- Phillip Terry as Alec Piersen
- Bill Goodwin as Mac Tilton
- Virginia Welles as Liz Lorimer
- Victoria Horne as Nurse Daisy Gingras
- Griff Barnett as Daniel Norris
- Alma Macrorie as Belle Ingram
- Billy Ward as Gregory - Younger (as Bill Ward)
- Frank Faylen as Babe
- Willard Robertson as Dr. Hunt
- Arthur Loft as Bernadock Clinton
- Virginia Farmer as Mrs. Cora Clinton
- Doris Lloyd as Miss Pringle
- Clyde Cook as Mr. Harkett
- Ida Moore as Miss Claflin
- Mary Young as Mrs. Nix
- John Lund as Captain Bart Cosgrove / Gregory Pierson
- Will Stanton as Funny Waiter (uncredited)

== Home media ==
- To Each His Own (VHS). Universal Studios. February 17, 1998.
- To Each His Own (DVD (region 2)). Universal Studios.

== Adaptation ==
The film inspired the Indian writer Sachin Bhowmick to work on a script thematically similar to To Each His Own; later on it was filmed as Aradhana (1969) and went to become one of the most successful films in Hindi cinema. The film is considered a milestone in Rajesh Khanna's career. The film also was remade in Turkish as Kadın Asla Unutmaz, directed by Orhan Aksoy, released in the same year.

Aradhana was remade in Telugu as Kannavari Kalalu and in Tamil as Sivagamiyin Selvan.

== Critical reception ==
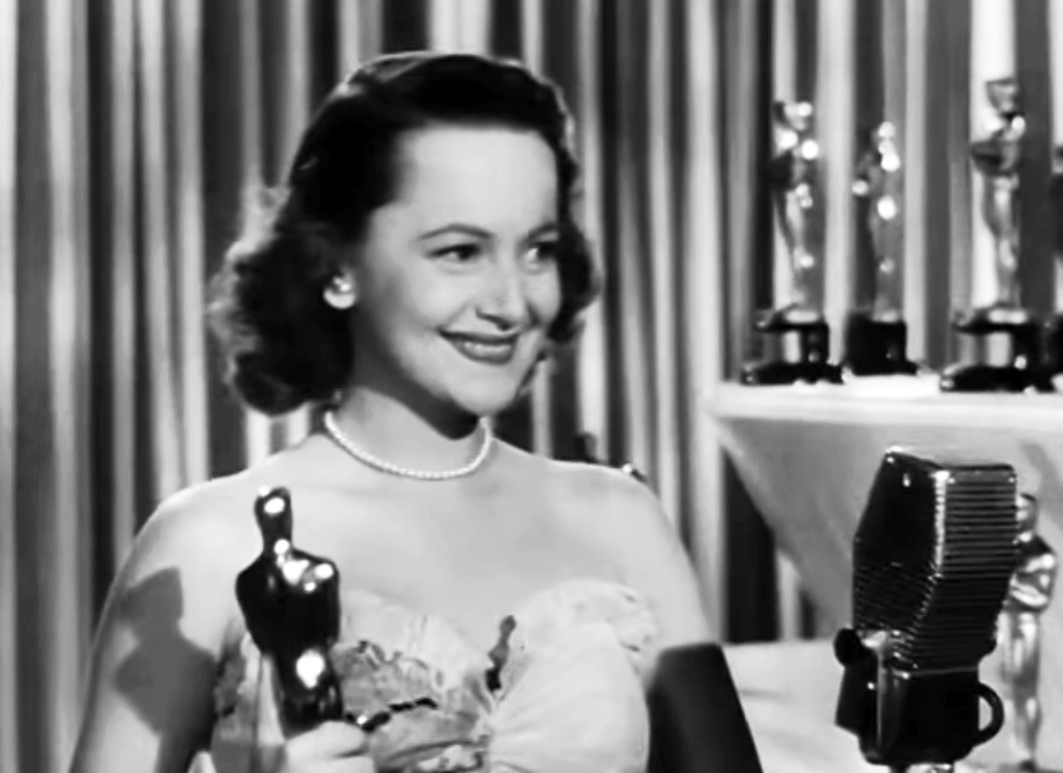
Olivia de Havilland accepting her Academy Award for To Each His Own

Alt Film Guide said: "To Each His Own is surprisingly direct in its handling of an unwed mother, paralleling Jody's increasing coldness with the detached—but honest—flashbacks that comprise the bulk of the film." One reviewer at Cinescene said: "In To Each His Own, the sufferer is able to learn something from her mistakes and misfortunes, growing past her grief and distress into a kind of wisdom. The picture has style, but also a sincerity of sentiment that gives it distinction." Another wrote: "Forthrightly feminist avant la lettre, the film is conscious of constraints, but committed to its movement forward: less resentful than resourceful, and more stalwart than strident, yet angry and determined nonetheless." In The Nation in 1946, critic James Agee wrote: "To Each His Own is so little worth talking about that I will make few more comparisons: let it suffice that from the moment the girl knows she is pregnant she acts like the moral coward nearly everyone in Hollywood and in the audience requires her to be, and that every plot complication and tearjerk from there on proceeds from, and exploits, premises of cowardice, cynicism, and the rottenest kinds of sentimetality."

ClassicFilmGuide deemed it "A marvelous sentimental (and now dated) story ". JigsawLounge wrote: "Brackett's screenplay is a wonder of intricate construction, with pretty much every minor detail of character and plot introduced for a reason which 'pays off' much later in the script. On sober reflection, it is a rather tall tale—and more than the usual degree of disbelief-suspension may be required here and there. But this should prove a very simple task for all but the most hard-headed of audiences: To Each His Own's combination of emotional resonance and a lively wit is potent, and enduring." San.beck said: "This maudlin drama explores the loneliness of a woman who is successful in business but has only one relative she rarely sees. The world wars made for some quick marriages and many widows." NicksFlickPicks gave the film a rating of 3 stars out of 5. TV Guide said: "What might have been a trite soap opera is elevated to the status of superior emotional drama by a wise script, sensitive direction, and an Oscar-winning performance by de Havilland."

=== Awards and nominations ===
Award	Category	Nominee(s)	Result	Ref.
Academy Awards	Best Actress	Olivia de Havilland	Won	
Academy Awards	Best Motion Picture Story	Charles Brackett	Nominated	
New York Film Critics Circle Awards	Best Actress	Olivia de Havilland	Nominated	
