= Just Across the Street =

1952 film by Joseph Pevney

- Directed by: Joseph Pevney
- Written by: Roswell Rogers; Joel Malone
- Produced by: Leonard Goldstein
- Starring: Ann Sheridan; John Lund; Cecil Kellaway
- Cinematography: Maury Gertsman
- Edited by: Virgil W. Vogel
- Color process: Black and white
- Production company: Universal Pictures
- Distributed by: Universal Pictures
- Release dates: June 15, 1952 (Los Angeles); June 27, 1952 (New York)
- Running time: 79 minutes
- Country: United States
- Language: English

Just Across the Street is a 1952 American comedy film directed by Joseph Pevney and starring Ann Sheridan, John Lund and Cecil Kellaway. It was produced and distributed by Universal Pictures.

== Plot ==
Henrietta Smith applies for a job as a social secretary for the wealthy Medford family and is mistaken for the spoiled daughter of the house by young plumber Fred Newcombe. Although Fred thinks that she is wealthy, he hires Henrietta as his secretary, believing that she needs to prove useful. Henrietta maintains the ruse, even allowing Fred to drive her to the wealthy section of town and then catching a bus to her real home. Mr. Medford suspects that his wife is having a secret affair with Fred, and Mrs. Medford harbors a similar suspicion about her husband and Henrietta.

== Cast ==
- Ann Sheridan as Henrietta Smith
- John Lund as Fred Newcombe
- Robert Keith as Walter Medford
- Cecil Kellaway as Pop Smith
- Harvey Lembeck as Al
- Natalie Schafer as Gertrude Medford
- Alan Mowbray as Davis
- Billie Bird as Pearl
- George Eldredge as John Ballanger

== Reception ==
In a contemporary review for The New York Times, critic Howard Thompson called the film "a pretty fair example of how an inexpensive film with a small cast can be made to bounce good-naturedly off the assembly line with no harm done" and wrote: "[T]his Leonard Goldstein production for Universal-International, starring Ann Sheridan and John Lund, unwinds with such unassuming drollery that even some arch contrivances and a messy windup don't quite spoil the flavor of a rather unexpected broth. [D]irector Joseph Pevney has paced the action and humor with disarming unpretentiousness. But the loud helter-skelter climax is so crammed with slamming doors and coy coincidence that the film becomes more of a wise accident than a bright surprise. All the same, it has its moments."
