= A Foreign Affair =

1948 film by Billy Wilder

- Theatrical release poster
- Directed by: Billy Wilder
- Screenplay by: Charles Brackett; Billy Wilder; Richard L. Breen; Robert Harari (adaptation)
- Story by: David Shaw
- Produced by: Charles Brackett
- Starring: Jean Arthur; Marlene Dietrich; John Lund; Millard Mitchell
- Cinematography: Charles B. Lang Jr.
- Edited by: Doane Harrison
- Music by: Frederick Hollander
- Production company: Paramount Pictures
- Distributed by: Paramount Pictures
- Release dates: June 30, 1948 (New York); July 22, 1948 (Los Angeles)
- Running time: 116 minutes
- Country: United States
- Languages: English; German
- Box office: $2.5 million (US rentals)

A Foreign Affair is a 1948 American romantic comedy-drama film directed by Billy Wilder and starring Jean Arthur, Marlene Dietrich and John Lund. The screenplay by Charles Brackett, Wilder and Richard L. Breen is based on a story by David Shaw adapted by Robert Harari.

The film is about a United States Army captain in post-World War II Berlin, occupied by the Allies during the early days of the Cold War, who is torn between a former Nazi cafe singer and the American congresswoman investigating her. Though a comedy, the film has a serious and cynical political tone, attesting to the fascination of both Wilder and American audiences with the multiple legacies of Berlin.

== Plot ==
In 1947 in post-World War II Berlin, prim Iowa congresswoman Phoebe Frost arrives with a congressional committee on a fact-finding mission to investigate the morale of American occupation troops reportedly infected by a "moral malaria." Corruption runs rampant, with troops taking advantage of supply shortages to gain profit as well as privileges from local women. Military officials defend the behavior of the troops.

Phoebe arrives with a birthday cake for a constituent's boyfriend, Captain John Pringle. He trades the cake on the black market for a mattress for his lover, Erika von Schlütow. MPs arrive to question Erika, who had been ordered to a labor camp for brickwork but has instead been working in a nightclub, protected by her relationship with Pringle. The MPs order Erika to report to the denazification office, but Pringle sends them away.

On a tour of bomb-ravaged Berlin, Phoebe notices how many American soldiers fraternize with local women. The guide describes how they are winning over the population, but Phoebe wonders who is influencing whom. Slipping away from the tour, Phoebe is mistaken for a local by two American soldiers; she pretends to speak only broken English and accompanies them to the Club Lorelei, the most popular troop hangout. There she sees cabaret torch singer Erika von Schlütow, who is rumored to be the former mistress of either Hermann Göring or Joseph Goebbels. Phoebe enlists Captain Pringle to assist in her investigation of Erika, unaware that he is Erika's current lover.

After seeing Erika with Adolf Hitler in a newsreel filmed during the war, Phoebe asks John to take her to army headquarters to retrieve Erika's official file. To distract her, John woos Phoebe, who initially resists his advances. When Phoebe berates the ethics of American soldiers who cavort with former Nazis, John asks Phoebe whether she ever had a romance against her political ethics. She tells him how enamored she was of a Southern Congressman who romanced her just to get her vote. Taking his cue, John turns on the charm, to which Phoebe eventually succumbs.

Erika questions why John has not been seeing her lately. John replies that he had not realized the depth of her involvement with Nazi officials and questions whether next year she might be romancing officers wearing a hammer and sickle. When Erika mocks him, he responds coldly and departs. John and Phoebe visit Club Lorelei, where Erika joins their table and needles Phoebe.

Colonel Plummer orders John to continue seeing Erika to serve as bait for Hans Otto Birgel, a former Gestapo agent believed to be hiding in the American occupation zone. A letter has been intercepted in which the jealous agent has threatened to kill Erika's new lover.

Erika and Phoebe are arrested during a raid at the club designed to catch Germans lacking identification papers. At the police station, Erika claims that Phoebe is her cousin in order to secure her release without revealing her identity, avoiding scandal. At Erika's apartment, Erika explains that Phoebe is in her debt and owes her John, her protector. When John arrives, Phoebe, who is out of his line of sight, sees John kissing Erika and leaves humiliated.

At the military airport waiting for departure, Phoebe tells Plummer that she will not be filing her report, as she feels ethically compromised. Plummer discloses that John has been following orders all along to use Erika to lead them to Birgel and now has a target on his back. Plummer tells Phoebe that John's feelings for her have complicated matters.

Birgel appears at the club to shoot John, but Birgel is shot first by American soldiers. Erika is arrested for her complicity with Birgel. Phoebe and John are finally united.

== Cast ==
- Jean Arthur as Congresswoman Phoebe Frost
- Marlene Dietrich as Erika von Schlütow
- John Lund as Captain John Pringle
- Millard Mitchell as Col. Rufus J. Plummer
- Peter von Zerneck as Hans Otto Birgel
- Stanley Prager as Mike
- Bill Murphy as Joe
- Raymond Bond as Congressman Pennecot
- Boyd Davis as Congressman Giffin
- Robert Malcolm as Congressman Kramer
- Charles Meredith as Congressman Yandell
- Michael Raffetto as Congressman Salvatore
- Damian O'Flynn as a lieutenant colonel
- Frank Fenton as Major Mathews
- James Larmore as Lieutenant Hornby
- Gordon Jones as a military policeman
- Fred Steele as a military policeman
- Friedrich Hollaender as pianist at the Lorelei night club (uncredited)
- Rex Lease as a military police lieutenant (uncredited)
- Edward Van Sloan as German (uncredited)
- Bobby Watson as Adolf Hitler (uncredited)

== Production ==
While serving with the United States Army in Germany during World War II, Billy Wilder was promised government assistance if he made a film about Allied-occupied Germany, and he took advantage of the offer by developing A Foreign Affair with Charles Brackett and Richard L. Breen. Erich Pommer, who was responsible for the rebuilding of the German film industry, placed what was left of the facilities at Universum Film AG at Wilder's disposal. While researching the existing situation for his screenplay, he interviewed many of the American military personnel stationed in Berlin, as well as its residents, many of whom were having difficulty dealing with the destruction of the city.

Marlene Dietrich was Wilder's first choice to play Erika, and Friedrich Hollaender already had written three songs—"Black Market", "Illusions" and "The Ruins of Berlin"—for her to sing in the film. Wilder feared that Dietrich would not portray a Nazi collaborator, but he was able to convince her. In the film, Dietrich appears in two gowns designed by Irene that she had worn while entertaining American troops during the war.

Wilder persuaded Jean Arthur, who was attending college, to leave her retirement to play Phoebe. Throughout filming, Arthur felt that Wilder favored Dietrich. After the film, Arthur signed a 12-year, four-picture deal with Paramount.

Location shooting, much of which occurred in the Soviet occupation zone, began in August 1947, and filming continued at Paramount Pictures in Hollywood between December 1947 and February 1948. The film was edited within a week after principal photography was completed, and it premiered at the Paramount Theatre in New York City on June 30, 1948, shortly after Wilder's The Emperor Waltz opened at Radio City Music Hall.

== Release ==
The film's world premiere was held at the Paramount Theatre in New York on June 30, 1948.

== Reception ==
In a contemporary review for The New York Times, critic Bosley Crowther called A Foreign Affair "a dandy entertainment which has some shrewd and realistic things to say" and wrote:

Maybe you think there's nothing funny about the current situation of American troops in the ticklish area of Berlin. And it's serious enough, heaven knows, what with the Russians pushing and shoving and the natives putting on their own type squeeze. But, at least, Charles Brackett and Billy Wilder have been happily disinclined to wax morose about the problems presented by occupation—and by "fraternization," specifically. Rather these two bright filmmakers have been wryly disposed to smile upon the conflicts in self and national interests which proximities inevitably provoke. ... Particularly, their interest is in how human beings behave when confronted by other human beings—especially those of the opposite sex. And their logical conclusion is that, granted attractions back and forth, most people—despite regulations and even differences in language and politics—are likely to do toward one another that which comes naturally.

Edwin Schallert of the Los Angeles Times wrote: "A Foreign Affair can take a terrific bow for mixing politics, romance and postwar intrigue. This comedy, with dramatic overtones ... is the best topical film show that has arrived in months." In The Nation in 1948, critic James Agee wrote, "Brackett and Wilder again, this time in American Berlin ... Some sharp, nasty, funny stuff at the expense of investigatory Americans; then—as in The Emperor Waltz—the picture indorses everything it has been kidding, and worse. A good bit of it is in rotten taste, and the perfection of that is in Dietrich's song Black Market."

== Awards ==
Charles Lang was nominated for the Academy Award for Best Black-and-White Cinematography, but lost to William H. Daniels for The Naked City. Billy Wilder, Charles Brackett and Richard L. Breen were nominated for the Academy Award for Best Adapted Screenplay but lost to John Huston for The Treasure of the Sierra Madre, and the Writers Guild of America Award, which was won by Frank Partos and Millen Brand for The Snake Pit.

== Home media ==
A Foreign Affair has been released in various home-video formats. On November 27, 2006, the film was released as part of the 18-film Marlene Dietrich: The Movie Collection for the UK market. However, in April 2007, Dietrich's estate obtained an injunction that forced Universal Pictures to withdraw the DVD set because of an alleged contract breach.

In 2012, Universal, through TCM, released the two-DVD set Directed by Billy Wilder featuring Five Graves to Cairo and A Foreign Affair.

On August 25, 2019, A Foreign Affair was released on Blu-ray by Kino Lorber.

== Bibliography ==
- Smedley, Nick (2011). A Divided World: Hollywood Cinema and Emigré Directors in the Era of Roosevelt and Hitler, 1933–1948. Bristol, UK: Intellect. pp. 218–223. ISBN 978-1-84150-402-5. LCCN 2010041838.
