= Miriam Nelson (choreographer) =

American choreographer, dancer, and actress (1919–2018)

- Born: Miriam Lois Frankel; September 21, 1919; Chicago, Illinois, U.S.
- Died: August 12, 2018 (aged 98); Beverly Hills, California, U.S.
- Occupations: Choreographer, dancer, actress
- Spouses: Gene Nelson (m. 1941; div. 1956) Jack Myers (m. 1965; died 1988)

Miriam Nelson (born Miriam Lois Frankel; September 21, 1919 – August 12, 2018) was an American choreographer, dancer, and actress. She choreographed many of Hollywood's Golden Age dance routines.

== Career ==
Nelson first performed at Casa Manana in New York, where she danced with Van Johnson in the nightclub's revue. She debuted on Broadway in Sing Out the News (1938).

Nelson was a contract performer with Paramount. She debuted on Broadway in 1938, and can be seen in 1944's classic film-noir Double Indemnity as Barton Keye's secretary, and 1961's Breakfast at Tiffany's, as Harriet at Holly Golightly's party. She worked with stars like Gene Kelly, Judy Garland, Doris Day, Ingrid Bergman, Fred Astaire and Bette Davis.

== Personal life ==
Nelson was married to actor Gene Nelson from 1941 to 1956. In 2009, she published a biography, My Life Dancing with the Stars. She died on August 12, 2018, at the age of 98.

== Filmography ==
- Let's Face It (1943) as dancer
- Lady in the Dark (1944) as dancer
- Cover Girl (1944) as specialty dancer
- Double Indemnity (1944) as Keye's secretary
- Hail the Conquering Hero (1945) as tap dancer
- Duffy's Tavern (1945) as dancer
- Kitty (1945) as girl with St. Leger
- Masquerade in Mexico (1938) as party guest
- Breakfast at Tiffany's (1961) as Harriet

== Television credits ==
- Father Knows Best (1959) as Miss Harris (1 episode)
- Pete Kelly's Blues (1959) as Thelma Reegan (1 episode)
- The Untouchables (1959) as Grace Halloran (1 episode)
- Bronco (1960) as Emmy Coles (1 episode)
- U.S. Marshal (1960) as Polly Gregory (1 episode)
- Westinghouse Playhouse (1961) as Miriam (1 episode)
- Death Valley Days (1961) as Mrs. Clayton (1 episode)
- Mister Ed (1962) as Miss Canfield (1 episode)
- The Lucy Show (1965) as Miriam (1 episode)
- Mrs. Columbo (1979) as ballet instructor (1 episode)
