= Bride of Vengeance =

1949 film

- Directed by: Mitchell Leisen
- Written by: Michael Hogan; Cyril Hume; Clemence Dane
- Produced by: Richard Maibaum
- Starring: Paulette Goddard; John Lund; Macdonald Carey
- Cinematography: Daniel L. Fapp
- Edited by: Alma Macrorie
- Music by: Hugo Friedhofer
- Production company: Paramount Pictures
- Distributed by: Paramount Pictures
- Release date: April 7, 1949
- Running time: 92 minutes
- Country: United States
- Language: English

Bride of Vengeance is a 1949 American historical drama film directed by Mitchell Leisen and starring Paulette Goddard, John Lund and Macdonald Carey. Produced and distributed by Paramount Pictures, it is set in the Italian Renaissance era. Ray Milland was originally cast in the film but refused the assignment, leading the studio to suspend him for ten weeks.

== Plot ==
Lucrezia Borgia's brother Cesare Borgia has her second husband Prince Bisceglie killed in order to marry her to Alfonso I d'Este, Duke of Ferrara, whose well-defended lands lay between the Borgia's Papal States and Venice, which Cesare wants to conquer. Cesare ensures Lucretia blames Alfonso for the murder and, encouraged by Cesare, she plots deadly revenge against her new husband. When the poison she gives him is counter-acted, and she realizes Cesare really killed her second husband, she returns to help Alfonso defend Ferrara against Cesare's army.

Cesare retreats, killing Michellotto, who wanted to continue the fight. In the final scene, the couple drink to their love.

== Cast ==
- Paulette Goddard as Lucrezia Borgia
- John Lund as Alfonso I d'Este, Duke of Ferrara
- Macdonald Carey as Cesare Borgia
- Albert Dekker as Vanetti
- John Sutton as Prince Bisceglie
- Raymond Burr as Michelotto
- Donald Randolph as Tiziano
- Charles Dayton as Bastino
- Anthony Caruso as Captain of the Guard
- Dick Foote as Negligent Sentry
- William Farnum as Conti Peruzzi
- Kate Drain Lawson as Gemma
- Nicholas Joy as Chamberlain
- Fritz Leiber as Filippo
- Rose Hobart as Lady Eleanora
- Douglas Spencer as False Physician
- Nestor Paiva as Mayor
- Frank Puglia as Bolfi
- Houseley Stevenson as Councillor
- Robert Greig as Councillor
- Don Beddoe as Councillor
- Billy Gilbert as Beppo

== Reception ==
In a review for Los Angeles Times, Philip K. Scheuer wrote that "These people [...] are not kidding the parts and they are not fooling themselves; they are too smart for that. They know they have a dud and they are stuck with it--but as a last resort they are trying to put it over to the audience for whatever that audience may read into it--satire, history, melodrama or just a chance to get off its feet for an hour and half. On that last account 'Bride of Vengeance' probably qualifies. It is better than looking at a blank wall".

Bosley Crowther of New York Times wrote that "Miss Goddard plays Lucretia as a grand-dame right out of a wardrobe room, with the suavity and voluptuousness of a model in a display of lingerie" and "[a]s Alfonso, addressed as 'Magnificence,' John Lund gives a fair picture of a nice American prankster got up for a fancy-dress ball," concluding the review with "Bride of Vengeance is an obvious masquerade".

John M. Coppinger's review in The Washington Post stated that it was "simple, sheer, unadorned escapist stuff. As a work of art, it makes no pretensions. It's a lavish spectacle of hokum... No attempt has been made at accuracy in the presentation of this historical romance". Coppinger wrote that director Leisen "has gotten much comedy in a film which could easily have turned out to be a flop".

Costuming (by Mary Grant) was given as the film's chief strength by Mae Tinee in a review for Chicago Daily Tribune.

== Bibliography ==
- McKay, James. Ray Milland: The Films, 1929-1984. McFarland, 2020.
