= Hold Back the Dawn =

1941 film by Mitchell Leisen

- Theatrical release poster
- Directed by: Mitchell Leisen
- Written by: Charles Brackett; Billy Wilder; Richard Maibaum; Manuel Reachi
- Based on: Hold Back the Dawn; 1940 novel by Ketti Frings
- Produced by: Arthur Hornblow Jr.
- Starring: Charles Boyer; Olivia de Havilland; Paulette Goddard
- Narrated by: Charles Boyer
- Cinematography: Leo Tover
- Edited by: Doane Harrison
- Music by: Victor Young
- Production company: Paramount Pictures
- Distributed by: Paramount Pictures
- Release date: September 26, 1941
- Running time: 116 minutes
- Country: United States
- Language: English

Hold Back the Dawn is a 1941 American romantic drama film directed by Mitchell Leisen, in which a Romanian gigolo marries an American woman in Mexico in order to gain entry to the United States, but winds up falling in love with her. It stars Charles Boyer, Olivia de Havilland, Paulette Goddard, Victor Francen, Walter Abel, Curt Bois, Rosemary DeCamp, and an uncredited Veronica Lake.

The movie was adapted by Charles Brackett and Billy Wilder from the 1940 novel by Ketti Frings.

It was nominated for Academy Awards for Best Picture, Best Actress in a Leading Role (Olivia de Havilland), Best Writing, Screenplay, Best Art Direction-Interior Decoration, Black-and-White, Best Cinematography, Black-and-White, and Best Music, Scoring of a Dramatic Picture.

== Plot ==
The story opens with Georges Iscovescu recounting his story to a Hollywood film director at Paramount in an effort to earn some quick cash. Georges is a Romanian-born gigolo who has arrived in a Mexican border town seeking entry to the US. He has to endure a waiting period of up to eight years in order to obtain a quota number, living with other hopeful immigrants in the Esperanza Hotel. After six months he is broke and unhappy. When he runs into his former dancing partner, Anita Dixon, she explains how she quickly obtained US citizenship by marrying an American, who she then, just as quickly, divorced.

Georges resolves on the same plan. He soon targets visiting school teacher Miss Emmy Brown who is in Mexico on a day trip with her class of about fifteen young boys. Georges manages to extend the time necessary to repair her broken-down automobile. Emmy and her pupils sleep in the lobby of the full-up Esperanza Hotel. This provides Georges the opportunity to quickly and intensively woo Emmy in the early morning hours; she awakens to him sitting nearby and gazing at her lovingly. By claiming she is the exact image of the lost love of his life, his seemingly intense ardor toward a stranger is plausible, and they marry later that same day. However, Georges must wait some weeks before entering the US, and Emmy returns home with the boys.

A few days later, Emmy unexpectedly returns, complicating Georges' plans. Immigration inspector Hammock also appears, hunting for con artists such as Georges, and necessitating Georges' and an unwitting Emmy's departure. He drives all night, arriving at dawn in a small village. They participate in a festival of traditional blessings for newlyweds, an event that Emmy assumes has been Georges' destination all along. Georges had not planned on consummating the marriage, believing that he could return her to her small town essentially unchanged by the marriage, and fakes a shoulder injury. However, as the trip continues, he is surprised and increasingly enchanted by Emmy. When they stop at the seaside, Emmy bathes in the cool green water and Georges is unable to resist having sex with her.

However, this jeopardizes Anita's plan for her and Georges to meet in New York and work together, to which he had agreed. Anita has long been in love with Georges, and on their return, brutally informs Emmy of the entire scheme reciting the inscription on Emmy's wedding ring, which Georges' said was his mother's. Hammock then asks Emmy to verify the legitimacy of her marriage; she does not turn him in, partially blaming her own naiveté, but nevertheless leaves him. Returning to the US, she drives distractedly, in anguish at Georges' betrayal. When a black lace veil Georges had bought her is blown into her face, she is seriously injured in a car accident.

When Georges learns of this, he immediately crosses the border, jeopardizing his visa to go to her. On hearing his voice, she awakens; seeing him, her misery is relieved and her breathing and heartbeat normalize as he sits with her for hours. However, Hammock is still on his tail, and, when Georges sees police arriving, he takes off. He heads to Paramount to try to sell his story to director Dwight Saxon, in order to get the money for Emmy's care. Hammock catches up with him and returns him to Mexico.

Some weeks later, Hammock returns to the border town. Anita has a new sugar daddy. Georges has unsurprisingly not heard from Emmy, and believes the worst, sitting dejectedly on a bench writing notes in the sand. Hammock joins him, and tells Georges that he didn't report the illegal entry – Georges' visa has been approved. Georges looks up to see Emmy, in a beautiful hat, happily waving to him in the sun from across the border. He crosses, and they depart.

== Cast ==
- Charles Boyer as Georges Iscovescu
- Olivia de Havilland as Emmy Brown
- Paulette Goddard as Anita Dixon
- Victor Francen as Van Den Luecken
- Walter Abel as Inspector Hammock
- Curt Bois as Bonbois
- Rosemary DeCamp as Berta Kurz
- Eric Feldary as Josef Kurz
- Nestor Paiva as Red Flores
- Eva Puig as Lupita
- Micheline Cheirel as Christine
- Madeleine Lebeau as Annie
- Billy Lee as Tony
- Mikhail Rasumny as Car Mechanic
- Charles Arnt as Mr. John MacAdams
- Arthur Loft as Mr. Elvestad
- Mitchell Leisen as Mr. Saxon
- Veronica Lake Movie actress on phone at beginning of film

== Adaptations to other media ==
Hold Back the Dawn was adapted as a radio play on the November 10, 1941 episode of Lux Radio Theater with Charles Boyer, Paulette Goddard and Susan Hayward, again on the February 8, 1943 episode of The Screen Guild Theater with Charles Boyer and Susan Hayward, the July 31, 1946 episode of Academy Award Theater starring Olivia de Havilland and Jean Pierre Aumont, the May 31, 1948 episode of Screen Guild Theater with Charles Boyer and Ida Lupino, the May 14, 1949 episode of Screen Director's Playhouse with Boyer and Vanessa Brown, the May 4, 1950 episode of Screen Guild Theater with de Havilland and Boyer and the June 15, 1952 Screen Guild Theater with Barbara Stanwyck and Jean Pierre Aumont.

It was presented on Broadway Playhouse January 14, 1953, with Joseph Cotten starring.

== Release ==
Hold Back the Dawn was released on Blu-ray disc in the United Kingdom through Arrow Films on July 16, 2019.

== Reception ==
On review aggregator website Rotten Tomatoes, Hold Back the Dawn has an approval rating of fresh 100 percent based on 7 critics, with an average rating of 8.40 out of 10.

Variety commented that "While Hold Back the Dawn is basically another European refugee yarn, scenarists Charles Brackett and Billy Wilder exercised some ingenuity and imagination and Ketti Frings' original emerges as fine celluloidia".

Bosley Crowther of The New York Times wrote "You will enjoy it as a straight-away romance, crowded with most engaging characters and smoking with Mr. Boyer's charm".

== See also ==
- Green Card (later film with a similar theme)
