= John Lund (actor) =

American actor (1911–1992)

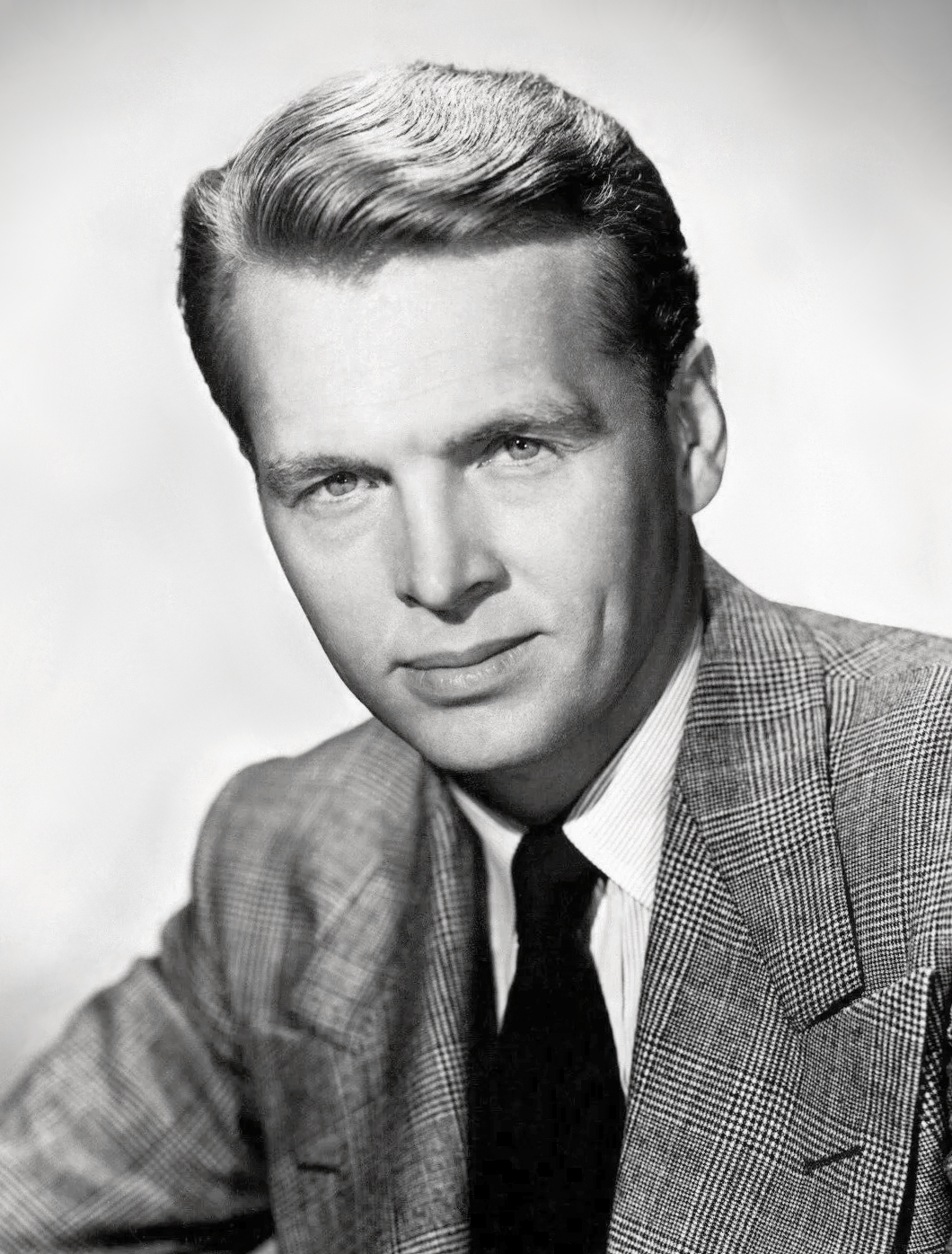
- Lund in 1951
- Born: February 6, 1911; Ithaca, New York, US
- Died: May 10, 1992 (aged 81); Los Angeles, California, US
- Years active: 1938–1962
- Spouse: Marie Lund (m. 1942; died 1982)

John Lund (February 6, 1911 – May 10, 1992) was an American film, stage, and radio actor who is probably best remembered for his role in the film A Foreign Affair (1948) and a dual role in To Each His Own (1946).

According to one obituary, his "film career was cut to a familiar pattern: the young actor imported to Hollywood after a big success on Broadway begins by playing the handsome guy who gets the girl, then descends by gradual degrees to being the male lead in minor westerns and occasionally, in major films, being the handsome guy who does not get the girl because he lacks the spark of the hero who does."

== Early life ==
John Lund's father, Edward M. Lund, was a Norwegian immigrant and glassblower in Rochester, New York. His mother, Rose A. Mooney, was born in Columbus, Ohio. Lund did not finish high school, and he tried several businesses before settling on advertising in the 1930s. His jobs included being "a soda-jerk, carpenter and timekeeper".

== Career ==
=== Stage ===
While working for an advertising agency, he was asked by a friend to appear in an industrial show for the 1939 World's Fair. As a result, he served as stage manager of Railroad on Parade at the fair and played several roles in the production. Before moving to New York City, he had appeared in several amateur productions in Rochester.

He began acting professionally by appearing on Broadway in a production of William Shakespeare's As You Like It (1941) alongside Alfred Drake.

He wrote the book and lyrics for Broadway's New Faces of 1943, as well as appearing in the production. That same year, he performed as O'Connor in Early to Bed at the Broadhurst Theatre.

His work as Yank in the play The Hasty Heart (1945) got him recognized by Hollywood and led to a long-term film contract with Paramount Pictures.

=== Radio ===
Lund had the title role in the serial Chaplain Jim on the Blue Network in the early 1940s. Lund also played Johnny Dollar in the radio show Yours Truly, Johnny Dollar, taking over from 1952 until 1954.

=== Film ===
Lund was vice president of the Screen Actors Guild from 1950 to 1959.

==== Paramount ====
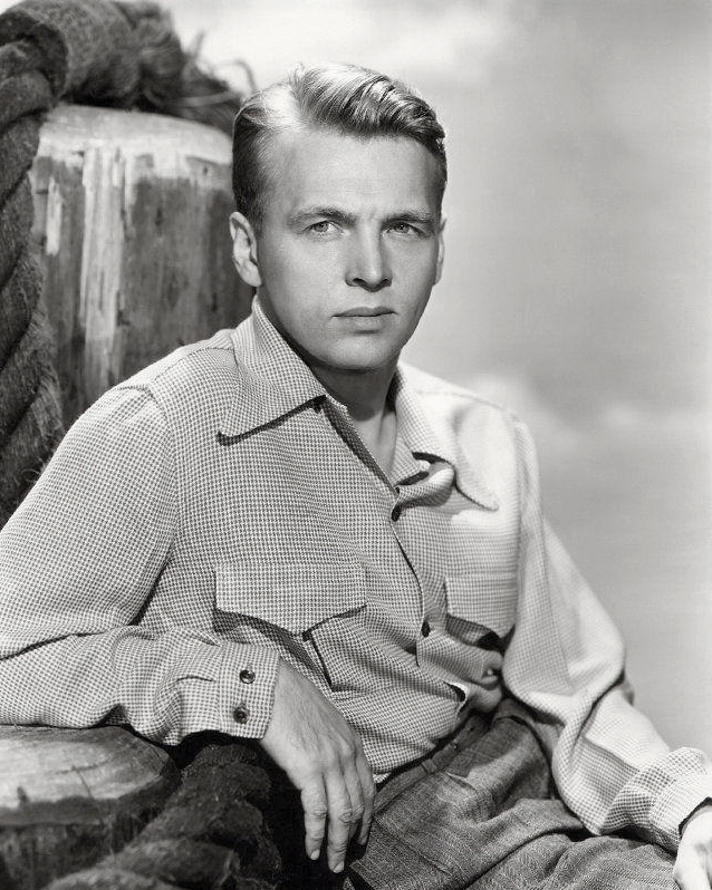
John Lund (1945)

Lund's first film had him as star To Each His Own (1946) with Olivia de Havilland for Paramount, in which he played dual roles. It was written and produced by Charles Brackett and was critically and commercially successful.

Paramount cast Lund as Betty Hutton's leading man in The Perils of Pauline (1947), another hit. He was one of many Paramount stars who made cameos in Variety Girl (1947). In the Billy Wilder film A Foreign Affair (1948), Lund was a romantic lead for Marlene Dietrich and Jean Arthur.

He supported Edward G. Robinson in Night Has a Thousand Eyes (1948). Brackett gave him the lead in a comedy Miss Tatlock's Millions (1948). He played Alfonso I d'Este, Duke of Ferrara, in Bride of Vengeance (1949) alongside Paulette Goddard and MacDonald Carey, following the suspension of Ray Milland; the film was largely ill-received by critics.

Hal Wallis used him in My Friend Irma (1949) as Al, Irma's (Marie Wilson) boyfriend. The film is remembered, however, for introducing Martin and Lewis (Jerry Lewis had meant to play the role of Al, but realized he was miscast).

He supported Barbara Stanwyck in No Man of Her Own (1950) and reprised his performance as Al in My Friend Irma Goes West (1950). Paramount announced Union Station for him, but William Holden ended up playing it.

Lund played the false love interest in Duchess of Idaho (1950) for MGM; the film featured Esther Williams and Van Johnson in the leads.

Brackett gave him another good role in The Mating Season (1951), alongside Gene Tierney, Miriam Hopkins, and Thelma Ritter. He was Joan Fontaine's leading man in Darling, How Could You! (1951).

Paramount wanted to lend him to Universal for Week-End with Father, but he refused and was put on suspension.

==== Universal ====
Lund left Paramount for Universal, where he was Ann Sheridan's leading man in Steel Town (1952), replacing Jeff Chandler.

He co-starred with Chandler in The Battle at Apache Pass (1952) and Scott Brady in Bronco Buster (1952), then was reunited with Sheridan in Just Across the Street (1952).

==== Republic ====
He was top-billed in Woman They Almost Lynched (1953), a Western.

Lund played another false love interest at MGM Latin Lovers (1953) with Lana Turner.

He made a series of Westerns: White Feather (1955), at Fox, second-billed to Robert Wagner; Five Guns West (1955), the first film directed by Roger Corman, at ARC; Chief Crazy Horse (1955) with Victor Mature at Universal; and Dakota Incident (1956) with Linda Darnell at Republic.

Around this time, he was also in a war film at Columbia, Battle Stations (1956), and he played Grace Kelly's fiancé George in MGM's High Society, the musical remake of The Philadelphia Story.

He was top-billed in Affair in Reno (1957) for Republic. His last performances included support performances in The Wackiest Ship in the Army (1960) at Columbia and If a Man Answers (1962) at Universal.

== Personal life ==
Lund was married to Marie Charton, who was an actress and a model.

== Later years ==
Lund retired from acting in 1962 to his home in Coldwater Canyon. He died from a heart condition in 1992.

== Partial filmography ==
- 1946: To Each His Own – Captain Bart Cosgrove / Gregory Pierson
- 1947: The Perils of Pauline – Michael Farrington
- 1947: Variety Girl – Himself
- 1948: A Foreign Affair – Captain John Pringle
- 1948: Night Has a Thousand Eyes – Elliott Carson
- 1948: Miss Tatlock's Millions – Tim Burke posing as Schuyler Tatlock
- 1949: Bride of Vengeance – Alfonso D'Este
- 1949: My Friend Irma – Al
- 1950: No Man of Her Own – Bill Harkness
- 1950: My Friend Irma Goes West – Al
- 1950: Duchess of Idaho – Douglas J. Morrison Jr.
- 1951: The Mating Season – Val McNulty
- 1951: Darling, How Could You! – Dr. Robert Grey
- 1952: Steel Town – Steve Kostane
- 1952: The Battle at Apache Pass – Maj. Jim Colton
- 1952: Bronco Buster – Tom Moody
- 1952: Just Across the Street – Fred Newcombe
- 1953: Woman They Almost Lynched – Lance Horton
- 1953: Latin Lovers – Paul Chevron
- 1955: White Feather – Col. Lindsay
- 1955: Five Guns West – Govern Sturges
- 1955: Chief Crazy Horse – Maj. Twist
- 1956: Battle Stations – Father Joseph McIntyre
- 1956: High Society – George Kittredge
- 1956: Dakota Incident – John Carter (aka Hamilton)
- 1957: Affair in Reno – Bill Carter
- 1960: The Wackiest Ship in the Army – Lt. Cmdr. Wilbur F. Vandewater
- 1962: If a Man Answers – John Stacy (final film role)

== Broadway appearances ==
- As You Like It (October 20, 1941 – October 25, 1941) in the ensemble cast
- New Faces of 1943 (December 22, 1942 – March 13, 1943) as various roles; writer of the book and lyrics
- Early to Bed (June 17, 1943 – May 13, 1944) as O'Connor
- The Hasty Heart (January 3, 1945 – June 30, 1945) as Yank

== Partial radio appearances ==
Year	Program	Episode/source
1946	Hollywood Star Time	The Lady Eve
1946	Suspense	"A Plane Case of Murder"
1952	Screen Guild Theatre	The Mating of Millie
1952	Hollywood Star Playhouse	The Word
1953	Lux Radio Theatre	Lady in the Dark
1953	Theatre Guild on the Air	O'Halloran's Luck''
1953	Broadway Playhouse	Salty O'Rourke
1958	Suspense	Old Time's Sake
