= Hal Erickson (author) =

American historian (born 1950)

- Born: Harold Erickson; 1950 (age 75–76); Cincinnati, Ohio, U.S.
- Education: University of Wisconsin-Milwaukee; University of North Carolina at Chapel Hill
- Writing career
- Genres: Media historian, editor

Harold "Hal" Erickson (born 1950) is an American media historian who was a senior editor at AllRovi for 15 years starting in 1994 when it was known as "All Movies".

== Biography ==
He received a bachelor's degree in acting and directing from the University of Wisconsin–Milwaukee and a master's degree in theater history at the University of North Carolina at Chapel Hill. He has also written several books relating to the history of movies and television as well as many media articles for Encyclopædia Britannica. He lives in Milwaukee, Wisconsin.

== Books ==
- Any Resemblance to Actual Persons: The Real People Behind 400+ Fictional Movie Characters. McFarland & Co. 2017. ISBN 9781476629308. OCLC 1041034425.
- Television Cartoon Shows: An Illustrated Encyclopedia, 1949 through 2003 (2 ed.). McFarland & Co. 2016. ISBN 9781476665993. OCLC 995238613.
- Military Comedy Films: a Critical Survey and Filmography of Hollywood Releases since 1918, Jefferson, N.C.: McFarland & Co. Publishers, 2012, ISBN 978-0-7864-6290-2
- The Baseball Filmography, 1915 through 2001, Jefferson, N.C. : McFarland, 2002, ISBN 0-7864-1272-0
- Encyclopedia of Television Law Shows: Factual and Fictional Series About Judges, Lawyers and the Courtroom, 1948-2008, Jefferson, N.C.: McFarland, 2009, ISBN 0-7864-3828-2
- "From Beautiful Downtown Burbank": a Critical History of Rowan & Martin's Laugh-In, 1968-1973, Jefferson, N.C.: McFarland & Co., 2009, ISBN 0-7864-4049-X
- Sid and Marty Krofft: a Critical Study of Saturday Morning Children's Television, 1969-1993, Jefferson, N.C.: McFarland, 2007, ISBN 0-7864-3093-1
- Religious Radio and Television in the United States, 1921-1991: the Programs and Personalities, Jefferson, N.C.: McFarland, 1992, ISBN 0-89950-658-5
- Baseball in the Movies: a Comprehensive Reference, 1915-1991, Jefferson, N.C.: McFarland, 1992, ISBN 0-89950-657-7
- Syndicated Television: the First Forty Years, 1947-1987, Jefferson, N.C.: McFarland, 1989, ISBN 0-89950-410-8
