= Charles Brackett =

American screenwriter and film producer (1892–1969)

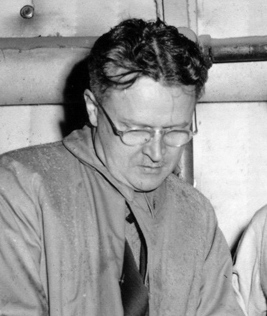
- Brackett in 1942
- Born: November 26, 1892; Saratoga Springs, New York, U.S.
- Died: March 9, 1969 (aged 76); Beverly Hills, California, U.S.
- Education: Williams College
- Occupations: Screenwriter, producer
- Years active: 1925–1962
- Spouses: Elizabeth Fletcher (m. 1919; died 1948) Lillian Fletcher (m. 1953)
- Children: 2

Charles William Brackett (November 26, 1892 – March 9, 1969) was an American screenwriter and film producer. He collaborated with Billy Wilder on sixteen films.

== Life and career ==
Brackett was born in Saratoga Springs, New York, the son of Mary Emma Corliss and New York State Senator, lawyer, and banker Edgar Truman Brackett. The family's roots traced back to the arrival of Richard Brackett in the Massachusetts Bay Colony in 1629. His mother's uncle, George Henry Corliss, built the Centennial Engine that powered the 1876 Centennial Exposition in Philadelphia. A 1915 graduate of Williams College, he earned his law degree from Harvard University. He joined the Allied Expeditionary Force during World War I, and was awarded the French Medal of Honor.

He was a frequent contributor to the Saturday Evening Post, Collier's, and Vanity Fair, and a drama critic for The New Yorker. He wrote five novels: The Counsel of the Ungodly (1920), Week-End (1925), That Last Infirmity (1926), American Colony (1929), and Entirely Surrounded (1934).

Brackett was a president of the Screen Writers Guild (1938–1939) and for the Academy of Motion Picture Arts and Sciences (1949–1955). He either wrote and/or produced over forty films, including To Each His Own, Ninotchka, The Major and the Minor, The Mating Season (1951), Niagara, The King and I, Ten North Frederick, The Remarkable Mr. Pennypacker and Blue Denim.

Beginning in August 1936, Brackett worked with Billy Wilder, writing the film classics The Lost Weekend and Sunset Boulevard, both of which won Academy Awards for their respective screenplays. Brackett described their collaboration process as follows: "The thing to do was suggest an idea, have it torn apart and despised. In a few days it would be apt to turn up, slightly changed, as Wilder's idea. Once I got adjusted to that way of working, our lives were simpler."

His partnership with Wilder ended in 1950 and Brackett went to work at 20th Century-Fox as a screenwriter and producer. His script for Titanic (1953) won him another Academy Award.

He received an Honorary Oscar for Lifetime Achievement in 1958.

Brackett died on March 9, 1969. His diaries covering his screenwriting and social life from 1932 to 1949 were edited by Anthony Slide into Slide's book It's the Pictures That Got Small: Charles Brackett on Billy Wilder and Hollywood's Golden Age.

== Personal life ==
Brackett married Elizabeth Barrows Fletcher in 1919. They had two daughters, Alexandra Corliss Brackett and Elizabeth Fletcher Brackett. His wife died in 1948, and in 1953, Brackett married Lillian Fletcher, her sister. They had no children.

Brackett was a Republican who voted for Alf Landon in 1936 and supported Barry Goldwater in the 1964 United States presidential election.

== Works ==
- Brackett, Charles (December 16, 2014). Slide, Anthony (ed.). "It's the Pictures That Got Small": Charles Brackett on Billy Wilder and Hollywood's Golden Age. Columbia University Press. doi:10.7312/slid16708. ISBN 9780231167086. JSTOR 10.7312/slid16708.

== Partial filmography ==
- Tomorrow's Love (1925) – based on a story Interlocutory
- Risky Business (1926) – based on a story Pearls Before Cecily
- Pointed Heels (1929) – based on a story
- Secrets of a Secretary (1931) – based on a story
- College Scandal (1935) – writer
- Without Regret (1935) – writer
- The Last Outpost (1935) – writer
- Rose of the Rancho (1936) – writer
- Woman Trap (1936) – writer
- Piccadilly Jim (1936) – writer
- Live, Love and Learn (1937) – writer
- Bluebeard's Eighth Wife (1938)* – writer
- What a Life (1939)* – writer
- Ninotchka (1939)* – writer
- Arise, My Love (1940)* – writer
- Hold Back the Dawn (1941)* – writer
- Ball of Fire (1941)* – writer
- The Major and the Minor (1942)* – writer
- Five Graves to Cairo (1943)* – writer, producer
- The Uninvited (1944) – producer
- The Lost Weekend (1945)* – producer, writer
- To Each His Own (1946) – writer, producer
- The Bishop's Wife (1947) – uncredited writer
- A Foreign Affair (1948)* – writer, producer
- The Emperor Waltz (1948)* – writer, producer
- Miss Tatlock's Millions (1948) – writer, producer
- Sunset Boulevard (1950)* – writer, producer
- Edge of Doom (1950) – writer (uncredited)
- The Mating Season (1951) – writer, producer
- The Model and the Marriage Broker (1951) – writer, producer
- Niagara (1953) – writer, producer
- Titanic (1953) – writer, producer
- Woman's World (1954) – producer
- Garden of Evil (1954) – producer
- The Virgin Queen (1955) – producer
- The Girl in the Red Velvet Swing (1955) – writer, producer
- Teenage Rebel (1956) – writer, producer
- The King and I (1956) – producer
- D-Day the Sixth of June (1956) – producer
- The Wayward Bus (1957) – producer
- The Gift of Love (1958) – producer
- Ten North Frederick (1958) – producer
- The Remarkable Mr. Pennypacker (1959) – producer
- Blue Denim (1959) – producer
- Journey to the Center of the Earth (1959) – writer, producer
- High Time (1960) – producer
- State Fair (1962) – producer

("*" indicates collaboration with Wilder)

== Awards and nominations ==
=== Academy Awards ===
Year	Category	Film	Result	Shared with
1939	Best Adapted Screenplay	Ninotchka	Nominated	Billy Wilder & Walter Reisch
1941	Best Adapted Screenplay	Hold Back the Dawn	Nominated	Billy Wilder
1945	Best Picture	The Lost Weekend	Won	—N/a
1945	Best Adapted Screenplay	The Lost Weekend	Won	Billy Wilder
1946	Best Story	To Each His Own	Nominated	
1948	Best Adapted Screenplay	A Foreign Affair	Nominated	Billy Wilder & Richard L. Breen
1950	Best Picture	Sunset Boulevard	Nominated	—N/a
1950	Best Original Screenplay	Sunset Boulevard	Won	Billy Wilder & D. M. Marshman Jr.
1953	Best Original Screenplay	Titanic	Won	Richard L. Breen & Walter Reisch
1956	Best Picture	The King and I	Nominated	—N/a
1957	Honorary Award	—N/a	Won	—N/a

Non-profit organization positions
Preceded by Jean Hersholt	President of Academy of Motion Pictures, Arts and Sciences; 1949–1955	Succeeded by George Seaton
