= Lisa the Tree Hugger =

- The Simpsons episode
- Episode no.: Season 12; Episode 4
- Directed by: Steven Dean Moore
- Written by: Matt Selman
- Production code: CABF01
- Original air date: November 19, 2000

Guest appearance
- Joshua Jackson as Jesse Grass

Episode features
- Chalkboard gag: "I am not the acting President"
- Couch gag: Maggie is on the couch. The rest of the Simpsons waddle in dressed as Teletubbies and Maggie applauds with delight.
- Commentary: Mike Scully; Ian Maxtone-Graham; Matt Selman; Tom Gammill; Tim Long; Don Payne; Yeardley Smith; Steven Dean Moore

Episode chronology
← Previous "Insane Clown Poppy"	Next → "Homer vs. Dignity"
- The Simpsons season 12

"Lisa the Tree Hugger" is the fourth episode of the twelfth season of the American animated television series The Simpsons. It originally aired on the Fox network in the United States on November 19, 2000. In the episode, Lisa falls in love with the leader of a radical environmentalist group and tries to impress him by living in Springfield's oldest tree in order to keep it from being cut down. The episode is based on the story of the American tree sitter Julia Butterfly Hill. Actor Joshua Jackson guest-starred in the episode as Jesse.

== Plot ==
Bart, needing money for the new video game console Gamestation 256, takes a job hanging menus on doors for a Thai restaurant. Lisa is concerned that the menus are wasting paper and hurting the environment, but the family ignores her worries. On a trip to Krusty Burger to celebrate Bart's new job, they see a group of protesters in cow costumes standing on the roof of the restaurant, accusing the company of illegal deforestation. The police arrive and shoot the protesters with bean bag rounds. As the protesters are being arrested, Lisa meets their leader—radical environmentalist Jesse Grass—and is instantly smitten with him.

Lisa visits Jesse in jail, but she feels intimidated when she sees that he is more dedicated to environmentalism than she is. She attends a meeting of Jesse's activist group and learns that one of Springfield's oldest trees has been secretly auctioned off to the Rich Texan. Jesse asks if anyone in the group would be willing to live in the tree to prevent its destruction, and Lisa volunteers, hoping to impress him. She climbs the tree and sets up camp for a few days, after which she begins to miss her family. She eventually sneaks away from the tree at night and goes home to see them, but finds them asleep, so she lies down with them and accidentally falls asleep herself.

The next day, the local news reveals that the tree was felled by lightning overnight, Lisa is presumed dead, and the Texan will dedicate the surrounding forest as a nature preserve in her honor. Lisa hears this and, despite Marge's objections, chooses not to reveal that she is alive, while Homer and Bart readily exploit the sympathy of the townspeople. However, when the Texan changes his mind and begins turning the forest into an amusement park called "Lisa Land", Lisa angrily reveals herself in an attempt to stop him. Jesse also protests by taking out the supports for the destroyed tree, which has been logged and turned into a "Lisa Land" sign; the log slides down the hill and into downtown Springfield where it devastates multiple buildings, for which Jesse is jailed once again.

The epilogue, set to a parody of "This Land is Your Land" called "This Log is Your Log", shows the log continuing to slide across the country, passing Mount Rushmore and ultimately reaching the coast of San Francisco, where it then heads out to the Pacific Ocean.

== Production and analysis ==
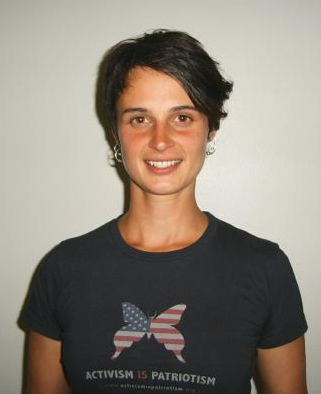
Julia Butterfly Hill, an environmentalist who lived in a tree for more than two years to prevent it from being cut down, was the inspiration for the episode.

"Lisa the Tree Hugger" was written by Matt Selman and directed by Steven Dean Moore as part of the twelfth season of The Simpsons (2000–2001). It is based on a story Selman heard on the radio about Julia Butterfly Hill, an American activist and environmentalist who lived in a millennium-old California Redwood tree known as Luna for more than two years between 1997 and 1999 to prevent loggers from cutting it down. The character Jesse Grass was named after Selman's brother Jesse Selman, who according to Matt acts a lot like Jesse Grass. The last name came from Jesse Selman's bluegrass band named Grass. Canadian American actor Joshua Jackson guest-starred in the episode as Jesse Grass. Although guest stars most often record their lines with the cast members of the show, Jackson did not. "Lisa the Tree Hugger" originally had a different, more complicated ending compared to what is seen in the episode. The final version was added at the last minute of production.

In his 2007 book Japanamerica: How Japanese Pop Culture Has Invaded the U.S., Roland Kelts analyzed the scenes from the beginning of the episode in which Bart hangs menus on doors for a Thai restaurant. These scenes allude to the film The Matrix. Kelts wrote: "Bart needs cash to buy a Japanese game console, so he takes a job delivering flyers for a Thai restaurant. He is quickly taught martial arts so he can drop off the menus with ninja stealth. He runs sideways along walls, his actions accompanied by staccato swishing noises. At one point the scene freezes, he hangs in the air, and the 'camera' does a 360-degree pan around him. The episode dates back to 2000, a year after the look and feel of The Matrix had seeped into viewers' consciousness, and the makers of The Simpsons were very adroitly appropriating it into their shtick."

== Release and reception ==
The episode originally aired on the Fox network in the United States on November 19, 2000. On August 18, 2009, it was released on DVD as part of the box set The Simpsons – The Complete Twelfth Season. Staff members Mike Scully, Ian Maxtone-Graham, Matt Selman, Don Payne, Tom Gammill, Tim Long, Yeardley Smith, and Steven Dean Moore participated in the DVD audio commentary for the episode. Deleted scenes from the episode were also included on the box set.

Since airing, "Lisa the Tree Hugger" has received generally positive reactions from critics.

DVD Movie Guide's Colin Jacobson described it as "arguably [the season's] best show," adding: "The first act fares best, as I love Marge’s tune about saving, and 'Menu Boy' offers a clever spoof of martial arts-based action flicks. 'Hugger' hits a minor lull when Lisa becomes environmentally active, but it bounces back pretty quickly, and the scenes with the runaway log delight. 'Hugger' provides a winner."

Den of Geek critic Matt Haigh cited "Lisa the Tree Hugger" as one of the highlights of season twelve in his review of the box set.

Jon Perks of The Birmingham Post highlighted the episode in an article mentioning the twelfth season DVD, writing that like the rest of the season's episodes, "Lisa the Tree Hugger" is "sure to put a smile on anyone's face".
