= Miranda Gibson =

Australian environmentalist (born 1982)

Miranda Gibson is an Australian environmental activist and school teacher who is known for their tree sitting to save the rainforest in Southern Tasmania from logging. Their 449 days spent up the tree is the longest running tree sit in Australian history.

== Biography ==
On 14 December 2011, Gibson climbed up a 60 m (200 ft) old-growth Eucalyptus delegatensis tree, dubbed the 'Observer Tree', in the heart of Tasmania's southern rainforest. Gibson vowed to stay until the forest in the Styx Valley was protected. The area was due to be logged by a Malaysian company, Ta Ann. After three months, their blog about the experience had attracted over 50,000 views.

Gibson had a 3 m (9.8 ft) platform built at the top of the tree, and was connected to a safety harness at all times. During the sit they experienced snow, hail and gale-force winds. they used a composting toilet, which they would lower down to their support crew on the ground, and slept under a tarp. A solar-powered computer and satellite technology enabled them to write a blog and attend environmental conferences, school groups and festivals by video link. Gibson did not come down from the tree at any point during their sit, which broke the previous Australian record of 208 days, set in 1995. At the one year anniversary they was thanked by Nick Cave, John Butler, Blue King Brown, Bob Brown and Julia Butterfly Hill. Gibson had visitors on their platform during their tree sit, including their mother who stayed with them for four days.

Gibson came down from the tree in March 2013 after 449 days as a safety precaution due to a nearby bushfire. they voiced their disappointment in having to come down under those circumstances, though said they were proud of their achievement and vowed to keep fighting for Tasmania's forests. In June 2013, Tasmania's Wilderness World Heritage Area was officially extended by 170,000 hectares (420,000 acres), which included the area their tree sit had been in. Gibson said they were thrilled with the decision; they had been contemplating returning to the tree if the World Heritage space had not been extended.

Gibson is also a co-founder of Inside Out, an Australian quarterly newsletter aimed at LGBTIQ prisoners. On behalf of Inside Out, Gibson has advocated to overturn the ban on pen pal programs in Victorian prisons, and called for the release of low-risk prisoners during the COVID-19 pandemic in Australia due to the lack of adequate hygiene products, visits and rehabilitative programs available in custody at the time.
