= Robert Usher =

Art director

- Born: 27 February 1901; Missouri
- Died: 23 July 1990 (aged 89); Tehama County, California
- Occupation: Art director
- Years active: 1933-1950

Robert Beneke Usher (February 27, 1901 – July 23, 1990) was an American art director. He was nominated for three Academy Awards in the category of Best Art Direction.

== Early life ==
Usher was born in St. Louis, Missouri, and studied at the Art Institute of Chicago. In 1929, he worked briefly for United Artists, before visiting Tahiti. Upon his return in 1932, he found employment with Paramount Pictures.

== Career ==
Between 1933 and 1950, Usher worked as art director on forty-seven films. He was under contract to Paramount from 1933 to 1944, during which time he worked under Paramount's supervising art director Hans Dreier. Usher was three times nominated for an Academy Award for Best Art Direction: Arise, My Love (1940),Hold Back the Dawn (1941), and No Time for Love (1943). His first film was the popular She Done Him Wrong starring Mae West and Cary Grant.

Usher served in the US army during World War II. A number of his set design sketches are in the Robert Usher Collection at New York's Museum of Modern Art and the Smithsonian Institution.

== Later life ==
Usher spent the last twenty years of his life as a religious brother at the Abbey of New Clairvaux in Vina, California, where he designed some of the monastery's buildings and the cemetery gardens.

Around 1960, Usher offered his property "Green Pastures" in Whitethorn, California to the Cistercians. It became the site of Our Lady of the Redwoods Abbey, a monastery of Trappistine nuns.

== Selected filmography ==
- She Done Him Wrong (1933)
- Now and Forever (1934)
- Shoot the Works (1934)
- Goin' to Town (1935)
- Desire (1936)
- Bluebeard's Eighth Wife (1938)
- Midnight (1939)
- Arise, My Love (1940)
- Hold Back the Dawn (1941)
- No Time for Love (1943)
