= The Legacy of Luna =

Book by Julia Butterfly Hill

The Legacy of Luna: The Story of a Tree, a Woman, and the Struggle to Save the Redwoods
- Author: Julia Butterfly Hill
- Language: English
- Genre: Non-fiction
- Publisher: HarperSanFrancisco
- Publication date: April 1, 2000
- Publication place: United States
- Media type: Print (hardcover and paperback)
- Pages: 272 pp; 1st edition
- ISBN: 0-06-251658-2
- OCLC: 43115158
- Dewey Decimal: 333.75/16/092 B 21
- LC Class: SD129.H53 A3 2000

The Legacy of Luna is a book written by Julia Butterfly Hill about her experiences while treesitting in a tree named Luna in the late 1990s.

== Book ==
The book is based on true events and written like a diary of the two years Julia Butterfly Hill spent squatting in an ancient redwood in order to protect it. The tree had been named Luna by activists.

Hill began treesitting in December 1997 and stopped when she made a deal with the Pacific Lumber Company. In a first person narrative, Hill relates how she appealed to the universal spirit and spoke to the tree. All profits went to the Circle of Life Foundation. The book was published by HarperCollins in 2000.

== Reception ==
Publishers Weekly found her book a "a remarkable inspirational document" whilst also disparaging her "mushy New Age ruminations". Other reviews also enjoyed the first person account of events and praised Hill's activism.

== Film adaptation ==
Rachel Weisz was set to star as Hill in a film adaptation of The Legacy of Luna called Luna, directed by Deepa Mehta. She worked to get the project off the ground, but was unable to do so. She said "I've been desperately trying to get that movie together, but right now it's very hard to get money for dramas, particularly a drama with a female at the centre of it."

== See also ==
- Butterfly, a 2000 documentary film about Hill and her campaign
