= Wolens =

Wolens is a surname. Notable people with the surname include:

- Doug Wolens, American documentary filmmaker, writer, and producer
- Steven D. Wolens (born 1950), American politician
