= Our Lady of the Redwoods Abbey =

Trappistine Monastery in Whitethorn, California

Coordinates: 40°0′15.4″N 123°56′2.48″W

The Abbey of Our Lady of the Redwoods is a monastic community of the Trappistine branch of Cistercian nuns located in Whitethorn, California, within the Diocese of Santa Rosa.

== History ==
The monastery was founded by two groups of nuns from the medieval Abbey of Our Lady of Nazareth (commonly called Brecht Abbey) in Belgium in 1962, the first four arriving on the site on 1 November 1962. Noted art director Robert Usher, an extern brother of the Abbey of New Clairvaux in Vina, California had donated his house and grounds to the Cistercians.

The nuns soon settled in and established themselves; they were formally declared a new monastic community on 15 August 1963. It was established as an independent abbey the following year, and the founding Mother Superior, Mother Myriam Dardenne, O.C.S.O., was elected the community's first abbess on 21 November 1964. The abbey was dedicated on May 2, 1967, by Leo Thomas Maher, Bishop of Santa Rosa.

The nuns led the traditional Cistercian rhythm of carving out a life of contemplation in harmony with the environment around them. The setting for this monastery in the Redwood Forest of California have given this monastery a sense of place and silence. They have created various creamed honey flavors which the sisters sell online and at the monastery. This, with organic gardening and forestry, helps to support their community. There is a guesthouse with twelve rooms available for visitors who wish to share in the rhythm of their lives.

Mother Myriam led the community until 8 December 1989. The current Abbess is Mother Kathy de Vico, O.C.S.O., who was elected in 2000.

== See also ==
- Trappists
- Cistercian nuns
- Sanctuary Forest
