= University of California, Berkeley oak grove controversy =

Protest of removal of oak trees in Berkeley, California

Coordinates: 37°52′15.86″N 122°15′8.54″W

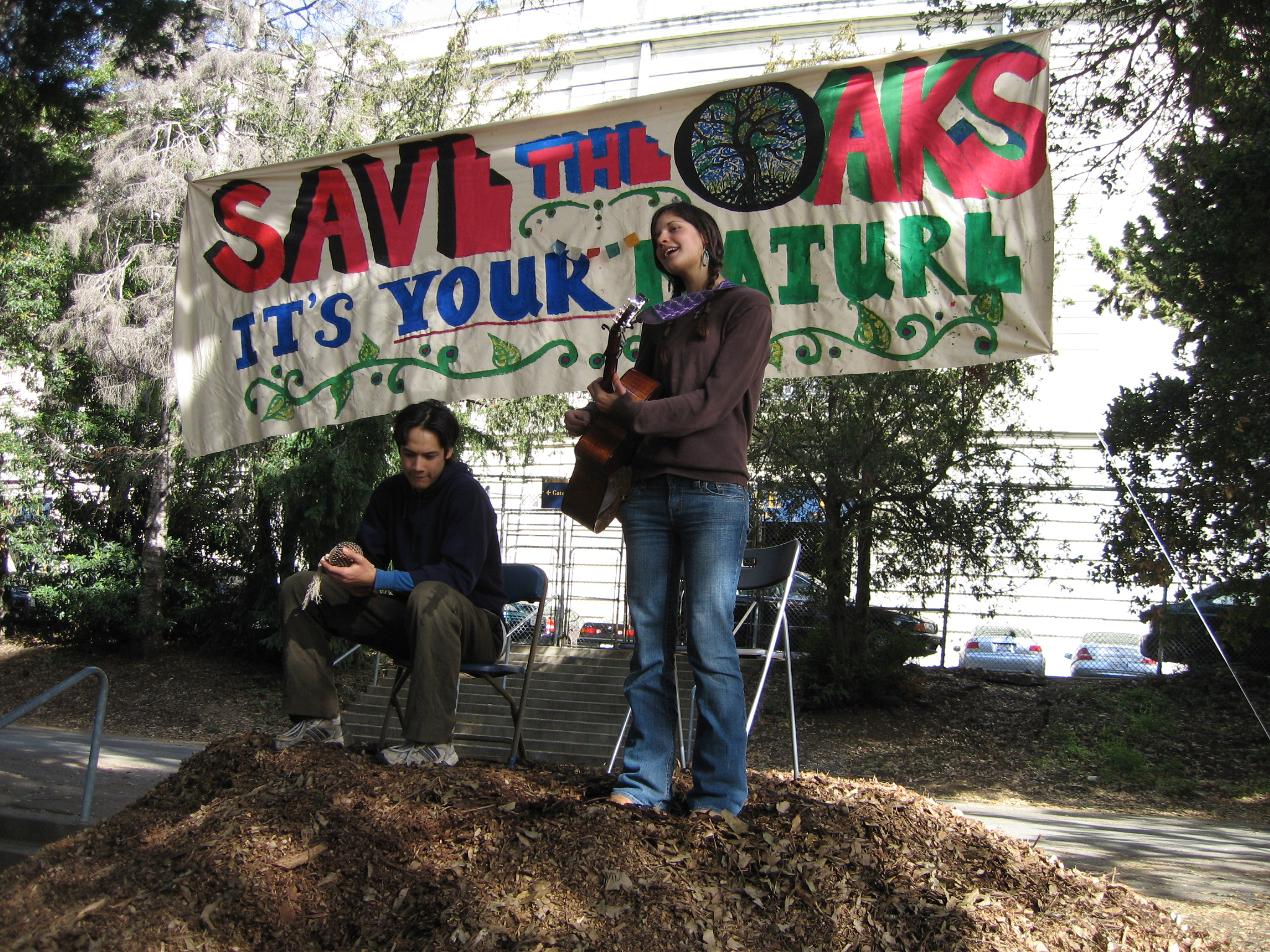
Protesters at the Save The Oaks Festival on January 20, 2007

The University of California, Berkeley oak grove controversy arose over the planned removal of a grove of oak trees in preparation for the construction of a new student athletic training center for the University of California, Berkeley. The university's actions sparked three lawsuits, as well as a tree sit-in that ran from December 2006 to September 2008, when the trees in question were finally cut down. Berkeley municipal law prohibits removing any coast live oak with a trunk larger than six inches within city boundaries, but city boundaries do not include the university and the university further claimed an exemption to the city law as a state agency.

== The grove ==
The approximate location of the Berkeley oak grove.

The oak grove sits at the base of California Memorial Stadium and at the time of the controversy consisted of about 90 trees: 65 oaks, including 38 coast live oaks, 25 pittosporum, 8 redwoods, 5 pines and 1 or 2 cypress, cedar, pepper and yew trees. Anywhere from two to five of the oaks predated the 83-year-old stadium. According to Lech Naumovich, a conservation analyst for the California Native Plant Society, "This is one of the most outstanding examples of oak woodland in an urban interface, and the last remnant of coast live oak woodland ecology in the Berkeley lowlands." Naumovich also said that the grove provided sustenance for over 300 animal species, among them squirrels, acorn woodpeckers and deer.

It is illegal to cut down mature coast live oaks in the City of Berkeley. However, the University claims an exception as its property belongs to the state and is not within the city's jurisdiction. The University claimed that most of the trees were planted in 1923 as part of a landscaping project. The university further stated that of the 44 trees slated to be cut down "only two or three predate memorial stadium."

== Training facility ==
The proposed Student Athlete High Performance Center (SAHPC) will be four stories tall, with 142,000 square feet (13,000 m^{2}) of space.

The University says the SAHPC is needed to provide safer facilities for the 350 people who work and train at California Memorial Stadium. The City of Berkeley claims that the facility will be unsafe because of its proximity to the Hayward Fault Zone, and supporters of the grove pointed out that if the University believes the stadium is currently unsafe, it should move all staff to another location immediately, and cease holding football games until the stadium is repaired.

The University claims the SAHPC will cost over $125 million, and will require the removal of dozens of coast live oaks. According to materials published by the University, funding for the SAHPC will not come from either the state or the University's regular operating budget. Instead, a separate campaign has been organized to raise the money for SAHPC from private donors.

Grove supporters asked the university to consider other locations on campus that would not require removing trees, which University administrators considered but rejected as being too far from the stadium.

== Tree-sit ==
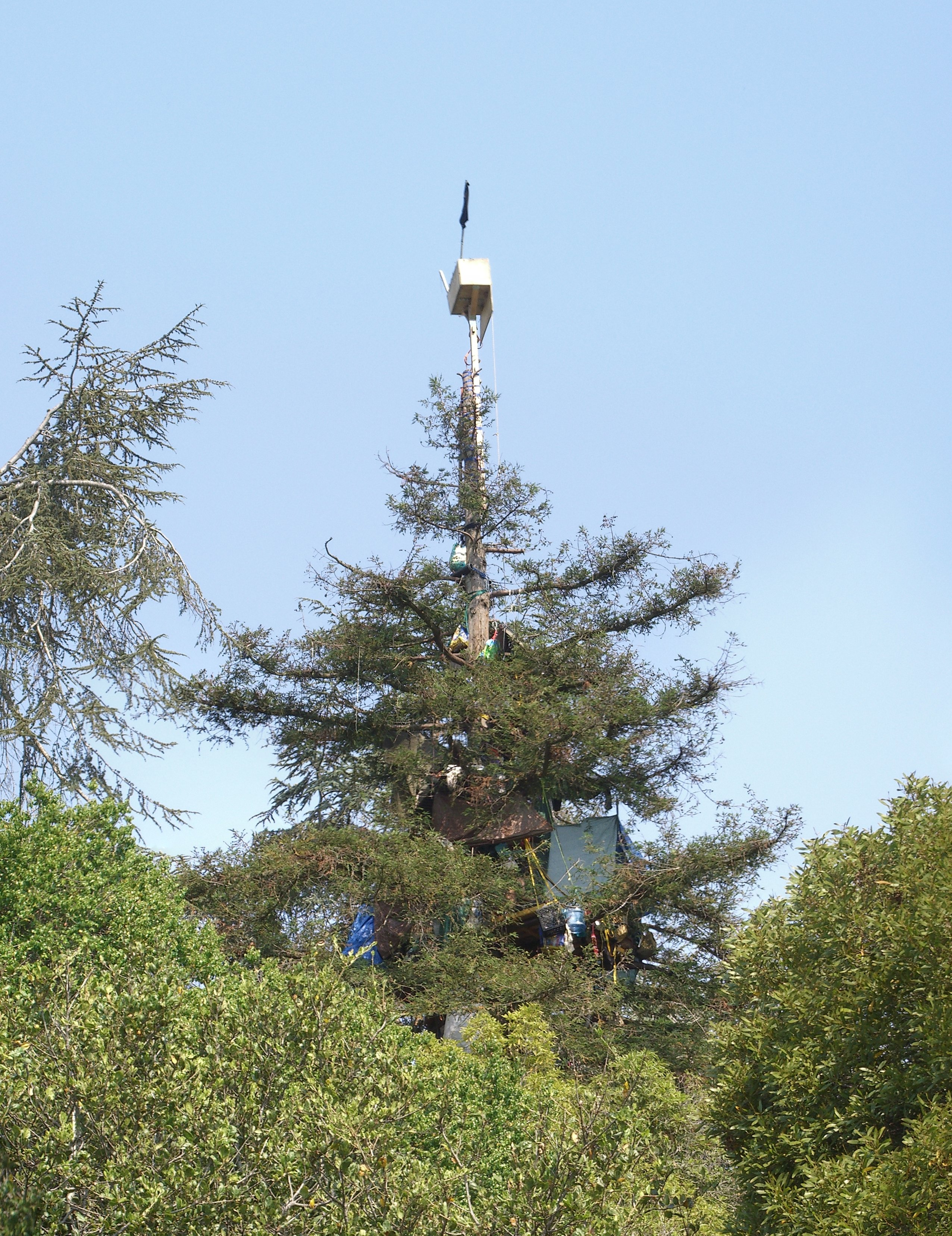
The tree-sitters' camp as of July 8, 2008.

The tree-sit was initiated and led by Zachary RunningWolf, a community activist and former Berkeley mayoral candidate. RunningWolf said that construction of the athletic center would be "a hate crime; we call it Guantánamo Berkeley". He also has said that the Illuminati and the Masons are conspiring to build the center because "the grove is at the intersection of compass lines connecting the Haas School of Business (money) with Alcatraz (state violence) and the Lawrence Berkeley lab that gave America nukes".

The protest ran from December 2, 2006, to September 9, 2008, and was the longest urban tree-sit ever.

In September 2007 the university reported that there had been 155 violations and 98 arrests or citations in connection with the protest. By April 5, 2008, the protest had also generated more than 200 police reports, most of which were filed against the protesters.

As of November 2007 the university had spent $125,000 for private security guards at the grove, $100,000 in covering costs incurred by the University of California Police Department (UCPD) that were not part of their normal on-duty operations, and $117,000 in building two fences around the grove. As of April 5, 2008, the cost to UCPD had reached $300,000.

=== Burial grounds ===
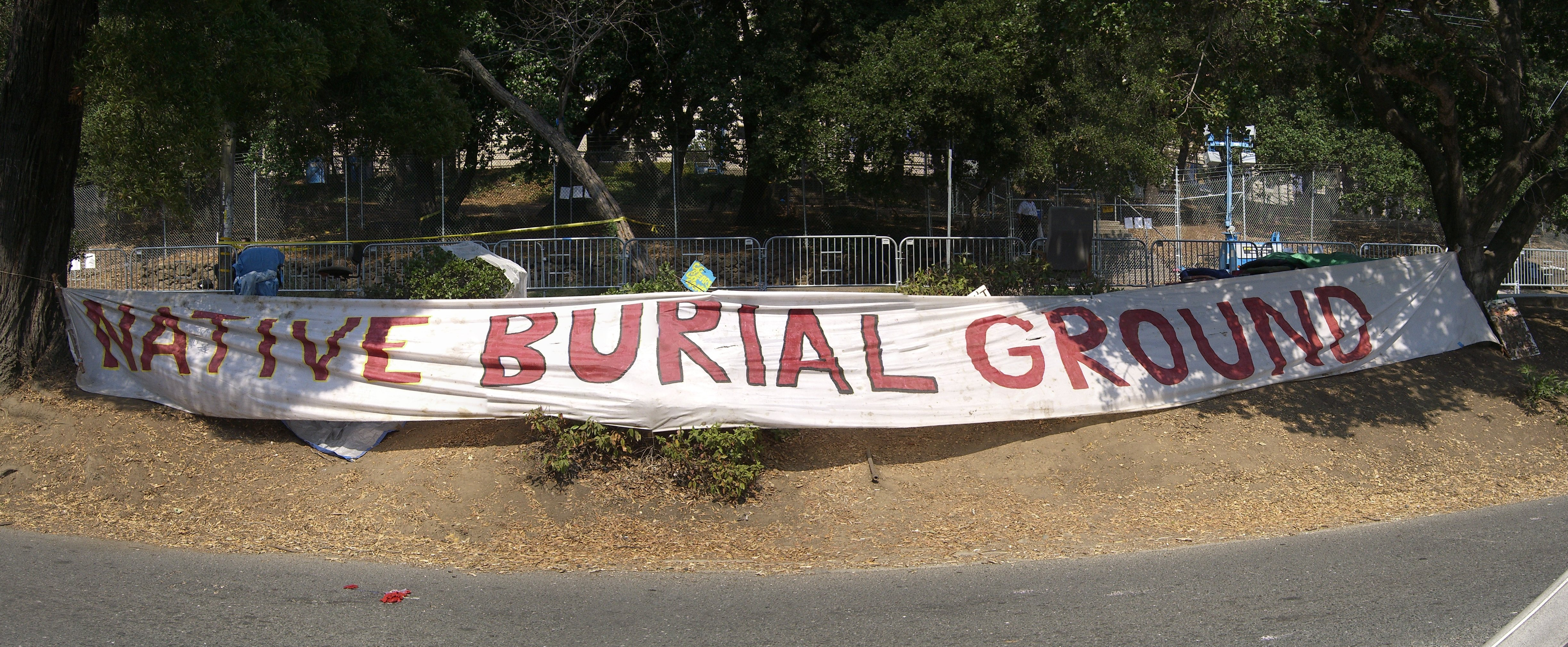
Berkeley Memorial Stadium oak grove and protest banner reading "Native Burial Grounds"

On February 16, 2007, RunningWolf produced an archaeological survey document stating that the proposed location of the athletic center was "an area producing burials". The document had been provided by an anonymous sympathizer. A San Francisco Examiner article from 1925 was included with the survey document that indicated that Leslie Spier, an assistant professor of anthropology at the University of Washington, had unearthed three bodies in the area and believed the remains were part of an American Indian burial site. The article also indicated that bodies had been unearthed during the original construction of the stadium, but did not say if they were believed to be American Indian remains. There is some confusion as to which site the skeletons came from as the survey document covers both the stadium site and Faculty Glade, which is located 200 yards away. The Save the Oaks Foundation claims as many as 18 burials have been discovered at the stadium site.

RunningWolf stated that University administrators did not make this fact clear in the environmental impact report filed for the project. The University responded that the report did state that there was high chance of archaeological sites within the planned area of construction. University administrators stated that they would perform a subsurface, archaeological test after a court-ordered injunction was lifted. The test would determine if the site contained remains of historical importance.

Although RunningWolf claimed that California Senate Bill 18 would prevent further construction on the site, the University stated that the presence of remains would not stop them from building the athletic center. Larry Myers, executive secretary of the Native American Heritage Commission confirmed that California law does not outlaw construction on burial grounds. While federal laws require that descendants and the local Native American Heritage Commission must oversee any removal of remains from a site, the laws do not prevent construction on sites once the remains have been removed.

Kent Lightfoot, a curator at the University's Phoebe Hearst Museum of Anthropology, said that there was no clear ethnic identification of the skeletons, nor evidence that they were part of a larger burial grounds and not simply isolated skeletons. Lightfoot went on to say that the only known artifact recovered near the skeletons was a Mexican coin from the second quarter of the 19th century.

Some American Indian leaders expressed anger at the plans to build on the site. Corrina Gould, an Ohlone Indian, said that the site was sacred to the Ohlone. Malcolm Margolin, the author of The Ohlone Way said that the site was a likely spot for an Ohlone village. Indian leader Wounded Knee, of the Ohlone tribe, expressed anger with the planned construction, saying the site was being desecrated. However, Andrew Galvan, an Ohlone tribe member who collaborates with the university on research, stated that he was unaware of any proof of an Ohlone burial site in the grove.

The California Oak Foundation amended their lawsuit to reflect the presence of the remains.

=== Nude photo shoot ===
On March 17, 2007, more than 100 people took part in a nude photo shoot by Jack Gescheidt with the oak trees as part of his TreeSpirit Project. Although the participants were told by UCPD that they would be arrested for public indecency, no arrests were made.

=== Tree-sitters remove branches ===
On July 16, 2007, UCPD reported that a redwood and a cedar in the grove had been damaged. The police suspected the tree-sitters of causing the damage during the construction of their sleeping platform. A spokesman for the protesters said that the platform was constructed in such a way as not to cause damage to the trees.

RunningWolf responded by saying that the tree-sitters had in fact removed the branches, but had done so for preservation purposes. RunningWolf said the redwood, which had its top removed by the protesters, was already dead and that the other branches removed were also dead. RunningWolf said that "We have a professional arborist with us along with my (Native American knowledge) of how to help the tree regenerate after pruning the degenerative material off the tree". The UCPD in turn claimed the trees were trimmed to allow more room for platform construction. RunningWolf denied that the trees were cut to make room for platforms, saying that doing so would be "against our way of life". RunningWolf also stated that those responsible for cutting the trees had already left the grove due to the high turnover of protesters in the branches.

The university's landscape architect and grounds services manager both agree that while pruning was not necessarily bad for the trees, removing the top of the redwood was bad practice as the tree would grow back weakly attached branches.

=== The first fence ===
On August 29, 2007, a chain link fence was constructed around the protesters. The fence was erected to prevent confrontation between the protesters and the sellout crowd of 72,516 people (17,000 of them from Tennessee, the opposing team) that were expected to attend the opening game of the California Golden Bears' football season. Protesters responded with shouts and promises to make it difficult for the UCPD to guard the fence. The protesters claimed the fence was erected not to protect them, but to starve them out. Some have drawn comparisons between the building of the fence, and the attempted take back of People's Park in 1969, in which the California National Guard was called in to remove protesters. Initially the police did not allow food and water to be passed over the fence to the tree sitters, but started to allow the deliveries by the evening. Two men were arrested following scuffles with police. Around 200 additional people joined hands around the fence in support of the tree sitters. The fence cost the University between $10,000 and $12,000 to build. Despite the fence, more protesters took up spots in the trees.

The California Oak Foundation challenged the construction of the fence in Hayward court, saying it violated a previous court order banning construction on the site. Judge Barbara Miller ruled that the fence was not in violation of her previous court order.

=== Eviction judgment ===
On September 12, 2007, the University announced that it would seek a restraining order to remove the protesters. The university claimed that the camp was a fire hazard because of two propane burners used to heat food. The university also claimed that falling containers of human excrement constituted a health hazard. Although RunningWolf denied the allegations of propane tanks being used, one was visible from the ground and four other protesters confirmed that they used them.

On October 1, 2007, Alameda County Superior Court Judge Richard Keller ruled after a 90-minute hearing that the sit-in was illegal, that the First Amendment rights of the protesters were not violated as they were free to use them elsewhere, and that the university had a right to keep people off its property. Protesters who attended the hearing vowed to continue their protest regardless of the five days of jail time and $1000 fine that could be imposed upon them. Although the initial ruling was targeted against only protester David Galloway, on October 29, 2007, Judge Keller extended his ruling to apply to "all other persons acting in concert or participating with (the protesters)". The UCPD stated that even with the ruling they did not yet intend to remove the protesters.

=== The second fence ===
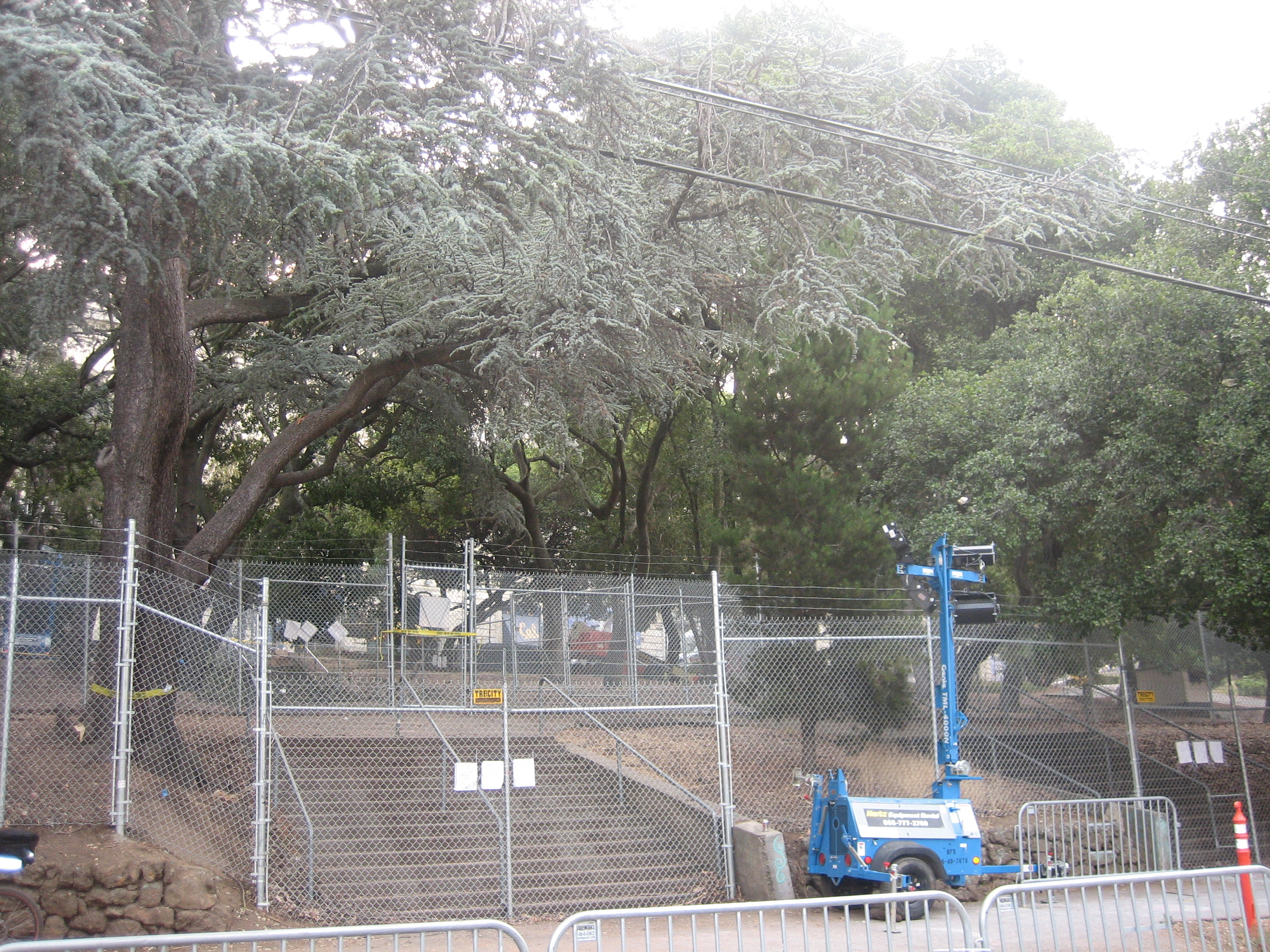
Police fences surrounding the Berkeley Memorial Stadium oak grove.

On November 8, 2007, a second chain link fence was constructed around the oak grove. According to the University, the second fence was erected to protect and separate the tree sitters from the fans attending the Golden Bears' last home football game of the season, against the University of Southern California. The away fans numbered more than at the Tennessee game that prompted the construction of the first fence, with 20,000 fans showing up from Los Angeles. In a letter to Alameda County Superior Court Judge Barbara Miller the University stated that the new fence was the first step in removing the tree-sitters "without unnecessary risk" to either the protesters or UCPD. The new fence was placed an average of 25 feet (8 m) from the previous fence, with standoffs for barbed wire, although initially the wire was not mounted. The protesters were still allowed to have supplies brought to them.

The fence was constructed in preparation for Judge Miller's ruling as to whether construction of the athletic center may proceed, which at the time was expected sometime after November 14, 2007. This date however was postponed, and a final ruling was handed down on June 18, 2008.

Although the new fence was constructed to allow the UCPD to control entry into and out of the grove, protesters were still able to access their platforms by climbing a nearby telephone pole on city property.

==== Barbed wire addition ====
On November 15, 2007, gaps in the fence that had been left to allow access to Memorial Stadium for California's final home game were filled in, and barbed wire was mounted around the top. The completed fence cost the university $80,000; the University administrators claim the project did not come from funds allocated for research or education.

=== Protesters' supplies removed ===
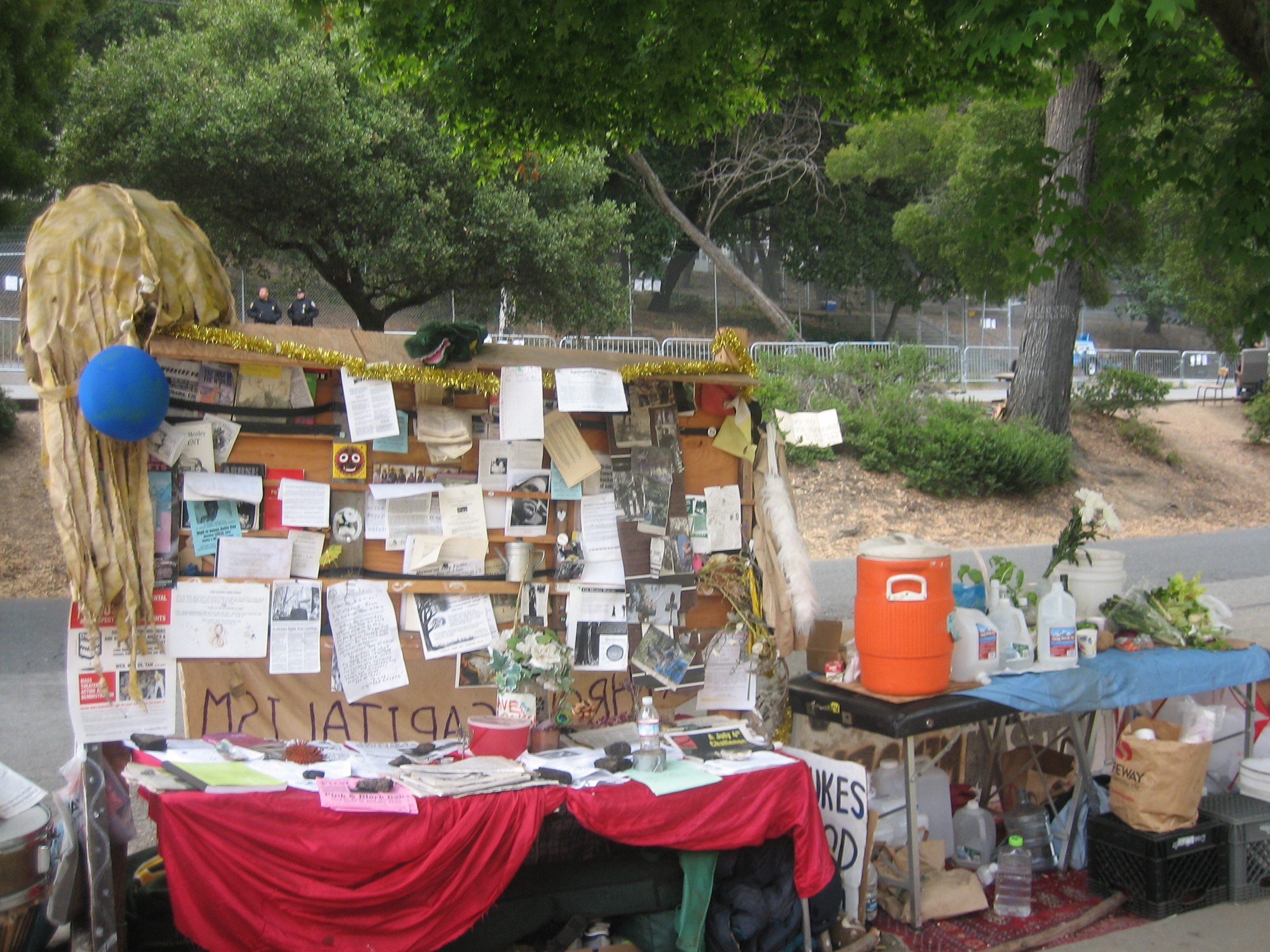
Protester supplies and information near the Berkeley Memorial Stadium oak grove.

On February 19, 2008, a university-hired contractor climbed the oaks and began removing items that could fall from the trees, as well as the ropes used to climb from tree to tree and hold supplies and tarps and platforms used as shelter. The UCPD described it as an effort to clean up the area while there were only four or five protesters present—far fewer than normal. Supporters of the tree-sitters said the university intentionally chose to remove the supplies on a day on which rain was forecast in order to leave the protesters exposed to the elements. The university stated at the time that they intended to leave the protesters in place until a final court ruling on the building of the center.

On June 17, 2008, the university once again hired contractors to remove some of the protesters' platforms, lines, and other infrastructure. The operation was started the day before a final ruling on the athletic center was expected in order to prevent more protesters from ascending the trees once the ruling was announced. One protester was removed from the trees and arrested after she allegedly bit one of the contractors. She was charged with assault, battery, resisting arrest, providing false information, trespassing and refusing to leave. One contractor was punched twice in the face during the operation. The protesters threw human urine and feces at the contractors and police throughout the day. Despite the actions of the university, about a dozen protesters remained in the grove.

On June 18, 2008, around 200 peopled gathered around the oak grove as the university continued to remove the infrastructure set up by the protesters. Two more protesters were arrested, one for vandalism after he cut a tie linking police barricades together and one for attempting to grab a cutting tool out of the hands of one of the contractors.

=== Outside resupply prohibited, university begins to provide food and water ===
The university cut off outside resupply of the protesters on June 19, 2008. The university claimed in a letter to the Berkeley City Council that to the best of their knowledge the protesters had sufficient food and water and that the university would take action to maintain the health and safety of the protesters should they not come down. In response to the cutting off of supplies the City Council voted to send two city officials to the grove to check on the welfare of the protesters on June 24, 2008. The two officials, the Assistant City Manager and the Assistant Fire Chief, reported to the City Council on June 25, 2008, the protesters did indeed have sufficient food and water, and would refuse any supplies offered by the UCPD. Later that same day Mayor Tom Bates and City Manager Phil Kamlarz met with university officials to discuss the health of the tree-sitters.

In response to the university's removal of some of the protesters from the grove and cutting off of supplies to the remaining protesters, attorneys for the tree-sitters asked Judge Richard Keller to order that food and water be allowed to be sent to the protesters. Judge Keller ruled on June 30, 2008, that while his previous restraining order against the tree-sitters remained in force, the university would need to take precautions to prevent endangering the protesters. Judge Keller stated that the university had no need to take aggressive action, and if they continued to take actions that endangered the protesters he would "become more aggressively involved". Judge Keller also ruled that the university did not have to provide food or water for the protesters as they were free to obey his previous order and come down at any time.

Prior to Judge Keller's ruling, on June 26, 2008, the university began supplying water to the remaining tree-sitters. The university provided 12 liters (3 imp gal; 3 U.S. gal) of water in twenty-four bottles. On June 27, 2008, the university began providing the tree sitters with 1,200 kilocalories (5,000 kJ) of energy bars per protester and 10 U.S. gallons (38 L; 8 imp gal) of water daily.

=== Some protesters come down, another arrives ===
On June 25, 2008, two protesters voluntarily descended from the trees. Both were arrested for violation of court orders and promptly released from jail as part of an agreement made between them and the UCPD. The two stated they did not leave because of lack of supplies and were confident that the remaining protesters would remain until they won.

On July 1, 2008, four more protesters left the grove, leaving three protesters still in the trees. At 11:00 pm three of the tree-sitters were seen on the ground, at which point the UCPD arrested one of them for trespassing and violating a court order, causing the other two to take refuge in a nearby tree. Assistant Police Chief Mitch Celaya talked to the two tree-sitters for a couple of hours, at which point they agreed to come down. One of the protesters who was talked down did so with the condition that they would be allowed to make a video statement. Another protester came down later in the day after indicating that she might have an undetermined medical condition that would require treatment. RunningWolf said that she collapsed three times once she was on the ground. RunningWolf blamed the conditions on the long exposure to the elements, lack of food and water, and lack of sleep due to the lights the police set up surrounding the grove and the noise from the generators needed to power them. The university said they were happy that their strategy to get the tree-sitters to leave the grove was working. RunningWolf said that the remaining protesters would remain in the trees until at least 2008-07-17, when Judge Miller was expected to make a final ruling.

On July 6, 2008, new protester Jeff Muskrat, carrying a pack with supplies, scaled the fences surrounding the grove and joined the three remaining tree-sitters. Jeff Muskrat climbed the fence after a message was posted on indybay.org that called for "'Ninja's' with climbing experience to break the lines and sneak into the grove". The new protester said that he had not previously been a member of the tree-sit, but supported their goals and so drove down from Oregon to join them. On July 14, 2008, Jeff Muskrat climbed down from the trees due to a death in his family. He was subsequently arrested for violating a court order, trespassing, vandalism, and possession of marijuana. His arrest outraged supporters of the protesters who thought the agreement with police had been that he would not be held in custody. The university however stated that they had told the people holding the protester that they had no objection to him being released once charged, which was expected to happen later that day.

The university, which had been providing 1,200 kilocalories (5,000 kJ) of energy bars per protester per day while preventing outside supply of the tree-sitters, said they would increase the amount to 1,800 kilocalories (7,500 kJ) while also taking the new protester into account. The new rations were provided in the form of United States Coast Guard rations, and not the Clif Bars that had been previously provided. While the new rations were described as less palatable, the university stated they still met daily nutritional needs.

=== Protest at Chancellor Birgeneau's residence ===
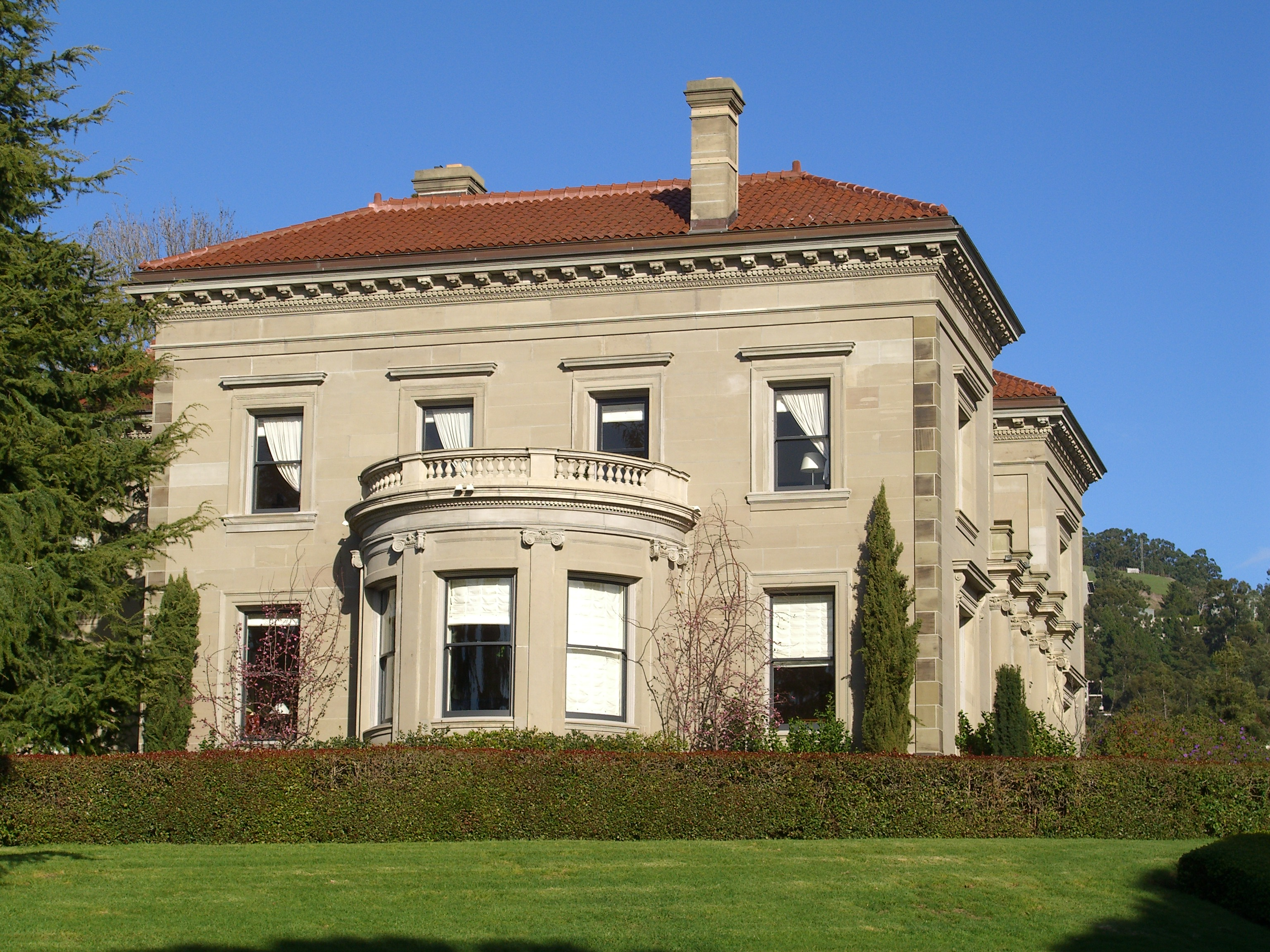
University house, Chancellor Birgeneau's on campus residence.

At around 5 p.m. on July 20, 2008, between thirty and fifty people marched from the oak grove to the university house, the on-campus home of the University's Chancellor Robert J. Birgeneau. They then dug a hole two feet in diameter on the chancellor's lawn and planted a six-inch oak seedling. The seedling had been raised over the past year from an acorn that had fallen from one of the trees in the grove. Six protesters were arrested for trespassing, vandalism and conspiracy. One of the six was charged with battery after she allegedly hit a police officer on the head with a bamboo pole. The police were looking for a seventh person in connection with the protest. RunningWolf said the tree had been meant as an olive branch.

=== The university removes branches ===
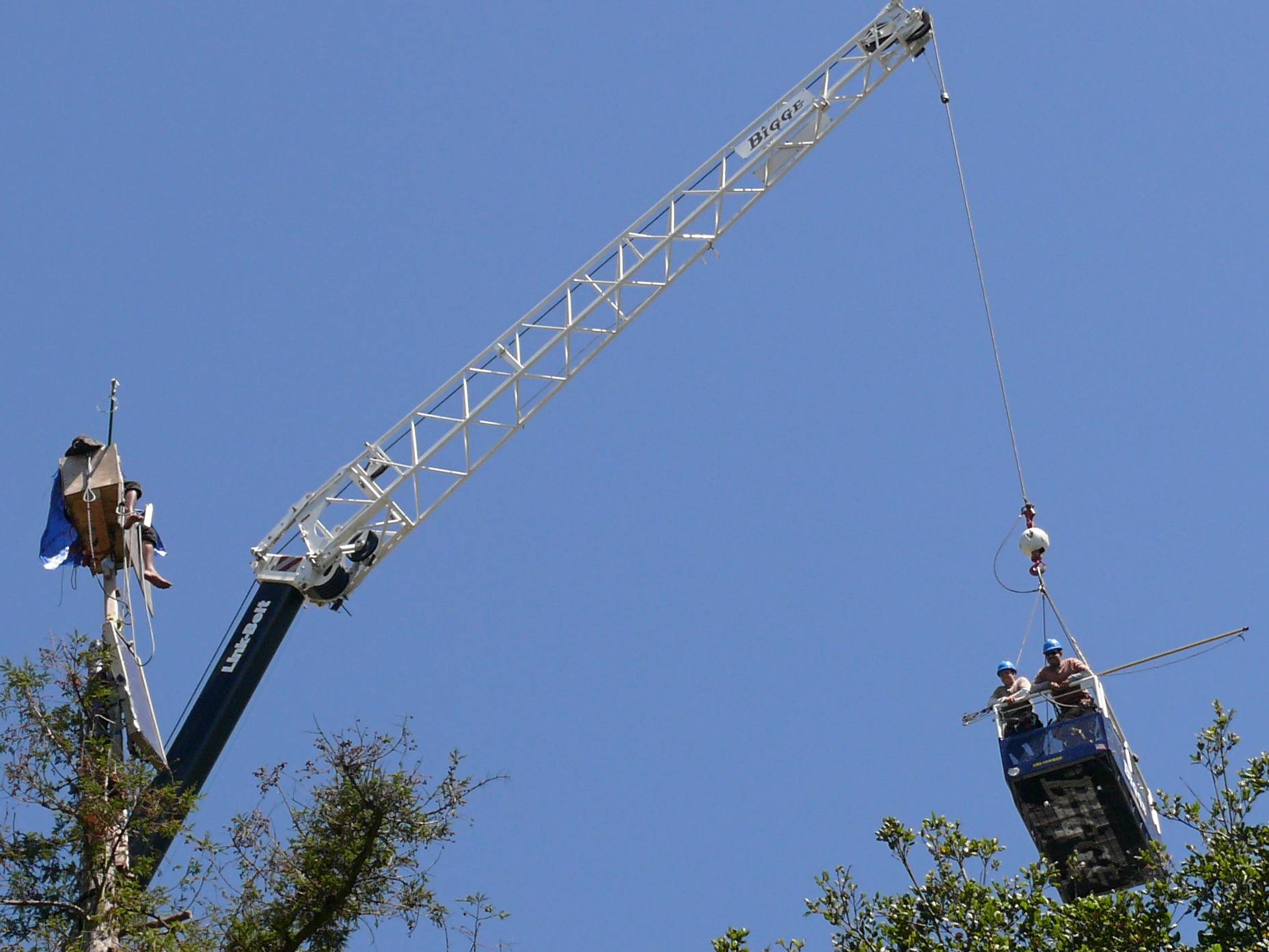
Workers from the University removing tree limbs.

On August 21, 2008, university contractors were brought in to trim branches off of the tree in which the protesters were residing. They removed twenty-two branches from the redwood tree that the protesters were living in, and four branches from two live oaks nearby.

The contractors removed all the branches below 35 feet (11 m) in an attempt to make it difficult for more protesters to ascend the tree, and to free up some UCPD officers ahead of the beginning of the fall semester.

RunningWolf accused the university of violating Judge Miller's order preventing construction on the site. The university responded by saying that they had informed Judge Miller at 9:00 a.m. that morning of their plans to remove the branches, including an affidavit from a horticulturalist and pictures of the branches to be removed. The university further states that the court order allows them to conduct limited pruning for safety and security reasons.

=== Grove cut down ===
On September 4, 2008, an Appeals court agreed to hear an appeal, but declined to issue a new injunction. On September 5 and 6 the majority of the grove was cut down by the University, with the exception of one tree that contained the remaining protesters.

=== Tree-sitters descend ===
Starting at 8:00 a.m. on September 9, 2008, contractors hired by the university began constructing a 90 feet (27 m) scaffolding around the tree occupied by the tree-sitters. At the same time the UCPD began to move cherry picker vehicles into position around the tree. The cherry pickers were topped with fabric panels to shield the contractors against anything thrown by the tree-sitters as the scaffolding was constructed. While the scaffolding was under construction, UCPD Chief Victoria Harrison and Assistant Chief Mitch Celaya negotiated with the tree-sitters from a large metal basket suspended from a crane. At noon the scaffolding reached the level of the tree-sitters platform, at which time the tree-sitters platform was dismantled and thrown to the ground to allow the scaffolding to continue. At 12:42 p.m. the scaffolding was completed, with a railing around the highest platform. The UCPD then mounted the scaffolding and began to remove the protesters' supplies. The tree-sitters agreed to come down at 1:01 p.m. after the university agreed to involve the community in addressing future land use issues.

The four tree-sitters were arrested once they came down, although the university said they did not expect to file felony charges. Five protesters were also arrested on the ground and charged with offenses including battery and resisting arrest.

After the tree-sitters were removed, the university denied that it had made any concessions. The tree that the protesters had occupied was cut down around 5 p.m.

== Court cases ==
In addition to the tree sit-ins, the University has been sued by three parties to prevent construction of the facility: The California Oak Foundation, which wants to save the trees, the City of Berkeley, which is concerned with site safety, and the Panoramic Hill Association, which worries about increased traffic loads. The California Oak Foundation amended their lawsuit to reflect the presence of the possible American Indian remains at the site in June 2007. The three cases were consolidated and began September 19, 2007.

=== Initial lawsuit ===
The initial lawsuit was handled by Alameda County Superior Court Judge Barbara Miller. She handed down an initial ruling on June 18, 2008, and another ruling on July 22, 2008. Judge Miller's July 22, 2008, ruling was thought to be a final ruling, but an appellate court ruled on August 7, 2008, that the trial with Judge Miller was still ongoing. Judge Miller confirmed her earlier ruling as final on August 26, 2008.

==== The University's settlement offer ====
On September 4, 2007, the University offered a settlement proposal to the Berkeley City Council, under which all trees in the grove would still be chopped down and which would decrease parking in the stadium area even further. The settlement also offered to replace each removed tree with two newly planted trees and one large nursery oak, but did not state where these new trees would be planted. The University also offered a promise to schedule no more than eight football games and seven other events drawing more than 10,000 people a year at the stadium and promised to not plan events that require additional sound amplification other than the built-in stadium system. The university also offered to construct the new athletic center and retrofit the current stadium concurrently to make the stadium earthquake safe more quickly. The settlement was rejected by the Berkeley City Council with a vote of seven against, one for, and one abstaining. City Attorney Manuela Albuquerque opposed the settlement offer because she said she did not "consider the offer to be serious".

==== Judge Miller tours the site ====
On October 4, 2007, Judge Miller, in a rare if not unprecedented move, visited Memorial Stadium and the oak grove. Judge Miller was escorted by three police officers as well as attorneys for both sides and a group of journalists. Judge Miller was shown the stadium, the locker rooms and current training facilities, as well as the proposed construction site. Judge Miller was also taken to an alternate site at the southwest side of campus, and then to Golden Gate Fields in Albany. Golden Gate Fields was suggested as an alternate site for the football program in the environmental impact report the university filed. Both sides expressed confidence that having Judge Miller visit the site would help their side in the lawsuit.

==== Initial ruling ====
On June 18, 2008, Alameda County Superior Court Judge Barbara Miller released her ruling in the lawsuit brought by the California Oak Foundation, the City of Berkeley. and the Panoramic Hill Association. Both the university and the protesters claimed that the 129-page ruling supported their side. Judge Miller found that the proposed center did not "as a whole" violate the Alquist Priolo Special Studies Zone Act because it would not be built on a fault line. However, Judge Miller also ruled that some parts of the proposed project are alterations to California Memorial Stadium. By state law the value of these alterations can not exceed half the current value of the stadium. The University's estimate of the stadium's value is $593 million, while the attorney for the California Oak Foundation claims the stadium's current value is "near zero".

===== Response =====
On June 24, 2008, the plaintiffs handed in their proposal for the final ruling, as requested by Judge Miller in her initial ruling. They argued that the plans for an athletic center should be canceled if the university could not show that they could retrofit the stadium while complying with the Alquist Priolo Special Studies Zone Act. The plaintiffs also stated that the university should drop plans to hold non-football events at the stadium, as this would be the only way to prevent excessive noise and traffic congestion.

The university asked Judge Miller on July 1, 2008, to lift a seventeen-month-old injunction preventing construction on the site of the grove, arguing that the university had satisfied all safety issues and was bearing severe economic hardship due to the delays. The plaintiffs argued that the injunction should only be lifted if the university could provide a lawful project. Judge Miller scheduled a hearing on July 17, 2008, to discuss the request.

==== Intermediate ruling ====
On July 22, 2008, Judge Miller handed down what was thought to be her final ruling. Judge Miller ruled that the University's amended proposal satisfied environmental and seismic safety requirements. Judge Miller also ruled that her previous injunction against construction on the site would be lifted in seven days, on July 29, 2008, allowing the university to remove the trees and begin construction. Judge Miller ruled that the plaintiffs would have to pay 85% of the university's court costs, split evenly among the three parties, not including attorney fees.

The university claimed that each day of delay cost $47,000 in additional security and increases in construction costs.

==== Appeal begins and is sent back ====
Judge Miller specifically allowed her injunction to stand for seven days to allow time for appeals to be filed. The appealing parties had to show that Judge Miller was faulty in her ruling and explain why a further injunction should be imposed. The automatic extension allows for both sides to prepare material for their arguments in the appeals case. The plaintiffs also asked for a writ of supersedeas and an immediate stay from the Court of Appeals.

The Berkeley City Council met on July 25, 2008, to determine their response to the ruling, and decided to take no action. The Council required five votes to approve the appeal, but fell short of this number. The meeting started with public comments from almost one hundred residents, the vast majority of which were in favor of appealing. Those opposed to appealing included the Berkeley Chamber of Commerce. Mayor Tom Bates said he was encouraged by the university's assurances that they would move forward with seismically retrofitting Memorial Stadium soon. The announcement by the council was met by shouts of "Shame! Shame!" from the supporters of the protesters. The lawsuit was estimated to have cost $300,000, with an appeal expected to add roughly $60,000 more to the cost. The Chamber of Commerce and the Downtown Berkeley Association both cited the high cost of the lawsuit as a reason not to appeal the ruling during their arguments in front of the City Council. The council had until September 21, 2008, to decide whether to join the appeal, but ultimately did not do so.

Both the California Oak Foundation and the Panoramic Hill Association filed notices to appeal on July 24, 2008, which extended the injunction for twenty days, until August 13, 2008.

On August 13, 2008, the appellate court dismissed the appeal because they considered the trial with Judge Miller to still be ongoing, ruling that because there had been no "final determination of the rights of the parties" and that the 30-day window Judge Miller had granted for the university to alter their plans had not ended that the case was not ready for appeal. Because the appellate case was not going to go forward, they also denied a request by the petitioners to extend the injunction through the duration of the appellate case. However, they ruled that the injunction should stand until Judge Miller finalized her ruling.

==== Final ruling ====
On August 26, 2008, in a three line ruling, Judge Miller confirmed her previous intermediate ruling. The university agreed not to begin construction until an appellate court ruled on whether to continue the injunction.

=== Appellate lawsuit ===
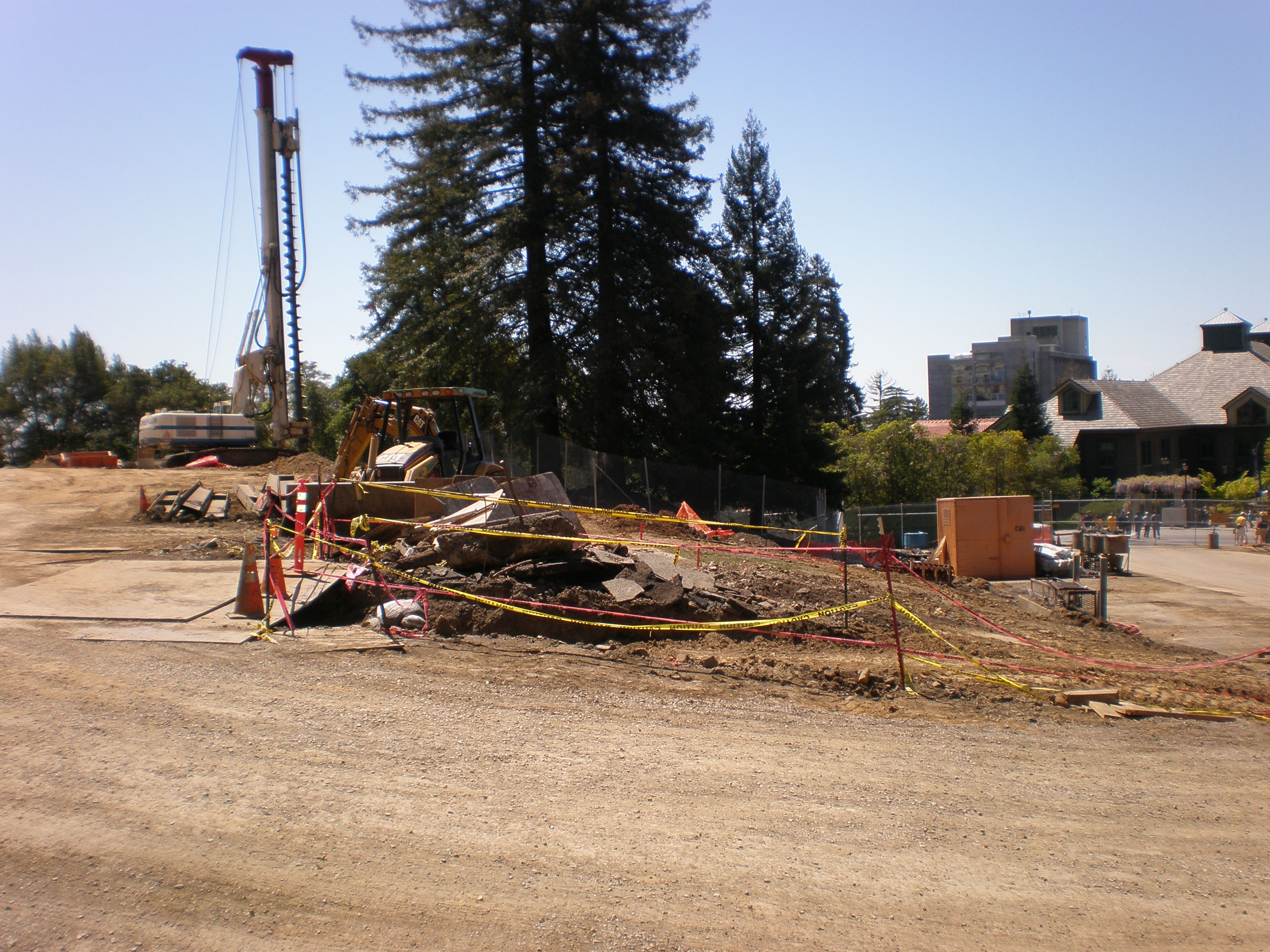
Seismic improvements underway on the west side of Memorial Stadium in April 2009

The plaintiffs filed another appeal on August 28, 2008. As with the previous appeal the California Oak Foundation and the Panoramic Hill Association filed notices to appeal, while the Berkeley City Council declined to join.

On September 4, 2008, the state appeals court agreed to hear the appeals, but declined to extend the injunction, which allowed the university to begin cutting down the grove.

== Reactions ==
Many Berkeley students and residents have expressed disapproval of the protest, while others approved. A poll for the local CBS affiliate showed that Berkeley residents were evenly divided on the issue. 43% of respondents sided with the University while 41% sided with the protesters, with a margin of error of 4.6%.

In 2006 more than 600 Berkeley students joined a Facebook group dedicated to opposing the removal of the oaks. A similar number of students joined a Facebook group called "Students Against Hippies in Trees" to oppose the protest.

An editorial in the UC Berkeley student newspaper, The Daily Californian, found fault with all sides in the conflict. They blamed the university for not communicating with the city and citizens, the California Oak Foundation for ignoring the larger issues of deforestation while focusing on just a few trees, the Panoramic Hill Association for reverting too quickly to lawsuits, and the tree-sitters for needlessly prolonging the protest once a court-ordered injunction was delivered.
