= The Heavenly Body =

1944 film by Vincente Minnelli, Alexander Hall

- Theatrical release poster
- Directed by: Alexander Hall
- Written by: Harry Kurnitz (adaptation) Irving Brecher (uncredited)
- Screenplay by: Michael Arlen; Walter Reisch
- Story by: Jacques Théry
- Produced by: Arthur Hornblow Jr.
- Starring: William Powell; Hedy Lamarr; James Craig
- Cinematography: Robert H. Planck; William H. Daniels
- Edited by: Blanche Sewell
- Music by: Bronislau Kaper
- Production company: Metro-Goldwyn-Mayer
- Distributed by: Loew's Inc.
- Release date: February 2, 1944 (San Francisco)
- Running time: 95 minutes
- Country: United States
- Language: English

The Heavenly Body is a 1944 American screwball romantic comedy film directed by Alexander Hall and starring William Powell, Hedy Lamarr, and James Craig, with Fay Bainter, Henry O'Neill, and Spring Byington in supporting roles. Based on a story by Jacques Théry and a screenplay by Michael Arlen and Walter Reisch, the film is about the wife of an astronomer who is convinced of her astrologer's prediction that she will meet her true love. Produced by Arthur Hornblow Jr., it was released by Metro-Goldwyn-Mayer.

== Plot ==
In suburban Los Angeles, astronomer William Whitley is undertaking groundbreaking research on a new comet. His wife, Vicky, has grown lonely amidst his commitment to his professional pursuits. Vicky visits Margaret Sibyll, an astrologer recommended by her neighbor, Nancy. Margaret predicts that something "important" will soon happen to Vicky.

Vicky tells Bill that because of her astrological "aspects," the two can no longer kiss on Tuesdays. Two weeks later, Vicky visits William at his observatory and informs him she is leaving him for an unnamed man who Margaret has predicted she will soon meet. An irate William begins living in his observatory, attempting to focus on his work. Two weeks later, Vicky phones William at the observatory and states that Margaret's prediction failed to materialize, and that she believes her to be a charlatan.

A relieved William races home to greet Vicky, but before he arrives, Vicky meets Lloyd Hunter, a handsome neighbor who fits the description of the man Margaret predicts she would meet. The following day, Lloyd is stunned when William reveals Vicky's plan to make him her new husband. Lloyd agrees to avoid Vicky, but eventually returns and admits he wishes to pursue her. Later, at a lecture with his coworker Professor Stowe, William looks through a small telescope he has used to spy on Vicky and discovers she has left to their mountain cabin to meet Lloyd. After the lecture, William rushes to the cabin, which Vicky insists she visited to avoid Lloyd.

The next day, William decides to steal Vicky's weekly horoscope and replace it with one that predicts his own imminent death. Vicky calls Margaret to confirm the prediction, unaware that William is with Margaret, having threatened to destroy her office if she does not comply with his plot. An intimidated Margaret goes along with William's plan, successfully convincing Vicky to postpone her abandonment of him.

Later, William gets drunk with a Russian dog groomer, whom he claims to Vicky is his doctor who confirmed his terminal diagnosis. As William prepares to write a final will, Vicky summoned by Margaret. Lloyd visits the Whitleys' house and informs William about Margaret's contact with Vicky. A furious Bill leaves, but to Lloyd's dismay, Vicky is touched by the lengths William has gone to prevent her from being with Lloyd. Three weeks later, with William still missing, Vicky departs for Reno to get a divorce. En route, she stops at William's observatory and, while looking through his telescope, witnesses Bill arriving at their cabin. A gleeful Vicky leave the observatory to reunite with him.

== Cast ==
- William Powell as William S. Whitley
- Hedy Lamarr as Vicky Whitley
- Fay Bainter as Margaret Sibyll
- James Craig as Lloyd X. Hunter
- Henry O'Neill as Professor Stowe
- Spring Byington as Nancy Potter
- Robert Sully as Strand
- Morris Ankrum as Dr. Green
- Franco Corsaro as Sebastian Melas
- Connie Gilchrist as Beulah - 'Delia Murphy'
- Max Willenz as Dr. Gurtchakoff
- Alex Melesh as Vladimir
- Earl Schenck as Forbes
- Arthur Space as Pierson
- Helen Freeman as Stella
- Phyllis Kennedy as Ethel (the maid)
- Marietta Canty as Pearl
- John Elliott as Prof. Collier (uncredited)
- Howard Hickman as Scientist (uncredited)

== Release ==
The Heavenly Body had its world premiere in San Francisco on February 2, 1944. It later opened at the Plaza Theatre in Palm Springs, California on March 18, 1944.
