= Arise, My Love =

1940 film by Mitchell Leisen

- Theatrical release poster
- Directed by: Mitchell Leisen
- Written by: Billy Wilder; Charles Brackett; Jacques Théry
- Based on: story by Benjamin Glazer, Hans Székely (as John S. Toldy)
- Produced by: Arthur Hornblow Jr.
- Starring: Claudette Colbert; Ray Milland; Dennis O'Keefe
- Cinematography: Charles Lang
- Edited by: Doane Harrison
- Music by: Victor Young
- Production company: Paramount Pictures
- Distributed by: Paramount Pictures
- Release date: November 8, 1940
- Running time: 110 minutes
- Country: United States
- Language: English

Arise, My Love is a 1940 American romantic comedy film directed by Mitchell Leisen and starring Claudette Colbert, Ray Milland and Dennis O'Keefe. It was made by Paramount Pictures and written by Billy Wilder, Charles Brackett and Jacques Théry. Containing an interventionist message, it tells the love story of a pilot and a journalist who meet in the latter days of the Spanish Civil War and follows them through the early days of World War II. Colbert once said that Arise, My Love was her personal favorite motion picture of all the films she had made. (Note: The film's title comes from the Song of Solomon 2:10: "My beloved speaks and says to me: "Arise, my love, my fair one ...")

Arise, My Love is based on the true story of Harold Edward Dahl. During the Spanish Civil War, Dahl, who was fighting as a pilot for the Spanish Republican Air Force, was shot down and taken as prisoner of war. Initially sentenced to death, there were some diplomatic movements to free Dahl. His first wife, Edith Rogers, a known singer of impressive beauty, was said to have visited Francisco Franco herself to plead for his life. He remained in prison until 1940 and then returned to the United States.

== Plot ==
American pilot Tom Martin (Ray Milland) is a soldier of fortune who went to Spain to fight in the Spanish Civil War. During the summer of 1939, he is languishing in a prison cell while awaiting execution. Unexpectedly granted a pardon on the morning that he is to face a firing squad, Tom's release has been managed by reporter Augusta "Gusto" Nash (Claudette Colbert), who posed as his wife. When the prison governor learns of the deception, the pair has to run for their lives.

Ending up in Paris, Tom tries, without success, to woo Gusto. When she is sent to Berlin as a correspondent, Tom pursues her with both of them again on the run as Hitler invades Poland. Booking passage on the ill-fated SS Athenia, the ship is torpedoed by a German submarine. After their rescue, Tom joins the RAF while Gusto remains in France as a war correspondent. At the fall of Paris, Tom is reunited with Gusto, and both decide to return home to convince Americans that a real danger awaits.

== Cast ==
- Claudette Colbert as Augusta (Gusto) Nash
- Ray Milland as Tom Martin
- Dennis O'Keefe as Joe "Shep" Shepard
- Walter Abel as Mr. Phillips
- Dick Purcell as Pinky O'Connor
- George Zucco as Prison Governor
- Frank Puglia as Father Jacinto
- Esther Dale as Secretary
- Paul Leyssac as Bresson
- Ann Codee as Mme. Bresson
- Stanley Logan as Col. Tubbs Brown
- Lionel Pape as Lord Kettlebrook
- Aubrey Mather as Achille
- Cliff Nazarro as Botzelberg

== Production ==
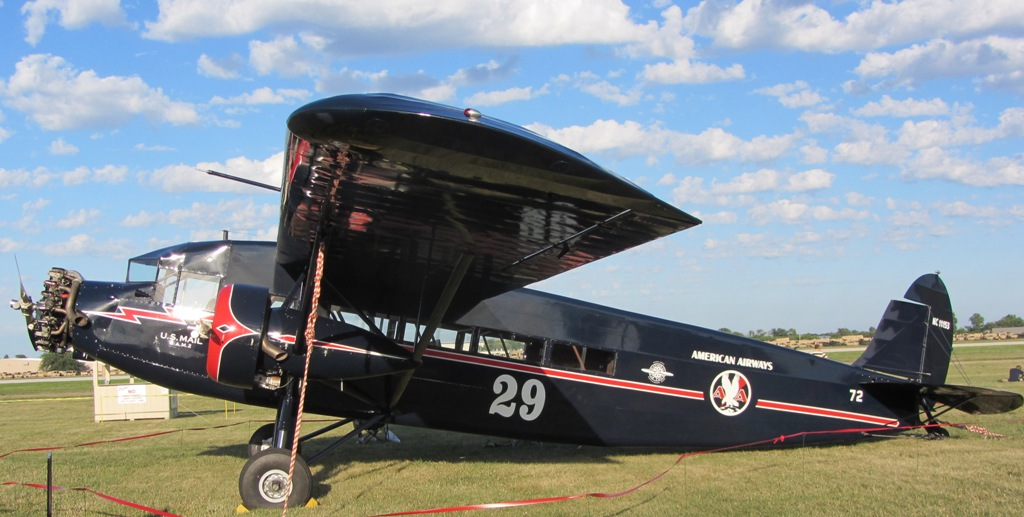
A Stinson A trimotor was flown by Paul Mantz in Arise, My Love .

Filming for Arise, My Love began on June 24, 1940, on the Paramount lot and lasted until mid-August 1940, with the script continuously updated to incorporate actual events, such as the sinking of the SS Athenia and the signing of the armistice between France and Germany in the Forest of Compiègne. The character of Augusta Nash was reputedly based on that of Martha Gellhorn. A triple tribute is paid to director Ernst Lubitsch, mentor of then-screenwriter Billy Wilder, with two songs when Ray Milland starts singing "Lookie, Lookie, Lookie, Here Comes Cookie" (lyrics and music by Mack Gordon, sung by Gary Cooper in Bluebeard's Eighth Wife), then later on Claudette Colbert hums and sings "Dream Lover", (composed by Victor Schertzinger, lyrics by Clifford Grey, originally introduced in The Love Parade), and eventually mentioning the torpedo attack on SS Athenia where Lubitsch’s baby daughter Nicola and her English nurse had been sailing back to America.

A Stinson A trimotor was featured in the film as a Spanish aircraft. Aerial coordinator Paul Mantz flew the aircraft.

== Reception ==
Bosley Crowther, film reviewer for The New York Times considered Arise, My Love a cynical way to exploit the war in Europe: "it is simply a synthetic picture which attempts to give consequence to a pleasant April-in-Paris romance by involving it in the realities of war—but a war which is patently conceived by some one who has been reading headlines in California. Miss Colbert and Mr. Milland are very charming when tête-a-tête. But, with Europe going up in flames around them, they are, paradoxically, not so hot. Same goes for the film." On the review aggregator website Rotten Tomatoes, 71% of 7 critics' reviews are positive.

== Adaptations ==
Arise, My Love was adapted as a radio play on the June 8, 1942, episode of Lux Radio Theater with Milland joined by Loretta Young. It was also presented on the June 1, 1946, episode of Academy Award Theater, with Milland reprising his role.

== Awards and nominations ==
Arise, My Love won the Oscar for Best Story (Benjamin Glazer and Hans Székely), and was nominated for Best Music (Victor Young), Best Cinematography (Charles Lang) and Best Art Direction (Hans Dreier and Robert Usher).
