= Jacques Théry =

French writer

- Born: 6 April 1881; Paris, France
- Died: 29 September 1970 (aged 89); Beausoleil, Alpes-Maritimes, France
- Occupation: Writer
- Years active: 1931–1946 (film)

Jacques Théry (1881–1970) was a French novelist, playwright and screenwriter. He worked in Hollywood during the 1940s. His collaborator Charles Brackett considered him to be an "outspoken, hard-line communist".

== Selected filmography ==
- A Precocious Girl (1934)
- Unripe Fruit (1934)
- Farewell Waltz (1934)
- Song of Farewell (1934)
- Gold (1934)
- A Royal Divorce (1938)
- Arise, My Love (1940)
- Rhythm on the River (1940)
- Joan of Paris (1942)
- The Heavenly Body (1944)
- Yolanda and the Thief (1945)
- To Each His Own (1946)

== Bibliography ==
- Brackett, Charles. "It's the Pictures That Got Small": Charles Brackett on Billy Wilder and Hollywood's Golden Age. Columbia University Press, 2014.
- Goble, Alan. The Complete Index to Literary Sources in Film. Walter de Gruyter, 1999.
