= Doug Wolens =

American filmmaker, writer and producer

- Occupations: Documentary filmmaker, writer and producer

Doug Wolens is an American documentary filmmaker, writer and producer whose documentary films have touched on various issues from logging (Butterfly) to transhumanism (The Singularity).

== Early life ==
Wolens was raised in Chicago, Illinois. His father sold children's wear while his mother worked in an office. He graduated from the University of Oregon in 1981. After graduation, Wolens considered pursuing a MFA in fiction, but his parents only gave him money for graduate school if he studied something 'worthwhile'. Wolens thus studied law at Seton Hall University Law School.

Wolens briefly gave up his creative pursuits to practice business law in New York and San Francisco, California. During this period, Wolens was involved in asbestos litigation.

== Career ==
After his first marriage ended, Wolens realized while practicing law that he still had an urge to write, so he applied to and was accepted at San Francisco University where he took a screenwriting class.

=== Early documentaries and Happy Loving Couples ===
In 1993, Wolens became a filmmaker and his first documentary 'Happy Loving Couples' was screened at the Sundance Film Festival. In Happy Loving Couples, Wolens presents the difficulties of internal monologues of single women in big cities. Happy Loving Couples haunts the narrator by contrasting the difficulties of single women in big cities with the many images of urban locales. Wolens is noted for making Happy Loving Couples a 'personal film' which uses fictional narration as opposed to autobiographical narration.

Two other shorts followed Happy Loving Couples, 'Reversal' in 1994 and 'In Frame' in 1995.

=== Weed ===
Weed, a 1996 film written, directed and produced by Wolens, premiered at the International Documentary Film Festival Amsterdam before going on a forty-day United States theatrical tour. Weed is a documentary about the eight annual Cannabis Cup and in particular about Americans getting high during it. Wolens visited 56 coffeehouses and interviewed 300 people for Weed to get material for the documentary. Wolens documentary on Weed was of particular interest to him since he used to grow pot in the backyard while he was in college.

=== Butterfly ===
Wolens directed the documentary Butterfly. Butterfly describes Julia Hill, a rebellious, anti logging activist who lives in a redwood tree in her effort protest logging. Hill chose Wolens as the only person to document her protests. Wolens became aware of Hill's campaign during a DYI for his documentary Weed. After not being able to get the story out of his head, Wolens contacted Hill and set up the groundwork for the documentary.

=== The Singularity ===
Woolen's next documentary The Singularity is a documentary which questions transhumanism. The Singularity predicts that eventually technology will go beyond what humans can imagine. Wolens first learned about the singularity in 2000 while self distributing the Butterfly. On a chance occasion he read a blurb in an Internet business magazine about how technology would one day be as smart as people. Wolens then read up on the blurb's author (Kurzweil's) book The Age of Spiritual Machines and it inspired him to create the singularity documentary. Wolens used Kurzeil in the film itself, which uses a lot of animated intercut interviews. Wolens also interviewed people not associated with artificial intelligent speculation or biomolecular work such as former US National Security council advisor Richard A Clarke to give a full view of the topic. Wolens didn't have the needed film grants for the film, however he still went around the country talking to various people related to the films topic which led him to question the evolution of technology one interview at a time.

== Personal life ==
Wolens currently resides in San Francisco, California where he is involved with local events.

In 2005, Wolens was a judge for Eureka, California's 5th annual Humboldt Redwood Coast Jazz Festival in 2005.

== Filmography ==
Film/Short	Year	Role
Happy Loving Couples	1993	Director
Reversal	1994	Director
Getting Even with Dad	1994	Production assistant
In Frame	1995	Director
Weed	1996	Director, producer, writer
Butterfly	2000	Director, producer, writer
The Singularity	2012	Director, producer
