= Julia Butterfly Hill =

American environmental activist (born 1974)

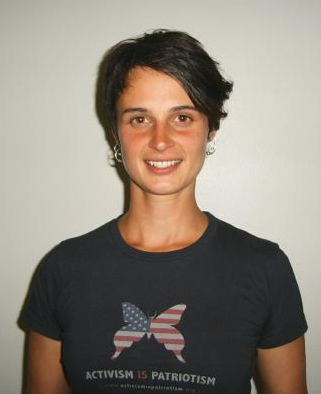
- Hill in 2006
- Born: Julia Lorraine Hill; February 18, 1974 (age 52); Mount Vernon, Missouri, U.S.
- Occupations: Environmental activist; motivational speaker
- Employer: Circle of Life Foundation
- Known for: Living in Luna, a California redwood tree, for 730+ days
- Partner: Raymon Silva
- Website: juliabutterflyhill.com

Julia Lorraine Hill (born February 18, 1974), best known as Julia Butterfly Hill, is an American environmental activist and tax redirection advocate. She lived in a 200-foot (61 m)-tall, approximately 1,000-year-old California redwood tree for 738 days between December 10, 1997, and December 18, 1999. Hill lived in a tent near the top of a tree, affectionately known as Luna, to prevent Pacific Lumber Company loggers from cutting it down. She ultimately reached an agreement with the lumber company to save the tree. Hill is the author of the book The Legacy of Luna (2000) and co-author of One Makes the Difference.

== Pre–tree sit ==
Hill's father was a traveling minister who went from town to town, bringing his family with him. Until she was about ten years old, Hill lived in a 32-foot (9.8 m) camper with her father Dale, mother Kathy, and brothers Mike and Dan. Julia is the middle child. While traveling with her family, Hill often explored rivers by campgrounds. When Hill was seven years old, she and her family were taking a hike one day when a butterfly landed on her finger and stayed with her for the duration of the hike. From that day on, her nickname became "Butterfly". She decided to use that as her nickname for the rest of her life.

When Hill was in middle school, her family stopped traveling and settled in Jonesboro, Arkansas. In August 1996, at age 22, she suffered a near-fatal car crash. At the time, Hill was acting as the designated driver for a friend who had been drinking. Her friend's car was hit from behind by a drunk driver. The steering wheel of the car penetrated her skull. It took almost a year of intensive therapy before she regained the ability to speak and walk normally. She said:

As I recovered, I realized that my whole life had been out of balance... I had graduated high school at 16, and had been working nonstop since then, first as a waitress, then as a restaurant manager. I had been obsessed by my career, success, and material things. The crash woke me up to the importance of the moment, and doing whatever I could to make a positive impact on the future. The steering wheel in my head, both figuratively and literally, steered me in a new direction in my life.

Hill embarked on a spiritual quest afterward, leading her to the environmental cause opposed to the destruction of the redwood forests in Humboldt County, California.

== Tree sit ==
After recuperating from her accident, Hill took a road trip to California and attended a reggae fundraiser to save the forests. A group of "front-liners" had been rotating tree sitters in and out of giant redwoods in Humboldt County every couple of days to stave off Pacific Lumber Co. loggers who were clear-cutting. The trees were on a windswept ridge overlooking the community of Stafford, which is south of Scotia. On New Year's Eve 1996, a landslide in Stafford caused by clearcut logging by Pacific Lumber Company (Maxxam) on steep slopes above the community resulted in most of the community being buried up to 17 feet (5.2 m) in mud and tree debris; eight homes were completely destroyed. Organizers wanted someone to stay in the tree for one week. "Nobody else would volunteer so they had to pick me", said Hill.

Originally, Hill was not officially affiliated with any environmental organization, deciding by herself to undertake civil disobedience. Soon, she was actively supported by Earth First!, among other organizations, and by volunteers. On December 10, 1997, Hill ascended a 1,000-year-old lightning-struck redwood tree to a height of 180 feet (55 m). The tree had previously been nicknamed “the Stafford Giant" because of its proximity to the small community of Stafford. Since the Moon was rising at the time, activists chose to name the tree “Luna” (Spanish for “Moon”) to commemorate the event:

An hour and a half after reaching the base of the tree, we got the last of the provisions up. By then it was midnight. Finally, I was able to put on the harness and ascend Luna. It seemed an exhausting eternity before I reached the top. When I finally got there, I untangled myself from the harness and looked around for a place to collapse.

Hill lived on two 6-by-4-foot (1.8 by 1.2 m) platforms for 738 days. She learned many survival skills while living in Luna, such as "seldom washing the soles of her feet, because the sap helped her feet stick to the branches better." She used solar-powered cell phones for radio interviews, became an "in-tree" correspondent for a cable television show, and hosted TV crews to protest old-growth clear cutting. Using ropes, Hill hoisted up survival supplies brought by an eight-member support crew. To keep warm, she wrapped herself tight in a sleeping bag, leaving only a small hole for breathing. For meals, she used a single-burner propane stove. Throughout her ordeal, she weathered freezing rains and 40 mph (64 km/h) winds from El Niño, helicopter harassment, a ten-day siege by company security guards and attempts at intimidation by angry loggers.

A resolution was reached in 1999, when the Pacific Lumber Company agreed to preserve Luna and all trees within a 200-foot (61 m) buffer zone. In exchange, it was agreed that Hill would vacate the tree, and that the $50,000 she and other activists had raised during her occupancy would be given to the logging company. The agreement also provided that the company would donate that same amount to Cal Poly Humboldt for research into sustainable forestry practices.

Vandals later cut into the tree with a chainsaw. A gash in the 200-foot (61 m)-tall redwood was discovered in November 2000 by one of Hill's supporters. Observers at the scene said the cut measured 32 inches (810 mm) deep and 19 feet (5.8 m) around the base, somewhat less than half the circumference of the tree. The gash was treated with an herbal remedy, and the tree was stabilized with steel cables. In 2001, Eureka civil engineer Steve Salzman headed Luna's "medical team" which designed and built a bracing system to help the tree withstand the extreme windstorms with peak winds between 60 and 100 miles per hour (27 and 45 m/s). They were assisted by Cal Poly Humboldt professor Steven Sillett. As of spring 2007, the tree was doing well with new growth each year. Caretakers routinely climb the tree to check its condition and to maintain the steel guywires. Luna is under the stewardship of Sanctuary Forest, a nonprofit organization.

== Post–tree sit ==
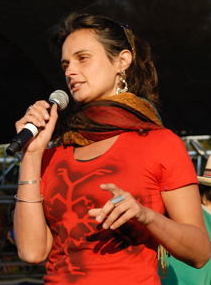
Hill speaking at the Harmony Festival in 2009

Since her tree sit, Hill has become a motivational speaker, an author, and the co-founder of the Circle of Life Foundation (which helped organize We the Planet, an eco-friendly music tour) and the Engage Network, a nonprofit that trains small groups of civic leaders to work toward social change.

=== Ecuadorian oil pipeline protest ===
On July 16, 2002, Hill was jailed in Quito, Ecuador, outside the offices of Occidental Petroleum, for protesting a proposed oil pipeline that would penetrate a virgin Andean cloud forest that teems with rare birds. Ecuadorian President Gustavo Noboa commented, "The little gringos have been arrested, including the old cockatoo who climbs trees." Hill was later deported from Ecuador.

=== Tax redirection ===
In 2003, Hill became a proponent of tax redirection, resisting payment of about $150,000 in federal taxes, donating the money to after-school programs, arts and cultural programs, community gardens, programs for Native Americans, alternatives to incarceration, and environmental protection programs. She said:

I actually take the money that the IRS says goes to them and I give it to the places where our taxes should be going. And in my letter to the IRS I said: "I'm not refusing to pay my taxes. I'm actually paying them but I'm paying them where they belong because you refuse to do so."

In a 2012 interview, Hill said the unpaid tax liability was approximately $175,000. After various penalties and interest, the government claimed she owed more than $400,000. Hill also stated that the IRS had pursued collection efforts and that she had appeared in tax court twice, although no criminal charges had been filed against her at that time.

=== Farm sale protest ===
In 2006, Hill protested the sale of the South Central Farm in an attempt to save the 14-acre (5.7 ha) farm from developers.

=== Pasadena Unified School District tree sit ===
In June 2026, a group of people occupied trees at John Muir High School to protest the removal of more than 100 trees. 17-year-old Pasadena resident Paloma Muniz-Ochoa tagged Hill in a social media post which inspired Hill to travel to Pasadena and support the tree sitters.

== In popular culture ==
Hill has been the subject of several documentaries, interviews, and books, including her own 2000 memoir, The Legacy of Luna, and has influenced numerous musicians:

- On December 10, 1998, a benefit concert was played at the Mateel Community Center in Redway, California, during Julia's "tree sit". Artists performing were Bob Weir and Mark Karan as an acoustic duet, the Steve Kimock Band, and the Mickey Hart Band. Hill took part in the event, reading her poem "Luna" via telephone while the Mickey Hart Band was performing "The Dancing Sorcerer".
- The character Sierra Tierwater in the 2000 novel A Friend of the Earth by T. Coraghessan Boyle was partially inspired by Hill.
- Hill was the subject of the documentary Butterfly (2000) broadcast on PBS POV. She is also featured in the documentary film Tree-Sit: The Art of Resistance. Both films document her time in the redwood tree.
- The 2000 twelfth-season episode of The Simpsons called "Lisa the Tree Hugger" was conceived when writer Matt Selman heard a news story about Hill.
- In Gilmore Girls Season 3 Episode 8 aired in November 2002, Rory asks Dean if he remembers "that girl Butterfly who lived in a tree for a year", and then continues, "I can officially attest that she was nuts."
- In 2002 children's book Judy Moody Saves the World, Judy Moody looks up to Hill as an activist.
- In Penn & Teller's 2003 first season of their documentary television show, Bullshit, Hill appeared as a Special Guest Expert on the episode "Environmental Hysteria".
- A film adaptation of The Legacy of Luna, to be directed by Laurie Collyer and star Rachel Weisz, became stuck in development hell, although Weisz actively worked towards getting the project off the ground.
- Hill and the events were featured in the 2010 Michael P. Henning documentary film Hempsters: Plant the Seed.
- The children's book, Luna and Me: The True Story of a Girl Who Lived in a Tree to Save a Forest, by Jenny Sue Kostecki-Shaw, published in 2015, is a retelling of her time in Luna.
- The main character of the 2017 Swedish children's book Julia räddar skogen (Julia saves the forest) by Niklas Hill and Anna Palmqvist is named after Hill. The book is about a child who occupies a tree in order to hinder the construction of a new highway.
- In The Overstory by Richard Powers, the character Olivia Vandergriff is loosely based on Hill.

=== Music ===
- Trey Anastasio and Tom Marshall wrote a song called "Kissed by Mist" about Hill.
- In 2002, Los Suaves made a song in honor of Hill called "Julia Hill" on the Un paso atrás album in which the singer is "Luna".
- The Red Hot Chili Peppers 2003 song "Can't Stop" contains the line "J. Butterfly is in the treetop".
- Neil Young made a reference to Hill in the 2003 song "Sun Green" on the Greendale album in which the title character: "Still wants to meet Julia Butterfly".
- Casey Desmond wrote a song called "Julia Butterfly Hill" which appeared on her 2006 album No Disguise.
- In 2009, Idina Menzel wrote a song entitled "Butterfly" referring to Hill's concern for the environment.
- The musical Redwood, inspired by Hill, premiered in 2024 at the La Jolla Playhouse in California and opened on Broadway on February 13, 2025.
