= No Time for Love (1943 film) =

1943 film by Mitchell Leisen

- Theatrical release poster
- Directed by: Mitchell Leisen
- Written by: Warren Duff (adaptation)
- Screenplay by: Claude Binyon
- Story by: Robert Lees; Frederic I. Rinaldo
- Produced by: Mitchell Leisen
- Starring: Claudette Colbert; Fred MacMurray
- Cinematography: Charles Lang
- Edited by: Alma Macrorie
- Music by: Victor Young
- Production company: Paramount Pictures
- Distributed by: Paramount Pictures
- Release date: January 1943 (USA)
- Running time: 83 minutes
- Country: United States
- Language: English

No Time for Love is a 1943 American screwball comedy film produced and directed by Mitchell Leisen and starring Claudette Colbert and Fred MacMurray. Written by Claude Binyon, Robert Lees, and Frederic I. Rinaldo, the film is about a sophisticated female photographer assigned to photograph the tough "sandhog" construction workers at a tunnel project site. After saving one of the sandhogs from a fatal accident, she becomes attracted to this cocky well-built man they call Superman. Unsettled by her feelings, she hires the man as her assistant, believing that her attraction to him will diminish if she spends time with him. Their time together, however, leads to feelings of love, and she struggles to overcome her haughtiness and make her true feelings known.

No Time for Love was the fourth of seven films starring Colbert and MacMurray, both of whom had previously worked with director Mitchell Leisen. The film was shot at Paramount Studios from June 8 to July 24, 1942. A special set was constructed for the tunnel scenes, based on blueprints for the Brooklyn–Battery Tunnel. A special mix of adobe and water was used to produce the mud in the climactic scenes. No Time for Love was released by Paramount Pictures on November 10, 1943, in New York City. The film received good reviews in Variety and the New York Times, whose reviewer called it a "delightful comedy" and "a thoroughly ingratiating film". The film was nominated for the Academy Award for Best Art Direction–Interior Decoration, Black-and-White (Hans Dreier, Robert Usher, Samuel M. Comer).

== Plot ==
Mirror magazine's top photographer Katherine Grant (Claudette Colbert) is assigned to photograph the Interborough Vehicular River Tunnel project in New York City. Wearing a hardhat and boots, the beautiful photographer is taken underground to the construction site where she is not greeted warmly by the superstitious tunnel workers, called "sandhogs", who believe that women in the tunnel bring bad luck. When she sneaks closer to the drilling point to get a better view, her presence distracts some of the workers and causes an accident that nearly kills Jim Ryan (Fred MacMurray), the cocky well-built sandhog they call "Superman". When she sees the unconscious Ryan about to be crushed by a machine, she drags him to safety.

Later in the compression chamber, a revived Ryan gets into a fistfight with his co-workers after they taunt him about being saved by a woman. During the brawl, Katherine photographs Ryan as he's beating up the other sandhogs. On their way out of the tunnel, Ryan notices that Katherine is flirting with him and tells her he's not interested. Insulted by the brush off, she informs him that she has a boudoir chair with more integrity than he has.

Back at home, Katherine shows her photographs to her sister Hoppy (Ilka Chase) and their snobbish sophisticated friends—her effete suitor and Mirror publisher Henry Fulton (Paul McGrath), playwright Dunbar (Morton Lowry), and composer Roger Winant (Richard Haydn)—who make fun of the brawling "ape". Just then, Ryan arrives at Katherine's apartment to return the tripod she left behind and demands to see the "chaiah" that has more integrity than he does. Unimpressed, Ryan kisses a flustered Katherine flush on the lips and then dismisses her, having regained his confidence. Before he leaves, Ryan is approached by Henry and Dunbar who demand that he provide details of his heroic fistfight; picking up on their condescension, Ryan reenacts the fight, roughing them up in the process.

In the coming weeks, Katherine is haunted by pleasant dreams of Ryan as a superhero rescuing her from Henry as an evil assailant. Meanwhile, Ryan loses his job after Henry publishes the photograph of the sandhogs fighting. When Ryan shows up at her apartment, Katherine assures him she did not know the photo would be published, and offers him a job as her assistant to offset his lost wages. Thinking that if she spends time with him, she will prove to herself that he is not worthy of her. They go on several assignments together, and despite his flirtations with various cheap blondes, Katherine eventually falls in love with Ryan who returns her feelings. One night after sharing a passionate kiss, they are spotted by Hoppy who reveals Katherine's original plan to get him off her mind. Feeling that he's been used, Ryan walks away disgusted.

Sometime later, the tunnel project is threatened by repeated cave-ins resulting from the constant flow of "muck" coming in from the riverbed. The project's one hope at stabilizing the muck is a new machine and chemical process invented by Ryan—an engineer—who was working as a sandhog to better understand the problems of underwater construction. Assigned to cover the testing of this new machine, Katherine returns to the tunnel and is shocked to learn that the inventor is Ryan. She sneaks into the testing area and finds a good vantage point, while Ryan and the sandhogs start up the machine and remove some planks holding back the muck. At first the test appears to fail, but as Katherine takes several photographs, the chemical reaction begins to solidify the muck. Just then a breach of the upper wall creates a muck-slide that nearly buries Katherine. Ryan and the others abandon the machine to save her. Afterwards, the officials declare Ryan's test a failure.

After everyone leaves, Katherine convinces Roger and one of the sandhogs to accompany her back into the tunnel to retrieve the camera, which she believes can prove that the machine was working. They find the camera and indeed the photos show that the muck flow was stopping when the breach occurred. When she shows her proof to the city officials, they agree to move forward with the project under Ryan's leadership, accepting Katherine's condition that Ryan never know that she was responsible for the decision. Believing that Ryan will never forgive her for all the trouble she's caused, she accepts Henry's marriage proposal.

Knowing that Katherine is still in love with Ryan, Roger visits him at his office and reveals her plan to marry Henry, despite her true feelings for Ryan. Darlene, one of Ryan's showgirl acquaintances overhears and goes to Katherine's apartment, barges into her engagement party, and warns her to stay away from Ryan. When she slaps her, Katherine responds by knocking her off her feet with one punch just as Ryan arrives. Ryan takes Katherine and Henry into her bedroom. Holding up Henry with one hand and the "chair" with the other, he asks her to choose. When she chooses Ryan, he picks her up, throws her over his shoulder, and proudly walks off to get married.

== Cast ==
- Claudette Colbert as Katherine Grant
- Fred MacMurray as Jim Ryan
- Ilka Chase as Hoppy Grant
- Richard Haydn as Roger Winant
- Paul McGrath as Henry Fulton
- June Havoc as Darlene
- Marjorie Gateson as Sophie

== Production ==
=== Screenplay ===
The screenplay for No Time for Love was written by Claude Binyon, based on a story by Robert Lees and Frederic I. Rinaldo. The Katherine Grant character is based on Margaret Bourke-White, Life magazine's first female photojournalist, whose stylized photos of industrial subjects were featured in Life's premiere issue, initiating a new era of photojournalism.

=== Casting ===
Oscar Levant was originally cast for the role of Roger, but when filming was delayed he was forced to withdraw due to other commitments. Rita Hayworth was originally cast as Katherine, but also had to withdraw when production was delayed by eighteen months.

Claudette Colbert and Fred MacMurray were finally cast in the lead roles. They co-starred together in seven films between 1935 and 1948. No Time for Love was their fourth film together. Both actors had worked with director Mitchell Leisen on a number of other films—MacMurray made a total of nine films with him, and Colbert four. Colbert also worked with Leisen when he was a costume designer on Cecil B. DeMille's epic film The Sign of the Cross (1932). Leisen would later remember No Time for Love as a "happy collaboration":

Fred and Claudette worked so wonderfully together. Many times when I was setting up the next scene, they'd go off in a corner and work it up themselves. They'd show me how they wanted to do it and it would be just right ... they were talented natural performers and I wanted them to do it in a way that was comfortable for them.

Due to the restricted use of film stock during the war years, the actors rehearsed extensively throughout the filming to avoid multiple takes. Many of the scenes that ended up in the film were first takes.

=== Filming ===
Principal photography lasted from June 8 to July 24, 1942. Charles Wall and Edward Sanell from the New York Tunnel Authority served as technical advisors for the film. The New York Tunnel Authority also provided Paramount blueprints for the Brooklyn–Battery Tunnel. The film was shot at Paramount Studios at 5555 Melrose Avenue in Hollywood, California. The 25-foot long tunnel set was constructed on Paramount's largest stage, and was filled with mud for the climactic scene. To avoid using real mud, set designers experimented with several combinations of material, eventually using adobe and water. A cement mixer was installed on the set to produce the correct consistency. Leisen later recalled, "I never asked the actors to do anything I wouldn't do, so on our first day in the tunnel, I dove right into the mud, head first. I came up and said, 'All right, let's go.'" After Colbert's first take in the mud, she emerged without any mud on her face. "I said, 'Come here, honey,' and took a handful of the mud and slapped it on her face. She went right back in and did it again."

During the war years, austerity measures limited the amount of money producers could spend on construction materials. To stay within budget, Leisen leveraged one of the sets from Colbert's previous film, The Palm Beach Story (1942), which were still standing at Paramount, and transformed it into Colbert's bedroom in No Time for Love. Colbert's dream sequence utilized a minimal set.

== Critical response ==
In his review for the New York Times, Bosley Crowther called the film a "delightful comedy" and "a thoroughly ingratiating film". While the film presents a simple boy-girl plot grounded in the basic law that opposites attract, director Mitchell Leisen is able to fashion an entertaining movie through the "clever application of the simple mechanics of the screen" and with action that illustrates this elemental theme. Crowther concludes:

The whole is resolved in a normal boy-gets-girl-happily way, which, although the weakest part of the picture, is a swift and classic means to an end. As a matter of fact, the construction and the elemental nature of the theme might be recognized by the more perceptive as a satire on boy-girl films. And it is this side of humor in the dialogue and in the piquant direction throughout which elevates the film to the level of spicy, adult comedy. Claudette Colbert and Fred MacMurray are the clashing girl and boy in the case, and it is largely through their crisp playing that the chemical elements finally jell.

The reviewer for Variety called it an "escapist" film that was "heavily loaded with laughs". The reviewer praised Mitchell Leisen's production and direction, the "capital" performances of Colbert and MacMurray, and Claude Binyon's screenplay with its "sufficiency of crack dialog—and the laughs that go with it".

The film's appeal has not wavered much for subsequent generations. In 2009, the film was reissued as part of the Claudette Colbert Collection DVD box set. In his review of the film, Glenn Erickson called it "83 fast minutes of very funny comedy". He also praised the film for its handling of sex roles.

What's interesting is the film's clever play with sex typing. Katherine is surrounded by cultured but sexless male drones. When he feels he's being slighted, the virile Jim Ryan gets away with literally knocking their heads together. Katherine hires a muscle-bound model for a photo shoot, and Ryan can't resist beating him up as well. That the Ryan character doesn't come off as a boor can only be credited to MacMurray's personality, and the fact that Ryan is toying with Katherine. He knows she's trying to play a game with him.

Erickson also praised the impressive tunnel scenes and Katherine's surreal dream sequence, which effectively demonstrates her secret desire to be swept off her feet by a macho he-man and saved from her effete male suitor. Erickson concluded that No Time for Love is "both funny and clever at all times".

== Accolades ==
No Time for Love was nominated for the Oscar for Best Art Direction–Interior Decoration, Black-and-White (Hans Dreier, Robert Usher, Samuel M. Comer) during the 17th Academy Awards. The award, however, went to Gaslight (Art Direction: Cedric Gibbons and William Ferrari; Interior Decoration: Paul Huldschinsky and Edwin B. Willis).
