= Luna (tree) =

Coast redwood tree protected by environmental activists in California

Coordinates: 40°26′18″N 124°3′10″W

- Interactive map of Luna (tree)
- Species: Coast Redwood; Sequoia sempervirens
- Location: Humboldt County, California
- Height: 200 feet; 61 meters
- Diameter: 12 feet; 3.6 meters
- Volume of trunk: 37,000ft³; 1048m³

Luna is a 1,000-year-old, 200-foot-tall (61 m) coast redwood tree located near the community of Stafford in Humboldt County, California, which was occupied for 738 days by forest activist Julia Butterfly Hill and saved by an agreement between Hill and the Pacific Lumber Company. The tree was vandalized about a year after the agreement but was repaired and survived.

The coast redwood species is monoecious, with pollen and seed cones on the same plant.

== Location ==
Luna is located on a windswept ridge overlooking the community of Stafford, north of Scotia. Due to its proximity to the small community of Stafford, this tree has also been referred to as the "Stafford Giant".

Despite some news reports to the contrary, Luna is not located in the Headwaters Forest Reserve, a preserved old growth forest.

On New Year's Eve 1996, a landslide in Stafford caused by clearcut logging by Pacific Lumber Company (Maxxam) on steep slopes above the community resulted in most of the community being buried up to 17 feet (5.2 m) in mud and tree debris; eight homes were completely destroyed.

== History ==
The 1,000-year-old lightning-struck tree was named by a group of Earth First! members, who built a small platform from salvaged wood to serve as a tree-sit platform. As the moon was rising at the time, they chose the name Luna, the Spanish word for moon, to commemorate the event.

For 738 days, from December 10, 1997, to December 18, 1999, forest activist Julia Butterfly Hill lived on the platform in the tree, 180 feet (55 m) above the ground. Hill occupied Luna in order to save it and the surrounding grove from being clear-cut by the Pacific Lumber Company (owned by Maxxam, Inc. and Charles Hurwitz). The Pacific Lumber Company and Hill reached an agreement to save the tree and a 200 feet (61 m) buffer zone around it for $50,000 after which Hill left the tree. Later she wrote a book called The Legacy of Luna about her experiences treesitting in the giant redwood. Some of her predictions came true, as Maxxam, Inc. failed in bankruptcy after cutting a 100-year timber reserve in 20 years, leaving employees and suppliers in the lurch.

In November 2000, an unknown vandal used a chainsaw to cut halfway through the tree. In 2001, Eureka civil engineer Steve Salzman headed Luna's "medical team" which designed and built a bracing system to help the tree withstand the extreme windstorms with peak winds between 60 and 100 miles per hour (100 and 160 km/h). They were assisted by Cal Poly Humboldt professor Steven Sillett.

In early 2002, naturalist Paul Donahue noted that Luna had survived the cut. Luna is currently under the stewardship of Sanctuary Forest, a nonprofit organization.

== See also ==
- The Legacy of Luna, Hill's 2000 memoirs about her efforts to save the tree
- Butterfly, a 2000 documentary film about Hill's campaign
- List of individual trees
