= Butterfly (2000 film) =

- Directed by: Doug Wolens
- Starring: Julia Butterfly Hill; Luna
- Country of origin: United States
- Original language: English

Production
- Producer: Doug Wolens
- Editors: Zack Bennett; Doug Wolens
- Running time: 79 minutes

Original release
- Release: June 2000

Butterfly is a documentary film directed by Doug Wolens about the environmental campaigner and tree sitter Julia Butterfly Hill who gained the attention of the world for her two-year vigil 180 feet atop Luna, an ancient redwood tree preventing it from being clear-cut. The film first aired on PBS in 2000.

== Cast ==
- Julia Hill acts as herself

== See also ==
- The Legacy of Luna, Hill's 2000 memoir
