= The Singularity (film) =

2012 film

- Film poster
- Directed by: Doug Wolens
- Produced by: Doug Wolens
- Release date: November 1, 2012
- Running time: 76 minutes
- Country: United States
- Language: English

The Singularity is a 2012 documentary film about the technological singularity, produced and directed by Doug Wolens. The film has been called "a large-scale achievement in its documentation of futurist and counter-futurist ideas”.

== Synopsis ==
Doug Wolens organized his interviews with the commentators (see list below) by this set of topics, related to the singularity. During each topic or subtopic several commentators provide their viewpoints, some with suggestions on how to get there, others with a skeptical opinion about when it will happen.

- Topic I. Artificial intelligence
  - Subtopic: Intelligence explosion
  - Subtopic: Machines That Think
  - Subtopic: Conscious machines
- Topic II. Becoming machines
  - Subtopic: Neuroengineering
  - Subtopic: Nanotechnology
- Topic III. Techno-utopia –
  - Subtopic: Getting Ready
  - Subtopic: Is The Singularity Near?
  - Subtopic: Regulating technology
- Topic IV. Post-human – Transcend

== Commentators ==
In order of their appearance in the film:

- Ray Kurzweil – National Medal of Technology recipient, Inventor
- Ralph Merkle – Institute for Molecular Manufacturing / Senior Research Fellow
- Brad Templeton – Electronic Frontier Foundation Director
- Jonas Lamis – Technology Entrepreneur, Founder and Chief Operating Officer at Rally
- Paul Saffo – Distinguished Visiting Scholar at Stanford University
- Eliezer Yudkowsky – Singularity Institute for Artificial Intelligence, Co-founder
- Peter Voss – Adaptive AI, Inc / Founder and CEO
- Ben Goertzel – Novamente LLC, Artificial Intelligence Development, Founder
- Chris Phoenix – Center for Responsible Nanotechnology Co-founder
- Peter Norvig – Google, Director of Research
- Alison Gopnik – Professor of Psychology and Philosophy at University of California Berkeley
- David Chalmers – Centre for Consciousness, Director and Professor Philosophy
- Wolf Singer – Max Planck Institute for Brain Research, Director
- Christof Koch – California Institute of Technology, Professor of Cognitive and Behavioral Biology
- Christine Peterson – Foresight Nanotech Institute, President and Co-founder
- Andy Clark – University of Edinburgh, Professor of Philosophy
- Barney Pell – Bing/Microsoft Chief Architect for local search
- Cynthia Breazeal – MIT Media Lab's Personal Robots Group, Director
- Bill McKibben – Scholar in Residence – Middlebury College
- Richard A. Clarke
- Matt Francis – UC Berkeley / Professor of Chemistry
- David D. Friedman – Economist / Professor of Law at Santa Clara University
- Leon Panetta – United States Secretary of Defense
- Aubrey de Grey
- Glenn Zorpette – Executive Editor of IEEE Spectrum

== Music ==
American composer Christopher (“Chrizzy”) Lancaster scored the original soundtrack for the film. The soundtrack was created by the processing of acoustic cello sound through real-time samplers, audio effects and filtering recording his cello and feedback.

== Release ==
The Singularity had limited theatrical release beginning with the 1400 seat Castro Theatre in San Francisco, California, in September 2013, along with screening at the Brattle Theatre in Cambridge, Massachusetts, the Smith Rafael Film Center in Marin County, California, and The Santa Fe Center for Contemporary Arts in Santa Fe, New Mexico. The film has also had screenings at Yale University, University of Edinburgh, Arizona State University, NASA, BIL, and others. These screenings featured post-screening discussion with expert panels, and/or question and answer sessions with director Doug Wolens.

Doug Wolens has pursued an alternative self-distribution strategy for The Singularity, working directly with theatres, museums, educational institutions, as well as with the national and local press, to promote the screenings and iTunes December, 2012 digital release.

== Reception ==
Stephen Cass of the IEEE Spectrum called it "a lively introduction" that does not cover new ground. Geoff Pevere of The Globe and Mail wrote that the film, an "intense, idea-packed account" of the concept, casts McKibben as the most compelling speaker, as his arguments come across the most human, appealing not only to reason but also feeling. Alex Knapp of Forbes wrote that it is "well done and provides a good overview", though he said he would have liked to have seen more criticism of the basic tenet of exponential technological growth. The interviewees themselves also attracted commentary; Case asked why there were no non-white subjects, and Pevere described them as "neo-hippie, unkempt longhairs".
