= Circle of Life Foundation =

American environmental nonprofit organization

- Established: December 1999 (27 years ago)
- Founders: Julia Butterfly Hill
- Founded at: Humboldt County
- Types: environmental organization
- Employees: 0 (2010s)
- Website: www.circleoflife.org

Circle of Life was founded by Julia Butterfly Hill. The US-based organization counts a number of celebrities and west-coast business leaders as supporters, advisors, and backers.
