= Tree sitting =

Occupying trees as a political protest

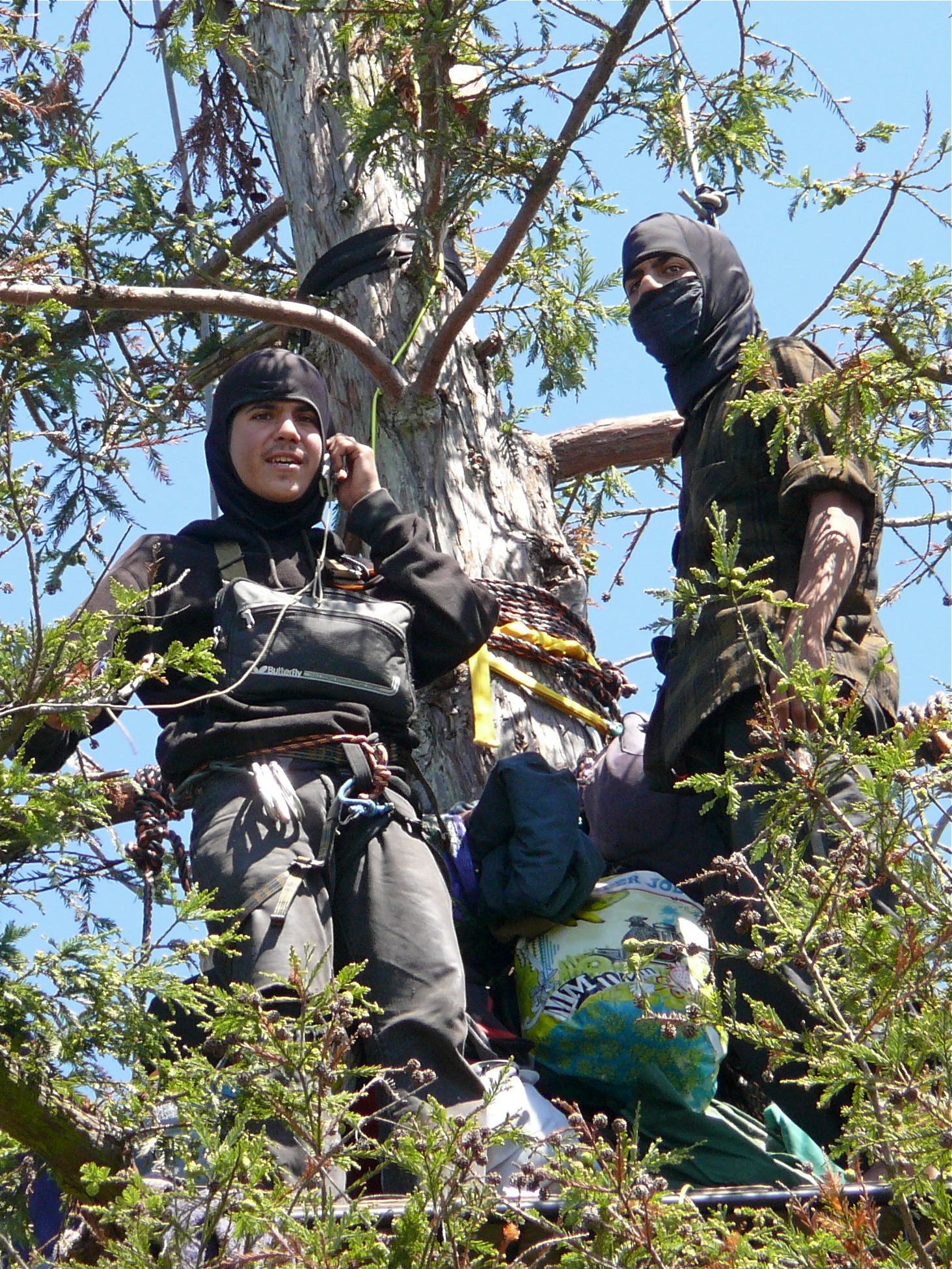
Demonstrators in a tree at the Berkeley oak grove protest in 2008

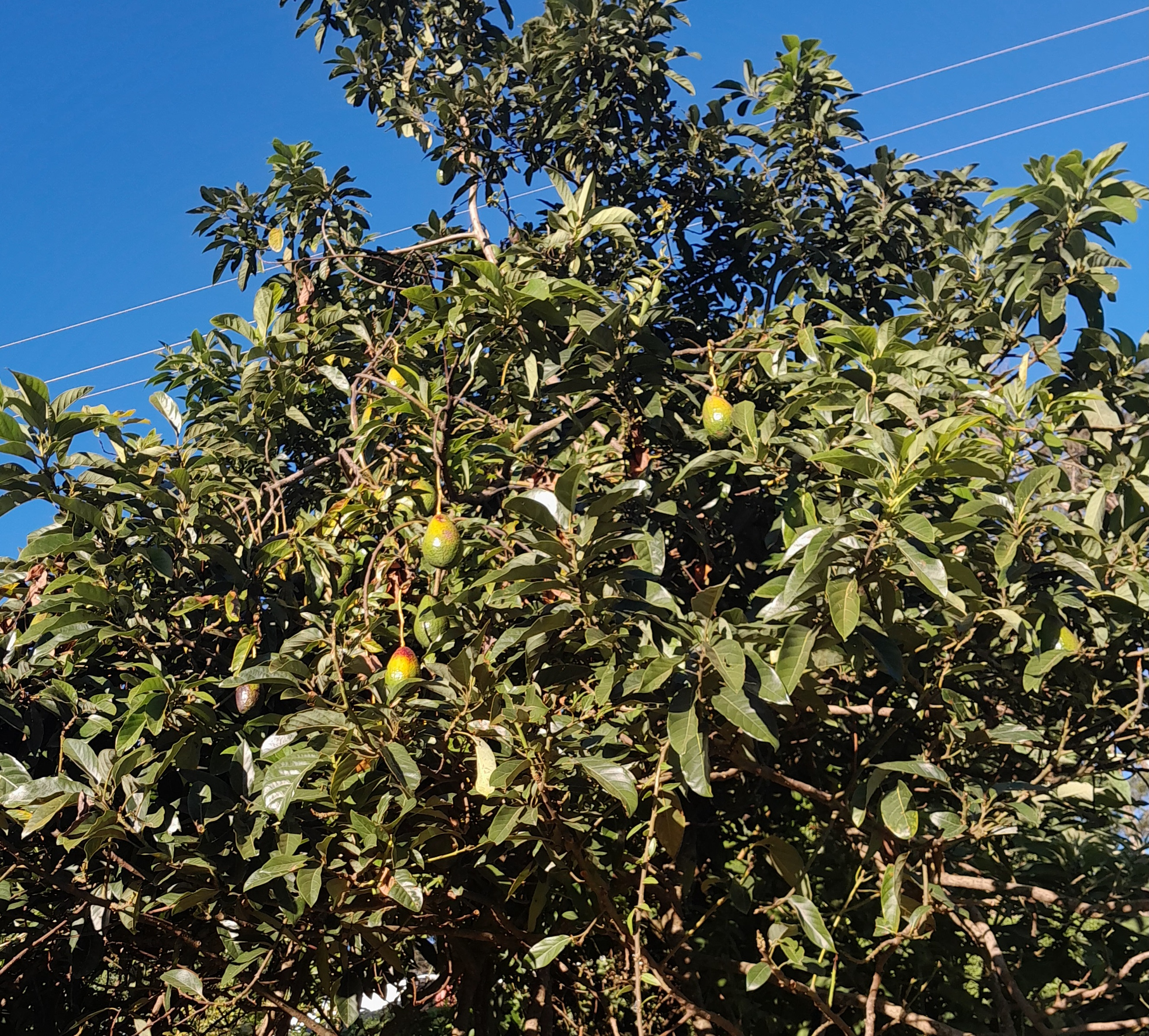
Avo tree

Tree sitting is a form of environmentalist civil disobedience in which a protester sits in a tree, usually on a small platform built for the purpose, to protect it from being cut down (speculating that loggers will not endanger human lives by felling an occupied tree). Supporters usually provide the tree sitters with food and other supplies.

== About ==
Tree sitting is a strategy that provides a high level of public attention since it is considered to be very dangerous and requires highly skilled police officers to evict the sitters. Tree sitting is often used as a stalling tactic, to prevent the cutting of trees while lawyers fight in the courts to secure long-term victories.

Tree-sitting was once a children's pastime. In the early 1930s, when endurance contests were common across the U.S., it became a child's contest for kids to climb into their backyard trees and, serviced by siblings and local businesses, attempt to win prizes for the longest sit.

== Extractions ==
Tree-sitters in trees claimed by Pacific Lumber in Humboldt County have been subject to forced removal by hired extractors. The practice started with a single extractor in the late 1990s; however, in 2003, Pacific Lumber hired teams of climbers to remove dozens of tree-sitters, particularly in the Freshwater area East of Eureka, California.

Most of the extractions in Northern California are done under the leadership of Eric Schatz of Schatz Tree Service, a well known professional arborist.

== List of tree sits ==
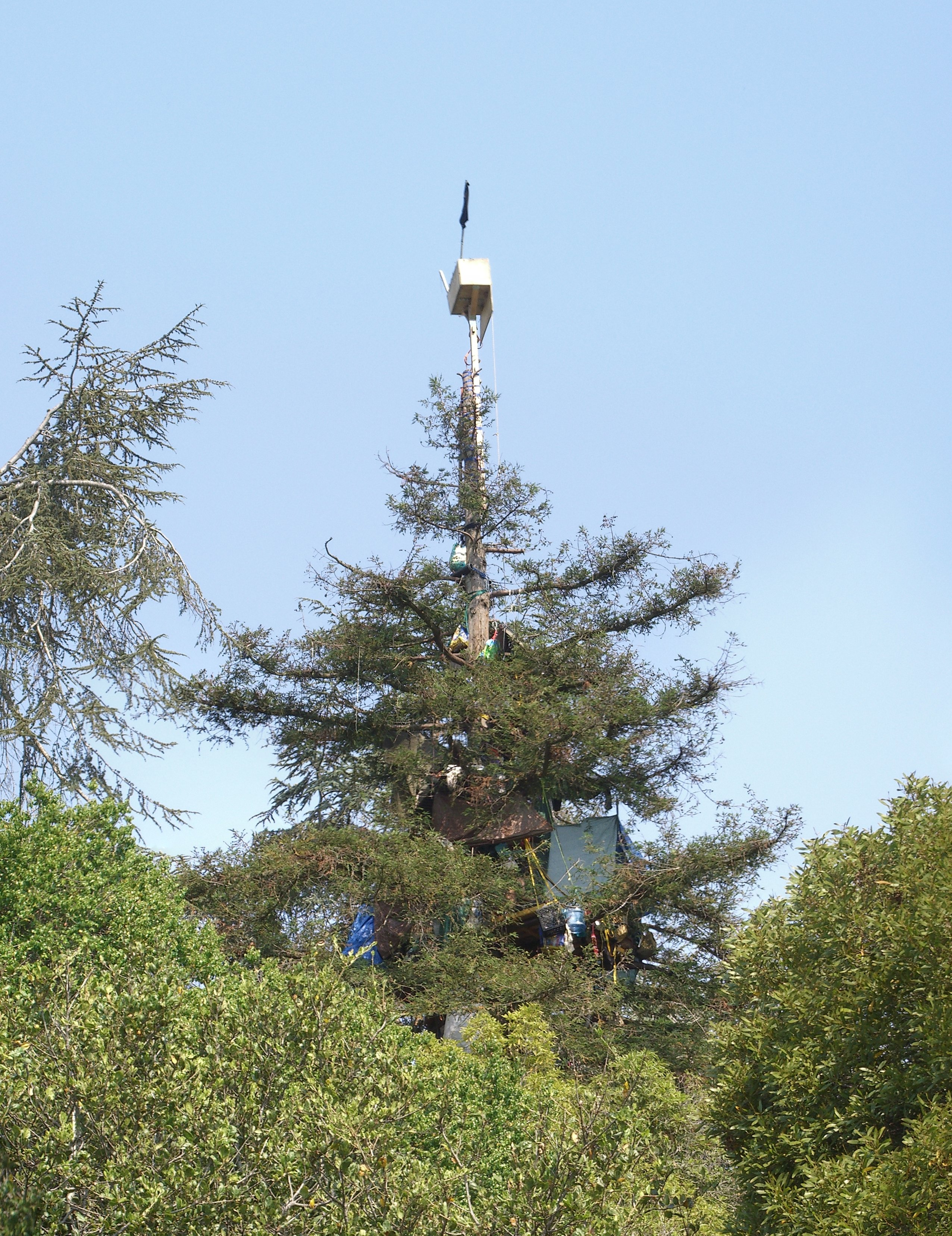
The tree-sitters' camp in Berkeley, California, protesting the planned removal of coastal live oaks. The protesters were in the trees from December 2, 2006, to September 9, 2008, making it the longest-running urban tree-sit in history.

Some of the more notable tree sittings include:

=== Australia ===
- In December 1983, the Nomadic Action Group (NAG) climbed trees to block work on the controversial Cape Tribulation to Bloomfield Road in North Queensland, Australia. When work resumed in August 1984, obstruction of road construction continued over a two-week period. Making use of hammocks, protesters were able to remain aloft, some for as long as a week at a time.
- In 1986 and 1987, the Tasmanian Wilderness Society (TWS) obstructed logging operations at Farmhouse Creek in the Tasmanian South West Wilderness with tree sitters on wooden platforms. Tree platforms were later used on the Australian mainland during the South East Forests New South Wales campaign in Nullica State Forest (April–August 1989). Later in this campaign tree platforms in Coolangubra State Forest were erected to impede construction of the Wog Way and Kanoonah logging roads; those at Wog Way were occupied in continuous shifts from the beginning of September 1989 until October 1990.
- In 1995, tree sitting took place during a blockade of logging at Jane Block in Western Australia before litigation protected the area.
- In 2004, at least six tree sits were erected in Tuart trees at Ludlow Tuart Forest near Busselton in South Western, Western Australia.
- In 2004, activists from Greenpeace and the Australian environmental organization The Wilderness Society held the record for the world's highest tree-sit at 65m, in the Styx Valley, Tasmania. Peter (Peck) Firth spent 51 days up a giant Eucalyptus tree nicknamed Gandalf's Staff.
- In 2006, two sits were built in Jarrah (Eucalyptus) trees at "Arcadia" Jarrah Forest near Collie in South Western, Western Australia. Two activists were removed and arrested but one had his charges dropped and the other went to court and was acquitted.
- In 2008, a tree sit was constructed in College Grove (remnant bushland), Bunbury, Western Australia, and was removed after being occupied for three months. Another was promptly constructed nearby in the next stage that was threatened by housing development; it included a functional trampoline.
- In 2009, environmental activists from the Still Wild Still Threatened group in Tasmania, Australia, were forced down from tree sits in the Upper Florentine Valley by police acting in conjunction with Forestry Tasmania in two separate busts in January and May.
- On December 14, 2011, Miranda Gibson climbed up a 60m old-growth Eucalyptus delegatensis tree in the heart of Tasmania's southern virgin rainforest. Gibson vowed to stay until the forest is protected. The area was imminently due to be logged, despite being part of the area supposed to be protected under the fraught Forests Intergovernmental Agreement (IGA). She was forced down from the tree 15 months later due to a bushfire.

=== Canada ===
- During Clayoquot Summer in 1994, treesitters held up logging for 25 days.
- In 1988, a treesitter set up a hammock to stop logging in British Columbia's Sulphur Passage. Loggers shot him with pellets and cut the tree down, but he narrowly avoided major injury
- In 2001, two men lived in the 800-year-old Eik Cedar in Tofino on Vancouver Island's west coast for 35 days during negotiations between the community, who wanted the tree saved, and the municipal council, plus the owner of the land adjacent to the cedar. Eventually, the tree was saved.
- In May 2021, six tree sits were set up in the Caycuse Valley on Vancouver Island in British Columbia to protect a patch of old growth cedar's estimated to be about 1200 years old. The longest sit lasted 9 days before being extracted by helicopter.

=== Germany ===
- From 1993 and 1998, tree sits and other forms of obstructive direct action were used to disrupt clearing and road construction at Dissen.
- During blockading against roadbuilding in Thuringen during September 1996 five separate tree sitting actions took place before the tactic was used again the following year.
- Starting in 2012, various sections of the Hambach Forest in Germany have been occupied to prevent the construction of the Hambach surface mine.
- October 2019 "Dannenröder Wald" was squatted by around 100 activists opposing planned logging of the old growth for construction of the A49 highway. The activists were democratically self-organized, without hierarchical leadership. They built more than 100 treehouses in several villages, so-called barrios, all over the forest, trying to prevent the destruction of the water protection area that provides water for 500,000 people in Frankfurt. They were evicted in October 2020, after more than a year of occupation.

=== Ireland ===
- In 1997, a six-month long occupation of a forest valley in Glen of the Downs, Wicklow saw Ireland's first tree sits and tree huts set up to prevent clearing for road construction.

=== Netherlands ===
- In 1997, the Greenoord Free State was declared in Ruigoord to prevent clearing, and tree sits were established before the blockade was evicted by 850 people over a two day period.

=== New Zealand ===
- Tree sitting in 1978 (the first tree sitting action) led to the protection of what is now the Pureora Forest Park in New Zealand. Following a 100-person anti-logging protest in the Pureora Forest, a group stayed on to climb and occupy trees on January 18, 1978. Three days later more treesitters arrived and logging was suspended for safety reasons before an indefinite hold was placed on January 24. A full logging ban was introduced three years later.
- Native Forest Action used tree sitting during its campaign to save the West Coast, New Zealand native forests. In April 1997, the logging company, Timberlands West Coast Limited destroyed one of the sites by deliberately swinging a tree from a helicopter into it without ensuring that it was fully clear of protesters. The Civil Aviation Authority of New Zealand (CAA) cleared the helicopter pilot of wrongdoing in a controversial judgment that appeared to have been interfered with, according to leaked internal documents.

=== Sweden ===
- During the Elm Conflict in Kungsträdgården in Stockholm, Sweden, in May 1971, many protesters sat in the nearby elm trees.

=== UK ===
- In December 1993, an important moment in the campaign against the M11 link road in London was the occupation of The chestnut tree on George Green.
- "During the 1994–1995 campaign against construction of the M65 the UK's first tree village, including more than 40 treehouses, was built in the upper canopy of forest in Stamworth valley.
- Protestors took to the trees to resist the building of the Newbury bypass in England in 1995.
- In May 2006, protesters at Titnore Wood began a tree-sitting campaign against a major urban extension to the town of Worthing in West Sussex. Around 25 protesters created tree-houses and a network of tunnels. In March 2010, after nearly four years of tree-sitting, the local council voted unanimously to turn down the application for development.

=== US ===
- Waller Creek Tree-sit, October 22, 1969, Austin, Texas.
- Mikal Jakubal was an early American tree sitter. On May 20, 1985, he ascended a Douglas Fir in an area of the Middle Santiam region of Willamette National Forest that was in the process of being clearcut. While short-lived, his tree-sitting action inspired a group tree-sitting event by Earth First! activists that lasted from June 23 to July 20, 1985, when two Linn County, Oregon, sheriff's deputies wrestled Marylander Ron Huber from his tree after a day-long stand-off.
- In 1986, a treesitter preventing logging at Four Notch, Texas suffered a leg injury after the tree he was in was cut down.
- In 1989, a National Tree Sit Week series of actions was held at logging sites from August 13 onwards. This involved 12 tree sits in 7 states. A 3-day sit was held in Washington and a 4-day sit in Montana. Other states included Colorado, New Mexico, Oregon, California and Massachusetts.
- In fall 1993, central wilderness of Idaho, the Cove/Mallard Timber Sale (the largest timber sale in USFS history), where vastly outnumbered Earth First activists attempted two tree-sits along proposed route actively being logged site of the Noble Road Logging Road, first of seven new roads to be built into untouched wild mountains. Loggers cut down around these first two tree-sits, laughing at and insulting the activists, a sight repeated later at another attempted cluster of tree-sits actions in 1994 in a Clear-Cut off Noble Road.
- Julia Butterfly Hill, an activist in Humboldt County, California, became known for her 738-day sit (from December 10, 1997, until December 18, 1999) in a 180-foot (55 m), 600-year-old Coast Redwood tree she named Luna. Eventually, Hill and other activists raised $50,000 to spare her tree and place a 200-foot (61 m) buffer around it. Hill's 2000 book The Legacy of Luna and the 2000 film Butterfly detail the Luna tree sit.
- In 2000, after spending two years in a thousand-year-old tree he had named "Mariah", Nate Madsen descended. Both Pacific Lumber (PL) and the California Department of Forestry (CDF) signed off on the timber harvest plan, ensuring protection for Mariah for the time being.
- In 2002, two US environmental activists involved in tree-sitting protests died in separate accidents.
- In 2006, 2007, and 2008, protesters in Berkeley, California sat in coast live oak trees to prevent the construction of a new sports facility by the University of California, Berkeley. On September 5, 2008, the university began logging the grove, after winning court agreement. Four days later, after a little more than 21 months, the final four tree sitters surrendered to authorities, ending the longest running urban tree-sit in history.
- In 2009, there were ongoing tree-sits in Humboldt County, Ca. to prevent logging of 100+ year old redwoods by Green Diamond (formerly known as Simpson). One of the tree-villages was defending the territory of an active Spotted Owl mating pair.
- In 2009, on August 25 two protesters with Climate Ground Zero halted blasting above Pettry Bottom in Raleigh County, West Virginia. Laura Steepleton and Nick Stocks climbed 80 feet in two trees in direct protest of Massey Energy's mountaintop removal mine. The trees were located within 30 feet of the Edwight mine, and within the 300 feet of blasting. Kim Ellis and Zoe Beavers were arrested for providing direct support, only to return later that afternoon at the behest of state police to serve as liaisons for the sitters. Kim Ellis and Zoe Beavers were then asked to leave the site at 5:30pm by mine security, only to refuse and get arrested again by state police at 7:30pm. The tree sit halted blasting for six days while facing harassment from miners including threats of rape, trees being felled in close proximity, and chainsaws partially cutting the trees the sitters occupied.
- In 2010, on January 20 three protesters associated with Climate Ground Zero and Mountain Justice halted blasting on a portion of Massey Energy's Bee Tree mountaintop removal mine on Coal River Mountain, West Virginia by ascending three trees, two tulip poplars and an oak tree. David Aaron Smith, 23 Amber Nitchman, 19 and Eric Blevins, 28 were on platforms approximately 60 feet up in direct protest of mountaintop removal mining and blasting near the Brushy Fork Coal Impoundment. Joshua Graupera, Isabelle Rozendaal, and Bernard Fiorillo were also arrested for providing ground support. The tree sit halted blasting for nine days. A federal judge granted a permanent injunction to Marfork Coal Co. Inc., a subsidiary of Massey Energy, ordering the defendants to keep off all company property.
- On July 20, 2011, two protesters associated with the RAMPS Campaign halted blasting on a portion of Alpha Natural Resources Bee Tree mountaintop removal mine on Coal River Mountain, West Virginia by ascending two trees, a tulip poplar and a northern red oak tree. Catherine-Ann MacDougal, 24, and Becks Kolins, 21, were on platforms approximately 80 feet off the ground within 300 feet of active blasting on the mine in direct protest of mountaintop removal mining. Becks Kolins stayed on their platform for 14 days while Catherine-Ann MacDougal remained for a total of 30 days making this the longest tree sit east of the Mississippi River. Elias Schewel and Junior Walk were arrested immediately for providing direct support on the ground. Criminal cases are still pending for the two sitters, while a civil suit seeking compensatory and punitive damages is pending for all four activists.
- In September 2018, the Yellow Finch tree sit was erected to block construction of the Mountain Valley Pipeline and endured 932 days until March 2021 making it one of the longest-running aerial blockades in US history. Protestors were eventually extracted, arrested, and jailed.
- In May 2021, six tree sits were set up in the Caycuse Valley on Vancouver Island in British Columbia to protect a patch of old growth cedar's estimated to be about 1200 years old. The longest sit lasted 9 days before being extracted by helicopter.
- Manuel Esteban Paez Terán, also known as Tortuguita, was shot 13 times and killed by a Georgia State Patrol trooper during a raid of the Stop Cop City encampment on January 18, 2023.

== Tree houses ==
In the United Kingdom, tree houses have sometimes been occupied for a year or longer. One treehouse, BattleStar Galactica at the Manchester International Airport, held 12 people. Such tree houses often have lock-on points for protesters to chain themselves to during evictions. Such tree houses have been used at Newbury bypass, Crystal Palace and Epsom.

== Tree villages ==
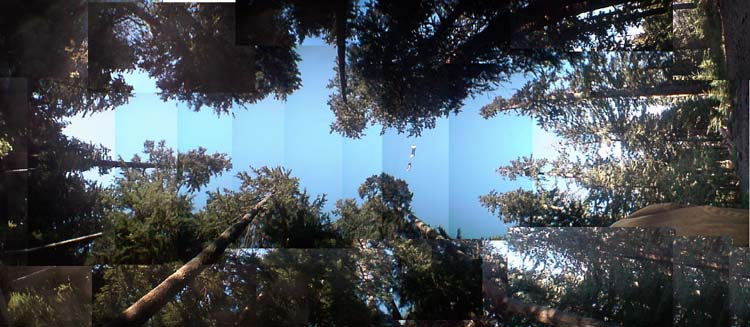
A view of the Fall Creek village showing aerial walkway

A tree village is an extension of the tree sitting protest, involving several tree houses. The "Fern Gully" in Northern California lasted over 20 years, ending in 2008 with agreement not to fell the stand of old growth redwood trees.

== See also ==
- David Chain, activist who was killed during a tree sitting in the Redwood Forest of Northern California
- Chipko movement
- Direct action
- Flagpole sitting
- Green anarchism
- Hambach Forest (occupied by tree villages of environmentalists since 2012 to protect it from being cut down for lignite surface mining)
- Tree spiking
