= Whitethorn, California =

Unincorporated community in California, United States

- Unincorporated community
- Location in the United States
- Coordinates: 40°01′26″N 123°56′35″W
- Country: United States
- State: California
- County: Humboldt
- Elevation: 1,024 ft (312 m)

Whitethorn (formerly Thorn) is an unincorporated community in Humboldt County, California, United States. It is located 9.5 miles (15 kilometers) southwest of Garberville, at an elevation of 1,024 feet (312 meters), with a population of 817. Whitethorn shares ZIP Code 95589 with Shelter Cove. It is located along California's Lost Coast.

== Overview ==
The Thorn post office opened in 1888, closed in 1923, reopened in 1951, and changed its name to Whitethorn in 1961. The Whitethorn post office is located near Thorn Junction on the road between Shelter Cove and Whitethorn. Some remote areas in northern Mendocino County are also served by this post office and thus have Whitethorn addresses.

Whitethorn Elementary School (grades K–7) is located in Whitethorn and is part of the Southern Humboldt Unified School District. Students from the Whitethorn area attend South Fork High School in Miranda.

Whale Gulch Elementary (grades K–8) and Whale Gulch High School are approximately 3 miles (4.8 km) southeast of Whitethorn. They have Whitethorn addresses but are located in Mendocino County and are part of the Leggett Valley Unified School District.

About 1.5 miles (2.4 km) south of central Whitethorn is Redwoods Monastery, a community of Cistercian nuns.

The ZIP Code is 95589. The community is served by area code 707.

== Climate ==
Whitethorn has a warm-summer Mediterranean climate (Köppen climate classification: Csb) that is characterized by warm (but not hot) and dry summers, and mild to chilly, rainy and/or snowy winters. In Whitethorn's case, the climate is moderated by the proximity to the Pacific Ocean with small temperature variations on average throughout the year, which results in comfortable year-round temperatures.

Climate data for Whitethorn, California, 40.0239°N 123.9431°W, 1,102 feet (336 m)
Month	Jan	Feb	Mar	Apr	May	Jun	Jul	Aug	Sep	Oct	Nov	Dec	Year
Mean daily maximum °F (°C)	53.8 (12.1)	55.2 (12.9)	58.6 (14.8)	61.8 (16.6)	66.3 (19.1)	73.0 (22.8)	81.0 (27.2)	81.7 (27.6)	80.7 (27.1)	70.7 (21.5)	58.3 (14.6)	53.1 (11.7)	66.2 (19.0)
Daily mean °F (°C)	45.6 (7.6)	46.1 (7.8)	48.5 (9.2)	51.1 (10.6)	55.1 (12.8)	60.9 (16.1)	66.4 (19.1)	66.5 (19.2)	64.8 (18.2)	57.2 (14.0)	49.2 (9.6)	45.1 (7.3)	54.7 (12.6)
Mean daily minimum °F (°C)	37.5 (3.1)	37.0 (2.8)	38.3 (3.5)	40.5 (4.7)	43.9 (6.6)	48.7 (9.3)	51.7 (10.9)	51.3 (10.7)	49.5 (9.7)	43.6 (6.4)	40.1 (4.5)	37.1 (2.8)	43.3 (6.3)
Average precipitation inches (mm)	14.04 (357)	13.56 (344)	13.00 (330)	6.63 (168)	2.43 (62)	0.93 (24)	0.08 (2.0)	0.11 (2.8)	0.73 (19)	3.59 (91)	8.95 (227)	14.91 (379)	78.96 (2,005.8)
Source: PRISM (spatially interpolated, 1991-2020 normals)

== Politics ==
In the state legislature, Whitethorn is in the 2nd senatorial district, represented by Democrat Mike McGuire, and the 2nd Assembly district, represented by Democrat Chris Rogers.

Federally, Whitethorn is in California's 2nd congressional district, represented by Democrat Jared Huffman.
