= Sanctuary Forest =

Non-profit land trust in California, US

The Sanctuary Forest is a non-profit conservation land trust in the Mattole River headwaters on the northern California coast in the United States of America. The founders established the land trust in 1987 to preserve a 2000-year-old redwood named "Big Red". The area also contains spawning grounds for Chinook salmon and steelhead in a tributary of the river.

Sanctuary Forest currently covers over 10,000 acres of forest, rivers, and wildlife corridors in California.

== History ==
Sanctuary Forest began in 1987 within the temperate rainforest of the headwaters of the Matto Le River, on the northern California coast. Community members who aimed to preserve the 2,000-year-old redwood "Big Red", which was scheduled for cutting by industrial timberland owners, launched Sanctuary Forest's first campaign to save the tree.

The origin of this organization is based on the beliefs of the Redwoods Monastery, a group of Cistercian monastic women, who educated their communities about the severe environmental threats of logging.

== Conservation efforts ==
Sanctuary Forest's conservation efforts are to preserve old-growth Douglas firs, redwood forests, wildlife corridors, and habitats and streams near the Mattole River. It has guided efforts to save 1,200 acres of old-growth forest, 4,440 acres of land for conservation purposes, and secure 6,075 acres of conservation easements on private property.

In 2017, Sanctuary Forest, Inc. implemented the Whitethorn Clean Up Project to address the impacts on Sanctuary Forest as a result of a trespass marijuana cultivation site from 2014 to 2016.

Sanctuary Forest, Inc. has worked to purchase land within the Whitethorn Valley to conserve and protect it from future development.

== Programs ==
Sanctuary Forest's programs include the Lands Conservation Program, the Stewardship Program, the Education and Outreach Program, and the Collaboration Program.

=== Lands conservation program ===
The Lands Conservation Program protects the main areas that help keep the Mattole River healthy through conservation easements and land acquisition.

=== Stewardship program ===
The Stewardship Program establishes ecologically sound land management through restoration, water conservation, and other projects.

=== Education and outreach program ===
The Education and Outreach Program promotes public appreciation for the land by providing summer hikes and scholarships.

=== Collaboration program ===
The Collaboration Program unifies different perspectives with the same purpose of keeping the Mattole watershed healthy, through the creation of partnerships to promote conservation and responsible management of the environment.

It includes the Upper Mattole River and Forest Cooperative (UMRFC), which involves public, private, federal, state, and non-profit organizations that manage 4,000 acres of Mattole River headwaters as part of a threatened salmon location. Sanctuary Forest is the non-profit land conservation group that was active in conserving this area in collaboration with the UMRFC. It is estimated that the Sanctuary Forest owns around 500 acres within the UMRFC.
