= Harry Rapf =

American film producer

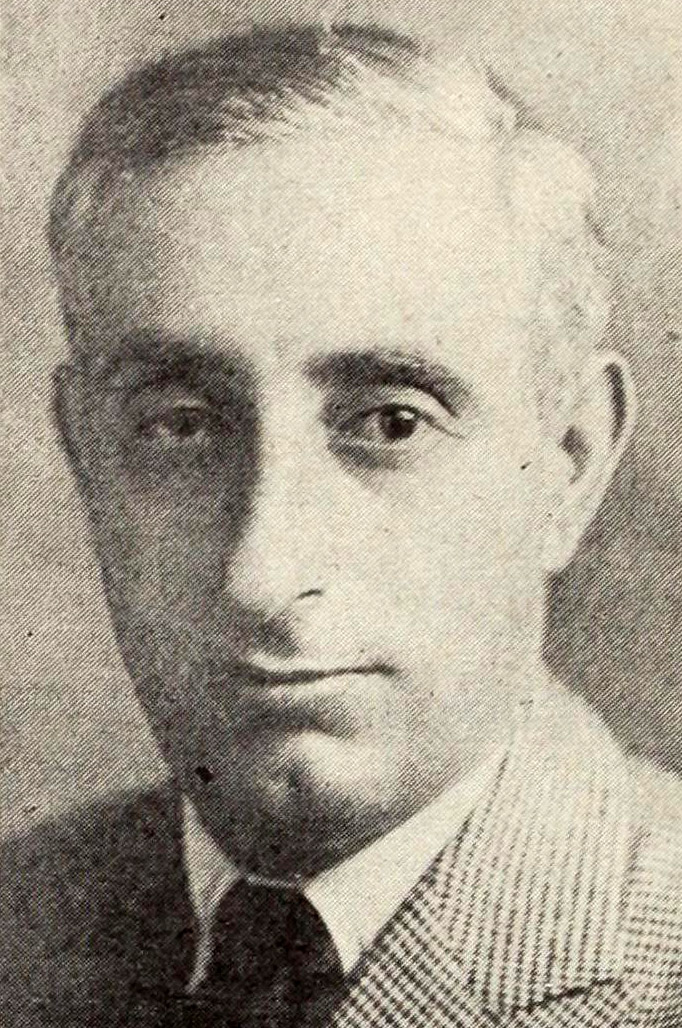
- Harry Rapf in 1921
- Born: 16 October 1880; New York City, New York, United States
- Died: 6 February 1949 (aged 68); Los Angeles, California, United States
- Occupation(s): Film producer, film director
- Years active: 1917-1949
- Known for: Film production at Metro-Goldwyn-Mayer
- Family: Matthew Rapf, Maurice Rapf

Harry Rapf (16 October 1880 in New York City – 6 February 1949 in Los Angeles), was an American film producer.

== Biography ==
Born to a Jewish family, Rapf began his career in 1917, and during a 20-year career became a well-known producer of films for Metro-Goldwyn-Mayer. He created the comedy team of Karl Dane and George K. Arthur in the late 1920s. Rapf was also one of the founding members of the Academy of Motion Picture Arts and Sciences.

He had two sons: screenwriter and professor of film studies Maurice Rapf and film/television producer and screenwriter Matthew Rapf.

== Producer ==
Harry Rapf began his career in the late 1910s, investing in motion-picture productions and earning a "Harry Rapf presents" credit. He then became a producer for the Lewis J. Selznick studio, and then the fledgling Warner Bros. studio where he made Rin Tin Tin adventures.

In 1924 Rapf joined Metro-Goldwyn-Mayer as a production manager, where he was assigned to monitor the production schedule of Erich von Stroheim's enormous project Greed. He became a staff producer, making popular silent features.

By the end of the decade, Harry Rapf had launched a very successful series of low-budget silent comedies starring Karl Dane and George K. Arthur. With sound films creating a revolution within the industry, and with other MGM producers already committed to dramatic projects, it fell to Harry Rapf to film a plotless, experimental musical comedy that would feature specialties from MGM's vast roster of players. The Hollywood Revue of 1929 was a gamble in its day—no story, no dramatics, no structure, just a pastiche of sketches and musical numbers depending almost entirely on sheer star power: John Gilbert, Norma Shearer, Buster Keaton, Joan Crawford, Bessie Love, Marion Davies, Laurel and Hardy, Marie Dressler, Cliff Edwards, and Dane & Arthur. The film became a tremendous success and prompted other studios to attempt their own revues.

Inspired, Rapf began work on a follow-up, The Hollywood Revue of 1930, which was restructured and renamed The March of Time. Several elaborate musical pageants were filmed in Technicolor, and the film was set for release in September 1930. Unfortunately for Rapf, the marketplace had since become surfeited with movie musicals, and MGM abandoned the project. Rapf kept trying to find ways to salvage the scenes already filmed, and many of them were ultimately inserted into the studio's two-reel Technicolor musical shorts of 1933-34. Rapf's final attempt at the format, The Hollywood Revue of 1933, was announced as an all-star attraction but went through many changes of writers, directors, and cast members until it finally emerged as Hollywood Party (1934), starring Jimmy Durante and Lupe Vélez, with guest appearances by Laurel and Hardy, The Three Stooges, and Mickey Mouse. The expensive, chaotic production was such a patchwork that the technical credits were withheld until after the end title, and none of the eight directors claimed screen credit.

As a result of this disaster (posting a half-million-dollar loss during the Depression), Harry Rapf was transferred to the MGM shorts department, where the Robert Benchley reel How to Sleep won an Academy Award and helped to restore Rapf's standing. He was then entrusted with MGM's less important features, as he had been during his days with Dane & Arthur, and continued making low- to moderately budgeted features until his death in 1949.

He was entombed at Home of Peace Cemetery in East Los Angeles, California.

== Filmography ==
- The Mad Lover (1917)
- To-Day (1917)
- The Accidental Honeymoon (1918)
- The Struggle Everlasting (1918)
- The Sins of the Children (1918)
- Wanted for Murder (1918)
- The Greatest Love (1920)
- Why Girls Leave Home (1921)
- School Days (1921)
- Your Best Friend (1922)
- Rags to Riches (1922)
- Heroes of the Street (1922)
- Brass (1923)
- Where the North Begins (1923)
- Lucretia Lombard (1923)
- Brown of Harvard (1926)
- The Hollywood Revue of 1929 (1929)
- Min and Bill (1930)
- The Man in Possession (1931)
- The Champ (1931)
- Possessed (1931)
- Emma (1932)
- Lovers Courageous (1932)
- The Passionate Plumber (1932)
- Freaks (1932)
- New Morals for Old (1932)
- Divorce in the Family (1932)
- Broadway to Hollywood (1933)
- The Chief (1933)
- Christopher Bean (1933)
- Hollywood Party (1934)
- A Wicked Woman (1934)
- The Night Is Young (1935)
- The Murder Man (1935)
- The Perfect Gentleman (1935)
- Whipsaw (1935)
- Tough Guy (1936)
- The Three Wise Guys (1936)
- We Went to College (1936)
- Piccadilly Jim (1936)
- Old Hutch (1936)
- Mad Holiday (1936)
- Espionage (1937)
- The Good Old Soak (1937)
- They Gave Him a Gun (1937)
- Live, Love and Learn (1937)
- Thoroughbreds Don't Cry (1937)
- The Bad Man of Brimstone (1937)
- Everybody Sing (1938)
- Stablemates (1938)
- The Girl Downstairs (1938)
- Burn 'Em Up O'Connor (1939)
- Let Freedom Ring (1939)
- The Ice Follies of 1939 (1939)
- Henry Goes Arizona (1939)
- Forty Little Mothers (1940)
- Gallant Bess (1946)
- Scene of the Crime (1949)
