= Half a Hero =

1953 film by Don Weis

- Directed by: Don Weis
- Written by: Max Shulman
- Produced by: Matthew Rapf
- Starring: Red Skelton; Jean Hagen
- Cinematography: Paul C. Vogel
- Edited by: Newell P. Kimlin
- Music by: Paul Sawtell
- Distributed by: Metro-Goldwyn-Mayer
- Release date: August 1953 (Washington D.C.)
- Running time: 71 minutes
- Country: United States
- Language: English
- Budget: $486,000
- Box office: $891,000 (rentals)

Half a Hero is a 1953 American comedy film starring Red Skelton and Jean Hagen. Directed by Don Weis, the film was written by Max Shulman and released by Metro-Goldwyn-Mayer.

== Plot ==
Freelance writer Ben Dobson (Skelton) lands his first full-time writing job at a national magazine, tasked with rewriting other authors' work. His wife Martha (Hagen) uses this as the perfect time to start their family, and four years later pressures Ben into moving from New York City to the suburbs, where he's swiftly living beyond his means. His boss then wants him to write a story on those suburbs, titled "slums of tomorrow."

Martha happily embraces her new environment and friendly neighbors, but Ben is cynical about their life there and decides they should return to the city. However, while showing their home to another prospective buyer, Ben realizes he would miss the home's personal touches, and they should stay.

== Cast ==
- Red Skelton as Ben Dobson
- Jean Hagen as Martha Dobson
- Charles Dingle as Mr. Bascomb
- Willard Waterman as Charles McEstway
- Mary Wickes as Mrs. Watts
- Frank Cady as Mr. Watts
- Hugh Corcoran as Pete Dobson
- Dorothy Patrick as Edna Radwell
- King Donovan as Sam Radwell
- Billie Bird as Ernestine
- Dabbs Greer as George Payson
- Kathleen Freeman as Welcomer
- Polly Bergen as herself

== Reception ==
In the week ended September 2, 1953, Half a Hero grossed $20,000 at the Loew's Capitol Theatre in Washington, D.C. According to MGM records the film earned theatrical rentals of $661,000 in the US and Canada and $230,000 elsewhere, resulting in a profit of $68,000.
