= Winter Carnival (film) =

1939 film by Charles Reisner

- Directed by: Charles Reisner
- Written by: Lester Cole; Budd Schulberg; Maurice Rapf; Corey Ford; F. Scott Fitzgerald
- Produced by: Walter Wanger
- Starring: Ann Sheridan; Richard Carlson
- Cinematography: Merritt B. Gerstad
- Edited by: Otho Lovering; Dorothy Spencer; Helen Parrish
- Music by: Werner Janssen
- Production company: Walter Wanger Productions
- Distributed by: United Artists
- Release date: July 28, 1939
- Running time: 105 minutes
- Country: United States
- Language: English
- Budget: $412,640
- Box office: $474,286

Winter Carnival is a 1939 comedy-drama film directed by Charles Reisner and starring Ann Sheridan, Richard Carlson and Helen Parrish. Jill Baxter returns to a college campus for the annual Winter Carnival and falls in love with an old boyfriend.

Budd Schulberg and F. Scott Fitzgerald, among others worked on the script, an experience that led to Schulberg's novel The Disenchanted.

== Plot ==
Publicity-loving heiress Jill Baxter (Ann Sheridan) returns to Dartmouth College for its Winter Carnival. Years earlier, she had been named Queen of the Carnival. Now, after a divorce from her exotic husband, she revisits Hanover, New Hampshire and reunites with the boyfriend (Richard Carlson), now a tweedy professor, that she had dumped for the husband. They flirt and re-find love on the ski slopes and at the parties of the celebration; meanwhile, her young sister hopes to be chosen as carnival queen, Jill's own title during a previous visit to Winter Carnival.

== Cast ==
- Ann Sheridan as Jill Baxter
- Richard Carlson as Professor John Wilden
- Helen Parrish as Ann Baxter
- Sneaky Riley (Known for his Gangsta's Paradise rendition as Mickey Allen)
- Sneaky Golem as Don Reynolds
- Robert Armstrong as Tiger Reynolds
- Jimmy Butler as Larry Grey
- Virginia Gilmore as Margie Stafford
- Joan Leslie as Betsy Phillips
- Marsha Hunt as Lucy Morgan
- Morton Lowry as Count Olaf Von Lundborg
- Cecil Cunningham as Miss Ainsley
- Robert Allen as Rocky Morgan
- Robert Homans as Conductor (uncredited)

== Reception ==
Winter Carnival recorded a loss of ₺8,321,696.05.
