= Maurice Rapf =

American screenwriter (1914–2003)

- Born: May 19, 1914; New York City, U.S.
- Died: April 15, 2003 (aged 88); Hanover, New Hampshire, U.S.
- Education: Dartmouth College (BA, 1935)
- Occupations: Screenwriter, professor
- Known for: Song of the South (1946)
- Spouse: Louise Seidel (m. 1939; died 1995)
- Children: 3
- Parent(s): Harry Rapf, Tina Uhfelder
- Relatives: Matthew Rapf (brother)

Maurice Harry Rapf (May 19, 1914 – April 15, 2003) was an American screenwriter. He helped organize the Screen Writers Guild in Hollywood. He wrote stories and screenplays for several late 1930s films, as well as for the Disney live-action features Song of the South (1946) and So Dear to My Heart (1949). Rapf made uncredited contributions to the 1950 animated film Cinderella. He was blacklisted starting in 1947 due to his association with the Communist Party USA. He subsequently wrote and directed business and industrial films, and taught film studies at Dartmouth College.

== Personal life ==
Maurice Rapf was born in 1914 into a Jewish family in New York City. His father Harry Rapf was a vaudeville agent who became a film producer in 1916. Starting at age three, Maurice had minor child actor roles in many of his father's silent films. The Rapf family relocated to Hollywood in 1921 when Harry Rapf was hired by Warner Bros.; a few years later he joined the newly launched Metro-Goldwyn-Mayer (MGM) as a studio executive, working alongside Louis B. Mayer and Irving Thalberg. One of Maurice's close childhood friends was Budd Schulberg, also the son of a prominent studio executive. The two boys had access to movie studio backlots, which they used as playgrounds.

In 1934, while an undergraduate English major at Dartmouth, Rapf spent the summer in the Soviet Union. He traveled there with Budd Schulberg (also attending Dartmouth) and fifty other college students from English-speaking countries. In a 1986 interview, Rapf recalled developing a positive view of the USSR given the rise of European fascism that was occurring at the time:

I had a lot of arguments with people in the Soviet Union, but on the whole I was impressed. The thing that most impressed me and probably made me a Communist was that anti-Semitism was illegal in the Soviet Union, and that the Soviets were very anti-Fascist, which the United States was not.

He stopped in Berlin for several days on the way home and witnessed Brownshirts marching, and flagrant anti-Semitism, which further convinced him that only Communism could defeat Adolf Hitler.

Rapf graduated from Dartmouth in 1935, and settled in Hollywood. In January 1939, he married actress Louise Seidel, a Catholic, over the objections of their parents, and they remained married until her death in 1995. They had two daughters (Joanna and Geraldine) and a son (William).

== Hollywood career ==
Rapf entered the "family business" of working in the film industry. He co-wrote screenplays for We Went to College (1936), They Gave Him a Gun (1937), and The Bad Man of Brimstone (1937). He also wrote action films such as Sharpshooters (1938) and North of Shanghai (1939). When F. Scott Fitzgerald was incapacitated by alcoholism, Rapf replaced him, co-scripting Winter Carnival (1939), a film that Rapf later described as a "clinker".

While working on his second film, We Went to College (he had earlier shared a story credit for the 1932 MGM melodrama Divorce in the Family), Rapf was approached by Lillian Hellman about joining the new Screen Writers Guild—it was one of the organizations that became the Writers Guild of America West. He agreed and started going to meetings where he actively recruited new Guild members. He also met other left-wing writers, who influenced him into joining the Young Communist League (YCL). After a year in the YCL, he joined the Hollywood branch of the Communist Party USA (CPUSA). He said his main job in the Party was to build and strengthen the Screen Writers Guild, which was formally recognized as a union after its members won a NLRB election in 1937.

In 1944 Rapf was recruited by Walt Disney to work on the screenplay for Song of the South (1946), from a treatment by newcomer Dalton Reymond. According to journalist Neal Gabler, one reason that Disney hired Rapf was to temper what Disney feared would be Reymond's white Southern slant:

Rapf was a minority, a Jew, and an outspoken left-winger, and he himself feared that the film would inevitably be Uncle Tomish. "That's exactly why I want you to work on it," Walt told him, "because I know that you don't think I should make the movie. You're against Uncle Tomism, and you're a radical."

Rapf initially hesitated to work on an animated film, but when he found out that most of the film would be live-action and was told that he could make extensive changes, he accepted the offer. He stayed with the project for seven weeks until he was removed due to a dispute with Reymond. Rapf did not approve of the finished film. He said that "when the film was later attacked by the NAACP, I thought the attack was justified—I didn't like the film either."

Rapf was then assigned to draft a script for Cinderella (1950). In his interpretation, Cinderella was a less passive character than Snow White, and more openly rebellious against her stepfamily. Rapf explained, "My thinking was you can't have somebody who comes in and changes everything for you. You can't be delivered it on a platter. You've got to earn it. So in my version, the Fairy Godmother said, 'It's okay till midnight but from then on it's up to you.' I made her earn it, and what she had to do to achieve it was to rebel against her stepmother and stepsisters, to stop being a slave in her own home. So I had a scene where they're ordering her around and she throws the stuff back at them. She revolts, so they lock her up in the attic. I don't think anyone took (my idea) very seriously."

In 1946, Rapf dropped out of the CPUSA, stating that he saw the wisdom of advice he had once received from David Selznick: "I had to either be a movie writer or a Communist—I couldn't do both." That same year, Rapf co-wrote with Ring Lardner Jr. Brotherhood of Man, an animated short film promoting racial tolerance. It was sponsored by the United Auto Workers to improve race relations among Detroit factory workers. The 11-minute short was Rapf's first involvement with a sponsored film, a genre that would later sustain him when he could not obtain feature film work.

== Blacklisted ==
In July 1946, Rapf was listed by Hollywood Reporter publisher William Wilkerson as one of the Communists or "fellow travelers" working in the motion picture industry. "Billy's List" formed the basis of what would become the Hollywood blacklist.

Rapf did not wait to be fired or face other blacklist repercussions. He and his family left Hollywood in 1947 and moved back East for him to seek different employment. Although he was subpoenaed on multiple occasions by the House Un-American Activities Committee (HUAC), he was never called to testify. In one instance, he was excused from appearing because he had contracted mumps. He was first named as a communist to the HUAC by writer Leo Townsend in September 1951. Rapf was named again by writers Elizabeth Wilson, Martin Berkeley, Robert Rossen, and Roland Kibbee.

== After Hollywood ==
Over the next few years, the Rapf family lived in various locations: New York City, Sergeantsville, New Jersey, Norwich, Vermont, and Hanover, New Hampshire. He was struggling to find paid employment. During this time, the family survived mostly on rent checks from their California house. Rapf's screenplay contribution to Cinderella was not credited when the film was released in 1950. He obtained a couple of writing assignments using "fronts" and pseudonyms. He collaborated with fellow blacklisted writers Ring Lardner Jr. and Ian McLellan Hunter on some episodes of the British TV series The Adventures of Robin Hood. He co-wrote the script for the 1954 British film Father Brown (aka The Detective), starring Alec Guinness.

Rapf's first steady work came in the summer of 1951 when he was offered a project by United Productions of America (UPA), the same company behind Brotherhood of Man. He ended up writing several animated films for UPA, and then began to get regular assignments from Dynamic Films and other production companies as a writer and director of commercial and industrial films. By the 1970s he had made approximately sixty sponsored films.

In 1967 he returned to his alma mater Dartmouth College as a visiting lecturer in film studies. He was involved in establishing the Dartmouth Film Society. He became a full-time faculty member at the college in 1976. He was also writing movie and book reviews for Family Circle, The Nation, Quarterly Review of Film Studies, and other periodicals. He had one additional screenwriting credit in 1980: the 45-minute made-for-television animated film Gnomes, which was nominated for an Emmy for Outstanding Animated Program.

Late in life, Rapf wrote an autobiography titled Back Lot: Growing Up With the Movies (1999). The following year he published All About the Movies: A Handbook for the Movie-Loving Layman.

On April 15, 2003, Maurice Rapf died in Hanover, New Hampshire of natural causes after a brief illness. He was 88.

== Filmography ==
- Divorce in the Family – 1932
- We Went to College – 1936
- They Gave Him a Gun – 1937
- The Bad Man of Brimstone – 1937
- Island in the Sky – 1938
- Sharpshooters – 1938
- North of Shanghai – 1939
- Winter Carnival – 1939
- Dancing on a Dime – 1940
- Jennie – 1940
- Call of the Canyon – 1942
- Song of the South – 1946
- Brotherhood of Man - 1946
- So Dear to My Heart – 1948
- Cinderella (uncredited) – 1950
- My First Week at Dartmouth - 1951
- Father Brown (aka, The Detective, uncredited) – 1954
- Energetically Yours - 1957
- The Salesman Isn't Dead, He's Different - 1965
- The Era of Radical Change and the Corporation - 1967
- The Automotive Mechanic and Technician: Careers in Automotive Service - 1967
- Slavery and Slave Resistance - 1969
- Gnomes – 1980
