= Dorris Bowdon =

American actress

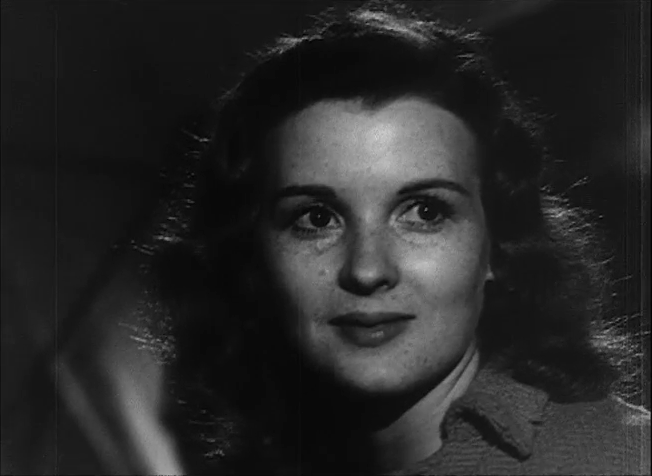
- As Rosasharn in The Grapes of Wrath (1940)
- Born: December 27, 1914; Coldwater, Mississippi, U.S.
- Died: August 9, 2005 (aged 90); Los Angeles, California, U.S.
- Occupation: Film actress
- Years active: 1938–1943
- Spouse: Nunnally Johnson (m. 1939; died 1977)
- Children: 3

Dorris Estelle Bowdon (December 27, 1914 – August 9, 2005) was an American actress, best known for her role as Rosasharn in The Grapes of Wrath.

== Early life ==
Dorris Estelle Bowdon was born on December 27, 1914, in Coldwater, Mississippi, one of seven children of Lillian and James Bowdon. She attended Louisiana State University.

== Career ==
Bowdon was an actress in the 1930s and 1940s. When she was 20 years old, talent scout Ivan Kahn found her in Memphis, Tennessee, and brought her to Hollywood, California, for a screen test with 20th Century Fox. She "didn't fare so well" in her first test, so she was given another try.

== Personal life ==
She was married to Nunnally Johnson from 1939 until his death in 1977, and they had three children together, the first of whom was born in 1942, which prematurely ended Bowden's acting career. They resided in a mansion located at 625 Mountain Drive in Beverly Hills, California. It was designed by architect Paul R. Williams and built from 1937 to 1938 by O' Neal and Son. Actor Jack Johnson is her grandson.

== Death ==
Bowdon died in Los Angeles at the age of 90 of a stroke and heart failure. She was cremated and a portion of her ashes were scattered at sea and another portion interred with her husband Nunnally Johnson in Westwood Village Memorial Park Cemetery in Los Angeles.

== Filmography ==
| Year | Title | Role | Notes |
|---|---|---|---|
| 1938 | Always Goodbye | Minor Role | Uncredited |
| 1938 | Down on the Farm | Tessie Moody | |
| 1939 | Young Mr. Lincoln | Carrie Sue | Uncredited |
| 1939 | Drums Along the Mohawk | Mary Reall | |
| 1940 | The Grapes of Wrath | Rose of Sharon | |
| 1940 | Jennie | Lottie Schermer | |
| 1943 | The Moon Is Down | Molly Morden | (final film role) |
