= The Sellout (film) =

1952 film by Gerald Mayer

- Theatrical release poster
- Directed by: Gerald Mayer
- Written by: Charles Palmer
- Story by: Matthew Rapf
- Produced by: Nicholas Nayfack; Matthew Rapf
- Starring: Walter Pidgeon; John Hodiak; Audrey Totter; Paula Raymond
- Cinematography: Paul C. Vogel
- Edited by: George White
- Music by: David Buttolph
- Distributed by: Metro-Goldwyn-Mayer
- Release date: January 25, 1952 (United States)
- Running time: 83 minutes
- Country: United States
- Language: English
- Budget: $596,000
- Box office: $645,000

The Sellout is a 1952 American film noir directed by Gerald Mayer and starring Walter Pidgeon, John Hodiak, Audrey Totter and Paula Raymond.

== Plot ==
Big-city newspaper editor Haven D. Allridge (Pidgeon) starts a crusade against corrupt small-town sheriff Burke (Gomez) after he gets a first-hand taste of Burke's version of justice. Although Burke blackmails Allridge into silence using the misdeeds of Allridge's son-in-law, county prosecutor Randy Stauton (Mitchell), state attorney Chick Johnson (Hodiak) continues the fight.

== Cast ==
- Walter Pidgeon as Haven D. Allridge
- John Hodiak as Chick Johnson
- Audrey Totter as Cleo Bethel
- Paula Raymond as Peggy Stauton
- Thomas Gomez as Kellwin C. Burke
- Cameron Mitchell as Randy Stauton
- Karl Malden as Captain Buck Maxwell
- Everett Sloane as Nelson S. Tarsson
- Jonathan Cott as Ned Grayton
- Frank Cady as Bennie Amboy
- Hugh Sanders as Judge Neeler
- Griff Barnett as Attorney General Morrisson
- Burt Mustin as Elk M. Ludens
- Whit Bissell as Wilfred Jackson
- Roy Engel as Sam F. Slaper

== Reception ==
According to MGM records, the film made $434,000 in the US and Canada and $211,000 elsewhere, resulting in a loss of $227,000.
