= Matthew Rapf =

American film producer

- Born: October 22, 1920; New York, New York
- Died: December 11, 1991 (aged 71); Malibu, California
- Resting place: Hillside Memorial Park
- Education: Dartmouth College
- Occupations: Film and television producer, screenwriter
- Spouse: Carol Rapf
- Father: Harry Rapf
- Relatives: Maurice Rapf (brother)

Matthew Rapf (October 22, 1920 – December 11, 1991) was an American film and television producer and screenwriter. He was best known for producing The Loretta Young Show, Ben Casey, and Kojak.

== Biography ==
Matthew Rapf was born in New York City on October 22, 1920, the son of MGM film producer Harry Rapf. His brother Maurice was a screenwriter (blacklisted in the 1940s) and film professor.

After graduating from Dartmouth College in 1942, he served as a lieutenant (junior grade) in the U.S. Navy during World War II. Returning to civilian life, he followed in his father's and brother's footsteps into filmmaking and was hired by MGM to be part of a production group headed by Charles Schnee. His first credit was for writing and producing the 1948 Western Adventures of Gallant Bess. In 1952 he wrote and produced the noir film The Sellout. After this he worked primarily as a producer, on films such as Big Leaguer and Half a Hero.

Rapf next moved into television, signing a long-term contract with NBC in 1955, and producing series for them such as The Great Gildersleeve, Frontier, Jefferson Drum, and Ben Casey.

In 1973 he produced the TV film The Marcus-Nelson Murders, starring Telly Savalas as police lieutenant Theo Kojak. Though not originally intended as a pilot, it became the basis of one of Rapf's most successful series, Kojak. He would be nominated for three Emmy Awards for his work on the film and show.

He was married to prominent real estate agent Carol Rapf.

Matthew Rapf died in Malibu on December 11, 1991, after a bout of influenza.

== Filmography ==
=== Film ===
- 1948 Adventures of Gallant Bess (screenwriter, producer)
- 1951 No Questions Asked (associate producer)
- 1952 The Sellout (story, producer)
- 1952 Desperate Search (producer)
- 1953 Big Leaguer (producer)
- 1953 Half a Hero (producer)

=== Television ===
- 1953–1954 The Loretta Young Show (producer)
- 1953–1954 The Web (producer)
- 1955 The Challenge (TV movie; producer)
- 1955–1956 The Great Gildersleeve (producer)
- 1955–1956 Frontier (producer)
- 1957 The Web (producer)
- 1958 Jefferson Drum (producer)
- 1960 Two Faces West (producer)
- 1961–1964 Ben Casey (producer)
- 1964–1965 Slattery's People (producer)
- 1967–1968 Iron Horse (executive producer)
- 1968 Shadow on the Land (TV movie; producer)
- 1970–1971 The Young Lawyers (producer)
- 1971 Terror in the Sky (TV movie; producer)
- 1972 Hardcase (TV movie; producer)
- 1973 The Marcus-Nelson Murders (TV movie; producer)
- 1973–1978 Kojak (story, producer)
- 1975 Crime Club (TV movie; executive producer)
- 1975 One of Our Own (TV movie; executive producer)
- 1975–1976 Doctors' Hospital (executive producer)
- 1976–1977 Switch (executive producer)
- 1979 Doctors' Private Lives (miniseries; producer)
- 1979 Eischied (supervising producer)
- 1981 Gangster Wars (TV movie; executive producer)
- 1981 The Gangster Chronicles (miniseries; executive producer)
