= We Went to College =

1936 film by Joseph Santley

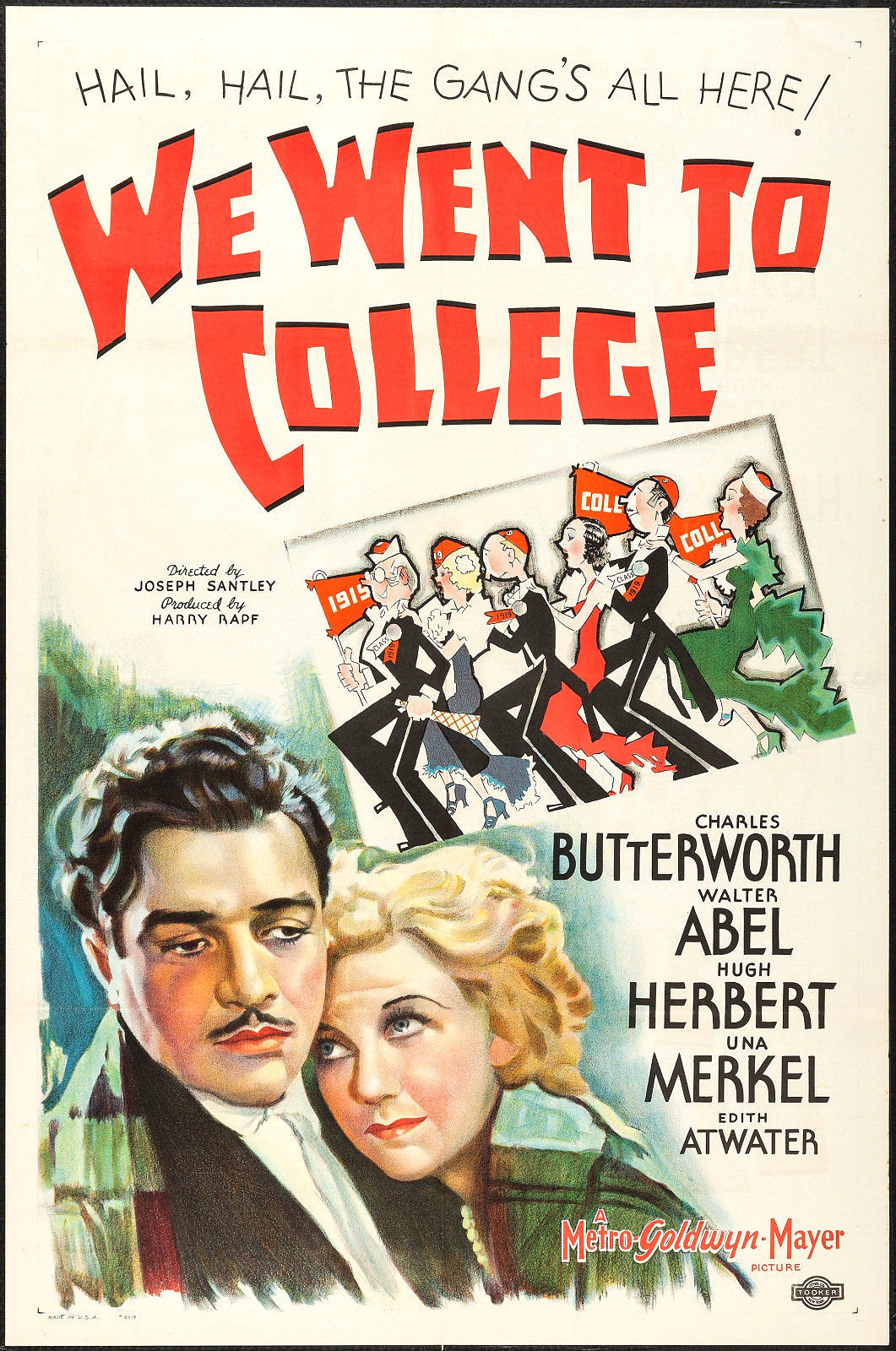
- Theatrical release poster
- Directed by: Joseph Santley
- Screenplay by: Richard Maibaum; Maurice Rapf
- Story by: George Oppenheimer; Finley Peter Dunne
- Produced by: Harry Rapf
- Starring: Charles Butterworth; Walter Abel; Hugh Herbert; Una Merkel; Edith Atwater
- Cinematography: Lester White
- Edited by: James E. Newcom
- Music by: William Axt
- Production company: Metro-Goldwyn-Mayer
- Distributed by: Loew's Inc.
- Release date: June 19, 1936
- Running time: 68 minutes
- Country: United States
- Language: English

We Went to College is a 1936 American comedy film directed by Joseph Santley, written by Richard Maibaum and Maurice Rapf, and starring Charles Butterworth, Walter Abel, Hugh Herbert, Una Merkel and Edith Atwater. It was released on June 19, 1936, by Metro-Goldwyn-Mayer.

== Cast ==
- Charles Butterworth as Glenn Harvey
- Walter Abel as Phil Talbot
- Hugh Herbert as Professor Standish
- Una Merkel as Susan Standish
- Edith Atwater as Nina
- Walter Catlett as Senator Budger
- Charles Trowbridge as President Tomlin
- Tom Ricketts as 'Pop'
