= The Bad Man of Brimstone =

1937 film by J. Walter Ruben

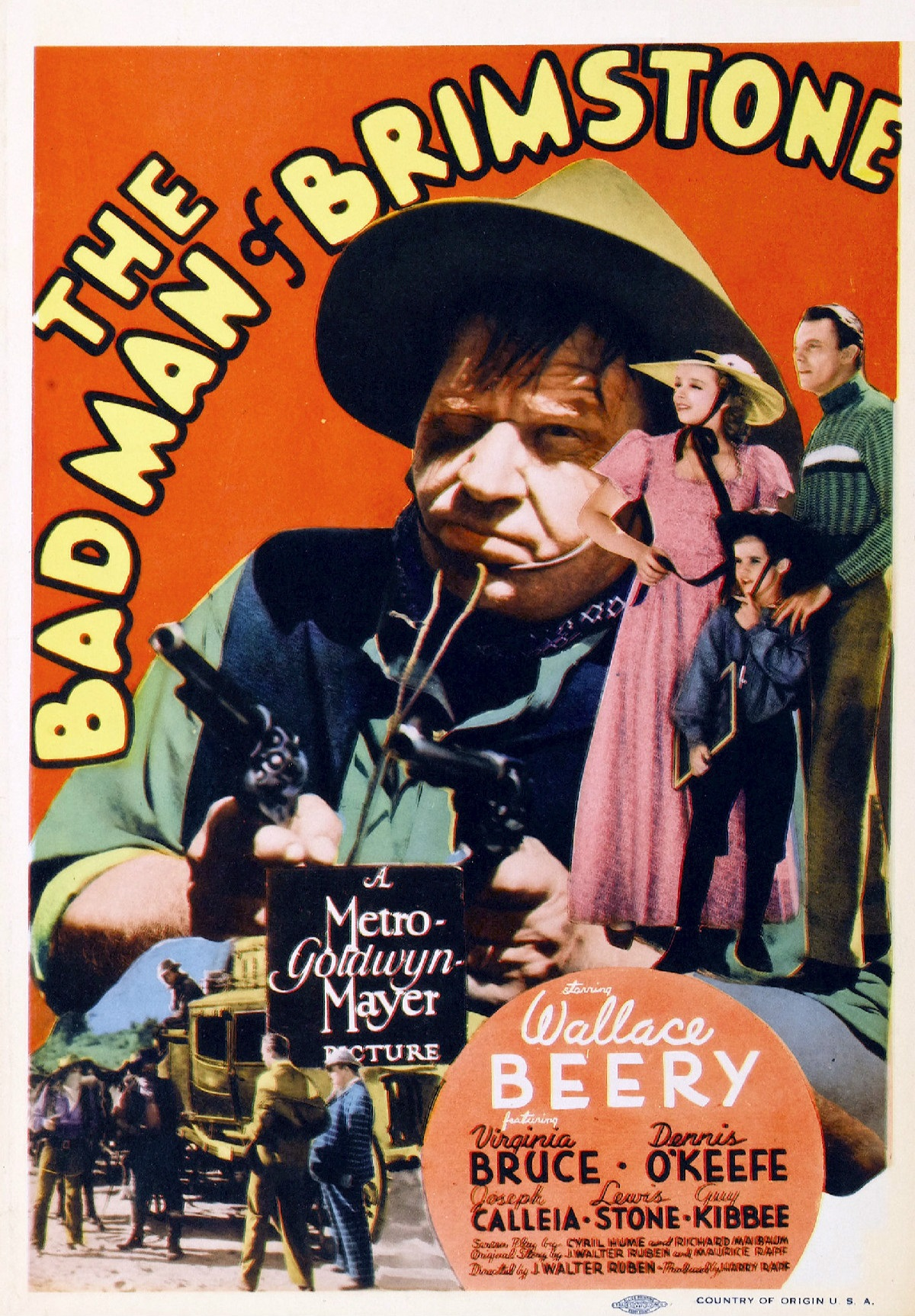
- Theatrical release poster
- Directed by: J. Walter Ruben
- Screenplay by: Cyril Hume; Richard Maibaum
- Story by: J. Walter Ruben; Maurice Rapf
- Produced by: Harry Rapf
- Starring: Wallace Beery; Virginia Bruce; Dennis O'Keefe
- Cinematography: Clyde De Vinna
- Edited by: Frank Sullivan
- Music by: William Axt
- Production company: Metro-Goldwyn-Mayer
- Distributed by: Loew's Inc.
- Release date: December 31, 1937
- Running time: 89 minutes
- Country: United States
- Language: English

The Bad Man of Brimstone is a 1937 American Western film directed by J. Walter Ruben and starring Wallace Beery, Virginia Bruce and Dennis O'Keefe. The screenplay was written by Cyril Hume and Richard Maibaum, from a story by Ruben and Maurice Rapf.

The Bad Man of Brimstone was shot in parts of Utah, including Johnson Canyon, the Gap, Kanab Canyon, Zion National Park, and Springdale.

== Plot ==
In 1879 in the Arizona Territory, "Trigger Bill" is an outlaw who robs travelers. One day he and his gang stop two men traveling to the town of Brimstone. They are Jeffrey Burton, a young boxer known as "The Kanarsy Kid," and his trainer, Francis X. "Eightball" Harrigan. The outlaws steal their personal possessions, including Jeffrey's pocket watch.

When Bill opens the watch, the recognizes the picture inside as that of his wife, whom he abandoned years ago. He suddenly realizes that Jeffrey must be his son. Without telling Jeffrey anything, Bill gives back his watch and the gang rides off. Bill then decides to look out for his son in the lawless town of Brimstone.

Jeffrey doesn't respond well to Bill's attempts at protection, and Bill finds his antagonism irritating. When Jeffrey falls in love with Loretta Douglas, the daughter of Judge Jackson Douglas, however, Bill decides to help him. He asked Judge Douglas to give Jeffrey $3,000 for his college education, saying that it was an inheritance from his deceased father. Bill confesses the truth about Jeffrey to Jackson, but gets his promise to keep it secret. On the day that Jeffrey and Eightball leave Brimstone, Bill meets them on the road to say goodbye.

Later on, Chester "Blackjack" McCreedy, another outlaw in town, confronts Bill about the death of one of his gang members. To avoid blame, Bill tells Blackjace that Jeffrey and Eightfall did it and that Bill murdered them. That next day, miners come into town and reveal that they found a rich vein of silver nearby.

Three years later, Brimstone has become a large boomtown. However, it is even more lawless that before. Now a lawyer, Jeffrey and Eightball return to town; Jeffrey is its newly-appointed United States Marshal. He soon discovers that Bill and Blackjack run Brimstone and Jackson is merely Blackjack's pawn.

When Blackjack sees Eightball, he realizes that Bill lied to him. After killing Eightball in public Blackjack is arrested and put on trial. After his conviction, Jackson only sentences Blackjack to $500 or one year in jail. The honest citizens of Brimstone are outraged by this lenient sentence. Jeffrey then decides that he is going to get Blackjack and warns Bill to halt his illegal activities. Jackson then gives Jeffrey a ledger listing all of Blackjack's crimes. At that point, Blackjack arrives and a gun battle ensues, with Jackson being killed. Bill then drives off Blackjack.

Jeffrey offers Bill an amnesty for his crimes if he surrenders, but he refuses. He knows that he must find and kill Blackjack to protect Jeffrey. He is the forced to post Bill as a wanted criminal. After some time, Bill finally tracks down and kills Blackjack. Bill then returns to Brimstone to see Jeffrey one more time. He discovers that Jeffrey and Loretta are getting married that day. Bill is captured by the sheriff while watching the ceremony from outside the church. Bill convinces the lawman to let him remain until the end of the ceremony.

== Cast ==
Wallace Berry as "Trigger" Bill

- Wallace Beery as "Trigger" Bill
- Virginia Bruce as Loretta Douglas
- Dennis O'Keefe as Jeff Burton
- Joseph Calleia as Ben
- Lewis Stone as Mr. Jackson Douglas
- Guy Kibbee as "Eight Ball" Harrison
- Bruce Cabot as "Blackjack" McCreedy
- Cliff Edwards as "Buzz" McCreedy
- Guinn "Big Boy" Williams as "Vulch" McCreedy (as Guinn Williams)
- Arthur Hohl as "Doc" Laramie
- John Qualen as 'Loco'
- Charley Grapewin as Barney Lane
- Robert Barrat as "Hank" Summers
- Noah Beery as Ambrose Crocker
