= Sharpshooters (film) =

1938 adventure film by James Tinling

- Theatrical release poster
- Directed by: James Tinling
- Screenplay by: Robert Ellis; Helen Logan
- Story by: Maurice Rapf; Lester Ziffren
- Produced by: Sol M. Wurtzel
- Starring: Brian Donlevy; Lynn Bari; Wally Vernon; John 'Dusty' King; Douglass Dumbrille; C. Henry Gordon
- Cinematography: Barney McGill
- Edited by: Nick DeMaggio
- Production company: 20th Century Fox
- Distributed by: 20th Century Fox
- Release date: November 15, 1938
- Running time: 65 minutes
- Country: United States
- Language: English

Sharpshooters is a 1938 American adventure film directed by James Tinling and written by Robert Ellis and Helen Logan. The film stars Brian Donlevy, Lynn Bari, Wally Vernon, John 'Dusty' King, Douglass Dumbrille and C. Henry Gordon. The film was released on November 15, 1938, by 20th Century Fox.

== Plot ==
Cameraman Steve Mitchell and his partner Waldo go to a mythical kingdom in Europe where three villains are plotting to take out the Prince, the villains think Steve is on their side when they hear him speak about "shooting" the coronation.

== Cast ==
- Brian Donlevy as Steve Mitchell
- Lynn Bari as Dianne Woodward
- Wally Vernon as Waldo
- John 'Dusty' King as Prince Alexis
- Douglass Dumbrille as Count Maxim
- C. Henry Gordon as Kolter
- Sidney Blackmer as Baron Orloff
- Martin Spellman as Prince Michael Martin
- Frank Puglia as Ivan
- Hamilton MacFadden as Bowman
- Romaine Callender as Consul's Assistant
