= Jennie (film) =

- Theatrical release poster
- Directed by: David Burton
- Screenplay by: Harold Buchman; Maurice Rapf
- Produced by: Sol M. Wurtzel
- Starring: Virginia Gilmore; William "Bill" Henry; George Montgomery; Ludwig Stössel; Dorris Bowdon; Rand Brooks
- Cinematography: Virgil Miller
- Music by: Cyril J. Mockridge
- Production company: 20th Century Fox
- Distributed by: 20th Century Fox
- Release date: December 20, 1940
- Running time: 75 minutes
- Country: United States
- Language: English

Jennie is a 1940 American drama film directed by David Burton and written by Harold Buchman and Maurice Rapf. The film stars Virginia Gilmore, William "Bill" Henry, George Montgomery, Ludwig Stössel, Dorris Bowdon and Rand Brooks. The film was released on December 20, 1940, by 20th Century Fox.

== Cast ==
- Virginia Gilmore as Jennie Collins
- William "Bill" Henry as George Schermer
- George Montgomery as Franz Schermer
- Ludwig Stössel as Fritz Schermer
- Dorris Bowdon as Lottie Schermer
- Rand Brooks as Karl Schermer
- Joan Valerie as Clara Schermer
- Rita Quigley as Amelia Schermer
- Hermine Sterler as Mother Schermer
- Harlan Briggs as Mr. Veitch
- Irving Bacon as Real Estate Broker
- Almira Sessions as Mrs. Willoughby
- Aldrich Bowker as Dr. Hildebrand
- Marie Blake as Secondary Role
