= The Grapes of Wrath (film) =

1940 film by John Ford

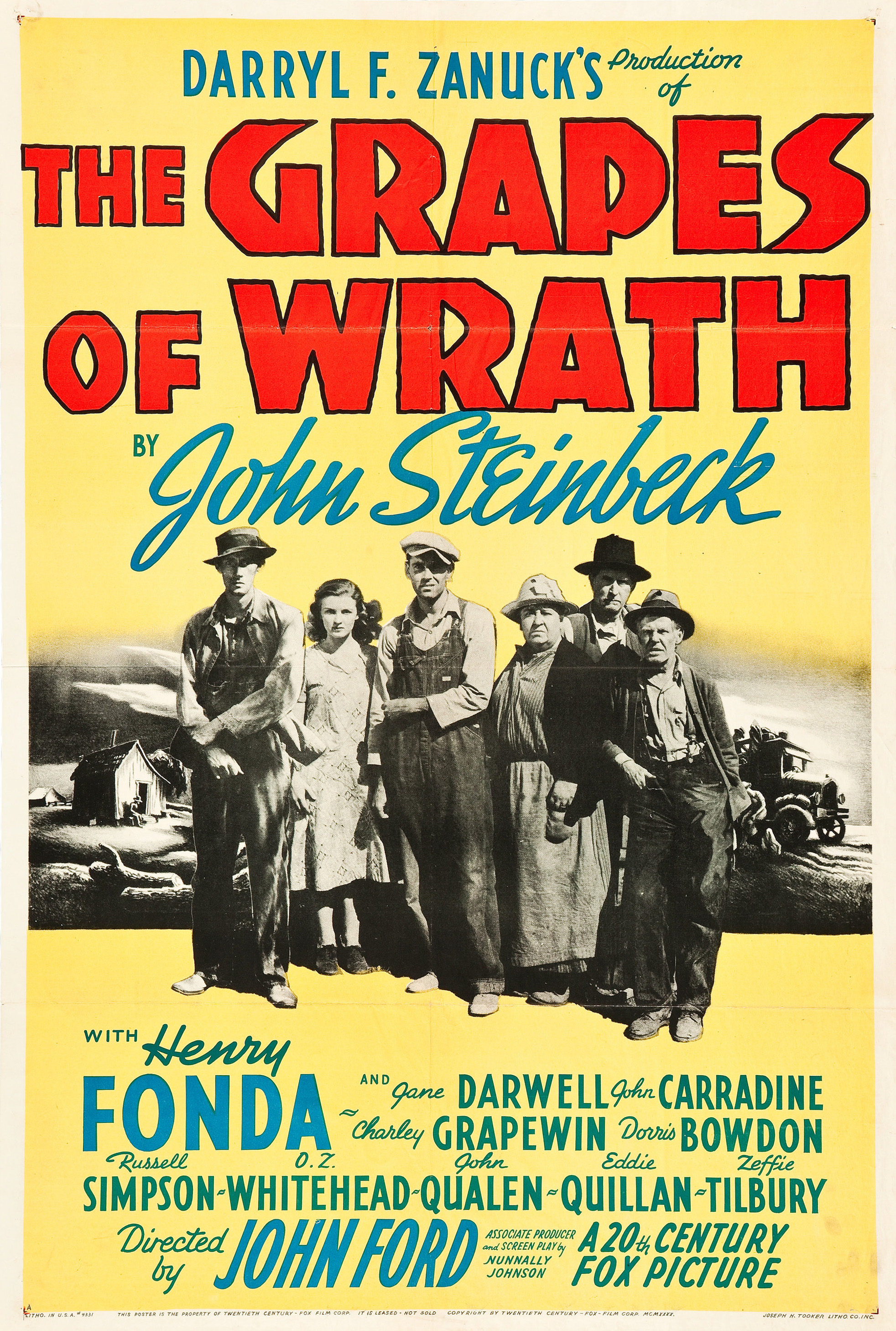
- Theatrical release poster
- Directed by: John Ford
- Screenplay by: Nunnally Johnson
- Based on: The Grapes of Wrath by John Steinbeck
- Produced by: Darryl F. Zanuck; Nunnally Johnson
- Starring: Henry Fonda; Jane Darwell; John Carradine; Shirley Mills; John Qualen; Eddie Quillan
- Cinematography: Gregg Toland
- Edited by: Robert L. Simpson
- Music by: Alfred Newman
- Distributed by: 20th Century-Fox
- Release date: January 24, 1940 (United States)
- Running time: 129 minutes
- Country: United States
- Language: English
- Budget: $800,000
- Box office: $1.6 million (rentals)

The Grapes of Wrath is a 1940 American drama film directed by John Ford. It was based on John Steinbeck's 1939 Pulitzer Prize-winning novel of the same name. The screenplay was written by Nunnally Johnson and the executive producer was Darryl F. Zanuck.

The film tells the story of the Joads, an Oklahoma family of sharecroppers, who, after losing their farm to increased mechanization during the Great Depression in the 1930s, become migrant workers, and end up in California. The motion picture details their arduous journey across the United States as they travel to California in search of work and opportunities for the family members, and features cinematography by Gregg Toland, who was on loan from Samuel Goldwyn Productions.

The film is widely considered to be one of the greatest films of all time. In 1989, it was one of the first 25 films selected by the Library of Congress for preservation in the United States National Film Registry for being "culturally, historically, or aesthetically significant".

== Plot ==
After being released from prison, Tom Joad hitchhikes his way to his share-cropper parents' farm in Oklahoma. Along the way, he comes upon Jim Casy, a former preacher who baptized him, but has since lost his faith. He goes with Tom to the Joad property. It is deserted but they find neighbor Muley Graves, who is hiding out there. Graves describes how the local farmers were forced from their farms by the land deedholders, who knocked down their houses with tractors.

Tom soon reunites with the family at his uncle's house. The Joads are migrating with other evicted families to the promised land of California. They pack everything into a dilapidated car adapted to serve as a truck to make the long journey. Casy decides to accompany them.

The trip along Highway 66 is arduous, and it soon takes a toll on the Joad family. The elderly Grandpa dies along the way. The family parks in a camp and meet a migrant man returning from California. He scoffs at Pa's optimism about opportunities in California and speaks bitterly about his experiences in the West. Grandma dies when they reach California. Eldest son Noah leaves the family.

The family arrives at the first transient migrant campground for workers. The camp is crowded with other starving, jobless, and desperate travelers. Son-in-law Connie deserts his pregnant wife, Rose-of-Sharon. After seeing trouble between the sheriff and an agitator, the Joads hurriedly leave and go to another migrant camp, the Keene Ranch. After working in the fields, they discover the high food prices in the company store, the only one in the area. When a group of migrant workers is striking, Tom wants to learn more about it. He attends a secret meeting in the dark woods. When the gathering is discovered, Casy is killed by a camp guard. Tom inadvertently kills the guard while defending himself.

Tom suffers a serious cheek wound, making him easily recognizable. That evening, the family hides Tom when guards arrive searching for who killed the guard. Tom avoids being spotted, and the family leaves the Keene Ranch without further incident. After driving awhile, they arrive at the Farmworkers' Weedpatch Camp ("Wheat Patch"), a clean facility run by the Department of Agriculture, complete with indoor toilets and showers, which the Joad children have never seen before.

Later, at one of the weekly Saturday night dances held at the Wheat Patch, a group of strangers arrive to instigate a riot as a pretext for local law enforcement to storm the camp and arrest the leaders. The camp committee men have anticipated this and subdue the would-be agitators when they attempt to start a fight, leaving the law no choice but to abort their plan.

Tom is motivated to work for change by what he has witnessed in the various camps. When police officers arrive looking for who murdered the guard that Tom killed, he decides to leave, telling his mother that he plans to carry on Casy's mission by fighting for workers' rights. As the family moves on again, they contemplate the fears and difficulties they faced, with Ma firmly vowing that their kind will continue to live on.

== Cast ==
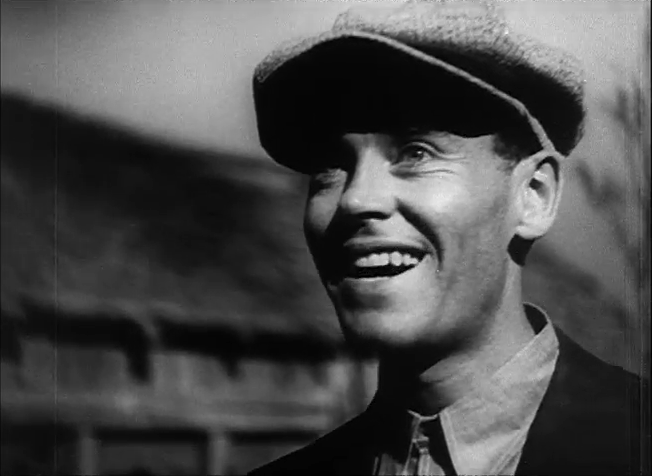
Henry Fonda as Tom Joad

- Henry Fonda as Tom Joad
- Jane Darwell as "Ma" Joad
- John Carradine as Jim Casy
- Charley Grapewin as William James "Grandpa" Joad
- Dorris Bowdon as Rose of Sharon "Rosasharn" Joad
- Russell Simpson as "Pa" Joad
- O. Z. Whitehead as Al Joad
- John Qualen as Muley Graves
- Eddie Quillan as Connie Rivers
- Zeffie Tilbury as Grandma Joad
- Frank Sully as Noah Joad
- Frank Darien as Uncle John
- Darryl Hickman as Winfield Joad
- Shirley Mills as Ruth "Ruthie" Joad
- Roger Imhof as Mr. Thomas
- Grant Mitchell as Caretaker
- Charles D. Brown as Wilkie
- John Arledge as Davis
- Ward Bond as Policeman
- Harry Tyler as Bert
- William Pawley as Bill
- Charles Tannen as Joe
- Selmer Jackson as Inspection Officer
- Charles Middleton as Leader
- Eddie Waller as Proprietor
- Paul Guilfoyle as Floyd
- David Hughes as Frank
- Cliff Clark as City Man
- Joseph Sawyer as Keene Ranch Foreman
- Frank Faylen as Tim
- Adrian Morris as Agent
- Hollis Jewell as Muley's Son
- Robert Homans as Spencer
- Irving Bacon as Driver
- Kitty McHugh as Mae
- Tom Tyler as Deputy (uncredited)
- Joe Bordeaux as Migrant (uncredited)
- Jack Perrin as Migrant (uncredited)
- Frank O'Connor as Deputy #1 (uncredited)
- George O'Hara as Clerk (uncredited)
- Francis Ford as Migrant (uncredited)

== Differences from the novel ==
The first part of the film follows the book fairly closely. However, the second half and the ending in particular are significantly different from the book. While the book ends with the downfall and break-up of the Joad family, the film switches the order of sequences so that the family ends up in a "good" camp provided by the government, and things turn out relatively well for them.

In the novel, Rose-of-Sharon ("Rosasharn") Rivers (played in the film by Dorris Bowdon) gives birth to a stillborn baby. Later, she offers her milk-filled breasts to a starving man, dying in a barn. These scenes were not included in the film.

While the film is somewhat stark, it has a more optimistic and hopeful view than the novel, especially when the Joads land at the Department of Agriculture camp – the clean camp. Also, the producers decided to tone down Steinbeck's political references, such as eliminating a monologue using a land owner's description of "reds" as anybody "that wants thirty cents an hour when we're payin' twenty-five," to show that under the prevalent conditions that definition applies to every migrant worker looking for better wages.

The film emphasizes Ma Joad's pragmatic, forward-looking way of dealing with their situation despite Tom's departure, as it concludes with her spiritual "We're the people" speech.

Ivy and Sairy Wilson, who attend to Grandpa's death and travel with the Joads until they reach California, are left out of the movie entirely. Noah's departure from the family is passed over in the movie. Instead, he simply disappears without explanation. In the book, Floyd tells Tom about how the workers were being exploited, but in the movie he does not appear until after the deputy arrives in Hooverville. Sandry, the religious fanatic who scares Rose-of-Sharon, is left out of the movie.

Vivian Sobchack argued that the film uses visual imagery to focus on the Joads as a family unit, whereas the novel focuses on their journey as a part of the "family of man". She points out that their farm is never shown in detail, and that the family members are never shown working in agriculture; not a single peach is shown in the entire film. This subtly serves to focus the film on the specific family, as opposed to the novel's focus on man and land together.

In the film, most of the Joad family members are either reduced to background characters – in the case of Al, Noah, and Uncle John – or to being the focus of only one or two relatively minor scenes – like Rose-of-Sharon and Connie. Instead, the film is largely concerned with Tom, Ma, and (to a lesser extent) Jim Casy. Thus, despite the film's focus on the Joads as a specific family rather than a part of the "family of man", the movie explores very little of the members of the family itself.

== Soundtrack ==
- Henry Fonda – "Red River Valley" (Traditional)
- Eddie Quillan – "Going Down the Road Feeling Bad" (Traditional)
- "A-Tisket, A-Tasket" (Words and music by Ella Fitzgerald and Van Alexander)

== Production ==
Executive producer Darryl F. Zanuck was nervous about the left-wing political views of the novel, especially the ending. Due to the red-baiting common to the era, Darryl Zanuck sent private investigators to Oklahoma to help him legitimize the film. When Zanuck's investigators found that the "Okies'" predicament was indeed terrible, Zanuck was confident he could defend political attacks that the film was somehow pro-Communist. Critic Roger Ebert believed that World War II also helped sell the film's message, as Communism received a brief respite from American demonizing during that period.

Production on the film began on October 4, 1939, and was completed on November 16, 1939. Some of the filming locations include: Oklahoma City, McAlester, Bridgeport, and Sayre, all in Oklahoma; Gallup, Laguna Pueblo, Santa Rosa, and San Jon, all in New Mexico; Thousand Oaks, Lamont, Needles, Vidal Junction, and the San Fernando Valley, all in California; Topock and the Petrified Forest National Park, both in Arizona.

The film score by Alfred Newman is based on the song "Red River Valley". Additionally, the song "Goin' Down the Road Feelin' Bad" is sung in a nighttime scene at a roadside New Mexico camp.

In an interview with George Bluestone for his 1957 book, Novels into Film: The Metamorphosis of Fiction into Cinema, John Ford confessed, "tersely, but with just the slightest trace of whimsy and bravado," that he had never bothered to read the Steinbeck novel.

== Release ==
The Grapes of Wrath premiered in New York City at the Rivoli theatre on January 24, 1940. Its wide release date in the United States was March 15, 1940. It had a record total of 301 pre-release dates.

It grossed $61,000 in its opening week at the Rivoli, which was its biggest draw since Modern Times in 1936.

Originally allowed to be shown in the Soviet Union in 1948 because of its depiction of the plight of people under capitalism, it was subsequently withdrawn because audiences were noticing that, as shown in the film, even the poorest Americans could afford a car.

== Reception ==
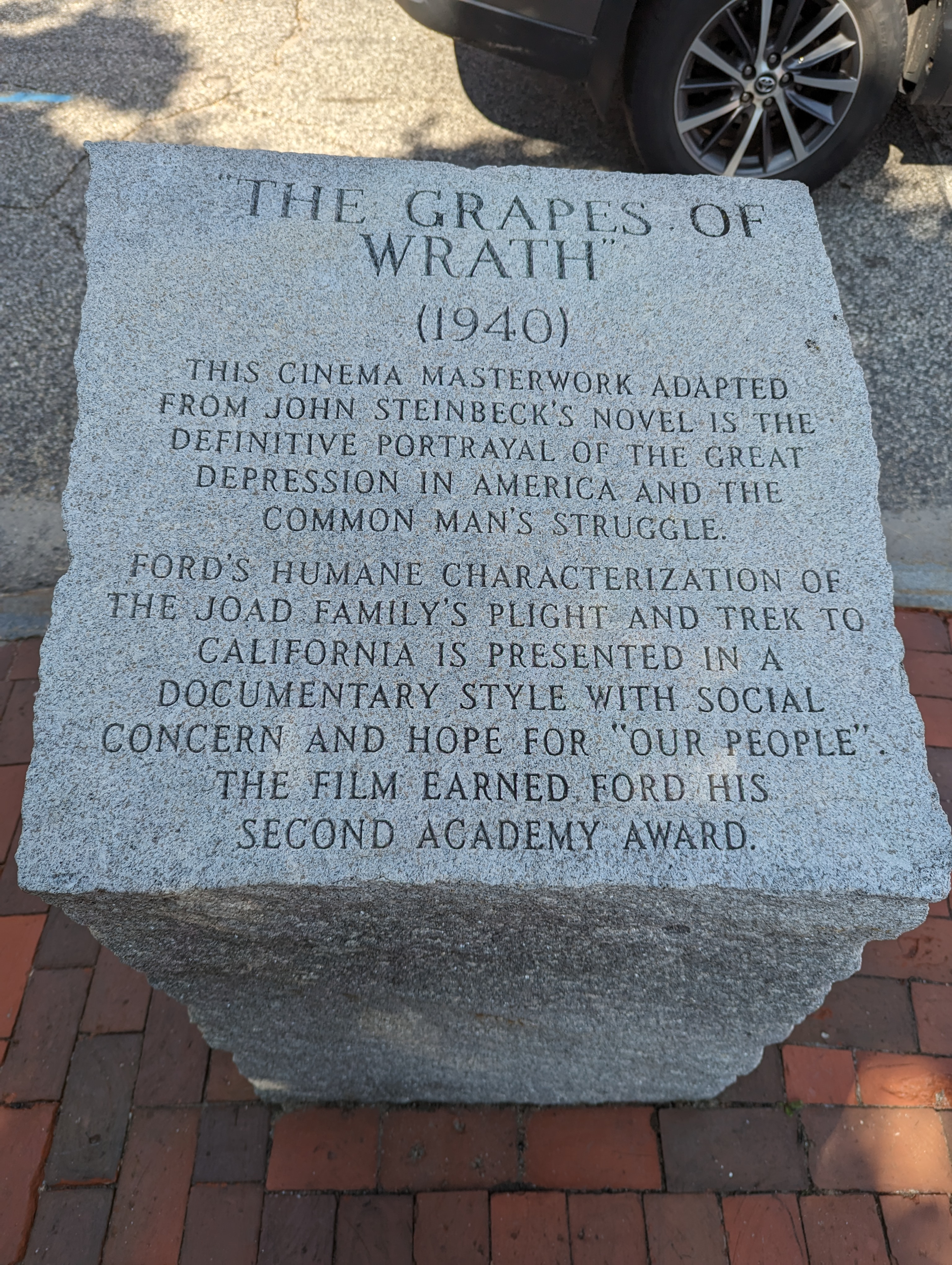
Stone inscription for The Grapes of Wrath at Ford's statue in Portland, Maine.

=== Critical response ===
Boxoffice magazine said that the critical response in New York and Los Angeles was "preponderantly enthusiastic".

Frank Nugent of The New York Times wrote:

"In the vast library where the celluloid literature of the screen is stored there is one small, uncrowded shelf devoted to the cinema's masterworks, to those films which by dignity of theme and excellence of treatment seem to be of enduring artistry, seem destined to be recalled not merely at the end of their particular year but whenever great motion pictures are mentioned. To that shelf of screen classics Twentieth Century-Fox yesterday added its version of John Steinbeck's The Grapes of Wrath, adapted by Nunnally Johnson, directed by John Ford and performed at the Rivoli by a cast of such uniform excellence and suitability that we should be doing its other members an injustice by saying it was "headed" by Henry Fonda, Jane Darwell, John Carradine and Russell Simpson."

Lee Mortimer of the New York Daily Mirror called it "as brave a picture as has yet come out of Hollywood". Archer Winsten of the New York Evening Post said it was "an unusually powerful exposition of a contemporary situation and problem". Eileen Creelman of The Evening Sun referred to it as "a magnificently directed picture that has no trace of entertainment value".

When critic Bosley Crowther retired in 1967, he named The Grapes of Wrath one of the fifty best films ever made.

In a film review written for Time magazine by its editor Whittaker Chambers, he separated his views of Steinbeck's novel from Ford's film, which he liked.

Chambers wrote:

"But people who go to pictures for the sake of seeing pictures will see a great one. For The Grapes of Wrath is possibly the best picture ever made from a so-so book...Camera craft purged the picture of the editorial rash that blotched the Steinbeck book. Cleared of excrescences, the residue is a great human story which made thousands of people, who damned the novel's phony conclusions, read it. It is the saga of an authentic U.S. farming family who lose their land. They wander, they suffer, but they endure. They are never quite defeated, and their survival is itself a triumph."

A review in Variety reported, "Here is outstanding entertainment, projected against a heart-rending sector of the American scene," concluding, "It possesses an adult viewpoint and its success may lead other producers to explore the rich field of contemporary life which films long have neglected and ignored." John Mosher wrote in The New Yorker, "With a majesty never before so constantly sustained on any screen, the film never for an instant falters. Its beauty is of the sort found in the art of Burchfield, Benton and Curry, as the landscape and people involved belong to the world of these painters." Writing in The Nation, critic James Agee explained, "The Hollywood traditions of acting ...are incapable even at best of convincing one, except in the frankest kind of myth. I like the myths very well and some of the actors in them, but when there is any pretense whatever of portraying "real" people—as in The Grapes of Wrath ... such actors are painfully out of place. Acting ... must inevitably develop a tradition, a style, which must as inevitably, in the long run, stultify and destroy itself."

Martin Quigley, the editor of the Motion Picture Herald, acknowledged that the film was well done but said that it was an "emphatic item of evidence in support of the...assertion...that the entertainment motion picture is no place for social, political and economic argument." He said that the "audience import of the picture...becomes a demagogic preachment" and implied possible disbelief of the conditions portrayed "guided by the heavy and designing hand of John Steinbeck". In response, Boxoffice magazine published a detailed response to how factual they felt the film was and Nugent in The New York Times also responded, claiming that Quigley seemed to have very little respect for the mentality of the moviegoer.

The Film Daily year-end poll of 546 critics nationwide ranked The Grapes of Wrath as the second-best film of the year, behind only Hitchcock's Rebecca.

On the review aggregator website Rotten Tomatoes, 100% of 46 critics' reviews are positive, with an average rating of 9.4/10. The website's consensus reads: "A potent drama that is as socially important today as when it was made, The Grapes of Wrath is affecting, moving, and deservedly considered an American classic." Metacritic, which uses a weighted average, assigned the film a score of 96 out of 100, based on 16 critics, indicating "universal acclaim".

In 2006, Writers Guild of America West ranked the film's screenplay 98th in WGA’s list of 101 Greatest Screenplays. In 2016, the Directors Guild of America ranked the film 71st on its list of The 80 Best-Directed Films since the Guild’s founding in 1936.

=== Awards and nominations ===
Award	Category	Nominee(s)	Result
Academy Awards	Outstanding Production	Darryl F. Zanuck and Nunnally Johnson (for 20th Century Fox)	Nominated
Academy Awards	Best Director	John Ford	Won
Academy Awards	Best Actor	Henry Fonda	Nominated
Academy Awards	Best Supporting Actress	Jane Darwell	Won
Academy Awards	Best Screenplay	Nunnally Johnson	Nominated
Academy Awards	Best Film Editing	Robert L. Simpson	Nominated
Academy Awards	Best Sound Recording	Edmund H. Hansen	Nominated
Blue Ribbon Awards	Best Foreign Language Film	John Ford	Won
National Board of Review Awards	Best Film		Won
National Board of Review Awards	Top Ten Films		Won
National Board of Review Awards	Best Acting	Jane Darwell	Won
National Board of Review Awards	Best Acting	Henry Fonda	Won
National Film Preservation Board	National Film Registry		Inducted
New York Film Critics Circle Awards	Best Film		Won
New York Film Critics Circle Awards	Best Director	John Ford (also for The Long Voyage Home)	Won
Online Film & Television Association Awards	Hall of Fame – Motion Picture		Won

American Film Institute recognition

- AFI's 100 Years... 100 Movies – #21
- AFI's 100 Years... 100 Heroes and Villains:
  - Tom Joad – #12 Hero
- 100 Years...100 Cheers – #7
- 100 Years...100 Movies (10th Anniversary) – #23

== Home media ==
The film's trailer

The film was one of the first 50 VHS and Beta tapes released by Magnetic Video in 1977. The film was released on VHS in 1988 by Key Video and Laserdisc by CBS/FOX Video. It was later released in video format on March 3, 1998, by 20th Century Fox on its Studio Classic series.

A DVD was released on April 6, 2004, by 20th Century Fox Entertainment. The DVD contains a special commentary track by scholars Joseph McBride and Susan Shillinglaw. It also includes various supplements: an A&E Network biography of Daryl F. Zanuck, outtakes, a gallery, Franklin D. Roosevelt lauds motion pictures at Academy featurette, Movietone news: three drought reports from 1934, etc.

The film was released on Blu-ray on April 3, 2012, and features all supplemental material from the DVD release.

== See also ==
- List of films with a 100% rating on Rotten Tomatoes, a film review aggregator website
