= Nunnally Johnson =

American screenwriter (1897–1977)

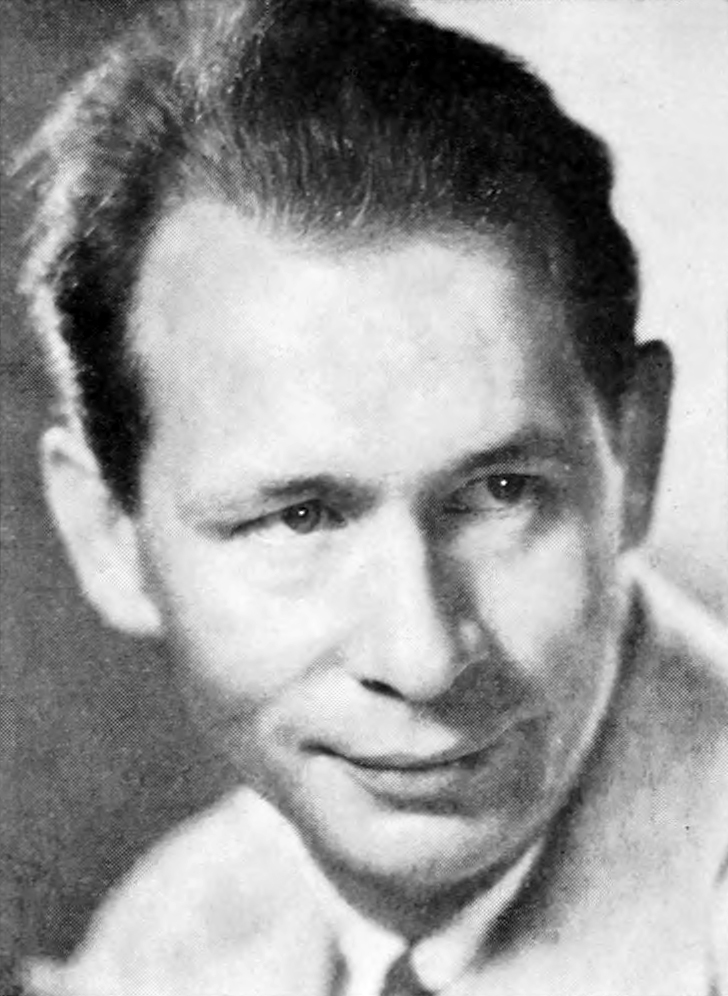
- Johnson in 1939
- Born: Nunnally Hunter Johnson; December 5, 1897; Columbus, Georgia, U.S.
- Died: March 25, 1977 (aged 79); Los Angeles, California U.S.
- Occupations: Director; producer; screenwriter; playwright
- Years active: 1927–1967
- Spouses: Alice Love Mason (m. 1919; div. 1920) Marion Byrnes (m. 1927; div. 1938) Dorris Bowdon (m. 1940)
- Children: 5, including Marjorie Fowler and Nora Johnson

Nunnally Hunter Johnson (December 5, 1897 – March 25, 1977) was an American screenwriter, film director, producer and playwright. As a filmmaker, he wrote the screenplays to more than fifty films in a career that spanned from 1927 to 1967. He also produced more than half of the films he wrote scripts for and directed eight of those movies. In 1940 he was nominated for the Academy Award for Best Adapted Screenplay for The Grapes of Wrath and in 1956, he was nominated for the Directors Guild of America Award for Outstanding Directing – Feature Film for The Man in the Gray Flannel Suit. Some of his other notable films include Tobacco Road (1941), The Moon Is Down (1943), Casanova Brown (1944), The Keys of the Kingdom (1944), The Woman in the Window (1944), The Mudlark (1950), The Desert Fox: The Story of Rommel (1951), My Cousin Rachel (1952), How to Marry a Millionaire (1953), The Three Faces of Eve (1957), Mr. Hobbs Takes a Vacation (1962), and The Dirty Dozen (1967). As a playwright he wrote the books for several Broadway musicals, including the musical revue Shoot the Works (1931), Arthur Schwartz's Park Avenue (1946), Bob Merrill's Henry, Sweet Henry (1967), and Jule Styne's Darling of the Day (1968). He also wrote the 1943 Broadway play The World's Full of Girls.

== Biography ==
=== Early life ===
Nunnally Johnson was born on December 5, 1897, in Columbus, Georgia, the elder of two sons born to Johnnie Pearl (née Patrick) and James Nunnally Johnson. He and his younger brother, Cecil Patrick Johnson, were raised in Columbus. Their father was a journeyman mechanic, turned tinsmith and coppersmith, turned pipe and sheetmetal shop superintendent for the Central of Georgia Railway. His mother founded what later became the PTA in Columbus, and was the first woman to serve on the Muscogee County Board of Education. Johnson Elementary School in Columbus was built and named for her in 1949.

Nunnally graduated from Columbus High School in 1915. While living in Columbus in 1919, at 1312 Third Street, Nunnally was a second lieutenant in the field artillery reserve corps of the U.S. Army during World War I. His brother Cecil graduated from Georgia Tech in 1924, married Gene Clair Norris, and moved to Bellingham, Washington, where he was first a gas department superintendent and later a vice president with Puget Sound Power & Light.

=== Career ===
Johnson began his career as a journalist, writing for the Columbus Enquirer Sun, the Savannah Press, the Brooklyn Daily Eagle, the New York Evening Post and the New York Herald Tribune. He also wrote short stories, and a collection of these stories, titled There Ought to Be a Law, was published in 1930. His first connection with film work was the sale of screen rights to one of his stories in 1927. Johnson asked his editor if he could write film criticism in 1932. When this request was denied, he decided to move to Hollywood and work directly in the film industry.

Finding work as a scriptwriter, Johnson was hired full-time as a writer by 20th Century-Fox in 1935. He began producing films as well and co-founded International Pictures in 1943 with William Goetz. Johnson also directed several films in the 1950s, including two starring Gregory Peck. He was nominated for the Academy Award for Best Screenplay in 1940 for The Grapes of Wrath and the Directors Guild of America Best Director Award in 1956 for The Man in the Gray Flannel Suit. In 1964, Johnson adapted his daughter Nora Johnson's novel, The World of Henry Orient, into a film of the same title, starring Peter Sellers.

=== Personal life ===
His first marriage in 1919 at Trinity Church in Brooklyn Heights, was to Alice Love Mason, with whom he had one daughter, film editor Marjorie Fowler. Mason was an editor with the Brooklyn Daily Eagle. Mason and Johnson divorced in 1920. His second marriage was to Marion Byrnes, in 1927, also a staff member of the Daily Eagle, with whom he also had a daughter, Nora Johnson. Byrnes's and Johnson's marriage ended in 1938.

While filming The Grapes of Wrath, Johnson met his third wife, actress Dorris Bowdon, a Mississippi native. They were married at the home of Charles MacArthur and Helen Hayes in Nyack-on-the-Hudson on February 4, 1940. They had three children. They resided in a mansion located at 625 Mountain Drive in Beverly Hills, California. It was designed by architect Paul R. Williams.

Actor Jack Johnson is his grandson.

=== Death ===
Johnson died of pneumonia in Hollywood in 1977, aged 79 and was interred in the Westwood Village Memorial Park Cemetery in Los Angeles.

== Filmography ==
Year	Title	Writer	Producer	Director
1927	Rough House Rosie	Yes		
1933	A Bedtime Story	Yes		
1933	Mama Loves Papa	Yes		
1934	Moulin Rouge	Yes		
1934	The House of Rothschild	Yes		
1934	Bulldog Drummond Strikes Back	Yes		
1934	Kid Millions	Yes		
1935	Cardinal Richelieu	Uncredited	Yes	
1935	Baby Face Harrington	Yes		
1935	Thanks a Million	Yes		
1935	The Man Who Broke the Bank at Monte Carlo	Yes	Yes	
1936	The Prisoner of Shark Island	Yes	Yes	
1936	The Country Doctor		Yes	
1936	Dimples		Yes	
1936	The Road to Glory	Uncredited	Yes	
1936	Banjo on My Knee	Yes	Yes	
1937	Nancy Steele Is Missing!		Yes	
1937	Cafe Metropole		Yes	
1937	Slave Ship		Yes	
1937	Love Under Fire		Yes	
1939	Jesse James	Yes	Yes	
1939	Wife, Husband and Friend	Yes	Yes	
1939	Rose of Washington Square	Yes	Co-producer	
1940	The Grapes of Wrath	Yes	Yes	
1940	I Was an Adventuress	Uncredited	Yes	
1940	Chad Hanna	Yes	Yes	
1941	Tobacco Road	Yes		
1942	Roxie Hart	Yes	Yes	
1942	Moontide	Uncredited		
1942	The Pied Piper	Yes	Yes	
1942	Life Begins at Eight-Thirty	Yes	Yes	
1943	The Moon Is Down	Yes	Yes	
1943	Holy Matrimony	Yes	Yes	
1944	Casanova Brown	Yes	Yes	
1944	The Keys of the Kingdom	Yes		
1945	The Woman in the Window	Yes	Yes	
1945	The Southerner	Uncredited		
1945	Along Came Jones	Yes		
1946	The Dark Mirror	Yes	Yes	
1947	The Senator Was Indiscreet		Yes	
1948	Mr. Peabody and the Mermaid	Yes	Yes	
1949	Everybody Does It	Yes	Yes	
1950	Three Came Home	Yes	Yes	
1950	The Gunfighter	Uncredited	Yes	
1950	The Mudlark	Yes	Yes	
1951	The Long Dark Hall	Yes		
1951	The Desert Fox: The Story of Rommel	Yes	Yes	
1952	Phone Call from a Stranger	Yes	Yes	
1952	We're Not Married!	Yes	Yes	
1952	O. Henry's Full House	Uncredited		
1952	My Cousin Rachel	Yes	Yes	
1953	How to Marry a Millionaire	Yes	Yes	
1954	Night People	Yes	Yes	Yes
1954	Witness to Murder	Uncredited		
1954	Black Widow	Yes	Yes	Yes
1955	How to Be Very, Very Popular	Yes	Yes	Yes
1956	The Man in the Gray Flannel Suit	Yes	Yes	Yes
1957	Oh, Men! Oh, Women!	Yes	Yes	Yes
1957	The Three Faces of Eve	Yes	Yes	Yes
1959	The Man Who Understood Women	Yes	Yes	Yes
1960	The Angel Wore Red	Yes		Yes
1960	Flaming Star	Yes		
1962	Something's Got to Give	Yes		
1962	Mr. Hobbs Takes a Vacation	Yes		
1963	Take Her, She's Mine	Yes		
1964	The World of Henry Orient	Yes		
1965	Dear Brigitte	Uncredited		
1967	The Dirty Dozen	Yes		

== Bibliography ==
- Johnson, Nunnally (1969). Recollections of Nunnally Johnson oral history transcript. University of California Oral History Program.
- Johnson, Nunnally (1981). Johnson, Dorris; Levanthal, Ellen (eds.). The Letters of Nunnally Johnson. New York: Knopf. ISBN 978-0394506722.
- Lloyd, Craig (April 27, 2006). "Nunnally Johnson (1897–1977)". The New Georgia Encyclopedia. Archived from the original on September 17, 2007.
- Manchel, Frank. (1990). Film Study: An Analytical Bibliography. In Chapter 5 Comparative Literature. Fairleigh Dickinson Univ Press. p. 1252. ISBN 0-8386-3412-5. Google Book Search. Retrieved on March 11, 2009.
