= Those Websters =

Radio series

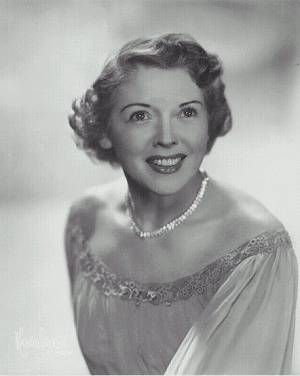
The versatile Fran Allison was heard as a family cousin on Those Websters.

Those Websters was a radio situation comedy series starring Willard Waterman and Constance Crowder as George and Jane Webster. The program was launched in New York and then moved to Chicago for a short spell before finishing its run from Hollywood.

The series replaced That Brewster Boy (1941–45), which starred a teenaged Dick York. Several Brewster cast members continued on with Those Websters, and the two situation comedies were quite similar. The transition is evident in the near-anagram: Brewster=Webster. In a 1991 interview with John Douglas, Dick York explained how That Brewster Boy morphed into Those Websters:

Pauline Hopkins and Owen Vincent were the writer and director of That Brewster Boy. They were sending bundles to the Communists to help fight the Nazis, so naturally they were branded as Communists. The advertising agency came around, hired everyone from under them, and they were going to change the name of the show and get rid of Pauline and Owen. Well, I was fresh out of the slum. It was the first time I ever had any money, but I went to Pauline and Owen and told them straight out that I didn't know what it was all about, but that I was with them. I wouldn't sign with the agency. Of course, I was taken off the show.

Those riotous Websters were heard Friday evenings at 9:30pm on CBS from March 9, 1945 to February 22, 1946 with Quaker Oats as the sponsor. On March 3, 1946, the series moved to Mutual where it aired Sundays at 6pm until August 22, 1948.

== Cast and characters ==
The Webster family lived at 46 River Road in the Chicago suburb of Spring City where George Webster often attended the lodgehall meetings of the Sons of the Mustangs of the Moonlight Mesas. Attempting to prove that "families are fun," those hapless Websters continually encountered confusion, and plans usually went astray during their chaotic misadventures.

Jean Verhagen (later billed as Jean Hagen) played Betty Webster. The children were Liz Webster (Joan Alt) and Billy Webster (Arthur Young, Gil Stratton Jr.), with Bill Idelson as Billy's friend Emil, Jerry Spellman (as Jeep) and Jane Webb (as Belinda Boyd). Fran Allison was heard as a family cousin, and the cast also included Clarence Hartzell, Parley Baer and Eddie Firestone Jr. (1921-2007). Charles Irving announced the program, scripted by Priscilla Kent, Albert G. Miller and Frank and Doris Hursley. Frank Worth led the orchestra.

Two years after this series came to an end, Waterman replaced Harold Peary as the title character in The Great Gildersleeve in 1950.

== Sources ==
- The Great Gildersleeve Journal: "Those Websters: Willard Waterman’s Other Family Sitcom."
