= The Moon Is Down (film) =

1943 film by Irving Pichel

- Directed by: Irving Pichel
- Written by: Nunnally Johnson
- Based on: the novel The Moon Is Down by John Steinbeck
- Produced by: William Goetz and Nunnally Johnson
- Starring: Cedric Hardwicke; Henry Travers; Lee J. Cobb; Dorris Bowdon
- Cinematography: Arthur Miller
- Edited by: Louis Loeffler
- Music by: Alfred Newman
- Production company: 20th Century-Fox
- Distributed by: 20th Century-Fox
- Release dates: March 13, 1943 (Toronto, Canada); March 26, 1943 (New York)
- Running time: 90 minutes
- Country: United States
- Language: English
- Budget: $1.7 million
- Box office: $1.2 million (US rentals)

The Moon Is Down is a 1943 American war film starring Cedric Hardwicke, Lee J. Cobb and Henry Travers and directed by Irving Pichel. The Screenplay was written by Nunnally Johnson and is based on the 1942 novel of the same name by John Steinbeck. This was Dorris Bowdon's last movie, Natalie Wood's first movie; and features an uncredited John Banner, who would go on to play Sgt. Shultz in the TV comedy series Hogan's Heroes.

== Plot ==
During World War II, German soldiers occupy a small Norwegian town. The citizens are forced to work the mines for the German war effort. The Allies attempt to aid the growing resistance movement by dropping canisters filled with explosives, weapons, ammunition, and even chocolate. German soldiers are confounded by the fact that the locals resent them. Several German soldiers are killed or wounded and the townspeople pay a great price for their resistance.

== Cast ==
- Sir Cedric Hardwicke as Col. Lanser
- Henry Travers as Mayor Orden
- Lee J. Cobb as Dr. Albert Winter
- Dorris Bowdon as Molly Morden
- Margaret Wycherly as Sarah Orden
- Peter van Eyck as Lt. Tonder
- William Post Jr. as Alex Morden
- Henry Rowland as Capt. Loft
- E. J. Ballantine as George Corell
- Hans Schumm as Capt. Bentick
- Frederic Brunn as German Soldier (as Frederick Brunn)
- Ernst Deutsch as Maj. Hunter (as Ernest Dorian)
- Ludwig Donath as Hitler's Voice (as Louis Donath)
- John Banner as Lt. Prackle (uncredited)
- Jeff Corey as Albert (uncredited)
- Ludwig Hardt as Elderly Man (uncredited)
- Natalie Wood as Carrie (uncredited)

== Production ==
The set was a place called Brent's Crags, California and was the same set of How Green Was My Valley filmed one year earlier. Filming began on November 18, 1942, and ended January 14, 1943. Editing of the 16mm Film was done at a breakneck pace for the World Premiere in Toronto, Canada on March 13, 1943. The American Première was March 26 and the official American release date was April 9, 1943. Twentieth Century Fox paid $300,000, a record at the time, for the movie rights.

== Reception ==
Bosley Crowther, the film reviewer for The New York Times, gave The Moon Is Down a mixed verdict. He lauded screenwriter Nunnally Johnson for creating a "clear and incisive screen version" of the book, resulting in "a picture which is the finest on captured Norway yet and a powerful expression of faith in the enduring qualities of a people whose hearts are strong." He also praised "Irving Pichel's superlative direction and a generally excellent cast". However, Crowther also observed that "the intellectual nature of this picture—its very clear and dispassionate reasoning—drain it of much of the emotion that one expects in such a story at this time."

It was named one of the 10 best films of the year by the National Board of Review.
