= Jean Hagen =

American actress (1923–1977)

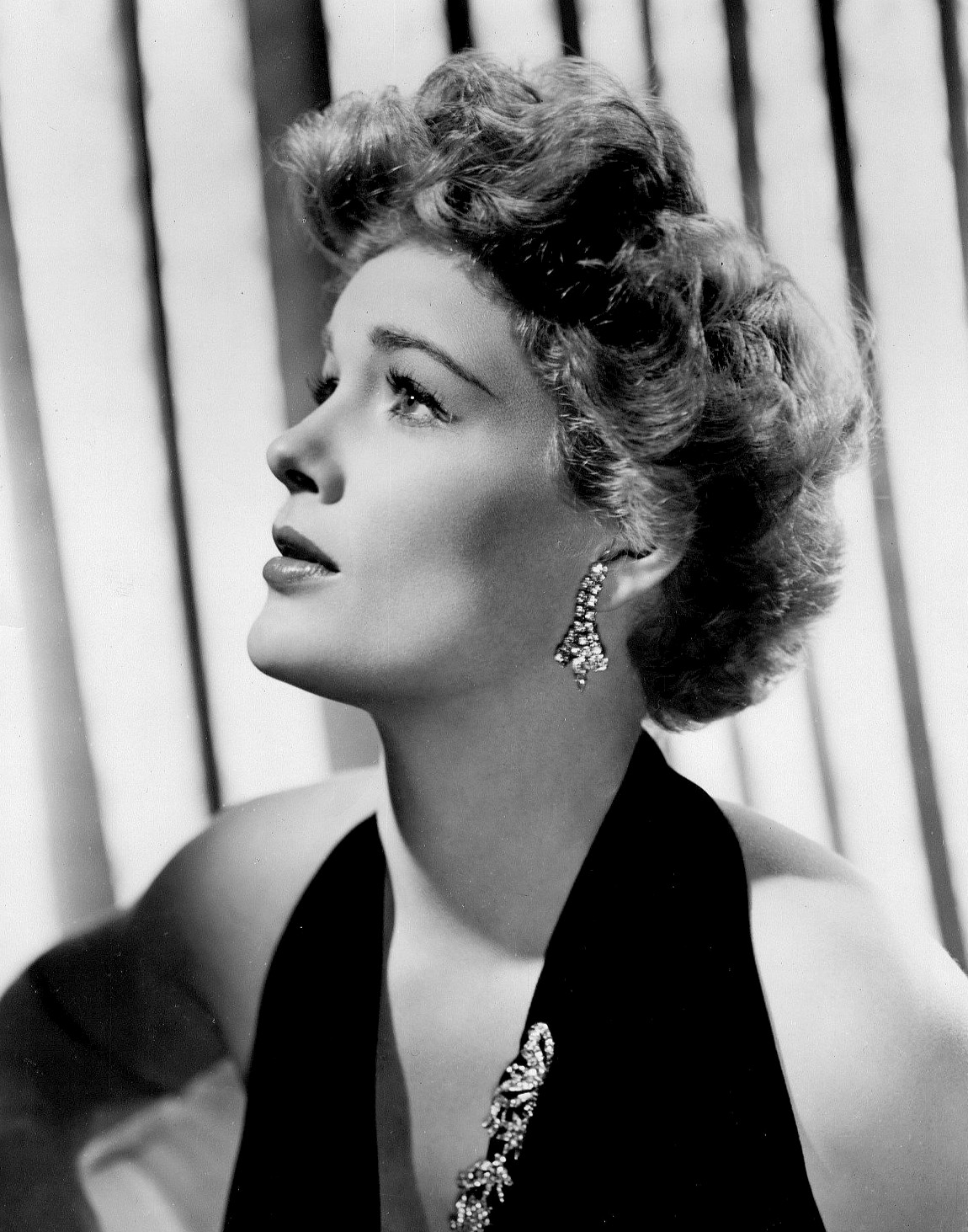
- Hagen in 1955
- Born: Jean Shirley Verhagen; August 3, 1923; Chicago, Illinois, U.S.
- Died: August 29, 1977 (aged 54); Los Angeles, California, U.S.
- Education: Northwestern University
- Occupation: Actress
- Years active: 1945–1977
- Spouse: Tom Seidel (m. 1947; div. 1965)
- Children: 2

Jean Hagen (born Jean Shirley Verhagen; (Note: Her birth name is also reported under the spelling ver Hagen.) August 3, 1923 – August 29, 1977) was an American actress. She was nominated for an Academy Award for Best Supporting Actress for her portrayal of Lina Lamont in Singin' in the Rain (1952), and for three Primetime Emmy Awards for playing Margaret Williams on the first three seasons (1953–56) of the television sitcom The Danny Thomas Show (when titled as Make Room for Daddy). She was also known for her role as Doll Conovan in the classic film noir The Asphalt Jungle (1950).

== Early life and education ==
Hagen was born August 3, 1923, in Chicago, Illinois, to Christian Verhagen, a Dutch immigrant, and Marie, his Chicago-born wife. The family moved to Elkhart, Indiana, when she was 12, and she graduated from Elkhart High School.

She studied drama at Northwestern University, where she was a roommate of actress Patricia Neal. Hagen graduated from Northwestern in 1945. She also worked as an usher.

== Career ==
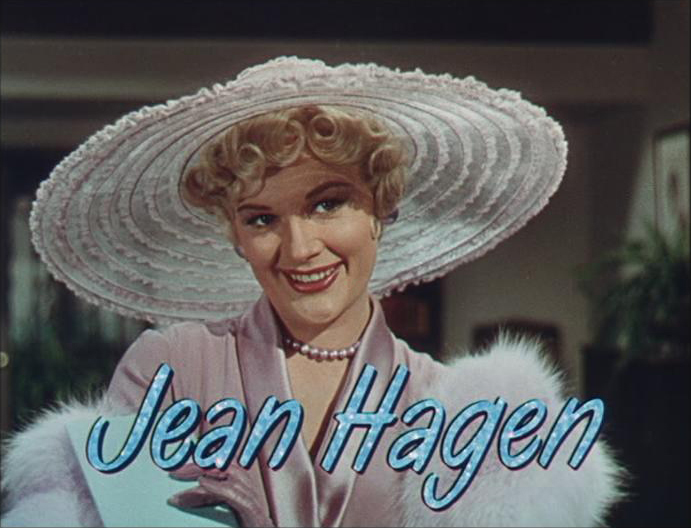
Hagen in Singin' in the Rain (1952)

=== Radio ===
Hagen's career began on radio in the 1940s, performing in Light of the World, Hollywood Story, and other programs. Billed under her birth name, she played Betty Webster on Those Websters.

=== Stage ===
Hagen first appeared on Broadway in Swan Song. She acted in Another Part of the Forest, Ghosts, and The Traitor. She was the understudy for Judy Holliday in Born Yesterday, and replaced her in the latter part of the run.

=== Film and television ===
Her film debut was as a comical femme fatale in the 1949 Spencer Tracy and Katharine Hepburn film Adam's Rib, directed by George Cukor. The Asphalt Jungle (1950) provided Hagen with her first starring role. Hagen played "Doll" Conovan, a woman who sticks by criminal Dix's side until the bitter end. She appeared in the film noir Side Street (1950), playing a gangster's sincere but dim girlfriend. Hagen gave a memorable comic performance in Singin' in the Rain as the vain, spoiled, and talentless silent film star Lina Lamont. She received an Academy Award nomination for Best Supporting Actress for her performance.

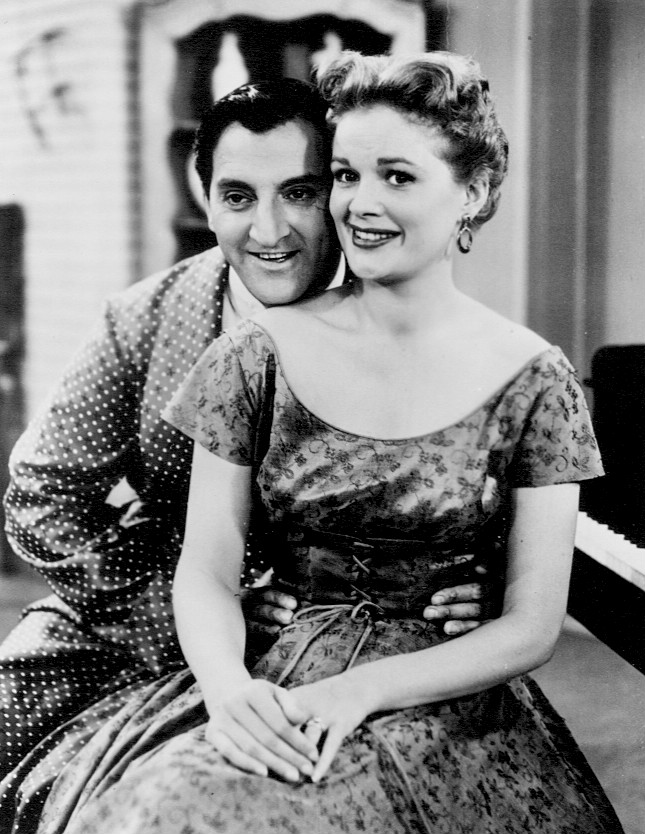
Thomas and Hagen in Make Room for Daddy (1955)

By 1953, she had joined the cast of the television sitcom Make Room for Daddy. After she left the show, Marjorie Lord was cast as Danny's second wife and played opposite Thomas for the remainder of the series.

In 1957, Hagen co-starred in an episode of Alfred Hitchcock Presents titled "Enough Rope for Two", portraying a woman who accompanies two thieves trying to retrieve stolen money from a desert mine shaft. She then appeared as Elizabeth in the 1960 episode "Once Upon a Knight" on The DuPont Show with June Allyson; Also in 1960, Hagen was Marie Brandt on Wagon Train in the episode "The Marie Brandt Story"; and in 1963 Hagen portrayed Sarah Proctor on Wagon Train in the episode “The Sarah Proctor Story”. The following year, she guest-starred on The Andy Griffith Show in the episode "Andy and the Woman Speeder".

Although she made frequent guest appearances in television series, Hagen was unable to resume her film career in starring roles. Her health began to decline due to an alcohol problem and she spent many years hospitalized or under medical care in the 1960s. After appearing with Fred MacMurray in the Disney comedy The Shaggy Dog (1959), for the remainder of her career she played supporting roles, such as Marguerite LeHand, personal secretary to Franklin Delano Roosevelt, in Sunrise at Campobello (1960) and the friend of Bette Davis in Dead Ringer (1964).

Much later, in 1976, she made a comeback of sorts playing character roles in episodes of the television series Starsky and Hutch and The Streets of San Francisco. She made her final acting appearance the next year in the television movie Alexander: The Other Side of Dawn.

== Honors ==
Hagen received a star on the Hollywood Walk of Fame at 1502 Vine Street for her contributions to television.

== Personal life ==
Jean Hagen married actor Tom Seidel in the Brentwood neighborhood of Los Angeles on June 12, 1947. He originated the role of Dr. Sanderson in the play Harvey. The couple had two children, Christine Patricia and Aric Phillip. According to Lorraine LoBianco, Seidel divorced Hagen and gained custody of their children in order to dissuade her from drinking. Hagen's alcoholism, instead, turned more severe. In 1968, her addiction left her hospitalized and in a coma at UCLA Medical Center. Her daughter said that after Hagen recovered, she never drank again.

=== Later life and death ===
Hagen was later diagnosed with esophageal cancer. Patricia Neal wrote in her autobiography that Hagen went to Germany "'for laetrile, a supposed cure unavailable in the United States. But she was bubbly and bright and so much the way I remembered her from the old days.'"

Hagen died of cancer on August 29, 1977, at the Motion Picture & Television Country House and Hospital just 26 days after turning 54.

== Filmography ==
=== Film ===
Year	Title	Role	Notes
1949	Adam's Rib	Beryl Caighn	
1950	Ambush	Martha Conovan	
1950	Side Street	Hariette Sinton	
1950	The Asphalt Jungle	"Doll" Conovan	
1950	A Life of Her Own	Maggie Collins	
1951	Night Into Morning	Girl Next Door	
1951	No Questions Asked	Joan Brensen	
1952	Shadow in the Sky	Stella Murphy	
1952	Singin' in the Rain	Lina Lamont	
1952	Carbine Williams	Maggie Williams	
1953	Arena	Meg Hutchins	
1953	Latin Lovers	Anne Kellwood	
1953	Half a Hero	Martha Dobson	
1955	The Big Knife	Connie Bliss	
1957	Spring Reunion	Barna Forrest	
1959	The Shaggy Dog	Freeda Daniels	
1960	Sunrise at Campobello	Marguerite "Missy" LeHand	
1962	Panic in Year Zero	Ann Baldwin	
1964	Dead Ringer	Dede Marshall	

=== Television ===
Year	Title	Role	Notes
1953–56	Make Room for Daddy	Margaret Williams	Main cast; Seasons 1–3
1957	Alfred Hitchcock Presents	Madge Griffin	Episode: "Enough Rope for Two"
1960	Wagon Train	Marie Brandt	Episode: "The Marie Brandt story"
1962	Wagon Train	Sarah Proctor	Episode: "The Sarah Proctor Story"
1961	The Andy Griffith Show	Elizabeth Crowley	Episode: "Andy and the Woman Speeder"
1976	Starsky & Hutch	Belle Kates	Episode: "The Hostages"
1976	The Streets of San Francisco	Ms. Unger	Episode: "Judgement Day"
1977	Alexander: The Other Side of Dawn	Landlady	Television film

== Radio appearances ==
Year	Program	Episode/source
1952	Stars in the Air	The Yearling

== Partial stage appearances ==
Year	Title	Role	Venue	Notes	Ref.
1946-47	Another Part of the Forest	Laurette Sincee	Fulton Theatre, New York City		
1946-49	Born Yesterday	Billie Dawn	Lyceum Theatre, New York City	Understudy; Replacement after November 1948	
1946-49	Born Yesterday	Billie Dawn	Henry Miller's Theatre, New York City	Understudy; Replacement after November 1948	
1948	Ghosts	Regina Engstrand	Cort Theatre, New York City		
1949	The Traitor	Eva McKeon	48th Street Theatre, New York City		

== Awards and nominations ==
Award	Year	Category	Work	Result	Ref.
Academy Award	1953	Best Supporting Actor	Singin' in the Rain	Nominated	
Primetime Emmy Award	1955	Best Supporting Actress in a Regular Series	Make Room for Daddy	Nominated	
Primetime Emmy Award	1956	Best Actress in a Supporting Role	Make Room for Daddy	Nominated	
Primetime Emmy Award	1956	Best Actress - Continuing Performance	Make Room for Daddy	Nominated	
