= Willard Waterman =

American actor (1914–1995)

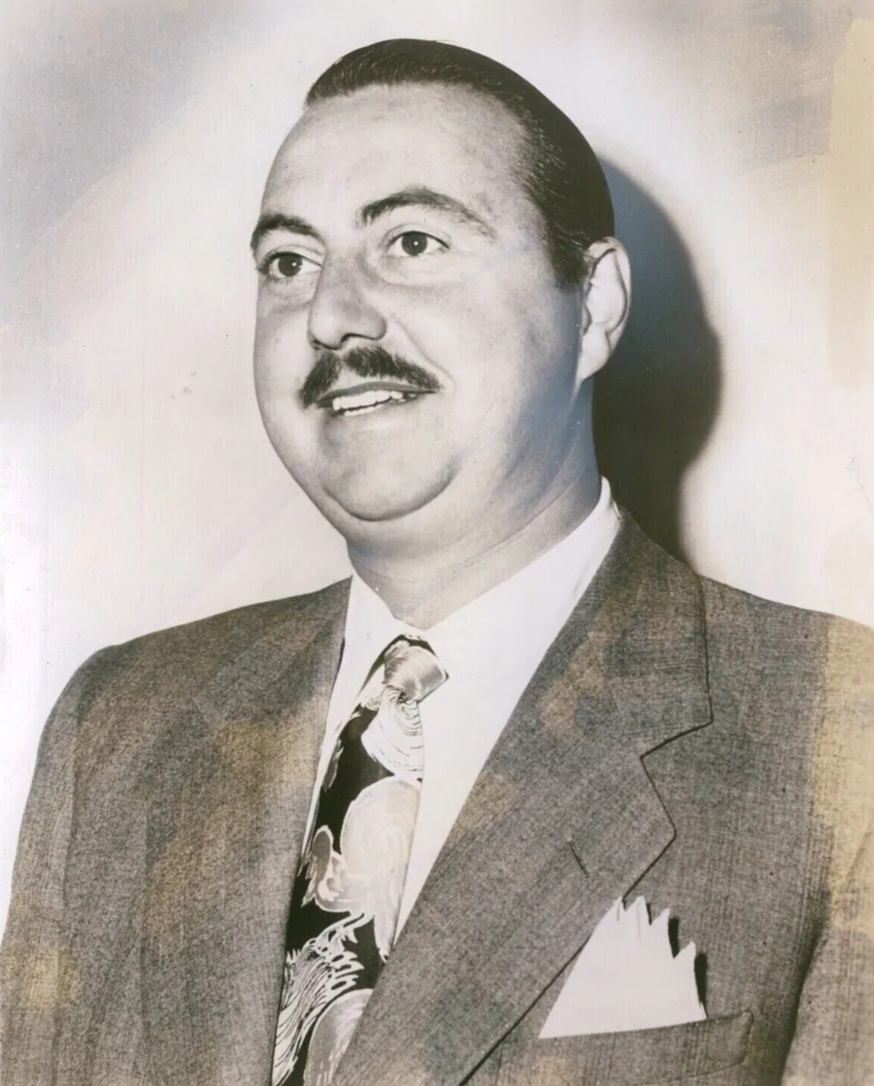
- Waterman in The Halls of Ivy (1950)
- Born: Willard Lewis Waterman; August 29, 1914; Madison, Wisconsin, U.S.
- Died: February 2, 1995 (aged 80); Burlingame, California, U.S.
- Years active: 1949–1973
- Spouse: Mary Anna Theleen (m. 1937)
- Children: 2

Willard Lewis Waterman (August 29, 1914 – February 2, 1995) was an American character actor in films, TV and on radio, remembered best for replacing Harold Peary as the title character of The Great Gildersleeve at the height of that show's popularity.

== Early years ==
In the mid-1930s, Waterman attended the University of Wisconsin, where he joined Theta Chi, acted in student plays, and was a friend of Uta Hagen. His growing interest in theater put an end to his original plan to be an engineer, and he gained experience in radio at the university's station, WHA.

== Radio ==
Waterman began his radio career at WIBA in Madison, singing in a quartet that performed "musical interludes between programs," and came to NBC in Chicago in early 1936.

Waterman replaced Harold Peary on The Great Gildersleeve in 1950, after Peary was unable to convince sponsor and show owner Kraft Cheese to allow him an ownership stake in the show. Impressed with better capital-gains deals CBS was willing to offer performers in the high-tax late 1940s, he decided to move from NBC to CBS during the latter's famous talent raids. Kraft, however, refused to move the show to CBS and hired Waterman to replace Peary as the stentorian Throckmorton P. Gildersleeve.

Peary and Waterman already knew each other from earlier radio jobs. Not only did the two men become longtime friends, but Waterman—who looked as though he could have been Peary's sibling and whose voice was a near-match for Peary's—refused to appropriate the half-leering, half-embarrassed laugh Peary had made a Gildersleeve trademark. He stayed with The Great Gildersleeve from 1950 to 1957 on radio and in a short-lived television series syndicated in 1955.

At the same time he was heard as Gildersleeve, Waterman had a recurring role as Mr. Merriweather in the short-lived but respected radio comedy vehicle for Ronald Colman and his wife Benita Hume, The Halls of Ivy. Waterman's pre-Gildersleeve radio career had included at least one starring vehicle, a short-lived situation comedy, Those Websters, that premiered in 1945.

He had radio roles between the mid-1930s and 1950 on such shows as Chicago Theater of the Air (variety) and Harold Teen (comedy), plus four soap operas: Girl Alone, The Guiding Light, Lonely Women, The Road of Life and Kay Fairchild, Stepmother.

== Film ==
Waterman is remembered for his role as Claude Upson in the 1958 film Auntie Mame. He was also seen in Riding High, Three Coins in the Fountain, and The Apartment.

== Stage ==
Waterman was in two Broadway productions of the musical Mame (the 1966 original and the 1983 revival) and the 1973 Broadway revival of The Pajama Game. He also toured in the national companies of How to Succeed in Business Without Really Trying and A Funny Thing Happened on the Way to the Forum.

== Television ==
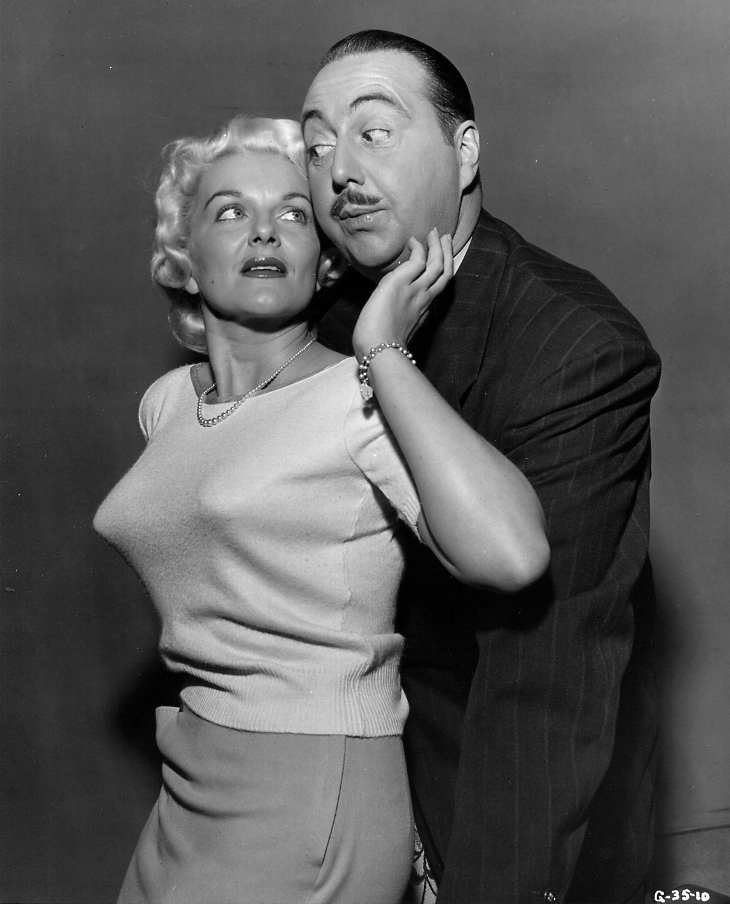
Willard Waterman (right) and Stephanie Griffin (left) in the TV series The Great Gildersleeve, 1955

Waterman's later career included a variety of film and TV supporting roles on such shows as a short-lived television adaptation of The Great Gildersleeve, Vacation Playhouse, Lawman, My Favorite Martian, Bat Masterson, The Eve Arden Show (four episodes from 1957 to 1958 as Carl Foster), 77 Sunset Strip, Bonanza, The Dick Van Dyke Show, Guestward Ho!, F Troop, and Dennis the Menace, in which he played the lovable grocer, Mr. Quigley. Between 1957 and 1959, he appeared five times as Mac Maginnis in the ABC sitcom The Real McCoys starring Walter Brennan.

Waterman was all but retired from acting after 1973, although in 1980 he appeared in the "Boss and Peterson" radio commercial for Sony, for which he received a Clio Award.

== Labor activities ==
In 1937, Waterman was a founding member of the radio union known as the American Federation of Television and Radio Artists. One obituary noted, "He was believed to be the only person to have served as a member of the union's board of directors in four different locales: Chicago, Los Angeles, San Francisco and New York."

== Personal life and death ==
In 1937, Waterman married Mary Anna Theleen, a secretary to the president of Nash Motors in Kenosha, Wisconsin.

Waterman lived in Chicago, and New York City.

In 1945, Waterman moved his family to the San Fernando Valley in Southern California.

After 1980, Waterman lived in Burlingame, California, near a daughter.

Waterman died of bone marrow disease on February 2, 1995, at his home in Burlingame, California.

== Recognition ==
Waterman has a star in the Radio section of the Hollywood Walk of Fame.

== Filmography ==
Year	Title	Role	Notes
1949	Flaming Fury	Dutch	Uncredited
1949	Flame of Youth	Steve Miller	
1949	Free for All	Commander H.C. Christie	
1950	No Man of Her Own	Jack Olsen	Uncredited
1950	Ma and Pa Kettle Go to Town	J.J. Schumacher	Uncredited
1950	Riding High	Arthur Winslow	
1950	Father of the Bride	Vincent Dixon - Engagement Party Guest	Uncredited
1950	Louisa	Dick Stewart	
1950	The Lawless	Pawling	Uncredited
1950	Mystery Street	A Mortician	
1950	Three Secrets	Max	Uncredited
1950	Hit Parade of 1951	Oilman	Uncredited
1950	Mrs. O'Malley and Mr. Malone	Mr. Ogle	
1950	Watch the Birdie	Mayor	Uncredited
1951	Fourteen Hours	Mr. Harris	Uncredited
1951	Francis Goes to the Races	Exerciser	Uncredited
1951	Darling, How Could You!	Theatre Manager	
1951	Rhubarb	Orlando Dill	
1951	Sunny Side of the Street	John 'J.R.' Stevens	
1952	Has Anybody Seen My Gal	Dr. Wallace	Uncredited
1953	It Happens Every Thursday	Myron Trout	
1953	Half a Hero	Charles McEstway	
1954	Three Coins in the Fountain	Mr. Hoyt	Uncredited
1955	Three for the Show	TV show Moderator	Uncredited
1955	How to Be Very, Very Popular	Speaker	
1956	Hollywood or Bust	Manager Neville	Uncredited; final Martin & Lewis film
1958	Auntie Mame	Claude Upson	
1959	Bat Masterson	Bank Manager	
1960	The Apartment	Mr. Vanderhoff	
1962	The Joey Bishop Show	Johnathan Flint.	1 episode
1962	Mister Ed	Mr. Douglas	Episode- Ed's New Neighbors
1962	Mister Ed	Mr. Halsted	Episode 69 - Unemployment Show
1962	Walk on the Wild Side	Man Listening to Speech	Uncredited
1963	My Favorite Martian	Mr. Trimble	Episode- There is No Cure for the Common Martian
1963	Dennis the Menace	Mr. Quigley	Episode - The Big Basketball Game
1964	Get Yourself a College Girl	Senator Hubert Morrison	
1972	Hail	Vice President	(final film role)

== Radio appearances ==
Year	Program	Episode/source
1948	Screen Guild Players	Up in Central Park
1949	Escape	Red Wine
