= They Gave Him a Gun =

1937 film by W. S. Van Dyke

- Theatrical release poster
- Directed by: W. S. Van Dyke
- Written by: Cyril Hume; Richard Maibaum; Maurice Rapf
- Based on: They Gave Him a Gun; 1936 novel by William J. Cowen
- Produced by: Harry Rapf
- Starring: Spencer Tracy; Gladys George; Franchot Tone
- Cinematography: Harold Rosson
- Edited by: Ben Lewis
- Music by: Sigmund Romberg
- Production company: Metro-Goldwyn-Mayer
- Distributed by: Loew's Inc.
- Release date: May 7, 1937
- Running time: 94 minutes
- Country: United States
- Language: English
- Budget: $606,000
- Box office: $1,313,000

They Gave Him a Gun is a 1937 American crime drama film directed by W. S. Van Dyke and starring Spencer Tracy, Gladys George and Franchot Tone. The picture bears a resemblance to later films noir, with its dark theme regarding the struggles and failures of a man trying to take a criminal shortcut to the American dream. The screenplay was written by Cyril Hume, Richard Maibaum and Maurice Rapf, based on the 1936 book of the same name by William J. Cowen. On March 20, 1937, director W.S. Van Dyke "announced Henry Mahan was cast in 'They Gave Him A Gun', joining Sam Levene and Teddy Hart, the three swell comedians in the film version of Three Men on a Horse", but none of these actors appear in the final cut.

== Plot ==
A young man named Jimmy unexpectedly becomes a World War I hero by killing all the Germans in a machine gun nest. But he is severely wounded, and spends time in a hospital being cared for by a nurse, Rose, with whom he falls in love. But she is really in love with Jimmy's buddy, Fred, a carnival barker. However, when Fred does not return from the battlefield, the two think he has been killed (he was merely captured), so they make wedding plans. When Fred returns, he decides to support Jimmy and Rose marrying, although it breaks his heart. After the war, Fred meets with Jimmy, and discovers that Jimmy is a racketeer who uses his battle skills to commit murder. So he tells Rose, who had no idea. She reports her husband to the police, so that he will go to prison and be reformed. But Jimmy breaks out of prison, and tries to take Rose on the lam with him. Fred intervenes. Jimmy, feeling undeserving, dies by suicide by police.

== Cast ==
- Spencer Tracy as Fred P. Willis
- Gladys George as Rose Duffy
- Franchot Tone as James "Jimmy" Davis
- Edgar Dearing as Sergeant Meadowlark
- Mary Lou Treen as Saxe
- Cliff Edwards as Laro
- Charles Trowbridge as Judge
- Ward Bond as Military Policeman (uncredited)

== Box office ==
According to MGM records, the film earned $718,000 in the US and Canada, and $595,000 elsewhere, resulting in a profit of $253,000.
