= Cliff Edwards =

American musician and actor (1895–1971)

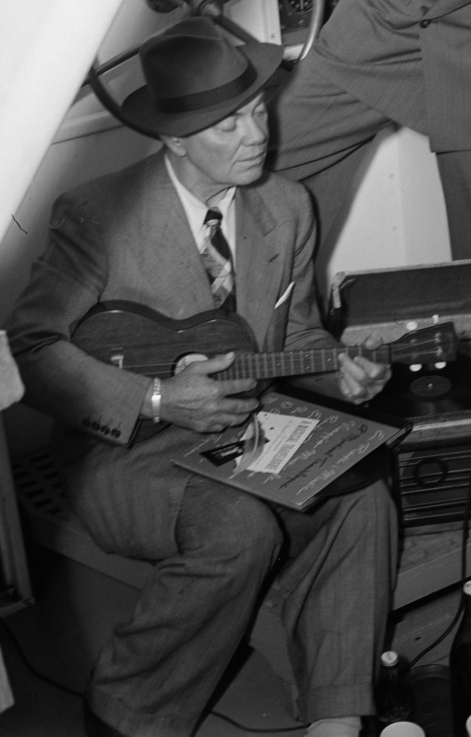
- Edwards in 1947
- Born: June 14, 1895; Hannibal, Missouri, U.S.
- Died: July 17, 1971 (aged 76); Hollywood, California, U.S.
- Resting place: Valhalla Memorial Park Cemetery
- Other name: Ukulele Ike
- Occupations: Musician; actor
- Years active: 1918–1971
- Spouses: Gertrude Ryrholm (m. 1919; div. 1923) Irene Wylie (m. 1923; div. 1931) Judith Barrett (m. 1932; div. 1936)
- Musical career
- Genres: vaudeville
- Instruments: Vocals; ukulele
- Labels: Audiophile Records; Walt Disney Records

Cliff Edwards (June 14, 1895 – July 17, 1971), nicknamed "Ukulele Ike", was an American pop singer, musician and actor. He enjoyed considerable popularity in the 1920s and early 1930s, specializing in jazzy renditions of pop standards and novelty tunes, including "Singin' in the Rain" in 1929. Later in his career, he appeared in films and did voices for animated cartoons, and is well-remembered as the voice of Jiminy Cricket in Walt Disney's Pinocchio (1940) (introducing the standard "When You Wish Upon a Star") and Fun and Fancy Free (1947), and Dandy Crow in Walt Disney's Dumbo (1941).

== Early life and musical career ==
Edwards was born in Hannibal, Missouri. He left school at age 14 and soon moved to St. Louis, Missouri, and St. Charles, Missouri, where he entertained as a singer in saloons. As many places had pianos in bad shape or none at all, Edwards taught himself to play ʻukulele to serve as his own accompanist (choosing it because it was the cheapest instrument in the music shop). He was nicknamed "Ukulele Ike" by a waiter who couldn't remember his name. He got his first break in 1918 at the Arsonia Cafe in Chicago, Illinois, where he performed a song called "Ja-Da", written by the club's pianist, Bob Carleton. Edwards and Carleton made it a hit on the vaudeville circuit. Vaudeville headliner Joe Frisco hired Edwards as part of his act, which was featured at the Palace in New York City—the most prestigious vaudeville theater—and later in the Ziegfeld Follies.

Edwards made his first phonograph records in 1919. He recorded early examples of jazz scat singing in 1922. The following year he signed a contract with Pathé Records. He became one of the most popular singers of the 1920s, appearing in several Broadway shows. He recorded many of the pop and novelty hits of the day, including "California, Here I Come", "Hard Hearted Hannah", "Yes Sir, That's My Baby", and "I'll See You in My Dreams". Some of the labels of Edwards' early recordings identify him as "Ukelele Ike," a then common misspelling of "ukulele."

In 1924, Edwards performed as the headliner at the Palace, the pinnacle of his vaudeville success. That year he also featured in George and Ira Gershwin's first Broadway musical Lady Be Good, alongside Fred and Adele Astaire. As a recording artist, his hits included "Paddlin’ Madeleine Home" (1925), "I Can't Give You Anything but Love" (1928), and the classic "Singin' in the Rain" (1929), which he introduced. Edwards's own compositions included "(I'm Cryin' 'Cause I Know I'm) Losing You", "You're So Cute (Mama o' Mine)", "Little Somebody of Mine", and "I Want to Call You 'Sweet Mama'". He also recorded a few "off-color" novelty songs for under-the-counter sales, including "I'm a Bear in a Lady's Boudoir", "Mr. Insurance Man", and "Give It to Mary with Love".

Edwards, more than any other performer, was responsible for the soaring popularity of the ʻukulele. Millions of ʻukuleles were sold during the decade, and Tin Pan Alley publishers added ʻukulele chords to standard sheet music. Edwards always played American Martin ukuleles, favoring the small soprano model in his early career. In his later years, he moved to the larger tenor ʻukulele, which was becoming popular in the 1930s.

Edwards continued to record until shortly before his death in 1971. His last record album, Ukulele Ike, was released posthumously on the independent Glendale label. He reprised many of his 1920s hits; his failing health was however evident in the recordings.

== Film, radio, and television ==
In 1929, Cliff Edwards was playing at the Orpheum Theater in Los Angeles where he caught the attention of movie producer-director Irving Thalberg. His film company Metro-Goldwyn-Mayer hired Edwards to appear in early sound movies. After performing in some short films, Edwards was one of the stars in the feature The Hollywood Revue of 1929, doing some comic bits and singing some numbers, including the film debut of his hit "Singin' in the Rain". He appeared in a total of 33 films for MGM through 1933. He had a small role as Mike, playing a ʻukulele very briefly at the beginning of the 1931 movie Laughing Sinners (1931), starring Joan Crawford.

Edwards had a friendly working relationship with MGM's comedy star Buster Keaton, who featured Edwards in three of his films. Keaton, himself a former vaudevillian, enjoyed singing and harmonized with Edwards between takes. One of these casual jam sessions was captured on film, in Doughboys (1930), in which Keaton and Edwards scat-sing their way through "You Never Did That Before".

Edwards was also an occasional supporting player in feature films and short subjects at Warner Bros. and RKO Radio Pictures. He played a wisecracking sidekick to Western star George O'Brien, and he filled in for Allen Jenkins as "Goldie" opposite Tom Conway in The Falcon Strikes Back. In a 1940 short, he led a cowboy chorus in Cliff Edwards and His Buckaroos. Throughout the 1940s he appeared in a number of "B" Westerns playing the comic, singing sidekick to the hero, seven times with Charles Starrett and six with Tim Holt.

External image
- Cliff Edwards as a wounded soldier in Gone With the Wind (1939), with Vivien Leigh and Olivia de Havilland. (In the final film, Edwards is not visible.)

Edwards appeared in the darkly sardonic Western comedy The Bad Man of Brimstone (1937), and he played the character "Endicott" in the screwball comedy film His Girl Friday (1940). In 1939, he voiced the off-screen wounded Confederate soldier in Gone with the Wind in a hospital scene with Vivien Leigh and Olivia de Havilland.

His most famous voice role was as Jiminy Cricket in Walt Disney's Pinocchio (1940), where he sings "Give a Little Whistle" and "When You Wish Upon a Star". Edwards's rendition of "When You Wish Upon a Star" is probably his most familiar recorded legacy. He voiced the head crow in Disney's Dumbo (1941) and sang "When I See an Elephant Fly".

In 1932, Edwards had his first national radio show on CBS Radio. He continued hosting network radio shows through 1946. In the early 1930s, however, Edwards' popularity faded as public taste shifted to crooners such as Russ Columbo, Rudy Vallee, and Bing Crosby.

Arthur Godfrey's use of the ʻukulele spurred a surge in its popularity and those that played it, including Edwards. Like many vaudeville stars, Edwards was an early arrival on television. In the 1949 season, he starred in The Cliff Edwards Show, a three-days-a-week (Monday, Wednesday, and Friday evenings) TV variety show on CBS. In the 1950s and early 1960s, he made appearances on The Mickey Mouse Club, in addition to performing his Jiminy Cricket voice for various Disney shorts and the Disney Christmas spectacular, From All of Us to All of You.

== Personal life ==
Edwards was careless with the money he made in the 1920s, always trying to sustain his expensive habits and lifestyle. He continued working during the Great Depression, but never again enjoyed his former prosperity. Most of his income went to alimony for his three former wives, and paying debts, and he declared bankruptcy four times during the 1930s and early 1940s. Edwards married his first wife Gertrude (Benson) Ryrholm in 1917. Their marriage ended in divorce four years later. He married Irene Wylie in 1923; they divorced in 1931. In 1932, he married his third and final wife, actress Judith Barrett. They divorced in 1936.

As well as being a lifelong heavy tobacco smoker, Edwards also was an alcoholic, a drug addict and a gambler for much of his career.

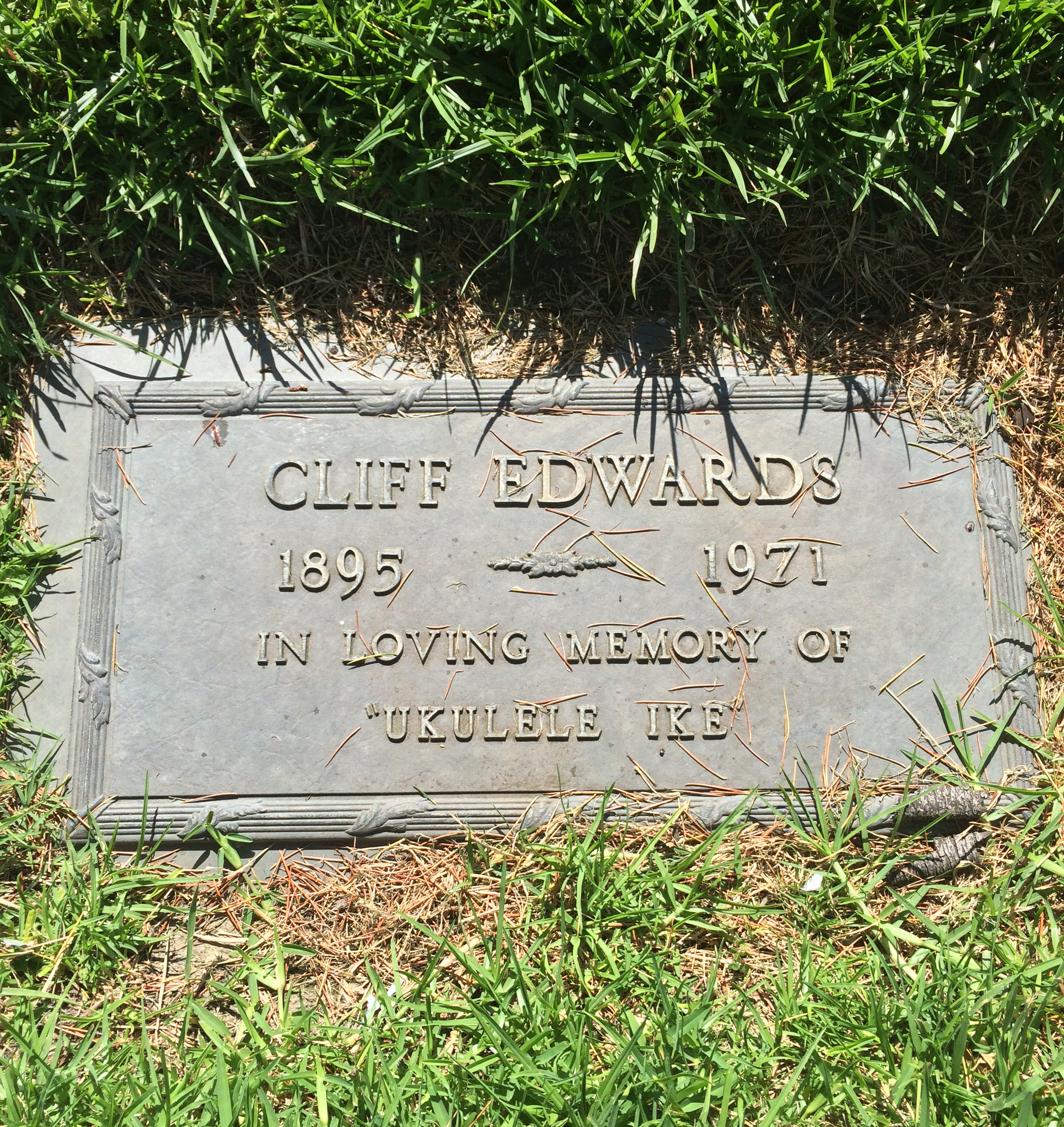
Grave of Cliff Edwards at Valhalla Memorial Park

== Later years and death ==
In his final years, Edwards lived in a home for indigent actors and often spent his time loitering at the Walt Disney Studios to be available any time he could get voice work. He was sometimes taken to lunch by animators whom he befriended and told stories of his days in vaudeville.

Edwards died on July 17, 1971, at the age of 76 from a cardiac arrest brought on by arteriosclerosis. At the time of his death, Edwards was a penniless charity patient at the Virgil Convalescent Hospital in Hollywood, California. His body was unclaimed and was donated to the University of California, Los Angeles medical school. When Walt Disney Productions, which had been quietly paying many of his medical expenses, discovered this, they offered to purchase his remains and pay for the burial. Instead, it was done by the Actors' Fund of America (which had also aided Edwards) and the Motion Picture and Television Relief Fund. Disney paid for his grave marker.

== Honors ==
In 2000, Edwards was awarded as a Disney Legend for voice-acting. In 2002, Edwards' 1940 recording on Victor, Victor 26477, "When You Wish Upon a Star", was inducted into the Grammy Hall of Fame.

== Compilation Discography ==
- Ukulele Ike Sings Again (Disneyland, 1956)
- A Day at Disneyland with Walt Disney and Jiminy Cricket (Disneyland, 1957)
- The Story of Walt Disney's Cinderella (Disneyland, 1957)
- Songs, Games & Fun (RCA Victor, 1958)
- I'm a Bear in a Lady's Boudoir (Yazoo, 1975)
- Ukulele Ike (Glendale, 1978)
- Cliff Edwards and His Hot Combination 1925–1926 (Retrieval, 1978)
- The Vintage Recordings of Cliff Edwards (Ukulele Ike) (Take Two, 1979)
- The Musical Score of The Wizard of Oz/The Song Hits from Walt Disney's Pinocchio (MCA, 1980)
- Ukulele Ike 1930's Radio Transcriptions: Live June 1947 (Collectors' Choice, 1996)
- I Did it With My Little Ukulele (Upbeat Jazz, 2013)

== Partial filmography ==
- Marianne (1929) as Soapy
- So This Is College (1929) as Windy
- The Hollywood Revue of 1929 (1929) as Himself
- They Learned About Women (1930) as Singer in Harlem Madness number (uncredited)
- Lord Byron of Broadway (1930) as Joe
- Crazy House (1930, Short) as Writer
- Doughboys (1930) as Nescopeck
- Montana Moon (1930) as Froggy
- Children of Pleasure (1930) as Cliff - Radio Performer (uncredited)
- Way Out West (1930) as Trilby
- Good News (1930) as Kearney
- Those Three French Girls (1930) as Owly
- Remote Control (1930) as Hog Caller (uncredited)
- Dance, Fools, Dance (1931) as Bert Scranton
- The Prodigal (1931) as Snipe, a Tramp
- Parlor, Bedroom and Bath (1931) as Bell Hop
- Stepping Out (1931) as Paul Perkins
- Shipmates (1931) as Bilge
- Laughing Sinners (1931) as Mike
- The Great Lover (1931) as Finny
- Sidewalks of New York (1931) as Poggle
- The Sin of Madelon Claudet (1931) as Victor Lebeau
- Hell Divers (1931) as "Baldy"
- Young Bride (1932) as Pete
- Fast Life (1932) as Bumpy
- Flying Devils (1933) as 'Screwy' Edwards
- Take a Chance (1933) as Louie Webb
- George White's Scandals (1934) as Stew Hart
- George White's 1935 Scandals (1935) as Dude
- Red Salute (1935) as P.J. Rooney
- The Man I Marry (1936) as Jerry Ridgeway
- They Gave Him a Gun (1937) as Laro
- Between Two Women (1937) as Snoopy
- Saratoga (1937) as Tip
- Bad Guy (1937) as 'Hi-Line'
- The Women Men Marry (1937) as Jerry Little
- The Bad Man of Brimstone (1937) as 'Buzz' McCreedy
- Big City (1937)
- The Girl of the Golden West (1938) as Minstrel Joe
- The Little Adventuress (1938) as Handy
- Maisie (1939) as 'Shorty' Miller
- Smuggled Cargo (1939) as Professor
- Gone with the Wind (1939) as Reminiscent Soldier
- His Girl Friday (1940) as Reporter Endicott
- High School (1940) as Jeff Jefferson
- Pinocchio (1940) as Jiminy Cricket (voice, uncredited)
- Millionaires in Prison (1940) as Happy
- Flowing Gold (1940) as 'Hot Rocks' Harris
- Cliff Edwards and His Buckaroos (1940) as "Mr. Cliff" (Western short)
- Friendly Neighbors (1940) as Notes
- She Couldn't Say No (1940) as Banjo Page
- The Monster and the Girl (1941) as Leon Beecher 'Tips' Stokes
- Knockout (1941) as Pinky (credits) / Sleepy
- Power Dive (1941) as Squid Watkins
- International Squadron (1941) as Omaha McGrath
- Dumbo (1941) as Dandy Crow (voice, uncredited)
- West of Tombstone (1942) as Harmony Haines
- Sundown Jim (1942) as Stable proprietor
- Bandit Ranger (1942) as Ike
- Red River Robin Hood (1942) as Ike
- Seven Miles from Alcatraz (1942) as Stormy
- Pirates of the Prairie (1942) as Ike
- American Empire (1942) as Runty
- Der Fuehrer's Face (1943) as Nazi lead singer
- Fighting Frontier (1943) as Ike
- Salute for Three (1943) as Foggy
- The Falcon Strikes Back (1943) as Goldie Locke
- Sagebrush Law (1943) as Ike
- The Avenging Rider (1943) as Ike
- Fun and Fancy Free (1947) as Jiminy Cricket (voice)
- Bat Masterson (1959) as AJ Mulvaney - Town Undertaker
- Platinum High School (1960) as Frank (uncredited)
- The Man from Button Willow (1965) as Doc / The Whip (voice, uncredited)
- That's Entertainment! (1974) as himself in clip from The Hollywood Revue of 1929
- Once Upon a Studio (2023) as Jiminy Cricket (voice, archive audio)
