= Thelma Strabel =

American writer

Thelma L. Strabel (19 December 1900 – 28 May 1959) was an American novelist who specialized in tales of the American South and sea adventures. She is best known for her novel Reap the Wild Wind, which was serialized in the Saturday Evening Post and became a successful film.

== Biography ==
Strabel was born in Crown Point, Indiana on December 19, 1900, the first child of grocer John George Strabel and his wife Nannsie. (For unknown reasons, Strabel later claimed Pennsylvania as her birthplace.) She was the great-granddaughter of Abraham Lincoln's private secretary, General John Hall. She grew up in Champaign-Urbana, Illinois, but spent much of her youth also in southwestern Pennsylvania, her mother's native district.

Strabel published her first short story in the children's section of a Pittsburgh newspaper. At 16, she worked as a census enumerator for the local census board. She graduated from the University of Illinois and later became a fashion reporter in Paris and an advertising copywriter for the Abraham & Straus department store. While convalescing from an illness in Switzerland, she began to write fiction as a vocation. Among her early works are Smart Woman (1933), Streamline Marriage (1937), For Richer -- Or For Poorer? (1938), and You Can't Escape Forever (1938). She wrote several novels set in exotic locales ranging from Caribbean islands to the jungles of Peru.

Her best known story, Reap the Wild Wind (1940), is a romantic saga of the wreckers in and around Key West, Florida. Producer-director Cecil B. DeMille bought the novel and, with numerous alterations, produced a popular movie version starring Paulette Goddard and John Wayne in 1942. Strabel was so enamored of Key West and its unique history that she built a house there following the sale of the story to The Saturday Evening Post in 1940. The house, located at 400 South Street, was described by Strabel, not without argument, as the southernmost house in the United States. It remained a popular site for visitors to the island until its demolition and replacement by a larger house.

Strabel's later novels and stories include Storm to the South (1944), a romance of Bolivarian Peru, You Were There (a Woman's Home Companion serialized novel, filmed as Undercurrent [1946]), and Caribee (1957), a romantic novel revolving around the Mount Pelée volcanic disaster of 1902.

== Personal life ==
Strabel married David P. Godwin, who was the chief of fire control for the U.S. Forest Service, an agency which served as the subject of her short story The Forest Ranger (also filmed in 1942, as The Forest Rangers). Godwin was killed in a plane crash June 13, 1947, and Strabel never remarried.

Strabel died of cancer on May 28, 1959, in Washington DC. She was buried in Charleston, South Carolina.
