= Reap the Wild Wind =

1942 adventure color film made in USA

- Poster reversing Wayne and Milland's billing
- Directed by: Cecil B. DeMille
- Screenplay by: Charles Bennett; Jesse Lasky, Jr. Alan Le May; Jeanie MacPherson; Henry Marshall
- Based on: Reap the Wild Wind by Thelma Strabel
- Produced by: Cecil B. DeMille
- Starring: John Wayne; Ray Milland; Paulette Goddard; Raymond Massey; Lynne Overman; Robert Preston; Susan Hayward; Charles Bickford; Walter Hampden; Martha O'Driscoll; Janet Beecher
- Cinematography: Victor Milner; William Skall
- Edited by: Anne Bauchens
- Music by: Victor Young
- Color process: Technicolor
- Production company: Paramount Pictures
- Distributed by: Paramount Pictures
- Release date: March 18, 1942
- Running time: 123 minutes
- Country: United States
- Language: English
- Box office: $4 million (US/ Canada rentals)

Reap the Wild Wind is a 1942 American adventure film produced and directed by Cecil B. DeMille and starring Ray Milland, John Wayne, and Paulette Goddard, with a supporting cast featuring Raymond Massey, Robert Preston, Lynne Overman, Susan Hayward and Charles Bickford. DeMille's second Technicolor production, the film is based on a serialized story written by Thelma Strabel in 1940 for The Saturday Evening Post. The screenplay was written by Alan Le May (author of the novel The Searchers), Charles Bennett, Jesse Lasky, Jr. and Jeanie MacPherson.

While he based his film on Strabel's story, set in the 1840s along the Florida coast, DeMille took liberties with details such as sibling relationships and subplots, while staying true to the spirit of the story, which centers on the headstrong, independent woman portrayed by Goddard.

Released shortly after the United States' entry into World War II, Reap the Wild Wind was wildly successful at the box office and earned three Academy Award nominations, winning for Best Special Effects.

== Plot ==
In 1840, Loxi Claiborne is running a marine salvage business started by her deceased father. A hurricane is passing through the Key West area, leaving behind at least one wreck on the nearby shoals. The Jubilee founders, and Loxi and other salvagers race to claim the cargo. Not arriving first, Loxi and her crew rescue the captain, Jack Stuart, but do not share in the salvage rights. Apparently, the first salvager on the scene, King Cutler, may have actually planned the wreck.

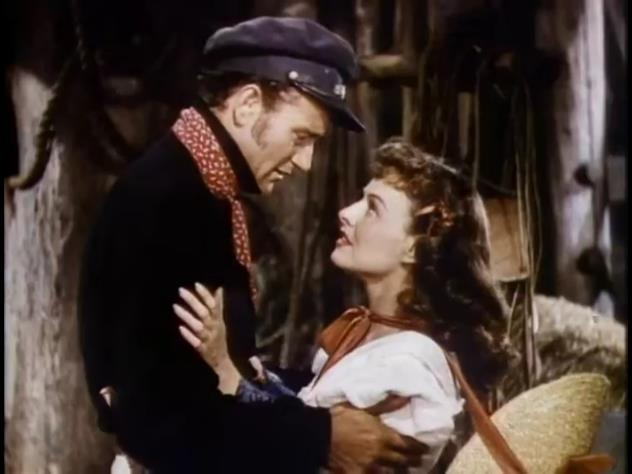
John Wayne and Paulette Goddard

Nursing Jack back to health, Loxi falls in love with him. When she visits Charleston with her cousin Drusilla, Loxi schemes to win a plum captain's position for Jack by seducing Steve Tolliver, who is running the sailing ship line for which Jack works. Steve falls for Loxi and returns with her to Key West to investigate the truth about Jack's shipwreck.

Drusilla goes home to Havana when Loxi and Steve return to Key West. Steve has come to rid the Keys of pirates like Cutler (and to be near Loxi). Cutler, in turn, arranges to have Steve shanghaied by the crew of a whaler. Loxi hears of the plot and gets Jack to help her save Steve. Later, they discover that Steve has concealed Jack's appointment to the steamship Southern Cross on orders from his superior. Angry over a seemingly underhanded act, Jack meets with Cutler. He learns that Steve's boss has just died and that Steve will be taking over the shipping line. Jack realizes that he is unlikely to keep his command with Steve in charge and agrees to work with Cutler to sabotage his new ship; he sails to Havana to take command.

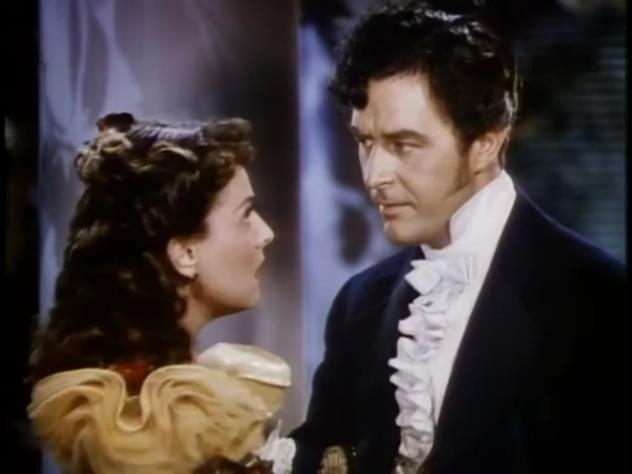
Paulette Goddard and Ray Milland

Rumors circulate and prices of the cargo of the Southern Cross fluctuate wildly, leaving Steve to suspect a wreck is planned. He commandeers the Claiborne with Loxi on board and heads to Havana to stop Jack. Loxi, believing Jack is innocent, disables her ship, and they sit becalmed in a fog bank as the Southern Cross piles into a reef and sinks. Unknown to Jack, Drusilla had stowed away to be with her lover, King Cutler's brother Dan, and she drowns.

Jack is put on trial for wrecking his ship. The testimony reveals a woman may have been on board, though none was rescued. To determine if a woman is in the wreck, Steve agrees to dive to the wreck with Jack. While down in the wreck, Jack and Steve discover proof that Drusilla was on board and has been drowned. They are attacked by a giant squid. Jack saves Steve's life, but is lost when the Southern Cross slips off the continental shelf into deep water. Dan Cutler accuses his brother of murder and is shot dead by him, whereupon, Steve shoots King Cutler, killing him.

Loxi and Steve return to Charleston together.

== Cast ==
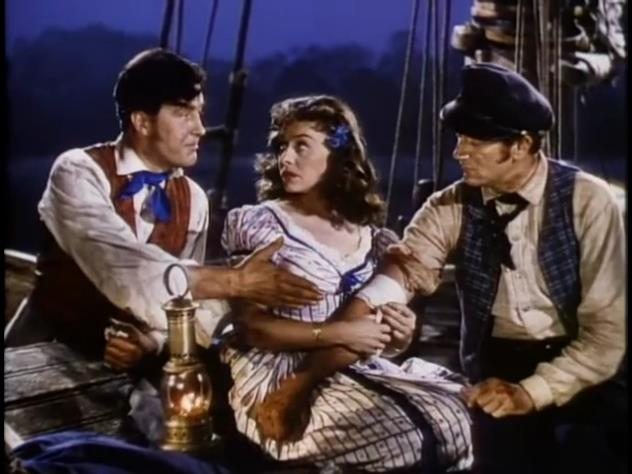
Ray Milland, Paulette Goddard, and John Wayne

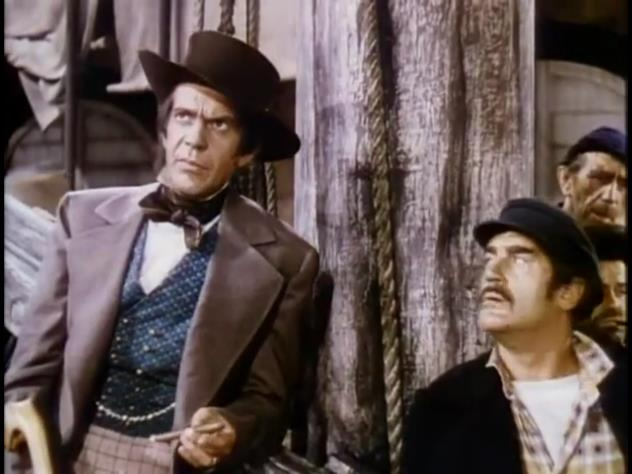
Raymond Massey (left)

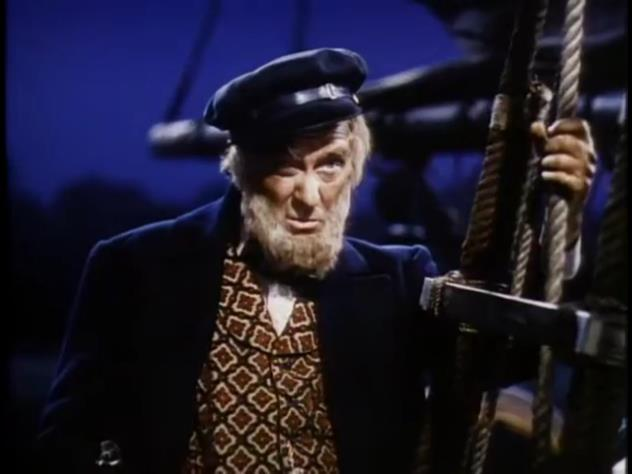
Lynne Overman

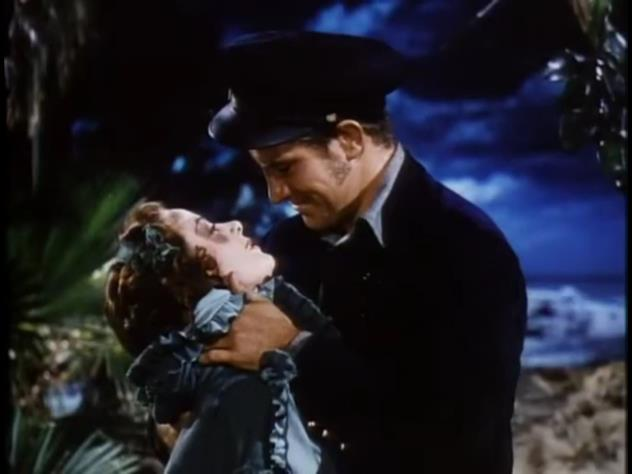
Susan Hayward and Robert Preston

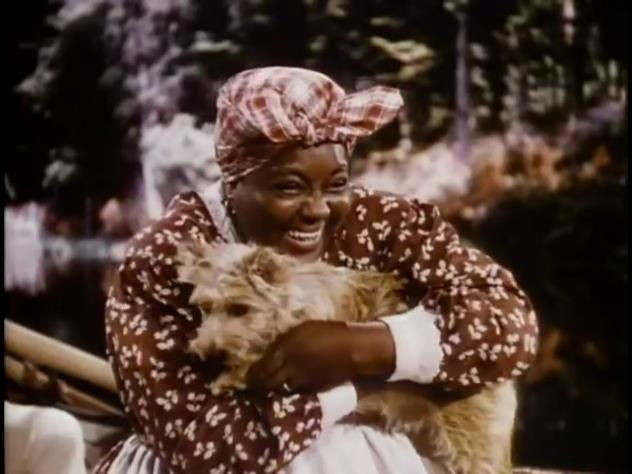
Louise Beavers

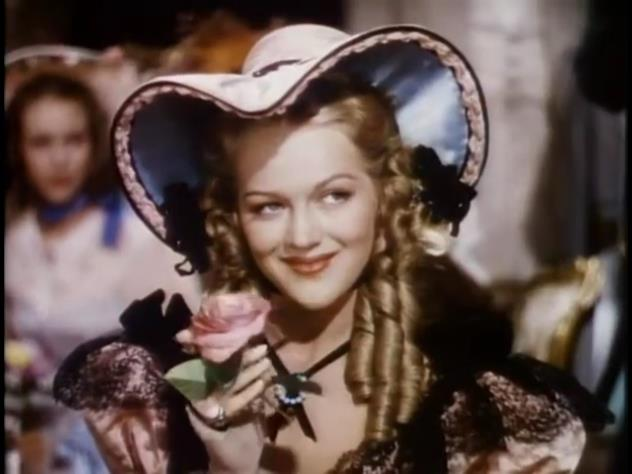
Martha O'Driscoll

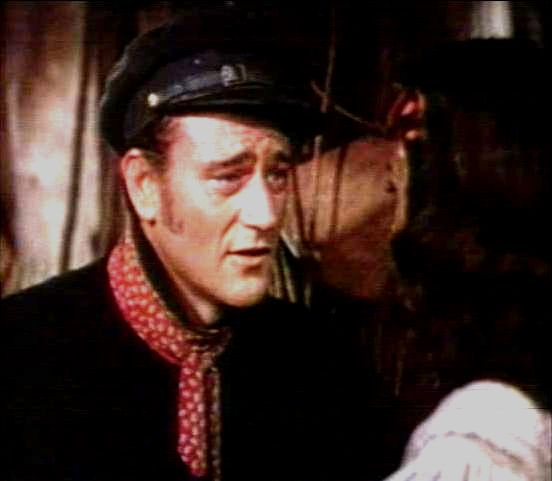
John Wayne

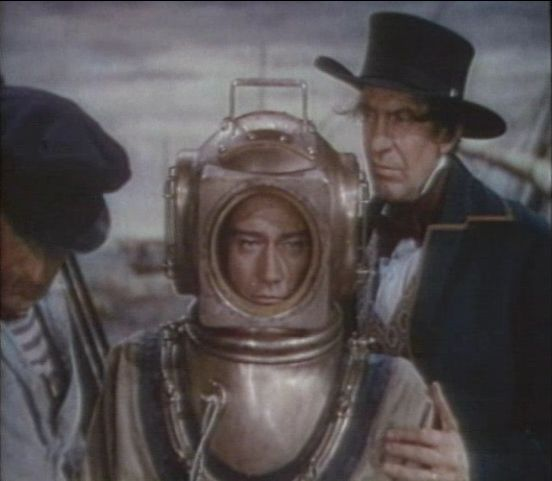
Jack (John Wayne) prepares to dive

- Ray Milland as Steven Tolliver
- John Wayne as Jack Stuart
- Paulette Goddard as Loxi Claiborne
- Raymond Massey as King Cutler
- Robert Preston as Dan Cutler
- Lynne Overman as Captain Philpott
- Susan Hayward as Drusilla Alston
- Milburn Stone as Lieutenant Farragut
- Charles Bickford as Bully Brown
- Walter Hampden as Commodore Devereaux
- Louise Beavers as Maum Maria, the Claiborne Maid
- Martha O'Driscoll as Ivy Devereaux
- Elisabeth Risdon as Mrs. Claiborne
- Hedda Hopper as Aunt Henrietta Beresford
- Victor Kilian as Mathias Widgeon
- Oscar Polk as Salt Meat
- Raymond Hatton as Master Shipwright
- Lane Chandler as Sam
- William "Wee Willie" Davis as The Lamb
- Ben Carter as Chinkapin
- Janet Beecher as Mrs. Mottram
- Dave Wengren as 'Claiborne' Lookout
- Davison Clark as Judge Marvin
- Louis Merrill as Captain of the 'Pelican'
- Frank M. Thomas as Dr. Jepson
- Victor Varconi as Lubbock
- Sue Thomas as Belle at Ball
- James Dime as a spongeboat crewman
- Cecil B. DeMille as Narrator (uncredited)

== Production ==
The film is unusual among films starring John Wayne since it is one of relatively few films in which he plays a character with a notable dark side, as well as accepting second billing under Milland. Wayne subsequently starred in a 1948 seafaring adventure titled Wake of the Red Witch which had numerous similarities to Reap the Wild Wind, including Wayne's portrayal of an even darker character.

This film also marks the final appearance by Hedda Hopper as an actress in a significant role. The gossip columnist would, however, make cameo appearances in subsequent films.

Los Angeles architect William Pereira designed special effects for this film. Pereira, newly arrived from Chicago, had a brief stint as a Hollywood set designer and engineer prior to becoming a professor at the University of Southern California and later co-founding the architecture firm of Pereira & Luckman.

== Awards and nominations ==
| Award | Category | Recipient(s) | Result |
|---|---|---|---|
| Academy Award | Best Art Direction | Hans Dreier, Roland Anderson, George Sawley | Nominated |
| Academy Award | Best Cinematography | Victor Milner, William V. Skall | Nominated |
| Academy Award | Best Special Effects | Farciot Edouart, Gordon Jennings, William Pereira, Louis Mesenkop | Won |
| Film Daily Filmdom's Famous Five Award | Top Five Directors | Cecil B. DeMille | 3rd place |
| Film Daily Filmdom's Famous Five Award | Top Five Cameramen | Victor Milner | 3rd place |

== See also ==
- John Wayne filmography
