= The Phantom (1961 film) =

1961 American TV film

The Phantom is a 1961 American TV film. It was a pilot for a proposed TV series based on the comic strip The Phantom. It is widely believed that the pilot never aired, but decades after it was filmed, it leaked onto the internet.

The project was developed in 1956 with Roger Creed, a former stuntman, to play the Phantom.

The title of the pilot episode is "No Escape". It has been criticized as having an incoherent script which fails to provide important backstory and motivation for the characters or explanation for the settings.

== Plot ==
The Phantom goes to a plantation owned by Mrs. Harris to find out who is killing various workers.

== Cast ==
- Roger Creed as The Phantom / Mr. Walker
- Paulette Goddard as Mrs. Harris
- Lon Chaney Jr. as Jed
- Reginald Denny as Commissioner R.G. Mallory
- Allan Nixon as Doc Sanders
- Chaino
- Marc Davis as Hardy
- Richard Kiel as Big Mike

== Production ==
The production of The Phantom was overseen by Al Brodax and Bob Duncan, with Phantom rights-holders King Features directly handling the project. Harold Daniels directed the pilot episode. Writer John Carr originally wrote four episodes, but because the pilot was not picked up by a network, the remaining three were never filmed. Actress Marilyn Manning had originally been cast as Diana Palmer, but never appeared in the pilot. Devil, Hero, and the Jungle Patrol all appear throughout the course of the story.
