= William V. Skall =

American cinematographer

- Born: October 5, 1897
- Died: March 22, 1976 (aged 78)
- Occupation: Cinematographer

William V. Skall (October 5, 1897 in Chicago – March 22, 1976 in Los Angeles) was an American cinematographer who specialized in Technicolor.

== Life ==
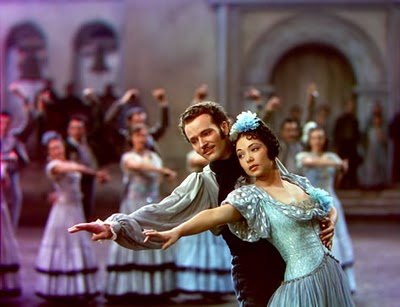
Charles Collins and Steffi Duna in Dancing Pirate (1936)

He began his film career straight after leaving school and worked for two years in camera crews before becoming a chief cameraman for the first time in 1936, with 20th Century Fox. He worked on Quo Vadis (1951) and Rope (1948), the latter for Alfred Hitchcock, with longer scenes than usual in films of that time. He received nine Oscar nominations and won once, sharing Best Cinematography (color) with Joseph Valentine and Winton Hoch in 1949 for Joan of Arc.

== Partial filmography ==
- Dancing Pirate (1936)
- Victoria the Great (1937)
- The Little Princess (1939)
- Billy the Kid (1941)
- Reap the Wild Wind (1942)
- To the Shores of Tripoli (1942)
- The Forest Rangers (1942)
- Night and Day (1946)
- The Time, the Place and the Girl (1946)
- Rope (film) (1948)
- Joan of Arc (1948)
- Kim (1950)
- Quo Vadis (1951)
- Brave Warrior (1952)
