= Undercurrent (1946 film) =

1946 film directed by Vincente Minnelli

- Theatrical film poster
- Directed by: Vincente Minnelli
- Screenplay by: Edward Chodorov
- Based on: "You Were There" in Woman's Home Companion magazine (1944-45) by Thelma Strabel
- Produced by: Pandro S. Berman
- Starring: Katharine Hepburn; Robert Taylor; Robert Mitchum
- Cinematography: Karl Freund
- Edited by: Ferris Webster
- Music by: Herbert Stothart; Mario Castelnuovo-Tedesco
- Production company: Metro-Goldwyn-Mayer
- Distributed by: Loew's Inc.
- Release date: November 28, 1946 (NYC)
- Running time: 114 or 116 minutes
- Country: United States
- Language: English
- Budget: $1,644,000
- Box office: $4,327,000

Undercurrent is a 1946 American film noir drama directed by Vincente Minnelli and starring Katharine Hepburn, Robert Taylor, and Robert Mitchum. The screenplay was written by Edward Chodorov, based on the story "You Were There'" by Thelma Strabel, and allegedly contained uncredited contributions from Marguerite Roberts.

== Plot ==
Ann Hamilton, a young woman from a middle-class family, meets wealthy businessman Alan Garroway when he comes to visit her scientist father. Ann and Alan soon fall in love and get married.

In the days following their marriage, Ann meets Alan's high society friends, including Sylvia Martin with whom Alan had a relationship. Mrs. Foster, Alan's neighbor, mentions Alan's brother Michael. When Ann asks him about Michael, Alan tells her they became estranged and lost contact. Ann gradually discovers evidence of Michael's character contrary to Alan's description; rather than a party animal and a thief, Michael was a quiet and thoughtful man with an appreciation of art. One of Michael's former friends convinces Ann that Alan murdered Michael.

Ann visits Michael's former ranch house in California. She encounters Michael, who pretends to be a groundskeeper. They go on a romantic walk through the woods.

Alan follows Ann to the ranch and becomes agitated with her prying behavior. They return to his family home in Virginia. Michael follows them. He confronts Alan privately, and accuses him of murdering the original inventor of the device that made Alan his fortune. Michael promises to keep quiet as long as Alan tells Ann the truth. Ann finds one of Michael's lit cigarettes, and she realizes he is still alive.

The following morning, Ann confesses to Alan that she thought he killed Michael, and that she would have left Alan if he was a murderer. She admits she has become obsessed with Michael. Alan enters a jealous rage, and decides to keep Ann trapped and isolated in their Virginia mansion. Mrs. Foster, unsuspecting, visits on horseback and suggests that Ann and Alan go on a ride with her. Alan mounts a large and unruly horse. The three of them ride through the forest, but Alan manages to separate Ann from Mrs. Foster. Alan attempts to kill Ann, who falls off her horse. After Alan dismounts to finish her off, his wild horse rears up and fatally kicks him in the head.

Weeks later, Ann is recovering from her injuries in the mansion, having inherited Alan's estate. She invites Michael to visit, and the two begin a budding romance.

== Cast ==
- Katharine Hepburn as Ann Hamilton
- Robert Taylor as Alan Garroway
- Robert Mitchum as Michael Garroway
- Edmund Gwenn as Professor David "Dink" Hamilton
- Marjorie Main as Lucy
- Jayne Meadows as Sylvia Lea Burton
- Clinton Sundberg as Mr. Warmsley
- Dan Tobin as Professor Joseph Bangs
- Kathryn Card as Mrs. Foster
- Leigh Whipper as George
- Charles Trowbridge as Justice Putnam
- James Westerfield as Henry Gilson
- Billy McClain as Uncle Ben
- Milton Kibbee as Minister
- Jean Andren as Mrs. Davenport
- Forbes Murray as Senator Edwards
- Gordon Richards as Headwaiter

Cast notes

- Undercurrent marked Robert Taylor's screen return after spending three years in the Navy.
- Jayne Meadows made her film debut in this film.
- "Rommy", the dog, was trained by Hollywood's most prestigious dog trainers, the Rudd Weatherwax family.

== Production ==
Undercurrent was only director Vincente Minnelli's second dramatic film, the first being The Clock, which starred his wife at the time, Judy Garland. Minnelli's specialty was in directing the kind of glossy musicals that M-G-M's Arthur Freed unit turned out. Because he trusted producer Pandro S. Berman's judgement in regard to the film's star, Katharine Hepburn – who had already signed on to do the film – Minnelli accepted the assignment; Berman had produced Alice Adams and Stage Door with Hepburn when they both worked for RKO Pictures. Berman and Minnelli would go on to make Madame Bovary (1949), Father of the Bride (1950), and other successful films together.

Metro-Goldwyn-Mayer paid David O. Selznick $25,000 and RKO $75,000 for the use of Robert Mitchum. Mitchum was working on two other films at the same time, Desire Me (1947) and The Locket (1946), which prompted director Vincente Minnelli to wonder if that was how Mitchum maintained his sleepy-eyed look.

Hepburn was opinionated about her colleagues. She wasn't impressed by Mitchum, an opinion she did not hide, and, at least at first, was not happy about Minnelli being the director of the film. Hepburn's self-assurance made Minnelli nervous, but the two grew to be good friends, a fact which annoyed Robert Taylor, who was afraid that the film would become a showcase for Hepburn. He changed his mind, though, after realizing that Minnelli's direction was helping to improve his performance.

The musical motif featured in the film is an excerpt from Johannes Brahms' Symphony No. 3.

== Reception ==
=== Critical response ===
Variety magazine lauded the film and wrote, "Undercurrent is heavy drama with femme appeal...Hepburn sells her role with usual finesse and talent. Robert Mitchum, as the missing brother, has only three scenes, but makes them count for importance."

Critic Bosley Crowther of The New York Times also liked the film and wrote, "However, that is Undercurrent-—and you must take it upon its own terms, which are those of theatrical dogmatism, if you hope to endure it at all. If you do, you may find it gratifying principally because Miss Hepburn gives a crisp and taut performance of a lady overcome by mounting fears and Mr. Taylor, back in films from his war service, accelerates a brooding meanness as her spouse. You may also find Robert Mitchum fairly appealing in a crumpled, modest way as the culturally oriented brother, even though he appears in only a couple of scenes. And you may like Edmund Gwenn and Jayne Meadows, among others, in minor roles."

More recently, critic Dennis Schwartz wrote, "Director Vincente Minnelli...known mostly through his upbeat MGM musicals, changes direction with this tearjerker femme appealing romantic melodrama, that can also be viewed as a heavy going psychological film noir (at least, stylishly noir through the brilliantly dark photography of Karl Freund)...Though overlong and filled with too many misleading clues about which brother is the baddie, the acting is superb, even though both Katharine Hepburn and Robert Mitchum are cast against type (a weak woman and a sensitive man). It successfully takes on the theme from Gaslight."

=== Box office ===
The film was popular at the box office; according to MGM records, it earned $2,828,000 in the US and Canada and $1,409,000 elsewhere, resulting in a profit of $1,001,000. Variety said it grossed $3.25 million in 1946.

== Adaptations ==
Lux Radio Theatre aired a one-hour radio adaptation of the film on October 6, 1947, with Katharine Hepburn and Robert Taylor reprising their roles. It aired a second adaptation on November 30, 1953, this time with Joan Fontaine and Mel Ferrer in the lead roles.

== See also ==
- Gothic romance film
