= The Crystal Ball (film) =

1943 film by Elliott Nugent

- Theatrical release poster
- Directed by: Elliott Nugent
- Screenplay by: Virginia Van Upp
- Story by: Steven Vas
- Produced by: Buddy G. DeSylva
- Starring: Ray Milland; Paulette Goddard; Gladys George
- Cinematography: Leo Tover
- Edited by: Doane Harrison
- Music by: Victor Young
- Production companies: Paramount Pictures; Cinema Guild Productions
- Distributed by: United Artists
- Release date: January 22, 1943
- Running time: 81 minutes
- Country: United States
- Language: English
- Box office: $1 million (US rentals)

The Crystal Ball is a 1943 film directed by Elliott Nugent and starring Ray Milland and Paulette Goddard.

== Plot ==
A maid, in cahoots with Madame Zenobia, a fake psychic, fools Jo Ainsly into believing Zenobia to be a gifted fortune teller.

Madame Zenobia helps a young beauty queen, Toni Gerard, find a job with Pop Tibbots in an arcade. Toni ends up conspiring with Madame Zenobia to fool Jo's handsome attorney, Brad Cavanaugh, into buying a piece of land.

The plan backfires when the land purchase gets Brad in trouble with the government. Toni, who has fallen for Brad, tries to persuade Zenobia to reveal her deceit, but Zenobia locks her in a closet and flees. Toni has to convince Brad that her love for him is real.

== Cast ==
- Ray Milland as Brad Cavanaugh
- Paulette Goddard as Toni Gerard
- Gladys George as Madame Zenobia
- Virginia Field as Jo Ainsly
- Cecil Kellaway as Pop Tibbots
- William Bendix as Biff Carter

== See also ==
- List of American films of 1943
