= Julie Gilbert =

Writer

Julie Gilbert (born July 21, 1946 ) is an American writer.

== Life ==
Gilbert was born in New York City. Her father, Henry Goldsmith, was a publisher, and her mother, Janet Fox, was an actress. Her great aunt was Edna Ferber.

She attended Boston University and worked as a professional actress, writer and teacher. She leads a Writers' Academy in Palm Beach.

She has written biographies, novels and plays, including Umbrella Steps (adapted into film) and Ferber: The Biography of Edna Ferber and Her Circle, which was nominated for the National Book Critics Circle Award. She received a Pulitzer Prize nomination for Opposite Attraction: The Lives of Erich Maria Remarque and Paulette Goddard.

Her papers are held at New York University.

== Works ==
- Gilbert, Julie Goldsmith (1972-01-01). Umbrella Steps. ISBN 978-0-394-47945-3.
- Gilbert, Julie Goldsmith (1995). Opposite Attraction. New York, N.Y: Pantheon. ISBN 978-0-679-41535-0.
- Gilbert, Julie Goldsmith (February 2000). Ferber. Hal Leonard Corporation. ISBN 978-1-55783-332-7.
- Gilbert, Julie (2024-12-03). Giant Love. New York: Pantheon. ISBN 978-1-5247-4844-9.
