= King, Queen, Joker =

1921 film

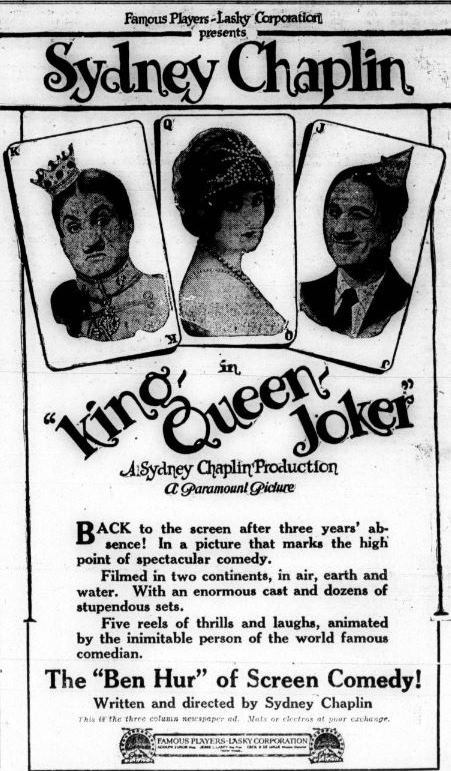
- Advertisement
- Directed by: Sydney Chaplin
- Written by: Sydney Chaplin
- Produced by: Adolph Zukor; Jesse Lasky
- Starring: Sydney Chaplin
- Cinematography: Murphy Darling
- Distributed by: Paramount Pictures
- Release date: May 15, 1921
- Running time: 5 reels; 5,137 feet
- Country: United States
- Languages: Silent; English intertitles

King, Queen, Joker is a 1921 American silent feature farce written and directed by Sydney Chaplin, the elder half-brother of Charlie Chaplin. The picture was produced by Famous Players–Lasky and distributed through Paramount Pictures. The film was shot in England, France, and the United States.

Less than a reel of this film, the barbershop sequence, survives at the British Film Institute. It was included in the 2011 Criterion DVD special two disc edition release of The Great Dictator.

== Plot ==
Based upon a description in a film publication, an imaginary kingdom is in a state of unrest due to the extravagance and oppression of the king, who refuses to sign a people's charter. A humorous barber who resembles the king falls in with some terrorists and agrees to take the king's place after he is kidnapped. The barber then plays the king, and there are several humorous episodes. The real king escapes and the barber is sentenced to be shot, but is saved by the queen and escapes in a bag. The film ends with an automobile chase and a transfer to an airplane.

== Cast ==
- Sydney Chaplin as The King / The Joker
- Lottie MacPherson as The Queen / Chief Plotter

== Censorship ==
Before the film could be exhibited in Kansas, the Kansas Board of Review required the elimination of two scenes. In reel 1, the scene where an old man and girl touch feet, reel 4, three flashes of nude figures.
