= The Forest Rangers (film) =

1942 film by George Marshall

- 1942 Theatrical Poster
- Directed by: George Marshall
- Screenplay by: Harold Shumate
- Story by: Thelma Strabel
- Produced by: Robert Sisk
- Starring: Fred MacMurray; Paulette Goddard; Susan Hayward
- Cinematography: Charles Lang; William V. Skall
- Edited by: Paul Weatherwax
- Music by: Victor Young
- Production company: Paramount Pictures
- Distributed by: Paramount Pictures
- Release date: October 21, 1942
- Running time: 87 minutes
- Country: United States
- Language: English
- Box office: $1.5 million (US rentals)

The Forest Rangers is a 1942 American adventure film made by Paramount Pictures, directed by George Marshall, written by Harold Shumate based on a story by Thelma Strabel, and starring Fred MacMurray, Paulette Goddard, and Susan Hayward. The film was notable for introducing the song "Jingle Jangle Jingle" which became a huge hit for Kay Kyser.

== Plot ==
When a fire breaks out, forest ranger Don Stuart gets help from men who work for mill owner Tana Mason, a woman he fondly calls "Butch." In the air helping is pilot Frank Hatfield, whose love for Tana is not mutual. Everyone assumes that Tana and Don will end up together.

Once the blaze is out, Don concludes that arson was involved. Twig Dawson, a lumber man with grievances against Tana, is the likely culprit. While the investigation continues, Don attends a parade in town where a firecracker startles a horse carrying Celia Huston, who is thrown. It is love at first sight and Don marries Celia a day later, stunning Tana.

Twig is taken into custody when another fire breaks out. Tana and Celia are trapped together while Don realizes that Twig could not be responsible. He intends to parachute from Frank's plane into the area where the women are stranded, only to discover that Frank is the one who committed the arson. Don is able to narrowly escape and get to Tana and Celia in time.

== Cast ==
- Fred MacMurray as Don Stuart
- Paulette Goddard as Celia Huston Stuart
- Susan Hayward as Tana 'Butch' Mason
- Lynne Overman as Jammer Jones
- Albert Dekker as Twig Dawson
- Eugene Pallette as Howard Huston
- Regis Toomey as Frank Hatfield
- Rod Cameron as Jim Lawrence
- Clem Bevans as Terry McCabe
- James Brown as George Tracy
- Kenneth Griffith as Ranger
- Keith Richards as Ranger
- William Cabanne as Ranger
- Jimmy Conlin as Otto Hanson
- Ed Brady as Keystone Cop (uncredited)
- Byron Foulger as Collector (uncredited)
