= Berth Marks =

1929 film by Lewis R. Foster

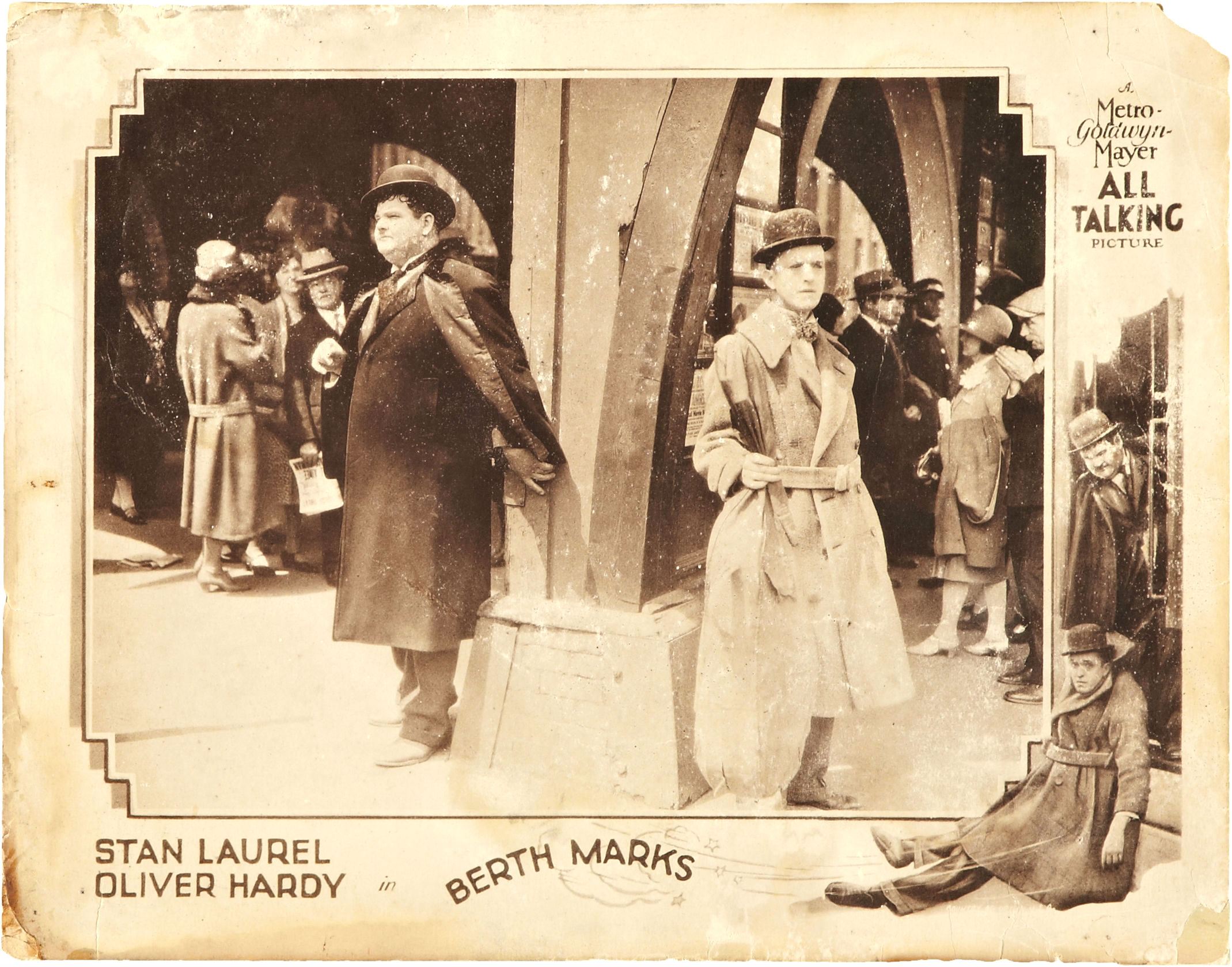
- Lobby card
- Directed by: Lewis R. Foster
- Written by: Leo McCarey; H. M. Walker
- Produced by: Hal Roach
- Starring: Stan Laurel; Oliver Hardy; Pat Harmon; S. D. Wilcox; Eleanor Fredericks; Harry Bernard; Baldwin Cooke; Paulette Goddard; Charlie Hall; Sammy Brooks
- Cinematography: Len Powers
- Edited by: Richard C. Currier
- Music by: Marvin Hatley (1936 reissue)
- Distributed by: Metro-Goldwyn-Mayer; DIC Entertainment (1990 reissue)
- Release date: June 1, 1929
- Running time: 19:28 (English); 49:08 (Spanish)
- Country: United States
- Languages: English; French; Spanish; German; Silent film with English intertitles

Berth Marks (1929) by Lewis R. Foster

Berth Marks is the second sound film starring Laurel and Hardy and was released on June 1, 1929.

== Plot ==
Stan and Ollie, two musicians en route to a performance in Pottsville, Pennsylvania, find themselves travelling onboard a sleeper train. Stan inadvertently drops most of their musical paraphernalia at the station, much to Ollie's alarm, and once on the train the journey is marked by a series of mishaps. Their interactions with fellow passengers compound their troubles, as they unintentionally disturb a diminutive man and startle a woman whilst she is disrobing, when they mistakenly enter a private compartment.

The resulting fracas escalates when the incensed husband of the startled woman accuses an innocent bystander, sparking a cascade of clothing-ripping reprisals among the passengers. Amidst this chaos, Stan and Ollie endeavour to retire to their cramped upper berth, struggling to change into pyjamas. Their efforts are further hampered by the general pandemonium onboard the train.

As they near their destination, Stan and Ollie finally manage to settle into their sleeping quarters, albeit belatedly. However, in their haste to disembark, they leave their main musical instrument behind. Ollie, realizing their oversight, gives chase along the tracks as the train fades into the distance.

== Cast ==
- Stan Laurel as Stan
- Oliver Hardy as Ollie
- Pat Harmon as station master
- S. D. Wilcox as conductor
- Sammy Brooks as short train passenger
- Eleanor Fredericks as lady in berth
- Harry Bernard as passenger
- Baldwin Cooke as passenger
- Paulette Goddard as passenger
- Charlie Hall as passenger

== Production notes ==
Berth Marks was the second sound film starring by Laurel and Hardy. A silent version was also made for cinemas that were not yet wired to show talking pictures. Action and dialogue scripts were written mid-April 1929, with filming taking place between April 20–27.

Several of the train sequences (including some not used in the English release) were utilized for foreign language versions of The Laurel-Hardy Murder Case in 1930. Overall there were three different versions of The Laurel-Hardy Murder Case combined with Berth Marks, released for the foreign language market:-

- Feu mon oncle - French
- Noche de duendes - Spanish
- Spuk um Mitternacht - German

Berth Marks was reissued in 1936 with a music score added to introductory scenes. This version was subsequently included on the 10-disc Laurel & Hardy: The Essential Collection DVD set, as well as the Spanish Noche de duendes. In 2020 both the 1936 soundtrack version and the original 1929 soundtrack version were issued on "Laurel & Hardy - The Definitive Restorations" DVD and Blu-Ray collections.
