= Paulette Goddard =

American actress (1910–1990)

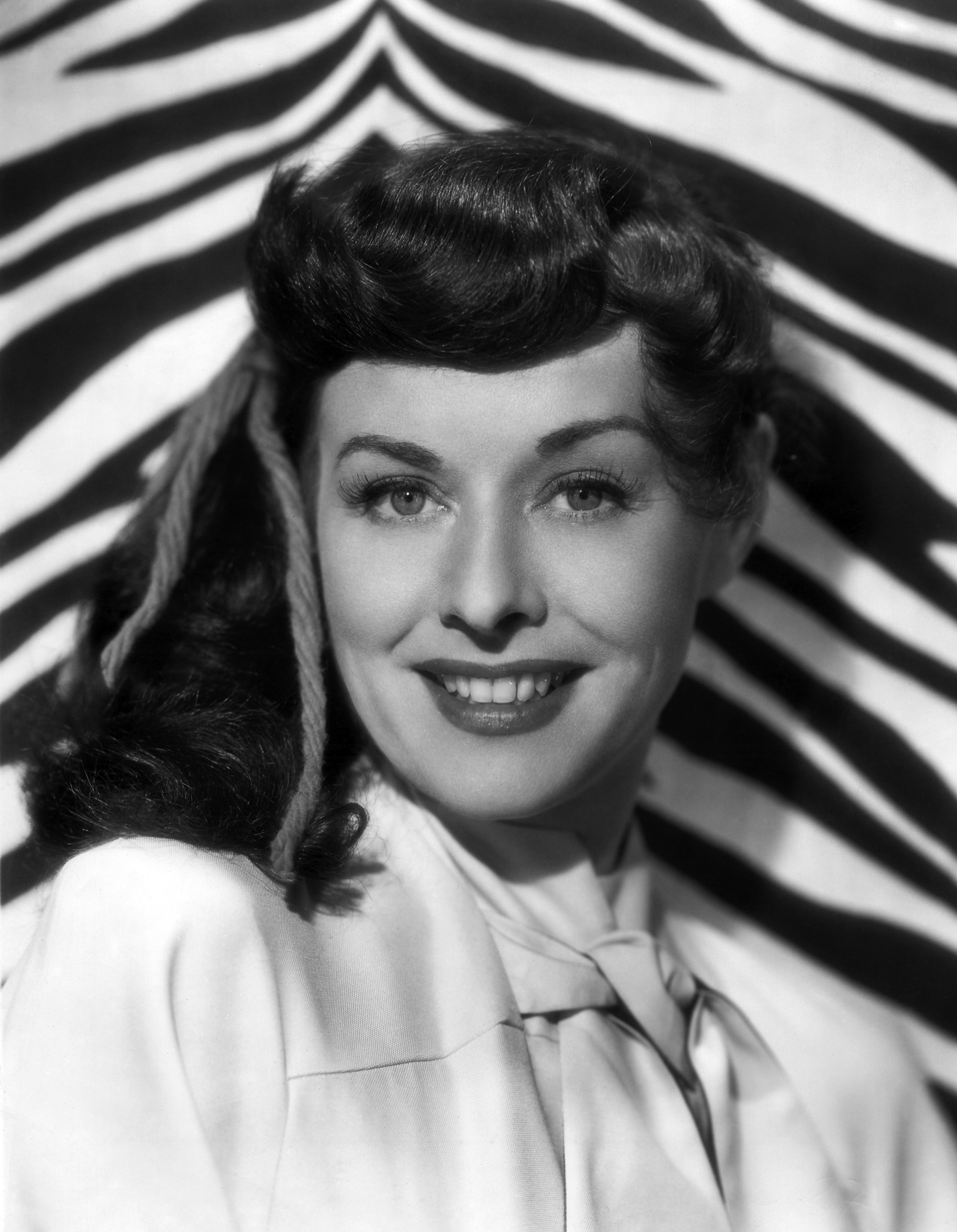
- Goddard in 1947
- Born: Marion Levy (Note: Birth names also cited include: Marion Levy; Pauline Marion Levy; Marion Goddard Levy); June 3, 1910 (Note: There are discrepancies regarding her year of birth. In legal documents and a 1945 interview with Life, Goddard claimed a 1915 birthdate. However, biographer Julie Gilbert gave a 1910 birthdate.); New York City, U.S.
- Died: April 23, 1990 (aged 79); Ronco sopra Ascona, Switzerland
- Occupations: Actress; dancer; model; film producer
- Years active: 1926–1972
- Spouses: Edgar James (m. 1927; div. 1932) Charlie Chaplin (m. 1936; div. 1942) Burgess Meredith (m. 1944; div. 1949) Erich Maria Remarque (m. 1958; died 1970)

Paulette Goddard (born Marion Levy; June 3, 1910 – April 23, 1990) was an American actress and socialite. She was a prominent leading actress during the Golden Age of Hollywood.

Born in New York City and raised in Kansas City, Missouri, Goddard initially began her career as a child fashion model and performer in several Broadway productions as a Ziegfeld Girl. In the early 1930s, she moved to Hollywood and gained notice as the romantic partner of actor and comedian Charlie Chaplin, appearing as his leading lady in Modern Times (1936) and The Great Dictator (1940). After signing with Paramount Pictures, Goddard became one of the studio's biggest stars with roles in The Cat and the Canary (1939) with Bob Hope, The Women (1939) with Norma Shearer and Joan Crawford, North West Mounted Police (1940) with Gary Cooper, Reap the Wild Wind (1942) with John Wayne and Susan Hayward, So Proudly We Hail! (1943), Kitty (1945) with Ray Milland, and Unconquered (1947) with Gary Cooper. She received a nomination for an Academy Award for Best Supporting Actress for her role in So Proudly We Hail! in 1943.

Goddard was noted as a fiercely independent woman for her time, being described by one executive as "dynamite". Her marriages to Chaplin, the actor Burgess Meredith, and the writer Erich Maria Remarque received substantial media attention. Following her marriage to Remarque, Goddard moved to Switzerland and largely retired from acting. In the 1980s, she became a notable socialite. Goddard died in Switzerland in 1990.

== Early life ==
Goddard was born Marion Levy in New York City, the daughter of Joseph Russell Le Vee, who was of Ashkenazi Jewish descent, the son of a prosperous cigar manufacturer from Salt Lake City, and Alta Mae Goddard. Her place of birth is listed in Encyclopædia Britannica at Great Neck, New York. Her parents separated and divorced in 1926. According to Goddard, her father left them, but according to J. R. Le Vee, Alta absconded with the child to avoid a custody battle. She and her mother moved often during her childhood, including relocating to Canada at one point. Goddard did not meet her father again until the late 1930s, after she had become famous. In a 1938 interview published in Collier's, Goddard claimed Le Vee was not her biological father. In response, Le Vee filed a suit against his daughter, claiming that the interview had ruined his reputation and cost him his job, and demanded financial support from her; Goddard admitted her loss in the case in a December 1945 interview with Life, and was forced to pay her father $35 a week. The rift never healed, and when he died in 1954, he left her only $1 in his will.

Goddard began modeling after her parents' separation, working for Saks Fifth Avenue, Hattie Carnegie, and others. An important figure in her childhood was her mother's paternal uncle Charles Goddard, the owner of the American Druggists Syndicate. He played a central role in Goddard's career, introducing her to Broadway impresario Florenz Ziegfeld. In 1926, she made her stage debut as a dancer in Ziegfeld's summer revue, No Foolin' under the stage name Paulette Goddard. Ziegfeld hired her for another musical, Rio Rita, which opened in February 1927, but she left the show after only three weeks to appear in the play The Unconquerable Male, produced by Archie Selwyn. However, it was a flop and closed after only three days following its premiere in Atlantic City. Soon after, Goddard was introduced to Edgar James, president of the Southern Lumber Company, located in Asheville, North Carolina, by Charles Goddard. Aged 17, considerably younger than James, she married him on June 28, 1927, in Rye, New York. It was a short marriage, and they separated in 1929; Goddard was granted a divorce in Reno, Nevada, in 1932, receiving a divorce settlement of $375,000.

== Film career ==
Goddard first visited Hollywood in 1929. She appeared as an uncredited extra in two films, the Laurel and Hardy short film Berth Marks (1929) and George Fitzmaurice's drama The Locked Door (1929). Following her divorce from James, Goddard and her mother briefly visited Europe before returning to Hollywood. Upon her return, Goddard signed her first film contract with producer Samuel Goldwyn to appear as a Goldwyn Girl in Whoopee! (1930). She also appeared in City Streets (1931), Ladies of the Big House (1931), and The Girl Habit (1931) for Paramount, Palmy Days (1931) for Goldwyn, and The Mouthpiece (1932) for Warners. However, Goddard and Goldwyn did not get along, and she also began work for Hal Roach Studios in 1932, appearing in a string of uncredited supporting roles for the next four years.

=== 1932–38: Charlie Chaplin and David Selznick ===
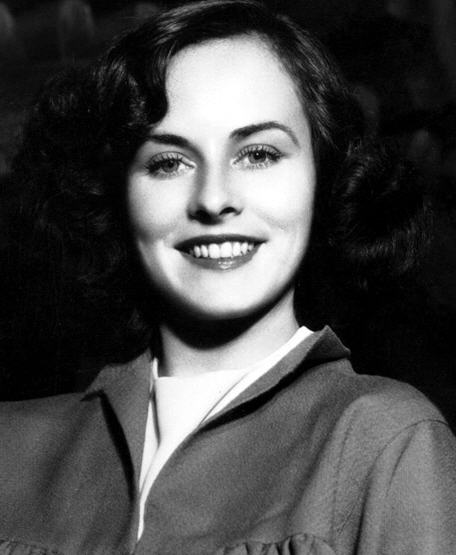
Goddard in a studio publicity still for Modern Times (1936)

The year she signed with Hal Roach, Goddard began dating Charlie Chaplin, a relationship that received substantial attention from the press. Chaplin sent her to local acting teacher Neely Dickson at the Hollywood Community Theater to, in Dickson's words, "give her a polish." It marked a turning point in Goddard's career when Chaplin cast her as his leading lady in his next box office hit, Modern Times (1936). Her role as "The Gamin," an orphan girl who runs away from the authorities and becomes The Tramp's companion, was her first credited film appearance and garnered her mainly positive reviews, Frank S. Nugent of The New York Times describing her as "the fitting recipient of the great Charlot's championship".

Following the success of Modern Times, Chaplin planned other projects with Goddard in mind as a co-star. However, Chaplin worked on his projects slowly, and Goddard worried that the public might forget about her if she did not continue to make regular film appearances. She signed a contract with David O. Selznick and appeared with Janet Gaynor in the comedy The Young in Heart (1938). Selznick, who was pleased with Goddard's performance in the film, strongly considered her for the role of Scarlett O'Hara in Gone With the Wind. Initial screen tests convinced Selznick and director George Cukor that Goddard would require coaching to be effective in the role, but that she showed the most promise. By December 1938, Selznick had narrowed the choices to Goddard and Vivien Leigh, who won the role after the two completed the only Technicolor screen tests for the role.

Goddard's losing out on the role was attributable to several factors. Notably, the head of Selznick's publicity department Russell Birdwell had strong misgivings about Goddard, writing in reference to her strong personality, "Briefly, I think she is dynamite that will explode in our very faces if she is given the part." Chaplin's biographer Joyce Milton wrote that Selznick also worried about legal issues by signing Goddard to a contract that might conflict with her pre-existing contracts with the Chaplin studio. While, at the time of the casting, Vivien Leigh was involved in an extramarital affair with her lover, actor Laurence Olivier, speculation on the legality of Goddard's marriage to Chaplin (for which a marriage certificate could not be produced) was much more widely covered in print and attracted significant negative publicity from conservative women's groups.

During this time, Selznick lent Goddard to MGM for two films: Dramatic School (1938) and the all-female ensemble The Women (1939). The first, with Luise Rainer, received mediocre reviews and failed to attract an audience. However, The Women – directed by Cukor following his firing from Gone with the Wind – was one of the year's most successful films. Of her role as Miriam Aarons, film critic Pauline Kael later wrote of Goddard, "she is a stand-out. Fun."

=== 1939–49: Paramount ===
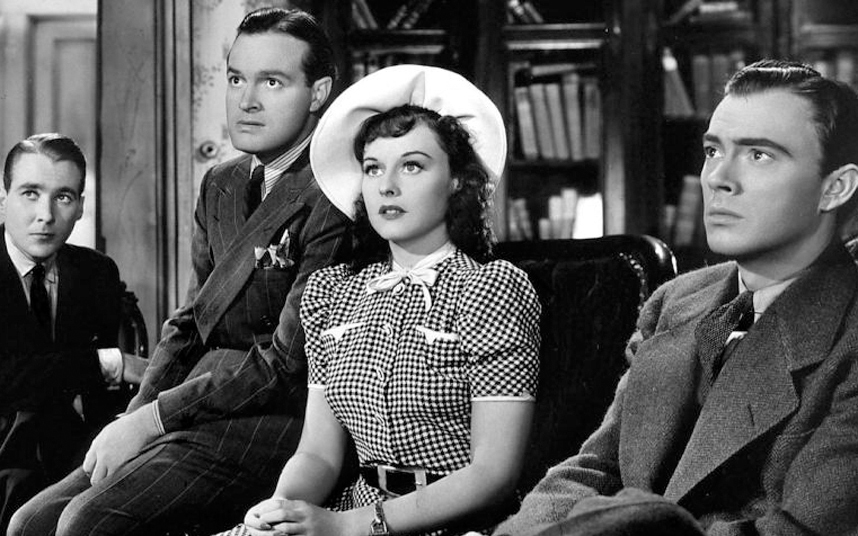
Douglass Montgomery, Bob Hope, Goddard and John Beal in The Cat and the Canary (1939)

In 1939, Goddard signed a contract with Paramount Pictures and was promptly teamed with comedian Bob Hope for the horror comedy film The Cat and the Canary (1939). The film became a turning point for both their careers, and they were promptly reteamed for The Ghost Breakers (1940) and Nothing but the Truth (1941), both of which also featured Willie Best. She was also cast for the musical comedy Second Chorus opposite Fred Astaire, Artie Shaw, and future husband Burgess Meredith. Astaire later described it as "the worst film I ever made" while Shaw admitted the film made him reconsider an acting career. In September 1939, Chaplin also began production on his next film The Great Dictator (1940) in which Goddard again co-starred alongside him as Hannah. The film was released the following year to critical and audience acclaim. However, it would also be her final film with Chaplin, as their marriage fell apart soon after.

In 1940, Goddard made the Cecil B. DeMille Western film North West Mounted Police opposite Gary Cooper and Madeleine Carroll. The film, her first dramatic role for Paramount, became one of the year's top-ten grossing films. She also starred in another musical comedy Pot o' Gold opposite James Stewart, which was released the following year. Stewart expressed similar feelings toward his film as Astaire, while Goddard's biographer Julie Gilbert claimed Goddard did not like Stewart's acting, reportedly saying "anyone can gulp". Her other film for 1941, romantic drama Hold Back the Dawn with Charles Boyer and Olivia de Havilland, received positive reviews.

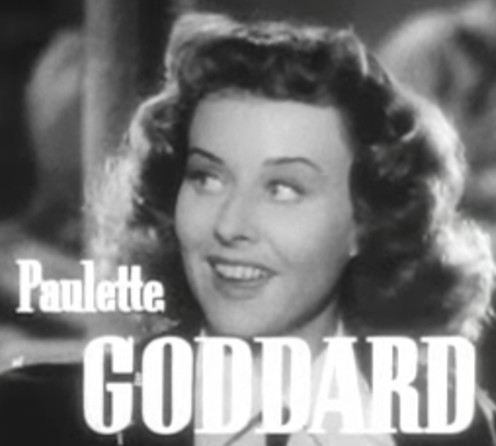
So Proudly We Hail! (1943)

In 1942, Goddard gave one of her better-remembered film appearances in the variety musical Star Spangled Rhythm, in which she sang "A Sweater, a Sarong, and a Peekaboo Bang" with Dorothy Lamour and Veronica Lake. The studio also began to pair her with Ray Milland. Her first pairing with Milland, The Lady Has Plans, was panned by critics and had a tepid box office performance. However, she quickly reunited with him and DeMille for the adventure film Reap the Wild Wind. The film, which also co-starred John Wayne and Susan Hayward, saw Goddard in a Scarlett O'Hara-type role and became the studio's best-grossing film for the year. Their third film, The Crystal Ball, was bought by United Artists – a studio co-founded by Chaplin – and released the following year to tepid box office receipts. That same year, Goddard headlined So Proudly We Hail! with Claudette Colbert and Veronica Lake. Her performance as Lt. Joan O'Doul, a nurse serving in the Battle of the Philippines, earned Goddard a nomination for an Academy Award for Best Supporting Actress at the 16th Academy Awards. She reteamed with her co-star in that film, Sonny Tufts, in I Love a Soldier the following year with less successful results.

In May 1944, Goddard renegotiated her contract with Paramount to make two films per year over a seven-year period. The first film under this deal, costume drama Kitty, reunited her with Milland. The film required Goddard to learn a cockney accent, for which she was coached by Connie Lupino, mother of actress Ida Lupino. The film was released the following year, becoming her most successful film for the studio. She also made a cameo as herself in the ensemble comedy Duffy's Tavern, based on the popular radio show. Akin to Star Spangled Rhythm, the film featured several Paramount contract players in cameos as themselves. In 1946, she starred in The Diary of a Chambermaid opposite her husband Burgess Meredith; the couple also produced the film for United Artists.

In 1947, she starred in two box office disasters: the historical epic Unconquered, which reunited her with Cooper and DeMille; and the comedy An Ideal Husband, which she made in Britain for Alexander Korda. Although one of the year's highest-grossing films, Unconquered had a large budget – further inflated by going past its shooting schedule – that caused it to lose money for Paramount. The film's story was also criticized, though Goddard and Cooper received positive reviews for their performances. During production of the film, Goddard and DeMille clashed on the set over Goddard's reluctance to do a dangerous stunt. An Ideal Husband suffered from behind-the-scenes difficulties that included a crew strike over Goddard using her personal, Swedish-born hairdresser over an English one. Besides for Britain, the film severely underperformed at the box office, being pulled in the United States with several other British films due to a boycott by the pro-Zionist group Sons of Liberty over British policies in the Palestine Mandate. The following year, Goddard reunited with Meredith in a segment of the comedy film On Our Merry Way, which he also produced. However, that same year, Meredith was placed on the Hollywood blacklist after an investigation by the House Un-American Activities Committee (Chaplin would also later be added to the blacklist). Goddard was paired with MacDonald Carey in two films for Paramount, Hazard (1948) and Bride of Vengeance (1949); and was loaned to Columbia Pictures for the film noir Anna Lucasta. However, all three of the films lost money, and she left the studio in 1949.

=== 1950–58: Freelance and television ===
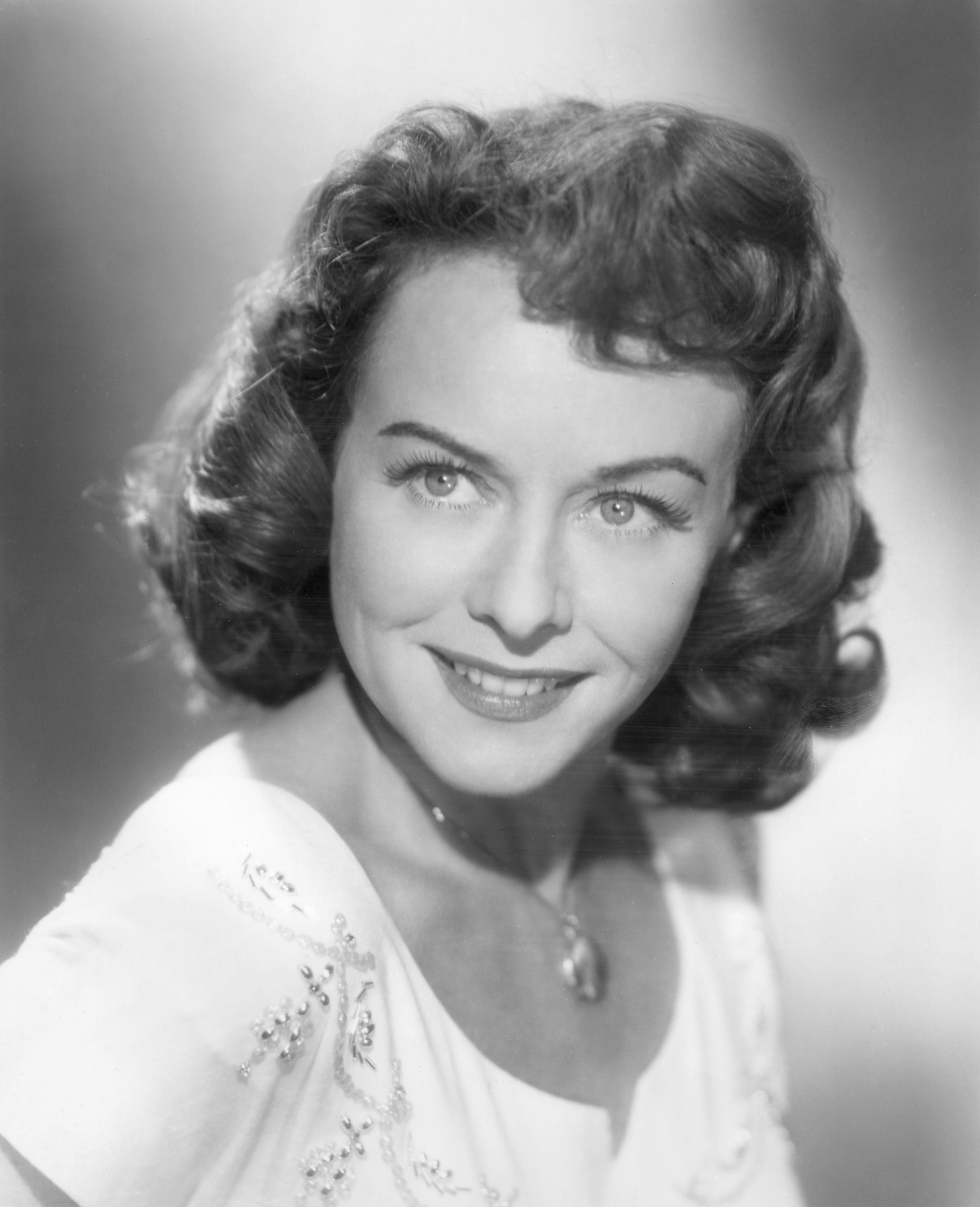
Paulette Goddard in a publicity shot for A Stranger Came Home (1954)

After leaving Paramount and divorcing Meredith, Goddard headlined the Mexican-American film The Torch (1950), also serving as an associate producer. The following year, she made her television debut in an episode of Four Star Revue. Her roles in films such as film noir Vice Squad opposite Edward G. Robinson, and the biblical character Jezebel in Sins of Jezebel failed to attract the attention of her earlier work. Her last starring film role was in the film noir A Stranger Came Home in 1954, which The New York Times deemed "A third-rate British-made whodunit," and said "A few more fly-by-nights like this Lippert presentation... and the still-shapely Miss Goddard may find herself collecting the pieces of a career"; That same year, Goddard guest starred as Lady Beryl on the second episode of Sherlock Holmes starring Ronald Howard (son of Leslie Howard) as Holmes. She continued appearing in summer stock and on television, guest starring on episodes of Adventures in Paradise, The Errol Flynn Theatre, The Joseph Cotten Show, and The Ford Television Theatre.

== Later life ==
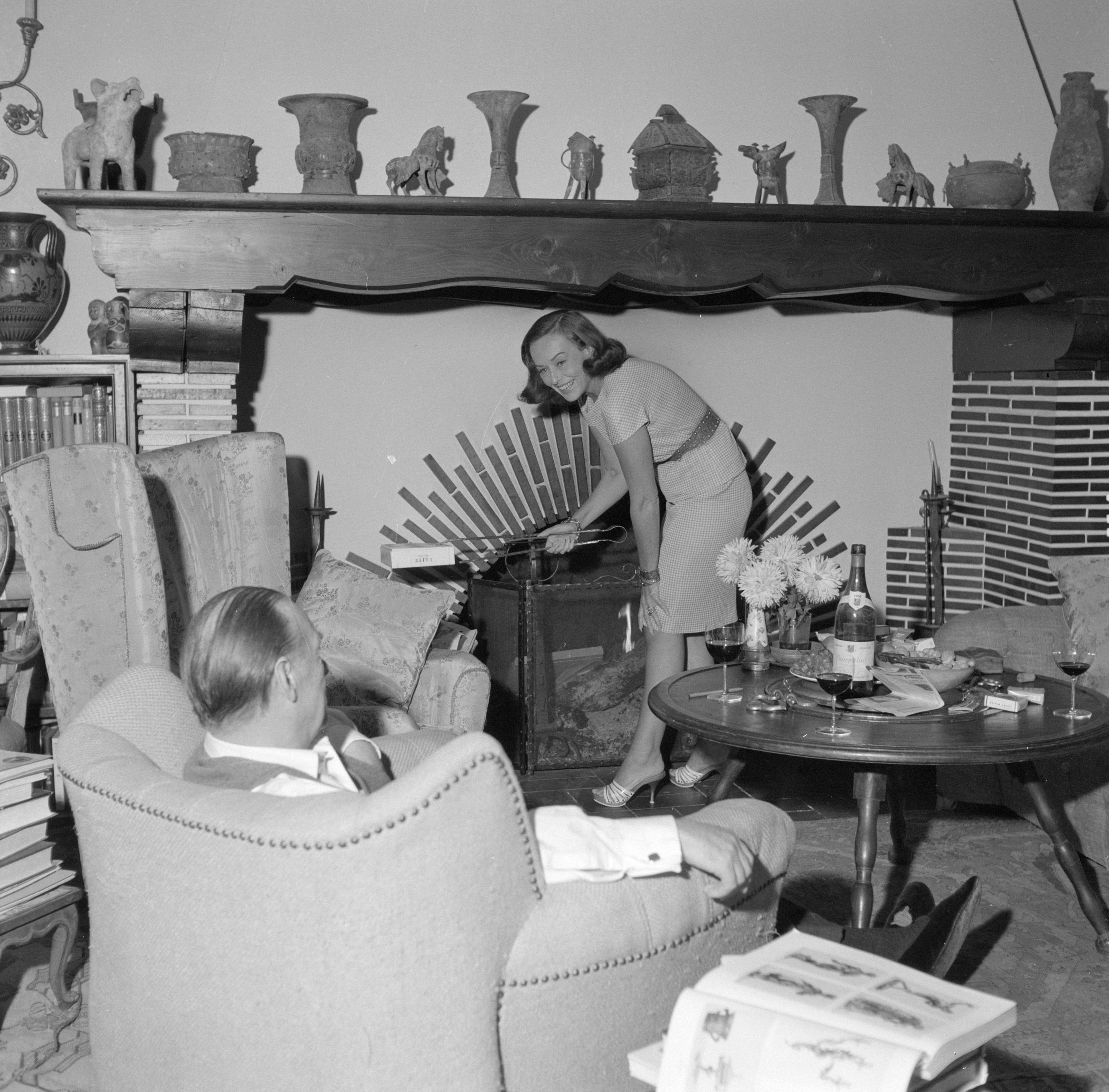
Goddard and Remarque at their home Casa Monte Tabor in 1961

In 1958, Goddard remarried for the final time to writer Erich Maria Remarque, who was twelve years her senior. Wealthy from shrewd investments, she largely retired from acting and moved with him to Ronco sopra Ascona on Lake Maggiore, Switzerland, where she lived with Remarque in his villa Casa Monte Tabor. However, she did continue to act occasionally, appearing in the unsold television pilot The Phantom, a supporting role in the Italian film Time of Indifference (1964), and a small role in the pilot of The Snoop Sisters. Remarque died on September 25, 1970, from heart failure in Locarno.

In addition to her own wealth, Goddard inherited much of Remarque's money and several important properties across Europe, including a wealth of contemporary art, which augmented her own long-standing collection. During this period, her talent at accumulating wealth became a byword among the old Hollywood elite. She also became a fairly well known and highly visible socialite in New York City, appearing covered with jewels at many high-profile cultural functions with several well-known men, including Andy Warhol, with whom she sustained a friendship for many years until his death in 1987. Goddard underwent invasive treatment for breast cancer in 1975, which by all accounts was successful.

== Personal life ==
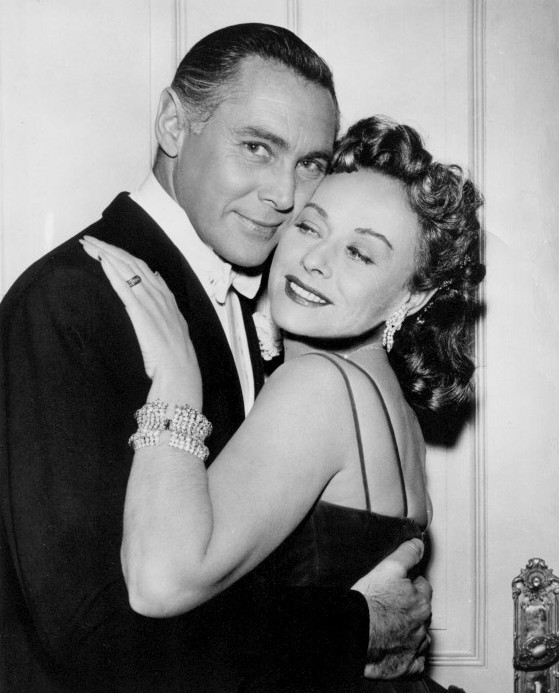
With Phillip Reed in 1957 on The Joseph Cotten Show

Goddard married the much older lumber tycoon Edgar James on June 28, 1927, when she was 17 years old; the couple moved to North Carolina. They separated two years later and divorced in January 1932.

In 1932, Goddard began a relationship with filmmaker Charlie Chaplin, and moved into his home in Beverly Hills. Aside from referring to Goddard as "my wife" at the October 1940 premiere of The Great Dictator, neither Goddard nor Chaplin publicly commented on their marital status during their time together. On June 3, 1942, Goddard filed for divorce in Mexico that was granted the following day. In his autobiography and her divorce filing, the couple claimed that they were married in June 1936 in Guangdong, China; while the couple did tour the area at this time, no record of a ceremony survives. However, Chaplin also reportedly told relatives that they were married only in common law. The two nonetheless maintained a friendly relationship following the divorce, and Goddard remained close with Chaplin's two elder sons Charles Chaplin Jr. and Sydney Chaplin.

Goddard traveled to Mexico in 1940 for Look magazine ("Paulette Goddard Discovers Mexico"), where she met Diego Rivera while living in the San Angel Inn across from his studio. She was "pursued" by Rivera and was depicted holding hands with him in his Pan American Unity mural. She accompanied him to California when he fled Mexico following death threats and attacks on him for his political activities. A follow-up story in Look (July 30, 1940) was titled "Adventure in Mexico: The Inside Story on How Paulette Goddard Helped Diego Rivera Escape Death." The FBI soon put her under surveillance to investigate her political opinions and activities.

In May 1944, Goddard married Burgess Meredith at David O. Selznick's home in Beverly Hills. In October 1944, she suffered the miscarriage of a son; it was the only pregnancy of hers reported, and she had no biological children from any of her marriages. In the latter part of their marriage, Meredith was placed on the Hollywood blacklist. On the way to a premiere, the two were mobbed by a baying crowd screaming "Communists!"; Goddard was reported to have said "Shall I roll down the window and hit them with my diamonds, Bugsy?" They divorced in June 1949.

In February 1958, Goddard married writer Erich Maria Remarque. They remained married until Remarque's death in 1970.

== Death and legacy ==
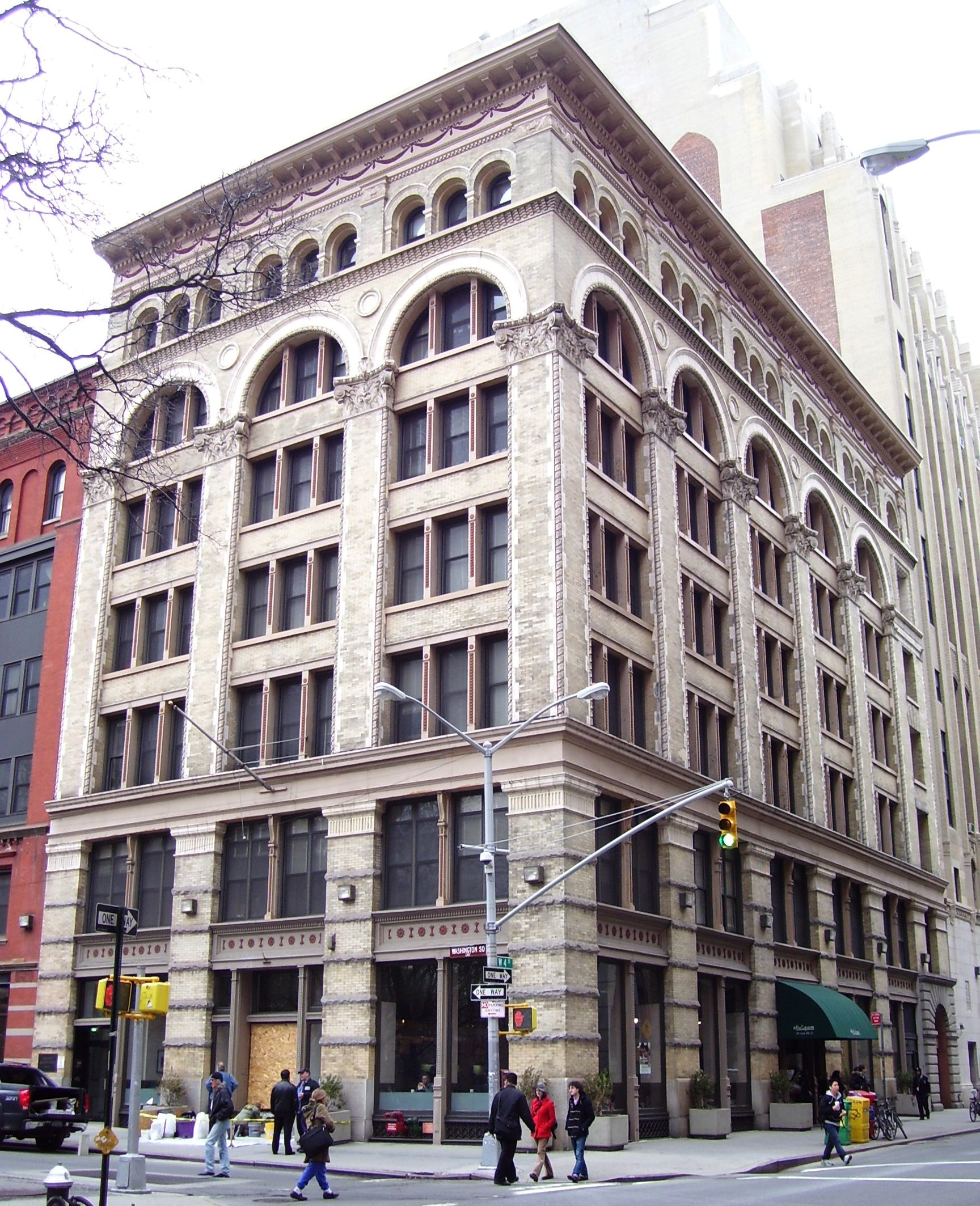
Goddard Hall, New York University

On April 23, 1990, aged 79, Goddard died at her home in Switzerland from heart failure.

Arguably, Goddard's foremost legacies remain her two feature films with Charles Chaplin — Modern Times and The Great Dictator — and a $20 million donation to New York University (NYU) in New York City to fund an institution devoted to European studies, named after Remarque. This contribution was also in recognition of her friendship with the Indiana-born politician and former NYU President John Brademas. Goddard Hall, a residence hall for NYU freshmen in Greenwich Village, is named in her honor.

There is some discussion as to whether Goddard had also donated her villa to the University. If so, the University declined the bequest due to inheritance taxes. The villa was ultimately purchased by a German couple in 2023.

=== Fictional portrayals ===
Goddard was portrayed by Gwen Humble in the made-for-TV movie Moviola: The Scarlett O'Hara War (1980), by Diane Lane in the 1992 film Chaplin, and by Natalie Wilder in the 2011 play Puma, written by Julie Gilbert, who also wrote Opposite Attraction: The Lives of Erich Maria Remarque and Paulette Goddard.

== Partial filmography ==
Film
Year	Title	Role	Notes
1929	Berth Marks	Train passenger	Short, Uncredited
1929	The Locked Door	Girl on rum boat	Uncredited
1930	Whoopee!	Goldwyn Girl	Uncredited
1931	City Streets	Dance extra	Uncredited
1931	The Girl Habit	Lingerie salesgirl	
1931	Palmy Days	Goldwyn Girl	Uncredited
1931	Ladies of the Big House	Inmate in midst of crowd	Uncredited
1932	The Mouthpiece	Blonde at party	Uncredited
1932	Show Business	Blonde train passenger	Short, Uncredited
1932	Young Ironsides	Herself, Miss Hollywood	Short, Uncredited
1932	Pack Up Your Troubles	Bridesmaid	Uncredited
1932	Girl Grief	Student	Short, Uncredited
1932	The Kid from Spain	Goldwyn Girl	Uncredited
1933	Hollywood on Parade No. B-1	Herself	Short
1933	The Bowery	Blonde who announces Brodie's jump	Uncredited
1933	Hollywood on Parade No. B-5	Herself	Short
1933	Roman Scandals	Goldwyn Girl	Uncredited
1934	Kid Millions	Goldwyn Girl	Uncredited
1936	Modern Times	Ellen Peterson – A Gamine	
1936	The Bohemian Girl	Gypsy vagabond	Uncredited
1938	The Young in Heart	Leslie Saunders	
1938	Dramatic School	Nana	
1939	The Women	Miriam Aarons	
1939	The Cat and the Canary	Joyce Norman	
1940	The Ghost Breakers	Mary Carter	
1940	The Great Dictator	Hannah	
1940	Screen Snapshots: Sports in Hollywood	Herself	Short
1940	North West Mounted Police	Louvette Corbeau	Alternative titles: Northwest Mounted Police; The Scarlet Riders
1940	Second Chorus	Ellen Miller	
1941	Pot o' Gold	Molly McCorkle	Alternative titles: The Golden Hour; Jimmy Steps Out
1941	Hold Back the Dawn	Anita Dixon	
1941	Nothing But the Truth	Gwen Saunders	
1942	The Lady Has Plans	Sidney Royce	
1942	Reap the Wild Wind	Loxi Claiborne	Alternative title: Cecil B. DeMille's Reap the Wild Wind
1942	The Forest Rangers	Celia Huston Stuart	
1942	Star Spangled Rhythm	Herself	
1943	The Crystal Ball	Toni Gerard	
1943	So Proudly We Hail!	Lt. Joan O'Doul	Nominated — Academy Award for Best Supporting Actress
1944	Standing Room Only	Jane Rogers / Suzanne	
1944	I Love a Soldier	Evelyn Connors	
1945	Duffy's Tavern	Herself	
1945	Kitty	Kitty	
1946	The Diary of a Chambermaid	Célestine	Producer, Uncredited
1947	Suddenly, It's Spring	Mary Morely	
1947	Variety Girl	Herself	
1947	Unconquered	Abigail "Abby" Martha Hale	
1947	An Ideal Husband	Mrs. Laura Cheveley	Alternative title: Oscar Wilde's An Ideal Husband
1948	On Our Merry Way	Martha Pease	
1948	Screen Snapshots: Smiles and Styles	Herself	Short
1948	Hazard	Ellen Crane	
1949	Bride of Vengeance	Lucretia Borgia	
1949	Anna Lucasta	Anna Lucasta	
1949	A Yank Comes Back	Herself	Short, Uncredited
1950	The Torch	María Dolores Penafiel	Associate producer Alternative title: Bandit General
1952	Babes in Bagdad	Kyra	
1953	Vice Squad	Mona Ross	Alternative title: The Girl in Room 17
1953	Sins of Jezebel	Jezebel	
1953	Paris Model	Betty Barnes	Alternative title: Nude at Midnight
1954	Charge of the Lancers	Tanya	
1954	A Stranger Came Home	Angie	Alternative title: The Unholy Four
1964	Time of Indifference	Mariagrazia	Alternative titles: Les Deux Rivales; Gli Indifferenti

Television
Year	Title	Role	Notes
1951	Four Star Revue	Guest actress	Episode #1.41
1952	The Ed Sullivan Show	Herself	2 episodes
1953	Ford Theatre	Nancy Whiting	Episode: "The Doctor's Downfall"
1954	Sherlock Holmes	Lady Beryl	Episode: "The Case of Lady Beryl"
1955	Producers' Showcase	Sylvia Fowler	Episode: "The Woman"
1957	The Errol Flynn Theatre	Rachel	Episode: "Mademoiselle Fifi"
1957	The Joseph Cotten Show: On Trial	Dolly	Episode: "The Ghost of Devil's Island"
1957	Ford Theatre	Holly March	Episode: "Singapore"
1959	Adventures in Paradise	Mme. Victorine Reynard	Episode: "The Lady from South Chicago"
1959	What's My Line?	Guest panelist	November 29, 1959 episode
1961	The Phantom	Mrs. Harris	Unsold pilot
1965	Valentine's Day	Aunt Henrietta	Episode: "Which Witch?"
1972	The Snoop Sisters	Norma Treet	TV movie Alternative title: Female Instinct (final acting appearance)

Radio
Year	Title	Role	Notes (Source: unless otherwise noted.)
1939-1947	Lux Radio Theatre		7 episodes
1939	The Campbell Playhouse		Episode: "Algiers"
1940, 1941	The Gulf Screen Guild Theatre		2 episodes
1941	Cavalcade of America		Episode: "The Gorgeous Hussy"
1941	Screen Guild Players	Frenchy	Episode: "Destry Rides Again"
1942, 1952	Philip Morris Playhouse		2 episodes
1942-1948	The Screen Guild Theater		7 episodes
1945	Theatre Guild on the Air		Episode: "At Mrs. Beam's"
1947	Hollywood Players		Episode: "5th Ave. Girl"
1952	Broadway Playhouse		Episode: "Standing Room Only"

== Sources ==
- Gilbert, Julie (1995). Opposite Attraction – The Lives of Erich Maria Remarque and Paulette Goddard. Pantheon Books. ISBN 0-679-41535-1.
- Haver, Ronald (1980). David O. Selznick's Hollywood. Bonanza Books, New York. ISBN 0-517-47665-7.
- Kael, Pauline (1982). 5001 Nights at the Movies. Arrow Books, London. ISBN 0-09-933550-6.
- Shipman, David (1970). The Great Movie Stars, The Golden Years. Bonanza Books, New York. ASIN B000O94LLG.
- Walker, Alexander (1987). Vivien, The Life of Vivien Leigh. Grove Press. ISBN 0-8021-3259-6.
