= The 50 Greatest Jewish Movies =

The 50 Greatest Jewish Movies: A Critic's Ranking of the Very Best was a 1998 book published by Kathryn Bernheimer. Bernheimer ranked the "top 50" films dealing with Jewish topics.

== Selections ==
The top three films were, in descending order, The Chosen, Fiddler on the Roof and Schindler's List.

== Bibliography ==
- Bernheimer, Kathryn. The 50 Greatest Jewish Movies: A Critic's Ranking of the Very Best. Secaucus, NJ: Carol, 1998.
