= Hayduke =

Environmentalist terminology

Hayduke is a term and verb used among environmental activists and people who cite cult "revenge" books.

It derives from the name of George Washington Hayduke, a fictional character based on Edward Abbey's friend Doug Peacock in Abbey's cult classics The Monkey Wrench Gang and Hayduke Lives!. The Hayduke character personified the "no compromise in defense of the Earth" approach to environmentalism, made real in early Earth First! activism.

== Background ==
A complete series of revenge books using the pseudonym George Hayduke exist, mostly published by the Paladin Press, including The Big Book of Revenge, Get Even, Make 'Em Pay, Up Yours and Screw Unto Others. Each describe various methods of committing mischief and mayhem against those who have wronged others in a manner reminiscent of The Anarchist Cookbook. "Haydukery" refers to committing such acts in general.

== See also ==
- Hajduk – a name for highwaymen or guerrilla freedom fighters in parts of Europe during the late 16th to mid 19th century
