= Black Sun (Abbey novel) =

1971 novel by Edward Abbey

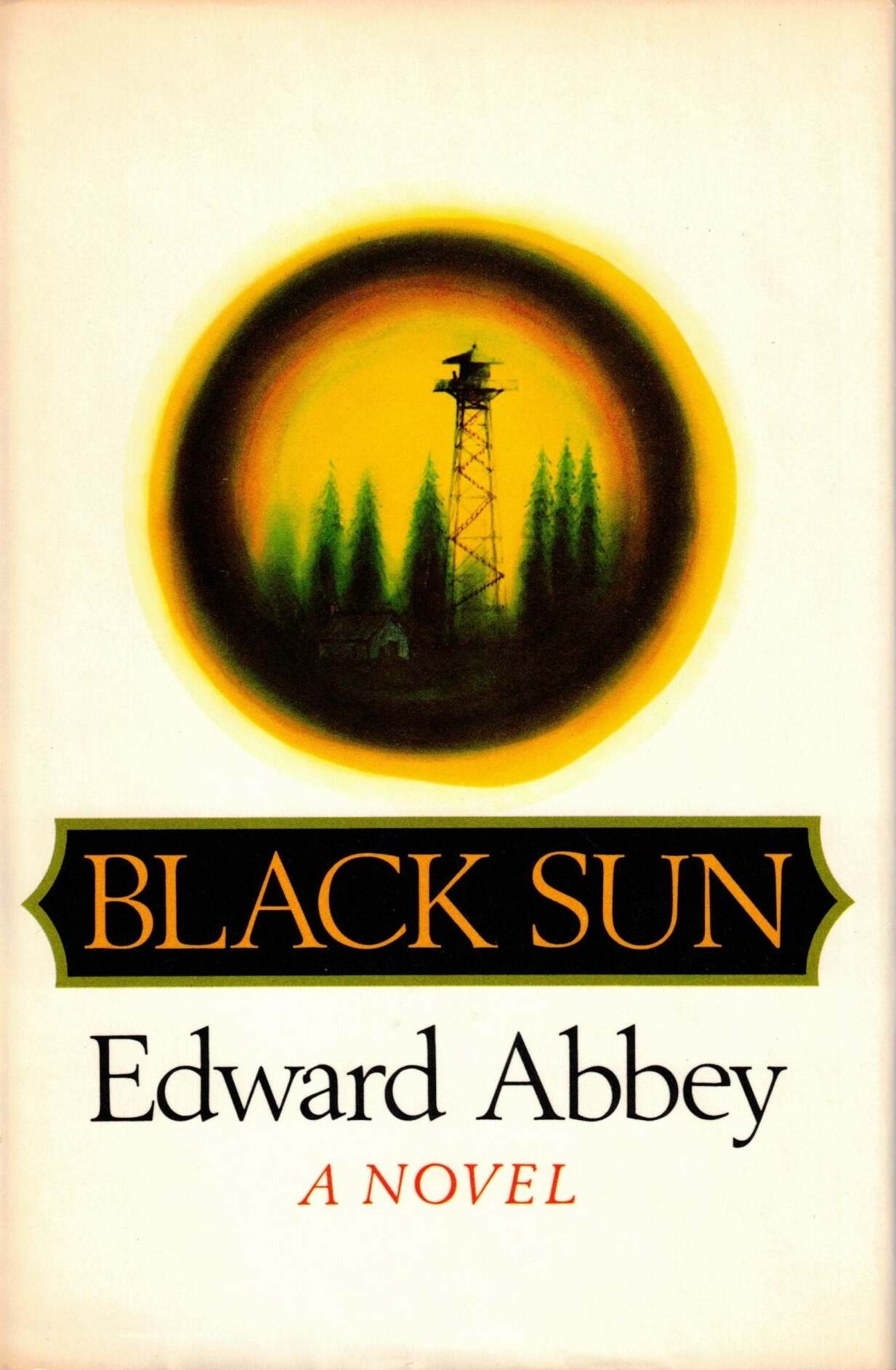
- First edition
- Author: Edward Abbey
- Language: English
- Genre: Western
- Publisher: Simon & Schuster
- Publication date: 1971
- Publication place: United States
- Media type: Print (hardback, paperback)
- Pages: 159
- ISBN: 978-1555662868
- OCLC: 52341564
- Dewey Decimal: 813/.54 21
- LC Class: PS3551.B2 B56 2003
- Preceded by: Fire on the Mountain
- Followed by: The Monkey Wrench Gang

Black Sun is a 1971 novel by Edward Abbey. It is about a fire lookout who falls in love with an American girl and is wrongly blamed when she mysteriously disappears in Grand Canyon National Park.

== Background ==
Although the location is not mentioned by name in the novel, it is set at the North Rim of Grand Canyon National Park, where Abbey worked at the time as a fire lookout in the fire tower just east of the main entrance at the North Rim. Stephen J. Pyne in his memoirs of his years as a firefighter at the North Rim, Fire on the Rim, wrote, concerning Abbey: "fire busts came and went with hardly a word from the North Rim tower. Whether Abner was even in the tower, no one could say. He was a writer, and the only smokes he reported were the ones in his novels. He lived in a trailer behind the entrance cabin, but he was absent so often that he demonstrated that we did not need a lookout, because having Abner in the tower was the same as having no one. The position was abolished." Abbey was there for four seasons and wrote a nonfiction account in his book Abbey's Road.

Abbey dedicated the book to his second wife Judy, who had died of acute leukemia just before publication of the novel. Because Judy had spent some time with Abbey when he worked as a fire ranger, some readers naturally believe the book is based on their relationship. However, according to James M. Cahalan's Edward Abbey: A Life, the character of Sandy MacKenzie was actually based on a woman Abbey had an affair with in 1963. His first draft of this book was completed in 1968, two years before Judy's death. Calhalan writes: "it was a bone of contention in their marriage. He reported on March 17, 1968, that Judy hated it, 'thinking it the story of one of my old love affairs, which in a way it is, but only in a greatly altered and much exaggerated way. If only she understood that there's nothing deader than a dead romance.'"

Black Sun may have been the original title considered to an earlier book Abbey had written about a group of young mohicans driving across the western United States on U.S. Route 66, but the book was never published and remains unpublished to this day. Terry Bisson wrote in American Rebels (2003) that the title Abbey was considering was "Down the Road." The reason that manuscript was never published was because not long after Abbey finished his book, On the Road by Jack Kerouac appeared, and the two books bore so many resemblances that Abbey feared he would be accused of plagiarism if his novel were published.

The term "black sun" was used often in Abbey's work. He used it first in his second book, Fire on the Mountain to describe a sketch Billy makes after they discover someone has shot Billy's favorite horse, Rascal. He also uses it twice in his non-fiction book, The Journey Home and once in Abbey's Road.

== Plot summary ==
The book is divided into three parts: In the forest; In the sun; and In the evening.

The novel is about a rugged fire lookout, Will Gatlin, who falls in love with an American girl half his age and then becomes wrongly blamed when she mysteriously disappears in the nearby Grand Canyon National Park.

== Characters ==
- Will Gatlin – A 37-year-old ranger who mans a fire watch tower in the forest.
- Sandy MacKenzie – A brash 19-year-old woman who is falling in love with the forest.
- Art Ballentine – A college professor and friend of Will's.
- Elsie Ballentine – Art's wife
- Gloria Hollenbeck – A friend of Sandy's who Will thinks of as the "rodeo queen."
- Wendell – Will's boss, to whom he reports every morning from the fire watch tower
- Lawrence J. Turner the Third – Sandy's fiance and a 23-year-old Air Force cadet
- Rosalie – A woman Will would see on a semi-regular basis for sex who lived 90 miles away with her three children

== Reception ==
The book was not well received by critics and the public. The first-run paperback edition by Avon sold only 100,000 copies, whereas the first run of paperback editions for Desert Solitaire and The Monkey Wrench Gang both sold more than a half million copies. According to James M. Cahalan's biography of Abbey, Edward Abbey: A Life, The New Yorker called Black Sun "an embarrassingly bad novel." Abbey himself, however, considered it one of the best books he had ever written.
