= Seldom Seen (disambiguation) =

Seldom Seen may refer to:

== Places ==
- Seldom Seen, a prior name for the unincorporated community, Stony Bottom, West Virginia
- Seldom Seen, a locality in Wulgulmerang East in the Shire of East Gippsland, in the north-east of Victoria, Australia
- Seldom Seen, a locality in Glencoyne in Cumbria, England

== Music ==
- "Seldom Seen", a track on the 2000 album Mo Thugs III: The Mothership by Mo Thugs Family
- "Seldom Seen Sam", a track on the 1974 album. M'Lady by Colleen Hewett
- "Seldom Seen Sam", a track on the 1995 album Forgotten Roads: The Best of If by If
- The Seldom Seen Kid, a 2008 album by English rock band Elbow
- Seldom Seen Often Heard, a 2006 album by producer Ghost (producer)
- Seven Songs Seldom Seen, a VHS release by the band Toad the Wet Sprocket c. 1992

== Buildings and properties ==
- Seldom Seen, family property in the autobiography, The Land Remembers, of Ben Logan
- Seldom Seen Farm, a farm in Leicestershire
- Seldom Seen Arch, an archway over Saw Mill Run in Beechview, Pittsburgh, Pennsylvania

== Literature ==
- Seldom Seen Smith, a character in the novels The Monkey Wrench Gang and Hayduke Lives! by Edward Abbey
- Seldom Seen Road, a book of poetry by Jen Butler nominated for the Raymond Souster Award

== Horses ==
- Seldom Seen, a connemara/thoroughbred cross that competed at the highest levels of dressage
- Seldom Seen Sue, a thoroughbred, the 1987 winner of the Adoration Stakes

== Film ==
- Seldom Seen, a gangster in the film Kansas City (film) played by Harry Belafonte
- Hezzikia "Seldom Seen" Jackson, a character in the film Penitentiary (1979 film) played by Floyd Chatman

== See also ==
- The Seldom Scene, an American bluegrass band
