= George Hayduke (character) =

Environmentalist character in Edward Abbey's novels

George Washington Hayduke is a fictional character in Edward Abbey's novels The Monkey Wrench Gang and Hayduke Lives! Hayduke is portrayed as a rugged individualist with a predilection for working independently when protecting the environment. He is at first skeptical of working with the rest of the monkey wrench gang early in the first book, but soon collaborates with them.

== Description ==
Hayduke is an ex-Green Beret, one-time explosives expert and medic in the Vietnam War; and an American environmentalist hero. The specific cultural use of the term Hayduke is derived from this character.

== Origins ==
The character of Hayduke was based on his friend and author, Doug Peacock, a Vietnam vet that Abbey befriended and traveled with in the Southwest United States. He is most likely named after the Haiduks, rebels in the Ottoman Empire, and one of Eric Hobsbawm's archetypal bandits.

Hayduke is Abbey's codification of the wants, longings, and desires of the average male environmentalist awash in the frustrations of corporate greed and corruption where the voice of the little people remain unheard – until the little people rise up and take direct action because, as Abbey's Monkey Wrench Gang puts it, "somebody has to do it."

== Books ==
George Washington Hayduke's first set of adventures are outlined in 1975's The Monkey Wrench Gang.

In 1989 (the year of Abbey's death) Hayduke Lives! was released. The adventures of Hayduke and the original Monkey Wrench Gang become tied with the activities of more legitimate environmental organizations like Earth First!. The Earth Liberation Front and the Animal Liberation Front did not exist at the time Abbey wrote The Monkey Wrench Gang.

Hayduke was also referenced in other novels by Abbey. In Fire on the Mountain (1968), the owner of the local general store is named "Hayduke." In Good News (1980), the character of Jack Burns attempts to convince his son, now an adult, that he is his father. However, his son refuses to believe him, claiming that his real father was killed while blowing up a dam. Targeting the dam was always Hayduke's highest aspiration.

== Aliases ==
George Hayduke uses a number of aliases over the course of the books, including: Leopold, Rudolf the Red, Herman Smith, Fred Goodsell, Crazy Horse.

== Author ==
Since 1980, an anonymous author known as "George Hayduke" has brought the Hayduke character to life in a well-known series of revenge books. Hayduke states that Edward Abbey was his mentor and says The Monkey Wrench Gang inspired the founding of Earth First!.
