= Desert Solitaire =

Autobiography by American writer Edward Abbey

Desert Solitaire: A Season in the Wilderness
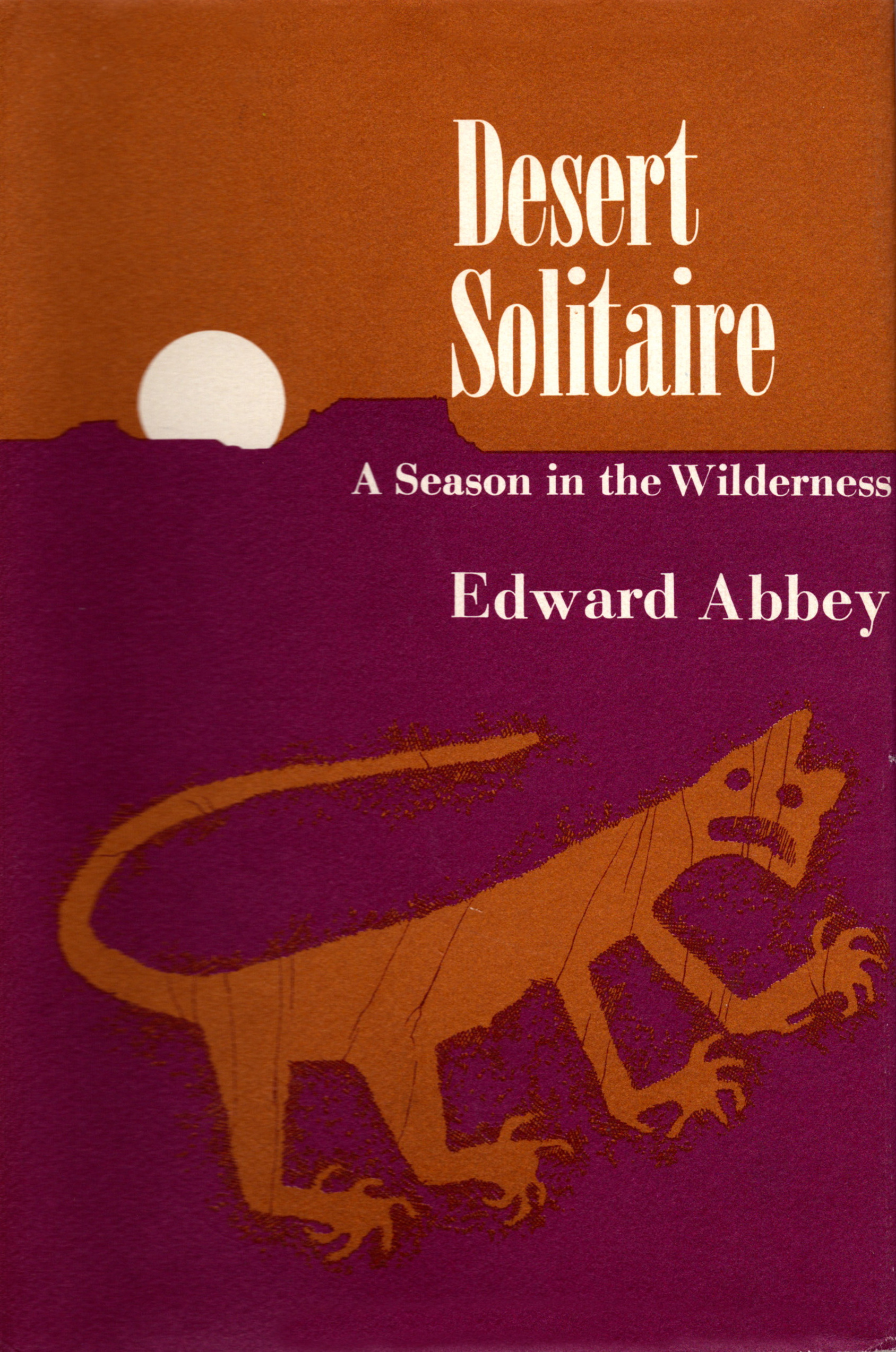
- First edition cover
- Author: Edward Abbey
- Illustrator: Peter Parnall
- Language: English
- Genre: Autobiography
- Publisher: McGraw-Hill
- Publication date: 1968
- Publication place: United States
- Media type: Hardcover
- Pages: 336
- ISBN: 9780008283322

Desert Solitaire: A Season in the Wilderness is an autobiographical work by American writer Edward Abbey, originally published in 1968. It is his fourth book and his first book-length non-fiction work. The book follows three fiction books: Jonathan Troy (1954), The Brave Cowboy (1956), and Fire on the Mountain (1962). Although it initially garnered little attention, Desert Solitaire was eventually recognized as an iconic work of nature writing and a staple of early environmentalist writing, bringing Abbey critical acclaim and popularity as a writer of environmental, political, and philosophical issues.

Based on Abbey's activities as a park ranger at Arches National Monument (now Arches National Park) in the late 1950s, the book is often compared to Henry David Thoreau's Walden and Aldo Leopold's A Sand County Almanac. It is written as a series of vignettes about Abbey's experiences in the Colorado Plateau region of the desert Southwestern United States, ranging from vivid descriptions of the fauna, flora, geology, and human inhabitants of the area, to firsthand accounts of wilderness exploration and river running, to a polemic against development and excessive tourism in the national parks, to stories of the author's work with a search and rescue team to pull a human corpse out of the desert. The book is interspersed with observations and discussions about the various tensions – physical, social, and existential – between humans and the desert environment. Many of the chapters also engage in lengthy critiques of modern Western civilization, United States politics, and the decline of America's natural environment.

== Background ==
In 1956 and 1957, Edward Abbey worked as a seasonal ranger for the United States National Park Service at Arches National Monument, near the town of Moab, Utah. Abbey held the position from April to September each year, during which time he maintained trails, greeted visitors, and collected campground fees. He lived in a house trailer provided to him by the Park Service, as well as in a ramada that he built himself. The area around Moab in that period was still a wilderness habitat and largely undeveloped, with only small numbers of park visitors and limited access to most areas of the monument.

During his stay at Arches, Abbey accumulated a large volume of notes and sketches which later formed the basis of his first non-fiction work, Desert Solitaire. These notes remained unpublished for almost a decade while Abbey pursued other jobs and attempted with only moderate success to pursue other writing projects, including three novels which proved to be commercial and critical failures. Eventually Abbey revisited the Arches notes and diaries in 1967, and after some editing and revising had them published as a book in 1968.

Although Abbey rejected the label of nature writing to describe his work, Desert Solitaire was one of a number of influential works which contributed to the popularity and interest in the nature writing genre in the 1960s and 1970s. He cited as inspiration and referred to other earlier writers of the genre, particularly Mary Hunter Austin, Henry David Thoreau, and Walt Whitman, whose style Abbey echoed in the structure of his work. However, Abbey's writing in this period was also significantly more confrontational and politically charged than in earlier works, and like contemporary Rachel Carson in Silent Spring, he sought to contribute to the wider political movement of environmentalism which was emerging at the time. Abbey went on to admire the nature writing and environmentalist contemporaries of that period, particularly Annie Dillard.

== Contents ==
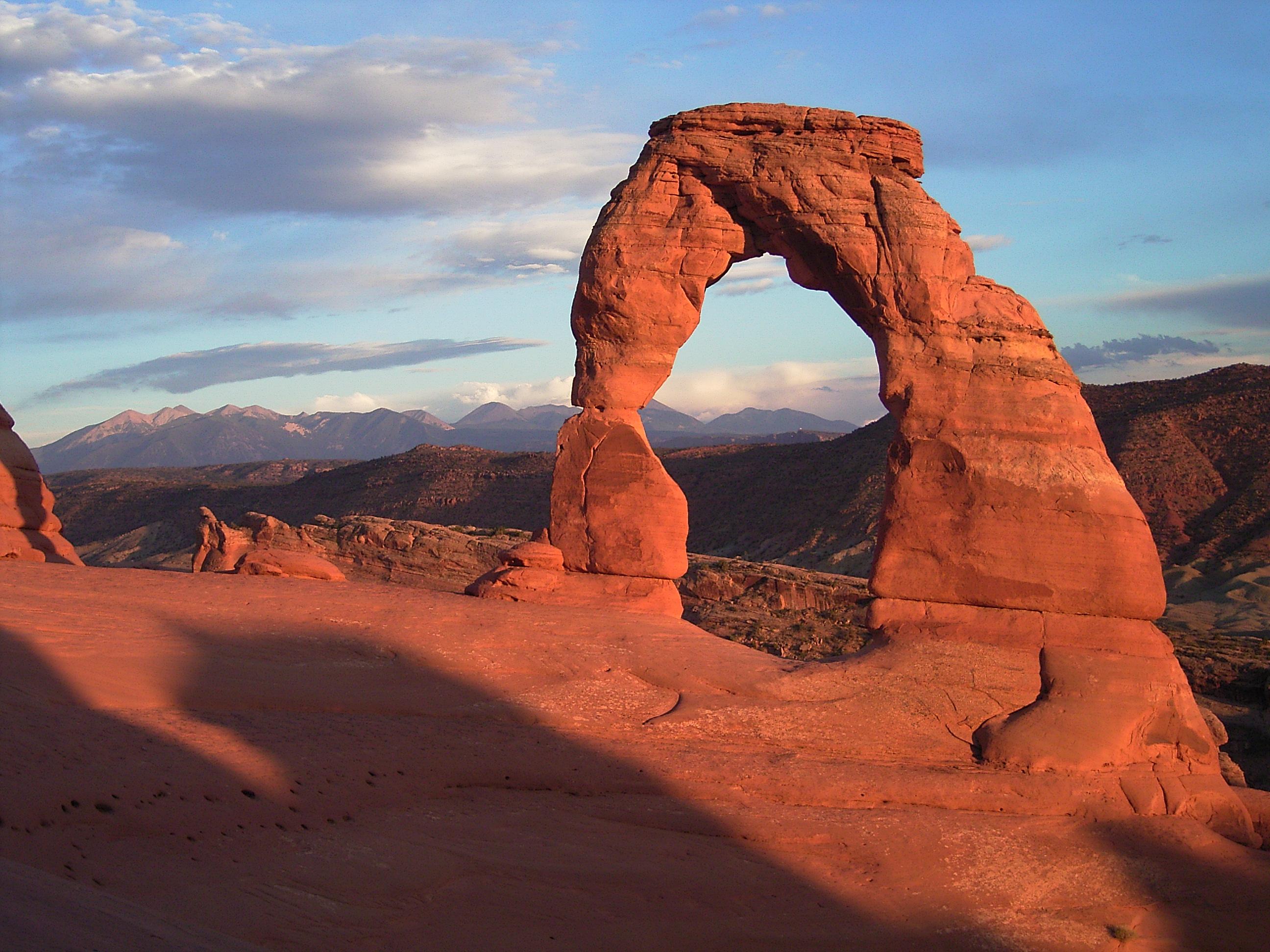
Abbey's narrative follows his experiences as a ranger at Arches National Monument in the late 1950s.

Desert Solitaire is a collection of treatises and autobiographical excerpts describing Abbey's experiences as a park ranger and wilderness enthusiast in 1956 and 1957. The opening chapters, First Morning and Solitaire, focus on the author's experiences arriving at and creating a life within Arches National Monument. In this early period the park is relatively undeveloped: road access and camping facilities are basic, and there is a low volume of tourist traffic.

Many of the book's chapters are studies of the animals, plants, geography, and climate of the region around Arches National Monument. Cliffrose and Bayonets and Serpents of Paradise focus on Abbey's descriptions of the fauna and flora of the Arches area, respectively, and his observations of the already deteriorating balance of biodiversity in the desert due to the pressures of human settlement in the region. Abbey provides detailed inventories and observations of the life of desert plants, and their unique adaptations to their harsh surroundings, including the cliffrose, juniper, pinyon pine, and sand sage. He comments on the decline of the large desert predators, particularly bobcats, coyotes, mountain lions, and wildcats, and criticizes the roles ranchers and the policies of the Department of Agriculture have had in the elimination of these animals, which in turn has fostered unchecked growth in deer and rabbit populations, thereby damaging the delicate balance of the desert ecosystem.

In the aforementioned chapters and in Rocks, Abbey also describes at length the geology he encounters in Arches National Monument, particularly the iconic formations of Delicate Arch and Double Arch. In Water, Abbey discusses how the ecosystem adapts to the arid conditions of the Southwest, and how the springs, creeks and other stores of water in their own ways support some of the diverse but fragile plant and animal life. Some of the oddities of water in the desert, such as flash floods and quicksand, are also explored.

Abbey contrasts the natural adaptation of the environment to low-water conditions with increasing human demands to create more reliable water sources. The Heat of Noon: Rock and Tree and Cloud describes the intensity of the summer months in the park and the various ways in which animals and humans have tried to survive and adapt in those conditions. In considering the inhospitable heat of the desert, he also meditates on the idea that "wilderness" is a necessary fantasy of escape to relieve the madness of civilization.

Several chapters focus on Abbey's interactions with the people of the Southwest or explorations of human history. In Rocks, Abbey examines the influence of mining in the region, particularly the search for lead, silver, uranium, and zinc. He contrasts the difficult lives of the many who unsuccessfully sought their fortune in the desert whilst others left millionaires from lucky strikes, and the legacy of government policy and human greed that can be seen in the modern landscape of mines and shafts, roads and towns. Abbey offers the fable of one "Albert T. Husk" who gave up everything and met his demise in the desert, in the elusive search for buried riches.

In two chapters entitled Cowboys and Indians, Abbey describes his encounters with Roy and Viviano ("cowboys") and the Navajo of the area ("Indians"), finding both to be victims of a fading way of life in the Southwest, and in desperate need of better solutions to growing problems and declining opportunities. Abbey also comments on some of the particular cultural artifacts of the region, such as the Basque population, the Mormons, and the archaeological remains of the Ancient Puebloan peoples in cliff dwellings, stone petroglyphs, and pictographs.

Several chapters center around Abbey's expeditions beyond the park, either accompanied or alone, and often serve as opportunities for rich descriptions of the surrounding environments and further observations about the natural and human world. Specifically, his search for a wild horse in the canyons (The Moon-Eyed Horse), his camping around the Havasupai tribal lands and his temporary entrapment on a cliff face there (Havasu), the discovery of a dead tourist at an isolated area of what is now Canyonlands National Park (The Dead Man at Grandview Point), his attempt to navigate the Maza area of the Canyonlands National Park (Terra Incognita: Into the Maze), and his ascent of Mount Tukuhnikivats (Tukuhnikivats, the Island in the Desert) are recounted.

Down the River, the longest chapter of the book, recalls a journey by boat down Glen Canyon undertaken by Abbey and an associate, in part inspired by John Wesley Powell's original voyage of discovery in 1869. Their journey is taken in the final months before its flooding by the Glen Canyon Dam, in which Abbey notes that many of the natural wonders encountered on the journey would be inundated.

Finally, several chapters are devoted largely to Abbey's reflections on the damaging impact of humans on the everyday life, nature, and culture of the region. Polemic: Industrial Tourism and the National Parks is an essay fiercely criticizing the policies and vision of the National Park Service, particularly the process by which developing the parks for automotive access has dehumanized the experiences of nature, and created a generation of lazy and unadventurous Americans whilst permanently damaging the views and landscapes of the parks. In Episodes and Visions, Abbey meditates on religion, philosophy, and literature and their intersections with desert life, as well as collects various thoughts on the tension between culture and civilization, espousing many tenets in support of environmentalism. In Bedrock and Paradox, Abbey details his mixed feelings about his return to New York City after his term as a ranger has finished, and his paradoxical desires for both solitude and community. Abbey also describes his difficulty finding the language, faith, and philosophy to adequately capture his understanding of nature and its effect on the soul.

== Themes and style ==
Desert Solitaire depicts Abbey's preoccupation with the deserts of the American Southwest. He describes how the desert affects society and more specifically the individual on a multifaceted, sensory level.

Many of the ideas and themes drawn out in the book are contradictory. For example: Abbey is dogmatically opposed in various sections to modernity that alienates man from their natural environment and spoils the desert landscapes, and yet at various points relies completely on modern contrivances to explore and live in the desert. Additionally, he expresses his deep and abiding respect for all forms of life in his philosophy, but describes unflinchingly his contempt for the cattle he herds in the canyons, and in another scene he remorselessly stones a rabbit, angry about rabbits' overabundance in the desert. Similarly, he remarks that he hates ants and plunges his walking stick into an ant hill for no reason other than to make the ants mad.

However, Abbey deliberately highlights many of the paradoxes and comments on them in his final chapter, particularly in regard to his conception of the desert landscape itself. He introduces the desert as "the flaming globe, blazing on the pinnacles and minarets and balanced rocks" and describes his initial reaction to his newfound environment and its challenges. For Abbey, the desert is a symbol of strength, and he is "comforted by [the] solidity and resistance" of his natural surroundings. However, he also sees the desert as "a-tonal, cruel, clear, inhuman, neither romantic nor classical, motionless and emotionless, at one and the same time – another paradox – both agonized and deeply still."

The desert, he writes, represents a harsh reality unseen by the masses. It is this harshness that makes "the desert more alluring, more baffling, more fascinating", increasing the vibrancy of life.

In his narrative, Abbey is both an individual, solitary and independent, and a member of a greater ecosystem, as both predator and prey. This duality ultimately allows him the freedom to prosper, as "love flowers best in openness in freedom."

Abbey's overall entrancement with the desert, and in turn its indifference towards man, is prevalent throughout his writings. To Abbey, the desert represents both the end of one life and the beginning of another:

The finest quality of this stone, these plants and animals, this desert landscape is the indifference manifest to our presence, our absence, our staying or our going. Whether we live or die is a matter of absolutely no concern whatsoever to the desert. Let men in their madness blast every city on earth into black rubble and envelope the entire planet in a cloud of lethal gas – the canyons and hills, the springs and rocks will still be here, the sunlight will filter through, water will form and warmth shall be upon the land and after sufficient time, now matter how long, somewhere, living things will emerge and join and stand once again, this time perhaps to take a different and better course.

Like Thoreau's Walden and Leopold's A Sand County Almanac, Abbey adopts a style of narrative in Desert Solitaire that compresses multiple years of observations and experiences into a singular narrative that follows the timeline of a single cycle of the seasons. In this process, many of the events and characters described are often fictionalized in many key respects, and the account is not entirely true to the author's actual experiences, highlighting the importance of the philosophical and aesthetic qualities of the writing rather than its strict adherence to an autobiographical genre.

=== Modernity and industrial society ===
One of the dominant themes in Desert Solitaire is Abbey's disgust with mainstream culture and its effect on society. His message is that civilization and nature each have their own culture, and it is necessary for survival that they remain separate: "The personification of the natural is exactly the tendency I wish to suppress in myself, to eliminate for good. I am here not only to escape for a while the clamor and filth and confusion of the cultural apparatus but also to confront, immediately and directly if it's possible, the bare bones of existence, elemental and fundamental, the bedrock which sustains us."

Abbey's impression is that we are trapped by the machinations of mainstream culture. This is made apparent with quotes such as: "Yet history demonstrates that personal liberty is a rare and precious thing, that all societies tend toward the absolute until an attack from without or collapse from within breaks up the social machine and makes freedom and innovation again possible." He also believes the daily routine is meaningless, that we have created a life that we do not even want to live in:

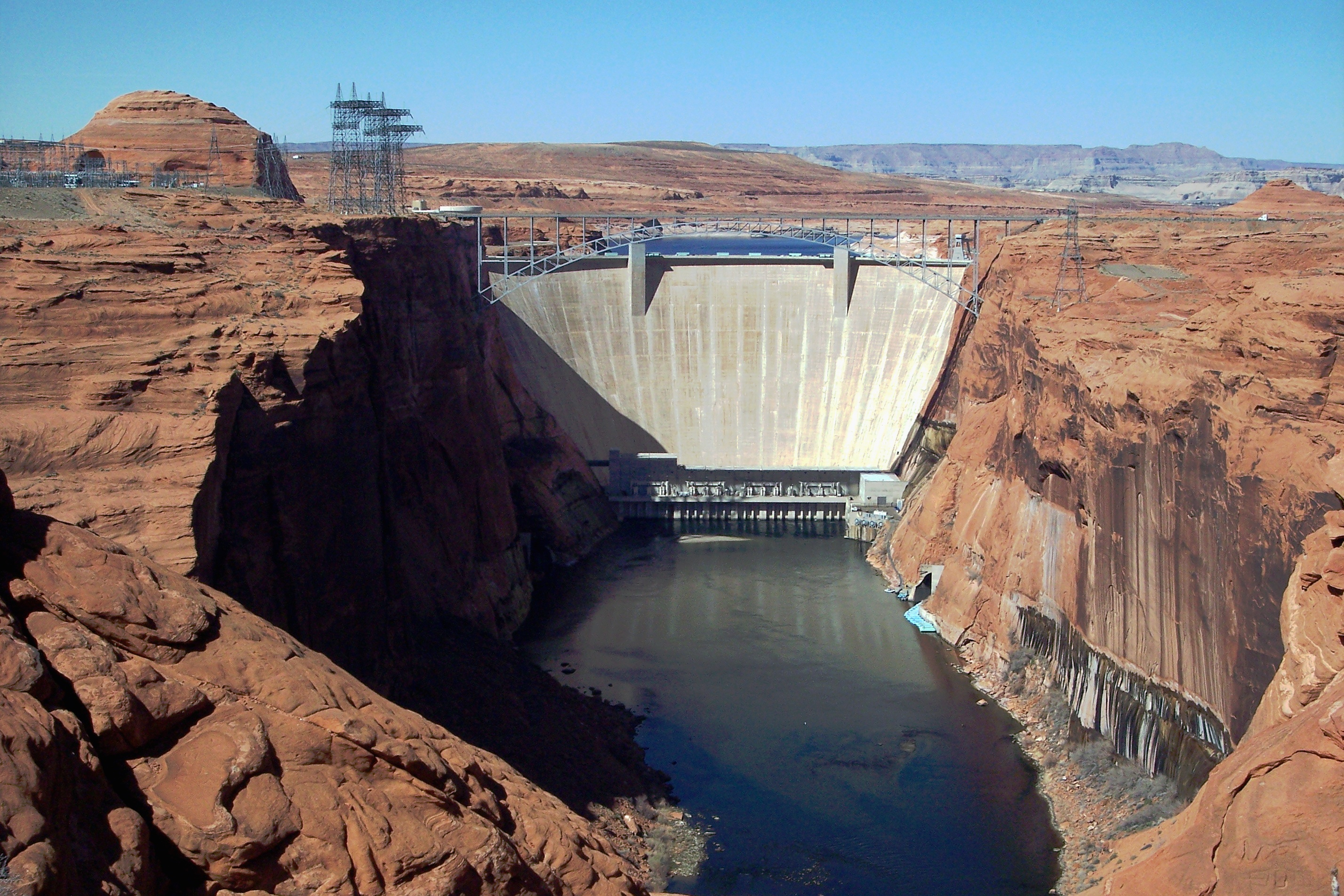
Abbey is critical of the industrial pressures on the desert, particularly the inundation of Glen Canyon as a result of the Glen Canyon Dam.

My God! I am thinking, what incredible shit we put up with most of our lives – the domestic routine (same old wife every night), the stupid and useless degrading jobs, the insufferable arrogance of elected officials, the crafty cheating and the slimy advertising of the business men, the tedious wars in which we kill our buddies instead of our real enemies back in the capital, the foul diseased and hideous cities and towns we live in, the constant petty tyranny of automatic washers and automobiles and TV machines and telephone!

Abbey displays disdain for the way industrialization is impacting the American wilderness. He scolds humanity for the environmental duress caused by man's blatant disregard for nature: "If industrial man, continues to multiply his numbers and expand his operations he will succeed in his apparent intention, to seal himself off from the natural, and isolate himself within a synthetic prison of his own making". Man prioritizes material items over nature, development and expansion for the sake of development:

There may be some among the readers of this book, like the earnest engineer, who believe without question that any and all forms of construction and development are intrinsic goods, in the national parks as well as anywhere else, who virtually identify quantity with quality and therefore assume that the greater the quantity of traffic, the higher the value received. There are some who frankly and boldly advocate the eradication of the last remnants of wilderness and the complete subjugation of nature to the requirements of – not man – but industry. This is a courageous view, admirable in its simplicity and power, and with the weight of all modern history behind it. It is also quite insane. I cannot attempt to deal with it here.

Another example of this for Abbey is the tragedy of the commons:

A civilization which destroys what little remains of the wild, the spare, the original, is cutting itself off from its origins and betraying the principle of civilization itself. If industrial man continues to multiply its numbers and expand his operations he will succeed in his apparent intention, to seal himself off from the natural and isolate himself within a synthetic prison of his own making. He will make himself an exile from the earth.

He also criticizes what he sees as the dominant social paradigm, what he calls the expansionist view, and the belief that technology will solve all our problems: "Confusing life expectancy with life-span, the gullible begin to believe that medical science has accomplished a miracle—lengthened human life!" Abbey takes this theme to an extreme at various points of the narrative, concluding that: "Wilderness preservations like a hundred other good causes will be forgotten under the overwhelming pressure, or a struggle for mere survival and sanity in a completely urbanized completely industrialized, ever more crowded environment, for my own part I would rather take my chances in a thermonuclear war than live in such a world".

=== Wilderness ===
Another major theme is the sanctity of untamed wilderness. Abbey states his dislike of the human agenda and presence by providing evidence of beauty that is beautiful simply because of its lack of human connection: "I want to be able to look at and into a juniper tree, a piece of quartz, a vulture, a spider, and see it as it is in itself, devoid of all humanly ascribed qualities, anti-Kantian, even the categories of scientific description. To meet God or Medusa face to face, even if it means risking everything human in myself." There is no hidden meaning in the wilderness for Abbey – he finds it beautiful because it is untainted by human perspectives and values. He also concludes that its inherent emptiness and meaninglessness serve as the ideal canvas for human philosophy absent the distractions of human contrivances and natural complexities. As such, Abbey wonders why natural monuments like mountains and oceans are mythologized and extolled much more than deserts. That emptiness is one of the defining aspects of the desert wildness and for Abbey one of its greatest assets – and one which humans have disturbed and harmed by their own presence:

I am almost prepared to believe that this sweet virginal primitive land would be grateful for my departure and the absence of the tourist, will breathe metaphorically a collective sigh of relief – like a whisper of wind – when we are all and finally gone and the place and its creations can return to their ancient procedures unobserved and undisturbed by the busy, anxious, brooding consciousness of man.

Midway through the text, Abbey observes that nature is something lost since before the time of our forefathers, something that has become distant and mysterious which he believes we should all come to know better: "Suppose we say that wilderness provokes nostalgia, a justified not merely sentimental nostalgia for the lost America our forefathers knew. The word suggests the past and the unknown, the womb of the earth from which we all emerged." He quite firmly believes that our agenda should change, that we need to reverse our path and reconnect with that something we have lost – indeed, that mankind and civilization need wilderness for its own edification. Abbey is not unaware, however, of the behaviour of his human kin; instead, he realizes that people have very different ideas about how to experience nature. Some like to live as much in accord with nature as possible, and others want to have both manmade comforts and a marvelous encounter with nature simultaneously: "Hard work. And risky. Too much for some, who have given up the struggle on the highways, in exchange for an entirely different kind of vacation – out in the open, on their own feet, following the quiet trail through forests and mountains, bedding down in the evening under the stars, when and where they feel like it, at a time where the Industrial Tourists are still hunting for a place to park their automobiles." His process simply suggests we do our best to be more on the side of being one with nature without the presence of objects which represent our "civilization". Abbey also was concerned with the level of human connection to the tools of civilization. He was in favor of returning to nature and gaining the freedom that was lost with the inventions that take us places in this day and age:

A man could be a lover and defender of the wilderness without ever in his lifetime leaving the boundaries of asphalt, power lines, and right-angled surfaces. We need wilderness whether or not we ever set foot in it. We need a refuge even though we may never need to go there. I may never in my life go to Alaska, for example, but I am grateful that it is there. We need the possibility of escape as surely as we need hope; without it the life of the cities would drive all men into crime or drugs or psychoanalysis.

The wilderness is equal to freedom for Abbey, it is what separates him from others and allows him to have his connection with the planet. But he wants others to have the same freedom. His only request is that they cut their strings first. When Abbey is lounging in his chair in 110-degree heat at Arches and observes that the mountains are snow-capped and crystal clear, it shows what nature provides: one extreme is able to counter another. That a median can be found, and that pleasure and comfort can be found between the rocks and hard places: "The knowledge that refuge is available, when and if needed, makes the silent inferno of the desert more easily bearable. Mountains complement desert as desert complements city, as wilderness complements and complete civilization." While wilderness may represent the philosophical "possibility of escape," Abbey also suggests that it could be a much more literal and political refuge: "Grand Canyon, Big Bend, Yellowstone and the High Sierras may be required to function as bases for guerrilla warfare against tyranny." He elaborates: "What reason have we Americans to think that our own society will necessarily escape the world-wide drift toward the totalitarian organization of men and institutions?" Concentrating people in cities, mechanizing agricultural production, limiting the rights of self-defense, and eliminating wilderness would be, among other governmental actions, an effective way to prepare a population for control by dictatorship.

Abbey makes statements that connect humanity to nature as a whole. He makes the acknowledgement that we came from the wilderness, we have lived by it, and we will return to it. This is an expression of loyalty: "But the love of wilderness is more than a hunger for what is always beyond reach; it is also an expression of loyalty to the earth which bore us and sustains us, the only home we shall ever know, the only paradise we ever need if only we had the eyes to see". He continues by saying that man is rightly obsessed with Mother Nature. It is where we came from, and something we still recognize as our starting point:

Standing there, gaping at this monstrous and inhuman spectacle of rock and cloud and sky and space, I feel a ridiculous greed and possessiveness come over me. I want to know it all, possess it all, embrace the entire scene intimately, deeply, totally, as a man desires a beautiful woman. An insane wish? Perhaps not – at least there's nothing else, no one human, to dispute possession with me.

Finally, Abbey suggests that man needs nature to sustain humanity: "No, wilderness is not a luxury but a necessity of the human spirit, and as vital to our lives as water and good bread."

== Bibliography ==
- Abbey, Edward (1968). Desert Solitaire. New York: McGraw-Hill.
- Abbey, Edward (1979). Abbey's Road. New York: Dutton. ISBN 052505006X.
- Abbey, Edward (1988). Desert Solitaire. Tucson: University of Arizona Press. ISBN 0816510571.
- Pozza, David M. (2006). Bedrock and Paradox: The Literary Landscape of Edward Abbey. New York: Peter Lang. ISBN 0820463302.
- Scheese, Don (1995). Nature Writing: The Pastoral Impulse in America. New York: Routledge. ISBN 0415938899.
