= Weltschmerz =

German word for deep sadness about the state of the world

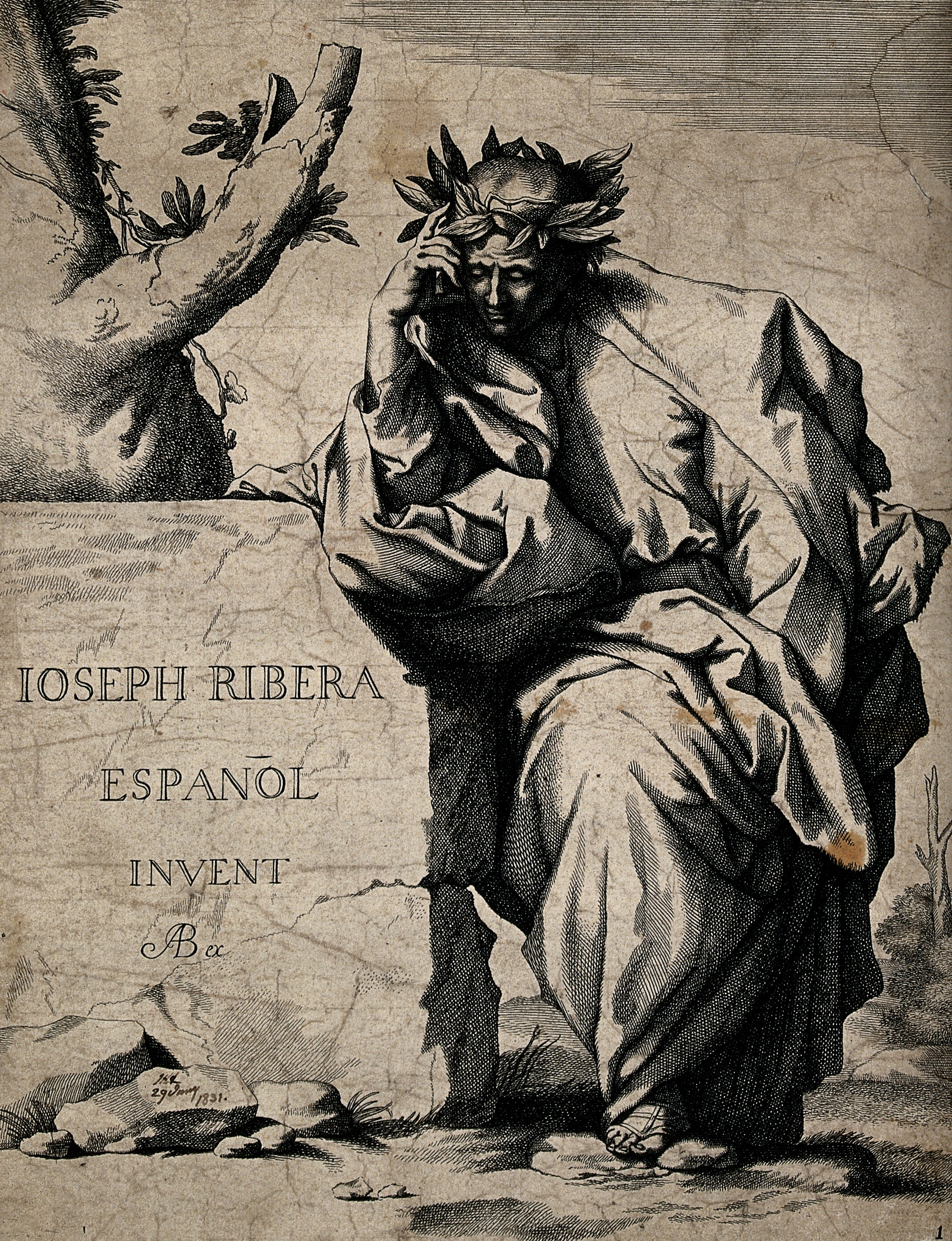
Engraving by Jusepe de Ribera depicting the melancholic and world-weary figure of a poet

Weltschmerz (German: [ˈvɛltʃmɛɐ̯ts]; literally "world-pain") is a literary concept describing the refusal or incapacity to accept the world as it is, creating a deep sadness at the state of the world. It results in "a mood of weariness or sadness about life arising from the acute awareness of evil and suffering".

The term was coined by the German Romantic author Jean Paul in his 1827 novel Selina. In its original definition in the Deutsches Wörterbuch by the Brothers Grimm, it denotes a deep sadness about the insufficiency of the world ("tiefe Traurigkeit über die Unzulänglichkeit der Welt"). The translation can differ depending on context; in reference to the self, it can mean "world-weariness", while in reference to the world, it can mean "the pain of the world". The term was created to describe the melancholy typically defining the Romantic movement.

The worldview of Weltschmerz has been seen as widespread among Romantic and decadent authors such as Jean Paul, the Marquis de Sade, Lord Byron, Giacomo Leopardi, William Blake, Charles Baudelaire, Paul Verlaine, François-René de Chateaubriand, Oscar Wilde, Alfred de Musset, Mikhail Lermontov, Nikolaus Lenau, Hermann Hesse, and Heinrich Heine.

== Further examples ==
The modern meaning of Weltschmerz in the German language is the psychological pain caused by sadness that can occur when realising that someone's own weaknesses are caused by the inappropriateness and cruelty of the world and (physical and social) circumstances.

In Tropic of Cancer, Henry Miller describes an acquaintance, "Moldorf", who has prescriptions for Weltschmerz on scraps of paper in his pocket. John Steinbeck wrote about this feeling in two of his novels; in East of Eden, Samuel Hamilton feels it after meeting Cathy Trask for the first time, where it is referred to as the Welshrats, it is also mentioned in The Winter of our Discontent. Ralph Ellison uses the term in Invisible Man with regard to the pathos inherent in the singing of spirituals: "Beneath the swiftness of the hot tempo there was a slower tempo and a cave and I entered it and looked around and heard an old woman singing a spiritual as full of Weltschmerz as flamenco". Kurt Vonnegut references the feeling in his novel Player Piano, in which it is felt by Doctor Paul Proteus and his father. In John D. MacDonald's novel Free Fall in Crimson, Travis McGee describes Weltschmerz as "homesickness for a place you have never seen". In Edward Abbey's novel The Fool's Progress, page 243 discusses protagonist Henry Lightcap's despair and "the Weltschmerz of Europe", amongst other depressing and gloomy states of the world. In 2020, Scottish singer Fish released his final studio album Weltschmerz. He said, "It’s been over five years since I first came up with the title which is a German word that translates to ‘world weariness’ or ‘world pain’. In this present day and age never has an album title become so apt."

== In Popular Culture ==
The word is discussed in Season 3 Episode 11 (The Maternal Congruence) of The Big Bang Theory. Sheldon attempts to comfort Leonard, who is having difficulty in his relationship with his mother.

== See also ==
- Acedia
- Duḥkha
- Gnosticism
- Lacrimae rerum
- Mal du siècle
- Mono no aware
- Philosophical pessimism
- Nihilism
- Saudade
- Sehnsucht
- Solastalgia
- Sturm und Drang
- Ubi sunt
