= The Brave Cowboy =

1956 novel by Edward Abbey

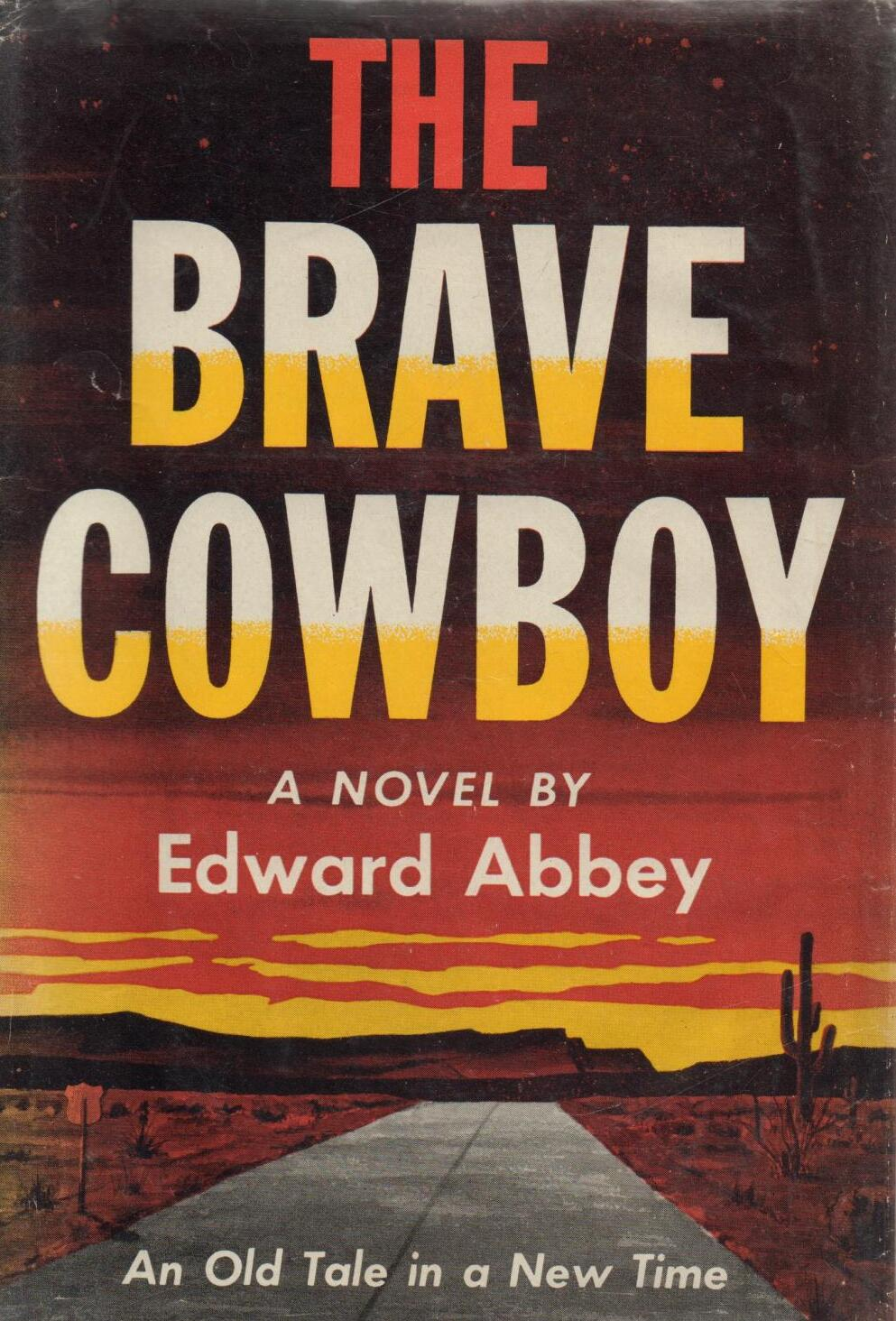
- First edition
- Author: Edward Abbey
- Language: English
- Genre: Western novel
- Publisher: Dodd, Mead and Company
- Publication date: 1956
- Publication place: United States
- Media type: Print (hardcover, paperback)
- Pages: 277 pp
- ISBN: 0826304486
- OCLC: 3090133
- Dewey Decimal: 813/.5/4
- LC Class: PZ4.A124 Br7 PS3551.B2

The Brave Cowboy (1956) was Edward Abbey's second published novel.

In 1993 Dream Garden Press produced a special limited edition of the book that includes an introduction by Kirk Douglas, who starred in the film based on the book. It also includes photos from the film. Douglas signed 500 copies of that special edition. The song "The Brave Cowboy" by Dale Brittain is ostensibly inspired by Abbey's novel, with a protagonist who appears to share in the philosophy and predicament of Jack Burns, but whose name is never explicitly mentioned.

== Plot summary ==
This book is the story of a cowboy, Jack Burns, who lives as a transient worker and roaming ranch hand much as the cowboys of old did, and refuses to join modern society. He rejects much of modern technology, prefers to cut down any fence he comes across, will not carry any kind of modern identification such as a driver's license or Social Security card, and refuses to register for the draft. When his friend Paul Bondi, who is a philosophical anarchist, is jailed in Albuquerque, New Mexico, for refusing to register for the draft, Burns deliberately gets himself arrested in an attempt to break his friend out of jail, but winds up on the run from the law himself.

Bondi has been tried and is awaiting transport from county jail to federal prison but refuses to escape with Burns. As police have discovered that Burns has also never registered for the draft, authorities are intent on sending Burns to trial and eventually federal prison for violation of the Selective Service Act of 1948. Burns eventually escapes reluctantly leaving his friend behind. After a brief stop to say goodbye to Paul's wife, Jerry, and son, Seth, Jack heads into the Sandia Mountains, just east of Albuquerque, on horseback.

The police mount a manhunt and pull out all the stops to capture Burns, including helicopters on loan by the Air Force. If Burns can scale the mountain range, he figures he can escape under the cover of the forest on the other side. The police know this as well, so they position themselves to prevent that from happening.

== Links to other work ==
Many casual fans of Abbey might consider George Washington Hayduke the author's favorite character, but it was John W. "Jack" Burns whom Abbey kept writing about. Burns is introduced in The Brave Cowboy. He is also a major character in Abbey's science fiction novel Good News. Burns makes cameo appearances in both The Monkey Wrench Gang and Hayduke Lives!.

The Brave Cowboy also contains elements of future books, though the relationship between them is unclear. Burns is the grandson of Henry Vogelin, whose ranch Burns spent time on as a child. The ranch, currently in the hands of the US Air Force is part of a base commanded by General DeSalius. Vogelin and DeSalius will be characters six years later in Abbey's 1962 work Fire on the Mountain, the story of a boy from the East Coast who visits his grandfather's ranch and falls in love with the desert and ranch life just in time to see both destroyed by development. However, Burns's time on the ranch is well detailed in Brave Cowboy and the only characters the stories share are Vogelin and DeSalius. Though the book is written as a memoir, Jack seems too old to have been the boy staying on the ranch at the moment of dispossession. Having written Fire On The Mountain after The Brave Cowboy, Abbey chose to write about the child "Billy" rejecting the option of using the novel to explain the past of Jack Burns. Yet it is still possible that the novels are directly linked, as the number of Vogelin's children is never revealed. Jack and Billy may be cousins or brothers, and the Vogelin and ranch in question may indeed be the same in both novels.

== Publication ==
The first edition of the book is considered the rarest of Abbey's eight novels. There was only one printing of 5,000 copies, and many of them have not survived. One online rare book dealer shows that copies of the first U.S. edition start at $4,000 and the highest asking price is $10,000.

== Film version ==
Kirk Douglas gave the film version of The Brave Cowboy the title Lonely Are the Brave, his personal favorite. It was adapted by Academy Award-winning—and formerly blacklisted—screenwriter Dalton Trumbo. Released in 1962, it is one of only two films made based on Abbey's novels. British writer/director/actor Alex Cox has lauded the film, writing that "there is no greater western, and certainly no more tragic one."

The second Abbey adaptation was Fire on the Mountain, which was a made-for-TV movie that starred Ron Howard and Buddy Ebsen. A third film, based on Abbey's most popular novel, The Monkey Wrench Gang, is currently in development. Catherine Hardwicke is scheduled to direct the film.
