= George Hayduke (author) =

Pseudonymous American humorist

- Occupation: Writer
- Writing career
- Genre: Humor
- Notable work: Get Even : The Complete Book of Dirty Tricks

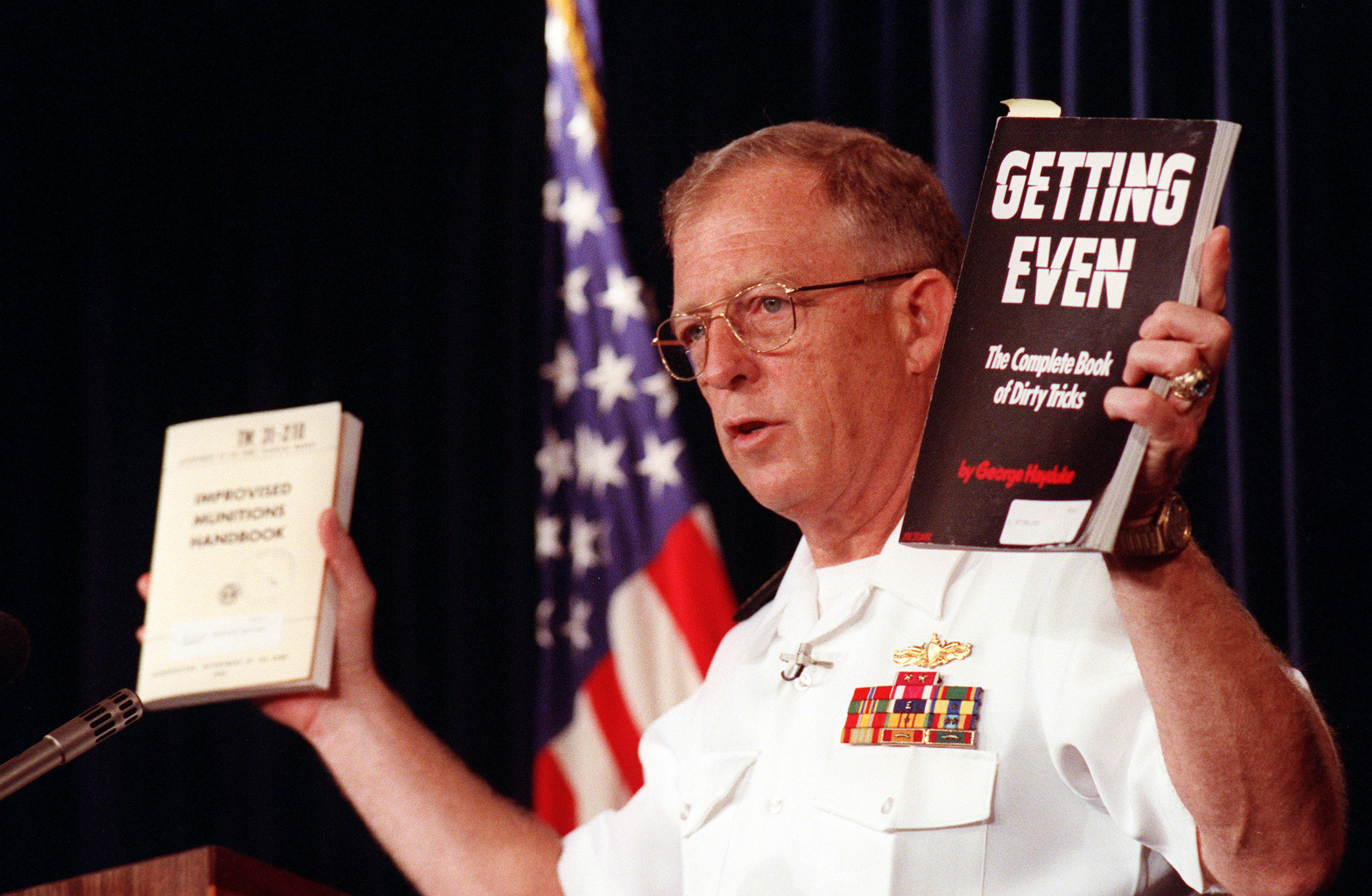
Hayduke's book Getting Even (right), held up by Rear Admiral Richard D. Milligan at a press conference concerning the 1989 USS Iowa turret explosion

George Hayduke is the pen name of a prolific anonymous author of prank books. The name is believed to be based on the character George Washington Hayduke III, created by Edward Abbey in his 1975 book The Monkey Wrench Gang, and 1990 book Hayduke Lives!. Often in collaboration with perhaps equally pseudonymous co-author M. Nelson Chunder, Hayduke has authored numerous guides to pranks and practical jokes, primarily intended for vengeance. Activities suggested range from the merely annoying and mischievous to the illegal and extremely dangerous. Hayduke's book Getting Even: The Complete Book of Dirty Tricks was found in the locker of a man accused of the USS Iowa turret explosion, which killed 47 people.

== Works ==
Title	Year	Pages
Don't Get Mad, Get Even: The Big Book of Revenge	2006	310
The Second Amendment Revenge Book: Hayduke's Guide to Getting the Gun Grabbers	2003	184
The Big Book of Revenge: 200 Dirty Tricks for Those Who Are Serious About Getting Even	2001	231
Byte Me!: Hayduke's Guide to Computer-Generated Revenge	2000	154
Revenge is Sweet: Dozens of Wicked Ways to Have the Last Laugh	1997	144
Silent But Deadly: More Homemade Silencers from Hayduke the Master	1995	88
Revenge Techniques from the Master of Mayhem	1994	
Righteous Revenge	1993	229
Hardcore Hayduke: More Down-And-Dirty Revenge Techniques	1993	
Mayhem!: More from the Master of Malice	1992	
Advanced Backstabbing and Mudslinging Techniques	1991	
Sweet Revenge: A Serious Guide to Retribution (previously published as I Hate You, c1983)	1989	
Payback: Advanced Backstabbing and Mudslinging Techniques	1989	
The Hayduke Silencer Book: Quick and Dirty Homemade Silencers	1989	
George Hayduke's Kickass!: More Mayhem from the Master of Malice	1988	
Make My Day!: Hayduke's Best Revenge Techniques for the Punks in Your Life	1987	224
Screw Unto Others: Revenge Tactics for All Occasions	1986	248
Make 'em Pay!: Ultimate Revenge Techniques from the Master Trickster	1986	
Revenge!	1984	
Getting Even 2	1983	
Up Yours!: Guide to Advanced Revenge Techniques	1982	
Getting Even 2: More Dirty Tricks from the Master of Revenge	1981	170
Getting Even: The Complete Book of Dirty Tricks	1980	208
