= Jonathan Troy =

1954 novel by Edward Abbey

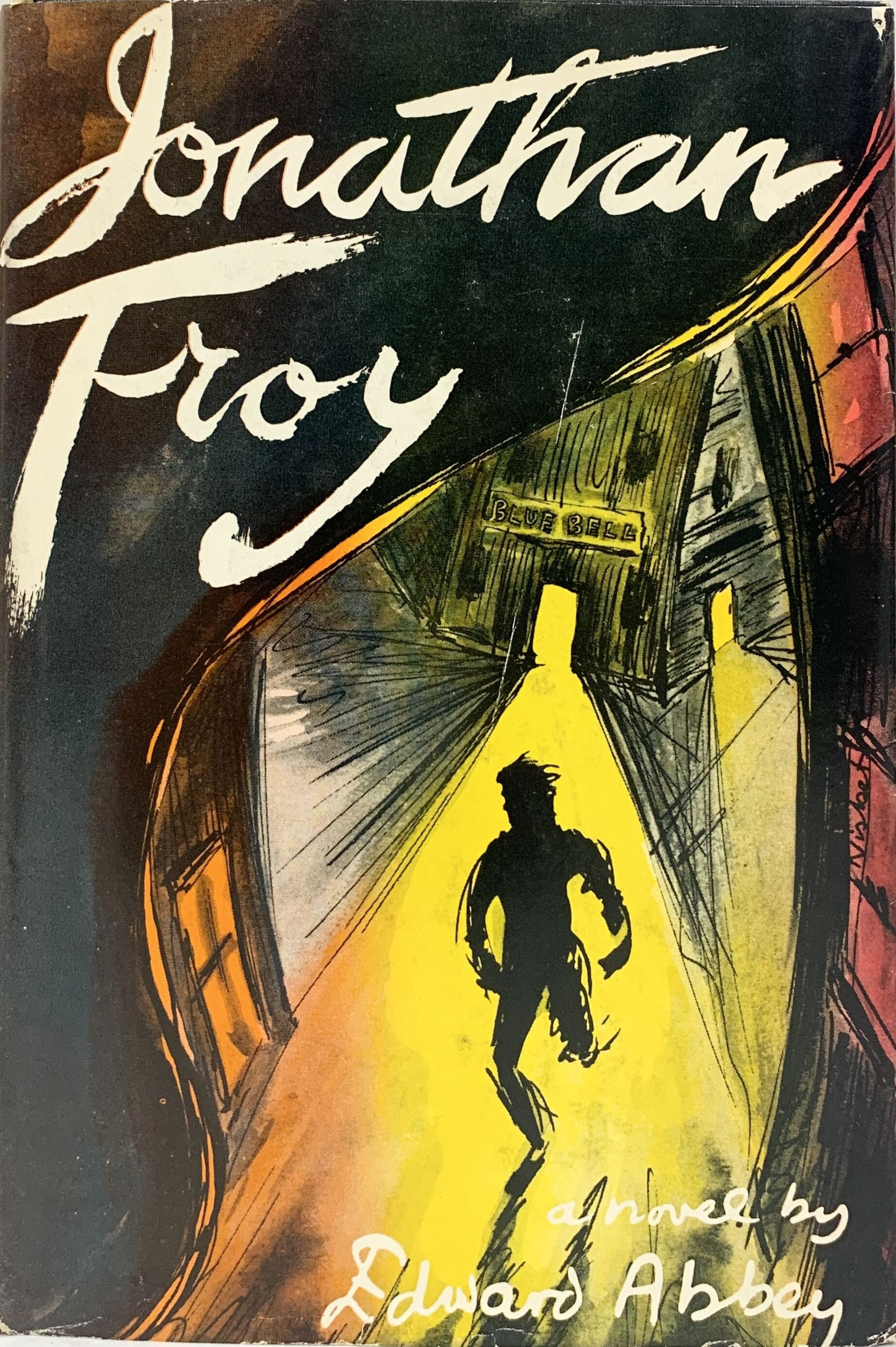
- First edition
- Author: Edward Abbey
- Language: English
- Genre: Western
- Publisher: Dodd, Mead and Company
- Publication date: 1954
- Publication place: United States
- Media type: Print (hardback, paperback)
- Pages: 374
- Followed by: Fire on the Mountain

Jonathan Troy (1954) was Edward Abbey's first published novel. Only 5,000 copies were printed, and almost immediately after it was released, the author wanted to disown the work. He asked that it never be published again, and it has not been, making it very rare and the only one of his eight novels that many Abbey fans have not read.

When a fan once asked where they could find a copy of the novel, Abbey is reported to have told them "I don't know where you can find one, but if you do, burn it." Copies of the book offered for sale online start at $1,300 and go up to $7,500.

Abbey's disgust with the novel was immediate. According to James M. Cahalan's biography, Edward Abbey, A Life, he could barely get through the galleys before the book was published. He said it seemed "even worse than I had thought," too "juvenile, naive, succeeded in almost nothing. Too much empty rhetoric, not enough meat and bone. Not convincing. All the obvious faults of the beginner."

In 1984 Abbey was quoted by William Plummer in "Edward Abbey's Desert Solecisms" as saying that Jonathan Troy "was a disgusting novel, fortunately long out of print. ... It's about the agonies of growing up in a small town: pimples and masturbation. There's a Faulkner chapter, an entire chapter in one sentence ... There's a Thomas Wolfe wind-through-the-trees-outside-the-farmhouse chapter, a Joyce chapter, and of course there are newspaper clips all through the thing, like in Dos Passos's Nineteen Nineteen."

This is the only one of Abbey's eight novels that was set entirely east of the Mississippi River and away from his beloved deserts of the Southwestern United States. He does spend a good portion of The Fool's Progress in West Virginia, but it starts in Tucson and then follows a road trip to its climax.

== Background ==
In high school Abbey kept a journal and often used the moniker "Jonathan Troy" to refer to himself. While the book is not autobiographical, it was not well received by people who had known Abbey during his senior year of high school. The contempt Jonathan shows for the residents of his home town was a hard blow to people Abbey knew in high school, a fact that may have had something to do with Abbey's later regret at having published this book.

Still, as with his later novels, the book contains more fiction than fact. For example, in the book, Jonathan lives alone with his one-eyed father. In real life, both of Abbey's parents were living and his father had two perfectly good eyes.

According to the back of the jacket, Abbey began writing this book as a creative writing assignment at the University of New Mexico in Albuquerque under the sponsorship of Professor C.V. Wicker. After receiving his B.A. degree in 1951, Abbey spent a year at the University of Edinburgh. It was there that the greater part of Jonathan Troy was completed.

== Plot summary ==
Many of the other characters in the book refer to Jonathan Troy as the golden boy. He is a senior at the local high school and they call him that because he has everything: Looks, intelligence and talent. However, he is not an easy character for the reader to like. The reader is given an insight into the mind of a teenage boy, where he holds nearly everyone he meets in contempt—especially his father, Nathaniel, and his favorite teacher, Feathersmith.

The book is written as a series of different events, almost none of them related. Jonathan has had an ongoing relationship with one girl, Etheline. Once he finally succeeds in seducing her, he begins to lose interest, especially when she starts talking about marriage. A chance meeting with a new girl in town, Leafy, gives him new inspiration and he begins pursuit of her.

Abbey also introduces the only major gay character in any of his eight novels, Phillip Feathersmith. Abbey does not explicitly say that he's gay, but he describes his "fairy-flower" hands and talks about what a pink little fellow he is. Jonathan calls him "Fairysmith" in his own mind. Feathersmith shows an attraction to Jonathan that is not very subtle.

Most of the story is set in a western Pennsylvania town called Powhattan. It was actually based on the town near where Abbey grew up, Indiana, Pennsylvania. Abbey even uses some of the names of businesses in Indiana in the 1940s for his story. The Blue Star Restaurant becomes the Blue Bell Bar that is the business under the apartment Jonathan Troy shares with his father.

There are many hints of the greatness Abbey would fine tune in his later works, including his love of the desert (Jonathan longs to go there); his deep passion for women and beer; and above all his sense of humor.

One of the books characters in the book is Fatgut, a pathological liar who Jonathan seems close to.

The key secondary character of the story is Jonathan's father, Nathaniel Troy. He is a Communist living in 1950s America, right about the time of the Red Scare. He receives almost daily threats to his well-being. Jonathan avoids his father as much as possible, living a mostly independent life. But the climax of the story comes when some town drunks decide they're going to make the Communist kiss the American flag.

Another character in the novel is Red Ginter, who would also be a character in The Fool's Progress. In this book, Ginter is the neighborhood bully who has tormented Jonathan most of his life. In the latter book, he's a member of a baseball team who hits the game-winning home run, but then refuses to run the bases.

There was a real person named Earl "Red" Ginter who was part of Abbey's early life and seems to be the inspiration for these characters.

There is no nobility in Jonathan Troy. Having access to his thoughts kills any affection you might be able to muster. He's rude to nearly everyone he meets, especially his father. Once he's had sex with Etheline, he looks at her again with fresh perspective and decides he hates her body. And when given an opportunity to stand up for something noble, Jonathan usually turns and heads in the other direction.

One of the techniques Abbey uses in this book is devote a few chapters to printing notices in the local newspaper. It provides a slice of small-town life and in at least one case, relates to the plot.

== Characters ==
- Jonathan Troy – High school senior and 19-year-old who longs to leave this small town behind and get to the desert. He's very rude to nearly everyone he meets, especially his father.
- Nathaniel Troy – A union organizer for Industrial Workers of the World and a Communist. He wears a patch over his left eye to hide the empty eye socket. He lives under constant threats to his well-being.
- Lafilia "Leafy" Hollister – The new girl in town who Jonathan falls in love with. She's the only woman in the book Jonathan shows any real respect to.
- Etheline Glyson – Jonathan's girlfriend at the start of the story. He's in love with her body but believes she has nothing going on inside her mind.
- Phillip Feathersmith – Jonathan's teacher and director of the school play. He appears to be gay (at least Jonathan thinks so). He is constantly trying to help Jonathan mend his relationship with his father.
- Leibert B. Pitch – Another teacher who is usually hanging around Feathersmith and Jonathan. While Feathersmith usually defends Nathaniel Troy, Pitch is against it. "He doesn't care about anything. And I like him," Jonathan thinks.
- Dominic "Fatgut" Panetelli – A co-conspirator of Jonathan's and a pathological liar. The two of them engage in petty crimes. Fatgut, so named because he's overweight, constantly lies to Jonathan about how great his life is, but when challenged makes up excuses why he can't back up any of his statements.
- Captain Billy T. Greene – Chief of the local Salvation Army Band who tries to warn Nathaniel Troy that his activities will likely get him into trouble. In one scene he debates Nat over the virtues of this world vs. the next world.
- Vincent Stakura – Bartender at the Blue Bell Bar. He has a gimmick with every regular customer he uses whenever he serves them a drink. With Jonathan, he stares at him. With Feathersmith, he pinches him lightly on his nose.
- Harry Friedmann – A college professor and friend of Feathersmith. When Jonathan meets him for the first time, he thinks, "another one," suggesting he's also gay.
- Mary Ann Potter – Waitress, an older woman, at Danny's Diner who flirts with Jonathan whenever he visits.
- The Sergeant – Police sergeant who tries to warn Jonathan to get his father to back down on the union organizing and speaking about socialist causes.
- Pansy Mae Sepparton – A student in Feathersmith's English class.
- Ruth Ellen McAlfee – Another student. She plays Lady Macbeth in the play that Jonathan stars in.
- Red Ginter – A bully who tormented Jonathan when he was young because he was older and bigger and could get away with it. Now that Jonathan is older, he wants revenge on the boy, who is usually working on the family farm.
- Jack Garden – The football player at the school Leafy is dating when Jonathan tracks them down in a car chase so that he can introduce himself to Leafy. They end up in a fight.
- Johnny Woodring; Buddy Henesy and Ralph Stadtmiller – Childhood friends of Jonathan who team up with him in a plot to get their revenge on the bully, Red Ginter.
- Hankerson boys – Two friends of Red Ginter who help him bully the younger kids in the neighborhood.
- Man with the flag – A bully at the Blue Bell Bar who decides he wants all the suspected Communists to show their loyalty to America by kissing the flag.
