= The Fool's Progress =

1988 novel by Edward Abbey

The Fool's Progress: An Honest Novel
- First edition
- Author: Edward Abbey
- Language: English
- Genre: Anarchist
- Publisher: Henry Holt & Co.
- Publication date: 1988
- Publication place: United States
- Media type: Print (hardback & paperback)
- Pages: 485 pp
- ISBN: 0805009213

The Fool's Progress is a novel written by American author Edward Abbey (1927–1989), published in 1988.

The book is a semi-autobiographical novel about a man, Henry Holyoak Lightcap, who refuses to submit to modern commercial society. Unlike Abbey's most famous fiction work, The Monkey Wrench Gang, which concerns the use of sabotage to protest environmentally damaging activities in the American Southwest, The Fool's Progress focuses on the journey of Henry across America. Edward Abbey considered it to be his "fat masterpiece." It was the final book published in his lifetime; his final novel was Hayduke Lives!.

== Plot ==
After Henry Lightcap's third wife storms out of the house and his life, boozing, misanthropic anarchist Lightcap shoots his refrigerator and decides to drive across the country journeying to his childhood home in West Virginia. The chapters alternate between his current journey and significant historical vignettes that shed light on his eccentric beginnings.

== Reception ==
In a review for The New York Times, Howard Coale said it was "a particularly self-involved novel" and while praising the sentimental moments of the book, he notes "Unfortunately they are drowned out to almost a murmur by the harpings of a slightly malevolent and self-indulgent voice." Genaro Gonzalez, writing for the Los Angeles Times, gave it "an eager recommendation" Publishers Weekly gave it a positive review calling it "an epic exploration of Abbey's passionate loves and hatreds."
