= Doug Peacock =

American author, filmmaker, wildlife activist, and Vietnam War veteran

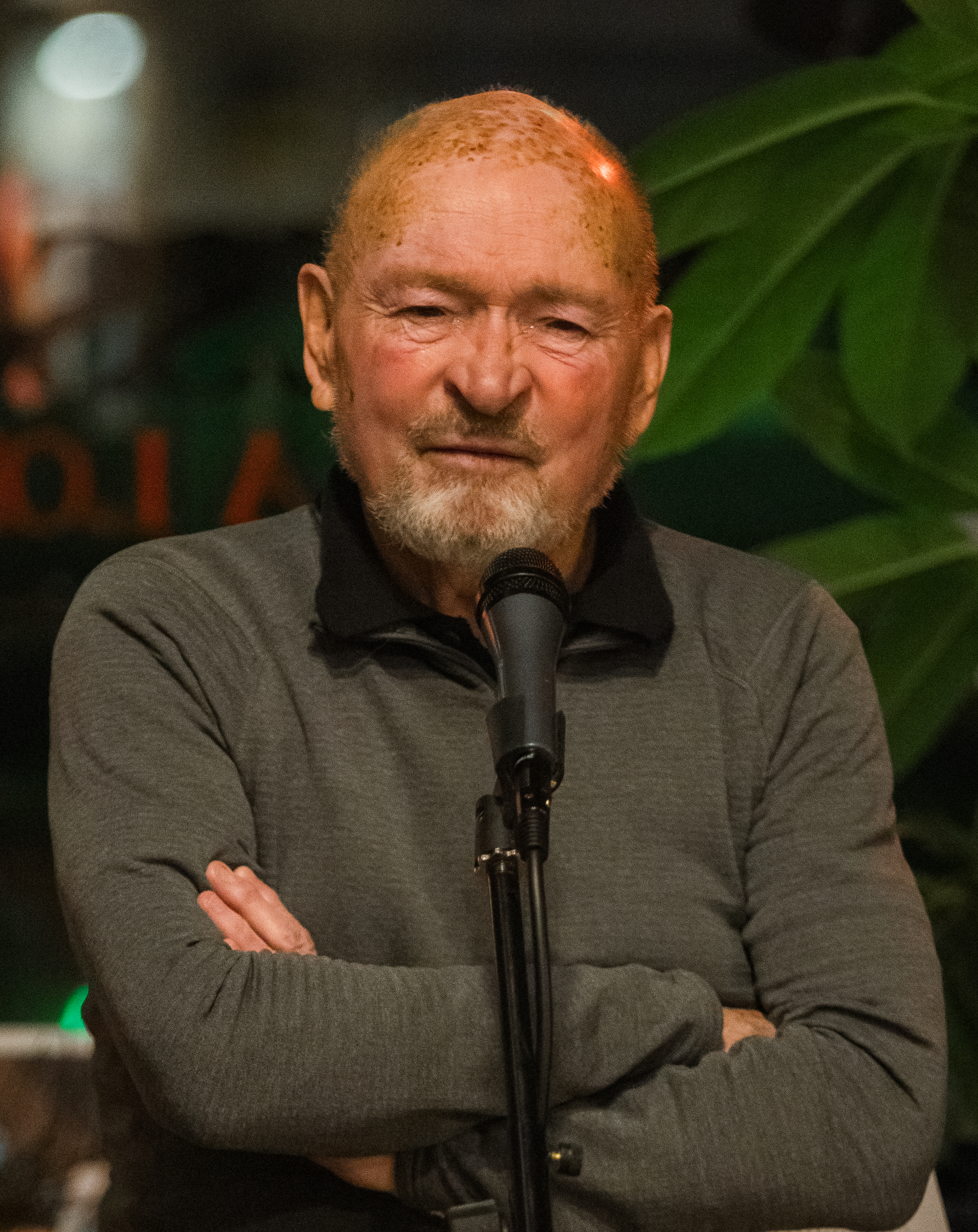
Peacock at a speaking engagement in 2021

Doug Peacock (born April 5, 1942) is an American author, filmmaker, wildlife activist, and Vietnam War veteran. He is best known for his work dedicated to grizzly bear recovery in the lower-48, his book Grizzly Years: In Search of the American Wilderness and serving as the model for the well-known character George Washington Hayduke in Edward Abbey's novel The Monkey Wrench Gang. Doug is the co-founder of several conservation organizations including Round River Conservation Studies, Save The Yellowstone Grizzly, and Grizzly Guardians.

In 1988, the award winning documentary Peacock's War was released about Doug's experiences in Vietnam and his efforts to study and protect grizzly bears. Peacock's War premiered on PBS Nature, Channel 4 London, and the Discovery Channel. In 2019, Doug starred in a film called Grizzly Country, a follow-up documentary devoted to Doug's then-and-now war experiences and the evolution of his work with grizzly bears. Grizzly Country was published by The Atlantic Selects, an online showcase of short documentaries curated by The Atlantic. Doug's 2021, film The Beast of Our Time: Grizzly Bears and Climate Change, narrated by Jeff Bridges and scored by Bill Payne, has already won multiple awards and is currently being screened at environmental film festivals nationwide.

Peacock was a 2022, award winner in literature from the American Academy of Arts and Letters, named a 2007 Guggenheim Fellow and was awarded the Cultural Freedom Fellowship by the Lannan Foundation in 2011 for his work on archaeology, climate change and the peopling of North America as published in his 2013 book In the Shadow of the Sabertooth: A Renegade Naturalist Considers Global Warming, the Arrival of the First Americans and the Terrible Beasts of the Pleistocene (Counterpunch/AK Press).

He is an ally of many environmentalists and authors—including Terry Tempest Williams, Yvon Chouinard, Doug Tompkins, Rick Ridgeway and Edward Abbey—Peacock has devoted his life to advocating for this planet's wildlife and ecosystems.

== Biography ==
Doug Peacock, the son of seasoned naturalists and birders Marion E. and Kathryn L. Peacock, was born in Alma, Michigan where he grew up in the woods, swamps, and trout streams of northern Michigan. He attended the University of Michigan where he brought Martin Luther King Jr. to campus and earned a degree in geology. Doug then served two tours in the Vietnam War as a Green Beret combat medic; he was awarded the Soldier's Medal, the Vietnamese Cross of Gallantry, and the Bronze Star.

Upon returning home from war, Doug felt disillusioned with human society and sought solace in the beauty of the wilderness. Although he had little scientific background, his passion for and firsthand experience with bears soon brought him recognition as an expert in grizzly behavior. Peacock wrote Grizzly Years: In Search of the American Wilderness in the 70s and 80s. He was a close friend of author Edward Abbey, and served as the model for the character George Hayduke in Abbey's novel The Monkey Wrench Gang.

Peacock's 2005 book, Walking it Off: A Veteran's Chronicle of War And Wilderness, continues his memoirs, in the wake of Ed Abbey's death. He ventured into the southwest deserts to walk off the scars left by his friend's death. In the process, he revisited Vietnam in flashbacks, remembering the cantankerous friendship with Abbey, and almost died in his journey to recover from "this terminal disease called life" in Nepal with his friends Alan Burgess and Dennis Sizemore.

Peacock was a 2007 Guggenheim fellow, and currently lives in Montana with his wife Andrea, author of Libby, Montana: Asbestos and the Deadly Silence of an American Corporation. Peacock speaks in schools about wilderness, conservation, and the need to preserve our wilderness.

Doug and Andrea Peacock's book, The Essential Grizzly: The Mingled Fates of Men and Bears was released on May 1, 2006 (Lyons Press, ISBN 1-59228-848-0). It has been reissued in paperback under a new title, In the Presence of Grizzlies: The Ancient Bond Between Men and Bears in March 2009. (Lyons Press, ISBN 1-59921-490-3)

Peacock served as a writer for the Daily Beast, where he writes about the American wilderness as well as animal rights in their indigenous lands. He wrote for The Daily Beast from 2014 through 2019.

He most recently published in Alta Magazine on current threats to wilderness.

== Books ==
- Peacock, Doug. Grizzly Years: In Search of the American Wilderness, Henry Holt & Co., 1990 (ISBN 0-8050-0448-3).
- Peacock, Doug. Baja, Bulfinch Press, 1991 (ISBN 0821218034).
- Peacock, Doug. Walking It Off: A Veteran's Chronicle of War And Wilderness, Ewu Press, 2005 (ISBN 0-910055-99-8).
- Peacock, Doug and Edward Abbey. "The Best of Edward Abbey", Sierra Club Books, 2005 (ISBN 1578051215).
- Peacock, Doug and Andrea Peacock. The Essential Grizzly: The Mingled Fates of Men and Bears, Lyons Press, 2006 (ISBN 1-59228-848-0).
- Peacock, Doug. In the Shadow of the Sabertooth: A Renegade Naturalist Considers Global Warming, the First Americans, and the Terrible Beasts of the Pleistocene. AK Press, 2013 (ISBN 978-1-84935-140-9).
- Peacock, Doug. Was It Worth It? A Wilderness Warrior's Long Trail Home, Patagonia Works, 2022 (ISBN 978-1-952338-04-5).
