= Lonely Are the Brave =

1962 US Western film by David Miller

- Theatrical poster
- Directed by: David Miller
- Screenplay by: Dalton Trumbo
- Based on: The Brave Cowboy; 1956 novel by Edward Abbey
- Produced by: Edward Lewis
- Starring: Kirk Douglas; Gena Rowlands; Walter Matthau; Michael Kane; Carroll O'Connor; William Schallert
- Cinematography: Philip H. Lathrop
- Edited by: Leon Barsha
- Music by: Jerry Goldsmith
- Color process: Black and white
- Production company: Joel Productions
- Distributed by: Universal Pictures
- Release date: May 24, 1962 (Houston)
- Running time: 107 minutes
- Country: United States
- Language: English
- Budget: $2 million

Lonely Are the Brave is a 1962 American black and white neo-Western film directed by David Miller and written by Dalton Trumbo, who adapted his screenplay from the 1956 Edward Abbey novel The Brave Cowboy. It stars Kirk Douglas, Gena Rowlands and Walter Matthau.

Kirk Douglas plays Jack Burns, a cowboy, Gena Rowlands portrays his best friend's wife, and Walter Matthau appears as a sheriff who sympathizes with Burns but must do his job and chase him down. The picture also features an early score by composer Jerry Goldsmith. Douglas repeatedly said that this was his favorite film of his own work.

== Plot ==
John W. "Jack" Burns works as a roaming ranch hand with his horse Whiskey. He carries no identification and has no home address because he just sleeps wherever he finds a place.

One day as Burns crosses a highway into town, his horse has a difficult time crossing the road, scared by the traffic. Once over the highway, they visit Jerry, the wife of old friend Paul Bondi, who has been jailed for giving aid to illegal immigrants.

To break Bondi out of jail, Burns decides to get himself arrested. After a barroom fight against a one-armed man, in which he too must use only one arm, he is arrested. When the police let him go, he deliberately punches a cop to get put in jail. Bondi is pleased to see him, and Burns defends him from the attention of bullying Deputy Sheriff Gutierrez. At night, the inmates saw through one of the jail's bars using hacksaw blades that Burns had hidden in one of his boots. Gutierrez summons Burns in the middle of the night and beats him. Burns loses a tooth, which he pockets. He cannot get Bondi to escape with him as Bondi has accepted his two-year sentence; his family means he has too much at stake to risk becoming a fugitive, which carries a five-year term.

Burns breaks out by himself, returning to Bondi's house, where he picks up his horse and some food from Jerry. They talk about what might have been, and he acknowledges he could never have loved her like Bondi does; he never wanted to settle down. He asks for a kiss to give him the energy to reach the mountains, and they kiss.

After the jailbreak, the sheriff learns that Burns served in the military during the Korean War, including seven months in a disciplinary training center for striking a superior officer. He also received a Purple Heart and a Distinguished Service Cross for valor during battle. This gives the sheriff some sympathy for Burns.

Burns heads for the mountains, with the goal of crossing the border into Mexico. The police mount an extensive search, with Sheriff Johnson and Deputy Sheriff Harry searching in a jeep. A military helicopter is brought in when the Air Force ask to be allowed to give their pilots some search 'practice'. The aircrew locate Burns and relay his location to the sheriff. Whiskey is repeatedly spooked by the helicopter, so Burns shoots the tail rotor, causing the pilot to crash land.

Deputy Gutierrez is on foot chasing Burns. He sees the horse on a corner and raises his gun, telling Burns to show himself, but Burns is behind him and knocks him over. He throws away Gutierrez's weapons and leaves his tooth in Gutierrez's pocket. Burns surmounts the crest of the Sandia Mountains and escapes into a broad stand of heavy timber.

He then tries to cross Highway 66 in Tijeras Canyon during a heavy rainstorm, but Whiskey is spooked and blinded by the lights. A truck driver strikes Burns and Whiskey, hurling them to the side of the road. The sheriff arrives and, when asked by the state police if Burns is the man he has been looking for, says he cannot confidently identify him because he has never seen the man up close. Whiskey is shot (put down), and a shocked Burns is taken away in an ambulance.

== Cast ==
- Kirk Douglas as John W. "Jack" Burns
- Gena Rowlands as Jerry Bondi
- Walter Matthau as Sheriff Morey Johnson
- Michael Kane as Paul Bondi
- Carroll O'Connor as Truck Driver
- William Schallert as Harry (Johnson's deputy)
- George Kennedy as Gutierrez (sadistic deputy)
- Karl Swenson as Rev. Hoskins (prison inmate)
- Bill Mims as First Deputy Arraigning Burns
- Martin Garralaga as Old Man
- Lalo Ríos as Prisoner
- Bill Bixby as Helicopter Pilot (uncredited)
- Rodolfo Hoyos Jr. as Desk Sergeant (uncredited)
- George Keymas as Deputy (uncredited)
- Harry Lauter as Deputy in Canyon (uncredited)
- Bill Raisch as One Arm (uncredited)
- Dan Sheridan as Deputy Glynn (uncredited)

== Cast notes ==
- Bill Bixby has a small part as an airman in a helicopter, his first film appearance.
- It is one of the first film appearances of Carroll O'Connor.
- Bill Raisch is the one-armed man who fights with Douglas in a barroom brawl. The following year, Raisch began appearing with David Janssen in the TV series The Fugitive. He was also Burt Lancaster's stand-in.

== Production ==
Lonely Are the Brave was filmed after Kirk Douglas read Edward Abbey's novel The Brave Cowboy and convinced Universal Pictures to produce it with him in the starring role:

It happens to be a point of view I love. This is what attracted me to the story – the difficulty of being an individual today.

Douglas assembled the cast and crew through his production company Joel Productions, recruiting ex-blacklisted writer Dalton Trumbo, who had written Spartacus two years before, to write the screenplay.

The movie was filmed in and around Albuquerque, New Mexico: the Sandia Mountains, the Manzano Mountains, the Tijeras Canyon and Kirtland Air Force Base.

The working title for the film was The Last Hero, but the release title of the film was a matter of contention between the studio and Douglas, who wanted to call it The Brave Cowboy, after the novel. Douglas wanted the film to open in art houses and build an audience, but Universal chose to market the film as a Western, titling it Lonely Are the Brave and widely distributing it without any particular support. Despite this, the film gained a cult following and is often listed as one of the best Westerns ever made.

Miller directed the picture with a reverent and eloquent feeling for the landscape, complementing the story arc of a lone and principled individual tested by tragedy, and the drive of his fiercely independent conscience.

Lonely Are the Brave premiered in Houston, Texas, on May 24, 1962.

President John F. Kennedy watched the movie in the White House in November 1962. In his memoir Conversations with Kennedy, Ben Bradlee wrote, "Jackie read off the list of what was available, and the President selected the one [film] we had all unanimously voted against, a brutal, sadistic little Western called Lonely Are the Brave."

== Soundtrack ==
The score to Lonely Are the Brave was composed by Jerry Goldsmith, conducted by Joseph Gershenson, and performed by the Hollywood Studio Symphony. Goldsmith's involvement in the picture was the result of a recommendation by veteran composer Alfred Newman, who had been impressed with Goldsmith's score on the television show Thriller, and recommended Goldsmith to the head of Universal Pictures's music department, despite having never met him.

== Reception ==
On the review aggregator Rotten Tomatoes, the film has a 93% "fresh" rating, based on 14 reviews.

Kirk Douglas was nominated for a 1963 BAFTA Award as "Best Foreign Actor" for his work in Lonely Are the Brave, and placed third in the Laurel Awards for "Top Action Performance". The Motion Picture Sound Editors gave the film a "Golden Reel Award" for "Best Sound Editing" (Waldon O. Watson, Frank H. Wilkinson, James R. Alexander, James Curtis, Arthur B. Smith), in a tie with Mutiny on the Bounty.

Roger Ebert called it an "unrecognized masterpiece" in the review of the film Will Penny (1967).

The film is recognized by American Film Institute in these lists:

- 2008: AFI's 10 Top 10:
  - Nominated Western Film

== Quotes ==
- Jerry Bondi (Gena Rowlands): "Believe you me, if it didn't take men to make babies I wouldn't have anything to do with any of you!"
- Jack Burns (Kirk Douglas): "Know what a loner is? He's a born cripple. He's a cripple because the only person he can live with is himself. It's his life, the way he wants to live. It's all for him. A guy like that, he'd kill a woman like you. Because he couldn't love you, not the way you are loved."
- Jack Burns: "A westerner likes open country. That means he's got to hate fences. And the more fences there are, the more he hates them." Jerry Bondi: "I've never heard such nonsense in my life." Jack Burns: "It's true, though. Have you ever noticed how many fences there're getting to be? And the signs they got on them: no hunting, no hiking, no admission, no trespassing, private property, closed area, start moving, go away, get lost, drop dead! Do you know what I mean?"
- Jack Burns: "I don't need [identification] cards to figure out who I am, I already know." This line was used by the fugitive sailor in The Death Ship, the 1926 novel by B. Traven.

== See also ==
- List of films about horses
