= Down the River =

1982 book by Edward Abbey

First edition (publ. Dutton)

Down the River is a book by Edward Abbey, published in 1982. It is a loose collection of autobiographical and philosophical essays about the wilderness, written between 1978 and 1982.
