= Fire on the Mountain (1981 film) =

1981 television film directed by Donald Wrye

- Based on: Fire on the Mountain by Edward Abbey
- Written by: John Sacret Young
- Directed by: Donald Wrye
- Starring: Buddy Ebsen; Ron Howard
- Composer: Basil Poledouris
- Country of origin: United States
- Original language: English

Production
- Executive producer: John J. McMahon
- Producers: Robert Lovenheim; Rick Rosenthal; John Sacret Young
- Cinematography: Woody Omens
- Editor: Ronald J. Fagan
- Running time: 120 minutes
- Production companies: Carson Productions; River City Productions

Original release
- Network: NBC
- Release: November 23, 1981

Fire on the Mountain is a 1981 American neo-Western drama television film directed by Donald Wrye and written by John Sacret Young, based on the 1962 novel of the same name by Edward Abbey. The film stars Buddy Ebsen as John Vogelin and Ron Howard as Lee Mackie. It originally aired on NBC on November 23, 1981.

The film marked Ron Howard's last major acting role of any kind before he transitioned into becoming a full-time film director. Afterward, Howard would act in only one more project, reprising his role as Opie Taylor in the 1986 Andy Griffith Show reunion movie Return to Mayberry, also on NBC.

== Plot ==
John Vogelin is a widower and New Mexico rancher whose land adjoins the White Sands Missile Range and is about to be condemned by the United States Air Force to use his land to expand a bombing range. He is the last holdout among the several people whose land the Air Force wants, and he refuses to move, having lived on the land his whole life.

Lee Mackie, a young land developer who also has land that is to be cleared for the range, agrees to help the Army vacate the rancher, but realizing that the Army refuses to show any respect for Vogelin's situation, he soon joins in defying the military. Soon it boils down to a battle of wills between Vogelin and the equally bullheaded army officer Colonel Desalius, with Mackie, along with John's grandson Billy and his ranch hand (and surrogate daughter) Cruza also caught up in the mix.

== Cast ==
- Buddy Ebsen as John Vogelin
- Ron Howard as Lee Mackie
- Julie Carmen as Cruza Peralta
- Ross Harris as Billy Starr
- Ed Brodow as Major Parrell
- Michael Conrad as Colonel Desalius
- Gary Graham as Marshal Burr
- Richard Chaves as Lieutenant
- Harvey Vernon as Bartender
- Will Hare as Hayduke

== Awards and nominations ==
Year	Award	Category	Nominee(s)	Result	Ref.
1982	34th Primetime Creative Arts Emmy Awards	Outstanding Achievement in Film Sound Mixing	Thomas Causey; David J. Hudson; Mel Metcalfe; Ray West	Nominated	
