= Morality of violence =

In ethics, questions regarding the morality of violence ask under what conditions, if any, the use of violence can be morally justified. Three prominent views on the morality of violence are (1) the pacifist position, which states that violence is always immoral, and should never be used; (2) the utilitarian position, that means that violence can be used if it achieves a greater "good" for society; (3) a hybrid of these two views which both looks at what good comes from the use of violence, while also examining the types of violence used.

Christian theologians have traditionally argued against the morality of violence, arguing that Christians should love their enemies as well as their friends. Benito Mussolini often spoke about the morality of violence, arguing that violence was moral, and that it had spiritual importance as an expression of human will. Noted community activist, Saul Alinsky, also argued for a similar stance in his book Rules for Radicals where he states "That Perennial question, 'Does the end justify the means?' is meaningless as it stands; the real and only question regarding the ethics of means and ends is, and always has been, 'Does this particular end justify this particular means?'" Alinsky's view can be considered a hybrid of the pacifist and utilitarian view of violence.

== See also ==
- Anarchism and violence
- Just war theory
- Paradox of tolerance
