= Good News (novel) =

1980 novel by Edward Abbey

- First edition
- Author: Edward Abbey
- Genre: Science fiction
- Publisher: Dutton
- Publication date: 1980, 1991
- Media type: Print (hardback and paperback)
- Pages: 242 (original); 256 (reissue)
- ISBN: 0525115838
- Preceded by: The Brave Cowboy (partially)

Good News is a 1980 novel by Edward Abbey. It is his only work of science fiction and can be considered a distant sequel to The Brave Cowboy.

== Summary ==
The book is set in a Phoenix, Arizona of the near future after the economy and government have collapsed. Small bands of people (including Jack Burns, previously from The Brave Cowboy) are trying to live freely, but a would-be military dictator has other plans and is trying to set up a dictatorship using Phoenix as his base.

== Publication history ==
The book was first published in October 1980 with 242 pages and later reissued in January 1991 with 256 pages by Plume.
