= The Land Remembers =

1975 book by Ben Logan

- First edition
- Author: Ben Logan
- Language: English
- Genre: Autobiography
- Publisher: Viking Press
- Publication date: 1975

The Land Remembers is the autobiographical account of Ben Logan, first published in 1975 by Viking Press. Logan was raised on his family's farm, Seldom Seen, in the southwest Wisconsin hill country. The book explores Logan's early childhood in the 1930s, giving his personal account of his memories and life experiences, and the lessons he learned from his parents, neighbors and three older brothers.

The Land Remembers has received critical acclaim for its familiarity and depth, with many praising its beautiful language and relevant themes. Christopher Lehmann-Haupt wrote in an article for The New York Times that he was "irresistibly" drawn through the book, stating that "How can you feel nostalgia for things that never happened to you? How can you miss people just as you're meeting them for the first time? You feel nostalgia when the details of a world are so precisely concrete and right that by the time the author tells you his own reactions to that world you feel you already know it just about as well as he does." The book has sold nearly half a million copies in the U.S. and Canada, with Logan himself stating in the Afterword of the 2006 edition that "My 'unique' childhood [has been] shared with a great many people I will never see."

When referring to the messages that have been sent to him by readers, Logan said in the Afterword of the 2006 edition that "Many letters are filled with yearning—especially those from young people who want to see a promise of possibility in the book. Just maybe it could all be that way again—living simply, values clear, life focused on family, close relationships, and a wise partnership with the land that goes far beyond just making a living. Some have written that the book gave them courage to start a search for the qualities of those earlier days. I don't know if they can find that pastoral dream in today's world. I hope so and I wish them well."

Logan died on September 19, 2014, at the age of 94.
