= Fire on the Mountain (Abbey novel) =

1962 novel by Edward Abbey

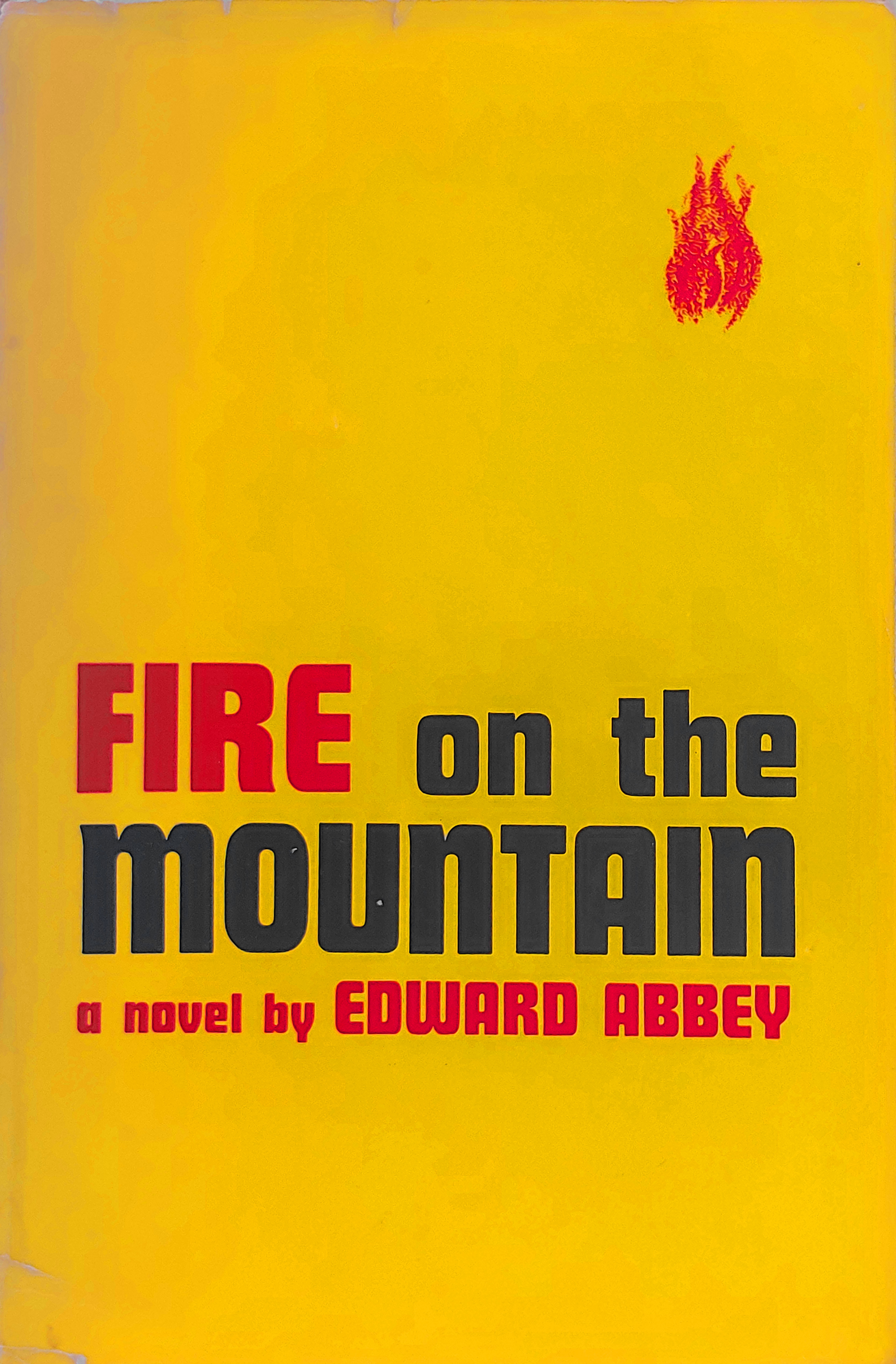
- First edition cover
- Author: Edward Abbey
- Language: English
- Genre: Western
- Publisher: The Dial Press
- Publication date: 1962
- Publication place: United States
- Media type: Print (hardcover, paperback)
- Pages: 211 pp
- ISBN: 0-8263-0457-5
- OCLC: 3540470
- Dewey Decimal: 813/.5/4
- LC Class: PZ4.A124 Fi 1978 PS3551.B2

Fire on the Mountain is a 1962 novel by Edward Abbey. It was Abbey's third published novel and followed Jonathan Troy and The Brave Cowboy.

== Plot summary ==
Abbey includes the following paragraph to introduce this book:

The story which follows was inspired by an event which took place in our country not many years ago. However, it is a work of fiction and any resemblance to living persons or actual places is accidental.

The story is narrated by Billy, a twelve-year-old boy from Pittsburgh who arrives at his grandfather John Vogelin's "Box V" ranch in New Mexico for his third summer visit. From the outset, signs of trouble are apparent: government letters accumulate on Vogelin's desk, and soldiers from the nearby Proving Grounds trespass on the ranch to recover missile debris. On his first night, Billy overhears a tense conversation between Vogelin and Lee Mackie, a close family friend and former ranch hand who now works as a real estate broker in Alamogordo. The U.S. government intends to seize the Box V and neighboring ranches to expand the White Sands Missile Range. A check for $65,000 has already been deposited with the District Court as payment, but Vogelin refuses all offers and declares he will resist with force if necessary, despite Lee arguing against it.

The following morning, Billy, Lee, and Vogelin ride on horseback into the foothills of Thieves' Mountain to search for a missing horse named Rascal. During the ride, Vogelin shares stories and observations about government range management, the poisoning of wildlife, and the slow destruction of the natural landscape. They reach a line cabin high on the mountain, where Billy encounters a mountain lion at the spring. After Lee departs the next morning, Billy and Vogelin continue searching the hills and eventually find Rascal dead on a distant ridge, shot through the jaw with a hollow-point bullet. Vogelin is convinced that soldiers from the Proving Grounds killed the horse.

As summer progresses, the government tightens its pressure. Colonel DeSalius visits the ranch to deliver a Declaration of Taking, informing Vogelin that his property has been legally condemned and that he must vacate within a month. His neighbors accept their settlements and sell out, leaving Vogelin as the sole holdout. Two weeks later, Marshal Burr arrives with an extension of the eviction order, which Vogelin refuses to accept. The marshal warns that the government will remove the livestock at Vogelin's expense if he does not comply. While Vogelin and Billy are away on a supply run, the Air Force moves in: soldiers and hired cowhands round up the entire Box V herd (roughly 150 head of cattle) and load them onto trucks. The ranch hand Eloy Peralta tries to stop them and is arrested. Upon returning, Vogelin watches the convoy leave, refusing any payment and calling the seizure "legal thievery".

DeSalius returns to make a final offer: Vogelin may retain possession of the ranch house and outbuildings for the remainder of his natural life, with the sole condition that he vacate during scheduled missile tests. Vogelin refuses this as well. Accepting that no negotiation will succeed, DeSalius warns that the government will resort to force. Vogelin sends his cook Cruzita and her children to relatives in El Paso and begins fortifying the ranch house, barring doors, shuttering windows, and stockpiling supplies. Before the confrontation, Vogelin also arranges for Lee to take Billy to El Paso and put him on a train home. Billy pulls the emergency brake, escapes the train, and makes his way back to the ranch overnight on foot, but Vogelin allows him to stay only one more week before insisting he leave.

On the appointed eviction day, the marshal returns with armed deputies. Vogelin barricades himself inside with a rifle and a shotgun, while Billy, tricked into leaving the house on an errand, is captured by a deputy. The marshal attempts to negotiate, but Vogelin warns that he will shoot the first man who touches his house. When the marshal approaches with an axe, Vogelin fires warning shots over his head. The deputies launch tear gas grenades at the house and send a man onto the roof to drop canisters down the chimneys. Throughout the standoff, Vogelin continues to fire but deliberately misses, while refusing to surrender. Just as the marshal orders incendiary tracer rounds to burn the house, Lee arrives with Billy's Aunt Marian. Lee walks unarmed toward the house, daring Vogelin to shoot him. Unable to fire on his friend, Vogelin throws down his rifle, calls Lee a traitor, and collapses. Lee catches him and carries him to the car.

Vogelin is taken to Aunt Marian's house in Alamogordo, where he falls into a near-catatonic state. On the third night he rouses himself, says a quiet goodbye to Billy, and disappears with his pickup truck, which is later found stripped in El Paso as a deliberate misdirection. Lee deduces that the old man has returned to the mountain. He and Billy drive out to the ranch and hike up to the line cabin, only to find Vogelin dead, seated against the cabin wall, having exhausted himself climbing the mountain and felling trees to block the road behind him. Lee and Billy decide to cremate the body inside the cabin. When the marshal arrives to protest, Lee holds him off with a broken chair leg while Billy sets the fire. The cabin burns in a towering blaze visible across the desert, and as the flames reach their peak, a mountain lion screams from the cliffs above.

== Criticism of government ==
The book is essentially a critique on the over-extension of government. Abbey makes an argument for limited government, more explicitly to limit government's ability to expropriate private land. However, Abbey still opposed the private sector from developing on natural lands, arguments which were explored in later books such as The Monkey Wrench Gang through the novel's antagonist, which put him at odds with aspects of these ideologies.

== Adaptations ==
The novel was adapted into a 1981 television film of the same name, which was directed by Donald Wrye and written by John Sacret Young. The film received a Primetime Creative Arts Emmy Award nomination in 1982.

Singer-songwriter Laura Veirs wrote a song called "The Ballad of John Vogelin" for her 2003 studio album Troubled by the Fire.
