= Hayduke Lives! =

1989 novel by Edward Abbey

- First edition
- Author: Edward Abbey
- Language: English
- Genre: Political novel
- Publisher: Little Brown
- Publication date: 25 January 1990
- Publication place: United States
- Media type: Print (hardback and paperback)
- Pages: 352 pp (first edition, hardback)
- ISBN: 0-316-00411-1 (first edition, hardback)
- OCLC: 20354398
- Dewey Decimal: 813/.54 20
- LC Class: PS3551.B2 H39 1990
- Preceded by: The Monkey Wrench Gang

Hayduke Lives!, written in 1989 by Edward Abbey, is the sequel to the popular book The Monkey Wrench Gang. It was published posthumously in 1990 in a mildly unfinished state, as Abbey did not complete revision prior to his death.

== Summary ==
Hayduke Lives! picks up several years after the cliffhanger and escape from the posse at the end of the previous book. It chronicles George Hayduke's return to the deserts of southern Utah and northern Arizona, where he continues the sabotage initiated in The Monkey Wrench Gang under numerous aliases, such as The Green Baron, and Fred Goodsell. The enigmatic "Kemosabe" (a hero from Abbey's first novel, The Brave Cowboy) also makes a reappearance, coming to the aid of Hayduke after his escape from the posse.

For a grand finale, Abbey reunites Hayduke with the outlaw-heroes of The Monkey Wrench Gang as they plan the destruction the world's largest walking dragline excavator (a giant earth mover, also called GEM or Goliath, used for surface mining) while combating a greed-ridden Mormon Bishop in another attempt to save the American Southwest from development. The narrative shifts numerous times between characters neglected by the previous book, including Bishop Love, the wives of Seldom Seen Smith and the FBI agents sent to end the sabotage.

== Legacy ==
The phrase "Hayduke Lives!" became a popular slogan among eco-activists. In October 2001, the month after the September 11 attacks, a man in Philadelphia was stopped from boarding a plane due to him carrying the book.
