= Edward Abbey =

American author advocating Radical Environmentalism (1927–1989)

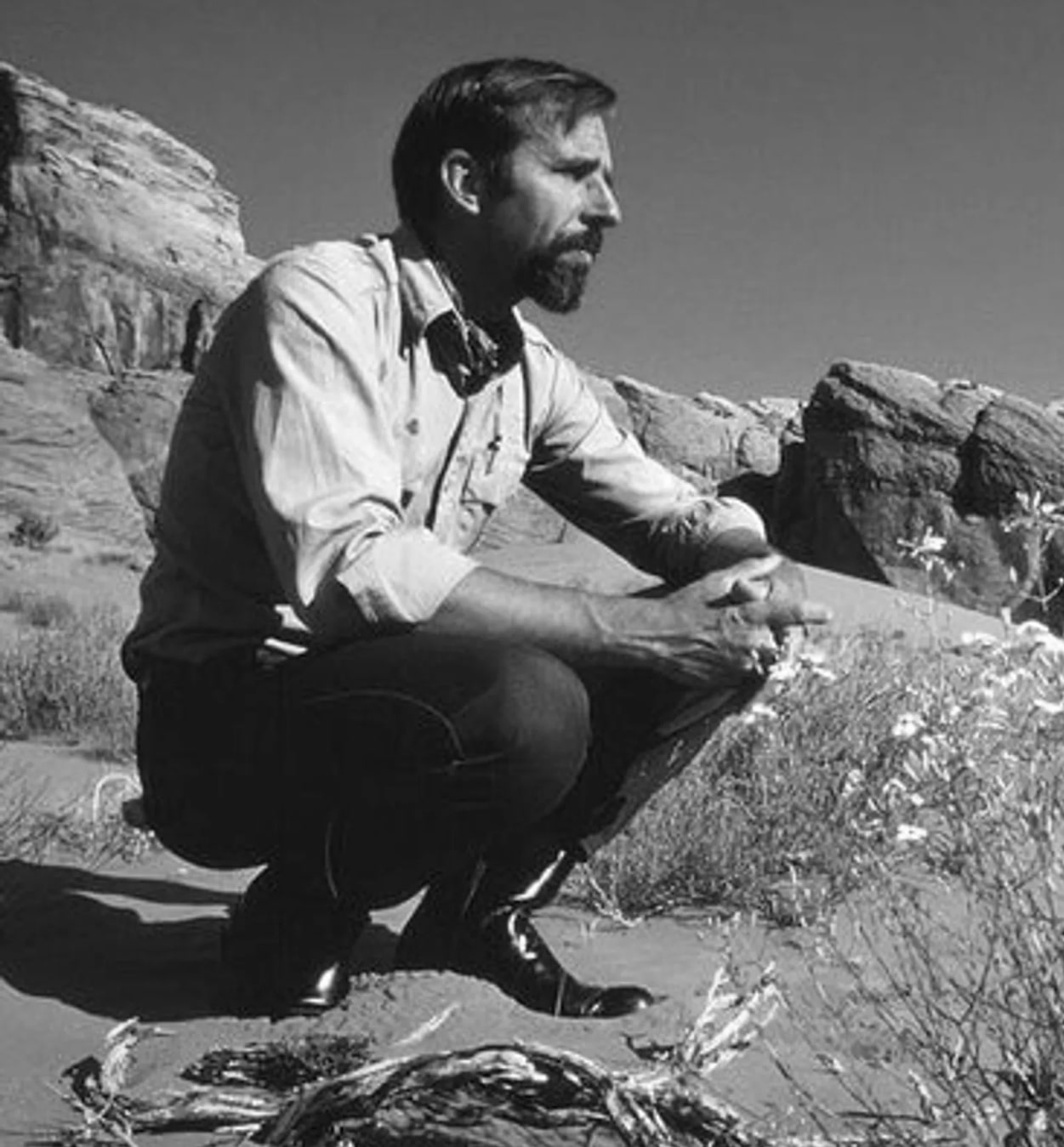
- Edward Abbey in Canyonlands National Park in 1969
- Born: January 29, 1927; Indiana, Pennsylvania, U.S.
- Died: March 14, 1989 (aged 62); Tucson, Arizona, U.S.
- Education: University of New Mexico
- Occupations: Essayist, novelist
- Writing career
- Notable work: The Monkey Wrench Gang Desert Solitaire

Edward Paul Abbey (January 29, 1927 – March 14, 1989) was an American author and essayist noted for his advocacy of environmental issues, criticism of public land policies, and anarchist political views. His best-known works include the novel The Monkey Wrench Gang, which has been cited as an inspiration by radical environmental groups, and the non-fiction work Desert Solitaire.

== Early life ==
Abbey was born in Indiana, Pennsylvania on January 29, 1927, to Mildred Postlewait and Paul Revere Abbey. Mildred was a schoolteacher and a church organist, and gave Abbey an appreciation for classical music and literature. Paul was an anarchist, atheist, and socialist whose views strongly influenced Abbey.

Abbey graduated from high school in Indiana, Pennsylvania, in 1945. Eight months before his 18th birthday, when he faced conscription into the U.S. military, Abbey decided to explore the American southwest. He traveled by foot, bus, hitchhiking, and freight train hopping. During this trip he fell in love with the desert country of the Four Corners region. Abbey wrote: "[...] crags and pinnacles of naked rock, the dark cores of ancient volcanoes, a vast and silent emptiness smoldering with heat, color, and indecipherable significance, above which floated a small number of pure, clear, hard-edged clouds. For the first time, I felt I was getting close to the West of my deepest imaginings, the place where the tangible and the mythical became the same."

== Military service and education ==
In the U.S. Army, Abbey applied for a clerk typist position but instead he served two years as a military police officer in Italy. Abbey was promoted in the army twice but due to his tendency to oppose authority, was twice demoted and was honorably discharged as a private. His experience in the military left him with a distrust for large institutions and regulations which influenced his writing throughout his career and strengthened his anarchist beliefs.

When he returned to the United States, Abbey took advantage of the G.I. Bill to attend the University of New Mexico, where he received a B.A. in philosophy and English in 1951, and a master's degree in philosophy in 1956. During his time in college, Abbey supported himself by working a variety of odd jobs, including being a newspaper reporter and bartending in Taos, New Mexico. During this time he had few male friends but had close relationships with a number of women. Shortly before getting his bachelor's degree, Abbey married his first wife, Jean Schmechal (another UNM student). While an undergraduate, Abbey was the editor of a student newspaper in which he published an article titled "Some Implications of Anarchy". A cover quotation of the article, "ironically attributed to Louisa May Alcott", stated "Man will never be free until the last king is strangled with the entrails of the last priest." University officials seized all of the copies of the issue and removed Abbey from the editorship of the paper.

Upon receiving his honorable discharge papers, he sent it back to the department with the words "Return to Sender". The FBI took note and added a note to his file which was opened in 1947 when Edward Abbey committed an act of civil disobedience; he posted a letter while in college urging people to rid themselves of their draft cards. Abbey was on the FBI's watch-list since then and he was watched throughout his life. In 1952, Abbey wrote a letter against the draft in times of peace and again the FBI took notice, writing, "Edward Abbey is against war and military." Throughout his life, the FBI took notes, building a profile on Abbey, observing his movements and interviewing many people who knew him. Towards the later part of his life, Abbey learned of the FBI's interest in him and said "I'd be insulted if they weren't watching me."

After graduating, Schmechal and Abbey traveled together to Edinburgh, Scotland, where Abbey spent a year at Edinburgh University as a Fulbright scholar. During this time, Abbey and Schmechal separated and ended their marriage. In 1951 Abbey began having an affair with American southwest artist Rita Deanin, who in 1952 would become his second wife after he and Schmechal divorced. Deanin and Abbey had two children, Joshua N. Abbey and Aaron Paul Abbey.

Abbey's master's thesis explored anarchism and the morality of violence, asking the two questions: "To what extent is the current association between anarchism and violence warranted?" and "In so far as the association is a valid one, what arguments have the anarchists presented, explicitly or implicitly, to justify the use of violence?". After receiving his master's degree, Abbey spent 1957 at Stanford University on a Wallace Stegner Creative Writing Fellowship.

== Work for National Park Service ==
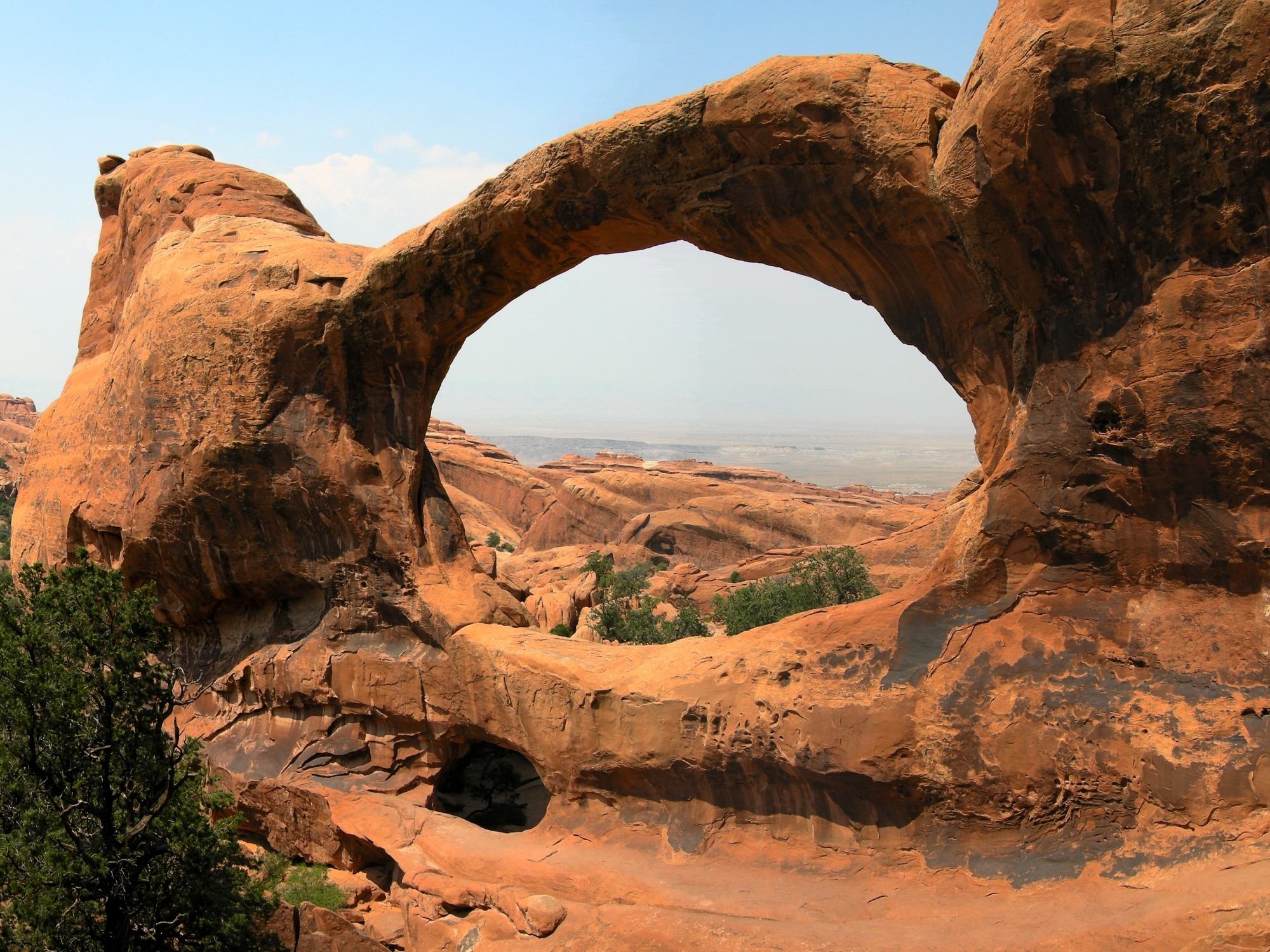
Abbey spent time as a park ranger at what became Arches National Park near Moab, Utah

In 1956 and 1957, Abbey worked as a seasonal ranger for the United States National Park Service at Arches National Monument (now a national park), near the town of Moab, Utah. Abbey held the position from April to September each year, during which time he maintained trails, greeted visitors, and collected campground fees. He lived in a house trailer that had been provided to him by the Park Service, as well as in a ramada that he built himself. During his stay at Arches, Abbey accumulated a large volume of notes and sketches which later formed the basis of his first non-fiction work, Desert Solitaire. Abbey's second son Aaron was born in 1959, in Albuquerque, New Mexico.

In 1961, the movie version of his second novel, The Brave Cowboy, with screenplay by Dalton Trumbo, was being shot on location in New Mexico by Kirk Douglas who had purchased the novel's screen rights and was producing and starring in the film, released in 1962 as Lonely Are the Brave. Douglas once said that when Abbey visited the film set, he looked and talked so much like Douglas's friend Gary Cooper that Douglas was disconcerted. However, over 25 years later when Abbey died, Douglas wrote that he had 'never met' him. In 1981, his third novel, Fire on the Mountain, was also adapted into a TV movie by the same title.

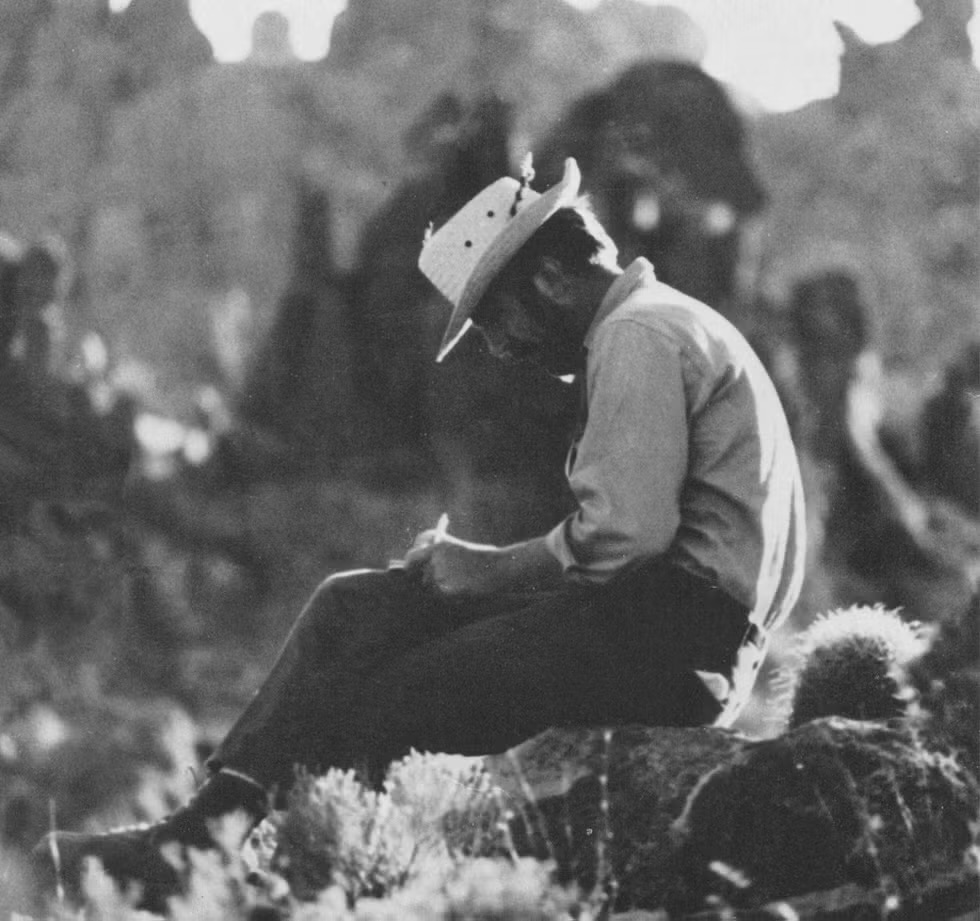
A photo of Abbey from the back cover of The Monkey Wrench Gang

On October 16, 1965, Abbey married Judy Pepper, who accompanied Abbey as a seasonal park ranger in the Florida Everglades, and then as a fire lookout in Lassen Volcanic National Park. Judy was separated from Abbey for extended periods of time while she attended the University of Arizona to get her master's degree. During this time, Abbey slept with other women—something that Judy gradually became aware of, causing their marriage to suffer. On August 8, 1968, Pepper gave birth to a daughter, Susannah "Susie" Mildred Abbey. Ed purchased the family a home in Sabino Canyon, outside of Tucson. Judy died of leukemia on July 11, 1970, an event that crushed Abbey, causing him to go into "bouts of depression and loneliness" for years. It was to Judy that he dedicated his book Black Sun. However, the book was not an autobiographical novel about his relationship with Judy. Rather it was a story about a woman with whom Abbey had an affair in 1963. Abbey finished the first draft of Black Sun in 1968, two years before Judy died, and it was "a bone of contention in their marriage".

Desert Solitaire, Abbey's fourth book and first non-fiction work, was published in 1968. In it, he describes his stay in the canyon country of southeastern Utah from 1956 to 1957. Desert Solitaire is regarded as one of the finest nature narratives in American literature, and has been compared to Thoreau's Walden. In it, Abbey vividly describes the physical landscapes of southern Utah and delights in his isolation as a backcountry park ranger, recounting adventures in the nearby canyon country and mountains. He also attacks what he terms the "industrial tourism" and resulting development in the national parks ("national parking lots"), rails against the Glen Canyon Dam, and comments on various other subjects. In 1973, Abbey married his fourth wife Renee Downing. However, Abbey was always gone so they divorced after four years of marriage.

== Later life ==
Abbey met his fifth and final wife, Clarke Cartwright in 1978, and married her in 1982. Together they had two children, Rebecca Claire Abbey and Benjamin C. Abbey.

In 1984, Abbey went back to the University of Arizona to teach courses in creative writing and hospitality management. During this time, he continued working on his book Fool's Progress.

In July 1987, Abbey went to the Earth First! Rendezvous at the North Rim of the Grand Canyon. While there, he was involved in a heated debate over his views on immigration with an anarchist communist group known as Alien Nation. Abbey devoted an entire chapter in his book Hayduke Lives to the events that took place at the Rendezvous. In autumn of 1987, the Utne Reader published a Murray Bookchin letter that claimed that Abbey, Garrett Hardin, and the members of Earth First! were racists and eco-terrorists. Abbey was extremely offended, demanded a public apology, and stated that he was neither racist nor a supporter of terrorism. All three of the men Bookchin labelled "racist" opposed illegal immigration into the United States and contended that population growth would cause further harm to the environment. Regarding the accusation of "eco-terrorism," Abbey responded that the tactics he supported were trying to defend against the terrorism he felt was committed by government and industry against living beings and the environment.

== Death and burial ==
One final paragraph of advice: [...] It is not enough to fight for the land; it is even more important to enjoy it. While you can. While it's still here.

So get out there and hunt and fish and mess around with your friends, ramble out yonder and explore the forests, climb the mountains, bag the peaks, run the rivers, breathe deep of that yet sweet and lucid air, sit quietly for a while and contemplate the precious stillness, the lovely, mysterious, and awesome space.

Enjoy yourselves, keep your brain in your head and your head firmly attached to the body, the body active and alive, and I promise you this much; I promise you this one sweet victory over our enemies, over those desk-bound men and women with their hearts in a safe deposit box, and their eyes hypnotized by desk calculators. I promise you this; You will outlive the bastards.

— Edward Abbey

Edward Abbey died on March 14, 1989, at the age of 62, in his home in Tucson, Arizona. His death was due to hemorrhaging from esophageal varices; these are often a consequence of portal hypertension, commonly due to alcoholic liver cirrhosis. Showing his sense of humor, he left a message for anyone who asked about his final words: "No comment." Abbey also left instructions on what to do with his remains: Abbey wanted his body transported in the bed of a pickup truck, and wished to be buried as soon as possible. He did not want to be embalmed or placed in a coffin. Instead, he preferred to be placed inside of an old sleeping bag, and requested that his friends disregard all state laws concerning burial. "I want my body to help fertilize the growth of a cactus or cliff rose or sagebrush or tree." said the message. For his funeral, Abbey stated "No formal speeches desired, though the deceased will not interfere if someone feels the urge. But keep it all simple and brief." He requested gunfire and bagpipe music, a cheerful and raucous wake, "[a]nd a flood of beer and booze! Lots of singing, dancing, talking, hollering, laughing, and lovemaking."

A 2003 Outside article described how his friends honored his request:

"The last time Ed smiled was when I told him where he was going to be buried," says Doug Peacock, an environmental crusader in Edward Abbey's inner circle. On March 14, 1989, the day Abbey died from esophageal bleeding at 62, Peacock, along with his friend Jack Loeffler, his father-in-law Tom Cartwright, and his brother-in-law Steve Prescott, wrapped Abbey's body in his blue sleeping bag, packed it with dry ice, and loaded Cactus Ed into Loeffler's Chevy pickup. After stopping at a liquor store in Tucson for five cases of beer, and some whiskey to pour on the grave, they drove off into the desert. The men searched for the right spot the entire next day and finally turned down a long rutted road, drove to the end, and began digging. That night they buried Ed and toasted the life of America's prickliest and most outspoken environmentalist.

Abbey's body was buried in an undisclosed desert location, believed by some to be within the Cabeza Prieta region of Arizona. The friends carved a marker on a nearby stone, reading:

EDWARD
PAUL
ABBEY
1927–1989
No Comment

In late March, about 200 friends of Abbey's gathered near the Saguaro National Monument near Tucson and held the wake he requested. A second, much larger wake was held in May, just outside his beloved Arches National Park, with such notables as Terry Tempest Williams and Wendell Berry speaking.

== Documentaries ==
- Wrenched, by Jerome filmmaker ML Lincoln is a 2013 documentary film that picks up where Edward Abbey's iconic novel The Monkey Wrench Gang left off, chronicling Abbey's legacy of environmental civil disobedience. This was originally called Lines Across the Sand.
- Edward Abbey: A Voice in the Wilderness is a 1993 award-winning PBS documentary by Eric Temple.
- The Cracking of Glen Canyon Damn—with Edward Abbey and Earth First! (1982) captured the legendary first action of radical desert rats when they dropped a 300-foot long black plastic "crack" over the dam and called poetically for its demise. Produced by Toby McLeod, Glenn Switkes and Randy Hayes.

== Literature ==
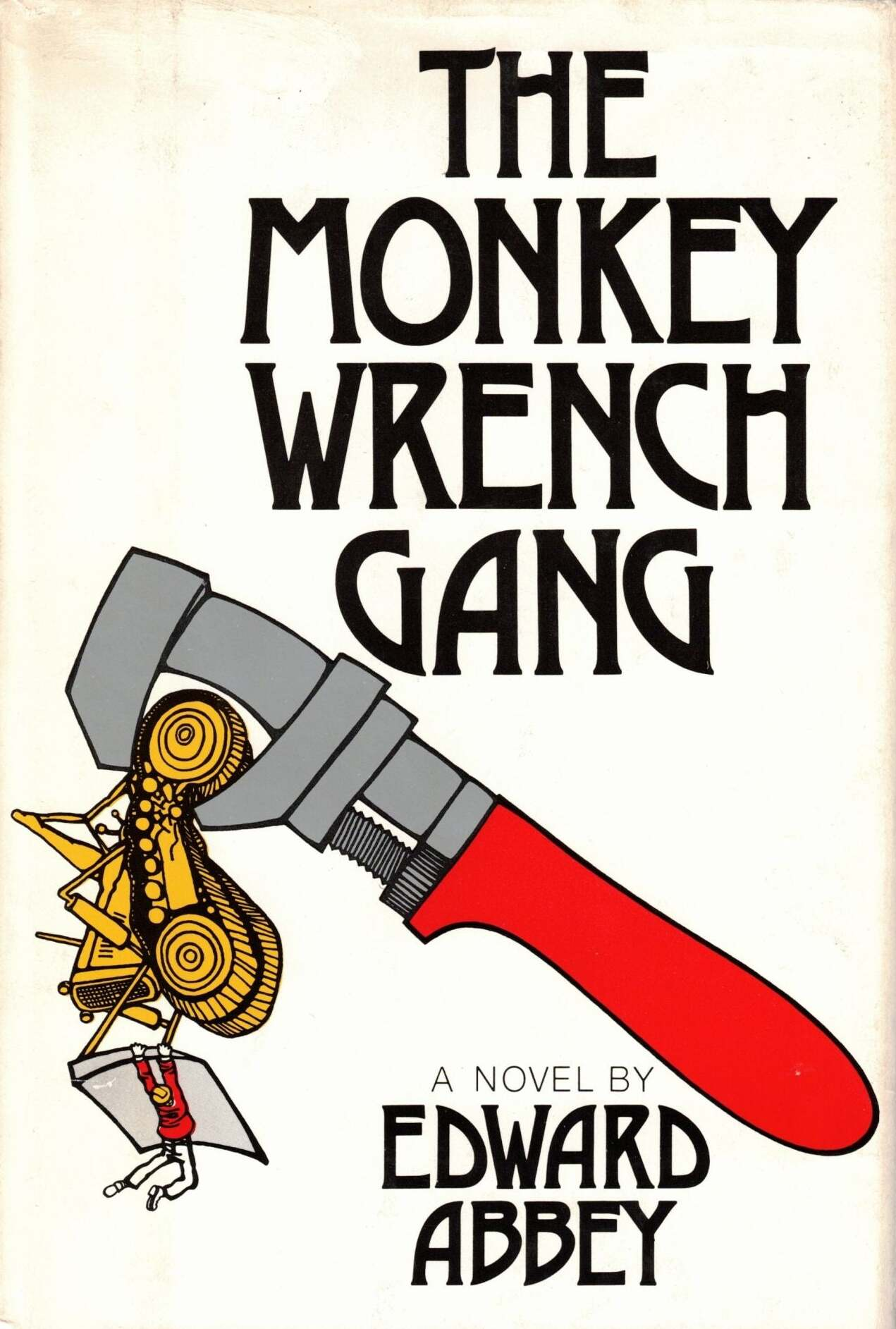
The Monkey Wrench Gang was one of Abbey's better-known books, and was an inspiration for radical environmental groups, such as Earth First!

Abbey's literary influences included Aldo Leopold, Henry David Thoreau, Gary Snyder, Peter Kropotkin, and A. B. Guthrie, Jr. Although often compared to Thoreau or Aldo Leopold, Abbey did not wish to be known as a nature writer, saying that he didn't understand "why so many want to read about the world out-of-doors, when it's more interesting simply to go for a walk into the heart of it." The theme that most interested Abbey was that of the struggle for personal liberty against the totalitarian techno-industrial state, with wilderness being the backdrop in which this struggle took place. Most of Abbey's writing criticizes the park services and American society for its reliance on motor vehicles and technology. He wanted to preserve the wilderness as a refuge for humans and believed that modernization was making us forget what was truly important in life.

Regarding his writing style, Abbey states: "I write in a deliberately provocative and outrageous manner because I like to startle people. I hope to wake up people. I have no desire to simply soothe or please. I would rather risk making people angry than putting them to sleep. And I try to write in a style that's entertaining as well as provocative. It's hard for me to stay serious for more than half a page at a time." Abbey felt that it was the duty of all authors to "speak the truth—especially unpopular truth. Especially truth that offends the powerful, the rich, the well-established, the traditional, the mythic".

Abbey's abrasiveness, opposition to anthropocentrism, and outspoken writings made him the object of much controversy. Agrarian author Wendell Berry claimed that Abbey was regularly criticized by mainstream environmental groups because Abbey often advocated controversial positions that were very different from those which environmentalists were commonly expected to hold.

Abbey has also drawn criticism for what some regard as his racist and sexist views. In an essay called "Immigration and Liberal Taboos", collected in his 1988 book One Life at a Time, Please, Abbey expressed his opposition to immigration ("legal or illegal, from any source") into the United States: "[I]t occurs to some of us that perhaps ever-continuing industrial and population growth is not the true road to human happiness, that simple gross quantitative increase of this kind creates only more pain, dislocation, confusion and misery. In which case it might be wise for us as American citizens to consider calling a halt to the mass influx of even more millions of hungry, ignorant, unskilled, and culturally-morally-genetically impoverished people. At least until we have brought our own affairs into order. Especially when these uninvited millions bring with them an alien mode of life which—let us be honest about this—is not appealing to the majority of Americans. Why not? Because we prefer democratic government, for one thing; because we still hope for an open, spacious, uncrowded, and beautiful—yes, beautiful!—society, for another. The alternative, in the squalor, cruelty, and corruption of Latin America, is plain for all to see."

It is often stated that Abbey's works played a significant role in precipitating the creation of Earth First!. The Monkey Wrench Gang inspired environmentalists frustrated with mainstream environmentalist groups and what they saw as unacceptable compromises. Earth First! was formed as a result in 1980, advocating eco-sabotage or "monkeywrenching". Although Abbey never officially joined the group, he became associated with many of its members, and occasionally wrote for the organization.

== Selected works ==
=== Fiction ===
- Jonathan Troy (1954) (ISBN 1-131-40684-2)
- The Brave Cowboy (1956) (ISBN 0-8263-0448-6)
- Fire on the Mountain (1962) (ISBN 0-8263-0457-5)
- Black Sun (1971) (ISBN 0-88496-167-2)
- The Monkey Wrench Gang (1975) (ISBN 0-397-01084-2)
- Good News (1980) (ISBN 0-525-11583-8)
- The Fool's Progress (1988) (ISBN 0-8050-0921-3)
- Hayduke Lives (1990) (ISBN 0-316-00411-1)
- Earth Apples: The Poetry of Edward Abbey (1994) (ISBN 0-312-11265-3)

=== Non-fiction ===
- Desert Solitaire: A Season in the Wilderness (1968) (ISBN 0-8165-1057-1)
- Appalachian Wilderness (1970)
- Slickrock (1971) (ISBN 0-87156-051-8)
- Cactus Country (1973)
- The Journey Home (1977) (ISBN 0-525-13753-X)
- The Hidden Canyon (1977)
- Abbey's Road (1979) (ISBN 0-525-05006-X)
- Desert Images (1979)
- Down the River (with Henry Thoreau & Other Friends) (1982) (ISBN 0-525-09524-1)
- In Praise of Mountain Lions (1984)
- Beyond the Wall (1984) (ISBN 0-03-069299-7)
- One Life at a Time, Please (1988) (ISBN 0-8050-0602-8)
- A Voice Crying in the Wilderness: Notes from a Secret Journal (1989)
- Confessions of a Barbarian: Selections from the Journals of Edward Abbey, 1951–1989 (1994) (ISBN 0-316-00415-4)

=== Letters ===
- Cactus Chronicles,. Published by Orion Magazine, Jul–Aug 2006
- Postcards from Ed: Dispatches and Salvos from an American Iconoclast (2006) (ISBN 1-57131-284-6)

=== Anthologies ===
- Slumgullion Stew: An Edward Abbey Reader (1984)
- The Best of Edward Abbey (1984)
- The Serpents of Paradise: A Reader (1995)

== See also ==
- Ecodefense: A Field Guide to Monkeywrenching (book)
