= The Monkey Wrench Gang =

Novel by Edward Abbey

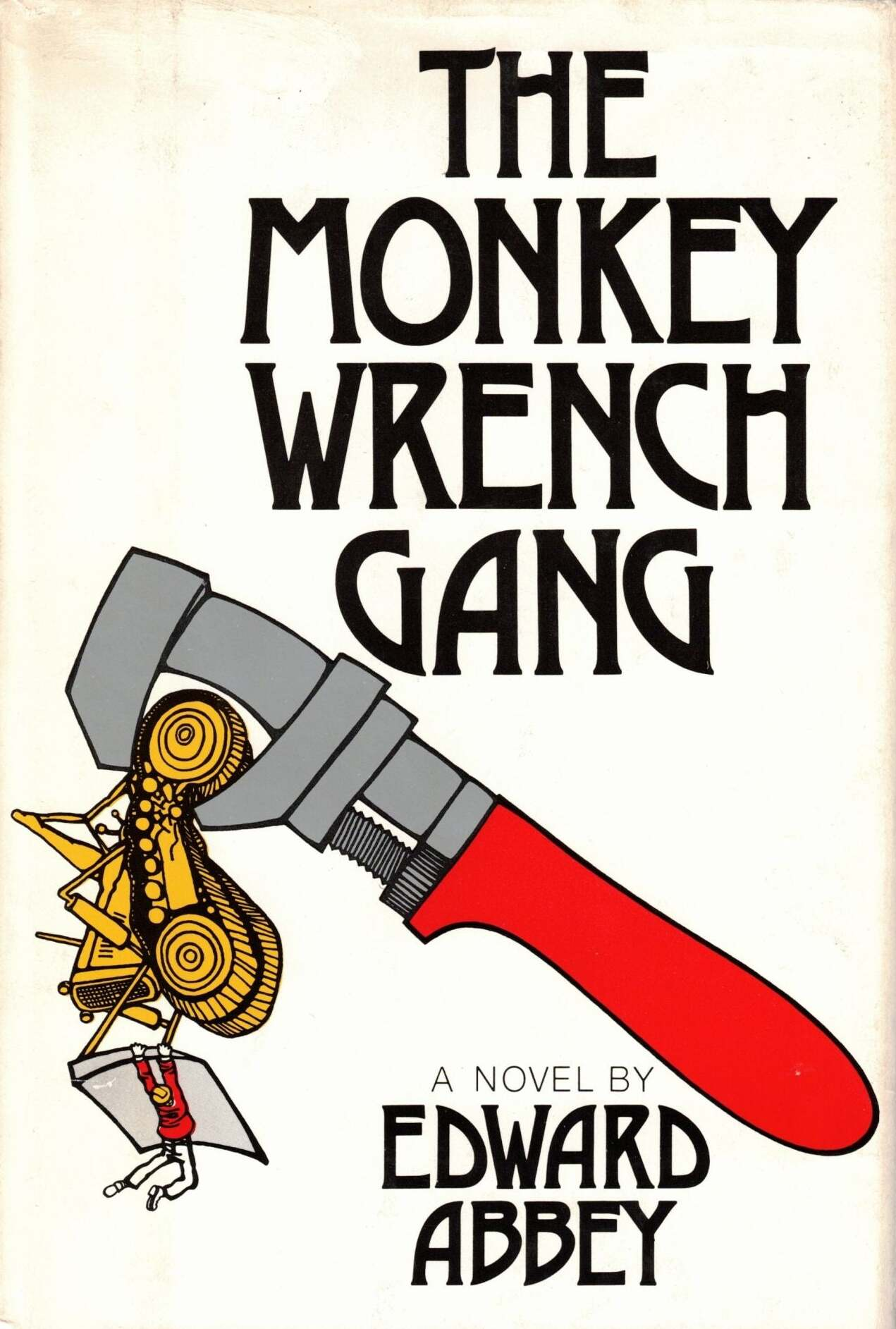
- First edition cover
- Author: Edward Abbey
- Language: English
- Genre: Anarchist, novel
- Publisher: Lippincott Williams & Wilkins
- Publication date: August 1, 1975
- Publication place: United States
- Media type: Print (hardback & paperback)
- Pages: 352 pp (hardback edition)
- ISBN: 0397010842 (hardback edition)
- OCLC: 1256794
- Dewey Decimal: 813/.5/4
- LC Class: PZ4.A124 Mo PS3551.B2
- Followed by: Hayduke Lives!

The Monkey Wrench Gang is a novel written by American author Edward Abbey (1927–1989), published in 1975.

Abbey's most famous work of fiction, the novel concerns the use of sabotage to protest environmentally damaging activities in the Southwestern United States, and was so influential that the term "monkeywrench," often used as a verb, has come to mean, besides sabotage and damage to machines, any sabotage, activism, law-making, or law-breaking to preserve wilderness, wild spaces and ecosystems.

In 1985, Dream Garden Press released a special 10th anniversary edition of the book featuring illustrations by R. Crumb, plus a chapter titled "Seldom Seen at Home" that had been deleted from the original edition. Crumb's illustrations were used for a limited-edition calendar based on the book. The most recent edition was released in 2006 by Harper Perennial Modern Classics.

== Plot summary ==
The book's four main characters are ecologically minded misfits—"Seldom Seen" Smith, a Jack Mormon river guide; Doc Sarvis, an odd but wealthy and wise surgeon; Bonnie Abbzug, his young Jewish feminist assistant; and a rather eccentric Green Beret Vietnam veteran, George Hayduke. Together, although not always working as a tightly knit team, they form the titular group dedicated to the destruction of what they see as the system that pollutes and destroys their environment, the American West. As the gang's attacks on deserted bulldozers and trains continue, the law closes in.

The gang opposes the development in the American Southwest, viewing it as a threat to the region's landscapes and ecosystems. Their central target is the Glen Canyon Dam, which they seek to destroy to restore the Colorado River's natural flow,

== Legacy ==
The book received positive reviews. The New York Times stated, "Since the publication of his novel The Monkey Wrench Gang last September, Mr. Abbey, a 48-year-old native of a rural town in Pennsylvania, has become an underground cult hero throughout the West among students, environmentalists, and would-be 'eco-raiders.'

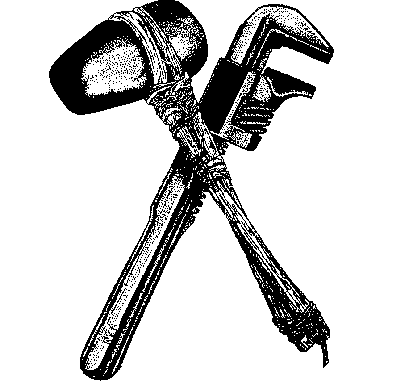
A monkey wrench and a stone hammer on the logo of Earth First!

The book is popular among the more extreme faction of the environmental movement, and contributed to the radicalization of some environmentalists. In his book Screw Unto Others, the author who writes under the pen name George Hayduke states that Edward Abbey was his mentor and mentions The Monkey Wrench Gang as the origin of the term monkey-wrenching. The Monkey Wrench Gang inspired environmentalist David Foreman to help create Earth First! a direct action environmental organization that often advocates much of the minor vandalism depicted in the book. Many scenes of vandalism and ecologically motivated mayhem, including a billboard burning at the beginning of the book and the use of caltrops to elude a group of vigilantes, are presented in sufficient detail as to form a skeletal how-to for would-be saboteurs.

In his book Sewer, Gas & Electric: The Public Works Trilogy, author Matt Ruff notes:

One of my other literary inspirations for the [...] subplot was Edward Abbey’s The Monkey Wrench Gang. That book’s protagonist, George Hayduke, is a Vietnam vet and former POW who launches a campaign of sabotage against the polluters who are ruining his beloved southwestern desert. Hayduke is a pretty angry guy, but he also loves life, and in his own fatalistic way he remains an optimist (my favorite line in the novel, uttered at a moment when Hayduke’s luck appears to have run out, is 'When the situation is hopeless, there’s nothing to worry about').

== Sequel and adaptations ==
Hayduke Lives! continues the story from where The Monkey Wrench Gang left off.

A film adaptation of the book, written and directed by Henry Joost and Ariel Schulman, has long been in pre-production. Neil Young is set to score the film, and Open Road Films is its distributor in the United States. The film rights holders for the book filed suit against the producers of Night Moves, claiming that the film's plot is significantly similar to that of the book.

== See also ==
- Adbusters
- Culture jamming
- Environmentalism
