= Eco-warrior =

Eco-warrior is a term for an environmental activist.

It may also refer to:

- Eco Warriors Flag in Australia
- Eco Warriors Movement, Ghana
- Confessions of an Eco-Warrior (1991) a non-fiction book by conservation activist David Foreman
