= Thermcon =

FBI sabotage investigation

THERMCON was the code name of an FBI operation which was launched in response to the sabotage of the Arizona Snowbowl ski lift near Flagstaff, Arizona, in October 1987 by three people from Prescott, Arizona, Mark Davis, Margaret Millet and Marc Baker. In a November 1987 letter claiming responsibility, the group called themselves the "Evan Mecham Eco-Terrorist International Conspiracy" (EMETIC). The group named themselves after Evan Mecham, the then-Governor of Arizona. The Arizona Snowbowl spent $50,000 repairing the damage.

== EMETIC ==
EMETIC's first act was to damage a chairlift at the Fairfield Snow Bowl near Flagstaff, Arizona. During the incident an acetylene torch was used to cut bolts from several of the lift's support towers. A warning letter claiming responsibility for the damage also contained a threat to "chain the Fairfield CEO to a tree at the 10,000 foot level and feed him shrubs and roots until he understands the suicidal folly of treating the planet primarily as a tool for making money." Upon receipt of the letter the resort shut down the lift in order to repair the over US$50,000 in damages caused by the EMETIC.

The EMETIC made two other attacks against targets the group considered to be causing ecological damage before the FBI began arresting group members. In May 1989, three people from Prescott, Arizona, Marc Leslie Davis, Margaret Katherine Millet and Marc Andre Baker, were arrested on charges related to the sabotage against the Fairfield Sun Bowl and on conspiracy charges to damage powerlines leading from nuclear power plants in Arizona, California and Colorado. A fourth EMETIC member, Ilse Washington Asplund, was later arrested on related charges. All four individuals pleaded guilty and were sentenced in September 1991.

Short for "Thermite Conspiracy" – thermite being an incendiary mixture of powdered aluminium and iron oxide – Operation THERMCON employed more than 50 FBI agents and involved the infiltration of the group between 1987 and 1989 by undercover FBI agent Michael Fain, and the recruitment of Ron Fraizer, a friend of the three, as an informant. Despite the name "Thermite Conspiracy," cutting torches were the tool of choice for the group.

The operation culminated in the arrest of the three following an attempt to down a transmission tower in the Arizona desert which led from the Palo Verde Nuclear Generating Station. Two additional persons were also indicted as a result. The fourth was Ilse Apslund, a friend of the three from Prescott. The fifth, Dave Foreman, at the time the leader of Earth First! based in Tucson, Arizona, was not involved in the group but was nonetheless charged with conspiracy, on the grounds that he had given a copy of the book Ecodefense inscribed "happy monkeywrenching" and a $100 donation to undercover agent Michael Fain.

== Trial ==
The FBI claimed the group was planning similar attacks on other powerlines in Arizona, Colorado and California. FBI testimony during and after the trial characterized the group's future plans as targeting powerlines to or from the Central Arizona Project Aqueduct, the Rocky Flats Plant, and the Diablo Canyon Power Plant.

Earth First! claimed the operation was intended to discredit Earth First! by linking its leaders to the conspiracy, particularly Dave Foreman. During the course of the operation, undercover agent Michael Fain (who used the name Mike Tait) was recorded saying "I don't really look for them to be doing a lot of hurting people... (Foreman) isn't really the guy we need to pop – I mean in terms of an actual perpetrator. This is the guy we need to pop to send a message. And that's all we're really doing... Uh-oh! We don't need that on tape! Hoo boy!" According to an FBI field office file released to Earth First! activists Judi Bari and Darryl Cherney in 1996, FBI agents provocateurs associated with THERMCON spent two years winning the trust of the Prescott group, actively encouraging them to sabotage powerlines and attempting – unsuccessfully – to convince the group that they should use, and even offering to buy, explosives for this purpose. FBI agents also selected the site and purchased and transported cutting equipment prior to the sabotage attempt on May 30, 1989, leading to accusations of entrapment.

== Sentences ==
Attorney Gerry Spence represented the defendants. The four from Prescott entered into a plea bargain. Davis was sentenced to 6 years in prison and restitution of $19,821 to the Arizona Snowbowl. Millet was sentenced to 3 years and restitution of $19,821. Baker was sentenced to 6 months and a $5000 fine, and Asplund to 30 days and a $2000 fine. The four were sentenced in September 1991.

Dave Foreman's case was separated from the other four and sentencing was deferred until 1996, when the charges were reduced to a single misdemeanor and he was fined $250.

== See also ==
- COINTELPRO (Counter Intelligence Program), a program of the United States Federal Bureau of Investigation that was aimed at investigating and disrupting dissident political organizations within the United States.
- Operation Backfire (FBI) – FBI operation launched against ecoterrorists and environmentalists
