= Tree spiking =

Radical environmentalist tactic

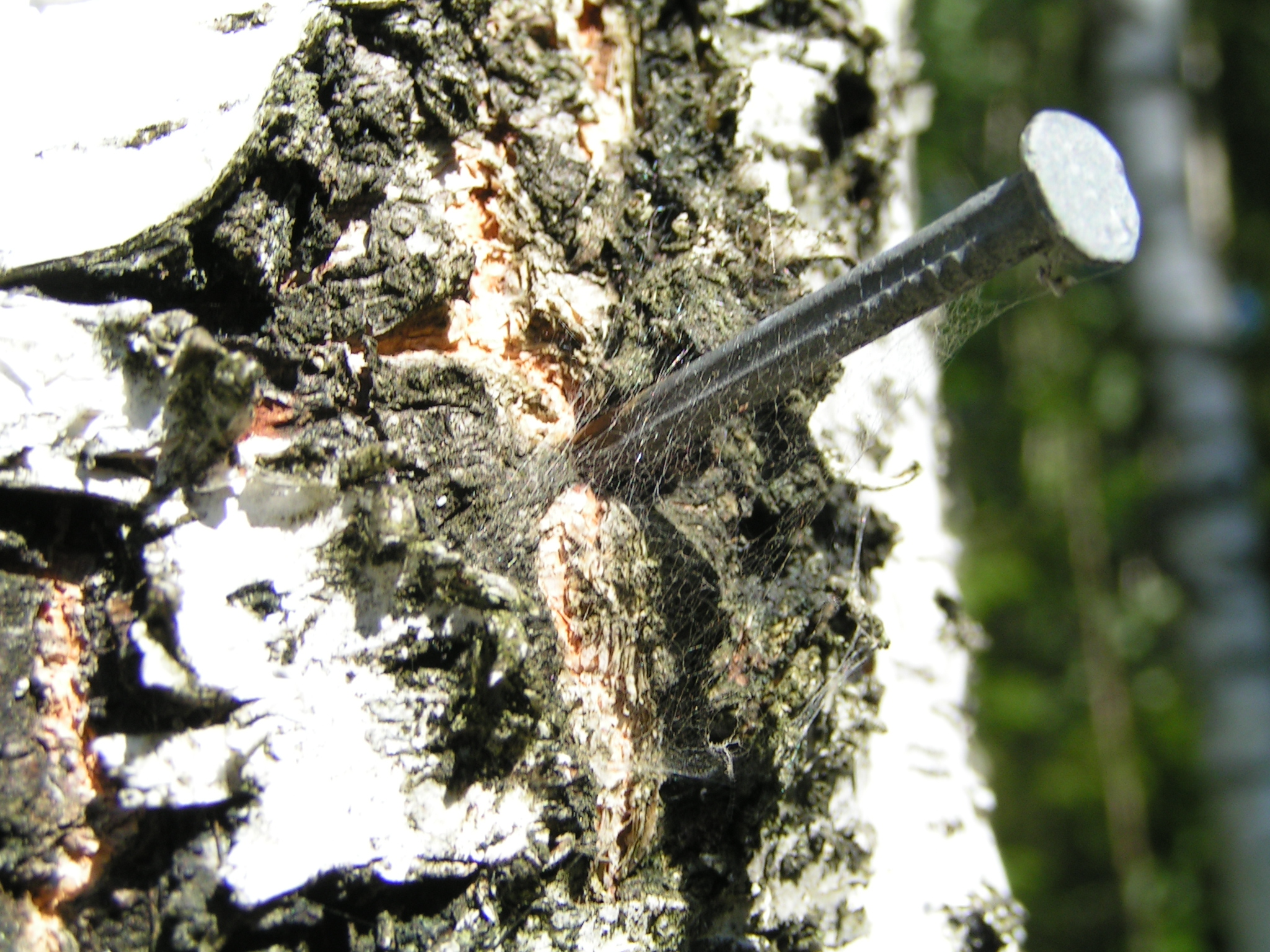
Nail sunk into a birch in Sweden.

Tree spiking involves hammering a metal rod, nail or other material into a tree trunk, either inserting it at the base of the trunk where a logger might be expected to cut into the tree, or higher up where it would affect the sawmill later processing the wood. Contact with the spike often damages saw blades, which can result in injuries to nearby workers. The spike can also lower the commercial value of the wood by causing discoloration, reducing the economic viability of logging in the long term, without threatening the life of the tree. It is illegal in the United States, and has been described as a form of "eco-terrorism" by logging industry advocates.

== History ==
It was first mentioned in the context of discouraging logging in Earth First! magazine. It came to prominence as a contentious tactic within unconventional environmentalist circles during the 1980s, after it was advocated by Earth First! co-founder Dave Foreman in his book Ecodefense. In the book, he discusses how to do it and how to avoid risks to the activist and the logger, such as by putting warning signs or marks in the area where the trees are being spiked.

On 8 May 1987, George Alexander, a millworker, was severely injured when a saw blade shattered after contact with a tree spike and cut his jaw in half. Louisiana-Pacific, Alexander's employer, offered a $20,000 reward for information leading to the alleged tree spiker, but no charges were filed in this incident. The spiking itself was thought to be inconsistent with Earth First! tactics, as the trees were not in an old-growth forest and the placement of the nail suggested it was inserted after the tree was cut. Alexander later filed a lawsuit against Louisiana-Pacific claiming that the band saw had been weakened from previous strikes with nails, but that he was forced to work with the saw or face dismissal.

This industrial accident led the leaders of Earth First! to denounce tree spiking. Tree spiking is labeled as eco-terrorism by logging advocates who claim it is potentially dangerous to loggers or mill-workers, although by 1996 only this single injury resulting from tree spiking had been reported.

== By country ==
=== New Zealand ===
Beech trees that were being logged in 1998 in the Tuatapere area were spiked. Police were unable to trace those who were responsible.

Pat O'Dea, while he was the mayor for the Buller District, suggested in 2000 that Native Forest Action (NFA) had spiked trees during a direct action campaign against native forest logging on the West Coast. This was denied by NFA spokesperson Dean Bagient-Mercer. In 1998, Kevin Smith from Forest and Bird had said that tree spiking was proposed by some individuals involved in the NFA campaign.

=== United States ===
Following the 1987 injury of California mill worker George Alexander, anti-tree spiking legislation was introduced as the Anti-Tree Spiking Act, and was passed into federal law as an amendment, introduced by senators James A. McClure and Mark Hatfield, to the Anti-Drug Abuse Act of 1988. In 1993, John Blount and others were convicted under this statute for spiking trees in the Clearwater National Forest, after Tracy Stone-Manning agreed to testify in exchange for immunity from prosecution. In 2021, President Biden nominated Tracy Stone-Manning to lead the Bureau of Land Management. Leading up to her confirmation, significant press attention was given to allegations that she was a central member in the 1989 tree-spiking plot.

In 1990, Earth First! leaders, including Judi Bari and Mike Roselle, issued a memo and press release to Earth First! activists in Northern California and Southern Oregon, renouncing tree-spiking as a tactic on the eve of Redwood Summer, a 1990 campaign of nonviolent protests against logging of the redwood forest.

== See also ==
- Ecotage
- Tree sitting
