= One Big Union =

One Big Union may refer to:

- One Big Union (concept), a concept that all workers should be organised in one union
- One Big Union (Canada), a trade union in Canada
- The One Big Union Monthly, a publication produced by the Industrial Workers of the World
- One Big Union: Judi Bari’s Vision of Green-Worker Alliances in Redwood Country, a book by Steve Ongerth about activist Judi Bari
