= Confessions of an Eco-Warrior =

1991 book by American environmentalist Dave Foreman

- Title page for Confessions of an Eco-Warrior (1991)
- Author: Dave Foreman
- Publisher: Crown Publishing Group
- Publication date: 1991
- ISBN: 0-517-88058-X

Confessions of an Eco-Warrior is a book written in 1991 by Dave Foreman.

== About ==
Dave Foreman was the New Mexico lobbyist for The Wilderness Society in the 1970s. Disillusioned by the lack of progress in safeguarding the environment in the United States, particularly after a wilderness inventory by the United States Forest Service known as RARE II (Roadless Area Review and Evaluation), he was a co-founder of the environmental organization known as Earth First! (EF) in the 1980s. EF originally mixed innovative publicity, such as rolling a plastic "crack" down Glen Canyon Dam, with far-reaching wilderness proposals that went far beyond what the mainstream environmental groups were willing to advocate, and with conservation biology research from a biocentric perspective. Later however, after about 1987, EF became primarily associated with non-violent direct action activities.

Foreman took his inspiration for Earth First! from Edward Abbey's book The Monkey Wrench Gang which is a fictional account of a gang of four individuals who take on a pointless yet deeply symbolic effort to destroy and thus halt the machines of human expansion and putative "progress" in the American Southwest.

In 1989 Foreman was implicated in the FBI conspiracy known as THERMCON wherein four activists in Prescott, Arizona, who were only peripherally connected with EF, were enticed by undercover FBI agent Michael Fain (alias Mike Tait) who talked them into the destruction of a power line in the State of Arizona. Foreman himself wasn't involved, however he was arrested and indicted along with the four.

His book Confessions of an Eco-Warrior is partly an autobiographical account of RARE II and his disillusionment with the mainstream environmental movement, the early years of Earth First!, the FBI entrapment, and his ultimate disillusionment with what Earth First! became. It is also partly a statement of his views on wilderness and the state of the environmental movement.

In the book he expressed his view that Earth First!, by 1990, had largely run its course, and was starting to attract new members who took the group in a more countercultural and left-wing direction than he was comfortable associating with. The defining moments for Foreman, according to the book, were when some activists under the Earth First! banner held a "puke-in" at a shopping mall, when Edward Abbey was subjected to harsh criticism and heckling by some younger newcomers to EF when he attended the 1987 EF rendezvous (Foreman and the other old guard of EF, who revered Abbey, were horrified that he would receive that sort of treatment at an EF gathering), and when some Earth First! funds were diverted to launch a punk-style zine called "Live Wild or Die", which among other things espoused anarchism and attacked Foreman's and Abbey's views on some controversial issues then being debated within EF.

While Foreman and most of the rest of the old guard of EF severed their ties to the group in 1990, he remained an environmental activist. At the time Confessions was published, he had just launched a new magazine, Wild Earth (intended as a replacement for the 1980s-era Earth First! Journal), and was soon to launch a new environmental group, The Wildlands Project.

== Publication ==
- Confessions of an Eco-Warrior (1991), Crown Publishing Group. ISBN 0-517-88058-X
