= Bill Staley =

American football player (born 1946)

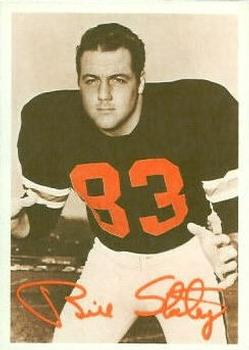

No. 83, 76
- Position: Defensive end

Personal information
- Born: September 9, 1946 (age 80); Walnut Creek, California, U.S.
- Listed height: 6 ft 3 in (1.91 m)
- Listed weight: 250 lb (113 kg)

Career information
- High school: Las Lomas (Walnut Creek)
- College: Utah State (1964-1967)
- NFL draft: 1968: 2nd round, 1st overall pick

Career history
- Cincinnati Bengals (1968-1969); Chicago Bears (1970–1972)

Awards and highlights
- First-team All-American (1967)

Career NFL/AFL statistics
- Fumble recoveries: 2
- Sacks: 10.5
- Stats at Pro Football Reference

William Patrick Staley (born September 9, 1946) is an American former professional football player who was a defensive end for five years in the American Football League (AFL) and National Football League (NFL). He played a total of 49 games, including two seasons with the Cincinnati Bengals and three with the Chicago Bears

== College career ==
Staley played defensive end at Utah State. The 25 most highly drafted football players from Utah State. Beban heads list for Heisman Trophy Title and Staley was among the top 10 which included Orenthal James "O.J." Simpson While at Utah, Staley was Playboy 1967 All-American Defense Staley played 49 games (21 starts) for the Bengals And the Chicago Bears over five seasons on the defensive line.

During the second to last game at Utah state Staley suffered a shoulder separation

Staley also competed for the Utah State Aggies track and field team as a discus thrower.

Utah State inducted Staley in the Hall of Fame class of 1995.

== Professional career ==
Staley was selected in the second round of the 1968 NFL draft. He has the distinction of being the second pick ever by the Cincinnati Bengals franchise. Staley played under Paul Brown who founded the Cincinnati Bengals. In 1970, the Bengals traded Staley, along with linebacker Harry Gunner, to the Chicago Bears for tackle Rufus Mayes. Staley retired after spending three years with the Bears.

== Life after Football ==
Staley lives on a farm in California with his wife with chronic headaches, a crippled body, and the beginning of dementia. Staley has Traumatic Brain Injury sustained from playing in the NFL. He wears a whistle around his neck to blow to end the anger like the NFL referees when he has outbursts.

Staley became deeply religious after his football career, in the 1980s becoming an anti-abortion activist. At one event outside a Planned Parenthood clinic in Ukiah, California in December 1988, Earth First! activists Judi Bari and Darryl Cherney confronted him with a deliberately offensive parody of Will the Circle Be Unbroken?, "Will the Fetus Be Aborted?" A few days after the car bombing attempt on Bari's life on May 24, 1990, a letter from someone identifying himself as "The Lord's Avenger," claiming credit for the bombing, was mailed to the Santa Rosa Press Democrat. The letter briefly cast suspicion on Staley as the author due to the notoriety of the Planned Parenthood incident. It was soon determined that the letter was a hoax from Bari's assailant designed to cast suspicion on Staley, capitalizing on the notoriety of the Planned Parenthood incident. Staley was cleared as a suspect in the bombing.

== Personal life ==
Staley married his wife Nona and they have two children.

He also has a daughter - Shannon Staley.

== See also ==
- Other American Football League players, coaches, and contributors
