= Greg King (writer) =

American journalist and writer

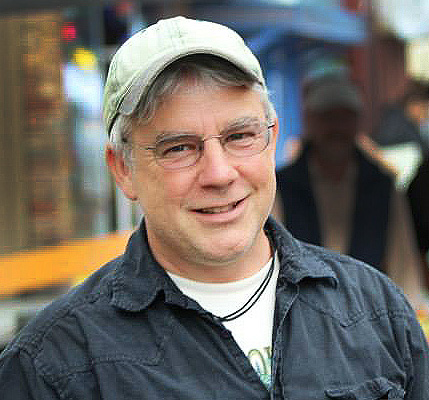
Greg King

Greg King (born 1961) is an American journalist and environmental activist in Northern California. He is president and executive director of Siskiyou Land Conservancy, a non-profit land trust.

King is credited with discovering and naming Headwaters Forest, in March, 1987, then the largest privately held ancient redwood grove still standing outside of parks. As a redwood activist, King pioneered the civil disobedience tactic of tree sitting, and he was a lead organizer and strategist dedicated to protecting Headwaters and other groves during the 1980s and 1990s. King is an authority on redwood logging and protection efforts that have occurred since 1850.

King was the principal author of the 2014 book, Rumours of Glory, the memoir of Canadian performing artist Bruce Cockburn.

King's writing has earned four journalism awards, including two Lincoln Steffens Investigative Journalism Awards, and his photographs have run in several national publications. In 2016 the Environmental Protection Information Center presented King with its annual Sempervirens Lifetime Achievement Award.

In 2023, PublicAffairs published King's book, The Ghost Forest: Racists, Radicals, and Real Estate in the California Redwoods, a history of redwood logging and protection efforts.

== Background ==
King was born in Guerneville, California, the fifth generation of his family to live in western Sonoma and Mendocino Counties. King's father, Thomas King, was a banker in Guerneville, and his mother, Jessie Casler King, was a schoolteacher. King's ancestors arrived on the California North Coast in the 1860s and owned the King-Starrett mill in Monte Rio, then one of the largest redwood mills in Sonoma County. The King Range Mountains, in Humboldt County, are named for the family. King's great-great uncle, William King, was owner of the 2,000-acre King Ranch (810 ha), in Cazadero, Sonoma County, and later served as Sonoma County supervisor.

King graduated from University of California, Santa Cruz in 1985 with a degree in politics. That same year, he joined the staff of the West Sonoma County Paper (now called The Bohemian) as a staff reporter and photographer. At the Paper, King covered issues that included redwood logging in Sonoma County by timber giant Louisiana Pacific Corporation. King's redwood articles earned him a 1986 Lincoln Steffens Investigative Journalism Award. At the time, King was also investigating the 1985 takeover of Humboldt County's Pacific Lumber Company by Houston-based Maxxam Corporation. In 1986, Pacific Lumber owned the only large groves of ancient redwoods still standing outside of state and national parks.

== The fight for the last redwoods ==
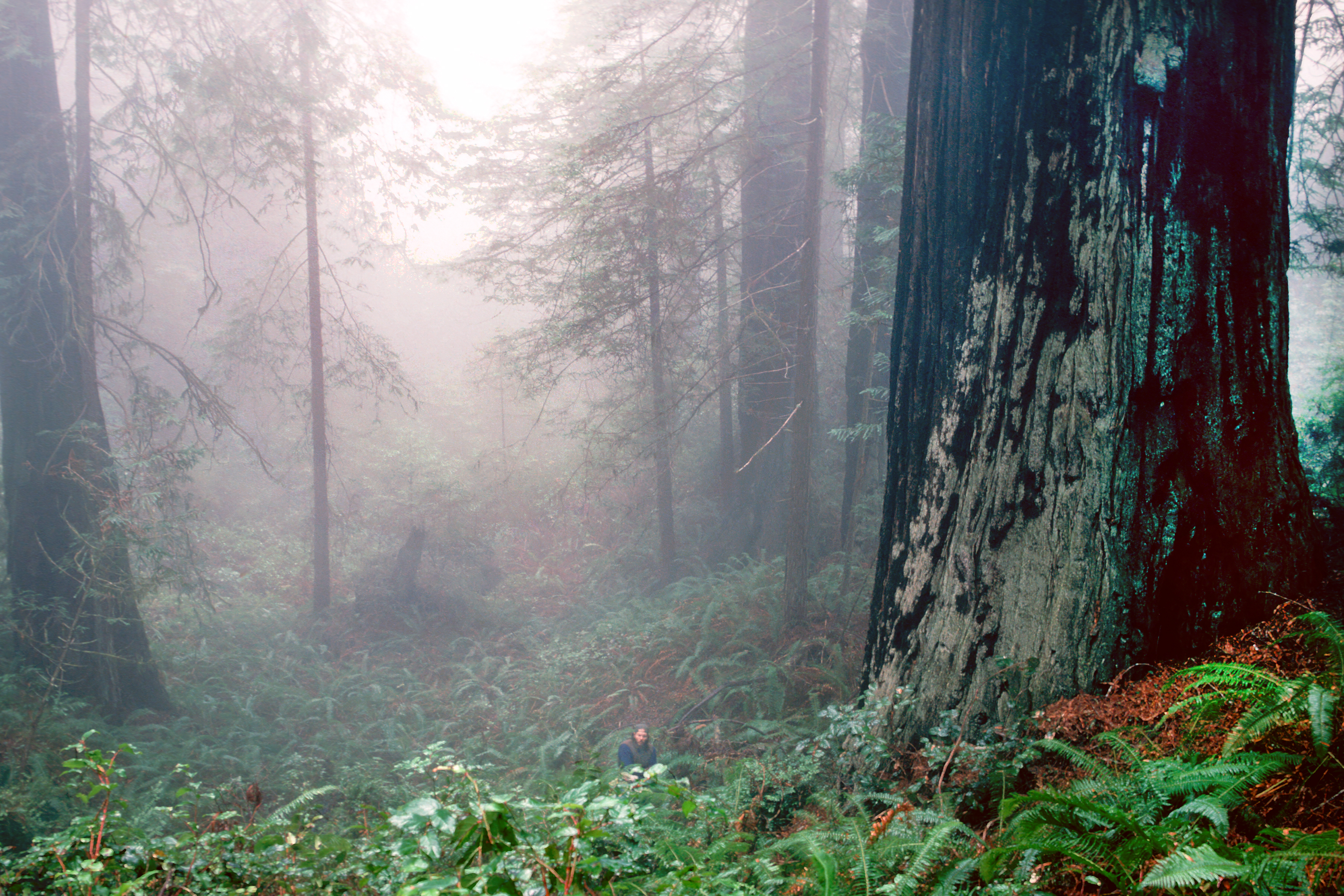
Headwaters Forest, 1989.

In early 1986 Maxxam instituted a new logging regime on Pacific Lumber property that doubled the annual acreage of old-growth redwood to be cut, and changed logging methods from selection to clear-cutting. In July 1986 King and Darryl Cherney co-founded Humboldt County Earth First! as a means of addressing Maxxam's liquidation of the last ancient redwoods. In November 1986 King resigned from his job at the Paper and moved to Humboldt County to focus on halting Maxxam's logging. In March, 1987, on a solo hike through Pacific Lumber's ancient redwood groves, King discovered and named Headwaters Forest, which stood at 3,000 acres (1,200 ha) and at the time was the world's largest unprotected ancient redwood grove.

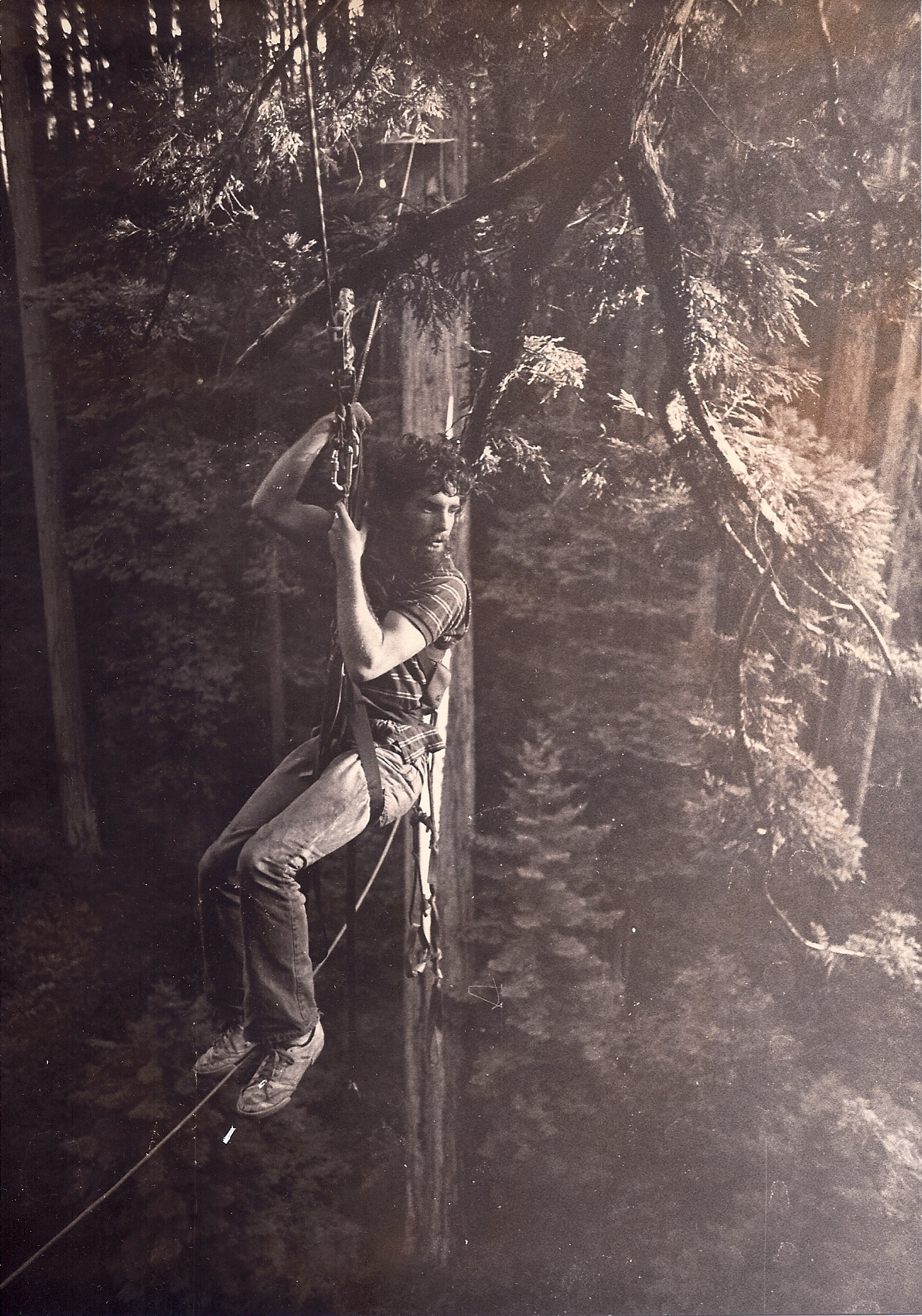
King on traverse, 150 feet (46 m) above the ground, in tree-sit occupation of All Species Grove, September 1987

Between 1987 and 1990, King and Cherney, and later Judi Bari, organized dozens of environmental demonstrations. In August 1987, and again in September that year, King and activist Mary Beth Nearing became the first people ever to tree-sit in an ancient redwood grove.

In 1990, after Bari and Cherney were severely injured by a pipe bomb placed under the driver's seat of Bari's car, King dropped out of the direct action movement but continued to organize for protection of Headwaters Forest and the other remaining old-growth habitat on Pacific Lumber land. In 2002 Cherney and Bari's estate won a $4.4 million federal lawsuit against the FBI and the Oakland Police Department after a jury found that the police agencies "had violated their civil rights and First Amendment rights by defaming them and casting a pall over their plans to protest against logging."

In 1991 King returned to journalism. He wrote and photographed for the Paper and freelanced. In 1992 he earned a second Lincoln Steffens award for his 1991 article in the East Bay Express, "Child's Play," about the nexus between computer game manufacturers and the U.S. military. King's photographs have appeared in Newsweek, Smithsonian, Mother Jones, Rolling Stone, and The Houston Post.

== Further activism and journalism ==
In 1999 King founded the Smith River Project to protect private lands along California's only major undammed river. In 2004 King expanded the project by founding Siskiyou Land Conservancy, a land trust that serves Del Norte, Humboldt, and Mendocino Counties in California. In 2015/2016 Siskiyou Land Conservancy conducted a health survey in the town of Smith River, which is surrounded 1,000 acres (400 ha) of Easter lily fields where farmers apply 300,000 pounds of pesticides annually. The survey demonstrated significant impacts to Smith River residents caused by the pesticides. Reacting to pressure from Siskiyou Land Conservancy, state and federal agencies have found significant pesticide contamination of the Smith River estuary, which is among California's key refugia for several endangered species including coho salmon.

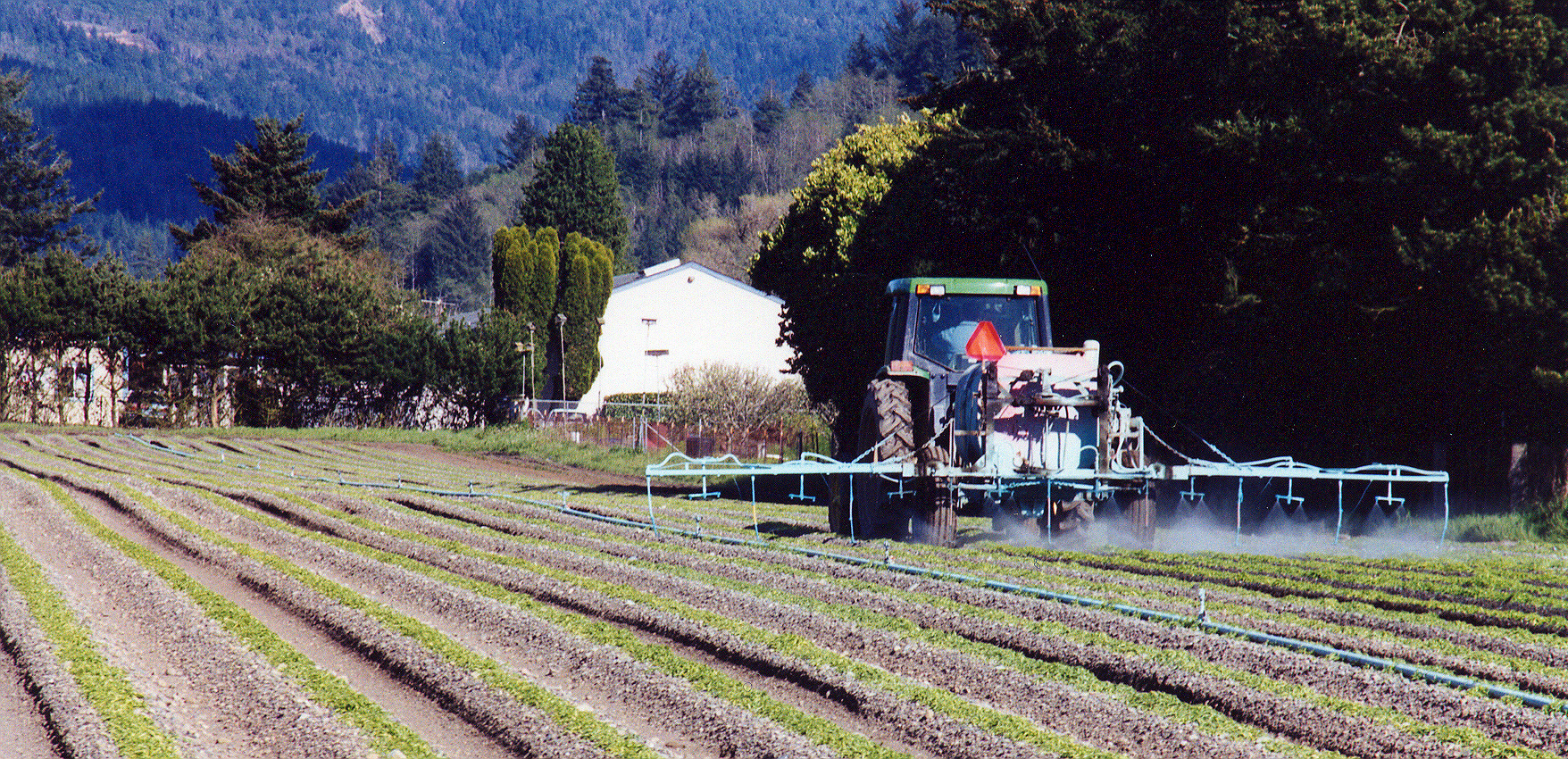
Spraying pesticides on Easter lily fields in the town of Smith River, adjacent to Smith River Elementary School.

The Siskiyou Land Conservancy was instrumental in halting construction in 2019 of a proposed wind farm on biologically fragile ridge systems in western Humboldt County. King continues to run Siskiyou Land Conservancy as president and executive director.

Since 2004 King has published several long form interviews in The Sun magazine, with subjects including Patti Smith, Bruce Cockburn, Daniel Ellsberg, Brian Willson, and Darryl Cherney. His writing has also appeared in Sierra, the Portland Oregonian, the Sacramento Bee, the Santa Rosa Press Democrat, the Eureka Times-Standard, and Counterpunch. King was the principal author of Rumours of Glory, the memoir of Canadian performing artist Bruce Cockburn, published by Harper in 2014. King was a featured photographer in the 2001 book Coast Redwood: A Natural and Cultural History (Cachuma Press). In 2018 King's retrospective essay on California redwood logging ran as lead article in the annual Humboldt Journal of Social Relations. In 2016 the Environmental Protection Information Center presented King with its annual Sempervirens Lifetime Achievement Award. In 2023, PublicAffairs published King's book, The Ghost Forest: Racists, Radicals, and Real Estate in the California Redwoods, a history of redwood logging and protection efforts, which, in part, details the history of the Save the Redwoods League.

== Publications ==
- Coast Redwood: A Natural and Cultural History (Cachuma, 2001). Edited by John Evarts and Marjorie Popper. ISBN 0-9628505-5-1. Featured King's photography.
- Rumours of Glory. Harper, 2014. With Bruce Cockburn.
- King, Greg (June 6, 2023). The Ghost Forest: Racists, Radicals, and Real Estate in the California Redwoods. PublicAffairs. ISBN 9781541768673.
