= Steve Ongerth =

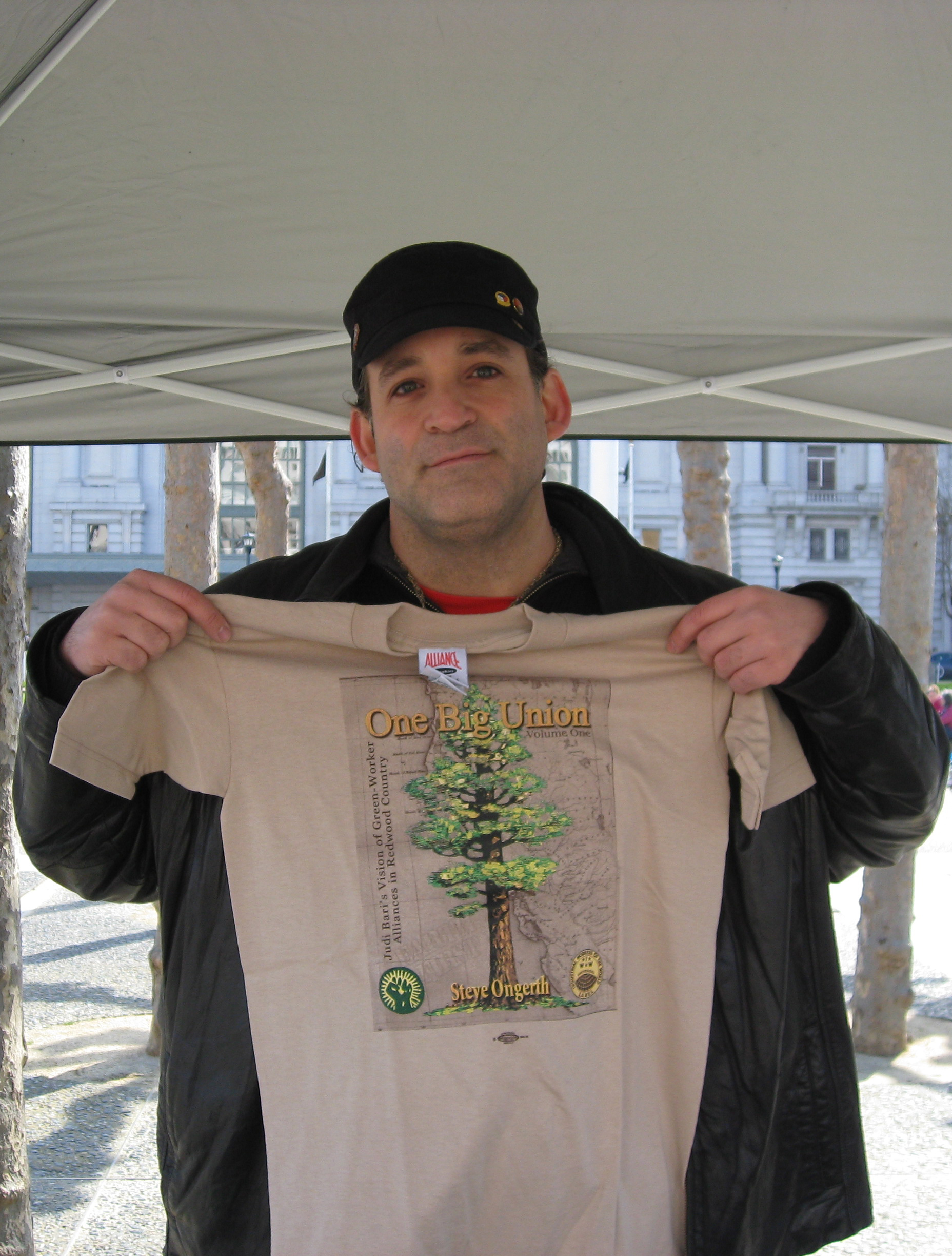
Steve Ongerth holding a shirt promoting his soon-to-be published book about Judi Bari

Steve Ongerth (born April 24, 1971) is an American labor activist, environmentalist, political activist, and webmaster based in the San Francisco Bay Area. He served as writer and editor of One Big Union: Judi Bari’s Vision of Green-Worker Alliances in Redwood Country (2010).

After earning degrees in architecture and art history at University of California, Berkeley, he met activist Judi Bari in 1995. He was influenced to join the IWW and get deeply involved as an environmentalist to protect redwood forests in Northern California.

== Biography ==
Steve Ongerth was born in Houston, Texas. His family moved and took him to Pine Bluff, Arkansas; Redlands and El Cerrito, California; and Ennis, Texas before returning to the San Francisco Bay Area in 1978. Since that date he has been a resident of the Bay Area.

Ongerth graduated from El Cerrito High School. He attended the University of California, Berkeley from 1989 to 1994, and received two Bachelor's degrees, one in Architecture and the other in Art History.

Since 1995 Ongerth has been a member of the Industrial Workers of the World (IWW). He became involved with the IWW after reading Timber Wars and meeting activist Judi Bari, a former leader in Earth First! She inspired him to join the IWW, which she had worked with earlier in an effort to organize timber workers and collaborate on protection of California redwood forests. Ongerth has been a union activist since that time. For more than a decade he has helped maintain the IWW website, and participated in numerous union organizing campaigns.

Ongerth was a programmer at Free Radio Berkeley from 1995 to 1999. He hosted a weekly labor and environmental program inspired by the work of Bari, who died of cancer in 1997. He interviewed Bari three times on the air during the years 1995 and 1996.

In 1995 Ongerth joined in the campaign to save Headwaters Forest; he continued with that project through 1999. A federal bill was passed in 1997 to acquire land to protect part of this forest. Ongerth often supported non-violent direct actions organized and carried out by Earth First!.

Ongerth began compiling the information for his book about the Green-Worker alliances in Redwood Country in 1997 after Bari's death from cancer. He worked on that project from that date until publishing the book in 2010.

Since 1998, he has also worked as a deckhand on ships in San Francisco Bay. He received his captain's license in 2009.
