= Rumours of Glory =

Rumours of Glory may refer to:

- "Rumours of Glory", a song from Humans (Bruce Cockburn album) (1980)
- Rumours of Glory (book), an autobiography by Bruce Cockburn
