= Gina Kolata =

American journalist

- Born: Gina Bari; February 25, 1948 (age 78); Baltimore, Maryland, U.S.
- Occupation: Science journalist
- Known for: Writing for The New York Times
- Notable work: Clone: The Road to Dolly, and the Path Ahead, Flu: The Story of the Great Influenza Pandemic of 1918 and the Search for the Virus that Caused It, Sex in America: A Definitive Survey
- Parents: Arthur Bari (father); Ruth Aaronson Bari (mother)
- Relatives: Judi Bari (sister), Martha Bari (sister); Lisa Bari (niece)

Gina Bari Kolata (born February 25, 1948) is an American science journalist, writing for The New York Times.

== Life and career ==
Kolata was born Gina Bari in Baltimore, Maryland. Her mother, mathematician Ruth Aaronson Bari (1917–2005), was of Jewish descent. Her father, Arthur Bari (1913–2006), was a diamond setter of Italian heritage. He was a WWII Marine Corps veteran who served in the South Pacific. One of her sisters is Hood College art historian Martha Bari. Another was Earth First! environmental activist, feminist, and assassination attempt survivor Judi Bari (1949–1997).

Kolata studied molecular biology as a graduate student at the Massachusetts Institute of Technology. She received a master's degree from University of Maryland, College Park in mathematics. She joined Science magazine, published by the American Association for the Advancement of Science, as a copy editor in 1973, and wrote for it as a journalist in the news section from 1974 until she moved to The New York Times in 1987. She remains a health and science reporter at the newspaper. Kolata has taught writing as a visiting professor at Princeton University and lectures across the country.

She is a "self-proclaimed exercise addict" (who thinks nothing of a 100-mile bike ride as a reward), according to a Times advertisement for itself.

Her husband, William G. Kolata, has taught mathematics and served as the technical director of the non-profit Society for Industrial and Applied Mathematics in Philadelphia, a society for mathematicians. The couple have two children, Therese and Stefan.

== Books ==
External videos
- Booknotes interview with Kolata on Flu: The Great Influenza Pandemic, February 27, 2000, C-SPAN
- Presentation by Kolata on Mercies in Disguise, March 28, 2017, C-SPAN

- Clone: The Road to Dolly, and the Path Ahead, ISBN 0-688-16634-2
- Flu: The Story of the Great Influenza Pandemic of 1918 and the Search for the Virus that Caused It, Touchstone 2001 ISBN 0-7432-0398-4
- Sex in America: A Definitive Survey, ISBN 978-0446671835
- The Baby Doctors: Probing the Limits of Fetal Medicine, ISBN 0-440-21011-9 (out of print)
- Ultimate Fitness: The Quest for Truth about Health and Exercise, ISBN 0-374-20477-2
- Rethinking Thin: The New Science of Weight Loss – and the Myths and Realities of Dieting. Picador. 2007. ISBN 978-0-312-42785-6.
- Mercies in Disguise: A Story of Hope, a Family's Genetic Destiny, and the Science that Rescued Them, St. Martin's Press, 2017 ISBN 978-1250064349

=== Other publications ===
- Kolata, Gina Bari. "Water Structure and Ion Binding: A Role in Cell Physiology", Science, 192 (4254), June 18, 1976, pp. 1220–1222.
