= Ruth Aaronson Bari =

American mathematician (1917–2005)

- Born: Ruth Aaronson; November 17, 1917; Brooklyn, New York, US
- Died: August 25, 2005 (aged 87); Silver Spring, Maryland, US
- Spouse: Arthur Bari
- Children: 3, including Judi Bari, Gina Kolata
- Relatives: Lisa Bari (granddaughter)

Academic background
- Education: Brooklyn College, Johns Hopkins University
- Thesis: Absolute Reducibility of Maps of at Most 19 Regions
- Doctoral advisor: Daniel Clark Lewis, Jr.

Ruth Aaronson Bari (November 17, 1917 – August 25, 2005) was an American mathematician known for her work in graph theory and algebraic homomorphisms. She was a professor at George Washington University, beginning in 1966.

== Career ==
The daughter of Polish-Jewish immigrants to the United States, Ruth Aaronson was born November 17, 1917, and grew up in Brooklyn, New York.

She attended Brooklyn College, earning her bachelor's degree in mathematics in 1939. She earned her Master of Arts degree at Johns Hopkins University in 1943, but had originally enrolled in the doctoral program. When the university suggested that women in the graduate program should give up their fellowships so that men returning from World War II could study, Bari acceded. After marrying Arthur Bari, she spent the next two decades devoted to their family. They had three daughters together.

She returned to Johns Hopkins for graduate work, and completed her dissertation on "absolute reducibility of maps of at most 19 regions" in 1966 at the age of 47. Bari's dissertation explored chromatic polynomials and the Birkhoff–Lewis conjecture. She determined that, "because of the fact that all other cubic maps with fewer than 20 regions contain at least one absolutely reducible configuration, it follows that the Birkhoff-Lewis conjecture holds for all maps with fewer than 20 regions." Her Ph.D. advisor was Daniel Clark Lewis, Jr. and her thesis was titled Absolute Reducibility of Maps of at Most 19 Regions.

After she received her degree, mathematician William Tutte invited Bari to spend two weeks lecturing on her work in Canada at the University of Waterloo. Bari's work in the areas of graph theory and homomorphisms—and especially chromatic polynomials—has been recognized as influential.

In 1976, two professors relied on computer work to solve the perennial problem of Bari's dissertation, involving the four-color conjecture. When her daughter Martha asked her if she felt cheated by the technological solution, Bari replied, "I'm just grateful that it was solved within my lifetime and that I had the privilege to witness it."

During her teaching career, Bari participated in a class-action lawsuit against George Washington University which protested inequalities in promotion and pay for female faculty members. The protests were successful. Notable students of Bari include Carol Crawford, Steven Kahn, and Lee Lawrence.

Bari retired at the legally mandated age of 70 in 1988 with the distinction of professor emeritus.

== Community and personal life ==
Bari was active in the Washington, DC community. In the early 1970s, Bari used a grant from the National Science Foundation to start a master's degree program in teaching mathematics. She felt that math teachers in DC public schools were not as well prepared as they needed to be.

Her three daughters became influential in their fields. Judi Bari (1949–1997) was a leading labor and environmental activist and feminist, who lived and worked in Northern California. She survived an assassination attempt in 1990. Gina Kolata is a mathematics, health and science journalist for the New York Times. Martha Bari is an art historian at Hood College in Frederick, Maryland.

Bari died on August 25, 2005, from complications of Alzheimer's disease. She had lived in Silver Spring, Maryland since 1963 and was 87 years old at the time of her death. She was survived by her husband of 64 years of marriage, Arthur Bari (1913–2006). In addition to their three daughters, they had two grandchildren, including Lisa Bari.
