= Who Bombed Judi Bari =

Who Bombed Judi Bari?
- Film poster
- Directed by: Mary Liz Thomson
- Produced by: Darryl Cherney
- Edited by: Mary Liz Thomson
- Production company: hokey pokey productions
- Release date: March 2012 (Santa Rosa)
- Running time: 95 minutes
- Country: United States
- Language: English

Who Bombed Judi Bari? is an American historical documentary about an assassination attempt on the life of Judi Bari, an American environmental and labor activist, which occurred on May 24, 1990 via a pipe bomb in her car. It was directed by Mary Liz Thomson and produced by Darryl Cherney. He is also an environmental activist and was traveling with Bari that day, but was not as severely wounded.

== Overview ==
While driving through Oakland, California on their way to a benefit concert for the Redwood Summer campaign to save California's coast redwood trees, activists Judi Bari and Darryl Cherney were injured when a pipe bomb detonated under the driver's seat of Bari's car. Bari, who was driving, was critically injured.

Oakland police and the FBI approached the explosion as a terrorist incident, and arrested Bari and Cherney. In their investigation, they tried to prove that the activists were transporting an explosive device that accidentally detonated. The two were never charged with a crime.

They filed a civil rights lawsuit in 1991 against these law enforcement organizations for violation of their constitutional rights. In 2002 they won the lawsuit (Bari had died of breast cancer in 1997). Cherney and the late Bari's estate were awarded $4.4 million, to be paid by the FBI and Oakland Police Department. The authorities allegedly did not investigate any other suspects. Discovery during the lawsuit revealed crime scene photos that clearly showed the bomb was located under Bari's seat, not in the back seat as investigators had alleged.

In 2012, a federal judge ordered the FBI not to destroy another pipe bomb that they had held as evidence after it partially detonated in May 1990 at a lumber mill in Cloverdale about a week before the car bombing. Investigators agreed the two bombs were built by the same person. Ben Rosenfeld, attorney for Darryl Cherney, had requested that an outside lab perform DNA testing on the Cloverdale bomb. The FBI said it had not conducted such testing, and the judge upheld Rosenfeld's request.

== Reception ==
The film premiered at the 2012 San Francisco Green Film Festival.

== Awards ==
- CINE Golden Eagle Award (Documentary Feature 2012)
- Long Island Film Festival (Special Jury Award 2012)
- Malibu International Film Festival (Best Documentary 2012)
- Best Documentary (Santa Cruz Film Festival 2012)
- Best Documentary (Desert Rocks Film Festival 2012)
- Best Feature Film (Davis Film Festival 2012)
