= Redwood Summer =

1990 environmental activist event in California, US

Redwood Summer was a three-month movement in 1990 of environmental activism aimed at protecting old-growth redwood (Sequoia sempervirens) trees from logging by northern California timber companies and was part of the Timber Wars of the 1990s. Organized by Earth First! and the Industrial Workers of the World, it was led by Judi Bari. A protest associated with Redwood Summer took place in June 1990 at the Louisiana Pacific export dock in Samoa, California. Before the protests officially started, the campaign gained international attention on May 24, 1990 when the campaign leader, Judi Bari, and a fellow activist, Darryl Cherney, were involved in a pipe bomb explosion that critically injured them while they were driving through Oakland, California. The explosion led to the FBI accusing Bari of manufacturing and transporting bombs. Due to the FBI not being able to adequately support their claims, she was eventually found innocent. The movement was known to use many controversial techniques to disrupt the logging companies including tree spiking, symbolic protests, and disarming machinery. Though the protests were supposed to remain non-violent, many critics argue that Earth First! is a radical group and the techniques used in the protests are debated.

== The logging companies ==
The campaign of Redwood Summer was an environmental battle to save the old growth forests in Northern California due to the forests' rapid depletion of about 95%. There were two big incidents that caused the Earth First! activists to act.

The first incident was when the California elections were coming up, which included the decision of if California Proposition 130 was to be passed or not. In the summer of 1990, logging companies feared a new law passing in the upcoming November ballot that would make the restrictions tighter for logging practices of the old-growth forests. If Proposition 130 (Restrictions on Logging and Bonds for Forests) passed, it would mean that there would have been new restrictions on logging practices and sale of timber. It would have also authorized the sale of $742 million in bonds to acquire forestlands and for compensation of timber employees. The organizers of Earth First! predicted that the timber companies would increase their logging significantly in the summer in order to get as much timber as possible before the November 1990 ballot. Proposition 130 did not pass.

The second incident began when the news of the Pacific Lumber Company being bought out by Maxxam Inc. was made public. After the company was purchased, they publicized their plan to increase their logging practices by doubling the rate of logging of the old growths forests due to the companies owner, Charles Hurwitz, being in debt after purchasing Pacific Lumber company with junk bonds. Many think that the increase of logging was so Hurwitz could try and get out of his debt.

The Earth First! response was to organize the Redwood Summer protests, to expose destructive practices of big logging companies, and promote stricter laws governing the logging of old growth forests.

== Bari and Cherney car bombing ==
On May 24, 1990, just before the kick off of Redwood Summer, the campaign leader Judi Bari and a fellow activist, Darryl Cherney, were on their way to The Seeds of Peace House, an activist support group in Oakland, California. While Bari was driving, a bomb underneath Bari's seat exploded. After the explosion, both were immediately transported to the hospital. Cherney had serious injuries to his face and a broken wrist, while Bari was in critical condition with a shattered pelvis and internal injuries. She was left permanently disabled due to the injuries she sustained.

After the incident, both Bari and Cherney were charged with transporting an explosive device. The FBI and Oakland Police Department (OPD) claimed that both of the activists had knowledge of the bomb in the vehicle, and the bomb accidentally exploded. After Cherney was treated, he was arrested at the hospital, while Bari remained hospitalized due to her injuries. Both adamantly denied any knowledge or involvement in the bomb. Bari and Cherney claimed that they had received many death threats in the previous weeks, making them believe that the bomb was an assassination attempt. Despite their claims, the FBI and OPD pursued criminal charges against the pair. Despite the accusations, the Redwood Summer campaign quickly gained national attention from the media frenzy over the details of the bombing and the accusations made against the activists, giving the campaign rapid recognition and momentum.

Bari and Cherney's case eventually made it to trial where they were found not guilty, due to the FBI not performing a proper investigation, and lack of evidence. Subsequently Bari and Cherney sued the FBI for violating their constitutional rights. On June 11, 2002, more than twelve years after the bombing, the jury found that the FBI unlawfully violated the pair's first and fourth amendment rights by arresting them, charging them, and searching their homes, and subjected them to defamation of character. The jury awarded Darryl Cherney and the late Judi Bari $4.4 million.

== Earth First! methods during Redwood Summer ==
During Redwood Summer, the Earth First! activists used a variety of methods, including standard protesting techniques, during the campaign. Earth First! activists claimed to be non violent, using civil and passive disobedient actions to save the redwood forests.

=== Tree spiking ===
One of the more controversial tactics that the activists used was tree spiking. Tree spiking was the act of inserting a metal spike in the base of a redwood tree thus making it impossible for loggers to cut down the tree without damaging or destroying their equipment. However, one event made environmental groups, including Earth First!, denounce tree spiking. A factory worker was severely injured and almost lost his life due to the malfunctioning of the machine that he was using. The machine malfunctioned as a result of a spike still being embedded in a piece of wood. After the incident, Earth First! declared that it would stop using tree spiking as means of disrupting the logging industry as it posed threats to human life.

=== Obstruction ===
On multiple occasions, the campaigners used obstructive practices to try to stop the destruction of the redwood forests. In many instances, the activists chained themselves to trees, stood between bulldozers and trees, blocked trucks, and disabled machinery at night.

On one occasion, forty-four activists were arrested in front of the main gate of the Louisiana-Pacific Pulp Mill in Samoa, California. On June 21, 1990, protestors blocked a logging truck that was carrying logged redwoods resulting in the activists’ arrests. After the arrests, however, about twenty other protestors climbed on top of one logging truck, which, blocked twenty-two other logging trucks, halting the production of the logging company.

=== Symbolic actions ===
A consistent tactic that the Earth First! protestors used against the loggers was symbolic actions. On many instances the protestors camouflaged themselves using nature, such as leaves and sticks, and sang Native American war cries. The protestors would also dress in animal costumes and, more particularly, wore costumes and patterns depicting that of the threatened spotted owl. The habitat of the threatened species was in the old growth forests, which, at the time, was threatened by the logging practices.

=== Tree sitting ===
Tree sitting was a strategy used to protect the trees that were marked to be logged down. Activists would camp in the old growth trees, sometimes for extended periods of times, to prevent the trees from being destroyed.

== Timber company employees ==
Due to the protests, the logging practices and factory production slowed down and, sometimes, were at a standstill. The drop of profit made Louisiana-Pacific fire some of their employees, which, caused even greater tension between the Redwood Summer protestors and the employees of the timber companies. Not only did the employees fear losing their jobs, some employees stated that the actions of Earth First! against the logging industry tarnished their family legacy and some claimed that they feared going to work.

The growing agitation between the environmentalist and the loggers caused confrontation between the two groups. There were instances where the activists said to have filed charges with the police because some loggers were hostile towards them. The protestors also report that workers threw rocks at them and one activist was hit with the handle of an axe. On another occasion, a logger severely beat an activist. At times, the protestors reported that some of the workers threw eggs at them, spat on them, and verbally threaten them. Despite this, however, protestors also report that many of the loggers they encountered disagreed with them, but were respectful and friendly.

Some employees also admitted to fearing their job security due to the clear cutting of trees because if there are no trees left to log, they don't have a job.

== Aftermath ==
Though more attention has been brought to the depletion of the old-growth forests in California and more regulations are in place to protect the forests, logging of the forests continues. The Redwood Summer campaign gained international attention and made many people aware of the destruction of the old growth forests.
