= Lisa Bari =

American health policy strategist and consultant

- Education: University of California, Berkeley (B.A.); Purdue University (M.B.A.); Harvard T.H. Chan School of Public Health (M.P.H.)
- Parents: Mike Sweeney (father); Judi Bari (mother)
- Family: Ruth Aaronson Bari; Gina Kolata
- Website: www.healthcareitpolicy.com

Lisa Bari is an American health policy strategist and consultant. For a period, she served as the lead of health information technology and interoperability at the federal Centers for Medicare and Medicaid Services Innovation Center (CMS).

== Education ==
Bari received her Bachelor of Arts (BA) in Cognitive Science from UC Berkeley, and later earned a Master of Business Administration (MBA) from Purdue University. She earned a Master of Public Health (MPH) from the Harvard T.H. Chan School of Public Health.

== Career ==
Bari began her career in digital marketing and technology with companies like Art.com and Practice Fusion, where she had her first experience working in health care.

Through her role at CMS, a federal health agency, Bari spearheaded new health information technology policies for the Comprehensive Primary Care Plus Model.

She also helped write the CMS Interoperability and Patient Access Proposed Rule. She executed the CMS Artificial Intelligence Health Outcomes Challenge, a competition with a $1.65M reward, which stimulated the development of tools with CMS data that best predict patient health outcomes.

Bari left CMS in 2019 to pursue independent consulting, specializing in health information technology and improving payment models for health care providers.

=== Advocacy ===
She is an advocate for health equity and patient and provider access. She has frequent public discussions on social media platforms such as Twitter, addressing such topics as the effects of low household income on healthcare accessibility, the framework of HIPAA regulations, and the navigability of Medicare's digital systems.
