= David Foreman =

American environmentalist (1947–2022)

- Born: October 18, 1946; Albuquerque, New Mexico, U.S.
- Died: September 19, 2022 (aged 75); Albuquerque, New Mexico, U.S.
- Other name: Dave Foreman
- Education: San Antonio Junior College, University of New Mexico
- Known for: Activism, writing
- Movement: Radical environmentalism, nativism
- Spouses: Debbie Sease (m. 1976, divorced) Nancy Morton (m. 1986; died 2021)

William David Foreman (October 18, 1946 – September 19, 2022) was an American advocate for the conservation of wild lands and wildlife. He was a co-founder of three organizations: Earth First!, the Wildlands Project, and the Rewilding Institute. A prominent member of the radical environmentalism movement beginning in the 1980s, his advocacy and actions shifted in the early 1990s into collaborations with professionals in the field of conservation biology.

== Early life and education ==
William David Foreman was born on October 18, 1946, in Albuquerque, New Mexico. His father was a United States Air Force sergeant and later an air traffic controller. Foreman attended San Antonio Junior College before transferring to the University of New Mexico, from which he graduated in 1967 with a degree in history.

== Early career ==
In his early life he was active in conservative politics, campaigning for Barry Goldwater and forming the Young Americans for Freedom conservative youth chapter on his junior college campus. In 1968, Foreman joined the U.S. Marine Corps' Marine Officer Candidates School in Quantico, Virginia, and received an undesirable discharge after 61 days. He then worked as a teacher at a Zuni Indian reservation in New Mexico, where he also worked as a farrier.

== Activism and environmentalist work ==
=== The Wilderness Society ===
Between 1973 and 1980, he worked for The Wilderness Society as Southwest Regional Representative in New Mexico and the Director of Wilderness Affairs in Washington, D.C.

=== Earth First! ===
In April 1980, Foreman and friends Howie Wolke, Ron Kezar, Bart Koehler, and Mike Roselle took a week-long hiking trip in the Pinacate Desert. It was during this trip that Foreman is believed to have coined the phrase "Earth First!" The movement that subsequently bore that name was inspired, in some part, by the writings of Edward Abbey, author of the novel The Monkey Wrench Gang. The group used direct action tactics, and in contrast with the cautious lobbying efforts of the established environmental organizations, "monkeywrenching"—industrial sabotage traditionally associated with labor struggles—would become the chief tactic of the Earth First! movement in the 1980s. The Earth First! Journal, which grew out of the Earth First! newsletter, was edited by Foreman. In its first issue, Foreman set out the organization's goals: "We will not make political compromises. Let the other outfits do that. EARTH FIRST will set forth the pure, hard-line, radical position of those who believe in the Earth first." Some mainstream environmentalists and others accused Foreman of promoting eco-terrorism.

In 1990, Foreman was one of five people arrested by the Federal Bureau of Investigation following operation THERMCON, in which FBI agents infiltrated an Arizona Earth First! group, encouraging them to sabotage a powerline feeding a water pumping station. While Foreman had no direct role in the attempted sabotage, he ultimately pleaded guilty to a misdemeanor for handing two copies of Ecodefense: A Field Guide to Monkeywrenching to an FBI informant, and received a suspended sentence.

By the late 1980s, Earth First! had split into two ideological factions; Foreman and others adhered to a biocentrist view characterized by "apocalyptic biodiversity" but were increasingly challenged by a "millenarianist social justice faction" influenced by the movement's Northern California-based members, including Roselle (who was based in Berkeley) and Judi Bari (of Mendocino County). After less than a decade, Foreman left Earth First!, disillusioned by the changing character of the organization. Foreman described himself "a redneck for the environment" and objected to the left-wing, social justice-oriented approach of younger environmental activists who had joined the group. Foreman and his wife, Nancy Morton, publicly split with Earth First! in 1990, writing in a letter at the time that the group had taken on an "overtly counterculture/anti-establishment style" influenced by the group's California wing. Roselle, in turn, denounced Foreman as "an unrepentant right-wing thug."

=== After leaving Earth First! ===
After leaving Earth First!, Foreman co-founded the Wildlands Network in 1991. The group aimed to establish a network of protected wilderness areas across North America. In 2003, Foreman later created a think tank, the Rewilding Institute. The New Mexico-based institute promoted policy proposals for long-term land conservation.

From 1996 to 1998, he served on the Sierra Club's board of directors, but departed after the organization rejected his proposed policy on restrictive immigration.

=== Controversy ===
In a 1986 interview, Foreman said the United States should not provide aid for the Ethiopia famine and hunger crisis, but rather, "let nature seek its own balance." He later clarified his position, stating, "I have serious doubts and nagging questions about conventional 'humanitarian' foreign aid responses to the increasing problem of famine in the Third World. That is what I was trying to get at in my comments on famine in Ethiopia. In my oft-quoted remark about famine in Ethiopia, however, I failed to clearly make this point. Indeed, I implied through my sloppy, off-the-cuff remark that famine was purely a biological question of too many people and too few resources, completely unrelated to social organization, economic exploitation, or international relations. I also implied that the best possible social response was for us to do nothing, offer no assistance of any kind, and to just let the hungry starve. I very much regret the way I phrased these comments. Standing by themselves, out of context, they sound truly cold hearted."

Foreman was criticized for his anti-immigration statements, such as when he said, “letting the USA be an overflow valve for problems in Latin America is not solving a thing. It’s just putting more pressure on the resources we have in the USA." He later sought to clarify his statements by saying, "While I still believe that massive and unlimited immigration into any country is a serious problem, I do not support beefing up the Border Patrol and the other agencies that try to keep Latin Americans out of this country. I do not think that this is a realistic or ethical response to the underlying problem." He went on to say, "While I agree that the population question can be approached in narrow, racist, and fascistic ways, I strenuously reject the idea that any and all ecologically-grounded concerns about human overpopulation are racist and fascist. Is it racist and fascist, for example, to propose making birth control methods and devices, including the French abortion pill and sterilization, freely available to any woman or man in the world who desires them?"

Some of the goals of the Wildlands Network have been characterized as "lofty scientific ideals" since it could take 100 years to realize some outcomes. Its founders, including Foreman, replied that they "did not want to compete with existing conservation groups. They wanted to create a framework those groups could work within and a clearinghouse for information and science."

== Philosophy and sense of the sacred ==
A year after Foreman's death, a set of appreciative essays was published. Bron Taylor contributed a remembrance that included excerpts from personal interviews he had recorded in 1990 and 1993:

1990: "I agree with Aldo Leopold about virtually everything. A thing is right when it tends to advance the beauty, stability, and integrity of the natural community," and we should "protect the earth because we love it," noting that this was what Leopold was expressing when he wrote, "There are those who can live without wild things and sunsets and there are those who cannot." After quoting Leopold, Foreman added, "I think that's fundamentally the key. When you really love wild things, you recognize that your own life does not have meaning apart from those things."

1993: "It's very difficult in our society to discuss the notion of sacred apart from the supernatural. I think that's something that we need to work on, a non-supernatural concept of sacred; a non-theistic basis of sacred. When I say I'm a non-theistic pantheist it's a recognition that what's really important is the flow of life, the process of life.... [So] the idea is not to protect ecosystems frozen in time ... but [rather] the grand process ... of evolution.... We're just blips in this vast energy field ... just temporary manifestations of this life force, which is blind and non-teleological. And so I guess what is sacred is what's in harmony with that flow."

== Personal life and death ==
Foreman formerly lived in Tucson, Arizona. He married Debbie Sease in 1976; they subsequently divorced. He married Nancy Morton in 1986, and she died in 2021.

Foreman died in Albuquerque on September 19, 2022, from interstitial lung disease at the age of 75. He remained active in environmentalist causes until his death.

== Bibliography ==
- Foreman, Dave (1991). Confessions of an Eco-Warrior. Crown. ISBN 0-517-88058-X.
- Foreman, Dave (1992). The Big Outside: A Descriptive Inventory of the Big Wilderness Areas of the United States. Three Rivers Press. ISBN 978-0517587379.
- Foreman, Dave (2004). Rewilding North America: A Vision For Conservation In The 21St Century. Island Press. ISBN 9781559630610.
- Foreman, Dave (2004). The Lobo Outback Funeral Home: A Novel. Doug Peacock (Foreword). Bower House. ISBN 978-1555663391.
- Foreman, Dave (2011). Man Swarm and the Killing of Wildlife. Ravens Eye Press. ISBN 978-0981658476.
- Foreman, Dave (2012). Take Back Conservation. Ravens Eye Press. ISBN 978-0984005635.
- Foreman, Dave (2014). The Great Conservation Divide: Conservation vs. Resourcism on America's Public Lands. Ravens Eye Press. ISBN 9780990782612.
- Contributor to Cafaro, Philip; Crist, Eileen, eds. (2012). "The Great Backtrack". Life on the Brink: Environmentalists Confront Overpopulation. University of Georgia Press. ISBN 9780820343853.
- Foreman, Dave and Carroll, Laura (2015). Man Swarm: How Overpopulation is Killing the Wild World. LiveTrue Books. ISBN 978-0-9863832-0-5 ISBN 978-0-9863832-1-2.
