= Wildlands Network =

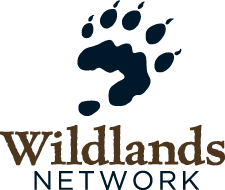
- Founded: 1991
- Founder: Michael E. Soulé, David Foreman, Douglas Tompkins
- Type: Non-governmental organization
- Purpose: Environmentalism
- Location: Salt Lake City, Utah (international)
- Region served: North America
- Method: Conservation, conservation biology research
- Key people: Katie Davis, executive director; Fred Koontz, president
- Website: http://www.wildlandsnetwork.org/
- Formerly called: North American Wilderness Recovery Strategy, Wildlands Project

The Wildlands Network (formerly known as “Wildlands Project") was created in 1991 to stem the tide of species extinctions that was being recorded across North America. Evidence that such extinctions were often exacerbated by a lack of habitat connectivity between existing protected areas resulted in the organization’s adoption of a primary mission focused on scientific and strategic support for creation of “networks of people protecting networks of connected wildlands.”

== History ==
Dr. Michael E. Soulé, a conservation biologist who wanted to merge science with action. In 1991, Soulé co-founded the North American Wilderness Recovery Strategy with radical environmentalist David Foreman, and wildlands philanthropist Douglas Tompkins. The name would later become simplified to the Wildlands Project, now known as Wildlands Network.

One early goal was the conservation of habitat and the creation and maintenance of migration corridors for wildlife, primarily focused on North America. Since its founding, Wildlands Network has worked to simplify conservation terms in order for the public to understand them and helped universalize the language for conservation planning. The Wildlands Network has helped inspire many other conservation organizations across the world.

== Priorities and campaigns ==
As a demonstration of where large landscape-scale habitat connectivity in North America was most needed, Wildlands Network identified four “Continental Wildways” traversing the Pacific and Atlantic coastlines, the Canadian Boreal Forest region, and the “Spine of the Continent” between Alaska and Mexico.

Over the period of 2000-2006, Wildlands Network scientists and associated conservation organizations mapped six regional “Wildlands Network Designs” (WNDs) within those corridors in the Rocky Mountain West and the Northern Appalachians. These conservation plans identified existing protected areas and proposed wildlife corridors that would connect them as pathways for wide-ranging (keystone) species in need of “room to roam.” The plans also described the various positive ecological impacts that these species had on other flora and fauna.

In recent years, Wildlands Network moved from a focus on continued creation of WNDs to guiding implementation of the recommendations in the six existing plans. The organization developed a network of public and private individuals, groups, and agencies working in the regions covered by the WNDs to accomplish this goal. Initiatives currently focus on connecting habitat in the Western (Spine of Continent) and Eastern (Atlantic) Wildways.

== Projects ==
=== Eastern Wildway ===
The proposed corridor, Eastern Wildway would connect the Adirondacks, the Great Smoky Mountains, the Appalachians (including the Northern Appalachian Corridor), and the Everglades. It is made up of public lands, such as national parks and nature preserves. In order to have the greatest impact on migrating wildlife and threatened ecosystems, key areas of importance have been identified in the proposed corridor, known as the “Essential 16”. In 2015, the Eastern Wildway Network was formed in order to advance efforts in North America. Over 30 conservation leaders have partnered in order to aid the conservation efforts and introducing essential species back into the area, like wolves and cougars. The partnership serves to open more opportunities for the Eastern Wildway campaign to reach its goals.

=== Western Wildway ===
Western Wildway, also known as the Spine of the Continent Initiative, this is a proposed 6,000 mile swath that will stretch from the Brooks Range in Alaska, down the Rockies through Canada and the United States, to the Sierra Madre Occidental in Mexico.

=== Pacific Wildway ===
The Pacific Wildway proposal runs the length of the Pacific Coast from Baja, Mexico to where the Coast Range converges with the Rockies, where it connects to the Western Wildway.

=== Boreal Wildway ===
Boreal Wildway also known as the Canadian Boreal Initiative, this proposal would encompass most of the 1.2 billion acre North American Taiga biome in Canada. This area is of particular importance due to its function as a carbon sink (with slower decomposition rates, the Boreal forest can sequester carbon more efficiently than its temperate and tropical counterparts, such as the Amazon rainforest) and its large swaths of unaltered landscapes from coast to coast.

== Controversy ==
Some of the science used for decision making within the Wildlands Network has been questioned, and termed, "lofty scientific ideals" since it could take 100 years to realize an outcome.

One of the co-founders of Wildlands Network, David Foreman, has a history of anti-immigration, Nativism statements.

== See also ==
- Conservation movement
- Conservation biology
- Rewilding
- Habitat conservation
- Habitat destruction
- Habitat fragmentation
- Environmental protection
- Northern Rockies Ecosystem Protection Act
