= Rumours of Glory (book) =

2014 autobiography by Bruce Cockburn

- Authors: Bruce Cockburn, Greg King
- Language: English
- Subject: autobiography
- Genre: music
- Published: 2014 (HarperCollins)
- Publication place: Canada
- Media type: Print (hardcover)
- Pages: 544
- ISBN: 9780061969126

Rumours of Glory is the 2014 autobiography of Canadian musician Bruce Cockburn, written by Cockburn and journalist Greg King.

== Synopsis ==
Alongside detailing his musical career, Cockburn discusses his activism in the fields of human rights and environmental issues, the evolution of his Christian faith, and his relationships and family. He also includes discussions of how his experiences were reflected in his song lyrics.

== Publication ==
HarperCollins released the hardcover edition on 4 November 2014.

== Reception ==
Maclean's review of the book noted that "[i]t's hard to imagine a more Canadian memoir". Morley Walker of the Winnipeg Free Press generally regarded Rumours of Glory as "a rewarding read, candid and erudite, even where it is a bit plodding". Brian Doyle of The Christian Century noted that Cockburn's book was one of a few "beautifully written and piercing memoirs" by musicians, adding that it was also "uniquely thoughtful and eloquent about the author's Christian faith and how it informs his life and work".
