= Lundberg v. County of Humboldt =

Lundberg v. County of Humboldt was a United States District Court for the Northern District of California decision issued on April 29, 2005, which arose out of a protest dispute in 1997 between environmental activists for the Headwaters Forest and the Sheriff's Deputies of Humboldt County, California. During three protests in the Fall of 1997, police officers tortured activists by swabbing pepper spray in the eyes of eight activists practicing nonviolent resistance. The action taken by the police was later unanimously ruled to be excessive force and a violation of the Fourth Amendment to the United States Constitution.

The jurors in the trial were clearly shaken after watching a video of the victims sitting helplessly while police pulled their heads back by the hair and dabbed the chemical in their eyes over their screams, and the plaintiffs, who had experienced it and then had to watch it in the two preceding trials, had to suffer through it once more. Some of the victims were not even 18 years old. The video demonstrated the claims of the plaintiffs that police were inflicting punishment on them while they were clearly engaged in peaceful protest and were not a threat to anyone. An expert witness testified at the trial that the incident represented a "classic case of police brutality" and "grotesque abuse". One of the plaintiffs described that one of the clear messages from the trial was about "police brutality and torture and what's acceptable behavior of one human being to another."

== History ==
In three incidents, the first on September 25, 1997, in the office lobby of Pacific Lumber Company in Scotia, California, the second at a Pacific Lumber logging site in Bear Creek on October 3, 1997, and a third incident at the Eureka district office of Congressman Frank Riggs on October 16, 1997, County sheriff's deputies stuck pepper spray drenched Q-tips into the protesters' eyes to try to coerce them to end the protest. Meeting resistance, a second dose of pepper spray, and then sprayed, some of them directly in the eyes with canisters held a few inches from the protestors faces.

The plaintiffs charged that the Sheriff used excessive force.

The first trial occurred in August 1998 in U.S. District Court in San Francisco, presided by Judge Vaughn Walker and ended in a deadlock. Judge Walker then threw the case out.

The plaintiffs appealed to the U.S. 9th Circuit Court of Appeals, based in San Francisco. Headwaters Forest Defense v. Humboldt County, 240 F.3d 1185, 1197 (9th Cir. 2001) ("Headwaters I"). On May 5, 2000, the court denying qualified immunity to Sheriff and Chief Deputy and overturning the summary judgment, thus giving an opportunity for a new trial. No. 98-17250, D.C. No. CV-97-03989-VRW The defendants appealed to the U. S. Supreme Court and the case was sent back to the 9th Circuit for reconsideration, which again ruled in favor of the plaintiffs. The defendants again appealed all the way to the Supreme Court, which was then denied.

The second trial (Headwaters II, 276 F.3d at 1131.) began Sept. 8, 2004, presided by U.S. District Judge Susan Illston, but resulted in a hung jury.

The third trial began April 11, 2005 resulting in a victory for the plaintiffs. The plaintiffs won a jury trial, but were awarded only $1 per person in damages.

== In popular culture ==
A reference to this incident is made in a 1999 episode of The Simpsons titled "Homer to the Max". In where Homer Simpson (renamed "Max Power"), Marge Simpson, and Ed Begley Jr. chain themselves to redwood trees in the hope to save them from destruction.
