= Michael E. Soulé =

American biologist (1936–2020)

Michael Ellman Soulé (May 28, 1936 – June 17, 2020) was an American biologist, known for his work in promoting the idea of conservation biology.

Soulé was born in San Diego, California, the son of Berenice (Ellman) and Herman Herzoff. His father died when he was two, and he was adopted by his stepfather Alan Soulé. He earned a Ph.D. in 1964 at Stanford University in Biology under Paul R. Ehrlich, and later became Research Professor (Emeritus) in Environmental Studies, University of California, Santa Cruz. His Ph.D. thesis of 167 pages was entitled: Evolution and population phenetics of the side-blotched lizards (Uta stansburiana and its relatives) on the islands in the Gulf of California, Mexico.

Soulé was a cofounder and first president of the Society for Conservation Biology, founded in 1985. He served on the board of Round River Conservation Studies and the Wildlands Network.

Soulé co-edited with Gary Lease a book of essays titled Reinventing nature?: responses to postmodern deconstruction (1995), which was a response to the arguments presented by environmental historian William Cronon and others in Uncommon ground: toward reinventing nature (1995). He has most recently spoken out against approaches to environmental conservation that discount the value of species diversity.
