= Eco Warriors Movement =

Non Governmental Organization in Ghana

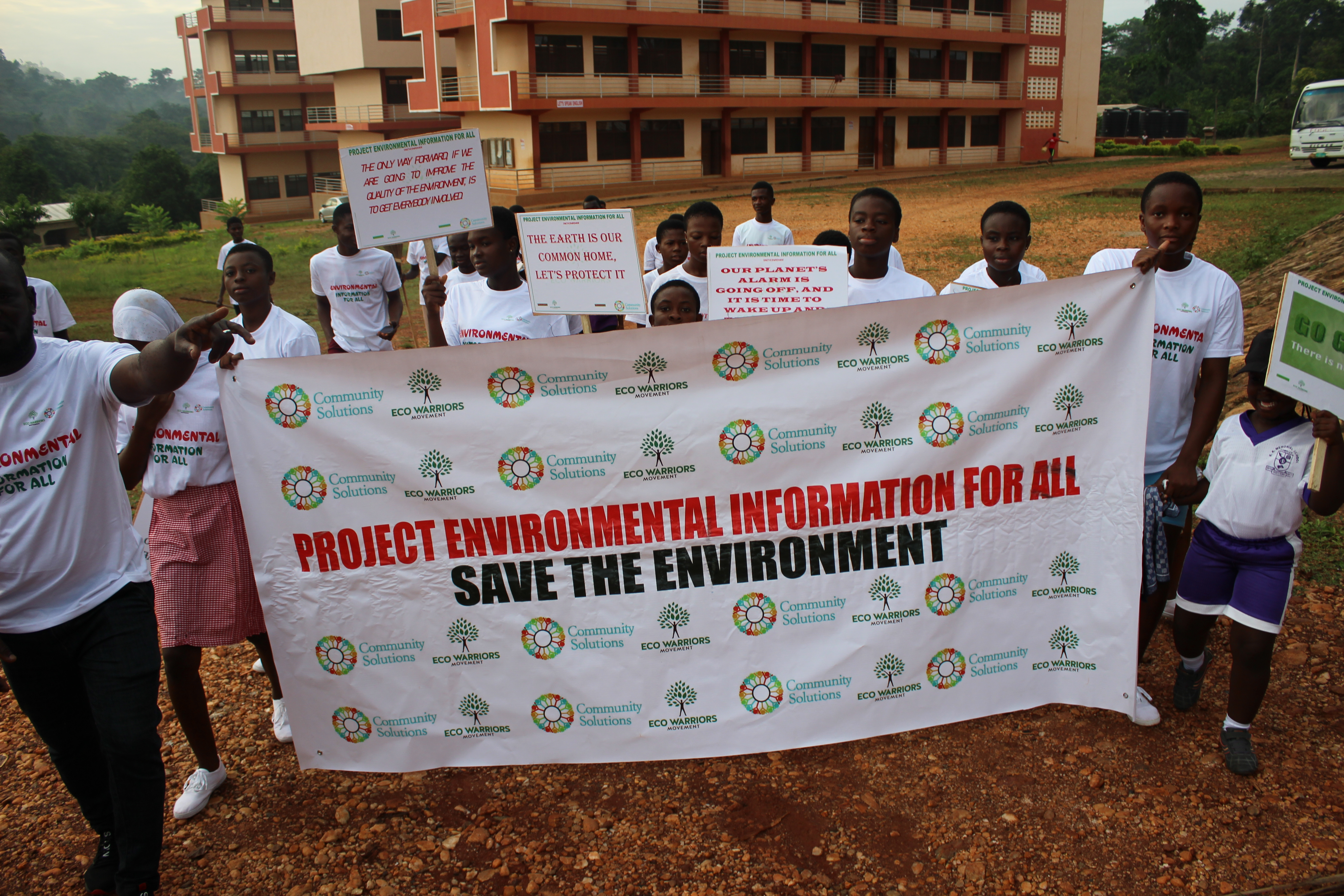
Eco Warriors Movement

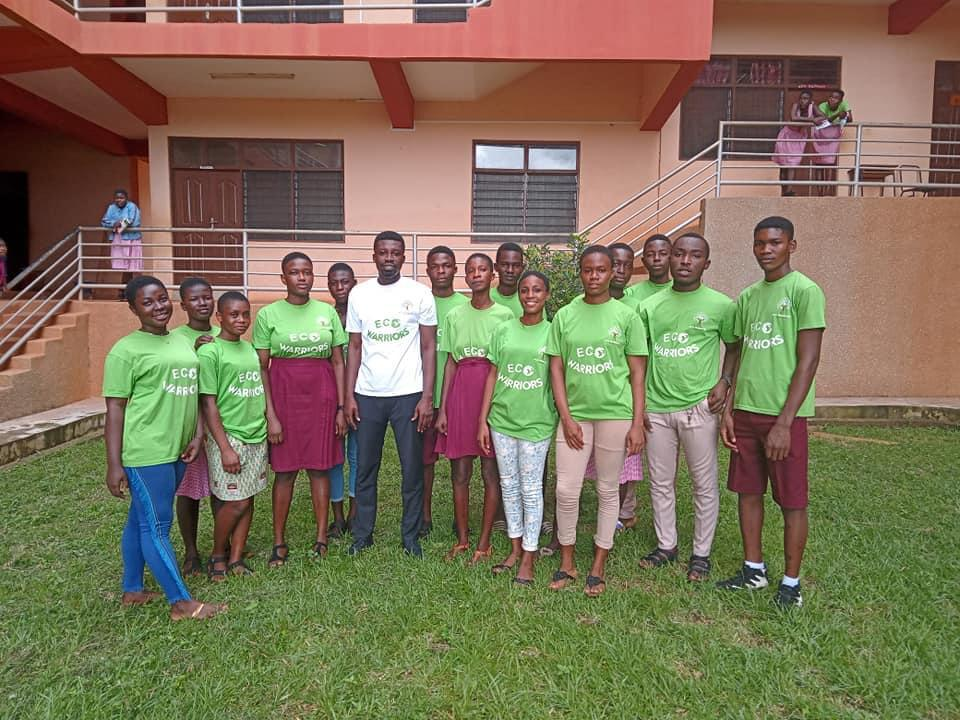
Eco Warriors at Fodoa Senior High School in the Eastern Region of Ghana

Eco Warrior Movement is a non-governmental organization in Ghana working with young people on climate change and environmental sustainability. The movement is a youth-driven and youth-led organization that is intended on restoring degraded landscapes and mitigate climate change through an integrated and inclusive approach. Otuo-Akyampong Boakye, an environmental scientist from Ghana, launched the Eco-Warriors Movement in 2020.

== Activities ==
1. Climate Smart Tree: The project uses the science of tree planting to innovatively cleanse ambient air, sequester carbon, create habitat for arboreal organisms and initiate pockets of urban forest around sanitation-related areas like refuse dumps and public toilets in urban areas in Ghana.

2. Environmental Storytelling: The storytelling project uses storytelling as a tool to communicate environmental knowledge and educate young people, sharing our childhood memories on how nature provided for us and ensured our socialization in community settings.

3. Eco Club Formation: complement the efforts by the educational system to educate students on environmental sustainability and climate change by forming clubs in schools where students can interact and engage to find solutions to the environmental challenges in their communities.

4. Using Open Knowledge to promote environmental education leveraging the Wikimedia projects.

== Awards ==
1. Best SDG13 Advocate in Ghana
2. WeAreTogetherPrize winner
3. Falling Walls Engage Lab winner
