= Ecodefense =

Instructional book for environmental defense and sabotage

- Cover of the 1987 second edition.
- Author: Dave Foreman
- Publisher: Ned Ludd Books
- Publication date: 1985

Ecodefense: A Field Guide to Monkeywrenching is a book edited by Dave Foreman (and Bill Haywood in later editions), with a foreword by Edward Abbey.

== Background ==
Much of the inspiration for the book, as well as the term "monkeywrenching", came from Edward Abbey's 1975 novel The Monkey Wrench Gang. Other inspiration for the book likely came from the 1972 book Ecotage!, which was published by the group Environmental Action and was in turn inspired by the actions of an activist in the Chicago, Illinois area who called himself "The Fox", and engaged in such vigilante actions to protect the environment as plugging smokestacks. The Fox named after the Fox River northwest of Chicago was an avid historical boater who educated and demonstrated Native American and early trapper fishing and boating techniques.

The Fox was radicalized and became a founding mentor of the Earth Liberation Front movement after witnessing toxic dumping into the Fox River over decades which polluted the river to near-death. The Fox became infamous after dumping a bucket of said toxic waste upon the desk of a Stone Container Corporation executive in Chicago. The Fox was rumored also to plug drainage pipes from toxic industrial plants from his canoe along the Fox River. Much of the actual content for Ecodefense came from the "Dear Ned Ludd" column in the Earth First! newsletter during the 1980s.

This book was banned in Australia, gazetted in 1992 as "refused classification" and a prohibited import.

== Publication history ==
Ned Ludd Books published the first edition in 1985 and the second edition, revised and enlarged, in 1987. Abbzug Press in Chico, California published the third edition. Bill Haywood joined Dave Foreman as editor for the second and subsequent editions.

== See also ==
- Earth Liberation Front
- Eco-Terrorism
- Operation Backfire – FBI operation initiated against eco-terrorism
