= Earth First! (magazine) =

Environmental magazine

- Categories: Environmentalism, biocentrism, deep ecology, green anarchy
- Founded: 1980
- Country: United States
- Based in: Lawrence, Kansas
- Language: English

Earth First!: The Journal of Ecological Resistance, is the official publication of the Earth First! movement. First published as a newsletter in 1980, it has existed alongside the movement as a way to spread commonly held beliefs in Earth First! culture, such as biocentrism, deep ecology, and direct action. The magazine is also commonly known as the Earth First! Journal and is based in Lawrence, Kansas.
