= Darryl Cherney =

20th and 21st-century American environmentalist, musician, and presidential candidate

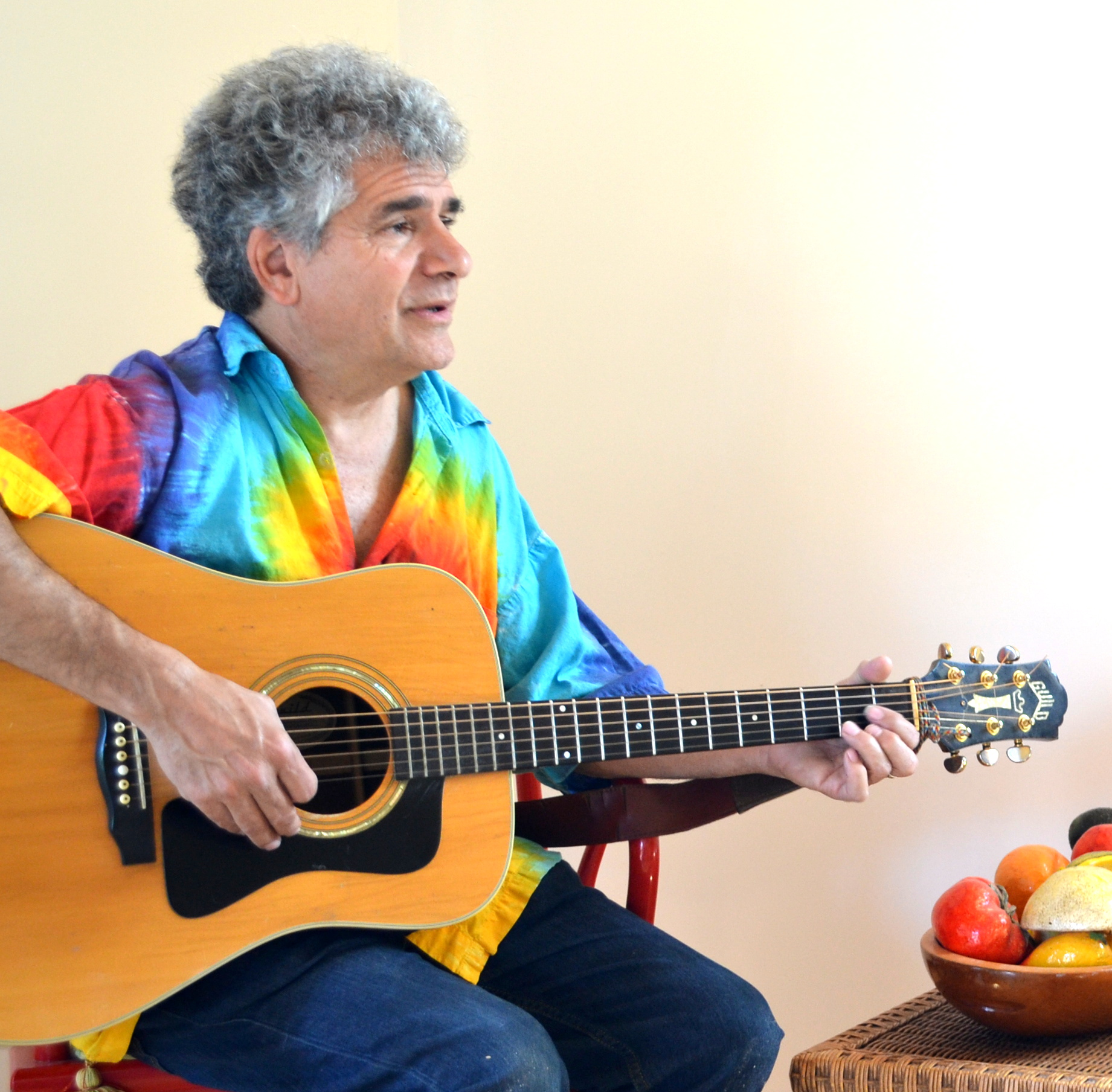
- Darryl Cherney playing guitar, May 2015
- Born: 1956 (age 69–70); New York City, New York, United States
- Occupations: Musician and activist
- Political party: Green
- Other political affiliations: Democratic (formerly)

Darryl Cherney (born 1956) is an American musician and environmental activist. He is a member of the Earth First! environmental movement. Born and raised in New York City, he lives in Humboldt County, California.

Cherney has produced five albums of his own political satire, and founded Environmentally Sound Promotions and Churn It Up Records. Together with Greg King, in 1986 he co-founded the movement to save what eventually became the federally protected Headwaters Forest Reserve near Eureka, California, which was formally established on March 1, 1999, and is managed by the Bureau of Land Management. He organized four rallies in support of Julia Butterfly Hill's two-year tree sit. He organized the Redwood Summer campaign with Judi Bari.

One of Cherney's songs, "Where Are We Gonna Work (When the Trees Are Gone?)", has been covered by Jello Biafra and Mojo Nixon on their album Prairie Home Invasion.

== Political campaigns ==
Cherney ran for Congress in the 1988 Democratic primary in Northern California.

In 2016 Cherney ran for the Green Party presidential nomination. He ran a "no money in politics" campaign on social media, featuring the hashtag #FeelTheChern.

== Personal life ==
During the late 1980s, Cherney met fellow environmental activist Judi Bari. He was a musician, and Bari put him to work accompanying some of the protests of Earth First!, which she was leading. She wanted to emphasize non-violence in the group's protests. In earlier years, it had been known for actions that risked injury to loggers.

She was divorced and for a time, the pair had a close relationship. Later they remained good friends and colleagues in their work to protect the redwood forests and organize timber workers.

== 1990 Pipe bomb and aftermath ==
Cherney was active in the Earth First! environmental movement, where he worked closely with prominent organizer Judi Bari. On May 24, 1990, he and Bari were traveling together in her car when a pipe bomb exploded beneath her seat. They were both injured, Bari severely. The case was investigated by the Oakland police and Federal Bureau of Investigation (FBI), which arrested the two activists. Although the FBI did not finally charge them, it suggested from its investigation that they were carrying the bomb to be used in another bombing action, and it had gone off accidentally.

Bari and Cherney subsequently filed a civil rights suit in 1991 against the FBI and Oakland Police Department for violations of the United States Constitution during their investigation of the incident. They said that law enforcement, in suggesting that they were carrying a bomb they had made, was trying to destroy their reputations and damage the environmental movement working to protect redwood forests in Northern California.

Journalist Stephen Talbot produced a documentary Who Killed Judi Bari? (1991) for San Francisco public television station KQED. In the course of making it, he interviewed Cherney, Bari and her friends and associates, and many others. In the documentary he explored their contention that the bombing was the work of corporate lumber interests or the FBI trying to suppress the environmental movement in the region. He also touched on suggestions that Michael Sweeney, Bari's ex-husband, or others were involved. Bari strongly denied that publicly.

Talbot reported on these events again in a 2002 article in Salon magazine, when the trial in Oakland was underway. He said that in 1991, Bari had privately told him "in confidence" that she suspected her ex-husband Sweeney of the bombing of her car. He kept her confidentiality as a source at the time, but believed that her death had released him from that restriction.

Sweeney was a former member of Venceremos, a radical group in the early 1970s in the Bay Area. Bari also told Talbot in 1991 that she had suspected Sweeney of a 1980 arson and bombing incident at the Santa Rosa Airport. Afterward area activists worked to prevent the airport from being converted into a larger commercial enterprise. Ed Gehrman also published material about these issues in 2002.

In 2012, Cherney told KHUM radio that he does not consider himself an "extremist," preferring the term "radical."

That same year, Cherney produced his own documentary film, directed by Mary Liz Thomson, Who Bombed Judi Bari? (2012).

In addition, Cherney and his attorney gained a court order to prevent the FBI from destroying evidence it was holding from what is called the Cloverdale bombing, which occurred in 1990 about a week prior to the bombing of Bari's car. Investigators had concluded that evidence from the partially detonated bomb suggested it was made by the same person as the Bari bomb. The FBI said they never analyzed DNA from the bomb. Cherney sought to have DNA and other forensic evidence assessed with current techniques that might help identify the bombmaker in these cases. Cherney said in a Democracy Now! interview that he believes the FBI was guilty not only of framing him and Bari but of a cover-up of related evidence. Cherney has stated elsewhere that “I believe the bomber is findable.”

== Discography ==
=== By Cherney ===
==== Albums ====
- I Had To Be Born This Century (Churn It Up, 1987, 2004)
- They Sure Don't Make Hippies Like They Used To (Churn It Up, 1989, 2004)
- Timber (Churn It Up, 1991, 2004) - with Judi Bari & George Shook
- Who Bombed Judi Bari? (soundtrack, 1997)
- White Tribal Music (Churn It Up, 1999)
- Real American (Churn It Up, 2004) - Darryl Cherney & The Chernobles

==== Singles ====
- Bush It! (Alternative Tentacles, 2002) - Darryl Cherney & The Chernobles

=== With contributions by Cherney ===
- If A Tree Falls (Rhino Entertainment, 1996) by various artists – Cherney contributes "You Can't Clearcut Your Way To Heaven"
