= Earth First! =

Environmental advocacy group

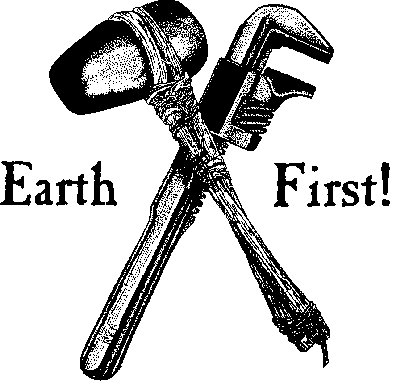
- Abbreviation: EF!
- Founded: April 4, 1980; 46 years ago
- Founder: Dave Foreman; Mike Roselle; Howie Wolke; Bart Koehler; Ron Kezar
- Purpose: Environmental protection
- Location: Active in over 19 countries
- Origins: Southwestern United States
- Method: Direct action, Eco-sabotage
- Website: earthfirst.news

Earth First! is a environmental advocacy group that originated in the Southwestern United States. It was founded in 1980 by Dave Foreman, Mike Roselle, Howie Wolke, Bart Koehler, and Ron Kezar.

Inspired by several environmental writings, including Rachel Carson's Silent Spring, Aldo Leopold's land ethic, and Edward Abbey's The Monkey Wrench Gang, a small group of environmental activists composed of Dave Foreman, ex-Yippie Mike Roselle, Wyoming Wilderness Society representatives Bart Koehler and Howie Wolke, and Bureau of Land Management employee Ron Kezar, united to form Earth First. While traveling in Foreman's VW bus from the El Pinacate y Gran Desierto de Altar Biosphere Reserve in northern Mexico to Albuquerque, New Mexico, the group pledged, "No compromise in defense of Mother Earth!".

The co-founders of the group were called to action during the second "Roadless Area Review and Evaluation" (RARE II) by the U.S. Forest Service, which they considered a sell-out by mainstream environmental advocates. The activists envisioned a revolutionary movement, with the goal to set aside multi-million-acre ecological preserves all across the United States. Their ideas drew upon the concepts of conservation biology, which had been developing for over twenty years by notable scientists like E. O. Wilson; however, mainstream environmental groups were slow to embrace the new science. These events and ideologies coalesced after a grueling hike, as the men were headed toward Albuquerque. After "Foreman called out 'Earth First!', Roselle drew a clenched fist logo, passed it up to the front of the van, and there was Earth First!".

== Early years, from 1980–1989 ==
Earth First was founded on April 4, 1980, by Dave Foreman, Mike Roselle, Howie Wolke, Bart Koehler, and Ron Kezar.

During the group's early years (1980–1986), Earth First mixed publicity stunts (such as rolling a plastic "crack" down Glen Canyon Dam) with far-reaching wilderness proposals that reportedly surpassed the actions that mainstream environmental groups were willing to take (relying on conservation biology research from a biocentric perspective). The group's proposals were published in a periodical, Earth First! The Radical Environmental Journal, informally known as the Earth First! Journal. Edward Abbey often spoke at early gatherings, and his inspirational writings led him to be revered by the early movement. An annual gathering of the group was known as the Round River Rendezvous, with the name taken from an Ojibwa myth about a continuous river of life flowing into and out of itself and sustaining all relations. The rendezvous is a celebration with art and music, as well as an activist conference with workshops and recounts of past actions. Musicians such as Dana Lyons, Judi Bari, Daryl Cherney, Joanne Rand, Bart Koehler, Casey Neill and others performed regularly on Earth First! promotional roadshows as well as at gatherings, protests and blockades. Another project led by the organization at this time was the creation of Earth First! Foundation, a tax-deductible fund which was established to provide financial support for research, advocacy and education by Earth First activists. The fund was later renamed the Fund for Wild Nature in 1991.

In the spring of 1985, a nationwide call to action against the logging company Willamette Industries, published in the Earth First! Journal, brought Earth First members from around the United States to the Willamette National Forest of Western Oregon. After finding road blockades (carried out by Corvallis-based Cathedral Forest Action Group) were not an efficient form of protection against logging, Marylander Ron Huber and Washingtonian Mike Jakubal devised tree sitting as a more effective civil disobedience alternative.

On May 23, 1985, Mike Jakubal led the first Earth First tree sit. When U.S. Forest Service law enforcement official Steve Slagowski arrived, Mike Roselle, Ron Huber, and others were arrested for sitting at the base of the tree in support. The first "tree-sitting" lasted less than a day—Jakubal came down in the evening to look over the remains of the forest that had been cut down around him, and was arrested by a hidden Forest Service officer—but the tree-sitting concept was deemed sound by Earth First! members. Huber, Jakubal, and Roselle demonstrated the concept at the June 14 Washington EF Rendezvous; on June 23, a convoy of activists arrived at Willamette National Forest and set up tree platforms in "Squaw/Three timbersale", a location the group thought was threatened with imminent destruction. While at one point, up to a dozen trees were occupied, on July 10 a clash took down all the trees with platforms except for Ron Huber's after the other sitters had left for an overnight meeting elsewhere. Huber remained at his tree, dubbed Yggdrasil, until July 20 when two Linn County sheriff's deputies were lifted in a crane box and wrestled him from the tree.

=== Direct action ===
After 1987, Earth First became primarily associated with direct action to prevent logging, building of dams, and other forms of development which may cause severe destruction of wildlife habitats or the despoliation of wild places. The change in direction attracted many new members to Earth First, some of whom came from a leftist or anarchist political background or were involved in the counterculture. Dave Foreman has suggested that this led to the introduction of activities such as a "puke-in" at a shopping mall, a flag burning, the heckling of Edward Abbey at the 1987 Earth First rendezvous, and back-and-forth debates in the Earth First! Journal on topics such as anarchism, with which Foreman and other Earth First members did not wish to be associated. Most of the group's older members, including Dave Foreman, Howie Wolke, Bart Koehler, Christopher Manes, George Wuerthner, and Earth First! Journal editor John Davis, became increasingly uncomfortable with this new direction. This tension reportedly led several of the founders to sever their ties to Earth First in 1990. Many of them went on to launch the magazine, Wild Earth, as well as the environmental group, the Wildlands Project. On the other hand, Roselle, along with activists such as Judi Bari, welcomed the new direct-action tactics and leftist direction of Earth First.

Starting in the mid-1980s, Earth First increasingly promoted and identified with "deep ecology", a philosophy put forth by Arne Næss, Bill Devall, and George Sessions, which holds that all forms of life on Earth have equal value in and of themselves, without regard for their utility to human beings.

== From 1990–present ==
Since 1990, action within the Earth First movement has become increasingly influenced by anarchist political philosophy. This change brought a rotation of the primary media organ in differing regions,, an aversion to organized leadership or administrative structure, and a new trend of identifying Earth First as a mainstream movement rather than an organization. In 1992, Earth First's push toward the mainstream movement led to the creation of an offshoot group called Earth Liberation Front. The Earth Liberation Front was formally introduced during the 1992 "Earth First! Round River Rendezvous", where young activists debated the effectiveness of civil disobedience activism tactics in light of the ever-increasing destruction of the planet by human activity. Elders of the Earth First movement gave their blessing to this newly formed strike team known as ELF. ELF became the extremists of the environmental movement, just as the Earth First movement itself had been when it was created a decade earlier.

Earth First protests commonly involved occupations of forested timber sale areas and other threatened natural areas. In these protests, dozens of people physically locked their bodies to trees, bulldozers, and desks using specially created lock boxes (metal tubes reinforced with rebar) through which protesters threaded their arms, or using bicycle U-locks in order to lock their necks to other objects.

=== HeadWaters ===
The HeadWaters campaign in Northern California aimed to protect the last old-growth redwood forests, Headwaters Grove (now known as Headwaters Forest Reserve) 3,000 acres (1,200 ha) of forest from logging by the Pacific Lumber Company. Charles Hurwitz and his company Maxxam, Inc. purchased Pacific Lumber Company in 1985, and planned to liquidate its assets including these old-growth forests.

In May 1987, sawmill worker George Alexander lost several teeth and fractured his jaw when the saw he was operating struck an 11-inch spike and fragmented, sending shrapnel into his face. This incident, which occurred at the Cloverdale Louisiana-Pacific mill in northern California, is alleged to have been caused by tree-spiking by Earth First members, but no conclusive evidence has been found to prove this.

In 1997, as part of the ongoing HeadWaters Redwoods protests, activists locked themselves to a redwood stump which was carried into California Congressman Frank Riggs' office in Eureka. HeadWaters was an ongoing protest lasting over a decade, and ending in 2009.

The 1990s lawsuit, Headwaters Forest Defense vs. Humboldt County, charged that police officers were using excessive force, including chemical weapons.

The first acknowledged death of an Earth First activist occurred on September 18, 1998, in Northern California's Redwood forests. Earth First activist David Nathan "Gypsy" Chain attempted to protect the forest by trespassing inside an active logging site. During the logging operations, a large redwood was cut down by a Pacific Lumber logger and fell upon Chain, who died instantly.

=== Cove-Mallard Timber ===
Between 1992 and 1998 took place the largest timber sale in United States Forest Service history, the Cove-Mallard timber sale of 6,000 acres in Idaho near the Nez Perce National Forest. The group of EarthFirst activists focused on this area were called the "Cove-Mallard Coalition".

With the aid of a nearby landowner, a former land developer turned activist, Earth First occupied the forest. As a result, Earth First succeeded in saving most of the threatened wilderness area. Over 350 people from 12 countries were arrested and the project was reduced from its initial plan of 200 clear-cuts and the construction of seven new roads, to 37 clear-cuts and two new roads. In June 1993, Earth First halted the construction of the Noble Road by erecting elaborate multi-layered barricades, which included U.S. Forest Service vehicles. These barricades were constructed in one night, during which activists traveled 17 miles through the mountains dodging law enforcement patrols who had been informed of the planned demonstration. The first tripod lockdowns occurred at this incident, which involved three 30 foot logs, tied together and placed upright, with an activist tied to a platform between them 20 feet in the air. The tripod was placed over trenches in which four activists were buried in quick-drying cement. Two additional activists used U-locks to lock their necks to the front axles of responding vehicles. U.S. Forest Service shot at activists and raided the land with a SWAT team armed with M-16s. 27 activists were arrested.

William "Avalon" Rodgers, a member of the Earth Liberation Front, who alongside the rest of his ELF group was also arrested and were serving life sentences in federal prison for crimes that involved property damage. Rodgers was a long term Earth First activist, and one of the occupation activists of Free Cascadia/Warner Creek Oregon and the Cove/Mallard Idaho protests for years and one of four who constantly camped out in snow-caves monitoring the only logging of Noble Road in the winter of January to March 1995 in 12-foot deep snow and sub-zero temps.

=== Free Cascadia ===
During Free Cascadia, a mass occupation organized by Earth First at the Warner Creek timber sale 50 miles from Eugene, Oregon, 50-plus activists continuously occupied the burnt forested mountains of Oregon for nearly a year starting from September 1995 to August 1996. They endured bad weather like 6 feet of snow over the winter by constructing "Tarpees" - without animal skins - and law enforcement raids. Their barricades which were dug in reinforced trenches, forts with watchtowers, and tree-sits enabled a constant occupation of the "Cascadia Free State" while upwards of 1,000 arrests across the Pacific NW occurred at other ancient forests "timber sales" - nearly 200 arrests at the "Sugarloaf" timber sale alone - as well as other political actions across the nation including Washington D.C., ultimately stopping the Warner timber sale and half dozen timber sales in the Umpqua National Forest. Warner Creek is often seen an example of how the Earth First movement was successful, though most Earth First occupations of timber sales failed.

In the summer of 1995, environmental activists attempted to occupy the old-growth timber sale area of Sugarloaf Mountain in Southwest Oregon's Siskiyou Mountains inside the a 10,000+ acre Kangaroo roadless area which was contiguous with the Oregon Caves National Monument and Red Buttes Wilderness. The Sugarloaf Mountain had been in legal battles for over a decade prior when the "Rider from Hell" was added in committee to the congressional Crime Bill of 1994 and signed into effect by President Clinton on July 25, 1995 which mandated the logging of tens of thousands of acres of old-growth forest. The United States Forest Service declared an exclusionary zone of 30 square miles in southern Oregon and arrested anyone in the area, including a local woman walking her dog. Over 100 federal agents, supported by helicopters and the elite US Army Ranger-trained law enforcement squad known as "Camo-Feddies," arrested hundreds of activists. The environmental activists engaged at all levels of protest with numerous public and illegal demonstrations by Earth First, protests at government offices locally and in Washington D.C., tree-sits in active logging zones, and even an attempted helicopter pad lock-down to immobilize logging helicopters. One tree from Sugarloaf timber sale, which was a four day long tree-sit by a local father and son Earth First team, required 9 log trucks to carry it out in sections. This tree was estimated to be over 400 years old and took twenty-seven minutes to cut down using a 7-foot chainsaw.

Earth First responded by immediately occupying the logging road to the nearby timber sale known as China Left in early October 1995 to defend the old-growth forest and the last wild salmon spawning grounds in Oregon. EF activists used dragon lock-boxes on both ends of the valley's only road - known as the "Sucker Creek Free State" - to protect the area. An Earth First activist known as "Ocean" held the road for a day as police attempted to remove this human-and-cement blockade, allowing Earth First to dig in farther down the valley. This was the start of two-year-long occupation protest, during which a pickup truck was turned into a lock box to block the only bridge to the valley.

=== Judi Bari car bombing ===
In 1990, a bomb exploded in the car of Earth First activist Judi Bari, injuring Bari and fellow activist Darryl Cherney. Bari and Cherney were arrested due to suspicions by the police and Federal Bureau of Investigation that they had been transporting a bomb that had accidentally exploded. Bari contended that extremists opposed to her pro-environmental actions had placed the bomb in her car in order to kill her. The case against them was eventually dropped due to lack of evidence.

Bari died of cancer in 1997, but her federal lawsuit against the FBI and Oakland, California police resulted in a 2002 jury verdict awarding her estate and Darryl Cherney a total of $4.4 million.

A documentary movie about the court case, entitled The Forest for the Trees, was released in 2006. It was directed by Bernadine Mellis, whose father is one of the lawyers featured in the documentary. The documentary Who Bombed Judi Bari?, directed by Mary Liz Thomson, was released in 2012. The filmmakers are offering a $50,000 reward for information leading the arrest of the bomber.

On March 21, 2011, a U.S. federal judge in California ordered the FBI to preserve evidence related to the car bombing. The FBI was planning to destroy all evidence in the case. The bombing remains unsolved.

== Protest and ecodefense ==
Most activists of Earth First have previously participated in more moderate forms of environmental and political activism, including protest marches and writing letters to politicians. 'Fawn", an Earth Firster in the United States, grew up as a Republican, in a middle-class family. Most members of Earth First identify as decentralized, locally informed activists whose ideas stem from communitarian ethics. One of the early critics of Earth First's change in tactics later accused the FBI of deliberately introducing the concept of Non-Violence to the group.

In various parts of the United States, individual citizens and small groups form the base for grassroots political actions. These may take the form of legal actions, including protests, timber sale appeals, and educational campaigns or civil disobedience, including tree sitting, road blockades, and sabotage (also called "ecotage" by some Earth First members, who claim it is a form of ecodefense). Often, disruptive direct action is used primarily as a stalling tactic in an attempt to prevent possible environmental destruction while Earth First lawsuits try to secure long-term victories. Reported tactics include road blockades, activists locking themselves to heavy equipment, tree-sitting, and sabotage of machinery.

Earth First was known for providing information in the Earth First! Journal on the practice of tree-spiking and monkeywrenching (or ecotage), although there is no evidence that Earth First was involved in related activity. In 1990, Judi Bari convinced Earth First in the Northern California and Southern Oregon region to renounce the practice of tree-spiking, calling them counterproductive to an effort to form a coalition with workers and small logging businesses to defeat large-scale corporate logging in Northern California.

Police used non-lethal weapons and tactics against Earth First protesters including pepper spray, pain compliance holds, police dogs, and the threat of guns in attempts to coerce the protesters to abandon their lock downs.

== United Kingdom ==
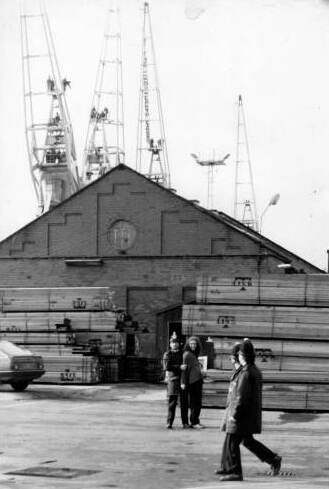
An arrest at the Liverpool docks (1992), with protestors occupying cranes in the background

The movement in the United Kingdom started in 1990, when a group in Hastings, Sussex organised an action at Dungeness nuclear power station in Kent. It grew rapidly, and many groups formed, with or without the EF name, over the next years.

The first major Earth First action happened in December 1991 at Port of Tilbury and focused around the importation of tropical hardwood. The second major action, the Merseyside Dock Action, attracted between 200–600 people who occupied Liverpool docks for two days. This action coincided with the Earth First roadshow, in which a group of UK & US Earth Firsters toured the country. Other early campaigns also focused on timber-yards, most notably the Timbmet yard in Oxford.

There are now various regional Earth First groups, the "EF! Action Update" has been joined by the "EF! Action Reports website" and a yearly Earth First national gathering. At the first gathering in Sussex the debate focused on the use of criminal damage as a protest technique. Earth First decided to neither 'condemn nor condone' criminal damage, instead it focused more on non-violent direct action techniques. Some people at the gathering coined the term Earth Liberation Front (ELF), which became a separate movement and spread back to the US. Actions involving criminal damage often happened under cover of night, typically done under an ELF banner and attributed to elves and pixies, or the Earth Liberation Faeries, giving a distinctly British feel to the movement.

Major growth in the direct action movement started with a concurrent focus on roads, and a protest camp at Twyford Down was started, against the M3 in Hampshire. Whilst Earth First groups still played an essential part, other groups such as the Dongas tribe soon formed. Alongside SchNEWS, such publications as the "Earth First! Action Update", and Do or Die were means of communication between the groups. The movement grew to other road protest camps including the Newbury bypass, the A30 and the M11 link road protest in London, where whole streets were squatted in order to slow down the construction work. Later the focus widened to other campaigns including Reclaim the Streets, anti-genetics campaigns, and Rising Tide. More recently, there have been groups such as Peat Alert! and Plane Stupid.

The UK Earth First groups differed considerably from the U.S. groups as reported in a ten-year retrospective of the Earth First by two of the founders Jake Bowers and Jason Torrance:

We knew EF US's original hardline 'rednecks for wilderness' attitude wouldn't appeal here, so we set out to build a group that combined radical action and social justice to protect Britain's few remaining natural places.

By viewing ecological and social justice as interconnected, in addition to organizing along anarchist lines, and incorporating other radical and militant struggles, EF combined audacious actions with systemic radicalism to spread its ideals to other countries and help morph the US movement.

== Sabotage ==
=== Fairfield Snowbowl Ski Resort ===
Earth First member Mark Davis was sentenced in Federal court to six years in prison for malicious destruction of property at the Fairfield Snowbowl Ski Resort near Flagstaff, Arizona, in concert with David Foreman, Ilse Asplund, Margaret Millett, and Mark Baker. Davis had been charged with "using a torch to cut around the base of the top pylon of the main chair lift at Snowbowl on October 25, 1988."

The resort attack, sabotage at Energy Fuels' Canyon uranium mine (6 miles southeast of Tusayan, Arizona), and attempting to cut down power-line towers leading to the Central Arizona Project aqueduct, were characterized as dress rehearsals for attacks on nuclear plants.

=== Telluride Ski Resort ===
On August 10, 1991, vandals identifying themselves as members of Earth First forced the closing of the Telluride Ski Resort in Mountain Village, Colorado using a chemical to write messages on 11 greens, such as "Earth First!", "Hayduke lives" and "Ron you pig". In relation to the incident, the Telluride Times Journal received a letter signed "Earth First" stating that the ski lift had been sabotaged with a welding gas applied to the lift cable that weakens the metal.

=== Aspen Pipeline Sabotage ===
A gas pipeline in Aspen Colorado was sabotaged turning off heat to 3,500 people on December 29, 2020. The perpetrators wrote "Earth First!" on the pipeline.

== Filmography ==
=== Documentary films ===
Year	Title	Notes
1999	Pickaxe, the Cascadia Free State Story	The film is based on the 1990s Earth First-led "Cascadia Free State"
2005	Testify! Eco-Defense and the Politics of Violence	
2009	Green With A Vengeance	EF, along with the ELF, were the subject of this documentary film.
2011	If a Tree Falls: A Story of the Earth Liberation Front	EF, along with the ELF, were the subject of this documentary film.

== See also ==
- Conservation ethic
- Environmental history of the United States#Ecocentrics
- Extinction Rebellion
- Green anarchism
- Green syndicalism
- Hayduke
- List of environmental organizations
