= Judi Bari =

American environmentalist, feminist, and labor leader (1949–1997)

- Judi Bari, March 3, 1995
- Born: Judith Beatrice Bari; November 7, 1949; Silver Spring, Maryland, U.S.
- Died: March 2, 1997 (aged 47); Near Willits, California, U.S.
- Education: University of Maryland
- Occupation: Earth First! organizer
- Known for: Environmental, labor and social justice leadership
- Spouse: Mike Sweeney
- Children: 2, Lisa and Jessica
- Parents: Arthur Bari (father); Ruth Aaronson Bari (mother)
- Relatives: Gina Kolata, Martha Bari (sisters)
- Website: www.judibari.org

Judith Beatrice Bari (November 7, 1949 – March 2, 1997) was an American environmentalist, feminist, and labor leader, primarily active in Northern California after moving to the state in the mid-1970s. In the 1980s and 1990s, she was the principal organizer of Earth First! campaigns against logging in the ancient redwood forests of Mendocino County and related areas. She also organized Industrial Workers of the World Local 1 in an effort to bring together timber workers and environmentalists of Earth First! in common cause.

Bari suffered severe injuries on 24 May 1990 in Oakland, California, when a pipe bomb went off under her seat in her car. She was driving with colleague Darryl Cherney, who had minor injuries. They were arrested by Oakland Police, aided by the FBI, who accused them of transporting a bomb for terrorist purposes. While those charges were dropped, in 1991 the pair filed suit against the Oakland Police Department and FBI for violations of their civil rights during the investigation of the bombing. A jury found in their favor when the case went to trial in 2002, and damages were awarded to Bari's estate and Cherney. Bari had died of cancer in 1997. The bombing has not been solved.

In 1999 a bill was passed to establish the Headwaters Forest Reserve (H.R. 2107, Title V. Sec.501.) under administration by the Bureau of Land Management. This protected 7,472 acres (30.24 km^{2}) of mixed old-growth and previously harvested forest. It was a project that Bari had long supported.

== Early life and education ==
Bari was born on November 7, 1949, and was raised in Silver Spring, Maryland, the daughter of mathematician Ruth Aaronson Bari, who became a recognized mathematician, and diamond setter Arthur Bari. Her parents were Jewish and Italian in ancestry, respectively. The elder Baris were both active in left-wing politics; they advocated for civil rights and opposed the Vietnam War. Judi Bari was the second of three daughters; her older sister is Gina Kolata, a science journalist for the New York Times; and younger is Martha Bari, an art historian.

Although Judi Bari attended the University of Maryland for five years, she dropped out without graduating. She said that her college career was most notable for "anti-Vietnam War rioting".

Bari began working as a clerk for a chain grocery store and became a union organizer in its work force. At her next job as a mail handler, she organized a wildcat strike in the United States Postal Service bulk mail facility in Maryland.

== Move to California, marriage and family ==
Bari moved to the Bay Area in Northern California, which was a center of political activism. In 1978 she met her future husband Michael Sweeney at a labor organizers' conference. They shared an interest in radical politics. Sweeney had graduated from Stanford University, and for a time in the early 1970s had been a member of the Maoist group Venceremos, which had mostly Chicano members. He had been married before.

In 1979, Bari and Sweeney married and settled in Santa Rosa, California. They had two daughters together, Lisa (1981) and Jessica (1985). The couple divorced in 1988 and shared custody of their children.

== Political and conservation activities ==
During the early to mid-1980s, Bari devoted herself to Pledge of Resistance, a group that opposed US policies in Central America. She was a self-proclaimed virtuoso on the bullhorn. She edited, wrote, and drew cartoons for political leaflets and publications.

Around 1985, Bari moved north with her husband and two children to the vicinity of Redwood Valley in Mendocino County, California. It was an area of old timber towns, such as Eureka and Fortuna, and a new wave of hippies and young counter-culture adults who migrated here from urban areas.

In 1986, Houston millionaire Charles Hurwitz acquired Pacific Lumber Company, with assets in Northern California, including in redwood forests. He doubled the company's rate of timber harvesting as a means of paying off the acquisition cost. This enraged environmentalists. The federal government also investigated the transaction because of Hurwitz's use of junk bonds. Activist protests against old-growth timber harvesting by Pacific Lumber became the focus of Earth First! in the following years.

On May 8, 1987, a sawmill accident occurred at the Louisiana Pacific mill in Cloverdale, California. Mill worker George Alexander nearly died of injuries suffered when a saw blade struck a spike in a log being milled, generating shrapnel. Adverse publicity resulted.

Earth First!, which at that point still promoted "monkeywrenching" as part of its tactics, was blamed by the company and some workers for the spike because of incidents of equipment sabotage that had taken place in the vicinity where the log was harvested. But responsibility for the spike was not determined. However, it was later confirmed that the prime suspect in the case was not an Earth First! activist but a local "disgruntled" landowner.

The bad publicity from the incident resulted in Earth First! disavowing tree spiking (but not other forms of sabotage).

In 1989, Bari was instrumental in starting Local 1 of the Industrial Workers of the World (IWW), which allied with Earth First! in protests against cutting old growth redwoods. Bari used her labor organizing background to run a workshop on the Industrial Workers of the World at an Earth First! rendezvous in California. Through the formation of IWW–EF! Local 1, she sought to bring together environmentalists and timber workers who were concerned about the harvest rate by the timber industry. She believed they had interests in common.

That year, Bari organized the first forest blockade, to promote expanding the South Fork Eel River Wilderness, managed by the US Bureau of Land Management. Related to her other interests, that year Bari also organized a counter-demonstration to protect a Planned Parenthood clinic in Ukiah.

Many timber workers believed that the environmentalists were threatening their livelihoods. At this time, environmentalists were backing their legal suits against timber overcutting by staging blockades of job sites in the woods and tree sitting. Loggers saw such actions as harassment. Confrontations between loggers and demonstrators were often heated and sometimes violent. Reactions to Bari's involvement in the protests were severe: her car was rammed by a logging truck in 1989, and she received death threats.

In August 1989, environmentalist Mem Hill suffered a broken nose in a protest confrontation with loggers in the woods. She filed a legal suit accusing a logger of assault, and claiming law enforcement did not protect her from attack.

Bari emphasized non-violent action and began to incorporate music into her demonstrations. She played the fiddle and sang original compositions by Darryl Cherney, who played guitar. Sometimes she sang her own songs. Their song titles and lyrics aroused controversy, as many listeners considered them offensive. Cherney's song about tree spiking, "Spike a Tree for Jesus" is one example; "Will This Fetus Be Aborted?", sung as a counter-protest to an anti-abortion rally, was another.

The media portrayed her as an obstructionist saboteur. Her tactics often rankled members of the timber industry and political establishment.

Differences emerged between Bari and her husband over their political paths and diverging lives. He headed a recycling company in the county. They struggled to reconcile political action with the obligations of parenting. In 1988, with a divorce between herself and her husband underway, she met Darryl Cherney. They began a romantic relationship based partly on shared political beliefs, and appeared together at various protests (as noted above).

In 1990, the Sierra Club withdrew its support from legislation amending California Forest Practice Rules and moved forward with a process to establish a Headwaters Forest preserve on Pacific Lumber Company land. They submitted a voter initiative, Proposition 130, dubbed "Forests Forever." The timber industry was strongly opposed to it. In response, environmentalists began organizing Redwood Summer, a campaign of nonviolent protests focused on slowing harvest of redwood forests in Northern California until such forests gained extra protections under Proposition 130. They named their campaign in honor of the 1964 Freedom Summer of the Civil Rights Movement. Bari was instrumental in recruiting demonstrators from college campuses across the United States. But on November 6, 1990, Proposition 130 was defeated by California voters, with 52.1% against. Opponents emphasized the disruptive activities of Redwood Summer, which interfered with timber workers, and the support of Earth First! for Proposition 130. It had been accused of sabotage and violence against workers in the past.

During organizing for Redwood Summer, Bari directed efforts in Mendocino County, and Cherney went on the road to recruit activists. Bari had local connections and a rapport with some lumber industry workers that was developed during her organizing efforts of an IWW local. While recruiting, Cherney was kept at a distance, so that his reputation for advocating sabotage and propensity for hostile outbursts toward timber workers could not damage the campaign.

On April 22, 1990, a group called Earth Night Action Group sabotaged power poles in southern Santa Cruz County, causing power outages. Upon hearing of that incident, Bari reportedly said, "Desperate times call for desperate measures," and "So what if some ice cream melted?" Observers interpreted her statements as approval of sabotage, and thought Earth First! might still be involved in such activities. A provocative flyer was publicized that had been written by Cherney: he called for "Earth Night" actions, and it featured images of a monkey wrench, an earth mover, and figures representing saboteurs in the night. Cherney said the flyer was facetious. The identities of members of the Earth Night Action Group has never been established; their relationship to Earth First! was a matter of speculation.

On May 9, 1990, a failed incendiary pipe bomb was discovered in the Louisiana Pacific sawmill in Cloverdale. A hand-lettered sign, saying "L-P screws millworkers", had been placed outside the mill. Responsibility for the bomb was never established.

On May 22, 1990, Bari met with local loggers to agree on ground rules for nonviolence during the Redwood Summer demonstrations. In the early afternoon of May 23, 1990, Bari started a road trip to Santa Cruz to organize for Redwood Summer and related musical events. She stopped for a press conference in Ukiah and for a meeting at the Seeds of Peace collective house in Berkeley.

That night she stayed overnight in Oakland, at a house near MacArthur and Park boulevards. On May 24 she and Darryl Cherney (as passenger) drove away from the house, and a short time later a bomb exploded beneath her seat. She suffered severe injuries and Cherney suffered lesser ones.

== Car bombing attempt on Bari's life ==
=== Summary ===
On May 24, 1990, in Oakland, California, Bari and Darryl Cherney were traveling in her car when it was blown up by a pipe bomb under her seat. Bari was driving and severely injured by the blast. Cherney suffered minor injuries. Bari was arrested for transporting explosives while she was still in critical condition with a fractured pelvis and other major injuries.

FBI bomb investigators reached the scene nearly simultaneously with first responders from the Oakland Police Department. Bari raised suspicion that the FBI knew about the bomb beforehand and might have been responsible for it. In Bari's words, it was as if the investigators were "waiting around the corner with their fingers in their ears." It was later revealed that there had been a tip to law enforcement, suspected to be from the person responsible for the bomb, that "some heavies" were carrying a bomb south for sabotage in the Santa Cruz area.

The Federal Bureau of Investigation (FBI) took jurisdiction of the case away from the Bureau of Alcohol, Tobacco, Firearms and Explosives, alleging it was an eco-terrorism case. The Oakland Police Department of Alameda County was the local agency on the case. Bari's wounds disabled her to the extent she had to curtail her activities. As Bari convalesced, other activists carried out Redwood Summer, conducting a series of demonstrations by thousands of environmental activists.

In late July 1990, the Alameda County District Attorney declined to press charges against Bari and Cherney, claiming insufficient evidence. But Bari and Cherney filed a civil rights suit in 1991 for violations by the FBI and Oakland Police because of the arrests and search warrants carried out on their properties. The trial was not concluded until 2002. Bari died of breast cancer in 1997. The jury found that their civil rights had been violated. The court made an award of $4.4 million to Cherney and Bari's estate.

=== Events of investigation ===
When the Oakland police and the FBI initially accused Bari and Cherney of knowingly carrying a bomb for use in an act of terrorism, the story made headlines nationwide. By 3:00 p.m. of the day of the bombing, Bari was arrested for transportation of illegal explosives. She was still being treated in Highland Hospital.

Because of Earth First! had earlier developed a reputation for sabotage, the media reported the police version of events. For example, a KQED news report, entitled "Focus: Logjam", used the term "radical" to describe Earth First!, blamed them for having sabotaged loggers' equipment and conducting tree spiking, and tied Bari's bombing in with such actions.

Based on his personal observations of bomb damage to the car, FBI Special Agent Frank Doyle filed a public affidavit that the bomb had been carried on the back seat floorboard of Bari's vehicle. The FBI was granted a search warrant on May 25 at 2:21 a.m., and agents used a helicopter to quickly reach Bari's home and search it. Agents also searched the premises of the "Seeds of Peace" house in Berkeley, where Bari and Cherney had visited the day before the explosion. Members of Seeds of Peace were repeatedly interviewed; they said that they repeatedly told police that Bari and Cherney were committed to nonviolence.

Within a week, supporters of Bari and Cherney were petitioning for an investigation of the FBI's investigative methods. Daniel Hamburg, a former Mendocino County Supervisor, and others complained that the investigation seemed focused on charging the two environmentalists.

On July 6, a new search warrant for Bari's home was granted, as investigators sought exemplars of typewriting to compare to the typewritten The "Lord's Avenger", a letter claiming responsibility for the bomb.

FBI analysis of the explosive device determined it was a pipe bomb with nails wrapped to its surface to create shrapnel. It was equipped with a timer-armed motion trigger, so that it would explode only when the car was driven. The bomb was confirmed to have been placed on the floorboard directly under the driver's seat, not on the floorboard behind the seat, as Agent Doyle had claimed. That evidence suggested that the bomb was an anti-personnel device intended to kill the driver of Bari's car. The FBI investigation remained focused on the theory that the explosion was an accidental detonation of a device knowingly transported by Bari. They attempted to match roofing nails transported in Bari's car to finishing nails used with the bomb. After seven weeks of news stories reporting the police claims that all evidence pointed to Bari and Cherney, the Alameda County District Attorney announced that he would not file any formal charges against the pair due to insufficient evidence against them. Law enforcement agencies never fully investigated evidence that the bombing was an attempt on Bari's life. The crime has remained unsolved.

During her convalescence, Bari issued a directive prohibiting those in her circle from cooperating with investigators. Even after she was no longer considered a suspect, she demanded that her circle remain silent. Bari offered cooperation with investigators in return for legal immunity; but her offer was refused.

=== Theories ===
==== The "Lord's Avenger" ====
Five days after the bombing, on May 29, while Bari was still in hospital, Mike Geniella of the Santa Rosa Press Democrat received a letter claiming responsibility for both the bomb in Bari's car and a partially detonated one set a week before at the Cloverdale lumber mill. Written in an ornate, biblical style with misogynistic language, the letter was signed "The Lord's Avenger." It said the writer had been outraged by Bari's statements and behavior in December 1988, when she opposed an anti-abortion protest at a Planned Parenthood clinic in Ukiah, California. The letter described the construction of the two bombs in great detail.

Based on content of the letter, law enforcement investigated Bill Staley, a self-styled preacher, Louisiana Pacific mill worker, and former professional football player who had been prominent at the 1988 anti-abortion demonstration. Staley was eventually cleared of suspicion in the bombing. While the letter's author gave accurate details about the bombs' construction, investigators found the explanation of how the bomb was placed in Bari's car to be implausible. Both supporters and detractors of Bari's theory of the bombing being an FBI/industry plot, which had been publicized, concluded that the bomb builder sent the letter in an effort to divert attention to Staley.

==== Darryl Cherney ====
Investigators looked closely at both Cherney and Bari's ex-husband Sweeney as potential suspects, knowing that women often faced danger and were killed by men close to them, especially after relationships ended. Some of Bari's friends had noted changes in her relationship with Cherney, and thought he may have set the bomb because Bari had replaced him as the leading organizer of Earth First! in northern California. In a related rumor, there was talk that killing Bari would provide a martyr to boost the profile of Redwood Summer. Suspicions about his writing the Lord's Avenger letter, as well as more general grounds, fell apart under logical impossibilities.

==== FBI ====
The FBI's assertion that the bombing was an accidental detonation was shown to be completely implausible in the face of physical evidence. Bari and her supporters began to suspect the assailant was associated with the FBI. Within the next year, Bari developed the theory that the bomber was an acquaintance whom she had suspected of being an FBI informant. From depositions taken in 1994 for Bari and Cherney's federal civil rights lawsuit, they learned that the May 24 bombing of Bari's car bore a close resemblance to "crime scenes" staged by the FBI in a "bomb school" held in redwood country with the assistance of the Pacific Lumber company earlier that year. Bari and followers believed this supported their idea that the bombing could be attributed to the FBI.

The FBI school was intended to train local and state police officers on how to investigate bomb scenes. The school taught that bomb explosions inside a vehicle often indicated the knowing, criminal transportation of homemade bombs, which went off accidentally. They noted that it was difficult to break into a locked car in order to plant a bomb. By 1991, evidence conclusively showed that the bomb was placed directly beneath Bari's seat, as she had said from the day of the accident.

According to Bari, FBI Special Agent Frank Doyle, one of the agents on her case, had been the instructor at the bomb school. At least four of the law enforcement responders to the bombing had been students of his at the school.

In the weeks before the bombing, Bari had received numerous death threats related to her anti-logging activism, which she reported to local police. After the bombing, her attorney turned over such written threats to the FBI for investigation. As revealed in the 2002 trial evidence, neither the Oakland police nor the FBI ever investigated these.

==== Bari's ex-husband ====
In 1991, Stephen Talbot, KQED reporter and documentary producer, and investigative reporter David Helvarg made a documentary titled Who Bombed Judi Bari?. It was the first mainstream media investigation to critique the FBI and Oakland Police Department case against Bari. During the production, Talbot discovered circumstantial evidence and heard suspicions expressed by acquaintances of Bari that her ex-husband Mike Sweeney should be considered a suspect. Bari told Talbot in confidence that she also had doubts about her former husband, and that he abused her during their marriage. She later publicly denied these statements. Talbot named Sweeney and others as possible suspects in the bombing, but in 1991 did not attribute any statements to Bari. After her death, he felt released from his journalist's protection of her as a source. He wrote about Sweeney as a suspect more directly in a 2002 article published on Salon.com.

Even though Talbot and Helvarg's film had made the case for Bari's innocence, based on their point-by-point critique of the FBI and Oakland police accusations against her, Bari strongly criticized Talbot's 1991 film in her article, "Who bought Steve Talbot?," published in the San Francisco Weekly and the Anderson Valley Advertiser because Talbot raised questions about her ex-husband Michael Sweeney.

Talbot also had reported a 1989 letter signed by "Argus" that was sent to the Chief of the Ukiah Police Department, offering to be an informant against Bari regarding marijuana dealing. Bari claimed in her article that the "Argus" letter had to have been written by Irv Sutley, a Peace and Freedom Party activist whom she had met in 1988. Attention had also been focused on two other threatening letters: a "no second warning" death threat letter sent to Bari about a month before the bombing, and what became known as the "Lord's Avenger" letter sent to the Santa Rosa Press Democrat immediately after the bombing.

Through the early 1990s, many activists believed that the bombing was the work of either the FBI or other opponents of Bari's Earth First! activities. Irv Sutley was suspected as the hitman. But Bari's attempts to shape accounts of the bombing were alienating supporters and raised suspicions that she was hiding something. Bruce Anderson of the Advertiser was among those put off by her assertions. He knew that the 1988 divorce had been bitter. While he thought that some of her post-bombing behavior was odd, he continued to support her public position.

As he later recalled:

I still feel guilty about not defending you [Talbot]. I wimped out completely. I knew she'd told you about Sweeney. Lots of people knew she'd told you. I was a complete dupe, a coward and a fool. I convinced myself that her work mobilizing people against the corporate timber companies outweighed unpleasant aspects of her character and the even more unpleasant aspects of her personal behavior.

In a reaction to efforts to tie Sutley to the bombing, some former Bari supporters publicly shifted their suspicion toward Sweeney. In 1995 Ed Gehrman, a teacher and publisher of Flatland, a small magazine (now defunct) in Fort Bragg, California, had also participated in Redwood Summer protests. He became concerned about the controversy over Sutley. Initially suspecting Sutley, Gehrman questioned him directly about it. Sutley denied being involved. In addition, he said that in 1989, Pam Davis, a friend of Bari, had on three separate occasions offered him $5,000 to kill her ex-husband Sweeney. In response, Bari said in a radio broadcast that the apparent solicitation was a joke misunderstood by her friend, who had conveyed the offer to Sutley.

Gehrman believed that someone was lying. He discussed the issues with journalist Alexander Cockburn of CounterPunch, a political magazine. Cockburn offered to pay for polygraph tests of the key players in the controversy. Sutley was the only one who accepted the offer; he took a polygraph test and passed. (Law enforcement does not rely on such polygraph tests.) After that, Gehrman considered Sutley credible. As he considered motives for that attack, he began to suspect Sweeney more strongly.

Gehrman presented his case for exculpating Sutley in Flatland. Anderson reconsidered his support of Bari's position, arousing anger among her supporters. Anderson was incensed by the possibility that Bari had tried to smear an innocent man in order to promote her narrative that the timber industry and/or the FBI were involved in the bombing. Anderson suggested that Bari and Sweeney each had sufficient guilty knowledge to destroy the other – a legal mutual assured destruction scenario.

Meanwhile, Gehrman tried to use the "Argus," "no second warning," and "Lord's Avenger" letters to determine the identity of Bari's assailant. He submitted facsimiles of the three letters and their envelopes, along with exemplars of text written by various suspects, to Don Foster. An English professor at Vassar College, Foster had established expertise in attributional analysis of documents. (He has since been discounted as an expert.) Foster concluded that the three letters were from the same writer and most closely matched exemplars by Sweeney.

Anderson wrote regular columns in the Advertiser accusing the supporters of the late Bari of lying by their continued support of the industry/FBI theory. Gehrman said he was approached in 2005 by Jan Maxwell, a longtime friend of Pam Davis. Maxwell said that Davis had told her that Bari had suggested a murder-for-hire solicitation against Sweeney. This seemed to place the solicitations to Sutley within a larger pattern. Gehrman presented a summary of his knowledge about the case, which he reprinted in the Advertiser in 2008.

Years before, in 2002, at the conclusion of the Bari/Cherney civil rights trial, Stephen Talbot had already publicly reported on Salon.com that Bari had confided in him about her suspicions of Sweeney and the car bombing, as well as her knowledge that he had firebombed the Santa Rosa airport in 1980. She also said that Sweeney had abused her during their marriage.

=== Aftermath ===
While the bombing investigation was underway, Earth First! organizers proceeded with training and demonstrations in several timber towns: Fort Bragg (July), Eureka, and Fortuna. Before they got underway, the Mendocino County Board of Supervisors was considering legislation to regulate the size of protest signs and standards, in order to curb violence by demonstrators. Meanwhile, Redwood Summer organizers debated whether to cancel demonstrations in the woods as being too dangerous.

On May 29, representatives of Redwood Summer were pleased to reach an agreement with some of industry: they signed with small local logging companies to support nonviolent and non-destructive protests of timber harvesting. Activists eventually continued events of Redwood Summer, demonstrating in some of the timber towns. The demonstrations by environmentalists were generally countered by demonstrations of numerous loggers and their families. The latter believed that their jobs and lives were jeopardized by proposed restrictions on logging.

Redwood Summer ended with Earth First! claiming success because they had trained so many volunteers in nonviolent resistance. But the numbers of participants in protests were smaller than organizers had hoped for. In addition, by September, the New York Times was reporting that antagonism between environmentalists and timber workers seemed to have increased. State voters defeated Proposition 130, which would have restricted logging, on November 6, 1990. The campaign against it had emphasized its support by Earth First!.

Several years later, the Northern California "Timber Wars" heated up again in 1998. Earth First! members were dissatisfied with the final agreement that established the Headwaters Forest Reserve. By a bill passed in 1997, the government was authorized to acquire and protect 7,472 acres (30.24 km^{2}), rather than the much larger portion proposed for more than a decade. The division between the timber community and Earth First! became sharper than ever. "Anarchists" and other advocates of violence, such as Rodney Coronado, a convicted arsonist and Earth Liberation Front member, gained prominence within Earth First!. Such members threatened both the industrial equipment and facilities of timber companies, as well as individuals at their private residences. After Bari died in 1997, she had the status of a major leader in Earth First! lore, but timber protests moved away from the community-based collaboration that she had tried to develop and present.

=== Later events related to bombing investigation ===
The bombing of Bari and Cherney has never been solved. Following the 2002 trial and award of damages, Cherney and supporters sought access to the remains of the partially intact Cloverdale mill bomb held by the FBI. Investigators believed that similarities between it and the remains of the pipe bomb in the car showed they were constructed by the same maker. They hoped to find DNA evidence that could be analyzed by current technology and reveal a suspect. In 2012, a federal judge ordered the FBI not to destroy the remains of that pipe bomb, as they had planned. Ben Rosenfeld, attorney for Cherney, requested DNA analysis by an outside lab. The FBI said they had never performed such testing. The judge ordered such testing.

The case remains under the jurisdiction of the City of Oakland, where it occurred, and the Alameda County District Attorney. The Mendocino County Sheriff's Office has deferred on jurisdictional issues, claiming that there is insufficient evidence that the bomb was planted in Mendocino County.

In 2001 DNA evidence from documents, including the "Lord's Avenger" letter, which is believed strongly tied to Bari's assailant and yielded a fingerprint, was presented by joint agreement of the Bari advocates and the FBI. It does not match DNA samples obtained from Sutley. Mike Sweeney reportedly had not submitted a DNA sample. It is not known if law enforcement requested him to submit one.

== Writing and public service career ==
Bari became a political writer as part of her interests in feminism, class struggle, and ecology. In May 1992, in an article published in Ms. magazine, she claimed to have feminized Earth First!. The radical environmentalist group was founded by men. In its early days, they pursued sabotage that damaged equipment and threatened the lives of timber workers, a series of actions known as "monkeywrenching". Bari emphasized non-violent actions and public education in an effort to build collaboration in the region.

Stepping back from Earth First! leadership because of dealing with inoperable cancer, by the end of 1996, Bari was working as a para-legal and hosting a weekly public radio show. Before her death, she organized the Redwood Summer Justice Project, a non-profit organization to coordinate political and financial support for the suit she and Cherney were conducting.

In 1994 Bari was part of a congressional advisory committee, chartered by Congressman Dan Hamburg (D-CA), trying to develop a proposal for a Headwaters Forest Reserve of 44,000 acres. Efforts had been underway to protect this area for more than a decade. Their proposal included a compensation clause for those lumber workers who would have been laid off following establishment of this extensive reserve. The bill based on the "large reserve" proposal died in Congress after Hamburg lost his 1994 re-election bid; during a midterm upheaval, he was defeated by the Republican former incumbent of his seat. Instead, a 7472-acre forest reserve was authorized by a bill passed on November 14, 1997, shortly after Bari's death.

== Death and posthumous civil rights trial ==
On March 2, 1997, Bari died of breast cancer at her home near Willits. A memorial service in her honor was attended by an estimated 1,000 people.

Bari and Cherney had filed a federal civil rights suit in 1991 claiming that the FBI and police officers falsely arrested the pair in relation to the bombing of her car in May 1990. They were accused of carrying the bomb to use for other purposes. Bari and Cherney said that law enforcement was trying to frame them as terrorists so as to discredit their political organizing to protect the redwood forests.

In 1997, Bari and Cherney sued the law enforcement officers named in the civil rights suit for conspiracy to violate the activists' First and Fourth Amendment rights. On October 15 that year, the agents lost their bid for immunity from prosecution.

Also on October 15, federal judge Claudia Wilken dismissed former FBI supervisor SAIC Richard Wallace Held from the case. The court said that as SAIC he had no duty to oversee the daily duties of his subordinate agents. The plaintiffs' contention that the FBI was responsible for the bomb was also dismissed from the case. Its scope was restricted to malicious investigative malpractice on the part of the FBI, and the allowed damage claim was reduced from $20 million to $4.4 million.

The suit finally went to trial in 2002. After deliberation for two weeks, a jury found in favor of Bari's and Cherney's federal civil lawsuit. They concluded the pair's civil rights had been violated by several named individuals from the FBI and Oakland Police Department.

As part of the jury's verdict, the judge ordered Frank Doyle and two other FBI agents, and three Oakland police officers, to pay a total of $4.4 million to Cherney and to Bari's estate. The award was compensation for the defendants' violation of the plaintiffs' First Amendment rights to freedom of speech and freedom of assembly, and for the defendants' various unlawful acts, including unlawful search and seizure in violation of the plaintiffs' Fourth Amendment rights. At trial the FBI and the Oakland Police had pointed fingers at each other:

Oakland investigators testified that they relied almost exclusively on the F.B.I.'s counter-terrorism unit in San Francisco for advice on how to handle the case. But the F.B.I. agents denied misleading the investigators into believing that Ms. Bari and Mr. Cherney were violence-prone radicals who were probably guilty of transporting the bomb.

While neither agency would admit wrongdoing, the jury held both liable, finding that "[B]oth agencies admitted they had amassed intelligence on the couple before the bombing." This evidence supported the jury's finding that both the FBI and the Oakland police persecuted Bari and Cherney as potential terrorists rather than conducting a full investigation to try to find the perpetrators. They were trying to discredit and sabotage Earth First! and the planned Redwood Summer of 1990, thereby violating the plaintiffs' First Amendment rights and justifying the large award.

After the trial's gag order was lifted, a juror revealed to the press that she believed the law enforcement agents had lied:

"Investigators were lying so much it was insulting . ... I'm surprised that they seriously expected anyone would believe them ... They were evasive. They were arrogant. They were defensive," said juror Mary Nunn.

== Legacy ==
On May 20, 2003, the Oakland City Council unanimously voted a resolution establishing Judi Bari Day, stating:

Whereas, Judi Bari was a dedicated activist, who worked for many social and environmental causes, the most prominent being the protection and stewardship of California's ancient redwood forests. ... Now, therefore, be it resolved that the City of Oakland shall designate May 24 as Judi Bari Day ...

== Bibliography ==
=== Books by Bari ===
- Bari, Judi (May 1992). "The Feminization of Earth First!". History Is A Weapon.
- Bari, Judi (1994). Timber Wars. Common Courage Press. ISBN 1567510264.
- Bari, Judi (June 1997). "Revolutionary ecology". Capitalism Nature Socialism. 8 (2): 145–149. doi:10.1080/10455759709358742.
- Bari, Judi (1998). Revolutionary Ecology: Biocentrism & Deep Ecology. Doug Thron (Illustrator). Trees Foundation.

=== Books and articles about Bari ===
- Coleman, Kate (2005). The Secret Wars of Judi Bari: A Car Bomb, the Fight for the Redwoods and the End of Earth First!. Encounter Books. ISBN 978-1893554740.
- Ongerth, Steve (2010). Redwood Uprising: From One Big Union to Earth First! and the Bombing of Judi Bari., self-published on his website set up for the book
- Shantz, Jeffrey (2002). "Judi Bari and 'The Feminization of Earth First!': The Convergence of Class, Gender and Radical Environmentalism". Feminist Review. 70 (70): 105–122. doi:10.1057/palgrave/fr/9400003. JSTOR 1395973.
- The Encyclopedia of American Law Enforcement: Facts on File Crime Library. Michael Newton. Infobase Publishing, 2007. ISBN 978-0816062904.
- The Last Stand: The War Between Wall Street and Main Street Over California's Ancient Redwoods . David Harris . University of California Press, 1997. ISBN 978-0871569448 .
- The Symbolic Earth: Discourse and Our Creation of the Environment Environmental Studies . Editors: James Gerard Cantrill, Christine Lena. University Press of Kentucky, 1996. ISBN 978-0813108834 .
- Stories of Globalization: Transnational Corporations, Resistance, and the State . Alessandro Bonanno, Douglas H. Constance. Penn State Press, 2010. ISBN 978-0271033891 .
- The War Against the Greens: The "Wise-Use" Movement, the New Right, and the Browning of America. David Helvarg. Big Earth Publishing, 2004. ISBN 978-1555663285 .

== Renewed controversy ==
A critical biography of Bari titled The Secret Wars of Judi Bari (2005), by investigative journalist Kate Coleman, drew fierce criticism by many supporters. But a review by Polly Welts Kaufman in Environmental History said that the author "succeeds in offering a balanced view of her life."

Cherney, managers of Bari's estate (for her portion of the FBI settlement award), Bari's ex-husband Michael Sweeney, a suspect in the bombing; and their followers, claimed the book had hundreds of factual errors and expressed a bias against Bari and Earth First! These critics noted that the publisher, Encounter Books, was founded by arch-conservative Peter Collier. They said it was funded primarily by arch-conservative foundations not sympathetic to Bari's causes. Author Coleman said that such allegations and the aspersions cast on the publisher, were being used as a smokescreen. She said the book's detractors were dedicated to preserving an incomplete and distorted memory of Ms. Bari.

Cherney and some other critics said that Coleman had failed to include more information from their points of view. The author said that they had not responded to her attempts to contact them.

In her book, Coleman outlined a case that Sweeney, Bari's ex-husband, had planted the bomb in order to kill her. This thesis had been suggested by others, namely Stephen Talbot, in his 1991 documentary, and more specifically in his 2002 article on Salon.com, in which he revealed statements that Bari had made to him in 1991. He felt her death lifted his responsibility to protect her confidences.

Mark Hertsgaard wrote a critical review in the Los Angeles Times entitled, "'Too many rumors, too few facts to examine eco-activism case". He said, "the reporting is thin and sloppy, and the humdrum prose is marred by dubious speculation." Ed Guthmann, in a review in the San Francisco Chronicle, criticized Hertsgaard's review for containing its own errors.

== Films ==
Year	Tile	Type	Notes
1991	Who Bombed Judi Bari?	Television documentary, 60 min	Made for KQED television in San Francisco by Stephen Talbot. He uncovered new evidence about the events, and featured interviews with many of the players in the case. His investigation critiqued the FBI and Oakland Police Department handling of the case.
2006	The Forest for the Trees: Judi Bari vs the FBI	Documentary film, 57 min	This documentary was directed by Bernadine Mellis, about the case and 2002 civil rights trial. Mellis is the daughter of lead attorney for Bari, Dennis Cunningham. The film aired on PBS and the Sundance Channel. It received the Grand Prize at the Green Film Festival in Seoul. It was edited by Susan Korda in a reworking in 2005.
2012	Who Bombed Judi Bari?	Documentary film, 95 min	A second documentary called Who Bombed Judi Bari?, was produced by Darryl Cherney and directed by Mary Liz Thomson. Created from existing video materials, such as Bari's deposition for her court case, and news sources about various protest actions, the film is effectively narrated by Bari. She suggests that the FBI and/or the timber industry were responsible for the bombing.(subscription required)
