= Alton, California =

Unincorporated community in California, United States

Alton
- Unincorporated community
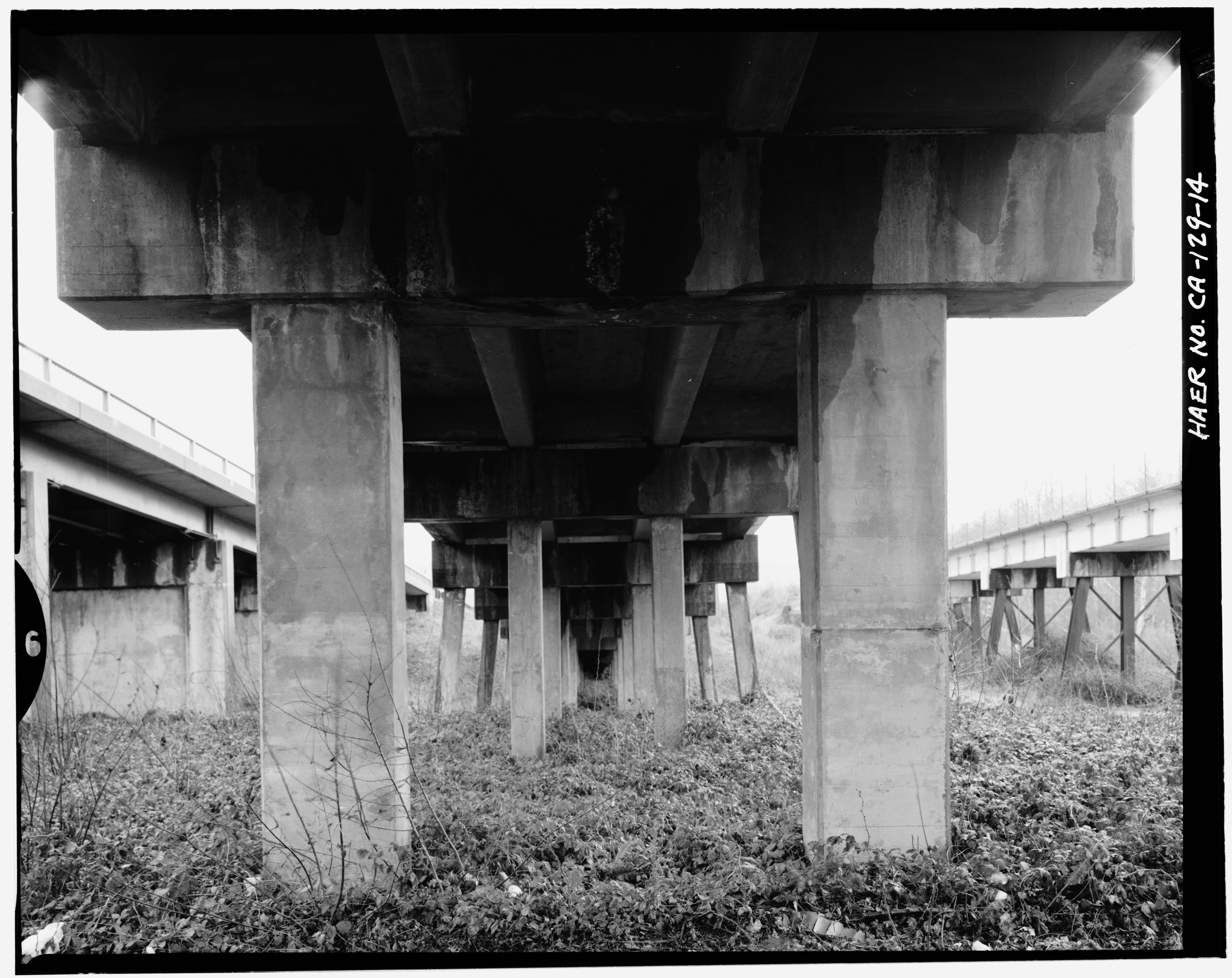
- The underside of Highway 101's Van Duzen River Bridge in Alton

- Location in California
- Coordinates: 40°32′50″N 124°08′27″W
- Country: United States
- State: California
- County: Humboldt
- Elevation: 62 ft (19 m)

Alton (formerly, Hansen) is an unincorporated community in Humboldt County, California, United States. It is located 3.5 miles (5.6 km) south-southeast of Fortuna, at an elevation of 62 feet (19 m). Alton is located along U.S. Route 101 and State Route 36. The ZIP Code is 95540. The community is served by area code 707.

== History ==
The name Hansen honors Mads P. Hansen, its first postmaster. The Hansen post office opened in 1888, changed its name to Alton in 1889, and closed for good in 1895. The origin of the name Alton is disputed. Some say Alton was a corruption of its founder's name, Alta Oliver. Another source indicates the community was named in 1862 for the founder's hometown of Alton, Illinois.

The Eel River and Eureka Railroad was built in 1884 to provide Humboldt Bay shipping access to lumber mills and farms of the lower Eel River. In 1885, Pacific Lumber Company built a rail connection from their Scotia lumber mill to the Eel River and Eureka Railroad at Alton. Alta Oliver laid out the town at the junction of the two railroads in 1887. The California Midland Railroad was formed in 1902 to extend rail service from Alton up the Van Duzen River to Carlotta. Atchison, Topeka and Santa Fe Railway merged Alton's railroads into the San Francisco and Northwestern Railway in 1903; and Alton was linked to the national rail network by completion of the Northwestern Pacific Railroad in 1914.

Between 1969 and 1989, Frank Bayliss operated his narrow gauge Alton & Pacific Railroad near the town.

== Politics ==
In the state legislature, Alton is in the 2nd senatorial district, represented by Democrat Mike McGuire, and the 2nd Assembly district, represented by Democrat Chris Rogers.

Federally, Alton is in California's 2nd congressional district, represented by Democrat Jared Huffman.

== See also ==
- Northwestern Pacific Railroad
