= Fortuna, California =

City in California, United States

- City
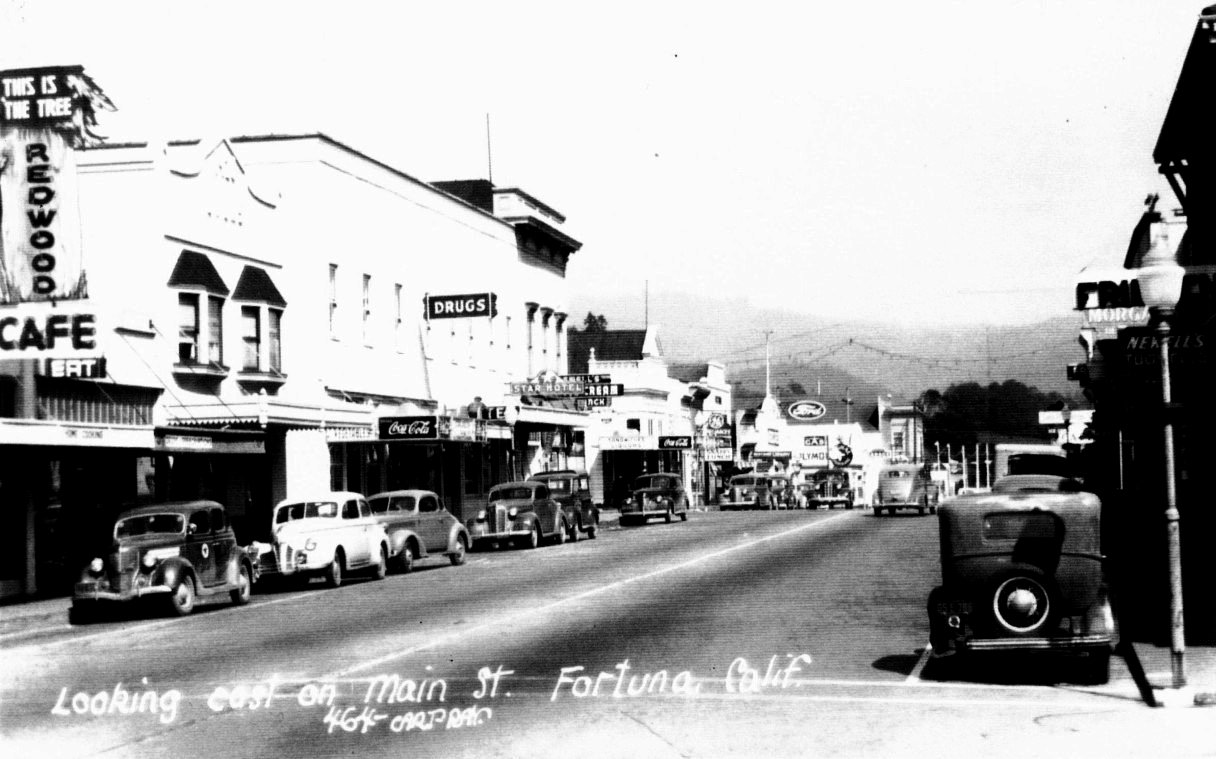
- Main Street in Fortuna in the 1940s

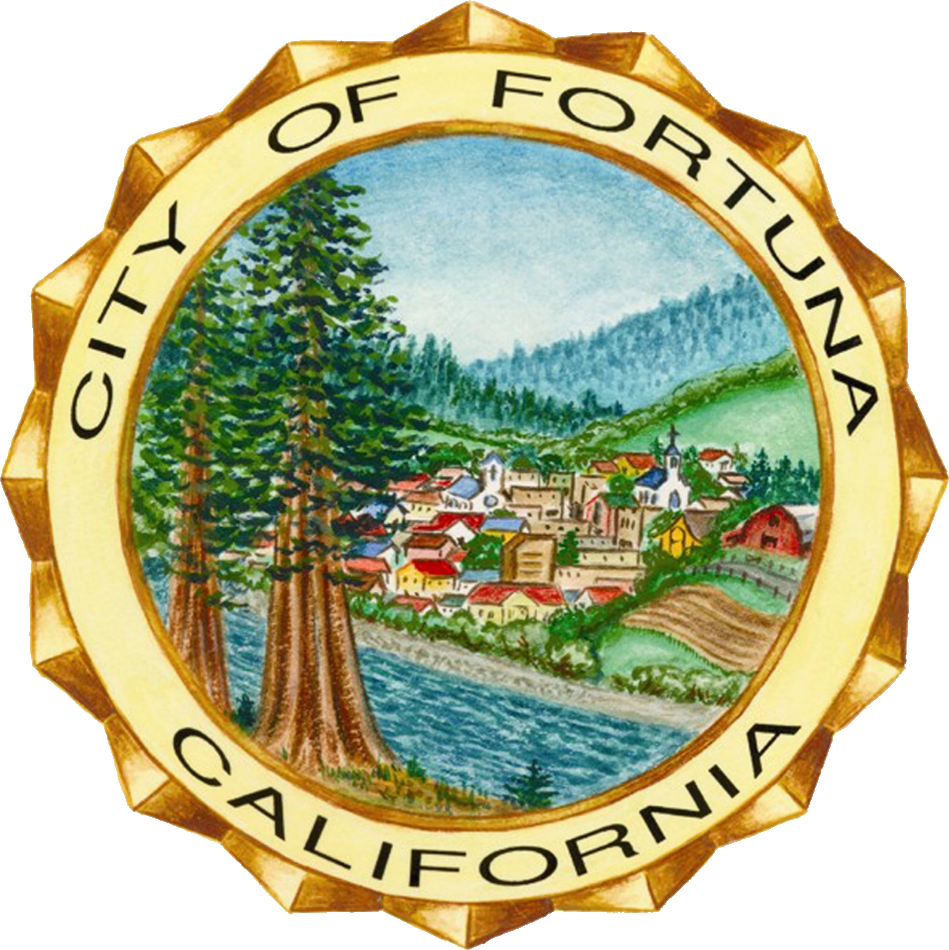
- Seal
- Nickname: The Friendly City
- Interactive map of Fortuna, California
- Location in the United States
- Coordinates: 40°35′53″N 124°09′26″W
- Country: United States
- State: California
- County: Humboldt
- Incorporated: January 20, 1906

Government
  - Type: Council/Manager
  - Mayor: Mike Johnson

Area
  - Total: 5.25 sq mi (13.60 km^{2})
  - Land: 5.25 sq mi (13.59 km^{2})
  - Water: 0 sq mi (0.00 km^{2}) 0%
- Elevation: 66 ft (20 m)

Population (2020)
  - Total: 12,516
  - Density: 2,385.3/sq mi (920.97/km^{2})
- Time zone: UTC-8 (Pacific (PST))
  - Summer (DST): UTC-7 (PDT)
- ZIP code: 95540
- Area code(s): 707, 369
- FIPS code: 06-25296
- GNIS feature IDs: 277520, 2410532
- Website: friendlyfortuna.com

Fortuna (Spanish for "Fortune"; Wiyot: Vutsuwitk Da'l) is a city on the northeastern bank of the Eel River, approximately 9 miles (14 km) from where it enters the Pacific Ocean, and is on U.S. Route 101 in west-central Humboldt County, California, United States. The population was 12,516 at the 2020 census, up from 11,926 at the 2010 census.

== History ==
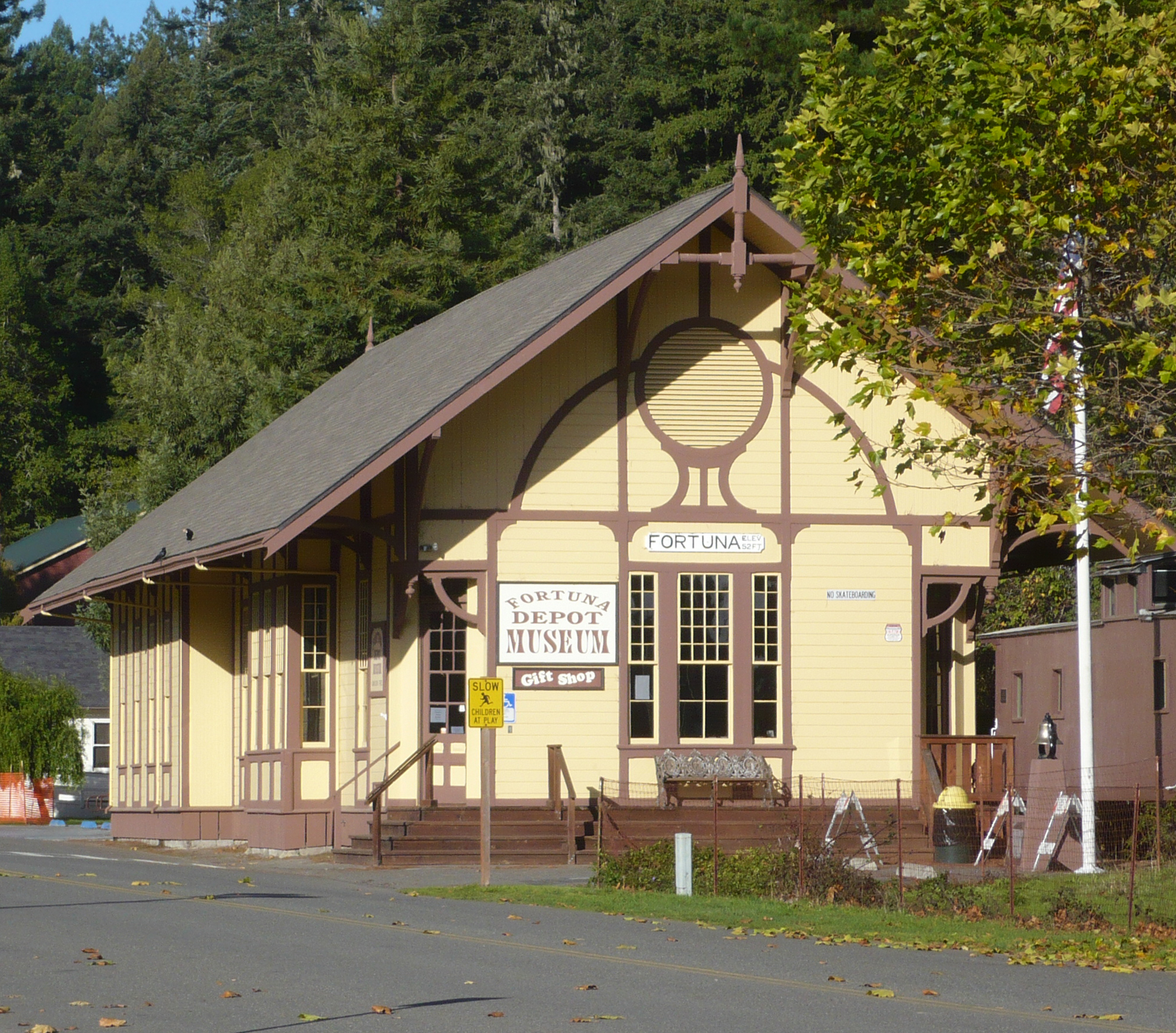
The former Northwestern Pacific Railroad depot, now a museum

The settlement was originally called "Slide," for Slide Hill, in 1874, named for the slide that was a fixture on the northeast side of the Eel River and the southwest portion of Christian Ridge just to the northwest, near the edge of town. In 1875, the name was changed to Springville during the construction of the Springville Mill, a lumber mill for the nearby redwood forests, named so because of the numerous springs in the area. The mill's owners were Henry Rohner (namesake of neighboring Rohnerville), Alexander Masson, M. N. Weber and G. F. Gushaw. Springville was originally a company town belonging to the mill, and the few people that resided there all worked at the mill. By the late 1870s Springville had grown enough to warrant a post office, but a town called Springville, California (now part of Camarillo, in Ventura County) already existed in the state. The post office was named Slide on May 24, 1876. In 1884 the residents petitioned the state legislature for the name Fortuna, Spanish for "fortune" and Latin for "chance," and by July 3, 1888, the change was official. The name was chosen when settlers saw the proximity of the forests, the river and its valley, and the Pacific Ocean, as ideal for enjoying a good quality of life, and felt "fortunate" to live there. It is believed that a local minister and real estate agent, desiring to sell lots to newcomers, devised the name as a marketing tool. Alternatively, an Odd Fellows men's club was known as the Fortuna Lodge, No. 221. Jack Hosier, a member, suggested the name of Fortuna for the town.

Electricity came to Fortuna in 1883 when W. J. Swortzel and George W. Williams (of Swortzel & Williams), owners of the Springville Mill Company, built a $4,000 power plant. Some of the local sawmills were already powered by electricity, and by providing power to the mills, Swortzel and Williams saw the opportunity to also provide inexpensive electric lighting to the townspeople.

The town was incorporated on February 20, 1906, and, because of the Eel River, became known for its agricultural prowess in vegetable crops, berries and fruits, and for the fresh fish from the river. Although agricultural industry was expanding, the lumber industry is what started the town, and would continue as the main source of local income for some time to come.

Rohnerville (formerly Eel River Township), a town founded to service the many gold miners inhabiting the mountains to the north and east, was competing with Fortuna to be the leading township in the area. The miners would come by ship to Eureka, and then head up the Eel River to the junction with the Van Duzen River, from whence the miners headed east up the Van Duzen River Valley into Trinity County. Rohnerville was at this junction, and looked to prosper from selling supplies to the miners. But when it was decided that the railroad would be routed through neighboring Fortuna, it set the fate of both towns.

The Eel River and Eureka Railroad was built in 1884 to provide Humboldt Bay shipping access to the lumber mills and farms of the lower Eel River. Atchison, Topeka and Santa Fe Railway reorganized Fortuna's railroad as the San Francisco and Northwestern Railway in 1903, and then completed the Northwestern Pacific Railroad to San Francisco in 1914. Fortuna became the rail hub for smaller communities like Alton, Fernbridge, Ferndale, Hydesville, Newburg, Port Kenyon, Rohnerville, and Waddington. Fortuna was the location of one of two secondary mills of the storied Pacific Lumber Company, headquartered ten miles (16 km) south in Scotia.

Since Fortuna's earliest days in the 1800s, its nickname has been "The Friendly City."

== Geography ==
According to the United States Census Bureau, the city has a total area of 5.2 square miles (13 km^{2}), nearly all land.

Fortuna is located 7 miles (11 km) from the Pacific coast on the bank of the Eel River. The community is affected by coastal weather patterns with the Pacific Ocean to the west. Fortuna is served by U.S. Route 101, providing direct access to San Francisco 253 miles (407 km) to the south, and to Eureka (the county seat) 14 miles (23 km) to the north. The western terminus of California State Route 36 intersects U.S. Route 101 1 mile (1.6 km) just south of the city limits. Fortuna is surrounded by national, state and county redwood parks, and is the gateway to the redwood forests of Northern California. Sequoia sempervirens grow to about 300 feet (91 m) and live to be 2,500 years old. The 33-mile (53 km) Avenue of the Giants offers views of the area's redwoods, and carries visitors through a number of groves. Stops include Founders Grove, the Visitor Center near Weott and several locations that provide trail access.

=== Climate ===
The area sees summers that are not as foggy as Eureka and Arcata to the north, and run a few degrees warmer. Fortuna has a warm-summer Mediterranean climate (Köppen: Csb) typical of the North Coast that is characterized by warm (but not hot), dry summers, and mild to chilly, rainy winters.

Climate data for Fortuna, California
| Month | Jan | Feb | Mar | Apr | May | Jun | Jul | Aug | Sep | Oct | Nov | Dec | Year |
|---|---|---|---|---|---|---|---|---|---|---|---|---|---|
| Mean daily maximum °F (°C) | 54.4 (12.4) | 55.9 (13.3) | 57.7 (14.3) | 60.1 (15.6) | 63.6 (17.6) | 66.6 (19.2) | 69.3 (20.7) | 70.0 (21.1) | 69.4 (20.8) | 65.0 (18.3) | 58.0 (14.4) | 53.4 (11.9) | 62.0 (16.6) |
| Daily mean °F (°C) | 47.7 (8.7) | 48.7 (9.3) | 50.1 (10.1) | 51.3 (10.7) | 55.8 (13.2) | 58.9 (14.9) | 61.2 (16.2) | 61.9 (16.6) | 60.2 (15.7) | 56.1 (13.4) | 50.7 (10.4) | 46.9 (8.3) | 54.1 (12.3) |
| Mean daily minimum °F (°C) | 41.0 (5.0) | 41.5 (5.3) | 42.5 (5.8) | 44.2 (6.8) | 48.0 (8.9) | 51.1 (10.6) | 53.1 (11.7) | 53.7 (12.1) | 50.9 (10.5) | 47.2 (8.4) | 43.4 (6.3) | 40.4 (4.7) | 46.4 (8.0) |
| Average precipitation inches (mm) | 8.0 (200) | 7.2 (180) | 6.7 (170) | 3.9 (99) | 2.0 (51) | 0.7 (18) | 0.1 (2.5) | 0.3 (7.6) | 0.6 (15) | 2.6 (66) | 6.5 (170) | 10.1 (260) | 48.7 (1,239.1) |
| Average snowfall inches (cm) | 0 (0) | 0.3 (0.76) | 0.1 (0.25) | 0 (0) | 0 (0) | 0 (0) | 0 (0) | 0 (0) | 0 (0) | 0 (0) | 0 (0) | 0 (0) | 0.4 (1.01) |
| Average rainy days | 16.7 | 14.7 | 16.1 | 12.9 | 9.2 | 5.3 | 2.3 | 2.4 | 3.6 | 7.8 | 14.8 | 16.9 | 122.7 |
| Average snowy days | 0.1 | 0.1 | 0.1 | 0 | 0 | 0 | 0 | 0 | 0 | 0 | 0 | 0.1 | 0.4 |

== Demographics ==
Historical population
| Census | Pop. | Note | %± |
|---|---|---|---|
| 1910 | 383 | | — |
| 1920 | 986 | | 157.4% |
| 1930 | 1,239 | | 25.7% |
| 1940 | 1,413 | | 14.0% |
| 1950 | 1,762 | | 24.7% |
| 1960 | 3,523 | | 99.9% |
| 1970 | 4,203 | | 19.3% |
| 1980 | 7,591 | | 80.6% |
| 1990 | 8,788 | | 15.8% |
| 2000 | 10,497 | | 19.4% |
| 2010 | 11,926 | | 13.6% |
| 2020 | 12,516 | | 4.9% |
U.S. Decennial Census

=== 2020 census ===
As of the 2020 census, Fortuna had a population of 12,516 and a population density of 2,384.9 inhabitants per square mile (920.8/km^{2}). The median age was 39.6 years. The age distribution was 23.3% under the age of 18, 8.0% aged 18 to 24, 24.8% aged 25 to 44, 23.5% aged 45 to 64, and 20.4% aged 65 or older. For every 100 females, there were 94.7 males, and for every 100 females age 18 and over there were 92.2 males age 18 and over.

The census reported that 98.4% of the population lived in households, 1.0% lived in non-institutionalized group quarters, and 0.6% were institutionalized. There were 4,956 households, of which 30.1% had children under the age of 18 living in them. Of all households, 42.8% were married-couple households, 9.4% were cohabiting couple households, 18.9% were households with a male householder and no spouse or partner present, and 28.9% were households with a female householder and no spouse or partner present. About 28.4% of all households were made up of individuals and 14.5% had someone living alone who was 65 years of age or older. The average household size was 2.49. There were 3,142 families (63.4% of all households).

There were 5,263 housing units at an average density of 1,002.9 units per square mile (387.2 units/km^{2}). Of these, 4,956 (94.2%) were occupied, and 5.8% were vacant. Of occupied units, 59.0% were owner-occupied and 41.0% were occupied by renters. The homeowner vacancy rate was 1.4% and the rental vacancy rate was 4.7%.

99.6% of residents lived in urban areas, while 0.4% lived in rural areas.

Racial composition as of the 2020 census
| Race | Number | Percent |
|---|---|---|
| White | 9,009 | 72.0% |
| Black or African American | 86 | 0.7% |
| American Indian and Alaska Native | 464 | 3.7% |
| Asian | 156 | 1.2% |
| Native Hawaiian and Other Pacific Islander | 15 | 0.1% |
| Some other race | 1,234 | 9.9% |
| Two or more races | 1,552 | 12.4% |
| Hispanic or Latino (of any race) | 2,590 | 20.7% |

=== 2023 ACS 5-year estimates ===
In 2023, the US Census Bureau estimated that 13.2% of the population were foreign-born. Of all people aged 5 or older, 82.0% spoke only English at home, 15.2% spoke Spanish, 1.8% spoke other Indo-European languages, 0.9% spoke Asian or Pacific Islander languages, and 0.0% spoke other languages. Of those aged 25 or older, 86.0% were high school graduates and 22.8% had a bachelor's degree.

The median household income was $61,603, and the per capita income was $34,278. About 11.7% of families and 16.8% of the population were below the poverty line.

=== 2010 ===
At the 2010 census Fortuna had a population of 11,926. The population density was 2,461.4 inhabitants per square mile (950.4/km^{2}). The racial makeup of Fortuna was 9,686 (81.2%) White, 73 (0.6%) African American, 444 (3.7%) Native American, 106 (0.9%) Asian, 9 (0.1%) Pacific Islander, 1,065 (8.9%) from other races, and 543 (4.6%) from two or more races. Hispanic or Latino of any race were 2,032 persons (17.0%).

The census reported that 11,665 people (97.8% of the population) lived in households, 189 (1.6%) lived in non-institutionalized group quarters, and 72 (0.6%) were institutionalized.

There were 4,688 households, 1,509 (32.2%) had children under the age of 18 living in them, 2,135 (45.5%) were heterosexual married couples living together, 579 (12.4%) had a female householder with no husband present, 279 (6.0%) had a male householder with no wife present. There were 363 (7.7%) unmarried heterosexual partnerships, and 38 (0.8%) homosexual married couples or partnerships. 1,368 households (29.2%) were one person and 683 (14.6%) had someone living alone who was 65 or older. The average household size was 2.49. There were 2,993 families (63.8% of households); the average family size was 3.06.

The age distribution was 2,937 people (24.6%) under the age of 18, 1,192 people (10.0%) aged 18 to 24, 2,681 people (22.5%) aged 25 to 44, 3,050 people (25.6%) aged 45 to 64, and 2,066 people (17.3%) who were 65 or older. The median age was 38.1 years. For every 100 females, there were 93.1 males. For every 100 females age 18 and over, there were 89.7 males.

There were 4,991 housing units at an average density of 1,030.1 per square mile (397.7/km^{2}), of which 4,688 were occupied, 2,747 (58.6%) by the owners and 1,941 (41.4%) by renters. The homeowner vacancy rate was 1.7%; the rental vacancy rate was 6.2%. 6,821 people (57.2% of the population) lived in owner-occupied housing units and 4,844 people (40.6%) lived in rental housing units.

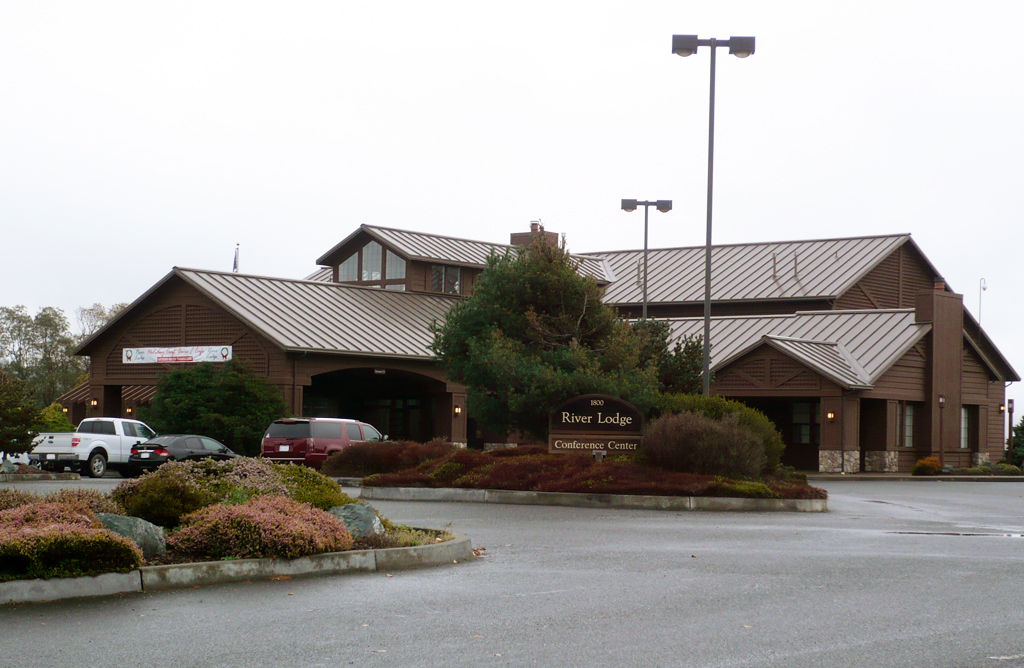
River Lodge attracts meetings and events.

== Economy ==
According to a 2008 Comprehensive Annual Financial Report, the top employers in the city were the City of Fortuna, Eel River Disposal, Fortuna Motors (now defunct), Fortuna Union Elementary School District, Fortuna Union High School District, Redwood Memorial Hospital, Rohnerville School District, Safeway, St. Luke Healthcare and Rehabilitation Center and Wendt Construction.

== Government ==
In the state legislature, Fortuna is the 2nd senatorial district, represented by Democrat Mike McGuire, and the 2nd Assembly district, represented by Democrat Chris Rogers.

Federally, Fortuna is in California's 2nd congressional district, represented by Democrat Jared Huffman.

== Education ==
Fortuna is served by the Fortuna Elementary School District and the Fortuna Union High School.

== Transportation ==
The Amtrak Thruway 7 bus provides daily connections to/from Fortuna (with a curbside stop at 719 South Fortuna Blvd), Martinez to the south, and Arcata to the north. Additional Amtrak connections are available from Martinez station.

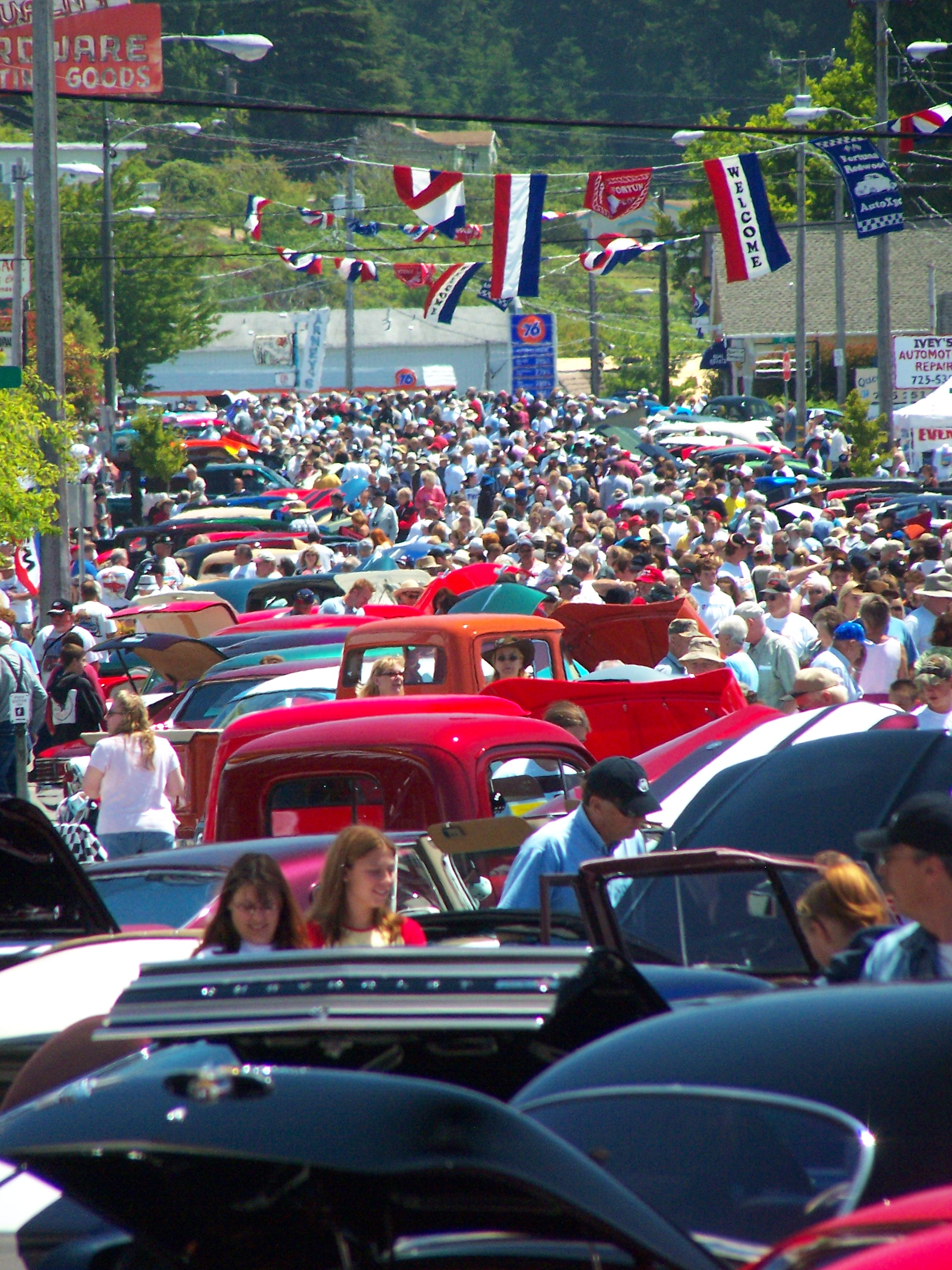
Twenty-thousand visitors fill the town during Fortuna's Redwood AutoXpo.

== Culture ==
The city has a large number of events and festivals, including the Daffodil Festival, Art & Wine in the Park, the Annual Fortuna Rodeo, the Redwood AutoXpo, the Logging Competition, Civil War Days, and Apple Harvest, the Hops in Humboldt festival, the Fortuna Concert Series and holiday events including concerts and parades with performances by Scotia Band Brass Choir and Saxophone Quartet. Additionally, the Eel River was the locale for the Paddle to the Headwaters canoe race.

== Notable people ==
- Jean Buckley, center fielder in the All-American Girls Professional Baseball League
- John A. Campbell, timber executive and president of the Pacific Lumber Company
- Reggie Christiansen, American college baseball coach
- Jon Crosby, American musician and founder of alternative rock band VAST
- Cecelia Holland, historical novelist
- Randy Niemann, major league baseball player, major league baseball coach
- Sam Reynolds, professional soccer player
- Ryan Villopoto, professional supercross and motocross champion; born in Fortuna
