= Rio Dell, California =

City in California, United States

- City
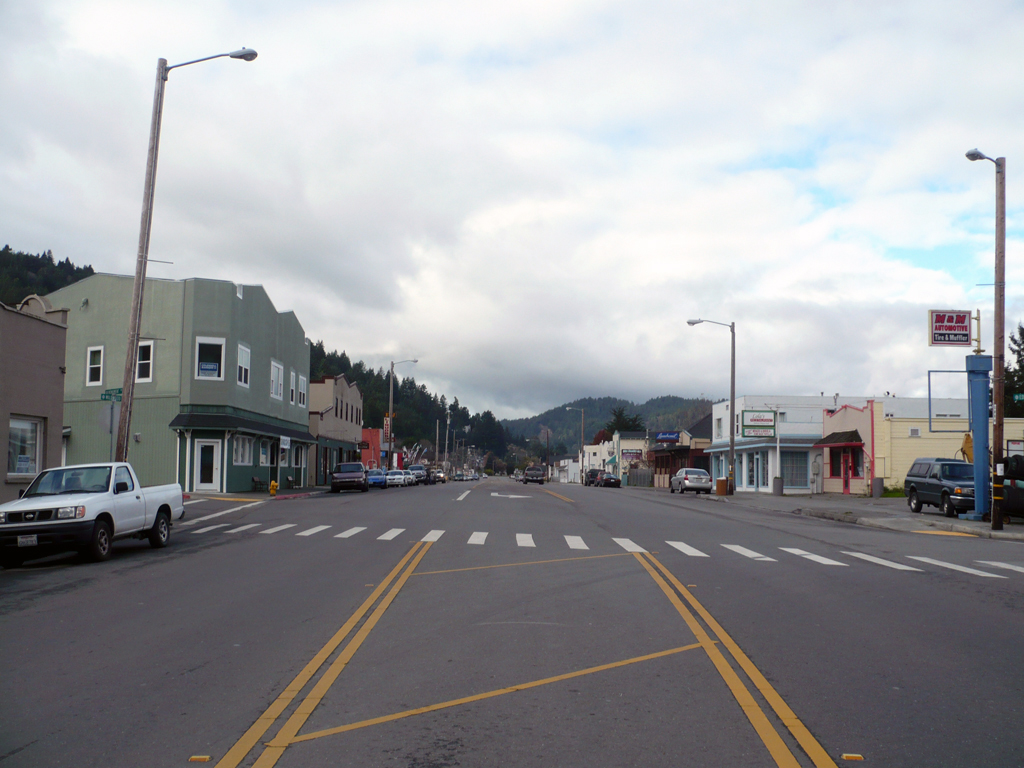
- Wildwood Avenue, Rio Dell

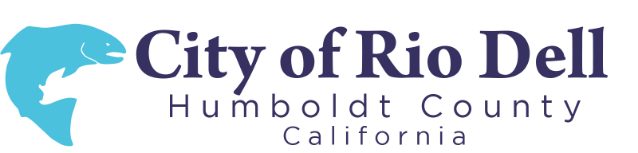
- Interactive map of Rio Dell, California
- Location in the United States Rio Dell (the United States)
- Coordinates: 40°29′57″N 124°06′23″W
- Country: United States
- State: California
- County: Humboldt
- Incorporated: February 23, 1965

Government
  - Mayor: Debra Garnes

Area
  - Total: 2.42 sq mi (6.26 km^{2})
  - Land: 2.28 sq mi (5.91 km^{2})
  - Water: 0.14 sq mi (0.35 km^{2}) 5.61%
- Elevation: 161 ft (49 m)

Population (2020)
  - Total: 3,379
  - Density: 1,468.2/sq mi (566.86/km^{2})
- Time zone: UTC-8 (Pacific (PST))
  - Summer (DST): UTC-7 (PDT)
- ZIP code: 95562
- Area code(s): 707, 369
- FIPS code: 06-60900
- GNIS feature IDs: 277614, 2410951
- Website: cityofriodell.ca.gov

Rio Dell (Spanish: Río Dell, meaning "river," with English "dell," meaning small valley in a woodland) is a city in Humboldt County, California, United States. It is located on the west bank of the Eel River 1 mile (1.6 km) north of Scotia at an elevation of 161 feet (49 m). The population was 3,379 at the 2020 census, up from 3,363 at the 2010 census.

== History ==
Rio Dell was founded and named by businessman Lorenzo Painter, who devised the name as a merging of Spanish río ("river") and English dell ("small wooded valley").

Originally settled on the territories of the Wiyot, Nongatl, and Mattole tribes, Rio Dell was reportedly first dubbed "Tokemuk" by native inhabitants of the land who were thought to be of multiple regional tribes and who uniquely spoke at least two different regional languages. The native presence was greatly diminished following the 1860 Wiyot massacre on Indian Island that extended south to the Eel river valley where Rio Dell is located. From there, the area became known as Eagle Prairie and finally as Rio Dell.

The first post office at Rio Dell opened in 1876. Rio Dell was connected to Scotia by a ferry provided by the lumber mill in Scotia. After the first bridge was destroyed by a flood in 1905, a ferry carried mill workers from Rio Dell upstream to Scotia, and a second ferry carried mill workers downstream to Metropolitan until a suspension bridge was built to Scotia in 1914. Many Italian immigrants lived in what came to be known as Wildwood, south of Rio Dell proper, and known at the time to outsiders as Little Italy. This part of town became popular with mill workers seeking moonshine, gambling, and prostitution unavailable in the company town of Scotia where they were employed. Men came from as far away as Eureka to enjoy these illegal entertainments, or to engage in recreational fighting, the downtown very soon becoming known as Wildwood. Rio Dell's main street still carries the name Wildwood Avenue. In 1928 buildings on both sides of this street were engulfed by a fire started by a moonshine still. The fire endangered the bridge to Scotia and prevented the Scotia Fire Department from crossing the bridge to help extinguish the fire.

Rio Dell became home to the workforce for one of the largest lumber mills in the world, the Pacific Lumber Company. It was often the first home of immigrants to the United States and Humboldt County, particularly for the young Italian and Portuguese immigrant workforce of the early 20th century. Rio Dell was incorporated in 1965 as a result of changing demographics, a post-war population expansion and the reluctance of the local Sheriff to provide law enforcement services to what was perceived as a dangerous and remote community. The primary benefit of municipal incorporation being a city's ability to create its own armed police department under local control. The department totaled 14 sworn officers shortly after obtaining city status. Following the city's incorporation in 1965 a series of events over the next two decades led to the economic decline of the community, including the opening of a new freeway bypass and the eventual demise of Pacific Lumber Company (Palco) as a significant employer.

Rio Dell was impacted by the 2022 Ferndale earthquake.

== Geography ==
According to the United States Census Bureau, the city has a total area of 2.4 square miles (6.2 km^{2}), of which 2.3 square miles (6.0 km^{2}) is land and 0.1 square miles (0.26 km^{2}), or 5.61%, is water.

=== Climate ===
This region experiences warm (but not hot) and dry summers, with no average monthly temperatures above 71.6 °F (22.0 °C). According to the Köppen Climate Classification system, Rio Dell has a warm-summer Mediterranean climate, abbreviated Csb on climate maps.

Climate data for Rio Dell
Month	Jan	Feb	Mar	Apr	May	Jun	Jul	Aug	Sep	Oct	Nov	Dec	Year
Record high °F (°C)	76 (24)	82 (28)	86 (30)	90 (32)	97 (36)	98 (37)	102 (39)	96 (36)	98 (37)	97 (36)	81 (27)	73 (23)	102 (39)
Mean daily maximum °F (°C)	55.3 (12.9)	57.4 (14.1)	58.5 (14.7)	60.3 (15.7)	63.2 (17.3)	66.3 (19.1)	69.1 (20.6)	70.3 (21.3)	70.9 (21.6)	67.3 (19.6)	60.5 (15.8)	55.6 (13.1)	62.9 (17.2)
Daily mean °F (°C)	47.8 (8.8)	49.5 (9.7)	50.4 (10.2)	52.3 (11.3)	55.5 (13.1)	58.7 (14.8)	60.9 (16.1)	61.7 (16.5)	60.9 (16.1)	57.6 (14.2)	52.4 (11.3)	48.3 (9.1)	54.7 (12.6)
Mean daily minimum °F (°C)	40.3 (4.6)	41.6 (5.3)	42.6 (5.9)	44.3 (6.8)	47.7 (8.7)	51.1 (10.6)	52.8 (11.6)	53.1 (11.7)	50.9 (10.5)	47.8 (8.8)	44.2 (6.8)	41.1 (5.1)	46.4 (8.0)
Record low °F (°C)	20 (−7)	23 (−5)	29 (−2)	32 (0)	33 (1)	40 (4)	40 (4)	41 (5)	37 (3)	28 (−2)	27 (−3)	17 (−8)	41 (5)
Average precipitation inches (mm)	8.8 (220)	7.5 (190)	6.5 (170)	3.5 (89)	1.7 (43)	0.6 (15)	0.1 (2.5)	0.2 (5.1)	0.6 (15)	3.0 (76)	6.4 (160)	9.2 (230)	48.1 (1,220)
Average precipitation days	16	15	15	12	9	5	2	2	3	8	14	16	117

== Demographics ==
Historical population
Census	Pop.	Note	%±
1890	213		—
1950	1,862		—
1960	3,222		73.0%
1970	2,817		−12.6%
1980	2,687		−4.6%
1990	3,012		12.1%
2000	3,174		5.4%
2010	3,368		6.1%
2020	3,379		0.3%
U.S. Decennial Census

=== 2020 census ===
As of the 2020 census, Rio Dell had a population of 3,379. The population density was 1,481.4 inhabitants per square mile (572.0/km^{2}).

Racial composition as of the 2020 census
Race	Number	Percent
White	2,618	77.5%
Black or African American	30	0.9%
American Indian and Alaska Native	119	3.5%
Asian	24	0.7%
Native Hawaiian and Other Pacific Islander	1	0.0%
Some other race	217	6.4%
Two or more races	370	10.9%
Hispanic or Latino (of any race)	487	14.4%

The census reported that the whole population lived in households. There were 1,328 households, out of which 31.2% included children under the age of 18, 40.1% were married-couple households, 12.6% were cohabiting couple households, 28.0% had a female householder with no partner present, and 19.4% had a male householder with no partner present. 24.8% of households were one person, and 11.5% were one person aged 65 or older. The average household size was 2.54. There were 861 families (64.8% of all households).

The age distribution was 22.6% under the age of 18, 8.1% aged 18 to 24, 28.7% aged 25 to 44, 22.3% aged 45 to 64, and 18.3% who were 65 years of age or older. The median age was 38.0 years. For every 100 females, there were 99.4 males, and for every 100 females age 18 and over there were 96.3 males age 18 and over.

There were 1,442 housing units at an average density of 632.2 units per square mile (244.1 units/km^{2}), of which 1,328 (92.1%) were occupied. Of these, 55.1% were owner-occupied, and 44.9% were occupied by renters. 7.9% of housing units were vacant. The homeowner vacancy rate was 1.9% and the rental vacancy rate was 5.2%.

0.0% of residents lived in urban areas, while 100.0% lived in rural areas.

=== Income and poverty ===
In 2023, the US Census Bureau estimated that the median household income was $46,055, and the per capita income was $24,427. About 9.1% of families and 12.8% of the population were below the poverty line.

=== 2010 census ===
At the 2010 census Rio Dell had a population of 3,368. The population density was 1,393.2 inhabitants per square mile (537.9/km^{2}). The racial makeup of Rio Dell was 2,894 (85.9%) White, 13 (0.4%) African American, 125 (3.7%) Native American, 25 (0.7%) Asian, 3 (0.1%) Pacific Islander, 140 (4.2%) from other races, and 168 (5.0%) from two or more races. Hispanic or Latino of any race were 384 people (11.4%).

The census reported that 3,347 people (99.4% of the population) lived in households, 21 (0.6%) lived in non-institutionalized group quarters, and no one was institutionalized.

There were 1,367 households, 440 (32.2%) had children under the age of 18 living in them, 560 (41.0%) were opposite-sex married couples living together, 199 (14.6%) had a female householder with no husband present, 85 (6.2%) had a male householder with no wife present. There were 131 (9.6%) unmarried opposite-sex partnerships, and 13 (1.0%) same-sex married couples or partnerships. 409 households (29.9%) were one person and 139 (10.2%) had someone living alone who was 65 or older. The average household size was 2.45. There were 844 families (61.7% of households); the average family size was 2.99.

The age distribution was 803 people (23.8%) under the age of 18, 309 people (9.2%) aged 18 to 24, 824 people (24.5%) aged 25 to 44, 989 people (29.4%) aged 45 to 64, and 443 people (13.2%) who were 65 or older. The median age was 38.3 years. For every 100 females, there were 96.7 males. For every 100 females age 18 and over, there were 91.7 males.

There were 1,442 housing units at an average density of 596.5 per square mile (230.3/km^{2}), of which 1,367 were occupied, 774 (56.6%) by the owners and 593 (43.4%) by renters. The homeowner vacancy rate was 0.6%; the rental vacancy rate was 2.8%. 1,952 people (58.0% of the population) lived in owner-occupied housing units and 1,395 people (41.4%) lived in rental housing units.

== Government ==
=== Local government ===
Rio Dell has a council–manager form of government. The City Council sets policy, while the City Manager carries out the day-to-day business of the city. The Mayor is selected by the City Council and serves as the presiding officer at city council meetings, and as the official head of the city for legislative and ceremonial purposes.

As of 2025, the Rio Dell City Council consisted of Mayor Debra Garnes, Amanda Carter, Julie Woodall, Robert Orr, and Frank Wilson. The City Manager is Kyle Knopp.

=== State and federal representation ===
In the state legislature, Rio Dell is in the 2nd senatorial district, represented by Democrat Mike McGuire, and the 2nd Assembly district, represented by Democrat Chris Rogers.

Federally, Rio Dell is in California's 2nd congressional district, represented by Democrat Jared Huffman.
