= John A. Campbell =

John A. Campbell may refer to:

- John Archibald Campbell (1811–1889), U.S. Supreme Court justice and Confederate official
- John Allen Campbell (1835–1880), first Governor of the Wyoming Territory
- John A. Campbell (Manitoba politician) (1872–1963), Manitoba politician
- John Angus Campbell (born 1942), U.S. professor of rhetoric
- John A. Campbell (lumber executive)
- John Argentine Campbell (1877–1917), Scottish rugby union player

== See also ==
- John Campbell (disambiguation)
