= Hydraulic debarker =

Machine for removing bark from wooden logs by the use of water under pressure

A hydraulic debarker is a machine removing bark from wooden logs by the use of water under a pressure of 700 kilopascals (100 pounds per square inch) or greater. Hydraulic debarking can reduce soil and rock content of bark, but may increase the water content. Debarking water may be recycled after effective settling, but suspended solids may increase wear on high-pressure pumps. Hydraulic debarking has declined where water quality problems have arisen.

== History ==
Bark on mature redwood trees of coastal California can vary from 10 to 46 centimetres (4 to 18 in) in thickness. Redwood bark is thick, stringy and tough; and can cause sawmill machinery to malfunction. Men called peelers removed bark from fallen trees in the woods through the early 20th century, but the process was dangerous and labor intensive. In the mid-20th century hydraulic barkers were built at several large sawmills including the Union Lumber Company at Fort Bragg, California, the Northern Redwood Company at Korbel, and the Pacific Lumber Company at Scotia, California. The last was featured in a popular sawmill tour.

== Operation ==
Although less expensive mechanical debarkers were adequate for smaller logs harvested from young trees on redwood tree farms, hydraulic barkers remained in operation until all old growth trees had been harvested from company timberlands. The United States Environmental Protection Agency published hydraulic barking category effluent limitations in the 1970s. Wastewater discharged from debarking could average no more than 2.5 pounds of biochemical oxygen demand (BOD) and 12 pounds of total suspended solids (TSS) per thousand board feet of lumber produced (0.5 kg BOD and 2.3 kg TSS per cubic meter of lumber). Daily waste discharge rates could be three times as high as 30-day averages, but pH was required to remain between 6 and 9.
