= Mendocino Redwood Company =

American forest products company

Mendocino Redwood Company (MRC)
- Company type: Limited liability company
- Industry: forest management, logging
- Founded: July 1998
- Headquarters: near Ukiah, California, USA
- Key people: Mike Jani (Chief Forester)
- Products: Forest products
- Owner: Fisher Family of San Francisco, others
- Number of employees: 43
- Parent: Sansome Partners, L.P
- Website: www.mrc.com

The Mendocino Redwood Company (or MRC), is a California based forest products company, which operates one mill in Ukiah, with holdings of over 228,800 acres (926 km^{2}), primarily in Mendocino County.

== Background ==
This relatively new timber company owns and manages ten percent of the county's private land. Founded in 1998, the Fisher Family, founders of Gap Clothing, are the majority stake owners. It was started to acquire part of the California timberland of Louisiana-Pacific.

Mendocino Redwood Company utilizes herbicide applications to reduce tanoak density and restore conifer forests. The application and quantity of use is regulated by the Mendocino Agricultural Commission. California is the second largest forestland state in the United States, second to Alaska. Mendocino County has one of the largest percentages of the state's overall forest land.

== Growth ==
Following a July 29, 2008 "Final Order" from the US Bankruptcy Judge Richard Schmidt, the way cleared for MRC to take control of the once storied, then vilified, and, finally, bankrupt Pacific Lumber Company in Humboldt County, California from Maxxam Inc. of Texas. The final dispensation of the bankruptcy, which had been ongoing since January 2007, began the transfer of PALCO's buildings, mill, and 210,000 acres (850 km^{2}) of Humboldt forest to MRC. The company town of Scotia and other properties were transferred to Marathon Structured Finance.

== Humboldt ==
The consolidation of Pacific Lumber Company (PALCO) and subsidiaries is under the new name of Humboldt Redwood Company, which began operations ostensibly with a more conservative harvesting model that eliminates clearcutting and most old-growth redwood cutting.

== Certification ==
Mendocino Redwood Company was given a well managed certification of timber management practices. This certification was issued by the Forest Stewardship Council. The certification study was conducted by Scientific Certification Systems.
