= Jean Buckley =

American baseball player (1931–2019)

- Center field
- Born: December 4, 1931; Dorchester, Massachusetts, U.S.
- Died: July 7, 2019 (aged 87); Fortuna, California, U.S.
- Batted: Right Threw: Right

Teams
- Kenosha Comets (1950–1951); Rockford Peaches (1952)

Career highlights and awards
- Two postseason appearances (1950, 1952); Women in Baseball – AAGPBL Permanent Display at Baseball Hall of Fame and Museum (1988)

Jean Buckley ["Bucketts"] (December 4, 1931 – July 7, 2019) was an American center fielder who played from 1950 through 1952 in the All-American Girls Professional Baseball League (AAGPBL). Listed at 5 ft 9 in (1.75 m), 145 lb (66 kg), Buckley batted and threw right-handed. She was born in Dorchester, Boston, Massachusetts.

Buckley was a solid outfielder and clutch hitter during her three years in the league, turning into a feared batter in two postseasons, although her teams failed to win the title in any of them.

She started to play softball at age 12 for a Catholic Youth Organization team in her hometown. As a teenager, she played with the Quincy Raiderettes, an amateur fastpitch softball team. At the time she was scouted by Mary Pratt, a former AAGPBL pitcher, who invited her and other girls to a tryout in a gym at Everett, Massachusetts. "I never threw a baseball in my life", she explained in an interview. "I played softball in Boston. No sliding, no stealing; a team sport not dominated by a pitcher; C.Y.O. [at] Boston Parks. I was a natural".

Buckley was admitted in the league and went to spring training in West Baden, Indiana. She opened the 1950 season with the Kenosha Comets, playing for them two years before joining the Rockford Peaches (1952). She usually was placed fifth in the batting order but could also fill in at cleanup spot if needed. "I played at centerfield, right a little... I batted fifth, couldn't handle the fourth place pressure", she recalled.

In her rookie year, Buckley batted a .207 average with 22 runs batted in and a slugging of .297 in 71 games, helping Kenosha reach the playoffs after losing the first round a year before; however, the Comets once again failed to advance to the finals. She went 4-for-10 (.400) with a triple, one run and one RBI in a lost cause.

Her most productive season came with the Peaches in 1952, when she posted career numbers in games played (96) home runs (4), hits (62), doubles and RBI (35), to have a shot at getting back into the playoffs. She went 4-for-4 with four RBI against the Fort Wayne Daisies in the third and decisive game of the first round, to back up a six-hit, 6–0 shutout by Migdalia Pérez and secure a spot in the best-of-five final series. In all, Buckley batted .500 (6-for-12) with two homers, a double and six RBI in the first round, and squeezed in the winning run to edge the South Bend Blue Sox in Game 3 of the finals, but it took all seven games for South Bend to be declared the champion team.

Following her baseball career, Buckley moved to Redwood City, California, where she played for the local softball team and travelled the great state. In 1954 her whole family moved to Redwood City to see her playing on the team. She then attended San Francisco State College and earned a degree in 1954. She taught at elementary and junior high school for the next 29 years and retired in 1995.

She later lived in Fortuna, California, and attended AAGPBL Players Association reunions. The association was largely responsible for the opening of Women in Baseball, a permanent display based at the Baseball Hall of Fame and Museum in Cooperstown, New York, which was unveiled in 1988 to honor the entire All-American Girls Professional Baseball League.

Jean Buckley died on July 7, 2019, at the age of 87.

== Career statistics ==
Batting

GP	AB	R	H	2B	3B	HR	RBI	SB	TB	BB	SO	BA	OBP	SLG
255	827	77	165	20	6	7	88	33	218	66	149	.200	.259	.264

Fielding

GP	PO	A	E	TC	DP	FA
245	338	35	41	414	9	.901
