= Metropolitan, California =

Unincorporated community in California, United States

Metropolitan
- Unincorporated community
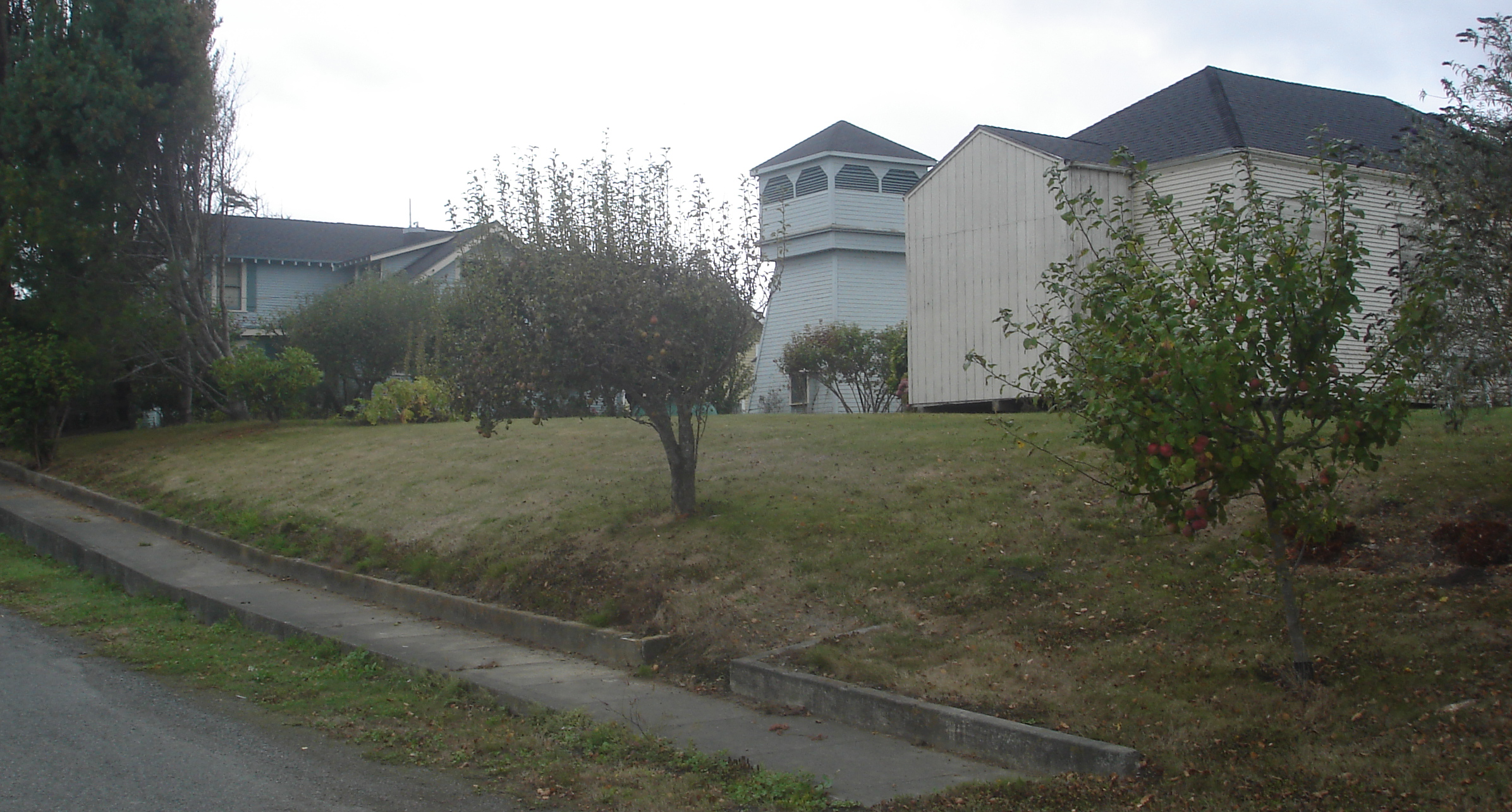
- Concrete sidewalks at the bend in the road through 21st century dairy pastures identify the former company town of Metropolitan, California.

- Location in California Metropolitan (the United States)
- Coordinates: 40°30′53″N 124°08′41″W
- Country: United States
- State: California
- County: Humboldt
- Elevation: 72 ft (22 m)

Metropolitan is an unincorporated community in Humboldt County, California, United States. It is located on McDairmid Prairie, on the north side of the Eel River floodplain, three miles downstream of Scotia, at an elevation of 72 feet (22 m).

== History ==
The location was formerly a company town of 25 homes with a hotel and store for sawmill workers of the Metropolitan Redwood Lumber Company organized in 1904 by owners in Michigan and Wisconsin. Company timberlands on Slater Creek were reached by a railroad trestle across the Eel River. The timber was logged out in the 1920s, and the sawmill burned in 1932. Most of the employee housing was moved to Rio Dell by 1937. The railway trestle and 62-room hotel were destroyed by the Eel River flood of 23 December 1964.

== Metropolitan Redwood Lumber Company Locomotives ==
| Number | Builder | Type | Date | Works number | Notes |
|---|---|---|---|---|---|
| 1 | Lima Locomotive Works | Shay locomotive | 3 May 1907 | 1836 | purchased new; became Pacific Lumber Company #36 in October 1935 |
| 2 | Lima Locomotive Works | Shay locomotive | 24 December 1904 | 867 | formerly Amador Central Railway #2 (Ione, California); purchased 1912; scrapped c1939 |
