= Alton & Pacific Railroad =

Defunct railroad in California

Overview
- Headquarters: Alton, California
- Dates of operation: 1969–1989

Technical
- Track gauge: 2 ft (610 mm)
- Length: 3/4 mile

The Alton & Pacific Railroad was 2 ft (610 mm) gauge tourist railroad at Alton, California, that ran from 1969 until 1989.

== History ==
In 1966, Frank Bayliss purchased the site of a burned out lumber mill near Alton. He spent three years clearing the site and laying narrow gauge track. The railroad included a roundhouse, a turntable and a water tank.

In 1968, Bayliss acquired a 1935 Orenstein & Koppel steam locomotive. It had been taken to the US from Germany after World War II. He made some cosmetic changes to the locomotive and added a home-built tender.

The railroad opened on 4 July 1969.

After the railroad shut down in 1989, Bayliss sold the railroad to an entrepreneur who planned to use the equipment at an island resort he wanted to create in the South Pacific. In 2007, Peter Nott acquired the two locomotives for the Bitter Creek Western Railroad. They then moved to his private Norgrove Railway in Arroyo Grande CA.

== Rolling stock ==
| Number | Builder | Type | Works number | Date | Notes |
|---|---|---|---|---|---|
| 5 | Orenstein & Koppel | 0-4-0T | 12676 | 1935 | Fired on local wood |
| | Fowler | 0-6-0T | 9460 | 1903 | Built for Colonial Sugar Refining Co, Lautoka Fiji. This locomotive was apparently never operated on the A&P |
| | Plymouth | 8-ton diesel | | | Acquired in 1972 from a clay pit in Lincoln, Nebraska |

Bayliss built two yellow 4 wheel passenger cars: an observation car and a combine. There were also a couple of flat cars.
