= Debarking (lumber) =

Process of removing bark from wood

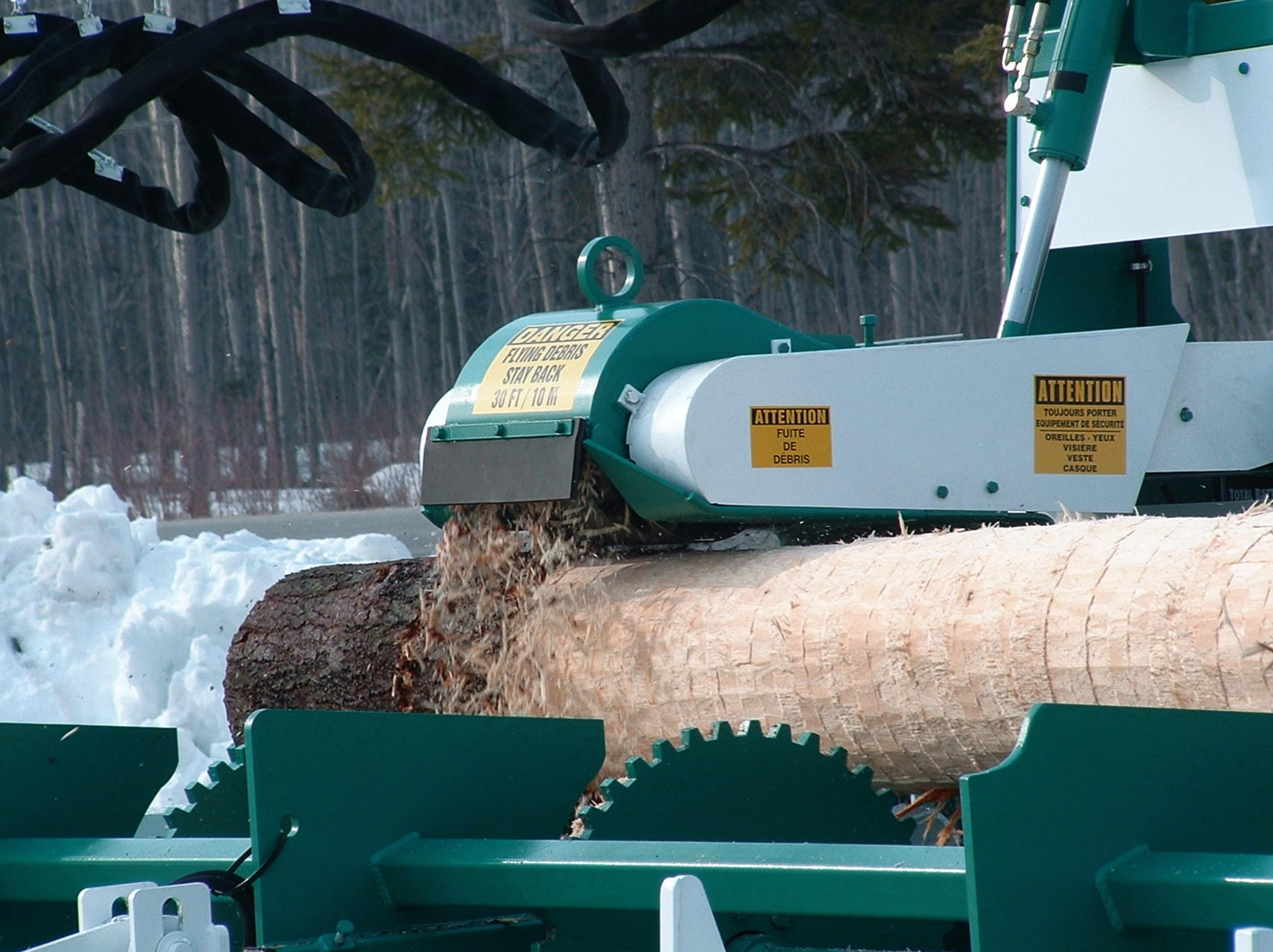
Debarker machine

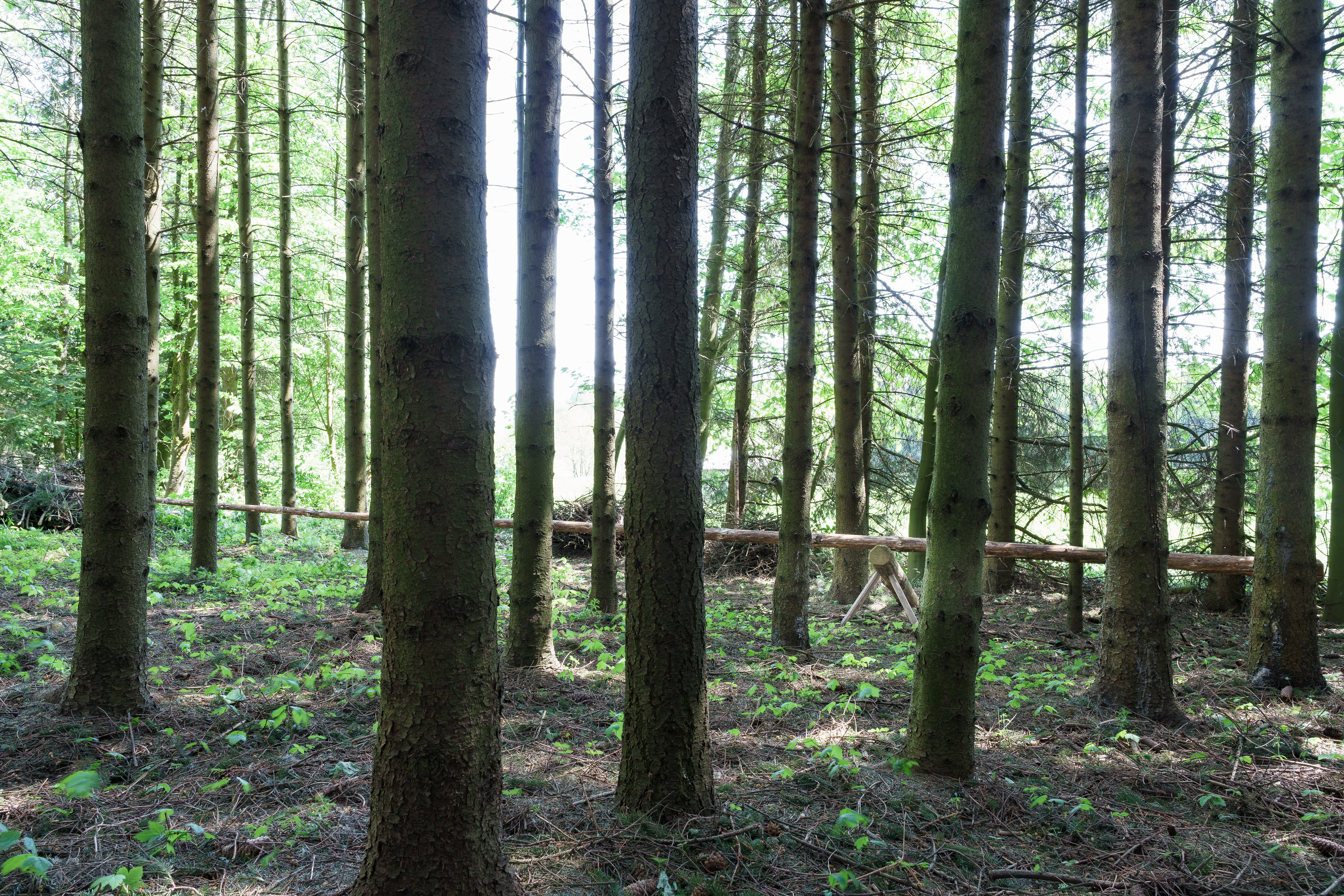
Manually decorticated trunk of a spruce as protection to bark beetles

Debarking is the process of removing bark from wood. Traditional debarking is conducted in order to create a fence post or fence stake which would then go on to be pointed before being planted. Debarking can occur naturally during powerful tornadoes, such as the 2013 Moore tornado.

== Process ==
Debarking generally involves the use of industrial machinery into which the log or stake is placed. These machines can be either stationary or portable. Generally they are powered by hydraulic motors but can also be driven by a power take-off. The log or stake is then pressed against blades or knives which remove the bark while the log is turned to ensure the removal of bark from all around the log. Debarking can also take place by hand, although this can be very time consuming and may not be suitable for large volumes.

== Side-streams from debarking ==
Bark is the usual side-stream produced during log debarking. In several wood-related industries, such as plywood, veneer and laminated veneer industries, the logs, before debarking them, are submerged in warm water to ease the debarking process. The process conditions (temperature and time) depend on the country, company, wood species and their properties. In some countries, such as Finland, the water used in this process is discarded, but studies prove that it accumulates several valuable compounds, such as glucosides, proanthocyanidins and phenolics. This water is a promising side-stream that should be further studied.

== See also ==
- Hydraulic debarker
- Girdling
- Media related to Debarking at Wikimedia Commons
