= Pacific Lumber Company =

Forest products company in Scotia, California, U.S

The Pacific Lumber Company PALCO
- Type: Subsidiary
- Industry: logging, milling
- Founded: 1863
- Defunct: 2008; 18 years ago
- Successor: Humboldt Redwood Company
- Headquarters: Scotia, California (operations); San Francisco, California (business)
- Key people: George O'Brien CEO; Frank Bacik, Vice President and General Counsel; Michael Claes, Spokesman
- Products: forest products
- Owner: Maxxam Inc of Texas (1985-2008)
- Number of employees: 350

The Pacific Lumber Company, officially abbreviated PALCO, and also commonly known as PL, was one of California's major logging and sawmill operations, located 28 miles (45 km) south of Eureka and 244 miles (393 km) north of San Francisco. Begun in 1863, PALCO was managed over most of the twentieth century by generations of the Simon J. Murphy, Sr. family, or managers chosen by the Murphys, from 1905 through 1985. Primary operations existed in massive log storage and milling operations at the historic company town of Scotia, California, located adjacent to US 101 along the Eel River. Secondary mills were located in nearby Fortuna and Carlotta. PALCO had extensive timber holdings exceeding well over 200,000 acres (890 km²) in the Redwood and Douglas-Fir forests of Humboldt County. For generations, it was one of the largest private employers in the entire region, appropriately known as the Redwood Empire.

The company was transformed into a wholly owned subsidiary of Maxxam, Inc for its two final decades. In January 2007 the company filed for bankruptcy protection. On July 29, 2008, the "Final Order" from US Bankruptcy attorney, Judge Richard Schmidt, led to the transfer of the assets of the bankrupt PALCO and all its subsidiaries to the Mendocino Redwood Company and the town of Scotia to Marathon Structured Finance. After 145 years as PALCO, the new company is known as the Humboldt Redwood Company. Some of the affected parties, including Bank of New York Trust Company, filed an appeal and on September 29, 2009 the Court of Appeals for the 5th Circuit modified this judgment. However, the asset transfer and resulting companies were little changed by the modification and no other adjustments of any significance have occurred since.

== Overview ==
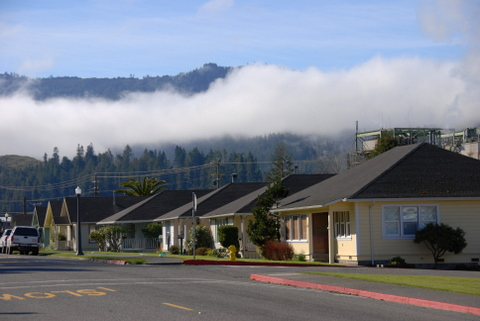
Company town of Scotia

The Pacific Lumber Company was started in 1863. Though it employed over 350 people in its final days in 2008, there were over 1,600 employees at the turn of the millennium. The company itself was a tourist attraction that once welcomed visitors for a tour of the (now permanently closed) largest Redwood Mill ever constructed, which included an unusual hydraulic debarker. The quaint town adjacent to the mill is still open to public visits. Pacific Lumber has been at the center of multiple controversies since a hostile takeover by Maxxam, Inc. (of Texas), that was completed in 1986. The company maintains that it is still a sustainable operation, but its policies and practices bear little resemblance to those before 1986. 1999 saw the sale of thousands of acres of land to become the Headwaters Forest Reserve. In that agreement, strict rules were put into place requiring the company to manage its holdings under more-restrictive practices. This in part led PALCO to file for bankruptcy in January 2007. By late in 2008 The Pacific Lumber Company ceased to exist.

== History ==
=== 19th century ===
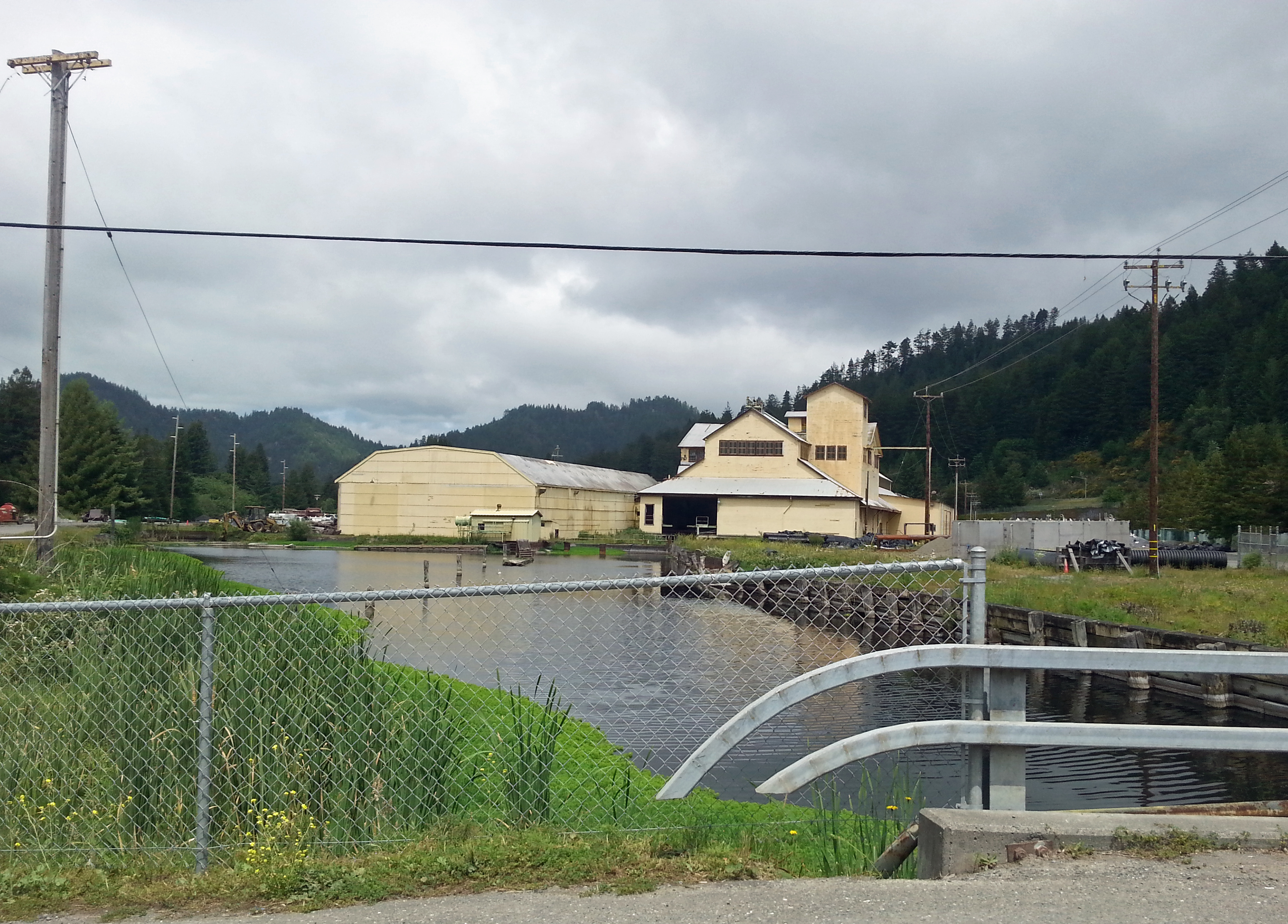
The Scotia Mill and log pond

Pacific Lumber (or PL, as locals have known it for generations) began during the heat of the US Civil War in 1863 when A. W. McPherson and Henry Wetherbee purchased 6,000 acres (24 km^{2}) of timberland on California's Eel River at the rate of $1.25 per acre. Over the ensuing 20 years they added more partners and began significant logging by 1882, at the present main site and town, which was originally known as Forestville. By 1888, the company became the largest in Humboldt County, with 300 employees and lumber shipments exceeding 20,000,000 board feet (47,000 m^{3}) annually. By this time the town name was changed to Scotia and it boasted a Western Union telegraph station, church, post office, and school. In 1895, the company suffered a major setback as the entire town burned, suffering $400,000 in losses ($8,000,000 in today's terms). By that time, Simon J. Murphy, Sr. a Detroit business man and one of its first millionaires had consolidated his millions from Detroit and Southern California into PL. The Simon Murphy family, Stanwood Murphy and his direct descendants would be the controllers of the company for nearly a century The way they took care of business was shown handily after the big fire as they chose to rebuild everything, despite the fact that insurance covered only 25% of losses.

=== 20th century ===
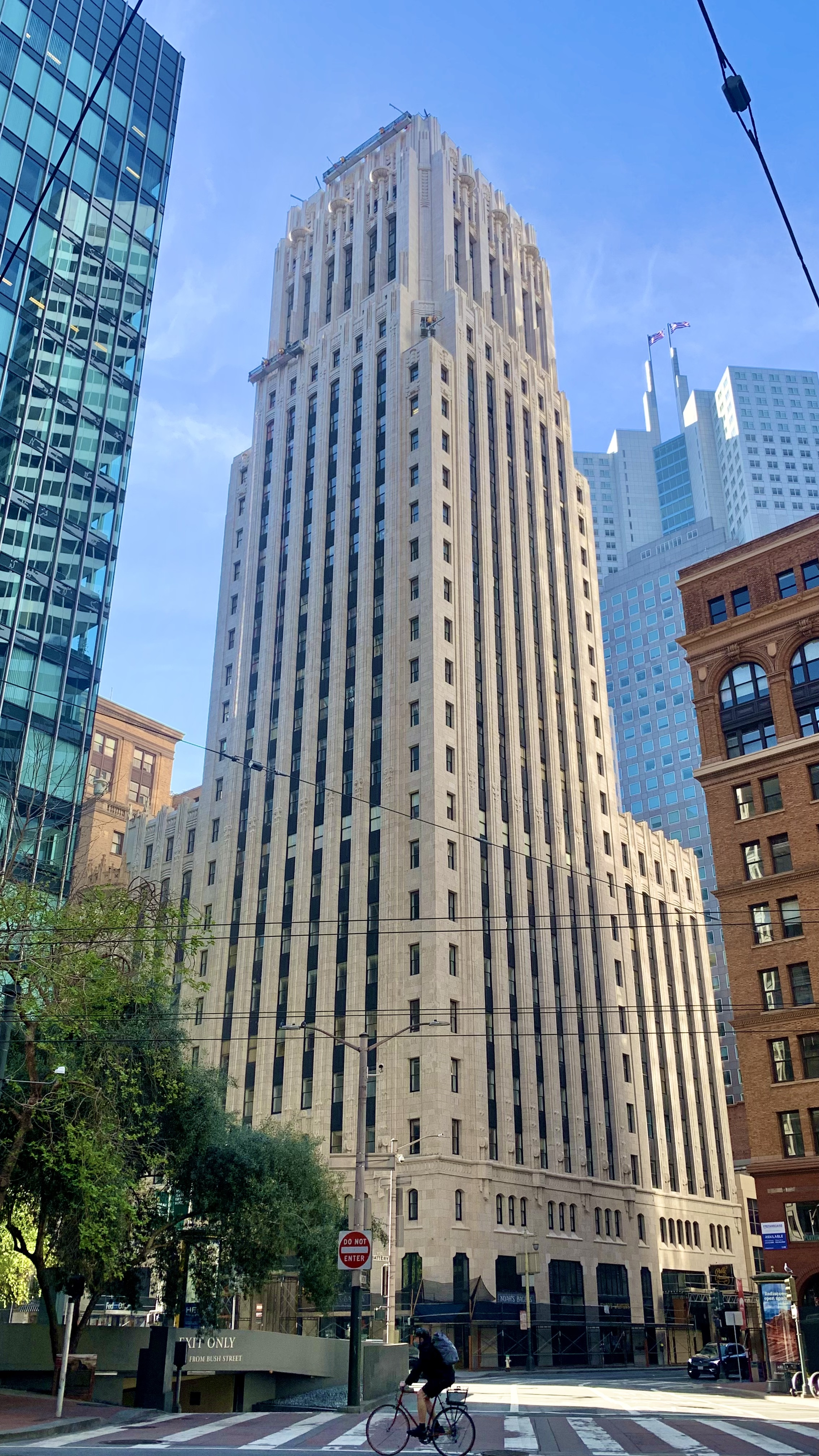
PALCO Sales Headquarters were on the 24th floor of the Shell Building in San Francisco from 1931 to 1965.

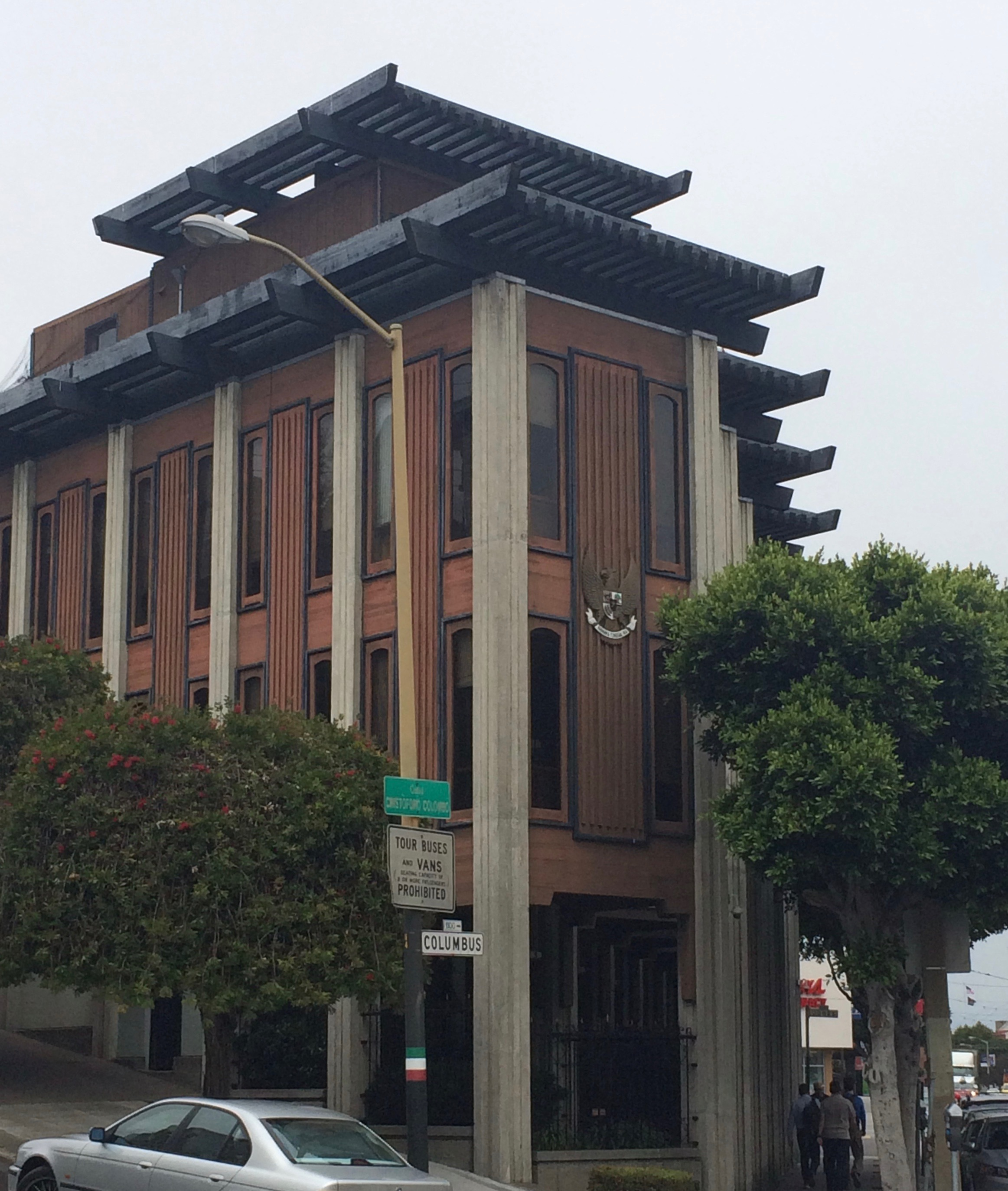
PALCO Business Headquarters were at 1111 Columbus Avenue in San Francisco from 1965 to 1983.

Life during early 20th century lumbering is documented by the Neill family’s Photo Album, which features 292 photographs of the Neill family, townspeople, and daily life in the company town of Scotia. Images reflect everyday life and hardships, local residents and homes, vacations, trips into the surrounding forest, and Pacific Lumber Company’s mill and work operations, between the years of 1908 and 1913. The Neil Photo Album is available for viewing at Humboldt State University’s Special Collections.

By 1905, Simon Murphy, Sr., originally of Detroit, Michigan and later of Whittier, California, completed the process of gaining control of the company. Through the rebuilding of San Francisco after the 1906 San Francisco earthquake, World War I, and numerous floods on the Eel River, the company came into the modern age. By 1920 the company had 1,500 employees and 65,000 acres (260 km^{2}) of timberland. Beginning in the same decade, company management began participating in the preservation movement, primarily as a result of pressure from the Save the Redwoods League in San Francisco. Portions of prior PL holdings including the Rockefeller Forest, the world's largest remaining contiguous old growth Redwood Forest to survive, now comprises the core of Humboldt Redwoods State Park. Further developments included recycling of sawdust into the world's first Presto logs.

In 1931, Stanwood Murphy became president of the company. His unique foresight led to a drastic change in practices from the industry standard of clear cutting to a "selective cut" system of logging. This meant that the company would limit cutting to a maximum of 70 percent of the mature trees in a stand, leaving the younger, most vigorous trees to hold the soil and seed a new generation of forest. He also instituted the concept of "sustainable yield," which directed planners to never cut more than the company's forests could replace by new growth in any year. These practices were hailed as revolutionary and he and his direct heirs ran the company in this manner for the next 55 years.

By the 1950s, PALCO efforts to make Scotia a comfortable place to live and raise a family provided the following in the company town: affordable employee housing, stores, a school, a hospital, a skating rink, and a theatre. Under the Murphy family, the company implemented an employee pension plan, and provided free life insurance. By 1961, academic scholarships were also provided to students who were children of company employees.

On December 17, 1975, common stock for the Pacific Lumber Company was listed on the New York Stock Exchange under the ticker symbol PL.

=== Late 20th century ===
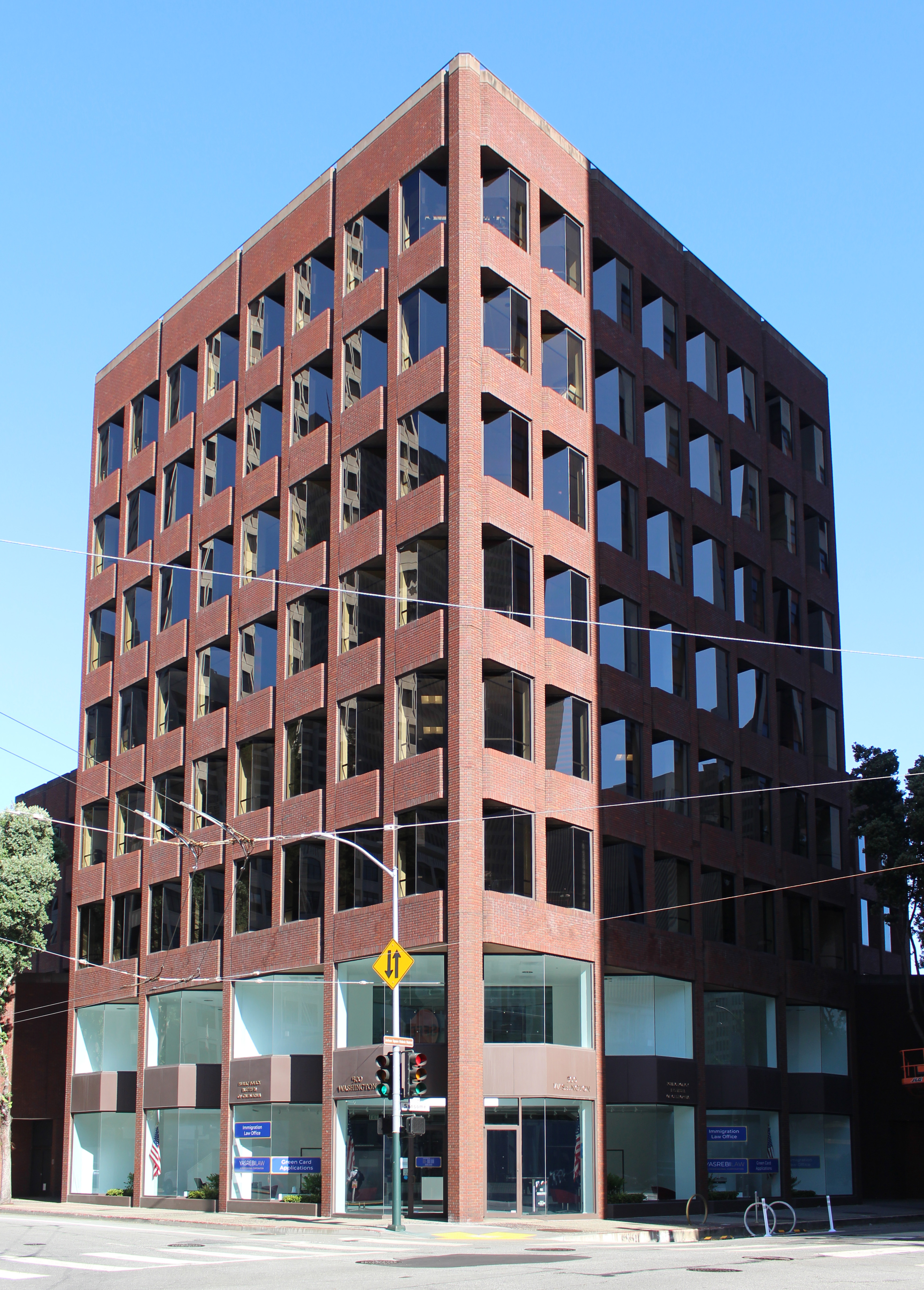
PALCO San Francisco headquarters building built in 1983.

By the 1980s, this huge lumber operation had absolutely no debt, holding a partially diversified portfolio that included a high-rise building in San Francisco and lucrative welding operation in the San Francisco Bay Area, all derived from the company's 100-year-plan based on sustained yield directed cutting and profits carefully spent to protect cash flow. These long-term plans consequently and purposely led to a relatively low profit annually, which unwittingly were about to make the company vulnerable to "new" acquisition practices from Wall Street. The last Murphy to manage the company under these circumstances, Warren Murphy, reflected on what it was like to run such a stable enterprise with sound environmental practices: "We were the good guys. It was fun, it was easy—it was a great life."

=== 1985 hostile takeover ===
On September 30, 1985, the venerable Pacific Lumber Company, having maneuvered through more than a century of business peaks and valleys, was taken over as a result of stock purchases culminating on September 27, 1985. The Murphy family (the largest minority stock holders at the time) and countless previous stockholders, mostly company employees, were relieved of their stock as a result of a hostile takeover by Charles Hurwitz and his Maxxam, Inc. corporation of Texas.

On February 26, 1986, the day after the completed takeover, Warren Murphy resigned, turning over the company to John A. Campbell, a man who had been one of his executive vice presidents. However, despite the indisputable changes in the tenor and management of the company, portions of its last major holding of contiguous old growth forest were ultimately preserved, as environmental groups and government agencies worked towards a deal that led to the creation of the Headwaters Forest in 1999 in exchange for $480 million in public funding.

==== Clearcutting introduced under Maxxam ====
Between a desire to turn a higher profit and the need to start paying off the debt incurred from acquiring Pacific Lumber, Hurwitz's Maxxam replaced the sustainable growth policy of the previous owner-managers (primarily the Murphy family) with one of clearcutting.

==== Protests and resistance ====
On May 24, 1990, a bomb planted in the car of Earth First! activist Judi Bari exploded, sending her and fellow activist Darryl Cherney to the hospital. Judi and Darryl were on their way to a music and speaking event on the UC Santa Cruz campus, part of an organizing tour for Redwood Summer, which sought to inform the wider public about the tragedy unfolding in the Redwood Empire.

The explosion was a milestone of forest activism in the redwoods and elsewhere. The bomber was never identified. Oakland police and the FBI initially accused Bari and Cherney with transporting an explosive device under the driver's seat of her own car; but Alameda County prosecutors dropped the case for lack of evidence a few months later. A lawsuit filed by Judi against the FBI for violation of Constitutional rights was ultimately successful in 2002, vindicating Darryl and Judi, but coming five years after Judi's untimely death from breast cancer at the age of 47.

On September 17, 1998, David Chain, an Earth First! activist was struck by a falling tree while trying to stop logging in Pacific Lumber property. He was killed instantly and died of massive head trauma. In response to his death, a Pacific Lumber Co. spokesperson said their logging crew did not see anybody in the area and were unaware of Chain's presence. Earth First! said that the loggers had been deliberately felling huge trees, in a perpendicular manner rather than downhill, in the protesters' direction. One of the protesters also noted that the tree fellers were fully aware that they were there, as the activists had been "yelling at them, walking towards them, telling them 'Don't fell this tree'". On a videotape supplied by Earth First!, Arlington Earl Ammons, the 52-year-old logger responsible for felling the tree that caused Chain's death can be heard shouting expletives and threatening the protesters.

=== Beginning of a new millennium ===
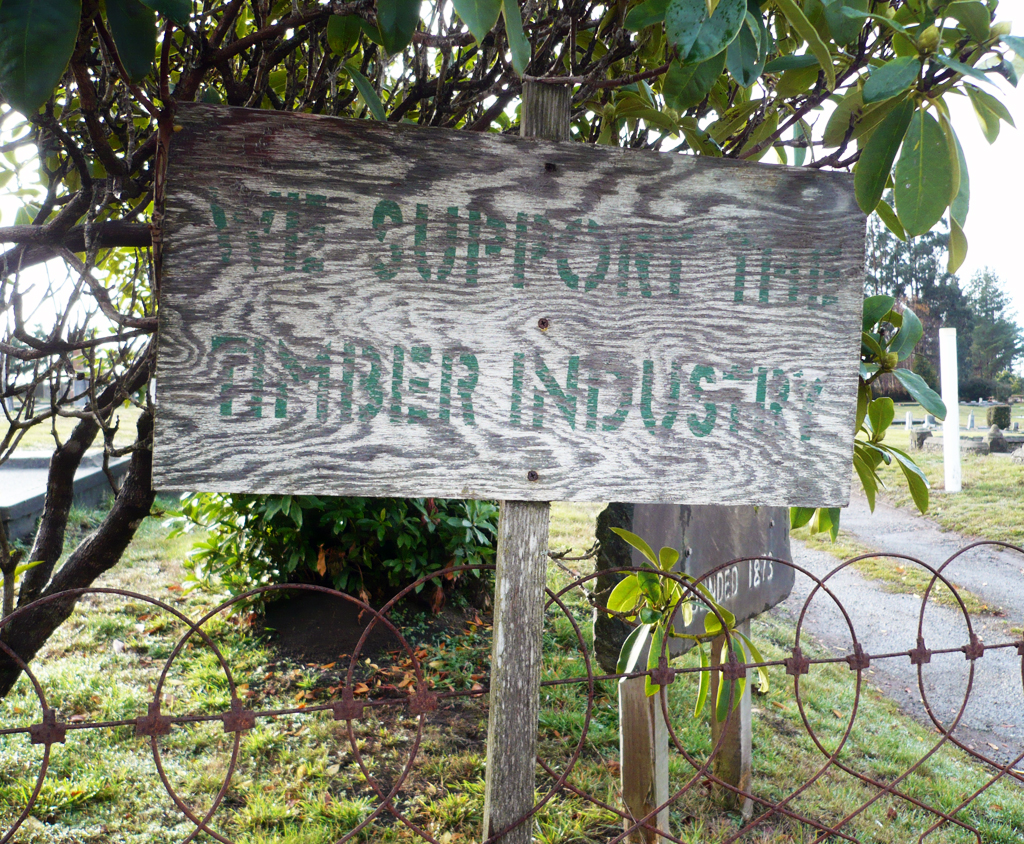
Locals painted signs to show their support for PALCO as the company declined.

The company filed for bankruptcy protection in January 2007. A Texas bankruptcy court considered reorganization options early in 2008. On June 6, 2008 the judge preliminarily decided to confirm the Mendocino Redwood Company option for reorganization and signed the order on July 8, 2008. The company's bond holders attempted to appeal, but on July 24, the appellate court in Louisiana refused to hear the case. Timber note holders stated that this will mean the Mendocino Redwood Company/ Marathon plan will be able to go forward, and many agree that any future court will be unlikely to undo it.

== Railroads ==
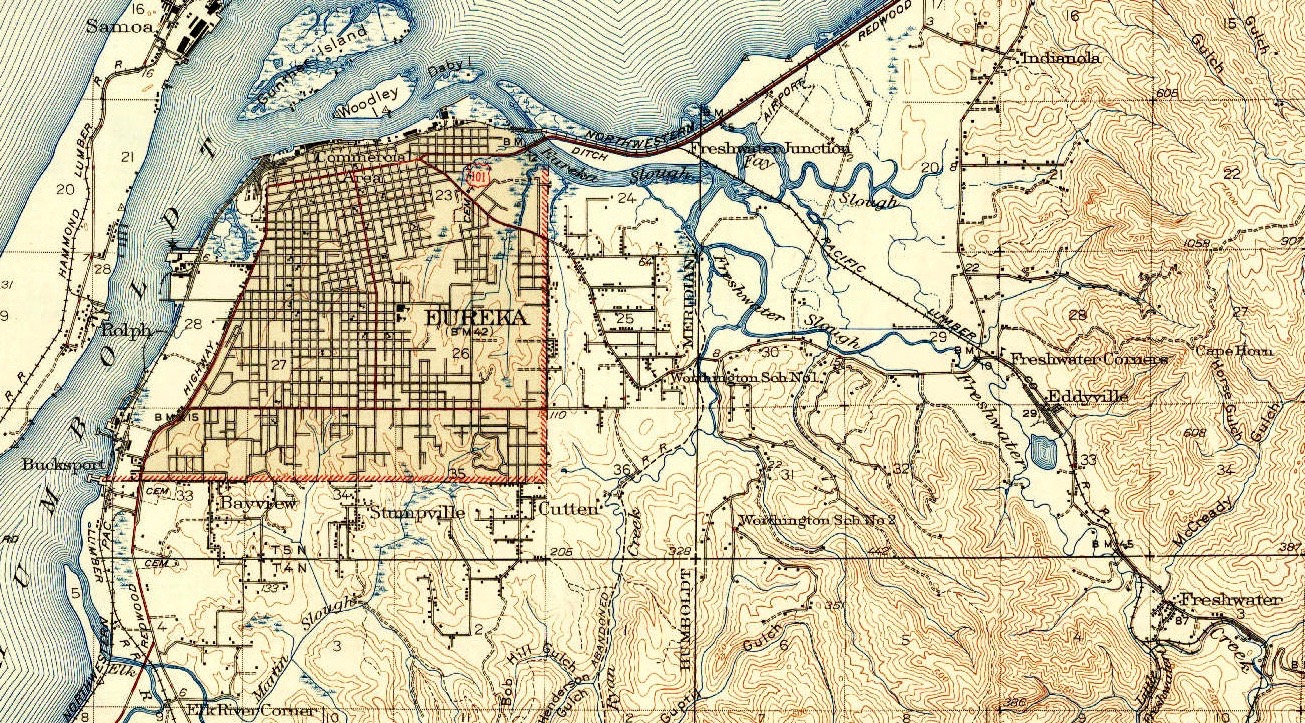
In 1942 Pacific Lumber Company operated a branch line off the Northwestern Pacific Railroad north of Eureka.

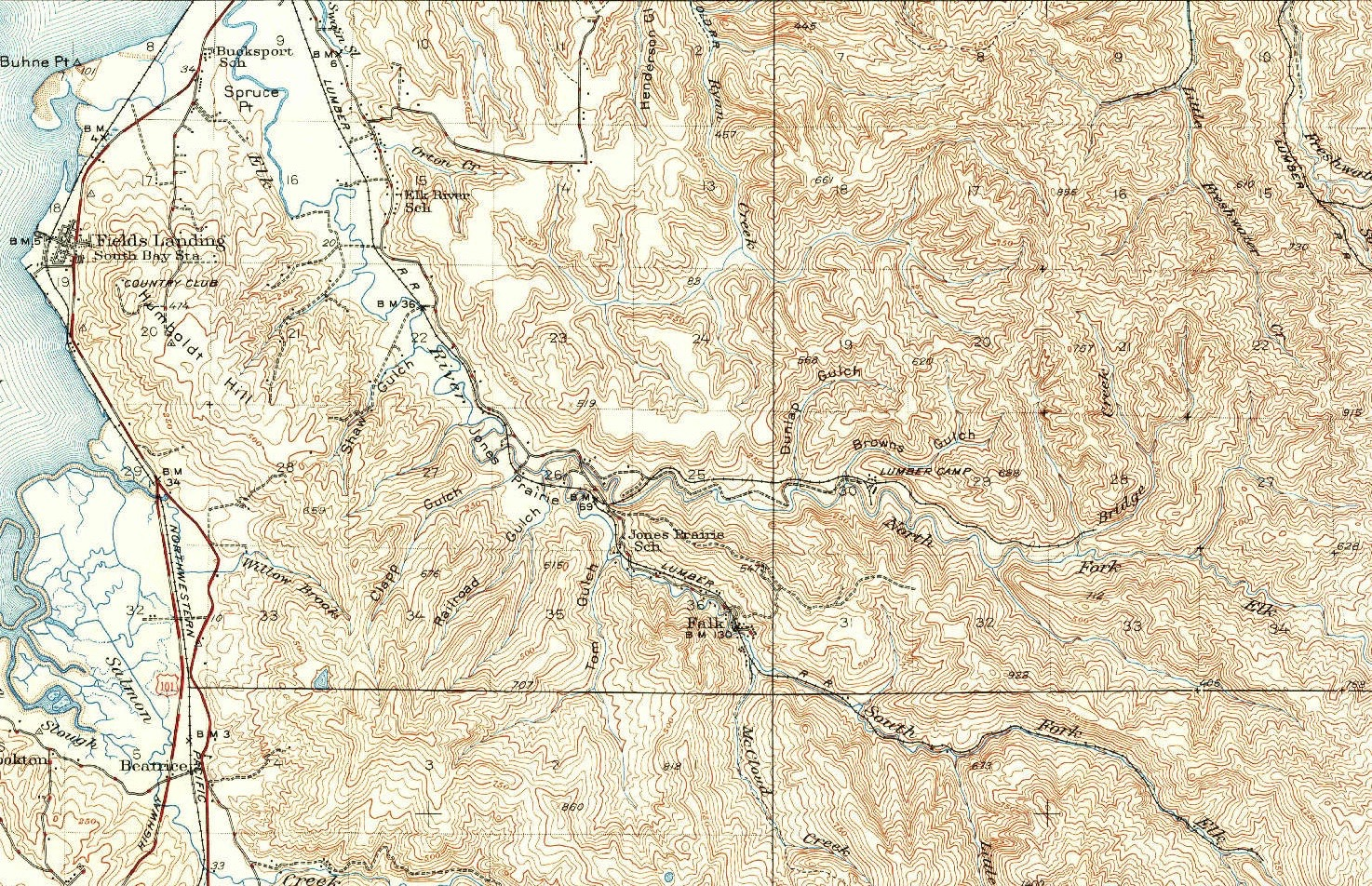
The former Bucksport and Elk River Railroad along Elk River Slough was operated by Pacific Lumber Company from 1950 to 1953.

Pacific Lumber Company incorporated the Humboldt Bay and Eel River Railroad on 17 November 1882 to transport lumber from the Scotia sawmill to Humboldt Bay for loading aboard ships. The railway was completed across the Scotia Bluffs to Alton, California on 20 August 1885 where connection was made with the Eel River and Eureka Railroad for the remainder of the distance to Humboldt Bay. Rails were extended southward up the Eel River from Scotia to bring logs into the sawmill. Atchison, Topeka and Santa Fe Railway merged the Pacific Lumber Company railway into their subsidiary San Francisco and Northwestern Railway on 15 May 1903, although Pacific Lumber Company retained the land underlying the right of way along with the timber rights and the ability to use the line for their logging operations. The railway became part of the Northwestern Pacific Railroad on 8 January 1907. Pacific Lumber Company built flatcars from wood and maintained a fleet of locomotives for moving logs from the woods into the mill and for switching cars for loading or unloading at the sawmill. Diesels replaced steam locomotives in 1955. Log trains of wooden flat cars ran to the Scotia mill until 1976 from a log deck in Carlotta, California. Company switchers were stationed at Scotia until Northwestern Pacific Railroad discontinued service.

=== Locomotives ===
Number	Builder	Type	Date	Works number	Notes
3	Pennsylvania Railroad	4-4-0	1886	1031	originally Pennsylvania Railroad #452; then Chicago, St. Louis and Pittsburgh Railroad #452; then Pittsburgh, Cincinnati, Chicago and St. Louis Railroad #8298; renumbered #298; renumbered #343; sold 1902 to Eel River and Eureka Railroad as #4
2nd # 3	Baldwin Locomotive Works	2-6-2	1922	55248	formerly Humboldt Northern Railroad #3 purchased 1950; sold 1953
9	Heisler Locomotive Works	2-truck Heisler locomotive	1920	1446	originally Mount Tamalpais and Muir Woods Railway #9; then Siskiyou Lumber Co. of Macdoel, CA; then Humboldt Northern Railroad #5; purchased 1950; retired 1953 and placed on display in Scotia.
19	Baldwin Locomotive Works	0-6-0 Tank locomotive	1875	3739	purchased from Excelsior Redwood Company
20	Marshutz & Cantrell	0-6-0 Tank locomotive	1882		purchased from Excelsior Redwood Company
21	Rogers Locomotive and Machine Works	4-4-0	1881		
22	Baldwin Locomotive Works	2-4-2 Tank locomotive	1887	8792	purchased as #2; renumbered
23	Baldwin Locomotive Works	2-4-2 Tank locomotive	1886	8007	purchased as #1; renumbered; wrecked in 1938
25	Baldwin Locomotive Works	2-4-2 Tank locomotive	June 1904	24317	purchased as #5; renumbered; sold to Holmes-Eureka Lumber Company
26	Lima Locomotive Works	2-truck Shay locomotive	14 July 1906	1615	purchased new; scrapped 1950
27	Baldwin Locomotive Works	2-6-2	1909	33339	purchased new; scrapped 1955
28	Lima Locomotive Works	2-truck Shay locomotive	24 February 1910	2268	purchased new; sold to Pelican Bay Lumber Company Algoma, Oregon
29	Baldwin Locomotive Works	2-6-2	1910	34484	purchased new as a wood-burner; later converted to oil fuel; in 1986 placed on display in Eureka, California
30	Baldwin Locomotive Works	2-6-2	1911	36173	purchased new; scrapped 1955
31	Lima Locomotive Works	3-truck Shay locomotive	6 April 1911	2419	formerly California Western Railroad #10 purchased 1917; sold 1920
32	H.K. Porter, Inc.	0-6-0	1920	6533	fireless sawmill switcher with steam reservoir periodically refilled from the sawmill boiler; sold 1921
33	Climax Locomotive Works	3-truck Climax locomotive	1923	1633	original locomotive c/n 1592 built in 1921 was returned to builder and replaced; scrapped 1952
34	Baldwin Locomotive Works	2-6-0	1913	39760	purchased 1921 from Ocean Shore Railroad; sold 1942 to Red River Lumber Company Westwood, California
35	Baldwin Locomotive Works	2-8-2	October 1923	67538	purchased new; retired 1966; sold 1971 Now on static display at the Nevada Southern Railroad Museum in Boulder City, Nevada.
36	Lima Locomotive Works	2-truck Shay locomotive	3 May 1907	1836	formerly Metropolitan Redwood Lumber Company #1; purchased October 1935; scrapped 1953
37	American Locomotive Company	2-8-2 Tank locomotive	1924	660333	purchased 1935 from Sugar Pine Lumber Company; sold 1966 Last operated at the Wilmington Western railroad from 1987-1990. Was stored at Strasburg Railroad until Age of Steam Roundhouse acquired the locomotive.
38	Climax Locomotive Works	2-truck Climax locomotive	1922	1621	purchased 1938 from Holmes-Eureka Lumber Company; sold 1956
101	GE Transportation Systems	GE 80-ton switcher	1956	32395	purchased new, retired 1992; sold 1996
102	GE Transportation Systems	GE 80-ton switcher	1956	32413	purchased new, retired 1992; sold 1996
103	GE Transportation Systems	GE 80-ton switcher	1957	32414	purchased new, sold 1980
104	Baldwin Locomotive Works	Baldwin VO-1000	1945	71740	purchased 1962 from United States Army Transportation Corps; sold 1981
105	Baldwin Locomotive Works	Baldwin VO-1000	1945	71985	purchased 1964 from United States Navy; sold 1981

== Environmental issues ==
Under pressure from environmental activists, the company considered selling 6,000 acres (24 km²) of mostly old growth redwoods for $300 million to protect the marbled murrelet, spotted owl, and other old growth dwellers. As required by regulatory authorities, buffer zones have been further developed around rivers to prevent erosion and maintain animal habitats, but the Eel River, the region's major waterway, has been considerably damaged as a result of more than 150 years of logging activity, not all of which is the result of PALCO operations. In 1999 PALCO agreed to American activist Julia Butterfly Hill's requests to create a 3-acre (12,000 m^{2}) buffer zone around a 600-year old-growth redwood named Luna in exchange for leaving the tree, as she had been living in it for just over two years. Though someone vandalized the tree during the process, it survives to the present.

In 2003, the Company was sued civilly, by the District Attorney of Humboldt County, for fraud and violations of the California Business and Professions Code. The suit was predicated on the allegation that PALCO had affirmatively represented that its timber operations would have a similar environmental impact across all of its land holdings, when in fact there were wide variances and effects on differing watershed environments. The suit was ultimately dismissed by a California Superior Court Judge, but was later appealed to the California Court of Appeal. In January 2008, the California court of Appeal for the 1st district upheld the trial court's dismissal of the litigation, and the suit is for all practical purposes over. During the pendency of this litigation MAXXAM filed for Bankruptcy. Reports indicate that the family that owns the GAP Stores who are already investors in timber lands in Mendocino county, just south of Humboldt county have submitted a proposal to take over PALCO to the Bankruptcy court in Corpus Christi, TX. Environmentalists hailed the move as being a vast improvement on the increased logging approach by Charles Hurwitz and MAXXAM.
