= John A. Campbell (lumber executive) =

American politician

John Aloysius Campbell (June 20, 1941 – October 19, 2008) was a timber executive, who served as president of the Pacific Lumber Company in the 1990s, politician and the mayor of Fortuna.

== Early life ==
Campbell was born on June 20, 1941, in Leura, New South Wales, outside of Sydney, Australia. His father was a recreational sailor who helped American ships navigate near the Great Barrier Reef, as part of assistance he provided to the United States Navy during World War II.

He obtained his early education in a one-room schoolhouse and later attended North Sydney Technical Collegeas well as Sydney Technical Institution for Wildlife Research.

== Travels ==
Campbell won a national life-saving competition and was an experienced surfer. After service in the Australian Army, his world travels included journeys to England, where he surfed off the coast of Cornwall, and was said by his son as having introduced the sport to the area.

He traveled on to New York City, working at the Australian consulate there. He met his future wife Cynthia Carpenter in San Francisco, California, in 1966.

== High-ranking executive ==
Campbell was hired by Ed Carpenter, one-time company president and Campbell's then father-in-law, to work the green chain sawmill. In time and through changes in administration he worked his way up the ranks to executive vice president in charge of forest products, by 1985; he was named as the firm's president after the company was the subject of a hostile takeover by Charles Hurwitz. Campbell was named chief executive in 1993.

In order to pay off the costs associated with the $900 million purchase of the company, Pacific Lumber increased the pace of cutting on the more than 300 square miles (780 km^{2}) of timber it owned which included clusters of old-growth California redwoods. This more aggressive logging incurred the opposition of environmental groups, which staged protests aimed at stopping Pacific Lumber's logging efforts.

In 1999, Pacific Lumber's parent, Maxxam Inc., signed the Headwaters agreement, in which Pacific Lumber sold 10,000 acres (40 km^{2}) to the federal government and the State of California for $480 million, and the firm agreed to stricter environmental restrictions on logging on its remaining land.

In October 2001, Pacific Lumber named Robert E. Manne as president and CEO, replacing Campbell, who became chairman of the firm's board of directors.

== Personal life ==
Campbell divorced his first wife, and was survived by his wife of 18 years, Margaret R. Campbell, whom he had married in 1991. He died of cancer on October 19, 2008, in his home in Fortuna, California.

He was elected to the Fortuna city council in 2006 and was selected by his fellow council members to serve as the city's mayor, a position he held until his death.
