= Eel River and Eureka Railroad =

Overview
- Headquarters: Eureka
- Locale: California's North Coast from Eureka - Alton, California
- Dates of operation: 1882–1902
- Successor: San Francisco and Northwestern Railway

Technical
- Track gauge: 4 ft 8 1/2 in (1,435 mm) standard gauge
- Previous gauge: 30 miles (48 km) of system originally,

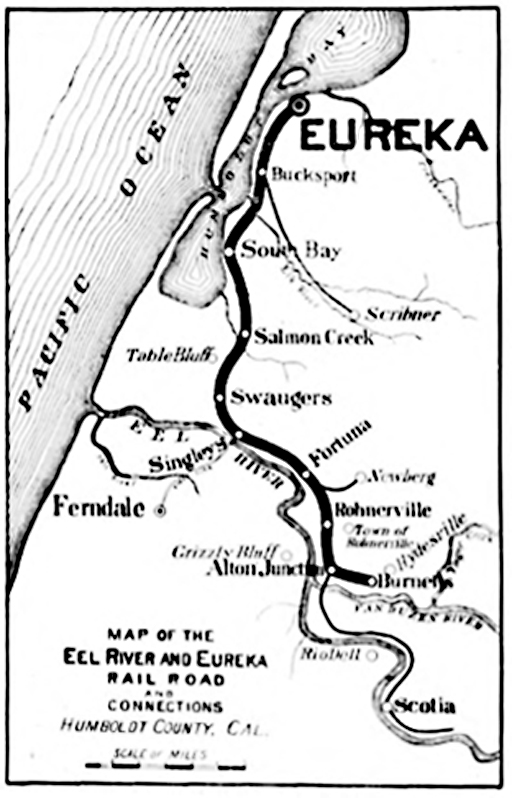
The Eel River and Eureka Railroad map of 1896 showing the line from Eureka to Burnell's station.

The Eel River and Eureka Railroad company was organized on November 14, 1882, by a group of Eureka businessmen led by John M. Vance (b. Nova Scotia October 1, 1821 – d. January 1892). One of the other founders of the line was William Carson.

== History ==
The primary 25 miles (40 km) of the Eel River and Eureka Railroad ran from the line's office and depot at the foot of Second Street, Eureka to Burnell's station, a town near Hydesville. The longest tunnel was nearly 2,000 feet (610 m) through Table Bluff between the stops of Salmon Creek and Swauger's Station.

By 1896, the Eel River and Eureka Railroad was running passenger trains twice a day, every day but Sunday when there were three trains. From June 1895 to June 1896, the line had 32,811 passengers who paid a total of $24,748.70 in fares. In the same period, the line earned $67,568.85 from lumber and freight, over 3,000 tons of which was butter from the Eel River Valley dairies.

After the junction at Alton the Pacific Lumber Company Railroad extended south about 4 miles (6.4 km) through and slightly beyond the town of Scotia.

In October 1902, all the property and rights of the Eel River and Eureka Railroad were transferred to the San Francisco and Northwestern Railway.

The tracks became part of a continuous line from San Francisco to Trinidad in the summer of 1914. On December 28, 1918, the San Francisco and Northwestern Railway transferred the assets to the Northwestern Pacific Railroad. The line was considered one of the toughest in the nation to build and maintain.

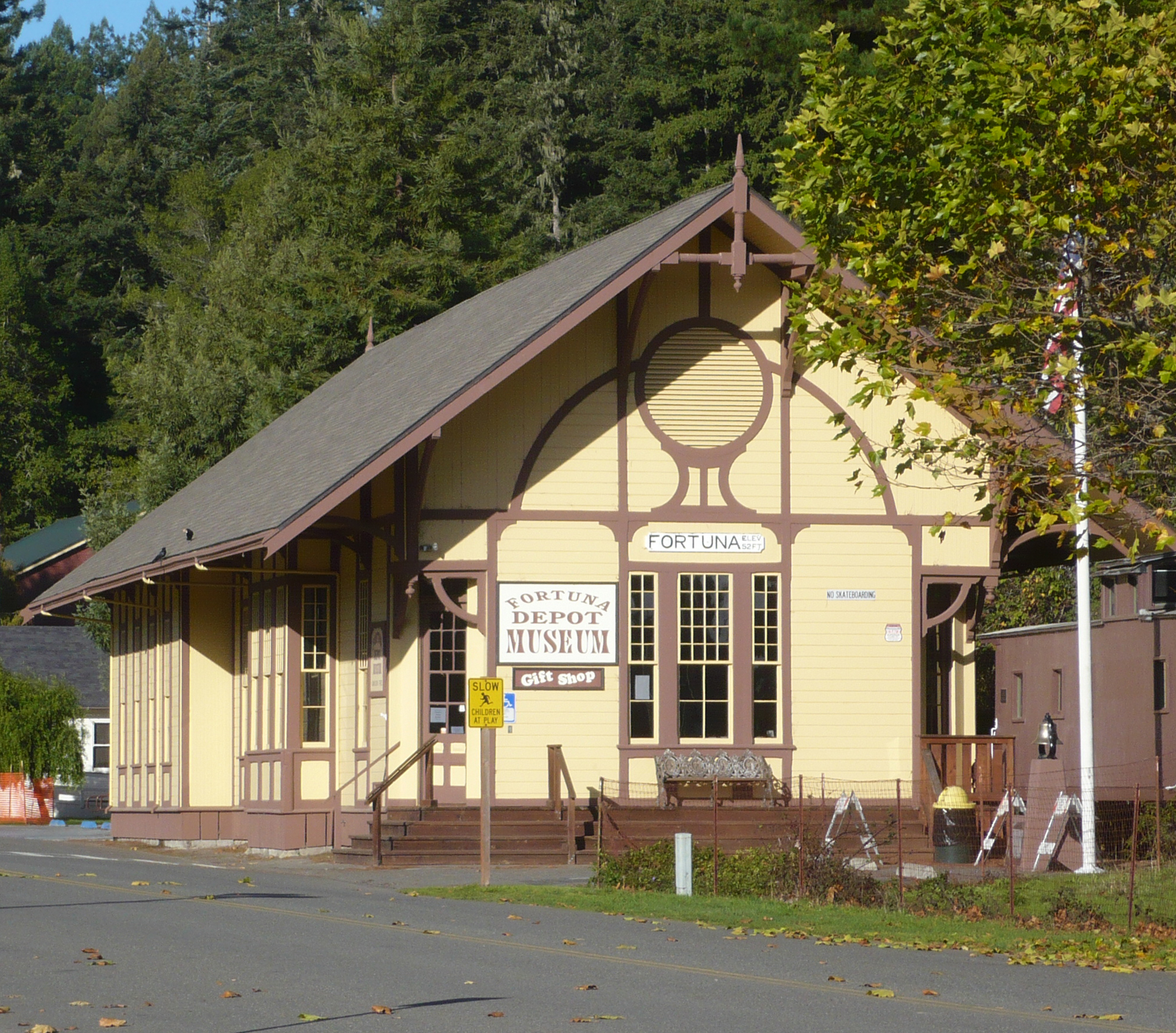

Depot buildings were added at all major stops. A roundhouse and depot were built in Eureka, California. The Eureka Depot building was torn down in January 1971 and two weeks later the roundhouse was also demolished. The Fortuna Depot building is now a historical museum.

== Additional reading ==
- Sean Mitchell, The Demise of The Northwestern Pacific Railroad, http://humboldt-dspace.calstate.edu/bitstream/handle/10211.3/131780/Mitchell_Sean_Barnum_f.pdf?sequence=1
