= San Francisco and Northwestern Railway =

Shortline railroads in Northern California from Humboldt Bay (1903-1907)

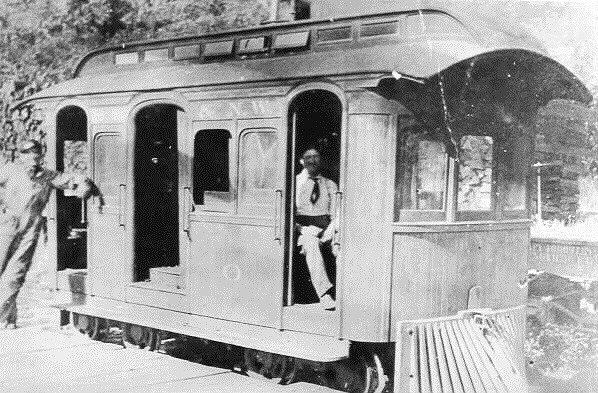
- San Francisco and Northwestern Railway steam dummy

Overview
- Locale: northern California, USA
- Dates of operation: 1903–1907
- Successor: Atchison, Topeka and Santa Fe Railway

Technical
- Track gauge: 4 ft 8 1/2 in (1,435 mm) standard gauge
- Length: 50 mi (80 km)

San Francisco and Northwestern Railway (SF&NW) was an Atchison, Topeka and Santa Fe Railway subsidiary formed in 1903 to connect Humboldt Bay to the Santa Fe rail system.

The Eel River and Eureka Railroad had been built in 1884 to provide Humboldt Bay shipping access to lumber mills and farms of the lower Eel River. Subsidiary California Midland Railroad was formed in 1902 to extend the line up the Van Duzen River to Carlotta.

In 1885, Pacific Lumber Company built a rail connection from their Scotia lumber mill to the Eel River and Eureka Railroad at Alton. Logging branches extended 8 miles up the Eel River by 1902.

The California and Northern Railway was formed in 1900 to build north from Eureka. Rails reached Arcata by 1903.

SF&NW acquired the Eel River and Eureka Railroad, its subsidiary California Midland, and the Pacific Lumber Company rail lines in 1903. Purchase of the California and Northern Railway in 1904 gave SF&NW a 50-mile (80 km) main line from Arcata to the Eel River upstream of Scotia. Santa Fe's distinctive circled cross herald appeared on the Eureka Depot.

Southern Pacific Railroad had simultaneously secured control of the logging lines north of Arcata through their subsidiary Oregon and Eureka Railroad. Both Santa Fe and Southern Pacific had ambitions of building their own connections to Humboldt County lumber mills; but SF&NW was merged into the jointly owned Northwestern Pacific Railroad in 1907.
