= Ronald Cathcart =

American banker and regulator

Ronald J. Cathcart
- Born: Montreal, Quebec
- Occupation: Banker
- Spouse: Leila Wihby-Cathcart

Ronald J. Cathcart (born 1952) is a Canadian-born American banking executive and financial regulator. He is Managing Director, Head of Risk Practice at Promontory Financial Group.

Cathcart is also a member of the U.S. Risk Committee of the board of directors of French corporate investment bank Natixis, and is a former U.S. representative to the Policy Development Group of the Basel Committee on Banking Supervision.

Cathcart was the Head of Enterprise Risk Supervision at the Federal Reserve Bank of New York and the Chief Enterprise Risk Officer at Washington Mutual. He has held risk management positions at the executive level at a number of other North American banks including the Canadian Imperial Bank of Commerce, Bank One, and the Royal Bank of Canada.

Cathcart was Washington Mutual's highest-ranking risk management officer in the run-up to the 2008 financial crisis. His tenure was notable for his efforts to reduce sub-prime loan origination and tighten underwriting standards at the bank as market conditions deteriorated. In early 2008, Cathcart was terminated by Chairman and CEO Kerry Killinger after escalating concerns about weak controls and rising losses to the bank's board of directors and regulators. He later was a key witness testifying under oath during US Senate Subcommittee hearings examining causes and consequences of the 2008 financial crisis.

== Early life and education ==
Cathcart was born in Montreal, Quebec and lived his early life in its Westmount neighborhood. He is one of three children of Thomas and Margaret (née Thomson) Cathcart, who were of Scottish ancestry.

He attended prep school at Bishop's College School in Sherbrooke, Quebec before graduating from St Bees School in Cumbria, England with A-Levels in English and Physics. In 1974, he graduated with an AB in English from Dartmouth College, where he was a member of The Dartmouth Aires. Cathcart also obtained an MBA from the Ivey Business School at Western University in London, Ontario.

== Career ==
=== Early career ===
Cathcart entered the banking industry in 1982, joining the Royal Bank of Canada and rotating through placements in Toronto, Vancouver, and Europe. After 17 years managing risk at RBC, Cathcart immigrated to the United States to work for Jamie Dimon as EVP, Chief Risk Officer Retail at Bank One in Chicago.

In 2002, Cathcart joined CIBC as EVP, Retail Risk Management where he oversaw the bank's $120 billion consumer-lending portfolio.

=== Move to Washington Mutual ===
In December 2005, Cathcart left CIBC to join Washington Mutual as its Chief Enterprise Risk Officer, reporting to Chairman and CEO Kerry Killinger as the bank's most senior risk officer. On arrival, Cathcart inherited a risk department that was isolated from the rest of the business and struggling to be effective. Under Washington Mutual's reporting structure, Chief Risk Officers for business units reported both into Enterprise Risk Management as well as into their business line's heads. This system, referred to within the bank as "Double-Double", subordinated risk management to the achievement of growth objectives in performance reviews of Chief Risk Officers for individual business units.

During his tenure, Cathcart expressed concern that risk issues were not being properly reported, including major problems at sub-prime loan origination subsidiary Long Beach. As market conditions worsened in 2006 and 2007, Cathcart took steps to tighten standards and surface risk concerns to senior management at the bank. In 2007, Cathcart was chastised on several occasions for interjecting during board presentations to correct overly optimistic loss figures. By the end of 2007, Cathcart was no longer being invited to board meetings. In early 2008, Cathcart discovered that Killinger had provided John Reich, the Director of the Office of Thrift Supervision, with out-of-date loss rates. Cathcart moved unilaterally to provide the regulator with correct numbers, which upset Killinger.

In February 2008, Cathcart initiated a meeting with a director on the board where he advised the director that he was being marginalized by senior management to the point that he was no longer able to discharge his responsibilities as Chief Enterprise Risk Officer. By April 2008, Cathcart had been terminated by Killinger.

Killinger was removed as chairman two months later and was forced out of the CEO position in September 2008. A week later, a run on the bank occurred following the collapse of Lehman Brothers and the bank was seized by the OTS and sold to JPMorgan Chase.

Subsequent to his time at Washington Mutual, Cathcart founded and was CEO of Columbia Capital Consulting Group, a firm providing real estate consulting and risk management advisory services in the US.

In April 2010, Cathcart testified in a three hour hearing conducted by the Permanent Subcommittee on Investigations of the United States Senate under Chairman Carl Levin, D-MI, and Ranking Member Tom Coburn, R-OK.

=== Career in financial regulation ===
In January 2012, Cathcart joined the Federal Reserve Bank of New York as Head of Credit, responsible for the assessment of credit risk at institutions under the bank's supervision. In 2013, Cathcart was appointed as the US designate to the Policy Development Group of the Basel Committee on Banking Supervision, where he contributed to the development of the Basel III framework.

Cathcart was promoted to Head of Enterprise Risk Supervision in March 2014, and was made responsible for the oversight of risks faced by financial institutions including systemically important firms designated by the Financial Stability Oversight Council, large foreign financial institutions, and large regional banking organizations.

Cathcart left the New York Fed in 2017 for Promontory Financial Group, where he leads the consultancy's Risk Management and Regulatory practice.
