= Joseph Saunders (chief executive) =

Joseph W. Saunders (born c. 1945, died 3rd November, 2026) was the executive chairman and former CEO of the multibillion-dollar global payments technology company Visa Inc., appointed in 2007.

== Early life ==
He graduated as a brother of Lambda Chi Alpha from the University of Denver where he acquired a B.S. in business administration and an MBA.

== Career ==
Saunders was president and CEO of Providian from November 2001, and chairman of the board from May 2002 until 2005.

He was president of card services for Washington Mutual, Inc. after acquiring Providian Financial Corporation in October 2005. until Washington Mutual’s Purchasing of Providian in 2005. From 1997 until 2001, Saunders was chairman and CEO of Fleet Credit Card Services. After leaving Visa, he became the head of Green Visor Capital, a new fintech venture capital fund.

Saunders was a member of the board of Visa USA from October 2002 to February 2007 and as a member of the board for Visa International from October 2005 to February 2007.

== Philanthropy ==
He was chairman of the board for Teach For All beginning in September 2009.

Saunders and his wife Sharon donated $5 million to the University of Denver in 2018 to establish the Saunders Leadership Academy.
