= Death of David Chain =

American environment activist (1974–1998)

David Nathan "Gypsy" Chain (June 17, 1974 – September 17, 1998) was an environmental activist. He was killed by a falling tree in suspicious circumstances during a protest in California Redwood Forests against the Pacific Lumber Company.

== Background ==
Chain was a member of the Earth First! environmental advocacy group and was engaged in a campaign of tree sitting in order to stop what they considered was illegal logging, in breach of California Forest Practices Act, in the Headwaters Forest, 350 miles (560 km) north of San Francisco, near Grizzly Creek Redwoods State Park. Headwaters was the largest private holding of old-growth forest in the world. Following a hostile takeover of Pacific Lumber Co., the Murphy family (the largest minority stock holders at the time) and countless previous stockholders, mostly company employees, were relieved of their stock by Charles Hurwitz and his Maxxam, Inc. corporation of Texas. Between a desire to turn a higher profit and the need to start paying off the debt incurred from acquiring the company, Hurwitz's Maxxam replaced the sustainable growth policy of the previous owner-managers with one of clearcutting. The new practices led to the so-called Redwood Summer campaign by environmentalists, and ultimately forced the 140-year-old company to declare bankruptcy.

Many residents of the area made their living through logging. On the one hand, some members of the community in the nearby mill town of Fortuna strongly resented the presence of activists from other areas, as these were not aware of the potential economic impacts of logging stoppages. On the other hand, environmental activists like Chain believed that clearcutting was not sustainable and highlighted that the choice of jobs or the environment was a fallacy.

== Circumstances of his death ==
According to Humboldt County Sheriff Department, Chain was struck by a falling tree while trying to stop logging. He was killed instantly and died of massive head trauma. In response to his death, a Pacific Lumber Co. spokesperson said their logging crew did not see anybody in the area and were unaware of Chain's presence. Earth First! said that the loggers had been deliberately felling huge trees, in a perpendicular manner rather than downhill, in the protesters' direction. One of the protesters also noted that the tree fellers were fully aware that they were there, as the activists had been "yelling at them, walking towards them, telling them 'Don't fell this tree'". On a videotape supplied by Earth First!, Arlington Earl Ammons, the 52-year-old logger responsible for falling the tree that caused Chain's death can be heard shouting expletives and threatening the protesters.

Based on the local sheriff's probe, Humboldt County district attorney Terry Farmer decided not to press charges, concluding Ammons had not knowingly aimed a tree at any of the protesters.

=== Civil suit and settlement ===
Following the reticence of the district attorney to file criminal charges, Chain's mother started a civil suit against Ammons, Pacific Lumber and its parent company, Maxxam, alleging they were reckless and responsible for the death of her son.

A wrongful death settlement was reached three days before trial was scheduled to commence. Its financial terms remain undisclosed but other parts were made public, as a reminder of the tragedy, the 135-foot tree (41 m) that struck Chain will remain where it fell, and a 100-foot buffer zone (30 m) prevented any nearby logging. A memorial was also erected.

== Consequences ==
Soon after Chain's death, it was revealed that the California Department of Forestry & Fire Protection had charged Pacific Lumber with at least 250 violations of the California Forest Practice Act between 1995 and 1997. These violations continued to accumulate in 1998, and in November of that year, Pacific Lumber became the first company ever to lose its logging license in California.

As a condition of reinstating their license, Pacific Lumber agreed to the creation of the Headwaters Forest Reserve. It received $380 million of public funds in return for the purchase. A Habitat Conservation Plan (HCP) was also developed and approved to allow limited logging on the remaining 211,000 acres (850 km^{2}) of Pacific Lumber Company timberland.

== Memorial scholarship ==
A memorial scholarship for high school seniors and first-year university students has been set up in Chain's name. It is intended to support students with a demonstrated passion in environmental conservation.

== In popular culture ==
Local Humboldt County based songwriters Karrie Jesse Manzanita Wallace & Juli Palmer wrote a song for him titled "A Chainsaw For A Gun (For Gypsy)" (c)1998

Singer-songwriter David Rovics dedicated a song to him, titled The Death of David Chain.

Seattle singer/songwriter Jim Page also wrote a song about David Chain entitled "Gypsy".

Writer John Burnside wrote a poem called "Earth" in memory of David Chain.

== See also ==
- Judi Bari
- Earth First!
