= Falk Archaeological District =

- U.S. National Register of Historic Places
- U.S. Historic district
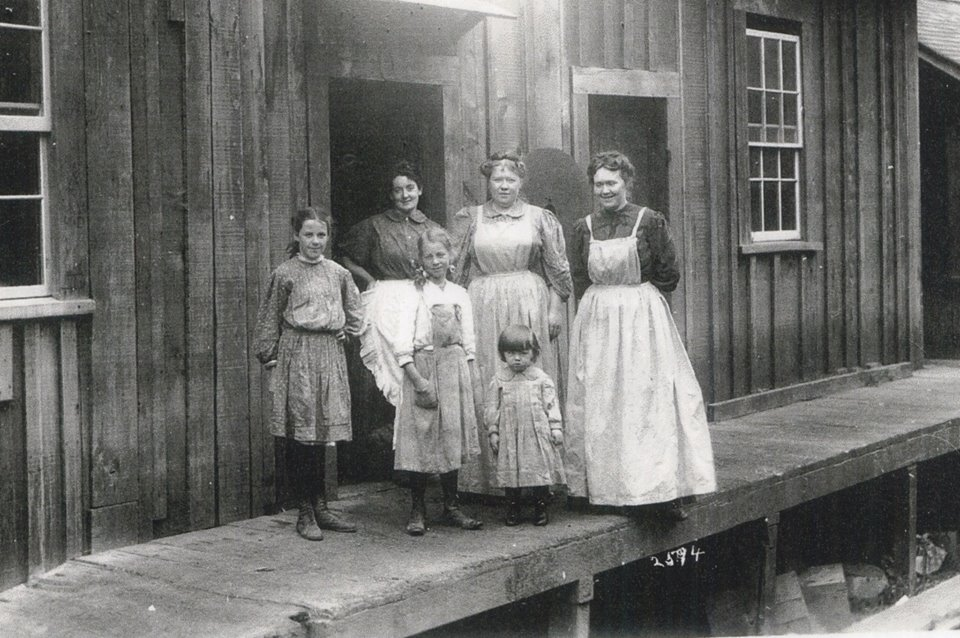
- Residents of the town of Falk
- Location: Headwaters Forest Reserve, Humboldt County, California, United States
- Coordinates: 40°41′22.1″N 124°7′50.94″W
- Built: 1884
- NRHP reference No.: 100009504

Significant dates
- Added to NRHP: November 9, 2023
- Designated HD: HD

The Falk Archaeological District encompasses a historic town and lumber mill site in Northern California, United States. Included in the Headwaters Forest Reserve in 1999, the town was founded by Noah and Elijah Falk. The site was listed on the National Register of Historic Places in 2023.

== History ==
Noah Falk came to California in 1854 and formed the Elk River Mill and Lumber Company with two partners. The town was built around the sawmill in 1884 to house the families of immigrant lumberjacks from Sweden, Norway, Ireland and Nova Scotia.Workers toiled deep in the now-protected redwood stands, felling trees, shipping them on Falk’s very own railroad to the mill, and finally sending the lumber to worldwide markets via a port at present day Eureka. The town of 400 with a cookhouse, a dance hall, a general store, a post office and a school thrived until 1937 when the Great Depression closed the lumber mill and the town was soon abandoned. Among the last residents were Charlie Webb and his wife who acted as property caretakers for the lumber company. After Charlie died, the lumber company burned and demolished the buildings in 1979 due to liability concerns and a plaque stands in its place.

== Description ==
Remnants of the townsite are visible and marked with interpretive signs along the first half-mile of the Elk River Trail. The restored locomotive barn serves as an education center.

== Elk River Mill & Lumber Co. 1 Falk ==
Elk River Mill & Lumber Co. 1 Falk
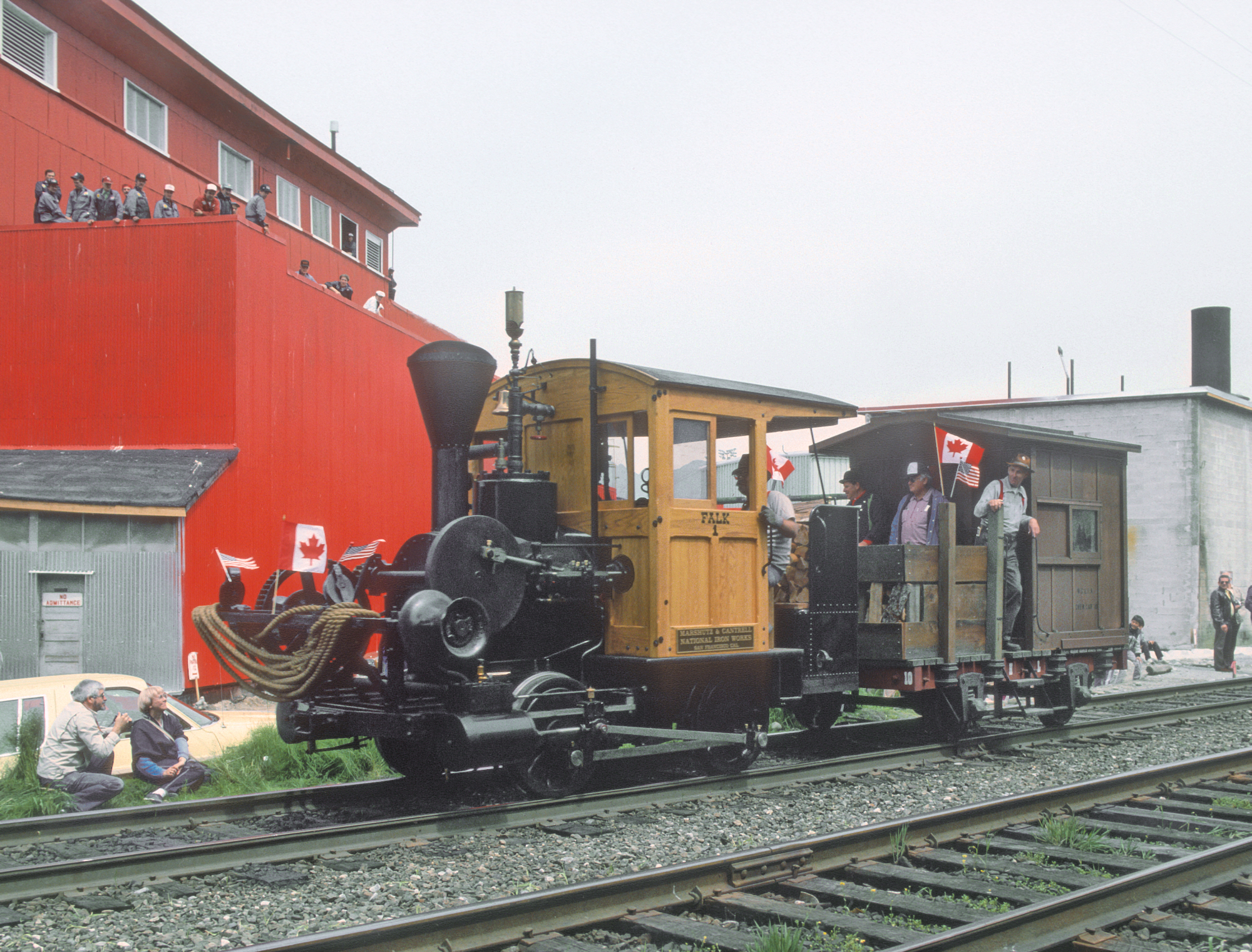
Type and origin
- Power type: Steam
- Builder: Marshutz and Centrell
- Build date: 1884
- Total produced: 1
Specifications
- Configuration
  - Whyte: 0-4-0
- Gauge: 1,435 mm (4 ft 8 1/2 in)
- Driver dia.: 33 in (0.838 m)
- Adhesive weight: 33 drivers
- Loco weight: 18,000 lbs
- Fuel type: Wood
- Cylinders: Two, outside
- Cylinder size: 9 in × 12 in (230 mm × 300 mm)
Career
- Official name: Falk
- Retired: 1927
- Disposition: Operational

Elk River Mill & Lumber Co. "Falk" No.1 is a 0-4-0 steam locomotive built by Marshutz and Centrell in 1884. This "gypsy" type locomotive was purchased by Noah Falk in San Francisco and shipped by vessel to Arcata, CA. It was first used at the Dolly Varden Mill in north Arcata until the mill was closed in 1885. In 1886, it was moved to Falk for use on the Elk River Mill & Lumber Co. railroad. Logs were hauled from the woods to the mill. When the railroad was extended five miles up a narrow, winding canyon, a larger locomotive was purchased in 1903. The Falk was relegated to switching duties at the mill. In 1927 it was retired. The locomotive was given to the city of Eureka, California, for use in a 1936 Fourth of July parade operating on streetcar tracks.

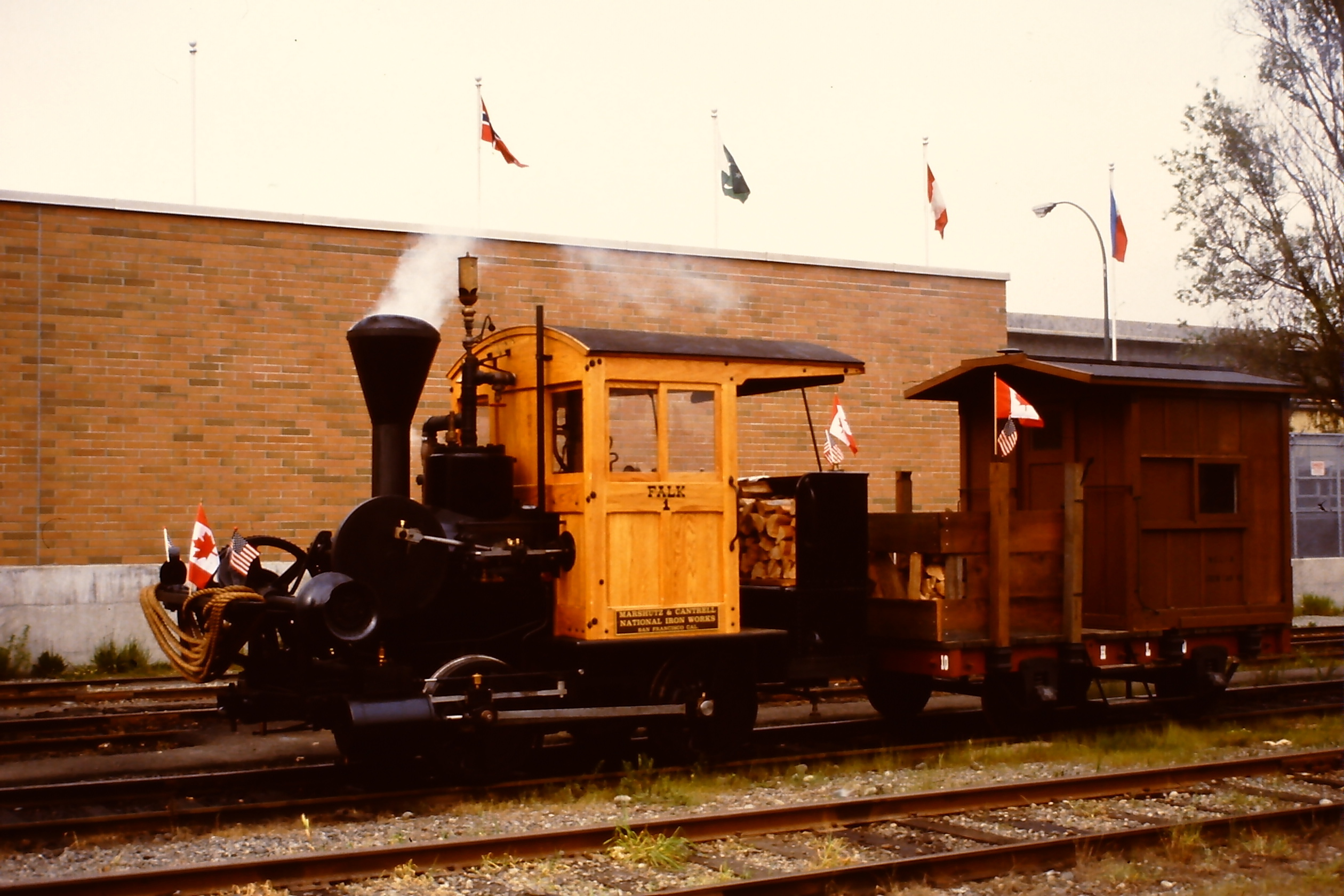
Falk 1 (SteamExpo 86)

In May 1986, the engine participated at SteamExpo 86 in Vancouver, British Columbia. The engine participated at Railfair 1999. As of 2024, The Falk is still operational.
