= Alan H. Fishman =

American businessman

- Born: 16 March 1946 (age 79); United States
- Occupation: Businessman
- Known for: Washington Mutual's last weeks

Alan H. Fishman (born 16 March 1946) is an American businessman. He was the last CEO of Washington Mutual (WaMu) prior to federal regulators seizing its assets on September 25, 2008.

== Education and career ==
Fishman holds a bachelor's degree from Brown University and a master's degree in economics from Columbia University. He was president and chief operating officer of Sovereign Bank and president and chief executive officer of Independence Community Bank. He began work at Meridian Capital Group in 2007. He was a private equity investor, focusing on financial services at Neuberger & Berman, Adler & Shaykin and at his own firm Columbia Financial Partners. He held senior executive positions at Chemical Bank and ContiFinancial Corporation.

Fishman was Chairman of the Board of Trustees of Brooklyn Academy of Music, on which he served for nearly 30 years, until January 2017.

== Washington Mutual ==
Fishman joined WaMu on September 8, 2008, replacing outgoing CEO Kerry Killinger as part of that bank's restructuring in the face of the subprime mortgage crisis. He served as the bank's CEO for 17 days before its banking assets were seized by federal regulators in the largest bank failure in American history. WaMu's banking operations were sold to JPMorgan Chase for $1.9 billion, while the remainder of WaMu declared bankruptcy the next day. According to C-Span on September 26, he was ultimately paid $19 million for three weeks of work at WaMu, including severance pay. Meanwhile, the company's stock price dwindled to pennies after trading as high as $45 a share in 2007. The previous CEO was paid $14 million for one year on the job.
