= Charles Hurwitz =

American businessman and financier

Charles Edwin Hurwitz
- Born: 1940 (age 85–86); Kilgore, Texas, U.S.
- Education: Oklahoma University
- Employer(s): United Savings Association of Texas, Federated Development, Maxxam, Inc., Pacific Lumber Company, Kaiser Aluminum Corporation
- Spouse: Barbara Raye Gollub
- Children: 2
- Website: https://www.charleshurwitz.com/

Charles Edwin Hurwitz (born 1940) is an American businessman and financier known for his role in the 1980s savings and loan crisis, and his takeover of Pacific Lumber Company, a logging company active in Humboldt County, California.

His other holdings have included Kaiser Aluminum Corporation, a pari-mutual racing facilities in Texas, real estate developments throughout the Southwest and the Ozark Mountains in Arkansas; retail store complexes in western New York; a golf resort in Florida and a hotel-condominium resort and 1,300 acres developed in Puerto Rico. In 1988, his company Federated Development built a $75-million resort hotel in Rancho Mirage, California, overcoming opposition from residents, including Frank Sinatra.

== Early life and education ==
Charles Edwin Hurwitz was born in 1940, and raised in Kilgore, Texas. His parents were Eva (née Engler) and Hyman Hurwitz, and his father was Jewish and owned a local clothing store, "Hurwitz Man's Shop" and he built the town's first shopping center. Hurwitz attended Oklahoma University, graduating in 1962 with a degree in marketing. From 1962 until 1964, he served in the United States Army.

Starting in 1965, he worked at Bache and Company, as a stockbroker, and by age 27 he was the manager of a $54 million dollar hedge fund.

== Career ==
Hurwitz has had a reputation as a "corporate raider" with excessive corporate takeovers and mergers, as well as a lot of litigation. He added Kaiser Aluminum to his holdings by 1988. Other companies associated with Hurwitz include McCulloch Oil which became MCO Holdings, and Sam Houston Race Park. Hurwitz has real estate developments throughout the Southwestern United States, Arkansas' Ozark Mountains, retail in Western New York, golf resort in Florida, a resort and undeveloped land in Puerto Rico.

=== United Savings Association of Texas ===
Hurwitz gained control of the United Savings Association of Texas, the largest savings and loan in the state, in 1982.

In July 1995, Hurwitz was sued by the FDIC in connection with the failure of the United Savings Association of Texas and the risky dealings. Hurwitz alleged he was not in a position to have operating power at the United Savings Association of Texas, and he was not personally responsible for the 1988 collapse of the company which cost taxpayers $1.6 billion dollars. Hurwitz also alleged this FDIC suit was motivated by the government's desire to gain control of the Headwaters Forest Reserve. Ultimately in 2005, United States District Judge Lynn Hughes ruled in Hurwitz's favor, and ordered the agency to pay, "for its betrayal of the public trust, its vindictive political assault on a private citizen" - $72.3 million dollars in attorneys fees. This case had been closely watched by the steel workers union, who were suspect of Hurwitz on the collapse of the Kaiser Aluminum Corporation, a Maxxam, Inc. subsidiary company.

In January 2006, Hurwitz was investigated by John Doolittle, and Richard W. Pombo, two members of the U.S. House of Representatives' House Resources Committee, alongside the former member Tom DeLay. They subpoenad the FDIC confidential records on the case, which was later eventually dropped. It was not typical for politicians to hold similar investigations or subpoena the confidential records. By 2007, John Doolittle and his wife Julie were being investigated for their inappropriate role in the Jack Abramoff Indian lobbying scandal.

=== Federated Development ===
Hurwitz's company Federated Development built the 238-room Ritz-Carlton Rancho Mirage on 105 acres in Rancho Mirage, California. In 1982, local residents including Frank Sinatra opposed the building and as a result, Federated Development donated 350 acres to the city as a wildlife corridor. One of the limited partners of the hotel deal included President Gerald Ford. By October 1984, opponents lost the court fight.

=== Pacific Lumber Company ===
Hurwitz took over Pacific Lumber Company in 1985. Pacific Lumber Company, a subsidiary of Maxxam, Inc. owned the largest grove of old-growth redwood trees in California, the Headwaters Grove (now known as the Headwaters Forest Reserve). Prior to their takeover by Hurwitz Pacific Lumber had logged sustainably with an eye towards long term profitability. After their acquisition the company's corporate strategy changed entirely with an emphasis placed on maximizing annual profits. Clearcutting of redwood groves angered conservationists, activists, and the public; and led to a California bond issue to release funds to purchase the redwood forest for preservation. The environmental organization Earth First! offered a $50,000 reward for "information leading to the arrest, conviction, and jailing of corporate raider Charles Hurwitz."

== Personal life ==
Hurwitz married Barbara Raye Gollub in 1963 in Tulsa, her hometown. Together they had two sons. The eldest, Shawn Hurwitz (1965–2015), died at the age of 50, during a 2015 boating accident on Lake Austin. The family lived in Houston for more than 25 years, but also spending significant time in New York and Los Angeles for business.

Hurwitz shies away from publicity and rarely gives interviews.

== See also ==
- Earth First!
- Savings and loan crisis
