= Headwaters Forest Reserve =

Coast redwood groves near Humboldt Bay, California

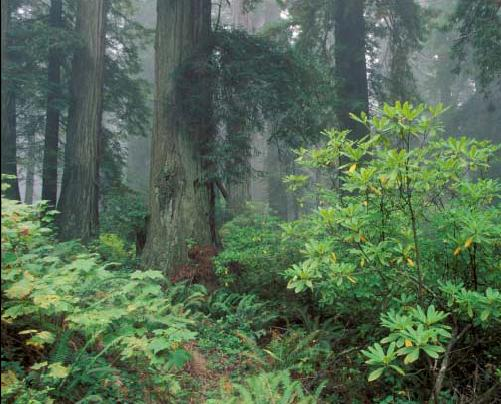
- Headwaters Forest in Northern California
- Interactive map of Headwaters Forest Reserve
- Location: Humboldt County, California, United States
- Coordinates: 40.63766°N 124.07959°W
- Area: 7,472 acres (30.24 km^{2})
- Established: March 1999
- Visitors: 8,000 (in 2007)
- Governing body: Bureau of Land Management / State of California

The Headwaters Forest Reserve is a group of old growth coast redwood (Sequoia sempervirens) groves in the Northern California coastal forests ecoregion near Humboldt Bay of the U.S. state of California. Comprising about 7,472 acres (30.24 km^{2}), it is managed by the Bureau of Land Management (BLM) as part of the National Landscape Conservation System.

The climate is characterized by maritime conditions of cool, wet and foggy winters and cool to warm cloudy summers. Elevations range from 100 feet (30 m) to over 2,000 feet (610 m).

== Overview ==
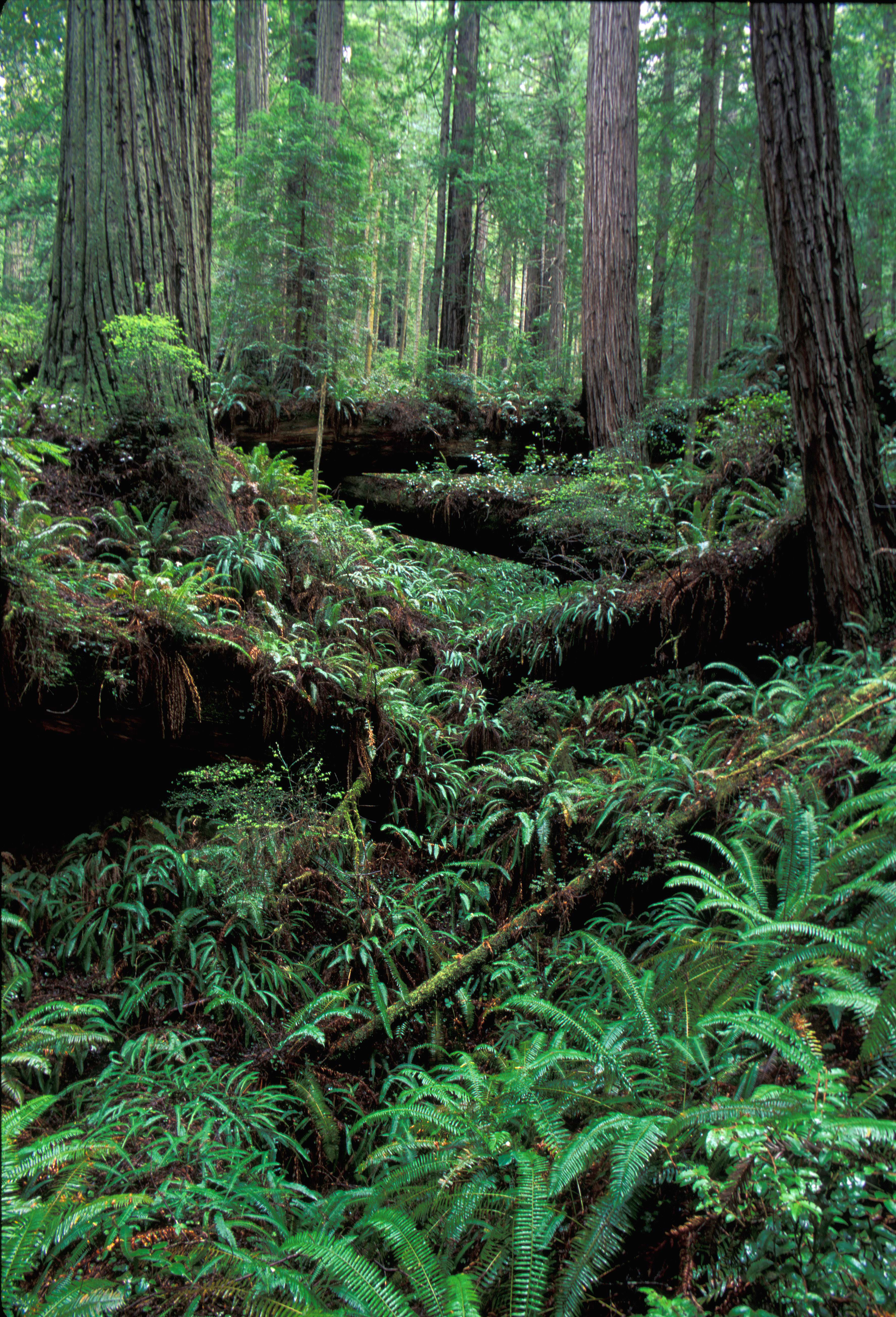
Headwaters Forest Reserve

The reserve was established in 1999 (H.R. 2107, Title V. Sec.501.) The reserve was created after a 15-year effort to save the ancient ecosystem (with some trees estimated at over two thousand years old), from being clearcut.

This reserve of 7,472 acres (30.24 km^{2}) is public land and is under the stewardship of the US Department of the Interior, Bureau of Land Management (BLM). Of the total area, 3,088 acres (12.50 km^{2}) are old-growth redwood stands, surrounded by 4,384 acres (17.74 km^{2}) of previously harvested timberlands. These were included in the purchase to protect the watershed related to the old-growth forest. The reserve is located about 6 miles (9.7 km) southeast of Eureka, California and is managed by BLM officials from the agency's Arcata Field Office in nearby Arcata. The historic town of Falk and lumber mill site is within the reserve.

According to the BLM, "the reserve is set aside to protect and preserve the ecological and wildlife values in the area, particularly the stands of old-growth redwood that provide habitat for the threatened Marbled Murrelet, Northern Spotted Owl, native salmon stocks, and other old growth forest dependent species..." It also protects stream systems that provide habitat for the threatened coho salmon.

Other forest trees in the reserve include Douglas-fir, tanoak, Sitka spruce, western red ceder, western hemlock and red alder. There are limited distribution (CNPS list 4) plants in the reserve, including the heart-shaped twayblade and Kellogg's lily.

The Headwaters Forest Reserve is one of the few remaining refuges for the marbled murrelet, an endangered seabird. Marbled murrelets make their nests on large redwood tree branches between March 25 and September 15. The seabird nesting can be disastrously disrupted by human activity. During breeding season, approximately June 25 to August 1, visitors are prohibited from entering the forest.

== History ==
By the late 20th century, most of the forest was owned by the Pacific Lumber Company, which became under the leadership of Charles Hurwitz and his company Maxxam, Inc, as the result of a hostile takeover in 1985. Maxxam, Inc. changed logging policies at Pacific Lumber Company, replacing it with clearcutting. Almost 60 per cent of the reserve was harvested by mostly clearcutting; more than 35 miles (56 km) of roads were constructed, resulting in more than 100 stream crossings, which greatly degraded watershed ability to store and filter water runoff. The untouched portion is dense, old-growth forest with pristine watershed conditions.

The area was identified and named in March 1987 by activist Greg King after a solo hike throughout Pacific Lumber's northern ancient redwood holdings. A journalist, King pioneered redwood tree-sitting and staged other direct actions over a five-year period to draw national attention to Maxxam's liquidation of the world's last privately held ancient redwood groves.

This had been the site of decades of protests called "Headwaters" (1997–2009), a fight against the logging policies of the then-privately owned forest.

Headwaters Forest Reserve is the largest area of old-growth redwoods protected as a result of the Redwood Summer protests.

An agreement between Department of the Interior and Pacific Lumber Company was crafted in September, 1996. The agreement has two main parts: first, it provided $380 million of public funds for the purchase of the reserve. Second, it required a Habitat Conservation Plan (HCP) be developed and approved to allow limited logging on the remaining 211,000 acres (850 km^{2}) of Pacific Lumber Company timberland.

Public Law 105-83 was the federal legislation authorizing the acquisition. H.R. 2107 was passed by the US Congress in October 1997 which committed the government's share of $250 million of the purchase price. California provided its share of $130 million in Chapter 615, Statutes of 1998 with a requirement of stricter conditions regarding the Habitat Conservation Plan. Specifically, wider no-cut buffer zones, prohibitions on logging in certain areas, and a requirement for watershed analysis. This legislation established a specific boundary with access points, called for joint federal-state acquisition with the Bureau of Land Management, the managing agency and the State of California having a conservation easement, and required a management plan for the forest. The California state easement gives the state oversight responsibility to ensure "all human activities with the Headwaters Forest shall be consistent with the stated goals and purposes..." The California Department of Fish and Wildlife represents the state's interest. Chapter 615 authorized purchase of two additional portions, the Owl Creek, and the Grizzly Creek properties. It provided Humboldt County with $12 million as economic assistance.

== See also ==
- Death of David Chain
- Judi Bari
- Julia Butterfly Hill, and her tree "Luna"
- Forest Reserve Act of 1891, United States
