= Providian =

Credit card issuers

Providian Financial Corporation
- Company type: Acquired; formerly Public (NYSE: PVN)
- Industry: Finance and Insurance
- Founded: 1997
- Headquarters: San Francisco, California
- Key people: Joseph W. Saunders, Chairman, President, & CEO; Anthony F. Vuoto, Vice Chairman & CFO; Warren Wilcox, Vice Chairman of Planning and Marketing
- Products: Financial services
- Revenue: $2.6 billion USD (2004)
- Number of employees: 3,500
- Parent: Washington Mutual Inc (at time of acquisition); JPMorgan Chase (since 2008)

Providian Financial Corporation was an American financial services company founded in 1997, which became one of the leading credit card issuers in the United States before it was sold to Washington Mutual for approximately US$6.5 billion in October 2005. The company emphasized borrowers with lower income and lower credit ratings. Providian was headquartered in San Francisco, California, and had more than 10 million card holders at the time of its sale. Washington Mutual, Inc., continued to run the company as a wholly owned subsidiary, out of its San Francisco headquarters. At its peak, the company employed approximately 13,000 people nationwide. Providian had significant operations in California, New Hampshire, and Texas.

== History ==
In 1981, the Parker Pen company acquired two banks to start a credit card company by the name of First Deposit, based in San Francisco. In 1984, First Deposit was sold to the Kentucky insurance company Capital Holding, later renamed Providian. When Providian's insurance operations were acquired by Aegon, Providian's credit card business was spun off as a separate company.

Providian was a company that sold credit in the "subprime" market. Providian provided credit cards primarily to the lowest income groups in the U.S. at high interest rates. The annual percentage rates (APR) charged by Providian were as high as 29.9 percent.

In a March 1999 memorandum published by the San Francisco Chronicle, the founder of the company, Andrew Kahr, asked company executives about its customers: "Is any bit of food too small to grab when you're starving and when there is nothing else in sight? The trick is charging a lot, repeatedly, for small doses of instrumental [sic]credit." Many critics contended that the extended credit makes the borrower poorer than before the credit was extended. Having the opposite effect on officers and directors of the company, making them conspicuously wealthier. David Alvarez, former president of the integrated-card unit, made a US$12.2 million profit selling his stock before the company disclosed that it was in deep trouble. Larry Thompson sold all his stock having a value of approximately US$4.7 million following his confirmation hearing and a short time before Providian's financial problems became public information and the stock price plummeted.

=== Class action suits ===
Beginning in mid-1999, a number of class-action suits were filed against the company regarding aggressive sales tactics for various "credit protection" services being sold to Providian credit card holders.

On November 7, 2000, the Hon. Stuart R. Pollak of the Superior Court of California, the City and County of San Francisco, granted final approval to a settlement agreement in the case, and certified a settlement class. The settlement required Providian to pay over $100 million in cash, credits, and other benefits to the class, and to stop certain practices that were at issue in the class actions. Combined with an earlier settlement with governmental entities, the award constitutes the largest settlement ever against a credit card company for alleged widespread unlawful business practices.

Providian National Bank and its parent company, Providian Financial, were accused of deceiving and unfairly charging its customers since June 1995. The case was initiated by the U.S. Office of the Comptroller of the Currency (OCC) and the San Francisco District Attorney’s Office. In 2000, Providian agreed to reimburse $300 million to 3 million customers, who were victims of misleading sales pitches and charged for products they did not want, including Providian credit-protection plan, balance transfers, annual fees, and other services. The settlement was the largest enforcement action ever by the OCC and is the first enforcement action under the Federal Trade Commission Act by a bank regulatory agency.
