= Andrew Kahr =

Andrew Seth Kahr is an American mathematician and financial consultant. He was the founder and CEO of First Deposit Corp., which was later acquired by Providian.

== Life and career ==
=== Early life and education ===
Kahr grew up in New York City, where he attended the Fieldston School of the Ethical Culture Society. He went to Harvard University in 1957 and graduated three years later. He earned his Ph.D. in mathematics in 1962 at the Massachusetts Institute of Technology. His thesis was "A Minimal Reduction Class for the Entscheidungsproblem". Following that he attended Harvard Business School.

=== Financial career ===
During the 1970s Kahr worked at Merrill Lynch, where he gained recognition for developing the cash management account, a brokerage account that automatically swept investment income into a money market fund and could be used for payments like a bank account. He developed a similar product, the Schwab One account, for Charles Schwab. Kahr also established the first non-bank bank, whereby a bank was stripped of one of its traditional functions — demand deposit accounts or commercial loans — making it exempt from provisions of the Bank Holding Company Act, such as the prohibition on doing business across state lines.

In 1981 Kahr partnered with the Parker Pen Company to create First Deposit Corp., a non-bank bank that issued credit cards targeting the subprime cardholder market. First Deposit, later acquired by Providian Financial, used Kahr's research to identify the most profitable subprime customers — those who paid interest on revolving balances — and then offered them enticements such as zero percent introductory rates, cashback reward programs and 2 percent minimum payments, pairing these with severe penalties for late payments or credit limit violations. Kahr stepped down from managing First Deposit in 1988 but continued to advise the company on marketing tactics. After rapid growth through the 1990s, Providian reported large losses and faced a class action lawsuit over its marketing and disclosure practices. In a series of memos that were revealed in the lawsuit, Kahr urged the company to "squeeze customers" and to avoid disclosing card expenses. Providian terminated its relationship with Kahr in 2000.

Kahr has written commentary for American Banker, a trade magazine.
