= 1201 Third Avenue =

Skyscraper in Seattle, Washington

Tower 1201
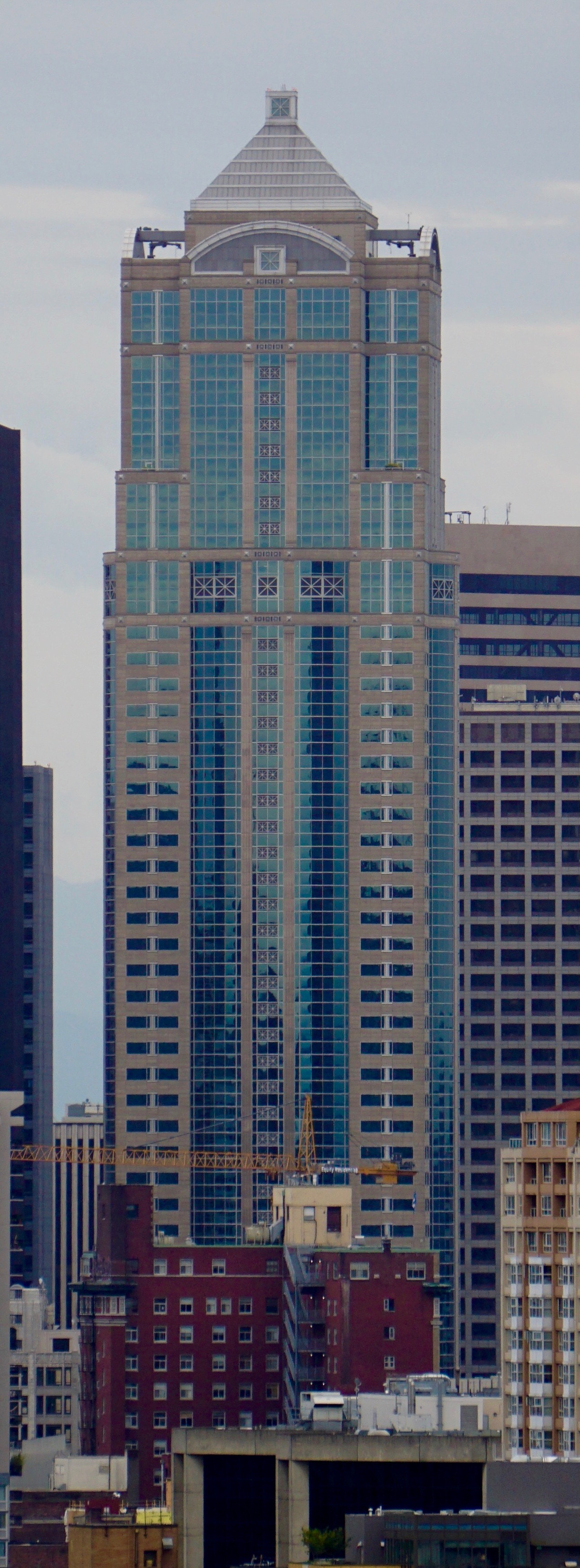
- Seen from Kerry Park in August 2015

- Location within Downtown Seattle
- Former names: Washington Mutual Tower; The Spark Plug; 1201 Third Avenue

General information
- Type: Commercial offices
- Location: 1201 Third Avenue; Seattle, Washington, U.S.
- Coordinates: 47.6072°N 122.3361°W
- Completed: 1988

Height
- Roof: 235.31 m (772.0 ft)

Technical details
- Floor count: 55; 6 below ground
- Floor area: 103,572 m^{2} (1,114,840 sq ft)

Design and construction
- Architects: Kohn Pedersen Fox Associates; The McKinley Architects
- Developer: Wright Runstad & Co.
- Structural engineer: KPFF Consulting Engineers
- Main contractor: Howard S. Wright Construction

Website
- www.tower1201.com

Tower 1201 (formerly known as Washington Mutual Tower, and more recently 1201 Third Avenue) is a 235.31-meter (772.0 ft), 55-story skyscraper in Downtown Seattle, in the U.S. state of Washington. It is the third-tallest building in the city, the eighth-tallest on the West Coast of the United States, and the 97th-tallest in the United States. Developed by Wright Runstad & Company, construction began in 1986 and finished in 1988. Tower 1201 was designed by Kohn Pedersen Fox Associates and The McKinley Architects. The building was the world headquarters of the financial company Washington Mutual from the building's opening until 2006, when the company moved across the street to the WaMu Center (renamed the Russell Investments Center after the bank collapsed in 2008).

== History ==
Kohn Pedersen Fox was hired to design the tower while visiting Seattle to be interviewed as a possible candidate for the job of designing the Seattle Art Museum. It was the first major office building built under Seattle's 1985 downtown zoning plan, largely implemented in response to the Columbia Center, which called for height limits, interesting profiles, and height and density bonuses for public amenities to create a 24-hour downtown. The tower took advantage of all the height bonuses for public amenities that the 1985 plan called for including an entrance to the Metro Bus Tunnel (later renamed the Downtown Seattle Transit Tunnel), retail space, day care, public plaza, sculptured top, hillside public escalators, and lobby/atrium public access, as well as donating $2.5 million for off-site housing. By providing the amenities the designers were able to add 28 stories to the tower and almost double the base floor area ratio of the site. The building was built on the site of the 12-story Savoy Hotel which was imploded in 1986; however, the architects were able to incorporate two aluminum castings from the Savoy into the design of the tower. Another building on the same block, the historic Brooklyn (Hotel) Building was retained and this too was factored into the design of the tower.

The New York Times named it one of the three best new office buildings in the United States in 1988, and in the May 1989 issue of Architecture Magazine Walter McQuade called it "perhaps the best recent addition to any U.S. skyline". Paul Goldberger said of the tower, "The building seems proud of its height; for all its classical elements it has a certain sleekness, and in this sense it is characteristic of our time, at least in intention, for it bespeaks a desire to combine the formal imagery of classicism and the energizing aura of modernity." Seattlites have voted the 55-story skyscraper as one of their favorite buildings. The building is managed by Wright Runstad & Company.

MetLife Real Estate Investments and Clarion Partners bought the building in 2012 for $548.8 million.

The building is home to a perch for Peregrine falcons, who are monitored using a public webcam that was installed in 1994.

In 2021, JPMorgan Chase (who acquired the remaining assets of Washington Mutual) moved into a 20,000-square-foot (1,900 m^{2}) space at 1201 Third Avenue. The single-floor space is used by 160 employees in the bank's cybersecurity and technology division and was completed in 2022. The Puget Sound Regional Council, a metropolitan planning organization, moved its headquarters to the fifth floor of 1201 Third Avenue in January 2024. Perkins Coie, an original tenant, plans to move to the nearby Russell Investments Center in 2025 and vacate their space at 1201 Third Avenue.

== See also ==
- List of tallest buildings
- List of tallest buildings in Seattle
- List of tallest buildings in the United States

== Gallery ==
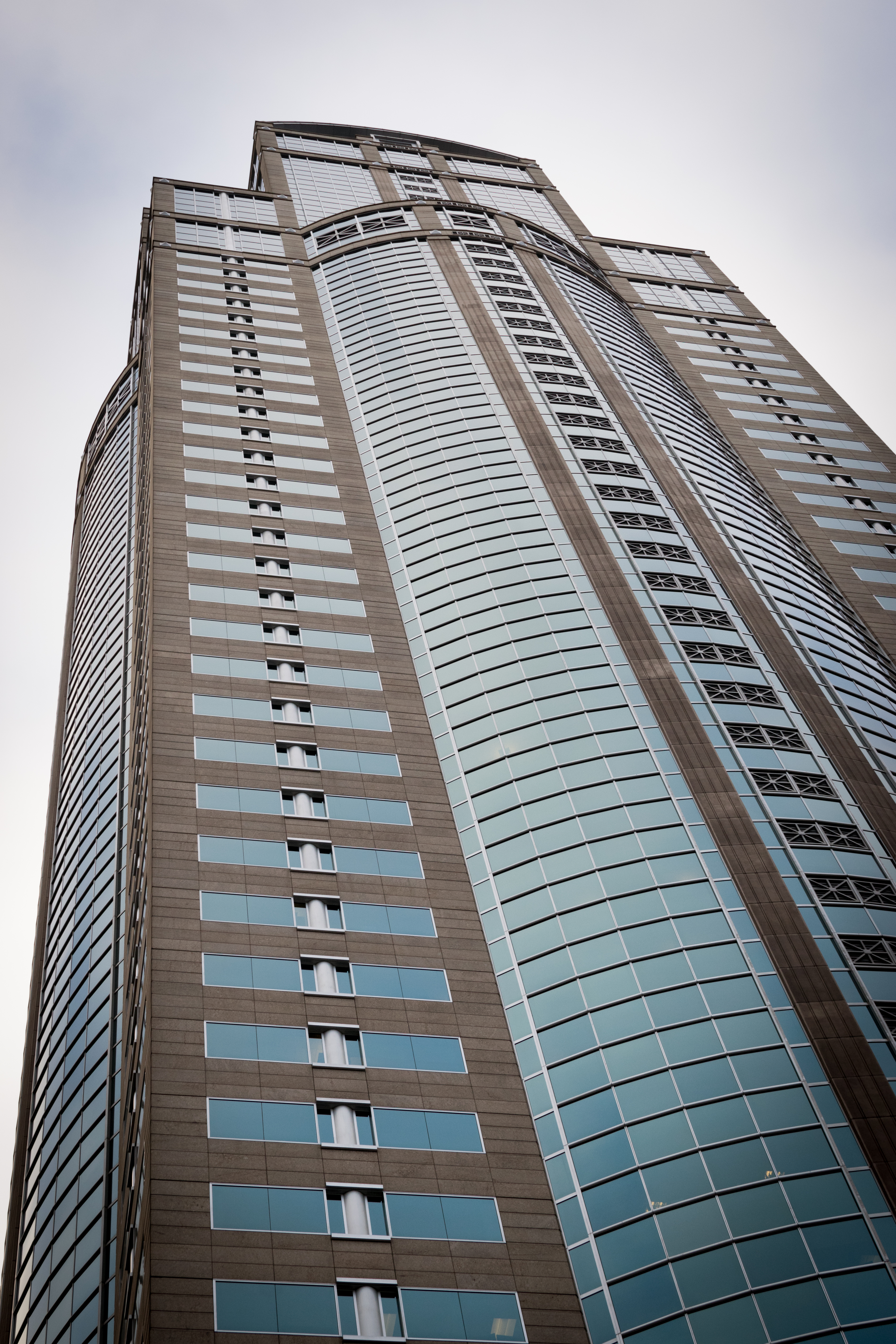
1201 Third at street level

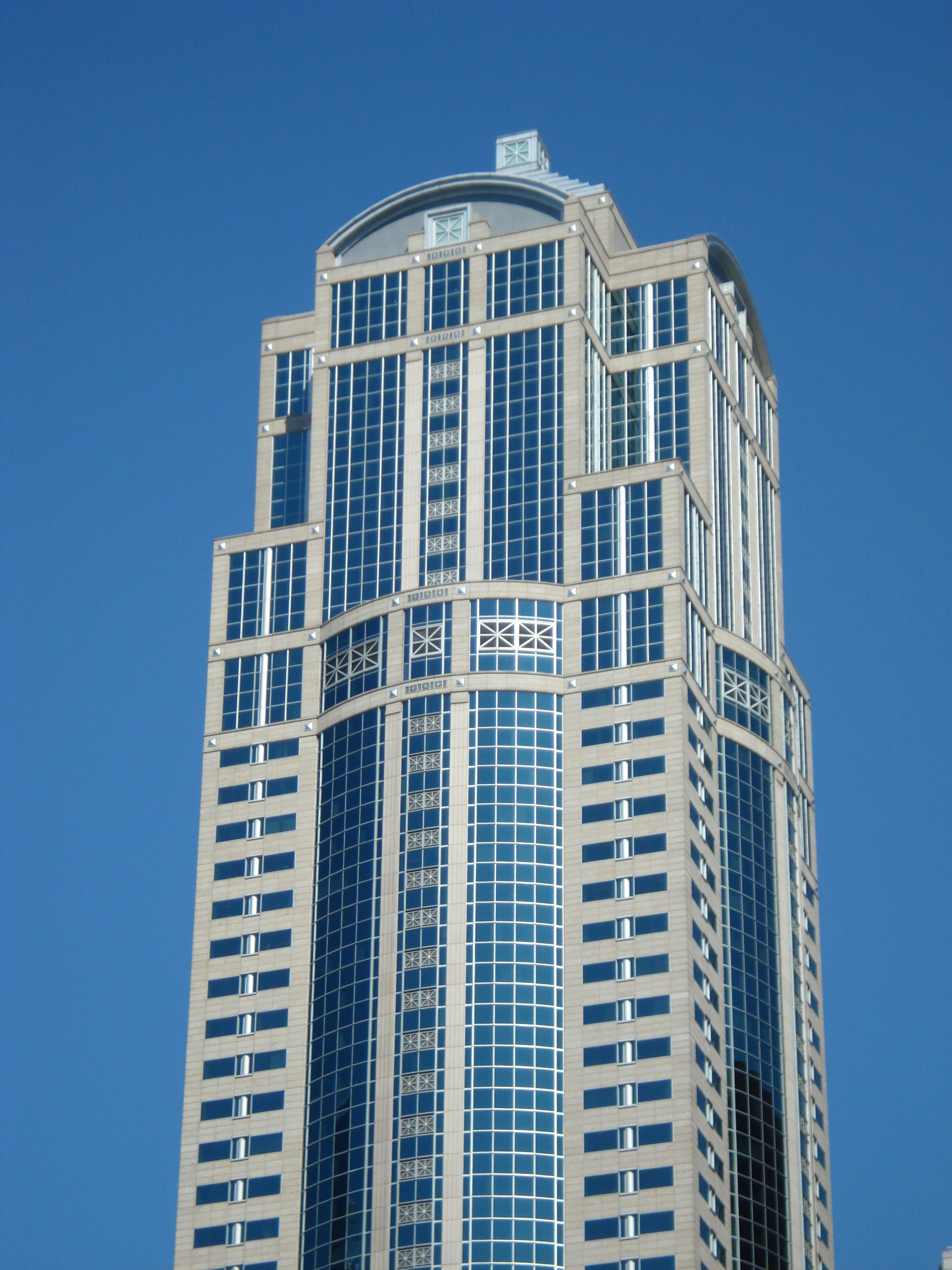
West face of 1201 Third

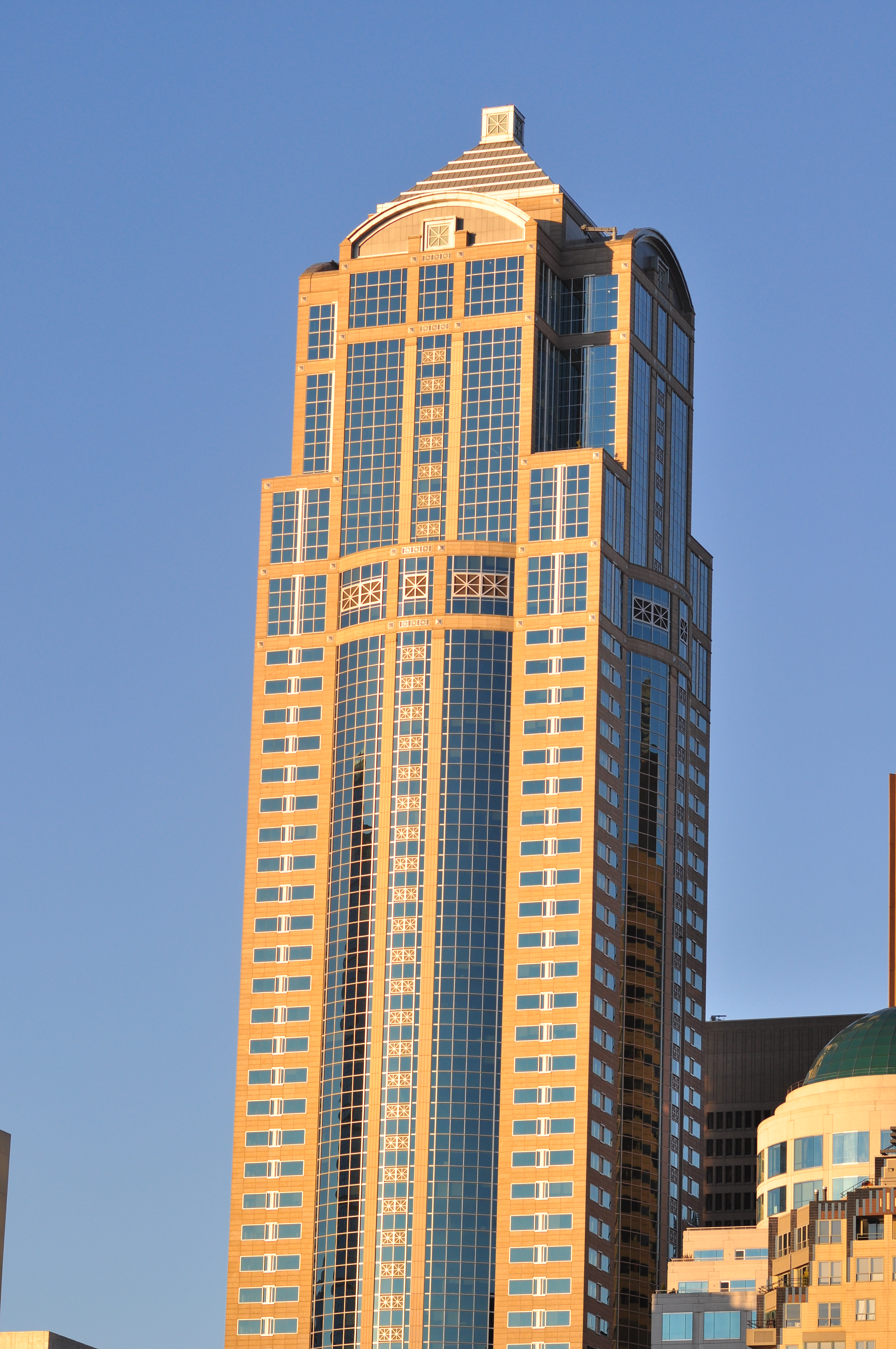
1201 Third from Elliott Bay
