= Washington Mutual =

American bank holding company (1889–2008)

Washington Mutual, Inc.
- Final WaMu logo by Wolff Olins from 2006 to 2008.
- Trade name: Washington National Building Loan and Investment Association (1889–1908); Washington Savings and Loan Association (1908–1917); Washington Mutual Savings Bank (1917–1994); Washington Mutual Bank (1994–2006); WaMu Bank (2006–2008)
- Type: Public
- Traded as: NYSE: WM
- Industry: Finance and Insurance
- Founded: September 25, 1889; 137 years ago
- Defunct: September 25, 2008; 18 years ago
- Fate: Bankruptcy and liquidation: Washington Mutual Bank was closed by the OTS and placed into the receivership of the FDIC, which sold it to JPMorgan Chase.; The bank's holding company subsequently filed for Chapter 11 bankruptcy.
- Successors: JPMorgan Chase; Mr. Cooper Group
- Headquarters: 1201 Third Avenue, Seattle, Washington, United States
- Key people: Kerry Killinger (CEO)
- Products: Consumer banking Financial services
- Revenue: US$15.962 billion
- Total assets: ▼US$ 267.638 million (2013); ▼US$ 339.916 million (2012)
- Number of employees: 49,403
- Website: Archived official website at the Wayback Machine (archive index)

Washington Mutual, Inc (often abbreviated to WaMu) was an American savings bank holding company based in Seattle. It was the parent company of Washington Mutual Bank, which was the largest savings and loan association in the United States until its collapse in 2008.

On September 25, 2008, the United States Office of Thrift Supervision (OTS) seized WaMu's banking operations and placed them under the receivership of the Federal Deposit Insurance Corporation (FDIC). The OTS took the action due to the withdrawal of US$16.7 billion in deposits during a 9-day bank run (amounting to 9% of the deposits it had held on June 30, 2008). The FDIC sold the banking subsidiaries (minus unsecured debt and equity claims) to JPMorgan Chase for $1.9 billion, which had been considering acquiring WaMu as part of a plan internally nicknamed "Project West". All WaMu branches were rebranded as Chase branches by the end of 2009. The holding company was left with $33 billion in assets, and $8 billion in debt, after being stripped of its banking subsidiary by the FDIC. The next day, it filed for Chapter 11 voluntary bankruptcy in Delaware, where it was incorporated.

Regarding total assets under management, WaMu's closure and receivership is the largest bank failure in American financial history. Before the receivership action, it was the sixth-largest bank in the United States. According to WaMu's 2007 SEC filing, the holding company held assets valued at $327.9 billion (~$490 billion in 2025).

On March 20, 2009, WaMu filed suit against the FDIC in the United States District Court for the District of Columbia, seeking damages of approximately $13 billion (~$18.9 billion in 2025) for an alleged unjustified seizure and unfair low sale price to JPMorgan Chase. JPMorgan Chase promptly filed a counterclaim in the Federal Bankruptcy Court in Delaware, where the WaMu bankruptcy proceedings had been continuing since the Office of Thrift Supervision's seizure of the holding company's bank subsidiaries.

== Business operations prior to bank receivership ==
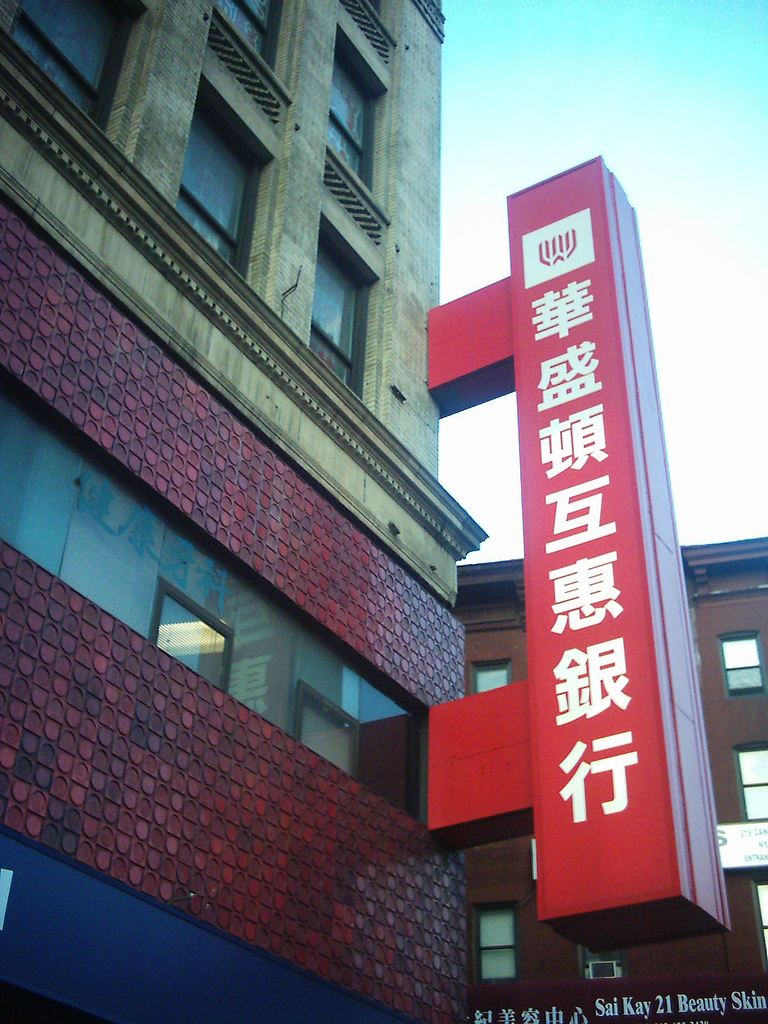
A former WaMu branch in the Chinatown section of New York City (2004)

Despite its name, WaMu ceased being a mutual company in 1983 when it demutualized and became a public company on March 11. On June 30, 2008, WaMu had total assets of $307 billion (~$450 billion in 2025), with 2,239 retail branch offices operating in 15 states, with 4,932 ATMs, and 43,198 employees. It held liabilities in the form of deposits of $188.3 billion, and owed $82.9 billion to the Federal Home Loan Bank, and had subordinated debt of $7.8 billion. It held as assets of $118.9 billion in single-family loans, of which $52.9 billion were "option adjustable rate mortgages" (option ARMs), with $16 billion in subprime mortgage loans, and $53.4 billion of Home Equity lines of Credit (HELOCs) and credit cards receivables of $10.6 billion. It was servicing for itself and other banks loans totaling $689.7 billion, of which $442.7 were for other banks. It had non-performing assets of $11.6 billion, including $3.23 billion in payment option ARMs and $3.0 billion in subprime mortgage loans.

On September 15, 2008, the holding company received a credit rating agency downgrade. From that date through September 24, 2008, WaMu experienced a bank run whereby customers withdrew $16.7 billion in deposits over those nine days, and in excess of $22 billion in cash outflow since July 2008, both conditions which ultimately led the Office of Thrift Supervision to close the bank.

The FDIC then sold most of the bank's assets to JPMorgan Chase for $1.9 billion in cash plus assumption of all secured debt and some unsecured debt. Claims of the subsidiary bank's equity holders, senior and subordinated debt (all primarily owned by the holding company) were not assumed by JPMorgan Chase.

== History ==
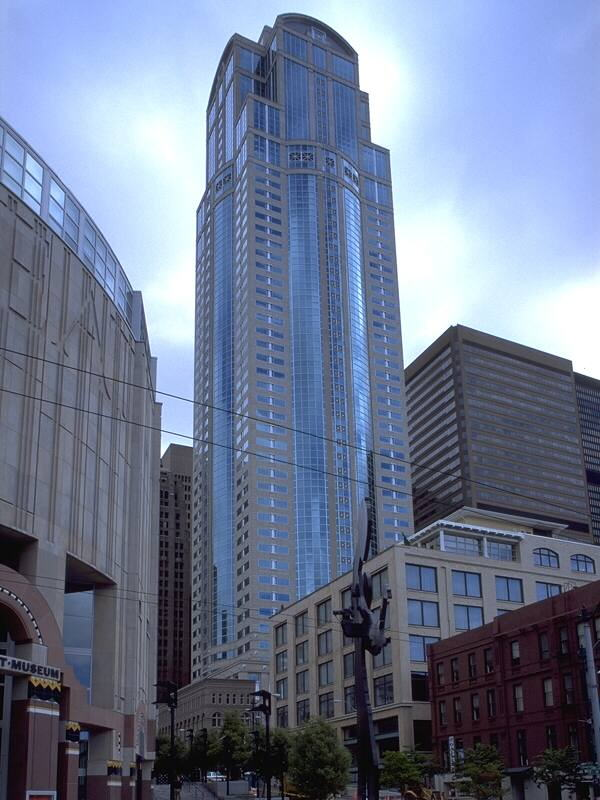
The WaMu Tower at 1201 Third Avenue in Seattle, Washington

=== Mutual savings bank ===
WaMu was incorporated as the Washington National Building Loan and Investment Association on September 25, 1889, after the Great Seattle Fire destroyed 120 acres (49 ha) of the central business district of Seattle. The newly formed company made its first home mortgage loan on the West Coast on February 10, 1890. It changed its name to Washington Savings and Loan Association on June 25, 1908. By September 12, 1917, it was operating under the name Washington Mutual Savings Bank. The company purchased its first company, the financially distressed Continental Mutual Savings Bank, on July 25, 1930. Its marketing slogan for much of its history was "The Friend of the Family".

=== Post-demutualization growth ===
In April 1982, WaMu purchased the brokerage firm Murphey Favre for undisclosed amount in cash and demutualized the following year, converting into a capital stock savings bank. Stock in the capital stock savings bank was first offered for sale on March 11, 1983. By 1989, its assets had doubled.

In November 1994, WaMu reorganized as a holding company, Washington Mutual, Inc. It separated the non-banking units from its primary banking unit, Washington Mutual Savings Bank, which was simultaneously renamed Washington Mutual Bank. The company's stock continued to trade on Nasdaq under WAMU.

In October 2005, WaMu purchased the formerly "subprime" credit card issuer Providian for approximately $6.5 billion, although Providian's new management team's strategy of targeting Prime credit card consumers had been underway since 2001, therefore the credit card unit's nonperforming loan portfolio had improved significantly prior to the company's sale to WaMu. In March 2006, WaMu began the move into its new headquarters, WaMu Center, located in downtown Seattle. The company's previous headquarters, WaMu Tower, stands about a block away from the new building on Second Avenue. In August 2006, WaMu began using the official abbreviation of WaMu in all but legal situations.

==== Acquisitions ====
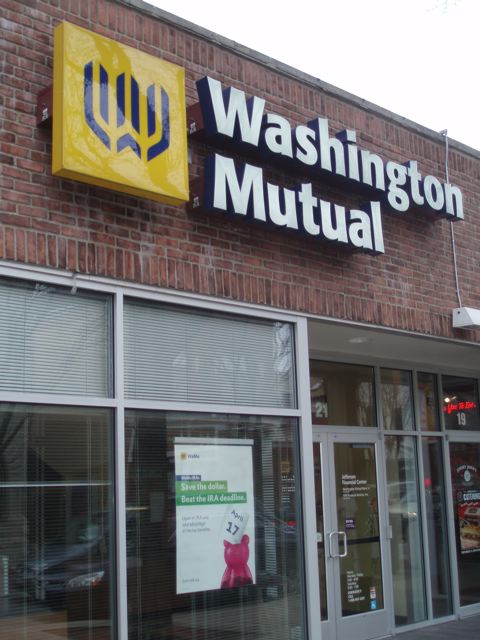
A WaMu office in Naperville, Illinois

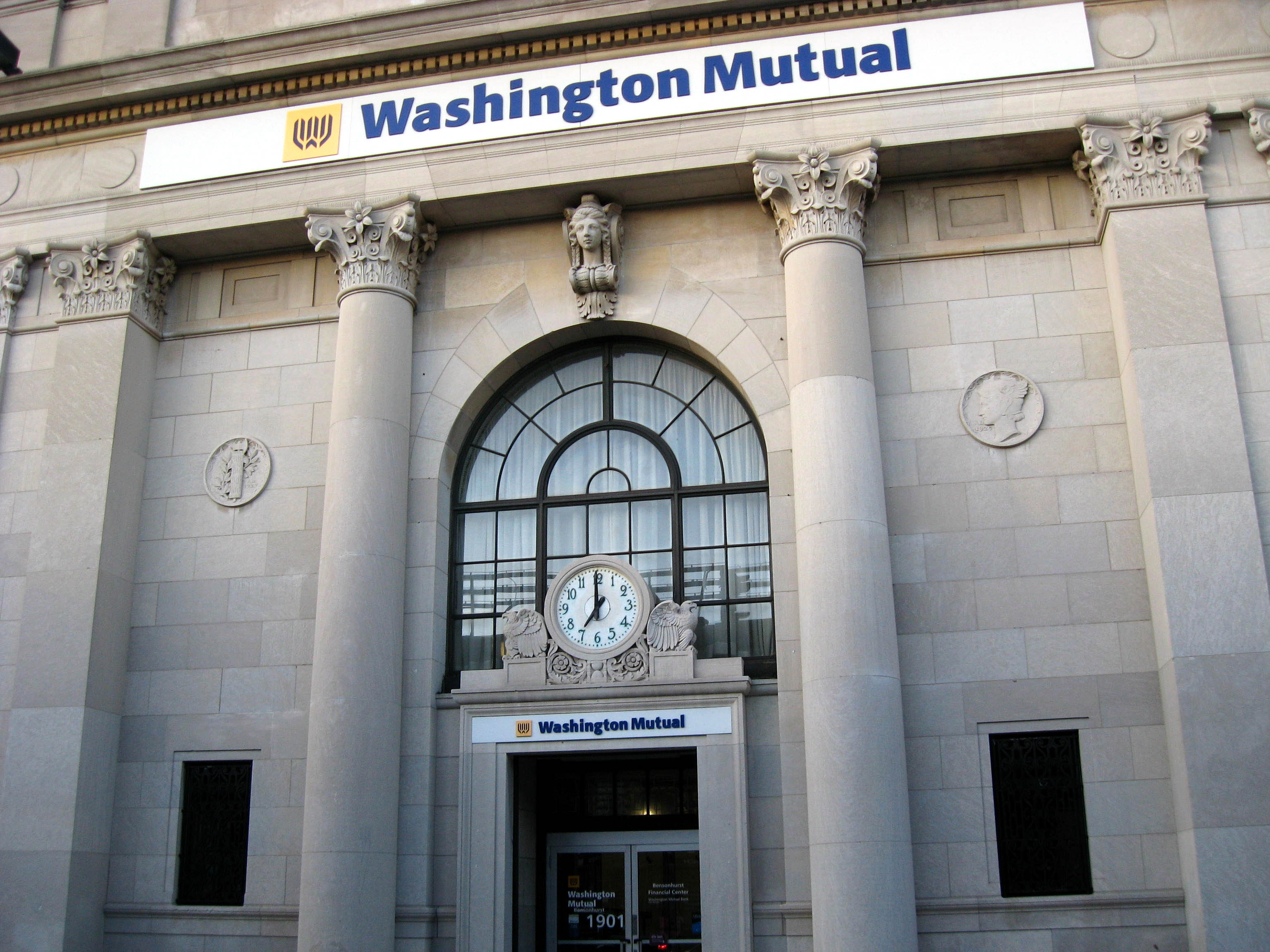
Former Dime Savings Bank branch in Brooklyn, New York

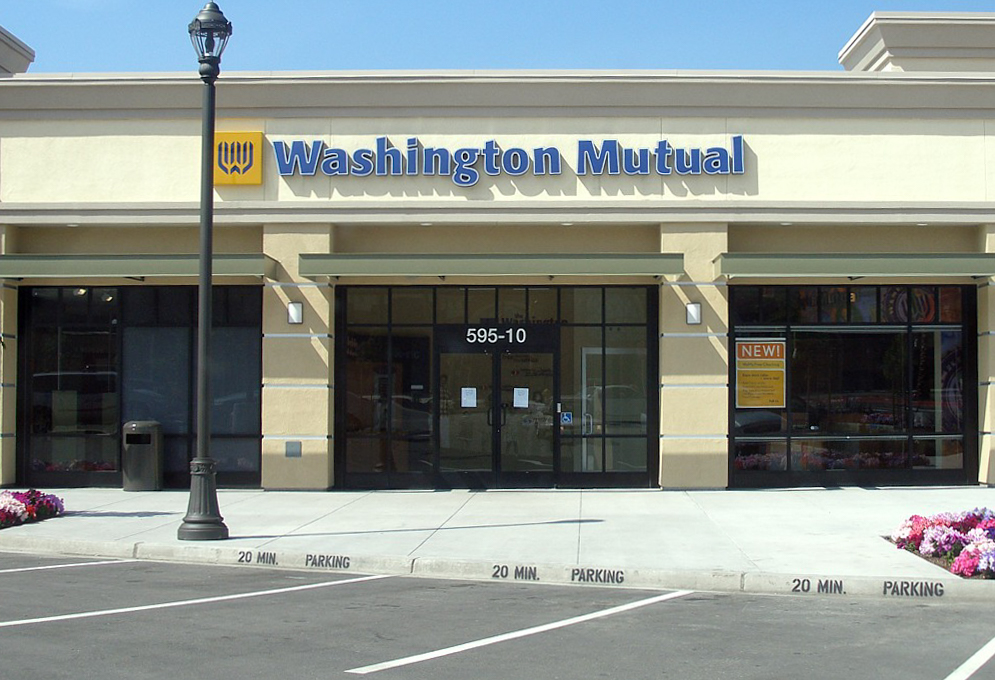
A WaMu Financial Center in San Jose, California

After the acquisition of Murphey Favre, WaMu made numerous acquisitions with the aim of expanding the corporation. By acquiring companies including PNC Mortgage, Fleet Mortgage and Homeside Lending, WaMu became the third-largest mortgage lender in the U.S. With the acquisition of Providian Financial Corporation in October 2005, WaMu became the nation's 9th-largest credit-card company.

Many of WaMu's acquisitions became reviled as the rapid post-merger integrations resulted in numerous errors. The purchase of the original PNC Mortgage came at a time when subprime lending was in a "boom" period, with PNC Financial Services believing that the market was too volatile. (PNC later re-entered the mortgage market in 2009 through its acquisition of National City Corp., with no plans to re-enter subprime lending.) The Dime merger resulted in account ownership to be split with account beneficiaries. The Fleet Mortgage merger resulted in entire loans simply disappearing—being serviced, but unable to be found by customer service representatives.

=== Expansion ===
==== Washington ====
In April 1983, WaMu announced the pending acquisition of three branch offices from the Tacoma-based United Mutual Savings Bank for $3.25 million (~$8.82 million in 2025). In April 1984, WaMu announced the pending acquisition of the Spokane-based Lincoln Mutual Savings Bank with 14 of its 16 branch offices for $4.5 million. At the time of the announcement, WaMu had 39 branch offices, mostly in western Washington.

In May 1987, WaMu announced the pending acquisition of the Wenatchee-based Columbia Federal Savings Bank for $40 million and also the Seattle-based Shoreline Savings Bank for $7.5 million. At the time of the announcement in May 1987, WaMu had 50 branch offices, all within Washington state. Both acquisitions were completed in April 1988.

In January 1990, WaMu announced the pending acquisition of all seven offices of the Seattle-based Old Stone Bank of Washington from the Rhode Island–based Old Stone Corporation for an undisclosed amount. Old Stone originally entered the state of Washington through the acquisition of the ailing Seattle-based Citizens Federal Savings and Loan Association in 1985 with the assistance of the Federal Savings and Loan Insurance Corporation. The acquisition by WaMu was completed in June 1990 for $10 million.

In June 1990, WaMu announced the completed acquisition of all six offices of the failed Walla Walla–based Frontier Federal Savings and Loan Association in Eastern Washington from the Resolution Trust Corporation for $1.8 million (~$3.91 million in 2025).

In September 1990, WaMu announced the completed acquisition of all three Washington branches of the failed Utah-based Williamsburg Federal Savings and Loan Association from the Resolution Trust Corporation for $1.3 million (~$2.83 million in 2025).

In November 1990, WaMu announced the pending acquisition of the Vancouver-based VanFed Bancorp with its Vancouver Federal Savings Bank subsidiary for $23.3 million (~$50.7 million in 2025). At the time of the announcement in November 1990, WaMu had 75 branch offices, all within Washington state. The acquisition was completed in August 1991.

The acquisition of the Pacific Northwest branch offices from the New York–based CrossLand Savings Bank that was announced in April 1991 and completed in November 1991 gave WaMu four offices within the state of Washington in addition to other offices located in the state of Oregon.

In August 1991, WaMu announced the pending acquisition of the Seattle-based Sound Savings and Loan Association for an undisclosed amount. At the time of the announcement in August 1991, WaMu had 84 branch offices, all within Washington state. The acquisition was completed in January 1992.

In September 1991, WaMu announced the pending acquisition of the Bremerton-based GNW Financial Corporation with its Great Northwest Bank subsidiary for $64 million (~$135 million in 2025) in cash and stock. The acquisition was completed in April 1992.

In December 1991, WaMu announced the pending acquisition of both Washington state branch offices of the California-based World Savings and Loan Association of America, a subsidiary of Golden West Financial, for an undisclosed amount. The acquisition was completed in March 1992.

In August 1992, WaMu announced the pending acquisition of the Lynnwood-based Pioneer Savings Bank for $181 million (~$372 million in 2025) in stock. The acquisition was completed in March 1993.

In October 1992, WaMu announced the pending acquisition of the ailing Seattle-based Pacific First Financial Corporation with its Pacific First Bank subsidiary for $663 million (~$1.36 billion in 2025) from its Canada-based parent Royal Trustco. The acquisition was contingent on having Pacific First dispose of its branch offices in California and having its Canadian parent Royal Trustco assume all of Pacific First's bad loans. The acquisition was completed in April 1993. At the time of the initial announcement in October 1992, WaMu had 118 branch offices in Washington and Oregon while Pacific First had 127 branch offices in Washington, Oregon and California. Pacific First had previously announced that it was trading its California offices for Great Western's Washington offices. As a result of the Pacific First acquisition, WaMu became one of the largest banking institution based upon consumer deposits in the state of Washington, second only to Seafirst.

In June 1994, WaMu announced the pending acquisition of the Bellevue-based Summit Bancorp with its Summit Savings Bank subsidiary for $25 million in stock. At the time of the announcement, WaMu had 231 branch offices in Washington and Oregon. The acquisition was completed in November 1994.

In June 1995, WaMu announced the pending acquisition of the Bellevue-based Enterprise Bank for $26.8 million (~$51.6 million in 2025) in stock, this was WaMu's entry into the commercial banking sector. WaMu named Tom Cleveland President of the commercial banking unit which later included Western Bank in Coos Bay Oregon. At the time of the announcement, WaMu had 260 branch offices. Unlike the previous acquisition targets, Enterprise held a commercial bank charter and not a thrift charter.

==== Oregon ====
In April 1991, WaMu announced the pending acquisition of the 25 offices in the Portland, Oregon / Vancouver, Washington area from the failing New York–based CrossLand Savings Bank, a subsidiary of Brooklyn Bancorp, for an undisclosed amount. The acquisition was completed in November 1991. Seven of the 25 offices were located in Washington with the remainder in Oregon. As part of the transaction, CrossLand Savings closed seven offices in Oregon and three offices in Washington, leaving eleven offices in Oregon and four in Washington. CrossLand had previously entered Oregon (and three other states) through the relatively recent acquisition of the troubled Utah-based Western Savings and Loan Association. The CrossLand acquisition gave WaMu a toe hold entry into Oregon via Portland.

As a result of the Pacific First acquisition in April 1993, WaMu became the fourth largest banking institution based upon consumer deposits within the state of Oregon. Originally, Pacific First grew quickly in Oregon during the late 1980s through the acquisition of troubled savings and loans. By February 1991, Pacific First had 78 branches in Oregon, more than any other thrift. Pacific First had 71 branches in Oregon by July 1992.

In April 1994, WaMu announced the completed acquisition of three Portland-area offices of the failed Portland-based Far West Federal Savings Bank from the Resolution Trust Corporation for $2.2 million (~$4.33 million in 2025).

In October 1995, WaMu announced the pending acquisition of the Coos Bay–based Western Bank for $156 million (~$301 million in 2025) in stock. The acquisition was completed in February 1996. Since Western Bank possessed a commercial bank charter and not a more restrictive savings & loan charter, WaMu decided to allow Western Bank to keep its charter and name and to remain semi-autonomous for a while. At the time of the acquisition, Western Bank had 41 offices throughout Oregon. Five years later, WaMu decided to abandon the Western Bank brand and integrate most of the former Western Bank offices into the existing WaMu network in Oregon in 2001. Due to branch overlaps between the two brands, 12 Western Bank branch offices and one WaMu branch office were sold to the Klamath Falls-based Klamath First Bancorp for $33 million.

==== Idaho ====
In March 1994, WaMu announced that they were planning to expand into the state of Idaho by building new branch offices inside Fred Meyer supermarket stores with the first three being opened in the Boise-area in July and August.

In the following year, WaMu opened a fourth Idaho location in a Moscow supermarket in February 1995.

A branch office in Idaho Falls was acquired from the Utah-based United Savings Bank when WaMu purchased the savings bank in January 1997.

By March 2000, there were 9 locations within Idaho and later 22 locations in 2008 when Chase acquired WaMu.

==== Utah ====
In July 1994, WaMu announced the pending acquisition of the Salt Lake City–based Olympus Capital Corporation with its Olympus Bank, FSB, subsidiary for $52.1 million in stock. At the time of the announcement, WaMu had 250 branch offices in Washington and Oregon while Olympus had eight branch offices in Utah and two in Montana. The acquisition was completed in May 1995.

In March 1996, WaMu announced the pending acquisition of the Ogden-based Utah Federal Savings Bank for an undisclosed amount. At the time of the announcement, Utah Federal had five branch offices while WaMu had 16 within Utah. The acquisition was completed in December 1996 for $15.2 million (~$28.8 million in 2025).

In September 1996, WaMu announced the pending acquisition of the Salt Lake City–based United Western Financial Group Inc. with its United Savings Bank subsidiary for $80.3 million (~$152 million in 2025) in cash. At the time of the announcement, United Savings Bank had eight branch offices in Utah and one in Idaho. The acquisition was completed in January 1997.

==== Montana ====
In May 1995, WaMu acquired two branch offices in Butte as the result of the acquisition of the Utah-based Olympus Capital Corporation with its Olympus Bank FSB subsidiary. Four years later, WaMu later sold the two offices to Glacier Bancorp in 1999 for an undisclosed amount and quietly left the state of Montana.

==== California ====
In July 1996, WaMu announced the pending acquisition of the Fort Worth, Texas-based Keystone Holdings Inc. with its Irvine-based American Savings Bank subsidiary for $1.6 billion (~$3.03 billion in 2025) in stock. At the time of the announcement, WaMu had 317 branch offices in Washington, Oregon, Idaho, Utah and Montana while American Savings Bank had 220 branch offices in California. The acquisition was completed in December 1996. American kept its name after the acquisition. The result of the acquisition nearly doubled the total deposits of all WaMu subsidiaries from $22 billion to $42 billion.

In February 1997, Chatsworth-based Great Western Financial, the holding company of the second largest thrift in the nation Great Western Bank, found itself the target of a hostile takeover attempt of arch-rival H. F. Ahmanson & Co., the holding company of the largest thrift in the nation Home Savings of America, that would have involved $5.8 billion (~$10.8 billion in 2025) worth of stock. Since the two companies had large overlapping territories, many Great Western offices would have been closed by Ahmanson if the takeover attempt had succeeded. The only way to combat a hostile takeover was to find another company, a so-called white knight, that would allow a merger on much better terms. One such company was WaMu. In March, Great Western Financial announced that it had accepted WaMu's merger proposal for $6.6 billion in WaMu stock. Ahmanson quickly increased their bids but the bids were also rejected. Great Western approved the merger with WaMu in June and the merger was completed in July. As part of its merger agreement, it was originally announced that Great Western offices would be allowed to keep the Great Western name and there were later discussion of converting the American Savings offices to the Great Western brand. In the end, it was felt that it was best for the company to have only one brand throughout the nation instead of multiple regional brands so it was announce in December 1997 that both Great Western and American names would be retired in favor of the WaMu name. The previous month, it was announced in November that 85 redundant branch offices were identified in California and were to be closed within the following year. Before the merger was complete, WaMu had a total of 413 branch operating under various names across the country while Great Western had 416 branch offices operating in California and Florida.

In March 1998, WaMu announced the pending acquisition of the Irwindale-based H. F. Ahmanson & Company with its Home Savings of America subsidiary for approximately $10 billion in stock. The acquisition was completed in October 1998 for only $6.9 billion (~$12.7 billion in 2025) in stock. Before the merger was complete, WaMu had a total of 892 branch operating under various names (WaMu, American Savings, Great Western, etc.) across the country while Home Savings had 409 branch offices operating in California and Texas. A few days after the completion of the merger, WaMu announced plans to close 161 branch offices in California.

==== Texas ====
Through the 1998 acquisition of Home Savings, WaMu had gained 48 branch offices in Texas.

In August 2000, WaMu announced the pending acquisition of the Houston-based Bank United Corporation with its 155 branch offices, all located in Texas, for $1.49 billion (~$2.64 billion in 2025) in stock. The acquisition was completed in February 2001.

As a result of branch overlap between Bank United and WaMu, 17 branch offices were closed in Texas, 10 of which were in Houston.

==== New York ====
In June 2001, WaMu announced the pending acquisition of the New York City–based Dime Bancorp with its Dime Savings Bank subsidiary for $5.2 billion (~$9.02 billion in 2025) in cash and stock. The acquisition was completed in January 2002. Dime had 123 branch offices in the New York City area of both New York and New Jersey.

=== Commercial banking ===
With a thrift charter, there were a few things that WaMu was not able to do until it was able to obtain a commercial bank charter, such as making commercial loans above a certain size. To get around this problem, WaMu began to purchase commercial banks and maintain them as separate business entities. In August 1995, WaMu acquired the one office Bellevue-based Enterprise Bank in Washington. A few months later, WaMu acquired the 41 office Coos Bay–based Western Bank in Oregon. By 1997, the Enterprise name and Western Bank name were merged and operated under Western Bank moniker.

After WaMu expanded into California through the acquisitions of American Savings, Great Western, and Home Savings, WaMu quietly acquired the one-office Industrial Bank in the Van Nuys neighborhood of Los Angeles for an undisclosed amount in 1999 and renamed it WM Business Bank.

By 2001, WaMu had 38 specialized business banking centers operating under the Western Bank name in the Northwest and the WM Business Bank name in California when they decided to exit their ill-fated venture into the commercial banking market that was then dominated with the likes of Wells Fargo and Bank of America.

=== Mortgage banking ===
During the late 1990s and early 2000s, WaMu decided to aggressively expand in the subprime mortgage lending field through the acquisition of existing mortgage companies at a time when other financial institutions were leaving.

In May 1999, WaMu announced the pending acquisition of the Orange, California-based Long Beach Financial Corporation with its Long Beach Mortgage Company subsidiary for $350.4 million (~$636 million in 2025) in cash and stock. The acquisition was completed in October 1999. Long Beach had specialized in providing subprime mortgages. Some of Long Beach's questionable business practices may have led to WaMu's failure in 2008.

In January 2000, WaMu announced the pending acquisition of the Los Angeles–based Alta Residential Mortgage Trust for $23 million (~$40.8 million in 2025).

In October 2000, WaMu announced the pending acquisition of the Vernon Hills, Illinois-based PNC Mortgage Corporation and PNC Mortgage Securities Corporation from the PNC Financial Services Group for $605 million (~$1.07 billion in 2025) in cash. The acquisition was completed in February 2001. The result of the PNC Mortgage acquisition made WaMu the nation's third-largest lender.

In April 2001, WaMu announced the pending acquisition of the Columbia, South Carolina–based Fleet Mortgage Corporation from FleetBoston Financial for $660 million (~$1.14 billion in 2025) in cash. The acquisition was completed in June 2001. The result of the Fleet Mortgage acquisition made WaMu the nation's second-largest mortgage-servicing business.

In December 2001, WaMu announced the pending acquisition of the Jacksonville, Florida-based HomeSide Lending, Inc. from the National Australia Bank for $1.9 billion (~$3.29 billion in 2025). The agreement did not include the mortgage servicing rights and related financial hedges for the business. The acquisition was completed in March 2002. In August 2002, WaMu announced the pending acquisition of the rest of HomeSide that included the mortgage servicing rights on a mortgage portfolio worth about $131 billion for $1.3 billion in cash and the assumption of $735 million in debt. The acquisition was completed in October 2002.

In July 2002, the San Mateo, California-based Bay View Capital Corporation announced the pending sale of the mortgage loan portfolio for its Bay View Bank subsidiary to WaMu for a "slight premium to book value". The sale was completed in the following month.

In April 2006, WaMu announced the pending acquisition of the Irvine, California-based Commercial Capital Bancorp, Inc. with its Commercial Capital Bank FSB subsidiary for $983 million (~$1.51 billion in 2025) in cash. The acquisition was completed in October 2006. Commercial Capital had specialized in loans for the multifamily and small commercial real estate lending markets and was the third largest multifamily lender in California.

=== Credit cards ===
In June 2001, WaMu announced the pending acquisition of Providian Financial Corporation, tenth-largest credit-card issuer in the country, for $6.45 billion (~$11.2 billion in 2025) in stock and cash. The acquisition was completed in June 2001.

Prior to this acquisition, WaMu had their credit cards initially issued by Associates National Bank and later Citibank South Dakota, N.A. and was one of the largest banking organization that did not issue its own credit cards. In 2005, chairman and chief executive officer Kerry Killinger said that lack of company-issued credit cards was a "major hole in our product line." Credit cards were not mentioned on their website nor in their published annual reports as an available service offered by their company prior to 2001.

=== Rise and fall ===
==== "Wal-Mart of Banking" ====
Chairman and CEO Kerry Killinger had pledged in 2003: "We hope to do to this industry what Wal-Mart did to theirs, Starbucks did to theirs, Costco did to theirs and Lowe's, Home Depot did to their industry. And I think if we've done our job, five years from now you're not going to call us a bank."

Killinger's goal was to build WaMu into the "Wal-Mart of Banking", which would cater to lower- and middle-class consumers that other banks deemed too risky. Complex mortgages and credit cards had terms that made it easy for the least creditworthy borrowers to get financing, a strategy the bank extended in big cities, including Chicago, New York and Los Angeles. WaMu pressed sales agents to approve loans while placing less emphasis on borrowers' incomes and assets. WaMu set up a system that enabled real estate agents to collect fees of more than $10,000 for bringing in borrowers. Variable-rate loans – Option Adjustable Rate Mortgages (Option ARMs) in particular – were especially attractive, because they carried higher fees than other loans and allowed WaMu to book profits on interest payments that borrowers deferred. As WaMu was selling many of its loans to investors, it worried less about defaults.

==== Subprime losses ====
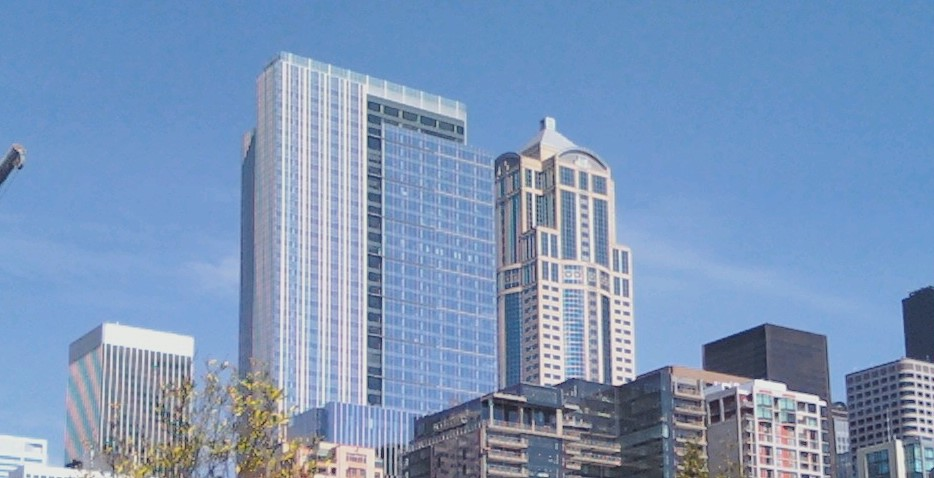
The WaMu Tower (center right) in downtown Seattle was WaMu's corporate headquarters from 1988 until 2006, when the company moved into the new WaMu Center (center left). These buildings have since been renamed; WaMu Tower is now known as 1201 Third Avenue and WaMu Center is now known as Russell Investments Center.

In December 2007, the subsidiary WaMu Bank reorganized its home-loan division, closing 160 of its 336 home-loan offices and removing 2,600 positions in its home-loan staff (a 22% reduction).

In March 2008, on the same weekend that JPMorgan Chase Chairman and CEO Jamie Dimon negotiated the takeover of Bear Stearns, he secretly dispatched members of his team to Seattle to meet with WaMu executives, urging them to consider a quick deal. However, WaMu Chairman and CEO Kerry Killinger rejected JPMorgan Chase's offer that valued WaMu at $8 a share, mostly in stock.

In April 2008, the holding company, responding to losses and difficulties sustained as a result of the subprime mortgage crisis, announced that 3,000 people companywide would lose their jobs, and the company stated its intent to close its approximately 176 remaining stand-alone, home-loan offices, including 23 in Washington and a loan-processing center in Bellevue, Washington. It stopped buying loans from outside mortgage brokers — known in the trade as "wholesale lending." WaMu also announced a $7 billion infusion of new capital by new outside investors led by TPG Capital. TPG agreed to pump $2 billion into the WaMu holding company; other investors, including some of WaMu's current institutional holders, agreed to buy an additional $5 billion in newly issued stock. This angered many investors, as TPG's investment would dilute the holdings of existing shareholders, and as WaMu executives excluded mortgage losses from computing bonuses.

In June 2008, Kerry Killinger stepped down as the chairman, though remaining the chief executive officer. On September 8, 2008, under pressure from investors, the WaMu holding company's board of directors dismissed Killinger as the CEO. Alan H. Fishman, chairman of mortgage broker Meridian Capital Group, and a former chief operating officer of Sovereign Bank, was named the new CEO for 17 days.

==== Seizure by OTS and FDIC ====
By mid-September 2008, WaMu's share price had closed as low as $2.00 (~$3.00 in 2025). It had been worth over $30.00 in September 2007, and had briefly traded as high as $45 in the previous year. While WaMu publicly insisted it could stay independent, earlier in the month it had quietly hired Goldman Sachs to identify potential bidders. However, several deadlines passed without anyone submitting a bid. At the same time, WaMu suffered a massive run (mostly via electronic banking over the internet and wire transfer); customers pulled out $16.7 billion in deposits in a ten-day span.

This led the Federal Reserve and the Treasury Department to step up pressure for WaMu to find a buyer, as a takeover by the Federal Deposit Insurance Corporation (FDIC) could have been a severe drain on the FDIC insurance fund. The FDIC had already had to use a large chunk of its insurance fund after the failure of IndyMac that year. The FDIC ultimately held a secret auction of WaMu Bank. On the morning of Thursday, September 25 (which happened to be the 119th anniversary of WaMu's establishment), regulators informed officials at JPMorgan Chase that they had won the auction.

On Thursday night (shortly after the close of business on the West Coast), the Office of Thrift Supervision seized WaMu Bank and placed it into the receivership of the FDIC. In a statement, the OTS said that the massive run meant that WaMu was no longer sound. The FDIC then sold most of WaMu Bank's assets, including the branch network, to JPMorgan Chase for $1.9 billion. JPMorgan Chase agreed to assume the bank's secured debts and liabilities to depositors. The transaction did not require any FDIC insurance funds. Normally, bank seizures take place after the close of business on Fridays. However, due to the bank's deteriorating condition and leaks that a seizure was imminent, regulators felt compelled to act a day early.

Because JPMorgan Chase bought WaMu's assets for a low price, WaMu's stockholders were nearly wiped out. Its stock price dropped to $0.16 a share, well below its high of a year earlier. In its Chapter 11 filing, WaMu listed assets of $33 billion and debt of $8 billion. (ref. Appendix A). The filing also indicates that enough funds are available for distribution to unsecured creditors.

Within days of the seizure, a hedge fund adviser and investment strategist, Mike Stathis of AVA Investment Analytics, issued a formal complaint to the Securities and Exchange Commission, demonstrating evidence of insider trading. The complaint also alleged that WaMu was not insolvent, and several Wall Street firms and hedge funds had conspired to short the stock. He also stated that he spoke with a reporter from the Associated Press who told him that he was contacted by a WaMu executive hours before the seizure, telling the reporter that it would happen for "political reasons." In later criticisms, Stathis discussed that neither the FDIC nor OTS ever disclosed any evidence of WaMu's insolvency. Stathis stated that within a few weeks of submitting his complaint, he was visited by federal agents who held him in an interrogation room for questioning. As a result of this, Stathis stated that he felt bullied and did not release the SEC complaint into the public domain until a year later.

Shareholders fought what they considered the illegal seizure of WaMu through such websites as WaMuCoup.com and others, claiming that the OTS acted in an arbitrary and capricious manner and seized the bank for political reasons or for the benefit of JPMorgan Chase, which acquired a large network of branches at what they claim to be an unfairly low price. Shareholders claimed that as of the date of the takeover, the bank had enough liquidity to meet all its obligations and was in compliance with the business plan negotiated with the OTS 2 weeks earlier and that the holding company's board and management was kept completely in the dark about the government's negotiations with Chase, hampering the bank's ability to sell itself on its own. Chief executive Alan H. Fishman was flying from New York to Seattle on the day the bank was closed, and eventually received a $7.5 million sign-on bonus and cash severance of $11.6 million (which he declined) after being CEO for 17 days. Senator Maria Cantwell demanded an explanation from the government and threatened to open an investigation and WaMu's former shareholders have threatened a lawsuit demanding compensation for the lost value of their shares.

The seizure of WaMu Bank resulted in the largest bank failure in American financial history, dwarfing the failure of Continental Illinois in 1984.

==== Bankruptcy ====
On September 26, 2008, Washington Mutual, Inc. and its remaining subsidiary, WMI Investment Corp., filed for Chapter 11 bankruptcy. The company was promptly delisted from trading on the New York Stock Exchange, and commenced trading via Pink Sheets. The bankruptcy was the second major filing in as many weeks, after the Lehman Brothers filing eleven days earlier; both bankruptcies far outpaced WorldCom's 2002 filing, which had held the record with just under $104 billion (~$178 billion in 2025) in assets.

All assets but only some liabilities (including deposits, covered bonds, and other secured debt) of WaMu Bank were assumed by JPMorgan Chase. Under the deal, JPMorgan Chase acquired all the banking operations of WaMu, including $307 billion in assets and $188 billion in deposits, for a price of $1.9 billion plus debt assumptions. Unsecured senior debt obligations of the bank were not assumed by JPMorgan Chase, leaving holders of those obligations with little meaningful source of recovery. On the morning of September 26, WaMu Bank customers were informed that all deposits held by WaMu were now liabilities of JPMorgan Chase.

The IRS claimed $12.5 billion in back taxes from WaMu, Inc. The company filed court papers on January 22, 2009, alleging losses were $20 billion (~$29.1 billion in 2025), and the company requested that it pay nothing of the tax debt, stating that the IRS could owe WaMu Inc. a tax refund. In a 2010 settlement between Wash. Mutual Inc. (in receivership), the FDIC, and JPMorgan Chase, a tax refund of about $5.7 billion (~$8.2 billion in 2025) will be shared between Wash. Mutual Inc., JPMorgan Chase and FDIC.

WaMu, Inc. sued the Federal Deposit Insurance Corporation (FDIC) for $13 billion after the sale of its banking operations to JPMorgan Chase. WMI attorneys claim the bank did not get fair value for the bank, and multiple subsidiaries belonging to the parent company were taken.

On January 11, 2010, the United States Department of Justice, Office of the United States Trustee, District of Delaware, pursuant to Section 1102(a)(1) of the Bankruptcy Code, appointed a Committee of Equity Security Holders to represent all shareholders of both preferred and common stock. All of the Motions to Disband the Committee of Equity Security Holders were denied on January 28, 2010, by U.S. Bankruptcy Judge Mary F. Walrath, District of Delaware.

On July 20, 2010, bankruptcy judge Mary Walrath approved a motion of the EC for an examiner to investigate potential legal claims and assets of WMI, handing a victory to shareholders. The Judge directed the examiner to investigate not just the legal settlement with the FDIC and JPMorgan Chase at the heart of WaMu's reorganization, but also all potential claims and assets that are part of the settlement or that will be retained by the company.

On July 26, 2010, U.S. Trustee Roberta A. DeAngelis appointed veteran bankruptcy examiner and McKenna Long & Aldridge LLP partner Joshua R. Hochberg to conduct a probe into the proposed settlement between WMI, JPMorgan Chase and the FDIC. Hochberg is a partner in McKenna Long & Aldridge's Washington office whose practice focuses on individual and corporate white collar defense, internal investigations and compliance.

On August 10, 2010, the bankruptcy judge rejected WaMu Inc.'s effort to obtain personal financial information from shareholders demanding that the company schedule an annual meeting. Attorneys for the EC said that WMI was simply trying to delay scheduling a shareholder meeting by seeking personal information. The judge agreed that WMI was not entitled to the information.

On November 1, 2010, examiner Joshua R. Hochberg from McKenna Long & Aldridge LLP presented his long-awaited report, but it did not meet the expectations of the court, since the report was based on unsworn interviews and confidential attorney-client work. On December 12, the court decided to exclude the examiner's report during the plan confirmation hearings, saying it can't be considered expert testimony or submitted as evidence unless it is subject to questioning to determine the basis of its conclusions.

On January 7, 2011, the bankruptcy court rejected the 6th proposed plan of reorganization, which was proposed by the debtors and their lawyers from Weil, Gotshal & Manges LLP. Judge Mary Walrath focused many of her criticisms on the company's releases of liability granted to directors, officers and others including some hedge funds, who she said did not contribute anything to the settlement. She noted for example that shareholders, who will likely get nothing, should not have to release the company's board from the threat of being sued by them.

On September 14, 2011, the court also rejected the modified 6th proposed plan of reorganization. Judge Mary F. Walrath wrote that four hedge funds that had played a role in WaMu's restructuring might have received confidential information that could have been used to trade improperly in the bank's debt. The four hedge funds are Appaloosa Management, Aurelius Capital Management, Centerbridge Partners and Owl Creek Asset Management.

A seventh plan of reorganization was announced in February 2012 and the company finally emerged from Chapter 11 bankruptcy the following month as WMI Holdings Corporation. By 2015, WMI Holdings was able to raise $598 million (~$793 million in 2025) and was looking for new acquisitions. In 2018 WMI Holdings Corporation merged with Nationstar to form Mr. Cooper Group.

=== Post receivership bank operations ===
During 2009, all of the WaMu Bank branches that had been purchased from the FDIC after the bank had been placed into receivership, were rebranded to Chase or shuttered. All financial documents issued by WaMu were changed to carry the Chase logo. Credit and debit cards issued by WaMu or Providian were changed to carry the Chase logo.

The transition to Chase began in early 2009, when Chase ATMs became accessible for WaMu customers at no extra charge. All branches and accounts were formally merged in 2009 as the WaMu brand was retired. Branches in the Pacific Northwest, Idaho, and Utah were rebranded in May 2009; branches in Florida, Georgia, Texas, Illinois, and Greater New York were rebranded in July 2009, and the remaining branches in Nevada, California, Arizona, and Colorado were rebranded in October 2009. The last rebrandings formally retired the WaMu name.

In markets where Chase already had a dominant presence, such as Greater New York and Chicago (owing to the presence of Chase and predecessor Bank One), Chase further disposed of such branches to other banks. In New York, for instance, the acquisition resulted in Chase branches located on the same block as WaMu branches.

== Advertising campaigns ==
=== "Free Checking Account" ===
This advertising campaign was introduced between 2005 and 2007. Numerous WaMu commercials showed white, traditionally-dressed 60–70-year-old overweight bankers laughing out loud at a WaMu representative (who is much younger, fitter and black), who says the words "Free Checking Account".

=== "The Power of Yes" ===
WaMu introduced an advertising campaign during the 2003 Academy Awards known as "The Power of Yes". This was to promote the offering of loans to all consumers, particularly borrowers that the banks deemed too risky. Another commercial in the ad series showed WaMu representatives in casual clothes, contrasting with traditionally-dressed bankers in suits.

=== "Whoo hoo" ===
A promotional WaMu "Whoo hoo!" bumper sticker.

"Whoo hoo!" was an advertising campaign introduced by WaMu in February 2008. As fears of a financial crisis were rising, and WaMu was looking to become an "iconic brand that people love", they began courting consumers with a new slogan, designed to position WaMu as a consumer-friendly institution.

During its run, the Whoo hoo! ads, created by TBWA\Chiat\Day of Playa del Rey, California, become widespread in web navigation. After WaMu launched the new advertisement, there was double digit growth at its website and the term "wamu" appeared in searches over 1,000% more between January and March than in all of 2007.

WaMu (before the bank's September 2008 conservatorship and sale to JPMorgan Chase) applied to register a trademark in the phrase. Initially, the bank wanted to use "woo hoo" (without the "h" in the first word) as the slogan, but they were concerned because of the existing use of the phrase by Homer Simpson, a character in The Simpsons.

== Occasio branch design ==
WaMu introduced a unique branch design known as Occasio which eliminated traditional teller windows and queuing stanchions in favor of an open, circular floor plan with a greeter or "concierge" position and tellers working from behind podiums. The Occasio design was introduced in 2000 and patented in 2004, but was phased out following the JPMorgan Chase acquisition of WaMu's retail banking operations.

== See also ==
- Bank failure
- List of largest U.S. bank failures
- Federal Deposit Insurance Corporation
- 2008 financial crisis
- 2008–2011 bank failures in the United States
- List of banks acquired or bankrupted in the United States during the 2008 financial crisis
