= Official Committee of Equity Security Holders =

In United States bankruptcy law, the Official Committee of Equity Security Holders is a group of shareholders (usually the seven largest held positions) formed to represent a larger group of shareholders' interests in a company's bankruptcy proceedings.
