= Kerry Killinger =

American businessman and author (born 1949)

Kerry Kent Killinger (born June 6, 1949) is an American businessman and author. He is founder and CEO of Crescent Capital Associates, and previously served as chairman and chief executive officer of Washington Mutual from 1990 until 2008.

He and his wife Linda co-authored the 2021 book Nothing is Too Big to Fail: How the Last Financial Crisis Informs Today. The book received the Axiom Business Book Awards Bronze Medal, the Nautilus Award for Journalism and Investigative Reporting Silver Medal, and the IPPY award for Finance/Investments/Economics.

== Early life and career ==
Kerry Kent Killinger was born in Des Moines, Iowa on June 6, 1949. He received his education at the University of Iowa, from which he received his BBA in 1970 and MBA in 1971. He began his career in the financial services industry in 1972 as an investment analyst with Bankers Life Insurance Company of Nebraska, and moved on to Murphey Favre in 1976 where he rose from a securities analyst to executive vice president and director.

== Washington Mutual ==
Killinger joined Washington Mutual in 1983 when it acquired Murphey Favre. Killinger was named executive vice president, and promoted in 1986 to senior vice president, and to director in 1988. He was named president of the company that same year, CEO in 1990, and chairman in 1991. American Banker named him its 2001 Banker of the Year. During his tenure as CEO, Washington Mutual grew from 30 branches and $7 billion of assets to over 2,000 branches and $300 billion of assets.

In 2003, Killinger predicted that by 2008, Washington Mutual would not be identified as a bank serving wealthy customers, but a consumer bank serving everyday people, and they ultimately served over 11 million customers during the tenure of the bank. He said "We hope to do to this industry what Walmart did to theirs, Starbucks did to theirs, Costco did to theirs and Lowe’s-Home Depot did to their industries."

In 2008, Washington Mutual faced mounting losses from the mortgage market and steep declines in stock prices as a result of the subprime mortgage crisis. The board of directors removed Killinger as CEO on September 8, 2008, replacing him with Alan H. Fishman. The Office of Thrift Supervision (OTS) seized Washington Mutual's banking divisions on September 25, 2008, and named the Federal Deposit Insurance Corporation as their receiver in the largest bank failure in the history of the United States. The FDIC incurred no losses on the seizure and sale of Washington Mutual.

While CEO of Washington Mutual in 2007, Killinger earned a total compensation of $14,364,883. In 2008, he took home $25.1 million in compensation. Killinger received a $15.3 million severance payment in September 2008 "as well as a $445,200 lump-sum payment for vacation benefits and a $300,669 'special payment'".

In March 2011, Killinger and two other bank officers were sued by the FDIC for "reckless lending". Killinger counter-sued the FDIC and all cases were settled in 2012 with no findings of fault. Investigations by the Securities and Exchange Commission and Department of Justice similarly concluded there were no findings of fault or basis to bring charges against Killinger or any executive officer of Washington Mutual.

The portrayal of Killinger’s role in WaMu's downfall, told by Wall Street Journal reporter Kirsten Grind in The Lost Bank: The Story of Washington Mutual —the Biggest Bank Failure in American History was challenged by Killinger in an open letter.

== Philanthropy ==
Throughout his life, Killinger and his wife Linda supported charitable organizations and higher education institutions in Seattle, Des Moines, and Palm Desert. Killinger received the Points of Light award from President George H.W. Bush for his philanthropy.

In 2021, all proceeds of the Killingers' book Nothing is Too Big to Fail: How the Last Financial Crisis Informs Today were donated to charities engaged in criminal and social justice, government reform, civil discourse, and community building.

== Selected works ==
- Nothing is Too Big to Fail: How the Last Financial Crisis Informs Today (2021, RosettaBooks; ISBN 978-1948122764)
