= Bank United of Texas =

American financial services corporation

Bank United Corporation
- Trade name: Bank United of Texas
- Type: Public
- Traded as: NYSE: BKP
- Industry: Banking; Federal savings bank
- Founded: December 31, 1988; 37 years ago in Houston, Texas as United Savings Association FSB
- Defunct: February 14, 2001; 25 years ago
- Fate: Acquired by Washington Mutual
- Successor: Washington Mutual
- Headquarters: Houston, Texas
- Number of locations: 155 (2001)
- Area served: Texas
- Key people: Lewis Ranieri
- Website: archived official website

Bank United Corporation, headquartered in Houston, Texas, was a broad-based financial services provider and the largest publicly traded depository institution headquartered in Texas before its merger with Washington Mutual in 2001. Bank United Corp. conducted its business through its wholly owned subsidiary, Bank United, a federally chartered savings bank. The company operated a 155-branch community banking network in Texas, including 77 in the Dallas/Fort Worth Metroplex, 66 in the greater Houston area, five in Midland, four in Austin, and three in San Antonio; operated 19 SBA lending offices in 14 states; was a national middle market commercial bank with 23 regional offices in 16 states; originated mortgage loans through 11 wholesale offices in 10 states; operated a national mortgage servicing business serving approximately 324,000 customers, and managed an investment portfolio. As of June 30, 2000, Bank United Corp. had assets of $18.2 billion, deposits of $8.8 billion, and stockholder's equity of $823 million.

== History ==
At the end of 1988, Lewis Ranieri and his investor group Ranieri Wilson & Company acquired the deposits and 19 offices of the insolvent savings and loan association named United Savings Association of Texas from the Federal Savings and Loan Insurance Corporation for $200 million to create the new United Savings Association FSB.

In May 1990, United Savings acquired the deposits and 4 offices of the insolvent Ameriway Savings Association from the Resolution Trust Corporation for $981 thousand.

In June 1990, United Savings acquired the deposits and 19 offices of the insolvent Murray Savings Association of Dallas from the Resolution Trust Corporation for $809 million.

In September 1991, United Savings acquired from the Resolution Trust Corporation the deposits and 20 offices of the insolvent San Jacinto Savings Association for $34.3 million and also the deposits and 6 offices of the failed BancPlus Federal Savings Association in Pasadena for $1.7 million.

In October 1991, United Savings acquired from the Resolution Trust Corporation just the deposits from 1 office of the insolvent Victoria Savings Association of San Antonio for a $250 premium.

In September 1992, United Savings Association FSB, which was formed from six failed Texas thrifts, was renamed Bank United of Texas FSB.

In 1996, the privately owned holding company started to sell stock via an IPO while simultaneously, the original investors took this opportunity to cash in on their original investment by selling off their original shares. The Federal Deposit Insurance Corporation held warrants worth 1.5 million common shares which were redeemed at that time.

Early in 1997, Bank United petitioned the Office of the Comptroller of the Currency to change its charter from a federal savings bank to a commercial bank but later withdrew its petition.

In January 1999, Bank United announced that they had signed an agreement with Kroger to open 50 more branches inside Kroger supermarkets in the Houston and Dallas-Fort Worth metropolitan areas that were previously occupied by Bank of America and NationsBank.

In March 1999, Bank United announced the pending acquisition of the Texas Central Bancshares with its 3-branch office Texas Central Bank subsidiary for an undisclosed amount. The acquisition was completed in August 1999.

=== Washington Mutual ===
In August 2000, Washington Mutual announced the pending acquisition of the Houston-based Bank United Corporation with its 155 branch offices, all located in Texas, for $1.49 billion in stock. The acquisition was completed in February 2001.

As a result of branch overlap between Bank United and Washington Mutual, 17 branch offices were closed in Texas, 10 of which were in Houston.
